= 2014 FIBA Asia Under-18 Championship qualification =

The 2014 FIBA Asia Under-18 Championship qualification was held in late 2013 and early 2014 with the Gulf region, West Asia, Southeast Asia, East Asia, Central Asia and South Asia each conducting tournaments.

== Qualification format ==
The following are eligible to participate:

- The organizing country.
- The champion team from the previous FIBA Asia Under-18 Championship.
- The four best-placed teams from the previous FIBA Asia Under-18 Championship will qualify the same number of teams from their respective sub-zones.
- The two best teams from the sub-zones.

== 2012 FIBA Asia Under-18 Championship ==
Rank	Team	Note
1st place, gold medalist(s)	China	Direct Qualifier
2nd place, silver medalist(s)	South Korea	East Asia (+1)
3rd place, bronze medalist(s)	Iran	West Asia (+1)
4	Japan	East Asia (+2)
5	Chinese Taipei	East Asia (+3)
6	Philippines	
7	Lebanon	
8	Saudi Arabia	
9	Syria	
10	India	
11	Indonesia	
12	Bahrain	
13	Hong Kong	
14	Mongolia	
15	Kazakhstan	
16	Singapore	

== Qualified teams ==
Central Asia (1)	East Asia (2+4)	Gulf (2+1)	South Asia (1)	Southeast Asia (2)	West Asia (2+1)
Kazakhstan	China	Qatar	India	Philippines	Iraq
	Hong Kong	Bahrain		Malaysia	Iran
	Japan	Kuwait			Jordan
	South Korea				
	Chinese Taipei				
	*				

* Only 5 teams registered from East Asia.

== Central Asia ==
The 2014 CABA Under-18 Championship was held at June 12, 2014 in Taraz, Kazakhstan. The winner teams qualifies for 2014 FIBA Asia Under-18 Championship.

Team	Pld	W	L	PF	PA	PD	Pts
Kazakhstan	1	1	0	92	49	+43	2
Turkmenistan	1	0	1	49	92	−43	1

July 12
17:00

Kazakhstan	92–49	Turkmenistan

Taraz Arena, Taraz

== East Asia ==
All the others withdrew, so Chinese Taipei,Hong Kong,Japan,South Korea qualified automatically.

== Gulf ==
The 2013 GCC Youth Basketball Championship was held at Dubai, United Arab Emirates from September 3 to 7 2013. The three best teams qualifies for 2014 FIBA Asia Under-18 Championship.

Rank	Team
1st place, gold medalist(s)	Qatar
2nd place, silver medalist(s)	Bahrain
3rd place, bronze medalist(s)	Kuwait
4	Saudi Arabia
5	United Arab Emirates
6	Oman

== South Asia ==
The 2014 SABA Under-18 Championship was held at Bengaluru, India from July 5 to 7, 2014. The winner teams qualifies for 2014 FIBA Asia Under-18 Championship.

Team	Pld	W	L	PF	PA	PD	Pts
India	2	2	0	188	93	+95	4
Sri Lanka	2	1	1	189	126	+63	3
Bangladesh	2	0	2	66	224	-158	2

July 5
18:00

Bangladesh	36–126	Sri Lanka

Koramangala Indoor Stadium, Bengaluru

July 6
18:00

India	98–30	Bangladesh

Koramangala Indoor Stadium, Bengaluru

July 7
18:00

India	90–63	Sri Lanka

Koramangala Indoor Stadium, Bengaluru

== Southeast Asia ==
The 9th SEABA Under-18 Championship was held at Sabah, Malaysia from May 5 to 7 2014. The two best teams qualifies for 2014 FIBA Asia Under-18 Championship.

Rank	Team
Gold medal	Philippines
Silver medal	Malaysia
Bronze medal	Indonesia
4	Singapore

== West Asia ==
The 2013 West Asian Under-17 Championshipand The 2014 West Asian Youth Basketball Championship was held at Tehran, Iran and Amman, Jordan from August 19 to 21, 2013 and July 10 to 12, 2014 . The three best teams qualifies for 2014 FIBA Asia Under-18 Championship.

Team	Pld	W	L	PF	PA	PD	Pts
Iran	3	3	0	311	175	+136	6
Syria	3	2	1	219	211	+8	5
Iraq	3	1	2	196	256	−60	4
Jordan	3	0	3	187	271	−84	3

August 18
16:00

Syria	69–45	Jordan

Azadi Basketball Hall, Tehran

August 18
18:00

Iran	87–52	Iraq

Azadi Basketball Hall, Tehran

August 19
16:00

Jordan	83–84	Iraq

Azadi Basketball Hall, Tehran

August 19
18:00

Iran	106–64	Syria

Azadi Basketball Hall, Tehran

August 20
16:00

Syria	86–60	Iraq

Azadi Basketball Hall, Tehran

August 20
18:00

Iran	118–59	Jordan

Azadi Basketball Hall, Tehran

Team	Pld	W	L	PF	PA	PD	Pts
Iran	3	3	0	166	83	+83	4
Jordan	3	2	1	127	163	-36	3
Iraq	3	1	2	112	159	-47	2

July 10
16:00

Iran	79–36	Iraq

Emile Haddad lounge, Amman

July 11
16:00

Jordan	80–76	Iraq

Emile Haddad lounge, Amman

July 12
16:00

Iran	87–47	Jordan

Emile Haddad lounge, Amman
