= Chinese Taipei men's national under-19 basketball team =

Chinese Taipei
- FIBA zone: FIBA Asia
- National federation: Chinese Taipei Basketball Association

U19 World Cup
- Appearances: 2 (1987, 2011)
- Medals: None

U18 Asia Cup
- Appearances: 23
- Medals: Silver: 2 (1972, 1989); Bronze: 4 (1974, 1986, 2000, 2010)

The Chinese Taipei men's national under-18 and under-19 basketball team is a national basketball team of Chinese Taipei (Taiwan), administered by the Chinese Taipei Basketball Association. It represents the country in international under-18 and under-19 men's basketball competitions.

== FIBA U18 Asia Cup participations ==
Year	Result
1970	4th
1972	2nd place, silver medalist(s)
1974	3rd place, bronze medalist(s)
1977	Did not participate
1978	Did not participate
1980	Did not participate
1982	Did not participate
1984	Did not participate
1986	3rd place, bronze medalist(s)
1989	2nd place, silver medalist(s)
1990	7th
1992	5th
1995	5th
1996	5th

Year	Result
1998	4th
2000	3rd place, bronze medalist(s)
2002	6th
2004	5th
2006	4th
2008	9th
2010	3rd place, bronze medalist(s)
2012	5th
2014	4th
2016	6th
2018	9th
2022	7th
2024	12th
2026	7th

== FIBA Under-19 Basketball World Cup participations ==
Year	Result
1987	11th
2011	14th

== See also ==
- Chinese Taipei men's national basketball team
- Chinese Taipei men's national under-17 basketball team
- Chinese Taipei women's national under-19 basketball team
