= Bangladesh men's national under-19 basketball team =

Bangladesh
- FIBA zone: FIBA Asia
- National federation: Bangladesh Basketball Federation
- Coach: Md Jahid Hossain Khan

U19 World Cup
- Appearances: None

U18 Asia Cup
- Appearances: 3
- Medals: None
Home	Away

The Bangladesh men's national under-19 basketball team is a national basketball team of Bangladesh, administered by the Bangladesh Basketball Federation. It represents the country in international under-18 men's basketball competitions.

== Competitions records ==
=== FIBA Under-19 Basketball World Cup ===
FIBA Under-19 Basketball World Cup records
Hosts	Result	Position	GP	Won	Lost
(Brazil) 1979	Did not qualify				
(Spain) 1983	Did not qualify				
(Italy) 1987	Did not qualify				
(Canada) 1991	Did not qualify				
(Greece) 1995	Did not qualify				
(Portugal) 1999	Did not qualify				
(Greece) 2003	Did not qualify				
(Serbia) 2007	Did not qualify				
(New Zealand) 2009	Did not qualify				
(Latvia) 2011	Did not qualify				
(Czech Republic) 2013	Did not qualify				
(Greece) 2015	Did not qualify				
(Egypt) 2017	Did not qualify				
(Greece) 2019	Did not qualify				
(Latvia) 2021	Did not qualify				
(Hungary) 2023	Did not qualify				
(Switzerland) 2025	Did not qualify				
(Czech Republic) 2027	To be determined				
Total	0/17	0 Title	0	0	0

=== FIBA Under-18 Asia Cup ===
FIBA Under-18 Asia Cup records
Hosts	Result	Position	GP	Won	Lost
(South Korea) 1970	Did not participate				
(Philippines) 1972	Did not participate				
(Philippines) 1974	Did not participate				
(Kuwait) 1977	Did not participate				
(Philippines) 1978	Did not participate				
(Thailand) 1980	Preliminary stage	15/15	6	0	6
(Philippines) 1982	Did not participate				
(South Korea) 1984	Did not participate				
(Philippines) 1986	Did not participate				
(Philippines) 1989	Did not participate				
(Japan) 1990	Did not participate				
(China) 1992	Did not participate				
(Philippines) 1995	Did not participate				
(Malaysia) 1996	Quarter-finals	15/17	6	0	6
(India) 1998	Quarter-finals	15/15	6	0	6
(Malaysia) 2000	Did not participate				
(Kuwait) 2002	Did not participate				
(India) 2004	Did not participate				
(China) 2006	Did not participate				
(Iran) 2008	Did not participate				
(Yemen) 2010	Did not participate				
(Mongolia) 2012	Did not participate				
(Qatar) 2010	Did not participate				
(Iran) 2016	Did not participate				
(Thailand) 2018	Did not participate				
(China) 2020	Tournament did not held				
(Iran) 2022	Did not participate				
(Jordan) 2024	Did not participate				
Total	3/26	0 Title	18	0	18

== See also ==
- Bangladesh men's national basketball team
