= Saudi Arabia men's national under-18 basketball team =

Saudi Arabia
- FIBA zone: FIBA Asia
- National federation: Saudi Arabian Basketball Federation

U19 World Cup
- Appearances: None

U18 Asia Cup
- Appearances: 12
- Medals: None

The Saudi Arabia men's national under-18 basketball team is a national basketball team of Saudi Arabia, administered by the Saudi Arabian Basketball Federation. It represents the country in international under-18 men's basketball competitions.

== FIBA Under-18 Asia Cup participations ==
Year	Result
1977	11th
1978	5th
1980	4th
1982	9th
1989	6th
1990	5th
2000	5th
2002	7th
2004	10th
2008	11th
2010	15th
2012	8th

== See also ==
- Saudi Arabia men's national basketball team
- Saudi Arabia men's national under-16 basketball team
- Saudi Arabia men's national 3x3 team
