= Malaysia men's national under-19 basketball team =

Malaysia
- FIBA ranking: 74 ▼5 (December 2024)
- Joined FIBA: 1957
- FIBA zone: FIBA Asia
- National federation: Malaysia Basketball Association

U19 World Cup
- Appearances: 1 (2003)
- Medals: None

U18 Asia Cup
- Appearances: 20
- Medals: None

The Malaysia men's national under-18 and under-19 basketball team is a national basketball team of Malaysia, administered by the Malaysia Basketball Association. It represents the country in men's international under-18 and under-19 basketball competitions.

== FIBA Under-18 Asia Cup participations ==
Year	Result
1970	6th
1972	7th
1974	5th
1977	5th
1978	8th
1980	9th
1982	6th
1984	5th
1989	11th
1990	6th

Year	Result
1992	11th
1995	11th
1996	8th
1998	8th
2000	11th
2002	10th
2006	14th
2008	15th
2010	12th
2014	7th

== FIBA Under-19 Basketball World Cup participations ==
Year	Result
2003	15th

== See also ==
- Malaysia men's national basketball team
- Malaysia men's national under-16 basketball team
- Malaysia women's national under-18 basketball team
