= Qatar men's national under-19 basketball team =

Qatar
- FIBA zone: FIBA Asia
- National federation: Qatar Basketball Federation
- Coach: Brian Lester

U19 World Cup
- Appearances: 1 (1999)
- Medals: None

U18 Asia Cup
- Appearances: 13
- Medals: Silver: 2 (1996, 1998)
Home	Away

The Qatar men's national under-18 and under-19 basketball team is a national basketball team of Qatar, administered by the Qatar Basketball Federation (Arabic: الاتحاد القطري لكرة السلة). It represents the country in international under-18 and under-19 men's basketball competitions.

== FIBA U18 Asia Cup participations ==
Year	Result
1980	16th
1982	15th
1992	7th
1996	2nd place, silver medalist(s)
1998	2nd place, silver medalist(s)
2000	7th
2002	4th
2004	16th
2010	16th
2014	9th
2022	8th
2024	9th
2026	11th

== FIBA Under-19 Basketball World Cup participations ==
Year	Result
1999	10th

== See also ==
- Qatar men's national basketball team
- Qatar women's national basketball team
- Qatar men's national under-16 basketball team
- Qatar men's national 3x3 team
