= Japan men's national under-19 basketball team =

Japanese youth national basketball team

Japan
- FIBA zone: FIBA Asia
- National federation: Japan Basketball Association
- Coach: Kenichi Sako

U19 World Cup
- Appearances: 5
- Medals: None

U18 Asia Cup
- Appearances: 26
- Medals: Gold: 1 (1990); Silver: 3 (1970, 2016, 2022); Bronze: 2 (1996, 1998)
Home	Away

The Japan men's national under-18 and under-19 basketball team is a national basketball team of Japan, administered by the Japan Basketball Association. It represents the country in international under-18 and under-19 men's basketball competitions.

At the 2017 FIBA Under-19 World Cup, Japan finished 10th, ahead of every competitor from FIBA Oceania, FIBA Asia and FIBA Africa.

Prominent members had been Rui Hachimura and also Kai Toews and Isaiah Murphy. Murphy played with his Japanese name Shinsaku Enomoto.

== FIBA U18 Asia Cup participations ==
Year	Result
1970	2nd place, silver medalist(s)
1972	Did not participate
1974	Did not participate
1977	6th
1978	4th
1980	5th
1982	5th
1984	4th
1986	5th
1989	4th
1990	1st place, gold medalist(s)
1992	4th
1995	7th
1996	3rd place, bronze medalist(s)

Year	Result
1998	3rd place, bronze medalist(s)
2000	4th
2002	5th
2004	9th
2006	6th
2008	4th
2010	8th
2012	4th
2014	6th
2016	2nd place, silver medalist(s)
2018	5th
2022	2nd place, silver medalist(s)
2024	7th
2026	5th

== FIBA Under-19 Basketball World Cup record ==
Year	Pos.	Pld	W	L
(Brazil) 1979	Did not qualify			
(Spain) 1983	Did not qualify			
(Italy) 1987	Did not qualify			
(Canada) 1991	16th	8	0	8
(Greece) 1995	Did not qualify			
(Portugal) 1999	14th	8	2	6
(Greece) 2003	Did not qualify			
(Serbia) 2007	Did not qualify			
(New Zealand) 2009	Did not qualify			
(Latvia) 2011	Did not qualify			
(Czech Republic) 2013	Did not qualify			
(Greece) 2015	Did not qualify			
(Egypt) 2017	10th	7	3	4
(Greece) 2019	Did not qualify			
(Latvia) 2021	16th	7	0	7
(Hungary) 2023	8th	7	2	5
(Switzerland) 2025	Did not qualify			
(Czech Republic) 2027	Did not qualify			
(Indonesia) 2029	To be determined			
Total	5/19	37	7	30

== See also ==
- Japan men's national basketball team
- Japan men's national under-17 basketball team
- Japan women's national under-19 basketball team
