= Thailand men's national under-18 basketball team =

Thailand
- FIBA zone: FIBA Asia
- National federation: Basketball Sport Association of Thailand

U19 World Cup
- Appearances: None

U18 Asia Cup
- Appearances: 15
- Medals: Bronze: 1 (1980)

The Thailand men's national under-16 basketball team is a national basketball team of Thailand, administered by the Basketball Sport Association of Thailand. It represents the country in international under-18 men's basketball competitions.

== FIBA U18 Asia Cup participations ==
Year	Result
1972	5th
1974	4th
1977	4th
1978	11th
1980	3rd place, bronze medalist(s)
1982	4th
1989	9th
1992	10th

Year	Result
1995	4th
1996	7th
2000	14th
2006	11th
2016	11th
2018	14th
2026	15th

== See also ==
- Thailand men's national basketball team
- Thailand men's national under-16 basketball team
- Thailand women's national under-19 basketball team
