= Kuwait men's national under-18 basketball team =

Kuwait
- FIBA zone: FIBA Asia
- National federation: Kuwait Basketball Association

U19 World Cup
- Appearances: None

U18 Asia Cup
- Appearances: 11
- Medals: (bronze) Bronze: 1 (1977)

The Kuwait men's national under-18 basketball team is a national basketball team of Kuwait, administered by the Kuwait Basketball Association. It represents the country in international under-18 men's basketball competitions.

== FIBA Under-18 Asia Cup participations ==
Year	Result
1977	3rd place, bronze medalist(s)
1978	7th
1980	6th
1982	16th
1998	12th
2000	8th
2002	8th
2004	12th
2006	8th
2014	12th
2024	15th

== See also ==
- Kuwait men's national basketball team
- Kuwait men's national under-16 basketball team
- Kuwait women's national under-18 basketball team
