= India men's national under-18 basketball team =

India
- Joined FIBA: 1936
- FIBA zone: FIBA Asia
- National federation: Basketball Federation of India
- Coach: Scott Flemming
- Nickname: The Young Cagers

U19 World Cup
- Appearances: None

U18 Asia Cup
- Appearances: 23
- Medals: None
Home	Away

The India men's national under-18 basketball team is a national basketball team of India, administered by the Basketball Federation of India. It represents the country in international under-18 men's basketball competitions.

The team's best performance to date was 4th place at the 1972 Asian Basketball Under-18 Championship.

== Competitive history ==
=== FIBA Under-19 Basketball World Cup ===
- (Brazil) 1979 to (Switzerland) 2025 : Did not qualify

=== FIBA U18 Asia Cup ===
Year	Result
1970	5th
1972	4th
1977	15th
1980	12th
1982	10th
1989	12th
1990	11th
1995	9th
1996	13th
1998	11th
2000	12th
2002	13th

Year	Result
2004	7th
2006	13th
2008	13th
2010	13th
2012	10th
2014	13th
2016	8th
2018	11th
2022	9th
2024	8th
2026	12th

== See also ==
- India men's national basketball team
- India men's national under-16 basketball team
- India women's national under-18 basketball team
