= Hong Kong men's national under-18 basketball team =

Hong Kong
- FIBA zone: FIBA Asia
- National federation: Basketball Association of Hong Kong, China

U19 World Cup
- Appearances: None

U18 Asia Cup
- Appearances: 19
- Medals: None

The Hong Kong men's national under-18 basketball team is a national basketball team of Hong Kong, administered by the Basketball Association of Hong Kong, China. It represents the region in international under-18 men's basketball competitions.

== FIBA Under-18 Asia Cup participations ==
Year	Result
1974	7th
1977	12th
1978	10th
1980	13th
1982	11th
1986	6th
1989	16th
1990	8th
1992	8th
1995	13th

Year	Result
1996	11th
1998	10th
2000	6th
2002	12th
2004	6th
2006	16th
2008	12th
2012	13th
2014	11th

== See also ==
- Hong Kong men's national basketball team
- Hong Kong men's national under-16 basketball team
- Hong Kong women's national under-18 basketball team
