= 2026 FIBA U18 Asia Cup =

28th FIBA Under-18 Asian Basketball Championship

Tournament details
- Host country: India
- City: Ahmedabad
- Dates: 13−23 August
- Teams: 16 (from 2 confederations)
- Venue: 1 (in 1 host city)

Final positions
- Champions: Australia (3rd title)
- Runners-up: China
- Third place: New Zealand

Tournament statistics
- MVP: (Australia) Ahmet Yahya Başaran
- Top scorer: (Qatar) Mousa (32.8 ppg)
- Top rebounds: (Bahrain) Onoduenyi (16.5 rpg)
- Top assists: (Qatar) Yakan (8.5 apg)
- PPG (Team): Australia (101.5 ppg)
- RPG (Team): Australia (64.5 rpg)
- APG (Team): China (27 apg)

Official website
- Ahmedabad 2026

The 2026 FIBA U18 Asia Cup was an international under-18 men's basketball tournament that was held in Ahmedabad, India, from 13 to 23 August 2026. This was the 28th edition of the biennial FIBA U18 Asia Cup, previously known as the FIBA U18 Asian Championship. The tournament also served as the FIBA Asia's qualifier for the 2027 FIBA Under-19 Basketball World Cup in Czechia, where the top four teams qualified.

Australia secured their second straight title, and third championship overall, with a victory over China in the final, 89–79. The finalists, together with both losing semifinalists — New Zealand, who won the bronze medal against South Korea in their 3rd place match, 102–97 — punched their tickets to the 2027 FIBA Under-19 Basketball World Cup as FIBA Asia's representatives.

== Venue ==
Ahmedabad	India
Veer Savarkar Indoor Stadium	2026 FIBA U18 Asia Cup (India)

== Qualification ==
=== Allocation of berths and auto qualifiers ===
According to FIBA Asia rules, the number of participating teams in the FIBA U18 Asian Championship is set at 16. The hosts and the defending champions qualified automatically. The host does not take its subzone's berth and the defending champions do. All FIBA Asia subzones got two berths each, except for the Central and South Asian subzones, which got one berth each. FIBA Oceania got two berths. The last three berths were allocated to Asian subzones based on their teams' results in the 2024 FIBA U18 Asia Cup.

Allocation of berths
Subzone	Default berths	Additional berth as host	Additional berths as top 3 Asian teams from last championship	Total
Central Asia	1	0	0	1
East Asia	2	0	2	4
Gulf	2	0	0	2
South Asia	1	1	0	2
Southeast Asia	2	0	0	2
West Asia	2	0	1	3
FIBA Oceania	2	0	0	2 (Note: Unlike the host, the defending champion does not provide an additional berth. For example, the defending champion is from Oceania and is auto-qualified. Only 1 berth (2 subtracted by 1) is provided to the other countries from Oceania, not 2.)
Total	12	1	3	16

Automatic qualifiers
Subzone	Host	Defending champion
Central Asia	0	0
East Asia	0	0
Gulf	0	0
South Asia	1	0
Southeast Asia	0	0
West Asia	0	0
FIBA Oceania	0	1
Total	1	1

=== Qualified teams ===
Means of qualification	Date	Venue	Berths	Qualified team/s
Host nation	13 May 2026	(Lebanon) Beirut	1	India
Defending champions	2−9 September 2024	(Jordan) Amman	1	Australia
2026 U18 CABA Qualifier	7−9 April 2026	(Uzbekistan) Tashkent	1	Kazakhstan
2026 U18 EABA Qualifier	2−7 June 2026	(Japan) Fukuoka	4	China; South Korea; Japan; Chinese Taipei
2026 U18 GBA Qualifier	25−30 July 2026	(Qatar) Doha	2	Bahrain; Qatar
2026 U18 SABA Qualifier	25–29 May 2026	(Sri Lanka) Colombo	1	Sri Lanka
2026 U18 SEABA Qualifier	10–14 June 2026	(Thailand) Krabi	2	Philippines; Thailand
2026 U18 WABA Qualifier	7−11 July 2026	(Jordan) Amman	3	Iran; Lebanon; Syria
2025 FIBA U17 Oceania Cup	8–13 December 2025	Samoa	1	New Zealand
Total			16	

== Preliminary round ==
All times are local (UTC+5:30). The groups were determined after the qualifiers.

=== Group A ===
Pos	Team	Pld	W	L	PF	PA	PD	Pts	Qualification
1	Australia	3	3	0	319	159	+160	6	Quarterfinals
2	Philippines	3	2	1	249	257	−8	5	Playoffs
3	Chinese Taipei	3	1	2	256	261	−5	4	Playoffs
4	Thailand	3	0	3	156	303	−147	3	

Source: FIBA
Rules for classification: 1) Points; 2) Head-to-head results; 3) Points difference; 4) Points scored.

13 August 2026
10:30

Report

Australia	102–32	Thailand
Scoring by quarter: 21−5, 25−14, 34−8, 22−5
Pts: Fa'ale 22; Rebs: Başaran 14; Asts: Browne 6		Pts: David 10; Rebs: Apirach, Ravazzini 6 Asts: Wachirawich 3

Veer Savarkar Indoor Stadium, Ahmedabad
Referees: Aryan Jamshidi (IRN), An Young San (KOR), Nicolas Haber (LBN)

13 August 2026
13:30

Report

Chinese Taipei	88–89	Philippines
Scoring by quarter: 12−31, 17−22, 30−21, 29−15
Pts: Coleman 22; Rebs: Huang 9 Asts: Jhou 7		Pts: Cagurungan 21; Rebs: Aguas 10; Asts: Tubongbanua 4

Veer Savarkar Indoor Stadium, Ahmedabad
Referees: Wissam Zein (SYR), Rakesh Ramalingaiah (IND), Tomohiro Hosoda (JPN)

15 August 2026
10:30

Report

Philippines	69–107	Australia
Scoring by quarter: 19−24, 15−32, 21−25, 14−26
Pts: Green 12; Rebs: Aguas, Gish 4 Asts: Bautista, Atacador 3		Pts: Başaran 17; Rebs: Evic 9 Asts: Hanson 8

Veer Savarkar Indoor Stadium, Ahmedabad
Referees: Wissam Zein (SYR), Sun Yimiao (CHN), Yousif Zainel (QAT)

15 August 2026
13:30

Report

Thailand	62–110	Chinese Taipei
Scoring by quarter: 18−28, 9−31, 13−24, 22−27
Pts: Allsopp 15; Rebs: Thanawat 7 Asts: 4 players 2		Pts: Liu 21; Rebs: 3 players 7 Asts: Chuang 11

Veer Savarkar Indoor Stadium, Ahmedabad
Referees: Rakesh Ramalingaiah (IND), Aryan Jamshidi (IRN), Thivanka Perera (SRI)

17 August 2026
10:30

Report

Australia	110–58	Chinese Taipei
Scoring by quarter: 25−15, 34−10, 20−17, 31−16
Pts: Fa'ale 21; Rebs: Başaran 14; Asts: Hanson, Browne 8		Pts: Coleman 18; Rebs: Coleman, Chen 5 Asts: Chuang 5

Veer Savarkar Indoor Stadium, Ahmedabad
Referees: Wissam Zein (SYR), David Raju Dharnalakota (IND), Yousif Zainel (QAT)

17 August 2026
13:30

Report

Philippines	91–62	Thailand
Scoring by quarter: 17−25, 23−19, 31−6, 20−12
Pts: Atacador 16; Rebs: Aguas 9 Asts: Green 3		Pts: Phurich 14; Rebs: Ravazzini 7 Asts: Wachirawich 6

Veer Savarkar Indoor Stadium, Ahmedabad
Referees: Michael Graham (NZL), Rakesh Ramalingaiah (IND), Sun Yimiao (CHN)

=== Group B ===
Pos	Team	Pld	W	L	PF	PA	PD	Pts	Qualification
1	New Zealand	3	3	0	266	162	+104	6	Quarterfinals
2	Bahrain	3	2	1	208	222	−14	5	Playoffs
3	Syria	3	1	2	198	223	−25	4	Playoffs
4	Lebanon	3	0	3	194	259	−65	3	

Source: FIBA
Rules for classification: 1) Points; 2) Head-to-head results; 3) Points difference; 4) Points scored.

13 August 2026
16:30

Report

New Zealand	67–58	Syria
Scoring by quarter: 15−13, 23−21, 22−11, 7−13
Pts: Ball 19; Rebs: Chunga 9 Asts: Ball 4		Pts: Aldassouki 15; Rebs: Kassas 8 Asts: Al Azawi 3

Veer Savarkar Indoor Stadium, Ahmedabad
Referees: Yuen Chun Yip (HKG), Sun Yimiao (CHN), Joenard Garcia (PHI)

13 August 2026
19:30

Report

Lebanon	68–74	Bahrain
Scoring by quarter: 11−22, 14−15, 18−21, 25−16
Pts: Sawma 27; Rebs: El Herera 13; Asts: El Herera 11		Pts: Baqer, Abdulkadir 19; Rebs: Onoduenyi 18; Asts: Baqer 8

Veer Savarkar Indoor Stadium, Ahmedabad
Referees: Mohammad Taha (JOR), Nattapong Jontapa (THA), Alexander James McEwan (AUS)

15 August 2026
16:30

Report

Bahrain	42–86	New Zealand
Scoring by quarter: 9−25, 6−18, 13−23, 14−20
Pts: Onoduenyi 16; Rebs: Onoduenyi 17; Asts: 4 players 1		Pts: Hopoi 16; Rebs: Kelso, Chunga 9 Asts: Ball, Savill 4

Veer Savarkar Indoor Stadium, Ahmedabad
Referees: Nattapong Jontapa (THA), Joenard Garcia (PHI), Anton Kozlov (KAZ)

15 August 2026
19:30

Report

Syria	72–64	Lebanon
Scoring by quarter: 16−12, 20−14, 12−19, 24−19
Pts: Takriti 15; Rebs: Awutiak 12; Asts: Kassas, Kabani 4		Pts: El Herera 26; Rebs: Rizk 16; Asts: El Herera 7

Veer Savarkar Indoor Stadium, Ahmedabad
Referees: Yuen Chun Yip (HKG), Mohammad Taha (JOR), An Young San (KOR)

17 August 2026
16:30

Report

New Zealand	113–62	Lebanon
Scoring by quarter: 25−10, 33−21, 24−18, 31−13
Pts: Ball 19; Rebs: Wickham 7 Asts: Kelso, Robertson 7		Pts: Sawma 21; Rebs: Rizk 7 Asts: Rizk 4

Veer Savarkar Indoor Stadium, Ahmedabad
Referees: Aryan Jamshidi (IRN), An Young Sun (KOR), Joenard Garcia (PHI)

17 August 2026
19:30

Report

Bahrain	92–68	Syria
Scoring by quarter: 29−18, 11−24, 29−17, 23−12
Pts: Onoduenyi 26; Rebs: Abdulkadir 12; Asts: Mohamed 5		Pts: Awutiak 14; Rebs: Awutiak 8 Asts: Kassas 5

Veer Savarkar Indoor Stadium, Ahmedabad
Referees: Mohammed Taha (JOR), Yuen Chun Yip (HKG), Alexander James McEwan (AUS)

=== Group C ===
Pos	Team	Pld	W	L	PF	PA	PD	Pts	Qualification
1	China	3	3	0	317	179	+138	6	Quarterfinals
2	Iran	3	2	1	262	207	+55	5	Playoffs
3	Qatar	3	1	2	225	255	−30	4	Playoffs
4	Sri Lanka	3	0	3	140	303	−163	3	

Source: FIBA
Rules for classification: 1) Points; 2) Head-to-head results; 3) Points difference; 4) Points scored.

14 August 2026
10:30

Report

China	103–55	Sri Lanka
Scoring by quarter: 27−10, 29−20, 23−10, 24−15
Pts: Yang 23; Rebs: Chen 8 Asts: Wang 11		Pts: Thomas 13; Rebs: Mudiyanselage 8 Asts: Thomas 3

Veer Savarkar Indoor Stadium, Ahmedabad
Referees: Tomohiro Hosoda (JPN), Joenard Garcia (PHI), David Raju Dharnalakota (IND)

14 August 2026
13:30

Report

Iran	94–69	Qatar
Scoring by quarter: 19−9, 30−17, 21−26, 24−17
Pts: Shamsi 19; Rebs: Shamsi 9 Asts: Shamsi 8		Pts: Mousa 26; Rebs: Bedri 10; Asts: Yakan 9

Veer Savarkar Indoor Stadium, Ahmedabad
Referees: Wissam Zein (SYR), Michael Graham (NZL), Nattapong Jontapa (THA)

16 August 2026
10:30

Report

Qatar	66–118	China
Scoring by quarter: 11−32, 20−32, 14−30, 21−24
Pts: Mousa 22; Rebs: Hausawi 5 Asts: Yakan 5		Pts: Hao 18; Rebs: Zhao 10; Asts: Chen 9

Veer Savarkar Indoor Stadium, Ahmedabad
Referees: Mohammad Taha (JOR), Alexander James McEwan (AUS), Nicolas Haber (LBN)

16 August 2026
13:30

Report

Sri Lanka	42–110	Iran
Scoring by quarter: 8−28, 12−25, 4−26, 18−31
Pts: Liyanage 12; Rebs: Liyanage 10; Asts: Mudiyanselage 4		Pts: Kamal 23; Rebs: Azari 11; Asts: Shamsi 15

Veer Savarkar Indoor Stadium, Ahmedabad
Referees: Nattapong Jontapa (THA), Tomohiro Hosoda (JPN), Hou Chun-Jen (TPE)

18 August 2026
10:30

Report

China	96–58	Iran
Scoring by quarter: 29−17, 18−12, 27−17, 22−12
Pts: Li 17; Rebs: Zhao 10; Asts: Wang 9		Pts: Soleyman 9 Rebs: Azari 14; Asts: Shamsi 4

Veer Savarkar Indoor Stadium, Ahmedabad
Referees: Mohammad Taha (JOR), Rakesh Ramalingaiah (IND), Tomohiro Hosoda (JPN)

18 August 2026
13:30

Report

Qatar	90–43	Sri Lanka
Scoring by quarter: 20−17, 18−9, 29−10, 23−7
Pts: Mousa 37; Rebs: Abuissa 11; Asts: Yakan 9		Pts: Liyanage 10; Rebs: Mudiyanselage 12; Asts: Thomas 4

Veer Savarkar Indoor Stadium, Ahmedabad
Referees: Alexander James McEwan (AUS), Hou Chun-Jen (TPE), An Young San (KOR)

=== Group D ===
Pos	Team	Pld	W	L	PF	PA	PD	Pts	Qualification
1	South Korea	3	3	0	252	193	+59	6	Quarterfinals
2	Japan	3	2	1	236	168	+68	5	Playoffs
3	India (H)	3	1	2	199	242	−43	4	Playoffs
4	Kazakhstan	3	0	3	174	258	−84	3	

Updated to match(es) played on 18 August 2026. Source: FIBA
Rules for classification: 1) Points; 2) Head-to-head results; 3) Points difference; 4) Points scored.
(H) Hosts

14 August 2026
16:30

Report

South Korea	95–68	Kazakhstan
Scoring by quarter: 15−11, 24−13, 33−24, 23−20
Pts: Yoon J.H. 21; Rebs: Yoon J.W. 10; Asts: Yoon J.H. 12		Pts: Mamutov 17; Rebs: Sultanov 10; Asts: Sultanov 12

Veer Savarkar Indoor Stadium, Ahmedabad
Referees: Mohammad Taha (JOR), Aryan Jamshidi (IRN), Ye Zhen (CHN)

14 August 2026
19:30

Report

Japan	91–56	India
Scoring by quarter: 19−13, 23−15, 26−14, 23−14
Pts: Benedict 20; Rebs: Tsuneoka 15; Asts: Fujiwara 8		Pts: Rathee 16; Rebs: Rathee, Choudhary 9 Asts: Rathee 6

Veer Savarkar Indoor Stadium, Ahmedabad
Referees: Yuen Chun Yip (HKG), Nicolas Haber (LBN), Hou Chun-Jen (TPE)

16 August 2026
16:30

Report

Kazakhstan	45–81	Japan
Scoring by quarter: 11−21, 10−23, 19−12, 5−25
Pts: Sultanov 15; Rebs: Mamutov 10; Asts: Sultanov, Mamutov 3		Pts: McMillian 16; Rebs: McMillian 12; Asts: Nakamura 5

Veer Savarkar Indoor Stadium, Ahmedabad
Referees: Yuen Chun Yip (HKG), Ye Zhen (CHN), Thivanka Perera (SRI)

16 August 2026
19:30

Report

India	61–90	South Korea
Scoring by quarter: 14−29, 17−25, 15−22, 15−14
Pts: Arman 25; Rebs: Tomer 9 Asts: Rathee 7		Pts: Eom J.H. 17; Rebs: Yoon J.H., Eom S.M. 6 Asts: Yoon J.H. 9

Veer Savarkar Indoor Stadium, Ahmedabad
Referees: Wissam Zein (SYR), Sun Yimiao (CHN), Michael Graham (NZL)

18 August 2026
16:30

Report

South Korea	67–64	Japan
Scoring by quarter: 20−17, 8−20, 21−11, 18−16
Pts: Yoon J.H. 27; Rebs: Yoon J.W., Eom S.M. 8 Asts: Yoon J.H. 3		Pts: Takahashi 19; Rebs: McMillian 15; Asts: Thompson 8

Veer Savarkar Indoor Stadium, Ahmedabad
Referees: Yuen Chun Yip (HKG), Wissam Zein (SYR), Nicolas Haber (LBN)

18 August 2026
19:30

Report

India	82–61	Kazakhstan
Scoring by quarter: 22−21, 23−15, 20−11, 17−14
Pts: Choudhary 25; Rebs: Tomer 13; Asts: Rathee 11		Pts: Mamutov 24; Rebs: Mamutov 7 Asts: Mamutov 4

Veer Savarkar Indoor Stadium, Ahmedabad
Referees: Nattapong Jontapa (THA), Ye Zhen (CHN), Michael Graham (NZL)

== Brackets ==
=== Main bracket ===
Playoffs
20 August
Iran	83
India	66
20 August
Bahrain	99
Chinese Taipei	109
20 August
Japan	80
Qatar	75
20 August
Philippines	72
Syria	63

Quarterfinals
21 August
Australia	90
Iran	69
21 August
South Korea	107
Chinese Taipei	79
21 August
New Zealand	94
Japan	58
21 August
China	117
Philippines	103

Semifinals
22 August
Australia	111
South Korea	74
22 August
New Zealand	66
China	79

Final
23 August
Australia	89
China	79
Third place game
23 August
South Korea	97
New Zealand	102

=== 5th place bracket ===
5th–8th place semifinals
22 August
Iran	105
Chinese Taipei	84
22 August
Japan	80
Philippines	75

Fifth place game
23 August
Iran	83
Japan	88
Seventh place game
23 August
Chinese Taipei	89
Philippines	78

== Final round ==
=== Playoffs ===
20 August 2026
10:30

Report

Philippines	72–63	Syria
Scoring by quarter: 13−15, 19−16, 19−13, 21−19
Pts: Green 16; Rebs: Pasinos 7 Asts: Aguas 4		Pts: Awutiak 20; Rebs: Awutiak 13; Asts: Kassas 6

Veer Savarkar Indoor Stadium, Ahmedabad
Referees: Yuen Chun Yip (HKG), Michael Graham (NZL), Rakesh Ramalingaiah (IND)

20 August 2026
13:30

Report

Bahrain	99–109	Chinese Taipei
Scoring by quarter: 24−23, 28−30, 27−22, 20−34
Pts: Abdulkadir 36; Rebs: Abdulkadir 18; Asts: Baqer 8		Pts: Liu 33; Rebs: Xing 8 Asts: Liu 6

Veer Savarkar Indoor Stadium, Ahmedabad
Referees: Nattapong Jontapa (THA), Alexander James McEwan (AUS), Aryan Jamshidi (IRN)

20 August 2026
16:30

Report

Japan	80–75	Qatar
Scoring by quarter: 20−13, 18−22, 17−20, 25−20
Pts: Tsuneoka 19; Rebs: Tsuneoka 8 Asts: Nakamura 6		Pts: Mousa 46; Rebs: Bedri 8 Asts: Yakan 11

Veer Savarkar Indoor Stadium, Ahmedabad
Referees: Mohammad Taha (JOR), Sun Yimiao (CHN), Joenard Garcia (PHI)

20 August 2026
19:30

Report

Iran	83–66	India
Scoring by quarter: 21−16, 26−17, 23−13, 13−20
Pts: Kamal 23; Rebs: Azari 9 Asts: Behnia, Nezhad 6		Pts: Choudhary 19; Rebs: Rathee, Mishra 8 Asts: Rathee 6

Veer Savarkar Indoor Stadium, Ahmedabad
Referees: Wissam Zein (SYR), An Young Sun (KOR), Tomohiro Hosoda (JPN)

=== Quarterfinals ===
21 August 2026
10:30

Report

China	117–103	Philippines
Scoring by quarter: 33−20, 26−25, 28−23, 30−35
Pts: Wang 25; Rebs: Zhao 9 Asts: Chen 6		Pts: Moral 26; Rebs: Pasinos, Green 5 Asts: Aguas, Pasinos 3

Veer Savarkar Indoor Stadium, Ahmedabad
Referees: Mohammad Taha (JOR), Aryan Jamshidi (IRN), Alexander James McEwan (AUS)

21 August 2026
13:30

Report

South Korea	107–79	Chinese Taipei
Scoring by quarter: 24−18, 27−16, 23−26, 33−19
Pts: Eom J.H. 31; Rebs: 3 players 7 Asts: Park 5		Pts: Coleman 22; Rebs: Coleman 11; Asts: Liu, Jhou 6

Veer Savarkar Indoor Stadium, Ahmedabad
Referees: Wissam Zein (SYR). Rakesh Ramalingaiah (IND), Tomohiro Hosoda (JPN)

21 August 2026
16:30

Report

New Zealand	94–58	Japan
Scoring by quarter: 28−21, 22−6, 18−7, 26−24
Pts: Ball 20; Rebs: Chunga, Wickham 10; Asts: Savill, Hopoi 5		Pts: Nakamura 17; Rebs: McMillian 9 Asts: Nakamura 6

Veer Savarkar Indoor Stadium, Ahmedabad
Referees: Yuen Chun Yip (HKG), Nicolas Haber (LBN), Hou Chun-Jen (TPE)

21 August 2026
19:30

Report

Australia	90–69	Iran
Scoring by quarter: 33−15, 17−11, 26−20, 14−23
Pts: Başaran 21; Rebs: Hanson 10; Asts: Browne 7		Pts: Nezhad 20; Rebs: Esmaeili 7 Asts: Shamsi 5

Veer Savarkar Indoor Stadium, Ahmedabad
Referees: Nattapong Jontapa (THA), Joenard Garcia (PHI), Ye Zhen (CHN)

=== 5th–8th place semifinals ===
22 August 2026
10:30

Report

Japan	80–75	Philippines
Scoring by quarter: 25−16, 14−18, 15−15, 26−26
Pts: Benedict 20; Rebs: Tsuneoka 9 Asts: K. Nakamura 6		Pts: Moral 21; Rebs: Aguas 7 Asts: Pasinos 3

Veer Savarkar Indoor Stadium, Ahmedabad
Referees: An Young Sun (KOR), Sun Yimiao (CHN), Michael Graham (NZL)

22 August 2026
13:30

Report

Iran	105–84	Chinese Taipei
Scoring by quarter: 34−21, 23−11, 24−27, 24−25
Pts: Gigasari 26; Rebs: Shamsi 13; Asts: Shamsi 12		Pts: Xing 20; Rebs: Coleman 11; Asts: Liu 6

Veer Savarkar Indoor Stadium, Ahmedabad
Referees: Alexander James McEwan (AUS), Nicolas Haber (LBN), Thivanka Perera (SRI)

=== Semifinals ===
22 August 2026
16:30

Report

New Zealand	66–79	China
Scoring by quarter: 10−24, 19−18, 19−21, 18−16
Pts: Ball 23; Rebs: Chunga 7 Asts: Ball 5		Pts: Zhang C.Z. 18; Rebs: Zhang Y.Z.J. 10; Asts: Wang 9

Veer Savarkar Indoor Stadium, Ahmedabad
Referees: Mohammad Taha (JOR), Nattapong Jontapa (THA), Rakesh Ramalingaiah (IND)

22 August 2026
19:30

Report

Australia	111–74	South Korea
Scoring by quarter: 21−15, 25−18, 34−22, 31−19
Pts: Fa'ale 20; Rebs: Başaran 15; Asts: Hanson 13		Pts: Yoon J.W. 18; Rebs: Yoon J.W. 6 Asts: Eom J.H. 7

Veer Savarkar Indoor Stadium, Ahmedabad
Referees: Yuen Chun Yip (HKG), Wissam Zein (SYR), Aryan Jamshidi (IRN)

=== Seventh place game ===
23 August 2026
10:30

Report

Chinese Taipei	89–78	Philippines
Scoring by quarter: 20−22, 29−19, 23−19, 17−18
Pts: Coleman 23; Rebs: Coleman 15; Asts: Huang 8		Pts: Moral 22; Rebs: Moral 9 Asts: Green 3

Veer Savarkar Indoor Stadium, Ahmedabad
Referees: Rakesh Ramalingaiah (IND), Alexander James McEwan (AUS), An Young Sun (KOR)

=== Fifth place game ===
23 August 2026
13:30

Report

Iran	83–88	Japan
Scoring by quarter: 18−17, 18−16, 20−27, 27−28
Pts: Kamal 26; Rebs: Nezhad 7 Asts: Shamsi 7		Pts: K. Nakamura 30; Rebs: Tsuneoka 10; Asts: 3 players 3

Veer Savarkar Indoor Stadium, Ahmedabad
Referees: Joenard Garcia (PHI), Ye Zhen (CHN), Hou Chun-Jen (TPE)

=== Third place game ===
23 August 2026
16:30

Report

South Korea	97–102	New Zealand
Scoring by quarter: 23−26, 26−23, 23−21, 25−32
Pts: Yoon J.W. Rebs: Yoon J.W. 6 Asts: Yoon J.H. 10		Pts: Ball 29; Rebs: Wickham 11; Asts: Ball 7

Veer Savarkar Indoor Stadium, Ahmedabad
Referees: Yuen Chun Yip (HKG), Sun Yimiao (CHN), Nicolas Haber (LBN)

=== Final ===
23 August 2026
19:30

Report

Australia	89–79	China
Scoring by quarter: 26−18, 18−24, 25−22, 20−15
Pts: Fa'ale 19; Rebs: Riddle 10; Asts: Hanson 5		Pts: Zhang Y.Z.J. 20; Rebs: Li 12; Asts: Zhang Y.C. 7

Veer Savarkar Indoor Stadium, Ahmedabad
Referees: Mohammad Taha (JOR), Aryan Jamshidi (IRN), Tomohiro Hosoda (JPN)

== Final standings ==
Rank	Team	Record
1st place, gold medalist(s)	Australia	6–0
2nd place, silver medalist(s)	China	5–1
3rd place, bronze medalist(s)	New Zealand	5–1
4	South Korea	4–2
5	Japan	5–2
6	Iran	4–3
7	Chinese Taipei	3–4
8	Philippines	3–4
9	Bahrain	2–2
10	Syria	1–3
11	Qatar	1–3
12	India	1–3
13	Lebanon	0–3
14	Kazakhstan	0–3
15	Thailand	0–3
16	Sri Lanka	0–3

Qualified for the 2027 FIBA Under-19 Basketball World Cup

== Awards ==
2026 U18 Asia Cup champions

Australia
Third title

Most Valuable Player
(Australia) Ahmet Yahya Başaran

=== All-Tournament Team ===
- F (China) Zhang Yizhaojie
- F (New Zealand) Jackson Ball
- C (Australia) Ahmet Yahya Başaran (MVP)
- G (South Korea) Yoon Ji-hoon
- G (Australia) Jai Fa'ale
