= 1978 ABC Under-18 Championship =

Tournament details
- Host country: Philippines
- Dates: 1−14 October
- Teams: 13 (from 2 confederations)
- Venue: 2 (in 2 host cities)

Final positions
- Champions: Philippines (5th title)
- Runners-up: China
- Third place: Iraq

The 1978 ABC Under-18 Championship was the fifth edition of the Asian Basketball Confederation (ABC)'s junior championship. The tournament was hosted by the Philippines from October 1 to 14, 1978 in Rizal Memorial Coliseum in Manila and Araneta Coliseum in Quezon City (both cities in Metro Manila), and was held at the sidelines of the 1978 FIBA World Championship. The competition also served as the qualifier for the maiden FIBA Under-19 World Championship, where FIBA Asia has been allocated of two slots.

The Philippines successfully defended their title by sweeping all of their assignments, en route to their fifth straight title, capped by 83-62 victory over China on the final day of competition.

== Venues ==
Metro Manila		Philippines	
Manila	Quezon City	1978 ABC Under-18 Championship is located in Philippines	Metro Manila
Rizal Memorial Coliseum; Capacity: 8,000	Araneta Coliseum; Capacity: 25,000*	1978 ABC Under-18 Championship is located in Philippines	1978 ABC Under-18 Championship is located in Metro Manila

== Preliminary round ==
All times are local (UTC+8:00). The draw for the groups were held on 30 September 1978.

=== Group A ===
Pos	Team	Pld	W	L	PF	PA	PD	Pts	Qualification
1	Philippines (H)	3	3	0	335	183	+152	6	Championship round
2	Japan	3	2	1	251	238	+13	5	Championship round
3	Iran	3	1	2	191	253	−62	4	Classification 7th-13th
4	Singapore	3	0	3	172	275	−103	3	Classification 7th-13th

Source: Groupings
Rules for classification: 1) Points; 2) Head-to-head results; 3) Points difference; 4) Points scored.
(H) Hosts

1 October 1978

Report

Philippines	123–61	Singapore
Scoring by half: 60−37, 63−24
Pts: Saldaña 17		Pts: Tan S.L. 18

Araneta Coliseum, Quezon City

2 October 1978

Report

Japan	93–75	Iran
Scoring by half: −, −

3 October 1978

Report

Iran	66–62	Singapore
Scoring by half: 34−37, 32−29
Pts: Shahi 34		Pts: Tan S.L. 16

NBI Gymnasium, Manila

4 October 1978

Report

Iran	50–98	Philippines
Scoring by half: −, −

5 October 1978

Report

Philippines	114–72	Japan
Scoring by half: −, −

UST Gymnasium, Manila

6 October 1978

Report

Japan	86–49	Singapore
Scoring by half: 38−22, 48−27
Pts: Matsuoka 18		Pts: Tan S.L. 14

UST Gymnasium, Manila

=== Group B ===
Pos	Team	Pld	W	L	PF	PA	PD	Pts	Qualification
1	China	3	3	0	258	175	+83	6	Championship round
2	Indonesia	3	2	1	245	229	+16	5	Championship round
3	Malaysia	3	1	2	213	254	−41	4	Classification 7th-13th
4	Bahrain	3	0	3	179	237	−58	3	Classification 7th-13th

Source: Groupings
Rules for classification: 1) Points; 2) Head-to-head results; 3) Points difference; 4) Points scored.

1 October 1978

Report

China	85–73	Indonesia
Scoring by half: 45−32, 40−41

2 October 1978

Report

Malaysia	80–66	Bahrain
Scoring by half: −, −

3 October 1978

Report

Bahrain	54–88	China
Scoring by half: −, −

Loyola Gymnasium, Quezon City

4 October 1978

Report

Indonesia	103–85	Malaysia
Scoring by half: −, −

5 October 1978

Report

Malaysia	48–85	China
Scoring by half: −, −

Adamson University Gymnasium, Manila

6 October 1978

Report

Bahrain	59–69	Indonesia
Scoring by half: −, −

=== Group C ===
Pos	Team	Pld	W	L	PF	PA	PD	Pts	Qualification
1	Iraq	4	4	0	321	270	+51	8	Championship round
2	Saudi Arabia	4	2	2	268	279	−11	6	Championship round
3	Kuwait	4	2	2	270	270	0	6	Classification 7th-13th
4	Hong Kong	4	2	2	269	282	−13	6	Classification 7th-13th
5	Thailand	4	0	4	281	308	−27	4	Classification 7th-13th

Source: Groupings
Rules for classification: 1) Points; 2) Head-to-head results; 3) Points difference; 4) Points scored.

2 October 1978

Report

Thailand	75–81	Iraq
Scoring by half: −, −

2 October 1978

Report

Saudi Arabia	75–61	Hong Kong
Scoring by half: −, −

3 October 1978

Report

Kuwait	56–62	Hong Kong
Scoring by half: −, −

3 October 1978

Report

Thailand	59–61	Saudi Arabia
Scoring by half: −, −

4 October 1978

Report

Iraq	61–59	Kuwait
Scoring by half: −, −

4 October 1978

Report

Hong Kong	78–64	Thailand
Scoring by half: −, −

5 October 1978

Report

Iraq	87–68	Hong Kong
Scoring by half: −, −

Loyola Gymnasium, Quezon City

5 October 1978

Report

Kuwait	67–64	Saudi Arabia
Scoring by half: −, −

NBI Gymnasium, Manila

6 October 1978

Report

Thailand	83–88	Kuwait
Scoring by half: −, −

6 October 1978

Report

Saudi Arabia	68–92	Iraq
Scoring by half: −, −

== Final round ==
=== Classification 7th–13th ===
Pos	Team	Pld	W	L	PF	PA	PD	Pts
1	Kuwait	6	5	1	382	339	+43	11 (Note: Head-to-head result: Kuwait 74–70 Malaysia.)
2	Malaysia	6	5	1	444	413	+31	11
3	Bahrain	6	4	2	424	448	−24	10
4	Hong Kong	6	3	3	389	397	−8	9
5	Thailand	6	2	4	492	504	−12	8
6	Iran	6	1	5	202	209	−7	7 (Note: Head-to-head result: Iran 66–62 Singapore.)
7	Singapore	6	1	5	504	527	−23	7

Source: Groupings
Rules for classification: 1) Points; 2) Head-to-head results; 3) Points difference; 4) Points scored.
Notes:

7 October 1978

Report

Thailand	100–90	Singapore
Scoring by half: −, −

7 October 1978

Report

Hong Kong	88–90	Malaysia
Scoring by half: 39−51, 49−39

7 October 1978

Report

Kuwait	83–57	Bahrain
Scoring by half: −, −

8 October 1978

Report

Malaysia	70–74	Kuwait
Scoring by half: −, −

8 October 1978

Report

Singapore	110–86	Hong Kong
Scoring by half: −, −

8 October 1978

Report

Iran	76–85	Thailand
Scoring by half: −, −

9 October 1978

Report

Hong Kong	W–L	Iran
Scoring by half: −, −

9 October 1978

Report

Kuwait	81–67	Singapore
Scoring by half: 37−38, 44−29

Rizal Memorial Coliseum, Manila

10 October 1978

Report

Singapore	72–76	Bahrain
Scoring by half: 29−29, 43−47

UST Gymnasium, Manila

10 October 1978

Report

Iran	L–W	Kuwait
Scoring by half: −, −

11 October 1978

Report

Bahrain	62–60	Iran
Scoring by half: −, −

11 October 1978

Report

Malaysia	118–103	Singapore
Scoring by half: 64−45, 54−58

Rizal Memorial Coliseum, Manila

12 October 1978

Report

Thailand	82–86	Malaysia
Scoring by half: −, −

12 October 1978

Report

Hong Kong	75–77	Bahrain
Scoring by half: −, −

13 October 1978

Report

Iran	L–W	Malaysia
Scoring by half: −, −

13 October 1978

Report

Thailand	78–86	Bahrain
Scoring by half: −, −

=== Championship round ===
Pos	Team	Pld	W	L	PF	PA	PD	Pts
1	Philippines (H)	5	5	0	551	348	+203	10
2	China	5	4	1	431	379	+52	9
3	Iraq	5	3	2	459	470	−11	8
4	Japan	5	2	3	422	471	−49	7
5	Saudi Arabia	5	1	4	298	395	−97	6
6	Indonesia	5	0	5	418	516	−98	5

Source: Groupings
Rules for classification: 1) Points; 2) Head-to-head results; 3) Points difference; 4) Points scored.
(H) Hosts

7 October 1978

Report

Philippines	87–52	Saudi Arabia
Scoring by half: −, −

8 October 1978

Report

Japan	83–88	Iraq
Scoring by half: −, −

Araneta Coliseum, Quezon City

9 October 1978

Report

Indonesia	81–148	Philippines
Scoring by half: −, −

9 October 1978

Report

China	99–79	Japan
Scoring by half: −, −

10 October 1978

Report

Iraq	108–93	Indonesia
Scoring by half: −, −

10 October 1978

Report

Saudi Arabia	54–78	China
Scoring by half: −, −

11 October 1978

Report

China	107–90	Iraq
Scoring by half: −, −

11 October 1978

Report

Indonesia	62–63	Saudi Arabia
Scoring by half: −, −

12 October 1978

Report

Saudi Arabia	61–76	Japan
Scoring by half: −, −

12 October 1978

Report

Iraq	81–119	Philippines
Scoring by half: −, −

13 October 1978

Report

Japan	108–93	Indonesia
Scoring by half: −, −

Rizal Memorial Coliseum, Manila

14 October 1978

Report

Philippines	83–62	China
Scoring by half: 46−40, 37−22

Araneta Coliseum, Quezon City

== Final standings ==
Rank	Team	Record
1st place, gold medalist(s)	Philippines	6–0
2nd place, silver medalist(s)	China	5–1
3rd place, bronze medalist(s)	Iraq	5–2
4	Japan	3–3
5	Saudi Arabia	2–5
6	Indonesia	2–4
7	Kuwait	5–2
8	Malaysia	4–2
9	Bahrain	4–2
10	Hong Kong	3–4
11	Thailand	2–5
12	Iran	1–5
13	Singapore	1–5

Qualified for the 1979 FIBA Under-19 World Championship

== Awards ==
1978 ABC Under-18 champions

Philippines
5th title
