= 2014 FIBA Asia Under-18 Championship =

23rd FIBA Under-18 Asian Basketball Championship

Tournament details
- Host country: Qatar
- City: Doha
- Dates: August 19–28
- Teams: 14 (from 1 confederation)
- Venue: 1 (in 1 host city)

Final positions
- Champions: China (11th title)
- Runners-up: Iran
- Third place: South Korea

Tournament statistics
- Top scorer: (Qatar) Saad (27.0)
- Top rebounds: (Jordan) Abuaboud (11.7)
- Top assists: (Japan) Tsuyama (5.1)
- PPG (Team): China (90.8)
- RPG (Team): Jordan (61.9)
- APG (Team): South Korea (26.3)

Official website
- www.fiba.basketball/history

The 2014 FIBA Asia Under-18 Championship was the 23rd edition of the FIBA Asia's under-18 men's basketball championship. The games were played in Doha, Qatar, from 19 to 28 August 2014. The tournament also served as a qualification for the 2015 FIBA Under-19 World Championship, where the top three teams qualified.

China won the tournament after defeating Iran in the final, 66–48, to secure their 11th FIBA Asia Under-18 Championship title.

== Qualification ==
=== Allocation of berths ===
According to FIBA Asia rules, the number of participating teams in the FIBA Asia Under-18 Championship was set at 16. The hosts and the defending champions qualified automatically. All FIBA Asia subzones got two berths each, except for the Central and South Asian subzones, which got one berth each. The last four berths were allocated to subzones based on their teams' results in the 2012 FIBA Asia Under-18 Championship.

Allocation of berths
Subzone	Automatic qualifiers		Default berths	Additional berths as 2nd–5th place teams from last championship	Total
Subzone	Hosts	Defending champions	Default berths	Additional berths as 2nd–5th place teams from last championship	Total
Central Asia	0	0	1	0	1
East Asia	0	1	2	3	6
Gulf	1	0	2	0	3
South Asia	0	0	1	0	1
Southeast Asia	0	0	2	0	2
West Asia	0	0	2	1	3
Total	1	1	10	4	16

=== Qualified teams ===
Central Asia (1)	East Asia (2+4)	Gulf (2+1)	South Asia (1)	Southeast Asia (2)	West Asia (2+1)
Kazakhstan	China	Qatar	India	Philippines	Iraq
	Hong Kong	Bahrain		Malaysia	Iran
	Japan	Kuwait			Jordan
	South Korea				
	Chinese Taipei				
	*				

* Only 5 teams registered from East Asia.

== Draw ==
The draw and schedule of games for the preliminary round competition has been announced. Al-Gharafa Stadium was named as the main venue for the duration of the tournament, with six out of eight games will be played there. The FIBA Boys' World Rankings as of 31 December 2013 are shown in parentheses.

Group A	Group B	Group C	Group D
China (13); India (48); Malaysia (51); Qatar (86)	South Korea (16); Philippines (34); Jordan (55) -	Iran (23); Kazakhstan (33); ~~Bahrain~~* (57); Kuwait (65)	Japan (28); Chinese Taipei (31); Iraq (76); Hong Kong (60)

* withdrew

== Preliminary round ==
Qualified for the second round

=== Group A ===
Team	Pld	W	L	PF	PA	PD	Pts	Tie
China	3	3	0	284	113	+171	6	
Qatar	3	1	2	174	240	−66	4	1–1; 1.03
Malaysia	3	1	2	197	238	−41	4	1–1; 0.99
India	3	1	2	186	250	−64	4	1–1; 0.97

August 19
09:00

Boxscore

China	95–55	Malaysia
Scoring by quarter: 25–17, 29–7, 23–15, 18–16
Pts: Zhao 28; Rebs: Zou 8 Asts: Zhao, Zou 6		Pts: Wee 14; Rebs: three players 4 Asts: Foo 3

Al-Gharafa Stadium, Doha
Referees: Reynaldo Yante (PHI), Salem Alhaza'a (KUW), Hamlet Arakelyan (KAZ)

August 19
17:00

Boxscore

India	73–86	Qatar
Scoring by quarter: 19–18, 6–30, 25–18, 23–20
Pts: Singh 20; Rebs: Bhullar, Gill 9 Asts: Singh 5		Pts: Saad 40; Rebs: Abdelhaleem, Al Shawaqfeh 10; Asts: Saad 8

Al-Gharafa Stadium, Doha
Referees: Yuen Chun Yip (HKG), Glenn Cornelio (PHI), Xia Chun (CHN)

August 20
11:00

Boxscore

Malaysia	64–73	India
Scoring by quarter: 23–18, 12–20, 16–20, 13–15
Pts: Y. Wong 17; Rebs: Chang 9 Asts: Foo 3		Pts: Gill 24; Rebs: Gill 17; Asts: Narender . 11

Al-Gharafa Stadium, Doha
Referees: Hamlet Arakelyan (KAZ), Salem Alhaza'a (KUW), Chuang Chih-Chun (TPE)

August 20
17:00

Boxscore

Qatar	18–89	China
Scoring by quarter: 6–20, 2–22, 6–25, 4–22
Pts: Abdelhaleem 6 Rebs: Al Shawaqfeh, Saad 5 Asts: four players 1		Pts: Zuo 20; Rebs: Zuo 12; Asts: Shi 5

Al-Gharafa Stadium, Doha
Referees: Nobuyasu Aibara (JPN), Hadi Salem (IRI), Yuen Chun Yip (HKG)

August 21
11:00

Boxscore

China	100–40	India
Scoring by quarter: 31–13, 27–6, 26–11, 16–10
Pts: Zhou 21; Rebs: Zou 9 Asts: Zhao 11		Pts: Narender ., Gill 13; Rebs: Ohlan 5 Asts: Narender . 4

Al-Gharafa Stadium, Doha
Referees: Sadegh Ghanbaridamanab (IRI), Nobuyasu Aibara (JPN), Glenn Cornelio (PHI)

August 21
17:00

Boxscore

Malaysia	78–70	Qatar
Scoring by quarter: 16–20, 14–10, 23–20, 25–20
Pts: Wee 28; Rebs: Ting 9 Asts: Foo 5		Pts: Saad 28; Rebs: Abdelhaleem 12; Asts: Abdelhaleem, Saad 2

Al-Gharafa Stadium, Doha
Referees: Chuang Chih-Chun (TPE), Salem Alhaza'a (KUW), Hadi Salem (IRI)

=== Group B ===
Team	Pld	W	L	PF	PA	PD	Pts
South Korea	2	2	0	182	107	+75	4
Philippines	2	1	1	154	147	+7	3
Jordan	2	0	2	98	180	−82	2

August 19
11:00

Boxscore

South Korea	95–38	Jordan
Scoring by quarter: 18–8, 11–10, 32–8, 34–12
Pts: Byeon 15; Rebs: Song 11; Asts: Kwon 8		Pts: Abuaboud, Bousheh 8 Rebs: Alabed Allat 13; Asts: three players 2

Al-Gharafa Stadium, Doha
Referees: Yan Jun (CHN), Bakr Abdulla Al-Kuwari (QAT), Chuang Chih-Chun (TPE)

August 20
09:00

Boxscore

Jordan	60–85	Philippines
Scoring by quarter: 13–14, 13–30, 13–28, 21–13
Pts: Alabed Allat 21; Rebs: Abuaboud 22; Asts: Abuaboud 5		Pts: Tongco 24; Rebs: Black, Paras 9 Asts: Caracut 6

Al-Gharafa Stadium, Doha
Referees: Walid Marcel Abirached (LIB), Khalid Mohammed Al-Hebabi (QAT), Sadegh Ghanbaridamanab (IRI)

August 21
09:00

Boxscore

Philippines	69–87	South Korea
Scoring by quarter: 17–23, 22–22, 15–16, 15–26
Pts: Tongco 24; Rebs: Dyke 13; Asts: Mosqueda, Yu 3		Pts: K. Kim 17; Rebs: K. Kim 15; Asts: Jang, Kwon 6

Al-Gharafa Stadium, Doha
Referees: Walid Marcel Abirached (LIB), Hamlet Arakelyan (KAZ), Yuen Chun Yip (HKG)

=== Group C ===
Team	Pld	W	L	PF	PA	PD	Pts
Iran	2	2	0	213	99	+114	4
Kazakhstan	2	1	1	141	156	−15	3
Kuwait	2	0	2	118	217	−99	2

August 19
15:00

Boxscore

Kazakhstan	85–75	Kuwait
Scoring by quarter: 18–16, 18–18, 21–18, 28–23
Pts: Kachayev 24; Rebs: Agabek 14; Asts: Kachayev 4		Pts: Hasan 34; Rebs: Matwali 12; Asts: Hasan 6

Al-Gharafa Stadium, Doha
Referees: Nobuyasu Aibara (JPN), Sadegh Ghanbaridamanab (IRI), Hwang Intae (KOR)

August 20
15:00

Boxscore

Kuwait	43–132	Iran
Scoring by quarter: 10–33, 9–32, 10–28, 14–39
Pts: Almutairi 12; Rebs: Hasan 6 Asts: Yousef 2		Pts: Ghamari 22; Rebs: Allahverdi 8 Asts: Mehr 8

Al-Gharafa Stadium, Doha
Referees: Xia Chun (CHN), Rajnarayan Patro (IND), Reynaldo Yante (PHI)

August 21
19:00

Boxscore

Iran	81–56	Kazakhstan
Scoring by quarter: 29–20, 22–8, 16–15, 14–13
Pts: Yousof Vand 22; Rebs: Yousof Vand 11; Asts: Soroodi 5		Pts: Danilchenko 11; Rebs: Aitkali 11; Asts: Kachayev, Litvinenko 3

Al-Gharafa Stadium, Doha
Referees: Mohammed Ismail Altarawneh (JOR), Chang Yee Chuan (MAS), Yan Jun (CHN)

=== Group D ===
Team	Pld	W	L	PF	PA	PD	Pts
Chinese Taipei	3	3	0	312	219	+93	6
Japan	3	2	1	253	216	+37	5
Hong Kong	3	1	2	248	288	−40	4
Iraq	3	0	3	209	297	−88	3

August 19
11:00

Boxscore

Chinese Taipei	106–83	Hong Kong
Scoring by quarter: 33–24, 21–13, 27–24, 25–22
Pts: Y. Sun 26; Rebs: Y. Sun 12; Asts: Lin 5		Pts: Ho 21; Rebs: Tsoi 7 Asts: On 4

Al-Rayyan Stadium, Doha
Referees: Rajnarayan Patro (IND), Khalid Mohammed Al-Hebabi (QAT), Hadi Salem (IRI)

August 19
13:00

Boxscore

Japan	81–62	Iraq
Scoring by quarter: 19–18, 22–8, 15–20, 25–16
Pts: Mikami 14; Rebs: Watanabe 10; Asts: Yamanashi 8		Pts: Alsaadi 25; Rebs: Abdulhae 8 Asts: Al-Fahham 4

Al-Gharafa Stadium, Doha
Referees: Walid Marcel Abirached (LIB), Mohammed Ismail Altarawneh (JOR), Chang Yee Chuan (MAS)

August 20
13:00

Boxscore

Hong Kong	71–96	Japan
Scoring by quarter: 14–26, 16–24, 22–25, 19–21
Pts: Yip 22; Rebs: Ho, Tsoi 9 Asts: On 3		Pts: Aoki 19; Rebs: Aoki 14; Asts: Ide 6

Al-Gharafa Stadium, Doha
Referees: Hwang Intae (KOR), Bakr Abdulla Al-Kuwari (QAT), Chang Yee Chuan (MAS)

August 20
19:00

Boxscore

Iraq	61–122	Chinese Taipei
Scoring by quarter: 12–29, 17–34, 12–24, 20–35
Pts: Alsaadi 14; Rebs: Almahmud, Alsaadi 7 Asts: Al-Zubaidi 3		Pts: Y. Sun 22; Rebs: Ke 15; Asts: Chen 8

Al-Gharafa Stadium, Doha
Referees: Glenn Cornelio (PHI), Mohammed Ismail Altarawneh (JOR), Yan Jun (CHN)

August 21
11:00

Boxscore

Iraq	86–94	Hong Kong
Scoring by quarter: 31–24, 23–14, 14–25, 18–31
Pts: Alsaadi 29; Rebs: Al-Zuhairi 14; Asts: Al-Fahham 8		Pts: On 31; Rebs: Ho 5 Asts: Lo 8

Al-Rayyan Stadium, Doha
Referees: Rajnarayan Patro (IND), Bakr Abdulla Al-Kuwari (QAT), Xia Chun (CHN)

August 21
13:00

Boxscore

Japan	75–84	Chinese Taipei
Scoring by quarter: 25–22, 11–16, 19–29, 20–17
Pts: Mikami 20; Rebs: Watanabe 12; Asts: Tsuyama 7		Pts: Po-Yu Tseng 20; Rebs: Pin-Fu Tseng 10; Asts: Lin 7

Al-Gharafa Stadium, Doha
Referees: Hwang Intae (KOR), Khalid Mohammed Al-Hebabi (QAT), Reynaldo Yante (PHI)

== Second round ==
Advanced to the final round
Advanced to the 9th–12th place classification playoffs

=== Group E ===
Team	Pld	W	L	PF	PA	PD	Pts
China	5	5	0	453	231	+222	10
South Korea	5	4	1	445	298	+147	9
Philippines	5	3	2	357	386	−29	8
Malaysia	5	2	3	327	401	−74	7
Qatar	5	1	4	282	399	−117	6
Jordan	5	0	5	258	407	−149	5

August 22
15:00

Boxscore

China	97–55	Jordan
Scoring by quarter: 28–9, 25–15, 27–16, 17–15
Pts: Sun 17; Rebs: Zou 10; Asts: Wang 7		Pts: E'layan 13; Rebs: Abuaboud 6 Asts: five players 2

Al-Gharafa, Doha
Referees: Salem Alhaza'a (KUW), Hamlet Arakelyan (KAZ), Sadegh Ghanbaridamanab (IRI)

August 22
17:00

Boxscore

Qatar	79–82	Philippines
Scoring by quarter: 22–19, 17–21, 25–13, 15–29
Pts: Saad 35; Rebs: Abdelhaleem 13; Asts: Alyousif 5		Pts: Yu 16; Rebs: Escoto 10; Asts: Go, Yu 5

Al-Gharafa, Doha
Referees: Walid Marcel Abirached (LIB), Rajnarayan Patro (IND), Yuen Chun Yip (HKG)

August 22
19:00

Boxscore

Malaysia	61–107	South Korea
Scoring by quarter: 15–30, 24–21, 13–28, 9–28
Pts: Heng, Wong 14; Rebs: John Wong 7 Asts: Foo 4		Pts: Jeon 22; Rebs: K. Kim, Lee 6 Asts: Y. Kim 7

Al-Gharafa, Doha
Referees: Hadi Salem (IRI), Nobuyasu Aibara (JPN), Chuang Chih-Chun (TPE)

August 23
15:00

Boxscore

Jordan	57–64	Malaysia
Scoring by quarter: 9–8, 11–14, 22–19, 15–23
Pts: Hijazi 15; Rebs: Abuaboud 14; Asts: Hassooneh 5		Pts: Tan 21; Rebs: Ting 9 Asts: Ting 4

Al-Gharafa, Doha
Referees: Nobuyasu Aibara (JPN), Sadegh Ghanbaridamanab (IRI), Yuen Chun Yip (HKG)

August 23
17:00

Boxscore

South Korea	102–49	Qatar
Scoring by quarter: 28–7, 18–11, 22–19, 34–12
Pts: Jeon 27; Rebs: Kwon 6 Asts: Kim 12		Pts: Saad 15; Rebs: Saad 6 Asts: Saad 4

Al-Gharafa, Doha
Referees: Walid Marcel Abirached (LIB), Chuang Chih-Chun (TPE), Hadi Salem (IRI)

August 23
19:00

Boxscore

Philippines	49–91	China
Scoring by quarter: 15–22, 10–22, 10–20, 14–27
Pts: Bienes 9 Rebs: Santillan 5 Asts: Santillan 3		Pts: Zhao 25; Rebs: Shao 10; Asts: Sun 6

Al-Gharafa, Doha
Referees: Rajnarayan Patro (IND), Salem Alhaza'a (KUW), Hamlet Arakelyan (KAZ)

August 24
15:00

Boxscore

China	81–54	South Korea
Scoring by quarter: 11–6, 19–24, 29–5, 22–19
Pts: Zou 18; Rebs: Zou 11; Asts: Zhao 5		Pts: Byeon 13; Rebs: Lee 8 Asts: Jang 6

Al-Gharafa, Doha
Referees: Walid Marcel Abirached (LIB), Nobuyasu Aibara (JPN), Salem Alhaza'a (KUW)

August 24
17:00

Boxscore

Qatar	66–48	Jordan
Scoring by quarter: 19–16, 18–14, 15–9, 14–9
Pts: Saad 28; Rebs: Abdelhaleem 19; Asts: Al Shawaqfeh 6		Pts: Hamati 12; Rebs: Alsawalhi 13; Asts: Hamati 3

Al-Gharafa, Doha
Referees: Rajnarayan Patro (IND), Hamlet Arakelyan (KAZ), Sadegh Ghanbaridamanab (IRI)

August 24
19:00

Boxscore

Malaysia	69–72	Philippines
Scoring by quarter: 19–12, 14–17, 18–22, 18–21
Pts: Wong 15; Rebs: Wong 9 Asts: Foo 4		Pts: Tongco 22; Rebs: Dyke 10; Asts: Go 6

Al-Gharafa, Doha
Referees: Yuen Chun Yip (HKG), Chuang Chih-Chun (TPE), Hadi Salem (IRI)

=== Group F ===
Team	Pld	W	L	PF	PA	PD	Pts
Iran	5	5	0	466	247	+219	10
Chinese Taipei	5	4	1	398	357	+41	9
Japan	5	3	2	403	362	+41	8
Kazakhstan	5	2	3	365	361	+4	7
Hong Kong	5	1	4	325	463	−138	6
Kuwait	5	0	5	308	475	−167	5

August 22
9:00

Boxscore

Kuwait	65–94	Chinese Taipei
Scoring by quarter: 14–20, 24–28, 7–29, 20–17
Pts: Hasan 19; Rebs: Hasan 12; Asts: Hasan5		Pts: Lin 17; Rebs: S. Sun 9 Asts: Chen 6

Al-Gharafa, Doha
Referees: Glenn Cornelio (PHI), Hwang Intae (KOR), Xia Chun (CHN)

August 22
11:00

Boxscore

Kazakhstan	80–81	Japan
Scoring by quarter: 15–23, 22–20, 28–19, 15–19
Pts: Danilchenko 23; Rebs: Danilchenko 11; Asts: Danilchenko, Kadyr 4		Pts: Tsuyama 27; Rebs: Aoki 12; Asts: Ide 9

Al-Gharafa, Doha
Referees: Yan Jun (CHN), Khalid Mohammed Al-Hebabi (QAT), Mohammed Ismail Altarawneh (JOR)

August 22
13:00

Boxscore

Iran	107–42	Hong Kong
Scoring by quarter: 22–10, 31–11, 33–14, 21–7
Pts: Yousof Vand 18; Rebs: Nasiririneh, Rezaei 8 Asts: Allahverdi 6		Pts: three players 8 Rebs: Ho 5 Asts: On, Yip 2

Al-Gharafa, Doha
Referees: Reynaldo Yante (PHI), Bakr Abdulla Al-Kuwari (QAT), Chang Yee Chuan (MAS)

August 23
9:00

Boxscore

Hong Kong	78–70	Kuwait
Scoring by quarter: 15–15, 14–25, 32–14, 17–16
Pts: Chu 20; Rebs: Yip 17; Asts: Chu 7		Pts: Hasan 23; Rebs: Hasan 12; Asts: Maitwali 7

Al-Gharafa, Doha
Referees: Mohammed Ismail Altarawneh (JOR), Chang Yee Chuan (MAS), Reynaldo Yante (PHI)

August 23
11:00

Boxscore

Chinese Taipei	73–60	Kazakhstan
Scoring by quarter: 25–9, 24–17, 11–17, 13–17
Pts: Tseng 19; Rebs: Hsu 10; Asts: Lin 8		Pts: Kirilin 13; Rebs: Danilchenko 10; Asts: Kadyr 5

Al-Gharafa, Doha
Referees: Hwang Intae (KOR), Bakr Abdulla Al-Kuwari (QAT), Yan Jun (CHN)

August 23
13:00

Boxscore

Japan	65–72	Iran
Scoring by quarter: 9–21, 23–16, 16–19, 17–16
Pts: Mikami 17; Rebs: Uchida 7 Asts: Ide 4		Pts: Yousofvand 23; Rebs: Yousofvand 13; Asts: Rezayifar 5

Al-Gharafa, Doha
Referees: Xia Chun (CHN), Khalid Mohammed Al-Hebabi (QAT), Glenn Cornelio (PHI)

August 24
9:00

Boxscore

Kazakhstan	84–51	Hong Kong
Scoring by quarter: 13–11, 24–12, 18–10, 29–18
Pts: Aitkali, Kirilin 21; Rebs: Aitkali 14; Asts: Kadyr 9		Pts: Chu 15; Rebs: Tsoi, Yip 7 Asts: On 4

Al-Gharafa, Doha
Referees: Hwang Intae (KOR), Mohammed Ismail Altarawneh (JOR), Xia Chun (CHN)

August 24
11:00

Boxscore

Kuwait	55–86	Japan
Scoring by quarter: 17–15, 13–27, 17–17, 8–27
Pts: Alyahyouh 16; Rebs: Hasan 11; Asts: Hussain 2		Pts: Motomura 19; Rebs: Tomita 8 Asts: Tsuyama, Yamanashi 6

Al-Gharafa, Doha
Referees: Yan Jun (CHN), Bakr Abdulla Al-Kuwari (QAT), Reynaldo Yante (PHI)

August 24
13:00

Boxscore

Iran	74–41	Chinese Taipei
Scoring by quarter: 18–10, 21–10, 22–8, 13–13
Pts: Allahverdi, Soroodi 14; Rebs: Yousof Vand 14; Asts: Mehr 7		Pts: Po-Yu Tseng 16; Rebs: Lin 5 Asts: Lin 3

Al-Gharafa, Doha
Referees: Glenn Cornelio (PHI), Khalid Mohammed Al-Hebabi (QAT), Chang Yee Chuan (MAS)

== Classification 13th–14th ==
August 23
11:00

India	vs.	Iraq
Cancelled

Al-Gharafa, Doha

The match was cancelled. According to the FIBA tournament website, Iraq was awarded 13th place overall.

== Classification 9th–12th ==
9th–12th place semifinals
August 26
Qatar	84
Kuwait	75
August 26
Hong Kong	64
Jordan	97

9th place
August 27
Qatar	52
Jordan	51
11th place
August 27
Kuwait	79
Hong Kong	113

=== 9th–12th place semifinals ===
August 26
9:00

Boxscore

Qatar	84–75	Kuwait
Scoring by quarter: 24–9, 27–12, 25–19, 8–35
Pts: Saad 36; Rebs: Abed 17; Asts: Alyousif 7		Pts: Faraj 31; Rebs: Hasan 13; Asts: Akbar

Al-Gharafa, Doha
Referees: Rajnarayan Patro (IND), Hadi Salem (IRI), Yan Jun (CHN)

August 26
11:00

Boxscore

Hong Kong	64–97	Jordan
Scoring by quarter: 16–26, 4–18, 20–29, 24–24
Pts: On 22; Rebs: On 8 Asts: On 5		Pts: Abuaboud 16; Rebs: Abuaboud 20; Asts: Abuaboud, Alsawalhi 4

Al-Gharafa, Doha
Referees: Glenn Cornelio (PHI), Hamlet Arakelyan (KAZ), Sadegh Ghanbaridamanab (IRI)

=== 11th place ===
August 27
9:00

Boxscore

Kuwait	79–113	Hong Kong
Scoring by quarter: 17–32, 16–25, 18–27, 28–29
Pts: Hasan 29; Rebs: Hasan 11; Asts: Hasan 5		Pts: Ho 32; Rebs: Tsoi 10; Asts: On 10

Al-Gharafa, Doha
Referees: Reynaldo Yante (PHI), Hamlet Arakelyan (KAZ), Chang Yee Chuan (MAS)

=== 9th place ===
August 27
11:00

Boxscore

Qatar	52–51	Jordan
Scoring by quarter: 11–7, 12–16, 15–15, 14–13
Pts: Saad 31; Rebs: Abdelhaleem 17; Asts: Alyousif 6		Pts: Alabed Allat 16; Rebs: Alsawalhi 16; Asts: Alsawalhi 4

Al-Gharafa, Doha
Referees: Xia Chun (CHN), Chuang Chih-Chun (TPE), Hadi Salem (IRI)

== Final round ==
Fifth place
E3	Philippines (OT)	113
F3	Japan	105
Seventh place
F4	Kazakhstan	74
E4	Malaysia	86

5th–8th place semifinals
F4	Kazakhstan	74
E3	Philippines	86
E4	Malaysia	63
F3	Japan	87

Quarterfinals
E1	China	106
F4	Kazakhstan	53
F2	Chinese Taipei	90
E3	Philippines	86
F1	Iran	92
E4	Malaysia	36
E2	South Korea	90
F3	Japan	61

Semifinals
E1	China	92
F2	Chinese Taipei	50
F1	Iran	78
E2	South Korea	60

Final
E1	China	66
F1	Iran	48
Third place
F2	Chinese Taipei	58
E2	South Korea	70

=== Quarterfinals ===
August 26
13:00

Boxscore

South Korea	90–61	Japan
Scoring by quarter: 16–20, 20–14, 28–7, 26–20
Pts: Kim K.W. 18; Rebs: Kim K.W. 15; Asts: Jang T.B. 7		Pts: Mikami 12; Rebs: Tsuruta 8 Asts: Tsuyama 5

Al-Gharafa, Doha
Referees: Yuen Chun Yip (HKG), Chuang Chih-Chun (TPE), Reynaldo Yante (PHI)

August 26
15:00

Boxscore

China	106–53	Kazakhstan
Scoring by quarter: 23–18, 32–10, 30–13, 21–12
Pts: Shao Y.L. 19; Rebs: Shao Y.L. 8 Asts: Yang 6		Pts: Danilchenko 12; Rebs: Danilchenko 9 Asts: Kadyr 5

Al-Gharafa, Doha
Referees: Mohammed Ismail Altarawneh (JOR), Salem Alhaza'a (KUW), Khalid Mohammed Al-Hebabi (QAT)

August 26
17:00

Boxscore

Chinese Taipei	90–86	Philippines
Scoring by quarter: 25–29, 30–22, 20–23, 15–12
Pts: Tu S.H. 23; Rebs: six players 6 Asts: Tseng P.Y. 5		Pts: Dyke 26; Rebs: Dyke 13; Asts: Tongco 8

Al-Gharafa, Doha
Referees: Nobuyasu Aibara (JPN), Chang Yee Chuan (MAS), Hwang Intae (KOR)

August 26
19:00

Boxscore

Iran	92–36	Malaysia
Scoring by quarter: 27–5, 24–8, 26–13, 15–10
Pts: Allahverdi, Soroodi 13; Rebs: Nazarian, Yousofvand, Rezaei 6 Asts: Mehr 9		Pts: Heng Y.T. 10; Rebs: Foo T.J., Wong M.H. 6 Asts: Foo T.J. 5

Al-Gharafa, Doha
Referees: Walid Marcel Abirached (LIB), Bakr Abdulla Al-Kuwari (QAT), Xia Chun (CHN)

=== Semifinals 5th–8th ===
August 27
13:00

Boxscore

Japan	87–63	Malaysia
Scoring by quarter: 27–20, 15–11, 26–18, 19–14
Pts: Uchida 27; Rebs: Watanabe 9 Asts: Tsuyama 11		Pts: Ting C.H. 17; Rebs: Liew 9 Asts: Heng Y.T. 4

Al-Gharafa, Doha
Referees: Walid Marcel Abirached (LIB), Mohammed Ismail Altarawneh (JOR), Sadegh Ghanbaridamanab (IRI)

August 27
15:00

Boxscore

Kazakhstan	74–86	Philippines
Scoring by quarter: 20–28, 18–26, 23–13, 13–19
Pts: Danilchenko 18; Rebs: Aitkali 11; Asts: Kadyr 6		Pts: Desiderio 19; Rebs: Dyke 9 Asts: Caracut 3

Al-Gharafa, Doha
Referees: Yan Jun (CHN), Bakr Abdulla Al-Kuwari (QAT), Hwang In-Tae (KOR)

=== Semifinals ===
August 27
17:00

Boxscore

South Korea	60–78	Iran
Scoring by quarter: 15–15, 26–16, 8–22, 11–25
Pts: Jeon H.W. 16; Rebs: Jang T.B., Kim K.W. 5 Asts: Jang T.B. 7		Pts: Rezaeifar 18; Rebs: Yousofvand 17; Asts: Yousofvand 5

Al-Gharafa, Doha
Referees: Nobuyasu Aibara (JPN), Salem Alhaza'a (KUW), Yuen Chun Yip (HKG)

August 27
19:00

Boxscore

China	92–50	Chinese Taipei
Scoring by quarter: 13–13, 24–3, 28–20, 27–14
Pts: Zhao 19; Rebs: Zhou 17; Asts: Sun M.H. 6		Pts: Sun Y.C. 16; Rebs: Lin M.Y., Tseng P.Y. 5 Asts: Lin M.Y. 3

Al-Gharafa, Doha
Referees: Glenn Cornelio (PHI), Khalid Mohammed Al-Hebabi (QAT), Rajnarayan Patro (IND)

=== 7th place ===
August 28
11:00

Boxscore

Malaysia	86–74	Kazakhstan
Scoring by quarter: 20–24, 14–20, 22–15, 30–15
Pts: Tan W.J. 16; Rebs: Wong 8 Asts: Foo T.J., Heng Y.T. 3		Pts: Litvinenko 15; Rebs: Danilchenko 8 Asts: Kadyr 6

Al-Gharafa, Doha
Referees: Reynaldo Yante (PHI), Salem Alhaza'a (KUW), Chuang Chih-Chun (TPE)

=== 5th place ===
August 28
13:00

Boxscore

Japan	105–113 (OT)	Philippines
Scoring by quarter: 25–24, 24–22, 24–19, 20–28, Overtime: 12–20
Pts: Uchida 36; Rebs: Watanabe 8 Asts: Watanabe 8		Pts: Paras 27; Rebs: Dyke 12; Asts: Desiderio, Tongco 5

Al-Gharafa, Doha
Referees: Yuen Chun Yip (HKG), Hamlet Arakelyan (KAZ), Yan Jun (CHN)

=== Battle-for-Third ===
August 28
15:00

Boxscore

South Korea	70–58	Chinese Taipei
Scoring by quarter: 10–18, 18–12, 26–10, 16–18
Pts: Kim K.W. 26; Rebs: Kim K.W. 17; Asts: Byeon J.H. 7		Pts: Tseng P.Y. 12; Rebs: Lee K.Y., Tseng P.F. 8 Asts: Tseng P.Y. 3

Al-Gharafa, Doha
Referees: Walid Marcel Abirached (LIB), Rajnarayan Patro (IND), Hadi Salem (IRI)

=== Final ===
August 28
17:00

Boxscore

China	66–48	Iran
Scoring by quarter: 22–12, 14–7, 22–12, 8–17
Pts: Zhou 16; Rebs: Zou Y.C. 8 Asts: Sun M.H. 8		Pts: Rezayifar 13; Rebs: Yousofvand 8 Asts: three players 3

Al-Gharafa, Doha
Referees: Nobuyasu Aibara (JPN), Glenn Cornelio (PHI), Hwang In-Tae (KOR)

== Final standings ==
Qualified for the 2015 FIBA Under-19 World Championship

Rank	Team	Record
1st place, gold medalist(s)	China	9–0
2nd place, silver medalist(s)	Iran	7–1
3rd place, bronze medalist(s)	South Korea	6–2
4	Chinese Taipei	6–3
5	Philippines	5–3
6	Japan	5–4
7	Malaysia	3–6
8	Kazakhstan	2–6
9	Qatar	4–4
10	Jordan	1–6
11	Hong Kong	3–5
12	Kuwait	0–7
13	Iraq	0–3
14	India	1–2
