= 1989 ABC Under-18 Championship =

1989 FIBA U18 Asia Cup
10th FIBA Under-18 Asian Basketball Championship

Tournament details
- Host country: Philippines
- Dates: January 24–February 1
- Teams: 16 (from 36 federations)
- Venue(s): 2 (in 1 host city)

Final positions
- Champions: China (3rd title)

The 1989 ABC Under-18 Championship was the tenth edition of the Asian Championship for Junior Men. The tournament took place in Manila, Philippines from January 24 to February 1, 1989.

On July 19, 1988, the Basketball Association of the Philippines announced that the Philippines was given hosting rights for the tournament after the country bested bids by Malaysia, Jordan and Thailand for the hosting rights.

China successfully defended their title they won three years ago also held in Manila, this time after defeating Chinese Taipei in the championship match. The tournament host, the Philippines, avenged their quarterfinal loss to Japan by defeating them in the battle for third place.

== Preliminary round ==
All times are in Philippine Standard Time (UTC+08:00)

=== Group A ===
Team	Pld	W	L	PF	PA	PD	Pts
China	3	3	0	205	90	+115	6
Iraq	3	2	1	101	71	+30	5
Thailand	3	1	2	113	142	−19	4
Pakistan	3	0	3	94	180	−86	3

24 January
09:00

Box Scores

Pakistan	45–112	China
Scoring by half: 22–52, 23–60
Pts: Manzoor 10		Pts: Ma 26

Ninoy Aquino Stadium, Manila

24 January
20:30

[Box Scores]

Iraq	W–L	Thailand

Ninoy Aquino Stadium, Manila

25 January
14:30

Box Scores

Thailand	68–49	Pakistan
Scoring by half: 36–26, 32–23
Pts: Sirapol 19		Pts: Muhammad 16

Ninoy Aquino Stadium, Manila

25 January
19:00

[Box Scores]

China	W–L	Iraq

Ninoy Aquino Stadium, Manila

26 January
14:30

Box Scores

Iraq	101–71	Pakistan
Scoring by half: 42–37, 59–34
Pts: Yahya 18		Pts: Hussain 19

Ninoy Aquino Stadium, Manila

26 January
17:30

Box Scores

China	93–45	Thailand
Scoring by half: 37–22, 56–23
Pts: Jun 19		Pts: Pitipong 13

Rizal Memorial Coliseum, Manila

=== Group B ===
Team	Pld	W	L	PF	PA	PD	Pts
Philippines	3	3	0	275	172	+103	6
Iran	3	2	1	170	201	−31	5
India	3	1	2	191	199	−8	4
Singapore	3	0	3	167	231	−64	3

24 January
13:30

Box Scores

India	52–53	Iran
Scoring by half: 30–26, 22–27
Pts: Hurmadi 13		Pts: Sha ali 19

Rizal Memorial Coliseum, Manila

24 January
17:30

Box Scores

Singapore	55–92	Philippines
Scoring by half: 32–43, 23–49
Pts: Huan J.S. 17		Pts: Cardel 16

Ninoy Aquino Stadium, Manila

25 January
13:00

Box Scores

Iran	61–55	Singapore
Scoring by half: 34–26, 32–23
Pts: Alemzad 13		Pts: Waihao 17

Ninoy Aquino Stadium, Manila

25 January
17:30

Box Scores

Philippines	89–61	India
Scoring by half: 43–26, 46–35
Pts: Meneses 19		Pts: Shahid 14

Ninoy Aquino Stadium, Manila

26 January
10:30

Box Scores

India	78–57	Singapore
Scoring by half: 37–32, 41–25
Pts: Tripathi 20		Pts: Waihao 11

Ninoy Aquino Stadium, Manila

26 January
17:30

Box Scores

Iran	56–94	Philippines
Scoring by half: 19–46, 37–48
Pts: Alemzad 24		Pts: Cardel 20

Ninoy Aquino Stadium, Manila

=== Group C ===
Team	Pld	W	L	PF	PA	PD	Pts
Chinese Taipei	3	3	0	273	164	+109	6
Saudi Arabia	3	2	1	224	185	+39	5
Malaysia	3	1	2	181	234	−53	4
Hong Kong	3	0	3	169	264	−95	3

24 January
10:30

Box Scores

Malaysia	69–66	Hong Kong
Scoring by half: 36–34, 33–32
Pts: Chen H.K. 18		Pts: Ma K.W. 14

Ninoy Aquino Stadium, Manila

24 January
19:00

Box Scores

Chinese Taipei	77–57	Saudi Arabia
Scoring by half: 41–23, 36–34
Pts: Chou C.S. 22		Pts: Marzoug 15

Ninoy Aquino Stadium, Manila

25 January
10:30

Box Scores

Saudi Arabia	67–59	Malaysia
Scoring by half: 36–34, 31–25
Pts: Marzoug 17		Pts: Ong K.S. 18

Ninoy Aquino Stadium, Manila

25 January
16:00

Box Scores

Hong Kong	54–95	Chinese Taipei
Scoring by half: 29–49, 25–46
Pts: Lam 16		Pts: Wu 24

Ninoy Aquino Stadium, Manila

26 January
14:30

Box Scores

Saudi Arabia	100–49	Hong Kong
Scoring by half: 53–28, 47–21
Pts: Ialfahil 24		Pts: Lam 13

Ninoy Aquino Stadium, Manila

26 January
16:00

Box Scores

Chinese Taipei	101–53	Malaysia
Pts: Lung 22		Pts: Ong 11

Ninoy Aquino Stadium, Manila

=== Group D ===
Team	Pld	W	L	PF	PA	PD	Pts
Japan	3	3	0	179*	113*	+66*	6
South Korea	3	2	1	271	206	+65	5
Indonesia	3	1	2	171*	188*	−17*	4
Sri Lanka	3	0	3	166	280	−114	3

*: Points based on two games only

24 January
12:00

Box Scores

Japan	89–35	Sri Lanka
Scoring by half: 46–22, 43–13
Pts: Miura, Sako 15		Pts: Fernando 10

Ninoy Aquino Stadium, Manila

24 January
12:00

Box Scores

South Korea	101–72	Indonesia
Scoring by half: 51-27, 41-17
Pts: Oh, Moon, Chung 17		Pts: David 24

Rizal Memorial Coliseum, Manila

25 January
09:00

Box Scores

Sri Lanka	44–92	South Korea
Scoring by half: 27–51, 17–41
Pts: Da Silva, Jagath 12		Pts: Chung I.K. 20

Ninoy Aquino Stadium, Manila

25 January
20:30

[Box Scores]

Indonesia	L–W	Japan

Rizal Memorial Coliseum, Manila

26 January
09:00

Box Scores

Sri Lanka	87–99	Indonesia
Scoring by half: 42–57, 45–42
Pts: Jagath 25		Pts: David 34

Ninoy Aquino Stadium, Manila

26 January
19:00

Japan	90–78	South Korea
Scoring by half: 40-27, 50-51

Rizal Memorial Coliseum, Manila

== Quarterfinal round ==
=== Group I ===
Team	Pld	W	L	PF	PA	PD	Pts
China	3	3	0	281	156	+125	6
Chinese Taipei	3	2	1	279	234	+45	5
South Korea	3	1	2	264	280	−16	4
Iran	3	0	3	155	309	−154	3

27 January
14:30

Box Scores

China	103–37	Iran
Scoring by half: 57–14, 46–23
Pts: Ma Y. 16		Pts: Alimsad 20

Ninoy Aquino Stadium, Manila

27 January
16:00

Box Scores

Chinese Taipei	120–98	South Korea
Scoring by half: 63–57, 57–41
Pts: Ching 41		Pts: Moon 23

Ninoy Aquino Stadium, Manila

28 January
14:30

Box Scores

Chinese Taipei	103–50	Iran
Scoring by half: 59–27, 44–23
Pts: Lo 21		Pts: Alemzad 12

Ninoy Aquino Stadium, Manila

28 January
16:00

Box Scores

China	92–63	South Korea
Scoring by half: 52–27, 40–36
Pts: Ma 32		Pts: Oh 16

Ninoy Aquino Stadium, Manila

29 January

Box Scores

China	86–56	Chinese Taipei
Scoring by half: 43–27, 43–29
Pts: Jian 30		Pts: Ching 20

Ninoy Aquino Stadium, Manila

29 January

Box Scores

South Korea	103–68	Iran
Scoring by half: 56–32, 47–36
Pts: Sung Shik 19		Pts: Alemzad 12

Ninoy Aquino Stadium, Manila

=== Group II ===
Team	Pld	W	L	PF	PA	PD	Pts
Japan	3	2	1	229	231	−4	5
Philippines	3	2	1	287	249	+38	5
Saudi Arabia	3	1	2	219	234	−15	4
Iraq	3	1	2	243	264	−21	4

27 January
17:30

Box Scores

Philippines	101–79	Iraq
Scoring by half: 58–38, 43–41
Pts: Cardel 23		Pts: Yahya 25

Ninoy Aquino Stadium, Manila

27 January
19:00

Box Scores

Japan	60–55	Saudi Arabia
Scoring by half: 32–34, 28–21
Pts: Miyura 13		Pts: Ialfahail 23

Ninoy Aquino Stadium, Manila

28 January
17:30

Box Scores

Philippines	98–80	Saudi Arabia
Scoring by half: 48–40, 50–40
Pts: Pablo 19		Pts: Marzoug 23

Ninoy Aquino Stadium, Manila

28 January
19:00

Box Scores

Japan	79–88	Iraq

Ninoy Aquino Stadium, Manila

29 January
17:30

Box Scores

Philippines	88–90	Japan
Scoring by half: 48–45, 40–45
Pts: Meneses 26		Pts: Sako 24

Ninoy Aquino Stadium, Manila

29 January
19:00

Box Scores

Saudi Arabia	84–76	Iraq
Scoring by half: 48–36, 36–40

Ninoy Aquino Stadium, Manila

=== Group III ===
Team	Pld	W	L	PF	PA	PD	Pts
Thailand	3	3	0	293	185	+108	6
Malaysia	3	2	1	237	216	+21	5
Singapore	3	1	2	206	238	−32	4
Sri Lanka	3	0	3	194	270	−76	3

27 January
14:30

Box Scores

Thailand	93–69	Singapore
Scoring by half: 55–34, 38–35
Pts: Veeraphapol 19		Pts: Chan, Guan 11

Rizal Memorial Coliseum, Manila

27 January
16:00

Box Scores

Malaysia	87–48	Sri Lanka
Scoring by half: 63–57, 57–41
Pts: Chai C.H. 23		Pts: de Silva 9

Rizal Memorial Coliseum, Manila

28 January
14:30

Box Scores

Thailand	97–45	Sri Lanka
Pts: Sheeraphong, Songphob 15		Pts: Fernando 16

Rizal Memorial Coliseum, Manila

28 January
16:00

Box Scores

Malaysia	79–65	Singapore
Scoring by half: 42–33, 37–32
Pts: Cheah 19		Pts: Seow 15

Rizal Memorial Coliseum, Manila

29 January

Box Scores

Singapore	72–70	Sri Lanka
Scoring by half: 39–29, 33–41
Pts: Sheng 19		Pts: Namasivayan 27

Rizal Memorial Coliseum, Manila

29 January

Box Scores

Thailand	103–71	Malaysia
Scoring by half: 54–32, 49–39
Pts: Tetitong 24		Pts: Wah 15

Rizal Memorial Coliseum, Manila

=== Group IV ===
Team	Pld	W	L	PF	PA	PD	Pts
Indonesia	3	3	0	205	200	+5	6
India	3	2	1	189	176	+13	5
Pakistan	3	1	2	183	169	+14	4
Hong Kong	3	0	3	179	211	−32	3

27 January
17:30

Box Scores

India	50–47	Pakistan
Scoring by half: 32–27, 18–23
Pts: Shahid 24		Pts: Haider, Hussain 11

Rizal Memorial Coliseum, Manila

27 January
19:00

Box Scores

Indonesia	69–67	Hong Kong
Scoring by half: 41–38, 28–29
Pts: David 22		Pts: Wai 26

Rizal Memorial Coliseum, Manila

28 January
17:30

Box Scores

India	69–58	Hong Kong
Scoring by half: 30–40, 39–18
Pts: Tripathi 14		Pts: Lam 17

Rizal Memorial Coliseum, Manila

28 January
19:00

Box Scores

Indonesia	65–63	Pakistan
Scoring by half: 30–29, 35–34
Pts: Gunawan 31		Pts: Ahmed 15

Rizal Memorial Coliseum, Manila

29 January

Box Scores

Pakistan	73–54	Hong Kong
Scoring by half: 37–30, 36–24
Pts: Hussais 20		Pts: Chan 14

Rizal Memorial Coliseum, Manila

29 January

Box Scores

Indonesia	71–70	India
Scoring by half: 34–36, 37–34
Pts: David 29		Pts: Shahind 20

Rizal Memorial Coliseum, Manila

== Classification 5th–16th ==
=== 15th place ===
30 January
14:30

Box Scores

Sri Lanka	72–70	Hong Kong
Scoring by half: 41–35, 31–35
Pts: Fernando 27		Pts: Chan C.K. 25

Rizal Memorial Coliseum, Manila

=== 13th place ===
30 January
16:00

Box Scores

Pakistan	73–72	Singapore
Scoring by half: 44–42, 29–30
Pts: Haider, Ahmed 17		Pts: Singh 22

Rizal Memorial Coliseum, Manila

=== 11th place ===
30 January
17:30

Box Scores

Malaysia	97–87	India
Scoring by half: 49–40, 48–47
Pts: Hwa C.C. 29		Pts: Shahid 22

Rizal Memorial Coliseum, Manila

=== 9th place ===
30 January
19:00

Box Scores

Thailand	68–53	Indonesia
Scoring by half: 27–20, 41–33
Pts: Theerqyute 17		Pts: David, Ferry 13

Rizal Memorial Coliseum, Manila

=== 7th place ===
31 January
19:00

Iran	L–W	Iraq
Scoring by half: –, –

Rizal Memorial Coliseum, Manila

=== 5th place ===
31 January
13:00

Saudi Arabia	L–W	South Korea
Scoring by half: –, –

Ninoy Aquino Stadium, Manila

== Final round ==
Semifinals
31 January
Philippines	57
China	80
31 January
Japan	68
Chinese Taipei	94

Final
1 February
China	82
Chinese Taipei	61
3rd place
1 February
Philippines
Japan

=== Semifinals ===
31 January
17:30

Report

Philippines	57–80	China
Scoring by half: –, –

Ninoy Aquino Stadium, Manila

31 January
19:00

Report

Japan	68–94	Chinese Taipei
Scoring by half: –, –

Ninoy Aquino Stadium, Manila

=== 3rd place ===
1 February

Philippines	W–L	Japan
Scoring by half: –, –

Ninoy Aquino Stadium, Manila

=== Final ===
1 February

Report

China	82–61	Chinese Taipei
Scoring by half: –, –

Ninoy Aquino Stadium, Manila

== Final standing ==
Rank	Team	Record
1st place, gold medalist(s)	China	8–0
2nd place, silver medalist(s)	Chinese Taipei	6–2
3rd place, bronze medalist(s)	Philippines	6–2
4	Japan	5–3
5	South Korea	4–3
6	Saudi Arabia	3–4
7	Iraq	4–3
8	Iran	2–5
9	Thailand	5–2
10	Indonesia	4–3
11	Malaysia	4–3
12	India	3–4
13	Pakistan	2–5
14	Singapore	1–6
15	Sri Lanka	1–6
16	Hong Kong	0–7

== Awards ==
1989 Asian Under-18 champions

China
Third title

== See also ==
- 1989 ABC Under-18 Championship for Women
