= Indonesia men's national under-18 basketball team =

Indonesian youth national basketball team

Indonesia U-18
- FIBA zone: FIBA Asia
- National federation: PERBASI

FIBA U-19 World Cup
- Appearances: 1
- Medals: None

FIBA U-18 Asia Cup
- Appearances: 12
- Medals: None

The Indonesia men's national under-18 basketball team is a national basketball team of Indonesia, administered by the Indonesian Basketball Association ("PERBASI"). It represents the country in international under-18 men's basketball competitions.

== FIBA Under-19 Basketball World Cup participations ==
Year	Pos.	Pld	W	L
(Brazil) 1979	Did not qualify			
(Spain) 1983	Did not qualify			
(Italy) 1987	Did not qualify			
(Canada) 1991	Did not qualify			
(Greece) 1995	Did not qualify			
(Portugal) 1999	Did not qualify			
(Greece) 2003	Did not qualify			
(Serbia) 2007	Did not qualify			
(New Zealand) 2009	Did not qualify			
(Latvia) 2011	Did not qualify			
(Czech Republic) 2013	Did not qualify			
(Greece) 2015	Did not qualify			
(Egypt) 2017	Did not qualify			
(Greece) 2019	Did not qualify			
(Latvia) 2021	Did not qualify			
(Hungary) 2023	Did not qualify			
(Switzerland) 2025	Did not qualify			
(Czech Republic) 2027	Did not qualify			
(Indonesia) 2029	Qualified as host			
Total	1/19	0	0	0

== FIBA Under-18 Asia Cup participations ==
Year	Result
1977	13th
1978	6th
1980	11th
1982	8th
1989	10th
1990	12th
1992	6th
1995	8th
2012	11th
2016	12th
2018	12th
2024	13th

== Current roster ==
Indonesia U18 roster
Players
Coaches

Pos.	No.	Name	Age – Date of birth	Height	Club	Ctr.
C	0	Halmaheranno Hady	18 – March 21, 2006	1.92 m (6 ft 4 in)	Bhinneka Solo	(Indonesia)
SG	1	Stephen Sundinata	17 – March 31, 2007	1.82 m (6 ft 0 in)	Aras Gading Muda	(Indonesia)
C	2	Marcell Putra	18 – April 9, 2006	1.95 m (6 ft 5 in)	GMC Cirebon	(Indonesia)
SF	6	I Nyoman Aldo Putra	18 – January 1, 2006	1.86 m (6 ft 1 in)	Southern Wolves Bali	(Indonesia)
PG	7	Justin Patrick Alex	17 – November 11, 2006	1.80 m (5 ft 11 in)	CLS Surabaya	(Indonesia)
PG	9	Kennie Elbert Kristanto	17 – September 20, 2006	1.76 m (5 ft 9 in)	WBS Surabaya	(Indonesia)
SG	11	Gerrard Matthew Boentara	16 – November 20, 2007	1.78 m (5 ft 10 in)	CLS Surabaya	(Indonesia)
SG	12	I Gusti Ngurah Putu Krisnanjaya	17 – May 10, 2007	1.80 m (5 ft 11 in)	Merpati Bali	(Indonesia)
PF	13	Richie Bertrand Linardi	18 – May 1, 2006	1.84 m (6 ft 0 in)	CLS Surabaya	(Indonesia)
SG	14	Jeremy Abner Aritonang	17 – August 9, 2007	1.82 m (6 ft 0 in)	Aras Gading Muda	(Indonesia)
SF	17	I Ketut Gede Bayu Prayoga Putra	16 – November 12, 2007	1.86 m (6 ft 1 in)	Merpati Bali	(Indonesia)
C	21	Raiz Nugraha Auliariza	17 – August 26, 2007	1.92 m (6 ft 4 in)	Aras Gading Muda	(Indonesia)

Head coach

- (Indonesia) Andrie Ekayana Santosa

Assistant coach(es)

- (Indonesia) Alfa Hari Kusuma Paiker

Legend

- Club – describes last
  club before the tournament
- Age – describes age

== See also ==
- Indonesia men's national basketball team
- Indonesia men's national under-16 basketball team
- Indonesia women's national under-18 basketball team
