= 1980 ABC Under-18 Championship =

Tournament details
- Host country: Thailand
- Dates: November 1–12
- Teams: 17 (from all Asian federations)
- Venue: 1 (in 1 host city)

Final positions
- Champions: China (1st title)

The 1980 ABC Under-18 Championship was the sixth edition of the Asian Basketball Confederation (ABC)'s Junior Championship. The games were held at Bangkok, Thailand from November 1–12, 1980.

After finishing runners-up from the previous two editions, China won their first-ever championship, after defeating the five-time defending champions, the Philippines, 94-84, in the Championship Round.

== Venue ==
The games were held at National Stadium, located in Bangkok.

== Preliminary round ==
=== Group A ===
Pos	Team	Pld	W	L	PF	PA	PD	Pts	Qualification
1	Philippines	4	4	0	504	254	+250	8	Championship round
2	Thailand (H)	4	3	1	265	218	+47	7	Championship round
3	Malaysia	4	2	2	291	345	−54	6	Classification 7th-12th
4	Indonesia	4	1	3	251	281	−30	5	Classification 7th-12th
5	Bangladesh	4	0	4	222	435	−213	4	Classification 13th-17th

Source: []
Rules for classification: 1) Points; 2) Head-to-head results; 3) Points difference; 4) Points scored.
(H) Hosts

1 November 1980

Report

Thailand	106–50	Bangladesh
Scoring by half: −, −

National Stadium, Bangkok

2 November 1980

Report

Malaysia	89–49	Bangladesh
Scoring by half: −, −

National Stadium, Bangkok

2 November 1980

Thailand	W–L	Indonesia
Scoring by half: −, −

National Stadium, Bangkok

3 November 1980

Report

Philippines	130–56	Malaysia
Scoring by half: 59−33, 71−23

National Stadium, Bangkok

4 November 1980

Report

Philippines	120–68	Indonesia
Scoring by half: 68−28, 52−40

National Stadium, Bangkok

4 November 1980

Report

Thailand	80–57	Malaysia
Scoring by half: 36−20, 44−37

National Stadium, Bangkok

5 November 1980

Report

Philippines	143–51	Bangladesh
Scoring by half: −, −

National Stadium, Bangkok

5 November 1980

Report

Malaysia	89–86	Indonesia
Scoring by half: −, −

National Stadium, Bangkok

6 November 1980

Report

Indonesia	97–72	Bangladesh
Scoring by half: 49−31, 48−41

National Stadium, Bangkok

6 November 1980

Report

Philippines	111–79	Thailand
Scoring by half: 56−33, 55−46

National Stadium, Bangkok

=== Group B ===
Pos	Team	Pld	W	L	PF	PA	PD	Pts	Qualification
1	China	4	4	0	477	185	+292	8	Championship round
2	Kuwait	4	4	0	295	188	+107	8	Championship round
3	Singapore	4	2	2	264	314	−50	6	Classification 7th-12th
4	India	4	1	3	274	345	−71	5	Classification 7th-12th
5	Hong Kong	4	1	3	278	328	−50	5	Classification 13th-17th
6	Sri Lanka	4	0	4	161	389	−228	4	Classification 13th-17th

Updated to match(es) played on 6 November 1980. Source: []
Rules for classification: 1) Points; 2) Head-to-head results; 3) Points difference; 4) Points scored.

1 November 1980

Report

China	110–59	India
Scoring by half: −, −

National Stadium, Bangkok

1 November 1980

Report

Kuwait	80–42	Hong Kong
Scoring by half: −, −

National Stadium, Bangkok

3 November 1980

Report

Singapore	85–44	Sri Lanka
Scoring by half: −, −

National Stadium, Bangkok

3 November 1980

Report

China	114–61	Hong Kong
Scoring by half: −, −

National Stadium, Bangkok

3 November 1980

Report

Kuwait	68–50	India
Scoring by half: −, −

National Stadium, Bangkok

4 November 1980

Report

Kuwait	69–54	Singapore
Scoring by half: 43−27, 26−27

National Stadium, Bangkok

4 November 1980

Report

China	130–28	Sri Lanka
Scoring by half: 61−16, 69−12

National Stadium, Bangkok

4 November 1980

Report

India	87–79	Hong Kong
Scoring by half: 44−44, 43−35

National Stadium, Bangkok

5 November 1980

Report

Hong Kong	96–47	Sri Lanka
Scoring by half: −, −

National Stadium, Bangkok

5 November 1980

Report

Singapore	88–78	India
Scoring by half: −, −

National Stadium, Bangkok

6 November 1980

Report

China	123–37	Singapore
Scoring by half: 63−10, 60−27

National Stadium, Bangkok

6 November 1980

Report

Kuwait	78–42	Sri Lanka
Scoring by half: 41−20, 36−22

National Stadium, Bangkok

3 November 1980

[Report]

India	vs.	Sri Lanka
Scoring by half: –, –

National Stadium, Bangkok

3 November 1980

[Report]

Hong Kong	vs.	Singapore
Scoring by half: –, –

National Stadium, Bangkok

6 November 1980

[Report]

Kuwait	vs.	China
Scoring by half: –, –

National Stadium, Bangkok

=== Group C ===
Pos	Team	Pld	W	L	PF	PA	PD	Pts	Qualification
1	Saudi Arabia	4	4	0	362	231	+131	8	Championship round
2	Japan	4	3	1	404	231	+173	7	Championship round
3	South Korea	4	3	1	355	299	+56	7	Classification 7th-12th
4	Bahrain	4	2	2	321	255	+66	6	Classification 7th-12th
5	United Arab Emirates	4	0	4	211	369	−158	4	Classification 13th-17th
6	Qatar	4	0	4	195	463	−268	4	Classification 13th-17th

Updated to match(es) played on 6 November 1980. Source: []
Rules for classification: 1) Points; 2) Head-to-head results; 3) Points difference; 4) Points scored.

3 November 1980

Report

South Korea	114–70	Qatar
Scoring by half: 71−28, 43−42

National Stadium, Bangkok

3 November 1980

Report

Saudi Arabia	65–59	Bahrain
Scoring by half: −, −

National Stadium, Bangkok

3 November 1980

Report

Japan	87–27	United Arab Emirates
Scoring by half: −, −

National Stadium, Bangkok

4 November 1980

Report

Saudi Arabia	91–70	South Korea
Scoring by half: 62−14, 29−56

National Stadium, Bangkok

4 November 1980

Report

Japan	157–39	Qatar
Scoring by half: 62−14, 95−25

National Stadium, Bangkok

4 November 1980

Report

Bahrain	83–53	United Arab Emirates
Scoring by half: 36−20, 47−33

National Stadium, Bangkok

5 November 1980

Report

South Korea	77–63	Japan
Scoring by half: −, −

National Stadium, Bangkok

5 November 1980

Report

Saudi Arabia	105–56	United Arab Emirates
Scoring by half: −, −

National Stadium, Bangkok

5 November 1980

Report

Bahrain	91–40	Qatar
Scoring by half: −, −

National Stadium, Bangkok

6 November 1980

Report

South Korea	94–75	United Arab Emirates
Scoring by half: 47−34, 47−41

National Stadium, Bangkok

6 November 1980

Report

Japan	97–88	Bahrain
Scoring by half: 48−39, 49−49

National Stadium, Bangkok

6 November 1980

Report

Saudi Arabia	101–46	Qatar
Scoring by half: 48−26, 53−20

National Stadium, Bangkok

3 November 1980

[Report]

Bahrain	vs.	South Korea
Scoring by half: –, –

National Stadium, Bangkok

3 November 1980

[Report]

Qatar	vs.	United Arab Emirates
Scoring by half: –, –

National Stadium, Bangkok

3 November 1980

[Report]

Japan	vs.	Saudi Arabia
Scoring by half: –, –

National Stadium, Bangkok

== Final round ==
=== Classification 13th–17th ===
Team	Pld	W	L	PF	PA	PD	Pts
Sri Lanka	3	3	0	234	217	+17	6
Hong Kong	2	2	0	223	95	+128	4
Bangladesh	3	2	1	234	204	+30	5
United Arab Emirates	3	0	3	190	251	-61	3
Qatar	3	0	3	186	300	-114	3

8 November 1980

Report

Bangladesh	82–56	Qatar
Scoring by half: –, –

National Stadium, Bangkok

8 November 1980

Report

Sri Lanka	84–77	United Arab Emirates
Scoring by half: –, –

National Stadium, Bangkok

9 November 1980

Report

United Arab Emirates	76–84	Bangladesh
Scoring by half: –, –

National Stadium, Bangkok

9 November 1980

Report

Qatar	58–140	Hong Kong
Scoring by half: –, –

National Stadium, Bangkok

11 November 1980

Report

Sri Lanka	78–72	Qatar
Scoring by half: –, –

National Stadium, Bangkok

11 November 1980

Report

Hong Kong	83–37	United Arab Emirates
Scoring by half: –, –

National Stadium, Bangkok

12 November 1980

Report

Bangladesh	68–72	Sri Lanka
Scoring by half: –, –

National Stadium, Bangkok

=== Classification 7th–12th ===
Team	Pld	W	L	PF	PA	PD	Pts
South Korea	4	4	0	422	296	+126	8
Bahrain	4	4	0	322	254	+68	8
Malaysia	4	2	2	308	326	-18	6
Indonesia	4	2	2	279	324	-45	6
Singapore	4	0	4	259	337	-78	4
India	4	0	4	276	349	-73	4

8 November 1980

Report

Malaysia	82–76	India
Scoring by half: –, –

National Stadium, Bangkok

8 November 1980

Report

Singapore	67–97	South Korea
Scoring by half: –, –

National Stadium, Bangkok

8 November 1980

Report

Bahrain	82–61	Indonesia
Scoring by half: –, –

National Stadium, Bangkok

9 November 1980

Report

Malaysia	82–77	Singapore
Scoring by half: –, –

National Stadium, Bangkok

9 November 1980

Report

Indonesia	69–116	South Korea
Scoring by half: –, –

National Stadium, Bangkok

9 November 1980

Report

India	68–88	Bahrain
Scoring by half: –, –

National Stadium, Bangkok

11 November 1980

Report

Singapore	53–75	Indonesia
Scoring by half: 32–29, 21–46

National Stadium, Bangkok

11 November 1980

Report

South Korea	105–79	India
Scoring by half: –, –

National Stadium, Bangkok

11 November 1980

Report

Bahrain	69–63	Malaysia
Scoring by half: –, –

National Stadium, Bangkok

12 November 1980

Report

Bahrain	83–62	Singapore
Scoring by half: 50–26, 33–36

National Stadium, Bangkok

12 November 1980

Report

Indonesia	74–73	India
Scoring by half: 30–37, 44–36

National Stadium, Bangkok

12 November 1980

Report

South Korea	104–81	Malaysia
Scoring by half: 55–33, 49–48

National Stadium, Bangkok

=== Championship ===
Team	Pld	W	L	PF	PA	PD	Pts
China	5	5	0	472	320	+152	10
Philippines	5	4	1	501	423	+78	9
Thailand	4	2	2	296	338	-42	6
Saudi Arabia	4	1	3	327	386	-59	5
Japan	4	1	3	317	382	-65	5
Kuwait	4	0	4	242	306	-64	4

8 November 1980

Report

Philippines	97–67	Kuwait
Scoring by half: –, –

National Stadium, Bangkok

8 November 1980

Report

Japan	82–116	China
Scoring by half: –, –

National Stadium, Bangkok

8 November 1980

Report

Thailand	87–71	Saudi Arabia
Scoring by half: –, –

National Stadium, Bangkok

9 November 1980

Report

Philippines	104–83	Japan
Scoring by half: 44–49, 60–34

National Stadium, Bangkok

9 November 1980

Report

China	90–42	Saudi Arabia
Scoring by half: –, –

National Stadium, Bangkok

9 November 1980

Report

Kuwait	70–75	Thailand
Scoring by half: –, –

National Stadium, Bangkok

11 November 1980

Report

Japan	93–109	Saudi Arabia
Scoring by half: –, –

National Stadium, Bangkok

11 November 1980

Report

China	75–52	Kuwait
Scoring by half: –, –

National Stadium, Bangkok

11 November 1980

Report

Thailand	74–100	Philippines
Scoring by half: –, –

National Stadium, Bangkok

12 November 1980

Report

Japan	59–53	Kuwait
Scoring by half: 25–22, 34–31

National Stadium, Bangkok

12 November 1980

Report

Saudi Arabia	105–116	Philippines
Scoring by half: 40–44, 65–72

National Stadium, Bangkok

12 November 1980

Report

China	97–60	Thailand
Scoring by half: 63–30, 34–30

National Stadium, Bangkok

13 November 1980

[Report]

Kuwait	vs.	Saudi Arabia
Scoring by half: –, –

National Stadium, Bangkok

13 November 1980

[Report]

Thailand	vs.	Japan
Scoring by half: –, –

National Stadium, Bangkok

13 November 1980

Report

Philippines	84–94	China
Scoring by half: 45–56, 39–38

National Stadium, Bangkok

== Final standing ==
Rank	Team	Record
1st place, gold medalist(s)	China	10–0
2nd place, silver medalist(s)	Philippines	8–1
3rd place, bronze medalist(s)	Thailand	6–3
4	Saudi Arabia	6–4
5	Japan	5–5
6	Kuwait	4–6
7	South Korea	8–1
8	Bahrain	6–3
9	Malaysia	4–4
10	Indonesia	3–5
11	Singapore	3–6
12	India	2–7
13	Sri Lanka	3–5
14	Hong Kong	3–4
15	Bangladesh	2–4
16	Qatar	1–7
17	United Arab Emirates	0–8
