= 1982 ABC Under-18 Championship =

Tournament details
- Host country: Philippines
- Dates: October 4–17
- Teams: 16 (from all Asian federations)
- Venue: 1 (in 1 host city)

Final positions
- Champions: Philippines (6th title)

The 1982 ABC Under-18 Championship was the seventh edition of the Asian Basketball Confederation (ABC)'s Junior Championship. The games were held at Quezon City, Philippines from October 4–17, 1982.

Hosts the Philippines were able to regain the championship after subduing the defending champions China, 74-63, in the Championship Round, to win their sixth overall title.

== Venue ==
The games were held at Araneta Coliseum, located in Quezon City.

== Preliminary round ==
=== Group A ===
Team	Pld	W	L	PF	PA	PD	Pts
China	7	7	0	0	0	0	14
Malaysia	7	5	2	0	0	0	12
Japan	7	5	2	0	0	0	12
Bahrain	7	4	3	0	0	0	11
Saudi Arabia	7	4	3	0	0	0	11
India	7	2	5	0	0	0	9
Iran	7	2	5	0	0	0	9
United Arab Emirates	7	1	6	0	0	0	8

4 October 1982

Report

Malaysia	72–64	Bahrain

Araneta Coliseum, Quezon City

4 October 1982

Report

United Arab Emirates	51–46	Saudi Arabia

Araneta Coliseum, Quezon City

4 October 1982

Report

China	104–40	Iran

Araneta Coliseum, Quezon City

5 October 1982

Report

China	89–35	United Arab Emirates

Araneta Coliseum, Quezon City

5 October 1982

Report

Saudi Arabia	75–68	India

Araneta Coliseum, Quezon City

5 October 1982

Report

Japan	90–79	Iran

Araneta Coliseum, Quezon City

6 October 1982

Report

Japan	90–39	United Arab Emirates

Araneta Coliseum, Quezon City

6 October 1982

Report

Bahrain	83–63	Saudi Arabia

Araneta Coliseum, Quezon City

6 October 1982

[Report]

China	vs.	Malaysia

Araneta Coliseum, Quezon City

6 October 1982

[Report]

India	vs.	Iran

Araneta Coliseum, Quezon City

7 October 1982

[Report]

China	vs.	India

Araneta Coliseum, Quezon City

7 October 1982

[Report]

Japan	vs.	Bahrain

Araneta Coliseum, Quezon City

7 October 1982

[Report]

Iran	vs.	United Arab Emirates

Araneta Coliseum, Quezon City

8 October 1982

Report

China	95–55	Bahrain

Araneta Coliseum, Quezon City

8 October 1982

Report

Saudi Arabia	77–70	Iran

Araneta Coliseum, Quezon City

8 October 1982

Report

Malaysia	60–52	United Arab Emirates

Araneta Coliseum, Quezon City

9 October 1982

[Report]

Japan	vs.	Saudi Arabia

Araneta Coliseum, Quezon City

9 October 1982

[Report]

Malaysia	vs.	India

Araneta Coliseum, Quezon City

10 October 1982

Report

China	114–44	Japan

Araneta Coliseum, Quezon City

10 October 1982

Report

Bahrain	93–67	India

Araneta Coliseum, Quezon City

10 October 1982

Report

Malaysia	82–81	Iran

Araneta Coliseum, Quezon City

11 October 1982

Report

Saudi Arabia	62–58	Malaysia

Araneta Coliseum, Quezon City

11 October 1982

Report

Bahrain	83–71	United Arab Emirates

Araneta Coliseum, Quezon City

11 October 1982

Report

Japan	81–65	India

Araneta Coliseum, Quezon City

12 October 1982

Report

Malaysia	96–89	Japan

Araneta Coliseum, Quezon City

12 October 1982

Report

Iran	108–97	Bahrain

Araneta Coliseum, Quezon City

12 October 1982

Report

India	96–75	United Arab Emirates

Araneta Coliseum, Quezon City

12 October 1982

Report

China	85–44	Saudi Arabia

Araneta Coliseum, Quezon City

=== Group B ===
Team	Pld	W	L	PF	PA	PD	Pts
Philippines	7	7	0	0	0	0	14
South Korea	7	6	1	0	0	0	13
Thailand	7	5	2	0	0	0	12
Singapore	7	3	4	0	0	0	10
Hong Kong	7	2	5	0	0	0	9
Indonesia	7	2	5	0	0	0	9
Qatar	7	2	5	0	0	0	9
Kuwait	7	1	6	0	0	0	8

3 October 1982

Report

South Korea	105–62	Singapore
Scoring by half: 64-29, 41-33

Araneta Coliseum, Quezon City

3 October 1982

Report

Thailand	77–51	Qatar

Araneta Coliseum, Quezon City

3 October 1982

Report

Philippines	86–42	Hong Kong

Araneta Coliseum, Quezon City

4 October 1982

Report

Philippines	92–30	Qatar

Araneta Coliseum, Quezon City

4 October 1982

Report

Thailand	80–53	Indonesia

Araneta Coliseum, Quezon City

4 October 1982

Report

Hong Kong	67–55	Kuwait

Araneta Coliseum, Quezon City

5 October 1982

Report

Singapore	85–81	Indonesia

Araneta Coliseum, Quezon City

5 October 1982

Report

Qatar	55–42	Kuwait

Araneta Coliseum, Quezon City

5 October 1982

South Korea	107–32	Kuwait
Scoring by half: 52-17, 55-15

Araneta Coliseum, Quezon City

6 October 1982

[Report]

Hong Kong	vs.	Indonesia

Araneta Coliseum, Quezon City

6 October 1982

South Korea	105–74	Thailand
Scoring by half: 63-31, 42-43

Araneta Coliseum, Quezon City

6 October 1982

[Report]

Philippines	vs.	Singapore

Araneta Coliseum, Quezon City

7 October 1982

Report

Philippines	81–74	South Korea
Scoring by half: 39-34, 42-40

Araneta Coliseum, Quezon City

7 October 1982

Report

Singapore	62–54	Qatar

Araneta Coliseum, Quezon City

7 October 1982

Report

Thailand	86–63	Hong Kong

Araneta Coliseum, Quezon City

8 October 1982

[Report]

Hong Kong	vs.	Qatar

Araneta Coliseum, Quezon City

8 October 1982

[Report]

Philippines	vs.	Indonesia

Araneta Coliseum, Quezon City

8 October 1982

[Report]

Thailand	vs.	Kuwait

Araneta Coliseum, Quezon City

9 October 1982

Report

Hong Kong	96–90	Singapore
Scoring by half: 48–59, 48–31

Araneta Coliseum, Quezon City

9 October 1982

Report

Philippines	94–41	Kuwait

Araneta Coliseum, Quezon City

9 October 1982

Report

South Korea	114–57	Indonesia
Scoring by half: 61-30, 53-27

Araneta Coliseum, Quezon City

10 October 1982

Report

Thailand	111–95	Singapore

Araneta Coliseum, Quezon City

10 October 1982

Report

South Korea	90–40	Qatar
Scoring by half: 43-12, 47-28

Araneta Coliseum, Quezon City

10 October 1982

Report

Kuwait	73–72	Indonesia

Araneta Coliseum, Quezon City

11 October 1982

Report

Singapore	81–65	Kuwait

Araneta Coliseum, Quezon City

11 October 1982

Report

South Korea	96–58	Hong Kong
Scoring by half: 39-32, 57-26

Araneta Coliseum, Quezon City

11 October 1982

Report

Philippines	102–57	Thailand

Araneta Coliseum, Quezon City

11 October 1982

Report

Indonesia	57–50	Qatar

Araneta Coliseum, Quezon City

== Final round ==
=== Championship ===
Team	Pld	W	L	PF	PA	PD	Pts
Philippines	5	5	0	0	0	0	10
China	5	4	1	0	0	0	9
South Korea	5	3	2	0	0	0	8
Thailand	5	1	4	0	0	0	6
Malaysia	5	1	4	0	0	0	6
Japan	5	1	4	0	0	0	6

The results from preliminary round with teams in the final round was carried over to the final round. Ties were broken by points differences.

15 October 1982

Report

China	93–56	Thailand

Araneta Coliseum, Quezon City

15 October 1982

Report

South Korea	97–65	Japan

Araneta Coliseum, Quezon City

15 October 1982

Report

Philippines	91–74	Malaysia

Araneta Coliseum, Quezon City

16 October 1982

[Report]

Philippines	vs.	Japan

Araneta Coliseum, Quezon City

16 October 1982

[Report]

China	87–63	South Korea
Scoring by half: 45-29, 42-34

Araneta Coliseum, Quezon City

16 October 1982

[Report]

Thailand	vs.	Malaysia

Araneta Coliseum, Quezon City

October 1982

[Report]

South Korea	87–57	Malaysia
Scoring by half: 51-20, 36-37

Araneta Coliseum, Quezon City

October 1982

[Report]

Japan	vs.	Thailand

Araneta Coliseum, Quezon City

17 October 1982

Report

Philippines	74–63	China

Araneta Coliseum, Quezon City
