= 1998 ABC Under-18 Championship =

Junior championship for basketball

1998 FIBA U18 Asia Cup
th FIBA Under-18 Asian Basketball Championship

Tournament details
- Host country: India
- Dates: 5–13 November
- Teams: 15 (from 44 federations)
- Venue: 1 (in 1 host city)

Final positions
- Champions: China (6th title)

Tournament statistics
- MVP: (China) Yao Ming

The ABC Under-18 Championship 1998 is the 15th edition of the ABC's junior championship for basketball. The games were held at Kolkata, India from 5–13 November 1998.

== Preliminary round ==
=== Group A ===
Team	Pld	W	L	PF	PA	PD	Pts	Tiebreaker
China	3	2	1	250	159	+91	5	1–0
Iran	3	2	1	228	191	+37	5	0–1
Hong Kong	3	1	2	155	264	−109	4	1–0
Lebanon	3	1	2	198	217	−19	4	0–1

5 November
18:00

Hong Kong	76–66	Lebanon
Scoring by half: 30–28, 36–48

Netaji Indoor Stadium, Kolkata

5 November
19:30

China	81–58	Iran
Scoring by half: 44–19, 37–39

Netaji Indoor Stadium, Kolkata

6 November
17:00

Lebanon	59–54	China
Scoring by half: 28–27, 31–27

Netaji Indoor Stadium, Kolkata

6 November
18:30

Iran	73–47	Hong Kong
Scoring by half: 35–29, 38–18

Netaji Indoor Stadium, Kolkata

7 November
11:00

China	115–42	Hong Kong
Scoring by half: 51–24, 64–18

Netaji Indoor Stadium, Kolkata

8 November
15:30

Iran	97–63	Lebanon
Scoring by half: 44–26, 53–37

Netaji Indoor Stadium, Kolkata

=== Group B ===
Team	Pld	W	L	PF	PA	PD	Pts
Qatar	3	3	0	253	142	+111	6
Malaysia	3	2	1	211	220	−9	5
India	3	1	2	228	223	+5	4
Pakistan	3	0	3	146	253	−107	3

5 November
16:30

India	76–87	Malaysia
Scoring by half: 44–48, 32–39

Netaji Indoor Stadium, Kolkata

6 November
14:00

Qatar	87–32	Pakistan
Scoring by half: 29–14, 58–18

Netaji Indoor Stadium, Kolkata

7 November
9:30

Malaysia	52–87	Qatar
Scoring by half: 32–48, 20–39

Netaji Indoor Stadium, Kolkata

7 November
15:30

Pakistan	57–94	India
Scoring by half: 35–42, 22–52

Netaji Indoor Stadium, Kolkata

8 November
14:00

Qatar	79–58	India
Scoring by half: 31–22, 48–36

Netaji Indoor Stadium, Kolkata

8 November
17:00

Pakistan	57–72	Malaysia
Scoring by half: 31–40, 26–32

Netaji Indoor Stadium, Kolkata

=== Group C ===
Team	Pld	W	L	PF	PA	PD	Pts
Japan	3	3	0	310	131	+179	6
Philippines	3	2	1	263	162	+101	5
Kuwait	3	1	2	146	193	−47	4
Bangladesh	3	0	3	89	322	−233	3

6 November
9:30

Bangladesh	21–67	Kuwait
Scoring by half: 11–33, 10–34

Netaji Indoor Stadium, Kolkata

6 November
15:30

Japan	81–65	Philippines
Scoring by half: 45–35, 36–30

Netaji Indoor Stadium, Kolkata

7 November
12:30

Bangladesh	30–147	Japan
Scoring by half: 15–68, 15–79

Netaji Indoor Stadium, Kolkata

7 November
14:00

Kuwait	43–90	Philippines
Scoring by half: 20–45, 23–45

Netaji Indoor Stadium, Kolkata

8 November
9:30

Japan	82–36	Kuwait
Scoring by half: 34–16, 48–20

Netaji Indoor Stadium, Kolkata

8 November
11:00

Philippines	108–38	Bangladesh
Scoring by half: 60–20, 48–18

Netaji Indoor Stadium, Kolkata

=== Group D ===
Team	Pld	W	L	PF	PA	PD	Pts
Chinese Taipei	2	2	0	202	171	+31	4
Kazakhstan	2	1	1	155	184	−29	3
South Korea	2	0	2	173	175	−2	2

6 November
11:00

Chinese Taipei	106–76	Kazakhstan
Scoring by half: 58–38, 48–38

Netaji Indoor Stadium, Kolkata

7 November
17:00

South Korea	95–96	Chinese Taipei
Scoring by half: 53–49, 42–47

Netaji Indoor Stadium, Kolkata

8 November
12:30

Kazakhstan	79–78 (OT)	South Korea
Scoring by half: 39–33, 30–36 Overtime: 10–9

Netaji Indoor Stadium, Kolkata

== Quarterfinal round ==
=== Group I ===
Team	Pld	W	L	PF	PA	PD	Pts
China	3	3	0	271	178	+93	6
Japan	3	2	1	275	235	+40	5
Kazakhstan	3	1	2	242	260	−18	4
Malaysia	3	0	3	183	298	−115	3

9 November
16:30

Malaysia	55–97	Japan
Scoring by half: 34–47, 21–50

Netaji Indoor Stadium, Kolkata

9 November
18:00

China	83–49	Kazakhstan
Scoring by half: 33–25, 50–24

Netaji Indoor Stadium, Kolkata

10 November
17:00

Japan	97–89	Kazakhstan
Scoring by half: 61–48, 36–41

Netaji Indoor Stadium, Kolkata

10 November
18:30

China	97–48	Malaysia
Scoring by half: 52–29, 45–19

Netaji Indoor Stadium, Kolkata

11 November
12:00

Malaysia	80–104	Kazakhstan
Scoring by half: 42–48, 38–56

Netaji Indoor Stadium, Kolkata

11 November
18:30

China	91–81	Japan
Scoring by half: 40–40, 51–41

Netaji Indoor Stadium, Kolkata

=== Group II ===
Team	Pld	W	L	PF	PA	PD	Pts
Qatar	3	3	0	220	164	+56	6
Chinese Taipei	3	2	1	242	230	+12	5
Iran	3	1	2	196	220	−24	4
Philippines	3	0	3	196	240	−44	3

9 November
13:30

Iran	79–96	Chinese Taipei
Scoring by half: 39–61, 40–35

Netaji Indoor Stadium, Kolkata

9 November
15:00

Qatar	84–57	Philippines
Scoring by half: 40–31, 44–26

Netaji Indoor Stadium, Kolkata

10 November
12:00

Iran	53–68	Qatar
Scoring by half: 28–33, 25–35

Netaji Indoor Stadium, Kolkata

10 November
13:30

Philippines	83–92	Chinese Taipei
Scoring by half: 50–43, 33–49

Netaji Indoor Stadium, Kolkata

11 November
13:30

Iran	64–56	Philippines
Scoring by half: 31–29, 33–27

Netaji Indoor Stadium, Kolkata

11 November
17:00

Qatar	68–54	Chinese Taipei
Scoring by half: 31–24, 37–30

Netaji Indoor Stadium, Kolkata

=== Group III ===
Team	Pld	W	L	PF	PA	PD	Pts
South Korea	3	3	0	355	177	+178	6
India	3	2	1	261	238	+23	5
Lebanon	3	1	2	233	225	+8	4
Bangladesh	3	0	3	156	365	−209	3

9 November
10:30

Lebanon	60–85	South Korea
Scoring by half: 25–46, 35–39

Netaji Indoor Stadium, Kolkata

9 November
12:00

India	102–58	Bangladesh
Scoring by half: 47–25, 55–33

Netaji Indoor Stadium, Kolkata

10 November
10:30

Bangladesh	48–148	South Korea
Scoring by half: 28–67, 20–81

Netaji Indoor Stadium, Kolkata

10 November
15:15

Lebanon	58–90	India
Scoring by half: 29–37, 29–53

Netaji Indoor Stadium, Kolkata

11 November
10:30

Lebanon	115–50	Bangladesh
Scoring by half: 59–22, 56–28

Netaji Indoor Stadium, Kolkata

11 November
15:15

South Korea	122–69	India
Scoring by half: 60–33, 62–36

Netaji Indoor Stadium, Kolkata

=== Group IV ===
Team	Pld	W	L	PF	PA	PD	Pts
Hong Kong	2	2	0	135	97	+38	4
Kuwait	2	1	1	109	131	−22	3
Pakistan	2	0	2	113	129	−16	2

9 November
9:00

Hong Kong	69–46	Kuwait
Scoring by half: 34–19, 35–27

Netaji Indoor Stadium, Kolkata

10 November
9:00

Hong Kong	66–51	Pakistan
Scoring by half: 33–24, 33–27

Netaji Indoor Stadium, Kolkata

11 November
9:00

Pakistan	62–63	Kuwait
Scoring by half: 36–36, 26–27

Netaji Indoor Stadium, Kolkata

== Classification 5th–14th ==
=== 13th place ===
12 November
8:00

Pakistan	45–73	Lebanon
Scoring by half: 27–42, 18–31

Netaji Indoor Stadium, Kolkata

=== 11th place ===
12 November
9:30

Kuwait	77–94	India
Scoring by half: 43–53, 34–41

Netaji Indoor Stadium, Kolkata

=== 9th place ===
12 November
11:00

Hong Kong	64–103	South Korea
Scoring by half: 27–54, 37–49

Netaji Indoor Stadium, Kolkata

=== 7th place ===
13 November
9:00

Malaysia	50–95	Philippines
Scoring by half: 18–37, 32–58

Netaji Indoor Stadium, Kolkata

=== 5th place ===
13 November
10:30

Kazakhstan	67–83	Iran
Scoring by half: 38–41, 29–42

Netaji Indoor Stadium, Kolkata

== Final round ==
Semifinals
November 12
China	95
Chinese Taipei	73
November 12
Japan	66
Qatar	78

Final
November 13
China	59
Qatar	45
3rd place
November 13
Chinese Taipei	94
Japan	110

=== Semifinals ===
12 November
15:00

China	95–73	Chinese Taipei
Scoring by half: 48–29, 47–44

Netaji Indoor Stadium, Kolkata

12 November
16:45

Japan	66–78	Qatar
Scoring by half: 34–46, 32–32

Netaji Indoor Stadium, Kolkata

=== 3rd place ===
13 November
12:00

Chinese Taipei	94–110	Japan
Scoring by half: 55–64, 39–46

Netaji Indoor Stadium, Kolkata

=== Final ===
13 November
15:00

China	59–45	Qatar
Scoring by half: 26–21, 33–24

Netaji Indoor Stadium, Kolkata

== Final standing ==
Qualified for the 1999 FIBA Under-19 World Championship

Rank	Team	Record
1st place, gold medalist(s)	China	7–1
2nd place, silver medalist(s)	Qatar	7–1
3rd place, bronze medalist(s)	Japan	6–2
4	Chinese Taipei	4–3
5	Iran	4–3
6	Kazakhstan	2–4
7	Philippines	3–4
8	Malaysia	2–5
9	South Korea	4–2
10	Hong Kong	3–3
11	India	4–3
12	Kuwait	2–4
13	Lebanon	3–4
14	Pakistan	0–6
15	Bangladesh	0–6

== Awards ==
1998 Asian Under-18 champions

China
Sixth title

- Most Valuable Player: (China) Yao Ming
- Best Playmaker: (Japan) Yuta Tabuse
- Best Scorer: (Japan) Fumio Murayama
- Best Coach: (China) Ma Lianbo
