= 2000 ABC Under-18 Championship =

2000 FIBA Under-18 Asia Cup
16th FIBA Under-18 Asian Basketball Championship

Tournament details
- Host country: Malaysia
- Dates: July 18–27
- Teams: 16
- Venue(s): 1 (in 1 host city)

Final positions
- Champions: South Korea (3rd title)

Tournament statistics
- MVP: (South Korea) Bang Sung-Yoon

The ABC Under-18 Championship 2000 is the 16th edition of the ABC's junior championship for basketball. The games were held at Kuala Lumpur, Malaysia from July 18–27, 2000.

== Preliminary round ==
=== Group A ===
Team	Pld	W	L	PF	PA	PD	Pts
China	3	3	0	279	113	+166	6
Kuwait	3	2	1	168	216	−48	5
Malaysia	3	1	2	226	212	+14	4
Sri Lanka	3	0	3	126	258	−132	3

July 18
21:00

Malaysia	74–76	Kuwait
Scoring by half: 20–32, 54–44

MABA Stadium, Kuala Lumpur

July 19
12:30

Kuwait	32–87	China
Scoring by half: 12–41, 20–46

MABA Stadium, Kuala Lumpur

July 19
19:00

Sri Lanka	47–95	Malaysia
Scoring by half: 24–52, 23–43

MABA Stadium, Kuala Lumpur

July 20
9:00

China	103–24	Sri Lanka
Scoring by half: 38–11, 65–13

MABA Stadium, Kuala Lumpur

July 21
9:00

Sri Lanka	55–60	Kuwait
Scoring by half: 29–36, 26–24

MABA Stadium, Kuala Lumpur

July 21
20:45

Malaysia	57–89	China
Scoring by half: 38–49, 19–40

MABA Stadium, Kuala Lumpur

=== Group B ===
Team	Pld	W	L	PF	PA	PD	Pts
Hong Kong	3	3	0	221	146	+75	6
Qatar	3	2	1	188	188	0	5
India	3	1	2	214	209	+5	4
Singapore	3	0	3	169	249	−80	3

July 18
9:00

Qatar	65–55	Singapore
Scoring by half: 38–24, 27–31

MABA Stadium, Kuala Lumpur

July 18
16:45

Hong Kong	72–46	India
Scoring by half: 32–19, 40–27

MABA Stadium, Kuala Lumpur

July 19
10:45

Singapore	45–77	Hong Kong
Scoring by half: 24–43, 21–34

MABA Stadium, Kuala Lumpur

July 20
12:30

India	107–69	Singapore
Scoring by half: 57–26, 50–43

MABA Stadium, Kuala Lumpur

July 20
19:00

Hong Kong	72–55	Qatar
Scoring by half: 34–27, 38–28

MABA Stadium, Kuala Lumpur

July 21
12:30

Qatar	68–61	India
Scoring by half: 40–26, 28–35

MABA Stadium, Kuala Lumpur

=== Group C ===
Team	Pld	W	L	PF	PA	PD	Pts
South Korea	3	3	0	274	190	+84	6
Japan	3	2	1	244	175	+69	5
Thailand	3	1	2	178	262	−84	4
Yemen	3	0	3	172	241	−69	3

July 18
10:45

Japan	87–42	Thailand
Scoring by half: 51–13, 36–29

MABA Stadium, Kuala Lumpur

July 19
9:00

Thailand	83–71	Yemen
Scoring by half: 32–34, 51–37

MABA Stadium, Kuala Lumpur

July 19
20:45

South Korea	87–82	Japan
Scoring by half: 47–38, 40–44

MABA Stadium, Kuala Lumpur

July 20
17:15

Yemen	55–83	South Korea
Scoring by half: 29–41, 26–42

MABA Stadium, Kuala Lumpur

July 21
10:45

South Korea	104–53	Thailand
Scoring by half: 54–28, 50–25

MABA Stadium, Kuala Lumpur

July 21
17:15

Japan	75–46	Yemen
Scoring by half: 44–22, 31–24

MABA Stadium, Kuala Lumpur

=== Group D ===
Team	Pld	W	L	PF	PA	PD	Pts
Chinese Taipei	3	3	0	257	220	+37	6
Saudi Arabia	3	2	1	204	173	+31	5
Iran	3	1	2	185	196	−11	4
Lebanon	3	0	3	168	225	−57	3

July 18
12:30

Chinese Taipei	74–69	Saudi Arabia
Scoring by half: 41–36, 33–33

MABA Stadium, Kuala Lumpur

July 18
18:30

Iran	56–47	Lebanon
Scoring by half: 25–27, 31–20

MABA Stadium, Kuala Lumpur

July 19
17:15

Lebanon	69–99	Chinese Taipei
Scoring by half: 40–54, 29–45

MABA Stadium, Kuala Lumpur

July 20
10:45

Saudi Arabia	70–52	Lebanon
Scoring by half: 34–23, 36–29

MABA Stadium, Kuala Lumpur

July 20
20:45

Chinese Taipei	84–82	Iran
Scoring by half: 37–39, 47–43

MABA Stadium, Kuala Lumpur

July 21
19:00

Iran	47–65	Saudi Arabia
Scoring by half: 13–26, 34–39

MABA Stadium, Kuala Lumpur

== Quarterfinal round ==
=== Group I ===
Team	Pld	W	L	PF	PA	PD	Pts
China	3	3	0	283	202	+81	6
South Korea	3	2	1	300	235	+65	5
Saudi Arabia	3	1	2	201	215	−14	4
Qatar	3	0	3	132	264	−132	3

July 22
17:15

China	98–43	Qatar
Scoring by half: 51–19, 47–24

MABA Stadium, Kuala Lumpur

July 22
19:00

South Korea	99–77	Saudi Arabia
Scoring by half: 52–40, 47–37

MABA Stadium, Kuala Lumpur

July 23
20:45

Qatar	51–98	South Korea
Scoring by half: 19–52, 32–46

MABA Stadium, Kuala Lumpur

July 24
17:15

Saudi Arabia	68–38	Qatar
Scoring by half: 35–15, 33–23

MABA Stadium, Kuala Lumpur

July 24
19:00

South Korea	103–107 (OT)	China
Scoring by half: 40–47, 53–46 Overtime: 10–14

MABA Stadium, Kuala Lumpur

July 25
20:45

China	78–56	Saudi Arabia
Scoring by half: 46–29, 32–27

MABA Stadium, Kuala Lumpur

=== Group II ===
Team	Pld	W	L	PF	PA	PD	Pts
Chinese Taipei	3	3	0	291	189	+102	6
Japan	3	2	1	232	187	+45	5
Hong Kong	3	1	2	173	248	−75	4
Kuwait	3	0	3	175	247	−72	3

July 22
20:45

Hong Kong	54–115	Chinese Taipei
Scoring by half: 37–56, 17–59

MABA Stadium, Kuala Lumpur

July 23
17:15

Chinese Taipei	98–62	Kuwait
Scoring by half: 40–25, 58–37

MABA Stadium, Kuala Lumpur

July 23
19:00

Japan	79–50	Hong Kong
Scoring by half: 38–21, 41–29

MABA Stadium, Kuala Lumpur

July 24
20:45

Kuwait	59–80	Japan
Scoring by half: 31–30, 28–50

MABA Stadium, Kuala Lumpur

July 25
17:15

Hong Kong	69–54	Kuwait
Scoring by half: 37–30, 32–24

MABA Stadium, Kuala Lumpur

July 25
19:00

Japan	73–78	Chinese Taipei
Scoring by half: 41–44, 32–34

MABA Stadium, Kuala Lumpur

=== Group III ===
Team	Pld	W	L	PF	PA	PD	Pts
Lebanon	3	3	0	254	187	+67	6
Malaysia	3	2	1	255	214	+41	5
Thailand	3	1	2	232	226	+6	4
Singapore	3	0	3	135	249	−114	3

July 22
9:00

Singapore	50–84	Thailand
Scoring by half: 31–42, 19–42

MABA Stadium, Kuala Lumpur

July 22
10:45

Malaysia	83–85	Lebanon
Scoring by half: 40–53, 43–32

MABA Stadium, Kuala Lumpur

July 23
12:30

Thailand	85–87	Malaysia
Scoring by half: 39–55, 46–32

MABA Stadium, Kuala Lumpur

July 24
9:00

Malaysia	85–44	Singapore
Scoring by half: 45–14, 40–30

MABA Stadium, Kuala Lumpur

July 24
10:45

Lebanon	89–63	Thailand
Scoring by half: 53–35, 36–28

MABA Stadium, Kuala Lumpur

July 25
12:30

Singapore	41–80	Lebanon
Scoring by half: 20–38, 21–42

MABA Stadium, Kuala Lumpur

=== Group IV ===
Team	Pld	W	L	PF	PA	PD	Pts
Iran	3	3	0	290	138	+152	6
India	3	2	1	194	214	−20	5
Yemen	3	1	2	169	199	−30	4
Sri Lanka	3	0	3	134	236	−102	3

July 22
12:30

Sri Lanka	48–76	India
Scoring by half: 27–26, 21–50

MABA Stadium, Kuala Lumpur

July 23
9:00

India	61–58	Yemen
Scoring by half: 28–26, 33–32

MABA Stadium, Kuala Lumpur

July 23
10:45

Iran	98–32	Sri Lanka
Scoring by half: 56–17, 42–15

MABA Stadium, Kuala Lumpur

July 24
12:30

Yemen	49–84	Iran
Scoring by half: 27–36, 22–48

MABA Stadium, Kuala Lumpur

July 25
9:00

Sri Lanka	54–62	Yemen
Scoring by half: 30–38, 24–24

MABA Stadium, Kuala Lumpur

July 25
10:45

Iran	108–57	India
Scoring by half: 49–32, 59–25

MABA Stadium, Kuala Lumpur

== Classification 5th–16th ==
=== 15th place ===
July 26
9:00

Singapore	62–77	Sri Lanka
Scoring by half: 30–45, 32–32

MABA Stadium, Kuala Lumpur

=== 13th place ===
July 26
10:45

Thailand	51–54	Yemen
Scoring by half: 25–29, 26–25

MABA Stadium, Kuala Lumpur

=== 11th place ===
July 26
12:30

Malaysia	101–58	India
Scoring by half: 59–15, 42–43

MABA Stadium, Kuala Lumpur

=== 9th place ===
July 26
17:15

Lebanon	69–77	Iran
Scoring by half: 37–38, 32–39

MABA Stadium, Kuala Lumpur

=== 7th place ===
July 27
9:00

Qatar	93–80	Kuwait
Scoring by half: 48–40, 45–40

MABA Stadium, Kuala Lumpur

=== 5th place ===
July 27
10:45

Saudi Arabia	64–59	Hong Kong
Scoring by half: 33–16, 31–43

MABA Stadium, Kuala Lumpur

== Final round ==
Semifinals
July 26
China	73
Japan	66
July 26
South Korea	100
Chinese Taipei	94

Final
July 27
China	92
South Korea	120
3rd place
July 27
Japan	76
Chinese Taipei	77

=== Semifinals ===
July 26
19:00

China	73–66	Japan
Scoring by half: 32–32, 41–34
Pts: Wang B. 18		Pts: Kazuya 14

MABA Stadium, Kuala Lumpur

July 26
20:45

South Korea	100–94	Chinese Taipei
Scoring by half: 47–35, 53–59
Pts: Bang S.Y. 32		Pts: Lin C.C. 23

MABA Stadium, Kuala Lumpur

=== 3rd place ===
July 27
18:30

Japan	76–77	Chinese Taipei
Scoring by half: 36–47, 40–30
Pts: Saito 22		Pts: Tien L. 16

MABA Stadium, Kuala Lumpur

=== Final ===
July 27
20:15

China	92–120	South Korea
Scoring by half: 54–60, 38–60
Pts: Li M., Wang B. 21		Pts: Bang S.Y. 23

MABA Stadium, Kuala Lumpur

== Final standing ==
Rank	Team	Record
1st place, gold medalist(s)	South Korea	7–1
2nd place, silver medalist(s)	China	7–1
3rd place, bronze medalist(s)	Chinese Taipei	7–1
4	Japan	4–4
5	Saudi Arabia	4–3
6	Hong Kong	4–3
7	Qatar	3–4
8	Kuwait	2–5
9	Iran	5–2
10	Lebanon	3–4
11	Malaysia	4–3
12	India	3–4
13	Yemen	2–5
14	Thailand	2–5
15	Sri Lanka	1–6
16	Singapore	0–7

== Awards ==
2000 Asian Under-18 champions

South Korea
Third title

- Most Valuable Player: (South Korea) Bang Sung-Yoon
- Best Playmaker: (Japan) Haruhito Shishito
