= Philippines men's national basketball team major competition results =

Philippines
- FIBA ranking: Gilas Pilipinas: 39 ▼3 Batang Gilas: 43 ▼8
- Joined FIBA: 1936
- FIBA zone: FIBA Asia
- National federation: Samahang Basketbol ng Pilipinas
- Coach: Tim Cone
- Nickname(s): S: Gilas Pilipinas, Gilas Cadets; J: Batang Gilas
Home	Away

The Philippines men's national basketball team (Filipino: Pambansang koponan ng basketbol ng Pilipinas) represents the Philippines in international basketball competitions. It is managed by the Samahang Basketbol ng Pilipinas (Basketball Federation of the Philippines or simply SBP). A 1936 founding member of FIBA Asia, Philippines is one of the oldest teams and has one of Asia's longest basketball traditions. The team won a bronze medal in the 1954 FIBA World Championship for men, the best finish by any team outside the Americas and Europe. Also, the team took a fifth-place finish in 1936 Summer Olympics, the best finish by any team outside the Americas, Europe and Oceania. The Philippines has the most wins in the Olympics among teams outside the Americas, Europe and Oceania.

Aside from the bronze medal at the FIBA World Cup and the fifth-place Olympic finish, the Philippines has won five FIBA Asia Cups (formerly FIBA Asia Championship), four Asian Games men's basketball gold medals, seven SEABA Championships, all but two Southeast Asian Games men's basketball gold medals, and has the most titles in Southeast Asia Basketball Association men's championship, being considered as the powerhouse team in Southeast Asia and one of Asia's elite basketball team. The country has also participated in seven FIBA World Cups and seven Olympic Basketball Tournaments.

Gilas Pilipinas and the Gilas Cadets represent the current men's national team while Batang Gilas Pilipinas Under-19 and Under-17 represent the current junior's national team.

== Gilas Pilipinas ==
=== FIBA Basketball World Cup ===
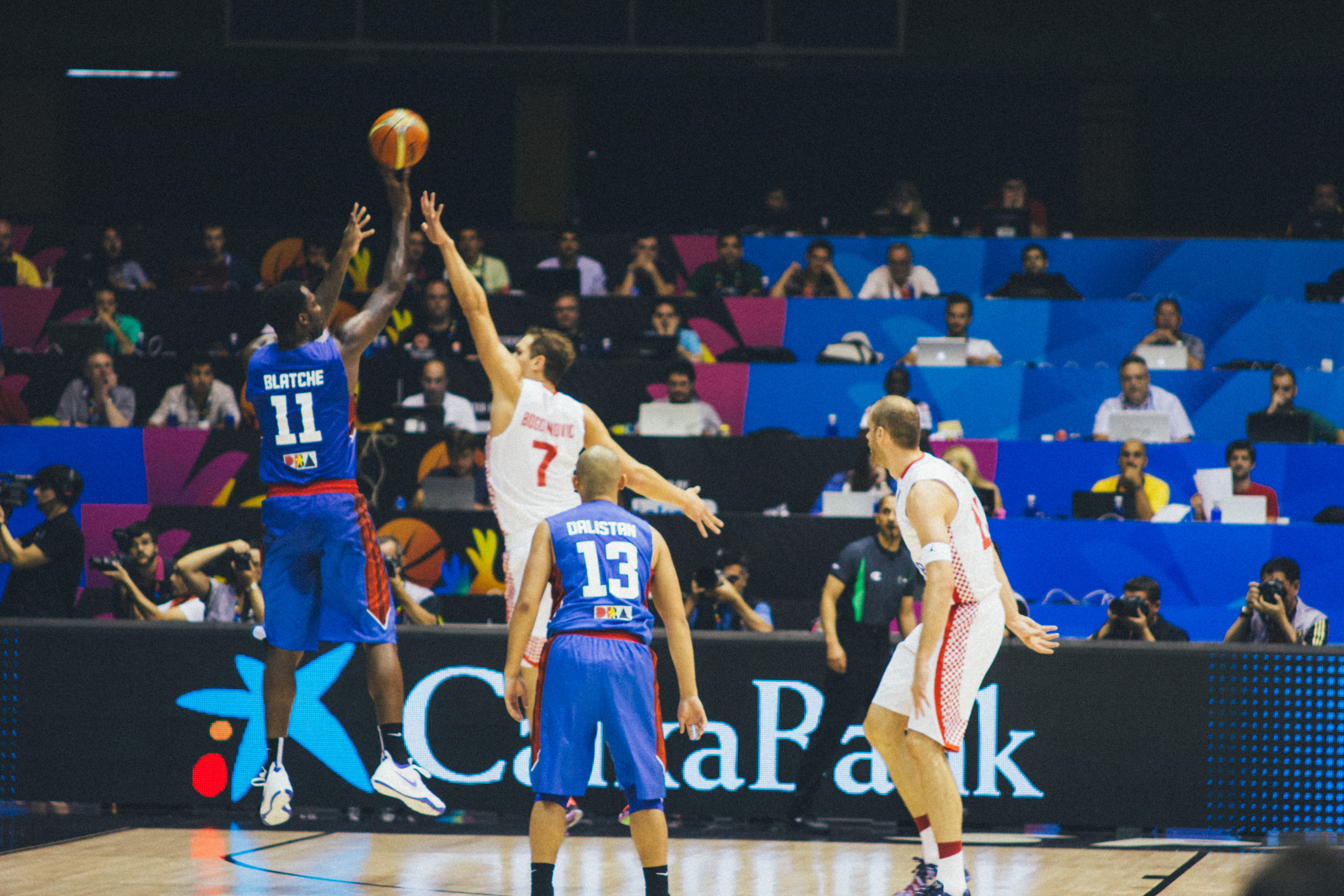
Philippines v. Croatia at the 2014 FIBA Basketball World Cup

FIBA World Cup Record					Qualification		
Year	Position	Pld	W	L	Pld	W	L
(Argentina) 1950	Did not participate						
(Brazil) 1954	3rd place	9	6	3			
(Chile) 1959	8th place	6	4	2			
(Brazil) 1963	Suspended						
(Uruguay) 1967	Did not qualify						
(Socialist Federal Republic of Yugoslavia) 1970	Did not qualify						
(Puerto Rico) 1974	13th place	7	2	5	See 1973 ABC Championship		
(Philippines) 1978	8th place	8	0	8	Qualified as hosts		
(Colombia) 1982	Did not qualify				See ABC/FIBA Asia Championship records		
(Spain) 1986	Withdrew				See ABC/FIBA Asia Championship records		
(Argentina) 1990	Did not qualify				See ABC/FIBA Asia Championship records		
(Canada) 1994	Did not qualify				See ABC/FIBA Asia Championship records		
(Greece) 1998	Did not qualify				See ABC/FIBA Asia Championship records		
(United States) 2002	Suspended				See ABC/FIBA Asia Championship records		
(Japan) 2006	Suspended				See ABC/FIBA Asia Championship records		
(Turkey) 2010	Did not qualify				See ABC/FIBA Asia Championship records		
(Spain) 2014	21st place	5	1	4	See ABC/FIBA Asia Championship records		
(China) 2019	32nd place	5	0	5	12	7	5
(Philippines) (Japan) (Indonesia) 2023	24th place	5	1	4	Qualified as co-hosts		
(Qatar) 2027	To be determined						
Total	1 bronze	45	14	31	12	7	5

==== By matches ====
Updated to matches played at the 2023 FIBA Basketball World Cup

List of FIBA Basketball World Cup matches
Year	Round	Opponent	Score	Result
1954	Round 1	Paraguay	64–52	Win
1954	Round 1	Brazil	62–99	Loss
1954	Final	United States	43–56	Loss
1954	Final	Formosa	48–38	Win
1954	Final	Israel	90–56	Win
1954	Final	Brazil	41–57	Loss
1954	Final	Canada	83–76	Win
1954	Final	France	66–60	Win
1954	Final	Uruguay	67–63	Win
1959	Round 1	Uruguay	68–59	Win
1959	Round 1	Bulgaria	61–85	Loss
1959	Round 1	Puerto Rico	63–76	Loss
1959	Classification	United Arab Republic	66–65	Win
1959	Classification	Canada	79–65	Win
1959	Classification	Uruguay	78–70	Win
1974	Round 1	United States	85–135	Loss
1974	Round 1	Argentina	90–111	Loss
1974	Round 1	Spain	85–117	Loss
1974	Classification	Australia	101–100	Win
1974	Classification	Mexico	84–101	Loss
1974	Classification	Czechoslovakia	112–119	Loss
1974	Classification	Central African Republic	87–86	Win
1978	Semifinal	Yugoslavia	101–117	Loss
1978	Semifinal	Soviet Union	63–110	Loss
1978	Semifinal	Brazil	72–119	Loss
1978	Semifinal	Italy	75–112	Loss
1978	Semifinal	Australia	52–97	Loss
1978	Semifinal	Canada	88–99	Loss
1978	Semifinal	United States	70–100	Loss
1978	Final	Australia	74–92	Loss
2014	Round 1	Croatia	78–81 OT	Loss
2014	Round 1	Greece	70–82	Loss
2014	Round 1	Argentina	81–85	Loss
2014	Round 1	Puerto Rico	73–77	Loss
2014	Round 1	Senegal	81–79 OT	Win
2019	Round 1	Italy	62–108	Loss
2019	Round 1	Serbia	67–126	Loss
2019	Round 1	Angola	81–84 OT	Loss
2019	Classification	Tunisia	67–86	Loss
2019	Classification	Iran	75–95	Loss
2023	Round 1	Dominican Republic	81–87	Loss
2023	Round 1	Angola	70–80	Loss
2023	Round 1	Italy	83–90	Loss
2023	Classification	South Sudan	67–86	Loss
2023	Classification	China	96–75	Win

==== Head to head record ====
Updated to matches played at the 2023 FIBA Basketball World Cup

Opponent	Played	Won	Lost
Angola	2	0	2
Argentina	2	0	2
Australia	3	1	2
Brazil	3	0	3
Bulgaria	1	0	1
Canada	3	2	1
Central African Republic	1	1	0
China	1	1	0
Chinese Taipei	1	1	0
Croatia	1	0	1
Czechoslovakia	1	0	1
Dominican Republic	1	0	1
Egypt	1	1	0
France	1	1	0
Greece	1	0	1
Iran	1	0	1
Israel	1	1	0
Italy	3	0	3
Mexico	1	0	1
Paraguay	1	1	0
Puerto Rico	2	0	2
Senegal	1	1	0
Serbia	1	0	1
South Sudan	1	0	1
Soviet Union	1	0	1
Spain	1	0	1
Tunisia	1	0	1
United States	3	0	3
Uruguay	3	3	0
Yugoslavia	1	0	1
Total	45	14	31

=== Olympic Games ===
Summer Olympic Games Record
Year	Position	Pld	W	L
(Germany) 1936	5th place	5	4	1
(United Kingdom) 1948	12th place	8	4	4
(Finland) 1952	9-16th place	5	3	2
(Australia) 1956	7th place	8	4	4
(Italy) 1960	11th place	8	4	4
(Japan) 1964	Did not qualify			
(Mexico) 1968	13th place	9	3	6
(Germany) 1972	13th place	9	3	6
(Canada) 1976	Did not qualify			
(Soviet Union) 1980	Did not participate			
(United States) 1984 to (France) 2024	Did not qualify			
Total		52	25	27

==== FIBA World Olympic qualifying tournament ====
FIBA World Olympic Qualifying Tournament
Year	Position	Pld	W	L
(Italy) 1960	Automatic Olympic qualifier			
(Japan) 1964	6th place	9	4	5
(Mexico) 1968 to (Germany) 1972	Automatic Olympic qualifier			
(Canada) 1976 to (Venezuela) 2012	Did not qualify			
(Philippines) 2016	6th place	2	0	2
(Serbia) 2020	5th place	2	0	2
(Latvia) 2024	3rd place	3	1	2
Total		16	5	11

=== FIBA Asia Cup ===
FIBA Asia Cup Record						Qualification		
Year	Position	Pld	W	L		Pld	W	L
(Philippines) 1960	Champions	9	9	0		Qualified as hosts		
(Taiwan) 1963	Champions	11	9	2				
(Malaysia) 1965	Runners-up	9	8	1				
(South Korea) 1967	Champions	9	9	0				
(Thailand) 1969	3rd place	8	6	2				
(Japan) 1971	Runners-up	8	7	1				
(Philippines) 1973	Champions	10	10	0		Qualified as hosts		
(Thailand) 1975	5th place	9	5	4				
(Malaysia) 1977	5th place	9	4	5				
(Japan) 1979	4th place	7	4	3				
(India) 1981	4th place	7	4	3				
(Hong Kong) 1983	9th place	5	3	2				
(Malaysia) 1985	Champions	6	6	0				
(Thailand) 1987	4th place	7	4	3				
(China) 1989	8th place	7	2	5				
(Japan) 1991	7th place	9	5	4				
(Indonesia) 1993	11th place	6	3	3				
(South Korea) 1995	12th place	7	2	5				
(Saudi Arabia) 1997	9th place	6	3	3				
(Japan) 1999	11th place	6	2	4				
(China) 2001	Suspended							
(China) 2003	15th place	7	2	5				
(Qatar) 2005	Suspended							
(Japan) 2007	9th place	7	5	2				
(China) 2009	8th place	9	4	5				
(China) 2011	4th place	9	6	3				
(Philippines) 2013	Runners-up	9	7	2		Qualified as hosts		
(China) 2015	Runners-up	9	7	2		See 2015 SEABA Championship		
(Lebanon) 2017	7th place	6	4	2		See 2017 SEABA Championship		
(Indonesia) 2022	9th place	4	1	3		6	6	0
(Saudi Arabia) 2025	7th place	5	2	3		6	4	2
Total	29/31	220	143	77	12	10	2	

=== FIBA Asia Challenge ===
FIBA Asia Challenge Record
Year	Position	Pld	W	L
(Taiwan) 2004	8th place	5	0	5
(Kuwait) 2008	Did not participate			
(Lebanon) 2010	4th place	7	3	4
(Japan) 2012	4th place	7	4	3
(China) 2014	3rd place	6	5	1
(Iran) 2016	9th place	5	1	4
Total	1 bronze	30	13	17

=== Asian Games ===
Asian Games Record
Year	Position	Pld	W	L
(India) 1951	1st place	4	4	0
(Philippines) 1954	1st place	6	6	0
(Japan) 1958	1st place	7	6	1
(Indonesia) 1962	1st place	7	7	0
(Thailand) 1966	6th place	7	4	3
(Thailand) 1970	5th place	8	4	4
(Iran) 1974	4th place	6	2	4
(Thailand) 1978	5th place	9	4	5
(India) 1982	4th place	10	6	4
(South Korea) 1986	3rd place	4	2	2
(China) 1990	2nd place	6	4	2
(Japan) 1994	4th place	6	3	3
(Thailand) 1998	3rd place	7	4	3
(South Korea) 2002	4th place	7	4	3
(Qatar) 2006	Suspended			
(China) 2010	6th place	9	5	4
(South Korea) 2014	7th place	7	3	4
(Indonesia) 2018	5th place	5	3	2
(China) 2022	1st place	7	6	1
(Japan) 2026	9th place	3	1	2
Total	5 golds 1 silver 2 bronzes	125	78	47

=== SEABA Championship ===
SEABA Championship Record
Year	Position	Pld	W	L
(Malaysia) 1994	4th place			
(Indonesia) 1996	2nd place			
(Philippines) 1998	1st place	5	5	0
(Philippines) 2001	1st place	5	5	0
(Malaysia) 2003	1st place	3	3	0
(Malaysia) 2005	Suspended			
(Thailand) 2007	1st place	4	4	0
(Indonesia) 2009	1st place	4	4	0
(Indonesia) 2011	1st place	4	4	0
(Indonesia) 2013	Did not participate			
(Singapore) 2015	1st place	5	5	0
(Philippines) 2017	1st place	6	6	0
Total	8 golds 1 silver			

=== SEABA Cup ===
SEABA Cup
Year	Position	Pld	W	L
(Thailand) 2012	1st place	4	4	0
(Indonesia) 2014	Did not participate			
(Thailand) 2016	1st place	5	5	0
Total	2 golds	9	9	0

=== SEA Games ===
SEA Games record
Year	Position	Pld	W	L
(Malaysia) 1977	1st place	–	–	–
(Indonesia) 1979	2nd place	–	–	–
(Philippines) 1981	1st place	4	3	1
(Singapore) 1983	1st place	–	–	–
(Thailand) 1985	1st place	–	–	–
(Indonesia) 1987	1st place	5	5	0
(Malaysia) 1989	2nd place	4	3	1
(Philippines) 1991	1st place	5	5	0
(Singapore) 1993	1st place	–	–	–
(Thailand) 1995	1st place	7	7	0
(Indonesia) 1997	1st place	4	3	1
(Brunei) 1999	1st place	–	–	–
(Malaysia) 2001	1st place	5	5	0
(Vietnam) 2003	1st place	5	5	0
(Philippines) 2005	Suspended			
(Thailand) 2007	1st place	4	4	0
(Laos) 2009	Not held			
(Indonesia) 2011	1st place	5	5	0
(Myanmar) 2013	1st place	6	6	0
(Singapore) 2015	1st place	5	5	0
(Malaysia) 2017	1st place	5	5	0
(Philippines) 2019	1st place	5	5	0
(Vietnam) 2021	2nd place	6	5	1
(Cambodia) 2023	1st place	5	4	1
(Thailand) 2025	1st place	4	4	0
Total	20 golds, 3 silvers	84	79	5

== Batang Gilas U-19 ==
=== FIBA U-19 World ===
FIBA Under-19 World Cup Record
Year	Position	Pld	W	L
(Brazil) 1979	10th place	8	2	6
(Spain) 1983 to (Egypt) 2017	Did not qualify			
(Greece) 2019	14th place	7	1	6
(Latvia) 2021 to (Switzerland) 2025	Did not qualify			
Total		15	3	12

=== FIBA U-18 Asian ===
FIBA Under-18 Asian Championship Record
Year	Position	Pld	W	L
(South Korea) 1970	1st place	6	6	0
(Philippines) 1972	1st place	9	9	0
(Philippines) 1974	1st place	10	10	0
(Kuwait) 1977	1st place			
(Philippines) 1978	1st place			
(Thailand) 1980	2nd place	9	8	1
(Philippines) 1982	1st place	10	10	0
(South Korea) 1984	3rd place	8	5	3
(Philippines) 1986	2nd place			
(Philippines) 1989	3rd place	8	6	2
(Japan) 1990	4th place			
(China) 1992	3rd place	7	5	2
(Philippines) 1995	6th place	7	4	3
(Malaysia) 1996	6th place	7	4	3
(India) 1998	7th place	7	3	4
(Malaysia) 2000	Did not participate			
(Kuwait) 2002	Did not participate			
(India) 2004	13th place	7	3	4
(China) 2006	Did not participate			
(Iran) 2008	7th place	8	4	4
(Yemen) 2010	5th place	9	6	3
(Mongolia) 2012	6th place	9	6	3
(Qatar) 2014	5th place	8	5	3
(Iran) 2016	7th place	8	3	5
(Thailand) 2018	4th place	6	4	2
(Iran) 2022	6th place	6	4	2
(Jordan) 2024	10th place	4	1	3
(India) 2026	Qualified			
Total	6 golds 2 silvers 3 bronzes			

=== SEABA U-18 ===
SEABA Under-18 Championship Record
Year	Position	Pld	W	L
(Philippines) 1996	1st place			
(Thailand) 1998	1st place			
(Malaysia) 2002	Did not participate			
(Philippines) 2004	1st place	4	4	0
(Malaysia) 2006	Did not participate			
(Malaysia) 2008	1st place			
(Myanmar) 2010	1st place			
(Singapore) 2012	1st place	4	4	0
(Malaysia) 2014	1st place	3	3	0
(Indonesia) 2016	1st place	6	6	0
(Malaysia) 2024	1st place	3	3	0
(Thailand) 2026	1st place	5	5	0
Total	9 golds			

== Batang Gilas U-17 ==
=== FIBA U-17 World ===
FIBA Under-17 World Cup Record
Year	Position	Pld	W	L
(Germany) 2010	Did not qualify			
(Lithuania) 2012	Did not qualify			
(United Arab Emirates) 2014	15th place	7	1	6
(Spain) 2016	Did not qualify			
(Argentina) 2018	13th place	7	2	5
(Bulgaria) 2020	Cancelled			
(Spain) 2022	Did not qualify			
(Turkey) 2024	16th place	7	0	7
(Turkey) 2026	Did not qualify			
Total		21	3	18

=== FIBA U-16 Asian ===
FIBA Under-16 Asian Championship Record
Year	Position	Pld	W	L
(Malaysia) 2009	4th place	8	5	3
(Vietnam) 2011	4th place	8	6	2
(Iran) 2013	2nd place	9	7	2
(Indonesia) 2015	5th place	8	6	2
(China) 2017	4th place	6	3	3
(Lebanon) 2019	Cancelled			
(Qatar) 2022	7th place	6	3	3
(Qatar) 2023	4th place	7	4	3
(Mongolia) 2025	10th place	4	1	3
Total	1 silver	56	35	21

=== SEABA U-16 ===
SEABA Under-16 Championship Record
Year	Position	Pld	W	L
(Malaysia) 2011	1st place	4	4	0
(Indonesia) 2013	1st place	4	4	0
(Philippines) 2015	1st place	4	4	0
(Philippines) 2017	1st place	4	4	0
(Indonesia) 2023	1st place	3	3	0
(Philippines) 2025	1st place	5	5	0
Total	6 golds	24	24	0

== 3x3 Senior ==
=== Olympic Games ===
Summer Olympic Games Record
Year	Position	Pld	W	L
(Japan) 2020	Did not qualify			
(France) 2024	Did not qualify			
Total				

=== FIBA 3x3 Olympic Qualifying Tournament ===
FIBA 3x3 Olympic Qualifying Tournament
Year	Position	Pld	W	L
(Austria) 2021	20th place	4	0	4
(Hungary) 2024	Did not qualify			
Total		4	0	4

=== FIBA 3x3 World Cup ===
FIBA 3x3 World Cup Record
Year	Position	Pld	W	L
(Greece) 2012 to (Russia) 2014	Did not qualify			
(China) 2016	9th place	4	2	2
(France) 2017	11th place	4	2	2
(Philippines) 2018	11th place	4	2	2
(Netherlands) 2019 to (Mongolia) 2025	Did not qualify			
Total		12	6	6

=== FIBA 3x3 Asia Cup ===
FIBA 3x3 Asia Cup Record
Year	Position	Pld	W	L
(Qatar) 2013	7th place	4	2	2
(Mongolia) 2017 to (China) 2018	Did not enter			
(China) 2019	Did not qualify			
(Singapore) 2022	4th place	5	2	3
(Singapore) 2023	10th place	2	0	2
(Singapore) 2024	11th place	2	0	2
(Singapore) 2025	15th place	3	2	1
(Singapore) 2026	6th place	5	3	2
Total		21	9	12

=== Asian Games ===
Asian Games Record
Year	Position	Pld	W	L
(Indonesia) 2018	Did not enter			
(China) 2022	8th place	6	4	2
(Japan) 2026	4th place	6	4	2
Total		12	8	4

=== Asian Beach Games ===
Asian Beach Games record
Year	Position	Pld	W	L
(Indonesia) 2008	2nd place	5	4	1
(China) 2012 to (Vietnam) 2016	Did not enter			
(China) 2026	6th place	6	3	3
Total	1 silver	11	7	4

=== Asian Indoor Games ===
Asian Indoor Games 3x3 Record
Year	Position	Pld	W	L
(Macau) 2007	4th place	4	2	2
(Vietnam) 2009 to (Turkmenistan) 2017	Did not enter			
Total		4	2	2

=== SEA Games ===
SEA Games 3x3 record
Year	Position	Pld	W	L
(Philippines) 2019	1st place	8	8	0
(Vietnam) 2021	3rd place	8	5	3
(Cambodia) 2023	2nd place	5	4	1
(Thailand) 2025	4th place	5	3	2
Total	1 gold 1 silver 1 bronze	26	20	6

== 3x3 Junior ==
=== FIBA 3x3 U-23 World ===
FIBA 3x3 Under-23 World Cup Record
Year	Position	Pld	W	L
(China) 2018	9th place	4	2	2
(China) 2019	Did not qualify			
(China) 2020	Cancelled			
(Romania) 2022 to (China) 2025	Did not qualify			
(China) 2026	18th place	4	0	4
Total		8	2	6

=== FIBA 3x3 U-18 World ===
FIBA 3x3 Under-18 World Cup Record
Year	Position	Pld	W	L
(Greece) 2011 to (Spain) 2012	Did not qualify			
(Indonesia) 2013	18th place	7	3	4
(Hungary) 2015	17th place	5	2	3
(Kazakhstan) 2016	17th place	4	1	3
(China) 2017	7th place	5	3	2
(Mongolia) 2019 to (Mongolia) 2025	Did not qualify			
Total		21	9	12

=== Youth Olympics ===
Youth Olympic Games Record
Year	Position	Pld	W	L
(Singapore) 2010	9th place	7	4	3
(China) 2014 to (Argentina) 2018	Did not qualify			
Total		7	4	3

=== FIBA 3x3 U-18 Asian ===
FIBA 3x3 Under-18 Asian Championship Record
Year	Position	Pld	W	L
(Thailand) 2013	1st place	7	6	1
(Malaysia) 2016	2nd place	7	5	2
(Malaysia) 2017	7th place	3	1	2
(Malaysia) 2018	Did not participate			
(Malaysia) 2019	5th place	3	2	1
(Malaysia) 2022	Did not participate			
Total	1 gold 1 silver	20	14	6

== See also ==
- Philippines men's national basketball team in FIBA club tournaments
