= Philippines men's national under-19 basketball team =

Men's national under-19 basketball team of the Philippines

Philippines
- FIBA ranking: 43 ▼8 (December 13, 2025)
- Joined FIBA: 1936
- FIBA zone: FIBA Asia
- National federation: SBP
- Coach: Juno Sauler
- Nickname: Gilas Pilipinas Youth

U19 World Cup
- Appearances: 2
- Medals: None

U18 Asia Cup
- Appearances: 25 (First in 1970)
- Medals: Gold: 6 (1970, 1972, 1974, 1977, 1978, 1982); Silver: 2 (1980, 1986); Bronze: 3 (1984, 1989, 1992)
Home	Away

The Philippines men's national under-18 and under-19 basketball team represents the country in junior men's under-18 and under-19 FIBA tournaments and is governed by the Samahang Basketbol ng Pilipinas.

The team has won 6 FIBA U18 Asia Cups making them second with the most wins in the tournament next to China.

The team is also the perennial powerhouse at Southeast Asia, representing the subzone in the FIBA Asia Under-18 Championship, except in 2000, 2002 and 2006. Since 2008, they have not lost any single game at the SEABA Under-18 Championship, winning their seventh straight title and tenth overall since the subzone organized the tournament in 1996.

== Competitions ==
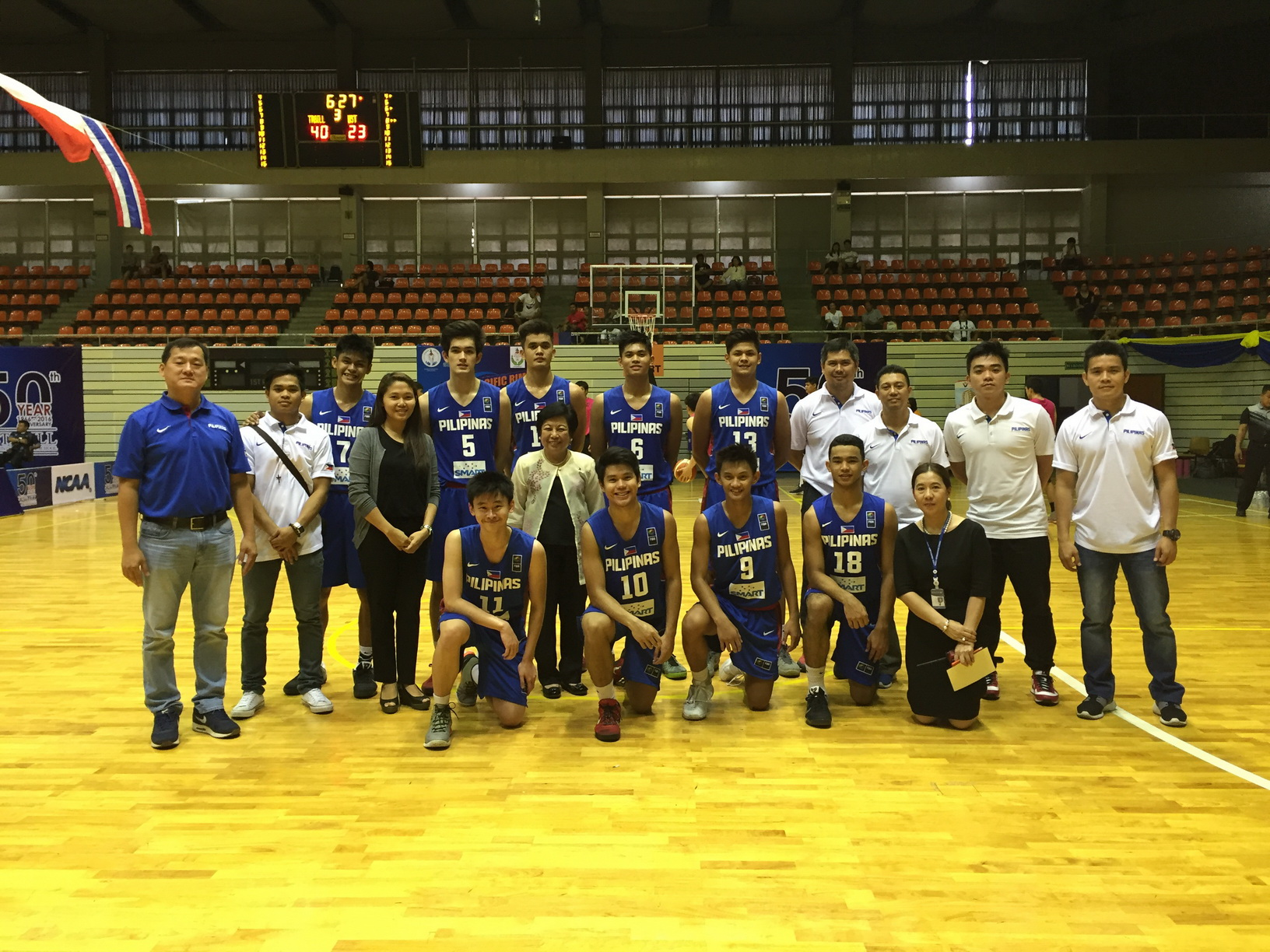
Members of the youth national team in 2016 along with officials.

=== FIBA U19 World Cup ===
FIBA Under-19 World Cup record
Year	Position	Pld	W	L
(Brazil) 1979	10th place	8	2	6
(Spain) 1983 to (Egypt) 2017	Did not qualify			
(Greece) 2019	14th place	7	1	6
(Latvia) 2021 to (Czech Republic) 2027	Did not qualify			
(Indonesia) 2029	To be determined			
Total	2/19	15	3	12

=== FIBA U18 Asia Cup ===
FIBA Under-18 Asia Cup record
Year	Position	Pld	W	L
(South Korea) 1970	1st place	6	6	0
(Philippines) 1972	1st place	9	9	0
(Philippines) 1974	1st place	10	10	0
(Kuwait) 1977	1st place			
(Philippines) 1978	1st place	6	6	0
(Thailand) 1980	2nd place	9	8	1
(Philippines) 1982	1st place	10	10	0
(South Korea) 1984	3rd place	8	5	3
(Philippines) 1986	2nd place			
(Philippines) 1989	3rd place	8	6	2
(Japan) 1990	4th place			
(China) 1992	3rd place			
(Philippines) 1995	6th place	7	4	3
(Malaysia) 1996	6th place	7	4	3
(India) 1998	7th place	7	3	4
(Malaysia) 2000	Did not qualify			
(Kuwait) 2002	Did not qualify			
(India) 2004	13th place	7	3	4
(China) 2006	Suspended			
(Iran) 2008	7th place	8	4	4
(Yemen) 2010	5th place	9	6	3
(Mongolia) 2012	6th place	9	6	3
(Qatar) 2014	5th place	8	5	3
(Iran) 2016	7th place	8	3	5
(Thailand) 2018	4th place	6	4	2
(Iran) 2022	6th place	6	4	2
(Jordan) 2024	10th place	4	1	3
(India) 2026	8th place	7	3	4
Total	6 golds 2 silvers 3 bronzes			

=== SEABA U18 Championship ===
SEABA Under-18 Championship Record
Year	Position	Pld	W	L
(Philippines) 1996	1st place	3	3	0
(Thailand) 1998	1st place	3	3	0
(Malaysia) 2002	4th place	4	1	3
(Philippines) 2004	1st place	4	4	0
(Malaysia) 2006	Suspended			
(Malaysia) 2008	1st place	4	4	0
(Myanmar) 2010	1st place	5	5	0
(Singapore) 2012	1st place	4	4	0
(Malaysia) 2014	1st place	3	3	0
(Indonesia) 2016	1st place	6	6	0
(Malaysia) 2024	1st place	3	3	0
(Thailand) 2026	1st place	5	5	0
Total	10 golds	44	41	3

== Current roster ==
Philippines roster at the 28th FIBA U18 Asian Championship:

Philippines Under-18 National Basketball Team - 2026 FIBA U18 Asian Championship roster
Players
Coaches

Pos.	No.	Name	Age – Date of birth	Height	Club
G	1	Sizco Roquid	18 – March 30, 2008	6 ft 3 in (1.91 m)	University of Perpetual Help System DALTA
SF	2	Ethan Matthew Aguas	18 – February 17, 2008	6 ft 5 in (1.96 m)	University of the East
F	3	Patrick Laurence Pasinos	17 – November 9, 2008	6 ft 6 in (1.98 m)	Far Eastern University Diliman
G	6	Luke Edward Atacador	17 – September 27, 2008	6 ft 2 in (1.88 m)	Knox Raiders
C	8	Jacob Steven Lacson	18 – March 14, 2008	6 ft 8 in (2.03 m)	Sacred Heart School – Ateneo de Cebu
SF	9	Lino Jr. Tubongbanua	17 – March 18, 2009	6 ft 3 in (1.91 m)	University of the Philippines
SF	10	George Aidan Green	18 – February 16, 2008	6 ft 6 in (1.98 m)	Spire Academy
SG	23	Elias Troy Gish	18 – January 18, 2008	6 ft 7 in (2.01 m)	Clovis North High School
SG	24	Jan Bennett Cagurungan	17 – August 17, 2008	6 ft 4 in (1.93 m)	Far Eastern University Diliman
PF	26	Prince Cariño	16 – August 15, 2009	6 ft 7 in (2.01 m)	Far Eastern University Diliman
PG	71	Kenji Yob Moral	18 – June 26, 2008	6 ft 2 in (1.88 m)	St. Augustine Institute of Pampanga
SG	77	Andrew Xavier Chio	18 – April 25, 2008	6 ft 3 in (1.91 m)	Xavier School

Head coach

- (Philippines) Marco Januz Sauler

Assistant coach(es)

- (Philippines) Roland Rey Santos

Legend

- (c) Team captain
- Age field is age on August 13, 2026

== Past rosters ==
=== 2026 FIBA U18 Asia Cup SEABA Qualifiers ===
Philippines roster at the 12th FIBA U18 Asia Cup SEABA Qualifiers:

Philippines Under-19 National Basketball Team - 2026 SEABA Under-18 Championship Champions roster
Players
Coaches

Pos.	No.	Name	Age – Date of birth	Height	Club
SF	2	Ethan Matthew Aguas	18 – February 17, 2008	6 ft 5 in (1.96 m)	University of the East
F	3	Patrick Laurence Pasinos	17 – November 9, 2008	6 ft 4 in (1.93 m)	Far Eastern University Diliman
PG	5	Hans Patagoc	17 – September 8, 2008	6 ft 0 in (1.83 m)	Obra D. Tompkins High School
SG	7	Louis James Razon	18 – January 9, 2008	6 ft 0 in (1.83 m)	King’s Christian College
SF	9	Lino Jr. Tubongbanua	17 – March 18, 2009	6 ft 1 in (1.85 m)	University of the Philippines
PG	11	Joaquin Mikhail Tovera	17 – July 11, 2008	6 ft 1 in (1.85 m)	Chino Hills High School
SG	21	Kyle Niño Sardon	18 – January 21, 2008	5 ft 10 in (1.78 m)	St. Robert's International College
SG	24	Jan Bennett Cagurungan	17 – August 17, 2008	6 ft 1 in (1.85 m)	Far Eastern University Diliman
F	25	Ziv Gabriel Espinas	18 – May 8, 2008	6 ft 2 in (1.88 m)	Ateneo de Manila University
PF	26	Prince Cariño	16 – August 15, 2009	6 ft 6 in (1.98 m)	Far Eastern University Diliman
PG	71	Kenji Yob Moral	17 – June 26, 2008	5 ft 11 in (1.8 m)	St. Augustine Institute of Pampanga
SG	77	Andrew Xavier Chio	18 – April 25, 2008	6 ft 1 in (1.85 m)	Xavier School

Head coach

- (Philippines) Marco Januz Sauler

Assistant coach(es)

- (Philippines) Roland Rey Santos

Legend

- (c) Team captain
- Age field is age on June 10, 2026

=== 2024 FIBA U18 Asia Cup ===
Philippines roster at the 27th FIBA U18 Asian Championship:

Philippines Under-18 National Basketball Team - 2024 FIBA U18 Asian Championship roster
Players
Coaches

Pos.	No.	Name	Age – Date of birth	Height	Club
PG	1	Kurt Nathan Velasquez	17 – February 21, 2007	5 ft 10 in (1.78 m)	University of Santo Tomas
PG	2	Mark Airick Esperanza	17 – December 13, 2006	5 ft 11 in (1.8 m)	Adamson University
PG	4	Joaquin Gabriel Ludovice	17 – January 1, 2007	5 ft 9 in (1.75 m)	University of Santo Tomas
SF	5	Wilhalm Lawrence Cabonilas	18 – June 5, 2006	6 ft 5 in (1.96 m)	Far Eastern University Diliman
PF	8	Johnkurl Figueroa	17 – September 8, 2006	6 ft 4 in (1.93 m)	National University
SF	11	Carl Vincent Manding	18 – March 11, 2006	6 ft 2 in (1.88 m)	University of Santo Tomas
SG	13	Jericho Riley Santos	17 – November 13, 2006	6 ft 2 in (1.88 m)	Chaminade College Preparatory School
C	14	Louis Allen Perez	18 – June 13, 2006	6 ft 7 in (2.01 m)	Adamson University
C	17	Nicholash Drei Lorenzo	17 – October 31, 2006	6 ft 5 in (1.96 m)	San Beda University
SG	21	John Earl Medina	18 – February 21, 2006	6 ft 2 in (1.88 m)	Adamson University
PF	25	Marc Daniel Burgos	17 – November 6, 2006	6 ft 5 in (1.96 m)	Far Eastern University Diliman
SF	30	Charles Francis Esteban	18 – August 4, 2006	6 ft 4 in (1.93 m)	University of Santo Tomas

Head coach

- (Philippines) Joshua Vincent Reyes

Assistant coach(es)

- (Philippines) Allan Reynaldo Albano

Legend

- (c) Team captain
- Age field is age on September 2, 2024

=== 2024 FIBA U18 Asia Cup SEABA Qualifiers ===
Philippines Under-18 National Basketball Team - 2024 SEABA Under-18 Championship Champions roster
Players
Coaches

Pos.	No.	Name	Age – Date of birth	Height	Club
PG	2	Mark Airick Esperanza	17 – December 13, 2006	5 ft 11 in (1.8 m)	Adamson University
SF	3	Carl Vincent Manding	18 – March 11, 2006	6 ft 2 in (1.88 m)	University of Santo Tomas
PG	4	Joaquin Gabriel Ludovice	17 – January 1, 2007	5 ft 9 in (1.75 m)	University of Santo Tomas
SF	5	Wilhalm Lawrence Cabonilas	18 – June 5, 2006	6 ft 5 in (1.96 m)	Far Eastern University Diliman
SG	6	Jericho Riley Santos	17 – November 13, 2006	6 ft 2 in (1.88 m)	Chaminade College Preparatory School
PG	7	Andy Gemao	18 – June 26, 2006	6 ft 0 in (1.83 m)	Royal Crown School
C	17	Nicholash Drei Lorenzo	17 – October 31, 2006	6 ft 5 in (1.96 m)	San Beda University
SG	21	John Earl Medina	18 – February 21, 2006	6 ft 2 in (1.88 m)	Adamson University
PF	25	Marc Daniel Burgos	17 – November 6, 2006	6 ft 5 in (1.96 m)	Far Eastern University Diliman
C	28	Stephen Hans Castillejos	18 – May 6, 2006	6 ft 7 in (2.01 m)	Far Eastern University
SF	30	Charles Francis Esteban	17 – August 4, 2006	6 ft 4 in (1.93 m)	University of Santo Tomas

Head coach

- (Philippines) Joshua Vincent Reyes

Assistant coach(es)

- (Philippines) Allan Reynaldo Albano

Legend

- (c) Team captain
- Age field is age on July 19, 2024

=== 2022 FIBA Under-18 Asia Cup ===
Philippines roster at the 26th FIBA U18 Asian Championship:

Philippines Under-18 National Basketball Team - 2022 FIBA U18 Asian Championship roster
Players
Coaches

Pos.	No.	Name	Age – Date of birth	Height	Club
PF	0	Kristian Michael Porter	17 – July 8, 2005	6 ft 5 in (1.96 m)	Ateneo de Manila University
PG	1	Prince Ray Alao	18 – January 19, 2004	6 ft 1 in (1.85 m)	De La Salle University
SF	2	Kyle Daven Gamber	17 – December 21, 2004	6 ft 3 in (1.91 m)	Polytech High School
C	5	Manuel Antonio Luis Pablo	18 – June 5, 2004	6 ft 7 in (2.01 m)	La Salle Green Hills
C	7	Seven Gavate	18 – May 24, 2004	6 ft 8 in (2.03 m)	La Salle Green Hills
C	8	Henjz Gabriel Demisana	17 – November 8, 2004	6 ft 8 in (2.03 m)	University of the Philippines Integrated School
PG	9	Jared Bahay	17 – April 9, 2005	5 ft 9 in (1.75 m)	Ateneo de Cebu
SG	11	James Phillip Nacua	17 – December 11, 2004	6 ft 4 in (1.93 m)	San Beda University
SG	19	Earl Jared Abadam	18 – February 23, 2004	6 ft 5 in (1.96 m)	De La Salle University
C	21	Mason Amos	18 – August 21, 2004	6 ft 7 in (2.01 m)	Brisbane State High School
SG	34	Joshua Caleb Coronel	18 – March 24, 2004	6 ft 4 in (1.93 m)	La Salle Green Hills
SF	77	L. A. John Andres	18 – August 7, 2004	6 ft 5 in (1.96 m)	De La Salle University

Head coach

- (Philippines) Joshua Vincent Reyes

Assistant coach(es)

- (Philippines) Gilbert Lao
- (Philippines) JB Sison

Legend

- (c) Team captain
- Age field is age on August 21, 2022

=== 2019 FIBA Under-19 Basketball World Cup ===
Philippines roster at the 14th FIBA Under-19 Basketball World Cup:

Philippines Under-19 National Basketball Team - 2019 FIBA Under-19 Basketball World Cup - 14th place roster
Players
Coaches

Pos.	No.	Name	Age – Date of birth	Height	Club
PG	1	Gerry Austin Abadiano	18 – March 8, 2001	6 ft 3 in (1.91 m)	National University (Philippines)
SG	4	Miguel Oczon	19 – March 29, 2000	6 ft 0 in (1.83 m)	National University (Philippines)
PG	5	Dalph Panopio	19 – June 10, 2000	6 ft 3 in (1.91 m)	A.S. Stella Azzurra
G	6	Terrence Fortea	17 – July 3, 2001	6 ft 3 in (1.91 m)	National University (Philippines)
PF	7	Kevin Quiambao	16 – September 23, 2002	6 ft 6 in (1.98 m)	National University (Philippines)
G	10	Dave Ildefonso	19 – April 14, 2000	6 ft 7 in (2.01 m)	Ateneo de Manila University
F	12	James Daniel Spencer	19 – March 22, 2000	6 ft 6 in (1.98 m)	University of the Philippines
G/F	13	Rhayyan Amsali	18 – December 28, 2000	6 ft 6 in (1.98 m)	San Beda University
F/C	14	A. J. Edu	19 – January 1, 2000	6 ft 10 in (2.08 m)	University of Toledo
F	15	Carl Tamayo	18 – February 13, 2001	6 ft 7 in (2.01 m)	National University (Philippines)
C	16	Geo Chiu	18 – May 18, 2001	6 ft 10 in (2.08 m)	Ateneo de Manila University
C	15	Kai Sotto	17 – May 11, 2002	7 ft 2 in (2.18 m)	The Skills Factory

Head coach

- (Philippines) Sandy Arespacochaga

Assistant coach(es)

- (Philippines) Anton Altamirano
- (Philippines) Ryan Betia
- (Philippines) JB Sison
- (Philippines) Charles Tiu

Legend

- (c) Team captain
- Age field is age on June 29, 2019

=== 2018 FIBA Under-18 Asian Championship ===
Philippines roster at the 25th FIBA Under-18 Asian Championship:

Philippines Under-18 National Basketball Team - 2018 FIBA Under-18 Asian Championship - 4th place roster
Players
Coaches

Pos.	No.	Name	Age – Date of birth	Height	Club
G	4	Miguel Oczon	18 – March 29, 2000	6 ft 0 in (1.83 m)	National University (Philippines)
F	5	Dalph Panopio	18 – June 10, 2000	6 ft 1 in (1.85 m)	A.S. Stella Azzurra
PG	6	Gerry Austin Abadiano	17 – March 8, 2001	5 ft 11 in (1.8 m)	National University (Philippines)
PF	7	Xyrus Dane Torres	17 – September 23, 2000	6 ft 0 in (1.83 m)	Far Eastern University – FERN College
F	8	Joshua Ramirez	18 – February 22, 2000	6 ft 4 in (1.93 m)	National University (Philippines)
SG	9	Rhayyan Amsali	17 – December 28, 2000	6 ft 4 in (1.93 m)	San Beda University
PF	10	Dave Ildefonso	18 – April 14, 2000	6 ft 0 in (1.83 m)	National University (Philippines)
F	11	Raven Angelo Cortez	15 – October 23, 2002	6 ft 7 in (2.01 m)	De La Salle Santiago Zobel School
F	12	John Bismarck Lina	17 – March 14, 2001	6 ft 5 in (1.96 m)	University of Santo Tomas
C	13	Geo Chiu	17 – May 18, 2001	6 ft 8 in (2.03 m)	Ateneo de Manila University
F	14	A. J. Edu	18 – January 1, 2000	6 ft 11 in (2.11 m)	University of Toledo
C	15	Kai Sotto	16 – May 11, 2002	7 ft 1 in (2.16 m)	Ateneo de Manila University

Head coach

- (Philippines) Joshua Vincent Reyes

Assistant coach(es)

- (Philippines) Goldwyn Monteverde
- (Philippines) Michael Oliver
- (Philippines) John Arenas
- (Philippines) Gilbert Lao

Legend

- (c) Team captain
- Age field is age on August 5, 2018

=== 2016 FIBA Asia Under-18 Championship ===
Philippines roster at the 24th FIBA Asia Under-18 Championship:

Philippines Under-18 National Basketball Team - 2016 FIBA Asia Under-18 Championship - 7th place roster
Players
Coaches

Pos.	No.	Name	Age – Date of birth	Height	Club
G	4	Rendell Joseph Lee	18 – June 29, 1998	5 ft 10 in (1.78 m)	Xavier School
G	5	Jose Lorenzo Mendoza (C)	18 – January 31, 1998	5 ft 10 in (1.78 m)	Ateneo de Manila University
G/F	6	Gian Mamuyac (C)	17 – March 5, 1999	6 ft 0 in (1.83 m)	Ateneo de Manila University
G/F	7	Adrian John Emanuel Tamayo	16 – December 30, 1999	5 ft 9 in (1.75 m)	University of Perpetual Help System Laguna
F/C	8	Jonas Raphael Tibayan	17 – January 27, 1999	6 ft 3 in (1.91 m)	Chiang Kai Shek College
C	9	John Bryle Bahio	18 – May 23, 1998	6 ft 5 in (1.96 m)	San Beda College
C	10	Kemark Cariño	18 – February 1, 1998	6 ft 8 in (2.03 m)	San Beda College
F	11	Joshua Sinclair	18 – March 2, 1998	6 ft 4 in (1.93 m)	National University (Philippines)
F	12	Alain Jethro Madrigal	17 – November 25, 1998	6 ft 3 in (1.91 m)	La Salle Green Hills
G	13	John Vincent Gallego	18 – March 26, 1998	5 ft 10 in (1.78 m)	National University (Philippines)
G	14	Kris Harvey Pagsanjan	17 – January 2, 1999	6 ft 0 in (1.83 m)	Hope Christian High School
G	15	Fran Yu	18 – June 16, 1998	5 ft 10 in (1.78 m)	Traill International School

Head coach

- Michael Oliver

Assistant coach(es)

- Jonas Jaime Mendoza

Legend

- (C) Team captain
- nat field describes country
  of last club
  before the tournament
- Age field is age on July 22, 2016

=== 2016 SEABA Under-18 Championship ===
Philippines roster at the 10th SEABA Under-18 Championship:

Philippines Under-19 National Basketball Team - 2016 SEABA Under-18 Championship Champions roster
Players
Coaches

Pos.	No.	Name	Age – Date of birth	Height	Club
C	4	Will Gozum	17 – April 8, 1999	6 ft 6 in (1.98 m)	UP Integrated School
F	5	Joshua Sinclair	18 – March 2, 1998	6 ft 4 in (1.93 m)	National University (Philippines)
F	6	Alain Jethro Madrigal	17 – November 25, 1998	6 ft 3 in (1.91 m)	La Salle Green Hills
G/F	7	Gian Mamuyac	17 – March 5, 1999	6 ft 2 in (1.88 m)	Ateneo de Manila University
G	8	Evan Nelle	17 – June 8, 1998	5 ft 10 in (1.78 m)	San Beda College
G	9	Fran Yu	17 – June 16, 1998	5 ft 10 in (1.78 m)	Traill International School
G	10	Jose Lorenzo Mendoza (c)	18 – January 31, 1998	5 ft 10 in (1.78 m)	Ateneo de Manila University
G	11	Rendell Joseph Lee	17 – June 29, 1998	5 ft 10 in (1.78 m)	Xavier School
G	12	Pedro III Alfaro	17 – December 17, 1998	5 ft 10 in (1.78 m)	San Beda College
G/F	13	Theo Joshua Flores	18 – March 31, 1998	6 ft 2 in (1.88 m)	National University (Philippines)
F/C	14	Jonas Raphael Tibayan	17 – January 27, 1999	6 ft 4 in (1.93 m)	Chiang Kai Shek College
C	15	John Bryle Bahio	17 – May 23, 1998	6 ft 5 in (1.96 m)	San Beda College

Head coach

- Michael Oliver

Assistant coach(es)

- Jonas Jaime Mendoza
- MC Abolucion

Legend

- (C) Team captain
- nat field describes country
  of last club
  before the tournament
- Age field is age on April 23, 2016

=== 2014 FIBA Asia Under-18 Championship ===
Philippines roster at the 23rd FIBA Asia Under-18 Championship:

Philippines Under-18 National Basketball Team - 2014 FIBA Asia Under-18 Championship - 5th place roster
Players
Coaches

Pos.	No.	Name	Age – Date of birth	Height	Club
G	4	Jose IV Go	17 – January 16, 1997	5 ft 10 in (1.78 m)	Hope Christian High School
G	5	Aaron Black (c)	17 – December 3, 1996	6 ft 0 in (1.83 m)	Ateneo de Manila University
G/F	6	Dave Wilson Yu	18 – January 16, 1996	6 ft 2 in (1.88 m)	National University (Philippines)
F	7	Mark Dyke	16 – September 29, 1997	6 ft 2 in (1.88 m)	National University (Philippines)
G	8	Paul Desiderio	17 – February 2, 1997	6 ft 1 in (1.85 m)	University of the Philippines
F/C	9	Richard Escoto	17 – March 21, 1997	6 ft 3 in (1.91 m)	Far Eastern University
G	10	Andrei Caracut (c)	18 – January 30, 1996	5 ft 7 in (1.7 m)	San Beda College
G	11	Ranbill Angelo Tongco	18 – February 15, 1996	5 ft 9 in (1.75 m)	San Beda College
F/C	12	Leonard Santillan	18 – March 5, 1996	6 ft 5 in (1.96 m)	University of Visayas
G	13	Manuel Isidro III Mosqueda	18 – May 13, 1996	6 ft 0 in (1.83 m)	National University (Philippines)
F	14	Kobe Paras	16 – September 19, 1997	6 ft 5 in (1.96 m)	Cathedral High School (Los Angeles)
F	15	Brandrey Bienes	17 – September 13, 1996	6 ft 3 in (1.91 m)	Far Eastern University – Nicanor Reyes Educational Foundation

Head coach

- Michael Ray Jarin

Assistant coach(es)

- Jonas Jaime Mendoza
- Venancio Johnson Paras, Jr.

Legend

- (C) Team captain
- nat field describes country
  of last club
  before the tournament
- Age field is age on August 19, 2014

=== 2014 SEABA Under-18 Championship ===
Philippines roster at the 9th SEABA Under-18 Championship:

Philippines Under-18 National Basketball Team - 2014 SEABA Under-18 Championship Champions roster
Players
Coaches

Pos.	No.	Name	Age – Date of birth	Height	Club
PG	4	Renzar Henry Asilum	18 – April 14, 1996	5 ft 8 in (1.73 m)	University of the Philippines
PG	5	Andrei Caracut (c)	18 – January 30, 1996	5 ft 7 in (1.7 m)	San Beda College
SG	6	Aaron Black (c)	17 – December 3, 1996	5 ft 11 in (1.8 m)	Ateneo de Manila University
SF	7	Thirdy Ravena	17 – December 17, 1996	6 ft 2 in (1.88 m)	Ateneo de Manila University
F	8	Paul Desiderio	17 – February 2, 1997	6 ft 1 in (1.85 m)	University of the Philippines
PF	9	Mark Dyke	16 – September 29, 1997	6 ft 2 in (1.88 m)	National University (Philippines)
G	10	Jose IV Go	17 – January 16, 1997	6 ft 0 in (1.83 m)	Hope Christian High School
C	11	Richard Escoto	17 – March 21, 1997	6 ft 6 in (1.98 m)	Far Eastern University
PG	12	Ranbill Angelo Tongco	18 – February 15, 1996	5 ft 10 in (1.78 m)	San Beda College
SG	13	Dave Wilson Yu (c)	18 – January 16, 1996	5 ft 11 in (1.8 m)	National University (Philippines)
PF	14	Dawn Hynric Ochea	–	6 ft 3 in (1.91 m)	Adamson University
C	15	Leonard Santillan	18 – March 5, 1996	6 ft 5 in (1.96 m)	University of Visayas

Head coach

- Michael Ray Jarin

Assistant coach(es)

- Jonas Jaime Mendoza
- Jing Ruiz
- Ricky Reyes

Legend

- (C) Team captain
- nat field describes country
  of last club
  before the tournament
- Age field is age on May 5, 2014

=== 2012 FIBA Asia Under-18 Championship ===
Philippines roster at the 22nd FIBA Asia Under-18 Championship:

Philippines Under-18 National Basketball Team - Krist FIBA Asia Under-18 Championship - 6th place roster
Players
Coaches

Pos.	No.	Name	Age – Date of birth	Height	Club
G	4	Jjay Alejandro (c)	17 – April 13, 1995	5 ft 8.9 in (1.75 m)	National University (Philippines)
G	5	Janhubert Angelo Cani (c)	16 – December 9, 1995	5 ft 8.1 in (1.73 m)	National University (Philippines)
C	6	Michael Jay Javelosa	17 – August 1, 1995	6 ft 2.8 in (1.9 m)	Reedley International School
	7	Paul John Manzano	–		University of Western Sydney
G	8	Jerie Marlon Pingoy	17 – December 19, 1994		Far Eastern University – Nicanor Reyes Educational Foundation
	9	Mark Anthony Olayon	–		University of the East
F	10	Rashleigh Paolo Rivero	17 – February 19, 1995	6 ft 2 in (1.88 m)	La Salle Green Hills
	11	Kent Jefferson Lao	–		University of Santo Tomas
	12	Janus Kyle Christian Suarez	–		University of the Philippines
G	13	Rey Nambatac	18 – January 27, 1994		Colegio de San Juan de Letran
	14	Jeremy Martin Antonio	17 – October 19, 1994		De La Salle University
F/C	15	Kris Porter	17 – September 2, 1994	6 ft 5 in (1.96 m)	Ateneo de Manila University

Head coach

- Olsen Racela

Assistant coach(es)

- Nash Racela

Legend

- (C) Team captain
- nat field describes country
  of last club
  before the tournament
- Age field is age on August 17, 2012

=== 2012 SEABA Under-18 Championship ===
Philippines roster at the 8th SEABA Under-18 Championship:

Philippines Under-18 National Basketball Team - 2012 SEABA Under-18 Championship Champions roster
Players
Coaches

Pos.	No.	Name	Age – Date of birth	Height	Club
G	4	Jjay Alejandro (c)	17 – April 13, 1995	5 ft 8.9 in (1.75 m)	National University (Philippines)
G	5	Janhubert Angelo Cani (c)	16 – December 9, 1995	5 ft 8.1 in (1.73 m)	National University (Philippines)
C	6	Michael Jay Javelosa	16 – August 1, 1995	6 ft 2.8 in (1.9 m)	Reedley International School
	7	Ronnie Rosetom de Leon	–		University of the East
	8	Jose Remy II Morada	–		Emilio Aguinaldo College
	9	Mark Anthony Olayon	–		University of the East
F	10	Rashleigh Paolo Rivero	17 – February 19, 1995	6 ft 2 in (1.88 m)	La Salle Green Hills
	11	Kent Jefferson Lao	–		University of Santo Tomas
	12	Janus Kyle Christian Suarez	–		University of the Philippines
G	13	Rey Nambatac	18 – January 27, 1994		Colegio de San Juan de Letran
	14	Mario Emmanuel Bonleon	17 – August 25, 1994		La Salle Green Hills
C	15	Isaac Go	15 – June 7, 1996	6 ft 6 in (1.98 m)	Xavier School

Head coach

- Olsen Racela

Assistant coach(es)

- Nash Racela

Legend

- (C) Team captain
- nat field describes country
  of last club
  before the tournament
- Age field is age on June 26, 2012

=== 2010 FIBA Asia Under-18 Championship ===
Philippines roster at the 21st FIBA Asia Under-18 Championship:

Philippines Under-18 National Basketball Team - 2010 FIBA Under-18 Championship - 5th place roster
Players
Coaches

Pos.	No.	Name	Age – Date of birth	Height	Club
G	4	Kiefer Ravena (c)	16 – October 27, 1993	5 ft 11 in (1.8 m)	Ateneo de Manila University
G	5	Von Pessumal	17 – February 12, 1993	6 ft 2 in (1.88 m)	Ateneo de Manila University
G	6	Gelo Alolino	16 – January 4, 1994	5 ft 11 in (1.8 m)	National University (Philippines)
G	7	Raphael Banal	18 – January 28, 1992	6 ft 1 in (1.85 m)	Ateneo de Manila University
G	8	Roldan Sara	17 – January 20, 1993	5 ft 8 in (1.73 m)	San Beda College
F	9	Kyle Neypes	–	6 ft 3 in (1.91 m)	University of Perpetual Help System
G/F	10	Jeron Teng	16 – March 21, 1994	6 ft 1 in (1.85 m)	Xavier School
C	11	Russel Escoto	17 – December 4, 1992	6 ft 5 in (1.96 m)	Far Eastern University – Nicanor Reyes Educational Foundation
F	12	Gwyne Capacio	18 – June 1, 1992	6 ft 2 in (1.88 m)	De La Salle Santiago Zobel School
G	13	Mike Tolomia	17 – January 6, 1993	5 ft 11 in (1.8 m)	Far Eastern University – Nicanor Reyes Educational Foundation
C	14	Troy Rosario	18 – January 20, 1992	6 ft 6 in (1.98 m)	National University (Philippines)
C	15	Kevin Ferrer	17 – March 26, 1993	6 ft 4 in (1.93 m)	University of Santo Tomas

Head coach

- Eric Altamirano

Legend

- (C) Team captain
- nat field describes country
  of last club
  before the tournament
- Age field is age on September 22, 2010

=== 2010 SEABA Under-18 Championship ===
Philippines roster at the 7th SEABA Under-18 Championship:

Philippines Under-18 National Basketball Team - 2010 SEABA Under-18 Championship Champions roster
Players
Coaches

Pos.	No.	Name	Age – Date of birth	Height	Club
G		Kiefer Ravena (c)	16 – October 27, 1993	5 ft 11 in (1.8 m)	Ateneo de Manila University
G		Von Pessumal	17 – February 12, 1993	6 ft 2 in (1.88 m)	Ateneo de Manila University
G		Gelo Alolino	16 – January 4, 1994	5 ft 11 in (1.8 m)	National University (Philippines)
G/F		Raphael Banal	18 – January 28, 1992	6 ft 1 in (1.85 m)	Ateneo de Manila University
G		Roldan Sara	17 – January 20, 1993	5 ft 8 in (1.73 m)	San Beda College
G/F		Jeron Teng	16 – March 21, 1994	6 ft 1 in (1.85 m)	Xavier School
C		Russel Escoto	17 – December 4, 1992	6 ft 5 in (1.96 m)	Far Eastern University – Nicanor Reyes Educational Foundation
G		Mike Tolomia	17 – January 6, 1993	5 ft 11 in (1.8 m)	Far Eastern University – Nicanor Reyes Educational Foundation
C		Troy Rosario	18 – January 20, 1992	6 ft 6 in (1.98 m)	National University (Philippines)
C		Kevin Ferrer	17 – March 26, 1993	6 ft 4 in (1.93 m)	University of Santo Tomas
		Michael Anthony Pate	17 – May 15, 1993		La Salle Green Hills
		Cederick Labing-isa	–		University of Santo Tomas

Head coach

- Eric Altamirano

Legend

- (C) Team captain
- nat field describes country
  of last club
  before the tournament
- Age field is age on July 5, 2010

=== 2008 FIBA Asia Under-18 Championship ===
Philippines roster at the 20th FIBA Asia Under-18 Championship:

Philippines Under-18 National Basketball Team - 2008 FIBA Asia Under-18 Championship - 7th place roster
Players
Coaches

Pos.	No.	Name	Age – Date of birth	Height	Club
G	4	RR Garcia	18 – January 12, 1990	5 ft 11 in (1.8 m)	Southern City College
G	5	Joseph Terso	18 – May 18, 1990	5 ft 11 in (1.8 m)	National University (Philippines)
C	6	Ian Sangalang	16 – December 20, 1991	6 ft 7 in (2.01 m)	Lubao Institute
G	7	Matthew Wright	17 – February 7, 1991	6 ft 2 in (1.88 m)	Martingrove Collegiate Institute
F	8	Jaypee Mendoza	17 – November 9, 1990	6 ft 3 in (1.91 m)	San Beda College
G	9	Sam Marata	17 – June 28, 1991	6 ft 2 in (1.88 m)	University of the Philippines Integrated School
C	10	Frank Golla	18 – January 17, 1990	6 ft 5 in (1.96 m)	Ateneo de Manila University
G	11	Joseph Tolentino	–	6 ft 0 in (1.83 m)	University of the Philippines Integrated School
G	12	Mark de Guzman	17 – October 9, 1990	6 ft 1 in (1.85 m)	La Salle Green Hills
C	13	Philip Paredes	16 – January 12, 1992	6 ft 5 in (1.96 m)	Sacred Heart of Jesus Montessori School
C	14	Norbert Torres	18 – January 12, 1990	6 ft 7 in (2.01 m)	Blessed Mother Teresa Catholic Secondary School
F	15	Gab Banal	17 – September 1, 1990	6 ft 3 in (1.91 m)	Xavier School

Head coach

- Franz Pumaren

Assistant coach(es)

- Derrick Pumaren
- Tonichi Yturri
- Kirk Collier

Legend

- (C) Team captain
- nat field describes country
  of last club
  before the tournament
- Age field is age on August 28, 2008

=== 2008 SEABA Under-18 Championship ===
Philippines roster at the 6th SEABA Under-18 Championship:

Philippines Under-18 National Basketball Team - 2008 SEABA Under-18 Championship Champions roster
Players
Coaches

Pos.	No.	Name	Age – Date of birth	Height	Club
G		Joseph Tolentino	–	6 ft 0 in (1.83 m)	University of the Philippines Integrated School
G		RR Garcia	18 – January 12, 1990	5 ft 11 in (1.8 m)	Southern City Colleges
F		Jaypee Mendoza	17 – November 9, 1990	6 ft 4 in (1.93 m)	National University (Philippines)
C		Norbert Torres	18 – January 12, 1990	6 ft 7 in (2.01 m)	Blessed Mother Teresa Catholic Secondary School
G		Mark de Guzman	17 – October 9, 1990	6 ft 1 in (1.85 m)	La Salle Green Hills
C		Ian Sangalang	16 – December 20, 1991	6 ft 7 in (2.01 m)	Lubao Institute
		Kyle Pascual	18 – April 13, 1990		Esperanza High School
C		Frank Golla	18 – January 17, 1990	6 ft 5 in (1.96 m)	Ateneo de Manila University
F		Gab Banal	17 – September 1, 1990	6 ft 3 in (1.91 m)	Xavier School
		Jed Manguera	17 – October 12, 1990		De La Salle Santiago Zobel School
G		Joseph Terso	17 – May 18, 1990	5 ft 11 in (1.8 m)	National University (Philippines)
G		Sam Marata	17 – June 28, 1991	6 ft 2 in (1.88 m)	University of the Philippines Integrated School

Head coach

- Franz Pumaren

Assistant coach(es)

- Dindo Pumaren

Legend

- (C) Team captain
- nat field describes country
  of last club
  before the tournament
- Age field is age on May 1, 2008

=== 2006 FIBA Asia Under-18 Championship ===
During the 2006 FIBA Asia Under-18 Championship held in Urumqi, China from September 1–9, 2006, the Philippines were still under the suspension slapped by FIBA, preventing the youth team to participate.

=== 2006 SEABA Under-18 Championship ===
During the 2006 SEABA Under-18 Championship held in Segamat, Malaysia from June 28–30, 2006, the Philippines were still under the suspension slapped by FIBA, preventing the youth team to participate.

=== 2004 FIBA Asia Under-18 Championship ===
Philippines roster at the 18th FIBA Asia Under-18 Championship:

Philippines Under-18 National Basketball Team - 2004 FIBA Asia Under-18 Championship - 13th place roster
Players
Coaches

Pos.	No.	Name	Age – Date of birth	Height	Club
C		Mark Canlas	18 – June 15, 1986	6 ft 5 in (1.96 m)	University of Santo Tomas
F		Jervy Cruz	18 – September 9, 1986	6 ft 3 in (1.91 m)	University of Santo Tomas
F		Dylan Ababou	17 – December 7, 1986	6 ft 1 in (1.85 m)	University of Santo Tomas
G		Daryl Bautista	–	6 ft 1 in (1.85 m)	University of Santo Tomas
G		Alvin John Calatayud	–	6 ft 0 in (1.83 m)	Philippine College of Criminology
G		Rodel Raneses	–	5 ft 9 in (1.75 m)	San Beda College
G		Harvey Aquino	–	5 ft 10 in (1.78 m)	Philippine College of Criminology
G		Michael Sy	–	5 ft 8 in (1.73 m)	De La Salle University
G		Diogenes Villame	–	5 ft 9 in (1.75 m)	Ateneo de Manila University
F		Andrian Celada	–	6 ft 1 in (1.85 m)	Philippine College of Criminology
F		Ram Panganiban	–	6 ft 2 in (1.88 m)	University of Perpetual Help System DALTA
F		Led Joseph Claravall	–	6 ft 2 in (1.88 m)	Mapua Institute of Technology

Head coach

- Johny Tam

Assistant coach(es)

- Ricardo King

Team manager

- Teodico Perena

Legend

- (C) Team captain
- nat field describes country
  of last club
  before the tournament
- Age field is age on September 14, 2004

=== 2004 SEABA Under-18 Championship ===
Philippines roster at the 4th SEABA Under-18 Championship:

Philippines Under-18 National Basketball Team - 2004 SEABA Under-18 Championship Champions roster
Players
Coaches

Pos.	No.	Name	Age – Date of birth	Height	Club
F		Kevin Rae Astorga (c)	–	6 ft 3 in (1.91 m)	International School Manila
G		Michael Vincent Baldos (c)	–	5 ft 11 in (1.8 m)	Ateneo de Manila University
F		Jay-R Taganas	16 – September 1, 1987	6 ft 3 in (1.91 m)	San Beda College
F		Ogie Menor	17 – December 4, 1986	6 ft 3 in (1.91 m)	San Beda College
G		James Martinez	17 – January 31, 1987	5 ft 9 in (1.75 m)	San Beda College
C		Martin Antonio	–	6 ft 5 in (1.96 m)	San Beda College
G		Alvin Calatayud	–	6 ft 0 in (1.83 m)	Philippine College of Criminology
G		Mike Sy	–	5 ft 9 in (1.75 m)	Xavier School
F		Dylan Ababou	17 – December 7, 1986	6 ft 3 in (1.91 m)	Siena College of Quezon City
G		Daryl Bautista	–	6 ft 1 in (1.85 m)	Adamson University
G		Jayson Castro	17 – June 30, 1986	5 ft 10 in (1.78 m)	Philippine Christian University
G		Carlo Medina	–	5 ft 5 in (1.65 m)	Ateneo de Manila University

Head coach

- Johny Tam

Assistant coach(es)

- Ching Marcelino
- Manny Dandan
- Eric King
- Britt Reroma

Legend

- (C) Team captain
- nat field describes country
  of last club
  before the tournament
- Age field is age on April 14, 2004

=== 2002 ABC Under-18 Championship ===
During the 2002 ABC Under-18 Championship held in Kuwait City, Kuwait from December 16–26, 2002, the Philippines failed to get past the SEABA qualifiers where it ended a dismal fourth place, preventing the youth team to participate.

=== 2002 SEABA Under-18 Championship ===
Philippines roster at the 3rd SEABA Under-18 Championship:

Philippines Under-18 National Basketball Team - 2002 SEABA Under-18 Championship - 4th place roster
Players
Coaches

Pos.	No.	Name	Age – Date of birth	Height	Club
C		Mark Lester Benitez	–	6 ft 6 in (1.98 m)	Jose Rizal University
G		Jerson Torculas	–	5 ft 10 in (1.78 m)
G		Miguel Lindaya	–	5 ft 10 in (1.78 m)
F		Jonathan Fernandez	–	6 ft 1 in (1.85 m)	National University
F		Jayfelson Agbayani	–	6 ft 2 in (1.88 m)	San Beda University
F		Benjamin Gadi	–	6 ft 3 in (1.91 m)
F		Michael Vincent Baldos	–	6 ft 4 in (1.93 m)	San Beda University
F		Hermes Jr. Sumalinog	–	6 ft 2 in (1.88 m)
F		Kevin Rae Astorga	–	6 ft 2 in (1.88 m)	International School Manila
G		Raymund Pacurib	–	5 ft 11 in (1.8 m)
F		Mark Louie Pradas	–	6 ft 2 in (1.88 m)
G		Roel Aurelio Escueta	–	5 ft 8 in (1.73 m)	San Beda University
G		Paul Nikki Fedelicio	–	5 ft 8 in (1.73 m)

Head coach

- Johny Tam

Assistant coach(es)

- Ching Marcelino
- Rene Baena

Team manager

- Rey Baula

Legend

- (C) Team captain
- nat field describes country
  of last club
  before the tournament
- Age field is age on July 30, 2002

=== 2000 ABC Under-18 Championship ===
During the 2000 ABC Under-18 Championship held in Kuala Lumpur, Malaysia from July 18–27, 2000, the Philippines were not able to join in the tournament; they participated instead at the 2000 ABC Under-20 Championship in Qatar.

=== 1996 ABC Under-18 Championship ===
Philippines roster at the 14th ABC Under-18 Championship:

Philippines Under-18 National Basketball Team - 1996 ABC Under-18 Championship - 6th Place roster
Players
Coaches

Pos.	No.	Name	Age – Date of birth	Height	Club
G		Paolo Mendoza	18 – April 22, 1978	5 ft 11 in (1.8 m)	University of the Philippines
F		Marvin Ortiguerra	18 – August 29, 1978	6 ft 5 in (1.96 m)	Mapúa Institute of Technology
G		Aries Dimaunahan	18 – March 21, 1978	6 ft 0 in (1.83 m)	University of Santo Tomas
		Efren Valdez	–		Las Piñas College
		Christopher Jorge Topacio	–		San Beda College
		Danzen Mariano	–		University of the Philippines
C		Yancy de Ocampo	16 – March 11, 1980	6 ft 7 in (2.01 m)	Saint Francis of Assisi College System
F		Teodoro Valera	18 – August 15, 1978	6 ft 2 in (1.88 m)	University of the East
C		Alvin Pua	17 – September 3, 1978	6 ft 5 in (1.96 m)	San Sebastian College - Recoletos
		Melchor Latoreno	–		University of Santo Tomas
G		Renren Ritualo	17 – June 14, 1979	6 ft 0 in (1.83 m)	San Beda College
		John Joseph Mesina	–		San Beda College

Head coach

- Edmundo Badolato

Assistant coach(es)

- Louie Alas

Team manager

Legend

- (C) Team captain
- nat field describes country
  of last club
  before the tournament
- Age field is age on September 1, 1996

=== 1996 SEABA Under-18 Championship ===
Philippines roster at the 1st SEABA Under-18 Championship:

Philippines Under-18 National Basketball Team - 1996 SEABA Under-18 Championship - Champions roster
Players
Coaches

Pos.	No.	Name	Age – Date of birth	Height	Club
C		Yancy de Ocampo	16 – March 11, 1980	6 ft 7 in (2.01 m)	Saint Francis of Assisi College System
F		Marvin Ortiguerra	17 – August 29, 1978	6 ft 5 in (1.96 m)	Mapúa Institute of Technology
		Melchor Latoreno	–		University of Santo Tomas
G		Aries Dimaunahan	18 – March 21, 1978	6 ft 0 in (1.83 m)	University of Santo Tomas
		John Joseph Mesina	–		San Beda College
C		Alvin Pua	17 – September 3, 1978	6 ft 5 in (1.96 m)	San Sebastian College - Recoletos
		Efren Valdez	–		Las Piñas College
F		Teodoro Valera	17 – August 15, 1978	6 ft 2 in (1.88 m)	University of the East
		Danzen Mariano	–		University of the Philippines
		Francis Jerome Reyes	–		Mapúa Institute of Technology
G		Renren Ritualo	17 – June 14, 1979	6 ft 0 in (1.83 m)	San Beda College
		Christopher Jorge Topacio	–		San Beda College
G		Michael Bravo	17 – May 5, 1979		University of the Philippines
G		Jay Lapinid	–		University of Santo Tomas

Head coach

- Edmundo Badolato

Assistant coach(es)
Team manager

Legend

- (C) Team captain
- nat field describes country
  of last club
  before the tournament
- Age field is age on July 27, 1996

=== 1992 ABC Under-18 Championship ===
Philippines roster at the 12th ABC Under-18 Championship:

Philippines Juniors National Basketball Team - 1992 ABC Under-18 Championship - Bronze Medallists roster
Players
Coaches

Pos.	No.	Name	Age – Date of birth	Height	Club
C		Dennis Espino	18 – December 20, 1973	6 ft 6 in (1.98 m)	University of Santo Tomas
F		Kenneth Duremdes	18 – January 31, 1974	6 ft 3 in (1.91 m)	Adamson University
		Ronilo Padilla	–		University of Cebu
		Christopher Cantonjos	18 – September 22, 1974		University of Santo Tomas
		Jumbo Cruz	–
G		Rodney Santos	19 – May 30, 1973	6 ft 2 in (1.88 m)	San Sebastian College - Recoletos
G		Patrick Fran	–		University of Santo Tomas
		Roy Literal	–		Adamson University
		Arnold Gamboa	19 – May 6, 1973		AMA Computer College
		Angelo David	–		Far Eastern University
		Ulysses Tanigue	–		University of Cebu
		Brian Orquillas	–		University of Cebu

Head coach

- Francis Rodriguez

Assistant coach(es)
Team manager

Legend

- (C) Team captain
- nat field describes country
  of last club
  before the tournament
- Age field is age on September 25, 1992

=== 1990 ABC Under-18 Championship ===
Philippines roster at the 11th ABC Under-18 Championship:

Philippines Juniors National Basketball Team - 1990 ABC Under-18 Championship - 4th Place roster
Players
Coaches

Pos.	No.	Name	Age – Date of birth	Height	Club
F/C		Zandro Jr. Limpot	18 – December 14, 1971	6 ft 5 in (1.96 m)
C		Edward Joseph Feihl	20 – March 27, 1970	6 ft 11 in (2.11 m)	University of Santo Tomas
C		Marlou Aquino	17 – October 7, 1972	6 ft 9 in (2.06 m)	University of Santo Tomas
F/C		Giovanni Pineda	19 – August 2, 1971	6 ft 4 in (1.93 m)	Adamson University
G		Segundo III dela Cruz	–	5 ft 11 in (1.8 m)	Adamson University
F		Luis Manuel Locsin	18 – October 19, 1971	6 ft 2 in (1.88 m)
PG		Teodorico III Fernandez	19 – July 30, 1971	5 ft 9 in (1.75 m)
G		Emmanuel Victoria	18 – May 9, 1972	5 ft 10 in (1.78 m)	San Beda University
G/F		Renato Cabaluna	–	6 ft 3 in (1.91 m)
G		Jonas Mariano	–	6 ft 0 in (1.83 m)
G		Richard Aquino	–	6 ft 0 in (1.83 m)
F		Peter Naron	19 – November 28, 1970	6 ft 3 in (1.91 m)	De La Salle University
F		Wilmer Ong	19 – September 20, 1970	6 ft 4 in (1.93 m)
F		Joaquin Torres	–	6 ft 3 in (1.91 m)

Head coach

- Francis Rodriguez

Assistant coach(es)

- Angel Ascue

Team manager

- Buddy Encarnado

Legend

- (C) Team captain
- nat field describes country
  of last club
  before the tournament
- Age field is age on August 25, 1990

=== 1989 ABC Under-18 Championship ===
Philippines roster at the 10th ABC Under-18 Championship:

Philippines Juniors National Basketball Team - 1989 ABC Under-18 Championship - Bronze Medallists roster
Players
Coaches

Pos.	No.	Name	Age – Date of birth	Height	Club
F/C	4	Joselito Guanio	20 – January 5, 1969	6 ft 2 in (1.88 m)	University of the Philippines
G	5	Rodericko Racela	18 – November 1, 1970	5 ft 9 in (1.75 m)	Ateneo de Manila University
G/F	6	Johnedel Cardel	18 – June 6, 1970	5 ft 10 in (1.78 m)	De La Salle University
F/C	7	Victor Pablo	18 – August 8, 1970	6 ft 3 in (1.91 m)	Far Eastern University
F	8	Vergel Meneses	20 – January 14, 1969	6 ft 3 in (1.91 m)	Jose Rizal University
G/F	9	Alejandro Lim	19 – August 22, 1969	6 ft 4 in (1.93 m)	University of the Visayas
F/C	10	Zandro Jr. Limpot	17 – December 14, 1971	6 ft 4 in (1.93 m)	De La Salle University
F	11	Robert Ruiz	19 – June 3, 1969	6 ft 2 in (1.88 m)	Colegio de San Juan de Letran
G/F	12	Ferdinand Ravena	18 – May 22, 1970	6 ft 2 in (1.88 m)	University of the East
C	13	Daniel Francisco	19 – April 21, 1969	6 ft 6 in (1.98 m)	Ateneo de Manila University
G	14	Dennis Ramirez	19 – November 19, 1969	5 ft 8 in (1.73 m)	San Beda College
C	15	Edward Joseph Feihl	18 – March 27, 1970	6 ft 11 in (2.11 m)	University of Santo Tomas

Head coach

- Edmundo Badolato

Assistant coach(es)

- Angel Ascue

Team manager

- Jose Romasanta

Legend

- (C) Team captain
- nat field describes country
  of last club
  before the tournament
- Age field is age on January 24, 1989

=== 1986 ABC Under-18 Championship ===
Philippines roster at the 9th ABC Under-18 Championship:

Philippines Juniors National Basketball Team - 1986 ABC Under-18 Championship - Silver Medallists roster
Players
Coaches

Pos.	No.	Name	Age – Date of birth	Height	Club
	4	Jun Reyes	19 – June 19, 1967		Ateneo de Manila University
	5	Nelson Asaytono	19 – January 25, 1967		University of Manila
	6	Paul Alvarez	18 – June 15, 1968		San Sebastian College – Recoletos
F	7	Joselito Guanio	17 – January 5, 1969	6 ft 2 in (1.88 m)	University of the Philippines
	8	Bobby Jose	18 – May 11, 1968		University of Santo Tomas
	9	Mark Anthony Magada	–		Trinity College of Quezon City
	10	Eric Reyes	19 – December 24, 1967		Ateneo de Manila University
	11	Arnold Adlawan	–		San Sebastian College – Recoletos
	12	Richard Bachmann	18 – January 11, 1968		De La Salle University
	13	Romulo Orillosa	–		Adamson University
	14	Benjie Paras	18 – October 2, 1968		University of the Philippines
	15	Zaldy Realubit	19 – February 18, 1967		University of San Jose–Recoletos

Head coach

- (Philippines) Joe Lipa

Assistant coach(es)

Legend

- (c) Team captain
- Age field is age on December 28, 1986

=== 1979 FIBA Under-19 World Championship ===
Philippines roster at the 1st FIBA Under-19 Basketball World Cup:

Philippines Under-19 National Basketball Team - 1979 FIBA Under-19 World Championship - 10th place roster
Players
Coaches

Pos.	No.	Name	Age – Date of birth	Height	Club
	4	Joel Banal	21 – February 6, 1958		Mapúa Institute of Technology
	5	Biboy Ravanes	20 – January 6, 1959		University of Cebu
	6	Conrado Pasco	20 – October 17, 1958		Far Eastern University
	7	Marte Saldaña	20 – February 23, 1959		Far Eastern University
	8	Bai Cristobal	20 – November 24, 1958		Far Eastern University
	9	JB Yango	20 – August 20, 1958		San Beda College
	10	Elpidio Villamin	20 – November 7, 1958		Far Eastern University
	11	Salvador Ramas	21 – August 5, 1958		University of Cebu
	12	Gary Vargas	20 – February 21, 1959		Philippine School of Business Administration
	13	Geronimo Lucido	–		De La Salle University
	14	Joaquin Loyzaga	20 – August 29, 1958		San Beda College
	15	Hector Calma	19 – March 2, 1960		Adamson University

Head coach

- (Philippines) Arturo Valenzona

Assistant coach(es)

- (Philippines) Sieg Guerrero
- (Philippines) Chee Poblete
- (Philippines) Larry Buenventura

Legend

- (c) Team captain
- Age field is age on August 15, 1979

=== 1972 ABC Junior Championship ===
Philippines roster at the 2nd ABC Junior Championship:

Philippines Juniors National Basketball Team - 1972 ABC Junior Championship - Gold Medallists roster
Players
Coaches

Pos.	No.	Name	Age – Date of birth	Height	Club
F	6	Atoy Co	21 – October 15, 1951	6 ft 2 in (1.88 m)	Mapúa Institute of Technology
F		Ompong Segura	21 – April 17, 1951	6 ft 2 in (1.88 m)	Adamson University
C		Ed Carvajal	–	6 ft 6 in (1.98 m)	José Rizal College
F		Ramon Fernandez	19 – October 3, 1953	6 ft 4 in (1.93 m)	University of San Carlos
F		Marcelino Diputado	–		San Sebastian College – Recoletos
F		Philip Cezar	20 – December 1, 1952	6 ft 3 in (1.91 m)	José Rizal College
F		Jimmy Noblezada	21 – December 26, 1950	6 ft 2 in (1.88 m)	University of San Agustin
G		Rino Salazar	20 – March 30, 1952	5 ft 9 in (1.75 m)	Colegio de San Juan de Letran
G		Joy Dionisio	–	5 ft 10 in (1.78 m)	Adamson University
G		Reynaldo Franco	–	5 ft 9 in (1.75 m)	University of the East
F		Norberto Rivera	20 – April 30, 1952	5 ft 11 in (1.8 m)	San Sebastian College – Recoletos
G		Miguel Bilbao	–	5 ft 8 in (1.73 m)	De La Salle College

Head coach

- Felicisimo Fajardo

Assistant coach(es)
Team manager

Legend

- (C) Team captain
- nat field describes country
  of last club
  before the tournament
- Age field is age on December 10, 1972

=== 1970 ABC Junior Championship ===
Philippines roster at the 1st ABC Junior Championship:

Philippines Juniors National Basketball Team - 1970 ABC Junior Championship - Gold Medallists roster
Players
Coaches

Pos.	No.	Name	Age – Date of birth	Height	Club
G		Rosalio Martirez	23 – September 9, 1946		Southwestern University (Philippines)
G		Eusebio Adolfo	–		Southwestern University (Philippines)
F		Manny Paner	21 – May 17, 1949		University of the Visayas
G		Olympio Santos	–		José Rizal College
F		William Adornado	19 – May 26, 1951		University of Santo Tomas
		Jesus San Diego	–		Mapúa Institute of Technology
		Johnny Revilla	22 – May 26, 1948		University of the East
F		Marte Samson	19 – July 22, 1951		Ateneo de Manila University
		Ernesto Estrada	20 – November 7, 1949		University of the Visayas
		Rodolfo Soriano	23 – May 19, 1947		University of the East
		Ricardo Cleofas	19 – February 9, 1951		Ateneo de Manila University
G		Jesse Sullano	–		Southwestern University (Philippines)

Head coach

- Ignacio Ramos

Assistant coach(es)
Team manager

Legend

- (C) Team captain
- nat field describes country
  of last club
  before the tournament
- Age field is age on August 25, 1970

== See also ==
- Philippines men's national basketball team
- Philippines men's national under-17 basketball team
- Philippines women's national under-18 basketball team
