= South Korea men's national under-19 basketball team =

South Korea
- FIBA ranking: 22 ▲9 (December 2025)
- Joined FIBA: 1947
- FIBA zone: FIBA Asia
- National federation: Korea Basketball Association
- Coach: Kim Seung-hwan

U19 World Cup
- Appearances: 9
- Medals: None

U18 Asia Cup
- Appearances: 27
- Medals: Gold: 4 (1984, 1995, 2000, 2022); Silver: 6 (1974, 1992, 2004, 2006, 2010, 2012); Bronze: 6 (1970, 1972, 1982, 2002, 2014, 2016)
Home	Away

The South Korea men's national under-18 and under-19 basketball team is a national basketball team of South Korea, administered by the Korea Basketball Association. It represents the country in international under-18 and under-19 men's basketball competitions.

== FIBA U18 Asia Cup participations ==
Year	Result
1970	3rd place, bronze medalist(s)
1972	3rd place, bronze medalist(s)
1974	2nd place, silver medalist(s)
1977	7th
1978	DNP
1980	7th
1982	3rd place, bronze medalist(s)
1984	1st place, gold medalist(s)
1986	4th
1989	5th
1990	9th
1992	2nd place, silver medalist(s)
1995	1st place, gold medalist(s)
1996	4th

Year	Result
1998	9th
2000	1st place, gold medalist(s)
2002	3rd place, bronze medalist(s)
2004	2nd place, silver medalist(s)
2006	2nd place, silver medalist(s)
2008	6th
2010	2nd place, silver medalist(s)
2012	2nd place, silver medalist(s)
2014	3rd place, bronze medalist(s)
2016	3rd place, bronze medalist(s)
2018	8th
2022	1st place, gold medalist(s)
2024	5th
2026	4th

== FIBA Under-19 Basketball World Cup record ==
Year	Pos.	Pld	W	L
(Brazil) 1979	Did not qualify			
(Spain) 1983	Did not qualify			
(Italy) 1987	Did not qualify			
(Canada) 1991	Did not qualify			
(Greece) 1995	15th	8	3	5
(Portugal) 1999	Did not qualify			
(Greece) 2003	12th	8	2	6
(Serbia) 2007	11th	8	3	5
(New Zealand) 2009	Did not qualify			
(Latvia) 2011	15th	5	2	3
(Czech Republic) 2013	13th	6	2	4
(Greece) 2015	12th	7	1	6
(Egypt) 2017	14th	7	1	6
(Greece) 2019	Did not qualify			
(Latvia) 2021	15th	7	1	6
(Hungary) 2023	12th	7	1	6
(Switzerland) 2025	Did not qualify			
(Czech Republic) 2027	Qualified			
(Indonesia) 2029	To be determined			
Total	10/19	63	16	47

== See also ==
- South Korea men's national basketball team
- South Korea men's national under-17 basketball team
- South Korea women's national basketball team
