= Angelito Esguerra =

Filipino basketball player and coach

Magnolia Chicken Timplados Hotshots
- Title: Assistant coach
- League: PBA

Personal information
- Born: August 2, 1959 (age 67)
- Listed height: 6 ft 1 in (1.85 m)
- Listed weight: 180 lb (82 kg)

Career information
- College: Letran
- Playing career: 1983–1989
- Position: Forward
- Number: 11, 16
- Coaching career: 1999–present

Career history

Playing
- 1983: Crispa Redmanizers
- 1984–1986: Manila Beer Brewmasters
- 1987: Tanduay Rhum Makers
- 1988–1989: Shell Rimula X Diesel Oilers

Coaching
- 1993: Xavier University
- 1995–1998: Stag Pale Pilseners (assistant)
- 1995: Philippines (assistant)
- 1999–2000: Tanduay Rhum Masters (assistant)
- 2000: UE
- 2016–present: Magnolia Chicken Timplados Hotshots

Career highlights
- As player: 4× PBA champion (1983 All-Filipino, 1983 Reinforced Filipino, 1983 Open); Grand Slam champion (1983); NCAA champion (1979); As assistant coach: PBA champion (2018 Governors')
Medals
Men's basketball
Representing Philippines
SEA Games
| Gold medal – first place | 1981 Manila | Team |
| Gold medal – first place | 1983 Singapore | Team |
Assistant coach for Philippines
SEA Games
| Gold medal – first place | 1995 Chiang Mai | Team |

Angelito "Itoy" Esguerra (August 2, 1959), is a Filipino professional basketball coach and former player currently serves as an assistant coach for the Magnolia Chicken Timplados Hotshots of the Philippine Basketball Association (PBA). He was nicknamed "The Rifleman" while playing at his peak.

== Playing career ==
=== Collegiate ===
Esguerra played for Letran Knights in NCAA, and won a championship in 1979, defeating San Beda.

=== Professional ===
Esguerra played for Tommy Manotoc-coached Crispa Redmanizers that won a grandslam in 1983. He also played for Manila Beer Brewmasters, Tanduay Rhum Makers, and Formula Shell.

== Coaching career ==
Esguerra was joined his former team's coaching staff when it was revived in 1999, which Alfrancis Chua coaching the team. He stayed until 2000, when he coached the UE Red Warriors for one season. He already served as an assistant for its PBL team from 1995. He also served as head coach of Xavier University and an assistant for Philippine basketball team.

In 2016, Esguerra returned to coaching by being tapped as an assistant coach to Chito Victolero for Star Hotshots.
