= SEABA Under-18 Championship =

Southeast Asian basketball tournament

- Current season, competition or edition: 2026 SEABA Under-18 Championship
- Sport: Basketball
- Founded: 1996
- Country: SEABA member nations
- Continent: FIBA Asia (Asia)
- Most recent champion: Philippines (10th title)
- Most titles: Philippines (10 titles)

The SEABA Under-18 Championship is an under-18 basketball championship in the International Basketball Federation's Southeast Asia Basketball Association, one of FIBA Asia's subzone. The event started in 1996 and is held bi-annually (except in 2000). The winners represent SEABA in the FIBA Asia Under-18 Championship.

The Philippines are the defending champions, and the most successful team in the subzone, have won their seventh straight title since 2008 and their tenth title overall. Malaysia have won the other two titles, in 2002 and 2006 and consistently the second-best team in the region.

== Summary ==
Year	Host	Champion	Second Place	Third Place	Fourth Place
1996; Details	(Philippines); Santa Cruz	Philippines	Singapore	Malaysia	Indonesia
1998; Details	(Thailand); Bangkok	Philippines	Malaysia	Thailand	Singapore
2002; Details	(Malaysia); Kuala Lumpur	Malaysia	Thailand	Indonesia	Philippines
2004; Details	(Philippines); Lucena	Philippines	Singapore	Thailand	Malaysia
2006; Details	(Malaysia); Segamat	Malaysia	Singapore	Thailand	
2008; Details	(Malaysia); Kuala Lumpur	Philippines	Malaysia	Thailand	Singapore
2010; Details	(Myanmar); Yangon	Philippines	Malaysia	Thailand	Singapore
2012; Details	Singapore	Philippines	Indonesia	Singapore	Malaysia
2014; Details	(Malaysia); Tawau	Philippines	Malaysia	Indonesia	Singapore
2016; Details	(Indonesia); Medan	Philippines	Thailand	Indonesia	Malaysia
2024; Details	(Malaysia); Kuala Lumpur	Philippines	Indonesia	Malaysia	Thailand
2026; Details	(Thailand); Krabi	Philippines	Thailand	Malaysia	Indonesia

== Medal table ==
Rank	Nation	Gold	Silver	Bronze	Total
1	Philippines	10	0	0	10
2	Malaysia	2	4	3	9
3	Thailand	0	3	5	8
4	Singapore	0	3	1	4
5	Indonesia	0	2	3	5
Totals (5 entries)		12	12	12	36
