= 1996 SEABA Under-18 Championship =

1996 SEABA U-18 Championship
1st Southeast Asian Basketball Championship

Tournament details
- Host country: Philippines
- Dates: July 27–30
- Teams: 4 (from 10 federations)
- Venue: 1 (in 1 host city)

Final positions
- Champions: Philippines (1st title)

The 1996 SEABA Under-18 Championship was the qualifying tournament for Southeast Asia Basketball Association at the 1996 ABC Under-18 Championship. This was the maiden tournament for SEABA Under-18 Championship and was held in Santa Cruz, Laguna, Philippines from July 27 to 30. The games were scheduled to open on July 26 but was postponed due to floods caused by Typhoon Gloria (Gloring).

The Philippines swept all of their assignments en route to their maiden title by thrashing Singapore in the finals, 93–64. Both finalists joined 1996 ABC Under-18 Championship hosts Malaysia and Thailand to represent SEABA subzone.

== Round robin ==
July 27
14:30

Match Results

Philippines	86–75	Singapore
Scoring by half: 46–41, 40–34
Pts: Ritualo 15		Pts: Chua K.T. 26

San Luis Sports Complex, Santa Cruz

July 27
16:00

Indonesia	L–W	Malaysia

San Luis Sports Complex, Santa Cruz

July 28

Indonesia	L–W	Singapore

San Luis Sports Complex, Santa Cruz

July 28

Malaysia	L–W	Philippines

San Luis Sports Complex, Santa Cruz

July 29

Match Results

Singapore	67–62	Malaysia
Pts: Chua K.T. 33

San Luis Sports Complex, Santa Cruz

July 29

Match Results

Philippines	113–42	Indonesia
Scoring by half: 63–20, 50–22
Pts: Ritualo 22

San Luis Sports Complex, Santa Cruz

== Final round ==
=== Third place match ===
July 30
16:30

Malaysia	?–?	Indonesia

San Luis Sports Complex, Santa Cruz

=== Final ===
July 30
18:00

Match Results

Singapore	64–93	Philippines
Pts: Wong S.Y., Koh M.K. 15		Pts: Ritualo 23

San Luis Sports Complex, Santa Cruz

== Final standings ==
Qualified for the 1996 ABC Under-18 Championship
Qualified as the hosts of the 1996 ABC Under-18 Championship

Rank	Team
Gold medal	Philippines
Silver medal	Singapore
Bronze medal	Malaysia
4	Indonesia

== Awards ==
1996 SEABA Under-18 champions

Philippines
First title
