= 2004 SEABA Under-18 Championship =

2004 SEABA U-18 Championship
4th Southeast Asian Basketball Championship

Tournament details
- Host country: Philippines
- Dates: April 14–17
- Teams: 4
- Venue(s): 1 (in 1 host city)

Final positions
- Champions: Philippines (3rd title)

Tournament statistics
- MVP: (Philippines) Rogemar Menor

The 2004 SEABA Under-18 Championship was the qualifying tournament for Southeast Asia Basketball Association at the 2004 FIBA Asia Under-18 Championship. The tournament was held in Lucena, Quezon, the Philippines from April 14 to April 17. Quezon Convention Center was the venue of all the games. The hosts won their third overall title by sweeping all of their assignments to earn right to represent SEABA together with the second-placer Singapore.

Indonesia was supposed to participate at the tournament but withdrew a few days before the first match was due to be played

== Round robin ==
Qualified for the final

Team	Pld	W	L	PF	PA	PD	Pts
Philippines	3	3	0	277	174	+103	6
Singapore	3	2	1	203	201	+2	5
Thailand	3	1	2	238	235	+3	4
Malaysia	3	0	3	176	235	−59	3

April 14
12:30

Match Results

Philippines	84–44	Malaysia
Scoring by half: 40–24, 44–20
Pts: Martinez 14		Pts: Lee 12

Quezon Convention Center, Lucena

April 14
15:00

Match Results

Thailand	75–76	Singapore

Quezon Convention Center, Lucena

April 15
12:30

Match Results

Malaysia	70–74	Thailand

Quezon Convention Center, Lucena

April 15
15:00

Match Results

Singapore	50–104	Philippines
Scoring by half: 27–60, 23–44
Pts: Yong 11		Pts: Menor, Bautista 15

Quezon Convention Center, Lucena

April 16
12:30

Match Results

Philippines	89–80	Thailand
Scoring by half: 43–40, 46–40
Pts: Martinez 24		Pts: Phoonsoongjeon 20

Quezon Convention Center, Lucena

April 16
15:00

Match Results

Singapore	77–62	Malaysia

Quezon Convention Center, Lucena

== Final ==
April 17
15:00

Match Results

Philippines	99–53	Singapore
Scoring by half: 50–21, 49–32
Pts: Martinez 21		Pts: Oh 12

Quezon Convention Center, Lucena

== Final standings ==
Qualified for the 2004 FIBA Asia Under-18 Championship

Rank	Team
1st place, gold medalist(s)	Philippines
2nd place, silver medalist(s)	Singapore
3rd place, bronze medalist(s)	Thailand
4	Malaysia

== Awards ==
2004 SEABA Under-18 champions

Philippines
Third title

Most Valuable Player
(Philippines) Rogemar Menor
