= 2026 SEABA Under-18 Championship =

2026 SEABA U-18 Championship
12th FIBA Under-18 Asia Cup SEABA Qualifiers

Tournament details
- Host country: Thailand
- City: Krabi
- Dates: 10–14 June
- Teams: 7 (from 1 sub-confederation)
- Venue: 1 (in 1 host city)

Final positions
- Champions: Philippines (10th title)
- Runners-up: Thailand
- Third place: Malaysia

Tournament statistics
- MVP: (Philippines) Joaquin Tovera
- Top scorer: (Philippines) Joaquin Tovera (16.4)
- Top rebounds: (Indonesia) Steven Sebastian (11.0)
- Top assists: (Indonesia) Miracle Christiano (8.0)
- PPG (Team): Philippines (108.8)
- RPG (Team): Philippines (54.6)
- APG (Team): Philippines (26.0)

The 2026 SEABA Under-18 Championship, also known as 2026 FIBA U18 Asia Cup SEABA Qualifiers, was the 12th edition of SEABA basketball championship for young men aged 18 and under. The qualifying tournament for the 2026 FIBA U18 Asia Cup, it was held in Krabi, Thailand, from 10 to 14 June 2026. This was the second time that Thailand hosted the event; the previous one was held in Bangkok in 1998.

The Philippines secured their 10th overall title with a victory over Thailand in the final, 85–70. Both finalists qualified for the continental championship.

== Participating teams ==
- Indonesia
- Laos
- Malaysia
- Philippines
- Singapore
- Thailand (Hosts)
- Vietnam

== Preliminary round ==
The official groupings were released on 24 May 2026.

All times are local (Time in Thailand; UTC+7).

=== Group A ===
Pos	Team	Pld	W	L	PF	PA	PD	Pts	Qualification
1	Philippines	3	3	0	329	141	+188	6	Semifinals
2	Thailand (H)	3	2	1	218	223	−5	5	Semifinals
3	Singapore	3	1	2	211	253	−42	4	5th place classification
4	Vietnam	3	0	3	152	293	−141	3	6th–7th place classification

Source: FIBA
Rules for classification: 1) Points; 2) Head-to-head results; 3) Points difference; 4) Points scored.
(H) Hosts

10 June 2026
13:00

FIBA Live Stats

Philippines	121–28	Vietnam
Scoring by quarter: 39–11, 29–4, 25–0, 28–13
Pts: Aguas 19; Rebs: Cariño, Espinas 7 Asts: Moral 10		Pts: Tuấn Hưng 10; Rebs: Tuấn Hưng 7 Asts: 3 players 2

Chan Ka Pho Gymnasium, Krabi
Referees: Chen Hsin (TPE), Tan Kian Hua (MAS), Deni Triyanto (INA)

10 June 2026
18:30

FIBA Live Stats

Thailand	74–70	Singapore
Scoring by quarter: 13–14, 18–19, 26–25, 17–12
Pts: Aiyakan 15; Rebs: Thanawat 14; Asts: Peerakan, Thanawat 4		Pts: Shabbir 17; Rebs: Firdaus 9 Asts: Choo 6

Chan Ka Pho Gymnasium, Krabi
Referees: Li Jin (CHN), Lê Phạm Trung Kiên (VIE), Manuel Felix Jr. (PHI)

11 June 2026
15:30

FIBA Live Stats

Singapore	50–110	Philippines
Scoring by quarter: 11–28, 12–28, 13–33, 14–21
Pts: Shabbir 14; Rebs: Clark 7 Asts: Choo, D. Ng 3		Pts: Cariño 21; Rebs: Aguas 8 Asts: Moral, Tovera 7

Chan Ka Pho Gymnasium, Krabi
Referees: Li Jin (CHN), Deni Triyanto (INA), Lê Phạm Trung Kiên (VIE)

11 June 2026
18:00

FIBA Live Stats

Vietnam	55–81	Thailand
Scoring by quarter: 20–23, 10–15, 12–26, 13–17
Pts: Tuấn Hưng 13; Rebs: Minh Anh 8 Asts: Minh Anh, Cao Nguyên 3		Pts: Puttipon 22; Rebs: Ravazzini 10; Asts: Aiyakan 7

Chan Ka Pho Gymnasium, Krabi
Referees: Chen Hsin (TPE), Prem Kumar Kanneboina (IND), Tan Kian Hua (MAS)

12 June 2026
15:30

FIBA Live Stats

Singapore	91–69	Vietnam
Scoring by quarter: 27–17, 17–19, 23–16, 24–17
Pts: Shabbir 23; Rebs: Leow 7 Asts: D. Ng 13		Pts: Minh Anh 20; Rebs: Cao Nguyên 9 Asts: Tuấn Hưng 4

Chan Ka Pho Gymnasium, Krabi
Referees: Chen Hsin (TPE), Manuel Felix Jr. (PHI), Deni Triyanto (INA)

12 June 2026
18:00

FIBA Live Stats

Thailand	63–98	Philippines
Scoring by quarter: 15–21, 18–26, 15–27, 15–24
Pts: Phurich 15; Rebs: Thanawat 15; Asts: Thanawat 3		Pts: Cariño 18; Rebs: 3 players 6 Asts: Tovera 7

Chan Ka Pho Gymnasium, Krabi
Referees: Li Jin (CHN), Tan Kian Hua (MAS), Michelle Chian Yie Tsen (SGP)

=== Group B ===
Pos	Team	Pld	W	L	PF	PA	PD	Pts	Qualification
1	Indonesia	2	2	0	154	90	+64	4	Semifinals
2	Malaysia	2	1	1	171	122	+49	3	Semifinals
3	Laos	2	0	2	92	205	−113	2	5th place classification

Source: FIBA
Rules for classification: 1) Points; 2) Head-to-head results; 3) Points difference; 4) Points scored.

10 June 2026
15:30

FIBA Live Stats

Laos	57–116	Malaysia
Scoring by quarter: 13–34, 27–35, 11–23, 6–24
Pts: Phouphet 22; Rebs: Phouphet 13; Asts: Kiettisak, Sonepaseud 3		Pts: Sing; Rebs: Tan 11; Asts: 3 players 5

Chan Ka Pho Gymnasium, Krabi
Referees: Prem Kumar Kanneboina (IND), Suebpong Wichaiphin (THA), Michelle Chian Yie Tsen (SGP)

11 June 2026
13:00

FIBA Live Stats

Indonesia	89–35	Laos
Scoring by quarter: 30–13, 17–7, 26–11, 16–4
Pts: Nzekwue 24; Rebs: Nzekwue, Kaihena 9 Asts: Kilapong 7		Pts: Phouphet 15; Rebs: Keovilay 7 Asts: Phouphaxay 2

Chan Ka Pho Gymnasium, Krabi
Referees: Manuel Felix Jr. (PHI), Michelle Chian Yie Tsen (SGP), Watcharin Padungratchadakit (THA)

12 June 2026
13:00

FIBA Live Stats

Malaysia	55–65	Indonesia
Scoring by quarter: 8–19, 27–21, 11–8, 9–17
Pts: Tan 18; Rebs: Tan 11; Asts: Tan, Teng 4		Pts: Bayuntara 21; Rebs: Sebastian 15; Asts: Christiano 15

Chan Ka Pho Gymnasium, Krabi
Referees: Suebpong Wichaiphin (THA), Watcharin Padungratchadakit (THA), Lê Phạm Trung Kiên (VIE)

== Final round ==
=== Championship bracket ===
Semifinals
13 June
Philippines	130
Malaysia	54
13 June
Indonesia	50
Thailand	68

Final
14 June
Philippines	85
Thailand	70
Third place game
14 June
Malaysia	81
Indonesia	70

=== 5th–7th place bracket ===
Fifth place game
13 June
Singapore	112
Laos	44

Sixth place game
14 June
Vietnam	78
Laos	48

=== Fifth place game ===
13 June 2026
13:00

FIBA Live Stats

Singapore	112–44	Laos
Scoring by quarter: 34–8, 25–7, 29–20, 24–9
Pts: J. Ng, Lim 16; Rebs: Leow 10; Asts: Khoh 5		Pts: Chanthanousone, Phouphaxay 10; Rebs: Phouphet 9 Asts: Khamvilay 3

Chan Ka Pho Gymnasium, Krabi
Referees: Watcharin Padungratchadakit (THA), Prem Kumar Kanneboina (IND), Manuel Felix Jr. (PHI)

=== Semifinals ===
13 June 2026
15:30

FIBA Live Stats

Philippines	130–54	Malaysia
Scoring by quarter: 32–11, 26–15, 35–14, 37–14
Pts: Cagurungan 26; Rebs: Espinas 9 Asts: Patagoc 7		Pts: Lim 10; Rebs: Au 6 Asts: Lee 3

Chan Ka Pho Gymnasium, Krabi
Referees: Suebpong Wichaiphin (THA), Lê Phạm Trung Kiên (VIE), Deni Triyanto (INA)

13 June 2026
18:00

FIBA Live Stats

Indonesia	50–68	Thailand
Scoring by quarter: 14–15, 8–17, 11–18, 17–18
Pts: Sebastian 12; Rebs: Sebastian 10; Asts: Christiano 6		Pts: Allsopp 16; Rebs: Thanawat 15; Asts: Peerakan 8

Chan Ka Pho Gymnasium, Krabi
Referees: Li Jin (CHN), Chen Hsin (TPE), Tan Kian Hua (MAS)

=== Sixth place game ===
14 June 2026
13:00

FIBA Live Stats

Vietnam	78–48	Laos
Scoring by quarter: 25–6, 13–4, 15–21, 25–17
Pts: Minh Anh 17; Rebs: Minh Anh 12; Asts: Minh Anh 7		Pts: Phouphet 11; Rebs: Phouphet 13; Asts: 5 players 2

Chan Ka Pho Gymnasium, Krabi
Referees: Deni Triyanto (INA), Manuel Felix Jr. (PHI), Michelle Chian Yie Tsen (SGP)

=== Third place game ===
14 June 2026
15:30

FIBA Live Stats

Malaysia	81–70	Indonesia
Scoring by quarter: 14–19, 22–19, 20–15, 25–17
Pts: Tan 32; Rebs: Tan 10; Asts: Teng 4		Pts: Sebastian 24; Rebs: Sebastian 14; Asts: Christiano 8

Chan Ka Pho Gymnasium, Krabi
Referees: Suebpong Wichaiphin (THA), Chen Hsin (TPE), Prem Kumar Kanneboina (IND)

=== Final ===
14 June 2026
18:00

FIBA Live Stats

Philippines	85–70	Thailand
Scoring by quarter: 19–14, 21–17, 23–26, 22–13
Pts: Tovera 21; Rebs: Moral 7 Asts: Moral 7		Pts: Ravazzini 15; Rebs: Ravazzini 15; Asts: Peerakan 11

Chan Ka Pho Gymnasium, Krabi
Referees: Li Jin (CHN), Tan Kian Hua (MAS), Lê Phạm Trung Kiên (VIE)

== Final standings ==
Rank	Team	Record
1st place, gold medalist(s)	Philippines	5–0
2nd place, silver medalist(s)	Thailand	3–2
3rd place, bronze medalist(s)	Malaysia	2–2
4	Indonesia	2–2
5	Singapore	2–2
6	Vietnam	1–3
7	Laos	0–4

Qualified for the 2026 FIBA U18 Asia Cup
