= 2014 SEABA Under-18 Championship =

2014 SEABA U-18 Championship
9th Southeast Asian Basketball Championship
- Official logo of the 2014 SEABA Under-18 Championship

Tournament details
- Host country: Malaysia
- Dates: May 5–7
- Teams: 4
- Venue(s): 1 (in 1 host city)

Final positions
- Champions: Philippines (7th title)

Tournament statistics
- Top scorer: (Malaysia) Wee J.L. (16.7)
- Top rebounds: (Malaysia) Liew (9.5)
- Top assists: (Philippines) Caracut (Philippines) Asilum (Malaysia) Foo T.J. (4.0)
- PPG (Team): Philippines (105.0)
- RPG (Team): Philippines (55.0)
- APG (Team): Philippines (18.3)

The 2014 SEABA Under-18 Championship was the qualifying tournament for Southeast Asia Basketball Association at the 2014 FIBA Asia Under-18 Championship. The tournament was the ninth edition and was held in Tawau, in Sabah, Malaysia from May 5 to 7. The top two teams represented SEABA in the 2014 FIBA Asia Under-18 Championship.

After the single round-robin elimination, the Philippines won its seventh title overall in the tournament, and its fourth consecutive title since 2008. Malaysia finished second to qualify for the 2014 FIBA Asia Under-18 Championship.

== Round robin ==
Team	Pld	W	L	PF	PA	PD
Philippines	3	3	0	315	174	+141
Malaysia	3	2	1	241	227	+14
Indonesia	3	1	2	161	243	–82
Singapore	3	0	3	199	272	–73

May 5
18:00

Live Stats

Indonesia	35–98	Philippines
Scoring by quarter: 8–23, 5–28, 14–20, 8–27
Pts: Kosasih 10; Rebs: Aziz 8 Asts: 4 players 1		Pts: Go 18; Rebs: Ravena 11; Asts: Asilum 5

Tawau Community Hall, Tawau
Referees: Nattapong Jontapa (THA), Ting Pick Keing (MAS), Tang Wei Kok (SIN)

May 5
20:30

Live Stats

Malaysia	82–74	Singapore
Scoring by quarter: 25–12, 21–16, 15–19, 21–27
Pts: Wong Y.H. 23; Rebs: Liew 10; Asts: Foo T.J. 5		Pts: Han X.Y. 20; Rebs: Lim 10; Asts: Wong Z.H., Kwek, Chia 2

Tawau Community Hall, Tawau
Referees: Yu Jung (TPE), Ricor Buaron (PHI), Erwin Harahap (INA)

May 6
18:00

Live Stats

Singapore	62–66	Indonesia
Scoring by quarter: 14–14, 10–12, 16–23, 22–17
Pts: Lim 12; Rebs: Ang 9 Asts: Sim J.H. 3		Pts: Kosasih 13; Rebs: Kosasih 9 Asts: Tjandra 3

Tawau Community Hall, Tawau
Referees: Yu Jung (TPE), Joenard Garcia (PHI), Chu Wei Chuen (MAS)

May 6
20:00

Live Stats

Philippines	93–76	Malaysia
Scoring by quarter: 18–20, 27–10, 23–30, 25–16
Pts: Tongco 12; Rebs: Ochea 9 Asts: Caracut, Desiderio 4		Pts: Wee J.L. 12; Rebs: Ting C.H. 8 Asts: Foo T.J. 4

Tawau Community Hall, Tawau
Referees: Nattapong Jontapa (THA), Tang Wei Kok (SIN), Erwin Harahap (INA)

May 7
18:00

Live Stats

Singapore	63–124	Philippines
Scoring by quarter: 17–30, 15–43, 18–32, 13–19
Pts: Sim J.H. 15; Rebs: Ang 9 Asts: Wong Z.H. 4		Pts: Desiderio 17; Rebs: Ravena 12; Asts: Caracut, Asilum 5

Tawau Community Hall, Tawau
Referees: Ting Pick Keing (MAS), Erwin Harahap (INA), Chu Wei Chuen (MAS)

May 7
20:00

Live Stats

Malaysia	83–60	Indonesia
Scoring by quarter: 26–15, 15–9, 25–23, 17–13
Pts: Wee J.L. 12; Rebs: Liew 14; Asts: Foo T.J., Wong Y.H., Ting C.H. 3		Pts: Indprasto 12; Rebs: Pangesthio, Kosasih 6 Asts: Teja, Tjandra 3

Tawau Community Hall, Tawau
Referees: Yu Jung (TPE), Nattapong Jontapa (THA), Ricor Buaron (PHI)

== Final standings ==
Qualified for the 2014 FIBA Asia Under-18 Championship

Rank	Team
1st place, gold medalist(s)	Philippines
2nd place, silver medalist(s)	Malaysia
3rd place, bronze medalist(s)	Indonesia
4	Singapore

== Awards ==
2014 SEABA Under-18 champions

Philippines
Seventh title
