= Yemen men's national under-18 basketball team =

Yemen
- FIBA zone: FIBA Asia
- National federation: Yemen Republic Basketball Association

U19 World Cup
- Appearances: None

U18 Asia Cup
- Appearances: 5
- Medals: None

The Yemen men's national under-18 basketball team is a national basketball team of Yemen, administered by the Yemen Republic Basketball Association. It represents the country in international under-18 men's basketball competitions.

== FIBA Under-18 Asia Cup participations ==
Year	Result
2000	13th
2002	11th
2004	14th
2006	10th
2010	6th

== See also ==
- Yemen men's national basketball team
