= China men's national under-19 basketball team =

China
- FIBA zone: FIBA Asia
- National federation: Basketball Association of the People's Republic of China
- Coach: Yizhe Li

U19 World Cup
- Appearances: 14

U18 Asia Cup
- Appearances: 25
- Medals: Gold: 11 (1980, 1986, 1989, 1992, 1996, 1998, 2002, 2006, 2010, 2012, 2014); Silver: 7 (1977, 1978, 1982, 1984, 1995, 2000, 2026); Bronze: 5 (1990, 2004, 2018, 2022, 2024)
Home	Away

The China men's national under-18 and under-19 basketball team is a national basketball team of the People's Republic of China, administered by the Basketball Association of the People's Republic of China. It represents the country in international under-18 and under-19 men's basketball competitions.

As reigning champion of Asia, China achieved the 7th place at the 2013 FIBA Under-19 World Championship. This was the best finish in its history and the best finish ever of an Asian nation at this tournament.

== Tournament record ==
=== FIBA U19 Basketball World Cup ===
Year	Pos.	Pld	W	L
(Brazil) 1979	Did not qualify			
(Spain) 1983	11th	7	4	3
(Italy) 1987	9th	7	3	4
(Canada) 1991	10th	8	3	5
(Greece) 1995	9th	8	4	4
(Portugal) 1999	15th	8	1	7
(Greece) 2003	14th	8	2	6
(Serbia) 2007	12th	8	1	7
(New Zealand) 2009	Did not qualify			
(Latvia) 2011	13th	5	2	3
(Czech Republic) 2013	7th	9	4	5
(Greece) 2015	15th	7	2	5
(Egypt) 2017	Did not qualify			
(Greece) 2019	16th	7	1	6
(Latvia) 2021	Did not qualify			
(Hungary) 2023	10th	7	2	5
(Switzerland) 2025	13th	7	2	5
(Czech Republic) 2027	Qualified			
(Indonesia) 2029	To be determined			
Total	14/19	96	31	65

=== FIBA U18 Asia Cup ===
Year	Result
1970	Did not participate
1972	Did not participate
1974	Did not participate
1977	2nd place, silver medalist(s)
1978	2nd place, silver medalist(s)
1980	1st place, gold medalist(s)
1982	2nd place, silver medalist(s)
1984	2nd place, silver medalist(s)
1986	1st place, gold medalist(s)
1989	1st place, gold medalist(s)
1990	3rd place, bronze medalist(s)
1992	1st place, gold medalist(s)
1995	2nd place, silver medalist(s)
1996	1st place, gold medalist(s)

Year	Result
1998	1st place, gold medalist(s)
2000	2nd place, silver medalist(s)
2002	1st place, gold medalist(s)
2004	3rd place, bronze medalist(s)
2006	1st place, gold medalist(s)
2008	5th
2010	1st place, gold medalist(s)
2012	1st place, gold medalist(s)
2014	1st place, gold medalist(s)
2016	5th
2018	3rd place, bronze medalist(s)
2022	3rd place, bronze medalist(s)
2024	3rd place, bronze medalist(s)
2026	2nd place, silver medalist(s)

== See also ==
- China men's national basketball team
- China men's national under-17 basketball team
- China women's national under-19 basketball team
