= 1986 ABC Under-18 Championship for Women =

1986 FIBA U18 Women's Asia Cup
9th FIBA Under-18 Women's Asian Basketball Championship

Tournament details
- Host country: Philippines
- Dates: December 28, 1986 - January 4, 1987
- Teams: 6
- Venue: 1 (in 1 host city)

Final positions
- Champions: China (4th title)

The 1986 ABC Under-18 Championship for Women was the ninth edition of the Asian Basketball Confederation (ABC)'s Junior Championship for Women. The games were held at Manila, Philippines from December 28, 1986, to January 4, 1987.

== Venue ==
The games were held at Rizal Memorial Coliseum, located in Manila. On April 14, 1984, ABC Executive Committee had a meeting at the Walkerhill Hotel, Seoul and decided to hold the next event at Kuala Lumpur, Malaysia, but later changed to Manila, Philippines.

== Preliminary round ==
Team	Pld	W	L	PF	PA	PD	Pts
China	5	0	0	0	0	0	
South Korea	5	0	0	0	0	0	
Taiwan	5	0	0	0	0	0	
Japan	5	0	0	0	0	0	
Malaysia	5	0	0	0	0	0	
Philippines	5	0	0	0	0	0	

28 December 1986

South Korea	102–67	Taiwan
Scoring by half: 41-28, 61-39

Rizal Memorial Coliseum, Manila

28 December 1986

Japan	97–51	Philippines

Rizal Memorial Coliseum, Manila

28 December 1986

China	120–31	Malaysia

Rizal Memorial Coliseum, Manila

29 December 1986

South Korea	94–70	Japan
Scoring by half: 51-35, 43-35

Rizal Memorial Coliseum, Manila

30 December 1986

China	107–76	South Korea
Scoring by half: 48-34, 59-42

Rizal Memorial Coliseum, Manila

31 December 1986

South Korea	106–50	Malaysia
Scoring by half: 57-21, 49-29

Rizal Memorial Coliseum, Manila

== Final ==
4 January 1987

China	94–70	South Korea
Scoring by half: 41-35, 53-35

Rizal Memorial Coliseum, Manila

== Final standings ==
Rank	Team	
1st place, gold medalist(s)	China	Qualified for the 1989 FIBA Under-19 World Championship for Women
2nd place, silver medalist(s)	South Korea	
3rd place, bronze medalist(s)	Taiwan	
4th	Japan	
5th	Malaysia	
6th	Philippines	

== Awards ==
1986 Asian Under-18 champions

China
Fourth title

== See also ==
- 1986 ABC Under-18 Championship
