= Chaminade College Preparatory School =

Chaminade College Preparatory School may refer to:

- Chaminade College Preparatory School (California), United States
- Chaminade College Preparatory School (Missouri), United States
