= 1986 ABC Under-18 Championship =

1986 FIBA U18 Asia Cup
9th FIBA Under-18 Asian Basketball Championship

Tournament details
- Host country: Philippines
- Dates: December 28, 1986 – January 4, 1987
- Teams: 6
- Venue(s): 1 (in 1 host city)

Final positions
- Champions: China (2nd title)

The 1986 ABC Under-18 Championship was the ninth edition of the Asian Basketball Confederation (ABC)'s Junior Championship. The games were held at Manila, Philippines from December 28, 1986, to January 4, 1987. Taiwan came to Seoul to participate the competition, but withdrew later due to the conflict about using the Chinese flag during the event.

== Venue ==
The games were held at Rizal Memorial Coliseum, located in Manila. On April 14, 1984, ABC Executive Committee had a meeting at the Walkerhill Hotel, Seoul and decided to hold the next event at Kuala Lumpur, Malaysia, but later changed to Manila, Philippines.

== Preliminary round ==
Team	Pld	W	L	PF	PA	PD	Pts
China	5	5	0	0	0	0	
Philippines	5	0	0	0	0	0	
Taiwan	5	0	0	0	0	0	
Japan	5	0	0	0	0	0	
South Korea	5	1	4	0	0	0	0
Hong Kong	5	0	0	0	0	0	0

28 December 1986

Taiwan	98–81	South Korea
Scoring by half: 46-34, 52-47

Rizal Memorial Coliseum, Manila

28 December 1986

China	121–55	Hong Kong

Rizal Memorial Coliseum, Manila

28 December 1986

Philippines	90–83	Japan
Scoring by half: 46-34, 52-47

Rizal Memorial Coliseum, Manila

29 December 1986

Japan	82–79	South Korea
Scoring by half: 39-39, 43-40

Rizal Memorial Coliseum, Manila

30 December 1986

South Korea	90–84	Hong Kong
Scoring by half: 44-41, 46-43

Rizal Memorial Coliseum, Manila

January 1987

China	97–72	South Korea
Scoring by half: 53-29, 44-43

Rizal Memorial Coliseum, Manila

== Final ==
4 January 1987

China	81–67	Philippines
Scoring by half: 40-34, 41-33

Rizal Memorial Coliseum, Manila

== Final standings ==
Rank	Team	Record
1st place, gold medalist(s)	China	
2nd place, silver medalist(s)	Philippines	
3rd place, bronze medalist(s)	Taiwan	
4th	Japan	
5th	South Korea	
6th	Hong Kong	

== Awards ==
1986 Asian Under-18 champions

China
Second title

== See also ==
- 1986 ABC Under-18 Championship for Women
