= 1970 ABC Junior Championship =

1970 FIBA U18 Asia Cup
1st FIBA Under-18 Asian Basketball Championship

Tournament details
- Host country: South Korea
- Dates: August 25–September 2
- Teams: 7 (from all Asian federations)
- Venue: 1 (in 1 host city)

Final positions
- Champions: Philippines (1st title)

The 1970 ABC Junior Championship was the men's division of the inaugural edition of the Asian Basketball Confederation (ABC)'s junior championship or the Asian Youth Basketball Championship. The games were held at the Jangchung Arena in Seoul, South Korea from August 25–September 2, 1970. The age restriction was under 19.

The Philippines won the inaugural championship by sweeping all of their assignments, after beating the hosts South Korea, 106-79, in the final day.

== Results ==
Team	Pld	W	L	Pts
Philippines	6	6	0	12
Japan	6	5	1	11
South Korea	6	4	2	10
Taiwan	6	3	3	9
India	6	2	4	8
Malaysia	6	1	5	7
Singapore	6	0	6	6

August 25

Report

South Korea	104–47	Malaysia
Scoring by half: 47−19, 57−28

Jangchung Arena, Seoul

August 26

Report

Philippines	95–84	Taiwan
Scoring by half: 45-43, 50-41

Jangchung Arena, Seoul

August 26

Report

India	73–119	South Korea
Scoring by half: 34-56, 39-63

Jangchung Arena, Seoul

August 26

Report

Malaysia	62–90	Japan
Scoring by half: 28-49, 34-41

Jangchung Arena, Seoul

August 27

Report

Japan	104–53	Singapore
Scoring by half: 57-20, 47-33

Jangchung Arena, Seoul

August 27

Report

India	84–78	Malaysia
Scoring by half: 38-40, 46-38

Jangchung Arena, Seoul

August 28

Report

Philippines	140–50	Singapore
Scoring by half: 64−22, 76−28

Jangchung Arena, Seoul

August 28

Report

India	78–94	Japan
Scoring by half: 35−39, 43−55

Jangchung Arena, Seoul

August 28

Report

South Korea	106–89	Taiwan
Scoring by half: 45−41, 61−48

Jangchung Arena, Seoul

August 29

Report

Philippines	140–82	India
Scoring by half: 68-36, 72-46

Jangchung Arena, Seoul

August 29

Report

Taiwan	81–96	Japan
Scoring by half: 33−53, 48−43

Jangchung Arena, Seoul

August 29

Report

South Korea	92–48	Singapore
Scoring by half: 43−21, 49−37

Jangchung Arena, Seoul

August 30

Report

Philippines	158–78	Malaysia
Scoring by half: 74−34, 84−44

Jangchung Arena, Seoul

August 30

Report

Singapore	81–103	Taiwan
Scoring by half: 41−47, 40−56

Jangchung Arena, Seoul

August 30

Report

Japan	115–95	South Korea
Scoring by half: 58-47, 57-48

Jangchung Arena, Seoul

September 1

Report1 Report2

Malaysia	85–115	Taiwan
Scoring by half: 55-42, 60-43

Jangchung Arena, Seoul

September 1

Report

Singapore	92–101	India
Scoring by half: 54−52, 38−49

Jangchung Arena, Seoul

September 1

Report

Philippines	126–94	Japan
Scoring by half: 64-53, 62-41

Jangchung Arena, Seoul

September 2

Report

Taiwan	93–86	India
Scoring by half: 43−42, 50−44

Jangchung Arena, Seoul

September 2

Report

Malaysia	95–91	Singapore
Scoring by half: 43−48, 52−43

Jangchung Arena, Seoul

September 2

Report

South Korea	79–106	Philippines
Scoring by half: 49−48, 30−58

Jangchung Arena, Seoul

== Final standing ==
Rank	Team	Record
1st place, gold medalist(s)	Philippines	6–0
2nd place, silver medalist(s)	Japan	5–1
3rd place, bronze medalist(s)	South Korea	4–2
4	Taiwan	3–3
5	India	2–4
6	Malaysia	1–5
7	Singapore	0–6

== Awards ==
1970 Asian Under-18 champions

Philippines
First title

== See also ==
- 1970 ABC Junior Championship for Women
