= FIBA U18 Asia Cup =

Under-18 basketball championship

- Current season, competition or edition: 2026 FIBA U18 Asia Cup
- Formerly: ABC Junior Championship, FIBA Asia Under-18 Championship, FIBA U18 Asian Championship
- Sport: Basketball
- Founded: 1970; 56 years ago
- First season: 1970
- Organizing body: FIBA Asia
- No. of teams: 16
- Countries: FIBA Asia and FIBA Oceania member nations
- Continent: Asia and Oceania
- Most recent champion: Australia (3rd title)
- Most titles: China (11 titles)
- Qualification: FIBA Under-19 Basketball World Cup
- Related competitions: FIBA U16 Asia Cup
- Website: www.fiba.basketball/history

The FIBA U18 Asia Cup, formerly known as the Asian Basketball Confederation Junior Championship, FIBA Asia Under-18 Championship and FIBA U18 Asian Championship, is a biennial international under-18 men's basketball competition organized by FIBA Asia.

The event also serves as a qualification tournament for the FIBA Under-19 Basketball World Cup, where the top four finishers automatically qualify.

== Summary ==
Year	Hosts	Final			Third place match		
Year	Hosts	Champions	Score	Runners-up	Third place	Score	Fourth place
1970; Details	(South Korea); Seoul	Philippines	round-robin	Japan	South Korea	round-robin	Taiwan
1972; Details	(Philippines); Manila	Philippines	round-robin	Taiwan	South Korea	round-robin	India
1974; Details	(Philippines); Manila	Philippines	round-robin	South Korea	Taiwan	round-robin	Thailand
1977; Details	Kuwait City	Philippines	round-robin	China	Kuwait	round-robin	Thailand
1978; Details	(Philippines); Manila	Philippines	round-robin	China	Iraq	round-robin	Japan
1980; Details	(Thailand); Bangkok	China	round-robin	Philippines	Thailand	round-robin	Saudi Arabia
1982; Details	(Philippines); Manila	Philippines	round-robin	China	South Korea	round-robin	Thailand
1984; Details	(South Korea); Seoul	South Korea	round-robin	China	Philippines	round-robin	Japan
1986; Details	(Philippines); Manila	China	81–67	Philippines	Chinese Taipei	round-robin	Japan
1989; Details	(Philippines); Manila	China	89–62	Chinese Taipei	Philippines	?	Japan
1990; Details	(Japan); Nagoya	Japan	82–63	Syria	China	96–93	Philippines
1992; Details	(China); Beijing	China	93–80	South Korea	Philippines	103–74	Japan
1995; Details	(Philippines); Manila	South Korea	55–48	China	Jordan	62–56	Thailand
1996; Details	(Malaysia); Johor Bahru	China	86–71	Qatar	Japan	89–75	South Korea
1998; Details	(India); Kolkata	China	59–45	Qatar	Japan	110–94	Chinese Taipei
2000; Details	(Malaysia); Kuala Lumpur	South Korea	120–92	China	Chinese Taipei	77–76	Japan
2002; Details	Kuwait City	China	81–70	Iran	South Korea	105–88	Qatar
2004; Details	(India); Bangalore	Iran	89–86	South Korea	China	73–63	Lebanon
2006; Details	(China); Urumqi	China	99–83	South Korea	Lebanon	83–60	Chinese Taipei
2008; Details	(Iran); Tehran	Iran	95–76	Kazakhstan	Syria	93–86	Japan
2010; Details	(Yemen); Sana'a	China	103–80	South Korea	Chinese Taipei	65–60	Iran
2012; Details	(Mongolia); Ulaanbaatar	China	93–91	South Korea	Iran	87–83	Japan
2014; Details	(Qatar); Doha	China	66–48	Iran	South Korea	70–58	Chinese Taipei
2016; Details	(Iran); Tehran	Iran	71–65	Japan	South Korea	86–63	Lebanon
2018; Details	(Thailand); Bangkok	Australia	72–63	New Zealand	China	76–57	Philippines
2020	Cancelled due to COVID-19 pandemic in Asia						
2022; Details	(Iran); Tehran	South Korea	77–73	Japan	China	85–68	Lebanon
2024; Details	(Jordan); Amman	Australia	96–33	New Zealand	China	84–63	Jordan
2026; Details	(India); Ahmedabad	Australia	89–79	China	New Zealand	102–97	South Korea
2028; Details	(Indonesia); Jakarta		–			–	

== Medal table ==
Rank	Nation	Gold	Silver	Bronze	Total
1	China	11	7	5	23
2	Philippines	6	2	3	11
3	South Korea	4	6	6	16
4	Iran	3	2	1	6
5	Australia	3	0	0	3
6	Japan	1	3	2	6
7	Chinese Taipei	0	2	4	6
8	New Zealand	0	2	1	3
9	Qatar	0	2	0	2
10	Syria	0	1	1	2
11	Kazakhstan	0	1	0	1
12	Iraq	0	0	1	1
12	Jordan	0	0	1	1
12	Kuwait	0	0	1	1
12	Lebanon	0	0	1	1
12	Thailand	0	0	1	1
Totals (16 entries)		28	28	28	84

== Participation details ==
=== Tournaments 1970–2008 ===
Team	(South Korea) 1970	(Philippines) 1972	(Philippines) 1974	(Kuwait) 1977	(Philippines) 1978	(Thailand) 1980	(Philippines) 1982	(South Korea) 1984	(Philippines) 1986	(Philippines) 1989	(Japan) 1990	(China) 1992	(Philippines) 1995	(Malaysia) 1996	(India) 1998	(Malaysia) 2000	(Kuwait) 2002	(India) 2004	(China) 2006	(Iran) 2008
Australia																				
Bahrain				9th	9th	8th	7th													
Bangladesh						15th								15th	15th					
Brunei													15th							
China				2nd	2nd	1st	2nd	2nd	1st	1st	3rd	1st	2nd	1st	1st	2nd	1st	3rd	1st	5th
Chinese Taipei	4th	2nd	3rd						3rd	2nd	7th	5th	5th	5th	4th	3rd	6th	5th	4th	9th
Hong Kong			7th	12th	10th	13th	11th		6th	16th	8th	8th	13th	11th	10th	6th	12th	6th	16th	12th
India	5th	4th		15th		12th	10th			12th	11th		9th	13th	11th	12th	13th	7th	13th	13th
Indonesia				13th	6th	11th	8th			10th	12th	6th	8th							
Iran			6th	8th	12th		13th			8th	10th	9th		10th	5th	9th	2nd	1st	7th	1st
Iraq					3rd					7th										
Japan	2nd			6th	4th	5th	5th	4th	5th	4th	1st	4th	7th	3rd	3rd	4th	5th	9th	6th	4th
Jordan													3rd	9th						10th
Kazakhstan													10th	12th	6th			8th	5th	2nd
Kuwait				3rd	7th	6th	16th								12th	8th	8th	12th	8th	
Kyrgyzstan																		11th	12th	
Lebanon															13th	10th	9th	4th	3rd	8th
Macau												13th	14th							
Malaysia	6th	7th	5th	5th	8th	9th	6th	5th		11th	6th	11th	11th	8th	8th	11th	10th		14th	15th
Mongolia																				
New Zealand																				
Pakistan				10th						13th					14th					
Philippines	1st	1st	1st	1st	1st	2nd	1st	3rd	2nd	3rd	4th	3rd	6th	6th	7th			13th		7th
Qatar						16th	15th					7th		2nd	2nd	7th	4th	16th		
Saudi Arabia				11th	5th	4th	9th			6th	5th					5th	7th	10th		11th
Singapore	7th	6th	8th	14th	13th	10th	12th	7th		14th		12th	12th	14th		16th		15th	15th	
South Korea	3rd	3rd	2nd	7th		7th	3rd	1st	4th	5th	9th	2nd	1st	4th	9th	1st	3rd	2nd	2nd	6th
Sri Lanka				16th		14th		6th		15th	13th	14th				15th	14th			
Syria											2nd								9th	3rd
Thailand		5th	4th	4th	11th	3rd	4th			9th		10th	4th	7th		14th			11th	
United Arab Emirates						17th	14th													14th
Yemen																13th	11th	14th	10th	
Total	7	7	8	16	13	17	16	7	6	16	13	14	15	15	15	16	14	16	16	15

=== Tournaments 2010–present ===
Team	(Yemen) 2010	(Mongolia) 2012	(Qatar) 2014	(Iran) 2016	(Thailand) 2018	(Iran) 2022	(Jordan) 2024	(India) 2026	(Indonesia) 2028	Total
Australia					1st		1st	1st	Q	4
Bahrain		12th			7th			9th		7
Bangladesh										3
Brunei										1
China	1st	1st	1st	5th	3rd	3rd	3rd	2nd		25
Chinese Taipei	3rd	5th	4th	6th	9th	7th	12th	7th		23
Hong Kong		13th	11th							19
India	13th	10th	13th	8th	11th	9th	8th	12th		23
Indonesia		11th		12th	12th		13th		Q	13
Iran	4th	3rd	2nd	1st	6th	5th	6th	6th		22
Iraq	10th		13th	9th						5
Japan	8th	4th	6th	2nd	5th	2nd	7th	5th		26
Jordan			10th				4th			5
Kazakhstan	11th	15th	8th	10th	13th		14th	14th		13
Kuwait			12th				15th			11
Kyrgyzstan										2
Lebanon	7th	7th		4th	10th	4th	10th	13th		13
Macau										2
Malaysia	12th		7th							20
Mongolia		14th					16th			2
New Zealand					2nd		2nd	3rd		3
Pakistan										3
Philippines	5th	6th	5th	7th	4th	6th	11th	8th		25
Qatar	16th		9th			8th	9th	11th		13
Saudi Arabia	15th	8th								12
Singapore		16th								16
South Korea	2nd	2nd	3rd	3rd	8th	1st	5th	4th		27
Sri Lanka	14th							16th		10
Syria	9th	9th			15th	10th		10th		8
Thailand				11th	14th			15th		15
United Arab Emirates					16th					4
Yemen	6th									5
Total	16	16	14	12	16	10	16	16	16	

== U19 World Cup record ==
Team	(Brazil) 1979	(Spain) 1983	(Italy) 1987	(Canada) 1991	(Greece) 1995	(Portugal) 1999	(Greece) 2003	(Serbia) 2007	(New Zealand) 2009	(Latvia) 2011	(Czech Republic) 2013	(Greece) 2015	(Egypt) 2017	(Greece) 2019	(Latvia) 2021	(Hungary) 2023	(Switzerland) 2025	(Czech Republic) 2027	(Indonesia) 2029	Total
Australia	Part of FIBA Oceania													9th	10th	–	6th	Q		15
China	–	11th	9th	10th	9th	15th	14th	12th	–	13th	7th	15th	–	16th	–	10th	13th	Q		13
Chinese Taipei	–	–	11th	–	–	–	–	–	–	14th	–	–	–	–	–	–	–			2
Indonesia	–	–	–	–	–	–	–	–	–	–	–	–	–	–	–	–	–	–	Q	1
Iran	–	–	–	–	–	–	16th	–	15th	–	11th	14th	15th	–	12th	–	–			6
Japan	–	–	–	16th	–	14th	–	–	–	–	–	–	10th	–	16th	8th	–			5
Jordan	–	–	–	–	16th	–	–	–	–	–	–	–	–	–	–	–	16th			2
Kazakhstan	Part of Soviet Union				–	–	–	–	12th	–	–	–	–	–	–	–	–			1
Lebanon	–	–	–	–	–	–	–	14th	–	–	–	–	–	–	–	15th	–			2
Malaysia	–	–	–	–	–	–	15th	–	–	–	–	–	–	–	–	–	–			1
New Zealand	Part of FIBA Oceania													13th	–	–	4th	Q		3
Philippines	10th	–	–	–	–	–	–	–	–	–	–	–	–	14th	–	–	–			2
Qatar	–	–	–	–	–	10th	–	–	–	–	–	–	–	–	–	–	–			1
South Korea	–	–	–	–	15th	–	12th	11th	–	15th	13th	12th	14th	–	15th	12th	–	Q		9
Syria	–	–	–	12th	–	–	–	–	16th	–	–	–	–	–	–	–	–			2
Total	1	1	2	3	3	3	3	3	3	3	3	3	3	4	4	4	4	4	5	

== See also ==
- FIBA Asia Cup
- FIBA U16 Asia Cup
- FIBA U18 Women's Asia Cup
- FIBA U19 World Cup
