= Singapore men's national under-18 basketball team =

Singapore
- FIBA zone: FIBA Asia
- National federation: Basketball Association of Singapore

U19 World Cup
- Appearances: None

U18 Asia Cup
- Appearances: 16
- Medals: None
Home	Away

The Singapore men's national under-18 basketball team is a national basketball team of Singapore, administered by the Basketball Association of Singapore (BAS), formerly the Singapore Amateur Basketball Association (SABA). It represents the country in international under-18 men's basketball competitions.

== FIBA Under-18 Asia Cup participations ==
Year	Result
1970	7th
1972	6th
1974	8th
1977	14th
1978	13th
1980	10th
1982	12th
1984	7th

Year	Result
1989	14th
1992	12th
1995	12th
1996	14th
2000	16th
2004	15th
2006	15th
2012	16th

== See also ==
- Singapore men's national basketball team
- Singapore men's national under-16 basketball team
- Singapore women's national under-18 basketball team
