= 1996 ABC Under-18 Championship =

1996 FIBA U18 Asia Cup
14th FIBA Under-18 Asian Basketball Championship

Tournament details
- Host country: Malaysia
- Dates: September 1–10
- Teams: 15 (from 44 federations)
- Venue: 1 (in 1 host city)

Final positions
- Champions: China (5th title)

The ABC Under-18 Championship 1996 is the 14th edition of the ABC's junior championship for basketball. The games were held at Johor Bahru, Malaysia from September 1–10, 1996.

== Preliminary round ==
=== Group A ===
Team	Pld	W	L	PF	PA	PD	Pts
South Korea	2	2	0	187	109	+78	4
Malaysia	2	1	1	133	148	−15	3
India	2	0	2	114	177	−63	2

September 1
21:15

Malaysia	78–60	India
Scoring by half: 32–37, 46–23

Majlis Bandaraya Indoor Stadium, Johor Bahru

September 2
12:30

South Korea	99–54	India
Scoring by half: 51–27, 48–27

Majlis Bandaraya Indoor Stadium, Johor Bahru

September 3
19:15

Malaysia	55–88	South Korea
Scoring by half: 31–39, 24–49

Majlis Bandaraya Indoor Stadium, Johor Bahru

=== Group B ===
Team	Pld	W	L	PF	PA	PD	Pts
China	3	3	0	345	167	+178	6
Japan	3	2	1	368	168	+200	5
Kazakhstan	3	1	2	251	253	−2	4
Bangladesh	3	0	3	86	462	−376	3

September 1
10:45

Japan	178–17	Bangladesh
Scoring by half: 90–11, 88–6

Majlis Bandaraya Indoor Stadium, Johor Bahru

September 1
17:45

China	102–59	Kazakhstan
Scoring by half: 54–28, 48–31

Majlis Bandaraya Indoor Stadium, Johor Bahru

September 2
9:00

Bangladesh	27–160	China
Scoring by half: 15–81, 12–79

Majlis Bandaraya Indoor Stadium, Johor Bahru

September 2
19:15

Japan	109–68	Kazakhstan
Scoring by half: 53–40, 56–28

Majlis Bandaraya Indoor Stadium, Johor Bahru

September 3
9:00

Kazakhstan	124–42	Bangladesh
Scoring by half: 59–21, 65–21

Majlis Bandaraya Indoor Stadium, Johor Bahru

September 4
21:00

China	83–81	Japan
Scoring by half: 45–39, 38–42

Majlis Bandaraya Indoor Stadium, Johor Bahru

=== Group C ===
Team	Pld	W	L	PF	PA	PD	Pts
Philippines	3	3	0	258	199	+59	6
Qatar	3	2	1	219	188	+31	5
Jordan	3	1	2	196	201	−5	4
Singapore	3	0	3	170	255	−85	3

September 1
9:00

Singapore	63–83	Philippines
Scoring by half: 34–42, 29–41

Majlis Bandaraya Indoor Stadium, Johor Bahru

September 1
12:30

Qatar	67–40	Jordan
Scoring by half: 33–20, 34–20

Majlis Bandaraya Indoor Stadium, Johor Bahru

September 2
17:30

Jordan	73–83	Philippines
Scoring by half: 37–52, 36–31

Majlis Bandaraya Indoor Stadium, Johor Bahru

September 3
17:30

Qatar	89–56	Singapore
Scoring by half: 45–19, 44–37

Majlis Bandaraya Indoor Stadium, Johor Bahru

September 4
9:00

Jordan	83–51	Singapore
Scoring by half: 50–21, 33–30

Majlis Bandaraya Indoor Stadium, Johor Bahru

September 4
19:15

Philippines	92–63	Qatar
Scoring by half: 54–29, 38–34

Majlis Bandaraya Indoor Stadium, Johor Bahru

=== Group D ===
Team	Pld	W	L	PF	PA	PD	Pts
Chinese Taipei	3	3	0	264	203	+61	6
Thailand	3	2	1	188	193	−5	5
Iran	3	1	2	196	224	−28	4
Hong Kong	3	0	3	203	231	−28	3

September 2
10:45

Hong Kong	75–78	Iran
Scoring by half: 37–40, 38–38

Majlis Bandaraya Indoor Stadium, Johor Bahru

September 2
21:00

Chinese Taipei	91–59	Thailand
Scoring by half: 42–38, 49–21

Majlis Bandaraya Indoor Stadium, Johor Bahru

September 3
10:45

Thailand	61–58	Hong Kong
Scoring by half: 36–19, 25–39

Majlis Bandaraya Indoor Stadium, Johor Bahru

September 3
21:00

Iran	74–81	Chinese Taipei
Scoring by half: 41–50, 33–31

Majlis Bandaraya Indoor Stadium, Johor Bahru

September 4
10:45

Thailand	68–44	Iran
Scoring by half: 33–24, 35–20

Majlis Bandaraya Indoor Stadium, Johor Bahru

September 4
17:30

Chinese Taipei	92–70	Hong Kong
Scoring by half: 46–34, 46–36

Majlis Bandaraya Indoor Stadium, Johor Bahru

== Quarterfinal round ==
=== Group I ===
Team	Pld	W	L	PF	PA	PD	Pts
South Korea	3	3	0	270	215	+55	6
Japan	3	2	1	258	218	+40	5
Philippines	3	1	2	238	279	−41	4
Thailand	3	0	3	211	265	−54	3

September 5
17:30

Japan	80–62	Thailand
Scoring by half: 44–28, 36–34

Majlis Bandaraya Indoor Stadium, Johor Bahru

September 5
21:00

South Korea	93–74	Philippines
Scoring by half: 51–41, 42–33

Majlis Bandaraya Indoor Stadium, Johor Bahru

September 6
17:30

Japan	105–73	Philippines
Scoring by half: 44–40, 61–33

Majlis Bandaraya Indoor Stadium, Johor Bahru

September 6
19:15

South Korea	94–68	Thailand
Scoring by half: 31–32, 63–36

Majlis Bandaraya Indoor Stadium, Johor Bahru

September 7
15:45

South Korea	83–73	Japan
Scoring by half: 37–34, 46–39

Majlis Bandaraya Indoor Stadium, Johor Bahru

September 7
19:15

Philippines	91–81	Thailand
Scoring by half: 50–38, 41–43

Majlis Bandaraya Indoor Stadium, Johor Bahru

=== Group II ===
Team	Pld	W	L	PF	PA	PD	Pts
Qatar	3	3	0	212	178	+34	6
China	3	2	1	253	202	+51	5
Chinese Taipei	3	1	2	207	198	+9	4
Malaysia	3	0	3	163	257	−94	3

September 5
15:45

Qatar	61–41	Chinese Taipei
Scoring by half: 29–19, 32–22

Majlis Bandaraya Indoor Stadium, Johor Bahru

September 5
19:15

Malaysia	46–96	China
Scoring by half: 18–44, 28–52

Majlis Bandaraya Indoor Stadium, Johor Bahru

September 6
15:45

Malaysia	62–67	Qatar
Scoring by half: 30–24, 32–43

Majlis Bandaraya Indoor Stadium, Johor Bahru

September 6
21:00

China	82–72	Chinese Taipei
Scoring by half: 50–37, 32–35

Majlis Bandaraya Indoor Stadium, Johor Bahru

September 7
17:30

Chinese Taipei	94–55	Malaysia
Scoring by half: 48–30, 46–25

Majlis Bandaraya Indoor Stadium, Johor Bahru

September 7
21:00

Qatar	84–75	China
Scoring by half: 42–41, 42–34

Majlis Bandaraya Indoor Stadium, Johor Bahru

=== Group III ===
Team	Pld	W	L	PF	PA	PD	Pts
Jordan	3	3	0	319	187	+132	6
Hong Kong	3	2	1	251	150	+101	5
India	3	1	2	207	194	+13	4
Bangladesh	3	0	3	118	364	−246	3

September 5
9:00

India	89–39	Bangladesh
Scoring by half: 46–21, 43–18

Majlis Bandaraya Indoor Stadium, Johor Bahru

September 5
12:30

Jordan	72–68	Hong Kong
Scoring by half: 37–35, 35–33

Majlis Bandaraya Indoor Stadium, Johor Bahru

September 6
10:45

Hong Kong	66–43	India
Scoring by half: 36–14, 30–29

Majlis Bandaraya Indoor Stadium, Johor Bahru

September 6
12:30

Bangladesh	44–158	Jordan
Scoring by half: 30–84, 14–74

Majlis Bandaraya Indoor Stadium, Johor Bahru

September 7
10:45

Jordan	89–75	India
Scoring by half: 54–39, 35–36

Majlis Bandaraya Indoor Stadium, Johor Bahru

September 7
12:30

Hong Kong	117–35	Bangladesh
Scoring by half: 56–17, 61–18

Majlis Bandaraya Indoor Stadium, Johor Bahru

=== Group IV ===
Team	Pld	W	L	PF	PA	PD	Pts
Iran	2	2	0	180	151	+29	4
Kazakhstan	2	1	1	156	166	−10	3
Singapore	2	0	2	150	169	−19	2

September 5
10:45

Singapore	78–86	Iran
Scoring by half: 41–51, 37–35

Majlis Bandaraya Indoor Stadium, Johor Bahru

September 6
9:00

Kazakhstan	83–72	Singapore
Scoring by half: 43–37, 40–35

Majlis Bandaraya Indoor Stadium, Johor Bahru

September 7
9:00

Kazakhstan	73–94	Iran
Scoring by half: 43–45, 30–49

Majlis Bandaraya Indoor Stadium, Johor Bahru

== Classification 5th–14th ==
=== 13th place ===
September 9
9:00

India	65–50	Singapore
Scoring by half: 33–17, 32–33

Majlis Bandaraya Indoor Stadium, Johor Bahru

=== 11th place ===
September 9
10:45

Hong Kong	74–68	Kazakhstan
Scoring by half: 40–29, 34–39

Majlis Bandaraya Indoor Stadium, Johor Bahru

=== 9th place ===
September 9
14:15

Jordan	69–62	Iran
Scoring by half: 39–30, 30–32

Majlis Bandaraya Indoor Stadium, Johor Bahru

=== 7th place ===
September 10
14:30

Thailand	67–48	Malaysia
Scoring by half: 34–31, 33–17

Majlis Bandaraya Indoor Stadium, Johor Bahru

=== 5th place ===
September 10
16:15

Philippines	69–91	Chinese Taipei
Scoring by half: 32–41, 37–50

Majlis Bandaraya Indoor Stadium, Johor Bahru

== Final round ==
Semifinals
September 9
South Korea	68
China	81
September 9
Japan	54
Qatar	68

Final
September 10
China	86
Qatar	71
3rd place
September 10
South Korea	75
Japan	89

=== Semifinals ===
September 9
19:00

South Korea	68–81	China
Scoring by half: 24–44, 44–37

Majlis Bandaraya Indoor Stadium, Johor Bahru

September 9
20:45

Japan	54–68	Qatar
Scoring by half: 28–29, 26–39

Majlis Bandaraya Indoor Stadium, Johor Bahru

=== 3rd place ===
September 10
18:00

South Korea	75–89	Japan
Scoring by half: 32–47, 43–42

Majlis Bandaraya Indoor Stadium, Johor Bahru

=== Final ===
September 10
19:45

China	86–71	Qatar
Scoring by half: 33–42, 53–29

Majlis Bandaraya Indoor Stadium, Johor Bahru

== Final standing ==
Rank	Team	Record
1st place, gold medalist(s)	China	7–1
2nd place, silver medalist(s)	Qatar	6–2
3rd place, bronze medalist(s)	Japan	5–3
4	South Korea	5–2
5	Chinese Taipei	5–2
6	Philippines	4–3
7	Thailand	3–4
8	Malaysia	1–5
9	Jordan	5–2
10	Iran	3–3
11	Hong Kong	3–4
12	Kazakhstan	2–4
13	India	2–4
14	Singapore	0–6
15	Bangladesh	0–6

== Awards ==
1996 Asian Under-18 champions

China
Fifth title

All-Star Team:

- (China) Wang Zhizhi
- (China) Jin Lipeng
- (Qatar) Yasseen Ismail
- (Japan) Takuma Watanabe
- (South Korea) Jun Hyung-Soo
