= 2026 UST Growling Tigers basketball team =

Philippine college basketball season

2026 UST Growling Tigers men's basketball

Record
- Elims rank: #5
- 2026 record: 6–6
- Head coach: Pido Jarencio (12th season)
- Assistant coaches: Juno Sauler; Peter Martin
- Captain: Mark Llemit (4th season)

The 2026 UST Growling Tigers men's basketball team is representing the University of Santo Tomas in the ongoing 89th season of the University Athletic Association of the Philippines. The men's basketball tournament for the academic year 2026–27 began on September 13, 2026, and the host school for the season is Far Eastern University.

== Roster ==
The roster size has been updated to 17 players this season, with a second foreign student-athlete serving as an alternate and cannot be fielded together with the original FSA on the same play date.

The Growling Tigers presented 18 players for the UAAP media day photo shoot on September 8, 2026. The roster was finalized on September 12, with Filipino American point guard Enzo Abellar getting cut from the official lineup.

UST Growling Tigers roster
Players
Coaches

Pos.	No.	Nat.	Name	Height	Year	High School
PG	0	(Philippines)	Kirk Nuhlan Cañete	5'10" (1.78m)	1st	University of Santo Tomas
C	3	(Nigeria)	Collins Idemudia Akowe	6'10" (2.08m)	2nd	National University Nazareth School
PG	4	(United States)	Donovan Tyler Sevilla	6'0" (1.83m)	5th	Dougherty Valley High School
SF	8	(Philippines)	Hezekiah Charles Bucsit	6'3" (1.91m)	2nd	University of Santo Tomas
PF	10	(Philippines)	Mark Angelo Crisostomo (injured)	6'6" (1.98m)	4th	Sta. Teresita National High School
PG	11	(Philippines)	Prince Ray Alao	6'1" (1.85m)	1st	San Beda University–Rizal
SF	12	(Philippines)	Glenn Isaac Danting	6'2" (1.88m)	3rd	University of the Assumption
SF	14	(Philippines)	Mark Allen Llemit (C)	6'3" (1.91m)	4th	University of Santo Tomas
SF	15	(United States)	Landyn Keola Jumawan	6'4" (1.93m)	5th	Atascocita High School
PF	19	(Philippines)	Koji Ivan Buenaflor	6'6" (1.98m)	2nd	University of Santo Tomas
SG	20	(Philippines)	Leonardo Amiel Acido	6'4" (1.93m)	3rd	University of Perpetual Help
C	24	(Philippines)	Kristian Michael Porter	6'5" (1.96m)	2nd	Ateneo de Manila
SG	25	(Philippines)	Jiro Sevilla	5'11" (1.8m)	2nd	De La Salle Santiago Zobel School
SG	26	(Philippines)	Carl Vincent Manding	6'3" (1.91m)	2nd	University of Santo Tomas
PF	30	(Philippines)	Charles Francis Esteban	6'4" (1.93m)	1st	University of Santo Tomas
C	32	(Nigeria)	Peter Chukwudi Osang	6'7" (2.01m)	1st	Ikorodu
PG	77	(Philippines)	Andrew Xavier Chio	6'0" (1.83m)	1st	Xavier School

Head coach

- (Philippines) Alfredo Lorenzo Jarencio

Assistant coach(es)

- Marco Januz Sauler
- Victor Pedro Martin
- Alvin Grey
- John Paul Cuan
- Juben Ledesma
- Alfredo Jarencio II
- Carlos Joaquin Balingit

Team manager

- Waiyip Chong
- Eric Ang

Legend

- (C) Team captain
- Injured

- [ Roster]

=== Depth chart ===
Pos.	Starting 5	Bench 1	Bench 2	Bench 3
C	Osang
PF	Buenaflor	Esteban
SF	Llemit	Jumawan	Bucsit
SG	Manding	Acido	Danting	J. Sevilla
PG	D. Sevilla	Cañete	Chio	Alao

== Roster changes ==
"Regarding Mark and Amiel, they really are good leaders. And you can see how they've improved, not just in basketball but outside the court as well. They are best suited to lead, because with them, I have fewer problems to worry about."

— Pido Jarencio, Growling Tigers head coach

The Growling Tigers have entered the post-Nic Cabañero era. Their former team captain who was a two-time Mythical team member and a three-time scoring champion has used up his five-year playing eligibility, leaving their veteran holdovers to lead the charge this season. Nigerian big man Collins Akowe, last year's Rookie of the Year and Mythical team awardee is set to team up with the scoring trio of Mark Llemit, Amiel Acido, and Gelo Crisostomo. Llemit succeeded Cabañero as team captain, with Crisostomo serving as co-captain.

The official lineup for UST's 2026 campaign consists of nine holdovers, three rookies, two transferees, two one-and-dones, and an alternate foreign student-athlete. Mur Alao, Kirk Cañete, and Filipino American Donovan Sevilla are among the newcomers tasked to assume point guard duties for the team to replace the already-graduated Forthsky Padrigao and Kyle Paranada. The backcourt duo, considered two of the best point guards in Season 85 combined for nearly half of the team's average of 16.7 assists from the past two seasons.

=== Departures ===
Pos.	No.	Nat.	Player	Height	Year	High school	Notes
SG	1	(United States)	Leland Reuben Estacio	6' 2"	4th	Franklin High School	Graduated
PG	2	(Philippines)	Bevir Ivanne Calum	5' 11"	3rd	St. Louis School–Don Bosco	Relegated to Team B
PG	3	(United States)	Kyle Brandon Paranada	5' 9"	4th	Montgomery High School	Graduated
SF	9	(Philippines)	Nicael Dominie Cabañero	6' 3"	5th	University of Santo Tomas	Graduated
PG	11	(Philippines)	Rence Keith Sean Padrigao	5' 11"	4th	Ateneo de Manila	Graduated
PF	13	(Philippines)	Lorenzo Bangco	6' 4"	1st	University of the East	Relegated to Team B
C	33	(Philippines)	Joachim Eddie Laure	6' 5"	4th	National University Nazareth School	Transferred to University of Perpetual Help

=== Acquisitions ===
Pos.	No.	Nat.	Player	Height	Year	High school	Notes
PG	0	(Philippines)	Kirk Nuhlan Cañete	5' 10"	1st	University of Santo Tomas	Rookie
PG	4	(United States)	Donovan Tyler Sevilla	6' 0"	5th	Dougherty Valley High School	Transferred from Sonoma State University
PG	11	(Philippines)	Prince Ray Alao	6' 1"	1st	San Beda University–Rizal	Transferred from De La Salle University
SF	15	(United States)	Landyn Keola Jumawan	6' 4"	5th	Atascocita High School	Transferred from Northwestern State University
C	24	(Philippines)	Kristian Michael Porter	6' 5"	2nd	Ateneo de Manila	Transferred from Ateneo de Manila University
PF	30	(Philippines)	Charles Francis Esteban	6' 4"	1st	University of Santo Tomas	Rookie
C	32	(Nigeria)	Peter Chukwudi Osang	6' 7"	1st	Ikorodu	Foreign student-athlete
PG	77	(Philippines)	Andrew Xavier Chio	6' 0"	1st	Xavier School	Rookie

=== Recruiting class ===
Name	Pos.	Height	High school	Hometown	Commit date	Ref.
Kristian Porter	C	6' 5"	Ateneo de Manila	Cebu City	8 Jun 2025	
Kristian Porter	2024 NBTC Top 24 rank: 8 (All-Star game participant with Team Heart)					
Kristian Porter	2024 SLAM Rising Stars Classic participant (with Team Hype)					
Kristian Porter	2023 NBTC Top 24 rank: 6 (National Finals #22 seed, Division 2 semifinalist with Ateneo; All-Star game participant with Team Hustle)					
Kristian Porter	2023 SLAM Rising Stars Classic participant (with Team Hype)					
Kirk Cañete	PG	5' 10"	University of Santo Tomas	Malaybalay	14 Apr 2026	
Kirk Cañete	2026 NBTC Top 24 rank: 8 (National Finals #28 seed, Division 1 finalist with UST; All-Star game participant with Team Heart)					
Kirk Cañete	2025 NBTC Top 24 rank: N/A (National Finals #3 seed, Division 1 semifinalist with UST)					
Charles Esteban	PF	6' 4"	University of Santo Tomas	Bacoor	14 Apr 2026	
Charles Esteban	2026 NBTC Top 24 rank: N/A (National Finals #28 seed, Division 1 finalist with UST)					
Charles Esteban	2025 NBTC Top 24 rank: N/A (National Finals #3 seed, Division 1 semifinalist with UST)					
Mur Alao	PG	6' 1"	San Beda University–Rizal	Antipolo	1 Oct 2024	
Mur Alao	2022 SLAM Rising Stars Classic participant (with Team Prep)					
The National Basketball Training Center (NBTC) is a grassroots program in the Philippines that develops and ranks outstanding players from high schools who compete in a five month-long nationwide youth basketball tournament. The program has enabled local coaches to recruit skilled players to play collegiate basketball.
Since 2014, the SLAM Rising Stars Classic holds a yearly exhibition game that serves as a platform to showcase the talents of twenty-four of the best high school players from Metro Manila in front of coaches, scouts and media.

== Schedule and results ==
=== UAAP games ===
Elimination games are played in a double round-robin format. All of UST's games are televised on One Sports and the UAAP Varsity Channel, and livestreamed through the YouTube channel of One Sports and the Cignal Play app.

UAAP Season 89 game log

Elimination round: 6–6
Game	Date • Time	Opponent	Result	Record	High points	High rebounds	High assists	Location
1	Sep 13 • 6:31 pm	UP Fighting Maroons	L 85–92	0–1	Llemit (19)	Akowe (18)	Acido (4)	Araneta Coliseum, Quezon City
2	Sep 16 • 6:08 pm	De La Salle Green Archers	W 80–75	1–1	Acido (19)	Akowe (10)	Acido (7)	Mall of Asia Arena, Pasay
3	Sep 30 • 3:08 pm	UE Red Warriors	W 98–87	2–1	Llemit (22)	Akowe (11)	Acido (5)	Mall of Asia Arena, Pasay
4	Oct 3 • 3:08 pm	Adamson Soaring Falcons	L 57–85	2–2	Akowe (19)	Akowe (15)	Tied (2)	PhilSports Arena, Pasig
5	Oct 10 • 3:09 pm	NU Bulldogs	L 85–87^{OT}	2–3	Jumawan (22)	Tied (9)	Acido (6)	Araneta Coliseum, Quezon City
6	Oct 14 • 3:08 pm	FEU Tamaraws	W 81–69	3–3	Llemit (18)	Akowe (19)	Llemit (6)	Araneta Coliseum, Quezon City
7	Oct 17 • 6:15 pm	Ateneo Blue Eagles; End of R1 of eliminations	W 80–68	4–3	Akowe (18)	Akowe (15)	Cañete (5)	Quadricentennial Pavilion, Manila
8	Oct 21 • 5:55 pm	UP Fighting Maroons	L 101–103^{2OT}	4–4	Llemit (33)	Akowe (18)	Cañete (5)	Mall of Asia Arena, Pasay
9	Oct 25 • 6:09 pm	De La Salle Green Archers	L 80–92	4–5	Acido (20)	Akowe (14)	Llemit (9)	Blue Eagle Gym, Quezon City
10	Oct 31 • 2:30 pm	NU Bulldogs	L 71–75	4–6	Acido (13)	Porter (6)	Porter (6)	Araneta Coliseum, Quezon City
11	Nov 8 • 5:23 pm	FEU Tamaraws	W 86–85	5–6	Acido (23)	Akowe (12)	Akowe (3)	Araneta Coliseum, Quezon City
12	Nov 11 • 2:43 pm	UE Red Warriors	W 97–70	6–6	Acido (22)	Osang (10)	Acido (5)	Araneta Coliseum, Quezon City

(#) Tournament seedings in parentheses.
All times are in UTC+08:00 Philippine Standard Time.
Source: Livestats.ph

=== Preseason tournaments ===
The NSAC games were televised on One Sports, One Sports+, and Solar Sports, and were livestreamed through the YouTube channel and Facebook page of AsiaBasket, as well as on the Pilipinas Live app. The Filoil EcoOil Preseason Cup games were livestreamed on the Facebook pages of Filoil EcoOil Sports and Smart Sports, and Filoil EcoOil Sports' YouTube channel.

Preseason game log

2026 PinoyLiga Global Invitational Cup : 2–1
Game	Date • Time	Opponent	Result	Record	High points	High rebounds	High assists	Location
1	Feb 20 • 10:00 am	JRU Heavy Bombers	W 83–82	1–0	Buenaflor (21)	Akowe (8)	Tied (6)	St. Vincent Gym, Manila
2	Feb 21 • 7:30 pm	Adamson Soaring Falcons	W 76–64	2–0	Tied (17)	Akowe (13)	Acido (5)	Enderun Colleges Gym, Taguig
3	Feb 22 • 4:00 pm	Tokai University Seagulls; Championship game	L 77–80	2–1	Akowe (24)	Akowe (13)	Akowe (4)	Enderun Colleges Gym, Taguig

2026 Mayor Alvin Otaza Invitational Basketball Tournament : 0–4
Game	Date • Time	Opponent	Result	Record	High points	High rebounds	High assists	Location
1	Mar 28 • 9:00 am	De La Salle Green Archers	L 47–49	0–1	Akowe (21)	Akowe (16)	Akowe (3)	Umajam Dome, Loreto, Agusan del Sur
2	Mar 29 • 11:00 am	UP Fighting Maroons	L 75–82	0–2	Akowe (17)	Akowe (16)	Tied (3)	Umajam Dome, Loreto, Agusan del Sur
3	Mar 29 • 4:00 pm	Adamson Soaring Falcons	L 77–78^{OT}	0–3	Akowe (27)	Akowe (9)	Llemit (6)	Umajam Dome, Loreto, Agusan del Sur
4	Mar 30 • 11:00 am	Dave Construction	L 88–91	0–4	Porter (14)	Porter (9)	Suico (8)	Umajam Dome, Loreto, Agusan del Sur

2026 U-Belt Collegiate Invitational : 5–5
Game	Date • Time	Opponent	Result	Record	High points	High rebounds	High assists	Location
1	Apr 18 • 3:00 pm	St. Clare College Saints	W 83–64	1–0	Llemit (16)	Porter (9)	Suico (4)	San Beda University Gym, Manila
2	Apr 23 • 11:00 am	Adamson Soaring Falcons	L 67–73	1–1	Osang (13)	Osang (13)	Alao (3)	Arellano University Taft Gym, Pasay
3	Apr 28 • 1:00 pm	JRU Heavy Bombers	L 77–79	1–2	Llemit (16)	Osang (10)	Tied (4)	Arellano University Taft Gym, Pasay
4	May 1 • 3:00 pm	Fatima Phoenix	W 85–79	2–2	Tied (20)	Tied (7)	Alao (4)	Arellano University Taft Gym, Pasay
5	May 9 • 1:00 pm	FEU Tamaraws	W 94–75	3–2	Calum (15)	Osang (10)	Cañete (6)	FEU Diliman Sports Center, Quezon City
6	May 10 • 10:00 am	Letran Knights	W 84–77	4–2	Osang (21)	Osang (15)	Tied (3)	University of Perpetual Help Gym, Las Piñas
7	May 19 • 1:00 pm	Benilde Blazers	L 65–73	4–3	Calum (16)	Osang (11)	Tied (3)	Arellano University Taft Gym, Pasay
8	May 27 • 3:00 pm	San Beda Red Lions; Quarterfinal game	W 75–52	5–3	Acido (18)	Porter (7)	Tied (3)	Arellano University Taft Gym, Pasay
9	May 29 • 9:00 am	JRU Heavy Bombers; Semifinal game	L 82–85^{OT}	5–4	Osang (24)	Osang (8)	Acido (4)	Arellano University Taft Gym, Pasay
10	Jun 4 • 10:00 am	San Beda Red Lions; Battle for third place	L 66–80	5–5	Porter (12)	Porter (15)	Cañete (6)	Rizal Memorial Coliseum, Manila

2026 National Students Athletic Championship Campus Tour : 7–0
Game	Date • Time	Opponent	Result	Record	High points	High rebounds	High assists	Location
1	Apr 19 • 12:00 pm	NU Bulldogs	W 75–68	1–0	Acido (21)	Acido (8)	Acido (4)	Blue Eagle Gym, Quezon City
2	Apr 25 • 2:00 pm	Perpetual Altas	W 80–57	2–0	Osang (16)	Tied (9)	Tied (4)	UP Varsity Training Center, Quezon City
3	Apr 26 • 9:00 am	San Sebastian Stags	W 102–63	3–0	Acido (15)	Tied (9)	Alao (5)	UP Varsity Training Center, Quezon City
4	May 10 • 3:00 pm	St. Clare College Saints; Round of 16	W 87–55	4–0	Akowe (21)	Crisostomo (11)	Tied (3)	UP Varsity Training Center, Quezon City
5	May 23 • 12:00 pm	Ateneo Blue Eagles; Quarterfinal game	W 86–84	5–0	Llemit (21)	Llemit (9)	Crisostomo (7)	Enrique M. Razon Sports Center, Manila
6	May 30 • 4:00 pm	De La Salle Green Archers; Semifinal game	W 115–107^{OT}	6–0	Acido (33)	Crisostomo (12)	Crisostomo (9)	Blue Eagle Gym, Quezon City
7	May 31 • 4:30 pm	NU Bulldogs; Championship game	W 95–84	7–0	Llemit (27)	Akowe (11)	Acido (5)	Blue Eagle Gym, Quezon City

2026 19th Filoil EcoOil Preseason Cup : 3–4
Game	Date • Time	Opponent	Result	Record	High points	High rebounds	High assists	Location
1	May 17 • 2:00 pm	UP Fighting Maroons	L 78–82	0–1	Llemit (22)	Akowe (16)	Tied (4)	Filoil Centre, San Juan
2	May 20 • 5:00 pm	De La Salle Green Archers	L 78–79	0–2	Tied (16)	Akowe (13)	Tied (3)	Filoil Centre, San Juan
3	Jun 6 • 3:00 pm	FEU Tamaraws	W 83–75	1–2	Crisostomo (22)	Akowe (11)	Alao (4)	Filoil Centre, San Juan
4	Jun 9 • 5:00 pm	Adamson Soaring Falcons	W 81–59	2–2	Buenaflor (11)	Porter (8)	Tied (3)	Filoil Centre, San Juan
	Jun 16 • 5:00 pm	Ateneo Blue Eagles	Canceled due to Ateneo's withdrawal from the tournament					Filoil Centre, San Juan
5	Jun 18 • 3:00 pm	NU Bulldogs	L 74–90	2–3	Buenaflor (14)	Crisostomo (9)	Crisostomo (4)	Filoil Centre, San Juan
6	Jun 23 • 5:00 pm	Gilas U-18 Team	W 99–91	3–3	Akowe (18)	Akowe (9)	Cañete (8)	Filoil Centre, San Juan
7	Jul 10 • 1:00 pm	Letran Knights; Quarterfinal game	L 102–103^{OT}	3–4	Acido (20)	Osang (10)	Acido (6)	Filoil Centre, San Juan

2026 PinoyLiga Collegiate Cup : 4–2
Game	Date • Time	Opponent	Result	Record	High points	High rebounds	High assists	Location
1	Jun 7 • 3:00 pm	EAC Generals	L 82–92	0–1	Danting (27)	Esteban (8)	Cañete (8)	Enderun Colleges Gym, Taguig
2	Jun 20 • 3:00 pm	Adamson Soaring Falcons	W 69–62	1–1	Danting (16)	Kane (12)	Alao (9)	Enderun Colleges Gym, Taguig
3	Jun 28 • 5:00 pm	Benilde Blazers	W 89–77	2–1	Kane (19)	Kane (12)	Cañete (4)	Enderun Colleges Gym, Taguig
4	Jul 4 • 1:00 pm	JRU Heavy Bombers	W 60–59	3–1	Jumawan (21)	Jumawan (9)	Dela Cruz (4)	Enderun Colleges Gym, Taguig
5	Jul 11 • 11:00 am	Bestlink College Kalasag	W 112–107^{OT}	4–1	Osang (27)	Osang (15)	Cañete (6)	Enderun Colleges Gym, Taguig
6	Jul 18 • 5:00 pm	Adamson Soaring Falcons; Group knockout stage	L 67–68	4–2	Tied (16)	Osang (12)	Alao (5)	Enderun Colleges Gym, Taguig

2026 AisaBasket NSAC World Invitational : 2–1
Game	Date • Time	Opponent	Result	Record	High points	High rebounds	High assists	Location
1	Aug 14 • 3:00 pm	Tenri University Penguins	W 88–65	1–0	Tied (17)	Akowe (9)	Jumawan (5)	PhilSports Arena, Pasig
2	Aug 15 • 3:00 pm	JRU Heavy Bombers; Semifinal game	W 97–92^{OT}	2–0	Akowe (33)	Akowe (22)	Jumawan (5)	PhilSports Arena, Pasig
3	Aug 16 • 5:00 pm	Fighting Eagles Nagoya; Championship game	L 91–92	2–1	Tied (20)	Akowe (12)	Acido (8)	PhilSports Arena, Pasig

2026 PinoyLiga The Big Dance : 4–0
Game	Date • Time	Rank	Opponent	Result	Record	High points	High rebounds	High assists	Location
1	Aug 23 • 12:00 pm	(#1)	(#16) UMak Herons; Round of 16	W 92–55	1–0	Manding (16)	Tied (8)	Cañete (4)	Blue Eagle Gym, Quezon City
2	Aug 29 • 5:00 pm	(#1)	(#8) Lyceum Pirates; Quarterfinal game	W 77–73	2–0	Jumawan (17)	Acido (9)	Acido (7)	Blue Eagle Gym, Quezon City
3	Aug 31 • 4:00 pm	(#1)	(#21) Ateneo Blue Eagles; Semifinal game	W 76–68	3–0	Akowe (21)	Tied (6)	Cañete (5)	Blue Eagle Gym, Quezon City
4	Sep 3 • 5:30 pm	(#1)	(#22) CEU Scorpions; Championship game	W 81–60	4–0	Akowe (17)	Buenaflor (8)	Llemit (6)	Filoil Centre, San Juan

(#) Tournament seedings in parentheses.
All times are in UTC+08:00 Philippine Standard Time.
Sources: PinoyLiga, FilBasket, Statshub Philippines

== Player statistics ==
=== UAAP ===
Player	GP	GS	MPG	FGM	FGA	FG%	3PM	3PA	3P%	FTM	FTA	FT%	RPG	APG	SPG	BPG	TOV	PPG
Peter Osang	1	1	28.4	7	10	70.0	0	0	0.0	5	11	45.5	10.0	0.0	2.0	5.0	2.0	19.0
Amiel Acido	12	2	29.7	61	140	43.6	32	83	38.6	42	48	87.5	5.4	3.4	1.1	0.0	2.2	16.3
Mark Llemit	12	11	29.9	66	146	45.2	17	47	36.2	41	48	85.4	6.3	2.9	1.1	0.4	2.5	15.8
Collins Akowe	11	11	34.0	57	117	48.7	1	3	33.3	45	72	62.5	13.2	2.5	0.5	1.3	3.3	14.5
Landyn Jumawan	12	4	25.4	46	123	37.4	30	87	34.5	13	18	72.2	3.5	1.8	1.3	0.1	1.7	11.3
Koji Buenaflor	12	9	19.9	32	79	39.2	4	22	18.2	10	19	52.6	3.5	0.7	0.2	0.7	1.2	6.3
Kirk Cañete	12	7	18.0	18	47	38.3	5	25	20.0	20	28	71.4	2.2	2.3	0.8	0.0	1.4	5.1
Andrew Chio	10	0	13.0	15	40	37.5	10	30	33.3	2	2	100.0	0.6	1.2	0.2	0.0	0.7	4.2
Donovan Sevilla	6	4	12.0	8	24	33.3	2	9	22.2	1	2	50.0	1.2	1.7	0.0	0.3	0.5	3.2
Ice Danting	11	4	8.0	10	33	30.3	8	23	34.8	7	9	77.8	1.0	0.4	0.2	0.1	0.5	3.2
Charles Esteban	11	1	8.0	9	26	34.6	4	13	30.8	4	6	66.7	1.5	0.3	0.2	0.3	0.5	2.4
Kristian Porter	10	0	8.4	7	21	33.3	3	14	21.4	6	9	66.7	2.5	1.1	0.4	0.2	0.4	2.3
Gelo Crisostomo	2	1	6.2	1	3	33.3	0	0	0.0	0	0	0.0	0.5	0.0	0.5	0.0	0.5	1.0
Jiro Sevilla	3	0	4.0	1	6	16.7	1	6	16.7	0	0	0.0	0.3	0.0	0.0	0.0	0.0	1.0
Carl Manding	8	2	4.3	2	3	66.7	0	0	0.0	3	7	42.9	1.1	0.3	0.3	0.0	0.3	0.9
Charles Bucsit	5	2	4.1	1	5	20.0	0	4	0.0	1	2	50.0	1.0	0.0	0.0	0.0	0.6	0.5
Mur Alao	9	1	6.4	2	15	13.3	0	10	0.0	0	0	0.0	0.4	0.9	0.4	0.0	0.4	0.4
Total	12		41.3	342	838	40.8	121	376	32.2	200	282	70.9	46.5	17.5	6.5	3.5	15.8	83.4
Opponents	12		41.3	364	896	40.6	106	357	29.7	154	210	73.3	42.0	16.7	8.3	3.9	11.8	82.3

Legend
GP	Games played	GS	Games started	MPG	Minutes per game
FGM	Field-goal made	FGA	Field-goal attempts	FG%	Field-goal percentage
3PM	3-point field-goal made	3PA	3-point field-goal attempts	3P%	3-point field-goal percentage
FTM	Free-throw made	FTA	Free-throw attempts	FT%	Free-throw percentage
RPG	Rebounds per game	APG	Assists per game	SPG	Steals per game
BPG	Blocks per game	TOV	Turnovers per game	PPG	Points per game

Source: Livestats.ph

== Summary of games ==
=== First round ===
UP Fighting Maroons

	1	2	3	4	Total
UST	22	26	14	23	85
UP	24	20	22	26	92

An 85–92 loss against the UP Fighting Maroons greeted the Growling Tigers at the start of their Season 89 campaign. The entire game had multiple lead changes with players from both teams displaying a high level of physicality. UP had threatened to break away in the first quarter after a triple by Miguel Yniguez pushed his team ahead with a six-point, 20–14 lead. UST gained momentum midway in the quarter with Ice Danting drilling in back-to-back three-pointers, followed by a basket by Koji Buenaflor to keep the Tigers within two, at 22–24 at the end of the period. Co-captain Gelo Crisostomo had an injury scare early in the game after stepping on a slippery portion of the floor while attempting to drive to the basket.

The Fighting Maroons were able to mount a ten-point, 32–22 advantage in the second period, but the Tigers rallied back with a 21–6 run as they forced turnovers and scored on fastbreaks behind the efforts of Mark Llemit, Amiel Acido, and Buenaflor to end the half with a four-point, 48–44 lead.

The Tigers had a slow start in the second half and were only able to score in spurts. They had managed to maintain a nine-point, 55–46 cushion after a Collins Akowe basket with under seven minutes left in the third period, but a series of missed attempts followed, allowing their opponents to catch up. UP's James Payosing scored on a putback from teammate Veejay Pre's missed three-point shot to spark a 15–5 run. A triple by Arvie Poyos tied the count at 60–all. Poyos and Sean Alter teamed up to seize the lead from the Tigers to end the quarter at 66–62.

The last 13 minutes of the game saw the Tigers playing catch-up as the Maroons pulled away with a nine-point, 71–62 lead. UP's Noy Remogat, shooting for only 3-of-13 in the first three quarters of the game poured eight of his total output in the last four minutes, including back-to-back triples to increase the Maroons' lead from 5 to 11 points, at 88–77. UST was only able to score four points against UP's 13 from a 25–7 run in the final stretch until the buzzer sounded.

The Maroons' defense in the second half caused the Tigers to shoot poorly as they ended the game with only a 39.2 percent clip. UST's bench also paled in comparison with UP's depth with a 24–45 scoring disparity. The Tigers relied heavily on their starters, with Llemit, Acido, and Akowe scoring 50 of the team's total points. Akowe had a double-double of 13 points and a game high of 18 rebounds, but the team ended up getting outrebounded, 39–45.

	1	2	3	4	Total
UST	24	21	16	19	80
La Salle	16	24	16	19	75

De La Salle Green Archers

"This was a team effort. I commend our coaches because they went deep in our game plan. They scouted each player. Last game's loss was a lesson for us. It was a good wake-up call and it was good that it happened early, during the first game of the season."

— Pido Jarencio

The Growling Tigers bounced back from their opening day loss by taking down reigning champions De La Salle Green Archers, 80–75 in their first round meeting. Fending off a 13-point comeback by the Archers, UST was able to hang on to their lead in the final quarter, with Acido and Akowe coming up with crucial plays to secure the win.

The Archers were able to contain Akowe at the post with Luis Pablo and Mason Amos alternating on defense, but Acido's perimeter sniping set an early pace for the Tigers. Substituting for the injured Crisostomo, Buenaflor completed a three-point play to give the Tigers an eight-point, 24–16 cushion at the end of the first quarter.

Fellow forward Charles Esteban continued the task as he scored four straight points to counter baskets made by La Salle's Jacob Cortez and JC Macalalag, while maintaining UST's eight-point lead at 28–20. Defensive stops by Cortez and former Tiger Cub Doy Dungo brought down the Tigers' lead to three, at 40–37, but Acido answered with a triple and a layup to close out the half and keep the team in command at 45–40.

La Salle was able to catch up in the third quarter, after their trapping defense forced UST to commit turnovers. Earl Abadam and Vhoris Marasigan capitalized on their transition offense, which brought the Archers to a 51–all tie with under three minutes left.

Akowe's undergoal stab against La Salle's Mo Kulang pushed UST ahead with a nine-point, 72–63 lead midway in the final period, but they soon fell prey to a 7–0 run by the Archers. Lapses in their defense sent Cortez and Pablo to the line, with the two making 7-of-8 free throws and allowed them to come within two, at 70–72. Llemit was able to stop the rally after scoring on a drive against Amos' outstretched arms to extend the Tigers' lead at 74–70.

La Salle's Macalalag connected with a triple from the corner at the 1:27 mark and trimmed down UST's lead to one, at 74–73. A series of botched plays from both teams followed, with Akowe committing a crucial turnover that allowed the Archers to steal the ball. The sophomore center made up for his error by scoring a tough undergoal play against Pablo with 25 seconds remaining in the game. He next made a defensive stop against Cortez, who was side stepping for a lay-in. Acido was able to collar the rebound and was subsequently fouled by Macalalag. He sank both his penalty shots to give the Tigers a five-point, 78–73 advantage. In the ensuing play, a goaltending violation was called on Akowe after he tried to block Macalalag's layup, giving La Salle a glimmer of hope as they inched closer with a single-possession deficit at 75–78 with 9.7 seconds remaining. The Archers fouled Acido during the inbound in an attempt to stop the clock, but the third year wing calmly made both shots from the line to seal UST's win.

Acido led the Tigers with 19 points, 7 rebounds and a team-high 7 assists. He also had a perfect 7-of-7 free throw shooting as Akowe had another double-double, scoring 18 points and hauling down 10 rebounds.

	1	2	3	4	Total
UE	19	14	28	26	87
UST	24	28	23	23	98

UE Red Warriors

The Tigers weathered a fourth quarter uprising by the UE Red Warriors and came away with a 98–87 win over them to record a two-game streak early in the season and kept their opponents winless for the 24th game since 2024.

UST struggled to score at the start of the game and found themselves trailing the Warriors before Acido came off the bench to score seven straight points in the middle of a 10–0 rally. The Tigers ended the first period ahead at 24–19. UE opened the second quarter with four unanswered points. It was when rookie Andrew Chio, seeing action for the first time in three games was sent in and instantly scored back-to-back threes to lead an 8–0 counterattack for a 32–23 separation. UST stayed ahead for the remainder of the period and went into halftime with a 19-point, 52–33 cushion, as the Tigers outscored their opponents 28–14. Llemit scored nearly half of the team's output in the quarter with 12 points.

"They (UE) are zero and three, but they know how to play, and they just replaced their coach so their players would want to show what they got in front of their new coach. We saw that in the second half when they gained momentum. As for us, we were still able to keep our endgame poise and we got the win, eventually. It may not be a big lead, even if it was one, two, or only three points, as long as we won, it's okay with us."

— Pido Jarencio

UST led for multiple times in the game, which went as high as 23 points, but the Warriors made a 16–8 run in the final period to come within ten, at 73–83. Back-to-back layups by UE's Cole Cruz-Dumont sparked another 7–3 rally, which was capped by a triple from teammate Toper Lagat to make the count 86–80, still in UST's favor. A basket by Landyn Jumawan and a split free throw by Akowe put the Tigers back up with a nine-point, 89–80 cushion. Llemit and UE's Gene Carillo traded threes to increase the score, with three minutes left on the clock before Akowe made his own baskets to put the game away.

The Tigers struggled in the fourth quarter when the Warriors' defense started to work. UST ended up committing 20 turnovers as UE capitalized to score 32 transition points. In the end, the Tigers regained their composure to secure the win. Llemit, coming back from an off-game in their match against La Salle powered the team with a 22-point effort on a 61 percent field goal percentage. Acido scored 16 points with a 7-of-10 shooting accuracy. Akowe finished with another double-double of 14 points and 11 rebounds on top of six shot blocks, while Jumawan contributed 13 points with three triples.

	1	2	3	4	Total
Adamson	19	17	18	31	85
UST	12	11	16	18	57

Adamson Soaring Falcons

The Growling Tigers suffered a 57–85 blowout loss at the hands of the Adamson Soaring Falcons. The Falcons continued to be a difficult puzzle to solve for the Tigers as they were once again stopped in their tracks after stringing together two straight wins in the tournament. Their head-to-head record in the post-pandemic era stands at 8–3, in favor of Adamson.

The game started with Ice Danting making a three-point play on a converted layup from an assist by Acido, which was countered by Adamson's Mathew Montebon's triple for a 3–all score. A three by Buenaflor and a couple of free throws by Akowe gave the Tigers an 8–3 advantage. The Falcons answered with a 16–4 run that was capped by a layup from Adamson's Precious Jonah to end the period at 19–12. Montebon fired a three-pointer to start another rally with a 10–6 exchange that ended with an unlikely triple from teammate Kobe Demisana to end the half with a 36–23 Falcons lead.

UST fell to their largest deficit at 23 points when Montebon hit another three with under five minutes remaining in the third period. Acido converted three consecutive free throws to trim down the opponent's big lead, as they went for their own 12–0 rally to come within 11, at 39–50. Montebon's two free throws and Mahathir Edding's layup halted UST's run as they continued to trail, 39–54 at the end of the quarter. Matty Erolon and Earl Medina combined for five triples to increase the Falcons' lead to 25, at 80–55 with two minutes left in the game.

Adamson has been known to keep a grinding pace with their tough defense on their opponents that result to low-scoring records, but while they were able to force the Tigers to commit 20 turnovers and limit them to 30 points below their scoring average, the Falcons found success in converting their field goals and ended up with a score that was higher than usual. UST ended up shooting for only 20-of-63 for a 31.7 percent clip, with their three-point shooting going for only 8.3 percent with a 2-of-24 conversion.

Akowe led the team with another double-double of 19 points and 15 rebounds, with Acido adding 11 with a perfect 7-of-7 free throw shooting. Llemit once again struggled, going 1-of-6 from the field to finish with only 2 points.

	1	2	3	4	OT	Total
NU	23	18	23	13	10	87
UST	15	12	24	26	8	85

NU Bulldogs

A last-second three-pointer by Reinhard Jumamoy prevented the Growling Tigers from completing a comeback as they yielded a two-point, 85–87 overtime loss against the NU Bulldogs. The game began with the Tigers trading lead changes with NU, as starters Akowe, Acido, Jumawan, and rookie Charles Esteban each scored a basket to tie the score at 8–all. Mark Llemit came in to substitute for Jumawan and immediately made a layup for a 10–all count before the Bulldogs went on a 13–5 run that began with a triple from Jumamoy. The first quarter ended with UST trailing by eight, at 15–23. The Tigers continued to struggle offensively in the next period, as they shot for only 26 percent and missed all of their nine three-point attempts. They managed to score only 12 points as the half ended with a bigger deficit of 14, at 27–41.

UST employed a zone defense in the second half to limit NU's scoring. Even as the lead ballooned to its largest at 15, at 31–46, the Tigers made a slow and improbable comeback. They were able to match the Bulldogs' output in the third period as they scored 24 points against their opponent's 23. They made 8-of-16 baskets for a 50 percent shooting clip. They also forced NU to miss their last four attempts in the last minute of the quarter.

The fourth quarter started with back-to-back turnovers by the Bulldogs, as the Tigers forced an offensive foul against Kenshin Padrones and a passing error by Jumamoy. Trailing by 13, at 51–64, UST began to chip away at NU's lead with a triple from Jumawan, from an assist by Acido. Llemit scored four straight points from a couple of free throws and a layup to get the Tigers closer at 58–66. It was Acido's turn to score four consecutive points when he made 1-of-2 free throws, followed by a three-pointer from a transition fastbreak to pull UST to within four, at 62–66. The Bulldogs' lead went up again to nine at 77–68 with two minutes remaining after Padrones made both of his free throws. The two veteran leaders once again teamed up to power the Tigers to a 9–0 run, with Acido's back-to-back threes, and Llemit's clutch shooting at the charity line. Down by three at 74–77, with 44 seconds remaining in regulation, Llemit grabbed the offensive rebound from Jumawan's missed three-pointer. He was fouled by NU's Macmac Alfanta and made one-of-two penalty shots for a 75–77 score. With 16 seconds remaining, Jumawan was able to force a turnover on PJ Palacielo, and with three seconds left, Llemit forced his way to the basket and got Palacielo's fifth and final foul. Palacielo, who led NU in scoring along with Jumamoy scored all of his team's first 10 points but had to sit out for long stretches due to foul trouble. Llemit made both free throws amid distractions from the crowd behind the basket to tie the score at 77–all and send the game to overtime. UST held the Bulldogs to only 13 points as Acido and Llemit scored 17 of the team's 26-point output.

"Yes, these type of losses really hurt, because you don't expect that kind of shot to go in, which is why it is called a 'Hail Mary.' In my mind, I kept saying, 'Please don't go in,' but the result still went in their favor. I don't want to go through a loss like that again because the memory haunts you. We must move on from this, because the tournament does not end here. It's not even the end of the first round (of eliminations) yet, so there's still time to correct our lapses and work on our decision-making. It always starts at practice, the things that we need to put our focus on as we look forward to bring out the fight in each of us in our next games."

— Amiel Acido

The one-and-done Jumawan took over in the extra period as he drilled in two triples and made two baskets at the stripe. With under three minutes left, his triple tied the game at 80–all, and then as the Tigers forced a shot clock violation on the Bulldogs with a minute left, Jumawan fired another three to give the team the lead, at 83–82. He was next fouled while attempting a three and went 2-for-3 to overturn their one-point deficit to their advantage at 85–84 with 35 seconds remaining. They made another defensive stop when they forced Jumamoy to miss from the arc. Akowe was subbed out in favor of Kirk Cañete, who was fouled by the Bulldogs' DJ Laconsay at the 15-second mark to stop the clock. Akowe was sent back in for rebounding duty, as the rookie point guard uncharacteristically missed both of his penalty shot attempts. The ball went into NU's possession as they raced down for a field goal. Akowe was able to deny Jumamoy's three-point attempt with a block with the ball going out of bounds in the Bulldogs' favor, 5.3 seconds remaining. NU called a timeout to set up a half-court play. The Tigers were doing a good job in denying NU's receivers of the inbound until the ball went into Jumamoy's hands. Llemit was tasked to guard the Bulldogs' point guard, who dribbled from near midcourt towards the top of the three-point arc. Jumamoy made a quick step back to create space between himself and Llemit and threw the ball towards the ring for a successful field goal. With 0.5 seconds still remaining, UST drew up a play with Llemmit inbounding to Acido. The third-year wing launched a triple but was blocked by the Bulldogs' Mo Diassana as the buzzer sounded. The Tigers suffered their second straight defeat and have fallen to a 2–3 record and a seventh place in the standings.

Jumawan led the Tigers with 22 points on a +16 player impact rating, while the duo of Llemit and Acido scored 21 and 20 points, respectively, on top of nine rebounds each and a combined 11 assists between the two. Akowe, though limited to only six shot attempts by the opponent's defense still finished with 11 points and eight rebounds, on top of two steals.

	1	2	3	4	Total
FEU	20	21	9	19	69
UST	12	16	29	24	81

FEU Tamaraws

The Growling Tigers defeated the league-leading FEU Tamaraws, 81–69 to arrest their two-game skid and regain relevance with a .500 record of 3–3. They were also able to put an end to FEU's four-game winning streak. UST was again trailing early and embarked on another third-quarter comeback but ended up successful this time as they finally came away with the win.

"It was Hell Week for us with those two losses, but we tried our best. You all know what we went through in the NU game, (it was a) heartbreaker. But tonight, the good thing is that these guys were not affected so much. We just did what we had to do in the second half. There's a disparity between the first and second halves, so the coaches were scolding the players. We all chimed in during the huddle and they responded well. The coaches can only do so much so it's up to those on the floor, and these guys (Llemit, Akowe, and Chio) did the work in the second half. And now, I'm asking them to watch the film of the third quarter, because we were playing beautifully, (we were) passing the ball, making plays for one another, getting those extra rebounds, diving for the (loose) ball, and I think that's how it should be in every game. That's what we need to do to be competitive."

— Peter Martin, UST assistant coach

The game started with both teams missing, as Llemit's back-to-back jump shot and Akowe's layup attempts failed to go in. Danting next missed a three-point attempt until the first basket was scored via free throws when Akowe made two-for-two from a foul by FEU's Mo Konateh. The Tamaraws' Jedrick Daa made the first field goal of the game with a triple to put FEU in the lead, at 3–2. Cañete answered with a three of his own, followed by misses and bad passes by both teams for the next two-and-a-half minutes. The stalemate was broken by a jumper by the Tamaraws' Janrey Pasaol for a 5–all tally. It was the start of a 17–4 run by FEU that saw four different players scoring for them. Rookie Andrew Chio came off the bench to replace Cañete with ball-handling duties and scored the Tigers' two baskets during the Tamaraws' rally, as the first quarter ended with UST trailing by eight, at 12–20. In the second quarter, FEU scored 13 unanswered points with back-to-back triples from Jorick Bautista and Luke Felipe for a 32–19 lead. Llemit and the Tamaraws' Kirby Mongcopoa traded baskets, as the Tigers drew closer within seven at 26–39. Similar to their previous game against NU, the Tigers struggled to find their offensive rhythm in the first half as they could only put up 28 points against the Tamaraws' 41.

UST caught fire at the start of the second half with their defense against FEU also clicking. The Tigers were able to wrest the lead at 56–46, before Bautista and Konateh made baskets at the end of the period for a 57–50 UST lead. The Tigers' offensive surge resulted to a 29-point third-quarter output, while their defense limited their opponents to only nine points.

The final period began with Bautista, Konateh, and Felipe scoring ten straight points to send the Tamaraws back at the lead, at 60–59. Llemit scored on a three-point play to put the Tigers back ahead, at 62–60, but Pasaol quickly made a layup to tie the game again. The two teams traded field goals in the next three minutes for a 69–all count after Konateh surprised his defender with a three-pointer at the 2:36 mark. FEU soon after lost their firepower and it was all UST from that point on as they racked up jumpers and layups against the Tamaraws' tired defense. A bad pass by Pasaol was intercepted by Akowe, who was fouled by Mongcopa to stop a fast break. The 6-10 center made both penalty shots as the Tigers' lead reached ten points, at 79–69. With 22 seconds left, Bautista and Mongcopa fired and missed all three of their three-point attempts. Akowe rebounded the ball with 11 seconds remaining and hesitantly dribbled to their front court for a dunk before the game ended.

Llemit led the team with a double-double of 18 points and 11 rebounds, on top of six assists and a +22 player impact rating. Akowe, who struggled offensively in the first half as he missed his first five attempts also finished with another double-double of 14 points and a game-high of 19 rebounds. Rookie Andrew Chio came off the bench to also score 14 points. Acido also chipped in 12 points to help his team notch the win. Earlier, head coach Pido Jarencio hurriedly left to catch his Terrafirma Dyip team's PBA game at the Ninoy Aquino Stadium.

	1	2	3	4	Total
Ateneo	19	13	10	26	68
UST	18	16	29	17	80

Ateneo Blue Eagles

UST had another third-quarter offensive blitz for the third straight game, this time going against the Ateneo Blue Eagles for an 80–68 win. The game began with the Tigers trailing at 4–8, after Ateneo's Drew Bongo and Kieffer Alas scored four points each, but Akowe and Buenaflor scored back-to-back baskets to pull the team to within two at 9–11. As the two bigs drew the defense, Cañete took advantage and went straight to the rim to tie the score at 11–all. It was a seesaw affair from the third minute on, as Llemit and Akowe's attacks gave them the lead temporarily at 15–13, but turnovers on their part allowed the Eagles to mount a 6–3 run as they once again trailed at 15–19. Llemit's triple at the end of the first quarter sent UST to within one, at 18–19.

The second period continued the trend of swapping of lead changes between the two teams, as the Eagles' Travis Roberts opened with a jumper for a 21–18 count. Llemit and Cañete each made their field goals to send the Tigers ahead at 22–21. Ateneo's Michael Asoro fired a three to break a 26–all deadlock for a 29–26 Eagles lead and soon after, the game turned into a free throw shooting contest with both teams getting into penalty. The Tigers closed out the half with a two-point, 34–32 lead.

UST came out firing at the start of the second half as they greeted their opponents with a 15–0 run to increase their lead to 17, at 49–32. The rally featured a Tracy McGrady-like backboard alley-oop basket by Llemit and was capped by a triple by Acido. Alas was able to sink two free throws before Jumawan and Esteban knocked down a pair of threes for six unanswered points, as the score went up at 55–36. A shot block by Akowe on a floater by Ateneo's Ian Espinosa was ruled a goaltending and pulled the Eagles to 40–55, but the Tigers were not yet done with their scoring barrage as they again scored eight unanswered points. Bongo shot two free throws towards the end of the period to shave off UST's lead at 63–42.

Bongo, Roberts, and Shawn Tuano teamed up for a 7–2 Ateneo run at the start of the final quarter, and jumpers by Alas and Jared Bahay triggered another 7–4 rally by the Eagles for a 56–69 count. The Tigers ended up getting outscored, 17–26, but it was enough to keep the Eagles at bay, with Akowe and Llemit answering every basket that their opponents made until the buzzer sounded.

Akowe led the Tigers with 18 points and 15 rebounds. Acido and Llemit added 15 points each with Buenaflor also finishing in double figures with 11 points. UST wrapped up the first round of eliminations with back-to-back wins and a winning record of 4–3.

=== Second round ===
UP Fighting Maroons

	1	2	3	4	OT	2OT	Total
UST	24	25	23	14	10	5	101
UP	26	21	18	21	10	7	103

"I'm just thankful because my shots were going in, but it's regretful that we lost the game. We just need to make up for it in our next game. We still have a few games to play so we're going to regroup and bounce back."

— Mark Llemit

Mark Llemit's career-high of 33 points was spoiled by the Tigers' 101–103 double-overtime loss against the UP Fighting Maroons in their second-round meeting. It was a battle of momentum shifts between the two teams for the entire game, including the two extra periods. UST appeared to pull away in the third quarter when they went for a 16–6 run in the opening four minutes of the period behind a barrage of three-pointers from Cañete, Acido, Jumawan, and Llemit that resulted to an 11-point, 65–53 cushion, but UP was able to hold a 12–3 counter-rally to narrow the gap to three, at 68–65. Llemit and Cañete gave the Tigers a four-point swing to end the quarter with a 72–65 lead. The fourth period began with both teams missing their shots until the Maroons' Yniguez and Remogat made baskets to tie the score at 72–all. A series of turnovers by the Tigers, including a shot clock violation helped UP to gain advantage at 84–76 with two minutes remaining, but they were able to catch up with clutch free throws from Llemit and Cañete. UST's team captain was fouled on a transition fast break and made both charities. UP's Jacob Bayla caught an assist from Remogat and hopped to the post for a quick layup for an 86–78 count Cañete next shot 3-of-3 from the stripe after he was fouled by the Maroons' Dikachi Ududo while attempting a three to come within two at 84–86 with 28 seconds remaining. UP called a timeout and decided to make the inbound from UST's backcourt to milk the clock, but Llemit caught up with Remogat and fouled him. They had not reached penalty yet but they were able to force a traveling call on Pre at the 16.6-second mark. Akowe went for a power move at the post and scored the equalizer with 8.2 seconds remaining. Remogat's three-point attempt rimmed out at the buzzer, sending the two teams to overtime.

The Tigers made another run at the free throw line to break away from an 87–all deadlock. Consecutive foul shots by Llemit and Cañete sent them to a 96–89 lead with 1:32 remaining in overtime, but basket conversions by UP's Pre and Bayla, coupled with misses from the arc by Jumawan and Acido helped the Maroons to recover. Jumawan fouled Yniguez on the rebound, sending the UP guard to the line. Yniguez made both penalty shots to tie the game at 96–all. The Maroons had two potential game-winning attempts in the last four seconds, but Bayla and Pre both missed their three-point shots to send the match to another extension.

The second overtime saw Veejay Pre taking on the whole UST squad as he ended up scoring all of UP's points. The sophomore forward used different offensive moves, from a Euro step, to a face-up jumper, to an open layup to give his team a four-point, 102–98 lead over the Tigers in the last 1:32 minutes. A split at the line by Cañete pulled UST to within three, and after a couple of misses by Pre and the Tigers' Charles Esteban, Llemit was able to score on a drive to the basket to trim down the deficit to one, at 101–102, 42 seconds remaining. UST's defense forced Remogat to miss two jump shot attempts and went on a four-on-one transition fast break after Akowe collared the rebound with 11 seconds running on the clock. Cañete, dribbling down drove hard against Remogat but was met with a block that went to UP's Payosing. Pre was fouled by Llemit and made 1-of-2 free throws for a 103–101 advantage. With two seconds left, the Maroons forced Acido to make a bad pass which was intercepted by Payosing as time ran out. With the loss, the Tigers have fallen at 4–4 for a tie at fifth place in the standings with the De La Salle Green Archers.

Llemit's high score was backed by a 10-of-19 shooting clip. Akowe finished with another double-double of 23 points and 18 rebounds, while Cañete contributed 16 points, five assists, and four rebounds. Opposite Llemit was UP's Pre who scored 30 points. They are the first opposing players to score at least 30 points in a game since the Archers' Ben Mbala scored 39 and the UE Red Warriors' Alvin Pasaol topscored for 49 on October 4, 2017.

	1	2	3	4	Total
La Salle	25	22	20	25	92
UST	19	25	27	9	80

De La Salle Green Archers

Despite a record number of three-point shots made, the Growling Tigers lost, 80–92 against the De La Salle Green Archers. The Tigers knocked down 17 triples, the second-most made by a team since record-keeping became official in 2003. They also surpassed their previous high of 16 threes which they made twice in 2010.

Even without the injured Jacob Cortez, the Archers were able to race to a strong start to lead at 24–13, from a 17–7 run. Jumawan scored the game's first basket with a jumper from beyond the arc, but La Salle capitalized on turnovers and misses by the Tigers to gain the upperhand as they scored seven straight points. Danting drained two triples to pull UST to within six, at 19–25 at the end of the first quarter.

The Tigers mounted their own 17–9 rally in the second period behind a trio of three-pointers from Jumawan and a twinner by Llemit to seize the lead at 36–34, but Abadam countered with a three to reclaim the lead for the Archers. Danting and Abadam exchanged triples as both teams kept the game close with under two minutes left in the half. A three-point swing gave La Salle a four-point, 45–41 advantage before Llemit's three and two free throws by the Archers' Vhoris Marasigan ended the period with La Salle in the lead, at 47–44.

The second half saw the opposing teams trade three-point baskets, with Jumawan's trey putting UST to within two, at 47–49 and then an exchange between La Salle's Dungo and Llemit had the Archers slightly ahead at 55–54. Macalalag's triple at the 6:22 mark widened La Salle's advantage by four, at 58–54, but two consecutive jumpers from the rainbow arc by Acido's pushed the Tigers ahead with a two-point, 62–60 cushion. Not to be outdone, Abadam and Llemit traded more threes, followed by Jumawan and Macalalag for a 68–66 UST lead with two and-a-half minutes left in the third period. A long stretch of scoring drought by both teams followed until Akowe converted on a layup from a dish by Acido to give the Tigers a four-point, 70–66 separation from La Salle. The quarter ended with free throws by Danting and the Archers' Joaquin Tovera, as the Tigers held on to their four-point gap at 71–67.

"We're not giving up by going on an early exit this season. The eagerness to win games is still there, but the losses are hard to accept and it's been keeping us down. Getting back up is always easier said than done. We need to let this experience sink in, because I believe that it's the only way for us to get back up and start winning again. Mistakes do happen in basketball. Nothing is perfect, so it's a matter of how you can motivate and guide the team, to get them to go on and keep fighting until the last game."

— Amiel Acido

La Salle fired five triples in the final period to regain control over UST, with four coming from Dungo, but it was Macalalag who sparked a 14–3 run by the Archers at the first three minutes of the quarter to overturn the Tigers' 73–71 lead. Acido fired another three, followed by a layup by Llemit as UST got to within six, at 79–85 but a barrage of baskets by Macalalag and Tovera kept them at bay. Their only point production that followed came by way of a split free throw by Akowe to put the team to within eight, at 80–88. They ended up scoring only nine points against the Archers' 25 in the quarter as they shot 3-for-14 in the field, and only 1-of-18 from beyond the arc.

The Tigers remained winless in the second round following their second straight loss and have fallen to a 4–5 record. Acido led the team with 20 points on a 6-of-16 clip, five of which were threes. Jumawan finished with 18 points, all scored on triples. Llemit added 15 points with three three-pointers made, while Akowe ended up with yet another double-double of 11 points and 14 rebounds with a 7-of-8 free throw shooting.

	1	2	3	4	Total
UST	18	21	18	14	71
NU	24	16	17	18	75

NU Bulldogs

UST suffered their third straight setback after losing against the NU Bulldogs, 71–75. They have yet to win a game in the second round and have fallen to a 4–6 record. The Tigers' comeback attempt fell short again as they failed to haul down a crucial rebound needed to gain ball possession during the dying seconds of the game. Down by two, at 71–73 with seven seconds remaining, they fouled NU's Palacielo twice in succession to stop the clock. The senior forward from the opposing team missed his second penalty shot but he was able to grab the offensive board. Andrew Chio fouled him with three seconds left on the clock to send him back to the line and made one-of-two for a two-possession lead and effectively put the game out of the Tigers' reach.

Buenaflor and Donovan Sevilla, playing in only his fourth game after recovering from an injury started the game scoring with three-point baskets. Akowe followed with a perfect 2-for-2 free throw shooting to give UST a four-point, 8–4 lead. The two teams traded field goals before Acido made his own three off an assist by Mur Alao for a five-point, 16–11 advantage. A 12–0 run by NU which began from Mo Diassana's layup and a crucial turnover by Alao yielded the lead to the Bulldogs, at 16–23. NU's Chad Cartel capped the rally with a triple with 44 seconds left in the period. Akowe broke UST's scoring spell after another perfect shooting at the line in the last 27 seconds of the quarter. The Tigers' five-point lead at 11–6 was their biggest in the entire game where they mostly played catch-up to the Bulldogs.

Both teams started slowly in the next frame as the first points were scored via free throws from Jumawan and NU's Jumamoy at the 8:43 mark. The Tigers' first field goal was made at the 5:22 mark when Kristian Porter hit a three-pointer to cut UST's deficit from twelve to nine, at 23–32. Llemit followed with a three of his own as they outscored the Bulldogs, 13–8 in the last four minutes to close out the half trailing by just one point, at 39–40.

The Tigers were finally able to seize the lead at 42–40 after another Llemit triple, but the Bulldogs next went on an 11–0 run to retake the lead at 55–44. Chio broke UST's silence with a jump shot to come within nine. After a thunderous slam by NU's Diassana, Chio and Acido scored five straight points to trim down the deficit to one, at 54–55. A three-pointer by Acido in the 33-second mark of the quarter tied the count at 57–all. Chio's triple and a layup by Porter at the start of the final period put the team ahead before the Bulldogs scored ten straight points for a 67–62 advantage. Akowe momentarily stopped NU's run after making both charity shots, but Jumamoy and Palacielo resumed their rally for a 71–64 lead with 2:41 remaining. Diassana was able to execute a second slam in the last 42 seconds for 73–66 score. A short undergoal stab by Akowe sparked a 7–2 late-game rally by the Tigers, as Jumawan's three-pointer and Acido's two-for-two free throws breathed hope to the Tigers' chance of winning the game. They had cut down the deficit by two, at 71–73 with seven seconds left in the game.

When the Bulldogs tightened their defense in the fourth quarter, UST had a hard time getting their shots to fall. They went through a seven-minute scoring drought, missing nine straight field goal attempts, six from forced three-pointers. They ended up making only 13 out of 40 three-point attempts.

Rebounding was also a key absence from UST's arsenal, which hindered their comeback completion. They were heavily outrebounded, 29–59, with the bulk of NU's boards coming from offensive rebounds. They were dominated in the paint, 16–46, and as a result of the opponent's offensive rebounding, they also got outscored in second-chance points, 14–25. The Bulldogs' bigs were too much for Akowe to handle as he failed to contain them, with Diassana, Palacielo, and Padrones scoring 16, 14, and 13, respectively. The Tigers' center was only able to collar five rebounds and had a -15 player impact rating.

Acido and Llemit ended the game in double-digit scoring with 13 and 12 points, respectively, with Akowe and Chio adding 11 markers apiece.

	1	2	3	4	Total
FEU	24	21	18	22	85
UST	19	24	26	17	86

FEU Tamaraws

The Growling Tigers went unscathed from the FEU Tamaraws' multitude of three-point attempts at endgame for an 86–85 victory as they notched their first win in the second round while also arresting their three-game losing skid.

Similar to their first-round meeting, UST was trailing again in the first half, but slowly made their way back to outscore the Tamaraws, 26–18 in the third quarter. Acido found his shooting touch and fired three of his four three-pointers in the crucial stages of the final period.

"We've been struggling these past games, but it's in how we rally back, we worked on ways to get back up even if the task seemed daunting."

— Amiel Acido

FEU rookie Cabs Cabonilas broke a three and-a-half-minute scoring drought by both teams when he made a layup with under two minutes left in the game to bring the Tamaraws to within a single point, at 79–80. The Tigers called a timeout and designed a play that had Acido firing a triple successfully from an assist by Chio to give the team enough breathing room with an 83–79 separation. Cabonilas was not done yet, as he answered with a triple of his own to pull the Tamaraws back closer at 82–83. A near-turnover was preempted by Jumawan near the sideline who quickly passed the ball to Acido for an open three, giving UST back a two-possession lead with a minute-and-twelve remaining. FEU soon went trigger-happy with their three-pointers, as Bautista and Pasaol fired and missed in succession with 48 seconds left on the clock. Ball possession went to UST after Akowe's rebound, and as the ball went to Llemit's hands, Mo Konateh fouled him to stop the clock. FEU has not reached penalty yet, so they kept fouling UST players at the inbound play. They were able to force a turnover on their third try as the Tigers' shot clock expired with 27 seconds remaining. The Tamaraws kept missing their desperation threes as attempts by Bautista and Cabonilas both bounced out, with the rebound going into Akowe's hands again. He was fouled by Cabonilas and was promptly sent to the line. The sophomore big man, shooting his charities for the first time in the game missed both and Konateh was there to grab the board with nine seconds running on the clock. Bautista finally nailed a triple as the buzzer ended, enabling UST to escape with a one-point win.

Acido had a game-high of 23 points, with a 4-of-7 three-point field goal. Jumawan added 18 points, 12 coming by way of three-point baskets, while Llemit finished with 16 points and seven rebounds.

	1	2	3	4	Total
UE	19	22	15	14	70
UST	35	23	24	15	97

UE Red Warriors

Just days after the UE Red Warriors ended their 30-game losing streak, the Growling Tigers sent them back to the losing column with a 27-point, 97–70 drubbing in their second-round meeting. The win boosted UST's hopes of reaching the Final Four as they regained a .500 record of 6–6 in the standings.

Peter Osang made an impressive debut with a double-double performance of 19 points and 10 rebounds, on top of a team-high of five shot blocks. The 6-foot-7 Nigerian big man played in his first official UAAP game since joining the Tigers' camp in 2023. The backup foreign student-athlete suited up in place of the sophomore Collins Akowe.

"The first time we played them (UE), they were using their speed to break our defense so we needed someone who can match their energy. Peter (Osang) has always been a part of our team. We're happy with the way he performed today and (in choosing which FSA to play) it's going to give us problems in the future."

— Peter Martin

After trading baskets with the Warriors and gaining a slight lead of 12–9, UST blasted their way to a 16-point separation as they took advantage of their opponent's weak perimeter defense for a 35–19 cushion at the end of the opening period. Osang scored nine of his total output, while Jumawan and Buenaflor added eight and six points in the ten-minute frame.

UE tried to match the Tigers' offense in the second quarter but fell short in surpassing them as the half ended with UST enjoying a 17-point advantage at 58–41. The Tigers mounted their biggest lead of 31 pooints in the final period after seldom-used Jiro Sevilla drained a three-pointer for a 95–64 advantage.

Backing Osang was Acido who topscored with 22 points, six rebounds, five assists, and three steals. Jumawan added 16 points, while Llemit and Buenaflor had 11 and 10, respectively while combining for 15 rebounds, as the team outhustled the Warriors at the board, 52–35.

== Awards ==
Name	Tournament	Award	Date	Ref.
Team	NSAC Campus Tour	Champions	31 May 2026	
Team	PinoyLiga The Big Dance	Champions	3 Sep 2026	
Team	PinoyLiga Global Invitationals	Runners-up	22 Feb 2026	
Team	Asiabasket World Invitational	Runners-up	16 Aug 2026	
Collins Akowe	Asiabasket World Invitational	MVP, Mythical team	16 Aug 2026	
Collins Akowe	PinoyLiga The Big Dance	MVP, Mythical team	3 Sep 2026	
Mark Llemit	PinoyLiga The Big Dance	Mythical team	3 Sep 2026	
Mark Llemit	UAAP Men's basketball	Player of the Week	14–18 Oct 2026	
Mark Llemit	NSAC Campus Tour	Finals MVP	31 May 2026	
Gelo Crisostomo	NSAC Campus Tour	Mythical team	31 May 2026	
Landyn Jumawan	PinoyLiga The Big Dance	Mythical team	3 Sep 2026	
Amiel Acido	Filoil Preseason Cup	3-point Shootout champion	21 Jul 2026	
