= 2022 FIBA U18 Asian Championship =

26th FIBA Under-18 Asian Basketball Championship

Tournament details
- Host country: Iran
- City: Tehran
- Dates: 21−28 August
- Teams: 10 (from 1 confederation)
- Venue(s): 1 (in 1 host city)

Final positions
- Champions: South Korea (4th title)
- Runners-up: Japan
- Third place: China

Tournament statistics
- MVP: (South Korea) Lee Ju-yeong
- Top scorer: (South Korea) Lee J. (23.2)
- Top rebounds: (Japan) Kawashima (10.6)
- Top assists: (South Korea) Lee C. (5.8)
- PPG (Team): China (90.4)
- RPG (Team): Philippines (50.2)
- APG (Team): China (22.8)

Official website
- www.fiba.basketball/history

The 2022 FIBA U18 Asian Championship was an international under-18 men's basketball competition that was held in Tehran, Iran, from 21 to 28 August 2022.

The tournament, which is also the 26th edition of the biennial competition, will qualify the top four teams to represent FIBA Asia in the 2023 FIBA Under-19 Basketball World Cup in Hungary. This is the third time that Iran has hosted the tournament after hosting the 2008 and 2016 editions.

South Korea edged Japan in the Final, 77–73 to claim the championship and their fourth title overall, the first since 2000. Meanwhile, China defended their Bronze Medal finish they got four years ago by defeating Lebanon in the Third Place Game, 85–68. All these teams have already secured qualifications for FIBA Asia and will compete to the 2023 FIBA U19 Basketball World Cup.

== Qualification ==
=== Allocation of berths ===
According to FIBA Asia rules, the number of participating teams in the FIBA U18 Asian Championship was set at 16. The hosts and the defending champions qualified automatically. All FIBA Asia subzones got two berths each, except for the Central and South Asian subzones, which got one berth each. FIBA Oceania also got one berth. The last three berths were allocated to Asian subzones based on their teams' results in the 2018 FIBA U18 Asian Championship.

Allocation of berths
Subzone	Automatic qualifiers		Default berths	Additional berths as top 3 Asian teams from last championship	Total
Subzone	Hosts	Defending champions	Default berths	Additional berths as top 3 Asian teams from last championship	Total
Central Asia	0	0	1	0	1
East Asia	0	0	2	2	4
Gulf	0	0	2	0	2
South Asia	0	0	1	0	1
Southeast Asia	0	0	2	1	3
West Asia	1	0	2	0	3
FIBA Oceania	0	1	1	—	2
Total	1	1	11	3	16

Many teams withdrew from this tournament due to the COVID-19 pandemic, so the allocation did not match the involved teams.

=== Qualified teams ===
Eventually, only ten teams participated in this tournament. The FIBA Boys' World Rankings as of 1 January 2022 are shown in parentheses.

Means of qualification	Date	Venue	Berths	Qualifiers
Host nation			1	Iran (17)
2018 FIBA U18 Asian Championship champions	5–11 August 2018	(Thailand) Nonthaburi	1	~~Australia~~
2022 U18 CABA Qualifier	N/A	N/A	1	~~TBD~~
2022 U18 EABA Qualifier	N/A	N/A	4	China (21); Chinese Taipei (22); South Korea (27); Japan (32)
2022 U18 GBA Qualifier	29 July–6 August 2022	(United Arab Emirates) Dubai	2	Qatar (NR); ~~TBD~~
2022 U18 SABA Qualifier	2–4 June 2022	(India) Cuttack	1	India (50)
2022 U18 SEABA Qualifier	N/A	N/A	3	Philippines (24); ~~TBD~~; ~~TBD~~
2022 U18 WABA Qualifier	25–30 July 2022	(Syria) Damascus	2	Lebanon (35); Syria (90)
FIBA Oceania	N/A	N/A	1	~~TBD~~
Total			16	

== Format ==
This edition of the tournament will be using a different format as compared to what was used since 2018. Since there are only ten teams participating, a draw to determine the quarterfinal pairings will be held after all Preliminary games has finished.

The qualified teams shall be divided into four (4) pots. The cumulative ranking between the three (3) groups, established according to the FIBA Official Basketball Rules, Chapter D – Classification of Teams, shall be used to determine the teams in different pots as follows:

- Pot D shall consist of two (2) best ranked teams in the cumulative ranking;
- Pot E shall consist of 3rd and 4th ranked teams in the cumulative ranking;
- Pot F shall consist of 5th and 6th ranked teams in the cumulative ranking; and
- Pot G shall consist of the 7th and 8th ranked teams in the cumulative ranking.

The teams from Pot D will be drawn against the teams from Pot G and the teams from Pot E will be drawn against the teams from Pot F; Teams from the same group in the Group Phase cannot be drawn against each other in the Quarter-Finals.

== Venue ==
The Azadi Basketball Hall in Tehran will host all the games of the competition.

== Preliminary round ==
All times are local (UTC+4:30).

=== Group A ===
Pos	Team	Pld	W	L	PF	PA	PD	Pts	Qualification
1	Japan	2	1	1	150	131	+19	3 (Note: 1−1, 1.145 (beaten Lebanon, lost to Iran))	Quarterfinals
2	Iran (H)	2	1	1	131	131	0	3 (Note: 1−1, 1.000 (beaten Japan, lost to Lebanon))	Quarterfinals
3	Lebanon	2	1	1	128	147	−19	3 (Note: 1−1, 0.871 (beaten Iran, lost to Japan))	Quarterfinals

Source: FIBA
Rules for classification: 1) Points; 2) Head-to-head results; 3) Points difference; 4) Points scored.
(H) Hosts
Notes:

21 August 2022
18:00

Boxscore

Iran	63–65	Lebanon
Scoring by quarter: 18–16, 21–14, 6–12, 18–23
Pts: Amini 24; Rebs: Amini 9 Asts: Ahmadpour 4		Pts: Rtail 17; Rebs: Assaf 11; Asts: Rtail, Abou Sleiman 3

Azadi Basketball Hall, Tehran
Referees: Issam Nasser Al Siyabi (OMA), Nattapong Jontapa (THA), Yu Fu-Jung (TPE)

22 August 2022
18:00

Boxscore

Lebanon	63–84	Japan
Scoring by quarter: 12–17, 9–25, 23–19, 19–23
Pts: Rtail 18; Rebs: Assaf, Rtail 10; Asts: Abou Sleiman, Kozah 3		Pts: Kawashima 22; Rebs: Kawashima 14; Asts: Todoroki 7

Azadi Basketball Hall, Tehran
Referees: Nattapong Jontapa (THA), Sun Jian (CHN), Kamjae Cheon (KOR)

23 August 2022
18:00

Boxscore

Japan	66–68	Iran
Scoring by quarter: 24–14, 25–13, 10–23, 7–18
Pts: three players 13; Rebs: Kawashima 8 Asts: Yamada 8		Pts: Amini 23; Rebs: Asgari Nia 12; Asts: Ahmadpour 3

Azadi Basketball Hall, Tehran
Referees: Sun Jian (CHN), Bandar Jassim M J Al Suwaidi (QAT), Yu Fu-Jung (TPE)

=== Group B ===
Pos	Team	Pld	W	L	PF	PA	PD	Pts	Qualification
1	China	2	2	0	194	139	+55	4	Quarterfinals
2	South Korea	2	1	1	174	152	+22	3	Quarterfinals
3	India	2	0	2	128	205	−77	2	

Source: FIBA
Rules for classification: 1) Points; 2) Head-to-head results; 3) Points difference; 4) Points scored.

21 August 2022
13:30

Report

China	105–65	India
Scoring by quarter: 30–14, 24–14, 26–20, 25–17
Pts: Liu J. 28; Rebs: Weng, Yang 11; Asts: Zhang 6		Pts: Dagar 19; Rebs: L. Singh 8 Asts: Dagar 5

Azadi Basketball Hall, Tehran
Referees: Sadegh Ghanbari Damanab (IRI), Ahmad Suleiman Alyousef (JOR), John Lester Celeste (PHI)

22 August 2022
11:15

Boxscore

India	63–100	South Korea
Scoring by quarter: 13–28, 13–22, 20–25, 17–25
Pts: Ravish 18; Rebs: Dagar 6 Asts: Dagar 6		Pts: Lee J. 21; Rebs: Yoo 7 Asts: Lee C. 10

Azadi Basketball Hall, Tehran
Referees: Issam Nasser Al Siyabi (OMA), Claude Abi Gebrael (LBN), Bandar Jassim M J Al Suwaidi (QAT)

23 August 2022
15:45

Boxscore

South Korea	74–89	China
Scoring by quarter: 17–28, 19–23, 16–15, 22–23
Pts: Lee J. 24; Rebs: Yoo 9 Asts: Lee C. 7		Pts: three players 18; Rebs: Liu J., Wang 9 Asts: Yang 7

Azadi Basketball Hall, Tehran
Referees: Ahmad Suleiman Alyousef (JOR), Claude Abi Gebrael (LBN), Mohammad Rajabiozoodi (IRN)

=== Group C ===
Pos	Team	Pld	W	L	PF	PA	PD	Pts	Qualification
1	Philippines	3	3	0	273	182	+91	6	Quarterfinals
2	Chinese Taipei	3	2	1	250	206	+44	5	Quarterfinals
3	Qatar	3	1	2	206	239	−33	4	Quarterfinals
4	Syria	3	0	3	174	276	−102	3	

Source: FIBA
Rules for classification: 1) Points; 2) Head-to-head results; 3) Points difference; 4) Points scored.

21 August 2022
11:15

Report

Chinese Taipei	96–62	Qatar
Scoring by quarter: 20–16, 32–12, 19–19, 25–15
Pts: Yeh 21; Rebs: Cheng 9 Asts: Chen 6		Pts: Abbasher 19; Rebs: Ndao 11; Asts: Abuissa 6

Azadi Basketball Hall, Tehran
Referees: Rabah Noujaim (LBN), Mohammad Rajabiozoodi (IRN), Cheon Kamjae (KOR)

21 August 2022
15:45

Report

Philippines	112–48	Syria
Scoring by quarter: 35–7, 18–9, 34–8, 25–24
Pts: Amos 26; Rebs: Porter 13; Asts: Alao 8		Pts: Kastntin 12; Rebs: Dabdoob, Makanas 9 Asts: five players 2

Azadi Basketball Hall, Tehran
Referees: Rakesh Ramalingaiah (IND), Ramin Fathi (IRN), Sun Jian (CHN)

22 August 2022
13:30

Boxscore

Syria	60–81	Chinese Taipei
Scoring by quarter: 12–17, 16–15, 15–19, 17–30
Pts: Kastntin 18; Rebs: Makanas 12; Asts: Eid 3		Pts: Chang 21; Rebs: Cheng 9 Asts: Chang 6

Azadi Basketball Hall, Tehran
Referees: Rakesh Ramalingaiah (IND), Mohammad Rajabiozoodi (IRN), Ramin Fathi (IRN)

22 August 2022
15:45

Boxscore

Qatar	61–77	Philippines
Scoring by quarter: 18–24, 17–10, 13–20, 13–23
Pts: Abbasher, Ndao 14; Rebs: H. Mousa 11; Asts: Abbasher 4		Pts: Amos 21; Rebs: Amos 7 Asts: Alao 7

Azadi Basketball Hall, Tehran
Referees: Rabah Noujaim (LBN), Sadegh Ghanbari Damanab (IRI), Ahmad Suleiman Alyousef (JOR)

23 August 2022
11:15

Boxscore

Syria	66–83	Qatar
Scoring by quarter: 19–21, 15–31, 12–16, 20–15
Pts: Makanas 20; Rebs: Eid 11; Asts: Ibrahim 4		Pts: Ndao 20; Rebs: Hajar 11; Asts: Abuissa 6

Azadi Basketball Hall, Tehran
Referees: Sadegh Ghanbari Damanab (IRI), Rakesh Ramalingaiah (IND), Cheon Kamjae (KOR)

23 August 2022
13:30

Boxscore

Chinese Taipei	73–84	Philippines
Scoring by quarter: 18–28, 21–14, 24–18, 10–24
Pts: Chang 24; Rebs: Shih 7 Asts: Chiu 4		Pts: Amos 28; Rebs: Pablo 9 Asts: Bahay 10

Azadi Basketball Hall, Tehran
Referees: Rabah Noujaim (LBN), Nattapong Jontapa (THA), Issam Nasser Al Siyabi (OMA)

== Knockout stage ==
=== Quarterfinal draw ===
Pot Position	Team	Record
D1	Philippines	3–0
D2	China	2–0
E1	Chinese Taipei	2–1
E2	South Korea	1–1
F1	Japan	1–1
F2	Iran	1–1
G1	Lebanon	1–1
G2	Qatar	1–2

=== Bracket ===
Fifth place game
D1	Philippines	72
F2	Iran	89
Seventh place game
E1	Chinese Taipei	93
G2	Qatar	71

5th–8th place semifinals
E1	Chinese Taipei	67
D1	Philippines	72
G2	Qatar	45
F2	Iran	82

Quarterfinals
F1	Japan	76
E1	Chinese Taipei	60
G1	Lebanon	99
D1	Philippines	83
G2	Qatar	44
D2	China	88
F2	Iran	65
E2	South Korea	66

Semifinals
F1	Japan	80
G1	Lebanon	67
D2	China	85
E2	South Korea	89

Final
Japan	73
South Korea	77
Third place game
Lebanon	68
China	85

=== Quarterfinals ===
24 August 2022
09:00

Boxscore

China	88–44	Qatar
Scoring by quarter: 25–10, 19–12, 21–14, 23–8
Pts: Lyu, Ma 12; Rebs: Ma, Liu L. 6 Asts: Ma 7		Pts: Al-Abdulla, H. Mousa 9 Rebs: Abbasher, Hajar 5 Asts: Mou. Ndao 7

Azadi Basketball Hall, Tehran
Referees: Nattapong Jontapa (THA), Claude Abi Gebrael (LBN), John Lester Celeste (PHI)

24 August 2022
11:15

Boxscore

Lebanon	99–83	Philippines
Scoring by quarter: 27–11, 26–24, 27–18, 19–30
Pts: Mansour 28; Rebs: Zamatta 17; Asts: Abou Sleiman 8		Pts: Amos 11; Rebs: Amos 7 Asts: Gamber 4

Azadi Basketball Hall, Tehran
Referees: Sadegh Ghanbari Damanab (IRN), Bandar Jassim M J Al Suwaidi (QAT), Mohammad Rajabiozoodi (IRN)

24 August 2022
13:30

Boxscore

Chinese Taipei	60–76	Japan
Scoring by quarter: 12–17, 17–25, 15–21, 16–13
Pts: Kuo 17; Rebs: Hsu, Shih 8 Asts: Hsu 8		Pts: Yaegashi 19; Rebs: Wakugawa 11; Asts: Todoroki 7

Azadi Basketball Hall, Tehran
Referees: Rakesh Ramalingaiah (IND), Cheon Kamjae (KOR), Ramin Fathi (IRN)

24 August 2022
18:00

Boxscore

Iran	65–66	South Korea
Scoring by quarter: 18–22, 8–22, 20–8, 19–14
Pts: Amini 20; Rebs: Amini, Asgari Nia 13; Asts: Ahmadpour 6		Pts: Lee C. 16; Rebs: Yoo 9 Asts: Kang, Lee J. 5

Azadi Basketball Hall, Tehran
Referees: Rabah Noujaim (LBN), Issam Nasser Al Siyabi (OMA), Ahmad Suleiman Alyousef (JOR)

=== 5th–8th place semifinals ===
26 August 2022
11:15

Boxscore

Philippines	72–67	Chinese Taipei
Scoring by quarter: 12–19, 23–8, 24–16, 13–24
Pts: Amos 21; Rebs: Gagate 14; Asts: Amos, Gamber 3		Pts: Yeh 17; Rebs: Kuo 6 Asts: Hsu 5

Azadi Basketball Hall, Tehran
Referees: Rakesh Ramalingaiah (IND), Ahmad Suleiman Alyousef (JOR), Cheon Kamjae (KOR)

26 August 2022
13:30

Boxscore

Iran	82–45	Qatar
Scoring by quarter: 20–6, 12–7, 22–19, 28–13
Pts: Asgari Nia 18; Rebs: Amini 12; Asts: Jafari 5		Pts: H. Mousa 15; Rebs: Abuissa, Moh. Ndao 5 Asts: Abbasher 5

Azadi Basketball Hall, Tehran
Referees: Nattapong Jontapa (THA), Claude Abi Gebrael (LBN), Sun Jian (CHN)

=== Semifinals ===
26 August 2022
15:45

Boxscore

South Korea	89–85	China
Scoring by quarter: 14–26, 27–19, 21–24, 27–16
Pts: Lee J. 29; Rebs: Lee C., Kang 6 Asts: Kang 7		Pts: Liu L. 19; Rebs: Yang 11; Asts: Ma 7

Azadi Basketball Hall, Tehran
Referees: Issam Nasser Al Siyabi (OMA), John Lester Celeste (PHI), Ramin Fathi (IRN)

26 August 2022
18:00

Boxscore

Lebanon	67–80	Japan
Scoring by quarter: 14–21, 13–16, 23–25, 17–18
Pts: Kozah 17; Rebs: Rtail 7 Asts: Rtail 4		Pts: Ozawa 21; Rebs: Wakugawa 13; Asts: Wakugawa 6

Azadi Basketball Hall, Tehran
Referees: Sadegh Ghanbari Damanab (IRI), Bandar Jassim M J Al Suwaidi (QAT), Mohammad Rajabiozoodi (IRN)

=== Seventh place game ===
28 August 2022
11:15

Boxscore

Qatar	71–93	Chinese Taipei
Scoring by quarter: 17–19, 24–19, 22–27, 8–28
Pts: H. Mousa 24; Rebs: Abbasher 10; Asts: Hajar 6		Pts: Yeh 23; Rebs: three players 4 Asts: Chang 11

Azadi Basketball Hall, Tehran
Referees: Mohammad Rajabiozoodi (IRN), Claude Abi Gebrael (LBN), Ramin Fathi (IRN)

=== Fifth place game ===
28 August 2022
13:30

Boxscore

Iran	89–72	Philippines
Scoring by quarter: 18–17, 25–13, 23–16, 23–26
Pts: Ahmadpour, Amini 19; Rebs: Khosravi 12; Asts: Amini 9		Pts: Amos 22; Rebs: Coronel 6 Asts: Bahay 8

Azadi Basketball Hall, Tehran
Referees: Issam Nasser Al Siyabi (OMA), Sun Jian (CHN), Yu Fu-Jung (TPE)

=== Third place game ===
28 August 2022
15:45

Boxscore

China	85–68	Lebanon
Scoring by quarter: 20–25, 29–9, 17–10, 19–24
Pts: Liu L. 22; Rebs: Yang 13; Asts: Weng 7		Pts: Rtail 21; Rebs: Assaf 8 Asts: Abou Samra 6

Azadi Basketball Hall, Tehran
Referees: Nattapong Jontapa (THA), Rakesh Ramalingaiah (IND), Cheon Kamjae (KOR)

=== Final ===
28 August 2022
18:00

Boxscore

South Korea	77–73	Japan
Scoring by quarter: 19–24, 25–22, 15–18, 18–9
Pts: Lee J. 28; Rebs: three players 5 Asts: Kang 6		Pts: Wakugawa 15; Rebs: Kawashima 13; Asts: Todoroki, Wakugawa 5

Azadi Basketball Hall, Tehran
Referees: Rabah Noujaim (LBN), Sadegh Ghanbari Damanab (IRI), Ahmad Suleiman Alyousef (JOR)

== Final standings ==
Qualified for the 2023 FIBA Under-19 Basketball World Cup

Rank	Team	Record
1st place, gold medalist(s)	South Korea	4–1
2nd place, silver medalist(s)	Japan	3–2
3rd place, bronze medalist(s)	China	4–1
4	Lebanon	2–3
5	Iran	3–2
6	Philippines	4–2
7	Chinese Taipei	3–3
8	Qatar	1–5
9	India	0–2
10	Syria	0–3

== Awards ==
2022 Under-18 Asian champions

South Korea
Fourth title

Most Valuable Player
(South Korea) Lee Ju-yeong

=== All-Tournament Team ===
- C (China) Yang Hansen
- F (Japan) Yuto Kawashima
- F (Iran) Mohammad Amini
- G (South Korea) Lee Ju-yeong (MVP)
- G (South Korea) Lee Chae-hyung
