= 2016 SEABA Under-18 Championship =

2016 SEABA U-18 Championship
10th Southeast Asian Basketball Championship

Tournament details
- Host country: Indonesia
- Dates: 23–28 April
- Teams: 6
- Venue(s): 1 (in 1 host city)

Final positions
- Champions: Philippines (8th title)

Tournament statistics
- Top scorer: (Philippines) Sinclair (16.0)
- Top rebounds: (Philippines) Sinclair (9.6)
- Top assists: (Philippines) Nelle (Philippines) Yu (4.0)
- PPG (Team): Philippines (104.2)
- RPG (Team): Philippines (54.7)
- APG (Team): Philippines (22.2)

The 2016 SEABA Under-18 Championship was the qualifying tournament for Southeast Asia Basketball Association at the 2016 FIBA Asia Under-18 Championship. The tournament was the tenth edition and took place in Medan, Indonesia from 23 April to 28 April 2016. Due to the Philippines' top five finish at the 2014 FIBA Asia Under-18 Championship, the subzone was allotted another spot to be contested, totaling to three spots for SEABA in the Asian tournament.

== Standings ==
Pos	Team	Pld	W	L	PF	PA	PD	Pts	Qualification
1	Philippines	5	5	0	521	290	+231	10	Advance to the finals and to the 2016 FIBA Asia Under-18 Championship
2	Thailand	5	4	1	363	354	+9	9	Advance to the finals and to the 2016 FIBA Asia Under-18 Championship
3	Indonesia	5	3	2	370	362	+8	8	Advance to the third place battle
4	Malaysia	5	2	3	376	370	+6	7	Advance to the third place battle
5	Singapore	5	1	4	361	362	−1	6	Eliminated
6	Laos	5	0	5	296	549	−253	5	Eliminated

Rules for classification: (1) Tournament points, (2) Head-to-head tournament points, (3) Head-to-head goal average, (4) Overall goal average, (5) Drawing of lots

== Round-robin results ==
All times are in Western Indonesian Time (UTC+07:00)

23 April
15:30

Stats

Malaysia	80–75	Singapore
Scoring by quarter: 17–10, 27–20, 15–18, 21–27
Pts: Soong K.A. 16; Rebs: Soong K.A. 12; Asts: Soong K.A. 4		Pts: Yeo 20; Rebs: Rengarajan 13; Asts: Thng Y.A., Tng Z.C. 2

Medan Basketball Court, Medan
Referees: Chuang Chih-Chun (TPE), Samphan Kamphusiriphan (THA), Rendra Lesmana (INA)

23 April
17:30

Stats

Philippines	101–45	Thailand
Scoring by quarter: 22–14, 30–10, 23–7, 26–14
Pts: Mendoza 16; Rebs: Sinclair 11; Asts: Yu 5		Pts: Banchathon 8 Rebs: Limjittakorn, Samakpong 5 Asts: Leelaphipatkul 3

Medan Basketball Court, Medan
Referees: Edmond Ming Tat Ho (HKG), Liu Chee Khun (MAS), Mikeo Thongpathoum (LAO)

23 April
20:00

Stats

Indonesia	83–59	Laos
Scoring by quarter: 24–13, 19–15, 19–19, 21–12
Pts: Saputera 13; Rebs: Nikolas, Titoaji 10; Asts: Noor, Nathan 3		Pts: Thavatsay 22; Rebs: Phenphet 8 Asts: Thavatsay, Phenphet, Joshua 2

Medan Basketball Court, Medan
Referees: Leong Chuen Wing (SIN), Glenn Cornelio (PHI), Preeda Pongseeda (THA)

24 April
16:00

Stats

Laos	52–133	Philippines
Scoring by quarter: 10–32, 5–27, 21–39, 16–35
Pts: Kham Ek 16; Rebs: Thavatay 8 Asts: Phetthavong 1		Pts: Madrigal 23; Rebs: Gozum, Bahio 8 Asts: Flores 8

Medan Basketball Court, Medan
Referees: Rendra Lesmana (INA), Ho Shuet Mei (SIN), Liu Chee Khun (MAS)

24 April
18:00

Stats

Singapore	61–79	Indonesia
Scoring by quarter: 13–15, 19–19, 20–25, 9–20
Pts: Sim 14; Rebs: Tng Z.C. 11; Asts: Shiek Bachamian 2		Pts: Noor 13; Rebs: Saputera 8 Asts: Nathan, Ray 2

Medan Basketball Court, Medan
Referees: Chuang Chih-Chun (TPE), Chu Wei Chuen (MAS), Samphan Kamphusiriphan (THA)

24 April
20:00

Stats

Thailand	64–59	Malaysia
Scoring by quarter: 20–12, 21–17, 13–14, 10–16
Pts: Tabtim 14; Rebs: Suwan 8 Asts: Leelaphipatkul 5		Pts: Heng Y.T. 12; Rebs: Soong K.A. 9 Asts: Lee J.K., Soong K.A. 2

Medan Basketball Court, Medan
Referees: Edmond Ming Tat Ho (HKG), Leong Chuen Wing (SIN), Erwin Harahap (INA)

25 April
16:00

Stats

Laos	47–108	Singapore
Scoring by quarter: 5–29, 8–29, 11–26, 23–24
Pts: Thavatay 10; Rebs: Thavatay, Kham Ek, Soutthichack 5 Asts: Thavatsay, Soutthichack 2		Pts: Sim 22; Rebs: Borhan 10; Asts: Thng Y.A. 6

Medan Basketball Court, Medan
Referees: Glenn Cornelio (PHI), Erwin Harahap (INA), Preeda Pongseeda (THA)

25 April
18:00

Stats

Philippines	87–68	Malaysia
Scoring by quarter: 22–24, 24–16, 20–12, 21–16
Pts: Mamuyac 18; Rebs: Sinclair, Flores 11; Asts: Mamuyac 5		Pts: Soong K.A. 22; Rebs: Tan W.K. 7 Asts: Soong K.A. 3

Medan Basketball Court, Medan
Referees: Edmond Ming Tat Ho (HKG), Mikeo Thongpathoum (LAO), Samphan Kamphusiriphan (THA)

25 April
20:00

Stats

Indonesia	56–57	Thailand
Scoring by quarter: 10–18, 9–17, 22–17, 15–5
Pts: Noor 12; Rebs: Nathan 13; Asts: Ray 2		Pts: Suwan 18; Rebs: Limjittakorn 7 Asts: Limjittakorn 3

Medan Basketball Court, Medan
Referees: Chuang Chih-Chun (TPE), Leong Chuen Wing (SIN), Chu Wei Chuen (MAS)

26 April
16:00

Stats

Thailand	128–73	Laos
Scoring by quarter: 11–19, 31–22, 49–16, 37–16
Pts: Sapakong 24; Rebs: Phithak 11; Asts: Jaimsawad 6		Pts: Thavatsay 24; Rebs: Thavatay, Kham Ek 11; Asts: Phenphet 3

Medan Basketball Court, Medan
Referees: Erwin Harahap (INA), Liu Chee Khun (MAS), Ho Shuet Mei (SIN)

26 April
18:00

Stats

Singapore	52–87	Philippines
Scoring by quarter: 15–25, 6–18, 19–23, 12–21
Pts: Sim, Yeo, Raj 9 Rebs: Raj 7 Asts: seven players 1 each		Pts: Bahio 16; Rebs: Sinclair 9 Asts: Yu 7

Medan Basketball Court, Medan
Referees: Edmond Ming Tat Ho (HKG), Rendra Lesmana (INA), Chu Wei Chuen (MAS)

26 April
20:00

Stats

Malaysia	72–79	Indonesia
Scoring by quarter: 20–10, 12–23, 14–20, 26–26
Pts: Lee J.K. 14; Rebs: Chin M.F. 11; Asts: Lee J.K. 2		Pts: Saputera 29; Rebs: Sunarko 10; Asts: Nathan, Saputera, Ray 2

Medan Basketball Court, Medan
Referees: Chuang Chih-Chun (TPE), Glenn Cornelio (PHI), Preeda Pongseeda (THA)

27 April
16:00

Stats

Laos	65–97	Malaysia
Scoring by quarter: 10–21, 16–18, 23–25, 16–33
Pts: Thavatay 21; Rebs: Thavatay 12; Asts: Phenphet 3		Pts: Lee J.K. 31; Rebs: Chin M.F., Liew Y.H., Tan W.K. 10; Asts: five players 2 each

Medan Basketball Court, Medan
Referees: Samphan Kamphusiriphan (THA), Ho Shuet Mei (SIN), Glenn Cornelio (PHI)

27 April
18:00

Stats

Thailand	69–65	Singapore
Scoring by quarter: 25–15, 17–13, 15–17, 12–20
Pts: Limjittakorn 20; Rebs: Tabtim, Tanrattana Phithak 7 Asts: Suwan 3		Pts: Rengarajan 30; Rebs: Rengarajan 11; Asts: Thng Y.A. 4

Medan Basketball Court, Medan

27 April
20:00

Stats

Indonesia	73–113	Philippines
Scoring by quarter: 18–22, 16–25, 23–36, 16–30
Pts: Noor 14; Rebs: Nikolas 5 Asts: Ray 3		Pts: Sinclair 25; Rebs: Sinclair 10; Asts: Nelle 7

Medan Basketball Court, Medan

== Final round ==
Top three teams qualify to the 2016 FIBA Asia Under-18 Championship.

=== Third place game ===
28 April
17:00

Stats

Indonesia	67–57	Malaysia
Scoring by quarter: 7–7, 16–23, 17–15, 27–12
Pts: Noor 20; Rebs: Nikolas 16; Asts: Noor, Hartono 3		Pts: Tan W.K. 15; Rebs: Chin M.F 12; Asts: five players 1 each

Medan Basketball Court, Medan
Referees: Edmond Ming Tat Ho (HKG), Leong Chuen Wing (SIN), Samphan Kamphusiriphan (THA)

=== Final ===
28 April
19:00

Stats

Philippines	86–49	Thailand
Scoring by quarter: 17–19, 31–13, 25–7, 13–10
Pts: Sinclair 15; Rebs: Bahio 13; Asts: Yu, Bahio 3		Pts: Tabtim 14; Rebs: Tanrattana Phithak 7 Asts: Suwan 2

Medan Basketball Court, Medan
Referees: Chuang Chih-Chun (TPE), Liu Chee Khun (MAS), Erwin Harahap (INA)

== Final standings ==
Qualified for the 2016 FIBA Asia Under-18 Championship

Rank	Team
1st place, gold medalist(s)	Philippines
2nd place, silver medalist(s)	Thailand
3rd place, bronze medalist(s)	Indonesia
4	Malaysia
5	Singapore
6	Laos

== Awards ==
2016 SEABA Under-18 champions

Philippines
Eighth title
