= Ali Mansour (basketball) =

Lebanese basketball player

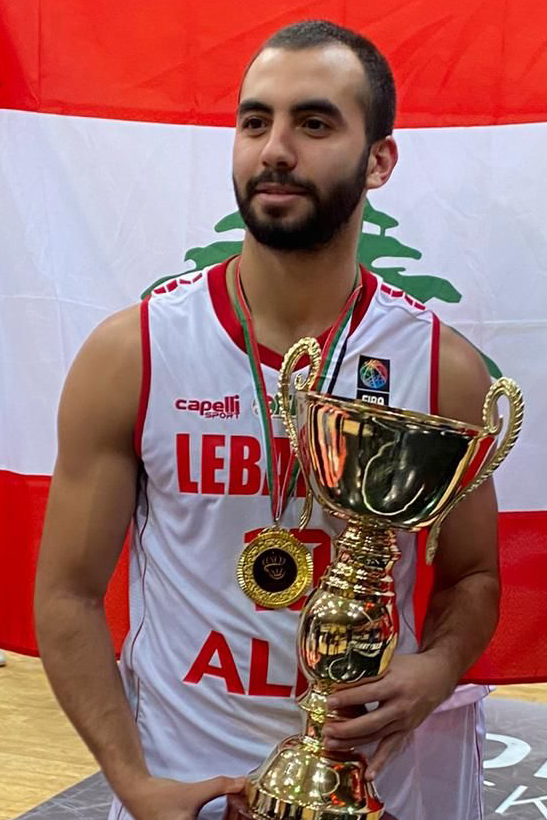
- Ali Mansour in 2022

No. 10 – Al Riyadi
- Position: Point guard
- League: Lebanese Basketball League

Personal information
- Born: 1 January 1998 (age 28) Beirut, Lebanon
- Listed height: 1.85 m (6 ft 1 in)

Career information
- Playing career: 2016–present

Career history
- 2016–2018: Louaize Club
- 2018–2020: Hoops Club
- 2020–2021: Al-Gharafa
- 2021–2022: Naft Al-Shamal
- 2022–present: Al Riyadi
Medals
Men's basketball
Representing Lebanon
FIBA Asia Cup
Silver medal – second place	2022 Jakarta

Ali Mansour (Arabic: علي منصور, 1 January 1998) is a Lebanese professional basketball player for Al Riyadi of the Lebanese Basketball League, and for the Lebanon national team. Mansour was named MVP in the 2016 Under 18 Arab Basketball Championship, and Best point guard in the 2021 Eurasian League Basketball championship. He is widely regarded as one of the best guards in the Lebanese league.

== Early life and education ==
Mansour was born on 1 January 1998. He attended Collège Elite, a French international school in Beirut, and started playing basketball at the age of ten.

In 2014, Mansour received a scholarship to complete his secondary education in the US at the Genesis Academy in Lynchburg, VA, and joined the school's basketball team. The next year, Mansour was offered a scholarship at Conrad Academy in Orlando, FL. He had to drop the scholarship and return to Lebanon to play for the national team in the Under 18 Arab Basketball Championship, and the 2016 FIBA Asia Under-18 Championship.

Mansour graduated from the Lebanese American University in 2021.

== Basketball career ==
=== Junior career ===
Mansour was drafted since his teens in the ranks of the Lebanese national team. In the 2015 Under 18 Arab Basketball Championship, Mansour was pivotal in helping the Lebanon men's national basketball team place second behind the Egypt's national team. The next year, Ali was named the tournament's MVP. In 2016, Mansour played in the FIBA Asia Under-18 Championship, where he was a top scorer for the Lebanese national team, and made it to the top-five players list of the tournament.

=== Professional career ===
Mansour began playing professionally at the age of 18 for Louaize Club and stayed with the team until 2017. He signed with the Hoops Club where he was one of the top scorers; and stayed with the team for two years, where he scored his first triple-double against Sagesse SC in the Lebanese Basketball League championship, recording 18 points, 12 rebounds, and 13 assists. Mansour was named All-Lebanese League Newcomer of the Year for his performance with Hoops.

Between 2020 and 2021, Mansour played for Qatari Al-Gharafa SC, then Iraqi Naft Al-Shamal SC. He joined Al Riyadi Club in 2020, where he plays point guard; the club made first place at the 2021 Eurasian League Basketball championship, and he was named Best Point Guard of the tournament. Mansour was a top scorer for the Lebanon national team in the 2023 FIBA Basketball World Cup qualifiers; the national team qualified to the 2023 World Cup tournament for the first time since 2009, after defeating the Indian national team.
