= Lebanon men's national under-19 basketball team =

Lebanon
- FIBA ranking: 38 ▼2 (Dec 2025)
- Joined FIBA: 1947
- FIBA zone: FIBA Asia
- National federation: FLB
- Coach: Patrick Saba

U19 World Cup
- Appearances: 2
- Medals: None

U18 Asia Cup
- Appearances: 13
- Medals: Bronze: 1 (2006)
Home	Away
Medal record
FIBA Under-18 Asia Cup
Bronze medal – third place	2006

The Lebanon men's national under-18 and under-19 basketball team is a national basketball team of Lebanon, administered by the Lebanese Basketball Federation. It represents the country in international under-18 and under-19 men's basketball competitions.

== History ==
=== World Cup Qualification ===
The Lebanese junior basketball team secured a place in the 2007 FIBA Under-19 World Championship after earning a third-place finish in the 2006 FIBA Asia Under-18 Championship. While they were unable to advance to the second round of the 2007 World Championship, having lost all three of their preliminary games, they managed to win one classification game and ultimately finished 14th out of 16 teams.

The team qualified for the 2022 FIBA U18 Asian Championship Semi-Finals, securing a second appearance in the FIBA Under-19 Basketball World Cup after more than a decade since their last appearance on the world stage. In the 2023 FIBA Under-19 Basketball World Cup, Lebanon men's U19 team concluded the competition in 15th place out of 16 teams, winning their last game against the host nation, Hungary, by a score of 73–66.

== Tournament records ==
=== FIBA U19 World Cup ===
FIBA U19 World Cup
Year	Pos	Pld	W	L
1979 to 2003	Did not qualify			
(Serbia) 2007	14th	5	1	4
2009 to 2021	Did not qualify			
(Hungary) 2023	15th	7	1	6
(Switzerland) 2025	Did not qualify			
(Czech Republic) 2027	Did not qualify			
(Indonesia) 2029	To be determined			
Total	2/19	12	2	10

=== FIBA U18 Asia Cup ===
FIBA U18 Asia Cup
Year	Pos	Pld	W	L
1970 to 1996	Did not participate			
(India) 1998	13th	7	3	4
(Malaysia) 2000	10th	7	3	4
(Kuwait) 2002	9th	5	4	1
(India) 2004	4th	8	5	3
(China) 2006	3rd	8	6	2
(Iran) 2008	8th	8	4	4
(Yemen) 2010	7th	9	4	5
(Mongolia) 2012	7th	9	4	5
(Qatar) 2014	Did not participate			
(Iran) 2016	4th	8	5	3
(Thailand) 2018	10th	4	1	3
(Iran) 2022	4th	5	2	3
(Jordan) 2024	9th	4	2	2
(India) 2026	13th	3	0	3
Total	13/29	85	43	42

=== West Asian Basketball Championship U18 ===
WABA U18
Year	Pos	Pld	W	L
(Jordan) 2018	2nd	4	2	2
(Syria) 2022	1st	5	5	0
(Iraq) 2024	2nd	4	3	1
(Jordan) 2026	1st	5	5	0
Total		18	15	3

== See also ==
- Sport in Lebanon
- Lebanon men's national basketball team
- Lebanon men's national under-17 basketball team
- Lebanon women's national basketball team
- Lebanon women's national under-18 basketball team
- Lebanon women's national under-16 basketball team
