= 2016 FIBA Asia Under-18 Championship =

24th FIBA Under-18 Asian Basketball Championship

Tournament details
- Host country: Iran
- City: Tehran
- Dates: July 22–31
- Teams: 12 (from 1 confederation)
- Venue: 1 (in 1 host city)

Final positions
- Champions: Iran (3rd title)
- Runners-up: Japan
- Third place: South Korea

Tournament statistics
- Top scorer: (Iraq) Al-Zuhairi (32.0)
- Top rebounds: (Iraq) Al-Zuhairi (18.5)
- Top assists: (South Korea) Park (5.2)
- PPG (Team): South Korea (87.6)
- RPG (Team): China (58.6)
- APG (Team): South Korea (17.9)

Official website
- www.fiba.basketball/history

The 2016 FIBA Asia Under-18 Championship was the 24th edition of the Asian basketball championship for under-18 men. The tournament was held in Tehran, Iran, from 22 to 31 July 2016. It also served as a qualification for the 2017 FIBA Under-19 World Championship in Egypt, where the top three teams qualified. This was the second time the country hosted the tournament after successfully staging the 20th edition eight years ago.

Iran as the host team won the tournament after defeating Japan in the final, 71–65, to secure their third FIBA Asia Under-18 Championship title.

== Qualification ==
=== Allocation of berths ===
According to FIBA Asia rules, the number of participating teams in the FIBA Asia Under-18 Championship was set at 16. The hosts and the defending champions qualified automatically. All FIBA Asia subzones got two berths each, except for the Central and South Asian subzones, which got one berth each. The last four berths were allocated to subzones based on their teams' results in the 2014 FIBA Asia Under-18 Championship.

Allocation of berths
Subzone	Automatic qualifiers		Default berths	Additional berths as 3rd–6th place teams from last championship	Total
Subzone	Hosts	Defending champions	Default berths	Additional berths as 3rd–6th place teams from last championship	Total
Central Asia	0	0	1	0	1
East Asia	0	1	2	3	6
Gulf	0	0	2	0	2
South Asia	0	0	1	0	1
Southeast Asia	0	0	2	1	3
West Asia	1	0	2	0	3
Total	1	1	10	4	16

=== Qualified teams ===
Central Asia (1)	East Asia (2+1+3)	Gulf (2)	South Asia (1)	Southeast Asia (2+1)	West Asia (2+1)
Kazakhstan	China	N/A^{[Note 2]}	India	Philippines	Iran
	South Korea	N/A^{[Note 2]}		Thailand	Iraq
	Japan			Indonesia	Lebanon
	Chinese Taipei				
	N/A^{[Note 1]}				
	N/A^{[Note 1]}				

^{Note 1} Only four teams from the East Asia subzone entered despite being allocated six berths.
^{Note 2} No teams from the Gulf subzone entered despite being allocated two berths.

== Draw ==
Eventually, only 12 teams participated in this tournament. The FIBA Boys' World Rankings as of 31 December 2015 are shown in parentheses.

Group A	Group B
China (12); Chinese Taipei (27); Philippines (28); India (52); Iraq (62); Thailand (67)	Iran (24); South Korea (18); Japan (26); Kazakhstan (37); Indonesia (70); Lebanon (54)

== Venue ==
This year's tournament was held at the Twelve Thousand People Sport Hall, located in the north & south of the main street of the Azadi Sport Complex.

== Preliminary round ==
All times are in Iran Standard Time (UTC+04:30)

=== Group A ===
Pos	Team	Pld	W	L	PF	PA	PD	Pts	Qualification
1	China	5	5	0	466	282	+184	10	Advance to quarterfinals
2	Chinese Taipei	5	4	1	428	354	+74	9	Advance to quarterfinals
3	Philippines	5	2	3	412	418	−6	7 (Note: Philippines 105-82 India)	Advance to quarterfinals
4	India	5	2	3	420	480	−60	7	Advance to quarterfinals
5	Iraq	5	1	4	343	457	−114	6 (Note: Thailand 76-92 Iraq)	Eliminated
6	Thailand	5	1	4	360	438	−78	6	Eliminated

Source: FIBA Asia
Rules for classification: (1) Tournament points, (2) Head-to-head tournament points, (3) Head-to-head goal average, (4) Overall goal average, (5) Drawing of lots
Notes:

22 July
12:00

Box Scores

Iraq	28–93	China
Scoring by quarter: 9–20, 3–21, 10–27, 6–25
Pts: Al-Saedi 12; Rebs: Fadhil 8 Asts: 0		Pts: Liu 16; Rebs: Li 11; Asts: Man 4

Azadi Basketball Hall, Tehran
Referees: Walid Marcel Abirached (LIB), Lee Seung-Mu (KOR), Mohsen Roshan Zamir (IRI)

22 July
16:00

Box Scores

India	100–93	Thailand
Scoring by quarter: 29–21, 28–22, 18–20, 25–30
Pts: Sahil 22; Rebs: Gupta 14; Asts: Poiyamozhi 5		Pts: Bassey 20; Rebs: Bassey 6 Asts: Leelaphipatkul 4

Azadi Basketball Hall, Tehran
Referees: Hadi Salem (IRI), Johan Christiana (INA), Yasuhisa Masubuchi (JPN)

22 July
20:00

Box Scores

Philippines	74–88	Chinese Taipei
Scoring by quarter: 18–19, 11–30, 16–21, 29–18
Pts: Tibayan 15; Rebs: Sinclair 9 Asts: Mendoza, Gallego 3		Pts: Kao K.H., Ting S.J. 16; Rebs: Tseng H.C. 13; Asts: Kao K.H. 3

Azadi Basketball Hall, Tehran
Referees: Shigeyuki Arisawa (JPN), Shin Gi-Rok (KOR), Alexey Stepanenko (KAZ)

23 July
12:00

Box Scores

China	106–66	India
Scoring by quarter: 17–21, 30–10, 26–18, 33–17
Pts: Taruike 20; Rebs: Fan 9 Asts: Fan 3		Pts: Ragupathy 31; Rebs: Ragupathy 8 Asts: Poiyamozhi 3

Azadi Basketball Hall, Tehran
Referees: Lee Seung-Mu (KOR), Johan Christiana (INA), Mohammad Rajabiozoodi (IRI)

23 July
16:00

Box Scores

Iraq	79–96	Philippines
Scoring by quarter: 17–26, 22–30, 21–25, 19–15
Pts: Al-Zuhairi 39; Rebs: Al-Zuhairi 24; Asts: Fadhil 2		Pts: Mendoza 25; Rebs: Sinclair 12; Asts: Gallego 6

Azadi Basketball Hall, Tehran
Referees: Alexey Stepanenko (KAZ), Yasuhisa Masubuchi (JPN), Shin Gi-Rok (KOR)

23 July
20:00

Box Scores

Thailand	66–77	Chinese Taipei
Scoring by quarter: 17–22, 18–13, 14–24, 17–18
Pts: Bassey 33; Rebs: Bassey 17; Asts: Suwan 4		Pts: Hsieh 17; Rebs: Tseng 11; Asts: Ting 4

Azadi Basketball Hall, Tehran
Referees: Rabah Noujaim (LIB), Hamlet Arakelyan (KAZ), Zhoobin Jalili (IRI)

24 July
12:00

Box Scores

Philippines	66–95	China
Scoring by quarter: 14–29, 19–20, 13–21, 20–25
Pts: Mendoza 19; Rebs: Bahio 5 Asts: Mamuyac 4		Pts: Du 17; Rebs: Xiang Li 10; Asts: Tang 4

Azadi Basketball Hall, Tehran
Referees: Hamlet Arakelyan (KAZ), Seungmu Lee (KOR), Mohsen Roshan Zamir (IRI)

24 July
16:00

Box Scores

Chinese Taipei	93–79	India
Scoring by quarter: 22–19, 21–15, 28–22, 22–23
Pts: Kao 16; Rebs: Tseng 13; Asts: Jian 4		Pts: Ragupathy 21; Rebs: Gupta 15; Asts: Poiyamozhi 3

Azadi Basketball Hall, Tehran
Referees: Walid Abirached (LIB), Hadi Salem (IRI), Alexey Stepanenko (KAZ)

24 July
20:00

Box Scores

Thailand	76–92	Iraq
Scoring by quarter: 14–18, 24–21, 14–21, 24–32
Pts: Banchathon 23; Rebs: Bassey 14; Asts: Leelaphipatkul 6		Pts: Al-Zuhairi 45; Rebs: Al-Zuhairi 24; Asts: Abbas 6

Azadi Basketball Hall, Tehran
Referees: Rabah Noujaim (LIB), Shigeyuki Arisawa (JPN), Gi-Rok Shin (KOR)

26 July
12:00

Box Scores

China	74–71	Chinese Taipei
Scoring by quarter: 15–16, 18–24, 19–25, 22–6
Pts: Taruike 19; Rebs: Fan 12; Asts: Wang 4		Pts: Kao 27; Rebs: Tseng 6 Asts: Ting 5

Azadi Basketball Hall, Tehran
Referees: Rabah Noujaim (LIB), Johan Christiana (INA), Mohsen Roshan Zamir (IRI)

26 July
16:00

Box Scores

Philippines	71–74	Thailand
Scoring by quarter: 18–20, 13–13, 25–24, 15–17
Pts: Mendoza 22; Rebs: Gallego 8 Asts: Mamuyac 3		Pts: Bassey 34; Rebs: Bassey 21; Asts: Bassey 5

Azadi Basketball Hall, Tehran
Referees: Walid Abirached (LIB), Shigeyuki Arisawa (JPN), Gi-Rok Shin (KOR)

26 July
20:00

Box Scores

India	93–83 (OT)	Iraq
Scoring by quarter: 21–16, 19–16, 21–19, 16–26, Overtime: 16–6
Pts: Poiyamozhi 31; Rebs: Gupta 14; Asts: Poiyamozhi 6		Pts: Al-Zuhairi 23; Rebs: Al-Zuhairi 8 Asts: Al-Zuhairi 5

Azadi Basketball Hall, Tehran
Referees: Hamlet Arakelyan (KAZ), Zhoobin Jalili (IRI), Yasuhisa Masubuchi (JPN)

27 July
12:00

Box Scores

China	98–51	Thailand
Scoring by quarter: 31–10, 26–19, 16–13, 25–9
Pts: Du 18; Rebs: Li 18; Asts: Hu 18		Pts: Bassey 19; Rebs: Bassey 11; Asts: Bassey 3

Azadi Basketball Hall, Tehran
Referees: Hadi Salem (IRI), Walid Abirached (LIB), Seungmu Lee (KOR)

27 July
16:00

Box Scores

Chinese Taipei	99–61	Iraq
Scoring by quarter: 29–11, 20–17, 28–11, 22–22
Pts: Chen 13; Rebs: Huang 8 Asts: Kao 5		Pts: Al-Zuhairi 21; Rebs: Al-Zuhairi 18; Asts: Al-Zuhairi 3

Azadi Basketball Hall, Tehran
Referees: Alexey Stepanenko (KAZ), Johan Christiana (INA), Yasuhisa Masubuchi (JPN)

27 July
20:00

Box Scores

Philippines	105–82	India
Scoring by quarter: 30–21, 21–18, 28–18, 26–25
Pts: Mendoza 23; Rebs: Sinclair 8 Asts: Gallego 7		Pts: Arthur Wilson 16; Rebs: Gupta 11; Asts: Hansraj 3

Azadi Basketball Hall, Tehran
Referees: Rabah Noujaim (LIB), Hamlet Arakelyan (KAZ), Shigeyuki Arisawa (JPN)

=== Group B ===
Pos	Team	Pld	W	L	PF	PA	PD	Pts	Qualification
1	Lebanon	5	4	1	407	266	+141	9 (Note: Lebanon 80-67 Korea)	Advance to quarterfinals
2	South Korea	5	4	1	457	357	+100	9	Advance to quarterfinals
3	Japan	5	3	2	415	374	+41	8 (Note: Japan 81-77 IR Iran)	Advance to quarterfinals
4	Iran (H)	5	3	2	432	320	+112	8	Advance to quarterfinals
5	Kazakhstan	5	1	4	320	451	−131	6	Eliminated
6	Indonesia	5	0	5	246	509	−263	5	Eliminated

Source: FIBA Asia
Rules for classification: (1) Tournament points, (2) Head-to-head tournament points, (3) Head-to-head goal average, (4) Overall goal average, (5) Drawing of lots
(H) Hosts
Notes:

22 July
10:00

Box Scores

Kazakhstan	37–97	Lebanon
Scoring by quarter: 11–24, 11–27, 7–25, 8–21
Pts: Lachsh 11; Rebs: Nagimov 8 Asts: Zhunussov 2		Pts: Alaaeddine 23; Rebs: Alkhoury 13; Asts: Assi, Mansour 4

Azadi Basketball Hall, Tehran
Referees: Joenard Garcia (PHI), Nattapong Jontapa (THA), Zhang Xiao (CHN)

22 July
14:00

Box Scores

Japan	72–92	South Korea
Scoring by quarter: 17–18, 12–19, 9–35, 34–20
Pts: Schafer 12; Rebs: Nishida 8 Asts: Mikami 3		Pts: Shin 24; Rebs: Shin 12; Asts: Park 6

Azadi Basketball Hall, Tehran
Referees: Yevgeniy Mikheyev (KAZ), Ramesh Koppanathi (IND), Zhu Haiying (CHN)

22 July
18:45

Box Scores

Indonesia	40–106	Iran
Scoring by quarter: 9–28, 6–23, 12–25, 13–30
Pts: Saputera, Sutrisno 10; Rebs: Nikolas 7 Asts: three players 1		Pts: Jafari 21; Rebs: Kamalvand 10; Asts: Samadi 4

Azadi Basketball Hall, Tehran
Referees: Imran Ali Baig (IND), Hawar Mohammed (IRQ), Wei Sheng-hsuan (TPE)

23 July
10:00

Box Scores

Indonesia	54–113	Japan
Scoring by quarter: 11–26, 17–21, 8–38, 18–28
Pts: Saputera 12; Rebs: Nikolas 11; Asts: Nikolas 2		Pts: Sugimoto 29; Rebs: Schafer 11; Asts: Mizuno 6

Azadi Basketball Hall, Tehran
Referees: Joenard Garcia (PHI), Ramesh Koppanathi (IND), Hawar Mohammed (IRQ)

23 July
14:00

Box Scores

Lebanon	80–67	South Korea
Scoring by quarter: 24–19, 19–16, 14–19, 23–13
Pts: Mansour 15; Rebs: Ozeir 14; Asts: Mansour 6		Pts: Yang 20; Rebs: Ha 13; Asts: Shin 3

Azadi Basketball Hall, Tehran
Referees: Yevgeniy Mikheyev (KAZ), Nattapong Jontapa (THA), Zhu Haiying (CHN)

23 July
18:00

Box Scores

Iran	90–59	Kazakhstan
Scoring by quarter: 19–14, 28–12, 28–22, 15–11
Pts: Jafari 25; Rebs: Rezaei 9 Asts: Seyedi 4		Pts: Timofeyev 15; Rebs: Timofeyev 11; Asts: Zhunussov 3

Azadi Basketball Hall, Tehran
Referees: Imran Ali Baig (IND), Wei Sheng-hsuan (TPE), Zhang Xiao (CHN)

24 July
10:00

Box Scores

South Korea	105–66	Kazakhstan
Scoring by quarter: 24–15, 14–14, 30–19, 37–18
Pts: Han 17; Rebs: Shin 11; Asts: Park 8		Pts: Timofeyev 19; Rebs: Timofeyev 14; Asts: Zhunussov 4

Azadi Basketball Hall, Tehran
Referees: Imran Ali Baig (IND), Hawar Mohammed (IRQ), Xiao Zhang (CHN)

24 July
14:00

Box Scores

Lebanon	103–35	Indonesia
Scoring by quarter: 29–6, 23–15, 33–9, 18–5
Pts: Mansour 19; Rebs: Zeinoun 8 Asts: Assi 9		Pts: Hartono 13; Rebs: Nikolus 6 Asts: Noor 2

Azadi Basketball Hall, Tehran
Referees: Yevgeniy Mikheyev (KAZ), Sheng-Hsuan Wei (TPE), Haiying Zhu (CHN)

24 July
18:00

Box Scores

Japan	81–77	Iran
Scoring by quarter: 26–25, 18–20, 13–9, 24–23
Pts: Sugimoto 24; Rebs: Masuda 9 Asts: Ito 5		Pts: Azari 19; Rebs: Khandanpoor 12; Asts: Seyedi 2

Azadi Basketball Hall, Tehran
Referees: Joenard Garcia (PHI), Nattapong Jontapa (THA), Ramesh Koppanathi (IND)

26 July
10:00

Box Scores

Japan	51–73	Lebanon
Scoring by quarter: 9–18, 9–15, 24–17, 9–23
Pts: Nishida 16; Rebs: Masuda 6 Asts: Ito 4		Pts: Alkhoury 13; Rebs: Mansour 11; Asts: Assi 6

Azadi Basketball Hall, Tehran
Referees: Joenard Garcia (PHI), Ramesh Koppanathi (IND), Xiao Zhang (CHN)

26 July
14:00

Box Scores

Kazakhstan	80–61	Indonesia
Scoring by quarter: 8–13, 30–10, 16–20, 26–18
Pts: Timofeyev 17; Rebs: Parfenov 16; Asts: Romanenko 4		Pts: Saputera 19; Rebs: Nikolas 8 Asts: Ray 4

Azadi Basketball Hall, Tehran
Referees: Hawar Mohammed (IRQ), Sheng-Hsuan Wei (TPE), Haiying Zhu (CHN)

26 July
18:00

Box Scores

Iran	83–86	South Korea
Scoring by quarter: 12–12, 25–12, 21–36, 25–26
Pts: Khandapoor 16; Rebs: Rezaei 10; Asts: Rezaei 3		Pts: J. Kim 25; Rebs: J.M. Yang 10; Asts: J. Park 3

Azadi Basketball Hall, Tehran
Referees: Yevgeniy Mikheyev (KAZ), Imran Ali Baig (IND), Nattapong Jontapa (THA)

27 July
10:00

Box Scores

Japan	98–78	Kazakhstan
Scoring by quarter: 18–20, 25–16, 28–28, 27–14
Pts: Sugimoto 43; Rebs: Sugimoto 7 Asts: Mikami 4		Pts: Parfenov 23; Rebs: Timofeyev 15; Asts: Lachsh 4

Azadi Basketball Hall, Tehran
Referees: Hawar Mohammed (IRQ), Nattapong Jontapa (THA), Ramesh Koppanathi (IND)

27 July
14:00

Box Scores

South Korea	107–56	Indonesia
Scoring by quarter: 24–15, 27–9, 32–13, 24–19
Pts: J. Kim 18; Rebs: J. Park 9 Asts: J. Park 8		Pts: Noor 12; Rebs: Titoaji 6 Asts: Noor 1

Azadi Basketball Hall, Tehran
Referees: Haiying Zhu (CHN), Imran Ali Baig (IND), Sheng-Hsuan Wei (TPE)

27 July
18:00

Box Scores

Iran	76–54	Lebanon
Scoring by quarter: 22–9, 22–17, 12–9, 20–19
Pts: Samadi 13; Rebs: Khandapoor 9 Asts: Rezaei 3		Pts: Alkhoury 14; Rebs: El Dani 7 Asts: Assi 4

Azadi Basketball Hall, Tehran
Referees: Yevgeniy Mikheyev (KAZ), Joenard Garcia (PHI), Xiao Zhang (CHN)

== Final round ==
5th-place game
A1	China	76
A2	Chinese Taipei	70
7th-place game
A3	Philippines	67
A4	India	64

5th-8th-place semifinals
A1	China	85
A3	Philippines	55
A4	India	66
A2	Chinese Taipei	97

Quarterfinals
A1	China	59
B4	Iran	62
B2	South Korea	93
A3	Philippines	85
B1	Lebanon	98
A4	India	67
A2	Chinese Taipei	71
B3	Japan	77

Semifinals
B4	Iran	87
B2	South Korea	65
B1	Lebanon	59
B3	Japan	75

Final
B4	Iran	71
B3	Japan	65
Bronze-medal match
B2	South Korea	86
B1	Lebanon	63

=== Quarterfinals ===
July 29
12:00

Box Scores

South Korea	93–85	Philippines
Scoring by quarter: 28–31, 19–16, 20–20, 26–18
Pts: Han 24; Rebs: J.W. Park, Ha 8 Asts: J.W. Park 4		Pts: Mendoza 19; Rebs: Carino 12; Asts: Mendoza, Yu 4

Azadi Basketball Hall, Tehran
Referees: Rabah Noujaim (LIB), Walid Marcel Abirached (LIB), Hawar Mohammed (IRQ)

July 29
14:00

Box Scores

Chinese Taipei	71–77	Japan
Scoring by quarter: 20–17, 16–24, 17–19, 18–17
Pts: Kao, Chou 17; Rebs: Tseng 8 Asts: Kao 3		Pts: Nishida 24; Rebs: Mimori, Masuda 8 Asts: Masuda, Nishida 3

Azadi Basketball Hall, Tehran
Referees: Joenard Garcia (PHI), Seungmu Lee (KOR), Hadi Salem (IRI)

July 29
16:00

Box Scores

Lebanon	98–67	India
Scoring by quarter: 23–21, 26–9, 21–20, 28–17
Pts: Alkhoury 18; Rebs: Alkhoury, Ozeir 10; Asts: Mansour 6		Pts: Benny 19; Rebs: Gupta 9 Asts: Poiyamozhi 6

Azadi Basketball Hall, Tehran
Referees: Alexey Stepanenko (KAZ), Hamlet Arakelyan (KAZ), Nattapong Jontapa (THA)

July 29
18:00

Box Scores

China	59–62	Iran
Scoring by quarter: 19–23, 11–10, 8–15, 21–14
Pts: Man 21; Rebs: Hu 8 Asts: Hu 6		Pts: Jafari 21; Rebs: Khandanpoor 9 Asts: Samadi 3

Azadi Basketball Hall, Tehran
Referees: Yevgeniy Mikheyev (KAZ), Imran Ali Baig (IND), Yasuhisa Masubuchi (JPN)

=== 5th-8th-place semifinals ===
July 30
12:00

Box Scores

Philippines	55–85	China
Scoring by quarter: 10–21, 23–21, 11–21, 11–22
Pts: Flores 12; Rebs: Mamuyac 7 Asts: Gallego, Yu 3		Pts: Fan 17; Rebs: Fan 11; Asts: Hu 7

Azadi Basketball Hall, Tehran
Referees: Hadi Salem (IRI), Walid Abirached (LIB), Zhoobin Jalili (IRI)

July 30
14:00

Box Scores

Chinese Taipei	97–66	India
Scoring by quarter: 27–12, 27–17, 24–16, 19–21
Pts: Jian 16; Rebs: Wang 11; Asts: Chen 8		Pts: Ragupathy 13; Rebs: Benny 8 Asts: Poiyamozhi 3

Azadi Basketball Hall, Tehran
Referees: Rahab Noujaim (LIB), Johan Christiana (INA), Mohammad Rajabiozoodi (IRI)

=== Semifinals ===
July 30
16:00

Box Scores

Japan	75–59	Lebanon
Scoring by quarter: 14–22, 22–11, 19–11, 20–15
Pts: Masuda 29; Rebs: Mimori 12; Asts: four players 2		Pts: Mansour 17; Rebs: Mansour 8 Asts: Mansour 3

Azadi Basketball Hall, Tehran
Referees: Alexey Stepanenko (KAZ), Hamlet Arakelyan (KAZ), Imran Ali Baig (IND)

July 30
18:00

Box Scores

South Korea	65–87	Iran
Scoring by quarter: 19–21, 11–24, 20–21, 15–21
Pts: Han 16; Rebs: Han, J. Yang 4 Asts: J. Park 7		Pts: Khandanpoor 17; Rebs: Khandanpoor 21; Asts: Samadi 5

Azadi Basketball Hall, Tehran
Referees: Yevgeniy Mikheyev (KAZ), Joenard Garcia (PHI), Nattapong Jontapa (THA)

=== 7th-place game ===
July 31
12:00

Box Scores

Philippines	67–64	India
Scoring by quarter: 26–14, 12–14, 16–23, 13–13
Pts: Mendoza 15; Rebs: Tibayan, Bahio 8 Asts: three players 3		Pts: Gupta 20; Rebs: Benny 12; Asts: Gupta, Ragupathy 2

Azadi Basketball Hall, Tehran
Referees: Gi Rok Shin (KOR), Shigeyuki Arisawa (JPN), Haiying Zhu (CHN)

=== 5th-place game ===
July 31
14:00

Box Scores

China	76–70	Chinese Taipei
Scoring by quarter: 17–14, 22–28, 15–13, 22–15
Pts: Fan 31; Rebs: Fan 10; Asts: Hu 3		Pts: Chou 17; Rebs: Tseng, Chou 4 Asts: Ting 4

Azadi Basketball Hall, Tehran
Referees: Seungmu Lee (KOR), Yasuhisa Masubuchi (JPN), Mohammad Rajabiozoodi (IRI)

=== Bronze-medal match ===
July 31
16:00

Box Scores

Lebanon	63–86	South Korea
Scoring by quarter: 16–18, 12–22, 10–18, 25–28
Pts: Zeinoun 19; Rebs: Zeinoun 10; Asts: Riazk 3		Pts: J. Yang 26; Rebs: J. Park, J. Yang 8 Asts: J. Park 3

Azadi Basketball Hall, Tehran
Referees: Yevgeniy Mikheyev (KAZ), Hamlet Arakelyan (KAZ), Alexey Stepanenko (KAZ)

=== Final ===
July 31
18:00

Box Scores

Japan	65–71	Iran
Scoring by quarter: 18-23, 8-12, 14-17, 25-19
Pts: Masuda 35; Rebs: Masuda 9 Asts: Ito 2		Pts: Rezaei 18; Rebs: Rezaiefar 12; Asts: Khandanpoor 5

Azadi Basketball Hall, Tehran
Referees: Joenard Garcia (PHI), Imran Ali Baig (IND), Johan Christiana (INA)

== Referees ==
The following referees were selected for the tournament.

- (Iran) Hadi Salem
- (Iran) Zhoobin Jalili
- (Iran) Mohsen Roushan Zamir
- (China) Zhu Haiying
- (Indonesia) Johan Christiana
- (India) Imran Ali Baig
- (Iraq) Hawar Mohammed
- (Japan) Shigeyuki Arisawa
- (Kazakhstan) Arsen Andryushkin
- (Kazakhstan) Hamlet Arakelyan
- (Kazakhstan) Yevgeniy Mikheyev
- (Kazakhstan) Alexey Stepanenko
- (South Korea) Lee Seung-Mu
- (Lebanon) Rabah Noujaim
- (Philippines) Joenard Garcia
- (Thailand) Nattapong Jontapa
- (Chinese Taipei) Wei Sheng-Hsuan

== Final rankings ==
Qualified for the 2017 FIBA Under-19 World Championship

Position	Team	Record
1st place, gold medalist(s)	Iran	6–2
2nd place, silver medalist(s)	Japan	5–3
3rd place, bronze medalist(s)	South Korea	6–2
4th	Lebanon	5–3
5th	China	7–1
6th	Chinese Taipei	5–3
7th	Philippines	3–5
8th	India	2–6
9th	Iraq	1–4
10th	Kazakhstan	1–4
11th	Thailand	1–4
12th	Indonesia	0–5
