= 1974 ABC Under-18 Championship =

1974 FIBA U18 Asia Cup
3rd FIBA Under-18 Asian Basketball Championship

Tournament details
- Host country: Philippines
- Dates: December 1–15
- Teams: 9 (from all Asian federations)
- Venues: 2 (in 2 host cities)

Final positions
- Champions: Philippines (3rd title)

The 1974 ABC Under-18 Championship was the third edition of the Asian Basketball Confederation (ABC)'s junior championship. The games were held at Manila, Philippines from December 1–15, 1974.

The Philippines successfully defended their championship by sweeping all of their assignments, blasting South Korea, 89-79, in the final day, en route to their third title.

== Preliminary round ==
Team	Pld	W	L	Pts
Philippines	7	7	0	14
South Korea	7	5	2	12
Taiwan	7	5	2	12
Thailand	7	5	2	12
Malaysia	7	3	4	10
Hong Kong	7	2	5	9
Iran	7	1	6	8
Singapore	7	0	7	7
Khmer Republic	0	0	0	0

December 1

Report

South Korea	118–49	Hong Kong
Scoring by half: 50−19, 68−30

Rizal Memorial Coliseum, Manila

December 1

Report

Iran	40–108	Philippines
Scoring by half: 16−67, 24−41

Rizal Memorial Coliseum, Manila

December 2

Report

Iran	51–126	South Korea
Scoring by half: 21−51, 30−75

Rizal Memorial Coliseum, Manila

December 2

Report

Thailand	87–86	Taiwan
Scoring by half: 41−46, 46−40

Rizal Memorial Coliseum, Manila

December 2

Report

Hong Kong	58–99	Malaysia
Scoring by half: 31−46, 27−53

Rizal Memorial Coliseum, Manila

December 3

Report

Hong Kong	70–126	Thailand
Scoring by half: 29−65, 41−61

Rizal Memorial Coliseum, Manila

December 3

Report

South Korea	84–92	Taiwan
Scoring by half: 41−49, 43−43

Rizal Memorial Coliseum, Manila

December 3

Report

Philippines	118–89	Malaysia
Scoring by half: 76−50, 42−39

Rizal Memorial Coliseum, Manila

December 4

Report

Singapore	60–71	Iran
Scoring by half: 25−34, 35−37

Rizal Memorial Coliseum, Manila

December 4

Report

Malaysia	84–94	Taiwan
Scoring by half: 38−55, 46−39

Rizal Memorial Coliseum, Manila

December 4

Report

Thailand	70–85	Philippines
Scoring by half: 31−39, 39−46

Rizal Memorial Coliseum, Manila

December 5

Report

Iran	63–79	Hong Kong
Scoring by half: 30−43, 33−36

Rizal Memorial Coliseum, Manila

December 5

Report

Singapore	54–124	South Korea
Scoring by half: 22−57, 32−67

Rizal Memorial Coliseum, Manila

December 6

Thailand	100–79	Malaysia
Scoring by half: 50−40, 50−39

Rizal Memorial Coliseum, Manila

December 6

Report

Hong Kong	80–67	Singapore
Scoring by half: 35−33, 45−34

Rizal Memorial Coliseum, Manila

December 6

Taiwan	113–83	Iran
Scoring by half: 48−35, 65−48

Rizal Memorial Coliseum, Manila

December 6

South Korea	80–86	Philippines
Scoring by half: 45−38, 35−48

Rizal Memorial Coliseum, Manila

December 7

Report

Malaysia	72–84	South Korea

Rizal Memorial Coliseum, Manila

December 7

Hong Kong	65–112	Taiwan

Rizal Memorial Coliseum, Manila

December 7

Report

Philippines	137–63	Singapore
Scoring by half: 62−29, 75−34

Rizal Memorial Coliseum, Manila

December 8

Report

Singapore	69–103	Thailand
Scoring by half: 23−55, 46−48

Rizal Memorial Coliseum, Manila

December 8

Report

Taiwan	87–98	Philippines
Scoring by half: 41−42, 46−56

Rizal Memorial Coliseum, Manila

December 9

Report

Malaysia	95–30	Singapore
Scoring by half: 46−18, 49−12

Rizal Memorial Coliseum, Manila

December 9

Report

Thailand	94–81	Iran
Scoring by half: 43−38, 51−43

Rizal Memorial Coliseum, Manila

December 9

Report

Philippines	146–63	Hong Kong
Scoring by half: 65−32, 81−31

Rizal Memorial Coliseum, Manila

December 10

Report

Iran	63–102	Malaysia

Rizal Memorial Coliseum, Manila

December 10

Report

Singapore	70–113	Taiwan
Scoring by half: 35−60, 35−53

Rizal Memorial Coliseum, Manila

December 10

Report

South Korea	100–77	Thailand
Scoring by half: 51−35, 49−42

Rizal Memorial Coliseum, Manila

== Final round ==
=== Classification 5th–9th ===
Team	Pld	W	L	Pts
Malaysia	4	4	0	8
Khmer Republic	4	3	1	7
Iran	4	2	2	6
Hong Kong	4	1	3	5
Singapore	4	0	4	4

December 8

Report

Khmer Republic	85–79	Iran
Scoring by half: 49−26, 36−53

Rizal Memorial Coliseum, Manila

December 11

Report

Iran	71–61	Singapore
Scoring by half: 38−24, 33−37

Araneta Coliseum, Quezon City

December 11

Hong Kong	L–W	Malaysia

Araneta Coliseum, Quezon City

December 12

Report

Iran	72–63	Hong Kong

Araneta Coliseum, Quezon City

December 12

Report

Malaysia	123–82	Khmer Republic

Araneta Coliseum, Quezon City

December 13

Report

Khmer Republic	90–89	Singapore
Scoring by half: 41−38, 49−51

Araneta Coliseum, Quezon City

December 13

Report

Malaysia	96–52	Iran

Araneta Coliseum, Quezon City

December 14

Report

Singapore	57–81	Malaysia

Araneta Coliseum, Quezon City

December 14

Report

Hong Kong	68–82	Khmer Republic
Scoring by half: 30−42, 38−40

Araneta Coliseum, Quezon City

December 15

Report

Singapore	60–70	Hong Kong
Scoring by half: 23−44, 37−26

Araneta Coliseum, Quezon City

=== Championship ===
Team	Pld	W	L	Pts
Philippines	3	3	0	6
South Korea	3	2	1	5
Taiwan	3	1	2	4
Thailand	3	0	3	3

December 12

South Korea	86–79	Taiwan
Scoring by half: 49−31, 37−48

Araneta Coliseum, Quezon City

December 12

Report

Philippines	105–74	Thailand
Scoring by half: 52−43, 53−31

Araneta Coliseum, Quezon City

December 13

Report

Thailand	54–73	South Korea
Scoring by half: 29−39, 25−34

Araneta Coliseum, Quezon City

December 13

Report

Taiwan	75–77	Philippines
Scoring by half: 42−38, 33−39

Araneta Coliseum, Quezon City

December 14

Report

Taiwan	111–75	Thailand

Araneta Coliseum, Quezon City

December 15

Report

Philippines	89–79	South Korea
Scoring by half: 47−47, 42−32

Araneta Coliseum, Quezon City

== Final standing ==
Rank	Team	Record
1st place, gold medalist(s)	Philippines	10–0
2nd place, silver medalist(s)	South Korea	7–3
3rd place, bronze medalist(s)	Taiwan	6–4
4	Thailand	5–5
5	Malaysia	7–4
6	Khmer Republic	3–1
7	Iran	3–8
8	Hong Kong	3–8
9	Singapore	0–11

== Awards ==
1974 Asian Under-18 champions

Philippines
Third title
