= Iran men's national under-19 basketball team =

Iran
- FIBA ranking: 28 ▼5 (as of December 2025)
- Joined FIBA: 1947
- FIBA zone: FIBA Asia
- National federation: Islamic Republic of Iran Basketball Federation

U19 World Cup
- Appearances: 6
- Medals: None

U18 Asia Cup
- Appearances: 22
- Medals: Gold: 3 (2004, 2008, 2016); Silver: 2 (2002, 2014); Bronze: 1 (2012)
Home	Away
Medal record
U18 Asia Cup
Gold medal – first place	2004 Bangalore
Gold medal – first place	2008 Tehran
Gold medal – first place	2016 Tehran
Silver medal – second place	2002 Kuwait City
Silver medal – second place	2014 Doha
Bronze medal – third place	2012 Ulan Bator

The Iran men's national under-18 and under-19 basketball team is a national basketball team of Iran, administered by the Islamic Republic of Iran Basketball Federation. It represents the country in international under-18 and under-19 men's basketball competitions.

The team's home venue is Azadi Basketball Hall.

== Results ==
=== FIBA U18 Asia Cup ===
Year	Result
1970	DNP
1972	DNP
1974	6th
1977	8th
1978	12th
1980	DNP
1982	13th
1984	DNP
1986	DNP
1989	8th
1990	10th
1992	9th
1995	DNP
1996	10th

Year	Result
1998	5th
2000	9th
2002	2nd place, silver medalist(s)
2004	1st place, gold medalist(s)
2006	7th
2008	1st place, gold medalist(s)
2010	4th
2012	3rd place, bronze medalist(s)
2014	2nd place, silver medalist(s)
2016	1st place, gold medalist(s)
2018	6th
2022	5th
2024	6th
2026	6th

=== FIBA Under-19 Basketball World Cup ===
Year	Pos.	Pld	W	L
(Brazil) 1979	Did not qualify			
(Spain) 1983	Did not qualify			
(Italy) 1987	Did not qualify			
(Canada) 1991	Did not qualify			
(Greece) 1995	Did not qualify			
(Portugal) 1999	Did not qualify			
(Greece) 2003	16th	8	1	7
(Serbia) 2007	Did not qualify			
(New Zealand) 2009	15th	5	1	4
(Latvia) 2011	Did not qualify			
(Czech Republic) 2013	11th	8	2	6
(Greece) 2015	14th	7	1	6
(Egypt) 2017	15th	7	1	6
(Greece) 2019	Did not qualify			
(Latvia) 2021	12th	7	2	5
(Hungary) 2023	Did not qualify			
(Switzerland) 2025	Did not qualify			
(Czech Republic) 2027	Did not qualify			
(Indonesia) 2029	To be determined			
Total	6/19	42	8	34

== Roster ==
Iran roster at 2008 FIBA Asia Under-18 Championship:

Iran men's national under-18 basketball team roster
Players
Coaches

Pos.	No.	Name	Age – Date of birth	Height	Club
PG	4	Mohammad Reza Falahat	16 – September 10, 1991	5 ft 11 in (1.8 m)	Zob Ahan
SG	5	Emad Salmani	18 – August 2, 1990	6 ft 2 in (1.88 m)	Zob Ahan
PG	6	Ramin Honarmand	18 – March 22, 1990	5 ft 9 in (1.75 m)	Zob Ahan
G/F	7	Mehdi Shirjang	18 – May 31, 1990	6 ft 2 in (1.88 m)	Louleh a.s
SF	8	Pouria Kazemi	18 – January 30, 1990	6 ft 3 in (1.91 m)	Malavan
SF	9	Mohammad Jamshidi	17 – July 30, 1991	6 ft 5 in (1.96 m)	HB Shahrekord
SG	10	Mohammad Amjad (C)	18 – March 17, 1990	6 ft 1 in (1.85 m)	Zob Ahan
PF	11	Ramtin Zare Shirazi	17 – January 3, 1991	6 ft 7 in (2.01 m)	Zob Ahan
PF	12	Mohammad Hassanzadeh	17 – October 6, 1990	6 ft 7 in (2.01 m)	Saba Mehr
C	13	Soren Derboghosian	18 – February 20, 1990	6 ft 9 in (2.06 m)	Ararat
PF	14	Davoud Sabouni	18 – January 28, 1990	6 ft 7 in (2.01 m)	Zob Ahan
C	15	Farbod Farman	17 – March 10, 1991	6 ft 10 in (2.08 m)	Mahram

Head coach

- Nebojša Raičević

Assistant coach(es)

- Mohammad Reza Nouri
- Alireza Esna-Ashari

Legend

- (C) Team captain
- nat field describes country
  of last club
  before the tournament
- Age field is age on September 5, 2008

== Head coaches ==
- (Serbia) Nebojša Raičević (2008-2009)
- (Iran) Mohsen Sadeghzadeh (2010)
- (Iran) Ali Towfigh (2011)
- (Iran) Mehran Hatami (2012)
- (Iran) Mohamad-Reza Eslami (2013)
- (Serbia) Miloš Pejić (2013–2014)

== See also ==
- Iran men's national basketball team
- Iran men's national under-16 basketball team
- Iran women's national under-18 basketball team
