= Iraq men's national under-18 basketball team =

Iraq
- FIBA zone: FIBA Asia
- National federation: Iraqi Basketball Association

U19 World Cup
- Appearances: None

U18 Asia Cup
- Appearances: 5
- Medals: (bronze) Bronze: 1 (1978)

The Iraq men's national under-18 basketball team is a national basketball team of Iraq, administered by the Iraqi Basketball Association. It represents the country in international under-18 men's basketball competitions.

== FIBA Under-18 Asia Cup participations ==
Year	Result
1978	3rd place, bronze medalist(s)
1989	7th
2010	10th
2014	13th
2016	9th

== See also ==
- Iraq men's national basketball team
- Iraq men's national under-16 basketball team
