= Patrick Nikolas =

Indonesian professional basketball player

No. 8 – Bogor Hornbills
- Position: Power forward / small forward
- League: IBL

Personal information
- Born: 2 September 1998 (age 28) Jakarta, Indonesia
- Listed height: 188 cm (6 ft 2 in)
- Listed weight: 85 kg (187 lb)

Career information
- High school: Marsudirini (Bogor, Indonesia)
- College: UPH
- Playing career: 2021–present

Career history
- 2021-2023: West Bandits Solo
- 2023-2026: Dewa United Banten
- 2026-present: Bogor Hornbills

Career highlights
- IBL champion (2025); 2× IBL All-Star (2022, 2026)
Medals
Men's basketball
Representing Indonesia
Southeast Asian Games
| Bronze medal – third place | 2025 Thailand | Team |

Patrick Nikolas (born September, 2 1998) is an Indonesian professional basketball player for Bogor Hornbills of the Indonesian Basketball League (IBL). He can also play the guard position. He played college basketball for the UPH Eagles.

== Professional career ==
Nikolas spent three seasons—from 2021 to 2023—with the West Bandits Solo. In the 2021 season, he played in 21 games, averaging 7.6 points per game and 6.5 rebounds per game over 21 games; in the 2022 season, he averaged 6.3 points per game, 6 rebounds per game, and 1.1 assists per game over 27 games; and in the 2023 season, he averaged 4.1 points per game and 4.6 rebounds per game over 22 games.

== National team career ==
In his youth years, Nikolas represented the Indonesia men's national under-18 basketball team in the 2016 FIBA Asia Under-18 Championship that was held in Islamic Republic of Iran. He averaged 2.8 points per game, playing in five matches played.

In 2025, Patrick was called up by the senior national team for the 2025 SEA Games in Bangkok, Thailand.
