= Mason Amos =

Filipino-Australian basketball player

No. 21 – De La Salle Green Archers
- Position: Power forward / center
- League: UAAP

Personal information
- Born: August 21, 2004 (age 22) Queensland, Australia
- Listed height: 6 ft 7 in (2.01 m)

Career information
- High school: Brisbane State High
- College: Ateneo; De La Salle

Career highlights
- UAAP champion (2025)
Medals
Men's basketball
Representing Philippines
SEA Games
Gold medal – first place	2023 Phnom Penh	Team

Mason Francis Dulieu Amos (born August 21, 2004) is a Filipino-Australian college basketball player for the De La Salle Green Archers of the University Athletic Association of the Philippines (UAAP). He previously played for the Ateneo Blue Eagles.

Internationally, he represents the Philippines, having played for the senior national team and under-18 team.

== College career ==
On April 25, 2022, Amos committed to Ateneo de Manila University (ADMU) Blue Eagles in the Philippines, coming off a high school career at Brisbane State High School in Brisbane, Queensland, Australia. He chose Ateneo stating that it was where he could have the most development potential while also focusing on academics.

On July 1, 2024, after only one season with Ateneo, Amos made a shock move to De La Salle University (DLSU) Green Archers, switching sides in the Ateneo–La Salle rivalry. The move saw mixed reactions within the Philippine college basketball community, particularly within Ateneo, with Amos later posting an apology for the lack of consideration in his decision. Amos would be eligible to play for De La Salle starting from UAAP Season 88 in 2025. On October 12, 2025, in a game against the National University (NU) Bulldogs, Amos collided with NU forward Gelo Santiago during the fourth quarter. The following day, a diagnosis revealed that he had suffered a medial collateral ligament (MCL) injury and was expected to miss the rest of the elimination round.

== National team career ==
Amos represents the Philippines in international competitions. In 2022, he played for the national under-18 team during the 2022 FIBA U18 Asian Championship, where he became a key player. On February 23, 2023, he was called up to the senior national team for the first time for the sixth window of Asian qualifiers for the 2023 FIBA Basketball World Cup. The day after, as the youngest player in the roster, he scored 13 points in his national team debut against Lebanon.
