= Hamad Mousa =

Qatari basketball player (born 2006)

No. 10 – Cal Poly Mustangs
- Position: Shooting guard / small forward
- Conference: Big West Conference

Personal information
- Born: March 28, 2006 (age 20)
- Listed height: 6 ft 8 in (2.03 m)
- Listed weight: 200 lb (91 kg)

Career information
- High school: NBA Global Academy
- College: Dayton (2024–2025); Cal Poly (2025–present)
- Playing career: 2023–2024

Career history
- 2023–2024: Al-Rayyan
Medals
Men's 3x3 basketball
Representing Qatar
Asian Games
Silver medal – second place	2022 Hangzhou	Team

Hamad Yassin Mousa (Arabic: حمد ياسين موسى; born March 28, 2006) is a Qatari college basketball player for the Cal Poly Mustangs of the Big West Conference. He previously played for the Dayton Flyers.

== Early life ==
Mousa is the son of former basketball player Yaseen Musa. He attended the NBA Global Academy in Canberra, Australia. He participated in the Basketball Without Borders event and Nike Hoop Summit in 2024. Also in 2024, Mousa played for the Qatar men’s national team in the Asia Cup qualifying games, averaging 9.0 points, 2.5 rebounds, and 1.5 steals per game. In May 2024, he announced his decision to play college basketball at the University of Dayton, becoming the second player from Qatar to play Division I men's basketball.

== College career ==
=== Dayton ===
As a true freshman, Mousa played sparingly, averaging 1.3 points per game.

=== Cal Poly ===
Following his freshman season, Mousa transferred to California Polytechnic State University, San Luis Obispo, to play for the Cal Poly Mustangs. In his sophomore campaign, Mousa emerged as the Mustangs' leading scorer and rebounder. Against Cal State Northridge, he scored a career-high 34 points in a loss. After the season, Mousa announced that he would once again enter the NCAA transfer portal. He decided to return to Cal Poly for his junior season, declining more lucrative offers of at least $1.5 million per year from other schools.

== Career statistics ==
Legend
GP	Games played	GS	Games started	MPG	Minutes per game
FG%	Field goal percentage	3P%	3-point field goal percentage	FT%	Free throw percentage
RPG	Rebounds per game	APG	Assists per game	SPG	Steals per game
BPG	Blocks per game	PPG	Points per game	**Bold**	Career high

=== College ===
Year	Team	GP	GS	MPG	FG%	3P%	FT%	RPG	APG	SPG	BPG	PPG
2024–25	Dayton	20	0	7.8	.304	.077	.688	.5	.4	.2	.0	1.3
2025–26	Cal Poly	**32**	**30**	**31.3**	**.443**	**.372**	**.878**	**6.3**	**2.0**	**1.0**	**.4**	**20.4**
Career		52	30	22.3	.436	.356	.864	4.0	1.4	.7	.2	13.0
