= Koji Buenaflor =

Filipino basketball player (born 2005)

No. 19 – UST Growling Tigers
- League: UAAP

Personal information
- Born: November 19, 2005 (age 20)

Career information
- High school: UST
- College: UST (2025–present)

Koji Ivan Buenaflor is a Filipino basketball player who plays for the UST Growling Tigers in the University Athletic Association of the Philippines.

== Early life and education ==
Koji Ivan Buenaflor was born on November 19, 2005. He studied at the University of Santo Tomas (UST) for high school and is pursuing a college degree in the same institution. Before being recruited by UST's sports program, Buenaflor attended a public school.

== Career ==
=== High school ===
Koji Buenaflor played for the UST Tiger Cubs high school basketball team under head coach Manu Iñigo in the University Athletic Association of the Philippines (UAAP). He helped the Cubs win the junior title in UAAP Season 87 in March 2025.

=== College ===
Despite receiving offers from various universities, Buenaflor committed to UST. He made his senior UAAP debut with the UST Growling Tigers in Season 88 in the latter half of 2025.

=== National 3x3 team ===
In July 2026, Buenaflor was part of the Philippine under-21 team that played in the FIBA 3x3 Nations League which helped qualify the country a berth at the 2026 FIBA 3x3 U23 World Cup.

Buenaflor was part of the Philippine national 3x3 team which competed at the 2026 Asian Games in Aichi and Nagoya, Japan alongside Nic Cabañero, Doy Dungo, and Luis Pablo.

== Personal life ==
Buenaflor is from San Jose del Monte, Bulacan.
