= Collège Élite (Beirut) =

Information
- Other name: Lycée français international Elite - Beyrouth
- School type: International school
- Established: 1982; 44 years ago
- Grades: toute petite section - terminale
- Language: French

Collège Élite or Lycée français international Elite-Beyrouth is a French international school in Lebanon that is a part of the Association Franco-Libanaise pour l'Education et la Culture (AFLEC) network. Its main campus is in Beirut, and it has a branch campus in Bchamoun,

It serves levels toute petite section (less than three years) through terminale, the final year of lycée (senior high school/sixth form college). At the Bchamoun campus students may study until seconde (first year of lycée), while students must go to the main campus in Beirut for première (second year of lycée) and terminale (third year) levels.

The school was first established in 1982, and the Bchamoun campus was established in 1998. As of 2016, of the students in the main campus, 85% were Lebanese, 11% were French, and 4% were of other nationalities. At the Bchamoun campus 95% of the students were Lebanese, 1% were French, and 4% were of other nationalities.
