= 2013 FIBA Under-19 World Championship =

Tournament details
- Host country: Czech Republic
- City: Prague
- Dates: 27 June – 7 July
- Teams: 16 (from 5 confederations)
- Venues: 2 (in 1 host city)

Final positions
- Champions: United States (5th title)

Tournament statistics
- MVP: (United States) Aaron Gordon
- Top scorer: (Canada) Tyler Ennis (20.9)
- Top rebounds: (Czech Republic) Peterka (11.5)
- Top assists: (Czech Republic) Kouřil (5.7)
- PPG (Team): United States (95.9)
- RPG (Team): United States (48.8)
- APG (Team): Croatia (17.7)

Official website
- web.archive.org

The 2013 FIBA Under-19 World Championship (Czech: Mistrovství světa FIBA do 19 let 2013) was the 11th edition of the FIBA U19 World Championship, the biennial international men's youth basketball championship contested by the U19 national teams of the member associations of FIBA. It was hosted by the Czech Republic from 27 June to 7 July 2013.

The United States won their fifth title by defeating Serbia 82–68 in the final.

== Format ==
Teams played a round robin in the preliminary round, with the top three teams advancing to the main round. The teams played against the teams from the other groups. The top four teams advanced to the knockout stage.

== Qualified teams ==
Means of qualification	Date	Venue	Berths	Qualified
Host nation	3 May 2012		1	Czech Republic
2012 FIBA Europe Under-18 Championship	9–19 August 2012	Lithuania	5	Croatia; Lithuania; Russia; Serbia; Spain
2012 FIBA Americas Under-18 Championship	16–20 June 2012	Brazil	4	Argentina; Brazil; Canada; United States
2012 FIBA Asia Under-18 Championship	17–26 August 2012	Mongolia	3	China; Iran; South Korea
2012 FIBA Africa Under-18 Championship	16–25 August 2012	Mozambique	2	Ivory Coast; Senegal
2012 FIBA Oceania Under-18 Championship	20–22 September 2012	New Zealand	1	Australia
Total			16	

== Preliminary round ==
The draw for the tournament was held on 15 January 2013 in Prague, Czech Republic.

=== Group A ===
Team	Pld	W	L	PF	PA	PD	Pts
Spain	3	3	0	271	216	+55	6
Croatia	3	2	1	261	241	+20	5
Canada	3	1	2	229	235	−6	4
South Korea	3	0	3	234	303	−69	3

27 June 2013
13:15

Boxscore

Spain	81–70	Canada
Scoring by quarter: 23–19, 16–14, 15–21, 27–16
Pts: Pérez 23; Rebs: Saiz 7 Asts: Brizuela 5		Pts: Ennis 20; Rebs: Notice, Lyles 7 Asts: Ennis 3

Podvinny Mlyn Arena, Prague
Referees: Panagiotis Anastopoulos (GRE), Guilherme Locatelli (BRA), David Joao Domingos Manuel (ANG)

27 June 2013
15:30

Boxscore

Croatia	106–89	South Korea
Scoring by quarter: 20–25, 26–22, 33–18, 27–24
Pts: Šarić 32; Rebs: Šarić 12; Asts: Šarić 12		Pts: Kang Sang-jae 35; Rebs: Cheon Gi-beom 6 Asts: Cheon Gi-beom, Heo Hoon 5

O2 Arena Prague, Prague
Referees: Roberto Chiari (ITA), Rüştü Nuran (TUR), Roberto Vazquez (PUR)

28 June 2013
13:15

Boxscore

Canada	66–79	Croatia
Scoring by quarter: 19–22, 13–15, 12–15, 22–27
Pts: Ennis 25; Rebs: Lyles 10; Asts: Ennis 4		Pts: Mustapić 21; Rebs: Šarić 15; Asts: Šarić 7

O2 Arena Prague, Prague
Referees: Robert Vyklický (CZE), Alejandro Sánchez Varela (URU), Alexey Davydov (RUS)

28 June 2013
15:30

Boxscore

South Korea	70–104	Spain
Scoring by quarter: 21–20, 14–29, 14–25, 21–30
Pts: Park In-tae 13; Rebs: Cheon Gi-beom 6 Asts: Cheon Gi-beom 6		Pts: Brizuela 20; Rebs: Saiz 15; Asts: Pérez 4

Podvinny Mlyn Arena, Prague
Referees: Milija Vojinović (SRB), Ricor Buaron (PHI), Naohiko Uchihara (JPN)

29 June 2013
13:15

Boxscore

Croatia	76–86	Spain
Scoring by quarter: 15–25, 25–14, 17–25, 19–22
Pts: Šarić 23; Rebs: Šarić 14; Asts: Mustapić 5		Pts: Brizuela 14; Rebs: Saiz 8 Asts: Brizuela 5

Podvinny Mlyn Arena, Prague
Referees: Steven Marquis Anderson (USA), Christopher Antony Reid (AUS), Alexey Davydov (RUS)

29 June 2013
15:30

Boxscore

Canada	93–75	South Korea
Scoring by quarter: 27–23, 18–18, 20–20, 28–14
Pts: Ennis 26; Rebs: Notice, Lyles 11; Asts: Ennis 4		Pts: Choi Jun-yong 14; Rebs: Heo Hoon 7 Asts: Cheon Gi-beom 6

O2 Arena Prague, Prague
Referees: Grzegorz Ziemblicki (POL), Borys Shulga (UKR), Benjamin Jiménez Trujillo (ESP)

=== Group B ===
Team	Pld	W	L	PF	PA	PD	Pts
Lithuania	3	3	0	234	180	+54	6
Argentina	3	1	2	215	215	0	4
Iran	3	1	2	174	214	−40	4
Czech Republic	3	1	2	189	203	−14	4

27 June 2013
18:00

Boxscore

Czech Republic	74–77	Lithuania
Scoring by quarter: 23–25, 19–17, 21–19, 11–16
Pts: Peterka 21; Rebs: Křivánek 9 Asts: Kouřil 7		Pts: Grigonis 16; Rebs: Krestinin 10; Asts: Krestinin 4

O2 Arena Prague, Prague
Referees: Steven Marquis Anderson (USA), Ricor Buaron (PHI), Sašo Petek (SLO)

27 June 2013
20:15

Boxscore

Iran	84–73	Argentina
Scoring by quarter: 22–13, 18–21, 29–10, 15–29
Pts: Mashayekhi 32; Rebs: Yousofvand 12; Asts: Dalirzahan 3		Pts: Bernardini 16; Rebs: Whelan 7 Asts: Whelan 7

Podvinny Mlyn Arena, Prague
Referees: Borys Shulga (UKR), Grzegorz Ziemblicki (POL), Naftal Candido Chongo (MOZ)

28 June 2013
18:00

Boxscore

Argentina	76–55	Czech Republic
Scoring by quarter: 17–17, 22–6, 22–15, 15–17
Pts: Haag 13; Rebs: Deck 8 Asts: Whelan 5		Pts: Šafarčík 10; Rebs: Šoula, Šafarčík 6 Asts: Kouřil 5

O2 Arena Prague, Prague
Referees: Christopher Antony Reid (AUS), Perry Stothart (CAN), Benjamin Jiménez Trujillo (ESP)

28 June 2013
20:15

Boxscore

Lithuania	81–40	Iran
Scoring by quarter: 23–10, 20–6, 21–9, 17–15
Pts: Lekavicius 13; Rebs: Grigonis 8 Asts: Gintvainis 6		Pts: Mashayekhi, Dalirzahan 7 Rebs: Mashayekhi 9 Asts: Dalirzahan 2

Podvinny Mlyn Arena, Prague
Referees: Roberto Vazquez (PUR), Panagiotis Anastopoulos (GRE), David Joao Domingos Manuel (ANG)

29 June 2013
18:00

Boxscore

Iran	50–60	Czech Republic
Scoring by quarter: 9–20, 12–12, 8–10, 21–18
Pts: Foroutan 13; Rebs: Mashayekhi 13; Asts: Mashayekhi 2		Pts: Peterka 19; Rebs: Peterka 15; Asts: Kouřil, Feštr 4

O2 Arena Prague, Prague
Referees: Roberto Chiari (ITA), Naohiko Uchihara (JPN), Guilherme Locatelli (BRA)

29 June 2013
20:15

Boxscore

Lithuania	76–66	Argentina
Scoring by quarter: 19–15, 20–17, 17–14, 20–20
Pts: Dimša, Tarolis 12; Rebs: Geben 10; Asts: Lekavicius 3		Pts: Bernardini 15; Rebs: Torres 10; Asts: Whelan 4

Podvinny Mlyn Arena, Prague
Referees: Nicolas Maestre (FRA), Milija Vojinović (SRB), Roberto Oliveros (VEN)

=== Group C ===
Team	Pld	W	L	PF	PA	PD	Pts
Serbia	3	3	0	223	156	+67	6
Australia	3	2	1	220	169	+51	5
Brazil	3	1	2	167	194	−27	4
Senegal	3	0	3	151	242	−91	3

27 June 2013
13:15

Boxscore

Senegal	46–90	Australia
Scoring by quarter: 11–26, 16–22, 8–23, 11–19
Pts: Diatta 24; Rebs: Ndiaye 10; Asts: four players 1		Pts: Kalau von Hofe 16; Rebs: Oswald 11; Asts: Exum 6

O2 Arena Prague, Prague
Referees: Roberto Oliveros (VEN), Alexey Davydov (RUS), Nan Ye (CHN)

27 June 2013
15:30

Boxscore

Serbia	65–50	Brazil
Scoring by quarter: 14–7, 18–10, 15–13, 18–20
Pts: Milutinov 15; Rebs: Pot 13; Asts: Pot 5		Pts: Dias Silva 19; Rebs: Campos Sommer, Dias Silva 6 Asts: Fernandes da Silva 2

Podvinny Mlyn Arena, Prague
Referees: Perry Stothart (CAN), Nicolas Maestre (FRA), Naohiko Uchihara (JPN)

28 June 2013
13:15

Boxscore

Brazil	72–56	Senegal
Scoring by quarter: 15–12, 9–17, 26–3, 22–24
Pts: Bordignon Barbieri 14; Rebs: Fernandes da Silva 5 Asts: Ferreira Junior 4		Pts: Ndoye 13; Rebs: Ndoye 10; Asts: Diatta, Sankare 2

Podvinny Mlyn Arena, Prague
Referees: Rüştü Nuran (TUR), Marvan Egho (LIB), Leandro Nicolas Lezcano (ARG)

28 June 2013
15:30

Boxscore

Australia	57–78	Serbia
Scoring by quarter: 18–18, 10–26, 18–20, 11–14
Pts: Pineau 21; Rebs: Duncan 6 Asts: Naar 3		Pts: Milutinov 16; Rebs: N. Janković 14; Asts: Micić 4

O2 Arena Prague, Prague
Referees: Roberto Chiari (ITA), Steven Marquis Anderson (USA), Borys Shulga (UKR)

29 June 2013
13:15

Boxscore

Brazil	45–73	Australia
Scoring by quarter: 9–21, 7–14, 16–20, 13–18
Pts: Fuzaro Siqueira, Dias 8 Rebs: Fernandes da Silva 10; Asts: Fernandes da Silva 4		Pts: Duncan 18; Rebs: Pineau 12; Asts: Exum, Martin 5

O2 Arena Prague, Prague
Referees: Panagiotis Anastopoulos (GRE), Robert Vyklický (CZE), Sašo Petek (SLO)

29 June 2013
15:30

Boxscore

Senegal	49–80	Serbia
Scoring by quarter: 15–21, 11–13, 9–14, 14–22
Pts: Ndoye 11; Rebs: Ndoye 10; Asts: four players 1		Pts: Andrić 13; Rebs: Jokić 11; Asts: Anđušić 4

Podvinny Mlyn Arena, Prague
Referees: Roberto Vazquez (PUR), Naftal Candido Chongo (MOZ), Alejandro Sánchez Varela (URU)

=== Group D ===
Team	Pld	W	L	PF	PA	PD	Pts
United States	3	3	0	316	133	+183	6
China	3	2	1	199	220	−21	5
Russia	3	1	2	184	219	−35	4
Ivory Coast	3	0	3	120	247	−127	3

27 June 2013
18:00

Boxscore

China	61–59	Russia
Scoring by quarter: 19–15, 14–12, 16–19, 12–13
Pts: Zhou Qi 28; Rebs: Zhou Qi 17; Asts: Wu Qian 4		Pts: Karenin 14; Rebs: Kulagin 7 Asts: Annaev 6

Podvinny Mlyn Arena, Prague
Referees: Robert Vyklický (CZE), Alejandro Sánchez Varela (URU), Benjamin Jiménez Trujillo (ESP)

27 June 2013
20:15

Boxscore

Ivory Coast	29–88	United States
Scoring by quarter: 10–34, 7–22, 5–19, 7–13
Pts: D. Traore 9 Rebs: Adjei, D. Traore 5 Asts: A. Toure 1		Pts: Winslow 14; Rebs: Payton, Winslow 7 Asts: Gordon 4

O2 Arena Prague, Prague
Referees: Milija Vojinović (SRB), Christopher Antony Reid (AUS), Leandro Nicolas Lezcano (ARG)

28 June 2013
18:00

Boxscore

Russia	78–43	Ivory Coast
Scoring by quarter: 24–13, 24–15, 16–9, 14–6
Pts: Kulagin 12; Rebs: Gankevich 9 Asts: Annaev 7		Pts: Kouakou 15; Rebs: D. Traore 9 Asts: A. Toure, D. Traore 1

Podvinny Mlyn Arena, Prague
Referees: Grzegorz Ziemblicki (POL), Sašo Petek (SLO), Naftal Candido Chongo (MOZ)

28 June 2013
20:15

Boxscore

United States	113–57	China
Scoring by quarter: 29–17, 34–12, 23–10, 27–18
Pts: Gordon 17; Rebs: Gordon 11; Asts: Winslow 5		Pts: Yuan Shuai 18; Rebs: Wu Qian, Zhou Qi 4 Asts: Zhao Jiwei 2

O2 Arena Prague, Prague
Referees: Nicolas Maestre (FRA), Roberto Oliveros (VEN), Guilherme Locatelli (BRA)

29 June 2013
18:00

Boxscore

China	81–48	Ivory Coast
Scoring by quarter: 20–7, 27–16, 25–9, 9–16
Pts: Gao Shang 23; Rebs: Zhao Jiwei 9 Asts: Zhao Jiwei 7		Pts: A. Toure 13; Rebs: D. Traore 17; Asts: A. Toure 2

Podvinny Mlyn Arena, Prague
Referees: Perry Stothart (CAN), Ricor Buaron (PHI), Leandro Nicolas Lezcano (ARG)

29 June 2013
20:15

Boxscore

United States	115–47	Russia
Scoring by quarter: 30–13, 27–17, 30–11, 28–6
Pts: Okafor 15; Rebs: Tobey 9 Asts: three players 3		Pts: Kulagin 19; Rebs: Gankevich, Ilnitskiy 5 Asts: Annaev 4

O2 Arena Prague, Prague
Referees: Rüştü Nuran (TUR), Marwan Egho (LIB), David Joao Domingos Manuel (ANG)

== Eighth final round ==
=== Group E ===
Team	Pld	W	L	PF	PA	PD	Pts
Spain	6	5	1	472	394	+78	11
Lithuania	6	5	1	467	406	+61	11
Croatia	6	5	1	518	454	+64	11
Canada	6	3	3	478	436	+42	9
Iran	6	1	5	350	458	−108	7
Argentina	6	1	5	398	452	−54	7

1 July 2013
13:15

Boxscore

Argentina	63–85	Croatia
Scoring by quarter: 10–21, 9–28, 19–17, 25–19
Pts: Vaulet 13; Rebs: Vaulet 7 Asts: Barral 5		Pts: Šarić 19; Rebs: Šarić 18; Asts: Mavra 7

O2 Arena Prague, Prague
Referees: Panagiotis Anastopoulos (GRE), Borys Shulga (UKR), Roberto Vazquez (PUR)

1 July 2013
20:15

Boxscore

Iran	59–68	Spain
Scoring by quarter: 18–15, 7–23, 13–16, 21–14
Pts: Yousofvand 17; Rebs: Mashayekhi 7 Asts: Beigi 4		Pts: Vicedo 21; Rebs: Vicedo 11; Asts: Pérez 6

Podvinny Mlyn Arena, Prague
Referees: Roberto Chiari (ITA), Marwan Egho (LIB), Sašo Petek (SLO)

1 July 2013
20:15

Boxscore

Lithuania	82–76	Canada
Scoring by quarter: 8–21, 21–18, 20–8, 33–29
Pts: Dimša 22; Rebs: Grigonis 9 Asts: Lekavicius 5		Pts: Ennis 28; Rebs: Lyles 10; Asts: Notice 3

O2 Arena Prague, Prague
Referees: Rüstü Nuran (TUR), Christopher Antony Reid (AUS), Steven Marquis Anderson (USA)

2 July 2013
15:30

Boxscore

Canada	95–57	Iran
Scoring by quarter: 31–20, 11–15, 24–15, 27–7
Pts: Lyles 18; Rebs: Keane 7 Asts: Keane 8		Pts: Foroutan, Mashayekhi 13; Rebs: Dalirzahan 6 Asts: Yakhchali 6

Podvinny Mlyn Arena, Prague
Referees: Nicolas Maestre (FRA), Milija Vojinović (SRB), Alexey Davydov (RUS)

2 July 2013
15:30

Boxscore

Spain	74–58	Argentina
Scoring by quarter: 12–16, 18–17, 26–12, 18–13
Pts: Brizuela 17; Rebs: Vicedo 8 Asts: Pérez 4		Pts: Bernardini 18; Rebs: Torres 6 Asts: Barral 4

O2 Arena Prague, Prague
Referees: Rüstü Nuran (TUR), Alejandro Sánchez Varela (URU), Robert Vyklický (CZE)

2 July 2013
20:15

Boxscore

Croatia	91–90	Lithuania
Scoring by quarter: 25–20, 34–19, 17–21, 15–30
Pts: Junaković 27; Rebs: Šarić 12; Asts: Šarić, Brzoja 5		Pts: Grigonis 31; Rebs: Dimša, Grigonis 7 Asts: Grigonis 6

Podvinny Mlyn Arena, Prague
Referees: Grzegorz Ziemblicki (POL), Benjamin Jiménez Trujillo (ESP), Guilherme Locatelli (BRA)

3 July 2013
13:15

Boxscore

Argentina	62–78	Canada
Scoring by quarter: 11–17, 12–25, 23–23, 16–13
Pts: Torres 16; Rebs: Saiz 7 Asts: Gonzales 3		Pts: Lyles 21; Rebs: Lyles 12; Asts: Rathan-Mayes, Ennis 2

O2 Arena Prague, Prague
Referees: Christopher Antony Reid (AUS), Alexey Davydov (RUS), Sašo Petek (SLO)

3 July 2013
15:30

Boxscore

Iran	60–81	Croatia
Scoring by quarter: 12–24, 18–21, 16–17, 14–19
Pts: Foroutan 17; Rebs: Foroutan, Rahmati 7 Asts: Foroutan 2		Pts: Šarić 27; Rebs: Šarić 9 Asts: Šarić, Bošnjak 4

Podvinny Mlyn Arena, Prague
Referees: Benjamin Jiménez Trujillo (ESP), Roberto Oliveros (VEN), Naftal Candido Chongo (MOZ)

3 July 2013
15:30

Boxscore

Lithuania	61–59	Spain
Scoring by quarter: 17–11, 19–15, 11–17, 14–16
Pts: Grigonis 13; Rebs: Krestinin 8 Asts: Dimša 4		Pts: Hernangómez 13; Rebs: Saiz 9 Asts: Nogués, Marin 2

O2 Arena Prague, Prague
Referees: Perry Stothart (CAN), Roberto Vazquez (PUR), Leandro Nicolas Lezcano (ARG)

=== Group F ===
Team	Pld	W	L	PF	PA	PD	Pts
United States	6	6	0	572	312	+260	12
Serbia	6	5	1	421	323	+98	11
China	6	3	3	414	462	−48	9
Australia	6	3	3	428	412	+16	9
Russia	6	2	4	373	435	−62	8
Brazil	6	2	4	398	444	−46	8

1 July 2013
15:30

Boxscore

China	88–79	Australia
Scoring by quarter: 8–18, 25–19, 28–19, 27–23
Pts: Yuan Shuai 27; Rebs: Zhou Qi 17; Asts: Zhao Jiwei 6		Pts: Naar, Exum 20; Rebs: Pineau 15; Asts: Martin 5

Podvinny Mlyn Arena, Prague
Referees: Grzegorz Ziemblicki (POL), Milija Vojinović (SRB), Naftal Candido Chongo (MOZ)

1 July 2013
15:30

Boxscore

Russia	46–60	Serbia
Scoring by quarter: 10–21, 12–14, 13–15, 11–10
Pts: Ilnitskiy 17; Rebs: Kulagin 8 Asts: four players 2		Pts: Milutinov 14; Rebs: Milutinov 8 Asts: Pot, Micić 4

O2 Arena Prague, Prague
Referees: Perry Stothart (CAN), Guilherme Locatelli (BRA), Leandro Nicolas Lezcano (ARG)

1 July 2013
18:00

Boxscore

United States	91–66	Brazil
Scoring by quarter: 20–17, 20–17, 29–14, 22–18
Pts: Sulaimon 15; Rebs: Smart, Gordon 10; Asts: Smart 4		Pts: Demetrio 15; Rebs: Bordignon Barbieri 7 Asts: three players 2

Podvinny Mlyn Arena, Prague
Referees: Benjamin Jiménez Trujillo (ESP), Alejandro Sánchez Varela (URU), Ricor Buaron (PHI)

2 July 2013
13:15

Boxscore

Brazil	78–81 (OT)	Russia
Scoring by quarter: 18–20, 20–22, 25–21, 12–12, Overtime: 3–6
Pts: Bordignon Barbieri, Demetrio 18; Rebs: Bordignon Barbieri 11; Asts: Fuzaro Siqueira, Ramos 3		Pts: Ilnitskiy 29; Rebs: Kulagin 9 Asts: Annaev 6

O2 Arena Prague, Prague
Referees: Roberto Chiari (ITA), Roberto Vazquez (PUR), David Joao Domingos Manuel (ANG)

2 July 2013
18:00

Boxscore

Serbia	76–50	China
Scoring by quarter: 21–10, 12–14, 17–16, 26–10
Pts: N. Janković 15; Rebs: Milutinov 13; Asts: Micić 3		Pts: Wu Quanxi 10; Rebs: Gao Shang 7 Asts: Zhao Jiwei 3

Podvinny Mlyn Arena, Prague
Referees: Panagiotis Anastopoulos (GRE), Roberto Oliveros (VEN), Marwan Egho (LIB)

2 July 2013
20:15

Boxscore

Australia	51–94	United States
Scoring by quarter: 12–24, 8–31, 16–22, 15–17
Pts: Kalau von Hofe 17; Rebs: Pineau 8 Asts: Naar, Martin 2		Pts: Gordon 15; Rebs: Winslow 10; Asts: Smart 4

O2 Arena Prague, Prague
Referees: Perry Stothart (CAN), Naohiko Uchihara (JPN), Leandro Nicolas Lezcano (ARG)

3 July 2013
18:00

Boxscore

China	77–87	Brazil
Scoring by quarter: 15–27, 29–15, 13–17, 20–28
Pts: Gao Shang 30; Rebs: Wu Quanxi 6 Asts: Gao Shang 3		Pts: Ramos 17; Rebs: Ramos 10; Asts: Martins Verardo, Ramos 4

Podvinny Mlyn Arena, Prague
Referees: Rüstü Nuran (TUR), Steven Marquis Anderson (USA), Borys Shulga (UKR)

3 July 2013
20:15

Boxscore

Russia	61–78	Australia
Scoring by quarter: 14–12, 13–21, 21–22, 13–23
Pts: Kanygin 17; Rebs: Kulagin 10; Asts: Annaev 3		Pts: Exum 20; Rebs: Pineau 6 Asts: Exum 6

Podvinny Mlyn Arena, Prague
Referees: Nicolas Maestre (FRA), Ricor Buaron (PHI), Guilherme Locatelli (BRA)

3 July 2013
20:15

Boxscore

United States	71–62	Serbia
Scoring by quarter: 19–15, 16–11, 15–21, 21–15
Pts: Okafor 16; Rebs: Gordon 9 Asts: Robinson 3		Pts: Micić 24; Rebs: Jokić 7 Asts: Jokić, Micić 3

O2 Arena Prague, Prague
Referees: Roberto Chiari (ITA), Robert Vyklický (CZE), Alejandro Sánchez Varela (URU)

== Classification round ==
=== 13th–16th place ===
Team	Pld	W	L	PF	PA	PD	Pts
South Korea	3	2	1	248	250	−2	5
Czech Republic	3	2	1	244	233	+11	5
Ivory Coast	3	1	2	179	193	−14	4
Senegal	3	1	2	217	212	+5	4

1 July 2013
13:15

Boxscore

Senegal	51–53	Ivory Coast
Scoring by quarter: 14–14, 6–13, 20–17, 11–9
Pts: Diatta 13; Rebs: Ndoye 8 Asts: three players 2		Pts: Bah 17; Rebs: D. Traore 12; Asts: A. Toure 3

Podvinny Mlyn Arena, Prague
Referees: Robert Vyklický (CZE), David Joao Domingos Manuel (ANG), Naohiko Uchihara (JPN)

1 July 2013
18:00

Boxscore

South Korea	96–95 (OT)	Czech Republic
Scoring by quarter: 18–22, 18–30, 30–20, 21–15, Overtime: 9–8
Pts: Heo Hoon 32; Rebs: Choi Seong-Mo 8 Asts: Cheon Gi-Beom, Heo Hoon 3		Pts: Peterka 24; Rebs: Peterka 21; Asts: three players 4

O2 Arena Prague, Prague
Referees: Nicolas Maestre (FRA), Alexey Davydov (RUS), Roberto Oliveros (VEN)

2 July 2013
13:15

Boxscore

Senegal	88–79	South Korea
Scoring by quarter: 21–22, 22–26, 20–18, 25–13
Pts: Ndoye 27; Rebs: Ndoye 16; Asts: Diatta, Sankare 2		Pts: Kang Sang-Jae 31; Rebs: Choi Jun-Yong 5 Asts: Choi Seong-Mo 7

Podvinny Mlyn Arena, Prague
Referees: Steven Marquis Anderson (USA), Sašo Petek (SLO), Naftal Candido Chongo (MOZ)

2 July 2013
18:00

Boxscore

Ivory Coast	59–69	Czech Republic
Scoring by quarter: 9–21, 5–16, 22–20, 23–12
Pts: A. Toure 18; Rebs: D. Traore 15; Asts: Bah, Meite 2		Pts: Slanina 16; Rebs: Slanina 9 Asts: Kouřil 7

O2 Arena Prague, Prague
Referees: Borys Shulga (UKR), Christopher Antony Reid (AUS), Ricor Buaron (PHI)

3 July 2013
13:15

Boxscore

South Korea	73–67	Ivory Coast
Scoring by quarter: 15–18, 25–18, 16–13, 17–18
Pts: Choi Jun-Yong 22; Rebs: Choi Jun-Yong 9 Asts: Choi Jun-Yong 7		Pts: D. Traore 22; Rebs: A. Toure 12; Asts: A. Toure 6

Podvinny Mlyn Arena, Prague
Referees: Panagiotis Anastopoulos (GRE), Marwan Egho (LIB), David Joao Domingos Manuel (ANG)

3 July 2013
18:00

Boxscore

Czech Republic	80–78	Senegal
Scoring by quarter: 16–22, 16–15, 30–26, 18–15
Pts: Slanina 19; Rebs: Slanina, Ausprunk 8 Asts: Kouřil 7		Pts: Diatta 20; Rebs: Ndoye 13; Asts: Sankare 4

O2 Arena Prague, Prague
Referees: Grzegorz Ziemblicki (POL), Naohiko Uchihara (JPN), Milija Vojinović (SRB)

=== 9th–12th place ===
Semi-finals
5 July
Iran	53
Brazil	63
5 July
Argentina	59
Russia	63

Ninth place
6 July
Brazil	53
Russia	60
Eleventh place
6 July
Iran	79
Argentina	68

==== Semifinals ====
5 July 2013
08:45

Boxscore

Iran	53–63	Brazil
Scoring by quarter: 10–19, 11–14, 15–14, 17–16
Pts: Yakhchali 17; Rebs: Rahmati 7 Asts: Beigiarbatsofla 2		Pts: Demetrio 14; Rebs: Demetrio 8 Asts: Siqueira 3

O2 Arena Prague, Prague
Referees: Robert Vyklický (CZE), Milija Vojinović (SRB), Marwan Egho (LIB)

5 July 2013
11:00

Boxscore

Argentina	59–63	Russia
Scoring by quarter: 16–25, 14–9, 18–13, 11–16
Pts: Torres 15; Rebs: Torres 10; Asts: Torres 3		Pts: Kulagin 20; Rebs: Kulagin 16; Asts: Annaev, Ilnitskiy 2

O2 Arena Prague, Prague
Referees: Benjamin Jiménez Trujillo (ESP), Sašo Petek (SLO), Roberto Oliveros (VEN)

==== Eleventh-place game ====
6 July 2013
08:45

Boxscore

Iran	79–68	Argentina
Scoring by quarter: 20–12, 19–14, 26–19, 14–23
Pts: Mashayekhi 26; Rebs: Yousofvand 12; Asts: Foroutan, Mashayekhi 3		Pts: Vaulet 20; Rebs: Torres 8 Asts: three players 2

O2 Arena Prague, Prague
Referees: Roberto Vazquez (PUR), Sašo Petek (SLO), Ricor Buaron (PHI)

==== Ninth-place game ====
6 July 2013
11:00

Boxscore

Brazil	53–60	Russia
Scoring by quarter: 14–19, 9–8, 11–15, 19–18
Pts: Ramos 20; Rebs: Ramos, Dias 7 Asts: three players 2		Pts: Kulagin 19; Rebs: Kulagin 8 Asts: Annaev 6

O2 Arena Prague, Prague
Referees: Christopher Antony Reid (AUS), Milija Vojinović (SRB), David Joao Domingos Manuel (ANG)

== Final round ==
Quarter-finals
5 July
Spain	76
Australia	87
5 July
Serbia	73
Croatia	66
5 July
China	58
Lithuania	89
5 July
Canada	67
United States	109

Semi-finals
6 July
Australia	58
Serbia	63
6 July
Lithuania	60
United States	100

Final
7 July
Serbia	68
United States	82
Third place
7 July
Australia	100
Lithuania	106 (OT)

5th place bracket

Semi-finals
6 July
Spain	75
Croatia	64
6 July
China	100
Canada	110 (3OT)

Fifth place
7 July
Spain	72
Canada	68
Seventh place
7 July
Croatia	80
China	94

=== Quarterfinals ===
5 July 2013
13:15

Boxscore

Lithuania	89–58	China
Scoring by quarter: 18–18, 26–14, 27–23, 18–13
Pts: Gintvainis, Grigonis 12; Rebs: Krestinin 11; Asts: Gintvainis, Dimša 4		Pts: Yuan Shuai 18; Rebs: Zhao Tianyi, Wu Quanxi 6 Asts: Wu Qian, Gao Shang 4

O2 Arena Prague, Prague
Referees: Roberto Chiari (ITA), Naohiko Uchihara (JPN), Christopher Antony Reid (AUS)

5 July 2013
15:30

Boxscore

Spain	76–87	Australia
Scoring by quarter: 15–19, 16–26, 17–21, 28–21
Pts: Díaz 19; Rebs: Saiz 9 Asts: five players 1		Pts: Exum 33; Rebs: Pineau 13; Asts: Exum, Martin 4

O2 Arena Prague, Prague
Referees: Panagiotis Anastopoulos (GRE), Borys Shulga (UKR), Alejandro Sánchez Varela (URU)

5 July 2013
18:00

Boxscore

Croatia	66–73	Serbia
Scoring by quarter: 17–24, 18–14, 16–21, 15–14
Pts: Šarić 30; Rebs: Šarić 9 Asts: Junaković, Šarić 4		Pts: Andrić 20; Rebs: Micić 8 Asts: Micić 8

O2 Arena Prague, Prague
Referees: Roberto Vazquez (PUR), Perry Stothart (CAN), Steven Marquis Anderson (USA)

5 July 2013
20:15

Boxscore

Canada	67–109	United States
Scoring by quarter: 22–30, 16–23, 12–31, 17–25
Pts: Rathan-Mayes 14; Rebs: Okolie 6 Asts: Keane 4		Pts: Smart 14; Rebs: Okafor 8 Asts: Sulaimon 4

O2 Arena Prague, Prague
Referees: Grzegorz Ziemblicki (POL), Alexey Davydov (RUS), Naftal Candido Chongo (MOZ)

=== Classification 5–8 ===
6 July 2013
13:15

Boxscore

Spain	75–64	Croatia
Scoring by quarter: 19–20, 19–16, 19–12, 18–16
Pts: Saiz 16; Rebs: Saiz 16; Asts: Brizuela 4		Pts: Šarić 20; Rebs: Šarić 9 Asts: Šarić 5

O2 Arena Prague, Prague
Referees: Panagiotis Anastopoulos (GRE), Grzegorz Ziemblicki (POL), Guilherme Locatelli (BRA)

6 July 2013
15:30

Boxscore

China	100–110 (3OT)	Canada
Scoring by quarter: 15–18, 17–14, 28–22, 18–24, Overtime: 7–7, 9–9, 6–16
Pts: Yuan Shuai 30; Rebs: Zhou Qi 14; Asts: Zhao Jiwei 11		Pts: Ennis 42; Rebs: Rathan-Mayes 9 Asts: Keane 7

O2 Arena Prague, Prague
Referees: Robert Vyklický (CZE), Leandro Nicolas Lezcano (ARG), Marwan Egho (LIB)

=== Semifinals ===
6 July 2013
18:00

Boxscore

Australia	58–63	Serbia
Scoring by quarter: 18–11, 7–21, 18–15, 15–16
Pts: Exum 21; Rebs: Duncan 7 Asts: Exum 4		Pts: N. Janković 20; Rebs: N. Janković 16; Asts: Micić 8

O2 Arena Prague, Prague
Referees: Roberto Chiari (ITA), Perry Stothart (CAN), Rüstü Nuran (TUR)

6 July 2013
20:15

Boxscore

Lithuania	60–100	United States
Scoring by quarter: 16–25, 10–22, 18–25, 16–28
Pts: Dimša, Tarolis 9 Rebs: Grigonis 4 Asts: Gintvainis 3		Pts: Smart 18; Rebs: Winslow 9 Asts: Williams-Goss 5

O2 Arena Prague, Prague
Referees: Benjamin Jiménez Trujillo (ESP), Nicolas Maestre (FRA), Roberto Oliveros (VEN)

=== Seventh-place game ===
7 July 2013
13:15

Boxscore

Croatia	80–94	China
Scoring by quarter: 14–28, 12–22, 20–25, 34–19
Pts: Mustapić 24; Rebs: Mustapić 7 Asts: Gulam 8		Pts: Gao Shang 33; Rebs: Gao Shang 7 Asts: Zhao Jiwei 8

O2 Arena Prague, Prague
Referees: Nicolas Maestre (FRA), Guilherme Locatelli (BRA), Alexey Davydov (RUS)

=== Fifth-place game ===
7 July 2013
15:30

Boxscore

Spain	72–68	Canada
Scoring by quarter: 14–8, 25–18, 21–20, 12–22
Pts: Saiz 18; Rebs: Saiz 11; Asts: Brizuela 5		Pts: Lyles 25; Rebs: Lyles 17; Asts: Rathan-Mayes 3

O2 Arena Prague, Prague
Referees: Rüstü Nuran (TUR), Alejandro Sánchez Varela (URU), Milija Vojinović (SRB)

=== Bronze-medal game ===
7 July 2013
18:00

Boxscore

Australia	100–106 (OT)	Lithuania
Scoring by quarter: 18–21, 16–21, 28–14, 23–29, Overtime: 15–21
Pts: Exum 28; Rebs: Pineau 17; Asts: Exum 5		Pts: Dimša 19; Rebs: Geben 9 Asts: Gintvainis, Lekavicius 3

O2 Arena Prague, Prague
Referees: Roberto Vazquez (PUR), Grzegorz Ziemblicki (POL), Robert Vyklický (CZE)

=== Final ===
7 July 2013
20:15

Boxscore

Serbia	68–82	United States
Scoring by quarter: 22–26, 16–14, 13–17, 17–25
Pts: Novak 21; Rebs: N. Janković 8 Asts: Micić 10		Pts: Harrell 17; Rebs: Frazier, Gordon 6 Asts: Payton 6

O2 Arena Prague, Prague
Referees: Panagiotis Anastopoulos (GRE), Christopher Antony Reid (AUS), Borys Shulga (UKR)

== Final standings ==
Rank	Team
1st place, gold medalist(s)	United States
2nd place, silver medalist(s)	Serbia
3rd place, bronze medalist(s)	Lithuania
4th	Australia
5th	Spain
6th	Canada
7th	China
8th	Croatia
9th	Russia
10th	Brazil
11th	Iran
12th	Argentina
13th	South Korea
14th	Czech Republic
15th	Ivory Coast
16th	Senegal

== Awards ==
2013 Under-19 World Championship winner

United States
Fifth title

Most Valuable Player
(United States) Aaron Gordon

All-Tournament Team

- (Serbia) Vasilije Micić
- (Australia) Dante Exum
- (United States) Aaron Gordon
- (Croatia) Dario Šarić
- (United States) Jahlil Okafor

== Referees ==
FIBA named 25 referees that officiated at the tournament.

- (Angola) David Joao Domingos Manuel
- (Argentina) Leandro Nicolas Lezcano
- (Australia) Christopher Antony Reid
- (Brazil) Guilherme Locatelli
- (Canada) Perry Stothart
- (China) Nan Ye
- (Czech Republic) Robert Vyklický
- (France) Nicolas Maestre
- (Greece) Panagiotis Anastopoulos
- (Italy) Roberto Chiari
- (Japan) Naohiko Uchihara
- (Lebanon) Marvan Egho
- (Mozambique) Naftal Candido Chongo
- (Philippines) Ricor Buaron
- (Poland) Grzegorz Ziemblicki
- (Puerto Rico) Roberto Vazquez
- (Russia) Alexey Davydov
- (Serbia) Milija Vojinović
- (Slovenia) Sašo Petek
- (Spain) Benjamin Jiménez Trujillo
- (Turkey) Rüştü Nuran
- (Ukraine) Borys Shulga
- (Uruguay) Alejandro Sánchez Varela
- (United States) Steven Marquis Anderson
- (Venezuela) Roberto Oliveros
