= 2012 FIBA Asia Under-18 Championship =

22nd FIBA Under-18 Asian Basketball Championship
- Official logo of the 2012 FIBA Asia Under-18 Championship

Tournament details
- Host country: Mongolia
- City: Ulan Bator
- Dates: August 17–26
- Teams: 16 (from 1 confederation)
- Venues: 2 (in 1 host city)

Final positions
- Champions: China (10th title)
- Runners-up: South Korea
- Third place: Iran

Tournament statistics
- MVP: (China) Wang Zhelin
- Top scorer: (China) Wang Z.L. (22.3)
- Top rebounds: (Bahrain) Shukralla (12.3)
- Top assists: (South Korea) Cheon G.B. (6.0)
- PPG (Team): China (109.6)
- RPG (Team): Iran (50.2)
- APG (Team): China (22.2)

Official website
- 2012 FIBA Asia U-18 Championship

The 2012 FIBA Asia Under-18 Championship was the 2012 edition of the FIBA Asia's youth basketball championship. The games were played in Ulan Bator, Mongolia between 17 and 26 August 2012. China defeated Korea in the championship to clinch their tenth title. The two finalists, together with third-place Iran, were qualified for the 2013 FIBA Under-19 World Championship.

== Qualification ==
According to the FIBA Asia rules, each zone had two places, and the hosts (Mongolia) and holders (China) were automatically qualified. The other four places are allocated to the zones according to performance in the 2010 FIBA Asia Under-18 Championship.

Central Asia (1)	East Asia (2+2+2)	Gulf (2)	South Asia (1)	Southeast Asia (2+1)	West Asia (2+1)
Kazakhstan	Mongolia	Bahrain	India	Philippines	Iran
	China	Saudi Arabia		Indonesia	Lebanon
	Chinese Taipei			Singapore	Syria
	Hong Kong				
	Japan				
	South Korea				

== Draw ==
The draw was held at the Sports Committee Central Office of the Mongolian Olympic Association on Friday July 27.

Group A	Group B	Group C	Group D
China; Hong Kong; Lebanon; India	South Korea; Japan; Singapore; Syria	Chinese Taipei; Indonesia; Bahrain; Mongolia	Iran; Kazakhstan; Philippines; Saudi Arabia

== Preliminary round ==
=== Group A ===
Team	Pld	W	L	PF	PA	PD	Pts
China	3	3	0	368	175	+193	6
Lebanon	3	2	1	252	227	+25	5
India	3	1	2	192	252	−60	4
Hong Kong	3	0	3	185	343	−158	3

August 17
14:00

Report

Lebanon	65–61	India
Scoring by quarter: 16–16, 14–18, 21–13, 14–14
Pts: Arakji 25; Rebs: Hadidian 11; Asts: Nemer 3		Pts: Brar 28; Rebs: A. Singh 8 Asts: L. Singh, Kanarjee, Sunder 2

Buyant-Ukhaa Arena, Ulan Bator
Referees: Wong Hwee Liak (SIN), Herman (INA), Choi Kyo-Youn (KOR)

August 17
16:00

Report

China	133–47	Hong Kong
Scoring by quarter: 34–15, 34–15, 44–5, 41–12
Pts: Wang Z.L. 28; Rebs: Wang Z.L. 10; Asts: Han D.L. 8		Pts: Ng C.Y. 18; Rebs: Ng C.Y. 3 Asts: Tsai C.K. 3

Buyant-Ukhaa Arena, Ulan Bator
Referees: Yunes Janahi (BRN), Takashi Ogata (JPN)

August 18
10:00

Report

Hong Kong	70–113	Lebanon
Scoring by quarter: 18–25, 11–34, 23–31, 18–23
Pts: Chang Y.F., Ng C.Y. 14; Rebs: Ng C.Y. 11; Asts: Chang Y.F. 7		Pts: Arakji 21; Rebs: Chamoun 8 Asts: Assi 6

Central Sport Hall, Ulan Bator
Referees: Glenn Cornelio (PHI), Ali Akbar Momeni (IRI), Shin Gi-Rok (KOR)

August 18
12:00

Report

India	54–119	China
Scoring by quarter: 4–27, 10–28, 19–33, 21–31
Pts: Sangwan 19; Rebs: Sangwan 10; Asts: Saminathan 6		Pts: Gao S. 22; Rebs: Bai B. 9 Asts: Yang J.M. 7

Central Sport Hall, Ulan Bator
Referees: Abdullah Al-Ajlan (KSA), Yevgeniy Mikheyev (KAZ), Richard Sim (SIN)

August 19
10:00

Report

Hong Kong	68–77	India
Scoring by quarter: 14–15, 14–18, 16–28, 24–16
Pts: Leung S.W. 18; Rebs: Ng C.Y. 11; Asts: Chang Y.F. 4		Pts: Brar 27; Rebs: Brar 17; Asts: Saminathan, L. Singh 6

Buyant-Ukhaa Arena, Ulan Bator
Referees: Ali Akbar Momeni (IRI), Yevgeniy Mikheyev (KAZ), Yunes Janahi (BRN)

August 19
12:00

Report

China	96–74	Lebanon
Scoring by quarter: 22–18, 29–14, 19–13, 26–29
Pts: Dai H.B. 27; Rebs: Dai H.B. 10; Asts: Wu Q., Li Q. 2		Pts: Arakji 28; Rebs: Salem 9 Asts: Six players 1

Buyant-Ukhaa Arena, Ulan Bator
Referees: Anton Kozlov (KAZ), Ehsan Sarbaz-Rahimi (IRI), Wong Hwee Liak (SIN)

=== Group B ===
Team	Pld	W	L	PF	PA	PD	Pts
South Korea	3	3	0	280	163	+117	6
Syria	3	2	1	213	197	+16	5
Japan	3	1	2	250	217	+33	4
Singapore	3	0	3	132	298	−166	3

August 17
10:00

Report

Singapore	47–78	Syria
Scoring by quarter: 13–14, 16–19, 11–26, 7–19
Pts: Tay D.L. 14; Rebs: J. Lim 6 Asts: Tay D.L. 3		Pts: Atli 14; Rebs: Atli 13; Asts: Baghajati 4

Buyant-Ukhaa Arena, Ulan Bator
Referees: Rajan Vellingirinathan (IND), Ibnu Susilo (INA), Ali Akbar Momeni (IRI)

August 17
12:00

Report

South Korea	91–69	Japan
Scoring by quarter: 28–16, 19–15, 27–16, 17–22
Pts: Lee J.H. 19; Rebs: Park I.T. 8 Asts: Cheon G.B. 3		Pts: Osaki 14; Rebs: Y. Watanabe 8 Asts: Narita 3

Buyant-Ukhaa Arena, Ulan Bator
Referees: Wu Liang-min (TPE), Glenn Cornelio (PHI)

August 18
14:00

Report

Japan	110–53	Singapore
Scoring by quarter: 30–12, 28–8, 28–23, 24–10
Pts: Sumino 24; Rebs: Sekido 8 Asts: Terazono 4		Pts: Tay D.L. 15; Rebs: J. Lim 7 Asts: Yeo 4

Buyant-Ukhaa Arena, Ulan Bator
Referees: Ciu Zhexiong (CHN), Edmond Ho (HKG), Ehsan Sarbaz-Rahimi (IRI)

August 18
16:00

Report

Syria	62–79	South Korea
Scoring by quarter: 21–24, 16–21, 14–20, 11–14
Pts: Atli, Shahin 11; Rebs: Shahin 7 Asts: Al-Zaim 4		Pts: Cheon G.B. 24; Rebs: Lee J.H. 16; Asts: Cheon G.B., Park I.T. 3

Buyant-Ukhaa Arena, Ulan Bator
Referees: Wu Liang-min (TPE), Anton Kozlov (KAZ), Rajan Vellingirinathan (IND)

August 19
10:00

Report

Japan	71–73	Syria
Scoring by quarter: 15–15, 19–19, 24–20, 13–19
Pts: Narita 19; Rebs: Y. Watanabe, Mori, Baba 9 Asts: Baba 4		Pts: Obaysi 21; Rebs: Atli 11; Asts: Baghajati 7

Central Sport Hall, Ulan Bator
Referees: Herman (INA), Ricor Buaron (PHI), Yuen Chun Yip (HKG)

August 19
12:00

Report

South Korea	110–32	Singapore
Scoring by quarter: 18–9, 35–5, 23–10, 34–8
Pts: Jung H.W. 20; Rebs: Choi J.Y. 14; Asts: Kim S.J. 7		Pts: J. Lim 9 Rebs: J. Lim 8 Asts: Low 2

Central Sport Hall, Ulan Bator
Referees: Ibnu Susilo (INA), Rajan Vellingirinathan (IND), Glenn Cornelio (PHI)

=== Group C ===
Team	Pld	W	L	PF	PA	PD	Pts	Tiebreaker
Chinese Taipei	3	3	0	300	147	+153	6	
Bahrain	3	1	2	223	240	−17	4	1–1 / 1.110
Indonesia	3	1	2	183	239	−56	4	1–1 / 0.993
Mongolia	3	1	2	189	269	−80	4	1–1 / 0.907

August 17
10:00

Report

Chinese Taipei	99–44	Indonesia
Scoring by quarter: 24–8, 25–9, 22–11, 28–16
Pts: Lu K.H., Fan S.E. 18; Rebs: Lee C.J., Fan S.E. 9 Asts: Chiu J.C. 5		Pts: Panagan, Halim 11; Rebs: Halim 8 Asts: Five players 1

Central Sport Hall, Ulan Bator
Referees: Ricor Buaron (PHI), Ehsan Sarbaz-Rahimi (IRI), Edmond Ho (HKG)

August 17
20:00

Report

Bahrain	95–74	Mongolia
Scoring by quarter: 10–20, 27–18, 30–16, 28–20
Pts: Naser 24; Rebs: Shukralla 15; Asts: Bu-Allay 5		Pts: Munkhnasan 21; Rebs: Khash-Erdene 10; Asts: Anar-Erdene 8

Buyant-Ukhaa Arena, Ulan Bator
Referees: Richard Sim (SIN), Yuen Chun Yip (HKG), Anton Kozlov (KAZ)

August 18
10:00

Report

Indonesia	72–67	Bahrain
Scoring by quarter: 19–12, 6–26, 23–14, 24–15
Pts: Panagan 17; Rebs: Halim 12; Asts: Lapian 4		Pts: Bu-Allay 24; Rebs: Shukralla 11; Asts: Four players 2

Buyant-Ukhaa Arena, Ulan Bator
Referees: Kenichi Kaba (JPN), Mozahem Hwig (SYR), Ricor Buaron (PHI)

August 18
20:00

Report

Mongolia	42–107	Chinese Taipei
Scoring by quarter: 10–26, 11–31, 11–29, 10–21
Pts: Munkhnasan 15; Rebs: Enkhtaivan 7 Asts: Anar-Erdene, Enkhtugs 2		Pts: Huang T.H. 18; Rebs: Lee C.J. 10; Asts: Chiu J.C., Lin K.C., Huang H.H. 3

Buyant-Ukhaa Arena, Ulan Bator
Referees: Wong Hwee Liak (SIN), Sharad Vasant Bansode (IND), Takashi Ogata (JPN)

August 19
14:00

Report

Chinese Taipei	94–61	Bahrain
Scoring by quarter: 22–13, 14–22, 25–13, 33–13
Pts: Wu C.C., Huang T.H., Lin K.C. 14; Rebs: Lin K.C., Huang H.H. 7 Asts: Wu C.C., Lin K.C. 4		Pts: Shukralla 16; Rebs: Shukralla 9 Asts: Shukralla 4

Buyant-Ukhaa Arena, Ulan Bator
Referees: Choi Kyo-Youn (KOR), Mahammad Ismail (SYR), Edmond Ho (HKG)

August 19
20:00

Report

Indonesia	67–73	Mongolia
Scoring by quarter: 8–16, 18–22, 16–16, 25–19
Pts: Panagan 16; Rebs: Pangesthio 13; Asts: Panagan, Pangesthio, Sitorus 2		Pts: Munkhnasan 33; Rebs: Enkhtaivan 9 Asts: Munkhnasan 4

Buyant-Ukhaa Arena, Ulan Bator
Referees: Mozahem Hwig (SYR), Shin Gi-Rok (KOR), Abdullah Al-Ajlan (KSA)

=== Group D ===
Team	Pld	W	L	PF	PA	PD	Pts
Iran	3	3	0	284	172	+112	6
Philippines	3	2	1	250	214	+36	5
Saudi Arabia	3	1	2	182	246	−64	4
Kazakhstan	3	0	3	180	264	−84	3

August 17
12:00

Report

Iran	105–46	Kazakhstan
Scoring by quarter: 17–11, 32–8, 28–9, 28–18
Pts: Yakhchali 21; Rebs: Dalirzahan 9 Asts: Mashayekhi, Dalirzahan 5		Pts: Marchuk 16; Rebs: Marchuk, Nalogov 5 Asts: Maxutov 2

Central Sport Hall, Ulan Bator
Referees: Tsai Fu-shan (TPE), Ciu Zhexiong (CHN), Kenichi Kaba (JPN)

August 17
18:00

Report

Philippines	95–52	Saudi Arabia
Scoring by quarter: 23–12, 26–17, 27–16, 19–7
Pts: Suarez 15; Rebs: Bonleon 7 Asts: Nambatac 4		Pts: Faqihi 19; Rebs: Faqihi, Abo-Jalas 6 Asts: Bakhashwain 2

Buyant-Ukhaa Arena, Ulan Bator
Referees: Shin Gi-Rok (KOR), Walid Abi Rached (LIB), Sharad Vasant Bansode (IND)

August 18
12:00

Report

Kazakhstan	69–83	Philippines
Scoring by quarter: 18–18, 12–20, 22–17, 17–28
Pts: Kurochka, Maxutov 22; Rebs: Marchuk 8 Asts: Marchuk 4		Pts: Bonleon 20; Rebs: Javelosa 12; Asts: Cani, Olayon 4

Buyant-Ukhaa Arena, Ulan Bator
Referees: Walid Abi Rached (LIB), Tsai Fu-shan (TPE), Herman (INA)

August 18
18:00

Report

Saudi Arabia	54–86	Iran
Scoring by quarter: 11–23, 14–17, 20–24, 9–22
Pts: Faqihi 18; Rebs: Abo-Jalas 6 Asts: Four players 2		Pts: Yakhchali 31; Rebs: Foroutan, Rahmati 10; Asts: Mashayekhi 6

Buyant-Ukhaa Arena, Ulan Bator
Referees: Yuen Chun Yip (HKG), Yunes Janahi (BRN), Choi Kyo-Youn (KOR)

August 19
16:00

Report

Iran	93–72	Philippines
Scoring by quarter: 22–17, 20–16, 23–15, 28–24
Pts: Dalirzahan 21; Rebs: Rahmati 14; Asts: Foroutan, Yakhchali 5		Pts: Alejandro 12; Rebs: Javelosa 7 Asts: Pingoy 4

Buyant-Ukhaa Arena, Ulan Bator
Referees: Sharad Vasant Bansode (IND), Kenichi Kaba (JPN), Wu Liang-min (TPE)

August 19
18:00

Report

Kazakhstan	65–76	Saudi Arabia
Scoring by quarter: 15–22, 20–22, 21–14, 9–18
Pts: Kurochka 19; Rebs: Marchuk 11; Asts: Maxutov 5		Pts: Abo-Jalas 21; Rebs: Abo-Jalas 12; Asts: Al-Hosawe 6

Buyant-Ukhaa Arena, Ulan Bator
Referees: Takashi Ogata (JPN), Ciu Zhexiong (CHN), Walid Abi Rached (LIB)

== Second round ==
- The results and the points of the matches between the same teams that were already played during the preliminary round shall be taken into account for the second round.

=== Group E ===
Team	Pld	W	L	PF	PA	PD	Pts	Tiebreaker
China	5	5	0	561	374	+187	10	
South Korea	5	4	1	490	374	+116	9	
Japan	5	2	3	407	455	−48	7	1–1 / 1.065
Lebanon	5	2	3	375	418	−43	7	1–1 / 1.042
Syria	5	2	3	347	399	−52	7	1–1 / 0.895
India	5	0	5	316	476	−160	5	

August 20
16:00

Report

China	138–73	Japan
Scoring by quarter: 29–10, 35–26, 38–17, 36–20
Pts: Wang Z.L. 36; Rebs: Wang Z.L. 17; Asts: Wu Q. 7		Pts: Sugiura 17; Rebs: Sugiura 5 Asts: Narita 3

Buyant-Ukhaa Arena, Ulan Bator
Referees: Ehsan Sarbaz-Rahimi (IRI), Glenn Cornelio (PHI)

August 20
18:00

Report

Lebanon	91–72	Syria
Scoring by quarter: 20–13, 19–21, 21–14, 31–24
Pts: Arakji 33; Rebs: Arakji 9 Asts: Mezher, Nemer 2		Pts: Trab 23; Rebs: Hashem, Shahin 9 Asts: Baghajati 4

Buyant-Ukhaa Arena, Ulan Bator
Referees: Wong Hwee Liak (SIN), Edmond Ho (HKG), Yevgeniy Mikheyev (KAZ)

August 20
20:00

Report

India	73–123	South Korea
Scoring by quarter: 23–35, 9–29, 25–30, 16–29
Pts: Kanarjee 25; Rebs: Sangwan 11; Asts: L. Singh 6		Pts: Lee J.H. 29; Rebs: Lee J.H. 8 Asts: Choi S.M. 6

Buyant-Ukhaa Arena, Ulan Bator
Referees: Ricor Buaron (PHI), Richard Sim (SIN), Herman (INA)

August 21
16:00

Report

Syria	71–101	China
Scoring by quarter: 11–18, 14–27, 24–31, 22–25
Pts: Baghajati 22; Rebs: Shahin 8 Asts: Baghajati 4		Pts: Wang Z.L. 22; Rebs: Wang Z.L. 11; Asts: Luo H.C. 7

Buyant-Ukhaa Arena, Ulan Bator
Referees: Herman (INA), Ehsan Sarbaz-Rahimi (IRI), Ricor Buaron (PHI)

August 21
18:00

Report

South Korea	95–63	Lebanon
Scoring by quarter: 24–10, 26–17, 14–21, 31–15
Pts: Kang S.J. 28; Rebs: Lee J.H. 12; Asts: Cheon G.B. 11		Pts: Arakji 16; Rebs: Chamoun 7 Asts: Mezher 3

Buyant-Ukhaa Arena, Ulan Bator
Referees: Glenn Cornelio (PHI), Anton Kozlov (KAZ), Yuen Chun Yip (HKG)

August 21
20:00

Report

Japan	100–71	India
Scoring by quarter: 29–17, 27–18, 24–14, 20–22
Pts: Osaki 20; Rebs: Y. Watanabe 9 Asts: Terazono 4		Pts: Brar 31; Rebs: Brar 14; Asts: L. Singh 7

Buyant-Ukhaa Arena, Ulan Bator
Referees: Yunes Janahi (BRN), Wu Liang-min (TPE)

August 22
16:00

Report

China	107–102 (OT)	South Korea
Scoring by quarter: 20–19, 16–25, 29–22, 23–22, Overtime: 19–14
Pts: Wang Z.L. 33; Rebs: Wang Z.L. 15; Asts: Gao S. 7		Pts: Cheon G.B. 21; Rebs: Lee J.H. 9 Asts: Cheon G.B. 5

Buyant-Ukhaa Arena, Ulan Bator
Referees: Anton Kozlov (KAZ), Herman (INA), Glenn Cornelio (PHI)

August 22
18:00

Report

Lebanon	82–94	Japan
Scoring by quarter: 18–22, 18–28, 20–21, 26–23
Pts: Salem 15; Rebs: El Ali 8 Asts: Mezher, Salem 4		Pts: Narita 26; Rebs: Y. Watanabe 11; Asts: Terazono 12

Buyant-Ukhaa Arena, Ulan Bator
Referees: Wong Hwee Liak (SIN), Yunes Janahi (BRN)

August 22
20:00

Report

India	57–69	Syria
Scoring by quarter: 17–14, 17–17, 10–22, 13–16
Pts: Brar 19; Rebs: Brar 13; Asts: L. Singh 5		Pts: Trab 18; Rebs: Trab, Atli 10; Asts: Trab, Baghajati 5

Buyant-Ukhaa Arena, Ulan Bator
Referees: Wu Liang-min (TPE), Edmond Ho (HKG), Ehsan Sarbaz-Rahimi (IRI)

=== Group F ===
Team	Pld	W	L	PF	PA	PD	Pts	Tiebreaker
Iran	5	4	1	440	306	+134	9	1–1 / 1.133
Chinese Taipei	5	4	1	436	311	+125	9	1–1 / 0.976
Philippines	5	4	1	442	362	+80	9	1–1 / 0.909
Saudi Arabia	5	1	4	292	405	−113	6	1–1 / 1.021
Indonesia	5	1	4	271	424	−153	6	1–1 / 0.993
Bahrain	5	1	4	351	424	−73	6	1–1 / 0.986

August 20
10:00

Report

Chinese Taipei	82–41	Saudi Arabia
Scoring by quarter: 21–7, 17–13, 21–11, 23–10
Pts: Huang T.H. 14; Rebs: Lee C.J., Huang H.H. 6 Asts: Lin K.C. 3		Pts: Al-Hosawe 14; Rebs: Abo-Jalas 11; Asts: Sufyani 2

Buyant-Ukhaa Arena, Ulan Bator
Referees: Rajan Vellingirinathan (IND), Kenichi Kaba (JPN), Mozahem Hwig (SYR)

August 20
12:00

Report

Indonesia	62–88	Philippines
Scoring by quarter: 18–23, 12–22, 18–22, 14–21
Pts: Panagan 12; Rebs: Panagan 6 Asts: Adrianno 4		Pts: Pingoy 16; Rebs: Nambatac 9 Asts: Cani 4

Buyant-Ukhaa Arena, Ulan Bator
Referees: Anton Kozlov (KAZ), Shin Gi-Rok (KOR), Sharad Vasant Bansode (IND)

August 20
14:00

Report

Bahrain	76–87	Iran
Scoring by quarter: 16–21, 18–25, 16–16, 26–25
Pts: Melad 19; Rebs: Shukralla 12; Asts: Bu-Allay 4		Pts: Mashayekhi 26; Rebs: Yazdanpanah 7 Asts: Mashayekhi 5

Buyant-Ukhaa Arena, Ulan Bator
Referees: Yuen Chun Yip (HKG), Takashi Ogata (JPN), Ciu Zhexiong (CHN)

August 21
10:00

Report

Philippines	88–83	Chinese Taipei
Scoring by quarter: 17–14, 26–20, 20–30, 25–19
Pts: Pingoy 25; Rebs: Alejandro 9 Asts: Pingoy 5		Pts: Lin K.C. 25; Rebs: Huang H.H. 7 Asts: Wu C.C. 7

Buyant-Ukhaa Arena, Ulan Bator
Referees: Kenichi Kaba (JPN), Rajan Vellingirinathan (IND), Yevgeniy Mikheyev (KAZ)

August 21
12:00

Report

Iran	97–26	Indonesia
Scoring by quarter: 29–9, 20–1, 21–13, 27–3
Pts: Bagheri 23; Rebs: Bagheri 11; Asts: Beigi 6		Pts: Tuasela 9 Rebs: Halim, Pangesthio 4 Asts: Four players 1

Buyant-Ukhaa Arena, Ulan Bator
Referees: Edmond Ho (HKG), Walid Abi Rached (LIB), Choi Kyo-Youn (KOR)

August 21
14:00

Report

Saudi Arabia	72–75	Bahrain
Scoring by quarter: 15–15, 11–26, 18–26, 28–8
Pts: Abo-Jalas 25; Rebs: Abo-Jalas 20; Asts: Al-Hosawe 3		Pts: Naser 25; Rebs: Shukralla 11; Asts: Abul, Shukralla 5

Buyant-Ukhaa Arena, Ulan Bator
Referees: Ciu Zhexiong (CHN), Wong Hwee Liak (SIN), Sharad Vasant Bansode (IND)

August 22
10:00

Report

Chinese Taipei	78–77 (OT)	Iran
Scoring by quarter: 22–24, 11–15, 16–16, 20–14, Overtime: 9–8
Pts: Lee C.J. 22; Rebs: Fan S.E. 7 Asts: Wu C.C. 4		Pts: Dalirzahan 22; Rebs: Foroutan 16; Asts: Yakhchali 4

Buyant-Ukhaa Arena, Ulan Bator
Referees: Yevgeniy Mikheyev (KAZ), Choi Kyo-Youn (KOR), Yuen Chun Yip (HKG)

August 22
12:00

Report

Indonesia	67–73	Saudi Arabia
Scoring by quarter: 10–17, 20–10, 14–21, 23–25
Pts: Kokodiputra 21; Rebs: Pangesthio 7 Asts: Panagan, Lapian 3		Pts: Faqihi 21; Rebs: Mohammed 11; Asts: Al-Hosawe 7

Buyant-Ukhaa Arena, Ulan Bator
Referees: Shin Gi-Rok (KOR), Sharad Vasant Bansode (IND), Walid Abi Rached (LIB)

August 22
14:00

Report

Bahrain	72–99	Philippines
Scoring by quarter: 22–13, 24–22, 15–38, 11–26
Pts: Shukralla 32; Rebs: Shukralla 12; Asts: Abul 5		Pts: Alejandro 23; Rebs: Olayon 12; Asts: Pingoy, Suarez 3

Buyant-Ukhaa Arena, Ulan Bator
Referees: Takashi Ogata (JPN), Ciu Zhexiong (CHN), Rajan Vellingirinathan (IND)

== Classification 13th–16th ==
Semifinals
August 20
Hong Kong	75
Singapore	64
August 20
Mongolia	60
Kazakhstan	52

13th place
August 21
Hong Kong	98
Mongolia	81
15th place
August 21
Singapore	59
Kazakhstan	76

=== Semifinals ===
August 20
10:00

Report

Hong Kong	75–64	Singapore
Scoring by quarter: 18–14, 19–20, 15–17, 23–13
Pts: Tsai C.K. 21; Rebs: Ng C.Y. 9 Asts: Chang Y.F. 5		Pts: Low 17; Rebs: Tay D.L. 10; Asts: Chee K.L., Tay D.L. 3

Central Sport Hall, Ulan Bator
Referees: Tsai Fu-shan (TPE), Abdullah Al-Ajlan (KSA), Walid Abi Rached (LIB)

August 20
12:00

Report

Mongolia	60–52	Kazakhstan
Scoring by quarter: 20–13, 21–14, 6–12, 13–13
Pts: Enkhtaivan 15; Rebs: Khash-Erdene 16; Asts: Munkhnasan 6		Pts: Kurochka 18; Rebs: Marchuk 18; Asts: Kurochka 3

Central Sport Hall, Ulan Bator
Referees: Wu Liang-min (TPE), Choi Kyo-Youn (KOR), Mahammad Ismail (SYR)

=== 15th place ===
August 21
10:00

Report

Singapore	59–76	Kazakhstan
Scoring by quarter: 15–22, 8–17, 13–22, 23–15
Pts: Tay D.L. 14; Rebs: J. Lim 7 Asts: Tay W.C. 4		Pts: Marchuk 15; Rebs: Marchuk 14; Asts: Marchuk 7

Central Sport Hall, Ulan Bator
Referees: Mozahem Hwig (SYR), Tsai Fu-shan (TPE), Ibnu Susilo (INA)

=== 13th place ===
August 21
12:00

Report

Hong Kong	98–81	Mongolia
Scoring by quarter: 23–26, 30–14, 20–19, 25–22
Pts: Chung H.W. 21; Rebs: Ng C.Y. 8 Asts: Chang Y.F. 6		Pts: Munkhnasan 31; Rebs: Enkhtaivan 10; Asts: Munkhnasan 5

Central Sport Hall, Ulan Bator
Referees: Mahammad Ismail (SYR), Richard Sim (SIN)

== Classification 9th–12th ==
Semifinals
August 24
Syria	80
Bahrain	70
August 24
India	67
Indonesia	53

9th place
August 25
Syria	86
India	76
11th place
August 25
Bahrain	64
Indonesia	67

=== Semifinals ===
August 24
10:00

Report

Syria	80–70	Bahrain
Scoring by quarter: 16–14, 19–17, 23–23, 22–16
Pts: Trab 24; Rebs: Trab 8 Asts: Baghajati 7		Pts: Shukralla, Sayed 20; Rebs: Shukralla 13; Asts: Abul, Bu-Allay 4

Buyant-Ukhaa Arena, Ulan Bator
Referees: Shin Gi-Rok (KOR), Walid Abi Rached (LIB), Edmond Ho (HKG)

August 24
12:00

Report

India	67–53	Indonesia
Scoring by quarter: 14–16, 18–8, 14–13, 21–16
Pts: Brar 24; Rebs: Sangwan 14; Asts: Kanarjee 4		Pts: Halim 12; Rebs: Halim 15; Asts: Four players 2

Buyant-Ukhaa Arena, Ulan Bator
Referees: Ehsan Sarbaz-Rahimi (IRI), Wu Liang-min (TPE), Ciu Zhexiong (CHN)

=== 11th place ===
August 25
10:00

Report

Bahrain	64–67	Indonesia
Scoring by quarter: 14–11, 11–14, 21–22, 18–20
Pts: Bu-Allay 15; Rebs: Shukralla 15; Asts: Bu-Allay, Sayed 4		Pts: Sitorus 14; Rebs: Kosasih 8 Asts: Panagan 5

Buyant-Ukhaa Arena, Ulan Bator
Referees: Glenn Cornelio (PHI), Mahammad Ismail (SYR)

=== 9th place ===
August 25
12:00

Report

Syria	86–76	India
Scoring by quarter: 20–17, 22–12, 27–30, 17–17
Pts: Trab 27; Rebs: Trab 8 Asts: Obaysi, Baghajati 5		Pts: Brar 27; Rebs: Sangwan 15; Asts: Narendar 8

Buyant-Ukhaa Arena, Ulan Bator
Referees: Choi Kyo-Youn (KOR), Edmond Ho (HKG), Tsai Fu-shan (TPE)

== Final round ==
Quarterfinals
August 24
Chinese Taipei	67
Japan	68
August 24
Saudi Arabia	33
China	76
August 24
South Korea	90
Philippines	77
August 24
Lebanon	47
Iran	84

Semifinals
August 25
Japan	80
China	103
August 25
South Korea	96
Iran	93

Final
August 26
China	93
South Korea	91
3rd place
August 26
Japan	83
Iran	87

Semifinals
August 25
Chinese Taipei	77
Saudi Arabia	38
August 25
Philippines	80
Lebanon	69

5th place
August 26
Chinese Taipei	89
Philippines	85
7th place
August 26
Saudi Arabia	78
Lebanon	89

=== Quarterfinals ===
August 24
14:00

Report

Chinese Taipei	67–68	Japan
Scoring by quarter: 16–27, 24–14, 13–15, 14–12
Pts: Fan S.E. 18; Rebs: Fan S.E. 17; Asts: Wu C.C., Huang T.H., Li Y.W. 3		Pts: Narita 31; Rebs: Y. Watanabe, Baba 8 Asts: Terazono 8

Buyant-Ukhaa Arena, Ulan Bator
Referees: Anton Kozlov (KAZ), Ricor Buaron (PHI), Sharad Vasant Bansode (IND)

August 24
16:00

Report

Saudi Arabia	33–76	China
Scoring by quarter: 12–18, 8–22, 7–15, 6–21
Pts: Abo-Jalas 9 Rebs: Al-Hosawe 7 Asts: Khalil, Al-Hosawe, Abo-Jalas 2		Pts: Yang J.M. 11; Rebs: Zhou Q. 8 Asts: Wu Q., Zhou Q. 4

Buyant-Ukhaa Arena, Ulan Bator
Referees: Glenn Cornelio (PHI), Choi Kyo-Youn (KOR)

August 24
18:00

Report

South Korea	90–77	Philippines
Scoring by quarter: 22–19, 25–22, 22–14, 21–22
Pts: Lee J.H. 26; Rebs: Lee J.H. 18; Asts: Cheon G.B., Heo H. 5		Pts: Pingoy 19; Rebs: Nambatac 7 Asts: Cani, Pingoy 3

Buyant-Ukhaa Arena, Ulan Bator
Referees: Yuen Chun Yip (HKG), Wong Hwee Liak (SIN), Takashi Ogata (JPN)

August 24
20:00

Report

Lebanon	47–84	Iran
Scoring by quarter: 11–18, 15–18, 8–31, 13–19
Pts: El Ali 10; Rebs: El Ali 9 Asts: Arakji, Nemer 2		Pts: Dalirzahan 22; Rebs: Mashayekhi 10; Asts: Mashayekhi 6

Buyant-Ukhaa Arena, Ulan Bator
Referees: Yevgeniy Mikheyev (KAZ), Rajan Vellingirinathan (IND)

=== Semifinals 5th–8th ===
August 25
14:00

Report

Chinese Taipei	77–38	Saudi Arabia
Scoring by quarter: 14–10, 12–13, 28–7, 23–8
Pts: Fan S.E. 17; Rebs: Fan S.E. 13; Asts: Cheng C.K. 6		Pts: Abo-Jalas 17; Rebs: Abo-Jalas 10; Asts: Al-Hosawe 2

Buyant-Ukhaa Arena, Ulan Bator
Referees: Kenichi Kaba (JPN), Shin Gi-Rok (KOR), Rajan Vellingirinathan (IND)

August 25
16:00

Report

Philippines	80–69	Lebanon
Scoring by quarter: 22–21, 19–17, 20–12, 19–19
Pts: Bonleon 19; Rebs: Babilonia 8 Asts: Alejandro 6		Pts: Salem 18; Rebs: Hadidian 9 Asts: Arakji 5

Buyant-Ukhaa Arena, Ulan Bator
Referees: Ali Akbar Momeni (IRI), Herman (INA), Takashi Ogata (JPN)

=== Semifinals ===
August 25
18:00

Report

Japan	80–103	China
Scoring by quarter: 23–24, 15–30, 16–17, 26–32
Pts: Narita 17; Rebs: Y. Watanabe, Mori, R. Watanabe 4 Asts: Osaki, Terazono, Sumino 2		Pts: Dai H.B. 23; Rebs: Wang Z.L. 10; Asts: Luo H.C., Gao S. 4

Buyant-Ukhaa Arena, Ulan Bator
Referees: Yunes Janahi (BRN), Anton Kozlov (KAZ)

August 25
20:00

Report

South Korea	96–93	Iran
Scoring by quarter: 15–25, 27–23, 26–23, 28–22
Pts: Choi J.Y. 38; Rebs: Lee J.H. 11; Asts: Cheon G.B. 12		Pts: Dalirzahan 20; Rebs: Yousefvand 12; Asts: Mashayekhi 3

Buyant-Ukhaa Arena, Ulan Bator
Referees: Ricor Buaron (PHI), Yuen Chun Yip (HKG), Yevgeniy Mikheyev (KAZ)

=== 7th place ===
August 26
14:00

Report

Saudi Arabia	78–89	Lebanon
Scoring by quarter: 16–21, 22–15, 14–26, 26–27
Pts: Faqihi, Abo-Jalas 19; Rebs: Al-Hosawe, Abo-Jalas, Mohammed 7 Asts: Al-Hosawe 8		Pts: Arakji 31; Rebs: Chamoun 9 Asts: Arakji 6

Buyant-Ukhaa Arena, Ulan Bator
Referees: Ciu Zhexiong (CHN), Wu Liang-min (TPE), Sharad Vasant Bansode (IND)

=== 5th place ===
August 26
16:00

Report

Chinese Taipei	89–85	Philippines
Scoring by quarter: 22–20, 13–14, 25–14, 29–37
Pts: Fan S.E. 21; Rebs: Fan S.E. 11; Asts: Wu C.C., Lin K.C. 4		Pts: Alejandro 22; Rebs: Rivero 10; Asts: Pingoy, Rivero 3

Buyant-Ukhaa Arena, Ulan Bator
Referees: Ehsan Sarbaz-Rahimi (IRI), Yuen Chun Yip (HKG), Herman (INA)

=== 3rd place ===
August 26
18:00

Report

Japan	83–87	Iran
Scoring by quarter: 14–31, 32–18, 17–21, 20–17
Pts: Narita 25; Rebs: Y. Watanabe, Baba 8 Asts: Baba 5		Pts: Mashayekhi 26; Rebs: Foroutan, Mashayekhi 11; Asts: Mashayekhi 12

Buyant-Ukhaa Arena, Ulan Bator
Referees: Yevgeniy Mikheyev (KAZ), Glenn Cornelio (PHI)

=== Final ===
August 26
20:00

Report

China	93–91	South Korea
Scoring by quarter: 24–26, 23–18, 14–27, 32–20
Pts: Wang Z.L. 30; Rebs: Wang Z.L. 13; Asts: Luo H.C., Wu Q. 4		Pts: Lee J.H. 24; Rebs: Choi J.Y., Lee J.H. 7 Asts: Cheon G.B. 9

Buyant-Ukhaa Arena, Ulan Bator
Referees: Anton Kozlov (KAZ), Ricor Buaron (PHI), Walid Abi Rached (LIB)

== Final standing ==
Qualified for the 2013 FIBA Under-19 World Championship

Rank	Team	Record
1st place, gold medalist(s)	China	9–0
2nd place, silver medalist(s)	South Korea	7–2
3rd place, bronze medalist(s)	Iran	7–2
4	Japan	4–5
5	Chinese Taipei	7–2
6	Philippines	6–3
7	Lebanon	4–5
8	Saudi Arabia	2–7
9	Syria	5–3
10	India	2–6
11	Indonesia	2–6
12	Bahrain	2–6
13	Hong Kong	2–3
14	Mongolia	2–3
15	Kazakhstan	1–4
16	Singapore	0–5

== Awards ==
2012 Asian Under-18 champions

China
Tenth title

All-Star Team:

- PG – (China) Luo Hanchen
- SG – (South Korea) Choi Jun-Yong
- SF – (Iran) Vahid Dalirzahan
- PF – (China) Wang Zhelin
- C – (South Korea) Lee Jong-Hyun
