= Masahiro Narita =

Japanese basketball player

Personal information
- Born: April 13, 1994 (age 32) Kanie, Aichi, Japan
- Listed height: 5 ft 8.5 in (1.74 m)
- Listed weight: 158.73 lb (72 kg)

Career information
- High school: Fujieda Meisei (Fujieda, Shizuoka)
- College: Takushoku University
- Playing career: 2017–2019
- Position: Point guard
- Number: 13

Career history
- 2017–2018: Toyotsu Fighting Eagles Nagoya
- 2018-2019: Akita Northern Happinets

Career highlights
- Kanto College Basketball Federation 3-point leader (2016)

Masahiro Narita (成田 正弘, Narita Masahiro; born April 13, 1994) is a Japanese former professional basketball player who last played for the Akita Northern Happinets of the B.League in Japan. He also played college basketball for Takushoku University.

== Non-FIBA Events Stats ==
Year	Team	GP	GS	MPG	FG%	3P%	FT%	RPG	APG	SPG	BPG	PPG
2015	Universiade	8		5.29	.429	.333	.000	1.1	0.4	0.4	0.0	1.9

== Career statistics ==
Legend
GP	Games played	GS	Games started	MPG	Minutes per game
FG%	Field goal percentage	3P%	3-point field goal percentage	FT%	Free throw percentage
RPG	Rebounds per game	APG	Assists per game	SPG	Steals per game
BPG	Blocks per game	PPG	Points per game	**Bold**	Career high

=== Regular season ===
Year	Team	GP	GS	MPG	FG%	3P%	FT%	RPG	APG	SPG	BPG	PPG
2016-17	FE Nagoya	26	2	18.9	31.5	30.0	65.5	2.0	1.8	0.5	0.2	5.2
2017-18	FE Nagoya	48	33	22.9	33.2	27.9	67.5	1.8	3.8	0.9	0.0	6.1
2018-19	Akita	53	20	14.4	25.8	22.8	75.0	1.4	1.5	0.5	0.0	3.0
Career		127	55	18.5	.306	.268	.694	1.7	2.4	0.7	0.0	4.6

=== Early cup games ===
Year	Team	GP	GS	MPG	FG%	3P%	FT%	RPG	APG	SPG	BPG	PPG
2018	Akita	2	0	28.12	.143	.333	.500	2.0	1.0	0.5	0	2.5

=== Preseason games ===
Year	Team	GP	GS	MPG	FG%	3P%	FT%	RPG	APG	SPG	BPG	PPG
2018	Akita	2	1	17.8	.429	.500	.333	2.0	2.5	1.0	0.0	4.5

Source: Changwon1Changwon2
