= Édgar Vicedo =

Spanish basketball player (born 1994)

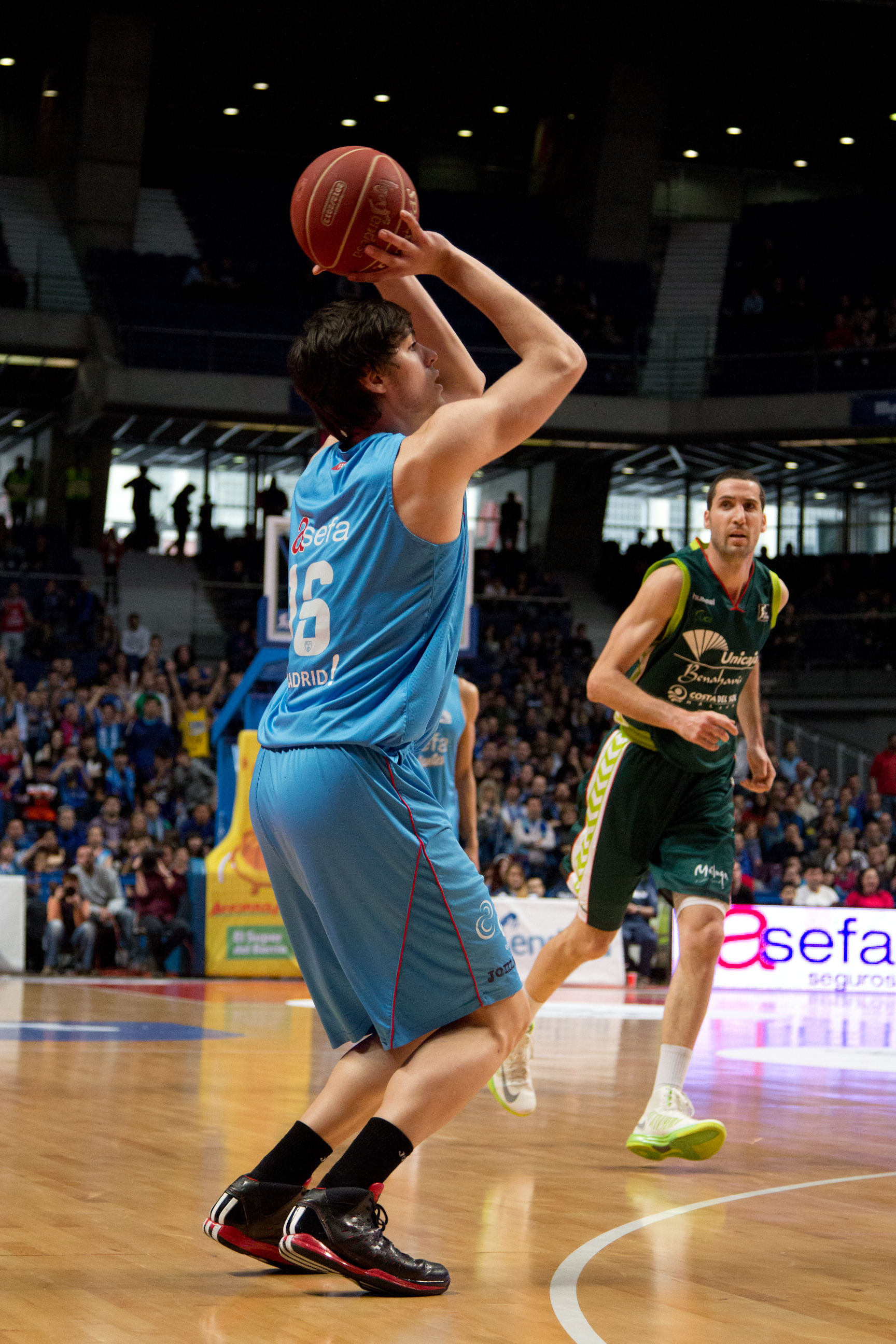
- Vicedo Estudiantes VS Unicaja Málaga

No. 00 – CB Breogán
- Position: Small forward
- League: Liga ACB

Personal information
- Born: 24 August 1994 (age 32) Madrid, Spain
- Listed height: 2.04 m (6 ft 8 in)

Career information
- Playing career: 2012–present

Career history
- 2012–2021: Estudiantes
- 2014–2015: →Peñas Huesca
- 2021: Unicaja
- 2021: Fuenlabrada
- 2021–2023: Obradoiro
- 2023–2024: Lenovo Tenerife
- 2024–2025: Granada
- 2025–2026: Bàsquet Menorca
- 2026–present: CB Breogán
Medals
Men's basketball
Representing Spain
U20 European Championship
Silver medal – second place	2014 Greece	U20 National Team

Édgar Vicedo Ayala (born 24 August 1994) is a Spanish professional basketball player for Río Breogán of the Spanish Liga ACB.

== Professional career ==
After playing in the youth teams of Estudiantes, Vicedo made his debut in the Liga ACB in the first matchday of the 2012–13 season, where his club won by 101–86 to CB Canarias.

In February 2014, he was loaned to Peñas Huesca of the LEB Oro league until the end of the 2013–14 season. In Summer 2014, Vicedo was loaned again to Peñas, where he became the MVP of the round 21.

After 2014-15 season, his loan finished and he returned to Estudiantes.

On 15 October 2021, Vicedo signed with Fuenlabrada of the Liga ACB. In six games, he averaged three points and 1.7 rebounds per game. On 2 December, he signed with Obradoiro CAB.

On 20 July 2023, Vicedo signed with Lenovo Tenerife.

On July 23, 2025, he signed for Bàsquet Menorca of the Spanish Primera FEB.

On June 30, 2026, he signed with Río Breogán of the Spanish Liga ACB.
