= Jakov Mustapić =

Croatian basketball player

No. 9 – Igokea m:tel
- Position: Shooting guard / point guard
- League: Bosnian League; ABA League

Personal information
- Born: 22 August 1994 (age 32) Zagreb, Croatia
- Listed height: 6 ft 4 in (1.93 m)

Career information
- NBA draft: 2016: undrafted
- Playing career: 2011–present

Career history
- 2011–2014: Cibona
- 2012–2013: → Zabok
- 2013–2014: → Kvarner 2010
- 2014–2015: Split
- 2015–2016: Jolly JBŠ
- 2016–2017: Vrijednosnice Osijek
- 2017–2018: Miasto Szkła Krosno
- 2018: Vrijednosnice Osijek
- 2018–2019: Cedevita
- 2019–2020: Wilki Morskie Szczecin
- 2020: Igokea
- 2020–2021: Sloboda Tuzla
- 2021–2022: Cibona
- 2022: Spars Ilidža
- 2022–2023: Cedevita Junior
- 2023–2024: Cibona
- 2024–2025: CS Dinamo București
- 2025–present: Igokea

Career highlights
- Croatian Cup winner (2019)
Medals
Men's basketball
Representing Croatia
European U-18 Championship
Gold medal – first place	2012 Latvia/Lithuania	U-18 Team

Jakov Mustapić (born August 22, 1994) is a Croatian professional basketball player for Igokea m:tel of the Bosnian League and the ABA League. Standing at 1.93 m, he plays at the guard positions.

== Professional career ==
Mustapić played for the youth system of his hometown club Cedevita. He started his professional career in the same club, but was loaned twice: once to Zabok and once to Kvarner 2010. After the second loan his contract with Cedevita was terminated and he spent the next three seasons playing in the Croatian League for Split, Jolly and Vrijednosnice Osijek. The 2017–18 season he spent for the first time abroad in Miasto Szkła Krosno of the Polish League.

In October 2018, he returned to Vrijednosnice Osijek, but spent only a month there before returning to his youth club Cedevita.

On June 21, 2019, he has signed a deal with Wilki Morskie Szczecin of the Polish League.

In February, 2020, Mustapić signed with Igokea of the Bosnian League and the ABA League.

In March, 2021, Mustapić signed for Cibona of the Croatian League and ABA League. He averaged 5.1 points and 3.3 rebounds per game. On February 1, 2022, Mustapić signed with Spars Ilidža of the Championship of Bosnia and Herzegovina and the Second ABA League.

In August 2022, Mustapić signed for Cedevita Junior of the Croatian League.

== Personal life ==
He is the son of Ivan Mustapić, Croatian record-holding javelin thrower and the nephew of Tihomir Mustapić, a basketball player, but also a javelin thrower that holds the second-best Croatian result. Tihomir went on to be an assistant coach at Zrinjski Mostar. His other uncle is Dragan Mustapić, a former discus thrower.
