= Gonzalo Torres =

Argentine footballer (born 1999)

Personal information
- Full name: Cristian Gonzalo Torres
- Date of birth: 24 December 1999 (age 26)
- Place of birth: Morón, Argentina
- Height: 1.78 m (5 ft 10 in)
- Position: Winger

Youth career
- All Boys
- 2019–2020: Lanús

Senior career*
| Years | Team | Apps | (Gls) |
| 2020–2024 | Lanús | 6 | (0) |
| 2021 | → Defensores (loan) | 17 | (0) |
| 2022–2023 | → Central Córdoba SdE (loan) | 37 | (3) |
| 2024 | → Athens Kallithea (loan) | 14 | (3) |
| 2024 | → Godoy Cruz (loan) | 3 | (0) |
| 2025 | Deportivo Madryn | 12 | (0) |
- * Club domestic league appearances and goals as of 17:51, 23 May 2025 (UTC)

Cristian Gonzalo Torres (born 24 December 1999) is an Argentine professional footballer who plays as a winger for.

== Career ==
Torres came through the youth system at All Boys. He terminated his contract with them in August 2019 after paying $10,000 for his pass, with the winger soon joining Lanús on a free transfer. After a season in their academy, Torres made the move into their first-team squad in November 2020 by making his senior debut in the Copa de la Liga Profesional away to Boca Juniors on 20 November; after replacing Lautaro Acosta after seventy-nine minutes of a 2–1 win at La Bombonera. He made six, three as a starter, further appearances, which included a Copa Sudamericana bow against Bolívar on 2 December.

In February 2021, Torres was loaned to Primera Nacional side Defensores de Belgrano until the end of the year. He debuted in a 4–2 win over Almirante Brown in the Copa Argentina on 19 February. In June 2022, Torres completed a move to Central Córdoba SdE. In January 2024, Torres joined Athens Kallithea FC on loan from Lanús.

On 30 July 2024, Torres joined Godoy Cruz on an 18-month loan, with an option to buy.

In January 2025, Torres joined Primera Nacional side Deportivo Madryn permanently.

== Career statistics ==
As of 24 February 2021.

Appearances and goals by club, season and competition
| Club | Season | League | | | Cup | | League Cup | | Continental | | Other | | Total | |
| Club | Season | Division | Apps | Goals | Apps | Goals | Apps | Goals | Apps | Goals | Apps | Goals | Apps | Goals |
|---|---|---|---|---|---|---|---|---|---|---|---|---|---|---|
| Lanús | 2020–21 (Note: Soccerway counts 2020 Copa de la Liga Profesional appearances as league appearances.) | Primera División | 6 | 0 | 0 | 0 | 0 | 0 | 1 (Note: Appearance(s) in the Copa Sudamericana) | 0 | 0 | 0 | 7 | 0 |
| Lanús | 2021 (Note: Soccerway counts 2021 Copa de la Liga Profesional appearances as league appearances.) | Primera División | 0 | 0 | 0 | 0 | — | | 0 | 0 | 0 | 0 | 0 | 0 |
| Lanús | Total | | 6 | 0 | 0 | 0 | 0 | 0 | 1 | 0 | 0 | 0 | 7 | 0 |
| Defensores de Belgrano (loan) | 2021 | Primera Nacional | 0 | 0 | 1 | 0 | — | | — | | 0 | 0 | 1 | 0 |
| Career total | | | 6 | 0 | 1 | 0 | 0 | 0 | 1 | 0 | 0 | 0 | 8 | 0 |
