= Saleh Foroutan =

Iranian professional basketball player

Saleh Foroutan Nik
No. 5 – Petrochimi Bandar Imam
- Positions: Power forward Center
- League: Iranian League

Personal information
- Born: May 22, 1994 (age 32) Mashhad, Iran
- Listed height: 6 ft 8 3/4 in (2.05 m)
- Listed weight: 235 lb (107 kg)

Career information
- Playing career: 2010–present

Career history
- 2010–present: Petrochimi

Saleh Foroutan
Medal record

Men's basketball

Representing Iran

Asian Cup
Gold medal – first place	2012 Tokyo	Team

Asian Under-18 Championship
Bronze medal – third place	2012 Mongolia	Team

Saleh Foroutan Nik (Persian: صالح فروتن‌نیک; born May 22, 1994) is an Iranian professional basketball player. He currently plays for Petrochimi Bandar Imam in the Iranian Super League as well as for the Iranian national basketball team, as a power forward and center. He is 6'8" in height.

== 2012 FIBA Asia Cup ==
Foroutan invited to Iran national team attending the fourth FIBA Asia Cup (2012), when he was just 17 years old. Iran finally won the tournament and Foroutan enjoyed playing aside Iranian big stars like Nikkhah Bahrami, Afagh and Sahakian. "Even practicing with senior players has been a great experience." Foroutan said.

== Personal life ==
On 7 January 2026, Foroutan publicly supported the 2025–2026 Iranian protests on his Instagram, stating: "You have a shotgun in your hand, you show no mercy to the young or old. Do you want nuclear energy for peaceful purposes?"
