= Jokūbas Gintvainis =

Lithuanian basketball player (born 1994)

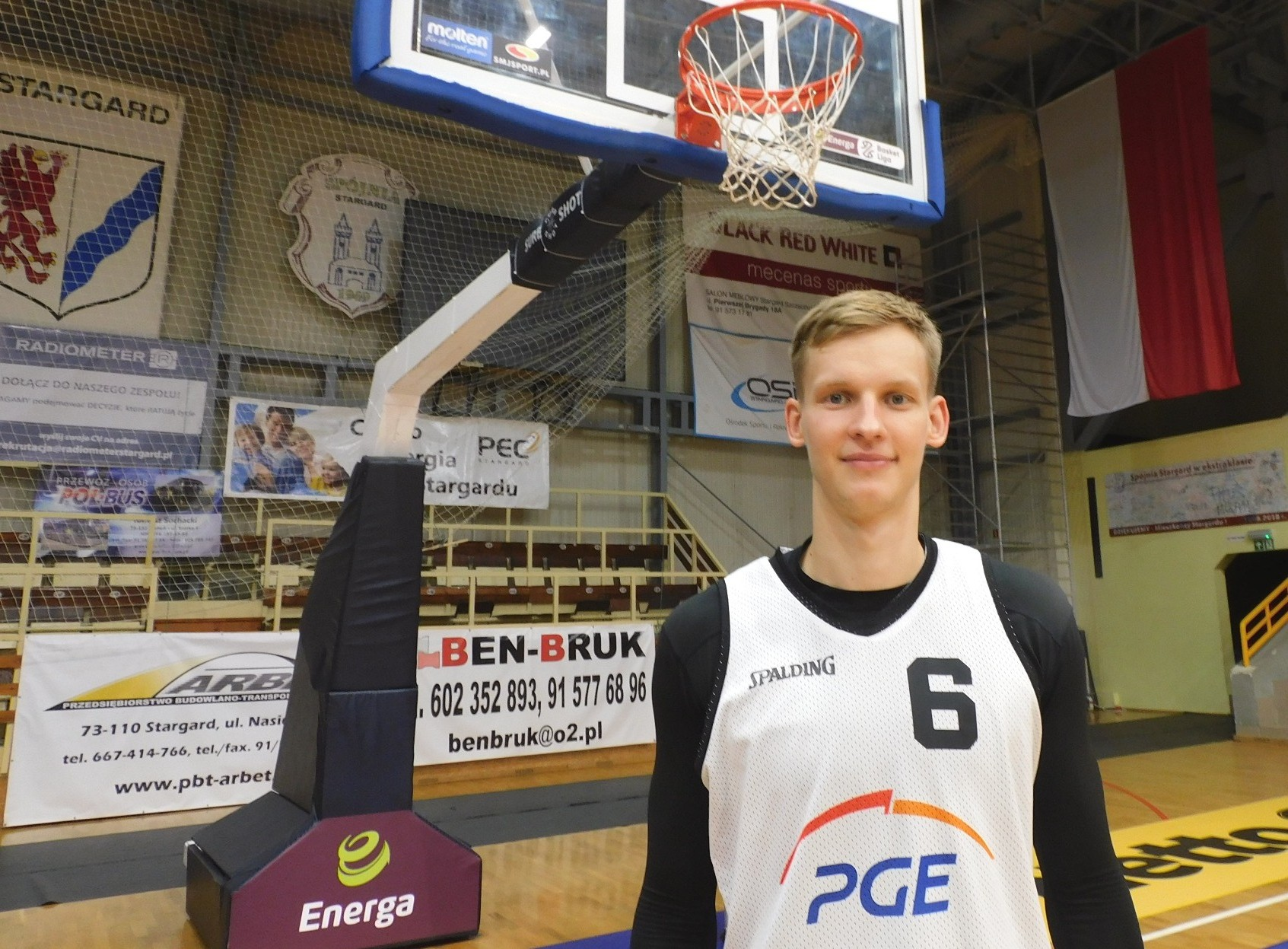

Personal information
- Born: 25 July 1994 (age 32) Plungė, Lithuania
- Listed height: 191 cm (6.27 ft)
- Listed weight: 80 kg (180 lb)

Career information
- Playing career: 2010–2021
- Position: Point guard / shooting guard

Career history
- 2010–2013: Sakalai Vilnius
- 2013–2014: Lietkabelis Panevėžys
- 2014: Science City Jena
- 2015–2016: Pieno žvaigždės Pasvalys
- 2016–2018: Peñas Huesca
- 2018–2019: Baxi Manresa
- 2019–2020: Spójnia Stargard
- 2020: Lietkabelis Panevėžys
- 2020–2021: Nevėžis Kėdaniai
Medals
Men's basketball
Representing Lithuania
FIBA World Under-19 Championship
Bronze medal – third place	2013 Czech Republic	U-19 Team
FIBA Europe Under-18 Championship
Silver medal – second place	2012 Latvia/Lithuania	U-18 Team
FIBA Europe Under-16 Championship
Silver medal – second place	2010 Montenegro	U-16 Team

Jokūbas Gintvainis (born 25 July 1994) is a former professional Lithuanian basketball player. He played the point guard and shooting guard positions.

== International career ==
Gintvainis won silver medal while representing the Lithuanian U-16 National Team during the 2010 FIBA Europe Under-16 Championship.
