= Vahid Dalirzahan =

Iranian basketball player

Personal information
- Born: 28 March 1995 (age 31) Mashhad, Iran
- Listed height: 6 ft 6 in (1.98 m)
- Position: Small forward

Career history
- 2012–2013: Azad University
- 2013–2014: Afra Khalij Fars
- 2014–2015: Mahram
- 2015–2017: Niroo Zamini Army
- 2017–2018: Mahram
- 2018–2020: Chemidor Qom
- 2020–2021: Zob Ahan
- 2021–2022: Naft Abadan
Medals
Men's basketball
Representing Iran
Asian Games
Silver medal – second place	2018 Jakarta	Team
FIBA Asia Cup
Silver medal – second place	2017 Lebanon

Vahid Dalirzahan (born 28 March 1995) is an Iranian basketball player for Army and the Iranian national team.

He participated at the 2017 FIBA Asia Cup.
