= 2013 FIBA Asia Championship squads =

These are the team rosters of the 15 teams competing in the 2013 FIBA Asia Championship.

== Group A ==
=== Chinese Taipei ===
Head coach: Hsu Chin-tse

#	Pos	Name	Club	Date of birth	Height
4	C	Tseng Wen-ting	(China) Shanghai Sharks	6 July 1984 (aged 29)	2.02 m (6 ft 7 1/2 in)
5	C	Quincy Davis	(Chinese Taipei) Pure-Youth Construction	16 February 1983 (aged 30)	2.03 m (6 ft 8 in)
6	G	Lee Hsueh-lin	(China) Beijing Ducks	31 January 1984 (aged 29)	1.75 m (5 ft 9 in)
7	F	Tien Lei	(Chinese Taipei) Dacin Tigers	1 June 1983 (aged 30)	2.02 m (6 ft 7 1/2 in)
8	G	Chen Shih-chieh	(Chinese Taipei) Pure-Youth Construction	24 September 1984 (aged 28)	1.75 m (5 ft 9 in)
9	G	Hung Chih-shan	(China) Dongguan Leopards	5 July 1985 (aged 28)	1.76 m (5 ft 9 1/2 in)
10	F	Chou Po-chen	(Chinese Taipei) Yulon Luxgen	8 August 1990 (aged 22)	1.97 m (6 ft 5 1/2 in)
11	G	Yang Chin-min	(China) Shanxi Zhongyu	22 January 1984 (aged 29)	1.88 m (6 ft 2 in)
12	F	Lin Chih-chieh	(China) Zhejiang Lions	11 June 1982 (aged 31)	1.92 m (6 ft 3 1/2 in)
13	F	Lu Cheng-ju	(Chinese Taipei) Yulon Luxgen	13 April 1986 (aged 27)	1.94 m (6 ft 4 1/2 in)
14	F	Tsai Wen-cheng	(Chinese Taipei) Pure-Youth Construction	31 May 1985 (aged 28)	1.90 m (6 ft 3 in)
15	F	Douglas Creighton	(Chinese Taipei) Pure-Youth Construction	7 March 1985 (aged 28)	1.97 m (6 ft 5 1/2 in)

=== Jordan ===
Head coach: (Greece) Vangelis Alexandris

#	Pos	Name	Club	Date of birth	Height
4	G	Fadel Al-Najjar	(Jordan) Al-Ittihad	2 April 1985 (aged 28)	1.92 m (6 ft 3 1/2 in)
5	C	Ahmad Al-Dwairi	(Jordan) Aramex	4 March 1993 (aged 20)	2.10 m (6 ft 10 1/2 in)
6	G	Hani Al-Faraj	(Jordan) Al-Ittihad	7 June 1987 (aged 26)	1.95 m (6 ft 5 in)
7	F	Ahmad Al-Hamarsheh	(Jordan) Applied Science University	10 October 1986 (aged 26)	1.96 m (6 ft 5 in)
8	G	Jimmy Baxter	(Venezuela) Guaiqueríes de Margarita	30 November 1980 (aged 32)	1.98 m (6 ft 6 in)
9	F	Khaldoon Abu Ruqayah	(Jordan) Al-Ittihad	1 April 1983 (aged 30)	2.03 m (6 ft 8 in)
10	F	Abdalla Abuqoura	(Jordan) Applied Science University	30 May 1984 (aged 29)	2.02 m (6 ft 7 1/2 in)
11	G	Wesam Al-Sous	(Jordan) Applied Science University	24 February 1983 (aged 30)	1.83 m (6 ft 0 in)
12	G	Mahmoud Abdeen	(Jordan) Al-Ittihad	23 December 1987 (aged 25)	1.87 m (6 ft 1 1/2 in)
13	C	Mohammad Shaher	(Jordan) Applied Science University	3 March 1990 (aged 23)	2.05 m (6 ft 8 1/2 in)
14	F	Mohammad Hadrab	(Jordan) Applied Science University	6 November 1984 (aged 28)	2.01 m (6 ft 7 in)
15	C	Ali Jamal Zaghab	(Jordan) Aramex	3 June 1988 (aged 25)	2.03 m (6 ft 8 in)

=== Philippines ===
Head coach: Chot Reyes

#	Pos	Name	Club	Date of birth	Height
4	G	Jimmy Alapag	(Philippines) Talk 'N Text Tropang Texters	30 December 1977 (aged 35)	1.75 m (5 ft 9 in)
5	G	LA Tenorio	(Philippines) Barangay Ginebra San Miguel	9 July 1984 (aged 29)	1.75 m (5 ft 9 in)
6	G	Jeffrei Chan	(Philippines) Rain or Shine Elasto Painters	11 February 1983 (aged 30)	1.88 m (6 ft 2 in)
7	G	Jayson William	(Philippines) Talk 'N Text Tropang Texters	30 June 1986 (aged 27)	1.78 m (5 ft 10 in)
8	G	Gary David	(Philippines) GlobalPort Batang Pier	13 July 1978 (aged 35)	1.88 m (6 ft 2 in)
9	F	Ranidel de Ocampo	(Philippines) Talk 'N Text Tropang Texters	8 December 1981 (aged 31)	1.98 m (6 ft 6 in)
10	G	Gabe Norwood	(Philippines) Rain or Shine Elasto Painters	9 February 1985 (aged 28)	1.98 m (6 ft 6 in)
11	C	Marcus Douthit	(Philippines) Smart Gilas	15 April 1980 (aged 33)	2.11 m (6 ft 11 in)
12	G	Larry Fonacier	(Philippines) Talk 'N Text Tropang Texters	13 May 1982 (aged 31)	1.88 m (6 ft 2 in)
13	C	June Mar Fajardo	(Philippines) Petron Blaze Boosters	17 November 1989 (aged 23)	2.08 m (6 ft 10 in)
14	F	Japeth Aguilar	(Philippines) GlobalPort Batang Pier	25 January 1987 (aged 26)	2.08 m (6 ft 10 in)
15	F	Marc Pingris	(Philippines) San Mig Coffee Mixers	16 October 1981 (aged 31)	1.98 m (6 ft 6 in)

=== Saudi Arabia ===
Head coach: (Serbia) Nenad Krdžić

#	Pos	Name	Club	Date of birth	Height
4	C	Mohammed Al-Marwani	(Saudi Arabia) Al-Ittihad	24 July 1989 (aged 24)	2.06 m (6 ft 9 in)
5	G	Marzouq Al-Muwallad	(Saudi Arabia) Al-Ansar	6 August 1992 (aged 20)	1.80 m (5 ft 11 in)
6	G	Mohammed Al-Sager	(Saudi Arabia) Al-Fateh	19 October 1985 (aged 27)	1.75 m (5 ft 9 in)
7	G	Jaber Al-Kaabi	(Saudi Arabia) Al-Ittihad	3 September 1986 (aged 26)	1.84 m (6 ft 1/2 in)
8	G	Fahad Al-Salik	(Saudi Arabia) Ohud	30 April 1991 (aged 22)	1.82 m (5 ft 11 1/2 in)
9	F	Mustafa Al-Hawsawi	(Saudi Arabia) Al-Ansar	4 April 1983 (aged 30)	1.93 m (6 ft 4 in)
10	G	Mohammed Abujabal	(Saudi Arabia) Ohud	7 May 1986 (aged 27)	1.84 m (6 ft 1/2 in)
11	G	Turki Al-Muhanna	(Saudi Arabia) Al-Fateh	11 March 1988 (aged 25)	1.82 m (5 ft 11 1/2 in)
12	F	Mathna Al-Marwani	(Saudi Arabia) Al-Ittihad	1 January 1992 (aged 21)	1.88 m (6 ft 2 in)
13	F	Ahmed Al-Mukhtar	(Saudi Arabia) Ohud	19 February 1993 (aged 20)	1.92 m (6 ft 3 1/2 in)
14	C	Ayman Al-Muwallad	(Saudi Arabia) Al-Ansar	1 April 1988 (aged 25)	1.89 m (6 ft 2 1/2 in)
15	F	Nassir Abo-Jalas	(Saudi Arabia) Ohud	11 June 1994 (aged 19)	1.89 m (6 ft 2 1/2 in)

== Group B ==
=== Hong Kong ===
Head coach: Wai Cheung Kwong

#	Pos	Name	Club	Date of birth	Height
4	G	Lam Man Chun	(Hong Kong) UAT	14 October 1987 (aged 25)	1.84 m (6 ft 1/2 in)
5	G	Lau Tsz Lai	(Hong Kong) UAT	4 November 1990 (aged 22)	1.84 m (6 ft 1/2 in)
6	G	Lee Ki	(Hong Kong) Winling	16 October 1987 (aged 25)	1.76 m (5 ft 9 1/2 in)
7	G	Li Kim Wong	(Hong Kong) South China	31 January 1984 (aged 29)	1.84 m (6 ft 1/2 in)
8	G	Chan Siu Wing	(Hong Kong) Winling	26 April 1992 (aged 21)	1.80 m (5 ft 11 in)
9	C	Lau Tung Leung	(Hong Kong) South China	8 October 1988 (aged 24)	2.08 m (6 ft 10 in)
10	F	Chan Yik Lun	(Hong Kong) South China	15 August 1987 (aged 25)	1.90 m (6 ft 3 in)
11	G	Poon Chi Ho	(Hong Kong) Winling	26 May 1981 (aged 32)	1.82 m (5 ft 11 1/2 in)
12	F	Fong Shing Yee	(Hong Kong) Winling	12 December 1983 (aged 29)	1.91 m (6 ft 3 in)
13	F	Wong Chun Wai	(Hong Kong) Winling	16 June 1985 (aged 28)	1.96 m (6 ft 5 in)
14	C	Duncan Reid	(Hong Kong) South China	28 September 1989 (aged 23)	2.04 m (6 ft 8 1/2 in)
15	C	Szeto Wai Kit	(Hong Kong) Fukien	6 August 1987 (aged 25)	1.95 m (6 ft 5 in)

=== Japan ===
Head coach: Kimikazu Suzuki

#	Pos	Name	Club	Date of birth	Height
4	G	Keijuro Matsui	(Japan) Toyota Alvark	16 October 1985 (aged 27)	1.88 m (6 ft 2 in)
5	G	Daiki Tanaka	(Japan) Tokai University	3 September 1991 (aged 21)	1.91 m (6 ft 3 in)
6	G	Makoto Hiejima	(Japan) Aisin Seahorses	11 August 1990 (aged 22)	1.90 m (6 ft 3 in)
7	C	Atsuya Ota	(Japan) Hamamatsu Phoenix	4 June 1984 (aged 29)	2.06 m (6 ft 9 in)
8	F	Yuta Watanabe	(Japan) Jinsei Gakuen High School	13 October 1994 (aged 18)	2.01 m (6 ft 7 in)
9	F	Takahiro Kurihara	(Japan) Toshiba Brave Thunders	6 November 1987 (aged 25)	1.92 m (6 ft 3 1/2 in)
10	F	Kosuke Takeuchi	(Japan) Toyota Alvark	29 January 1985 (aged 28)	2.05 m (6 ft 8 1/2 in)
11	G	Ryota Sakurai	(Japan) Levanga Hokkaido	13 March 1983 (aged 30)	1.94 m (6 ft 4 1/2 in)
12	C	J. R. Sakuragi	(Japan) Aisin Seahorses	30 October 1976 (aged 36)	2.03 m (6 ft 8 in)
13	G	Naoto Tsuji	(Japan) Toshiba Brave Thunders	8 September 1989 (aged 23)	1.85 m (6 ft 1 in)
14	G	Kosuke Kanamaru	(Japan) Panasonic Trians Osaka	8 March 1989 (aged 24)	1.93 m (6 ft 4 in)
15	F	Sean Hinkley	(Japan) Toyota Alvark	3 April 1991 (aged 22)	2.00 m (6 ft 6 1/2 in)

=== Qatar ===
Head coach: (United States) Tom Wisman

#	Pos	Name	Club	Date of birth	Height
4	G	Mansour El-Hadary	(Qatar) Al-Arabi	12 April 1990 (aged 23)	1.78 m (5 ft 10 in)
5	F	Jarvis Hayes	(Israel) Ironi Ashkelon	9 August 1981 (aged 31)	2.03 m (6 ft 8 in)
6	G	Saad Abdulrahman	(Qatar) Al-Sadd	2 May 1985 (aged 28)	1.93 m (6 ft 4 in)
7	G	Daoud Musa	(Qatar) Al-Sadd	2 February 1982 (aged 31)	1.94 m (6 ft 4 1/2 in)
8	F	Khalid Suliman	(Qatar) Al-Sadd	7 February 1987 (aged 26)	1.98 m (6 ft 6 in)
9	F	Ali Turki	(Qatar) Al-Jaish	10 January 1982 (aged 31)	2.00 m (6 ft 6 1/2 in)
10	F	Yasseen Ismail	(Qatar) Al-Rayyan	12 August 1980 (aged 32)	2.03 m (6 ft 8 in)
11	F	Erfan Ali	(Qatar) Al-Rayyan	20 December 1983 (aged 29)	1.98 m (6 ft 6 in)
12	C	Mohammed Saleem	(Qatar) Al-Rayyan	17 July 1982 (aged 31)	2.01 m (6 ft 7 in)
13	C	Mohammed Yousuf	(Qatar) Al-Jaish	9 September 1982 (aged 30)	2.05 m (6 ft 8 1/2 in)
14	G	Malek Saleem	(Qatar) Al-Rayyan	13 May 1985 (aged 28)	1.95 m (6 ft 5 in)
15	F	Baker Ahmad	(Qatar) Al-Jaish	11 August 1986 (aged 26)	2.01 m (6 ft 7 in)

== Group C ==
=== China ===
Head coach: (Greece) Panagiotis Giannakis

#	Pos	Name	Club	Date of birth	Height
4	G	Guo Ailun	(China) Liaoning Dinosaurs	14 November 1993 (aged 19)	1.92 m (6 ft 3 1/2 in)
5	G	Liu Xiaoyu	(China) Guangdong Southern Tigers	14 March 1989 (aged 24)	1.91 m (6 ft 3 in)
6	G	Chen Jianghua	(China) Guangdong Southern Tigers	12 March 1989 (aged 24)	1.88 m (6 ft 2 in)
7	G	Wang Shipeng	(China) Guangdong Southern Tigers	6 April 1983 (aged 30)	1.98 m (6 ft 6 in)
8	F	Zhu Fangyu	(China) Guangdong Southern Tigers	5 January 1983 (aged 30)	2.01 m (6 ft 7 in)
9	G	Sun Yue	(China) Beijing Olympians	6 November 1985 (aged 27)	2.06 m (6 ft 9 in)
10	F	Li Xiaoxu	(China) Liaoning Dinosaurs	5 June 1990 (aged 23)	2.07 m (6 ft 9 1/2 in)
11	F	Yi Jianlian	(China) Guangdong Southern Tigers	27 October 1987 (aged 25)	2.13 m (7 ft 0 in)
12	G	Zhang Bo	(China) Bayi Rockets	30 September 1990 (aged 22)	1.98 m (6 ft 6 in)
13	C	Wang Zhelin	(China) Fujian Xunxing	20 January 1994 (aged 19)	2.13 m (7 ft 0 in)
14	C	Wang Zhizhi	(China) Bayi Rockets	8 July 1977 (aged 36)	2.16 m (7 ft 1 in)
15	F	Zhou Peng	(China) Guangdong Southern Tigers	11 October 1989 (aged 23)	2.06 m (6 ft 9 in)

=== Iran ===
Head coach: (Slovenia) Memi Bečirovič

#	Pos	Name	Club	Date of birth	Height
4	F	Mohammad Jamshidi	(Iran) Azad University Tehran	30 July 1991 (aged 22)	1.98 m (6 ft 6 in)
5	G	Aren Davoudi	(Iran) Hamyari Shahrdari Zanjan	12 July 1986 (aged 27)	1.80 m (5 ft 11 in)
6	G	Javad Davari	(Iran) Foolad Mahan Isfahan	25 April 1983 (aged 30)	1.86 m (6 ft 1 in)
7	G	Mehdi Kamrani	(Iran) Mahram Tehran	1 June 1982 (aged 31)	1.80 m (5 ft 11 in)
8	G	Saman Veisi	(Iran) Foolad Mahan Isfahan	7 August 1982 (aged 30)	1.91 m (6 ft 3 in)
9	F	Oshin Sahakian	(Iran) Foolad Mahan Isfahan	21 March 1986 (aged 27)	2.01 m (6 ft 7 in)
10	G	Hamed Afagh	(Iran) Petrochimi Bandar Imam	1 February 1983 (aged 30)	1.94 m (6 ft 4 1/2 in)
11	F	Hamed Sohrabnejad	(Iran) Petrochimi Bandar Imam	7 May 1983 (aged 30)	2.06 m (6 ft 9 in)
12	C	Asghar Kardoust	(Iran) Foolad Mahan Isfahan	21 March 1986 (aged 27)	2.12 m (6 ft 11 1/2 in)
13	C	Rouzbeh Arghavan	(Iran) Petrochimi Bandar Imam	18 May 1988 (aged 25)	2.14 m (7 ft 1/2 in)
14	F	Samad Nikkhah Bahrami	(Iran) Mahram Tehran	11 May 1983 (aged 30)	1.98 m (6 ft 6 in)
15	C	Hamed Haddadi	(United States) Phoenix Suns	19 May 1985 (aged 28)	2.18 m (7 ft 2 in)

=== South Korea ===
Head coach: Yoo Jae-hak

#	Pos	Name	Club	Date of birth	Height
4	G	Kim Min-goo	(South Korea) Kyung Hee University	24 June 1991 (aged 22)	1.89 m (6 ft 2 1/2 in)
5	G	Kim Sun-hyung	(South Korea) Seoul SK Knights	1 July 1988 (aged 25)	1.87 m (6 ft 1 1/2 in)
6	G	Yang Dong-geun	(South Korea) Ulsan Mobis Phoebus	14 September 1981 (aged 31)	1.83 m (6 ft 0 in)
7	G	Kim Tae-sul	(South Korea) Anyang KGC	13 August 1984 (aged 28)	1.80 m (5 ft 11 in)
8	F	Moon Seong-gon	(South Korea) Korea University	9 May 1993 (aged 20)	1.94 m (6 ft 4 1/2 in)
9	F	Yun Ho-young	(South Korea) Wonju Dongbu Promy	1 June 1984 (aged 29)	1.97 m (6 ft 5 1/2 in)
10	F	Cho Sung-min	(South Korea) Busan KT Sonicboom	23 December 1983 (aged 29)	1.89 m (6 ft 2 1/2 in)
11	C	Kim Joo-sung	(South Korea) Wonju Dongbu Promy	9 November 1979 (aged 33)	2.05 m (6 ft 8 1/2 in)
12	C	Kim Jong-kyu	(South Korea) Kyung Hee University	3 July 1991 (aged 22)	2.07 m (6 ft 9 1/2 in)
13	F	Choi Jun-yong	(South Korea) Yonsei University	4 April 1994 (aged 19)	2.00 m (6 ft 6 1/2 in)
14	F	Lee Seung-jun	(South Korea) Wonju Dongbu Promy	18 March 1978 (aged 35)	2.04 m (6 ft 8 1/2 in)
15	C	Lee Jong-hyun	(South Korea) Anyang KGC	5 February 1994 (aged 19)	2.06 m (6 ft 9 in)

=== Malaysia ===
Head coach: Teh Choon Yean

#	Pos	Name	Club	Date of birth	Height
4	G	Soo Eng Heng	(Malaysia) Johor Tigers	4 April 1984 (aged 29)	1.83 m (6 ft 0 in)
5	G	Ng Sing Tee	(Malaysia) Sarawak Fire Horse	21 October 1989 (aged 23)	1.81 m (5 ft 11 1/2 in)
6	G	Wong Wee Seng	(Malaysia) Westports Dragons	21 November 1988 (aged 24)	1.83 m (6 ft 0 in)
7	F	Choo Wei Hong	(Malaysia) Westports Dragons	20 June 1992 (aged 21)	1.96 m (6 ft 5 in)
8	F	Ooi Ban Sin	(Malaysia) Westports Dragons	29 October 1983 (aged 29)	1.80 m (5 ft 11 in)
9	G	Tong Wen Keong	(Malaysia) Perak Farmcochem	10 September 1992 (aged 20)	1.78 m (5 ft 10 in)
10	G	Gan Hong Hoong	(Malaysia) Perak Farmcochem	4 June 1990 (aged 23)	1.87 m (6 ft 1 1/2 in)
11	C	Kuek Tian Yuan	(Malaysia) Westports Dragons	3 August 1991 (aged 21)	2.00 m (6 ft 6 1/2 in)
13	F	Wong Ching Yong	(Malaysia) Perak Farmcochem	10 March 1988 (aged 25)	1.92 m (6 ft 3 1/2 in)
14	F	Mak Lok Seng	(Malaysia) Crouching Tigers	25 September 1994 (aged 18)	1.94 m (6 ft 4 1/2 in)
15	C	Foong Min Joe	(Malaysia) Penang Stallions	23 June 1988 (aged 25)	1.97 m (6 ft 5 1/2 in)

== Group D ==
=== Bahrain ===
Head coach: (Serbia) Saša Nikitović

#	Pos	Name	Club	Date of birth	Height
4	G	Mohamed Hussain	(Bahrain) Al-Manama	10 February 1987 (aged 26)	1.87 m (6 ft 1 1/2 in)
5	G	Hussain Shaker Al-Tawash	(Bahrain) Al-Ahli	4 July 1986 (aged 27)	1.74 m (5 ft 8 1/2 in)
6	G	Mohamed Kuwaid	(Bahrain) Sitra	14 November 1989 (aged 23)	1.83 m (6 ft 0 in)
7	F	Bader Malabes	(Bahrain) Al-Muharraq	11 August 1987 (aged 25)	1.90 m (6 ft 3 in)
8	G	Ahmed Abdulaziz	(Bahrain) Al-Manama	19 October 1990 (aged 22)	1.80 m (5 ft 11 in)
9	F	Mohamed Al-Derazi	(Bahrain) Al-Muharraq	27 July 1980 (aged 33)	1.94 m (6 ft 4 1/2 in)
10	G	Ahmed Hassan	(Bahrain) Al-Muharraq	19 May 1988 (aged 25)	1.78 m (5 ft 10 in)
11	F	Sabah Hussain	(Bahrain) Al-Ahli	31 October 1988 (aged 24)	1.94 m (6 ft 4 1/2 in)
12	C	C. J. Giles	(Bahrain) Al-Muharraq	23 September 1985 (aged 27)	2.11 m (6 ft 11 in)
13	G	Yunes Kuwaid	(Bahrain) Sitra	27 May 1988 (aged 25)	1.82 m (5 ft 11 1/2 in)
14	C	Ahmed Najaf	(Bahrain) Al-Manama	28 September 1987 (aged 25)	2.02 m (6 ft 7 1/2 in)
15	F	Ahmed Malallah	(Bahrain) Al-Muharraq	3 July 1971 (aged 42)	1.88 m (6 ft 2 in)

=== India ===
Head coach: (United States) Scott Flemming

#	Pos	Name	Club	Date of birth	Height
4	G	Sambhaji Kadam	(India) Services	15 March 1980 (aged 33)	1.76 m (5 ft 9 1/2 in)
5	G	Narender Grewal	(India) Services	25 June 1988 (aged 25)	1.84 m (6 ft 1/2 in)
6	F	Pratham Singh	(India) Tamil Nadu	10 January 1991 (aged 22)	1.82 m (5 ft 11 1/2 in)
7	F	Vinay Kaushik	(India) Delhi	30 August 1991 (aged 21)	1.89 m (6 ft 2 1/2 in)
8	F	Arjun Singh	(India) Indian Railways	8 June 1992 (aged 21)	1.82 m (5 ft 11 1/2 in)
9	F	Vishesh Bhriguvanshi	(India) Indian Railways	13 September 1991 (aged 21)	1.92 m (6 ft 3 1/2 in)
10	C	Amritpal Singh	(India) Punjab Police	5 January 1991 (aged 22)	2.08 m (6 ft 10 in)
11	G	Joginder Singh	(India) Services	27 May 1988 (aged 25)	1.75 m (5 ft 9 in)
12	C	Satnam Singh Bhamara	(United States) IMG Academy	10 December 1995 (aged 17)	2.18 m (7 ft 2 in)
13	C	Amjyot Singh	(India) Tamil Nadu	27 January 1992 (aged 21)	2.03 m (6 ft 8 in)
14	F	Yadwinder Singh	(India) Uttarakhand	30 December 1986 (aged 26)	1.98 m (6 ft 6 in)
15	C	Rikin Pethani	(India) Tamil Nadu	2 December 1990 (aged 22)	2.03 m (6 ft 8 in)

=== Kazakhstan ===
Head coach: (Italy) Matteo Boniciolli

#	Pos	Name	Club	Date of birth	Height
4	G	Timur Sultanov	(Kazakhstan) BK Tobol	11 January 1981 (aged 32)	1.75 m (5 ft 9 in)
5	G	Jerry Johnson	(Kazakhstan) BK Astana	23 April 1982 (aged 31)	1.83 m (6 ft 0 in)
6	G	Rustam Murzagaliyev	(Kazakhstan) BK Astana	24 May 1992 (aged 21)	1.83 m (6 ft 0 in)
7	C	Mikhail Yevstigneyev	(Kazakhstan) Barsy Atyrau	5 July 1984 (aged 29)	1.98 m (6 ft 6 in)
8	F	Vitaliy Lapchenko	(Kazakhstan) Kaspiy Aktau	27 August 1992 (aged 20)	2.00 m (6 ft 6 1/2 in)
9	F	Nikolay Bazhin	(Kazakhstan) BK Astana	9 December 1990 (aged 22)	1.95 m (6 ft 5 in)
10	G	Konstantin Dvirniy	(Kazakhstan) BK Tobol	19 May 1988 (aged 25)	1.83 m (6 ft 0 in)
11	C	Anton Ponomarev	(Kazakhstan) BK Astana	31 October 1988 (aged 24)	2.07 m (6 ft 9 1/2 in)
12	F	Dmitriy Klimov	(Kazakhstan) BK Astana	5 September 1988 (aged 24)	1.98 m (6 ft 6 in)
13	F	Rustam Yargaliyev	(Kazakhstan) BK Astana	20 December 1986 (aged 26)	1.94 m (6 ft 4 1/2 in)
14	F	Leonid Bondarovich	(Kazakhstan) Barsy Atyrau	11 April 1989 (aged 24)	2.00 m (6 ft 6 1/2 in)
15	C	Alexandr Zhigulin	(Spain) Regal FC Barcelona B	26 April 1994 (aged 19)	2.02 m (6 ft 7 1/2 in)

=== Thailand ===
Thailand National Basketball Team roster
Players
Coaches

Pos.	No.	Name	Age – Date of birth	Height	Club	Ctr.
F	4	Chanachon Klahan	29 – 3 February 1984	1.88 m (6 ft 2 in)	Thailand Slammers	(Thailand)
F/C	5	Attaporn Lertmalaiporn	30 – 2 May 1983	1.93 m (6 ft 4 in)	Thailand Slammers	(Thailand)
G	6	Suttisin Wattana	28 – 23 January 1985	1.83 m (6 ft 0 in)	Thailand Slammers	(Thailand)
F	7	Danai Kongkum	28 – 25 January 1985	1.93 m (6 ft 4 in)	Thailand Slammers	(Thailand)
C	8	Wutipong Dasom	22 – 20 January 1991	1.96 m (6 ft 5 in)	Thailand Slammers	(Thailand)
C	9	Anasawee Klaewnarong	19 – 22 November 1993	1.99 m (6 ft 6 in)
G	10	Darongpan Apiromvilaichai	28 – 4 March 1985	1.85 m (6 ft 1 in)	Thailand Slammers	(Thailand)
G	11	Darunpong Apiromvilaichai	28 – 4 March 1985	1.85 m (6 ft 1 in)	Bangkok Cobras	(Thailand)
F/C	12	Sukhdave Ghogar	23 – 1 August 1990	1.95 m (6 ft 5 in)	Thailand Slammers	(Thailand)
G	13	Kannawat Lertlaokul	26 – 29 June 1987	1.70 m (5 ft 7 in)	Thailand Slammers	(Thailand)
G	14	Kannut Samerjai	24 – 17 October 1988	1.80 m (5 ft 11 in)	Thailand Slammers	(Thailand)
F	15	Wacharapong Tongsri	28 – 12 February 1985	1.78 m (5 ft 10 in)	Thailand Slammers	(Thailand)

Head coach

- (Thailand) Manid Niyomyinde

Assistant coach

- (Thailand) Jakravarn Booranajan

Legend

- (C) Team captain
- Club field describes current pro club
