= 2022 FIBA Asia Cup squads =

The lists below were the official squads that competed at the 2022 FIBA Asia Cup.

== Group A ==
=== Australia ===
The following was the Australia squad at the 2022 FIBA Asia Cup.

Australia men's national basketball team – 2022 FIBA Asia Cup roster
Players
Coaches

Pos.	No.	Name	Age – Date of birth	Height	Club	Ctr.
SG	4	Alex Ducas	21 – 11 December 2000	1.99 m (6 ft 6 in)	Saint Mary's Gaels	(United States)
PG	5	Tyrese Proctor	18 – 1 April 2004	1.93 m (6 ft 4 in)	Duke Blue Devils	(United States)
F	6	Wani Swaka Lo Buluk	21 – 9 June 2001	1.95 m (6 ft 5 in)	Illawarra Hawks	(Australia)
C	7	Thon Maker	25 – 25 February 1997	2.16 m (7 ft 1 in)	Long Island Nets	(United States)
PG	9	Will McDowell-White	24 – 13 April 1998	1.90 m (6 ft 3 in)	New Zealand Breakers	(New Zealand)
SG	10	Mitch McCarron	30 – 30 June 1992	1.89 m (6 ft 2 in)	Adelaide 36ers	(Australia)
C	13	Sam Froling	22 – 10 February 2000	2.12 m (6 ft 11 in)	Illawarra Hawks	(Australia)
PF	14	David Okwera	19 – 31 July 2002	2.03 m (6 ft 8 in)	Melbourne United	(Australia)
PF	23	Keanu Pinder	27 – 28 May 1995	2.03 m (6 ft 8 in)	Cairns Taipans	(Australia)
PF	25	Rhys Vague	26 – 17 January 1996	2.06 m (6 ft 9 in)	Kagawa Five Arrows	(Japan)
G/F	30	Sam McDaniel	26 – 9 December 1995	1.90 m (6 ft 3 in)	Tasmania JackJumpers	(Australia)
SF	35	Clint Steindl	33 – 15 March 1989	2.00 m (6 ft 7 in)	Tasmania JackJumpers	(Australia)

Head coach

- (Australia) Mike Kelly

Assistant coach(es)

- (Australia) Brad Davidson
- (Australia) Kerry Williams

Legend

- (C) Team captain
- (NP) Naturalized player
- Club – describes last
  club before the tournament
- Age – describes age
  on 12 July 2022

=== Indonesia ===
The following was the Indonesia squad at the 2022 FIBA Asia Cup.

Indonesia men's national basketball team – 2022 FIBA Asia Cup roster
Players
Coaches

Pos.	No.	Name	Age – Date of birth	Height	Club	Ctr.
PF	0	Juan Laurent	26 – 15 July 1995	1.91 m (6 ft 3 in)	Satria Muda Pertamina	(Indonesia)
PF	1	Derrick Michael Xzavierro	19 – 1 April 2003	2.03 m (6 ft 8 in)	Grand Canyon Antelopes	(United States)
SF	3	Brandon Jawato	29 – 3 June 1993	1.93 m (6 ft 4 in)	Utsunomiya Brex	(Japan)
SG	4	Abraham Damar Grahita	26 – 8 October 1995	1.80 m (5 ft 11 in)	Prawira Bandung	(Indonesia)
PG	7	Andakara Prastawa	29 – 16 August 1992	1.73 m (5 ft 8 in)	Pelita Jaya	(Indonesia)
PG	11	Yudha Saputera	23 – 21 November 1998	1.76 m (5 ft 9 in)	Prawira Bandung	(Indonesia)
SG	12	Muhamad Arighi	23 – 12 February 1999	1.82 m (6 ft 0 in)	Pelita Jaya	(Indonesia)
C	15	Vincent Rivaldi Kosasih	26 – 17 June 1996	2.03 m (6 ft 8 in)	Pelita Jaya	(Indonesia)
C	22	Marques Bolden (NP)	24 – 17 April 1998	2.08 m (6 ft 10 in)	Salt Lake City Stars	(United States)
SG	24	Agassi Goantara	22 – 17 October 1999	1.87 m (6 ft 2 in)	Pelita Jaya	(Indonesia)
SF	33	Arki Dikania Wisnu	34 – 15 March 1988	1.87 m (6 ft 2 in)	Satria Muda Pertamina	(Indonesia)
PG	71	Widyanta Putra Teja	25 – 13 April 1997	1.87 m (6 ft 2 in)	West Bandits Solo	(Indonesia)

Head coach

- (Serbia) Miloš Pejić

Assistant coach(es)

- (Indonesia) Johannis Winar
- (Indonesia) Wahyu Widayat Jati

Legend

- (C) Team captain
- (NP) Naturalized player
- Club – describes last
  club before the tournament
- Age – describes age
  on 12 July 2022

=== Jordan ===
The following was the Jordan squad at the 2022 FIBA Asia Cup.

Jordan men's national basketball team – 2022 FIBA Asia Cup roster
Players
Coaches

Pos.	No.	Name	Age – Date of birth	Height	Club	Ctr.
G	1	Amin Abu Hawwas	28 – 26 April 1994	1.94 m (6 ft 4 in)	Orthodox	(Jordan)
SG	2	Dar Tucker (NP)	34 – 11 April 1988	1.90 m (6 ft 3 in)	Flamengo	(Brazil)
PG	5	Freddy Ibrahim	25 – 14 October 1996	1.90 m (6 ft 3 in)	Al-Ahli	(Saudi Arabia)
G	6	Ashraf Alhendi	27 – 2 March 1995	1.90 m (6 ft 3 in)	Al-Wehdat	(Jordan)
F	7	Ahmad Alhamarsheh	35 – 10 October 1986	1.96 m (6 ft 5 in)	Al-Ahli	(Jordan)
SG	9	Sami Bzai	28 – 26 January 1994	1.90 m (6 ft 3 in)	Al-Ansar	(Jordan)
C	12	Yousef Abuwazaneh	28 – 6 December 1993	2.00 m (6 ft 7 in)	Al-Wehdat	(Jordan)
C	13	Mohammad Husein	32 – 3 March 1990	2.12 m (6 ft 11 in)	Al-Wehdat	(Jordan)
PF	15	Zaid Abbas	38 – 21 November 1983	2.03 m (6 ft 8 in)	Orthodox	(Jordan)
SF	21	Hashem Abbaas	23 – 30 March 1999	1.95 m (6 ft 5 in)	Al-Ahli	(Saudi Arabia)
PG	22	Malek Kanaan	29 – 7 February 1993	1.82 m (6 ft 0 in)	Orthodox	(Jordan)
C	44	Ahmad Al-Dwairi	29 – 4 March 1993	2.10 m (6 ft 11 in)	Bursaspor	(Turkey)

Head coach

- (Jordan) Wesam Al-Sous

Assistant coach(es)

- (Jordan) Mohammad Hadrab
- (Jordan) Abdallah Abuqoura

Legend

- (C) Team captain
- (NP) Naturalized player
- Club – describes last
  club before the tournament
- Age – describes age
  on 12 July 2022

=== Saudi Arabia ===
The following was the Saudi Arabia squad at the 2022 FIBA Asia Cup.

Saudi Arabia men's national basketball team – 2022 FIBA Asia Cup roster
Players
Coaches

Pos.	No.	Name	Age – Date of birth	Height	Club	Ctr.
G	2	Ayman Al-Muwallad	34 – 1 April 1988	1.89 m (6 ft 2 in)	Free agent
C	4	Mohammed Al-Marwani	32 – 24 July 1989	2.06 m (6 ft 9 in)	Al-Wehda	(Saudi Arabia)
PG	5	Marzouq Al-Muwallad	29 – 6 August 1992	1.83 m (6 ft 0 in)	Al-Ahli	(Saudi Arabia)
SG	6	Mathna Al-Marwani	30 – 1 January 1992	1.92 m (6 ft 4 in)	Al-Ittihad	(Saudi Arabia)
PG	7	Mohammed Alsager	36 – 19 October 1985	1.82 m (6 ft 0 in)	Al-Fateh	(Saudi Arabia)
SG	8	Fahad Belal	31 – 30 April 1991	1.86 m (6 ft 1 in)	Ohud	(Saudi Arabia)
G	10	Khalid Abdel Gabar	31 – 4 December 1990	1.83 m (6 ft 0 in)	Al-Hilal	(Saudi Arabia)
PF	14	Ayoub Alhawsawi	33 – 19 March 1989	1.88 m (6 ft 2 in)	Al-Nassr	(Saudi Arabia)
PF	15	Nassir Abo-Jalas	28 – 11 June 1994	1.96 m (6 ft 5 in)	Ohud	(Saudi Arabia)
SG	20	Ali Shubayli	26 – 18 January 1996	1.90 m (6 ft 3 in)	Al-Ahli	(Saudi Arabia)
F	35	Thamer Mohammed	25 – 19 May 1997	1.95 m (6 ft 5 in)	Al-Wehda	(Saudi Arabia)
F	99	Musab Kadi	22 – 11 August 1999	1.96 m (6 ft 5 in)	Al-Nassr	(Saudi Arabia)

Head coach

- (Egypt) Mohamed El-Kerdany

Assistant coach(es)

- (Armenia) Krikor Krikorian

Legend

- (C) Team captain
- (NP) Naturalized player
- Club – describes last
  club before the tournament
- Age – describes age
  on 12 July 2022

== Group B ==
=== Bahrain ===
The following was the Bahrain squad at the 2022 FIBA Asia Cup.

Bahrain men's national basketball team – 2022 FIBA Asia Cup roster
Players
Coaches

Pos.	No.	Name	Age – Date of birth	Height	Club	Ctr.
C	2	Wayne Chism (NP)	35 – 16 June 1987	2.06 m (6 ft 9 in)	Al-Wehda	(Saudi Arabia)
G	5	Husain Altawash	36 – 4 July 1986	1.74 m (5 ft 9 in)	Al-Muharraq	(Bahrain)
SG	6	Ali Rashed	21 – 6 September 2000	1.81 m (5 ft 11 in)	Al-Manama	(Bahrain)
PG	7	Maitham Isa	31 – 23 September 1990	1.83 m (6 ft 0 in)	Al-Ahli	(Bahrain)
PG	11	Mustafa Rashed	20 – 4 January 2002	1.77 m (5 ft 10 in)	Al-Manama	(Bahrain)
PF	12	Ahmed Akber	31 – 21 February 1991	1.99 m (6 ft 6 in)	Al-Manama	(Bahrain)
C	15	Nader Naser	22 – 27 June 2000	2.00 m (6 ft 7 in)	Free agent
SG	17	Ali Kadhem	21 – 24 October 2000	1.85 m (6 ft 1 in)	Al-Manama	(Bahrain)
PF	23	Mohammed Hamooda	27 – 15 January 1995	1.98 m (6 ft 6 in)	Al-Manama	(Bahrain)
F	34	Ali Hasan	28 – 29 June 1994	1.94 m (6 ft 4 in)	Al-Muharraq	(Bahrain)
PG	55	Ahmed Al Derazi	31 – 9 October 1990	1.72 m (5 ft 8 in)	Al-Ahli	(Bahrain)
PG	77	Ahmed Bindayneh	20 – 30 January 2002	1.79 m (5 ft 10 in)	Al-Muharraq	(Bahrain)

Head coach

- (Lithuania) Mindaugas Lukošius

Assistant coach(es)

- (Tunisia) Racem Marzougui

Legend

- (C) Team captain
- (NP) Naturalized player
- Club – describes last
  club before the tournament
- Age – describes age
  on 12 July 2022

=== China ===
The following was the China squad at the 2022 FIBA Asia Cup.

China men's national basketball team – 2022 FIBA Asia Cup roster
Players
Coaches

Pos.	No.	Name	Age – Date of birth	Height	Club	Ctr.
G	7	Sun Minghui	26 – 26 April 1996	1.88 m (6 ft 2 in)	Beijing Ducks	(China)
SG	8	Zhao Rui	26 – 14 January 1996	1.95 m (6 ft 5 in)	Guangdong Southern Tigers	(China)
SF	9	Zhai Xiaochuan	29 – 24 March 1993	2.05 m (6 ft 9 in)	Beijing Ducks	(China)
SF	12	Gu Quan	30 – 2 April 1992	2.01 m (6 ft 7 in)	Shenzhen Leopards	(China)
C	14	Wang Zhelin	28 – 20 January 1994	2.13 m (7 ft 0 in)	Shanghai Sharks	(China)
F/C	15	Zhou Qi	26 – 16 January 1996	2.12 m (6 ft 11 in)	Shenzhen Leopards	(China)
C	17	Fan Ziming	24 – 29 April 1998	2.10 m (6 ft 11 in)	Beijing Ducks	(China)
PG	23	Hu Mingxuan	24 – 10 March 1998	1.93 m (6 ft 4 in)	Guangdong Southern Tigers	(China)
SG	25	He Xining	25 – 22 January 1997	1.93 m (6 ft 4 in)	Shenzhen Leopards	(China)
C	27	Fu Hao	24 – 24 August 1997	2.08 m (6 ft 10 in)	Liaoning Flying Leopards	(China)
PG	29	Jiang Weize	22 – 6 May 2000	1.82 m (6 ft 0 in)	Jilin Northeast Tigers	(China)
PG	30	Xu Jie	22 – 16 January 2000	1.80 m (5 ft 11 in)	Guangdong Southern Tigers	(China)

Head coach

- (China) Du Feng

Assistant coach(es)

- (Argentina) Silvio Santander
- (China) Yang Wenhai
- (China) Zhang Boyu

Legend

- (C) Team captain
- (NP) Naturalized player
- Club – describes last
  club before the tournament
- Age – describes age
  on 12 July 2022

=== Chinese Taipei ===
The following was the Chinese Taipei squad at the 2022 FIBA Asia Cup.

Chinese Taipei men's national basketball team – 2022 FIBA Asia Cup roster
Players
Coaches

Pos.	No.	Name	Age – Date of birth	Height	Club	Ctr.
SG	0	Lin Chien-ting	22 – 31 October 1999	1.90 m (6 ft 3 in)	Tianjin Pioneers	(China)
PG	2	Lin Chun-chi	24 – 29 January 1998	1.75 m (5 ft 9 in)	Formosa Taishin Dreamers	(Chinese Taipei)
SF	5	Liu Cheng	31 – 24 November 1990	1.92 m (6 ft 4 in)	Shanghai Sharks	(China)
PG	6	Lee Kai-yan	29 – 6 May 1993	1.82 m (6 ft 0 in)	New Taipei Kings	(Chinese Taipei)
PG	9	Chen Ying-chun	29 – 9 June 1993	1.81 m (5 ft 11 in)	Guangzhou Loong Lions	(China)
SG	11	Huang Tsung-han	28 – 7 July 1994	1.93 m (6 ft 4 in)	TaiwanBeer HeroBears	(Chinese Taipei)
PF	15	Chen Kuan-chuan	28 – 30 December 1993	1.95 m (6 ft 5 in)	Taoyuan Pilots	(Chinese Taipei)
F/C	17	Su Shih-hsuan	26 – 9 April 1996	1.97 m (6 ft 6 in)	Bank of Taiwan	(Chinese Taipei)
PF	20	Chou Po-hsun	31 – 6 March 1991	1.97 m (6 ft 6 in)	TaiwanBeer HeroBears	(Chinese Taipei)
SG	21	Chien You-che	26 – 10 September 1995	1.80 m (5 ft 11 in)	New Taipei Kings	(Chinese Taipei)
SF	22	Huang Hung-han	27 – 15 October 1994	1.92 m (6 ft 4 in)	Taoyuan Pilots	(Chinese Taipei)
C	31	Will Artino (NP)	30 – 27 June 1992	2.11 m (6 ft 11 in)	Tainan TSG GhostHawks	(Chinese Taipei)

Head coach

- (United States) Charles Parker

Assistant coach(es)

- (Chinese Taipei) Sang Mao-sen
- (Chinese Taipei) Yang Che-yi

Legend

- (C) Team captain
- (NP) Naturalized player
- Club – describes last
  club before the tournament
- Age – describes age
  on 12 July 2022

=== South Korea ===
The following was the South Korea squad at the 2022 FIBA Asia Cup.

South Korea men's national basketball team – 2022 FIBA Asia Cup roster
Players
Coaches

Pos.	No.	Name	Age – Date of birth	Height	Club	Ctr.
SG	1	Choi Jun-yong	28 – 4 April 1994	2.00 m (6 ft 7 in)	Seoul SK Knights	(South Korea)
PG	2	Heo Hoon	26 – 16 August 1995	1.81 m (5 ft 11 in)	Suwon KT Sonicboom	(South Korea)
PG	3	Heo Ung	28 – 5 August 1993	1.86 m (6 ft 1 in)	Wonju DB Promy	(South Korea)
SG	7	Lee Woosuk	23 – 10 July 1999	1.96 m (6 ft 5 in)	Ulsan Mobis Phoebus	(South Korea)
SF	11	Yang Hong-seok	25 – 2 July 1997	1.99 m (6 ft 6 in)	Suwon KT Sonicboom	(South Korea)
C	15	Kim Jong-kyu	31 – 3 July 1991	2.07 m (6 ft 9 in)	Wonju DB Promy	(South Korea)
C	20	Ra Gun-ah (NP)	33 – 20 February 1989	2.03 m (6 ft 8 in)	Busan KCC Egis	(South Korea)
F	21	Lee Dae-heon	30 – 29 April 1992	1.97 m (6 ft 6 in)	Daegu KOGAS Pegasus	(South Korea)
PF	26	Kang Sang-jae	27 – 31 December 1994	2.02 m (6 ft 8 in)	Wonju DB Promy	(South Korea)
C	31	Jang Jae-seok	31 – 3 February 1991	2.05 m (6 ft 9 in)	Ulsan Mobis Phoebus	(South Korea)
G	43	Lee Dae-sung	32 – 30 May 1990	1.90 m (6 ft 3 in)	Goyang Sono Skygunners	(South Korea)
PF	55	Song Kyo-chang	26 – 3 July 1996	2.00 m (6 ft 7 in)	Busan KCC Egis	(South Korea)

Head coach

- (South Korea) Choo Il-seung

Assistant coach(es)

- (South Korea) Lee Hoon-jae

Legend

- (C) Team captain
- (NP) Naturalized player
- Club – describes last
  club before the tournament
- Age – describes age
  on 12 July 2022

== Group C ==
=== Iran ===
The following was the Iran squad at the 2022 FIBA Asia Cup.

Iran men's national basketball team – 2022 FIBA Asia Cup roster
Players
Coaches

Pos.	No.	Name	Age – Date of birth	Height	Club	Ctr.
SG	1	Rasoul Mozafari	27 – 22 July 1994	1.89 m (6 ft 2 in)	Gorgan	(Iran)
PG	5	Sajjad Mashayekhi	28 – 23 February 1994	1.80 m (5 ft 11 in)	Zob Ahan	(Iran)
PF	7	Mohammad Hassanzadeh	31 – 6 October 1990	2.03 m (6 ft 8 in)	Mahram	(Iran)
SG	8	Behnam Yakhchali	27 – 12 July 1995	1.91 m (6 ft 3 in)	Mitteldeutscher BC	(Germany)
C	10	Mohammad Yousofvand	26 – 1 March 1996	2.07 m (6 ft 9 in)	Chemidor	(Iran)
PF	12	Arman Zangeneh	29 – 15 June 1993	2.05 m (6 ft 9 in)	Zob Ahan	(Iran)
G/F	13	Mohammad Jamshidi	30 – 30 July 1991	1.85 m (6 ft 1 in)	Gorgan	(Iran)
PF	14	Arsalan Kazemi	32 – 22 April 1990	2.01 m (6 ft 7 in)	Zob Ahan	(Iran)
C	15	Hamed Haddadi	37 – 19 May 1985	2.18 m (7 ft 2 in)	Sichuan Blue Whales	(China)
SF	17	Navid Rezaeifar	25 – 23 August 1996	1.93 m (6 ft 4 in)	Chemidor	(Iran)
PG	23	Sajjad Pazrofteh	25 – 21 December 1996	1.88 m (6 ft 2 in)	Gorgan	(Iran)
F	71	Matin Aghajanpour	21 – 14 March 2001	1.98 m (6 ft 6 in)	Kouchin Amol	(Iran)

Head coach

- (Iran) Saeed Armaghani

Assistant coach(es)

- (Iran) Mohammad Kasaeepour
- (Iran) Mehrad Atashi

Legend

- (C) Team captain
- (NP) Naturalized player
- Club – describes last
  club before the tournament
- Age – describes age
  on 12 July 2022

=== Japan ===
The following was the Japan squad at the 2022 FIBA Asia Cup.

Japan men's national basketball team – 2022 FIBA Asia Cup roster
Players
Coaches

Pos.	No.	Name	Age – Date of birth	Height	Club	Ctr.
PG	2	Yuki Togashi	28 – 30 July 1993	1.67 m (5 ft 6 in)	Chiba Jets Funabashi	(Japan)
C	3	Luke Evans (NP)	31 – 16 March 1991	2.03 m (6 ft 8 in)	Fighting Eagles Nagoya	(Japan)
F	12	Yuta Watanabe	27 – 13 October 1994	2.06 m (6 ft 9 in)	Toronto Raptors	(Canada)
SF	16	Takuma Sato	27 – 10 May 1995	1.78 m (5 ft 10 in)	Chiba Jets Funabashi	(Japan)
SG	17	Yutaroh Suda	30 – 3 January 1992	1.90 m (6 ft 3 in)	Nagoya Diamond Dolphins	(Japan)
SG	19	Yudai Nishida	23 – 13 March 1999	1.90 m (6 ft 3 in)	SeaHorses Mikawa	(Japan)
PG	33	Yuki Kawamura	21 – 2 May 2001	1.72 m (5 ft 8 in)	Yokohama B-Corsairs	(Japan)
SG	39	Keisei Tominaga	21 – 1 February 2001	1.88 m (6 ft 2 in)	Nebraska Cornhuskers	(United States)
PG	45	Kai Toews	23 – 17 September 1998	1.88 m (6 ft 2 in)	Shiga Lakes	(Japan)
C	71	Soichiro Inoue	23 – 7 May 1999	2.01 m (6 ft 7 in)	Sun Rockers Shibuya	(Japan)
SF	88	Tenketsu Harimoto	30 – 8 January 1992	1.98 m (6 ft 6 in)	Nagoya Diamond Dolphins	(Japan)
G/F	91	Hirotaka Yoshii	24 – 4 June 1998	1.96 m (6 ft 5 in)	Alvark Tokyo	(Japan)

Head coach

- (United States) Tom Hovasse

Assistant coach(es)

- (United States) Corey Gaines
- (Japan) Geoffrey Katsuhisa

Legend

- (C) Team captain
- (NP) Naturalized player
- Club – describes last
  club before the tournament
- Age – describes age
  on 12 July 2022

=== Kazakhstan ===
The following was the Kazakhstan squad at the 2022 FIBA Asia Cup.

Kazakhstan men's national basketball team – 2022 FIBA Asia Cup roster
Players
Coaches

Pos.	No.	Name	Age – Date of birth	Height	Club	Ctr.
PG	6	Shaim Kuanov	30 – 28 July 1991	1.81 m (5 ft 11 in)	Tobol	(Kazakhstan)
F	7	Nikolay Bazhin	31 – 9 December 1990	1.95 m (6 ft 5 in)	Barsy Atyrau	(Kazakhstan)
C	8	Vladimir Ivanov	27 – 30 November 1994	2.08 m (6 ft 10 in)	Barsy Atyrau	(Kazakhstan)
SG	9	Vadim Chsherbak	29 – 24 May 1993	1.98 m (6 ft 6 in)	Astana	(Kazakhstan)
PG	10	Rustam Murzagaliev	30 – 24 May 1992	1.92 m (6 ft 4 in)	Astana	(Kazakhstan)
C	11	Anton Bykov	33 – 18 April 1989	1.98 m (6 ft 6 in)	Tobol	(Kazakhstan)
PF	21	Roman Marchuk	29 – 4 March 1993	1.98 m (6 ft 6 in)	Barsy Atyrau	(Kazakhstan)
C	23	Robert Pan	27 – 18 April 1995	2.02 m (6 ft 8 in)	Astana	(Kazakhstan)
C	24	Dmitriy Gavrilov	35 – 27 November 1986	2.04 m (6 ft 8 in)	Astana	(Kazakhstan)
SG	25	Maxim Marchuk	28 – 17 January 1994	1.96 m (6 ft 5 in)	Astana	(Kazakhstan)
SF	47	Ruslan Aitkali	24 – 19 December 1997	2.02 m (6 ft 8 in)	Astana	(Kazakhstan)
PG	99	Oleg Balashov	23 – 7 May 1999	1.85 m (6 ft 1 in)	Astana	(Kazakhstan)

Head coach

- (Russia) Oleg Kiselev

Assistant coach(es)

- (Kazakhstan) Alexandr Lyssyak

Legend

- (C) Team captain
- (NP) Naturalized player
- Club – describes last
  club before the tournament
- Age – describes age
  on 12 July 2022

=== Syria ===
The following was the Syria squad at the 2022 FIBA Asia Cup.

Syria men's national basketball team – 2022 FIBA Asia Cup roster
Players
Coaches

Pos.	No.	Name	Age – Date of birth	Height	Club	Ctr.
SF	1	Anthouny Bakar	28 – 10 January 1994	1.98 m (6 ft 6 in)	Al-Ittihad	(Syria)
PG	2	Elias Azrie	20 – 2 January 2002	1.85 m (6 ft 1 in)	Al-Jalaa	(Syria)
PG	6	Georgi Nazarian	28 – 4 January 1994	1.89 m (6 ft 2 in)	Al-Karamah	(Syria)
G	7	Nadim Issa	32 – 21 May 1990	1.85 m (6 ft 1 in)	Al-Ittihad	(Syria)
SG	8	Magd Harbasha	32 – 21 April 1990	1.87 m (6 ft 2 in)	Al-Wahda	(Syria)
PG	9	Isshak Oubeid	27 – 22 February 1995	1.83 m (6 ft 0 in)	Al-Ittihad	(Syria)
C	12	Abdulwahab Al-Hamwi	32 – 15 June 1990	2.20 m (7 ft 3 in)	Al-Ittihad	(Iraq)
SF	14	Omar Idelbi	22 – 13 July 1999	1.94 m (6 ft 4 in)	Al-Wahda	(Syria)
C	15	Hani Adribe	31 – 4 October 1990	2.04 m (6 ft 8 in)	Al-Wahda	(Syria)
PF	21	Omar Cheikh-Ali	31 – 1 January 1991	2.04 m (6 ft 8 in)	Al-Karamah	(Syria)
F	24	Amer Alsati	30 – 5 April 1992	2.03 m (6 ft 8 in)	Al-Wahda	(Syria)
SG	88	Amir Hinton (NP)	25 – 14 February 1997	1.98 m (6 ft 6 in)	Kouvot	(Finland)

Head coach

- (Spain) Javier Juárez

Assistant coach(es)

- (Spain) Julen Forniés Martinez
- (Syria) George Shakar

Legend

- (C) Team captain
- (NP) Naturalized player
- Club – describes last
  club before the tournament
- Age – describes age
  on 12 July 2022

== Group D ==
=== India ===
The following was the India squad at the 2022 FIBA Asia Cup.

India men's national basketball team – 2022 FIBA Asia Cup roster
Players
Coaches

Pos.	No.	Name	Age – Date of birth	Height	Club	Ctr.
SG	1	Sahaij Sekhon	20 – 1 September 2001	1.94 m (6 ft 4 in)	Chandigarh BC	(India)
PG	7	Muin Bek Hafeez	26 – 16 March 1996	1.90 m (6 ft 3 in)	Indian Bank Chennai BC	(India)
G/F	9	Vishesh Bhriguvanshi	30 – 13 November 1991	1.92 m (6 ft 4 in)	Bengaluru Beast	(India)
C	10	Amritpal Singh	31 – 5 January 1991	2.16 m (7 ft 1 in)	Pune Peshwas	(India)
F	12	Amarendra Nayak	19 – 21 March 2003	1.98 m (6 ft 6 in)	Uttarakhand BC	(India)
PF	15	Prashant Singh Rawat	21 – 15 August 2000	2.02 m (6 ft 8 in)	Uttarakhand BC	(India)
PF	17	Pratyanshu Tomar	22 – 17 June 2000	2.03 m (6 ft 8 in)	Bengaluru Kings	(India)
SF	19	Pranav Prince	19 – 26 April 2003	2.00 m (6 ft 7 in)	Tamil Nadu	(India)
C	36	Aryan Arora	19 – 25 December 2002	2.18 m (7 ft 2 in)	Manhattan Jaspers	(United States)
C	70	Vivek Goti	28 – 5 July 1994	2.10 m (6 ft 11 in)	Tamil Nadu	(India)
G/F	77	Arvind Muthu	22 – 16 March 2000	1.87 m (6 ft 2 in)	Tamil Nadu	(India)
F	99	Kushal Singh	17 – 3 July 2005	1.95 m (6 ft 5 in)	Delhi Dribblers	(India)

Head coach

- (Serbia) Veselin Matić

Assistant coach(es)

- (India) Thankachan Mulackal
- (India) Santosh Somasundaram

Legend

- (C) Team captain
- (NP) Naturalized player
- Club – describes last
  club before the tournament
- Age – describes age
  on 12 July 2022

=== Lebanon ===
The following was the Lebanon squad at the 2022 FIBA Asia Cup.

Lebanon men's national basketball team – 2022 FIBA Asia Cup roster
Players
Coaches

Pos.	No.	Name	Age – Date of birth	Height	Club	Ctr.
SG	6	Elie Chamoun	27 – 21 October 1994	1.88 m (6 ft 2 in)	Beirut Club	(Lebanon)
G	7	Karim Zeinoun	23 – 16 June 1999	1.88 m (6 ft 2 in)	Al Riyadi	(Lebanon)
SG	9	Sergio El Darwich	25 – 25 July 1996	1.94 m (6 ft 4 in)	Beirut Club	(Lebanon)
PG	10	Ali Mansour	24 – 1 January 1998	1.85 m (6 ft 1 in)	Al Riyadi	(Lebanon)
C	11	Ali Haidar (C)	31 – 20 July 1990	2.06 m (6 ft 9 in)	Al Riyadi	(Lebanon)
PF	14	Karim Ezzedine	24 – 8 August 1997	2.06 m (6 ft 9 in)	Dynamo Lebanon	(Lebanon)
PG	20	Wael Arakji	27 – 4 September 1994	1.93 m (6 ft 4 in)	Al Riyadi	(Lebanon)
PF	21	Jonathan Arledge (NP)	30 – 21 September 1991	2.11 m (6 ft 11 in)	FC Porto	(Portugal)
SF	23	Youssef Khayat	19 – 11 March 2003	2.05 m (6 ft 9 in)	Limoges CSP	(France)
PF	24	Hayk Gyokchyan	32 – 11 December 1989	2.03 m (6 ft 8 in)	Beirut Club	(Lebanon)
PG	25	Ali Mezher	28 – 22 March 1994	1.83 m (6 ft 0 in)	Hoops Club	(Lebanon)
C	34	Gerard Hadidian	27 – 24 April 1995	2.02 m (6 ft 8 in)	Beirut Club	(Lebanon)

Head coach

- (Lebanon) Jad El Hajj

Assistant coach(es)

- (Serbia) Marko Filipović

Legend

- (C) Team captain
- (NP) Naturalized player
- Club – describes last
  club before the tournament
- Age – describes age
  on 12 July 2022

=== New Zealand ===
The following was the New Zealand squad at the 2022 FIBA Asia Cup.

New Zealand men's national basketball team – 2022 FIBA Asia Cup roster
Players
Coaches

Pos.	No.	Name	Age – Date of birth	Height	Club	Ctr.
F	00	Max Darling	21 – 30 September 2000	1.98 m (6 ft 6 in)	CSM Constanța	(Romania)
SF	3	Sam Mennenga	20 – 12 December 2001	2.03 m (6 ft 8 in)	Davidson Wildcats	(United States)
PG	5	Taylor Britt	25 – 22 September 1996	1.88 m (6 ft 2 in)	Canterbury Rams	(New Zealand)
SG	6	Taine Murray	20 – 19 April 2002	1.94 m (6 ft 4 in)	Virginia Cavaliers	(United States)
F	9	Kane Keil	24 – 13 July 1997	1.95 m (6 ft 5 in)	Franklin Bulls	(New Zealand)
PG	11	Flynn Cameron	22 – 30 June 2000	1.96 m (6 ft 5 in)	UC Riverside Highlanders	(United States)
SG	12	Kruz Perrott-Hunt	21 – 23 November 2000	1.98 m (6 ft 6 in)	South Dakota Coyotes	(United States)
SF	14	Isaac Davidson	25 – 22 June 1997	1.98 m (6 ft 6 in)	New Zealand Breakers	(New Zealand)
C	15	Jordan Hunt	24 – 12 September 1997	2.06 m (6 ft 9 in)	Hawke's Bay Hawks	(New Zealand)
PF	16	Tohi Smith-Milner	26 – 6 October 1995	2.05 m (6 ft 9 in)	South East Melbourne Phoenix	(Australia)
G/F	20	Taki Fahrensohn	23 – 29 January 1999	2.01 m (6 ft 7 in)	Auckland Tuatara	(New Zealand)
C	33	Sam Timmins	25 – 23 May 1997	2.11 m (6 ft 11 in)	New Zealand Breakers	(New Zealand)

Head coach

- (New Zealand) Pero Cameron

Assistant coach(es)

- (New Zealand) Ross McMains
- (New Zealand) Zico Coronel

Legend

- (C) Team captain
- (NP) Naturalized player
- Club – describes last
  club before the tournament
- Age – describes age
  on 12 July 2022

=== Philippines ===
The following was the Philippines squad at the 2022 FIBA Asia Cup.

Philippines men's national basketball team – 2022 FIBA Asia Cup roster
Players
Coaches

Pos.	No.	Name	Age – Date of birth	Height	Club	Ctr.
PG	0	Thirdy Ravena	25 – December 17, 1996	1.89 m (6 ft 2 in)	San-en NeoPhoenix	(Japan)
G	1	Bobby Ray Parks Jr.	29 – February 19, 1993	1.93 m (6 ft 4 in)	Nagoya Diamond Dolphins	(Japan)
G	3	RJ Abarrientos	22 – September 14, 1999	1.81 m (5 ft 11 in)	Far Eastern Tamaraws	(Philippines)
C	7	Poy Erram	33 – July 7, 1989	2.01 m (6 ft 7 in)	TNT Tropang Giga	(Philippines)
SF	10	Rhenz Abando	24 – March 11, 1998	1.88 m (6 ft 2 in)	Letran Knights	(Philippines)
PG	15	Kiefer Ravena	28 – October 27, 1993	1.85 m (6 ft 1 in)	Shiga Lakestars	(Japan)
PF	17	Francis Lopez	19 – May 17, 2003	1.93 m (6 ft 4 in)	Ateneo de Manila	(Philippines)
C	18	Shaun Geoffrey Chiu	21 – May 18, 2001	2.03 m (6 ft 8 in)	Ateneo Blue Eagles	(Philippines)
C	23	William Navarro	25 – February 3, 1997	1.99 m (6 ft 6 in)	Ateneo Blue Eagles	(Philippines)
G	27	SJ Belangel	23 – June 27, 1999	1.77 m (5 ft 10 in)	Ateneo Blue Eagles	(Philippines)
F	28	Kevin Quiambao	21 – April 22, 2001	1.93 m (6 ft 4 in)	De La Salle Green Archers	(Philippines)
F	33	Carl Tamayo	21 – February 13, 2001	2.01 m (6 ft 7 in)	University of the Philippines Fighting Maroons	(Philippines)

Head coach

- (Philippines) Chot Reyes

Assistant coach(es)

- (Philippines) Joshua Vincent Reyes
- (Philippines) Jem Ryn Betia

Team manager

- (Philippines) Butch Antonio

Legend

- (C) Team captain
- (NP) Naturalized player
- Club – describes last
  club before the tournament
- Age – describes age
  on July 12, 2022
