= Saudi Arabia men's national basketball team =

Saudi Arabia
- FIBA ranking: 64 ▲1 (1 September 2026)
- Joined FIBA: 1964
- FIBA zone: FIBA Asia
- National federation: Saudi Basketball Federation
- Coach: Daniel Maffei
- Nickname: Falcons

FIBA Asia Cup
- Appearances: 10
- Medals: Bronze: (1999)
Home	Away

Former logo of the Saudi Basketball Federation.jpg

The Saudi Arabia national basketball team is the national basketball team representing the Kingdom of Saudi Arabia. It is administered by the Saudi Arabian Basketball Federation. (Arabic: اتحاد المملكة العربية السعودية لكرة السلة)

Its biggest success has been the Bronze medal at the 1999 Asian Championship. The team last qualified for the 2025 FIBA Asia Cup as host.

== Competition records ==
=== Summer Olympics ===
Year	Position	Pld	W	L
(Nazi Germany) 1936	Not a IOC member			
(United Kingdom) 1948	Not a IOC member			
(Finland) 1952	Not a IOC member			
(Australia) 1956	Not a IOC member			
(Italy) 1960	Not a IOC member			
(Japan) 1964	Not a IOC member			
(Mexico) 1968	Did not enter			
(West Germany) 1972	Did not enter			
(Canada) 1976	Did not enter			
(Soviet Union) 1980	Did not enter			
(United States) 1984	Did not enter			
(South Korea) 1988	Did not enter			
(Spain) 1992	Did not qualify			
(United States) 1996	Did not qualify			
(Australia) 2000	Did not qualify			
(Greece) 2004	Did not qualify			
(China) 2008	Did not qualify			
(United Kingdom) 2012	Did not qualify			
(Brazil) 2016	Did not qualify			
(Japan) 2020	Did not qualify			
(France) 2024	Did not qualify			
(United States) 2028	To be determined			
Total	0/22	0	0	0

=== FIBA Basketball World Cup ===
Year	Position	Pld	W	L
(Argentina) 1950	Not a FIBA member			
(Brazil) 1954	Not a FIBA member			
(Chile) 1959	Not a FIBA member			
(Brazil) 1963	Not a FIBA member			
(Uruguay) 1967	Did not enter			
(Socialist Federal Republic of Yugoslavia) 1970	Did not enter			
(Puerto Rico) 1974	Did not enter			
(Philippines) 1978	Did not enter			
(Colombia) 1982	Did not enter			
(Spain) 1986	Did not enter			
(Argentina) 1990	Did not qualify			
(Canada) 1994	Did not qualify			
(Greece) 1998	Did not qualify			
(United States) 2002	Did not qualify			
(Japan) 2006	Did not qualify			
(Turkey) 2010	Did not qualify			
(Spain) 2014	Did not qualify			
(China) 2019	Did not qualify			
(Philippines) (Japan) (Indonesia) 2023	Did not qualify			
(Qatar) 2027	To be determined			
(France) 2031	To be determined			
Total	0/21	0	0	0

=== FIBA Asia Cup ===
Year	Position	Pld	W	L
(Philippines) 1960	Not a FIBA member			
(Taiwan) 1963	Not a FIBA member			
(Malaysia) 1965	did not enter			
(South Korea) 1967	did not enter			
(Thailand) 1969	did not enter			
(Japan) 1971	did not enter			
(Philippines) 1973	did not enter			
(Thailand) 1975	did not enter			
(Malaysia) 1977	did not enter			
(Japan) 1979	did not enter			
(India) 1981	did not enter			
(Hong Kong) 1983	did not enter			
(Malaysia) 1985	did not enter			
(Thailand) 1987	did not enter			
(China) 1989	7th place	7	3	4
(Japan) 1991	9th place	8	6	2
(Indonesia) 1993	6th place	7	4	3
(South Korea) 1995	6th place	8	4	4
(Saudi Arabia) 1997	4th place	7	4	3
(Japan) 1999	3rd place	8	5	3
(China) 2001	Withdrew			
(China) 2003	Withdrew			
(Qatar) 2005	8th place	8	2	6
(Japan) 2007	Withdrew			
(China) 2009	did not enter			
(China) 2011	did not qualify			
(Philippines) 2013	13th place	4	1	3
(China) 2015	did not qualify			
(Lebanon) 2017	did not qualify			
(Indonesia) 2022	14th place	3	0	3
(Saudi Arabia) 2025	10th place	4	2	2
2029	To be determined			
Total	10/31	64	31	33

=== Asian Games ===
Year	Rank	Pld	W	L
(India) 1951	Did not enter			
(Philippines) 1954	Did not enter			
(Japan) 1958	Did not enter			
(Indonesia) 1962	Did not enter			
(Thailand) 1966	Did not enter			
(Thailand) 1970	Did not enter			
(Iran) 1974	Did not enter			
(Thailand) 1978	12th place	9	2	7
(India) 1982	Did not enter			
(South Korea) 1986	Did not enter			
(China) 1990	9th place	3	1	2
(Japan) 1994	7th place	5	1	4
(Thailand) 1998	Did not enter			
(South Korea) 2002	Did not enter			
(Qatar) 2006	Did not enter			
(China) 2010	Did not enter			
(South Korea) 2014	13th place	3	2	1
(Indonesia) 2018	Did not enter			
(China) 2022	6th place	7	4	3
(Japan) 2026	8th place	4	1	3
Total	6/20	31	11	20

=== Islamic Solidarity Games ===
- 2005 – 6th
- 2013 – 5th

Beginning with the 2017 event, regular basketball was replaced by 3x3 basketball.

=== Arab Basketball Championship ===
- 1978 – (silver)
- 1997 – (gold)
- 2007 – (bronze)
- 2008 – 5th
- 2009 – 7th
- 2015 – 4th
- 2017 – 4th
- 2018 – (gold)

=== Pan Arab Games ===
- 1997 – (gold)
- 2007 – 8th
- 2011 – 11th

Beginning with the 2023 event, regular basketball was replaced by 3x3 basketball.

== Team ==
=== Current roster ===
Roster for the 2025 FIBA Asia Cup.

Saudi Arabia men's national basketball team – 2025 FIBA Asia Cup roster
Players
Coaches

Pos.	No.	Name	Age – Date of birth	Height	Club	Ctr.
PG	00	Marzouq Al-Muwallad	32 – 6 August 1992	1.83 m (6 ft 0 in)	Al-Ahli	(Saudi Arabia)
C	4	Mohammed Al-Marwani (C)	36 – 24 April 1989	2.06 m (6 ft 9 in)	Al-Ittihad	(Saudi Arabia)
SG	5	Muhammad-Ali Abdur-Rahkman (NP)	30 – 1 September 1994	1.93 m (6 ft 4 in)	Bilbao	(Spain)
F	6	Mathna Almarwani	33 – 1 January 1992	1.92 m (6 ft 4 in)	Al-Ittihad	(Saudi Arabia)
PG	7	Mohammed Alsager	39 – 19 October 1985	1.82 m (6 ft 0 in)	Al-Ula	(Saudi Arabia)
SG	8	Fahad Belal	34 – 30 April 1991	1.86 m (6 ft 1 in)	Al-Ittihad	(Saudi Arabia)
G	10	Khalid Abdel Gabar	34 – 4 December 1990	1.83 m (6 ft 0 in)	Al Hilal	(Saudi Arabia)
C	12	Mohammed Alsuwailem	27 – 2 March 1998	2.08 m (6 ft 10 in)	Al-Ula	(Saudi Arabia)
SF	20	Ali Shubayli	29 – 18 January 1996	1.90 m (6 ft 3 in)	Al-Ahli	(Saudi Arabia)
SG	24	Manaf Mustafa Alsalem	22 – 7 July 2003	1.94 m (6 ft 4 in)	Al-Khowildiah	(Saudi Arabia)
F	35	Thamer Mahmoud Mohammed	28 – 19 May 1997	1.95 m (6 ft 5 in)	Al-Ahli	(Saudi Arabia)
PF	99	Musad Tariq Kadi	25 – 11 August 1999	1.96 m (6 ft 5 in)	Al-Nassr	(Saudi Arabia)

Head coach

- (Spain) Ricard Casas

Assistant coach(es)

- (Spain) Jordi Guardia
- (Lebanon) Krikor Krikorian

Legend

- (C) Team captain
- (NP) Naturalized player
- Club – describes last
  club before the tournament
- Age – describes age
  on 5 August 2025

=== Past rosters ===
2021 FIBA Asia Cup qualification
Opposition: Qatar (20 February)
Venue: King Abdullah Sports City, Jeddah
Opposition: Syria (23 February)
Venue: King Abdullah Sports City, Jeddah

Saudi Arabia national basketball team – 2021 FIBA Asia Cup qualification roster
Players
Coaches

Pos.	No.	Name	Age – Date of birth	Height	Club	Ctr.
SG	4	Mohammed Al-Marwani	30 – 24 July 1989	1.85 m (6 ft 1 in)	Al-Ittihad BC	(Saudi Arabia)
PG	5	Marzouq Al-Muwallad	27 – 6 August 1992	1.83 m (6 ft 0 in)	Al-Ahli BC	(Saudi Arabia)
PG	6	Mathna Al-Marwani	28 – 1 January 1992	1.86 m (6 ft 1 in)	Al-Ittihad BC	(Saudi Arabia)
PG	7	Mohammed Alsager	34 – 19 October 1985	1.82 m (6 ft 0 in)	Al-Fateh BC	(Saudi Arabia)
SG	8	Fahad Belal	28 – 30 April 1991	1.86 m (6 ft 1 in)	Ohud Medina BC	(Saudi Arabia)
PG	10	Khalid Abdel Gabar	36 – 4 December 1983	1.83 m (6 ft 0 in)	Al-Nasr BC	(Saudi Arabia)
C	11	Naif Althalabi	23 – 18 May 1996	2.02 m (6 ft 8 in)	Al-Ahli BC	(Saudi Arabia)
C	12	Mohammed Alsuwailem	21 – 2 March 1998	2.08 m (6 ft 10 in)	Al-Hilal BC	(Saudi Arabia)
PF	14	Ayoub Alhawsawi	30 – 19 March 1989	1.88 m (6 ft 2 in)	Al-Nasr BC	(Saudi Arabia)
C	15	Mohammed Shbili	31 – 10 October 1988	2.02 m (6 ft 8 in)	Al-Ahli BC	(Saudi Arabia)
SG	20	Ali Shubayli	24 – 18 January 1996	1.90 m (6 ft 3 in)	Al-Ahli BC	(Saudi Arabia)
SG	25	Osama Albargawi	21 – 7 December 1998	1.88 m (6 ft 2 in)	Ohud Medina BC	(Saudi Arabia)

Head coach

- (Saudi Arabia) Ali Alsanhani

Assistant coach(es)

- (Saudi Arabia) Khaldoun Almowallad
- (Saudi Arabia) Yahya Almutawa

Legend

- (C) Team captain
- (NP) Naturalized player
- Club – describes last
  club before the tournament
- Age – describes age
  on 20 February 2020

In February 2020, at the 2021 FIBA Asia Cup qualification games, Khalid Abdel-Gabar averaged most minutes, points and assists for Saudi Arabia.

2018 FIBA Asia Cup Pre-qualifiers Squad:

Saudi Arabia men's national basketball team – 2017 Arab Nations Championship roster
Players
Coaches

Pos.	No.	Name	Age – Date of birth	Height	Club
F	15	Nassir Abojalas	22 – 11 June 1994	1.94 m (6 ft 4 in)	Uhud Medina	(Saudi Arabia)
C	4	Mohammed Al-Marwani	27 – 24 July 1989	2.04 m (6 ft 8 in)	Al-Ittihad	(Saudi Arabia)
PG	5	Marzouq Almuwallad	24 – 6 August 1992	1.82 m (6 ft 0 in)	Al-Ahli	(Saudi Arabia)
PG	6	Mohammed Fahad Alsager	31 – 19 October 1985	1.82 m (6 ft 0 in)	Al Fateh Al Hasa	(Saudi Arabia)
G	8	Fahad Belal	26 – 30 April 1991	1.88 m (6 ft 2 in)	Ohud Medina	(Saudi Arabia)
G/F	10	Osama Albargawi	–			(Saudi Arabia)
C	12	Mohammed Alsuwallem	–		Al Hilal	(Saudi Arabia)
F	13	Ahmed Almukhtar	23 – 19 February 1993	1.91 m (6 ft 3 in)	Uhud Medina	(Saudi Arabia)
C	20	Thamer Abkar	19 – 18 May 1997	2.01 m (6 ft 7 in)	Al-Ittihad
G/F	23	Mathna Almarwani	25 – 1 January 1992	1.84 m (6 ft 0 in)
	11	Mohammad Shubayli	–		Al Ahli Jeddah	(Saudi Arabia)
F	14	Ayoub Howsawi	29 – 15 October 1987	1.96 m (6 ft 5 in)	Ohud Medina	(Saudi Arabia)

Head coach

- (Saudi Arabia) Ali Alsanhani

Assistant coach(es)

- (Saudi Arabia) Khaldoun Almowallad

Legend

- (C) Team captain
- Club – describes last
  club before the tournament
- Age – describes age
  on 1 January 2017

2017 Arab Nations Basketball Championship Squad:

Saudi Arabia men's national basketball team – 2017 Arab Nations Championship roster
Players
Coaches

Pos.	No.	Name	Age – Date of birth	Height	Club
F	3	Nassir Abojalas	22 – 11 June 1994	1.94 m (6 ft 4 in)	Uhud Medina	(Saudi Arabia)
C	4	Mohammed Al-Marwani	27 – 24 July 1989	2.04 m (6 ft 8 in)	Al-Ittihad	(Saudi Arabia)
PG	5	Marzouq Almuwallad	24 – 6 August 1992	1.82 m (6 ft 0 in)	Al-Ansar	(Saudi Arabia)
PG	6	Mohammed Fahad Alsager	31 – 19 October 1985	1.82 m (6 ft 0 in)	Al Fateh Al Hasa	(Saudi Arabia)
PG	8	Fahad Belal	26 – 30 April 1991	1.88 m (6 ft 2 in)	Ohud Medina	(Saudi Arabia)
	10	Osama Albargawi	–
	12	Mohammed Alsuwallem	–		Al Hilal	(Saudi Arabia)
F	13	Ahmed Almukhtar	23 – 19 February 1993	1.91 m (6 ft 3 in)	Uhud Medina	(Saudi Arabia)
C	20	Naif Al Thalabi	20 – 18 May 1996	2.03 m (6 ft 8 in)
F/C	23	Mathna Almarwani	25 – 1 January 1992	1.84 m (6 ft 0 in)
	35	Ali Shubayli	–		Al Ahli Jeddah	(Saudi Arabia)
C	55	Hani Almohammed	27 – 15 October 1989	2.02 m (6 ft 8 in)	Al Hilal	(Saudi Arabia)

Head coach

- (Bosnia and Herzegovina) Mensur Bajramovic

Assistant coach(es)

- (Saudi Arabia) Yousef Alosaimi

Legend

- (C) Team captain
- Club – describes last
  club before the tournament
- Age – describes age
  on 1 January 2017

Pos.	Starting 5	Bench 1	Bench 2
C	Mathna Almarwani	Mohammed Al-Marwani	Naif Al Thalabi
PF	Nassir Abojalas	Hani Almohammed
SF	Ahmed Almukhtar	Mohammed Alsuwallem	Osama Albargawi
SG	Fahad Belal		Ali Shubayli
PG	Marzouq Almuwallad	Mohammed Fahad Alsager

2012 Squad:

Saudi Arabia National Basketball Team roster
Players
Coaches

Pos.	No.	Name	Age – Date of birth	Height	Club
C	4	Mohammed Al-Marwani	22 – 24 July 1989	6 ft 8 in (2.03 m)	Al Ittihad	(Saudi Arabia)
PG	5	Marzouq Al-Muwallad	19 – 6 August 1992	5 ft 11 in (1.8 m)
PG	6	Mohammed Al-Sager	26 – 10 October 1985	5 ft 11 in (1.8 m)	Al Fateh	(Saudi Arabia)
SG	7	Jaber Kabe	26 – 3 September 1985	6 ft 1 in (1.85 m)	Al Ittihad	(Saudi Arabia)
F/C	8	Ahmed Samater	31 – 13 January 1980	6 ft 6 in (1.98 m)	Al Hilal	(Saudi Arabia)
F	9	Mohammad Al-Hawify	34 – 26 December 1977	6 ft 3 in (1.91 m)	Al Ahli	(Saudi Arabia)
G	10	Faisal Al-Dawsari	21 – 19 August 1990	5 ft 11 in (1.8 m)	Al Hilal	(Saudi Arabia)
C	11	Hashem Al-Fotawi	33 – 7 September 1978	6 ft 9 in (2.06 m)	Al Ansar	(Saudi Arabia)
F	12	Fawaz Gassas	34 – 1 October 1977	6 ft 5 in (1.96 m)	Al Ahli	(Saudi Arabia)
F/C	13	Ahmed Al-Hosawi	27 – 23 June 1984	6 ft 7 in (2.01 m)	Al Ansar	(Saudi Arabia)
G	14	Fahad Belal	20 – 30 April 1991	5 ft 11 in (1.8 m)	Ohud Medina	(Saudi Arabia)
F	15	Mohammed Al-Mutairi	19 – 16 May 1992	6 ft 4 in (1.93 m)	Al Arabi	(Saudi Arabia)

Head coach

- Lofti Chikhaoui

Assistant coach(es)

- Ghassan Al-Yenbawi

Legend

- (C) Team captain
- Club field describes current pro club

2014 Asian Games Squad:

Saudi Arabia men's national basketball team – 2014 Asian Games roster
Players
Coaches

Pos.	No.	Name	Age – Date of birth	Height	Club
C	4	Mohammed Al-Marwani	25 – 24 July 1989	2.04 m (6 ft 8 in)	Al-Ittihad	(Saudi Arabia)
PF	5	Mohammed Ismail Fallatah	24 – 23 May 1990	1.98 m (6 ft 6 in)	Al Wehda Mecca	(Saudi Arabia)
PG	6	Marzouq Almuwallad	22 – 6 August 1992	1.82 m (6 ft 0 in)	Al-Ansar	(Saudi Arabia)
PG	7	Jaber Nasser Kabe	29 – 3 September 1985	1.83 m (6 ft 0 in)	Al-Ittihad	(Saudi Arabia)
SF	8	Turki Hassan Almuhanna	26 – 11 March 1988	1.81 m (5 ft 11 in)	Al Hilal Riyadh	(Saudi Arabia)
PF	9	Mustafa Alhwsawi (C)	31 – 4 May 1983	1.88 m (6 ft 2 in)	Al-Ansar	(Saudi Arabia)
C	10	Rashad Shuri	31 – 18 February 1983	1.95 m (6 ft 5 in)	Al Wehda Mecca	(Saudi Arabia)
PG	11	Mohammed Fahad Alsager	28 – 19 October 1985	1.82 m (6 ft 0 in)	Al Fateh Al Hasa	(Saudi Arabia)
C	12	Khalid Mohammed Walibi	20 – 5 October 1993	2.06 m (6 ft 9 in)	Al Hilal Riyadh	(Saudi Arabia)
SF	13	Abdullah Fahad Altaher	22 – 29 November 1991	1.80 m (5 ft 11 in)	Al Fateh Al Hasa	(Saudi Arabia)
SG	14	Ayman Almuwallad	26 – 1 April 1988	1.90 m (6 ft 3 in)	Al-Ansar
PG	15	Fahad Belal	23 – 30 April 1991	1.88 m (6 ft 2 in)	Ohud Medina	(Saudi Arabia)

Head coach

- (Saudi Arabia) Abdulrahim Lal Akhtar

Assistant coach(es)

- (Saudi Arabia) Yousef Mohammed Alosaimi
- (Saudi Arabia) Abdullah Adel Alameen

Legend

- (C) Team captain
- Club – describes last
  club before the tournament
- Age – describes age
  on 19 September 2014
- Source: incheon2014ag.org

=== Head coach position ===
- (Saudi Arabia) Lofti Chikhaoui – 2011
- (Serbia) Nenad Krdzic – 2013
- (Saudi Arabia) Abdulrahim Akhtar – 2014
- (Bosnia and Herzegovina) Mensur Bajramovic – 2017
- (Saudi Arabia) Ali Alsanhani – 2018
- (Netherlands) Johan Roijakkers – 2022–2023
- (Spain) Ricard Casas – 2025–

== See also ==
- Saudi Arabia national under-19 basketball team
- Saudi Arabia national under-17 basketball team
- Saudi Arabia national 3x3 team
- Saudi Arabia women's national basketball team
