= 2009 FIBA Asia Under-16 Championship =

2009 FIBA U16 Asia Cup
1st FIBA Under-16 Asian Basketball Championship

Tournament details
- Host country: Malaysia
- Dates: November 19–27
- Teams: 16 (from 44 federations)
- Venue: 1 (in 1 host city)

Final positions
- Champions: China (1st title)

Official website
- 2009 FIBA Asia U-16 Championship

The 2009 FIBA Asia Under-16 Championship was the qualifying tournament for FIBA Asia at the Under-17 World Championship 2010 at Hamburg, Germany. The tournament was held on Johor Bahru, Malaysia from November 19 to November 27.

== Draw ==
The draw was held on October 26, 2009.

| Group A | Group B | Group C | Group D |
|---|---|---|---|
| China; ~~Myanmar~~ * India; Jordan | Japan; Philippines; Kazakhstan; Bahrain | South Korea; Singapore; Syria; Kuwait; Malaysia * | Chinese Taipei; Thailand; Iran; Saudi Arabia * |

* Saudi Arabia withdrew from the tournament; Consequently, hosts Malaysia who were earlier drawn in Group C moved to Group D. But Saudi Arabia later decided to participate and replaced Myanmar in Group A.

== Preliminary round ==
=== Group A ===
| Team | Pld | W | L | PF | PA | PD | Pts |
|---|---|---|---|---|---|---|---|
| China | 3 | 3 | 0 | 347 | 120 | +227 | 6 |
| Jordan | 3 | 2 | 1 | 160 | 184 | −24 | 5 |
| India | 3 | 1 | 2 | 133 | 218 | −85 | 4 |
| Saudi Arabia | 3 | 0 | 3 | 105 | 223 | −118 | 3 |

November 19
11:00

Report

| China | 109–29 | Saudi Arabia |
Scoring by quarter: 23–4, 22–2, 40–7, 24–16
| Pts: Guo A.L. 20; Rebs: Zhu X.H. 11; Asts: Luo H.C. 3 | | Pts: Al-Hosawe 10; Rebs: Abo-Jalas 6 Asts: 0 |

Stadium Bandaraya, Johor Bahru

November 19
15:00

Report

| India | 31–57 | Jordan |
Scoring by quarter: 6–27, 12–10, 9–11, 4–9
| Pts: Singh 9 Rebs: Panigrahi 7 Asts: Singh 2 | | Pts: Kanaan 18; Rebs: Al-Shami 12; Asts: Kanaan 5 |

Stadium Bandaraya, Johor Bahru

November 20
8:00

| Saudi Arabia | 40–55 | India |
Scoring by quarter: 11–18, 3–13, 17–17, 9–7
| Pts: Abo-Jalas 14 | | Pts: Panigrahi 15 |

Stadium Bandaraya, Johor Bahru

November 20
22:00

Report

| Jordan | 44–117 | China |
Scoring by quarter: 10–31, 16–23, 11–40, 7–23
| Pts: Kanaan 17; Rebs: Al-Shami 4 Asts: Kanaan, Al-Abbadi 2 | | Pts: Shi H.F. 16; Rebs: Ju M.X., Wei D. 6 Asts: Wang Z.R., Guo A.L. 5 |

Stadium Bandaraya, Johor Bahru

November 21
10:00

Report

| Jordan | 59–36 | Saudi Arabia |
Scoring by quarter: 17–11, 11–6, 16–6, 15–13
| Pts: Kanaan 20; Rebs: Al-Shami 9 Asts: Kanaan 4 | | Pts: Abo-Jalas 9 Rebs: Al-Dossary 7 Asts: Abo-Jalas 2 |

Stadium Bandaraya, Johor Bahru

November 21
20:00

Report

| China | 121–47 | India |
Scoring by quarter: 23–16, 41–5, 29–12, 28–14
| Pts: Guo A.L., Zhu X.H. 23; Rebs: Zhu X.H. 11; Asts: Shi H.F., Wang Z.R. 5 | | Pts: Singh 9 Rebs: Sunny 4 Asts: Joginder, Sunder 2 |

Stadium Bandaraya, Johor Bahru

=== Group B ===
| Team | Pld | W | L | PF | PA | PD | Pts | Tiebreaker |
|---|---|---|---|---|---|---|---|---|
| Philippines | 3 | 3 | 0 | 202 | 154 | +48 | 6 | |
| Japan | 3 | 1 | 2 | 221 | 215 | +6 | 4 | 1–1 / 1.073 |
| Kazakhstan | 3 | 1 | 2 | 179 | 208 | −29 | 4 | 1–1 / 0.977 |
| Bahrain | 3 | 1 | 2 | 184 | 209 | −25 | 4 | 1–1 / 0.946 |

November 19
9:00

| Kazakhstan | 63–54 | Bahrain |
Scoring by quarter: 18–14, 14–9, 18–21, 13–10
| Pts: Zhigulin 20 | | Pts: Ali 16 |

Stadium Bandaraya, Johor Bahru

November 19
19:00

Report

| Japan | 59–64 (OT) | Philippines |
Scoring by quarter: 10–5, 13–14, 15–17, 12–14, Overtime: 9–14
| Pts: Vehara, Tawatari 15; Rebs: Hareyama 12; Asts: Tano 6 | | Pts: Ravena 25; Rebs: Javillonar 9 Asts: Ravena 2 |

Stadium Bandaraya, Johor Bahru

November 20
10:00

| Bahrain | 85–84 | Japan |
Scoring by quarter: 25–27, 10–19, 19–21, 31–16
| Pts: Ali 29 | | Pts: Tano 19 |

Stadium Bandaraya, Johor Bahru

November 20
16:00

Report

| Philippines | 76–50 | Kazakhstan |
Scoring by quarter: 16–14, 19–10, 14–13, 27–13
| Pts: Ravena 23; Rebs: Javillonar 5 Asts: Pessumal 5 | | Pts: Kurochka 16; Rebs: Zhigulin 13; Asts: Maxutov, Zhigulin 2 |

Stadium Bandaraya, Johor Bahru

November 21
8:00

Report

| Bahrain | 45–62 | Philippines |
Scoring by quarter: 19–13, 9–18, 9–13, 8–18
| Pts: Buti 15; Rebs: Hanafi 9 Asts: Mohammed, Sayed 2 | | Pts: Tolomia 27; Rebs: Romero 8 Asts: Ravena, Pessumal, Sara 3 |

Stadium Bandaraya, Johor Bahru

November 21
22:00

Report

| Japan | 78–66 | Kazakhstan |
Scoring by quarter: 20–15, 15–15, 20–12, 23–24
| Pts: Tawatari 28; Rebs: Hareyama 13; Asts: Fujii, Tano 3 | | Pts: Zhigulin 23; Rebs: Zhigulin 22; Asts: Maxutov 3 |

Stadium Bandaraya, Johor Bahru

=== Group C ===
| Team | Pld | W | L | PF | PA | PD | Pts |
|---|---|---|---|---|---|---|---|
| South Korea | 3 | 3 | 0 | 295 | 144 | +151 | 6 |
| Syria | 3 | 2 | 1 | 185 | 213 | −28 | 5 |
| Singapore | 3 | 1 | 2 | 152 | 217 | −65 | 4 |
| Kuwait | 3 | 0 | 3 | 147 | 205 | −58 | 3 |

November 19
7:00

Report

| South Korea | 101–33 | Singapore |
Scoring by quarter: 34–10, 18–10, 29–4, 20–9
| Pts: Shin H.S. 25; Rebs: Jang M.H. 7 Asts: Lee D.Y. 5 | | Pts: Low 10; Rebs: Su 7 Asts: Four players 1 |

Stadium Bandaraya, Johor Bahru

November 19
17:00

Report

| Syria | 53–52 | Kuwait |
Scoring by quarter: 11–4, 11–13, 20–17, 11–18
| Pts: Rahal 20; Rebs: Otabachi 11; Asts: Sirjieh, Trub 2 | | Pts: Shuaib 18; Rebs: Al-Shammari 14; Asts: Abu Dhom, Shuaib, Al-Bader 1 |

Stadium Bandaraya, Johor Bahru

November 20
12:00

Report

| Kuwait | 50–91 | South Korea |
Scoring by quarter: 10–27, 8–31, 19–18, 13–15
| Pts: Shuaib 16; Rebs: Al-Shammari 10; Asts: Abu Dhom 3 | | Pts: Han H.W. 17; Rebs: Lee J.H. 11; Asts: Lee D.Y. 7 |

Stadium Bandaraya, Johor Bahru

November 20
18:00

Report

| Singapore | 58–71 | Syria |
Scoring by quarter: 12–13, 10–16, 18–23, 18–19
| Pts: Liew 15; Rebs: Ng W.X. 10; Asts: Liew 3 | | Pts: Otabachi 13; Rebs: Otabachi 12; Asts: Obaysi 2 |

Stadium Bandaraya, Johor Bahru

November 21
12:00

Report

| Kuwait | 45–61 | Singapore |
Scoring by quarter: 5–12, 15–7, 13–22, 12–20
| Pts: Shuaib 21; Rebs: Al-Oun 10; Asts: Shuaib 2 | | Pts: Liew 24; Rebs: Low 14; Asts: Liew, Ng W.X. 2 |

Stadium Bandaraya, Johor Bahru

November 21
18:00

Report

| South Korea | 103–61 | Syria |
Scoring by quarter: 49–20, 14–9, 18–18, 22–14
| Pts: Shin H.S. 22; Rebs: Kim H.J. 6 Asts: Lee D.Y. 6 | | Pts: Otabachi 13; Rebs: Beirakdar 6 Asts: Sirjieh 2 |

Stadium Bandaraya, Johor Bahru

=== Group D ===
| Team | Pld | W | L | PF | PA | PD | Pts |
|---|---|---|---|---|---|---|---|
| Iran | 3 | 3 | 0 | 255 | 162 | +93 | 6 |
| Chinese Taipei | 3 | 2 | 1 | 280 | 199 | +81 | 5 |
| Malaysia | 3 | 1 | 2 | 210 | 255 | −45 | 4 |
| Thailand | 3 | 0 | 3 | 114 | 243 | −129 | 3 |

November 19
13:00

Report

| Chinese Taipei | 74–87 | Iran |
Scoring by quarter: 8–30, 15–18, 22–19, 29–20
| Pts: Chen Y.C. 26; Rebs: Chen Y.C. 5 Asts: Chen Y.C. 3 | | Pts: Yousefi 21; Rebs: Zangeneh 12; Asts: Yousefi 2 |

Stadium Bandaraya, Johor Bahru

November 19
21:15

Report

| Malaysia | 80–44 | Thailand |
Scoring by quarter: 19–8, 15–15, 16–10, 30–11
| Pts: Loh S.W. 34; Rebs: Loh S.W. 10; Asts: Ang 5 | | Pts: Kongtawee 15; Rebs: Roeakwutthipong 9 Asts: Kongsang 3 |

Stadium Bandaraya, Johor Bahru

November 20
14:00

| Thailand | 36–71 | Iran |
Scoring by quarter: 8–13, 8–13, 8–25, 12–20
| Pts: Kongsang 9 | | Pts: Mirfattahi 20 |

Stadium Bandaraya, Johor Bahru

November 20
20:00

Report

| Malaysia | 78–114 | Chinese Taipei |
Scoring by quarter: 8–28, 22–21, 22–29, 26–36
| Pts: Loh S.W. 34; Rebs: Loh S.W. 12; Asts: Chua Y.H. 4 | | Pts: Chen Y.C. 24; Rebs: Chen Y.C. 9 Asts: Chen Y.C. 8 |

Stadium Bandaraya, Johor Bahru

November 21
14:00

Report

| Chinese Taipei | 92–34 | Thailand |
Scoring by quarter: 7–16, 35–3, 17–11, 33–4
| Pts: Chen Y.C. 22; Rebs: Chen K.C. 9 Asts: Chen Y.C. 6 | | Pts: Kongtawee, Kongsang 8 Rebs: Thongkam 11; Asts: Rattanapansri 2 |

Stadium Bandaraya, Johor Bahru

November 21
16:00

Report

| Iran | 97–52 | Malaysia |
Scoring by quarter: 23–11, 29–10, 26–19, 19–12
| Pts: Mirfattahi, Yousefi 22; Rebs: Mirfattahi 18; Asts: Abedi 2 | | Pts: Ang 15; Rebs: Ang 7 Asts: Chua J.S., Ong W.Y. 2 |

Stadium Bandaraya, Johor Bahru

== Quarterfinal round ==
=== Group I ===
| Team | Pld | W | L | PF | PA | PD | Pts |
|---|---|---|---|---|---|---|---|
| China | 3 | 3 | 0 | 344 | 177 | +167 | 6 |
| South Korea | 3 | 2 | 1 | 215 | 216 | −1 | 5 |
| Chinese Taipei | 3 | 1 | 2 | 175 | 246 | −71 | 4 |
| Japan | 3 | 0 | 3 | 188 | 283 | −95 | 3 |

November 22
20:00

Report

| China | 108–61 | Chinese Taipei |
Scoring by quarter: 34–11, 26–14, 21–19, 27–17
| Pts: Guo A.L. 21; Rebs: Ju M.X. 11; Asts: Guo A.L. 5 | | Pts: Wang J.C. 25; Rebs: Kao P.Y. 7 Asts: Lin Y.H., Kao P.Y. 3 |

Stadium Bandaraya, Johor Bahru

November 22
22:00

Report

| Japan | 56–93 | South Korea |
Scoring by quarter: 11–19, 14–28, 12–19, 19–27
| Pts: Aratani 11; Rebs: Hareyama 10; Asts: Tano 4 | | Pts: Lee J.H. 21; Rebs: Lee J.H. 12; Asts: Choi C.J. 6 |

Stadium Bandaraya, Johor Bahru

November 23
16:00

Report

| South Korea | 51–121 | China |
Scoring by quarter: 14–26, 18–34, 9–36, 10–25
| Pts: Kim H.J. 11; Rebs: Kim H.J., Han H.W., Jang M.H. 4 Asts: Han S.H. 2 | | Pts: Guo A.L. 25; Rebs: Zhai X.C. 8 Asts: Four players 3 |

Stadium Bandaraya, Johor Bahru

November 23
18:00

Report

| Chinese Taipei | 75–67 | Japan |
Scoring by quarter: 23–25, 16–19, 22–16, 14–7
| Pts: Chen K.C. 18; Rebs: Chen K.C. 10; Asts: Chen Y.C. 5 | | Pts: Tawatari 28; Rebs: Hareyama 11; Asts: Fujii, Tano 4 |

Stadium Bandaraya, Johor Bahru

November 24
20:00

Report

| China | 115–65 | Japan |
Scoring by quarter: 27–28, 35–8, 22–16, 31–13
| Pts: Guo A.L. 34; Rebs: Wang Z.R. 12; Asts: Bi J.G., Luo H.C. 4 | | Pts: Tawatari 29; Rebs: Hareyama 10; Asts: Uehara 3 |

Stadium Bandaraya, Johor Bahru

November 24
22:00

Report

| South Korea | 71–39 | Chinese Taipei |
Scoring by quarter: 14–13, 17–5, 24–9, 16–12
| Pts: Choi C.J. 16; Rebs: Lee J.H. 11; Asts: Four players 2 | | Pts: Wang J.C. 13; Rebs: Yang H.C., Chen K.C. 9 Asts: Wu C.C., Kao P.Y. 2 |

Stadium Bandaraya, Johor Bahru

=== Group II ===
| Team | Pld | W | L | PF | PA | PD | Pts |
|---|---|---|---|---|---|---|---|
| Iran | 3 | 3 | 0 | 215 | 179 | +36 | 6 |
| Philippines | 3 | 2 | 1 | 201 | 178 | +23 | 5 |
| Jordan | 3 | 1 | 2 | 173 | 200 | −27 | 4 |
| Syria | 3 | 0 | 3 | 185 | 217 | −32 | 3 |

November 22
16:00

Report

| Jordan | 51–70 | Iran |
Scoring by quarter: 12–20, 9–24, 20–18, 10–8
| Pts: Kanaan 20; Rebs: Al-Naser 8 Asts: Kanaan, Al-Syouri, Al-Naser 2 | | Pts: Sedighi 20; Rebs: Sedighi 15; Asts: Yousefi 5 |

Stadium Bandaraya, Johor Bahru

November 22
18:00

Report

| Philippines | 71–57 | Syria |
Scoring by quarter: 16–16, 13–14, 16–14, 26–13
| Pts: Teng 16; Rebs: Ravena 8 Asts: Ravena 4 | | Pts: Otabachi 20; Rebs: Otabachi 13; Asts: Beirakdar 2 |

Stadium Bandaraya, Johor Bahru

November 23
20:00

Report

| Syria | 70–77 | Jordan |
Scoring by quarter: 17–24, 14–16, 20–21, 19–16
| Pts: Otabachi 27; Rebs: Otabachi 8 Asts: Baghajati 4 | | Pts: Kanaan 28; Rebs: Al-Jararah 7 Asts: Kanaan, Al-Syouri 3 |

Stadium Bandaraya, Johor Bahru

November 23
22:00

Report

| Iran | 76–70 | Philippines |
Scoring by quarter: 15–19, 23–7, 21–29, 17–15
| Pts: Mirfattahi 20; Rebs: Mirfattahi 17; Asts: Yousefi 2 | | Pts: Ravena 26; Rebs: Pate 7 Asts: Pessumal 3 |

Stadium Bandaraya, Johor Bahru

November 24
16:00

| Jordan | 45–60 | Philippines |
Scoring by quarter: 8–17, 10–14, 11–17, 16–12
| Pts: Al-Ghzawi 18 | | Pts: Ravena 13 |

Stadium Bandaraya, Johor Bahru

November 24
18:00

Report

| Syria | 58–69 | Iran |
Scoring by quarter: 18–20, 12–11, 12–12, 16–26
| Pts: Rahal 19; Rebs: Otabachi 17; Asts: Baghajati 4 | | Pts: Yousefi 23; Rebs: Mirfattahi 7 Asts: Yousefi 4 |

Stadium Bandaraya, Johor Bahru

=== Group III ===
| Team | Pld | W | L | PF | PA | PD | Pts | Tiebreaker |
|---|---|---|---|---|---|---|---|---|
| India | 3 | 2 | 1 | 175 | 146 | +29 | 5 | 1–0 |
| Bahrain | 3 | 2 | 1 | 184 | 176 | +8 | 5 | 0–1 |
| Singapore | 3 | 1 | 2 | 201 | 181 | +20 | 4 | 1–0 |
| Thailand | 3 | 1 | 2 | 167 | 224 | −57 | 4 | 0–1 |

November 22
8:00

Report

| India | 52–55 | Thailand |
Scoring by quarter: 10–16, 24–8, 10–7, 8–24
| Pts: Panigrahi 21; Rebs: Panigrahi, Sukhjeet 10; Asts: Sunder 2 | | Pts: Buranachan 18; Rebs: Thongkam, Mattayamanan 8 Asts: Rattanapansri 3 |

Stadium Bandaraya, Johor Bahru

November 22
10:00

Report

| Bahrain | 64–58 | Singapore |
Scoring by quarter: 15–20, 24–13, 13–10, 12–15
| Pts: Jamal 30; Rebs: Husain 11; Asts: Jaber 3 | | Pts: Goh, Liew 15; Rebs: Goh 16; Asts: Goh 3 |

Stadium Bandaraya, Johor Bahru

November 23
12:00

Report

| Singapore | 51–65 | India |
Scoring by quarter: 10–14, 15–12, 14–25, 12–14
| Pts: Ng W.X. 15; Rebs: Goh 9 Asts: Five players 1 | | Pts: Sunder 15; Rebs: Joginder 10; Asts: Sunder 3 |

Stadium Bandaraya, Johor Bahru

November 23
14:00

Report

| Thailand | 60–80 | Bahrain |
Scoring by quarter: 12–21, 14–19, 13–21, 21–19
| Pts: Mattayamanan 18; Rebs: Kongsang 10; Asts: Mattayamanan 2 | | Pts: Jamal 25; Rebs: Husain 8 Asts: Ali 4 |

Stadium Bandaraya, Johor Bahru

November 24
8:00

Report

| India | 58–40 | Bahrain |
Scoring by quarter: 9–10, 13–7, 21–12, 15–11
| Pts: Sunder 19; Rebs: Panigrahi 16; Asts: Sunder 3 | | Pts: Husain 16; Rebs: Husain 11; Asts: Yousif, Mansoor 1 |

Stadium Bandaraya, Johor Bahru

November 24
10:00

Report

| Singapore | 92–52 | Thailand |
Scoring by quarter: 28–9, 28–14, 20–21, 16–8
| Pts: Su 27; Rebs: Goh 7 Asts: Goh, Ibrahim 2 | | Pts: Buranachan 18; Rebs: Mattayamanan 8 Asts: Thongkam 4 |

Stadium Bandaraya, Johor Bahru

=== Group IV ===
| Team | Pld | W | L | PF | PA | PD | Pts | Tiebreaker |
|---|---|---|---|---|---|---|---|---|
| Kazakhstan | 3 | 2 | 1 | 202 | 163 | +39 | 5 | 1–1 / 1.104 |
| Malaysia | 3 | 2 | 1 | 216 | 205 | +11 | 5 | 1–1 / 1.031 |
| Kuwait | 3 | 2 | 1 | 179 | 176 | +3 | 5 | 1–1 / 0.875 |
| Saudi Arabia | 3 | 0 | 3 | 155 | 208 | −53 | 3 | |

November 22
12:00

Report

| Saudi Arabia | 77–84 | Malaysia |
Scoring by quarter: 20–21, 5–16, 28–30, 24–17
| Pts: Abo-Jalas 31; Rebs: Al-Dossary 9 Asts: Mobarki, Al-Mukhtar 2 | | Pts: Loh S.W. 27; Rebs: Loh S.W. 12; Asts: Yeo 3 |

Stadium Bandaraya, Johor Bahru

November 22
14:00

Report

| Kazakhstan | 63–66 | Kuwait |
Scoring by quarter: 22–16, 17–18, 11–11, 13–21
| Pts: Zhigulin 23; Rebs: Zhigulin 13; Asts: Kurochka 5 | | Pts: Shuaib 25; Rebs: Al-Shammari 7 Asts: Shuaib 3 |

Stadium Bandaraya, Johor Bahru

November 23
8:00

Report

| Kuwait | 60–40 | Saudi Arabia |
Scoring by quarter: 12–12, 12–6, 20–9, 16–13
| Pts: Abu Dhom 17; Rebs: Al-Shammari 14; Asts: Shuaib 4 | | Pts: Al-Mukhtar 10; Rebs: Abo-Jalas 11; Asts: Al-Dossary, Abo-Jalas 2 |

Stadium Bandaraya, Johor Bahru

November 23
10:00

Report

| Malaysia | 59–75 | Kazakhstan |
Scoring by quarter: 16–24, 15–13, 18–21, 10–17
| Pts: Loh S.W. 22; Rebs: Yeo 8 Asts: Ang 2 | | Pts: Orazov 18; Rebs: Kaliullin, Orazov 9 Asts: Orazov 2 |

Stadium Bandaraya, Johor Bahru

November 24
12:00

Report

| Saudi Arabia | 38–64 | Kazakhstan |
Scoring by quarter: 7–15, 9–22, 13–12, 9–15
| Pts: Al-Mukhtar 14; Rebs: Abo-Jalas 12; Asts: 0 | | Pts: Raguyev 15; Rebs: Zhigulin 13; Asts: Four players 1 |

Stadium Bandaraya, Johor Bahru

November 24
14:00

Report

| Kuwait | 53–73 | Malaysia |
Scoring by quarter: 14–14, 13–9, 9–27, 17–23
| Pts: Abu Dhom 17; Rebs: Al-Bader 11; Asts: Al-Mehini 3 | | Pts: Fong Y.Y. 30; Rebs: Tan H.K. 8 Asts: Ang 4 |

Stadium Bandaraya, Johor Bahru

== Classification 9th–16th ==
=== 15th place ===
November 26
10:00

Report

| Thailand | 61–72 | Saudi Arabia |
Scoring by quarter: 12–22, 22–12, 14–19, 13–19
| Pts: Kongtawee 22; Rebs: Kongsang 11; Asts: Kongtawee 4 | | Pts: Al-Mukhtar 22; Rebs: Al-Mukhtar 7 Asts: Mobarki, Al-Dossary, Al-Mukhtar 3 |

Stadium Bandaraya, Johor Bahru

=== 13th place ===
November 26
12:00

Report

| Singapore | 60–66 | Kuwait |
Scoring by quarter: 8–13, 21–26, 9–15, 22–12
| Pts: Low 14; Rebs: Goh 13; Asts: Su, Low, Liew 1 | | Pts: Shuaib 18; Rebs: Al-Oun 13; Asts: Shuaib 4 |

Stadium Bandaraya, Johor Bahru

=== 11th place ===
November 27
10:00

Report

| Bahrain | 73–83 | Malaysia |
Scoring by quarter: 8–19, 10–25, 21–21, 34–18
| Pts: Jamal 22; Rebs: Husain 13; Asts: Husain, Yousif, Jamal 2 | | Pts: Loh S.W. 27; Rebs: Loh S.W. 18; Asts: Loh S.W. 6 |

Stadium Bandaraya, Johor Bahru

=== 9th place ===
November 27
12:00

Report

| India | 49–59 | Kazakhstan |
Scoring by quarter: 14–15, 20–16, 5–9, 10–19
| Pts: Sunder 19; Rebs: Singh 6 Asts: Sunder 2 | | Pts: Zhigulin 24; Rebs: Zhigulin 16; Asts: Orazov 3 |

Stadium Bandaraya, Johor Bahru

== Classification 5th–8th ==
Semifinals
November 26
Chinese Taipei | 75
Syria | 50
November 26
Jordan | 55
Japan | 100

5th place
November 27
Chinese Taipei | 71
Japan | 66
7th place
November 27
Syria | 87
Jordan | 51

=== Semifinals ===
November 26
14:00

Report

| Chinese Taipei | 75–50 | Syria |
Scoring by quarter: 26–14, 16–9, 23–19, 10–8
| Pts: Chen Y.C. 18; Rebs: Chen Y.C., Chen K.C. 6 Asts: Kao P.Y. 7 | | Pts: Otabachi 15; Rebs: Beirakdar, Otabachi 9 Asts: Beirakdar 2 |

Stadium Bandaraya, Johor Bahru

November 26
16:00

Report

| Jordan | 55–100 | Japan |
Scoring by quarter: 9–26, 10–16, 13–27, 23–31
| Pts: Al-Ghzawi 19; Rebs: Al-Dwairi 13; Asts: Abu Ali 2 | | Pts: Aratani 28; Rebs: Hareyama 9 Asts: Tano 9 |

Stadium Bandaraya, Johor Bahru

=== 7th place ===
November 27
14:00

Report

| Syria | 87–51 | Jordan |
Scoring by quarter: 25–16, 23–10, 20–13, 19–12
| Pts: Rahal 26; Rebs: Beirakdar 14; Asts: Sirjieh 5 | | Pts: Abu Wazneh 18; Rebs: Al-Taweel 7 Asts: Kanaan 2 |

Stadium Bandaraya, Johor Bahru

=== 5th place ===
November 27
16:00

Report

| Chinese Taipei | 71–66 | Japan |
Scoring by quarter: 17–10, 20–8, 20–25, 14–23
| Pts: Yang H.C. 20; Rebs: Kao P.Y. 11; Asts: Kao P.Y. 4 | | Pts: Tawatari 18; Rebs: Hareyama 10; Asts: Tano 4 |

Stadium Bandaraya, Johor Bahru

== Final round ==
Semifinals
November 26
China | 85
Philippines | 66
November 26
Iran | 81
South Korea | 82

Final
November 27
China | 104
South Korea | 69
3rd place
November 27
Philippines | 73
Iran (OT) | 83

=== Semifinals ===
November 26
18:00

Report

| China | 85–66 | Philippines |
Scoring by quarter: 15–19, 21–13, 19–15, 30–19
| Pts: Ju M.X. 18; Rebs: Zhai X.C. 14; Asts: Shi H.F. 3 | | Pts: Teng 18; Rebs: Teng 5 Asts: Sara, Romero 3 |

Stadium Bandaraya, Johor Bahru

November 26
20:00

Report

| Iran | 81–82 | South Korea |
Scoring by quarter: 18–24, 17–18, 30–21, 16–19
| Pts: Sedighi 30; Rebs: Sedighi 18; Asts: Ojaghi, Yousefi 3 | | Pts: Lee J.H. 19; Rebs: Choi C.J. 14; Asts: Choi C.J. 12 |

Stadium Bandaraya, Johor Bahru

=== 3rd place ===
November 27
18:00

| Philippines | 73–83 (OT) | Iran |
Scoring by quarter: 15–12, 16–25, 22–19, 17–14, Overtime: 3–13
| Pts: Ravena 18 | | Pts: Yousefi 18 |

Stadium Bandaraya, Johor Bahru

=== Final ===
November 27
20:00

| China | 104–69 | South Korea |
Scoring by quarter: 28–21, 23–20, 24–19, 29–9
| Pts: Zhai X.C. 20; Rebs: Zhai X.C. 17; Asts: Guo A.L. 3 | | Pts: Choi C.J. 24; Rebs: Kim H.J., Lee J.H. 4 Asts: Choi C.J. 3 |

Stadium Bandaraya, Johor Bahru

== Final standing ==
| Qualified for the 2010 FIBA Under-17 World Championship |

| Rank | Team | Record |
|---|---|---|
| 1st place, gold medalist(s) | China | 8–0 |
| 2nd place, silver medalist(s) | South Korea | 6–2 |
| 3rd place, bronze medalist(s) | Iran | 7–1 |
| 4 | Philippines | 5–3 |
| 5 | Chinese Taipei | 5–3 |
| 6 | Japan | 2–6 |
| 7 | Syria | 3–5 |
| 8 | Jordan | 3–5 |
| 9 | Kazakhstan | 4–3 |
| 10 | India | 3–4 |
| 11 | Malaysia | 4–3 |
| 12 | Bahrain | 3–4 |
| 13 | Kuwait | 3–4 |
| 14 | Singapore | 2–5 |
| 15 | Saudi Arabia | 1–6 |
| 16 | Thailand | 1–6 |

== Awards ==
2009 Asian Under-16 champions

China
First title
