= Mustafa Al-Hawsawi (basketball) =

Saudi Arabian basketball player

Mustafa Alhwsawi
Personal information
- Born: May 4, 1983 (age 43) Medina, Saudi Arabia
- Listed height: 6 ft 4 in (1.93 m)

Career information
- Playing career: 2009–present
- Position: Power forward

Mustafa Alhwsawi (Arabic: مصطفى الهوساوي; born May 4, 1983) is a Saudi Arabian professional basketball player. He currently plays for the Al-Ittihad Jeddah Sports Club of the Saudi Premier League.

He played most minutes for the Saudi Arabia national basketball team at the 2014 Asian Games in South Korea.

== Career overview ==
Alhwsawi played professional basketball for the following teams:

- 2009–2014: Al Ansar, Medina (Saudi Arabia) (Saudi Premier League)
- 2014–20??: Al Nassr, Riyadh (Saudi Arabia) (Saudi Premier League)
- 20??–2023: Al Taawoun, Buraidah (Saudi Arabia) (Saudi Premier League)
- 2023–present: Al Ittihad, Jeddah (Saudi Arabia) (Saudi Premier League)
