= Al-Arabi (Saudi Arabia, basketball club) =

- Leagues: Saudi First Division
- Arena: Al-Arabi Indoor Arena
- Location: Unaizah, Al-Qassim province, Saudi Arabia
- Team colors: Red and White
- President: Abdulaziz Al Dera

Al-Arabi is a professional basketball club based in the city of Unaizah in the Al-Qassim Province, Saudi Arabia that formerly played in the Saudi Premier League.

== See also ==
- Al-Arabi sport club

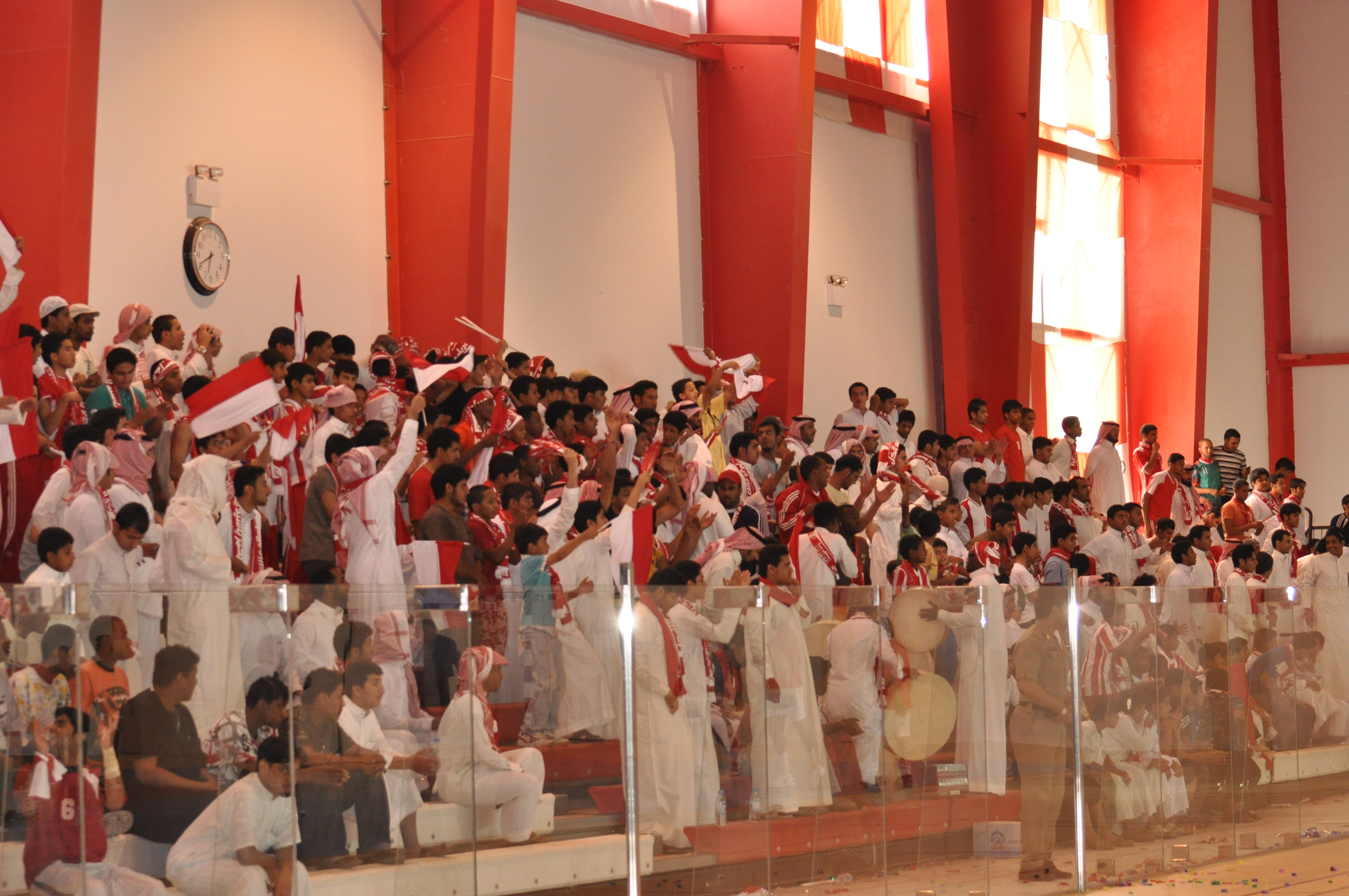
Al-Arabi Indoor Arena.
