= Marzouq Al-Muwallad =

Saudi Arabian basketball player

Al-Ahli Jeddah
- Position: Point guard
- League: Saudi Premier League

Personal information
- Born: August 6, 1992 (age 34) Medina, Saudi Arabia
- Listed height: 6 ft 0 in (1.83 m)

Career information
- Playing career: 2013–present

Career history
- 2013–2016: Al-Ansar
- 2016–present: Al-Ahli Jeddah

Marzouq Al-Muwallad (Arabic: مرزوق المولد; born August 6, 1992) is a Saudi Arabian professional basketball player. He currently plays for the Al-Ahli Jeddah Sports Club of the Saudi Premier League.

He has been a member of Saudi Arabia's national basketball team on many occasions. At the 2013 FIBA Asia Championship, he was Saudi Arabia's best passer and stealer.

He was the match-winner in the game against Thailand, when he scored 20 points and handed out 10 assists.
