= 1999 ABC Championship =

1999年バスケットボール男子アジア選手権

Tournament details
- Host country: Japan
- Dates: August 28 – September 5
- Teams: 15
- Venues: 2 (in 1 host city)

Final positions
- Champions: China (11th title)
- Runners-up: South Korea
- Third place: Saudi Arabia
- Fourth place: Chinese Taipei

Tournament statistics
- MVP: (China) Hu Weidong

The 1999 Asian Basketball Confederation Championship for Men was the qualifying tournament for the Basketball Tournament at the 2000 Summer Olympics in Sydney, Australia.

It was played in Fukuoka, Japan.

== Qualification ==
According to the ABC rules, each zone had two places, and the hosts (Japan) and the best 5 teams of the previous Asian Championship were automatically qualified.

| East Asia (4+2) | Gulf (2+2) | Middle Asia (2) | Southeast Asia (2) | West Asia (2) |
|---|---|---|---|---|
| Japan | Saudi Arabia | Uzbekistan | Philippines | Syria |
| South Korea | United Arab Emirates | Kazakhstan | Thailand | Lebanon |
| China | Kuwait | | | |
| Chinese Taipei | Bahrain | | | |
| Hong Kong | | | | |
| North Korea | | | | |

== Draw ==
The draw was held on June 15 at New Otani Hotel in Tokyo.

| Group A | Group B | Group C | Group D |
|---|---|---|---|
| South Korea; United Arab Emirates; Lebanon; Philippines | Japan; Thailand; Hong Kong; Kuwait | China; ~~Kazakhstan~~ * Syria; ~~North Korea~~ * | Saudi Arabia; Uzbekistan; Chinese Taipei; Bahrain |

* North Korea and Kazakhstan pulled out of the tournament, leaving Group C with only two teams. ABC added Malaysia into the bracket.

== Preliminary round ==
=== Group A ===
| Team | Pld | W | L | PF | PA | PD | Pts |
|---|---|---|---|---|---|---|---|
| Lebanon | 3 | 3 | 0 | 210 | 185 | +25 | 6 |
| South Korea | 3 | 2 | 1 | 251 | 189 | +62 | 5 |
| United Arab Emirates | 3 | 1 | 2 | 216 | 244 | −28 | 4 |
| Philippines | 3 | 0 | 3 | 194 | 253 | −59 | 3 |

August 28
15:00

| South Korea | 98–63 | Philippines |
Scoring by half: 58–38, 40–25

Kokusai Center, Fukuoka

August 28
19:00

| United Arab Emirates | 70–75 | Lebanon |
Scoring by half: 43–36, 27–39

Kokusai Center, Fukuoka

August 29
15:00

| Lebanon | 75–65 | South Korea |
Scoring by half: 40–34, 35–31

Kokusai Center, Fukuoka

August 29
15:00

| Philippines | 81–95 | United Arab Emirates |
Scoring by half: 44–56, 37–39

Civic Gymnasium, Fukuoka

August 30
15:00

| South Korea | 88–51 | United Arab Emirates |
Scoring by half: 51–26, 37–25

Kokusai Center, Fukuoka

August 30
17:00

| Philippines | 50–60 | Lebanon |
Scoring by half: 25–31, 25–29

Kokusai Center, Fukuoka

=== Group B ===
| Team | Pld | W | L | PF | PA | PD | Pts |
|---|---|---|---|---|---|---|---|
| Japan | 3 | 3 | 0 | 259 | 135 | +124 | 6 |
| Kuwait | 3 | 2 | 1 | 240 | 228 | +12 | 5 |
| Thailand | 3 | 1 | 2 | 207 | 280 | −73 | 4 |
| Hong Kong | 3 | 0 | 3 | 202 | 265 | −63 | 3 |

August 28
13:00

| Japan | 85–38 | Thailand |
Scoring by half: 39–19, 46–19

Kokusai Center, Fukuoka

August 28
13:00

| Kuwait | 88–62 | Hong Kong |
Scoring by half: 33–38, 55–24

Civic Gymnasium, Fukuoka

August 29
13:00

| Hong Kong | 58–88 | Japan |
Scoring by half: 38–31, 20–57

Kokusai Center, Fukuoka

August 29
13:00

| Thailand | 80–113 | Kuwait |
Scoring by half: 43–56, 37–57

Civic Gymnasium, Fukuoka

August 30
13:00

| Japan | 86–39 | Kuwait |
Scoring by half: 44–21, 42–18

Kokusai Center, Fukuoka

August 30
13:00

| Thailand | 89–82 | Hong Kong |
Scoring by half: 45–47, 44–35

Civic Gymnasium, Fukuoka

=== Group C ===
| Team | Pld | W | L | PF | PA | PD | Pts |
|---|---|---|---|---|---|---|---|
| China | 2 | 2 | 0 | 166 | 102 | +64 | 4 |
| Syria | 2 | 1 | 1 | 153 | 176 | −23 | 3 |
| Malaysia | 2 | 0 | 2 | 105 | 146 | −41 | 2 |

August 28
17:00

| China | 54–41 | Malaysia |
Scoring by half: 34–22, 20–19

Kokusai Center, Fukuoka

August 29
17:00

| Syria | 61–112 | China |
Scoring by half: 17–63, 44–49

Kokusai Center, Fukuoka

August 30
15:00

| Malaysia | 62–92 | Syria |
Scoring by half: 26–48, 38–44

Civic Gymnasium, Fukuoka

=== Group D ===
| Team | Pld | W | L | PF | PA | PD | Pts |
|---|---|---|---|---|---|---|---|
| Chinese Taipei | 3 | 3 | 0 | 250 | 219 | +31 | 6 |
| Saudi Arabia | 3 | 2 | 1 | 239 | 218 | +21 | 5 |
| Uzbekistan | 3 | 1 | 2 | 207 | 219 | −12 | 4 |
| Bahrain | 3 | 0 | 3 | 169 | 209 | −40 | 3 |

August 28
15:00

| Saudi Arabia | 79–63 | Bahrain |
Scoring by half: 32–28, 47–35

Civic Gymnasium, Fukuoka

August 28
17:00

| Uzbekistan | 82–90 | Chinese Taipei |
Scoring by half: 35–41, 47–49

Civic Gymnasium, Fukuoka

August 29
17:00

| Bahrain | 47–62 | Uzbekistan |
Scoring by half: 20–28, 27–34

Civic Gymnasium, Fukuoka

August 29
19:00

| Chinese Taipei | 92–78 | Saudi Arabia |
Scoring by half: 50–36, 42–42

Kokusai Center, Fukuoka

August 30
17:00

| Saudi Arabia | 82–63 | Uzbekistan |
Scoring by half: 45–32, 37–31

Civic Gymnasium, Fukuoka

August 30
19:00

| Chinese Taipei | 68–59 | Bahrain |
Scoring by half: 39–24, 29–35

Kokusai Center, Fukuoka

== Quarterfinal round ==
=== Group I ===
| Team | Pld | W | L | PF | PA | PD | Pts |
|---|---|---|---|---|---|---|---|
| China | 3 | 3 | 0 | 283 | 177 | +106 | 6 |
| Saudi Arabia | 3 | 2 | 1 | 241 | 234 | +7 | 5 |
| Kuwait | 3 | 1 | 2 | 220 | 265 | −45 | 4 |
| Lebanon | 3 | 0 | 3 | 217 | 285 | −68 | 3 |

August 31
13:00

| Lebanon | 69–92 | Saudi Arabia |
Scoring by half: 44–48, 25–44

Kokusai Center, Fukuoka

August 31
15:00

| China | 91–54 | Kuwait |
Scoring by half: 41–20, 50–34

Kokusai Center, Fukuoka

September 1
13:00

| Kuwait | 86–81 | Lebanon |
Scoring by half: 40–45, 46–36

Kokusai Center, Fukuoka

September 1
15:00

| Saudi Arabia | 56–85 | China |
Scoring by half: 22–44, 34–41

Kokusai Center, Fukuoka

September 2
13:00

| Lebanon | 67–107 | China |
Scoring by half: 39–52, 28–55

Kokusai Center, Fukuoka

September 2
15:00

| Kuwait | 80–93 | Saudi Arabia |
Scoring by half: 40–47, 40–46

Kokusai Center, Fukuoka

=== Group II ===
| Team | Pld | W | L | PF | PA | PD | Pts |
|---|---|---|---|---|---|---|---|
| South Korea | 3 | 3 | 0 | 195 | 177 | +18 | 6 |
| Chinese Taipei | 3 | 2 | 1 | 220 | 210 | +10 | 5 |
| Japan | 3 | 1 | 2 | 207 | 199 | +8 | 4 |
| Syria | 3 | 0 | 3 | 201 | 237 | −36 | 3 |

August 31
17:00

| Japan | 78–58 | Syria |
Scoring by half: 38–27, 40–31

Kokusai Center, Fukuoka

August 31
19:00

| Chinese Taipei | 54–61 | South Korea |
Scoring by half: 20–34, 34–27

Kokusai Center, Fukuoka

September 1
17:00

| South Korea | 64–61 | Japan |
Scoring by half: 34–31, 30–30

Kokusai Center, Fukuoka

September 1
19:00

| Syria | 81–89 | Chinese Taipei |
Scoring by half: 37–39, 44–50

Kokusai Center, Fukuoka

September 2
17:00

| Japan | 68–77 | Chinese Taipei |
Scoring by half: 37–36, 31–41

Kokusai Center, Fukuoka

September 2
19:00

| South Korea | 70–62 | Syria |
Scoring by half: 30–38, 40–24

Kokusai Center, Fukuoka

=== Group III ===
| Team | Pld | W | L | PF | PA | PD | Pts |
|---|---|---|---|---|---|---|---|
| United Arab Emirates | 3 | 3 | 0 | 261 | 235 | +26 | 6 |
| Bahrain | 3 | 2 | 1 | 255 | 234 | +21 | 5 |
| Hong Kong | 3 | 1 | 2 | 247 | 246 | +1 | 4 |
| Malaysia | 3 | 0 | 3 | 219 | 267 | −48 | 3 |

August 31
13:00

| United Arab Emirates | 79–72 | Bahrain |
Scoring by half: 28–34, 51–38

Civic Gymnasium, Fukuoka

August 31
15:00

| Malaysia | 59–89 | Hong Kong |
Scoring by half: 32–44, 27–45

Civic Gymnasium, Fukuoka

September 1
13:00

| Hong Kong | 88–94 | United Arab Emirates |
Scoring by half: 41–41, 47–53

Civic Gymnasium, Fukuoka

September 1
15:00

| Bahrain | 90–85 | Malaysia |
Scoring by half: 44–37, 46–48

Civic Gymnasium, Fukuoka

September 2
13:00

| United Arab Emirates | 88–75 | Malaysia |
Scoring by half: 47–42, 41–33

Civic Gymnasium, Fukuoka

September 2
15:00

| Hong Kong | 70–93 | Bahrain |
Scoring by half: 50–39, 20–54

Civic Gymnasium, Fukuoka

=== Group IV ===
| Team | Pld | W | L | PF | PA | PD | Pts |
|---|---|---|---|---|---|---|---|
| Uzbekistan | 2 | 2 | 0 | 177 | 135 | +42 | 4 |
| Philippines | 2 | 1 | 1 | 146 | 152 | −6 | 3 |
| Thailand | 2 | 0 | 2 | 129 | 165 | −36 | 2 |

August 31
17:00

| Uzbekistan | 94–64 | Philippines |
Scoring by half: 52–30, 42–34

Civic Gymnasium, Fukuoka

September 1
17:00

| Philippines | 82–58 | Thailand |
Scoring by half: 46–31, 36–27

Civic Gymnasium, Fukuoka

September 2
17:00

| Thailand | 71–83 | Uzbekistan |
Scoring by half: 34–44, 37–39

Civic Gymnasium, Fukuoka

== Classification 5th–14th ==
=== 13th place ===
September 3
13:00

| Hong Kong | 68–53 | Thailand |
Scoring by half: 39–22, 29–31

Kokusai Center, Fukuoka

=== 11th place ===
September 3
15:00

| Bahrain | 75–83 | Philippines |
Scoring by half: 31–46, 44–37

Kokusai Center, Fukuoka

=== 9th place ===
September 3
17:00

| Uzbekistan | 70–56 | United Arab Emirates |
Scoring by half: 42–22, 28–34

Kokusai Center, Fukuoka

=== 7th place ===
September 4
10:00

| Lebanon | 61–60 | Syria |
Scoring by half: 27–34, 34–26

Kokusai Center, Fukuoka

=== 5th place ===
September 4
12:00

| Kuwait | 61–77 | Japan |
Scoring by half: 25–45, 36–32

Kokusai Center, Fukuoka

== Final round ==
Semifinals
September 4
South Korea | 85
Saudi Arabia | 59
September 4
China | 105
Chinese Taipei | 51

Final
September 5
South Korea | 45
China | 63
3rd place
September 5
Saudi Arabia | 93
Chinese Taipei | 67

=== Semifinals ===
September 4
14:00

| South Korea | 85–59 | Saudi Arabia |
Scoring by half: 42–30, 43–29

Kokusai Center, Fukuoka

September 4
16:00

| China | 105–51 | Chinese Taipei |
Scoring by half: 55–23, 50–28

Kokusai Center, Fukuoka

=== 3rd place ===
September 5
11:00

| Saudi Arabia | 93–67 | Chinese Taipei |
Scoring by half: 38–39, 55–28

Kokusai Center, Fukuoka

=== Final ===
September 5
13:00

| South Korea | 45–63 | China |
Scoring by half: 21–29, 24–34

Kokusai Center, Fukuoka

== Final standings ==
| Qualified for the 2000 Summer Olympics |

| Rank | Team | Record |
|---|---|---|
| 1st place, gold medalist(s) | China | 7–0 |
| 2nd place, silver medalist(s) | South Korea | 6–2 |
| 3rd place, bronze medalist(s) | Saudi Arabia | 5–3 |
| 4 | Chinese Taipei | 5–3 |
| 5 | Japan | 5–2 |
| 6 | Kuwait | 3–4 |
| 7 | Lebanon | 4–3 |
| 8 | Syria | 1–5 |
| 9 | Uzbekistan | 4–2 |
| 10 | United Arab Emirates | 4–3 |
| 11 | Philippines | 2–4 |
| 12 | Bahrain | 2–5 |
| 13 | Hong Kong | 2–5 |
| 14 | Thailand | 1–5 |
| 15 | Malaysia | 0–5 |

== Awards ==
1999 Asian champions

China
Eleventh title

- Most Valuable Player: (China) Hu Weidong
- Best 3-Pointer: (Japan) Makoto Hasegawa
- Sportsmanship Award: (Saudi Arabia) Ali Al-Maghrabi
