= Mohammed Al-Marwani =

Saudi Arabian basketball player

Al-Wehda
- Position: Center
- League: Saudi Premier League

Personal information
- Born: July 24, 1989 (age 37) Jeddah, Saudi Arabia
- Listed height: 6 ft 8 in (2.03 m)

Career information
- Playing career: 2011–present

Career history
- 2011–2020: Al-Ittihad Jeddah
- 2020–present: Al-Wehda

Mohammed Al-Marwani (Arabic: محمد المرواني; born July 24, 1989) is a Saudi Arabian professional basketball player for Al-Wehda of the Saudi Premier League.
