= Amarendra Nayak =

Indian basketball player (born 2003)

Amarendra Nayak (born 21 March 2003) is an Indian basketball player from Odisha. He plays for the India men's national basketball team and for the Chandigarh and Indian Railways team in the domestic tournaments as a forward. He also plays 3x3 basketball and represented Panjim Thunderbots in the 2024 Goa Basketball League 3x3.

== Early life and education ==
Nayak is from Cuttack, Odisha but resides in Chandigarh. He is the son of Swarnalatha and Satyabrata Naya, a former Odisha basketball player. Due to his father's Railway job, he spent his childhood in Kolkata but later moved to Chandigarh. He is educated at Sri Guru Gobind College, Chandigarh. In 2022, he joined Indian Railways. He never played for his home state, Odisha. He is a Grade A player and received monthly remuneration from Basketball Federation of India.

== Career ==
Nayak captained the Chandigarh team which won a silver medal at the 71st Junior National Basketball Championship in Indore in January 2022. He also represented Indian Railways in the 4th 3x3 Senior National Basketball Championship 2024 held in January 2025.

He played for the junior India team in the FIBA U16 Asian Championship SABA Qualifier in 2019. He made his senior India debut against Jordan at the 2021 FIBA Basketball World Cup 2023 Asian Qualifiers in August 2022. He represented the Indian senior team in the 2022 FIBA Asia Cup and the FIBA Asia Cup 2025 qualifiers held at Kazakhstan and New Delhi in February 2024.
