= Ahmed Al-Mukhtar =

Saudi Arabian basketball player

Ahmed Almukhtar
Uhud Medina
- Position: Forward
- League: Saudi Premier League

Personal information
- Born: February 19, 1993 (age 33) Medina
- Listed height: 6 ft 3 in (1.91 m)

Career information
- Playing career: 2013–present

Career history
- 2013–present: Uhud Medina

Ahmed Almukhtar (Arabic: أحمد المختار; born February 19, 1993) is a Saudi Arabian professional basketball player. He currently plays for Uhud Medina of the Saudi Premier League.

He represented Saudi Arabia's national basketball team at the 2017 Arab Nations Basketball Championship in Egypt. There, he was his team's best 3 point shooter.
