= Fahad Belal =

Saudi Arabian basketball player

Uhud Medina
- Position: Point guard
- League: Saudi Premier League

Personal information
- Born: April 30, 1991 (age 35) Medina, Saudi Arabia
- Listed height: 5 ft 10 in (1.78 m)

Career information
- Playing career: 2011–present

Career history
- 2011–present: Uhud Medina

Fahad Al-Salik Belal (Arabic: فهد السالك; born April 30, 1991, in Medina, Saudi Arabia) is a Saudi Arabian professional basketball player. He currently plays for Uhud Medina of the Saudi Premier League.

He was a member of Saudi Arabia's national basketball team at the 2014 Asian Games in Incheon, South Korea. He was the match winner at Saudi Arabia's victory against India, where he scored a team high 17 points.
