= Kevin Hareyama =

Japanese basketball player

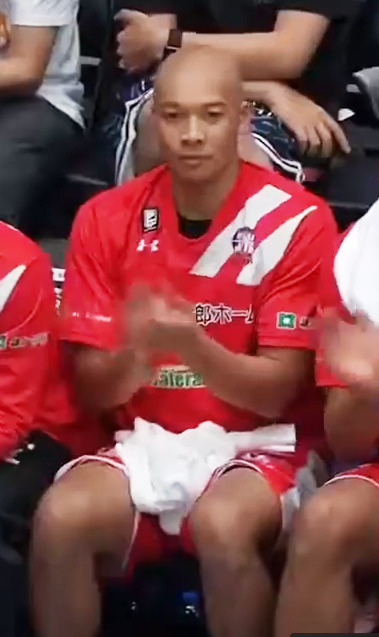

No. 33 – Toyama Grouses
- Position: Small forward
- League: B.League

Personal information
- Born: January 14, 1993 (age 33) Nishine, Iwate
- Listed height: 6 ft 3 in (1.91 m)
- Listed weight: 205 lb (93 kg)

Career information
- High school: Morioka Municipal (Morioka, Iwate)
- College: Tokai University
- Playing career: 2014–present

Career history
- 2014–2017: Toshiba Thunders
- 2017-2019: Kyoto Hannaryz
- 2019-2020: Chiba Jets
- 2020-2021: Shiga Lakestars
- 2021-present: Toyama Grouses

Kevin Hareyama (born January 14, 1993) is a Japanese professional basketball player who plays for Shiga Lakestars of the B.League in Japan. He played college basketball for Tokai University.

== Non-FIBA Events Stats ==
Year	Team	GP	GS	MPG	FG%	3P%	FT%	RPG	APG	SPG	BPG	PPG
2013	Universiade	6		11.51	.261	.250	.857	2.7	0.5	0.7	0	4.0
2015	Universiade	8		20.51	.338	.344	.000	3.1	1.0	1.0	0.1	6.9

== Career statistics ==
Legend
GP	Games played	GS	Games started	MPG	Minutes per game
FG%	Field goal percentage	3P%	3-point field goal percentage	FT%	Free throw percentage
RPG	Rebounds per game	APG	Assists per game	SPG	Steals per game
BPG	Blocks per game	PPG	Points per game	**Bold**	Career high

=== Regular season ===
Year	Team	GP	GS	MPG	FG%	3P%	FT%	RPG	APG	SPG	BPG	PPG
2014-15	Toshiba	10	1	5.9	.316	.125	.000	1.0	0.3	0.2	0.0	1.3
2015-16	Toshiba	40	6	11.6	.401	.385	.667	0.9	0.2	0.4	0.1	4.2
2016-17	Kawasaki	32	6	5.7	.310	.231	.917	0.5	0.1	0.1	0.0	1.8
2017-18	Kyoto	59	44	17.5	.401	.383	.741	2.5	0.4	0.4	0.1	5.5
2018-19	Kyoto	60	60	28.2	.411	.369	.809	3.6	1.2	0.5	0.1	7.8

=== Playoffs ===
Year	Team	GP	GS	MPG	FG%	3P%	FT%	RPG	APG	SPG	BPG	PPG
2017-18	Kyoto	2	2	22.00	.600	.500	1.000	4.0	0.5	0	0	5.0
