= Nassir Abojalas =

Saudi Arabian basketball player

Al-Nassr Riyadh
- Position: Power forward / Center
- League: Saudi Premier League

Personal information
- Born: June 11, 1994 (age 32) Medina
- Listed height: 6 ft 5 in (1.96 m)

Career information
- Playing career: 2013–present

Career history
- 2013–2022: Uhud Medina
- 2022–present: Al-Nassr Riyadh

Nassir Abojalas (Arabic: ناصر أبو جلاس; born June 11, 1994) is a Saudi Arabian professional basketball player. He currently plays for Al-Nassr Riyadh of the Saudi Premier League.

He represented Saudi Arabia's national basketball team at the 2017 Arab Nations Basketball Championship in Egypt. There, he was his team's top scorer.

Further, he represented Saudi Arabia's national 3x3 team at the 2013 FIBA Asia 3x3 Championship in Doha, Qatar, where he led his team to win the silver medal.
