= Al-Fateh (basketball) =

- Nickname: Al Namothji (The Role Model); Abna Al Nakhil (Sons of the Palm)
- Leagues: Saudi Premier League
- Founded: 1958
- Location: Al-Hasa, Eastern Province, Saudi Arabia
- Team colors: Green and blue
- Championships: 1 (2014)

Al-Fateh is a professional basketball club based in Al-Hasa in Saudi Arabia's Eastern Province. The team won the Saudi Premier League championship for the first time in 2013–14. The following season, they finished runners-up to Ohud Medina and won the Prince Faisal Cup.

== Achievements ==
- Saudi Arabia Premier League champion: 2014.
- Saudi Arabia Prince Faisal bin Fahad Cup winner: 2015, 2016.

== Notable players ==
- (United States) O. J. Mayo
- (United States) Glen Rice Jr.
