= Al-Ahli Jeddah (basketball) =

Professional basketball club from Jeddah

- Nickname: Al-Raqi (The Classy)
- Leagues: Saudi Premier League
- Founded: 1938
- Arena: Prince Abdullah Al-Faisal Sports Hall
- Location: Jeddah, Makkah Province, Saudi Arabia
- Team colors
- President: Waleed Muath
- Head coach: Ali Al Sanhani
- Championships: 1

Al-Ahli Jeddah is a professional basketball club based in the city of Jeddah in the Makkah Province, Saudi Arabia that plays in the Saudi Premier League. They won the Premier League in 2006 and 2023.

The home arena of Al-Ahli is the Prince Abdullah Al-Faisal Sports Hall. In the 2023-24 season, Al-Ahli made their debut in the West Asia Super League (WASL).

== Honours ==
=== Domestic ===
- Saudi Basketball League
  - Champions (1): 2023
  - The elite Championship : champions (1): 2006
- Kingdom League (3)
- Western Region Championship (6)
- First Class Cup (3)
- Saudi Alnokhbah Cup (1)
- Saudi Federation Cup (1)
- Saudi Olympic Committee Cup (1)

=== International ===
Arab Club Basketball Championship

- Runners-up (1): 2007
