= Al-Ansar (basketball) =

- Leagues: Saudi Premier League
- Founded: 1965
- Location: Medina, Al Madinah Province, Saudi Arabia
- Team colors: Red and Green
- Head coach: Goran Miljevic
- Championships: 1 (2008)

Al-Ansar is a professional basketball club based in the city of Medina in the Al Madinah Province, Saudi Arabia that plays in the Saudi Premier League. They competed in the 2000 and 2010 Arab Club Championships.

== Achievements ==
- Saudi Arabia Premier League champion: 2008
- Saudi Arabia Prince Faisal bin Fahad Cup winner: 2007, 2009, 2011, 2012, 2013

== Notable players ==
- (Saudi Arabia) Mustafa Al Hosawi
- (Saudi Arabia) Marzouq Almuwallad
- (United States) Kiwi Gardner

== See also ==
- Al-Ansar (Saudi Arabia)
