= Ohud Medina (basketball) =

- Nickname: Al-Jabal (The Mountain)
- Leagues: Saudi Premier League
- Founded: 1939
- Location: Medina, Al Madinah Province, Saudi Arabia
- Team colors: Yellow and brown
- Championships: 20
- Website: Official Website
Home	Away

Ohod Medina (a.k.a. Ohud Medina or Uhud Medina) is a professional basketball club based in the city of Medina in the Al Madinah Province, Saudi Arabia that plays in the Saudi Premier League. Ohud is the most successful team in the Premier League, having won the league title 20 times.

== Honours ==
- Saudi Premier League champion: 1979, 1980, 1981, 1982, 1983, 1984, 1985, 1986, 1987, 1988, 1989, 1991, 1995, 2002, 2003, 2012, 2015, 2018, 2019, 2020 (record 20 cups)
- The elite Championship winner: 1998, 2003, 2010
- Saudi Arabia Prince Faisal bin Fahad Cup winner: 2014

== Current squad ==
Note: Flags indicate national team eligibility at FIBA-sanctioned events. Players may hold other non-FIBA nationalities not displayed.

Ohud Medina roster
Players
Coaches

Pos.	No.	Nat.	Name
F/C	1	(United States)	Wayne Chism
G	8	(Saudi Arabia)	Fahad Belal
C	11	(Saudi Arabia)	Rashad Shuri
F	13	(Saudi Arabia)	Ahmed Almukhtar
F	15	(Saudi Arabia)	Nassir Abojalas
G/F	25	(Saudi Arabia)	Osama Albargawi
PG		(Saudi Arabia)	Fahad Belal Al-Salik

Head coach

Abdul-Rahim Aktar

Legend

- (C) Team captain
- Injured

- Roster
Updated: June 26, 2020

== Notable players ==
To appear in this section a player must have either:

- Set a club record or won an individual award as a professional player.
- Played at least one official international match for his senior national team or one NBA game at any time.

- (Saudi Arabia) Nassir Abojalas
- (Saudi Arabia) Fahad Belal Al-Salik
- (Senegal) Djibril Thiam
- (Albania) (Kosovo) Ersid Ljuca
- (United States) (Iraq) DeMario Mayfield
