= Al-Ittihad Jeddah (basketball) =

- Nickname: (Al-Numoor) "The Tigers"; (Nadi Al-Sha'ab) "The People's Club"; (Nadi Al-Watan) "The Nation's Club"; (Amid Al-Andiyah) "The Chief of Clubs"
- Leagues: Saudi Premier League
- Founded: 1927
- Arena: Prince Abdullah Al-Faisal Basketball Arena
- Capacity: 6,500
- Location: Jeddah, Makkah Province, Saudi Arabia
- Team colors: Yellow and Black
- Head coach: Ali Alsanhani
- Championships: 16
| Home | Away |

Al-Ittihad Jeddah is a basketball club based in the Red Sea port city of Jeddah in Makkah Province, Saudi Arabia that plays in the Saudi Premier League.

== Achievements ==
- Saudi Premier League champion: 1996, 1997, 1998, 1999, 2000, 2001, 2004, 2005, 2006, 2007, 2009, 2010, 2011, 2013, 2016, 2017
- Alnokhbah Championship winner: 1996, 2000, 2001, 2002, 2004, 2005, 2007, 2009, 2012, 2014
- Saudi Arabia Prince Faisal bin Fahad Cup winner: 2004, 2005, 2006, 2017
- Arab Club Basketball Championship:1st (2004); 2nd (2006); 3rd (2007); 4th (2005)
- FIBA Asia Champions Cup: 1st (2001); 2nd (2000, 2002)
- Gulf Club Championships winner : 1997, 1998, 1999, 2000, 2005

== Notable players ==
Note: Flags indicate national team eligibility at FIBA-sanctioned events. Players may hold other non-FIBA nationalities not displayed.

Criteria

To appear in this section a player must have either:

- Set a club record or won an individual award while at the club
- Played at least one official international match for their national team at any time
- Played at least one official NBA match at any time.

- (Syria) Keron DeShields
- (United States) Mahmoud Abdul-Rauf
- (United States) Jermaine Beal
- (United States) God Shammgod

== See also ==
- Al-Ittihad Club (Jeddah)
- Al-Ittihad Club (Jeddah, women)
