= Saudi Basketball League =

Professional basketball league in Saudi Arabia

- Sport: Basketball
- Founded: 1976; 50 years ago
- Organising body: Saudi Arabian Basketball Federation (SBF)
- No. of teams: 10 (men); 6 (women)
- Country: Saudi Arabia
- Continent: FIBA Asia (Asia)
- Most recent champion: Al-Ittihad (17th title) (2024–25)
- Most titles: Ohud (20 titles)
- Broadcaster: SSC
- Feeder to: Basketball Champions League Asia; FIBA West Asia Super League; Arab Club Basketball Championship; Women's Basketball League Asia
- Domestic cups: SBF Cup, 3x3 Cup
- Website: sbl.sa

The Saudi Basketball League (SBL) (Arabic: الدوري السعودي الممتاز لكرة السلة) is the highest tier of men's and women's basketball in Saudi Arabia.

== Current clubs ==
=== Men's league ===
Team	City
Al-Ahli	Jeddah
Al-Fateh	Al-Hofuf
Al-Ittihad	Jeddah
Al-Khaleej	Dammam (Saihat)
Al-Khowildiah	Dammam (Qatif)
Al-Nassr	Riyadh
Al-Safa	Dammam (Qatif)
Al-Salam	Dammam (Qatif)
Al-Ula	Medina
Ohud Medina	Medina

=== Women's League ===
Team	City
Al-Ahli	Jeddah
Al-Ittihad	Jeddah
Al-Nassr	Riyadh
Al-Okhdood	Najran
Al-Qadsiah	Khobar
Al-Ula	Medina

=== Former teams ===
Team	City
Al-Ansar	Medina
Duba	Duba
Al-Hilal	Riyadh
Al-Wahda	Mecca
Al-Nahda	Dammam
Abha	Abha

== Champions of the Saudi Premier League ==
Season	SBPL Winner	Runners-up	The elite Championship Winner	Prince Faisal Cup Winner
1976–77	Al Hilal			
1977–78	Al Shabab			
1978–79	Ohud			
1979–80	Ohud			
1980–81	Ohud			
1981–82	Ohud			
1982–83	Ohud			
1983–84	Ohud			
1984–85	Ohud			
1985–86	Ohud			
1986–87	Ohud			
1987–88	Ohud			
1988–89	Ohud			
1989–90	Al Hilal			
1990–91	Ohud			
1991–92	Al Hilal			
1992–93	Al Hilal			
1993–94	Al Hilal		Al Hilal	
1994–95	Ohud		Al Hilal	
1995–96	Al Ittihad		Al Ittihad	
1996–97	Al Ittihad		Al Hilal	
1997–98	Al Ittihad		Ohud	
1998–99	Al Ittihad		Al Hilal	
1999–2000	Al Ittihad		Al Ittihad	
2000–01	Al Ittihad		Al Ittihad	
2001–02	Ohud		Al Ittihad	
2002–03	Ohud		Ohud	
2003–04	Al Ittihad		Al Ittihad	Al Ittihad
2004–05	Al Ittihad		Al Ittihad	Al Ittihad
2005–06	Al Ittihad		Al Ahli	Al Ittihad
2006–07	Al Ittihad		Al Ittihad	Al Ansar
2007–08	Al Ansar		Al Hilal	
2008–09	Al Ittihad		Al Ittihad	Al Ansar
2009–10	Al Ittihad		Ohud	Al Ahli
2010–11	Al Ittihad			Al Ansar
2011–12	Ohud		Al Ittihad	Al Ansar
2012–13	Al Ittihad			Al Ansar
2013–14	Al Fateh		Al Ittihad	Ohud Medina
2014–15	Ohud			Al Fateh
2015–16	Al Ittihad			Al Fateh
2016–17	Al Ittihad			Al Ittihad
2017–18	Ohud			
2018–19	Ohud			
2019–20	Ohud			
2020–21	Al Nassr			
2021–22	Al Hilal	Al Nassr		
2022–23	Al Ahli	Al Nassr		
2023–24	Al Hilal	Al Ittihad		Al Hilal
2024–25	Al Ittihad	Al Ahli		

== See also ==
- Saudi Women's basketball league
