= 2024–25 FIBA West Asia Super League =

3rd season of the West Asia Super League

2024–25 FIBA WASL season
- League: FIBA West Asia Super League
- Sport: Basketball
- Duration: 21 October 2024 – 18 May 2025
- Teams: 18

Gulf League
- Season champions: (United Arab Emirates) Shabab Al Ahli (1st title)
- Runners-up: (Saudi Arabia) Al Ittihad Jeddah

West Asia League
- Season champions: (Lebanon) Al Riyadi (3rd title)
- Runners-up: (Iran) Tabiat

Final Eight
- Venue: Stade Nouhad Naufal, Zouk Mikael, Lebanon
- Champions: (Lebanon) Al Riyadi (2nd title)
- Runners-up: (Iran) Tabiat

Seasons
- ← 2023–24 2025–26 →

The 2024–25 FIBA West Asia Super League, also known as the FIBA WASL Season 3, was the third season of the West Asia Super League (WASL), the premier basketball competition for Western Asia organised by the FIBA Asia. The season began on 21 October 2024 and ended on 18 May 2025.

Al Riyadi were the defending champions, and successfully defended their title as they won the championship by defeating Tabiat from Iran in the final. As winners, they qualified directly to the 2025 Basketball Champions League Asia.

== Teams ==
The participating teams were officially confirmed by FIBA on 2 October 2024.

- TH: Title holders
- 1st, 2nd, etc.: Ranking in the previous domestic season
- TBD: To be determined

Final Eight
(India) Tamil Nadu (1st)	(Kazakhstan) Astana (1st)		
Group phase
West Asia		Gulf	
(Lebanon) Al Riyadi (1st)^{TH}	(Syria) Al Wahda (1st)	(Qatar) Al Arabi (1st)	(Bahrain) Manama (1st)
(Lebanon) Sagesse (2nd)	(Iraq) Al-Difaa Al-Jawi (1st)	(United Arab Emirates) Shabab Al Ahli (1st)	(Bahrain) Al Ahli Manama (2nd)
(Iran) Tabiat (1st)	(Jordan) Amman United (1st)	Kuwait (1st)	(Oman) Al Bashaer (1st)
		(Kuwait) Al Qadsia (2nd)	(Saudi Arabia) Al Ittihad Jeddah (1st)

== Draw ==
The draw for the sub-zone leagues will be held online on 5 October 2024. Teams from the same country can not been drawn in the same group. As such, there were three pots for the draw and the remaining teams were allocated in the group that does not contain a team from the same country.

West Asia

Pot 1 Team (Lebanon) Al Riyadi (Iran) Tabiat	Pot 2 Team (Syria) Al Wahda (Iraq) Al-Difaa Al-Jawi	Pot 3 Team (Jordan) Amman United	Allocated based on country Team (Lebanon) Sagesse

Gulf League

Pot 1 Team Kuwait (Bahrain) Manama	Pot 2 Team (United Arab Emirates) Shabab Al Ahli (Saudi Arabia) Al Ittihad Jeddah	Pot 3 Team (Oman) Al Bashaer (Qatar) Al Arabi	Allocated based on country Team (Kuwait) Al Qadsia (Bahrain) Al Ahli Manama

== West Asia League ==
Due to instability and uncertainties in the region, the format was changed to a double round-robin format. The top three teams qualify for the Final Eight, while the best-ranked team will be named the West Asia League champion.

Pos	Team	Pld	W	L	GF	GA	GD	Pts	Qualification	RIY	TAB	SAG	DAJ	AUC
1	(Lebanon) Al Riyadi (C)	8	8	0	776	648	+128	16	Advance to Final Eight	—	110–100	100–85	102–93	84–66
2	(Iran) Tabiat	8	5	3	668	671	−3	13	Advance to Final Eight	78–92	—	75–73	92–88	79–64
3	(Lebanon) Sagesse	8	3	5	662	691	−29	11	Advance to Final Eight	59–86	87–88	—	85–89	88–76
4	(Iraq) Al-Difaa Al-Jawi	8	2	6	699	715	−16	10		79–94	83–87	88–91	—	87–96
5	(Jordan) Amman United	8	2	6	621	701	−80	10		88–108	74–69	89–94	68–92	—

Source: WASL
(C) Champions

== Gulf League ==
=== Group phase ===
==== Group A ====
Pos	Team	Pld	W	L	GF	GA	GD	Pts	Qualification	SAH	KUW	AHB	BSH
1	(United Arab Emirates) Shabab Al Ahli	6	4	2	507	440	+67	10	Advance to semi-finals	—	71–75	91–88	83–65
2	Kuwait	6	3	3	446	349	+97	9	Advance to semi-final qualifiers	83–90	—	88–77	103–48
3	(Bahrain) Al Ahli Manama	6	3	3	478	451	+27	9	Advance to semi-final qualifiers	73–76	63–77	—	87–67
4	(Oman) Al Bashaer	6	2	4	288	479	−191	8		56–96	0–20	52–90	—

Source: WASL

==== Group B ====
Pos	Team	Pld	W	L	GF	GA	GD	Pts	Qualification	QAD	MNM	ITJ	ARB
1	(Kuwait) Al Qadsia	6	4	2	494	479	+15	10	Advance to semi-finals	—	90–84	91–83	89–77
2	(Bahrain) Manama	6	4	2	477	470	+7	10	Advance to semi-final qualifiers	87–81	—	78–73	84–85
3	(Saudi Arabia) Al Ittihad Jeddah	6	2	4	453	443	+10	8	Advance to semi-final qualifiers	60–62	66–67	—	86–64
4	(Qatar) Al Arabi	6	2	4	470	502	−32	8		88–81	75–77	81–85	—

Source: WASL

=== Final phase ===
==== Bracket ====
Qualification to semifinals
B2	(Bahrain) Manama	56	100	75
A3	(Bahrain) Al Ahli Manama	65	97	69
A2	Kuwait	87	63
B3	(Saudi Arabia) Al Ittihad Jeddah	96	64

Semifinals
A1	(United Arab Emirates) Shabab Al Ahli	104	88
B2	(Bahrain) Manama	91	81
B1	(Kuwait) Al Qadsia	82	71	74
B3	(Saudi Arabia) Al Ittihad Jeddah	69	74	88

Finals
A1	(United Arab Emirates) Shabab Al Ahli	90	90
B3	(Saudi Arabia) Al Ittihad Jeddah	88	83
Third place
B2	(Bahrain) Manama	73
B1	(Kuwait) Al Qadsia	81

==== Qualification for semi-finals ====
Team 1	Series	Team 2	Game 1	Game 2	Game 3
Manama (Bahrain)	2–1	(Bahrain) Al Ahli Manama	56–65	100–97	75–69
Kuwait	0–2	(Saudi Arabia) Al Ittihad Jeddah	87–96	63–64	–

=== Semi-finals ===
The schedule for the semi-finals was confirmed on 11, 18, and 25 March 2025.

Team 1	Series	Team 2	Game 1	Game 2	Game 3
Shabab Al Ahli (United Arab Emirates)	2–0	(Bahrain) Manama	104–91	88–81	–
Al Qadsia (Kuwait)	1–2	(Saudi Arabia) Al Ittihad Jeddah	82–69	71–74	74–88

=== Third place game ===
The schedule for the third place game was confirmed on 7 April 2025.

Team 1	Score	Team 2
Manama (Bahrain)	73–81	(Kuwait) Al Qadsia

=== Final ===
The schedule for the finals was confirmed on 8 and 15 April 2025.

Team 1	Series	Team 2	Game 1	Game 2	Game 3
Shabab Al Ahli (United Arab Emirates)	2–0	(Saudi Arabia) Al Ittihad Jeddah	90–88	90–83	–

== Final Eight ==
=== Qualified teams ===
Bye

- (India) Tamil Nadu (withdrew)
- (Kazakhstan) Astana

Gulf League

- (Lebanon) Al Riyadi
- (Iran) Tabiat
- (Lebanon) Sagesse

West Asia League

- (United Arab Emirates) Shabab Al Ahli
- (Saudi Arabia) Al Ittihad Jeddah
- (Kuwait) Al Qadsia

=== Group phase ===
==== Group A ====
Pos	Team	Pld	W	L	GF	GA	GD	Pts	Qualification	RIY	SAG	ITJ	AST
1	(Lebanon) Al Riyadi	3	3	0	291	216	+75	6	Advance to semi-finals	—	101–71	97–87	93–58
2	(Lebanon) Sagesse	3	2	1	283	260	+23	5	Advance to semi-finals	71–101	—	99–69	113–90
3	(Saudi Arabia) Al Ittihad Jeddah	3	1	2	235	272	−37	4		87–97	69–99	—	79–76
4	(Kazakhstan) Astana	3	0	3	224	285	−61	3		58–93	90–113	76–79	—

Source: WASL

==== Group B ====
Pos	Team	Pld	W	L	GF	GA	GD	Pts	Qualification	TAB	SAH	QAD
1	(Iran) Tabiat	2	1	1	199	178	+21	3	Advance to semi-finals	—	87–93	112–85
2	(United Arab Emirates) Shabab Al Ahli	2	1	1	169	166	+3	3	Advance to semi-finals	93–87	—	76–79
3	(Kuwait) Al Qadsia	2	1	1	164	188	−24	3		85–112	79–76	—

Source: WASL

=== Final round ===
Semifinals
17 May
(Lebanon) Al Riyadi	97
(United Arab Emirates) Shabab Al Ahli	85
17 May
(Iran) Tabiat	79
(Lebanon) Sagesse	73

Final
18 May
(Lebanon) Al Riyadi	104
(Iran) Tabiat	77
Third place game
18 May
(United Arab Emirates) Shabab Al Ahli	86
(Lebanon) Sagesse	100

==== Semi-finals ====
17 May
17:45

Boxscore

Al Riyadi (Lebanon)	97–85	(United Arab Emirates) Shabab Al Ahli
Scoring by quarter: 31–23, 21–15, 21–24, 24–23
Pts: Georges-Hunt 23; Rebs: Maker 17; Asts: Saoud, Zeinoun 7		Pts: Washington 32; Rebs: three players 6 Asts: Crawford 7

Nouhad Nawfal Sports Complex, Zouk Mikael
Attendance: 797
Referees: Wissam Zein (SYR), Ahmed Ali Yaseen Al-Shuwaili (IRQ), Yuen Chun Yip (HKG)

17 May
20:45

Boxscore

Tabiat (Iran)	79–73	(Lebanon) Sagesse
Scoring by quarter: 26–15, 17–18, 16–16, 20–24
Pts: Vahedi 31; Rebs: Zangeneh 11; Asts: Zangeneh 5		Pts: Jamaleddine 21; Rebs: Jamaleddine, O'Bryant 10; Asts: Lofton 6

Nouhad Nawfal Sports Complex, Zouk Mikael
Attendance: 877
Referees: Zhang Xiao (CHN), Sun Jian (CHN), Taha Al-Hashedi (YEM)

==== Third place game ====
18 May
17:45

Boxscore

Shabab Al Ahli (United Arab Emirates)	86–100	(Lebanon) Sagesse
Scoring by quarter: 18–22, 22–29, 31–23, 15–26
Pts: Washington 31; Rebs: Al-Shabebi 16; Asts: Washington 5		Pts: Khalil 27; Rebs: Lalanne 7 Asts: Khalil 9

Nouhad Nawfal Sports Complex, Zouk Mikael
Attendance: 227
Referees: Wissam Zein (SYR), Zhang Xiao (CHN), Taha Al-Hashedi (YEM)

==== Championship game ====
18 May
18:00

Boxscore

Al Riyadi (Lebanon)	104–77	(Iran) Tabiat
Scoring by quarter: 26–12, 27–25, 23–23, 28–17
Pts: Arakji 28; Rebs: Maker 9 Asts: Arakji 6		Pts: Buva 15; Rebs: Zangeneh 8 Asts: Zangeneh, Vahedi 5

Nouhad Nawfal Sports Complex, Zouk Mikael
Attendance: 3,627
Referees: Sun Jian (CHN), Ahmed Ali Yaseen Al-Shuwali (IRQ), Mohammad Taha (JOR)
