= 2025 Basketball Champions League Asia =

Tournament details
- Host country: United Arab Emirates
- City: Dubai
- Dates: 7–13 June
- Teams: 9
- Venues: 2

Final positions
- Champions: (Japan) Utsunomiya Brex (1st title)
- Runners-up: (Lebanon) Al Riyadi
- Third place: (Mongolia) Ulaanbaatar Xac Broncos
- Fourth place: (United Arab Emirates) Shabab Al Ahli

Tournament statistics
- Games played: 17
- MVP: D. J. Newbill (Utsunomiya Brex)
- Top scorer: Deshawndre Washington (Shabab Al Ahli) (34.3 ppg)
- Top rebounds: Arman Zangeneh (Tabiat) (14.3 rpg)
- Top assists: D. J. Newbill (Utsunomiya Brex) (7.4 apg)

Official website
- 2025 Basketball Champions League Asia

The 2025 Basketball Champions League Asia was the second edition of the Basketball Champions League Asia, and the 30th season of the continent's top club competition. It was held from 7 to 13 June, 2025 in Dubai, the United Arab Emirates for a second consecutive year.

Utsunomiya Brex of the Japan won their first title and they earned the right to play in the 2025 FIBA Intercontinental Cup.

== Qualification ==
The second BCL Asia tournament features the top eight clubs from across the continent. Champions from Japan (B.League), South Korea (KBL), China (CBA), and the Philippines (PBA) as well as the champion and runner-up of the 2024–25 FIBA West Asia Super League (WASL) are set for automatic qualification. The PBA which organizes multiple tournaments per season has the prerogative to select which team to enter. Last edition the PBA decided not to send a team for the tournament.

Two qualifying teams will be decided from the 2025 Basketball Champions League Asia – East (BCL Asia – East).

The following teams qualified to the main tournament. Years in bold denote the team won the competition.

Team	Qualified on	Qualified as	Participations
(Philippines) Meralco Bolts	5 May 2025 (Note: The Philippine Basketball Association typically has three tournaments or conferences per season. The PBA decided to send the winners of the Philippine Cup of the 2023–24 season which concluded on 16 June 2024. The latest concluded conference as per the decision date was the 2024–25 Commissioner's Cup which was won by TNT Tropang Giga on 28 March 2025.)	2024 PBA Philippine Cup champion	1 (2018)
(South Korea) Changwon LG Sakers	17 May 2025	2024–25 KBL champion	Debut
(Lebanon) Al Riyadi	17 May 2025	2024–25 WASL champion	11 (1998, 2008, 2009, 2010, **2011**, 2012, 2016, **2017**, 2018, 2019, **2024**)
(Iran) Tabiat	17 May 2025	2024–25 WASL runner-up	Debut
(China) Zhejiang Lions	20 May 2025	2024–25 CBA champion	Debut
(United Arab Emirates) Shabab Al Ahli	26 May 2025	Host	5 (2001, 2011, 2016, 2017, 2024) (Note: Includes participations of Al Ahli and Al Shabab, which merged to form Shabab Al Ahli in 2017.)
(Japan) Utsunomiya Brex	27 May 2025	2024–25 B1 League champion	Debut
(Mongolia) Ulaanbaatar Xac Broncos	30 May 2025	2025 BCL Asia – East champion	Debut
(Chinese Taipei) Taoyuan Pauian Pilots	30 May 2025	2025 BCL Asia – East runner-up	Debut

== Venues ==
On 21 May 2025, FIBA announced Dubai as the host city of the event for a second year in a row. The group phase will be played at the Sheikh Saeed Bin Maktoum Sports Hall, the same arena for last year's games. The final phase will be held in the Coca-Cola Arena.

== Format ==
The nine teams play in three round-of-robin groups of three, with each playing two games. The top eight teams from overall group phase advance to the final phase, where they play single-elimination games for final classification.

== Draw ==
The group phase draw was held on 31 May 2025 at the UG Palace in Mongolia. The quarter-finals draw was held on 9 June 2025.

Group phase

Pot 1	Pot 2	Pot 3
(Japan) Utsunomiya Brex	(Philippines) Meralco Bolts	(Mongolia) Ulaanbaatar Xac Broncos
(Iran) Tabiat	(China) Zhejiang Lions	(Chinese Taipei) Taoyuan Pauian Pilots
(Lebanon) Al Riyadi	(South Korea) Changwon LG Sakers	(United Arab Emirates) Shabab Al Ahli

Quarter-finals

Pot D	Pot E	Pot F	Pot G
(Lebanon) Al Riyadi	(Mongolia) Ulaanbaatar Xac Broncos	(Chinese Taipei) Taoyuan Pauian Pilots	(Japan) Utsunomiya Brex
(Iran) Tabiat	(United Arab Emirates) Shabab Al Ahli	(Philippines) Meralco Bolts	(China) Zhejiang Lions

== Group phase ==
Note: All times are UAE Standard Time (UTC+4)

=== Group A ===
Pos	Team	Pld	W	L	PF	PA	PD	Pts	Qualification
1	(Iran) Tabiat	2	2	0	177	161	+16	4	Advance to Final phase
2	(Mongolia) Ulaanbaatar Xac Broncos	2	1	1	160	145	+15	3	Advance to Final phase
3	(China) Zhejiang Lions	2	0	2	152	183	−31	2	Advance to Final phase

Source: FIBA
Rules for classification: 1) Tournament points; 2) Head-to-head results; 3) Head-to-head points difference; 4) Head-to-head points scored; 5) Overall points difference 6) Overall points scored; 7) Random draw

7 June
15:00

Boxscore

Ulaanbaatar Xac Broncos (Mongolia)	84–67	(China) Zhejiang Lions
Scoring by quarter: 20–15, 16–19, 20–17, 28–16
Pts: Miller 30; Rebs: Tshimanga 11; Asts: Barsbold, Tolbert 4		Pts: Nunnally 22; Rebs: Knight 7 Asts: Brown 6

Sheikh Saeed Bin Maktoum Sports Hall, Dubai
Attendance: 145
Referees: Harja Jaladri (INA), Preeda Muongmee (THA), Imran Baig (IND)

8 June
15:00

Boxscore

Zhejiang Lions (China)	85–99	(Iran) Tabiat
Scoring by quarter: 20–20, 24–28, 22–27, 19–24
Pts: Brown 28; Rebs: Knight 9 Asts: Xu Z. 6		Pts: Lemon 29; Rebs: Zangeneh 13; Asts: Bost 10

Sheikh Saeed Bin Maktoum Sports Hall, Dubai
Attendance: 300
Referees: Harja Jaladri (INA), Leong Chuen Wing (SGP), Bandar Al-Suwaidi (QAT)

9 June
15:00

Boxscore

Tabiat (Iran)	78–76	(Mongolia) Ulaanbaatar Xac Broncos
Scoring by quarter: 22–22, 26–18, 16–16, 14–20
Pts: Lemon 23; Rebs: Zangeneh, Buva 13; Asts: Bost 9		Pts: Tolbert, Miller 16; Rebs: Tshimanga 12; Asts: Miller 9

Sheikh Saeed Bin Maktoum Sports Hall, Dubai
Referees: Yevgeniy Mikheyev (KAZ), Preeda Muongmee (THA), Imran Baig (IND)

=== Group B ===
Pos	Team	Pld	W	L	PF	PA	PD	Pts	Qualification
1	(United Arab Emirates) Shabab Al Ahli	2	1	1	200	192	+8	3	Advance to Final phase
2	(Philippines) Meralco Bolts	2	1	1	184	187	−3	3	Advance to Final phase
3	(Japan) Utsunomiya Brex	2	1	1	191	196	−5	3	Advance to Final phase

Source: FIBA
Rules for classification: 1) Tournament points; 2) Head-to-head results; 3) Head-to-head points difference; 4) Head-to-head points scored; 5) Overall points difference 6) Overall points scored; 7) Random draw

7 June
18:00

Boxscore

Shabab Al Ahli (United Arab Emirates)	101–87	(Philippines) Meralco Bolts
Scoring by quarter: 35–27, 18–29, 26–18, 22–13
Pts: Washington 40; Rebs: Hawley 8 Asts: Washington 6		Pts: Watson, Varnado 19; Rebs: Egbunu 11; Asts: Banchero 4

Sheikh Saeed Bin Maktoum Sports Hall, Dubai
Attendance: 278
Referees: Yevgeniy Mikheyev (KAZ), Chan Owe Shiong (MAZ), Taha Al-Hashedi (YEM)

8 June
18:00

Boxscore

Meralco Bolts (Philippines)	97–86	(Japan) Utsunomiya Brex
Scoring by quarter: 20–18, 30–20, 27–27, 20–21
Pts: three players 17; Rebs: Egbunu 13; Asts: Varnado 6		Pts: Fotu 20; Rebs: Takeuchi 9 Asts: Newbill 8

Sheikh Saeed Bin Maktoum Sports Hall, Dubai
Attendance: 148
Referees: Wissam Zein (SYR), Taha Al-Hashedi (YEM), Ahmad Suleiman Alyousef (JOR)

9 June
18:00

Boxscore

Utsunomiya Brex (Japan)	105–99	(United Arab Emirates) Shabab Al Ahli
Scoring by quarter: 31–23, 28–31, 26–27, 20–18
Pts: Newbill 22; Rebs: Fotu 14; Asts: Hiejima, Newbill 5		Pts: Washington 40; Rebs: Al-Shabebi 11; Asts: Washington 4

Sheikh Saeed Bin Maktoum Sports Hall, Dubai
Attendance: 49
Referees: Harja Jaladri (INA), Mohammad Taha (JOR), Chan Owe Shiong (MAZ)

=== Group C ===
Pos	Team	Pld	W	L	PF	PA	PD	Pts	Qualification
1	(Lebanon) Al Riyadi	2	2	0	202	158	+44	4	Advance to Final phase
2	(Chinese Taipei) Taoyuan Pauian Pilots	2	1	1	171	172	−1	3	Advance to Final phase
3	(South Korea) Changwon LG Sakers	2	0	2	149	192	−43	2	

Source: FIBA
Rules for classification: 1) Tournament points; 2) Head-to-head results; 3) Head-to-head points difference; 4) Head-to-head points scored; 5) Overall points difference 6) Overall points scored; 7) Random draw

7 June
21:00

Boxscore

Taoyuan Pauian Pilots (Chinese Taipei)	89–73	(South Korea) Changwon LG Sakers
Scoring by quarter: 20–22, 25–12, 21–14, 23–25
Pts: Graham 23; Rebs: Brown 10; Asts: Graham, Pai 5		Pts: Paulicap 15; Rebs: Paulicap 13; Asts: Lee G.D. 6

Sheikh Saeed Bin Maktoum Sports Hall, Dubai
Attendance: 105
Referees: Wissam Zein (SYR), Mohammad Taha (JOR), Leong Chuen Wing (SGP)

8 June
21:00

Boxscore

Changwon LG Sakers (South Korea)	76–103	(Lebanon) Al Riyadi
Scoring by quarter: 24–25, 23–24, 18–25, 11–29
Pts: Paulicap 21; Rebs: Paulicap 14; Asts: Yang 7		Pts: Maker, Arakji 24; Rebs: Maker, Kikanović 8 Asts: Mansour 12

Sheikh Saeed Bin Maktoum Sports Hall, Dubai
Attendance: 1,304
Referees: Yevgeniy Mikheyev (KAZ), Mohammad Taha (JOR), Preeda Muongmee (THA)

9 June
21:00

Boxscore

Al Riyadi (Lebanon)	99–82	(Chinese Taipei) Taoyuan Pauian Pilots
Scoring by quarter: 30–20, 28–17, 23–17, 18–28
Pts: Arakji 33; Rebs: Gyokchyan 11; Asts: Arakji 7		Pts: Brown, Boyd 17; Rebs: Brown 13; Asts: Kuan, Graham 4

Sheikh Saeed Bin Maktoum Sports Hall, Dubai
Attendance: 520
Referees: Wissam Zein (SYR), Taha Al-Hashedi (YEM), Ahmad Suleiman Alyousef (JOR)

== Final phase ==
Note: All times are UAE Standard Time (UTC+4)

Quarterfinals
11 June
(Iran) Tabiat (2OT)	93
(Japan) Utsunomiya Brex	94
11 June
(Philippines) Meralco Bolts	78
(Mongolia) Ulaanbaatar Xac Broncos	83
11 June
(United Arab Emirates) Shabab Al Ahli	92
(Chinese Taipei) Taoyuan Pauian Pilots	88
11 June
(China) Zhejiang Lions	66
(Lebanon) Al Riyadi	102

Semifinals
12 June
(Japan) Utsunomiya Brex	93
(Mongolia) Ulaanbaatar Xac Broncos	71
12 June
(United Arab Emirates) Shabab Al Ahli	78
(Lebanon) Al Riyadi	100

Final
13 June
(Japan) Utsunomiya Brex	94
(Lebanon) Al Riyadi	93
Third place game
13 June
(Mongolia) Ulaanbaatar Xac Broncos	84
(United Arab Emirates) Shabab Al Ahli	79

=== Quarter-finals ===
11 June
12:00

Boxscore

Tabiat (Iran)	93–94 (2OT)	(Japan) Utsunomiya Brex
Scoring by quarter: 21–13, 9–24, 25–17, 21–22, Overtime: 10–10, 7–8
Pts: Buva 27; Rebs: Zangeneh 17; Asts: Zangeneh 7		Pts: Newbill 29; Rebs: Takeuchi 12; Asts: Newbill 10

Coca-Cola Arena, Dubai
Attendance: 300
Referees: Yevgeniy Mikheyev (KAZ), Chan Owe Shiong (MAZ), Leong Chuen Wing (SGP)

11 June
15:00

Boxscore

Meralco Bolts (Philippines)	78–83	(Mongolia) Ulaanbaatar Xac Broncos
Scoring by quarter: 27–20, 15–20, 15–21, 21–22
Pts: Varnado 23; Rebs: Varnado 14; Asts: Watson 7		Pts: Miller 32; Rebs: Tshimanga 9 Asts: Miller 6

Coca-Cola Arena, Dubai
Referees: Wissam Zein (SYR), Mohammad Taha (JOR), Ahmad Suleiman Alyousef (JOR)

11 June
18:00

Boxscore

Shabab Al Ahli (United Arab Emirates)	92–88	(Chinese Taipei) Taoyuan Pauian Pilots
Scoring by quarter: 21–20, 20–18, 24–30, 27–20
Pts: Washington 27; Rebs: Al-Shabebi 9 Asts: Washington 5		Pts: Graham 37; Rebs: Brown 12; Asts: Chen Y., Kuan 3

Coca-Cola Arena, Dubai
Attendance: 120
Referees: Harja Jaladri (INA), Taha Al-Hashedi (YEM), Preeda Muongmee (THA)

11 June
21:00

Boxscore

Zhejiang Lions (China)	66–102	(Lebanon) Al Riyadi
Scoring by quarter: 15–32, 11–19, 16–23, 24–28
Pts: Xu J. 22; Rebs: Knight 8 Asts: Brown 5		Pts: Zeinoun 19; Rebs: Maker 12; Asts: Mansour 10

Coca-Cola Arena, Dubai
Attendance: 500
Referees: Yevgeniy Mikheyev (KAZ), Imran Ali Baig (IND), Bandar Al-Suwaidi (QAT)

=== Semi-finals ===
12 June
17:00

Boxscore

Ulaanbaatar Xac Broncos (Mongolia)	71–93	(Japan) Utsunomiya Brex
Scoring by quarter: 12–33, 26–19, 15–13, 18–28
Pts: Barsbold 24; Rebs: Miller 7 Asts: Miller 4		Pts: Newbill 35; Rebs: Fotu 10; Asts: Newbill 9

Coca-Cola Arena, Dubai
Attendance: 50
Referees: Yevgeniy Mikheyev (KAZ), Harja Jaladri (INA), Preeda Muongmee (THA)

12 June
20:00

Boxscore

Al Riyadi (Lebanon)	100–78	(United Arab Emirates) Shabab Al Ahli
Scoring by quarter: 20–18, 29–22, 24–25, 27–13
Pts: Gyokchyan 24; Rebs: Gyokchyan 11; Asts: Mansour 9		Pts: Washington 30; Rebs: Washington 11; Asts: Washington 6

Coca-Cola Arena, Dubai
Attendance: 657
Referees: Wissam Zein (SYR), Mohammad Taha (JOR), Ahmad Suleiman Alyousef (JOR)

=== Third-place game ===
13 June
17:00

Boxscore

Ulaanbaatar Xac Broncos (Mongolia)	84–79	(United Arab Emirates) Shabab Al Ahli
Scoring by quarter: 17–26, 19–20, 31–18, 17–15
Pts: Azbayar 28; Rebs: Tolbert 11; Asts: Miller 9		Pts: Hawley 22; Rebs: Hawley 20; Asts: Alajmani 4

Coca-Cola Arena, Dubai
Referees: Preeda Muongmee (THA), Taha Al-Hashedi (YEM), Leong Chuen Wing (SGP)

=== Final ===
13 June
20:00

Boxscore

Utsunomiya Brex (Japan)	94–93	(Lebanon) Al Riyadi
Scoring by quarter: 26–29, 24–17, 21–24, 23–23
Pts: Hiejima 30; Rebs: Hiejima 9 Asts: Hiejima, Newbill 5		Pts: Georges-Hunt 24; Rebs: Gyokchyan 13; Asts: Georges-Hunt 8

Coca-Cola Arena, Dubai
Attendance: 3,132
Referees: Yevgeniy Mikheyev (KAZ), Harja Jaladri (INA), Wissam Zein (SYR)

== Final ranking ==
Rank	Team	Record	Qualification
1st place, gold medalist(s)	(Japan) Utsunomiya Brex	4–1	Qualified for the 2025 FIBA Intercontinental Cup
2nd place, silver medalist(s)	(Lebanon) Al Riyadi	4–1	
3rd place, bronze medalist(s)	(Mongolia) Ulaanbaatar Xac Broncos	3–2	
4th	(United Arab Emirates) Shabab Al Ahli	2–3	

== Statistics ==
=== Individual statistic leaders ===
Category	Player	Team(s)	Statistic
Points per game	Deshawndre Washington	Shabab Al Ahli	34.3
Rebounds per game	Arman Zangeneh	Tabiat	14.3
Assists per game	D. J. Newbill	Utsunomiya Brex	7.4
Steals per game	Jordan Tolbert	Ulaanbaatar Xac Broncos	3.0
Blocks per game	Thon Maker	Al Riyadi	2.8
Minutes per game	Arman Zangeneh	Tabiat	42.0
FG%	Wael Arakji	Al Riyadi	67.7%
3P%	Stedmon Lemon	Tabiat	53.8%
FT%	Alec Brown	Taoyuan Pauian Pilots	100.0%

=== Individual game highs ===
Category	Player	Team(s)	Statistic
Points	Deshawndre Washington	Shabab Al Ahli	40
Rebounds	Josh Hawley	Shabab Al Ahli	20
Assists	Ali Mansour	Al Riyadi	12
Steals	Jordan Tolbert	Ulaanbaatar Xac Broncos	5
Blocks	Hayk Gyokchyan	Al Riyadi	4
Three pointers	D. J. Newbill	Utsunomiya Brex	7
Three pointers	Barry Brown Jr.	Zhejiang Lions	7

- Reference：

== Awards ==
The awards were announced after the final on 13 June.

2025 Basketball Champions League Asia

Utsunomiya Brex
1st title

Most Valuable Player
(United States) D. J. Newbill

=== All-Star Five ===
Pos	Player	Club
G	(United States) D. J. Newbill (MVP)	(Japan) Utsunomiya Brex
G	(United States) Ian Miller	(Mongolia) Ulaanbaatar Xac Broncos
F	(New Zealand) Finn Delany	(Japan) Utsunomiya Brex
F	(Lebanon) Hayk Gyokchyan	(Lebanon) Al Riyadi
F	(Australia) Thon Maker	(Lebanon) Al Riyadi
