= 2023–24 FIBA West Asia Super League =

2nd season of the West Asia Super League

2023–24 FIBA WASL season
- League: FIBA West Asia Super League
- Sport: Basketball
- Duration: 13 November 2023 – 1 June 2024
- Teams: 18

Gulf League
- Season champions: Kuwait Club (2nd title)
- Runners-up: (Bahrain) Manama Club

West Asia League
- Season champions: (Lebanon) Al Riyadi (2nd title)
- Runners-up: (Iran) Shahrdari Gorgan

Final Eight
- Venue: Lusail Sports Arena, Doha, Qatar
- Champions: (Lebanon) Al Riyadi (1st title)
- Runners-up: (Lebanon) Sagesse

Seasons
- ← 2022–23 2024–25 →

The 2023–24 FIBA West Asia Super League, also known as the FIBA WASL Season 2, was the second season of the West Asia Super League (WASL), the premier basketball competition for Western Asia organised by the FIBA Asia. The season was initially scheduled to begin on 16 October, but was moved to 13 November following the Gaza war.

Manama were the defending champions, having won the inaugural season, however, they were eliminated in the group phase of the final eight.

Al Riyadi won their first title after defeating Sagesse in the final, and qualified as champions for the 2024 Basketball Champions League Asia, along with third placed Shahrdari Gorgan who were the third placed team.

== Teams ==
The participating teams were officially revealed by FIBA on 7 August 2023.

On 31 October, FIBA announced that Sagesse replaced Dynamo Lebanon as Lebanon's second representative team. On 15 November, FIBA announced that Orthodox Beit Sahour from Palestine would not play in the season, as a consequence of the Gaza war.

- TH: Title holders
- 1st, 2nd, etc.: Ranking in the previous domestic season
- TBD: To be determined

Final Eight
(India) Tamil Nadu (1st)	(Kazakhstan) Astana (1st)		
Group phase
West Asia		Gulf	
(Lebanon) Al Riyadi (1st)	(Syria) Al Wahda (1st)	(Qatar) Al Rayyan (1st)	(Bahrain) Manama (1st)^{TH}
(Lebanon) Sagesse (3rd)	(Syria) Al Ittihad Aleppo (2nd)	(Qatar) Al Shamal (2nd)	(Bahrain) Al Muharraq (2nd)
(Iran) Shahrdari Gorgan (1st)	(Iraq) Al Naft (1st)	Kuwait (1st)	(Saudi Arabia) Al Ahli Jeddah (1st)
	(Iraq) Al Shorta (2nd) (Note: On 6 October 2023, FIBA Asia announced that Iraqi club Al Shorta replaced Jordanian club Al-Ahli Amman.)	(Kuwait) Kazma (2nd)	(United Arab Emirates) Shabab Al Ahli (1st)

== Draw ==
The draw for the Sub-Zone Leagues will be held on 8 August 2023 18:00 (GMT+3) in Le Royal Hotel in Dbayeh, Lebanon. Teams from the same country can not been drawn in the same group. As such, there were three pots for the draw and the remaining teams were allocated in the group that does not contain a team from the same country.

West Asia

Pot 1 Team (Lebanon) Al Riyadi (Iran) Shahrdari Gorgan	Pot 2 Team (Iraq) Al Naft (Jordan) Al-Ahli Amman	Pot 3 Team (Syria) Al Wahda (Palestine) Orthodox Beit Sahour	Allocated based on country Team (Lebanon) Sagesse SC (Syria) Al Ittihad Aleppo

Gulf League

Pot 1 Team Kuwait (Bahrain) Manama	Pot 2 Team (United Arab Emirates) Shabab Al Ahli (Saudi Arabia) Al Ahli Jeddah	Pot 3 Team (Qatar) Al Rayyan	Allocated based on country Team (Qatar) Al Shamal (Bahrain) Al Muharraq (Kuwait) Kazma

== West Asia League ==
=== Group phase ===
==== Group A ====
Pos	Team	Pld	W	L	GF	GA	GD	Pts	Qualification	GOR	SAG	AHL	NAF
1	(Iran) Shahrdari Gorgan	6	6	0	569	403	+166	12	Advance to semi-finals	—	81–68	121–70	100–59
2	(Lebanon) Sagesse	6	4	2	503	457	+46	10	Advance to semi-final qualifiers	74–86	—	101–58	89–82
3	(Syria) Al Ittihad Ahli	6	2	4	418	517	−99	8	Advance to semi-final qualifiers	65–80	72–81	—	79–72
4	(Iraq) Al Naft	6	0	6	420	533	−113	6		67–101	78–90	62–74	—

Source: WASL

==== Group B ====
Pos	Team	Pld	W	L	GF	GA	GD	Pts	Qualification	RIY	SHO	WHD	ORT
1	(Lebanon) Al Riyadi	4	4	0	410	293	+117	8	Advance to semi-finals	—	120–90	79–53	Canc.
2	(Iraq) Al Shorta	4	1	3	246	324	−78	5	Advance to semi-final qualifiers	83–115	—	79–52	Canc.
3	(Syria) Al Wahda	4	1	3	322	361	−39	5	Advance to semi-final qualifiers	67–96	74–70	—	Canc.
4	(Palestine) Orthodox Beit Sahour (D)	0	0	0	0	0	0	0		Canc.	Canc.	Canc.	—

Source: WASL
(D) Disqualified

=== Final phase ===
==== Bracket ====
Qualification to semi-finals
B2	(Iraq) Al Shorta	89
A3	(Syria) Al Ittihad Ahli	73
A2	(Lebanon) Sagesse	89
B3	(Syria) Al Wahda	75

Semi-finals
A1	(Iran) Shahrdari Gorgan	102
B2	(Iraq) Al Shorta	64
B1	(Lebanon) Al Riyadi	95
A2	(Lebanon) Sagesse	92

Finals
A1	(Iran) Shahrdari Gorgan	60
B1	(Lebanon) Al Riyadi	95
Third place series
B2	(Iraq) Al Shorta	66
A2	(Lebanon) Sagesse	116

==== Qualification to semi-finals ====
Team 1	Series	Team 2	Game 1	Game 2	Game 3
Al Shorta (Iraqi Basketball Association)	2–1	(Syrian Basketball Federation) Al Ittihad Ahli	89–73	80–91	76–70
Al Wahda (Syrian Basketball Federation)	0–2	(Lebanese Basketball Federation) Sagesse	75–89	78–99	–

=== Semi-finals ===
The schedule for the semi-finals was confirmed on 21 March 2024.

Team 1	Series	Team 2	Game 1	Game 2	Game 3
Shahrdari Gorgan (Islamic Republic of Iran Basketball Federation)	2–0	(Iraqi Basketball Association) Al Shorta	102–64	88–83	–
Al Riyadi (Lebanese Basketball Federation)	2–1	(Lebanese Basketball Federation) Sagesse	95–92	106–109	86–65

=== Third place game ===
The schedule for the third place game was confirmed on 24 April 2024.

Team 1	Score	Team 2
Al Shorta (Iraqi Basketball Association)	66–116	(Lebanese Basketball Federation) Sagesse

=== Final ===
The schedule for the finals was confirmed on 25 April and 1, 8 May 2024.

Team 1	Series	Team 2	Game 1	Game 2	Game 3
Shahrdari Gorgan (Islamic Republic of Iran Basketball Federation)	1–2	(Lebanese Basketball Federation) Al Riyadi	60–95	95–85	78–100

== Gulf League ==
=== Group phase ===
==== Group A ====
Pos	Team	Pld	W	L	GF	GA	GD	Pts	Qualification	KUW	MUH	RYN	AHJ
1	Kuwait Club	6	4	2	580	524	+56	10	Advance to semi-finals	—	96–101	85–62	91–83
2	(Bahrain) Al Muharraq	6	3	3	509	523	−14	9	Advance to semi-final qualifiers	92–108	—	78–79	94–80
3	(Qatar) Al Rayyan	6	3	3	482	509	−27	9	Advance to semi-final qualifiers	94–90	65–79	—	84–89
4	(Saudi Arabia) Al Ahli Jeddah	6	2	4	520	542	−22	8		92–110	95–65	88–98	—

Source: WASL

==== Group B ====
Pos	Team	Pld	W	L	GF	GA	GD	Pts	Qualification	MNM	KZM	SAH	SML
1	(Bahrain) Manama	6	6	0	575	453	+122	12	Advance to semi-finals	—	84–76	78–74	108–71
2	(Kuwait) Kazma	6	3	3	549	491	+58	9	Advance to semi-final qualifiers	82–102	—	80–85	119–62
3	(United Arab Emirates) Shabab Al Ahli	6	3	3	515	466	+49	9	Advance to semi-final qualifiers	67–73	83–91	—	110–81
4	(Qatar) Al Shamal	6	0	6	435	666	−231	6		83–130	75–101	63–96	—

Source: WASL

=== Final phase ===
==== Bracket ====
Qualification to semifinals
B2	(Kuwait) Kazma	69
A3	(Qatar) Al Rayyan	61
A2	(Bahrain) Al Muharraq	87
B3	(United Arab Emirates) Shabab Al Ahli	97

Semifinals
A1	Kuwait Club	101
B2	(Kuwait) Kazma	87
B1	(Bahrain) Manama	86
A2	(Bahrain) Al Muharraq	78

Finals
A1	Kuwait Club	86
B1	(Bahrain) Manama	74
Third place
B2	(Kuwait) Kazma	93
A2	(Bahrain) Al Muharraq	83

==== Qualification for semi-finals ====
Team 1	Series	Team 2	Game 1	Game 2	Game 3
Al-Rayyan (Qatar Basketball Federation)	0–2	(Kuwait Basketball Association) Kuwait	61–69	77–78 (2OT)	–
Al Muharraq (Bahrain Basketball Association)	2–1	(United Arab Emirates Basketball Association) Shabab Al Ahli	87–97	75–116	89–82

=== Semi-finals ===
The schedule for the semi-finals was confirmed on 21 March 2024.

Team 1	Series	Team 2	Game 1	Game 2	Game 3
Kuwait Club (Kuwait Basketball Association)	2–0	(Kuwait Basketball Association) Kazma	101–87	122–79	–
Manama (Bahrain Basketball Association)	2–0	(Bahrain) Al Muharraq	86–78	98–88	–

=== Third place game ===
The schedule for the third place game was confirmed on 22 April 2024.

Team 1	Score	Team 2
Kazma (Kuwait Basketball Association)	93–83	(Bahrain) Al Muharraq

=== Final ===
The schedule for the finals was confirmed on 23, 29 April and 6 May 2024.

Team 1	Series	Team 2	Game 1	Game 2	Game 3
Kuwait Club (Kuwait Basketball Association)	2–1	(Bahrain Basketball Association) Manama	86–74	73–77	99–92

== Final Eight ==
=== Group phase ===
==== Group A ====
Pos	Team	Pld	W	L	GF	GA	GD	Pts	Qualification	RIY	SAG	AST	MNM
1	(Lebanon) Al Riyadi	3	3	0	273	223	+50	6	Advance to semi-finals	—	95–86	101–69	77–68
2	(Lebanon) Sagesse	3	2	1	284	266	+18	5	Advance to semi-finals	86–95	—	103–89	95–82
3	(Kazakhstan) Astana	3	1	2	280	321	−41	4		69–101	89–103	—	122–117
4	(Bahrain) Manama	3	0	3	267	294	−27	3		68–77	82–95	117–122	—

==== Group B ====
Pos	Team	Pld	W	L	GF	GA	GD	Pts	Qualification	KUW	GOR	KZM	TAM
1	Kuwait Club	3	3	0	284	248	+36	6	Advance to semi-finals	—	85–77	99–95	100–76
2	(Iran) Shahrdari Gorgan	3	2	1	274	255	+19	5	Advance to semi-finals	77–85	—	93–79	104–91
3	(Kuwait) Kazma	3	1	2	276	288	−12	4		95–99	79–93	—	102–96
4	(India) Tamil Nadu	3	0	3	263	306	−43	3		76–100	91–104	96–102	—

=== Final phase ===
Semifinals
31 May
(Lebanese Basketball Federation) Al Riyadi	97
(Islamic Republic of Iran Basketball Federation) Shahrdari Gorgan	81
31 May
(Kuwait Basketball Association) Kuwait Club	72
(Lebanese Basketball Federation) Sagesse	76

Final
1 June
(Lebanese Basketball Federation) Al Riyadi (OT)	100
(Lebanese Basketball Federation) Sagesse	90
Third place game
1 June
(Islamic Republic of Iran Basketball Federation) Shahrdari Gorgan	92
(Kuwait Basketball Association) Kuwait Club	76

==== Semi-finals ====
31 May
15:00

Boxscore

Al Riyadi (Lebanese Basketball Federation)	97–81	(Islamic Republic of Iran Basketball Federation) Shahrdari Gorgan
Scoring by quarter: 32–19, 29–18, 19–21, 17–23
Pts: Gyokchyan 18; Rebs: Kikanović 11; Asts: three players 4		Pts: Monji, Cherry 14; Rebs: Monji 10; Asts: Vahedi, Cherry 4

Lusail Sports Arena, Lusail
Attendance: 3,000
Referees: Harja Jaladri (INA), Mohammad Taha (JOR), Glenn Cornelio (PHI)

31 May
18:00

Boxscore

Kuwait Club (Kuwait Basketball Association)	72–76	(Lebanese Basketball Federation) Sagesse
Scoring by quarter: 17–21, 21–14, 15–20, 19–21
Pts: Young 14; Rebs: Lalanne 13; Asts: Hasan, Georges-Hunt 3		Pts: Rakocevic 22; Rebs: Rakocevic 12; Asts: Gibson 4

Lusail Sports Arena, Lusail
Attendance: 3,000
Referees: Yevgeniy Mikheyev (KAZ), Wissam Zein (SYR), Park Kyoungjin (KOR)

==== Third place game ====
1 June
15:00

Boxscore

Shahrdari Gorgan (Islamic Republic of Iran Basketball Federation)	92–76	(Kuwait Basketball Association) Kuwait Club
Scoring by quarter: 23–24, 27–16, 22–18, 20–18
Pts: Monji 25; Rebs: Kazemi 20; Asts: Cherry 8		Pts: Young 23; Rebs: Lalanne 8 Asts: Georges-Hunt 3

Lusail Sports Arena, Lusail
Attendance: 100
Referees: Rabah Noujaim (LBN), Park Kyoungjin (KOR), Paul Skayem (LBN)

==== Championship game ====
1 June
18:00

Boxscore

Al Riyadi (Lebanese Basketball Federation)	100–90 (OT)	(Lebanese Basketball Federation) Sagesse
Scoring by quarter: 24–11, 13–18, 17–31, 25–19, Overtime: 21–11
Pts: Maker 35; Rebs: Maker 15; Asts: Saoud 8		Pts: Early 25; Rebs: Early, Rakocevic 10; Asts: Ezzedine, Gibson 3

Lusail Sports Arena, Lusail
Attendance: 5,000
Referees: Yevgeniy Mikheyev (KAZ), Harja Jaladri (INA), Wissam Zein (SYR)
