= 2025–26 FIBA West Asia Super League =

4th season of the West Asia Super League

2025–26 FIBA WASL season
- League: FIBA West Asia Super League
- Sport: Basketball
- Duration: 13 October 2025 – TBD
- Teams: 14

Gulf League
- Season champions: No winner

West Asia League
- Season champions: No winner

Final Eight
- Venue: Stade Nouhad Naufal, Zouk Mikael, Lebanon
- Champions: Al Riyadi
- Runners-up: Sagesse SC

Seasons
- ← 2024–25 2026–27 →

The 2025–26 FIBA West Asia Super League, also known as the FIBA WASL Season 4, is the fourth season of the West Asia Super League (WASL), the premier basketball competition for Western Asia organised by FIBA Asia. The season began on 13 October 2025. The season was postponed until September 2026 due to the conflict in Middle East.

Al Riyadi are the defending champions, having won their second consecutive WASL title and third West Asia League championship in the previous season.

== Format changes ==
The 2025–26 season introduced significant changes to the competition format:

- The qualification process for the Final Eight was expanded from six to seven WASL teams, with the addition of one SABA Club Championship champion to complete an eight-team field.
- The West Asia League underwent a major restructure, changing from a double round-robin format to a single group with five teams (reduced from six after Al Difaa Al Jawi's withdrawal). The top four teams advance to the semi-finals, with the no. 1 seed facing the no. 4 seed and nos. 2 and 3 comprising the other bracket.
- The fourth-placed teams from both sub-zone leagues will compete in a play-off for the seventh Final Eight qualification spot.
- BC Astana from Kazakhstan joined the West Asia League as representatives of the Central Asia Basketball Association (CABA).

== Teams ==
The participating teams were officially confirmed by FIBA on 15 September 2025, with the draw taking place on 18 September 2025.

- TH: Title holders
- 1st, 2nd, etc.: Ranking in the previous domestic season

Final Eight
(India) Indian Railways (1st)			
Group phase
West Asia		Gulf	
(Lebanon) Al Riyadi (1st)^{TH}	(Syria) Al Wahda (1st)	(Qatar) Al Arabi (1st)	(Bahrain) Muharraq (1st)
(Lebanon) Sagesse (2nd)	(Kazakhstan) Astana (1st)	(United Arab Emirates) Shabab Al Ahli (1st)	Kuwait (1st)
(Iran) Shahrdari Gorgan (1st)	(Iraq) ~~Al Difaa Al Jawi~~	(Kuwait) Kazma (2nd)	(United Arab Emirates) Sharjah (1st)
		(Saudi Arabia) Al Ittihad Jeddah (1st)	(Saudi Arabia) Al Ula (2nd)

== Draw ==
The draw for the sub-zone leagues was held online on 18 September 2025.

West Asia League

Following the withdrawal of Al Difaa Al Jawi, the West Asia League features five teams competing in a single group format.

Teams
Team
(Lebanon) Al Riyadi
(Iran) Shahrdari Gorgan
(Kazakhstan) Astana
(Lebanon) Sagesse
(Syria) Al Wahda

Gulf League

Group A Team (Saudi Arabia) Al Ittihad Jeddah (Bahrain) Muharraq (Kuwait) Kazma (United Arab Emirates) Shabab Al Ahli	Group B Team (United Arab Emirates) Sharjah Kuwait (Qatar) Al Arabi (Saudi Arabia) Al Ula

== West Asia League ==
The West Asia League features a single round-robin, home-and-away format with five teams. The top four teams qualify for the semi-finals, with the no. 1 seed facing the no. 4 seed and the second and third-placed teams comprising the other bracket. The semi-finals and finals are contested in a best-of-three format, with home court advantage given to the higher-seeded team. The top three teams advance to the Final Eight, while the fourth-placed team will compete in a play-off against the fourth-placed team from the Gulf League for the final Final Eight spot.

The group phase runs from 5 November 2025 to 19 February 2026.

=== Standings ===
Pos	Team	Pld	W	L	GF	GA	GD	Pts	Qualification
1	(Lebanon) Al Riyadi	8	6	2	738	669	+69	14	Advance to Semi-Finals and Final Eight
2	(Kazakhstan) Astana	8	5	3	658	669	−11	13	Advance to Semi-Finals and Final Eight
3	(Iran) Shahrdari Gorgan	7	3	4	545	536	+9	10	Advance to Semi-Finals and Final Eight
4	(Lebanon) Sagesse	7	3	4	621	611	+10	10	Advance to Semi-Finals and Final Eight Play-Off
5	(Syria) Al Wahda	8	2	6	594	671	−77	9	

Updated to match(es) played on 19 February 2026. Source: WASL

== Gulf League ==
=== Group phase ===
The Gulf League group phase ran from 13 October 2025 to 20 January 2026.

==== Group A ====
Pos	Team	Pld	W	L	GF	GA	GD	Pts	Qualification	ITJ	SAH	MUH	KAZ
1	(Saudi Arabia) Al Ittihad Jeddah	6	5	1	527	506	+21	11	Advance to semi-finals	—	85–82	91–87	86–84
2	(United Arab Emirates) Shabab Al Ahli	6	4	2	495	494	+1	10	Advance to semi-final qualifiers	88–94	—	89–87	84–80
3	(Bahrain) Muharraq	6	2	4	514	502	+12	8	Advance to semi-final qualifiers	84–79	83–84	—	92–64
4	(Kuwait) Kazma	6	1	5	469	503	−34	7		81–92	65–68	95–81	—

Source: WASL
Legend: Blue = home team win; Red = away team win.

==== Group B ====
Pos	Team	Pld	W	L	GF	GA	GD	Pts	Qualification	ULA	KUW	ARB	SHJ
1	(Saudi Arabia) Al Ula	6	4	2	582	495	+87	10	Advance to semi-finals	—	88–58	91–79	100–101
2	Kuwait	6	4	2	568	504	+64	10	Advance to semi-final qualifiers	113–108	—	78–83	115–81
3	(Qatar) Al Arabi	6	2	4	461	507	−46	8	Advance to semi-final qualifiers	70–87	58–93	—	82–67
4	(United Arab Emirates) Sharjah	6	2	4	500	605	−105	8		74–108	86–111	91–89	—

Source: WASL
Legend: Blue = home team win; Red = away team win.

=== Final phase ===
==== Qualification for semi-finals ====
Team 1	Series	Team 2	Game 1	Game 2	Game 3
Kuwait	2–0	(Bahrain) Muharraq	107–101	78–69	–
Shabab Al Ahli (United Arab Emirates)	1–2	(Qatar) Al Arabi	107–88	79–103	83–89

== Final Eight ==
The top four teams per league were qualified for the final eight.

=== Qualified teams ===
Bye

- (India) Indian Railways

Gulf League

- (Lebanon) Al Riyadi
- (Kazakhstan) ~~Astana~~
- (Iran) Shahrdari Gorgan
- (Lebanon) Sagesse

West Asia League

- (Qatar) Al Arabi
- (Saudi Arabia) Al Ula
- (Saudi Arabia) Al Ittihad Jeddah
- Kuwait

=== Group phase ===
==== Group A ====
Pos	Team	Pld	W	L	GF	GA	GD	Pts	Qualification
1	(Lebanon) Al Riyadi	3	3	0	274	239	+35	6	Advance to semi-finals
2	Kuwait	3	2	1	293	281	+12	5	Advance to semi-finals
3	(India) Indian Railways	3	1	2	275	295	−20	4	
4	(Saudi Arabia) Al Ittihad Jeddah	3	0	3	258	285	−27	3	

Source: WASL

26 September
17:45

Boxscore

Al Ittihad Jeddah (Saudi Arabia)	97–105	Kuwait
Scoring by quarter: 23–28, 24–25, 27–28, 23–24
Pts: Archibald 34; Rebs: Chism 13; Asts: Archibald 9		Pts: Grant, Onuaku 29; Rebs: Onuaku 12; Asts: Grant 8

Nouhad Nawfal Sports Complex, Zouk Mikael
Referees: Ahmed Ali Yaseen Al-Shuwaili (IRQ), Taha Al-Hashedi (YEM), Preeda Muongmee (THA)

26 September
20:45

Boxscore

Al Riyadi (Lebanon)	104–81	(India) Indian Railways
Scoring by quarter: 24–25, 30–17, 30–25, 20–14
Pts: Williams 28; Rebs: Williams, West 12; Asts: Mansour 9		Pts: Dubar 23; Rebs: Dalger 9 Asts: Sekhon 2

Nouhad Nawfal Sports Complex, Zouk Mikael
Referees: Yevgeniy Mikheyev (KAZ), Ahmad Suleiman Alyousef (JOR), Chan Owe Shiong (MAS)

28 September
17:45

Boxscore

Indian Railways (India)	93–85	(Saudi Arabia) Al Ittihad Jeddah
Scoring by quarter: 28–23, 21–18, 26–19, 18–25
Pts: Early 26; Rebs: Dubar, Singh 11; Asts: Dalger 6		Pts: Archibald 23; Rebs: Chism 19; Asts: Abdelgabar 8

Nouhad Nawfal Sports Complex, Zouk Mikael
Referees: Yevgeniy Mikheyev (KAZ), Ahmad Suleiman Alyousef (JOR), Taha Al-Hashedi (YEM)

28 September
20:45

Boxscore

Kuwait	82–83	(Lebanon) Al Riyadi
Scoring by quarter: 17–15, 18–21, 23–23, 24–24
Pts: Grant 24; Rebs: Onuaku 17; Asts: Grant 9		Pts: Williams 36; Rebs: Gyokchyan 12; Asts: Saoud 7

Nouhad Nawfal Sports Complex, Zouk Mikael
Referees: Ahmed Ali Yaseen Al-Shuwaili (IRQ), Chan Owe Shiong (MAS), Mohammed Ismail Altarawneh (JOR)

30 September
17:45

Boxscore

Kuwait	106–101	(India) Indian Railways
Scoring by quarter: 27–17, 29–21, 24–32, 26–31
Pts: Grant 36; Rebs: Onuaku 14; Asts: Grant 9		Pts: Early 39; Rebs: Singh 11; Asts: Early, Singh 3

Nouhad Nawfal Sports Complex, Zouk Mikael
Referees: Ahmed Ali Yaseen Al-Shuwaili (IRQ), Ahmad Suleiman Alyousef (JOR), Preeda Muongmee (THA)

30 September
20:45

Boxscore

Al Riyadi (Lebanon)	87–76	(Saudi Arabia) Al Ittihad Jeddah
Scoring by quarter: 14–26, 26–25, 27–17, 20–8
Pts: Williams 33; Rebs: Zeinoun 9 Asts: Mansour 10		Pts: Chism 21; Rebs: Chism 11; Asts: Abdelgabar 8

Nouhad Nawfal Sports Complex, Zouk Mikael
Referees: Yevgeniy Mikheyev (KAZ), Mohammed Ismail Altarawneh (JOR), Chan Owe Shiong (MAS)

==== Group B ====
Pos	Team	Pld	W	L	GF	GA	GD	Pts	Qualification
1	(Lebanon) Sagesse	3	3	0	288	271	+17	6	Advance to semi-finals
2	(Saudi Arabia) Al Ula	3	2	1	284	251	+33	5	Advance to semi-finals
3	(Iran) Shahrdari Gorgan	3	1	2	266	278	−12	4	
4	(Qatar) Al Arabi	3	0	3	233	271	−38	3	

Source: WASL

27 September
18:45

Boxscore

Al Ula (Saudi Arabia)	96–72	(Qatar) Al Arabi
Scoring by quarter: 30–10, 23–22, 23–19, 20–21
Pts: Stewart, Creek 22; Rebs: Creek 16; Asts: Stewart 9		Pts: Kikanović 21; Rebs: Muslić 10; Asts: Saad 3

Nouhad Nawfal Sports Complex, Zouk Mikael
Referees: Yevgeniy Mikheyev (KAZ), Taha Al-Hashedi (YEM), Mohammed Ismail Altarawneh (JOR)

27 September
21:45

Boxscore

Shahrdari Gorgan (Iran)	97–103	(Lebanon) Sagesse
Scoring by quarter: 26–28, 28–32, 20–24, 23–19
Pts: Harrison 31; Rebs: Janković 9 Asts: Stevens 6		Pts: Washington 27; Rebs: Washington 10; Asts: Washington 7

Nouhad Nawfal Sports Complex, Zouk Mikael
Referees: Ahmed Ali Yaseen Al-Shuwaili (IRQ), Preeda Muongmee (THA), Ahmad Suleiman Alyousef (JOR)

29 September
17:45

Boxscore

Al Arabi (Qatar)	76–85	(Iran) Shahrdari Gorgan
Scoring by quarter: 18–18, 16–16, 19–22, 23–29
Pts: Rashed 24; Rebs: Kikanović 12; Asts: Saad 6		Pts: Rezaeifar 20; Rebs: Pazirofteh 14; Asts: Stevens 8

Nouhad Nawfal Sports Complex, Zouk Mikael
Referees: Ahmed Ali Yaseen Al-Shuwaili (IRQ), Mohammed Ismail Altarawneh (JOR), Taha Al-Hashedi (YEM)

29 September
20:45

Boxscore

Sagesse (Lebanon)	95–89	(Saudi Arabia) Al Ula
Scoring by quarter: 24–16, 26–28, 23–22, 22–23
Pts: Washington 39; Rebs: Washington 11; Asts: English 5		Pts: Michineau 35; Rebs: Alsuwailem 14; Asts: Creek 6

Nouhad Nawfal Sports Complex, Zouk Mikael
Referees: Yevgeniy Mikheyev (KAZ), Preeda Muongmee (THA), Chan Owe Shiong (MAS)

1 October
17:45

Boxscore

Shahrdari Gorgan (Iran)	84–99	(Saudi Arabia) Al Ula
Scoring by quarter: 18–24, 21–29, 15–21, 30–25
Pts: Stevens 20; Rebs: Pazirofteh 10; Asts: Stevens 7		Pts: Stewart 44; Rebs: Michineau 11; Asts: Michineau 11

Nouhad Nawfal Sports Complex, Zouk Mikael
Referees: Yevgeniy Mikheyev (KAZ), Taha Al-Hashedi (YEM), Ahmad Suleiman Alyousef (JOR)

1 October
20:45

Boxscore

Al Arabi (Qatar)	85–90	(Lebanon) Sagesse
Scoring by quarter: 19–23, 22–17, 20–21, 24–29
Pts: Rashed 24; Rebs: Kikanović 14; Asts: Saad 5		Pts: Khayat 24; Rebs: Washington 14; Asts: Washington 17

Nouhad Nawfal Sports Complex, Zouk Mikael
Referees: Ahmed Ali Yaseen Al-Shuwaili (IRQ), Chan Owe Shiong (MAS), Preeda Muongmee (THA)

=== Final round ===
Semifinals
3 October
(Lebanon) Al Riyadi	82
(Saudi Arabia) Al Ula	78
3 October
(Lebanon) Sagesse	87
Kuwait	74

Final
4 October
(Lebanon) Al Riyadi	75
(Lebanon) Sagesse	67
Third place game
4 October
(Saudi Arabia) Al Ula	93
Kuwait	79

==== Semifinals ====
3 October
17:45

Boxscore

Al Riyadi (Lebanon)	82–78	(Saudi Arabia) Al Ula
Scoring by quarter: 28–14, 19–28, 16–17, 19–19
Pts: Williams 29; Rebs: Williams 11; Asts: Lofton 7		Pts: Stewart 30; Rebs: Alsuwailem 15; Asts: Creek 6

Nouhad Nawfal Sports Complex, Zouk Mikael
Referees: Ahmed Ali Yaseen Al-y (IRQ), Taha Al-Hashedi (YEM), Chan Owe Shiong (MAS)

3 October
20:45

Boxscore

Sagesse (Lebanon)	87–74	Kuwait
Scoring by quarter: 21–18, 26–22, 26–15, 14–19
Pts: English 23; Rebs: Washington 10; Asts: Washington 8		Pts: Grant, Brown 20; Rebs: Onuaku 12; Asts: Grant 5

Nouhad Nawfal Sports Complex, Zouk Mikael
Referees: Yevgeniy Mikheyev (KAZ), Preeda Muongmee (THA), Ahmad Suleiman Alyousef (JOR)

==== Third-place game ====
4 October
17:45

Boxscore

Al Ula (Saudi Arabia)	93–79	Kuwait
Scoring by quarter: 24–24, 29–24, 23–8, 17–23
Pts: Creek 30; Rebs: Alsuwailem 12; Asts: Michineau, Stewart 7		Pts: Onuaku 23; Rebs: Onuaku 7 Asts: Grant 10

Nouhad Nawfal Sports Complex, Zouk Mikael
Referees: Ahmed Ali Yaseen Al-Shuwaili (IRQ), Ahmad Suleiman Alyousef (JOR), Mohammed Ismail Altarawneh (JOR)

==== Final ====
4 October
20:45

Boxscore

Al Riyadi (Lebanon)	75–67	(Lebanon) Sagesse
Scoring by quarter: 26–14, 14–20, 15–11, 20–22
Pts: Lofton 25; Rebs: West 12; Asts: Lofton 4		Pts: Ezzedine 17; Rebs: Washington 11; Asts: English 7

Nouhad Nawfal Sports Complex, Zouk Mikael
Referees: Yevgeniy Mikheyev (KAZ), Preeda Muongmee (THA), Taha Al-Hashedi (YEM)
