= Wael Arakji =

Lebanese basketball player (born 1994)

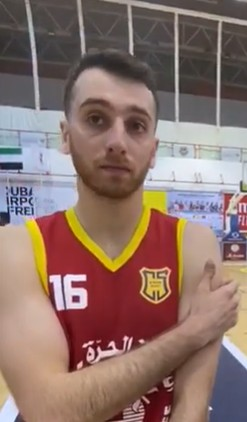
- Arakji with Al Riyadi in 2020

No. 16 – Al Riyadi
- Position: Point guard
- League: Lebanese Basketball League

Personal information
- Born: 4 September 1994 (age 32) Beirut, Lebanon
- Listed height: 1.92 m (6 ft 4 in)
- Listed weight: 90 kg (198 lb)

Career information
- NBA draft: 2015: undrafted
- Playing career: 2012–present

Career history
- 2012–2019: Al Riyadi
- 2018: → Beikong Fly Dragons
- 2020–2021: Al-Shamal
- 2021: US Monastir
- 2021: Al-Jahra
- 2022: Beirut Club
- 2022–2024: Al Riyadi
- 2024: Al-Arabi
- 2024–2025: Dubai Basketball
- 2025: Al Riyadi
- 2025–2026: Al-Ula
- 2026–present: Al Riyadi

Career highlights
- 2× FIBA Asia Champions Cup / BCL Asia champion (2017, 2024); BCL Asia MVP (2024); 2× WASL champion (2024, 2025); WASL MVP (2025); FIBA Asia Cup MVP (2022); FIBA Asia Cup All-Tournament Team (2022); All-BAL First Team (2021); 9× Lebanese League champion (2014–2017, 2019, 2022–2025); Qatari League champion (2020); Tunisian League champion (2021)
Medals
Men's basketball
Representing Lebanon
FIBA Asia Cup
Silver medal – second place	2022 Jakarta
Arab Basketball Championship
Gold medal – first place	2022 Dubai

Wael Arakji (Arabic: وائل عرقجي; born 4 September 1994) is a Lebanese professional basketball player for Al Riyadi of the Lebanese Basketball League. He is nicknamed "the Fearsome" (Arabic: الرهيب, romanized: al-rahib). At the club level, he also played in the Chinese Basketball Association and participated in the NBA Summer League for the Dallas Mavericks in 2019. For the national team, Arakji won the MVP award at the 2022 FIBA Asia Cup, where Lebanon finished runners-up.

== Professional career ==
Born in Beirut, Lebanon, Arakji caught the eye of head coach of Al Riyadi Beirut, Slobodan Subotić, following his performances with Lebanon at the 2012 FIBA Asia Under-18 Championship. During his seven seasons with Al Riyadi in the Lebanese Basketball League, Arakji won seven league titles and the FIBA Asia Champions Cup in 2017. In 2015 he declared for the NBA draft, but was not selected.

On 31 January 2018, Arakji signed with Beikong Fly Dragons of the Chinese Basketball Association after Zaid Abbas was injured. During that five-game stint, he averaged 16.6 points, 4.8 rebounds, 7.2 assists and 1.4 steals. In 2019, he got an opportunity to play for the Dallas Mavericks in the NBA Summer League.

On 20 January 2020, Arakji signed with Nanjing Monkey Kings of the Chinese Basketball Association. On 7 February 2020, Arakji signed with Al-Shamal of the Qatari Basketball League. On 15 July 2020, Arakji re-signed with Al-Shamal. Arakji helped Al-Shamal win the Qatari Basketball League. He started the 2020–21 season with the same club and helped them reach the final of the league averaging 26.4 points, 6.0 rebounds, 5.5 assists and 1.7 steals in 14 games.

On 7 February 2021, Arakji signed with US Monastir of the Championnat National A. Arakji won the Championnat National A with US Monastir, and reached the final of the Basketball Africa League. He was named to the 2021 All-BAL First Team.

On 2 June 2021, Arakji signed with Al-Shamal. On 10 August 2021, Arakji signed with Al-Jahra in Kuwait. On 6 March 2022, Arakji signed with Beirut Club for his return to the Lebanese Basketball League after three years. He helped Beirut win the championship, after defeating his former club Al Riyadi Beirut in the final.

On 25 October 2022, Arakji signed with Al Riyadi. On 15 June 2024, Arakji and Al Riyadi won the 2024 Basketball Champions League Asia, his second continental championship. He had a tournament-high 31 points and 9 assists in the final against Shabab Al Ahli. Arakji was named the league MVP after averaging 21.0 points, 4.0 rebounds and a league-high 8.4 assist per game, while shooting 75.5% from the field and 71.4% from three.

On 18 October 2024, Arakji signed with Al-Arabi of the Qatari Basketball League. On 10 December, Arakji signed with Dubai Basketball of the ABA League. On 8 January 2025, he parted ways with the team, returned to the Al Riyadi.

In the 2024–25 season, Arakji won the FIBA West Asia Super League (WASL) and was named the league's MVP. In July 2025, Arakji along with his Al Riyadi teammate Thon Maker joined Saudi Basketball League side Al-Ula.

== National team career ==
In 2012, Arakji made his debut by helping Lebanon finish in seventh place at the 2012 FIBA Asia Under-18 Championship.

Arakji helped Lebanon win the 2022 Arab Basketball Championship, winning the final against Tunisia 72–69, and was nominated MVP of the tournament. He also finished runner-up of the 2022 FIBA Asia Cup as the tournament's MVP and top scorer, with an average of 26.0 points per game.

He played with the national team in 2023 FIBA World Cup.

== Awards and accomplishments ==
Al Riyadi Beirut

- FIBA Asia Champions Cup: (2017, 2024)
- FIBA West Asia Super League: (2024, 2025)
- 7x Lebanese Basketball League: (2014,2015,2016,2017,2019,2023,2024)

US Monastir

- Championnat National A: 2021

Al-Shamal

- Qatari Basketball League: 2020

Beirut Club

- Lebanese Basketball League: 2022

Lebanon

- Arab Basketball Championship (gold) Gold Medal: (2022)
- FIBA Asia Cup (silver) Silver Medal: 2022

Individual

- FIBA Asia Cup MVP: 2022
- FIBA Asia Cup All-Tournament Team: 2022
- Arab Basketball Championship MVP: 2022
- All-BAL First Team: 2021
- Lebanese Basketball League MVP: 2024
- Basketball Champions League Asia MVP: 2024
- FIBA West Asia Super League MVP: 2024–25

== Career statistics ==
Legend
GP	Games played	MPG	Minutes per game	FG%	Field goal percentage
3P%	3-point field goal percentage	FT%	Free throw percentage	RPG	Rebounds per game
APG	Assists per game	SPG	Steals per game	BPG	Blocks per game
PPG	Points per game	**Bold**	Career high		Led the league

Year	Team	League	GP	MPG	FG%	3P%	FT%	RPG	APG	SPG	BPG	PPG
2012–13	Sporting Al Riyadi Beirut	LBL	21	10.2	.450	.333	.400	1.6	1.8	.6	.0	2.7
2013–14	Sporting Al Riyadi Beirut	LBL	22	9.9	.333	.095	.667	1.0	1.3	.8	.0	1.8
2014–15	Sporting Al Riyadi Beirut	LBL	33	19.8	.532	.286	.806	2.6	2.7	.8	.1	6.9
2015–16	Sporting Al Riyadi Beirut	LBL	35	22.2	.472	.288	.750	2.4	3.2	.8	.1	6.7
2016–17	Sporting Al Riyadi Beirut	LBL	19	25.1	.580	.280	.633	3.8	4.6	1.2	.2	9.8
2017–18	Sporting Al Riyadi Beirut	LBL	26	29.7	.492	.327	.710	4.0	6.3	1.3	.0	13.1
2017–18	Beijing Royal Fighters	CBA	5	34.8	.431	.136	.720	4.8	7.2	1.6	.0	16.6
2018–19	Sporting Al Riyadi Beirut	LBL	25	26.5	.511	.425	.812	3.2	4.4	1.0	.1	12.5
2019–20	Sporting Al Riyadi Beirut	LBL	2	34.1	.360	.200	.000	2.0	4.0	1.0	.0	10.0
2020–21	US Monastir	BAL	6	22.6	.707	.4	0.867	2.6	3.4	1.4	.0	15.0
