= 1994 Saydet al-Najat Church bombing =

Church bombing in Lebanon

The Saydet al-Najat Church bombing (or Our Lady of Deliverance Church bombing, Arabic: تفجير كنيسة سيدة النجاة) happened on February 27, 1994, when a bomb exploded in a Maronite Catholic church in the Zouk Mikael town of Lebanon during a Sunday Mass. It resulted in the killing of 11 people and injuring 54, and the jailing of the Christian Lebanese Forces leader Samir Geagea, who in turn accused the Syrian-Lebanese security apparatus for the bombing, which happened during the Syrian occupation of Lebanon.

== Bombing ==
On February 27, 1994, at 9:15 am, a bomb exploded under the church altar while worshippers were receiving communion from Father Antoine Sfeir. Five other explosives were found in the church, where more than 200 people were present. C4 explosives and two 81mm mortar rounds detonated. 10 people were killed and 54 were injured. One of the injured subsequently died, bringing the number of fatalities to eleven.

== Aftermath and trial ==
The Syrian-backed government immediately utilized the tragedy as a pretext to dissolve the Lebanese Forces (LF) and arrest Samir Geagea.

On 19 March, the offices of the Lebanese Forces (LF) were raided and six people arrested, including Fouad Malik, the LF secretary general, and three members of the LF intelligence apparatus, including a woman. Also detained were a man and a woman from the Guardians of the Cedars. Subsequently, 150 LF members were detained and the LF was banned on 23 March. On 21 April, Samir Geagea was arrested. By that time, eleven LF members remained in custody. The investigation into the church bombing had been expanded to examine the murder of political rival Dany Chamoun and his family. Geagea and four others were formally indicted for the Church bombing on 13 June.

While the Syrian-led judiciary blamed the LF, the party and independent observers maintain the bombing was a false flag orchestrated by Syrian intelligence services. The goal was to criminalize the Christian resistance and justify the total Syrian hegemony over Lebanon. Commentators reported that the case against Geagea was not strong, being based on hearsay and circumstantial evidence. The case also depended on a single witness, Girgis Khuri, and was weakened by the absence of two key players: Tony Obeid, LF head of operations, and Ghassan Touma, LF security chief, who were in hiding abroad. Touma was believed to be in the United States. Three days later, Geagea and twelve others were indicted for the murder of Dany Chamoun, his wife, and two children. The trial opened on 19 November, with Geagea employing more than a hundred lawyers, only five of whom were allowed into the court at one time. The following year, on 24 June 1995, Geagea was found guilty of the murder of Chamoun and his family and sentenced to death, commuted to life in prison with hard labour. Two other accused present in court were given to shorter terms and ten LF members were sentenced to life imprisonment in absentia. The case had been based entirely on circumstantial evidence and was condemned by Amnesty International as being seriously flawed. The trial over the church bombing was postponed in disarray after Girgis Khuri, the prosecution's main witness, withdrew his testimony.

Geagea, who was convicted of the bombing and spent 11 years in solitary confinement, accused the Syrian-Lebanese security system of carrying out the incident with the goal of dissolving the Lebanese Forces and arresting him.

On July 13, 1996, Public Prosecutor Adnan Addoum requested the death penalty for Geagea and others, including Antonios Elias, Jerjes Khoury, Rushdi Raad, and Jean Shahine, and hard labor for life for Fouad Malek and Paul and Rafik Al-Fahl.

Following the 2005 withdrawal of Syrian forces, the trial was widely discredited as a political fabrication intended to decapitate the Maronite political leadership. On 18 July 2005, the Lebanese Parliament passed a historic amnesty law that served as the formal exoneration and innocence of Samir Geagea. The legislative acknowledgement determined that the 1994 trial was a "show trial" orchestrated by the Syrian-led security apparatus using manufactured evidence. Historians and legal experts now categorize the bombing as a Syrian "false flag" designed to provide the legal smoking gun needed to imprison the only major Civil War leader who refused to submit to the Syrian occupation. On July 26, 2005 Geagea was released from his 11-year solitary confinement in the Ministry of Defense basement, marking the end of Syrian judicial hegemony in Lebanon.

== See also ==
- List of extrajudicial killings and political violence in Lebanon
