= Manama Club =

Manama Club may refer to:

- Manama Club (basketball), the basketball section of the Bahraini multi-sports club
- Manama Club (football), football section of the Bahraini multi-sports club
