= BBA Cup =

- Founded: 2019
- First season: 2019–20
- Country: Bahrain
- Confederation: FIBA Asia
- Related competitions: Bahraini Premier League
- Current champions: Al Ettihad (1st title) (2022–23)
- Most championships: Manama Club (2 titles)

The Basketball Bahrain Association Cup, commonly known as the BBA Cup, is the cup competition for men's professional basketball teams in Bahrain. The cup competition was first held in the 2019–20 season, although there has been another Bahraini Cup competition as well.

Manama Club holds the record for most BBA Cup titles, having won two total cups.

== Winners ==
Season	Winners	Score	Runners-up	Venue	Ref.
2019–20	Manama Club	95–85	Riffa	Zain Basketball Arena, Umm Al Hassam	
2020–21	Al Najma	66–48	Manama Club	Zain Basketball Arena, Umm Al Hassam	
2021–22	Manama Club	103–97	Al Hala	Zain Basketball Arena, Umm Al Hassam	
2022–23	Al Ettihad	116–113 (OT)	Manama Club	Zain Basketball Arena, Umm Al Hassam	

== Performance by team ==
Club	Titles	Runners-up	Seasons won	Seasons runner-up
Manama Club	2	2	2019–20, 2021–22	2020–21, 2022–23
Al Najma	1	0	2020–21	
Al Ettihad	1	0	2022–23	
Al Hala	0	1		2021–22
Riffa	0	1		2019–20
