= Bilal Tabbara =

Lebanese basketball player (born 1993)

Bilal Tabbara بلال طبارة
No. 14 – Al Riyadi
- Position: Small forward / power forward
- League: Lebanese Basketball League

Personal information
- Born: May 25, 1993 (age 33) Beirut, Lebanon
- Listed height: 1.98 m (6 ft 6 in)
- Listed weight: 95 kg (209 lb)

Career information
- Playing career: 2012–present

Career history
- 2012–2014: Al Riyadi
- 2014–2015: Champville SC
- 2015–2016: Homenetmen Beirut
- 2016–2017: Tadamon
- 2017–2018: Al Mouttahed Tripoli
- 2018–2019: Hoops Club
- 2019–present: Al Riyadi

Bilal Tabbara (Arabic: بلال طبارة; born 1993) is a Lebanese professional basketball player for Al Riyadi of the Lebanese Basketball League. He started his professional playing career in 2012 and has played with several first division teams including Hoops Club, Champville SC now known as CS Maristes, Al Mouttahed Tripoli, Tadamon Zouk and Homenetmen Beirut. In the 2023 season he broke the record for most points scored by a single player at 61 points. Bilal often plays in the small forward and power forward positions.

== Early life and education ==
Tabbara was born and raised in Beirut, Lebanon. He graduated with a baccalauréat Français from the Carmel Saint Joseph school. He received his Bachelor in Business from the Lebanese American University and a Master's of Arts in International Marketing from Hult International Business School in London.
