= FIBA West Asia Super League =

- Organising body: FIBA Asia
- Founded: 31 March 2022; 4 years ago
- First season: 2022–23
- Conferences: 2
- Number of teams: 16
- Level on pyramid: 1
- Feeder to: Basketball Champions League Asia
- Current champions: (Lebanon) Al Riyadi (3rd title) (2025–26)
- Most championships: (Lebanon) Al Riyadi (3 titles)
- TV partners: YouSport
- Website: Official website
- 2025–26 FIBA West Asia Super League

The FIBA West Asia Super League (WASL) is a regional basketball league organised by FIBA Asia, consisting of clubs from West Asia, India and Kazakhstan. The league was announced in 2022 and started with the inaugural season from December, until June 2023.

There are two zones in the competition: West Asia and the Gulf. The top four teams from each zone compete in the final eight for the title. The champion and runner-up qualify for the Basketball Champions League Asia (BCL).

Al Riyadi is the most successful team in the league's history, having won two titles.

== History ==
On March 31, 2022 FIBA announced the creation of the West Asia Super League. The United Arab Emirates-based company eVulpa was appointed as partner for its commercial rights.

The inaugural season began on 19 December 2022, and ended in May 2023, with a total of eighteen teams playing in the 2022–23 season. The first points in the league were scored by Al Bashaer's Aaron Clyde.

Kuwait SC were the inaugural champions of the Gulf League, while Al Riyadi Beirut won the inaugural West Asia League title. The first-ever Final Eight was hosted in Dubai, and on 17 June 2023, Manama from Bahrain won the inaugural championship.

The following two seasons, in 2024 and 2025, Al Riyadi from Lebanon won the championship.

== Results ==
=== WASL Champions (Final-8) ===
Ed.	Year	Host	First place game			Third place game			Num. teams	Ref.
Ed.	Year	Host	Winners	Score	Runners-up	Third place	Score	Fourth place	Num. teams	Ref.
1	2022–23	(United Arab Emirates); Dubai	(Bahrain); Manama	67–59	Kuwait Club	(Kazakhstan); Astana	94–90	(Lebanon); Al Riyadi Beirut	18	
2	2023–24	(Qatar); Doha	(Lebanon); Al Riyadi	100–90 (OT)	(Lebanon); Sagesse	(Iran); Shahrdari Gorgan	92–76	Kuwait Club	18	
3	2024–25	(Lebanon); Zouk Mikael	(Lebanon); Al Riyadi	104–77	(Iran); Tabiat	(Lebanon); Sagesse	100–86	(United Arab Emirates); Shabab Al Ahli	18	
4	2025–26	(Lebanon); Zouk Mikael	(Lebanon); Al Riyadi	75–67	(Lebanon); Sagesse	(Saudi Arabia); Al Ula	93–79	Kuwait	18	

=== Primary tournaments ===
==== WASL Gulf League ====
Season	Champions	Score	Runners-up	Third place	Fourth place
2022–23	Kuwait Club	2–0	(Bahrain) Manama	(United Arab Emirates) Shabab Al Ahli	(Saudi Arabia) Al Hilal
2023–24	Kuwait Club	2–1	(Bahrain) Manama	(Kuwait) Kazma	(Bahrain) Al Muharraq
2024–25	(United Arab Emirates) Shabab Al Ahli	2–0	(Saudi Arabia) Al Ittihad Jeddah	(Bahrain) Manama	(Kuwait) Al Qadsia
2025–26	Cancelled				

==== WASL West Asia League ====
Season	Champions	Score	Runners-up	Third place	Fourth place
2022–23	(Lebanon) Al Riyadi Beirut	2–0	(Iran) Shahrdari Gorgan	(Lebanon) Beirut Club	(Iran) Zob Ahan Isfahan
2023–24	(Lebanon) Al Riyadi Beirut	2–1	(Iran) Shahrdari Gorgan	(Lebanon) Sagesse	(Iraq) Al Shorta
2024–25	(Lebanon) Al Riyadi Beirut	RR (Note: In the 2024–25 season, there were no finals but a round-robin competition that determined the final places.)	(Iran) Tabiat	(Lebanon) Sagesse	(Iraq) Al-Difaa Al-Jawi
2025–26	Cancelled				

== Records and statistics ==
=== League records ===
Largest win

- +55 by Al Hilal vs. Al Bashaer (103–48) on 6 March 2023

Youngest player to appear in a WASL game

- 17 years-old Hussain Albalooshi (Shabab Al Ahli Basketball) on 6 March 2023 (vs. Al Bashaer)

Most points in a game by a single player

- 46 points by Édgar Sosa (Al Naft) on 9 March 2023 (vs. Al Riyadi Club Beirut)

Most rebounds in a game by a single player

- 20 rebounds by Arsalan Kazemi (Zob Ahan Isfahan) on (vs. Beirut Club)

Most assists in a game by a single player

- 13 assists by Saeed Alajmani (Shabab Al Ahli) on (vs. Kazma)

Most steals in a game by a single player

- 8 steals by Karrar Hamzah (Al Naft) on 16 November 2023 (vs. Al Ittihad Aleppo)

Most blocks in a game by a single player

- 6 blocks by Salah Mejri (Kazma, vs. Shabab Al Ahli)

Highest attendance in a game

- 13,000 people (Al Ittihad Aleppo vs. Sagesse) on 14 December 2023

=== Performances by club ===
Performance in the West Asia Super League by club
Club	Winners	Runners-up	Years won	Years runner-up
(Lebanon) Al Riyadi	3	0	2024, 2025, 2026	—
(Bahrain) Manama	1	0	2023	—
(Lebanon) Sagesse	0	2	—	2024, 2026
Kuwait Club	0	1	—	2023
(Iran) Tabiat	0	1	—	2025

=== Performances by nation ===
Performance in finals by nation
Nation	Winners	Runners-up	Total
Lebanon	3	2	5
Bahrain	1	0	1
Kuwait	0	1	1
Iran	0	1	1

=== Number of participating clubs of the West Asia Super League ===
Updated after the 2025–26 season.

The following is a list of clubs that have played or will be playing in the WASL group stage.

Nation	No.	Clubs	Seasons
Lebanon (3)	4	Al Riyadi	2022–23, 2023–24, 2024–25, 2025–26
Lebanon (3)	3	Sagesse	2023–24, 2024–25, 2025–26
Lebanon (3)	1	Beirut Club	2022–23
Iran (3)	3	Shahrdari Gorgan	2022–23, 2023–24, 2025–26
Iran (3)	1	Zob Ahan Isfahan	2022–23
Iran (3)	1	Tabiat	2024–25
Syria (3)	3	Al Wahda	2023–24, 2024–25, 2025–26
Syria (3)	2	Al Ittihad Aleppo	2022–23, 2023–24
Syria (3)	1	Al Karamah	2022–23
Jordan (2)	1	Orthodox Amman	2022–23
Jordan (2)	1	Al Ahli Amman	2023–24
Jordan (2)	1	Amman United	2024–25
Iraq (2)	2	Al Naft	2022–23, 2023–24
Iraq (2)	1	Al-Difaa Al-Jawi	2024–25
Saudi Arabia (5)	2	Al Ittihad Jeddah	2024–25, 2025–26
Saudi Arabia (5)	1	Al Hilal	2022–23
Saudi Arabia (5)	1	Al Nassr Riyadh	2022–23
Saudi Arabia (5)	1	Al Ahli Jeddah	2023–24
Saudi Arabia (5)	1	Al Ula	2025–26
Kuwait (2)	4	Kuwait Club	2022–23, 2023–24, 2024–25, 2025–26
Kuwait (2)	3	Kazma	2022–23, 2023–24, 2025–26
Kuwait (2)	1	Qadsia	2024–25
United Arab Emirates (2)	4	Shabab Al Ahli	2022–23, 2023–24, 2024–25, 2025–26
United Arab Emirates (2)	1	Sharjah	2025–26
Oman (1)	2	Al Bashaer	2022–23, 2024–25
Kazakhstan (1)	4	Astana	2022–23, 2023–24, 2024–25, 2025–26
Qatar (4)	2	Al Arabi	2024–25, 2025–26
Qatar (4)	1	Al Rayyan	2023–24
Qatar (4)	1	Al Sadd	2022–23
Qatar (4)	1	Al Shamal	2023–24
Bahrain (3)	3	Manama	2022–23, 2023–24, 2024–25
Bahrain (3)	2	Al Muharraq	2023–24, 2025–26
Bahrain (3)	1	Al Ahli Manama	2024–25
India (2)	2	Tamil Nadu	2023–24, 2024–25
India (2)	1	Indian Railways	2025–26

== MVP Award ==
Starting from the 2023–24 season, FIBA announced an annual most valuable player. The inaugural award was given to Thon Maker of Al Riyadi.

- 2023: Mustafa Hussain
- 2024: Thon Maker
- 2025: Wael Arakji

== See also ==
- East Asia Super League
- ASEAN Basketball League
