= Marcus Georges-Hunt =

American basketball player (born 1994)

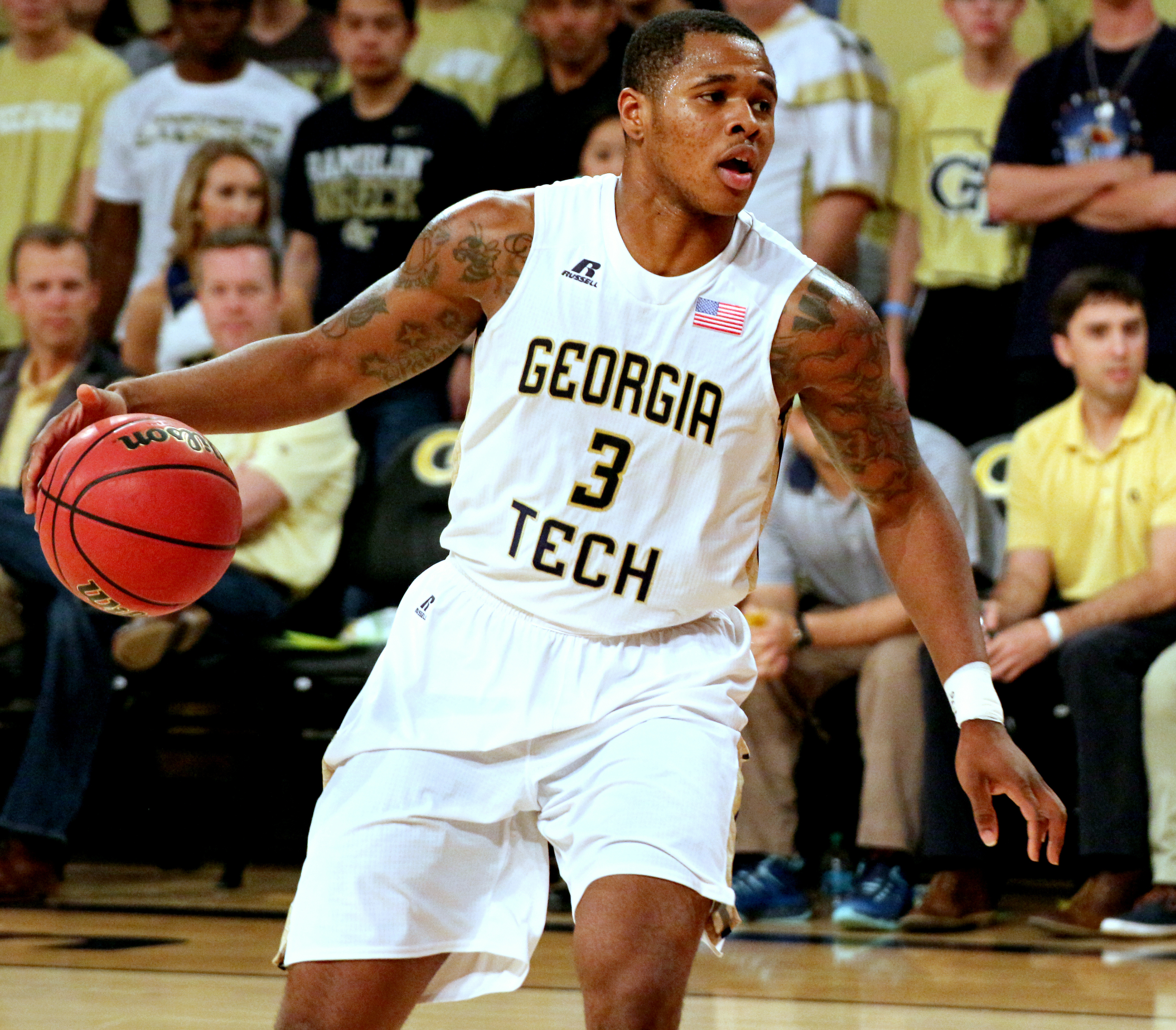
- Georges-Hunt playing for Georgia Tech

No. 94 – Al Riyadi
- Position: Shooting guard / small forward
- League: Lebanese Basketball League

Personal information
- Born: March 28, 1994 (age 32) Miami, Florida, U.S.
- Listed height: 6 ft 6 in (1.98 m)
- Listed weight: 220 lb (100 kg)

Career information
- High school: North Clayton (College Park, Georgia)
- College: Georgia Tech (2012–2016)
- NBA draft: 2016: undrafted
- Playing career: 2016–present

Career history
- 2016–2017: Maine Red Claws
- 2017: Orlando Magic
- 2017–2018: Minnesota Timberwolves
- 2017: →Iowa Wolves
- 2018: Maine Red Claws
- 2019–2020: Guangzhou Loong Lions
- 2020–2021: Sichuan Blue Whales
- 2022: College Park Skyhawks
- 2022: Mets de Guaynabo
- 2022–2024: Kuwait SC
- 2024: Shabab Al Ahli
- 2024–2025: Sichuan Blue Whales
- 2025: Al Riyadi
- 2026: Liaoning Flying Leopards
- 2026: Bursaspor
- 2026–present: Al Riyadi

Career highlights
- BCL Asia Tournament Top Five (2024); WASL champion (2025); Arab Club Basketball Championship winner (2022); Lebanese Basketball League winner (2025); All-NBA D-League Third Team (2017); NBA D-League All-Star (2017); Second-team All-ACC – Coaches (2016); Third-team All-ACC – Media (2016)
- Stats at NBA.com
- Stats at Basketball Reference

Marcus Anthony Georges-Hunt (born March 28, 1994) is an American-U.S. Virgin Islander professional basketball player for Al Riyadi of the Lebanese Basketball League. He played college basketball for Georgia Tech.

== High school career ==
Georges-Hunt attended North Clayton High School under coach Martisse Troup. As a senior, he averaged 24.2 points, 14.3 rebounds and 5.2 assists helping the Eagles to a 21–11 record and a berth in the state semifinals. When he graduated, he was North Clayton's all-time leading scorer with 2,189 points and was considered a 4-star recruit, being ranked No. 59 overall in the ESPN100, and No. 14 among small forwards.

== College career ==
After graduating high school, Georges-Hunt played college basketball for Georgia Tech. He was a starter for the Yellow Jackets all four years, but injured his foot as a junior and missed some time. During his senior season, he led the team to the 2016 National Invitation Tournament after a 12–19 record the year prior. He averaged 16.9 points per game as a senior. Georges-Hunt was named to the Third Team All-Atlantic Coast Conference.

== Professional career ==
=== Maine Red Claws (2016–2017) ===
After going undrafted in the 2016 NBA draft, Georges-Hunt joined the Brooklyn Nets for the 2016 NBA Summer League. In four games for the Nets, he averaged 2.8 points and 1.0 rebounds in 13.2 minutes per game. On September 26, 2016, he signed with the Boston Celtics. However, he was later waived by the Celtics on October 20, 2016, after appearing in two preseason games. On October 31, 2016, he was acquired by the Maine Red Claws of the NBA Development League as an affiliate player of the Celtics.

=== Miami Heat (2017) ===
On February 8, 2017, Georges-Hunt signed a 10-day contract with the Miami Heat to help the team deal with numerous injuries. Miami had to use an NBA hardship exemption in order to sign him as he made their roster stand at 16, being one player over the allowed limited of 15. On February 16, he was assigned to the Sioux Falls Skyforce so he could participate in the NBA Development League All-Star Game. On February 18, after the 10-day contract expired, he was reacquired by the Maine Red Claws.

=== Orlando Magic (2017) ===
On April 3, 2017, Georges-Hunt signed with the Orlando Magic. Following the 2016–17 season, he joined the Magic for the 2017 NBA Summer League, before being waived by the team on July 31, 2017.

=== Minnesota Timberwolves (2017–2018) ===
On August 11, 2017, Georges-Hunt signed with the Minnesota Timberwolves. On November 9, 2017, he was assigned to the Iowa Wolves of the NBA G League. He was recalled by the Timberwolves the next day. On January 20, 2018, he had career highs in points (12) and minutes (29) in the Timberwolves' 115–109 win over the Toronto Raptors. He played a total of 42 games for Minnesota

=== Return to Maine (2018) ===
On October 1, 2018, Georges-Hunt signed with the Boston Celtics to a training camp deal. He was waived by Boston on October 13, 2018. He was signed by the Celtics' G League affiliate, the Maine Red Claws. Georges-Hunt was waived after suffering a season-ending injury on December 9, 2018.

=== College Park Skyhawks (2022) ===
On January 14, 2022, Georges-Hunt signed an NBA G League contract and was then acquired off-waivers by the College Park Skyhawks where he averaged 13.4 points, 5.3 rebounds and 3 assists in 28 games.

=== Mets de Guaynabo (2022) ===
On May 17, 2022, Georges-Hunt signed with Mets de Guaynabo of the Baloncesto Superior Nacional (BSN).

Georges-Hunt joined the Atlanta Hawks for the 2022 NBA Summer League.

=== Kuwait Club (2022–2023) ===
In October 2022, he played with Kuwait in the 2022 Arab Club Basketball Championship. Georges-Hunt helped Kuwait SC win their first-ever Arab championship. On May 15, 2023, Georges-Hunt proved crucial in Kuwait Club's capture of the inaugural WASL Gulf League championship, as he scored a season-high 35 points in the decisive second game of the finals.

=== Shabab Al Ahli (2024) ===
Georges-Hunt helped Shabab Al Ahli finish runners-up in the 2024 Basketball Champions League Asia, and was named to the Tournament Best Five after the lost final.

=== Sichuan Blue Whales (2024-2025) ===
On September 20, 2024, Georges-Hunt signed to the Sichuan Blue Whales. He was the second foreign player in the roster as Edmond Sumner signed there earlier. It was his comeback to the Blue Whales as he played there in 2020–2021.

=== Al Riyadi (2025) ===
On April 1, 2025, Georges-Hunt signed with Al Riyadi of the Lebanese Basketball League. He won the 2024–25 FIBA West Asia Super League with Al Riyadi, and contributed 24 points and 5 rebounds in the championship game.

=== Liaoning Flying Leopards (2026) ===
On 10 January 2026, Georges-Hunt signed with Liaoning Flying Leopards of CBA.

=== Bursaspor (2026–present) ===
On February 25, 2026, he signed with Bursaspor Basketbol of the Basketbol Süper Ligi (BSL).

== NBA career statistics ==
Legend
GP	Games played	GS	Games started	MPG	Minutes per game
FG%	Field goal percentage	3P%	3-point field goal percentage	FT%	Free throw percentage
RPG	Rebounds per game	APG	Assists per game	SPG	Steals per game
BPG	Blocks per game	PPG	Points per game	**Bold**	Career high

=== Regular season ===
Year	Team	GP	GS	MPG	FG%	3P%	FT%	RPG	APG	SPG	BPG	PPG
2016–17	Orlando	5	0	9.6	.286	.500	.900	1.8	0.6	0.2	0.0	2.8
2017–18	Minnesota	42	0	5.3	.438	.267	.619	0.4	0.2	0.1	0.0	1.4
Career		47	0	5.8	.418	.294	.710	0.5	0.2	0.1	0.0	1.6

=== Playoffs ===
Year	Team	GP	GS	MPG	FG%	3P%	FT%	RPG	APG	SPG	BPG	PPG
2018	Minnesota	2	0	1.5	.000	–	–	.5	.0	.0	.0	.0
Career		2	0	1.5	.000	–	–	.5	.0	.0	.0	.0

== Personal life ==
He has three siblings and three children.
