= Thon Maker =

South Sudanese-Australian basketball player (born 1997)

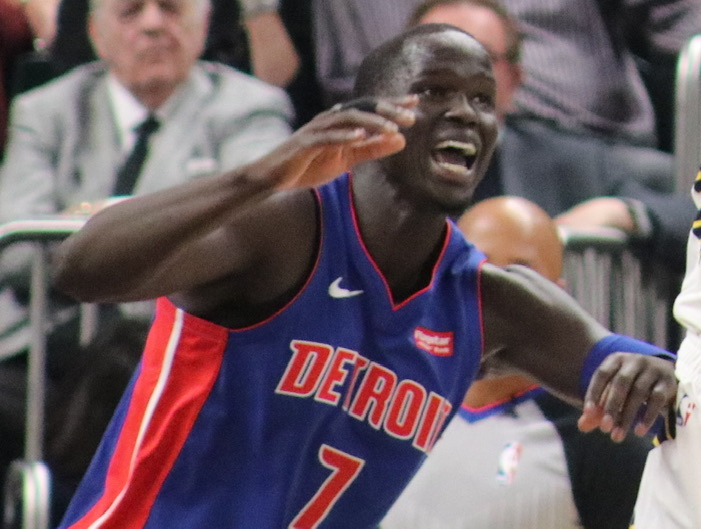
- Maker with the Detroit Pistons in 2019

No. 22 – Hong Kong Bulls
- Position: Center / power forward
- League: NBL

Personal information
- Born: 25 February 1997 (age 29) Wau, Sudan (now South Sudan)
- Listed height: 7 ft 0 in (2.13 m)
- Listed weight: 221 lb (100 kg)

Career information
- High school: Carlisle School (Martinsville, Virginia); Athlete Institute Prep/Orangeville Prep (Orangeville, Ontario)
- NBA draft: 2016: 1st round, 10th overall pick
- Drafted by: Milwaukee Bucks
- Playing career: 2016–present

Career history
- 2016–2019: Milwaukee Bucks
- 2019–2020: Detroit Pistons
- 2020–2021: Cleveland Cavaliers
- 2021: Hapoel Jerusalem
- 2022: Long Island Nets
- 2022–2024: Fujian Sturgeons
- 2024: Al Riyadi
- 2024–2025: Rio Grande Valley Vipers
- 2025: Al Riyadi
- 2025–2026: Al-Ula
- 2026–present: Hong Kong Bulls

Career highlights
- BCL Asia Champion (2024); 2 × BCL Asia Tournament Top Five (2024, 2025); WASL champion (2024); WASL Most Valuable Player (2024); Gatorade Virginia Player of the Year (2014); 2x Lebanese Basketball League Champion; Lebanese Basketball League Finals MVP (2025)
- Stats at NBA.com
- Stats at Basketball Reference
Medals
Men's basketball
Representing Australia
FIBA Asia Cup
Gold medal – first place	2022 Jakarta

Thon Marial Maker (born 25 February 1997) is a South Sudanese-Australian professional basketball player for the Hong Kong Bulls of the Chinese National Basketball League (NBL). He attended high school at Orangeville District Secondary School (Ontario, Canada) and played basketball for Canada's Athlete Institute. He was picked 10th overall in the 2016 NBA draft, and played for three different NBA teams between 2016 and 2021.

== Early life ==
Maker was born in Wau, a city located in what is now South Sudan. His uncle, a local administrator, arranged for Maker, his younger brother, Matur, and his aunt to escape the civil war to Uganda. From there, they were accepted as refugees by Australia; they then moved to Perth, Western Australia when Maker was five years of age and the family eventually settled down.

When he was 14, Maker was discovered playing soccer in the Perth suburb of Mirrabooka, by Edward Smith, an Australian of African-American heritage who helped children from migrant backgrounds receive opportunities they otherwise would not get. Smith had previously helped fellow South Sudanese immigrants Ater Majok and Mathiang Muo, now both professional basketball players. Smith offered his aunt to feed, clothe and educate Maker in Sydney where Maker played basketball for the St. George Basketball Association during 2011. Just before the team's playoffs, Maker and Smith left to attend a talent camp in Texas.

== High school career ==
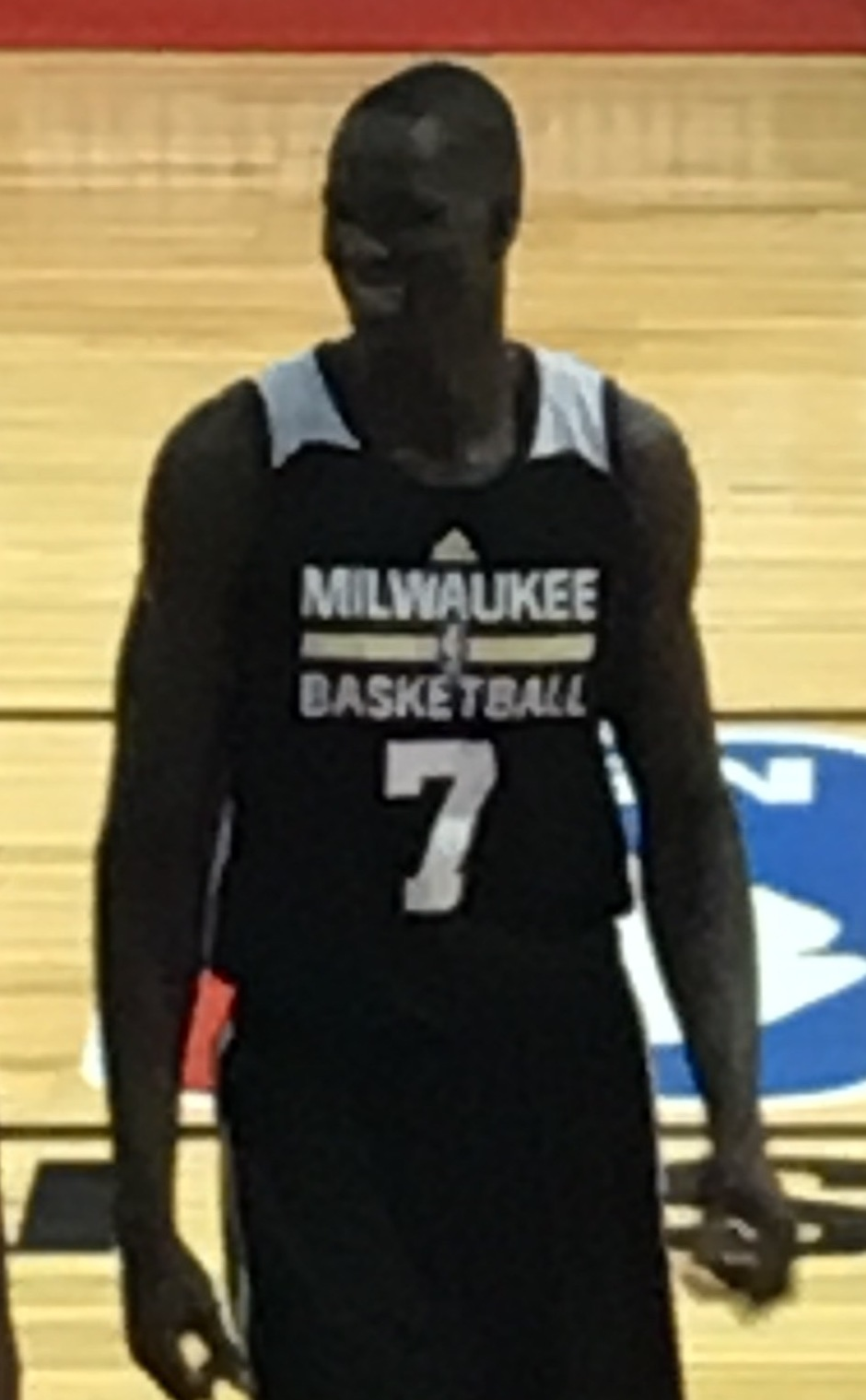
Maker in 2016

Once in the United States, Maker attended two schools in Louisiana, including Metairie Park Country Day School, before finally settling down at Carlisle School in Martinsville, Virginia. During his freshman and sophomore years playing for Carlisle's varsity team, Maker averaged 22.2 points, 13.1 rebounds, 1.9 assists, 1.4 steals and 4.5 blocks over a total of 53 games. As a sophomore, he earned 2013–14 Gatorade Virginia Boys Basketball Player of the Year honours after leading Carlisle to a state championship.

On 5 September 2014, Maker and his brother enrolled at the Athlete Institute in Mono, Ontario where Edward Smith was already an assistant coach. In conjunction with the Athlete Institute, the brothers enrolled at Orangeville District Secondary School in the nearby town of Orangeville. On 29 December 2014, Maker scored 16 points and 9 rebounds in a 79–75 win over Dennis Smith Jr. and Trinity Christian School. On 30 December 2014, Maker scored 24 points and 11 rebounds as his team loss to Harry Giles and Wesleyan Christian Academy in the championship game of the High School OT Holiday Invitational tournament.

On 18 February 2015, Maker announced his decision to reclassify into the 2015 class, which would have made 2014–15 his final year of high school. He later participated in the 2015 Nike Hoop Summit in Portland, Oregon. Playing alongside fellow Australian Ben Simmons in the April 11 game, Maker recorded 10 rebounds, two points and one block as the World Team defeated Team USA, 103–101.

On 18 June 2015, Maker announced his decision to remain in the Class of 2016, and returned to Orangeville Prep for the 2015–16 season. Maker noted how stressful it was working toward entering the Class of 2015, with the issue centred on his workload and the pressure with "trying to get it all done at once". He was being recruited by Arizona State, Florida State, Indiana, Kansas, Kentucky, Notre Dame, St. John's and UNLV. On 21 June 2015, Maker was named MVP at the National Basketball Player's Association Top 100 camp.

On 3 April 2016, Maker declared his intentions to enter the 2016 NBA draft, a decision that required a ruling from the NBA to determine his eligibility. To skip a year of college, Maker had to convince the NBA he graduated from Orangeville Prep in 2015. He successfully did so, proving he graduated from high school in June 2015 but elected to stay for a postgraduate year, fulfilling both the minimum age and one year removed requirements to the NBA's satisfaction. With a successful ruling, Maker became just the second player in more than a decade to make the leap from high school in North America straight to the draft and the first to play in the NBA since the league introduced the "one-and-done" rule for high school students in 2005.

Coming out of high school, Maker was considered a five-star recruit by most basketball recruiting services.

== Professional career ==
=== NBA draft ===
Maker attended the 2016 NBA Draft Combine, where he was measured as the third-tallest player without shoes at 6 ft 11.75 in (2.13 m) and recorded the highest no-step vertical jump (32") of any player over 6 ft 11 in (2.11 m) in NBA Draft Combine history. In the days leading up to the draft, a number of teams ruled themselves out of selecting Maker in the first round over concerns that his age had been misrepresented, as some believed Maker to be between 21 and 23 years of age despite being officially listed as a 19-year-old. Despite those concerns, he was selected with the 10th overall pick in the 2016 draft by the Milwaukee Bucks, becoming the first high school player taken in the first round since the 2005 Collective Bargaining Agreement went into effect.

=== Milwaukee Bucks (2016–2019) ===
During the 2016 NBA Summer League, Maker averaged 14.2 points and 9.6 rebounds in five games for the Bucks and subsequently earned All-NBA Summer League Second Team honours. On 30 July 2016, he signed his rookie scale contract with the Bucks. Maker made his NBA debut on 30 October 2016, entering the game with 95 seconds remaining in the final term of the Bucks' 98–83 loss to the Detroit Pistons; he recorded one rebound. On 21 January 2017, he made his first start for the Bucks and subsequently had six points in 18 minutes in a 109–97 loss to the Miami Heat. On 1 February 2017, he scored a season-high 12 points in a 104–88 loss to the Utah Jazz. On 10 February 2017, in the Bucks' first game since Jabari Parker was ruled out for the rest of the season with an ACL injury, Maker started in Parker's place and recorded seven points and six rebounds in 17 minutes in a 122–114 loss to the Los Angeles Lakers. The following day, he had a second 12-point effort in a 116–100 win over the Indiana Pacers. On 31 March 2017, he scored a career-high 23 points in a 108–105 overtime win over the Detroit Pistons.

On 22 November 2017, Maker scored a season-high 16 points against the Phoenix Suns. On 1 January 2018, he tied his season high with 16 points against the Toronto Raptors. In game 3 of the Bucks' first-round playoff series against the Boston Celtics, Maker scored 14 points and blocked five shots, as the Bucks cut the series deficit to 2–1 with a 116–92 win. He again blocked five shots in game 4, helping the Bucks even the series at 2–2 with a 104–102 win. The Bucks went on to lose the series in seven games.

On 7 January 2019, Maker had a season-high 15 points off the bench in a 114–102 win over the Jazz. By late January, having had a reduced role in 2018–19 under new coach Mike Budenholzer, Maker reportedly requested a trade from the Bucks.

=== Detroit Pistons (2019–2020) ===
On 7 February 2019, Maker was acquired by the Detroit Pistons in a three-team trade involving the Bucks and New Orleans Pelicans. On 22 February, he sank a tiebreaking 3-pointer with 16.7 seconds remaining to lift the Pistons to a 125–122 win over the Atlanta Hawks. It was announced on 19 November 2020 that Pistons general manager Troy Weaver opted to not extend Maker a qualifying offer, allowing him to become a free agent.

=== Cleveland Cavaliers (2020–2021) ===
On 30 November 2020, Maker signed a training camp contract with the Cleveland Cavaliers. He played eight games for the Cavaliers in the 2020–21 season, scoring 30 points and collecting 18 rebounds, before being waived on 13 January 2021.

=== Hapoel Jerusalem (2021) ===
On 25 August 2021, Maker signed a deal with Hapoel Jerusalem of the Israeli Basketball Premier League. He parted ways with the team on 12 December, after averaging 2.8 points and 3.5 rebounds per game.

=== Long Island Nets (2022) ===
On 21 January 2022, Maker was acquired via available player pool by the Long Island Nets.

=== Fujian Sturgeons (2022–2024) ===
On 28 July 2022, Maker signed with the Fujian Sturgeons.

=== Al Riyadi Beirut (2024) ===
On 12 April 2024, Maker signed with Al Riyadi Club Beirut of the Lebanese Basketball League and the FIBA West Asia Super League (WASL). On June 1, he helped Al Riyadi win their second WASL championship, with 35 points and 15 rebounds in the final against Sagesse. Maker was named the inaugural WASL MVP award winner.

On 15 June, Al Riyadi won the Basketball Champions League Asia for the third time, crowning the team as Asian continental champions. Maker was named to the Tournament Top Five.

=== Rio Grande Valley Vipers (2024–2025) ===
On 1 October 2024, Maker signed with the Houston Rockets, but was waived on 14 October. On 27 October, he joined the Rio Grande Valley Vipers.

=== Return to Al Riyadi (2025) ===
Maker returned to Al Riyadi for the 2025 Basketball Champions League Asia, and was named to the All-Star Five once again. Al Riyadi was defeated in the final by Utsunomiya Brex, however.

=== Al-Ula ===
In July 2025, Maker along with his Al Riyadi teammate Wael Arakji joined Saudi Basketball League club Al-Ula.

== National team career ==
In April 2015, Maker declared his intentions to play for the Australian national team despite heavy interest from Basketball Canada—the organisation had considered Maker and his younger brother Matur as potential Canadian players. On 29 June 2018, he made his international debut for Australia in a FIBA World Cup qualifier against Japan. Maker was involved in the Philippines–Australia basketball brawl during the 2019 FIBA Basketball World Cup Asian qualification. As a result, he was suspended for three games.

== Career statistics ==
Legend
GP	Games played	GS	Games started	MPG	Minutes per game
FG%	Field goal percentage	3P%	3-point field goal percentage	FT%	Free throw percentage
RPG	Rebounds per game	APG	Assists per game	SPG	Steals per game
BPG	Blocks per game	PPG	Points per game	**Bold**	Career high

=== NBA ===
==== Regular season ====
Year	Team	GP	GS	MPG	FG%	3P%	FT%	RPG	APG	SPG	BPG	PPG
2016–17	Milwaukee	57	**34**	9.9	.459	**.378**	.653	2.0	.4	.2	.5	4.0
2017–18	Milwaukee	**74**	12	16.7	.411	.298	.699	3.0	.6	**.5**	.7	4.8
2018–19	Milwaukee	35	0	11.7	.440	.333	.541	2.7	.5	.3	.5	4.7
2018–19	Detroit	29	5	**19.4**	.373	.307	.766	**3.7**	**.9**	.4	**1.1**	**5.5**
2019–20	Detroit	60	14	12.9	.482	.344	.664	2.8	.7	.4	.7	4.7
2020–21	Cleveland	8	0	9.5	**.556**	.000	**.909**	2.3	.5	.3	.5	3.8
Career		263	65	13.8	.435	.327	.680	2.8	.6	.4	.7	4.6

==== Playoffs ====
Year	Team	GP	GS	MPG	FG%	3P%	FT%	RPG	APG	SPG	BPG	PPG
2017	Milwaukee	**6**	**6**	19.3	.387	.200	.818	3.2	**2.0**	**.8**	**1.8**	**5.8**
2018	Milwaukee	**6**	2	**21.7**	**.393**	**.300**	.714	**3.8**	.8	.3	**1.8**	5.5
2019	Detroit	4	2	17.3	.269	.000	**.889**	2.3	1.0	0.0	1.0	5.5
Career		16	10	19.7	.353	.190	.815	3.2	1.3	.4	1.6	5.6

== Honours ==
Al Riyadi

- Basketball Champions League Asia: 2024; runners-up: 2025
- FIBA West Asia Super League: 2023–24, 2024–25

Individual awards

- Basketball Champions League Asia All-Star Five: 2024, 2025
- FIBA West Asia Super League Most Valuable Player: 2023–24
- Gatorade Virginia Player of the Year: 2014

== Personal life ==
Maker is an Australian and South Sudanese citizen.

Maker's parents, who descend from the Dinka people, still live in South Sudan and are also both very tall; his father stands 2.03 m (6 ft 8 in) and his mother stands 1.90 m (6 ft 3 in). His brother, Matur, attempted to enter the 2018 NBA draft in a manner similar to Thon before deciding to play internationally instead. Another brother, Maker Maker, plays soccer for Dandenong Thunder SC, after previously playing in Spain and Lithuania, as well as playing for South Melbourne FC's under-20 team. He has a cousin, Makur, who plays basketball in the NBA G League, after having previously played for Howard University. Another cousin, Aliir Aliir, plays in the Australian Football League for Port Adelaide. In March 2018, Maker confirmed he supported the Sydney Swans due to Aliir playing for them at the time, despite previously supporting the two West Australian teams.
