= Elmedin Kikanović =

Bosnian basketball player

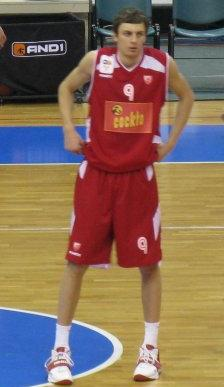
- Kikanović with Crvena zvezda in October 2008

No. 9 – Al-Arabi
- Position: Center
- League: Qatari Basketball League; WASL

Personal information
- Born: September 2, 1988 (age 38) Tuzla, SR Bosnia and Herzegovina, SFR Yugoslavia
- Listed height: 2.11 m (6 ft 11 in)
- Listed weight: 105 kg (231 lb)

Career information
- NBA draft: 2010: undrafted
- Playing career: 2004–present

Career history
- 2004–2007: Sloboda Tuzla
- 2007–2010: Crvena zvezda
- 2011–2015: Enisey
- 2015: SLUC Nancy
- 2015–2017: Alba Berlin
- 2017–2019: Monaco
- 2019–2020: Ormanspor
- 2020: Monaco
- 2020–2021: Ormanspor
- 2021: Kuwait SC
- 2022–2024: Al Riyadi
- 2024: Al-Arabi
- 2024–2025: Al Riyadi
- 2025–present: Al-Arabi

Career highlights
- BCL Asia champion (2024); FIBA BCL Star Lineup Best Team (2018); French League Cup winner (2018); German Cup winner (2016); Dubai International Basketball Championship winner (2024)

Elmedin Kikanović (born September 2, 1988) is a Bosnian professional basketball player for Al-Arabi of the Qatari Basketball League and the FIBA West Asia Super League (WASL). He has also played for the Bosnian national team.

== Professional career ==
Kikanović began his career playing for Sloboda Tuzla. From 2007 until 2010, he played for Crvena zvezda, but he was suspended from play in 2010 due to doping. In June 2011, he signed with the Russian club Yenisey Krasnoyarsk. On May 2, 2015, he joined French club SLUC Nancy midseason. On July 21, 2015, he signed a two-year deal with the German club Alba Berlin.

On July 17, 2017, Kikanović signed with AS Monaco of the LNB Pro A for the 2017–18 season. He won the Leaders Cup with Monaco in 2018. On July 19, 2019, Kikanović joined OGM Ormanspor of the Turkish Basketbol Süper Ligi (BSL). On February 25, 2020, he returned to AS Monaco. On May 21, 2020, he once again returned to OGM Ormanspor.

In July 2021, Kikanovic joined Kuwait SC. On October 9, he scored a game-high 22 points in the final of the 2021 Arab Club Basketball Championship, which Kuwait lost to Al Ahly.

In April 2022, he joined Al Riyadi Club Beirut of the Lebanese Basketball League. He won the 2024 Basketball Champions League Asia with Al Riyadi.

In October 2024, Kikanovic joined Al-Arabi of the Qatari Basketball League.

== National team career ==
Kikanović has also played for the Bosnia and Herzegovina national basketball team. With Bosnia's senior national team, he played at the EuroBasket 2011, EuroBasket 2013 and the EuroBasket 2015.
