= Adnan Addoum =

Lebanese magistrate and politician

Judge Adnan Mohammad Addoum (Arabic: عدنان عضوم, born Beirut, 1941) is a Lebanese Sunni public prosecutor and a pro-Syrian politician, who served as a Minister of Justice in 2004. He was known to have played a key role in pushing the Syrian influence into the Lebanese parliament.

== Biography ==
Born in Msaytbeh, Beirut on January 10, 1941, to a Syrian immigrant father, who was later naturalized, most of his relatives still live in northern Syria. His mother was Lebanese from Hosh Al-Abeed, North Lebanon. His parents owned a store in central district souk (market) which sold imported Syrian food products.

He graduated in law from the Lebanese University in 1965, and then trained as a judge in the Judicial Learning Institution. He quickly rose through the ranks of the judiciary, during which he allegedly worked closely with the Palestinian organizations, before being appointed prosecutor-general in 1995, after the intervention of Ghazi Kanaan the head of the Syrian military intelligence in Lebanon at the time.

In October 2004, he was appointed Minister of Justice in the government of Omar Karami. During that time, he has aggressively prosecuted and imprisoned many Syrian occupation of Lebanon political opposers

Addoum used to participate in meetings of pro-Syrian personalities. Following the assassination of Rafiq Hariri on February 14, 2005, and after the departure of the Syrian troops from Lebanon, the government of Najib Mikati dismisses him from his functions to place a relative of Hariri.

== Wealth ==
Like many high-ranking officials in Lebanon, he has collected significant wealth over the years, worth about $5–6 million.
