= Indian Railways basketball =

Indian Railways
- Nickname: Railways
- League: National Basketball Championship
- Team colors: Blue, orange, white
- Team captain: Manik Ohlan
- Ownership: Railways Sports Promotion Board / Indian Railways
- Championships: ~6 (1968–69, 1993–94, 2005-06, 2009–10, 2010–11, 2025–26)
Home	Away	Third

The Railways men's basketball team is the basketball section representing the Indian Railways in domestic competitions.

== History ==
The Railway Sports Promotion Board itself dates back to 1928.

Indian Railways has been competing in the men's division of the National Basketball Championship as early as 1967–68 when they finished as runners-up in the 18th edition losing to Services. They won the subsequent edition in 1968–69, the 44th in 1993–94. Railways is noted to have produced various players such as Gulam Abbas Moontasir, Surendra Kumar Kataria, Hanuman Singh and Ajmer Singh.

In the 2000s, they won three titles: in 2005-06, 2009-10, and 2010-11.

However it would take three decades for Railway to win a National Basketball Championship title, defeating host Tamil Nadu in 2026. This secured them a berth at the Final 8 of the 2025–26 FIBA West Asia Super League.
