= Qais Al-Shabebi =

Emirati basketball player (born 1991)

Shabab Al Ahli
- Position: Center
- League: UAE National Basketball League

Personal information
- Born: October 31, 1991 (age 35) Dubai
- Listed height: 6 ft 6 in (1.98 m)

Career information
- Playing career: 2016–present

Career history
- 2016–present: Shabab Al Ahli

Qais Omar Al-Shabebi (born 31 October 1991) is an Emirati professional basketball player. He currently plays for Shabab Al Ahli of the UAE National Basketball League. He also played for Petrochimi Bandar Imam BC at Iranian Basketball Super League and also become the best Rebound of 2016 FIBA Asia Champions Cup at this Irania club.

He represented the UAE's national basketball team at the 2017 Arab Nations Cup in Egypt. There, he was one of the tournament's dominant scorers. Overall, he averaged 18 points per game, and finished as the second best scorer, only behind Morocco’s Soufiane Kourdou who achieved 18.6.
