= Al Riyadi Club Beirut =

Lebanese basketball team

Al Riyadi
- Nickname: دولة الرياضي; The Yellow Castle
- Leagues: Lebanese Basketball League; Basketball Champions League Asia
- Founded: 1934; 92 years ago
- History: Al Riyadi Club Beirut (1934–present)
- Arena: Saeb Salam Arena
- Capacity: 2,500
- Location: Manara, Beirut, Lebanon
- Team colours: Yellow, Blue
- Main sponsor: Tecno Mobile
- President: Mazen Tabbara
- Head coach: Ahmad Farran
- Team captain: Amir Saoud
- Championships: 3 Champions League Asia; 3 West Asia Super League; 4 WABA Champions Cup; 5 Arab Club Championship; 39 Lebanese League; 4 Lebanese Cup; 2 Lebanese Supercup
- Retired numbers: 3 (10, 6, 4)
- Website: riyadi.com
Home	Away	Third

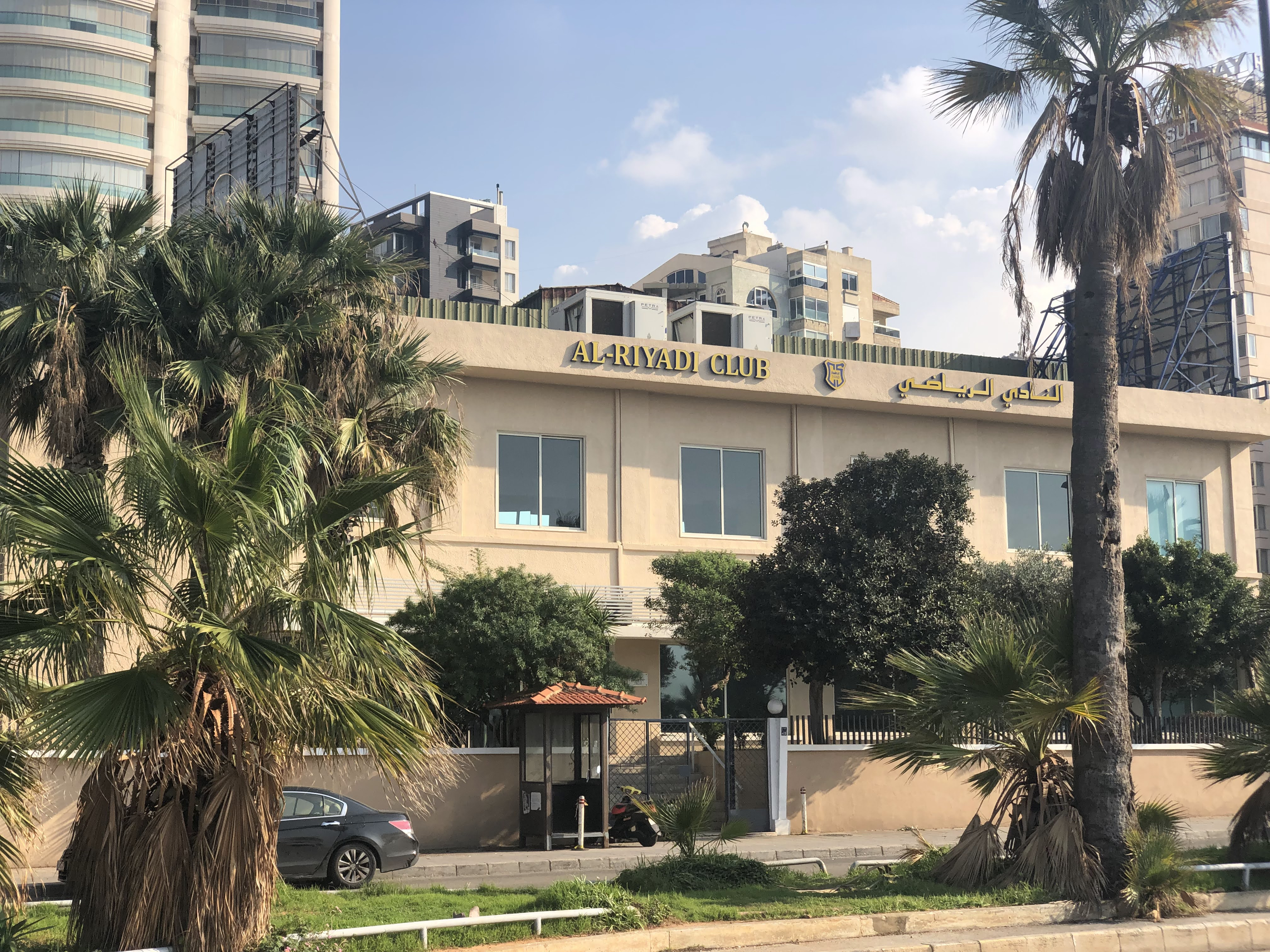
Al Riyadi's office in Beirut, 2022

Al Riyadi Club Beirut (Arabic: نادي الرياضي بيروت, lit. 'Sporting Club Beirut'), commonly known simply as Al Riyadi, is a multi-sports club team based in Manara, a district in Beirut, Lebanon. Founded in 1934, the multi-sports club, which is mainly known for their basketball program, also plays ping-pong, martial arts, and other sports.

Al Riyadi is the most successful basketball team in Lebanese history, and one of the best in Asian basketball. Competing in the Lebanese Basketball League, Al Riyadi is the most decorated Lebanese basketball club, with 38 league titles, a joint-record three Basketball Champions League Asia titles, and five Arab Club Championships. Nicknamed "the Yellow Castle", basketball team plays its home games at the Saeb Salam Arena.

== History ==
Al Riyadi Club was founded in 1934 by Hussein Sejaan, Hassan Ladki, Fouad Zantout, Youssef Shaker, Mustafa Shaker, Zouheir Yatim, Helmi Chehab, and Wafic Nsouli, who formed the first basketball team.

The team played its first game against a foreign team in 1947, when Al Riyadi faced Turkish club Galatasaray, and lost the game 33–39. The game was attended by the first President of Lebanon Bechara El Khoury.

Al Riyadi launched its first women's basketball team in 1965. The club built its own sports arena, the Saeb Salam Arena, in 1991, helped by former President Tammam Salam.

In the 2023–24 season, Al Riyadi secured their 31st Lebanese league championship, their first FIBA West Asia Super League title, and their third Asian continental title by winning the 2024 Basketball Champions League Asia. As champions, they qualified directly for the 2024 FIBA Intercontinental Cup, making them the first Lebanese team to compete in the tournament. At the 2024 FIBA Intercontinental Cup, Al Riyadi finished 4th out of 6 teams with a record of 1 win and 2 losses.

== Arenas and facilities ==
The Saeb Salam Arena was finished in 1991 and holds a capacity for 2,500 people. Al Riyadi played 2 seasons at Nohad Nawfal Stadium while waiting to innovate the Saeb Salam Arena in Manara.

Home arenas
Arena	Tenure
Rawshe	1934–1947
Sanayeh	1947–1954
Rawshe	1954–1991
Saeb Salam Arena	1991–present

== Achievements ==
The following is a list of achievements the club has won.

=== Domestic ===
- Lebanese Basketball League
  - Winners (39): 1951, 1952, 1953, 1954, 1956, 1957, 1959, 1960, 1961, 1962, 1963, 1964, 1965, 1968, 1969, 1970, 1971, 1972, 1973, 1993, 1995, 1997, 2005, 2006, 2007, 2008, 2009, 2010, 2011, 2014, 2015, 2016, 2017, 2019, 2021, 2023, 2024, 2025, 2026
- Lebanese Basketball Cup
  - Winners (4): 2006, 2007, 2008, 2019
- Lebanese Basketball Supercup
  - Winners (2): 2012, 2019

=== International ===
- Basketball Champions League Asia
  - Winners (3): 2011, 2017, 2024
- Arab Club Basketball Championship
  - Winners (5): 2005, 2006, 2007, 2009, 2010
- FIBA West Asia Super League
  - Winners (3): 2023–24, 2024–25, 2025–26
  - West Asia League winners (3): 2022–23, 2023–24, 2024–25
- WABA Champions Cup
  - Winners (4): 1998, 2008, 2011, 2017

== Players ==
=== Retired numbers ===
Al Riyadi retired numbers
N°	Player	Position	Tenure	Ceremony date
4	Jean Abdelnour	SF	2009–2023	13 December 2023
6	Ali Mahmoud	PG	2004–2016, 2017–2019, 2026–present	
10	Ismail Ahmad	C	2000–01, 2004–17, 2018–20, 2022–present	

=== Current roster ===
Note: Flags indicate national team eligibility at FIBA-sanctioned events. Players may hold other non-FIBA nationalities not displayed.

Al Riyadi Club Beirut roster
Players
Coaches

Pos.	No.	Nat.	Name	Ht.	Age
F/C	0	(United States)	West, Nick	2.10 m (6 ft 11 in)	32 – 27 July 1994
C	1	(Egypt) (Lebanon)	Ahmad, Ismail	2.05 m (6 ft 9 in)	50 – 23 September 1976
G/F	2	(United States)	Buford, Perrin	1.98 m (6 ft 6 in)	32 – 25 January 1994
SG	3	(United States)	Williams, Donovan	1.98 m (6 ft 6 in)	25 – 6 September 2001
SG	5	(Lebanon)	Saoud, Amir	1.87 m (6 ft 2 in)	35 – 18 January 1991
PG	6	(Lebanon)	Mahmoud, Ali	1.84 m (6 ft 0 in)	43 – 28 May 1983
SG	7	(Lebanon)	Zeinoun, Karim	1.88 m (6 ft 2 in)	27 – 16 June 1999
PG	10	(Lebanon)	Mansour, Ali	1.85 m (6 ft 1 in)	28 – 1 January 1998
F/C	12	(Lebanon) (Australia)	Rabay, Naim	2.06 m (6 ft 9 in)	29 – 28 October 1997
G/F	13	(Lebanon)	Soubra, Omar	1.83 m (6 ft 0 in)	19 – 7 May 2007
F	14	(Lebanon)	Tabbara, Bilal	1.98 m (6 ft 6 in)	33 – 25 May 1993
G	16	(Lebanon)	Arakji, Wael	1.92 m (6 ft 4 in)	32 – 4 September 1994
PF	24	(Lebanon) (Armenia)	Gyokchyan, Hayk	2.03 m (6 ft 8 in)	36 – 11 December 1989

Head coach

- (Lebanon) Ahmad Farran

Assistant coach(es)

- (Lebanon) Ahmad Yamout
- (Lebanon) Rana Bazazzo

Legend

- (C) Team captain
- Injured

- Roster
Updated: 30 October 2026

=== Depth chart ===
Pos.	Starting 5	Bench 1	Bench 2
C	Nick West	Ismail Ahmad	Naim Rabay
PF	Hayk Gyokchyan	Bilal Tabbara	Marcus Georges-Hunt
SF	Perrin Buford	Amir Saoud	Omar Soubra
SG	Donovan Williams	Wael Arakji	Karim Abou Nasr
PG	Karim Zeinoun	Ali Mansour	Ali Mahmoud

=== Notable players ===
Note: Flags indicate national team eligibility at FIBA-sanctioned events. Players may hold other non-FIBA nationalities not displayed.

Criteria

To appear in this section a player must have either:

- Set a club record or won an individual award while at the club
- Played at least one official international match for their national team at any time
- Played at least one official NBA match at any time.

- (Lebanon) Jean Abdelnour
- (Egypt) Ismail Ahmad
- (Croatia) / (Germany) Dalibor Bagarić
- (United States) Benoit Benjamin
- (United States) Rodney Buford
- (United States) Tony Dawson
- (United States) / (Montenegro) Quincy Douby
- (Lebanon) Fadi El Khatib
- (United States) Andre Emmett
- (United States) / (Lebanon) Matt Freije
- (United States) Dion Glover
- (United States) Donté Greene
- (United States) Manny Harris
- (United States) Mike Harris
- (United States) Rick Hughes
- (United States) Orlando Johnson
- (United States) Ricky Ledo
- (United States) Zach Lofton
- (Canada) / (Lebanon) Ali Mahmoud
- (Australia) / (South Sudan) Thon Maker
- (United States) Randolph Morris
- (United States) Kevin Murphy
- (United States) Lee Nailon
- (Nigeria) Julius Nwosu
- (United States) / (Nigeria) Daniel Ochefu
- (Bosnia and Herzegovina) Aleksandar Radojević
- (Australia) / (South Sudan) Duop Reath
- (United States) Jamal Robinson
- (United States) Jonathon Simmons
- (United States) Willie Warren
- (United States) Loren Woods

== See also ==
- Lebanon men's national basketball team
