= Zouk Mikael =

Zouk Mikael ذوق مكايل Zuq Mikha'il
- Municipality
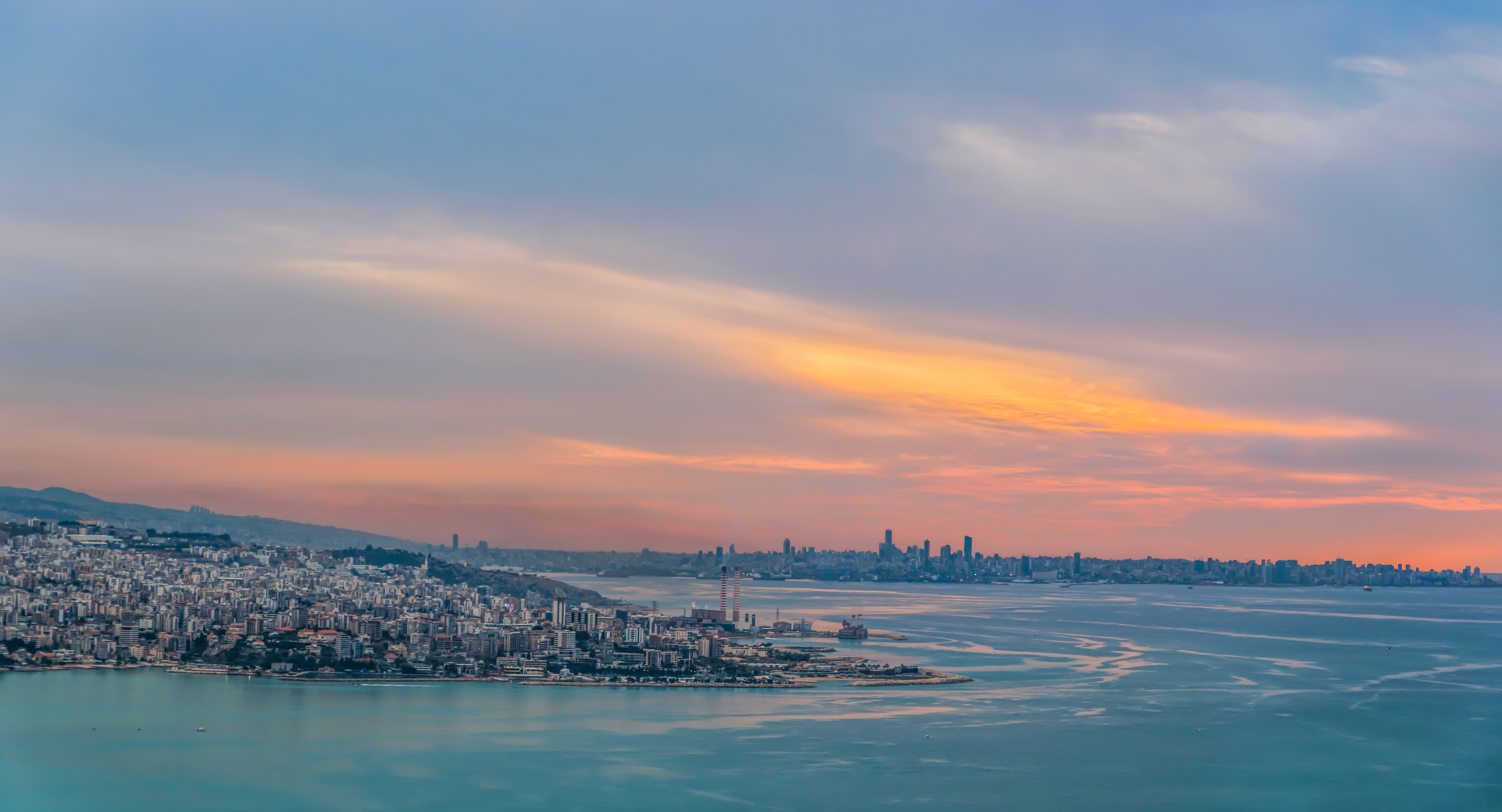
- Zouk Mikael and Beirut from Adma

- Location within Lebanon
- Coordinates: 33°58′18″N 35°36′58″E
- Country: Lebanon
- Governorate: Keserwan-Jbeil
- District: Keserwan

Government
  - Head of Municipality: Elias Ayoub Beainou

Area
  - Total: 3.08 km^{2} (1.19 sq mi)
- Elevation: 70 m (230 ft)
- Time zone: UTC+2 (EET)
  - Summer (DST): UTC+3 (EEST)
- Dialing code: +961

Zouk Mikael (Levantine Arabic: ذوق مكايل, romanized: Zūq Mikāyel, also spelled Zuq Mikha'il or Zouk Mkayel) is a town and municipality in the Keserwan District of the Keserwan-Jbeil Governorate in Lebanon. Its inhabitants are predominantly Melkite and Maronite Catholics.

The town is well known for its Ottoman-era souk (open-air market), a pedestrian market with arcades and shops cafés. It is also home to several monasteries and historic churches, such as the Saint George Church, the open-air Roman-era amphitheatre, which hosts live summer concerts. In 1999, the UNESCO declared Zouk Mikael a "City of Peace".

== History ==
In 1838, Eli Smith noted Zuk Mekayil as a village located in Aklim el-Kesrawan, Northeast of Beirut; the chief seat of the Maronites.

On 27 February 1994 an IED exploded inside the Maronite Notre Dame de La Deliverance Church killing ten worshippers and wounding 60.

== Sports ==
Zouk Mikael is known as the Lebanese city of basketball, as it has the Stade Nouhad Naufal which was completed in 2015. It hosted the 2017 FIBA Asia Cup where the Lebanon national team reached the quarter-finals.

== See also ==
- Saydet al-Najat Church Explosion (Lebanon, 1994)

== Twin towns ==
- Eu, France (2003)
- Rueil-Malmaison, France (2009)

== Bibliography ==
- Robinson, E.; Smith, E. (1841). Biblical Researches in Palestine, Mount Sinai and Arabia Petraea: A Journal of Travels in the year 1838. Vol. 3. Boston: Crocker & Brewster.
