= Bahraini Premier League (basketball) =

- Organising body: Bahrain Basketball Association (BBA)
- Founded: 1974
- First season: 1974–75
- Country: Bahrain
- Confederation: FIBA Asia (Asia)
- Number of teams: 11
- Level on pyramid: 1
- Feeder to: Basketball Champions League Asia; FIBA West Asia Super League; Arab Club Basketball Championship
- Domestic cup: BBA Cup
- Supercup: BBA Super Cup
- Current champions: Al-Muharraq Club (5th title) (2025–26)
- Most championships: Manama Club (25 titles)

The Bahraini Premier League, also known as the Zain Basketball League, is a professional basketball league in Bahrain. The league consists of 11 teams.

Manama Club is the most decorated team in league history, having won 25 titles including for five consecutive seasons, from 2012–13 to 2017–18. Al-Ahli ranks second with 20 national championships.

== Teams ==
=== Current teams ===
- Manama Club
- Al-Bahrain
- Al-Hala
- Al-Ittihad
- Al-Ahli
- Al-Muharraq
- Al-Najma
- Al-Nweidrat
- Isa Town
- Samaheej
- Sitra Club

=== Former teams ===
- Al-Riffa
- Al-Hidd

== Champions ==
- 2025–26 Al-Muharraq
- 2024–25 Al-Muharraq
- 2023–24 Manama
- 2022–23 Manama
- 2021–22 Manama
- 2020–21 Al-Ahli
- 2019–20 Al-Ahli
- 2018–19 Al-Muharraq
- 2017–18 Manama
- 2016–17 Manama
- 2015–16 Manama
- 2013/2014 Manama
- 2012/2013 Manama
- 2011/2012 Al-Muharraq
- 2010/2011 Al-Hala
- 2009/2010 Al-Ahli
- 2008/2009 Al-Ahli
- 2007/2008 Al-Muharraq
- 2006/2007 Al-Ahli
- 2005/2006 Manama
- 2004/2005 Manama
- 2003/2004 Manama
- 2002/2003 Manama
- 2001/2002 Manama
- 2000/2001 Manama
- 1999/2000 Manama
- 1998/1999 Manama
- 1997/1998 Manama
- 1996/1997 Manama
- 1995/1996 Al-Hala
- 1994/1995 Manama
- 1993/1994 Al-Hala
- 1992/1993 Manama
- 1991/1992 Manama
- 1990/1991 Manama
- 1989/1990 Manama
- 1988/1989 Manama
- 1987/1988 Al-Ahli
- 1986/1987 Al-Ahli
- 1985/1986 Al-Ahli
- 1984/1985 Al-Ahli
- 1983/1984 Al-Ahli
- 1982/1983 Al-Ahli
- 1981/1982 Al-Ahli
- 1980/1981 Al-Ahli
- 1979/1980 Al-Ahli
- 1978/1979 Al-Ahli
- 1977/1978 Manama
- 1976/1977 Al-Ahli
- 1975/1976 Al-Ahli
- 1974/1975 Al-Ahli

== Finals ==
Season	Champions	Runners-up	Finals score	Ref.
2025–26	Al-Muharraq (5)	Manama	3–1	
2024–25	Al-Muharraq (4)	Al-Ahli	3–2	
2023–24	Manama (25)	Al-Ahli	3–1	
2022–23	Manama (24)	Al-Muharraq	3–0	
2021–22	Manama (23)	Al-Muharraq	2–1	
2020–21	Al-Ahli (20)	Manama	2–0	

== Performance by club ==
Four teams have won the Bahraini Premier League thus far, as Manama Club (24), Al-Ahli (20), Al-Muharraq (5) and Al-Hala (3) have won every title since the league's inception in 1974.

Club	Wins	Last title
Manama Club	25	2024
Al-Ahli	20	2021
Al-Muharraq	5	2026
Al-Hala	3	2011
