= UAE National Basketball League =

National sporting organization

- Sport: Basketball
- Founded: 2013
- No. of teams: 7
- Country: United Arab Emirates
- Confederation: FIBA Asia (Asia)
- Most recent champion: Shabab Al Ahli (9th title)
- Most titles: Shabab Al Ahli (9 titles)
- Feeder to: Basketball Champions League Asia; FIBA West Asia Super League; Arab Club Basketball Championship
- Level on pyramid: 1

The UAE National Basketball League is the top professional basketball league in the United Arab Emirates.

The league was founded in 2013 and features 7 teams. The most decorated team in the league is Shabab Al Ahli who have won eight of the nine championships thus far.

== Current clubs ==
Team	City
Al Bataeh	Al Bataeh
Al Nasr	Dubai
Al Wasl	Dubai
Al Wahda	Abu Dhabi
Al Dhafra	Abu Dhabi
Shabab Al Ahli	Dubai
Sharjah	Sharjah

Teams	Win	Loss	Total	Championships	Runners up
Shabab Al Ahli	9	1	10	2014, 2015, 2016, 2017, 2018, 2019, 2021, 2022, 2023	2020
Sharjah	1	4	5	2020	2016, 2017, 2021, 2022
Al Nasr	0	3	3		2018, 2019, 2023
Al Wasl	0	2	2		2014, 2015
