= Manama Club (basketball) =

Manama
- League: Bahraini Premier League; WASL
- Founded: 1946
- History: Manama Club (1946–present)
- Arena: BBA Arena
- Location: Manama, Bahrain
- Team colors: Blue, red and white
- Head coach: Linos Gavriel
- Championships: 1 West Asia Super League; 25 Bahraini League; 21 Bahraini Cups; 5 Bahraini Super Cups

Manama Club, also known as simply Manama or Al Manama, is a Bahraini professional basketball team based in Manama. They play in the Bahraini Premier League and are the most decorated team in national basketball history, having won a record 25 championships, 21 Cup titles, and 5 Super Cup titles. Currently, Manama also plays in the West Asia Super League (WASL), which they won in 2023.

Manama plays in the BBA Arena, which is also known as the Zain Basketball Arena.

In the 2022–23 season, Manama played in the inaugural West Asia Super League under the guidance of coach Linos Gavriel. On 17 June 2023, they won the WASL championship after they defeated Kuwait Club in the final in Dubai. Because they also won the Premier League and Cup, they won their first treble. As the champions of Western Asia, Manama was invited for the 2023 FIBA Intercontinental Cup in Singapore.

== Honours ==
=== Domestic ===
Bahraini Premier League

- Champions (25): 1977–78, 1988-1989, 1989–90, 1990–91, 1991–92, 1992–93, 1994–95, 1996–97, 1997–98, 1998–99, 1999–2000, 2000–01, 2001–02, 2002–03, 2003–04, 2004–05, 2005–06, 2012–13, 2013–14, 2015–16, 2016–17, 2017–18, 2021–22, 2022–23, 2023–24

Bahraini Cup

- Champions (9): 2005, 2009, 2011, 2015, 2018, 2020, 2022, 2023, 2024

Bahraini Super Cup

- Champions (6): 2011, 2014, 2018, 2019, 2023, 2024

=== International ===
West Asia Super League

- Champions (1): 2022–23

FIBA Asia Champions Cup

- Third place (1): 2000

== Players ==
=== Current roster ===
Note: Flags indicate national team eligibility at FIBA-sanctioned events. Players may hold other non-FIBA nationalities not displayed.

Manama Club roster
Players
Coaches

Pos.	No.	Nat.	Name	Ht.
G	1	(Bahrain)	Mohamed Buallay	1.90 m (6 ft 3 in)
PG	2	(Bahrain)	Mujtaba Mahmood	1.75 m (5 ft 9 in)
PG	3	(Bahrain)	Ahmed Haji	1.75 m (5 ft 9 in)
PG	5	(Bahrain)	Emran Hasan	1.80 m (5 ft 11 in)
G/F	14	(Bahrain)	Hasan Nowrooz (C)	1.85 m (6 ft 1 in)
PF	15	(Bahrain)	Subah Azzam	1.90 m (6 ft 3 in)
G	17	(Bahrain)	Ali Jaber Kadhem	1.85 m (6 ft 1 in)
G	73	(Bahrain)	Mustafa Rashed (Loan)	1.77 m (5 ft 10 in)

Head coach

- (Bahrain) Salman Ramadan

Assistant coach(es)

- (Cyprus) Alexandros Lekisvili

Legend

- (C) Team captain
- Injured

=== Notable players ===
The following ormer National Basketball Association (NBA) players have played for Manama Club.

- (United States) Josh Boone (2014–2015)
- (United States) Devin Ebanks (2021–2022)
- (United States) Jordan Crawford (2022–2023)
- (United States) Jerai Grant (2020)
- (United States) Davion Berry (2022–2023)
- (United States) Austin Daye (2016)
- (United States) D. J. Stephens (2019)

== Head coaches ==
- (United States) Sam Vincent (2014–2016)
- (Serbia) Miodrag Perišić (2016–2017)
- (Spain) Josep Clarós (2016–2017)
- (Cyprus) Linos Gavriel (2021–2022; 2023–present)
