= Shabab Al Ahli Club (basketball) =

Shabab Al Ahli
- Nickname: Al Fursan Al Humur (The Red Knights)
- League: UAE National Basketball League; West Asia Super League
- Founded: 1958; 68 years ago (as Al Shabab); 2012; 14 years ago
- Arena: Sheikh Saeed bin Maktoum Sports Hall
- Location: Dubai, United Arab Emirates
- Team colors: Red, green, gold
- Main sponsor: Dubai Silicon Oasis Authority
- Head coach: Miodrag Perišić
- Ownership: Hamdan Al Maktoum
- Championships: 9
Home	Away

Shabab Al Ahli Club is an Emirati professional basketball team located in Dubai. The team has competed in the UAE National Basketball League, as well as the West Asia Super League (WASL).

Nicknamed Al Fursan Al Humur ("The Red Knights"), they finished as runners-up in the Basketball Champions League Asia in 2024.

== Honours ==
- UAE National League
  - Champions (9): 2014, 2015, 2016, 2017, 2018, 2019, 2021, 2022, 2023
- Basketball Champions League Asia
  - Runners-up (1): 2024

== Players ==
Note: Flags indicate national team eligibility at FIBA-sanctioned events. Players may hold other non-FIBA nationalities not displayed.

Shabab Al Ahli roster
Players
Coaches

Pos.	No.	Nat.	Name	Ht.
G	0	(United Arab Emirates)	Hamad Balabed	1.83 m (6 ft 0 in)
C	2	(United Arab Emirates)	Ahmed Albreiki	2.00 m (6 ft 7 in)
F	3	(United Arab Emirates)	Hamid Albreiki	1.90 m (6 ft 3 in)
G	4	(United States)	Brandon Triche	1.93 m (6 ft 4 in)
C	7	(United States)	Nick West	2.11 m (6 ft 11 in)
F	8	(Bosnia and Herzegovina)	Milan Milošević	2.06 m (6 ft 9 in)
PG	9	(United Arab Emirates)	Saeed Alajmani	1.85 m (6 ft 1 in)
SG	14	(United Arab Emirates)	Mohammad Alajmani	1.85 m (6 ft 1 in)
SG	15	(United Arab Emirates)	Talal Alnuaimi	1.84 m (6 ft 0 in)
PG	22	(United Arab Emirates)	Mohammad Juma	1.70 m (5 ft 7 in)
C	23	(United Arab Emirates)	Qais Alshabebi	2.00 m (6 ft 7 in)
PF	41	(United States)	Nick Minnerath	2.06 m (6 ft 9 in)

Head coach

- (Bosnia and Herzegovina) Zoran Zupcevic

Legend

- (C) Team captain
- Injured

== Notable players ==
To appear in this section a player must have either:

Set a club record or won an individual award as a professional player.

Played at least one official international match for his senior national team at any time.

- (United Arab Emirates) Qais Alshabebi
- (Germany) Maik Zirbes
- (Latvia) Kaspars Cipruss

== Sponsorship ==
Dubai Silicon Oasis Authority has been the team's official jersey sponsor.

== See also ==
- Dubai Basketball
