= 2022–23 FIBA West Asia Super League =

1st season of the West Asia Super League

2022–23 FIBA WASL season
- League: FIBA West Asia Super League
- Sport: Basketball
- Duration: 19 December 2022 – 17 June 2023
- Number of teams: 18

Gulf League
- Season champions: Kuwait Club (1st title)
- Runners-up: (Bahrain) Manama

West Asia League
- Season champions: (Lebanon) Al Riyadi Beirut (1st title)
- Runners-up: (Iran) Shahrdari Gorgan

Final Eight
- Venue: Sheikh Saeed Bin Maktoum Sports Hall, Dubai, United Arab Emirates
- Champions: (Bahrain) Manama (1st title)
- Runners-up: Kuwait Club

Seasons
- 2023–24 →

The 2022–23 FIBA West Asia Super League was the inaugural season of the West Asia Super League (WASL), organised by FIBA Asia. The league featured eighteen teams. The season began on 19 December 2022 and finished on 17 June 2023 with the final game of the Final Eight, which was hosted in Dubai.

The league was split in two subdivisions, the West Asia League and the Gulf League, with both of them having a finals to determine the subdivision winners.

Manama won the inaugural title after defeating Kuwait Club in the championship game. Following their win, Manama was invited for the 2023 FIBA Intercontinental Cup.

== Format ==
The season exists out of 18 teams. Eight teams in the Western Asia region compete in home and away games for the sub-zonal title, while eight teams in the Gulf region do the same. The top three teams from each division advance to the Final round. There they are joined by the champions of the Kazakhstan Basketball Championship and the invited Indian representative. The two teams that advance to the championship game qualify for the 2023 FIBA Asia Champions Cup.

== Teams ==
The Chennai Heat as the Indian National Basketball League champions, were supposed to play in the Final 8, but withdrew.

Final 8
(Kazakhstan) Astana (1st)	(India) ~~Chennai Heat~~ (1st)		
Group phase
West Asia		Gulf	
(Lebanon) Beirut Club (1st)	(Syria) Al Ittihad Aleppo (1st)	(Saudi Arabia) Al Hilal (1st)	(Qatar) Al Sadd (1st)
(Lebanon) Al Riyadi (2nd)	(Syria) Al Karamah (2nd)	(Saudi Arabia) Al Nassr (2nd)	(United Arab Emirates) Shabab Al Ahli (1st)
(Iran) Shahrdari Gorgan (1st)	(Jordan) Orthodox Amman (1st) (Note: On December 15, 2022, FIBA announced that Jordanian Premier League runners-up Orthodox Amman were to replace champions Orthodox Ramallah as the representative of Jordan.)	Kuwait (1st)	(Oman) Al Bashaer (1st)
(Iran) Zob Ahan Isfahan (2nd)	(Iraq) Al Naft (1st)	(Kuwait) Kazma (2nd)	(Bahrain) Manama (1st)

== Draw ==
The draw was held on 28 October in Beirut, the capital of Lebanon.

== West Asia League ==
The West Asia League began on 21 December 2022 and ended on 17 May 2023.

=== Group phase ===
==== Group A ====
Pos	Team	Pld	W	L	PF	PA	PD	Pts	Qualification	(Lebanon) BEI	(Iran) ZAI	(Jordan) ORT	(Syria) ITT
1	(Lebanon) Beirut Club	4	3	1	321	269	+52	7	Advance to semi-finals	—	73–56	89–76	Canc.
2	(Iran) Zob Ahan Isfahan	4	2	2	306	312	−6	6	Advance to semi-finals qualifiers	79–72	—	89–81	Canc.
3	(Jordan) Orthodox Amman	4	1	3	301	347	−46	5	Advance to semi-finals qualifiers	58–87	86–82	—	Canc.
4	(Syria) Al Ittihad Aleppo (Note: Al Ittihad Aleppo has forfeited all their games due to withdrawal from the tournament as a result of the 2023 Turkey–Syria earthquake.)	0	0	0	0	0	0	0	Withdrew	Canc.	Canc.	Canc.	—

Source: FIBA WASL
Rules for classification: 1) Points; 2) Head-to-head results; 3) Points difference; 4) Points scored.

==== Group B ====
Pos	Team	Pld	W	L	PF	PA	PD	Pts	Qualification	(Iran) SHA	(Lebanon) RIY	(Iraq) ALN	(Syria) KAR
1	(Iran) Shahrdari Gorgan	4	3	1	360	303	+57	7	Advance to semi-finals	—	75–62	110–69	Canc.
2	(Lebanon) Al Riyadi Beirut	4	2	2	337	347	−10	6	Advance to semi-finals qualifiers	81–74	—	107–98	Canc.
3	(Iraq) Al Naft	4	1	3	358	405	−47	5	Advance to semi-finals qualifiers	91–101	100–87	—	Canc.
4	(Syria) Al Karamah (Note: Al Karamah has forfeited all their games due to withdrawal from the tournament as a result of the 2023 Turkey–Syria earthquake.)	0	0	0	0	0	0	0	Withdrew	Canc.	Canc.	Canc.	—

Source: FIBA WASL
Rules for classification: 1) Points; 2) Head-to-head results; 3) Points difference; 4) Points scored.

=== Final phase ===
Qualification to semifinals
B2	(Lebanon) Al Riyadi Beirut	102	95	97
A3	(Jordan) Orthodox Amman	83	105	62
A2	(Iran) Zob Ahan Isfahan	109	82	95
B3	(Iraq) Al Naft	102	90	83

Semifinals
A1	(Lebanon) Beirut Club	77	92
B2	(Lebanon) Al Riyadi Beirut	104	102
B1	(Iran) Shahrdari Gorgan	91	86
A2	(Iran) Zob Ahan Isfahan	72	81

Finals
B2	(Lebanon) Al Riyadi Beirut	87	114
B1	(Iran) Shahrdari Gorgan	79	100
Third place game
A1	(Lebanon) Beirut Club	93
A2	(Iran) Zob Ahan Isfahan	75

== Gulf League ==
The Gulf League began on 19 December 2022 and ended on 15 May 2023 with the last game of the finals.

=== Group phase ===
==== Group A ====
Pos	Team	Pld	W	L	PF	PA	PD	Pts	Qualification	(Saudi Arabia) HIL	(United Arab Emirates) SAA	(Kuwait) KAZ	(Oman) BAS
1	(Saudi Arabia) Al Hilal	6	5	1	528	428	+100	11	Advance to semi-finals	—	81–72	96–92	86–54
2	(United Arab Emirates) Shabab Al Ahli	6	4	2	487	465	+22	10	Advance to semi-finals qualifiers	75–70	—	91–86	92–61
3	(Kuwait) Kazma	6	3	3	537	516	+21	9	Advance to semi-finals qualifiers	87–92	98–86	—	84–77
4	(Oman) Al Bashaer	6	0	6	383	526	−143	6		48–103	69–71	74–90	—

Source: FIBA Gulf
Rules for classification: 1) Points; 2) Head-to-head results; 3) Points difference; 4) Points scored.

==== Group B ====
Pos	Team	Pld	W	L	PF	PA	PD	Pts	Qualification	(Kuwait) KUW	(Bahrain) MAN	(Saudi Arabia) NAS	(Qatar) SAD
1	Kuwait Club	6	6	0	597	496	+101	12	Advance to semi-finals	—	106–78	106–83	99–93
2	(Bahrain) Manama Club	6	4	2	543	523	+20	10	Advance to semi-finals qualifiers	88–91	—	105–74	98–86
3	(Saudi Arabia) Al Nassr Riyadh	6	1	5	462	549	−87	7 (Note: Head-to-head on point differential: Al Nassr Riyadh 163–162 Al Sadd.)	Advance to semi-finals qualifiers	70–101	72–75	—	77–78
4	(Qatar) Al Sadd	6	1	5	519	553	−34	7		84–94	94–99	84–86	—

Source: FIBA Gulf
Rules for classification: 1) Points; 2) Head-to-head results; 3) Points difference; 4) Points scored.

=== Final phase ===
Qualification to semifinals
B2	(Bahrain) Manama Club	69	100	82
A3	(Kuwait) Kazma	83	90	79
A2	(United Arab Emirates) Shabab Al Ahli	100	67	93
B3	(Saudi Arabia) Al Nassr Riyadh	90	68	71

Semifinals
A1	(Saudi Arabia) Al Hilal	78	71
B2	(Bahrain) Manama Club	82	86
B1	Kuwait Club	87	110
A2	(United Arab Emirates) Shabab Al Ahli	71	100

Finals
B2	(Bahrain) Manama Club	78	85
B1	Kuwait Club	87	95
Third place game
A1	(Saudi Arabia) Al Hilal	76
A2	(United Arab Emirates) Shabab Al Ahli	88

== Final Eight ==
In the Final Eight, the top three teams from the West Asia and the Gulf League were joined by the proposed teams from South and Central Asia (India and Kazakhstan). On 23 May FIBA announced that the Sheikh Saeed Bin Maktoum Sports Hall in Dubai, United Arab Emirates, would host the inaugural Final Eight.

The final stage began on 9 June and finished on 17 June with the WASL championship game.

=== Group A ===
Pos	Team	Pld	W	L	PF	PA	PD	Pts	Qualification
1	(Lebanon) Al Riyadi	2	2	0	218	175	+43	4	Advance to semifinals
2	(Bahrain) Manama	2	1	1	170	187	−17	3	Advance to semifinals
3	(Lebanon) Beirut Club	2	0	2	166	192	−26	2	
4	(India) Chennai Heat	0	0	0	0	0	0	0	Withdrew

Source: FIBA

10 June
18:45

Boxscore

Al Riyadi (Lebanon)	112–84	(Bahrain) Manama
Scoring by quarter: 21–24, 34–15, 24–21, 33–24
Pts: Reath 22; Rebs: Gyokchyan, Murphy 5 Asts: Saoud 9		Pts: Rashed 21; Rebs: Pointer 13; Asts: Pointer 5

Sheikh Saeed Bin Maktoum Sports Hall, Dubai
Attendance: 2,000
Referees: Takaki Kato (JPN), Yevgeniy Mikheyev (KAZ), Park Kyoungjin (KOR)

12 June
21:45

Boxscore

Beirut Club (Lebanon)	91–106	(Lebanon) Al Riyadi
Scoring by quarter: 16–20, 27–22, 17–21, 31–25
Pts: Jackson 23; Rebs: Crawford 7 Asts: Crawford 7		Pts: Reath, Murphy 24; Rebs: Reath 11; Asts: Saoud 10

Sheikh Saeed Bin Maktoum Sports Hall, Dubai
Attendance: 654
Referees: Mohammad Alamiri (KUW), Ahmed Al-Bulushi(OMA), Mohammad Doost (IRI)

14 June
19:00

Boxscore

Manama (Bahrain)	86–75	(Lebanon) Beirut Club
Scoring by quarter: 22–18, 28–20, 16–20, 20–17
Pts: Rashed 16; Rebs: Pointer 8 Asts: Rashed 5		Pts: Rustom 15; Rebs: Crawford 7 Asts: Jackson 4

Sheikh Saeed Bin Maktoum Sports Hall, Dubai
Attendance: 143
Referees: Takaki Kato (JPN), Yevgeniy Mikheyev (KAZ), Park Kyoungjin (KOR)

=== Group B ===
Pos	Team	Pld	W	L	PF	PA	PD	Pts	Qualification
1	(Kazakhstan) Astana	3	3	0	252	226	+26	6	Advance to semifinals
2	Kuwait Club	3	2	1	242	230	+12	5	Advance to semifinals
3	(Iran) Shahrdari Gorgan	3	1	2	251	257	−6	4	
4	(United Arab Emirates) Shabab Al Ahli	3	0	3	208	240	−32	3	

Source: FIBA

9 June
19:00

Boxscore

Astana (Kazakhstan)	80–73	(United Arab Emirates) Shabab Al Ahli
Scoring by quarter: 21–16, 28–20, 12–17, 19–20
Pts: Anderson 19; Rebs: Marchuk 5 Asts: Johnson 7		Pts: Pustovyi 21; Rebs: Pustovyi 14; Asts: Miller Jr., Alajmani 5

Sheikh Saeed Bin Maktoum Sports Hall, Dubai
Attendance: 100
Referees: Ahmed Ali Yaseen Al-Shuwali (IRQ), Lee Kyounghwan (KOR), Saif Al-Dossari (QAT)

9 June
21:45

Boxscore

Kuwait Club	95–85	(Iran) Shahrdari Gorgan
Scoring by quarter: 25–19, 16–26, 30–15, 24–25
Pts: Georges-Hunt 29; Rebs: Jawhar 8 Asts: Hamad Hasan, Alshemmari 5		Pts: Jamshidi 17; Rebs: Petty 7 Asts: Jamshidi 4

Sheikh Saeed Bin Maktoum Sports Hall, Dubai
Attendance: 200
Referees: Takaki Kato (JPN), Park Kyoungjin (KOR), Wissam Zein (SYR)

11 June
16:00

Boxscore

Shahrdari Gorgan (Iran)	81–87	(Kazakhstan) Astana
Scoring by quarter: 19–26, 20–15, 26–27, 16–19
Pts: Yakhchali 24; Rebs: Alston 13; Asts: Petty 6		Pts: Anderson 30; Rebs: Anderson, Gavrilov 6 Asts: Johnson 10

Sheikh Saeed Bin Maktoum Sports Hall, Dubai
Attendance: 100
Referees: Ahmed Ali Yaseen Al-Shuwali (IRQ), Ahmed Al-Bulushi (OMA), Wissam Zein (SYR)

11 June
18:45

Boxscore

Shabab Al Ahli (United Arab Emirates)	60–75	Kuwait Club
Scoring by quarter: 22–23, 14–23, 14–17, 10–12
Pts: Miller Jr. 16; Rebs: Miller Jr. 11; Asts: Miller Jr. 6		Pts: Hasan 26; Rebs: Maker 13; Asts: Georges-Hunt 5

Sheikh Saeed Bin Maktoum Sports Hall, Dubai
Attendance: 50
Referees: Takaki Kato (JPN), Saif Al-Dossari (QAT), Lee Kyounghwan (KOR)

13 June
19:00

Boxscore

Astana (Kazakhstan)	85–72	Kuwait Club
Scoring by quarter: 20–18, 28–19, 20–18, 17–17
Pts: Anderson 24; Rebs: Marchuk 8 Asts: Johnson 7		Pts: Georges-Hunt 16; Rebs: Hasan 7 Asts: Hasan, Alshemmari 3

Sheikh Saeed Bin Maktoum Sports Hall, Dubai
Attendance: 344
Referees: Takaki Kato (JPN), Ahmed Al-Bulushi (OMA), Park Kyoungjin (KOR)

13 June
21:45

Boxscore

Shahrdari Gorgan (Iran)	85–73	(United Arab Emirates) Shabab Al Ahli
Scoring by quarter: 21–17, 17–20, 22–20, 25–18
Pts: Jamshidi 35; Rebs: Alston 18; Asts: Jamshidi 10		Pts: Miller Jr. 23; Rebs: Miller Jr. 13; Asts: three players 5

Sheikh Saeed Bin Maktoum Sports Hall, Dubai
Attendance: 234
Referees: Mohammad Alamiri (KUW), Yevgeniy Mikheyev (KAZ), Saif Al-Dossari (QAT)

=== Final phase ===
Semifinals
16 June
(Lebanon) Al Riyadi	85
Kuwait Club	95
16 June
(Kazakhstan) Astana	81
(Bahrain) Manama	91

Final
17 June
Kuwait Club	59
(Bahrain) Manama	67
Third place game
17 June
(Lebanon) Al Riyadi	90
(Kazakhstan) Astana	94

==== Semi-finals ====
16 June

Boxscore

Astana (Kazakhstan)	81–91	(Bahrain) Manama
Scoring by quarter: 26–22, 18–23, 14–25, 23–21
Pts: Johnson 29; Rebs: Gavrilov, Anderson 5 Asts: Johnson 6		Pts: Rashed 23; Rebs: Evans 11; Asts: Pointer, Rashed 5

Sheikh Saeed Bin Maktoum Sports Hall, Dubai
Attendance: 234

16 June

Boxscore

Al Riyadi Beirut (Lebanon)	85–95	Kuwait Club
Scoring by quarter: 18–33, 16–24, 21–20, 30–18
Pts: Reath 31; Rebs: Reath 10; Asts: Saoud 6		Pts: Georges-Hunt 32; Rebs: Jawhar, Lalanne 6 Asts: Georges-Hunt, Alshemmari 4

Sheikh Saeed Bin Maktoum Sports Hall, Dubai
Attendance: 300

==== Third place game ====
17 June

Boxscore

Al Riyadi Beirut (Lebanon)	90–94	(Kazakhstan) Astana
Scoring by quarter: 21–31, 23–16, 17–16, 29–31
Pts: Reath 23; Rebs: Reath 13; Asts: Murphy 5		Pts: Krampelj 23; Rebs: Krampelj 8 Asts: Johnson 8

Sheikh Saeed Bin Maktoum Sports Hall, Dubai
Attendance: 100

==== Championship game ====
17 June

Boxscore

Kuwait Club	59–67	(Bahrain) Manama
Scoring by quarter: 14–18, 12–21, 13–11, 20–17
Pts: Hasan 25; Rebs: Lalanne, Hasan 6 Asts: five players 1		Pts: Rashed 18; Rebs: Pointer 8 Asts: Pointer, Thibodeaux 3

Sheikh Saeed Bin Maktoum Sports Hall, Dubai
Attendance: 800
