= 2022–23 FIBA WASL West Asia League =

Sports season

FIBA WASL West Asia League
- Season: 2022–23
- Duration: 21 December 2022 – 17 May 2023
- Teams: 8

Final Four
- Champions: (Lebanon) Al Riyadi Beirut
- Runners-up: (Iran) Shahrdari Gorgan
- Third place: (Lebanon) Beirut Club
- Fourth place: (Iran) Zob Ahan Isfahan

Seasons
- 2024–25 →

The West Asia League of the 2022–23 FIBA West Asia Super League (FIBA WASL) was one of the two primary phases of West Asia's premier basketball competition. The games began on 21 December 2022 and ended on 17 May 2023.

Al Riyadi Beirut won the inaugural West Asia League subdivision title.

== Group phase ==
=== Group A ===
Pos	Team	Pld	W	L	PF	PA	PD	Pts	Qualification	(Lebanon) BEI	(Iran) ZAI	(Jordan) ORT	(Syria) ITT
1	(Lebanon) Beirut Club	4	3	1	321	269	+52	7	Advance to semi-finals	—	73–56	89–76	Canc.
2	(Iran) Zob Ahan Isfahan	4	2	2	306	312	−6	6	Advance to semi-finals qualifiers	79–72	—	89–81	Canc.
3	(Jordan) Orthodox Amman	4	1	3	301	347	−46	5	Advance to semi-finals qualifiers	58–87	86–82	—	Canc.
4	(Syria) Al Ittihad Aleppo (Note: Al Ittihad Aleppo has forfeited all their games due to withdrawal from the tournament as a result of the 2023 Turkey–Syria earthquake.)	0	0	0	0	0	0	0	Withdrew	Canc.	Canc.	Canc.	—

Source: FIBA WASL
Rules for classification: 1) Points; 2) Head-to-head results; 3) Points difference; 4) Points scored.
Notes:

22 December 2022	Beirut Club (Lebanon)	73–56	(Iran) Zob Ahan Isfahan	Zouk Mikael
17:40	Scoring by quarter: 19–13, 10–12, 22–20, 22–11
	Pts: Haidar 22; Rebs: Horton 10; Asts: Hayes 6	Boxscore	Pts: Gholizadeh 11; Rebs: Kazemi 10; Asts: Aslani 7	Arena: Stade Nouhad Naufal; Attendance: 1,057; Referees: Yevgeniy Mikheyev (KAZ), Budi Marfan (INA), Yana Nikogossyan (KAZ)

29 December 2022	Orthodox Amman (Jordan)	58–87	(Lebanon) Beirut Club	Amman
18:40	Scoring by quarter: 12–20, 14–24, 20–19, 12–24
	Pts: Hussein 14; Rebs: Alnajdawi 9 Asts: Ibrahim 6	Boxscore	Pts: Haidar 25; Rebs: Thomas 8 Asts: Thomas 8	Arena: Prince Hamzah Stadium; Attendance: 560; Referees: Yevgeniy Mikheyev (KAZ), Budi Marfan (INA), Yana Nikogossyan (KAZ)

12 January 2023	Zob Ahan Isfahan (Iran)	89–81	(Jordan) Orthodox Amman	Tehran
16:30	Scoring by quarter: 32–26, 14–17, 26–23, 17–15
	Pts: Zangeneh 25; Rebs: Kazemi 14; Asts: Aslani 9	Boxscore	Pts: Ibrahim 24; Rebs: Peterson 13; Asts: four players 2	Arena: Azadi Basketball Hall; Attendance: 2,008; Referees: Ahmed Al Bulushi (OMA), Preeda Muongmee (THA), Mohamed Hasan Alsalam (BHR)

25 January 2023	Zob Ahan Isfahan (Iran)	79–72	(Lebanon) Beirut Club	Tehran
18:00	Scoring by quarter: 19–16, 21–22, 23–18, 16–16
	Pts: Aslani 16; Rebs: Kazemi 11; Asts: Mashayekhi 11	Boxscore	Pts: Horton 19; Rebs: Rustom 6 Asts: Akl 8	Arena: Azadi Basketball Hall; Attendance: 300; Referees: Mohammad Alamiri (KUW), Issam Nasser Al Siyabi (OMA), Imran Ali Baig (IND)

15 March 2023	Beirut Club (Lebanon)	89–76	(Jordan) Orthodox Amman	Zouk Mikael
21:30	Scoring by quarter: 23–20, 18–16, 26–21, 22–19
	Pts: Hayes 23; Rebs: Muhammad 9 Asts: Hayes 8	Boxscore	Pts: Dorsey 17; Rebs: Peterson 14; Asts: Ibrahim 10	Arena: Stade Nouhad Naufal; Attendance: 2,360; Referees: Harja Jaladri (INA), Alexey Stepanenko (KAZ), Rakesh Ramalingaiah (IND)

23 March 2023	Orthodox Amman (Jordan)	86–82	(Iran) Zob Ahan Isfahan	Amman
22:00	Scoring by quarter: 31–20, 26–18, 12–21, 17–23
	Pts: Dorsey 33; Rebs: Peterson 11; Asts: Ibrahim 10	Boxscore	Pts: Hassanzadeh 19; Rebs: Hassanzadeh 8 Asts: Aslani 9	Arena: Prince Hamzah Stadium; Attendance: 100; Referees: Mohammad Alamiri (KUW), Mohamed Hasan Alsalam (BHR), Issam Nasser Al Siyabi (OMA),

=== Group B ===
Pos	Team	Pld	W	L	PF	PA	PD	Pts	Qualification	(Iran) SHA	(Lebanon) RIY	(Iraq) ALN	(Syria) KAR
1	(Iran) Shahrdari Gorgan	4	3	1	360	303	+57	7	Advance to semi-finals	—	75–62	110–69	Canc.
2	(Lebanon) Al Riyadi Beirut	4	2	2	337	347	−10	6	Advance to semi-finals qualifiers	81–74	—	107–98	Canc.
3	(Iraq) Al Naft	4	1	3	358	405	−47	5	Advance to semi-finals qualifiers	91–101	100–87	—	Canc.
4	(Syria) Al Karamah (Note: Al Karamah has forfeited all their games due to withdrawal from the tournament as a result of the 2023 Turkey–Syria earthquake.)	0	0	0	0	0	0	0	Withdrew	Canc.	Canc.	Canc.	—

Source: FIBA WASL
Rules for classification: 1) Points; 2) Head-to-head results; 3) Points difference; 4) Points scored.
Notes:

21 December 2022	Al Riyadi Beirut (Lebanon)	81–74	(Iran) Shahrdari Gorgan	Manara
21:30	Scoring by quarter: 24–24, 15–15, 26–14, 16–21
	Pts: Arakji 27; Rebs: Majok 8 Asts: Arakji 7	Boxscore	Pts: Yakhchali 26; Rebs: Monji, Udras 7 Asts: Petty 4	Arena: Saeb Salam Stadium; Attendance: 1,100; Referees: Yevgeniy Mikheyev (KAZ), Budi Marfan (INA), Yana Nikogossyan (KAZ)

28 December 2022	Al Naft (Iraq)	100–87	(Lebanon) Al Riyadi Beirut	Baghdad
18:00	Scoring by quarter: 21–17, 33–23, 22–18, 24–29
	Pts: Sosa 35; Rebs: Wiggins 10; Asts: Sosa 7	Boxscore	Pts: Saoud 23; Rebs: Majok 11; Asts: Ahmad 5	Arena: Al Shaeb Hall; Attendance: 200; Referees: Ahmed Al Bulushi (OMA), Mohamed Hasan Alsalam (BHR), Issam Nasser Al Siyabi (OMA)

4 January 2023	Shahrdari Gorgan (Iran)	110–69	(Iraq) Al Naft	Tehran
16:30	Scoring by quarter: 19–14, 30–18, 30–17, 31–20
	Pts: Jamshidi 31; Rebs: Pazrofteh 15; Asts: Jamshidi, Petty 7	Boxscore	Pts: Wiggins 29; Rebs: Wiggins 10; Asts: Hamzah 8	Arena: Azadi Basketball Hall; Attendance: 1,000; Referees: Ahmed Al Bulushi (OMA), Saif Al Dossari (QAT), Imran Ali Baig (IND)

18 January 2023	Shahrdari Gorgan (Iran)	75–62	(Lebanon) Al Riyadi Beirut	Tehran
18:00	Scoring by quarter: 16–12, 19–14, 20–22, 20–14
	Pts: Petty 26; Rebs: Pazrofteh 9 Asts: Jamshidi 6	Boxscore	Pts: Arakji 16; Rebs: Majok 11; Asts: four players 2	Arena: Azadi Basketball Hall; Attendance: 3,006; Referees: Mohammad Alamiri (KUW), Alexey Stepanenko (KAZ), Mohamed Hasan Alsalam (BHR)

9 March 2023	Al Riyadi Beirut (Lebanon)	107–98	(Iraq) Al Naft	Manara
17:40	Scoring by quarter: 27–23, 18–30, 32–23, 30–22
	Pts: Johnson 21; Rebs: Ahmad 7 Asts: Ahmad 5	Boxscore	Pts: Sosa 46; Rebs: Nahi 11; Asts: Sosa 7	Arena: Saeb Salam Stadium; Attendance: 930; Referees: Harja Jaladri (INA), Mohammad Alamiri (KUW), Alexey Stepanenko (KAZ)

22 March 2023	Al Naft (Iraq)	91–101	(Iran) Shahrdari Gorgan	Baghdad
18:00	Scoring by quarter: 23–29, 26–23, 19–28, 23–21
	Pts: Sosa 34; Rebs: Wiggins 11; Asts: Hamzah 5	Boxscore	Pts: Yakhchali 29; Rebs: Pazrofteh 10; Asts: Yakhchali, Jamshidi 7	Arena: Al Shaeb Hall; Referees: Mohammad Alamiri (KUW), Issam Nasser Al Siyabi (OMA), Mohamed Hasan Alsalam (BHR)

== Final phase ==
All match-ups are best-of-three playoffs.

=== Bracket ===
Qualification to semifinals
B2	(Lebanon) Al Riyadi Beirut	102
A3	(Jordan) Orthodox Amman	83
A2	(Iran) Zob Ahan Isfahan	109
B3	(Iraq) Al Naft	102

Semifinals
A1	(Lebanon) Beirut Club	77
B2	(Lebanon) Al Riyadi Beirut	104
B1	(Iran) Shahrdari Gorgan	91
A2	(Iran) Zob Ahan Isfahan	72

Finals
B2	(Lebanon) Al Riyadi Beirut	87
B1	(Iran) Shahrdari Gorgan	79
Third place game
A1	(Lebanon) Beirut Club	93
A2	(Iran) Zob Ahan Isfahan	75

=== Qualification to semifinals ===
==== (A2) Zob Ahan Isfahan vs. (B3) Al Naft ====
29 March 2023
22:00

Box Scores

Zob Ahan Isfahan (Iran)	109–102 (OT)	(Iraq) Al Naft
Scoring by quarter: 18–28, 23–29, 25–24, 27–12, Overtime: 16–9
Pts: Gholizadeh 31; Rebs: Zangeneh 19; Asts: Mashayekhi 8		Pts: Sosa 32; Rebs: Nahi 7 Asts: Sosa 7
Zob Ahan leads series, 1–0

Azadi Basketball Hall, Tehran
Attendance: 100
Referees: Yevgeniy Mikheyev (KAZ), Mohammad Alamiri (KUW), Wissam Zein (SYR)

5 April 2023
22:00

Box Scores

Al Naft (Iraq)	90–82	(Iran) Zob Ahan Isfahan
Scoring by quarter: 18–18, 25–3, 23–35, 24–26
Pts: Sosa 32; Rebs: Nahi 7 Asts: Sosa 5		Pts: Mashayekhi 20; Rebs: Kazemi 8 Asts: Zangeneh 4
series tied, 1–1

Al Shaeb Hall, Baghdad
Attendance: 1,000
Referees: Mohammad Alamiri (KUW), Yevgeniy Mikheyev (KAZ), Wissam Zein (SYR)

12 April 2023
22:00

Box Scores

Zob Ahan Isfahan (Iran)	95–83	(Iraq) Al Naft
Scoring by quarter: 20–23, 28–20, 24–19, 23–21
Pts: Kazemi 28; Rebs: Zangeneh 15; Asts: Mashayekhi 6		Pts: Sosa 40; Rebs: Aldiwani 9 Asts: Sosa, Hamzah 5
Zob Ahan wins series, 2–1

Azadi Basketball Hall, Tehran
Attendance: 1,250
Referees: Mohammad Alamiri (KUW), Yevgeniy Mikheyev (KAZ), Wissam Zein (SYR)

==== (B2) Al Riyadi Beirut vs. (A3) Orthodox Amman ====
30 March 2023
22:00

Box Scores

Al Riyadi Beirut (Lebanon)	102–83	(Jordan) Orthodox Amman
Scoring by quarter: 13–20, 19–16, 41–23, 29–24
Pts: Murphy 27; Rebs: Ochefu 11; Asts: Saoud 8		Pts: Ibrahim 28; Rebs: Alhamarsheh 12; Asts: Ibrahim 7
Al Riyadi Beirut leads series, 1–0

Saeb Salam Stadium, Manara
Attendance: 577
Referees: Yevgeniy Mikheyev (KAZ), Ahmed Al Bulushi (OMA), Saif Al Dossari (QAT)

6 April 2023
22:00

Box Scores

Orthodox Amman (Jordan)	105–95	(Lebanon) Al Riyadi Beirut
Scoring by quarter: 27–24, 25–22, 28–29, 25–20
Pts: Peterson 34; Rebs: Peterson 9 Asts: Ibrahim 12		Pts: Murphy 26; Rebs: Ochefu 8 Asts: Arakji 6
series tied, 1–1

Prince Hamzah Stadium, Amman
Attendance: 1,365
Referees: Mohammad Alamiri (KUW), Yevgeniy Mikheyev (KAZ), Saif Al Dossari (QAT)

13 April 2023
22:00

Box Scores

Al Riyadi Beirut (Lebanon)	97–62	(Jordan) Orthodox Amman
Scoring by quarter: 30–12, 24–16, 23–25, 20–19
Pts: Murphy 28; Rebs: Ochefu 14; Asts: Saoud 8		Pts: Dorsey 18; Rebs: Alhamarsheh 8 Asts: Dorsey 6
Al Riyadi Beirut wins series, 2–1

Saeb Salam Stadium, Manara
Attendance: 1,207
Referees: Mohammad Alamiri (KUW), Yevgeniy Mikheyev (KAZ), Ahmed Al Bulushi (OMA)

=== Semifinals ===
==== (A1) Beirut Club vs. (B2) Al Riyadi Beirut ====
19 April 2023
22:00

Box Scores

Beirut Club (Lebanon)	77–104	(Lebanon) Al Riyadi Beirut
Scoring by quarter: 14–26, 22–35, 16–23, 25–20
Pts: Davis, Hayes 21; Rebs: Davis 11; Asts: Jamaleddine 3		Pts: Murphy 26; Rebs: Saoud, Zeinoun 7 Asts: Arakji 7
Al Riyadi Beirut leads series, 1–0

Stade Nouhad Naufal, Zouk Mikael
Attendance: 2,757
Referees: Harja Jaladri (INA), Yevgeniy Mikheyev (KAZ), Yu Jung (TPE)

26 April 2023
21:45

Box Scores

Al Riyadi Beirut (Lebanon)	102–92	(Lebanon) Beirut Club
Scoring by quarter: 27–21, 36–23, 22–24, 17–24
Pts: Murphy 30; Rebs: Reath 11; Asts: Arakji 9		Pts: Haidar 22; Rebs: Jamaleddine 10; Asts: Hayes 9
Al Riyadi Beirut wins series, 2–0

Saeb Salam Stadium, Manara
Attendance: 1,237
Referees: Mohammad Alamiri (KUW), Yevgeniy Mikheyev (KAZ), Wissam Zein (SYR)

==== (B1) Shahrdari Gorgan vs. (A2) Zob Ahan Isfahan ====
20 April 2023
22:00

Box Scores

Shahrdari Gorgan (Iran)	91–72	(Iran) Zob Ahan Isfahan
Scoring by quarter: 20–22, 30–8, 16–28, 25–14
Pts: Yakhchali 25; Rebs: Petty 26; Asts: Petty, Jamshidi 4		Pts: Zangeneh 21; Rebs: Kazemi 10; Asts: Aslani 8
Shahrdari Gorgan leads series, 1–0

Azadi Basketball Hall, Tehran
Attendance: 2,000
Referees: Mohammad Alamiri (KUW), Ahmed Al Bulushi (OMA), Saif Al Dossari (QAT)

27 April 2023
20:00

Box Scores

Zob Ahan Isfahan (Iran)	81–86	(Iran) Shahrdari Gorgan
Scoring by quarter: 23–13, 20–26, 20–28, 18–19
Pts: Mesiček 24; Rebs: Kazemi 9 Asts: Kazemi 6		Pts: Jamshidi 24; Rebs: Yakhchali 10; Asts: Jamshidi, Petty 5
Shahrdari Gorgan wins series, 2–0

Azadi Basketball Hall, Tehran
Attendance: 1,000
Referees: Yevgeniy Mikheyev (KAZ), Ahmed Al Bulushi (OMA), Saif Al Dossari (QAT)

=== Third place game ===
10 May 2023
21:45

Box Scores

Beirut Club (Lebanon)	93–75	(Iran) Zob Ahan Isfahan
Scoring by quarter: 26–14, 15–26, 34–16, 18–19
Pts: Haidar 28; Rebs: Muhammad 10; Asts: Akl 10		Pts: Kashani 14; Rebs: Kazemi 20; Asts: Kazemi 8

Stade Nouhad Naufal, Zouk Mikael
Attendance: 1,507
Referees: Mohammad Alamiri (KUW), Yevgeniy Mikheyev (KAZ), Ahmed Al Bulushi (OMA)

=== Finals ===
11 May 2023
18:00

Box Scores

Shahrdari Gorgan (Iran)	79–87	(Lebanon) Al Riyadi Beirut
Scoring by quarter: 20–28, 20–20, 21–18, 18–21
Pts: Jamshidi 24; Rebs: Yakhchali 12; Asts: Mozafari 6		Pts: Reath 34; Rebs: Reath 10; Asts: Mansour 4
Al Riyadi Beirut leads series, 1–0

Azadi Basketball Hall, Tehran
Attendance: 2,000
Referees: Mohammad Alamiri (KUW), Yevgeniy Mikheyev (KAZ), Saif Al Dossari (QAT)

17 May 2023
21:45

Box Scores

Al Riyadi Beirut (Lebanon)	114–100	(Iran) Shahrdari Gorgan
Scoring by quarter: 28–24, 30–19, 29–26, 27–31
Pts: Reath 26; Rebs: Reath 9 Asts: Arakji 5		Pts: Petty 29; Rebs: Petty 12; Asts: Petty 12
Al Riyadi Beirut wins championship, 2–0

Stade Nouhad Naufal, Zouk Mikael
Attendance: 5,647
Referees: Yevgeniy Mikheyev (KAZ), Ahmed Al Bulushi (OMA), Wissam Zein (SYR)
