= 2022–23 FIBA WASL Gulf League =

Sports season

FIBA WASL Gulf League
- Season: 2022–23
- Duration: 19 December 2022 – 15 May 2023
- Teams: 8

Final Four
- Champions: Kuwait Club
- Runners-up: (Bahrain) Manama Club
- Third place: (United Arab Emirates) Shabab Al Ahli
- Fourth place: (Saudi Arabia) Al Hilal

Seasons
- 2024–25 →

The Gulf League of the 2022–23 FIBA West Asia Super League (FIBA WASL) was one of the two primary phases of West Asia's premier basketball competition. The games began on 19 December 2022 and ended on 15 May 2023.

Kuwait Club won the Gulf League title after defeating Manama in the finals.

== Group phase ==
=== Group A ===
Pos	Team	Pld	W	L	PF	PA	PD	Pts	Qualification	(Saudi Arabia) HIL	(United Arab Emirates) SAA	(Kuwait) KAZ	(Oman) BAS
1	(Saudi Arabia) Al Hilal	6	5	1	528	428	+100	11	Advance to semi-finals	—	81–72	96–92	86–54
2	(United Arab Emirates) Shabab Al Ahli	6	4	2	487	465	+22	10	Advance to semi-finals qualifiers	75–70	—	91–86	92–61
3	(Kuwait) Kazma	6	3	3	537	516	+21	9	Advance to semi-finals qualifiers	87–92	98–86	—	84–77
4	(Oman) Al Bashaer	6	0	6	383	526	−143	6		48–103	69–71	74–90	—

Source: FIBA Gulf
Rules for classification: 1) Points; 2) Head-to-head results; 3) Points difference; 4) Points scored.

19 December 2022	Al Bashaer (Oman)	69–71	(United Arab Emirates) Shabab Al Ahli	Muscat
18:00	Scoring by quarter: 18–21, 8–25, 24–13, 19–12
	Pts: Al Halhali, Parks 19; Rebs: Al Halhali 10; Asts: Parks 9	Boxscore	Pts: Minnerath 18; Rebs: Milošević 11; Asts: H. Albreiki 6	Arena: Sultan Qaboos Sports Complex; Attendance: 300; Referees: Mohammad Doost (IRN), Wissam Zein (SYR), Hadi Salem (IRN)

19 December 2022	Al Hilal (Saudi Arabia)	96–92	(Kuwait) Kazma	Riyadh
20:00	Scoring by quarter: 22–26, 26–37, 22–12, 26–17
	Pts: Abdel Gabar 29; Rebs: M. Alsuwailem 12; Asts: Abdel Gabar 8	Boxscore	Pts: Murphy 25; Rebs: Williams 9 Asts: Albaloushi 6	Arena: Green Basketball Court; Attendance: 450; Referees: Rabah Noujaim (LBN), Mohammad Fawzi Taha (JOR), Paul Skayem (LBN)

26 December 2022	Shabab Al Ahli (United Arab Emirates)	91–86	(Kuwait) Kazma	Dubai
19:00	Scoring by quarter: 24–17, 23–27, 18–20, 26–22
	Pts: Minnerath 25; Rebs: Alshabebi 10; Asts: Alajmani 5	Boxscore	Pts: Young 26; Rebs: Williams 12; Asts: Albaloushi 8	Arena: Sheikh Saeed Bin Maktoum Sports Hall; Attendance: 300; Referees: Mohammad Doost (IRN), Wissam Zein (SYR), Hadi Salem (IRN)

26 December 2022	Al Hilal (Saudi Arabia)	86–54	(Oman) Al Bashaer	Riyadh
20:00	Scoring by quarter: 22–14, 20–18, 27–14, 17–8
	Pts: Chapman 34; Rebs: M. Alsuwailem 17; Asts: Lyons, Abdel Gabar 8	Boxscore	Pts: Parks 22; Rebs: Parks 8 Asts: Parks 5	Arena: Green Basketball Court; Attendance: 101; Referees: Ahmed Ali Yaseen Al-Shuwaili (IRQ), Mohammad Fawzi Taha (JOR), Mohammed Ismail Altarawneh (JOR)

2 January 2023	Shabab Al Ahli (United Arab Emirates)	75–70	(Saudi Arabia) Al Hilal	Dubai
18:00	Scoring by quarter: 20–24, 21–15, 16–18, 18–13
	Pts: Minnerath 32; Rebs: Milošević 9 Asts: Triche 4	Boxscore	Pts: Lyons 21; Rebs: M. Alsuwailem 13; Asts: Abdel Gabar 9	Arena: Sheikh Saeed Bin Maktoum Sports Hall; Attendance: 300; Referees: Ahmed Ali Yaseen Al-Shuwaili (IRQ), Wissam Zein (SYR), Mohammed Ismail Altarawneh (JOR)

3 January 2023	Kazma (Kuwait)	84–77	(Oman) Al Bashaer	Kuwait City
19:30	Scoring by quarter: 19–23, 26–16, 20–23, 19–15
	Pts: Murphy 34; Rebs: Williams 14; Asts: Albaloushi 8	Boxscore	Pts: Al Halhali, Parks 17; Rebs: Walker 10; Asts: Parks 8	Arena: Shaikh Saad Alabdullah Sport Hall Complex; Attendance: 100; Referees: Rabah Noujaim (LBN), Mohammad Fawzi Taha (JOR), Paul Skayem (LBN)

16 January 2023	Kazma (Kuwait)	87–92	(Saudi Arabia) Al Hilal	Kuwait City
19:30	Scoring by quarter: 24–18, 27–21, 22–26, 14–27
	Pts: Murphy 25; Rebs: Murphy 10; Asts: Albaloushi 5	Boxscore	Pts: M. Alsuwailem 21; Rebs: M. Alsuwailem 16; Asts: Albargawi 4	Arena: Shaikh Saad Alabdullah Sport Hall Complex; Referees: Yevgeniy Mikheyev (KAZ), Chan Owe Shiong (MAS), Mohammed Ismail Altarawneh (JOR)

17 January 2023	Shabab Al Ahli (United Arab Emirates)	92–61	(Oman) Al Bashaer	Dubai
18:00	Scoring by quarter: 22–12, 19–16, 28–13, 23–20
	Pts: Alshabebi 20; Rebs: Alshabebi 13; Asts: Triche, Milošević 5	Boxscore	Pts: Parks 25; Rebs: Parks 7 Asts: Parks 2	Arena: Sheikh Saeed Bin Maktoum Sports Hall; Referees: Rabah Noujaim (LBN), Mohammad Fawzi Taha (JOR), Anan Daraghma (PLE)

6 March 2023	Al Bashaer (Oman)	48–103	(Saudi Arabia) Al Hilal	Muscat
18:00	Scoring by quarter: 14–26, 11–21, 13–30, 10–26
	Pts: Parks 23; Rebs: Parks, Al Saadi 7 Asts: Bait Bakhit 4	Boxscore	Pts: Chapman 18; Rebs: M. Alsuwailem 17; Asts: M. Alsuwailem 6	Arena: Sultan Qaboos Sports Complex; Attendance: 150; Referees: Ahmed Ali Yaseen Al-Shuwaili (IRQ), Paul Skayem (LBN), Mohammad Fawzi Taha (JOR)

7 March 2023	Kazma (Kuwait)	98–86	(United Arab Emirates) Shabab Al Ahli	Kuwait City
19:30	Scoring by quarter: 24–13, 30–33, 25–17, 19–23
	Pts: Rector 29; Rebs: Mejri 17; Asts: Albaloushi, Borhamah 5	Boxscore	Pts: Minnerath 26; Rebs: Alajmani 9 Asts: Alajmani 13	Arena: Shaikh Saad Alabdullah Sport Hall Complex; Referees: Ahmed Ali Yaseen Al-Shuwaili (IRQ), Mohammad Fawzi Taha (JOR), Taha Al-Hashedi (YEM)

20 March 2023	Al Bashaer (Oman)	74–90	(Kuwait) Kazma	Muscat
18:00	Scoring by quarter: 15–25, 21–24, 10–31, 28–10
	Pts: Al Busaidi 16; Rebs: Al Souli 10; Asts: Al Busaidi 5	Boxscore	Pts: Rector 18; Rebs: Mejri 12; Asts: Albaloushi 8	Arena: Sultan Qaboos Sports Complex; Attendance: 60; Referees: Rabah Noujaim (LBN), Mohammad Doost (IRN), Hadi Salem (IRN)

20 March 2023	Al Hilal (Saudi Arabia)	81–72	(United Arab Emirates) Shabab Al Ahli	Riyadh
20:00	Scoring by quarter: 27–15, 22–22, 12–17, 20–18
	Pts: Albargawi, Chapman 19; Rebs: M. Alsuwailem 13; Asts: Abdel Gabar 5	Boxscore	Pts: Minnerath 26; Rebs: Milošević 8 Asts: Alnuaimi 5	Arena: Green Basketball Court; Attendance: 670; Referees: Harja Jaladri (INA), Ahmed Ali Yaseen Al-Shuwaili (IRQ), Mohammad Fawzi Taha (JOR)

=== Group B ===
Pos	Team	Pld	W	L	PF	PA	PD	Pts	Qualification	(Kuwait) KUW	(Bahrain) MAN	(Saudi Arabia) NAS	(Qatar) SAD
1	Kuwait Club	6	6	0	597	496	+101	12	Advance to semi-finals	—	106–78	106–83	99–93
2	(Bahrain) Manama Club	6	4	2	543	523	+20	10	Advance to semi-finals qualifiers	88–91	—	105–74	98–86
3	(Saudi Arabia) Al Nassr Riyadh	6	1	5	462	549	−87	7 (Note: Head-to-head on point differential: Al Nassr Riyadh 163–162 Al Sadd.)	Advance to semi-finals qualifiers	70–101	72–75	—	77–78
4	(Qatar) Al Sadd	6	1	5	519	553	−34	7		84–94	94–99	84–86	—

Source: FIBA Gulf
Rules for classification: 1) Points; 2) Head-to-head results; 3) Points difference; 4) Points scored.
Notes:

20 December 2022	Kuwait Club	99–93(OT)	(Qatar) Al Sadd	Kuwait City
18:00	Scoring by quarter: 29–16, 18–26, 21–27, 18–17, Overtime: 13–7
	Pts: Pullen, Georges-Hunt 22; Rebs: Lalanne 16; Asts: Pullen 6	Boxscore	Pts: Austin 26; Rebs: Austin 16; Asts: Blue 10	Arena: Shaikh Saad Alabdullah Sport Hall Complex; Attendance: 300; Referees: Ahmed Ali Yaseen Al-Shuwaili (IRQ), Taha Al-Hashedi (YEM), Mohammed Ismail Altarawneh (JOR)

20 December 2022	Al Nassr Riyadh (Saudi Arabia)	72–75	(Bahrain) Manama Club	Riyadh
20:00	Scoring by quarter: 23–27, 7–10, 21–22, 21–16
	Pts: Austin 29; Rebs: Austin 12; Asts: Brown 3	Boxscore	Pts: Al Derazi 18; Rebs: Robinson 10; Asts: Al Derazi 3	Arena: Green Basketball Court; Attendance: 950; Referees: Rabah Noujaim (LBN), Mohammad Fawzi Taha (JOR), Paul Skayem (LBN)

27 December 2022	Manama Club (Bahrain)	88–91	Kuwait Club	Manama
18:00	Scoring by quarter: 17–23, 26–18, 17–27, 28–23
	Pts: Robinson 22; Rebs: García 8 Asts: Ulmer, Rashed 3	Boxscore	Pts: Georges-Hunt 22; Rebs: Lalanne 9 Asts: Hasan, Georges-Hunt 5	Arena: BBA Arena; Attendance: 900; Referees: Rabah Noujaim (LBN), Paul Skayem (LBN), Taha Al-Hashedi (YEM)

27 December 2022	Al Nassr Riyadh (Saudi Arabia)	77–78	(Qatar) Al Sadd	Riyadh
20:00	Scoring by quarter: 17–17, 30–17, 12–27, 18–17
	Pts: Brown 21; Rebs: Campbell 13; Asts: Almuhanna 6	Boxscore	Pts: Austin 21; Rebs: Austin 19; Asts: Blue 7	Arena: Green Basketball Court; Attendance: 200; Referees: Ahmed Ali Yaseen Al-Shuwaili (IRQ), Mohammad Fawzi Taha (JOR), Mohammed Ismail Altarawneh (JOR)

9 January 2023	Al Sadd (Qatar)	94–99(OT)	(Bahrain) Manama Club	Doha
19:00	Scoring by quarter: 21–20, 20–24, 19–21, 26–21, Overtime: 8–13
	Pts: Blue 27; Rebs: Dieng 13; Asts: Blue 7	Boxscore	Pts: Mohamed 20; Rebs: Ulmer, García 10; Asts: García 5	Arena: Al-Gharafa Sports Club Multi-Purpose Hall; Attendance: 469; Referees: Rabah Noujaim (LBN), Mohammad Doost (IRN), Paul Skayem (LBN)

10 January 2023	Kuwait Club	106–83	(Saudi Arabia) Al Nassr Riyadh	Kuwait City
19:30	Scoring by quarter: 30–19, 21–18, 23–25, 32–21
	Pts: Pullen 31; Rebs: Lalanne 17; Asts: Hasan 7	Boxscore	Pts: Brown 23; Rebs: Campbell 7 Asts: Kabe 5	Arena: Shaikh Saad Alabdullah Sport Hall Complex; Referees: Ahmed Ali Yaseen Al-Shuwaili (IRQ), Wissam Zein (SYR), Taha Al-Hashedi (YEM)

23 January 2023	Manama Club (Bahrain)	105–74	(Saudi Arabia) Al Nassr Riyadh	Manama
18:00	Scoring by quarter: 24–19, 30–22, 20–23, 31–10
	Pts: García 18; Rebs: Ulmer 12; Asts: Robinson 7	Boxscore	Pts: Brown 27; Rebs: Austin 6 Asts: Brown 6	Arena: BBA Arena; Attendance: 400; Referees: Rabah Noujaim (LBN), Paul Skayem (LBN), Hadi Salem (IRN)

24 January 2023	Al Sadd (Qatar)	84–94	Kuwait Club	Doha
19:00	Scoring by quarter: 26–28, 14–19, 22–20, 22–27
	Pts: Dieng 24; Rebs: Austin 18; Asts: Blue 6	Boxscore	Pts: Lalanne 20; Rebs: Lalanne 14; Asts: Hasan, Georges-Hunt 4	Arena: Al-Gharafa Sports Club Multi-Purpose Hall; Attendance: 99; Referees: Ahmed Ali Yaseen Al-Shuwaili (IRQ), Mohammad Doost (IRN), Anan Daraghman (PLE)

13 March 2023	Kuwait Club	106–78	(Bahrain) Manama Club	Kuwait City
19:30	Scoring by quarter: 28–17, 22–20, 30–11, 26–30
	Pts: Pullen 24; Rebs: Lalanne 12; Asts: Pullen 4	Boxscore	Pts: Taylor 24; Rebs: Taylor 6 Asts: Jones, Alderazi 3	Arena: Shaikh Saad Alabdullah Sport Hall Complex; Referees: Rabah Noujaim (LBN), Wissam Zein (SYR), Paul Skayem (LBN)

14 March 2023	Al Sadd (Qatar)	84–86	(Saudi Arabia) Al Nassr Riyadh	Doha
19:00	Scoring by quarter: 22–22, 23–15, 18–25, 21–24
	Pts: Blue 23; Rebs: Austin 16; Asts: Blue 6	Boxscore	Pts: Abo-Jalas 20; Rebs: Abo-Jalas 12; Asts: Austin 8	Arena: Al-Gharafa Sports Club Multi-Purpose Hall; Attendance: 69; Referees: Rabah Noujaim (LBN), Paul Skayem (LBN), Wissam Zein (SYR)

21 March 2023	Manama Club (Bahrain)	98–86	(Qatar) Al Sadd	Manama
18:00	Scoring by quarter: 14–26, 30–21, 34–23, 20–16
	Pts: Jones 25; Rebs: Taylor 9 Asts: Jones 9	Boxscore	Pts: Blue 32; Rebs: Austin 12; Asts: Austin 5	Arena: BBA Arena; Referees: Rabah Noujaim (LBN), Mohammad Doost (IRN), Hadi Salem (IRN)

21 March 2023	Al Nassr Riyadh (Saudi Arabia)	70–101	Kuwait Club	Riyadh
20:00	Scoring by quarter: 14–33, 21–21, 17–21, 18–26
	Pts: Thomas 25; Rebs: Thomas 18; Asts: Thomas 4	Boxscore	Pts: Jawhar 21; Rebs: Lalanne 12; Asts: Pullen 9	Arena: Green Basketball Court; Attendance: 150; Referees: Harja Jaladri (INA), Ahmed Ali Yaseen Al-Shuwaili (IRQ), Mohammad Fawzi Taha (JOR)

== Final phase ==
=== Bracket ===
Qualification to semifinals
B2	(Bahrain) Manama Club	69
A3	(Kuwait) Kazma	83
A2	(United Arab Emirates) Shabab Al Ahli	100
B3	(Saudi Arabia) Al Nassr Riyadh	90

Semifinals
A1	(Saudi Arabia) Al Hilal	78
B2	(Bahrain) Manama Club	82
B1	Kuwait Club	87
A2	(United Arab Emirates) Shabab Al Ahli	71

Finals
B2	(Bahrain) Manama Club	78
B1	Kuwait Club	87
Third place game
A1	(Saudi Arabia) Al Hilal	76
A2	(United Arab Emirates) Shabab Al Ahli	88

=== Qualification to semifinals ===
All match-ups are best-of-three playoffs.

==== (B2) Manama Club vs. (A3) Kazma ====
27 March 2023
22:00

Box Scores

Manama Club (Bahrain)	69–83	(Kuwait) Kazma
Scoring by quarter: 30–17, 8–21, 17–23, 14–22
Pts: Jones 22; Rebs: Thibodeaux 17; Asts: Thibodeaux 5		Pts: Alhamidi, Williams 18; Rebs: Mejri 11; Asts: Borhamah 6
Kazma leads series, 1–0

BBA Arena, Manama
Attendance: 1,700
Referees: Rabah Noujaim (LBN), Harja Jaladri (INA), Yu Jung (TPE)

3 April 2023
22:00

Box Scores

Kazma (Kuwait)	90–100	(Bahrain) Manama Club
Scoring by quarter: 20–12, 18–43, 27–15, 25–30
Pts: Rector 17; Rebs: Mejri 17; Asts: Albaloushi 4		Pts: Hamooda 21; Rebs: Haji, Thibodeaux 7 Asts: Jones 11
series tied, 1–1

Shaikh Saad Alabdullah Sport Hall Complex, Kuwait City
Referees: Rabah Noujaim (LBN), Ahmed Ali Yaseen Al-Shuwaili (IRQ), Paul Skayem (LBN)

10 April 2023
22:00

Box Scores

Manama Club (Bahrain)	82–79	(Kuwait) Kazma
Scoring by quarter: 27–13, 16–20, 16–22, 23–24
Pts: Jones 32; Rebs: Thibodeaux 9 Asts: Jones 10		Pts: Rector 20; Rebs: Mejri 11; Asts: Albaloushi 6
Manama Club wins series, 2–1

BBA Arena, Manama
Attendance: 500
Referees: Rabah Noujaim (LBN), Harja Jaladri (INA), Yu Jung (TPE)

==== (A2) Shabab Al Ahli vs. (B3) Al Nassr Riyadh ====
28 March 2023
22:00

Box Scores

Shabab Al Ahli (United Arab Emirates)	100–90	(Saudi Arabia) Al Nassr Riyadh
Scoring by quarter: 23–21, 28–27, 26–16, 23–26
Shabab Al Ahli leads series, 1–0

Sheikh Saeed Bin Maktoum Sports Hall, Dubai
Attendance: 100
Referees: Rabah Noujaim (LBN), Harja Jaladri (INA), Yu Jung (TPE)

4 April 2023
22:00

Box Scores

Al Nassr Riyadh (Saudi Arabia)	68–67	(United Arab Emirates) Shabab Al Ahli
Scoring by quarter: 14–14, 20–24, 18–14, 16–15
series tied, 1–1

Al Nasr Stadium, Riyadh
Attendance: 100
Referees: Rabah Noujaim (LBN), Ahmed Ali Yaseen Al-Shuwaili (IRQ), Paul Skayem (LBN)

11 April 2023
22:00

Box Scores

Shabab Al Ahli (United Arab Emirates)	93–71	(Saudi Arabia) Al Nassr Riyadh
Scoring by quarter: 24–16, 21–17, 28–15, 20–23
Shabab Al Ahli wins series, 2–1

Sheikh Saeed Bin Maktoum Sports Hall, Dubai
Attendance: 700
Referees: Rabah Noujaim (LBN), Harja Jaladri (INA), Yu Jung (TPE)

=== Semifinals ===
==== (A1) Al Hilal vs. (B2) Manama Club ====
17 April 2023
22:00

Box Scores

Al Hilal (Saudi Arabia)	78–82 (OT)	(Bahrain) Manama Club
Scoring by quarter: 18–16, 22–14, 18–23, 10–15, Overtime: 10–14
Manama Club leads series, 1–0

Green Basketball Court, Riyadh
Attendance: 300
Referees: Rabah Noujaim (LBN), Ahmed Ali Yaseen Al-Shuwaili (IRQ), Paul Skayem (LBN)

24 April 2023
22:00

Box Scores

Manama Club (Bahrain)	86–71	(Saudi Arabia) Al Hilal
Scoring by quarter: 16–21, 22–9, 27–25, 21–16
Manama Club wins series, 2–0

BBA Arena, Manama
Attendance: 1,150
Referees: Yu Jung (TPE), Mohammad Doost (IRN), Wissam Zein (SYR)

==== (B1) Kuwait Club vs. (A2) Shabab Al Ahli ====
18 April 2023
22:00

Box Scores

Kuwait Club	87–71	(United Arab Emirates) Shabab Al Ahli
Scoring by quarter: 21–16, 15–18, 23–20, 28–17
Kuwait Club leads series, 1–0

Shaikh Saad Alabdullah Sport Hall Complex, Kuwait City
Referees: Rabah Noujaim (LBN), Ahmed Ali Yaseen Al-Shuwaili (IRQ), Paul Skayem (LBN)

25 April 2023
20:00

Box Scores

Shabab Al Ahli (United Arab Emirates)	100–110	Kuwait Club
Scoring by quarter: 23–29, 29–33, 23–19, 25–29
Kuwait Club wins series, 2–0

Sheikh Saeed Bin Maktoum Sports Hall, Dubai
Attendance: 325
Referees: Yu Jung (TPE), Mohammad Doost (IRN), Wissam Zein (SYR)

==== Third place game ====
8 May 2023
20:00

Box Scores

Al Hilal (Saudi Arabia)	76–88	(United Arab Emirates) Shabab Al Ahli
Scoring by quarter: 17–21, 22–23, 14–19, 23–25

Sheikh Saeed Bin Maktoum Sports Hall, Dubai
Attendance: 700
Referees: Rabah Noujaim (LBN), Ahmed Ali Yaseen Al-Shuwaili (IRQ), Mohammed Taha (JOR)

==== Finals ====
9 May 2023
22:00

Box Scores

Kuwait Club	87–78	(Bahrain) Al Manama
Scoring by quarter: 24–16, 19–14, 23–25, 21–23
Kuwait Club leads series, 1–0

Shaikh Saad Alabdullah Sport Hall Complex, Kuwait City
Referees: Rabah Noujaim (LBN), Ahmed Ali Yaseen Al-Shuwaili (IRQ), Mohammed Taha (JOR)

15 May 2023
20:00

Box Scores

Al Manama (Bahrain)	85–95	Kuwait Club
Scoring by quarter: 22–24, 17–23, 24–17, 22–31
Kuwait Club wins championship, 2–0

Khalifa Sports City Stadium, Manama
Referees: Ahmed Ali Yaseen Al-Shuwaili (IRQ), Mohammad Doost (IRN), Paul Skayem (LBN)
