= C. J. Leslie =

American basketball player

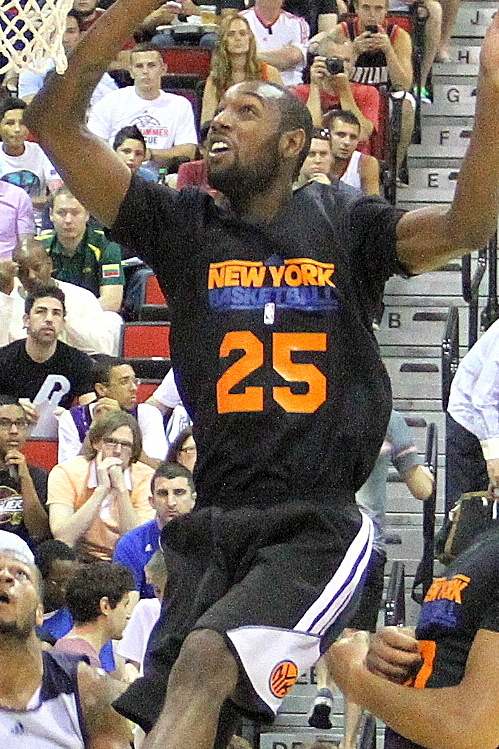
- Leslie with the Knicks during the 2013 NBA Summer League

Personal information
- Born: June 25, 1991 (age 35) Holly Springs, North Carolina, U.S.
- Listed height: 6 ft 9 in (2.06 m)
- Listed weight: 209 lb (95 kg)

Career information
- High school: Word of God Christian Academy (Raleigh, North Carolina)
- College: NC State (2010–2013)
- NBA draft: 2013: undrafted
- Playing career: 2013–2021
- Position: Power forward

Career history
- 2013–2014: Erie BayHawks
- 2014: Idaho Stampede
- 2014: Anyang KGC
- 2015: GlobalPort Batang Pier
- 2015: Mets de Guaynabo
- 2015: Hapoel Eilat
- 2016: Petrolina AEK Larnaca
- 2016–2017: Raptors 905
- 2017: Byblos Club
- 2017–2018: Antalya BSB
- 2018–2019: Texas Legends
- 2020: Al-Hilal
- 2020–2021: Al-Nasr

Career highlights
- NBA D-League champion (2017); NBA D-League All-Rookie Third Team (2014); Second-team All-ACC (2012); Third-team All-ACC (2013); ACC All-Freshman team (2011); Second-team Parade All-American (2010); McDonald's All-American (2010)
- Stats at Basketball Reference

Calvin "C. J." Leslie (born June 25, 1991) is an American former professional basketball player. He played college basketball for North Carolina State.

== High school career ==
Leslie attended Word of God Christian Academy for three years where he played with John Wall for two of those three. In his senior year, he was selected to participate in the McDonald's All-American Game and the Jordan Brand Classic.

== College career ==
Leslie signed with North Carolina State out of high school. As a freshman at North Carolina State, Leslie was second on the team in points per game averaging 11.0 points, also leading the Wolfpack in rebounding averaging 7.2 rebounds per game. At the end of the season, Leslie was named to the ACC All-Freshmen Team. During his sophomore season he led the team in scoring averaging 14.7 points per game. Also Leslie was one of only three ACC players to place in the top ten in scoring, field goal percentage, and rebounding. Due to his play all season he garnered an All-ACC Second Team selection. During his junior season, Leslie again led the Wolfpack in scoring, averaging 15.1 points per game, which was seventh in the conference. He also added 7.4 rebounds per game, which was tied for eighth in the conference. After the season Leslie was selected to the All-ACC Third Team. In 2011–12 and 2012–13, Leslie helped the Wolfpack to back to back NCAA tournament appearances, the first time the school had done so since the 2005–06 season.

== Professional career ==
After going undrafted in the 2013 NBA draft, Leslie signed a partially guaranteed contract with the New York Knicks on July 8, 2013 and played for them at the Las Vegas Summer League. He was later waived by the Knicks on October 25 after appearing in five preseason games.

On October 31, 2013, Leslie was acquired by the Erie BayHawks of the NBA Development League. On February 26, 2014, he was traded to the Idaho Stampede.

In July 2014, Leslie was acquired by Anyang KGC in the 2014 KBL draft. He played 18 games for the club before departing in late November. In January 2015, he joined GlobalPort Batang Pier for the 2015 Commissioner's Cup. In four games for GlobalPort, he averaged 29.3 points and 14.3 rebounds per game.

On February 14, 2015, Leslie signed with Puerto Rican team Mets de Guaynabo.

In July 2015, Leslie joined the Sacramento Kings for the 2015 NBA Summer League. On August 12, 2015, he signed with Hapoel Eilat of the Israeli League.

On January 21, 2016, Leslie signed with Cypriot team Petrolina AEK Larnaca.

On October 30, 2016, Leslie was acquired by Raptors 905 of the NBA Development League.

On May 1, 2019, Leslie was drafted in the 2nd round of the Big3 draft by Bivouac.

On March 1, 2020, Leslie was reported to have signed with Al-Hilal. On November 1, he signed with Al-Nasr.

== Personal life ==
Leslie's younger sister Kiara is also a professional basketball player.
