= Ahmed Samater =

Saudi Arabian basketball player

Personal information
- Born: January 13, 1980 (age 46) Khobar, Eastern Province, Saudi Arabia
- Listed height: 6 ft 6 in (1.98 m)
- Listed weight: 240 lb (109 kg)

Career information
- Playing career: 2003–2015
- Position: Power forward, center

Ahmed Samater (Arabic: أحمد سمتر; born 13 January 1980 in Khobar, Eastern Province, Saudi Arabia) is a professional Saudi Arabian basketball player. He plays for the Al-Hilal Sports Club of the D1 Saudi Arabia.

== Career overview ==
Ahmed Samater grew up in Khobar, Eastern Province, Saudi Arabia. Throughout his career he played professional basketball in Saudi Arabia and Bahrain. Altogether, he played professional basketball for the following teams:

- 2005-08 Al Qadsia
- 2004-05 Al Ahli Manama
- 2009–14 Al Hilal Riyadh
- 2014-15 Al Nasr

== Achievements ==
- 2004-05, 2011 Saudi Arabia national basketball team
