= Shakir Smith (basketball) =

American basketball player (born 1992)

No. 5 – Al Bashaer
- Position: Guard
- League: Oman Basketball League

Personal information
- Born: October 25, 1992 (age 34) Tucson, Arizona, U.S.
- Listed height: 6 ft 1 in (1.85 m)
- Listed weight: 160 lb (73 kg)

Career information
- High school: Tucson (Tucson, Arizona)
- College: Wyoming (2011–2012); Pima CC (2012–2013); Adams State (2014–2016)
- Playing career: 2016–present

Career history
- 2016–2018: Academic Bultex
- 2018: Blokotehna
- 2018–2019: Norrköping
- 2019: AV Ohrid
- 2019–2020: Academic Bultex
- 2020–2021: Sporting CP
- 2021: ÍR
- 2021–2022: Sporting CP
- 2022–2023: CD Estela
- 2023–2024: BK Aktobe
- 2024–present: Al Bashaer

Shakir Smith (born October 25, 1992) is an American professional basketball player for Al Bashaer of the Oman Basketball League. He played college basketball at Wyoming from 2011 to 2012, Pima CC from 2013 to 2014 and Adams State from 2014 to 2016.

== College career ==
As a senior at Adams State in 2015-16 Smith averaged 20.7 points, 2.5 rebounds and 3.3 assists in 30.7 minutes in 28 appearances.

== Professional career ==
After graduating, on August 10, 2016, Smith signed with Academic Bultex of Bulgarian League. On April 15, 2017, he was named MVP of Bulgarian League. On February 2, 2018, he signed with Macedonian basketball club Blokotehna. He made his debut for Blokotehna against Macedonian basketball champion MZT Skopje on February 5, 2018, scoring 8 points and two rebounds in 96–88 win over MZT at home. Smith signed for Swedish champions Norrköping Dolphins on July 21, 2018, for the 2018–2019 season.

In August 2021, Smith signed with Úrvalsdeild karla club ÍR. On September 3, he scored 51 points in a preseason game against Njarðvík. He was released from his contract in end of November 2021 after averaging 15.1 points and 8.7 assists in seven games.
