= Assembe Ndoum Samuel Wilfried =

Cameroonian basketball player and coach

Assembe Ndoum Samuel Wilfried (born in Douala, Cameroon) is a Cameroonian basketball coach and previously a professional basketball player.

He began his sports career as a professional basketball talents in 1998, as a player in international leagues, in Africa, South America and the Middle East. He played in Estrella del este (Paraguay), Universitad Catolica (Santiago de Chile, Chile), Fedeguayas (Guayaquil, Ecuador) and Saba Mehr (Teheran, Iran) amongst others.

He became a professional basketball coach starting 2011 starting with the Ghana female national basketball team at the 2011 FIBA African Nations Cup also known as Afrobasket 2011. The same year, he became head coach for Al Ahly Sidab of Muscat, Oman Basketball League for the 2011-2012 season. In 2012-2013 he was head coach of Al Safa club of Safwa, that plays in the Saudi Premier League. In 2013-2014, he moved as assistant coach at Al Salam club in Saudi Arabia, also in the Saudi division 1 league.

He has also college coaching experience in the United States as second assistant of Los Angeles Prep (LAPC) basketball team for a few months before Was intern coach at Loyola Marymount University in 2014-2015 season.

He is also involved with NBA Basketball Without Border Camp since 2006 as coach translator. The camp is promoted by the NBA on all continents every year to promote basketball. He worked as director of scouting in Africa with Advanced Scouting International for three years, scouting High School and Colleges prospect for NCAA Schools. He is currently an international scout consultant for the Orlando Magic in charge of France and Africa since November 2015. In October 2015 was appointed as an Assistant coach in the Cameroon Female Team (Fédération camerounaise de basket-ball) taking part in the FIBA Women's Olympic Qualifying Tournament 2016 in Nantes, France, and left the position just after the Olympic's qualifying tournament.
