= Slaven Čupković =

Serbian basketball player

Al Bashaer
- Position: Power forward
- League: Oman Basketball League

Personal information
- Born: 23 June 1988 (age 38) Mostar, SFR Yugoslavia
- Listed height: 2.07 m (6 ft 9 in)
- Listed weight: 300 lb (136 kg)

Career information
- NBA draft: 2010: undrafted
- Playing career: 2005–present

Career history
- 2005–2010: Mašinac Kraljevo
- 2010–2012: Napredak Kruševac
- 2012–2013: Rosa Radom
- 2013–2014: Sloga
- 2014: Kožuv
- 2014–2015: Aries Trikala
- 2015–2016: Aris Thessaloniki
- 2016–2017: Kymis
- 2017–2018: Panionios
- 2018: Sloga
- 2018–2019: Kolossos Rodou
- 2019–2020: Alba Fehérvár
- 2020–2021: Sloga
- 2021–2022: Burgan SC
- 2022–2023: Slodes
- 2023: Spartak Office Shoes
- 2023–2024: Tamiš
- 2024: OKK Dunav
- 2024–present: Al Bashaer
Medals
Men's basketball
Representing Serbia
U19 World Cup
Gold medal – first place	2007 Serbia	U19 Team

Slaven Čupković (Serbian Cyrillic: Славен Чупковић; born 23 June 1988) is a Serbian professional basketball player who plays for Al Bashaer. He is 2.07 m (6 ft 9 1/2 in) tall.

== Professional career ==
On 19 August 2014 Čupković joined Aries Trikala, signing a one-year deal with the club. Čupković signed to play in Greece, with Aris of the Greek Basket League and EuroCup, in 2015. On 1 July 2016 he joined the newly promoted protest to the Greek Basket League Kymis.

In July 2019, Čupković signed for Alba Fehérvár of the Hungarian League.

== National team career ==
Čupković was a member of the junior national teams of Serbia. With Serbia's Under-19 national team, he won the gold medal at the 2007 FIBA Under-19 World Cup.
