= Mike Iezzi =

American football coach (born c. 1966)

Current position
- Title: Special teams coordinator, defensive tackles coach
- Team: Greeneville HS (TN)

Biographical details
- Born: c. 1966 (age 59–60); Camden, New Jersey, U.S.
- Education: Kean University (1989); Ohio University (2013)

Playing career
- 1985–1988: Kean
- Position: Linebacker

Coaching career (HC unless noted)
- 1989: Kean (OLB)
- 1990: Kean (ST/DL)
- 1991: Kean (ILB)
- 1992–1994: Kean (DC/LB)
- 1995–1996: Kean (AHC/DC)
- 1997: Saint Peter's (DC/LB)
- 1998: Saint Peter's (DC/DB)
- 1999–2000: Pace (DC/LB/DB)
- 2001–2004: Pace (AHC/DC/LB/DB)
- 2005–2009: Pace
- 2010: Philadelphia Phoenix
- 2011: East Stroudsburg (DL)
- 2012–2013: Tusculum (DC/DB)
- 2014–2015: Tusculum (DC/LB)
- 2020–present: Greeneville HS (TN) (ST/DT)

Head coaching record
- Overall: 12–39 (college)

Michael Iezzi (born c. 1966) is an American college football coach. He is the special teams coordinator and defensive tackles coach for Greeneville High School; a position he has held since 2020. He was the head football coach for Pace University from 2005 to 2009 and for the semi-professional Philadelphia Phoenix in 2010. He also coached for Kean, Saint Peter's, East Stroudsburg, and Tusculum. He played college football for Kean as a linebacker.

== Head coaching record ==
=== College ===
Year	Team	Overall	Conference	Standing	Bowl/playoffs
Pace Setters (Northeast-10 Conference) (2005–2009)
2005	Pace	3–7	2–7	9th	
2006	Pace	3–7	2–7	8th	
2007	Pace	1–10	1–8	9th	
2008	Pace	4–6	3–4	5th	
2009	Pace	1–9	1–7	T–8th	
Pace:		12–39	9–33		
Total:		12–39			
