= Édgar Sosa (basketball) =

American basketball player (born 1988)

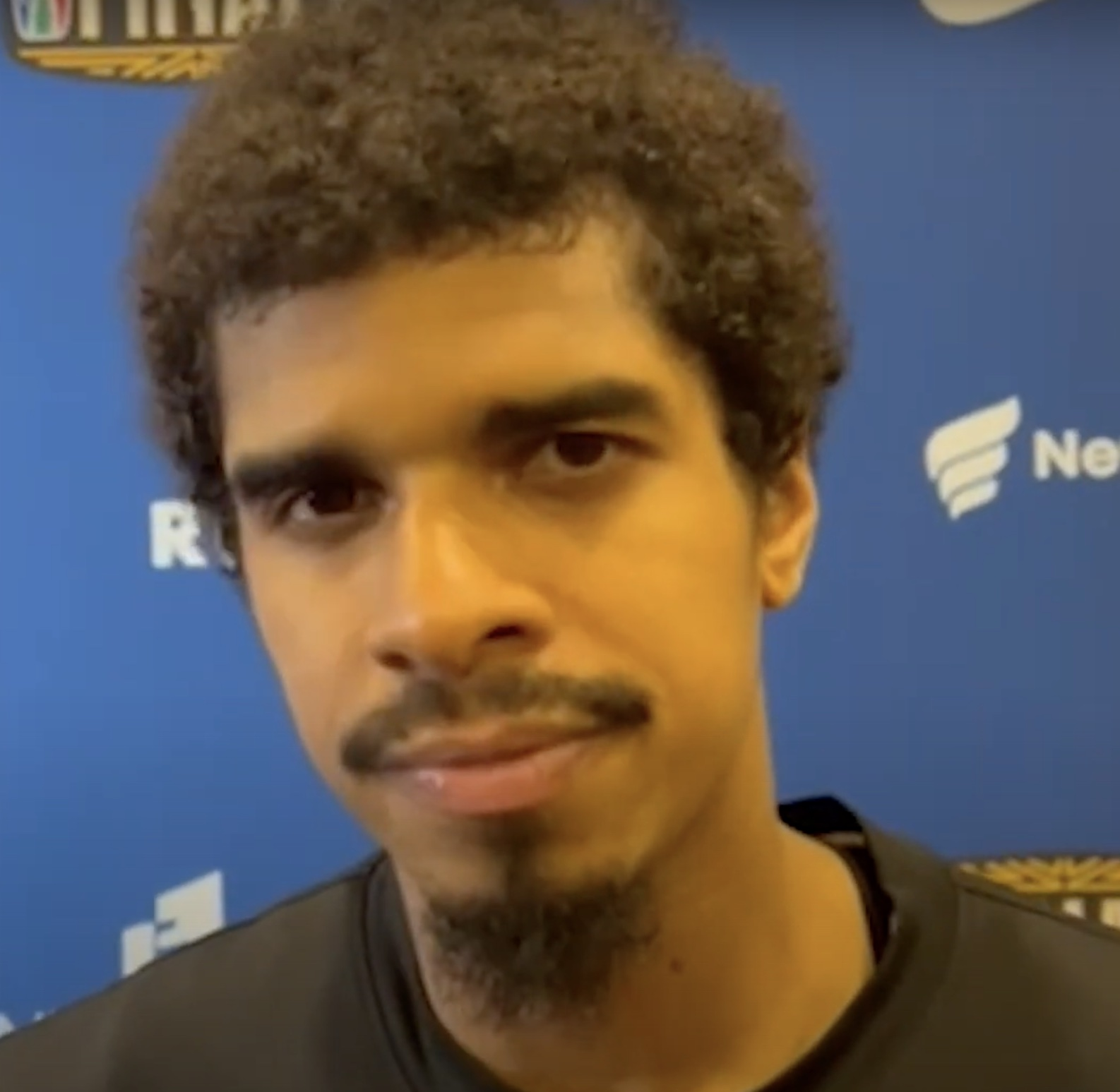
- Sosa in 2022

Al Riyadi
- Position: shooting guard
- League: Lebanese Basketball League

Personal information
- Born: January 15, 1988 (age 38) New York City, U.S.
- Listed height: 6 ft 2 in (1.88 m)
- Listed weight: 175 lb (79 kg)

Career information
- High school: Rice (New York City, New York)
- College: Louisville (2006–2010)
- NBA draft: 2010: undrafted
- Playing career: 2010–present

Career history
- 2010–2011: Angelico Biella
- 2012: Reales de La Vega
- 2013: Blancos de Rueda Valladolid
- 2013: Cangrejeros de Santurce
- 2013: Leones de Santo Domingo
- 2013–2014: ratiopharm Ulm
- 2014–2015: Dinamo Sassari
- 2015–2016: Petrochimi Bandar Imam
- 2016: Hapoel Jerusalem
- 2016–2017: Juvecaserta
- 2017: Sporting Al Riyadi Beirut
- 2017–2018: New Zealand Breakers
- 2018: Reyer Venezia
- 2018–2019: BCM Gravelines-Dunkerque
- 2019–2020: Hapoel Gilboa Galil
- 2020–2021: Boulazac
- 2021: Rasta Vechta
- 2021–2022: Zamalek
- 2022–2023: Al-Naft
- 2023: Al Ahli Tripoli
- 2023–2024: Al-Fateh
- 2024–present: Al Riyadi

Career highlights
- All-BAL First Team (2022); FIBA Europe Cup champion (2018); Italian Serie A champion (2015); Italian Cup winner (2015); Italian Supercup winner (2014); Italian Serie A All-Star (2011); Iranian League champion (2016); Lebanese League champion (2017); All-NBL Second Team (2018); Big East All-Rookie Team (2007)
- Stats at Basketball Reference
Medals
Men's basketball
Representing Dominican Republic
FIBA AmeriCup
Bronze medal – third place	2011 Mar del Plata

Édgar Sosa (born January 15, 1988) is a Dominican-American professional basketball player for the Al Riyadi of the Lebanese Basketball League. He played college basketball for Louisville.

== High school and college career ==
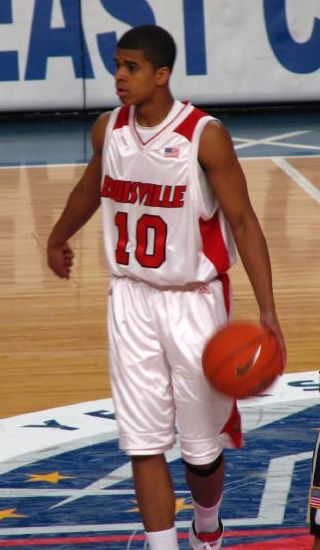
Sosa playing for the Cardinals in 2007

Sosa attended Rice High School in New York City, where he received All-American honors.

As a freshman at Louisville playing with Derrick Caracter, Earl Clark and Jerry Smith, the young group struggled early in the 2006–07 season. The team went on to win 8 out of its last 10 games, earning a bid to the NCAA Tournament. In the second round of the NCAA Tournament against Texas A&M, Sosa scored 31 points, shooting 15 for 17 from the line and 7 for 9 from the field. He also shot 15 for 15 on free throws to start the game, but missed his final two, as Texas A&M won the game.

In his four-year career at Louisville, Sosa played 140 games and averaged 9.7 points per game.

== Professional career ==
On July 23, 2010, Sosa signed a one-year deal with Italian Serie A team Angelico Biella. In June 2011, he parted ways with Biella.

On July 3, 2011, Sosa signed a one-year deal with Sutor Basket Montegranaro. However, after breaking his leg playing for the Dominican Republic at the 2011 FIBA Americas Championship in September, he was ruled out for six months. Sosa was subsequently replaced on Montegranaro's roster by Ben Uzoh.

In June 2012, Sosa joined Dominican team Reales de La Vega.

In January 2013, Sosa joined Blancos de Rueda Valladolid on a one-month contract. He later played in Puerto Rico for Cangrejeros de Santurce and in his home country for Leones de Santo Domingo.

On September 30, 2013, Sosa signed with ratiopharm Ulm of the German Basketball Bundesliga for the 2013–14 season.

On July 7, 2014, Sosa signed with Italian team Dinamo Sassari for the 2014–15 season.

On September 25, 2015, Sosa signed with the Atlanta Hawks. He was waived by the Hawks on October 10, 2015, after appearing in one preseason game. Later that month, he signed with Iranian team Petrochimi Bandar Imam. On April 16, 2016, a day after winning the Iranian Super League title with Petrochimi, Sosa signed with Israeli team Hapoel Jerusalem for the rest of the season.

On August 11, 2016, Sosa signed with Italian team Juvecaserta Basket for the 2016–17 season. On March 15, 2017, he parted ways with Juvecaserta after averaging 19.4 points, 2.8 rebounds and 5.9 assists per game in the Serie A. Three days later, he signed with Sporting Al Riyadi Beirut of the Lebanese Basketball League.

On July 26, 2017, Sosa signed with the New Zealand Breakers for the 2017–18 NBL season. On March 14, 2018, he signed with Reyer Venezia Mestre of the Lega Basket Serie A.

On June 8, 2018, Sosa signed with BCM Gravelines-Dunkerque of the French LNB Pro A. In 18 games played during the 2018–19 season, he averaged 13.2 points and 5.2 assists per game.

On August 24, 2019, Sosa returned to Israel for a second stint, signing with Hapoel Gilboa Galil for the 2019–20 season. On January 12, 2020, Sosa recorded a season-high 38 points, while shooting 6-of-10 from three-point range, along with four rebounds and four assists in a 98–93 win over his former team Hapoel Jerusalem. He was subsequently named Israeli League Round 15 MVP.

On July 26, 2020, he signed with Boulazac Basket Dordogne of LNB Pro A.

On February 16, 2021, he signed with Rasta Vechta of the Basketball Bundesliga. Sosa averaged 16.5 points, 3.4 assists, and 2.0 rebounds per game.

On September 2, 2021, he signed with Zamalek of the Egyptian Basketball Super League. On May 28, he was named to the All-BAL First Team of the 2022 season, helping Zamalek to a third place with a team leading 18.5 points per game.

On September 18, 2022, Sosa joined Al-Naft SC of the Iraqi Basketball League.

On December 19, 2024, Sosa signed with the Al Riyadi of the Lebanese Basketball League.

== National team career ==
Sosa made his debut for the Dominican national team in 2011. In 2014, he represented the Dominican Republic at the FIBA Basketball World Cup in Spain.

== Career statistics ==
Legend
GP	Games played	GS	Games started	MPG	Minutes per game
FG%	Field-goal percentage	3P%	3-point field-goal percentage	FT%	Free-throw percentage
RPG	Rebounds per game	APG	Assists per game	SPG	Steals per game
BPG	Blocks per game	PPG	Points per game	PIR	Performance index rating
**Bold**	Career high

=== EuroLeague ===
Year	Team	GP	GS	MPG	FG%	3P%	FT%	RPG	APG	SPG	BPG	PPG	PIR
2014–15	Sassari	10	0	22.9	.361	.282	.719	1.4	4.2	.3	.0	10.4	6.7
Career		10	0	22.9	.361	.282	.719	1.4	4.2	.3	.0	10.4	6.7

== See also ==
- 2006 boys high school basketball All-Americans
