= Antwaine Wiggins =

American basketball player (born 1988)

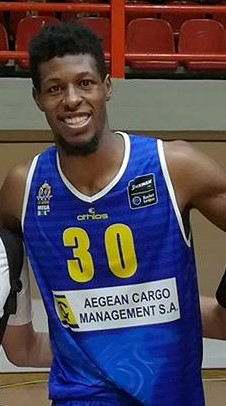
- Wiggins in action with Lavrio

Al-Naft
- Position: Small forward / power forward
- League: Iraqi League

Personal information
- Born: December 23, 1988 (age 37) Kinston, North Carolina
- Listed height: 6 ft 8 in (2.03 m)
- Listed weight: 200 lb (91 kg)

Career information
- High school: Greeneville (Greeneville, Tennessee)
- College: College of Charleston (2007–2012)
- NBA draft: 2012: undrafted
- Playing career: 2012–present

Career history
- 2012–2014: Palmeiras
- 2015–2016: Platense
- 2016–2017: Raptors 905
- 2017–2018: Lavrio
- 2018–2019: Ifaistos Limnou
- 2019–2020: PAOK
- 2021–2022: Al Ahli
- 2022–present: Al Naft

Career highlights
- NBA D-League champion (2017); Iraqi League champion (2023); Iraqi League MVP (2023); Iraqi League Best Defender (2023); Iraqi Perseverance Cup winner (2023); Second-team All-SoCon (2012)

Antwaine Jermaine Wiggins (born December 23, 1988) is an American professional basketball player for Al Naft. He is a multi-position player. His extreme athleticism, versatility and length allows him to play shooting guard, small forward or power forward. After four successful years at Charleston, Wiggins entered the 2012 NBA draft but was not selected in the draft's two rounds.

== High school career ==
Wiggins played high school basketball at Greeneville High School, in Greeneville, Tennessee.

== College career ==
Wiggins played four seasons at Charleston, his senior year averaging 15.9 points, 6.5 rebounds, 2.2 assists and 1.1 steals per game.

NCAA Awards and Honors

Best Perimeter Defenders In Nation by CBSSports.com (2012)

Second-team All-SoCon (2012)

All-SoCon Team (Coaches) (2012)

All-SoCon Team (Media) (2012)

== Professional career ==
2012–2014 After going undrafted in the 2012 NBA draft, Wiggins joined the top league team of Palmeiras in São Paulo, Brazil. He started for the team for 2 years until 2014.

2015–2016 On August 31, 2015, Wiggins joined Platense in Buenos Aires, Argentina. Wiggins helped lead the team into the quarterfinals of the playoffs. Wiggins was on TNA's (Torneo Nacional Ascenso Argentina), Top 10 list for both scorers and rebounds. Wiggins averaged 17.9 ppg, 8.1 rebounds, 1.1 assists and 1 block per game.

2016–2017 The following season, Wiggins was selected from the Raptors 905 in the 2nd round, the 43rd overall pick in the 2016 NBA Development League Draft under coach and former NBA All-Star Jerry Stackhouse. With the Raptors, he won the NBA D-League championship. In Toronto he only averaged 18.7 minutes but maintained a decent average of 8.7 ppg.

2017–2018 On July 20, 2017, Wiggins joined Lavrio of the Greek Basket League. He was invited to the 2018 Greek All-Star Game where he performed in the dunk contest. He finished his first regular season in the Greek league with 11 points, 5 rebounds. In playoffs he had a very successful series averaging 21 points, 9.5 rebounds, 3 blocks, and 2.5 assists.

2018–2019 On August 11, 2018, Wiggins signed with another Greek team, Ifaistos Limnou and remained in the Greek Basket League.

2019–2020 On August 30, 2019, Wiggins signed with his third Greek club, PAOK Thessaloniki. On January 23, 2020, the two sides amicably parted ways.

2021–2022 In October 2021 Antwaine signed with Al Ahli in Doha Qatar. Wiggins was as able to set a record by scoring 60 points on December 5, 2021.

2022–2023 In September 2022 Antwaine signed with Al Naft. Wiggins and his team won the Iraqi Championship where he was able to walk away with 3 awards including MVP, best defensive player and best foreign player. Al Naft also participated in the FIBA WASL tournament where Wiggins finished the season as the most efficient player of the league and the leagues 2nd leading scorer.

== Personal life ==
Antwaine Wiggins is related to former NBA and overseas basketball player Mitchell Wiggins. Mitchell Wiggins is the father of current NBA star Andrew Wiggins, current overseas basketball player Nick Wiggins and former overseas basketball player Mitchell Wiggins Jr. Antwaine is cousins with Andrew, Nick and Mitch Jr.
