= Clint Chapman =

American basketball player (born 1989)

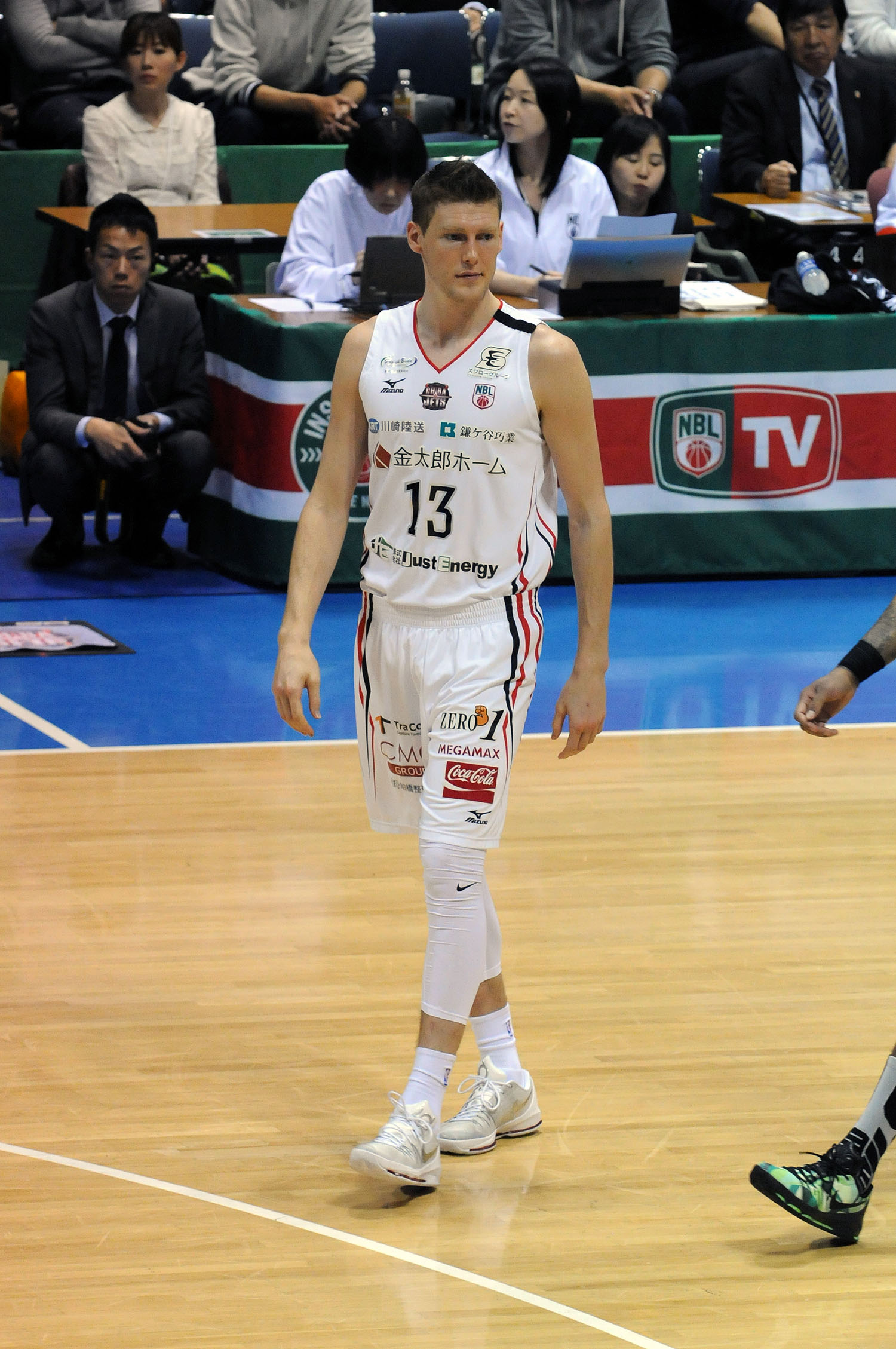
- Chapman with Chiba Jets in 2016

No. 13 – Dorados de Chihuahua
- Position: Power forward
- League: LNBP

Personal information
- Born: March 6, 1989 (age 37) Medford, Oregon, U.S.
- Listed height: 6 ft 10 in (2.08 m)
- Listed weight: 245 lb (111 kg)

Career information
- High school: Canby (Canby, Oregon)
- College: Texas (2007–2012)
- NBA draft: 2012: undrafted
- Playing career: 2012–present

Career history
- 2012–2013: SAM Basket Massagno
- 2013: Vestelspor Manisa
- 2013–2014: Fribourg Olympic
- 2014–2015: Hiroshima Dragonflies
- 2015–2016: Chiba Jets
- 2016–2017: Niigata Albirex BB
- 2017–2018: Hiroshima Dragonflies
- 2018: Toyama Grouses
- 2018: Alba Berlin
- 2018–2019: Riesen Ludwigsburg
- 2019: Rasta Vechta
- 2019–2020: Victoria Libertas Pesaro
- 2021–2022: Medipolis SC Jena
- 2022–2023: Al Hilal
- 2023: Al Sadd
- 2023–2024: Kazma SC
- 2024–2025: Manama Club
- 2025–2026: CS Antonine
- 2026: Magnolia Chicken Timplados Hotshots
- 2026–present: Dorados de Chihuahua
- Stats at Basketball Reference

Clinton Daniel Chapman (born March 6, 1989) is an American professional basketball player for the Dorados de Chihuahua of the Liga Nacional de Baloncesto Profesional (LNBP). He played college basketball for the Texas Longhorns.

Chapman has competed in more than 400 international basketball games, playing overseas in over a dozen European and Asian leagues. He has scored over 6,000 points and collected over 3,000 rebounds in his international career.

On July 19, 2024, Chapman signed with Sagesse SC of the Lebanese Basketball League. On October 17, 2024, Chapman signed with Manama Club of the Bahraini Premier League and West Asia Super League. On March 24, 2026, Chapman signed with the Magnolia Chicken Timplados Hotshots of the Philippine Basketball Association to replace Nuni Omot as its import for the 2026 PBA Commissioner's Cup.

== Career statistics ==
Legend
GP	Games played	GS	Games started	MPG	Minutes per game
FG%	Field goal percentage	3P%	3-point field goal percentage	FT%	Free throw percentage
RPG	Rebounds per game	APG	Assists per game	SPG	Steals per game
BPG	Blocks per game	PPG	Points per game	**Bold**	Career high

Year	Team	GP	GS	MPG	FG%	3P%	FT%	RPG	APG	SPG	BPG	TO	PPG
NBL 2014–15	Hiroshima D	54	31	22.3	.425	.333	.800	7.3	0.8	**0.9**	1.2	1.9	15.20
NBL 2015–16	Chiba	57	**40**	22.4	.498	.331	.777	7.79	0.8	0.8	1.2	**2.1**	16.90
B League 2016–17	Niigata	**60**	36	**24.2**	.449	.401	.718	**8.25**	**0.9**	0.5	1.7	1.9	**18.92**
EuroCup 2018–19	Alba Berlin	8	8	17.5	.526	.167	**.950**	4.75	0.88	.25	**1.2**	1.0	10.00
EasyCredit BBL 2018–19	Alba Berlin	8	7	15.8	.571	**.444**	.875	4.50	0.50	.25	0.5	1.3	9.380
EasyCredit BBL 2019	Rasta Vechta	13	8	13.7	**.620**	.429	.744	3.00	0.69	.31	.23	1.1	11.92
