= Rasoul Mozafari =

Iranian basketball player

No. 1 – Shahrdari Gorgan
- Position: Point guard
- League: IBSL

Personal information
- Born: July 22, 1994 (age 32) Shahrekord, Iran
- Listed height: 6 ft 2 in (1.88 m)
- Listed weight: 190 lb (86 kg)

Career information
- NBA draft: 2016: undrafted
- Playing career: 2012–present

Career history
- 2012–2013: Esteghlal Qeshm
- 2013–2014: Afra Khalij-e-Fars
- 2014–2018: Azad University Tehran
- 2018–2019: Palayesh Naft Abadan
- 2019–2020: Petrochimi Bandar Imam
- 2020–2021: Palayesh Naft Abadan
- 2021–present: Shahrdari Gorgan

Career highlights
- Iranian League champion (2022)

Rasoul Mozaffari Vanani (Persian: رسول مظفری ونانی; born 22 July 1994), known as Rasoul Mozaffari (رسول مظفری), is an Iranian professional basketball player for Petrochimi Bandar Imam in the Iranian Super League as well as for the Iranian national basketball team.

== Professional career ==
Mozafari played the 2016–17 season at the Azad University Tehran Basketball club, he averaged 4.24 points, 1.41 rebounds and 1.12 assists. In the 2017–18 season, he averaged 6.92 points, 3.08 rebounds and 1.42 assists. He moved to Naft Abadan BC in the 2018–19 season. He moved to Petrochimi Bandar Imam in the 2019 season.

== National team career ==
=== Junior teams ===
Mozafari represented the Iranian Under 19 team at the 2013 FIBA Under-19 World Championship, he averaged 1.6 points, 0.4 rebounds and 0.3 assists.

=== Senior team ===
Mozaffari represented the Iranian national basketball team at the 2019 FIBA Basketball World Cup in China, he averaged 3 points, 0.8 rebounds and 1.3 assists. He participates in the 2021 FIBA Asia Cup qualification.
