= 2021–22 Iranian Basketball Super League =

Locations of the 2021–22 season teams

The 2021–22 Iran Super League season was the 32nd season of the Iranian basketball league. Shahrdari Gorgan won the title.

== Regular season ==
=== Group A ===
Pos	Team	Pld	W	L	PF	PA	PD	Pts
1	Shahrdari Gorgan	14	12	2	1139	959	+180	26
2	Zob Ahan Isfahan	14	12	2	1148	986	+162	26
3	Sanat Mes Kerman	14	9	5	1118	1027	+91	23
4	Nazmavaran Sirjan	14	9	5	1121	1052	+69	23
5	Kalleh Mazandaran	14	7	7	1054	1019	+35	21
6	Palayesh Naft Abadan	14	4	10	1003	1068	−65	18
7	Khaneh Basketball Khuzestan	14	3	11	890	1059	−169	16
8	Niroo Zamini Tehran	14	0	14	877	1180	−303	14

Source: IRIBF

Home \ Away	KAL	KBK	NAZ	NIR	NAF	SMK	SHG	ZOB
Kalleh Mazandaran	—	77–53	70–76	86–67	62–59	79–93	68–92	80–69
Khaneh Basketball Khuzestan	68–76	—	64–90	78–59	71–76	69–63	0–20	58–80
Nazmavaran Sirjan	88–82	82–79	—	105–93	74–68	92–95	76–84	75–76
Niroo Zamini Tehran	59–80	69–73	43–80	—	66–76	52–82	68–95	57–93
Palayesh Naft Abadan	48–63	90–86	63–75	84–65	—	83–100	66–91	70–73
Sanat Mes Kerman	71–63	94–55	54–55	81–69	98–87	—	80–93	68–78
Shahrdari Gorgan	88–86	91–70	80–54	78–66	74–70	82–86	—	81–85
Zob Ahan Isfahan	88–82	92–66	101–99	89–44	70–63	70–53	84–90	—

Source: IRIBF
Legend: Blue = home team win; Red = away team win.
Matches with lighter background shading were decided after overtime.

=== Group B ===
Pos	Team	Pld	W	L	PF	PA	PD	Pts
1	Mahram Tehran	14	12	2	1082	921	+161	26
2	Chemidor Qom	14	12	2	1172	872	+300	26
3	Sanat Mes Rafsanjan	14	10	4	1031	1027	+4	24
4	Foolad Sepahan Isfahan	14	6	8	1072	1107	−35	20
5	Avijeh Sanat Parsa Mashhad	14	6	8	1024	1050	−26	20
6	Raad Padafand Tehran	14	4	10	997	1128	−131	18
7	Exxon Tehran	14	3	11	912	1054	−142	17
8	Sanaye Hormozgan	14	3	11	928	1059	−131	17

Source: IRIBF

Home \ Away	AVI	CHE	EXX	FMS	MAH	RAD	SMR	SAN
Avijeh Sanat Parsa Mashhad	—	79–91	80–65	67–72	74–71	87–82	78–73	70–82
Chemidor Qom	76–66	—	84–50	98–77	62–67	89–50	76–55	87–42
Exxon Tehran	60–68	63–88	—	66–62	66–70	61–70	70–74	72–63
Foolad Sepahan Isfahan	86–68	60–75	89–72	—	94–105	103–101	55–64	69–66
Mahram Tehran	71–55	71–69	92–57	79–66	—	89–74	82–67	77–63
Raad Padafand Tehran	71–66	59–101	67–61	90–83	59–82	—	71–77	64–73
Sanat Mes Rafsanjan	84–83	64–86	76–73	81–74	67–62	88–75	—	76–74
Sanaye Hormozgan	66–83	69–90	71–76	75–82	48–64	68–64	68–85	—

Source: IRIBF
Legend: Blue = home team win; Red = away team win.
Matches with lighter background shading were decided after overtime.

== Second round ==
=== Group C ===
Home \ Away	EXX	KAL	SMR	SHG
Exxon Tehran	—	81–67	73–79	51–81
Kalleh Mazandaran	88–82	—	66–80	82–99
Sanat Mes Rafsanjan	64–69	76–94	—	73–77
Shahrdari Gorgan	88–61	95–99	78–69	—

Source: IRIBF
Legend: Blue = home team win; Red = away team win.
Matches with lighter background shading were decided after overtime.

=== Group D ===
Home \ Away	AVI	KBK	MAH	SMK
Avijeh Sanat Parsa Mashhad	—	90–79	85–83	78–67
Khaneh Basketball Khuzestan	46–89	—	82–87	69–75
Mahram Tehran	66–54	84–59	—	106–58
Sanat Mes Kerman	81–86	77–56	71–79	—

Source: IRIBF
Legend: Blue = home team win; Red = away team win.
Matches with lighter background shading were decided after overtime.

=== Group E ===
Home \ Away	CHE	NAZ	NIR	RAD
Chemidor Qom	—	63–60	83–63	88–55
Nazmavaran Sirjan	68–70	—	88–72	74–54
Niroo Zamini Tehran	55–80	56–83	—	67–74
Raad Padafand Tehran	73–89	55–85	69–73	—

Source: IRIBF
Legend: Blue = home team win; Red = away team win.
Matches with lighter background shading were decided after overtime.

=== Group F ===
Home \ Away	FMS	NAF	SAN	ZOB
Foolad Sepahan Isfahan	—	77–69	57–63	61–84
Palayesh Naft Abadan	82–84	—	86–84	75–83
Sanaye Hormozgan	80–77	85–89	—	81–92
Zob Ahan Isfahan	96–79	95–74	87–86	—

Source: IRIBF
Legend: Blue = home team win; Red = away team win.
Matches with lighter background shading were decided after overtime.

=== Standings ===
==== Group A ====
Pos	Team	Pld	W	L	PF	PA	PD	Pts	Qualification
1	Zob Ahan Isfahan	20	18	2	1685	1442	+243	38	Qualification to playoffs
2	Shahrdari Gorgan	20	17	3	1657	1394	+263	37	Qualification to playoffs
3	Nazmavaran Sirjan	20	13	7	1579	1422	+157	33	Qualification to playoffs
4	Sanat Mes Kerman	20	11	9	1547	1501	+46	31	Qualification to playoffs
5	Kalleh Mazandaran	20	10	10	1550	1532	+18	30	Qualification to playoffs
6	Palayesh Naft Abadan	20	6	14	1478	1576	−98	26	Qualification to playoffs
7	Khaneh Basketball Khuzestan	20	3	17	1281	1561	−280	22	Qualification to playoffs
8	Niroo Zamini Tehran	20	1	19	1263	1657	−394	21	Qualification to playoffs

Source: IRIBF

==== Group B ====
Pos	Team	Pld	W	L	PF	PA	PD	Pts	Qualification
1	Chemidor Qom	20	18	2	1645	1246	+399	38	Qualification to playoffs
2	Mahram Tehran	20	17	3	1587	1330	+257	37	Qualification to playoffs
3	Sanat Mes Rafsanjan	20	12	8	1472	1484	−12	32	Qualification to playoffs
4	Avijeh Sanat Parsa Mashhad	20	11	9	1506	1472	+34	31	Qualification to playoffs
5	Foolad Sepahan Isfahan	20	8	12	1507	1581	−74	28	Qualification to playoffs
6	Raad Padafand Tehran	20	5	15	1377	1604	−227	25	Qualification to playoffs
7	Exxon Tehran	20	5	15	1329	1521	−192	25	Qualification to playoffs
8	Sanaye Hormozgan	20	5	15	1407	1547	−140	25	Qualification to playoffs

Source: IRIBF

== Playoffs ==
1/8 finals
A1	Zob Ahan Isfahan	2
B8	Sanaye Hormozgan	0
B4	Avijeh Sanat Parsa Mashhad	1
A5	Kalleh Mazandaran	2
B2	Mahram Tehran	2
A7	Khaneh Basketball Khuzestan	0
A3	Nazmavaran Sirjan	2
B6	Raad Padafand Tehran	0
B1	Chemidor Qom	2
A8	Niroo Zamini Tehran	0
A4	Sanat Mes Kerman	2
B5	Foolad Sepahan Isfahan	1
A2	Shahrdari Gorgan	2
B7	Exxon Tehran	0
B3	Sanat Mes Rafsanjan	2
A6	Palayesh Naft Abadan	1

Quarterfinals
A1	Zob Ahan Isfahan	2
A5	Kalleh Mazandaran	0
B2	Mahram Tehran	1
A3	Nazmavaran Sirjan	2
B1	Chemidor Qom	2
A4	Sanat Mes Kerman	0
A2	Shahrdari Gorgan	2
B3	Sanat Mes Rafsanjan	0

Semifinals
A1	Zob Ahan Isfahan	3
A3	Nazmavaran Sirjan	0
B1	Chemidor Qom	1
A2	Shahrdari Gorgan	3

Final
A1	Zob Ahan Isfahan	1
A2	Shahrdari Gorgan	3
Third place
A3	Nazmavaran Sirjan	X
B1	Chemidor Qom	X

- The 3rd place playoff game between Nazmavaran Sirjan and Chemidor Qom, initially scheduled for 26 April, was canceled by mutual agreement. The two teams shared the 3rd place.

=== 1/8 finals ===
Team 1	Series	Team 2	Game 1	Game 2	Game 3
Zob Ahan Isfahan	2–0	Sanaye Hormozgan	73–70	87–71	
Avijeh Sanat Parsa Mashhad	1–2	Kalleh Mazandaran	76–69	64–79	76–85
Mahram Tehran	2–0	Khaneh Basketball Khuzestan	83–80	80–73	
Nazmavaran Sirjan	2–0	Raad Padafand Tehran	75–67	86–74	
Chemidor Qom	2–0	Niroo Zamini Tehran	90–72	95–44	
Sanat Mes Kerman	2–1	Foolad Sepahan Isfahan	81–65	72–84	73–61
Shahrdari Gorgan	2–0	Exxon Tehran	80–71	89–57	
Sanat Mes Rafsanjan	2–1	Palayesh Naft Abadan	73–83	90–88	87–73

=== Quarterfinals ===
Team 1	Series	Team 2	Game 1	Game 2	Game 3
Zob Ahan Isfahan	2–0	Kalleh Mazandaran	77–68	87–77	
Mahram Tehran	1–2	Nazmavaran Sirjan	67–89	90–87	66–73
Chemidor Qom	2–0	Sanat Mes Kerman	81–71	100–87	
Shahrdari Gorgan	2–0	Sanat Mes Rafsanjan	75–66	77–73	

=== Semifinals ===
Team 1	Series	Team 2	Game 1	Game 2	Game 3	Game 4	Game 5
Zob Ahan Isfahan	3–0	Nazmavaran Sirjan	77–71	81–80	65–55		
Chemidor Qom	1–3	Shahrdari Gorgan	72–81	84–85 (OT)	75–71	82–84	

=== Final ===
Team 1	Series	Team 2	Game 1	Game 2	Game 3	Game 4	Game 5
Zob Ahan Isfahan	1–3	Shahrdari Gorgan	64–72	89–87 (OT)	59–92	88–95	

25 April 2022
20:15

Report

Zob Ahan Isfahan	64–72	Shahrdari Gorgan
Scoring by quarter: 19–20, 17–16, 11–24, 17–12
Pts: Kazemi 16; Rebs: Kazemi 10; Asts: Aslani 5		Pts: Petty 32; Rebs: Mirzaei, Petty 7 Asts: Mozaffari, Petty 2

Azadi Basketball Hall, Tehran

27 April 2022
20:15

Report

Shahrdari Gorgan	87–89 (OT)	Zob Ahan Isfahan
Scoring by quarter: 21–20, 19–18, 13–22, 23–16, Overtime: 11–13
Pts: Petty 24; Rebs: Jamshidi 8 Asts: Petty 5		Pts: Zangeneh 23; Rebs: Kazemi 19; Asts: Mashayekhi 6

Azadi Basketball Hall, Tehran

29 April 2022
20:15

Report

Zob Ahan Isfahan	59–92	Shahrdari Gorgan
Scoring by quarter: 13–20, 11–22, 19–30, 16–20
Pts: Aslani 10; Rebs: Gholizadeh, Khalilnejad 5 Asts: Ahmadi, Akbari 2		Pts: Jamshidi, Petty 20; Rebs: Riaei, Petty 7 Asts: Petty 7

Azadi Basketball Hall, Tehran

1 May 2022
20:30

Report

Shahrdari Gorgan	95–88	Zob Ahan Isfahan
Scoring by quarter: 15–15, 28–19, 19–23, 33–31
Pts: Petty 41; Rebs: Mozaffari 10; Asts: Jamshidi, Riaei 2		Pts: Kazemi 30; Rebs: Kazemi 14; Asts: Mashayekhi 8

Azadi Basketball Hall, Tehran

== Imports ==
The following is the list of imports, which had played for their respective teams at least once, with the returning imports in italics.

Team	Player 1	Player 2	Replaced
Avijeh Sanat Parsa Mashhad	(Serbia) Luka Anđušić	(United States) Brian Starr	—
Chemidor Qom	(United States) Dwight Buycks	(Nigeria) Alade Aminu	(United States) Dion Wright (United States) Trey Zeigler
Exxon Tehran	(United States) Corin Henry	(Russia) Maxim Morozov	—
Foolad Sepahan Isfahan	—	—	—
Kalleh Mazandaran	(Serbia) Darko Balaban	(United States) Mike McCall	(United States) Ian Baker (Lithuania) Dainius Chatkevičius
Khaneh Basketball Khuzestan	(North Macedonia) Marko Simonovski	(Serbia) Dragan Tubak	(Ivory Coast) Adjehi Baru (United States) Darington Hobson
Mahram Tehran	(United States) DaJuan Summers	(Ukraine) Jerome Randle	(United States) Eli Holman
Nazmavaran Sirjan	(Russia) Anton Ponkrashov	(Serbia) Nikola Dragović	—
Niroo Zamini Tehran	—	—	—
Palayesh Naft Abadan	—	—	—
Raad Padafand Tehran	—	—	—
Sanat Mes Kerman	(Ukraine) Igor Chumakov	(United States) Isaiah Williams	—
Sanat Mes Rafsanjan	(United Kingdom) Robert Gilchrist	(United States) Alani Moore	—
Sanaye Hormozgan	(Ukraine) Kyrylo Fesenko	(United States) Kelvin Amayo	(United States) Julian Jacobs
Shahrdari Gorgan	(United States) Perry Petty	(Lithuania) Antanas Udras	(United States) Chris Evans
Zob Ahan Isfahan	—	—	—
