= Darrin Dorsey =

American basketball player (born 1987)

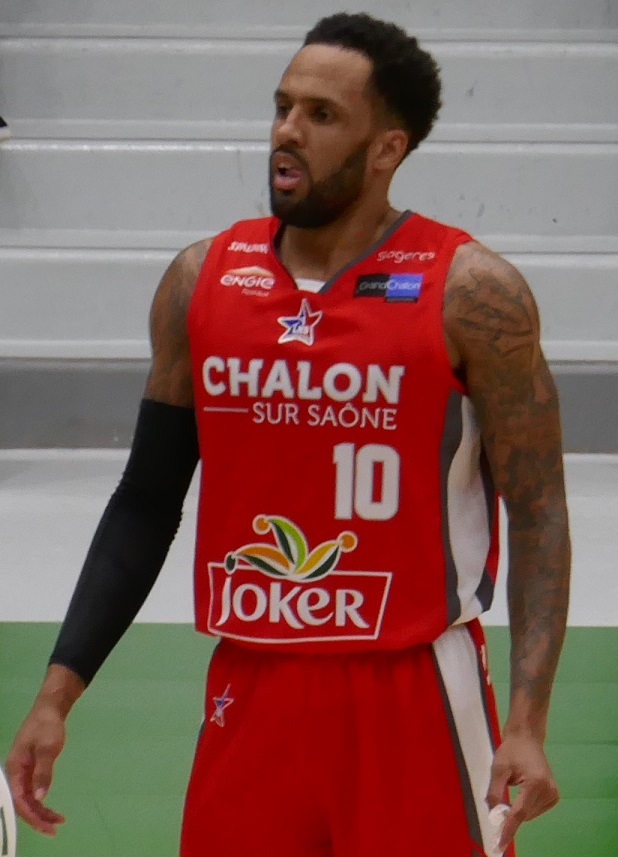

No. 10 – Nadim Souaid Academy
- Position: Point guard
- League: Lebanese Basketball League

Personal information
- Born: May 17, 1987 (age 39) Phoenix, Arizona, U.S.
- Listed height: 6 ft 2 in (1.88 m)
- Listed weight: 190 lb (86 kg)

Career information
- High school: Glendale (Glendale, Arizona)
- College: Bakersfield (2007–2009); Dakota Wesleyan (2008–2010); Berea College (2010–2011)
- NBA draft: 2011: undrafted
- Playing career: 2011–present

Career history
- 2011–2012: Halifax Rainmen
- 2012: Ostioneros de Guaymas
- 2012: Cafeteros de Armenia
- 2013–2014: Bambuqueros de Neiva
- 2014: Cafeteros de Armenia
- 2014–2015: Unión de Santa Fe
- 2015: Hapoel Kfar Saba
- 2015–2016: Poitiers
- 2016–2017: ESSM Le Portel
- 2017: Uşak Sportif
- 2017–2018: Élan Chalon
- 2018: Holargos
- 2018–2019: U-BT Cluj-Napoca
- 2019–2020, 2021: Neptūnas Klaipėda
- 2021: Abejas de León
- 2021–2022: Trefl Sopot
- 2022–2023: Al Sadd
- 2023: Orthodox
- 2024: Soles de Mexicali
- 2025–present: Nadim Souaid Academy
Medals
Men's basketball
Representing Cambodia
Southeast Asian Games
Gold medal – first place	2023 Cambodia	3x3
Silver medal – second place	2023 Cambodia	5x5

Darrin Dorsey (born May 17, 1987) is an American-born Cambodian professional basketball player for Nadim Souaid Academy of the Lebanese Basketball League. He is a 1.88 m. tall point guard.

== High school career ==
Dorsey played high school basketball at Glendale High School in Glendale, Arizona.

== College career ==
After high school, Dorsey played college basketball at Bakersfield, Dakota Wesleyan and Berea College from 2007 to 2011.

== Professional career ==
On September 7, 2015, he signed in France at Poitiers which is playing in the second division in 2015–2016 for 32,000 euros in season. In the 11th game, the team won its third consecutive victory by winning against Le Portel; Dorsey ends the match with 18 points in 7/10 shots including 2/4 at three points, 1 rebound and 4 assists in 29 minutes. The following weekend, Poitiers wins its fourth game in a row by beating Saint-Quentin; Dorsey had his best game with 30 points at 5/7 to 3-points shots, 6 rebounds and 2 assists for 30 devaluation in 36 minutes. He was named MVP of the January 2016 French Pro B championship with averages of 21 points, 4 rebounds and 4.5 assists over 34 minutes in the four league games of the month of January. His team beats Boulogne-sur-Mer and Dorsey was named MVP of the day finishing with 22 points to 7/8 to 5/8 shots including 3-pointers, 5 rebounds, 9 assists, 5 steals in 32 minutes. At the end of the season, the Poitiers club wanted to retain Dorsey but fails and replaces him with Steve McWhorter.

On August 5, 2016, he stays in France and signs at ESSM Le Portel, promoted to first division in 2016–2017. During a pre-season camp, he sprained his ankle. However, he managed to be reinstated for the first game of the season and the reception of Nanterre 92; his team lost 65–84 and Dorsey finished with 16 points (8 of 15 shots), 3 rebounds, 2 assists in 28 minutes. On October 22, 2017, he signed for the club Élan Chalon.

On July 24, 2018, he agreed to a deal with Greek team Holargos. He left the club during the season and joined U-BT Cluj-Napoca of the Liga Națională.

On August 12, 2019, he has signed with Neptūnas Klaipėda of the Lithuanian Basketball League.

On November 24, 2021, he has signed with Trefl Sopot of the Polish Basketball League.

== National team ==
Dorsey represented Cambodia at the 2023 Southeast Asian Games in 3x3 basketball helping win a gold medal for the host country.
