= Greeneville High School =

Location
- 210 Tusculum Boulevard; Greeneville, Tennessee; United States
- Coordinates: 36°09′55″N 82°49′30″W

Information
- Type: Public high school
- School district: Greeneville City Schools
- Principal: DeAnna Martin
- Teaching staff: 58.83 (FTE)
- Grades: 9–12
- Enrollment: 938 (2023–2024)
- Student to teacher ratio: 15.94
- Colors: Green; White
- Mascot: Greene Devil
- Website: ghs.gcschools.net

Greeneville High School (GHS) is a high school in Greeneville, Tennessee, a town most known as the place in which U.S. President Andrew Johnson began his political career as the city mayor. It is part of the Greeneville City School System, which includes all areas of the city limits. In 2008, it was named as a Blue Ribbon School, the only high school in Tennessee to receive such honor that year.

== Programs of study ==
GHS offers various academic programs to its students including Advanced Placement (AP) courses. Students taking AP courses may be eligible for college-level credit hours upon receiving a satisfactory score (specific to the college institution) on the Advanced Placement exams.

Students also have the opportunity to earn college-level course credit through GHS' partnership with Walters State Community College dual enrollment courses or the GEAP program which allows students to graduate high school with both a high school diploma as well as their associate degree.

== Extra-curricular offerings ==
=== Athletics ===
GHS offers sports teams including baseball/softball, basketball, football, bowling, cheerleading, cross country, dance team, golf, soccer, swim, tennis, track and field, volleyball, and wrestling.

The GHS football team won the Tennessee state football championships (Division 4A) in 2010, 2011, 2017 and 2018. Greeneville also won the women's soccer state championship in 2015 and 2016. The wrestling team has made 22 dual wrestling state appearances while winning A-AA team state in 2013 and was runner ups in 1995 (large school), 2014, and 2017. The wrestling team has thirteen individual state champions: Carson Dupill in 2022, LeAndre Dabney, Jr. in 2020, Brandon Lowery in 1997, Jeremy Garrett in 2000, Hunter Mason in 2021, Kodk Cannedy in 2020, Joel Brimer in 2008, Trent Knight in 2018 and 2019, Josh Barner in 1997, Morgan Lowery in 2023, Jason Riddle in 1999, Nick Foster in 2016, Daniel Crosby in 2002 and 2003.

== Notable alumni ==
- James Dobson – American actor (1920–1987)
- Park Overall – American actress and activist
- Antwaine Wiggins – American basketball player
- Ja'Kobi Gillespie – American basketball player (born 2004)
