= Al-Naft SC (basketball) =

Al-Naft
- League: Iraqi Basketball League
- Founded: 1979
- History: Al-Naft Sports Club (1979–present)
- Arena: Al-Shaab Hall
- Location: Baghdad, Iraq
- Team colours: Dark green, white, black
- Head coach: Khalid Dervish
- Ownership: Ministry of Oil (Iraq)

Al-Naft Sports Club (transl. Oil Sports Club) is an Iraqi professional basketball club based in the Al-Rusafa district in Baghdad. Owned and operated by the Ministry of Oil, the team plays in the Iraqi Basketball League and has won seven national league championships. The team is part of the Al-Naft SC sports club that also fields a football team. Home games of Al-Naft are played in the Al-Shaab Hall.

In 2022–23, Al-Naft played in the inaugural season of the West Asia Super League (WASL). In 2019 they had already played in the WABA Champions Cup and finished in the third place.

== Honours ==
Iraqi Basketball Premier League

- Champions (7): 1992–93, 2016–17, 2017–18, 2018–19, 2020–21, 2021–22, 2022–23

Iraqi Basketball Perseverance Cup

- Champions (4): 2017, 2019, 2021, 2023

WABA Champions Cup

- Third place (1): 2019

== Players ==
=== Current roster ===
As of 31 January 2023.

Note: Flags indicate national team, as has been defined under FIBA eligibility rules. Players may hold more than one non-FIBA nationality.

No.	Pos.	Nat.	Player
3	G	(Iraq) IRQ	Safaa Al Saedi
4	G	(Iraq) IRQ	Karrar Hamzah
7	G	(Iraq) IRQ	Jassim Al-Saadi
8	G	(Iraq) IRQ	Ahmed Alqaisi
11	F	(Iraq) IRQ	Hayder Aldiwani
12	G	(Dominican Republic) DOM	Édgar Sosa
14	C	(Iraq) IRQ	Khalid Al-Elayawi
15	F	(Iraq) IRQ	Mohammed Nahi
24	F	(Iraq) IRQ	Hashim Khzaae
30	F	(United States) USA	Antwaine Wiggins
34	G	(Iraq) IRQ	Abbas Al-Draisawi

=== Notable players ===
- (Dominican Republic) Édgar Sosa: (2022–23)
- (United States) Tony Mitchell: (2022–23)
- (United States) Antwaine Wiggins: (2022–23)
