= Al Hilal (basketball) =

Al-Hilal
- Nickname: Al-Za'eem (The Leaders); The Blue Waves
- League: Saudi Premier League; West Asia Super League
- Founded: 16 October 1957; 68 years ago
- Dissolved: 2024
- Arena: Prince Saud bin Jalawi Sports City Arena
- Location: Riyadh, Riyadh Province, Saudi Arabia
- Team colors: White, Blue and Navy
- Head coach: Felton Sealey
- Website: alhilal.com

Al Hilal (Arabic: نادي الهلال) is a former Saudi professional basketball club based in the city of Riyadh in the Riyadh Province, Saudi Arabia. It used to play in the Saudi Premier League. The club have played in the West Asia Super League, before being disbanded to reduce costs.

== Honours ==
=== Domestic ===
- Saudi Premier League (7):
  - 1977, 1990, 1992, 1993, 1994, 2022, 2024
- The elite Championship (5):
  - 1994, 1995, 1997, 1999, 2008

=== International ===
Arab Club Basketball Championship

- Third Place (1): 1996

== Players ==
=== Current roster ===
Note: Flags indicate national team eligibility at FIBA-sanctioned events. Players may hold other non-FIBA nationalities not displayed.

Al Hilal roster
Players
Coaches

Pos.	No.	Nat.	Name	Ht.	Age
SG	0	(Saudi Arabia)	Albargawi, Osama	1.88 m (6 ft 2 in)	27 – 7 December 1998
PG	4	(Saudi Arabia)	Alabbs, Zaid	1.90 m (6 ft 3 in)	34 – 9 April 1991
PG	5	(United States)	Griffin, Nick	1.89 m (6 ft 2 in)	30 – 27 February 1995
PF	9	(Saudi Arabia)	Hawsawi, Zakaria	1.91 m (6 ft 3 in)	38 – 12 December 1987
G	10	(Saudi Arabia)	Alabsi, Nasser	1.88 m (6 ft 2 in)	32 – 31 May 1993
C	12	(Saudi Arabia)	Alsuwailem, Mohammed	2.11 m (6 ft 11 in)	27 – 2 March 1998
C	13	(United States)	Chapman, Clint	2.08 m (6 ft 10 in)	36 – 6 March 1989
PG	21	(Saudi Arabia)	Abdel Gabar, Khalid	1.83 m (6 ft 0 in)	35 – 4 December 1990
SG	23	(Saudi Arabia)	Alotaibi, Mohamed	1.77 m (5 ft 10 in)	22 – 28 June 2003
PF	24	(Saudi Arabia)	Mgrshi, Abdulrahman	1.90 m (6 ft 3 in)	24 – 26 September 2001
PF	35	(Saudi Arabia)	Alsuwailem, Alwaleed	1.93 m (6 ft 4 in)	24 – 21 April 2001
SG	77	(Saudi Arabia)	Fadhil, Mustafa	1.86 m (6 ft 1 in)	28 – 7 April 1997

Head coach

(United States) Felton Sealey

Legend

- (C) Team captain
- Injured

=== Notable players ===
Note: Flags indicate national team eligibility at FIBA-sanctioned events. Players may hold other non-FIBA nationalities not displayed.

Criteria

To appear in this section a player must have either:

- Set a club record or won an individual award while at the club
- Played at least one official international match for their national team at any time
- Played at least one official NBA match at any time.

- (Saudi Arabia) Ahmed Samater
- (United States) Mark Lyons
- (United States) Clint Chapman

== See also ==
- Al Hilal SFC
