= Iraqi Professional Basketball League =

- Founded: 1980; 46 years ago
- Country: Iraq
- Federation: Iraqi Basketball Association
- Confederation: FIBA Asia (Asia)
- Number of teams: 11
- Level on pyramid: 1
- Relegation to: Iraqi Basketball First Division League
- Supercup: Iraqi Basketball Perseverance Cup
- International cup(s): Basketball Champions League Asia; FIBA West Asia Super League; Arab Club Basketball Championship
- Current champions: Al-Difaa Al-Jawi (5th title) (2025–26)
- Most championships: Al-Karkh (13 titles)
- Website: www.iraq.basketball

The Iraqi Professional Basketball League is the highest professional basketball league in Iraq.

The record winners of the competition are Al-Karkh, who have won the championship 13 times. Al-Difaa Al-Jawi are the current champions, having won their fifth title in the 2025–26 season by beating Zakho in the final.

== Current clubs ==
Team	City	Colour
Al-Difaa Al-Jawi	Baghdad	
Al-Karkh	Baghdad	
Al-Shorta	Baghdad	
Dijlah Al-Jamiea	Baghdad	
Al-Hashd Al-Shaabi	Baghdad	
Al-Kahrabaa	Baghdad	
Al-Hilla	Hilla	
Zakho	Zakho	
Ghaz Al-Shamal	Kirkuk	
Al-Tijara	Baghdad	
Darbandikhan	Sulaymaniyah	

== List of champions ==
No.	Season	Champion
1	1979–80	Al-Jaish
2	1980–81	Al-Karkh
3	1981–82	Al-Karkh
4	1982–83	Al-Karkh
5	1983–84	Al-Jaish
6	1984–85	Al-Karkh
7	1985–86	Al-Rasheed
8	1986–87	Al-Rasheed
9	1987–88	Al-Rasheed
10	1988–89	Al-Rasheed
11	1989–90	Al-Rasheed
12	1990–91	Al-Karkh
13	1991–92	Al-Karkh
14	1992–93	Al-Naft
15	1993–94	Al-Quwa Al-Jawiya
16	1994–95	Al-Shorta

No.	Season	Champion
17	1995–96	Al-Shorta
18	1996–97	Al-Karkh
19	1997–98	Al-Difaa Al-Jawi
20	1998–99	Al-Difaa Al-Jawi
21	1999–2000	Al-Karkh
22	2000–01	Al-Karkh
23	2001–02	Al-Karkh
24	2002–03	Al-Hilla
25	2003–04	Al-Hilla
26	2004–05	Al-Karkh
27	2005–06	Al-Kahrabaa
28	2006–07	Al-Hilla
29	2007–08	Al-Karkh
30	2008–09	Duhok
31	2009–10	Duhok
32	2010–11	Duhok

No.	Season	Champion
33	2011–12	Duhok
34	2012–13	Al-Kahrabaa
35	2013–14	Duhok
36	2014–15	Al-Shorta
37	2015–16	Al-Karkh
38	2016–17	Al-Naft
39	2017–18	Al-Naft
40	2018–19	Al-Naft
41	2019–20	Abandoned
42	2020–21	Al-Naft
43	2021–22	Al-Naft
44	2022–23	Al-Naft
45	2023–24	Al-Difaa Al-Jawi
46	2024–25	Al-Difaa Al-Jawi
47	2025–26	Al-Difaa Al-Jawi

=== Most successful clubs ===
Club	Titles	Winning seasons
Al-Karkh	13	1980–81, 1981–82, 1982–83, 1984–85, 1990–91, 1991–92, 1996–97, 1999–2000, 2000–01, 2001–02, 2004–05, 2007–08, 2015–16
Al-Naft	7	1992–93, 2016–17, 2017–18, 2018–19, 2020–21, 2021–22, 2022–23
Al-Rasheed	5	1985–86, 1986–87, 1987–88, 1988–89, 1989–90
Duhok	5	2008–09, 2009–10, 2010–11, 2011–12, 2013–14
Al-Difaa Al-Jawi	5	1997–98, 1998–99, 2023–24, 2024–25, 2025–26
Al-Hilla	3	2002–03, 2003–04, 2006–07
Al-Shorta	3	1994–95, 1995–96, 2014–15
Al-Jaish	2	1979–80, 1983–84
Al-Kahrabaa	2	2005–06, 2012–13
Al-Quwa Al-Jawiya	1	1993–94
