= Al-Nassr BC =

Al-Nassr
- League: Saudi Basketball League
- Arena: Green Basketball Court
- Location: Riyadh, Saudi Arabia
- Team colors: Yellow and Blue
- President: Abdullah Al-Majid
- Head coach: vacant

Al-Nassr active departments
Football (men's)	Football (women's)	Basketball (men's)

Al-Nassr is a Saudi professional basketball club based in Riyadh. The team plays in the Saudi Basketball League, the national top league, as well as in the West Asia Super League (WASL). The club plays their its home games at Green Basketball Court in Riyadh.

== History ==
Founded in 1955, Al Nassr has a competing basketball team. They won their first-ever Saudi championship after winning the Saudi Premier League in 2021. The team defeated Al Wahda in the finals, winning the third and decisive game on April 18, 2021.

The same year, Al Nassr played in the Gulf Clubs Championship where it reach the finals. Consequentially it qualified for the 2021 FIBA Asia Champions Cup, the first Saudi team do so in 10 years (the last being Al-Ittihad Jeddah in 2011). However the 2021 Asian tournament would be later cancelled.

In 2022, Al Nassr played in the inaugural season of the West Asia Super League.

== Honours ==
Type	Competition	Titles	Seasons
Domestic	Saudi Basketball League	1	2020–21
Domestic	Saudi Games	Silver Medal	2024

== Players ==
=== Current roster ===
Note: Flags indicate national team eligibility at FIBA-sanctioned events. Players may hold other non-FIBA nationalities not displayed.

Al Nassr roster
Players
Coaches

Pos.	No.	Nat.	Name	Ht.		Age
PG	1	(United States)	thomas, Marcus	1.90 m (6 ft 3 in)		30 – 27 July 1995
F	2	(Saudi Arabia)	Mohammed, Ahmed Abdullah	1.93 m (6 ft 4 in)		23 – 16 May 2002
SF	4	(United States)	Austin, Brandon	1.98 m (6 ft 6 in)		32 – 26 April 1994
SG	5	(Saudi Arabia)	Faqihi, Fahad	1.80 m (5 ft 11 in)		28 – 28 March 1998
PG	6	(Saudi Arabia)	Almuhanna, Turki	1.78 m (5 ft 10 in)		38 – 11 March 1988
F	7	(Saudi Arabia)	Aldawood, Turki	1.92 m (6 ft 4 in)		23 – 16 August 2002
G	8	(Saudi Arabia)	Almutairi, Salem	1.70 m (5 ft 7 in)		28 – 15 December 1997
SG	9	(Saudi Arabia)	Huraysi, Raed Yahya	1.80 m (5 ft 11 in)		34 – 13 June 1991
C	12	(United States)	Campbell, Antonio	2.06 m (6 ft 9 in)		31 – 24 December 1994
PF	13	(Saudi Arabia)	Lasloom, Mohammed Mesfer	1.91 m (6 ft 3 in)		40 – 4 August 1985
F/C	15	(Saudi Arabia)	Abo-Jalas, Nassir	1.96 m (6 ft 5 in)		31 – 11 June 1994
F	99	(Saudi Arabia)	Kadi, Musab Tariq	1.96 m (6 ft 5 in)		26 – 11 August 1999
G		(United States)	Russell, Cedric	1.88 m (6 ft 2 in)	86 kg (190 lb)	26 – 18 October 1999

Head coach

(Bosnia and Herzegovina) Mensur Bajramović

Legend

- (C) Team captain
- Injured
