= Oman Basketball League =

The Oman Basketball League (OBA) is a men's basketball league in the Sultanate of Oman.

== Teams ==
The league has six teams:

- Al Bashaer
- Ahli-Sidab
- Al Seeb
- Dhofar Club
- Nizwa
- Oman

== Finals ==
| Season | Champions | Runners-up | Score |
|---|---|---|---|
| 2020–21 | Al Bashaer | Nizwa | 74–65 |

== See also ==
- FIBA West Asia Super League
