= Aziz =

Name list

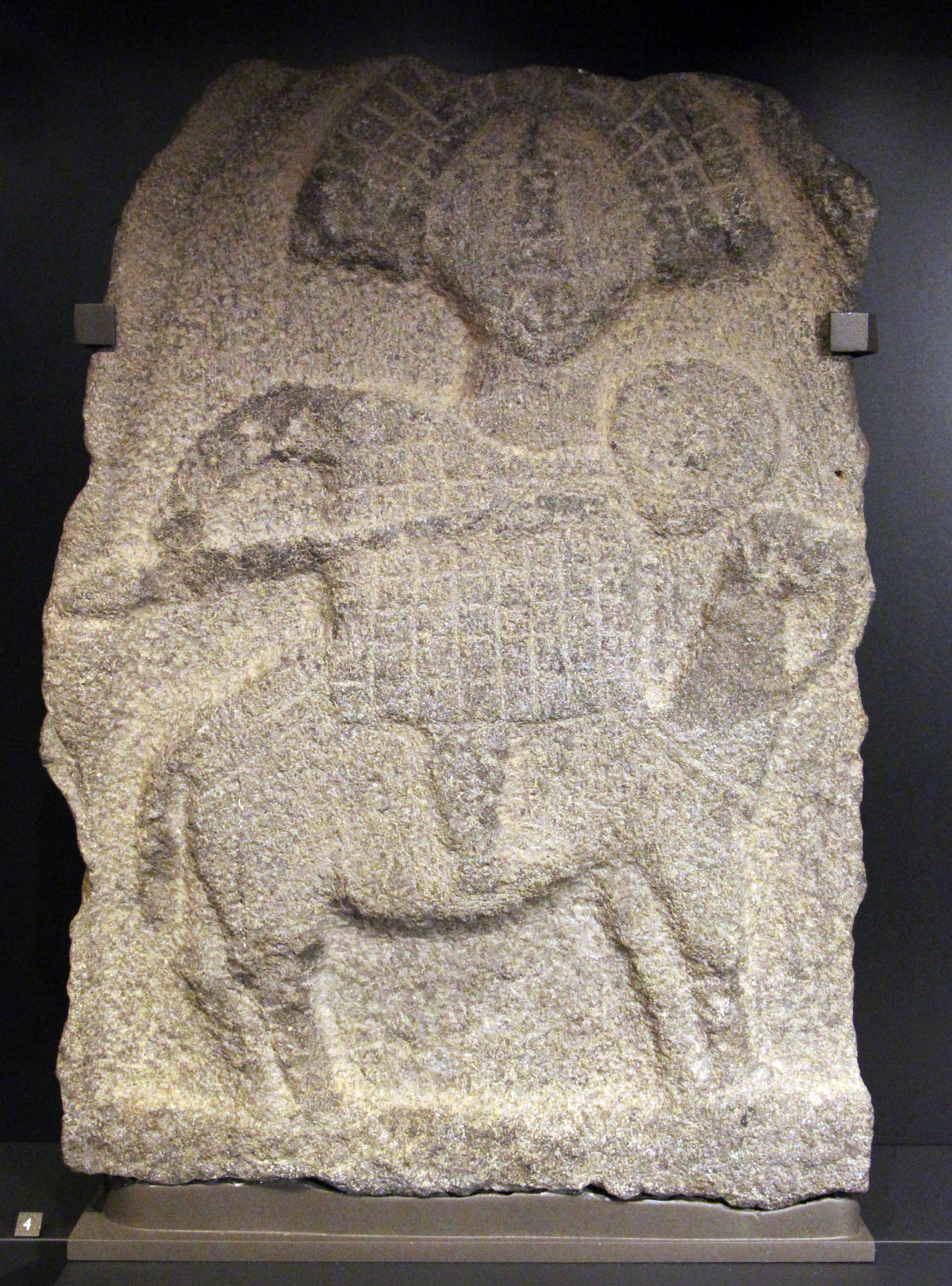
- Azizos, the god of the morning star
- Pronunciation: /aɪziz/ AE-zeez
- Gender: male
- Language: Assyrian (Aramaic; Akkadian), Arabic, Armenian, Balochi, Bengali, Chechen, Dari, Gujarati, Hebrew, Indonesian, Kazakh, Kurdish, Pashto, Persian, Punjabi, Somali, Turkish, Urdu, Zazaki

Other gender
- Feminine: Azizah; Muazzez

Origin
- Language: Semitic
- Meaning: 'reputable, powerful, sublime'
- Region of origin: Middle East

Other names
- Variant forms: Azaz; Azizus; Ezizu
- Nicknames: Azo; Azzy; Zyzz
- Related names: Azizos

Aziz (Arabic: عزيز, romanized: ʿAzīz; Hebrew: עָזִז, romanized: ʿAzīz; Akkadian: 𒀀𒍣𒍪, romanized: ʿEzīzū) is a Semitic name from the root two-zayin. In the Hebrew Bible, the root two-zayin (ז-ז) means 'reputable, powerful, sublime'. In the 1 Chronicles, Aziz was the son of Shema and the father of Bela. Azizus (Latinised), attested as an Arabian or Nabatean king who ruled Sampsigeramids of the Roman Empire.

In ancient Levantine mythology, Azizos is a god of the morning star of Aramean origin from Palmyra. The Arabian goddess Al-Uzza, related to the planet Venus, is named from the same root. Al-ʿAzīz is one of the names of God in Islam.

It is still used in existing Semitic languages such as Assyrian, Arabic, Hebrew, neo-Aramaic, Mandaic, and Maltese, and is found among Semitic speaking Christians, Jews, Muslims and Gnostics.

It later also spread to non-Semitic language families like Berber languages, Caucasus languages, Iranian languages, Indic languages, Turkic languages and among various language families in Sub-Saharan Africa and Southeast Asia.

Aziz is a common masculine given name, especially in the Muslim world, but it has also continued to be used by earlier pre-Islamic and non-Muslim peoples in the Middle East, like Jews, Assyrians, Arameans, Mandeans, Armenians, etc.

== Given name ==
=== Azeez ===
- Azeez Abu (born 1994), Nigerian beach soccer player
- Azeez Arisekola Adam (born 2003), Nigerian footballer
- Azeez Amida (born 1983), Nigerian business executive, author, and speaker
- Azeez Kayode Fakeye (born 1965), Nigerian sculptor
- Azeez Ladipo (born 1987), Nigerian rugby union player
- Azeez Mubarak (born 1951), Sri Lankan scientist and researcher
- Azeez Ojulari (born 2000), American football player
- Azeez Oseni (born 2002), Nigerian footballer
- Azeez Sait (1926–2001), Indian politician
- Azeez Al-Shaair (born 1997), American football player
- Azeez Shobowale Shobola (born 1992), Nigerian footballer
- Azeez Zainulabdeen (died 2010), Sri Lankan footballer

=== Aziz ===
- Aziz (artist) (born 1946), Indian artist and painter
- Aziz (qiyan), Umayyad poet and musician
- Aziz Ab'Sáber (1924–2012), Brazilian geographer
- Aziz Abaza (1898–1973), Egyptian poet
- Aziz Abbas (born 1943), Iraqi weightlifter
- Aziz Abbes Mouhiidine (born 1998), Italian boxer
- Aziz Abdelmassih (born 1996), Lebanese basketball player
- Aziz Abdo (born 1977), Lebanese singer, actor, and model
- Aziz Abduhakimov (born 1974), Uzbek politician
- Aziz al-Abub, Lebanese psychiatrist and medical torture expert
- Aziz Acharki (born 1972), Moroccan-born German taekwondo practitioner
- Aziz Ahmad, multiple people
- Aziz Mushabber Ahmadi (1932–2023), Indian judge
- Aziz Ahmed, multiple people
- Aziz Akbarian (born 1957), Iranian politician
- Aziz Akhannouch (born 1961), Moroccan politician, businessman, and billionaire
- Aziz Ali (born 1980), Kenyan boxer
- Aziz Aliyev (1896–1962), Azerbaijani Soviet politician and scientist
- Aziz Amoura (1944–2018), Jordanian-Palestinian artist and educator
- Aziz El Amri (born 1950), Moroccan football coach and player
- Aziz Ansah (born 1980), Ghanaian footballer
- Aziz Ansari (born 1983), American actor, comedian, and filmmaker
- Aziz Ben Askar (born 1976), French football manager and player
- Aziz Asli (1938–2015), Iranian footballer
- Aziz Atakhodjaev (born 1986), Uzbekistani para-cyclist
- Aziz Suryal Atiya (1898–1988), Egyptian coptologist
- Azizulhasni Awang (born 1988), Malay-Australian track cyclist
- Aziz Azim (born 1970), Moroccan footballer
- Aziz Azion, Ugandan R&B singer-songwriter, guitarist, and musician
- Aziz al-Azmeh (born 1947), Syrian academic
- Aziz Osman Bakir, Egyptian scout
- Aziz Balagoun (born 1981), Beninese footballer
- Aziz Behich (born 1990), Australian soccer player
- Aziz Beishenaliev (born 1971), Kyrgyz actor
- Aziz Mohammad Bhai (born 1962), Bangladeshi industrialist and film producer
- Aziz Binous (born 2000), Swiss footballer
- Aziz Bouderbala (born 1960), Moroccan footballer
- Aziz Bouhaddouz (born 1987), Moroccan footballer
- Aziz Çami (1893–1943), Albanian army officer
- Aziz Chouaki (1951–2019), French-Algerian writer and playwright
- Aziz Choudry (1966–2021), Canadian activist
- Aziz Deen-Conteh (born 1983), Sierra Leonean footballer
- Aziz Dadas (born 1968), Moroccan actor
- Aziz Daneshrad (1920–1991), Iranian Jewish political activist
- Aziz al-Dawla (died 1022), Fatimid governor of Aleppo
- Aziz Degga (1945–2019), Algerian actor, comedian, and writer
- Aziz Diagne (born 1957), Senegalese-born American artist
- Aziz Diya (1914–1997), Saudi writer, critic, translator, journalist, and broadcaster
- Aziz Djellouli (1896–1975), Tunisian politician and businessman
- Aziz Doufikar (born 1963), Moroccan footballer
- Aziz Dougaz (born 1997), Tunisian tennis player
- Aziz Dowlatabadi (1922–2009), Iranian poet
- Aziz Driouche (born 1977), Moroccan long-distance runner
- Aziz Dweik (born 1948), Palestinian politician, architect, and university professor
- Aziz Dyab (born 1995), Syrian-German actor
- Aziz Efendi, multiple people
- Aziz Espandar (born 1948), Iranian football player and coach
- Aziz Fahmy (1914–1991), Egyptian footballer
- Aziz Gardi (1947–2022), Iraqi-Kurdish writer, translator, and academic
- Aziz al-Hasan Ghouri (1884–1944), Indian Islamic scholar and poet
- Aziz Hajini (1957–2021), Kashmiri writer, poet, and critic
- Azizul Hakim (born 1959), Bangladeshi actor
- Azizul Haque, multiple people
- Aziz Harun (born 1998), Bruneian singer-songwriter and actor
- Aziz Herawi (1952–2011), Afghan musician
- Aziz Hitou (born 1990), Belgian futsal player
- Aziz Mahmud Hudayi (1541–1628), Ottoman Sufi saint
- Aziz Huq, American legal scholar
- Aziz Ibragimov (born 1986), Uzbek footballer
- Aziz Ibrahim (born 1964), British guitarist
- Aziz Imam (1925–1980), Indian politician and agriculturist
- Aziz Ishak (1915–1999), Malaysian politician, activist, and journalist
- Aziz Ismail (born 1988), Malaysian footballer
- Aziz Issah (born 2005), Ghanaian footballer
- Aziz İstegün, Turkish journalist
- Azizul Islam, multiple people
- Aziz Jahjah (born 1980), Belgian-Moroccan kickboxer
- Aziz Jaidi (born 1967), Moroccan police officer
- Aziz Jindani, Pakistani film director, screenwriter, producer, and computer graphics artist
- Aziz Kalkamanuly (born 1993), Kazakh judoka
- Aziz Kaprawi (born 1959), Malaysian politician
- Aziz Karimov (born 1987), Azerbaijani photographer
- Aziz Kayondo (born 2002), Ugandan footballer
- Aziz Kessous (1903–1965), Algerian lawyer, journalist, civil servant, and parliamentarian
- Aziz Khalfi (born 1973), Moroccan wrestler
- Aziz Khalouta (born 1989), Dutch-Moroccan footballer
- Aziz Khan, multiple people
- Aziz El Khanchaf (born 1977), French footballer
- Aziz Kocaoğlu (born 1948), Turkish politician
- Aziz Lahbabi (born 1991), Moroccan runner
- Aziz Hamid Madni (1922–1991), Pakistani poet and writer
- Aziz Maeboodi (born 1987), Iranian footballer
- Aziz Makiqi (1958–2024), Kosovar Yugoslav handball player and manager
- Aziz Malik (1916–??), Pakistani field hockey player
- Aziz Maraka (born 1983), Palestinian composer, singer, performer, and producer
- Aziz Mashaan (born 1988), Kuwaiti footballer
- Aziz Mekouar (1950–2026), Moroccan diplomat
- Aziz Mian (1942–2000), Pakistani musician
- Aziz Mirza (born 1947), Indian film director, producer, and screenwriter
- Aziz Ali al-Misri (1879–1965), Egyptian Ottoman military officer
- Aziz Mohammed (born 1987), Saudi writer
- Aziz Ouattara Mohammed (born 2001), Ivorian footballer
- Aziz Motazedi (born 1950), Iranian novelist and essayist
- Aziz Abdul Muniru, Ghanaian politician
- Aziz A. Munshi, Pakistani lawyer
- Aziz Naik (1936–2014), Pakistani field hockey player
- Aziz Abdul Naji (born 1975), Algerian Guantanamo detainee
- Aziz Naser (born 1980), Indian actor, writer, and voice artist
- Aziz Nasirzadeh (1964–2026), Iranian military officer
- Aziz Nesin (1915–1995), Turkish writer and humorist
- Aziz Saleh Al-Numan (1941–2024), Iraqi politician
- Aziz Corr Nyang (born 1984), Gambian footballer
- Aziz Orujov (born 1984), Azerbaijani journalist
- Aziz M. Osman (born 1962), Singaporean-Malaysian actor, director, screenwriter, and producer
- Aziz Ouakaa (born 1999), Tunisian tennis player
- Aziz Ouhadi (born 1984), Moroccan track and field athlete
- Aziz Pahad (1940–2023), South African politician and activist
- Aziz Ezzat Pasha (1869–1961), Egyptian politician
- Aziz Feyzi Pirinççizâde (1878–1933), Ottoman Kurdish politician
- Aziz Qaisi (1931–1992), Indian Urdu poet, short story writer, and film writer
- Aziz Qureshi (1941–2024), Indian politician
- Aziz Rabbah (born 1962), Moroccan politician
- Aziz Rana, American legal scholar and author
- Aziz-ur Rehman (1923–2014), Pakistani field hockey player
- Aziz-ur-Rehman (cricketer, born 1959) (born 1959), Pakistani cricketer
- Aziz-ur-Rehman (cricketer, born 1966) (born 1966), Pakistani cricketer
- Aziz Royesh (born 1969), Afghan Hazara social activist, teacher, and writer
- Aziz Sağlam (born 1982), Turkish-Belgian futsal player
- Aziz Sahmaoui (born 1962), Moroccan musician
- Aziz Salihu (born 1953), Kosovar boxer
- Aziz Sami (1895–1984), Iraqi writer and translator
- Aziz Sancar (born 1946), Turkish-American biologist
- Aziz Abu Sarah (born 1980), Palestinian peace activist, journalist, social entrepreneur, and politician
- Aziz Sattar (1925–2014), Malaysian actor, singer, comedian, and director
- Aziz Sedky (1920–2008), Egyptian politician and engineer
- Aziz Sejawal, Indian film director
- Aziz Seyidov (born 1956), Azerbaijani judge
- Aziz Aslam Shaikh (born 1956), Pakistani politician
- Aziz El-Shawan (1916–1993), Egyptian composer
- Aziz Shaykh, Khan of the Golden Horde
- Aziz Shittu (born 1994), American football player
- Aziz Shokhakimov (born 1988), Uzbek conductor
- Aziz Smati, Algerian television producer, director, and presenter
- Aziz al-Soltan (1879–1940), Iranian royal favourite
- Aziz Sydykov (born 1992), Kyrgyz footballer
- Aziz Tafer (born 1984), French-Algerian footballer
- Azizul Hakim Tamim (born 2007), Bangladeshi cricketer
- Aziz Tamoyan (1933–2021), Armenian-Yazidi politician
- Aziz Tazi, Moroccan screenwriter, director, and producer
- Aziz-ul-Rahman Usmani (1858/59–1928), Indian Sunni Muslim scholar
- Aziz Vrioni (1859–1920), Ottoman-Albanian politician
- Aziz Al-Yasiri (1945–2007), Iraqi politician
- Aziz Yıldırım (born 1952), Turkish businessman and civil engineer
- Aziz Zakari (born 1976), Ghanaian athlete
- Aziz Zoromba, Egyptian film director

== Surname ==
=== Azeez ===
- A. M. A. Azeez (1911–1973), Ceylonese civil servant, educator, social worker
- Ade Azeez (born 1994), English footballer
- Dan Azeez (born 1989), British boxer
- Fatima Azeez (born 1992), Nigerian badminton player
- K. P. A. C. Azeez (1934–2003), Indian film actor in Malayalam cinema
- Ramon Azeez (born 1992), Nigerian footballer
- Shabana Azeez (born 1996), Australian actress
- Shimna Azeez, Indian medical doctor

=== Aziz ===
- Aaron Aziz (born 1976), Singaporean actor
- Aly Abdel Aziz (born 1947), Egyptian squash player
- Arif Aziz (born 1943), Azerbaijan artist and educator
- Asif Aziz (born 1967), Malawi-born London landlord
- Dina Aziz, British–Bangladeshi influencer and writer
- Douglas Aziz (born 1942), Assyrian Iraqi footballer
- Fatima Aziz (1973–2021), Afghan physician and politician
- Gamal Aziz (born 1957/58), Egyptian-American businessman
- Iqra Aziz (born 1997), Pakistani actress
- Kamran Aziz (1922–2017), Cypriot musician, composer and pharmacist
- Lisa Aziz (born 1962), British TV presenter and journalism
- Michael Aziz, American engineer
- Mohamad Aziz (1940–2020), Malaysian politician
- Mohammad Aziz (1954–2018), Indian playback singer
- Omar Aziz (born 1958), Brazilian politician
- Philip Aziz (1923–2009), Canadian artist of Lebanese ancestry
- Riza Aziz (born 1980), Malaysian producer
- Sartaj Aziz (1929–2024), Pakistani economist and strategist
- Sassi Aziz, Algerian politician
- Serdar Aziz (born 1990), Turkish footballer
- Shaukat Aziz (born 1949), Pakistani Prime Minister
- Tariq Aziz (born Mikhail Yuhanna) (1936–2015), ethnic Assyrian former Iraqi Deputy Prime Minister
- Tariq Aziz (field hockey, born 1938) (born 1938), Pakistani field hockey player
- Tariq Aziz (TV personality) (1936–2020), Pakistani TV personality
- Tipu Aziz (1956–2024), neurosurgeon, John Radcliffe Hospital

== See also ==
- Azis (disambiguation)
- Aziza (disambiguation) (equivalent feminine name)
- Azizam
- Abdul Aziz, Arabic theophoric name
- Azziz (disambiguation)
- Azizah
- Kfar Aziz
