= Gardi =

Gardi may refer to:

== People ==
- Gardi Hutter (born 1953), Swiss clown
- Aziz Gardi (1947–2022), Iraqi Kurdish writer, translator, and academic
- Ibrahim Khan Gardi, Muslim general from India, died 1761
- Gardi, Surname founded mostly in afghanistan
- Gardi, a sub-caste of the Kalbelia community of Rajasthan
  - Sumer Singh Gardi, an assassin of Narayanrao, died 1775

== Places ==
- Gardi, India
- Gardi, Nepal
- Gardi, Georgia, United States
