= Azziz =

Azziz may refer to:

- Azziz, a commune in Algeria
- Ricardo Azziz, chief executive officer of the American Society for Reproductive Medicine (ASRM)
- Azziz Irmal, Algerian footballer

== See also ==
- Aziz
- Azize
