= Azizam =

Azizam (Persian: عزیزم, romanized: 'azizam [ʔæziːˈzæm]) originates from the Arabic language and is derived from the Arabic word root عزیز 'aziz, which means "dear", "beloved", or "precious". The suffix ـم -am is a possessive pronoun in Persian, meaning "my". "Azizam" literally translates to "my dear" or "my beloved".

Azizam may also refer to:

- "Azizam" (song), a 2025 song by Ed Sheeran
- Azizam (restaurant), a Los Angeles restaurant

== See also ==
- Aziz
