= Khaleel Aziz =

Indian artist

- Born: Hyderabad, India
- Education: JNTU
- Occupation: Freelance artist
- Known for: Relief Art
- Website: www.khaleelart.com

Khaleel is an Indian artist who lives in Hyderabad, India. He is the son of the artist Aziz.
