= Beirut derby (basketball) =

Rivalry between Al Riyadi and Sagesse

- Native name: ديربي بيروت
- Location: Beirut, Lebanon
- Teams: Al Riyadi, Sagesse
- Stadiums: Manara Arena and Ghazir Stadium

Statistics
- Total meetings: 143
- Most wins: Al Riyadi (96)

The Beirut derby (Arabic: ديربي بيروت) is a basketball rivalry between Lebanese clubs Al Riyadi and Sagesse, both based Beirut. It is considered the main rivalry in Lebanese basketball.

== History ==
Al Riyadi was founded 1943, and expanded its financial backing through support linked to Lebanese prime minister Rafic Hariri, while the basketball section of Sagesse was established in 1992 by businessman Antoine Choueiri. During the 1990s, the clubs developed a rivalry as basketball grew in popularity in Lebanon following the civil war.

Between 1997 and 2004, Sagesse won seven consecutive Lebanese championships and several Arab and Asian club titles. After ending Sagesse's title streak in 2004, Al Riyadi established itself as the country's leading club, winning multiple league championships during the late 2000s and 2010s. Meetings between the two sides became known as the Beirut derby and attracted some of the largest attendances in Lebanese basketball.

== Fan culture ==
The rivalry has often been associated in Lebanese media with Beirut's political and sectarian divisions. According to L'Orient–Le Jour, Sagesse has traditionally drawn much of its support from predominantly Christian districts such as Achrafieh, while Al Riyadi has been associated with western Beirut and the city's Sunni community.

Matches between the clubs regularly attract large crowds and extensive media coverage. Although political and sectarian narratives have frequently accompanied the rivalry, L'Orient–Le Jour reported that many supporters reject such characterisations and regard it primarily as a sporting rivalry.

== Head-to-head ==
As of 18 June 2025, the clubs have met 143 times, with Al Riyadi winning 96 matches and Sagesse 47. At Manara Arena, their most frequent venue, Al Riyadi had won 57 of 70 meetings, compared with 13 victories for Sagesse.

A press report described a meeting during the 2022–23 season as the clubs' 131st encounter since 1992.

== Notable matches ==
- During the 2013–14 Lebanese Basketball League finals, fighting involving players and spectators after a Sagesse victory in Ghazir led to the suspension of the series for several weeks.
- In the 2023–24 Lebanese Basketball League finals, Al Riyadi defeated Sagesse 92–77 to win the championship.
- The clubs have also met in regional competitions, including the FIBA West Asia Super League.

== See also ==
- List of basketball rivalries
- Basketball in Lebanon
- Nationalism and sport
- Beirut derby (football)
