= Muhammad Aziz =

Muhammad Aziz may be an alternative spelling of the names of the following persons:

- Mohamad Aziz (1940–2020), Malaysian politician
- Mohammed Aziz (1954–2018), Indian playback singer
- Mohamed Aziz (footballer), Moroccan footballer

== See also ==
- Mohammad Azizi (born 1988), Iranian footballer
- Aziz Khan (disambiguation)
