= Showtime Flag Football League =

Nigerian flag football league

The Showtime Flag Football League (formerly SFFL Showtime), established on July 7, 2023, is Nigeria's largest co-ed professional flag football league. The league follows a 7-on-7 co-ed format, requiring each team to field at least three female players on every play.

Founded by Azeez Amida in September 2023, the league is structured as a round-robin competition, with the top six teams advancing to the playoffs and ultimately competing for a place in the championship game, The Showtime Bowl. The winner of the Bowl receives a cash prize, a championship trophy, and custom player rings. The league is led by CEO Manal Nassar.

== History ==
The Showtime Flag Football League debuted with the SFFL All-Star Games on September 17, 2023, in Lagos, Nigeria. The league initially launched with 10 teams but has since restructured to 8 teams, each featuring a 30-player roster. All matches are played at the Showtime Arena, Meadow Hall, Lekki Lagos, Lekki, which serves as the league's official venue. Showtime Flag Football League was founded to create an engaging and competitive sporting environment, showcasing athletes between 18 and 55 years old.

The SFFL Showtime league underwent a significant transformation in July 2024, rebranding to Showtime Flag and officially transitioning to a fully professional structure. This development, led by League Commissioner Adebare Adejumo and founded by Azeez Amida, shifted the league from its semi-professional roots to become a professional entity aimed at creating viable career paths for flag football athletes in Nigeria. The rebranding from SFFL Showtime to Showtime Flag on July 12, 2024, marked a shift to a professional model.

The league expanded beyond Lagos for the first time, with teams like Ogun Horns and Delta Braves participating in the 2024 season.

== League format ==
Showtime Flag Football League plays under a modified version of International Federation of American Football (IFAF) rules. The competition follows a structured three-stage format:

- Regular Season: Each team competes in a round-robin format. The top six teams, based on win percentage, advance to the playoffs.
- Playoffs: The six qualifying teams compete in elimination rounds to secure a spot in The Showtime Bowl.
- Showtime Bowl: The season's championship match, where teams compete for a prize pool, including customized championship rings, a trophy, and cash rewards.

Showtime Flag Football League also features affiliate and guest teams that participate in various stages of competition.

== Showtime Arena ==
Showtime Flag Football League matches are hosted at Showtime Arena, located within, Meadow Hall School, Lekki Lagos.

== Teams ==
The league currently features eight teams, all based in Lagos:

Club	City	Stadium	Capacity
Lagos Athletics	Lagos	Showtime Arena, Meadow Hall, Lekki Lagos	
Ikan Sports	Lagos	Showtime Arena, Meadow Hall, Lekki Lagos	
Green Backs	Lagos	Showtime Arena, Meadow Hall, Lekki Lagos	
Lagos Raptors	Lagos	Showtime Arena, Meadow Hall, Lekki Lagos	
Lagos Panthers	Lagos	Showtime Arena, Meadow Hall, Lekki Lagos	
Alphas	Lagos	Showtime Arena, Meadow Hall, Lekki Lagos	
Warriors	Lagos	Showtime Arena, Meadow Hall, Lekki Lagos	
Off-season	Lagos	Showtime Arena, Meadow Hall, Lekki Lagos	

== Media coverage ==
Showtime Flag Football League has received coverage from local and international media platforms.

== Future plans ==
Showtime Flag Football League has indicated plans for potential national expansion and youth development programs to support the growth of flag football in Nigeria. Showtime Flag Football League continues to operate as a competitive co-ed flag football league, promoting the sport within Nigeria.
