= 2004 FIBA Asia Champions Cup =

Basketball tournament

15th Asia Champions Cup

Tournament details
- Host country: United Arab Emirates
- Dates: 15–22 May
- Teams: 10
- Venue(s): 1 (in 1 host city)

Final positions
- Champions: Lebanon (3rd title)

The FIBA Asia Champions Cup 2004 was the 15th staging of the FIBA Asia Champions Cup, the basketball club tournament of FIBA Asia. The tournament was held in Sharjah, United Arab Emirates between May 15 to 22, 2004.

The Sagesse team from Lebanon was the first club to win three FIBA Asia Champions Cup titles after narrowly defeating the reigning champions Al-Wahda from Syria in the Final.

== Preliminary round ==
=== Group A ===
Team	Pld	W	L	PF	PA	PD	Pts
(Syria) Al-Wahda	4	4	0	425	265	+160	8
(United Arab Emirates) Al-Sharjah	4	3	1	354	301	+53	7
(Bahrain) Al-Manama	4	2	2	363	361	+2	6
(India) Young Cagers	4	1	3	254	373	−119	5
(Philippines) Mediatrix Telecom	4	0	4	295	391	−96	4

May 15
17:00

Young Cagers (India)	57–86	(United Arab Emirates) Al-Sharjah
Scoring by quarter: 16–27, 15–18, 9–25, 17–16

Sharjah Sports Club Court, Sharjah

May 15
19:00

Al-Wahda (Syria)	113–62	(Philippines) Mediatrix Telecom
Scoring by quarter: 33–14, 16–13, 32–4, 32–31

Sharjah Sports Club Court, Sharjah

May 16
17:00

Mediatrix Telecom (Philippines)	70–80	(India) Young Cagers
Scoring by quarter: 21–25, 16–17, 18–16, 15–22

Sharjah Sports Club Court, Sharjah

May 16
19:00

Al-Manama (Bahrain)	83–101	(United Arab Emirates) Al-Sharjah
Scoring by quarter: 25–29, 20–18, 23–26, 15–28

Sharjah Sports Club Court, Sharjah

May 17
17:00

Al-Wahda (Syria)	122–49	(India) Young Cagers
Scoring by quarter: 36–18, 26–3, 35–10, 25–18

Sharjah Sports Club Court, Sharjah

May 17
19:00

Mediatrix Telecom (Philippines)	81–98	(Bahrain) Al-Manama
Scoring by quarter: 22–27, 25–30, 15–30, 19–11

Sharjah Sports Club Court, Sharjah

May 18
17:00

Al-Sharjah (United Arab Emirates)	100–82	(Philippines) Mediatrix Telecom
Scoring by quarter: 26–11, 18–33, 31–12, 25–26

Sharjah Sports Club Court, Sharjah

May 18
19:00

Al-Manama (Bahrain)	87–111	(Syria) Al-Wahda
Scoring by quarter: 23–26, 21–25, 25–36, 18–24

Sharjah Sports Club Court, Sharjah

May 19
17:00

Young Cagers (India)	68–95	(Bahrain) Al-Manama
Scoring by quarter: 16–25, 16–23, 28–24, 8–23

Sharjah Sports Club Court, Sharjah

May 19
21:00

Al-Sharjah (United Arab Emirates)	67–79	(Syria) Al-Wahda
Scoring by quarter: 14–20, 20–23, 13–13, 20–23

Sharjah Sports Club Court, Sharjah

=== Group B ===
Team	Pld	W	L	PF	PA	PD	Pts	Tiebreaker
(Qatar) Al-Rayyan	4	3	1	398	252	+46	7	1–0
(South Korea) Sangmu Phoenix	4	3	1	358	317	+41	7	0–1
(Lebanon) Sagesse	4	2	2	360	345	+14	6	
(Malaysia) Petronas	4	1	3	312	383	−71	5	1–0
Al-Kuwait	4	1	3	337	367	−30	5	0–1

May 15
15:00

Al-Kuwait	87–102	(South Korea) Sangmu
Scoring by quarter: 21–23, 26–26, 17–23, 23–30

Sharjah Sports Club Court, Sharjah

May 15
21:00

Al-Rayyan (Qatar)	98–99	(Lebanon) Sagesse
Scoring by quarter: 23–23, 21–24, 23–27, 31–25

Sharjah Sports Club Court, Sharjah

May 16
15:00

Petronas (Malaysia)	84–80	Al-Kuwait
Scoring by quarter: 24–23, 22–16, 10–21, 28–20

Sharjah Sports Club Court, Sharjah

May 16
21:00

Sangmu (South Korea)	85–84	(Lebanon) Sagesse
Scoring by quarter: 20–21, 9–25, 31–17, 25–21

Sharjah Sports Club Court, Sharjah

May 17
15:00

Al-Rayyan (Qatar)	96–68	(South Korea) Sangmu
Scoring by quarter: 36–22, 14–23, 28–13, 18–10

Sharjah Sports Club Court, Sharjah

May 17
21:00

Sagesse (Lebanon)	92–71	(Malaysia) Petronas
Scoring by quarter: 26–13, 27–26, 28–11, 11–21

Sharjah Sports Club Court, Sharjah

May 18
15:00

Petronas (Malaysia)	107–108 (2OT)	(Qatar) Al-Rayyan
Scoring by quarter: 22–26, 19–21, 21–13, 23–25, Overtime: 11–11, 11–12

Sharjah Sports Club Court, Sharjah

May 18
21:00

Al-Kuwait	92–85	(Lebanon) Sagesse
Scoring by quarter: 24–25, 14–17, 24–19, 30–24

Sharjah Sports Club Court, Sharjah

May 19
15:00

Petronas (Malaysia)	50–103	(South Korea) Sangmu
Scoring by quarter: 16–25, 14–16, 7–28, 13–34

Sharjah Sports Club Court, Sharjah

May 19
19:00

Al-Rayyan (Qatar)	96–78	Al-Kuwait
Scoring by quarter: 26–23, 22–22, 32–14, 16–19

Sharjah Sports Club Court, Sharjah

== Knockout round ==
=== Championship ===
Quarter-finals
May 20 – Sharjah
(Lebanon) Sagesse	82
(United Arab Emirates) Al-Sharjah	78
May 20 – Sharjah
(India) Young Cagers	64
(Qatar) Al-Rayyan	102
May 20 – Sharjah
(Bahrain) Al-Manama	75
(South Korea) Sangmu	86
May 20 – Sharjah
(Malaysia) Petronas	68
(Syria) Al-Wahda	100

Semi-finals
May 21 – Sharjah
(Lebanon) Sagesse	87
(Qatar) Al-Rayyan	69
May 21 – Sharjah
(South Korea) Sangmu	89
(Syria) Al-Wahda	99

Final
May 22 – Sharjah
(Lebanon) Sagesse	72
(Syria) Al-Wahda	70
Third place
May 22 – Sharjah
(Qatar) Al-Rayyan	82
(South Korea) Sangmu	80

=== 5th–8th places ===
Semi-finals
May 21 – Sharjah
(United Arab Emirates) Al-Sharjah	89
(India) Young Cagers	62
May 21 – Sharjah
(Bahrain) Al-Manama	94
(Malaysia) Petronas	88

Fifth place
May 22 – Sharjah
(United Arab Emirates) Al-Sharjah	83
(Bahrain) Al-Manama	76
Seventh place
May 22 – Sharjah
(India) Young Cagers	94
(Malaysia) Petronas	95

=== Quarterfinals ===
May 20
15:00

Young Cagers (India)	64–102	(Qatar) Al-Rayyan
Scoring by quarter: 18–20, 17–24, 14–24, 15–34

Sharjah Sports Club Court, Sharjah

May 20
17:00

Petronas (Malaysia)	68–100	(Syria) Al-Wahda
Scoring by quarter: 16–18, 18–19, 12–30, 22–33

Sharjah Sports Club Court, Sharjah

May 20
19:00

Al-Manama (Bahrain)	75–86	(South Korea) Sangmu
Scoring by quarter: 17–25, 21–18, 16–24, 21–19

Sharjah Sports Club Court, Sharjah

May 20
21:00

Sagesse (Lebanon)	82–78	(United Arab Emirates) Al-Sharjah
Scoring by quarter: 24–22, 20–16, 16–24, 22–16

Sharjah Sports Club Court, Sharjah

=== Semifinals ===
May 21
15:00

5th–8th

Al-Manama (Bahrain)	94–88	(Malaysia) Petronas

Sharjah Sports Club Court, Sharjah

May 21
17:00

5th–8th

Al-Sharjah (United Arab Emirates)	89–62	(India) Young Cagers

Sharjah Sports Club Court, Sharjah

May 21
19:00

Semis

Sangmu (South Korea)	89–99	(Syria) Al-Wahda
Scoring by quarter: 17–16, 27–24, 29–27, 16–32

Sharjah Sports Club Court, Sharjah

May 21
21:00

Semis

Sagesse (Lebanon)	87–69	(Qatar) Al-Rayyan
Scoring by quarter: 22–12, 21–15, 24–22, 20–20

Sharjah Sports Club Court, Sharjah

=== Finals ===
May 20
13:00

9th–10th

Mediatrix Telecom (Philippines)	100–125	Al-Kuwait

Sharjah Sports Club Court, Sharjah

May 22
15:00

7th–8th

Young Cagers (India)	94–95	(Malaysia) Petronas

Sharjah Sports Club Court, Sharjah

May 22
17:00

5th–6th

Al-Sharjah (United Arab Emirates)	83–76	(Bahrain) Al-Manama
Scoring by quarter: 22–12, 19–25, 27–16, 15–23

Sharjah Sports Club Court, Sharjah

May 22
19:00

Bronze

Al-Rayyan (Qatar)	82–80	(South Korea) Sangmu
Scoring by quarter: 19–20, 23–18, 17–20, 23–22

Sharjah Sports Club Court, Sharjah

May 22
21:00

Gold

Sagesse (Lebanon)	72–70	(Syria) Al-Wahda
Scoring by quarter: 21–16, 16–19, 14–18, 21–17
Pts: Beshara 26		Pts: Pitts 26

Sharjah Sports Club Court, Sharjah

== Final standings ==
Rank	Team	Record
Gold medal	(Lebanon) Sagesse	5–2
Silver medal	(Syria) Al-Wahda	6–1
Bronze medal	(Qatar) Al-Rayyan	5–2
4th	(South Korea) Sangmu Phoenix	4–3
5th	(United Arab Emirates) Al-Sharjah	5–2
6th	(Bahrain) Al-Manama	3–4
7th	(Malaysia) Petronas	2–5
8th	(India) Young Cagers	1–6
9th	Al-Kuwait	2–3
10th	(Philippines) Mediatrix Telecom	0–5
