= Aziz Ahmed =

Aziz Ahmed may refer to:

== People ==
- Aziz Ahmed (civil servant) (1906–1982), Pakistani civil servant
- Aziz Ahmed (general) (born 1961), Bangladeshi general
- Aziz Ahmed Chaudhry (born 1932), Pakistani sports shooter
- Aziz Ahmed Jatoi (1964–2024), Pakistani politician
- Aziz Abdullah Ahmed (1927–2008), Iraqi Kurdish judge

== See also ==
- Aziz Ahmad (disambiguation)
