= Mediatrix Telecom basketball team =

The Mediatrix Telecom basketball team represented the Philippines in the 15th FIBA Asia Champions Cup held from May 15 to May 22, 2004, in Sharjah, United Arab Emirates.

== Local Competition ==
The team participated in the 2004 National Basketball Conference Invitatonal Cup held from February 23 to 29, 2004 wherein they emerged champions.

== Competition in the FIBA-Asia Champions Cup ==
Coached by Moses Nelson Kallos and assisted by long-time Philippine Basketball Association referee Igmidio Cahanding Mediatrix Telecom finished 10th among 10 competing teams.. It was the worst finish for a Philippine club team in the Champions Cup.

== Roster ==
NAME	HEIGHT	POSITION
Mendiola, Junel	184 cm (6 ft 0 in)	G
Ricafuente, Ricky	172 cm (5 ft 8 in)	G
Mopera, Stephen	183 cm (6 ft 0 in)	F
Montemayor, Oscar	191 cm (6 ft 3 in)	C/F
Tarronas, Jonathan	191 cm (6 ft 3 in)	F
Vilar, Jose Leonito	193 cm (6 ft 4 in)	F
Intalan, Romualdo	173 cm (5 ft 8 in)	G
de Guia, Bernard	191 cm (6 ft 3 in)	F
Federizio, Almario	198 cm (6 ft 6 in)	C
