= Aziz Diya =

Saudi writer

- Born: Abdul Aziz Zia al-Din Zahid Murad; January 22, 1914; Medina
- Died: 1997 (aged 82–83)
- Occupations: Military, civil servant, broadcaster, press editor, article writer, translator, critic, political commentator, autobiographer
- Children: Diya Aziz

Abdul Aziz Zia al-Din Zahid Murad, also known as Aziz Diya (1914–1997), was a prominent Saudi writer, critic, translator, journalist and broadcaster. He was a member of the Culture and Arts Association, a founding member of the Jeddah Literary Club, co-founder of the Okaz newspaper, and worked with Saudi Radio as a political commentator. He joined the military in 1928, then transferred to general security. He assumed several governmental positions, the most prominent of which was his appointment as Director of Airlines during his tenure in the Ministry of Defence, Aviation and the General Inspectorate. He assumed as well the position of Deputy Director of Public Security for Investigation Affairs. Passports and Nationality at the Ministry of Interior.

== Career ==
=== Early life and education ===
He was born in Al-Qafl Alley in Mahalla Al-Sa’a in Al-Madinah Al-Munawwarah on 12 Rabi’ Al-Awwal 1332 AH (corresponding to January 22, 1914), the year that witnessed the outbreak of the First World War. At the age of three, he lost his father who traveled to Russia to raise funds for the establishment of the Islamic University, and never returned. It is assumed that he was killed during that trip.

His family suffered as a result of the 1916 siege of the Sharif of Mecca Hussein bin Ali's army and the Arab tribes of the city. They were later forced to migrate to the Levant in the historical journey known as "Safar Berlik" via the Hijaz Rainlway. Diya recorded his memories of that trip and the period of displacement to the Levant in his masterpiece "My Life with Hunger, Love and War." His family's journey came to a tragic end, as he lost his maternal aunt, his maternal grandfather, and his younger brother during their residence in Levant. He returned with his mother only to Medina after the end of the war and the departure of the Turkish army.

He studied in the Hashemite high school, and then the health school in Makkah Al-Mukarramah in 1927, but he dropped out after an incident with one of its teachers. He studied for a period at the Khedive Ismail School in Cairo. He moved between the American University of Beirut and the Institute of Criminal Investigation at the Faculty of Law at the Egyptian University, but the circumstances of the outbreak of the Second World War forced him to return to the KSA. His son, Diaa Tashkeel, is a famous example, who is the owner of the Great Qur’an monument at the entrance to Makkah Al-Mukarramah, and his daughter Dalal is a great announcer on Jeddah Radio.

==== Work in the government ====
Zia filled several government and security positions. He started as a paper recorder at the Public Health Directorate in Makkah, then in the office of the Director of Public Security. Then he became a control clerk with the city police, before returning to Makkah to receive a short military course, after which he was appointed head of the third region in Makkah, and continued his work in the police for several years before deciding to join the Mission Preparation School during its opening, and then set out on his incomplete educational journey to Egypt and Lebanon.

He returned to work in the police for a while and then left again for Cairo to join the Criminal Investigation Institute of the Faculty of Law, but his journey was not completed again due to his financial circumstances. He returned to the Kingdom and was appointed Head of the Police Execution Department, then Assistant to the Director General of the Ministry of Defense, and then Director of Saudi Airlines during the reign of the first Minister of Defense, Prince Mansour bin Abdulaziz Al Saud.

Due to the political disputes, he was forced to leave the Kingdom at the end of the 1940s. He went to Egypt and then India, where he worked at Arab Radio in Bombay, accompanied by his wife, Asmaa Zaazou, who also worked there as the first Saudi broadcaster from outside the Kingdom. He returned to the Kingdom after two years of residence in India, and was appointed Director of the Foreigners Control Office. Then he was appointed undersecretary to the Director of Public Security for Investigation Affairs, Passports and Nationality.

===== Work in press =====
Zia worked in the press from an early age. He was one of the first to write a political article in Al-Bilad newspaper, one of the oldest Saudi newspapers, at an early age. He co-founded the newspaper Okaz and served as its editor-in-chief for ten months. He took over as editor-in-chief of Al-Madina newspaper in 1964, before he was removed after only 40 days due to his publication of documents revealing some financial irregularities in the Ministry of Petroleum.

He specialized in the political article, where he wrote for Saudi Radio as a political commentator for about 15 years and had a series of articles in response to the attacks that the Egyptian media launched on the Kingdom during the period before the 1967 setback. He participated as a daily and weekly writer and during different periods in his life in different newspapers such as: Okaz, Medina, Riyadh, Al-Bilad, Al-Nadwa, Al-Yamamah, National Guard and Al-Jeel magazines. He has written in addition to the political field in the literary and social fields. Many of these articles were republished in the complete series of works by Professor Aziz Zia, which was guaranteed to be printed and issued by Professor Abdel-Maqsoud Khoja through the Al-Thaniah Cultural Foundation and Forum.

====== Literary career ======
In his youth, Zia emerged as a storyteller, critic, and writer, and began publishing work in newspapers including journals on literature and criticism in Umm al-Qura and Sawt al-Hijaz. AH (1936 AD), Aziz Zia was among those who included this book in a part of their literary works, and those effects grew on his dialect of Arabic literature in the diaspora, and his prose was characterized by the characteristics of romantic literature, and he established, like his peers from the writers of that period, writes scattered poetry, tracing the impact of Amin al-Rihani, and in "The Revelation of the Desert", also, [his] attempt did not succeed in composing poetry on the ancient Arab styles, and it is most likely that he abandoned this art and turned, immediately, to rich writing of all kinds, in creation, criticism, and Arabization."His literary biography is also rich in more than one field, as a precursor, writer and translator of more than 30 works in the novel and theatre. He was a writer and an existentialist, and was influenced by the migration and renewal currents. He contributed to presenting various programs and drama series on Radio Jeddah. He was one of the first to translate English literary works into Arabic in the Kingdom, and he benefited from his studies at the American University in Beirut, translating international fiction and theatrical works by elite writers such as Tagore, Oscar Wilde, Somerset Maugham, Tolstoy, George Orwell and Bernard shaw. Some of these works were printed and published by the Tihama Foundation, while others were published on the pages of newspapers and magazines.He was a member of the Saudi Supreme Council for Culture, Arts and Literature when it was established in the mid-seventies, and he was among those who proposed the idea of establishing literary clubs. He is a founding member of the Jeddah Literary Club, as he participated with Mr. Muhammad Hassan Awad in its founding in 1975. He participated in the elections for the club's first board of directors, where he was elected to the position of vice president of the club. He also participated in giving many cultural, media and social lectures in the club and outside the club.

== Works ==
=== Translations ===
- (The era of boyhood in the desert) (Ahs al saba fe al badya) translation 1980 AD.
- Stories from (Somerset Maugham) Arabization 1981.
- (The Unique Star) (Al nagam al fared) – translated stories.
- (Bridges to the Summit) (josor ela al kema)- translations 1981.
- (Strawberry tart) (tortat al farawla) Arab children's stories 1983 AD.
- (Stories from Tagore) (kesas mn taghor) translation 1983AD.
- (The World in 1984 by George Orwell) – a translated novel in 1984.

=== Literature ===
- (Hamza Shehata is a summit that was known and not discovered) 1977 AD.
- (Happiness does not know the hour) 1983 AD.
- (Mama Zubaydah) Stories 1984 AD.
- (My life with hunger, love and war) biography 1995 AD.
- (Grapes of Hate) is a novel published in parts in the magazine Iqra.
- (Views of Art and Beauty) Prose Collection
- (The heart was saying) Prose group
