= Aziz Abdullah Ahmed =

Iraqi judge

Aziz Abdullah Ahmed Mirza (عزيز عبدالله احمد) (1927 – 5 August 2008) was an Iraqi Kurdish judge. He was born in Sulaymaniyah, Kurdistan Region, Iraq, in 1927. He graduated from the Faculty of Law at Baghdad University in 1950. He was a member of the High Court of Cassation from 1996 until 2004 in Erbil, the capital of Kurdistan. He was the father of Professor Parosh Abdulla of Uppsala University in Sweden.

== Death ==
He died of Alzheimer's disease on 5 August 2008.
