= Aziz Osman Bakir =

General Secretary of the Arab Scout Bureau

General Secretary of the Arab Scout Bureau

Aziz Osman Bakir (Arabic: عزيز عثمان بكر) served as the General Secretary of the Arab Scout Bureau.

In 1971, he was awarded the 58th Bronze Wolf, the only distinction of the World Organization of the Scout Movement, awarded by the World Scout Committee for exceptional services to world Scouting.
