= Aziz Efendi =

Aziz Efendi may refer to:

== People ==
- Giritli Ali Aziz Efendi (1749–1798), Ottoman ambassador and author of Muhayyelat
- Hattat Aziz Efendi (1871–1934), Turkish calligrapher
