= Dina Aziz =

British–Bangladeshi influencer and writer

- Born: 1998 or 1999 (age 27–28); London, England
- Education: Goldsmiths, University of London
- Occupations: Influencer; author; data analyst
- Writing career
- Notable works: Ramadan Planner: A Guide to Reflection and Growth During the Holy Month (2024)

Dina Aziz is a British–Bangladeshi modest fashion and lifestyle influencer and writer. She is the author of Ramadan Planner: A Guide to Reflection and Growth During the Holy Month.

== Biography ==
Based in London, England, Aziz is a modest fashion and lifestyle influencer and is primarily active on Instagram, where she has over 50,000 followers. Speaking to I-D in 2020, Aziz said that the traditional clothes and corresponding makeup looks that she creates on her blog act as a way for her to connect with her Bangladeshi roots.

Aziz is best known for creating a digital Ramadan planner, which started as a way to support a university friend who had reverted to Islam. A link to the planner went viral on social media, with over a million downloads in 24 hours. It includes tools to use during Ramadan, such as checklists, space for fasting reflections and noting down good deeds, tips for planning Eid-ul-Fitr celebrations and daily Qur’anic prayers. It has since been published as Ramadan Planner: A Guide to Reflection and Growth During the Holy Month, a hardback book, in 2024 by Penguin Random House.

Aziz holds a degree in Computer science from Goldsmiths, University of London and works as a data analyst in addition to being an influencer.
