= Aziz İstegün =

Turkish journalist

- Born: Şanlıurfa, Turkey
- Occupation: Journalist
- Known for: Journalist for Today's Zaman, imprisoned journalist in Turkey.

Aziz İstegün is a Turkish journalist who worked for Today's Zaman, and was imprisoned on charges of belonging to an alleged terrorist organisation run by exiled Turkish cleric Fethullah Gülen.

İstegün's family are from Şanlıurfa.

İstegün was the Diyarbakır representative for Zaman newspaper. He was arrested on August 1, 2016 as part of investigations into the failed July 2016 coup attempt. İstegün's arrest came in the context of the State of Emergency laws which were brought in as a result of the coup attempt.

In August 2018, İstegün was sentenced along with a number of other journalists to 7 years, 6 months in jail. Turkish news sources such as Bianet have criticised the imprisonment of journalists like İstegün for the crime of 'journalism'.
