= Aziz Abdul Naji =

Algerian citizen (born 1975)

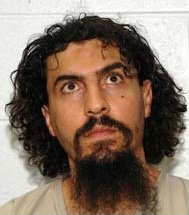
- Naji's photo taken by JTF-GTMO in Guantanamo (date unknown)
- Born: May 4, 1975 (age 51); Batna, Algeria
- Citizenship: Algeria
- Detained at: Guantanamo
- ISN: 744
- Charge: No charge
- Status: Transferred to Algeria against his will

Abdul Aziz Naji (born May 4, 1975 in Batna) is an Algerian citizen who was held without charges in the United States Guantanamo Bay detention camp in Cuba from August 2002 until he was repatriated against his will in July 2010. No charges have ever been brought against him by the US government.

== Background ==
American intelligence analysts report that he was born on May 4, 1975, in Batna, Algeria. Abdul Aziz Naji asserts he was in Pakistan as an aid worker, performing zakat, when he lost a leg to a land mine near embattled Kashmir prior to the 9/11 attack on the US. He spent a year in medical rehabilitation in Pakistan.

== Imprisonment and release ==
Naji's capture came shortly after his release from the hospital during a trip to Peshawar, where he was to meet a marriage broker. He was transported to Guantanamo and arrived on August 5, 2002 without charges being filed against him. He had a habeas corpus appeal initiated on his behalf in 2005. On July 15, 2008, Kristine A. Huskey filed a request for 30 days notice of transfer on behalf of captives whose names are not on any of the official lists. Naji was represented by Ellen Lubell and Doris Tennant of Newton, Massachusetts, who appealed to Newton's city council to follow the example of neighboring Amherst and offer sanctuary to their client.

On May 20, 2009, he was cleared for transfer by the Guantanamo Review Task Force established by President Obama's Executive Order on January 22, 2009. The Obama administration transferred Abdul Aziz Naji to Algeria in July 2010. Naji argued that he would face a high risk of being tortured if he was forced to return to Algeria, but he lost his case before the Supreme Court. Human Rights Watch has heavily criticized the Obama administration for their decision. On July 25, 2010, Naji was indicted by the government of Algeria and placed under judicial supervision though it is not known what he had been charged with or what the supervision entailed.

In an email, dated July 23, 2010, Bill Quigley, Legal Director of Center for Constitutional Rights, stated that Naji had gone missing after the US sent him back to Algeria against his will and that Naji feared persecution from both the Algerian government and militant anti-government forces. Naji had applied for political asylum in Switzerland but was ultimately denied. His lawyer appealed to Switzerland's Federal Administrative Court, which ruled, on December 10, 2009, that the justifications for turning down the asylum request were vague and inadequate. They ruled that the decision on his asylum request would have to be re-done. In June 2013, the Federal Migration Office responded to queries as to why it had not reviewed Abdul Aziz Naji's request, saying that the "duration of asylum proceedings is dependent on various factors."

Naji was convicted in Algeria on January 16, 2012, of “belonging to a terrorist group abroad”. According to the human rights group Reprieve, the prosecution didn't introduce new evidence against him and only used the uncorroborated allegations from Guantanamo. In 2016, Al Jazeera reported that he had served three years in prison on terror charges.
