= Meadow Hall School =

Location
- Lekki; Nigeria
- 6.43159°N 3.48788°E

Information
- Established: July 2002
- Gender: co-educational
- Website: meadowhalleducation.org

Meadow Hall is a private school in Lekki, Lagos, Nigeria.

Founded in July 2002 by Kehinde Nwani, the school uses a combination of the English National Curriculum and the Nigerian Curriculum.

The school began Meadow Hall Infant and Junior School in 2002 then expanded into Infant and Junior schools on two sites (Lekki and Ikoyi) and a College in Lekki, with a total population of about 1,400 students.

The sports facilities include football, basketball, swimming, tennis and volleyball.
