= Aziz-ur Rehman =

Pakistani field hockey player

Personal information
- Nationality: Pakistani
- Born: 1923 Delhi, British India
- Died: September 2014 (aged 90–91)

Sport
- Sport: Field hockey

Aziz-ur Rehman (1923 – September 2014) was a Pakistani field hockey player. He competed in the men's tournament at the 1948 Summer Olympics in London.

He recalled that London of the day faced the after-effects of World War II, including much poverty and soaring inflation.

He had opted for Pakistan in 1947 and settled down in Karachi. He worked and played for Pakistan Public Works Department and represented Sindh-Karachi from 1948 to 1952, during the National Championships.
