= Shimna Azeez =

Indian medical doctor

- Born: Kerala, India
- Occupations: Doctor, writer

Shimna Azeez is an Indian General Practitioner and public health worker. She has published two popular books and is a social media influencer who is widely read online, and in print media. Dr. Shimna is also an accomplished public speaker, and has presented on various health-related topics on national and international platforms, including Misinformation in Medicine Forum, Singapore; a ‘Google News Initiative’ to build collaboration between doctors, technologists and media professionals to combat the misinformation epidemic in health in Asia; at Google HQ, Singapore in December 2019.

A Pro-vaccination exponent, she has been the face of the Kerala Government's pro-vaccination campaigns, and multiple COVID-19 awareness drives. Dr. Shimna has been involved in various community health initiatives including the Kerala Government's Measles Rubella Vaccine Campaign in 2017 and medical camps during the mega Kerala floods of 2018 and 2019. She also appears regularly on live panel discussions on various news channels to present the Kerala Government's stance on community health topics.

== Education ==
Shimna Azeez graduated with a BA. in Communicative English from CMS College, Kottayam. She completed her MBBS from KMCT Medical College, Mukkom, Kozhikode. She holds an MPH from Sree Chitra Tirunal Institute for Medical Sciences & Technology, Thiruvananthapuram

== Notable achievements ==
Her regular column in the popular Malayalam Daily ‘Mathrubhumi’ on health and related subjects was widely read and quoted by the general public. Co-founder, administrator and content contributor at ‘Info Clinic’ a popular online platform which aims to improve health awareness and debunk health-myths in the society. Her blogs related to public health, vaccination etc. have created a huge impact, and she has also written various articles related to community health in popular Malayalam Newspapers and magazines.

== Books published ==
- 'പിറന്നവർക്കും പറന്നവർക്കുമിടയിൽ' 'Pirannavarkum Parannavarkumidayil' (translation: From Birth to Death: Memories and articles of a medical doctor) published by DC books in 2017. The book used scientific thought to debunk various health-related superstitions and beliefs prevalent in Kerala.
- 'തൊട്ടിലിലെ വാവയെ തൊട്ടീന്ന് കിട്ടിയതാ?' 'Thottilile Vaavaye Thotteennu Kittiyathaa?' (approximate translation: Did the Stork Bring the Baby?) Is the first Malayalam-language book on reproductive health for adolescents, and was published by DC books in January 2022.

== Awards ==
- Dr. V. Santosh Memorial Award 2018 – for the work of the Measles Rubella Vaccine Campaign
- One of the Most Influential Women of South India – News Minute Award 2017.
- One of the Most Influential Women – Eastern Bhoomika Award 2019.
- Powerful Women Shaping India- The New Indian Express 2024.

== Personal life ==
She worked as a lecturer in the Department of Community Medicine, Government Medical College Manjeri (Malappuram). Currently she is working as the Surveillance Medical Officer under the World Health Organization India, for Samastipur district of Bihar state.
