= Sagesse SC (basketball) =

Lebanese sports club

Sagesse Club - Basketball team نادي الحكمة - فريق كرة السلة
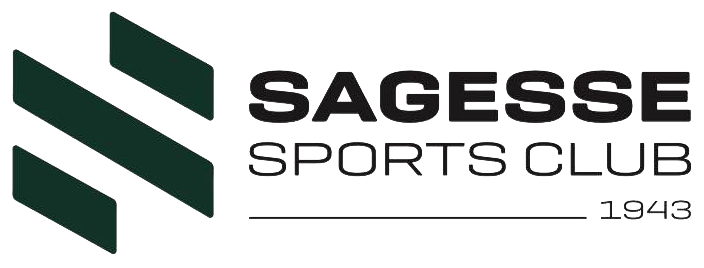
- Nickname: The Green Castle (Arabic: القلعة الخضراء)
- Leagues: Lebanese Basketball League (FLB League): Div.1; West Asia Super League (WASL)
- Founded: 1943
- History: Sagesse SC (1943–present) Sagesse BC (1992–present)
- Arena: Antoine Choueiry Stadium, Ghazir
- Capacity: 5,000
- Location: Achrafieh, Beirut
- Team colors: Green, White
- President: Ragheb Haddad
- Head coach: Joe Ghattas
- Affiliation: Collège de la Sagesse of the Maronite Catholic Archeparchy of Beirut
- Championships: 8 Lebanese Basketball League; 3 WABA Champions Cup; 3 Basketball Champions League Asia; 3 Arab Club Championship; 7 Lebanese Cup Championship; 1 Lebanese Challenge Cup
- Website: www.sagesseclub.com
Home	Away	Third

Sagesse Sports Club (French: Club Sportif de la Sagesse), known as Hekmeh in Arabic, is a Lebanese sports club founded in 1943 and is based in Beirut. The basketball team was established in 1992, as part of the Club Sagesse which was known mainly for its football (soccer) team, quickly becoming the leading branch of the club due to its fast rise and unprecedented success on national and international levels.

== History ==
Al-Hikma in classical Arabic, El-Hekmeh in Lebanese dialect stands for "wisdom", thus also the French alternative name of the club, Sagesse (meaning wisdom in French).

The Hekmeh club was founded in Beirut in 1943 under the patronage of late father Boulos Kik, supported by Mgr. Jean Maroun, with affiliation to the Collège de la Sagesse of the Maronite Catholic Church, a leading educational institution in Lebanon and the East.

The basketball program was founded in 1992, when the club was headed and financed by media tycoon also widely dubbed as the Godfather of Lebanese basketball, president Antoine Choueiri, he was elected president following the passing of president Henri El Asmar.

Choueiri wanted a team that will achieve success and popularity in a bid to change Lebanese sports history and unite Lebanese behind a successful team that will represent Lebanon and Lebanese basketball on a national and international level.

In 1992, Hekmeh/Sagesse added top Lebanese national basketball team players to its roster, such as Elie Mechantaf and Fadi El Khatib, who formed one of the greatest duos in Asian basketball history, African stars Assane N'diaye and Mohammed Acha, and other notable foreigners, being top ex-NBA players, FIBA Continental and World Cup participants, a calibre that was rarely seen in Lebanon and the region; They were managed by then national basketball team coach Ghassan Sarkis.

Sagesse won 8 Lebanese Basketball League Championships, 7 Lebanese Basketball Cups, 3 Arab Club Basketball Championships, and 3 FIBA Asia Champions Cup titles, building the foundation of success for Lebanese basketball in particular, and Lebanese sports in general.

Hekmeh became the first Lebanese club to win the Arab Club Basketball Championship and the first Lebanese and first Arab club to win the FIBA Asia Champions Cup. In addition Sagesse were the first Asian club to win the Basketball Champions League Asia a record three times.

Sagesse are the only Arab and only Asian club to ever participate in the basketball club world championship, the McDonald's Championship organized by FIBA and the NBA, it was at the 1999 edition when Sagesse went as the Asian champions. The 1999 McDonald's Championship was the first and only time FIBA Asia was represented in the tournament.

This participation and the way Sagesse represented Asia at the Mcdonald's Championship in Milano was praised by then Commissioner of the NBA David Stern and by former Secretary General of the FIBA Borislav Stanković among other officials.

In 2012, Sagesse won a friendly game against Turkish & Euro Cup winners Galatasaray S.K. during a training camp that the club was holding in Turkey, where Sagesse played a series of games against Turkish first division teams, this was the most significant win for a Lebanese team against a European team in recent times.

Hekmeh are often present in international tournaments and camps, playing against a selection of the best clubs and national teams from different countries.

In the post Choueiri era, from 2005 onwards, which was the last year the team won an official championship, until 2026, the club struggled to find consistency at the administrative level despite the involvement of many businessmen and political figures, these involvements were seen as well as a possible reason for the club's struggles rather than being helpful gestures; and despite having the finances to build a good team the club was still struggling with debt; compared to the Choueiri era the club has achieved mediocre success with inconsistent overall form through the seasons in spite of reaching finals in different competitions.

In the 2019 election of the club's general assembly "Choueiry Group" top official Elie Yahchouchi was elected club president; he was Antoine Choueiri's vice president during the late tycoon's tenure at the club. Also Deputy Prime Minister of Lebanon H.E. Ghassan Hasbani was elected head of the board of trustees. Many reforms, overhauls and investments have been made since in addition to future plans that were announced in the club's team presentation ceremony ahead of the 2019/20 season.

In October 2023, a new administration has been elected led by the club's honorary president M.P. Jihad Pakradouni with Lawyer and Beirut City council member Ragheb Haddad as club president.

In September 2024, Sagesse Sports Club unveiled a new logo to mark a new era in the club's history. The announcement was made through a video shared on the team's Facebook and Instagram accounts.

In 2025, the club won the inaugural Lebanese Challenge Cup, and at the start of the 2026 season, Sagesse won the Arab Club Basketball Championship, their first major championship in over 20 years.

== Rivalries ==
=== Beirut Derby ===
There is often a fierce rivalry between Club Sagesse and Riyadi is known as Beirut Derby. From the start of the national league the clubs were seen as successful representatives of two different sides in Lebanon and the two most successful and popular teams in the country.

== Honours ==
Lebanese Basketball league

- Champions (8): 1993–94, 1997–98, 1998–1999, 1999–2000, 2000–2001, 2001–02, 2002–03, 2003–04

Lebanese Basketball Cup

- Champions (7): 1993, 1998, 1999, 2000, 2001, 2002, 2003

Lebanese Basketball Challenge Cup

- Champions (1): 2025

FIBA Asia Champions Cup

- Champions (3): 1999, 2000, 2004. (Record)

WABA Champions Cup

- Champions (3): 2002, 2004, 2005
- Finalists : 2006 (Shared second place with Saba Battery with no champion crowned that year)

Arab Club Basketball Championship

- Champions (3) : 1998, 1999, 2026

International tournaments

- 1999 McDonald's Championship (Participant)
- 2001 Damascus International Championship (champions)
- 2002 Dubai International Tournament (champions)
- 2010: Damascus International Tournament (champions)
- 2012: Dubai International Tournament (champions)
- 2014: Qadisiya International Tournament (champions)
- 2015: Abu Dhabi International Tournament (champions)
- 2016: Dubai International Tournament (champions)
- 2022 : Doha International Basketball Championship (champions)

Special Awards

- 1999: Best professional basketball team in Asia.

(Specially awarded by FIBA Asia known as the Asian Basketball Confederation back then for the first time in 1999 with Sagesse Club as the inaugural winner.)

== Medals and decorations ==
(Lebanon) National Order of the Cedar

Knight in 1999

Officer in 2000

Awarded to the club for its unprecedented success in the Lebanese, Arab and Asian basketball championships that highly contributed into the development and rise of the Lebanese basketball and sports in Lebanon on many levels.

== Current roster ==
Note: Flags indicate national team eligibility at FIBA-sanctioned events. Players may hold other non-FIBA nationalities not displayed.

Sagesse roster
Players
Coaches

Pos.	No.	Nat.	Name	Ht.	Age
SG	0	(Lebanon)	Abdelmassih, Aziz	1.92 m (6 ft 4 in)	30 – 22 July 1996
F	1	(United States)	Jones, Jamal	2.03 m (6 ft 8 in)	33 – 17 February 1993
C	2	(United States)	Thomas, Elijah	2.06 m (6 ft 9 in)	30 – 10 October 1996
G	3	(Lebanon)	Khoueiry, Mark	1.91 m (6 ft 3 in)	25 – 21 August 2001
PG	16	(Lebanon)	Salha, Luay	1.82 m (6 ft 0 in)	28 – 17 February 1998
G	8	(Lebanon)	Derjani, Thierry	1.87 m (6 ft 2 in)	17 – 13 May 2009
G	13	(Lebanon)	Hajj Moussa, Roudy	1.93 m (6 ft 4 in)	23 – 30 April 2003
PF	14	(Lebanon)	Ezzedine, Karim	2.06 m (6 ft 9 in)	29 – 8 August 1997
F/C	21	(Lebanon)	Hadidian, Gerard	2.02 m (6 ft 8 in)	31 – 24 April 1995
SF	23	(Lebanon)	Khayat, Youssef (C)	2.05 m (6 ft 9 in)	23 – 11 March 2003
PG	25	(Lebanon)	Mezher, Ali	1.82 m (6 ft 0 in)	32 – 22 March 1994
C	28	(Lebanon)	Abi Kheres, Joe	2.04 m (6 ft 8 in)	34 – 3 October 1992
PG	42	(United States)	Washington, Deshawndre	2.01 m (6 ft 7 in)	25 – 23 February 2001

Head coach

- (Lebanon) Joe Ghattas

Assistant coach(es)

- (Cyprus) Michael Matsentides
- (Lebanon) Omar Bakri

Legend

- (C) Team captain
- Injured

- Roster
Updated: October 1, 2026

Pos.	Starting 5	Bench 1	Bench 2
C	Elijah Thomas	Gerard Hadidian	Joe Abi Kheres
PF	Jamal Jones	Karim Ezzedine
SF	Youssef Khayat	Roudy Hajj Moussa
SG	Deshawndre Washington	Aziz Abdelmassih	Mark Khoueiry
PG	Ali Mezher	Luay Salha	Thierry Derjani

== Notable foreign players ==
Note: Flags indicate national team eligibility at FIBA-sanctioned events. Players may hold other non-FIBA nationalities not displayed.

Criteria

To appear in this section a player must have either:

- Set a club record or won an individual award while at the club
- Played at least one official international match for their national team at any time
- Played at least one official NBA match at any time.

- (Croatia) Ratko Varda
- (France) Herve Toure
- (Egypt) Samir Gouda
- (United States) Pierre Jackson
- (United States) Steve Burtt Jr.
- (United States) Sherell Ford
- (United States) Darryl Watkins
- (United States) Scotty Thurman
- (United States) Samaki Walker
- (United States) DerMarr Johnson
- (United States) Amal McCaskill
- (United States) Cliff Alexander
- (United States) Shabazz Muhammad
- (United States) Jumaine Jones
- (United States) Quincy Douby
- (United States) Alvin Sims
- (United States) Cleanthony Early
- (United States) Jonathan Gibson
- (United States) Zach Lofton
- (Ukraine) Oleksiy Pecherov
- (France) Sekou Doumbouya

== Notable coaches ==
- (Lebanon) Ghassan Sarkis
- (Greece) Ilias Zouros
- (Serbia) Veselin Matic
- (Serbia) Dragan Raca
- (United States) Tab Baldwin
- (Greece) (Cyprus) Linos Gavriel

== See also ==
- Sagesse SC (football)
