= Aziz Diagne =

Senegalese-American artist

- Born: 1957 (age 68–69); Thiès, Senegal
- Known for: Reverse glass painting, Intaglio printmaking, Collagraphy
- Movement: Contemporary African Diaspora art
- Website: www.azizdiagne.com

Aziz Diagne (born 1957) is a Senegalese-born American artist based in Los Angeles. He is known for his work in peinture sous verre (reverse glass painting) and for developing a single-run intaglio printmaking process known as the "Aziz Method". Diagne has exhibited nationally and internationally, created public works including the 1996 Olympic Games Cultural Olympiad banners, and received awards such as the 2025 Beverly Hills Art Show's "Most Original Artwork" prize. He is the founder of Aziz Gallerie in Leimert Park Village, a fine arts gallery dedicated to underrepresented artists.

== Early life and education ==
Diagne was born in Thiès, Senegal, in 1957. He studied at Lycée Delafosse in Dakar, graduating with a B.A. in 1981. He is largely self-taught, and his early training included exposure to traditional Senegalese crafts such as rock carving, ceramics, wood sculpture, murals, and tapestry, as well as Thiesoise (reverse glass painting).

== Career ==
After working in Senegal and Europe, Diagne relocated to the United States and established his practice in Los Angeles in the 1980s. He has lived and worked in the Leimert Park neighborhood for more than 35 years, becoming a central figure in the community.

His practice spans printmaking, painting, collagraphs, carving, and mixed media. He developed the "Aziz Method," a process of calibrating and inking intaglio plates to produce multiple colors in a single run.

Diagne has traveled throughout Africa, Europe, and South America, experiences that have influenced his work and themes of migration, memory, and belonging.

His art has appeared in popular media, including set decoration for Poetic Justice (1993), Vampire in Brooklyn (1995), Antwone Fisher (2002), HBO's Insecure, Snowfall, Moesha (1996–2001), and Bob Hearts Abishola. His works have been featured in music videos such as Michael Jackson's "Smooth Operator" and Erykah Badu's "Next Lifetime". He has also made acting appearances, including roles in Antwone Fisher, HBO's Insecure, and HGTV's Carol Duvall Show.

=== Teaching and mentorship ===
Since 2022, Diagne has taught art at 42nd Street Elementary School in Los Angeles, instructing 60–89 students weekly. He founded Aziz Gallerie in Leimert Park, one of the first fine-art spaces in Los Angeles dedicated to African and diasporic artists. He later established a gallery in South Central Los Angeles devoted to emerging artists, and has provided free studio space and mentorship in Leimert Park. Internationally, he created a training program in Senegal to help artisans master reverse glass painting.

== Personal life ==
Diagne has resided in Los Angeles for more than three decades, particularly in the Leimert Park neighborhood.

== Works ==
=== Selected works ===
- Mother's Day (2023), oil on canvas
- Can You See Me (2023), oil on canvas
- You & Me (2023), oil on canvas
- The Other Side of Me (2023), oil on paper
- The Gift (2023), reverse glass painting
- In the Garden (2023), reverse glass painting

=== Exhibitions (selected) ===
- La Belle Gallery – New Orleans, Louisiana (2023)
- Prizm Art Fair at Art Basel Miami (2023)
- 20th Anniversary Exhibition – Joyce Gordon Gallery, Oakland (2023)
- Works by Aziz Diagne – The World Stage, Los Angeles (2017)

=== Public works and commissions ===
- Official Commemorative Artist, 1996 Olympic Games Cultural Olympiad, Atlanta
- Festival banners, New Orleans Jazz and Heritage Festival (1995, 1998, 2003)
- Advertising materials, National Black Arts Festival (Atlanta)
- Posters for the African Marketplace, Los Angeles (1995, 2002)

== Awards and recognition ==
- Winner, Vision Theatre Mural Project (*The Music Factory*), Los Angeles Department of Cultural Affairs (2025)
- Most Original Artwork, Beverly Hills Art Show (2025)
- Commendations from the California State Senate, California State Assembly, and City of Los Angeles (2025)
- Tom Joyner Foundation Annual Fantastic Voyage artist (2000–2015)
- Festival at Lake Merritt, Oakland (1987–1995)
- National Black Arts Festival, Atlanta (1989–2006)
- Essence Music Festival, New Orleans (2000)
