= Aziz Hitou =

Belgian futsal player

Hitou
Personal information
- Full name: Aziz Hitou
- Date of birth: 1 February 1990 (age 36)
- Place of birth: Belgium
- Position: Winger

Team information
- Current team: Antwerpen

International career
Years	Team	Apps	(Gls)
- Belgium

Aziz Hitou (born 1 February 1990) is a Belgian futsal player who plays for Futsal Topsport Antwerpen and the Belgian national futsal team.
