= Aziz Ahmad =

Aziz Ahmad may refer to:

== People ==
- Aziz Ahmad (buzkashi) (born 1964), Afghanistan buzkashi player
- Aziz Ahmad (footballer) (born 1930), Malaysian footballer
- Aziz Ahmad (writer) (1914–1978), Urdu poet, writer, historian, and critic from Pakistan

== See also ==
- Aziz Ahmed (disambiguation)
