= Aziz Abdul Muniru =

Ghanaian politician

Member of the Ghana Parliament for Akan Constituency

Personal details
- Party: National Democratic Congress

Aziz Abdul Muniru is a Ghanaian politician and member of the Seventh Parliament of the Fourth Republic of Ghana representing the Akan Constituency in the Volta Region on the ticket of the National Democratic Congress.

== Education ==
He graduated from Kwame Nkrumah University of Science and Technology with an M.S.C. and a B.S.C. in procurement management.

Additionally, he holds professional memberships with the Ghana Institute of Surveyors (MGhIS) and the Ghana Institute of Construction (MGIOC).

== Politics ==
Muniru is a member of National Democratic Congress. He contested for the 2016 Ghanaian general election on the ticket of National Democratic Congress and won the Akan constituency in the Volta Region. He won the election with 13,941 which is equivalent to 51.05% of the total votes. He won the election over Kofi Adjei Ntim who was a parliamentary candidate for New Patriotic Party who polled 9,730 representing 35.63%, IND parliamentary candidate Joseph Kwadwo Ofori had 3,486 representing 12.77% and Jonathan Tetteh who was APC parliamentary candidate polled 149 representing 0.55% of the total votes.
