= Antoine Choueiri =

Lebanese media executive (1939–2010)

- Born: August 3, 1939; Beirut, Lebanon
- Died: March 9, 2010 (aged 70); Lebanon
- Occupations: Businessman, CEO, mass media owner

Antoine Choueiri (Arabic: أنطوان الشويري)(August 3, 1939 – March 9, 2010) was a billionaire Lebanese media executive. He was the founder of Choueiri Group, the Middle East's largest media broker.

== Life ==
Choueiri was born in Beirut in 1939 to a Maronite Christian family from Bsharri. He married Rose Salameh in 1961, who gave birth to two children, Pierre and Lena.

Choueiri died on March 9, 2010, of health complications. He is buried in his ancestral home of Bsharri. In his honor one of Bsharri's main streets will be named "Antoine Choueiri" in homage to him and his achievements.

Choueiri was one of the leading lebanese businessmen with Choueiri Group, a leading MEA media broker, he is also regarded as the "Founding father" and "Godfather" of Lebanese basketball, due to his huge contributions to the sport as a whole, and to Sagesse BC in particular.

== Choueiri Group ==
At the height of its powers, the company that he founded, the Choueiri Group, controlled (through Choueiri's companies: Arabian Media Services International, MEMS, Arabian Outdoor, Times International, Audio Visual Media, C Media, Press Media, Digital Media Services, Interadio, Promofair, AMC and SECOMM) the flow of advertising for the following enterprises:

=== Television ===
- Arabic entertainment: Arabia Drama, MBC Masr
- General entertainment: MBC1, Al Watan TV Kuwait, LBCI, Dubai TV, Sama Dubai TV, MBC Masr, MBC Drama
- Indian and Western and sports, youth entertainment: MBC2, MBC4, Dubai One, MBC Action, MBC MAX, MBC Bollywood, Dubai Sports, Dubai Racing Channel
- News channels: Al Arabiya, Al Arabiya Al-Hadath
- Music channels: Melody Hits, Mazzika, Zoom, Wanasah, Melody FM
- Kids' channels: MBC3
- Sports & youth channels: Dubai Sports Channel, Dubai Racing Channel

=== Outdoor ===
- Mupis (MUPI market leader in the GCC with a total of 12880 faces)
- LamPosts (The LamPost sign is a backlit double sided panel. It displays a high-grade flexface printed poster with an image size of 1 M x 3 M.)
- Megacoms (single or double-sided stand size: 3M X 4M)
- Unipolses: frontlit or backlit (large format with sizes up to 18 M x 6 M, with the advertising message printed in digital technology on flexible vinyl material)

=== Newspapers ===
- UAE: Al Bayan (the official Arabic newspaper of Dubai), Emarat Al Youm, Emirates Business 247.com, Al Hayat (the "International Arabic Daily Newspaper")
- Lebanon: An-Nahar Arabic Daily, L'Orient Le Jour, As-Safir, Al Hayat
- KSA: Al Yaum

=== Magazines ===
- Lebanon: Noun (Lebanon's leading French monthly women's magazine), Commerce Du Levant (Lebanon's leading French monthly business magazine), Santé Beauté (French beauty and health magazine), L'orient Junior (monthly French teenage magazine)
- Kuwait: Samra Magazine (launched in 1993, a family oriented, society, fashion and lifestyle monthly magazine)
- Pan-Arab: Jamalouki (an Arabic language monthly magazine, circulated in Arab countries; targets Arab women), Al Hadath Al Riyadi (an Arabic language specialized sports monthly magazine, circulated in Arab countries), Laha Magazine (launched in September 2000, a pan-Arab weekly family magazine), Ara Magazine (launched in October 2011 as the first and only magazine published by the media body of the government of Dubai, DMI)

=== Radio ===
- Lebanon: Radio One, Mix FM, Light FM, Radio Liban Libre, Melody FM
- Pan-Arab: MBC FM, Panorama FM, Noor Dubai FM, Hala FM, Hi FM

=== Internet ===
- Actionha.net
- Alarabiya.net
- Albayan.ae
- Anghami App
- Annahar.com
- Arabia.Eurosport.com
- Cinescape.com
- Daralhayat.com
- Emaratalyoum.com
- Emirates247.com
- Gheir.com
- Hawaaworld.com
- Jamalouki.net
- Kooora.com
- Lahamag.com
- Lorientlejour.com
- MBC.net
- MBC3.net
- Nawa3em.com
- Ounousa.com
- Sabq.org
- Shahid.net

=== Cinema ===
Cinescape Cinescape manages all cinema halls in Kuwait.
