= Aziz Chouaki =

Algerian writer (1951–2019)

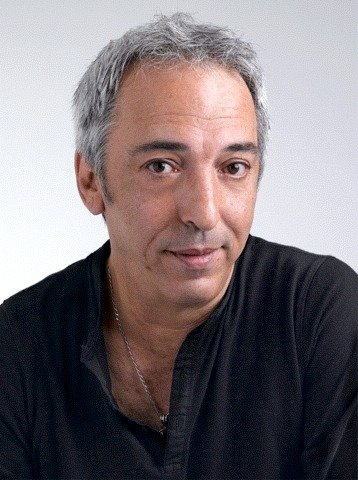
- Born: 1951; Tizi Rashed, Algeria
- Died: 2019 (aged 67–68); France
- Spouse: Nasrin Chouaki

Aziz Chouaki (Arabic: عزيز شواكي) was born in 1951 in Tizi Rached, Algeria. He died in France, 2019. He was a writer and playwright known for his somewhat daring political and literary views. His literary works include the novel Baya- Algerian Rapsodia which was published in 1988, and the play Oranges, which was published in 1997. In the play, he documented Algerian history from 1990 to 1997.

== Early life and education ==
Aziz lived with his mother, who is a French teacher, in the Algerian capital. His mother used to read him the stories of Charles Perrault in French and Berber. Aziz was fond of the Irish writer James Joyce. In addition, he liked jazz and rock music, and sometimes folk music, which he used to listen to in Algerian concerts.

In 1991, Aziz was forced to leave Algeria to live in France due to the civil war, especially after some ‘extremists’ placed him on the assassination list.

== Career ==
Aziz published his first novel Baya- Algerian Rapsodia in 1988, which was republished in Paris 30 years later by Bleu Autour publications. He used a very sharp style in this novel to a level that some critics described as "weird". He wrote this novel the way youngsters talk in the capital slums.

Aziz published Oranges in 1997. According to some critics, Oranges made a significant mark in the history of Francophone theatre. In 2011, he published The Star of Algiers, which was translated into several languages. The hero of this novel is Moussa Massy, who dreamed of being the Michael Jackson of Algeria before he became an extremist.

== Opinions ==
While he was writing his autobiography, he supported the Algerian protests that erupted on February 22, 2019.

== Works ==
Some of his notable works:

- Baya- Algerian Rapsodia (novel)
- Oranges (play)
- The Star of Algiers (novel)
