= Aziz Abdelmassih =

Lebanese basketball player (born 1996)

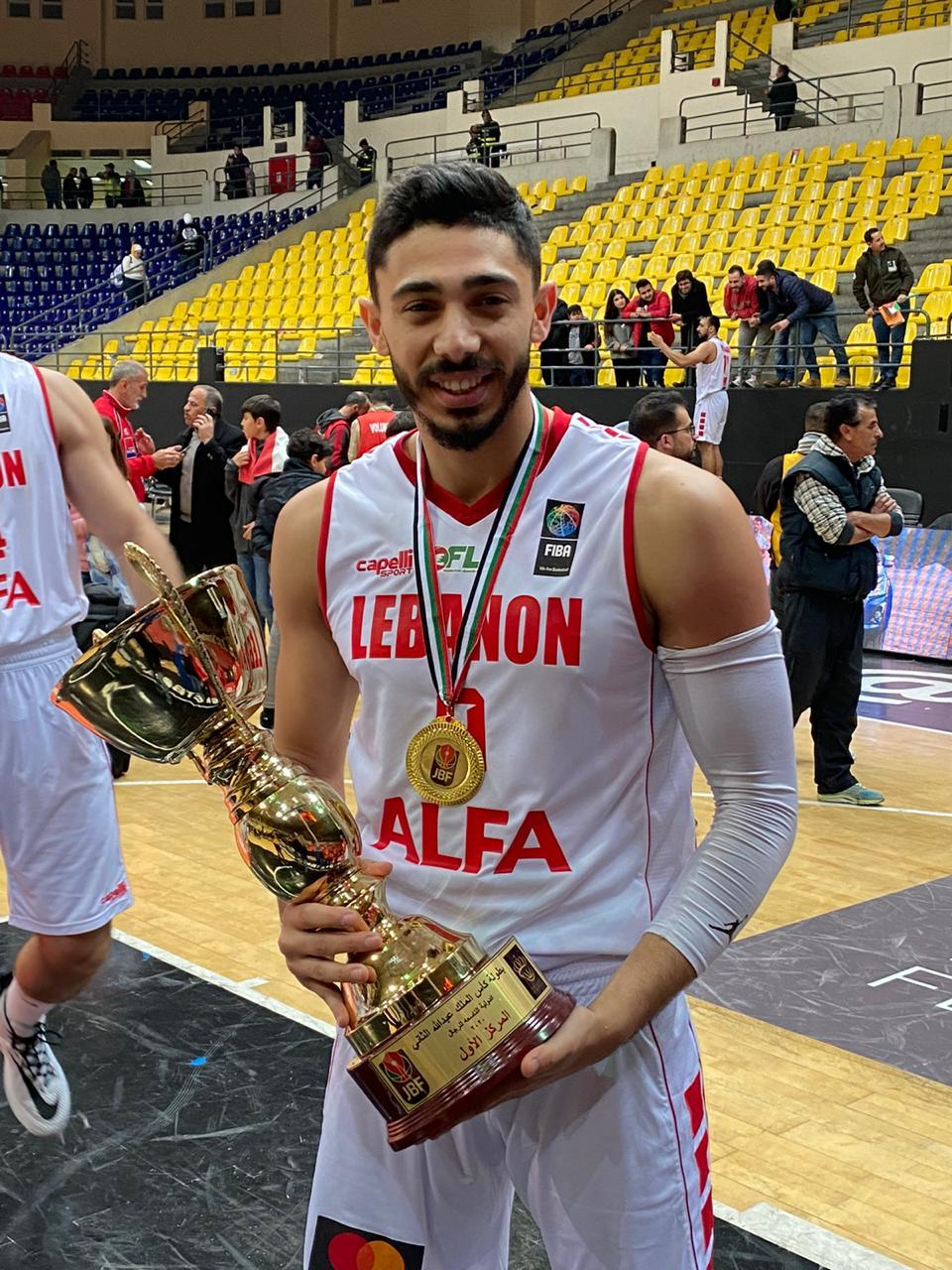

No. 0 – Sagesse SC
- Position: Guard
- League: Lebanese Basketball League; West Asia Super League

Personal information
- Born: July 22, 1996 (age 30) Beirut, Lebanon
- Listed height: 1.92 m (6 ft 4 in)
- Listed weight: 87 kg (192 lb)

Career information
- College: Lebanese American University
- Playing career: 2016–present

Career history
- 2016–2017: Tadamon
- 2017–2019: Sagesse SC
- 2019–2020: Champville SC
- 2020–2025: Sagesse SC
- 2025–2026: Homenetmen
- 2026–present: Sagesse SC

Career highlights
- All-Lebanese League Honorable Mention (2019)

Aziz Abdelmassih (Arabic: عزيز عبد المسيح; also spelled Abd El-Massih, Abdel Massih) is a Lebanese professional basketball player for Sagesse SC of the Lebanese Basketball League. He also represents the Lebanese national team in international competitions.

== Early life and education ==
Aziz Abdelmassih was born on July 22, 1996, in Beirut, Lebanon. He attended Saints-Coeurs Ain Najm school, where he started playing basketball at a young age. Abdelmassih graduated from school in 2014. He juggled attending university and basketball training, and graduated from the Lebanese American University in 2020 in civil engineering. During his study at LAU, Abdelmassih was the LAU basketball team captain.

== Professional career ==
Abdelmassih is recognized as a rising star, and an MVP. In season 2015–2016, he was scouted by Tadamon Head Coach Paul Caughter while he was still playing in Division 2 with Club Central Jounieh. Abdelmassih began playing professionally with Tadamon Cub in the 2016–2017 season. In season 2017–2018, he signed with Sagesse Club, and had an impressive season, helping his team reaching the Final Four.

In 2019, Abdelmassih was called for the first time to the Lebanon men's National basketball Team. He was named again All-Lebanese League Honorable Mention, and the most improved player in Lebanon for his performance with Sagesse.

In 2020, he played with Champville and made it to the finals, the team lost to Al Riyadi Beirut. He then rejoined Sagesse Club as of season 2021, and was the team's best scorer. Abdelmassih was a top scorer for the Lebanon national team in the 2021 FIBA Asia Cup qualifiers.
