= Muazzez =

Muazzez is a Turkish given name for females. People named Muazzez include:

- Muazzez Abacı (1947–2025), Turkish singer
- Muazzez İlmiye Çığ (1914–2024), Turkish archaeologist
- Muazzez Ersoy (born 1958), Turkish classical and folk singer
- Hatice Muazzez Sultan (c.1627 – 1687), consort and third Haseki of Ottoman Sultan Ibrahim I

See also

- 3396 Muazzez, outer main-belt asteroid
