= Aziz Sağlam =

Turkish-Belgian futsal player

Aziz Sağlam (also known as Saglam Azziz in Belgium) (born 6 August 1982) is a Turkish-Belgian futsal player. He currently plays for BC Embourg and previously played for Onu Seraing and RP Ans.

He is a member of the Turkey national football team in the UEFA Futsal Championship.
