= Azizul Islam (disambiguation) =

Azizul Islam (Arabic: عزيز الإسلام) is a masculine given name and surname of Arabic origin. Notable people with the name include:

== Given name ==
- Azizul Islam (born 1944) is a Bangladeshi flutist

== Surname ==
- A. B. Mirza Azizul Islam (born 1941), Bangladeshi bureaucrat
- Kazi Azizul Islam (died 1971), Bengali civil servant
- Md Azizul Islam (born 1995), Bangladeshi politician

== See also ==
- Qamar al-Islam
