= Azizam (restaurant) =

Restaurant in Los Angeles, California, U.S.

Coordinates: 34.0837°N 118.2737°W

- Interactive map of Azizam

Restaurant information
- Established: March 2024
- Owners: Cody Ma, Misha Sesar
- Food type: Iranian
- Location: 2943 W Sunset Blvd, Los Angeles, California, United States
- Reservations: No
- Website: azizamla.com

Azizam is an Iranian restaurant in Los Angeles, California, United States. It was named one of the 50 Best Restaurants in the US by the New York Times, one of the twenty best new restaurants of 2024 by Bon Appétit,, one of the 101 Best Restaurants in Los Angeles by the Los Angeles Times in 2024 & 2025 and one of the best new restaurants of 2024 by Esquire Magazine
