= Gardi, India =

Village in Maharashtra

Gardi town
- village
- Location in Maharashtra, India Gardi (India)
- Coordinates: 17°18′32″N 74°31′47″E
- Country: India
- State: Maharashtra
- District: Sangli district
- Talukas: Khanapur (Vita)

Languages
  - Official: Marathi
- Time zone: UTC+5:30 (IST)
- Nearest city: Vita
- Lok Sabha constituency: Sangli
- Vidhan Sabha constituency: Khanapur-Atpadi

Gardi is a village situated in Sangli district, Khanapur (Vita) taluka, Pune division of Maharashtra, India. It falls under desh or Paschim Maharashtra region. Gardi village is a birthplace of Anilbhau Babar (MLA Maharashtra).

== Geography ==
Nearby cities : Vita, Mahuli, Tasgaon, Uran Islampur

== Demographics ==
Language spoken : Marathi

Pin code : 415311
