= Aziz Hamid Madni =

Pakistani poet and writer

Aziz Hamid Madni (Urdu: عزیز حامد مدنی); (15 June 1922 – 23 April 1991) was a notable Pakistani poet and writer. He was born in Raipur, British India.

== Poetry collection ==
He was notable for the following poetry collections:

- Jadeed Urdu Shaeri
- Dasht-i-Imkan
- Chashm-i-Nigran
- Nakhl-i- Guman
