= Aziz El Khanchaf =

Moroccan-French footballer (born 1977)

Personal information
- Date of birth: 25 August 1977 (age 49)
- Place of birth: Orléans, France
- Height: 1.71 m (5 ft 7 in)
- Position: Attacking midfielder

Senior career*
Years	Team	Apps	(Gls)
1996–2000	Laval	79	(17)
2000–2002	Wasquehal Lille Métropole	54	(13)
2002–2004	RC Paris	46	(14)
2004–2006	Ronse	31	(14)
2006–2007	Mons	23	(8)
2007–2009	Red Star Waasland	62	(18)
2009	Boussu Dour Borinage	24	(9)
2010	Willebroek-Meerhof	9	(5)
2010–2013	La Louvière Centre	85	(19)
Total		413	(117)
- * Club domestic league appearances and goals

Aziz El Khanchaf (born 25 August 1977) is a French former professional footballer who played as a midfielder.

== Career ==
El Khanchaf played for Laval, Wasquehal, RC Paris, Ronse, Mons, Red Star Waasland, Boussu Dour Borinage, Willebroek-Meerhof and La Louvière Centre. He made his professional debut for Laval on 2 October 1996 in a 4–1 Ligue 2 loss to LB Châteauroux, coming on for the injured Stéphane Pédron in the 36th minute. He scored his first goal on 2 November 1996 in a 3–1 league win over Red Star.
