= Azeez Amida =

Nigerian business executive

- Born: 15 August 1983 (age 43); Shomolu, Lagos
- Occupations: Nigerian business executive, author and speaker
- Known for: CEO of Pan African Tower

Azeez Amida is a Nigerian business executive, author and speaker. He is the founder of Azeez Amida Foundation. He previously served as CEO of Pan African Tower. He is also a member of the Forbes Council since 2022. Amida serves as the founder of the Nigeria Showtime Flag Football.

== Early life ==
Azeez Amida was born on 15 August 1983 in Shomolu, Lagos. Amida grew up in Lagos before he later moved to Ogun State where he attended Olabisi Onabanjo University. In 2008, he obtained his Bachelor of Science, Economics. In 2016, Amida attended the IE Business School, Madrid and got his Master of Business Administration. He was also an associate member at the Chartered Institute of Management Accountants.

== Career ==
Amida started his career working as a portfolio manager at Meristem Securities. Between 2014 and 2021, Amida has served in various capacities working with IHS Towers. In 2020, he was appointed CEO of IHS Rwanda. Before being CEO, he had also served as the CFO of IHS Rwanda. After his time at IHS, he joined Merit Telecoms on an advisory basis as Chief Growth and Operations officer.

In 2022, he was appointed CEO of Pan African Towers. In November 2024, Amida resigned from his role as Managing Director and Chief Executive Officer (CEO) of Pan African Towers. He is also the founder of the SFFL Showtime.

== Philanthropy ==
In May 2022, he founded the Azeez Amida Foundation to focus on poverty, clean water, education and healthcare. In November 2022, the Azeez Amida Foundation supported victims of the Bayelsa Flood with relieve packages. In November 2022, through his foundation he refurbished Ogun Primary Healthcare Centre.

== Books ==
- EPE Principle
