= Aziz (qiyan) =

Arab qiyan poet and musician

Aziz (fl. 822), was a qiyan poet and musician, active in the Umayyad state of Córdoba.

She was the royal slave concubine of Caliph Al-Hakam I (r. 796–822).

Aziz was described as a beautiful and accomplished singer. As a slave she was trained to become a qiyan entertainer, and became so accomplished as a singer that her enslaver, the Caliph, selected her for sexual service as one of his concubines; she later became the mother of some of his children.

In Classical Arabic literature, she is included in Masālik al-abṣār fī mamālik al-amṣār by Ibn Fadlallah al-Umari (1301–1349), in the main work describing famous slave singers of history.
