= Azziz Irmal =

Algerian footballer (born 1980)

Personal information
- Date of birth: June 2, 1980 (age 45)
- Place of birth: Algeria
- Position: Defender

Senior career*
Years	Team	Apps	(Gls)
1999–2003	MC Alger		
2004–2005	US Chaouia		
2005–2006	A Bou Saâda		
2006	CS Constantine		
2006–2007	Tersana		
2007	ASM Oran		
2007–2008	CR Belouizdad		
- * Club domestic league appearances and goals

Azziz Irmal (born June 2, 1980) is a retired Algerian footballer. He played as a defender.
