= Azize =

Azize is a Turkish female given name. Notable people with the name include:

- Azize Erdoğan (born 1996), Turkish women's football player
- Azize Hlali (born 1989), French-Moroccan Muay Thai fighter
- Azize Raguig (born 1975), Moroccan boxer
- Azize Tanrıkulu (born 1986), Turkish taekwondo athlete
