= Gardi, Nepal =

Gardi गर्दी
- Village development committee
- Location in Nepal at chitwan district madi valley
- Coordinates: 27.47°N 84.29°E
- Country: Nepal
- Province: Bagmati Province
- District: Chitwan District

Population (2011)
  - Total: 9,241
- Time zone: UTC+5:45 (Nepal Time)

Gardi was a village development committee in Chitwan District in Bagmati Province of mid-southern Nepal before merging into Madi Municipality. At the time of the 2011 Nepal census it had a population of 9,241 people (4,061 male; 5,180 female) living in 2,168 individual households. Sitalpur (सितलपुर) is the largest village inside Gardi.

Someswor Higher Secondary School is the highest ranked education institution in Gardi with several lower secondary and primary schools. Baruwa is the largest market place, second largest in Madi after Basantapur bazar. Riu (रीऊ), Chitai (चितई), Bhutyaha (भूत्याहा), Dangre (डाङ्ग्रे), Marath (मरठ) rivers are some of the famous rivers (Khola खोला in Nepali) of Gardi.
