= Aziz Balagoun =

Beninese footballer

Personal information
- Date of birth: 8 April 1981 (age 45)
- Place of birth: Porto-Novo, Benin
- Height: 1.88 m (6 ft 2 in)
- Position: Goalkeeper

Team information
- Current team: K.M.S.K. Deinze
- Number: 30

Youth career
- 1996–1999: Génération 2000 FC
- 2000–2001: Espoir Plus FC
- 2001–2002: UNB FC
- 2002–2003: Bury F.C.
- 2003–2004: FC Saint Josse

Senior career*
Years	Team	Apps	(Gls)
2004–2008	Royal Leopold Ukkel FC	0	(0)
2008	R.C. Sartois	0	(0)
2009–	K.M.S.K. Deinze	1	(0)

International career
2005–	Benin	6	(0)
- * Club domestic league appearances and goals as of 16 October 2008

Aziz Balagoun (born 8 April 1981) is a Beninese professional footballer. He currently plays in Belgium for K.M.S.K. Deinze.

== Career ==
Balagoun left Royal Leopold Ukkel FC in summer 2008 and signed a contract with R.C. Sartois. After six months with the club, he was transferred to K.M.S.K. Deinze.

Balagoun previously played for Génération 2000 FC, Espoir Plus FC, UNB FC (Benin), Bury F.C. and FC Saint Josse.

== International career ==
He played his first game for Benin 2005.
