= Aziz Khan =

Aziz Khan or Mohammed Aziz Khan may refer to:

== People ==
- Aziz Khan (general) (born 1947), former chairman of Joint Chiefs of Staff of Pakistan Army
- Aziz Ahmed Khan (born 1943), Pakistan Ambassador to India
- Aziz Ahmed Khan (politician) (born 1978), Indian politician
- Aziz Khan (squash player), Pakistani squash player
- Aziz Khan Mokri (1792–1871), Iranian military officer and grandee
- Mohammad Aziz Khan (1877–1933), Afghan prince and diplomat
- Mohammed Aziz Khan (businessman) (born 1955), Singaporean billionaire
