= Aziz Gardi =

Kurdish writer and translator from Iraq

- عەزیز گەردی
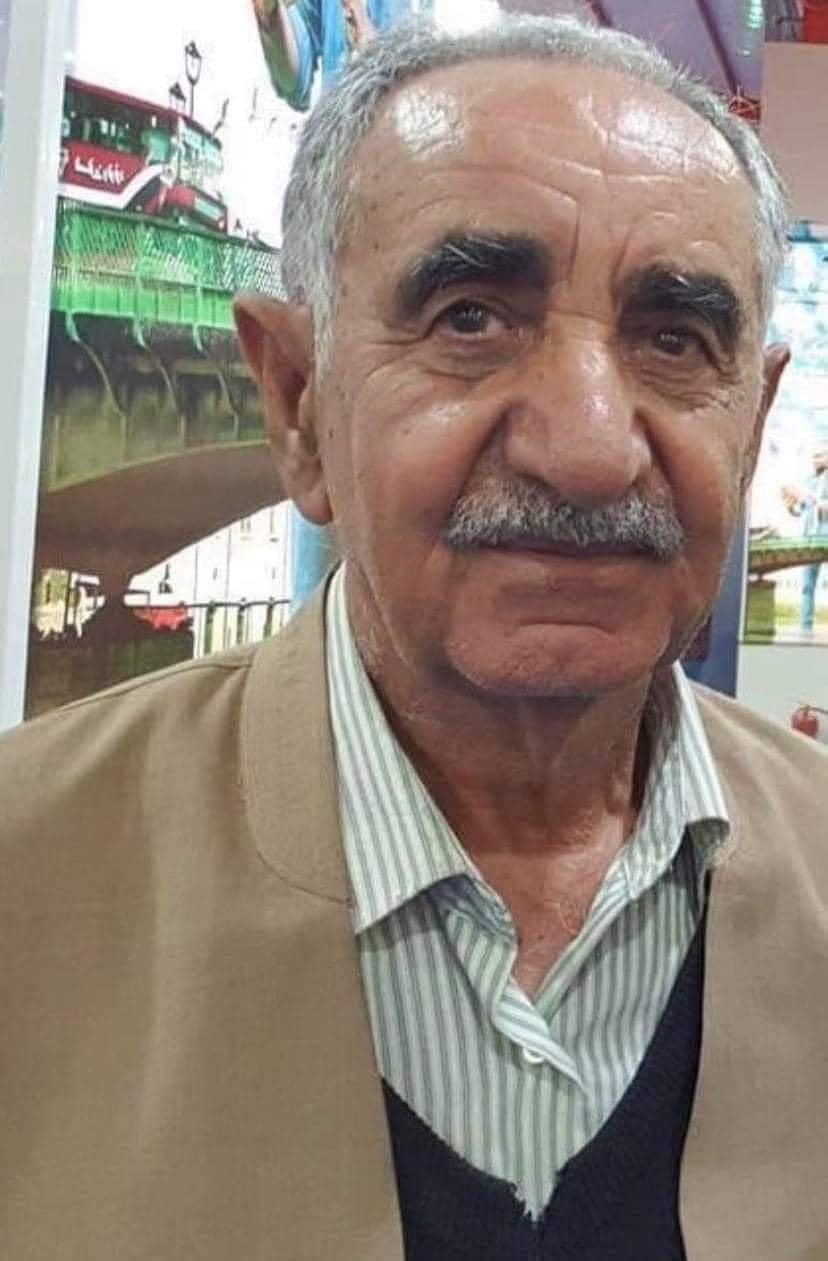
- Born: Aziz Ahmad Abdullah; January 1, 1947; Bahrka, Erbil Governorate, Iraq
- Died: June 6, 2022 (aged 75); Erbil, Iraq
- Education: University of Mosul, University of Baghdad, Salahaddin University, Koya University
- Occupations: Writer, translator, academic
- Years active: 1970–2022
- Known for: Kurdish literary translation, coining Kurdish terminology
- Notable work: Translation of Romeo and Juliet, Divine Comedy, My Dagestan

Aziz Gardi (Kurdish: عەزیز گەردی; 1947 – 6 June 2022) was a prominent Kurdish writer, translator, and academic from Iraq. Born Aziz Ahmad Abdullah in Bahrka near Erbil, he became the most renowned Kurdish translator, having translated approximately 200 books, mostly literary works, into the Sorani dialect of Kurdish.

== Early life and education ==
Gardi was born in 1947 in Bahrka, a small town near Erbil in the Kurdistan Region of Iraq. He completed his primary, secondary, and preparatory education in Bahrka before pursuing higher education.

Gardi earned multiple academic degrees throughout his career:

- Bachelor's degree in French language from the University of Mosul
- Master's degree in Kurdish literature from Salahaddin University in 1994, with a thesis titled "Kurdish Classical Meters Compared with Arabic Prosody and Persian Meters: An Analytic Comparative Study"
- PhD in Kurdish literature from Salahaddin University in 1999, with a dissertation titled "Rhyme: An Analytic Comparative Study in Kurdish Poetry"
- Second PhD in English Literature from Koya University in 2009, with a dissertation titled "Romeo & Juliet and Mam & Zin: A Comparative Study"

== Academic and literary career ==
Gardi began his literary career at age 21 when he started writing his first book on rhetoric in Kurdish literature in 1968, which was published in 1970 as the first Kurdish work on literary rhetoric. His first published translation appeared in 1976, a novella titled Three Drawings by Alexei Balakayev, published by the Kurdish Academy Center in Baghdad.

He served as a professor at the College of Arts at Salahaddin University and achieved the academic rank of professor. Gardi was fluent in five languages: Kurdish (both Sorani and Kurmanji), English, French, Arabic, and Persian.

=== Professional memberships ===
- Member of the Kurdish Writers' Union (from 1970)
- Member of the Iraqi Journalists Association (from 1976)
- Member of the Translation Society (from 1984)

== Translation work ==
Gardi translated approximately 200 books, most of them literary masterpieces from world literature. His translations were known for their poetic language combined with everyday expressions, resulting from his extensive reading and deep understanding of literature.

=== Notable translations ===
Literary works:

- My Dagestan by Rasul Gamzatov
- Divine Comedy by Dante Alighieri (all three parts: Inferno, Purgatorio, Paradiso)
- Romeo and Juliet by William Shakespeare
- Poetics by Aristotle
- Kurdish Mythology by M. B. Rudenko
- Grimms' Fairy Tales by the Brothers Grimm
- Works by Leo Tolstoy
- Works by Oriana Fallaci

Other works:

- Three Drawings by Alexei Balakayev (1976)
- Plays by Federico García Lorca (1984)
- Various folk tales and mythologies from Armenian, African, Slavic, and Turkish traditions

=== Linguistic contributions ===
Gardi coined many new words in Sorani Kurdish through his translations, including:

- پێشخزمەت (pêshxizmet) for "garçon"
- وارخان (warxan) for "apartment"
- هازی (hazî) for "energy"
- خێراکار (xêrakar) for "computer"
- کۆڕی زانیاری (korî zaniyarî) for "academy"
- زانستگایی (zanstigayî) for "academic"

== Translation philosophy and methodology ==
For Gardi, translation was more than mere linguistic conversion; he viewed it as "rewriting or even inventing a new work." He stated: "Knowing a language does not mean you can translate it. Translating is inventing a new work, like any piece of literature."

His meticulous approach to translation was legendary. He reportedly reviewed his translation of My Dagestan more than ten times and was still not satisfied with it. On one occasion in 1982, he traveled 46 kilometers just to find the right words while translating The Kurdish Woman's Life by Henny Harald Hansen.

== Challenges and controversies ==
Gardi faced significant challenges in his work, including the absence of proper Kurdish dictionaries and a shortage of books translated into Kurdish from Western languages. He essentially had to build Kurdish literary translation from scratch.

He once narrowly escaped assassination by radical Islamists due to his translation of The Kurdish Women, part of The Women of Turkey and Their Folk-Lore by Lucy Garnett. The book included stories about mullahs that highlighted corruption among some religious figures, which incited extremist mullahs to plot his assassination. A friend who learned of the plot warned him and saved his life.

== Personal life and character ==
Gardi lived a largely solitary life, dedicating himself entirely to his literary work. When a close friend suggested he get married, he reportedly responded: "My books, my library is my wife." His solitude has been compared to that of Emily Dickinson or J. D. Salinger, whose creativity led them to a life of isolation.

He maintained independence from Kurdish political parties throughout his life, believing one could serve their nation through writing and translation without direct political involvement.

== Legacy and influence ==
Gardi's work significantly influenced a generation of Kurdish translators. Notable translators who were inspired by his work include:

- Azad Berzinji, who was motivated to pursue translation after reading Gardi's translation of My Dagestan
- Atta Qaradaghi, whom Gardi personally encouraged during his college years
- Adeeb Nader, who acknowledged Gardi's influence on his career choice

== Death ==
Gardi suffered from kidney problems and underwent surgery in March 2022. Due to kidney failure, he went abroad for treatment where one kidney was removed. After returning to Erbil, his remaining kidney became problematic. He was admitted to the private Jin Hospital in Erbil in early June 2022.

Aziz Gardi died on 6 June 2022, at Jin Hospital in Erbil due to kidney failure. Following his death, a group of artists, writers, and intellectuals issued a statement requesting that President Nechirvan Barzani preserve Gardi's library in a national museum.

== Published works ==
=== Original writings ===
- Rhetoric in Kurdish Literature (1972)
- Literature and Criticism (1974)
- Foreign Literature (1982)
- Classical Kurdish Poetry Meters (1999)
- Guide to Classical Poetry Meters (2003)
- The Whirlpool of Death (2008)
- Kurdish Prosody (2014)

== See also ==
- Kurdish literature
- Sorani
- Kurdish language
- List of Kurdish people
