= Aziz (artist) =

Indian painter

- Born: Mohammed Azizuddin; Hyderabad, India

Aziz (born 1946) is an Indian artist and painter from Hyderabad, Andhra Pradesh. He has pioneered the use of plaster of paris on canvas along with oil paints for a three-dimensional effect. His colour platte includes reds, white to earthy browns giving his art work more natural tones. He is known to be a reclusive artiste and for his unique style and technique. He specializes in a style of relief font murals using Plaster of Paris, and oil painting. His muses are recreating landscapes, forts, temples, and horses, all part of his early life inspirations.

== Journey ==
He started his career in Hyderabad after graduation by painting that suited to rich clients. He used to take his paintings on a cycle or by foot to clients in Banjara Hills. He struggled a lot until his work gained acceptance and recognition. The Golconda fort, unique granite rock formations of the Deccan plateau, and the famed banyan trees with their aerial prop roots have all been subjects of Aziz’s intense exploration.

Aziz’s artistic expressions are timely, because his works have helped capture the old horizons of a city whose skyline has morphed into a vertical medly of concrete structures. Whether the granite finds its way into people’s kitchens and houses, or banyan trees are felled to make way for road-widening programs, thanks to Aziz’s fastidious attention to detail, Hyderabad’s rich patrimony is captured, and kept alive and well through remarkable renditions that inspire awe and nurture the conservationist in each of us.

== Technique ==
Aziz has pioneered the use of a unique, masterly technique of creating ‘three dimensional reliefs’ on canvas. A combination of color, depth and granularity define this particular genre. The masterful blending of paint and oil-explained as a “suitable expression of my inner self” -is not confined to any set pattern, nor does it reside in any particular school of expression. Rather, Aziz’s works and media used-watercolors, oils and charcoals-have a unique appeal that evolves of out of the amount of detail in them. His work is generally executed on canvas. Plaster of Paris mixed with Zinc oxide is brought to required consistency and applied on pretreated canvas. A knife is used to sculpt and work on the texture and consistency of the subject. The finished relief is painted with oil paints to bring about the profundity of a three dimensional effect. This technique is a blend of painting and sculpture which has been developed and mastered by Aziz.

== Works and exhibits ==
Aziz since the 80s has exhibited in Europe, South Asia and South Africa. His works of art today adorn private collections in Denmark, Germany, Iceland, India, Japan, Pakistan, South Africa, Sweden, Qatar, the United Kingdom and the United States, and his beloved home city of Hyderabad amongst others.Aziz resurfaced in South Africa in 2010 to mark the 150th anniversary of Indians in South Africa.

Series of Horses: Aziz is well known among art connoisseurs and critics alike for giving life to wild horses, on canvas. Under his brush and signature techniques, horses become 3-D wonders that literally gallop off the canvas, leaving the viewer mesmerized. Aziz’s horses exude an unmatched equine grace, packed with pulsating energy, raw strength, and fluidity of motion, perhaps tethered only by the length and duration of the viewer’s gaze.

Aziz's paintings frequently feature local Deccani subjects and landmarks, including regional granite rock formations, banyan trees, and Golconda Fort. His work is recognized across Hyderabad and Secunderabad for its depiction of the are'a snatural environment and cultural heritage.

Series of Portraits: Aziz has moved towards a new genre in his repertoire. He has used the three dimensional technique to create “Freedom Walk,” a narrative rendering of a Mahatama Gandhi followed by Nelson Mandela, Jawarharlal Nehru, Indira Gandhi, and the Frontier Gandhi on the Juhu Beach being led by a young child symbolizing the future. It took him a month to create it but he has given it to the Indian High Commissioner to South Africa, HE Shri Virendra Gupta and it will now occupy a premium place in the High Commissioner’s Office in Pretoria. This painting was created to mark “150 years of Indians in South Africa.[1] On 29 December 2010 the idea of making: Freedom Walk a Commemorative Stamp, was shared with the President of India. On 2 October 2011 the Chief Postmaster General of Andhra Pradesh, was requested to work towards making: Freedom Walk a Commemorative Stamp. [2] There is a website especially created for this initiative.“ Abstract Painting Personal life He is married and his wife is an accomplished carpet weaver. He has seven sons, Aqeel and Khaleel are artists, one son is Polo Player the other is a sitar player and is into software, and one is Advertising & Event Management and other 2 are Photographers.

Aziz's Horses Paintings Aziz's Abstract Paintings

== See also ==
- Faux painting
