= 2015 in basketball =

The following are the basketball events of the year 2015 throughout the world.

The following are the basketball events that are expected to take place in 2015 throughout the world. Tournaments include international (FIBA), professional (club) and amateur and collegiate levels.

== National team tournaments ==
=== Summer Olympics qualifying ===
- Teams that qualified to the Olympics are **boldfaced**.

==== Men ====
- AfroBasket 2015 at Tunisia:
  (gold) **Nigeria**
  (silver) Angola
  (bronze) Tunisia
- 2015 FIBA Americas Championship at Mexico:
  (gold) **Venezuela**
  (silver) **Argentina**
  (bronze) Canada
- 2015 FIBA Asia Championship at China:
  (gold) **China**
  (silver) Philippines
  (bronze) Iran
- EuroBasket 2015 at France, Croatia, Latvia and Germany:
  (gold) **Spain**
  (silver) **Lithuania**
  (bronze) France
- 2015 FIBA Oceania Championship at Australia and New Zealand:
  (gold) **Australia**
  (silver) New Zealand

==== Women ====
- AfroBasket Women 2015 at Cameroon:
  (gold) **Senegal**
  (silver) Cameroon
  (bronze) Nigeria
- 2015 FIBA Americas Women's Championship at Canada:
  (gold) **Canada**
  (silver) Cuba
  (bronze) Argentina
- 2015 FIBA Asia Women's Championship at China:
  (gold) **Japan**
  (silver) China
  (bronze) South Korea
- EuroBasket Women 2015 at Hungary and Romania:
  (gold) **Serbia**
  (silver) France
  (bronze) Spain
- 2015 FIBA Oceania Women's Championship at Australia and New Zealand:
  (gold) **Australia**
  (silver) New Zealand

=== Basketball at multi-sport events ===
==== Men ====
- 2015 All-Africa Games in Brazzaville:
  (gold) Angola
  (silver) Egypt
  (bronze) Nigeria
- 2015 European Games in Baku (3x3):
  (gold) Russia
  (silver) Spain
  (bronze) Serbia
- 2015 Games of the Small States of Europe in Iceland:
  (gold) Montenegro
  (silver) Iceland
  (bronze) Luxembourg
- 2015 Island Games in Jersey:
  (gold) Saare County
  (silver) Bermuda
  (bronze) Gibraltar
- 2015 Pacific Games in Port Moresby:
  (gold) Guam
  (silver) Fiji
  (bronze) Tahiti
- 2015 Pan American Games in Toronto:
  (gold) Brazil
  (silver) Canada
  (bronze) United States
- 2015 Southeast Asian Games in Singapore:
  (gold) Philippines
  (silver) Indonesia
  (bronze) Singapore
- 2015 Summer Universiade in Gwangju:
  (gold) United States
  (silver) Germany
  (bronze) Russia

==== Women ====
- 2015 All-Africa Games in Brazzaville:
  (gold) Mali
  (silver) Nigeria
  (bronze) Angola
- 2015 European Games in Baku (3x3):
  (gold) Russia
  (silver) Ukraine
  (bronze) Spain
- 2015 Games of the Small States of Europe in Iceland:
  (gold) Luxembourg
  (silver) Iceland
  (bronze) Malta
- 2015 Island Games in Jersey:
  (gold) Gotland
  (silver) Menorca
  (bronze) Gibraltar
- 2015 Pacific Games in Port Moresby:
  (gold) Fiji
  (silver) American Samoa
  (bronze) Tahiti
- 2015 Pan American Games in Toronto:
  (gold) Canada
  (silver) United States
  (bronze) Cuba
- 2015 Southeast Asian Games in Singapore:
  (gold) Malaysia
  (silver) Indonesia
  (bronze) Thailand
- 2015 Summer Universiade in Gwangju:
  (gold) United States
  (silver) Canada
  (bronze) Russia

=== FIBA World Under-19 Championship ===
==== Men ====
- 2015 FIBA Under-19 World Championship in Greece:
  (gold) United States
  (silver) Croatia
  (bronze) Turkey

==== Women ====
- 2015 FIBA Under-19 World Championship for Women in Russia:
  (gold) United States
  (silver) Russia
  (bronze) Australia

=== FIBA World Under-17 Championship qualifying ===
==== Men ====
- 2015 FIBA Africa Under-16 Championship at Mali:
  (gold) Egypt
  (silver) Mali
  (bronze) Algeria
- 2015 FIBA Americas Under-16 Championship at Argentina:
  (gold) United States
  (silver) Canada
  (bronze) Argentina
- 2015 FIBA Asia Under-16 Championship at Indonesia:
  (gold) South Korea
  (silver) Chinese Taipei
  (bronze) China
- 2015 FIBA Europe Under-16 Championship at Lithuania:
  (gold) Bosnia and Herzegovina
  (silver) Lithuania
  (bronze) Turkey
- 2015 FIBA Oceania Under-16 Championship at New Zealand:
  (gold) Australia
  (silver) New Zealand
  (bronze) Tahiti

==== Women ====
- 2015 FIBA Africa Under-16 Championship for Women at Madagascar:
  (gold) Mali
  (silver) Nigeria
  (bronze) Angola
- 2015 FIBA Americas Under-16 Championship for Women at Mexico:
  (gold) Canada
  (silver) Brazil
  (bronze) United States
- 2015 FIBA Asia Under-16 Championship for Women at Indonesia:
  (gold) China
  (silver) Japan
  (bronze) South Korea
- 2015 FIBA Europe Under-16 Championship for Women at Macedonia:
  (gold) Czech Republic
  (silver) Portugal
  (bronze) Italy
- 2015 FIBA Oceania Under-16 Championship for Women at New Zealand:
  (gold) Australia
  (silver) New Zealand
  (bronze) Tahiti

== Professional club seasons ==
=== FIBA Intercontinental Cup ===
Tournament	Champion	Runner-up	Result	Playoff format
2015 FIBA Intercontinental Cup	(Spain) Real Madrid	(Brazil) Bauru	181–170 (agg.)	Two-legged tie

=== Continental seasons ===
Organizer	Tournament	Champion	Runner-up	Result	Playoff format
FIBA Africa	2015 FIBA Africa Clubs Champions Cup	(Angola) Petro Atlético	(Angola) Rec do Libolo	89–75	One-game playoff
FIBA Africa	2015 FIBA Africa Women's Clubs Champions Cup	(Angola) 1° de Agosto	(Angola) Interclube	69–53	One-game playoff
FIBA Americas	2015 FIBA Americas League	(Brazil) Bauru	(Mexico) Pioneros de Quintana Roo	86–72	One-game playoff
Euroleague Basketball	2014–15 Euroleague	(Spain) Real Madrid	(Greece) Olympiacos	78–59	One-game playoff
Euroleague Basketball	2014–15 EuroCup Basketball	(Russia) Khimki	(Spain) Herbalife Gran Canaria	174–130 (agg.)	Two-legged tie
Euroleague Basketball	2014–15 EuroLeague Women	(Czech Republic) ZVVZ USK Praha	(Russia) Ekaterinburg	72–68	One-game playoff
Euroleague Basketball	2014–15 EuroCup Women	(France) ESB Villeneuve-d'Ascq	(Belgium) Royal Castors Braine	137–121 (agg.)	Two-legged tie
FIBA Europe	2014–15 EuroChallenge	(France) JSF Nanterre	(Turkey) Trabzonspor Medical Park	64–63	One-game playoff

=== Regional seasons ===
==== Men ====
Region	Tournament	Champion	Runner-up	Result	Playoff format
Former Yugoslavia	2014–15 ABA League	(Serbia) Crvena Zvezda Telekom	(Croatia) Cedevita	3–1	Best-of-5 series
Baltic states	2014–15 Baltic Basketball League	(Lithuania) Šiauliai	(Latvia) Ventspils	156–150 (agg.)	Two-legged tie
Balkans	2014–15 BIBL season	(Kosovo) Sigal Prishtina	(Bulgaria) Rilski Sportist	154–143 (agg.)	Two-legged tie
North America	2014–15 NBA season	(United States) Golden State Warriors	(United States) Cleveland Cavaliers	4–2	Best-of-7 series
Australasia	2014–15 NBL season	New Zealand Breakers	(Australia) Cairns Taipans	2–0	Best-of-3 series
Eastern Europe	2014–15 VTB United League	(Russia) CSKA Moscow	(Russia) BC Khimki	3–0	Best-of-5 series
South America	2015 Liga Sudamericana de Básquetbol	(Brazil) Brasilia	(Argentina) San Martín de Corrientes	2–0	Best-of-3 series

==== Women ====
Region	Tournament	Champion	Runner-up	Result	Playoff format
Former Yugoslavia	2014–15 MŽRKL	(Italy) Umana Reyer Venezia	(Serbia) Radivoj Korać	69–52	One-game playoff
Former Yugoslavia	2014–15 WBFAL	(Croatia) Ragusa Dubrovnik	(Montenegro) Lovćen	142–135 (agg.)	Two-legged tie

=== Domestic league seasons ===
==== Men ====
Nation	League	Champion	Runner-up	Result	Playoff format
Albania	2014–15 Albanian Basketball League season	Vllaznia	Tirana	3–0	Best-of-5 series
Angola	2014–15 BIC Basket	Petro Atlético	Rec do Libolo	4–3	Best-of-7 series
Angola	2014–15 Angola Basketball Cup	Rec do Libolo	1º de Agosto	79–70	One-game playoff
Argentina	2014–15 Liga Nacional de Básquet season	Quimsa	Gimnasia Indalo	4–2	Best-of-7 series
Austria	2014–15 Österreichische Basketball Bundesliga	Güssing Knights	Zepter Vienna	3–1	Best-of-5 series
Belgium	2014–15 Belgian Basketball League	Telenet BC Oostende	Belfius Mons-Hainaut	3–1	Best-of-5 series
Belgium	2014–15 Belgian Basketball Cup	Telenet BC Oostende	Liège	95–94 (OT)	One-game playoff
Bosnia and Herzegovina	2014–15 Basketball Championship of Bosnia and Herzegovina	KK Igokea	HKK Široki	3–0	Best-of-5 series
Brazil	2014–15 NBB season	Flamengo	Bauru	2–0	Best-of-3 series
Bulgaria	2014–15 National Basketball League season	Lukoil Academic	Balkan Botevgrad	3–2	Best-of-5 series
Bulgaria	2015 Bulgarian Basketball Cup	Cherno More Varna	Lukoil Academic	72–69	One-game playoff
Canada	2014–15 NBL Canada season	Windsor Express	Halifax Rainmen	4–3	Best-of-7 series
China	2014–15 CBA season	Beijing Ducks	Liaoning Flying Leopards	4–2	Best-of-7 series
Croatia	2014–15 A-1 League	Cedevita	Cibona	3–1	Best-of-5 series
Cyprus	2014–15 Cyprus Basketball Division 1	AEK Larnaca	APOEL	3–1	Best-of-5 series
Czech Republic	2014–15 National Basketball League season	Prostějov	Opava	2–1	Best-of-3 series
Denmark	2014–15 Basketligaen	Horsens IC	Bakken Bears	4–2	Best-of-7 series
Estonia	2014–15 KML season	TÜ/Rock	Kalev/Cramo	4–1	Best-of-7 series
Finland	2014–15 Korisliiga season	Kataja	Bisons Loimaa	3–2	Best-of-5 series
France	2014–15 LNB Pro A season	Limoges	Strasbourg	3–1	Best-of-5 series
France	2014–15 French Basketball Cup	Strasbourg IG	ESSM Le Portel	87–74	One-game playoff
France	2015 Leaders Cup	Strasbourg IG	Le Mans Sarthe	60–58	One-game playoff
Germany	2014–15 Basketball Bundesliga	Brose Baskets	Bayern Munich	3–2	Best-of-5 series
Germany	2015 BBL-Pokal	EWE Baskets Oldenburg	Brose Baskets	72–70	One-game playoff
Great Britain	2014–15 British Basketball League season	Newcastle Eagles	London Lions	96–84	One-game playoff
Greece	2014–15 Greek Basket League	Olympiacos	Panathinaikos	3–0	Best-of-5 series
Greece	2014–15 Greek Basketball Cup	Panathinaikos	Apollon Patras	68–53	One-game playoff
Hungary	2014–15 Nemzeti Bajnokság I/A	Szolnoki Olaj KK	KTE-Duna Aszfalt	2–0	Best-of-3 series
Israel	2014–15 Israeli Basketball Super League	Hapoel Jerusalem	Hapoel Eilat	168–133 (agg.)	Two-legged tie
Israel	Israeli Basketball State Cup 2014–15	Maccabi Tel Aviv	Hapoel Jerusalem	94–76	One-game playoff
Italy	2014–15 Lega Basket Serie A	Banco di Sardegna Sassari	Grissin Bon Reggio Emilia	4–3	Best-of-7 series
Italy	2015 Italian Basketball Cup	Dinamo Sassari	EA7 Milano	101–94	One-game playoff
Kazakhstan	2014–15 Kazakhstan Basketball Championship	BC Astana	Almatynski Legion	81–56	One-game playoff
Kazakhstan	2015 Kazakhstan Basketball Cup	Almaty Legion	Tobol Kostanay	90–86	One-game playoff
Kosovo	2014–15 Kosovo Basketball Superleague	Sigal Prishtina	Peja	3–0	Best-of-5 series
Latvia	2014–15 Latvian Basketball League	VEF Rīga	BK Ventspils	4–2	Best-of-7 series
Lithuania	2014–15 LKL season	Žalgiris	Lietuvos rytas	4–1	Best-of-7 series
Lithuania	2015 LKF Cup	Žalgiris	Lietuvos rytas	82–76	One-game playoff
Netherlands	2014–15 Dutch Basketball League	SPM Shoeters Den Bosch	Donar	4–1	Best-of-7 series
Netherlands	2014–15 NBB Cup	Donar	SPM Shoeters	78–70	One-game playoff
New Zealand	2015 New Zealand NBL season	Southland Sharks	Wellington Saints	72–68	One-game playoff
Philippines	2014–15 PBA Philippine Cup	San Miguel Beermen	Alaska Aces	4–3	Best-of-7 series
Philippines	2015 PBA Commissioner's Cup	Talk 'N Text Tropang Texters	Rain or Shine Elasto Painters	4–3	Best-of-7 series
Philippines	2015 PBA Governors' Cup	San Miguel Beermen	Alaska Aces	4–0	Best-of-7 series
Poland	2014–15 PLK season	Stelmet Zielona Góra	PGE Turów Zgorzelec	4–2	Best-of-7 series
Poland	2015 Polish Basketball Cup	Stelmet Zielona Góra	Rosa Radom	77–71	One-game playoff
Portugal	2014–15 LPB season	Benfica	Vitória Guimarães	3–0	Best-of-5 series
Romania	2014–15 Liga Națională	Asesoft Ploiești	BC Mureș	3–0	Best-of-5 series
Russia	2014–15 Russian Basketball Cup	Novosibirsk	Dynamo Moscow	81–78	One-game playoff
Serbia	2014–15 Basketball League of Serbia	Crvena Zvezda Telekom	Partizan NIS	3–0	Best-of-5 series
Serbia	2014–15 Radivoj Korać Cup	Crvena Zvezda Telekom	Mega Leks	80–74	One-game playoff
Slovenia	2014–15 Slovenian Basketball League	Tajfun	Rogaška	3–1	Best-of-5 series
Spain	2014–15 ACB season	Real Madrid	FC Barcelona	3–0	Best-of-5 series
Spain	2015 Copa del Rey de Baloncesto	Real Madrid	FC Barcelona	77–71	One-game playoff
Sweden	2014–15 Basketligan season	Södertälje Kings	Uppsala	4–1	Best-of-7 series
Switzerland	2014–15 LNBA season	Lions Genève	Union Neuchâtel	4–1	Best-of-7 series
Tunisia	2014–15 Tunisian Men's Basketball League	Club Africain	Étoile Sportive de Radès	2–0	Best-of-3 series
Turkey	2014–15 Turkish Basketball League	Pınar Karşıyaka	Trabzonspor Medical Park	3–2	Best-of-5 series
Turkey	2014–15 Turkish Cup Basketball	Anadolu Efes	Fenerbahçe Ülker	70–60	One-game playoff
Ukraine	2014–15 Ukrainian Basketball SuperLeague	Khimik	Dnipro	3–0	Best-of-5 series

==== Women ====
Nation	League	Champion	Runner-up	Result	Playoff format
Australia	2014–15 WNBL season	Townsville Fire	Bendigo Spirit	75–65	One-game playoff
Hungary	2014–15 Nemzeti Bajnokság I/A	UNIQA-Euroleasing Sopron	Ceglédi EKK	3–1	Best-of-5 series
Iceland	2014–15 Úrvalsdeild kvenna	Snæfell	Keflavík	3–0	Best-of-5 series
Iceland	2014–15 Icelandic Women's Basketball Cup	Grindavík	Keflavík	68–61	One-game playoff
Serbia	2014–15 First Women's Basketball League of Serbia	Radivoj Korać	Vojvodina	3–1	Best-of-5 series
Spain	2014–15 Liga Femenina de Baloncesto	Spar Citylift Girona	Perfumerías Avenida	2–0	Best-of-3 series
Turkey	2014–15 Turkish Women's Basketball League	Galatasaray OdeaBank	Abdullah Gül Üniversitesi	3–1	Best-of-5 series
United States	2015 WNBA season	Minnesota Lynx	Indiana Fever	3–2	Best-of-5 series

== College seasons ==
=== Men ===
Nation	League / Tournament	Champions	Runners-up	Result	Playoff format
Canada	2015 CIS Basketball Championship	Carleton Ravens	Ottawa Gee-Gees	93–46	One-game playoff
Philippines	NCAA Season 91 basketball tournaments	Letran Knights	San Beda Red Lions	2–1	Best-of-3 series
Philippines	UAAP Season 78 basketball tournaments	FEU Tamaraws	UST Growling Tigers	2–1	Best-of-3 series
United States	2015 NCAA Division I men's basketball tournament	Duke Blue Devils	Wisconsin Badgers	68–63	One-game playoff
United States	2015 National Invitation Tournament	Stanford Cardinal	Miami Hurricanes	66–64 (OT)	One-game playoff
United States	2015 NCAA Division II men's basketball tournament	Florida Southern	Indiana (PA)	77–62	One-game playoff
United States	2015 NCAA Division III men's basketball tournament	Wisconsin–Stevens Point	Augustana (IL)	70–54	One-game playoff
United States	2015 NAIA Division I men's basketball tournament	Dalton State	Westmont	71–53	One-game playoff
United States	2015 NAIA Division II men's basketball tournament	Cornerstone	Dakota Wesleyan	66–45	One-game playoff

=== Women ===
Nation	League / Tournament	Champions	Runners-up	Result	Playoff format
Canada	2015 CIS Basketball Championship	Windsor	McGill	60–47	One-game playoff
United States	2015 NCAA Division I basketball tournament	Connecticut Huskies	Notre Dame Fighting Irish	63–53	One-game playoff
United States	2015 National Invitation Tournament	UCLA Bruins	West Virginia Mountaineers	62–60	One-game playoff
United States	2015 NCAA Division II basketball tournament	California (PA)	California Baptist	86–69	One-game playoff
United States	2015 NCAA Division II basketball tournament	Thomas More	George Fox	83–63	One-game playoff
United States	2015 NAIA Division I women's basketball tournament	Oklahoma City	Campbellsville	80–63	One-game playoff
United States	2015 NAIA Division II women's basketball tournament	Morningside	Concordia (NE)	59–57	One-game playoff

== Notable events ==
- January 25 – Duke coach Mike Krzyzewski becomes the first NCAA Division I men's coach with 1,000 career wins, following the Blue Devils' 77–68 win over St. John's at Madison Square Garden.
- February 3
  - Connecticut women's coach Geno Auriemma becomes the fastest coach to 900 wins in college basketball history at any level, following the Huskies' 96–36 home blowout of Cincinnati. Auriemma reached 900 wins in 1,034 games; the previous record was 1,072 by Pat Summitt, while the record in men's basketball is 1,183 games by Krzyzewski. Auriemma also becomes the first man ever to reach the 900-win mark in NCAA women's basketball; the previous six coaches to do so are all women.
  - WNBA star Diana Taurasi announces that she will sit out the 2015 season at the behest of her Russian club, UMMC Ekaterinburg. The club, which already has her under contract for about US$1.5 million a season, is reportedly paying her more than the WNBA maximum salary of $107,000 as a bonus to skip the WNBA season.
- February 7 – Herb Magee, coach at NCAA Division II Philadelphia University since 1967, becomes the second NCAA men's coach with 1,000 career wins following the Rams' 80–60 win over Post.

== Awards and honors ==
=== Naismith Memorial Basketball Hall of Fame ===
- Players: Louie Dampier, Spencer Haywood, John Isaacs, Lisa Leslie, Dikembe Mutombo, Jo Jo White
- Coaches: John Calipari, Lindsay Gaze, Tom Heinsohn
- Referees: Dick Bavetta
- Contributors: George Raveling

=== Women's Basketball Hall of Fame ===
- Lisa Leslie
- Janeth Arcain
- Janet Harris
- Gail Goestenkors (coach)
- Brad Smith (coach)
- Kurt Budke (coach)

=== FIBA Hall of Fame ===
- Players: Anne Donovan, Michael Jordan, Ruperto Herrera Tabio, Šarūnas Marčiulionis, Antoine Rigaudeau, Vladimir Tkachenko
- Coaches: Jan Stirling
- Officials: Robert Blanchard
- Contributors: Noah Klieger

== Deaths ==
- January 4 — Jack Parr, American NBA player (Cincinnati Royals) (born 1936)
- January 4 — Stuart Scott, American NBA television studio host (born 1965)
- January 9 — Ah Chew Goo, American college coach (Hawaii) (born 1918)
- January 9 — Roy Tarpley, American NBA player (Dallas Mavericks) (born 1964)
- January 14 — Bob Boyd, American college coach (Seattle, USC, Mississippi State) (born 1930)
- January 16 — Ray Lumpp, American NBA player (New York Knicks) and Olympic champion (born 1923)
- January 17 — Roderick McDonald, American ABA player (Utah Stars) (born 1945)
- January 18 — Milt Schoon, American NBL player (Sheboygan Red Skins) (born 1922)
- January 27 — Bob Shea, American BAA player (Providence Steamrollers) (born 1924)
- January 30 — Carl Boldt, American college player (San Francisco) who won an NCAA national championship in 1955–56 (born 1932)
- January 30 — Ben Schadler, American BAA/NBL player (born 1924)
- February 1 — Ron Johnson, American NBA player (Detroit Pistons, Los Angeles Lakers) (born 1938)
- February 5 — Don Suman, American college coach (Rice) (born 1920)
- February 6 — Norm Drucker, American NBA and ABA official (born 1920)
- February 7 — Dean Smith, American Hall of Fame college coach (North Carolina) (born 1931)
- February 9 — Ken Cunningham, American college coach (Akron) (born 1943)
- February 10 — Wayne Dobbs, American college coach (Belmont, Vanderbilt) (born 1939)
- February 11 — Jerry Tarkanian, American Hall of Fame college and NBA coach (Long Beach State, UNLV, San Antonio Spurs, Fresno State) (born 1930)
- February 15 — Terry Truax, American college coach (Towson) (born 1945)
- February 18 — Jerome Kersey, American NBA player (Portland Trail Blazers and others) (born 1962)
- February 20 — Dick Triptow, American NBA player (born 1922)
- February 26 — Earl Lloyd, American NBA player and coach, first African-American to play in the NBA, Hall of Fame member as a contributor (born 1928)
- February 28 — Anthony Mason, American NBA player (born 1966)
- March 1 — Guram Minashvili, Georgian Olympic silver medalist (1960) (born 1935)
- March 1 — Chris Welp, German NBA and Euroleague player (born 1964)
- March 4 — Stacey Arceneaux, American NBA player (St. Louis Hawks) (born 1936)
- March 6 — Enrique "Coco" Vicéns, Puerto Rican player (born 1926)
- March 16 — Chet Giermak, All-American college player (William & Mary) (born 1928)
- March 16 — Jack Haley, American NBA player (born 1964)
- March 21 — Warren Womble, American AAU and Olympic coach (1952) (born 1920)
- March 23 — Bobby Lowther, American NBL player (Tri-Cities Blackhawks, Waterloo Hawks) (born 1923)
- March 25 — Loy Young, American college coach (Chadron State) (born 1923)
- March 27 — Hot Rod Hundley, American NBA player (Los Angeles Lakers) and announcer (born 1934)
- April 7 — Torrey Ward, American player and coach (born 1978)
- April 10 — Lauren Hill, American college basketball player and pediatric cancer advocate who died of brain cancer during her freshman season at Mount St. Joseph (born 1995)
- April 11 — Charlie Beasley, American ABA player (Dallas Chaparrals, Miami Floridians) (born 1945)
- April 13 — Gerald Calabrese, American NBA player (Syracuse Nationals) (born 1925)
- April 25 — Mike Phillips, American Liga ACB player (FC Barcelona) and college national champion (1978 Kentucky) (born 1956)
- May 10 — Davey Whitney, American Hall of Fame college coach (Texas Southern, Alcorn State) (born 1930)
- May 11 — Bob Light, American college coach (Appalachian State) (born 1927)
- May 12 — Bill Guthridge, American college coach (North Carolina) (born 1937)
- May 15 — Bob Hopkins, American NBA player (Syracuse Nationals) and coach (Seattle SuperSonics) (born 1934)
- May 22 — Marques Haynes, American Hall of Fame Harlem Globetrotters player (born 1926)
- May 23 — Boody Gilbertson, American NBL player (Sheboygan Red Skins) (born 1922)
- May 23 — Andres Ortiz, Puerto Rican player (Indios de Mayagüez)
- May 26 — Walter Byers, Executive Director of the NCAA, College Basketball Hall of Fame inductee (born 1922)
- May 27 — Vittorio Paolo Fiorito, Italian referee (born 1941)
- May 27 — Bill Foster, American college coach (Miami, Virginia Tech, Clemson) (born 1936)
- June 3 — Bevo Francis, American college player (Rio Grande College) (born 1932)
- June 14 — Bob Bedell, American ABA player (Anaheim Amigos, Dallas Chaparrals) (born 1944)
- June 23 — Harvey Pollack, Director of Statistical Information for the Philadelphia 76ers (born 1922)
- June 29 — Jackson Vroman, American-born Lebanese NBA player (Phoenix Suns, New Orleans Hornets) (born 1981)
- July 20 — George Bon Salle, American NBA player (Chicago Packers) (born 1935)
- July 25 — Bob Kauffman, American NBA player (born 1946)
- July 30 — John Weinert, American college coach (Bowling Green) (born 1931)
- August 3 — Frank Kerns, American college coach (Georgia Southern) (born 1933)
- August 4 — John Rudometkin, American NBA player (New York Knicks, San Francisco Warriors) (born 1940)
- August 10 — Cleo Hill, American NBA player (St. Louis Hawks) (born 1938)
- August 22 — Lou Tsioropoulos, American NBA player (Boston Celtics) (born 1930)
- August 24 — Bevo Nordmann, American NBA player (Cincinnati Royals, St. Louis Hawks, New York Knicks) (born 1939)
- August 27 — Darryl Dawkins, American NBA player (Philadelphia 76ers, New Jersey Nets) (born 1957)
- September 11 — Roy Marble, American NBA player (Atlanta Hawks, Denver Nuggets) (born 1966)
- September 13 — Moses Malone, American Hall of Fame ABA and NBA player (born 1955)
- September 21 — Ivan Dvorny, Russian/Soviet Olympic Gold medalist (1972) (born 1952)
- September 25 — Bill Bridges, American NBA player (Atlanta Hawks, Golden State Warriors) (born 1939)
- September 25 — Tommie Green, American NBA player (New Orleans Jazz) and college coach (Southern) (born 1956)
- October 4 — Neal Walk, American NBA player (Phoenix Suns, New Orleans Jazz, New York Knicks) (born 1948)
- October 7 — Harry Gallatin, American Hall of Fame NBA player and coach (born 1927)
- October 9 — Dave Meyers, American NBA player (Milwaukee Bucks) and college All-American (UCLA) (born 1953)
- October 15 — Nate Huffman, American NBA (Toronto Raptors) and Euroleague (Maccabi Tel Aviv) player (born 1975)
- October 18 — Tommy O'Keefe, American NBA player (Washington Capitols, Baltimore Bullets) (born 1928)
- October 19 — D. C. Wilcutt, American NBA player (St. Louis Bombers) (born 1923)
- October 20 — Makis Dendrinos, Greek player (Panionios) and coach (born 1950)
- October 25 — Flip Saunders, American NBA coach (Minnesota Timberwolves, Detroit Pistons, Washington Wizards) (born 1955)
- October 26 — Zeke Hogeland, American college coach (Bemidji State, Northern Iowa) (born 1925)
- October 29 — Luther Burden, American ABA and NBA player (Virginia Squires, New York Knicks) (born 1953)
- October 29 — Boris Kristančič, Slovenian/Yugoslav Olympic player (born 1932)
- October 29 — Ranko Žeravica, Serbian coach (Partizan) (born 1929)
- October 30 — Mel Daniels, American Hall of Fame ABA player (Indiana Pacers) (born 1944)
- November 10 — Michael Wright, American-born Turkish player (born 1980)
- November 11 — Scotty Stirling, American ABA and NBA executive
- November 14 — Norm Ellenberger, American college coach (New Mexico)
- November 26 — Guy Lewis, American Hall of Fame college coach (Houston Cougars) (born 1922)
- November 26 — Bill Stauffer, American college player (Missouri Tigers) (born 1930)
- December 1 — Jim Loscutoff, American NBA player (Boston Celtics) (born 1930)
- December 5 — Dave Scholz, American NBA player (Philadelphia 76ers) (born 1948)
- December 10 — Dolph Schayes, American Hall of Fame NBA player (Syracuse Nationals) (born 1928)
- December 11 — John "Hot Rod" Williams, American NBA player (Cleveland Cavaliers, Phoenix Suns, Dallas Mavericks) (born 1962)
- December 16 — John Bates, American college coach (Maryland Eastern Shore, Coppin State) (born 1938)
- December 21 — Lim Eng Beng, Filipino basketball player (born 1951)
- December 23 — Chen Luyun, Chinese basketball player (born 1977)
- December 24 — Ron Jacobs, American college (Loyola Marymount) and professional (Northern Cement) coach (born 1942)
- December 26 — Mac Otten, American NBA player (Tri-Cities Blackhawks, St. Louis Bombers) (born 1925)
- December 27 — Meadowlark Lemon, American Hall of Fame player (Harlem Globetrotters) (born 1932)
- December 28 — Dave Campbell, Canadian Olympic player (1948) (born 1925)

== See also ==
- Timeline of women's basketball
