= 2016 Kazakhstan Basketball Cup =

Kazakhstan Basketball Cup
- Season: 2016
- Duration: 7 – 11 March 2016
- Games played: 8
- Teams: 4 (4 in the final four)

Finals
- Champions: Almaty Legion; 2nd title
- Runners-up: PBC Kapchagay
- Semi-finalists: Barsy Atyrau; Tobol Kostanay

Records
- Highest scoring: Almaty Legion 105-85 Tobol Kostanay
- Highest attendance: 4 matches on 350 spectators
- Lowest attendance: 2 matches without spectators
- Average attendance: 243 spectators

The 2016 Kazakhstan Basketball Cup (Kazakh: 2016 маусымдағы баскетболдан Қазақстан Кубогы; Russian: Кубок Казахстана по баскетболу сезон 2016) was the 14th edition of the Kazakhstan Basketball Cup, the highest professional cup basketball competition in Kazakhstan.

== Group stage ==
Team	Pld	W	L	GF	GA	GD	Pts
PBC Kapchagay	3	3	0	250	230	+20	6
Almaty Legion	3	2	1	265	244	+21	5
Tobol Kostanay	3	1	2	245	256	−11	4
Barsy Atyrau	3	0	3	234	264	−30	3

7 March
18:00

Boxscore

PBC Kapchagay 89, Barsy Atyrau 85
Scoring by quarter: 25–18, 11–24, 24–22, 39–21
Pts: Konstantin Dvirnyi 25	Pts: Mikhail Evstigneev 22

Sport Complex Dostyk, Almaty
Attendance: 300
Referees: Matevos Nikogosyan, Arsen Andryushkin, Arnur Serikuly

7 March
20:00

Boxscore

Almaty Legion 105, Tobol Kostanay 85
Scoring by quarter: 26–20, 30–26, 24–18, 25–21
Pts: Yuri Kozhanov 28	Pts: Shaim Kuanov 22

Sport Complex Dostyk, Almaty
Attendance: 0
Referees: Matevos Nikogosyan, Alexey Stepanenko, Arnur Serikuly

8 March
18:00

Boxscore

PBC Kapchagay 71, Tobol Kostanay 64
Scoring by quarter: 5–13, 20–14, 29–20, 17–17
Pts: Anton Bykov 19	Pts: Shaim Kuanov 25

Sport Complex Dostyk, Almaty
Attendance: 350
Referees: Arsen Andryushkin, Alexey Stepanenko, Arnur Serikuly

8 March
20:00

Boxscore

Almaty Legion 79, Barsy Atyrau 69
Scoring by quarter: 21–9, 16–17, 23–23, 19–20
Pts: Yuri Kozhanov 20	Pts: Dmitri Klimov 22

Sport Complex Dostyk, Almaty
Attendance: 350
Referees: Matevos Nikogosyan, Alexey Stepanenko, Arsen Andryushkin

9 March
18:00

Boxscore

Tobol Kostanay 96, Barsy Atyrau 80
Scoring by quarter: 23–21, 18–19, 22–16, 33–24
Pts: Nikolai Bazhin 28	Pts: Dmitri Gavrilov 20

Sport Complex Dostyk, Almaty
Attendance: 350
Referees: Matevos Nikogosyan, Alexey Stepanenko, Arnur Serikuly

9 March
20:00

Boxscore

PBC Kapchagay 90, Almaty Legion 81
Scoring by quarter: 24–19, 17–17, 25–22, 24–23
Pts: Konstantin Marzan 15	Pts: Aleksandr Danilchenko 22

Sport Complex Dostyk, Almaty
Attendance: 250
Referees: Arsen Andryushkin, Alexey Stepanenko, Arnur Serikuly

== Third place game ==
11 March
17:30

Boxscore

Tobol Kostanay 51, Barsy Atyrau 83
Scoring by quarter: 13–22, 12–20, 9–26, 17–15
Pts: Leonid Adamovich; Mikhail Shvab 12	Pts: Dmitri Gavrilov 20

Sport Complex Dostyk, Almaty
Attendance: 0
Referees: Alexey Stepanenko, Arsen Andryushkin, Arnur Serikuly

== Final ==
11 March
19:30

Boxscore

PBC Kapchagay 87, Almaty Legion 89
Scoring by quarter: 17–16, 19–22, 22–23, 23–20
Pts: Anton Bykov 20	Pts: Yuri Kozhanov 25

Sport Complex Dostyk, Almaty
Attendance: 350
Referees: Matevos Nikogosyan, Arsen Andryushkin, Alexey Stepanenko
