= 2016 in basketball =

List of basketball events in 2016

The following are the basketball events of the year 2016 throughout the world.

The following are the basketball events that are expected to take place in 2016 throughout the world.

Tournaments include international (FIBA), professional (club) and amateur and collegiate levels.

== National team tournaments ==
- June 13–19 - The 2016 FIBA World Olympic Qualifying Tournament for Women was staged at the city of Nantes in France.

The 5 teams below clinched a spot for the 2016 Olympic Basketball Games.

Rankings	Team
1st place, gold medalist(s)	Spain
2nd place, silver medalist(s)	Turkey
3rd place, bronze medalist(s)	France
4th	China
5th	Belarus

- July 4–10 - The 2016 FIBA World Olympic Qualifying Tournaments for Men was staged at Serbia, Italy and in the Philippines.

The 3 teams here below clinched a spot for the 2016 Olympic Basketball Games.

OQT Tournament	Winners
Serbia	Serbia
Philippines	France
Italy	Croatia

=== 2016 Summer Olympics Basketball Tournament ===
==== Men ====
- (gold) United States
- (silver) Serbia
- (bronze) Spain

==== Women ====
- (gold) United States
- (silver) Spain
- (bronze) Serbia

=== FIBA World Under-17 Championships ===
==== Men ====
- 2016 FIBA Under-17 World Championship in Spain:
  (gold) United States
  (silver) Turkey
  (bronze) Lithuania

==== Women ====
- 2016 FIBA Under-17 World Championship for Women in Spain:
  (gold) Australia
  (silver) Italy
  (bronze) United States

=== FIBA World Under-19 Championship qualifying ===
==== Men ====
- 2016 FIBA Africa Under-18 Championship:
  (gold) Angola
  (silver) Egypt
  (bronze) Mali
- 2016 FIBA Americas Under-18 Championship:
  (gold) United States
  (silver) Canada
  (bronze) Brazil
- 2016 FIBA Asia Under-18 Championship:
  (gold) Iran
  (silver) Japan
  (bronze) South Korea
- 2016 FIBA Europe Under-18 Championship:
  (gold) France
  (silver) Lithuania
  (bronze) Italy
- 2016 FIBA Oceania Under-18 Championship:
  (gold) New Zealand
  (silver) Australia
  (bronze) Guam

==== Women ====
- 2016 FIBA Africa Under-18 Championship for Women:
  (gold) Mali
  (silver) Egypt
  (bronze) Mozambique
- 2016 FIBA Americas Under-18 Championship for Women:
  (gold) United States
  (silver) Canada
  (bronze) Brazil
- 2016 FIBA Asia Under-18 Championship for Women:
  (gold) China
  (silver) Japan
  (bronze) South Korea
- 2016 FIBA Europe Under-18 Championship for Women:
  (gold) France
  (silver) Spain
  (bronze) Russia
- 2016 FIBA Oceania Under-18 Championship for Women:
  (gold) Australia
  (silver) New Zealand
  (bronze) Samoa

=== World Championships ===
==== Men ====
- (gold) Serbia
  (silver) United States
  (bronze) Slovenia

==== Women ====
- (gold) Czech Republic
  (silver) Ukraine
  (bronze) United States

=== FIBA Americas ===
==== Men ====
- 2016 Centrobasket in Panama:
  (gold) Puerto Rico
  (silver) Mexico
  (bronze) Dominican Republic

=== FIBA Asia ===
- 2016 FIBA Asia Challenge in Iran:
  (gold) Iran
  (silver) South Korea
  (bronze) Jordan
- 2016 FIBA Asia Champions Cup in China:
  (gold) China Kashgar
  (silver) (Lebanon) Al-Riyadi
  (bronze) (Iran) Petrochimi
- 2016 FIBA 3x3 Under-18 Asian Championships in Malaysia:
  (gold) Qatar
  (silver) Philippines
  (bronze) Malaysia

== Professional club seasons ==
=== FIBA Intercontinental Cup ===
Tournament	Champion	Runner-up	Result	Playoff format
2016 FIBA Intercontinental Cup	(Venezuela) Guaros de Lara	(Germany) Fraport Skyliners	74–69	One-game playoff

=== Continental seasons ===
==== Men ====
Organizer	Tournament	Champion	Runner-up	Result	Playoff format
Euroleague Basketball	2015–16 Eurocup Basketball	(Turkey) Galatasaray S.K.	(France) Strasbourg	140–133 (agg)	Two-legged tie
Euroleague Basketball	2015–16 Euroleague	(Russia) CSKA Moscow	(Turkey) Fenerbahçe	101–96	One-game playoff
FIBA Africa	2016 FIBA Africa Clubs Champions Cup	(Egypt) Al Ahly	(Angola) C.R.D. Libolo	68–66	One-game playoff
FIBA Americas	2016 FIBA Americas League	(Venezuela) Guaros de Lara	(Brazil) Bauru	84–79	One-game playoff
FIBA Asia	2016 FIBA Asia Champions Cup	China Kashgar	(Lebanon) Al-Riyadi	96–88	One-game playoff
FIBA Europe	2015–16 FIBA Europe Cup	(Germany) Fraport Skyliners	(Italy) Openjobmetis Varese	66–82	One-game playoff

=== Transnational seasons ===
==== Men ====
Region	Tournament	Champion	Runner-up	Result	Playoff format
Former Yugoslavia	2015–16 ABA League	(Serbia) KK Crvena zvezda	(Serbia) KK Mega Basket	3–0	Best-of-5 series
Southeast Asia	2015–16 ABL season	Westports Malaysia Dragons	Singapore Slingers	3–2	Best-of-5 series
Baltic States	2015–16 Baltic Basketball League	(Lithuania) BC Šiauliai	(Estonia) TU/Rock	176–157 (agg)	Two-legged tie
Balkans	2015–16 BIBL season	(Kosovo) Sigal Prishtina	(Montenegro) Mornar	150–143 (agg)	Two-legged tie
Northern America	2015–16 NBA season	(United States) Cleveland Cavaliers	(United States) Golden State Warriors	4–3	Best-of-7 series
Australasia	2015–16 NBL season	(Australia) Perth Wildcats	New Zealand Breakers	2–1	Best-of-3 series
Eastern Europe	2015–16 VTB United League	(Russia) CSKA Moscow	(Russia) UNICS	3–1	Best-of-5 series

=== Domestic league seasons ===
==== Men ====
Nation	League	Champion	Runner-up	Result	Playoff format
Albania	2015–16 Albanian Basketball League	BC Vllaznia	BC Teuta Durrës	3–1	Best-of-5 series
Angola	2015–16 BIC Basket	1º de Agosto	C.R.D. Libolo	4–1	Best-of-7 series
Argentina	2015–16 Liga Nacional de Basquet season	San Lorenzo	La Unión	4–0	Best-of-7 series
Austria	2015–16 Österreichische Basketball Bundesliga	Oberwart Gunners	WBC Wels	3–0	Best-of-5 series
Belgium	2015–16 Belgian Basketball League	Telenet Oostende	Crelan Okapi Aalstar	3–1	Best-of-5 series
Belgium	2015–16 Belgian Basketball Cup	Telenet Oostende	Antwerp Giants	74–52	One-game playoff
Bosnia and Herzegovina	2015–16 Basketball Championship of Bosnia and Herzegovina	KK Igokea	KK Kakanj	3–1	Best-of-5 series
Bulgaria	2015–16 National Basketball League	Lukoil Academic	BC Balkan Botevgrad	3–0	Best-of-5 series
Bulgaria	2016 Bulgarian Basketball Cup	Rilski Sportist	Lukoil Academic	90–80	One-game playoff
Canada	2015–16 NBL Canada season	Halifax Hurricanes	London Lightning	4–3	Best-of-7 series
China	2015–16 CBA season	Sichuan Blue Whales	Liaoning Flying Leopards	4–1	Best-of-7 series
Croatia	2015–16 A-1 League	KK Cedevita	KK Cibona	3–0	Best-of-5 series
Cyprus	2015–16 Cyprus Basketball Division A	AEK Larnaca B.C.	APOEL B.C.	3–0	Best-of-5 series
Czech Republic	2015–16 National Basketball League	Basketball Nymburk	BK Děčín	3–0	Best-of-5 series
Denmark	2015–16 Basketligaen	Horsens IC	Bakken Bears	4–3	Best-of-7 series
Estonia	2015–16 KML season	BC Kalev/Cramo	TU/Rock	4–1	Best-of-7 series
Finland	2015–16 Korisliiga season	Kouvot	Tampereen Pyrintö	4–1	Best-of-7 series
France	2015–16 Pro A season	ASVEL	Strasbourg	3–2	Best-of-5 series
France	2015–16 French Basketball Cup	Le Mans Sarthe	ASVEL	88–75	One-game playoff
France	2016 Leaders Cup	AS Monaco	Élan Chalon	99–74	One-game playoff
Germany	2015–16 Basketball Bundesliga	Brose Baskets	ratiopharm Ulm	3–0	Best-of-5 series
Germany	2016 BBL-Pokal	Alba Berlin	Bayern Munich	67–65	One-game playoff
Great Britain	2015–16 British Basketball League season	Sheffield Sharks	Leicester Riders	84–77	One-game playoff
Greece	2015–16 Greek Basket League	Olympiakos	Panathinaikos	3–1	Best-of-5 series
Greece	2015–16 Greek Basketball Cup	Panathinaikos	Faros Keratsiniou	101–54	One-game playoff
Hungary	2015–16 Nemzeti Bajnokság I/A	Szolnoki Olaj KK	TLI-Alba Fehérvár	3–1	Best-of-5 series
Hungary	2016 Magyar Kupa	Egis Körmend	Szolnoki Olaj KK	68–55	One-game playoff
Iceland	2015–16 Úrvalsdeild karla	KR	Haukar	3–1	Best-of-5 series
India	2016 UBA Pro Basketball League season	Delhi Capitals	Chennai Slam	2–1	Best-of-3 series
Indonesia	2016 IBL Indonesia	CLS Knights Surabaya	Pelita Jaya Energi Mega Persada	2–1	Best-of-3 series
Ireland	2015–16 Irish Premier League season	UCC Demons	Killester Basketball Club	82–77	One-game playoff
Israel	2015–16 Israeli Basketball Super League	Maccabi Rishon LeZion	Hapoel Jerusalem B.C.	83–77	One-game playoff
Israel	2016 Israeli Basketball State Cup	Maccabi Tel Aviv	Maccabi Ashdod	83–75	One-game playoff
Italy	2015–16 Lega Basket Serie A	EA7 Emporio Armani Milano	Grissin Bon Reggio Emilia	4–2	Best-of-7 series
Italy	2016 Italian Basketball Cup	EA7 Emporio Armani Milano	Sidigas Avellino	82–76	One-game playoff
Kazakhstan	2015–16 Kazakhstan Basketball Championship	BC Barsy Atyrau	BC Astana	3–0	Best-of-5 series
Kazakhstan	2016 Kazakhstan Basketball Cup	Almaty Legion	PBC Kapchagay	89–87	One-game playoff
Kosovo	2015–16 Kosovo Basketball Superleague	Sigal Prishtina	KB Peja	3–2	Best-of-5 series
Latvia	2015–16 Latvian Basketball League	Valmiera/ORDO	BK VEF Rīga	4–3	Best-of-7 series
Lithuania	2015–16 LKL season	BC Žalgiris	BC Neptūnas	4–1	Best-of-7 series
Lithuania	2016 Karaliaus Mindaugo taurė	Lietuvos rytas Vilnius	BC Žalgiris	67–57	
North Macedonia	2015–16 Macedonian First League	MZT Aerodrom	Kumanovo 2009	3–1	Best-of-5 series
Montenegro	2015–16 Prva A liga	Budućnost Voli	KK Mornar Bar	3–1	Best-of-5 series
Netherlands	2015–16 Dutch Basketball League	Donar	Landstede Basketbal	4–1	Best-of-7 series
Netherlands	2015–16 NBB Cup	SPM Shoeters Den Bosch	Zorg en Zekerheid Leiden	58–57	One-game playoff
New Zealand	2016 New Zealand NBL season	Wellington Saints	Super City Rangers	94–82	One-game playoff
Philippines	2015–16 PBA Philippine Cup	San Miguel Beermen	Alaska Aces	4–3	Best-of-7 series
Philippines	2016 PBA Commissioner's Cup	Rain or Shine Elasto Painters	Alaska Aces	4–2	Best-of-7 series
Philippines	2016 PBA Governors' Cup	Barangay Ginebra San Miguel	Meralco Bolts	4–2	Best-of-7 series
Philippines	2016 PBA D-League Aspirant's Cup	Phoenix Accelerators-FEU	Cafe France Bakers-CEU	3–2	Best-of-5 series
Puerto Rico	2016 Baloncesto Superior Nacional	Capitanes de Arecibo	Vaqueros de Bayamón	4–2	Best-of-7 series
Poland	2015–16 PLK season	Stelmet Zielona Góra	Rosa Radom	4–0	Best-of-7 series
Portugal	2015–16 LPB season	Porto	Benfica	3–1	Best-of-5 series
Romania	2015–16 Liga Națională	CSM Oradea	BC Mureș	3–2	Best-of-5 series
Serbia	2015–16 Basketball League of Serbia	Crvena zvezda	Partizan	3–1	Best-of-5 series
Serbia	2015–16 Radivoj Korać Cup	Mega Leks	Partizan	85–80	One-game playoff
Slovenia	2015–16 Slovenian Basketball League	Helios Suns	Zlatorog Laško	3–1	Best-of-5 series
Spain	2015–16 ACB season	Real Madrid	FC Barcelona Lassa	3–1	Best-of-5 series
Spain	2016 Copa del Rey de Baloncesto	Real Madrid	Herbalife Gran Canaria	85–81	One-game playoff
Sweden	2015–16 Basketligan season	Södertälje Kings	Norrköping Dolphins	4–0	Best-of-7 series
Switzerland	2015–16 Championnat LNA season	Fribourg Olympic	Union Neuchâtel	4–2	Best-of-7 series
Turkey	2015–16 Basketbol Süper Ligi	Fenerbahçe	Anadolu Efes	4–2	Best-of-7 series
Turkey	2016 Turkish Cup Basketball	Fenerbahçe	Darüşşafaka Doğuş	67–65	One-game playoff
Ukraine	2015–16 SL Favorit Sport season	BC Khimik	BC Dynamo Kyiv	3–1	Best-of-5 series
Ukraine	2015–16 Ukrainian Basketball SuperLeague	BC Dnipro	BC Budivelnyk	3–0	Best-of-5 series
United States	2015–16 NBA Development League season	Sioux Falls Skyforce	Los Angeles D-Fenders	2–1	Best-of-3 series
United States	2016 NBA Summer League	Chicago Bulls	Minnesota Timberwolves	84-82	Single-game final

==== Women ====
Nation	League	Champion	Runner-up	Result	Playoff format
Iceland	2015–16 Úrvalsdeild kvenna	Snæfell	Haukar	3–2	Best-of-5 series
United States	2016 WNBA season	Los Angeles Sparks	Minnesota Lynx	3–2	Best-of-5 series

== College seasons ==
=== Men's Division ===
Nation	League	Champions	Runners-up	Result	Playoff format (Finals)	Ref.
Canada	2016 CIS Men's Basketball Championship	Carleton Ravens	Calgary Dinos	101−79	One-game playoff	
Philippines	NCAA Season 92	San Beda Red Lions	Arellano Chiefs	2−0	Best-of-3 series	
Philippines	UAAP Season 79	De La Salle Green Archers	Ateneo Blue Eagles	2−0	Best-of-3 series	
United States	NCAA Division I	Villanova Wildcats	North Carolina Tar Heels	77−74	One-game playoff	
United States	National Invitation Tournament	George Washington	Valparaiso Crusaders	76−60	One-game playoff	
United States	NCAA Division II	Augustana University Vikings	Lincoln Memorial	90−81	One-game playoff	
United States	NCAA Division III	St. Thomas (MN)	Benedictine University	82−76	One-game playoff	
United States	NAIA Division I	Mid-America Christian University	Georgetown Tigers	100−99	One-game playoff	
United States	NAIA Division II	Indiana Wesleyan Wildcats	Saint Francis (IND)	69−66	One-game playoff	

Other sources:

NAIA Division I:

NAIA Division II:

=== Women ===
- (United States) NCAA
  - Division I: Connecticut 82, Syracuse 51
  - Women's National Invitation Tournament: South Dakota 71, Florida Gulf Coast 65
  - Division II: Lubbock Christian 78, Alaska Anchorage 73
  - Division III: Thomas More 83, Tufts 63
- (United States) NAIA
  - Division I: MidAmerica Nazarene 49, Baker 35
  - Division II: Marian 59, Southern Oregon 48
- (Canada) CIS, 2016: Saskatchewan 85, Ryerson 71

== Notable events ==
- February 3- The San Miguel Beermen won their 22nd championship in the 2015-16 PBA Philippine Cup Finals. They were the first professional basketball team in the world to win a title coming down from a 0-3 deficit in a best-of-7 finals series.
- April 13– Los Angeles Lakers legend Kobe Bryant played his final NBA game against the Utah Jazz as he finished his career with a 60-point performance. The 13th pick in the legendary 1996 draft, Bryant won 5 championships with the Lakers, and is believed as one of the greatest basketball players of all time.
- April 13– The Golden State Warriors set the NBA single-season victory mark by notching their 73rd win in the season's final game. The Warriors finished the regular-season with a 73–9 record.
- April–All three NCAA division women's basketball champions finished with undefeated seasons - Connecticut (38–0), Lubbock Christian (35–0), Thomas More (33–0)
- June 19- The Cleveland Cavaliers won their 1st championship in the 2016 NBA Finals. The Cavs were the first in the NBA history to make a historic comeback in pursuit of title coming down from a 1-3 series deficit.
- June 28- Legendary Tennessee basketball coach Pat Summitt dies at the age of 64; in her 38-year coaching career her 1,098 wins were the most of any men's or women's basketball coach.
- September 23- In the 2016 PBA Governors' Cup Playoffs, The Barangay Ginebra San Miguel made its first-ever Final 4 appearance after an 8-conference quarterfinal drought.
- October 9- Jimmy Alapag became the All-Time Leader in three-point shots made in the PBA history in the second game of the 2016 PBA Governors' Cup Finals.
- October 14- June Mar Fajardo settled a history after getting his third straight MVP award in the PBA Leo Awards, tying also with Bogs Adornado.
- October 19- The Barangay Ginebra San Miguel clinched their first ever championship in 8 years after defeating the Meralco Bolts with a 3-point buzzer beater made by Justin Brownlee, via a 91-88 victory in Game 6 of the 2016 PBA Governors' Cup Finals. This also count that its head coach, Tim Cone, won its 19th championship in his coaching career.

== 2016 in basketball results ==
- National Basketball Association:
  - February 14- The Western Conference defeated the Eastern Conference in the 2016 NBA All-Star Game, 196-173.
- NBA Playoffs:
  - Western Conference Finals: The Golden State Warriors defeated the Oklahoma City Thunder, 4 games to 3. This marked that the Warriors are the only 10th team in the league history to win a conference finals coming from a 1-3 series deficit.
  - Eastern Conference Finals: The Cleveland Cavaliers defeated the Toronto Raptors, 4 games to 2. This series also marked that the Raptors are the first ever non-USA based basketball team to reach a conference finals.
- NBA Finals: The Eastern Conference Champions Cleveland Cavaliers defeated the Western Conference Champions, Golden State Warriors, 4 games to 3, to clinch their 1st ever championship in their franchise history.
- Philippine Basketball Association:
  - February 3- The San Miguel Beermen defeated the Alaska Aces, 96-89, in Game 7 to win the 22nd PBA Crown and their back-to-back PBA Philippine Cup titles. This also marked a historic comeback from a 0-3 deficit in a best-of-7 finals series.
  - May 18- The Rain or Shine Elasto Painters defeated the Alaska Aces in the 2016 PBA Commissioner's Cup Finals, 4 games to 2. This also marked where in the Painters clinched the title for only the 2nd time in their franchise. Also, this championship series marked that there was no team owned by the MVP Group of Companies and the San Miguel Corporation to ever reach the finals.

== Deaths ==
- January 5 — Bob Armstrong, American NBA player (Philadelphia Warriors) (born 1933)
- January 7 — Bill Foster, American college coach (born 1929)
- January 7 — John Johnson, American NBA player (Cleveland Cavaliers, Portland Trail Blazers, Houston Rockets, Seattle SuperSonics) (born 1947)
- January 12 — Andrew Smith, American college (Butler) and professional (Neptūnas) player (born 1990)
- January 13 — Jim Simpson, American NBA and college announcer (born 1927)
- January 15 – Rex Morgan, American NBA player (Boston Celtics) (born 1948)
- January 15 – Buzzy Wilkinson, All-American college player (Virginia) (born 1932)
- January 17 – Sherron Mills, American player (BCM Gravelines, Mens Sana 1871 Basket) (born 1971)
- January 18 – Johnny Bach, American NBA player (Boston Celtics) and coach. (born 1924)
- January 23 – Bill Roberts, American NBA (St. Louis Bombers) and BAA (Boston Celtics, Chicago Stags) player (born 1925)
- January 23 – Bobby Wanzer, American Hall of Fame NBA player (Rochester Royals) and coach. (born 1921)
- January 27 – Augusto Giomo, Italian Olympic player (1960, 1964) (born 1940)
- January 27 – Carlos Loyzaga, Filipino Olympic (1952, 1956) and professional player and coach (born 1930)
- January 30 – Ken Sailors, American BAA/NBA player and college All-American (Wyoming) (born 1921)
- January 31 – Bob Pelkington, American college player (Xavier), NCAA leading rebounder (1964) (born 1941)
- February 6 – York Larese, American NBA player (Chicago Packers, Philadelphia Warriors) and ABA coach (New York Nets) (born 1938)
- February 12 – Bennie Purcell, American college player (Murray State) (born 1929)
- February 22 – Steve Harris, American NBA player (born 1963)
- February 23 – Eddie Parry, American NBL player (born 1918)
- February 24 – Eddie Einhorn, Hall of Fame college basketball television and radio executive (born 1936)
- March 2 – Aubrey McClendon, American co-owner of the Oklahoma City Thunder (born 1959)
- March 6 – Arto Koivisto, Finnish player (born 1930)
- March 8 – Esko Karhunen, Finnish Olympic player (born 1928)
- March 9 – Clyde Lovellette, American Hall of Fame NBA player (Minneapolis Lakers, Cincinnati Royals, St. Louis Hawks, Boston Celtics) (born 1929)
- March 12 – Larry Moore, 73, American ABA player (Anaheim Amigos).
- March 16 – Gene Short, American NBA player (Seattle SuperSonics, New York Knicks) (born 1953)
- March 27 – Vince Boryla, American NBA player and coach (New York Knicks), Olympic champion (1948) (born 1927)
- March 31 – Tom Butters, American athletic director (Duke) and former head of the NCAA Tournament selection committee (born 1939)
- March 31 – Eugene Parker, American college basketball player (Purdue) (born 1956)
- April 4 – Archie Dees, American NBA player (born 1936)
- April 5 – Ed Johnson, American ABA player (Los Angeles Stars, New York Nets, Texas Chaparrals) (born 1945)
- April 6 – Murray Wier, American NBA player (Tri-Cities Blackhawks) (born 1926)
- April 11 – Ed Snider, American NBA owner (Philadelphia 76ers) (born 1933)
- April 13 – Nera White, American Hall of Fame player (born 1935)
- April 16 – Ron Bonham, American NBA/ABA player (Boston Celtics, Indiana Pacers) (born 1942)
- April 19 – John McConathy, American NBA player (Milwaukee Hawks) (born 1930)
- April 20 – Dwayne Washington, American college All-American (Syracuse) and NBA player (New Jersey Nets, Miami Heat) (born 1964)
- April 26 – Ozzie Silna, American ABA owner (Carolina Cougars/Spirits of St. Louis) (born 1932)
- May 2 – Al Ferrari, American NBA player (St. Louis Hawks, Chicago Zephyrs) (born 1933)
- May 9 – Rex Hughes, American college (Kent State) and NBA coach (Sacramento Kings) (born 1938)
- May 16 – Jim McMillian, American NBA player (Los Angeles Lakers) (born 1948)
- May 28 – Bryce Dejean-Jones, American NBA player (New Orleans Pelicans) (born 1992)
- June 2 – Lee Pfund, American college coach (Wheaton) (born 1919)
- June 7 – Sean Rooks, American NBA player (born 1969)
- June 9 – Brooks Thompson, American NBA player and college coach (UTSA) (born 1970)
- June 22 – Roberto Lovera, Uruguayan Olympic bronze medalist (1952) (born 1922)
- June 25 – Hal Lear, All-American college (Temple) and NBA player (Philadelphia Warriors) (born 1935)
- June 26 – Gino Sovran, Canadian BAA player (Toronto Huskies) (born 1924)
- June 28 – Pat Summitt, Hall of Fame college basketball coach (Tennessee Lady Volunteers) (born 1952)
- June 30 – Witold Zagórski, Polish Olympic player (1964, 1968, 1972) (born 1930)
- July 3 – Gilbert Bulawan, Filipino PBA player (Blackwater Elite) (born 1986)
- July 5 – Kari Hautala, Finnish player (Torpan Pojat) (born 1973)
- July 9 – Vaughn Harper, American college player (Syracuse) (born 1945)
- July 10 – Harry Wade, Canadian Olympic player (1952) (born 1928)
- July 16 – Bennie Lenox, American college player (Texas A&M) (born 1941)
- July 16 – Nate Thurmond, American Hall of Fame NBA player (San Francisco Warriors, Chicago Bulls, Cleveland Cavaliers) (born 1941)
- July 17 – Raúl Feliciano, Puerto Rican player (University of Puerto Rico, Santos de San Juan, Cardenales de Río Piedras) (born 1930)
- July 25 – Dwight Jones, American NBA player and Olympic silver medalist (1972) (born 1952)
- July 28 – Bob Brown, American NBA player (Providence Steamrollers, Denver Nuggets) (born 1923)
- August 3 – Abdul Jeelani, American NBA player (Portland Trail Blazers, Dallas Mavericks) (born 1954)
- August 4 – Albert Nicholas, All-American college player (Wisconsin Badgers) (born 1931)
- August 10 – John Saunders, Canadian/American NBA television play by play announcer (born 1955)
- August 13 – Allen Kelley, American college national champion at Kansas (1952) and Olympic gold medalist (1960) (born 1932)
- August 15 – Richard Wackar, American college coach (Rowan) (born 1928)
- August 17 – Baby Dalupan, Filipino college and professional coach (born 1923)
- August 22 – Michael Brooks, All-American college player (La Salle) and NBA player (born 1958)
- August 22 – Paul Landreaux, American college coach (El Camino College, Saint Mary's) (born 1943)
- August 24 – Nina Yeryomina, Russian player, World Champion (1959) (born 1933)
- September 22 – George Hanson, American college coach (Minnesota) (born 1935)
- September 26 – Jack Cotton, American NBA player (Denver Nuggets) (born 1924)
- October 4 – Cameron Moore, American Serie A player (Reyer Venezia Mestre) (born 1990)
- October 6 – Fred Slaughter, American national champion college player (UCLA) (born 1942)
- October 16 – Viktor Zubkov, Soviet Olympic silver medalist (1956, 1960) (born 1937)
- October 19 – Tommy Bartlett, American college coach (Chattanooga, Florida) (born 1928)
- October 21 – David Pope, American NBA player (Kansas City Kings, Seattle SuperSonics) (born 1962)
- October 21 – Jerry Rullo, American BAA/NBA player (Philadelphia Warriors, Baltimore Bullets) (born 1923)
- October 22 – Bob Vanatta, American college coach (Missouri State, Memphis, Missouri) (born 1918)
- November 9 – Greg Ballard, American NBA player (Washington Bullets, Golden State Warriors, Seattle SuperSonics) (born 1955)
- November 20 — Gene Guarilia, American NBA player (Boston Celtics) (born 1937)
- November 24 — Norm Swanson, American NBA player (Rochester Royals) (born 1930)
- November 26 — Harry Flournoy, American college player (UTEP), NCAA champion (1966) (born 1943)
- December 15 — Craig Sager, American NBA sideline reporter (born 1951)
- December 18 — Sonny Moran, American college coach (Morris Harvey, West Virginia) (born 1926)
- December 24 — Pape Badiane, French player (Chorale Roanne, Le Mans, Poitiers Basket 86) (born 1980)
- December 31 — Orvis Sigler, American college coach (Army, Centenary) (born 1922)

== See also ==
- Timeline of women's basketball
