= 2015 Kazakhstan Basketball Cup =

Sports event

Kazakhstan Basketball Cup
- Season: 2015
- Duration: 18 – 22 February 2015
- Games played: 12
- Teams: 6 (4 in the final four)

Finals
- Champions: Almaty Legion; 1st title
- Runners-up: Tobol Kostanay
- Semifinalists: PBC Kapchagay; Caspiy Aktau
- Finals MVP: Yuri Kozhanov (Almaty Legion)

Statistical leaders
- Points: Nikolai Bazhin (Tobol Kostanay)

Records
- Highest scoring: PBC Kapchagay 110-45 Almaty Legion
- Highest attendance: 5 matches on 500 spectators
- Lowest attendance: 3 matches without spectators
- Average attendance: 259 spectators

The 2015 Kazakhstan Basketball Cup (Kazakh: 2015 маусымдағы баскетболдан Қазақстан Кубогы; Russian: Кубок Казахстана по баскетболу сезон 2015) was the 13th edition of the Kazakhstan Basketball Cup, the highest professional cup basketball competition in Kazakhstan.

== Group stage ==
=== Group A ===
Team	Pld	W	L	GF	GA	GD	Pts
Tobol Kostanay	2	2	0	170	147	+23	4
Almaty Legion	2	1	1	167	144	+23	3
Barsy Atyrau	2	0	2	148	200	−52	2

18 February
19:00

Almaty Legion 66, Tobol Kostanay 71
Scoring by quarter: 20–11, 13–20, 17–16, 16–23
Pts: Mikhail Evstigneev 16	Pts: Alexander Derbush 15

Sport Complex Dostyk, Almaty
Attendance: 300

19 February
17:00

Tobol Kostanay 99, Barsy Atyrau 81
Scoring by quarter: 18–19, 26–21, 28–29, 27–12
Pts: Nikolai Bazhin 39	Pts: Anton Kotenko 36

Sport Complex Dostyk, Almaty
Attendance: 500

20 February
19:00

Barsy Atyrau 68, Almaty Legion 101
Scoring by quarter: 26–24, 18–26, 14–32, 10–19
Pts: Anton Kotenko 21	Pts: Yuri Kozhanov 29

Sport Complex Dostyk, Almaty
Attendance: 300

=== Group B ===
Team	Pld	W	L	GF	GA	GD	Pts
PBC Kapchagay	2	2	0	197	104	+93	4
Caspiy Aktau	2	1	1	134	155	−21	3
Almaty Legion - KazSU	2	0	2	133	185	−52	2

18 February
17:00

Almaty Legion - KazSU 45, PBC Kapchagay 110
Scoring by quarter: 17–34, 15–21, 5–18, 8–37
Pts: Vadim Korzhov 12	Pts: Leonid Bondarovich 24

Sport Complex Dostyk, Almaty
Attendance: 0

19 February
19:00

Almaty Legion - KazSU 68, Caspiy Aktau 75
Scoring by quarter: 18–11, 15–25, 15–24, 20–15
Pts: Leonid Voronushkin 18	Pts: Sergei Kazantsev 19

Sport Complex Dostyk, Almaty
Attendance: 500

20 February
17:00

Caspiy Aktau 59, PBC Kapchagay 87
Scoring by quarter: 20–26, 12–23, 17–13, 10–25
Pts: Azim Yagodkin 20	Pts: Dmitri Gavrilov 29

Sport Complex Dostyk, Almaty
Attendance: 0

== Semi-final ==
21 February
13:00

PBC Kapchagay 88, Almaty Legion 89
Scoring by quarter: 21–18, 21–21, 18–21, 28–29
Pts: Dmitri Gavrilov 25	Pts: Vsevolod Fadeikin 19

Sport Complex Dostyk, Almaty
Attendance: 500

21 February
15:00

Caspiy Aktau 55, Tobol Kostanay 79
Scoring by quarter: 15–32, 12–13, 17–21, 11–13
Pts: Sergei Kazantsev 13	Pts: Farid Karimulin, Nikolai Bazhin 14

Sport Complex Dostyk, Almaty
Attendance: 500

== Match for the 5th place ==
21 February
11:00

Almaty Legion - KazSU 72, Barsy Atyrau 92
Scoring by quarter: 20–22, 21–32, 19–22, 12–16
Pts: Igor Timyaev 15	Pts: Evgeni Isakov 24

Sport Complex Dostyk, Almaty
Attendance: 0

22 February
11:00

Barsy Atyrau 84, Almaty Legion - KazSU 85
Scoring by quarter: 16–29, 27–16, 22–23, 19–17
Pts: Zhalgas Nurgaliev 19	Pts: Ruslan Aitkali 26

Sport Complex Dostyk, Almaty
Attendance: 10

== Bronze medal match ==
22 February
13:00

Caspiy Aktau 66, PBC Kapchagay 77
Scoring by quarter: 12–21, 16–18, 23–14, 15–24
Pts: Maxim Smirnov 17	Pts: Vasili Shevchenko 19

Sport Complex Dostyk, Almaty
Attendance: 5

== Final ==
22 February
15:00

Tobol Kostanay 86, Almaty Legion 90
Scoring by quarter: 26–18, 25–24, 17–17, 18–31
Pts: Farid Karimulin, Nikolai Bazhin 19	Pts: Yuri Kozhanov 26

Sport Complex Dostyk, Almaty
Attendance: 500
