= Kazakhstan men's national basketball team =

Kazakhstan
- FIBA ranking: 81 ▲5 (1 September 2026)
- Joined FIBA: 1992
- FIBA zone: FIBA Asia
- National federation: Kazakhstan Basketball Federation
- Coach: Renatas Kurilionokas
- Nickname: Snow Leopards

Asian Championship
- Appearances: 9
- Medals: None
Home	Away

The Kazakhstan national basketball team represents Kazakhstan in basketball international competitions. They belong to the FIBA Asia zone.

== History ==
Kazakhstan's best finish in international competition was in the 2002 Asian Games, beating the Philippines in the bronze medal game, and a fourth-place finish in the FIBA Asia Championship 2007 losing out to Korea in the third-place game. At 2014 Asian Games, Kazakhstan end up on a 4th place after losing to Japan in third place match.

== Competitions ==
=== FIBA Asia Cup ===
Year	Position	Pld	W	L
1960 to 1991	Part of Soviet Union			
(Indonesia) 1993	did not enter			
(South Korea) 1995	5th place	8	6	2
(Saudi Arabia) 1997	13th place	6	2	4
(Japan) 1999	Withdrew			
(China) 2001	did not enter			
(China) 2003	7th place	7	3	4
(Qatar) 2005	10th place	7	4	3
(Japan) 2007	4th place	8	4	4
(China) 2009	9th place	8	4	4
(China) 2011	did not enter			
(Philippines) 2013	8th place	9	3	6
(China) 2015	11th place	8	2	6
(Lebanon) 2017	16th place	3	0	3
(Indonesia) 2022	15th place	3	0	3
(Saudi Arabia) 2025	did not qualify			
2029	to be determined			
Total	10/31	67	28	39

=== Asian Games ===
Year	Rank	P	W	L
1951 to 1990	Part of Soviet Union			
(Japan) 1994	5th place	6	3	3
(Thailand) 1998	4th place	5	2	3
(South Korea) 2002	3rd place	7	4	3
(Qatar) 2006	7th place	10	6	4
(China) 2010	did not enter			
(South Korea) 2014	4th place	10	4	6
(Indonesia) 2018	13th place	2	0	2
(China) 2022	11th place	4	1	3
(Japan) 2026	11th place	3	0	3
Total	8/20	47	20	27

== Team ==
=== Current roster ===
==== 2021 FIBA Asia Cup qualification ====
Opposition: Palestine (21 February)
Venue: Saryarka Velodrome, Nur-Sultan
Opposition: Jordan (24 February)
Venue: Saryarka Velodrome, Nur-Sultan

Kazakhstan national basketball team – 2021 FIBA Asia Cup qualification roster
Players
Coaches

Pos.	No.	Name	Age – Date of birth	Height	Club	Ctr.
PG	5	Anthony Clemmons	25 – 15 August 1994	1.88 m (6 ft 2 in)	Dinamo Sassari	(Italy)
PG	6	Shaim Kuanov	28 – 28 July 1991	1.81 m (5 ft 11 in)	BC Tobol	(Kazakhstan)
SF	7	Nikolay Bazhin	29 – 9 December 1990	1.98 m (6 ft 6 in)	BC Astana	(Kazakhstan)
SG	9	Vadim Chsherbak	26 – 24 May 1993	1.86 m (6 ft 1 in)	BC Astana	(Kazakhstan)
PG	10	Rustam Murzagaliyev	27 – 24 May 1992	1.92 m (6 ft 4 in)	BC Astana	(Kazakhstan)
C	11	Anton Ponomarev	31 – 31 October 1988	2.05 m (6 ft 9 in)	BC Tobol	(Kazakhstan)
PF	17	Alexandr Zhigulin	25 – 26 April 1994	2.02 m (6 ft 8 in)	BC Astana	(Kazakhstan)
C	20	Anton Bykov	30 – 18 April 1989	1.98 m (6 ft 6 in)	BC Tobol	(Kazakhstan)
PF	21	Roman Marchuk	26 – 4 March 1993	1.98 m (6 ft 6 in)	PSC Sinegoryie	(Kazakhstan)
C	22	Askar Maidekin	22 – 28 May 1997	2.03 m (6 ft 8 in)	BC Astana	(Kazakhstan)
C	24	Dmitriy Gavrilov	33 – 27 November 1986	2.00 m (6 ft 7 in)	BC Astana	(Kazakhstan)
SG	25	Maxim Marchuk	26 – 17 January 1994	1.96 m (6 ft 5 in)	BC Astana	(Kazakhstan)

Head coach

- (North Macedonia) Emil Rajković

Assistant coach(es)

- (Kazakhstan) Yevgeniy Issakov
- (Serbia) Marko Velickovic

Legend

- (C) Team captain
- Club – describes last
  club before the tournament
- Age – describes age
  on 21 February 2020

=== Past roster ===
==== 2021 FIBA Asia Cup qualification ====
Opposition: Palestine (21 February)
Venue: Saryarka Velodrome, Nur-Sultan
Opposition: Jordan (24 February)
Venue: Saryarka Velodrome, Nur-Sultan

Kazakhstan national basketball team – 2021 FIBA Asia Cup qualification roster
Players
Coaches

Pos.	No.	Name	Age – Date of birth	Height	Club	Ctr.
PG	5	Anthony Clemmons	25 – 15 August 1994	1.88 m (6 ft 2 in)		(United States)
PG	6	Shaim Kuanov	28 – 28 July 1991	1.81 m (5 ft 11 in)	BC Tobol	(Kazakhstan)
SF	7	Nikolay Bazhin	29 – 9 December 1990	1.98 m (6 ft 6 in)	BC Astana	(Kazakhstan)
SG	9	Vadim Chsherbak	26 – 24 May 1993	1.86 m (6 ft 1 in)	BC Astana	(Kazakhstan)
PG	10	Rustam Murzagaliyev	27 – 24 May 1992	1.92 m (6 ft 4 in)	BC Astana	(Kazakhstan)
C	11	Anton Ponomarev	31 – 31 October 1988	2.05 m (6 ft 9 in)	BC Tobol	(Kazakhstan)
PF	17	Alexandr Zhigulin	25 – 26 April 1994	2.02 m (6 ft 8 in)	BC Astana	(Kazakhstan)
C	20	Anton Bykov	30 – 18 April 1989	1.98 m (6 ft 6 in)	BC Tobol	(Kazakhstan)
PF	21	Roman Marchuk	26 – 4 March 1993	1.98 m (6 ft 6 in)	PSC Sinegoryie	(Kazakhstan)
C	22	Askar Maidekin	22 – 28 May 1997	2.03 m (6 ft 8 in)	BC Astana	(Kazakhstan)
C	24	Dmitriy Gavrilov	33 – 27 November 1986	2.00 m (6 ft 7 in)	BC Astana	(Kazakhstan)
SG	25	Maxim Marchuk	26 – 17 January 1994	1.96 m (6 ft 5 in)	BC Astana	(Kazakhstan)

Head coach

- (North Macedonia) Emil Rajković

Assistant coach(es)

- (Kazakhstan) Yevgeniy Issakov
- (Serbia) Marko Velickovic

Legend

- (C) Team captain
- Club – describes last
  club before the tournament
- Age – describes age
  on 21 February 2020

Roster for the 2017 FIBA Asia Cup.

Kazakhstan men's national basketball team – 2017 FIBA Asia Cup roster
Players
Coaches

Pos.	No.	Name	Age – Date of birth	Height	Club	Ctr.
PF	1	Denis Degtyarev	26 – 5 October 1990	2.00 m (6 ft 7 in)	BC Astana	(Kazakhstan)
G	2	Azim Yagodkin	25 – 21 February 1992	1.83 m (6 ft 0 in)	BC Caspiy Aktau	(Kazakhstan)
SF	5	Roman Marchuk	24 – 4 March 1993	1.96 m (6 ft 5 in)	BC Caspiy Aktau	(Kazakhstan)
G	6	Rustam Murzagaliyev	25 – 24 May 1992	1.96 m (6 ft 5 in)	BC Astana	(Kazakhstan)
SF	7	Nikolay Bazhkin	26 – 9 December 1990	1.96 m (6 ft 5 in)	BC Barsy Atyrau	(Kazakhstan)
SG	9	Pavel Ilin	25 – 24 May 1992	1.94 m (6 ft 4 in)	BC Barsy Atyrau	(Kazakhstan)
SG	10	Vassiliy Savchenko	30 – 13 June 1987	1.90 m (6 ft 3 in)	BC Barsy Atyrau	(Kazakhstan)
PF	11	Anton Ponomarev	28 – 31 October 1988	2.09 m (6 ft 10 in)	BC Astana	(Kazakhstan)
SG	13	Rustam Yargaliyev	30 – 20 December 1986	1.93 m (6 ft 4 in)	BC Astana	(Kazakhstan)
C	15	Mikhail Yevstigneyev	33 – 5 July 1984	2.00 m (6 ft 7 in)	BC Barsy Atyrau	(Kazakhstan)
C	17	Alexander Zhigulin	23 – 26 April 1994	2.05 m (6 ft 9 in)	BC Astana	(Kazakhstan)
SF	25	Maxim Marchuk	23 – 17 January 1994	1.94 m (6 ft 4 in)	BC Astana	(Kazakhstan)

Head coach

- (Russia) Mikhail Karpenko

Assistant coach(es)

- (Lithuania) Renatas Kurilionokas

Legend

- (C) Team captain
- (NP) Naturalized player
- Club – describes last
  club before the tournament
- Age – describes age
  on 8 August 2017

=== Depth chart ===
Pos.	Starting 5	Bench 1	Bench 2
C	Mikhail Yevstigneyev	Alexander Zhigulin
PF	Anton Ponomarev	Maxim Marchuk	Denis Degtyarev
SF	Pavel Ilin	Nikolay Bazhkin	Roman Marchuk
SG	Rustam Yargaliyev	Vassiliy Savchenko
PG	Azim Yagodkin	Rustam Murzagaliyev

== Head coach position ==
- (Russia) (Kazakhstan) Vitaliy Strebkov – 2005–2009
- (Russia) (Kazakhstan) Vadim Burakov – 2010
- (Italy) Matteo Boniciolli – 2012–2013
- (Russia) (Kazakhstan) Vitaliy Strebkov – 2014–2015
- (Ukraine) Eduard Skrypets – 2016–2017
- (Russia) Mikhail Karpenko – 2017–2018
- (Lithuania) Renatas Kurilionokas – 2018–2019
- (North Macedonia) Emil Rajković – 2020–2021
- (Russia) Oleg Kisilev – 2022–2024

== Notable players ==
Other current notable players from Kazakhstan:

Kazakhstan roster
Players	Coaches
Pos. / No. / Name / Age – Date of birth / Height / Club / Ctr.; PG / / Jerry Johnson / 35 – 23 April 1982 / 1.82 m (6 ft 0 in) / BC Neptūnas / (Lithuania); Legend: Club – describes current club; Age – describes age on 12 March 2018

== Past rosters ==
Roster for the 2015 FIBA Asia Championship: Head coach: (Kazakhstan) Vitaliy Strebkov

#	Pos	Name	Club	Date of Birth	Height
5	G	Jerry Jamar Johnson	(Kazakhstan) BC Astana	23 April 1982 (aged 33)	1.83 m (6 ft 0 in)
6	G	Rustam Murzagaliyev	(Kazakhstan) BC Astana	24 May 1992 (aged 23)	1.96 m (6 ft 5 in)
7	F	Maxim Marchuk	(Kazakhstan) BC Astana	17 January 1994 (aged 21)	1.98 m (6 ft 6 in)
8	F	Maxim Smirnov	(Kazakhstan) BC Caspiy Aktau	25 December 1986 (aged 28)	2.06 m (6 ft 9 in)
9	F	Anatoly Bose	(Kazakhstan) BC Astana	6 December 1988 (aged 26)	2.00 m (6 ft 6 1/2 in)
10	C	Pavel Ilin	(Kazakhstan) BC Astana	24 May 1992 (aged 23)	1.96 m (6 ft 5 in)
11	C	Anton Ponomarev	(Kazakhstan) BC Astana	31 October 1988 (aged 26)	2.11 m (6 ft 11 in)
12	F	Dmitriy Klimov	(Kazakhstan) BC Astana	5 September 1988 (aged 27)	2.00 m (6 ft 6 1/2 in)
13	G	Rustam Yargaliyev	(Kazakhstan) BC Astana	20 December 1986 (aged 28)	1.94 m (6 ft 4 1/2 in)
14	F	Dmitriy Gavrilov	(Kazakhstan) BC Barsy Atyrau	27 November 1986 (aged 28)	2.03 m (6 ft 8 in)
15	C	Alexandr Zhigulin	(Kazakhstan) BC Astana	26 April 1994 (aged 21)	2.05 m (6 ft 8 1/2 in)

== Kit ==
=== Sponsor ===
2015: ISKER

== See also ==
- Kazakhstan national under-17 basketball team
- Kazakhstan national under-19 basketball team
- Kazakhstan women's national basketball team
