= Dejan Parežanin =

Serbian basketball coach and player

Kitana
- Title: Head coach
- League: Kazakhstan Championship; VTB United League

Personal information
- Born: 27 May 1971 (age 55) Zemun, SR Serbia, Yugoslavia
- Listed weight: 110 kg (243 lb)

Career information
- NBA draft: 1993: undrafted
- Playing career: 1988–2005
- Position: Point guard
- Number: 4, 7
- Coaching career: 2005–present

Career history

Playing
- 1988–1990: Partizan
- 1991–1992: Infos RTM Beograd
- 1992–1994: OKK Beograd
- 1994–1996: Kikinda
- 1996–1999: Radnički Beograd
- 1999–2003: Igokea
- 2003–2005: Bosna

Coaching
- 2005–2007: Vogošća
- 2007–2008: Bosna (assistant)
- 2008–2010: Vogošća
- 2010–2011: Bosna
- 2011: Zrinjski
- 2014–2015: Mega Basket U17
- 2015–2016: Vojvodina Srbijagas
- 2017–2022: Astana PC Academy
- 2022–present: Astana

Career highlights
- As player: FIBA Korać Cup champion (1989); 2× Bosnian League champion (2001, 2005); Bosnian Cup winner (2005); 2× Yugoslav Cup winner (1989, 1993)

Dejan Parežanin (Serbian Cyrillic: Дејан Парежанин; born 27 May 1971) is a Serbian professional basketball coach and former player who is the current head coach for Astana of the VTB United League and the Kazakhstan Championship.

== Playing career ==
A point guard, Parežanin spent 17 seasons in Yugoslavia and Bosnia and Herzegovina, from 1988 to 2005. During his playing days, he played for Partizan, Infos RTM Beograd, OKK Beograd, OKK Kikinda, Radnički Beograd, Igokea and Bosna. He retired as a player with Bosna in 2005.

== Coaching career ==
After retirement in 2005, Parežanin joined Vogošća as their head coach. During the 2007–08 season, he was an assistant coach for Bosna under Jure Zdovc. Later, Parežanin was again the head coach for Vogošća prior he signed for Bosna in January 2010. He left Bosnia in April 2011.

In June 2011, Zrinjski hired Parežanin as their new head coach. He parted ways with Zrinjski in December 2011.

In 2017, Parežanin was appointed as the head coach for the Astana Presidential Club Basketball Academy. In March 2022, Astana hired Parežanin as their new head coach, following departure of Darko Russo.

=== National teams ===
Parežanin was an assistant coach for the Kazakhstan national team at the 2022 FIBA Asia Cup qualification.
