= Anton Ponomarev =

Kazakhstani basketball player

Personal information
- Born: 31 October 1988 (age 38) Kostanay, Kazakhstan
- Listed height: 209 cm (6 ft 10 in)
- Listed weight: 114 kg (251 lb)

Career information
- NBA draft: 2010: undrafted
- Playing career: 2002–2023
- Position: Power forward / center

Career history
- 2002–2010: Astana Tigers
- 2010: FMP Belgrade
- 2011: Spartak Primorje
- 2011–2021: BC Astana
- 2021–2022: BK Aktobe
- 2022–2023: BC Astana

Career highlights
- 10x Kazakhstan League (2004-2010, 2011-2015); VTB United League Top Kazakh Player (2013); 7x Kazakhstan Cup (2004, 2006, 2008, 2011-2014)

Anton Ponomarev (born 31 October 1988) is a Kazakhstani former professional basketball player.

== Professional career ==
=== Astana Tigers ===
Ponomarev was brought to the capital Astana by newly formed Astana Tigers in 2000, along with other Kostanay players such as Rustam Yargaliev. They lived in the Olympic reserve school with other athletes.

Ponomarev started playing in the Kazakhstan Basketball Championship during the 2002-2003 season. At only 15, he already measured 209 cm (6 ft 10 1/2 in), the second tallest player in the country.

The next season Ponomarev and the Tigers won their first titles, achieving a domestic double with the Cup and the Championship. The Astana side would proceed to win the next 5 championships whilst he was playing for them, also adding 2 more cups.

He entered the 2009 NBA draft as an early entrant in May 2009, but withdrew before the deadline. After participating in the Reebok Eurocamp in Treviso, he signed a 4-year contract with French side Hyères-Toulon Var Basket in June of the same year. However, it later emerged that he was still under contract with Astana, who opposed the move, leading him to stay in Kazakhstan.

In September 2010 the Kazakhstani moved to Serbian side FMP Belgrade following the expiry of his Tigers contract, reportedly signing a multi-year deal. He averaged only 5.7 minutes (0.8 points and 1.4 rebounds) in 9 games for FMP, leading to a mutual separation with the Serbians.

He then joined second division Russian Basketball Super League side Spartak Primorje in early 2011, first on trial then on a permanent contract in February. Ponomarev stayed there until the end of the season, contributing 6.1 points and 5.1 rebounds in about 14 minutes per game in 14 games.

Whilst in Russia, he was contacted by Valeri Tikhonenko, the general manager of newly formed BC Astana to ask him to join the club and play in the VTB United League, an offer he accepted.

He was named the initial Top Kazakh Player by the league in 2013 after posting 8 points and 5.3 rebounds for a 10.4 efficiency rating in the league during 2012-13.

== International career ==
Ponomarev made his debut for the Kazakhstan national basketball team with the Under-18's at the 2004 FIBA Asia Under-18 Championship.

He played for the senior side at the 2007 FIBA Asia Championship, leading the team in scoring and rebounding with 17.6 points and 7.1 rebounds per game, 8th best in the tournament for the latter.

In the 2009 FIBA Asia Championship he posted 15.6 points and 9.6 rebounds (3rd best in tournament).

In the 2013 FIBA Asia Championship he had a lessened impact, posting 7.8 points and 7.8 rebounds, albeit again best rebounder for Kazakhstan (and 8th best overall). His coach Matteo Boniciolli, whilst labeling him a major player for the team, bemoaned his up and down performances.

At the 2014 Asian Games he contributed 11.4 points and a tournament best 9.3 rebounds for Kazakhstan.

== Personal ==
Ponomarev originally practiced kickboxing, with no interest in basketball until he was 10 years old and attended a training session with a friend, at first he only played as a hobby before taking the game more seriously later.
