= Rustam Murzagaliyev =

Kazakh basketball player

Rustam Murzagalyiev
No. 3 – BC Astana
- Position: Guard
- League: FIBA Asia Champions Cup; VTB United League; Kazakhstan Basketball Championship

Personal information
- Born: 24 May 1992 (age 34) Shymkent, Kazakhstan
- Listed height: 6 ft 3 in (1.91 m)

Career information
- Playing career: 2011–present

Career history
- 2012–present: BC Astana

Rustam Murzagalyiev (born 24 May 1992) is a Kazakh professional basketball player, currently with BC Astana of the VTB United League and the Kazakhstan Basketball Championship.

He represented Kazakhstan's national basketball team at the 2017 FIBA Asia Cup in Zouk Mikael, Lebanon, where he was Kazakhstan's best 3 point shooter.
