= 2014–15 Kazakhstan Basketball Championship =

Kazakhstan Basketball Championship
- Season: 2014–15
- Duration: 8 October 2014 – 27 March 2015
- Games played: 45
- Teams: 6 (4 in the regular season)

Regular season
- Top seed: BC Astana

Finals
- Champions: BC Astana; 4th title
- Runners-up: Almatynski Legion
- Semifinalists: PBC Kapchagay; Caspiy Aktau

The 2014–15 Kazakhstan Basketball Championship (Russian: Чемпионата Казахстана по баскетболу сезон 2014–15) was the 23rd season of the Kazakhstan Basketball Championship, the highest professional basketball league in Kazakhstan. Its official designation in full was: XXIIth basketball Championship of the Republic of Kazakhstan for men's teams (National league) (Russian: XXIII-го Чемпионата Республика Казахстан по баскетболу среди мужских команд (Национальной лиги)).

The regular season ran from 8 October 2014 to 27 March 2015, May 9, 2004, 4 teams played 18 games each, with 6 confrontations between every side.

The playoffs ran from 29 March 2015 to 10 April 2015, BC Astana won their fourth consecutive title by beating Almatynski Legion in the final.

== Teams ==
Location of teams of the 2014–15 Kazakhstan Basketball League.

Team	Russian name	City	Arena
Almatynski Legion	ПБК Алматинский легион	Almaty	Sports complex Dostyk
BC Astana	БК Астана	Astana	Saryarka Velodrome
Caspiy Aktau	БК Каспий Актау	Aktau	Sports complex Caspiy
PBC Kapchagay	ПБК Капшагай	Kapchagay	Sports palace Jastar
Barsy Atyrau (Note: Only for the playoffs.)	БК Барсы Атырау	Atyrau	Sports and recreation complex Atyrau
Kazygurt Shymkent	БК Казыгурт Шымкент	Shymkent	Sports and recreation complex Shymkent

== Season narrative ==
BC Astana finished in first place after the regular season, earning the top seed for the playoffs.

All four teams advanced to the playoffs, they were joined by the two best teams of the second division Higher league (Russian: Высшей лиги), namely Kazygurt Shymkent and Barsy Atyrau. The latter two teams played a best-of-three series against Almatynski Legion and Caspiy Aktau, the two lowest ranked National league team sides, who both won their respective series to advance to the final four.

The Final four, with all match-ups decided in a single game, saw Almatynski Legion and Caspiy Aktau play against the top two sides of the regular season, BC Astana and PBC Kapchagay, with Almatynski Legion and BC Astana proceeding to the final, the defeated sides playing for third place. The final saw BC Astana crush Almatynski Legion 82–56 on 10 April 2015 to claim the championship for the fourth time in a row.

== Regular season ==
Pos	Teams	P	W	L	Pts
1	BC Astana	18	12	6	29
2	PBC Kapchagay	18	10	8	28
3	Caspiy Aktau	18	7	11	25
4	Almatynski Legion	18	7	11	25

== Play-offs ==
Quarterfinals
3	Caspiy Aktau	2
6	Barsy Atyrau	1
4	Almatynski Legion	2
5	Kazygurt Shymkent	0

Semifinals
1	BC Astana	1
3	Caspiy Aktau	0
2	PBC Kapchagay	0
3	Almatynski Legion	1

Finals
1	BC Astana	1
3	Almatynski Legion	0

== Semifinals ==
=== BC Astana vs. Caspiy Aktau ===
9 April
19:11

Boxscore

BC Astana 79, Caspiy Aktau 66
Scoring by quarter: 22–13', 16–15, 23–18, 18–20
Pts: Anatoly Kolesnikov 14	Pts: Zhanysh Erns Uulu 20

Saryarka Velodrome, Astana

=== Almatynski Legion vs. PBC Kapchagay ===
9 April
16:42

Boxscore

Almatynski Legion 82, PBC Kapchagay 73
Scoring by quarter: 21–26, 17–11, 21–23, 16–7
Pts: Dmitry Sviridov 20	Pts: Dmitri Gavrilov 17

Saryarka Velodrome, Astana

== Third place game ==
=== Caspiy Aktau vs. PBC Kapchagay ===
10 April
16:43

Boxscore

Caspiy Aktau 76, PBC Kapchagay 56
Scoring by quarter: 19–19, 13–11, 22–23, 22–12
Pts: Kris Richard 19	Pts: Dmitri Gavrilov 16

Saryarka Velodrome, Astana

== Final ==
=== BC Astana vs. Almatynski Legion ===
10 April
18:59

Boxscore

BC Astana 81, Almatynski Legion 56
Scoring by quarter: 26–21, 23–9, 24–13, 8–13
Pts: Jerry Johnson 18	Pts: Evstigneev, Marchuk 10

Saryarka Velodrome, Astana

== All-Kazakhstan Basketball Championship team ==
The league selected their choice of the best players at each position for the season.

- Best point guard: (United States) Jerry Johnson (Astana)
- Best shooting guard: (United States) Kris Richard (Aktau)
- Best small forward: (Kazakhstan) Yuriy Kozhanov (Almaty)
- Best power forward: (Kazakhstan) Dmitri Gavrilov (Kapchagay)
- Best center: (Austria) Rašid Mahalbašić (Astana)
