= National Basketball Federation of the Republic of Kazakhstan =

Sports regulation body of Kazakhstan

- Sport: Basketball
- Affiliation: FIBA
- Regional affiliation: FIBA Asia
- President: Abay Alpamysov

Official website
- nbf.kz

The National Basketball Federation of the Republic of Kazakhstan is the governing body of the sport of basketball in Kazakhstan. It organises the Kazakhstan Basketball Championship and the Kazakhstan Basketball Cup.

As of April 2025, Abay Alpamysov is the president of the organization. In February 2017, Dimash Dossanov was elected as president of the organization. Alpamysov previously served as president before him.
