= Dmitriy Gavrilov =

Kazakhstani basketball player

Dmitri Gavrilov
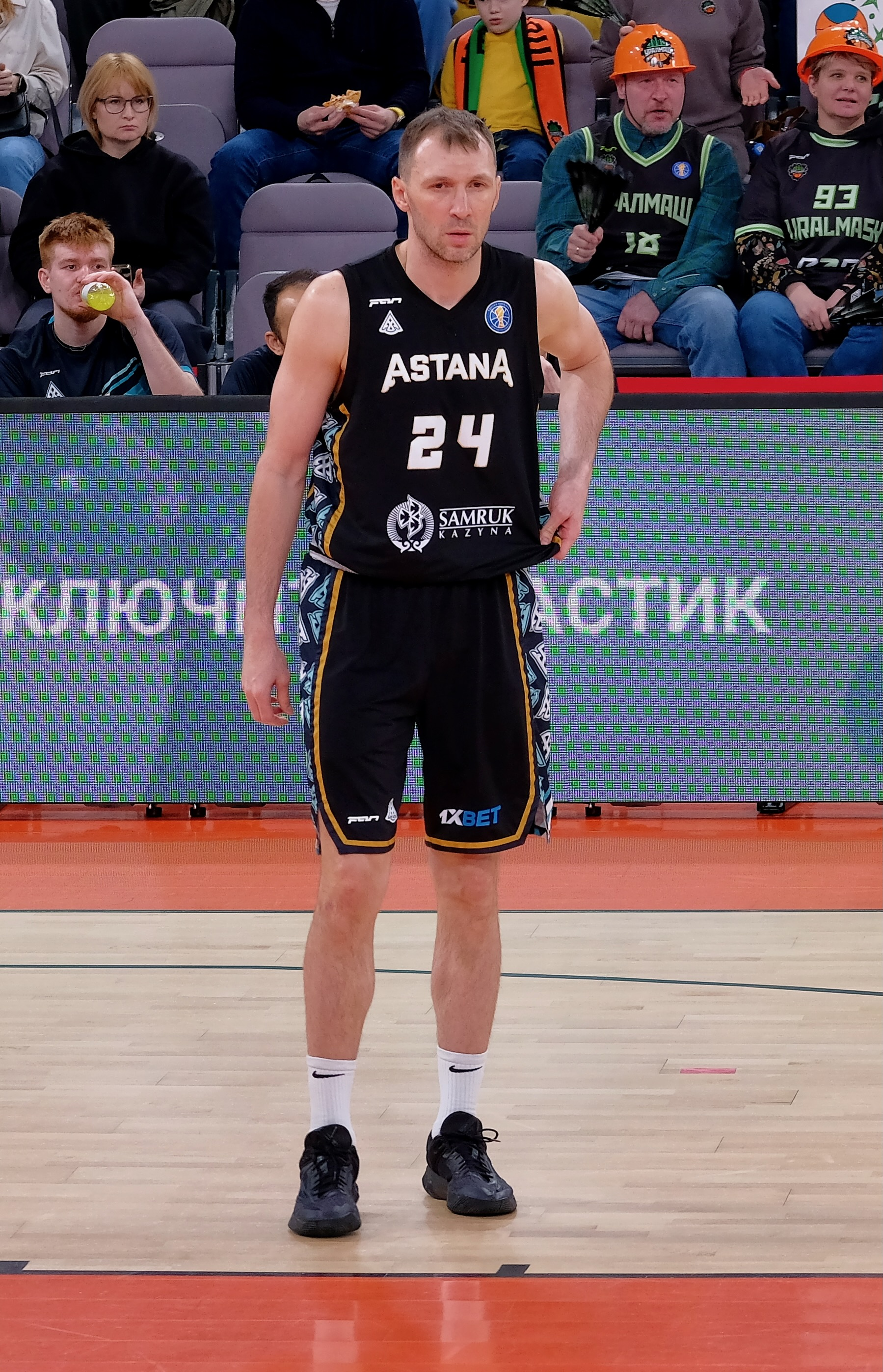

No. 24 – BC Astana
- Position: Power forward
- League: Kazakhstan Championship; VTB United League; FIBA Europe Cup

Personal information
- Born: 27 November 1986 (age 39) Alma-Ata, Kazakhstan
- Listed height: 203 cm (6 ft 8 in)
- Listed weight: 98 kg (216 lb)

Career information
- NBA draft: 2008: undrafted

Career history
- 2006–2008: CSKA Almaty
- 2008–2009: →Barsy Atyrau
- 2009–2011: Astana Tigers
- 2011–2012: Barsy Atyrau
- 2012–2013: Caspiy Aktau
- 2013–2014: Barsy Atyrau
- 2014–2016: Kapchagay
- 2016–present: BC Astana

Career highlights
- All-Kazakhstan championship (2015); Kazakhstan Championship champion (2010)

Dmitri Alexandrovich Gavrilov (Russian: Дмитрий Александрович Гаврилов; born 27 November 1986) is a Kazakhstani professional basketball player. He plays for BC Astana of the Kazakhstan Basketball Championship and the VTB United League.

== Professional career ==
The Alma-Ata native started his career with home town side CSKA Almaty, staying there until 2008 when he was loaned to Barsy Atyrau.

In June 2009 he joined the Astana Tigers, the Kazakhstan Basketball Championship title holders. He played with the side in the 2010 FIBA Asia Champions Cup, scoring 26 points (including 8 in overtime) to help the Kazakhstani's overcome Smart Gilas in the group stage.

After helping the Tigers win another championship, Gavrilov extended his contract for a year in June 2010. He would post 11 points and 7.9 rebounds in the championship during the season.

In June 2011, Gavrilov rejoined Barsy Atyrau for the season, despite reported interest from power house BC Astana. Playing with the side in the Baltic Basketball League, he contributed 6.5 points and 4.3 rebounds in 20 minutes per game.

In July 2012, he moved to Caspiy Aktau.

Rejoining Barsy for 2013–2014, Gavrilov posted 6.2 points and 4.4 rebounds in around 19 minutes on average in the Baltic league.

Whilst playing for Kapchagay, he was selected as the best power forward of the 2014-15 Kazakhstan Basketball Championship, and the 2015 Kazakhstan Basketball Cup.

== International career ==
Gavrilov has played for the Kazakhstan national basketball team. He was part of the squad for the 2007 FIBA Asia Championship but did not play.

In the 2009 FIBA Asia Championship, he had 10.1 points, 6.8 rebounds and 1.5 blocks in 24 minutes per game as Kazakhstan finished 9th.

Gavrilov also participated in the 2014 Asian Games, top-scoring for Kazakhstan in three games, including against champions South Korea and in the bronze medal game against Japan (both losses).
