= Anatoliy Kolesnikov =

Australian-Kazakhstani basketball player

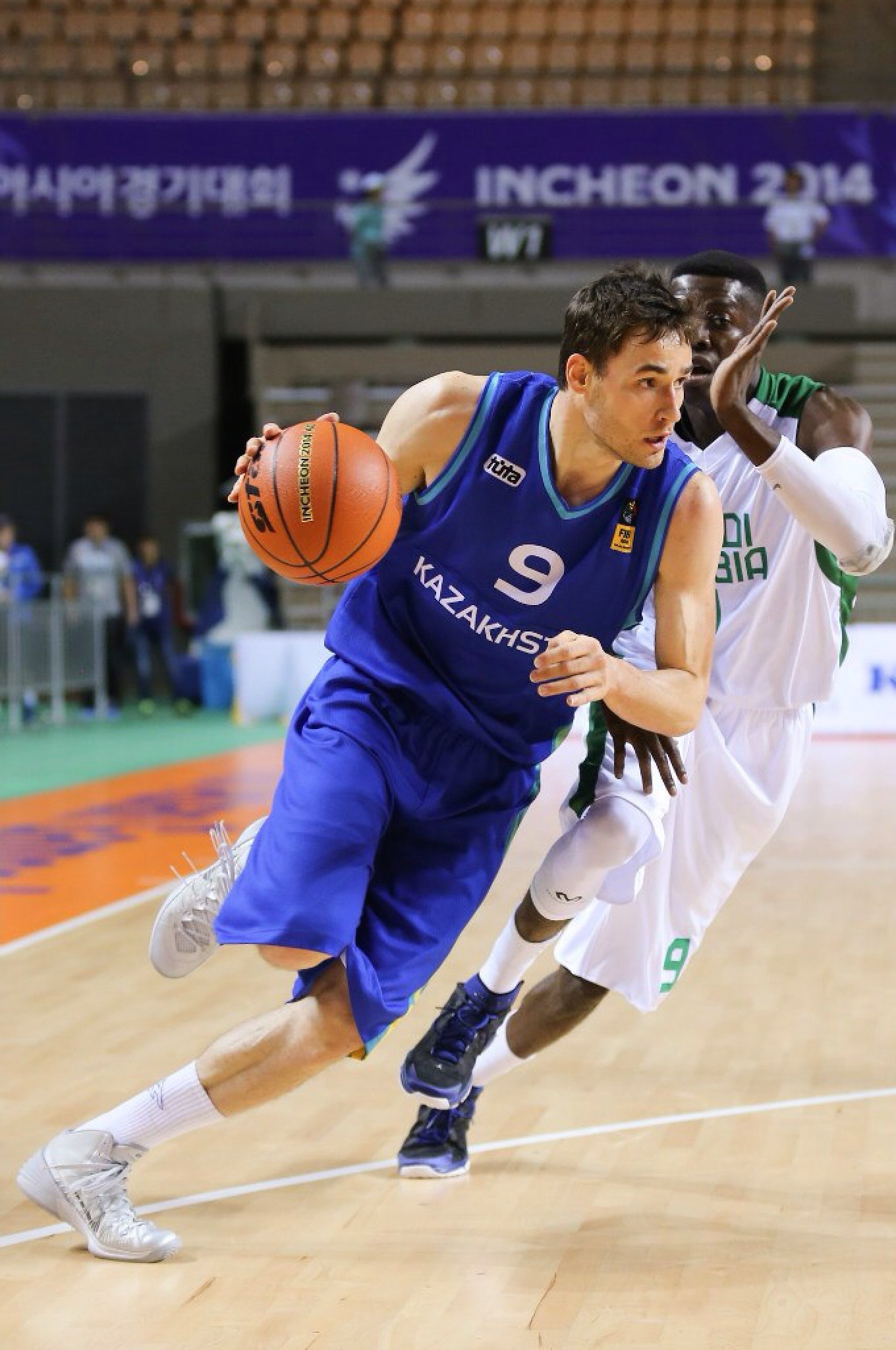
- Kolesnikov with Kazakhstan in 2014

No. 31 – Norths Bears
- Position: Small forward
- League: NBL1 East

Personal information
- Born: 6 December 1988 (age 37) Alma-Ata, Kazakh SSR
- Listed height: 200 cm (6 ft 7 in)
- Listed weight: 91 kg (201 lb)

Career information
- High school: Waverley College (Waverley, New South Wales)
- College: Nicholls State (2007–2011)
- NBA draft: 2011: undrafted
- Playing career: 2006–present

Career history
- 2006–2007: Norths Bears
- 2011–2012: Sydney Kings
- 2012–2016; 2017–2018: Astana
- 2017–present: Norths Bears

Career highlights
- 2× VTB United League Kazakh Player of the Year (2014, 2015); 4× Kazakhstan League champion (2013-2015, 2018); 3× Kazakhstan Cup champion (2013, 2014, 2018); NBL Rookie of the Year (2012); 2× First-team All-Southland (2010, 2011); Third-team All-Southland (2009)

Anatoliy Kolesnikov (born 6 December 1988), formerly known as Anatoly Bose, is an Australian-Kazakhstani professional basketball player for the Norths Bears of the NBL1 East. He played college basketball for Nicholls State University.

== Early life ==
Born as Anatoliy Kolesnikov, he changed his name to Anatoly Bose as a youth. He was born and raised in Alma-Ata in the Kazakh Soviet Socialist Republic (USSR) before moving to Brooklyn, New York City, New York in the United States when he was six. When he was 12 years old, his family relocated to Bondi in Sydney, New South Wales, Australia. He was named to the All-Australian High School squad in 2006 while averaging 22.5 points and 12.8 rebounds per contest in his senior campaign. For his efforts, his team voted him MVP his senior year. He was also selected to play for the All-Australian Under-19 team in 2006, and received invites to the Big Time Tournament in Los Angeles in 2005 and the Nike Basketball Camp in Asia in 2007. An academic honor student in 2006, Bose was one of five players on the team of foreign origin. Bose also helped New South Wales to claim the gold medal at the 2007 Under-20 Australian national championships. In 2006 and 2007, he played in the Waratah League for the Norths Bears.

== College career ==
Bose finished his college career at Nicholls State as one of the most consistent scoring threats in the nation, leading the Southland Conference and ranking eighth among NCAA Division I players with a 22.1 point/game scoring average. Bose also grabbed a team-high 164 rebounds, and averaged 5.9 rebounds/game en route to being named All-Southland Conference First Team and All-Region 23 First Team. After the end of the season, Bose was one of only 64 players invited to the prestigious Portsmouth Invitational Tournament.

Bose scored 20 or more points in 21 of 28 games his senior year, including three games with 30 or more points. Over his four-year career, Bose recorded 50 20-point games, including 41 in his final 58 career games, spanning the final two years of his career. Bose became just the third Colonel in school history to ever surpass the 2,000 career point mark, reaching the milestone on 2 March, before concluding his career with 2,050 points.

He was named the Louisiana Men's Basketball Player of the Year in 2011, a season where he recorded at least 20 points in his 28 games for the Colonels, averaged nearly six rebounds per contest and led his team to victories over traditional college powerhouses LSU and Tulane – two teams Nicholls State had never previously defeated.

== Professional career ==
On 15 June 2011, Bose signed with the Sydney Kings for the 2011–12 NBL season. He went on to win the NBL Rookie of the Year Award after averaging 15.5 points, 6.7 rebounds and 1.5 assists in 25 games.

In August 2012, Bose signed a one-year deal with BC Astana of the Kazakhstan Basketball Championship. In 2013, he changed his name back to Anatoliy Kolesnikov and re-signed with Astana for the 2013–14 season. In July 2014, he again re-signed with the club for the 2014–15 season. In 2014–15, he earned VTB United League Kazakh Player of the Year honours for a second time after averaging 4.9 points and 3.6 rebounds in 33 games.

In July 2015, Kolesnikov re-signed with Astana once again. After sitting out the 2016–17 season, he returned to Astana for the 2017–18 season.

In 2017, Kolesnikov had a two-game stint in the Waratah League for the Norths Bears. He continued on with the Bears in 2018, 2019, 2020 and 2021. In 2022, he played for the Bears in the inaugural NBL1 East season. He returned to the team in 2023.

== National team career ==
In 2014, Kolesnikov represented Kazakhstan at the 2014 Asian Games in Incheon, South Korea, where he averaged 13.9 points and 8.1 rebounds in 10 games. The following year, he represented Kazakhstan at the 2015 FIBA Asia Championship, where he averaged 11.0 points and 5.8 rebounds in six games.

== Personal ==
Kolesnikov is the son of Oleg and Larisa Bose, and has a brother, Vladislav Bose. Kolesnikov married his wife, Yelizaveta Amelicheva, in July 2015.
