= Kazakhstan Basketball Cup =

Kazakh annual basketball cup competition

Kazakhstan Basketball Cup (KBC)
- Sport: Basketball
- Country: Kazakhstan
- Continent: FIBA Asia (Asia)
- Most recent champion: BK Barsy Atyrau (2nd title) (2022)
- Most titles: BC Astana (9 titles)
- Related competitions: Kazakhstan Basketball Championship
- Website: nbf.kz (in Russian)

The Kazakhstan Basketball Cup (Кубка Казахстана по баскетболу) is the national men's professional basketball cup competition in the country of Kazakhstan. It is organised annually over a few days in a single location by the National Basketball Federation Kazakhstan. Its official designation in full is: Basketball Cup of the Republic of Kazakhstan for men's teams Кубка Республика Казахстан по баскетболу среди мужских команд).

== Titles ==
- 2003 Otrar Almaty
- 2004 Astana Tigers
- 2005 Tobol Kostanay
- 2006 Astana Tigers
- 2007 Saba Battery
- 2008 Astana Tigers
- 2009 Barsy Atyrau
- 2010 Astana Tigers
- 2011 BC Astana
- 2012 BC Astana
- 2013 BC Astana
- 2014 BC Astana
- 2015 Almatynski Legion
- 2016 Almatynski Legion
- 2017 BC Astana
- 2018 BC Astana
- 2019 BC Astana
- 2020 BC Astana
- 2021 BC Astana
- 2022 Barsy Atyrau
- 2023 BC Astana
- 2024 BC Astana
- 2025 Barsy Atyrau

== Results ==
The title has been alternatively decided by round-robin or by a single final (see Format and rules).

Round robin format
Edition	1st place	Points (Won/Lost)		Second place	Host city	Date
2003	Otrar Almaty	N/A	N/A	Tobol Kostanay	Almaty	6–10 September
2011	BC Astana	8 (4/0)	7 (3/1)	Barsy Atyrau	Astana	18–22 December
2012	BC Astana	8 (4/0)	7 (3/1)	Tobol Kostanay	Almaty	19–24 March
2013	BC Astana	8 (4/0)	7 (3/1)	Barsy Atyrau	Atyrau	20–24 February

Single final format
Edition	Champion	Score	Finalist	Third place	Host city	Date
2004	Astana Tigers	96 – 75	Bars Petropavl		Almaty	29 October – 1 November
2005	Tobol Kostanay	N/A	Astana Tigers		Almaty	?-5 October
2006	Astana Tigers	74 – 54	Tobol Kostanay		Almaty	15–21 September
2007	Saba Battery	79 – 60	Astana Tigers		Almaty	26 September – 2 October
2008	Astana Tigers	94 – 88	Tobol Kostanay		Kostanay	16 September – 21 September
2009	Barsy Atyrau	66 – 65	Tobol Kostanay		Kostanay	7–11 December
2010	Astana Tigers	64 – 63	Barsy Atyrau		Atyrau	? – 8 October
2014	BC Astana	88 – 76	PBC Kapchagay		Astana	27 February – 3 March
2015	Almatynski Legion	90 – 86	Tobol Kostanay		Almaty	18–22 February
2016	Almatynski Legion	89 – 87	PBC Kapchagay		Almaty	7–11 March
2017	BC Astana	66 – 46	Barsy Atyrau		Atyrau	12 March
2018	BC Astana	72 – 61	Barsy Atyrau		Atyrau	
2019	BC Astana		Tobol		Almaty	
2020	BC Astana	102–66	Tobol	Barsy Atyrau	Nur-Sultan	
2021	BC Astana	92–66	Tobol	Barsy Atyrau	Shchuchinsk	
2022	Barsy Atyrau	Round-robin	BC Astana	Aktobe	N/A	

== Format and rules ==
The cup has been alternatively played in two different formats. A round-robin format, where each team plays the others in the tournament once, with the team in possession of the best record (most points or head-to-head record) declared the winner.

A finals format, the teams are separated in two groups (usually of three teams), where all teams in a group play each other. The last placed teams in each group then play for 5th place whilst the respective first and second place teams compete in the semifinals, with the winners moving on to the final, all single games.

The cup traditionally used to open the season, however from the 2012 edition it was switched nearer to the end of the season (February–March), leading to a strange situation wherein BC Astana won the cup twice in 2011–12.

In the 2015 edition, teams were only allowed to field Kazakhstani players, with foreign players barred.

From 2022, the cup returned to a round-robin format.

== History ==
The 2013 Cup was held on March 19–24 in Almaty between five teams. BC Astana won all four of their games to win the title.

The 2014 Cup was contested between six clubs in Astana in March, BC Astana won the cup again, beating Kapshagay 88–76 in the final.

The 2015 Cup was played from 18 to 22 February in Almaty, six teams participated, though holders BC Astana did not defend their title as they were already playing three matches (two on the road) in other competitions around that period. Almatynski Legion and Tobol Kostanay met in the final, with Almatynski Legion winning the title after a 90–86 victory.

== All-Cup Team ==
The league selects their choice of the best players at each position, forming the tournament team for each edition.

Edition	Point guard	Shooting guard	Small forward	Power forward	Center
2013	(Latvia) Reinis Strupovics (Aktau)	(Serbia) Branko Cvetković (Astana)	(Ukraine) Dmitri Dyatlovsky (Atyrau)	(Kazakhstan) Anton Ponomarev (Astana)	(United States) David Simon (Astana)
2014	(Kazakhstan) Jerry Johnson (Astana)	(Latvia) Jānis Blūms (Astana)	(Latvia) Edgaras Želionis (Atyrau)	(Greece) Pat Calathes (Astana)	(Uzbekistan) Dmitri Sviridov (Kapchagay)
2015	(Kazakhstan) Berik Ismailov (Kapchagay)	(Kazakhstan) Yuriy Kozhanov (Almaty)	(Kazakhstan) Nikolai Bazhin (Kostanay)	(Kazakhstan) Dmitri Gavrilov (Kapchagay)	(Kazakhstan) Vsevolod Fadeikin (Almaty)
2016	(Kazakhstan) Shaim Kuanov (Kostanay)	(Kazakhstan) Yuriy Kozhanov (Almaty)	(Kazakhstan) Konstantin Dvirnyi (Kapchagay)	(Kazakhstan) Anton Bykov (Kapchagay)	(Kazakhstan) Mikhail Evstigneev (Atyrau)
2017	(Kazakhstan) Rustem Murzagaliev	(Kazakhstan) Rustam Ergali	(Kazakhstan) Pavel Ilyin	(Kazakhstan) Anton Ponomarev	(Kazakhstan) Vsevolod Fadeikin

== See also ==
- Kazakhstan Basketball Championship
