= Basketball at the 1994 Asian Games – Men's tournament =

Men at the 1994 Asian Games
- Date: 3–15 October 1994
- Nations: 9

Medalists
| gold medal | China |
| silver medal | South Korea |
| bronze medal | Japan |

The 1994 Men's Asian Games Basketball Tournament was held in Hiroshima from 3 to 15 October 1994.

== Results ==
All times are Japan Standard Time (UTC+09:00)

=== Preliminary round ===
==== Group A ====
| Pos | Team | Pld | W | L | PF | PA | PD | Pts | Qualification |
|---|---|---|---|---|---|---|---|---|---|
| 1 | China | 3 | 3 | 0 | 251 | 207 | +44 | 6 | Semifinals |
| 2 | Japan | 3 | 2 | 1 | 253 | 239 | +14 | 5 | Semifinals |
| 3 | Saudi Arabia | 3 | 1 | 2 | 205 | 228 | −23 | 4 | Classification 5th–8th |
| 4 | Chinese Taipei | 3 | 0 | 3 | 228 | 263 | −35 | 3 | Classification 5th–8th |

Source: Results

3 October
16:00

| Saudi Arabia | 60–71 | China |

Hiroshima

4 October
16:00

| Japan | 89–88 | Chinese Taipei |
Scoring by half: 42–47, 47–41

Hiroshima

6 October
14:00

| Chinese Taipei | 68–92 | China |

Hiroshima

7 October
15:00

| Saudi Arabia | 82–72 | Chinese Taipei |

Hiroshima

8 October
14:00

| Japan | 85–63 | Saudi Arabia |
Scoring by half: 34–33, 51–30

Hiroshima

10 October
18:00

| China | 88–79 | Japan |
Scoring by half: 34–35, 54–44

Hiroshima

==== Group B ====
| Pos | Team | Pld | W | L | PF | PA | PD | Pts | Qualification |
|---|---|---|---|---|---|---|---|---|---|
| 1 | South Korea | 4 | 4 | 0 | 378 | 314 | +64 | 8 | Semifinals |
| 2 | Philippines | 4 | 3 | 1 | 344 | 319 | +25 | 7 | Semifinals |
| 3 | Iran | 4 | 2 | 2 | 321 | 340 | −19 | 6 | Classification 5th–8th |
| 4 | Kazakhstan | 4 | 1 | 3 | 293 | 308 | −15 | 5 | Classification 5th–8th |
| 5 | United Arab Emirates | 4 | 0 | 4 | 295 | 350 | −55 | 4 | |

Source: Results

3 October
16:00

| Philippines | 89–76 | Kazakhstan |
Scoring by half: 48–27, 41–49

Hiroshima

4 October
14:00

| South Korea | 102–78 | Iran |

Hiroshima

5 October
14:00

| Kazakhstan | 72–63 | United Arab Emirates |
Scoring by half: 31–37, 41–26

Hiroshima

6 October
16:00

| Iran | 86–89 | Philippines |
Scoring by half: 45–51, 41–38

Hiroshima

7 October
18:00

| United Arab Emirates | 80–103 | South Korea |

Hiroshima

8 October
16:00

| Kazakhstan | 68–69 | Iran |

Hiroshima

9 October
16:00

| South Korea | 87–77 | Kazakhstan |
Scoring by half: 40–43, 47–34

Hiroshima

9 October
16:00

| United Arab Emirates | 71–87 | Philippines |
Scoring by half: 38–43, 33–44

Hiroshima

10 October
12:00

| Iran | 88–81 | United Arab Emirates |
Scoring by half: 41–50, 47–31

Hiroshima

10 October
16:00

| Philippines | 79–86 | South Korea |
Scoring by half: 47–49, 32–37

Hiroshima

=== Classification 5th–8th ===
Semifinals
12 October
Kazakhstan | 77
Saudi Arabia | 71
12 October
Chinese Taipei | 95
Iran | 90

5th place game
14 October
Kazakhstan | 75
Chinese Taipei | 66
7th place game
14 October
Saudi Arabia | 95
Iran | 87

==== Semifinals ====
12 October
14:00

| Saudi Arabia | 71–77 | Kazakhstan |

Hiroshima

12 October
16:00

| Chinese Taipei | 95–90 | Iran |

Hiroshima

==== 7th place game ====
14 October
16:00

| Saudi Arabia | 95–87 | Iran |

Hiroshima

==== 5th place game ====
14 October
18:00

| Kazakhstan | 75–66 | Chinese Taipei |

Hiroshima

=== Final round ===
Semifinals
13 October
China | 85
Philippines | 74
13 October
Japan | 63
South Korea | 101

Gold medal game
15 October
China | 100
South Korea | 72
Bronze medal game
15 October
Philippines | 76
Japan | 79

==== Semifinals ====
13 October
14:00

| China | 85–74 | Philippines |
Scoring by half: 44–31, 41–43

Hiroshima

13 October
16:00

| Japan | 63–101 | South Korea |
Scoring by half: 28–52, 35–49

Hiroshima

==== Bronze medal game ====
15 October
14:00

| Philippines | 76–79 | Japan |
Scoring by half: 40–34, 36–45

Hiroshima

==== Gold medal game ====
15 October
16:00

| China | 100–72 | South Korea |
Scoring by half: 42–34, 58–38

Hiroshima

== Final standing ==
| Rank | Team | Pld | W | L |
|---|---|---|---|---|
| 1st place, gold medalist(s) | China | 5 | 5 | 0 |
| 2nd place, silver medalist(s) | South Korea | 6 | 5 | 1 |
| 3rd place, bronze medalist(s) | Japan | 5 | 3 | 2 |
| 4 | Philippines | 6 | 3 | 3 |
| 5 | Kazakhstan | 6 | 3 | 3 |
| 6 | Chinese Taipei | 5 | 2 | 3 |
| 7 | Saudi Arabia | 5 | 1 | 4 |
| 8 | Iran | 6 | 2 | 4 |
| 9 | United Arab Emirates | 4 | 0 | 4 |
