= Yuriy Kozhanov =

Kazakh basketball player

BC Almaty
- Position: Guard / forward
- League: Kazakhstan Basketball Championship

Personal information
- Born: 5 January 1990 (age 36) Kapchagay, Kazakhstan
- Listed height: 6 ft 4 in (1.93 m)

Career information
- Playing career: 2007–present

Career history
- 2014–present: Legion Alma-Ata

Yuriy Alexandrovich Kozhanov (Russian: Юрий Александрович Кожанов; born 5 January 1990) is a Kazakh professional basketball player, currently with Legion Alma-Ata of the Kazakhstan Basketball Championship.

He represented Kazakhstan's national basketball team at the 2016 FIBA Asia Challenge in Tehran, Iran.
