= Andres Ortiz =

Puerto Rican basketball player

Andrés Ortiz (c. 1987 in Fajardo, Puerto Rico – 23 May 2015 in Arecibo, Puerto Rico) was a Puerto Rican basketball player who played for the Indios de Mayagüez of the Baloncesto Superior Nacional the professional men's basketball league in Puerto Rico. Popularly known as Andy Ortiz Jr he was also nicknamed "Corky" after his father, a streetball star in his own right. He died at age 28 following a car accident. As part of Team San Juan, alongside his teammates Jonathan García, José López and William Orozco, he won the first world title in the inaugural season of FIBA 3x3 World Tour held in Miami, Florida in September 2012.
