= Zeke Hogeland =

American basketball player and coach

Biographical details
- Born: November 25, 1925; Iowa Falls, Iowa, U.S.
- Died: October 26, 2015 (aged 89); Hot Springs, Arkansas, U.S.

Playing career
- 1946–1949: Northern Iowa
- Position: Guard

Coaching career (HC unless noted)
- 1949–1951: Decorah HS
- 1951–1955: Washington HS
- 1955–1962: Mason City HS/Mason City JC
- 1962–1967: Bemidji State
- 1967–1973: Northern Iowa

Wesley Dean "Zeke" Hogeland (November 25, 1925 – October 26, 2015) was an American college basketball coach, best known for his tenure as head coach at the University of Northern Iowa (UNI).

Hogeland was born in Iowa Falls, Iowa and attended Marshalltown High School in Marshalltown, Iowa. He went to Iowa State Teachers College (now UNI) and played three years of basketball as a guard for head coach Hon Nordly. Upon graduation, he spent several years as a high school and junior college coach in his home state before being named head coach at Bemidji State University in Minnesota in 1963. Hogeland served as head coach of the Beavers from 1963 to 1967, compiling a record of 52–37 (.584). Hogeland was then hired by his alma mater, UNI, to succeed Norm Stewart. He coached the Panthers for six seasons, compiling a record of 70–74.

Hogeland retired to Hot Springs, Arkansas where he died on October 26, 2015.
