= Astana Tigers =

Kazakh basketball club based in Astana

- Leagues: Kazakhstan Higher League
- Founded: 2000
- History: Astana Tigers (2000–present)
- Location: Astana, Kazakhstan
- Team colors: Black, Yellow
- President: Oleg Severgin
- Head coach: Alexander Chernov
- Championships: 6 Domestic Championships; 4 Domestic Cups

Tigers Astana Basketball Club (Kazakh: Zholbarystar Astana Basketbol Kluby) or more commonly Astana Tigers (Kazakh: Astana Zholbarystary) is a Kazakh basketball club based in Astana, Kazakhstan.

Founded in 2000, the club competed in the Kazakhstan Basketball Championship where it won six consecutive titles from 2004 to 2010, also adding four Kazakhstan Basketball Cup titles.

Since 2011 and the inception of rival BC Astana, who have won nearly every domestic trophy each year, the Tigers have seen their standing wane, as of June 2015 they now play in the second division Higher league.

== History ==
Astana Tigers saw the light in 2000, originally they were a youth side, bringing in young players from all over the country, including Anton Ponomarev and Rustam Yargaliev from Kostanay, living in the Olympic reserve school with other athletes.

Starting in 2002–03 the side starting playing in the national first division Kazakhstan Basketball Championship, finishing 8th. Despite having players aged 16–17 years on average (from a 15-year-old Ponomarev to a 19-year-old) the Tigers, coached by first-time coach Vitaly Strebkov, finished third in the 2003–04 championship.

In 2004–05 they did even better, winning their first title, the 2004 Kazakhstan Basketball Cup, and romping to a 3-0 series win to add to the Championship title.

It would be the first of six straight titles in the league for the Tigers, also adding 4 cups during that period.

In 2010, the Kazakhstanis also took part in the FIBA Asia Champions Cup, having participated in 2007 whilst turning down the invitation in 2008. They reached the quarterfinals, winning their final two games to finish a team record 5th.

Their winning streak in the Championship was ended during the 2010–11 season as they lost in the semifinals to perennial runners-up Tobol Kostanay.

The 2011 off season would provide more disappointment, as newly formed side BC Astana poached a number of players from the side in addition to coach Strebkov.

The 2011–12 season would see the Tigers play in the second division Higher league, where they have stayed as of June 2015.

=== Astana Tigers women ===
The women's basketball of the side has inversely kept competing for titles, winning the Kazakhstan Basketball Championship for women as recently as 2015.

== Titles ==
Kazakhstan Basketball Championship:

- 6x champions: 2005, 2006, 2007, 2008, 2009, 2010

Kazakhstan Basketball Cup:

- 4x winners: 2004, 2006, 2008, 2010

== Notable players ==
- (Kazakhstan) Dmitri Gavrilov 2 seasons: '09–'11
- (Russia) Sergei Drozhanov 4 seasons: '04–'08
- (Kazakhstan) Andrei Shpekht 4 seasons: '04–'08
- (Kazakhstan) Egor Biryulin 9 seasons: '02–'11
- (Kazakhstan) Ilya Koptelov 9 seasons: '02–'11
- (Kazakhstan) Artem Skorniakov 9 seasons: '02–'11
- (Kazakhstan) Alexander Tyutyunik 9 seasons: '02–'11
- (Kazakhstan) Maxim Voyeykov 9 seasons: '02–'11
- (Kazakhstan) Rustam Yargaliev 9 seasons: '02–'11
- (Kazakhstan) Anton Ponomarev 8 seasons: '02–'10
