= BC Almaty =

Almaty Legion
- Leagues: Kazakhstan Basketball Championship
- Founded: 2006
- History: BC Almaty (2006–2014); Almaty Legion (2014–present)
- Arena: Sports complex Dostyk
- Location: Almaty, Kazakhstan
- Team colors: White, Blue
- President: Oleg Severgin
- Head coach: Alexander Chernov
- Championships: 1 Domestic Cups
- Website: al-bclegion.kz (in Russian)

Basketball Club "BC" Almaty (Russian: Баскетбольный клуб "БК" Алматы) is a Kazakhstani professional basketball club based in the city of Almaty in southern Kazakhstan.

Founded in 2006, it has played under the name Almaty Legion (Russian: Алматинский легион) since 2014. The club has competed in the Kazakhstan Basketball Championship - losing twice in the championship final – and the Kazakhstan Basketball Cup, which they won in 2015.

For the 2014–15 season, the team also competed in the Russian Basketball Super League, the professional second division league in Russia.

== History ==
BC Almaty was founded in December 2006 by the municipality of Almaty, it was managed by the Department of Physical Culture and Sports of that city. In July 2014, the club became a limited liability partnership, with the municipality selling the totality (100%) of its shares in the club as part of a privatization campaign.

In their first season in the Kazakhstan Basketball Championship in 2007–08, they reached the championship finals, losing to the Astana Tigers.

After the Tigers turned down an invitation to play in the 2008 FIBA Asia Champions Cup, Almaty replaced them. In their first international foray they reached the quarterfinal stage, losing to eventual champions Saba Battery.

In the 2014 off-season, BC Almaty went through a re-branding, changing its name to Almaty Legion (Russian: Алматинский легион), though it retained the former designation as its legal name, also changing its logo. SKA Almaty, who had played in the Soviet league in the 1980s, was merged into BC Almaty to serve as the reserve squad in the second division Higher league under the name Almaty Legion KazNU (Russian: Алматинский Легион КазНУ).

Almaty Legion were accepted into the Russian Basketball Super League, the second division of distant neighbours Russia, to play the 2014–15 season there. They finished dead last of the 16 team league with 2 wins out of 30, though they later beat MBA Moscow in the 15th place playoffs to move up a position.

In February 2015, Legion won their first trophy, the Kazakhstan Basketball Cup, beating Tobol Kostanay 90-86 in the final to win the tournament organised in Almaty. They also reached the final of the 2014–15 Kazakhstan Basketball Championship but were crushed 82-56 by perennial champions BC Astana.

== Titles ==
- Kazakhstan Basketball Cup: winners (2015)

== Current squad ==
Note: Flags indicate national team eligibility at FIBA-sanctioned events. Players may hold other non-FIBA nationalities not displayed.

BC Almaty roster
Players
Coaches

| Pos. | No. | Nat. | Name |
|---|---|---|---|
| PG | 1 | (Kazakhstan) | Zhalgasbek Kadyr |
| G | 3 | (Kazakhstan) | Vadim Fabrikantov |
| G/F | 4 | (Kazakhstan) | Temirlan Dzusunov |
| PG | 5 | (Kazakhstan) | Anuar Shakirov |
| PG | 8 | (Kazakhstan) | Vadim Korzhov |
| G/F | 9 | (Russia) | Andrey Litvinenko |
| PF | 10 | (Kazakhstan) | Igor Tinyaev |
| C | 13 | (Kazakhstan) | Vsevolod Fadeikin |
| F | 14 | (Kazakhstan) | Vyacheslav Ostrosko |
| C | 24 | (Kazakhstan) | Alexander Danilchenko |
| F | 31 | (Kazakhstan) | Nikita Timofeyev |
| C | 41 | (Kazakhstan) | Daniyel Albrant |
| G | 45 | (Kazakhstan) | Yuriy Kozhanov |
| G/F | 47 | (Kazakhstan) | Ruslan Aitkali |

Head coach

(Russia) Nikolaj Tanaseychuk

Legend

- (C) Team captain
- Injured

- Roster
Updated: 14 January 2017

== Notable players ==
To appear in this section a player must have either:

- Set a club record or won an individual award as a professional player.
- Played at least one official international match for his senior national team or one NBA game at any time.

- (Armenia) Amiran Amirkhanov
- (Ukraine) Vyacheslav Bogdanov
