= Mikhail Yevstigneyev =

Russian footballer

Personal information
- Full name: Mikhail Valeryevich Yevstigneyev
- Date of birth: 25 February 1978 (age 48)
- Height: 1.84 m (6 ft 1/2 in)
- Position: Defender

Youth career
- DYuSSh-11 Voskhod Samara

Senior career*
Years	Team	Apps	(Gls)
1995–1996	FC Krylia Sovetov Samara	3	(0)
1996	FC Neftyanik Pokhvistnevo	6	(0)
1998	FC Neftyanik Pokhvistnevo	7	(0)
- * Club domestic league appearances and goals

Mikhail Valeryevich Yevstigneyev (Russian: Михаил Валерьевич Евстигнеев; born 25 February 1978) is a former Russian football player.
