= Nikolai Bazhin =

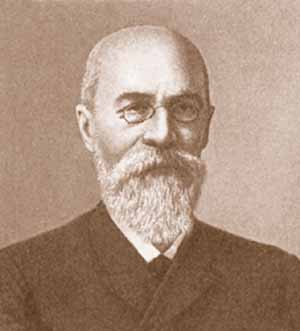
- Born: Николай Федотович Бажин; 5 July 1843; Vyatka, Russian Empire
- Died: 16 October 1908 (aged 65); Sviyazhsk, Kazan Governorate, Russian Empire
- Spouse: Serafima Bazhina

Nikolai Fedotovich Bazhin (Russian: Николай Федотович Бажин; 5 July 1843 – 16 October 1908) was a Russian Empire writer, journalist and critic.

Bazhin contributed initially to Russkoye Slovo, then Delo (where he also published numerous book reviews and was for a while the literary section editor), and later Zhensky Vestnik, Russkoye Bogatstvo, Nablyudatel, Severny Vestnik and Iskra. In each of these he published numerous lengthy novels, arguably the best-known of which, Istoria odnogo tovarishchestva (История одного товарищества, "The History of One People's Society"), stretched over seven issues of Delo in 1869.

Bazhin belonged to the school of harsh social realism usually associated in Russia with the likes of Dmitry Pisarev and Nikolai Chernyshevsky, whose Rakhmetov apparently served as a blueprint for Bazhin's character Stepan Rulyov, who features in several of his earlier novels and stories. The tone of Bazhin's later work radically changed from optimism to dejection and he turned to a completely different type of hero: a disillusioned raznochinets, hard done by harsh Russian reality.

Unusually for such a prolific writer, Bazhin refused to talk or write about himself; therefore, very little is known about his personal life. "The facts of my biography are interesting to nobody and are most certainly unworthy," he replied famously in a letter to Semyon Vengerov, who was working at the time upon this author's entry for the Brockhaus and Efron Encyclopedic Dictionary. Bazhin was married to Serafima Bazhina, the children's writer and translator.
