= BC Barsy Atyrau =

Barsy Atyrau
- Leagues: Balkan League; Kazakhstan Basketball Championship
- Founded: 2003
- History: BC Barsy Atyrau (2003–present)
- Arena: AIROM Arena
- Capacity: 500
- Location: Atyrau, Kazakhstan
- Team colors: Green, White
- President: Bulat Muhambetkaliev
- Head coach: Tigran Gyokchyan
- Championships: 2 Domestic Titles; 2 Domestic Cups
- Website: bcbarsy.kz (in Russian)

Basketball Club "BC" Barsy Atyrau (Russian: Баскетбольный клуб "БК" Барсы Атырау) is a Kazakhstani professional basketball club based in the city of Atyrau in western Kazakhstan.

Founded in 2003, Barsy has competed in the Kazakhstan Basketball Championship, where they were champions in 2011 and 2016, the Kazakhstan Basketball Cup (winning in 2009), and the Baltic Basketball League.

For the 2014–15 season, the team also competed in the Rietumu līga (Western league), a regional basketball league in Latvia.

== History ==
Barsy Atyrau was founded in 2003, with impetus from the Atyrau region Basketball Federation and the Atyrau Board for Tourism and Sports. The Orsk Basketball Federation also provided help, such as sending Leonid Novikov to serve as a coach and adviser.

A women's section was established for the 2007–08 season.

The team won its first trophy in 2009, winning that year's edition of the Kazakhstan Basketball Cup.

In the 2010–11 season, Barsy finished the Kazakhstan Basketball Championship regular season in first place. They then swept Caspiy Aktau in three games, to reach the playoff finals for the first time ever. Pitted against Tobol Kostanay, the previous year's runners-up, they also won the series 3–0, to win their maiden national championship.

Starting from 2010, Barsy also played in the Baltic Basketball League, a regional league with teams from the Baltic states, and some invited countries.

They played the 2010–11 and 2011–12 seasons in the second division Challenge Cup. From 2012–13), all teams were placed inside four groups in one overall division, the Kazakhstanis advanced to the Last 16.

During the 2013–14 season, they advanced from their group to the playoffs with a 5–7 record, losing in the first round to Šiauliai.

In 2013–14, the club reached the Kazakhstan league finals again, however they were comfortably swept in 3 games by title holders Astana.

Barsy played in the Rietumu līga (Western League), a regional basketball league in Latvia during the 2014–15 season. They finished second in the regular season, with a 15–3 record, before reaching the playoff semifinals.

Whilst playing in foreign leagues, Barsy have played all their games on the road.

Barsy won its second Kazakh Cup in 2022.

== Titles ==
- 2x Kazakhstan Basketball Championship: champions (2011, 2016)
- 2x Kazakhstan Basketball Cup: winners (2009, 2022)

== Current squad ==
Note: Flags indicate national team eligibility at FIBA-sanctioned events. Players may hold other non-FIBA nationalities not displayed.

BC Barsy Atyrau roster
Players
Coaches

Pos.	No.	Nat.	Name	Ht.	Wt.	Age
SG	0	(Kazakhstan)	Oralbekov, Akylbek	1.86 m (6 ft 1 in)	72 kg (159 lb)	22 – 25 July 2002
SG	13	(Kazakhstan)	Tauken, Rahat	1.85 m (6 ft 1 in)	70 kg (154 lb)	23 – 8 April 2002
C	8	(Kazakhstan)	Ivanov, Vladimir	2.08 m (6 ft 10 in)	98 kg (216 lb)	30 – 30 November 1994
PF	95	(Kazakhstan)	Tangiyev, Timur	1.95 m (6 ft 5 in)	77 kg (170 lb)	22 – 3 April 2003
PG	3	(United States)	Jarvis, Garett	1.85 m (6 ft 1 in)	79 kg (174 lb)	30 – 13 May 1995
PG	5	(Russia)	Yermakov, Alexander	1.93 m (6 ft 4 in)	83 kg (183 lb)	20 – 13 February 2005
SG	55	(Kazakhstan)	Rabchenyuk, Bogdan	1.88 m (6 ft 2 in)	63 kg (139 lb)	22 – 11 March 2003
SF	74	(Kazakhstan)	Uapov, Merey	1.85 m (6 ft 1 in)	85 kg (187 lb)	24 – 16 June 2000
PF	11	(United States)	Gregg, Jamaure	2.01 m (6 ft 7 in)	100 kg (220 lb)	25 – 3 September 1999
PF	14	(United States)	Hendrix, Vante	1.95 m (6 ft 5 in)	90 kg (198 lb)	27 – 23 May 1998
PF	34	(Kazakhstan)	Kazimov, Mahambet	1.95 m (6 ft 5 in)	72 kg (159 lb)	21 – 30 December 2003
C	77	(Kazakhstan)	Samsin, Ramazan	2.00 m (6 ft 7 in)	80 kg (176 lb)	22 – 8 November 2002

Head coach

(Armenia) Tigran Gyokchyan

Assistant coach(es)

(Kazakhstan) Lyssyak Alexander

Physiotherapist(s)

(Kazakhstan) Bauyrzhan Mahambet

Team manager

(Latvia) Vasiliev Juris

Legend

- (C) Team captain
- Injured

- Roster
Updated: 1 January 2019

== Notable players ==
To appear in this section a player must have either:

- Set a club record or won an individual award as a professional player.
- Played at least one official international match for his senior national team or one NBA game at any time.

- (Kazakhstan) Aleksei Backih
- (Kazakhstan) Leonid Bondarovich
