= BC Astana =

Professional basketball team in Astana, Kazakhstan

- Leagues: Kazakhstan Championship; West Asia Super League
- Founded: 2011; 15 years ago
- History: BC Astana (2011–present)
- Arena: Saryarka Velodrome (capacity: 10,000); Zhekpe-zhek (capacity: 5,000)
- Location: Astana, Kazakhstan
- Team colors: Black, blue
- President: Samson Arakelyan
- Head coach: Miodrag Rajković
- Championships: 10 Domestic titles 9 Domestic cups
- Website: pbcastana.kz/en
Home	Away

Astana Basketball Club (Kazakh: Astana Basketbol Kluby), commonly referred to as BC Astana, is a Kazakh professional basketball club that is based in Astana, Kazakhstan. Founded in 2011, it has competed in the Kazakhstan Basketball Championship and the VTB United League, obtaining many domestic titles in the process.

== History ==
BC Astana was created in March 2011, with the aim of competing in the VTB United League. Valery Tikhonenko was chosen as the team's general director. There were doubts expressed by other clubs in the VTB United League, about whether or not the club would be a good addition to the competition, due to the lack of basketball tradition in Kazakhstan; but the side answered all the admission requirements, including their budget, stadium (a revamped Saryarka Velodrome) and the proximity of hotels, and an international airport. The side received the totality of its funding from the Samruk-Kazyna sovereign wealth fund.

They would sign a number of Kazakhstani players from successful side Astana Tigers, also recruiting their head coach, Vitaly Strebkov, to serve as the team's assistant coach.

In their first season in the VTB United regional league, the team from Kazakhstan won 7 games out of 16 during 2011–12 regular season, including games against strong sides, such as Žalgiris and the defending title holders, Khimki, nearly reaching the playoffs. They had more success on the domestic front, winning the Kazakhstani national domestic league championship, and the Kazakhstani Cup.

The team became a part of the Astana Presidential Club multi-sports club, when it was formed in December 2012.

== Arenas ==
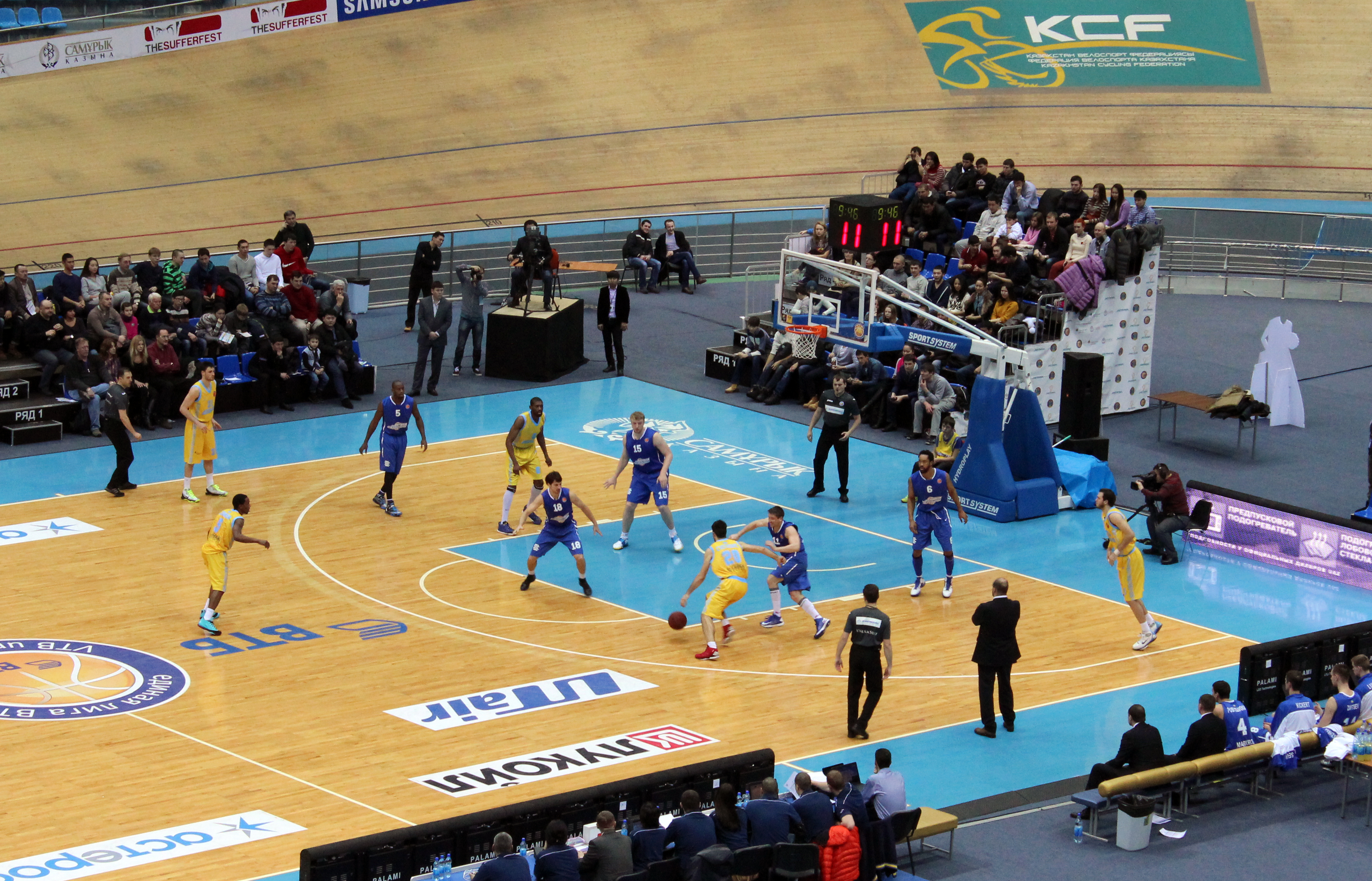
BC Astana vs. BC Azovmash, VTB United League regular season game in 2014, at Saryarka Velodrome.

BC Astana plays its home basketball games at the Saryarka Velodrome, which has a seating capacity of 10,000 people for basketball games.

== Logos ==
Logo (2011–2017)

Logo (2017–2022)

Logo (2022–present)

== Players ==
=== Current roster ===
Note: Flags indicate national team eligibility at FIBA-sanctioned events. Players may hold other non-FIBA nationalities not displayed.

BC Astana roster
Players
Coaches

Pos.	No.	Nat.	Name	Ht.	Wt.	Age
PG	2	(United States)	Johnson, Markell	1.88 m (6 ft 2 in)	85 kg (187 lb)	27 – 25 August 1998
PG	3	(Kazakhstan)	Murzagaliyev, Rustam	1.90 m (6 ft 3 in)	84 kg (185 lb)	34 – 24 May 1992
F	7	(United States)	Davis, Devin	1.98 m (6 ft 6 in)	104 kg (229 lb)	31 – 29 March 1995
G	9	(Kazakhstan)	Chsherbak, Vadim	1.94 m (6 ft 4 in)	88 kg (194 lb)	33 – 24 May 1993
F	11	(United States)	Skipper-Brown, Jordan	1.99 m (6 ft 6 in)	102 kg (225 lb)	28 – 7 January 1998
F	21	(Kazakhstan)	Marchuk, Roman	1.95 m (6 ft 5 in)	85 kg (187 lb)	33 – 26 March 1993
C	24	(Kazakhstan)	Gavrilov, Dmitriy	2.04 m (6 ft 8 in)	94 kg (207 lb)	39 – 27 November 1986
SF	25	(Kazakhstan)	Marchuk, Maxim	1.98 m (6 ft 6 in)	88 kg (194 lb)	32 – 17 January 1994
C	35	(Russia)	Kanygin, Igor	2.07 m (6 ft 9 in)	110 kg (243 lb)	32 – 30 June 1994
SF	47	(Kazakhstan)	Aitkali, Ruslan	1.95 m (6 ft 5 in)	96 kg (212 lb)	28 – 19 December 1997
C	55	(Kazakhstan)	Maidekin, Askar	2.03 m (6 ft 8 in)	99 kg (218 lb)	29 – 28 May 1997

Head coach

- (Greece) Fotis Takianos

Assistant coach(es)

- (United States) Dean Medan

Team manager

- (Kazakhstan) Rustem Mukanov

Legend

- (C) Team captain
- Injured

- Roster
Updated: October 2, 2023

=== Depth chart ===
Pos.	Starting 5	Bench
C	Dmitriy Gavrilov	Askar Maidekin
PF	Devin Davis	Igor Kanygin
SF	Maxim Marchuk	Ruslan Aitkali
SG	Roman Marchuk	Vadim Chsherbak
PG	Rustam Murzagaliyev	Markell Johnson

== Season by season ==
Season	Domestic competitions				Kazakhstani Cup	Regional competitions			Continental competitions		
Season	Tier	League	Pos.	Postseason	Kazakhstani Cup	League	Pos.	Result	Tier	League	Result
2011–12	1	KBC	1	Champion	Winner (x2)	VTB	7	—N/a	DNP		
2012–13	1	KBC	1	Champion	Winner	VTB	5	1R	DNP		
2013–14	1	KBC	1	Champion	Winner	VTB	5	1R	DNP		
2014–15	1	KBC	1	Champion	DNP	VTB	8	QF	3	FIBA EuroChallenge	T16
2015–16	1	KBC	2	Runners-up	DNP	VTB	15	—N/a	3	FIBA Europe Cup	RS
2016–17	1	KBC	1	Champion	Winner	VTB	8	QF	DNP		
2017–18	1	KBC	1	Champion	Winner	VTB	10	—N/a		FIBA Asia Champions Cup	Bronze
2018–19	1	KBC	1	Champion	Winner	VTB	6	QF	DNP		
2019–20	1	KBC	1	Champion	DNP	VTB	9	—N/a	DNP		
2020–21	1	KBC	1	Champion	Winner	VTB	12	—N/a		FIBA Asia Champions Cup	
2021–22	1	KBC	1	Champion		VTB	10	—N/a	DNP		

== Trophies and awards ==
- FIBA Asia Champions Cup:
  - Bronze (1): 2017
- West Asia Super League
  - Bronze medal (1): 2022–23
- Kazakhstan Basketball Championship:
  - Winner (11): 2012, 2013, 2014, 2015, 2017, 2018, 2019, 2020, 2021, 2022, 2023
- Kazakhstan Basketball Cup:
  - Winner (11): 2011, 2012, 2013, 2014, 2017, 2018, 2019, 2020, 2021, 2022, 2023

== Head coaches ==
- (Italy) Matteo Boniciolli: (2011–13)
- (Serbia) Aleksandar Trifunović: (2013–15)
- (Lithuania) Ramūnas Butautas: (2015–16)
- (Greece) Ilias Papatheodorou: (2016–17)
- (Greece) Kostas Flevarakis: (2017–2018)
- (Russia) Mikhail Karpenko: (2018)
- (North Macedonia) Emil Rajković: (2018–2021)
- (Serbia) Darko Ruso: (2021–2022)
- (Serbia) Dejan Parežanin: (2022)
- (Russia) Oleg Kisilev: (2022–2024)
- (Greece) Fotis Takianos: (2024–present)

== Notable players ==
To appear in this section a player must have either:

- Set a club record or won an individual award as a professional player.
- Played at least one official international match for his senior national team.

- (Austria) Rašid Mahalbašić
- (Greece) Leonidas Kaselakis
- (Greece) Dimitrios Katsivelis
- (Kazakhstan) Dmitriy Gavrilov
- (Kazakhstan) Rustam Murzagaliyev
- (Kazakhstan) Anton Ponomarev
- (Kazakhstan) Anatoliy Kolesnikov
- (Latvia) Jānis Blūms
- (Latvia) Ojārs Siliņš
- (Serbia) Ivan Paunić
- (United States) Justin Carter
- (United States) (Kazakhstan) Anthony Clemmons
- (United States) (Kazakhstan) Jerry Johnson
- (United States) Adonis Thomas
- (United States) Isaiah Whitehead
