= Kazakhstan Basketball Championship =

National sports league

Kazakhstan Basketball Championship (KBC)
- Sport: Basketball
- No. of teams: 6
- Country: Kazakhstan
- Continent: FIBA Asia (Asia)
- Most recent champions: BC Caspiy Aktau (1st title) (2025–26)
- Most titles: BC Astana (12 titles)
- Qualification: FIBA West Asia Super League
- Level on pyramid: 1
- Relegation to: Higher League
- Related competitions: Kazakhstan Basketball Cup

The Kazakhstan Basketball Championship (Russian: Чемпионата Казахстана по баскетболу, romanized: Chempionata Kazakhstana po basketbolu) is the highest professional basketball league in Kazakhstan, organised by the National Basketball Federation Kazakhstan.

Kazakhstan is a member of FIBA Asia, as the country lies partly in Asia, and Kazakhstan Championship sides have played in the competitions such as the FIBA Asia Champions Cup and the West Asia Super League. However, the country also partly lies in Europe, and the league's teams have participated in FIBA Europe competitions such as the FIBA EuroChallenge and the FIBA Europe Cup. The league's clubs therefore are also eligible, and often compete, in the Eastern European regional leagues such as the Baltic League and the VTB United League.

== Champions ==
Season	Champion	Finalist	Final result
2003–04	Tobol Kostanay	Otrar Almaty	101–87
2004–05	Astana Tigers	Tobol Kostanay	3–0
2005–06	Astana Tigers (2)	Tobol Kostanay	3–2
2006–07	Astana Tigers (3)	Tobol Kostanay	3–0
2007–08	Astana Tigers (4)	BC Almaty	3–1
2008–09	Astana Tigers (5)	Tobol Kostanay	2–0
2009–10	Astana Tigers (6)	Tobol Kostanay	2–0
2010–11	Barsy Atyrau	Tobol Kostanay	3–0
2011–12	Astana	Barsy Atyrau	3–0
2012–13	Astana (2)	Barsy Atyrau	3–0
2013–14	Astana (3)	Barsy Atyrau	3–0
2014–15	Astana (4)	Almaty Legion	81–56
2015–16	Barsy Atyrau (2)	Astana	3–0
2016–17	Astana (5)	Barsy Atyrau	94–78
2017–18	Astana (6)	Barsy Atyrau	3–0
2018–19	Astana (7)	Barsy Atyrau	2–0
2019–20	Astana (8)	Barsy Atyrau	N/A
2020–21	Astana (9)	Barsy Atyrau	3–0
2021–22	Astana (10)	Barsy Atyrau	3–0
2022–23	Astana (11)	Barsy Atyrau	3–0
2023–24	Irbis-Alatau	Barsy Atyrau	3–1
2024–25	Astana (12)	Irbis-Alatau	3–0
2025–26	BC Caspiy Aktau	Astana	3–2
