= USA Today All-USA High School Football Team (1990–1999) =

American football award

USA Today named its first All-USA High School Football Team in 1982. The newspaper has named a team every year since 1982.

In addition, two members of the team are named the USA Today High School Offensive Player and Defensive Player of the Year, respectively. The newspaper also selects a USA Today High School Football Coach of the Year.

== Teams ==
=== 1990 team ===
Coach of the Year: Tim Reynolds (Eisenhower High School, Lawton, Oklahoma)

Note: Bold denotes Offensive and Defensive Players of the Year, respectively, and ^{‡} denotes high school juniors

Offense

Player	Position	School	Hometown	College
**Marquette Smith**	**Running back**	**Lake Howell High School**	Winter Park, Florida	Florida State/Central Florida
Eric Zeier	Quarterback	Marietta High School	Marietta, Georgia	Georgia
Napoleon Kaufman	Running back	Lompoc High School	Lompoc, California	Washington
Stephen Pitts	Running back	South High School	Middletown, New Jersey	Penn State
Scott Stratton	Offensive line	Lakota West High School	West Chester, Ohio	Penn State
John Horn	Offensive line	Catholic Academy	Joliet, Illinois	Illinois
Pat Kesi	Offensive line	Farrington High School	Honolulu, Hawaii	Washington
Scott Joslyn	Offensive line	Evans High School	Orlando, Florida	Florida
Robert Loya	Offensive line	Fontana High School	Fontana, California	USC
Mike Miller	Wide receiver	Willowridge High School	Sugar Land, Texas	Notre Dame
Phillip Riley	Wide receiver	Jones High School	Orlando, Florida	Florida State
David DeArmas	Placekicker	DeMatha High School	Hyattsville, Maryland	Connecticut

Defense

Player	Position	School	Hometown	College
**Derrick Brooks**	**Linebacker**	**Washington High School**	Pensacola, Florida	Florida State
Trent Zenkewicz	Defensive line	St. Ignatius High School	Cleveland, Ohio	Michigan
Pat Riley	Defensive line	Archbishop Shaw High School	Marrero, Louisiana	Miami (FL)
Greg Wilkins	Defensive line	Vocational Academy	Chicago, Illinois	Oklahoma/Langston
Jason Layman	Defensive line	Sevier County High School	Sevierville, Tennessee	Tennessee
Sam Adams	Defensive line	Cypress Creek High School	Houston, Texas	Texas A&M
Huntley Bakich	Linebacker	W. T. White High School	Dallas, Texas	Notre Dame
Jamir Miller	Linebacker	El Cerrito High School	El Cerrito, California	UCLA
Rodney Young	Defensive back	Ruston High School	Ruston, Louisiana	LSU
Basil Shabazz	Defensive back	Pine Bluff High School	Pine Bluff, Arkansas	Arkansas–Pine Bluff
Deollo Anderson	Defensive back	Ursuline High School	Youngstown, Ohio	Michigan
Derwin Jeffcoat	Punter	Hannah-Pamplico High School	Pamplico, South Carolina	South Carolina

=== 1991 team ===
Coach of the Year: Gary Guthrie (LaGrange High School, LaGrange, Georgia)

Note: Bold denotes Offensive and Defensive Players of the Year, respectively, and ^{‡} denotes high school juniors

Offense

Player	Position	School	Hometown	College
**Stephen Davis**	**Running back**	**Spartanburg High School**	Spartanburg, South Carolina	Auburn
Tommie Frazier	Quarterback	Manatee High School	Bradenton, Florida	Nebraska
Shawn Walters	Running back	Lamar High School	Arlington, Texas	USC
Robert Davis	Running back	Homewood High School	Birmingham, Alabama	LSU
Marcus Long	Offensive line	Mainland High School	Daytona Beach, Florida	Florida State
Korey Stringer	Offensive line	Harding High School	Warren, Ohio	Ohio State
Reggie Green	Offensive line	Southeast High School	Bradenton, Florida	Florida
Jeff Buckey	Offensive line	Bakersfield High School	Bakersfield, California	Stanford
Will Lyell	Offensive line	Brandon High School	Brandon, Mississippi	Notre Dame
David LaFleur	Tight end	Westlake High School	Westlake, Louisiana	LSU
Amani Toomer	Wide receiver	De La Salle High School	Concord, California	Michigan
Eric Abrams	Placekicker	Country Day School	La Jolla, California	Stanford

Defense

Player	Position	School	Hometown	College
**Dexter Daniels**	**Linebacker**	**Valdosta High School**	Valdosta, Georgia	Florida
Scott Freeney	Defensive line	Clarke Central High School	Athens, Georgia	Syracuse
Ceasar O'Neal	Defensive line	Huntsville High School	Huntsville, Texas	Miami (FL)
Marcus Jones	Defensive line	Southwest Onslow High School	Jacksonville, North Carolina	North Carolina
Kendrick Burton	Defensive line	Hartselle High School	Hartselle, Alabama	Alabama
Anthony Jones	Defensive line	Richards High School	Oak Lawn, Illinois	Notre Dame
Greg Jones	Linebacker	Kennedy High School	Denver, Colorado	Colorado
Randall Godfrey	Linebacker	Lowndes County High School	Valdosta, Georgia	Georgia
Tamarick Vanover	Defensive back	Leon High School	Tallahassee, Florida	Florida State
Bobby Taylor	Defensive back	Longview High School	Longview, Texas	Notre Dame
Ron Nealy	Defensive back	Glen Mills Schools	Concordville, Pennsylvania	South Carolina
John Stonehouse	Punter	Loyola High School	Los Angeles, California	USC

=== 1992 team ===
Coach of the Year: George Curry (Berwick High School, Berwick, Pennsylvania)

Note: Bold denotes Offensive and Defensive Players of the Year, respectively, and ^{‡} denotes high school juniors

Offense

Player	Position	School	Hometown	College
**Ron Powlus**	**Quarterback**	**Berwick High School**	Berwick, Pennsylvania	Notre Dame
Randy Kinder	Running back	East Lansing High School	East Lansing, Michigan	Notre Dame
James Allen	Running back	Wynnewood High School	Wynnewood, Oklahoma	Oklahoma
Jay Graham	Running back	Concord High School	Concord, North Carolina	Tennessee
Eric Anderson	Offensive line	Southeast High School	Lincoln, Nebraska	Nebraska
Chris Ruhman	Offensive line	Nimitz High School	Houston, Texas	Texas A&M
Mike Doughty	Offensive line	Lakeville High School	Lakeville, Minnesota	Notre Dame
Willie Anderson	Offensive line	Vigor High School	Prichard, Alabama	Auburn
Chris Kurpeikis	Offensive line	Central Catholic High School	Pittsburgh, Pennsylvania	Notre Dame/Michigan
Maurice Mebane	Wide receiver	Cummings High School	Burlington, North Carolina	Jones County CC
Andre Cooper	Wide receiver	Fletcher High School	Neptune Beach, Florida	Florida State
Carl McCullough	Athlete	Cretin-Derham Hall High School	St. Paul, Minnesota	Wisconsin
Scott Bentley	Placekicker	Overland High School	Aurora, Colorado	Florida State

Defense

Player	Position	School	Hometown	College
**Jammi German**	**Defensive back**	**Fort Myers High School**	Fort Myers, Florida	Miami (FL)
Travis Kirschke	Defensive line	Esperanza High School	Anaheim, California	UCLA
Donnie Embra	Defensive line	Elsik High School	Alief, Texas	Oklahoma
Eric Dotson	Defensive line	Pascagoula High School	Pascagoula, Mississippi	Mississippi State
Julian Pittman	Defensive line	Niceville High School	Niceville, Florida	Florida State
Terry Scott	Defensive line	Apopka High School	Apopka, Florida	Coffeyville CC
Dulayne Morgan	Linebacker	Elizabeth High School	Elizabeth, New Jersey	Syracuse
Melvin Dansby	Linebacker	Ensley High School	Birmingham, Alabama	Notre Dame
Daryl Bush	Linebacker	Lake Brantley High School	Altamonte Springs, Florida	Florida State
Clarence Thompson	Defensive back	King High School	Detroit, Michigan	Michigan State
Tony Blevins	Defensive back	Rockhurst High School	Kansas City, Missouri	Kansas
Justin McBride	Punter	Globe High School	Globe, Arizona	Junior College

=== 1993 team ===
Coach of the Year: Chuck Kyle (St. Ignatius High School, Cleveland, Ohio)

Note: Bold denotes Offensive and Defensive Players of the Year, respectively, and ^{‡} denotes high school juniors

Offense

Player	Position	School	Hometown	College
**Josh Booty**	**Quarterback**	**Evangel Christian Academy**	Shreveport, Louisiana	LSU
George Lombard	Running back	The Lovett School	Atlanta, Georgia	Atlanta Braves (Baseball)
Fred Beasley	Running back	Lee High School	Montgomery, Alabama	Auburn
Delon Washington	Running back	Kimball High School	Dallas, Texas	USC
Jarvis Reado	Offensive line	Archbishop Shaw High School	Marrero, Louisiana	Tennessee
Bo Barzilauskas	Offensive line	South High School	Bloomington, Indiana	Indiana
Eric Gohlstin	Offensive line	St. Ignatius High School	Cleveland, Ohio	Ohio State
Floyd Wedderburn	Offensive line	Upper Darby High School	Upper Darby Township, Pennsylvania	Penn State
Tony Coats	Offensive line	South Kitsap High School	Port Orchard, Washington	Washington
Marcus Nash	Wide receiver	Edmond High School	Edmond, Oklahoma	Tennessee
Ahndre Patterson	Wide receiver	Carter High School	Dallas, Texas	Texas Tech/Alcorn State
Greg Williams	Athlete	Bolingbrook High School	Bolingbrook, Illinois	North Carolina
Wade Richey	Placekicker	Carencro High School	Lafayette, Louisiana	LSU

Defense

Player	Position	School	Hometown	College
**Lamont Green**	**Linebacker**	**Southridge High School**	Miami, Florida	Florida State
Deshaan Simmons	Defensive line	Duluth High School	Duluth, Georgia	Georgia Tech
Darrell Russell	Defensive line	St. Augustine High School	San Diego, California	USC
Orlando Pace	Defensive line	Sandusky High School	Sandusky, Ohio	Ohio State
Grant Wistrom	Defensive line	Webb City High School	Webb City, Missouri	Nebraska
Travis Stroud	Defensive line	Dunwoody High School	Dunwoody, Georgia	Georgia
Rasheed Simmons	Linebacker	Edison High School	Edison, New Jersey	Maryland
Vernon Rollins	Linebacker	Hackensack High School	Hackensack, New Jersey	Iowa
Amp Campbell	Defensive back	Riverview High School	Sarasota, Florida	Michigan State
Robert Hammond	Defensive back	Opelousas High School	Opelousas, Louisiana	Florida State
Eric Thigpen	Defensive back	Thornridge High School	Dolton, Illinois	Iowa
Bret Hopkins	Punter	Bend High School	Bend, Oregon	Oregon State

=== 1994 team ===
Coach of the Year: Bruce Rollinson (Mater Dei High School, Santa Ana, California)

Note: Bold denotes Offensive and Defensive Players of the Year, respectively, and ^{‡} denotes high school juniors

Offense

Player	Position	School	Hometown	College
**Dan Kendra**	**Quarterback**	**Catholic High School**	Bethlehem, Pennsylvania	Florida State
Ahman Green	Running back	Central High School	Omaha, Nebraska	Nebraska
Shaun Alexander	Running back	Boone County High School	Florence, Kentucky	Alabama
D'Andre Hardeman	Running back	North Shore High School	Houston, Texas	Texas A&M
Tim Ridder	Offensive line	Creighton Prep School	Omaha, Nebraska	Notre Dame
Mike Rosenthal	Offensive line	Penn High School	Mishawaka, Indiana	Notre Dame
Matt Stinchcomb	Offensive line	Parkview High School	Lilburn, Georgia	Georgia
Brandon Houston	Offensive line	Taylor High School	Katy, Texas	Texas A&M
Mike Flaar	Offensive line	Oswego High School	Oswego, Illinois	Illinois
Corey Jones	Wide receiver	Conestoga Valley High School	Lancaster, Pennsylvania	Penn State
Randy Moss	Wide receiver	DuPont High School	Dupont City, West Virginia	Marshall
Kevin Faulk	Athlete	Carencro High School	Lafayette, Louisiana	LSU
Chris Sailer	Placekicker	Notre Dame High School	Sherman Oaks, California	UCLA

Defense

Player	Position	School	Hometown	College
**Kory Minor**	**Linebacker**	**Bishop Amat High School**	La Puente, California	Notre Dame
Ernie Badeaux	Defensive line	John Curtis High School	River Ridge, Louisiana	Florida/Nicholls State
Jimmy Friday	Defensive line	Willowridge High School	Sugar Land, Texas	Notre Dame
Takeo Spikes	Defensive line	Washington County High School	Sandersville, Georgia	Auburn
Jerry Wisne	Defensive line	Jenks High School	Jenks, Oklahoma	Notre Dame
Corey Simon	Defensive line	Ely High School	Pompano Beach, Florida	Florida State
Brandon Short	Linebacker	McKeesport High School	McKeesport, Pennsylvania	Penn State
Martavius Houston	Linebacker	Boyd H. Anderson High School	Lauderdale Lakes, Florida	Auburn
R. W. McQuarters	Defensive back	Booker T. Washington High School	Tulsa, Oklahoma	Oklahoma State
Daylon McCutcheon	Defensive back	Bishop Amat High School	La Puente, California	USC
Charles Woodson	Defensive back	Ross High School	Fremont, Ohio	Michigan
Robert Stevenson	Punter	Manatee High School	Bradenton, Florida	Florida

=== 1995 team ===
Coach of the Year: Bob Ladouceur (De La Salle High School, Concord, California)

Note: Bold denotes Offensive and Defensive Players of the Year, respectively, and ^{‡} denotes high school juniors

Offense

Player	Position	School	Hometown	College
**Tim Couch**	**Quarterback**	**Leslie County High School**	Hyden, Kentucky	Kentucky
Sedrick Irvin	Running back	Miami High School	Miami, Florida	Michigan State
Patrick Pass	Running back	Tucker High School	Tucker, Georgia	Georgia
Ron Dayne	Running back	Overbrook Regional High School	Pine Hill, New Jersey	Wisconsin
Chad Ward	Offensive line	River View High School	Finley, Washington	Washington
Zac Zedalis	Offensive line	Santa Fe High School	Alachua, Florida	Florida
Travis Claridge	Offensive line	Fort Vancouver High School	Vancouver, Washington	USC
Al Jackson	Offensive line	Moss Point High School	Moss Point, Mississippi	LSU
Jeff Backus	Offensive line	Norcross High School	Norcross, Georgia	Michigan
Rufus French	Tight end	Amory High School	Amory, Mississippi	Mississippi
Titcus Pettigrew	Wide receiver	West Forsyth High School	Clemmons, North Carolina	Penn State
Kevin Harvey	Athlete	Paulsboro High School	Paulsboro, New Jersey	Temple
Courtney Leavitt	Placekicker	Germantown High School	Germantown, Tennessee	South Carolina

Defense

Player	Position	School	Hometown	College
**Andy Katzenmoyer**	**Linebacker**	**South High School**	Westerville, Ohio	Ohio State
Jason Ching	Defensive line	Punahou School	Honolulu, Hawaii	Notre Dame
Eric Jefferson	Defensive line	Evangel Christian Academy	Shreveport, Louisiana	Illinois
Derrion Yates	Defensive line	Booker T. Washington High School	Houston, Texas	UTEP/Tarleton State
Brad Williams	Defensive line	Mater Dei High School	Santa Ana, California	Notre Dame
Jesse Warren	Defensive line	Carter High School	Dallas, Texas	Colorado
Courtney Brown	Linebacker	Macedonia High School	Moncks Corner, South Carolina	Penn State
Buck Gurley	Linebacker	Godby High School	Tallahassee, Florida	Florida
Mike Burden	Defensive back	Palatine High School	Palatine, Illinois	Ohio State
Dwayne Goodrich	Defensive back	Richards High School	Oak Lawn, Illinois	Tennessee
Tommy Hendricks	Defensive back	Eisenhower High School	Houston, Texas	Michigan
David Leaverton	Punter	Midland High School	Midland, Texas	Tennessee

=== 1996 team ===
Coach of the Year: Bruce Rollinson (Mater Dei High School, Santa Ana, California)

Note: Bold denotes Offensive and Defensive Players of the Year, respectively, and ^{‡} denotes high school juniors

Offense

Player	Position	School	Hometown	College
**Travis Minor**	**Running back**	**Catholic High School**	Baton Rouge, Louisiana	Florida State
Ronald Curry^{‡}	Quarterback	Hampton High School	Hampton, Virginia	North Carolina
Jasper Sanks	Running back	Carver High School	Columbus, Georgia	Georgia
Tony Driver	Running back	Louisville Male High School	Louisville, Kentucky	Notre Dame
Tam Hopkins	Offensive line	Lake Howell High School	Winter Park, Florida	Ohio State
Victor Rogers	Offensive line	Decatur High School	Federal Way, Washington	Colorado
Jason Brooks	Offensive line	St. Ignatius High School	Cleveland, Ohio	West Virginia
Leonard Davis	Offensive line	Wortham High School	Wortham, Texas	Texas
Kareem McKenzie	Offensive line	Willingboro High School	Willingboro, New Jersey	Penn State
Steve Shipp	Wide receiver	West Charlotte High School	Charlotte, North Carolina	Florida/North Carolina A&T
Ken-Yon Rambo	Wide receiver	Poly High School	Long Beach, California	Ohio State
Billy-Dee Greenwood	Athlete	King Low Heywood Thomas	Stamford, Connecticut	North Carolina
Sebastian Janikowski	Placekicker	Seabreeze High School	Daytona Beach, Florida	Florida State

Defense

Player	Position	School	Hometown	College
**David Warren**	**Defensive line**	**John Tyler High School**	Tyler, Texas	Florida State
Thomas Pittman	Defensive line	East St. John High School	Reserve, Louisiana	Auburn
Cosey Coleman	Defensive line	Southwest DeKalb High School	Decatur, Georgia	Tennessee
Maurice Williams	Defensive line	Pershing High School	Detroit, Michigan	Michigan
Andre Carter	Defensive line	Oak Grove High School	San Jose, California	California
Hubert Thompson	Linebacker	Proviso West High School	Hillside, Illinois	Michigan State
Grant Irons	Linebacker	The Woodlands High School	The Woodlands, Texas	Notre Dame
Ron Graham	Linebacker	Penn Hills High School	Pittsburgh, Pennsylvania	Penn State
Deon Grant	Defensive back	Josey High School	Augusta, Georgia	Tennessee
James Boyd	Defensive back	Indian River High School	Chesapeake, Virginia	Penn State
Derrick Gibson	Defensive back	Killian High School	Miami, Florida	Florida State
Toby Sheers	Punter	Lake County High School	Leadville, Colorado	Mesa State

=== 1997 team ===
Coach of the Year: Thom McDaniels (McKinley High School, Canton, Ohio)

Note: Bold denotes Offensive and Defensive Players of the Year, respectively, and ^{‡} denotes high school juniors

Offense

Player	Position	School	Hometown	College
**Ronald Curry**	**Quarterback**	**Hampton High School**	Hampton, Virginia	North Carolina
Mike McNair	Running back	Mater Dei High School	Santa Ana, California	Notre Dame
Benjamin Gay	Running back	Spring High School	Spring, Texas	Baylor
Justin Fargas	Running back	Notre Dame High School	Sherman Oaks, California	Michigan/USC
Mike Pearson	Offensive line	Armwood High School	Seffner, Florida	Florida
Brett Williams	Offensive line	Osceola High School	Kissimmee, Florida	Florida State
Jon Stinchcomb	Offensive line	Parkview High School	Lilburn, Georgia	Georgia
Antwan Kirk-Hughes	Offensive line	Waxahachie High School	Waxahachie, Texas	Texas
Mike Saffer	Offensive line	Sabino High School	Tucson, Arizona	UCLA
Marquise Walker	Wide receiver	Henninger High School	Syracuse, New York	Michigan
R. J. Luke	Wide receiver	Waubonsie Valley High School	Aurora, Illinois	Penn State
David Terrell	Athlete	Huguenot High School	Richmond, Virginia	Michigan
Travis Dorsch	Placekicker	Bozeman High School	Bozeman, Montana	Purdue

Defense

Player	Position	School	Hometown	College
**Dennis Johnson**	**Defensive line**	**Harrodsburg High School**	Harrodsburg, Kentucky	Kentucky
John Henderson	Defensive line	Pearl-Cohn High School	Nashville, Tennessee	Tennessee
Ken Kocher	Defensive line	Patrick Henry High School	San Diego, California	UCLA
Ryan Pickett	Defensive line	Zephyrhills High School	Zephyrhills, Florida	Ohio State
Matt Leonard	Defensive line	Palmdale High School	Palmdale, California	Stanford
Kindal Moorehead	Linebacker	Melrose High School	Memphis, Tennessee	Alabama
Shamar Finney	Linebacker	Crest High School	Shelby, North Carolina	Penn State
Robert Thomas	Linebacker	Imperial High School	Imperial, California	UCLA
Lovell Houston	Defensive back	Thomas Jefferson High School	Denver, Colorado	Colorado
Chris Hope	Defensive back	Rock Hill High School	Rock Hill, South Carolina	Florida State
Clifford Jefferson	Defensive back	Carter High School	Dallas, Texas	Notre Dame
Drew Henson	Punter	Brighton High School	Brighton, Michigan	Michigan

=== 1998 team ===
Coach of the Year: Bob Ladouceur (De La Salle High School, Concord, California)

Note: Bold denotes Offensive and Defensive Players of the Year, respectively, and ^{‡} denotes high school juniors

Offense

Player	Position	School	Hometown	College
**Chris Simms**	**Quarterback**	**Ramapo High School**	Franklin Lakes, New Jersey	Texas
Nick Maddox	Running back	A. L. Brown High School	Kannapolis, North Carolina	Florida State
Dontae Walker	Running back	Clinton High School	Clinton, Mississippi	Mississippi State
Paul Arnold	Running back	Kennedy High School	Burien, Washington	Washington
Kevin Breedlove	Offensive line	Daniel High School	Central, South Carolina	Georgia
Vernon Carey	Offensive line	Northwestern High School	Miami, Florida	Miami (FL)
Tony Pape	Offensive line	Hinsdale South High School	Darien, Illinois	Michigan
Jeff Faine	Offensive line	Seminole High School	Sanford, Florida	Notre Dame
Bryce Bishop	Offensive line	Killian High School	Miami, Florida	Ohio State
Reggie Brown	Wide receiver	Carrollton High School	Carrollton, Georgia	Georgia
Mike Seidman	Wide receiver	Westlake High School	Westlake Village, California	UCLA
Anquan Boldin	Athlete	Pahokee High School	Pahokee, Florida	Florida State
Tomas Sanchez	Placekicker	Arlington Heights High School	Fort Worth, Texas	Midwestern State

Defense

Player	Position	School	Hometown	College
**Cory Redding**	**Linebacker**	**North Shore High School**	Houston, Texas	Texas
David Paine	Defensive line	Melrose High School	Memphis, Tennessee	Alabama
Darnell Dockett	Defensive line	Paint Branch High School	Burtonsville, Maryland	Florida State
Cedric Hilliard	Defensive line	Lamar High School	Arlington, Texas	Notre Dame
Bernard Riley	Defensive line	Los Alamitos High School	Los Alamitos, California	USC
Albert Haynesworth	Defensive line	Hartsville High School	Hartsville, South Carolina	Tennessee
Kendyll Pope	Linebacker	Columbia High School	Lake City, Florida	Florida State
T. J. Duckett	Linebacker	Loy Norrix High School	Kalamazoo, Michigan	Michigan State
Lito Sheppard	Defensive back	Raines High School	Jacksonville, Florida	Florida
Gerome Sapp	Defensive back	Lamar High School	Houston, Texas	Notre Dame
Darrell Rideaux	Defensive back	Poly High School	Long Beach, California	USC
Nick Setta	Punter	Lockport High School	Lockport, Illinois	Notre Dame

=== 1999 team ===
Coach of the Year: John Parchman (Lee High School, Midland, Texas)

Note: Bold denotes Offensive and Defensive Players of the Year, respectively, and ^{‡} denotes high school juniors

Offense

Player	Position	School	Hometown	College
**Brock Berlin**	**Quarterback**	**Evangel Christian Academy**	Shreveport, Louisiana	Florida/Miami (FL)
Marcus Houston	Running back	Thomas Jefferson High School	Denver, Colorado	Colorado/Colorado State
Albert Hollis	Running back	Christian Brothers High School	Sacramento, California	Georgia
Michael Muñoz	Offensive line	Moeller High School	Cincinnati, Ohio	Tennessee
Shannon Snell	Offensive line	Hillsborough High School	Tampa, Florida	Florida
Wes Sims	Offensive line	Weatherford High School	Weatherford, Oklahoma	Oklahoma
Kwame Harris	Offensive line	Newark High School	Newark, Delaware	Stanford
Sean Young	Offensive line	Northwest Whitfield High School	Tunnel Hill, Georgia	Tennessee
Charles Rogers	Wide receiver	Saginaw High School	Saginaw, Michigan	Michigan State
B. J. Johnson	Wide receiver	South High School	Grand Prairie, Texas	Texas
Dominique Sims	Athlete	De La Salle High School	Minneapolis, Minnesota	Minnesota
Phillip Yost	Placekicker	Auburn High School	Auburn, Alabama	Auburn

Defense

Player	Position	School	Hometown	College
**D. J. Williams**	**Linebacker**	**De La Salle High School**	Concord, California	Miami (FL)
Mac Tyler	Defensive line	Jess Lanier High School	Bessemer, Alabama	Alabama
Anthony Bryant	Defensive line	Sunshine High School	Newbern, Alabama	Alabama
Darrell Lee	Defensive line	Kirkwood High School	Kirkwood, Missouri	Florida
Travis Johnson	Defensive line	Notre Dame High School	Sherman Oaks, California	Florida State
Greg Pauly	Defensive line	South High School	Waukesha, Wisconsin	Notre Dame
Albert Means	Linebacker	Trezevant High School	Memphis, Tennessee	Alabama, Memphis
Marko Cooper	Linebacker	Cass Tech High School	Detroit, Michigan	Ohio State
Lawrence Richardson	Defensive back	Ball High School	Galveston, Texas	Arkansas
Bryant McFadden	Defensive back	McArthur High School	Hollywood, Florida	Florida State
Matt Grootegoed	Defensive back	Mater Dei High School	Santa Ana, California	USC
Chris Kluwe	Punter	Los Alamitos High School	Los Alamitos, California	UCLA
