= Calathes =

Calathes (Greek: Καλάθης) is a Greek surname. Notable people with the surname include:

- Nick Calathes (born 1989), Greek-American basketball player in the National Basketball Association, brother of Pat Calathes
- Pat Calathes (born 1985), Greek-American basketball player, brother of Nick Calathes
