= Jim Benkert =

American football coach (born 1958)

Jim Benkert (born January 31, 1958) is an American high school football coach who has held head coaching positions at Westlake High School, Oaks Christian High School, and Simi Valley High School in California. During his tenure at Westlake High School, Benkert led the football team to four CIF Southern Section championships in 1999, 2003, 2009, and 2011. In 2015, he transitioned to Oaks Christian, where he led the team to a CIF Southern Section (division II) title in 2017. In 2018, he was hired by Simi Valley, where he led the school to a CIF Southern Section (division six) title in 2023. Many of his former players have advanced to college and professional football careers, including Zach Charbonnet, Mike Seidman, Greg Newman, Rudy Carpenter, Billy Miller, Nelson Spruce among others.

== Education and early career ==
Benkert was born in Inglewood, California, he earned his B.A. from California State University, Northridge (CSUN) in 1982, attended California Lutheran University in 1990, and completed an M.A. from Grand Canyon University in 2000. He began coaching football at Crespi High School as an assistant. In 1989, he became the head coach at Westlake High School.

== Awards and recognition ==
In December 2023, Benkert was named the Los Angeles Times High School Football Coach of the Year, recognizing his achievements at Simi Valley and his overall contributions to high school football in Southern California. In addition to his coaching accolades, Benkert was inducted into the Ventura County Sports Hall of Fame, which honors individuals who have made significant contributions to sports in Ventura County. Throughout his career, Benkert has received several coaching awards, including multiple Ventura County Coach of the Year honors and recognition as the CIF Southern Section Coach of the Year. Benkert has over three hundred career wins.
