= Willie Jones (defensive lineman, born 1957) =

American football player (born 1957)

No. 90
- Position: Defensive end

Personal information
- Born: November 22, 1957 (age 68); Dublin, Georgia, U.S.
- Listed height: 6 ft 4 in (1.93 m)
- Listed weight: 240 lb (109 kg)

Career information
- High school: South Dade (FL)
- College: Florida State
- NFL draft: 1979: 2nd round, 42nd overall pick

Career history
- Oakland Raiders (1979–1981)

Awards and highlights
- Super Bowl champion (XV); Second-team All-American (1978); Florida State Seminoles Hall of Fame

Career NFL statistics
- Sacks: 17
- Fumble recoveries: 3
- Touchdowns: 2
- Stats at Pro Football Reference

Willie Lorenzo Jones (born November 22, 1957) is an American former professional football player who was a defensive end in the National Football League (NFL). He played college football for the Florida State Seminoles and was selected by the Oakland Raiders in the second round of the 1979 NFL draft.

Jones was inducted into the Florida State Seminoles Hall of Fame in 1988.

== College career ==
Jones played college football at Florida State University from 1975 to 1978. During his career he recorded 20 sacks and was an All-American as a senior. He was the defensive MVP of the 1977 Tangerine Bowl and MVP of the 1979 Senior Bowl.

== Professional career ==
Jones was drafted by the Oakland Raiders in the second round of the 1979 NFL draft. He played three years for the team from 1979 to 1981 and led the team in sacks as a rookie with 10. He was also a member of the Raiders Super Bowl XV victory over the Philadelphia Eagles.

== Personal ==
Married to Tarralyn Jones, CEO TJ's Designs & Events, 2x breast cancer survivor, brain tumor survivor, motivational speaker, and author (book Release February 2021) ~ "Living A Masked Life". His son, Christian, played college football at Florida State and in the NFL for the Bears
