= Nandi Pryce =

American soccer player (born 1982)

Personal information
- Full name: Nandi Tyi Pryce
- Date of birth: May 30, 1982 (age 44)
- Place of birth: Jersey City, New Jersey, U.S.
- Height: 5 ft 10 in (1.78 m)
- Position: Defender

Youth career
- Team Boca
- Klein Challenge SC
- –2000: Lake Howell Silver Hawks

College career
Years	Team	Apps	(Gls)
2000–2003	UCLA Bruins	66	(1)

International career
1999	United States U16		
1999	United States U18		
1999	United States U21		
2000	United States	8	(0)

Managerial career
- 2004: UCLA Bruins (assistant)
Medal record
Women's football
Representing United States
Pan American Games
Gold medal – first place	1999 Winnipeg	Team

Nandi Tyi Pryce (born May 30, 1982) is an American former soccer player who played as a defender, making eight appearances for the United States women's national team.

== Career ==
Pryce played for the Lake Howell Silver Hawks of Winter Park, Florida in high school, where she was a two-time Parade and NSCAA All-American, as well as the Parade National Defender of the Year in her senior season. She also played club soccer for Team Boca in Miami and Klein Challenge Soccer Club, and competed in track and field in her freshman and sophomore years. In college, she played for the UCLA Bruins from 2000 to 2003. In 2002 and 2003, she was an NSCAA and Soccer Buzz All-American, as well as a Soccer America MVP. She received NSCAA and Soccer Buzz All-Region honors in both years as well, being selected as the Soccer Buzz West Region and Pac-10 Player of the Year as a senior. She was included in the NCAA All-Tournament Team in 2003, as well as the All-Pac-10 selection second team in 2001 and first team in 2002 and 2003. In total, Pryce scored 1 goal and recorded 7 assists in 66 appearances for the Bruins.

Pryce appeared for the under-16, under-18, and under-21 U.S. national teams. She helped the under-18 team win the gold medal against senior national teams at the 1999 Pan American Games in Winnipeg, Canada, and won the Nordic Cup in 2000 and 2002 with the under-21 team. Pryce made her international debut for the United States on January 7, 2000 in the 2000 Australia Cup against the Czech Republic. In total, she made eight appearances for the U.S., earning her final cap on July 7, 2000 in a friendly match against Italy.

In 2004, Pryce suffered a broken leg, which halted her soccer career. Later that year she served as an undergraduate assistant coach for the UCLA Bruins. She was inducted into the UCLA Athletics Hall of Fame in 2013.

== Personal life ==
Pryce was born in Jersey City, New Jersey, though she grew up in Irvington, New Jersey and Casselberry, Florida. Her brother, Trevor Pryce, is a former American football player who played fourteen seasons in the NFL.

== Career statistics ==
=== International ===
United States
Year	Apps	Goals
2000	8	0
Total	8	0
