= 2015–16 Kazakhstan Basketball Championship =

Kazakhstan Basketball Championship
- Season: 2015–16
- Duration: 15 November 2015 – 9 May 2016
- Games played: 120
- Teams: 12 (5 in the regular season)

Finals
- Champions: BC Barsy Atyrau; 2nd title
- Runners-up: BC Astana
- Semifinalists: PBC Kapchagay; Caspiy Aktau

The 2015–16 Kazakhstan Basketball Championship (Russian: Чемпионата Казахстана по баскетболу сезон 2015–16) was the 24th season of the Kazakhstan Basketball Championship, the highest professional basketball league in Kazakhstan. Its official designation in full was: XXIVth basketball Championship of the Republic of Kazakhstan for men's teams (National league) (Russian: XXIV-го Чемпионата Республика Казахстан по баскетболу среди мужских команд (Национальной лиги)).

The regular season ran from 15 January to 3 April 2016. 5 teams played 16 games each, with 8 confrontations between every side.

The playoffs ran from 13 April to 13 May 2016, BC Barsy Atyrau won their second consecutive title by beating BC Astana in the final.

== Teams ==
=== Qualifying stage ===
Location of teams of the 2015–16 Kazakhstan Basketball League. Qualifying stage.

Team	Russian name	City	Arena
Almatynski Legion	ПБК Алматинский легион	Almaty	Sports complex Dostyk
Astana Tigers	Тигры Астаны	Astana	Saryarka Velodrome
Caspiy Aktau	БК Каспий Актау	Aktau	Sports complex Caspiy
PBC Kapchagay	ПБК Капшагай	Kapchagay	Sports palace Jastar
Bars Petropavl	БК Барс Петропавловск	Petropavl	Sport complex Zhenis
Barsy Atyrau	БК Барсы Атырау	Atyrau	Sports and recreation complex Atyrau
Barsy Atyrau-2	БК Барсы Атырау-2	Atyrau	Sports and recreation complex Atyrau
Irtysh Pavlodar	БК Иртыш Павлодар	Pavlodar	Central Stadium sport complex
Kazygurt Shymkent	БК Казыгурт Шымкент	Shymkent	Sports and recreation complex Shymkent
Okzhetpes Kokshetau	БК Окжетпес Кокшетау	Kokshetau	Sport complex Kokshetau
Tobol Kostanay	БК Тобол Костанай	Kostanay	Akimat of Kostanay Sport Palace

=== Regular season ===
Location of teams of the 2015–16 Kazakhstan Basketball League.

Team	Russian name	City	Arena
Almatynski Legion	ПБК Алматинский легион	Almaty	Sports complex Dostyk
BC Astana	БК Астана	Astana	Saryarka Velodrome
Caspiy Aktau	БК Каспий Актау	Aktau	Sports complex Caspiy
PBC Kapchagay	ПБК Капшагай	Kapchagay	Sports palace Jastar
Barsy Atyrau	БК Барсы Атырау	Atyrau	Sports and recreation complex Atyrau

== Qualifying stage ==
Pos	Teams	P	W	L	Pts	
1	BC Barsy Atyrau	11	11	0	22	Qualification to Regular season
2	BC Caspiy Aktau	11	10	1	21	Qualification to Regular season
3	BC Tobol Kostanay	11	10	1	21	
4	Almatynski Legion	11	7	4	18	Qualification to Regular season
5	PBC Kapchagay	11	7	4	18	Qualification to Regular season
6	BC Kazygurt Shymkent	11	7	4	18	
7	BC Barsy Atyrau-2	11	4	7	15	
8	BC Bars Petropavl	11	4	7	15	
9	Astana Tigers	11	2	9	13	
10	BC Irtysh Pavlodar	11	2	9	13	
11	BC Tobol Kostanay-2	11	2	9	13	
12	BC Okzhetpes Kokshetau	11	1	11	12	

== Regular season ==
Pos	Teams	P	W	L	Pts	
1	BC Barsy Atyrau	16	14	2	30	Qualification to Play-offs
2	BC Astana	16	12	4	28	Qualification to Play-offs
3	PBC Kapchagay	16	7	9	23	Qualification to Play-offs
4	Caspiy Aktau	16	4	12	20	Qualification to Play-offs
5	Almatynski Legion	16	3	13	19	

== Play-offs ==
Semifinals
1	BC Astana	3
3	Caspiy Aktau	0
2	PBC Kapchagay	0
3	Barsy Atyrau	3

Finals
1	BC Astana	0
3	Barsy Atyrau	3

=== Semifinals ===
==== (2) Astana vs. (3) Caspiy Aktau ====
April 13
18:00

Boxscore

Astana 75, Caspiy Aktau 73
Scoring by quarter: 23–22, 12–22, 25–9, 15–20
Pts: Aleksandr Zhigulin 16; Rebs: Anton Ponomarev; Patrick Calathes 10; Asts: Pavel Ilin; Rustam Murzagaliev 5	Pts: Zhanysh Erns Uulu 23; Rebs: Maxim Smirnov 9 Asts: Dyami Starks; Zhanysh Erns Uulu 5
Astana leads series, 1–0

Saryarka Velodrome, Astana
Attendance: 569
Referees: Matevos Nikogosyan, Alexey Stepanenko, Evgeniy Miheev

April 14
17:00

Boxscore

Astana 78, Caspiy Aktau 70
Scoring by quarter: 21–13, 19–19, 22–12, 16–26
Pts: Patrick Calathes 15; Rebs: Pavel Ilin 9 Asts: Patrick Calathes 9	Pts: Zhanysh Erns Uulu 16; Rebs: Maxim Smirnov 8 Asts: Zhanysh Erns Uulu 5
Astana leads series, 2–0

Saryarka Velodrome, Astana
Attendance: 233
Referees: Matevos Nikogosyan, Alexey Stepanenko, Evgeniy Miheev

April 17
17:00 PM

Boxscore

Caspiy Aktau 71, Astana 83
Scoring by quarter: 14–29, 30–15, 11–23, 16–16
Pts: Azim Yagodkin 21; Rebs: Azim Yagodkin; Sergei Kazantsev; Maxim Smirnov 5 Asts: Azim Yagodkin; Maxim Smirnov 6	Pts: Anton Ponomarev; Patrick Calathes 19; Rebs: Patrick Calathes 11; Asts: Pavel Ilin; Rustam Murzagaliev; Patrick Calathes 3
Astana wins series, 3–0

Sport complex Caspiy, Aktau
Referees: Matevos Nikogosyan, Alexey Stepanenko, Evgeniy Miheev

==== (1) BC Barsy Atyrau vs. (4) PBC Kapchagay ====
April 13
19:00

Boxscore

Barsy Atyrau 80, Kapchagay 75
Scoring by quarter: 22–19, 18–21, 17–21, 23–14
Pts: Michael Burvel 22; Rebs: Michael Burvel 11; Asts: 0	Pts: Mykhailo Galenko 17; Rebs: Anton Bykov 13; Asts: 0
Barsy Atyrau leads series, 1–0

Sports and recreation complex Atyrau, Atyrau
Referees: Arsen Andryushkin

April 14
19:00

Boxscore

Barsy Atyrau 91, Kapchagay 88
Scoring by quarter: 23–19, 21–28, 25–24, 22–17
Pts: Ryan Cook 23; Rebs: Dmitri Gavrilov 12; Asts: 0	Pts: Vadim Matyukevich 24; Rebs: Anton Bykov 7 Asts: 0
Barsy Atyrau leads series, 2–0

Sports and recreation complex Atyrau, Atyrau
Referees: Arsen Andryushkin

April 16
18:00

Boxscore

Barsy Atyrau 91, Kapchagay 60
Scoring by quarter: 21–10, 20–17, 24–13, 26–20
Pts: Ryan Cook 18; Rebs: Ryan Cook 9 Asts: 0	Pts: Vadim Matyukevich 16; Rebs: Anton Bykov 8 Asts: 0
Barsy Atyrau wins series, 3–0

Sports and recreation complex Atyrau, Atyrau
Referees: Arsen Andryushkin

== Third place game ==
=== Caspiy Aktau vs. PBC Kapchagay ===
April 23
17:00

Boxscore

Caspiy Aktau 86, Kapchagay 73
Scoring by quarter: 34–15, 16–19, 18–20, 18–19
Pts: Dyami Starks 22; Rebs: Dyami Starks 9 Asts: Dyami Starks 5	Pts: Maxim Voeykov 19; Rebs: Anton Bykov 13; Asts: Konstantin Dvirnyi 3
Caspiy Aktau leads series, 1–0

Sport complex Caspiy, Aktau
Referees: Matevos Nikogosyan, Alexey Stepanenko, Evgeniy Miheev

April 24
17:00

Boxscore

Caspiy Aktau 90, Kapchagay 82 (OT)
Scoring by quarter: 16–24, 27–17, 15–24, 18–11, Overtime: 14–6
Pts: Azim Yagodkin 18; Rebs: Sergei Kazantsev; Maxim Smirnov 8 Asts: Azim Yagodkin 7	Pts: Vadim Matyukevich 22; Rebs: Vadim Matyukevich 14; Asts: Vitali Kupenkov; Daniil Seleznev; Maxim Voeykov 2
Caspiy Aktau leads series, 2–0

Sport complex Caspiy, Aktau
Referees: Matevos Nikogosyan, Alexey Stepanenko, Evgeniy Miheev

April 26
18:00 PM

Boxscore

Kapchagay 69, Caspiy Aktau 67
Scoring by quarter: 16–21, 20–14, 15–24, 18–8
Pts: Vadim Matyukevich 18; Rebs: Vadim Matyukevich 11; Asts: Daniil Seleznev 6	Pts: Dyami Starks 15; Rebs: Maxim Smirnov 9 Asts: Azim Yagodkin 5
Caspiy Aktau leads series, 2–1

Sport palace Jastar, Taldykorgan
Referees: Matevos Nikogosyan, Alexey Stepanenko, Evgeniy Miheev

April 27
16:00 PM

Boxscore

Kapchagay 103, Caspiy Aktau 102 (OT)
Scoring by quarter: 18–33, 16–16, 19–19, 30–15, Overtime: 20–19
Series tied, 2–2

Sport palace Jastar, Taldykorgan
Referees: Matevos Nikogosyan, Alexey Stepanenko, Evgeniy Miheev

April 30
17:00

Boxscore

Caspiy Aktau 77, Kapchagay 82
Scoring by quarter: 20–22, 14–16, 28–24, 15–20
Pts: Dyami Starks 15; Rebs: Maxim Smirnov 9 Asts: Maxim Smirnov 4	Pts: Vadim Matyukevich 25; Rebs: Anton Bykov 16; Asts: Vyacheslav Raguev; Daniil Seleznev; Maxim Voeykov 2
Kapchagay wins series, 3–2

Sport complex Caspiy, Aktau
Referees: Matevos Nikogosyan, Alexey Stepanenko, Evgeniy Miheev

== Final ==
=== BC Barsy Atyrau vs. BC Astana ===
April 28
19:00

Boxscore

Barsy Atyrau 87, Astana 67
Scoring by quarter: 20–22, 17–16, 30–19, 20–10
Pts: Mikhail Evstigneev; Ryan Cook 19; Rebs: Michael Burvel 10; Asts: 0	Pts: Jerry Johnson 15; Rebs: Aleksei Zhukanenko; Anton Ponomarev 8 Asts: 0
Barsy Atyrau leads series, 1–0

Sports and recreation complex Atyrau, Atyrau
Referees: Matevos Nikogosyan, Alexey Stepanenko, Evgeniy Miheev

April 29
20:00

Boxscore

Barsy Atyrau 90, Astana 88 (OT)
Scoring by quarter: 90–88, 90–88, 90–88, 90–88, Overtime: 90-88
Barsy Atyrau leads series, 2–0

Sports and recreation complex Atyrau, Atyrau
Referees: Matevos Nikogosyan, Alexey Stepanenko, Evgeniy Miheev

May 3
18:00

Boxscore

Astana 73, Barsy Atyrau 82
Scoring by quarter: 25–20, 16–20, 9–22, 23–20
Pts: Jerry Johnson; Aleksei Zhukanenko 15; Rebs: Anton Ponomarev 9 Asts: Jerry Johnson 6	Pts: Ryan Cook 16; Rebs: Mikhail Evstigneev 8 Asts: Ryan Cook 6
Barsy Atyrau wins series, 3–0

Saryarka Velodrome, Astana
Referees: Matevos Nikogosyan, Evgeniy Miheev, Arsen Andryushkin

== All-Kazakhstan Basketball Championship Team ==
The league selected their choice of the best players at each position for the season.

- Best combo guard: (Kazakhstan) Azim Yagodkin (Caspiy Aktau)
- Best shooting guard: (United States) Ryan Cook (Barsy Atyrau)
- Best small forward: (Greece) Patrick Calathes (Astana)
- Best power forward: (Kazakhstan) Anton Bykov (Kapchagay)
- Best center: (Kazakhstan) Mikhail Evstigneev (Barsy Atyrau)
