= Mike Seidman =

American football player (born 1981)

No. 82
- Position: Tight end

Personal information
- Born: February 11, 1981 (age 45); Westlake Village, California, U.S.
- Listed height: 6 ft 4 in (1.93 m)
- Listed weight: 261 lb (118 kg)

Career information
- High school: Westlake (Thousand Oaks, California)
- College: UCLA (1999–2002)
- NFL draft: 2003: 3rd round, 76th overall pick

Career history
- Carolina Panthers (2003–2006); Indianapolis Colts (2007)

Awards and highlights
- First-team All-Pac-10 (2002)

Career NFL statistics
- Receptions: 18
- Receiving yards: 158
- Receiving touchdowns: 2
- Stats at Pro Football Reference

Michael Andrew Seidman (born February 11, 1981) is an American former professional football player who was a tight end in the National Football League (NFL). He was a 1998 USA Today high school football first-team All-American. He played college football for the UCLA Bruins, earning first-team All-Pac-10 honors and setting a UCLA single-season record for most receiving yards by a tight end. Seidman was selected by the Carolina Panthers in the third round of the 2003 NFL draft. His NFL career was cut short by two ACL knee injuries.

== Early life ==
Seidman was born in Westlake Village, California, to Gary and Debra Seidman, and is Jewish. His mother is Jewish and his father is Catholic (his paternal grandfather had also been Jewish), and Seidman was raised with "little religion". He has an older sister, Lisa.

He played youth football for the Pop Warner Westlake Braves. Seidman played high school football at Westlake High School in Westlake Village, California (1995–98). He played under Jim Benkert. Other teammates included Zac Wasserman, a former Penn State quarterback recruit and USC long snapper, and fellow tight end Joe Boskovich (who was injured with an ACL tear during his and Seidman's senior season). He was a 1998 USA Today high school football first-team All-American, Parade All-American, rated the No. 14 player in the nation by The Sporting News, a member of PrepStar Dream Team, rated the No. 2 tight end in the nation by PrepStar, rated nation's No. 11 player and No. 3 receiver (No. 2 tight end) by Bobby Burton/ESPN, rated the nation's No. 30 player by SuperPrep, a SuperPrep All-American, SuperPrep ranked him the nation's No. 2 tight end and the No. 5 player in the California/Arizona/Hawaii region, named a first-team All-CIF Southern Section, selected All-CIF Division IV, and named first-team L.A. Daily News All-Valley. He also lettered three years in track and one year in basketball.

== College career ==
Seidman played college football at the University of California, Los Angeles (UCLA) ('02; Sociology) for the UCLA Bruins, where he played mostly on special teams as a true freshman. He played in 10 out of 11 games his first year; he would not miss another game the rest of his college career. He led the team in yards-per-catch average in his junior year in 2001, as he averaged 20.8 yards per reception.

As a senior in 2002, he was one of the three finalists for the John Mackey Award, which is given to the best tight end in the nation. He was the team's MVP, received All-Pac-10 First-team honors, and set a UCLA record for most receiving yards in a season by a tight end (631). He was also named All-Conference.

== Professional career ==
=== Carolina Panthers ===
At the 2003 NFL Scouting Combine Seidman ran the 40-yard dash in 4.80, and performed 20 225-pound bench press reps. Seidman was selected in the third round (76th overall) of the 2003 NFL draft by the Carolina Panthers. He signed a three-year contract, and received a signing bonus of $512,575 ($897,000 in current dollar terms), and base salaries of $225,000 (2003), $305,000 (2004), and $380,000 (2005).

He appeared in 12 games and registered five catches for 35 yards. He then tore his ACL in his left knee in December, and spent the rest of the 2003 season on injured reserve.

Seidman returned from injury at the start of the 2004 NFL season, and scored the first two touchdowns of his career against the Kansas City Chiefs and the Tampa Bay Buccaneers; the second came while lying on his back in the end zone. He appeared in 16 games for the Panthers in 2004, and was starting. He was on the team roster for Super Bowl XXXVIII, but was on the injured reserve list.

In January 2005 it was announced that he had suffered a torn ACL in his right knee in September 2004, and might miss the season. He appeared in 12 games for the Panthers in 2005.

He tore his ACL in his right knee again in September 2006, after starting three games, and was out for the rest of the season. He was cut from the Panthers in the offseason.

=== Indianapolis Colts ===
He then signed with the Indianapolis Colts on May 8, 2007. In early August 2007 it was reported that Seidman injured a knee the first day of camp. Seidman was placed on the injured reserve on August 4, 2007.

== Honors ==
In 2018 he was inducted into the Southern California Jewish Sports Hall of Fame.

== Post-football life ==
Seidman is now a broker with real estate firm Cushman & Wakefield in Los Angeles. Seidman was charged with felony vehicular manslaughter in October 2020, ultimately convicted, and sentenced to four years in state prison.

== See also ==
- List of select Jewish football players
