= Kulipari =

Animated television series

- Title card for season 1
- Genre: Comedy-drama; Fantasy; Action; Adventure
- Created by: Trevor Pryce
- Based on: Characters created by Trevor Pryce
- Developed by: Trevor Pryce; Splash Entertainment
- Written by: Lee Nichols (season 1); Joel Naftali (season 1); Tad Stones (season 1); Trevor Pryce (seasons 2–3); Joshua Starnes (season 2)
- Directed by: Tad Stones (season 1); Chuck Patton (season 2); Trevor Pryce (season 3); Tyriq-Tyrell Murphy (season 3)
- Voices of: Josh Keaton; Keith David; Mark Hamill; Wendie Malick; Charlie Adler
- Composer: Michael Tavera
- Countries of origin: United States; Ireland
- Original language: English
- No. of seasons: 3
- No. of episodes: 26

Production
- Executive producers: Mike Young; Trevor Pryce; Paul Cummins; Nicolas Atlan (season 1); Steve Rosen (season 2)
- Producers: Clarise Cameron; Cathy Ní Fhlaithearta; Patrick Inness (season 1)
- Running time: 23 minutes
- Production companies: The Outlook Company; Telegael Teoranta; Splash Entertainment

Original release
- Network: Netflix (seasons 1–2); Hulu (season 3)
- Release: September 2, 2016 – July 28, 2024

Kulipari is an animated television series created by Trevor Pryce for Netflix. It is co-produced by Splash Entertainment, The Outlook Company and Telegael Teoranta. Its first season, subtitled An Army of Frogs, was released in September 2016. The show is based on Pryce's novel series of the same name. Kulipari: Heritage, a four-issue comic miniseries taking place between the first and second seasons, was published by Red 5 Comics and released from August to November 2016. The series was renewed for a second season called Kulipari: Dream Walker on March 8, 2017, which was released on November 20, 2018. A graphic novel called Kulipari: Warflower was purported to be released on January 1, 2019, but it was canceled.

Three compilation movies for season 1, Kulipari: An Army of Frogs, Kulipari: Mercenaries and Kulipari: Amphibian's Rise have been released on Amazon, Google Play and iTunes between 2017 and 2018.

On February 28, 2023, it was announced that Hulu would be continuing the series with a newly announced third season titled Kulipari: A King Rises, that was set to premiere at the end of the year but was delayed to July 28, 2024, as well as a CGI film reboot of the first season, initially announced to premiere in 2024. The first two seasons were added to Hulu in February 2023. The first two seasons have also been remastered and include new opening and ending credit sequences.

The third season, Kulipari: A King Rises, was released on July 28, 2024.

== Plot ==
The series takes place in the Amphibilands — a hidden village of frogs. For many years the inhabitants of the Amphibilands have lived safely, protected by a magical Veil and an elite group of poison frogs called the Kulipari. The story begins with the frogs of the Amphibilands finding their homeland threatened by an army of scorpions teamed up with the magically powerful Spider Queen. Our hero, Darel, a young frog that has always dreamed of joining the Kulipari despite his lack of poison, finds himself at the front of the battle. With the help of his friends, Darel must overcome his anxieties to embrace his dream of becoming a Kulipari warrior and save all the frogs from extinction.

== Characters ==
=== Main characters ===
- Darel - The main protagonist, and an Australian wood frog. Son of Apari and Acala.
- Gurnugan "Gee" - Darel's loyal best friend, he is a fat, gluttonous, awkward Australian wood frog.
- Coorah - Another Australian wood frog who is also a friend of Darel, and brief girlfriend of Arabanoo. She has medical skills.
- Stinger - A young scorpion who is identified as being "of Marmoo's bloodline" by Old Jir. Later he becomes the new Scorpion Lord. In A King Rises, he initially trusted Marmoo while leading the scorpion armies before the latter stabbed him in the back during the war at the Reef.
- Tharta, Thuma & Tipi - Triplets, children of Apari and Acala and younger siblings of Darel. In the Dream Walker and A King Rises, the triplets grew up to be young Kulipari in Nova Australis. Tipi, however was chosen by the Rainbow Serpent to save everyone due to her love and compassion for Stinger and the entire species. Becoming the Queen of the Outback.
- Old Jir - An elderly Kulipari frog warrior living as a hermit near the village.

=== Professional Kulipari Frogs ===
- Burnu - The green, wig-wearing male leader of an elite team of four Kulipari.
- Ponto - Yellow male medic of Burnu's team, brother to Dingo.
- Dingo - Orange female Archer of Burnu's team, sister to Ponto.
- Quoba - The green, hooded female scout of Burnu's team, but she sacrificed all her poison to save everyone at the Great Rock. In the Dream Walker and A King Rises. She later becomes the current Warflower and wields War Botany and explore the abandoned Cardigal, She confronts Darkan and his minions, Yabber and Allora despite her struggles to find the way. Near the end of the war, she saved everyone once again with the help of the assistance to stop a huge tidal wave.
- Wilka - The newest partner of Burnu, a light blue Kulipari female who was sent on a mission to infiltrate the spider god's fortress and like Koa, she too was also raised by the geckos in Kulipari: Heritage.
- Koa - A young Kulipari frog who was raised by Chief Bindi and the geckos from the Reef. He was briefly kidnapped by Darkan.

=== Villains ===
- Lord Marmoo - A powerful scorpion warlord who is the main antagonist of the first season and Darel's first biggest nemesis. He was eventually resurrected twice from Jarrah and Nahradhan after being killed twice. Although in Kulipari: Heritage and later on. He's revealed to be one of the four Poison Scrolls.
- Commander Pigo - Marmoo's younger brother and right-hand man. He later joined Darel and the others during their exile by Marmoo. In the Dream Walker, he becomes one of council members in Nova Australis and later sacrificed himself during the ambush by Darkan's armies during the rescue mission to Cardigal.
- Spider Queen Jarrah - The queen of the redback spiders and Sergu's former student.
- Darkan - A giant marine iguana warlord ruling the fortress city of Cardigal. While battling Ponto in the dungeon, he revealed to be a Kulipari as well. In A King Rises, he and his armies and henchmen survived the fall of Cardigal and exact a revenge by threatening the Reef. During the war at the Reef. he is incapacitated and knocked out when the Queen Cobra appeared.
- Nahradhan - The golden-colored "god" of spiders and their strongest Nightcaster and Dreamcaster, whom Falgha worked with until her betrayal after Season 1.
- Daly - A white female spider Nightcaster and Darkan's right-hand woman.

=== Other characters ===
- Apari - The late Kulipari and husband of Acala and Darel and the triplets' father (in the books, he is a corroboree frog).
- Acala - Darel's mother and widow of Apari.
- Arabanoo - A red-eyed tree frog, who initially thinks Darel will never become a Kulipari (in the books, he is a white-lipped tree frog). During the Invasion of the Amphibiland, he is killed by Marmoo while Darel and the others are away (in the books, He was killed when taking a bullet for Coorah).
- Turtle King Sergu - A wise old turtle and practitioner of Dreamcasting magic (in the books, he is a flatback sea turtle).
- Pippi - A young platypus girl and a Stargazer student who has visions that help Darel on his quest. She remains and becomes a Dreamcaster of the new settlement in Season 2.
- Killara - A green lizard mercenary leader who works for Marmoo with his people until he betrayed Marmoo when Darel offered him a pearl. In the Dream Walker, he spends a significant amount of time and effort trying to steal his pearl back from Lord Darkan despite the debt from him. He enters a shaky alliance with Darel's rescue party, offering them a way into Darkan's palace in exchange for help reaching his goal. In his pursuit for the pearl, Killara abandons his loyal companions, and claimed the fake pearl instead of an actual one, resulted in all for nothing. In A King Rises, he is assisted by his niece and nephews Payu, Moe, and Toukley from his sister Careel in order to search for Poison Scrolls. Throughout search, they came across many obstacles, including Orani.
- Skink - A female skink mercenary working for Killara until he betrayed her and Nogo.
- Nogo - A large and strong male bearded dragon mercenary working for Killara until he betrayed him and Skink.
- Xava - An mute white male lizard living with in the village Darel founded.
- Caz - An elderly male scorpion who is the survivor of the Amphibilands wars. He was later killed by Stinger for poisoning Jir.
- Falgha - A female redback spider who is Queen Jarrah’s pupil and the current leader of the spiders after the fall of Cardigal.
- Yabber - A long-necked turtle who is the apprentice, star pupil of former Turtle King Sergu, and the current Turtle King.

More characters to be listed

== Cast ==
- Josh Keaton as Darel, Nahradhan
- Mikey Kelley as Gee
- Lacey Chabert as Coorah
- Phil LaMarr as Arabanoo, Apari, Killara, Stinger, Darkan
- Keith David as Lord Marmoo
- Charlie Adler as Commander Pigo, Coorah's dad, Bindi, additional voices
- Wendie Malick as Spider Queen Jarrah
- Mark Hamill as Old Jir, Ponto (episodes 8–9), Caz
- Jess Harnell as Burnu, Yabber, and Sergu
- Candi Milo as Dingo, The Stargazer, Fahlga
- Cree Summer as Skink, Daly and Scorpicurist
- Kevin Michael Richardson as Ponto (episodes 10-present), Nogo, Tharta, Scorpion Warriors
- Kath Soucie as Pippi, The Rainbow Serpent
- Rolonda Watts as Chief Olba
- Amy Margolis as Quoba, Tipi, Akala
- Laraine Newman as Koa, Thuma

== Production ==
The series is co-produced by American studios Splash Entertainment and The Outlook Company and Irish studio Telegael Teoranta. Animation was outsourced to Cartoon Conrad Enterprises for the first season and Oasis Animation for the second and third seasons.

== Episodes ==
=== Series overview ===
Series overview
Season	Title	Episodes	Originally released	Network
1	An Army of Frogs	13	September 2, 2016	Netflix
2	Dream Walker	10	November 20, 2018	Netflix
3	A King Rises	3	July 28, 2024	Hulu

=== Season 1: An Army of Frogs (2016) ===
No. overall	No. in season	Title	Original release date
1	1	"Episode 1"	September 2, 2016
While a young frog named Darel dreams of becoming a Kulipari warrior like his late father, Lord Marmoo of the Scorpions starts conspiring with Spider Queen Jarrah to attack the Amphibilands.
2	2	"Episode 2"	September 2, 2016
While training with Arabanoo the Tree Frog, Darel accidentally destroys the local market. The townspeople and the Chief ban him from training as punishment. Unfortunately for the frogs, the Scorpion King's army is crossing the Veil with the Spider Queen's magic.
3	3	"Episode 3"	September 2, 2016
Darel discovers that Scorpion soldiers have broken through the Veil, and uses his Kulipari training to defend his friends and family.
4	4	"Episode 4"	September 2, 2016
Darel's best friend Gee is captured by the Scorpion soldiers. Darel must use his Kulipari training to find and save his best friend, who was caught by a scorpion.
5	5	"Episode 5"	September 2, 2016
Darel disguises himself as a sandpaper frog to join a group of lizard mercenaries and rescue Gee, but are the lizards able to be trusted?
6	6	"Episode 6"	September 2, 2016
After rescuing Gee, Darel and his friend decide to stay at the Scorpion camp and do some damage. Meanwhile, their friends and family in the Amphibilands are preparing for battle under the guidance of Old Jir.
7	7	"Episode 7"	September 2, 2016
Darel and Gee finally meet the famous Kulipari and go on a journey together to find the Turtle King to save the veil.
8	8	"Episode 8"	September 2, 2016
The Spider Queen finally manages to break down the Veil, allowing the Scorpions to enter the Amphibilands.
9	9	"Episode 9"	September 2, 2016
The Kulipari (and Darel) join the villagers to fight the scorpion army and the Spider Queen's magic.
10	10	"Episode 10"	September 2, 2016
Though Lord Marmoo and Queen Jarrah have been temporarily defeated, Darel and the Kulipari go on a journey to find a way to prevent the scorpions from invading the Amphibilands again.
11	11	"Episode 11"	September 2, 2016
The Rainbow Serpent delivers an important message to Darel, while the Spider Queen makes Lord Marmoo stronger than he's ever been before.
12	12	"Episode 12"	September 2, 2016
Darel and the Kulipari exit the Veil in search of allies who can help defend the Amphibilands from Lord Marmoo and his Scorpion Army.
13	13	"Episode 13"	September 2, 2016
Darel leads the bruised and banished frogs and platypi through the desert, trying to find water with the Rainbow Serpent's help.

=== Season 2: Dream Walker (2018) ===
No. overall	No. in season	Title	Original release date
14	1	"Episode 1"	November 20, 2018
As the Kulipari thrive in their new settlement of Nova Australis, Chief Bindi of the Gecko tribe seeks Darel's help to rescue his kidnapped son.
15	2	"Episode 2"	November 20, 2018
While the Kulipari youth deal with a snake problem, Darel and his party descend upon Cardigal, where Darkan's guards scour the area for intruders.
16	3	"Episode 3"	November 20, 2018
Darel dons a disguise to rescue Ponto deep inside the dungeons of Darkan's fortress. Stinger and the triplets tend to a poisoned Jir back home.
17	4	"Episode 4"	November 20, 2018
As Jir's condition worsens, the Kulipari youth search for a rare flower to be used in an antidote. Lady Fahlga offers to help Darel in locating Ponto.
18	5	"Episode 5"	November 20, 2018
With all of Cardigal focused on the tournament, Captain Killara offers Darel and his rescue party a way to slip inside Darkan's palace undetected
19	6	"Episode 6"	November 20, 2018
Per Killara's plan, Darel and party find themselves easily infiltrating the palace dungeon. But a cleverly set trap awaits their arrival.
20	7	"Episode 7"	November 20, 2018
The events that transpired during Darel's rescue attempt are shown from Killara's viewpoint. Lady Fahlga gets an opportunity to exact her revenge.
21	8	"Episode 8"	November 20, 2018
The Kulipari youth rush to deliver the antidote to Jir. Chained to each other, Marmoo and Ponto must fight together to survive the tournament.
22	9	"Episode 9"	November 20, 2018
Darel and Lady Fahlga hatch an escape plan, urging Ponto to persuade Killara's soldiers to convince prisoners inside Darkan's castle to revolt.
23	10	"Episode 10"	November 20, 2018
While Koa's body floats in a trancelike state, his mind struggles inside the dreamworld as a battle for his soul rages on between Sergu and Jarrah.

=== Season 3: A King Rises (2024) ===
No. overall	No. in season	Title	Original release date
24	1	"Episode 1"	July 20, 2024
The new Scorpion Lord leads his army and uncovers an impossible ally. As the citizens of Nova Australis celebrate the return of Koa, Killara sets out on a journey to collect the poison scrolls, with the help of his young niece and nephews.
25	2	"Episode 2"	July 28, 2024
Stargazer has a vision of unstoppable danger. A power struggle ensues after Killara's band of misfits attempt to steal the spider scroll. Tipi's dreams have her fearing for the fate of her friend.
26	3	"Episode 3"	July 28, 2024
When Darkan, Stinger, and the Kulipari go to war, a greater enemy threatens them all. The King of the Outback must rise to command the serpent and save everyone.

== Accolades ==
Mark Hamill was nominated for Outstanding Performer in an Animated Program at the 46th Daytime Emmy Awards.
