= Christian Jones (linebacker) =

American football player (born 1991)

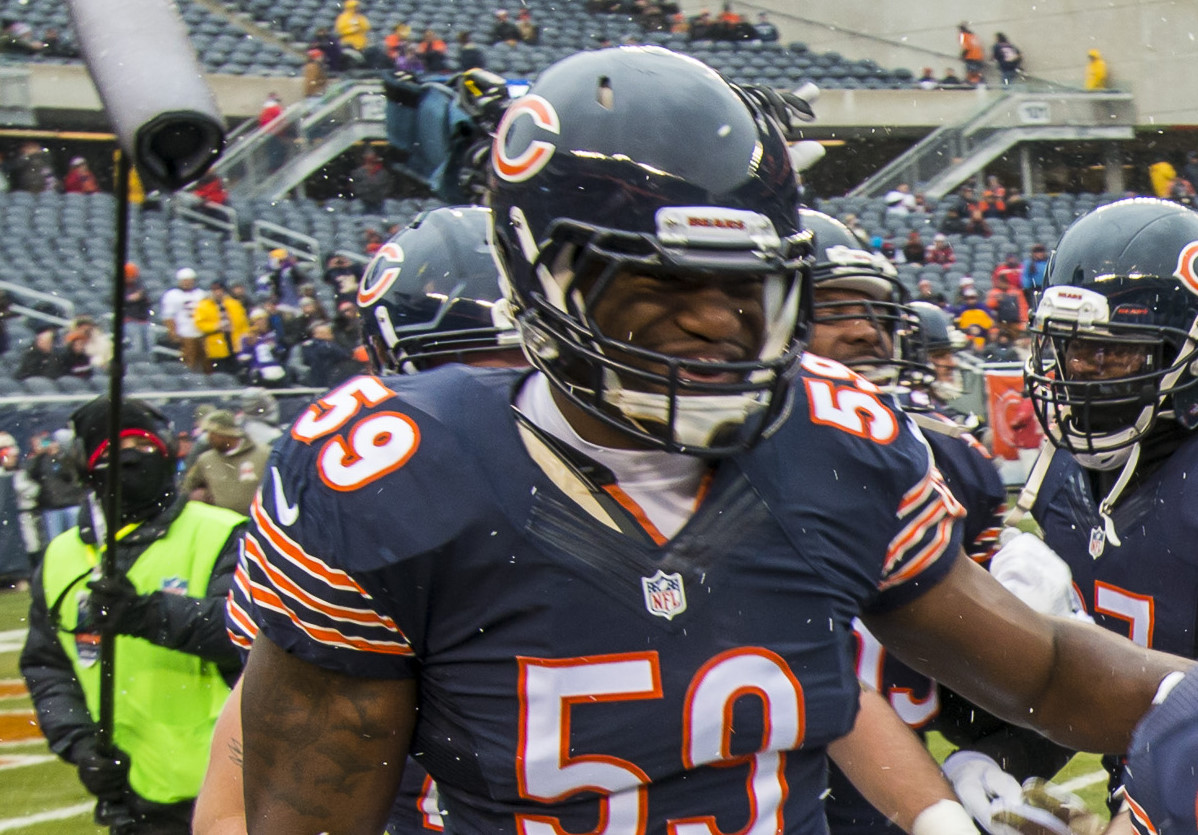
- Jones with the Chicago Bears in 2014

No. 59, 52, 57, 48
- Position: Linebacker

Personal information
- Born: February 18, 1991 (age 35); Orlando, Florida, U.S.
- Listed height: 6 ft 3 in (1.91 m)
- Listed weight: 245 lb (111 kg)

Career information
- High school: Lake Howell (Winter Park, Florida)
- College: Florida State
- NFL draft: 2014: undrafted

Career history
- Chicago Bears (2014–2017); Detroit Lions (2018–2020); Chicago Bears (2021); Seattle Seahawks (2022)

Awards and highlights
- BCS national champion (2014); 2× Second-team All-ACC (2012, 2013)

Career NFL statistics
- Total tackles: 465
- Sacks: 7.0
- Forced fumbles: 2
- Fumble recoveries: 4
- Pass deflections: 16
- Stats at Pro Football Reference

Christian Jones (born February 18, 1991) is an American former professional football player who was a linebacker in the National Football League (NFL). He was signed by the Chicago Bears as an undrafted free agent in 2014. He played college football for the Florida State Seminoles, and also played for the Detroit Lions and Seattle Seahawks.

== Early life ==
Jones attended Lake Howell High School in Winter Park, Florida. He recorded 326 tackles during his career. A five-star recruit, he was ranked as the second best outside linebacker in the country by Rivals.com.

== College career ==
As a true freshman in 2010, Jones played in all 14 games, recording 18 tackles and three sacks. As a sophomore in 2011, he started all 13 games, recording 56 tackles and three sacks. As a junior in 2012, he started all 14 games and led the team in tackles with 95. He nearly entered the 2013 NFL draft, but decided against it. As a senior in 2013, he was suspended one game for violation of team rules. He recorded 56 tackles with 7.5 tackles for a loss, one interception and two sacks.

== Professional career ==
=== Pre-draft ===
Jones attended the NFL Scouting Combine in Indianapolis, Indiana and completed all of the combine and positional drills. On May 5, 2014, it was reported that Jones and his Florida State teammates Timmy Jernigan, and Telvin Smith had all failed drug tests at the NFL Combine. On March 18, 2014, Jones participated at Florida State's pro day and ran positional drills for scouts and team representatives. At the conclusion of the pre-draft process, Jones was projected to be a second or third-round pick by NFL draft experts and scouts. He was ranked as the ninth best outside linebacker prospect in the draft by DraftScout.com.

Pre-draft measurables
| Height | Weight | Arm length | Hand span | Wingspan | 40-yard dash | 10-yard split | 20-yard split | 20-yard shuttle | Three-cone drill | Vertical jump | Broad jump | Bench press |
|---|---|---|---|---|---|---|---|---|---|---|---|---|
| 6 ft 3 1/8 in (1.91 m) | 240 lb (109 kg) | 33 1/2 in (0.85 m) | 9 5/8 in (0.24 m) | 6 ft 8 5/8 in (2.05 m) | 4.74 s | 1.72 s | 2.79 s | 4.38 s | 7.03 s | 33.5 in (0.85 m) | 9 ft 7 in (2.92 m) | 17 reps |
All values from NFL Combine/Pro Day

=== Chicago Bears (first stint) ===
==== 2014 ====
On May 10, 2014, the Chicago Bears signed Jones to a three-year, $1.57 million undrafted free agent contract that includes a signing bonus of $5,000. Jones' fall in the draft was widely attributed to his failed drug test at the NFL combine. He also received an offer from the Jacksonville Jaguars, but chose the Bears partly due to the linebackers coach Reggie Herring.

Throughout training camp, Jones competed for a roster spot at linebacker against Khaseem Greene, Shea McClellin, Jordan Senn, Dede Lattimore, and Jerry Franklin. Head coach Marc Trestman named Jones the backup strongside linebacker to start the regular season, behind Shea McClellin.

He made his professional regular season debut in the Chicago Bears' season-opening 23–20 loss against the Buffalo Bills. The following week, Jones recorded his first career tackle on Bruce Ellington for a five-yard loss during a muffed punt return by Ellington in the second quarter of the Bears' 28–20 victory at the San Francisco 49ers in Week 2. On October 12, 2014, Jones earned his first career start in place of an injured Shea McClellin. He recorded four combined tackles during a 27–13 victory at the Atlanta Falcons in Week 6. On December 15, 2014, Jones started at outside linebacker after Lance Briggs was declared inactive due to a rib injury. Jones recorded a season-high 13 combined tackles (eight solo) in the Bears' 31–15 loss to the New Orleans Saints in Week 15. The following week, he collected a season-high 11 solo tackles and made his first career sack on Matthew Stafford during a 20–14 loss to the Detroit Lions in Week 16. He finished his rookie season with 69 combined tackles (42 solo), two sacks, and a pass deflection in 16 games and five starts. On December 29, 2014, it was announced that the Chicago Bears fired general manager Phil Emery and head coach Marc Trestman after the Bears finished with a 5–11 record.

==== 2015 ====
Jones was moved to inside linebacker after the Bears' new defensive coordinator, Vic Fangio, installed a base 3-4 defense and held an open competition to name new starting inside linebackers. Jones competed for the job against Jon Bostic, Shea McClellin, and Mason Foster. Head coach John Fox named Jones and Shea McClellin the starting inside linebackers to begin the 2015 regular season, along with outside linebackers Lamarr Houston and Pernell McPhee.

In Week 6, Jones collected a season-high nine combined tackles and deflected a pass during a 37–34 loss at the Detroit Lions. On November 22, 2015, he made a season-high tying nine combined tackles in the Bears' 17–15 loss to the Denver Broncos in Week 11. On December 20, 2015, head coach John Fox benched Jones for the Bears' Week 15 matchup at the Minnesota Vikings. He was benched due to his poor play in the last three games, but was reinserted in the starting lineup the next week after Shea McClellin was inactive after sustaining a concussion. He finished the 2015 season with 86 combined tackles (62 solo) and four pass deflections in 15 games and 13 starts. Pro Football Focus gave Jones an overall grade of 65.2, which ranked him 38th among all qualifying linebackers in 2015.

==== 2016 ====
On June 16, 2016, it was announced that Jones would be making the move to outside linebacker after the Bears drafted Nick Kwiatkoski and signed Danny Trevathan and Jerrell Freeman. During training camp, he competed for a job as an outside linebacker against Pernell McPhee, Lamarr Houston, Willie Young, Leonard Floyd, Sam Acho, and Lamin Barrow. Head coach John Fox named Jones the backup left outside linebacker to start the regular season, behind rookie Leonard Floyd. Jones appeared in the Chicago Bears' season-opener at the Houston Texans and recorded a season-high four combined tackles in their 23–14 loss. He started two games after Leonard Floyd sustained an ankle injury in Week 4. He finished the 2016 season with a total of 15 combined tackles (nine solo) and a pass deflection in 16 games and two starts.

==== 2017 ====
On March 11, 2017, the Chicago Bears signed Jones to a one-year, $1.50 million contract that includes a signing bonus of $500,000.

Throughout training camp, Jones competed for a role as a backup inside linebacker against Nick Kwiatkoski. Head coach John Fox named him a backup inside linebacker behind Jerrell Freeman, Danny Trevathan, and primary backup Nick Kwiatkoski.

On September 28, 2017, Jones earned his first start of the season after Jerrell Freeman tore his pectoral muscle in the season-opener and Nick Kwiatkoski sustained a chest injury in Week 2. He recorded five combined tackles in the Bears' 35–14 loss at the Green Bay Packers in Week 4. In Week 11, he collected eight combined tackles and sacked quarterback Matthew Stafford during a 27–24 loss to the Detroit Lions. On December 3, 2017, Jones collected a season-high 13 combined tackles (ten solo) and sacked quarterback Jimmy Garoppolo in the Bears' 15–14 loss to the San Francisco 49ers in Week 13. He finished the 2017 season with 90 combined tackles (60 solo), two pass deflections, and two sacks in 16 games and 11 starts. He received the 64th highest grade among the 87 linebackers that qualified in 2017.

=== Detroit Lions ===
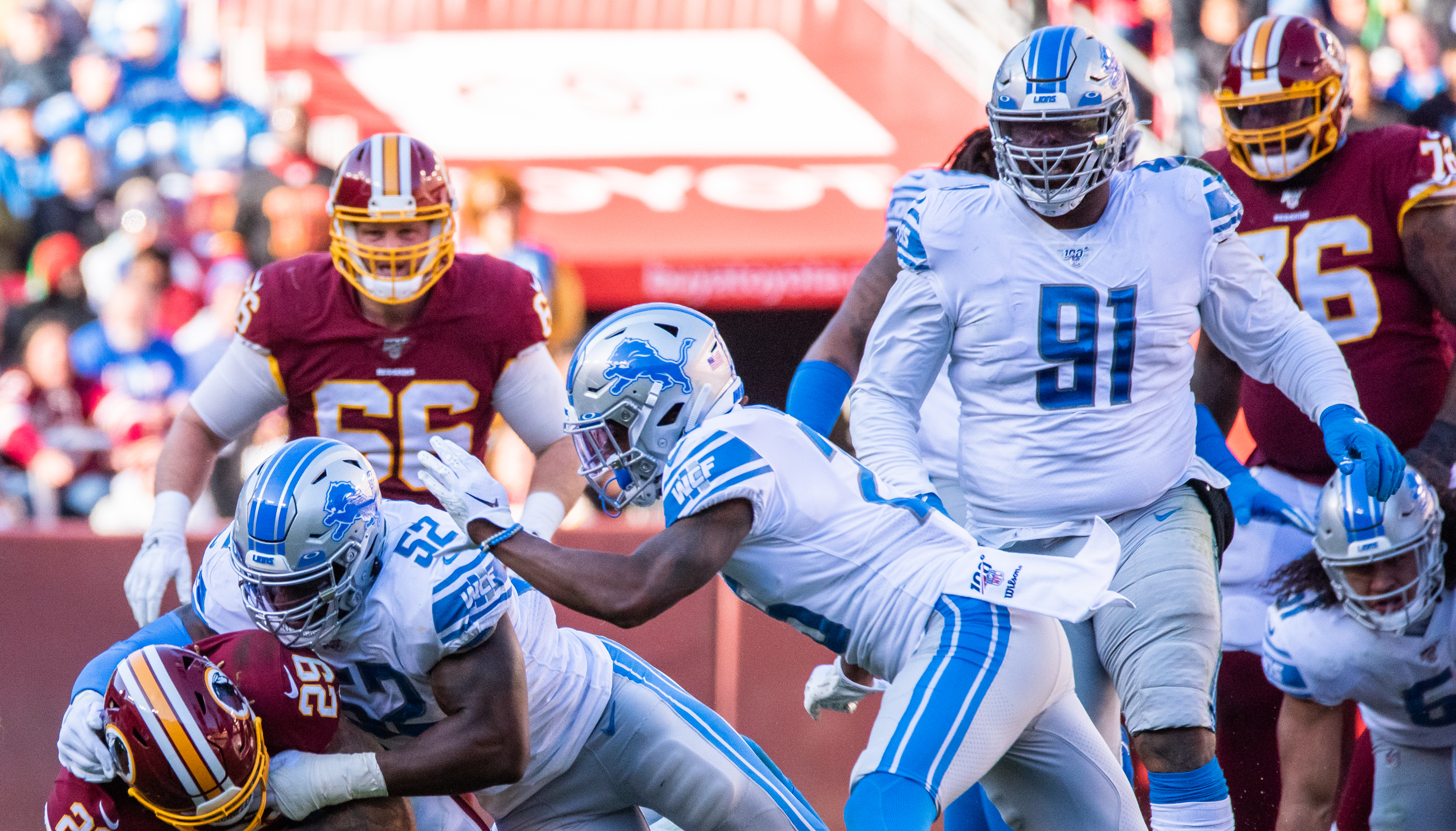
Jones (#52) tackling a Washington Redskins player in 2019

On March 15, 2018, the Detroit Lions signed Jones to a two-year, $6.35 million contract that includes $2.80 million guaranteed and a signing bonus of $1.75 million. He started all 16 games for the Lions in 2018, finishing fourth on the team with 69 tackles, along with a sack, three passes defensed, and a forced fumble.

On November 2, 2019, Jones signed a two-year contract extension with the Lions through the 2021 season. He started 13 games in 2019 before being placed on injured reserve on December 21, 2019. He finished the season with 51 tackles, two sacks, and four passes defensed.

Jones was released after the 2020 season on March 8, 2021.

=== Chicago Bears (second stint) ===
Jones signed a one-year contract with the Bears on March 23, 2021.

=== Seattle Seahawks ===
On September 14, 2022, Jones signed with the practice squad of the Seattle Seahawks. He was released on October 25.

== NFL career statistics ==
Legend
| **Bold** | Career high |

| Year | Team | Games | | Tackles | | | | | Interceptions | | | | | Fumbles | | | |
| Year | Team | GP | GS | Cmb | Solo | Ast | Sck | TFL | Int | Yds | TD | Lng | PD | FF | FR | Yds | TD |
|---|---|---|---|---|---|---|---|---|---|---|---|---|---|---|---|---|---|
| 2014 | CHI | 16 | 5 | 70 | 42 | 28 | **2.0** | 3 | 0 | 0 | 0 | 0 | 1 | 0 | **1** | **2** | 0 |
| 2015 | CHI | 15 | 13 | 86 | **62** | 24 | 0.0 | 2 | 0 | 0 | 0 | 0 | **4** | 0 | **1** | 0 | 0 |
| 2016 | CHI | 16 | 2 | 16 | 10 | 6 | 0.0 | 0 | 0 | 0 | 0 | 0 | 1 | 0 | 0 | 0 | 0 |
| 2017 | CHI | 16 | 11 | **90** | 60 | **30** | **2.0** | **5** | 0 | 0 | 0 | 0 | 2 | **1** | **1** | 0 | 0 |
| 2018 | DET | 16 | **16** | 69 | 48 | 21 | 1.0 | 3 | 0 | 0 | 0 | 0 | 3 | **1** | 0 | 0 | 0 |
| 2019 | DET | 13 | 13 | 51 | 29 | 22 | **2.0** | 2 | 0 | 0 | 0 | 0 | **4** | 0 | **1** | 0 | 0 |
| 2020 | DET | 16 | 13 | 57 | 32 | 25 | 0.0 | 2 | 0 | 0 | 0 | 0 | 1 | 0 | 0 | 0 | 0 |
| 2021 | CHI | **17** | 1 | 24 | 13 | 11 | 0.0 | 0 | 0 | 0 | 0 | 0 | 0 | 0 | 0 | 0 | 0 |
| 2022 | SEA | 3 | 0 | 2 | 1 | 1 | 0.0 | 0 | 0 | 0 | 0 | 0 | 0 | 0 | 0 | 0 | 0 |
| | | 128 | 74 | 465 | 297 | 168 | 7.0 | 17 | 0 | 0 | 0 | 0 | 16 | 2 | 4 | 2 | 0 |

== Personal life ==
His father, Willie Jones also played at Florida State and played for the Oakland Raiders of the National Football League. His mother, Tarralyn Jones, is the CEO of TJ's Designs & Events, motivational speaker, and published author of "Living A Masked Life" .
