= Sheldon Price =

American football player (born 1991)

No. 22, 27, 40
- Position: Cornerback

Personal information
- Born: March 26, 1991 (age 35); Long Beach, California, U.S.
- Listed height: 6 ft 2 in (1.88 m)
- Listed weight: 194 lb (88 kg)

Career information
- High school: Bishop Amat Memorial (La Puente, California)
- College: UCLA
- NFL draft: 2013: undrafted

Career history
- Indianapolis Colts (2013–2015); Baltimore Ravens (2015–2017); Kansas City Chiefs (2018)*; Arizona Hotshots (2019)*; Montreal Alouettes (2019)*
- * Offseason or practice squad member only

Career NFL statistics
- Total tackles: 1
- Stats at Pro Football Reference

Sheldon Andrew Price (born March 26, 1991) is an American former professional football player who was a cornerback in the National Football League (NFL). He played college football for the UCLA Bruins, and signed with the Indianapolis Colts as an undrafted free agent in 2013. He has also played for the Baltimore Ravens and Kansas City Chiefs.

== Early life ==
Price attended Bishop Amat High School of La Puente, California. He was selected to the SuperPrep All-Far West team, Scout.com West Hot 150 (ranked as the 81st prospect). Price was also selected to the Tacoma News-Tribune Western 100 and CalHiSports.com All-State third-team during high school. In his junior year of high school, he was selected first-team all-league team and second-team All-San Gabriel Valley.

College recruiting
Name	Hometown	School	Height	Weight	40^{‡}	Commit date
Sheldon Price; Cornerback	La Puente, California	Bishop Amat High School	6 ft 2 in (1.88 m)	155 lb (70 kg)	4.56	Apr 27, 2008
Sheldon Price; Cornerback	Recruit ratings: Scout: Rivals:					
Overall recruit ranking: Scout: 41 (CB) Rivals: 24 (CB), 209 (National), 21 (California)
‡ Refers to 40-yard dash; Note: In many cases, Scout, Rivals, 247Sports, On3, and ESPN may conflict in their listings of height, weight and 40 time.; In these cases, the average was taken. ESPN grades are on a 100-point scale.; Sources: "2009 UCLA Bruins Football Commitments". Rivals.; "2009 UCLA Bruins Football Recruiting Commits". Scout.; "Scout.com Team Recruiting Rankings". Scout.; "2009 Team Ranking". Rivals.com.

== College career ==
Price played college football at the University of California, Los Angeles. In his freshman season, he was selected for The Sporting News' Pac-10 All-Freshman team and the Rivals.com All-America Team. He was a co-winner of the UCLA's John Boncheff Jr. Memorial Award for Rookie of the Year following his freshman season. He finished college with a total of 157 tackles, 5 Interceptions, 26 Pass Deflections and 2 Forced fumbles. He was selected to participate in the 2013 East-West Shrine Game on the West team.

== Professional career ==
=== Indianapolis Colts ===
On April 27, 2013, Price signed with the Indianapolis Colts as an undrafted free agent. Price was waived injured on September 25, 2015.

=== Baltimore Ravens ===
On October 20, 2015, Price signed to the Baltimore Ravens practice squad. He was elevated to the active roster on December 29, 2015.

On October 11, 2016, Price was placed on injured reserve after suffering a biceps injury in Week 5.

On September 16, 2017, Price was placed on injured reserve with a concussion. He was released on October 19, 2017.

=== Kansas City Chiefs ===
On January 3, 2018, Price signed a reserve/future contract with the Kansas City Chiefs. He was released on May 1, 2018.

=== Arizona Hotshots ===
Price signed with the Arizona Hotshots of the Alliance of American Football for the 2019 season, but was waived on January 8, 2019, before the start of the regular season.

=== Montreal Alouettes ===
On May 21, 2019, Price signed with the Montreal Alouettes of the Canadian Football League.

== Personal life ==
He is the son of Dennis and Letitia Price, both UCLA graduates. His sister, Kylie, was a member of the UCLA women's track and field team as an All-American long jumper. His father Dennis Price played college football for the UCLA Bruins and was a fifth round selection of the 1988 NFL draft by the Los Angeles Raiders. He played four NFL seasons at cornerback, two each with the Los Angeles Raiders (1988–1989) and New York Jets (1991–1992). Price's cousin is former NBA player Harold Ellis.
