= William Robinson (American football) =

American football player (born 1984)

No. 73, 68
- Position: Offensive tackle

Personal information
- Born: December 20, 1984 (age 41); Monterey Park, California, U.S.
- Listed height: 6 ft 5 in (1.96 m)
- Listed weight: 297 lb (135 kg)

Career information
- High school: Bishop Amat Memorial (La Puente, California)
- College: San Diego State
- NFL draft: 2008: undrafted

Career history
- Seattle Seahawks (2008); Washington Redskins (2009−2010); Seattle Seahawks (2010); New Orleans Saints (2011); Jacksonville Jaguars (2011); New Orleans Saints (2012)

Career NFL statistics
- Games played: 7
- Games started: 1
- Stats at Pro Football Reference

William Robinson (born December 20, 1984) is an American former professional football player who was an offensive tackle in the National Football League (NFL). He played college football for the San Diego State Aztecs.

== Early life ==
Robinson grew up in Pomona, California and attended Bishop Amat High School.

== College career ==
Robinson was a two-year starter for San Diego State.

== Professional career ==
Robinson was signed by the Seattle Seahawks as an undrafted free agent in 2008. He was released by the Seattle Seahawks in September 2009. He later played for the Washington Redskins, New Orleans Saints, and Jacksonville Jaguars. Robinson was picked up by the New Orleans Saints and activated for the November 25, 2012, game against the San Francisco 49ers. He took over for Bryce Harris at offensive right tackle in the first quarter after Harris went down with an ankle injury. Robinson played solid through the first half, with no sacks or tackles made by defenders he engaged with.
