= Mike Gogulski =

Formerly-American stateless activist

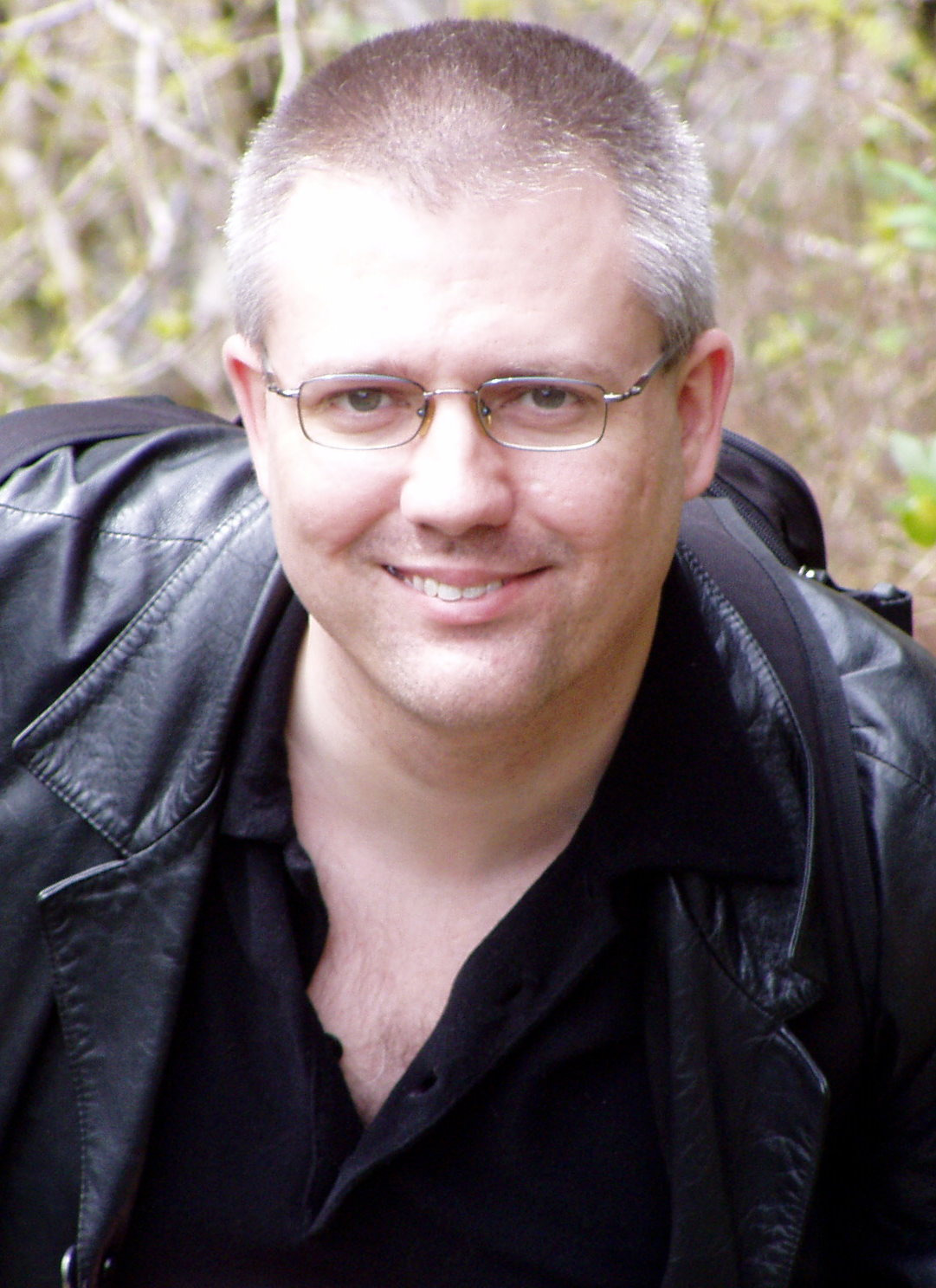
- Gogulski at Devil's Bridge in Ceredigion, Wales in 2007
- Born: Michael Jude Gogulski; August 8, 1972 (age 54); Phoenix, Arizona, U.S.
- Citizenship: United States (1972–2008); Stateless (2008–present)
- Education: Lake Howell High School; Orlando College (dropped out)
- Occupations: Translator; editor; proofreader
- Known for: Renouncing his U.S. citizenship and becoming stateless
- Website: gogulski.com

Michael Jude Gogulski (born August 8, 1972) is a political activist and freelance translator. He is one of a small number of former Americans known to have voluntarily become stateless.

== Early life ==
Gogulski's grandparents immigrated to the U.S. in the 19th century; his paternal grandparents from near Poznań, Poland, and his maternal grandparents from Germany. Gogulski was born in Phoenix, Arizona, but his family moved to Orlando, Florida, soon after due to his father's job as an electromechanical engineer. He has a younger sister, Karen. He attended Lake Howell High School, where he was a National Merit Scholarship Program finalist and a brain bowl team member; he graduated in 1990.

Gogulski entered Orlando College in 1990 to study computer science. In April 1992, while still a student there and living in Casselberry, Florida, he became the first person to be arrested by the Orange County Sheriff's Office for computer hacking. Police stated that he had stolen at least $30,000 of long-distance telephone services. Among the victims of the theft were the county government, a tutorial service at the University of Florida, and an auto dealership. Charged with one count of violating the Florida Communications Fraud Act, he pleaded guilty in Seminole County Circuit Court; under a plea agreement, he received two years of probation, but a formal ruling of guilt was withheld and no further charges were filed. He later lost interest in his studies and withdrew from school. Nevertheless, he went on to a ten-year career as a system administrator.

In 2004, Gogulski left the U.S. to teach English in Eastern Europe. He eventually ended up in Bratislava, Slovakia, where he became a translator, proofreader, and editor.

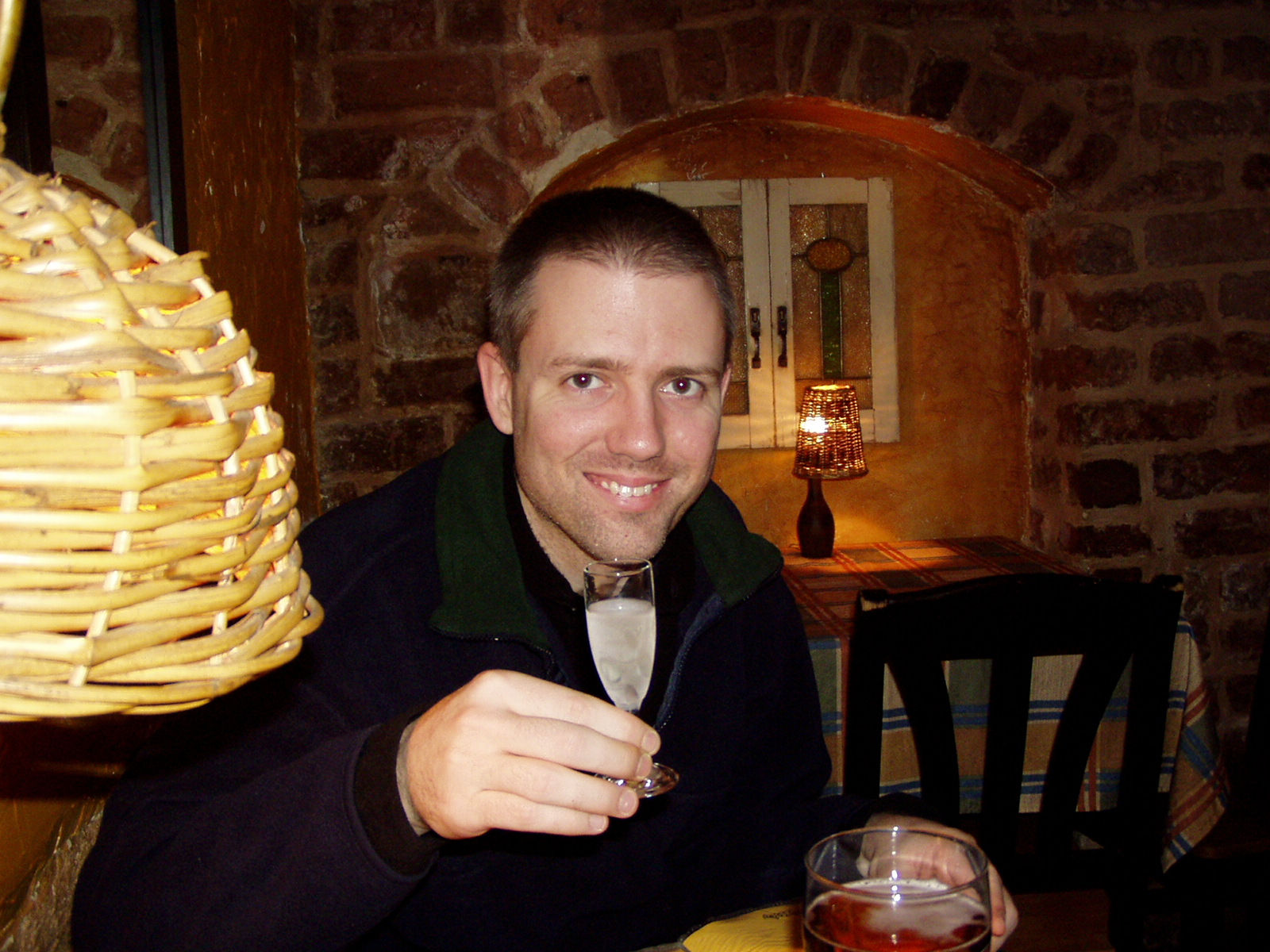
Mike Gogulski in Wrocław, Poland in 2004

== Renunciation of citizenship ==
Gogulski renounced his citizenship in December 2008, though his name did not appear in the Internal Revenue Service's Quarterly Publication of Individuals Who Have Chosen to Expatriate until February 2011. He was living in Slovakia at the time. After Gogulski renounced, the Slovak authorities issued a stateless person's travel document to him. He thus needs a United States visa in order to visit his mother. He states that he is eligible to apply for Slovak citizenship, but prefers to remain stateless. As a legal resident of Slovakia, he can travel freely throughout the Schengen Area. In 2012 he was denied a British visa, an issue which he attributed to the short remaining validity period of his travel document.

Gogulski stated that he renounced his citizenship in order to repudiate the American system, which he felt was the source of many wrongs in the world. Gogulski has stated that he hopes to start a mass movement of Americans giving up citizenship and making themselves stateless en masse. He receives occasional enquiries from others who are interested in following in his footsteps and becoming stateless themselves; he advises them to "understand all the implications" before they make the leap, pointing out that while he has faced few hardships due to his statelessness, others may find it more difficult due to their personal situations.

== Political activism ==
In 1999, Gogulski founded the Connecticut Cannabis Policy Forum, which aimed to remove all penalties for adult marijuana consumption. In 2010, Gogulski founded the Private Manning Support Network, which organised protests in support of Chelsea Manning (a U.S. soldier convicted of disclosing classified documents to WikiLeaks) and raised $50,000 to fund her legal defense.

== Bitcoin ==
As a software developer, Gogulski has contributed open source code on GitHub, including a PHP library for the decentralised digital currency bitcoin. He is also an active member of the online forum Bitcointalk.org. He operates the Bitcoin Laundry, a service which allows users to exchange their bitcoins for other bitcoins which have a different transaction history.
