= Kory Minor =

American football player (born 1976)

No. 4
- Position: Linebacker

Personal information
- Born: December 14, 1976 (age 49); Inglewood, California, U.S.

Career information
- High school: Bishop Amat Memorial (La Puente, California)
- College: Notre Dame
- NFL draft: 1999: 7th round, 234th overall pick

Career history
- Carolina Panthers (1999–2002)

Career NFL statistics
- Tackles: 23
- Stats at Pro Football Reference

Kory DeShaun Minor (born December 15, 1976) is an American former professional football player who was a linebacker in the National Football League (NFL). He played 30 games in four seasons for the Carolina Panthers. Minor was an outside linebacker playing college football for the Notre Dame Fighting Irish from 1995 to 1998, while recording 245 tackles (43.5 for loss) and five interceptions. He was a seventh-round pick in the 1999 NFL draft, selected 234th overall by the San Francisco 49ers.

A native of Inglewood, California, Minor attended Bishop Amat High School in La Puente, California, where he was a teammate of Daylon McCutcheon. He was twice named to the All-CIF Southern Section Division I team and had 20½ sacks as a senior while earning consensus All-America notice and being named Defensive Player of the Year by USA Today.

Minor is a former owner of multiple Domino's Pizza franchises in California. In the summer of 2009, he began appearing in Domino's American Legends pizza commercials. He promotes the Cali Chicken Bacon Ranch pizza in a face off against the Memphis BBQ Chicken pizza, whose promoter suggests that Minor "put some South in his mouth."

After selling his franchises, Minor founded Kory Minor Industries which is a training and development company for individuals and organizations.

Beginning in 2018, Minor coached high school football for St. Margaret's Episcopal School in San Juan Capistrano, California. In five seasons as head coach, Minor led the Tartans to four CIF-Southern Section playoff appearances, including a Division 9 runner-up finish in 2021. Minor stepped down after the following season, finishing his coaching stint with a record of 34–18. Since 2025, Minor has been the varsity football head coach at his alma mater Bishop Amat, leading the Lancers to a 7-5 record in his first season there.
