= Trevor Pryce =

American football player (born 1975)

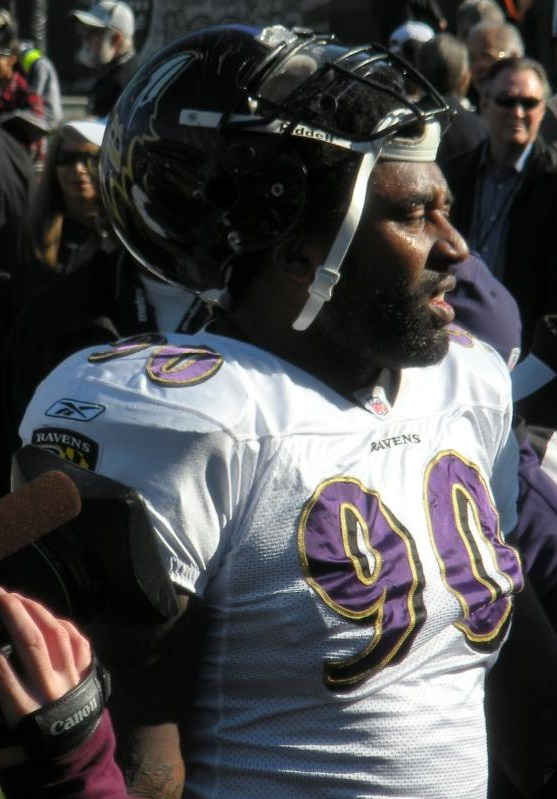
- Pryce with the Baltimore Ravens in 2010

No. 93, 90
- Position: Defensive end

Personal information
- Born: August 3, 1975 (age 51); Brooklyn, New York, U.S.
- Listed height: 6 ft 6 in (1.98 m)
- Listed weight: 290 lb (132 kg)

Career information
- High school: Lake Howell (Winter Park, Florida)
- College: Michigan; Clemson
- NFL draft: 1997: 1st round, 28th overall pick

Career history
- Denver Broncos (1997–2005); Baltimore Ravens (2006–2010); New York Jets (2010)

Awards and highlights
- 2× Super Bowl champion (XXXII, XXXIII); First-team All-Pro (1999); Second-team All-Pro (2001); 4× Pro Bowl (1999–2002); Denver Broncos 50th Anniversary Team; First-team All-ACC (1996)

Career NFL statistics
- Tackles: 448
- Sacks: 91
- Forced fumbles: 12
- Fumble recoveries: 4
- Interceptions: 2
- Defensive touchdowns: 1
- Stats at Pro Football Reference

Trevor Wesley Pryce II (born August 3, 1975) is an American writer and former professional football player who was a defensive end for 14 seasons in the National Football League (NFL). Pryce played college football for the University of Michigan before transferring to Clemson University. He was selected by the Denver Broncos in the first round of the 1997 NFL draft. After his football career, he began a career as a writer, creating the series Kulipari: An Army of Frogs.

== Early life ==
Born in Brooklyn, New York, Pryce attended Lake Howell High School in Winter Park, Florida, and was a standout in football and as a hurdler in track.

== College career ==
Pryce played defensive end for Clemson University during the 1996 season. He was a transfer from the University of Michigan. He decided to forgo his senior season to enter the NFL Draft.

== Professional career ==
=== Denver Broncos ===
Pryce was selected by the Denver Broncos in the first round (28th overall) in the 1997 NFL draft. In his rookie season he played in eight games and recorded 24 tackles and two sacks. He made his NFL debut on November 2 versus the Seattle Seahawks. In his second year with the Broncos, he started 15 out of the 16 games and made 43 tackles and a then career high 8.5 sacks. He was also a member of the Broncos' back-to-back championship teams, winning Super Bowl XXXII and Super Bowl XXXIII team. In the 1999 season he started in 15 games and recorded 46 tackles and a career-high 13 sacks. He also earned his first trip to the Pro Bowl. The following season, 2000, he started all 16 regular season games and finished the season with 46 tackles and 12 sacks. He was also voted to his second consecutive Pro Bowl. In 2001, he was voted to his third consecutive Pro Bowl after finishing the season with 41 tackles and seven sacks. The 2002 season saw Pryce voted to the Pro Bowl for the fourth year in a row after finishing the campaign with 46 tackles and nine sacks. In 2003, he started in all 16 games including his 100th career game and recorded 36 tackles and 8.5 sacks. The 2004 season was a frustrating one for Pryce as he only played in two games after surgery on a herniated disc in his lower back. In his last year with the Broncos, Pryce started 16 times and recorded 33 tackles and four sacks.

In 2009, although no longer a member of the franchise, Pryce was named to the Broncos' 50th Anniversary Team; he took out an ad in the Denver Post thanking fans for the honor.

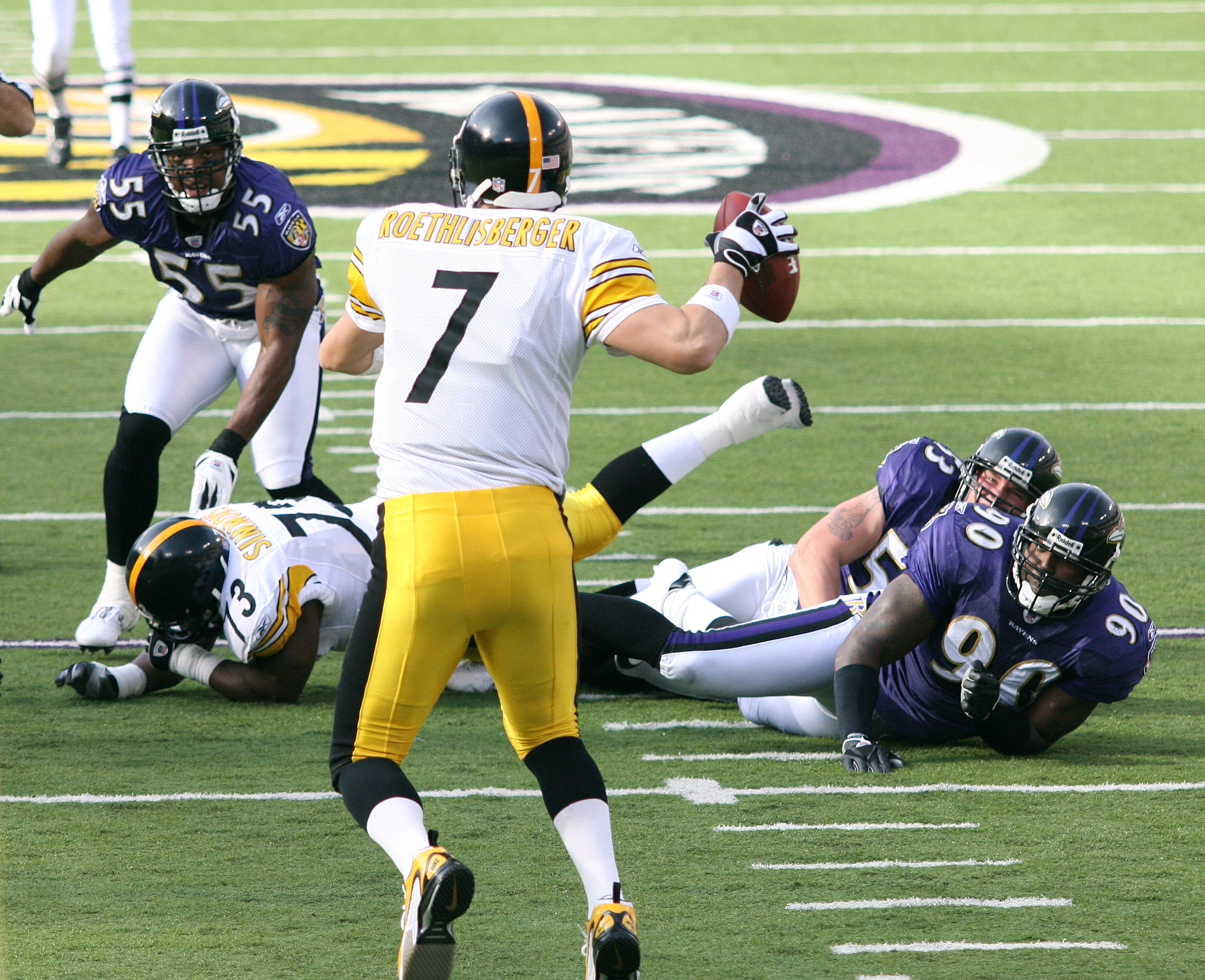
Trevor Pryce (90) playing against the Pittsburgh Steelers in 2006.

=== Baltimore Ravens ===
Pryce was signed by the Baltimore Ravens as a free agent on March 14, 2006. In his first season with the Ravens, he started in all 16 games and finished the season 47 tackles and 13 sacks which equaled his career-high. His play was a huge part of the Ravens' defense ranking No. 1 overall in 2006, and also had a franchise record of 60 regular season team sacks. In 2007, he made 15 tackles and two sacks, missing most of the season due to injury.

In the 2008 season, he made 27 tackles and 4.5 sacks.

In the 2009 season, he finished with 31 tackles, 6.5 sacks, and 1 forced fumble. He was not a full-time starter this year, splitting time with his 2007 replacement, Dwan Edwards.

On September 29, 2010, Pryce was released from the Baltimore Ravens to make room for defensive back Ken Hamlin.

=== New York Jets ===
On September 30, 2010, Pryce was signed by the New York Jets.

=== Retirement ===
After the 2010 AFC Championship Game, Pryce confirmed he was done playing football. In 2011, he officially retired.

=== NFL statistics ===
Year	Team	GP	COMB	TOTAL	AST	SACK	FF	FR	FR YDS	INT	IR YDS	AVG IR	LNG IR	TD	PD
1997	DEN	8	24	16	8	2.0	0	0	0	0	0	0	0	0	1
1998	DEN	16	43	30	13	8.5	0	0	0	1	1	1	1	0	2
1999	DEN	15	46	33	13	13.0	2	1	0	1	0	0	0	0	4
2000	DEN	16	46	33	13	12.0	2	1	0	0	0	0	0	0	5
2001	DEN	16	39	33	6	7.0	1	0	0	0	0	0	0	0	4
2002	DEN	16	46	40	6	9.0	1	1	0	0	0	0	0	0	1
2003	DEN	16	36	28	8	8.5	2	1	0	0	0	0	0	0	1
2004	DEN	2	2	1	1	0.0	0	0	0	0	0	0	0	0	0
2005	DEN	16	33	31	2	4.0	1	0	0	0	0	0	0	0	3
2006	BAL	16	47	37	10	13.0	2	0	0	0	0	0	0	0	2
2007	BAL	5	15	9	6	2.0	0	0	0	0	0	0	0	0	0
2008	BAL	16	27	17	10	4.5	0	0	0	0	0	0	0	0	2
2009	BAL	16	31	19	12	6.5	1	0	0	0	0	0	0	0	0
2010	BAL	3	0	0	0	0.0	0	0	0	0	0	0	0	0	0
2010	NYJ	10	4	3	1	1.0	0	0	0	0	0	0	0	0	0
Career		187	439	330	109	91.0	12	4	0	2	1	1	1	0	25

== Personal life ==
Pryce's sister, Nandi Pryce, is a former soccer player who played for the United States women's national team.

== Multimedia ==
In 2013 Pryce began a second career as a professional writer, publishing the first of his young adult series Kulipari: An Army of Frogs, with co-writer Joel Naftali and illustrator Sanford Greene, from Amulet Books. The series was adapted in 2016 into an original animated series, Kulipari: An Army of Frogs, by Netflix.

In June 2016 it was announced that Pryce was writing a sequel comic, with co-writer Joshua Starnes and illustrator Sonia Liao, set to pick up directly after the novels ended.

Pryce founded and operates The Outlook Company, an East Baltimore-based multimedia and live-action animation studio.
