= Bishop Amat Memorial High School =

American private high school

Location
- 14301 Fairgrove Avenue; La Puente, California; 34°3′15″N 117°57′54″W

Information
- Type: Private, Coeducational
- Religious affiliation: Roman Catholic
- Established: 1957
- President: Richard Beck
- Principal: Gabriel Escovar
- Teaching staff: 61.3 (on an FTE basis)
- Grades: 9-12
- Enrollment: 979 (2021-2022)
- Student to teacher ratio: 16.6
- Colors: Blue and gold
- Athletics conference: CIF Southern Section; Del Rey League
- Mascot: Lancer
- Newspaper: Lance
- Yearbook: Tusitala
- Tuition: 1 student= $10,835 per year 2 students- same family $18,370 per year($ 3,300 discount) 3 Students- same family $22,110 per year ($7,095 discount).
- Website: http://www.bishopamat.org

Bishop Amat Memorial High School is a co-ed Catholic high school serving the San Gabriel Valley in the Roman Catholic Archdiocese of Los Angeles, and was founded in 1957. The campus is located in La Puente, California, approximately 20 miles (32 km) east of downtown Los Angeles in Los Angeles County. The coeducational student body comprises approximately 1,000 students in grades 9 through 12.

== History ==
The school is named for the first Bishop of Monterey-Los Angeles, the Most Reverend Thaddeus Amat y Brusi, who served as the ordinary of Los Angeles from 1853 to 1878. He founded some of the first schools in Los Angeles and invited the Society of Saint Vincent de Paul to open St. Vincent's College, which was the predecessor to Loyola Marymount University. Bishop Amat Memorial High School was formally dedicated to his memory in October 1959.

== Academics ==
Bishop Amat offers Advanced Placement courses.

== Campus ==
The campus site has grown over the years with the present 200 and 500 wings added in 1959. The gymnasium was added in 1962, the stadium in 1965 and the 300 wing in 1966. In 1973, the school formally became co-educational, with a single administrative structure. A building dedicated to the performing arts was completed in 1982. Four classrooms, including a full computer lab, were completed in 1988. A second computer lab was added in 1993, a refurbished physics lab in 1994 and the Brutocao Library in 1995. In 2000, a new covered lunch structure was built completed with integrated sound system and bbq pit.

In 2002, the school undertook a major campus renovation with plans for the replacement of the Tate Duff Memorial gymnasium. On March 16, 2003, demolition commenced on the facility. A leveled site groundbreaking for the new facility was held on April 16, 2003, with Bishop Zavala conducting the ceremony. On May 16, 2004, the living Rosary was held as the first activity in the new facility. The new Student Activity Center houses a main pavilion which seats 1600 spectators for Masses, assemblies, rallies and basketball and volleyball contests. New locker rooms for boys (down stairs) and girls (upstairs) are included as well as a lunchroom, dance studio, weight room facility and athletic and coaching offices. An equipment room and seminar room enhanced the many uses of the facility. In 2008 the facility was named in honor of Bishop Amat's first President, Monsignor Aidan Carroll who developed the concept of the center and raised the money to pay its cost.

== Sports ==
Bishop Amat participates in the Southern Section of the California Interscholastic Federation, fielding 58 teams in 22 sports,

Amat Lancers have won five state championships - girls' basketball (2), Girls Cross Country (1), Boys Cross Country (1) and Boys Soccer (1).

The Lancer boys' soccer team won the state championship in 2025. The Lancer girls' basketball team won the state championship in 2005 and 2006. The girls' cross country team won the state championship in 2015. The boys' cross country team won the state championship in 2014. Both the Boys and Girls Cross Country teams compete regularly in the Nike Portland and Cross Nationals in Portland, Oregon.

The school was selected as national champion by Collegiate Baseball Magazine twice (in 2001 and 2002). As of 2014 It was the only school to have been selected twice. The baseball program has won the National Classic game four times.

The Bishop Amat football program won the CIF-SS championships in 1961, 1970, 1971, 1992, 1995. The 1992 Lancer football team won the Reebok Bowl which was the first-ever championship between the CIF-Southern Section champion and the Los Angeles CIF city champion.

== Notable alumni ==
- Troy Auzenne, NFL player, Class of 1987
- Jeff Banks, college football coach
- Eric Bieniemy, NFL player and coach, Class of 1987
- Caprice Bourret, Model, fashion designer and actress, Class of 1989
- Ralph Brown, NFL player, Class of 1996
- Ron Brown, NFL player
- France Córdova, president, Purdue University, Class of 1965
- Jeanne Córdova, writer and LGBT activist
- Charlene Mae Gonzales Bonnin-Muhlach, Miss Philippines in 1994; Miss Universe, top 6 finalist
- Dan Haren, MLB pitcher, 3-time All-Star, Class of 1998
- Pat Haden, USC and NFL quarterback, sportscaster, USC Athletic Director, Class of 1971
- John Jackson, NFL player, sportscaster
- Brian Kelly, professional football player for Edmonton Eskimos, 1979-1987; elected to Canadian Football Hall of Fame 1991), Class of 1974
- Mike Lamb, MLB player, Class of 1993
- Daylon McCutcheon, NFL player
- Paul McDonald, NFL player, quarterback for USC's 1978 national championship team
- John McKay, Jr., USC assistant athletic director, NFL player, son of football coach John McKay), Class of 1971
- Tamara Mello, actress
- Kory Minor, NFL player
- Carlos Pascual, U.S. Ambassador to Mexico, Special Envoy and Coordinator for International Energy Affairs, Class of 1976
- P. J. Pilittere, baseball coach
- Sheldon Price, NFL player, Class of 2009
- William Robinson, NFL player
- Mazio Royster, NFL player
- Rio Ruiz, MLB player, Class of 2012
- Brian Russell, NFL player, Class of 1996
- Maria Sachs, member of Florida State Senate, Class of 1967
- John Sciarra, NFL player, All-American quarterback at UCLA, played in 1976 Rose Bowl in which UCLA upset favored Ohio State, Class of 1972, inducted into College Football Hall of Fame 2014
- Scheana Shay, actress, Class of 2002
- Ryan Smith, NFL player, cornerback for University of Florida national championship team
- Tyler Vaughns, professional football player, Class of 2016
- Danny Walton, MLB player, Class of 1965
- Adrian Young, football player
- David Denson, first professional baseball player to come out as gay
- Daniel Zamora, baseball player
