= Tam Hopkins =

American football player (born 1978)

No. 65
- Position: Guard

Personal information
- Born: March 22, 1978 (age 48); Winter Park, Florida, U.S.
- Listed height: 6 ft 4 in (1.93 m)
- Listed weight: 315 lb (143 kg)

Career information
- High school: Lake Howell (Winter Park)
- College: Ohio State
- NFL draft: 2001: undrafted

Career history
- Washington Redskins (2001)*; Jacksonville Jaguars (2001)*; New York Giants (2002); Minnesota Vikings (2004)*; Cologne Centurions (2005); Washington Redskins (2005)*
- * Offseason or practice squad member only

Career NFL statistics
- Games played: 16
- Games started: 1
- Stats at Pro Football Reference

Tam Hopkins (born March 22, 1978) is an American former professional football player who was a guard in the National Football League (NFL) for one season. Hopkins also played for the NFL Europe's Cologne Centurions for one season. He played college football for the Ohio State Buckeyes.
