= Delon Washington =

American football player (born c.1976)

Career information
- High school: Kimball HS (Dallas)
- College: USC (1994–1997)

Delon Washington (born c. 1976) is an American former football running back. After attending Kimball High School in Dallas, he played for the USC Trojans from 1994 to 1997. He led the team in rushing in 1995 with 1,109 yards and again in 1997 with 444 yards. Washington was suspended for the first three games of the 1996 season for an undisclosed "ethical violation." During his time at USC, Washington totaled 2,025 rushing yards and scored 11 rushing touchdowns.

== College statistics ==
Rushing and receiving
Season	School	Games	Rush Att	Rush Yds	Avg	Rec	Rec Yds	TD
1994	USC	11	19	153	8.1	0	0	1
1995	USC	11	220	1058	4.8	5	81	5
1996	USC	12	112	370	3.3	5	25	2
1997	USC	11	125	444	3.6	5	14	3
Career	USC	45	476	2025	4.3	15	120	11
