= Lake Howell High School =

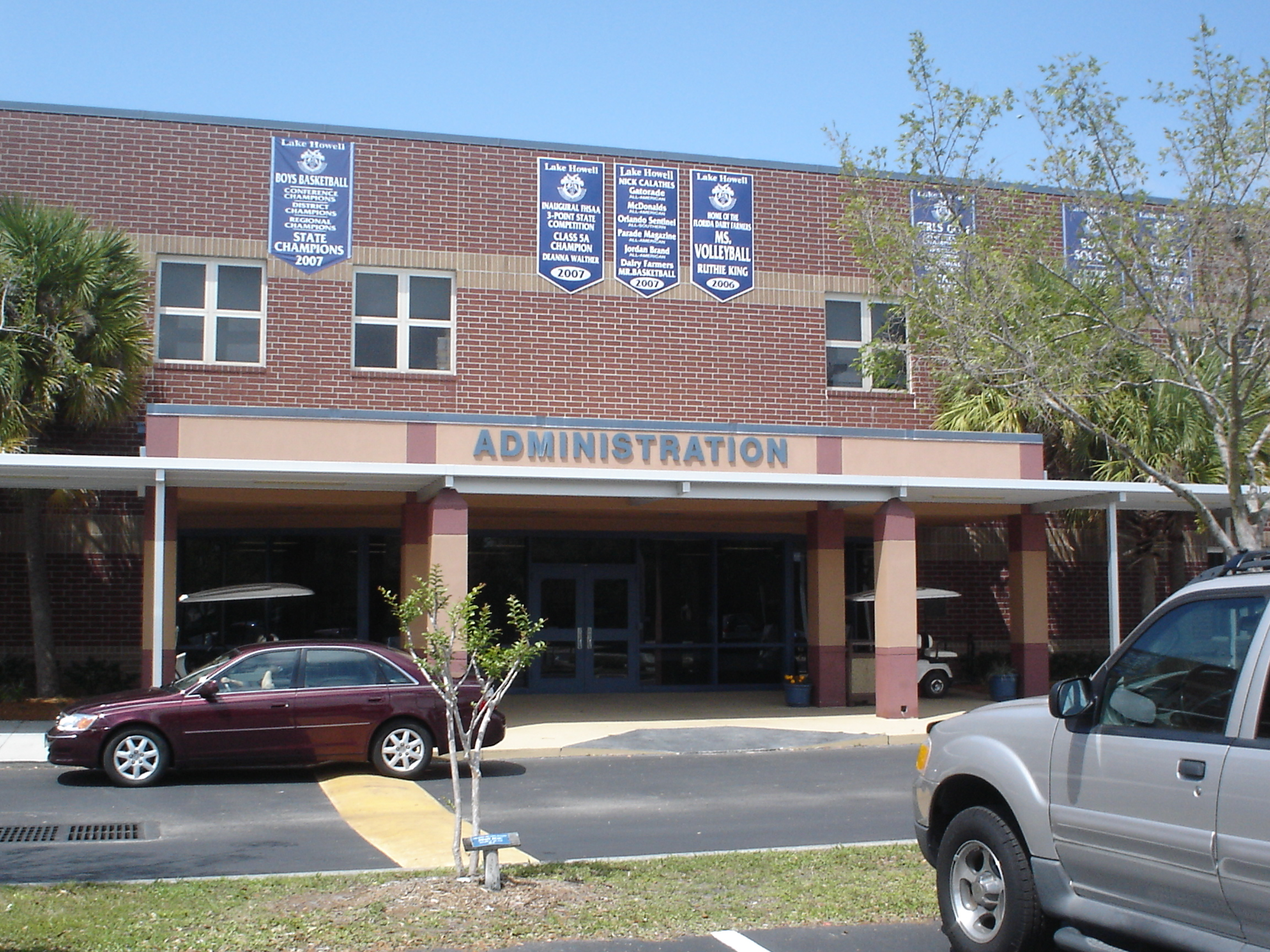

Location
- 4200 Dike Rd; Winter Park, Seminole, Florida 32792; United States; 28°38′14″N 81°16′23″W

Information
- Type: Public
- Established: 1974
- School district: Seminole County Public Schools
- Principal: Michael Howard
- Teaching staff: 102.40 (FTE)
- Enrollment: 2,201 (2023-2024)
- Student to teacher ratio: 21.49
- Color: Silver Navy Blue
- Athletics: Yes
- Athletics conference: Seminole Athletic Conference
- Mascot: Howard Silverstone Hawkington III (Howie the Hawk)
- Team name: Lake Howell Silverhawks
- Rivals: Winter Springs High School, Oviedo High School (historical), Hagerty High School
- Yearbook: WINGS
- Feeder schools: Tuskawilla Middle School, South Seminole Academy
- Website: School website

Lake Howell High School is a comprehensive four-year high school in Central Florida, US. The school is in Seminole County with a Winter Park, Florida address, and serves parts of Casselberry, Fern Park, Goldenrod, Oviedo, Winter Park, and Winter Springs.

The school's first principal, Richard L. Evans, was the first African-American principal in Seminole County since schools were integrated in the late 1960s.

== History ==
Lake Howell High School was established in 1974 to serve the rapidly growing suburban areas of southern Seminole County. Built to relieve overcrowding at Lyman High School and Oviedo High School, Lake Howell quickly established its own distinct identity, centered around academic achievement, performing arts, and athletics, adopting the Silver Hawk as its official mascot.

Throughout its decades of operation, the school has undergone significant facility upgrades to support expanding student enrollments and modern educational needs. Notably, during the 1996-1997 academic year, the entire Lake Howell student body, faculty, and staff temporarily relocated to the newly constructed facility that would later become Winter Springs High School. This temporary shift allowed the original Dike Road campus to undergo comprehensive campus-wide modernization and structural renovations before students returned to a fully updated home campus the following year.

Over the years, Lake Howell High School has evolved into a comprehensive educational hub within Seminole County Public Schools.

In recent years, the campus has continued to transform through major facility upgrades. In 2023, the school completed a multi-billion dollar construction project featuring a modern two-story classroom building designed specifically for STEM-focused instruction and career-technical education programs.

Alongside this academic expansion, the school is constructing a dedicated new auditorium building to support its renowned performing arts programs and accommodate the Lake Howell Theatre Company, Silver Regiment Marching Band, along with the choir and dance programs.

== Sports ==
Lake Howell High School sponsors a variety of sports teams including football, cross country, basketball, volleyball, golf, bowling, track and field, tennis, lacrosse, wrestling, swimming, water polo, baseball, softball, soccer, weightlifting, cheer-leading, beach volleyball, and flag football.

Field sports play at Richard L. Evans Field, located on campus, named after the school's first Principal.

Water sports play at the Lake Howell High School Aquatic Center, with an Olympic size swimming pool, funded and built by a $4 million dollar donation from an anonymous Lake Howell High School alumnus.

== Notable alumni ==
- Brian Acton, co-founder of WhatsApp and Signal Foundation
- Malik Blade, professional wrestler
- Nick Calathes, NBA and international basketball player
- Pat Calathes, basketball player for Israeli Basketball Super League, 2013 Israeli Basketball Premier League MVP
- Geoff Castellucci, singer, vocal bass of A cappella group VoicePlay
- Carlos Cortes, baseball player in the Athletics organization
- Sierra Deaton, co-winner of 2013 season of The X Factor as part of duo Alex & Sierra
- Brian Effron “Fro”, producer, songwriter, guitarist of Last Winter rock band
- Earl Elkins Jr., singer, former high tenor of A cappella group VoicePlay
- Mike Gogulski (1990), activist and hacker who voluntarily made himself stateless in 2008
- Tam Hopkins, former NFL guard
- Christian Jones, linebacker for Detroit Lions
- Mykal Kilgore, actor, singer/songwriter, former member of A cappella group VoicePlay
- Tao Lin, author
- Jamie Linden, screenwriter, producer, and director
- Brandon Marshall, former NFL wide receiver
- Dave Martinez, former MLB player who managed the Washington Nationals during their 2019 World Series Championship
- Kawika Mitchell, former NFL linebacker for Buffalo Bills
- Chandler Parsons, former NBA player
- Scott Porter, actor, former vocal percussionist of VoicePlay
- Nandi Pryce, former soccer player
- Trevor Pryce, former NFL defensive end for Denver Broncos and Baltimore Ravens
- Chuck Scott, former NFL wide receiver
- Marquette Smith, former NFL running back
- Eddie Taubensee, MLB pro baseball player
- Dahvie Vanity (2003), lead vocalist of electronic group Blood on the Dance Floor
