= Pat Calathes =

Greek-American basketball player

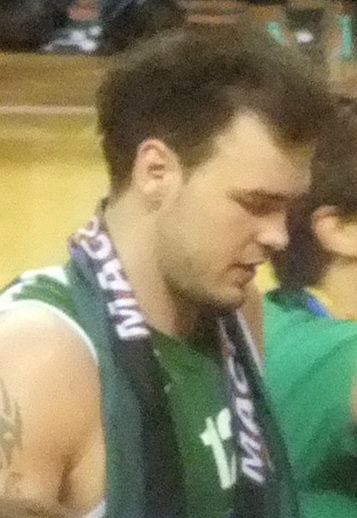
- Calathes with Maccabi Haifa in 2013

Personal information
- Born: December 12, 1985 (age 40) Casselberry, Florida, U.S.
- Listed height: 6 ft 10 in (2.08 m)
- Listed weight: 230 lb (104 kg)

Career information
- High school: Lake Howell (Winter Park, Florida)
- College: Saint Joseph's (2004–2008)
- NBA draft: 2008: undrafted
- Playing career: 2008–2017
- Position: Small forward / power forward

Career history
- 2008–2010: Maroussi
- 2010–2011: Kolossos Rodou
- 2011–2012: Panathinaikos
- 2012–2013: Maccabi Haifa
- 2013–2016: Astana
- 2016: Panathinaikos
- 2017: Cantù

Career highlights
- Greek Cup winner (2012); Greek League All-Star (2011); Israeli Super League champion (2013); Israeli Super League Finals MVP (2013); Israeli Super League Quintet (2013); 2× Kazakh League champion (2014, 2015); Kazakh Cup winner (2014); Kazakh Cup All-Cup Team (2014); First-team All-Atlantic 10 (2008); Robert V. Geasey Trophy co-winner (2008)

Patrick Sean Calathes (Greek: Πατρίκιος Σον "Πατ" Καλάθης, born on December 12, 1985) is a Greek-American former professional basketball player. At a height of 6 ft 10 in (2.08 m) tall, he played at both the small forward and power forward positions. He was the 2013 Israeli Basketball Premier League Finals MVP.

== High school career ==
Calathes attended Lake Howell High School, in Winter Park, Florida, where he played high school basketball. He began high school as a wiry 5 ft 11 in (1.80 m) tall point guard, but he would eventually grow to 6 ft 10 in (2.08 m) by his senior year.

== College career ==
After graduating from high school, Calathes would go on to play college basketball for the Saint Joseph's Hawks, at Saint Joseph's University, in Philadelphia. At St. Joe's, he saw limited playing time as a freshman, and then played as a key substitute for the team, during his sophomore season.

It was not until his junior season, during which he averaged 13.9 points per game and 7.1 rebounds per game, that he began to fully regain the physical and athletic abilities that he possessed before his growth spurt. He increased his per game averages to 17.5 points and 7.5 rebounds, in his senior year, and teamed up with center Ahmad Nivins, to lead the Hawks to the 2008 Atlantic 10 title game, and the Hawks' first NCAA Men's Division I Basketball Championship Tournament appearance since 2004. SJU would lose to the University of Oklahoma's men's basketball team, the Oklahoma Sooners, in the opening round.

Although he was listed as a small forward for the Saint Joseph's Hawks, his versatility allowed him to play multiple positions throughout his college career. Calathes ranks 27th all-time on the Saint Joseph's University's career points list, with 1,251 points scored. He also is 22nd all-time in the school's history, with 630 career rebounds. He is one of 26 players in school history to score 1,000 points and grab 500 rebounds in their career.

== Professional career ==
Many NBA mock drafts, including DraftExpress.com, had included Calathes as a draftee in their 2008 NBA draft mock draft boards. He was projected to be drafted as high as the late first round, but he was most frequently projected to be drafted in the mid-second round. However, he went undrafted. Because of his unique combination of height and guard skills, Calathes continues to intrigue a number of NBA teams, despite not having been drafted.

In the year 2008, Calathes began his professional basketball career when he signed a 3-year contract with the Greek League club Maroussi. In 2010, Calathes moved to the Greek League club Kolossos Rodou. He joined the EuroLeague club Panathinaikos in 2011.

He joined the Israeli League club Maccabi Hafia in 2012, and he was a key player in the team's successful 2012–13 season. He was named to the Israeli League's All-First Team. He also helped lead the club to win the Israeli League championship, as he was named the MVP of the Israeli League Final.

From 2013 to 2016, he played with Astana of the VTB United League. On August 1, 2016, it was announced that Calathes had returned to Panathinaikos. On January 4, 2017, he left Panathinaikos, and signed with the Italian League club Pallacanestro Cantù, for the rest of the season.

On December 2, 2017, Calathes announced his retirement from playing professional club basketball and became a Basketball agent.

=== The Basketball Tournament (TBT) ===
In the summer of 2017, Calathes played in The Basketball Tournament on ESPN, with Pedro's Posse. He scored fifteen points in their loss in the first round to Team 23, by a score of 107–92.

== National team career ==
Calathes was a member of the senior men's Greek national team in 2011.

== Personal life ==
Pat Calathes' younger brother, Nick, was the primary point guard for the Florida Gators men's basketball team. The Calatheses led their respective college teams in scoring during the 2007–08 college basketball season.

Calathes holds a Greek passport thanks to his descent from his grandparents, who emigrated to Florida from Lemnos. His mother is Irish.

In 2014, Patrick's ex-wife, Mary, gave birth to the couple's first child Sienna. With his current partner, in 2022 Patrick Jr. was born and their most recent child in 2025 is Avery Grace

== Awards and accomplishments ==
=== High school ===
- 2× Florida State Championship Final Four: (2003, 2004)

=== College ===
- All-Atlantic-10 Third Team: (2007)
- 4× Atlantic-10 Player of the Week
- All-Atlantic-10 First Team: (2008)
- 7× Big 5 Player of the Week
- All-Big 5 Team: (2008)
- Big 5 Co-Player of the Year: (2008)
- Inducted into Big 5 Hall of Fame: (2019)
- Inducted into St. Joseph's University Hall of Fame: (2019)

=== Professional ===
- Greek League All-Star: (2011)
- Greek Cup Winner: (2012)
- Israeli Super League Quintet: (2013)
- Israeli Super League Champion: (2013)
- Israeli Super League Finals MVP: (2013)
- Kazakh Cup Winner: (2014)
- Kazakh Cup All-Cup Team: (2014)
- 2× Kazakh League Champion: (2014, 2015)
- Kazakh League All-Kazakh Team: (2016)
