= Toby Sheers =

American football player (born 1979)

Profile
- Position: Punter

Personal information
- Born: November 1978 (age 47)
- Listed height: 6 ft 2 in (1.88 m)
- Listed weight: 170 lb (77 kg)

Career information
- High school: Lake County High School (Leadville, Colorado)
- College: Colorado Mesa Mavericks

Tobias Daniel Sheers (born November 1978) is an American former college football player from Colorado who was nationally recognized as a USA-Today High School All-American punter in 1996 and later played collegiate football at Mesa State College (now Colorado Mesa University).

== Early life ==
Sheers is a native of Leadville, Colorado, where he attended Lake County High School. He participated in high school football as a specialist, competing primarily as a punter and kicker.

He averaged 44.5 yards on 32 punts as a senior. Sheers averaged 48.5 yards per punt as a junior and 48.3 yards per punt as a sophomore. His average hang time was 4.3 seconds.

In addition to All-American honors, Sheers earned All-State honors as a senior.

== College career ==
Sheers went on to play college football at Mesa State College in Grand Junction, Colorado, turning down offers to play at larger schools including the University of Colorado who wanted him to walk-on.

In 1997, Sheers earned Second Team All-Conference honors as a kicker, recognizing his performance within the Rocky Mountain Athletic Conference. He converted 11 of 13 field goals and 25 extra points and averaged 34.8 yards per punt on 6 attempts.

As a senior in 2000, Sheers converted one field goal and 14 extra points and averaged 34.9 yards per punt on 13 attempts.

As a graduate student in 2001, Sheers converted one extra point.

== Post-football life ==
Following graduation, Sheers enlisted in the United States Marine Corps serving three tours in Iraq. Afterwards, he joined the Leadville Police Department as an officer.
