= Daylon McCutcheon =

American football player and coach (born 1976)

Profile
- Position: Cornerback

Personal information
- Born: December 9, 1976 (age 49); Los Angeles, California, U.S.
- Listed height: 5 ft 10 in (1.78 m)
- Listed weight: 190 lb (86 kg)

Career information
- High school: Bishop Amat Memorial (La Puente, California)
- College: USC
- NFL draft: 1999: 3rd round, 62nd overall pick

Career history

Playing
- Cleveland Browns (1999–2006)

Coaching
- Bishop Amat Memorial (2007–2014) Defensive coordinator & cornerbacks coach; New York Jets (2015–2017) Assistant defensive backs coach; Bishop Amat Memorial (2018–2021) Defensive coordinator & cornerbacks coach

Awards and highlights
- 2× First-team All-Pac-10 (1996, 1998)

Career NFL statistics
- Total tackles: 431
- Sacks: 7
- Forced fumbles: 7
- Pass deflections: 53
- Interceptions: 12
- Defensive touchdowns: 2
- Stats at Pro Football Reference

Daylon Anthony McCutcheon (born December 9, 1976) is an American former professional football player and coach. He was a cornerback for seven seasons for the Cleveland Browns of the National Football League (NFL) and later was an assistant coach for the New York Jets.

== Early life ==
McCutcheon played high school football at Bishop Amat Memorial High School in La Puente, California under the direction of then-head coach Mark Paredes. As a senior, he rushed for 2,456 yards in 1994; however he chose to play cornerback in college because his pro prospects were considered better at that position.

== College career ==
McCutcheon played college football at the University of Southern California. Although he played primarily on defense, the Trojans occasionally used him as a receiver due to his overall talent. Following his senior year, he was named All-American second-team by The Sporting News and All-Pac-10 first-team. He was also a semifinalist for the Jim Thorpe Award.

== Professional career ==
Pre-draft measurables
Height	Weight	Arm length	Hand span	40-yard dash	10-yard split	20-yard split	20-yard shuttle	Three-cone drill	Vertical jump	Broad jump	Bench press
5 ft 8 3/4 in (1.75 m)	180 lb (82 kg)	30 1/4 in (0.77 m)	9 1/8 in (0.23 m)	4.52 s	1.55 s	2.62 s	4.35 s	7.21 s	36.0 in (0.91 m)	9 ft 9 in (2.97 m)	13 reps
All values from NFL Combine

McCutcheon was drafted in the third round of the 1999 NFL Draft with the 62nd overall pick. He played in 103 games with 96 starts and accumulated 463 tackles, 7 sacks, 12 interceptions, 63 pass breakups, and 8 forced fumbles for the Browns before being released on March 9, 2007.

== Coaching career ==
Beginning in 2007, McCutcheon began coaching at his former high school.

=== New York Jets ===
McCutcheon was named the New York Jets' assistant defensive backs coach on January 29, 2015. On January 16, 2018, it was announced that McCutcheon would not be retained as the assistant defensive backs coach for the 2018 season.

=== Return to Bishop Amat ===
McCutcheon returned to his high school alma mater as a cornerbacks coach from 2018 until his son graduated from the school in 2021.

== Personal life ==
McCutcheon's father, Lawrence McCutcheon, was an all-pro running back who set the since-broken Los Angeles Rams career rushing record (6,186 yards) and played in Super Bowl XIV. Daylon's son, Dyson McCutcheon, plays for the Washington Huskies.
