= Kiefer Ravena =

Filipino basketball player (born 1993)

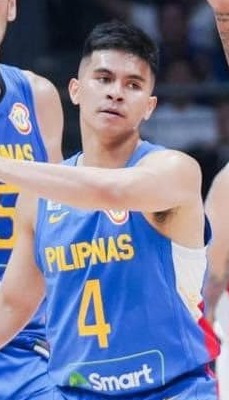
- Ravena in 2023

No. 11 – Ryukyu Golden Kings
- Position: Point guard
- League: B.League

Personal information
- Born: October 27, 1993 (age 33) Iloilo City, Philippines
- Listed height: 6 ft 0 in (1.83 m)
- Listed weight: 180 lb (82 kg)

Career information
- High school: Ateneo (Quezon City)
- College: Ateneo (2011-2015)
- PBA draft: 2017: 1st round, 2nd overall pick
- Drafted by: NLEX Road Warriors
- Playing career: 2017–present

Career history
- 2017: Alab Pilipinas
- 2017–2021: NLEX Road Warriors
- 2021–2024: Shiga Lakestars/Lakes
- 2024–2026: Yokohama B-Corsairs
- 2026–present: Ryukyu Golden Kings

Career highlights
- PBA All-Star (2018); 2× UAAP champion (2011, 2012); 2× UAAP Most Valuable Player (2014, 2015); 3× UAAP Mythical Team (2011, 2014, 2015); UAAP Rookie of the Year (2011); FilOil Flying V Cup champion (2011); FilOil Flying V Cup MVP (2011); 3× Flying V Cup Mythical Team (2011, 2012, 2013); Unigames champion (2014); Unigames MVP (2014); Unigames Mythical Team (2014); Republica Cup Champion (2016); PCCL Mythical Team (2012); PCBL MVP (2016); PCBL Mythical Team (2016); College Basketball Awards MVP (2011); 4× College Basketball Awards Mythical Team (2011, 2012, 2014, 2016); FIBA Asia U-18 Championship Mythical Team (2010)

Kiefer Isaac Crisologo Ravena (/ˈkiːfər/; born October 27, 1993) is a Filipino professional basketball player who last played for the Ryukyu Golden Kings of the B.League. Ravena played for the Ateneo Blue Eagles of the UAAP during his college days. He plays the point guard position. Ravena is known for being one of the first players to utilize the Pinoy step, which is increasingly being used by NBA players.

The son of former PBA player Bong Ravena, Ravena enjoyed a successful high school basketball career at the Ateneo de Manila High School in Loyola Heights, Quezon City where he was recognized as one of the top high school basketball players in the Philippines. Ravena is a three-time UAAP Juniors Champion (2008, 2009 and 2010), two-time UAAP Juniors Finals MVP (2009 and 2010), two-time UAAP Juniors Mythical Team member (2009 and 2010), one-time FIBA Asia U-18 Mythical Team member (2010), two-time UAAP Seniors Champion (2011 and 2012) and three-time UAAP Seniors Mythical Team member (2011, 2014 and 2015). He is also the UAAP Season 74 Rookie of the Year and the UAAP Season 77 and 78 Most Valuable Player recipient. At the 2011, 2013, 2015, 2017 and 2019 Southeast Asian Games, he won gold medals as a member of Gilas Pilipinas.

== Early life ==
Kiefer Ravena was born on October 27, 1993, in Iloilo. Ravena's father, Bong Ravena played for the UE Red Warriors and was the 1992 PBA Rookie of the year while his mother, Mozzy Crisologo-Ravena, was a volleyball player who used to play for the UST Golden Tigresses and the Philippines women's national volleyball team. He is the eldest of three siblings. His younger brother Thirdy Ravena is also a professional basketball player for the Toyama Grouses in the Japanese B.League and his younger sister Dani played volleyball for the Ateneo Lady Eagles and in the Premier Volleyball League. In June 2016, he graduated from the Ateneo de Manila University with a Bachelor's degree in Communications Technology Management. During his guesting on the radio show, The Morning Rush, he revealed that he was named after his father's favorite actor, Kiefer Sutherland.

== High school career ==
=== Ateneo Blue Eaglets ===
Ravena attended the Ateneo de Manila High School and was included on the Ateneo Blue Eaglets team in the UAAP juniors division. He was the first person to play on Team A of the Ateneo Blue Eaglets during his freshman year. He led the Blue Eaglets to 3 consecutive championships during his last 3 years with the team, against the FEU Baby Tamaraws during season 71, the DLSZ Junior Archers in season 72, and the UST Tiger Cubs during season 73. While he was still eligible for the juniors level he won 2 consecutive Finals MVP awards and was part of the Juniors Mythical Team for 2 consecutive years.

== College career ==
=== Ateneo Blue Eagles ===
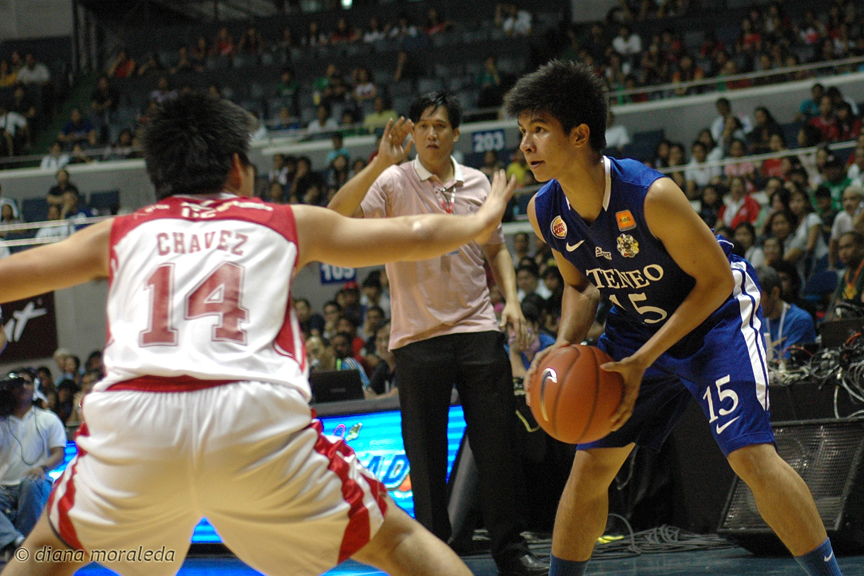
Ravena during his rookie year against the UE Red Warriors.

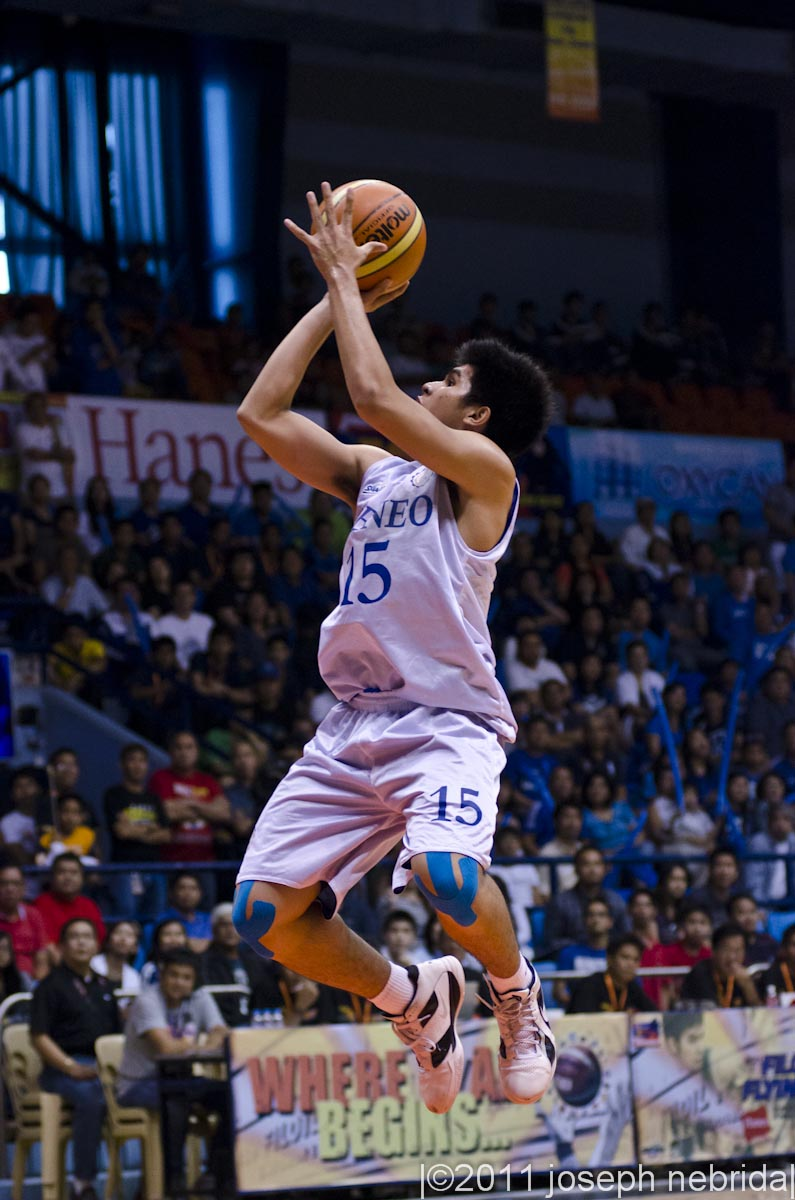
Ravena with Ateneo. 2011.

Soon after the 73rd season of the UAAP ended, many schools wanted Ravena to play for their Seniors basketball team but he eventually decided to stay with Ateneo and play on their seniors men's basketball team, the Ateneo Blue Eagles.

During his stay with Ateneo, Ravena have led the Blue Eagles to four Final Four appearances in 2011, 2012, 2014, and 2015 including two UAAP championships in 2011 and 2012. He also led Ateneo into two PCCL runner-up finishes in 2011 and 2012. Aside from that, he also led the Blue Eagles to their first championship in the Filoil Flying V Preseason Hanes Cup in 2011 while leading them to a 3rd-place finish in the same tournament the following year. In 2014, Ravena led Ateneo to their 3rd basketball championship in Unigames.

He has also won many accolades while playing for the Blue Eagles, which includes the 2011 Filoil Flying V Preseason Hanes Cup Most Valuable Player Award, UAAP Season 74 Rookie of the Year, UAAP Season 75 Todo Bigay Player of the Year, UAAP Season 77 and 78 Most Valuable Player Award, and the 2014 Unigames Most Valuable Player Award. He is also a three-time UAAP Mythical Five member in 2011, 2014, and 2015, two-time FilOil Mythical Five member in 2011 and 2012, one-time PCCL Mythical Five member in 2012, and one-time Unigames Mythical Five member in 2014.

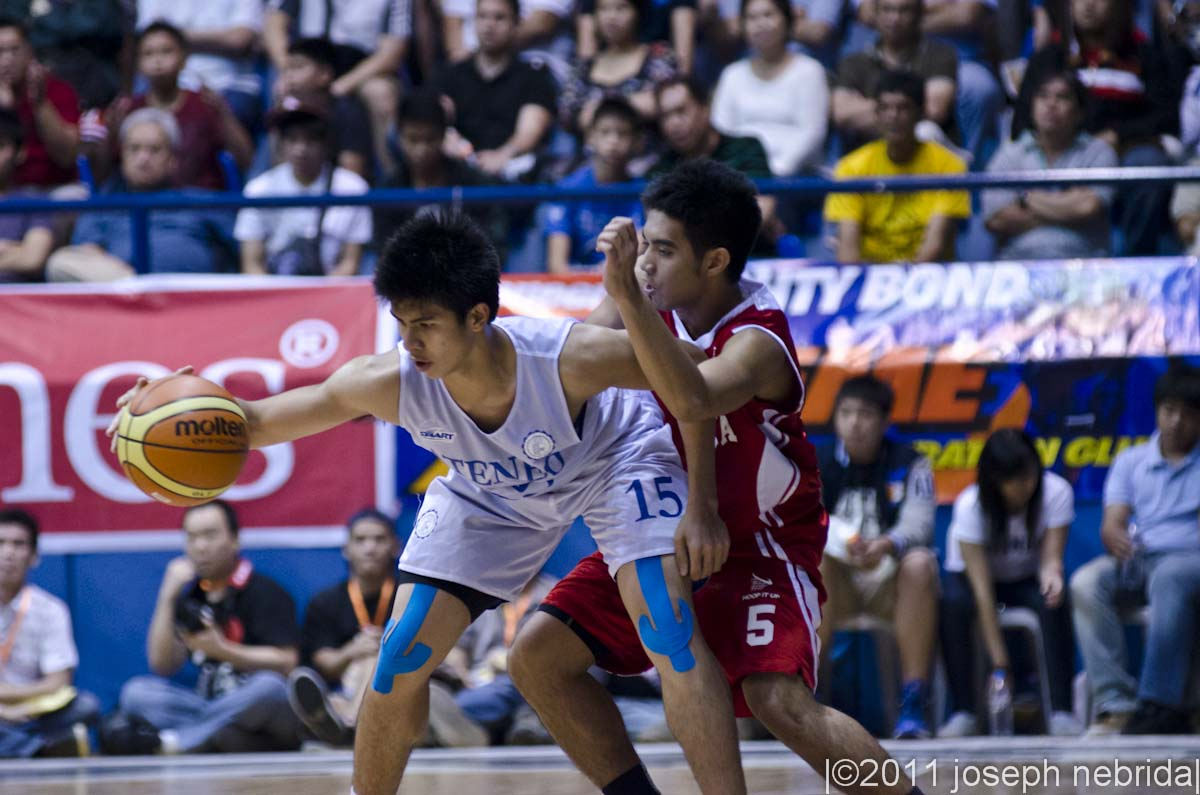
Ravena guarded by Melo Lim of the San Beda Red Lions.

Aside from the championships and the individual accolades, Ravena also broke some records in the UAAP. On his first ever Ateneo-La Salle game in the UAAP Seniors Division, Kiefer has scored his then-UAAP seniors career best of 24 points (22 in the first half alone) which is at that time the second highest individual scoring output in a first half of a game since Dylan Ababou scored 23 points in 2009. In their Final Four match-up against the DLSU Green Archers in Season 75, Ravena had his then-UAAP seniors career best with 28 points (16 in the payoff period) to go along with 12 rebounds and 7 assists. On August 10, 2014, he recorded his new career high of 38 points on their come-from-behind overtime win against UE before that his career high was 29 points on their second win of Season 77 against their bitter rival La Salle. The 38 points that he made became the then-second highest points made by a single player in the Final Four era next to the 43 points made by the former NU Bulldog Jeff Napa back in 2002, currently it is the fourth highest scoring output by a single player when Napa's record was surpassed by the 49 points made by UE's Alvin Pasaol and DLSU's Ben Mbala scored 39 points both in 2017. During UAAP Season 77, he also set a new record of most free throws taken by single player in a single game with 25 on their game against UE, he made 19 free throws out of that 25, the previous record was 19 set by another Blue Eagle Chris Tiu in 2008, where he only missed two freethrows. His 77.64 statistical points in season 77 is the highest recorded statistical points made by a single player in one season until it was surpassed by the 92.43 statistical points of La Salle's Mbala in 2016. His 11 assists in their second-round game against the Adamson Falcons in season 78 is the second most assist done by an individual player in the UAAP since 2003, only behind by the 12 assists made by Terrence Romeo against the UE Red Warriors in 2013, tied along with UE's Philip Manalang against the FEU Tamaraws and UP's Juan Gómez de Liaño against UE in 2018 Ravena recorded his season high and second career best of 32 points (21 points in the 1st quarter and 26 points in the first half alone) to go along with 3 rebounds and 2 assists on their second round win against the NU Bulldogs in season 78. His 26 points on the first half is the most points scored by any player in the UAAP, it broke the previous record held by Dylan Ababou who scored 23 points on season 72. Also, Ravena is only the third Atenean and 10th player in UAAP history to win back-to-back MVP awards.

=== UAAP career statistics ===
Legend
GP	Games played	GS	Games started	MPG	Minutes per game
FG%	Field goal percentage	3P%	3-point field goal percentage	FT%	Free throw percentage
RPG	Rebounds per game	APG	Assists per game	SPG	Steals per game
BPG	Blocks per game	PPG	Points per game	**Bold**	Career high

†	Denotes seasons in which Ravena won a UAAP championship
	Led the league

Year	Team	GP	GS	MPG	FG%	3P%	FT%	RPG	APG	SPG	BPG	PPG
2011–12 †	Ateneo	17	16	27.69	.448	.156	.712	4.06	3.19	1.38	.06	13.65
2012–13 †	Ateneo	17	17	30.41	**.467**	**.311**	**.783**	5.41	3.41	1.00	.18	16.00
2013–14	Ateneo	12	9	25.83	.363	.204	.537	4.67	2.50	1.00	.25	12.67
2014–15	Ateneo	16	16	**35.31**	.326	.276	.705	5.81	**5.50**	**1.44**	.06	**21.25**
2015–16	Ateneo	15	15	32.20	.387	.245	.514	**5.86**	4.66	1.20	**.40**	19.33

== Professional career ==
=== Semi-professional career ===
==== Mighty Sports (2016) ====
On March 1, 2016, Ravena announced that he will be suiting up for Mighty Sports for a chance to hone his skills and at the same time prepare for the 2016 PBA draft. He played alongside former PBA player, TY Tang. On February 4, 2016, he led the Mighty Sports against the Hobe Macway to reclaim the Republica Cup with 20 points (11 points in the final quarter).

On his debut game in the PCBL for the Mighty Sports, he scored 16 points on top of five assists and three steals on their win against the Jumbo Plastic Linoleum Giants. On May 18, 2016, despite having a jetlag, Ravena still managed to score 17 points (12 on the second quarter) to help his team sweep the Euro-Med Laboratory Experts on their best-of-three semi-finals series after missing Game 1 of their semi-finals match-up. On May 22, 2016, he scored 20 points (15 points in the second half) to lead his team to victory in Game 1 of the best-of-three PCBL Finals against the Jumbo Plastics Linoleum Giants. During their Game 2 match-up, against the Linoleum Giants, Ravena who was named the Most Valuable Player, led the Cavaliers with 18 points, 4 rebounds, 2 assists and 2 steals in a losing effort. He wasn't able to play in Game 3 of their match-up because he went straight to the airport right after Game 2 to catch a flight going to London to attend a celebrity volleyball match and spend time with loved ones.

==== Texas Legends (2016) ====
On November 10, 2016, Texas Legends of the NBA D-League has announced that they have signed Ravena as a "developmental player", which meant he would only be used for practice sessions and was not part of the official roster. Ravena previously tried out for the Legends but did not join the 2016 D-League draft.

=== Professional career ===
==== Alab Pilipinas (2017) ====
On March 1, 2017, Alab Pilipinas officially announced through their social media account that Ravena have already signed to play for the team although he will officially join the team right after he recuperate on the previous injury that he got during the Dubai tournament where he joined. He made his ABL debut during the first game of their best-three semifinals meeting against the Singapore Slingers wherein he scored 16 points on a losing note for Alab. Ravena's stint with Alab ended early when the Slingers defeated them during Game 2 of their best-of-three series wherein he scored 16 points on top of four rebounds and four assists for Alab.

==== NLEX Road Warriors (2017–2021) ====
On October 9, 2017, he announced via Twitter his intention to join the 2017 PBA draft and on October 29, he was drafted 2nd overall by the NLEX Road Warriors. He officially signed a three-year contract deal with the Road Warriors on November 8 that same year.

He made his PBA debut on December 19 wherein he recorded 18 points, 12 assists and 7 rebounds in a 119–115 win against the Kia Picanto. On December 25, he scored 20 points on top of 5 assists and 4 steals against the GlobalPort Batang Pier. On December 27, he got his first ever PBA Player of the week award after leading the Road Warriors to two consecutive wins.

Starting May 2018, Ravena served an 18-month ban imposed by FIBA on all basketball-related activities including playing in PBA in relation to him testing positive for a banned substance while playing for the Philippine national team. NLEX expressed support for Ravena stating that he had passed multiple drug tests by the PBA, as well as by the Samahang Basketbol ng Pilipinas and the Games and Amusements Board believing that he took the pre-workout aid which led to the ban without being aware it contained a substance prohibited by FIBA. In September 2019, he rejoined the team.

In September 2020, Ravena signed a three-year extension to his contract with NLEX.

==== Shiga Lakestars/Lakes (2021–2024) ====
The Shiga Lakestars of Japan's B. League announced on June 2, 2021, that they have signed in Ravena as their Asian import. However, Ravena's move to the Lakestars was uncertain, since he is bound by a Uniform Player Contract (UPC) he had signed with NLEX and the PBA. The contract does not allow Ravena to move to another league. The PBA blocked the move, with its board ruling on June 5 that Ravena had to honor his contract with NLEX. On July 24, he was finally allowed to join the Lakestars, once the Road Warriors' campaign in the 2021 PBA Philippine Cup has ended. On September 25, NLEX formally released Ravena which allowed him to join the Lakestars full-time. On October 2, he made his debut against the San-en NeoPhoenix and his brother Thirdy, recording 11 points, 8 assists, and 3 steals in a 93–83 win.

On August 8, 2022, Ravena re-signed with the Lakes. After the 2022–23 season, the team was relegated to the B2 League. Ravena signed a one-year contract extension with the team on May 24, 2023. He help Shiga earn back a place in the B.League by winning the 2023–24 B2 League title.

==== Yokohama B-Corsairs (2024–2026) ====
In June 2024, Ravena joined the Yokohama B-Corsairs of the B. League. His contract with Yokohama ended by May 2026 following the conclusion of the 2025–26 season.

==== Ryukyu Golden Kings (2026–) ====
Ravena signed with the Ryukyu Golden Kings in July 2026.

== National team career ==
=== Junior national team ===
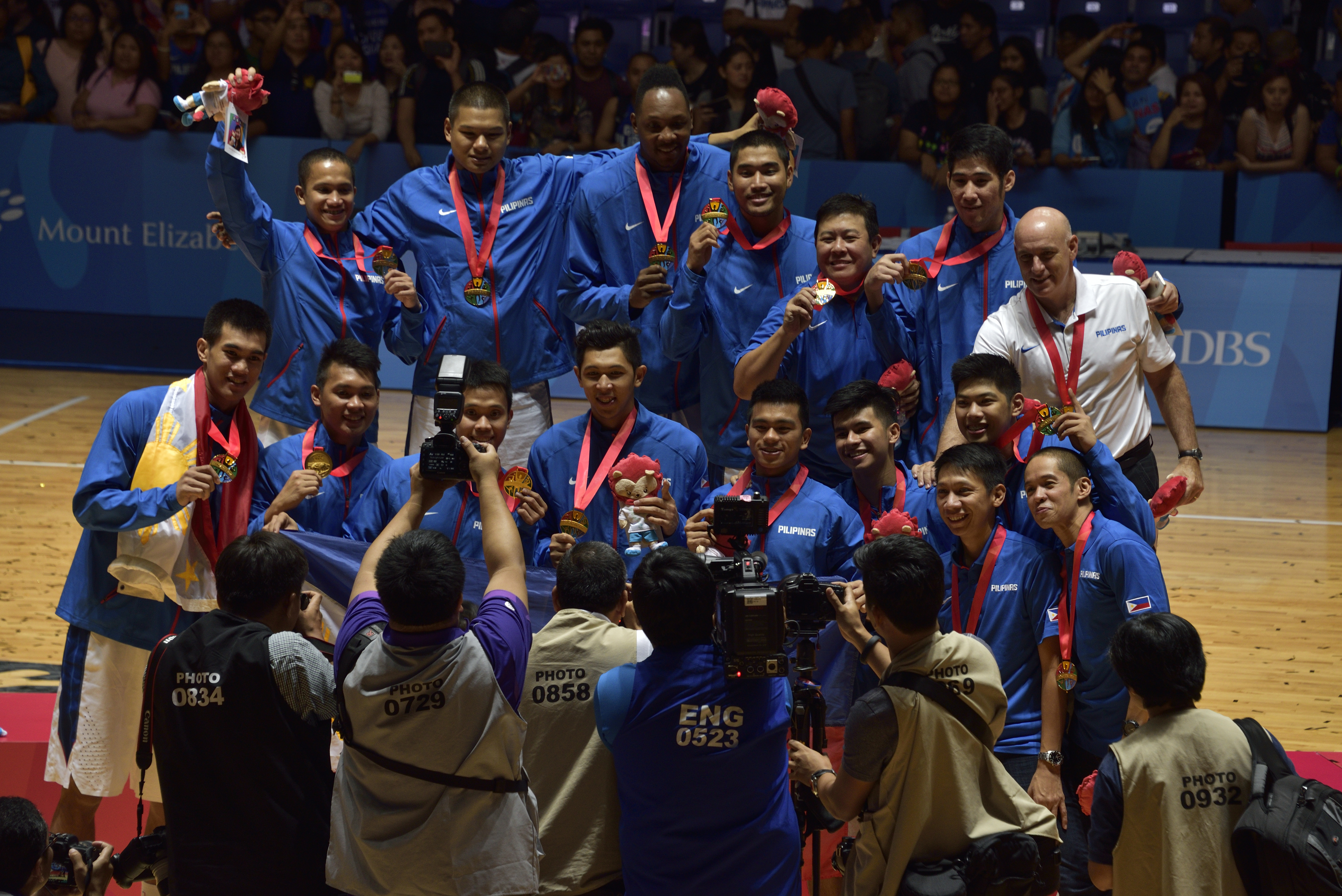
Gilas Cadets celebrating their championship at the 2015 SEA Games.

Ravena has also played for the Philippine men's national basketball team. Ravena was part of the 2009 Philippines men's national under-17 basketball squad that was sent to the 2009 FIBA Asia Under-16 Championship wherein they finished 4th place. He was also part of the 2010 Philippines men's national under-19 basketball squad that was sent to the 2010 FIBA Asia Under-18 Championship where they managed to finish in 5th place. Ravena earned the national team caps having played in the 2010 SEABA Under-18 Championship Team wherein they won the coveted gold medal against Malaysia.

=== Senior national team ===
Ravena has also played for the Philippine national team team that was sent to the 2011 SEA Games, wherein they managed to win the gold medal against Thailand.

He once again played for the Sinag Pilipinas team that was sent to the 2013 SEA Games that was held in Myanmar from December 11–22 but the basketball event started earlier from December 8–16, the team managed to swept the competition and was automatically declared champions of the tournament.

Ravena was named as the team captain of the Gilas Cadets in 2015 that will compete together with Bobby Ray Parks Jr., Kevin Ferrer and Marcus Douthit among others at the 2015 SEABA Championship in Singapore. They won the gold medal in that tournament after winning all their games. Their last game was against the host team. That same squad also competed for the Philippines at the 2015 Southeast Asian Games which was held also in Singapore last June 5–16, 2015, wherein they managed to win the gold medal against Indonesia. With these achievement, Ravena became only the second Filipino basketball player to win three straight SEA Games gold medal in basketball after Rommel Adducul did the trick in 1997, 1999 and 2001. On June 27, 2017, it was confirmed by Chot Reyes that Ravena together with Von Pessumal, Bobby Ray Parks Jr., Kevin Ferrer and Kobe Paras among others will again play for the Philippines for the 2017 William Jones Cup in Taiwan where they finished in 4th place. The same team was also sent in the 2017 Southeast Asian Games where they successfully defended their title. With these, Ravena became the first Filipino basketball player to win a record fourth straight SEA Games gold medal in basketball.

On September 19, 2017, it was announced that Ravena along with Jeron Teng, Jeric Teng, LA Revilla, Carl Bryan Cruz, Almond Vosotros, Norbert Torres and Isaiah Austin among others will be part of the national team which will compete as Chooks-to-Go Pilipinas at the 2017 FIBA Asia Champions Cup in China, wherein they finished the tournament in fifth place.

In November 2017, Ravena was named as part of the Gilas Pilipinas line-up that will compete at the 2019 FIBA World Cup qualifiers against Japan and Chinese Taipei. In February 2018, he was again included to compete against Australia and on their second meeting against Japan.

==== Suspension ====
On May 22, 2018, Ravena was suspended by FIBA for 18 months in all basketball-related activities. He was tested positive for methylhexanamine, 1,3-Dimethylbutylamine and higenamine, substances prohibited by WADA. Urine samples were taken after the Philippines vs Japan game at Manila during the 2019 FIBA Basketball World Cup qualification. Ravena explained that he consumes a pre-workout drink called C4, which can be bought from retailers around Metro Manila. He ran out of supplies shortly before a training camp in Australia and took Blackstone Labs DUST, a supplement which is mixed with water and is supposedly similar to C4. FIBA attributed the violation to Ravena's lack of anti-doping education.

==== Return and eventual retirement ====
In November 2019, Ravena returned to the national team as he represented the Philippines in the 2019 SEA Games, wherein he won his fifth straight gold medal.

Ravena was included in the 21-man pool for the 2023 FIBA World Cup, where he was eventually included in the final 12-man lineup. He has not been included in the national team or the pool ever since. Ravena later confirmed in July 2026 that he has already retired from the national team.

=== 3x3 basketball ===
==== National 3X3 team ====
Along with Jeron Teng, Bobby Ray Parks Jr., and Kevin Ferrer, Ravena competed at the 2013 FIBA Asia 3X3 Championship as part of the Philippine national 3x3 team.

Ravena represented the Philippines in the 2017 FIBA 3x3 World Cup on June 17 to 21, 2017 in Nantes, France. They finished the tournament at 11th place.

==== Other FIBA-sanctioned tournaments ====
Ravena then led the Team Philippines to a win against Team Qatar on an exhibition game at the 2015 FIBA 3x3 All-Stars which was held between the Dunk Contest and All-Stars finals of the tournament in Doha, Qatar on December 10, 2015. He was joined by Jeron Teng of La Salle, as well as Nigerian imports Ola Adeogun of San Beda and Bright Akhuetie of Perpetual. They were coached by Coach Eric Altamirano, head coach of the NU Bulldogs. Aside from representing Team Philippines, Ravena was also chosen as one of the members of the jury at the 2015 FIBA All-Stars Dunk contest.

Ravena again represented Team Philippines in an exhibition game held during the FIBA 3X3 World Tour Final this time with Karl Dehesa, Paolo Hubalde and Jayson Castro (who replaced L.A. Tenorio). The event took place in Abu Dhabi, UAE wherein they were defeated by the host team.

== PBA career statistics ==
Legend
GP	Games played	MPG	Minutes per game
FG%	Field-goal percentage	3P%	3-point field-goal percentage	FT%	Free-throw percentage
RPG	Rebounds per game	APG	Assists per game	SPG	Steals per game
BPG	Blocks per game	PPG	Points per game	**Bold**	Career high

As of the end of 2021 season

=== Season-by-season averages ===
Year	Team	GP	MPG	FG%	3P%	FT%	RPG	APG	SPG	BPG	PPG
2017–18	NLEX	**24**	28.9	.428	.378	.789	3.1	5.5	1.4	.2	16.1
2019	NLEX	13	**32.3**	.392	.347	.778	**5.5**	**7.8**	1.6	.0	16.0
2020	NLEX	11	30.5	**.473**	.396	**.825**	**5.5**	4.6	1.0	.0	**19.4**
2021	NLEX	4	29.7	.396	**.423**	.769	3.8	6.5	**1.8**	**.5**	15.8
Career		52	30.1	.426	.378	.794	4.3	5.9	1.4	.1	16.8

== Personal life ==
On February 10, 2015, it was announced that Ravena will star in his first ever sitcom entitled No Harm, No Foul that was aired on TV5. His co-stars will include PBA Superstars Willie Miller, Gary David and Beau Belga together with Eula Caballero, Sophie Albert, Valeen Montenegro, Tuesday Vargas, Yoyong Martirez, Long Mejia, Randy Santiago and Ogie Alcasid. The show premiered last July 5, 2015, and ended on October 18 on the same year with a total of 16 episodes.

Ravena also starred in his own reality show called Phenoms together with his fellow Atenean and then-girlfriend Alyssa Valdez, who is a 3-time UAAP volleyball MVP and former team captain of the Ateneo Lady Eagles. The first season aired from August 24 to November 22, 2015, on TV5 and on its official website. In December 2015, it was confirmed that the show will be back for its second season which started on June 17, 2016 and ended on September 9, 2016.

Ravena previously dated volleyball players Mika Reyes (2014-2015) and fellow Atenean Alyssa Valdez (2016-2022). In October 2024, he announced his engagement to model and beauty pageant contestant Diana Mackey. The couple married in June 2025.

== Awards and nominations ==
=== Sports ===
Year	Award	Category	Result	Reference
2016	PUSH Awards	Popular Sports Personality	Nominated	
2016	PCBL Awarding Ceremonies	Most Valuable Player	Won	
2016	PCBL Awarding Ceremonies	Mythical Team	Included	
2016	Ateneo Athletes' Night Awards	Xavier Athletic Achievement Award	Won	
2016	College Basketball Awards	Seniors Player of the Year	Nominated	
2016	College Basketball Awards	Mythical Team	Included	
2015	UAAP Season 78 Awarding Ceremony	Most Valuable Player	Won	
2015	UAAP Season 78 Awarding Ceremony	Mythical Team	Included	
2015	UAAP Season 78 Awarding Ceremony	Master Gameface Player of the Season	Won	
2015	UAAP Season 78 Awarding Ceremony	Enervon Todo Bigay Player of the Season	Won	
2014	PSA Annual Awards	Major Citation for Collegiate Basketball (tied with the San Beda Red Lions)	Won	
2014	College Basketball Awards	Seniors Player of the Year	Won	
2014	College Basketball Awards	Mythical Team	Included	
2014	Unigames Awarding Ceremony	Most Valuable Player	Won	
2014	Unigames Awarding Ceremony	Mythical Team	Included	
2014	UAAP Season 77 Awarding Ceremony	Seniors Most Valuable Player	Won	
2014	UAAP Season 77 Awarding Ceremony	Seniors Mythical Team	Included	
2014	UAAP Season 77 Awarding Ceremony	Fast Fizz Player of the Season	Won	
2014	UAAP Season 77 Awarding Ceremony	Jollibee Champ of the Season	Won	
2014	UAAP Season 77 Awarding Ceremony	Master Gameface Player of the Season	Won	
2014	UAAP Season 77 Awarding Ceremony	RCBC Savings Bank Life Changing Player of the Season	Won	
2014	UAAP Season 77 Awarding Ceremony	PS Bankable Player of the Season	Won	
2013	Filoil Flying V Cup Awarding Ceremony	Seniors Most Valuable Player	Nominated	
2013	Filoil Flying V Cup Awarding Ceremony	Seniors Mythical Team	Included	
2013	Ateneo Athletes' Night Awards	Ateneo X Factor of the Year	Won	
2013	PSA Annual Awards	PSA Sportsman of the Year (with the Ateneo Blue Eagles)	Included	
2012	Shorty Awards	Best Basketball in Social Media	Nominated	
2012	Rappler Social Media Awards	Best Pinoy Athlete	Nominated	
2012	The Samsung Sixth Man Awards	People's Choice Most Valuable Player	Won	
2012	The Samsung Sixth Man Awards	People's Choice Mythical Team	Included	
2012	College Basketball Awards	Most Valuable Player	Nominated	
2012	College Basketball Awards	Mythical Five	Included	
2012	PCCL Awarding Ceremony	Most Valuable Player	Nominated	
2012	PCCL Awarding Ceremony	Mythical Team	Included	
2012	UAAP Season 75 Awarding Ceremony	Enervon Todo Bigay Player of the Year	Won	
2012	Meg's Movers and Shakers	Meg Magazine's 30 under 30: Movers and Shakers	Included	
2012	FilOil Flying V Cup Awarding Ceremony	Seniors Most Valuable Player	Nominated	
2012	FilOil Flying V Cup Awarding Ceremony	Seniors Mythical Team	Included	
2011	PSA Annual Awards	Tony Siddayao Awardee	Included	
2011	College Basketball Awards	Most Valuable Player	Won	
2011	College Basketball Awards	Mythical Team	Included	
2011	UAAP Season 74 Awarding Ceremony	Seniors Most Valuable Player	Nominated	
2011	UAAP Season 74 Awarding Ceremony	Seniors Mythical Team	Included	
2011	UAAP Season 74 Awarding Ceremony	Seniors Rookie of the Year	Won	
2011	FilOil Flying V Cup Awarding Ceremony	Seniors Most Valuable Player	Won	
2011	FilOil Flying V Cup Awarding Ceremony	Seniors Mythical Team	Included	
2010	College Basketball Awards	Juniors Player of the Year (tied with Baser Amer)	Won	
2010	Ateneo Athletes' Night Awards	Ateneo High School Most Outstanding Athlete for Basketball	Won	
2010	FIBA Asia U-18 Championship Awarding Ceremony	Most Valuable Player	Nominated	
2010	FIBA Asia U-18 Championship Awarding Ceremony	Mythical Team	Included	
2010	FIBA Asia U-18 Championship Awarding Ceremony	Best Forward	Won	
2010	UAAP Season 73 Awarding Ceremony	Juniors Finals Most Valuable Player	Won	
2010	UAAP Season 73 Awarding Ceremony	Juniors Most Valuable Player	Nominated	
2010	UAAP Season 73 Awarding Ceremony	Juniors Mythical Team	Included	
2009	UAAP Season 72 Awarding Ceremony	Juniors Finals Most Valuable Player	Won	
2009	UAAP Season 72 Awarding Ceremony	Juniors Most Valuable Player	Nominated	
2009	UAAP Season 72 Awarding Ceremony	Juniors Mythical Team	Included	
2007	UAAP Season 70 Awarding Ceremony	Juniors Rookie of the Year	Nominated	
2005	PBA Juniors Basketball League Awarding Ceremony	Most Valuable Player	Won	
2005	PBA Juniors Basketball League Awarding Ceremony	Mythical Team	Included	

=== Non-sports ===
Year	Award	Category	Result	Reference
**2012**	Candy Awards	Candy Cutie	Nominated	
**2012**	Meg Top Choice Awards	Top Youth Icon for Male	Nominated	

Preceded by Billy Robles	PCBL Most Valuable Player; 2016	Succeeded by None; League was abolished
Preceded by Alfred Aroga	UNIGAMES Men's Basketball Most Valuable Player; 2014	Succeeded by Jonathan Grey
Preceded by Calvin Abueva	Filoil Flying V Preseason Hanes Cup Most Valuable Player; 2011	Succeeded by Bobby Ray Parks Jr.
