= Sta. Lucia Realtors (disambiguation) =

The Sta. Lucia Realtors refers to a series of Filipino sports teams owned or backed by Sta. Lucia Land, including:

- Sta. Lucia Realtors, first incarnation that played in the Philippine Basketball Association.
- Sta. Lucia Realtors (PCBL), second incarnation that played in the Pilipinas Commercial Basketball League.
- Pasig Sta. Lucia Realtors, a team that played in the Maharlika Pilipinas Basketball League, now known as the Pasig City MPBL team.
- Sta. Lucia Lady Realtors, a volleyball team that played in the Philippine Super Liga and Premier Volleyball League.
