= Mohak Hospital =

Mohak Hi‑Tech Speciality Hospital

Geography
- Location: Indore, Madhya Pradesh, India, Indore Ujjain Highway, SAIMS campus, India
- Coordinates: 22.798705°N 75.845306°E

Organisation
- Type: Multi‑specialty hospital
- Affiliated university: Sri Aurobindo Institute of Medical Sciences (SAIMS)

Links
- Lists: Hospitals in India

Mohak Hospital (also known as Mohak Hi‑Tech Speciality Hospital) is a multi‑specialty and bariatric surgery centre located within the Sri Aurobindo Institute of Medical Sciences (SAIMS) campus in Indore, Madhya Pradesh, India. The hospital is noted for its use of robotic techniques in bariatric surgery and its integration with medical education infrastructure.

== Notable achievements ==
In June 2023, Mohak Hospital performed a record-breaking series of 25 consecutive robotic bariatric surgeries within 10 hours utilizing Da Vinci robotic systems and supported by international surgical teams, led by Mohit Bhandari and Mahak Bhandari.

In January 2018, Mohak Bariatrics and Robotics, a division of Mohak Hospital, performed bariatric surgery on a Mauritian patient weighing approximately 410 kg, believed to be among the heaviest individuals to undergo the procedure in India at the time. The surgery involved specialized equipment and post-operative care to manage high-risk conditions such as hypertension, diabetes, and respiratory issues. The patient lost 30 kg in the first month following surgery, and the medical team projected a total weight loss of up to 250 kg over two to three years.

== Partnerships and personnel ==
In 2023, Manoel Galvao Neto (of Brazil) joined Mohak Bariatrics & Robotics in a role as Director of Innovation and Clinical Research, affiliated also with SAIMS. His appointment was described as part of efforts to expand bariatric endoscopy and elevate the hospital's research and training capabilities.

== Recognition ==
In 2025, Mohit Bhandari, associated with Mohak Hospital, received the International Surgeon Award from the American Society for Metabolic and Bariatric Surgery (ASMBS) Global Congress, reflecting the hospital's prominence in the field of metabolic and bariatric surgery.

== Affiliation ==
Mohak Hospital is located on the campus of SAIMS, a private medical college established in 2003 in Indore. SAIMS formally includes several clinical and educational institutions on its campus, including Mohak Hi‑Tech Speciality Hospital.

== Network and accessibility ==
The hospital is listed in the Universal Sompo cashless insurance network, indicating its integration into major healthcare financing systems.
