= 2016 PCBL Chairman's Cup =

- 2016

Tournament information
- Sport: Basketball
- Date: March 6 – May 27, 2016
- Venue(s): Malolos Sports and Convention Center & Marikina Sports Center
- Teams: 7

Final positions
- Champions: Jumbo Plastic Linoleum Giants (2nd title)
- 1st runners-up: Mighty Sports (1st finals appearance)
- 2nd runners-up: Euro-Med Laboratories
- MVP: Finals: Jeff Viernes; Conference MVP: Kiefer Ravena

The 2016 PCBL Chairman's Cup was the second and the last conference of the inaugural season of the Pilipinas Commercial Basketball League and the first and the last offering of PCBL for the year 2016. It was opened on March 6, 2016, at the Malolos Sports and Convention Center in Malolos, Bulacan. The PCBL games will be televised on a delayed basis on AksyonTV.

On May 27, 2016, the 2016 PCBL Chairman's Cup championship was awarded to Jumbo Plastic Linoleum Giants setting the first record for back to back championship wins for the Pilipinas Commercial Basketball League, after beating the heavily star-studded team Mighty Sports 80–68 on Game 3. Jeff Viernes also was named as the Finals MVP averaging 22.7 points per game.

== Developments ==
The Chairman's Cup will be the first conference of the PCBL under new commissioner Joel Banal, who replaced Ato Batolato. The PCBL also welcomed two new teams in the fledgling league, the SCTEX Road Warriors to be led by former PBA players Ervin Sotto, Ford Arao and Borgie Hermida, and Mighty Sports, bannered by former UAAP men's basketball MVP Kiefer Ravena and retired PBA player Ty Tang.

The SCTEX, under the ownership of Manila North Tollways Corporation, is also the reigning champion of the men's basketball competition in the 2016 MVP Olympics, after beating Mediaquest team, 90–80 in a one-game finals match on March 4, 2016, at the Meralco gym. PCBL will be the first major league of the Mighty Sports franchise to carry their own brand, after their appearances in small-time basketball tournaments such as Republica Cup held in Malolos, Bulacan where they won a championship.

Returning teams including Jumbo Plastic Linoleum Giants, the 2015 PCBL Founder's Cup champion., Sta. Lucia, Euro-Med, Foton and Supremo Lex-Our Lady of Fatima University. The team will also use imports for the conference. Notable imports which will be seen in the Champion's Cup are Bright Akhutie playing for Mighty Sports and Allwell Oraeme playing for Jumbo Plastic.

== Format ==
The tournament format was observed during the conference as it follows:

- The elimination round will be a double round-robin classification.
- At the end of elimination round, the top 6 teams will advance to the playoffs, while the 7th placer team is eliminated.
  - The 2 teams with the best record will go outright semifinals.
- The next 4 teams will undergo in the best-of-three quarterfinal round.
- Semifinals: (best-of-3 series)
  - SF1: #1 vs. QF1 winner
  - SF2: #2 vs. QF2 winner
- Third-place playoff:
  - SF1 vs. SF2 losers
- Finals: (best-of-3 series)
  - F1: SF1 vs SF2 winner

== Venues ==
Host cities	Arenas	Seating Capacities
Malolos	Malolos Sports and Convention Center	3,500
Marikina	Marikina Sports Center	Unknown

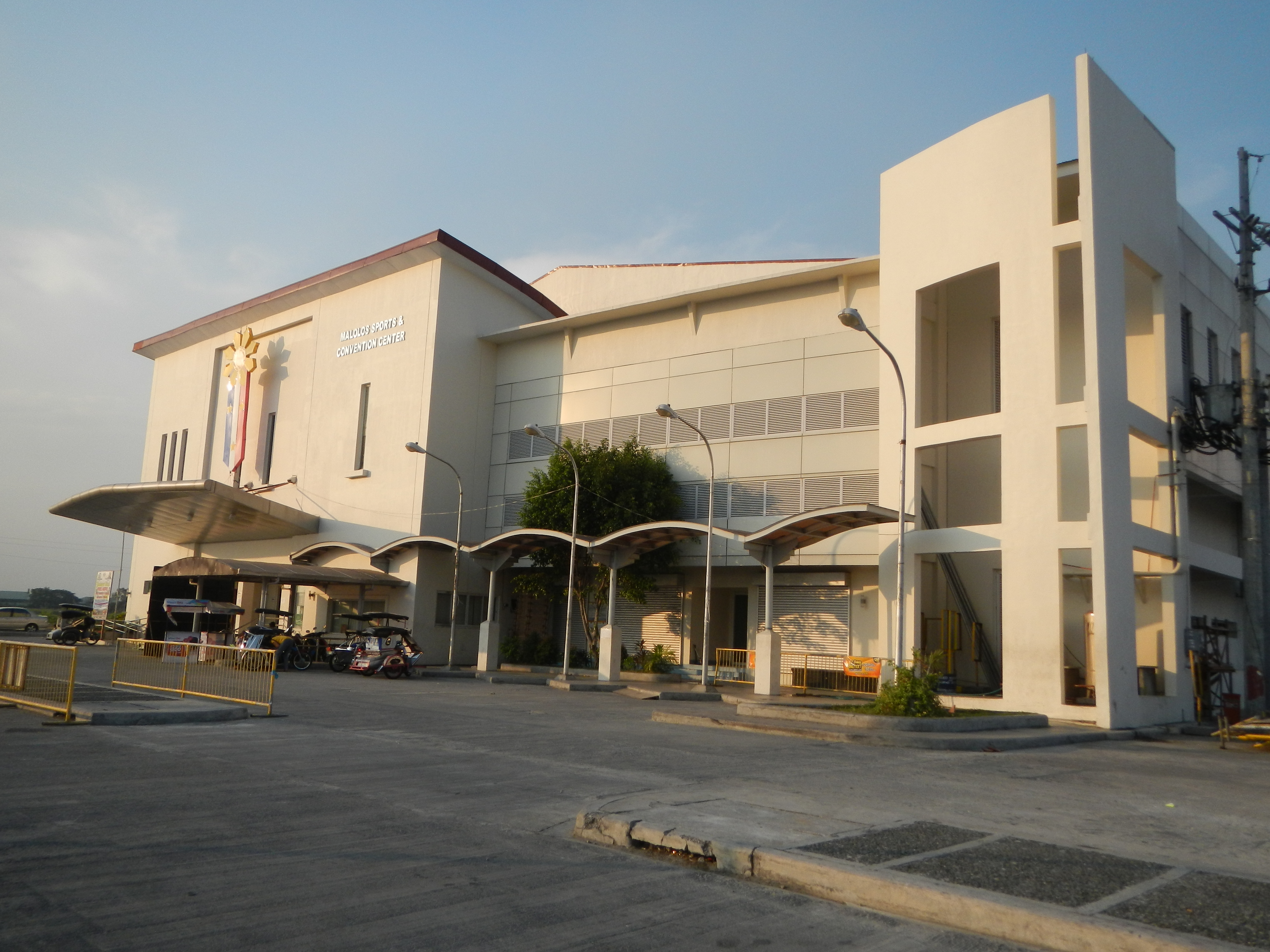
The front view of the Malolos Sports and Convention Center.

== Eliminations ==
=== Standings ===
These are the team standings at the end of elimination round:

Pos	Team	W	L	PCT	GB	Qualification
1	Mighty Sports Cavaliers	10	2	.833	—	Bye to the semi-finals
2	Jumbo Plastic Linoleum Giants	8	4	.667	2	Bye to the semi-finals
3	Biyaheng SCTEX	7	5	.583	3	Qualified for the best-of-three quarter-finals
4	Euro-Med Laboratories	6	6	.500	4	Qualified for the best-of-three quarter-finals
5	Foton Toplanders	5	7	.417	5	Qualified for the best-of-three quarter-finals
6	Sta. Lucia Realtors	5	7	.417	5	Qualified for the best-of-three quarter-finals
7	Supremo Lex Builders	1	11	.083	9	Eliminated

Rules for classification: a. head-to-head records; b. winning percentage; c. win–loss record; d. quotient system**

=== Schedule ===
	Round 1						Round 2					
Team ╲ Game	1	2	3	4	5	6	7	8	9	10	11	12
Euro-Med	SLR	JBP	MIG	SCT	SLB	FOT						
Foton Toplanders	SLB	SLR	SCT	JBP	MIG	EUR						
Jumbo Plastic Linoleum Giants	MIG	EUR	SLR	SLB	FOT	SCT						
Mighty Sports Cavaliers	JBP	SLB	EUR	SLR	FOT	SCT						SCT
Sta. Lucia Realtors	EUR	FOT	JBP	MIG	SCT	SLB						
Biyaheng SCTEX	FOT	EUR	SLR	SLB	JBP	MIG						MIG
Supremo Lex-OLFU Builders	FOT	MIG	JBP	EUR	SCT	SLR						

= Win; = Loss

=== Results ===
Team	EUR	FOT	JBP	MIG	SLR	SCT	SLB
Euro-Med		93–81	65–83	63–81	64–66	76–87	97–87
Foton	79–84*		87–82	89–104	70–62	102–99**	88–92
Jumbo Plastic	75–72	79–68		70–79	75–87	60–62	79–70
Mighty Sports	73–87	84–83*	73–74		80–67	74–70	75–68
Sta. Lucia	75–83	72–86	61–80	85–92		85–72	80–67
SCTEX	70–67	91–60	60–68	79–87	78–65		69–62
Supremo Lex	65–75	63–72	46–75	62–75	76–80	66–80	

Legend: Blue = left column team win; Red = top row team win.
Matches with lighter background shading were decided after overtime.

== Playoffs ==
=== Bracket ===
Quarterfinals (Best-of-3)
3	Biyaheng SCTEX	1
6	Sta. Lucia	2
4	Euro-Med Laboratories	2
5	Foton	1

Semifinals (Best-of-3)
2	Jumbo Plastic	2
6	Sta. Lucia	1
1	Mighty Sports	2
4	Euro-Med Laboratories	0

Finals (Best-of-3)
2	Jumbo Plastic	2
1	Mighty Sports Cavaliers	1
Third place match
4	Euro-Med Laboratories	79
6	Sta. Lucia	71

=== Quarterfinals ===
==== Euro-Med vs. Foton ====
AksyonTV

May 6
07:00 pm

Report

Euro-Med Laboratories	77–73	Foton Toplanders
Scoring by quarter: 14–16, 29–20, 20–14, 24–23
Pts: Ola Adeogun 20		Pts: Gomez 23

Marikina Sports Center, Marikina

AksyonTV

May 8
05:00 pm

Euro-Med Laboratories	76–79 (OT)	Foton Toplanders
Scoring by quarter: 26–20, 12–16, 16–13, 15–20, Overtime: 8–10
Pts: Hernandez 36		Pts: Eloy Poligrates 19

Marikina Sports Center, Marikina

AksyonTV

May 11
07:00 pm

Euro-Med Laboratories	68–52	Foton Toplanders
Scoring by quarter: 20–15, 13–13, 12–7, 23–17
Pts: Parala 15		Pts: Hernandez 13
Euro-Med wins series, 2–1

Marikina Sports Center, Marikina

==== Biyaheng SCTEX vs. Sta. Lucia ====
6 May 2016 Game 1	Sta. Lucia Realtors	72–77(OT) (Series: SCTEX leads series, 1–0)	Biyaheng SCTEX	Marikina, Metro Manila
17:00 UTC+8	Scoring by quarter: 11–20, 27–8, 17–21, 7–13, Overtime: 10–15
AksyonTV	Pts: Jammer Jamito 13		Pts: Bayron Villarias and Raul Soyud 19 each Rebs: Soyud 17	Arena: Marikina Sports Center

8 May 2016 Game 2	Sta. Lucia Realtors	77–67 (Series: Series tied, 1–1)	Biyaheng SCTEX	Marikina, Metro Manila
19:00 UTC+8	Scoring by quarter: 17–15, 20–19, 17–14, 23–19
AksyonTV	Pts: Bautista 15; Rebs: Sanjo 9		Pts: Batino 13; Rebs: Soyud 8 Asts: Batino 3	Arena: Marikina Sports Center

11 May 2016 Win or Go Home	Biyaheng SCTEX	73–80 (Series: Sta. Lucia wins series, 2–1)	Sta. Lucia Realtors	Marikina, Metro Manila
5:00 pm UTC+8	Scoring by quarter: 18–16, 19–21, 17–13, 26–23
AksyonTV	Pts: Jhaps Bautista 21		Pts: Raul Soyud 28; Rebs: Raul Soyud 16	Arena: Marikina Sports Center

== Semifinals ==
This round is in a best-of-three playoff. The first team who wins 2 games advances to the finals and the losing team will go for the third-place playoff.

=== Mighty Sports vs. Euro-Med ===
15 May 2016 Game 1	Mighty Sports Cavaliers	99–84 (Series: Mighty Sports leads series, 1–0)	Euro-Med Laboratories	Malolos City, Bulacan
19:00 UTC+8	Scoring by quarter: 34–17, 19–18, 24–19, 22–30
	Pts: Bright Akhuetie 24; Rebs: Bright Akhuetie 13		Pts: Ola Adeogun 19; Rebs: Ola Adeogun 6	Arena: Malolos Sports and Convention Center

18 May 2016 Game 2	Euro-Med Laboratories	87–98 (Series: Mighty Sports wins series, 2–0)	Mighty Sports Cavaliers	Marikina, Metro Manila
17:00 UTC+8	Scoring by quarter: 29–19, 13–32, 17–32, 28–15
AksyonTV	Pts: Salamat 15		Pts: Bright Akhuetie 33; Rebs: Bright Akhuetie 14; Asts: Banal 4	Arena: Marikina Sports Center

=== Jumbo Plastic vs. Sta. Lucia series ===
AksyonTV

May 15
17:00

Jumbo Plastic Linoleum Giants 94, Sta. Lucia Realtors 89 (OT)
Scoring by quarter: 26-14, 21-22, 14-30, 20-15, Overtime: 13-8
Pts: Arafat 16; Rebs: Taganas 9	Pts: Vidal 14

Malolos Sports and Convention Center, Malolos, Bulacan

AksyonTV

May 18
19:00

Sta. Lucia Realtors 68, Jumbo Plastic Linoleum Giants 62
Scoring by quarter: 17-15, 27-19, 15-10, 9-18
Pts: Vidal 15; Rebs: Sanjo 12	Pts: Martinez 15

Marikina Sports Center, Marikina

AksyonTV

May 20
18:00

Jumbo Plastic Linoleum Giants 70, Sta. Lucia Realtors 56
Scoring by quarter: 20-12, 24-16, 12-15, 14-13
Pts: Taganas 13	Pts: Sanjo 17
Jumbo Plastic wins series, 2–1

Marikina Sports Center, Marikina

== Third place match ==
AksyonTV

May 25
17:00

Euro-Med Laboratories	79–71	Sta. Lucia Realtors
Scoring by quarter: 24-20, 15-15, 20-23, 20-13
Pts: Bangga 16		Pts: Custodio 19
Euro-Med wins third place trophy.

Marikina Sports Center, Marikina

== Finals ==
AksyonTV

May 22
18:00

Mighty Sports Cavaliers	79–67	Jumbo Plastic Linoleum Giants
Scoring by quarter: 20–12, 14–13, 22–23, 23–19
Pts: Ravena 20; Rebs: Akhuetie 19		Pts: Viernes 16

Malolos Sports and Convention Center,
Malolos, Bulacan

AksyonTV

May 25
19:00

Jumbo Plastic Linoleum Giants	89–87 (OT)	Mighty Sports Cavaliers
Scoring by quarter: 16–19, 29–20, 19–18, 16–23, Overtime: 9–7
Pts: Viernes, Martinez 31 each Rebs: Viernes 4 Asts: Viernes 6		Pts: Akhuetie 27; Rebs: Akhuetie 22; Asts: Ravena 2

Marikina Sports Center, Marikina

AksyonTV

May 27
18:00

Jumbo Plastic Linoleum Giants	80–68	Mighty Sports Cavaliers
Scoring by quarter: 15–16, 13–19, 25–17, 27–16
Pts: Viernes 21; Rebs: Viernes 6 Asts: Viernes 8		Pts: Akhuetie 14; Rebs: Akhuetie 15
Jumbo Plastic wins series, 2–1

Marikina Sports Center, Marikina

This is the only finals meeting between the Mighty Sports and the Giants.

Elimination round meetings
Tied 1–1 in both meetings

AksyonTV

March 6
05:00 pm (UTC+8)

Report

Mighty Sports Cavaliers	79–70	Jumbo Plastic Linoleum Giants

Malolos Sports and Convention Center,
Malolos, Bulacan

AksyonTV

April 15
07:00 pm (UTC+8)

Report

Mighty Sports Cavaliers	73–74	Jumbo Plastic Linoleum Giants

Marikina Sports Center, Marikina

== Awards ==
Individual Category
Award	Winner	Team
Conference MVP	(Philippines) Kiefer Ravena	Mighty Sports
Defensive Player of the Conference Award	(Philippines) Jeff Viernes	Jumbo Plastic Linoleum Giants
Best Import of the Conference Award	(Cameroon) Bright Akhuetie	Mighty Sports

Team Category
Awards	Members	Team
The Mythical Five	(Philippines) Kiefer Ravena	Mighty Sports
The Mythical Five	(Cameroon) Bright Akhuetie	Mighty Sports
The Mythical Five	(Philippines) Jeff Viernes	Jumbo Plastic Linoleum Giants
The Mythical Five	(Philippines) Raul Soyud	Biyaheng SCTEX
The Mythical Five	(Philippines) Cedrick Ablaza	Foton Toplanders
The All-Defensive Team	(Philippines) Kent Salado	Sta. Lucia Realtors
The All-Defensive Team	(Philippines) Marlon Gomez	Foton Toplanders
The All-Defensive Team	(Philippines) Rocky Acidre	Supremo Lex Builders
The All-Defensive Team	(Philippines) Stephen Siruma	Jumbo Plastic Linoleum Giants
The All-Defensive Team	(Philippines) Jay-R Taganas	Jumbo Plastic Linoleum Giants
