= 2017 FIBA Asia Champions Cup =

26th Asia Champions Cup

Tournament details
- Host country: China
- Dates: 22–30 September
- Teams: 10 (from 45 federations)
- Venue: 1 (in 1 host city)

Final positions
- Champions: Lebanon (Al-Riyadi 's 2nd title; Lebanon's 5th title)

Tournament statistics
- Games played: 32
- MVP: (United States) (Bulgaria) Darius Adams
- Top scorer: (United Arab Emirates) Alshabebi (25.9)
- Top rebounds: (United States) Austin (13.0)
- Top assists: (Philippines) (United States) Brickman (7.0)
- PPG (Team): (Lebanon) Al-Riyadi (101.0)
- RPG (Team): (Iran) Petrochimi (46.6)
- APG (Team): (Lebanon) Al-Riyadi (21.9)

Official website
- 2017 FIBA Asia Champions Cup

The 2017 FIBA Asia Champions Cup was the 26th staging of the FIBA Asia Champions Cup, the international basketball club tournament of FIBA Asia. The tournament took place in Chenzhou, China from 22 September to 30 September 2017. This was the second straight year that China hosted the tournament.

== Qualification ==
According to the FIBA Asia rules, the number of participating teams in the FIBA Asia Champions Cup is ten. Each of the six FIBA Asia Sub-Zones has one place, and the hosts (China) was automatically qualified. The other three places are allocated to the zones according to performance in the 2016 FIBA Asia Champions Cup.

| Central Asia (1) | East Asia (1+2) | Gulf (1) | South Asia (1) | Southeast Asia (1) | West Asia (1+1+1) |
|---|---|---|---|---|---|
| (Kazakhstan) BC Astana | (China) Xinjiang Flying Tigers | (United Arab Emirates) Al-Ahli | (India) ONGC | (Thailand) Mono Vampire | (Lebanon) Al-Riyadi |
| | ~~(Japan) Sun Rockers Shibuya~~* | | | (Philippines) Chooks-to-Go Pilipinas | (Iran) Petrochimi |
| | (Chinese Taipei) Dacin Tigers | | | | (Palestine) Sareyyet Ramallah |

=== West Asia ===
On March 17, 2017, Al-Riyadi of Lebanon ruled the West Asia Basketball Association (WABA) Champions Cup for the fourth time in their history after beating defending champions Petrochimi of Iran, 83-69, in the Final in Amman, Jordan. Joining the finalists is the first-time participants Sareyyet Ramallah of Palestine, which qualified by virtue of their win over Iraq's Al Mina the day before.

=== Southeast Asia ===
On April 23, 2017, Mono Vampire of Thailand qualified to the main tournament by being the champion of TBSL (Thailand Basketball Super League).

Singapore Slingers, who was the runner-up in the ASEAN Basketball League in 2017, was supposed to play in the tournament, but apparently withdrew due to the 2017 Southeast Asian Games.

Chooks-to-Go Pilipinas were given a wildcard slot on September 5, as a replacement to Japan's SunRockers Shibuya. SunRockers Shibuya withdrew their participation due to scheduling conflicts with the B.League.

=== Gulf ===
The 37th GCC Club Basketball Championship was held from May 12 up to May 20, 2017 in Manama, Bahrain. United Arab Emirates' Al-Ahli defeated their compatriots Al Shabab in the final. Joining the champions is the Manama Club of Bahrain, who took the bronze medal by defeating Al-Rayyan of Qatar. Eight teams vied for the two slots allotted for the Gulf Region. The draw for the tournament was held on April 7, 2017.

=== South Asia ===
The 2017 SABA Championship, which is also the qualifying tournament for the 2017 FIBA Asia Cup and 2019 FIBA Basketball World Cup Asian Qualifiers, was also designated as the qualifying tournament for SABA subzone for the 2017 FIBA Asia Champions Cup. Since India won the tournament, their top domestic club will also represent South Asia, which means that the defending Indian champs ONGC will represent India and South Asia.

== Draw ==
The draw was held in Beijing on 25 August 2017. Three pots used for the draw. All ten teams except China's representative where distributed among the pots according to their geographical locations. The Chinese representative chose the group which they would like to be in. The identity of the Japanese team which later withdrew were not yet announced at the time of the draw.

| Pot 1 | Pot 2 | Pot 3 |
|---|---|---|
| (Kazakhstan) BC Astana (India) ONGC (Thailand) Mono Vampire (United Arab Emirates) Al-Ahli | (Lebanon) Al-Riyadi (Iran) Petrochimi (Palestine) Sareyyet Ramallah | (Chinese Taipei) Dacin Tigers; ~~(Japan) TBA~~* |
(China) Xinjiang Flying Tigers were not allocated in a pot and joined the group of their choosing.

- (*) Identity unknown at the time of draw, later announced as Sun Rockers Shibuya. The team withdrew from the tournament and was replaced by Chooks-to-Go Pilipinas of the Philippines.

== Preliminary round ==
All times are local (UTC+8).

=== Group A ===
| Pos | Team | Pld | W | L | PF | PA | PD | Pts | Qualification |
|---|---|---|---|---|---|---|---|---|---|
| 1 | (Kazakhstan) Astana | 4 | 3 | 1 | 285 | 255 | +30 | 7 | Advance to quarterfinals |
| 2 | (Iran) Petrochimi | 4 | 3 | 1 | 371 | 237 | +134 | 7 | Advance to quarterfinals |
| 3 | (Philippines) Chooks-to-Go Pilipinas | 4 | 2 | 2 | 336 | 343 | −7 | 6 | Advance to quarterfinals |
| 4 | (Thailand) Mono Vampire | 4 | 1 | 3 | 330 | 411 | −81 | 5 | Advance to quarterfinals |
| 5 | (Palestine) Sareyyet Ramallah | 4 | 1 | 3 | 285 | 361 | −76 | 5 | |

Source: FIBA Asia

22 September 2017
16:25

Boxscore

| Sareyyet Ramallah (Palestine) | 100–102 (OT) | (Thailand) Mono Vampire |
Scoring by quarter: 21–27, 20–19, 34–23, 15–21, Overtime: 10–12
| Pts: Abu-Shamala, O'Brien 24; Rebs: O'Brien 12; Asts: Weeden 8 | | Pts: Singletary 38; Rebs: Singletary 12; Asts: Brickman 11 |

Chenzhou Olympic Sports Centre Gymnasium, Chenzhou
Referees: Yuji Hirahara (JPN), Nan Ye (CHN), Jung Yu (TPE)

22 September 2017
21:45

Boxscore

| BC Astana (Kazakhstan) | 65–73 | (Philippines) Chooks-to-Go Pilipinas |
Scoring by quarter: 19–21, 24–14, 12–22 , 10–16
| Pts: Gavrilov 11; Rebs: Gavrilov 11; Asts: Carter 4 | | Pts: Ravena 22; Rebs: Austin 18; Asts: Revilla 4 |

Chenzhou Olympic Sports Centre Gymnasium, Chenzhou
Referees: Noujaim Rabah (LBN), Chan Owe Shiong (MAS), Xiao Zhang (CHN)

23 September 2017
14:30

Boxscore

| Petrochimi (Iran) | 65–66 | (Kazakhstan) BC Astana |
Scoring by quarter: 21–12, 18–18, 14–21, 12–15
| Pts: Warren 17; Rebs: Kazemi 10; Asts: Begić, Warren 3 | | Pts: Carter 24; Rebs: Zhigulin 10; Asts: Murzagaliyev 3 |

Chenzhou Olympic Sports Centre Gymnasium, Chenzhou
Referees: Rabah Noujaim (LBN), Sharad Vasant Bansode (IND), Jun Yan (CHN)

23 September 2017
16:45

Boxscore

| Chooks-to-Go Pilipinas (Philippines) | 82–89 | (Palestine) Sareyyet Ramallah |
Scoring by quarter: 13–21, 20–20, 21–23, 28–25
| Pts: Ravena 24; Rebs: Austin 8 Asts: Ravena 3 | | Pts: Weeden 22; Rebs: Abu-Shamala 12; Asts: O'Brien 5 |

Chenzhou Olympic Sports Centre Gymnasium, Chenzhou
Referees: Harja Jaladri (INA), Chan Owe Shiong (MAS), Chuang Chih Chun (TPE)

24 September 2017
14:30

Boxscore

| Mono Vampire (Thailand) | 102–115 | (Philippines) Chooks-to-Go Pilipinas |
Scoring by quarter: 22–31, 29–26, 26–24, 25–34
| Pts: Singletary 32; Rebs: Singletary 10; Asts: Brickman 9 | | Pts: Cruz 28; Rebs: Austin 19; Asts: Revilla 9 |

Chenzhou Olympic Sports Centre Gymnasium, Chenzhou
Referees: Rabah Noujaim (LBN), Chuang Chih-Chun (TPE), Ye Nan (CHN)

24 September 2017
21:45

Boxscore

| Sareyyet Ramallah (Palestine) | 45–108 | (Iran) Petrochimi |
Scoring by quarter: 16–21, 7–27, 6–29, 16–31
| Pts: O'Brien 15; Rebs: O'Brien 11; Asts: O'Brien 4 | | Pts: Warren 25; Rebs: Kazemi 11; Asts: Mashayekhi 4 |

Chenzhou Olympic Sports Centre Gymnasium, Chenzhou
Referees: Yuji Hirahara (JPN), Yu Jung (TPE), Zhang Xiao (CHN)

25 September 2017
14:30

Boxscore

| BC Astana (Kazakhstan) | 69–51 | (Palestine) Sareyyet Ramallah |
Scoring by quarter: 14–10, 23–9, 21–17, 11–15
| Pts: Carter 23; Rebs: Kolesnikov 8 Asts: Clemmons 5 | | Pts: O'Brien 18; Rebs: O'Brien 9 Asts: Abu-Shamala 3 |

Chenzhou Olympic Sports Centre Gymnasium, Chenzhou
Referees: Yan Jun (CHN), Rabah Noujaim (LBN), Yu Jung (TPE)

25 September 2017
19:30

Boxscore

| Petrochimi (Iran) | 111–60 | (Thailand) Mono Vampire |
Scoring by quarter: 26–19, 21–18, 30–14, 34–9
| Pts: Warren 20; Rebs: Mirzaei 15; Asts: Warren 7 | | Pts: Singletary 12; Rebs: Singletary 5 Asts: Brickman 5 |

Chenzhou Olympic Sports Centre Gymnasium, Chenzhou
Referees: Ye Nan (CHN), Yuji Hirahara (JPN), Harja Jaladri (INA)

26 September 2017
16:45

Boxscore

| Mono Vampire (Thailand) | 66–85 | (Kazakhstan) BC Astana |
Scoring by quarter: 17–18, 8–13, 25–27, 16–27
| Pts: Singletary 30; Rebs: Singletary 8 Asts: Brickman 3 | | Pts: Carter 27; Rebs: Kolesnikov 15; Asts: Carter 5 |

Chenzhou Olympic Sports Centre Gymnasium, Chenzhou
Referees: Chuang Chih-Chun (TPE), Sharad Vasant Bansode (IND), Harja Jaladri (INA)

26 September 2017
21:45

Boxscore

| Chooks-to-Go Pilipinas (Philippines) | 66–87 | (Iran) Petrochimi |
Scoring by quarter: 14–16, 15–27, 16–18, 21–26
| Pts: Austin, Ravena 20; Rebs: Austin 12; Asts: Ravena 5 | | Pts: Warren 30; Rebs: Kazemi 18; Asts: Mashayekhi 5 |

Chenzhou Olympic Sports Centre Gymnasium, Chenzhou
Referees: Yu Jung (TPE), Rabah Noujaim (LBN), Zhang Xiao (CHN)

=== Group B ===
| Pos | Team | Pld | W | L | PF | PA | PD | Pts | Qualification |
|---|---|---|---|---|---|---|---|---|---|
| 1 | (Lebanon) Al-Riyadi | 4 | 4 | 0 | 435 | 250 | +185 | 8 | Advance to quarterfinals |
| 2 | China Kashgar | 4 | 3 | 1 | 361 | 287 | +74 | 7 | Advance to quarterfinals |
| 3 | (Chinese Taipei) Taipei Dacin Tigers | 4 | 2 | 2 | 352 | 326 | +26 | 6 | Advance to quarterfinals |
| 4 | (United Arab Emirates) Shabab Al-Ahli Dubai | 4 | 1 | 3 | 245 | 376 | −131 | 5 | Advance to quarterfinals |
| 5 | (India) ONGC | 4 | 0 | 4 | 231 | 385 | −154 | 4 | |

Source: FIBA Asia

22 September 2017
14:30

Boxscore

| Dacin Tigers (Chinese Taipei) | 94–62 | (India) ONGC |
Scoring by quarter: 28–9, 22–13, 22–13, 22–27
| Pts: Chih-Feng 22; Rebs: Bhullar 11; Asts: I-Chieh, Yu-Chun, Huang Jhen 3 | | Pts: Bhandari 15; Rebs: Mukkanniyil 9 Asts: Uddin 4 |

Chenzhou Olympic Sports Centre Gymnasium, Chenzhou
Referees: Ferdinand Pascual (PHI), Anan Daraghma (PLE), Nattapong Jontapa (THA)

22 September 2017
19:30

Boxscore

| Shabab Al-Ahli Dubai (United Arab Emirates) | 43–96 | China Kashgar |
Scoring by quarter: 11–22, 12–24, 10–25, 10–25
| Pts: Alshabebi, Salem 16; Rebs: Alblooshi 7 Asts: Alblooshi 2 | | Pts: Adams 17; Rebs: Abudurexiti 8 Asts: Adams 7 |

Chenzhou Olympic Sports Centre Gymnasium, Chenzhou
Referees: Harja Jaladri (INA), Sadegh Ghanbaridamanab (IRI), Alexey Stepanenko (KAZ)

23 September 2017
19:30

Boxscore

| China Kashgar | 100–94 | (Chinese Taipei) Dacin Tigers |
Scoring by quarter: 20–24, 28–23, 23–21, 29–26
| Pts: Adams 31; Rebs: Adams, Makan 8 Asts: Adams 7 | | Pts: Bhullar 26; Rebs: Bhullar 14; Asts: I-Chieh 5 |

Chenzhou Olympic Sports Centre Gymnasium, Chenzhou
Referees: Yuji Hirahara (JPN), Joenard Garcia (PHI), Hadi Salem (IRI)

23 September 2017
21:45

Boxscore

| Al-Riyadi (Lebanon) | 116–55 | (United Arab Emirates) Shabab Al-Ahli Dubai |
Scoring by quarter: 31–6, 31–14, 30–20, 25–15
| Pts: Douby 20; Rebs: Daniels, Haidar 12; Asts: Mahmoud 9 | | Pts: Alshabebi 26; Rebs: Alshabebi 11; Asts: Alblooshi, Salem 3 |

Chenzhou Olympic Sports Centre Gymnasium, Chenzhou
Referees: Ferdinand Pascual (PHI), Nattapong Jontapa (THA), Alexey Stepanenko (KAZ)

24 September 2017
16:45

Boxscore

| Dacin Tigers (Chinese Taipei) | 71–89 | (Lebanon) Al-Riyadi |
Scoring by quarter: 16–29, 17–17, 22–29, 16–14
| Pts: Bhullar 17; Rebs: Bhullar 8 Asts: Yu-Chun 3 | | Pts: Douby 20; Rebs: Nour 11; Asts: Arakji 8 |

Chenzhou Olympic Sports Centre Gymnasium, Chenzhou
Referees: Harja Jaladri (INA), Chan Owe-Shiong (MAS), Alexey Stepanenko (KAZ)

24 September 2017
19:30

Boxscore

| ONGC (India) | 47–92 | China Kashgar |
Scoring by quarter: 9–20, 19–30, 9–24, 10–18
| Pts: Singh 17; Rebs: Yadwinder 14; Asts: Uddin, Yadwinder 3 | | Pts: Adams 25; Rebs: Sun 9 Asts: Wang, Xirelijiang 5 |

Chenzhou Olympic Sports Centre Gymnasium, Chenzhou
Referees: Ferdinand Pascual (PHI), Anan Daraghma (PLE), Sadegh Ghanbaridamanab (IRI)

25 September 2017
16:45

Boxscore

| Shabab Al-Ahli Dubai (United Arab Emirates) | 75–93 | (Chinese Taipei) Dacin Tigers |
Scoring by quarter: 14–13, 23–27, 24–23, 14–30
| Pts: Alshabebi 37; Rebs: Alshabebi 22; Asts: Alblooshi, Juma 6 | | Pts: Cheng 22; Rebs: Bhullar 6 Asts: Cheng, Weng 6 |

Chenzhou Olympic Sports Centre Gymnasium, Chenzhou
Referees: Alexey Stepanenko (KAZ), Ferdinand Pascual (PHI), Hadi Salem (IRI)

25 September 2017
21:45

Boxscore

| Al-Riyadi (Lebanon) | 127–51 | (India) ONGC |
Scoring by quarter: 38–18, 34–6, 34–14, 21–13
| Pts: Douby 22; Rebs: Tabet 14; Asts: Mahmoud 8 | | Pts: Mukkanniyil 13; Rebs: Mukkanniyil 10; Asts: Bhandari, Uddin 2 |

Chenzhou Olympic Sports Centre Gymnasium, Chenzhou
Referees: Joenard Garcia (PHI), Chan Owe Shiong (MAS), Nattapong Jontapa (THA)

26 September 2017
14:30

Boxscore

| ONGC (India) | 71–72 | (United Arab Emirates) Shabab Al-Ahli Dubai |
Scoring by quarter: 18–19, 18–20, 10–15, 25–18
| Pts: Uddin 20; Rebs: Mukkanniyil 11; Asts: Uddin, Singh 3 | | Pts: Alshabebi 25; Rebs: Alshabebi 12; Asts: Alblooshi 8 |

Chenzhou Olympic Sports Centre Gymnasium, Chenzhou
Referees: Chan Owe Shiong (MAS), Anan Daraghma (PLE), Sadegh Ghanbaridamanab (IRI)

26 September 2017
19:30

Boxscore

| China Kashgar | 73–103 | (Lebanon) Al-Riyadi |
Scoring by quarter: 17–28, 28–19, 13–34, 15–22
| Pts: Adams 22; Rebs: Adams 6 Asts: Blatche 6 | | Pts: Haidar 23; Rebs: Tabet 14; Asts: Douby 5 |

Chenzhou Olympic Sports Centre Gymnasium, Chenzhou
Referees: Alexey Stepanenko (KAZ), Yuji Hirahara (JPN), Ferdinand Pascual (PHI)

== Final round ==
5th place game
A3 | (Philippines) Chooks-to-Go Pilipinas | 89
A4 | (Thailand) Mono Vampire | 79
7th place game
B4 | (United Arab Emirates) Shabab Al-Ahli Dubai | 58
B3 | (Chinese Taipei) Taipei Dacin Tigers | 103

5th–8th place semifinals
B4 | (United Arab Emirates) Shabab Al-Ahli Dubai | 57
A3 | (Philippines) Chooks-to-Go Pilipinas | 92
A4 | (Thailand) Mono Vampire | 92
B3 | (Chinese Taipei) Taipei Dacin Tigers | 89

Quarterfinals
B4 | (United Arab Emirates) Shabab Al-Ahli Dubai | 53
A1 | (Kazakhstan) BC Astana | 83
B2 | China Kashgar | 86
A3 | (Philippines) Chooks-to-Go Pilipinas | 70
A4 | (Thailand) Mono Vampire | 73
B1 | (Lebanon) Al-Riyadi | 110
A2 | (Iran) Petrochimi | 97
B3 | (Chinese Taipei) Taipei Dacin Tigers | 80

Semifinals
A1 | (Kazakhstan) BC Astana | 70
B2 | China Kashgar | 79
B1 | (Lebanon) Al-Riyadi | 74
A2 | (Iran) Petrochimi | 64

Final
B2 | China Kashgar | 59
B1 | (Lebanon) Al-Riyadi | 88
Bronze medal game
A1 | (Kazakhstan) BC Astana | 81
A2 | (Iran) Petrochimi | 78

=== Quarterfinals ===
28 September 2017
14:30

Box Score

| Petrochimi (Iran) | 97–80 | (Chinese Taipei) Taipei Dacin Tigers |
Scoring by quarter: 26–18, 22–23, 20–16, 29–23
| Pts: Warren 31; Rebs: Kazemii 15; Asts: Kazemi 5 | | Pts: Tzu-Kang 13; Rebs: Bhullar 9 Asts: I-Chieh 4 |

Chenzhou Olympic Sports Centre Gymnasium, Chenzhou
Referees: Alexey Stepanenko (KAZ), Joenard Garcia (PHI), Yan Jun (CHN)

28 September 2017
16:45

Box Score

| BC Astana (Kazakhstan) | 83–53 | (United Arab Emirates) Shabab Al-Ahli Dubai |
Scoring by quarter: 22–7, 25–14, 23–18, 13–14
| Pts: Carter 17; Rebs: Degtyarev 8 Asts: Carter, Clemmons 4 | | Pts: Salem 17; Rebs: Alshabebi 11; Asts: Alblooshi 3 |

Chenzhou Olympic Sports Centre Gymnasium, Chenzhou
Referees: Chuang Chih-Chun (TPE), Nattapong Jontapa (THA), Hadi Salem (IRI)

28 September 2017
19:30

Box Score

| China Kashgar | 86–70 | (Philippines) Chooks-to-Go Pilipinas |
Scoring by quarter: 24–17, 21–22, 23–18, 18–13
| Pts: Adams 23; Rebs: Adams 9 Asts: Sun 6 | | Pts: Austin, Ravena 16; Rebs: Austin 11; Asts: Manuel 3 |

Chenzhou Olympic Sports Centre Gymnasium, Chenzhou
Referees: Rabah Noujaim (LBN), Yuji Hirahara (JPN), Harja Jaladri (INA)

28 September 2017
21:45

Box Score

| Al-Riyadi (Lebanon) | 110–73 | (Thailand) Mono Vampire |
Scoring by quarter: 33–23, 22–15, 28–22, 27–13
| Pts: Saoud 30; Rebs: Haidar 10; Asts: Saoud 9 | | Pts: Chanthachon 19; Rebs: Singletary 8 Asts: Brickman 4 |

Chenzhou Olympic Sports Centre Gymnasium, Chenzhou
Referees: Ferdinand Pascual (PHI), Chan Owe Shiong (MAS), Ye Nan (CHN)

=== Classification 5th–8th ===
29 September 2017
14:30

Box Score

| Taipei Dacin Tigers (Chinese Taipei) | 89–92 | (Thailand) Mono Vampire |
Scoring by quarter: 26–27, 28–22, 19–18, 16–25
| Pts: Tzu-Kang 22; Rebs: Bhullar 14; Asts: Tzu-Kang, Chia-Jung 3 | | Pts: Brickman 27; Rebs: Singletary 13; Asts: Brickman 11 |

Chenzhou Olympic Sports Centre Gymnasium, Chenzhou
Referees: Rabah Noujaim (LBN), Anan Daraghma (PLE), Xiao Zhang (CHN)

29 September 2017
16:45

Box Score

| Chooks-to-Go Pilipinas (Philippines) | 92–57 | (United Arab Emirates) Shabab Al-Ahli Dubai |
Scoring by quarter: 19–13, 23–13, 22–19, 28–12
| Pts: Ravena 20; Rebs: Cruz 10; Asts: Austin 5 | | Pts: Alshabebi 28; Rebs: Alshabebi 13; Asts: Balabed 4 |

Chenzhou Olympic Sports Centre Gymnasium, Chenzhou
Referees: Alexey Stepanenko (KAZ), Sharad Vasant Bansode (IND), Sadegh ghanbaridamanab (IRI)

=== Semifinals ===
29 September 2017
19:30

Box Score

| China Kashgar | 79–70 | (Kazakhstan) BC Astana |
Scoring by quarter: 18–19, 16–17, 20–23, 25–11
| Pts: Adams 27; Rebs: Adams 9 Asts: Adams 4 | | Pts: Carter 26; Rebs: Carter, Marchuk 7 Asts: Four players 1 |

Chenzhou Olympic Sports Centre Gymnasium, Chenzhou
Referees: Yuji Hirahara (JPN), Owe Shiong chan (MAS), Chih-Chun Chuang (TPE)

29 September 2017
21:45

Box Score

| Petrochimi (Iran) | 64–74 | (Lebanon) Al-Riyadi |
Scoring by quarter: 10–12, 15–25, 21–16, 18–21
| Pts: Kazemi 14; Rebs: Kazemi 14; Asts: Mashayekhi 3 | | Pts: Douby 23; Rebs: Haidar 10; Asts: Douby 5 |

Chenzhou Olympic Sports Centre Gymnasium, Chenzhou
Referees: Ferdinand Pascual (PHI), Harja JALAdri (INA), Jung Yu (TPE)

=== Seventh place game ===
30 September 2017
10:00

Box Score

| Taipei Dacin Tigers (Chinese Taipei) | 103–58 | (United Arab Emirates) Shabab Al-Ahli Dubai |
Scoring by quarter: 18–22, 25–11, 28–16, 32–9
| Pts: Yu Chun 20; Rebs: Chia-Hung, Li-Huang 10; Asts: Huang Jhen 6 | | Pts: Alshabebi 28; Rebs: Alshabebi 13; Asts: Balabed, Juma 2 |

Chenzhou Olympic Sports Centre Gymnasium, Chenzhou
Referees: Hadi Salem (IRI), Sharad Vasant Bansode (IND), Nattapong Jontapa (THA)

=== Fifth place game ===
30 September 2017
12:15

Box Score

| Mono Vampire (Thailand) | 79–89 | (Philippines) Chooks-to-Go Pilipinas |
Scoring by quarter: 28–22, 17–20, 12–24, 22–23
| Pts: Singletary 30; Rebs: Chanthachon 10; Asts: Brickman 6 | | Pts: Austin 37; Rebs: Austin 15; Asts: Austin 6 |

Chenzhou Olympic Sports Centre Gymnasium, Chenzhou
Referees: Alexey Stepanenko (KAZ), Sadegh Ghanbaridamanab (IRI), Jung Yu (TPE)

=== Third place game ===
30 September 2017
15:00

Boxscore

| Petrochimi (Iran) | 78–81 | (Kazakhstan) BC Astana |
Scoring by quarter: 17–19, 20–19, 24–24, 17–19
| Pts: Kazemi 23; Rebs: Kazemi 11; Asts: Four players 2 | | Pts: Clemmons 22; Rebs: Kolesnikov 8 Asts: Clemmons 5 |

Chenzhou Olympic Sports Centre Gymnasium, Chenzhou
Referees: Rabah Noujaim (LBN), Chan Owe Shiong (MAS), Chuang Chih-Chun (TPE)

=== Final ===
30 September 2017
17:15

Boxscore

| Al-Riyadi (Lebanon) | 88–59 | China Kashgar |
Scoring by quarter: 21–13, 25–13, 21–11, 21–22
| Pts: Daniels 21; Rebs: Daniels 10; Asts: Arakji 10 | | Pts: Li 14; Rebs: Sun 6 Asts: Adams 3 |

Chenzhou Olympic Sports Centre Gymnasium, Chenzhou
Referees: Ferdinand Pascual (PHI), Yuji Hiranara (JPN), Harja Jaladri (INA)

== Final ranking ==
| Rank | Team | Record |
|---|---|---|
| 1st place, gold medalist(s) | (Lebanon) Al Riyadi | 7–0 |
| 2nd place, silver medalist(s) | China Kashgar | 5–2 |
| 3rd place, bronze medalist(s) | (Kazakhstan) BC Astana | 5–2 |
| 4th | (Iran) Petrochimi | 4–3 |
| 5th | (Philippines) Chooks-to-Go Pilipinas | 4–3 |
| 6th | (Thailand) Mono Vampire | 2–5 |
| 7th | (Chinese Taipei) Taipei Dacin Tigers | 3–4 |
| 8th | (United Arab Emirates) Shabab Al-Ahli Dubai | 1–6 |
| 9th | (Palestine) Sareyyet Ramallah | 1–3 |
| 10th | (India) ONGC | 0–4 |

== Awards ==
2017 FIBA Asia Champions Cup

Sporting Al Riyadi Beirut
2nd title

Most Valuable Player
(United States) (Bulgaria) Darius Adams

=== All-Star Five ===
| Pos | Player | Club |
|---|---|---|
| G | (United States) (Bulgaria) Darius Adams (MVP) | (China) Xinjiang Flying Tigers |
| G | (United States) Quincy Douby | (Lebanon) Sporting Al Riyadi Beirut |
| C | (United States) Chris Daniels | (Lebanon) Sporting Al Riyadi Beirut |
| F | (Iran) Arsalan Kazemi | (Iran) Petrochimi Bandar Imam BC |
| F | (United States) Justin Carter | (Kazakhstan) BC Astana |
