= Isaiah Austin =

American basketball player (born 1993)

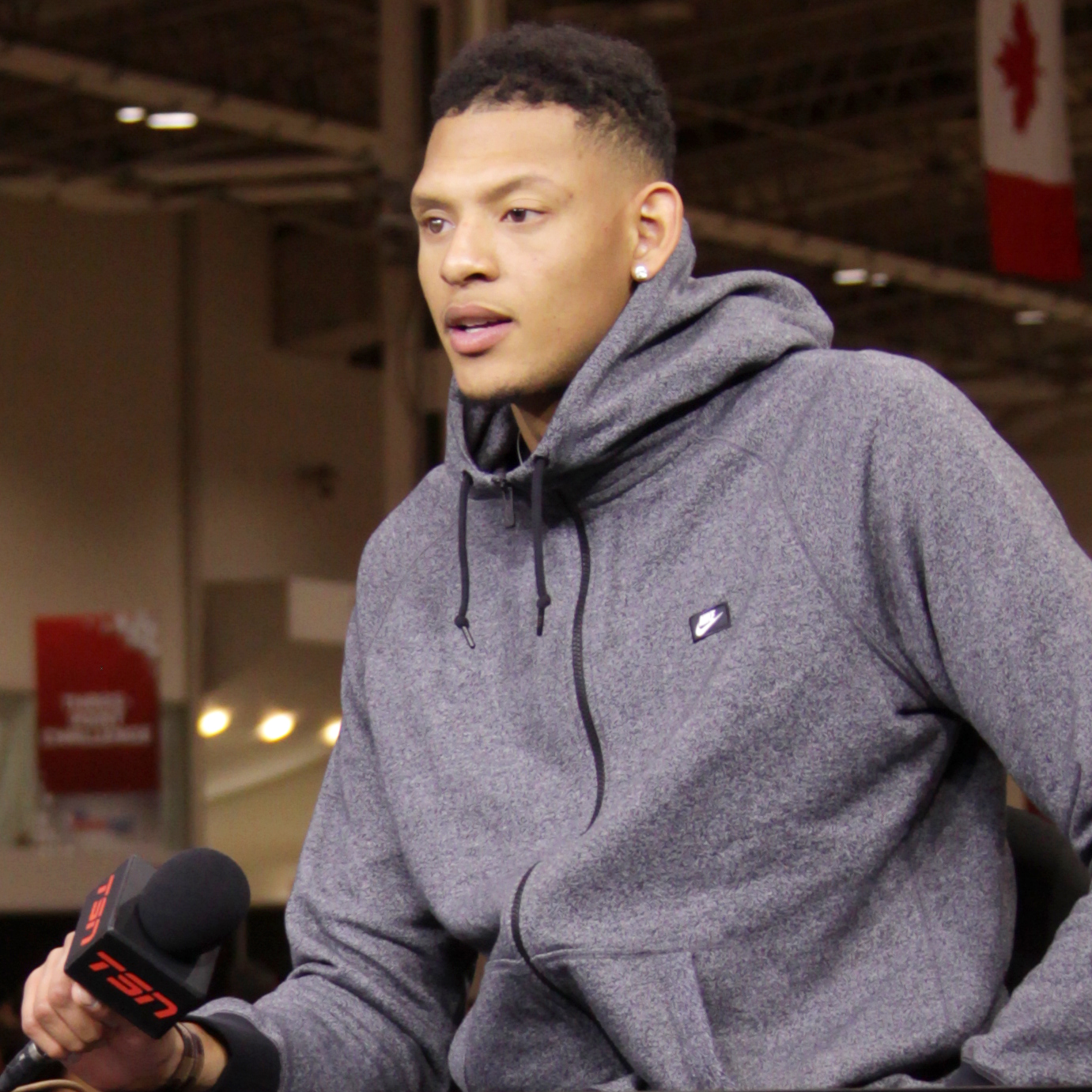
- Austin in 2016

Florida Atlantic Owls
- Title: Assistant coach
- League: American Athletic Conference

Personal information
- Born: October 25, 1993 (age 33) Fresno, California, U.S.
- Listed height: 7 ft 1 in (2.16 m)
- Listed weight: 225 lb (102 kg)

Career information
- High school: Grace Preparatory Academy (Arlington, Texas)
- College: Baylor (2012–2014)
- Playing career: 2017–2021
- Position: Center
- Coaching career: 2024–present

Career history

Playing
- 2017: FMP
- 2017: Guangxi Rhinos
- 2017: Yulon Luxgen Dinos
- 2018: Champville SC
- 2018: Guangxi Rhinos
- 2018–2019: Nanjing Monkey King
- 2019: Beirut Club
- 2020: Mets de Guaynabo
- 2020: Panteras de Aguascalientes
- 2020–2021: Al Naser Dubai
- 2021: San Carlos
- 2021: Indios de Mayagüez

Coaching
- 2024–present: Florida Atlantic (assistant)

Career highlights
- McDonald's All-American (2012); NIT champion (2013); Third-team All-Big 12 (2013); Big 12 All-Rookie Team (2013); Big 12 All-Defensive Team (2014)

Isaiah Charles Austin (born October 25, 1993) is an American basketball coach and former professional player who is an assistant coach for the Florida Atlantic Owls men's team. He played two years of college basketball for Baylor University and was set to enter the NBA in 2014 until he was diagnosed with a mild form of Marfan syndrome. In 2016, he was cleared to continue playing basketball after a two-year stint away from the game. Between 2017 and 2021, he played professionally overseas.

== High school career ==
Austin attended Grace Preparatory Academy in Arlington, Texas. As a senior in 2011–12, he averaged 15 points, 11 rebounds and five blocks per game, earning back-to-back Fort Worth Star-Telegram Super Team Player of the Year honors. Austin participated in the 2012 McDonald's All-American Game, 2012 Adidas Nations and the 2012 Jordan Brand Classic. He was named to the ESPNHS All-American Elite second team and was the nation's no. 3 recruit according to ESPN.

== College career ==
As a freshman at Baylor in 2012–13, Austin earned third-team All-Big 12 and Big 12 All-Rookie Team honors. On April 4, 2013, he recorded 15 points, nine rebounds, five blocks, four assists and two steals in the NIT championship game in which Baylor defeated Iowa 74–54. In 35 games (all starts), he averaged 13.0 points, 8.3 rebounds, 1.1 assists and 1.7 blocks in 29.9 minutes per game.

In April 2013, Austin declared for the 2013 NBA draft, but later returned to Baylor due to a shoulder injury.

As a sophomore in 2013–14, Austin earned Big 12 All-Defensive Team honors. In 38 games, he averaged 11.2 points, 5.5 rebounds, 1.4 assists and 3.1 blocks in 28.0 minutes per game.

On April 22, 2014, Austin declared for the 2014 NBA draft, forgoing his final two years of college eligibility.

== Professional career ==
=== Marfan syndrome diagnosis ===
On June 22, 2014, Austin learned that he had been diagnosed with a mild case of Marfan syndrome, a genetic disorder that affects the body's connective tissue, which caused NBA teams to reassess selecting him. In response, NBA commissioner Adam Silver invited Austin to attend the draft as his guest. Shortly after Austin's diagnosis was made public, his agent revealed that Austin had taken out an insurance policy against career-ending disability through a special NCAA program, which was worth at least $1 million. The policy would not have paid out if Austin's career ended due to his eyesight or his shoulder, but was expected to pay out due to his Marfan diagnosis.

On June 26, 2014, between the 15th and 16th picks of the 2014 NBA draft, NBA Commissioner Adam Silver made Austin a ceremonial pick, which fulfilled his dream of getting drafted. The crowd gave him a standing ovation as he walked up to the podium. He was offered a job in the NBA by Adam Silver, with the stipulation that he finish his degree at Baylor University.

=== Return to basketball ===
On November 30, 2016, Austin was medically cleared to play basketball and began considering offers from overseas. On January 7, 2017, he signed his first professional contract with Serbian club FMP. He made his debut for FMP on January 15, 2017, recording nine points and four rebounds in a 92–85 win over Mornar Bar. In 12 KLS games, he averaged 7.6 points and 3.9 rebounds per game. He also averaged 9.1 points, 3.2 rebounds and 1.2 blocks in nine Adriatic League games.

In July 2017, Austin joined Guangxi Rhinos of the Chinese NBL. In 16 games for Guangxi, he averaged 34.6 points, 13.4 rebounds, 2.8 assists, 1.1 steals and 4.3 blocks per game.

On November 11, 2017, Austin signed with the Yulon Luxgen Dinos of the Super Basketball League. He appeared in three games for Yulon before leaving the team in mid-December.

On January 20, 2018, Austin signed with Champville of the Lebanese Basketball League. He appeared in four games for Champville before leaving the team in February.

In June 2018, Austin re-joined Guangxi Rhinos of the Chinese NBL. In 32 games, he averaged 33.2 points, 10.4 rebounds, 2.6 assists and 1.7 blocks per game.

On October 16, 2018, Austin signed with Nanjing Monkey King of the Chinese Basketball Association. In 34 games, he averaged 17.0 points, 8.5 rebounds and 2.1 blocks per game.

On August 18, 2019, Austin signed with Beirut Club of the Lebanese Basketball League. He appeared in four games for Beirut in October 2019.

In December 2019, Austin joined Mets de Guaynabo for their return to the Baloncesto Superior Nacional in 2020. As an expansion team, the Mets were allowed to sign three "import players," or players not native to Puerto Rico. In four games, he averaged 16.0 points, 8.0 rebounds, 1.8 assists and 1.5 blocks per game. On September 30, 2020, Austin signed with Panteras de Aguascalientes of the Mexican Liga Nacional de Baloncesto Profesional.

In December 2020, Austin joined Al Naser Dubai. He then had a five-game stint in the Dominican Republic with San Carlos in May 2021.

On August 29, 2021, Austin signed with Indios de Mayagüez of the Baloncesto Superior Nacional.

=== BIG3 career ===
On June 15, 2021, Austin was selected with the 1st overall pick by Enemies in the 2021 BIG3 draft.

== National team career ==
In September 2017, the Samahang Basketbol ng Pilipinas began the process of including Austin in their men's national basketball team, to be considered as a naturalized player in the future. He suited up as an import for Chooks-to-Go Pilipinas, the national team competing as a club, at the 2017 FIBA Asia Champions Cup. They finished the tournament in fifth place, with Austin recording 37 points, 15 rebounds, six assists and six blocks in their final game of the tournament.

== Post-playing career ==
In September 2021, Austin retired from playing professionally and joined the NBA's front office for the 2021–22 season.

Austin joined the Florida Atlantic Owls as an assistant coach in 2024.

== Career statistics ==
=== Adriatic League ===
Season	Team	League	GP	MPG	FG%	3P%	FT%	RPG	APG	SPG	BPG	PPG
2016–17	FMP	Adriatic League	9	15.6	.525	.429	.600	3.2	0.4	0.1	1.2	9.1

=== FIBA Asia Champions Cup ===
Season	Team	League	GP	MPG	FG%	3P%	FT%	RPG	APG	SPG	BPG	PPG
2017	Chooks-To-Go Pilipinas	FIBA Asia Champions Cup	7	32.6	.553	.167	.732	13.0	2.4	0.4	3.1	20.0

== Personal life ==
Austin is partially blind in his right eye from a spontaneous retinal detachment that occurred during middle school. He had kept the visual loss a secret, known only to his teammates and close friends until January 17, 2014.

On December 16, 2014, Austin was put into 2K Sports' NBA 2K15 as a free agent.

Austin is the nephew of nine-year NBA veteran Isaac Austin.
