= Sri Aurobindo Institute of Medical Sciences =

Education organization in Indore, India

- श्री अरबिंदो चिकित्सकीय विज्ञान संस्थान
- SAIMS Logo
- Type: Private
- Established: 2003
- Affiliations: Sri Aurobindo University, NMC
- Endowment: ₹14.01 billion (US$150 million)
- Dean: Dr. R. R. Wavare
- Director: Dr. Vinod Bhandari
- Faculty: 710
- Location: Indore, Madhya Pradesh, India; 22.797°N 75.845°E
- Website: www.saimsonline.com

The Sri Aurobindo Institute of Medical Sciences (SAIMS) is a private medical college located in Indore, Madhya Pradesh, India. Its medical college component, Sri Aurobindo Medical College and Post Graduate Institute (SAMC & PGI), provides undergraduate (MBBS) and postgraduate (MD/MS/DM/MCh) medical education and is attached to a multi-speciality teaching hospital complex on the same campus. Regulatory documents list the college in the NMC seat matrix for undergraduate and postgraduate courses.

== Background ==
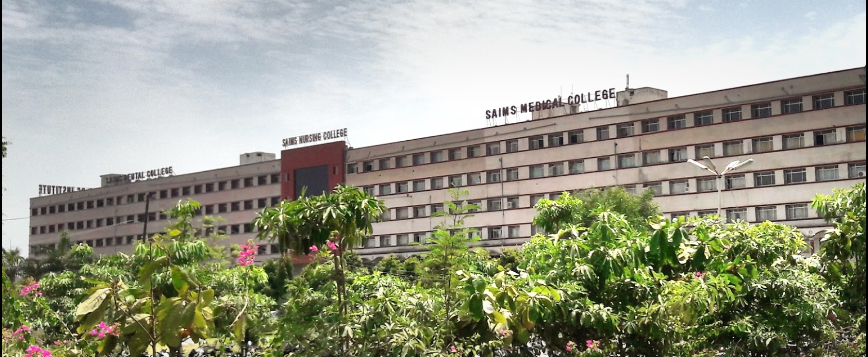
Photograph of SAIMS main building

The institute was established by Dr. Vinod Bhandari in 2003. It is named after the Indian yogi and philosopher Sri Aurobindo.

SAIMS also has the largest campus among medical colleges in Madhya Pradesh. The institute was recognized as the International Center of Excellence for Bariatric & Metabolic Surgery by Surgical Review Corporation (SRC), USA in the year 2012.

The institute became the first Indian centre of excellence solely devoted to training and research & development in the realm of minimally invasive surgery in November 2023, when it entered into a joint venture with IRCAD. IRCAD India is headed by its President Dr. Mohit Bhandari. The agreement helps the availability of expensive medical instruments to patients in India and nurture the next generation of surgeons through artificial intelligence (AI) and augmented reality (AR).

== Campus and teaching hospitals ==
The campus is located on the Indore–Ujjain highway and comprises academic buildings, hostels and an attached hospital complex that provides clinical training and outpatient/inpatient services.

=== Mohak Hitech Speciality Hospital / Mohak Bariatrics & Robotics ===
Mohak Hitech Speciality Hospital (also publicly referenced as Mohak Bariatrics & Robotics) operates within the SAIMS campus and is staffed by surgeons who are also associated with the medical college. Mohak has been covered in national media for bariatric and minimally invasive surgery innovations performed at its Indore facility, including early reporting of endoscopic and robotic bariatric procedures.

In July 2025 multiple specialised and trade outlets reported that Mohak Bariatrics (in collaboration with technology partners and visiting surgeons) participated in long-distance robotic/telerobotic bariatric procedures which organisers described as pioneering telerobotic bariatric surgeries; reporting attributes the claim to the organisations involved. These accounts appeared in bariatric-specialist press and industry wire releases.

== Academics ==
=== Undergraduate ===
SAMC & PGI offers the MBBS programme; regulatory documentation and the NMC seat matrix list the college in the national undergraduate seat allocations.

=== Postgraduate and training ===
The campus offers MD/MS and super-specialty training in several disciplines and hosts an NMC-recognised Regional Centre for Medical Education Technologies (RCMET) for faculty development.

== Research, accreditation and external recognition ==
In 2023 SAIMS was listed on the ESMO (European Society for Medical Oncology) site as an ESMO-designated centre for integrated oncology and palliative care (accreditation period 2024–2026), reflecting external recognition in oncology services.

IRCAD India — the surgical training centre established in partnership with the IRCAD network — is located at the SAU/SAIMS campus and has been the venue for hands-on surgical workshops and courses reported in specialised healthcare press.

== Admissions ==
Admissions to the MBBS programme are through the national NEET-UG examination and for postgraduate seats through NEET-PG, followed by central/state counselling as per NMC and state regulations.

== Media coverage and notable events ==
A number of independent media reports have covered SAIMS and its associated hospital complex:

- During the COVID-19 pandemic SAIMS hospital was cited in national media in connection with early plasma therapy treatments for critically ill patients in Indore.
- In September 2023 healthcare trade media reported that SAIMS announced that postgraduate students admitted that year would be exempt from paying tuition fees—a matter covered as an institutional decision.

== Sister institutions and hospitals ==
- Sri Aurobindo Institute of Technology (Engineering)
- Sri Aurobindo Institute of Medical Sciences Hospital
- Sri Aurobindo Institute of Medical College & PG Institute
- Sri Aurobindo College of Dentistry & PG Institute
- Sri Aurobindo Institute of Medical Sciences College of Nursing
- Sri Aurobindo Institute of Medical Sciences College of Allied Health & Paramedical Studies
- Sri Aurobindo Institute of Speech & Hearing
- Mohak Hitech Speciality Hospital
- Mohak Cancer Hospital
- Sri Aurobindo Institute of Laser Treatment
- Sri Aurobindo Institute of Library and Information Science
- Sri Aurobindo Institute of Management and Science
- Sri Aurobindo Institute of Pharmacy
- Laparoscopy Academy of Surgical Education and Research (LASER)

Other associated and acquired institutions and hospitals-

- Bhandari Hospital and Research Centre
- Indore Institute of Medical Sciences
