= Roderick Riley =

American basketball player

Personal information
- Born: March 11, 1981 (age 45)
- Listed height: 6 ft 11 in (2.11 m)
- Listed weight: 327 lb (148 kg)

Career information
- High school: Beaumont Central (Beaumont, Texas)
- College: Prairie View A&M (1999–2004)
- NBA draft: 2004: undrafted
- Playing career: 2004–2010
- Position: Center

Career history
- 2004: BC Vozko
- 2005: Mitteldeutscher BC
- 2005: Pennsylvania Valley Dawgs
- 2005: Coast Buick
- 2005–2006: Fayetteville Patriots
- 2006: Ulsan Mobis
- 2006–2007: Bakersfield Jam
- 2008: Colorado 14ers
- 2008–2009: Sporting Feytroun
- 2009: Jalaa Aleppo
- 2009: Al Riyadi Beirut
- 2009: Zain
- 2010: Austin Spurs

Career highlights
- Jordanian League champion (2009); 1st Regionalliga Nord winner (2005)

Roderick Riley (born March 11, 1981) is an American former basketball player. He played the center position and had a listed height and weight of 6'11" and 327 lbs. In 2009, he won the Jordanian Premier League with Zain.

== Early life and college career ==
Riley attended Beaumont Central High School in Beaumont, Texas. He played college basketball at Prairie View A&M. Riley missed part of his sophomore season due to a knee injury. He started his sophomore season and averaged 9.4 points per game. Riley lost 30 pounds going into his junior season. He helped Prairie View A&M capture the SWAC regular season title as a junior. Riley eared Second Team All-SWAC honors. Riley was suspended for four games during his senior season due to disciplinary reasons.

== Professional career ==
Riley signed with Mitteldeutscher BC in January 2005 after a bitter transfer dispute with Ukraine club BC Vozko. He averaged a team leading 10.8 rebounds per game for the season and helped Mitteldeutscher finish first in the 1st Regionalliga Nord.

In May 2005, Riley joined the Pennsylvania ValleyDawgs of the USBL. In the summer of 2005, Riley joined Coast Star of the Jersey Shore Basketball League. In one game, he scored 32 points and had 18 rebounds and three blocks.

In January 2006, he signed with Ulsan Mobis of the Korean Basketball League. He left the team in March after suffering a knee injury.

He played several seasons in the D League for the Fayetteville Patriots and from 2006 to 2007 he played for the Bakersfield Jam. In 2018, Riley joined the Colorado 14ers.

In April 2009, Riley signed with Jordanian club Zain where he went on to win the Jordanian Premier League. He also played for the team during the 2009 FIBA Asia Champions Cup where it finished as the runner-up.
