= 2009 FIBA Asia Champions Cup =

Official logo

The FIBA Asia Champions Cup 2009 was the 20th staging of the FIBA Asia Champions Cup, the basketball club tournament of FIBA Asia. The tournament was held in Jakarta, Indonesia between May 12, 2009 and May 20.

== Preliminary round ==
=== Group A ===
Team	Pld	W	L	PF	PA	PD	Pts
(Iran) Mahram Tehran	4	4	0	395	284	+111	8
(Philippines) Smart Gilas	4	3	1	366	353	+13	7
(Lebanon) Al-Riyadi Beirut	4	2	2	331	342	−11	6
(South Korea) Sangmu Phoenix	4	1	3	287	343	−56	5
(Kuwait) Al-Qadsia	4	0	4	317	374	−57	4

May 12
14:00

Al-Riyadi (Lebanon)	87–78	(Kuwait) Al-Qadsia
Scoring by quarter: 22–18, 18–24, 19–16, 28–20

Kelapa Gading Sport Mall, Jakarta

May 12
16:00

Smart Gilas (Philippines)	90–76	(South Korea) Sangmu
Scoring by quarter: 22–19, 18–16, 29–23, 21–18

Kelapa Gading Sport Mall, Jakarta

May 13
14:00

Mahram (Iran)	98–87	(Philippines) Smart Gilas
Scoring by quarter: 16–24, 28–22, 31–17, 23–24

Kelapa Gading Sport Mall, Jakarta

May 13
16:00

Sangmu (South Korea)	86–97	(Lebanon) Al-Riyadi
Scoring by quarter: 17–30, 21–26, 28–21, 20–20

Kelapa Gading Sport Mall, Jakarta

May 14
14:00

Al-Qadsia (Kuwait)	66–69	(South Korea) Sangmu
Scoring by quarter: 18–20, 16–19, 18–7, 14–23

Kelapa Gading Sport Mall, Jakarta

May 14
16:00

Al-Riyadi (Lebanon)	61–87	(Iran) Mahram
Scoring by quarter: 12–29, 15–24, 17–14, 17–20

Kelapa Gading Sport Mall, Jakarta

May 15
14:00

Smart Gilas (Philippines)	91–86	(Lebanon) Al-Riyadi
Scoring by quarter: 26–15, 23–19, 16–31, 26–21

Kelapa Gading Sport Mall, Jakarta

May 15
16:00

Mahram (Iran)	120–80	(Kuwait) Al-Qadsia
Scoring by quarter: 33–27, 25–15, 32–16, 30–22

Kelapa Gading Sport Mall, Jakarta

May 16
18:00

Al-Qadsia (Kuwait)	93–98	(Philippines) Smart Gilas
Scoring by quarter: 31–16, 18–30, 27–23, 17–29

Kelapa Gading Sport Mall, Jakarta

May 16
20:00

Sangmu (South Korea)	56–90	(Iran) Mahram
Scoring by quarter: 13–22, 12–22, 10–25, 21–21

Kelapa Gading Sport Mall, Jakarta

=== Group B ===
Team	Pld	W	L	PF	PA	PD	Pts	Tiebreaker
(Jordan) Zain	4	4	0	352	257	+95	8	
(Indonesia) Satria Muda BritAma	4	2	2	312	303	+9	6	1–0
(Qatar) Al-Arabi	4	2	2	324	320	+4	6	0–1
(India) Young Cagers	4	1	3	263	333	−70	5	1–0
(United Arab Emirates) Al-Wasl	4	1	3	303	341	−38	5	0–1

May 12
18:00

Al-Wasl (United Arab Emirates)	83–78	(Indonesia) Satria Muda
Scoring by quarter: 25–18, 16–20, 25–18, 17–22

Kelapa Gading Sport Mall, Jakarta

May 12
20:00

Young Cagers (India)	59–90	(Jordan) Zain
Scoring by quarter: 13–24, 17–24, 8–27, 21–15

Kelapa Gading Sport Mall, Jakarta

May 13
18:00

Al-Arabi (Qatar)	88–63	(India) Young Cagers
Scoring by quarter: 21–12, 24–13, 23–13, 20–25

Kelapa Gading Sport Mall, Jakarta

May 13
20:00

Zain (Jordan)	84–65	(United Arab Emirates) Al-Wasl
Scoring by quarter: 19–17, 15–13, 21–20, 29–15

Kelapa Gading Sport Mall, Jakarta

May 14
18:00

Satria Muda (Indonesia)	71–84	(Jordan) Zain
Scoring by quarter: 16–23, 17–17, 16–23, 22–21

Kelapa Gading Sport Mall, Jakarta

May 14
20:00

Al-Wasl (United Arab Emirates)	79–97	(Qatar) Al-Arabi
Scoring by quarter: 17–23, 19–28, 23–23, 20–23

Kelapa Gading Sport Mall, Jakarta

May 15
18:00

Al-Arabi (Qatar)	77–84	(Indonesia) Satria Muda
Scoring by quarter: 23–25, 18–21, 18–15, 18–23

Kelapa Gading Sport Mall, Jakarta

May 15
20:00

Young Cagers (India)	82–76	(United Arab Emirates) Al-Wasl
Scoring by quarter: 13–20, 22–14, 23–17, 24–25

Kelapa Gading Sport Mall, Jakarta

May 16
14:00

Satria Muda (Indonesia)	79–59	(India) Young Cagers
Scoring by quarter: 14–15, 17–15, 28–11, 20–18

Kelapa Gading Sport Mall, Jakarta

May 16
16:00

Zain (Jordan)	94–62	(Qatar) Al-Arabi
Scoring by quarter: 20–19, 20–16, 30–12, 24–15

Kelapa Gading Sport Mall, Jakarta

== Knockout round ==
=== Championship ===
Quarter-finals
May 17 – Jakarta
(India) Young Cagers	73
(Iran) Mahram	97
May 17 – Jakarta
(Lebanon) Al-Riyadi	86
(Indonesia) Satria Muda	69
May 17 – Jakarta
(South Korea) Sangmu	70
(Jordan) Zain	89
May 17 – Jakarta
(Qatar) Al-Arabi	76
(Philippines) Smart Gilas	71

Semi-finals
May 19 – Jakarta
(Iran) Mahram	109
(Lebanon) Al-Riyadi	80
May 19 – Jakarta
(Jordan) Zain	113
(Qatar) Al-Arabi	57

Final
May 20 – Jakarta
(Iran) Mahram	78
(Jordan) Zain	68
Third place
May 20 – Jakarta
(Lebanon) Al-Riyadi	94
(Qatar) Al-Arabi	81

=== 5th–8th places ===
Semi-finals
May 19 – Jakarta
(India) Young Cagers	61
(Indonesia) Satria Muda	83
May 19 – Jakarta
(South Korea) Sangmu	78
(Philippines) Smart Gilas	98

Fifth place
May 20 – Jakarta
(Indonesia) Satria Muda	107
(Philippines) Smart Gilas (OT)	112
Seventh place
May 20 – Jakarta
(India) Young Cagers	61
(South Korea) Sangmu	72

=== Quarterfinals ===
May 17
14:00

Young Cagers (India)	73–97	(Iran) Mahram
Scoring by quarter: 13–31, 11–19, 26–28, 23–19
Pts: J. Singh 24; Rebs: J. Singh 8 Asts: Kadam, Bhriguvanshi, J. Singh 2		Pts: Vroman 22; Rebs: Vroman 7 Asts: Kamrani 4

Kelapa Gading Sport Mall, Jakarta

May 17
16:00

Sangmu (South Korea)	70–89	(Jordan) Zain
Scoring by quarter: 13–22, 19–19, 12–24, 26–24
Pts: No K.S. 18; Rebs: Joo T.S. 5 Asts: Yang H.J. 5		Pts: Riley 18; Rebs: Riley 11; Asts: Daghlas 6

Kelapa Gading Sport Mall, Jakarta

May 17
18:00

Al-Riyadi (Lebanon)	86–69	(Indonesia) Satria Muda
Scoring by quarter: 27–18, 14–21, 22–7, 23–23
Pts: El Khatib 30; Rebs: Charles 11; Asts: Charles, El Khatib 4		Pts: Powell, Miller 22; Rebs: Miller 12; Asts: Powell, Gunawan 3

Kelapa Gading Sport Mall, Jakarta

May 17
20:00

Al-Arabi (Qatar)	76–71	(Philippines) Smart Gilas
Scoring by quarter: 21–12, 8–23, 21–17, 26–19
Pts: Ali 20; Rebs: Ali 13; Asts: Hargrow 6		Pts: Giles 20; Rebs: Giles 18; Asts: Barroca, Casio 5

Kelapa Gading Sport Mall, Jakarta

=== Semifinals ===
May 19
14:00

5th–8th

Sangmu (South Korea)	78–98	(Philippines) Smart Gilas
Scoring by quarter: 21–17, 17–31, 21–23, 19–27
Pts: Park B.C. 24; Rebs: Yang H.J., Kim B.S. 5 Asts: No K.S., Han J.W. 4		Pts: Giles 16; Rebs: Giles 16; Asts: Barroca 8

Kelapa Gading Sport Mall, Jakarta

May 19
16:00

5th–8th

Young Cagers (India)	61–83	(Indonesia) Satria Muda
Scoring by quarter: 11–16, 16–21, 16–28, 18–18
Pts: J. Singh 17; Rebs: J. Singh 13; Asts: Kadam 4		Pts: Miller 25; Rebs: Miller 21; Asts: Ahmad 5

Kelapa Gading Sport Mall, Jakarta

May 19
18:00

Semis

Mahram (Iran)	109–80	(Lebanon) Al-Riyadi
Scoring by quarter: 26–14, 30–17, 27–24, 26–25
Pts: Vroman 27; Rebs: Lauderdale 14; Asts: Kamrani 5		Pts: Johnson 26; Rebs: Charles 8 Asts: Johnson 5

Kelapa Gading Sport Mall, Jakarta

May 19
20:00

Semis

Zain (Jordan)	113–57	(Qatar) Al-Arabi
Scoring by quarter: 23–15, 29–15, 32–12, 29–15
Pts: Riley 18; Rebs: Riley 11; Asts: Al-Awadi 5		Pts: Hargrow 16; Rebs: Jones 7 Asts: Ali 2

Kelapa Gading Sport Mall, Jakarta

=== Finals ===
May 19
12:00

9th–10th

Al-Qadsia (Kuwait)	vs.	(United Arab Emirates) Al-Wasl
Cancelled

Kelapa Gading Sport Mall, Jakarta

May 20
14:00

7th–8th

Young Cagers (India)	61–72	(South Korea) Sangmu
Scoring by quarter: 14–21, 18–17, 16–13, 13–21
Pts: J. Singh 18; Rebs: J. Singh 7 Asts: Bhriguvanshi, J. Singh 3		Pts: Yang H.J. 22; Rebs: Yang H.J., Chung B.K. 7 Asts: Chung B.K., Kim B.S. 3

Kelapa Gading Sport Mall, Jakarta

May 20
16:00

5th–6th

Satria Muda (Indonesia)	107–112 (OT)	(Philippines) Smart Gilas
Scoring by quarter: 23–26, 21–21, 13–21, 37–26, Overtime: 13–18
Pts: Miller 41; Rebs: Miller 21; Asts: Ahmad 6		Pts: Barroca 31; Rebs: Giles 17; Asts: Barroca 10

Kelapa Gading Sport Mall, Jakarta

May 20
18:00

Bronze

Al-Riyadi (Lebanon)	94–81	(Qatar) Al-Arabi
Scoring by quarter: 26–12, 32–22, 17–28, 19–19
Pts: Charles 24; Rebs: Charles 17; Asts: Beshara 7		Pts: Hargrow 20; Rebs: Abdelqader 15; Asts: Hargrow 8

Kelapa Gading Sport Mall, Jakarta

May 20
20:00

Gold

Mahram (Iran)	78–68	(Jordan) Zain
Scoring by quarter: 19–22, 16–11, 18–16, 25–19
Pts: Vroman 19; Rebs: Vroman, Nikkhah 10; Asts: Kamrani, Vroman 3		Pts: Dais 22; Rebs: Riley 12; Asts: Daghlas 7

Kelapa Gading Sport Mall, Jakarta

== Final standings ==
Rank	Team	Record
Gold medal	(Iran) Mahram Tehran	7–0
Silver medal	(Jordan) Zain	6–1
Bronze medal	(Lebanon) Al-Riyadi Beirut	4–3
4th	(Qatar) Al-Arabi	3–4
5th	(Philippines) Smart Gilas	5–2
6th	(Indonesia) Satria Muda BritAma	3–4
7th	(South Korea) Sangmu Phoenix	2–5
8th	(India) Young Cagers	1–6
Failed to Reach Quarterfinals
	(United Arab Emirates) Al-Wasl	1–3
	(Kuwait) Al-Qadsia	0–4

== Awards ==
- Most Valuable Player: (United States) Jackson Vroman (Mahram)
