= Pilipinas Commercial Basketball League =

Pilipinas Commercial Basketball League (PCBL)
- Most recent season or competition: 2016 PCBL Chairman's Cup
- Sport: Basketball
- Founded: October 11, 2015
- First season: 2015
- Folded: 2016
- Director: Buddy Encarnado
- Commissioner: Joel Banal
- Country: Philippines
- Continent: Asia
- Last champion: Jumbo Plastic Linoleum Giants
- Most titles: Jumbo Plastic Linoleum Giants (2 titles)
- Broadcaster: AksyonTV

Pilipinas Commercial Basketball League (also known as PCBL) was a commercial amateur basketball tournament based in the Philippines that catered to the development and grassroots program for future Filipino basketball players, inspired from the MICAA and the Philippine Basketball League (PBL). The league was established by nine commercial teams, some of which have played in the PBA D-League. The chairman of the league was Buddy Encarnado, who was also the board governor representing the Sta. Lucia Realtors during its stint in the Philippine Basketball Association (PBA).

The PCBL was sanctioned and officiated by the Samahang Basketbol ng Pilipinas (SBP), the Philippine governing body of basketball. The league was tasked by the SBP to form the national basketball teams that will participate in the Southeast Asia Basketball (SEABA) and the Southeast Asian Games, replacing the Gilas Cadets program.

== History ==
The league envisioned a three-conference first season (2015-2016). Its inaugural conference, the Founders Cup, began on October 11, 2015. The games were held at the Pasig City Sports Center and Filoil Flying V Arena. Games are aired on AksyonTV on a delayed basis.

The second conference, which started in March 2016, was envisioned to be an import-reinforced tournament, while the third conference called the Commissioner's Cup will be an invitational tournament, and the fourth conference Homegrown Cup will be an All-Filipino conference. The PCBL also planned to have out-of-town games in Baguio, Lipa, Batangas and Lucena.

The PCBL's second conference was headed by four returning teams - Jumbo Plastic Linoleum Giants, Euro-Med, Supremo Lex Builders, Foton, Sta. Lucia Realty, and new teams, Mighty Sports and SCTEX Road Warriors.

On May 27, 2016, the 2016 PCBL Chairman's Cup title was awarded to Jumbo Plastic Linoleum Giants, setting the first record for back to back championship wins for the Pilipinas Commercial Basketball League, after beating the star-studded Mighty Sports 80–68 on game 3.

== Former teams ==
PCBL teams
Team	Company	Colors	Team manager	Head coach
Cagayan Valley Rising Suns	Alvaro Antonio		Frederic Collado	Ronnie Dojillo
Caida Tile Masters	Racal Group of Companies		N/A	Mike Buendia
Euro-Med Laboratories	Euro-Med Laboratories		N/A	Efren "Yong" Garcia
Foton Toplanders	United Asia Automotive Group, Inc.		Alvin Lu / Nico Ocampo	Jonathan Reyes
Jumbo Plastic Linoleum Giants	AliKaiser Manufacturing Corporation		Jefferson Dela Cruz	Stevenson Tiu
Kama Motors	Racal Group of Companies		N/A	Aries Dimaunahan
Mighty Sports	Mighty Sports Apparel and Accessories		Jean Alabanza	Mike Fermin
Biyaheng SCTEX	Manila North Tollways Corporation		Ronald Dulatre	Adonis Tierra
Sta. Lucia Realtors	Sta. Lucia Realty and Development Corporation		Buddy Encarnado	Bonnie Garcia
Supremo Lex Builders-Our Lady of Fatima University	Supremo Lex Architectural Design and Builders		Harlem Ruiz	Ralph Rivera

== Commissioners ==
- Ato Badolato (2015)
- Joel Banal (2016)

== PCBL champions ==
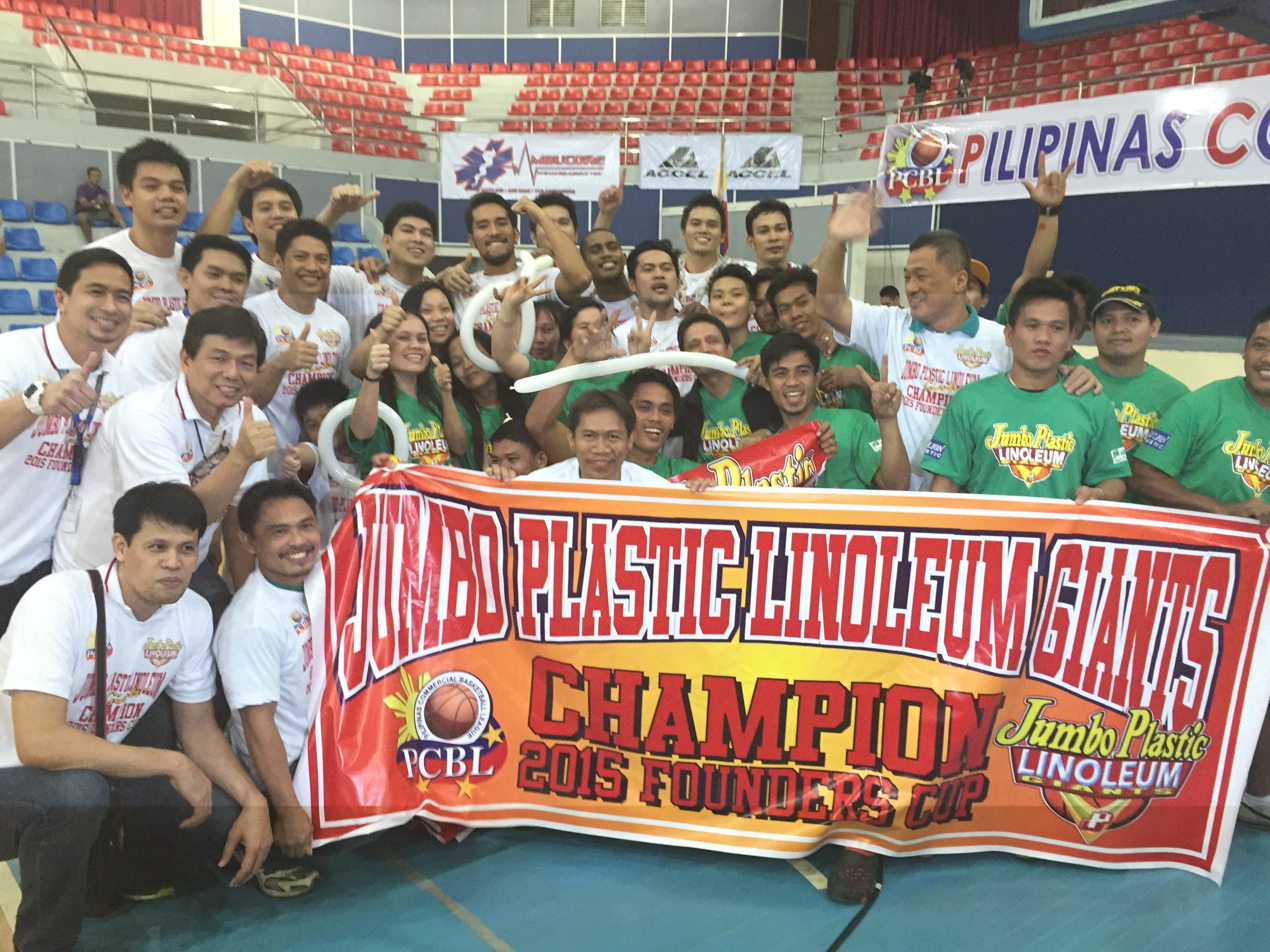
PCBL Champions Jumbo Plastic Linoleum Giants

Even though the league only operated for several months, the league crowned Jumbo Plastic Linoleum Giants as its champions for both conferences in its one and only season.

PCBL Champions
Season	Champions	Result	Runner-up
1	Jumbo Plastic	2–0	Euro-Med Laboratories
1	Jumbo Plastic	2–1	Mighty Sports-Malolos
