= Jumbo Plastic Linoleum Giants =

- Leagues: PBA D-League (2013–2015); PCBL (2015–2016)
- Founded: 2013
- Dissolved: 2016
- Team colors: Red, Yellow, White
- Head coach: (Philippines)
- Championships: PCBL 1st Foundation Cup 2015; PCBL 1st Chairman's Cup 2016
Home	Away

Jumbo Plastic Linoleum Giants was a basketball team that played in the Pilipinas Commercial Basketball League (PCBL) and debuted during the 2013 Foundation Cup of the PBA D-League.

== 2013–2015 PBA D-League record ==
Jumbo Plastic over the past 5 conferences have reached the quarter-finals twice, and semi-finals once, being beaten by defending champion BlackWater Sports.

== 2015 Pilipinas Commercial Basketball League Foundation Cup ==
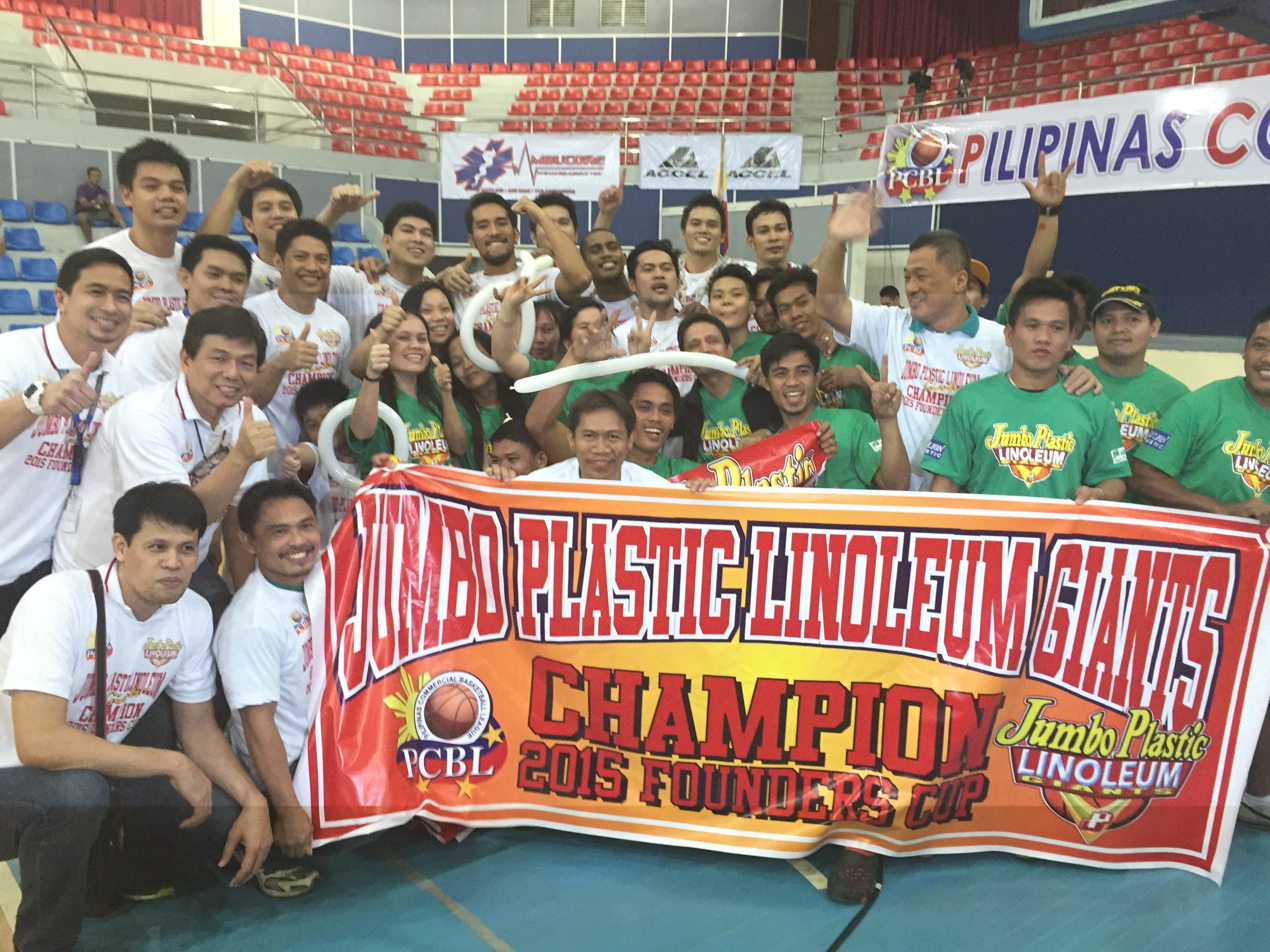
PCBL Champions Jumbo Plastic Linoleum Giants

Jumbo Plastic Linoleum Giants won the first ever Pilipinas Commercial Basketball League Foundation Cup December 20, 2015, against the Number 1 Seed Caida TileMaster. They were down as much as 17 points before they rallied and beat Caida; 79-73. Jumbo Plastic was ranked 2nd in this Conference with a W-L record of 6-4.

== 2015–2016 back to back championship roster ==
No.	Name	Height
3	James Martinez	5 ft 10 in
9	Jaymo Eguilos	6 ft 5 in
1	Aj Mandani	6 ft 0 in
2	Jeff Viernes	5 ft 7 in
10	Marcy Arellano	5 ft 9 in
17	Jay-R Taganas	6 ft 4 in
20	Stephen Siruma	6 ft 2 in
15	Allan Santos	6 ft 3 in
77	Jayson Ibay	6 ft 2 in
9	Jasper Atok	6 ft 0 in
3	Baraccuda Arafat	6 ft 6 in
11	Chris Bitoon	5 ft 11 in
Head coach	Stevenson Tiu	
Team President	Councilor Kaiser Atok	
Team manager	Atty. Ali Dobs	
