= Philippines men's national basketball team in FIBA club tournaments =

Philippines
- History: Northern Cement (1984–1985); San Miguel Philippines (2005); San Miguel-Magnolia (2007); Smart Gilas (2009–2011); Chooks-to-Go Pilipinas (2017)
- Main sponsor: Northern Cement (1984–1985); San Miguel (2005–2007); Smart Communications (2009–2011); Chooks-to-Go (2017)
- Head coach: Chot Reyes
- Ownership: Samahang Basketbol ng Pilipinas
- Championships: 1984 Asian Basketball Club Championship
Home	Away

The Philippines men's national basketball team has competed in FIBA competitions for basketball clubs such as the Basketball Champions League Asia. In such cases the national team competed, they played under a club name, usually after a sponsor.

At the FIBA Asia Champions Cup in particular, privately sponsored national teams has competed in the tournament. In other cases the Philippines competed in the tournament, the country was represented by teams from the now defunct Philippine Basketball League and Metropolitan Basketball Association. No Philippine Basketball Association team has competed in the tournament until the 2018 edition when Meralco Bolts entered the continental club tournament.

The team also competed one time at the 1985 FIBA Club World Cup.

The article scope excludes other basketball clubs or teams which competed in FIBA club tournaments such as Hapee Toothpaste of the defunct Philippine Basketball League.

== FIBA Asia Champions Cup ==
=== Northern Cement ===
The Northern Cement Corporation-sponsored national team participated in the 1984 Asian Basketball Club Championship which it won.

=== San Miguel ===
The national team sponsored by the San Miguel Corporation competed at the 2005 and 2007 FIBA Asia Champions Cups.

=== Smart Gilas ===
The Philippine national team under the Smart Gilas program competed under the name Smart Gilas at the FIBA Asia Champions Cup.

2009

The Philippines participated at the 2009 FIBA Asia Champions Cup. They were reinforced by American import, C. J. Giles who was a candidate for naturalization. The team finished fifth in the competition.

2010

The Philippines made a failed bid to host the 2010 FIBA Asia Champions Cup. Nevertheless, they decided to participate in the tournament.

2011

The national team participated for the third time at the 2011 FIBA Asia Champions Cup which the country hosted. All teams were eligible to field an import, including Smart Gilas, but it opted not to. United States-born Marcus Douthit was already a naturalized Filipino citizen at the time of competition. The team was guided by Serbian head coach, Rajko Toroman. The team settled for fourth place when Al-Rayyan of Qatar handed them a 64–71 defeat in the third place match.

=== Chooks-to-Go ===
On September 5, 2017, Philippine national team head coach, Chot Reyes announced that the country was to participate at the 2017 FIBA Asia Champions Cup. The team competed under the name Chooks-to-Go Pilipinas. After Japan withdrew from the tournament, FIBA requested the participation of the Philippines. Players from the national team extended pool and not Philippine Basketball Association players formed part of the team which competed in the tournament.

The national team did not see the services of naturalized player, Andray Blatche who played for his basketball club, China Kashgar. However, Blatche did not play when the Kashgar met Chooks-to-Go in the knockout rounds.

== 1985 FIBA Club World Cup ==
The national team under the Northern Cement banner competed at the 1985 FIBA Club World Cup. It was the sole Asian team in the competition.

== Competition records ==
FIBA Asia Champions Cup

Edition	National team club name	Result
1984	Northern Cement	(gold) 1st place
2005	San Miguel Philippines	5th place
2007	San Miguel-Magnolia	4th place
2009	Smart Gilas	5th place
2010	Smart Gilas	7th place
2011	Smart Gilas	4th place
2017	Chooks-to-Go Pilipinas	5th place
