= Mohit Bhandari =

Indian bariatric surgeon

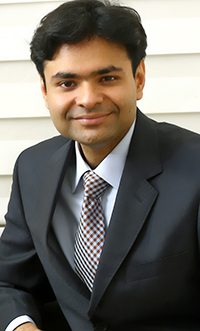
- Bhandari
- Born: 24 October 1980 (age 45); India
- Education: Mahatma Gandhi Memorial Medical College, Indore
- Occupation: Surgeon
- Known for: Minimal access surgery Bariatric surgery
- Spouse: Shilpa Bhandari
- Parent(s): Dr. Vinod Bhandari; Dr. Manjushree Bhandari
- Website: drmohitbhandari.com

Mohit Bhandari is an Indian bariatric surgeon specializing in laparoscopic, metabolic, and robotic surgery. As of 2026, he was reported to have performed more than 40,000 bariatric surgeries. He is the president of IRCAD India, a centre for training and research in minimally invasive surgery.

He is pro-chancellor of Sri Aurobindo Institute of Medical Sciences, Indore, director of bariatric surgery at Mohak Bariatrics and Robotics, and a director at Enliten.

== Career ==
He is one of the first surgeons to perform robotic bariatric surgery in India and the first Indian doctor to perform SADI-S surgery.

In 2013, Bhandari performed bariatric surgery on a six-year-old boy weighing about 60 kilograms at the Sri Aurobindo Institute of Medical Sciences in Indore; he said the boy was the youngest patient in India to undergo the procedure.

In 2020, Bhandari and colleagues published outcomes of endoscopic sleeve gastroplasty procedures performed at his centre from 2017, described in the journal Digestive Endoscopy as the first Indian experience with the procedure.

In July 2021, he was appointed as a specialist member by the National Board of Examinations (NBE), India, in connection with the development of a training program in obesity surgery. His role included contributing to institutional eligibility criteria, curriculum development, and examination standards for the program.

In September 2022, Allurion Technologies launched its weight-loss device in India following approval from the Central Drug Standard Control Organisation. Bhandari was associated with the introduction of the device in India and participated in clinical studies conducted before its approval.

== Telesurgery ==
In July 2025, Bhandari performed a robotic bariatric telesurgery from Gurugram on a patient in Indore, approximately 850 kilometres away. Later that month, he performed a robotic gastric bypass from Strasbourg, France, on a patient in Indore.

In May 2026, he performed a robotic gastrojejunostomy on a patient in Indore from Perth, Australia, a distance of approximately 10,000 kilometres, using the SSI Mantra surgical robotic system. The procedure was carried out during the 94th Annual Scientific Congress of the Royal Australasian College of Surgeons, held in Perth from 30 April to 3 May 2026.

== Records ==
- In 2015, he was listed in the Limca Book of Records in connection with a series of 25 bariatric surgeries performed within an eleven-hour period by a surgical team of approximately 40 members. The previous record had been attributed to surgeon Atul Peters, who performed 16 surgeries in a twelve-hour period. He also performed bariatric surgery on Dharamveer, a patient from Mauritius who was reported to weigh 410 kilograms, at Mohak Bariatrics and Robotics in Indore.
- On 15 August 2026, Bhandari led a team that performed 51 robotic bariatric surgeries in 14 hours using six robotic surgical systems, as part of an initiative called "Surgical Swaraj". Documentation from the event was submitted to Guinness World Records and the World Book of Records for verification.

== Personal life ==
He is married to Shilpa Bhagdikar, a gynaecologist and an In vitro fertilisation expert.
