= Sta. Lucia Realtors (PCBL) =

- Leagues: PCBL
- Founded: 2015
- Dissolved: 2016
- Team colors
- Main sponsor: Sta. Lucia Realty and Development Corporation
- Head coach: (Philippines) Bonnie Garcia

The Sta. Lucia Realtors were a basketball team owned by Sta. Lucia Realty and Development Corporation that played in the short-lived Pilipinas Commercial Basketball League (PCBL). The team debuted in the inaugural conference of the PCBL, the PCBL Founders Cup, on October 11, 2015.

The team was the second incarnation of the Sta. Lucia Realtors. The original Sta. Lucia Realtors played in the Philippine Basketball League (PBL) from 1987 to 1992 and moved to the Philippine Basketball Association (PBA) where it played from 1993 to 2010.

== See also ==
- Sta. Lucia Realtors (PBA)
- Sta. Lucia Lady Realtors (PSL volleyball team)
- Pasig Sta. Lucia Realtors (MPBL)
