= 2017 William Jones Cup =

International basketball tournament

Tournament information
- Dates: M: 15–23 July 2017; W: 5–9 July 2017
- Host: Taiwan
- Venue: 2
- Teams: M: 10; W: 6
- Website: 2017 William Jones Cup

Final positions
- Champions: M: Team Canada 150 (1st title, 2nd title for the country); W: Japan U24 (1st title, 2nd title for the country)
- 1st runners-up: M: (Lithuania) Atletas All-Star Lithuania; W: Chinese Taipei Blue
- 2nd runners-up: M: South Korea; W: New Zealand

The 2017 William Jones Cup was the 39th staging of William Jones Cup, an international basketball tournament held in Taipei, Taiwan.

== Men's tournament ==
=== Participating teams ===
- Atletas All-Star Lithuania
- Chinese Taipei Blue
- Chinese Taipei White
- India
- Iran
- Iraq
- Japan U24
- Philippines
- South Korea
- Team Canada 150 (Note: The team is not the Canadian national team. The team was organized by the 3D Global Sports Canada group and played as "Team Canada 150" in the tournament to commemorate the 150th anniversary of the Canadian Confederation.)

=== Team standings ===
| Team | Pld | W | L | PF | PA | PD | Pts | Tie |
|---|---|---|---|---|---|---|---|---|
| Team Canada 150 | 9 | 8 | 1 | 926 | 671 | +255 | 17 | 1–0 |
| Atletas All-Star Lithuania | 9 | 8 | 1 | 840 | 713 | +127 | 17 | 0–1 |
| South Korea | 9 | 6 | 3 | 781 | 739 | +42 | 15 | 1–0 |
| Philippines | 9 | 6 | 3 | 785 | 730 | +55 | 15 | 0–1 |
| Chinese Taipei Blue | 9 | 5 | 4 | 729 | 722 | +7 | 14 | N/A |
| Iraq | 9 | 4 | 5 | 697 | 751 | −54 | 13 | 1–0 |
| Iran | 9 | 4 | 5 | 712 | 710 | +2 | 13 | 0–1 |
| Japan U24 | 9 | 2 | 7 | 674 | 802 | −128 | 11 | 1–0 |
| Chinese Taipei White | 9 | 2 | 7 | 754 | 803 | −49 | 11 | 0–1 |
| India | 9 | 0 | 9 | 628 | 885 | −257 | 9 | N/A |

==== Day 1 ====
15 July
11:00

Report

| Iraq | 86–68 | India |
Scoring by quarter: 11–19, 28–13, 32–24, 15–12
| Pts: Mayfield 19; Rebs: Al-Hchaimi 10; Asts: Abdullah 4 | | Pts: Am. Singh 22; Rebs: Hafeez 9 Asts: Ambati, Sivakumar 4 |

Taipei Peace International Basketball Hall, Taipei

15 July
13:00

Report

| South Korea | 87–84 | Chinese Taipei White |
Scoring by quarter: 20–27, 23–14, 18–26, 26–17
| Pts: Lee Seung-hyun 18; Rebs: Kim Jong-kyu 9 Asts: Kim Sung-hyun 4 | | Pts: Chen Ying-chun 26; Rebs: Barone 10; Asts: Chen Ying-chun 8 |

Taipei Peace International Basketball Hall, Taipei

15 July
15:00

Report

| Team Canada 150 | 90–77 | Philippines |
Scoring by quarter: 19–20, 25–14, 22–20, 24–23
| Pts: Williamson 15; Rebs: Bachynski 6 Asts: Kapelan, Williamson 3 | | Pts: Ravena 12; Rebs: Standhardinger 10; Asts: 3 players 3 |

Taipei Peace International Basketball Hall, Taipei

15 July
17:00

Report

| Iran | 84–90 | Atletas All-Star Lithuania |
Scoring by quarter: 19–26, 20–19, 22–21, 23–24
| Pts: Rezaeifar 23; Rebs: Rezaeifar, Soleymani 6 Asts: Falahat, Mozafarivanani 4 | | Pts: Žaromskis 19; Rebs: 3 players 4 Asts: Volkus 4 |

Taipei Peace International Basketball Hall, Taipei

15 July
19:30

Report

| Chinese Taipei Blue | 86–65 | Japan U24 |
Scoring by quarter: 21–18, 25–11, 18–23, 22–13
| Pts: Chou Yi-hsiang 22; Rebs: Davis 11; Asts: Lu Zheng-ru 3 | | Pts: Hiraiwa 15; Rebs: Hiraiwa 7 Asts: Hara 3 |

Taipei Peace International Basketball Hall, Taipei

==== Day 2 ====
16 July
11:00

Report

| India | 67–92 | South Korea |
Scoring by quarter: 15–19, 13–31, 20–29, 19–13
| Pts: Bukankere Krishne Gowda 13; Rebs: Pethani 9 Asts: Hafeez 4 | | Pts: Heo Ung 22; Rebs: Choi Jun-yong 8 Asts: Jeon Jun-beon 5 |

Taipei Peace International Basketball Hall, Taipei

16 July
13:00

Report

| Japan U24 | 70–79 | Iraq |
Scoring by quarter: 17–18, 14–22, 19–16, 20–23
| Pts: Hara 16; Rebs: Ikuhara 6 Asts: Hara 3 | | Pts: Mayfield 22; Rebs: Al-Khafaji 11; Asts: Mayfield 3 |

Taipei Peace International Basketball Hall, Taipei

16 July
15:00

Report

| Atletas All-Star Lithuania | 99–102 | Team Canada 150 |
Scoring by quarter: 34–24, 21–19, 16–30, 28–29
| Pts: D. Šeškus 22; Rebs: Žukauskas 7 Asts: D. Šeškus, E. Šeškus 3 | | Pts: Wood 18; Rebs: Smith 8 Asts: Sutherland, Williamson 5 |

Taipei Peace International Basketball Hall, Taipei

16 July
17:00

Report

| Chinese Taipei White | 59–77 | Iran |
Scoring by quarter: 20–12, 15–18, 6–26, 18–21
| Pts: Chen Ying-chun 14; Rebs: Barone 19; Asts: Chen Ying-chun 3 | | Pts: Rezaeifar 21; Rebs: Reaei 12; Asts: Rezaeifar 5 |

Taipei Peace International Basketball Hall, Taipei

16 July
19:00

Report

| Philippines | 88–72 | Chinese Taipei Blue |
Scoring by quarter: 23–22, 24–18, 20–21, 21–11
| Pts: Standhardinger, Wright 17; Rebs: Standhardinger 15; Asts: Ravena 4 | | Pts: Lu Zheng-ru 16; Rebs: Chou Po-hsun 10; Asts: Liu Cheng 4 |

Taipei Peace International Basketball Hall, Taipei

==== Day 3 ====
17 July
11:00

Report

| Atletas All-Star Lithuania | 94–67 | Japan U24 |
Scoring by quarter: 25–12, 27–27, 17–18, 25–10
| Pts: Žukauskas 24; Rebs: Linkevičius 7 Asts: D. Šeškus, Vingelis 5 | | Pts: Hara 21; Rebs: Ando, Sato 6 Asts: Tawatari 3 |

Taipei Peace International Basketball Hall, Taipei

17 July
13:00

Report

| Iraq | 48–99 | Team Canada 150 |
Scoring by quarter: 17–18, 11–33, 11–26, 9–22
| Pts: Mayfield 14; Rebs: Hameed 15; Asts: Hameed, Mayfield 2 | | Pts: Wood 25; Rebs: Kyser 11; Asts: Haywood 5 |

Taipei Peace International Basketball Hall, Taipei

17 July
15:00

Report

| Philippines | 93–82 | Chinese Taipei White |
Scoring by quarter: 18–20, 26–24, 25–18, 24–20
| Pts: Wright 21; Rebs: Myers 14; Asts: Ravena 7 | | Pts: Chen Ying-chun 17; Rebs: Barone 12; Asts: Chen Ying-chun 5 |

Taipei Peace International Basketball Hall, Taipei

17 July
17:00

Report

| Iran | 78–88 | South Korea |
Scoring by quarter: 13–24, 16–20, 30–16, 19–28
| Pts: Reaei 20; Rebs: Reaei 16; Asts: Falahat, Mohammadi 3 | | Pts: Lee Jung-hyun, Kim Sun-hyung 16; Rebs: Oh Se-keun 6 Asts: Lee Jung-hyun 9 |

Taipei Peace International Basketball Hall, Taipei

17 July
19:00

Report

| Chinese Taipei Blue | 101–80 | India |
Scoring by quarter: 25–15, 14–19, 35–20, 27–26
| Pts: Lu Zheng-ru 17; Rebs: Liu Cheng, Wu Dai-hao 6 Asts: Liu Cheng 5 | | Pts: Bukankere Krishne Gowda 27; Rebs: Pethani 7 Asts: Ambati, Sivakumar 4 |

Taipei Peace International Basketball Hall, Taipei

==== Day 4 ====
18 July
11:00

Report

| Chinese Taipei White | 87–79 | Iraq |
Scoring by quarter: 29–22, 19–23, 15–17, 24–17
| Pts: Huang Tsung-han 22; Rebs: Barone 15; Asts: Huang Hung-han 7 | | Pts: Hamad 18; Rebs: Hameed 14; Asts: Aljuboori 3 |

Taipei Peace International Basketball Hall, Taipei

18 July
13:00

Report

| Japan U24 | 85–100 | Philippines |
Scoring by quarter: 16–19, 26–22, 24–25, 19–34
| Pts: Sugiura 22; Rebs: Ando 7 Asts: Hara 4 | | Pts: Standhardinger 22; Rebs: Myers 17; Asts: Ravena, Wright 4 |

Taipei Peace International Basketball Hall, Taipei

18 July
15:00

Report

| India | 44–88 | Iran |
Scoring by quarter: 8–14, 12–23, 14–22, 10–29
| Pts: Sivakumar 12; Rebs: Sivakumar 6 Asts: Am. Singh 5 | | Pts: Khajehzadeh 21; Rebs: Pazrofteh 13; Asts: Mohammadi 7 |

Taipei Peace International Basketball Hall, Taipei

18 July
17:00

Report

| South Korea | 80–95 | Atletas All-Star Lithuania |
Scoring by quarter: 25–28, 13–24, 15–25, 27–18
| Pts: Jeon Jun-beon 22; Rebs: Lee Seung-hyun 5 Asts: Lee Seung-hyun 5 | | Pts: Beniušis 24; Rebs: Beniušis 11; Asts: D. Šeškus 5 |

Taipei Peace International Basketball Hall, Taipei

18 July
19:00

Report

| Team Canada 150 | 86–89 | Chinese Taipei Blue |
Scoring by quarter: 17–21, 23–21, 24–27, 22–20
| Pts: Williamson 15; Rebs: Smith 11; Asts: Keith 4 | | Pts: Liu Cheng 22; Rebs: Chou Po-hsun 6 Asts: Su Yi-jie 5 |

Taipei Peace International Basketball Hall, Taipei

==== Day 5 ====
19 July
11:00

Report

| Atletas All-Star Lithuania | 102–79 | India |
Scoring by quarter: 17–26, 32–17, 24–14, 29–22
| Pts: Jocys 21; Rebs: three players 6 each Asts: Apsitis, D. Šeškus 6 | | Pts: Am. Singh 28; Rebs: Hafeez 10; Asts: Hafeez 6 |

Taipei Peace International Basketball Hall, Taipei

19 July
13:00

Report

| Chinese Taipei White | 86–91 | Japan U24 |
Scoring by quarter: 25–25, 23–22, 15–20, 23–24
| Pts: Chen Guan-quan 18; Rebs: Chen Ying-chun 10; Asts: Chen Ying-chun 5 | | Pts: Hara 26; Rebs: Hara, Hiraiwa 5 Asts: Vendrame 7 |

Taipei Peace International Basketball Hall, Taipei

19 July
15:00

Report

| Iran | 71–105 | Team Canada 150 |
Scoring by quarter: 17–25, 23–25, 16–29, 15–26
| Pts: Khajehzadeh 16; Rebs: Soleymani 12; Asts: Mozafarivanani 3 | | Pts: Kapelan 29; Rebs: Kyser 10; Asts: Kapelan 8 |

Taipei Peace International Basketball Hall, Taipei

19 July
17:00

Report

| Philippines | 72–83 | South Korea |
Scoring by quarter: 16–20, 21–22, 14–24, 21–17
| Pts: Jalalon 18; Rebs: Myers 17; Asts: Ravena 5 | | Pts: Lee Jung-hyun, Oh Se-keun 14; Rebs: Kim Sun-hyung 7 Asts: Heo Hoon 4 |

Taipei Peace International Basketball Hall, Taipei

19 July
19:00

Report

| Chinese Taipei Blue | 76–80 | Iraq |
Scoring by quarter: 24–22, 8–22, 23–14, 21–22
| Pts: Hu Long-mao, Yu Huan-ya 16; Rebs: Su Yi-jie, Tseng Wen-ting 4 Asts: Tseng Wen-ting 6 | | Pts: Mayfield 28; Rebs: Mayfield 11; Asts: Mayfield 8 |

Taipei Peace International Basketball Hall, Taipei

==== Day 6 ====
20 July
11:00

Report

| Japan U24 | 78–87 | Iran |
Scoring by quarter: 18–22, 19–16, 21–22, 20–27
| Pts: Hiraiwa 20; Rebs: Hiraiwa 5 Asts: Tawatari 4 | | Pts: Rezaeifar 39; Rebs: Beigiharchegani, Pazrofteh 6 Asts: four players 2 each |

Taipei Peace International Basketball Hall, Taipei

20 July
13:00

Report

| South Korea | 72–98 | Team Canada 150 |
Scoring by quarter: 24–30, 16–25, 19–18, 13–25
| Pts: Lim Dong-seob 12; Rebs: Kim Jong-kyu 5 Asts: Lee Jung-hyun 4 | | Pts: Kapelan, Wood 18; Rebs: Smith 11; Asts: three players 3 each |

Taipei Peace International Basketball Hall, Taipei

20 July
15:00

Report

| India | 87–117 | Chinese Taipei White |
Scoring by quarter: 15–30, 31–36, 21–24, 20–27
| Pts: Am. Singh 22; Rebs: Pandi, Am. Singh 6 Asts: Bukankere Krishne Gowda 5 | | Pts: Barone 18; Rebs: Barone 9 Asts: Chen Ying-chun 7 |

Taipei Peace International Basketball Hall, Taipei

20 July
17:00

Report

| Iraq | 75–84 | Philippines |
Scoring by quarter: 19–15, 3–21, 27–27, 26–21
| Pts: Mayfield 29; Rebs: Al-Hchaimi 10; Asts: Mayfield 4 | | Pts: Myers 16; Rebs: Myers 18; Asts: Ravena 6 |

Taipei Peace International Basketball Hall, Taipei

20 July
19:00

Report

| Atletas All-Star Lithuania | 85–65 | Chinese Taipei Blue |
Scoring by quarter: 26–20, 19–17, 22–10, 18–18
| Pts: Žukauskas 15; Rebs: Linkevičius 9 Asts: E. Šeškus 6 | | Pts: Chou Yi-hsiang 17; Rebs: Chang Yu-an, Wu Hung-hsing 5 Asts: three players 2 each |

Taipei Peace International Basketball Hall, Taipei

==== Day 7 ====
21 July
11:00

Report

| Team Canada 150 | 121–72 | India |
Scoring by quarter: 33–19, 30–19, 23–21, 35–13
| Pts: Kapelan 21; Rebs: Kyser 15; Asts: Friesen, Kyser 6 | | Pts: Sivakumar 15; Rebs: G. Singh 5 Asts: three players 3 each |

Taipei Peace International Basketball Hall, Taipei

21 July
13:00

Report

| South Korea | 101–81 | Japan U24 |
Scoring by quarter: 31–16, 22–24, 25–19, 23–22
| Pts: Kim Jong-kyu 21; Rebs: Lee Jong-hyun 5 Asts: Jeon Jun-beon, Kim Sun-hyung 4 | | Pts: Ando 12; Rebs: Nomoto 7 Asts: Saito 6 |

Taipei Peace International Basketball Hall, Taipei

21 July
15:00

Report

| Philippines | 80–91 | Atletas All-Star Lithuania |
Scoring by quarter: 22–17, 19–33, 18–22, 21–19
| Pts: Myers, Ravena 14; Rebs: Myers 7 Asts: Ravena 5 | | Pts: Žukauskas 22; Rebs: Beniušis 7 Asts: Žukauskas 7 |

Taipei Peace International Basketball Hall, Taipei

21 July
17:00

Report

| Iran | 75–90 | Iraq |
Scoring by quarter: 18–31, 29–19, 16–19, 12–21
| Pts: Reaei, Rezaeifar 18; Rebs: Soleymani 8 Asts: Mozafarivanani 5 | | Pts: Abdullah 26; Rebs: Mayfield 11; Asts: Aljuboori 6 |

Taipei Peace International Basketball Hall, Taipei

21 July
19:00

Report

| Chinese Taipei Blue | 87–83 (OT) | Chinese Taipei White |
Scoring by quarter: 16–9, 27–26, 15–25, 19–17, Overtime: 10–6
| Pts: Chou Yi-hsiang 21; Rebs: Chou Po-hsun 10; Asts: Tseng Wen-ting 5 | | Pts: Chen Ying-chun 31; Rebs: Barone 16; Asts: three players 2 each |

Taipei Peace International Basketball Hall, Taipei

==== Day 8 ====
22 July
11:00

Report

| Japan U24 | 60–108 | Team Canada 150 |
Scoring by quarter: 17–23, 9–23, 7–29, 27–33
| Pts: Tawatari 12; Rebs: Nnanna, Sato 5 Asts: Sato, Tawatari 3 | | Pts: Bachynski 19; Rebs: Kyser 13; Asts: Haywood 4 |

Taipei Peace International Basketball Hall, Taipei

22 July
13:00

Report

| India | 70–101 | Philippines |
Scoring by quarter: 24–27, 7–27, 24–26, 15–21
| Pts: Am. Singh 25; Rebs: Pandi 10; Asts: Bukankere Krishne Gowda 2 | | Pts: Wright 19; Rebs: Myers 7 Asts: Jalalon 5 |

Taipei Peace International Basketball Hall, Taipei

22 July
15:00

Report

| Chinese Taipei White | 73–85 | Atletas All-Star Lithuania |
Scoring by quarter: 24–19, 13–15, 23–28, 13–23
| Pts: Barone 28; Rebs: Barone 12; Asts: Huang Hung-han, Su Yi-jin 4 | | Pts: E. Šeškus 16; Rebs: Beniušis 13; Asts: E. Šeškus, Žukauskas 7 |

Taipei Peace International Basketball Hall, Taipei

22 July
17:00

Report

| Iraq | 77–93 | South Korea |
Scoring by quarter: 11–23, 16–21, 21–28, 29–21
| Pts: Mayfield 18; Rebs: Hameed 9 Asts: Mayfield 4 | | Pts: Lim Dong-seob 18; Rebs: Choi Jun-yong 8 Asts: Lee Jung-hyun 6 |

Taipei Peace International Basketball Hall, Taipei

22 July
19:00

Report

| Iran | 70–66 | Chinese Taipei Blue |
Scoring by quarter: 12–13, 17–15, 20–25, 21–13
| Pts: Rezaeifar 22; Rebs: Pazrofteh, Reaei 8 Asts: Rezaeifar 5 | | Pts: Liu Cheng 16; Rebs: Chang Yu-an 4 Asts: Chou Po-hsun 2 |

Taipei Peace International Basketball Hall, Taipei

==== Day 9 ====
23 July
11:00

Report

| Atletas All-Star Lithuania | 99–83 | Iraq |
Scoring by quarter: 35–23, 24–25, 14–18, 26–17
| Pts: E. Šeškus 50; Rebs: Linkevičius 12; Asts: Žukauskas 8 | | Pts: Abdullah 25; Rebs: Aljuboori, Mayfield 5 Asts: Mayfield 6 |

Taipei Peace International Basketball Hall, Taipei

23 July
13:00

Report

| Team Canada 150 | 117–83 | Chinese Taipei White |
Scoring by quarter: 23–17, 28–27, 35–22, 31–17
| Pts: Wood 24; Rebs: Kyser 15; Asts: Williamson 8 | | Pts: Chen Ying-chun 30; Rebs: Barone 7 Asts: Huang Hung-han 3 |

Taipei Peace International Basketball Hall, Taipei

23 July
15:00

Report

| India | 61–77 | Japan U24 |
Scoring by quarter: 11–15, 19–13, 15–28, 16–21
| Pts: Am. Singh 22; Rebs: Bukankere Krishne Gowda, Pandi 8 Asts: Hafeez 3 | | Pts: Hara 15; Rebs: Sugiura 8 Asts: Vendrame 5 |

Taipei Peace International Basketball Hall, Taipei

23 July
17:00

Report

| Philippines | 90–82 | Iran |
Scoring by quarter: 26–22, 24–20, 20–20, 20–20
| Pts: Myers 21; Rebs: Myers 21; Asts: Pogoy, Ravena 3 | | Pts: Pazrofteh, Soleymani 21; Rebs: Pazrofteh 14; Asts: Falahat 6 |

Taipei Peace International Basketball Hall, Taipei

23 July
19:00

Report

| Chinese Taipei Blue | 87–85 | South Korea |
Scoring by quarter: 19–22, 28–16, 13–25, 27–22
| Pts: Chou Yi-hsiang 29; Rebs: Chou Yu-an 9 Asts: Tseng Wen-ting 5 | | Pts: Kim Jong-kyu 18; Rebs: Kim Jong-kyu, Lee Seung-hyun 5 Asts: Choi Jun-yong 5 |

Taipei Peace International Basketball Hall, Taipei

== Women's tournament ==
=== Participating teams ===
- Chinese Taipei Blue
- Chinese Taipei White
- India
- Japan U24
- (South Korea) Korea KB All Stars
- New Zealand

=== Team standings ===
| Team | Pld | W | L | PF | PA | PD | Pts | Tie |
|---|---|---|---|---|---|---|---|---|
| Japan U24 | 5 | 4 | 1 | 401 | 318 | +83 | 9 | 1–1; 1.07 |
| Chinese Taipei Blue | 5 | 4 | 1 | 410 | 326 | +84 | 9 | 1–1; 1.04 |
| New Zealand | 5 | 4 | 1 | 336 | 308 | +28 | 9 | 1–1; 0.89 |
| Chinese Taipei White | 5 | 2 | 3 | 350 | 328 | +22 | 7 | N/A |
| (South Korea) Korea KB All Stars | 5 | 1 | 4 | 278 | 324 | −46 | 6 | N/A |
| India | 5 | 0 | 5 | 245 | 416 | −171 | 5 | N/A |

==== Day 1 ====
5 July
14:00

Report

| India | 52–75 | New Zealand |
Scoring by quarter: 15–24, 11–18, 9–13, 17–20
| Pts: Durai 15; Rebs: Rajaganapathi 8 Asts: three players 3 each | | Pts: Cocks 21; Rebs: Purcell 10; Asts: Harmon 6 |

Changhua City Stadium, Changhua

5 July
16:00

Report

| Korea KB All Stars (South Korea) | 63–70 | Chinese Taipei White |
Scoring by quarter: 15–13, 10–19, 19–24, 19–14
| Pts: Park Ji-eun 14; Rebs: Kim Han-bi, Kim Jin-yeong 8 Asts: Kim Hyeon-a 4 | | Pts: Lo Pin 17; Rebs: Wang Wei-lin 8 Asts: Huang Yu-ting 6 |

Changhua City Stadium, Changhua

5 July
18:30

Report

| Chinese Taipei Blue | 70–83 | Japan U24 |
Scoring by quarter: 19–23, 13–28, 16–15, 22–17
| Pts: Lin Yu-ting 25; Rebs: Lin Yu-ting 13; Asts: Lin Xian-fang, Zheng Yi-xiu 2 | | Pts: Saki 14; Rebs: Nakada 11; Asts: Yasuma 4 |

Changhua City Stadium, Changhua

==== Day 2 ====
6 July
14:00

Report

| Japan U24 | 93–42 | India |
Scoring by quarter: 36–13, 20–7, 12–8, 25–14
| Pts: Saki 17; Rebs: Murayama 10; Asts: Yasuma 8 | | Pts: Sidhu 9 Rebs: Geetha 6 Asts: Limaye 3 |

Changhua City Stadium, Changhua

6 July
16:00

Report

| New Zealand | 58–40 | (South Korea) Korea KB All Stars |
Scoring by quarter: 20–8, 6–16, 17–8, 15–8
| Pts: Edmondson 16; Rebs: Purcell 12; Asts: Purcell 3 | | Pts: Kim Hee-jin 9 Rebs: Park Ji-eun 6 Asts: three players 2 each |

Changhua City Stadium, Changhua

6 July
18:00

Report

| Chinese Taipei White | 68–81 | Chinese Taipei Blue |
Scoring by quarter: 17–12, 14–25, 25–22, 12–22
| Pts: Wang Wei-lin 17; Rebs: Chen Wei-an 7 Asts: Chu Yu-chin 7 | | Pts: Lin Yu-ting 20; Rebs: Lin Ji-wen 12; Asts: Lin Yu-ting 6 |

Changhua City Stadium, Changhua

==== Day 3 ====
7 July
14:00

Report

| Korea KB All Stars (South Korea) | 56–51 | India |
Scoring by quarter: 17–13, 11–10, 19–14, 9–14
| Pts: Kim Hyeon-a 16; Rebs: Kim Hyeon-a 7 Asts: Kim Bo-mi 4 | | Pts: Skaria 9 Rebs: Skaria 13; Asts: Durai, Limaye 2 |

Changhua City Stadium, Changhua

7 July
16:00

Report

| Chinese Taipei White | 68–75 | Japan U24 |
Scoring by quarter: 9–20, 21–17, 23–16, 15–22
| Pts: Chen Wei-an, Huang Lin-chuan 16; Rebs: Chen Wei-an 7 Asts: Chu Yu-chin 3 | | Pts: Saki 19; Rebs: Saki 7 Asts: Yasuma 10 |

Changhua City Stadium, Changhua

7 July
18:00

Report

| Chinese Taipei Blue | 79–60 | New Zealand |
Scoring by quarter: 25–13, 21–11, 11–23, 22–13
| Pts: Lin Yu-ting 28; Rebs: Wu Ying-jie 6 Asts: three players 4 each | | Pts: Purcell 18; Rebs: Purcell 12; Asts: Edmondson 3 |

Changhua City Stadium, Changhua

==== Day 4 ====
8 July
14:00

Report

| New Zealand | 68–65 | Chinese Taipei White |
Scoring by quarter: 23–10, 7–21, 21–20, 17–14
| Pts: Stockill 22; Rebs: Purcell 11; Asts: Edmondson 4 | | Pts: Wang Wei-lin 22; Rebs: Hsu Yu-lien, Wang Wei-lin 5 Asts: Chu Yu-chin 7 |

Changhua City Stadium, Changhua

8 July
16:00

Report

| Japan U24 | 78–63 | (South Korea) Korea KB All Stars |
Scoring by quarter: 25–15, 18–16, 20–18, 15–14
| Pts: Nakada 14; Rebs: Nakada 13; Asts: Yasuma 3 | | Pts: Kim Hyeon-a, Kim Jin-yeong 15; Rebs: Kim Bo-mi 8 Asts: Kin Han-bi 4 |

Changhua City Stadium, Changhua

8 July
18:00

Report

| India | 59–113 | Chinese Taipei Blue |
Scoring by quarter: 9–31, 13–23, 22–25, 15–34
| Pts: Skaria 15; Rebs: Skaria 8 Asts: three players 2 each | | Pts: Wu Ying-jie 28; Rebs: Zheng Yi-xiu 6 Asts: three players 5 each |

Changhua City Stadium, Changhua

==== Day 5 ====
9 July
14:00

Report

| Japan U24 | 72–75 | New Zealand |
Scoring by quarter: 19–18, 18–19, 15–24, 20–14
| Pts: Saki 21; Rebs: three players 5 each Asts: Yasuma 12 | | Pts: Cocks 27; Rebs: Edmondson, Ott 7 Asts: Edmondson 3 |

Changhua City Stadium, Changhua

9 July
16:00

Report

| Chinese Taipei White | 79–41 | India |
Scoring by quarter: 24–13, 22–11, 20–3, 13–14
| Pts: Peng Hsiao-tung 14; Rebs: Shih Ching-ju 8 Asts: Huang Yu-ting 6 | | Pts: Akula 13; Rebs: Geetha 10; Asts: Durai 4 |

Changhua City Stadium, Changhua

9 July
18:00

Report

| Chinese Taipei | 67–56 | (South Korea) Korea KB All Stars |
Scoring by quarter: 12–10, 16–18, 20–14, 19–14
| Pts: Zheng Yi-xiu 19; Rebs: Zheng Yi-xiu 11; Asts: Lin Yu-ting 7 | | Pts: Kim Ga-eun 19; Rebs: Park Ji-eun 12; Asts: Kim Jin-yeong 3 |

Changhua City Stadium, Changhua

== Awards ==
=== Men's tournament ===
2017 William Jones Cup

=== Women's tournament ===
2017 William Jones Cup
