= Šeškus =

- Lithuanian surname
- m.: Šeškus
- f.: (unmarried): Šeškaitė
- f.: (married): Šeškienė

Šeškus is a Lithuanian surname. 'Šeškas' literally means 'ferret'.

- Domantas Šeškus
- Edvinas Šeškus
- Virginijus Šeškus

== See also ==
- Šeškės
