= Basketball at the 2022 Asian Games – Men's tournament =

Asian Games event

Men at the 2022 Asian Games
- Venues: Hangzhou Olympic Expo Center Gymnasium; Zijingang Campus Gymnasium
- Dates: 26 September – 6 October 2023
- Competitors: 192 from 16 nations

Medalists
gold medal	Philippines
silver medal	Jordan
bronze medal	China

The men's 5-on-5 basketball tournament at the 2022 Asian Games was held in Hangzhou, China from 26 September to 6 October 2023.

On 12 October 2023, the International Testing Agency announced that Jordan's Sami Bzai and the Philippines' Justin Brownlee both tested positive for substances prohibited by the World Anti-Doping Agency. On its website, the Olympic Council of Asia and the ITA confirmed that no results would be disqualified since all the other players from both rosters have been cleared.

== Squads ==
Bahrain	China	Chinese Taipei	Hong Kong
Mohamed Buallay; Wayne Chism; Ali Husain Rashed; Maitham Jameel; Sayed Mohamed Kadhem; Mustafa Husain Rashed; Ali Aqeel Melad; Ali Jaber Al-Haddad; Mohammed Hamoda; Muzamil Hamoda; Ali Hasan Shukralla; Al-Watheq Al-Hassan	Hu Mingxuan; Zhao Jiwei; Cheng Shuaipeng; Zhao Rui; Fu Hao; Yu Jiahao; Du Runwang; Cui Yongxi; Hu Jinqiu; Zhu Junlong; Wang Zhelin; Zhang Zhenlin	Lin Ting-chien; Bachir Gadiaga; Liu Cheng; Hsieh Ya-hsuan; Wu Yung-cheng; Chou Po-hsun; Tseng Hsiang-chun; Lee Te-wei; Will Artino; Lu Chun-hsiang; Lee Chi-wei; Tseng Wen-ting	Leung Shiu Wah; Lee Ki; Chan Siu Wing; Ricky Yang; Pok Yuet Yeung; Tang Chi Hang; Adam Xu; Marco Leung; Oliver Xu; Tsai Choi Kwan; Duncan Reid; Yip Yiu Pong
Indonesia	Iran	Japan	Jordan
Juan Laurent; Hendrick Xavi Yonga; Yesaya Saudale; Anthony Beane; Yudha Saputera; Muhamad Arighi; Vincent Rivaldi Kosasih; Kelvin Sanjaya; Karl Gloria; Kaleb Ramot Gemilang; Aldy Izzatur Rachman; Widyanta Putra Teja	Mohammad Shahrian; Sina Vahedi; Meisam Mirzaei; Sajjad Mashayekhi; Navid Rezaeifar; Peter Grigorian; Amir Ali Gholizadeh; Arsalan Kazemi; Matin Aghajanpour; Mohammad Torabi; Sajjad Pazirofteh; Hassan Aliakbari	Ryo Terashima; Takumi Saito; Raita Akaho; Ko Kumagai; Yo Nishino; Takuma Sato; Masato Ichikawa; Gen Hiraiwa; Yuto Kawashima; Kazuki Hosokawa; Keita Imamura; Java Yoneyama	Fadi Qarmash; Freddy Ibrahim; Ashraf Al-Hendi; Ahmad Al-Hamarsheh; Sami Bzai; Ahmad Hammouri; Mohammad Hussein; Hashem Abbas; Malek Kanaan; Rondae Hollis-Jefferson; John Bohannon; Ahmad Al-Dwairi
Kazakhstan	Mongolia	Philippines	Qatar
Shaim Kuanov; Konstantin Neff; Vladimir Ivanov; Vadim Chsherbak; Rustam Murzagaliyev; Anton Bykov; Roman Marchuk; Robert Pan; Dmitriy Gavrilov; Stanislav Sakhipov; Adilkhan Marat; Ruslan Aitkali	Gantsolmongiin Bolor-Erdene; Amarbayasgalangiin Enkhbayasgalan; Tümenbayaryn Uuganbayar; Sandagdorjiin Binderiyaa; Bataagiin Tului; Odgereliin Tulga; Khishigbaataryn Orgil; Enkhbaataryn Mönkhbayar; Davaadorjiin Dölgöönmörön; Gantulgyn Tselmeg; Gantsolmongiin Gan-Erdene; Altangereliin Azbayar	Chris Newsome; Kevin Alas; Scottie Thompson; Arvin Tolentino; Chris Ross; Marcio Lassiter; June Mar Fajardo; CJ Perez; Calvin Oftana; Japeth Aguilar; Justin Brownlee; Ange Kouame	Momar Gueye; Mahmoud Darwish; Seydou Ndoye; Nedim Muslić; Abdullah Mousa; Ghassan Hajar; Meho Haračić; Babacar Dieng; Mohamed Ndao; Khaled Abdelbaset; Faris Avdić; Moustafa Lashin
Saudi Arabia	South Korea	Thailand	United Arab Emirates
Mohammed Al-Marwani; Marzouq Al-Muwallad; Mathna Al-Marwani; Fahad Belal; Mohammed Saleh; Khalid Abdel-Gabar; Mohammed Al-Suwailem; Nassir Abojalas; Ali Al-Shubayli; Abdulrahman Fallatah; Thamer Mohammed; Musab Kadi	Ha Yun-gi; Lee Jung-hyun; Heo Hoon; Byeon Jun-hyeong; Kim Sun-hyung; Lee Woo-suk; Yang Hong-seok; Moon Jeong-hyeon; Kim Jong-kyu; Ra Gun-ah; Jeon Seong-hyen; Lee Seoung-hyun	Tyler Lamb; Freddie Lish; Moses Morgan; Jittaphon Towaroj; Jakongmee Morgan; Naratip Boonserm; Nakorn Jaisanuk; Manatsawee Booddoung; Anasawee Klaewnarong; Nattakarn Muangboon; Chanatip Jakrawan; Patiphan Klahan	Rashed Ayman Mohammed; Hamid Al-Breiki; Rashed Al-Nuaimi; Faisal Mohammed; Omar Al-Ameri; Rashed Al-Zaabi; Jasim Al-Maazmi; Khalid Khalifa Ahmad; Qais Al-Shabebi; Mahmoud Al-Sawan; Hazaea Al-Shabebi; Abdulaziz Khalifa Ahmad

== Results ==
All times are China Standard Time (UTC+08:00)

=== Preliminary round ===
==== Group A ====
Pos	Team	Pld	W	L	PF	PA	PD	Pts	Qualification
1	Iran	3	3	0	248	183	+65	6	Quarterfinals
2	Saudi Arabia	3	2	1	226	210	+16	5	Qualification for quarterfinals
3	Kazakhstan	3	1	2	181	221	−40	4	Qualification for quarterfinals
4	United Arab Emirates	3	0	3	173	214	−41	3	

Source: OCA

26 September
11:00

Report

Iran	81–57	United Arab Emirates
Scoring by quarter: 23–24, 18–20, 22–9, 18–4
Pts: Rezaeifar 19; Rebs: Mirzaei 11; Asts: Rezaeifar 4		Pts: Q. Al-Shabebi 23; Rebs: Q. Al-Shabebi 9 Asts: R. Mohammed, Al-Zaabi 3

Olympic Expo Center Gymnasium, Hangzhou
Referees: Yuen Chun Yip (HKG), Preeda Muongmee (THA), Totie Celeste (PHI)

26 September
11:00

Report

Kazakhstan	62–86	Saudi Arabia
Scoring by quarter: 13–20, 15–21, 17–25, 17–20
Pts: Murzagaliyev 10; Rebs: Murzagaliyev, Gavrilov 3 Asts: Kuanov 6		Pts: Al-Muwallad 18; Rebs: Al-Suwailem 10; Asts: Abdel-Gabar 6

Zijingang Campus Gymnasium, Hangzhou
Referees: Harja Jaladri (INA), Kim Bo-hui (KOR), Huang Yun-hsuan (TPE)

28 September
17:30

Report

Saudi Arabia	66–81	Iran
Scoring by quarter: 11–21, 17–17, 10–23, 28–20
Pts: Abdel-Gabar 15; Rebs: Al-Suwailem 11; Asts: Al-Muwallad, Abdel-Gabar 5		Pts: Mirzaei 17; Rebs: Mirzaei 9 Asts: Kazemi 6

Olympic Expo Center Gymnasium, Hangzhou
Referees: Preeda Muongmee (THA), Cheon Kam-jae (KOR), Haryanto Sutaryo (INA)

28 September
17:30

Report

United Arab Emirates	49–59	Kazakhstan
Scoring by quarter: 14–16, 14–14, 15–14, 6–15
Pts: Q. Al-Shabebi 14; Rebs: Al-Ameri 9 Asts: Al-Breiki, Al-Ameri 2		Pts: Marchuk 14; Rebs: Bykov, Pan 10; Asts: Kuanov 8

Zijingang Campus Gymnasium, Hangzhou
Referees: Harja Jaladri (INA), Kim Bo-hui (KOR), Totie Celeste (PHI)

30 September
13:30

Report

Iran	86–60	Kazakhstan
Scoring by quarter: 20–16, 15–9, 30–19, 21–16
Pts: Rezaeifar 17; Rebs: Mirzaei, Kazemi 8 Asts: Vahedi 4		Pts: Chsherbak 13; Rebs: Pan 8 Asts: Kuanov 6

Olympic Expo Center Gymnasium, Hangzhou
Referees: Wissam Zein (SYR), Haryanto Sutaryo (INA), Anan Daraghma (PLE)

30 September
13:30

Report

Saudi Arabia	74–67	United Arab Emirates
Scoring by quarter: 20–26, 26–16, 14–20, 14–5
Pts: Al-Suwailem 22; Rebs: Al-Suwailem 12; Asts: Al-Suwailem 6		Pts: Al-Zaabi 16; Rebs: Al-Zaabi 7 Asts: Al-Zaabi 5

Zijingang Campus Gymnasium, Hangzhou
Referees: Preeda Muongmee (THA), Ahmad Al-Yousef (JOR), Tee Yong Sern (MAS)

==== Group B ====
Pos	Team	Pld	W	L	PF	PA	PD	Pts	Qualification
1	China	3	3	0	273	169	+104	6	Quarterfinals
2	Chinese Taipei	3	2	1	228	226	+2	5	Qualification for quarterfinals
3	Hong Kong	3	1	2	181	240	−59	4	Qualification for quarterfinals
4	Mongolia	3	0	3	189	236	−47	3	

Source: OCA

26 September
20:00

Report

China	89–50	Mongolia
Scoring by quarter: 20–19, 24–9, 21–12, 24–10
Pts: Zhang 19; Rebs: Zhang 10; Asts: Hu J. 4		Pts: Tulga 8 Rebs: Dölgöönmörön 5 Asts: Bolor-Erdene 6

Olympic Expo Center Gymnasium, Hangzhou
Referees: Yana Nikogossyan (KAZ), Mohammad Rajabi (IRI), Tee Yong Sern (MAS)

26 September
20:00

Report

Hong Kong	62–81	Chinese Taipei
Scoring by quarter: 10–24, 17–20, 18–19, 17–18
Pts: Reid 16; Rebs: Reid 8 Asts: Leung S., Tsai 3		Pts: Liu 18; Rebs: Artino 10; Asts: Lin 7

Zijingang Campus Gymnasium, Hangzhou
Referees: Issam Al-Siyabi (OMA), Bandar Al-Suwaidi (QAT), Cheon Kam-jae (KOR)

28 September
20:00

Report

Chinese Taipei	69–89	China
Scoring by quarter: 12–23, 15–19, 26–28, 16–19
Pts: Artino 21; Rebs: Artino 11; Asts: Lin 7		Pts: Zhao J. 19; Rebs: Zhang 11; Asts: Zhao J. 7

Olympic Expo Center Gymnasium, Hangzhou
Referees: Wissam Zein (SYR), Issam Al-Siyabi (OMA), Anan Daraghma (PLE)

28 September
20:00

Report

Mongolia	64–69	Hong Kong
Scoring by quarter: 20–17, 10–20, 18–17, 16–15
Pts: Bolor-Erdene 22; Rebs: Uuganbayar 8 Asts: Gan-Erdene 5		Pts: Lee 19; Rebs: Reid 13; Asts: Chan 5

Zijingang Campus Gymnasium, Hangzhou
Referees: Mohamed Al-Salam (BRN), Ahmad Al-Yousef (JOR), Bandar Al-Suwaidi (QAT)

30 September
20:00

Report

China	95–50	Hong Kong
Scoring by quarter: 22–10, 23–2, 23–21, 27–17
Pts: Zhao J. 16; Rebs: Yu 9 Asts: Zhao R. 6		Pts: Lee, M. Leung 9 Rebs: A. Xu 5 Asts: O. Xu 3

Olympic Expo Center Gymnasium, Hangzhou
Referees: Harja Jaladri (INA), Cheon Kam-jae (KOR), Totie Celeste (PHI)

30 September
20:00

Report

Chinese Taipei	78–75	Mongolia
Scoring by quarter: 22–19, 21–25, 19–20, 16–11
Pts: Artino 27; Rebs: Liu, Artino 8 Asts: Tseng W. 6		Pts: Enkhbayasgalan 16; Rebs: Dölgöönmörön 9 Asts: Bolor-Erdene 11

Zijingang Campus Gymnasium, Hangzhou
Referees: Mohamed Al-Salam (BRN), Kim Bo-hui (KOR), Bandar Al-Suwaidi (QAT)

==== Group C ====
Pos	Team	Pld	W	L	PF	PA	PD	Pts	Qualification
1	Jordan	3	3	0	268	185	+83	6	Quarterfinals
2	Philippines	3	2	1	238	220	+18	5	Qualification for quarterfinals
3	Bahrain	3	1	2	197	235	−38	4	Qualification for quarterfinals
4	Thailand	3	0	3	197	260	−63	3	

Source: OCA

26 September
13:30

Report

Philippines	89–61	Bahrain
Scoring by quarter: 22–18, 29–15, 21–14, 17–14
Pts: Perez, Kouame 15; Rebs: Brownlee 10; Asts: Lassiter 4		Pts: Jameel 14; Rebs: Chism 13; Asts: Jameel 3

Olympic Expo Center Gymnasium, Hangzhou
Referees: Paul Skayem (LBN), Taha Al-Hashedi (YEM), Li Chengxin (CHN)

26 September
13:30

Report

Jordan	97–63	Thailand
Scoring by quarter: 28–18, 14–9, 31–17, 24–19
Pts: Bzai 26; Rebs: Bohannon, Al-Dwairi 12; Asts: Bohannon 5		Pts: Lish 13; Rebs: J. Morgan, Jakrawan 6 Asts: Lish 5

Zijingang Campus Gymnasium, Hangzhou
Referees: Alexey Stepanenko (KAZ), Haryanto Sutaryo (INA), Ahmed Al-Khamees (KSA)

28 September
11:00

Report

Bahrain	60–84	Jordan
Scoring by quarter: 8–28, 18–17, 17–22, 17–17
Pts: M. Rashed 16; Rebs: Chism, Mo. Hamoda 9 Asts: M. Rashed 4		Pts: Hollis-Jefferson, Al-Dwairi 17; Rebs: Al-Dwairi 13; Asts: Al-Dwairi 7

Olympic Expo Center Gymnasium, Hangzhou
Referees: Alexey Stepanenko (KAZ), Taha Al-Hashedi (YEM), Yu Yijing (CHN)

28 September
11:00

Report

Thailand	72–87	Philippines
Scoring by quarter: 22–20, 13–21, 15–27, 22–19
Pts: Lamb 29; Rebs: Jakrawan, Klahan 6 Asts: Lish, J. Morgan 3		Pts: Brownlee 22; Rebs: Brownlee 15; Asts: Thompson 9

Zijingang Campus Gymnasium, Hangzhou
Referees: Yuen Chun Yip (HKG), Hu Jing (CHN), Mohammad Rajabi (IRI)

30 September
17:30

Report

Jordan	87–62	Philippines
Scoring by quarter: 16–13, 26–16, 17–23, 28–10
Pts: Hollis-Jefferson 24; Rebs: Bohannon 9 Asts: Hollis-Jefferson 9		Pts: Brownlee 24; Rebs: Thompson 11; Asts: Brownlee, Perez 3

Olympic Expo Center Gymnasium, Hangzhou
Referees: Yuen Chun Yip (HKG), Song Houlu (CHN), Issam Al-Siyabi (OMA)

30 September
17:30

Report

Bahrain	76–62	Thailand
Scoring by quarter: 17–12, 14–22, 20–14, 25–14
Pts: Chism 25; Rebs: Chism 15; Asts: Buallay 4		Pts: Lamb 18; Rebs: Klahan 8 Asts: Lish, J. Morgan 4

Zijingang Campus Gymnasium, Hangzhou
Referees: Alexey Stepanenko (KAZ), Huang Yun-hsuan (TPE), Li Chengxin (CHN)

==== Group D ====
Pos	Team	Pld	W	L	PF	PA	PD	Pts	Qualification
1	Japan	3	3	0	248	197	+51	6	Quarterfinals
2	South Korea	3	2	1	248	202	+46	5	Qualification for quarterfinals
3	Qatar	3	1	2	201	238	−37	4	Qualification for quarterfinals
4	Indonesia	3	0	3	179	239	−60	3	

Source: OCA

26 September
17:30

Report

Japan	95–63	Qatar
Scoring by quarter: 33–13, 23–21, 18–7, 21–22
Pts: Terashima 22; Rebs: Sato 11; Asts: Saito, Kumagai 5		Pts: Ndoye 15; Rebs: Ndoye, Avdić 6 Asts: Avdić 3

Olympic Expo Center Gymnasium, Hangzhou
Referees: Mohamed Al-Salam (BRN), Anan Daraghma (PLE), Song Houlu (CHN)

26 September
17:30

Report

South Korea	95–55	Indonesia
Scoring by quarter: 20–8, 30–23, 22–13, 23–11
Pts: Heo 20; Rebs: Yang 13; Asts: Lee S. 8		Pts: Saputera 15; Rebs: Kosasih 9 Asts: Laurent, Teja 4

Zijingang Campus Gymnasium, Hangzhou
Referees: Wissam Zein (SYR), Yu Yijing (CHN), Ahmad Al-Yousef (JOR)

28 September
13:30

Report

Qatar	64–76	South Korea
Scoring by quarter: 13–22, 16–21, 18–24, 17–9
Pts: Dieng 17; Rebs: Ndoye, Avdić 8 Asts: Dieng 4		Pts: Ra 23; Rebs: Ra 14; Asts: Heo 6

Olympic Expo Center Gymnasium, Hangzhou
Referees: Paul Skayem (LBN), Song Houlu (CHN), Fang Wenxuan (CHN)

28 September
13:30

Report

Indonesia	57–70	Japan
Scoring by quarter: 15–21, 19–17, 16–14, 7–18
Pts: Saputera 12; Rebs: Kosasih 10; Asts: Teja 4		Pts: Hosokawa 17; Rebs: Kawashima 7 Asts: Hosokawa 4

Zijingang Campus Gymnasium, Hangzhou
Referees: Yana Nikogossyan (KAZ), Ahmed Al-Khamees (KSA), Li Chengxin (CHN)

30 September
11:00

Report

Japan	83–77	South Korea
Scoring by quarter: 23–17, 20–20, 18–16, 22–24
Pts: Imamura 22; Rebs: Sato 8 Asts: Saito 7		Pts: Heo 24; Rebs: Ha, Ra 8 Asts: Kim S. 6

Olympic Expo Center Gymnasium, Hangzhou
Referees: Paul Skayem (LBN), Yana Nikogossyan (KAZ), Ahmed Al-Khamees (KSA)

30 September
11:00

Report

Indonesia	67–74	Qatar
Scoring by quarter: 18–14, 19–19, 19–21, 11–20
Pts: Saputera 19; Rebs: Laurent, Sanjaya 6 Asts: Saputera 7		Pts: Ndoye 21; Rebs: Muslić, Avdić 9 Asts: Ndoye, Avdić 4

Zijingang Campus Gymnasium, Hangzhou
Referees: Taha Al-Hashedi (YEM), Hu Jing (CHN), Mohammad Rajabi (IRI)

=== Final round ===
Qualification for quarterfinals
2 October
Saudi Arabia	95
Hong Kong	72
2 October
Chinese Taipei	83
Kazakhstan	62
2 October
Philippines	80
Qatar	41
2 October
South Korea	88
Bahrain	73

Quarterfinals
3 October
Jordan	76
Saudi Arabia	57
3 October
Japan	66
Chinese Taipei	85
3 October
Iran	83
Philippines	84
3 October
China	84
South Korea	70

Semifinals
4 October
Jordan	90
Chinese Taipei	71
4 October
Philippines	77
China	76

Gold medal game
6 October
Jordan	60
Philippines	70
Bronze medal game
6 October
Chinese Taipei	73
China	101

Classification 5th/8th place
4 October
Iran	89
South Korea	82
4 October
Saudi Arabia	79
Japan	74

Rank 5/6
6 October
Iran	92
Saudi Arabia	60
Rank 7/8
6 October
South Korea	74
Japan	55

==== Qualification for quarterfinals ====
2 October
12:00

Report

Saudi Arabia	95–72	Hong Kong
Scoring by quarter: 32–17, 16–11, 29–15, 18–29
Pts: Al-Suwailem 21; Rebs: Al-Suwailem 7 Asts: Belal, Abdel-Gabar 6		Pts: M. Leung, Tsai 15; Rebs: Yip 11; Asts: Yang 8

Zijingang Campus Gymnasium, Hangzhou
Referees: Harja Jaladri (INA), Ahmad Al-Yousef (JOR), Totie Celeste (PHI)

2 October
12:00

Report

Chinese Taipei	83–62	Kazakhstan
Scoring by quarter: 20–11, 24–15, 22–18, 17–18
Pts: Lin 19; Rebs: Artino 11; Asts: Lin 8		Pts: Pan 23; Rebs: Pan 7 Asts: Murzagaliyev 7

Olympic Expo Center Gymnasium, Hangzhou
Referees: Paul Skayem (LBN), Cheon Kam-jae (KOR), Bandar Al-Suwaidi (QAT)

2 October
16:00

Report

Philippines	80–41	Qatar
Scoring by quarter: 33–14, 24–9, 16–7, 7–11
Pts: Fajardo, Perez 12; Rebs: Kouame 10; Asts: Newsome 6		Pts: Muslić 12; Rebs: Ndao 8 Asts: four players 4

Zijingang Campus Gymnasium, Hangzhou
Referees: Wissam Zein (SYR), Hu Jing (CHN), Taha Al-Hashedi (YEM)

2 October
20:00

Report

South Korea	88–73	Bahrain
Scoring by quarter: 24–20, 31–16, 20–15, 13–22
Pts: Ha 16; Rebs: Yang 9 Asts: Kim S., Lee W. 5		Pts: Chism 20; Rebs: Chism 15; Asts: Jameel 6

Zijingang Campus Gymnasium, Hangzhou
Referees: Yuen Chun Yip (HKG), Alexey Stepanenko (KAZ), Mohammad Rajabi (IRI)

==== Quarterfinals ====
3 October
12:00

Report

Iran	83–84	Philippines
Scoring by quarter: 22–28, 14–20, 18–23, 29–13
Pts: Vahedi 24; Rebs: Kazemi 8 Asts: Rezaeifer 7		Pts: Brownlee 36; Rebs: Fajardo, Brownlee 8 Asts: Fajardo, Brownlee 4

Zijingang Campus Gymnasium, Hangzhou
Referees: Alexey Stepanenko (KAZ), Taha Al-Hashedi (YEM), Ahmad Al-Yousef (JOR)

3 October
12:00

Report

China	84–70	South Korea
Scoring by quarter: 20–12, 30–17, 16–15, 18–26
Pts: Du 16; Rebs: Hu J. 7 Asts: Zhao J. 7		Pts: Ra 14; Rebs: Kim J., Ra 7 Asts: Ha, Byeon 2

Olympic Expo Center Gymnasium, Hangzhou
Referees: Harja Jaladri (INA), Issam Al-Siyabi (OMA), Ahmed Al-Khamees (KSA)

3 October
16:00

Report

Jordan	76–57	Saudi Arabia
Scoring by quarter: 25–6, 17–21, 23–9, 11–21
Pts: Al-Dwairi 16; Rebs: Bohannon 14; Asts: Ibrahim, Bzai, Hollis-Jefferson 4		Pts: Al-Suwailem 19; Rebs: Al-Suwailem 10; Asts: Abdel-Gabar 4

Zijingang Campus Gymnasium, Hangzhou
Referees: Paul Skayem (LBN), Cheon Kam-jae (KOR), Mohammad Rajabi (IRI)

3 October
20:00

Report

Japan	66–85	Chinese Taipei
Scoring by quarter: 12–28, 13–15, 18–23, 23–19
Pts: Imamura 15; Rebs: Imamura 5 Asts: Akaho, Kawashima 3		Pts: Lin 28; Rebs: Liu, Artino 10; Asts: Lin 8

Zijingang Campus Gymnasium, Hangzhou
Referees: Wissam Zein (SYR), Kim Bo-hui (KOR), Mohamed Al-Salam (BRN)

==== Classification 5th/8th place ====
4 October
16:00

Report

Iran	89–82	South Korea
Scoring by quarter: 21–20, 19–28, 26–15, 23–19
Pts: Mashayekhi 19; Rebs: Mirzaei 11; Asts: four players 3		Pts: Ra 23; Rebs: Ra 7 Asts: Heo 8

Zijingang Campus Gymnasium, Hangzhou
Referees: Yuen Chun Yip (HKG), Li Chengxin (CHN), Song Houlu (CHN)

4 October
20:00

Report

Saudi Arabia	79–74	Japan
Scoring by quarter: 19–23, 27–13, 19–19, 14–19
Pts: Al-Suwailem 24; Rebs: Al-Suwailem 21; Asts: Abdel-Gabar 4		Pts: Hosokawa, Imamura 14; Rebs: Sato, Kawashima 5 Asts: Saito 7

Zijingang Campus Gymnasium, Hangzhou
Referees: Taha Al-Hashedi (YEM), Cheon Kam-jae (KOR), Totie Celeste (PHI)

==== Semifinals ====
4 October
16:00

Report

Jordan	90–71	Chinese Taipei
Scoring by quarter: 19–16, 26–19, 24–12, 21–24
Pts: Hollis-Jefferson 20; Rebs: Bohannon 15; Asts: Ibrahim 6		Pts: Lin 12; Rebs: Artino 11; Asts: Lin, Liu, Lee 4

Olympic Expo Center Gymnasium, Hangzhou
Referees: Harja Jaladri (INA), Preeda Muongmee (THA), Issam Al-Siyabi (OMA)

4 October
20:00

Report

Philippines	77–76	China
Scoring by quarter: 17–19, 13–29, 20–14, 27–14
Pts: Brownlee 33; Rebs: Thompson 8 Asts: Perez, Brownlee 4		Pts: Zhao R. 18; Rebs: Zhu 8 Asts: Zhao R. 6

Olympic Expo Center Gymnasium, Hangzhou
Referees: Paul Skayem (LBN), Alexey Stepanenko (KAZ), Wissam Zein (SYR)

==== Rank 7/8 ====
6 October
12:00

Report

South Korea	74–55	Japan
Scoring by quarter: 19–18, 22–7, 18–18, 15–12
Pts: Moon 20; Rebs: Ra 11; Asts: Lee J. 8		Pts: Hosokawa, Imamura 15; Rebs: Hosokawa, Yoneyama 6 Asts: Saito, Kumagai 4

Zijingang Campus Gymnasium, Hangzhou
Referees: Preeda Muongmee (IND), Ahmad Al-Yousef (JOR), Ahmed Al-Khamees (KSA)

==== Rank 5/6 ====
6 October
16:00

Report

Iran	92–60	Saudi Arabia
Scoring by quarter: 23–11, 22–23, 31–10, 16–16
Pts: Aghajanpour 17; Rebs: Mirzaei 6 Asts: Grigorian 6		Pts: Ma. Al-Marwani 14; Rebs: Al-Suwailem 8 Asts: Abdel-Gabar, Al-Suwailem 3

Zijingang Campus Gymnasium, Hangzhou
Referees: Song Houlu (CHN), Taha Al-Hashedi (YEM), Li Chengxin (CHN)

==== Bronze medal game ====
6 October
16:00

Report

Chinese Taipei	73–101	China
Scoring by quarter: 29–21, 20–25, 10–34, 14–21
Pts: Lin 20; Rebs: Artino 13; Asts: Gadiaga 5		Pts: Cui 20; Rebs: Hu J. 6 Asts: Zhao J. 8

Olympic Expo Center Gymnasium, Hangzhou
Referees: Alexey Stepanenko (KAZ), Issam Al-Siyabi (OMA), Cheon Kam-jae (KOR)

==== Gold medal game ====
6 October
20:00

Report

Jordan	60–70	Philippines
Scoring by quarter: 12–17, 19–14, 10–20, 19–19
Pts: Hollis-Jefferson 24; Rebs: Al-Dwairi 15; Asts: Ibrahim, Hollis-Jefferson 5		Pts: Brownlee 20; Rebs: Kouame 11; Asts: Brownlee 5

Olympic Expo Center Gymnasium, Hangzhou
Referees: Harja Jaladri (INA), Yuen Chun Yip (HKG), Paul Skayem (LBN)

== Final standing ==
Rank	Team	Pld	W	L
1st place, gold medalist(s)	Philippines	7	6	1
2nd place, silver medalist(s)	Jordan	6	5	1
3rd place, bronze medalist(s)	China	6	5	1
4	Chinese Taipei	7	4	3
5	Iran	6	5	1
6	Saudi Arabia	7	4	3
7	South Korea	7	4	3
8	Japan	6	3	3
9	Qatar	4	1	3
10	Bahrain	4	1	3
11	Kazakhstan	4	1	3
12	Hong Kong	4	1	3
13	United Arab Emirates	3	0	3
14	Mongolia	3	0	3
15	Indonesia	3	0	3
16	Thailand	3	0	3
