= Laurinavičius =

- Lithuanian surname
- m.: Laurinavičius
- f.: (unmarried): Laurinavičiūtė
- f.: (married): Laurinavičienė
- Origin: Lithuanian
- Related names: Alternative Lithuanian: Laurinaitis, Laurinkus; Polish: Ławrynowicz; Polish in Lithuanian spelling: Lavrinovič; Russian Lavrinovich, Ukrainian: Lavrynovych, Belarusian: Laurynovich

Laurinavičius is a Lithuanian language surname. Like many Lithuanian last names, due to historical reasons, it possesses a Slavicized ending -ičius and is related to Lithuanian last names Laurinaitis, Laurinkus, which are considered to be in true Lithuanian form.

The surname may refer to:

- Česlovas Laurinavičius, Lithuanian historian and politologist
- Bronius Laurinavičius, Lithuanian priest, Soviet dissident
- Elena Laurinavičienė, a Lithuanian Righteous Among the Nations
