= King George Secondary School =

Location
- 1755 Barclay Street; Vancouver, British Columbia, V6G 1K6; Canada; 49°17′22.65″N 123°8′12.58″W

Information
- School type: Secondary school
- Motto: "Magni Animo" (Great in Spirit)
- Founded: 1914 (first location); 1963 (current location)
- School district: School District 39 Vancouver
- Superintendent: Helen McGregor
- Area trustee: Janet Fraser
- School number: 3939001
- Principal: Tyler Evans
- Grades: 8-12
- Enrollment: 481
- Language: English
- Area: West End
- Colours: black and green
- Team name: Dragons
- Website: kg.vsb.bc.ca

King George Secondary School is a public secondary school located in the West End of Vancouver, British Columbia, Canada.

The school is located in the West End, with three elementary schools feeding in. Some students are from other areas of Vancouver who wish to be in a smaller school environment.

Since July 2006, King George Secondary was approved by International Baccalaureate (IB) to offer the International Baccalaureate Middle Years Programme for students in grades 8, 9, and 10, as one of the only 3 schools in the city to offer the MYP Programme. Starting the 2025-2026 school year, King George will no longer offer the International Baccalaureate Middle Years Programme.

The school is adjacent to the West End Community Centre, enabling youth to get more involved in their programs.

== Special programs ==
King George was an IB MYP approved school, offering the program to students in grade 8, 9, and 10.

King George also hosted City School, a program for grades 10, 11 and 12 that involved students leaving the traditional secondary school setting to work in a more challenging, independent setting, with a different schedule, smaller groups of people, and only a few different teachers. This program was described as a "school within a school". City School, established in 1971, was Vancouver's first public alternative program.

Formerly, a third program called Gateway was offered by the school. Unlike Tech Immersion or City School, this program was provided off school ground and maintained limited ties to the school. Gateway Alternate Education Program was aimed at at-risk youth who had been absent from schools for some time, as well as to those who were homeless. Only those who were referred by the Ministry of Children and Family Development or VSB could register and attend this program.

== Notable alumni ==
- Bill Mathews, geologist, volcanologist, and professor at the University of British Columbia; graduated 1935
- Harris Allan, actor (attended grades 8 through 12 from 1998 to 2003)
- Aidan Caves, Professional Cyclist, part of the first Canadian team to ride 4 km in under 4 minutes in Team Pursuit (2016) graduated 2012
- Percy Saltzman, the first weatherman in Canadian television history
- Vera Kobalia, Georgian, Minister of Economy and Sustainable Development since July 2, 2010
- Elsie MacGill, aeronautical engineer
- Avan Jogia, an actor on ABC Family's Twisted and Nickelodeon's Victorious.
- Mary Livingstone (born Sadie Marks), actress and wife of Jack Benny.
- Artour "Arteezy" Babaev, professional Dota 2 player and streamer.
- Diego Kapelan, professional basketball player, played NCAA Division I basketball at McNeese State University
- Alice M G White (1908-2007), award-winning author and playwright

== See also ==
- Royal eponyms in Canada
