= Virginijus Šeškus =

Lithuanian basketball coach (born 1967)

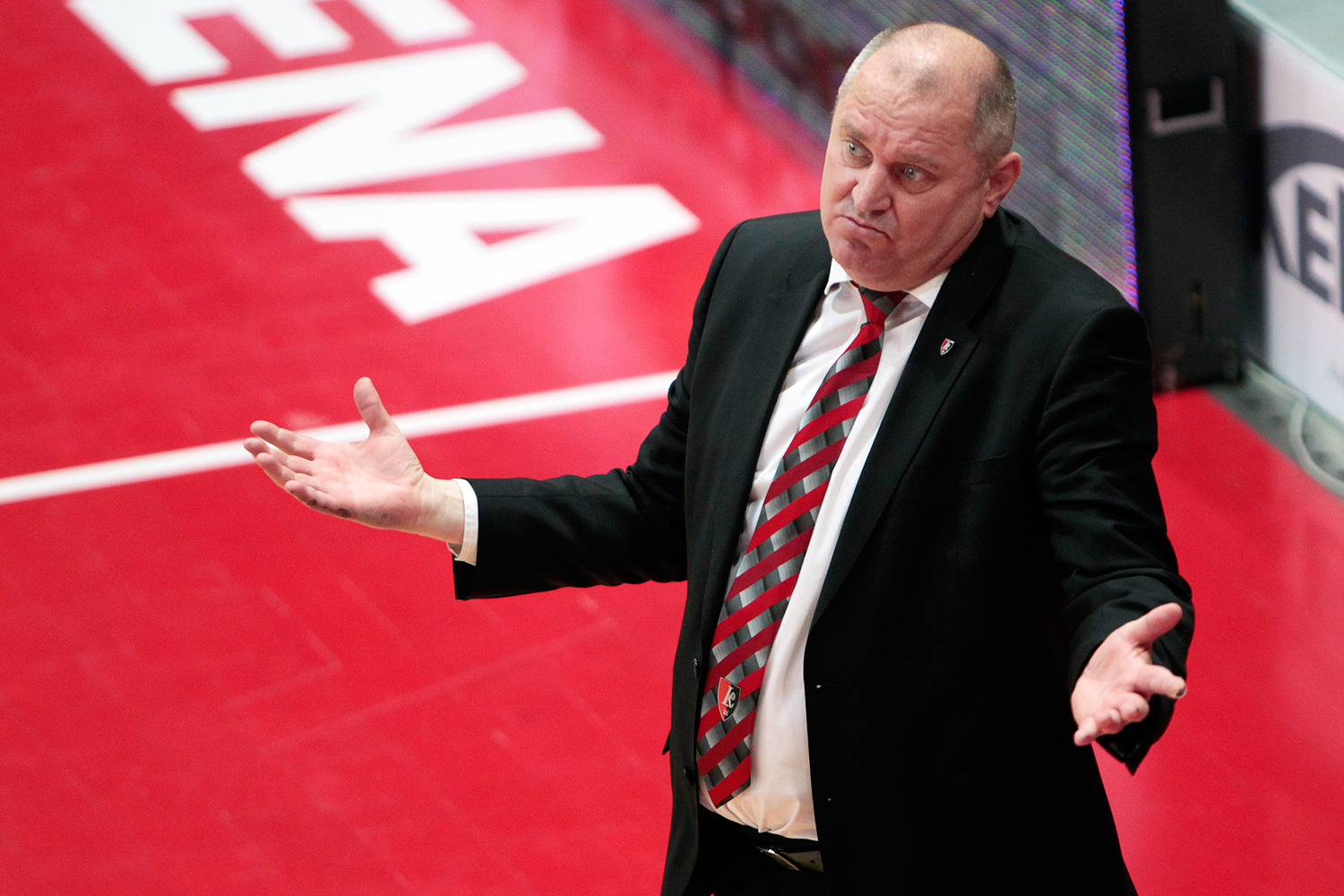
- Šeškus as the head coach of Lietuvos rytas in 2015

Personal information
- Born: February 8, 1967 (age 59) Prienai, Lithuanian SSR, USSR
- Coaching career: 2008–present

Career history

Coaching
- 2004–2006, 2007–2014: Prienai / Rūdupis / TonyBet
- 2014–2015: Lietuvos rytas Vilnius
- 2015–2019: Vytautas Prienai-Birštonas / Skycop Prienai
- 2020–2024: CBet Jonava
- 2024: M Basket Mažeikiai

Career highlights
- As head coach: LKL Coach of the Year (2023); 2× LKF Cup winner (2013, 2014); NKL champion (2009, 2021); Baltic BBL champion (2017)

Virginijus Šeškus (born February 8, 1967) is a Lithuanian professional basketball coach. He was previously the head coach of M Basket Mažeikiai of the Lithuanian Basketball League (LKL).

== Career ==
Virginijus Šeškus was born in Prienai, Lithuania. He trained children in Prienai sports school. Later, he became the head coach of BC Prienai of the secondary basketball league NKL, winning the NKL championship in 2009. Despite significant roster changes, he led his team to two BBL silver medals, two LKL bronze medals and two LKF Cup gold medals over a span of five years. Due to his achievements, Lithuanian basketball giant BC Lietuvos rytas hired him as the head coach in 2014. Due to inconsistent performance and inefficient rotations, he was terminated in February 2015 and later became the assistant coach of the team. He returned to his hometown club BC Prienai in July 2015. During the 2017-18 LKL season, Šeškus coached Ball brothers LiAngelo and LaMelo Ball during their brief stints in Prienai, also dealing with their father, LaVar, behind the scenes. The signing became a huge failure for the club - while Vytautas gained significant exposure, they finished in last place in the LKL. On August 23, 2018, he wrote a letter stating that, after relations soured, the Ball family "started destroying the club, not paying out prize money to the Big Baller Brand tournament winners, etc." Šeškus coached one more season in Prienai, with the team now renamed BC SkyCop, signing strong Lithuanian players, the Lavrinovič twins, Mindaugas Lukauskis and Martynas Gecevičius. Prienai returned to the playoffs that season, after which Šeškus left the club.

On 21 June 2020, Šeškus became the head coach of CBet Jonava of the National Basketball League (NKL). In the 2020–21 season, the team won their first-ever second division title and earned a historic promotion to the LKL. On 11 June 2023, Šeškus was named best coach of the 2022–23 LKL season, the first such award in his career. Under his guidance, the team greatly exceeded expectations by finishing 4th in the league, falling just short of Lietkabelis Panevėžys in the bronze series. The team were also the runners-up in the season's domestic cup, the 2023 King Mindaugas Cup, where it lost to Žalgiris Kaunas in the final game. On 15 July 2024, Šeškus parted ways with the club after four seasons together.

On 12 August 2024, Šeškus signed two-year (1+1) deal with M Basket Mažeikiai of the Lithuanian Basketball League (LKL).

== Personal life ==
Šeškus has two sons, Domantas and Edvinas, both of whom play basketball professionally.
