= DeMario Mayfield =

American-Iraqi basketball player

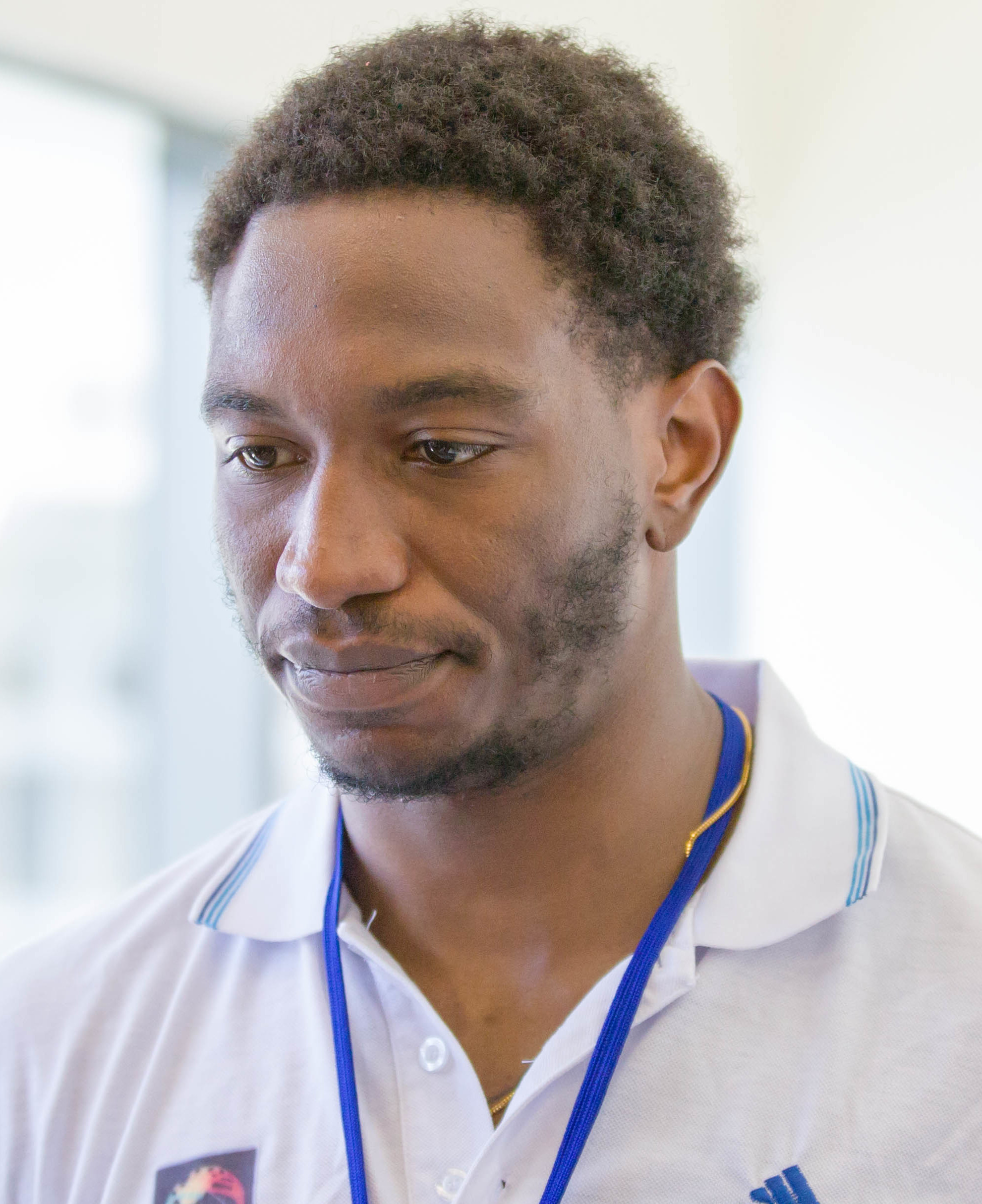
- Mayfield at the 2017 William Jones Cup

No. 15 – Latina Basket
- Position: Small forward
- League: Serie A2 Basket

Personal information
- Born: May 23, 1991 (age 35) Carnesville, Georgia
- Listed height: 6 ft 5 in (1.96 m)
- Listed weight: 210 lb (95 kg)

Career information
- High school: Franklin County (Carnesville, Georgia)
- College: Georgia (2009–2010); Charlotte (2011–2013); Angelo State (2014–2015)
- NBA draft: 2015: undrafted
- Playing career: 2015–present

Career history
- 2015–2016: Al Nift
- 2016: Uhud Medina
- 2016–2018: Al Nift
- 2018–2019: Prishtina
- 2019–2020: Al Nift
- 2020–2021: Heroes Den Bosch
- 2021–2022: Kleb Basket Ferrara
- 2022–2023: Basket Torino
- 2023: Heroes Den Bosch
- 2023: Orzinuovi Basket
- 2023–present: Latina Basket

Career highlights
- DBL All-Defense Team (2021)

DeMario Aquan Mayfield (born May 23, 1991) is an American-born naturalized Iraqi professional basketball player for Benacquista Assicurazioni Latina Basket of the Serie A2 Basket. He competed in college for Georgia, Charlotte, and Angelo State.

== High school career ==
Mayfield was a star basketball player at Franklin County High School. He was the 2009 Georgia High School Player of the Year. Mayfield was ranked No. 17 point guard in his class by ESPN and committed to Georgia. As a senior, he averaged 23.9 points, 6.7 assists and 5.1 rebounds per game.

== College career ==
Mayfield played one season at the University of Georgia and averaged about six minutes per game in 18 games. He transferred to Charlotte in search of more playing time and averaged 11.2 points and 7.0 rebounds per game as a sophomore. As a junior, he led the team in scoring with 11.7 points and 3.6 rebounds but did not play since January 26, 2013 due to undisclosed team rules violations. Mayfield was officially dismissed from the team on February 22.

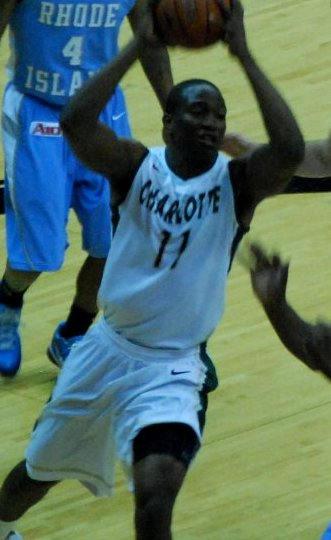
Mayfield playing for Charlotte

Mayfield decided to transfer to Morehead State. However, he never suited up for the team because he was arrested in Athens, Georgia, on the charge of conspiracy to commit armed robbery on May 27. Former Georgia football player Ricardo James Crawford was also arrested with Mayfield, and the two were found by police with guns, gloves and masks, and were also charged with possession of marijuana. Mayfield accepted a plea deal in which he had to serve 10 and a half months in a diversion center, which he described as like a “jail/work camp", and another year on probation. Mayfield's mentor Patrice Davis became an assistant coach at Abilene Christian University in the summer. He recommended the troubled basketball player to Angelo State coach Chris Beard, who added him to the roster.

As a senior at Division II Angelo State, Mayfield averaged 15.8 points, 8.0 rebounds and 3.9 assists per game and scored in double digits in 30 games. He helped lead the Rams to a 28-6 record and the first Sweet 16 in program history. Mayfield became the first Angelo State player to record a triple-double on December 16, 2014, when he scored 14 points, pulled down 10 rebounds and dished out 13 assists in a win over Arlington Baptist College. He had a career-high 24 points along with seven rebounds in a win over Texas A&M–Commerce in the NCAA Tournament. Mayfield was a First-team All-Lone Star Conference selection and was twice named LSC Offensive Player of the Week and once named LSC Defensive Player of the Week. He was an NABC and Daktronics All-South Central second-team selection.

== Professional career ==
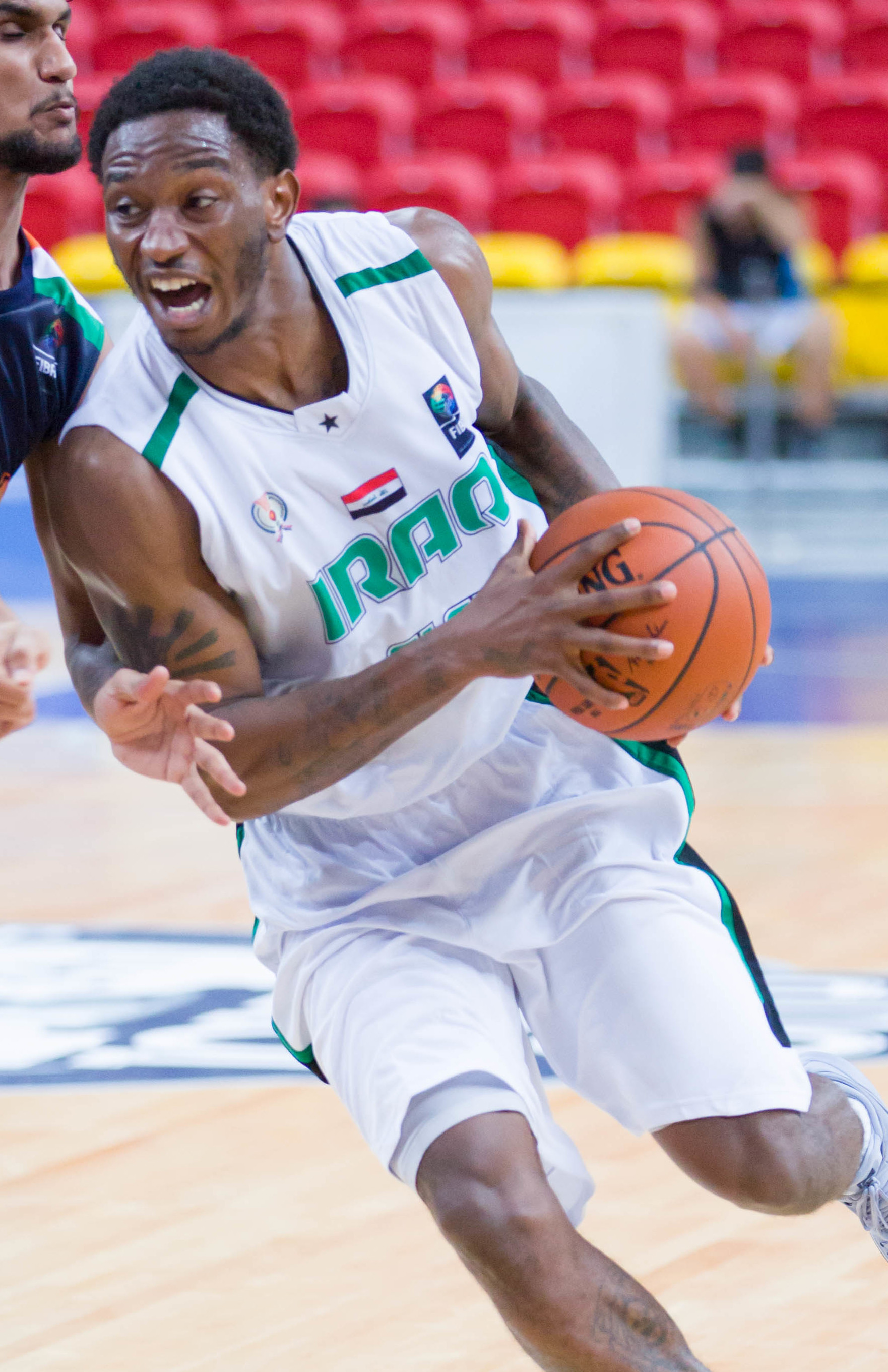
Mayfield with Iraq at the 2017 William Jones Cup

Due to his criminal background, most teams in Europe or China refused to sign Mayfield. On July 16, 2015, Mayfield signed his first professional contract with Al Nift of the Iraqi Basketball League. He became the third Angelo State player on the 2014–15 team to join a professional squad. "I'll learn a lot more about people in different regions of the world without passing judgment on other cultures," Mayfield said. He excelled in Iraq, averaging 33.2 points, 9.4 rebounds and 6.4 assists per game in his rookie season. On March 16, 2016, he was signed by the Saudi club Uhud Medina.

After a season in Saudi Arabia, Mayfield re-joined Al Nift. He posted 29 points, eight rebounds and eight assists per game and led the club to its first championship. Mayfield also developed friendships with his Iraqi teammates, some of whom he considers brothers, and was provided accommodation in a Baghdad hotel, meals prepared by the hotel's chef and a driver in addition to his salary. Mayfield was named Asia-Basket.com All-Iraqi League Player of the Year and Asia-Basket.com All-Iraqi League Import Player of the Year in 2017. On August 24, 2018, Mayfield signed with Sigal Prishtina of the Kosovan league. He spent the 2019-20 season with Al Nift. On August 2, 2020, Mayfield signed with Heroes Den Bosch of the Dutch Basketball League. After the DBL regular season, he was named to the DBL All-Defense Team.

On July 15, 2021, Mayfield signed with Kleb Basket Ferrara of the Serie A2 Basket. After a stint with Serie A2 club Basket Torino from 2022-2023, Mayfield returned to Den Bosch for the 2023-24 season. After just a few appearances with the club, Mayfield returned to the Italian Serie A2 to play for Agribertocchi Orzinuovi Basket until moving to fellow Serie A2 club Benacquista Assicurazioni Latina Basket two months later.

== The Basketball Tournament ==
Mayfield competed for D2 in The Basketball Tournament 2020. He added nine points, four assists and nine rebounds in a 79-74 opening round loss to Big X.

== National team ==
Mayfield was granted Iraqi citizenship in 2017 and joined the national basketball team. He replaced Kevin Galloway as the team's designated naturalized player. In his first game in the qualification for the 2019 FIBA World Cup, Mayfield contributed 24 points, 10 rebounds, 5 assists and 5 steals in a win over Iran in November 2017.

== Personal life ==
Mayfield is married to Jasmine Robinson and has a son, Demario Jr. They live in Jacksonville, Florida. His mother Tina Mayfield, was a junior college all-American at Emmanuel College before transferring to the University of Tennessee-Chattanooga. His brother, Keshaun Mayfield, played basketball at Lindsey Wilson College. Mayfield's late cousin Tony Jones started at left tackle for the Denver Broncos in the late 1990s.
