= Diego Kapelan =

Bosnian-Canadian coach and former basketball player

UBC Thunderbirds
- Position: Assistant coach
- League: Canada West

Personal information
- Born: July 8, 1987 (age 39) Bihać, SR Bosnia and Herzegovina; SFR Yugoslavia
- Listed height: 6 ft 4 in (1.93 m)
- Listed weight: 185 lb (84 kg)

Career information
- High school: King George (Vancouver, British Columbia)
- College: McNeese State (2007–2011)
- NBA draft: 2011: undrafted
- Playing career: 2011–2024
- Coaching career: 2026–present

Career history

Playing
- 2011–2012: Zrinjski Mostar
- 2012: ETB Wohnbau Baskets
- 2012–2013: Apollon Limassol
- 2013–2014: Kolossos Rodou
- 2014: ETB Wohnbau Baskets
- 2014–2015: WBC Wels
- 2015–2017: Ourense
- 2017–2018: Melilla
- 2018: Šiauliai
- 2018–2019: St. John's Edge
- 2019: Soles de Mexicali
- 2019: Gimnasia Indalo
- 2019: Fraser Valley Bandits
- 2019–2020: Granada
- 2020–2021: Real Murcia
- 2021–2022: CD Povoa
- 2022–2023: Ionikos Nikaias
- 2023–2024: Panserraikos

Coaching
- 2026-present: UBC (assistant)

Career highlights
- Portuguese League Top Scorer (2022); William Jones Cup MVP (2017); Austrian League All-Star (2015); Second-team All-Southland (2011)

Diego Kapelan (born July 8, 1987) is a Bosnian-Canadian professional basketball coach and former player who is an assistant coach for the UBC Thunderbirds men's basketball team. He played college basketball for McNeese State.

== Early life and high school ==
Kapelan was born in Bihać, a city located in what is now known as Bosnia and Herzegovina, to Zdravko and Hedita Kapelan. He attended King George Secondary School, a small high school in Vancouver, British Columbia. As a senior, Kapelan averaged 32 points, 6 rebounds, and 4 assists per game and was named team most valuable player (MVP) for his fourth straight season, leading his team to a lower mainland championship. He also ran cross country, winning a provincial title, and played soccer as a striker.

== College career ==
In his freshman season for McNeese State, Kapelan averaged 7.3 points, 1.8 rebounds, and 0.5 assists in 17.8 minutes per game. On February 9, 2008, he scored 24 points with 7 three-pointers in a 74–71 loss to Nicholls State. Kapelan averaged 11.7 points, 2.9 rebounds, and 0.7 assists per game as a sophomore. On February 18, 2009, he scored 37 points with a school-record 9 three-pointers to defeat Northwestern State. In his junior campaign, Kapelan averaged 12.6 points, 1.9 rebounds, and 1.2 assists per game. In January 2010, he was named player of the week in the Southland Conference, shortly after scoring 31 points with 8 three-pointers against Rice. As a senior, Kapelan averaged 14.9 points, 2.4 rebounds, and 1.1 assists per game. He scored a career-high 39 points with 9 three-pointers in a February 19, 2011 win over Northwestern State. He earned second-team All-Southland honors.

== Professional career ==
Kapelan played for Zrinjski Mostar of the Bosnian League and Balkan League in the 2011–12 season. Through 18 games, he averaged 14.3 points, 3.1 rebounds, and 1.7 assists per game. Kapelan scored a season-best 28 points on November 5, 2011, in an 85–77 win over Brotnjo. In January 2012, he left Zrinjski Mostar to sign with ETB Wohnbau Baskets of the ProA, the German second-tier league. Through 13 games in Germany, Kapelan averaged 16.8 points, 2.2 rebounds, and 1.4 assists per game. For the 2012–13 season, he joined Apollon Limassol of the Cypriot League and FIBA EuroChallenge. Through 23 Cypriot League games, he averaged 12.8 points, 2.7 rebounds, and 1.5 assists per game, and through 6 EuroChallenge games, he averaged 9.7 points per game. On January 8, 2013, Kapelan scored 25 points in a 96–92 win over APOEL.

On March 8, 2013, he moved to Kolossos Rodou of the Greek Basket League. After 7 games, he was averaging 6.4 points in 12.7 minutes per game. On January 30, 2014, after 3 games for Kolossos Rodou in the 2013–14 season, Kapelan returned to German team ETB Wohnbau Baskets. He scored 28 points on March 1, in a 109–103 win over VfL Kirchheim Knights. On May 28, 2014, Kapelan signed with WBC Wels of the Austrian League. Through 32 games, he averaged 13.4 points, 2.8 rebounds, and 2.3 assists per game. Kapelan scored 34 points with 6 three-pointers in a December 13 loss to Swans Gmunden. He took part in the league All-Star Game and led his team to the finals, while earning all-league honorable mention accolades from basketball website Eurobasket.com.

On September 16, 2015, Kapelan signed with Ourense of the LEB Oro, the second-tier Spanish league. Through 35 games, he averaged 14.1 points, 2.1 rebounds, and 1.3 assists per game. On November 20, 2015, he scored 25 points with 6 three-pointers in a 71–62 win over Miraflores. Kapelan remained with Ourense for the 2016–17 season, averaging 11.9 points, 2.2 rebounds, and 1.3 assists per game through 38 appearances. On August 16, 2017, he signed with LEB Oro team Melilla. After 48 games, he was averaging 11.3 points per game, leading Melilla to the playoff finals.

Kapelan, on July 14, 2018, signed with Šiauliai of the Lithuanian Basketball League. He left the team after only 6 games, scoring a season-high 11 points in a September 22 loss to Levski Sofia in Basketball Champions League qualification. In November, Kapelan joined the St. John's Edge of the National Basketball League of Canada. On November 18, 2018, in his Edge debut, he scored a team-best 22 points with 6 three-pointers in a 107–103 loss to the London Lightning.

In March 2019, he left the Edge to sign with Mexican team Soles de Mexicali for the 2018–19 LNBP playoffs.

On December 8, 2020, he signed with Real Murcia of the Spanish LEB Oro. He subsequently spent the next season with Portuguese club CD Povoa.

On September 13, 2022, Kapelan signed with Greek club Ionikos Nikaias. In 9 league games, and in spite of an injury-plagued season, he averaged 10.3 points, 1.9 rebounds and 1.1 assists, playing around 23 minutes per contest.

== National team career ==
Kapelan is a dual citizen of Bosnia and Herzegovina and Canada. He joined the Bosnian national team in preparation for EuroBasket 2011 but did not make the final roster. Kapelan joined Canadian team 3D Global Sports for the 2017 William Jones Cup in Taipei, Taiwan. He was named MVP after averaging 18 points, 4.4 rebounds, and 2.2 assists while shooting 53.3% from the three-point line.
