= Lavrinovič =

Lavrinovič is the Lithuanian spelling of the Polish surname Ławrynowicz used in Lithuania by Polish Lithuanians. The genuinely Lithuanian version of the surname is Laurinavičius.

The surname may refer to:

- Darjuš Lavrinovič (born 1979), Polish-Lithuanian basketball player
- Kšyštof Lavrinovič (born 1979), Polish-Lithuanian basketball player
