= Ławrynowicz =

Ławrynowicz is a Polish surname. It may refer to:

- Dariusz Ławrynowicz (born 1979), Lithuanian basketball player of Polish descent
- Krzysztof Ławrynowicz (born 1979), Lithuanian basketball player of Polish descent
- Małgorzata Ławrynowicz (born 1988), Polish group rhythmic gymnast
- Mirosław Ławrynowicz (1947–2005), Polish violinist
- Stanisław Ławrynowicz, Wilno school massacre perpetrator
