= Zijingang Campus, Zhejiang University =

University main campus in Hangzhou, China

- 浙江大学紫金港校区
- Established: October 6, 2002; 23 years ago
- Parent institution: Zhejiang University
- Location: 866 Yuhangtang Road, Hangzhou, Zhejiang, 310058, China; 30.30685°N 120.08178°E
- Campus: 580 hectares (1,400 acres)

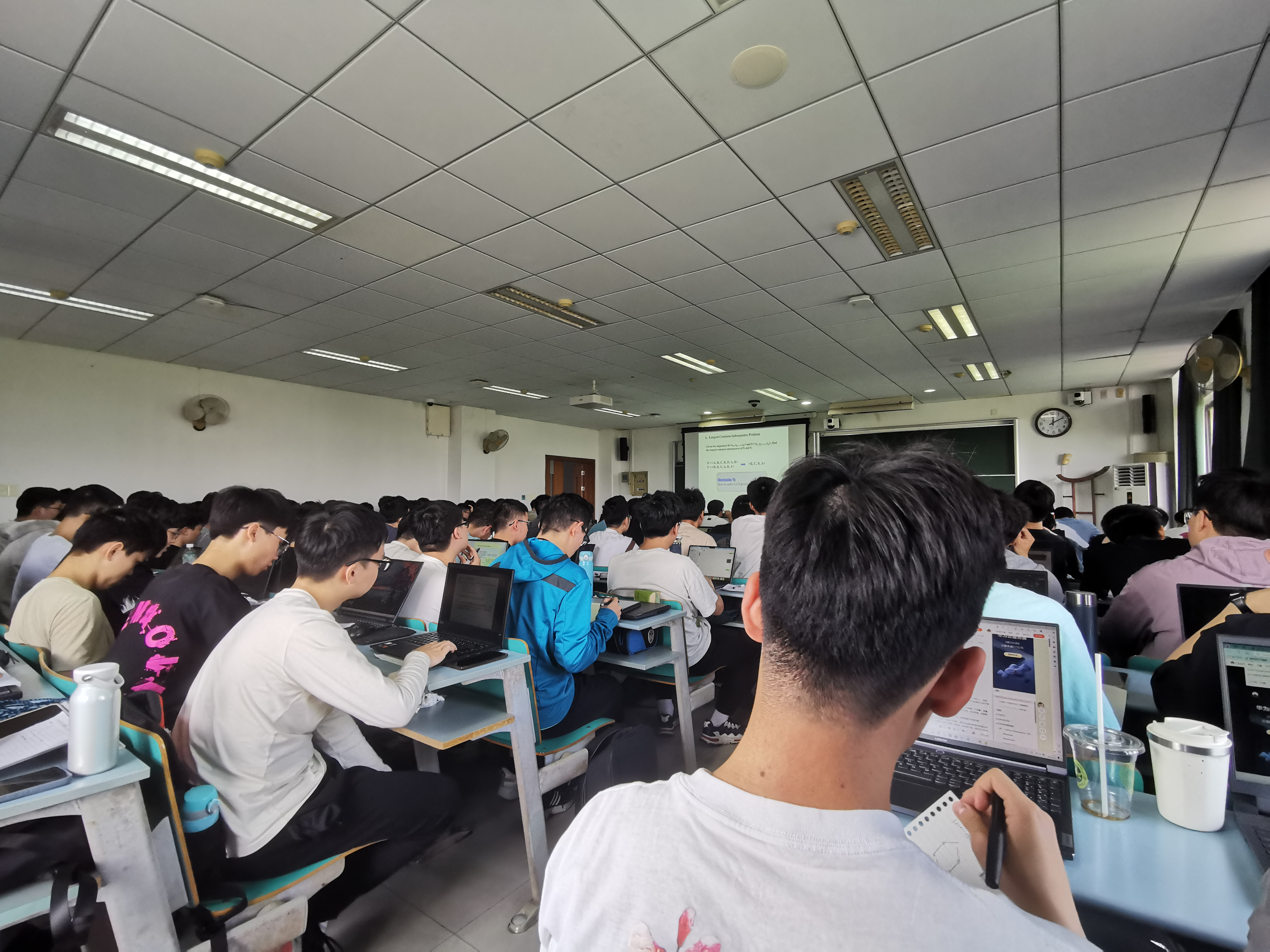
Students in a classroom in the West Teaching Area

Zijingang Campus is the main campus of Zhejiang University. Located in the west of urban Hangzhou, it borders the Yuhangtang River in the south, hence the name. With an area of 8,700 mu, it is the largest single university campus in mainland China.

== History ==
The construction of the eastern part of the campus was approved in October 2000, with planning starting in November, and land expropriation starting in December. During the planning period, the university launched a conception plan contest with Architecture Journal and a planning contest online, which received 76 planning designs from across the world. These designs were reviewed and moderated by renowned architects and designers. The construction formally began in September 2001, which was finished in October 2002.

Planning and design of the western part of the campus began in 2003, shortly after the completion of the eastern part. The construction began in May 2011. The western part came into use in 2019.

== Design ==
The eastern part of the campus is centred around the Qizhen Lake. The aim of the design is to building a modern, networked, gardened, ecological campus. Most buildings in the part are modern architectures with white exterior walls. The part is divided into several functional clusters, specialised for teaching, research and living, which are connected with a circuit road system. Between the functional clusters are a network of water bodies and gardens. However, the design of functional clusters also forces students and faculty to travel a long distance between the clusters for daily life, which popularises bicycles as a means of transport within the campus.

The western part of the campus is centred around the Qiushi Lake. Clustering of buildings are based on academic disciplines in order to building research-centred communities. These clusters are separated by rivers and the natural gardens alongside the rivers. In each cluster, academic buildings, typically with red brick exterior walls, centres around a courtyard, neighbouring research areas to the east. The Qiushi Academy cluster, which serves as museums and the auditorium, is a pseudo-classic architecture modelled after the traditional Chinese buildings of Qiushi Academy, the predecessor of the university.

== Institutions ==
All the administrative units headquarters and most of the academic departments headquarters at Zijingang.

- Administrative units
  - Office of the Presidents
  - Development and Planning Office
  - Office of Global Engagement
  - Human Resources Department
  - Undergraduate School
  - Graduate School
  - Sci-Tech Academy of Zhejiang University
  - Academy of Humanities and Social Sciences
  - Office of Capital Construction
  - Administration of Continuing Education
  - Division of Domestic Relations
  - Financial Department
  - Office of Laboratory and Equipment Management
  - News Office
  - Medical Management Office
  - Office of Safety and Security
  - Department of General Affairs
  - Office of Safety and Security
- Faculty of Arts and Humanities (headquartered)
  - School of Humanities
  - School of International Studies
  - College of Media and International Culture
- Faculty of Agriculture, Life and Environment Science (headquartered)
  - College of Life Sciences
  - College of Biosystem Engineering and Food Science
  - College of Environmental and Resource Sciences
  - College of Agriculture and Biotechnology
  - College of Animal Sciences
- Faculty of Medicine (headquartered)
  - College of Pharmaceutical Sciences
  - School of Medicine
- Faculty of Engineering
  - College of Civil Engineering and Architecture
