= Mirosław Ławrynowicz =

- Born: 16 June 1947; Warsaw, Poland
- Died: 6 April 2005 (age 57) Warsaw, Poland
- Instrument: violin

Mirosław Ławrynowicz (born June 16, 1947, in Warsaw, Poland and died April 6, 2005, in Warsaw, Poland) was a Polish violinist and teacher.

== Biography ==
=== Youth ===
Ławrynowicz was born on 16 June 1947 in Warsaw. He finished the National High School of Music in 1975 (currently the Chopin University of Music) and studied musicology at the University of Warsaw. He continued learning the violin with Jean Fournier in France and Wolfgang Marschner in Germany.

=== Career ===
Throughout his career Ławrynowicz performed in multiple recitals, played with many orchestras, and performed solos in Poland as well as in Austria, Bulgaria, Czechoslovakia, Cuba, Finland, France, Germany, Hungary, Italy, Netherlands, Spain, Sweden, the United States (among others in Carnegie Hall), and Yugoslavia. He also frequently recorded for the second program of the Polish Radio. Ławrynowicz also made many steps as a publicist, he prepared for print pieces by renowned Polish composers such as Karol Lipiński and Henryk Wieniawski.

Ławrynowicz was also highly successful in many international music competitions. He was a laureate of the International Modern Music Contest in Rotterdam in 1973 (in the category of string quartet ), the International Bayerischer Rundfunk Contest in Munich in 1974 (in the category of violin - piano duet, with his wife Krystya Makowska-Ławrynowicz on piano), the International Podium of Young Musicians in Paris in 1980, and the International Music Contest in Belgrade in 1982.

Ławrynowicz served on the juries in multiple of local and international music competitions including:

- Groblicz Family International Violin Competition in Kraków (August 1996)
- Stanisław Serwaczyński Competition for Young Violinists in Lublin (September 1996)
- International Violin Competition in Kloster-Schöntal (July/August 1997)pp
- Louis Spohr International Violin Competition in Freiburg (August 1997)
- Karol Szymanowski International Competition i Łódź (September 1997)
- Aleksandra Januszajtis Polish Violin Competition (November 1997)
- International Competition for Young Violinists (three times)
- International Competition of String Quartets in Sondershausen (twice)

Since 1993 Ławrynowicz was the artistic director and professor of Musical Courses in Łańcut, as well as Musical Workshops in Zakopane which were intended for recipients of scholarships from the Polish Children's Fund. He was a co-organizers and professor at Springtime Courses in Goch, Germany and a professor at Musical Courses for students from Japan at the Chopin University of Music (August 1997). Ławrynowicz was also a professor at a courses for students at Montclair University in New Jersey (October 1997).

Among other awards Ławrynowicz was presented the Medal of the Educational Commission (KEN), the Polish Cross of Merit, as well as diplomas from the Polish Ministry of Foreign Affairs for promoting Polish culture abroad and from the Polish Ministry of Culture for helping in the support of talented youth. He was also decorated as Meritorious for Polish Culture.

He began lecturing as a professor at the Chopin University of Music in 1997. As a professor, Ławrynowicz taught Polish musicians such as Monika Jarecka, Andrzej Gębski, Ryszard Groblewski, Dobrosława Siudmak, Agnieszka Marucha, Maria Machowska, Krzysztof Specjał, and Janusz Wawrowski.
