= Shuto Ando =

Japanese basketball player (born 1994)

Shuto Ando 安藤周人
No. 9 – Alvark Tokyo
- Position: Shooting guard
- League: B.League

Personal information
- Born: June 13, 1994 (age 32) Mie Prefecture
- Listed height: 6 ft 3 in (1.91 m)
- Listed weight: 192 lb (87 kg)

Career information
- High school: Yokkaichi Technical (Yokkaichi, Mie)
- College: Aoyama Gakuin University
- Playing career: 2017–present

Career history
- 2017–2020: Nagoya Diamond Dolphins
- 2021–Present: Alvark Tokyo
Medals
Representing Japan
William Jones Cup
Bronze medal – third place	2019 ROC	Team

Shuto Ando (安藤 周人, Andō Shuto; born June 13, 1994) is a Japanese professional basketball player who plays for Alvark Tokyo of the B.League in Japan. He represented the country in basketball.

He is a native of the Mie Prefecture.
