= Takuma Sato (basketball) =

Japanese basketball player (born 1995)

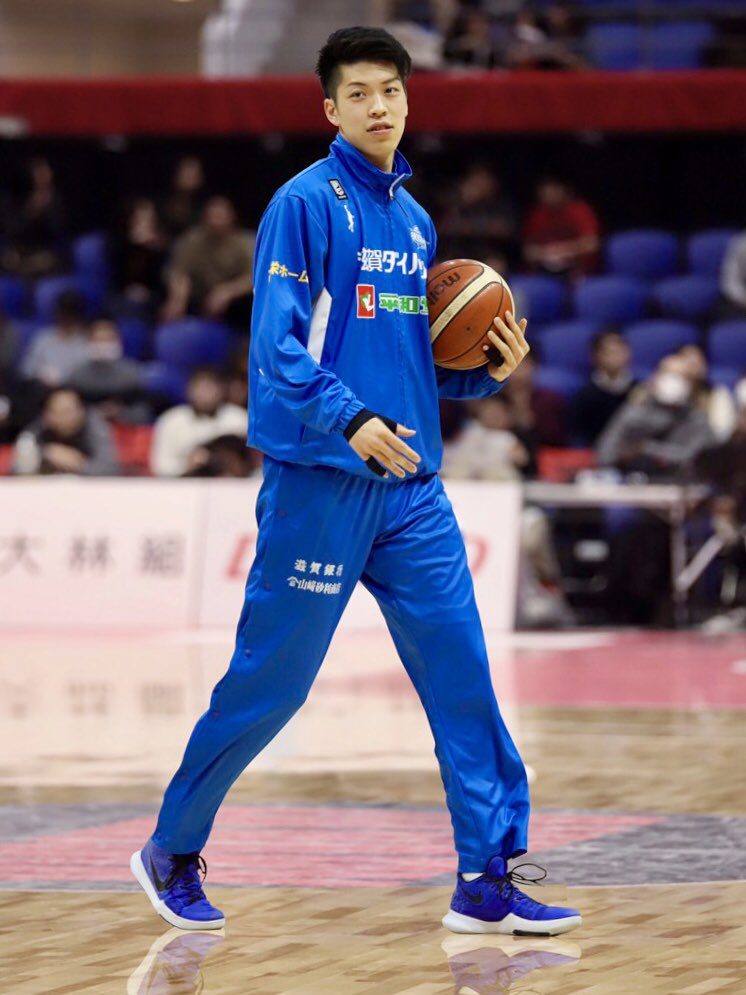

No. 14 – Chiba Jets Funabashi
- Position: Small forward
- League: B.League

Personal information
- Born: May 10, 1995 (age 31) Hokkaido
- Listed height: 6 ft 5 in (1.96 m)
- Listed weight: 192 lb (87 kg)

Career information
- High school: Tokai University No. 4 High School (Minami-ku, Sapporo)
- College: Tokai University
- Playing career: 2018–present

Career history
- 2018-2020: Shiga Lakestars
- 2020–present: Chiba Jets Funabashi

Career highlights

Takuma Sato (佐藤 卓磨, Satō Takuma; born May 10, 1995) is a Japanese professional basketball player for Chiba Jets of the B.League in Japan. He played college basketball for Tokai University.

On August 20, 2018, the Japanese Olympic Committee penalized Sato after he was found to have solicited prostitutes while in Jakarta for the 2018 Asian Games. He was ultimately suspended from official competition for a year.
