= Domantas Šeškus =

Lithuanian basketball player (born 1992)

Domantas Šeskus
Personal information
- Born: December 2, 1992 (age 33) Prienai, Lithuania
- Listed height: 6 ft 0 in (1.83 m)
- Listed weight: 170 lb (77 kg)

Career information
- Playing career: 2010–present
- Position: Shooting guard / point guard

Career history
- 2010–2017: Rūdupis/TonyBet/Vytautas Prienai
- 2010–2011: →BC Prienai-2
- 2017–2018: Cognac Charente
- 2018–2019: SkyCop Prienai
- 2019-2020: Primelab Angri Pallacanestro
- 2020-2021: Melfa’s Gela Basket
- 2021-2022: Andrea Costa Imola
- 2022-2023: La Spezia Basket Club
- 2023-2025: KKSC-Mačiūnai/Tikodenta Prienai
- 2025-2026: Akvilė Druskininkai

Domantas Šeskus (born 2 December 1992) is a Lithuanian professional basketball player. He is the older son of coach Virginijus Šeškus.
