= Edvinas Šeškus =

Lithuanian basketball player (born 1995)

Free agent
- Position: Shooting guard / small forward

Personal information
- Born: March 10, 1995 (age 31) Prienai, Lithuania
- Listed height: 6 ft 5 in (1.96 m)
- Listed weight: 210 lb (95 kg)

Career information
- Playing career: 2008–present

Career history
- 2008–2010: Rūdupis Prienai
- 2010–2015: Lietuvos rytas
- 2010–2012: →Perlas-MRU
- 2012–2013: →Sakalai Vilnius
- 2015: →Perlas-MRU
- 2015–2016: Vytautas Prienai-Birštonas
- 2016–2017: Pärnu
- 2017–2018: Vytautas Prienai-Birštonas
- 2018–2019: Taiwan Beer
- 2019–2020: Pauian Archiland
- 2020–2024: CBet Jonava

Career highlights
- NKL Final Four MVP (2021)

Edvinas Šeškus (born 10 March 1995) is a Lithuanian basketball player who recently played for CBet Jonava of the Lithuanian Basketball League. He mainly plays the shooting guard position. He is 196 cm (6 ft 5 in) tall and weighs 100 kg (220 lb).

== Career ==
A 13-year-old Šeškus started his career with BC Rūdupis of the NKL in 2008, scoring four points and grabbing a rebound against BC Alytus. The next season, he became the youngest player ever to debut in the strongest Lithuanian basketball league, the LKL. He recorded 2 turnovers against BC Perlas. In 2010, he played for BC Perlas-MRU and then transferred to Šarūnas Marčiulionis Basketball Academy, both times struggling to establish himself as the leader in the NKL, but dominating in the MKL league, averaging about 23 points in 30 minutes of playing time while representing the academy in his age group. He played for Vilnius Sakalai during the 2012–2013 season. Šeškus played for 1 1/2 seasons for Lietuvos Rytas Vilnius before returning to BC Perlas on a loan in January 2015.

In the 2014–15 season, Šeškus's averages in EuroCup and LKL totaled about 3 points per game.

== Personal life ==
Edvinas is the son of Virginijus Šeškus, a longtime BC Prienai coach. His older brother Domantas also plays basketball professionally.

Šeškus is a husband of Dalia Belickaitė.
