= Takumi Saito (basketball) =

Japanese basketball player (born 1995)

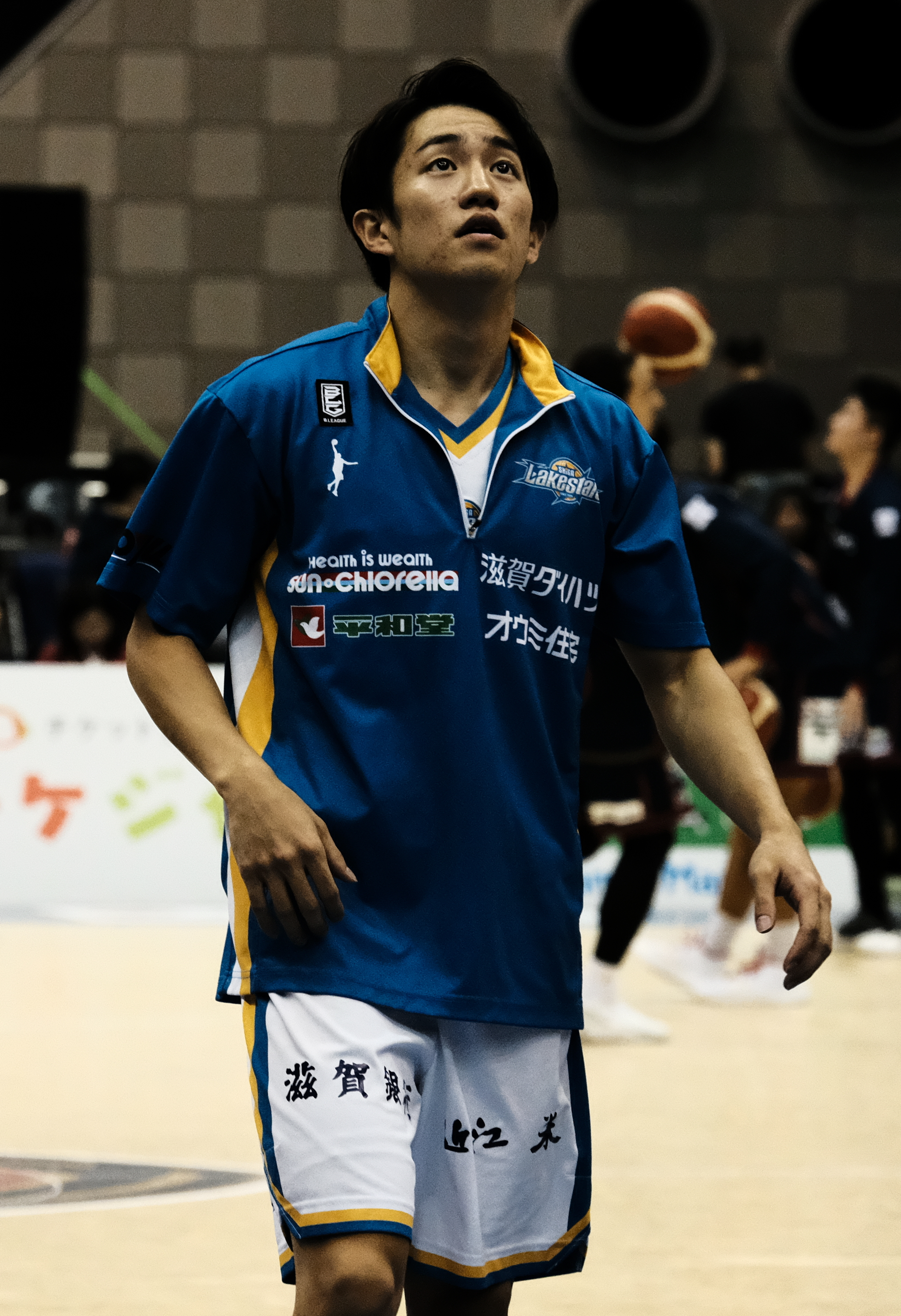

No. 2 – Nagoya Diamond Dolphins
- Position: Point Guard
- League: B.League

Personal information
- Born: 11 August 1995 (age 31) Kanagawa, Japan
- Listed height: 5 ft 7 in (1.70 m)
- Listed weight: 152 lb (69 kg)

Career information
- High school: Tōkōgakuen Junior and Senior High School
- College: Meiji University
- Playing career: 2017–present

Career history
- 2017–2019: Alvark Tokyo
- 2029–2020: Shiga Lakes
- 2020–present: Nagoya Diamond Dolphins

Takumi Saito (齋藤 拓実, Saitō Takumi; born August 11, 1995) is a Japanese professional basketball player for the Nagoya Diamond Dolphins of the B.League.

== Professional career ==
During the 2017–18 B.League season, Saito played on the Tokyo Alvark under special designated player status. He played in nine games, averaging 2.0 points and 0.8 assists. On June 13, 2018, it was announced that he would extend his contract for the 2018–19 season. He played in 28 games, averaging 3.6 points and 2.0 assists.

On May 30, 2019, it was announced that he would be loaned to the Shiga Lakes. During his time with the Lakes, he started every game and averaged 13 points and 5.4 assists.

On April 24, 2020, it was announced that he would not renew his contract with Alvark Tokyo for the next season. On May 28, 2020, it was announced that he would be transferring to the Nagoya Diamond Dolphins.

== National team career ==
Saito represented Japan at the 2023 FIBA Basketball World Cup Asian Qualifiers.

In November 2025, it was announced that he would return to the national team for the 2027 FIBA Basketball World Cup Asian Qualifiers. In Window 2, he started in both games and contributed 9.0 points and 4.0 assists in a win against Korea.
