= 2024 Arab Club Basketball Championship =

Basketball tournament season

بطولة الأندية العربية لكرة السلة 2024

Tournament details
- Country: Egypt
- Dates: 1–12 October 2024
- Teams: 12

Final positions
- Champions: (Qatar) Al-Arabi (1st title)
- Runners-up: (Egypt) Al Ittihad Alexandria
- Third place: (Egypt) Sporting Alexandria
- Fourth place: Kuwait Club

Tournament statistics
- Scoring leader(s): Moustafa Foda (Al-Arabi)

Awards
- MVP: Mustafa Rashed (Al-Arabi)

The 2024 Arab Club Basketball Championship (Arabic: بطولة الأندية العربية لكرة السلة 2024) was the 36th season of the Arab Club Basketball Championship. The tournament was held from 1 October to 12 October 2024, and was hosted in Alexandria, Egypt.

The season consisted of 12 teams, six less than the previous tournament. The group stage format was changed to two groups of six, and eight teams qualified for the playoffs.

Al-Arabi from Qatar won its first Arab championship.

== Group stage ==
=== Group A ===
Pos	Team	Pld	W	L	GF	GA	GD	Pts	Qualification
1	(Egypt) Al Ittihad Alexandria	5	5	0	446	345	+101	10	Advance to playoffs
2	(Qatar) Al-Arabi	5	4	1	437	400	+37	9	Advance to playoffs
3	(Egypt) Smouha	5	2	3	420	443	−23	7	Advance to playoffs
4	(Kuwait) Kazma	5	2	3	375	402	−27	7	Advance to playoffs
5	(United Arab Emirates) Al Bataeh	5	1	4	377	415	−38	6	
6	(United Arab Emirates) Al Sharjah	5	1	4	371	421	−50	6	

Source: Afrobasket

=== Group B ===
Pos	Team	Pld	W	L	GF	GA	GD	Pts	Qualification
1	(Kuwait) Qadsia	5	5	0	503	403	+100	10	Advance to playoffs
2	(Egypt) Sporting Alexandria	5	4	1	452	357	+95	9	Advance to playoffs
3	(Qatar) Al Gharafa	5	3	2	456	430	+26	8	Advance to playoffs
4	(United Arab Emirates) Al Wahda	5	2	3	414	471	−57	7	Advance to playoffs
5	(Oman) Al Seeb	5	1	4	397	448	−51	6	
6	(Yemen) Shaa'b Hader Mot	5	0	5	433	546	−113	5	

Source: Afrobasket

== Playoffs ==
Quarter-finals
(Egypt) Al Ittihad Alexandria	123
(United Arab Emirates) Al Wahda	100
(Egypt) Sporting Alexandria	82
(Egypt) Smouha	73
(Qatar) Al-Arabi	92
(Qatar) Al-Gharafa	73
(Kuwait) Qadsia	77
(Kuwait) Kazma	88

Semi-finals
(Egypt) Al Ittihad Alexandria	83
(Egypt) Sporting Alexandria	72
(Qatar) Al-Arabi	87
(Kuwait) Kazma	80

Final
(Egypt) Al Ittihad Alexandria	71
(Qatar) Al-Arabi	81
Third place
(Egypt) Sporting Alexandria	95
(Kuwait) Kazma	79
