= 2022 Arab Club Basketball Championship =

34th season of the Arab Club Basketball Champions Cup

بطولة الأندية العربية لكرة السلة 2022

Tournament details
- Country: Kuwait
- Dates: 5 – 15 October 2022
- Teams: 16

Final positions
- Champions: Kuwait SC (1st title)
- Runners-up: (Egypt) Al Ahly Cairo
- Third place: (Lebanon) Beirut Club
- Fourth place: (Kuwait) Kazma

The 2022 Arab Club Basketball Championship (Arabic: بطولة الأندية العربية لكرة السلة 2022) was the 34th season of the Arab Club Basketball Championship. The tournament is held from 5 October to 15 October 2022 in Kuwait. Al Ahly was the defending champion. All games are played in the Al-Ittihad Hall in Kuwait City.

Kuwait SC won its first Arab championship after defeating Al Ahly Cairo in the final, which was a re-match of the previous year.

== Teams ==
Contrary to other seasons, no teams from Tunisia, Saudi Arabia and the United Arab Emirates participated. The following teams qualified for the season:

- (Egypt) Al Ahly Cairo (1st)
- (Egypt) Al Ittihad Alexandria (2nd)
- Kuwait
- (Kuwait) Al-Jahra
- (Kuwait) Kazma
- (Qatar) Al-Gharafa
- (Qatar) Al Sadd
- (Algeria) WA Boufarik
- (Lebanon) Beirut Club
- (Lebanon) Al Riyadi
- (Oman) Al Bashaer
- (Syria) Al-Ittihad Aleppo
- (Libya) Al Ahly Benghazi
- (Iraq) Dijlah University
- (Bahrain) Al-Ahli Manama
- (Yemen) Al Mena

== Regular season ==
The draw for the groups was held 18 August 2022.

=== Group A ===
Pos	Team	Pld	W	L	PF	PA	PD	Pts
1	Kuwait	3	3	0	217	190	+27	6
2	(Egypt) Al Ittihad Alexandria	3	2	1	293	190	+103	5
3	(Libya) Al Ahly Benghazi	3	1	2	203	269	−66	4
4	(Syria) Al-Ittihad Aleppo	3	0	3	182	245	−63	3

Source: Asia-Basket.com

=== Group B ===
Pos	Team	Pld	W	L	PF	PA	PD	Pts
1	(Egypt) Al Ahly Cairo	3	3	0	326	183	+143	6
2	(Lebanon) Al Riyadi	3	2	1	258	208	+50	5
3	(Qatar) Al-Gharafa	3	1	2	203	265	−62	4
4	(Yemen) Al Mena	3	0	3	180	311	−131	3

Source: Asia-Basket.com

=== Group C ===
Pos	Team	Pld	W	L	PF	PA	PD	Pts
1	(Kuwait) Kazma	3	2	1	260	247	+13	5
2	(Bahrain) Al-Ahli Manama	3	2	1	214	212	+2	5
3	(Oman) Al Bashaer	3	1	2	234	253	−19	4
4	(Qatar) Al Sadd	3	1	2	236	232	+4	4

Source: Asia-Basket.com

sp

=== Group D ===
Pos	Team	Pld	W	L	PF	PA	PD	Pts
1	(Lebanon) Beirut Club	3	3	0	260	238	+22	6
2	(Kuwait) Al-Jahra	3	2	1	231	208	+23	5
3	(Iraq) Dijlah University	3	1	2	223	222	+1	4
4	(Algeria) WA Boufarik	3	0	3	203	249	−46	3

Source: Asia-Basket.com

== Knock-out stage ==
Round of 16
10 October
Kuwait	104
(Yemen) Al Mena	55
10 October
(Bahrain) Al-Ahli Manama	96
(Iraq) Dijlah University	98
11 October
(Lebanon) Beirut Club	87
(Qatar) Al Sadd	64
11 October
(Lebanon) Al Riyadi	98
(Libya) Al Ahly Benghazi	80
11 October
(Egypt) Al Ahly Cairo	86
(Syria) Al-Ittihad Aleppo	77
11 October
(Kuwait) Al-Jahra	69
(Oman) Al Bashaer	53
11 October
(Kuwait) Kazma	90
(Algeria) WA Boufarik	74
10 October
(Egypt) Al Ittihad Alexandria	109
(Qatar) Al-Gharafa	70

Quarterfinals
12 October
Kuwait	97
(Iraq) Dijlah University	79
12 October
(Lebanon) Beirut Club	80
(Lebanon) Al Riyadi	76
12 October
(Egypt) Al Ahly Cairo	93
(Kuwait) Al-Jahra	54
12 October
(Kuwait) Kazma (OT)	106
(Egypt) Al Ittihad Alexandria	101

Semifinals
14 October
Kuwait	87
(Lebanon) Beirut Club	74
14 October
(Egypt) Al Ahly Cairo	91
(Kuwait) Kazma	87

Finals
15 October
Kuwait	78
(Egypt) Al Ahly Cairo	77
Third place game
15 October
(Lebanon) Beirut Club (OT)	102
(Kuwait) Kazma	97

=== Round of 16 ===
10 October 2022
12:00

Boxscore

Al-Ittihad Alexandria (Egypt)	109–70	(Qatar) Al-Gharafa
Pts: Mido Mohamed 18; Rebs: Anas Mahmoud 8 Asts: Sean Armand 5		Pts: Nedim Muslic 18; Rebs: Music, Mohammed 6 Asts: Siad 3

Al-Ittihad Hall, Kuwait City, Kuwait

10 October 2022
14:05

Boxscore

Kazma (Kuwait)	90–74	(Algeria) WA Boufarik
Pts: Latavious Williams 25; Rebs: Latavious Williams 23; Asts: Ahmad Al-Baloushi 10		Pts: Zaitoni Rabeh 20; Rebs: Zaitoni Rabeh 13; Asts: Abdelhalim Kaouane 4

Al-Ittihad Hall, Kuwait City, Kuwait

10 October 2022
16:20

Boxscore

Al-Ahli Manama (Bahrain)	96–98	(Iraq) Dijlah University
Pts: Davon Jefferson 30; Rebs: Davon Jefferson 19; Asts: Davon Jefferson 7		Pts: Elijah Robinson 38; Rebs: Nawras Altaleb 19; Asts: Robinson, English 5

Al-Ittihad Hall, Kuwait City, Kuwait

10 October 2022
18:45

Boxscore

Kuwait	104–55	(Yemen) Al Mena
Scoring by quarter: 26–7, 20–16, 30–16, 28–16
Pts: Cady Lalanne 21; Rebs: Omran Johar 11; Asts: Georges-Hunt, Algheis 5		Pts: Mostafa Tarawry 18; Rebs: Farhan, Rosser 6 Asts: Six players 1

Al-Ittihad Hall, Kuwait City, Kuwait

11 October 2022
12:00

Boxscore

Al Ahly Cairo (Egypt)	87–76	(Syria) Al-Ittihad Aleppo
Scoring by quarter: 25–17, 17–15, 22–18, 23–22
Pts: Ehab Amin 11; Rebs: Amin, Ismail 5 Asts: Fakuade, Amin 4		Pts: Brandon Spearman 24; Rebs: Igor Chumakov 9 Asts: Brandon Spearman 6

Al-Ittihad Hall, Kuwait City, Kuwait

11 October 2022
16:10

Boxscore

Al Riyadi (Lebanon)	98–80	(Libya) Al-Ahly Benghazi
Pts: Michael Qualls 27; Rebs: Ater Majok 11; Asts: Ali Mansur 5		Pts: Cleveland Thomas 27; Rebs: Staphon Blair 10; Asts: Cleveland Thomas 4

Al-Ittihad Hall, Kuwait City, Kuwait

11 October 2022
16:10

Boxscore

Beirut Club (Lebanon)	87–64	(Qatar) Al Sadd
Scoring by quarter: 25–10, 23–22, 17–17, 22–15
Pts: Michael Dixon 22; Rebs: Omar Jamaleddine 8 Asts: Elias Rustom 5		Pts: Mohamed Elsadi 15; Rebs: Babacar Dieng 8 Asts: Mohamed Elsadi 8

Al-Ittihad Hall, Kuwait City, Kuwait

11 October 2022
18:15

Boxscore

Al-Jahra (Kuwait)	69–53	(Oman) Al Bashaer
Pts: Chinemelu Elonu 22; Rebs: Salah Mejri 19; Asts: Mused Alotaibi 5		Pts: Christopher Brady 14; Rebs: Christopher Brady 11; Asts: Al-Soomali, Alhalahli 3

Al-Ittihad Hall, Kuwait City, Kuwait

=== Quarterfinals ===
12 October 2022
12:00

Boxscore

Al Ittihad Alexandria (Egypt)	101–106 (OT)	(Kuwait) Kazma
Scoring by quarter: 25–18, 21–27, 19–24, 19–25, Overtime: 7–12
Pts: Kyndall Dykes 33; Rebs: Anas Mahmoud 16; Asts: Three players 2		Pts: Kevin Murphy 53; Rebs: Latavious Williams 20; Asts: Murphy, Al-Baloushi 5

Al-Ittihad Hall, Kuwait City, Kuwait

12 October 2022
14:40

Boxscore

Al Riyadi (Lebanon)	76–80	(Lebanon) Beirut Club
Scoring by quarter: 14–22, 11–23, 19–15, 32–20
Pts: Ater Majok 19; Rebs: Ater Majok 13; Asts: Gyokchyan, Zeinoun 4		Pts: Kenneth Horton 27; Rebs: Ali Haidar 14; Asts: Ali Haidar 5

Al-Ittihad Hall, Kuwait City, Kuwait

12 October 2022
16:55

Boxscore

Al Ahly Cairo (Egypt)	93–54	(Kuwait) Al-Jahra
Pts: Ahmed Ismail 16; Rebs: Amr Gendy 6 Asts: Marwan Sarhan 6		Pts: Chinemelu Elonu 20; Rebs: Chinemelu Elon 11; Asts: Two players 2

Al-Ittihad Hall, Kuwait City, Kuwait

12 October 2022
19:10

Boxscore

Kuwait	97–79	(Iraq) Dijlah University
Scoring by quarter: 23–20, 25–22, 30–19, 19–18
Pts: Alexander Algheis 18; Rebs: Cady Lalanne 12; Asts: Marcus Georges-Hunt 7		Pts: Abdullah Majed 20; Rebs: Nawras Altaleb 9 Asts: Elijah Robinson 7

Al-Ittihad Hall, Kuwait City, Kuwait

=== Semifinals ===
14 October 2022
16:00

Report

Kazma (Kuwait)	87–91	(Egypt) Al Ahly Cairo
Pts: Kevin Murphy 29; Rebs: Latavious Williams 10; Asts: Ahmad Al-Baloushi 9		Pts: Ehab Amin 31; Rebs: Seif Samir 10; Asts: Amr Gendy 4

Al-Ittihad Hall, Kuwait City, Kuwait

14 October 2022
18:10

Report

Kuwait	84–74	(Lebanon) Beirut Club
Pts: Cady Lalanne 21; Rebs: Cady Lalanne 10; Asts: Marcus Georges-Hunt 3		Pts: Ali Haidar 33; Rebs: Ali Haidar 13; Asts: Michael Dixon 5

Al-Ittihad Hall, Kuwait City, Kuwait

=== Third place game ===
15 October 2022
16:15

Report

Beirut Club (Lebanon)	102–97 (OT)	(Kuwait) Kazma
Scoring by quarter: 19–23, 25–23, 21–26, 20–13, Overtime: 17–12
Pts: Omar Jamaleddine 33; Rebs: Omar Jamaleddine 14; Asts: Michael Dixon 6		Pts: Latavious Williams 34; Rebs: Latavious Williams 15; Asts: Abdulaziz Alhumaidi 8

Al-Ittihad Hall, Kuwait City, Kuwait

=== Final ===
15 October 2022
18:30

Report

Kuwait	78–77	(Egypt) Al Ahly Cairo
Pts: Marcus Georges-Hunt 22; Rebs: Lalanne, Adnan 10; Asts: Hamad Adnan 4		Pts: Amr Gendy 18; Rebs: Michael Fakuade 10; Asts: Walter Hodge 5

Al-Ittihad Hall, Kuwait City, Kuwait

== Statistical leaders ==
Category	Player	Team(s)	Statistic
Points per game	(United States) Kevin Murphy	(Kuwait) Kazma	28.6
Rebounds per game	(United States) Latavious Williams	(Kuwait) Kazma	13.9
Assists per game	(Kuwait) Ahmad Al-Baloushi	(Kuwait) Kazma	7.0
Steals per game	(Syria) Ishaq Oubid	(Syria) Al-Ittihad Aleppo	3.3
Blocks per game	(Tunisia) Salah Mejri	(Kuwait) Al-Jahra	2.6
