= 2023 Arab Club Basketball Championship =

بطولة الأندية العربية لكرة السلة 2023

Tournament details
- Country: Qatar
- Dates: 2 – 12 October 2023
- Teams: 18

Final positions
- Champions: (Lebanon) Beirut Club (1st title)
- Runners-up: (Morocco) AS Salé
- Third place: Kuwait Club
- Fourth place: (Egypt) Al Ahly Cairo

Tournament statistics
- Scoring leader(s): Ilias Aqboub (AS Salé)

Awards
- MVP: Sergio El Darwich (Beirut Club)

The 2023 Arab Club Basketball Championship (Arabic: بطولة الأندية العربية لكرة السلة 2023) was the 35th season of the Arab Club Basketball Championship. The tournament is held from 1 October. All games are played in Doha, Qatar.

Kuwait Club were the defending champions, but were eliminated in the semi-finals by Beirut Club. Beirut Club went on to win their first Arab Championship, after their victory over AS Salé in the final.

== Group phase ==
=== Group A ===
Pos	Team	Pld	W	L	GF	GA	GD	Pts	Qualification
1	Kuwait Club	3	3	0	271	199	+72	6	Advance to knock-out phase
2	(Bahrain) Al-Muharraq	3	2	1	245	232	+13	5	Advance to knock-out phase
3	Qatar Club	3	1	2	205	226	−21	4	Advance to knock-out phase
4	(Palestine) Al-Bureij	3	0	3	240	304	−64	3	Advance to knock-out phase

Source: Asia-basket.com

=== Group B ===
Pos	Team	Pld	W	L	GF	GA	GD	Pts	Qualification
1	(Egypt) Al Ittihad Alexandria	4	4	0	413	247	+166	8	Advance to knock-out phase
2	(Algeria) USM Alger	4	3	1	294	267	+27	7	Advance to knock-out phase
3	Dynamo Lebanon	4	2	2	344	304	+40	6	Advance to knock-out phase
4	(Oman) Al-Seeb	4	1	3	254	336	−82	5	Advance to knock-out phase
5	(Qatar) Al Ahli Doha	4	0	4	227	378	−151	4	

Source: Asia-basket.com

October 1, 2023
15:30

Boxscore

USM Alger (Algeria)	81–57	(Oman) Al-Seeb Club
Scoring by quarter: 17-13, 18-8, 23-18, 23-18
Pts: Zaki Guzout 14; Rebs: Omar Belliche 13; Asts: Abdesslem Dekkiche 6		Pts: Brice Johnson 23; Rebs: Walim Jossief 8 Asts: Four players 1

Al Gharafa Sports Club Hall, Doha, Qatar

October 2, 2023
16:30

Boxscore

Al Ittihad Alexandria (Egypt)	89–53	(Algeria) USM Alger
Scoring by quarter: 16-11, 27-5, 23-20, 23-17
Pts: Yusuf Shehata 14; Rebs: Manny Harris 8 Asts: Manny Harris 5		Pts: George Williams 19; Rebs: Sidali Benzaime 11; Asts: Abdesslem Dekkiche 3

AlRayyan Sport Hall, Doha, Qatar

October 3, 2023
18:30

Boxscore

USM Alger (Algeria)	83–54	(Qatar) Al Ahli SC
Scoring by quarter: 20-14, 23-16, 18-12, 22-12
Pts: Johnathan Hudson 38; Rebs: Johnathan Hudson 9 Asts: Johnathan Hudson 3		Pts: George Williams 17; Rebs: Two players 8 Asts: George Williams 5

AlRayyan Sport Hall, Doha, Qatar

October 6, 2023
14:00

Boxscore

Dynamo Club (Lebanon)	68–77	(Algeria) USM Alger
Scoring by quarter: 14-18, 20-23, 18-11, 14-25
Pts: Two players 19; Rebs: Omar Jamaledine 10; Asts: Two players 3		Pts: George Williams 25; Rebs: Two players 9 Asts: George Williams 5

Al Gharafa Sports Club Hall, Doha, Qatar

=== Group C ===
Pos	Team	Pld	W	L	GF	GA	GD	Pts	Qualification
1	(Morocco) AS Salé	3	3	0	262	210	+52	6	Advance to knock-out phase
2	(Kuwait) Qadsia	3	2	1	240	210	+30	5	Advance to knock-out phase
3	(Saudi Arabia) Al-Fateh	3	1	2	273	239	+34	4	Advance to knock-out phase
4	(Yemen) Al-Wehda	3	0	3	196	312	−116	3	Advance to knock-out phase

Source: Asia-basket.com

=== Group D ===
Pos	Team	Pld	W	L	GF	GA	GD	Pts	Qualification
1	(Lebanon) Beirut Club	4	4	0	374	301	+73	8	Advance to knock-out phase
2	(Egypt) Al Ahly Cairo	4	3	1	312	282	+30	7	Advance to knock-out phase
3	(Iraq) Dijlah University	4	2	2	340	340	0	6	Advance to knock-out phase
4	(Morocco) MTB Majd Tanger	4	1	3	287	343	−56	5	Advance to knock-out phase
5	(Libya) Al Ittihad Tripoli	4	0	4	281	328	−47	4	

Source: Asia-basket.com

== Knock-out phase ==
Round of 16
Kuwait	90
(Oman) Al-Seeb	49
(Kuwait) Qadsia	90
(Iraq) Dijlah University	94
(Lebanon) Beirut Club	121
(Yemen) Al-Wehda	69
(Algeria) USM Alger (OT)	77
Qatar Club	70
(Egypt) Al Ittihad Alexandria	20
(Palestine) Al Bureij	0
(Egypt) Al Ahly Cairo	98
(Saudi Arabia) Al-Fateh	58
(Morocco) AS Salé	88
(Morocco) MTB Majd Tanger	75
(Bahrain) Al-Muharraq	83
Dynamo Lebanon	79

Quarter-finals
Kuwait	94
(Iraq) Dijlah University	76
(Lebanon) Beirut Club	110
(Algeria) USM Alger	78
(Egypt) Al Ittihad Alexandria	77
(Egypt) Al Ahly Cairo	82
(Morocco) AS Salé	108
(Bahrain) Al-Muharraq	95

Semi-finals
Kuwait	97
(Lebanon) Beirut Club	101
(Egypt) Al Ahly Cairo	78
(Morocco) AS Salé	85

Final
(Lebanon) Beirut Club	86
(Morocco) AS Salé	75
Third place
Kuwait	87
(Egypt) Al Ahly Cairo	84

=== Round of 16 ===
October 8, 2023
12:00

Boxscore

Kuwait	90–49	(Oman) Al-Seeb
Scoring by quarter: 27-12, 23-4, 27-21, 13-12
Pts: Omran Jawhar 17; Rebs: Mohammad Hasan 9 Asts: Mohamed Harat 8		Pts: Brice Johnson 25; Rebs: Two players 5 Asts: Two players 2

Doha, Qatar

October 8, 2023
12:00

Boxscore

Qadsia (Kuwait)	90–94	(Iraq) Dijlah University
Scoring by quarter: 18-12, 16-30, 33-23, 23-29
Pts: Robert Lowery 22; Rebs: Alono Al-Yousef 15; Asts: Robert Lowery 6		Pts: Kenny Hayes 37; Rebs: Jeremiah Wilson 12; Asts: Kenny Hayes 5

Doha, Qatar

October 8, 2023
14:30

Boxscore

AS Salé (Morocco)	88–75	(Morocco) MTB Majd Tanger
Scoring by quarter: 34-19, 9-20, 18-17, 27-19
Pts: Chris Crawford 31; Rebs: Chris Crawford 11; Asts: Ali Lahrichi 5		Pts: Burke Putnam 21; Rebs: Mohamed Chaoui 13; Asts: John Murry 4

Doha, Qatar

October 8, 2023
14:30

Boxscore

Al-Muharraq (Bahrain)	83–79	Dynamo Lebanon
Scoring by quarter: 25-14, 20-23, 19-19, 19-23
Pts: Julius Coles 28; Rebs: Deng Acuoth 13; Asts: Two players 5		Pts: Zach Lofton 32; Rebs: Radhouane Slimane 10; Asts: Two players 3

Doha, Qatar

October 8, 2023
17:00

Boxscore

Beirut Club (Lebanon)	121–69	(Yemen) Al-Wehda
Scoring by quarter: 25-18, 30-14, 37-15, 29-22
Pts: Tony Mitchell 22; Rebs: Mohamed Ochi 16; Asts: Ali Mezher 9		Pts: Mohammed Ezzat 30; Rebs: Mohammed Hussein 8 Asts: Mohammed Ezzat 6

Doha, Qatar

October 8, 2023
17:00

Boxscore

USM Alger (Algeria)	77–70 (OT)	Qatar Club
Scoring by quarter: 15-20, 10-15, 19-14, 18-13, Overtime: 15–8
Pts: George Williams 34; Rebs: George Williams 12; Asts: George Williams 4		Pts: Meho Haracic 29; Rebs: Two players 10; Asts: Two players 3

AlRayyan Sport Hall, Doha, Qatar

October 8, 2023
19:30

Al Ittihad Alexandria (Egypt)	20–00	(Palestine) Al Bureij

Doha, Qatar

October 8, 2023
19:30

Boxscore

Al Ahly Cairo (Egypt)	98–58	(Saudi Arabia) Al-Fateh
Scoring by quarter: 19-12, 22-12, 31-19, 26-15
Pts: Mostafa Kejo 18; Rebs: Seif Samir 9 Asts: Omar Abada 6		Pts: Darko Planinić 20; Rebs: Hani Al-Mohammed 7 Asts: Mohammed Fahad 5

Doha, Qatar

=== Quarter-finals ===
October 9, 2023
12:00

Boxscore

Kuwait	94–76	(Iraq) Dijlah University
Scoring by quarter: 24-15, 27-21, 23-13, 22-25
Pts: Marcus Georges-Hunt 24; Rebs: Mohamed Harat 8 Asts: Hamad Hasan 5		Pts: Kenny Hayes 30; Rebs: Jeremiah Wilson 6 Asts: Kenny Hayes 6

Doha, Qatar

October 9, 2023
14:30

Boxscore

AS Salé (Morocco)	108–95	(Bahrain) Al-Muharraq
Scoring by quarter: 22-21, 31-20, 27-25, 28-29

Doha, Qatar

October 9, 2023
17:00

Boxscore

USM Alger (Algeria)	78–110	(Lebanon) Beirut Club
Scoring by quarter: 17-24, 17-39, 26-22, 18-25
Pts: George Williams 16; Rebs: Two players 5 Asts: Abdesslem Dekkiche 6		Pts: Tony Mitchell 23; Rebs: Three players 6 Asts: Ali Mezher 8

AlRayyan Sport Hall, Doha, Qatar

October 9, 2023
19:30

Boxscore

Al Ittihad Alexandria (Egypt)	77–82	(Egypt) Al Ahly Cairo
Scoring by quarter: 18-19, 17-24, 19-17, 23-22

Doha, Qatar

=== Semi-finals ===
October 11, 2023
15:00

Boxscore

Kuwait	97–101	(Lebanon) Beirut Club
Scoring by quarter: -, -, -, -
Pts: Marcus Georges-Hunt 31; Rebs: Cady Lalanne 10; Asts: Hamad Hasan 2		Pts: Tony Mitchell 31; Rebs: Mohamad Haidar 9 Asts: Ali Mezher 11

Doha, Qatar

October 11, 2023
17:30

Boxscore

Al Ahly Cairo (Egypt)	78–85	(Morocco) AS Salé
Scoring by quarter: 25-17, 17-19, 13-19, 23-30
Pts: Two players 15; Rebs: Three players 7 Asts: Two players 3		Pts: Ramon Galloway 31; Rebs: Chris Crawford 11; Asts: Two players 2

Doha, Qatar

=== Third place ===
October 12, 2023
15:00

Boxscore

Kuwait	87–84	(Egypt) Al Ahly Cairo
Scoring by quarter: -, -, -, -
Pts: Cady Lalanne 34; Rebs: Cady Lalanne 10; Asts: Marcus Georges-Hunt 4		Pts: Omar Oraby 25; Rebs: Omar Oraby 11; Asts: Omar Abada 5

Doha, Qatar

=== Final ===
October 12, 2023
17:00

Boxscore

Beirut Club (Lebanon)	86–75	(Morocco) AS Salé
Scoring by quarter: 25-15, 17-10, 21-27, 23-23
Pts: Sergio El-Darwich 24; Rebs: Tony Mitchell 10; Asts: Ali Mezher 11		Pts: Ramon Galloway 32; Rebs: Ilias Aqboub 9 Asts: Ramon Galloway 5

Doha, Qatar

Starters:			Pts	Reb	Ast
PG	25	(Lebanon) Ali Mezher	12	4	11
SG	35	(Lebanon) Jean-Marc Jarrouge	9	4	1
G/F	91	(Lebanon) Sergio El Darwich	24	5	3
C	45	(United States) Julian Gamble	18	9	0
SF	0	(United States) Tony Mitchell	11	10	3
Reserves:					
PF	11	(Lebanon) Ali Haidar	7	5	1
PG	7	(Lebanon) Hassan Dandach	3	3	1
PF	99	(Tunisia) Mohamed Ochi	2	2	0
C	12	(Lebanon) Naim Rabay	DNP		
SF	15	(Lebanon) Jad Massih	DNP		
PG	8	(Lebanon) Jad Nasr	DNP		
G	10	(Lebanon) Karam Mechref	DNP		
Head coach:
(Lebanese Basketball Federation) Joe Ghattas

Beirut Club	AS Salé

(Lebanon) Beirut Club	Statistics	(Morocco) AS Salé
30/45 (66.7%)	2-pt field goals	20/39 (51.3%)
6/23 (26.1%)	3-pt field goals	9/35 (25.7%)
8/13 (16.5%)	Free throws	8/13 (61.5%)
11	Offensive rebounds	13
31	Defensive rebounds	20
42	Total rebounds	33
20	Assists	13
12	Turnovers	11
4	Steals	7
3	Blocks	2
15	Fouls	15

2023 Arab Club Basketball Championship champions
(Lebanon) Beirut Club
1st Arab Club Basketball Championship title

Starters:			Pts	Reb	Ast
G	55	(United States) Ramon Galloway	32	3	5
G	15	(United States) Chris Crawford	15	7	3
F	12	(Morocco) Ilias Aqboub	10	9	0
PG	5	(Belgium) Yassine El Mahsini	4	3	2
C	21	(Morocco) Khalid Boukichou	9	4	1
Reserves:					
C	6	(Morocco) Soufiane Kourdou	2	1	0
G	9	(Morocco) Ali Lahrichi	2	0	0
	11	(Morocco) Oussama Benabou	0	1	1
PF	23	(Tunisia) Firas Lahyani	1	5	0
	14	(Morocco) Amine El Ouahabi	0	0	1
	3	(Morocco) Bilal Dahhan	DNP		
	32	(Morocco) Wail Habibi	DNP		
Head coach:
(Basketball Federation of Serbia) Željko Zečević
