= Salah Mejri =

Tunisian basketball player (born 1986)

Salah Mejri صالح الماجري
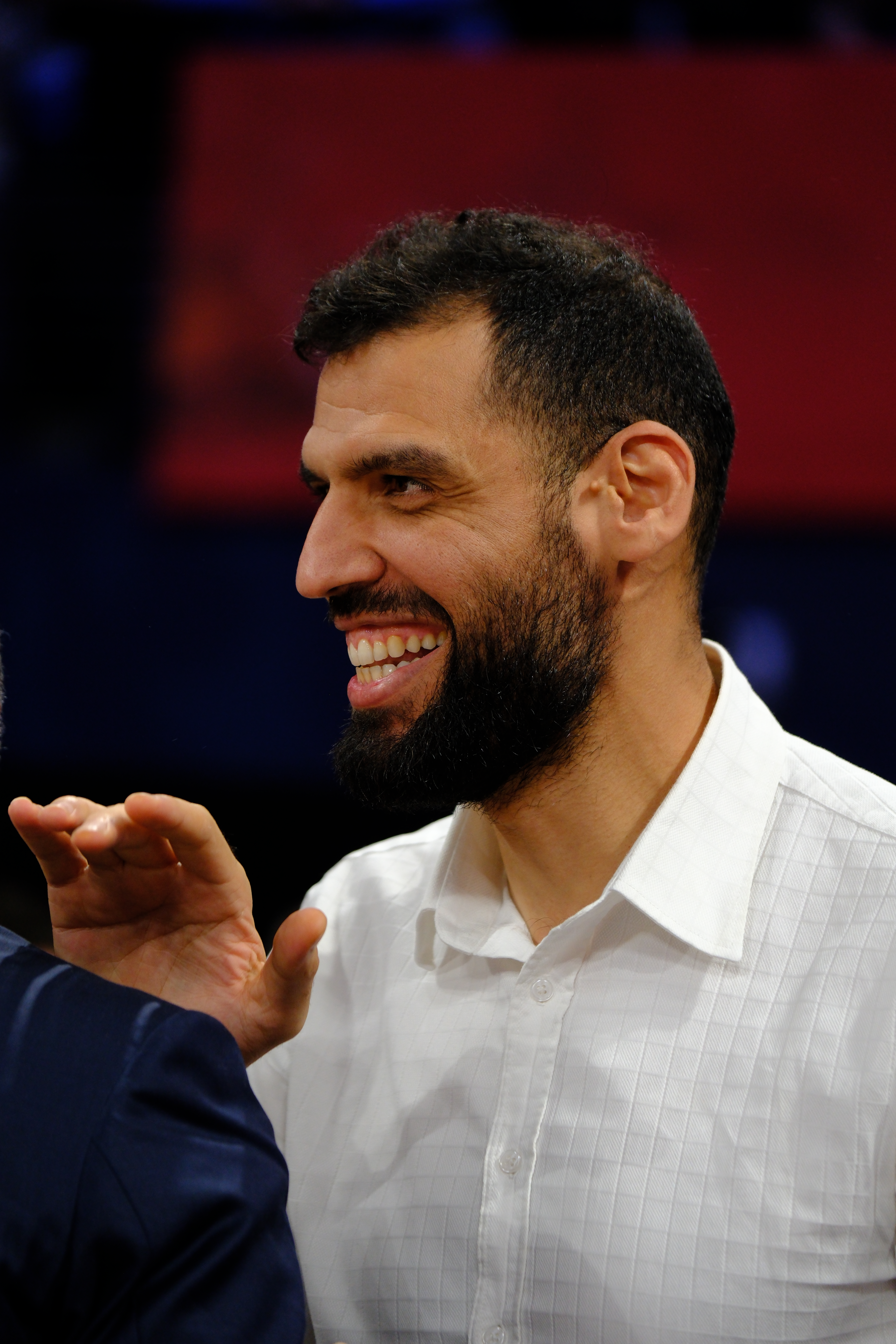
- Mejri in 2025

Personal information
- Born: June 15, 1986 (age 40) Jendouba, Tunisia
- Listed height: 7 ft 2 in (2.18 m)
- Listed weight: 235 lb (107 kg)

Career information
- NBA draft: 2008: undrafted
- Playing career: 2006–2023
- Position: Center
- Number: 50

Career history
- 2006–2010: Étoile Sportive du Sahel
- 2010–2012: Antwerp Giants
- 2012–2013: Obradoiro CAB
- 2013–2015: Real Madrid
- 2015–2019: Dallas Mavericks
- 2015–2016: →Texas Legends
- 2019–2020: Real Madrid
- 2020: Beijing Royal Fighters
- 2021–2022: Al-Jahra
- 2022–2023: Beirut Club
- 2023: Kazma

Career highlights
- EuroLeague champion (2015); Spanish League champion (2015); Spanish League Rising Star (2013); 3× Spanish King's Cup winner (2014, 2015, 2020); 2× Spanish Supercup winner (2013, 2014); FIBA Africa Championship MVP (2011); Lebanese Basketball League Champion (2022)
- Stats at NBA.com
- Stats at Basketball Reference
Medals
Men's basketball
Representing Tunisia
FIBA Africa Championship
Gold medal – first place	2011 Madagascar
Gold medal – first place	2021 Rwanda
Bronze medal – third place	2009 Libya
Bronze medal – third place	2015 Tunisia

Salah Mejri (Arabic: صالح الماجري; born June 15, 1986) is a Tunisian former professional basketball player who represented the senior Tunisian national basketball team internationally. Standing at 7 ft 2 in (2.18 m), he played at the center position. After a successful career in Europe, Mejri was the first (and so far, only) Tunisian NBA player when he joined the Dallas Mavericks in 2015 as a 29-year-old rookie. He stayed in the NBA for four seasons before returning to Real Madrid in the 2019 offseason.

== Professional career ==
=== Early career ===
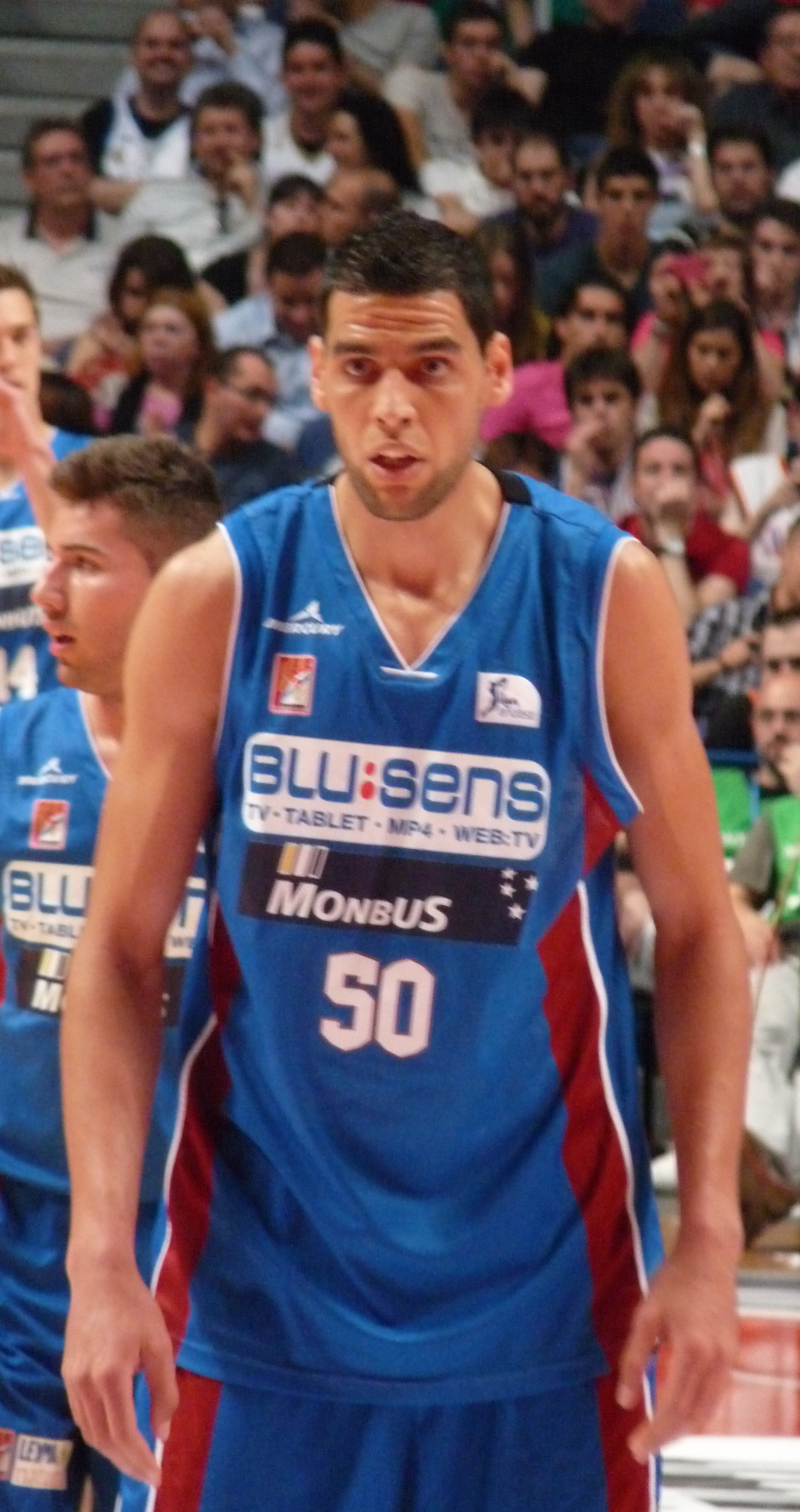
Mejri with Obradoiro in 2013

Mejri started playing basketball at the age of 20 for Étoile Sportive du Sahel in the Tunisian Basketball League. In September 2010, he signed a two-year contract with the Antwerp Giants of the Belgian League, and in August 2012, he moved to the Spanish League to play with Obradoiro CAB. In May 2013, he was named the Spanish League's Rising Star.

=== Real Madrid ===
On July 8, 2013, Mejri signed with the Spanish club Real Madrid. He became the first Tunisian player in the history of Real Madrid and the EuroLeague. In the 2014–15 season, Real Madrid won the EuroLeague championship, after defeating Olympiacos, by a score of 78–59, in the EuroLeague Finals. Real Madrid eventually finished the season by also winning the Spanish League championship, after defeating Barcelona 3–0 in the league's finals series. Real Madrid thus won the triple crown that season.

=== Dallas Mavericks ===
On July 30, 2015, Mejri signed with the NBA's Dallas Mavericks. On October 25, it was announced that Mejri had made the Mavericks' 2015–16 opening-night roster. Three days later, he made his debut for the Mavericks, becoming the first Tunisian to appear in an NBA game. He played in five of the team's first eight games to begin the season, before not playing again until January 13, 2016. With the team's regular starters all rested for their match-up with the Oklahoma City Thunder, Mejri managed 25 minutes off the bench, and recorded 17 points and 9 rebounds in a 108–89 loss to the Thunder. On January 24, with starting center Zaza Pachulia out injured, Mejri made just his eighth appearance for the Mavericks and started in place of Pachulia. In 29 minutes of action, he recorded 10 points, 11 rebounds and 3 blocks in a 115–104 loss to the Houston Rockets. On March 20, he recorded 13 points, 14 rebounds and 6 blocks in 32 minutes off the bench in a 132–120 overtime win over the Portland Trail Blazers. During his rookie season, he received multiple assignments to the Texas Legends, the Mavericks' D-League affiliate.

On June 30, 2016, Mejri underwent arthroscopic surgery for a right knee debridement. On February 1, 2017, he had 16 points and a career-high 17 rebounds in a 113–95 win over the Philadelphia 76ers. He was re-signed by the Mavericks on August 3, 2018, to a one-year-contract. He was waived on February 7, 2019, to open up a roster spot for Zach Randolph who the Mavericks acquired in a trade, but brought back three days later after Randolph was waived.

=== Return to Real Madrid ===
On October 10, 2019, Mejri returned to Spanish EuroLeague club Real Madrid for the rest of the season. He did not play in the ACB final tournament and was replaced by Juan Nunez.

=== China ===
In September 2020, Mejri signed a one-year contract with Beijing Royal Fighters.

=== Kuwait ===
On September 16, 2021, Mejri signed in Kuwait with Al-Jahra of the Kuwaiti Division I Basketball League.

=== Beirut Club ===
On April 14, 2022, Mejri signed in Lebanon for Beirut Club of the Lebanese Basketball League.

=== Kazma ===
In March 2023, Mejri made his debut for Kazma of Kuwait in the West Asia Super League (WASL), recording 19 points and 17 rebounds in a win over Shabab Al Ahli. On 9 February 2024, Mejri announced his retirement from professional basketball.

== Career statistics ==
Legend
GP	Games played	GS	Games started	MPG	Minutes per game
FG%	Field-goal percentage	3P%	3-point field-goal percentage	FT%	Free-throw percentage
RPG	Rebounds per game	APG	Assists per game	SPG	Steals per game
BPG	Blocks per game	PPG	Points per game	PIR	Performance index rating
**Bold**	Career high

=== NBA ===
==== Regular season ====
Year	Team	GP	GS	MPG	FG%	3P%	FT%	RPG	APG	SPG	BPG	PPG
2015–16	Dallas		6	11.7	.628	.000	.587	3.6	.3	.2	1.1	3.7
2016–17	Dallas	**73**	**11**	**12.4**	.642	.333	.590	**4.2**	.2	.4	.8	2.9
2017–18	Dallas	61	1	12.0	.642	.000	.576	4.0	.6	.4	1.1	3.5
2018–19	Dallas	36	4	11.1	.491	**.324**	.625	3.6	**1.0**	.3	.7	**3.9**
Career		204	22	11.9	.603	.293	.590	4.0	.5	.4	.9	3.4

=== Playoffs ===
Year	Team	GP	GS	MPG	FG%	3P%	FT%	RPG	APG	SPG	BPG	PPG
2016	Dallas	4	1	19.0	.700	.000	.417	3.3	.3	.8	1.3	4.8
Career		4	1	19.0	.700	.000	.417	3.3	.3	.8	1.3	4.8

=== EuroLeague ===
†	Denotes seasons in which Mejri won the EuroLeague

Year	Team	GP	GS	MPG	FG%	3P%	FT%	RPG	APG	SPG	BPG	PPG	PIR
2013–14	Real Madrid	**26**	**2**	**10.1**	**.603**	**.667**	.545	**2.9**	**.1**	.4	**1.1**	3.5	**5.6**
2014–15†	Real Madrid	9	0	9.6	.600	.000	.476	2.3	**.1**	**.4**	**.8**	**4.4**	4.8
2019–20	Real Madrid	6	0	5.0	.500	.000	**1.000**	1.2	.2	—	.2	1.0	1.7
Career		41	2	9.3	.598	.400	.533	2.5	.1	.4	.9	3.3	4.9

== National team career ==
Mejri is a member of the senior men's Tunisian national basketball team. He played center for the team in the 2009 FIBA Africa Championship, and helped the team to the bronze medal, and its first-ever trip to the FIBA World Cup.

In 2011, Mejri was named MVP, as Tunisia won the 2011 FIBA Africa Championship, and received an invitation to the 2012 Summer Olympics in London. There, the team finished 0–5; however, he led all competitors in blocked shots, with 17, despite only playing in 5 matches (some teams played in as many as 8 matches).

== Awards and Individual Honors ==
- MVP of AfroBasket 2011
- Named in the All-Star Five (Center) of AfroBasket 2011
- Best Shot Blocker of AfroBasket 2011
