= Kevin Murphy (basketball) =

American basketball player (born 1990)

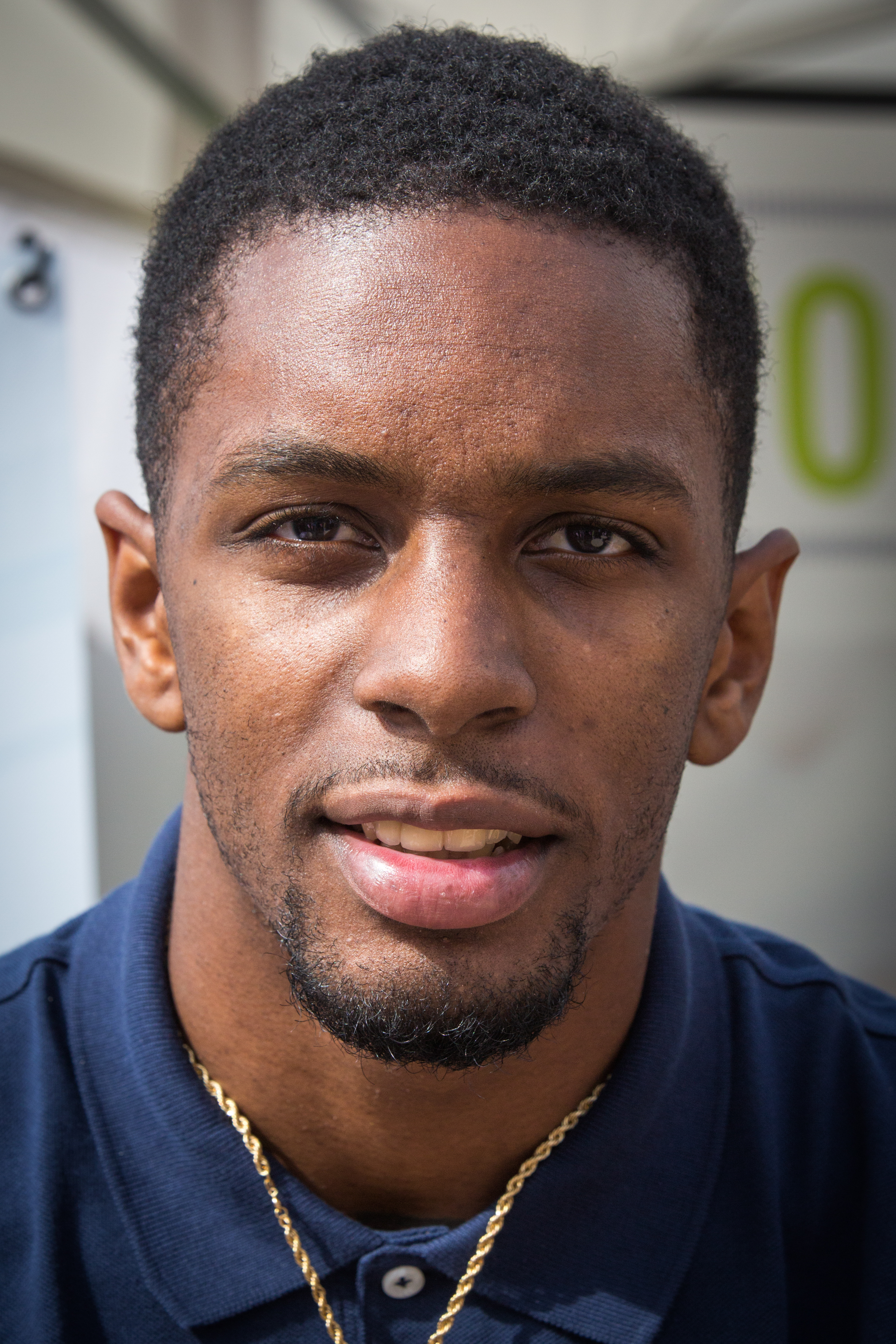
- Murphy with SIG Strasbourg in 2013

No. 33 – Al Ahly
- Position: Shooting guard
- League: BAL

Personal information
- Born: March 6, 1990 (age 36) Atlanta, Georgia, U.S.
- Listed height: 6 ft 5 in (1.96 m)
- Listed weight: 185 lb (84 kg)

Career information
- High school: Creekside (Fairburn, Georgia)
- College: Tennessee Tech (2008–2012)
- NBA draft: 2012: 2nd round, 47th overall pick
- Drafted by: Utah Jazz
- Playing career: 2012–present

Career history
- 2012–2013: Utah Jazz
- 2012–2013: →Reno Bighorns
- 2013: SIG Strasbourg
- 2014: Idaho Stampede
- 2015: Zhejiang Lions
- 2015: Idaho Stampede
- 2015: Grand Rapids Drive
- 2015–2016: Hitachi SunRockers
- 2016–2017: Grand Rapids Drive
- 2017: Guangxi Rhinos
- 2017–2018: Cedevita
- 2018: San Miguel Beermen
- 2019: Al-Muharraq
- 2019: Shabab Al Ahli
- 2019: Al-Muharraq
- 2020–2021: Al Arabi SC
- 2021–2022: NBA G League Ignite
- 2022–2023: Kazma
- 2023: NorthPort Batang Pier
- 2023: Al Riyadi Club Beirut
- 2023–2024: Al-Ittihad Jeddah
- 2024: Al Ahly Ly
- 2024: Al Ahli Tripoli
- 2025: CS Antonine
- 2025–2026: Sagesse SC
- 2026–present: Al Ahly Cairo

Career highlights
- Bahrain League champion (2019); Bahrain League Finals MVP (2019); All-Bahrain League Second Team (2019); Bahrain League All-Imports Team (2019); FIBA Asia Champions Cup Leading Scorer (2019); FIBA Asia Champions Cup All-Star (2019); FIBA Asia Champions Cup First Team (2019); Croatian League champion (2018); Croatian Cup champion (2018); ABA League Supercup winner (2017); All-NBA D-League First Team (2014); 2× First-team All-OVC (2011, 2012); OVC All-Newcomer Team (2009)
- Stats at NBA.com
- Stats at Basketball Reference

Kevin Marquis Murphy (born March 6, 1990) is an American professional basketball player for Al Ahly Cairo of the Basketball Africa League (BAL). He played college basketball for the Tennessee Tech Golden Eagles.

== High school career ==
Born in Atlanta, Murphy earned four varsity letters in basketball at Creekside High School in Fairburn, Georgia. In his senior season at Creekside High School, Murphy averaged 26 points, 8 rebounds and 3 assists per game.

== College career ==
=== Freshman season ===
In his freshman season at Tennessee Tech, Murphy averaged 9.6 points, 2.9 rebounds, and 1.8 assists per game.

=== Sophomore season ===
As a sophomore, Murphy averaged 15.3 points per game, 3.9 rebounds, and 2.0 assists per game. He was awarded the Best Offensive Player Award by head coach Mike Sutton.

=== Junior season ===
In his junior year, Murphy averaged 17.0 points, 4.5 rebounds, and 1.7 assists per game. In the Ohio Valley Conference men's basketball tournament, Murphy averaged 24.3 points per game and was named to the All-Tournament Team. Murphy was also an All-OVC first team selection.

=== Senior season ===
On January 30, 2012, Murphy scored 50 points in a win over SIU Edwardsville, the most for any Division I player in the 2011-12 NCAA Division I men's basketball season. Murphy averaged 20.6 points, 5.2 rebounds, and 2.3 assists per game during the season. He was also named to the OVC All-Tournament Team and the All-OVC first team for the second consecutive year. Following the season, Murphy participated in the Portsmouth Invitational Tournament. He was named to the All-Tournament Team.

== Professional career ==
Murphy was selected with the 47th overall pick in the 2012 NBA draft by the Utah Jazz. He joined the Jazz for the 2012 NBA Summer League. On November 26, 2012, Murphy was assigned to the Reno Bighorns of the NBA D-League. On January 8, 2013, the Jazz recalled him from the D-League. On July 10, 2013, Murphy was involved in a three-team trade that sent him and Andre Iguodala, then of the Denver Nuggets, to the Golden State Warriors. He joined the Warriors for the 2013 NBA Summer League. On July 24, 2013, Murphy was waived by the Warriors.

On August 11, 2013, he signed with Strasbourg IG of France. On December 25, 2013, he left Strasbourg. On January 4, 2014, he was acquired by the Idaho Stampede.

On August 27, 2014, he signed with the Utah Jazz. However, he was later waived by the Jazz on October 10, 2014. On November 3, 2014, he was reacquired by the Idaho Stampede. On December 30, 2014, he left the Stampede after appearing in 15 games. On January 2, 2015, he signed with the Zhejiang Lions of the Chinese Basketball Association. Following the conclusion of the CBA season, he returned to the United States, and on February 19, he was reacquired by the Stampede. On February 26, he was traded to the Grand Rapids Drive in exchange for Brandon Fields.

On November 8, 2015, Murphy signed with the Hitachi SunRockers of the Japan Basketball League.

On September 8, 2016, Murphy signed with the Orlando Magic. However, he was later waived by the Magic on October 16 after appearing in two preseason games. On November 17, 2016, Murphy was reacquired by the Grand Rapids Drive.

On April 22, 2017, Murphy signed with Guangxi Rhinos of the Chinese National Basketball League. On July 19, 2017, Murphy scored a career-high 67 points to go along with 6 rebounds in a 118–132 loss to the Lhasa Pure Land.

On August 5, 2017, Murphy signed with Croatian club Cedevita Zagreb. On January 20, 2018, he parted ways with Cedevita. On September 26, 2018, Murphy signed with the San Miguel Beermen of the Philippine Basketball Association (PBA).

In 2022, Kevin Murphy was named the Season 5 BIG3 MVP.

In October 2022, Murphy played for Kuwaiti club Kazma in the 2022 Arab Club Basketball Championship. On October 12, in the quarterfinals, he scored 53 points in a 106–101 overtime win over Al Ittihad Alexandria.

In February 2023, Murphy returned to the Philippines, this time signing with the NorthPort Batang Pier to replace Marcus Weathers as the team's import for the 2023 PBA Governors' Cup.

In February 2024, Murphy joined Al Ahly Ly. On April 19, 2024, Murphy made his debut for Al Ahly Ly in the Basketball Africa League (BAL). He had 21 points, 5 rebounds and 6 assists in their opening day win over Bangui Sporting Club.

In October 2024, Murphy joined another Libyan club in Al Ahli Tripoli, for the 2025 BAL qualification. On November 9, 2024, he scored 34 points in the decisive victory of Tripoli over the ABC Fighters, which clinched the team's first BAL participation in club history.

== Career statistics ==
Legend
GP	Games played	GS	Games started	MPG	Minutes per game
FG%	Field goal percentage	3P%	3-point field goal percentage	FT%	Free throw percentage
RPG	Rebounds per game	APG	Assists per game	SPG	Steals per game
BPG	Blocks per game	PPG	Points per game	**Bold**	Career high

=== NBA ===
Year	Team	GP	GS	MPG	FG%	3P%	FT%	RPG	APG	SPG	BPG	PPG
2012–13	Utah	17	0	3.1	.250	.200	–	.2	.1	.1	.0	.9
Career		17	0	3.1	.250	.200	–	.2	.1	.1	.0	.9

=== College ===
Year	Team	GP	GS	MPG	FG%	3P%	FT%	RPG	APG	SPG	BPG	PPG
2008–09	Tennessee Tech	30	19	20.3	.383	**.418**	.720	2.9	1.6	.6	**.2**	9.6
2009–10	Tennessee Tech	32	30	31.3	.442	.306	**.755**	3.9	2.1	.7	.1	15.3
2010–11	Tennessee Tech	**33**	28	29.3	**.478**	.333	.735	4.5	1.8	**1.0**	**.2**	17.0
2011–12	Tennessee Tech	**33**	**32**	**34.5**	.444	.416	.721	**5.2**	**2.3**	.8	**.2**	**20.6**
Career		128	109	29.0	.443	.372	.734	4.2	1.9	.8	.2	15.8
