= 2021 Arab Club Basketball Championship =

33rd season of the Arab Club Basketball Championship

أفضل لاعب في البطولة العربية للأندية لكرة السلة 2021

Tournament details
- Country: Egypt
- Dates: 29 September – 9 October 2021
- Teams: 18

Final positions
- Champions: (Egypt) Al Ahly (1st title)
- Runners-up: Kuwait
- Third place: (Tunisia) Ezzahra Sports
- Fourth place: (Egypt) Al Ittihad Alexandria

Awards
- MVP: (Egypt) Ehab Amin (Al Ahly)

The 2021 Arab Club Basketball Championship (Arabic: أفضل لاعب في البطولة العربية للأندية لكرة السلة 2021) was the 33rd season of the Arab Club Basketball Championship. The tournament started on 29 September 2021 and ended on 9 October 2021. The entire tournament was held in Alexandria, Egypt, as all games were played in the Hall Al Ettehad Al Sakandary Club or in the Borj Al Arab Hall.

Al Ittihad Alexandria was the defending champion. Al Ahly Cairo won its first Arab championship.

== Regular season ==
The draw for the groups was held 20 September 2021.

=== Group A ===
Pos	Team	Pld	W	L	PF	PA	PD	Pts	Qualification
1	(Egypt) Al Ittihad Alexandria (H)	3	3	0	298	209	+89	6	Advance to playoffs
2	(Morocco) FUS Rabat	3	2	1	274	225	+49	5	Advance to playoffs
3	(Algeria) USM Blida	3	1	2	241	247	−6	4	
4	(Iraq) Al-Mina'a	3	0	3	177	303	−126	3	

Source: Asia-Basket.com
(H) Hosts

29 September 2021
FUS Rabat (Morocco)	90–74	(Algeria) USM Blida
Al-Mina'a (Iraq)	46–115	(Egypt) Al Ittihad Alexandria
1 October 2021
Al Ittihad Alexandria (Egypt)	91–81	(Morocco) FUS Rabat
USM Blida (Algeria)	85–65	(Iraq) Al-Mina'a
4 October 2021
Al-Mina'a (Iraq)	66–103	(Morocco) FUS Rabat
Al Ittihad Alexandria (Egypt)	92–82	(Algeria) USM Blida

=== Group B ===
Pos	Team	Pld	W	L	PF	PA	PD	Pts	Qualification
1	(Tunisia) Ezzahra Sports	4	4	0	376	233	+143	8	Advance to playoffs
2	(Qatar) Al-Wakrah	4	3	1	283	255	+28	7	Advance to playoffs
3	(United Arab Emirates) Sharjah	3	1	2	247	212	+35	4	
4	(Kuwait) Al Yarmook	3	1	2	229	230	−1	4	
5	(Sudan) Alyounany	3	0	3	182	387	−205	3	

Updated to match(es) played on 6 October 2021. Source: Asia-Basket.com

29 September 2021
Ezzahra Sports (Tunisia)	112–36	(Sudan) Alyounany
Al Yarmook (Kuwait)	58–80	(Qatar) Al-Wakrah
30 September 2021
Alyounany (Sudan)	55–106	(Kuwait) Al Yarmook
Al-Wakrah (Qatar)	78–71	(United Arab Emirates) Sharjah
1 October 2021
Al-Wakrah (Qatar)	74–45	(Sudan) Alyounany
Sharjah (United Arab Emirates)	81–88	(Tunisia) Ezzahra Sports
3 October 2021
Alyounany (Sudan)	46–95	(United Arab Emirates) Sharjah
Al Yarmook (Kuwait)	65–95	(Tunisia) Ezzahra Sports
4 October 2021
Ezzahra Sports (Tunisia)	81–51	(Qatar) Al-Wakrah
Sharjah (United Arab Emirates)		(Kuwait) Al Yarmook

=== Group C ===
Pos	Team	Pld	W	L	PF	PA	PD	Pts	Qualification
1	(Egypt) Al Ahly	3	3	0	274	195	+79	6	Advance to playoffs
2	(Algeria) WA Boufarik	3	2	1	225	209	+16	5	Advance to playoffs
3	(Saudi Arabia) Al-Fateh	3	1	2	241	237	+4	4	
4	(Yemen) Shaa'b Hadramaut	3	0	3	220	319	−99	3	

Source: Asia-Basket.com

30 September 2021
Shaa'b Hadramaut (Yemen)	69–124	(Egypt) Al Ahly
WA Boufarik (Algeria)	75–70	(Saudi Arabia) Al-Fateh
3 October 2021
Al-Fateh (Saudi Arabia)	94–80	(Yemen) Shaa'b Hadramaut
Al Ahly (Egypt)	68–49	(Algeria) WA Boufarik
4 October 2021
Shaa'b Hadramaut (Yemen)	71–101	(Algeria) WA Boufarik
Al-Fateh (Saudi Arabia)	77–82	(Egypt) Al Ahly

=== Group D ===
Pos	Team	Pld	W	L	PF	PA	PD	Pts	Qualification
1	Kuwait	4	4	0	391	309	+82	8	Advance to playoffs
2	(Lebanon) Beirut Club	4	3	1	350	314	+36	7	Advance to playoffs
3	(Qatar) Al-Gharafa	4	1	3	322	354	−32	5	
4	(United Arab Emirates) Al Bataeh	4	1	3	269	342	−73	5	
5	(Bahrain) Manama	4	1	3	366	379	−13	5	

Source: Asia-Basket.com

30 September 2021
Kuwait	112–60	(United Arab Emirates) Al Bataeh
Al-Gharafa (Qatar)	125–113	(Bahrain) Manama
1 October 2021
Al Bataeh (United Arab Emirates)	69–88	(Lebanon) Beirut Club
Manama (Bahrain)	90–93	Kuwait
2 October 2021
Beirut Club (Lebanon)	73–71	(Qatar) Al-Gharafa
Manama (Bahrain)	62–75	(United Arab Emirates) Al Bataeh
3 October 2021
Manama (Bahrain)	88–89	(Lebanon) Beirut Club
Kuwait	90–69	(Qatar) Al-Gharafa
4 October 2021
Al-Gharafa (Qatar)	67–78	(United Arab Emirates) Al Bataeh
Beirut Club (Lebanon)	90–96	Kuwait

== Playoffs ==
The playoffs are played in a single-elimination format and began on 6 October and ended on 9 October 2022.

Quarter-finals
6 October
(Egypt) Al Ittihad Alexandria	76
(Qatar) Al-Wakrah	67
6 October
(Egypt) Al Ahly	84
(Lebanon) Beirut Club	82
6 October
(Morocco) FUS Rabat	80
(Tunisia) Ezzahra Sports	82
6 October
Kuwait	98
(Algeria) WA Boufarik	77

Semi-finals
8 October
(Egypt) Al Ittihad Alexandria	73
(Egypt) Al Ahly	78
8 October
(Tunisia) Ezzahra Sports	80
Kuwait	83

Final
9 October
(Egypt) Al Ahly	78
Kuwait	66
Third place
9 October
(Tunisia) Ezzahra Sports	78
(Egypt) Al Ittihad Alexandria	73

=== Final ===
9 October 2021	Al Ahly (Egypt)	78–66	Kuwait	Alexandria
	Scoring by quarter: 20–23, 13–13, 30–13, 15–3
	Pts: Michael Thompson 21	Report	Pts: Elmedin Kikanović 22

== Individual awards ==
Category	Player	Team(s)	Ref.
Most Valuable Player	Ehab Amin	Al Ahly	
Top Scorer	Ziyed Channoufi	Ezzahra Sports	
Best Three-point Shooter	Alexander Algheis	Kuwait	
All-league Team	Mido Taha	Al Ittihad Alexandria	
All-league Team	Jawahar Jawadi	Ezzahra Sports	
All-league Team	Ehab Amin	Al Ahly	
All-league Team	Ali Hadhoud	Kuwait	
All-league Team	Bebo	Al Ittihad Alexandria	
