= Latavious Williams =

American basketball player (born 1989)

No. 2 – Al-Ittihad Jeddah
- Position: Center
- League: SBL

Personal information
- Born: March 29, 1989 (age 37) Starkville, Mississippi, U.S.
- Listed height: 6 ft 8 in (2.03 m)
- Listed weight: 230 lb (104 kg)

Career information
- High school: Starkville (Starkville, Mississippi); Christian Life Center Academy (Humble, Texas)
- NBA draft: 2010: 2nd round, 48th overall pick
- Drafted by: Miami Heat
- Playing career: 2009–present

Career history
- 2009–2011: Tulsa 66ers
- 2011–2012: Joventut
- 2012: Metros de Santiago
- 2012: Brose Bamberg
- 2012–2014: Sevilla
- 2014: Metros de Santiago
- 2014–2015: Bilbao
- 2015: Vaqueros de Bayamón
- 2015–2017: UNICS
- 2017: Bucaneros de La Guaira
- 2017–2018: Valencia
- 2018–2019: Igokea
- 2019: Zaragoza
- 2019: Hapoel Holon
- 2019–2020: Hapoel Tel Aviv
- 2020–2021: Anyang KGC
- 2021–2022: Jeonju KCC Egis
- 2022–2023: Kazma
- 2023–present: Al-Ittihad Jeddah

Career highlights
- Bosnian Cup winner (2019); 2× ACB Most Spectacular Player (2012, 2015)
- Stats at Basketball Reference

Latavious Williams (born March 29, 1989) is an American professional basketball player for Al-Ittihad Jeddah of the Saudi Basketball League (SBL).

After graduating from high school, he played with the Tulsa 66ers of the NBA Development League before being drafted by the Miami Heat with the 48th pick in the 2010 NBA draft. After the draft, his draft rights were immediately traded to the Oklahoma City Thunder, the NBA affiliate of the 66ers. However, the Thunder did not sign him to a contract and Williams returned to the D-League with the 66ers.

Williams was the first player ever to skip college basketball and play a year in the D-League before getting drafted in the NBA. He was also the first player ever to enter into the D-League directly from high school. Williams was, however, the second player to be drafted while playing for a D-League team, as Mike Taylor ended up being drafted two years earlier in 2008. As of April 2022, Williams has never played a competitive game (regular season or playoff) in the NBA, being one of two D-League draftees to hold such claim (the other being Chukwudiebere Maduabum).

== Early life ==
Williams was born to Fredrick and Cassandra Neely in Starkville, Mississippi.

=== High school ===
Williams played four years at Starkville High School. In his last year at Starkville, he averaged 19.9 points, 14.5 rebounds and 5.0 blocks and led Starkville to the Class 5A state semi-finals. After four years in Starkville, he had completed only 2 of the 16 core courses that the National Collegiate Athletic Association (NCAA) requires for eligibility for an athletic scholarship. He then attended Christian Life Center Academy, a private school in Humble, Texas, for a year to complete the 14 other core courses he needed. He continued to play on prep level and averaged 23 points, 12 rebounds, 2 blocks, 4 assists and 4 steals for the Christian Life Center Academy.

=== College plans ===
After finishing his high school education, Williams intended to play college basketball. He was ranked as one of the top 20 recruits in the 2009 class. In May 2009, he announced his verbal commitment to attend the University of Memphis. He chose Memphis ahead of Georgetown, Kansas State and Florida International. He became Josh Pastner's first recruit as the Memphis Tigers head coach. However, he struggled to qualify academically and later backed out from his commitment to play for Memphis and instead skipped college basketball altogether to play professionally. However, a player who attended high school in the United States is not eligible to enter the NBA draft until a year after his high school graduation. He was expected to sign with an overseas team before entering the NBA when he became eligible, a similar path taken by Brandon Jennings who played in the Italian league for a year before he was drafted in 2009.

== Professional career ==
=== 2009–10 season ===
Williams receive several offers from overseas teams, including an offer from the Chinese Basketball Association which were reportedly worth US$100,000. However, his family decided against the idea of playing overseas. He opted to play in the D-League, the NBA's official minor league organization. He chose to earn US$19,000 in the D-League because he believed that he would receive more exposure and experience. He was drafted 16th overall by the Tulsa 66ers in the 2009 NBA D-League draft. He became the first player ever selected in the D-League Draft directly from high school. Because the NBA requires a player to be one year out of high school to play in the league, he became the only D-League player who could not be called up by any of the NBA teams in the 2009–10 season.

He played as the 66ers backup forward for most of the season, starting only 7 out of 46 games in the regular season. He averaged 7.7 points on 52.8 percent shooting and 7.7 rebounds in 20.5 minutes per game. He scored in double figures 16 times and recorded double-figure rebounds in 13 games during the regular season. He also recorded 9 double-doubles in the regular season. He improved his production in the postseason, averaging 11.3 points on 61.2 percent shooting and 8.0 rebounds in seven postseason games. He helped the 66ers advanced to the Finals but they failed to win the championship despite Williams averaging 13.5 points and 10.5 rebounds in the two finals games against Rio Grande Valley Vipers.

=== 2010–11 season ===
Williams was automatically eligible for the 2010 NBA draft as he was already one year removed from his high school graduation. He was drafted by the Miami Heat in the second round with the 48th pick. He became the first player ever to skip college basketball and play a year in the D-League before getting drafted in the NBA. He also became the second player to be drafted from a D-League team to the NBA, after Mike Taylor in 2008. Shortly after being drafted by the Heat, his draft rights were traded to the Oklahoma City Thunder, the NBA team affiliated with the Tulsa 66ers, in exchange for a future second-round pick.

He played for the Thunder in the 2010 Orlando Summer League. He played in all five games, averaging 3.2 points and 2.6 rebounds in 13.0 minutes per game. His best game came during the win against the Philadelphia 76ers when he scored 10 points, with 5 rebounds, and 3 blocked shots in 15 minutes off the bench. However, he didn't receive a contract offer or an invitation to the Thunder's training camp for the 2010–11 season.

On October 31, 2010, the Tulsa 66ers announced that Williams would be returning to the team for the 2010–11 season. His rights in the NBA were still held by the Thunder. He went on to average 13.2 points and 8.6 rebounds in 41 games.

=== 2011–12 season ===
On August 23, 2011, Williams signed a one-year contract with Spanish team FIATC Joventut. At the end of the regular season, he earned Most Spectacular Player honors.

Williams was also candidate for the ACB Rising Star Award after averaging 9.6 points and 7.1 rebounds.

=== 2012–13 season ===
In July 2012, Williams re-joined the Oklahoma City Thunder for the 2012 NBA Summer League. He then joined Metros de Santiago of the Dominican Republic for s short stint before signing a two-month contract with German League and EuroLeague team Brose Baskets on October 4. His contract was not extended after it ended in December 2012. He then signed with Cajasol Sevilla of Spain for the rest of the season.

=== 2013–14 season ===
Williams returned to Cajasol Sevilla for the 2013–14 season but last just 10 games before being released in January 2014.

=== 2014–15 season ===
After serving out another short stint with Metros de Santiago, Williams signed with Bilbao Basket of Spain for the 2014–15 ACB season on August 29.

On June 4, 2015, he signed with Vaqueros de Bayamón of Puerto Rico for the rest of the 2015 BSN season.

=== 2015–16 season ===
On July 20, 2015, Williams signed a one-year deal with UNICS Kazan of Russia.

=== 2016–17 season ===
On June 16, 2016, Williams re-signed with UNICS for one more season.

On June 2, 2017, he signed with Bucaneros de La Guaira of Venezuela for the rest of the 2017 LPB season.

=== 2017–18 season ===
On July 19, 2017, Williams signed with Spanish club Valencia Basket for the 2017–18 season.

=== 2018–19 season ===
On November 1, 2018, Williams signed with Bosnian club Igokea for the 2018–19 season. In 11 ABA League games played for Igokea, he averaged 11.9 points and 4 rebounds per game. Williams won the Bosnian Cup title with Igokea. On April 16, 2019, Williams parted ways with Igokea to join Tecnyconta Zaragoza for the rest of the season.

=== 2019–20 season ===
On August 1, 2019, Williams signed with Hapoel Holon of the Israeli Premier League for the 2019–20 season. On October 5, 2019, Williams recorded a double-double of 23 points and 14 rebounds in his debut, shooting 8-of-11 from the field in an 89–75 win over Hapoel Tel Aviv. On November 26, 2019, he parted ways with Holon.

On November 28, 2019, Williams signed with Hapoel Tel Aviv for the rest of the season. On December 14, 2019, Williams recorded a season-high 25 points, along with 12 rebounds for 41 PIR in an 84–91 loss to Maccabi Tel Aviv.

=== 2020–21 season ===
On June 19, 2020, Williams signed with the Korean team Anyang KGC.

=== 2021–22 season ===
On August 15, 2021, Williams signed with Jeonju KCC Egis.

=== 2022–23 season ===
In October 2022, Williams played for Kazma in the 2022 Arab Club Basketball Championship.

=== 2023–24 season ===
On September 16, 2023, Williams signed with Al-Ittihad Jeddah of the Saudi Basketball League.

=== Draft rights ===
On February 19, 2015, his draft rights were traded from the Thunder to the New Orleans Pelicans. On February 6, 2026, Williams' draft rights were traded to the New York Knicks.

== Career statistics ==
Legend
GP	Games played	GS	Games started	MPG	Minutes per game
FG%	Field goal percentage	3P%	3-point field goal percentage	FT%	Free throw percentage
RPG	Rebounds per game	APG	Assists per game	SPG	Steals per game
BPG	Blocks per game	PPG	Points per game	**Bold**	Career high

=== Domestic leagues ===
Season	Team	League	GP	MPG	FG%	3P%	FT%	RPG	APG	SPG	BPG	PPG
2009–10	Tulsa 66ers	D-League	54	20.0	.560	.071	.634	7.7	.7	.6	.8	8.2
2010–11	Tulsa 66ers	D-League	40	26.2	.640	.000	.724	8.6	.5	.6	.9	13.1
2011–12	FIATC Joventut	ACB	34	24.6	.597	–	.700	7.1	.4	1.3	.8	9.6
2012	Metros de Santiago	Dominican LNB	11	32.3	.620	.333	.843	12.0	1.5	1.4	1.1	16.8
2012–13	Cajasol	ACB	14	23.6	.582	.000	.641	6.4	.5	1.1	.4	10.9
2013–14	Cajasol	ACB	10	27.7	.649	.000	.500	7.7	.7	.5	.4	10.9
2014–15	Bilbao Basket	ACB	36	18.0	.645	–	.623	5.7	.4	.6	.4	7.3
2015	Vaqueros de Bayamón	BSN	10	21.8	.620	.000	.586	8.2	.5	.5	.4	10.5
