= 2018 FIBA Asia Champions Cup qualification =

Qualification for the 2018 FIBA Asia Champions Cup started in 2017 and will end in 2018.

== Background ==
Starting this year, there are a lot of changes in the qualification leading to the main tournament:

- There will be several qualifying rounds spread all across the continent, having the sub-zones scheduled their own qualifiers.
- One unique difference is some of Asia's top professional leagues will have their representatives already seeded in the Final Eight. China's Chinese Basketball Association, South Korea's Korean Basketball League, Japan's B.League and the Philippines' Philippine Basketball Association all have Direct Qualifying Spots to the Final 8.

Already qualified to the main tournament are teams from these leagues:

- (China) Chinese Basketball Association
- (South Korea) Korean Basketball League
- (Japan) B.League
- (Philippines) Philippine Basketball Association

Awaiting results are the West Asia and East Asia Final 8 Qualifiers:

- West Asia qualifier participants (will qualify two spots to the Final 8):
  - (United Arab Emirates) Sharjah Club
  - (Bahrain) Manama Club
  - (Qatar) Al-Arabi
  - (Iran) Petrochimi
  - (Lebanon) Al-Riyadi
  - (Palestine) Sareyyet Ramallah
  - (Kazakhstan) TBD
  - Wild Card Team
- East Asia qualifier participants (will qualify two spots to the Final 8):
  - (Thailand) Mono Vampire
  - (Indonesia) Pelita Jaya
  - (Chinese Taipei) Pauian

== West Asia ==
On March 17, 2018, Petrochimi of Iran avenged their last year's defeat against Al-Riyadi of Lebanon to rule the West Asia Basketball Association (WABA) Champions Cup qualifiers, 83-53, in the Final in Beirut, Lebanon. Joining the finalists is Sareyyet Ramallah of Palestine, which qualified by virtue of their win over Syria's Al-Jaish.

The top three teams are now qualified to the “Road To Final 8 (West Asia)” Round 1.

== Southeast Asia ==
The FIBA Asia Champions Cup SEABA qualifier was held in Nonthaburi, Thailand from 8–10 May 2018.

The competition qualify two club teams from the SEABA sub-zone for the "Road to Final 8 (East Asia)" round of the main tournament.

The two successful SEABA club teams will join club teams from Chinese Taipei and India in the next round, which will qualify one team to the Final 8, joining the group composed of Australia, Japan and the Philippines.

Thailand's Mono Vampire, and Indonesia's Pelita Jaya have qualified for the Round 1 of the FIBA Asia Champions Cup 2018 - Road to Final 8 East Asia after finishing among the top two.

=== Round Robin ===
Pos	Team	Pld	W	L	PF	PA	PD	Pts	Qualification
1	(Thailand) Mono Vampire (H)	3	3	0	254	201	+53	6	Qualification to 2018 FIBA Asia Champions Cup; Road to Final 8 (East Asia) Round 1
2	(Indonesia) Pelita Jaya	3	2	1	260	227	+33	5	Qualification to 2018 FIBA Asia Champions Cup; Road to Final 8 (East Asia) Round 1
3	(Malaysia) Red Baron	3	1	2	232	214	+18	4	
4	(Singapore) Xin Hua Sports Club	3	0	3	158	262	−104	3	

Source: FIBA Asia
(H) Hosts

8 May 2018
15:00

Live Stats

Red Baron (Malaysia)	63–83	(Indonesia) Pelita Jaya
Scoring by quarter: 15–21, 17–19, 22–32, 9–11

Stadium 29, Nonthaburi

8 May 2018
18:00

Live Stats

Mono Vampire (Thailand)	77–40	(Singapore) Xin Hua Sports Club
Scoring by quarter: 10–4, 30–14, 19–7, 18–15

Stadium 29, Nonthaburi

9 May 2018
15:00

Live Stats

Pelita Jaya (Indonesia)	96–70	(Singapore) Xin Hua Sports Club
Scoring by quarter: 33–19, 15–19, 25–21, 23–11

Stadium 29, Nonthaburi

9 May 2018
18:00

Live Stats

Red Baron (Malaysia)	80–83	(Thailand) Mono Vampire
Scoring by quarter: 18–26, 15–27, 16–15, 31–15

Stadium 29, Nonthaburi

10 May 2018
15:00

Live Stats

Xin Hua Sports Club (Singapore)	48–89	(Malaysia) Red Baron
Scoring by quarter: 11–21, 6–22, 23–23, 8–23

Stadium 29, Nonthaburi

10 May 2018
18:00

Live Stats

Mono Vampire (Thailand)	94–81	(Indonesia) Pelita Jaya
Scoring by quarter: 26–23, 34–21, 21–20, 13–17

Stadium 29, Nonthaburi

== Gulf ==
The FIBA Asia Champions Cup GBA qualifier was held in Muscat, Oman from 6–14 May 2018.

The sub-zone qualifier will qualify three teams for the Round 1 of the FIBA Asia Champions Cup, which will determine the identity of the four teams in the “Road To Final 8 (West Asia)”.

Two teams from Qatar, Bahrain, United Arab Emirates and a team each from Saudi Arabia and the hosts Oman participated in the weeklong sub-zone qualifier.

Bahrain's Al Manama, UAE's Sharjah and Qatar's Al-Arabi have qualified for the Round 1 of the FIBA Asia Champions Cup 2018 - Road to Final 8 West Asia after finishing among the top three.

=== Preliminary round ===
==== Group A ====
Pos	Team	Pld	W	L	PF	PA	PD	Pts	Qualification
1	(Bahrain) Al-Muharraq	2	2	0	188	141	+47	4	Advance to quarterfinals
2	(Qatar) Al-Arabi	2	1	1	175	182	−7	3	Advance to quarterfinals
3	(Saudi Arabia) Al-Ittihad	2	0	2	155	195	−40	2	Advance to quarterfinals
4	(United Arab Emirates) Shabab Al-Ahli Dubai (W)	0	0	0	0	0	0	0	

Source: FIBA Asia
(W) Withdrew

6 May 2018
17:00

Live Stats

Al-Ittihad (Saudi Arabia)	73–88	(Bahrain) Al-Muharraq
Scoring by quarter: 20–24, 19–16, 18–32, 16–16

Sultan Qaboos Sports Complex, Muscat

7 May 2018
19:00

Live Stats

Al-Arabi (Qatar)	107–82	(Saudi Arabia) Al-Ittihad
Scoring by quarter: 26–24, 22–20, 27–25, 32–13

Sultan Qaboos Sports Complex, Muscat

10 May 2018
15:00

Live Stats

Al-Muharraq (Bahrain)	100–68	(Qatar) Al-Arabi
Scoring by quarter: 21–16, 29–17, 27–22, 23–13

Sultan Qaboos Sports Complex, Muscat

==== Group B ====
Pos	Team	Pld	W	L	PF	PA	PD	Pts	Qualification
1	(United Arab Emirates) Sharjah Club	3	3	0	273	238	+35	6	Advance to quarterfinals
2	(Bahrain) Manama Club	3	2	1	271	252	+19	5	Advance to quarterfinals
3	(Qatar) Al Rayyan	3	1	2	246	239	+7	4	Advance to quarterfinals
4	(Oman) Nizwa Club	3	0	3	173	234	−61	3	Advance to quarterfinals

Source: FIBA Asia

6 May 2018
19:00

Live Stats

Nizwa Club (Oman)	55–74	(Qatar) Al Rayyan
Scoring by quarter: 4–17, 18–21, 17–12, 16–24

Sultan Qaboos Sports Complex, Muscat

7 May 2018
15:00

Live Stats

Sharjah Club (United Arab Emirates)	105–95	(Bahrain) Manama Club
Scoring by quarter: 29–33, 21–23, 23–28, 32–11

Sultan Qaboos Sports Complex, Muscat

9 May 2018
15:00

Live Stats

Manama Club (Bahrain)	78–54	(Oman) Nizwa Club
Scoring by quarter: 19–19, 18–6, 18–17, 23–12

Sultan Qaboos Sports Complex, Muscat

9 May 2018
17:00

Live Stats

Al Rayyan (Qatar)	79–86	(United Arab Emirates) Sharjah Club
Scoring by quarter: 17–23, 14–27, 23–17, 25–19

Sultan Qaboos Sports Complex, Muscat

10 May 2018
17:00

Live Stats

Nizwa Club (Oman)	64–82	(United Arab Emirates) Sharjah Club
Scoring by quarter: 17–23, 15–15, 17–22, 15–22

Sultan Qaboos Sports Complex, Muscat

10 May 2018
19:00

Live Stats

Manama Club (Bahrain)	98–93	(Qatar) Al Rayyan
Scoring by quarter: 22–17, 23–34, 28–18, 25–24

Sultan Qaboos Sports Complex, Muscat

=== Final round ===
Quarterfinals
11 May
(Bahrain) Al-Muharraq	87
(Oman) Nizwa Club	72
11 May
(Saudi Arabia) Al-Ittihad	76
(Bahrain) Manama Club	93
11 May
(Qatar) Al-Arabi	74
(Qatar) Al Rayyan	67
11 May
BYE
(United Arab Emirates) Sharjah Club

Semifinals
13 May
(Bahrain) Al-Muharraq	82
(Bahrain) Manama Club	89
13 May
(Qatar) Al-Arabi	86
(United Arab Emirates) Sharjah Club	90

Final
14 May
(Bahrain) Manama Club	94
(United Arab Emirates) Sharjah Club	99
3rd place
14 May
(Bahrain) Al-Muharraq	70
(Qatar) Al-Arabi	80

==== Quarterfinals ====
11 May 2018
15:00

Live Stats

Al-Muharraq (Bahrain)	87–72	(Oman) Nizwa Club
Scoring by quarter: 14–17, 26–23, 25–26, 22–6

Sultan Qaboos Sports Complex, Muscat

11 May 2018
17:00

Live Stats

Al-Arabi (Qatar)	74–67	(Qatar) Al Rayyan
Scoring by quarter: 24–14, 21–11, 15–22, 14–20

Sultan Qaboos Sports Complex, Muscat

11 May 2018
19:00

Live Stats

Al-Ittihad (Saudi Arabia)	76–93	(Bahrain) Manama Club
Scoring by quarter: 18–22, 20–26, 21–23, 17–22

Sultan Qaboos Sports Complex, Muscat

==== Semifinals ====
13 May 2018
15:00

Live Stats

Al-Muharraq (Bahrain)	82–89	(Bahrain) Manama Club
Scoring by quarter: 20–25, 16–16, 21–28, 25–20

Sultan Qaboos Sports Complex, Muscat

13 May 2018
17:00

Live Stats

Al-Arabi (Qatar)	86–90	(United Arab Emirates) Sharjah Club
Scoring by quarter: 18–23, 20–21, 25–22, 23–24

Sultan Qaboos Sports Complex, Muscat

==== Third place game ====
14 May 2018
15:00

Live Stats

Al-Muharraq (Bahrain)	70–80	(Qatar) Al-Arabi
Scoring by quarter: 19–23, 10–15, 18–25, 23–17

Sultan Qaboos Sports Complex, Muscat

==== Final ====
14 May 2018
17:00

Live Stats

Manama Club (Bahrain)	94–99	(United Arab Emirates) Sharjah Club
Scoring by quarter: 19–25, 28–22, 25–32, 22–20

Sultan Qaboos Sports Complex, Muscat

=== Final standings ===
Qualification to 2018 FIBA Asia Champions Cup; Road to Final 8 (West Asia) Round 1

Rank	Team	Record
1st place, gold medalist(s)	(United Arab Emirates) Sharjah Club	5–0
2nd place, silver medalist(s)	(Bahrain) Manama Club	4–2
3rd place, bronze medalist(s)	(Qatar) Al-Arabi	3–2
4	(Bahrain) Al-Muharraq	3–2
5	(Qatar) Al Rayyan	1–3
6	(Saudi Arabia) Al-Ittihad	0–3
7	(Oman) Nizwa Club	0–4

== East Inter-Sub Zone qualification ==
South Asia will be represented by the best club team from India and they will participate in the FIBA Asia Champions Cup 2018 East Inter-Sub Zone Qualification that will be held in Thailand on 30 July.

East Asia has already three direct spots allocated to the Final 8 (China, Korea, Japan) and Taiwan's Pauian will participate in the FIBA Asia Champions Cup 2018 East Inter-Sub Zone Qualification that will be held in Thailand on 30 July.

=== Participating teams ===
- (Thailand) Mono Vampire
- (Indonesia) Pelita Jaya
- (Chinese Taipei) Pauian

Pos	Team	Pld	W	L	PF	PA	PD	Pts	Qualification
1	(Chinese Taipei) Pauian	2	2	0	179	143	+36	4	Qualification to 2018 FIBA Asia Champions Cup; Road to Final 8 (East Asia) Round 1
2	(Thailand) Mono Vampire (H)	2	1	1	166	150	+16	3	Qualification to 2018 FIBA Asia Champions Cup; Road to Final 8 (East Asia) Round 1
3	(Indonesia) Pelita Jaya	2	0	2	105	157	−52	2	

Source: FIBA Asia
(H) Hosts

30 July 2018
19:20

Live Stats

Pauian (Chinese Taipei)	79–55	(Indonesia) Pelita Jaya
Scoring by quarter: 20–11, 26–11, 20–15, 13–18

Stadium 29, Nonthaburi

31 July 2018
19:20

Live Stats

Mono Vampire (Thailand)	88–100	(Chinese Taipei) Pauian
Scoring by quarter: 17–26, 24–24, 25–18, 22–32

Stadium 29, Nonthaburi

1 August 2018
19:20

Live Stats

Pelita Jaya (Indonesia)	50–78	(Thailand) Mono Vampire
Scoring by quarter: 8–28, 11–19, 9–20, 22–11

Stadium 29, Nonthaburi
