= A. J. English (basketball, born 1992) =

American basketball player

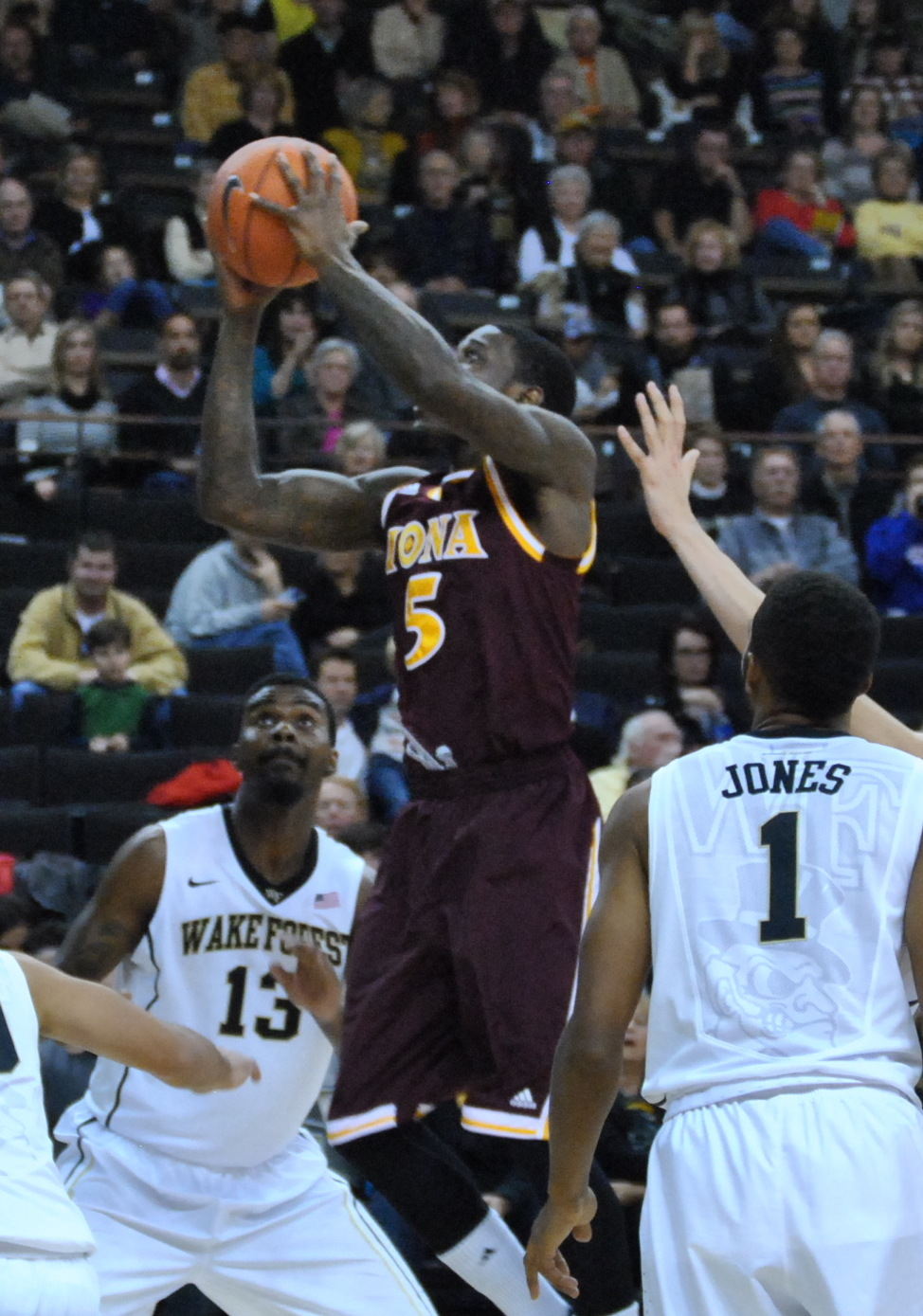
- English with the Iona Gaels in 2014

No. 7 – Sagesse SC
- Position: Point guard / shooting guard
- League: Lebanese Basketball League; WASL

Personal information
- Born: July 10, 1992 (age 34) Wilmington, Delaware
- Listed height: 6 ft 4 in (1.93 m)
- Listed weight: 185 lb (84 kg)

Career information
- High school: Appoquinimink (Middletown, Delaware); St. Thomas More (Oakdale, Connecticut)
- College: Iona (2012–2016)
- NBA draft: 2016: undrafted
- Playing career: 2016–present

Career history
- 2016: Enel Brindisi
- 2016–2017: Fraport Skyliners
- 2017: Limoges CSP
- 2017–2018: Skyliners Frankfurt
- 2018–2019: Lavrio
- 2019–2021: Legia Warszawa
- 2021–2022: Rosa Radom
- 2022: Mitteldeutscher
- 2022–2023: Dijlah University
- 2024: Zastal Zielona Góra
- 2024: M Basket Mažeikiai
- 2025–2026: Beirut Club
- 2026: Zamalek
- 2026–present: Sagesse SC

Career highlights
- 3× First-team All-MAAC (2014–2016)

Albert Jay "A. J." English III (born July 10, 1992) is an American professional basketball player for Sagesse SC of the Lebanese Basketball League and the FIBA West Asia Super League (WASL). He played college basketball for the Iona Gaels.

== High school career ==
The Delaware native played for Appoquinimink High School in Middletown, Delaware, leading the Jaguars to 12–9 (7–5) and 15–5 (12–2) records in his junior and senior seasons, respectively. English then played for St. Thomas More School, averaging nearly 18 points per game in his post-graduate season with the Chancellors, earning All-New England Prep School Athletic Conference Second Team.

== College career ==
English committed to Iona College on April 24, 2012.

English appeared in 17 games as a freshman (six starts) and averaged 7.0 points, 2.5 rebounds, and 1.3 assists in 21.8 minutes per game. Before suffering a season-ending wrist injury, English was named MAAC Rookie of the Week three times.

English surpassed 2,000 points for his career in his last collegiate game, a 94–81 loss to Iowa State in the first round of the 2016 NCAA Tournament.

After finishing his senior season, he led the MAAC in several statistical categories, including Points per game and Assists per game. He went undrafted in the 2016 NBA Draft but was named by Sports Illustrated as one of the 10 best players to not be drafted. He accepted an invitation to play for the Golden State Warriors in the upcoming summer league.

== Professional career ==
On July 20, 2016, English signed with the Italian team Enel Brindisi.

On December 17, 2016, English signed with the German team Fraport Skyliners.

On December 21, 2018, English signed with the Greek team Lavrio.

On November 2, 2019, English signed with Legia Warszawa of the Polish Basketball League.

On April 16, 2021, he has signed with HydroTruck Radom of the Polish Basketball League. English averaged 18.3 points and 3.9 assists per game. On February 23, 2022, he has signed with Mitteldeutscher BC of the Basketball Bundesliga.

In October 2022, he played for Iraqi team Dijlah University Sports Club in the 2022 Arab Club Basketball Championship.

In September 2024, English joined BC Mažeikiai of the Lithuanian Basketball League (LKL) and made his LKL debut against BC Šiauliai on September 29, but the 33 points he scored were not enough to win.

== The Basketball Tournament ==
A.J English played for Gael Nation in the 2018 edition of The Basketball Tournament. In 2 games, he averaged 11.5 points, 5 assists, and 5 rebounds per game. Gael Nation reached the second round before falling to Armored Athlete.

== Personal life ==
English is the son of former NBA player A. J. English.Aj English has 2 children. Two daughters. One the age of 7 Jianna and most recent 1 year old Milani

== See also ==
- List of NCAA Division I men's basketball players with 12 or more 3-point field goals in a game
