= Kuwaiti Division I Basketball League =

Kuwaiti professional basketball league

- Sport: Basketball
- Founded: 1957
- No. of teams: 12
- Country: Kuwait
- Continent: FIBA Asia (Asia)
- Most recent champion: Kuwait SC (15th title) (2024–25)
- Most titles: Kuwait SC (15 titles)
- Feeder to: Basketball Champions League Asia; FIBA West Asia Super League; Arab Club Basketball Championship
- Website: www.asia-basket.com/Kuwait/basketball.asp

The Kuwaiti Division I Basketball League is the highest professional basketball league in Kuwait. The most decorated team in the league is Kuwait SC, who have won fifteen national titles.

== Teams ==
- Al Kuwait SC
- Al Arabi
- Al Jahraa
- Al Nasar
- Al Qadsia
- Al Qurain
- Al Sahel
- Al Salmiyah
- Al Shabab
- Al Sulaibikhat
- Al Tadhamon
- Al Yarmook
- Kazma

== Champions ==
The following teams have won the Division 1 championship:

- 2004: Kuwait SC
- 2012: Kazma
- 2013: Kuwait SC
- 2014: Kuwait SC
- 2015: Kuwait SC
- 2016: Qadsia SC
- 2017: Kuwait SC
- 2020: Kuwait SC
- 2021: Kuwait SC
- 2022: Kuwait SC
- 2023: Kuwait SC
- 2025: Kuwait SC

== Finals and final standings ==
Season	Champions	Runners-up	Finals score	Third place	Ref.
2011–12	Kazma	Kuwait SC	2–1	–	
2012–13	Kuwait SC (8)	Qadsia	League standings	Kazma	
2013–14	Kuwait SC (9)	Qadsia	3–0	–	
2014–15	Kuwait SC (10)	Qadsia	2–1	–	
2015–16	Qadsia (1)	Kuwait SC	Round-robin	Kazma	
2019–20	Kuwait SC (11)	Qadsia	Round-robin	Kazma	
2020–21	Kuwait SC (12)	Kazma	83–61	Qadsia	
2021–22	Kuwait SC (13)	Kazma	3–0	Al-Jahra	
2022–23	Kuwait SC (14)	Kazma	104–85	Qadsia	
2023–24	No competition played				
2024–25	Kuwait SC (15)	Kazma	3–0	—	
