= Brice Johnson =

American basketball player (born 1994)

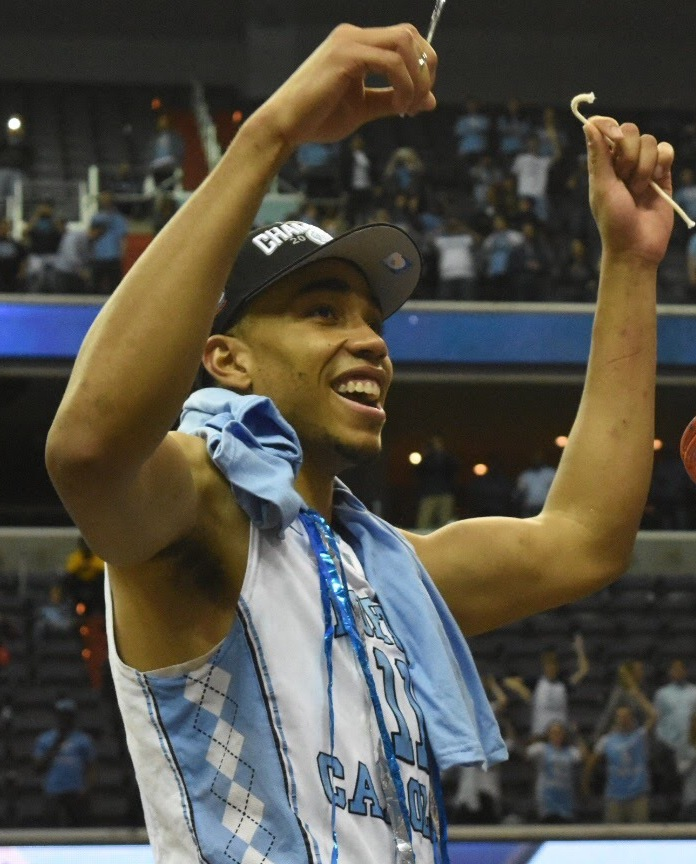
- Johnson with the North Carolina Tar Heels in 2016

Free agent
- Position: Power forward

Personal information
- Born: June 27, 1994 (age 32) Orangeburg, South Carolina, U.S.
- Listed height: 6 ft 9 in (2.06 m)
- Listed weight: 230 lb (104 kg)

Career information
- High school: Edisto (Orangeburg, South Carolina)
- College: North Carolina (2012–2016)
- NBA draft: 2016: 1st round, 25th overall pick
- Drafted by: Los Angeles Clippers
- Playing career: 2016–present

Career history
- 2016–2018: Los Angeles Clippers
- 2017: →Salt Lake City Stars
- 2017–2018: →Agua Caliente Clippers
- 2018: →Grand Rapids Drive
- 2018: Memphis Grizzlies
- 2018: →Memphis Hustle
- 2019: Indios de Mayagüez
- 2019–2020: Orlandina
- 2020: Chorale Roanne
- 2020–2021: Budivelnyk
- 2021–2023: Toyama Grouses
- 2023: Al-Seeb Club
- 2025: Nelson Giants

Career highlights
- Consensus first-team All-American (2016); First-team All-ACC (2016); Third-team All-ACC (2015); ACC All-Defensive Team (2016); No. 11 honored by North Carolina Tar Heels; First-team Parade All-American (2012); South Carolina Mr. Basketball (2012)
- Stats at NBA.com
- Stats at Basketball Reference

Jonathan Brice Johnson (born June 27, 1994) is an American professional basketball player who last played for the Nelson Giants of the New Zealand National Basketball League (NZNBL). He played college basketball for the North Carolina Tar Heels, graduating in 2016. He was selected in the first round (25th pick overall) by the Los Angeles Clippers in the 2016 NBA draft.

== Early life ==
Johnson is a native of Orangeburg, South Carolina and attended Edisto High School, where his father was the varsity basketball coach. Johnson's mother, Renee Johnson, died from colon cancer when he was a teenager.

== College recruitment ==
College recruiting
Name	Hometown	School	Height	Weight	Commit date
Brice Johnson; PF	Orangeburg, SC	Edisto HS	6 ft 9 in (2.06 m)	200 lb (91 kg)	Oct 26, 2010
Brice Johnson; PF	Recruit ratings: Scout: Rivals: (96)				

== College career ==
As a sophomore, Johnson averaged 10.3 points and 6.1 rebounds per game. As a junior, Johnson was named third-team All-ACC after averaging 12.6 points and 7.8 rebounds per game.

Johnson's senior season proved to be his most impressive and he collected many accolades. As a senior co-captain, Johnson led the Tar Heels to the outright ACC regular season title, as well as the ACC tournament championship. On January 4, 2016, Johnson scored 39 points and collected 23 rebounds in leading the Tar Heels in a victory over Florida State 106–90. He became the second North Carolina player in its history to score at least 39 points and grab 23 rebounds in a single game, after Billy Cunningham achieved the feat twice in 1964. He was named to the 35-man midseason watchlist for the Naismith Trophy on February 11. On March 27, 2016, Johnson set a new North Carolina school record for most double-doubles in a season. He also tied the North Carolina school record for most rebounds in a season with 399, matching Tyler Hansbrough's 2008 season. On March 29, 2016, Johnson was unanimously selected to the Associated Press' 2015–16 All-America team. Johnson finished the 2015–2016 college basketball season with 416 rebounds, setting a new UNC record for most rebounds in a season, passing Tyler Hansbrough. Brice Johnson playing some of his best basketball in college led the Tar Heels with Marcus Paige to the NCAA men's basketball championship game where they fell short to Villanova 77–74 where he put up 14 points and had 8 rebounds.

== Professional career ==
=== Los Angeles Clippers (2016–2018) ===
On June 23, 2016, Johnson was selected by the Los Angeles Clippers with the 25th overall pick in the 2016 NBA draft. On July 12, 2016, he signed his rookie scale contract with the Clippers. On October 8, 2016, he was ruled out indefinitely due to a herniated disk in his lower back. On February 23, 2017, he made his professional debut in a 123–113 loss to the Golden State Warriors, recording two rebounds in two minutes off the bench. During his rookie season, Johnson had multiple assignments to the Salt Lake City Stars of the NBA Development League, pursuant to the flexible assignment rule. On April 10, 2017, he recorded his first 2 points in a 125–96 win over the Houston Rockets.

=== Memphis Grizzlies (2018) ===
On January 29, 2018, Johnson, along with Willie Reed and Blake Griffin, was traded to the Detroit Pistons in exchange for Avery Bradley, Tobias Harris, Boban Marjanović, a future protected first-round draft pick and a future second-round draft pick. On February 8, the Pistons traded Johnson, along with a 2022 second-round draft pick, to the Memphis Grizzlies in exchange for James Ennis. On March 27, 2018, Johnson was waived by the Grizzlies.

=== Indios de Mayagüez (2019) ===
On February 19, 2019, Indios de Mayagüez of the Baloncesto Superior Nacional (BSN) announced that they had signed Johnson.

=== Orlandina (2019–2020) ===
On August 14, 2019, Johnson signed with Orlandina Basket. He averaged 17 points and 11 rebounds per game.

=== Chorale Roanne Basket (2020) ===
On January 11, 2020, Johnson signed with Chorale Roanne Basket of the LNB Pro A, a professional basketball league in France. He averaged 13 points and five rebounds per game.

=== BC Budivelnyk (2020–2021) ===
On October 7, 2020, Johnson signed with BC Budivelnyk of the Ukrainian Basketball SuperLeague. He averaged 13 points, 8.4 rebounds, 1.5 blocks and 1.2 steals per game.

=== Toyama Grouses (2021–2023) ===
On July 8, 2021, Johnson signed with the Toyama Grouses of the B.League. He played two seasons for the Grouses.

=== Al-Seeb (2023) ===
Johnson played for Omani club Al-Seeb Club during the 2023 Arab Club Basketball Championship. In five games, he averaged 23.0 points, 8.8 rebounds, 1.8 assists and 2.0 steals per game.

=== Nelson Giants (2025) ===
In February 2025, Johnson signed with the Nelson Giants of the New Zealand National Basketball League (NZNBL) for the 2025 season. On April 16, 2025, he was released by the Giants.

== NBA career statistics ==
Legend
GP	Games played	GS	Games started	MPG	Minutes per game
FG%	Field goal percentage	3P%	3-point field goal percentage	FT%	Free throw percentage
RPG	Rebounds per game	APG	Assists per game	SPG	Steals per game
BPG	Blocks per game	PPG	Points per game	**Bold**	Career high

=== Regular season ===
Year	Team	GP	GS	MPG	FG%	3P%	FT%	RPG	APG	SPG	BPG	PPG
2016–17	L.A. Clippers	3	0	3.1	.286	.000	.000	1.0	.3	**.7**	.3	1.3
2017–18	L.A. Clippers	**9**	0	4.2	**.636**	.000	**1.000**	1.4	.1	**.7**	.2	1.8
2017–18	Memphis	**9**	0	**6.7**	.419	.000	.333	**2.0**	.1	.3	.4	**3.0**
Career		21	0	5.1	.449	.000	.600	1.6	.1	.5	.3	2.2
