= Cady Lalanne =

Haitian basketball player (born 1992)

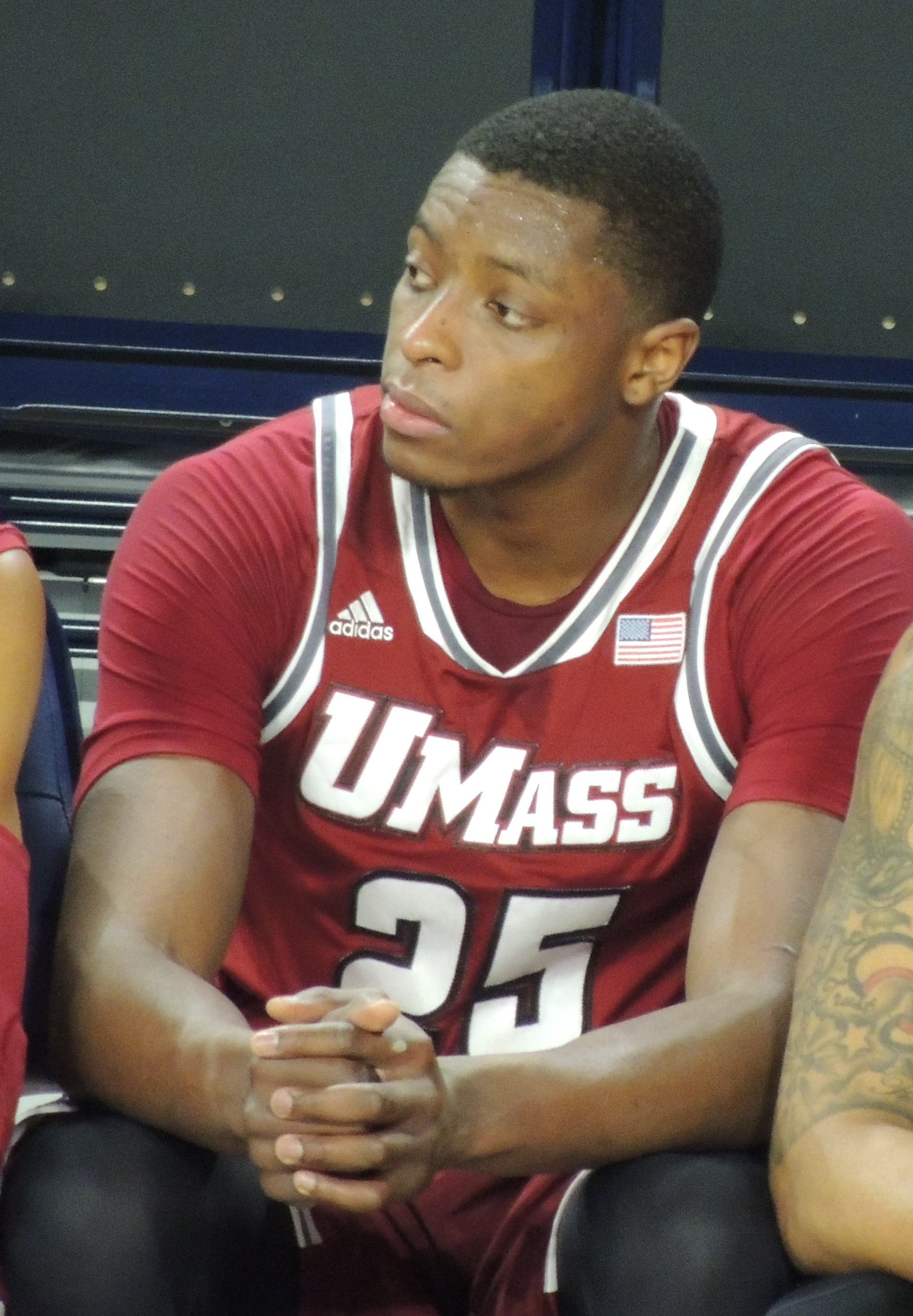

Free agent
- Position: Center

Personal information
- Born: April 22, 1992 (age 34) Port-au-Prince, Haiti
- Listed height: 208 cm (6 ft 10 in)
- Listed weight: 112 kg (247 lb)

Career information
- High school: Oak Ridge (Orlando, Florida)
- College: UMass (2011–2015)
- NBA draft: 2015: 2nd round, 55th overall pick
- Drafted by: San Antonio Spurs
- Playing career: 2015–present

Career history
- 2015–2016: Austin Spurs
- 2016: Capitanes de Arecibo
- 2016–2017: Zhejiang Golden Bulls
- 2017: Capitanes de Arecibo
- 2017–2018: New Basket Brindisi
- 2018: Beşiktaş
- 2018–2019: Manresa
- 2019: Piratas de Quebradillas
- 2019–2021: Changwon LG Sakers
- 2021–2022: Suwon KT Sonicboom
- 2022: San Pablo Burgos
- 2022–2024: Kuwait SC
- 2024–2025: Anyang Jung Kwan Jang Red Boosters
- 2025: Busan KCC Egis
- 2025: Sagesse Club
- 2025–2026: Kaohsiung Aquas
- 2026: Meralco Bolts
- 2026: NLEX Road Warriors
- 2026: Capitanes de Arecibo

Career highlights
- Arab Clubs Championship winner (2022); KBL Best 5 (2021); BSN champion (2016); NBA D-League All-Star (2016); Third-team All-Atlantic 10 (2015)
- Stats at Basketball Reference

Cady Lalanne (born April 22, 1992) is a Haitian professional basketball player who most recently played for the Capitanes de Arecibo of the Baloncesto Superior Nacional (BSN). He played college basketball for the UMass Minutemen.

== Early life ==
Lalanne, son of Bertha Lalanne, was born in Port-au-Prince, the capital city of Haiti. He moved to the U.S. when he was 7 years old. Lalanne attended Oak Ridge High School, in Orlando, Florida, where he starred on the varsity basketball team.

== College career ==
In 2011, Lalanne matriculated to the University of Massachusetts, where he earned a major in sociology. Playing four seasons at UMass, Lalanne became one of three players in school history to record 1,000 points, 800 rebounds and 100 blocks in a career. As a senior at UMass, he earned third-team All-Atlantic 10 honors after averaging 11.6 points and 9.5 rebounds in 32 games.

== Professional career ==
=== Austin Spurs (2015–2016) ===
On June 25, 2015, Lalanne was selected with the 55th overall pick in the 2015 NBA draft by the San Antonio Spurs. In July 2015, he joined the Spurs for the 2015 NBA Summer League. On October 30, 2015, he was assigned to the Austin Spurs of the NBA Development League, the affiliate team of San Antonio. On November 13, he made his professional debut in a 104–82 win over the Texas Legends, recording twelve points, four rebounds, one assist and one block in 27 minutes. On February 8, 2016, he was named in the West All-Star team for the 2016 NBA D-League All-Star Game as a replacement for Orlando Johnson, who received an NBA call-up. After averaging 12.6 points, 7.8 rebounds, 1.2 blocks and 26.3 minutes in 29 games. Lalanne was considered to be the best center in the D-League.

=== Capitanes de Arecibo (2016) ===
On April 28, 2016, Lalanne signed with the Capitanes de Arecibo of the Puerto Rican League. The next day, he made his debut for the Capitanes in a 76–70 loss to the Santeros de Aguada, recording nine points, seven rebounds and two blocks in 14 minutes off the bench.

=== Zhejiang Golden Bulls (2016–2017) ===
In July 2016, Lalanne joined the San Antonio Spurs for the 2016 NBA Summer League and on October 10, 2016, Lalanne signed with Zhejiang Golden Bulls of the Chinese Basketball Association.

=== New Basket Brindisi (2017–2018) ===
Lalanne signed with New Basket Brindisi of the Italian Lega Basket Serie A on August 19, 2017.

=== Beşiktaş Basketbol (2018) ===
On February 9, 2018, Lalanne signed with Beşiktaş Basketbol of the Turkish Basketball Super League.

=== Baxi Manresa (2018–2019) ===
On August 17, 2018, Lalanne signed a one-year deal with Baxi Manresa of the Liga ACB.

=== Piratas de Quebradillas (2019) ===
On June 3, 2019, Lalanne joined the Piratas de Quebradillas of the Puerto Rican League.

=== Changwon LG Sakers (2019–2021) ===
On June 10, 2019, Lalanne signed with the Changwon LG Sakers of the Korean league. After averaging 21.4 points and 10.9 rebounds per game, he re-signed with the team on April 27, 2020. He was replaced on the roster by Terrico White in January 2021 after he sustained a toe injury. He was named a KBL All-Star.

=== Suwon KT Sonicboom (2021–2022) ===
On July 4, 2021, he has signed with Suwon KT Sonicboom of the Korean Basketball League.

=== San Pablo Burgos (2022) ===
On April 28, 2022, he has signed with San Pablo Burgos of the Liga ACB.

=== Kuwait SC (2022–2024) ===
In October 2022, Lalanne played for the Kuwaiti team Kuwait SC in the 2022 Arab Club Basketball Championship held in Kuwait. He helped Kuwait SC win the Arab championship for the first time in club history.

=== Anyang Jung Kwan Jang Red Boosters (2024–2025) ===
On June 27, 2024, Lalanne signed with the Anyang Jung Kwan Jang Red Boosters of the Korean Basketball League.

=== Busan KCC Egis (2025) ===
On January 10, 2025, Lalanne was traded to the Busan KCC Egis in exchange for Deonte Burton.

=== Kaohsiung Aquas (2025–2026) ===
On August 3, 2025, Lalanne signed with the Kaohsiung Aquas of the Taiwan Professional Basketball League (TPBL).

On January 8, 2026, the Kaohsiung Aquas terminated the contract relationship with Lalanne.

=== NLEX Road Warriors (2026) ===
On February 2, 2026, Lalanne signed with the NLEX Road Warriors of the Philippine Basketball Association (PBA).

On February 8, 2026, Lalanne was loaned by NLEX to the Meralco Bolts for the East Asia Super League (EASL).

=== Return to Capitanes de Arecibo (2026) ===
On May 26, 2026, he signed with the Capitanes de Arecibo for a third stint, the team where he previously won a championship with in 2016.

=== NBA draft rights ===
On March 25, 2021, the San Antonio Spurs traded their draft rights to Lalanne to the Golden State Warriors in exchange for Marquese Chriss and cash considerations.
