= Hassan Dandach =

Lebanese basketball player (born 1991)

Al Hassan Dandache
No. 11 – Centrale
- Position: Point guard
- League: Lebanese Basketball League

Personal information
- Born: May 11, 1991 (age 35) Beirut, Lebanon
- Listed height: 6 ft 2 in (1.88 m)
- Listed weight: 85 kg (187 lb)

Career information
- Playing career: 2012–present

Hassan Dandach (Arabic: الحسن دندش) is a Lebanese professional basketball player. He currently plays the point guard position at Atlas Ferzol First Division. Hassan was selected by Lebanese scouts to be in the national team reserve roster after his performance in the 2013–14 season.

== Career ==
Al Hassan was born on May 11, 1991, in Beirut, Lebanon. Before starting his professional career Hassan had been training in the United States at various camps and showed an interest to enter in the 2013 NBA draft, but went in undrafted. Hassan moved back to Lebanon sign for Al Mouttahed Tripoli for one season before moving to Tadamon Zouk in the 2013–14 season.
