= Arab Club Basketball Championship =

Arab Club Championship
- Organising body: Arab Basketball Confederation
- Founded: 1976
- First season: 1978
- Country: ABC member associations
- Confederation: Arab world
- Number of teams: 12–18
- Current champions: (Lebanon) Sagesse (3rd title) (2026)
- Most championships: (Egypt) Al-Ittihad Alexandria (7 titles)
- 2026 Arab Club Basketball Championship

The Arab Club Championship is an annual basketball tournament for Arab teams. The competition is organised by the Arab Basketball Confederation (ABC). Each season is typically held in October and is held in one venue. The tournament typically features 16 to 18 clubs.

Egyptian Al-Ittihad Alexandria is the most successful club in the tournament's history, as it has won a record 7 titles.

== Summary ==
=== Tournament history ===
Year	Host	Champion	Score	Runner-up	Third-place
1978	(Syria) Aleppo	(Syria) Jalaa SC	84–71	(Jordan) Orthodox BC	(Saudi Arabia) Al Shabab SC
1987	(Algeria) Algiers	(Egypt) Al-Ittihad Alexandria	–	(Algeria) MC Alger	(Saudi Arabia) Ohud Medina
1988	(Morocco) Casablanca	(Iraq) Al-Rasheed	–	(Tunisia) ES Goulettoise	(Morocco) Monopoles
1989	(Egypt) Cairo	(Algeria) IRB Alger	–	(Egypt) Zamalek	(Tunisia) ES Goulettoise
1990	(Jordan) Amman	(Iraq) Al-Rasheed	–	(Kuwait) Kazma SC	(Algeria) IRB Alger
1991	(Egypt) Alexandria	(Egypt) Al-Ittihad Alexandria	–	(Egypt) Al Ahly Cairo	(Syria) Al-Ittihad Aleppo
1992	(Syria) Aleppo	(Syria) Al-Ittihad Aleppo	–	(Tunisia) ES Goulettoise	(Egypt) Al-Ittihad Alexandria
1993	(Egypt) Cairo	(Egypt) Gezira	–	(Tunisia) Stade Nabeulien	(Tunisia) Ezzahra Sports
1994	did not held
1995	(Egypt) Cairo	(Egypt) Al-Ittihad Alexandria	–	(Egypt) Gezira	(Egypt) Al Ahly
1996	(Lebanon) Beirut	(Egypt) Al-Ittihad Alexandria	70–63	(Lebanon) Hekmeh BC	(Saudi Arabia) Al-Hilal
1997	(Tunisia) Nabeul	(Tunisia) Stade Nabeulien	–	(Egypt) Zamalek	(Tunisia) Ezzahra Sports
1998	(Lebanon)	(Lebanon) Hekmeh BC	80–72	(Algeria) WA Boufarik	(Saudi Arabia) Al-Ittihad Jeddah
1999	(Lebanon)	(Lebanon) Hekmeh BC	79–67	(Egypt) Al Ahly Cairo	(Egypt) Al-Ittihad Alexandria
2000	(United Arab Emirates) Dubai	(Egypt) Gezira	53–51	(Egypt) Al Ahly Cairo	(Lebanon) Hekmeh BC
2001	(Saudi Arabia)	(Egypt) Gezira	70–69	(Algeria) MC Alger	(Egypt) Al Ahly
2002	(Lebanon)	(Egypt) Al-Ittihad Alexandria	75–55	(Algeria) MC Alger	(Egypt) Gezira
2003	did not held
2004	(Saudi Arabia) Gedda	(Saudi Arabia) Al-Ittihad (Jeddah)	87–79	(Egypt) Gezira	(Algeria) MC Alger
2005	(United Arab Emirates) Dubai	(Lebanon) Al Riyadi	87–82	(Jordan) Fastlink	(Egypt) Gezira
2006	(Morocco) Rabat	(Lebanon) Al Riyadi	99–75	(Saudi Arabia) Al-Ittihad Jeddah	(Morocco) Raja Casablanca
2007	(Saudi Arabia) Jeddah	(Lebanon) Al Riyadi	94–68	(Saudi Arabia) Al-Ahli	(Saudi Arabia) Al-Ittihad Jeddah
2008	(Jordan) Amman	(Jordan) Zain Club	72–67	(Lebanon) Hekmeh BC	Kuwait SC
2009	(Lebanon) Beyrouth	(Lebanon) Al Riyadi	60–49	(Lebanon) Hekmeh BC	(Jordan) ASU
2010	(Egypt) Alexandria	(Lebanon) Al Riyadi	93–73	(Lebanon) Al Mouttahed Tripoli	(Egypt) Al-Ittihad Alexandria
2011	(Qatar) Doha	(United Arab Emirates) Sharjah SC	80–73	(Morocco) AS Salé	(Jordan) ASU
2012	(Libya) Benghazi	(Libya) Al-Ahly Benghazi	No playoffs	(Tunisia) JS Kairouan	(Tunisia) ASC Bizerte
2013	(Libya) Benghazi	(Libya) Al-Ahly Benghazi	No playoffs	(Tunisia) AS Hammamet	(Tunisia) TACAPES Gabès
2014	(Morocco) Salé	(Qatar) Al Rayyan	85–78	(Morocco) AS Salé	(Lebanon) Al Riyadi
2015	(United Arab Emirates) Dubai	(Tunisia) Étoile Sportive du Sahel	74–62	(Algeria) GS Pétroliers	(Qatar) El Jaish SC
2016	(Tunisia) Sousse	(Tunisia) Étoile Sportive du Sahel	72–62	(Morocco) AS Salé	(Qatar) Al-Gharafa
2017	(Morocco) Salé	(Lebanon) Homenetmen	99–98	(Morocco) AS Salé	(Qatar) Al-Gharafa
2018	(Lebanon) Beirut	(Egypt) Al-Ittihad Alexandria	74–70	(Lebanon) Beirut Club	(Morocco) AS Salé
2019	(Morocco) Salé	(Egypt) Al-Ittihad Alexandria	90–86	(Lebanon) Beirut Club	(Tunisia) US Monastir
2020	Not held due to the COVID-19 pandemic
2021	(Egypt) Alexandria	(Egypt) Al Ahly Cairo	78–66	Kuwait	(Tunisia) Ezzahra Sports
2022	Kuwait	Kuwait	78–77	(Egypt) Al Ahly Cairo	(Lebanon) Beirut Club
2023	(Qatar) Doha	(Lebanon) Beirut Club	86–75	(Morocco) AS Salé	Kuwait
2024	(Egypt) Alexandria	(Qatar) Al-Arabi	81–71	(Egypt) Al-Ittihad Alexandria	(Egypt) Sporting Alexandria
2025	(United Arab Emirates) Dubai	Kuwait	101–93	(Lebanon) Sagesse	(Qatar) Al-Arabi
2026	(Lebanon) Ghazir	(Lebanon) Sagesse	84–75	(Syria) Al-Ittihad Aleppo	None

== Statistics ==
=== Titles by club ===
Club	Champion	Runner-up	Third
(Egypt) Al-Ittihad Alexandria	7 (1987, 1991, 1995, 1996, 2002, 2018, 2019)	1 (2024)	3 (1992, 1999, 2010)
(Lebanon) Al Riyadi	5 (2005, 2006, 2007, 2009, 2010)		1 (2014)
(Lebanon) Hekmeh BC	3 (1998, 1999, 2026)	4 (1996, 2008, 2009, 2025)	1 (2000)
(Egypt) Gezira	3 (1993, 2000, 2001)	2 (1995, 2004)	2 (2002, 2005)
Kuwait	2 (2022, 2025)	1 (2021)	1 (2008)
(Iraq) Al-Rasheed SC	2 (1988, 1990)		
(Tunisia) Étoile Sportive du Sahel	2 (2015, 2016)		
(Libya) Al-Ahly Benghazi	2 (2012, 2013)		
(Egypt) Al Ahly Cairo	1 (2021)	4 (1991, 1999, 2000, 2022)	2 (1995, 2001)
(Lebanon) Beirut Club	1 (2023)	2 (2018,2019)	1 (2022)
(Syria) Al-Ittihad Aleppo	1 (1992)	1 (2026)	1 (1991)
(Lebanon) Sagesse	1 (2026)	1 (2025)	
(Tunisia) Stade Nabeulien	1 (1997)	1 (1993)	
(Jordan) Zain Club *	1 (2008)	1 (2005)	
(Algeria) OC Alger **	1 (1989)		1 (1990)
(Qatar) Al Rayyan	1 (2014)		
(Syria) Jalaa SC	1 (1978)		
(United Arab Emirates) Sharjah SC	1 (2011)		
(Saudi Arabia) Al-Ittihad Jeddah	1 (2004)		
(Lebanon) Homenetmen	1 (2017)		
(Qatar) Al-Arabi	1 (2024)		

* ex. Fastlink
** ex. IRB Alger

=== Titles by country ===
Rank	Country	Champion	Runner-up	Third place	Total
1	Egypt	11	8	7	26
2	Lebanon	10	7	3	20
3	Tunisia	3	5	7	15
4	Kuwait	2	2	2	6
5	Syria	2	1	1	4
6	Qatar	2	0	4	6
7	Iraq	2	0	0	2
7	Libya	2	0	0	2
9	Algeria	1	5	2	8
10	Saudi Arabia	1	2	5	8
11	Jordan	1	2	2	5
12	United Arab Emirates	1	0	0	1
13	Morocco	0	5	3	8

== Performance by club (2015–present) ==
The following is a list of clubs who have played in the Arab Club Championship since the 2015 season.

1st	Champions
2nd	Runners-up
3rd	Third place
4th	Fourth place
SF	Semifinalists
QF	Quarterfinalists
R16	Round of 16
GS	Group phase
TBD	To be determined

Team	15	16	17	18	19	21	22	23	24	25	26	Total seasons	Highest finish
(Algeria) MC Alger	2nd	4th	4th	–	–	–	–	–	–	–	–	3	Runners-up
(Algeria) NB Staoueli	–	–	–	–	GS	–	–	–	–	–	–	1	Group stage
(Algeria) USM Alger	–	–	–	–	–	–	–	QF	–	–	–	1	Quarterfinals
(Algeria) USM Blida	–	–	–	–	–	GS	–	–	–	–	–	1	Group stage
(Algeria) WA Boufarik	–	–	–	–	–	QF	R16	–	–	–	–	2	Quarterfinals
(Bahrain) Al-Ahli Manama	–	–	–	–	–	–	R16	–	–	–	–	1	Round of 16
(Bahrain) Al-Muharraq	–	–	QF	–	–	–	–	QF	–	–	–	2	Quarterfinals
(Bahrain) Al-Riffa	–	–	–	–	GS	–	–	–	–	–	–	1	Group stage
(Bahrain) Manama Club	–	–	–	–	–	GS	–	–	–	QF	GS	3	Quarterfinals
(Kuwait) Al-Jahra	–	–	–	–	–	–	QF	–	–	–	–	1	Quarterfinals
Kuwait	–	–	–	–	GS	2nd	1st	3rd	–	1st	–	5	Champions
(Kuwait) Kazma	–	–	–	–	–	–	4th	–	4th	4th	–	3	Fourth place
(Kuwait) Al-Yarmouk	–	–	–	–	–	GS	–	–	–	–	–	1	Group stage
(Kuwait) Qadsia	–	–	–	–	–	–	–	QF	QF	GS	–	3	Quarterfinals
(Kuwait) Al-Sulaibikhat	–	–	–	–	–	–	–	–	–	–	GS	1	Group stage
(Lebanon) Beirut Club	–	–	–	2nd	2nd	QF	3rd	1st	–	–	QF	6	Champions
(Lebanon) Al Riyadi	GS	–	–	–	–	–	QF	–	–	–	–	2	Quarterfinals
(Lebanon) CS Antonine	–	–	–	–	–	–	–	–	–	QF	–	1	Quarterfinals
Dynamo Lebanon	–	–	–	–	–	–	–	R16	–	–	–	1	Round of 16
(Lebanon) Homenetmen Beirut	–	–	1st	4th	–	–	–	–	–	–	–	2	Champions
(Lebanon) Sagesse	–	GS	–	–	–	–	–	–	–	2nd	1st	3	Champions
(Lebanon) Club Central Jounieh	–	–	–	–	–	–	–	–	–	–	SF	1	Semifinals
(Lebanon) Hoops Club	–	–	–	–	–	–	–	–	–	–	QF	1	Quarterfinals
(Oman) Al Bashaer	–	–	–	–	–	–	R16	–	–	GS	–	2	Round of 16
(Oman) Al Nizwa	–	–	GS	–	–	–	–	–	–	–	–	1	Group stage
(Oman) Ahli Sidab	–	–	–	GS	GS	–	–	–	–	–	–	2	Group stage
(Oman) Al-Seeb	GS	GS	–	–	–	–	–	R16	GS	GS	GS	6	Round of 16
(Egypt) Al Ahly Cairo	–	–	–	–	–	1st	2nd	4th	–	–	–	3	Champions
(Egypt) Al Ittihad Alexandria	–	–	–	1st	1st	4th	QF	QF	2nd	–	–	6	Champions
(Egypt) Gezira	–	–	3rd	–	QF	–	–	–	–	–	–	2	Quarterfinals
(Egypt) Sporting Alexandria	GS	GS	–	QF	–	–	–	–	3rd	–	–	4	Quarterfinals
(Egypt) Smouha	–	–	–	–	–	–	–	–	QF	–	–	1	Quarterfinals
(Yemen) Al Mena	–	–	–	–	–	–	R16	–	–	GS	–	2	Round of 16
(Yemen) Al-Tilal	GS	–	–	–	–	–	–	–	–	–	–	1	Group stage
(Yemen) Shaa'b Hadramaut	–	–	–	–	–	GS	–	–	GS	GS	GS	4	Group stage
(Yemen) Al-Wehda	–	–	–	–	–	–	–	R16	–	–	–	1	Round of 16
(Morocco) AS Salé	–	2nd	2nd	3rd	4th	–	–	2nd	–	–	–	5	Runners-up
(Morocco) FAR Rabat	–	–	QF	–	QF	–	–	–	–	–	–	2	Quarterfinals
(Morocco) FUS Rabat	–	–	GS	–	–	QF	–	–	–	–	–	2	Quarterfinals
(Morocco) MTB Majd Tanger	–	–	–	–	–	–	–	R16	–	–	–	1	Round of 16
(Tunisia) ES Sahel	1st	1st	–	–	–	–	–	–	–	–	–	1	Champions
(Tunisia) Dalia Sportive de Grombalia	–	GS	–	–	–	–	–	–	–	–	–	1	Group stage
(Tunisia) Ezzahra Sports	–	–	–	–	–	3rd	–	–	–	–	–	1	Third place
(Tunisia) JS Menzah	–	–	QF	–	–	–	–	–	–	–	–	1	Quarterfinals
(Tunisia) US Monastir	4th	–	–	–	3rd	–	–	–	–	–	–	2	Third place
(Saudi Arabia) Al-Fateh	GS	GS	GS	QF	–	GS	–	–	–	–	–	5	Quarterfinals
(Saudi Arabia) Al Nassr	–	–	–	QF	–	–	–	R16	–	–	–	2	Quarterfinals
(Palestine) Al-Buraig	–	–	–	–	GS	–	–	–	–	–	–	1	Group stage
(Palestine) Al Bureij	–	–	–	–	–	–	–	R16	–	–	–	1	Round of 16
(Palestine) Qalandia	–	–	–	GS	–	–	–	–	–	–	–	1	Group stage
(United Arab Emirates) Al Bataeh	–	–	–	–	–	GS	–	–	GS	–	–	2	Group stage
(United Arab Emirates) Al Nasr	–	–	–	–	–	–	–	–	–	GS	–	1	Group stage
(United Arab Emirates) Shabab Al Ahli	QF	–	GS	–	–	–	–	–	–	–	–	2	Quarterfinals
(United Arab Emirates) Sharjah	GS	–	–	–	–	GS	–	–	GS	–	–	3	Group stage
(United Arab Emirates) Al Wahdda	–	–	–	–	–	–	–	–	QF	–	–	1	Quarterfinals
(Libya) Al-Ahly Benghazi	–	–	–	–	–	–	R16	–	–	–	–	1	Round of 16
(Libya) Al Ahli Tripoli	QF	–	–	–	QF	–	–	–	–	QF	–	3	Quarterfinals
(Libya) Al-Ittihad	–	–	–	–	–	–	–	GS	–	–	–	1	Group stage
(Iraq) Al-Mina'a	–	GS	–	–	–	GS	–	–	–	–	–	2	Group stage
(Iraq) Dijlah University	–	–	–	–	–	–	QF	–	–	–	–	1	Quarterfinals
(Iraq) Al-Shorta	QF	–	–	–	–	–	–	–	–	–	–	1	Quarterfinals
(Syria) Al-Ittihad Aleppo	–	–	–	–	–	–	R16	QF	–	–	2nd	3	Runners-up
(Syria) Al Wahda	–	–	–	–	–	–	–	–	–	GS	–	1	Group stage
(Syria) Homs Al Fidaa	–	–	–	–	–	–	–	–	–	GS	QF	2	Quarterfinals
(Qatar) Al-Ahli Doha	–	–	–	–	–	–	–	GS	–	–	–	1	Group stage
(Qatar) Al-Arabi	–	–	–	QF	–	–	–	–	1st	3rd	SF	4	Champions
(Qatar) Al-Gharafa	–	3rd	QF	–	–	GS	R16	–	QF	–	–	5	Third place
(Qatar) Al Rayyan	QF	–	–	–	QF	–	–	–	–	QF	QF	4	Quarterfinals
(Qatar) Al Sadd	–	–	–	–	–	–	R16	–	–	–	–	1	Round of 16
(Qatar) El Jaish	4th	–	–	–	–	–	–	–	–	–	–	1	Fourth place
(Qatar) Al-Wakrah	–	–	–	–	–	QF	–	–	–	–	–	1	Quarterfinals
Qatar SC	–	–	–	–	–	–	–	R16	–	–	–	1	Round of 16
(Sudan) Alyounany	–	–	–	–	GS	GS	–	–	–	–	–	2	Group stage

MC Alger (ex. GS Pétroliers).

== Awards ==
After each tournament, several individual awards are handed out including the best scorer, three-point scorer, most valuable player and best foreign player.

=== Most valuable player ===
Season	Player	Club	Ref.
2021	(Egypt) Ehab Amin	(Egypt) Al Ahly	
2023	(Lebanon) Sergio El Darwich	(Lebanon) Beirut Club	
2024	(Qatar) Mustafa "Mosty" Ali	(Qatar) Al-Arabi	

=== Best scorer ===
Season	Player	Club	Ref.
2023	(Morocco) Ilias Aqboub	(Morocco) AS Salé	
2024	(Qatar) Mostafa Foda	(Qatar) Al-Arabi	

=== Best three-point shooter ===
Season	Player	Club	Ref.
2023	(Lebanon) Jean Marc Jarroush	(Lebanon) Beirut Club	
2024	(Egypt) Ahmed "Dola" Adel	(Egypt) Al Ittihad Alexandria	

== See also ==
- Arab Women's Club Basketball Championship
