= Kuwait SC (basketball) =

- Nickname: The Brigadiers (العميد)
- Leagues: Kuwaiti Division I Basketball League
- Founded: 20 October 1960; 65 years ago
- Location: Kuwait City, Kuwait
- Team colors: Red, White
- Chairman: Khalid Al Ghanim
- Head coach: Dušan Stojkov
- Championships: 9 (2004, 2013, 2014, 2015, 2020, 2021, 2022, 2023, 2025)
Home	Away

Kuwait SC active departments
Football (men's)	Handball (men's)	Basketball (men's)

Kuwait Sporting Club, shortly known as Kuwait SC or Kuwait Club, is a Kuwaiti professional basketball club. The club competes in the Kuwaiti Division I Basketball League, which it has won fourteen times. Kuwait SC has won the Arab Club Basketball Championship once, in 2022 and is the first team from Kuwait to win an Arab title. The club has traditionally provided Kuwait's national basketball team with key players.

Kuwait Club were the runners-up in the 2022–23 West Asia Super League, and have won the Gulf League subdivision title two times (2023 and 2024).

== Honours ==
=== National competitions ===
Kuwaiti Division 1 League

- Champions (15): 1966, 1982, 2003, 2004, 2006, 2013, 2014, 2015, 2017, 2019, 2020, 2021, 2022, 2023, 2024

Kuwaiti Basketball Association Cup

- Winners (16): 1965, 2001, 2002, 2003, 2006, 2007, 2009, 2011, 2013, 2017, 2018, 2019, 2020, 2021, 2022, 2023

Kuwaiti Basketball Super Cup

- Winners (8): 2012, 2017, 2018, 2019, 2020, 2021, 2022, 2023

=== International competitions ===
Arab Clubs Championship

- Winners (2): 2022, 2025
- Runners-up (1): 2021

WASL

- Runners-up (1): 2022–23
- Gulf League Champions (2): 2022–23, 2023–24

== Players ==
=== Current roster ===
Note: Flags indicate national team eligibility at FIBA-sanctioned events. Players may hold other non-FIBA nationalities not displayed.

Kuwait SC roster
Players
Coaches

Pos.	No.	Nat.	Name	Ht.	Age
F	00	(United States)	Jones, Jamal	2.03 m (6 ft 8 in)	33 – 17 February 1993
SF	1	(Kuwait)	Matwali, Mustafa	2.03 m (6 ft 8 in)	28 – 26 February 1998
PG	3	(Kuwait) (Germany)	Alghais, Alexander	1.91 m (6 ft 3 in)	32 – 15 November 1993
G	5	(Kuwait)	Hasan, Hamad	1.94 m (6 ft 4 in)	29 – 25 August 1997
SG	6	(Kuwait)	Alshammari, Sahou	1.92 m (6 ft 4 in)	23 – 31 December 2002
PG	9	(Kuwait)	Alshemmari, Turki	1.76 m (5 ft 9 in)	32 – 24 August 1994
PG	10	(Kuwait)	Aldhafairi, Fahed	1.79 m (5 ft 10 in)	36 – 18 December 1989
G	11	(Kuwait)	Alhamdan, Yousif	1.85 m (6 ft 1 in)	31 – 22 October 1994
C	20	(Kuwait)	Jawhar, Omran	2.03 m (6 ft 8 in)	26 – 5 January 2000
SF	21	(Kuwait)	Hasan, Mohammad	1.94 m (6 ft 4 in)	26 – 4 June 2000
F/C	32	(United States)	Onuaku, Chinanu	2.08 m (6 ft 10 in)	29 – 1 November 1996
PF	68	(Kuwait)	Alhadhoud, Ali	2.03 m (6 ft 8 in)	31 – 17 May 1995

Head coach

- (Serbia) Dušan Stojkov

Legend

- (C) Team captain
- Injured

- Roster
Updated: 10 August 2026

=== Notable players ===
Note: Flags indicate national team eligibility at FIBA-sanctioned events. Players may hold other non-FIBA nationalities not displayed.

Criteria

To appear in this section a player must have either:

- Set a club record or won an individual award while at the club
- Played at least one official international match for their national team at any time
- Played at least one official NBA match at any time.

- (Croatia) Jasmin Perković
- (Bosnia and Herzegovina) Elmedin Kikanović
- (Poland) A.J. Slaughter
- (Dominican Republic) (United States) James Feldeine
- (Haiti) Cady Lalanne
- (United States) Marcus Georges-Hunt

== See also ==
- Kuwait SC
