= Sharjah SC (basketball) =

- League: UAE National Basketball League
- Founded: 1966 (as An Nahl Sharjah)
- History: An Nahl Sharjah; 1966–2017; Sharjah SC; 2017–present
- Location: Sharjah, United Arab Emirates
- Team colors: White, red and blue
- Head coach: Abdul Hamid Ibrahim

Sharjah SC, also known as Al Sharjah, is an Emirati professional basketball team based in Sharjah. In 2017, An Nahl Sharjah Club and Shaab merged into one new club named Al Sharjah. The team plays in the UAE National Basketball League, the highest tier. It is the basketball section of the Sharjah FC club, mainly known for its football team. Sharjah has won the UAE League championship once, in 2020.

== Honours ==
=== National Competitions ===
UAE National Basketball League

- Champions (1): 2020

=== International Competitions ===
Arab Club Basketball Championship

- Champions (1): 2011
