= Al-Arabi SC (basketball) =

Al Arabi SC
- Nickname: Fareeg Al-Ahlam (The Dream Team); The Red Devils; Century Club in Qatar
- Leagues: Qatari Basketball League
- Founded: 1952
- Arena: Grand Hamad Stadium
- Location: Doha, Qatar
- Team colors: Red and White
- President: Sheikh Tamin bin Fahad Al-Thani
- Championships: 9 Qatari Championship; 7 Emir of Qatar Cup; 2 Qatar Crown Prince Cup
- Website: alarabi.qa
Home	Away

Al Arabi's active sections
Football	Basketball	Handball
Volleyball	Futsal	Reserves

Al Arabi Basketball Team (Arabic: فريق العربي لكرة السلة) is a Qatari professional basketball team based in Doha, Qatar. Al Arabi is one of the most successful basketball clubs in Qatar, with many domestic and international titles to its name. It is part of the Al Arabi Sports Club multisport club.

Al-Arabi won the 2024 Arab Club Basketball Championship.

== Honours ==
=== Domestic ===
- Qatari Championship

Winners (11): 1974–75, 1975–76, 1981–82, 1982–83, 1983–84, 1984–85, 1985–86, 1991–92, 1993–94, 2017-18, 2023-24

- Qatari Cup

Winners (2): 2007, 2012

- Emir of Qatar Cup

Winners (2): 1982, 2018

=== International ===
- Arab Club Basketball Championship
  - Winners (1): 2024
- GCC Clubs Championship

Winners (1): 2008

== Players ==
=== Current roster ===
Note: Flags indicate national team eligibility at FIBA-sanctioned events. Players may hold other non-FIBA nationalities not displayed.

Al Arabi roster
Players
Coaches

Pos.	No.	Nat.	Name	Ht.
PG	4	(Qatar)	Christian Casas	1.75 m (5 ft 9 in)
G	5	(Qatar)	Moustafa Lashin	1.88 m (6 ft 2 in)
G	14	(Qatar)	Jassim Alhammadi	1.78 m (5 ft 10 in)
G	7	(Qatar)	Khaled Abdelbaset	1.93 m (6 ft 4 in)
F	9	(Qatar)	Ousmane Dieng	1.94 m (6 ft 4 in)
F	10	(Qatar)	Omar Abdelbaset	2.01 m (6 ft 7 in)
PG	11	(Qatar)	Ghassan Hajar	1.75 m (5 ft 9 in)
C	17	(Serbia)	Aleksandar Marelja	2.06 m (6 ft 9 in)
PG	19	(Qatar)	Momar Gueye	1.87 m (6 ft 2 in)
F	23	(United States)	Kelechi Ajukwa	2.01 m (6 ft 7 in)

Head coach

- (Tunisia) Hatem Mamlouk

Assistant coach(es)

- (Qatar) Khaldoun Nachawi

Legend

- (C) Team captain
- Injured
