= Al-Jahra SC (basketball) =

Kuwaiti basketball team

Al-Jahra
- League: Kuwaiti Division I Basketball League
- Founded: 1972
- Championships: 2 Kuwaiti Leagues; 1 Kuwaiti Mubarak Cup

Al-Jahra SC, also written as Al Jahraa, is a Kuwaiti professional basketball team based in Jahra City. It is the basketball team of the multi-sports club with the same name. The team plays in the Kuwaiti Division 1, and has won the league in 1996 and 1997.

== Notable players ==
Note: Flags indicate national team eligibility at FIBA-sanctioned events. Players may hold other non-FIBA nationalities not displayed.

Criteria

To appear in this section a player must have either:

- Set a club record or won an individual award while at the club
- Played at least one official international match for their national team at any time
- Played at least one official NBA match at any time.

- (Tunisia) Salah Mejri
- (Lebanon) Wael Arakji
- (United States) Kalin Lucas
