= Beirut Club =

Lebanese basketball team

- League: Lebanese Basketball League
- History: Beirut Club; 2013–present
- Arena: Chiyah Forum
- Capacity: 2,500
- Location: Beirut, Lebanon
- Main sponsor: Emirates
- President: Nadim Hakim
- Vice-president: Elie Samaha
- Team manager: Joseph Abdelmassih
- Head coach: Jad El Hajj
- Team captain: AJ English
- Championships: 1 (2022)

Beirut Club (Arabic: نادي بيروت) is a professional basketball team based in Beirut, Lebanon, who plays in the Lebanese Basketball League (LBL), the top-flight of basketball in Lebanon. Home games are played in the Chiyah Stadium.

The club was first promoted to the Lebanese Basketball League in 2017, and has played there ever since. The club won their first LBL championship in 2022, defeating Al Riyadi in the final. Beirut Club has won the Arab Championship in 2023, and was the runner-up in two consecutive finals in 2018 and 2019.

== Current squad ==
Beirut Club roster
Players
Coaches

Pos.	No.	Nat.	Name	Ht.	Age
F	0	(United States)	Mitchell, Tony	1.98 m (6 ft 6 in)	37 – 7 August 1989
G	1	(Lebanon) (Spain)	Martinez, Miguel	1.88 m (6 ft 2 in)	38 – 30 January 1988
G	3	(Lebanon)	Mougharbel, Fadi	1.90 m (6 ft 3 in)	24 – 12 May 2002
G	5	(Lebanon)	Tabch, Omar	1.92 m (6 ft 4 in)	21 – 3 March 2005
F	7	(Lebanon)	Naba, Anthony	2.01 m (6 ft 7 in)	20 – 15 April 2006
G	8	(United States)	Thornton, Marcus	1.93 m (6 ft 4 in)	33 – 9 February 1993
F/C	9	(Lebanon)	Makhlouf, Jean	2.05 m (6 ft 9 in)	23 – 9 September 2003
F	12	(Lebanon)	Owayda, Mahmoud	1.97 m (6 ft 6 in)	26 – 18 November 1999
F/C	15	(Lebanon)	El Khatib, Hadi	2.04 m (6 ft 8 in)	19 – 18 August 2007
G	23	(United States)	Frazier II, Michael	1.91 m (6 ft 3 in)	32 – 8 March 1994
G/F	24	(United States)	Dubar, Darlinstone	2.01 m (6 ft 7 in)	25 – 15 August 2001
C	31	(Lebanon)	Assaf, Mostafa	2.06 m (6 ft 9 in)	21 – 26 November 2004
SG	77	(Lebanon)	Sabbagh, Abed	1.90 m (6 ft 3 in)	22 – 5 February 2004

Head coach

- (Lebanon) Jad El Hajj

Assistant coach(es)

- (Lebanon) Marwan Diab
- (Lebanon) Georges Akiki

Legend

- (C) Team captain
- Injured

- Roster
Updated: 15 October 2026

Pos.	Starting 5	Bench 1	Bench 2
C	Mostafa Assaf	Deng Acuoth
PF	Anthony Naba	Jean Makhlouf	Hadi El Khatib
SF	Darlinstone Dubar	Mahmoud Owayda	Tony Mitchell
SG	Abed Sabbagh	Michael Frazier II	Omar Tabch
PG	Fadi Mougharbel	Miguel Martinez

== Honours ==
=== Domestic competitions ===
- Lebanese Basketball League
  - Champions (1): 2021–22
    - Runners-up (1): 2018–19
- Lebanese Cup
  - Champions (2): 2021–22, 2023-24

=== International competitions ===
- Arab Club Basketball Championship
  - Gold (1) : 2023
  - Silver (2): 2018, 2019
  - Bronze (1): 2022
- Dubai International Basketball Tournament
  - Gold (1) : 2025
  - Silver (1) : 2019
- WASL West Asia League
  - Bronze (1) : 2023
- Doha International basketball championship
  - Gold (1) : 2023
