= Kazma SC (basketball) =

Kazma
- League: Kuwaiti Division I Basketball League; West Asia Super League
- Founded: 31 August 1964
- Arena: Shaikh Saad Alabdullah Sport Hall Complex
- Location: Kuwait City, Kuwait
Home	Away

Kazma Sporting Club (Arabic: ادي كاظمة الرياضي), also known as simply Kazma, is a Kuwaiti professional basketball team based in Kuwait City. It plays in the Kuwaiti Division 1, the national top-flight league. The home arena of Kazma is the Shaikh Saad Alabdullah Sport Hall Complex.

Founded in 1964, the club has been the runner-up in the Arab Club Basketball Championship in 1990 and finished in the third place of the FIBA Asia Champions Cup twice (1990 and 1991). Kazma was also one of the eighteen teams for the inaugural West Asia Super League in 2022–23.

== Honour ==
Kuwaiti Division I Basketball League (10)

- Champion: 1968, 1980, 1988, 1989, 1990, 1992, 1994, 2000, 2001, 2012

Kuwaiti Basketball Association Cup (3)

- Winner: 1969, 1988, 2016
  - Second: 2011, 2013, 2024
  - Bronze: 2010, 2012

Kuwaiti Basketball Super Cup (0)

- Second: 2022

Arab Club Basketball Championship

- Silver (1): 1990

ABC Championship / Asian Basketball Championship

- Bronze (2): 1990, 1991

== Players ==
=== Current roster ===
Note: Flags indicate national team eligibility at FIBA-sanctioned events. Players may hold other non-FIBA nationalities not displayed.

Kazma SC roster
Players
Coaches

Pos.	No.	Nat.	Name	Ht.	Age
G	3	(Kuwait)	Mohsen, Abdulaziz	1.81 m (5 ft 11 in)	34 – 21 March 1991
PG	5	(Kuwait)	Albaloushi, Ahmad	1.82 m (6 ft 0 in)	34 – 5 April 1990
PF	9	(Kuwait)	Fadhel, Abdulaziz	1.91 m (6 ft 3 in)	36 – 26 March 1988
F	12	(Kuwait)	Alhamidi, Abdulaziz	1.91 m (6 ft 3 in)	37 – 16 September 1987
PF	15	(Kuwait)	Aljuma'h, Abdulrahman	1.90 m (6 ft 3 in)	37 – 8 September 1987
C	21	(Kuwait)	Marzouq, Mohammad	1.95 m (6 ft 5 in)	32 – 25 May 1992
F	34	(Kuwait)	Borhamah, Yousiff	1.90 m (6 ft 3 in)	30 – 2 August 1994
PG	77	(Kuwait)	Alfares, Hamad	1.80 m (5 ft 11 in)	25 – 24 August 1999
C	92	(Kuwait)	Almezeiel, Bassel	2.00 m (6 ft 7 in)	25 – 2 June 1999
		(Kuwait)	Alali, Hamad		24 – 7 November 2000
		(Kuwait)	Albader, Abdullah		29 – 28 May 1995
G		(Kuwait)	Albaghdadi, Abdulaziz	1.76 m (5 ft 9 in)	27 – 18 March 1998
G		(Kuwait)	Albuloushi, Yousef	1.91 m (6 ft 3 in)	20 – 15 November 2004
SG		(Kuwait)	Alomani, Khalifah	1.88 m (6 ft 2 in)	20 – 27 June 2004
		(Jordan)	Khader, Abdallah		23 – 9 May 2001
C		(Kuwait)	Matar, Matar	1.87 m (6 ft 2 in)	21 – 13 January 2004

Head coach

- (Serbia) Bojan Lazic

Legend

- (C) Team captain
- Injured

- Roster
Updated: 16 November 2023
