= 2023 FIBA Basketball World Cup qualification (Asia) =

2023 FIBA Basketball World Cup
Asian Qualification

Tournament details
- Dates: 26 November 2021 – 27 February 2023
- Teams: 16 (from 2 confederations)

Official website
- Asian qualifiers website

The 2023 FIBA Basketball World Cup qualification for the FIBA Asia-Oceania region began in November 2021 and concluded in February 2023. The process determined the six teams that would join the automatically qualified co-hosts the Philippines and Japan at the 2023 FIBA Basketball World Cup.

== Entrants ==
The 16 teams that have qualified for the 2022 FIBA Asia Cup participated in the first round of the FIBA Basketball World Cup Asian qualifiers.

- Australia
- Bahrain
- China
- Chinese Taipei
- India
- Indonesia
- Iran
- Japan
- Jordan
- Kazakhstan
- Lebanon
- New Zealand
- Philippines
- Saudi Arabia
- South Korea
- Syria

== Format ==
In total, eight World Cup berths were allocated for the Asia-Oceania region. Two slots were automatically given to Philippines and Japan as co-hosts. The third co-host Indonesia did not have automatic qualification. Instead, it depended on their performance at the 2022 FIBA Asia Cup, which they hosted in July 2022. If the country finished in the top eight of the Asia Cup, they would automatically qualify for the World Cup as co-host and five slots from those qualifiers would be contested. If the country did not finish among the top eight, six slots were contested. In the end, Indonesia did not finish among the top eight, and six slots for the World Cup were contested. Despite automatic qualification, co-hosts competed in these qualifiers by virtue of qualifying to the 2022 FIBA Asia Cup.

The qualification structure is as follows:

- First round: The 16 teams were divided into four groups of four teams to play double round-robin system (home-and-away matches). Three best placed teams from a group advanced to the second round.
- Second round: The 12 teams were divided into two groups of six teams. Each group were formed from teams advanced from two first round groups. All results from the previous round were carried over. Six best placed teams (excluding automatic qualified co-hosts) from this round qualified for the World Cup.

== Draw ==
The draw was held on 31 August 2021 in Mies, Switzerland.

=== Seeding ===
Seedings were announced on 30 August 2021. Teams were seeded based on geographical principles and FIBA rankings. Teams from pots 1, 3, 5 and 7 were drawn to Groups A and B, while teams from pots 2, 4, 6 and 8 were drawn to Groups C and D.

Pot 1
Team	Pos
Australia	3
New Zealand	25

Pot 5
Team	Pos
Philippines	31
Japan	35

Pot 2
Team	Pos
Iran	22
Jordan	39

Pot 6
Team	Pos
Syria	82
Indonesia	85

Pot 3
Team	Pos
China	28
South Korea	29

Pot 7
Team	Pos
Chinese Taipei	68
India	78

Pot 4
Team	Pos
Lebanon	56
Kazakhstan	72

Pot 8
Team	Pos
Saudi Arabia	87
Bahrain	102

== First round ==
The 16 teams qualified were divided into four groups of four teams. Each team faced the other teams in their group on a home-and-away basis over three windows. The top three teams from each group qualified for the next round. The 2023 hosts Japan and Philippines automatically qualified regardless of their final ranking in their respective groups.

All times are local.

=== Group A ===
Pos	Team	Pld	W	L	PF	PA	PD	Pts	Qualification
1	New Zealand	4	4	0	390	229	+161	8	Second round
2	Philippines (Note: Philippines advanced to the second round as one of the pre-qualified host teams, regardless of the first round results and standings.)	4	2	2	290	321	−31	6	Second round
3	India	4	0	4	233	363	−130	4	Second round
4	South Korea (Note: South Korea forfeited the games against the Philippines and New Zealand due to positive COVID-19 cases among its delegation and was subsequently disqualified.)	0	0	0	0	0	0	0	Disqualified

Source: FIBA
Rules for classification: 1) Points; 2) Head-to-head results; 3) Points difference; 4) Points scored.
Notes:

24 February 2022 (Note: The game, originally scheduled for the November 2021 window, was played during the February 2022 window.)	New Zealand	101–46	India	Quezon City, Philippines
15:00	Scoring by quarter: 32–8, 20–17, 18–10, 31–11
	Pts: Vodanovich 21; Rebs: Loe 10; Asts: Loe 6	Boxscore	Pts: Sekhon 10; Rebs: Sekhon 5 Asts: Bhriguvanshi, Sekhon 4	Arena: Araneta Coliseum; Attendance: 206; Referees: Takaki Kato (JPN), Christopher Reid (AUS), Nattapong Jontapa (THA)

25 February 2022	India	64–88	Philippines	Quezon City, Philippines
18:00	Scoring by quarter: 13–18, 19–26, 15–24, 17–20
	Pts: Sekhon 14; Rebs: Rawat 10; Asts: Muthu Krishnan 5	Boxscore	Pts: Ramos 17; Rebs: Kouame 9 Asts: Gómez de Liaño, Ramos 3	Arena: Araneta Coliseum; Attendance: 2,000; Referees: Mohamed Al-Salam (BHR), Suebpong Wichaipin (THA), Budi Marfan (INA)

27 February 2022	New Zealand	88–63	Philippines	Quezon City, Philippines
19:00	Scoring by quarter: 22–19, 18–11, 25–18, 23–15
	Pts: Prewster, Vodanovich 20; Rebs: Loe, Vodanovich 10; Asts: Prewster 6	Boxscore	Pts: Ravena 23; Rebs: Ramos 10; Asts: Ravena 5	Arena: Araneta Coliseum; Attendance: 3,114; Referees: Takaki Kato (JPN), Christopher Reid (AUS), Daigo Urushima (JPN)

28 February 2022	India	60–95	New Zealand	Quezon City, Philippines
15:00	Scoring by quarter: 20–24, 7–28, 18–21, 15–22
	Pts: three players 10; Rebs: Rawat 6 Asts: Bhriguvanshi 4	Boxscore	Pts: Vodanovich 20; Rebs: Loe, Vodanovich 10; Asts: Harris 5	Arena: Araneta Coliseum; Attendance: 68; Referees: Budi Marfan (INA), James Grigul (AUS), Nattapong Jontapa (THA)

30 June 2022	Philippines	60–106	New Zealand	Auckland, New Zealand
19:30	Scoring by quarter: 13–23, 8–24, 22–26, 17–33
	Pts: Tamayo 16; Rebs: Ramos 9 Asts: Ramos 4	Boxscore	Pts: Prewster 15; Rebs: Vodanovich 9 Asts: Webster 5	Arena: Eventfinda Stadium; Attendance: 3,827; Referees: Takaki Kato (JPN), Vaughan Mayberry (AUS), Yuen Chun Yip (HKG)

3 July 2022	Philippines	79–63	India	Pasay
19:00	Scoring by quarter: 21–10, 24–14, 20–20, 14–19
	Pts: Ramos 21; Rebs: Chiu 11; Asts: Quiambao 6	Boxscore	Pts: Hafeez 13; Rebs: Aryan, Goti 7 Asts: Sekhon 5	Arena: SM Mall of Asia Arena; Attendance: 5,307; Referees: Mohamed Al-Salam (BHR), Suebpong Wichaipin (THA), Haryanto Sutaryo (INA)

=== Group B ===
Pos	Team	Pld	W	L	PF	PA	PD	Pts	Qualification
1	Australia	6	6	0	513	365	+148	12	Second round
2	China	6	4	2	493	397	+96	10	Second round
3	Japan (Note: Japan advanced to the second round as one of the pre-qualified host teams, regardless of the first round results and standings.)	6	2	4	417	483	−66	8	Second round
4	Chinese Taipei	6	0	6	366	544	−178	6	

Source: FIBA
Rules for classification: 1) Points; 2) Head-to-head results; 3) Points difference; 4) Points scored.
Notes:

27 November 2021	China	79–63	Japan	Sendai, Japan
12:05	Scoring by quarter: 27–11, 18–18, 19–11, 15–23
	Pts: Guo, Zhou Q. 24; Rebs: Zhou Q. 13; Asts: Hu, Zhao R. 5	Boxscore	Pts: Nishida 11; Rebs: Evans 8 Asts: Togashi 5	Arena: Xebio Arena Sendai; Attendance: 0 Referees: Harja Jaladri (INA), Lee Kyoung-hwan (KOR), Leong Chuen Wing (SIN)

28 November 2021	Japan	73–106	China	Sendai
18:35	Scoring by quarter: 10–29, 19–24, 21–31, 23–22
	Pts: Terashima 16; Rebs: Evans 10; Asts: Chambers 4	Boxscore	Pts: Zhao R. 27; Rebs: Wang 8 Asts: Zhao J. 8	Arena: Xebio Arena Sendai; Attendance: 1,575; Referees: Harja Jaladri (INA), Park Kyoung-jin (KOR), Lee Kyoung-hwan (KOR)

25 February 2022	Australia	98–61	Chinese Taipei	Okinawa, Japan
15:05	Scoring by quarter: 28–11, 20–11, 22–30, 28–9
	Pts: Kay 14; Rebs: Kay, Moller 7 Asts: Kay, Mudronja 5	Boxscore	Pts: Artino 14; Rebs: Artino 8 Asts: Chou K. 4	Arena: Okinawa Arena; Attendance: 104; Referees: Harja Jaladri (INA), Glenn Cornelio (PHI), Park Kyoung-jin (KOR)

26 February 2022	Chinese Taipei	71–76	Japan	Okinawa, Japan
12:05	Scoring by quarter: 21–15, 18–18, 14–16, 18–27
	Pts: Chou K. 21; Rebs: Artino 18; Asts: Artino 5	Boxscore	Pts: Nishida 27; Rebs: Evans 12; Asts: Evans, Togashi 4	Arena: Okinawa Arena; Attendance: 898; Referees: Harja Jaladri (INA), Park Kyoung-jin (KOR), Lee Kyoung-hwan (KOR)

27 February 2022	Australia	80–64	Japan	Okinawa, Japan
18:30	Scoring by quarter: 22–14, 20–26, 22–9, 16–15
	Pts: Kay 15; Rebs: Kay 11; Asts: Naar 11	Boxscore	Pts: Togashi 19; Rebs: Evans 6 Asts: Togashi 5	Arena: Okinawa Arena; Attendance: 2,253; Referees: Harja Jaladri (INA), Lee Kyoung-hwan (KOR), Glenn Cornelio (PHI)

28 February 2022	Chinese Taipei	71–90	Australia	Okinawa, Japan
15:30	Scoring by quarter: 25–29, 21–27, 10–17, 15–17
	Pts: Artino 20; Rebs: Artino 13; Asts: Pai 6	Boxscore	Pts: Kay 14; Rebs: Kay 11; Asts: Kay 10	Arena: Okinawa Arena; Attendance: 86; Referees: Lee Kyoung-hwan (KOR), Glenn Cornelio (PHI), Park Kyoung-jin (KOR)

30 June 2022	Australia	76–69	China	Melbourne
18:40	Scoring by quarter: 17–15, 26–19, 14–21, 19–14
	Pts: Dellavedova 16; Rebs: Dellavedova, Froling 7 Asts: Dellavedova, White 4	Boxscore	Pts: Zhou 16; Rebs: Zhou 13; Asts: Zhao R. 3	Arena: John Cain Arena; Attendance: 8,113; Referees: Harja Jaladri (INA), Glenn Cornelio (PHI), Park Kyoung-jin (KOR)

1 July 2022	China	94–58	Chinese Taipei	Melbourne, Australia
17:10	Scoring by quarter: 26–17, 16–21, 30–10, 22–10
	Pts: Hu 26; Rebs: Wang 9 Asts: Zhao 9	Boxscore	Pts: Lin B. 15; Rebs: Chang 5 Asts: three players 2	Arena: John Cain Arena; Attendance: 2,038; Referees: Dallas Pickering (NZL), Leong Chuen Wing (SIN), Budi Marfan (INA)

1 July 2022	Japan	52–98	Australia	Melbourne, Australia
19:40	Scoring by quarter: 13–22, 4–25, 10–21, 25–30
	Pts: Tominaga 18; Rebs: Evans 6 Asts: Fujii 3	Boxscore	Pts: McDaniel, McDowell-White 14; Rebs: Maker 9 Asts: McDowell-White 6	Arena: John Cain Arena; Attendance: 4,235; Referees: Harja Jaladri (INA), Glenn Cornelio (PHI), Park Kyoung-jin (KOR)

3 July 2022	Japan	89–49	Chinese Taipei	Melbourne, Australia
16:10	Scoring by quarter: 25–14, 17–13, 18–9, 29–13
	Pts: Tominaga 17; Rebs: Toews 9 Asts: Kawamura 8	Boxscore	Pts: Tang 15; Rebs: Tang 10; Asts: Yu 3	Arena: John Cain Arena; Attendance: 4,650; Referees: Dallas Pickering (NZL), Budi Marfan (INA), Joenard Garcia (PHI)

3 July 2022	China	48–71	Australia	Melbourne, Australia
18:40	Scoring by quarter: 18–16, 11–14, 16–15, 3–26
	Pts: Wang 12; Rebs: Zhou 8 Asts: Guo, Zhu 2	Boxscore	Pts: White 16; Rebs: White 14; Asts: McDowell-White 5	Arena: John Cain Arena; Attendance: 9,043; Referees: Harja Jaladri (INA), Glenn Cornelio (PHI), Park Kyoung-jin (KOR)

4 July 2022	Chinese Taipei	56–97	China	Melbourne, Australia
18:40	Scoring by quarter: 14–34, 12–21, 16–19, 14–23
	Pts: Yu 11; Rebs: Sun 5 Asts: Chen C. 4	Boxscore	Pts: Wang, Zhou 16; Rebs: Zhou 10; Asts: Sun 7	Arena: John Cain Arena; Attendance: 1,306; Referees: Dallas Pickering (NZL), Park Kyoung-jin (KOR), Leong Chuen Wing (SGP)

=== Group C ===
Pos	Team	Pld	W	L	PF	PA	PD	Pts	Qualification
1	Lebanon	6	5	1	529	374	+155	11	Second round
2	Jordan	6	4	2	447	401	+46	10	Second round
3	Saudi Arabia	6	3	3	425	436	−11	9	Second round
4	Indonesia (Note: Indonesia could have secured automatic qualification as co-hosts had they advanced to the quarter-finals of the 2022 FIBA Asia Cup in Jakarta.)	6	0	6	351	541	−190	6	

Source: FIBA
Rules for classification: 1) Points; 2) Head-to-head results; 3) Points difference; 4) Points scored.
Notes:

26 November 2021	Jordan	68–61	Saudi Arabia	Amman
19:00	Scoring by quarter: 14–14, 11–22, 25–15, 18–10
	Pts: Al-Awadi 16; Rebs: Hussein 10; Asts: Ibrahim 5	Boxscore	Pts: Al-Salik 14; Rebs: Al-Suwailem 12; Asts: Abdel-Gabar 6	Arena: Prince Hamzah Hall; Attendance: 315; Referees: Ahmed Al-Shuwaili (IRQ), Mohammad Al-Amiri (KUW), Anan Daraghma (PLE)

26 November 2021	Lebanon	96–38	Indonesia	Zouk Mikael
21:00	Scoring by quarter: 19–10, 27–12, 29–11, 21–5
	Pts: El Darwich 17; Rebs: Arakji, Haidar 10; Asts: Haidar 5	Boxscore	Pts: Jawato 13; Rebs: Jawato 8 Asts: Prastawa 2	Arena: Stade Nouhad Naufal; Attendance: 5,000; Referees: Mohammad Doost (IRI), Wissam Zein (SYR), Hadi Salem (IRI)

29 November 2021	Indonesia	64–110	Lebanon	Zouk Mikael, Lebanon
16:00	Scoring by quarter: 21–29, 26–25, 8–32, 9–24
	Pts: Jawato 20; Rebs: Jawato 6 Asts: Prastawa 3	Boxscore	Pts: Arakji 19; Rebs: Majok 11; Asts: Arakji 4	Arena: Stade Nouhad Naufal; Attendance: 777; Referees: Mohammad Doost (IRI), Wissam Zein (SYR), Hadi Salem (IRI)

29 November 2021	Saudi Arabia	72–64	Jordan	Jeddah
18:30	Scoring by quarter: 20–24, 11–15, 21–13, 20–12
	Pts: Abdel-Gabar, Al-Marwani 15; Rebs: Abdel-Gabar 10; Asts: Abdel-Gabar, Al-Suwailem 3	Boxscore	Pts: Abu Hawwas 18; Rebs: Abbaas 12; Asts: Abbaas 4	Arena: King Abdullah Sports City Hall; Attendance: 4,600; Referees: Yevgeniy Mikheyev (KAZ), Alexey Stepanenko (KAZ), Mohamed Al-Salam (BHR)

24 February 2022	Saudi Arabia	95–66	Indonesia	Jeddah
19:15	Scoring by quarter: 23–15, 27–16, 19–18, 26–17
	Pts: Al-Marwani 16; Rebs: Al-Suwailem 12; Asts: Abdel Gabar, Al-Marwani 5	Boxscore	Pts: Prosper 18; Rebs: Jawato 7 Asts: Grahita 3	Arena: King Abdullah Sports City Hall; Attendance: 2,100; Referees: Ahmed Al-Shuwaili (IRQ), Chan Owe Shiong (MAS), Alexey Stepanenko (KAZ)

24 February 2022	Jordan	74–63	Lebanon	Amman
19:00	Scoring by quarter: 19–12, 14–19, 23–13, 18–19
	Pts: Tucker 31; Rebs: Al-Dwairi 12; Asts: Ibrahim 11	Boxscore	Pts: Arakji, Khayat 12; Rebs: Majok 12; Asts: Mansour 6	Arena: Prince Hamzah Hall; Attendance: 4,200; Referees: Yevgeniy Mikheyev (KAZ), Ahmed Al-Bulushi (OMA), Wissam Zein (SYR)

27 February 2022	Jordan	94–64	Indonesia	Amman
18:00	Scoring by quarter: 24–15, 18–14, 30–14, 22–21
	Pts: Hawwas, Ibrahim 17; Rebs: Abuwazaneh 8 Asts: Ibrahim 10	Boxscore	Pts: Grahita 24; Rebs: Jawato 5 Asts: Grahita 4	Arena: Prince Hamzah Hall; Attendance: 2,200; Referees: Yevgeniy Mikheyev (KAZ), Ahmed Al-Bulushi (OMA), Wissam Zein (SYR)

27 February 2022	Saudi Arabia	68–81	Lebanon	Jeddah
19:15	Scoring by quarter: 15–27, 17–8, 18–22, 18–24
	Pts: Al-Marwani 18; Rebs: Al-Suwailem 11; Asts: Al-Salik 4	Boxscore	Pts: Haidar 23; Rebs: Haidar 8 Asts: Gyokchyan 4	Arena: King Abdullah Sports City Hall; Attendance: 3,369; Referees: Ahmed Al-Shuwaili (IRQ), Chan Owe Shiong (MAS), Alexey Stepanenko (KAZ)

1 July 2022	Indonesia	67–69	Saudi Arabia	Jakarta
19:30	Scoring by quarter: 18–14, 21–17, 9–18, 19–20
	Pts: Kosasih 15; Rebs: Jawato 14; Asts: Saputera 4	Boxscore	Pts: Al-Muwallad 18; Rebs: Al-Marwani 9 Asts: Al-Marwani 3	Arena: Istora Gelora Bung Karno; Attendance: 3,128; Referees: Preeda Muongmee (THA), Chan Owe Shiong (MAS), Nattapong Jontapa (THA)

1 July 2022	Lebanon	89–70	Jordan	Zouk Mikael
21:00	Scoring by quarter: 15–21, 31–7, 17–18, 26–24
	Pts: Saoud 24; Rebs: three players 6 Asts: El Darwich, Mezher 6	Boxscore	Pts: Tucker 22; Rebs: Al-Dwairi 9 Asts: Tucker 5	Arena: Stade Nouhad Naufal; Attendance: 7,557; Referees: Ahmed Al-Shuwaili (IRQ), Yevgeniy Mikheyev (KAZ), Mohammad Doost (IRI)

4 July 2022	Indonesia	52–77	Jordan	Jakarta
19:30	Scoring by quarter: 18–17, 8–20, 4–22, 22–18
	Pts: Xzavierro 14; Rebs: Xzavierro 8 Asts: Saputera, Teja 3	Boxscore	Pts: three players 11; Rebs: Al-Dwairi 10; Asts: Ibrahim, Kanaan 4	Arena: Istora Gelora Bung Karno; Attendance: 2,797; Referees: Preeda Muongmee (THA), Chan Owe Shiong (MAS), Nattapong Jontapa (THA)

4 July 2022	Lebanon	90–60	Saudi Arabia	Zouk Mikael
21:00	Scoring by quarter: 20–19, 25–12, 19–15, 26–14
	Pts: Arledge 19; Rebs: Arledge 8 Asts: El Darwich 8	Boxscore	Pts: Al-Marwani 14; Rebs: Abdel-Gabar, Al-Marwani 6 Asts: Abdel-Gabar 4	Arena: Stade Nouhad Naufal; Attendance: 6,880; Referees: Yevgeniy Mikheyev (KAZ), Ahmed Al-Shuwaili (IRQ), Mohammad Doost (IRI)

=== Group D ===
Pos	Team	Pld	W	L	PF	PA	PD	Pts	Qualification
1	Kazakhstan	6	5	1	452	384	+68	11	Second round
2	Iran	6	4	2	482	395	+87	10	Second round
3	Bahrain	6	2	4	380	475	−95	8	Second round
4	Syria	6	1	5	416	476	−60	7	

Source: FIBA
Rules for classification: 1) Points; 2) Head-to-head results; 3) Points difference; 4) Points scored.

26 November 2021	Iran	82–66	Bahrain	Tehran
17:00	Scoring by quarter: 24–17, 12–12, 28–14, 18–23
	Pts: Jamshidi 21; Rebs: Kazemi 26; Asts: Kazemi 12	Boxscore	Pts: Haji 17; Rebs: Kowaid, Azzam 4 Asts: Isa, Kowaid 3	Arena: Azadi Basketball Hall; Attendance: 100; Referees: Ahmed Al-Bulushi (OMA), Paul Skayem (LBN), Issam Al-Siyabi (OMA)

26 November 2021	Kazakhstan	84–74	Syria	Nur-Sultan
20:00	Scoring by quarter: 17–24, 16–14, 21–15, 30–21
	Pts: Murzagaliyev 20; Rebs: Bazhin 11; Asts: Murzagaliyev 8	Boxscore	Pts: Hinton 33; Rebs: Hinton 10; Asts: Bakar, Shaban 3	Arena: Saryarka Velodrome; Attendance: 870; Referees: Rabah Noujaim (LBN), Mohammad Taha (JOR), Taha Al-Hashedi (YEM)

29 November 2021	Syria	71–81	Kazakhstan	Damascus
18:00	Scoring by quarter: 20–18, 17–21, 18–21, 16–21
	Pts: Hinton 32; Rebs: Saddir 7 Asts: Saddir, Shaban 4	Boxscore	Pts: Bykov 24; Rebs: Bazhin 8 Asts: Balashov 5	Arena: Al-Fayhaa Sports Arena; Attendance: 3,500; Referees: Ahmed Al-Shuwaili (IRQ), Mohammad Al-Amiri (KUW), Paul Skayem (LBN)

29 November 2021	Bahrain	64–100	Iran	Isa Town
19:00	Scoring by quarter: 17–24, 18–25, 15–23, 14–28
	Pts: Kowaid 17; Rebs: Giles 8 Asts: Ebrahim 5	Boxscore	Pts: Yakhchali 22; Rebs: Kazemi 17; Asts: three players 6	Arena: Khalifa Sports City Stadium; Attendance: 1,100; Referees: Rabah Noujaim (LBN), Ahmed Al-Bulushi (OMA), Mohammad Taha (JOR)

24 February 2022	Iran	69–73	Kazakhstan	Tehran
17:00	Scoring by quarter: 15–18, 23–18, 20–12, 11–25
	Pts: Jamshidi 32; Rebs: Kazemi 8 Asts: Jamshidi 4	Boxscore	Pts: Bazhin 23; Rebs: Marchuk 7 Asts: Clemmons, Murzagaliyev 6	Arena: Azadi Basketball Hall; Attendance: 70; Referees: Mohammad Al-Amiri (KUW), Mohammad Taha (JOR), Saif Al-Dossari (QAT)

24 February 2022	Bahrain	64–80	Syria	Manama
19:00	Scoring by quarter: 7–19, 12–20, 22–23, 23–18
	Pts: Isa 18; Rebs: Giles 11; Asts: Isa 6	Boxscore	Pts: Hinton 36; Rebs: Canbolat 11; Asts: three players 5	Arena: Khalifa Sports City Stadium; Attendance: 1,500; Referees: Rabah Noujaim (LBN), Paul Skayem (LBN), Taha Al-Hashedi (YEM)

27 February 2022	Iran	80–68	Syria	Tehran
17:00	Scoring by quarter: 15–18, 24–18, 20–19, 21–13
	Pts: Jamshidi 41; Rebs: Hassanzadeh 10; Asts: Jamshidi 8	Boxscore	Pts: Hinton 18; Rebs: Adribe 8 Asts: Hinton 5	Arena: Azadi Basketball Hall; Attendance: 250; Referees: Mohammad Al-Amiri (KUW), Mohammad Taha (JOR), Saif Al-Dossari (QAT)

27 February 2022	Bahrain	48–95	Kazakhstan	Manama
19:00	Scoring by quarter: 8–16, 19–24, 13–21, 8–34
	Pts: Haji 17; Rebs: Giles 8 Asts: Giles, Hamooda 3	Boxscore	Pts: Murzagaliyev 19; Rebs: Gavrilov 9 Asts: Murzagaliyev 7	Arena: Khalifa Sports City Stadium; Attendance: 800; Referees: Rabah Noujaim (LBN), Paul Skayem (LBN), Taha Al-Hashedi (YEM)

1 July 2022	Kazakhstan	68–60	Iran	Nur-Sultan
20:00	Scoring by quarter: 22–23, 19–12, 11–14, 16–11
	Pts: Murzagaliyev 26; Rebs: Bazhin, M. Marchuk 9 Asts: Balashov 5	Boxscore	Pts: Haddadi 18; Rebs: Haddadi 10; Asts: Jamshidi 5	Arena: Saryarka Velodrome; Attendance: 1,100; Referees: Ahmed Al-Bulushi (OMA), Paul Skayem (LBN), Taha Al-Hashedi (YEM)

1 July 2022	Syria	67–76	Bahrain	Aleppo
18:00	Scoring by quarter: 8–20, 19–19, 21–15, 19–22
	Pts: Hinton 34; Rebs: Canbolat, Cheikh Ali 6 Asts: Oubeid 6	Boxscore	Pts: Chism 20; Rebs: Chism 7 Asts: Isa 12	Arena: Al-Hamadaniah Sports Arena; Attendance: 13,500; Referees: Rabah Noujaim (LBN), Mohammad Al-Amiri (KUW), Mohammad Taha (JOR)

4 July 2022	Syria	56–91	Iran	Aleppo
18:00	Scoring by quarter: 8–22, 20–17, 15–25, 13–27
	Pts: Issa 13; Rebs: Adribe 5 Asts: three players 3	Boxscore	Pts: Jamshidi 16; Rebs: Haddadi 15; Asts: Kazemi, Mozaffari 5	Arena: Al-Hamadaniah Sports Arena; Attendance: 5,000; Referees: Rabah Noujaim (LBN), Mohammad Al-Amiri (KUW), Mohammad Taha (JOR)

4 July 2022	Kazakhstan	51–62	Bahrain	Nur-Sultan
20:00	Scoring by quarter: 24–9, 5–28, 10–12, 12–13
	Pts: Balashov, Gavrilov 10; Rebs: Gavrilov 7 Asts: Balashov 2	Boxscore	Pts: Chism 16; Rebs: Chism 12; Asts: Isa 5	Arena: Saryarka Velodrome; Attendance: 980; Referees: Ahmed Al-Bulushi (OMA), Paul Skayem (LBN), Taha Al-Hashedi (YEM)

== Second round ==
The top three teams from all groups were grouped in two groups of six teams, where each team faced teams from another group. Results from the first round were carried over. The top three teams from each group, along with hosts Japan and the Philippines, qualified for the World Cup.

All times are local.

=== Group E ===
As only three teams played in Group A, after the disqualification of South Korea, the result of the qualified teams from Group C against the last-placed team were not carried over.

Pos	Team	Pld	W	L	PF	PA	PD	Pts	Qualification
1	New Zealand	10	8	2	926	689	+237	18	2023 FIBA Basketball World Cup
2	Lebanon	10	7	3	870	768	+102	17	2023 FIBA Basketball World Cup
3	Philippines	10	6	4	802	768	+34	16 (Note: Philippines 164–157 Jordan)	2023 FIBA Basketball World Cup as hosts
4	Jordan	10	6	4	775	751	+24	16	2023 FIBA Basketball World Cup
5	Saudi Arabia	10	3	7	654	767	−113	13	
6	India	10	0	10	611	895	−284	10	

Source: FIBA
Rules for classification: 1) Points; 2) Head-to-head results; 3) Points difference; 4) Points scored.
Notes:

25 August 2022	Jordan	80–64	India	Amman
19:00	Scoring by quarter: 17–17, 29–10, 18–16, 16–21
	Pts: Tucker 18; Rebs: Al-Dwairi 12; Asts: Tucker 8	Boxscore	Pts: Hafeez, Nayak 15; Rebs: Rawat, Tomar 9 Asts: Muthu 6	Arena: Prince Hamzah Hall; Attendance: 3,200; Referees: Alexey Stepanenko (KAZ), Hadi Salem (IRI), Anan Daraghma (PLE)

25 August 2022	Saudi Arabia	65–80	New Zealand	Dammam
19:15	Scoring by quarter: 19–27, 6–28, 24–9, 16–16
	Pts: Abdel Gabar 22; Rebs: Abdel Gabar 8 Asts: Abdel Gabar 4	Boxscore	Pts: Ili 14; Rebs: Timmins 8 Asts: Ili 8	Arena: Dammam Green Hall; Attendance: 1,500; Referees: Harja Jaladri (INA), Mohammad Al-Amiri (KUW), Mohamed Al-Salam (BHR)

25 August 2022	Lebanon	85–81	Philippines	Zouk Mikael
21:00	Scoring by quarter: 22–25, 27–22, 19–16, 17–18
	Pts: Arakji 24; Rebs: Haidar 9 Asts: Gyokchyan, Haidar 4	Boxscore	Pts: Clarkson 27; Rebs: Ramos 10; Asts: Clarkson 7	Arena: Stade Nouhad Naufal; Attendance: 7,477; Referees: Yevgeniy Mikheyev (KAZ), Mohammad Doost (IRI), Wissam Zein (SYR)

29 August 2022	India	63–95	Lebanon	Bangalore
18:00	Scoring by quarter: 17–27, 12–22, 13–22, 21–24
	Pts: Prince 19; Rebs: Rawat 7 Asts: Hafeez 9	Boxscore	Pts: Arledge 21; Rebs: Ezzedine 5 Asts: Mezher 6	Arena: Kanteerava Indoor Stadium; Attendance: 1,050; Referees: Ahmed Al-Bulushi (OMA), Daigo Urushima (JPN), Chan Owe Shiong (MAS)

29 August 2022	New Zealand	100–72	Jordan	Auckland
19:00	Scoring by quarter: 29–10, 23–24, 24–17, 24–21
	Pts: Ili 16; Rebs: Fotu, Gold 8 Asts: Cameron 6	Boxscore	Pts: Abu Hawwas, Tucker 19; Rebs: Tucker 12; Asts: Ibrahim 6	Arena: Eventfinda Stadium; Attendance: 1,250; Referees: Leong Chuen Wing (SGP), Zhang Xiao (CHN), Craig Copes (AUS)

29 August 2022	Philippines	84–46	Saudi Arabia	Pasay
19:00	Scoring by quarter: 11–14, 26–14, 24–8, 23–10
	Pts: Clarkson 23; Rebs: Sotto 13; Asts: Clarkson 6	Boxscore	Pts: three players 9 Rebs: Mo. Al-Marwani 8 Asts: Abdel Gabar 9	Arena: SM Mall of Asia Arena; Attendance: 19,829; Referees: Takaki Kato (JPN), Christopher Reid (AUS), Chuang Chih-chun (TPE)

10 November 2022	Jordan	66–74	Philippines	Amman
19:00	Scoring by quarter: 20–21, 21–16, 10–21, 15–16
	Pts: Tucker 23; Rebs: Al-Dwairi 16; Asts: Ibrahim 6	Boxscore	Pts: Sotto 16; Rebs: Thompson 13; Asts: Thompson 8	Arena: Prince Hamzah Hall; Attendance: 5,000; Referees: Yevgeniy Mikheyev (KAZ), Wissam Zein (SYR), Chan Owe Shiong (MAS)

10 November 2022	Saudi Arabia	85–54	India	Jeddah
19:00	Scoring by quarter: 19–14, 19–14, 28–19, 19–7
	Pts: Abdel Gabar, Aljohar 16; Rebs: Mo. Al-Marwani, Aljohar 7 Asts: Abdel Gabar 5	Boxscore	Pts: Mathew 10; Rebs: Rawat 10; Asts: Hafeez 5	Arena: King Abdullah Sports City Hall; Attendance: 500; Referees: Ahmed Al-Shuwaili (IRQ), James Boyer (AUS), Alexey Stepanenko (KAZ)

10 November 2022	Lebanon	77–65	New Zealand	Beirut
21:00	Scoring by quarter: 18–22, 13–15, 22–11, 24–17
	Pts: Haidar 21; Rebs: Gyokchyan 9 Asts: Mansour 6	Boxscore	Pts: Smith-Milner 17; Rebs: Harris 8 Asts: three players 2	Arena: Pierre Gemayel Hall; Attendance: 1,617; Referees: Mohammad Doost (IRI), Mohammad Al-Amiri (KUW), Hadi Salem (IRI)

13 November 2022	Jordan	92–75	New Zealand	Amman
19:00	Scoring by quarter: 27–23, 14–18, 23–14, 28–20
	Pts: Al-Dwairi 22; Rebs: Al-Dwairi 12; Asts: Ibrahim 14	Boxscore	Pts: Smith-Milner 17; Rebs: Harris 7 Asts: Britt 6	Arena: Prince Hamzah Hall; Attendance: 2,923; Referees: Yevgeniy Mikheyev (KAZ), Wissam Zein (SYR), Chan Owe Shiong (MAS)

13 November 2022	Saudi Arabia	63–76	Philippines	Jeddah
19:00	Scoring by quarter: 16–16, 9–15, 20–24, 18–21
	Pts: Ma. Al-Marwani 19; Rebs: Ma. Al-Marwani 8 Asts: Abdel Gabar 5	Boxscore	Pts: Pogoy, Ramos 13; Rebs: Sotto, Thompson 9 Asts: Ramos 4	Arena: King Abdullah Sports City Hall; Attendance: 9,500; Referees: Ahmed Al-Shuwaili (IRQ), James Boyer (AUS), Alexey Stepanenko (KAZ)

13 November 2022	Lebanon	103–74	India	Beirut
21:00	Scoring by quarter: 27–20, 22–16, 28–21, 26–17
	Pts: Haidar 27; Rebs: Hadidian, Haidar 8 Asts: Khalil 9	Boxscore	Pts: Hafeez 16; Rebs: Meena 7 Asts: Hafeez 7	Arena: Pierre Gemayel Hall; Attendance: 3,100; Referees: Mohammad Doost (IRI), Mohammad Al-Amiri (KUW), Hadi Salem (IRI)

24 February 2023	Philippines	107–96	Lebanon	Bocaue
18:00	Scoring by quarter: 25–19, 28–22, 29–23, 25–32
	Pts: Brownlee 17; Rebs: three players 5 Asts: Thompson 6	Boxscore	Pts: Saoud 27; Rebs: Mansour 7 Asts: El Darwich 6	Arena: Philippine Arena; Attendance: 12,956; Referees: Yu Jung (TPE), James Boyer (AUS), Daigo Urushima (JPN)

24 February 2023	India	63–98	Jordan	Bangalore
18:00	Scoring by quarter: 14–30, 7–33, 25–20, 17–15
	Pts: Muthu Krishnan 19; Rebs: Rawat, Aryan 6 Asts: Hafeez 6	Boxscore	Pts: Ibrahim 21; Rebs: Alhamarsheh 7 Asts: Ibrahim 13	Arena: Kanteerava Indoor Stadium; Attendance: 400; Referees: Yevgeniy Mikheyev (KAZ), Issam Al-Siyabi (OMA), Taha Al-Hashedi (YEM)

24 February 2023	New Zealand	110–63	Saudi Arabia	Christchurch
19:00	Scoring by quarter: 36–16, 29–17, 29–14, 16–16
	Pts: Rusbatch 21; Rebs: Waardenburg 8 Asts: Britt 9	Boxscore	Pts: Ashoor 13; Rebs: Alsuwailem 7 Asts: Abdel Gabar 5	Arena: Christchurch Arena; Attendance: 3,773; Referees: Scott Beker (AUS), Takaki Kato (JPN), Christopher Reid (AUS)

27 February 2023	India	60–71	Saudi Arabia	Bangalore
15:30	Scoring by quarter: 19–16, 14–21, 15–14, 12–20
	Pts: Muthu Krishnan 22; Rebs: Rawat 8 Asts: Hafeez, Singh 5	Boxscore	Pts: Alsuwailem 27; Rebs: Ma. Al-Marwani, Alsuwailem 10; Asts: Abdel Gabar 8	Arena: Kanteerava Indoor Stadium; Attendance: 500; Referees: Yevgeniy Mikheyev (KAZ), Taha Al-Hashedi (YEM), Issam Al-Siyabi (OMA)

27 February 2023	Philippines	90–91	Jordan	Bocaue
18:00	Scoring by quarter: 14–33, 27–27, 23–10, 26–21
	Pts: Brownlee 41; Rebs: Brownlee 12; Asts: Thompson 7	Boxscore	Pts: Tucker 22; Rebs: Tucker 12; Asts: Ibrahim 8	Arena: Philippine Arena; Attendance: 5,196; Referees: Yu Jung (TPE), James Boyer (AUS), Daigo Urushima (JPN)

27 February 2023	New Zealand	106–91	Lebanon	Wellington
19:00	Scoring by quarter: 30–20, 28–30, 26–30, 22–11
	Pts: Ngatai, Rangi 21; Rebs: Harris 8 Asts: Ngatai, Rodger 6	Boxscore	Pts: Saoud 28; Rebs: Hadidian 5 Asts: three players 3	Arena: TSB Bank Arena; Attendance: 2,907; Referees: Takaki Kato (JPN), Scott Beker (AUS), Christopher Reid (AUS)

=== Group F ===
Pos	Team	Pld	W	L	PF	PA	PD	Pts	Qualification
1	Australia (Note: As Australia forfeited one game, they did not receive a point.)	12	11	1	993	657	+336	22 (Note: Australia 2–0 China)	2023 FIBA Basketball World Cup
2	China	12	10	2	959	792	+167	22	2023 FIBA Basketball World Cup
3	Japan	12	7	5	917	878	+39	19	2023 FIBA Basketball World Cup as hosts
4	Iran	12	6	6	856	824	+32	18	2023 FIBA Basketball World Cup
5	Kazakhstan	12	5	7	779	872	−93	17	
6	Bahrain	12	2	10	761	1004	−243	14	

Source: FIBA
Rules for classification: 1) Points; 2) Head-to-head results; 3) Points difference; 4) Points scored.
Notes:

25 August 2022	Bahrain	50–104	Australia	Isa Town
19:00	Scoring by quarter: 10–27, 18–26, 13–26, 9–25
	Pts: Chism 16; Rebs: Chism 8 Asts: M. Rashed 5	Boxscore	Pts: Vasiljevic 22; Rebs: Froling, Travers 9 Asts: Kay, Norton 6	Arena: Khalifa Sports City Stadium; Attendance: 750; Referees: Paul Skayem (LBN), Mohammad Taha (JOR), Suebpong Wichaipin (THA)

25 August 2022	Kazakhstan	56–68	China	Nur-Sultan
20:00	Scoring by quarter: 14–23, 10–18, 18–7, 14–20
	Pts: Murzagaliyev 14; Rebs: M. Marchuk, R. Marchuk 5 Asts: Murzagaliyev 5	Boxscore	Pts: Zhou 19; Rebs: Zhou 11; Asts: Hu 2	Arena: Saryarka Velodrome; Attendance: 3,000; Referees: Ahmed Al-Shuwaili (IRQ), Park Kyoung-jin (KOR), Preeda Muongmee (THA)

25 August 2022	Iran	79–68	Japan	Tehran
20:30	Scoring by quarter: 25–27, 19–5, 21–15, 14–21
	Pts: Yakhchali 30; Rebs: Kazemi 17; Asts: Jamshidi 5	Boxscore	Pts: Baba 27; Rebs: Yoshii 8 Asts: Togashi 6	Arena: Azadi Basketball Hall; Attendance: 1,000; Referees: Rabah Noujaim (LBN), Issam Al-Siyabi (OMA), Nattapong Jontapa (THA)

29 August 2022	Australia	98–68	Iran	Bendigo
18:30	Scoring by quarter: 27–15, 14–15, 24–28, 33–10
	Pts: Vasiljevic 23; Rebs: Froling 8 Asts: Travers 4	Boxscore	Pts: Jamshidi 17; Rebs: Pazirofteh 7 Asts: Mashayekhi 5	Arena: Bendigo Stadium; Attendance: 2,339; Referees: Yu Jung (TPE), Matthew Bathurst (NZL), Budi Marfan (INA)

29 August 2022	China	80–67	Bahrain	Nur-Sultan, Kazakhstan
20:00	Scoring by quarter: 25–11, 17–22, 20–13, 18–21
	Pts: Zhou 22; Rebs: Zhou 7 Asts: Sun 6	Boxscore	Pts: M. Rashed 24; Rebs: Chism 11; Asts: three players 2	Arena: Saryarka Velodrome; Attendance: 1,000; Referees: Ahmed Al-Shuwaili (IRQ), Preeda Muongmee (THA), Park Kyoung-jin (KOR)

30 August 2022	Japan	73–48	Kazakhstan	Okinawa
18:05	Scoring by quarter: 14–13, 13–14, 22–10, 24–11
	Pts: Nishida 13; Rebs: Fazekas 8 Asts: Kawamura 7	Boxscore	Pts: Bykov 18; Rebs: M. Marchuk 10; Asts: R. Marchuk	Arena: Okinawa Arena; Attendance: 5,337; Referees: Glenn Cornelio (PHI), Lee Kyoung-hwan (KOR), Haryanto Sutaryo (INA)

11 November 2022	Iran	72–81	China	Tehran
17:00	Scoring by quarter: 21–20, 13–22, 17–18, 21–21
	Pts: Yakhchali 24; Rebs: Haddadi 11; Asts: Jamshidi 5	Boxscore	Pts: Wang Z. 23; Rebs: Wang Z. 7 Asts: Zhao 7	Arena: Azadi Basketball Hall; Attendance: 500; Referees: Harja Jaladri (INA), Glenn Cornelio (PHI), Preeda Muongmee (THA)

11 November 2022	Kazakhstan	50–97	Australia	Astana
20:00	Scoring by quarter: 8–39, 17–19, 12–20, 13–19
	Pts: Kuanov 9 Rebs: Aitkali, Pan 7 Asts: Bykov, Kuanov 2	Boxscore	Pts: Froling 18; Rebs: Froling 11; Asts: Norton 7	Arena: Saryarka Velodrome; Attendance: 2,450; Referees: Yu Jung (TPE), Paul Skayem (LBN), Taha Al-Hashedi (YEM)

11 November 2022	Bahrain	74–87	Japan	Manama
19:05	Scoring by quarter: 10–24, 23–26, 24–13, 17–24
	Pts: M. Rashed 30; Rebs: Chism 15; Asts: M. Rashed 7	Boxscore	Pts: Harimoto 22; Rebs: Evans 9 Asts: Kawamura, Toews 4	Arena: Khalifa Sports City Stadium; Attendance: 700; Referees: Rabah Noujaim (LBN), Matthew Bathurst (NZL), Budi Marfan (INA)

Iran	20–0	Australia
Note: The game, originally scheduled for 14 November 2022 in Tehran, was not played as the Australian team decided not to travel Iran. It was forfeited in favour of Iran.

14 November 2022	Bahrain	67–80(OT)	China	Manama
19:00	Scoring by quarter: 12–18, 20–16, 14–19, 18–11, Overtime: 3–16
	Pts: Chism 23; Rebs: Chism 11; Asts: M. Rashed 6	Boxscore	Pts: Wang 27; Rebs: Wang 14; Asts: Zhao 9	Arena: Khalifa Sports City Stadium; Attendance: 850; Referees: Rabah Noujaim (LBN), Matthew Bathurst (NZL), Budi Marfan (INA)

14 November 2022	Kazakhstan	61–81	Japan	Astana
20:00	Scoring by quarter: 14–26, 13–29, 19–28, 15–8
	Pts: Murzagaliyev 14; Rebs: three players 6 Asts: Balashov 7	Boxscore	Pts: Yoshii 15; Rebs: Evans 7 Asts: Togashi 7	Arena: Saryarka Velodrome; Attendance: 1,738; Referees: Yu Jung (TPE), Paul Skayem (LBN), Mohammad Taha (JOR)

23 February 2023	Japan	96–61	Iran	Takasaki
15:00	Scoring by quarter: 22–16, 30–13, 23–16, 21–16
	Pts: Kanechika 20; Rebs: Hawkinson 11; Asts: Toews 5	Boxscore	Pts: Jamshidi, Yakhchali 15; Rebs: Kazemi 8 Asts: Jamshidi, Kazemi 3	Arena: Takasaki Arena; Attendance: 3,200; Referees: Glenn Cornelio (PHI), Saif Al-Dossari (QAT), Park Kyoung-jin (KOR)

23 February 2023	Australia	83–51	Bahrain	Melbourne
19:00	Scoring by quarter: 25–19, 27–5, 7–19, 24–8
	Pts: Blanchfield 20; Rebs: McCarron 8 Asts: Adnam, McCarron 5	Boxscore	Pts: Chism 15; Rebs: Chism 11; Asts: Isa 5	Arena: State Basketball Centre; Attendance: 2,000; Referees: Lee Kyoung-hwan (KOR), Leong Chuen Wing (SGP), Chan Owe Shiong (MAS)

23 February 2023	China	71–59	Kazakhstan	Tsuen Wan, Hong Kong
19:30	Scoring by quarter: 21–12, 22–10, 16–18, 12–19
	Pts: Zhou Q. 16; Rebs: Zhou Q. 12; Asts: Zhou P. 3	Boxscore	Pts: Murzagaliyev 13; Rebs: Chsherbak 8 Asts: Shcherbak, Murzagaliyev 5	Arena: Tsuen Wan Sports Centre; Attendance: 1,150; Referees: Ahmed Al-Bulushi (OMA), Mohammad Al-Amiri (KUW), Preeda Muongmee (THA)

26 February 2023	China	86–74	Iran	Tsuen Wan, Hong Kong
12:00	Scoring by quarter: 20–21, 25–27, 16–10, 25-16
	Pts: Wu 18; Rebs: Zhou Q. 7 Asts: Zhao J. 8	Boxscore	Pts: Yakhchali 28; Rebs: Kazemi 10; Asts: Jamshidi, Yakhchali 4	Arena: Tsuen Wan Sports Centre; Attendance: 1,175; Referees: Mohammad Al-Amiri (KUW), Ahmed Al-Bulushi (OMA), Preeda Muongmee (THA)

26 February 2023	Japan	95–72	Bahrain	Takasaki
14:05	Scoring by quarter: 32–19, 19–16, 22–22, 22–15
	Pts: Hawkinson 22; Rebs: Hawkinson 10; Asts: Kawamura 9	Boxscore	Pts: M. Rashed 15; Rebs: Chism 13; Asts: Chism, M. Rashed 4	Arena: Takasaki Arena; Attendance: 3,317; Referees: Saif Al-Dossari (QAT), Park Kyoung-jin (KOR), Glenn Cornelio (PHI)

26 February 2023	Australia	98–53	Kazakhstan	Melbourne
15:00	Scoring by quarter: 21–13, 25–14, 33–11, 19–15
	Pts: Blanchfield 31; Rebs: Kay, Peatling 6 Asts: McCarron 5	Boxscore	Pts: Aitkali 12; Rebs: Gavrilov 7 Asts: five players 2	Arena: State Basketball Centre; Attendance: 3,200; Referees: Lee Kyoung-hwan (KOR), Chan Owe Shiong (MAS), Leong Chuen Wing (SGP)

== Statistical leaders ==
=== Player averages ===
Category	Player	Team	Average
Points	Amir Hinton	Syria	26.7
Rebounds	Arsalan Kazemi	Iran	11.1
Assists	Freddy Ibrahim	Jordan	7.3
Steals	Amir Hinton	Syria	3.0
Blocks	Wayne Chism	Bahrain	2.0
Blocks	Mohammed Al-Suwailem	Saudi Arabia	2.0
Minutes	Amir Hinton	Syria	33.7
Efficiency	Amir Hinton	Syria	24.5

=== Team averages ===
Category	Team	Average
Points	New Zealand	92.6
Rebounds	Australia	45.4
Assists	Australia	25.8
Steals	Lebanon	11.4
Blocks	Philippines	4.2
Efficiency	Australia	120.0
