= 2022 FIBA Asia Cup =

30th continental basketball championship in Asia

Tournament details
- Host country: Indonesia
- City: Jakarta
- Dates: 12–24 July
- Teams: 16 (from 1 confederation)
- Venue: 1 (in 1 host city)

Final positions
- Champions: Australia (2nd title)
- Runners-up: Lebanon
- Third place: New Zealand
- Fourth place: Jordan

Tournament statistics
- Games played: 36
- Attendance: 47,173 (1,310 per game)
- MVP: (Lebanon) Wael Arakji
- Top scorer: (Lebanon) Wael Arakji (26.0 points per game)

Official website
- 2022 FIBA Asia Cup

The 2022 FIBA Asia Cup was the 30th edition of the FIBA Asia Cup, the continental basketball championship in Asia. The tournament was organised by FIBA Asia.

Originally intended to be the 2021 edition, the tournament was initially scheduled to take place between 3 and 15 August 2021, but it was postponed due to 17 to 29 August 2021 to avoid scheduling conflict with the 2020 Summer Olympics which was postponed by a year due to the COVID-19 pandemic. It was later postponed again to 12 to 24 July 2022.

Indonesia was the host for second time after staging the 1993 edition. Australia defended their title with a win over Lebanon, while New Zealand grabbed their first medal after winning bronze with a win against Jordan.

== Host selection ==
On 7 October 2020, Indonesian Youth and Sports Minister Zainudin Amali confirmed that FIBA had entrusted Indonesia to host the upcoming Asia Cup in 2021. However, an official announcement by FIBA was yet to be made at that time. On 18 December, FIBA confirmed that the country would host the tournament.

However, due to a surge of COVID-19 cases in Indonesia amid the pandemic as of July 2021, FIBA considered postponing the competition to 2022. Jordan had offered to host the tournament as an alternative.

On 23 July 2021, FIBA announced that the Asia Cup was rescheduled to July 2022.

== Venue ==
Jakarta	2022 FIBA Asia Cup (Indonesia)
Istora Gelora Bung Karno	2022 FIBA Asia Cup (Indonesia)
Capacity: 7,166	2022 FIBA Asia Cup (Indonesia)

== Format ==
16 qualified teams played in the main round. They were divided into four groups of four teams. Every group winner gained direct access to the quarterfinal, while the runners-up played a playoff game.

== Qualification ==
The qualification started on 23 February 2018. Teams that did not manage to advance to the 2019 FIBA Basketball World Cup qualification and the teams that did not participate in it played in the first round of the pre-qualifiers. Pre-qualifiers were held in the western and eastern regions to determine the eight teams who will join the 16 teams that participated in the 2017 FIBA Asia Cup. Below is the list of qualified teams to the 2022 FIBA Asia Cup. Indonesia qualified by virtue of being confirmed as host on 18 December 2020, although they have entered the qualification process prior to the confirmation of their hosting.

=== Qualified teams ===
Team	Qualification method	Date of qualification	App	Last	Best placement in tournament
Lebanon	Group D top two	29 November 2020	10th	2017	Runners-up (2001, 2005, 2007)
Bahrain	Group D top two	29 November 2020	9th	2013	10th place (1997)
Indonesia	Host nation	18 December 2020	18th	2011	4th place (1967)
Iran	Group E top two	12 June 2021	18th	2017	Champions (2007, 2009, 2013)
Kazakhstan	Group F top two	12 June 2021	10th	2017	4th place (2007)
Jordan	Group F top two	13 June 2021	16th	2017	Runners-up (2011)
Syria	Group E top two	14 June 2021	7th	2017	4th place (2001)
Philippines	Group A top two	17 June 2021	28th	2017	Champions (1960, 1963, 1967, 1973, 1985)
South Korea	Group A top two	17 June 2021	30th	2017	Champions (1969, 1997)
China	Group B top two	20 June 2021	23rd	2017	Champions (1975, 77, 79, 81, 83, 87, 89, 91, 93, 95, 99, 2001, 03, 05, 11, 15)
Japan	Group B top two	20 June 2021	29th	2017	Champions (1965, 1971)
Australia	Group C top two	20 June 2021	2nd	2017	Champions (2017)
New Zealand	Group C top two	20 June 2021	2nd	2017	4th place (2017)
Saudi Arabia	Group H top two	22 August 2021	9th	2013	3rd place (1999)
India	Group H top two	22 August 2021	26th	2017	4th place (1975)
Chinese Taipei	Group G winners	28 August 2021	25th	2017	Runners-up (1960, 1963)

== Draw ==
The draw was scheduled to take place on 8 December 2021, but was postponed due to COVID-19 pandemic-related travel restrictions by Indonesia. The draw took place on 18 February 2022.

=== Seeding ===
The seeding was announced on 15 February 2022 and was based on the FIBA World Rankings of December 2021. Hosts Indonesia had the right to choose their group before the remaining Pot 4 teams were drawn.

Pot 1
Team	Pos
Australia	3
Iran	23
New Zealand	27
China	29

Pot 2
Team	Pos
South Korea	30
Philippines	33
Japan	37
Jordan	39

Pot 3
Team	Pos
Lebanon	55
Chinese Taipei	66
Kazakhstan	70
Saudi Arabia	79

Pot 4
Team	Pos
India	80
Syria	85
Indonesia	91
Bahrain	104

== Squads ==
Each team has a roster of twelve players. A team may opt to allocate a roster spot to a naturalized player.

== Preliminary round ==
All times are local (UTC+7).

=== Group A ===
Pos	Team	Pld	W	L	PF	PA	PD	Pts	Qualification
1	Australia	3	3	0	232	165	+67	6	Quarterfinals
2	Jordan	3	2	1	208	207	+1	5	Playoffs
3	Indonesia (H)	3	1	2	198	206	−8	4	Playoffs
4	Saudi Arabia	3	0	3	170	230	−60	3	

Source: FIBA
Rules for classification: 1) Points; 2) Head-to-head results; 3) Points difference; 4) Points scored.
(H) Hosts

12 July 2022
15:00

Boxscore

Jordan	60–78	Australia
Scoring by quarter: 12–27, 14–25, 19–8, 15–18
Pts: Tucker 20; Rebs: Al-Dwairi 13; Asts: Al-Dwairi, Ibrahim 6		Pts: Maker 23; Rebs: Froling, Maker 8 Asts: McDowell-White 7

Istora Gelora Bung Karno, Jakarta
Attendance: 95
Referees: Ahmed Al-Shuwaili (IRQ), Glenn Cornelio (PHI), Mohammad Al-Amiri (KUW)

12 July 2022
17:30

Boxscore

Saudi Arabia	54–80	Indonesia
Scoring by quarter: 13–18, 17–26, 15–17, 9–19
Pts: Mo. Al-Marwani 15; Rebs: Kadi 10; Asts: Belal 5		Pts: Bolden 32; Rebs: Bolden 16; Asts: Prastawa 9

Istora Gelora Bung Karno, Jakarta
Attendance: 3,625
Referees: Takaki Kato (JPN), Ahmed Al-Bulushi (OMA), Matthew Bathurst (NZL)

14 July 2022
11:00

Boxscore

Australia	76–52	Saudi Arabia
Scoring by quarter: 15–18, 24–7, 17–15, 20–12
Pts: Maker 16; Rebs: Froling 7 Asts: McDowell-White 6		Pts: Belal 16; Rebs: Ma. Al-Marwani 14; Asts: Abdel-Gabar, Ma. Al-Marwani 3

Istora Gelora Bung Karno, Jakarta
Attendance: 100
Referees: Yu Jung (TPE), Mohammad Doost (IRI), Park Kyoung-jin (KOR)

14 July 2022
17:30

Boxscore

Indonesia	65–74	Jordan
Scoring by quarter: 15–17, 23–22, 10–18, 17–17
Pts: Xzavierro 19; Rebs: Bolden 13; Asts: Saputera 4		Pts: Tucker 22; Rebs: Al-Dwairi 16; Asts: Ibrahim 6

Istora Gelora Bung Karno, Jakarta
Attendance: 5,500
Referees: Rabah Noujaim (LBN), Mohammad Al-Amiri (KUW), Glenn Cornelio (PHI)

16 July 2022
15:00

Boxscore

Saudi Arabia	64–74	Jordan
Scoring by quarter: 21–19, 7–20, 15–20, 21–15
Pts: Abdel-Gabar 19; Rebs: Ma. Al-Marwani 14; Asts: Ma. Al-Marwani 4		Pts: Al-Dwairi 16; Rebs: Al-Dwairi 12; Asts: Ibrahim 5

Istora Gelora Bung Karno, Jakarta
Attendance: 100
Referees: Takaki Kato (JPN), Mohammad Al-Amiri (KUW), Glenn Cornelio (PHI)

16 July 2022
17:30

Boxscore

Australia	78–53	Indonesia
Scoring by quarter: 11–16, 23–8, 23–18, 21–11
Pts: Proctor 14; Rebs: Maker 9 Asts: McCarron 5		Pts: Bolden 18; Rebs: Bolden 10; Asts: Grahita 3

Istora Gelora Bung Karno, Jakarta
Attendance: 5,500
Referees: Yevgeniy Mikheyev (KAZ), Ahmed Al-Bulushi (OMA), Matthew Bathurst (NZL)

=== Group B ===
Pos	Team	Pld	W	L	PF	PA	PD	Pts	Qualification
1	South Korea	3	3	0	258	227	+31	6	Quarterfinals
2	China	3	2	1	256	252	+4	5	Playoffs
3	Chinese Taipei	3	1	2	255	266	−11	4	Playoffs
4	Bahrain	3	0	3	236	260	−24	3	

Source: FIBA
Rules for classification: 1) Points; 2) Head-to-head results; 3) Points difference; 4) Points scored.

12 July 2022
11:00

Boxscore

Chinese Taipei	102–84	Bahrain
Scoring by quarter: 22–15, 23–18, 32–20, 25–31
Pts: Liu 29; Rebs: Artino 9 Asts: Chen Y. 6		Pts: Chism 24; Rebs: Chism 18; Asts: Alderazi 7

Istora Gelora Bung Karno, Jakarta
Attendance: 2,000
Referees: Harja Jaladri (INA), Mohammad Doost (IRI), Budi Marfan (INA)

12 July 2022
20:00

Boxscore

China	81–93	South Korea
Scoring by quarter: 19–19, 26–24, 14–22, 22–28
Pts: Gu, Zhao 22; Rebs: Fan 11; Asts: Sun 7		Pts: Ra 25; Rebs: Ra 14; Asts: Heo H. 6

Istora Gelora Bung Karno, Jakarta
Attendance: 1,647
Referees: Rabah Noujaim (LBN), Yevgeniy Mikheyev (KAZ), Wissam Zein (SYR)

14 July 2022
15:00

Boxscore

South Korea	87–73	Chinese Taipei
Scoring by quarter: 22–20, 29–15, 22–21, 14–17
Pts: Ra 19; Rebs: Ra 12; Asts: Choi, Lee D.S. 5		Pts: Artino 18; Rebs: Artino 7 Asts: Chen Y. 7

Istora Gelora Bung Karno, Jakarta
Attendance: 843
Referees: Takaki Kato (JPN), Yevgeniy Mikheyev (KAZ), Wissam Zein (SYR)

14 July 2022
20:00

Boxscore

Bahrain	79–80	China
Scoring by quarter: 18–29, 23–16, 20–21, 18–14
Pts: Chism 23; Rebs: Chism 14; Asts: Isa, M. Rashed 4		Pts: Gu 22; Rebs: Wang 7 Asts: Hu, Zhao 5

Istora Gelora Bung Karno, Jakarta
Attendance: 300
Referees: Ahmed Al-Shuwaili (IRQ), Ahmed Al-Bulushi (OMA), Matthew Bathurst (NZL)

16 July 2022
11:00

Boxscore

South Korea	78–73	Bahrain
Scoring by quarter: 19–12, 19–30, 22–19, 18–12
Pts: Choi 15; Rebs: Ra 8 Asts: Heo H. 5		Pts: Isa 20; Rebs: Chism 20; Asts: Isa 4

Istora Gelora Bung Karno, Jakarta
Attendance: 440
Referees: James Boyer (AUS), Mohammad Doost (IRI), Budi Marfan (INA)

16 July 2022
20:00

Boxscore

Chinese Taipei	80–95	China
Scoring by quarter: 19–28, 24–26, 22–20, 15–21
Pts: Lin T. 30; Rebs: Artino 12; Asts: Chen Y., Lin T. 5		Pts: Wang 17; Rebs: Zhai 9 Asts: Sun 7

Istora Gelora Bung Karno, Jakarta
Attendance: 1,300
Referees: Rabah Noujaim (LBN), Ahmed Al-Shuwaili (IRQ), Wissam Zein (SYR)

=== Group C ===
Pos	Team	Pld	W	L	PF	PA	PD	Pts	Qualification
1	Iran	3	3	0	264	203	+61	6	Quarterfinals
2	Japan	3	2	1	293	212	+81	5	Playoffs
3	Syria	3	1	2	200	264	−64	4	Playoffs
4	Kazakhstan	3	0	3	195	273	−78	3	

Source: FIBA
Rules for classification: 1) Points; 2) Head-to-head results; 3) Points difference; 4) Points scored.

13 July 2022
15:00

Boxscore

Iran	80–67	Syria
Scoring by quarter: 22–18, 22–20, 21–12, 15–17
Pts: Yakhchali 31; Rebs: Haddadi 20; Asts: Haddadi, Yakhchali 4		Pts: three players 12; Rebs: Adribe 10; Asts: Arbasha 6

Istora Gelora Bung Karno, Jakarta
Attendance: 100
Referees: Ahmed Al-Shuwaili (IRQ), Ahmed Al-Bulushi (OMA), Zhang Xiao (CHN)

13 July 2022
17:30

Boxscore

Japan	100–68	Kazakhstan
Scoring by quarter: 23–22, 22–26, 29–11, 26–9
Pts: Watanabe 21; Rebs: Evans 9 Asts: Kawamura 8		Pts: R. Marchuk 15; Rebs: Gavrilov 8 Asts: Murzagaliyev 5

Istora Gelora Bung Karno, Jakarta
Attendance: 100
Referees: Harja Jaladri (INA), Mohammad Al-Amiri (KUW), Mohammad Taha (JOR)

15 July 2022
11:00

Boxscore

Kazakhstan	60–96	Iran
Scoring by quarter: 24–27, 9–15, 9–28, 18–26
Pts: Kuanov, M. Marchuk 11; Rebs: Bykov 7 Asts: Balashov, Kuanov 4		Pts: Jamshidi 16; Rebs: Haddadi 10; Asts: Mashayeki 6

Istora Gelora Bung Karno, Jakarta
Attendance: 21
Referees: Mohammad Al-Amiri (KUW), Ahmed Al-Bulushi (OMA), Mohammad Taha (JOR)

15 July 2022
17:30

Boxscore

Syria	56–117	Japan
Scoring by quarter: 9–29, 18–39, 15–28, 14–21
Pts: Oubeid 20; Rebs: Al-Hamwi, Alsati 8 Asts: Issa 3		Pts: Suda 33; Rebs: three players 6 Asts: Togashi 7

Istora Gelora Bung Karno, Jakarta
Attendance: 150
Referees: Harja Jaladri (INA), James Boyer (AUS), Budi Marfan (INA)

17 July 2022
15:00

Boxscore

Kazakhstan	67–77	Syria
Scoring by quarter: 26–16, 7–21, 13–24, 21–16
Pts: Balashov 16; Rebs: Gavrilov 7 Asts: Kuanov 5		Pts: Cheikh 20; Rebs: Al-Hamwi 16; Asts: Oubeid 9

Istora Gelora Bung Karno, Jakarta
Attendance: 100
Referees: Yu Jung (TPE), Ahmed Al-Bulushi (OMA), Park Kyoung-jin (KOR)

17 July 2022
17:30

Boxscore

Iran	88–76	Japan
Scoring by quarter: 27–24, 21–10, 20–12, 20–30
Pts: Haddadi, Yakhchali 21; Rebs: Haddadi 11; Asts: Haddadi 4		Pts: Watanabe 17; Rebs: Watanabe 10; Asts: Toews 8

Istora Gelora Bung Karno, Jakarta
Attendance: 1,000
Referees: Mohammad Taha (JOR), Ahmed Al-Shuwaili (IRQ), James Boyer (AUS)

=== Group D ===
Pos	Team	Pld	W	L	PF	PA	PD	Pts	Qualification
1	Lebanon	3	3	0	285	215	+70	6	Quarterfinals
2	New Zealand	3	2	1	264	208	+56	5	Playoffs
3	Philippines	3	1	2	256	246	+10	4	Playoffs
4	India	3	0	3	169	305	−136	3	

Source: FIBA
Rules for classification: 1) Points; 2) Head-to-head results; 3) Points difference; 4) Points scored.

13 July 2022
11:00

Boxscore

India	47–100	New Zealand
Scoring by quarter: 12–30, 9–34, 14–16, 12–20
Pts: Muthu Krishnan 13; Rebs: Rawat 12; Asts: Hafeez 3		Pts: Mennenga 21; Rebs: Mennenga 9 Asts: Britt, Cameron 5

Istora Gelora Bung Karno, Jakarta
Attendance: 100
Referees: Takaki Kato (JPN), Wissam Zein (SYR), Budi Marfan (INA)

13 July 2022
20:00

Boxscore

Lebanon	95–80	Philippines
Scoring by quarter: 22–27, 24–12, 33–19, 16–22
Pts: Arakji 20; Rebs: Gyokchyan 8 Asts: Arakji 4		Pts: Belangel 17; Rebs: Tamayo 6 Asts: Quiambao, K. Ravena 4

Istora Gelora Bung Karno, Jakarta
Attendance: 200
Referees: Yu Jung (TPE), James Boyer (AUS), Park Kyoung-jin (KOR)

15 July 2022
15:00

Boxscore

Philippines	101–59	India
Scoring by quarter: 20–13, 31–20, 31–10, 19–16
Pts: Navarro 18; Rebs: Lopez, T. Ravena 5 Asts: Quiambao 9		Pts: Hafeez 14; Rebs: Rawat 9 Asts: Hafeez 3

Istora Gelora Bung Karno, Jakarta
Attendance: 100
Referees: Takaki Kato (JPN), Yevgeniy Mikheyev (KAZ), Zhang Xiao (CHN)

15 July 2022
20:00

Boxscore

New Zealand	72–86	Lebanon
Scoring by quarter: 22–17, 14–22, 17–18, 19–29
Pts: Fahrensohn 21; Rebs: Timmins 9 Asts: Cameron 3		Pts: Arakji 25; Rebs: Arledge 9 Asts: Arakji 7

Istora Gelora Bung Karno, Jakarta
Attendance: 200
Referees: Yu Jung (TPE), Ahmed Al-Shuwaili (IRQ), Park Kyoung-jin (KOR)

17 July 2022
11:00

Boxscore

India	63–104	Lebanon
Scoring by quarter: 14–26, 9–31, 17–27, 23–20
Pts: Hafeez, Tomar 11; Rebs: Tomar 7 Asts: Hafeez 6		Pts: Khayat 15; Rebs: Ezzedine 7 Asts: Mezher 8

Istora Gelora Bung Karno, Jakarta
Attendance: 100
Referees: Yevgeniy Mikheyev (KAZ), Wissam Zein (SYR), Budi Marfan (INA)

17 July 2022
20:00

Boxscore

Philippines	75–92	New Zealand
Scoring by quarter: 16–30, 22–16, 14–21, 23–25
Pts: K. Ravena 17; Rebs: K. Ravena 6 Asts: four players 3		Pts: Cameron 18; Rebs: Mennenga 14; Asts: Smith-Milner 5

Istora Gelora Bung Karno, Jakarta
Attendance: 852
Referees: Mohammad Al-Amiri (KUW), Harja Jaladri (INA), Zhang Xiao (CHN)

== Final round ==
=== Bracket ===
Playoffs
19 July
Japan	102
Philippines	81
19 July
New Zealand	97
Syria	58
18 July
Jordan	97
Chinese Taipei	96
18 July
China	108
Indonesia	58

Quarter-finals
21 July
Australia	99
Japan	85
21 July
South Korea	78
New Zealand	88
20 July
Iran	76
Jordan	91
20 July
Lebanon	72
China	69

Semi-finals
23 July
Australia	85
New Zealand	76
23 July
Jordan	85
Lebanon	86

Final
24 July
Australia	75
Lebanon	73
Third place
24 July
New Zealand	83
Jordan	75

=== Playoffs ===
18 July 2022
17:30

Boxscore

China	108–58	Indonesia
Scoring by quarter: 29–11, 30–10, 18–23, 31–14
Pts: Gu 23; Rebs: Zhou 9 Asts: Sun 12		Pts: Bolden 21; Rebs: Bolden 6 Asts: Prastawa 6

Istora Gelora Bung Karno, Jakarta
Attendance: 4,500
Referees: Yevgeniy Mikheyev (KAZ), Mohammad Al-Amiri (KUW), Wissam Zein (SYR)

18 July 2022
20:00

Boxscore

Jordan	97–96	Chinese Taipei
Scoring by quarter: 23–25, 19–24, 26–20, 29–27
Pts: Tucker 36; Rebs: Al-Dwairi 15; Asts: Al-Dwairi 6		Pts: Chen Y. 20; Rebs: Artino 8 Asts: Chen Y. 5

Istora Gelora Bung Karno, Jakarta
Attendance: 300
Referees: Park Kyoung-jin (KOR), Ahmed Al-Bulushi (OMA), James Boyer (AUS)

19 July 2022
17:30

Boxscore

New Zealand	97–58	Syria
Scoring by quarter: 25–6, 28–15, 16–17, 28–20
Pts: Murray 16; Rebs: Cameron 8 Asts: Britt 6		Pts: Bakar, Idelbi 10; Rebs: Cheikh 8 Asts: Oubeid 3

Istora Gelora Bung Karno, Jakarta
Attendance: 100
Referees: Yu Jung (TPE), Yevgeniy Mikheyev (KAZ), Zhang Xiao (CHN)

19 July 2022
20:00

Boxscore

Japan	102–81	Philippines
Scoring by quarter: 32–16, 18–18, 27–29, 25–18
Pts: Togashi 18; Rebs: Watanabe 9 Asts: Togashi 6		Pts: Parks 16; Rebs: Quiambao 7 Asts: four players 3

Istora Gelora Bung Karno, Jakarta
Attendance: 1,000
Referees: Rabah Noujaim (LBN), Ahmed Al-Shuwaili (IRQ), Mohammad Doost (IRI)

=== Quarterfinals ===
20 July 2022
17:30

Boxscore

Iran	76–91	Jordan
Scoring by quarter: 18–24, 20–20, 29–20, 9–27
Pts: Jamshidi 23; Rebs: Haddadi 16; Asts: Jamshidi 5		Pts: Tucker 29; Rebs: Al-Dwairi 10; Asts: Abbas 5

Istora Gelora Bung Karno, Jakarta
Attendance: 300
Referees: Yevgeniy Mikheyev (KAZ), Mohammad Al-Amiri (KUW), Glenn Cornelio (PHI)

20 July 2022
20:00

Boxscore

Lebanon	72–69	China
Scoring by quarter: 17–13, 22–17, 18–15, 15–24
Pts: Arakji 32; Rebs: Arledge 16; Asts: El Darwich, Gyokchyan 3		Pts: Zhou 22; Rebs: Zhou 21; Asts: Sun 6

Istora Gelora Bung Karno, Jakarta
Attendance: 1,000
Referees: Ahmed Al-Shuwaili (IRQ), James Boyer (AUS), Wissam Zein (SYR)

21 July 2022
17:30

Boxscore

Australia	99–85	Japan
Scoring by quarter: 33–22, 16–12, 26–20, 24–31
Pts: Maker 21; Rebs: Maker 13; Asts: McCarron 9		Pts: Tominaga 33; Rebs: Inoue 6 Asts: Kawamura 6

Istora Gelora Bung Karno, Jakarta
Attendance: 1,000
Referees: Yu Jung (TPE), Harja Jaladri (INA), Mohammad Doost (IRI)

21 July 2022
20:00

Boxscore

South Korea	78–88	New Zealand
Scoring by quarter: 23–26, 23–14, 14–20, 18–28
Pts: Ra 19; Rebs: Ra 14; Asts: Choi 7		Pts: Cameron 22; Rebs: Timmins 14; Asts: Cameron 8

Istora Gelora Bung Karno, Jakarta
Attendance: 1,000
Referees: Rabah Noujaim (LBN), Ahmed Al-Bulushi (OMA), Mohammad Taha (JOR)

=== Semifinals ===
23 July 2022
17:30

Boxscore

Australia	85–76	New Zealand
Scoring by quarter: 23–19, 26–18, 17–17, 19–22
Pts: Maker 18; Rebs: Maker 9 Asts: McDowell-White 7		Pts: Hunt, Timmins 16; Rebs: Timmins 8 Asts: Cameron, Perrott-Hunt 4

Istora Gelora Bung Karno, Jakarta
Attendance: 3,000
Referees: Ahmed Al-Shuwaili (IRQ), Mohammad Al-Amiri (KUW), Glenn Cornelio (PHI)

23 July 2022
20:00

Boxscore

Jordan	85–86	Lebanon
Scoring by quarter: 21–17, 20–29, 23–16, 21–24
Pts: Abu Hawwas 24; Rebs: Tucker 9 Asts: Ibrahim 4		Pts: Arakji 25; Rebs: El Darwich, Haidar 8 Asts: Gyokchyan 4

Istora Gelora Bung Karno, Jakarta
Attendance: 3,000
Referees: Yu Jung (TPE), Yevgeniy Mikheyev (KAZ), Harja Jaladri (INA)

=== Third place game ===
24 July 2022
17:30

Boxscore

Jordan	75–83	New Zealand
Scoring by quarter: 22–20, 20–12, 24–27, 9–24
Pts: Abbaas, Abu Hawwas 19; Rebs: Abbas 9 Asts: Ibrahim 8		Pts: Smith-Milner 25; Rebs: Hunt 10; Asts: Britt, Cameron 7

Istora Gelora Bung Karno, Jakarta
Attendance: 2,500
Referees: Rabah Noujaim (LBN), Ahmed Al-Shuwaili (IRQ), James Boyer (AUS)

=== Final ===
24 July 2022
20:00

Boxscore

Lebanon	73–75	Australia
Scoring by quarter: 10–22, 18–16, 15–19, 30–18
Pts: Arakji 28; Rebs: Haidar 9 Asts: Arakji 5		Pts: Maker 14; Rebs: Maker 8 Asts: McDowell-White 6

Istora Gelora Bung Karno, Jakarta
Attendance: 5,000
Referees: Yu Jung (TPE), Mohammad Doost (IRI), Harja Jaladri (INA)

== Final standings ==
Rank	Team	Record	FIBA World Ranking		
Rank	Team	Record	Before	After	Change
1st place, gold medalist(s)	Australia	6–0	3	3	0
2nd place, silver medalist(s)	Lebanon	5–1	55	43	12
3rd place, bronze medalist(s)	New Zealand	5–2	27	24	3
4	Jordan	4–3	39	35	4
5	Iran	3–1	23	21	2
6	South Korea	3–1	30	34	−4
7	Japan	3–2	37	38	−1
8	China	3–2	29	27	2
9	Philippines	1–3	33	41	–8
10	Chinese Taipei	1–3	66	68	−2
11	Indonesia	1–3	91	80	11
12	Syria	1–3	85	70	15
13	Bahrain	0–3	104	86	18
14	Saudi Arabia	0–3	79	73	6
15	Kazakhstan	0–3	70	65	5
16	India	0–3	80	85	−5

== Statistics ==
=== Players ===
Points

Name	PPG
(Lebanon) Wael Arakji	26.0
(Indonesia) Marques Bolden	21.8
(Iran) Behnam Yakhchali	21.0
(Jordan) Dar Tucker	20.5
(South Korea) Ra Gun-ah	19.3

Rebounds

Name	RPG
(Iran) Hamed Haddadi	14.3
(South Korea) Ra Gun-ah	12.0
(Jordan) Ahmad Al-Dwairi	11.8
(Indonesia) Marques Bolden	11.3
(Chinese Taipei) Will Artino	9.0

Assists

Name	APG
(China) Sun Minghui	7.0
(Australia) Will McDowell-White	5.8
(Chinese Taipei) Chen Ying-chun	5.8
(Australia) Mitch McCarron	5.5
(Jordan) Freddy Ibrahim	5.1

Blocks

Name	BPG
(Indonesia) Marques Bolden	2.8
(Iran) Hamed Haddadi	2.0
(Jordan) Ahmad Al-Dwairi	1.7
(Syria) Abdulwahab Al-Hamwi	1.5
(Australia) Thon Maker	1.3

Steals

Name	SPG
(Chinese Taipei) Chen Ying-chun	3.5
(Iran) Arsalan Kazemi	3.5
(South Korea) Lee Dae-sung	2.3
(Japan) Yuki Kawamura	2.2
(Lebanon) Sergio El Darwich	2.2

Efficiency

Name	EFFPG
(Indonesia) Marques Bolden	28.5
(Iran) Hamed Haddadi	26.0
(Lebanon) Wael Arakji	24.4
(Jordan) Ahmad Al-Dwairi	23.2
(South Korea) Ra Gun-ah	23.0

=== Teams ===
Points

Team	PPG
Japan	96.0
Chinese Taipei	87.8
New Zealand	86.9
China	86.6
Lebanon	86.0

Rebounds

Team	RPG
New Zealand	49.6
Iran	46.8
China	43.0
Australia	42.5
South Korea	42.5

Assists

Team	APG
Australia	22.3
Japan	21.4
Iran	21.3
New Zealand	21.0
China	20.0

Blocks

Team	BPG
Australia	4.5
Indonesia	3.8
Philippines	3.8
South Korea	3.5
Iran	3.3

Steals

Team	SPG
Chinese Taipei	11.8
Lebanon	10.8
Japan	10.6
Iran	10.0
Australia	8.0

Efficiency

Team	EFFPG
Japan	110.2
Iran	104.3
Australia	104.0
China	100.6
New Zealand	100.4

== Awards ==
2022 Asian champions

Australia
2nd title

The awards were announced on 24 July.

Position	Player
All-Tournament Team	(Lebanon) Wael Arakji
All-Tournament Team	(Australia) Mitch McCarron
All-Tournament Team	(New Zealand) Tohi Smith-Milner
All-Tournament Team	(Australia) Thon Maker
All-Tournament Team	(China) Zhou Qi
MVP	(Lebanon) Wael Arakji

== See also ==
- 2021 FIBA Women's Asia Cup
