= 2023 FIBA Basketball World Cup Group B =

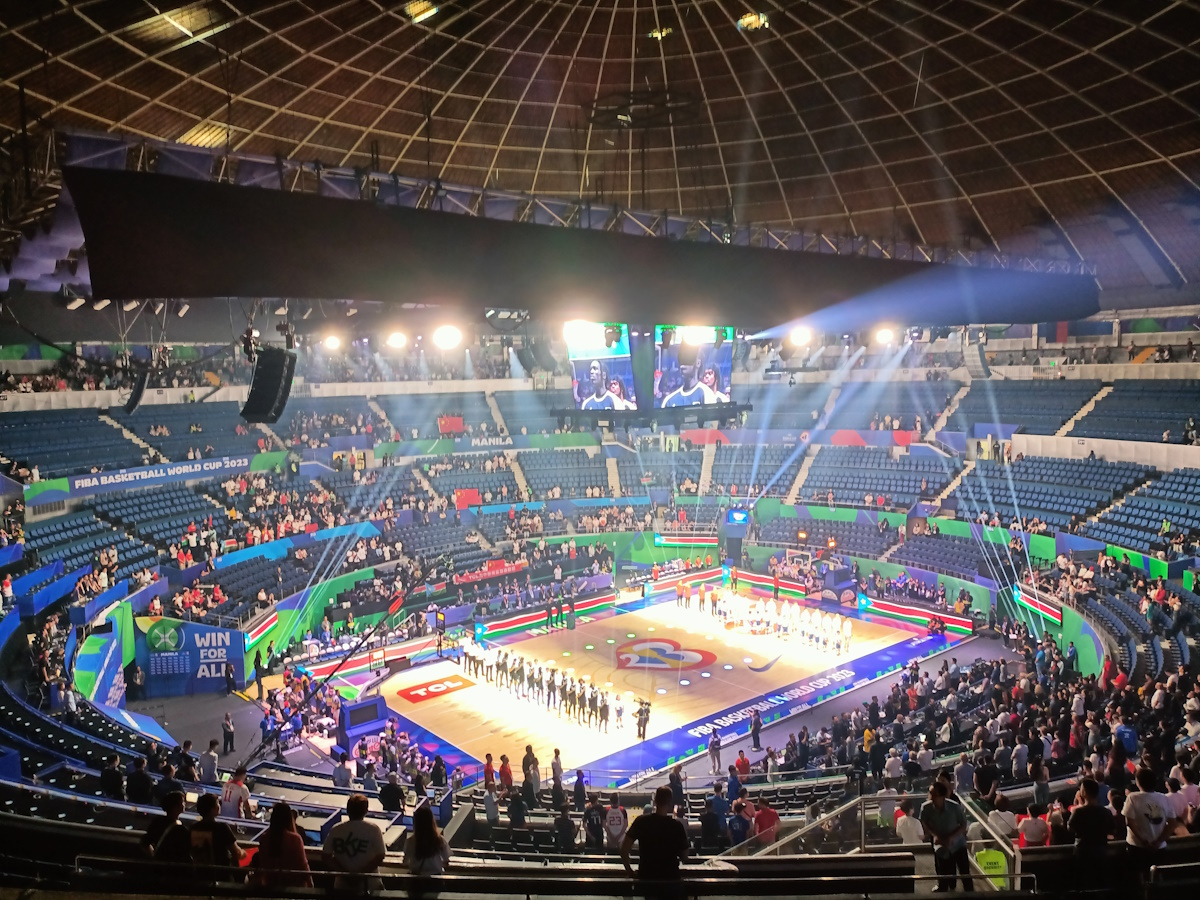
Opening of the China vs. South Sudan match at the Araneta Coliseum.

Group B was one of eight groups of the preliminary round of the 2023 FIBA Basketball World Cup. It took place from 26 to 30 August 2023, and consisted of China, Puerto Rico, Serbia, and South Sudan. Each team played each other once, for a total of three games per team, with all games played at the Araneta Coliseum, Quezon City, Philippines. The top two teams advanced to the second round and the bottom two teams qualified for the classification rounds.

== Teams ==
Team	Qualification		Appearance			Best performance	WR
Team	As	Date	Last	Total	Streak	Best performance	WR
South Sudan	African Group F top two	24 February 2023	—	1	1	Debut	63
Serbia	European Group I top three	27 February 2023	2019	7	7	Champions (1998, 2002)	6
China	Asian Group F top three	14 November 2022	2019	10	2	8th place (1994)	27
Puerto Rico	Americas Group F top three	26 February 2023	2019	15	10	4th place (1990)	21

== Standings ==
Pos	Team	Pld	W	L	PF	PA	PD	Pts	Qualification
1	Serbia	3	3	0	314	223	+91	6	Second round
2	Puerto Rico	3	2	1	285	279	+6	5	Second round
3	South Sudan	3	1	2	268	285	−17	4	17th–32nd classification
4	China	3	0	3	221	301	−80	3	17th–32nd classification

Source: FIBA
Rules for classification: Tiebreakers

== Games ==
All times are local (UTC+8).

=== South Sudan vs. Puerto Rico ===
This was the first competitive game between South Sudan and Puerto Rico.

26 August 2023
16:00

Boxscore

South Sudan	96–101 (OT)	Puerto Rico
Scoring by quarter: 29–24, 23–18, 15–18, 14–21, Overtime: 15–20
Pts: Jones 38; Rebs: Gabriel, Shayok 7 Asts: Jones 11		Pts: Thompson Jr. 21; Rebs: Thompson Jr. 13; Asts: Waters 11

Araneta Coliseum, Quezon City
Attendance: 3,166
Referees: Guilherme Locatelli (BRA), Luis Castillo (ESP), Carlos Peralta (ECU)

=== Serbia vs. China ===
This was the first game between Serbia and China in the World Cup. The Serbians won two of the three Olympic Games matches: 1996 as Yugoslavia and 2016 as Serbia. The Chinese won in the 2004 Olympics.

26 August 2023
20:00

Boxscore

Serbia	105–63	China
Scoring by quarter: 25–14, 30–20, 22–13, 28–16
Pts: Bogdanović, Marinković 14; Rebs: Milutinov, Ristić 6 Asts: Gudurić, S. Jović 6		Pts: Zhao R. 17; Rebs: Cui, Zhou 5 Asts: Zhao J. 6

Araneta Coliseum, Quezon City
Attendance: 7,292
Referees: Yohan Rosso (FRA), Mārtiņš Kozlovskis (LAT), Rabah Noujaim (LBN)

=== China vs. South Sudan ===
This was the first competitive game between China and South Sudan which ended as a victory for the latter. This is South Sudan's first ever World Cup win.

28 August 2023
16:00

Boxscore

China	69–89	South Sudan
Scoring by quarter: 14–22, 26–22, 13–19, 16–26
Pts: Li 22; Rebs: Li 5 Asts: Zhao J. 4		Pts: Jones 21; Rebs: Maluach 6 Asts: Jones 6

Araneta Coliseum, Quezon City
Attendance: 4,416
Referees: Guilherme Locatelli (BRA), Kerem Baki (TUR), Martin Vulić (CRO)

=== Puerto Rico vs. Serbia ===
This was the second game between Puerto Rico and Serbia in the World Cup. The Serbians won their last meeting in 2019 and also won in the final of the 2016 FIBA Men's Olympic Qualifying Tournament and in the semi-finals of the 2020 edition of the said tournament.

28 August 2023
20:00

Boxscore

Puerto Rico	77–94	Serbia
Scoring by quarter: 15–27, 12–30, 31–18, 19–19
Pts: Piñeiro 14; Rebs: Conditt 11; Asts: Waters 9		Pts: Bogdanović, N. Jović 17; Rebs: Milutinov 15; Asts: S. Jović 6

Araneta Coliseum, Quezon City
Attendance: 2,944
Referees: Yohan Rosso (FRA), Leandro Zalazar (ARG), Carlos Peralta (ECU)

=== South Sudan vs. Serbia ===
This was the first competitive game between South Sudan and Serbia.

30 August 2023
16:00

Boxscore

South Sudan	83–115	Serbia
Scoring by quarter: 20–30, 19–26, 26–27, 18–32
Pts: Jok 21; Rebs: Omot 5 Asts: Jones 6		Pts: N. Jović 25; Rebs: Milutinov 10; Asts: S. Jović 13

Araneta Coliseum, Quezon City
Attendance: 5,848
Referees: Yohan Rosso (FRA), Kerem Baki (TUR), Rabah Noujaim (LBN)

=== China vs. Puerto Rico ===
This was the second game between China and Puerto Rico in the World Cup. The Puerto Ricans won in 2006, which was the last competitive game between the two teams.

30 August 2023
20:00

Boxscore

China	89–107	Puerto Rico
Scoring by quarter: 16–23, 21–29, 32–26, 20–29
Pts: Zhao R. 16; Rebs: Wang, Zhou 5 Asts: Zhao J. 5		Pts: Waters 22; Rebs: Romero 10; Asts: Waters 6

Araneta Coliseum, Quezon City
Attendance: 7,166
Referees: Gatis Saliņš (LAT), Luis Castillo (ESP), Carlos Peralta (ECU)

== Statistical leaders ==
=== Player tournament average ===
Points

#	Player	Pld	Pts	PPG
1	(South Sudan) Carlik Jones	3	59	19.7
2	(Serbia) Bogdan Bogdanović	3	54	18.0
3	(Serbia) Nikola Jović	3	51	17.0
4	(Puerto Rico) Tremont Waters	3	50	16.7
5	(China) Zhao Rui	3	46	15.3

Rebounds

#	Player	Pld	Rebs	RPG
1	(Serbia) Nikola Milutinov	3	31	10.3
2	(Puerto Rico) George Conditt IV	3	29	9.7
3	(Puerto Rico) Ismael Romero	3	24	8.0
4	(Puerto Rico) Stephen Thompson Jr.	3	15	5.0
5	(South Sudan) Marial Shayok	3	14	1.7

Assists

#	Player	Pld	Asts	APG
1	(Puerto Rico) Tremont Waters	3	26	8.7
2	(Serbia) Stefan Jović	3	25	8.3
3	(South Sudan) Carlik Jones	3	23	7.7
4	(Serbia) Bogdan Bogdanović	3	17	5.7
5	(China) Zhao Jiwei	3	15	5.0

Blocks

#	Player	Pld	Blks	BPG
1	(South Sudan) Wenyen Gabriel	3	5	1.7
1	(China) Zhou Qi	3	5	1.7
3	(Puerto Rico) George Conditt IV	3	4	1.3
4	(Serbia) Dejan Davidovac	3	3	1.0
4	(South Sudan) Khaman Maluach	2	2	1.0

Steals

#	Player	Pld	Stls	SPG
1	(Puerto Rico) Tremont Waters	3	8	2.7
2	(Serbia) Bogdan Bogdanović	3	6	2.0
2	(Puerto Rico) Stephen Thompson Jr.	3	6	2.0
2	(Serbia) Aleksa Avramović	2	4	2.0
5	(Serbia) Ognjen Dobrić	3	4	1.4

Minutes

#	Player	Pld	Mins	MPG
1	(Puerto Rico) Tremont Waters	3	105	35.1
2	(Puerto Rico) George Conditt IV	3	90	30.2
3	(South Sudan) Carlik Jones	3	89	29.7
4	(Serbia) Bogdan Bogdanović	3	83	27.9
5	(Puerto Rico) Ismael Romero	3	81	27.2

Free throws

#	Player	FTM	FTA	FT%
1	(Serbia) Bogdan Bogdanović	3	10/11	90.9
2	(Serbia) Aleksa Avramović	2	8/9	88.9
2	(South Sudan) Majok Deng	3	8/9	88.9
4	(China) Zhao Rui	3	10/12	83.3
5	(Puerto Rico) Jordan Howard	3	8/10	80.0

Field goal shooting

#	Player	FGM	FGA	FG%
1	(Serbia) Nikola Jović	18	24	75.0
2	(Puerto Rico) Ismael Romero	18	25	72.0
3	(Serbia) Nikola Milutinov	17	25	68.0
4	(South Sudan) Marial Shayok	14	27	51.9
5	(China) Zhao Rui	15	29	51.7

Efficiency

#	Player	Pld	MPG	PPG	Eff	EffPG
1	(Serbia) Nikola Milutinov	3	25.2	13.3	73.0	24.3
2	(South Sudan) Carlik Jones	3	29.7	19.7	62.0	20.7
2	(Serbia) Nikola Jović	3	25.0	17.0	62.0	20.7
4	(Serbia) Bogdan Bogdanović	3	27.9	18.0	59.0	19.7
5	(Puerto Rico) Ismael Romero	3	27.2	14.0	54.0	18.0
5	(Puerto Rico) Tremont Waters	3	35.1	16.7	54.0	18.0
