= 2023 FIBA Basketball World Cup qualification =

2023 FIBA Basketball World Cup
Qualification

Tournament details
- Dates: 20 February 2020 – 27 February 2023
- Teams: 212 max. (from 212 federations)

Official website
- FIBA.basketball

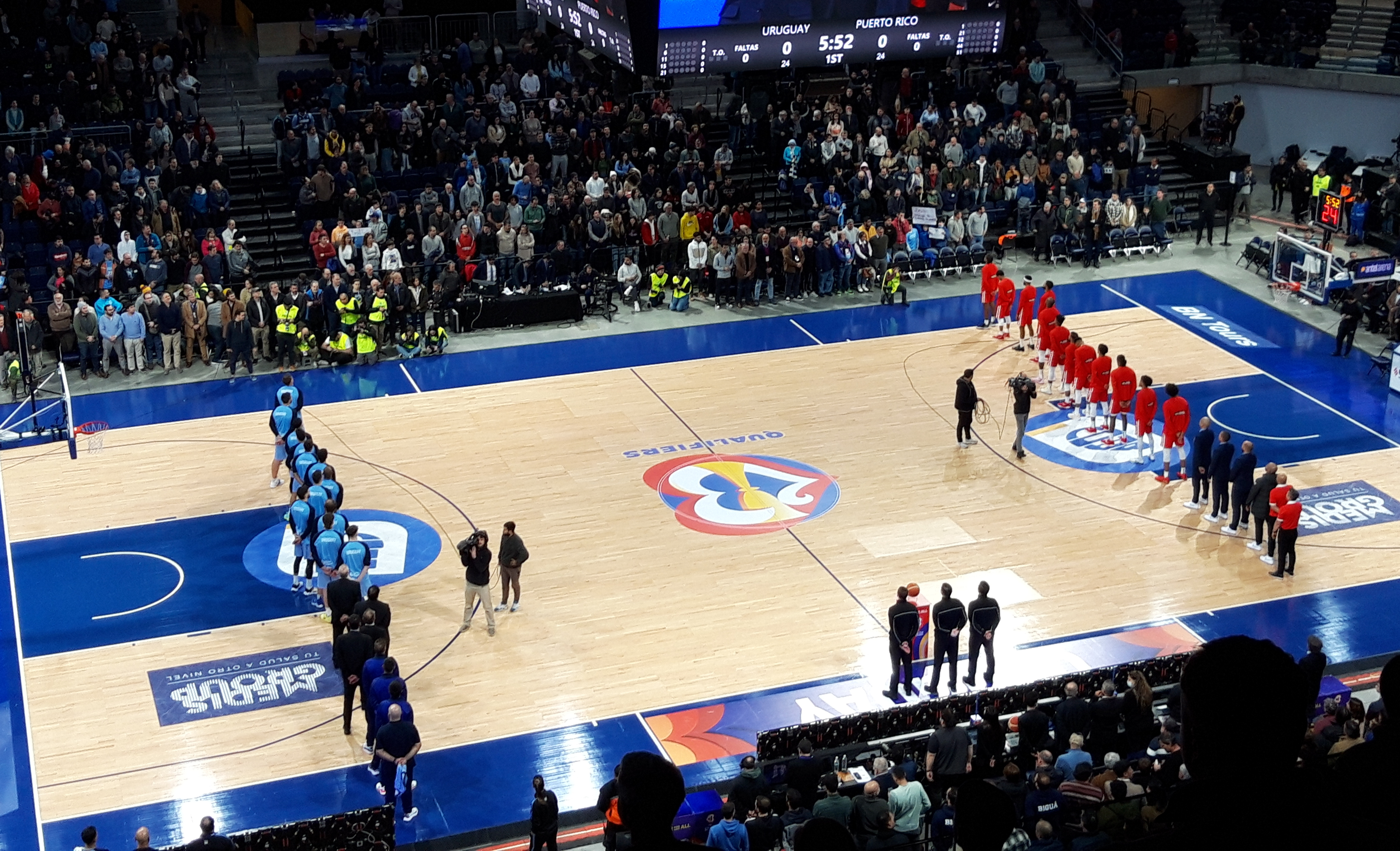
Uruguay vs Puerto Rico match

The 2023 FIBA Basketball World Cup qualification process determined 30 of the 32 teams that qualified for the 2023 FIBA Basketball World Cup. As co-hosts, the Philippines and Japan each got an automatic qualification for the tournament when they were awarded the joint hosting rights along with co-host Indonesia.

== Schedule of windows ==
Similar to the 2019 FIBA Basketball World Cup qualification, the matches were held in six windows over a 15-month period across all FIBA regions. 80 national teams competed during the qualification process. The schedule for the six windows was as follows:

Window	Dates
1	20–30 November 2021
2	21 February – 1 March 2022
3	27 June – 5 July 2022
4	22–30 August 2022
5	10–14 November 2022
6	23–27 February 2023

== Qualified teams ==
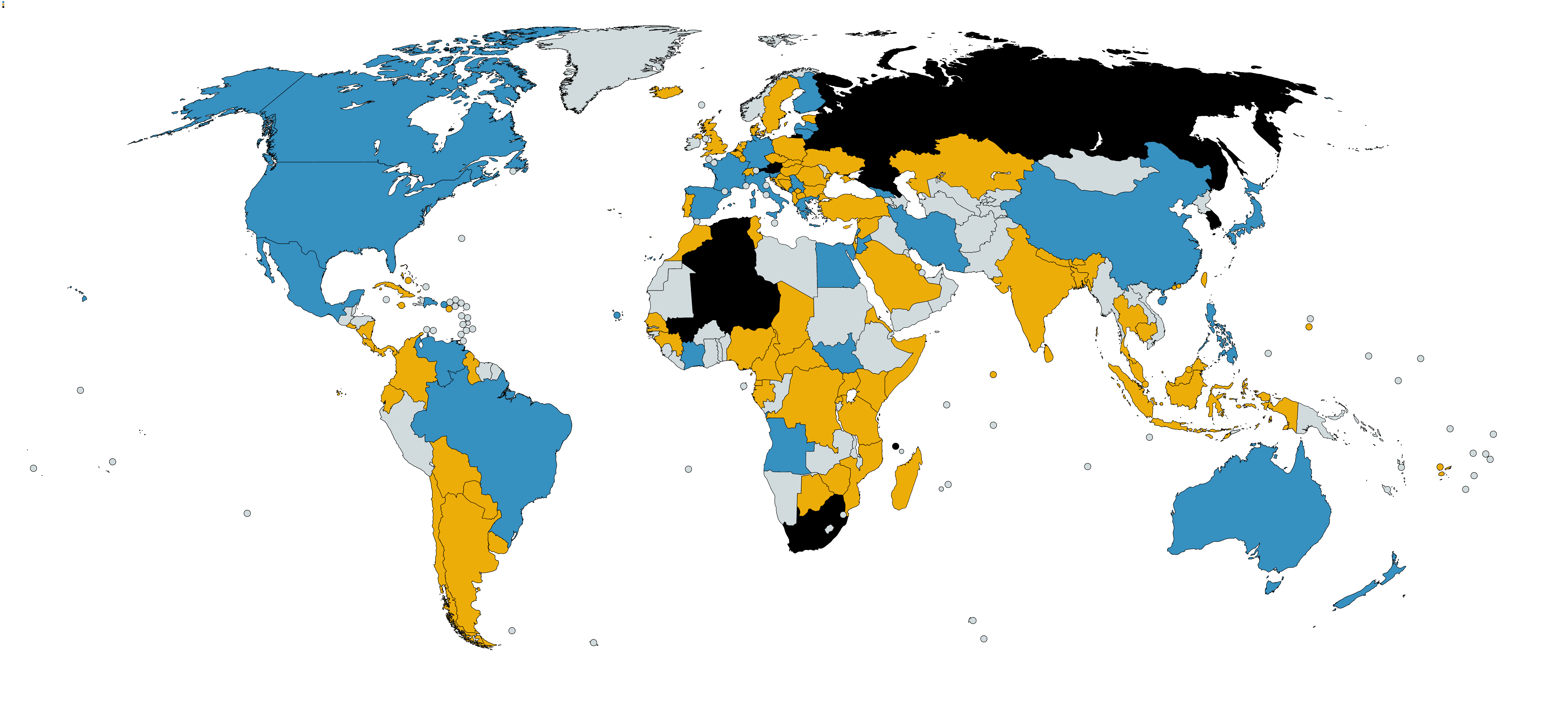
Status of countries with respect to the 2023 FIBA World Cup: Team qualified Team failed to qualify Team withdrew or disqualified Did not enter qualifiers

Co-hosts Indonesia did not gain direct entry to the main event and had to place within the top eight teams in the 2022 FIBA Asia Cup in order to qualify for the tournament as co-hosts. On 18 July 2022, Indonesia lost their spot after failing to reach the quarterfinals of the Asia Cup.

Team	Qualification		Appearance			Best performance	FIBA World Ranking
Team	As	Date	Last	Total	Streak	Best performance	FIBA World Ranking
Japan	Hosts	9 December 2017	2019	6	2	11th place (1967)	38
Philippines	Hosts	9 December 2017	2019	7	3	3rd place (1954)	40
Finland	European Group J top three	28 August 2022	2014	2	1	22nd place (2014)	24
Ivory Coast	African Group E top two	28 August 2022	2019	5	2	13th place (1982)	43
New Zealand	Asian Group E top three	29 August 2022	2019	7	6	4th place (2002)	26
Lebanon	Asian Group E top three	29 August 2022	2010	4	1	16th place (2002)	42
Canada	Americas Group E top three	10 November 2022	2019	15	2	6th place (1978, 1982)	15
Australia	Asian Group F top three	11 November 2022	2019	13	5	4th place (2019)	3
Germany	European Group J top three	11 November 2022	2019	7	2	3rd place (2002)	11
Latvia	European Group I top three	11 November 2022	—N/a	1	1	Debut	29
Italy	European Group L top three	14 November 2022	2019	10	2	4th place (1970, 1978)	10
Spain	European Group L top three	14 November 2022	2019	13	11	Champions (2006, 2019)	1
China	Asian Group F top three	14 November 2022	2019	10	2	8th place (1994)	27
Slovenia	European Group J top three	14 November 2022	2014	4	1	7th place (2014)	7
Lithuania	European Group K top three	14 November 2022	2019	6	5	3rd place (2010)	8
France	European Group K top three	14 November 2022	2019	9	5	3rd place (2014, 2019)	5
Greece	European Group I top three	14 November 2022	2019	9	5	Runners-up (2006)	9
United States	Americas Group F top three	23 February 2023	2019	19	19	Champions (1954, 1986, 1994, 2010, 2014)	2
Jordan	Asian Group E top three	24 February 2023	2019	3	2	23rd place (2010)	34
South Sudan	African Group F top two	24 February 2023	—N/a	1	1	Debut	63
Egypt	African Group F top two	24 February 2023	2014	7	1	5th place (1950)	55
Angola	African Group E top two	25 February 2023	2019	9	6	9th place (2006)	41
Iran	Asian Group F top three	26 February 2023	2019	4	4	19th place (2010)	20
Cape Verde	African best third placed team	26 February 2023	—N/a	1	1	Debut	66
Georgia	European Group L top three	26 February 2023	—N/a	1	1	Debut	32
Montenegro	European Group K top three	26 February 2023	2019	2	2	25th place (2019)	18
Mexico	Americas Group F top three	26 February 2023	2014	6	1	8th place (1967)	31
Puerto Rico	Americas Group F top three	26 February 2023	2019	15	10	4th place (1990)	21
Dominican Republic	Americas Group E top three	26 February 2023	2019	4	3	12th place (1978)	25
Venezuela	Americas Group E top three	26 February 2023	2019	5	2	11th place (1990)	17
Brazil	American best fourth placed team	26 February 2023	2019	19	19	Champions (1959, 1963)	13
Serbia	European Group I top three	27 February 2023	2019	7	7	Champions (1998, 2002)	6

== Format ==
The qualifiers format for the 2023 FIBA Basketball World Cup remained unchanged, with six windows over a 15-month period across the four regions of Africa, Americas, Asia (including Oceania) and Europe. The qualifiers took place from November 2021 to February 2023 with 80 national teams competing for a spot in the World Cup.

The road to the 2023 World Cup began in February 2020 with the start of the European pre-qualifiers, which ended in August 2021.

The draw for the qualifiers were held on 31 August 2021 in Mies, Switzerland.

FIBA zone	Qualifying tournaments		World Cup berths		
FIBA zone	Division A top ranked teams	Division B maximum possible entrants	Allocated berths	Berth as the host nation	Total berths
FIBA Africa	16	2	5	0	5
FIBA Americas	16	2	7	0	7
FIBA Asia; FIBA Oceania	16	17	6	2	8
FIBA Europe	32	13	12	0	12
Total	80	114	30	2	32

== Confederation qualifications ==
=== FIBA Africa ===
==== First round ====
===== Group A =====
Pos	Team	Pld	W	L	PF	PA	PD	Pts	Qualification	CPV	NGR	UGA	MLI
1	Cape Verde	4	3	1	319	296	+23	7	Second round	—	79–71	87–78	Anull.
2	Nigeria	4	2	2	327	299	+28	6	Second round	70–79	—	91–72	Anull.
3	Uganda	4	1	3	296	347	−51	5	Second round	77–74	69–95	—	Anull.
4	Mali (Note: After Mali forfeited two games, they were disqualified and their results nullified.)	0	0	0	0	0	0	0	Disqualified	Canc.	Anull.	Anull.	—

Source: FIBA
Rules for classification: 1) Points; 2) Head-to-head results; 3) Points difference; 4) Points scored.

===== Group B =====
Pos	Team	Pld	W	L	PF	PA	PD	Pts	Qualification	SSD	TUN	CMR	RWA
1	South Sudan	6	6	0	429	368	+61	12	Second round	—	75–61	74–68	68–56
2	Tunisia	6	4	2	386	369	+17	10	Second round	64–72	—	65–54	65–51
3	Cameroon	6	1	5	338	365	−27	7 (Note: Cameroon 109–104 Rwanda)	Second round	55–67	51–55	—	52–59
4	Rwanda	6	1	5	340	391	−51	7		63–73	66–76	45–57	—

Source: FIBA
Rules for classification: 1) Points; 2) Head-to-head results; 3) Points difference; 4) Points scored.

===== Group C =====
Pos	Team	Pld	W	L	PF	PA	PD	Pts	Qualification	CIV	ANG	GUI	CAF
1	Ivory Coast	6	6	0	442	381	+61	12	Second round	—	57–56	80–69	73–63
2	Angola	6	4	2	443	364	+79	10	Second round	73–75	—	75–59	76–60
3	Guinea	6	1	5	381	437	−56	7 (Note: Guinea 132–132 Central African Republic)	Second round	56–65	65–85	—	76–71
4	Central African Republic	6	1	5	367	451	−84	7		64–92	48–78	61–56	—

Source: FIBA
Rules for classification: 1) Points; 2) Head-to-head results; 3) Points difference; 4) Points scored.

===== Group D =====
Pos	Team	Pld	W	L	PF	PA	PD	Pts	Qualification	EGY	COD	SEN	KEN
1	Egypt	6	5	1	452	311	+141	11	Second round	—	62–51	76–43	105–51
2	DR Congo	6	4	2	323	315	+8	10	Second round	52–80	—	62–57	20–0
3	Senegal	6	3	3	421	376	+45	9	Second round	75–57	60–72	—	86–54
4	Kenya (Note: As Kenya forfeited one game, they did not receive a point.)	6	0	6	255	449	−194	5		39–72	56–66	55–100	—

Source: FIBA
Rules for classification: 1) Points; 2) Head-to-head results; 3) Points difference; 4) Points scored.

==== Second round ====
===== Group E =====
Pos	Team	Pld	W	L	PF	PA	PD	Pts	Qualification	CIV	ANG	CPV	NGR	GUI	UGA
1	Ivory Coast	10	8	2	739	664	+75	18 (Note: Ivory Coast 2–0 Angola)	2023 FIBA Basketball World Cup	—	57–56	77–69	78–66	80–69	89–44
2	Angola	10	8	2	735	618	+117	18	2023 FIBA Basketball World Cup	73–75	—	80–67	70–67	75–59	84–62
3	Cape Verde	10	6	4	735	700	+35	16	2023 FIBA Basketball World Cup	79–64	58–65	—	79–71	78–70	87–78
4	Nigeria	10	5	5	742	704	+38	15		72–63	59–65	70–79	—	89–70	91–72
5	Guinea	10	2	8	660	715	−55	12		56–65	65–85	48–65	59–62	—	76–69
6	Uganda	10	1	9	647	857	−210	11		80–91	49–82	77–74	69–95	47–88	—

Source: FIBA
Rules for classification: 1) Points; 2) Head-to-head results; 3) Points difference; 4) Points scored.

===== Group F =====
Pos	Team	Pld	W	L	PF	PA	PD	Pts	Qualification	SSD	EGY	SEN	TUN	COD	CMR
1	South Sudan	12	11	1	943	773	+170	23	2023 FIBA Basketball World Cup	—	97–77	83–75	75–61	101–58	74–68
2	Egypt	12	8	4	881	766	+115	20	2023 FIBA Basketball World Cup	65–85	—	76–43	67–61	62–51	63–71
3	Senegal	12	7	5	870	792	+78	19		69–66	75–57	—	53–70	60–72	90–71
4	Tunisia	12	6	6	772	750	+22	18		64–72	67–71	63–73	—	68–72 (OT)	65–54
5	DR Congo	12	5	7	684	779	−95	17		61–82	52–80	62–57	45–57	—	69–71
6	Cameroon	12	4	8	773	818	−45	16		55–67	74–86	63–89	51–55	85–56	—

Source: FIBA
Rules for classification: 1) Points; 2) Head-to-head results; 3) Points difference; 4) Points scored.

=== FIBA Americas ===
==== First round ====
===== Group A =====
Pos	Team	Pld	W	L	PF	PA	PD	Pts	Qualification	VEN	ARG	PAN	PAR
1	Venezuela	6	5	1	469	343	+126	11 (Note: Venezuela 137–127 Argentina)	Second round	—	66–69	77–56	87–59
2	Argentina	6	5	1	455	382	+73	11	Second round	58–71	—	65–58	83–67
3	Panama	6	2	4	406	414	−8	8	Second round	53–71	77–88	—	81–54
4	Paraguay	6	0	6	330	521	−191	6		48–97	43–82	59–81	—

Source: FIBA
Rules for classification: 1) Points; 2) Head-to-head results; 3) Points difference; 4) Points scored.

===== Group B =====
Pos	Team	Pld	W	L	PF	PA	PD	Pts	Qualification	BRA	URU	COL	CHI
1	Brazil	6	5	1	533	411	+122	11	Second round	—	85–66	119–73	77–53
2	Uruguay	6	4	2	444	434	+10	10	Second round	60–73	—	83–75	75–65
3	Colombia	6	2	4	464	538	−74	8	Second round	104–98(2OT)	69–82	—	67–66
4	Chile	6	1	5	396	454	−58	7		55–81	67–78	90–76	—

Source: FIBA
Rules for classification: 1) Points; 2) Head-to-head results; 3) Points difference; 4) Points scored.

===== Group C =====
Pos	Team	Pld	W	L	PF	PA	PD	Pts	Qualification	CAN	DOM	BAH	ISV
1	Canada	6	6	0	615	417	+198	12	Second round	—	85–79	115–73	94–46
2	Dominican Republic	6	4	2	519	446	+73	10	Second round	75–95	—	88–80	87–65
3	Bahamas	6	2	4	478	560	−82	8	Second round	77–113	65–90	—	86–74
4	Virgin Islands	6	0	6	388	577	−189	6		67–113	56–100	80–97	—

Source: FIBA
Rules for classification: 1) Points; 2) Head-to-head results; 3) Points difference; 4) Points scored.

===== Group D =====
Pos	Team	Pld	W	L	PF	PA	PD	Pts	Qualification	USA	MEX	PUR	CUB
1	United States	6	5	1	535	469	+66	11	Second round	—	89–67	93–76	95–90
2	Mexico	6	4	2	498	498	0	10	Second round	97–88	—	90–86	75–66
3	Puerto Rico	6	3	3	468	475	−7	9	Second round	75–83	97–87 (OT)	—	69–60
4	Cuba	6	0	6	414	473	−59	6		64–87	72–82	62–65	—

Source: FIBA
Rules for classification: 1) Points; 2) Head-to-head results; 3) Points difference; 4) Points scored.

==== Second round ====
===== Group E =====
Pos	Team	Pld	W	L	PF	PA	PD	Pts	Qualification	CAN	DOM	VEN	ARG	PAN	BAH
1	Canada	12	11	1	1172	821	+351	23	2023 FIBA Basketball World Cup	—	85–79	94–56	99–87	112–71	115–73
2	Dominican Republic	12	9	3	985	862	+123	21	2023 FIBA Basketball World Cup	75–95	—	72–68	80–69	70–61	88–80
3	Venezuela	12	8	4	927	806	+121	20 (Note: Venezuela 137–127 Argentina)	2023 FIBA Basketball World Cup	57–74	76–72	—	66–69	77–56	115–70
4	Argentina	12	8	4	944	865	+79	20		83–72	75–79	58–71	—	65–58	95–77
5	Panama	12	3	9	822	944	−122	15 (Note: Panama 167–149 Bahamas)		50–106	67–93	53–71	77–88	—	88–66
6	Bahamas	12	3	9	931	1103	−172	15		77–113	65–90	81–86	76–80	83–79	—

Source: FIBA
Rules for classification: 1) Points; 2) Head-to-head results; 3) Points difference; 4) Points scored.

===== Group F =====
Pos	Team	Pld	W	L	PF	PA	PD	Pts	Qualification	USA	PUR	MEX	BRA	URU	COL
1	United States	12	9	3	1066	952	+114	21	2023 FIBA Basketball World Cup	—	93–76	89–67	79–94	105–71	88–81
2	Puerto Rico	12	8	4	959	942	+17	20 (Note: Puerto Rico 3–1; Mexico 2–2; Brazil 1–3)	2023 FIBA Basketball World Cup	75–83	—	97–87 (OT)	75–72	76–68	91–79
3	Mexico	12	8	4	1000	948	+52	20	2023 FIBA Basketball World Cup	97–88	90–86	—	56–102	80–60	89–93 (OT)
4	Brazil	12	8	4	1046	871	+175	20	2023 FIBA Basketball World Cup	83–76	90–92	72–82	—	85–66	119–73
5	Uruguay	12	5	7	867	935	−68	17		77–88	78–70	69–82	60–73	—	83–75
6	Colombia	12	3	9	928	1101	−173	15		77–95	80–87	54–113	104–98 (2OT)	69–82	—

Source: FIBA
Rules for classification: 1) Points; 2) Head-to-head results; 3) Points difference; 4) Points scored.

=== FIBA Asia and FIBA Oceania ===
==== First round ====
===== Group A =====
Pos	Team	Pld	W	L	PF	PA	PD	Pts	Qualification	NZL	PHI	IND	KOR
1	New Zealand	4	4	0	390	229	+161	8	Second round	—	88–63	101–46	Canc.
2	Philippines (Note: Philippines advanced to the second round as one of the pre-qualified host teams, regardless of the first round results and standings.)	4	2	2	290	321	−31	6	Second round	60–106	—	79–63	Canc.
3	India	4	0	4	233	363	−130	4	Second round	60–95	64–88	—	Canc.
4	South Korea (Note: South Korea forfeited the games against the Philippines and New Zealand due to positive COVID-19 cases among its delegation and was subsequently disqualified.)	0	0	0	0	0	0	0	Disqualified	Canc.	Canc.	Canc.	—

Source: FIBA
Rules for classification: 1) Points; 2) Head-to-head results; 3) Points difference; 4) Points scored.

===== Group B =====
Pos	Team	Pld	W	L	PF	PA	PD	Pts	Qualification	AUS	CHN	JPN	TPE
1	Australia	6	6	0	513	365	+148	12	Second round	—	76–69	80–64	98–61
2	China	6	4	2	493	397	+96	10	Second round	48–71	—	79–63	94–58
3	Japan (Note: Japan advanced to the second round as one of the pre-qualified host teams, regardless of the first round results and standings.)	6	2	4	417	483	−66	8	Second round	52–98	73–106	—	89–49
4	Chinese Taipei	6	0	6	366	544	−178	6		71–90	56–97	71–76	—

Source: FIBA
Rules for classification: 1) Points; 2) Head-to-head results; 3) Points difference; 4) Points scored.

===== Group C =====
Pos	Team	Pld	W	L	PF	PA	PD	Pts	Qualification	LBN	JOR	KSA	IDN
1	Lebanon	6	5	1	529	374	+155	11	Second round	—	89–70	90–60	96–38
2	Jordan	6	4	2	447	401	+46	10	Second round	74–63	—	68–61	94–64
3	Saudi Arabia	6	3	3	425	436	−11	9	Second round	68–81	72–64	—	95–66
4	Indonesia (Note: Indonesia could have secured automatic qualification as co-hosts had they advanced to the quarter-finals of the 2022 FIBA Asia Cup in Jakarta.)	6	0	6	351	541	−190	6		64–110	52–77	67–69	—

Source: FIBA
Rules for classification: 1) Points; 2) Head-to-head results; 3) Points difference; 4) Points scored.

===== Group D =====
Pos	Team	Pld	W	L	PF	PA	PD	Pts	Qualification	KAZ	IRI	BHR	SYR
1	Kazakhstan	6	5	1	452	384	+68	11	Second round	—	68–60	51–62	84–74
2	Iran	6	4	2	482	395	+87	10	Second round	69–73	—	82–66	80–68
3	Bahrain	6	2	4	380	475	−95	8	Second round	48–95	64–100	—	64–80
4	Syria	6	1	5	416	476	−60	7		71–81	56–91	67–76	—

Source: FIBA
Rules for classification: 1) Points; 2) Head-to-head results; 3) Points difference; 4) Points scored.

==== 2022 FIBA Asia Cup – Qualification for Indonesia ====
Indonesia despite being one of the three co-host of the 2023 FIBA Basketball World Cup did not qualify for the main tournament outright. The route available to Indonesia to qualify for their first ever World Cup was to finish in the top eight of the 2022 FIBA Asia Cup tournament. However, the Indonesian team failed at this attempt and finished 11th, after a loss to China in the playoffs in July 2022.

==== Second round ====
===== Group E =====
Pos	Team	Pld	W	L	PF	PA	PD	Pts	Qualification	NZL	LBN	PHI	JOR	KSA	IND
1	New Zealand	10	8	2	926	689	+237	18	2023 FIBA Basketball World Cup	—	106–91	88–63	100–72	110–63	101–46
2	Lebanon	10	7	3	870	768	+102	17	2023 FIBA Basketball World Cup	77–65	—	85–81	89–70	90–60	103–74
3	Philippines	10	6	4	802	768	+34	16 (Note: Philippines 164–157 Jordan)	2023 FIBA Basketball World Cup as hosts	60–106	107–96	—	90–91	84–46	79–63
4	Jordan	10	6	4	775	751	+24	16	2023 FIBA Basketball World Cup	92–75	74–63	66–74	—	68–61	80–64
5	Saudi Arabia	10	3	7	654	767	−113	13		65–80	68–81	63–76	72–64	—	85–54
6	India	10	0	10	611	895	−284	10		60–95	63–95	64–88	63–98	60–71	—

Source: FIBA
Rules for classification: 1) Points; 2) Head-to-head results; 3) Points difference; 4) Points scored.

===== Group F =====
Pos	Team	Pld	W	L	PF	PA	PD	Pts	Qualification	AUS	CHN	JPN	IRI	KAZ	BHR
1	Australia (Note: As Australia forfeited one game, they did not receive a point.)	12	11	1	993	657	+336	22 (Note: Australia 2–0 China)	2023 FIBA Basketball World Cup	—	76–69	80–64	98–68	98–53	83–51
2	China	12	10	2	959	792	+167	22	2023 FIBA Basketball World Cup	48–71	—	79–63	86–74	71–59	80–67
3	Japan	12	7	5	917	878	+39	19	2023 FIBA Basketball World Cup as hosts	52–98	73–106	—	96–61	73–48	95–72
4	Iran	12	6	6	856	824	+32	18	2023 FIBA Basketball World Cup	20–0	72–81	79–68	—	69–73	82–66
5	Kazakhstan	12	5	7	779	872	−93	17		50–97	56–68	61–81	68–60	—	51–62
6	Bahrain	12	2	10	761	1004	−243	14		50–104	67–80 (OT)	74–87	64–100	48–95	—

Source: FIBA
Rules for classification: 1) Points; 2) Head-to-head results; 3) Points difference; 4) Points scored.

=== FIBA Europe ===
==== First round ====
===== Group A =====
Pos	Team	Pld	W	L	PF	PA	PD	Pts	Qualification	LAT	BEL	SRB	SVK
1	Latvia	6	5	1	475	422	+53	11	Second round (Group I)	—	68–63	66–59	82–74
2	Belgium	6	4	2	460	392	+68	10	Second round (Group I)	65–66	—	73–69	102–59
3	Serbia	6	3	3	448	439	+9	9	Second round (Group I)	101–100	73–74	—	75–63
4	Slovakia	6	0	6	376	506	−130	6		60–93	57–83	63–71	—

Source: FIBA
Rules for classification: 1) Points; 2) Head-to-head results; 3) Points difference; 4) Points scored.

===== Group B =====
Pos	Team	Pld	W	L	PF	PA	PD	Pts	Qualification	GRE	TUR	GBR	BLR
1	Greece	4	3	1	310	287	+23	7	Second round (Group I)	—	72–71	93–71	Annu.
2	Turkey	4	2	2	307	286	+21	6	Second round (Group I)	67–76	—	84–67	Canc.
3	Great Britain	4	1	3	287	331	−44	5	Second round (Group I)	78–69	71–85	—	Canc.
4	Belarus (Note: Belarus was expelled, after beating Turkey 84–70 and losing against Greece 77–67.)	0	0	0	0	0	0	0	Expelled	Canc.	Annu.	Canc.	—

Source: FIBA
Rules for classification: 1) Points; 2) Head-to-head results; 3) Points difference; 4) Points scored.

===== Group C =====
Pos	Team	Pld	W	L	PF	PA	PD	Pts	Qualification	FIN	SLO	SWE	CRO
1	Finland	6	5	1	474	446	+28	11	Second round (Group J)	—	86–76	85–69	77–71
2	Slovenia	6	4	2	506	482	+24	10	Second round (Group J)	79–83	—	94–89	97–69
3	Sweden	6	2	4	479	494	−15	8	Second round (Group J)	72–62	81–84	—	98–105 (OT)
4	Croatia	6	1	5	462	499	−37	7		79–81	74–76	64–70	—

Source: FIBA
Rules for classification: 1) Points; 2) Head-to-head results; 3) Points difference; 4) Points scored.

===== Group D =====
Pos	Team	Pld	W	L	PF	PA	PD	Pts	Qualification	GER	ISR	EST	POL
1	Germany	6	5	1	474	425	+49	11	Second round (Group J)	—	84–80	66–69	93–83
2	Israel	6	3	3	476	452	+24	9	Second round (Group J)	67–71	—	96–77	69–61
3	Estonia	6	2	4	415	470	−55	8 (Note: Estonia 143–141 Poland)	Second round (Group J)	57–88	69–79	—	75–71
4	Poland	6	2	4	444	462	−18	8		69–72	90–85 (OT)	70–68	—

Source: FIBA
Rules for classification: 1) Points; 2) Head-to-head results; 3) Points difference; 4) Points scored.

===== Group E =====
Pos	Team	Pld	W	L	PF	PA	PD	Pts	Qualification	FRA	MNE	HUN	POR
1	France	6	5	1	464	343	+121	11	Second round (Group K)	—	73–67	81–40	94–56
2	Montenegro	6	4	2	464	428	+36	10	Second round (Group K)	70–69	—	84–88	83–69
3	Hungary	6	3	3	399	469	−70	9	Second round (Group K)	54–78	67–83	—	69–68
4	Portugal	6	0	6	386	473	−87	6		56–69	62–77	75–81	—

Source: FIBA
Rules for classification: 1) Points; 2) Head-to-head results; 3) Points difference; 4) Points scored.

===== Group F =====
Pos	Team	Pld	W	L	PF	PA	PD	Pts	Qualification	LTU	CZE	BIH	BUL
1	Lithuania	6	5	1	462	421	+41	11	Second round (Group K)	—	72–83	77–56	89–69
2	Czech Republic	6	3	3	485	483	+2	9 (Note: Czech Republic 183–178 Bosnia and Herzegovina)	Second round (Group K)	66–74	—	93–81	83–80
3	Bosnia and Herzegovina	6	3	3	472	486	−14	9	Second round (Group K)	77–78	97–90	—	76–73
4	Bulgaria	6	1	5	446	475	−29	7		70–72	79–70	75–85	—

Source: FIBA
Rules for classification: 1) Points; 2) Head-to-head results; 3) Points difference; 4) Points scored.

===== Group G =====
Pos	Team	Pld	W	L	PF	PA	PD	Pts	Qualification	ESP	GEO	UKR	MKD
1	Spain	6	5	1	504	402	+102	11	Second round (Group L)	—	89–61	88–74	80–44
2	Georgia	6	4	2	467	462	+5	10	Second round (Group L)	82–76 (OT)	—	88–83	91–70
3	Ukraine	6	3	3	463	448	+15	9	Second round (Group L)	76–77	79–66	—	78–61
4	North Macedonia	6	0	6	373	495	−122	6		65–94	65–79	68–73	—

Source: FIBA
Rules for classification: 1) Points; 2) Head-to-head results; 3) Points difference; 4) Points scored.

===== Group H =====
Pos	Team	Pld	W	L	PF	PA	PD	Pts	Qualification	ITA	ISL	NED	RUS
1	Italy	4	3	1	367	348	+19	7 (Note: Italy 200–194 Iceland)	Second round (Group L)	—	95–87	75–73	Canc.
2	Iceland	4	3	1	340	343	−3	7	Second round (Group L)	107–105	—	67–66	Canc.
3	Netherlands	4	0	4	297	313	−16	4	Second round (Group L)	81–92	77–79	—	Canc.
4	Russia (Note: Russia was expelled, after beating Italy 92–78, Iceland 89–65 and Netherlands 80–69.)	0	0	0	0	0	0	0	Expelled	Annu.	Annu.	Annu.	—

Source: FIBA
Rules for classification: 1) Points; 2) Head-to-head results; 3) Points difference; 4) Points scored.

==== Second round ====
===== Group I =====
Pos	Team	Pld	W	L	PF	PA	PD	Pts	Qualification	LAT	SRB	GRE	TUR	BEL	GBR
1	Latvia	10	9	1	807	707	+100	19	2023 FIBA Basketball World Cup	—	66–59	67–57	111–85	68–63	79–63
2	Serbia	10	6	4	825	803	+22	16 (Note: Serbia 192–191 Greece)	2023 FIBA Basketball World Cup	101–100	—	100–94 (OT)	77–76	73–74	101–83
3	Greece	10	6	4	775	764	+11	16	2023 FIBA Basketball World Cup	60–80	97–92 (OT)	—	72–71	85–68	93–71
4	Turkey	10	4	6	782	742	+40	14 (Note: Turkey 2–0 Belgium)		74–83	72–79	67–76	—	86–52	84–67
5	Belgium	10	4	6	679	717	−38	14		65–66	73–69	70–72	54–82	—	72–57
6	Great Britain	10	1	9	697	832	−135	11		80–87	68–74	78–69	71–85	59–88	—

Source: FIBA
Rules for classification: 1) Points; 2) Head-to-head results; 3) Points difference; 4) Points scored.

===== Group J =====
Pos	Team	Pld	W	L	PF	PA	PD	Pts	Qualification	GER	FIN	SLO	SWE	ISR	EST
1	Germany	12	10	2	960	854	+106	22	2023 FIBA Basketball World Cup	—	94–80	90–71	73–66	84–80	66–69
2	Finland	12	9	3	978	934	+44	21	2023 FIBA Basketball World Cup	81–87	—	86–76	85–69	79–73	91–71
3	Slovenia	12	7	5	994	958	+36	19	2023 FIBA Basketball World Cup	81–75	79–83	—	94–89	79–87	104–83
4	Sweden	12	5	7	919	939	−20	17		50–67	72–62	81–84	—	71–68	71–72
5	Israel	12	4	8	944	948	−4	16 (Note: Israel 2–0 Estonia)		67–71	95–97 (OT)	62–75	83–95	—	96–77
6	Estonia	12	4	8	870	977	−107	16		57–88	68–76	79–78	82–87	69–79	—

Source: FIBA
Rules for classification: 1) Points; 2) Head-to-head results; 3) Points difference; 4) Points scored.

===== Group K =====
Pos	Team	Pld	W	L	PF	PA	PD	Pts	Qualification	FRA	LTU	MNE	HUN	BIH	CZE
1	France	12	10	2	973	742	+231	22	2023 FIBA Basketball World Cup	—	70–63	73–67	81–40	92–56	95–60
2	Lithuania	12	9	3	922	852	+70	21	2023 FIBA Basketball World Cup	65–90	—	90–73	89–64	77–56	72–83
3	Montenegro	12	7	5	900	852	+48	19	2023 FIBA Basketball World Cup	70–69	56–65	—	84–88	88–69	88–70
4	Hungary	12	6	6	871	954	−83	18 (Note: Hungary 165–160 Bosnia and Herzegovina)		54–78	78–88	67–83	—	87–77	83–69
5	Bosnia and Herzegovina	12	6	6	927	987	−60	18		96–90 (2OT)	77–78	74–66	83–78	—	97–90
6	Czech Republic	12	3	9	878	968	−90	15		59–72	66–74	56–65	79–82	93–81	—

Source: FIBA
Rules for classification: 1) Points; 2) Head-to-head results; 3) Points difference; 4) Points scored.

===== Group L =====
Pos	Team	Pld	W	L	PF	PA	PD	Pts	Qualification	ESP	ITA	GEO	ISL	UKR	NED
1	Spain	10	8	2	823	703	+120	18 (Note: Spain 156–156 Italy. Teams ranked on overall points difference.)	2023 FIBA Basketball World Cup	—	68–72	89–61	87–57	88–74	84–72
2	Italy	10	8	2	881	836	+45	18	2023 FIBA Basketball World Cup	84–88 (OT)	—	91–84	95–87	85–75	75–73
3	Georgia	10	5	5	795	814	−19	15 (Note: Georgia 165–165 Iceland. Teams ranked on overall points difference.)	2023 FIBA Basketball World Cup	82–76 (OT)	84–85	—	77–80	88–83	77–66
4	Iceland	10	5	5	786	842	−56	15		61–80	107–105 (2OT)	85–88	—	91–88 (OT)	67–66
5	Ukraine	10	4	6	811	797	+14	14		76–77	89–97	79–66	79–72	—	72–56
6	Netherlands	10	0	10	712	816	−104	10		64–86	81–92	80–88	77–79	77–96	—

Source: FIBA
Rules for classification: 1) Points; 2) Head-to-head results; 3) Points difference; 4) Points scored.

== Statistical leaders ==
As of 27 February 2023

=== Player averages ===
Category	Player	Team	Average
Points	Amir Hinton	Syria	26.7
Rebounds	Walter Tavares	Cape Verde	11.7
Assists	Facundo Campazzo	Argentina	7.5
Steals	Childe Dundão	Angola	3.3
Blocks	Kendall Gray	Rwanda	3.2
Efficiency	Amir Hinton	Syria	24.5

=== Team averages ===
Category	Team	Average
Points	Canada	97.7
Rebounds	Senegal	46.2
Assists	Australia	25.8
Steals	Angola	15.1
Blocks	France	4.3
Efficiency	Canada	120.3
