= Sahaij Sekhon =

Indian basketball player

Personal information
- Born: 1 September 2001 (age 25)
- Listed height: 1.94 m (6 ft 4 in)

Career information
- High school: Vivek High School, SD School
- College: GGDSD College
- Position: Point guard

Career history
- 2021–2022: Chandigarh
- 2022–2025: Indian Railways
- 2025–Present: Omni Erdenet Miners

Career highlights
- 1× National Basketball Championship MVP (2020)

Sahaij Pratap Singh Sekhon (born 1 September 2001), is an Indian professional basketball player.

== Early life ==
As a kid, Sahaij Sekhon started out playing cricket, wanting to be a batsman. In second grade, he shifted to soccer. It was while playing soccer that his first coach Rakesh Kumar scouted him along with Asadh Singh, another national-level player. Kumar recalled that Sekhon played with quickness and guile like none other he had seen before. Despite his relatively short stature back then, coach Rakesh recommended that he take up basketball because he felt that it would suit Sahaij Sekhon's skill set better. Sekhon effectively destroyed all other teams in the school's inter-house tournament, often not letting the other team score a single point.

== Playing career ==
At Vivek High School in Chandigarh, Sahaij Sekhon played with the U-19 team in 2017 while being one of the youngest and shortest players. Coach Rakesh stayed with Sekhon as his mentor. During 11th grade, Sahaij Sekhon transferred to SD School. Around the same time, he had a massive growth spurt, where he grew 8 inches within a short period of time to reach 6 feet 4 inches.

Sahaij Sekhon played for his home city Chandigarh in both U-16 and U-17 competitions. In 2020, he won the Most Valuable Player award in the Senior Nationals.

Sekhon has also played for GGDSD College where he has studied for his Bachelor's degree.

=== National team ===
Because of Sekhon's dominant High School performances, coach Rakesh recommended to his family that they take him to coach Amarjeet Singh who had worked with India's senior national team in the past. Amarjeet Singh noticed that Sekhon's skillsets were leaning more towards a defensive-minded Point guard.

During India's Senior National Basketball Championship, Sekhon was playing with his Chandigarh team against Uttar Pradesh. India's national team coach Veselin Matić approached Sekhon's team manager and subsequently invited Sekhon to the National team training camp in January 2020.

At the 2021 FIBA Asia Cup qualification do-or-die game against Palestine, Sekhon acted as a game-changer as through his defense he locked down Palestine' top scorer Kyndall Dykes.

== Player profile ==
Sekhon is known especially for his quickness and defensive abilities.
