= Richard Rodger =

English-born Scottish cricketer

Personal information
- Full name: Richard Gordon Rodger
- Born: 1 October 1947 (age 79); Norwich, Norfolk, England
- Height: 6 ft 5 in (1.96 m)
- Batting: Right-handed
- Bowling: Slow left-arm orthodox

Domestic team information
- Years: Team
- 1972–1982: Cheshire

Career statistics
Competition	First-class	List A
Matches	1	1
Runs scored	2	16
Batting average	1.00	16.00
100s/50s	0/0	0/0
Top score	2	16
Balls bowled	90	42
Wickets	0	0
Bowling average	–	–
5 wickets in innings	0	0
10 wickets in match	0	–
Best bowling	–	–
Catches/stumpings	0/–	0/–
- Source: Cricinfo, 7 April 2011

Richard Gordon Rodger (born 1 October 1947) is an English born former Scottish cricketer. Rodger was a right-handed batsman who bowled slow left-arm orthodox. He was born in Norwich, Norfolk.

Rodger made his debut for Cheshire in the 1972 Minor Counties Championship against the Somerset Second XI. He played Minor counties cricket for Cheshire from 1972 to 1982, including 56 Minor Counties Championship matches. In 1982, he made his only List A appearance for Cheshire against Middlesex in the NatWest Trophy. In this match he scored 16 runs before being dismissed by Simon Hughes.

Rodger also represented Scotland in a single first-class match against Ireland in 1975. In Scotland's first-innings he scored 2 runs before being dismissed by Roy Torrens and in their second-innings he was dismissed by Dermott Monteith for a duck. With the ball he bowled 15 wicket-less overs. He played Second XI cricket for the Warwickshire Second XI in 1973.
