= Prashant Singh Rawat =

Indian basketball player (born 2000)

Personal information
- Born: 15 August 2000 (age 26)
- Listed height: 2.02 m (6 ft 8 in)

Career information
- High school: Aryaman Vikram Birla Public School
- College: Motiram Baburam Government Post Graduate College, Haldwani, Uttarakhand
- NBA draft: 2022: undrafted
- Playing career: 2017–present
- Position: Forward

Career history
- 2017–2022: Uttarakhand

Career highlights
- 2017 National Basketball Championship – Champion

Prashant Singh Rawat (born 15 August 2000) is an Indian professional basketball player, last playing for Uttarakhand of the National Basketball Championship.

== Personal ==
Prashant Singh Rawat is the son of Narendra Singh Rawat, a former India national team player who represented his home country from 1993 to 2000 at several international events in Indonesia, Singapore, Malaysia and China. After this, Narendra Singh Rawat was appointed as a physical teacher in a private school in Rudrapur, Uttarakhand. During this time he continued to practice basketball with Prashant. In later years Prashant went on to Motiram Baburam Government Post Graduate College where he was part of the basketball team.

== Playing career ==
Rawat was selected for the NBA Academy in 2017 as one of the top 22 children in the country.

He represented his home country at the 2018 FIBA Under-18 Asian Championship in Thailand. Also a Gold Medalist in the South Asian Basketball Championship 2018 in Bangladesh.

Since 2020, he has been a member of the Indian senior team for the 2021 FIBA Asia Cup qualification and 2023 FIBA Basketball World Cup Asian Qualification.

Altogether, he represented India in China, Australia, Bangladesh, Thailand Bahrain, Saudi Arabia, Indonesia.

He represented the nation in 2022 FIBA Asia Cup in Jakarta, Indonesia . He has represented India in 2022 FIBA 3x3 Asia Cup in Singapore.
