= Goswami Ganesh Dutta Sanatan Dharma College =

College of Panjab University

- Motto: Sanskrit: धर्मे ते धीयतां बुद्धिर्मनस्ते महदस्तु च
- Motto in English: Firm in Faith and Broad in Mind
- Type: University college
- Established: 1973; 53 years ago
- Affiliations: Panjab University
- Principal: Dr. Ajay Sharma
- Location: 32-C, Chandigarh, India; 30.704503°N 76.772216°E
- Campus: Urban
- Website: ggdsd.ac.in
- Location within Chandigarh Location within India

Goswami Ganesh Dutta Sanatan Dharma College (GGDSDC) is a college of Panjab University located in the North Indian city of Chandigarh. Established in 1973, the GGDSD college is spread over 16.5 acres of land. The college has been awarded A+ grade by the National Assessment and Accreditation Council (NAAC), Bangalore. The college is ranked 70th among colleges in India by the National Institutional Ranking Framework (NIRF), MHRD in 2024. The college is also recognized as 'College with Potential for Excellence' by the University Grants Commission (UGC), Delhi.
