= Muin Bek Hafeez =

Indian basketball player (born 1996)

Personal information
- Born: 16 March 1996 (age 30) Krishnagiri, Tamil Nadu, India
- Listed height: 1.90 m (6 ft 3 in)

Career information
- High school: SAI Academy
- College: Jeppiaar Institute of Technology
- NBA draft: 2020: undrafted
- Position: Point Guard/Forward

Career history
- 2018: ONGC BC
- 2019–2022: Indian Bank Chennai BC
- 2023–: Tamil Nadu
Medals
Men's basketball
Representing India
South Asian Games
Gold medal – first place	2019 Kathmandu	Team

Muin Bek Hafeez (born 16 March 1996) is an Indian professional basketball player, most recently for Indian Bank Chennai BC.

== High school ==
Hailing from Krishnagiri, Muin Hafeez has practiced many different sports disciplines. As a kid he played cricket, Kho kho and martial arts. While at school at the SAI Academy in Salem, Hafeez also competed in Judo at the divisional and Throwball at the state-level. Soon, Muin Hafeez discovered his talent for basketball and went on to favor it above all other sports. He normally played the center position.

== College ==
When Muin Hafeez went to college at Jeppiaar Institute of Technology, he competed against physically bigger opponents. This made him switch positions so he moved outside to play forward. He eventually found success representing his university, with whom he won the IMG-Reliance College League National Finals. He was also selected for Tamil Nadu's U18 squad for the Junior Nationals in Kerala, and his performances earned him an invite to India's national camps in 2014. In 2017, when he was still in college, he played in the nationals finals once again.

== Later playing career ==
He played for ONGC BC in the 2018 Federation Cup. In 2019, he joined the Indian Bank Chennai BC, which dominated through half a dozen invitational tournaments that year. In 2020, he finished as top scorer for Indian Bank at the National Championship.

== India national team ==
In 2017, as a late bloomer, Hafeez received an invitation for India’s national team. He made his India debut at age 21 for the 2017 SABA Championship in Maldives. He achieved a rare feat, playing for the senior squad without prior experience with either the U18 or U16 squad. Hafeez played for the team in three continuous tournaments that year-the BRICS Games in China, the William Jones Cup in Chinese Taipei, and the 2017 FIBA Asia Cup in Lebanon. In July 2019, Hafeez was finally called back up to the national team. India’s new head coach Veselin Matic gave him the role as point guard, a position that India has often struggled with in the past. Hafeez later stressed the major adjustments he had to make to switch positions in such a drastic way. At the 2021 FIBA Asia Cup qualification, at the first game against Bahrain, Hafeez ended up with 13 points and 8 rebounds, and led the team in efficiency rating (13). Because of his good performance, Hafeez was part of the Starting lineup against Iraq three days later. By the final buzzer, Hafeez had ended with a team-high 24 points, a game-high 8 assists, plus 8 rebounds and 3 steals, all while finishing with the highest efficiency in the game (32). India cruised to a 94-75 win. India was able to end its losing streak.

== Personal ==
He holds a degree in mechanical engineering.
