= Hayk Gyokchyan =

Lebanese basketball player

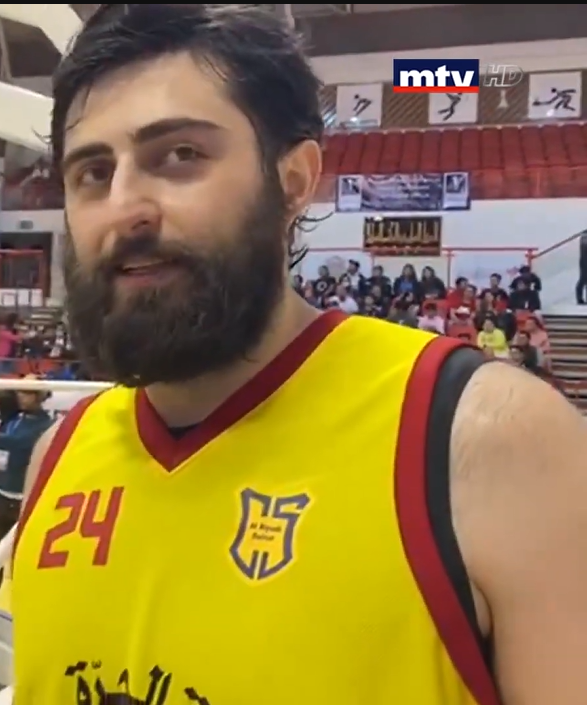

No. 24 – Al Riyadi
- Position: Power forward
- League: Lebanese Basketball League

Personal information
- Born: December 11, 1989 (age 36) Yerevan, Armenia
- Listed height: 2.03 m (6 ft 8 in)
- Listed weight: 97 kg (214 lb)

Career information
- High school: Conwell–Egan Catholic (Fairless Hills, Pennsylvania)
- College: Franklin & Marshall (2009–2013)
- NBA draft: 2013: undrafted
- Playing career: 2013–present

Career history
- 2013–2014: Homenetmen Beirut
- 2014–2016: Sagesse SC
- 2016–2018: Homenetmen Beirut
- 2018–2021: Al Riyadi
- 2021–2022: Beirut Club
- 2022–present: Al Riyadi

Hayk Gyokchyan (born December 11, 1989, in Yerevan) is a Lebanese professional basketball player for Al Riyadi of the Lebanese Basketball League. In the 2013–14 season he played briefly for Homenetmen Beirut, before joining Sagesse SC. In 2016, he returned to Homenetmen, and then joined Al Riyadi.

== Personal Information ==
Nationality: Lebanese, Armenian

Listed Height: 203 cm (6 ft 8 in)

== Early life and education ==
Gyokchyan was born in Yerevan, Armenia on December 11, 1989. He moved to Lebanon at the age of 2. He was granted Lebanese citizenship at the age of 16 in 2006 by the Lebanese Government with the help of the Lebanese Basketball Federation.

In 2006 after the Lebanese Israeli war, he moved to USA where he attended Conwell–Egan Catholic High School in Pennsylvania for his junior and senior seasons. After graduating, Gyokchyan decided to do a postgraduate year at The Lawrenceville School in New Jersey. He attended Franklin & Marshall College as a student athlete. He graduated from F&M in 2013 with a BA. He then returned to Lebanon to play professional basketball and has been doing so since 2013.

== Basketball career ==
Junior Career

Gyokchyan represented the junior national team from 2006 till 2008.

College Career

Gyokchyan was a player at Franklin & Marshall College.

Professional Career

In 2013, Gyokchyan returned to Lebanon to play professionally. He started with Homenetmen Beirut his rookie season. He earned a 2-year deal with Sagesse at the conclusion of the season. He then inked a 2-year deal with Homenetmen Beirut. He then moved to Al Riyadi in 2018. Gyokchyan signed for Beirut Club for the 2021–2022 season. He then went back to Al Riyadi.

National Team

Because Gyokchyan obtained Lebanese citizenship after the age of 16, Hayk was not able to represent the senior national team in official FIBA competitions. However, FIBA granted him eligibility to play for the national team in November 2021.

== Career Info ==
College: Franklin & Marshall College (Lancaster, Pennsylvania, US 2009-2013)

NBA Draft: 2013 Undrafted

Playing Career: 2013–present

== Medals ==
3rd place FIBA U18 Asian Championship 2006 Ürümqi, China with Lebanon U18 NT

1st place U18 Arab Championship 2006 Homs, Syria with Lebanon U18 NT

1st place Centennial Conference 2010 2011 & 2012 in USA with Franklin & Marshall College

1st place Arab Club Championship Rabat, Morocco 2017 with Homenetmen

1st place 2018 LBL with Homenetmen Beirut

1st place 2019 Dubai Tournament with Al Riyadi

1st place 2019 LBL with Al Riyadi

1st place 2021 Eurasian Championship in Yerevan, Armenia with Al Riyadi

1st place 2021 LBL with Al Riyadi

1st place 2022 LBL with Beirut Club

1st place 2022 Arab NT Championship in Dubai, UAE with Lebanon NT

2nd place 2022 FIBA ASIA Cup in Jakarta, Indonesia with Lebanon NT
