= Zhao Rui (basketball) =

Chinese basketball player

No. 10 – Beijing Ducks
- Position: Combo guard
- League: CBA

Personal information
- Born: 14 January 1996 (age 30) Daqing, Heilongjiang, China
- Listed height: 1.95 m (6 ft 5 in)
- Listed weight: 93 kg (205 lb)

Career information
- Playing career: 2016–present

Career history
- 2016–2023: Guangdong Southern Tigers
- 2023–2025: Xinjiang Flying Tigers
- 2025–present: Beijing Ducks
Medals
Men's basketball
Representing China
Asian Games
Gold medal – first place	2018 Jakarta
Bronze medal – third place	2022 Hangzhou
FIBA Asia Cup
Silver medal – second place	2025 Saudi Arabia
FIBA Asia Under-18 Championship
Gold medal – first place	2014 Doha

Zhao Rui (Chinese: 赵睿, born January 14, 1996) is a Chinese professional basketball player for the Chinese national team and the Beijing Ducks. He was included in the Chinese squad for the 2019 FIBA Basketball World Cup.

Later, Zhao was included in China's squad for the 2023 FIBA Basketball World Cup qualification.

In August 2025, Zhao joined another CBA team Beijing Ducks.
