= Arvind Muthu Krishnan =

Indian basketball player

Arvind Muthu Krishnan (born 16 March 2000) is an Indian basketball player from Tamil Nadu. He plays for the India men's national basketball team as a point guard. He plays for Tamil Nadu in the domestic tournaments.

== Career ==
Muthu Krishnan started as a youth player in 2018 when he represented Indian youth team in the FIBA U18 Asian Championship. In 2021, he played for Senior India team in the FIBA Asia Cup 2021 Qualifiers and in 2022, he played three matches in the FIBA Asia Cup. In 2023, he represented India and played 10 matches in the FIBA Basketball World Cup 2023 Asian Qualifiers. In 2023, he also played the FIBA Olympic Pre-Qualifying Tournament at Syria.

In August 2025, he played 8 matches in the FIBA Asia Cup 2025 Qualifiers and was the top scorer in the first match which they lost against higher ranked Jordan. Later in the year, he was also part of the India team that played the FiBA Asia Cup. He also represented India in two matches at the FIBA Basketball World Cup 2027 Asian Qualifiers.

In March 2025, he also led India in the 3x3 men's basketball Asia Cup at Singapore. Along with Harsh Dagar and Pranav Prince, he helped India enter the quarterfinals.
