= Amir Hinton =

American-Syrian basketball player (born 1997)

No. 3 – Kazma SC
- Position: Point guard

Personal information
- Born: February 14, 1997 (age 29) Philadelphia, Pennsylvania
- Listed height: 6 ft 5 in (1.96 m)
- Listed weight: 190 lb (86 kg)

Career information
- High school: Abington (Abington, Pennsylvania)
- College: Lock Haven (2016–2018); Shaw (2018–2019)
- NBA draft: 2019: undrafted
- Playing career: 2019–present

Career history
- 2019–2020: Westchester Knicks
- 2021–2022: Kouvot
- 2022–2023: KK Sutjeska Nikšić
- 2023–2024: Medipolis SC Jena
- 2024–2025: Gladiators Trier
- 2025–2026: Artland Dragons
- 2026–present: Kazma SC

Career highlights
- First-team Division II All-American – NABC (2019); NCAA Division II Scoring Leader (2019); CIAA Player of the Year (2019); First-team All-CIAA (2019); First-team All-PSAC East (2017, 2018); PSAC East Freshman of the Year (2017)
- Stats at Basketball Reference
Medals
Men's basketball
Representing the Syria

Amir Jabbar Hinton (born February 14, 1997) is an American-born naturalized Syrian professional basketball player for Kazma SC in the Kuwait Kuwaiti Division I. He also plays for the Syria men's national basketball team. Hinton played college basketball for Shaw University and Lock Haven University.

== Early life and High school ==
Hinton was born and raised in Philadelphia, Pennsylvania and attended Abington Senior High School in the suburb of Abington. He did not play basketball as a freshman and played sparingly on the Galloping Ghosts' junior varsity team as a sophomore before starting his final two years. He scored over 1,000 career points at Abington, despite only playing two seasons, and averaged 19.5 points per game and was a second team AAAA All-State selection as a senior.

== College career ==
=== Lock Haven ===
Hinton began his collegiate career at Lock Haven, playing two seasons for the Bald Eagles after redshirting as a freshman due to academics. He averaged 23 points per game both seasons and led the Pennsylvania State Athletic Conference (PSAC) with 2.4 steals per game as a redshirt sophomore, earning first team All-PSAC East honors and was named the PSAC East Freshman of the Year during his redshirt freshman season. Despite his success, Hinton opted to transfer after his redshirt sophomore season. He was the fastest player in PSAC history to reach 1,000 career points and finished his career at Lock Haven with 1,227.

=== Shaw ===
Hinton ultimately transferred to Shaw University, in large part due to former NBA player and Shaw standout, Flip Murray's Philadelphia connections. In his first season with the Bears, he averaged an NCAA Division II-leading 29.4 points per game and was named the Central Intercollegiate Athletic Association (CIAA) Player of the Year. Considered to be a rare Division II NBA prospect, Hinton announced on March 7, 2019, that he would be forgoing his final year of eligibility to enter the 2019 NBA draft. In his only season with Shaw Hinton scored 853 points and finished his collegiate career with 2,080 points in 81 games played (25.7 points per game).

== Professional career ==
Hinton went unselected in the 2019 NBA Draft and reportedly signed an Exhibit 10 contract with the New York Knicks as an undrafted free agent later that night. Hinton officially signed with the Knicks on September 17, 2019, but was waived on October 16. Following his release, he joined the Knicks' NBA G League affiliate, the Westchester Knicks, as an affiliate player. On November 11 against the Lakeland Magic, Hinton posted 24 points, five rebounds, and two steals. He finished the season averaging 7.9 points, 1.9 rebounds, and 1.0 steal per game.

On August 30, 2021, Hinton signed with Kouvot of the Finnish Korisliiga.

On September 13, 2023, Hinton signed with Medipolis SC Jena in the German ProA, after playing for montenegrinan Club KK Sutjeska in 2022.

On July 21, 2025, he signed with Artland Dragons in the German ProA.

== National team career ==
Hinton joined the Syria men's national basketball team in 2021 as a naturalised player for the 2023 FIBA Basketball World Cup qualification. On February 24, 2022, he recorded 36 points, 7 rebounds and 5 assists in an 80–64 win over Bahrain.
