= Pratyanshu Tomar =

Indian basketball player

Pratyanshu Tomar (born 17 June 2000) is an Indian basketball player from Karnataka. He plays for the India men's national basketball team as a power forward. He plays for Karnataka in the domestic tournaments, Pratyanshu Tomar got appointed by Bangalore Customs and Gst.

== Career ==
Tomar first represented the Indian youth team in 2018 playing three matches in the FIBA U18 Asian Championship - SABA Qualifier. Later in the same year, he played the FIBA U18 Asian Championship.

He made his senior India debut in the FIBA Asia Cup 2021 Qualifiers and played three matches in the FIBA Asia Cup in 2022. In 2023, he played the FIBA Basketball World Cup 2023 Asian Qualifiers. In 2025, he took part in the FIBA Asia Cup 2025 Qualifiers. Later in August 2025, he played the main event of the Asia Cup 2025 at Jeddah, Saudi Arabia. In the first match, India lost against higher ranked Jordan, where Tomar scored 11 points. Later, he also played for the Indian team in the FIBA Basketball World Cup 2027 Asian Qualifiers.
