= BSN All-Star Game =

- Status: Active
- Frequency: Annually
- Inaugurated: 1982
- Most recent: 2025
- Organizer: BSN

The BSN All-Star Game (also known as BSN Juego de Estrellas) is an annual basketball event in Puerto Rico, organised by the Baloncesto Superior Nacional, the country's major basketball league.

== History ==
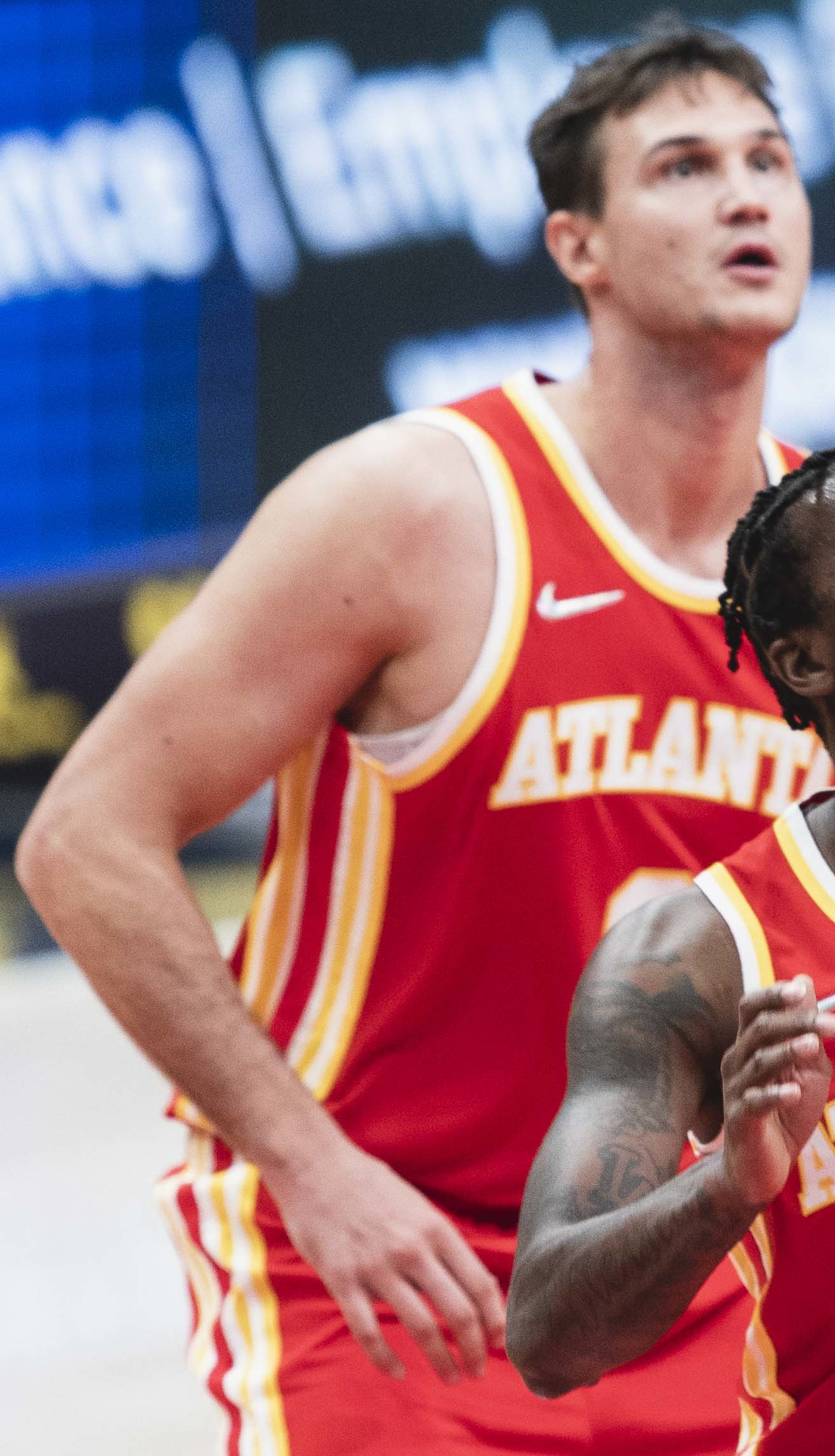
Italian Danilo Gallinari played in the 2025 edition, winning the long-shootout contest.

The first games were between a North East and a North West selection, a format that lasted for decades.

The 1982 edition presented players like Georgie Torres, Nestor Cora, Angelo Cruz, Cachorro Santiago, Panamanian Rolando Frazer, Mario Butler, Elisha McSweeney, Angelo Cruz and Jim Maldonado among others. The following year Teofilo Cruz was honored during the event.

In 2008 a selection from Puerto-Rican NCAA players faced the BSN young All-Stars before the main game. In 2023, a celebrities' match was also introduced and included sporting personalities like Floyd Mayweather and artists like Myke Towers.

Many legendary and former NBA players like Danilo Gallinari, Rolando Frazer, Jerome Mincy, Corey Benjamin, Larry Ayuso, Angelo Cruz, José Ortiz, Carlos Arroyo have featured in the event.

The majority of the All-Star Games have been held at the Roberto Clemente Coliseum in San Juan.

== List of games ==
Bold: Team that won the game.

Year	Date / Location	Team 1	Score	Team 2	MVP	Club
1982	Roberto Clemente Coliseum, San Juan	**North East All Stars**	**110**-109	South East All Stars		
1983	Roberto Clemente Coliseum, San Juan					
1984	Roberto Clemente Coliseum, San Juan					
1985	Roberto Clemente Coliseum, San Juan	North East All Stars	109-**112**	**South East All Stars**		
1986	Roberto Clemente Coliseum, San Juan					
1987	Roberto Clemente Coliseum, San Juan					
1988		**North East All Stars**	**113**-107	South East All Stars		
1989	Roberto Clemente Coliseum, San Juan					
1990	Roberto Clemente Coliseum, San Juan	North East All Stars	104-**105**	**South East All Stars**		
1991	Roberto Clemente Coliseum, San Juan	North East All Stars	121-**126**	**South East All Stars**	(Puerto Rico) Jerome Mincy	Vaqueros de Bayamón
1999	Arquelio Torres Ramírez Coliseum, San Germán	**North East All Stars**	**108**-104	South East All Stars		
2000	17 June	**South West All Stars**	**122**-110	North West All Stars	(United States) Kebu Stewart	Atléticos de San Germán
2001		Team Puerto Rico	77-**87**	**Imports**		
2002						
2004						
2005		**Team Puerto Rico**	**92**-89	Team BSN	(Puerto Rico) Elías Larry Ayuso	Capitanes de Arecibo
2006	7 May, Ponce	**Team Puerto Rico**	**108**-92	Team BSN	(Puerto Rico) Alejandro Carmona	Vaqueros de Bayamón
2007	9 June	**Domestic Team**	**139**-87	Imports Team	(Puerto Rico) Rick Apodaca	Atléticos de San Germán
2008		**Island Division All-Stars**	**98**-84	Metro Division All-Stars	(Puerto Rico) Peter John Ramos	Criollos de Caguas
2010	20 April, Guaynabo	**Natives**	**109**-95	Imports	(United States) Carmelo Antrone Lee	Vaqueros de Bayamón
2011						
2016	18 September, Mayagüez					
2017	29 May, Aguada	**Team East**	**125**-120	Team West	(Puerto Rico) Carlos Arroyo	Cariduros de Fajardo
2018	24 June	**Team Puerto Rico**	**80**-78	BSN Stars	(Puerto Rico) Jorge Díaz	Piratas de Quebradillas
2019	6 May	**South**	**134**-128	North	(Puerto Rico) Carlos Arroyo	Cariduros de Fajardo
2020	Not held due to COVID-19					
2021	11 September, Coliseo Manuel Iguina, Arecibo	**Team Huertas**	**136**-116	Team Benito	(Puerto Rico) Jezreel De Jesus	Leones de Ponce
2022	29 May, Quebradillas	**Team Walter Hodge**	**152**-149	Team Benito Santiago	(United States) Tyquan Rolon	Mets de Guaynabo
2023	Roberto Clemente Coliseum, San Juan	**Team Tjader Fernández**	**69**-68	Team Romero	(United States) (Libya) Paris Bass	Capitanes de Arecibo
2024	5 July, Palacio de Recreación y Deportes, Mayagüez	**Team East**	**160**-138	Team West	(Puerto Rico) Ismael Cruz	Gigantes de Carolina
2025	6 June	**Los D Aquí**	**136**-123	Los Refuerzos	(Dominican Republic) Víctor Liz	Capitanes de Arecibo
2026	16 May, Roberto Clemente Coliseum, San Juan	**Team Metro (A)**	**141**-134	Team Isla (B)	(Puerto Rico) Ismael Romero	Mets de Guaynabo

== Score sheets ==
- All-Star Game 1985:

DATE:
VENUE: Roberto Clemente Coliseum, San Juan
SCORE: North East - South East 109–112

North East All Stars: Mario Butler, José Sosa, Georgie Torres, Wes Correa, Jerome Mincy (starters); .

South East All Stars: Jeffrey Carrión, Rolando Frazer, Cachorro Santiago, José Ortiz, Frankie Torruellas (starters); .

- All-Star Game 1988:

DATE:
VENUE: Roberto Clemente Coliseum, San Juan
SCORE: North East - South East 113–107

North East All Stars: Angelo Cruz, Federico López, Mario Morales, Edgar de León, Ramón Rivas. (starters); . Coach: Carlos Morales

South East All Stars: James Carter, Bobby Ríos, Edwin Pellot, Rolando Frazer, José Ortiz (starters); . Coach: Flor Melendez

- All-Star Game 1990:

DATE:
VENUE: Roberto Clemente Coliseum, San Juan
SCORE: North East - South East 104–105

North East All Stars: Georgie Torres, Federico López, Wes Correa, Edgar de León, Ramón Rivas. (starters); .

South East All Stars: James Carter, Jose Agosto, Rolando Frazer, Edwin Pellot, Ian Lockhart (starters); .

- All-Star Game 2021:

DATE: September 11, 2021
VENUE: Coliseo Manuel Iguina, Arecibo
SCORE: Benito - Huertas 116–136
MVP: Jezreel De Jesus (Team Huertas)

Team Benito All Stars: Benito Santiago Jr., Javier Mojica, José Juan Barea, Ángel Núñez, Ysmael Romero
Coach: Nelson Colón
Reserves: Ángel Rodríguez, David Stockton, Chris Ortiz, Alex Franklin, Mike Rosario, Wil Martínez, Renaldo Balkman

Team Huertas All Stars: David Huertas, Walter Hodge, Jezreel De Jesús, Paris Bass, Chinemelu Elonu
Coach: Rafael "Pachy" Cruz
Reserves: Víctor Liz, Tu Holloway, Gilberto Clavell, Jonathan Rodríguez, Justin Reyes, Jonathan Ocasio, Emmanuel Andújar

- All-Star Game 2022:

DATE: June 8, 2022
VENUE: Coliseo Raymond Dalmau, Quebradillas
SCORE: Walter - Benito 152–149
MVP: Tyquan Rolon (Team Walter)

Team Walter All Stars: Walter Hodge, Jezreel De Jesus, Chinemelu Elonu, David Huertas, Phillip Wheeler. (starters); .
Coach: Larry Ayuso
Reserves: Rondae Hollis-Jefferson, Tyquan Rolon, Ángel Rodríguez, Gary Browne, Gian Clavell, Mike Rosario, Gaby Belardo, Carlos Emory, Renaldo Balkman, Marvin Jones

Team Benito All Stars: Benito Santiago Jr., Emmanuel Andújar, Javier Mojica, J.J. Barea, Ismael Romero (starters); .
Coach: Nelson Colón
Reserves: George Conditt IV, Tremont Waters, Víctor Liz, Earl Clark, Chris Ortiz, Tjader Fernandez, Alex Abreu, Jared Ruiz, Jose Rodriguez, Gilberto Clavell

- All-Star Game 2023:

DATE: May 12-13 2023
VENUE: Roberto Clemente Coliseum, Santurce, San Juan
SCORE: Fernandez - Romero 127–129
MVP: Paris Bass (Team Fernandez)

Team Fernandez All Stars: Tjader Fernandez, Tremont Waters, Joshua Erazo, Tony Bishop, Devon Collier (starters);
Coach: Rafael "Pachy" Cruz
Reserves: Emmanuel Andújar, Gary Browne, Gaby Belardo, Isaiah Palermo, Jezreel De Jesus, Jordan Cintron, Timothy Soares, Paris Bass, Phillip Wheeler, Victor Liz

Team Romero All Stars: Ismael Romero, Walter Hodge, Javier Mojica, Benito Santiago Jr., Angel Matias . (starters);
Coach: Nelson Colón
Reserves: Alex Abreu, Alfonso Plummer, Brandon Knight, Chris Ortiz, David Stockton, Georgie Pacheco, Jacob Wiley, Isaac Sosa, Timajh Parker, Tyquan Rolon

- All-Star Game 2024:

DATE: June 8, 2024
VENUE: Palacio de Recreación y Deportes, Mayagüez
SCORE: West - East 136–160
MVP:

West All Stars: David Stockton, Alfonso Plummer, Jahlil Okafor, Josué Erazo, Phillip Wheeler. (starters); .
Coach: Juan Cardona
Reserves: Georgie Pacheco, Tjader Fernandez, Jezreel De Jesus, Jordan Cintron, Ángel Rodríguez, Sheldon Mac, Jordan Murphy, Isaiah Pineiro

East All Stars: Travis Trice, Walter Hodge, Angel Matias, Chris Ortiz, George Conditt IV (starters); .
Coach: J. J. Barea
Reserves: Jaysean Paige, Stephen Thompson, Ethan Thompson, Benito Santiago Jr., Rondae Hollis-Jefferson, Alex Morales, Ismael Romero, Isaac Sosa

- All-Star Game 2025:

DATE: June 7, 2025
VENUE: Coliseo Carlos Miguel Mangual, Canóvanas
SCORE: D' Aqui - Refuerzos 136–123
MVP:

Los D' Aqui All Stars: Ramses Melendez, Victor Liz, Ismael Romero, Walter Hodge, Angel Matias (starters); .
Coach:
Reserves: Andre Curbelo, Ángel Rodríguez, Christian Lopez, Alex Kappos, Isaac Sosa, Georgie Pacheco, Jezreel De Jesus, Jordan Murphy, Phillip Wheeler, Arnaldo Toro

Los Refuerzos All Stars: Emmanuel Mudiay, Travis Trice, Chris Duarte, Danilo Gallinari, Javale McGee (starters); .
Coach:
Reserves: Gabe York, Ian Clark, Brandon Knight, Louis King, Akil Mitchell, Kobi Simmons, Sam Waardenburg, Demarcus Cousins, Cheick Diallo, Thomas Robinson

- All-Star Game 2026:

DATE: May 16, 2026
VENUE: Roberto Clemente Coliseum, San Juan
SCORE: Metro - Isla 141–134
MVP: Ismael Romero, (Team Metro)

Team Metro All Stars (A): Travis Trice, Louis King, Christian Lopez, Isaiah Pineiro, Ismael Romero (starters);
. Coach: Wilhelmus Caanen
Reserves: Javier Mojica, Gary Browne, Jae Crowder, Jaylen Nowell, Tremont Waters, Hunter Tyson, Angel Matias, Walter Hodge, Tyler Cook, Brandon Knight

Team Isla All Stars (B): Andre Curbelo, Ramses Meléndez, Rigoberto Mendoza, Montrezl Harrell, Nick Perkins (starters); .
Coach: Eddie Casiano
Reserves: Sam Waardenburg, Tyrell Harrison, Nathan Sobey, Jezreel De Jesus, Stevie Thompson, Ivan Gandia-Rosa, Justin Reyes, Jack Mcveigh, Phillip Wheeler, Emmanuel Mudiay

== Three-Point Shootout Contest ==
Season	Player	Team
2002	(Puerto Rico) Larry Ayuso	Atléticos de San Germán
2006	(United States) Bobby Lazor	Leones de Ponce
2010	(United States) James Maye	Indios de Mayagüez
2017	(Puerto Rico) Isaac Sosa	Atléticos de San Germán
2018	(Puerto Rico) Raymond Cintron Cortes	Capitanes de Arecibo
2019	(Puerto Rico) Raymond Cintron Cortes	Capitanes de Arecibo
2021	(Puerto Rico) Jonathan Rodriguez	Capitanes de Arecibo
2022	(Puerto Rico) Raymond Cintron Cortes	Capitanes de Arecibo
2023	(Puerto Rico) Tjader Fernandez	Capitanes de Arecibo
2024	(Puerto Rico) Tjader Fernandez	Capitanes de Arecibo
2025	(Puerto Rico) Tjader Fernandez	Capitanes de Arecibo
2026	(Puerto Rico) Kenneth Santos	Leones de Ponce

== Slam-Dunk winners ==
Season	Player	Team
2000	(Puerto Rico) Rick Apodaca	Vaqueros de Bayamón
2006	(Dominican Republic) (Puerto Rico) David Anderson	
2010	(United States) Leroy Hickerson	Atléticos de San Germán
2017	(Puerto Rico) Carlos Emory	Leones de Ponce
2018	(United States) (Puerto Rico) Diego Maldonado	Atléticos de San Germán
2019	(United States) (Puerto Rico) Diego Maldonado	Atléticos de San Germán
2021	(Puerto Rico) Justin Reyes	Indios de Mayagüez
2022	(Puerto Rico) Carlos Emory	Quebradillas Pirates
2023	(United States) Phillip Wheeler	Quebradillas Pirates
2025	(United States) Phillip Wheeler (Puerto Rico) Ramses Meléndez	Quebradillas Pirates; Indios de Mayagüez
2026	(Puerto Rico) Dyondre Dominguez	Gigantes de Carolina

== Skill Challenge winners ==
Season	Player	Team
2018	(Puerto Rico) Kyle Vinales	Caciques de Humacao
2021	(Puerto Rico) K. J. Maura	Cariduros de Fajardo
2022	(Puerto Rico) Tjader Fernandez	Atléticos de San Germán
2026	(Puerto Rico) Tjader Fernandez	Leones de Ponce

== Long-distance shootout ==
Season	Player	Team
2025	(Italy) Danilo Gallinari	Vaqueros de Bayamón

== Topscorers ==
Season	Player	Points	Team
2000	(United States) Kebu Stewart	29	Atléticos de San Germán
2001	(United States) Abdul Shamsid-Deen	17	Maratonistas de Coamo
2006	(United States) Corey Benjamin	34	Mets de Guaynabo
2007	(Puerto Rico) Rick Apodaca	34	Atléticos de San Germán
2008	(Puerto Rico) Ricardo Melendez	24	Criollos de Caguas
2010	(Australia) Shawn Redhage	20	Piratas de Quebradillas
2017	(Dominican Republic) Víctor Liz	26	Leones de Ponce
2018	(Puerto Rico) Jorge Díaz	18	Piratas de Quebradillas
2019	(Puerto Rico) Jezreel De Jesus	28	Capitanes de Arecibo
2020	Season Cancelled	Covid	Season Cancelled
2021	(Puerto Rico) Jezreel De Jesus	31	
2022	(United States) Tyquan Rolon	21	Mets de Guaynabo
2023	(United States) (Libya) Paris Bass	20	Capitanes de Arecibo
2024	(Puerto Rico) Ismael Cruz	32	Gigantes de Carolina
2025	(Dominican Republic) Víctor Liz	29	Capitanes de Arecibo
2026	(United States) Montrezl Harrell	26	Atléticos de San Germán

== Players with most selections ==
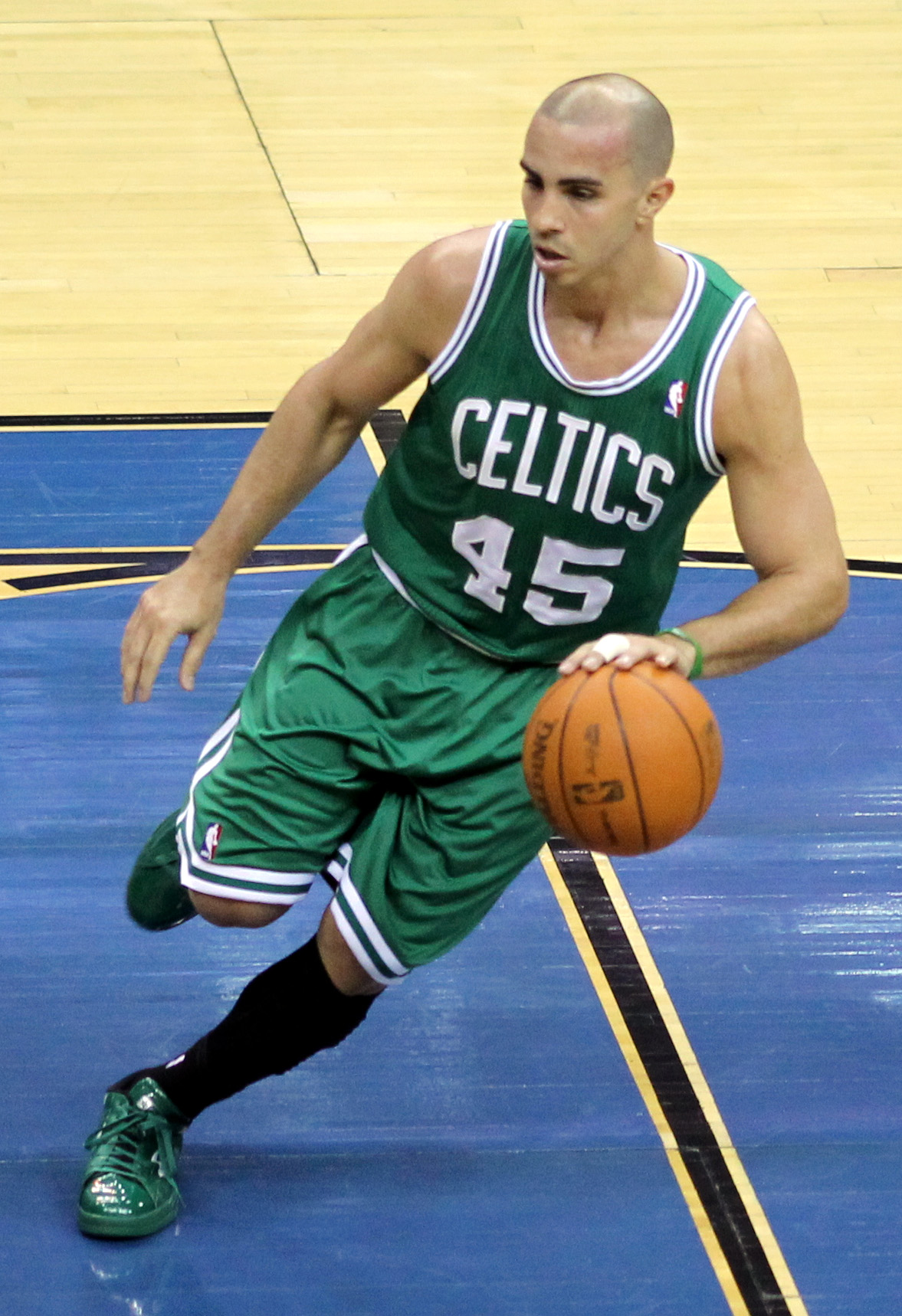
Carlos Arroyo won the MVP award twice.

Player	All-Star	Editions	Notes
(Puerto Rico) Elías Larry Ayuso	5	2001, 2006–2008, 2010	1x MVP
(Puerto Rico) José Ortiz	5	1983, 1985, 1988, 1999, 2004	
(Puerto Rico) Jerome Mincy	4	1985, 1987, 1991, 2001	1x MVP
(Puerto Rico) Carlos Arroyo	4	2000, 2001 (DNP), 2017, 2019	2x MVP
(Puerto Rico) Christian Dalmau	4	2000, 2001, 2004, 2010	
(Puerto Rico) Georgie Torres	3	1982, 1985, 1990	
(Panama) Rolando Frazer	3	1982, 1987, 1990	
(Puerto Rico) James Carter	3	1988, 1990, 2000	
(Puerto Rico) Angelo Cruz	3	1982, 1985	
(Puerto Rico) Cachorro Santiago	3	1982, 1985	
(The Bahamas) Ian Lockhart	3	1990, 2000, 2001	
(United States) Nick Davis	3	2000, 2001, 2004	
(Puerto Rico) Bobby Lazor	3	2004, 2006, 2007	
(Panama) Mario Butler	2	1982, 1985	
(Puerto Rico) Ricardo Dalmau	2	2000, 2001	
(Puerto Rico) Eddie Casiano	2	2000, 2004	
(Puerto Rico) Rick Apodaca	2	2004, 2007	

== Distinctions ==
=== FIBA Hall of Fame ===
- (Puerto Rico) José Ortiz
- (Puerto Rico) Angelo Cruz

=== FIBA's 50 Greatest Players ===
- (Puerto Rico) Angelo Cruz

== See also ==
- Baloncesto Superior Nacional

== Visual content ==
- 1982 BSN All-Star Game on YouTube
- 1985 BSN All-Star Game on YouTube
- 1990 BSN All-Star Game on YouTube
- 1991 BSN All-Star Game on YouTube
- 2024 BSN All-Star Game on YouTube
- 2025 BSN All-Star Game Contests on YouTube
- 2005 BSN All-Star Game Contests on YouTube
- 2000 BSN All-Star Game on YouTube
- 1988 All-Star Game video
- 1991 All-Star Game video
- 1999 BSN All-Star Game video
- 1983 All-Star Game video
