= 2026 Baloncesto Superior Nacional season =

Baloncesto Superior Nacional
- Season: 2026
- Duration: March 21 – August 23
- Games played: 34
- Teams: 12
- TV partners: Reg. Season; Telemundo Puerto Rico Youtube TV; Playoffs; Telemundo Puerto Rico Youtube TV; NBC Sports Regional Networks (Boston, Philadelphia, California)

Regular season
- Season MVP: Travis Trice

Finals
- Champions: Vaqueros de Bayamón (18x)
- Runners-up: Santeros de Aguada
- Finals MVP: Renaldo Balkman

Statistical leaders
Points	(United States) Jaylen Nowell	22.4
Rebounds	(United States) Moses Brown	10.6
Assists	(United States) Travis Trice	10.1

The 2026 Baloncesto Superior Nacional season is the 97th season of the Baloncesto Superior Nacional (BSN). The Vaqueros de Bayamón comes into the season as the defending champions, winning the 2025 BSN Finals. The regular season began on March 21 and ended on June 29.

== 2026 BSN season ==
=== Rules Changes ===
- Salary Cap - A soft cap of $1 million and a hard cap of $1.5 million per team, an increase of $100,000 over the previous season.
- Reinforcements - A limit of a third reinforcement per team will remain for the season, but 6 changes to reinforcements are allowed before deadline, and an additional 2 replacements in postseason.

==== Arena Changes ====
- Mario Morales Coliseum, the home of the Mets de Guaynabo is undergoing renovations, will be playing their homes at Coliseo Fernando "Rube" Hernández in Gurabo.

==== TV Changes ====
Just before the start of the 2026 BSN playoffs, the league had announced it had reached a broadcasting agreement with NBC Sports and Peacock, to transmit the conference finals and league finals to viewers through its regional sports networks in Boston, Philadelphia, and California.

==== Notable Reinforcements ====
- NBA - US
  - Malik Beasley - Cangrejeros de Santurce
  - Jae Crowder - Vaqueros de Bayamón
  - Montrezl Harrell - Atléticos de San Germán
  - Kenneth Faried - Cangrejeros de Santurce
- NBL - AU
- Xavier Cooks - Vaqueros de Bayamón
- Jaylin Galloway - Vaqueros de Bayamón
- Tyrell Harrison - Indios de Mayagüez
- Nathan Sobey - Indios de Mayagüez
- Sam Waardenburg - Indios de Mayagüez

==== FIBA Suspensions ====
On July 9th, Harrell was suspended by the BSN until January 29, 2027, for failing a protocol during an out-of-competition doping test in Australia on January 29, 2025. Ruling him out of the playoffs, as a consequence the two-year ineligibility sanction imposed by Basketball Australia and Sport Integrity Australia on June 30, 2026.

== Teams ==
=== Venues and locations ===
Baloncesto Superior Nacional
Location of full BSN members: Metro Div. (A) members, Isla Div. (B) members

Team	Location	Arena	Capacity	Conference
Atléticos de San Germán	San Germán	Arquelio Torres Ramírez Coliseum	5,000	B
Cangrejeros de Santurce	Santurce	Roberto Clemente Coliseum	9,000	A
Capitanes de Arecibo	Arecibo	Manuel Iguina Coliseum	12,000	B
Criollos de Caguas	Caguas	Coliseo Roger Mendoza	3,000	A
Gigantes de Carolina	Carolina	Guillermo Angulo Coliseum	5,000	A
Indios de Mayagüez	Mayagüez	Palacio de Recreación y Deportes	5,500	B
Leones de Ponce	Ponce	Juan Pachín Vicéns Auditorium	11,000	B
Mets de Guaynabo	Guaynabo	Mario Morales Coliseum	5,500	A
Osos de Manatí	Manatí	Juan Cruz Abreu Coliseum	8,000	A
Piratas de Quebradillas	Quebradillas	Raymond Dalmau Coliseum	5,500	B
Santeros de Aguada	Aguada	Ismael Delgado Coliseum	6,000	B
Vaqueros de Bayamón	Bayamón	Ruben Rodriguez Coliseum	12,000	A

=== Personnel and sponsorship ===
Team	Head coach	Kit manufacturer	Jersey sponsor
Atléticos de San Germán	(Puerto Rico) Eddie Casiano 5th season		Allied Car & Truck Rental, El Mesón Sándwiches
Cangrejeros de Santurce	(Puerto Rico) Nelson Colón 2nd season	Adidas	None.
Capitanes de Arecibo	(Puerto Rico) Juan Cardona	AC Sports	PenFed Credit Union
Criollos de Caguas	(Puerto Rico) Wilhelmus Caanen	Optime Sports	Calesa Toyota
Gigantes de Carolina	(Puerto Rico) Carlos Gonzalez		Marco's Pizza
Indios de Mayagüez	(Puerto Rico) Ivan "Pipo" Velez		Rincón Rental, Windmar Home
Leones de Ponce	(Puerto Rico) Carlos Rivera	AC Sports	Claro, EcoMaxx
Mets de Guaynabo	(Puerto Rico) Jorge Rincon	Monarch	Brava Lubricants, Me Salvé
Osos de Manatí	(Puerto Rico) Iván Ríos	Wilson's Stuff (PR)	
Piratas de Quebradillas	(Puerto Rico) Angel Daniel Vassallo	AC Sports	Sixt
Santeros de Aguada	(Puerto Rico) Rafael "Pachy" Cruz		Coop Rincón, SpeedyNet
Vaqueros de Bayamón	(Puerto Rico) Christian Dalmau 2nd season	Optime Sports	Goya Foods

=== Reinforcement list ===
List of each teams 2026 Reinforcements
#	Aguada	Arecibo	Bayamon	Caguas	Carolina	Guaynabo	Manati	Mayaguez	Ponce	Quebradillas	San German	Santurce
1	Jacob Wiley (C)	Derrick Walton Jr	Jassel Pérez (SG)	Louis King (SF)	DeAndre Williams (PF)	Malik Williams (C)	Cheick Diallo (C)	Eugene German (PG)	Brady Manek (PF)	Anthony Cowan Jr. (PG)	Alex Hamilton (G/F)	Kenneth Faried (C)
2	Joel Soriano (C)	Isaiah Miles (PF)	Damian Jones (C)	Moses Brown (C)	Jaylen Nowell (SG)	Max Abmas (PG)	Jameer Nelson Jr. (PG)	Nathan Sobey (PG)	Jalen Crutcher (PG)	Emmanuel Mudiay (SG)	Devon Daniels (SG)	Ian Clark (G/F)
3	Rigoberto Mendoza (SG)	Timothy Soares (C)	Chris McCullough (PF)	Travis Trice (PG)	Open	Torrey Craig (F)	Kristian Doolittle (PF)	Tyrell Harrison (C)	Thomas Robinson (C)	Grant Basile (C)	Nick Perkins (C)	DJ Wilson (C)

== Regular season ==
=== Standings ===
Conference A Standings
	W	L	PCT	GB	Home	Road	GP
y- Vaqueros de Bayamón	22	12	.647	–	14–3	8–9	34
x- Criollos de Caguas	22	12	.647	–	15–2	7–10	34
x- Cangrejeros de Santurce	19	15	.559	3	9–8	10-7	34
x- Gigantes de Carolina	18	16	.521	4	9–8	9–8	34
Osos de Manatí	15	19	.441	7	11–6	4–13	34
Mets de Guaynabo	14	20	.412	8	8–9	6–11	34

Updated to match(es) played on 29 June 2026. Source: BSN

Conference B Standings
	W	L	PCT	GB	Home	Road	GP
y- Atléticos de San Germán	21	13	.618	–	12-5	9–8	34
x- Capitanes de Arecibo	18	16	.529	3	12–5	6–11	34
x- Santeros de Aguada	17	17	.500	4	10–7	7–10	34
x- Leones de Ponce	15	19	.441	6	10–7	5–12	34
Indios de Mayagüez	13	21	.382	8	6–11	7–10	34
Piratas de Quebradillas	10	24	.294	11	7–10	3–14	34

Updated to match(es) played on 29 June 2026. Source: BSN

Notes

- y – Clinched division title
- x – Clinched playoff spot

=== Statistics ===
==== Individual statistic leaders ====
*Minimum of 15 games played needed to be considered.

Category	Player	Team	Statistic
Points per game	(United States) Jaylen Nowell	Gigantes de Carolina	22.4
Rebounds per game	(United States) Moses Brown	Criollos de Caguas	10.6
Assists per game	(United States) Travis Trice	Criollos de Caguas	10.1
Steals per game	(Dominican Republic) Jassel Pérez	Vaqueros de Bayamón	2.2
Blocks per game	(United States) Moses Brown	Criollos de Caguas	2.1
FG%	(Puerto Rico) Devon Collier	Cangrejeros de Santurce	70.8%
3FG%	(Puerto Rico) Christian López	Criollos de Caguas	51.5%
FT%	(Puerto Rico) Emmanuel Maldonado	Cangrejeros de Santurce	100.0%

==== Team statistic leaders ====
Category	Team	Statistic
Points per game	Criollos de Caguas	100.6
Rebounds per game	Criollos de Caguas	37.6
Assists per game	Criollos de Caguas	24.8
Steals per game	Vaqueros de Bayamón	8.9
Blocks per game	Vaqueros de Bayamón; Indios de Mayaguez	3.4
FG%	Leones de Ponce	50.0%
3FG%	Criollos de Caguas	39.7%

=== BSN All-Star Game ===
External videos
- 2026 BSN All-Star Game | Spanish

DATE: May 16, 2026
VENUE: Roberto Clemente Coliseum, San Juan
SCORE: Metro - Isla 141–134

Team Metro All Stars (A): Travis Trice, Louis King, Christian Lopez, Isaiah Pineiro, Ismael Romero (starters);
. Coach: Wilhelmus Caanen
Reserves: Javier Mojica, Gary Browne, Jae Crowder, Jaylen Nowell, Tremont Waters, Hunter Tyson, Angel Matias, Walter Hodge, Tyler Cook, Brandon Knight

Team Isla All Stars (B): Andre Curbelo, Ramses Meléndez, Rigoberto Mendoza, Montrezl Harrell, Nick Perkins (starters); .
Coach: Eddie Casiano
Reserves: Sam Waardenburg, Tyrell Harrison, Nathan Sobey, Jezreel De Jesus, Stevie Thompson, Ivan Gandia-Rosa, Justin Reyes, Jack Mcveigh, Phillip Wheeler, Emmanuel Mudiay

External videos
- 2026 BSN All-Star Competitions | ES

- Three-Point Shootout Contest Winner: (Puerto Rico) Kenneth Santos, Leones de Ponce
- Skill Challenge Winner: (Puerto Rico) Tjader Fernandez, Leones de Ponce
- Slam-Dunk Contest Winner: (Puerto Rico) Dyondre Dominguez, Gigantes de Carolina

=== End of Season Awards ===
On June 30, 2026, the league announced the end of season award winners; with Travis Trice being named the league's Most Valuable Player.

==== Season Awards ====
- Most Valuable Player: (United States) Travis Trice — Criollos de Caguas (18.3 PPG, 10.1 APG, 3.3 RPG)
- Defensive Player of the Year: (United States) Moses Brown — Criollos de Caguas (12.6 PPG, 1.8 APG, 2.6 RPG)
- Rookie of the Year: : (Puerto Rico) Daniel Rivera —Gigantes De Carolina (9.4 PPG, 1.1 APG, 4.5 RPG)
- Sixth Man of the Year: (Puerto Rico) Christian López — Criollos de Caguas (12.6 PPG, 1.8 APG, 2.6 RPG)
- Most Improved Player of the Year: (Puerto Rico) Andre Curbelo — Atleticos de San German (15.7 PPG, 6.7 APG, 6.4 RPG)
- Coach of the Year: Christian Dalmau, Vaqueros de Bayamón
- GM of the Year: Jose "Cheo" Rivera, Atletics de San German
- All-BSN First Team:
  - Travis Trice, Criollos de Caguas
  - Andre Curbelo, Atleticos de San German
  - Montrezl Harrell, Atléticos de San Germán
  - Jaylen Nowell, Gigantes de Carolina
  - Moses Brown, Criollos de Caguas

==== Finals Awards ====
- 2026 Finals Most Valuable Player: (Puerto Rico) Renaldo Balkman (8.6 PPG, 5.4 RPG, 1.3 APG)

== BSN Playoffs ==
=== Playoff Bracket ===
All rounds are a best-of-seven series; a series ended when one team won four games, and that team advanced to the next round.

- Updated to match(es) played on August 25, 2026.

Quarterfinals
1A	Vaqueros de Bayamón	4
4A	Gigantes de Carolina	1
2A	Criollos de Caguas	4
3A	Cangrejeros de Santurce	2
1B	Atléticos de San Germán	1
4B	Leones de Ponce	4
2B	Capitanes de Arecibo	2
3B	Santeros de Aguada	4

Semifinals
1A	Vaqueros de Bayamón	4
2A	Criollos de Caguas	2
4B	Leones de Ponce	2
3B	Santeros de Aguada	4

Finals
1A	Vaqueros de Bayamón	4
3B	Santeros de Aguada	3

== La Final ==
The 2026 Final (also known as the 2026 La Final Brava for sponsorship reasons) is the championship series of the Baloncesto Superior Nacional (BSN)'s 2026 season and conclusion to the season's playoffs. The final's series is a best-of-seven alternating venues after every game between the final two teams: Vaqueros de Bayamón and Santeros de Aguada.

=== Series schedule ===
Game	Date	Road team	Result	Home team
Game 1	August 9	Santeros de Aguada	75–91 (0–1)	Vaqueros de Bayamón
Game 2	August 12	Vaqueros de Bayamón	87–86 (2–0)	Santeros de Aguada
Game 3	August 14	Santeros de Aguada	95–93 (1–2)	Vaqueros de Bayamón
Game 4	August 16	Vaqueros de Bayamón	64–67 (2–2)	Santeros de Aguada
Game 5	August 19	Santeros de Aguada	79–97 (2–3)	Vaqueros de Bayamón
Game 6	August 21	Vaqueros de Bayamón	82-76 (3-3)	Santeros de Aguada
Game 7	August 23	Santeros de Aguada	81-74 (3-4)	Vaqueros de Bayamón

=== Game summaries ===
Note: Times are EDT (UTC−4) as listed by the BSN.

==== Game 1 ====
YouTube WKAQ-TV

August 9
8:15 pm GMT

Recap

Santeros de Aguada 75, Vaqueros de Bayamón 91
Scoring by quarter: 13–23, 15–22, 22–19, 25–27
Pts: Rigoberto Mendoza 13; Rebs: Jacob Wiley 8 Asts: Rigoberto Mendoza 5	Pts: Gary Browne 22; Rebs: Damian Jones 15; Asts: Gary Browne 5
Bayamón leads series, 1–0

Coliseo Rubén Rodríguez, Bayamón, Puerto Rico

The defending champions, Vaqueros de Bayamón, defeated the Santeros de Aguada 91-75 at the Ruben Rodriguez Coliseum to take advantage 1-0 in the Final Brava 2026 of the BSN.

Gary Browne led the Cowboys' offense with 22 points and five assists. Damian Jones dominated the painting with a 20-point double-double and 15 rebounds, Jassel Perez added 16 points and Stephen Thompson Jr. contributed 10.

For the Santeros, Rigoberto Mendoza and Matthew Lee scored 13 points each. Ivan Gandia added 12, Joel Soriano contributed 11 and Jacob Wiley finished with 10.

==== Game 2 ====
YouTube WKAQ-TV

August 12
8:15 pm GMT

Recap

Vaqueros de Bayamón 87, Santeros de Aguada 86
Scoring by quarter: 23–24, 20–21, 30–24, 14–17
Pts: Jassel Pérez 22; Rebs: Damian Jones 8 Asts: Jassel Pérez 7	Pts: Joel Soriano 21; Rebs: Joel Soriano 10; Asts: Rigoberto Mendoza 10
Bayamón leads series, 2–0

Coliseo Ismael Chavalillo Delgado, Aguada, Puerto Rico

Bayamón achieved a late minute major victory on the road by defeating the Santeros de Aguada 87-86 at the Ismael “Chavalillo” Delgado Coliseum to take advantage 2-0 in the Final Brava 2026 of the BSN. After the game, the league suspended and fined Damian Jones of Bayamon as a result of his misconduct. With 49 seconds to go, when his fifth personal foul was managed, Jones tore his game shirt, threw it into the public and violently knocked on a door of the sports facility when he made head for the dressing room.

Jassel Pérez led the Cowboys with 21 points, five rebounds and seven assists. Chris McCullough added 17 points and six rebounds, while Damian Jones had 11 points and eight rebounds.

For the Santeros, Joel Soriano recorded a double-double of 21 points and 10 rebounds. Rigoberto Mendoza added 20 points, six rebounds and nine assists.

==== Game 3 ====
YouTube WKAQ-TV

August 14
8:15 pm GMT

Recap

Santeros de Aguada 95, Vaqueros de Bayamón 93 (OT)
Scoring by quarter: 17–25, 19–15, 30–28, 19–17, Overtime: 10–8
Pts: Rigoberto Mendoza 16; Rebs: Jacob Wiley 12; Asts: Rigoberto Mendoza 6	Pts: Jassel Pérez 25; Rebs: Gary Browne 11; Asts: Gary Browne 11
Bayamón leads series, 2–1

Coliseo Rubén Rodríguez, Bayamón, Puerto Rico

Santeros de Aguada won on the road defeating Bayamón 95-93 in overtime, at the Rubén Rodríguez Coliseum to get their first victory in the Final Brava 2026.

Manny Camper led the collective effort of the Santeros with 14 points and seven rebounds. Antonio Ralat added 13 points, Rigoberto Mendoza contributed 16 points, nine rebounds and five assists, Joel Soriano finished with 12 points and seven rebounds, and Ivan Gandia contributed 11 points.

For Bayamón, Jassel Pérez led the offense with 25 points, six rebounds and nine assists. Javier Mojica added 18 points, while Renaldo Balkman finished with 15 points, nine rebounds and three steals. Gary Browne grazed the triple-double with six points, 10 rebounds and 11 assists, Jordan Cintron had 13 points and Chris McCullough finished with 10.

==== Game 4 ====
YouTube WKAQ-TV

August 16
8:15 pm GMT

Recap

Vaqueros de Bayamón 64, Santeros de Aguada 67
Scoring by quarter: 14–24, 14–18, 20–10, 16–15
Pts: Renaldo Balkman 12; Rebs: Damian Jones 11; Asts: Gary Browne 7	Pts: Rigoberto Mendoza 22; Rebs: Joel Soriano 8 Asts: Ivan Gandia 5
Series tied, 2–2

Coliseo Ismael Chavalillo Delgado, Aguada, Puerto Rico

Rigoberto Mendoza led Aguada with 22 points and five rebounds. Manny Camper added 16 points and four rebounds, while Ivan Gandia and Jacob Wiley each had nine points.

For Bayamón, Renaldo Balkman finished with 12 points and nine rebounds. Damian Jones had a double-double of 11 points and 11 rebounds, Gary Browne added 10 points, four rebounds and five assists, and Chris McCullough finished with 10 points.

==== Game 5 ====
YouTube WKAQ-TV

August 19
8:15 pm GMT

Recap

Santeros de Aguada 79, Vaqueros de Bayamón 97
Scoring by quarter: 19–33, 18–20, 26–30, 16–14
Pts: Joel Soriano 18; Rebs: Jacob Wiley 6 Asts: Rigoberto Mendoza 6	Pts: Jassel Pérez 25; Rebs: Three players 6 Asts: Jassel Pérez 6
Bayamón leads series, 3–2

Coliseo Rubén Rodríguez, Bayamón, Puerto Rico

Chris McCullough led the Cowboys offense with 25 points and six rebounds. Jassel Perez added 22 points, six rebounds and six assists, Gary Browne had 14 points and five assists, while Javier Mojica finished with 11 points.

For the Santeros, Joel Soriano led with 18 points and four rebounds. Jacob Wiley added 14 points, John Holland finished with eight, while Manny Camper and Ivan Gandia each had six points

==== Game 6 ====
YouTube WKAQ-TV

August 21
8:15 pm GMT

Recap

Vaqueros de Bayamón 76, Santeros de Aguada 82
Scoring by quarter: 23–14, 25–18, 18–31, 10–19
Pts: Jassel Pérez 20; Rebs: Jassel Pérez 6 Asts: Jassel Pérez 6	Pts: Rigoberto Mendoza 24; Rebs: Joel Soriano 13; Asts: Jacob Wiley 5
Series tied, 3–3

Coliseo Ismael Chavalillo Delgado, Aguada, Puerto Rico

Rigoberto Mendoza led the Santeros with 23 points and four assists. Joel Soriano posted a double-double of 17 points and 13 rebounds, Jacob Wiley added another with 12 points and 10 rebounds, while Manny Camper finished with 14 points.

For Bayamón, Jassel Pérez finished with 20 points, six rebounds and six assists. Stephen Thompson Jr. added 14 points, Damian Jones had 12 and Renaldo Balkman finished with 10.

==== Game 7 ====
YouTube WKAQ-TV

August 23
8:15 pm GMT

Recap

Santeros de Aguada 74, Vaqueros de Bayamón 81
Scoring by quarter: 16–18, 15–15, 24–24, 19–24
Pts: Joel Soriano 21; Rebs: Joel Soriano 7 Asts: Rigoberto Mendoza 8	Pts: Jassel Pérez 25; Rebs: Damian Jones 10; Asts: Gary Browne 5
Bayamón wins series, 4–3

Coliseo Rubén Rodríguez, Bayamón, Puerto Rico
