= 2025 Baloncesto Superior Nacional season =

Baloncesto Superior Nacional
- Season: 2025
- Duration: March 22 – August 11
- Games played: 34
- Teams: 12
- TV partner: Telemundo Puerto Rico

Regular season
- Season MVP: Emmanuel Mudiay

Finals
- Champions: Vaqueros de Bayamón (17x)
- Runners-up: Leones de Ponce
- Finals MVP: Danilo Gallinari

Statistical leaders
Points	(Democratic Republic of the Congo) Emmanuel Mudiay	23.6
Rebounds	(New Zealand) Tyrell Harrison	10.1
Assists	(Nigeria) Miye Oni	7.2

The 2025 Baloncesto Superior Nacional season is the 96th season of the Baloncesto Superior Nacional (BSN). Criollos de Caguas came into the season as the defending champions, winning the 2024 BSN Finals. The regular season began on March 22, and ended on June 30.

== League News ==
=== Rules Changes ===
- Reinforcements - 11 of the 12 BSN franchises voted in favor of the entry of a third reinforcement for BSN's upcoming 2025 season. Carolina voted against.

== Teams ==
Locations of BSN arenas

Team	Location	Arena	Capacity
Atléticos de San Germán	San Germán	Arquelio Torres Ramírez Coliseum	5,000
Cangrejeros de Santurce	Santurce	Roberto Clemente Coliseum	9,000
Capitanes de Arecibo	Arecibo	Manuel Iguina Coliseum	12,000
Criollos de Caguas	Caguas	Coliseo Roger Mendoza	3,000
Gigantes de Carolina	Caguas	Coliseo Roger Mendoza	3,000
Indios de Mayagüez	Mayagüez	Palacio de Recreación y Deportes	5,500
Leones de Ponce	Ponce	Juan Pachín Vicéns Auditorium	11,000
Mets de Guaynabo	Guaynabo	Mario Morales Coliseum	5,500
Osos de Manatí	Manatí	Juan Cruz Abreu Coliseum	8,000
Piratas de Quebradillas	Quebradillas	Raymond Dalmau Coliseum	5,500
Santeros de Aguada	Aguada	Ismael Delgado Coliseum	6,000
Vaqueros de Bayamón	Bayamón	Ruben Rodriguez Coliseum	12,000

== Regular season ==
=== Standings ===
Group A

Pos	Team	Pld	W	L	GF	GA	GD	PCT	Qualification or relegation
1	Vaqueros de Bayamón	34	24	10	3124	2885	+239	.706	Qualification to playoffs
2	Cangrejeros de Santurce	34	22	12	3072	2983	+89	.647	Qualification to playoffs
3	Criollos de Caguas	34	18	16	3109	3106	+3	.529	Qualification to playoffs
4	Gigantes de Carolina	34	16	18	3063	3090	−27	.471	Qualification to playoffs
5	Mets de Guaynabo	34	13	21	3247	3327	−80	.382	
6	Osos de Manatí	34	8	26	3080	3268	−188	.235	

Updated to match(es) played on 30 June 2025. Source: BSN

Group B

Pos	Team	Pld	W	L	GF	GA	GD	PCT	Qualification or relegation
1	Indios de Mayagüez	34	21	13	3044	2957	+87	.618	Qualification to playoffs
2	Piratas de Quebradillas	34	20	14	3090	3079	+11	.588	Qualification to playoffs
3	Leones de Ponce	34	18	16	2999	2989	+10	.529	Qualification to playoffs
4	Capitanes de Arecibo	34	18	16	2950	2982	−32	.529	Qualification to playoffs
5	Atléticos de San Germán	34	15	19	3084	3075	+9	.441	
6	Santeros de Aguada	34	11	23	3055	3176	−121	.324	

Updated to match(es) played on 30 June 2025. Source: BSN

=== Statistics ===
==== Individual statistic leaders ====
Category	Player	Team	Statistic
Points per game	(United States) Emmanuel Mudiay	Piratas de Quebradillas	23.6
Rebounds per game	(New Zealand) Tyrell Harrison	Indios de Mayagüez	10.2
Assists per game	(Nigeria) Miye Oni	Criollos de Caguas	7.2
Steals per game	(United States) Alex Hamilton	Indios de Mayagüez	2.5
Blocks per game	(United States) JaVale McGee	Vaqueros de Bayamón	1.6
FG%	(Puerto Rico) Matt López	Piratas de Quebradillas	75.0%
3FG%	(Puerto Rico) Alexander Kappos	Criollos de Caguas	47.0%
FT%	(Puerto Rico) Leandro Allende	Santeros de Aguada	100.0%

==== Team statistic leaders ====
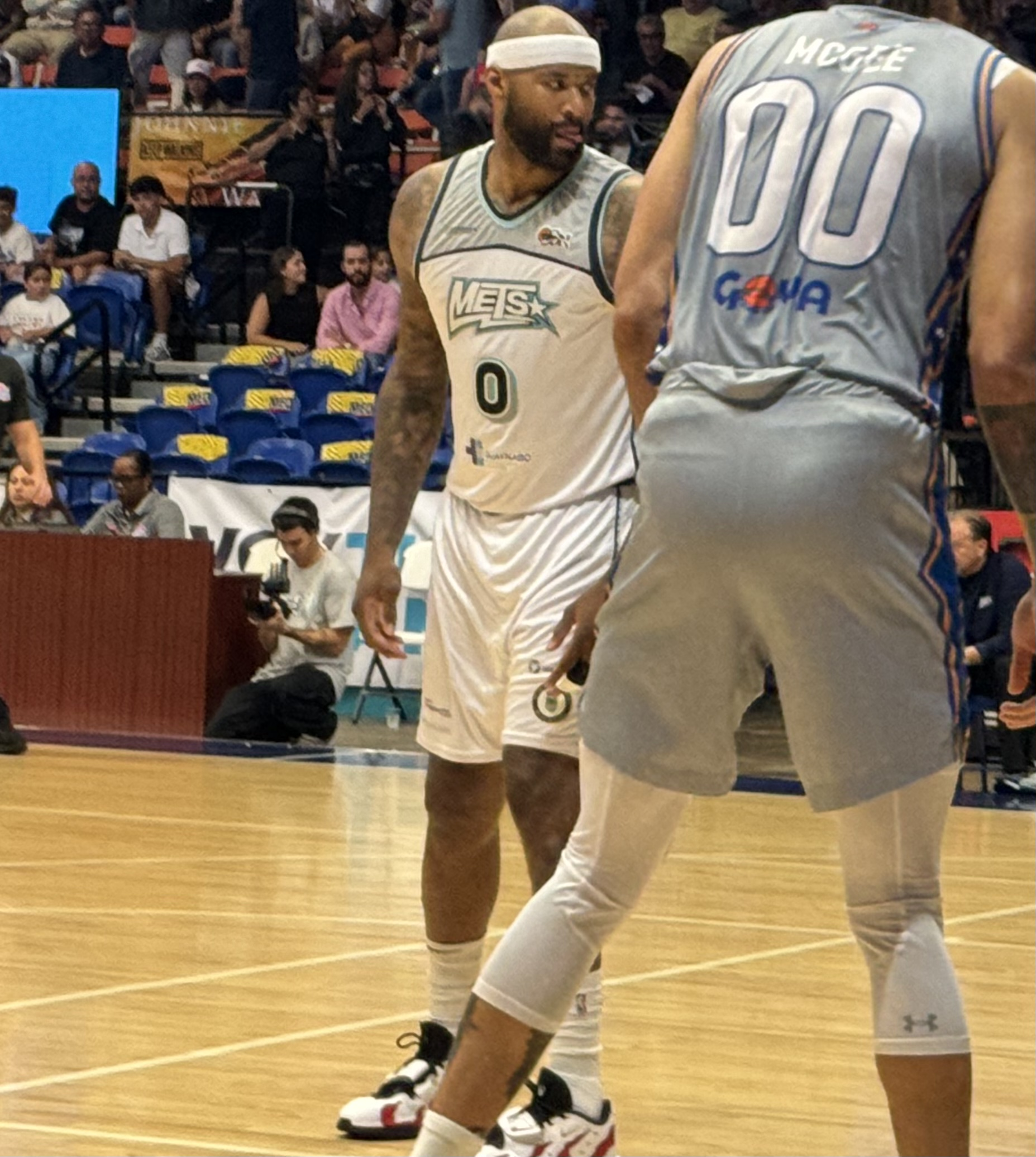
DeMarcus Cousins matched up against JaVale McGee in a game on May 16, 2025.

Category	Team	Statistic
Points per game	Mets de Guaynabo	94.9
Rebounds per game	Cangrejeros de Santurce	36.5
Assists per game	Criollos de Caguas	21.9
Steals per game	Vaqueros de Bayamón	8.3
Blocks per game	Vaqueros de Bayamón	3.4
FG%	Atléticos de San Germán	49.0%
3FG%	Mets de Guaynabo	38.0%

=== BSN All-Star Game ===
DATE: June 7, 2025
VENUE: Coliseo Carlos Miguel Mangual, Canóvanas
SCORE: D' Aqui - Refuerzos 136–123

Los D' Aqui All Stars: Ramses Melendez, Victor Liz, Ismael Romero, Walter Hodge, Angel Matias (starters); .
Coach:
Reserves: Andre Curbelo (R), Ángel Rodríguez, Christian Lopez, Alex Kappos, Isaac Sosa, Georgie Pacheco, Jezreel De Jesus, Jordan Murphy, Phillip Wheeler, Arnaldo Toro

Los Refuerzos All Stars: Emmanuel Mudiay, Travis Trice, Chris Duarte, Danilo Gallinari, Javale McGee (starters); .
Coach:
Reserves: Gabe York, Ian Clark, Brandon Knight, Louis King, Akil Mitchell, Kobi Simmons, Sam Waardenburg, Demarcus Cousins, Cheick Diallo, Thomas Robinson

- Three-Point Shootout Contest Winner: (Puerto Rico) Tjader Fernandez, Capitanes de Arecibo
- Skill Challenge Winner:
- Slam-Dunk Contest Winner: (United States) Phillip Wheeler, Piratas de Quebradillas, (Puerto Rico) Ramses Meléndez, Capitanes de Arecibo

=== Awards ===
==== Season Awards ====
On July 1, 2025, the league announced the end of season award winners; with Emmanuel Mudiay being named the league's Most Valuable Player.

- Most Valuable Player: (United States) (Democratic Republic of the Congo) Emmanuel Mudiay—Pirates de Quebradillas (23.6 PPG, 5.8 APG, 4.5 RPG)
- Defensive Player of the Year: (United States) Javale McGee—Vacqueros de Bayamon (17.4 PPG, 8.4 RPG, 1.6 BPG)
- Rookie of the Year: (Puerto Rico) André Curbelo—Atletics de San German (12.6 PPG, 5.9 APG, 4.3 RPG)
- Sixth Man of the Year: (Puerto Rico) (United States Virgin Islands) Walter Hodge—Cangrejeros de Santurce (13.3 PPG, 4.8 APG)
- Most Improved Player of the Year: (Puerto Rico) (United States Virgin Islands) Jordan Murphy—Leones de Ponce (16.4 PPG, 7.4 RPG)
- Coach of the Year: (Puerto Rico) Ivan Velez-Indios de Mayaguez
- GM of the Year: (Puerto Rico) Carlos Acosta—Indios de Mayaguez

== Playoffs ==
=== Playoff Bracket ===
All rounds are a best-of-seven series; a series ended when one team won four games, and that team advanced to the next round.

- Updated to match(es) played on August 11, 2025.

Quarterfinals
1A	Vaqueros de Bayamón	4
4A	Gigantes de Carolina	0
2A	Cangrejeros de Santurce	4
3A	Criollos de Caguas	1
1B	Indios de Mayagüez	4
4A	Capitanes de Arecibo	3
2A	Piratas de Quebradillas	2
3B	Leones de Ponce	4

Semifinals
1A	Vaqueros de Bayamón	4
2A	Cangrejeros de Santurce	3
1B	Indios de Mayagüez	2
3B	Leones de Ponce	4

Finals
1A	Vaqueros de Bayamón	4
3B	Leones de Ponce	1

== La Final ==
The 2025 Final (also known as the 2025 La Final Brava for sponsorship reasons) is the championship series of the Baloncesto Superior Nacional (BSN)'s 2025 season and conclusion to the season's playoffs. The final's series was a best-of-seven alternating venues after every game between the final two teams: Vaqueros de Bayamón and Leones de Ponce.

=== Series summary ===
Game	Date	Road team	Result	Home team
Game 1	August 3	Leones de Ponce	76 – 92 (0–1)	Vaqueros de Bayamón
Game 2	August 5	Vaqueros de Bayamón	76 – 90 (1–1)	Leones de Ponce
Game 3	August 7	Leones de Ponce	79 – 100 (1–2)	Vaqueros de Bayamón
Game 4	August 9	Vaqueros de Bayamón	88 – 79 (3–1)	Leones de Ponce
Game 5	August 11	Leones de Ponce	68 – 82 (1–4)	Vaqueros de Bayamón

=== Game summaries ===
Note: Times are EDT (UTC−4) as listed by the BSN.

==== Game 1 ====
YouTube

August 3
8:15 pm GMT

Recap

Leones de Ponce 76, Vaqueros de Bayamón 92
Scoring by quarter: 19–25, 18–12, 14–31, 25–24
Pts: Jezreel De Jesús 24; Rebs: Jared Ruiz 4 Asts: Francis Jonathan Han 4	Pts: JaVale McGee 24; Rebs: JaVale McGee 10; Asts: Gary Browne 5
Bayamón leads series, 1–0

Coliseo Rubén Rodríguez, Bayamón, Puerto Rico
Referees:
- J. Diaz
- J. Carrion
- J. Quinones

==== Game 2 ====
YouTube

August 5
8:15 pm GMT

Recap

Vaqueros de Bayamón 76, Leones de Ponce 90
Scoring by quarter: 26–26, 24–19, 17–24, 9–21
Pts: Danilo Gallinari 22; Rebs: JaVale McGee 10; Asts: Gary Browne 7	Pts: Jezreel De Jesús 23; Rebs: Michael Devoe 9 Asts: Jezreel De Jesús 6
Series tied, 1–1

Auditorio Juan Pachín Vicéns, Ponce, Puerto Rico
Referees:
- R. Vazquez
- G. Shannon
- J. Batista

==== Game 3 ====
YouTube

August 7
8:15 pm GMT

Recap

Leones de Ponce 79, Vaqueros de Bayamón 100
Scoring by quarter: 13–29, 24–18, 22–25, 20–28
Pts: Brady Manek 19; Rebs: Jared Ruiz 5 Asts: Matt Mooney 7	Pts: JaVale McGee 33; Rebs: JaVale McGee 12; Asts: Gary Browne 10
Bayamón leads series, 2–1

Coliseo Rubén Rodríguez, Bayamón, Puerto Rico
Attendance: 10,545
Referees:
- J. Diaz
- J. Carrion
- A. Jordan

==== Game 4 ====
YouTube

August 9
8:15 pm GMT

Recap

Vaqueros de Bayamón 88, Leones de Ponce 79
Scoring by quarter: 15–21, 21–19, 23–20, 29–19
Pts: Danilo Gallinari 21; Rebs: Danilo Gallinari 8 Asts: Gary Browne 9	Pts: Michael Devoe 29; Rebs: Michael Devoe 11; Asts: Matt Mooney 4
Bayamón leads series, 3–1

Auditorio Juan Pachín Vicéns, Ponce, Puerto Rico
Referees:
- J. Batista
- A. Jordan
- G. Shannon

==== Game 5 ====
YouTube

August 11
8:15 pm GMT

Recap

Leones de Ponce 68, Vaqueros de Bayamón 82
Scoring by quarter: 15–22, 19–18, 19–22, 15–20
Pts: Matt Mooney 17; Rebs: Jordan Murphy 5 Asts: Michael Devoe 6	Pts: Danilo Gallinari 22; Rebs: Renaldo Balkman 12; Asts: Gary Browne 8
Bayamón wins series, 4–1

Coliseo Rubén Rodríguez, Bayamón, Puerto Rico
Attendance: 11,500
Referees:
- J. Diaz
- G. Shannon
- A. Jordan
