= Montrezl Harrell =

American basketball player (born 1994)

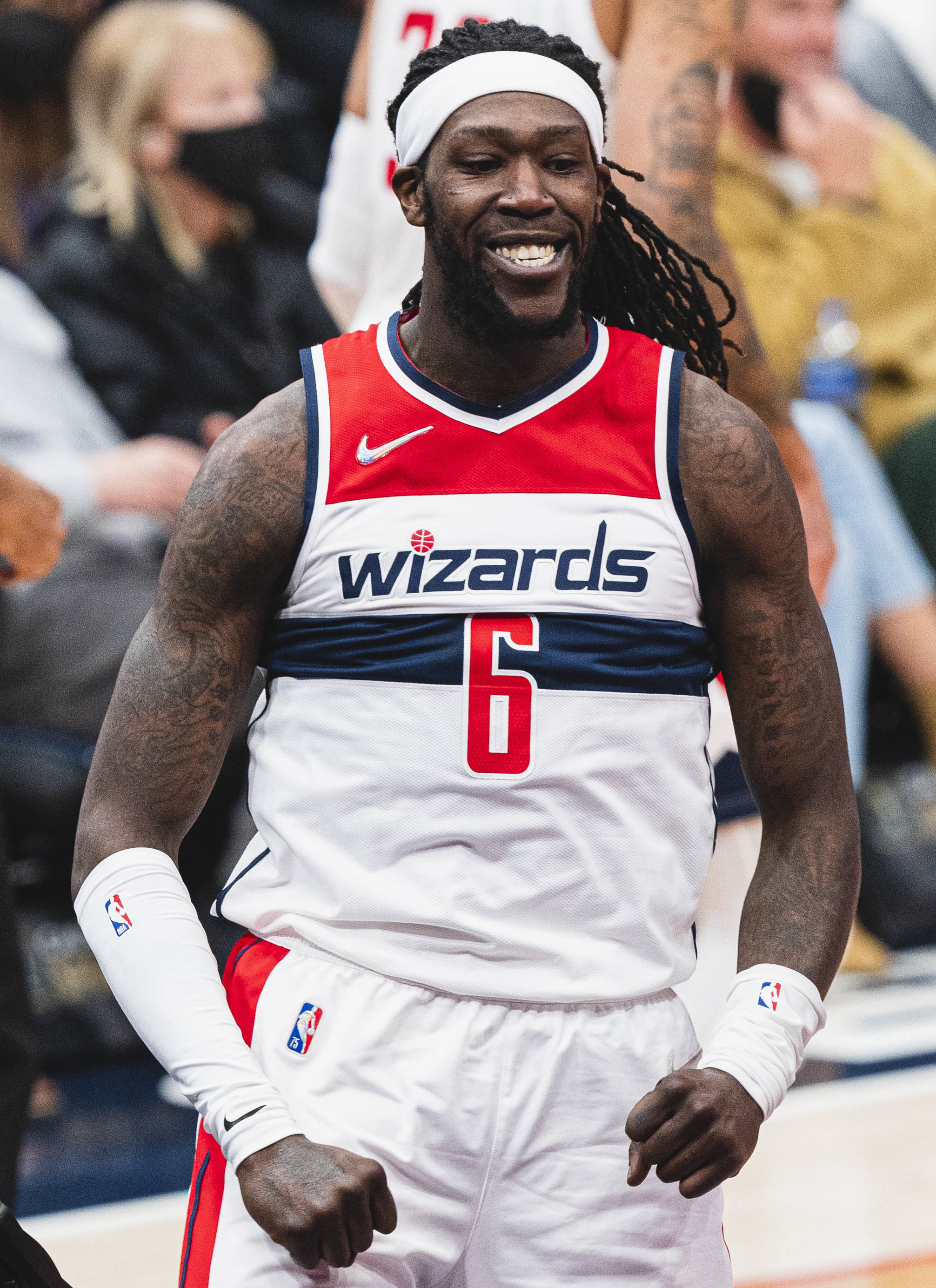
- Harrell with the Washington Wizards in 2022

Free agent
- Position: Center / power forward

Personal information
- Born: January 26, 1994 (age 32) Tarboro, North Carolina, U.S.
- Listed height: 6 ft 7 in (2.01 m)
- Listed weight: 240 lb (109 kg)

Career information
- High school: North Edgecombe (Leggett, North Carolina); Hargrave Military Academy (Chatham, Virginia)
- College: Louisville (2012–2015)
- NBA draft: 2015: 2nd round, 32nd overall pick
- Drafted by: Houston Rockets
- Playing career: 2015–present

Career history
- 2015–2017: Houston Rockets
- 2015–2016: →Rio Grande Valley Vipers
- 2017–2020: Los Angeles Clippers
- 2020–2021: Los Angeles Lakers
- 2021–2022: Washington Wizards
- 2022: Charlotte Hornets
- 2022–2023: Philadelphia 76ers
- 2024–2025: Adelaide 36ers
- 2025: Xinjiang Flying Tigers
- 2025: Gigantes de Carolina
- 2026: Atléticos de San Germán

Career highlights
- NBA Sixth Man of the Year (2020); All-NBL Second Team (2025); NCAA champion (2013)*; Karl Malone Award (2015); First-team All-AAC (2014); Second-team All-ACC (2015); AAC Most Improved Player (2014); *Later vacated
- Stats at NBA.com
- Stats at Basketball Reference
Medals
Men's basketball
Representing the United States
FIBA World U19 Championship
Gold medal – first place	2013 Czech Republic	National team
FIBA Americas U18 Championship
Gold medal – first place	2012 Brazil	National team

Montrezl Dashay Harrell (/ˈmɒntrɛz ˈhærəl/ mon-TREZ HARR-əl; born January 26, 1994) is an American professional basketball player who last played for Atléticos de San Germán of the Baloncesto Superior Nacional (BSN). He played college basketball for the Louisville Cardinals, winning the Karl Malone Award in 2015 as a junior for being the top power forward in the nation. Harrell was selected in the second round of the 2015 NBA draft by the Houston Rockets. He was traded to the Los Angeles Clippers in 2017 where he was awarded as the NBA Sixth Man of the Year in 2020. Harrell spent the following three seasons with the Los Angeles Lakers, Washington Wizards, Charlotte Hornets and Philadelphia 76ers. He missed the entire 2023–24 season after sustaining an anterior cruciate ligament (ACL) injury. Harrell played for the Adelaide 36ers of the Australian National Basketball League (NBL) in 2024–25.

== High school career ==
Harrell, a 6' 7" power forward from Tarboro, North Carolina, starred at North Edgecombe High School before prepping for a year at Hargrave Military Academy in Chatham, Virginia. There he led the team to a 38–1 record while averaging 25.2 points and 13.6 rebounds per game. Originally Harrell committed to play college basketball for coach Seth Greenberg at Virginia Tech, but after Greenberg was fired, Harrell was released from his commitment and chose Louisville.

== College career ==
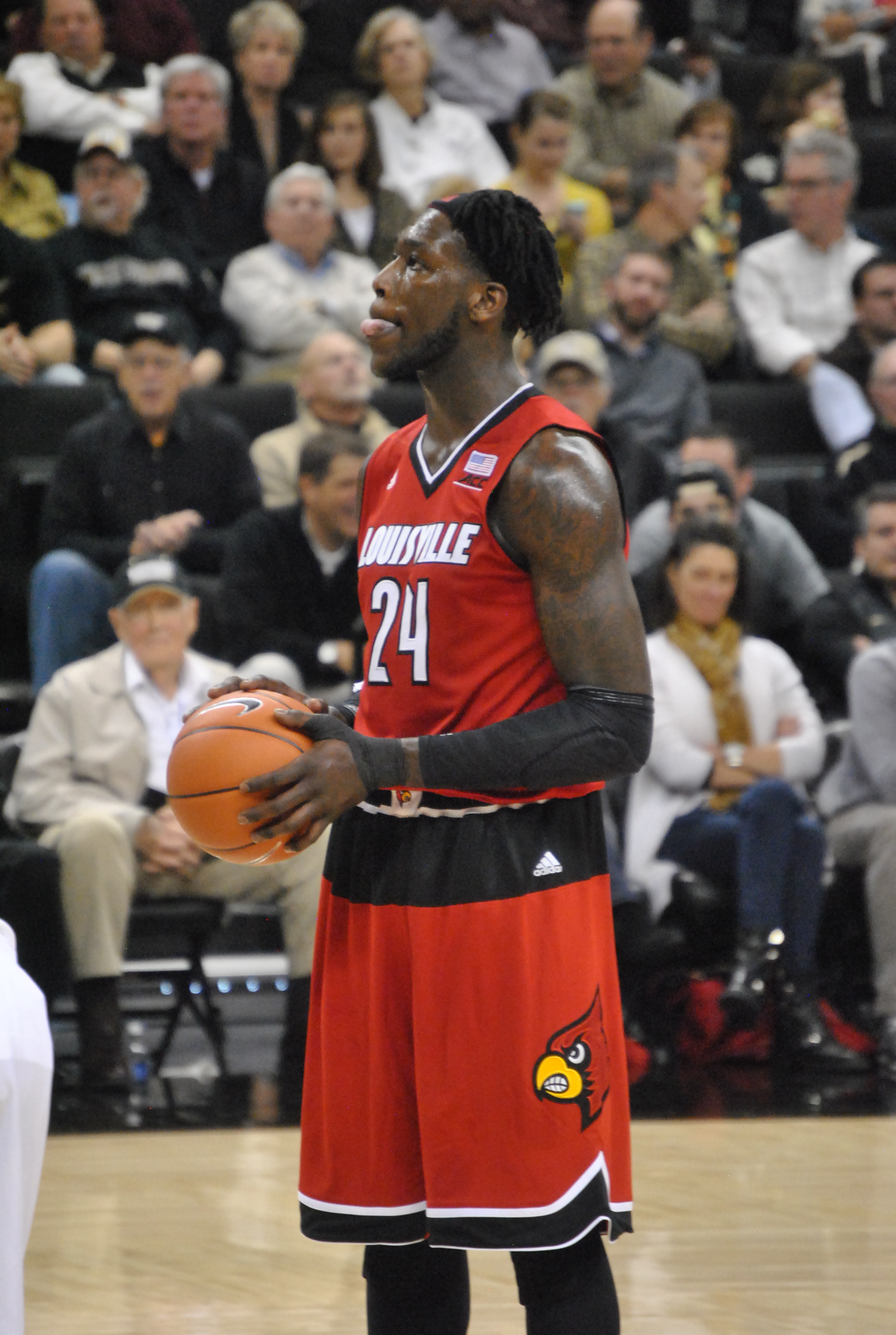
Harrell with Louisville in 2015

As a freshman, Harrell backed up power forward Chane Behanan, averaging 5.7 points and 3.6 rebounds in 16.2 minutes per game. He played his best at the end of the season, scoring 20 points in the Cardinals' Big East Conference championship victory over Syracuse. In his reserve role, Harrell helped the Cardinals win the 2013 NCAA championship, which was later vacated, to cap his freshman season.

With Gorgui Dieng's departure for the 2013 NBA draft, Harrell received recognition in the offseason leading to his sophomore year as one of the top returning players in the country. The Sporting News selected Harrell to the preseason All-America third team in its 2013–14 college basketball preview magazine. He and teammate Russ Smith received postseason honors, being named to the American Athletic Conference's all-conference first team. Harrell was seen as a potential mid-to-late first-round pick in the 2014 NBA draft.

Harrell decided to stay for his junior season instead of opting for the NBA, and the Cardinals moved to the Atlantic Coast Conference (ACC). In the 2014–15 season, he averaged 15.7 points and 9.2 rebounds per game and was the inaugural winner of the Karl Malone Award, given to the nation's top power forward. He was also named second-team All-ACC.

== Professional career ==
=== Houston Rockets (2015–2017) ===
On June 25, 2015, Harrell was selected by the Houston Rockets in the second round of the 2015 NBA draft with the 32nd overall pick. On September 19, 2015, he signed a three-year deal with the Rockets. He made his debut for the Rockets in the team's season opener against the Denver Nuggets on October 28, recording eight points and three rebounds in a 105–85 loss. Two days later, he scored 17 points in a loss to the Golden State Warriors. On November 13, he made his first career start, scoring five points in just under 13 minutes of action, as the Rockets were defeated by the Denver Nuggets 107–98. On March 28, 2016, Harrell received a five-game NBA D-League suspension without pay for pushing a game official. During his rookie season, he received multiple assignments to the Rio Grande Valley Vipers, the Rockets' G-League affiliate.

On November 2, 2016, Harrell had a 17-point, 10-rebound effort off the bench in a 118–99 win over the New York Knicks. On December 21, 2016, against the Phoenix Suns, Harrell made his first start of the season and second of his career. He scored 17 points as a result, tying a career high. On December 30, he set a new career high with 29 points in a 140–116 win over the Los Angeles Clippers. On January 8, 2017, he had 28 points in 26 minutes off the bench on 12-of-13 shooting in a 129–122 win over the Toronto Raptors.

=== Los Angeles Clippers (2017–2020) ===
On June 28, 2017, the Los Angeles Clippers acquired Harrell, Patrick Beverley, Sam Dekker, Darrun Hilliard, DeAndre Liggins, Lou Williams, Kyle Wiltjer, and a 2018 first-round pick from the Houston Rockets in exchange for Chris Paul. On January 11, 2018, he scored a season-high 25 points in a 121–115 win over the Sacramento Kings.

On July 24, 2018, Harrell re-signed with the Clippers on a two-year, $12 million contract. On October 26, 2018, Harrell scored a career-high 30 points off the bench in a 133–113 win over the Houston Rockets. On February 22, 2019, he matched his career high with 30 points in a 112–106 win over the Memphis Grizzlies. Three days later, he set a new career high with 32 points in a 121–112 win over the Dallas Mavericks.

On November 6, 2019, Harrell set a new career high of 34 points, alongside 13 rebounds and five assists, in a 129–124 loss to the Milwaukee Bucks. On November 24, he again scored 34 points, alongside twelve rebounds, two assists and two blocks, in a 134–109 win over the New Orleans Pelicans. On January 5, 2020, Harrell scored 34 points, alongside six rebounds and three assists, in a 135–132 win over the New York Knicks. During the 2019–20 season, Harrell averaged career highs in points (18.6) and rebounds (7.1) per game. He was named the NBA Sixth Man of the Year, and was awarded the NBA Hustle Award. The Clippers fell in seven games during the second round of the playoffs after the Denver Nuggets came back from a 3–1 deficit, despite a team-leading 20-point effort from Harrell in Game 7. Harrell averaged 10.5 points and 2.9 rebounds in the playoffs.

=== Los Angeles Lakers (2020–2021) ===
On November 22, 2020, Harrell signed a two-year, $19 million contract with the Los Angeles Lakers. On December 22, he made his Lakers debut, putting up 17 points, 10 rebounds, and three assists, in a 116–109 loss to the Los Angeles Clippers. On March 15, 2021, Harrell scored a season-high 27 points, alongside five rebounds and three steals, in a 128–97 win over the Golden State Warriors. In the first round of the playoffs, the Lakers fell in six games to the Phoenix Suns, with Harrell only averaging 9.8 minutes a game.

=== Washington Wizards (2021–2022) ===
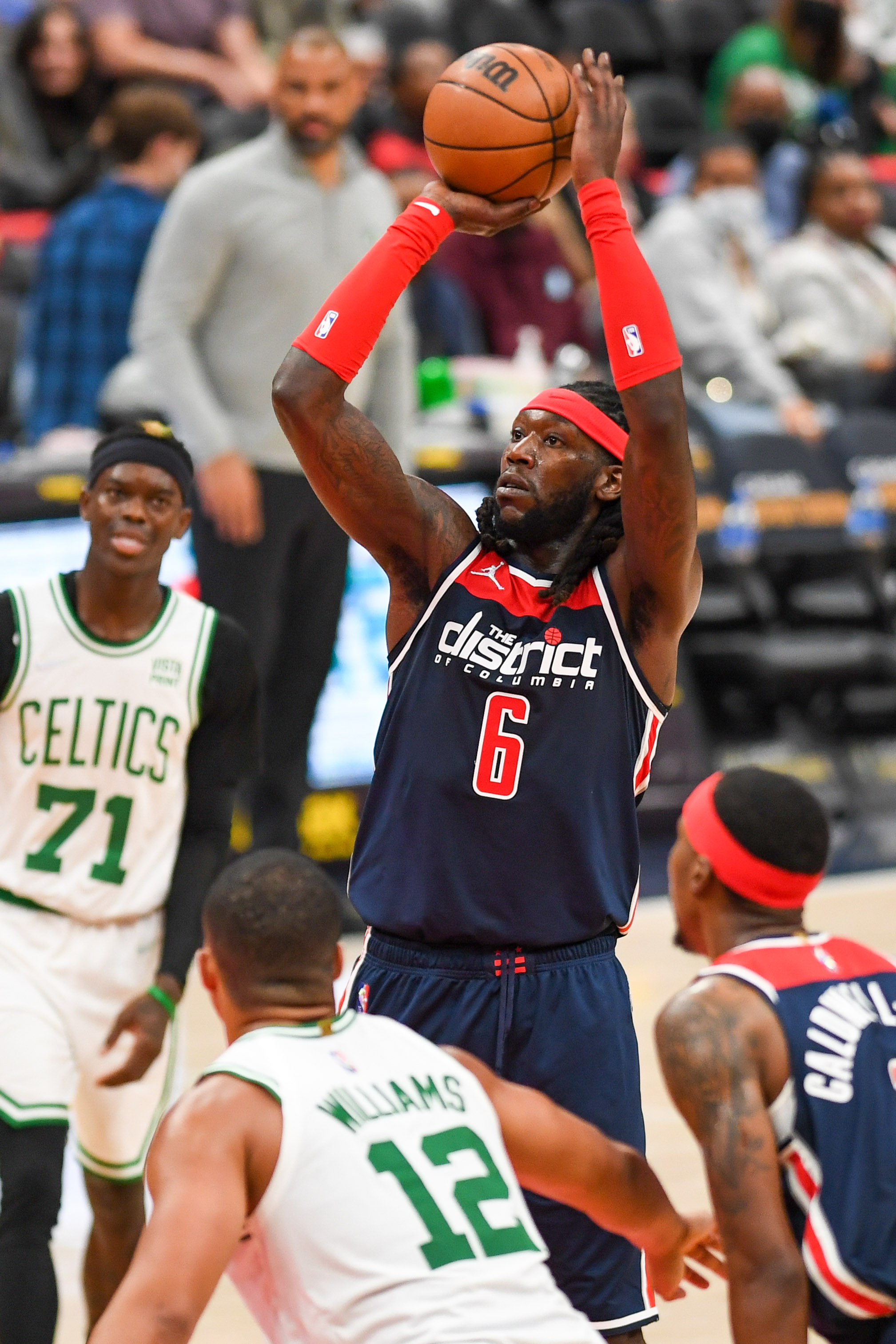
Harrell shoots a free throw during a 2021 game

On August 6, 2021, Harrell was traded to the Washington Wizards as part of a package for Russell Westbrook. Harrell made his Wizards debut on October 20, recording 22 points and nine rebounds in a 98–83 win over the Toronto Raptors. On December 1, he scored a season-high 27 points, alongside five rebounds and three assists, in a 115–107 win over the Minnesota Timberwolves.

=== Charlotte Hornets (2022) ===
On February 10, 2022, Harrell was traded to his hometown team the Charlotte Hornets in exchange for Ish Smith, Vernon Carey Jr., and a 2023 second-round pick. On February 11, Harrell made his Hornets debut, putting up 15 points and six rebounds in a 141–119 win over the Detroit Pistons.

=== Philadelphia 76ers (2022–2023) ===
On September 13, 2022, Harrell signed a 2-year deal with the Philadelphia 76ers. He made his 76ers debut on October 18, scoring two points in a 126–117 loss to the Boston Celtics.

On June 21, 2023, Harrell declined his $1.97 million player option to become a free agent and on July 18, he signed with the 76ers on a 1-year deal. However, on August 2, he suffered an anterior cruciate ligament (ACL) injury while preparing for the training camp and was waived on October 23. He subsequently missed the entire 2023–24 NBA season and participated in NBA minicamps ahead of the 2024–25 season.

=== Adelaide 36ers and Xinjiang Flying Tigers (2024–2025) ===
On September 12, 2024, Harrell signed with the Adelaide 36ers of the National Basketball League (NBL) in Australia as an injury replacement player for Jarell Martin. In his debut for the 36ers on September 22, he recorded 13 points and 13 rebounds in a 102–94 loss to the Sydney Kings. On October 18, he signed with the 36ers for the rest of the 2024–25 season. On October 25, he had 36 points, 16 rebounds and five blocks in a 99–93 overtime win over the Cairns Taipans. On November 25, he was suspended for three games and received fines totalling $3,685 following striking and melee incidents that occurred during Adelaide's game against Melbourne United on November 17. He went on to earn All-NBL Second Team honors. In 28 games, he averaged 20.5 points, 9.3 rebounds, 2.0 assists and 1.1 blocks per game.

In early February 2025, Harrell reportedly signed with the Zhejiang Golden Bulls of the Chinese Basketball Association. After not joining the team before the scheduled date of February 22, he signed with the Xinjiang Flying Tigers on March 13, replacing Rob Edwards. In 13 games for Xinjiang to finish the 2024–25 season, he averaged 11.9 points, 4.4 rebounds and 1.8 assists per game. On June 25, the China Anti-Doping Agency announced that a test Harrell performed on April 15 showed positive for carboxy THC.

On May 28, 2025, Harrell re-signed with the Adelaide 36ers for the 2025–26 NBL season. However, he was released from his contract by the 36ers on September 25, 2025, after Harrell was found to have used tetrahydrocannabinolic acid while playing in China in April 2025.

=== Gigantes de Carolina (2025) ===
On May 15, 2025, Harrell signed with Gigantes de Carolina of the Baloncesto Superior Nacional (BSN) for the rest of the 2025 season. In eight games, he averaged 14.3 points, 6.0 rebounds and 1.4 assists per game.

=== Atléticos de San Germán (2026) ===
On January 2, 2026, Harrell signed with Atléticos de San Germán for the 2026 BSN season. He participated in the 2026 BSN All-Star Game as a starter. In a June 2026 game against Capitanes de Arecibo, he recorded 32 points and 14 rebounds and had the game-winning basket.

On July 9, 2026, Harrell was suspended by the BSN until January 2027 due to a failed drug testing process stretching back to his time with the Adelaide 36ers. He was subsequently released by Atléticos de San Germán ahead of the Puerto Rican playoffs. The suspension stemmed from Harrell's failure to complete an out-of-competition drug test while playing for the 36ers on January 29, 2025. While Harrell did not test positive for any performance-enhancing substances, the failure to complete the testing process resulted in a sanction.

== National team career ==
In 2012, Harrell was a member of the United States team at the FIBA Americas Under-18 Championship that won Gold in São Sebastião do Paraíso, Brazil.

== NBA career statistics ==
Legend
GP	Games played	GS	Games started	MPG	Minutes per game
FG%	Field goal percentage	3P%	3-point field goal percentage	FT%	Free throw percentage
RPG	Rebounds per game	APG	Assists per game	SPG	Steals per game
BPG	Blocks per game	PPG	Points per game	**Bold**	Career high
*	Led the league

=== Regular season ===
Year	Team	GP	GS	MPG	FG%	3P%	FT%	RPG	APG	SPG	BPG	PPG
2015–16	Houston	39	1	9.7	.644	–	.522	1.7	.4	.3	.3	3.6
2016–17	Houston	58	**14**	18.3	**.652**	.143	.628	3.8	1.1	.3	.7	9.1
2017–18	L.A. Clippers	76	3	17.0	.635	.143	.626	4.0	1.0	.5	.7	11.0
2018–19	L.A. Clippers	**82***	5	26.3	.615	.176	.643	6.5	2.0	**.9**	**1.3**	16.6
2019–20	L.A. Clippers	63	2	**27.8**	.580	.000	.658	**7.1**	1.7	.6	1.1	**18.6**
2020–21	L.A. Lakers	69	1	22.9	.622	.000	.707	6.2	1.1	.7	.7	13.5
2021–22	Washington	46	3	24.3	.645	**.267**	**.727**	6.7	**2.1**	.4	.7	14.1
2021–22	Charlotte	25	0	21.0	.645	.000	.692	4.9	2.0	.4	.5	11.4
2022–23	Philadelphia	57	7	11.9	.598	.000	.693	2.8	.6	.3	.4	5.6
Career		515	36	20.5	.619	.108	.664	5.0	1.3	.5	.8	12.1

=== Playoffs ===
Year	Team	GP	GS	MPG	FG%	3P%	FT%	RPG	APG	SPG	BPG	PPG
2016	Houston	2	0	6.0	.333	.000	.500	1.0	.0	.0	.0	1.5
2017	Houston	5	0	4.2	.333	–	.500	1.2	.4	.0	.0	1.0
2019	L.A. Clippers	6	0	**26.3**	**.730**	.000	.692	**5.5**	**2.2**	**.5**	**.7**	**18.3**
2020	L.A. Clippers	**13**	0	18.7	.573	**.200**	.603	2.9	.4	.4	.5	10.5
2021	L.A. Lakers	4	0	9.8	.571	–	**.778**	3.0	.0	**.5**	.0	5.8
2023	Philadelphia	2	0	3.5	.000	–	–	.5	.0	.0	.0	.0
Career		32	0	15.0	.613	.143	.631	2.8	.6	.3	.3	8.7

== Personal life ==
Harrell is the son of Samuel and Selena Harrell and has two younger brothers, Cadarius and Quatavius. His father added the silent "l" to his first name because he wanted to make it unique.

Harrell has two children who live with their mother in Kentucky.

Harrell is good friends with football player Todd Gurley who also attended high school in Tarboro.

Harrell enjoys collecting and designing sneakers. Through social media, he finds and works with sneaker customizers to realize his design ideas. Since the NBA relaxed its policies in 2018, Harrell wore different shoes during the first and second half of every basketball game.

Harrell left the 2020 NBA Bubble in Walt Disney World for a family matter, which was later revealed to be to tend to his grandmother, who died soon after. He missed the first two games in the bubble as a result.

On June 15, 2022, Harrell was charged with trafficking less than 5 pounds (2.3 kg) of marijuana, a felony drug charge punishable with up to five years in prison. In August 2022, the crime was downgraded to a misdemeanor.

== See also ==
- List of NBA career field goal percentage leaders
