= André Curbelo =

Puerto Rican basketball player

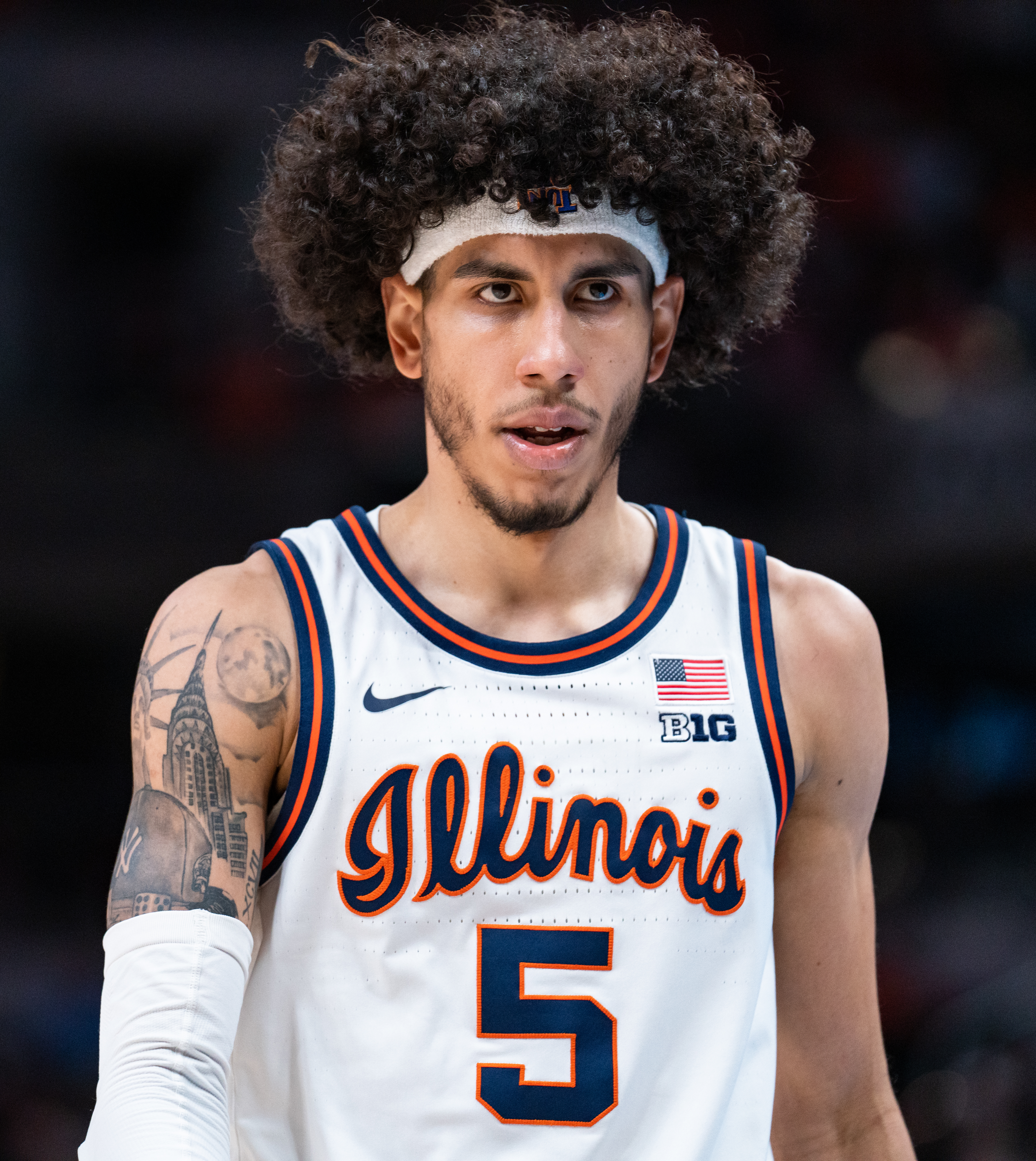
- Curbelo with Illinois in 2022

Panteras de Aguascalientes
- Position: Point guard
- League: LNBP

Personal information
- Born: October 13, 2001 (age 25) San Juan, Puerto Rico
- Listed height: 6 ft 1 in (1.85 m)
- Listed weight: 175 lb (79 kg)

Career information
- High school: Long Island Lutheran (Brookville, New York)
- College: Illinois (2020–2022); St. John's (2022–2023); Southern Miss (2023–2025)
- NBA draft: 2025: undrafted
- Playing career: 2025–present

Career history
- 2025–2026: Atléticos de San Germán
- 2026–present: Panteras de Aguascalientes

Career highlights
- BSN Rookie of the Year (2025); BSN Most Improved Player (2026); 2x BSN All Star (2025, 2026); Big Ten Sixth Man of the Year (2021); Big Ten All-Freshman Team (2021); Nike Hoop Summit (2019)
Medals
Men's basketball
Representing Puerto Rico
FIBA Under-17 World Cup
Bronze medal – third place	2018 Argentina
FIBA Americas Under-16 Championship
Bronze medal – third place	2017 Argentina
Centrobasket Under-15 Championship
Gold medal – first place	2016 Puerto Rico
Central American and Caribbean Games
Bronze medal – third place	2023 San Salvador	Team

André Jael Curbelo Rodríguez (born October 13, 2001) is a Puerto Rican professional basketball player for Panteras de Aguascalientes of the Liga Nacional de Baloncesto Profesional (LNBP) in Mexico. He previously played college basketball for the Southern Miss Golden Eagles, the Illinois Fighting Illini and St. John's Red Storm. Curbelo represents the Puerto Rican national team in international tournaments. Listed at 6 feet 1 inch (1.85 m) and 175 pounds (79 kg), he plays the point guard position.

== High school career ==
Curbelo grew up in Vega Baja, Puerto Rico and started playing basketball at age four. He moved to the New York area when he was 13 years old. Curbelo decided to attend Long Island Lutheran Middle and High School in Brookville, New York after being suggested by a family friend. He spoke little English and struggled academically as a freshman, before gradually adjusting and improving his grades. In his junior season, Curbelo averaged 15.5 points, eight rebounds, nine assists and four steals per game and was named Newsday All-Long Island Player of the Year. He led Long Island Lutheran to the Class AA title at the New York State Federation Tournament of Champions in 2019, his school's first-ever Class AA Federation championship after their seven previous Federation championships in classes A, B and C. In April 2019, Curbelo played for the World Select Team at the Nike Hoop Summit in Portland, Oregon.

=== Recruiting ===
Curbelo was considered a four-star recruit, according to major recruiting services. On November 1, 2019, he committed to playing college basketball for Illinois over offers from Oregon, Florida, Kansas and Louisville, among others. Curbelo was recruited to Illinois by assistant coach Orlando Antigua.

College recruiting
Name	Hometown	School	Height	Weight	Commit date
André Curbelo; PG	Vega Baja, Puerto Rico	Long Island Lutheran (NY)	6 ft 1 in (1.85 m)	175 lb (79 kg)	Nov 1, 2019
André Curbelo; PG	Recruit ratings: Rivals: 247Sports: ESPN: (87)				
Overall recruit ranking: Rivals: 38 247Sports: 58 ESPN: 44
Note: In many cases, Scout, Rivals, 247Sports, On3, and ESPN may conflict in their listings of height and weight.; In these cases, the average was taken. ESPN grades are on a 100-point scale.; Sources: "Illinois 2020 Basketball Commitments". Rivals.; "2020 Illinois Fighting Illini Recruiting Class". ESPN.; "2020 Team Ranking". Rivals.

== College career ==
=== Illinois (2020–2022) ===
==== 2020–21 season ====
Curbelo joined the Illinois basketball team as a freshman during the 2020–21 season. He debuted against North Carolina A&T, playing 19 minutes off the bench and tallying 8 points and 6 assists while Illinois won 122–60. Against Chicago State, Curbelo scored a career-high 18 points while securing 7 rebounds in the Illini's 97–38 win. During a Big Ten regular season matchup against Nebraska, Curbelo registered a 10-point, 12-rebound double-double, the first of his career. In their final regular season game against Ohio State, Curbelo played 29 minutes and set a new career-high with 19 points.

Curbelo was a significant piece off the bench during the 2021 Big Ten tournament championship run, averaging 26 minutes, 11.7 points, and 5 rebounds. In their final two games during the NCAA tournament, Curbelo averaged 8.5 points and 6 assists. During his freshman season, Curbelo averaged 9.1 points, 4.2 assists, and 4 rebounds per game. He was named to the Big Ten All-Freshman Team and was awarded the Big Ten Sixth Man of the Year Award.

==== 2021–22 season ====
Curbelo missed his sophomore season opener against Jackson State due to a concussion. Against Kansas State, Curbelo played limited minutes and then missed several games due to continued head trauma. Curbelo played 19 games during the season averaging 19.3 minutes and 7.5 points per game. On March 28, 2022, he announced that he had decided to leave Illinois and enter his name into the NCAA transfer portal.

=== St. John's (2022–2023) ===
On April 15, 2022, Curbelo announced that he had committed to St. John's.

=== Southern Miss (2023–2025) ===
After a lackluster season at St. John's, Curbelo transferred again, this time to Southern Miss. Because this was his second transfer and without a degree, Curbelo was unable to play until the NCAA approved his eligibility waiver. This became a moot point, however, when the NCAA's transfer rule was suspended for the 23–24 season, allowing Curbelo to play. He was dismissed from the Golden Eagles on February 22, 2025.

=== NBA Draft Eligibility (2025) ===
Curbelo was automatically entered into the 2025 NBA Draft because he had exhausted all of his NCAA eligibility at Southern Miss. Under NBA rules, players who have no remaining college eligibility become automatically eligible for the draft and do not need to formally declare. Since no team selected Curbelo in the 2025 NBA Draft, he became an undrafted free agent and is no longer eligible to be drafted in a future NBA Draft, but may be signed by any team as he is an unrestricted free agent.

== National team career ==
In 2016, Curbelo won a gold medal with Puerto Rico at the Centrobasket Under-15 Championship in Patillas, Puerto Rico after averaging 16.5 points, seven rebounds and 6.5 assists per game. At the 2017 FIBA Under-16 Americas Championship in Formosa, Argentina, he averaged a tournament-leading 21.8 points, seven rebounds, 3.2 assists and 3.5 steals per game and won a bronze medal. Curbelo competed at the 2018 FIBA Under-17 World Cup in Argentina, where he averaged 13.6 points, 5.6 rebounds and a tournament-high 5.9 assists per game and led his team to another bronze medal. He averaged 11.1 points and 5.6 assists per game at the 2019 FIBA Under-19 World Cup in Heraklion, Greece as Puerto Rico finished in sixth place. Curbelo won a bronze medal with his national team at the 2023 Central American and Caribbean Games held in San Salvador, El Salvador.

== Career statistics ==
Legend
GP	Games played	GS	Games started	MPG	Minutes per game
FG%	Field goal percentage	3P%	3-point field goal percentage	FT%	Free throw percentage
RPG	Rebounds per game	APG	Assists per game	SPG	Steals per game
BPG	Blocks per game	PPG	Points per game	**Bold**	Career high

=== College ===
Year	Team	GP	GS	MPG	FG%	3P%	FT%	RPG	APG	SPG	BPG	PPG
2020–21	Illinois	**31**	0	21.5	**.498**	.161	.728	4.0	4.2	.9	.1	9.1
2021–22	Illinois	19	4	19.3	.329	.176	.745	3.1	3.2	.7	.1	7.5
2022–23	St. John's	26	**16**	**27.3**	.424	.294	.705	2.8	4.3	**2.0**	.2	9.6
2023–24	Southern Miss	12	9	27.0	.455	.250	.667	**4.3**	3.8	1.6	.0	**13.6**
2024–25	Southern Miss	20	11	24.3	.421	**.357**	**.756**	3.6	**4.7**	1.9	**.3**	9.8
Career		108	40	23.7	.430	.245	.719	3.5	4.1	1.4	.1	9.5

== Professional Career ==
=== Atléticos de San Germán (2025) ===
On January 29, 2025, Curbelo was drafted 5th overall in the Baloncesto Superior Nacional by the Piratas de Quebradillas. That pick would later be sent to the Atléticos de San Germán. Curbelo won the BSN Rookie of the year that season. He averaged 12.6 points, 5.9 assists, 4.3 rebounds, and 1.4 steals over 34 games.

=== Second Stint with the Atléticos de San Germán (2026) ===
He returned to the team for the 2026 season. On April 1, 2026, he had a season high 39 points against the Mets de Guaynabo. On May 15, 2026, Curbelo was selected as a starter for the 2026 BSN All-Star Game alongside teammates Montrezl Harrell and Nick Perkins. On May 22, 2026, Curbelo had his first triple-double of the season, scoring 19 points, 11 rebounds, and 10 assists against the Leones de Ponce. On June 6, 2026, Curbelo had yet again another triple-double, scoring 27 points, 10 rebounds, & 10 assists in a very close win 103-99 against the Capitanes de Arecibo. After the end of the regular season, Curbelo won the 2026 BSN Most Improved Player award and was the runner up for the BSN Most Valuable Player to Travis Trice.

== Personal life ==
Curbelo's father, Joel, played professional basketball for 18 years and represented Puerto Rico at the 1996 Summer Olympics. His mother, Joann Rodríguez, played for the Puerto Rico women's national handball team. Curbelo's aunt played basketball for the Puerto Rico women's national team.
