= Joél Curbelo =

Puerto Rican basketball player (born 1974)

Personal information
- Nationality: Puerto Rican
- Born: 4 July 1974 (age 51) Río Piedras, Puerto Rico

Sport
- Sport: Basketball

Joél Curbelo (born 4 July 1974) is a Puerto Rican basketball player. He competed in the men's tournament at the 1996 Summer Olympics. His son, Andre Curbelo is a former basketball player for the St. John's Red Storm.
