= Sam Waardenburg =

New Zealand basketball player (born 1999)

No. 21 – Melbourne United
- Position: Power forward
- League: NBL

Personal information
- Born: 21 February 1999 (age 27) Auckland, New Zealand
- Listed height: 208 cm (6 ft 10 in)
- Listed weight: 100 kg (220 lb)

Career information
- High school: Rangitoto College (Auckland, New Zealand)
- College: Miami (Florida) (2017–2022)
- NBA draft: 2022: undrafted
- Playing career: 2016–present

Career history
- 2016: Super City Rangers
- 2022–2026: Cairns Taipans
- 2023: Riesen Ludwigsburg
- 2025–2026: Indios de Mayagüez
- 2026–present: Melbourne United

Career highlights
- NBL Next Generation Award (2023)

Samuel Douglas Waardenburg (born 21 February 1999) is a New Zealand professional basketball player for Melbourne United of the National Basketball League (NBL). He played college basketball for the Miami Hurricanes.

== Early life and career ==
Waardenburg was born in Auckland, New Zealand, in the suburb of Henderson. He attended Rangitoto College in Auckland.

Early in 2016, Waardenburg played four games for the Super City Rangers in the New Zealand National Basketball League. In June, he attended the Nike All Asia Camp in Beijing, where he was named the event's Most Outstanding Player. He was selected for the National Basketball Players Association Top 100 Camp in the United States and participated in the Basketball Without Borders Camp in Australia, earning the MVP award. In July, he competed in the Adidas Nations Tournament in Los Angeles, where he was ranked in the top 10 players of the camp.

In August 2016, Waardenburg joined the New Zealand Breakers of the Australian National Basketball League (NBL) as a development player, signing a non-paid contract to maintain his amateur status. In September, he committed to a basketball scholarship with the University of Miami. In October, he won tournament MVP honours when he helped Rangitoto win the SAS Secondary Schools National Championship, tallying 18 points, eight rebounds and four blocks in the final game.

== College career ==
Waardenburg joined the Miami Hurricanes of the NCAA Division I in January 2017 for the second semester of the 2016–17 season, but did not compete and redshirted.

As a redshirt freshman in 2017–18, Waardenburg played in 21 games off bench, averaging 3.3 points and 2.8 rebounds in 14.8 minutes per game. He scored a season-high 12 points in win over Wake Forest on 7 February 2018.

In 2018–19, Waardenburg played in all 32 games and made 11 starts, averaging 5.3 points, 3.5 rebounds and 1.2 assists in 24.9 minutes per game. He scored season-high 14 points in 37 minutes against Penn on 4 December 2018.

In 2019–20, Waardenburg played in 30 of 31 games, missing one due to injury, and earned 24 starts, including in each of the first 23 contests. He averaged 5.9 points, a team-high 6.0 rebounds and a team-best 1.1 blocks in 28.3 minutes per game. He had two 15-point games during the season.

In October 2020, Waardenburg sustained a left foot injury in practice and was subsequently ruled out for the entire 2020–21 season. Despite being a redshirt senior, Waardenburg retained another year of eligibility because of the NCAA's ruling that allowed all winter sport athletes an extra year of eligibility due to the COVID-19 pandemic.

Waardenburg returned to the Hurricanes for the 2021–22 season. He entered the season as the team's starting center, a position that he only sparingly played in his first three seasons. His 3-point shooting was also praised in the preseason. He appeared in 35 of 37 games, missing two due to COVID-19 protocols, and started 34 times. He averaged 8.5 points, 4.3 rebounds, 2.1 assists and 1.3 blocks in 30.2 minutes per game. He scored a career-high 21 points against North Carolina on 18 January 2022. He helped Miami reach its first Sweet 16 in six years. He finished his career No. 12 on Miami's blocked shots list (100).

== Professional career ==
After going undrafted in the 2022 NBA draft, Waardenburg joined the Dallas Mavericks for the 2022 NBA Summer League, but did not play due to an ankle injury.

On 9 June 2022, Waardenburg signed a two-year deal with the Cairns Taipans of the Australian NBL. He was named the recipient of the NBL Next Generation Award for the 2022–23 season after averaging 10.8 points, shooting at 53.6 per cent from the field to go with 5.0 rebounds and 1.2 assists in 25 games. Following the NBL season, he moved to Germany to play for Riesen Ludwigsburg, where he averaged 5.4 points and 2.4 rebounds in 20 games to finish the 2022–23 Basketball Bundesliga.

After a minor stint with the Minnesota Timberwolves during the 2023 NBA Summer League, Waardenburg re-joined the Taipans for the 2023–24 NBL season. He saw a decline in averages in his second season as he struggled with injury and missed five games. He averaged 9.7 points, 5.2 rebounds and 1.8 assists per game. He had a career-high 14 rebounds against the South East Melbourne Phoenix in October 2023.

In April 2024, Waardenburg re-signed with the Taipans for the 2024–25 NBL season. On 25 January 2025, he had 24 points, nine rebounds and nine assists in a 125–116 double-overtime win over the Perth Wildcats. He was named the Taipans' Club MVP after averaging 14.5 points, 6.4 rebounds, 3.4 assists, 1.0 blocks and 0.8 steals per game.

Waardenburg joined Indios de Mayagüez of the Baloncesto Superior Nacional (BSN) for the 2025 season. He averaged 17.2 points, 7.6 rebounds and 2.4 assists on 53.8 per cent from the field and 36.6 per cent from three.

On 29 March 2025, Waardenburg re-signed with the Taipans for the 2025–26 NBL season. On 16 September 2025, he was ruled out until December 2025 following ankle surgery. A further ankle injury in January 2026 ruled him out for an additional six weeks. He appeared in just eight games for the season.

Waardenburg re-joined Indios de Mayagüez for the 2026 BSN season.

On 20 April 2026, Waardenburg signed a three-year deal with Melbourne United.

== National team career ==
Waardenburg played for the New Zealand Junior Tall Blacks at the 2015 FIBA Under-16 Oceania Championship, 2016 FIBA Oceania Under-18 Championship, and 2017 FIBA Under-19 Basketball World Cup. He was named to the All-Star Five at the 2016 FIBA Oceania Under-18 Championship. In June 2016, he represented the New Zealand 3x3 team at the FIBA 3x3 Under-18 World Championships in Kazakhstan.

Waardenburg debuted for the New Zealand Tall Blacks during the 2023 FIBA Basketball World Cup qualifiers. He played for them again during the 2025 FIBA Asia Cup qualifiers.

In June 2026, Waardenburg was named in the Tall Blacks squad for the third window of the FIBA Basketball World Cup 2027 Asian Qualifiers. In August 2026, he was named in the Tall Blacks squad for the next Asian qualifier window. In November 2026, he was named in the squad for two more Asian qualifiers.
