= Tyrell Harrison =

Basketball player (born 1999)

No. 24 – Brisbane Bullets
- Position: Center
- League: NBL

Personal information
- Born: 6 July 1999 (age 27) Brisbane, Queensland, Australia
- Listed height: 214 cm (7 ft 0 in)
- Listed weight: 115 kg (254 lb)

Career information
- High school: John Paul College (Brisbane, Queensland)
- NBA draft: 2021: undrafted
- Playing career: 2017–present

Career history
- 2017–2018: South West Metro Pirates
- 2017–present: Brisbane Bullets
- 2019: Nelson Giants
- 2020: Southern Districts Spartans
- 2023: Franklin Bulls
- 2024: Manawatu Jets
- 2024: Southern Districts Spartans
- 2025–2026: Indios de Mayagüez
- 2026: Sagesse SC

Career highlights
- NBL Most Improved Player (2025); NBL1 North First Team (2024); NZNBL Youth Player of the Year (2019)

Tyrell Harrison (born 6 July 1999) is an Australian-New Zealand professional basketball player for the Brisbane Bullets of the National Basketball League (NBL). Born in Brisbane, he represents New Zealand in international basketball competitions.

== Early life ==
Harrison was born in Brisbane, Queensland, to a father from New Zealand. Growing up in Regents Park, his father ensured Māori culture was prevalent for Harrison and his older brother as youths. Harrison loved rugby union and supported the All Blacks.

Harrison played basketball at the Logan Metro Indoor Sports Centre and attended John Paul College in Brisbane.

== Professional career ==
=== Brisbane Bullets ===
Harrison joined the Brisbane Bullets of the National Basketball League (NBL) as a development player for the 2017–18 season. He made his NBL debut in September 2017. In his first three NBL seasons, he appeared in just 17 games.

In the 2020–21 NBL season, Harrison appeared in all 36 games for the Bullets, averaging 5.2 points and 5.8 rebounds per game. In the 2021–22 NBL season, Harrison increased his minutes and on-court production, but ultimately succumbed to an elbow injury late in the season. He averaged 6.2 points, 5.7 rebounds, and 1.2 blocks in 17 games.

In the 2022 off-season, Harrison underwent elbow surgery after battling through pain over the previous two seasons that had been caused by a stress fracture.

In the 2022–23 NBL season, Harrison averaged 5.0 points and 4.4 rebounds in 16 games while shooting 82% from the field. He was ruled out for six weeks in late November 2022 with a knee injury.

On 6 March 2023, Harrison re-signed with the Bullets on a two-year deal. He participated in all but one game in the 2023–24 NBL season, averaging 9.6 points, 6.2 rebounds, and 1.4 blocks, establishing himself as the starting center.

On 29 September 2024, Harrison signed a two-year contract extension with the Bullets. Coming into the 2024–25 NBL season, Harrison was named the most valuable player of the NBL Blitz pre-season tournament. On 12 October 2024, he recorded 21 points and 17 rebounds (12 offensive) in an 87–85 win over the South East Melbourne Phoenix. His 12 offensive rebounds set the record for the most ever by a player in a 40-minute NBL game. On 6 December, he recorded 19 points and 18 rebounds in a 102–83 win over the Adelaide 36ers. He suffered a head knock in early January 2025 and missed the rest of the season with post-concussion symptoms. He was named the NBL Most Improved Player for the 2024–25 season.

On 19 September 2025, Harrison had 24 points and 15 rebounds in the Bullets' season-opening 104–95 win over the New Zealand Breakers. On 15 October, he recorded 27 points and 15 rebounds in a 110–93 win over the Perth Wildcats. He was sidelined between round 15 and round 21 due to a concussion.

=== QBL/NBL1 North, New Zealand NBL, Puerto Rico, and Lebanon ===
In 2017, Harrison debuted in the Queensland Basketball League (QBL) for the South West Metro Pirates. He continued with the Pirates in the 2018 QBL season.

Harrison joined the Nelson Giants of the New Zealand NBL for the 2019 season, where he averaged 13.1 points, 6.2 rebounds, 1.2 steals and 1.2 blocks in 18 games. He was subsequently named the NZNBL Youth Player of the Year.

In 2020, Harrison played for the Southern Districts Spartans in the Queensland State League (QSL).

Harrison joined the Franklin Bulls for the 2023 New Zealand NBL season but injury restricted him to just seven games while averaging 14.7 points and 8.6 rebounds per game.

Harrison began the 2024 New Zealand NBL season with the Manawatu Jets before joining the Southern Districts Spartans of the NBL1 North for the rest of the 2024 NBL1 season. With the Spartans, he averaged 23.6 points, 12.1 rebounds, and 2.4 blocks per game, earning selection to the NBL1 North First Team.

In March 2025, Harrison joined Indios de Mayagüez of the Baloncesto Superior Nacional (BSN) for the 2025 season.

In July 2025, Harrison joined the Denver Nuggets for the 2025 NBA Summer League.

Harrison re-joined Indios de Mayagüez for the 2026 BSN season. Following the BSN season, he joined Sagesse SC of the Lebanese Basketball League on July 6, 2026. He helped Sagesse reach the Finals, averaging 13.9 points and 9.4 rebounds per game across the seven-game series loss.

== National team career ==
In 2017, Harrison played for the Australian University National Team at the World University Games in Taiwan.

After high school, Harrison switched allegiances to play for the New Zealand Tall Blacks. He played for the Tall Blacks during 2019 FIBA World Cup Asian qualifiers, 2022 FIBA Asia Cup qualifiers, 2023 FIBA World Cup Asian qualifiers, 2025 FIBA Asia Cup qualifiers, and at the 2024 FIBA Men's Olympic Qualifying Tournament in Greece.

In November 2025, Harrison was named in the Tall Blacks squad for the first window of the FIBA Basketball World Cup 2027 Asian Qualifiers. In February 2026, he was named in the squad for two more Asian qualifiers. In November 2026, he was named in the squad for two more Asian qualifiers.

== NBL statistics ==
Player Statistics by Season
Season	Games Played	Minutes Per Game	FG%	FT%	Rebounds Per Game	Assists Per Game	Steals Per Game	Blocks Per Game	Turnovers Per Game	Fouls Per Game	Points Per Game
2024-2025	10	26.0	57	75	9.1	1.6	0.9	1.4	2.7	2.0	12.9
2023-2024	27	20.9	59	64	6.2	0.5	1.4	0.5	1.6	2.8	9.6
2022-2023	16	13.0	82	80	4.4	0.4	0.7	0.3	1.0	2.4	5.0
2021-2022	17	19.6	51	72	5.7	0.5	1.2	0.3	1.5	2.5	6.2
2020-2021	36	17.1	54	77	5.9	0.7	1.0	0.2	1.1	2.0	5.2
2019-2020	6	3.1	50	100	1.5	0.0	0.2	0.0	0.5	0.7	1.3
2018-2019	6	1.9	75	0	0.7	0.2	0.0	0.0	0.3	0.7	1.0
2017-2018	5	1.3	50	0	0.2	0.0	0.2	0.0	0.0	0.2	0.4

== Personal life ==
Harrison's family hail from the Coromandel Peninsula in New Zealand, with roots in the Ngāti Porou and Ngāpuhi iwi.

Harrison and his partner, fellow basketball player Kalani Purcell, had their first child in 2023.
