= Alex Franklin =

Puerto Rican basketball player (born 1988)

No. 42 – Gigantes de Carolina
- Position: Small forward
- League: Baloncesto Superior Nacional

Personal information
- Born: July 11, 1988 (age 38) Reading, Pennsylvania, U.S.
- Listed height: 6 ft 6 in (1.98 m)
- Listed weight: 226 lb (103 kg)

Career information
- High school: Reading Central Catholic (Reading, Pennsylvania)
- College: Siena (2006–2010)
- NBA draft: 2010: undrafted
- Playing career: 2010–present

Career history
- 2010–2011: CB Tarragona
- 2011: JA Vichy
- 2011–2012: Lobe Huesca
- 2012: Indios de Mayagüez
- 2012–2013: Soles de Mexicali
- 2014: Indios de Mayagüez
- 2015: Maccabi Ra'anana
- 2015–2016: Vaqueros de Bayamón
- 2016–2018: Atléticos de San Germán
- 2018–2019: Piratas de Quebradillas
- 2019–2020: Abejas de León
- 2020–2021: Real Estelí
- 2021–2022: Brujos de Guayama
- 2022–present: Gigantes de Carolina

Career highlights
- 2× BSN champion (2012, 2023); BSN Finals MVP (2012); MAAC Player of the Year (2010); First-team All-MAAC (2010); 2× Second-team All-MAAC (2008, 2009)
Medals
Men's basketball
Representing Puerto Rico
Centrobasket
Silver medal – second place	2014 Mexico	Team competition
Silver medal – second place	2012 Puerto Rico	Team competition
Central American and Caribbean Games
Bronze medal – third place	2014 Mexico	Team competition

Alexander Demetri Franklin (born July 11, 1988) is a Puerto Rican professional basketball player for Gigantes de Carolina of the Baloncesto Superior Nacional (BSN). He is best known for his college career at Siena College and as a member of the Puerto Rican national team.

== College career ==
Franklin, a small forward from Reading, Pennsylvania, played at Siena from 2006 to 2010. In his time there, he led the Saints to three Metro Atlantic Athletic Conference (MAAC) titles and was named the MAAC Player of the Year and an AP honorable mention All-American as a senior in 2009–10. He left the school with 1,730 points and 930 rebounds for his career.

== Professional career ==
Following college, Franklin played professionally in Spain and France as well as several teams in Puerto Rico's Baloncesto Superior Nacional. In 2012, Franklin led the Mayagüez Indians to its first championship and was named playoff MVP.

In February 2015, he signed with Maccabi Ra'anana of Israel. In May 2015, he signed with Vaqueros de Bayamón of Puerto Rico.

== National career ==
On August 19, 2014, Franklin was named to Puerto Rico's squad for the 2014 FIBA Basketball World Cup.

== Personal life ==
Franklin, whose mother is Puerto Rican, first played for Puerto Rico's national team at 2012 Centrobasket.
