= Benito Santiago Jr. =

Puerto Rican basketball player

No. 22 – Indios de Mayagüez
- Position: Small forward
- League: Baloncesto Superior Nacional

Personal information
- Born: June 22, 1989 (age 37) Coamo, Puerto Rico
- Listed height: 6 ft 6 in (1.98 m)
- Listed weight: 210 lb (95 kg)

Career information
- College: Miami Dade College (2009–2010); Lon Morris College (2010–2011); University of the Cumberlands (2011–2013)
- NBA draft: 2013: undrafted
- Playing career: 2013–present

Career history
- 2012–2013: Indios de Mayagüez
- 2013–2014: Santeros de Aguada
- 2014–2017: Atléticos de San Germán
- 2017–2023: Vaqueros de Bayamón
- 2024: Mets de Guaynabo
- 2024–2025: Cangrejeros de Santurce
- 2026–present: Indios de Mayagüez

Benito Santiago Jr. (born June 22, 1989) is a Puerto Rican professional basketball player for Indios de Mayagüez of the Baloncesto Superior Nacional (BSN). He played college basketball for Cumberlands. He is a former baseball player just like his father, Benito Santiago.

== Personal life ==
Santiago is the son of former Major League Baseball player Benito Santiago.

== Baseball career ==
Santiago was selected in the 31st round of the 2010 Major League Baseball draft by the Chicago Cubs.
