= Walter Hodge =

Puerto Rican-Virgin Islander basketball player (born 1986)

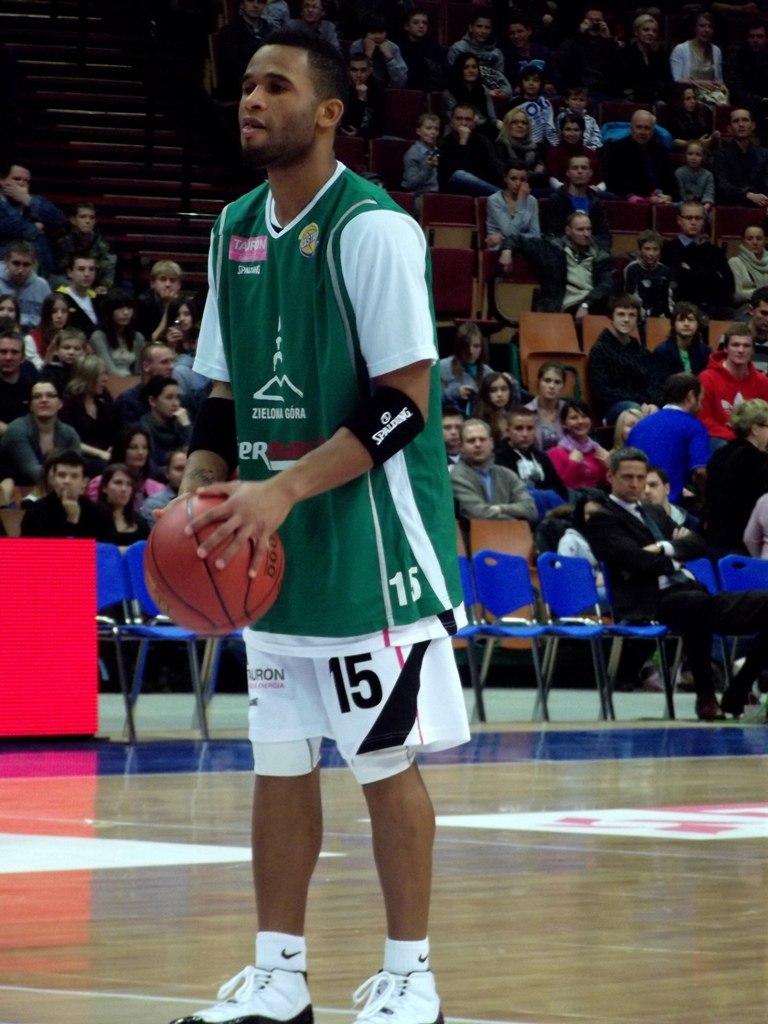
- Hodge with Zielona Góra, in 2012.

No. 15 – Cangrejeros de Santurce
- Position: Point guard
- League: Baloncesto Superior Nacional

Personal information
- Born: September 21, 1986 (age 40) Guaynabo, Puerto Rico
- Listed height: 5 ft 11 in (1.80 m)
- Listed weight: 170 lb (77 kg)

Career information
- High school: Florida Air Academy (Melbourne, Florida)
- College: Florida (2005–2009)
- NBA draft: 2009: undrafted
- Playing career: 2009–present

Career history
- 2009: Capitanes de Arecibo
- 2010–2011: Cangrejeros de Santurce
- 2010–2013: Zielona Góra
- 2013–2014: Saski Baskonia
- 2014: →Capitanes de Arecibo
- 2014–2015: Zenit Saint Petersburg
- 2015–2024: Capitanes de Arecibo
- 2015–2016: Cantù
- 2016–2017: ASVEL
- 2017–2019: Homenetmen Beirut
- 2019–2020: Sagesse Club
- 2020: Al-Wahda
- 2020: US Monastir
- 2021–2022: Zamalek
- 2022: Kuwait
- 2022–2023: Al Ahly
- 2023–2024: Homenetmen Beirut
- 2024: Al Ahli Tripoli
- 2024–2025: Zielona Góra
- 2025–present: Cangrejeros de Santurce
- 2025: Astros de Jalisco
- 2025–2026: Sagesse Club

Career highlights
- Kuwaiti League champion (2022); Kuwaiti Division I Basketball League MVP (2021); BAL Most Valuable Player (2021); BAL champion (2021); All-BAL First Team (2021); Egyptian League champion (2021); EuroCup Top Scorer (2013); All-EuroCup Second Team (2013); French LNB All-Star (2017); Polish League champion (2013); 2× Polish League MVP (2012, 2013); Polish League Top Scorer (2012); 3× BSN champion (2016, 2018, 2021); 2× BSN Finals MVP (2018, 2021); 2× BSN Most Valuable Player (2014, 2022); BSN Sixth Man of the Year (2025); Arab Club Championship champion (2017); Lebanese League champion (2018); Lebanese Basketball League Cup winner (2018); No. 15 jersey retired by Zielona Góra; 2× NCAA champion (2006, 2007)

Walter Wallace Hodge Muñoz (born September 21, 1986) is a Puerto Rican-U.S. Virgin Islander professional basketball player for Cangrejeros de Santurce of the Baloncesto Superior Nacional (BSN). Internationally, Hodge plays with the senior U.S. Virgin Islands national basketball team, due to eligibility arising from his Virgin Islander grandfather. After being a reserve point guard in his first two seasons with the Florida Gators, he became the starting point guard for the two-time defending national champions in the 2007–08 season. On June 5, 2013, in appreciation for his contribution to Zielona Góra, his jersey number was retired.

== Early years ==
Hodge was born in San Juan, Puerto Rico. He attended Florida Air Academy in Melbourne, Florida, a private military academy, and played high school basketball for the Florida Air Falcons. The Falcons won the state championships, with undefeated teams, during his sophomore and senior seasons.

== College career ==
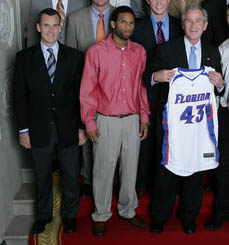
Hodge, center, between coach Billy Donovan and George W. Bush.

Hodge accepted an athletic scholarship to attend the University of Florida, where he played for head coach Billy Donovan's Florida Gators men's basketball, team from 2005 to 2009. Playing a reserve role in the 2005–06 season, Hodge averaged 3.9 points and 1.2 assists per game, as a freshman. He started 8 games in Southeastern Conference (SEC) play, and averaged 19 minutes per contest, during the Gators' first national title run.

Hodge had a decreased number of starts and minutes during the 2006–07 season, starting just three games, but increasing his scoring average to 5.7 points per game, as the Gators repeated as national champions. He had a career high of 17 points against Florida State, and finished the season hitting exactly 50% of three-point shot attempts. With the departure of Taurean Green to the NBA, and Lee Humphrey to graduation/playing overseas, Hodge became the starting point guard for the Gators, during the 2007–08 season.

== Professional career ==
In August 2010 Hodge signed with the Polish League team Zielona Góra. In April 2012, Hodge was named the Most Valuable Player of the Polish Basketball League. As the Zastal Zielona Góra's top player, he won with his team the 2011–12 Polish League Bronze Medal (3rd place).

In the 2012–13 season, Zielona Góra's team debuted in the European-wide 2nd-tier level EuroCup, and advanced to the Last 16. Hodge was the team's leader, with averages of 21.2 points and 5.4 assists per game, while shooting 51.7% overall from the field (52.4% on 2 point field goals) and 50% on 3 point field goals (making 25 out of 50 attempts). In week 6, he took the EuroCup Basketball Player of the Round honors. On February 25, 2013, Hodge was awarded the Polish-Czech All Star Game MVP (he scored 22 points in the game). He was named to the All-EuroCup Second Team in 2013. In June 2013 he won the Polish League championship. It was the first Polish national championship in Zielona Góra's history. On June 5, 2013, Basket Zielona Góra retired Hodge's jersey number 15. He became the first player in the club's history to be honored with a jersey retirement.

In June 2013, Hodge signed a two-year deal with Spanish club Laboral Kutxa Vitoria. In February 2014, he was loaned to Puerto Rican club Capitanes de Arecibo, for the rest of the season. In August 2014, he parted ways with Laboral Kutxa, and signed with Russian club Zenit Saint Petersburg. On May 6, Hodge returned to Capitanes de Arecibo.

On July 31, 2017, Hodge signed with Homenetmen Beirut of the Lebanese Basketball League. After playing with Capitanes de Arecibo for some time in 2018, Hodge returned to Homenetmen Beirut on September 25, 2018.

Hodge signed with Sagesse Club in Lebanon in 2019 and averaged 22 points per game. Later he joined Al Wahdi in Saudi Arabia. On September 21, 2020, Hodge signed with US Monastir of the Championnat National A.

In September 2020, Hodge signed with US Monastir in Tunisia.

In October, Hodge signed with Zamalek in Egypt. He played with the team in the 2021 season of the Basketball Africa League, winning the first-ever championship. Hodge had 12 points and 4 assists in the final and was named the first-ever BAL Most Valuable Player.

On July 27, 2022, the Egyptian defending champions Al Ahly of the Super League announced it had signed Hodge for the 2022–23 season. In March 2023, he returned to the Capitanes de Arecibo after using an opt-out clause in his contract with Al Ahly.

In January 2024, Hodge received an offer from his former club Zastal Zielona Góra, but he decided to sign a 10-day contract with Al Ahli Tripoli from Libya for the Dubai Tournament.

On October 2, 2024, Hodge returned to Al Ahli Tripoli for a second stint.

On October 26, 2024, he signed with Zastal Zielona Góra of the Polish Basketball League (PLK).

== National team career ==
Hodge is a member of the senior U.S. Virgin Islands national basketball team. With the U.S. Virgin Islands, he played at the 2009 FIBA Americas Championship, the 2010 Centrobasket, the 2011 FIBA CBC Championship, where he won a gold medal, the 2012 Centrobasket, the 2014 Centrobasket, the 2016 Centrobasket, and the 2017 FIBA AmeriCup.

On February 21, 2021, Hodge scored a national team career-high 44 points in a 95–90 loss to Canada.

== Awards and accomplishments ==
=== College ===
- 2× SEC men's tournament champion: (2006, 2007)
- 2× NCAA men's Division I tournament champion: (2006, 2007)

=== Zielona Góra ===
- EuroCup Last 16 Week 6 MVP: (2013)
- All-EuroCup Second Team: (2013)
- Polish League Champion: (2013)
- Polish League 3rd Place: (2012)
- 2× Polish League Regular Season MVP: (2012, 2013)
- Polish League Top Scorer: (2012)
- 2× All-Polish League First Team: (2012, 2013)
- Polish League 3rd Place Game MVP: (2012)
- Polish League All-Star Game MVP: (2013)
- Polish League All-Star Game Starting Lineup Top Vote-Getter: (2013)
- 3× Polish League All-Star Game Participant: (2011, 2012, 2013)
- Eurobasket.com's All-Polish League Third Team: (2011)
- First player in Zielona Góra's basketball history with a retired jersey (#15).

=== Baloncesto Superior Nacional ===
- Puerto Rican League MVP: (2014, 2022)
- Puerto Rican League Finals MVP: (2018, 2020, 2021)
- 5× Puerto Rican League All-Star Game Starter: (2021, 2022, 2023, 2024, 2025)
- 6× Puerto Rican League All-Star Game Participant: (2021, 2022, 2023, 2024, 2025, 2026)

=== Homenetmen Beirut ===
- Arab Club Championship Champion: (2017)
- Lebanese League Champion: (2018)
- Lebanese Cup Winner: (2018)
- Lebanese League League MVP: (2018)
- Lebanese League Guard of the Year: (2019)
- Lebanese League Import of the Year: (2019)
- Lebanese League 1st Team: (2019)
- Lebanese League All-Imports Team: (2019)

=== Zamalek ===
- Basketball Africa League winner: (2021)
- BAL Most Valuable Player: (2021)
- Egyptian Basketball Super League winner: (2021)

== BAL career statistics ==
Legend
GP	Games played	GS	Games started	MPG	Minutes per game
FG%	Field goal percentage	3P%	3-point field goal percentage	FT%	Free throw percentage
RPG	Rebounds per game	APG	Assists per game	SPG	Steals per game
BPG	Blocks per game	PPG	Points per game	**Bold**	Career high
†	Won an BAL championship

Year	Team	GP	GS	MPG	FG%	3P%	FT%	RPG	APG	SPG	BPG	PPG
2021†	Zamalek	6	6	27.6	.486	.370	.882	5.0	5.8	.5	.0	15.5
Career		6	6	27.6	.486	.370	.882	5.0	5.8	.5	.0	15.5

== See also ==
- List of NCAA Division I men's basketball players with 145 games played
