= Nelson Colón =

Puerto Rican basketball coach

Personal information
- Born: January 24, 1978 (age 48) Ponce, Puerto Rico
- Position: Head coach

Career history

Coaching
- 2011–2012: Atléticos de San Germán
- 2013–2017: Leones de Ponce
- 2015: Puerto Rico (assistant)
- 2018–2024: Vaqueros de Bayamón
- 2021–2024: Puerto Rico
- 2025–2026: Cangrejeros de Santurce
- 2026–present: Panama

Career highlights
- 4× BSN champion (2014, 2015, 2020, 2022); 3× BSN Coach of the Year (2011, 2018, 2020)

Nelson Edgardo Colón Santiago (January 24, 1978) is a Puerto Rican professional basketball coach who is currently the head coach of Panama. He previously coached the Leones de Ponce, winning consecutive championships in 2014 and 2015. He also was the head coach of the Puerto Rican national team.
