= Phillip Wheeler (basketball) =

American basketball player (born 2002)

No. 23 – Valley Suns
- Position: Small forward
- League: NBA G League

Personal information
- Born: April 23, 2002 (age 24) Rumson, New Jersey, U.S.
- Listed height: 6 ft 8 in (2.03 m)
- Listed weight: 190 lb (86 kg)

Career information
- High school: Rumson-Fair Haven (Rumson, New Jersey); Ranney School (Tinton Falls, New Jersey)
- NBA draft: 2021: undrafted
- Playing career: 2021–present

Career history
- 2021–2022: Rio Grande Valley Vipers
- 2022–2023: Iowa Wolves
- 2023–2024: Mexico City Capitanes
- 2024–2025: Texas Legends
- 2025: Maine Celtics
- 2025: Philadelphia 76ers
- 2025–2026: Osceola Magic
- 2025–2026: Piratas de Quebradillas
- 2026: NBA G League United
- 2026–present: Valley Suns

Career highlights
- FIBA Intercontinental Cup champion (2026)
- Stats at NBA.com
- Stats at Basketball Reference

Phillip Wheeler (born April 23, 2002) is an American professional basketball player for the Valley Suns of the NBA G League. He has previously played four games in the National Basketball Association (NBA) for the Philadelphia 76ers.

== High school career ==
Wheeler played for his freshman and sophomore years at Rumson-Fair Haven Regional High School before transferring to the Ranney School for the 2018–19 school year, where he averaged 10.8 points and 4.5 rebounds as a junior. Wheeler decided to sign a contract with Stella Azzurra Roma instead of returning to play his senior year.

== Professional career ==
=== Stella Azzurra ===
Wheeler appeared in 4 games for the Stella Azzurra U18 team at the Euroleague Basketball Next Generation Tournament. He averaged 8.3 points and 4.3 rebounds in 13.9 minutes.

=== Atleticos de San German ===
Atleticos de San German selected Wheeler with the 5th overall pick in the 2020 Baloncesto Superior Nacional draft.

=== Gimnasia y Esgrima de Comodoro Rivadavia ===
On January 25, 2021, Wheeler signed with Gimnasia y Esgrima de Comodoro Rivadavia of the Liga Nacional de Básquetbol. Wheeler continued to play for San German in the summer.

=== Rio Grande Valley Vipers ===
Later in 2021, Wheeler tried out for the Rio Grande Valley Vipers in the NBA G-League. Wheeler did not make the team and instead became an unpaid practice player for the Vipers. The Vipers signed Wheeler on January 24, 2022. Wheeler played sparingly in two games before being waived on the January 31. Wheeler also came off the bench in four games for the Ciudad de Mexico Capitanes during the 2021 Tip-Off Tournament.

=== Philadelphia 76ers ===
On March 26, 2025, Wheeler signed a 10-day contract with the Philadelphia 76ers via a hardship exception. In his NBA debut that day against the Washington Wizards, Wheeler recorded four points and four rebounds. Wheeler's contract expired on April 3.

=== Piratas de Quebradillas ===
Wheeler joined Piratas de Quebradillas in April 2025. He was selected for the BSN All Star Game in June 2025.

On July 4, 2025, Wheeler joined the 2025 NBA Summer League Indiana Pacers' roster. Wheeler had a successful run with the Pacers, scoring big numbers in little minutes. On October 13, he signed a training camp contract with the Orlando Magic. However, Wheeler was waived by the Magic on October 18. He then joined the Osceola Magic of the NBA G League.

== Career statistics ==
Legend
GP	Games played	GS	Games started	MPG	Minutes per game
FG%	Field goal percentage	3P%	3-point field goal percentage	FT%	Free throw percentage
RPG	Rebounds per game	APG	Assists per game	SPG	Steals per game
BPG	Blocks per game	PPG	Points per game	**Bold**	Career high

=== NBA ===
==== Regular season ====
Year	Team	GP	GS	MPG	FG%	3P%	FT%	RPG	APG	SPG	BPG	PPG
2024–25	Philadelphia	5	0	8.9	.143	.000	1.000	1.6	.4	.2	.4	1.6
Career		5	0	8.9	.143	.000	1.000	1.6	.4	.2	.4	1.6
