= Gigantes de Carolina (men's basketball) =

Puerto Rican professional basketball team

Gigantes de Carolina / Canovanas
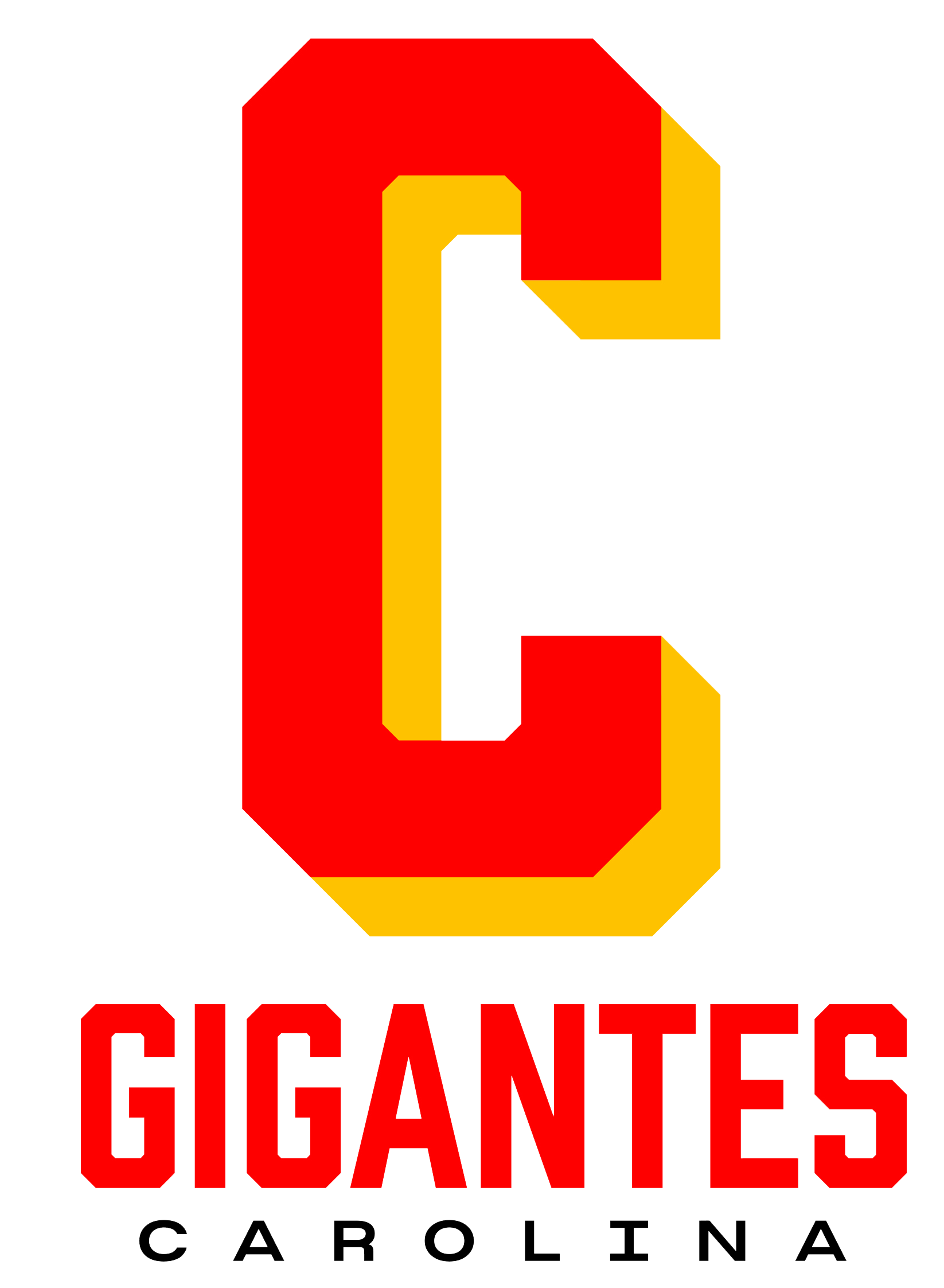
- Nickname: La C, El Calentón (The C, The Heatwave)
- Leagues: Baloncesto Superior Nacional
- Founded: 1971
- History: Gigantes de Carolina (1971–2009; 2021–present)
- Arena: Carlos Miguel Mangual Coliseum
- Capacity: 5,500
- Location: Canóvanas, Puerto Rico
- Team colors: Red, white, black, purple
- Head coach: Carlos Gonzales
- Team captain: Alex Franklin
- Ownership: Héctor Horta
- Championships: 1 (2023)
- Website: https://www.guerrabsn.com/equipos/gigantes
| Home | Away | Third |
| Fourth | Fifth |

The Gigantes de Carolina / Canovanas are a Puerto Rican professional basketball team in the Baloncesto Superior Nacional based in Canóvanas, Puerto Rico. After 12 years of inaction, they returned for the 2021 season.

== History ==
They've participated in the Baloncesto Superior Nacional (BSN) from 1971 to 2009; with breaks in 1994, '98, '99, '05, '06, and '10. They have made the BSN Finals three times in their history, 1979 (vs. the Piratas de Quebradillas), 1997 (vs. Atléticos de San Germán), and 2008 (vs. Capitanes de Arecibo), losing them all.

In 2008, the Gigantes advanced to the league's "Super 6" semifinals. The team earned a lead in this phase and came close to receiving a guaranteed spot in the league's final by defeating the Cangrejeros de Santurce in the final stages of the "Super 6". The Gigantes entered this series with only two games left for qualification. However, Santurce won the second game with score of 99–83. Carolina eventually won the series and eliminated Santurce. The Gigantes and the Capitanes were the teams that advanced to the finals. The series extended to seven games, with both teams winning three games at home. Arecibo won the seventh game with scores of 99–94.

After 12 years of inaction, they returned for the 2021 season.

On July 27 2023, the Gigantes De Carolina defeated the Bayamon Vaqueros 80–60 in Game 5 of the BSN Finals, to become the 2023 BSN Champions.

== Current roster ==
Gigantes de Carolina roster
Players
Coaches

| Pos. | No. | Nat. | Name | Ht. | Wt. | Age |
|---|---|---|---|---|---|---|
| PG | 2 | (Puerto Rico) | Ortiz, Evander | 5 ft 11 in (1.80 m) | 180 lb (82 kg) | 28 – July 14, 1997 |
| C | 4 | (Puerto Rico) | Conditt IV, George | 6 ft 11 in (2.11 m) | 234 lb (106 kg) | 25 – August 22, 2000 |
| PF | 5 | (United States) | Tyson, Hunter (I) | 6 ft 8 in (2.03 m) | 215 lb (98 kg) | 26 – June 13, 2000 |
| G/F | 7 | (United States) | Rivera, Joshua | 6 ft 6 in (1.98 m) | 220 lb (100 kg) | 22 – August 5, 2003 |
| F/C | 15 | (Puerto Rico) | Parker-Rivera, Timajh | 6 ft 8 in (2.03 m) | 235 lb (107 kg) | 32 – February 9, 1994 |
| G/F | 20 | (Puerto Rico) | Cruz, Jesús | 6 ft 5 in (1.96 m) | 200 lb (91 kg) | 28 – February 12, 1998 |
| F | 23 | (Puerto Rico) | Rivera, Daniel | 6 ft 7 in (2.01 m) | 215 lb (98 kg) | 23 – November 3, 2002 |
| SG | 24 | (United States) | Nowell, Jaylen (I) | 6 ft 4 in (1.93 m) | 200 lb (91 kg) | 26 – July 9, 1999 |
| PG | 25 | (Puerto Rico) | López, Luis | 6 ft 1 in (1.85 m) | 180 lb (82 kg) | 28 – April 25, 1998 |
| PF | 31 | (United States) | James, Scottie (I) | 6 ft 8 in (2.03 m) | 235 lb (107 kg) | 29 – November 7, 1996 |
| G/F | 32 | (Puerto Rico) | San Antonio, Tory | 6 ft 4 in (1.93 m) | 190 lb (86 kg) | 25 – June 1, 2001 |
| F | 42 | (Puerto Rico) | Franklin, Alex (C) | 6 ft 6 in (1.98 m) | 225 lb (102 kg) | 37 – July 11, 1988 |
| F | 45 | (Puerto Rico) | Dominguez, Dyondre | 6 ft 8 in (2.03 m) | 190 lb (86 kg) | 25 – September 8, 2000 |
| PG | 51 | (Puerto Rico) | Waters, Tremont | 5 ft 10 in (1.78 m) | 175 lb (79 kg) | 28 – January 10, 1998 |
| SG | 55 | (Puerto Rico) | Muñiz, Jevin Nikolas | 6 ft 6 in (1.98 m) | 190 lb (86 kg) | 23 – January 8, 2003 |

Head coach

- (Puerto Rico) Carlos González

Assistant coach(es)

- (Puerto Rico) Leonel Arill
- (Puerto Rico) Alejandro Carmona

Legend

- (C) Team captain
- (DC) Dual citizenship
- (I) Import player
- Injured

- Roster
Updated: 20 May 2026

| Pos. | Starting 5 | Bench 1 | Bench 2 |
|---|---|---|---|
| C | George Conditt IV | Hunter Tyson | Timajh Parker-Rivera |
| PF | Dyondre Dominguez | Scottie James | Joshua Rivera |
| SF | Daniel Rivera | Alex Franklin | Tory San Antonio |
| SG | Jaylen Nowell | Jesús Cruz | Jevin Nikolas Muñiz |
| PG | Tremont Waters | Evander Ortiz | Luis López |

== Notable players ==
- (Puerto Rico) Butch Lee
- (Puerto Rico) Joél Curbelo
- (United States) Diante Garrett
- (United States) Sheldon Mac
- (United States) Justin Tillman
- (Puerto Rico) Tremont Waters
