= RJ Meléndez =

Puerto Rican basketball player (born 2002)

No. 22 – Tezenis Verona
- Position: Small forward
- League: LBA

Personal information
- Born: December 3, 2002 (age 23) Arecibo, Puerto Rico
- Listed height: 6 ft 7 in (2.01 m)
- Listed weight: 200 lb (91 kg)

Career information
- High school: Central Pointe Christian Academy (Kissimmee, Florida)
- College: Illinois (2021–2023); Georgia (2023–2024); Mississippi State (2024–2025)
- NBA draft: 2025: undrafted
- Playing career: 2025–present

Career history
- 2025–2026: Mexico City Capitanes
- 2026: Capitanes de Arecibo
- 2026–present: Scaligera Basket Verona
Medals
Men's basketball
Representing Puerto Rico
Centrobasket U17 Championship
Silver medal – second place	2019 Puerto Rico	Team

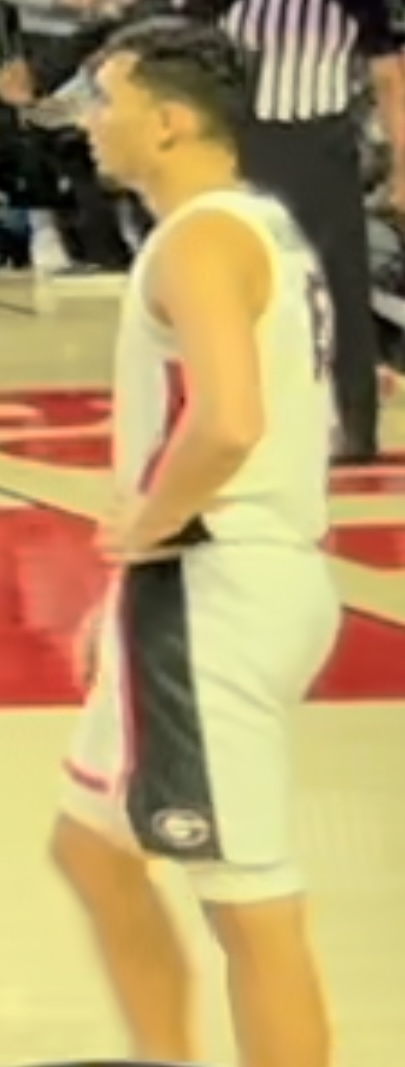
Meléndez in 2024

Ramses "RJ" Meléndez Vega (born December 3, 2002) is a Puerto Rican basketball player for the Scaligera Basket Verona of the Lega Basket Serie A. He played college basketball for the Mississippi State Bulldogs. He previously played for the Illinois Fighting Illini of the Big Ten Conference and the Georgia Bulldogs of the Southeastern Conference. He has represented the Puerto Rico men's national basketball team.

== Early life ==
Meléndez was born in Arecibo, Puerto Rico. He attended high school at Central Pointe Christian Academy in Kissimmee, Florida.

As a junior, he averaged 18.6 points per game. He led CPCA to its first-ever SIAA state title and earned finals MVP honors. He averaged 24.3 points, 6.1 rebounds, 3.4 assists, 2.2 steals and 2.3 blocks as a senior, leading Central Pointe (CPCA) to a 33-7 record and took home Sunshine Independent Athletic Association (SIAA) Player of the Year and first-team All-SIAA. He finished his career as CPCA’s all-time leading scorer with 2,006 points.

His high school coach was Boricua legend Richie Dalmau.

In high school, Meléndez was rated a four-star recruit. He was ranked No. 56 by ESPN, No. 93 by 247Sports Composite and No. 117 by Rivals. He chose Illinois over Florida, Oklahoma State, Dayton, LSU, Ole Miss, VCU, Nebraska, Virginia Tech, DePaul, Iowa State, Georgia, Georgia Tech, Alabama, St. John’s, Rhode Island, UMass, Florida Atlantic and South Florida.

== College career ==
As a freshman, Meléndez played in 22 games. He averaged 3.8 points and 1.7 rebounds.

In a matchup versus the University of Houston in the 2022 NCAA tournament, Meléndez was assessed a controversial technical foul for hanging on the rim after he completed a dunk. Hall of Fame basketball player Reggie Miller, now working as a broadcaster, stated “First of all, his momentum is taking him with him, he has to swing back,” Miller said. “You cannot give this young man a technical foul for this. He's not showing up or anything, because if he doesn't [hang on the rim] he is going to almost kill himself. You've gotta swing on the rim right here.” The dunk cut the lead to 4 in favor of Houston, but the technical foul awarded Houston free throws and the basketball. Illinois coach Brad Underwood lamented the shift in momentum caused by the call. The Cougars won the game 68–53 and moved on to their second consecutive Sweet 16. Meléndez provided nine points and three assists in the game. The referee that made the call, Brian O'Connell, did not work another game for the remainder of the tournament.

In his sophomore year, Meléndez' playing time increased, but his offensive performance declined to the point where he could only be counted on for his defense. After his disappointing sophomore season, Meléndez entered the transfer portal. He ultimately opted to transfer to Georgia.

Following his junior season at Georgia, Melendez transferred again, this time to Mississippi State. He averaged 8.8 points and 4.3 rebounds per game.

== Professional career ==
In 2025, Melendez signed with the Mexico City Capitanes of the NBA G League.

On July 22, 2026, he signed with Scaligera Basket Verona of the Italian Lega Basket Serie A (LBA).

== National team ==
Melendez played in the 2019 U17 Centrobasket Championships. He averaged 9.2 points and 3.2 rebounds per game and helped Puerto Rico to a silver medal.

== Career statistics ==
Legend
GP	Games played	GS	Games started	MPG	Minutes per game
FG%	Field goal percentage	3P%	3-point field goal percentage	FT%	Free throw percentage
RPG	Rebounds per game	APG	Assists per game	SPG	Steals per game
BPG	Blocks per game	PPG	Points per game	**Bold**	Career high

=== College ===
Year	Team	GP	GS	MPG	FG%	3P%	FT%	RPG	APG	SPG	BPG	PPG
2021–22	Illinois	22	1	8.5	.569	.600	.850	1.7	.7	.3	.1	3.8
2022–23	Illinois	32	18	21.5	.376	.264	.833	3.5	.9	.7	.4	6.0
2023–24	Georgia	36	7	20.6	.451	.304	.882	4.1	.8	1.1	.2	9.6
2024–25	Mississippi State	34	29	22.4	.439	.280	.747	4.3	.9	.9	.6	8.8

== Personal life ==
Meléndez is the son of Mariel Vega and Omar Meléndez. He is majoring in recreation, sport and tourism.
