= Coliseo Manuel Iguina =

Indoor sporting arena in Arecibo, Puerto Rico

Coordinates: 18°27′23″N 66°44′58″W

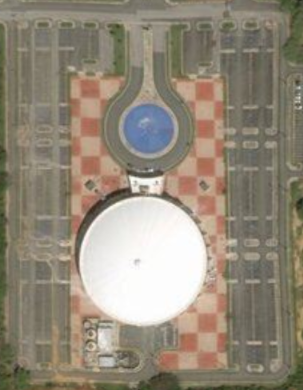

Coliseo de Arecibo Manuel G. Iguina Reyes (English: Manuel Iguina Coliseum) is an indoor sporting arena located in Arecibo, Puerto Rico. The capacity of the arena is 10,000 persons. The Coliseo Manuel Iguina is also known as Coliseo de Arecibo. It is managed by Capitanes de Arecibo Interprise. It is the home of Capitanes de Arecibo basketball and volleyball team. The basketball team is a member of Baloncesto Superior Nacional.
