= BSN Most Valuable Player Award =

Annual MVP award of Puerto Rico basketball league

The BSN Most Valuable Player (Jugador Más Valioso) is an annual most valuable player award of Puerto Rico's top-tier level professional basketball league, the Baloncesto Superior Nacional (BSN), that is given to the best performing player of the regular season. The award is decided by a panel of local sportswriters and broadcasters, each of whom casts votes. As of November 2026, Travis Trice is the reigning Most Valuable Player, having won the award for the second time in 2026. Previously named MVP in 2024, Trice joined an exclusive group of players to have received the league’s highest individual honor on multiple occasions.

Juan "Pachín" Vicéns, Teófilo Cruz, and Mario "Quijote" Morales won the award a record four times. Juan Báez, Raymond Dalmau, Georgie Torres, and Christian Dalmau won the BSN Most Valuable Player award three times.

== Winners ==
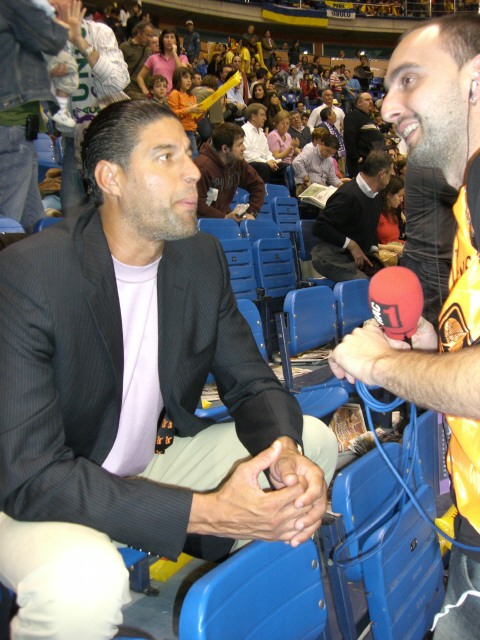
José Ortiz won the award in 2002 as a member of the Cangrejeros de Santurce.

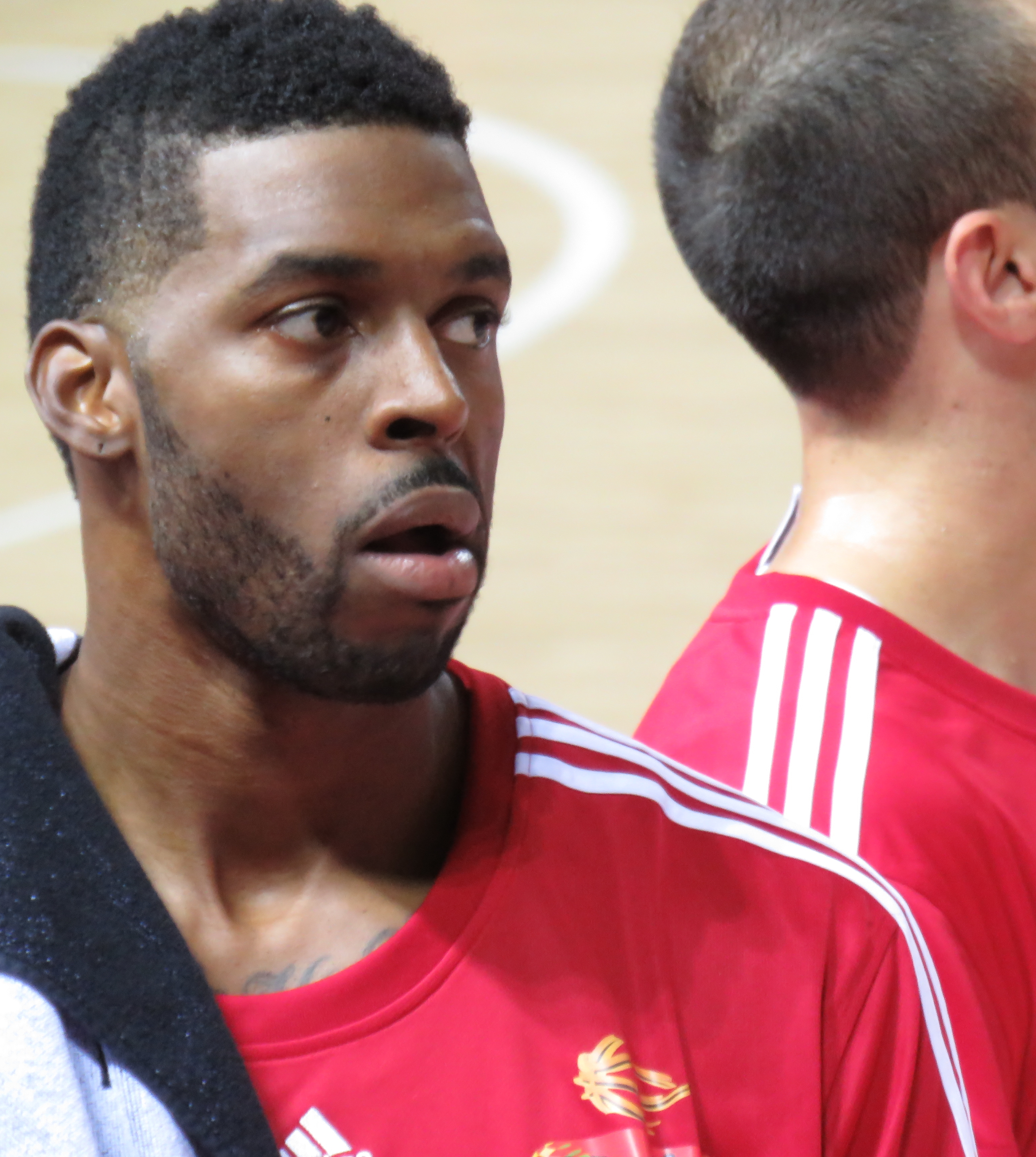
Donta Smith followed consecutive two-time winner Christian Dalmau in 2012.

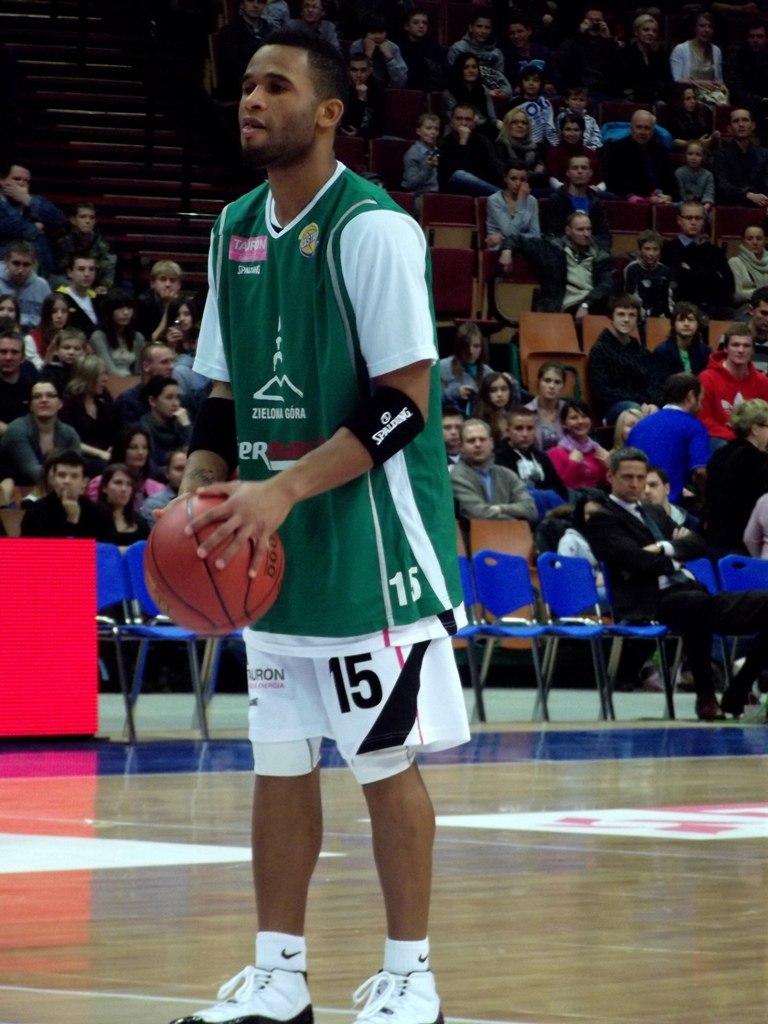
Walter Hodge won the award in 2014, after leading the league in assists. He won it for a second time in 2022.

^	Denotes player who is still active in the BSN
†	Denotes player whose team won championship that year
Player (X)	Denotes the number of times the player had been named MVP at that time
Team (X)	Denotes the number of times a player from this team had won at that time

Season	Player	Position	Nationality	Team
1950				
1951	Raúl "Tinajón" Feliciano	Guard	Puerto Rico	Gallitos de la UPR
1952	Juan "Pachín" Vicéns	Guard	Puerto Rico	Leones de Ponce
1953	Fufi Santori	Guard	Puerto Rico	Gallitos de la UPR
1954	Juan "Pachín" Vicéns (2)	Guard	Puerto Rico	Leones de Ponce
1955	Raúl "Tinajón" Feliciano (2)	Guard	Puerto Rico	Cardenales de Río Piedras
1956				
1957	Juan Báez	Center	Puerto Rico	Cardenales de Río Piedras
1958	Juan "Pachín" Vicéns (3)	Guard	Puerto Rico	Leones de Ponce
1959	Bill McCadney	Center	Puerto Rico	Capitanes de Arecibo
1960	Juan "Pachín" Vicéns (4)	Guard	Puerto Rico	Leones de Ponce
1961	Tomás "Guabina" Gutiérrez	Guard	Puerto Rico	Leones de Ponce
1962	Teófilo Cruz	Center	Puerto Rico	Cangrejeros de Santurce
1963	Juan Báez (2)	Center	Puerto Rico	Cardenales de Río Piedras
1964	Juan Báez (3)	Center	Puerto Rico	Cardenales de Río Piedras
1965	Richie Pietri		Puerto Rico	Atléticos de San Germán
1966	Jaime Frontera	Guard/forward	Puerto Rico	Capitanes de Arecibo
1967	Teófilo Cruz (2)	Center	Puerto Rico	Cangrejeros de Santurce
1968	Raymond Dalmau	Power forward	Puerto Rico	Piratas de Quebradillas
1969	Raymond Dalmau (2)	Power forward	Puerto Rico	Piratas de Quebradillas
1970	Teófilo Cruz (3)	Center	Puerto Rico	Cangrejeros de Santurce
1971	Teófilo Cruz (4)	Center	Puerto Rico	Cangrejeros de Santurce
1972	Raymond Dalmau (3)	Power forward	Puerto Rico	Piratas de Quebradillas
1973	Neftalí Rivera	Shooting guard	Puerto Rico	Piratas de Quebradillas
1974	Jimmy Thordsen		Puerto Rico	Gallitos de Isabela
1975	Josean Baez	Shooting guard	Puerto Rico	Leones de Ponce
1976	Earl Brown	Center	Puerto Rico	Cardenales de Río Piedras
1977	Hector Olivencia	Guard	Puerto Rico	Criollos de Caguas
1978	Carlos "Charlie" Bermúdez	Center	Puerto Rico	Indios de Canovanas
1979	Rubén Rodríguez	Forward/center	Puerto Rico	Vaqueros de Bayamón
1980	Mario "Quijote" Morales	Forward	Puerto Rico	Mets de Guaynabo
1981	Rolando Frazer	Forward/center	Panama	Polluelos de Aibonito
1982	Mario "Quijote" Morales (2)	Forward	Puerto Rico	Mets de Guaynabo
1983	Mario "Quijote" Morales (3)	Forward	Puerto Rico	Mets de Guaynabo
1984	Georgie Torres	Guard/forward	Puerto Rico	Cariduros de Fajardo
1985	Georgie Torres (2)	Guard/forward	Puerto Rico	Cariduros de Fajardo
1986	Georgie Torres (3)	Guard/forward	Puerto Rico	Cariduros de Fajardo
1987	Rolando Frazer (2)	Forward/center	Panama	Polluelos de Aibonito
1988	Mario Butler	Center	Panama	Titanes de Morovis
1989	Ramón Rivas	Forward/center	Puerto Rico	Gigantes de Carolina
1990	Edgar de León	Forward/center	Puerto Rico	Cariduros de Fajardo
1991	James Carter	Guard	Puerto Rico	Brujos de Guayama
1992	Frantz Volcy	Forward	Haiti	Atléticos de San Germán
1993	Mario "Quijote" Morales (4)	Forward	Puerto Rico	Mets de Guaynabo
1994	James Carter (2)	Guard	Puerto Rico	Brujos de Guayama
1995	Bobby Ríos	Guard	Puerto Rico	Leones de Ponce
1996	Luis Allende	Forward	Puerto Rico	Criollos de Caguas
1997	Eddie Casiano	Guard	Puerto Rico	Atléticos de San Germán
1998	Javier "Tonito" Colon	Guard	Puerto Rico	Leones de Ponce
1999	Tony Farmer	Forward/center	United States	Leones de Ponce
2000	Ian Lockhart	Forward	Bahamas	Piratas de Quebradillas
2001	Monty Wilson	Guard	United States	Polluelos de Aibonito
2002	José Ortiz	Forward/center	Puerto Rico	Cangrejeros de Santurce
2003	Carlos Escalera	Guard	Puerto Rico	Maratonistas de Coamo
2004	Christian Dalmau	Guard	Puerto Rico	Atléticos de San Germán
2005	Bobby Joe Hatton	Guard	Puerto Rico	Leones de Ponce
2006	Wilfredo Pagán	Guard	Puerto Rico	Brujos de Guayama
2007	Angelo Reyes	Forward	Puerto Rico	Gigantes de Carolina
2008	Ánsel Guzmán	Guard	Puerto Rico	Grises de Humacao
2009	Jesse Pellot	Guard	United States	Atléticos de San Germán
2010	Christian Dalmau (2)	Guard	Puerto Rico	Vaqueros de Bayamón
2011	Christian Dalmau (3)	Guard	Puerto Rico	Vaqueros de Bayamón
2012	Donta Smith	Forward	United States; Venezuela	Indios de Mayagüez
2013	Mike Harris	Forward	United States	Leones de Ponce
2014	Walter Hodge	Guard	Puerto Rico; U.S. Virgin Islands	Capitanes de Arecibo
2015	Peter John Ramos	Center	Puerto Rico	Brujos de Guayama
2016	Ángel Daniel Vassallo	Forward	Puerto Rico	Leones de Ponce
2017	Gary Browne	Guard	Puerto Rico	Atléticos de San Germán
2018	Reyshawn Terry	Forward	United States	Piratas de Quebradillas
2019	Brian Conklin	Forward	United States	Piratas de Quebradillas; Indios de Mayagüez
2020	Paris Bass	Forward	United States	Atléticos de San Germán
2021	Ángel Rodríguez	Guard	Puerto Rico	Vaqueros de Bayamón
2022	Walter Hodge (2)	Guard	Puerto Rico; U.S. Virgin Islands	Capitanes de Arecibo
2023	Brandon Knight	Guard	United States	Piratas de Quebradillas
2024	Travis Trice	Guard	United States	Criollos de Caguas
2025	Emmanuel Mudiay	Guard	DRC	Piratas de Quebradillas
2026	Travis Trice (2)	Guard	United States	Criollos de Caguas

== Multi-time winners ==
Rank	Player	Team(s)	Awards	Years
1	(Puerto Rico) Juan "Pachín" Vicéns	Leones de Ponce	4	1952, 1954, 1958, 1960
1	(Puerto Rico) Teófilo Cruz	Cangrejeros de Santurce	4	1962, 1967, 1970, 1971
1	(Puerto Rico) Mario "Quijote" Morales	Mets de Guaynabo	4	1980, 1982, 1983, 1993
4	(Puerto Rico) Juan Báez	Cardenales de Río Piedras	3	1957, 1963, 1964
4	(Puerto Rico) Raymond Dalmau	Piratas de Quebradillas	3	1968, 1969, 1972
4	(Puerto Rico) Georgie Torres	Cariduros de Fajardo	3	1984, 1985, 1986
4	(Puerto Rico) Christian Dalmau	Atléticos de San Germán (1) / Vaqueros de Bayamón (2)	3	2004, 2010, 2011
8	(Puerto Rico) Raúl "Tinajón" Feliciano	Gallitos de la UPR (1) / Cardenales de Río Piedras (1)	2	1951, 1955
8	(Puerto Rico) Rolando Frazer	Polluelos de Aibonito	2	1981, 1987
8	(Puerto Rico) James Carter	Brujos de Guayama	2	1991, 1994
8	(United States Virgin Islands) Walter Hodge	Capitanes de Arecibo	2	2014, 2022
8	(United States) Travis Trice	Criollos de Caguas	2	2024, 2026

== See also ==
- Baloncesto Superior Nacional (BSN)
- List of BSN champions
