= Mario Morales =

Puerto Rican basketball player (born 1957)

Personal information
- Born: November 13, 1957 (age 69)
- Listed height: 6 ft 5 in (1.96 m)
- Listed weight: 200 lb (91 kg)

Career information
- Playing career: 1975–1998
- Position: Forward

Career history
- 1975–1976: Cangrejeros de Santurce
- 1977–1998: Mets de Guaynabo

Career highlights
- 3× BSN champion (1980, 1982, 1989); 4× BSN Most Valuable Player (1980, 1982, 1983, 1993); 2× BSN Scoring champion (1980, 1993); BSN Rookie of the Year (1975); No. 15 retired by Mets de Guaynabo
Medals
Men's basketball
Representing Puerto Rico
Pan American Games
Silver medal – second place	1979 San Juan	Team

Mario Morales Micheo (born November 13, 1957) is a Puerto Rican former professional basketball player, widely regarded as one of the greatest talents in the history of Puerto Rico's Baloncesto Superior Nacional (BSN). Nicknamed "Quijote" for his ability to excel in both scoring and leading teams to championships, Morales had a distinguished 24–season career in the BSN, primarily with the Cangrejeros de Santurce and the Mets de Guaynabo.

Morales began his professional career in 1974 with the Cangrejeros de Santurce at age 17, while still in high school, and was named the BSN Rookie of the Year in 1975. He went on to become a four-time BSN Most Valuable Player (1980, 1982, 1983, 1993), a record shared with Juan "Pachín" Vicéns and Teófilo Cruz. Morales led the Mets de Guaynabo to three BSN championships (1980, 1982, 1989) and amassed 15,293 career points, making him the second-highest scorer in BSN history at the time of his retirement in 1998, behind only Georgie Torres. He also contributed to the team's silver medal at the 1979 Pan American Games in San Juan.

Internationally, Morales represented Puerto Rico in two Olympic Games (1988 Seoul and 1992 Barcelona), showcasing his skills on a global stage. After a brief stint playing college basketball for the Villanova Wildcats in the 1975–76 season, where he averaged 4.7 points and 1.5 rebounds, he returned to Puerto Rico to focus on his professional career due to language challenges.

Following his retirement in 1998, the Guaynabo Mets Pavilion was renamed the Mario Quijote Morales Coliseum in his honor, and a large painting of him in a Mets uniform adorns its entrance.

== Biography ==
=== Early Career and BSN Beginnings ===
Morales began his professional career in 1974 at age 17 with the Cangrejeros de Santurce in the BSN, while still attending Colegio De La Salle in Bayamón, Puerto Rico. His debut showcased his potential, and in 1975, he was named the BSN Rookie of the Year, a testament to his immediate impact. Morales’ early years with Santurce established him as a rising star, capable of competing against seasoned professionals despite his youth.

=== College Stint at Villanova ===
In the 1975–76 season, Morales briefly attended Villanova University in the United States, playing for the Wildcats men’s basketball team. He averaged 4.7 points and 1.5 rebounds per game, contributing to a 16–11 team record. Language barriers and personal reasons prompted his return to Puerto Rico after one season, forgoing a potential path to the NBA to focus on his professional career in the BSN.

=== Dominance with the Mets de Guaynabo ===
In 1976, the Cangrejeros relocated to Guaynabo and became the Mets de Guaynabo, where Morales would spend the majority of his career. Alongside his brother-in-law Federico "Fico" López, he transformed the Mets into a powerhouse during the 1980s. Morales led the team to three BSN championships (1980, 1982, 1989) and eight finals appearances. His scoring ability and clutch performances earned him four BSN Most Valuable Player awards (1980, 1982, 1983, 1993), tying the record with legends Juan "Pachín" Vicéns and Teófilo Cruz. Over his career, Morales amassed 15,293 points, making him the second-highest scorer in BSN history at the time of his retirement in 1998, behind only Georgie Torres.

=== International career ===
Morales joined Puerto Rico’s national basketball team in 1978, representing the island in numerous international competitions. He competed in two Olympic Games—Seoul 1988 and Barcelona 1992—where his skills impressed global audiences. Notably, he contributed to Puerto Rico’s silver medal at the 1979 Pan American Games in San Juan. Morales missed earlier Olympics due to age restrictions (1976), Puerto Rico’s boycott of the 1980 Moscow Games, and the team’s failure to qualify in 1984. His international tenure solidified his reputation as a versatile and competitive player on the world stage.

=== Retirement ===
After he retired, the coliseum where he played for most of his career, Guaynabo's Mets Pavilion, was renamed the Mario Quijote Morales Coliseum. There is a large painting of him in a Guaynabo Mets uniform just to the entrance of the coliseum. Pfizer made Morales a spokesperson for Viagra in 2004.

=== Legal troubles ===
On 4 June 2016, the Puerto Rico Police charged Morales with driving under the influence. An alcohol test showed he had an alcohol level of 0.17 percent, the maximum legal level in Puerto Rico being 0.08 percent.

== Career statistics ==
Category	Details
BSN Career (1974–1998)
Teams	Cangrejeros de Santurce (1974–1975), Mets de Guaynabo (1976–1998)
Total Points	15,293 (2nd all-time in BSN history at retirement)
Seasons Played	24
Championships	3 (1980, 1982, 1989 with Mets de Guaynabo)
Most Valuable Player Awards	4 (1980, 1982, 1983, 1993) – Tied for BSN record
Rookie of the Year	1975 (Cangrejeros de Santurce)
Notable Scoring Rank	Surpassed by Georgie Torres (15,863 points) as BSN’s all-time leading scorer
Villanova College (1975–76)
Games Played	27
Points Per Game	4.7
Rebounds Per Game	1.5
Team record	16–11
International Career
Olympic Appearances	2 (1988 Seoul, 1992 Barcelona)
Pan American Games	Silver Medal (1979, San Juan)

== See also ==
- List of Puerto Ricans – Sports
- Teófilo Cruz
- Raymond Dalmau
