= Carlos Escalera =

Puerto Rican basketball player (born 1979)

Carlos L. Escalera
Personal information
- Born: June 26, 1979 Mayagüez, Puerto Rico
- Listed height: 6 ft 3 in (1.91 m)
- Listed weight: 210 lb (95 kg)

Career information
- College: MSSU
- NBA draft: 2004: undrafted
- Playing career: 2006–present
- Position: Shooting guard

Career highlights
- BSN Most Valuable Player (2003)

Carlos Escalera (born June 26, 1979 in Mayagüez) is a Puerto Rican professional basketball player. Escalera has played in the American Basketball Association (ABA) and the National Superior Basketball League of Puerto Rico (BSN) with Mets de Guaynabo, Taínos de Mayagüez, Aguadilla Tiburones, Maratonistas de Coamo, and Vaqueros de Bayamón and Capitanes de Arecibo.

== Brief Biography ==
Escalera studied at the Bayamon Military Academy in Bayamón, Puerto Rico. Escalera played in the National Superior Basketball League of Puerto Rico since 1997. In 2003 he was the Most Valuable Player for the BSN averaging 25.4 PPG, 4.2 RPG, and 2.9 APG for the Coamo Marathon Runners. For the past six years in Puerto Rico, he has averaged over 17 points per game. In four of those seasons, he shot over 50 percent from the field.

Escalera, scored 42 points in the Miami Tropics first-ever game in the ABA.

Escalera is the half-brother of former University of Miami star Guillermo Diaz.
