= Thordsen =

Thordsen is a surname. Notable people with the surname include:

- Harold Thordsen (1907–1999), American politician, police officer, and football player, brother of Kelly
- Jakob Thordsen (born 1999), German sprint canoeist
- Jimmy Thordsen (born 1948), Puerto Rican Olympic baseball player
- Kelly Thordsen (1917–1978), American actor, brother of Harold
- William George Thordsen (1879–1932), United States Navy sailor awarded the Medal of Honor
