= Rafael Valle =

Puerto Rican basketball player (1938–2024)

Rafael Valle González (March 1, 1938 – January 2, 2024) was a Puerto Rican professional basketball player. In the 1950s and 1960s, he played with the Cangrejeros de Santurce and the Santos de San Juan teams in the Baloncesto Superior Nacional.

During that time, Valle was also a member of the Puerto Rican national basketball team, leading the team to a 13th place at the 1960 Summer Olympics in Rome, where he scored 127 points in seven games. In 1956, he was the highest scorer of the league, with 693 points in 24 games, for an average of 28.5 points per game.

In 2008, Valle was selected as one of the 12 best players in Puerto Rican basketball history between 1920 and 1969. In an interview, Coach Flor Meléndez picked Valle as part of his all-time Puerto Rican starting five in the power forward position along with PG. Pachín Vicens, SG. Neftalí Rivera, SF. Raymond Dalmau, C. José ‘Piculín’ Ortiz.

Valle was 1.93 m tall and weighed 91 kg. He died on January 2, 2024, aged 85.
