= Tomás Gutiérrez (basketball) =

Puerto Rican basketball player

Tomás Gutiérrez Ferrer (29 December 1940 in Guayama, Puerto Rico – 2 February 2018 in Guayama, Puerto Rico) was a Puerto Rican basketball player who competed in the 1964 Summer Olympics and in the 1968 Summer Olympics.

In 1961, Gutiérrez won the BSN Most Valuable Player Award as he led the Leones de Ponce to a championship.
