= Juan Báez =

Puerto Rican basketball player (1935–2022)

Personal information
- Born: April 14, 1935 Santurce, Puerto Rico
- Died: January 26, 2022 (age 86)

Career information
- Playing career: 1953–1969
- Position: Center

Career history
- 1953–1957: Cardenales de Río Piedras
- 1957–1961: Real Madrid
- 1962–1969: Cardenales de Río Piedras

Career highlights
- 2× BSN Most Valuable Player (1957, 1963); 2× Spanish League Top Scorer (1959, 1960)

Juan Báez (April 14, 1935 – January 26, 2022), also known as "Johnny" and "El Indio de la Vía", was a Puerto Rican basketball player. He played from 1953 to 1969 in Puerto Rico's Superior Basketball League and from 1957 to 1961 with the Real Madrid basketball Spanish basketball team in Europe. In 1957, Báez was named the league's Most Valuable Player (MVP) and points leader. In 2007, Báez was awarded Puerto Rico's top sports award, the Puerto Rico Olympic Medal of Honor. Báez was also inducted into Puerto Rico's Sports Hall of Fame.

== Early life ==
Báez (birth name: Juan Ramón Báez Mauriño) was the sixth child of nine children born to Andrés Báez and Sisa Mariño in San Juan, Puerto Rico. He received his primary education at the University of Puerto Rico Model Elementary School. It was in Modelo School where he would learn to play basketball under the guidance of his physical education teacher Lilliam Colberg. During his high school years, he would frequently attend the local Superior Leagues basketball games and participated as a basketball player in minor leagues where he continued to learn the discipline of the game.

== Río Piedras Cardinals basketball team ==
In 1953, the "Cardenales de Río Piedras" (Río Piedras Cardinals) basketball team of Puerto Rico's Superior Basketball League selected him. Even though his active participation was minimal, Báez was promoted to the team's starting lineup in his third game. From 1955 to 1957, the Cardinals won three consecutive championships. In 1957, Báez was named the league's MVP (Most Valuable Player) and points leader. He scored a total of 394 points in 16 games.

His participation in the island's local basketball league was very limited in 1958 and 1959 because he continued to pursue his education in Madrid, Spain. During his stay in Spain, he played from 1957 to 1961 for the Real Madrid basketball team that won the "Generalísimo" Cup, now known as the King's Cup. While playing in Spain, he caught the eye of a young royal whose grandfather was the owner of the Real Madrid team. This royal, now known as King Juan Carlos, would become one of his best-known fans and fostered a relationship that extended past his playing days with King Juan Carlos corresponding with Báez in 2006 to wish him a speedy recovery from his illness. Báez represented Puerto Rico in the 1959 Pan American Games, celebrated in Chicago, Illinois. In the tournament which included American basketball stars Oscar Robertson and Jerry West, Báez was the top scorer. Báez and fellow Puerto Rican Juan "Pachín" Vicéns were named to the All-Star team.

In 1962 he withdrew from Spanish basketball. One year later, in 1963, Báez led the Cardinals to another championship and was once again named MVP. On June 13, 1969, the same year that he retired, he scored his 5000th point during a game against the Piratas de Quebradillas (The Pirates of Quebradillas) with a "jump shot" in the beginning of the game's first quarter. After retiring Báez dedicated most of his time as coach of several local teams.

== Puerto Rico Olympic Medal of Honor ==
On January 20, 2007, several top International Basketball Federation (FIBA) officials traveled to the island to honor Báez. A high-profile ceremony ensued, attended by the likes of the Mayor of San Juan Jorge Santini, Puerto Rico Senate President Kenneth McClintock, Puerto Rico Olympic Committee President Hector Cardona, PR Sports and Recreation Secretary David "Kike" Bernier. Additionally, his wife Irma and his son and daughter, Carlos and Irma, were present. They bestowed upon Báez Puerto Rico's top sports award, the Puerto Rico Olympic Medal of Honor. Báez was also inducted into Puerto Rico's Sports Hall of Fame.

== Personal life and death ==
Báez was married to Irma Hernáiz, his wife of 44 years with whom he had three children. On March 8, 2006, he had an accident and suffered from a delicate neurological condition which left him paralyzed from the waist-down. Báez died from a heart attack on January 26, 2022, at the age of 86.

== Honors ==
"Champion Scorer in the Superior National Basketball League"
Year	Games played	Points scored	percentile
1961	21	492	23.4
1964	21	523	24.9

== See also ==
- List of Puerto Ricans
- Sports in Puerto Rico
- BSN Most Valuable Player Award
