= Indios de Mayagüez (basketball) =

Puerto Rican basketball team

- Nickname: Sultana del Oeste (Sultan of the West); La Tribu (The Tribe)
- League: BSN
- Founded: 1956
- History: Indios de Mayagüez (1956–1989, 1994-present) Taínos de Cabo Rojo (1989-1993)
- Arena: Palacio de Recreación y Deportes
- Capacity: 5,500
- Location: Mayagüez, Puerto Rico
- Team colors: Cream, forest green, red
- Head coach: Iván Vélez
- Ownership: Dion New
- Championships: 1 (2012)
- Website: Official website
Home	Away	Third
Fourth

Indios de Mayagüez are a Puerto Rican professional basketball team, playing in the Baloncesto Superior Nacional (BSN). The Indios play their home games in the Palacio de Recreación y Deportes since 1981. The franchise first entered the league in 1956, and Mayagüez has been its home city for all but five of the team's active seasons given that the franchise has gone through several hiatuses in its history. Along with the Atléticos de San Germán, the Indians have been the only BSN team permanently based in the western part of Puerto Rico, after the Tiburones de Aguadilla relocated to Santurce and became the Cangrejeros de Santurce in 1998.

The team has advanced to the BSN Finals only once, winning the 2012 season championship over the Capitanes de Arecibo with a record of 22–8 after having just made the playoffs for the first time in franchise history in 2009. The team has qualified for the playoffs in 3 seasons of their 59-year existence.

== History ==
After a failed first attempt during the 1956 and 1957 seasons, Mayagüez has had a BSN franchise since 1972. With hiatuses between 1958 and 1971, 1997 and finally during the 2005 and 2006 seasons.

=== First attempt ===
The City of Mayagüez had its first BSN franchise 1956 where José E. Arraras (who in 2000, would end up owning the team) was a player. In 1957 Eddie Lojo joined a team that also had the "Marvelous Blondie" (rubio maravilloso) Jaime Frontera and Pedro ‘Golo’ Laracuente, his first season in the league and the only one with Mayagüez. Rafael ‘Bolote’ Selosse was the head coach. Gabriel Castro Rivera, known for the ‘Los Indios de mi Pueblo’ program, was a co-owner along with William Navas and Mario Quintero. Between 1958 and 1971 Mayagüez entered its first hiatus as a franchise, returning to the league in 1972.

=== A solid team 1972–1982 ===
By that year, the team owners were, Segismundo López and Enrique ‘Chino’ Vázquez Báez, the team played in the gymnasium/coliseum of the University of Puerto Rico at Mayagüez (RUM) until 1980. The 1972 roster included such legendary figures as Eugenio ‘Geño’ Borrero (72-79), John Burgos, José ‘Cheo’ Mangual (72–77 and 79–83) and ponceño Tomas ‘Guabina’ Gutiérrez. In 1973 Andrés ‘Conga’ Cepeda (73–80), ‘Piro’ Cabrera and Jack Allison arrived. The 1974 roster included Víctor Secuola and Ralph Menar and in 1975 José (Joe) Pacheco, was the best scorer of the team equipo with 18PPG. Pacheco only played for Mayagüez that year (beforehand he had played for the Ponce Lions, Caguas and the Bayamón Cowboys). In 1976, Alex Vega, Cesar Fantauzzi (76–77), Elket Forbes (76,77,81) and Diego Meléndez (76, 81 y 82 with Mayagüez) arrived and took the quintet's offense along with Menar. Yamil Brunet (76–77) was there for two seasons and Alex Vega (76–82) played with Mayagüez for seven seasons.

In 1977, the new team stars were Nelson Richardson and Dino Robertson. Robertson (77-78) only played two seasons in the league, both for Mayagüez, and averaged 24 PPG. Richardson played in Mayagüez for 5 seasons (77-81). During the 1978 season, the roster was intact, only with Secuola's return who was with Mayagüez on three occasions (74, 78, 80). The 1979 season saw the team adding locals, José ‘Gorilon’ Alicea (79–83) and Rubén Bayron (79–81). In 1980 the approval of the entrance of players from other Latin American countries into the BSN made possible the hiring of Dominican Frank Prats, who only played for two seasons (80 and 82). The 1980s brought many legendary figures near the end of their careers to Mayagüez. Among them were the great Teófilo ‘Teo’ Cruz, who played for "the tribe" between 1981 and 1982, when he retired from basketball and Héctor ‘El Mago’ Blondet who wore the "taíno" uniform during the 1981 season. The 1981 season also had Jaime Rivera, Rolando Alvarez, Noel Martin and Pete Aguilar (81–83). This season was filled with many high expectations from the fans as the team signed various veteran starting players and moved into the Sports and Recreation Palace. After losing their first three games, the team fired their American coach and Radio reporter Johnny Flores, who worked as assistant coach took the job, achieving 6 consecutive victories and becoming a sensation, until Mayaguez confronted the league-leading Ponce Lions when a fight broke out between the teams and the referees had to suspend play and five players from "the tribe", ending the team's hopes for the rest of the season. In 1982 Juan ‘Conejo’ Rosas and Juan Alverio (82–86 and 90) arrived in what was Mario Henry Rodriguez's last year with the team. Rodríguez had been playing with the team for eight seasons (75–82).

=== Glory Days 1983–1988 ===
With Dr. Ariel Rojas Davis, Eudaldo Báez Cruz and Dr. Iván Martínez Deliz as club owners, 1983 saw the arrival of Vicente Ithier (83-88 and 90 in Cabo Rojo), Gerry Ocasio (83–87), Bradley Pacheco (83 y 84) and Eddie Torres (1983). A year later (1984) Mexican-American Julio Gallardo (84–87 and 89 in Cabo Rojo) arrived, Germán Hernández (85 y 86) and Manny Figueroa (one season) would arrive in 1985. In 1986 Richard Soto (86–93) a humble but always effective center arrived. Mike Santos wore Mayaguez's uniform in 1986 and 87. In 1987 four new players entered the club (Pedro Albizu, Raymond de Jesús, Mitchell and Gerald Lebrón). De Jesús would stay the longest with the team, playing for six seasons (87–92). In ‘88’ Gustavo Santos and Frank Memoli (88–89) arrived.

=== Relocation to Cabo Rojo ===
Disagreements in the rental fee of the Recreation Palace with the Municipal Administration of Mayaguez forced club directors to relocate the team south to the neighboring town of Cabo Rojo and the team became the Taínos de Cabo Rojo. The 1989 season starred played as Raymond De Jesús, Richard Soto, Memoli and ‘Gus’ Santos. In 1990, Ian Lockhart (90–92 and 2007) and Ramón ‘Rayo’ Rivera (90–93) arrived. In 1991 Tony Echevarría (89–93) became a stellar player as he was tall, good but undisciplined. Only for the 1992 season Reyes Ortiz joined the team. In 1993 the Bocachica brothers, Johnny ‘El Diablo’ Caraballo and Marcus Webb arrived. These coaches while the club was in Cabo Rojo were Johnny Flores, ‘Paquin’ Abreu, Rick Shore and Don Silveri.

=== Return to Mayagüez 1994–1999 ===
In the year 1994, the team moved back to Mayagüez and became the Taínos de Mayagüez. They presented a club led by Aguadillan Jorge Medrano, former Cowboy Alberto Montañéz (94 y 95), Jorge Rivera, ‘Mandy’, Cesar Bocachica and Franklin Román (94 and 98), among others. In 1995 Edwin Pellot wore the uniform of Mayagüez as also did Joel Quiñones (95, 96, 2009 and 2010). In '96' came Geno Soto (96, 2000, 01). That year the Tainos had a great reinforcement in Anthony Douglas. In 1997 the franchise took a season hiatus and returned for the 1998 season, which starred Carlos Escaleea, John Cotte and in which Matt Nover was also a productive player.

In 1999, with Jose E. Arraras as club owner, Fernando Ortiz and Christian Dalmau arrived (later Damon Santiago and Gerardo Zayas would arrive in a controversial trade with San Germán for Dalmau). T.L. Latson (99–2004) and Guillermo ‘Panamá’ Meyer helped the cause for many years. During that time, Alfred "Butch" Lee Edgardo Vechio and ‘Pito’ Vargas coached the team

=== 2000s ===
By 2001, team owner Don Luis Falto began to invest large amounts of money without skimping on expenses and brought to Mayagüez the best players and leaders available (Edgardo Vechio, ‘Butch’ Lee, Flor Meléndez). This good-willed experiment didn't work as it was a very talented team but lacked discipline (Andrés Guibert, Lázaro Borrel, Orlando Vega, Tyler Brown, James Carter, Elmyr García, Freddie Martínez, Ferdinand Morales, Michelo Dávila, Josué Nieves, Leroy Jackson, Joe Murray, Gary Joe Burgos, Puruco Latimer, Lee Benson, Bimbo Carmona and Ricardo Dalmau. Most of them were veterans who had already seen the best of their careers. It's worth noting that during this time Mayagüez also signed the best prospects of the decade: José Juan Barea, Alexander Galindo, Jesus Verdejo, Felix Davila y Samuel Hernandez, who became reserve players for the team because the NCAA changed its eligibility rules with respect to Puerto Rican players who formed part of the BSN as well as the NCAA. This experiment lasted until yet another hiatus in 2005 and 2006. During the hiatus, the franchise forgot to send his roster of players to the league, losing the booking fees on all players, including the college reserves. The franchise returned to the league in 2007, near the point of dissolving. It had several problems with coaches Wigberto Quintana, Gabi Miranda, Manolo Cintron and Omar González. Keenan Jourdon (2007–10) became the team leader. That year Giovanni Jiménez (2007–present) as well as cubans Ángel Caballero y Roberto Herrera arrived and performed well. In 2008 Eddie Casiano, former Puerto Rico national team member, retires as player, succumbing to the many lesions. In 2009, their first season under owner Luis Vargas and Eddie Casiano as head coach, they reached their first semi finals in franchise history. They lost to eventual the eventual BSN champions, the Bayamón Cowboys in the semi-final series 4–2. That year, Luis Vargas won the Owner of the Year Award and Eddie Casiano won the Coach of the Year Award.

=== The road to the championship 2010–2011 ===
In 2010, Mayagüez started the season 0–10 due in part to injuries to key players, including a season-ending injury to their captain, Giovanni Jimenez. Their first win of the season came April, 3rd 2010 against fellow rivals, the San Germán Athletics in a game played at the Rebekah Colberg Coliseum in Cabo Rojo. The game ended 87–83 in a win for Mayagüez. The Indios finished the season with a 7–22 mark, one of their worst in franchise history.

During the 2011 season, Mayagüez were determined to turn things around and forget their horrendous 2010 season. They signed Venezuela's national team player, Héctor "Pepito" Romero as their key addition. Also added were some role players such as Eric Rodríguez and Héctor Valenzuela during the off season. They selected Carlos Rivera from a special draft from Leones de Ponce and former Siena player Edwin Ubiles in the BSN's new players Draft. Their key loss was townsman Alex Galindo, to the Gallitos de Isabela.

Mayagüez started the 2011 season with two losses to the Piratas de Quebradillas and the Gallitos de Isabela. Their struggles continued, but in their third game of the season, played at the Palacio de Recreación y Deportes, they finally got their first win of the season, against power house Santurce Crabbers by a final score of 80–68 to the delight of fans in attendance. By mid season, Mayagüez would again confront problems with Héctor Romero (knee injury) and Herve Laminaza (family problems). The team then signed Dwayne Jones, Sean Williams, Lee Nailon and Brandon Robinson to substitute these players. Mayagüez would be in race for the eighth and final spot of the playoffs but the team had two games confiscated and reschedule to be replayed because of an ineligible player change for Herve Laminaza. The league ruled that the substitution of Lee Nailon for Herve Laminaza surpassed the team's maximum player change and ruled that the games played by Nailon had to be played again. This determination was devastating for the team's aspirations for the playoffs as they lost one of those two games with the Piratas de Quebradillas and the team fell short by two games to make it to the playoffs for the second time in three seasons. Mayagüez finished with a 10–20 record in 2011.

=== Champions ===
During the 2012 season, Mayagüez would begin the season with only 9 players signed. The Puerto Rican press had put them as the worst team in the BSN League. With no major stars in the team, Eddie Casiano, who won the Mexican League Championship earlier in the year with Halcones Rojos Veracruz, would be optimistic about these team's players. Their first meeting of the season was against the defending back-to-back BSN champions, the Arecibo Captains. Everyone predicted a blowout win for Arecibo, but Mayagüez shocked the champions and ruined their opening game celebrations with an 80–70 win.

The Indios started the season 2-0, before falling to the Bayamón Cowboys on March, 6 (90-83). After blowing an 11-point lead going into the fourth quarter with Guaynabo on March 9, 2012 for a 95–94 loss, Mayagüez won three straight to put their record at 5–2. Another loss to Bayamón on March 17, 2012 dropped them to 5–3. The Indios then went on an 8-game winning streak, the longest for any team that season to obtained the first position on the standing with a 13–3 mark. Their rivals and fellow neighbors the San Germán Athletics beat Mayagüez on April 7, 2012 87–79 stopping the Indios' 8-game winning streak.

Another three-game winning streak put the Indios' record at 16-4. Another showdown against San Germán on April 16, 2012 marked the worst loss of the season for the Indios de Mayagüez, a 107–75 loss at the Palacio de Recreación y Deportes Coliseum of Mayagüez, dropping their record to 16-5. After a loss to Guayama on April 19, 2012, Mayagüez won three straight games.

On June 8, 2012, they defeated Arecibo 72–61 in Game 5 of the Finals to win their first BSN Championship in team history.

Since then the team has been one of the lesser teams in the league. A failed attempt a Jose Juan Barea being their coach in 2017 placed the team into a downward spiral even forcing a recession in 2018. They returned in 2019 and had a middling season even if they had the MVP Brian Conklin in their roster. After that they kept having losing seasons until 2025 where they actually became a number one seed and won their first series since 2025, it coincidentally being the Capitanes de Arecibo whom they beat, then losing in 6 versus the Leones de Ponce. The following season began with an unexpected sale to former Piratas de Quebradillas owner Dion New. They had a disappointing 13-21 season where relocation rumors began surfacing. On September 18 the insider Mr. Krossover published that their owner had filled for relocation to Isabela later being confirmed by the league itself. For now the team still exists, but with an 8-4 vote the team could disappear and become the Gallitos de Isabela.

== Home arena ==
- Palacio de Recreación y Deportes (1981–present)
- Coliseo Rebekah Colberg Cabrera (1989-1993)

== Players ==
=== Current roster ===
Note: Flags indicate national team eligibility at FIBA-sanctioned events. Players may hold other non-FIBA nationalities not displayed.

Indios de Mayagüez roster
Players
Coaches

Pos.	No.	Nat.	Name	Ht.	Wt.	Age
F	0	(Puerto Rico)	Camacho, Bradley	6 ft 7 in (2.01 m)	210 lb (95 kg)	24 – 2 May 2002
PF	1	(Puerto Rico)	Erazo, Josué	6 ft 8 in (2.03 m)	215 lb (98 kg)	31 – 7 April 1995
G	6	(Puerto Rico)	Gaiter, Isiah	6 ft 4 in (1.93 m)	192 lb (87 kg)	26 – 5 May 2000
C	10	(Puerto Rico)	López, Carlos 'Yao'	6 ft 11 in (2.11 m)	230 lb (100 kg)	36 – 23 June 1990
G	12	(Puerto Rico)	Álvarez, Neftalí	6 ft 0 in (1.83 m)	185 lb (84 kg)	27 – 20 June 1999
SG	15	(Puerto Rico)	Placer, José	6 ft 2 in (1.88 m)	190 lb (86 kg)	26 – 8 May 2000
SG	29	(Nicaragua) (Puerto Rico)	Ruiz, Jared (DC)	6 ft 2 in (1.88 m)	195 lb (88 kg)	33 – February 20, 1993
F	33	(Puerto Rico)	Cuascut, Luis	6 ft 7 in (2.01 m)	215 lb (98 kg)	28 – 16 August 1998
G		(Dominican Republic) (Puerto Rico)	Liz, Víctor (DC)	6 ft 2 in (1.88 m)	190 lb (86 kg)
G		(United States)	Boyd, Brandon
SG		(United States)	Cambo Jr., Anthony

Head coach

- (Puerto Rico) Iván 'Pipo' Vélez

Assistant coach(es)

- (Puerto Rico) Jeselky Melendez Lopez
- (Puerto Rico) Héctor 'Bobby' Porrata
- (Puerto Rico) Giovanni Jiménez
- (Puerto Rico) Fernando Casablanca

Legend

- (C) Team captain
- (DC) Dual citizenship
- (I) Import player
- Injured

- Roster
Updated: 6 November 2026

=== Depth chart ===
Pos.	Starting 5	Bench 1	Bench 2
C		Luis Cuascut	Carlos 'Yao' López
PF	Josué Erazo		Bradley Camacho
SF		Jared Ruiz
SG		Isiah Gaiter	José Placer
PG		Neftalí Álvarez

== Notable players ==
Note: Flags indicate national team eligibility at FIBA-sanctioned events. Players may hold other non-FIBA nationalities not displayed.

Criteria

To appear in this section a player must have either:

- Set a club record or won an individual award while at the club
- Played at least one official international match for their national team at any time
- Played at least one official NBA match at any time.

- (Puerto Rico) Jose Alicea Mirabal
- (Puerto Rico) José Juan Barea
- (Puerto Rico) Teófilo Cruz
- (Puerto Rico) Eddie Casiano
- (Cuba) Lazaro Borrell
- (Cuba) Andrés Guibert
- (United States) - (Mexico) Julio Gallardo
- (United States) Josh Powell
- (United States) Terrence Jones
- (Puerto Rico) Jaysean Paige
- (United States) Brianté Weber
- (United States) Tyreke Evans
- (United States Virgin Islands) Carl Krauser
- (United States Virgin Islands) Kevin Hamilton
- (New Zealand) Tyrell Harrison
- (Australia) Nathan Sobey

== See also ==
- Baloncesto Superior Nacional
