= Teófilo Cruz =

Puerto Rican basketball player (1942–2005)

Personal information
- Born: January 8, 1942 Santurce, Puerto Rico
- Died: August 30, 2005 (aged 63) Trujillo Alto, Puerto Rico
- Listed height: 6 ft 9 in (2.06 m)
- Listed weight: 230 lb (104 kg)

Career information
- College: New York University (1961–1962); Seattle University (1962–1965)
- NBA draft: 1965: 6th round, 55th overall pick
- Drafted by: Los Angeles Lakers
- Playing career: 1957–1982
- Position: Center
- Number: 13

Career history
- 1957–1964: Cangrejeros de Santurce
- 1965–1966: Picadero Damm
- 1966–1969: Cangrejeros de Santurce
- 1969–1970: Racing Club Mechelen
- 1970–1976: Cangrejeros de Santurce
- 1977–1978: Indios de Canóvanas
- 1979: Mets de Guaynabo
- 1980: Cardenales de Río Piedras
- 1981–1982: Taínos de Mayagüez

Career highlights
- Olympic Order; FIBA's 50 Greatest Players (1991); 2× BSN champion (1962, 1968); 4× BSN MVP (1962, 1967, 1970, 1971); 4× BSN scoring champion (1960–1962, 1971); 6× BSN Defensive Player of the Year (1964, 1966, 1969–1972); No. 13 retired by Cangrejeros de Santurce
- Stats at Basketball Reference
- FIBA Hall of Fame
Medals
Men's basketball
Representing Puerto Rico
Pan American Games
Silver medal – second place	1959 Chicago
Silver medal – second place	1971 Santiago de Cali
Silver medal – second place	1975 Mexico City

Teófilo "Teo" Cruz Downs (January 8, 1942 – August 30, 2005) was a Puerto Rican professional basketball player. After playing college basketball, Cruz played in Puerto Rico's top-level league, the Baloncesto Superior Nacional (BSN) with Cangrejeros de Santurce, Indios de Canóvanas, Mets de Guaynabo, Cardenales de Río Piedras, and Taínos de Mayagüez. Cruz also played in Spain with Picadero Damm, and in Belgium with Racing Club Mechelen.

Cruz was also a member of the senior Puerto Rican national basketball team, and he represented Puerto Rico in five Summer Olympic Games, from 1960 to 1976, making him the first athlete to do so. On March 1, 2007, he became an International Basketball Federation (FIBA) Hall of Famer.

== College career ==
Cruz played college basketball in the United States. He was originally a member of New York University's NYU Violets (1961–1962), but he transferred to Seattle University, where he was a member of the Seattle Redhawks (1962–1965). After his college career, he was selected with the 55th overall pick of the 1965 NBA draft, by the Los Angeles Lakers.

== Club career ==
Cruz played for 25 seasons in the Baloncesto Superior Nacional (BSN) of Puerto Rico. He was the league's Most Valuable Player 4 times. He was also selected the league's Defensive Player of the Year a record five times. He played with the Santurce Crabbers, Indios de Canóvanas, Mets de Guaynabo, Cardenales de Río Piedras, and Taínos de Mayagüez.

He also led the league in points per game twice, and was the first player ever to reach 9,000 total points scored in the BSN. In total, he scored 9,535 points, for an average of 16.3 points per game. He also grabbed 4,672 total rebounds, for an average of 8.0 rebounds per game. He also had 605 assists, during his twenty-five-year career.

== National team career ==
Cruz was the starting center of the senior Puerto Rican national basketball team, at the times when Puerto Rico and Brazil were the two dominant teams in the FIBA Americas region, excluding the United States. Cruz was the first men's basketball player to compete at five different Summer Olympics. That feat was matched twenty years later by Brazilian player Oscar Schmidt, at the 1996 Summer Olympics, and later by Australian player Andrew Gaze, at the 2000 Summer Olympics, and by Spanish player Juan Carlos Navarro at the 2016 Summer Olympics.

Cruz also played at the 1974 FIBA World Championship, in Puerto Rico, and at numerous Pan American Games and CentroBasket tournaments.

== Awards and accomplishments ==
- 2× Puerto Rican BSN League scoring champion: (1960, 1962)
- 2× Puerto Rican BSN League champion: (1962, 1968)
- 4× Puerto Rican BSN League MVP: (1962, 1967, 1970, 1971)
- 6× Puerto Rican BSN League Defensive Player of the Year: (1964, 1966, 1969–1972)
- Cruz played at 5 Summer Olympic Games. He played at the Rome 1960 Olympics, at the Tokyo 1964 Olympics, at the Mexico 1968 Olympics, at Munich 1972 Olympics, and at the Montreal 1976 Olympics.
- Cruz was named one FIBA's 50 Greatest Players in 1991.
- His number 13 jersey was retired by Cangrejeros de Santurce.
- Olympic Order
- On March 1, 2007, Cruz was inducted into the FIBA Hall of Fame. Along with Bill Russell and Nikos Galis, he was one of the first sixteen players to be inducted into the international Hall of Fame, as he was a part of the first induction class in history.

== Death ==
Cruz died on August 30, 2005, of a brain hemorrhage. After his death, on August 31, 2005, the sports complex in San Juan was named after him, in his honor. Also, before a game between the Puerto Rican and Venezuelan national teams, a moment of silence was held in his memory.

== See also ==
- List of Puerto Ricans
- List of athletes with the most appearances at Olympic Games
