= James Carter (basketball) =

Puerto Rican basketball player

Personal information
- Born: March 27, 1964 (age 62) New York City, New York
- Listed height: 6 ft 0 in (1.83 m)
- Listed weight: 182 lb (83 kg)

Career information
- College: St. Thomas Aquinas
- Playing career: 1987–2006
- Position: Point guard

Career history
- 1987–2001: Brujos de Guayama
- 2001: Indios de Mayagüez
- 2002–2003: Criollos de Caguas
- 2004: Capitanes de Arecibo
- 2005: Maratonistas de Coamo
- 2006: Brujos de Guayama
- 1992-2000: Explosivos de Moca LBP

Career highlights
- 2× BSN Most Valuable Player (1991, 1994)
Medals
Men's basketball
Representing Puerto Rico
Goodwill Games
Gold medal – first place	1994 St. Petersburg	Team competition

James Raymond Carter Gaudino (born March 27, 1964) is a retired Puerto Rican basketball player. Carter spent most of his career as a point guard for the Brujos de Guayama of the Baloncesto Superior Nacional (BSN). Carter is currently the all-time assists leader of the league. During his 20-year career, he also played for the Indios de Mayagüez, Criollos de Caguas, Maratonistas de Coamo, and Capitanes de Arecibo. Carter also played since 1992 to the year 2000 for the Explosivos de Moca of the Liga de Baloncesto Puertorriqueña.

== Professional career ==
Carter led the Brujos de Guayama to the Finals twice in his career (1991 and 1994), losing to the Atléticos de San Germán on both occasions.

Carter was selected as one of the league's best players of the 1990s, along with Eddie Casiano, Javier "Toñito" Colón, Edgar León and José "Piculín" Ortiz.

== National Team career ==
Carter also played for the Puerto Rico National Basketball Team and was one of the members of the team that won the gold medal at the 1994 Goodwill Games in St. Petersburg, Russia.

== Personal life ==
James has a brother, B.J. Carter, who also played at the BSN.

After retiring, Carter has participated in several charity tournaments with other players and celebrities.
