= Jordan Howard (basketball) =

American basketball player (born 1996)

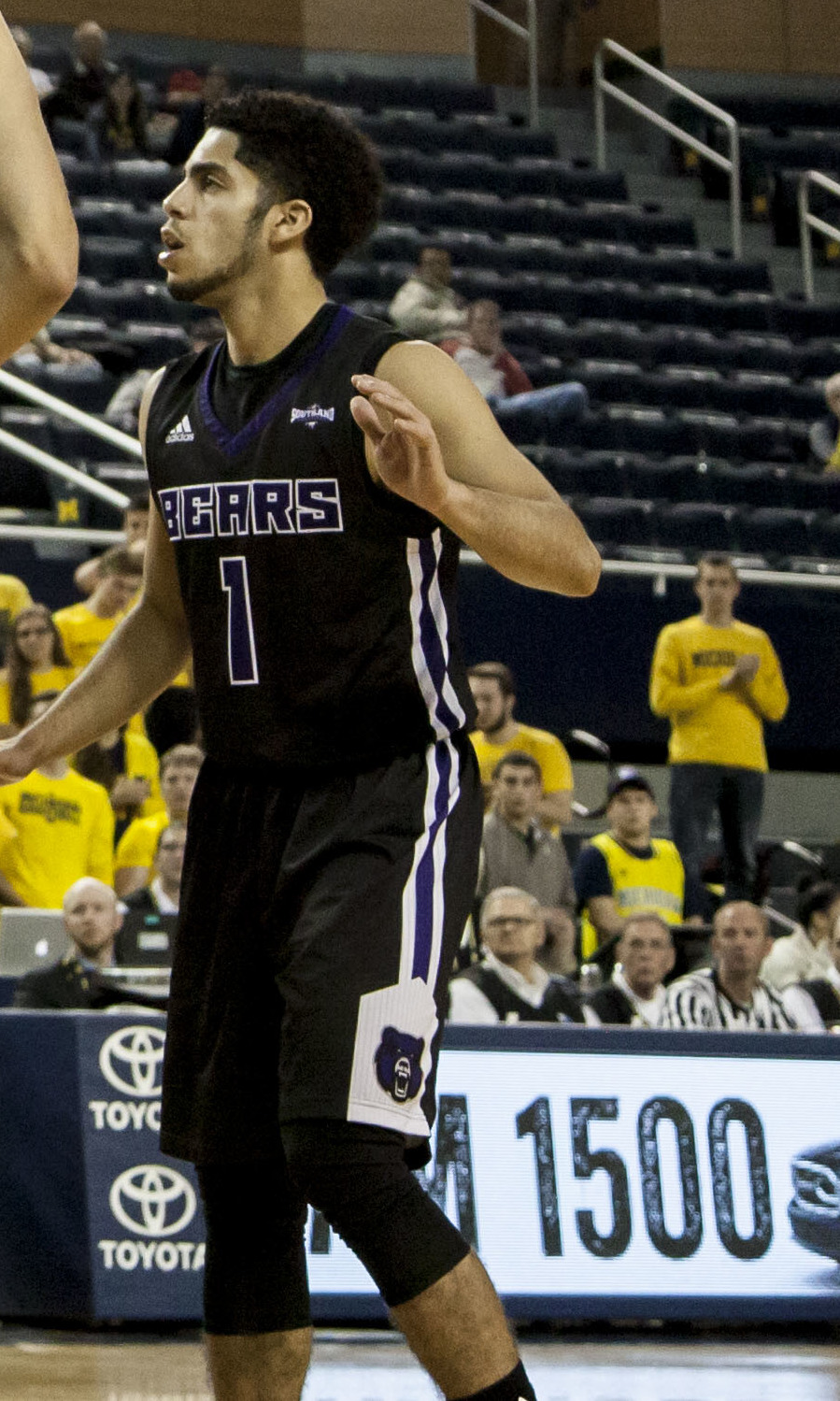
- Howard with the Central Arkansas Bears

No. 8 – Sichuan Blue Whales
- Position: Point guard
- League: CBA

Personal information
- Born: January 6, 1996 (age 30) Morristown, New Jersey, U.S.
- Listed height: 5 ft 11 in (1.80 m)
- Listed weight: 180 lb (82 kg)

Career information
- High school: Perry (Gilbert, Arizona)
- College: Central Arkansas (2014–2018)
- NBA draft: 2018: undrafted
- Playing career: 2018–present

Career history
- 2018: Texas Legends
- 2019: Raptors 905
- 2019: Goyang Orion Orions
- 2020–2021: Brujos de Guayama
- 2021: Mexico City Capitanes
- 2022: SIG Strasbourg
- 2022–2023: Napoli Basket
- 2023–2024: Monbus Obradoiro
- 2024: Osos de Manatí
- 2024–2025: Ningbo Rockets
- 2025: Osos de Manatí
- 2025–2026: Hangzhou Jingwei
- 2026: Cangrejeros de Santurce
- 2026–present: Sichuan Blue Whales

Career highlights
- BSN Rookie of the Year (2020); Southland Player of the Year (2018); 3× First-team All-Southland (2016–2018)

Jordan Isaiah Howard (born January 6, 1996) is a Puerto Rican professional basketball player for the Sichuan Blue Whales of the Chinese Basketball Association (CBA). He played college basketball for Central Arkansas, and is a part of the Puerto Rican national team.

== High school career ==
Howard grew up in Chandler, Arizona and attended Perry High School. He is the son of Chuck Howard, who played college football at Indiana and is currently the corporate wellness administrator at Grand Canyon University. Jordan's older brother, Desmond Howard, played basketball in the junior college ranks and organizes his tenacious workouts. His younger brother, Markus Howard, was a top scorer at Marquette before turning professional. Jordan considered going to Grand Canyon for college, but opted for Central Arkansas instead.

== College career ==
Howard was named Southland Freshman of the Year. He averaged 19.5 points per game as a junior. He had 35 points against UCLA on November 15, 2017, including the three-point bucket to force overtime. He surpassed the 2,000 point mark in a loss to Sam Houston State on January 3, 2018. On January 10, Howard set the Central Arkansas Division I record with a 41-point performance against Incarnate Word. He averaged 25.8 points per game as a senior, third in Division I. Howard is the all-time leader for three-point field goals in the Southland Conference. At the conclusion of the regular season, he was named Southland Player of the Year. Howard was a Third Team Academic All-American and graduated with a degree in filmmaking.

== Professional career ==
After going undrafted in the 2018 NBA draft, Howard signed with the Golden State Warriors for NBA Summer League. He was selected by the Santa Cruz Warriors with the 10th pick in the 2018 NBA G League draft. He was not named to the team's final roster.

On November 25, 2018, Howard signed with the Texas Legends. He was waived on December 17.

On January 4, 2019, Howard was signed by the Raptors 905 from the G League available players pool.

On July 22, 2019, Howard signed with Goyang Orion Orions of the Korean Basketball League. On December 24, he was replaced by Adrian Uter. On January 29, 2020, he signed with the Brujos de Guayama of the Baloncesto Superior Nacional, averaged 18.1 points and 4.1 assists per game. Howard re-signed with the team on October 3, 2021, joining them for the postseason. In the 2021 playoffs he averaged 7.5 points, 1.3 rebounds, and 2.0 assists per game.

On October 26, 2021, Howard signed with the Mexico City Capitanes of the NBA G League. He scored 38 points in a 113–103 loss to the Westchester Knicks on December 22, 2021. Howard averaged 15.4 points per game, shooting 46 percent from three-point range. On February 12, 2022, he signed with SIG Strasbourg of the French LNB Pro A.

On June 18, 2022, Howard signed with Napoli Basket of the Italian Lega Basket Serie A (LBA).

On August 4, 2023, Howard signed with Monbus Obradoiro of the Spanish Liga ACB.

On May 23, 2024, Howard signed with the Osos de Manatí of the Baloncesto Superior Nacional.

On September 15, 2024, Howard signed with the Ningbo Rockets of the Chinese Basketball Association (CBA).

== National team career ==
Howard was selected to represent Puerto Rico on the national team for the qualifier round for the 2023 FIBA Basketball World Cup and in the 2024 Paris Olympics.

== Personal life ==
Howard is of Puerto Rican descent. He is the brother of Saski Baskonia guard Markus Howard. Howard got engaged to his longtime girlfriend, Tay, in June 2024.
