= J. J. Barea =

Puerto Rican basketball player (born 1984)

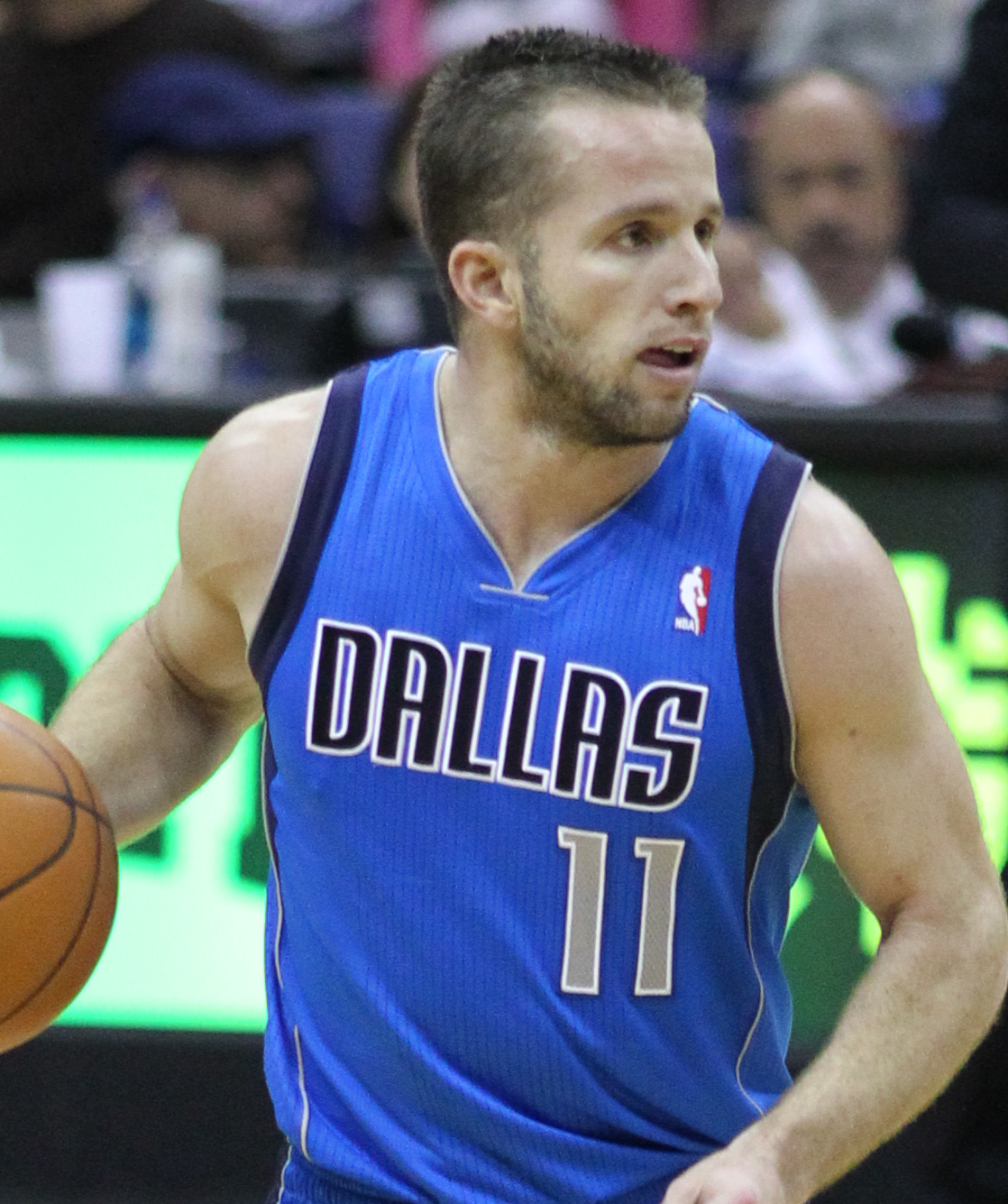
- Barea with the Dallas Mavericks in 2011

Denver Nuggets
- Title: Assistant coach
- League: NBA

Personal information
- Born: June 26, 1984 (age 42) Mayagüez, Puerto Rico
- Listed height: 5 ft 10 in (1.78 m)
- Listed weight: 186 lb (84 kg)

Career information
- College: Northeastern (2002–2006)
- NBA draft: 2006: undrafted
- Playing career: 2001–2022
- Position: Point guard
- Number: 11, 5, 55
- Coaching career: 2017–present

Career history

Playing
- 2001–2002: Indios de Mayagüez
- 2006: Cangrejeros de Santurce
- 2006–2011: Dallas Mavericks
- 2007: →Fort Worth Flyers
- 2011–2014: Minnesota Timberwolves
- 2014–2020: Dallas Mavericks
- 2021: Estudiantes
- 2021–2022: Cangrejeros de Santurce

Coaching
- 2017: Indios de Mayagüez
- 2021: Dallas Mavericks (Player development)
- 2024–2025: Mets de Guaynabo
- 2025–present: Denver Nuggets (assistant)

Career highlights
- NBA champion (2011); 2× Centrobasket MVP (2008, 2016); CAA Player of the Year (2006); First-team All-CAA (2006); 2× First-team All-AEC (2004, 2005); Third-team All-AEC (2003); AEC All-Rookie Team (2003)

Career NBA statistics
- Points: 7,415 (8.9 ppg)
- Rebounds: 1,748 (2.1 rpg)
- Assists: 3,270 (3.9 apg)
- Stats at NBA.com
- Stats at Basketball Reference
Medals
Men's basketball
Representing Puerto Rico
FIBA AmeriCup
Silver medal – second place	2013 Venezuela
Bronze medal – third place	2007 United States
Pan American Games
Gold medal – first place	2011 Guadalajara	Team
Silver medal – second place	2007 Rio de Janeiro	Team
Centrobasket
Gold medal – first place	2008 Mexico
Gold medal – first place	2010 Dominican Republic
Gold medal – first place	2016 Panama
Silver medal – second place	2012 Puerto Rico
Silver medal – second place	2014 Mexico
Central American and Caribbean Games
Gold medal – first place	2006 Cartagena	Team
Gold medal – first place	2010 Mayagüez	Team
FIBA CBC Championship
Gold medal – first place	2007 Puerto Rico
FIBA Americas U20 Championship
Silver medal – second place	2004 Canada

José Juan Barea Mora (born June 26, 1984) is a Puerto Rican basketball coach and former player. He played college basketball for the Northeastern Huskies before joining the Dallas Mavericks in 2006 and becoming the seventh Puerto Rican to play in the NBA. He went on to win an NBA championship with the Mavericks in 2011 before signing with the Minnesota Timberwolves, where he played for the next three seasons before returning to Dallas. He has also played in the NBA Development League and the Baloncesto Superior Nacional.

Barea was a member of the Puerto Rican national team that won the gold medal in the 2006 and 2010 Central American and Caribbean Games. He was the starting point guard for Puerto Rico when they won the gold medal in the 2011 Pan American Games and the silver medal in the 2007 Pan American Games.

Barea served as head coach of Mets de Guaynabo of the Baloncesto Superior Nacional (BSN) in 2024 and 2025.

== Early life ==
Barea was born in the municipality of Mayagüez in the west coast of Puerto Rico in 1984 to parents Marta (née Mora) and Jaime Barea. With a father who was an engineer and a mother who was a retired professor as well as volleyball and tennis coach, he grew up in an upper-middle-class neighborhood of Mayagüez. Barea was a member of Boy Scouts of America Troop 790 for seven years. He graduated from Academia de la Inmaculada Concepción high school.

In 2001, Barea started playing basketball for Indios de Mayagüez of the Baloncesto Superior Nacional (BSN). Later that year, he moved to Florida to attend high school at Miami Christian School in Miami, Florida. As a senior in 2001–02, he averaged 20 points, 6 rebounds, 8 assists, and 3 steals in helping his team to the state title and a 38–2 record. He made a name for himself nationally at the City of Palms event in December 2001 where he was the team's leading scorer and showcased an accurate shot from three-point range. In April 2002, he enrolled at Northeastern University.

After attending Northeastern University, Barea returned to Puerto Rico to rejoin Indios de Mayagüez for the 2002 BSN season; there, he averaged 2.8 points in 14 games.

== College career ==
As a freshman playing for the Northeastern Huskies in 2002–03, Barea earned third-team All-America East Conference (AEC) and AEC All-Rookie team honors, after averaging a conference-leading 17 points to go along with 3 rebounds, 3.9 assists, and 1.9 steals in 28 contests. He became the first freshman in Husky basketball history to record 400 points and 100 assists in a season and accrued a team-high 25 games of scoring in double-figures.

As a sophomore in 2003–04, Barea earned First Team All-America East honors after finishing second in that conference for both scoring (20.7 ppg) and assists (5.8 apg) and becoming the first Husky since Reggie Lewis in 1986–87 to average at least 20 points per game.

As a junior in 2004–05, Barea ranked second in the America East and eighth in the country in scoring (22.2 ppg); he also led the conference and was fifth in the nation in assists (7.3 apg). He later earned first-team All-AEC honors for the second consecutive year. Further, he placed third in assists (218), fourth in three-pointers (68), and sixth in points (665) on Northeastern's single-season charts, and tied the school record with a career-high 41 points against the Stony Brook Seawolves. He was also named a finalist for the illustrious Bob Cousy Award.

As a senior in 2005–06, Barea was named Honorable Mention All-America by The Associated Press, the Player of the Year in the Colonial Athletic Association (CAA), first-team All-CAA, first-team NABC All-District One, and Mid-Major Player of the Year by CollegeInsider.com. He led Northeastern and finished third in the nation in assists (8.4 apg), and he finished 19th in the nation in scoring (21.0 ppg). Barea was yet again named a finalist for the Bob Cousy Award. Barea finished his collegiate career as the school's second all-time leading scorer, with 2,209 points behind Reggie Lewis, and he left Northeastern as its second all-time leader in assists, with 721, and its leader in three-point field goals made (255).

=== Post-college ===
In April 2006, Barea had a productive performance at the Portsmouth Invitational Tournament in Virginia, finishing with averages of 14.0 points, 13.7 assists, and 5.7 rebounds per game in three contests. Barea broke the single-game and single-tournament assist records, as he dished out 18 assists for Beach Barton Ford in a 118–100 victory over Norfolk Sports Club, giving him 41 assists in three games. For his efforts, Barea received the tournament's first Allen Iverson A.I. award, given to the player deemed most important to his team.

== Professional career ==
=== Cangrejeros de Santurce (2006) ===
After the Portsmouth Invitational Tournament, Barea returned to Puerto Rico to join Cangrejeros de Santurce for the 2006 BSN season, where he averaged 10.4 points, 2.7 assists, and 2.8 rebounds over 9 games.

=== Dallas Mavericks (2006–2011) ===
==== 2006–09: early years ====
After going undrafted in the 2006 NBA draft, Barea joined the Golden State Warriors for the 2006 Las Vegas Summer League where in five games, he averaged 6.8 points, 1.8 rebounds, 2.8 assists, and 2 steals in 21.4 minutes per contest. He then joined the Dallas Mavericks for the Rocky Mountain Revue where in three games, he averaged 12.0 points, 1.7 rebounds, and 6.7 assists in 25.0 minutes per game.

On August 17, 2006, Barea signed a multi-year deal with the Dallas Mavericks. On November 4, 2006, he made his regular season debut for the franchise, recording two points in two and a half minutes of action during a 76–107 loss to the Houston Rockets.

On January 17, 2007, Barea was assigned to the Fort Worth Flyers of the NBA Development League. On January 29, he was named the D-League Performer of the Week after he topped 40 points in two different games while leading the Flyers to a 3–1 record. On February 1, 2007, he was recalled by the Mavericks after he averaged 27.3 points, 5.0 rebounds, 7.8 assists, and 1.3 steals in eight D-League games.

On April 13, 2007, Barea recorded a season-high 16 points in an 89–104 loss to the Utah Jazz. Four days later, he started his first career game for the Mavericks in which he contributed 13 points, 10 rebounds, and 3 assists during an 82–111 loss to the Golden State Warriors. Barea finished his rookie season with averages of 2.4 points, 0.5 rebounds, 0.8 assists, and 0.7 steals in 33 regular season games. He also played two playoff games for the Mavericks, scoring 0 points in three and a half total minutes.

In July 2007, Barea re-joined the Dallas Mavericks for the 2007 Las Vegas Summer League, where in five games, he averaged 16.0 points, 2.5 rebounds, and 7.0 assists in 27.6 minutes per game.

On November 3, 2007, he recorded a then career-high 25 points in a 123–102 victory over the Sacramento Kings. He went on to appear in 44 regular season games (with 9 starts) for the Mavericks in 2007–08 while averaging 4.3 points, 1.1 rebounds, and 1.3 assists in 10.5 minutes per game. He also managed one playoff game where he contributed eight points against the New Orleans Hornets.

On July 9, 2008, Barea re-signed with the Dallas Mavericks to a three-year deal. In 2008–09, Barea's role on the team increased dramatically. Injuries to Jerry Stackhouse, Josh Howard, and Jason Terry saw Barea's minutes per game double as coach Rick Carlisle began regularly using a three-guard lineup which included Jason Kidd, Jason Terry, and Barea to spark an offensive streak in games. On February 20, 2009, Barea scored a then career high 26 points during an 86–93 loss to the Houston Rockets.

In the 2009 playoffs, Barea became a starter during the first round, replacing Antoine Wright in an effort to contain Tony Parker of the San Antonio Spurs. He put up 13 points and added 7 assists in his first playoff start.

==== 2009–11: first championship ====
In the 2009–10 season, Barea again played an important role off the bench for the Mavericks. Over 78 games (with 18 starts), he averaged 7.6 points, 1.9 rebounds, and 3.3 assists in 19.8 minutes per game. He scored a season-high 23 points twice during the season and played in all six of the Mavericks' playoff games, where they once again fell to the San Antonio Spurs in the first round.

In June 2010, the Mavericks exercised their $1.8 million 2010–11 team option on Barea's contract.

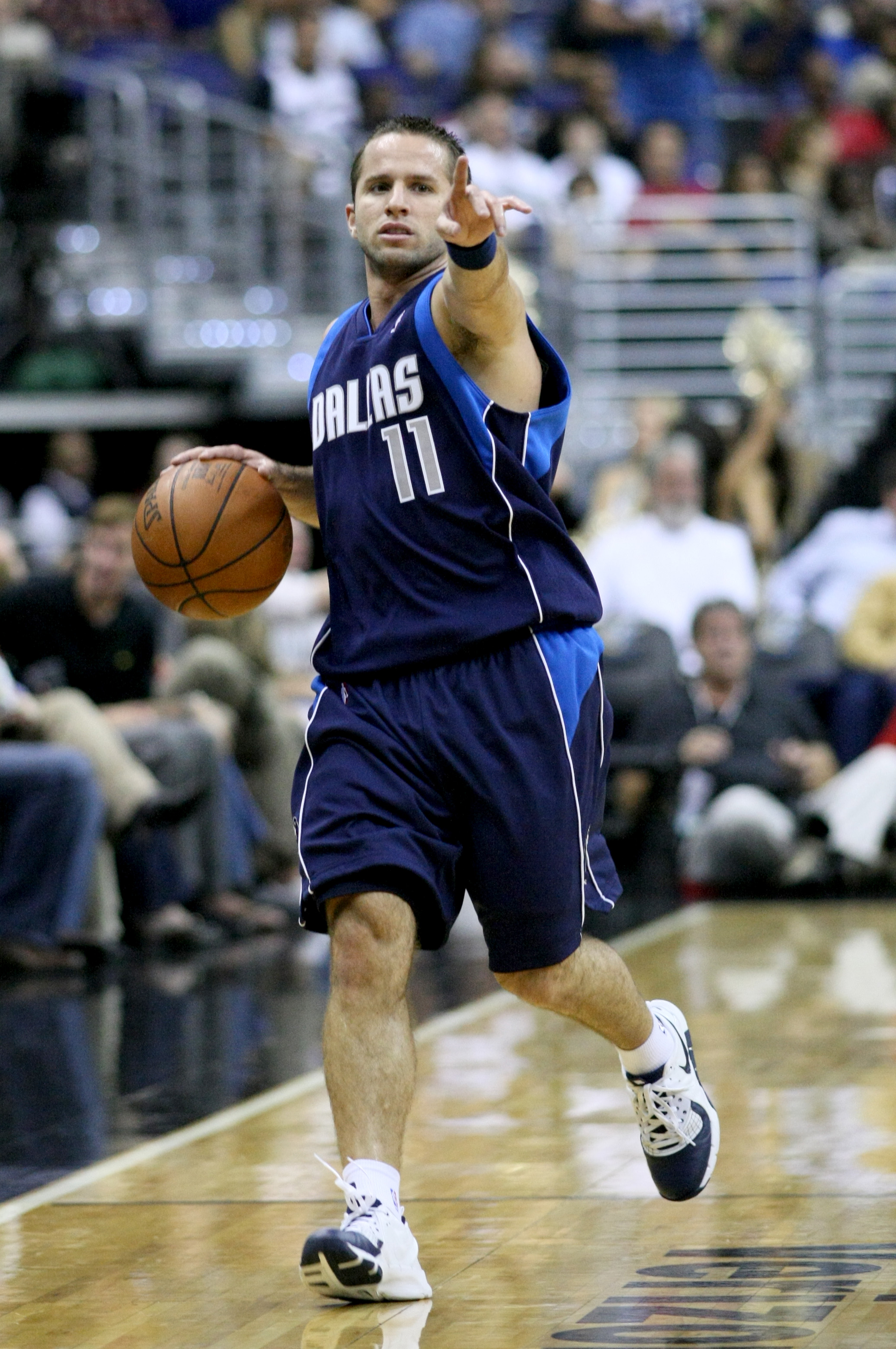
Barea playing for Dallas

In 2010–11, Barea played a career-high 81 regular season games, averaging 9.5 points, 2.0 rebounds, and 3.9 assists in 20.6 minutes per contest. On January 1, 2011, he scored a then career-high 29 points in an 87–99 loss to the Milwaukee Bucks.

In the second round of the 2011 playoffs, the Mavericks faced off against the defending champions, the Los Angeles Lakers. During the second game of the series, Barea converted 12 points coming off the bench to lead a fourth-quarter rally that secured the 93–81 win for Dallas. With the game already decided and 24 seconds remaining, Barea was clotheslined by Lakers' Center Andrew Bynum for which Bynum was subsequently suspended. After the game, the Lakers praised Barea's performance with Phil Jackson even comparing him to star point guard Chris Paul, while Kobe Bryant went on record saying that "Barea kicked our asses".

The Mavericks won the final game of the series to advance past the Lakers. Barea was the second-leading scorer for his team, putting up 22 points to go along with 8 assists. At one point in the fourth quarter, Barea had darted down the lane and was in midair about to finish a layup when Lakers' center Andrew Bynum threw him an elbow; the flagrant foul caused Barea to fall down hard and Bynum to be immediately ejected. Barea recovered, however, and played the rest of the game. He called the foul "dangerous". Initially Bynum was unapologetic about the incident, saying, "We were getting embarrassed. They were breaking us down. So I just fouled somebody." He later issued a formal apology to the league and to Barea. The NBA suspended Bynum for the first five games in the next season in consequence, but later shortened the suspension to four games due to the lockout-shortened season.

The Mavericks advanced to the NBA Finals where they faced the Miami Heat led by the trio of Dwyane Wade, Chris Bosh, and Lebron James. Coach Rick Carlisle decided to start Barea when they were down 1–2 in the series. Barea became a key player, being instrumental in changing the dynamic of the entire series and winning the next three games. The Mavericks defeated the Heat 4 games to 2 and so claimed their first NBA championship in franchise history. Barea became the second Puerto Rican player to ever win an NBA championship, following Butch Lee in 1980. Barea started in three of 21 playoff games that he played for the Mavericks, while averaging 8.9 points, 1.9 rebounds, and 3.4 assists in 18.6 minutes per game.

=== Minnesota Timberwolves (2011–2014) ===
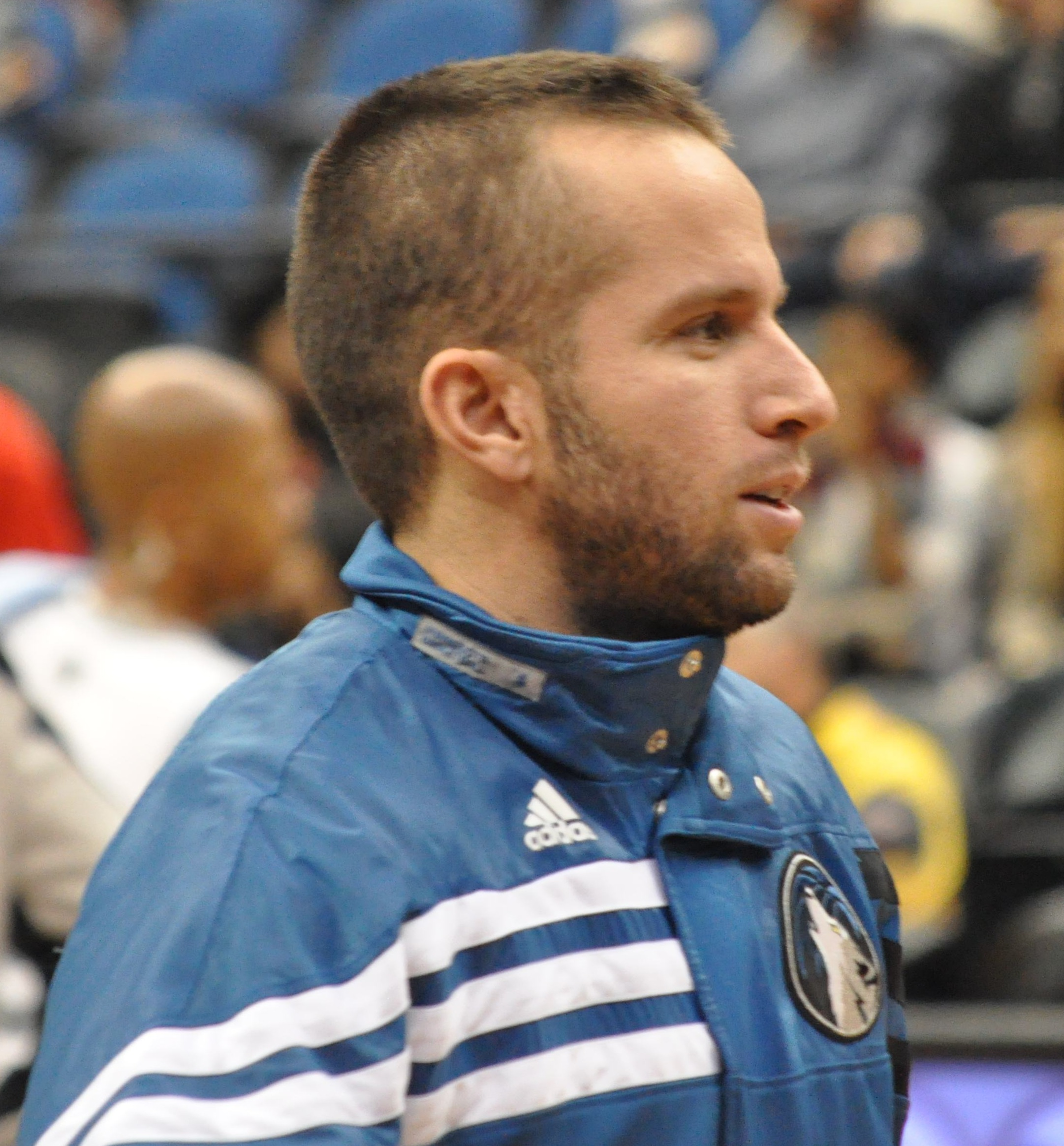
Barea before a game in 2012

After failed negotiations to re-sign with the Mavericks, Barea began looking elsewhere, but, because of the NBA lockout, he was unable to sign with another franchise. On December 14, 2011, following the conclusion of the lockout, Barea signed a four-year, $19 million contract with the Minnesota Timberwolves.

On December 26, 2011, Barea made his debut for the Timberwolves, recording 14 points, 2 assists, and 2 rebounds in a 100–104 loss to the Oklahoma City Thunder. However, Barea's season was hampered with ankle and thigh injuries as he managed only 41 of 66 games for the Timberwolves in 2011–12. Despite this, on March 23, 2012, Barea recorded his first career triple-double, putting up 25 points along with 10 rebounds and 14 assists in a 149–140 loss to the Oklahoma City Thunder. During the last weeks of the season, and with injuries to starters Ricky Rubio, Kevin Love, and Luke Ridnour, Barea became the starting point guard, averaging 15.8 points and 9.4 assists during the last 9 games. During that period, Barea tallied a season-high 28 points and a career-high 15 assists.

Barea began the season with 21 points and 5 assists against the Sacramento Kings on November 2, 2012. However, in his fourth game, he sprained his left foot, which caused him to miss the next five contests. In December, Barea averaged more than 25 minutes and 12.7 points per game coming off the bench. He had his best game of the season on April 12, when he scored 23 points against the Utah Jazz. He finished that season with averages of 11.3 points, 4.0 assists, and 2.8 rebounds in 23.1 minutes per game.

In 2013–14, Barea served as the Timberwolves back-up point guard behind Ricky Rubio. He had his best offensive game on November 15, against the Denver Nuggets, scoring 21 points to go with 4 assists. In January, Timberwolves star Kevin Love indirectly criticized teammates Barea and Dante Cunningham for their behavior during game timeouts. Barea finished the season averaging 8.4 points and 3.8 assists per game.

On October 27, 2014, Barea was waived by the Timberwolves in the hope of returning to the Dallas Mavericks.

=== Return to Dallas (2014–2020) ===
On October 29, 2014, Barea signed a contract with the Dallas Mavericks, returning to the franchise for a second stint. In his first game back for Dallas the following day, Barea received a standing ovation from the American Airlines Center crowd as he entered the game off the bench during the first quarter. He went on to record 4 points, 4 rebounds, and 3 assists in the 120–102 victory over the Utah Jazz. On February 11, 2015, Barea scored a season-high 22 points on 8-of-15 shooting in an 87–82 win over the Jazz.

On July 16, 2015, Barea re-signed with the Mavericks to a four-year, $16 million contract. On December 23, 2015, Barea scored a career-high 32 points on 13-of-20 shooting during a 119–118 overtime win versus the Brooklyn Nets. Three days later, he made a career-high seven three-pointers and finished with 26 points in a 118–111 win over the Chicago Bulls. On March 30, 2016, he scored 26 points, including a go-ahead layup with 49.9 seconds left as the Mavericks rallied in the fourth quarter to beat the New York Knicks, 91–89. Following his performance against the Knicks and in three other Mavericks wins that week, Barea was named Western Conference Player of the Week on April 4. On April 6, he helped the Mavericks secure their fifth consecutive victory by recording game-highs of 27 points and 8 assists during an 88–86 win over the Houston Rockets. Having become the Mavericks' sparkplug late in the season with Deron Williams sidelined, Barea suffered his own injury on April 8, a right groin strain which forced him to leave the contest against the Memphis Grizzlies after only eight minutes. The groin injury continued to bother him for the rest of the regular season and into the Mavericks' first round playoff series with the Oklahoma City Thunder.

In the Mavericks' season-opener on October 26, 2016, Barea scored 22 points in a 130–121 overtime loss to the Indiana Pacers. On December 19, 2016, he returned to action after missing a month with a strained right calf. He finished with 11 points in 13 minutes against the Denver Nuggets. He went back on the injured list in January 2017; then after sitting out 20 games with a left calf strain, he returned to the hardwood in a 105–96 victory over the Brooklyn Nets on March 10, during which he added 9 points to 3 assists in 14 minutes of play.

On February 24, 2018, in a 97–90 loss to the Utah Jazz, Barea hit his 500th 3-point field goal as a Maverick, becoming only the eighth player in franchise history to reach 500 made 3-pointers. On March 22, 2018, he had a season-high 23 points during a 119–112 loss to the Jazz. The game marked his 567th for the Mavericks and broke a tie with Mark Aguirre for the eighth-most in team history.

On January 11, 2019, Barea suffered a torn right Achilles tendon in a game against the Minnesota Timberwolves. He underwent surgery three days later.

On August 19, 2019, Barea was re-signed by the Dallas Mavericks. He played in 29 games that season, averaging 15.5 minutes per game.

Barea re-signed for another year on December 1, 2020. Nine days later, he was waived.

=== Movistar Estudiantes (2021) ===
On January 23, 2021, Barea signed with Movistar Estudiantes of the LEB Oro, where he played 18 games and averaged 12.6 points, 4.7 assists and 2.3 turnovers in 22:45 minutes. In May 2021, he left Estudiantes.

=== Return to Cangrejeros de Santurce (2021–2022) ===
On May 17, 2021, Barea signed with the Cangrejeros de Santurce of the Baloncesto Superior Nacional. He averaged 12.4 points and 5 assists per game in 23 contests. On February 22, 2022, Barea re-signed with the team.

On July 20, 2022, Barea announced his retirement from professional basketball.

== National team career ==
Barea began his international career with Puerto Rico's Under-19 junior national team, participating in the 2003 FIBA Under-19 World Championship where he tied for third place in the tournament's Most Valuable Player poll. His next international performance occurred at Caguas, Puerto Rico, in the Under-21 Centrobasket tournament, in which Puerto Rico won the gold medal. Barea was awarded the Most Valuable Player award after leading the tournament in scoring, assists, and steals. His last participation at the Under-21 level was at the 2005 FIBA Under-21 World Championship, where he finished fourth in scoring with an average of 17.6 points per game and led the competition in assists with 7.3 per game, as Puerto Rico took seventh.

In July 2006, Barea made his debut for the senior national team in the 2006 Central American and Caribbean Games, where Puerto Rico captured the gold medal. In the championship game against Panama, Barea drilled the decisive three-point basket with fourteen seconds left to give Puerto Rico a final advantage. Puerto Rico finished the tournament undefeated after six straight victories. Barea was then named the tournament's Most Valuable Player. He was the primary point guard for the Puerto Rican team that won the silver medal in the 2007 Pan American Games. Later that year, he played limited minutes in the 2007 FIBA Americas Championship, where Puerto Rico won the bronze medal. In 2008, Barea partook in a series of preparatory tournaments before the 2008 FIBA World Olympic Qualifying Tournament. In these exhibition games, he played in the starting lineup. The Olympic Qualifying Tournament began on July 14, 2008, with Barea returning to the back-up point guard position behind Carlos Arroyo. Puerto Rico advanced to the finals, but did not qualify to the 2008 Summer Olympics. In this tournament, Barea had averages of 12.4 points, 2.2 assists, and 3.2 rebounds per game.

Barea continued playing backup point guard at the 2008 Centrobasket tournament and entered the final round leading the event in points, after scoring 31 and 30 against Panama and the Dominican Republic, respectively. In the last two games, Barea was promoted to the starting lineup. Puerto Rico went on to claim the gold medal of the tournament, by defeating the United States Virgin Islands, and Barea to receive its Most Valuable Player award. In 2009, the Mavericks declined to allow Barea to participate in the FIBA Americas Championship for fear that he might re-injure his left shoulder after having recently undergone post-season surgery to repair it. Barea returned to international play at the 2010 Centrobasket, serving as the national team's starting point guard, while Arroyo was moved to the regular shooting guard position. Puerto Rico ousted Panama in the semi-finals and the Dominican Republic in the finals to capture the gold medal. Barea averaged 13.8 points and led CentroBasket in assists per game, with 7; for his efforts, he clinched a spot on the All-Star Team for the tournament.

Barea helped Puerto Rico take home a silver medal at the 2013 FIBA Americas Championship, and he was named to the All-Tournament Team. He was also on the roster of the national team that played in the 2014 FIBA Basketball World Cup. Although Puerto Rico was eliminated in the second round, Barea finished as the World Cup Top Scorer during the First Round. He accumulated 110 points in 5 contests for an average of 22 points per game. Barea's scoring statistics proved above even such talents as Luis Scola, Andray Blatche, Pau Gasol, and Francisco García.

== Coaching career ==
On 30 May 2017, Barea was appointed the head coach of Indios de Mayagüez of the BSN for the rest of the 2017 season.

On 15 August 2021, Barea was hired by the Dallas Mavericks as a player development coach. He concluded his duties by the end of the year.

As of May 2023, Barea was the general manager of Grises de Humacao of the BSN.

In August 2023, Barea was appointed the head coach of Mets de Guaynabo for the 2024 BSN season. The team qualified for the postseason but were eliminated in the quarterfinals by Leones de Ponce. He was fired in May 2025, midway through the 2025 season, being replaced by Josh King. The team was sitting fifth in Conference A with an 8–10 record.

On July 1, 2025, CBS Sports reported that Barea had been hired as an Assistant Coach by the Denver Nuggets.

== Career statistics ==
Legend
GP	Games played	GS	Games started	MPG	Minutes per game
FG%	Field goal percentage	3P%	3-point field goal percentage	FT%	Free throw percentage
RPG	Rebounds per game	APG	Assists per game	SPG	Steals per game
BPG	Blocks per game	PPG	Points per game	**Bold**	Career high
†	Won an NBA championship

=== NBA ===
==== Regular season ====
Year	Team	GP	GS	MPG	FG%	3P%	FT%	RPG	APG	SPG	BPG	PPG
2006–07	Dallas	33	1	5.8	.359	.286	.667	.8	.7	.0	.0	2.4
2007–08	Dallas	44	9	10.5	.418	**.389**	.800	1.1	1.3	.3	.0	4.3
2008–09	Dallas	79	15	20.3	.442	.357	.753	2.2	3.4	.5	**.1**	7.8
2009–10	Dallas	78	**18**	19.8	.440	.357	.844	1.9	3.3	.4	**.1**	7.6
2010–11†	Dallas	**81**	2	20.6	.439	.349	.847	2.0	3.9	.4	.0	9.5
2011–12	Minnesota	41	11	**25.2**	.400	.371	.776	2.8	5.7	.5	.0	11.3
2012–13	Minnesota	74	2	23.1	.417	.346	.784	2.8	4.0	.4	.0	11.3
2013–14	Minnesota	79	1	18.6	.387	.347	.790	1.9	3.8	.3	.0	8.4
2014–15	Dallas	77	10	17.7	.420	.323	.809	1.7	3.4	.4	.0	7.5
2015–16	Dallas	74	16	22.5	**.446**	.385	.771	2.1	4.1	.4	.0	10.9
2016–17	Dallas	35	6	22.0	.414	.358	.863	2.4	5.5	.4	.0	10.9
2017–18	Dallas	69	10	23.2	.439	.367	.784	**2.9**	**6.3**	.5	.0	**11.6**
2018–19	Dallas	38	0	19.8	.418	.297	.705	2.5	5.6	**.6**	.0	10.9
2019–20	Dallas	29	6	15.5	.411	.376	**.909**	1.8	3.9	.2	**.1**	7.7
Career		831	107	19.6	.424	.352	.794	2.1	3.9	.4	.0	8.9

==== Playoffs ====
Year	Team	GP	GS	MPG	FG%	3P%	FT%	RPG	APG	SPG	BPG	PPG
2007	Dallas	2	0	2.0	.000	.000	.000	.0	.0	.0	.0	.0
2008	Dallas	1	0	5.0	**.750**	**1.000**	.000	.0	1.0	.0	.0	8.0
2009	Dallas	10	**4**	22.1	.437	.313	.692	2.0	3.4	.3	.0	7.6
2010	Dallas	6	0	17.5	.405	.400	.333	2.0	2.5	.3	**.2**	5.8
2011†	Dallas	**21**	3	18.6	.419	.320	.794	1.9	3.4	.3	.0	8.9
2015	Dallas	5	2	**30.8**	.439	.250	.833	**4.8**	**7.4**	**.8**	.0	**11.8**
2016	Dallas	4	2	25.0	.324	.125	**1.000**	1.5	5.0	.0	.0	6.3
2020	Dallas	1	0	5.0	.000	.000	**1.000**	.0	.0	.0	.0	3.0
Career		50	11	19.7	.418	.314	.746	2.0	3.6	.3	.0	7.9

=== International tournaments ===
Tournament	Year	GP	MPG	2P%	3P%	FT%	RPG	APG	PPG
2015 FIBA Americas Championship	2015	6	27.5	.520	.474	.846	4.3	7.8	21.3
2015 Marchand Continental Championship Cup	2015	1	32	.500	.250	.750	9.0	8.0	17.0
2015 Pan American Games	2015	4	20.0	.406	.200	1.00	1.5	2.8	11.5

=== College ===
Year	Team	GP	GS	MPG	FG%	3P%	FT%	RPG	APG	SPG	BPG	PPG
2002–03	Northeastern	28	28	32.2	.407	.316	**.785**	3.0	3.9	1.6	.0	17.0
2003–04	Northeastern	26	25	**34.2**	.385	**.358**	.719	3.6	5.8	1.7	.0	20.7
2004–05	Northeastern	**30**	**29**	33.2	**.419**	.321	.784	4.3	7.3	**1.8**	.0	**22.2**
2005–06	Northeastern	29	21	33.6	.400	.291	.764	**4.4**	**8.4**	1.3	.0	21.0
Career		113	103	33.3	.404	.321	.764	3.9	6.4	1.6	.0	20.3

== Personal life ==
While listed as 6 ft 0 in (1.83 m) by the NBA, Barea's mother believes his actual height is around 5 ft 10 in (1.78 m). In a 2016 Wall Street Journal story, Barea said that when announced as being 6 feet in pregame player introductions, he sometimes had to stop himself from giggling "because me and about 20,000 other people in the arena knew that was a lie." In September 2019, Barea was officially measured by the Mavericks organization and was found to stand 5 ft 10 in (1.78 m) barefoot.

In March 2011, Barea confirmed he was in a relationship with Miss Universe 2006 Zuleyka Rivera. In July 2011, they confirmed that they were expecting their first child. Rivera gave birth to their son Sebastián José Barea Rivera on February 17, 2012. Barea was present during the birth. The couple later split in April 2013.

In the summer of 2013, Barea started dating actress and Miss Universe Puerto Rico 2011 Viviana Ortiz. In February 2016, they confirmed that they were expecting their first child. Their daughter Paulina Barea Ortiz was born on March 31, 2016. Barea and Ortiz got married on August 20, 2016, in a lavish ceremony at the church of the Universidad del Sagrado Corazón in San Juan, Puerto Rico.

Five days after Hurricane Maria hit, Barea spoke to his parents on a family friend's phone to inform them that Mavs owner Mark Cuban lent him the team plane to fly down to Puerto Rico the next day with food, water, and supplies. The Mavs' team plane made the trip five times, delivering a total of more than 100,000 pounds of food, water, power generators, and other supplies. Barea made the trip once while his stay-at-home wife ran the other four trips and focused full-time on the relief efforts. Barea's efforts in helping Puerto Rico earned him the NBA's J. Walter Kennedy Citizenship Award and the Hall of Fame's Mannie Jackson Award recognizing human spirit.

Barea is 12 credits short of getting his college degree from Northeastern. His older brothers are Jaime, a doctor, and Jason, an engineer. Barea returns to his hometown Mayagüez only a few times a year, and usually stops first in Barrio Paris, a poorer part of town where his father used to drive daily to pick up his teammates. Before the hurricane, his foundation focused on refurbishing basketball courts in poor areas. He holds several basketball clinics each summer throughout the island and usually donates uniforms and equipment for the youth leagues run by Tommy Zapata, who coached Barea from when he was a 3-year-old who could dribble the ball ambidextrously.
