= Cangrejeros de Santurce (basketball) =

Puerto Rican professional basketball team

- Nickname: "Crabbers"
- Leagues: Baloncesto Superior Nacional; BCL Americas
- Arena: Roberto Clemente Coliseum
- Capacity: 12,500
- Location: Santurce, San Juan, Puerto Rico
- Team colors: Crab orange, blue, white
- Team manager: René Morales
- Ownership: Bad Bunny; Noah Assad; Jonathan Miranda
- Championships: 8 (1962, 1968, 1998, 1999, 2000, 2001, 2003, 2007)
- Retired numbers: 7 (4, 5, 7, 10, 12, 13, 33, 54)
- Website: Official website
Home	Away	Third

Cangrejeros de Santurce is the name of several franchises sanctioned by the professional basketball league Baloncesto Superior Nacional (BSN) of Puerto Rico. Named after Santurce, all versions have played out of San Juan. The first franchise was founded in 1918 and began active play in the BSN in 1956, winning titles in 1962 and 1968 before folding.

The second iteration of the Cangrejeros played their home games at the Roberto Clemente Coliseum under the ownership of music industry executive Angelo Medina, winning five championships in a six-year span (including four consecutive) and another in 2007. This version remained active for another decade after winning its last championship. In 2021, a new franchise was approved under the name of Cangrejeros under the ownership of artist Bad Bunny and urban music entrepreneurs Noah Assad and Jonathan García. Teams bearing the name of Cangrejeros have won 8 championships and appeared in 14 BSN finals.

== History ==
=== The first years (1918–1976) ===
Founded in 1918, the team has included name players such as Teófilo Cruz, and Rafael Valle. Cruz, #13, played for 25 seasons being MVP in 4 seasons and leading the BSN in points per game 2 times. He was the starting center of the PR national basketball team in the times when Puerto Rico and Brazil where the two most dominant teams in the Americas outside the USA. Valle, #5, arguably the best power forward in BSN history, played actively in 8 seasons finishing MVP and first in points per game in 1956. He was active in 2 Olympic games, where he led Puerto Rico in scoring both times. After 2 championships, and several finals, the Santurce Crabbers played their last season in 1976.

=== The return (1998–2016) ===
Logo during the Medina administration.

On 1998, Angelo Medina acquired the Tiburones de Aguadilla and the Capitalinos de San Juan, merged them and acquired other free agents (in a time when there was no Free Agency in the BSN) to revive the Cangrejeros, who started playing in the Roberto Clemente Coliseum. The team featured players like: Jose "Piculin" Ortiz, Carlos Arroyo, Orlando "Guayacan" Santiago and Jeffrey Aubry. Besides those players, Santurce featured as a coach Julio Toro, who was the coach of the national team and had previously won a championship in the league. The team went on to defeat the Leones de Ponce in the final.

Rolando Hourruitiner would join the Cangrejeros in 1999. Santurce won the BSN championship in 1999, 2000, 2001 (completing a rare, back-to-back-to-back-to-back four titles in a row run) and 2003. In all those championships the team was led by Ortiz, Arroyo and Horrutinier, the 3 then members of the national team. In 2007, the Cangrejeros won their eighth league championship.

=== Move from the Roberto Clemente Coliseum ===
In 2005, the mayor of San Juan, Jorge Santini, decided that the Cangrejeros could no longer play in the Roberto Clemente Coliseum because the assistance was low and it was not worth playing there and offered them the Pedrín Zorrilla Coliseum, which is used for volleyball. The mayor of Guaynabo, Héctor O'Neill, offered Medina use of the Mario Morales Coliseum, located in Guaynabo, and Medina decided to split home games between there and the recently opened Puerto Rico Coliseum. The games at the Puerto Rico Coliseum averaged an attendance of 10,000. Santini and the municipality of San Juan insisted that the Pedrín Zorrilla Coliseum should be used, and even had a giant billboard in front of the coliseum that read “We want this (the Pedrín Zorrilla) to be the new home of the Cangrejeros”. The use of the "Quijote" Morales Coliseum contributed to the return of the Conquistadores de Guaynabo.

In 2007, the Cangrejeros advanced to the league's round robin, following a 73–70 victory over Fajardo. In this game Robert Traylor scored the first triple-double in the season with 17 points, 15 rebounds and ten blocks. This total established a new record in blocks for a single game, breaking the previous record of nine. With less than a minute remaining Orlando Santiago scored a free throw and subsequently stole a ball to secure a win. The Cangrejeros would reach the finals and face the Capitanes de Arecibo, defeating them in the series to win the league's championship.

During this time frame, the team remains played its home games in Guaynabo and the Puerto Rico Coliseum. The José Miguel Agrelot Coliseum was used in playoffs and regular season games against teams that attract a large crowd such as the Capitanes, Leones de Ponce and Vaqueros de Bayamón.

In 2008, the Cangrejeros advanced to the league's "Super 6" semifinals. They began a series against the Capitanes on June 5, 2008. Santurce won the first game, but lost the second. This was followed by a series against the Gigantes de Carolina, winning the first game.

In 2015, former Cangrejeros player and former NBA player Carlos Arroyo returned to the team after ending his music career, an endeavor in which he had briefly engaged.

=== Inactivity (2016–2020) ===
In 2017, the team recessed.

In 2018, the Cangrejeros were acquired by businessmen Ricardo García and Camilo Domínguez. Ricardo Garcia who is the owner of Havoc Media Group and Camilo Domiguez owner of Reydom Sports and entertainment group both entrepreneurs of Orlando Florida.

After some controversy and some allegedly fraud in the part of Ariel Rodriguez who was the owner previous to Ricardo Garcia and Camilo Dominguez both are no longer owners of the team. During the exchange Rodriguez failed to provided accurate information of the debts owned to vendors, team staff, third parties, agents, coaches and players. After the team was taken over by Mr. Garcia and Mr. Camilo Dominguez many issues came to light. In one of the issues there was some controversy of misuse of money needed to pay debts passed on by Angelo Medina. Now the team has been recessed once again and Ariel Rodriguez continues to be the team owner and liable for over 400k + in debt.

=== Expansion franchise (2021–present) ===
In April 2021, the league approved the return of the Cangrejeros under the ownership of Noah Assad and Jonathan Miranda, who were joined by urban artist Bad Bunny the following month. Veteran point guard José Juan Barea served as the cornerstone of a roster that had begun construction with the purchase of shooting guard Isaac Sosa's contract from the Atléticos. The staff was composed by Néstor García, with former players Elías Ayuso and Carla Cortijo as assistants and Daniel Seoane as scout. More roster acquisitions, including import players Dante Cunningham and Thomas Robinson, as well as a return to the José Miguel Agrelot Coliseum were announced during the off-season.

Throughout the 2021 season the veteran roster of the Cangrejeros faced several difficulties, including recurrent injuries on Barea. While still in contention García was released from his contract, becoming the new head coach of the Argentina national baseball team. Assistant Larry Ayuso took over the staff and lead it in a second half that saw the team fell to the fourth place of the B Division to close the regular season. Before the postseason began, the administration left José Miguel Agrelot Coliseum and moved to Roberto Clemente Coliseum. Cangrejeros faced Capitanes de Arecibo in their first round matchup, being eliminated in the series 2-4.

During the off-season, Cangrejeros acquired guard Gian Clavell in a trade, signed imports Skal Labissière and Tyler Hansbrough and free agents forwards Ramón Clemente, Gilberto Clavell and Ángel Matías. The team also brought Iván Ríos as an assistant coach, ultimately taking over the full role when Ayuso left to join the Piratas in March 2022, with Luis Armando Cancel and Cortijo completing the staff.

== International performance ==
=== FIBA Americas League ===
As champions of the 2007 BSN season the Cangrejeros were one of two teams selected to represent Puerto Rico in the first edition of the FIBA Americas League, the other team representing the island in this event were the league's runner-up the Capitanes de Arecibo. The Cangrejeros qualified to the tournament's second round, finishing the first with a record of 2-1. Santurce lost a one-point game to Soles de Mexicali (74:75) and defeated the PBL All-Stars (97:73) and Metros de Santiago (91:62) as part of the Group A games hosted at the Mario Morales Coliseum. After advancing they were matched against the Miami Tropics in three game hosted by them at Florida International University's basketball court. Santurce won the first game of this round with a score of 102:94. However, they lost the remaining games to the home team with scores of 64:91 and 83:91 and were eliminated in the quarterfinals.

=== FIBA Basketball Champions League Americas ===
In September 2021, Cangrejeros became the first BSN team to participate in the Basketball Champions League Americas (which replaced the Americas League in 2019) by joining the participating clubs for the 2021-22 tournament. In the first window that took place at Nicaragua, Santurce defeated the Edmonton Stingers 89:68 and Real Estelí Baloncesto 91:88. The Cangrejeros were selected to host the second stage of its group, with the Roberto Clemente Coliseum serving as their home court. However, local venue capacity restrictions introduced to curve the proliferation of the SARS-CoV-2 Omicron variant led to the postponement and relocation, with Managua hosting again. In the second window, Cangrejeros lost to Real Estelí (78:82) and defeated Stingers (93:55). Santurce dropped both of the games in the third window played at Calgary, first to Stingers (93:87) and to Estelí (96:83) in the closer.

By finishing first, the Cangrejeros were matched against Quimsa in the quarterfinals.

== Other media ==
The Cangrejeros are featured in Season 5 of NBA 2K24’s MyTEAM and MyCareer game modes, in which the team's court, uniform and owner Benito Martínez are included as part of the Bad Bunny Spotlight challenge. In February 2024, the team announced a collaboration with Santurce Brewery to market a limited edition beer, the Cangrejeros Blonde Ale. The product was unaffiliated with the BSN and not made available in Roberto Clemente Coliseum during seasonal games, instead being offered as a promotional item in certain San Juan establishments.

== Players ==
=== Current roster ===
Note: Flags indicate national team eligibility at FIBA-sanctioned events. Players may hold other non-FIBA nationalities not displayed.

Cangrejeros de Santurce roster
Players
Coaches

Pos.	No.	Nat.	Name	Ht.	Wt.	Age
F	0	(Puerto Rico)	Piñeiro, Isaiah	6 ft 7 in (2.01 m)	221 lb (100 kg)	31 – February 2, 1995
PG	1	(Puerto Rico) (United States)	Howard, Jordan	5 ft 11 in (1.80 m)	180 lb (82 kg)	30 – January 6, 1996
G	10	(Puerto Rico)	Maldonado, Emmanuel	6 ft 5 in (1.96 m)	190 lb (86 kg)	24 – July 18, 2002
PG	24	(Puerto Rico)	Rodríguez, Ángel	6 ft 0 in (1.83 m)	180 lb (82 kg)	33 – December 5, 1992
PF	44	(Puerto Rico)	Collier, Devon	6 ft 8 in (2.03 m)	215 lb (98 kg)	35 – January 20, 1991
F		(United States) (Puerto Rico)	Bruesewitz, Mike	6 ft 7 in (2.01 m)		36 – 9 August 1990
F		(United States) (Puerto Rico)	Ford, Aleem (DC)	6 ft 8 in (2.03 m)	220 lb (100 kg)	28 – December 22, 1997
SG		(Cuba) (Puerto Rico)	Piñeiro, Juan Pablo (DC)	6 ft 4 in (1.93 m)	200 lb (91 kg)	36 – 15 April 1990
G		(Puerto Rico)	Santiago, Giovanni	6 ft 1 in (1.85 m)		26 – 4 January 2000

Head coach

- (Puerto Rico) Carlos Gonzales

Assistant coach(es)

- (Puerto Rico) Luis Camacho?
- (Puerto Rico) Alex Falcon?

Legend

- (C) Team captain
- (DC) Dual citizenship
- (I) Import player
- Injured

- Roster
Updated: 7 November 2026

=== Depth chart ===
Pos.	Starting 5	Bench 1	Bench 2
C			Devon Collier
PF
SF		Isaiah Piñeiro
SG	Ángel Rodríguez	Emmanuel Maldonado
PG		Jordan Howard

=== Retired numbers ===
Cangrejeros de Santurce retired numbers
No	Nat.	Player	Position	Tenure
4	(Puerto Rico)	José Ortiz	C	1998–2005
7	(Puerto Rico)	Carlos Arroyo	PG	1998–2003; 2015
10	(Puerto Rico)	René "Chiqui" Dávila	PG	1957–1959
13	(Puerto Rico)	Teófilo Cruz	C	1957–1976
33	(Puerto Rico)	Alex Falcón	PF	2001-2009, 2013
54	(United States)	Robert Traylor	PF / C	2007–2008

== Honours ==
=== Domestic competitions ===
==== League ====
- BSN Championship (8):

1962, 1968, 1998, 1999, 2000, 2001, 2003, 2007

== Head coaches ==
- (Puerto Rico) Fufi Santori
- (United States) Lou Rossini
- (United States) Skip Wilson
- (Puerto Rico) Julio Toro
- (Puerto Rico) Tony Ruiz
- (Spain) Paco Olmos (2013–2015)
- (Puerto Rico) Eddie Casiano (2016)
- (Argentina) Nestor García (2021)
- (Puerto Rico) Larry Ayuso (2021-2022)
- (Puerto Rico) Iván Ríos (2022-2023)
- (United States) Brad Greenberg (2024)
- (Puerto Rico) Nelson Colon (2025-2026)
- (Puerto Rico) David Rosario (2026-present)

== Notable players ==
Note: Flags indicate national team eligibility at FIBA-sanctioned events. Players may hold other non-FIBA nationalities not displayed.

Criteria

To appear in this section a player must have either:

- Set a club record or won an individual award while at the club
- Played at least one official international match for their national team at any time
- Played at least one official NBA match at any time.

- (Puerto Rico) Teófilo Cruz
- (Puerto Rico) Rafael Valle
- (Puerto Rico) Cachorro Santiago
- (Puerto Rico) Quijote Morales
- (Puerto Rico) José Ortiz
- (Puerto Rico) Rolando Hourruitiner
- (Puerto Rico) Carlos Arroyo
- (Puerto Rico) J. J. Barea
- (Puerto Rico) Danny Santiago
- (Puerto Rico) Larry Ayuso
- (Puerto Rico) - (United States Virgin Islands) Walter Hodge
- (Australia) Chris Goulding
- (Dominican Republic) Édgar Sosa
- (France) Johan Petro
- (Nigeria) Olumide Oyedeji
- (United States) - (Belize) Leon Williams
- (United States) Michael Foster Jr.
- (United States) Damion James
- (United States) Emmanuel Mudiay
- (United States) James Nunnally
- (United States) Thomas Robinson
- (United States) Jared Sullinger
- (United States) Michael Sweetney
- (United States) Robert Traylor
- (United States) Michael Beasley
- (United States) Kenneth Faried
- (United States) Will Barton
- (United States) Ian Clark
- (United States) Malik Beasley
- (United States) Hassan Whiteside
- (United States) / (North Macedonia) Jacob Wiley
- (United States) D.J. Wilson
