= Raúl Feliciano =

Puerto Rican basketball player

Personal information
- Born: July 31, 1930 Ciales, Puerto Rico
- Died: July 17, 2016 (aged 85) Río Piedras, Puerto Rico
- Listed height: 6 ft 0 in (1.83 m)
- Listed weight: 170 lb (77 kg)

Career information
- High school: Río Piedras (Río Piedras, Puerto Rico)
- College: University of Puerto Rico at Río Piedras (1945–1949)
- Playing career: 1947–1967
- Position: Center

Career history
- 1947–1951: Gallitos de la UPR
- 1952–1953: Santos de San Juan
- 1954–1956: Cardenales de Río Piedras
- 1961, 1963, 1967: Santos de San Juan

Career highlights
- 3× BSN champion (1951, 1955–1956); 2× BSN Most Valuable Player (1951, 1955); 6× BSN scoring champion (1948–1952, 1955); First Player in BSN to score 40pts in a game (1949)
Medals
Men's basketball
Representing Puerto Rico
Central American and Caribbean Games
Bronze medal – third place	1954 México City	Team competition

Raúl "Tinajón" Feliciano Rodríguez (July 31, 1930 – July 17, 2016) was a Puerto Rican professional basketball player and lawyer. He played basketball professionally in Puerto Rico in the Baloncesto Superior Nacional (BSN).

== Basketball career ==
Feliciano made his debut in the Baloncesto Superior Nacional (BSN) league in 1947 with the UPR of Río Piedras, averaging 7.78 points in 14 games. He was the BSN Scoring Champion from 1948 to 1952 before Fufi Santori became the scoring champion in 1953. His scoring ability began a media coverage not seen before in the Baloncesto Superior Nacional (BSN) and prompted a new record assistance of 114,468 paying fans for the BSN league. He finished his career with 4,719 points in the Baloncesto Superior Nacional. In the process he became the first player in the BSN to score 40 or more points in a basketball game, a feat he achieved with the Gallitos de la UPR on September 5, 1949, scoring 46 points in the triumph, 83–66, against the Cardenales de Río Piedras. Similarly, he was the first to average over 20 points per game in a season in the BSN league.

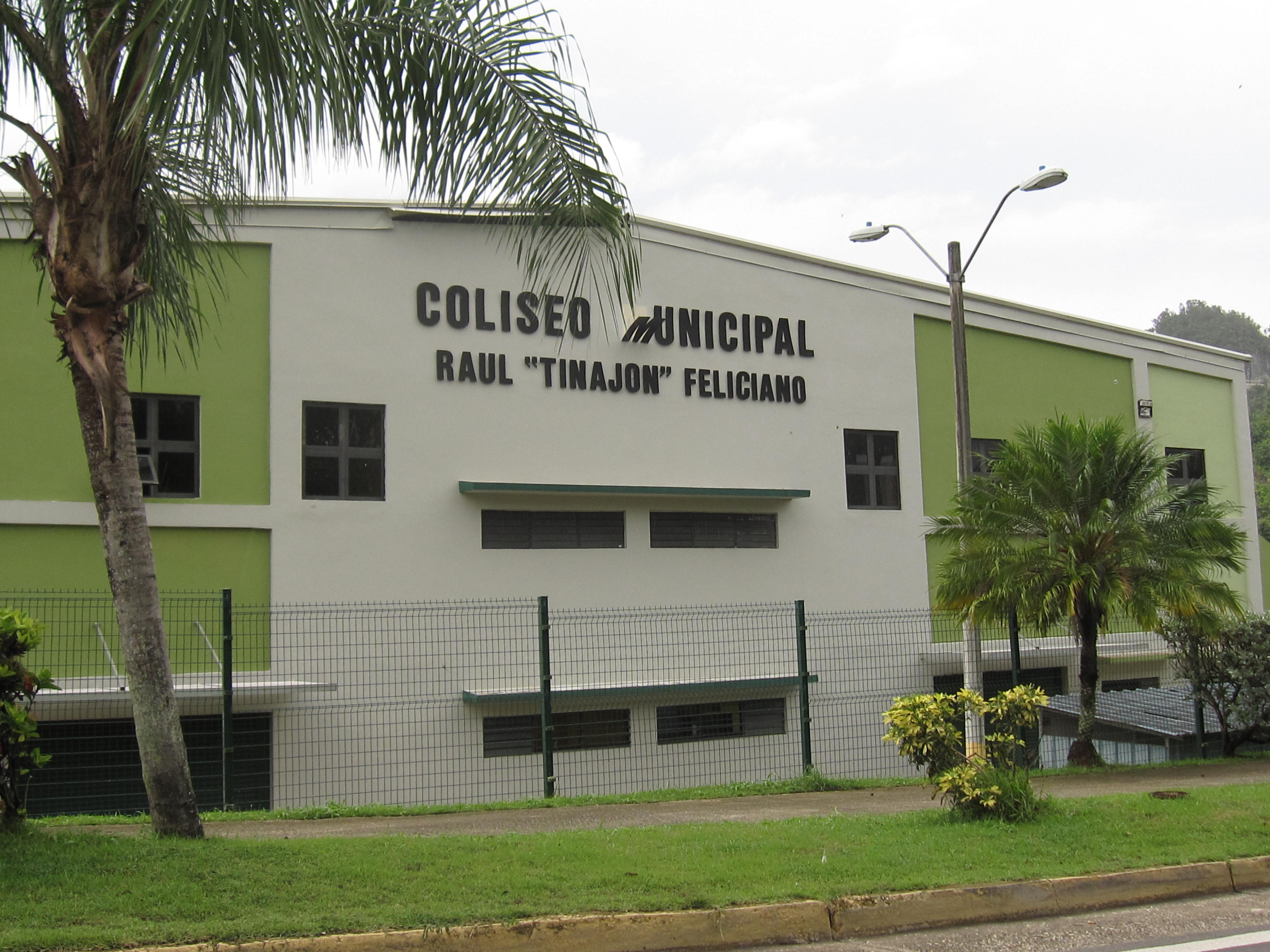
The Coliseo Municipal Raúl "Tinajón" Feliciano is in Ciales.

Feliciano became the first Puerto Rican basketball player to receive offers from National Basketball Association teams such as the Baltimore Bullets and the New York Knicks. His offensive profile included two main shots: a right hook shot and the jumpshot.

== Personal life ==
Feliciano was born in Ciales, Puerto Rico, on July 31, 1930. At an early age, he became interested in basketball and played at the Escuela Superior de Río Piedras. In 1945 Feliciano began his studies at the University of Puerto Rico, Río Piedras Campus. At age 18, he graduated in Business Administration from the University of Puerto Rico and two years later as a lawyer from the University of Puerto Rico School of Law. Feliciano died on July 17, 2016, at his home in Río Piedras, Puerto Rico do to a Kidney failure.
