= Bill McCadney =

Puerto Rican basketball player

William McCadney (5 February 1935 in Brooklyn, New York – 2 April 2009 in Arecibo, Puerto Rico) was a Puerto Rican basketball player who competed in the 1964 Summer Olympics and in the 1968 Summer Olympics. He was born in Brooklyn, New York and played college basketball at Fordham.
