= Juan "Pachín" Vicéns =

Puerto Rican basketball player

Juan Vicéns
Personal information
- Born: September 7, 1934 Ciales, Puerto Rico
- Died: February 18, 2007 (aged 72) Ponce, Puerto Rico
- Listed height: 5 ft 9 in (1.75 m)
- Listed weight: 170 lb (77 kg)

Career information
- College: Kansas State (1954–1956)
- Playing career: 1950–1966
- Position: Point guard
- Number: 8

Career history
- 1950–1966: Leones de Ponce

Career highlights
- 4× BSN MVP (1952, 1954, 1958, 1960)

Juan "Pachín" Vicéns Sastre (September 7, 1934 – February 18, 2007) was a Puerto Rican basketball player. Vicéns was famous for his performance with the Leones de Ponce and with the Puerto Rican national basketball team. During the 1959 FIBA World Championship in Chile, Vicéns was declared to be the Best Player in the World.

== Basketball career ==
Juan Vicéns Sastre was born in Ciales, Puerto Rico. He was the sixth child of José 'Pepito' Vicéns Batalla and Antonia 'doña Lila' Sastre. In 1949, he moved to Ponce to study in the Colegio Ponceño encouraged by his brother Enrique "Coco" Vicéns, who was already playing with the Lions.

After moving, he started visiting the practices and filling in for the team when a player was needed. In 1950, he finally debuted in the National Superior Basketball (BSN) league with the Ponce Lions. In 1952, he led the Lions to their first championship, and was declared the Most Valuable Player of the series. In 1954, he repeated the feat with another championship and his second MVP award.

Also, from 1954 to 1956, Vicéns played point guard at Kansas State University, under the tutelage of Tex Winter (Winter was a mentor of future Chicago Bulls/L.A. Lakers coach, Phil Jackson). In 1956, he led Kansas State to the NCAA Sweet Sixteen.

During his sixteen years with the Ponce Lions, he led them to ten finals, and seven championship titles. In 1958, he was the scoring leader of the league, and was selected the league's Most Valuable Player two more times (1958 and 1960). He was also the first player to score 5,000 points in the league, retiring with a total of 5,102. At the end of the 1950s, he received an invitation to play for the New York Knicks, but he declined, so he could continue playing with Ponce and with the Puerto Rican team.

Vicéns was a member of the Puerto Rican National Basketball Team and represented the island in four Central American and Caribbean Games, two World Championships and two Olympic Games. It was at the 1959 FIBA World Championship, held in Antofagasta, Chile that Vicéns was elected as the World's Best Basketball Player, while also being named among the five best players of the tournament.

In 1966, Vicéns—along with Juan "Johnny" Báez and Teo Cruz—led the National team to a gold medal at the Caribbean and Central American Games held in San Juan.

== Post-career ==
After retiring as an active basketball player in 1966, he kept involved in sports as a radio commentator.

== Later years ==
He was the final torchbearer and lighted the cauldron at the 1993 Central American and Caribbean Games held in Ponce.

During the second half of 2006, Vicéns' health started to deteriorate to the point that he had to have his legs amputated. Due to his illness he had to be hospitalized several times, and finally died on February 18, 2007, at his home in Ponce at the age of 72.

== Legacy ==
In 1972, the Ponce Lions gave their new venue the name of Juan Pachín Vicéns Coliseum. The venue is still decorated with Vicéns memorabilia like pictures, shirts, and a sculpture.

On May 25, 2007, Vicéns was officially named as a FIBA Hall of Fame candidate. The list of candidates includes a total of 34 world-renowned basketball figures.

In 1992, the city of Ponce once more recognized his achievements with a plaque at the Park for the Illustrious Ponce Citizens.

== See also ==
- List of Puerto Ricans
- National Superior Basketball
- Basketball at the 1960 Summer Olympics
