= Julio Toro =

Puerto Rican basketball player

Personal information
- Born: November 5, 1943 (age 83) Santurce, San Juan, Puerto Rico

Career information
- Playing career: 1961–1974
- Coaching career: 1977–present

Career highlights
- As a player: 3× BSN champion (1967, 1969, 1972); BSN Rookie of the Year (1961); As a coach: 12× BSN champion (1980, 1982, 1984, 1989, 1992, 1993, 1998–2001, 2003, 2009); BSN Coach of the Year (1979)

Julio Toro (born November 5, 1943) is a Puerto Rican basketball coach.

Toro is known for emphasizing the mental aspects of the game and making widespread use of philosophical principles, as well as other unorthodox techniques that include the incorporation of visual aids and poetry, which has earned him the nicknames "Jedi Master" and "sensei".

== International coaching career ==
=== Puerto Rico national team ===
At the 2004 Olympic Games in Athens, Greece, he made history by becoming the first non-Soviet coach to defeat the United States during Olympic competition, and the first coach to defeat an American team composed of NBA players at an Olympics match.

=== Venezuela national team ===
In 1991, after players Carl Herrera, Gabriel Estaba and Yván Olivares expressed dissatisfaction with then-coach of the Venezuela national basketball team Jesús Córdobés, Francisco Diez (then president of the Instituto Nacional del Deporte) travelled to Puerto Rico with the intention of recruiting Flor Meléndez. However, after negotiations were hindered due to his BSN contract, the coach recommended Toro for the role. Following a successful reunion, he took over the team. In his first competition, Toro led Venezuela to the first place of the South American Tournament, for which received a bonus of only $1,500. Toro returned the following year, when he coached the team to the final of the 1992 FIBA Americas Tournament, losing to the "Dream Team". He coached until the following year, returning for a final stint in 1997.

== Personal life ==
Toro's wife, Sibelys Prato, is a native of Venezuela. His eponymous younger son, Julito, who worked as his assistant in 2009-10, died from complications of pneumonia in 2015.

== See also ==
- List of Puerto Ricans
