= Jimmy Thordsen =

Puerto Rican basketball player

Jimmy Thordsen (born 23 July 1948) is a former Puerto Rican basketball player who competed in the 1972 Summer Olympics and in the 1976 Summer Olympics.
