= Mets de Guaynabo (basketball) =

Professional basketball team in Puerto Rico

- Nickname: Metropolitanos ("Metropolitans")
- League: Baloncesto Superior Nacional
- Founded: 1935
- History: Cangrejeros de Santurce (1935–1976); Conquistadores de Guaynabo (2007-2010); Mets de Guaynabo (1976–2000; 2010-2013, 2015, 2020–present)
- Stadium: Mario Morales Coliseum
- Capacity: 5,500
- Location: Guaynabo, Puerto Rico
- Team colors: Navy, white, cyan
- Head coach: Jorge Rincón
- Team captain: Jaysean Paige
- Ownership: Marc D. Grossman; Mark Linder
- Championships: 3 (1980, 1982, 1989)
- Retired numbers: 5, 9, 15
- Website: https://metsbasketball.com/
Home	Away	Third

The Guaynabo Mets are a Puerto Rican professional basketball team based in Guaynabo, Puerto Rico, competing in the Baloncesto Superior Nacional (BSN), the island's premier basketball league, as part of its East Division.

Originally founded in 1935 as the Cangrejeros of Santurce, the franchise relocated to Guaynabo in 1976, adopting the Mets moniker due to the city's metropolitan location.The Mets play their home games at Mario Morales Coliseum, named after Mets legend Mario "Quijote" Morales, a legendary player who guided the Mets to three BSN championships in the 1980s (1980, 1982, and 1989). The Mets reached the finals in 1978, 1980, 1981, 1982, 1983, 1985, 1989, 1990, 1993 and 2021.

== Team history ==
Under the leadership of seasoned coach Julio Toro, the Mets achieved a level of excellence that led them to win three championships: in 1980, 1982, and 1989. These titles were marked by the leadership of Mario "Quijote" Morales, a legendary forward whose on-court skill and off-court charisma made him the face of the franchise. Alongside him, players like Federico "Fico" López brought talent and depth to the team, creating a chemistry that propelled them to several additional finals appearances.

1980: This marked the first championship for the Mets in their new home after relocating from Santurce. Under the guidance of coach Julio Toro, the team showcased a strong roster led by Mario "Quijote" Morales, whose scoring ability and leadership were pivotal. The Mets defeated their opponents in the finals, establishing themselves as a rising force in the BSN and setting the stage for their successful decade.

1982: Two years later, the Mets claimed their second title, further solidifying their dominance in the 1980s. With Julio Toro still at the helm and Morales continuing to shine, the team displayed exceptional teamwork and defensive prowess. This championship came after a hard-fought series, highlighting their consistency and ability to perform under pressure against the league's top competition.

1989: The Mets' third championship arrived at the end of the decade, capping off a remarkable run. Mario Morales remained the cornerstone of the team, supported by a talented supporting cast. This victory was particularly significant as it came after several near-misses in the finals earlier in the decade (1981, 1983, and 1985), proving the team's resilience and determination to reclaim the BSN crown.

=== Conquistadores de Guaynabo ===
Basketball in Guaynabo has deep roots, particularly associated with the Mets de Guaynabo, a historic franchise that began in 1935 as the Cangrejeros de Santurce and moved to Guaynabo in 1976. The Mets dominated the league in the 1980s, winning championships in 1980, 1982, and 1989. However, in the early 2000s, the Mets faced financial difficulties that led to their hiatus, leaving a void in Guaynabo's representation in the BSN. In this context, the Conquistadores de Guaynabo emerged as a response to the need to keep basketball alive in the city. In November 2005, after the temporary disappearance of the Mets, the Gallitos de Isabela franchise was relocated to Guaynabo at the initiative of then-mayor Héctor O'Neill García. This team adopted the name Conquistadores de Guaynabo, marking the return of high-level basketball to the city under a new identity. The Conquistadores debuted in the 2006 BSN season, with Julio César Vega Acosta as their first team owner and later Jorge Cátala Monge. Despite the initial enthusiasm, the Conquistadores could not replicate the historic success of the Mets. During their existence, the team faced both sporting and administrative challenges. The Conquistadores did win any titles nor reach the BSN finals, and its tenure in the league was relatively short-lived. In 2009, after resolving issues related to the rights to the Guaynabo franchise name, it was decided to reinstate the "Mets" name for all the city's sports franchises, marking the end of the Conquistadores as an active entity in the BSN. That year, the Mets were reestablished, replacing the Conquistadores and reviving the more iconic name. Although the Conquistadores did not leave a deep mark in terms of championships or sporting achievements, their existence served as a temporary bridge to keep professional basketball alive in Guaynabo. After their dissolution in 2009, the Mets returned and continued competing in the BSN.

=== Return as an expansion team ===
On November 22, 2019, league officials announced the first expansion team since 1993 would be established in the San Juan area. Owners Marc Grossman and Mark Linder initially eyed Roberto Clemente Coliseum as the home court for their new team, but San Juan's Mayor Carmen Yulin Cruz expressed concerns the team wouldn't be able to play a full season at the venue due to previously scheduled events. Grossman and Linder then decided to revive the Mets de Guaynabo, five years after the original team left Guaynabo.

The team reintroduced themselves on December 17, 2019, in a press conference with Grossman, former Puerto Rico national basketball team general manager Alfredo Morales, Guaynabo Mayor Angel Perez Otero, and BSN President Ricardo Dalmau. During the press conference, team officials revealed the new team, the league's tenth, signed its first free agent, Angel Alamo. Alamo was a 34-year-old forward who had played previously for the Mets in 2012 and 2013. The team also selected four players in an expansion draft on November 22, 2019, and received the 11th pick in the January 15, 2020 draft.

=== Recent years (2020–present) ===
The 2020 season in the Baloncesto Superior Nacional (BSN) marked the Mets return to the league after a five-year absence, having been reinstated with new ownership in 2019. The season, delayed and condensed due to the COVID-19 pandemic, was played in a "bubble" format in Puerto Rico, starting in November 2020. The Mets showed promise in their comeback year, finishing the regular season with a competitive record and securing a spot in the playoffs. They advanced to the semifinals, a significant achievement for a team reestablishing itself, but their run ended with a 2–1 series loss to the Vaqueros de Bayamón, falling just short of their first BSN Finals appearance since 1993. The semifinal defeat came in a close Game 3, with Bayamón edging out a 79–76 victory. Key performances from players like David Stockton, who led with 40 points in a crucial regular season win, highlighted the Mets' potential, setting the stage for their stronger showings in subsequent years. Overall, the 2020 season was a bittersweet but encouraging return for the Mets, blending a rollercoaster of challenges with a solid foundation for future success.

2021 season: Building on their semifinal appearance in 2020, the Mets showcased resilience and talent, ultimately reaching the BSN Finals.

In the regular season, the Mets finished with a strong 21–11 record, placing them among the league's top teams and securing a favorable playoff seed. Their postseason run began with a quarterfinal matchup against the Leones de Ponce, whom they defeated 4–2 in a six-game series. A standout moment came in Game 6, when captain Jonathan Han hit a dramatic half-court buzzer-beater to clinch an 83–80 victory with the score tied at 80-80 and less than six seconds remaining—an iconic play that propelled them forward.

In the semifinals, the Mets faced the Vaqueros de Bayamón, the team that had eliminated them in 2020. This time, they pushed the series to seven games, splitting the first six with notable performances, including a 101–93 win in Game 2 led by Han's 20 points. Despite Han's hamstring injury sidelining him late in the series, the Mets prevailed 4-3, advancing to the Finals for the first time since 1993.

In the BSN Finals, the Mets met the Capitanes de Arecibo, a formidable opponent led by Walter Hodge. The series was competitive, with Guaynabo splitting the first two games—Arecibo won Game 1 (86-80), while the Mets took Game 2 (91-86). However, Arecibo gained momentum, winning Games 3 and 4 (85-71 and 96-85), putting the Mets on the brink. Guaynabo fought back with an 85–75 victory in Game 5, narrowing the series to 3-2, but Arecibo sealed the championship in Game 6 with a 90–79 win, taking the title 4-2.

The 2021 season was a breakthrough for the Mets, finishing as runners-up in their deepest playoff run since the early 1990s.

The 2022 season was a step back from their impressive 2021 Finals run, marked by inconsistency and a failure to reach the playoffs. After finishing as runners-up the previous year, the Mets entered 2022 with high expectations under head coach Brad Greenberg but struggled to replicate their prior success. The Mets were unable to maintain the momentum from their 2021 semifinal and Finals appearances. Key players like Jonathan Han, Renaldo Balkman, and Tyquan Rolón remained on the roster, but the team's cohesion faltered, and they finished outside the postseason picture. This disappointing outcome prompted adjustments in subsequent years, including the high-profile signing of DeMarcus Cousins in 2023, as the Mets sought to reclaim their competitive edge. The 2022 season thus stands as a rare stumble in the franchise's otherwise strong resurgence.

The Mets acquired DeMarcus Cousins, a former NBA All-Star center just in time for the 2023 season, marking a significant moment for the franchise. Announced on April 11, 2023, Cousins signed with the team as a free agent at the age of 32, aiming to use the stint as a steppingstone to return to the NBA after going unsigned for the 2022–23 season. The Mets, recognizing his pedigree, brought him on board for the spring season, with team co-owner Marc Grossman praising Cousins as "one of the best basketball players of his generation" whose skills, particularly his ability to shoot and stretch the floor, would fit well in the BSN's fast-paced style.

Cousins' impact on the Mets during his 2023 tenure was notable both on and off the court. He delivered impressive statistical performances, averaging 20.4 points, 10.9 rebounds, and 4.5 assists per game in 25.48 minutes, while shooting an efficient 44% from beyond the three-point line and 69% from the free-throw line. His presence elevated the team's competitiveness, guiding them to the BSN playoffs and into the semifinals. However, their championship hopes were dashed by the Gigantes de Carolina, who eliminated the Mets in a hard-fought seven-game series. Cousins suffered an injury early in Game 6, sidelining him for about a week and potentially affecting the team's late-series momentum, though he had already left a strong mark on their postseason run.

Overall, the 2023 season was a success for the Mets, marking their second semifinal appearance in three years since their 2019 reinstatement. Cousins' impact, alongside contributions from veterans and emerging talent, solidified their status as a BSN contender, though they couldn't reclaim the Finals glory of 2021.

In August 2023, J. J. Barea, a 14-year NBA veteran and 2011 champion with the Dallas Mavericks, was announced as the new head coach of the Guaynabo Mets.

In the 2024 season, the Mets continued to build on their competitive standing, though specific results remain incomplete as of early 2025. Their most recent documented game prior to the season's conclusion was a loss in game 6 of the playoffs to the Leones de Ponce (87-70), reflecting ongoing challenges against top-tier BSN teams. Over these four seasons, the Guaynabo Mets have solidified their return to prominence in Puerto Rican basketball, balancing playoff appearances with periods of adjustment under head coach Barea.

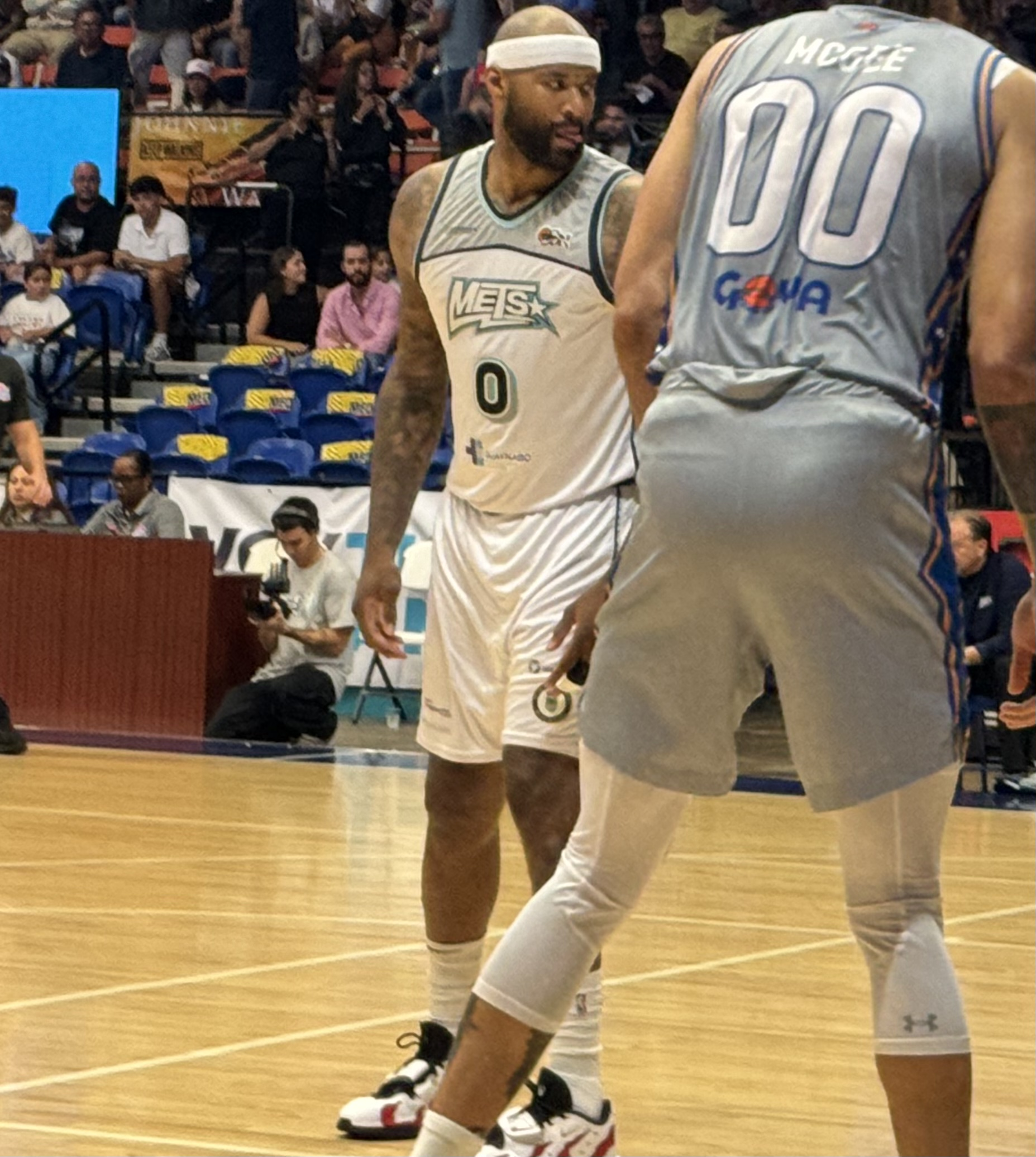
DeMarcus Cousins matched up against JaVale McGee, in a game of Guaynabo vs Bayamón on May 16, 2025.

The 2025 season began with Barea as head coach. Despite early successes, such as the win against Arecibo with the return of Cousins, Barea's tenure ended after an 8–10 run. On May 8, 2025, he was informed by one of the team's owners that he had been fired, a decision that left him disappointed as he wished to complete the season. American Josh King was announced as the new head coach for the rest of the season. King couldn't turn things around, 5-11, and the Mets finished with a regular season record of 13 wins and 21 losses, placing them 5th in Division A standing and not reaching the play-offs. This record reflects a .382 winning percentage (13/34 games), indicating a challenging season with inconsistent performances especially on the defensive side. The team averaged 95.03 points scored per game and allowed 97.0.

==== 2026: Temporary relocation due to Mario Morales Coliseum renovation ====
In December 2025, the Mets de Guaynabo announced that the team would relocate its home games for the entire 2026 Baloncesto Superior Nacional season while the Coliseo Mario Morales underwent a major renovation beginning in January 2026.

For the duration of the renovations, the franchise confirmed the Coliseo Fernando "Rube" Hernández in Gurabo, Puerto Rico, as its primary home venue for the 2026 season. Team officials stated that Gurabo was selected in order to remain as close as possible to the Guaynabo fan base while ensuring compliance with league requirements.

The relocation coincided with organizational changes, including adjustments to the team's front office and technical staff ahead of the 2026 campaign.

Additionally, the Mets evaluated the possibility of hosting select home games in other venues within the metropolitan area, including San Juan, Puerto Rico, to maintain accessibility for their supporters during the temporary move.

Municipal authorities indicated that the renovation of the Mario Morales Coliseum would include improvements to infrastructure, seating, and fan amenities, with completion expected after the conclusion of the 2026 season.

The Mets de Guaynabo concluded the 2026 BSN season with a 14-20 record, finishing 10th overall in the league and missing the playoffs for the second consecutive year. The team was unable to sustain consistent results throughout the regular season, leading to its elimination before the postseason.

Off the court, the organization faced significant challenges related to BSN salary cap and luxury tax compliance. The league determined that the franchise had violated its Collective Salary Cap and Luxury Tax regulations, resulting in a $50,000 fine, the forfeiture of its 2027 draft selections, and a prohibition on using its three import players for the final three games of the regular season.

== Season-by-season record ==
Note: GP = Games played, W = Wins, L = Losses, W–L% = Winning percentage

Season	GP	W	L	W–L%	Finish	Playoffs
2019–20	11	5	6	45%	8th	Lost in Semifinals 1-2 (Bayamon)
2021	32	17	15	53%	3rd A	Lost in Final 2-4 (Capitanes de Arecibo)
2022	32	14	18	44%	5th A	Did not qualify
2023	36	21	15	58%	2nd A	Lost in Semifinals 3-4 (Carolina)
2024	34	21	13	62%	1st A	Lost in Quarterfinals 2-4 (Ponce)
2025	34	13	21	38%	5th A	Did not qualify
2026	34	14	20	41%	6th A	Did not qualify

== Team roster ==
Mets de Guaynabo roster
Players
Coaches

Pos.	No.	Nat.	Name	Ht.	Wt.	Age
SG	55	(Puerto Rico) (United States)	Ayala, Eric	6 ft 5 in (1.96 m)	200 lb (91 kg)	27 – 2 January 1999
SF	21	(Puerto Rico) (United States)	Grafals, GianFranco	6 ft 5 in (1.96 m)	190 lb (86 kg)	26 – 13 June 2000
G	6	(Puerto Rico) (United States)	Paige, Jaysean	6 ft 2 in (1.88 m)	200 lb (91 kg)	32 – 30 July 1994
PF	4	(United States)	Romer, J. J.	6 ft 9 in (2.06 m)	205 lb (93 kg)	26 – 9 December 1999
C	28	(Cuba) (Puerto Rico)	Romero, Ismael (C)	6 ft 9 in (2.06 m)	220 lb (100 kg)	35 – 23 June 1991
PG		(Puerto Rico)	Walker, Johned	5 ft 11 in (1.80 m)	173 lb (78 kg)	23 – May 20, 2003
PG		(Puerto Rico)	Abreu, Alex	5 ft 11 in (1.80 m)		35 – 14 August 1991

Head coach

- (Puerto Rico) Jorge Rincón

Legend

- (C) Team captain
- (DC) Dual citizenship
- (I) Import player
- Injured

- Roster
Updated: 6 November 2026

== Depth chart ==
Pos.	Starting 5	Bench 1	Bench 2
C			J. J. Romer
PF	Ismael Romero
SF		Eric Ayala	GianFranco Grafals
SG	Jaysean Paige
PG

== Team identity ==
=== Team legends ===
Mario Morales and Federico "Fico" López had their jersey numbers retired by the team, and the official ceremony honoring their careers took place on November 4, 2021. During a halftime event in Game 6 of the 2021 semifinals against the Vaqueros de Bayamón at the Mario Morales Coliseum, the Mets raised banners to commemorate their contributions. Morales, who wore number 15, and López, who wore number 5, saw their numbers officially retired, ensuring no future Mets player could use them. Morales was present for the recognition, while López, who died on November 6, 2006, was represented by his family. This event celebrated their pivotal roles in the Mets' three championships (1980, 1982, and 1989) and their lasting legacy with the franchise. On May 20, 2024 José Sosa's number 9 was retired and honored along with Morales and López

== Notable players and coaches ==
=== Franchise legends ===
- Mario "Quijote" Morales (born 1957; 1977–1998) — The greatest player in franchise history; the home arena is named in his honor. Led all three BSN championships.
- Federico "Fico" López Camacho (born 1962; 1981–1997) — Elite playmaking guard and key figure in the dynasty era. Died November 6, 2006.
- José Sosa (born 1959; 1977–1986) — Shooting guard central to the championship runs; number retired May 20, 2024.
- Francisco "Papiro" León (born 1961; 1979–1984, 1999) — Beloved forward during the dynastic era.

=== Modern era ===
- Renaldo Balkman (born 1984; 2020–2024) — Former NBA forward (New York Knicks, 2006 1st round); key contributor to the 2021 Finals run.
- DeMarcus Cousins (born 1990; 2023, 2025) — Four-time NBA All-Star; averaged 20.4 PPG, 10.9 RPG, and 4.5 APG in 2023.

== Arena ==
The Mets play home games at the Mario Morales Coliseum in Guaynabo (capacity: 5,500), named after franchise legend Mario "Quijote" Morales. For the 2026 BSN season, the team temporarily relocated to the Coliseo Fernando "Rube" Hernández in Gurabo while the arena undergoes infrastructure, seating, and amenity renovations expected to be completed after the 2026 season.

=== Retired numbers ===
The Mets have retired 3 jersey numbers:

Mets de Guaynabo retired numbers
No.	Player	Position	Tenure	Ceremony date
15	Mario Morales	F	1977-1998	November 11, 2021
5	Federico López	G	1981-1997	November 11, 2021
9	José Sosa	SG	1977-1986	May 20, 2024

=== Head coaches ===
- Julio Toro — Architect of the golden era; led all three BSN championships (1980, 1982, 1989).
- J. J. Barea (2024–2025) — 14-year NBA veteran and 2011 champion with the Dallas Mavericks.
- Jorge Rincón (2026–present) — Current head coach.

=== Notable players ===
- (Puerto Rico) Mario "Quijote" Morales (born 1957) (1977–1998)
- (Puerto Rico) Federico López Camacho (born 1962) (1981–1997)
- (Puerto Rico) José Sosa (born 1959) (1977–1986)
- (Puerto Rico) Francisco "Papiro" León (born 1961) (1979-1984, 1999)
- (Puerto Rico) Renaldo Balkman (born 1984) (2020–2024)
- (United States) DeMarcus Cousins (born 1990) (2023, 2025)
