= Ángel Santiago =

Puerto Rican basketball player

Ángel "Cachorro" Santiago del Valle (born July 3, 1956 in Río Piedras, Puerto Rico) is a Puerto Rican former professional basketball player who played for 24 seasons in the Baloncesto Superior Nacional (BSN), competing for various teams, including the Cangrejeros de Santurce, the Guaynabo Mets, the Cardenales de Río Piedras, the Leones de Ponce, the Polluelos de Aibonito, the Brujos de Guayama, and the Capitanes de Arecibo. He won one BSN championship, in 1986, and competed at various international tournaments with the Puerto Rico men's national basketball team, earning medals at some of those tournaments. Santiago won a silver medal at the 1979 Pan American Games, held in San Juan, Puerto Rico, with the Puerto Rican men's national basketball squad. He also won a bronze medal at the Pan American Games' 1987 edition.

== Professional basketball career ==
As a 16 year old in early 1973, Santiago was signed by the Cangrejeros de Santurce from Santurce, Puerto Rico, a suburb that lies inside San Juan. He played in 10 games, scoring 25 points, with 11 rebounds and one assist, for per-game totals of 2.5, 1.1 and 0.1, respectively.

Over the next three years, Santiago's averages went steadily up, except for a dip in scoring and rebounding averages in 1976. He scored 8.4 points per game, grabbed 6.0 rebounds per game and passed for 0.2 assists in 1974, scoring 13.4 points per game while recording 7.8 rebounds and 0.4 assists per game in 1975, and 9.8 points, 6.0 rebounds and 0.5 assists per game in 1976.

The Cangrejeros moved to the city of Guaynabo before the 1977 season; Santiago had been joined by another future Puerto Rican league superstar in Mario Morales during the 1974 season; the pair would play together for five years.

The 1977 BSN season began a streak of 17 seasons in a row in which Santiago would average double-figures in scoring, including a stretch, from 1980 to 1989, in which Santiago scored more than 20 points per game during ten straight seasons. During this time, Santiago and Morales, alongside others such as Georgie Torres, Federico Lopez, Angelo Cruz, Ruben Rodriguez, Jerome Mincy, Willie Quinones, Mario Butler, Rolando Frazer, Jose Ortiz, Julio Gallardo and others became well known celebrities in Puerto Rico.

In 1977, Santiago averaged 17.3 points, 7.8 rebounds and 1.3 assists per game in 31 games played with the Mets. He followed that with averages of 18.6, 9.3 and 0.9 in 1978. The 1979 BSN season saw Santiago accumulate 15 points, 7.1 rebounds and 1.4 assists per game for the Guaynabo team. That same year (1979) Santiago earned a silver medal at the 1979 Pan American Games held in San Juan.

Before the 1980 BSN season started, "Cachorro" Santiago was traded to the Cardenales de Rio Piedras, a team in another area of San Juan city, Rio Piedras. The 1980 season began Santiago's streak of ten years in a row in which he scored over 20 points a game, when he scored 25.8, while rebounding 9.4 and assisting 1.7 times a game also. He followed the 1980 season with a 1981 season in which he posted his highest numbers in points per game scored for his career at 28.7 points per game along with posting his first double-figures average in rebounds at 11.1 and assisting 1.4 times a game. During 1982, his numbers were 23.4 points, 9.6 rebounds and 1.1 assist a game.

Santiago was once again traded, before the 1983 season began, to the Ponce Lions, a then struggling team in the southern Puerto Rico city of Ponce. He played with the Lions for two seasons (those being the 1983 and 1984 BSN seasons), again posting stellar per game numbers, at 23.8 points, 8.2 rebounds and 1.9 assists in 1983 and 22.6 points, 8.3 rebounds and 1.3 assists per game in 1984, before, once again, being traded, this time to the Polluelos de Aibonito, in a city just north of Ponce, Aibonito.

=== Polluelos de Aibonito era ===
The Polluelos de Aibonito were building a team that would compete for championships during the next few years when Santiago arrived in Aibonito. In 1985, Santiago contributed with 23.8 points, 8.2 rebounds and 2.1 assists a game for the surging, southern Puerto Rican team, where he shared playing responsibilities with Rolando Frazer and Enrique Aponte, among others.

After the 1985 BSN season ended, the Polluelos obtained Criollos de Caguas point-guard Willie Melendez, forming a sort of "big three" tandem in Aibonito which was made up of Santiago, Frazer and Melendez, with Aponte as a major, fourth contributor. The team was now coached by another former member of the Puerto Rico men's national basketball team, Charlie Bermudez. The 1986 Aibonito Polluelos were the first team in the franchise's history to reach the BSN Finals and they won the franchise's first and ultimately, only, national championship by defeating the defending champions, Jose "Piculin" Ortiz, Bobby Rios and their Atleticos de San German in seven games, with a Game Seven final score of 94-92.

The Polluelos aimed at repeating as national champions during the 1987 BSN season; Santiago helped the team with 24.2 points, 8.0 rebounds and 2.3 assists per game. The team returned to the finals that year, but this time, they lost. In another close finals, the Polluelos lost in seven games to the Titanes de Morovis that were led by Wesley Correa and Mario Butler, with a Game Seven score of 100 to 92 in favor of the Titanes.

In 1987, Santiago won his second Pan American Games medal, this time a bronze one.

Santiago continued his prolific production numbers during the 1988 season while the Polluelos once again returned to the BSN playoffs: he collaborated with 25.4 points, 8.5 rebounds and 2.4 assists a game that season.

For 1989, Santiago averaged 24.6 points, 6.9 rebounds and 1.5 assists a game for the Polluelos, who once again were contenders for the BSN championship despite not winning it (Santiago's old teammate, Morales, and team, the Mets, won it instead). 1989 also marked the tenth season in a row in which "Cachorro" Santiago scored 20 or more points a game, and the last season he did so.

=== Brujos de Guayama, back to the Polluelos ===
Santiago then played for the Brujos de Guayama, a team that made another southern Puerto Rico city, Guayama, its home-town. He played 21 games for the Brujos, at a time where his age (33-34 years old) was already starting to make an effect on his playing ability and so his scoring average per game lowered to 16.8, while catching 5.9 rebounds and passing for 1.5 assists per game. In 1991, Santiago and the Brujos made it to the Finals (Santiago returning, the Brujos making it for the first time) where they lost to Jose Ortiz, Eddie Casiano and the San German Athletics in seven games, by a seventh game score of 88-83). Santiago was returned to the Polluelos for the last eight games of the 1990 BSN season, and he scored 14.8 points, with 4.8 rebounds and 2.1 assists per game for the Polluelos.

=== Rest of career ===
Santiago returned to the Brujos for the 1991 BSN season. He kept his streak of seasons scoring in double-figures on a per-game basis alive, with 14.1 points a game along with 4.5 rebounds and 0.7 assists, but his best years were by now clearly behind him. In 1992, his averages were 14.3 points, 4.5 rebounds and 1.1 assists per game.

Santiago's last season with the Brujos was the 1993 one, during which he scored 7.1 points a game, with 3.1 rebounds and 0.3 assists per game also, after which he retired before the 1994 season, then returning briefly to the Leones de Ponce in 1995. That season (1993) was his first in 18 seasons where his scoring average dipped below 10 points a game.

In 1995, he only played in six games for the Leones, with averages of 5.8 points, 3.0 rebounds and 0.3 assists for the Leones.

Santiago finished his career with the Capitanes of the northern city of Arecibo. He completed a full season of thirty games, averaging 5.0 points, with 2.7 rebounds and 0.5 assists a game in 1996.

== Career in review ==
Santiago was a one time BSN national champion. He was a member of the exclusive, 5,000 points club and of the even more exclusive, 10,000 points club in Puerto Rico, with 11,287 points scored, and he collected 4,447 rebounds and had 778 assists in 617 regular season BSN games played. He was also a dependable three-point shooter, making 35 percent of the three points shots taken during his career, while also making 54 percent of his field goals attempted and 73 percent of his free throws.

His career per-game averages were of 18.3 points, 7.2 rebounds and 1.3 assists a contest.

== Hall of Fame ==
Santiago was elected to the Rio Piedras' sports hall of fame.

== See also ==
- List of Puerto Ricans
- Jose Alicea Mirabal - who was signed to a BSN team at age 12
- Eddie Casiano - who was signed to a BSN team at age 15
