= Willie Meléndez =

Puerto Rican basketball player

Wilfredo "Willie" Melendez Velez (also known as "Wilito" Melendez) is an American-Puerto Rican former professional basketball player who played in the BSN league from 1974 to 1992. He is also a school teacher, having taught at his adoptive city Cayey's Benigno Fernandez Garcia Middle School during his heyday as a professional basketball player.

== Professional basketball career ==
Melendez, born in Columbus, Georgia, debuted as a professional basketball player with the Santos de San Juan, a defunct BSN franchise from San Juan. During his first season as a BSN player, he did not see much action, participating in only eight games and scoring fifteen points for an average of 1.9 points per game. The next three seasons, his numbers did not improve much; however, that changed when, during 1977, now as a player of the Brujos de Guayama in Guayama, he participated in 29 games, netting 295 points while shooting for 131 shots made out of 264 taken, averaging 10.2 points per game, with an average of slightly under 50% of his shots made. Brujos coaching entrusted him with the team's starting point guard position, and he averaged 19.4 points per game in 33 games during 1978 and 22.2 points per game in 1979 while making nearly 50% of his shots during the 63 games played by him with the Brujos in that era.

The average of 22.2 points a game during the 1979 season was the highest average Melendez would reach during his BSN career.

Melendez was traded north to the Criollos de Caguas before the 1980 season. He spent six seasons in Caguas, and the Criollos experienced their first winning season as a team with him as point guard, reaching the BSN's semi-finals in 1985. During his period as a member of the Criollos, Melendez increased his ability to assist other players in scoring, going from 65 assists in 1980, to 138 in 1981, and never achieving less than 129 assists from 1981 up until he was traded to the Polluelos de Aibonito. His scoring was also consistent, as he averaged 10.2 or more points a game with the Criollos from 1980 to 1985, his point average as a member of the Criollos topping at 15.4 during 1985.

A productive player as a member of the Criollos, Melendez was then traded to the Polluelos de Aibonito after the 1985 season. The Polluelos were building a team that could contend for titles during the late '80s, and they had Angel Santiago, Enrique Aponte and Rolando Frazer, to whom Melendez could feed the ball during plays. The Melendez-Frazer duo is one of the best remembered in Puerto Rican basketball history. (in Spanish). During his first season as a Polluelo, Melendez scored 14.0 points a game, fed for 6.9 assists (surpassing the 200 assists in one season for the first time in his career with 229, Melendez led the BSN league in assists that year) and grabbed 2.5 rebounds a game while shooting 57% from the field, 42% from the three point line and 77% from the free throws line, helping the Polluelos win their first, and, as of 2021, only league championship by beating the defending champions, Jose Ortiz, Bobby Rios and the Atleticos de San German in seven games during the BSN Finals.

During the 1987 season, the defending champions Polluelos continued being a viable contender to repeat as titleholders, but Melendez's personal numbers decreased a little bit. He scored 11 points a game, handling 5.8 assists and catching 2.2 rebounds per game, while shooting 46% from the field, 36% from the three point line and 70% from the free throw line. The Polluelos returned to the BSN Finals, where they were defeated by the Titanes de Morovis in seven games. However, Melendez's numbers climbed again during the 1988 season, when he scored 16.9 points a game, with 209 assists for an average of 6.3 per game and 70 rebounds for 2.1 a game in the rebounding category. The Polluelos reached the playoffs but were eliminated during the quarterfinals. In 1989, Melendez played during 30 games, scoring 327 points, assisting 170 times and rebounding 60 times for averages of 10.9, 5.7 and 2.0, respectively.

Between 1990 and 1991, Melendez was traded three times between the Aibonito Polluelos and the Vaqueros de Bayamon in the northern Puerto Rican city of Bayamon. His production numbers decreased as he was getting older and playing against younger competition; nevertheless he completed a 30-game season during 1990 between Aibonito and Bayamon, averaging a total of 9.2 points per game, with 3.9 assists and 2.1 rebounds a game. He returned to the Polluelos for the season's final ten games.

He played 19 games for the Vaqueros in 1991, scoring 47 points for an average of 2.5 points per game, 1.6 assists and 1.1 rebounds. His points total was his lowest since his 1977 season with the Guayama Brujos, and his assists total his lowest since 1976 with the Santos de San Juan, when he averaged 0.3 assists per game.

Melendez returned to the Caguas Criollos for his last season as an active player in the BSN. There, he played 29 games, once again lifting his per game numbers, as he scored 309 points for an average of 10.9, with 129 assists (4.4 a game) and 53 rebounds (an average of 1.8 rebounds a game).

== Career numbers ==
Melendez retired as a member of an exclusive group of Puerto Rican players to have scored over 5,000 points during his BSN career (5,000 or more points scorers being considered an exclusive group since the BSN seasons consists usually of between 30 and 33 games only; a handful of players have reached that number of points in Puerto Rican professional basketball history) having scored 6,312 points for an average of 12.2 points a game, with 2,115 assists for an average of 4.1 and 1,070 rebounds, averaging 2.1 rebounds a game. He is a one time BSN champion, having won the 1986 title with the Polluelos de Aibonito.

== See also ==
Some Puerto Rican basketball players of the same era:

- Wesley Correa
- Angelo Cruz
- Federico Lopez
- Mario Morales
- Ramon Ramos
- Ramon Rivas
- Ruben Rodriguez
- Willie Quiñones - Melendez's team mate in Caguas
- List of Puerto Ricans
