= Mario Butler =

Panamanian basketball player

Personal information
- Born: January 15, 1957 (age 69) Panama City, Panama
- Listed height: 6 ft 8 in (2.03 m)
- Listed weight: 275 lb (125 kg)

Career information
- College: Briar Cliff (1977–1979)
- NBA draft: 1979: 8th round, 155th overall pick
- Drafted by: Golden State Warriors
- Playing career: 1980–2008
- Position: Center
- Number: 50

Career highlights
- FIBA Intercontinental Cup champion (1983); 5× BSN champion (1987, 1999, 2000, 2001, 2005); BSN Most Valuable Player (1988); 7× BSN Defensive Player of the Year (1984, 1985, 1987, 1988, 1991, 1993, 1994)

Career BSN statistics
- Points: 12,252 (15.7 ppg)
- Rebounds: 8,236 (10.6 rpg)
- Assists: 612 (0.8 apg)
- Stats at Basketball Reference
Medals
Representing Panama
Men's basketball
Centrobasket
| Gold medal – first place | 1981 San Juan |

Mario Alberto Butler Graham (born January 15, 1957) is a Panamanian retired professional basketball player.

Butler spent most of his career playing in the Baloncesto Superior Nacional (BSN) in Puerto Rico. At 6 ft 8 in, he played center and was known for his rebounding skills. He is the BSN all-time rebounding leader with 8,236 rebounds.

== Panama ==
Butler grew up on the streets of Panama City, where he picked up the game of basketball at around the age of 9. Butler quickly became famous around his neighborhood for his abilities, and he eventually earned a scholarship to an American university and a spot on the Panama national basketball team.

He studied at Briar Cliff College in Sioux City, Iowa, where he befriended another Panamanian and future basketball legend in Puerto Rico, Rolando Frazer. Butler and Frazer, had played together with Panama's national team; away from home, however, they were also able to establish a friendship. Mario graduated in 1979 and was an integral part of Briar Cliff's famous Panama Pipeline. He played in 102 games during his career, scoring 815 points and totaling 664 rebounds, which ranked 14th and seventh all-time, respectively, at the time of his graduation. He shot 55.4 percent for his career and averaged 12.0 points per game as a senior, while leading the team with 9.4 rebounds per game. Butler played on teams which produced the best four-year record in school history (91–24), reaching the NAIA tournament all four years which were also the first four national tournaments in program history. He helped the Cliff to one Sweet 16 and one Elite 8. He was inducted into the Briar Cliff Athletic Hall of Fame in 2016.

== Puerto Rico ==
In 1979, Genaro Marchand, then president of the BSN, attended the Pan American Games, held in San Juan. The Puerto Rican basketball leader was so impressed by Butler and Frazer's playing that he decided to carry out a special draft in 1980, and Butler was chosen by the Morovis Titans, while Frazer went to the Polluelos of Aibonito.

Butler, alongside teammates Wesley Correa and Mario Sanchez, brought instant respectability to the Titans. During that era, games were shown on Puerto Rico's national television almost daily (on weekends, twice a day) by WAPA-TV, helping Butler, Frazer, Mario Morales, Georgie Torres, Jerome Mincy and a number of other BSN players to become household names there. Despite being active in the BSN, Butler continued representing Panama at different international tournaments, but he was not able to participate at any Olympic Games; Panama never qualified for them during Butler's period with their national team.

In 1983, the Titans almost won the BSN's title, losing to Morales, Fico Lopez and the Guaynabo Mets during a seven-game semi-final series. The Titans repeated their regular season success from 1984 to 1986, only to fall short in the playoffs. But at the 1987 BSN finals, Butler and the Titans finally conquered the title, the franchise's first and so far, only, title, by beating the defending champions, Frazer and the Polluelos, by a score of 100–92 in game seven of the championship series. Correa, who was considered by many Puerto Ricans to be the best player on the Titans of that era, said "Me and the two Marios (Butler and Sanchez) have been working for so long that we deserved this title since a long time ago!". By then, Butler had been nicknamed by famous broadcaster Manolo Rivera Morales as "The Panamanian Express" and "The King of the Jungle".

After many other seasons with the Titans, Butler joined the Santurce Crabbers, where he played alongside José Ortiz and Carlos Arroyo, among others. Butler added three more championships to his resume when the Crabbers, who had begun a four championships in a row run in 1997, won the 1998, 1999 and 2000 titles.

After playing with the Crabbers, Butler joined the Carolina Giants, where he played until 2002. Then, he signed with the Titans again. In 2003, Butler broke the record for most games played in the BSN's history, and becoming half of the first father and son duo in Puerto Rico to play for the same team at the same time in the BSN, alongside Mario Jr.

Butler scored more than 12,000 points at the BSN, making him a member of the exclusive group of players to have scored 5,000 or more points in that league (as the league usually has a schedule of only 30 to 33 games per year, anyone who reaches 5,000 or more points there is generally considered as an all-time great by Puerto Ricans), and also joining the even more exclusive group of players with 10,000 or more points scored. He averaged 17 points per game over 23 years. He also collected more than 8,000 rebounds, for an average of almost 12 rebounds caught per game. Butler was the BSN's MVP in 1988, and the league's defensive player of the year in 1984, 1985, 1987, 1988, 1991, 1993 and 1994.

Mario Butler returned to basketball, lured by Yamil Chade, in time to win his fifth BSN basketball championship, this time with the Arecibo Captains during 2005.

== International career ==
Mario Butler also saw action in professional leagues of other countries besides Panama and Puerto Rico. He played as a professional in Brazil, Argentina, Colombia, the Dominican Republic, Ecuador, Italy, Mexico, Spain, the United States (though not in the NBA) and Venezuela.

One incident that Butler publicly admitted he probably will never forget happened while he was a player for the Aguascalientes team in Mexico: after the game's referees made a call that disgusted local fans, many fans jumped onto the court to fight Butler and his teammates. Others began tossing bottles and other items from the fan stands. Butler and his coach, fellow Puerto Rican Julio Toro, had to push some fans away in order to make it out of the arena, and they were formally accused by some fans of hitting them, but the Mexican police never charged them.

== National team career ==
Butler saw action for the Panama national team in other important tournaments apart from the Pan American games. These included the Central American and Caribbean Games, the Pre-Olympics and others. It was because of this international exposure that he, at 6 feet and 8 inches (80 inches) tall, became known by many basketball fans as one of the most dominant centers in the Spanish-speaking countries during his era as a basketball player.

== See also ==
- BSN
