= Wesley Correa =

American Puerto Rican professional basketball player

Wesley "Wes" Correa Crump (born April 16, 1962) is an American-Puerto Rican professional basketball player who played sixteen years in the Puerto Rican Baloncesto Superior Nacional league, all of them with the Titanes de Morovis franchise. Correa was also a member of the Puerto Rico men's national basketball team for many years and participated in a number of international competitions.

== Basketball career ==
Correa joined the BSN during that league's 1981 season, as a player for the Morovis Titans in the city of Morovis. That year, he played in 31 out of 33 scheduled games, scoring 535 points with 227 rebounds and 73 assists compiled, for averages of 17.3 points, 7.3 rebounds and 2.4 assists per game. In 1982, Correa played only 27 games but scored 493 points for an average of 18.3 points a game, but his averages on two other key departments, rebounds and assists, lowered as he only caught 152 rebounds and assisted 39 times, for averages of 5.6 and 1.4, respectively.

1983 began what was a streak of ten seasons in a row (excluding the 1988 season, see below) for Correa where he scored 20 points per game or more, when he scored 751 points for an average of 22.8 a game, along with 246 rebounds, (7.5 a game) and 59 assists (1.8 a game). During these ten seasons, the Titans became perennial playoff teams in the Puerto Rican league, as Correa was teamed with Mario Butler and Mario Sanchez among others. The 1983 season also marked the first time Correa competed in all 33 season games, the BSN season usually comprising between 30 and 33 games a season only. Next, in 1984, Correa scored 682 points with 201 rebounds and 59 assists, for averages of 23.5, 6.9 and 1.8, respectively.

In 1985, Correa scored 615 points and had 180 rebounds with 66 assists, for averages of 21.2, 6.2 and 2.3 in those categories, respectively. Correa's 1986 season saw a dramatic increase in points scored as he surpassed the 800 point mark in one season for the first time in his career as he scored 837 points, to go along with 213 rebounds and 72 assists, solidifying his status as an all star in the Puerto Rican league with averages of 27.9 points, 7.1 rebounds and 2.4 assists per game. 1987 was an even bigger year for Correa, as he scored 892 points, and had 267 rebounds and 97 assists, for averages of 29.7 points, 8.9 rebounds and 3.2 assists a game. That year he, Butler, Sanchez and Grimaldi Vidot led the Titanes to their first and only BSN national championship, when they beat the defending champions Polluelos de Aibonito in seven games at the BSN Finals, with a Game Seven score of 100-92. In Game Five of that series, Correa gave the Titans a 101-99 win by making a last second, buzzer beating shot as the game was tied at 99, to give the Titanes a 3-2 series lead. Around this era, Correa's name garnered further popularity around Puerto Rico when WAPA-TV's famous announcer, Manolo Rivera Morales, invented a phrase he used sometimes when Correa had the ball on his hands during Titanes televised basketball games, in which Rivera Morales would exclaim "Wes! Wes! Wes!" as Correa took a shot.

The Titanes hoped to repeat as champions during the 1988 BSN season, but largely due to Correa's personal problems, he was suspended for that season (as explained below) and they never won another championship.

In 1989, Correa returned to the Titans, surpassing the 900 points mark for the first time, with 926, and contributing 247 rebounds and 57 assists, for averages of 30.9, 8.0 and 1.9 respectively. 1990 saw him score 722 points and grab 203 rebounds while passing for 86 assists in 27 games, for a total of 26.7, 7.5 and 3.2 per game, respectively. During this era, Correa also played in a league that competed with the BSN, the Liga Puertorriquena de Baloncesto (Puerto Rican Basketball League, or LPB), as a member of the Ciales Valerosos team. He established that league's scoring record in 1990 with a 60 point game against the Peñuelas Caribes.

The 1991 BSN season saw Correa's scoring climb a bit as he scored 776 points but his numbers otherwise declined as he pulled 174 rebounds (staying short of the 200 rebounds mark for the first time in five seasons) and had 62 assists, 24 less than the year before, achieving averages of 26.8, 6.0 and 2.1, respectively, in 29 games played. 1992 was the first year since 1983 in which Correa played 33 games in a season for the Titanes, and he again surpassed 800 points, scoring 865 with 212 rebounds and 82 assists for averages of 26.2, 6.4 and 2.5 in those categories, but in 1993, at the age of 31 already, his numbers began a steady decline. That season, he had 626 points, 162 rebounds and 63 assists for averages of 20.9, 5.4 and 2.1, while 1994 saw those numbers drop to 546 points and 51 assists, albeit having a climb in rebounds to 185. He averaged 18.2 points, 6.2 rebounds and 1.7 assists a game in 1994. An injury in 1995, however, underlined Correa's career decline, as he was only able to play in 7 games, scoring 89 points with 36 rebounds and 15 assists for averages of 12.7, 5.1 and 2.1. 1996 saw him almost complete the Titans entire season as he participated in 24 games, for 318 points, 167 rebounds and 40 assists, with averages of 13.3, 7.0 and 1.7.

Correa announced his retirement as a professional basketball player after the 1996 BSN season but he had a brief return for the 1998 one. In his last campaign with the Titanes, he played 22 games, adding 197 points, 93 rebounds and 23 assists to his career totals, for averages of 9.0 points, 4.2 rebounds and 1 assist per game in his final BSN season.

=== 1988 suspension ===
Correa was suspended for the entirety of the 1988 BSN season for failing a doping test. He was about to participate with the Puerto Rican men's national basketball team at the 1987 Pan American Games in Indianapolis, Indiana when he was tested and his result came positive for a banned substance. He was also suspended from participating for the 1988 season with the Titanes.

== Career resume ==
Correa played 441 games during his BSN basketball career, scoring 9,870 points (making him a member of the exclusive, 5,000 plus BSN career points club) with 2,958 rebounds and 938 assists, averaging 22.4 points, 6.7 rebounds and 2.1 assists per game in his career. Also, at 49% of his field goal shots, 40% of his three point shots and 87% of his free throw shots made, Correa was an excellent shooter all around the basketball courts. He was a one time BSN champion, in 1987.

=== Puerto Rico men's national basketball team ===
During the mid to late 1980s, Correa was a perennial member of the Puerto Rico men's national basketball team whose other notable members included Federico Lopez, Georgie Torres, Mario Morales, Angelo Cruz and Piculin Ortiz. Correa participated, among other important tournaments, at the 1984 Tournament of the Americas, an Olympics qualifying tournament held in Sao Paulo, Brazil. His team did not advance to the 1984 Summer Olympic Games in Los Angeles, California.

== Later years ==
Late during October 2018, Correa suffered a tragedy in New York City, New York when his son, 35 years old Hasson Correa, was murdered by stabbing in an attack in which the former basketball player was also stabbed himself. Correa spent several days recuperating at a New York hospital, and he had no idea about Hasson's fate for several days. Some of his Titanes former teammates raised a number of fundraisers, which included one on the webpage GoFundMe and one organized by Mario Butler and backed by Morovis' mayor Carmen Maldonado González which was held at a local Morovis basketball court.

Correa suffered depression following the murder of his son, as well as physical problems stemming from his own stab wound.

== Personal ==
Apart from son Hasson, Correa has various other children.

== See also ==
- List of Puerto Ricans
