= Willie Quiñones =

Puerto Rican basketball player

Personal information
- Born: February 22, 1956 (age 70) Bayamón, Puerto Rico

Career information
- Playing career: 1976–1995
- Position: Forward

Career history
- 1976–1991: Criollos
- 1992: Maratonistas
- 1993: Gigantes
- 1994: Vaqueros
- 1994: Criollos
- 1995: Titanes
Medals
Men's basketball
Representing Puerto Rico
Pan American Games
| Silver medal – second place | 1979 San Juan | Team |

Jose "Willie" Quiñones Figueroa (born February 22, 1956) is a Puerto Rican former professional basketball player who played for 20 seasons on Puerto Rico's top professional basketball league, Baloncesto Superior Nacional, with the Criollos de Caguas, Maratonistas de Coamo, Vaqueros de Bayamon, Gigantes de Carolina and Titanes de Morovis basketball teams. He was also a member of the Puerto Rico men's national basketball team.

== Playing career ==
Quiñones debuted with the Criollos during 1976. That season, he played 32 games, scoring 503 points, with 304 rebounds and 26 assists for averages of 15.7, 10.6 and 0.8 respectively. He became a steady scorer during the late 70's, raising his per game points average to 23.6 by the 1978 season. He was also an adequate rebounder, pulling between 7.0 and 8.6 rebounds per game during this era. In 1978, Quiñones debuted with his country's men's national basketball team at the age of 22.

After his scoring average dipped slightly, from 21.5 points per game in 1979 to 19.9 points per game in 1980, Quiñones began, in 1981, a string of nine consecutive years in which he topped the 20 points per game average, at 24.0 in 1981, 22.3 in 1982, 27.1 in 1983, 24.1 in 1984, 23.8 in 1985, 23.4 in 1986 and 1987, 20.3 in 1988 and 22.2 in 1989. He became a star in the league at a time when he competed with other famous BSN players such as Quijote Morales, Piculin Ortiz and Ruben Rodriguez.

Between 1984 and 1991, Quiñones also became a threat from the three point shots line, shooting 50 percent in 1984, 33 percent in 1985 and 1986, 41 percent in 1987, 32 percent in 1989, 45 percent in 1990 and 35 percent in 1991. Despite his efforts and being teamed for a good portion of that time with point guard Willito Melendez, however, Quiñones could not help the Criollos' luck much, as they only made the playoffs sporadically and were hurt by a trade of Melendez to the Polluelos de Aibonito before the 1986 season. The Criollos, who had made the BSN playoffs in 1985, fell to 12–21 in 1986, 7–23 in 1987, 9–24 in 1988 and 10–20 in 1989.

Quiñones was reluctant to be traded from the Criollos; he was, however, traded to Coamo after the 1991 season. In Coamo, he played one season, scoring 229 points, along with 83 rebounds and 23 assists in 27 games. He then played for the Gigantes de Carolina in 1993 and the BSN leading championships winning team Vaqueros de Bayamon in 1994 before being traded back to the Criollos de Caguas that same season. Quiñones then retired after playing 16 games for the Titanes de Morovis in 1995.

== Career totals ==
Quiñones played in the BSN for twenty seasons. he competed in 579 games (BSN seasons being limited to between 30 and 33 games per year), scoring 11,012 points (making him a member of the exclusive group of players to have scored 5,000 points in a basketball career in the Puerto Rican league and a member of the even more exclusive, 10,000 points group) for an average of 19 points per game, with 3,604 rebounds for an average of 6.2 rebounds a game, and 781 assists, averaging 1.3 assists per game.

Quiñones was an excellent shooter from the field, as he took 7,222 field goal attempts in his career, making 4,175 of them, including 57 of 155 from behind the three-point line for percentages of 58 percent and 37 percent in those two categories, respectively. He also was slightly above average from the free throw line, as he made 2,491 out of 3,604 free throw attempts, for an average of 70 percent in that area.
