= Jose Alicea Mirabal =

Puerto Rican basketball player

Jose Alicea Mirabal (born February 6, 1967) is a Puerto Rican former professional basketball player. He played eleven seasons on the Baloncesto Superior Nacional league, from 1979 to 1993, excluding the 1984, 1985, 1988 and 1991 seasons.

Alicea Mirabal debuted at 12 years old with the BSN's Indios de Mayagüez. He was with Mayaguez from 1979 to 1983. He also played for the Brujos de Guayama (1986–87, 1989, he was a member of Guayama's 1986 team that notched a 2-31 record) the Morovis Titans (1990), the Capitanes de Arecibo (1992) and the Capitalinos de San Juan (1993).

Alicea Mirabal retired after the 1993 BSN season, with career averages of 1.0 assists, 1.3 rebounds and 3.8 points per game.
