= 2009 Baloncesto Superior Nacional season =

2009 BSN season
- League: Baloncesto Superior Nacional
- Sport: Basketball
- Duration: April 2009 - July 2009
- TV partner(s): CV24, Media sports tv, DirecTV

Draft
- Top draft pick: Darnell Hinson
- Picked by: Caciques de Humacao

Regular season
- Season MVP: Jesse Pellot (Atléticos de San Germán)
- Top scorer: Jesse Pellot (Atléticos de San Germán)

Playoffs
- Group A champions: Piratas de Quebradillas
- Group A runners-up: Gigantes de Carolina
- Group B champions: Vaqueros de Bayamon
- Group B runners-up: Indios de Mayagüez

Finals
- Champions: Vaqueros de Bayamon
- Runners-up: Piratas de Quebradillas
- Finals MVP: Christian Dalmau (Vaqueros de Bayamon)

Seasons
- ← 2008 2010 →

The 2009 BSN season was the 89th season of the Baloncesto Superior Nacional (BSN), the men's basketball league of Puerto Rico. It began in May 2009 and ended in August of the same year. This season saw the revival of an old rivalry, when in the finals the Vaqueros de Bayamon met with the Piratas de Quebradillas, with the Vaqueros winning.

== Regular season standings ==
BSN 2009 Standings
Pos	Team	Total Games	W	L
1	Capitanes de Arecibo	30	23	7
2	Piratas de Quebradillas	30	22	8
3	Cangrejeros de Santurce	30	21	9
4	Vaqueros de Bayamon	30	20	10
5	Gigantes de Carolina	30	17	13
6	Atléticos de San Germán	30	16	14
7	Indios de Mayagüez	30	14	16
8	Leones de Ponce	30	13	17
9	Criollos de Caguas	30	8	22
10	Mets de Guaynabo	30	7	23
11	Caciques de Humacao	30	4	26

=== Playoff ===
The playoff format used was a round-robin tournament with two groups of four teams and the best two teams passing into the semifinals.

== Teams ==
Team	City	Colors	Arena	Founded	Coach	Notes
Capitanes de Arecibo	Arecibo	Blue, Yellow	Manuel Iguina Coliseum	1946	David Rosario	Current Champion.
Vaqueros de Bayamón	Bayamón	Blue, White	Rubén Rodríguez Coliseum	1930	Julio Toro	Tie as most championship won by any Franchise in PR with 14.
Mets de Guaynabo	Guaynabo	Blue, Red	Mario Morales Coliseum	1935	Raymond Dalmau	Has 3 Championships
Caciques de Humacao	Humacao	Green, Red	Emilio E. Huyke Coliseum	2005	Leonel Arill	Used to be called Grises de Humacao.
Indios de Mayagüez	Mayagüez	Green, Red	Palacio de Recreación y Deportes	2003	Eddie Casiano	Team plays half of the home games in Cabo Rojo.
Leones de Ponce	Ponce	Red, Black	Juan Pachín Vicéns Auditorium	1950	Vacant	The team has 12 championships.
Atléticos de San Germán	San Germán	Orange, Black	Arquelio Torres Ramírez Coliseum	1932	Nelson Colon	Tie as most championship won by any Franchise in PR with 14.
Cangrejeros de Santurce	Santurce	Orange, Blue	José Miguel Agrelot Coliseum	1955	Rolando Hourruitiner	Team has 8 Championships.
Piratas de Quebradillas	Quebradillas	Red, Black	Raymond Dalmau Coliseum	1932	Manolo Cintron	Team has 4 Championships
Gigantes de Carolina	Carolina	Red, Black	Guillermo Angulo Coliseum		vacant	Team it's under recession
Criollos de Caguas	Caguas, Puerto Rico	Orange, Blue	Tomas Dones Coliseum	1973	vacant	Team it's under recession
