= Eddie Casiano =

Puerto Rican basketball player and coach

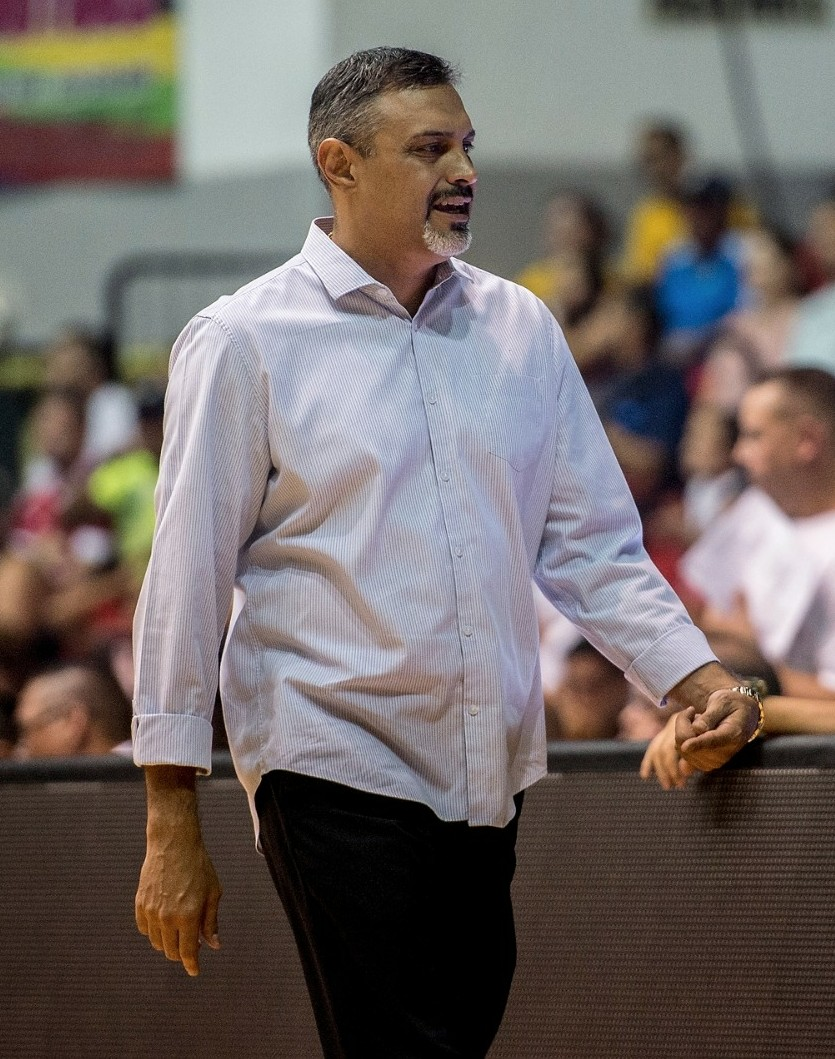
- Casiano in 2017

Atléticos de San Germán
- Title: Head coach
- League: BSN

Personal information
- Born: September 20, 1972 (age 54) Manhattan, New York
- Listed height: 6 ft 3 in (1.91 m)
- Listed weight: 200 lb (91 kg)

Career information
- High school: Lawrence North (Indianapolis, Indiana)
- Playing career: 1988–2008
- Position: Point guard
- Number: 5
- Coaching career: 2009–present

Career history

Playing
- 1988–2000: Atléticos de San Germán
- 2001–2006: Leones de Ponce
- 2007–2008: Indios de Mayagüez

Career highlights
- As player: 5× BSN Champion (1991, 1994, 1997, 2002, 2004); BSN Most Valuable Player (1997); 2× BSN scoring champion (1996, 1997); No. 5 retired by Atléticos de San Germán; As coach: BSN champion (2012); 2× BSN Coach of the Year (2009, 2012); 2× LNBP champion (2012, 2014)
Medals
Men's basketball
Representing Puerto Rico
FIBA AmeriCup
Bronze medal – third place	2003 San Juan
Centrobasket
Gold medal – first place	2003 Culiacán
Silver medal – second place	2004 Santo Domingo
Goodwill Games
Gold medal – first place	1994 Saint Petersburg
Head coach for Puerto Rico
Centrobasket
Gold medal – first place	2016 Panama	Team
Central American and Caribbean Games
Gold medal – first place	2018 Barranquilla

Eddie Casiano Ojeda (born September 20, 1972) is a Puerto Rican former professional basketball player and is currently the head coach for Atléticos de San Germán. He also was the head coach of the Puerto Rican national team.

He was born in Manhattan, New York, but raised in Puerto Rico. Casiano played for the Atléticos de San Germán, Leones de Ponce, and Indios de Mayagüez in the Baloncesto Superior Nacional in a career spanning from 1988 to 2008. Casiano was also a member of the Puerto Rican national basketball team, he played minimally in 1992 against the dream team and was also a part of the 2004 team that defeated the United States at the 2004 Olympic Games in Greece.

Casiano was an integral part of the San Germán team that won three championships during the 1990s. After being traded to Ponce, Casiano won two more championships with them. After retiring from basketball, Casiano became head coach of the Indios de Mayagüez in 2009. In 2012, he led his team to its first championship in history.

From 2016 to 2021, Casiano was the head coach of the Puerto Rico national basketball team.

== Early years and education ==
Eddie Casiano was born in Manhattan, New York City to Puerto Rican parents. At the age of 7, he moved to the island with his mother Carmen Ojeda. After establishing in Bayamón, Casiano started practicing basketball with the support of his mother and grandparents.

Casiano went to Lawrence North High School in Indianapolis and was teammates with North Carolina standout Eric Montross.

Casiano and Nelson Quiñones were teenagers at the time (fifteen and seventeen, respectively) and hadn't finished high school yet, when they were signed by the Atleticos de San German BSN team. During his first years, Casiano was kept mostly on the bench and his contributions were minimal. In 1991, with the departures of Bobby Ríos and Ernesto Malcolm from San Germán, Casiano and Quiñones became starters with 18 and 20 years respectively. Because of their age at the time, the team was nicknamed by the media as Los Nenes de San German (San German's Boys). Their sharpshooting style led the team to three championships during the 1990s (1991, 1994, 1997). During this time, Casiano also participated in his first Olympic Games, joining Atleticos teammate Jose Ortiz as a member of the Puerto Rican National Basketball Team.

After the 2000 season, Casiano was traded to the Leones de Ponce along with Bobby Joe Hatton and Carlos Cortés. As a member of the Leones, Casiano won two more championships (2002 and 2004).

Casiano spent the last two years of his career with the Indios de Mayagüez, retiring in 2008 after 20 years of career.

== Coaching career ==
After retiring from the BSN, Casiano became the head coach of the Indios de Mayagüez. He led the team to their first championship in 2012. Casiano also served as head coach in the Mexican professional basketball league.

In March 2016, Casiano joined the coaching team of the Cangrejeros de Santurce. He served as assistant to then head coach Julio Toro.
