= List of BSN champions =

The List of BSN champions are the champions of the Baloncesto Superior Nacional (BSN) Championship Finals, which is the championship series for the BSN and the conclusion of the professional basketball's league tournament in Puerto Rico. Most Finals have been played in a best-of-seven format. The winning team of the series receives the championship trophy.

The Vaqueros de Bayamon lead the league for most championships won at 18. They are followed by two teams that have 14 titles; the Atléticos de San Germán and Leones de Ponce. These three teams have won a combined 44 of the 91 championships.

== Champions ==
Year	Champion	Result	Sub-Champion	Reference
1930	San Juan "Sport Shop"	3–2	Bayamón Spalding	
1931	San Juan "Matías Eagles"	---	All San Germán	
1932	All San Germán	---	All Vega Baja	
1933	Bayamón Spalding	---	All San Germán	
1934	Fénix de Vega Baja	---	Bayamón Spalding	
1935	Bayamón "Casa Fernández"	3–0	Vega Baja Heinz	
1936	Club Náutico San Juan	---	San Germán "Fcia. Martin"	
1937	Heinz de Vega Baja	2–0	Piratas de Quebradillas	
1938	All San Germán	-–-	San Germán "Fcia. Martin"	
1939	Atléticos de San Germán	-–-	Cardenales de Río Piedras	
1940	Santos de San Juan	3-2	Atléticos de San Germán	
1941	Atléticos de San Germán	---	Cardenales de Río Piedras	
1942	Atléticos de San Germán	-–-	Cangrejeros de Santurce	
1942-1943	Atléticos de San Germán	---	Cangrejeros de Santurce	
1943	Tortuguero	3–1	Santos de San Juan	
1944	Gallitos de la UPR	2–1	Atléticos de San Germán	
1945	Capitalinos de San Juan	2–1	Gallitos de la UPR	
1946	Cardenales de Río Piedras	2–1	Capitanes de Arecibo	
1947	Atléticos de San Germán	-–-	Cardenales de Río Piedras	
1948	Atléticos de San Germán	3–1	Capitanes de Arecibo	
1949	Atléticos de San Germán	3–2	Leones de Ponce	
1950	Atléticos de San Germán	3–1	Santos de San Juan	
1951	Gallitos de la UPR	3–1	Atléticos de San Germán	
1952	Leones de Ponce	3–0	Cangrejeros de Santurce	
1953	Not Finished (Ponce vs. San Germán)			
1954	Leones de Ponce	3–1	Atléticos de San Germán	
1955	Cardenales de Río Piedras	3–1	Atléticos de San Germán	
1956	Cardenales de Río Piedras	3–1	Atléticos de San Germán	
1957	Cardenales de Río Piedras	3–1	Atléticos de San Germán	
1958	Santos de San Juan	4–1	Leones de Ponce	
1959	Capitanes de Arecibo	4–1	Cardenales de Río Piedras	
1960	Leones de Ponce	4–0	Cardenales de Río Piedras	
1961	Leones de Ponce	4–3	Capitanes de Arecibo	
1962	Cangrejeros de Santurce	4–3	Cardenales de Río Piedras	
1963	Cardenales de Río Piedras	4–2	Leones de Ponce	
1964	Leones de Ponce	4–1	Cangrejeros de Santurce	
1965	Leones de Ponce	4–1	Atléticos de San Germán	
1966	Leones de Ponce	4–3	Capitanes de Arecibo	
1967	Vaqueros de Bayamón	4–3	Leones de Ponce	
1968	Cangrejeros de Santurce	4–3	Leones de Ponce	
1969	Vaqueros de Bayamón	4–3	Cardenales de Río Piedras	
1970	Piratas de Quebradillas	4–3	Vaqueros de Bayamón	
1971	Vaqueros de Bayamón	4–2	Cardenales de Río Piedras	
1972	Vaqueros de Bayamón	4–2	Piratas de Quebradillas	
1973	Vaqueros de Bayamón	4–3	Piratas de Quebradillas	
1974	Vaqueros de Bayamón	4–1	Santos de San Juan	
1975	Vaqueros de Bayamón	4–3	Piratas de Quebradillas	
1976	Cardenales de Río Piedras	4–3	Piratas de Quebradillas	
1977	Piratas de Quebradillas	4–3	Cardenales de Río Piedras	
1978	Piratas de Quebradillas	4–1	Mets de Guaynabo	
1979	Piratas de Quebradillas	4–0	Gigantes de Carolina	
1980	Mets de Guaynabo	4–3	Piratas de Quebradillas	
1981	Vaqueros de Bayamón	4–3	Mets de Guaynabo	
1982	Mets de Guaynabo	4–2	Piratas de Quebradillas	
1983	Indios de Canóvanas	4–2	Mets de Guaynabo	
1984	Copa Olimpica / Indios de Canóvanas	4–2	Gallitos de Isabela	
1985	Atléticos de San Germán	4–2	Mets de Guaynabo	
1986	Polluelos de Aibonito	4–3	Atléticos de San Germán	
1987	Titanes de Morovis	4–3	Polluelos de Aibonito	
1988	Vaqueros de Bayamón	4–3	Indios de Canóvanas	
1989	Mets de Guaynabo	4–3	Leones de Ponce	
1990	Leones de Ponce	4–1	Mets de Guaynabo	
1991	Atléticos de San Germán	4–3	Brujos de Guayama	
1992	Leones de Ponce	4–2	Capitanes de Arecibo	
1993	Leones de Ponce	4–1	Mets de Guaynabo	
1994	Atléticos de San Germán	4–0	Brujos de Guayama	
1995	Vaqueros de Bayamón	4–1	Leones de Ponce	
1996	Vaqueros de Bayamón	4–3	Leones de Ponce	
1997	Atléticos de San Germán	4–0	Gigantes de Carolina	
1998	Cangrejeros de Santurce	4–0	Leones de Ponce	
1999	Cangrejeros de Santurce	4–2	Piratas de Quebradillas	
2000	Cangrejeros de Santurce	4–2	Piratas de Quebradillas	
2001	Cangrejeros de Santurce	4–?	Vaqueros de Bayamón	
2002	Leones de Ponce	4–3	Vaqueros de Bayamón	
2003	Cangrejeros de Santurce	4–0	Leones de Ponce	
2004	Leones de Ponce	4–3	Maratonistas de Coamo	
2005	Capitanes de Arecibo	4–0	Vaqueros de Bayamón	
2006	Criollos de Caguas	4–1	Cangrejeros de Santurce	
2007	Cangrejeros de Santurce	4–3	Capitanes de Arecibo	
2008	Capitanes de Arecibo	4–3	Gigantes de Carolina	
2009	Vaqueros de Bayamón	4–2	Piratas de Quebradillas	
2010	Capitanes de Arecibo	4–3	Vaqueros de Bayamón	
2011	Capitanes de Arecibo	4–1	Piratas de Quebradillas	
2012	Indios de Mayagüez	4–1	Capitanes de Arecibo	
2013	Piratas de Quebradillas	4–2	Leones de Ponce	
2014	Leones de Ponce	4–2	Capitanes de Arecibo	
2015	Leones de Ponce	4–2	Capitanes de Arecibo	
2016	Capitanes de Arecibo	4–2	Vaqueros de Bayamón	
2017	Piratas de Quebradillas	4–3	Capitanes de Arecibo	
2018	Capitanes de Arecibo	4–2	Vaqueros de Bayamón	
2019	Santeros de Aguada	4–2	Leones de Ponce	
2020	Vaqueros de Bayamón	3–0	Piratas de Quebradillas	
2021	Capitanes de Arecibo	4–2	Mets de Guaynabo	
2022	Vaqueros de Bayamón	4–2	Atléticos de San Germán	
2023	Gigantes de Carolina	4–1	Vaqueros de Bayamón	
2024	Criollos de Caguas	4–3	Osos de Manatí	
2025	Vaqueros de Bayamón	4–1	Leones de Ponce	
2026	Vaqueros de Bayamón	4–3	Santeros de Aguada	

== Results by teams ==
Teams	Finals appearances	Championships	Runners-up	Years won	Years runners-up
Vaqueros de Bayamón	28	18	10	1933, 1935, 1967, 1969, 1971, 1972, 1973, 1974, 1975, 1981, 1988, 1995, 1996, 2009, 2020, 2022, 2025, 2026	1930, 1934, 1970, 2001, 2002, 2005, 2010, 2016, 2018, 2023
Atléticos de San Germán	26	14	12	1932, 1938, 1939, 1941, 1942, 1942-1943, 1947, 1948, 1949, 1950, 1985, 1991, 1994, 1997	1931, 1933, 1936*, 1938*, 1940, 1954, 1955, 1956, 1957, 1965, 1986, 2022
Leones de Ponce	27	14	12	1952, 1954, 1960, 1961, 1964, 1965, 1966, 1990, 1992, 1993, 2002, 2004, 2014, 2015	1949, 1958, 1963, 1967, 1968, 1989, 1995, 1996, 1998, 2003, 2013, 2019, 2025
Cangrejeros de Santurce	14	8	6	1962, 1968, 1998, 1999, 2000, 2001, 2003, 2007	1942, 1942-1943, 1951, 1952, 1964, 2006
Capitanes de Arecibo	19	8	11	1959, 2005, 2008, 2010, 2011, 2016, 2018, 2021	1932, 1946, 1948, 1961, 1966, 1992, 2007, 2012, 2014, 2015, 2017
Piratas de Quebradillas	18	6	12	1970, 1977, 1978, 1979, 2013, 2017	1937, 1972, 1973, 1975, 1976, 1980, 1982, 1999, 2000, 2009, 2011, 2020
Cardenales de Río Piedras	14	6	8	1946, 1955, 1956, 1957, 1963, 1976	1941, 1947, 1959, 1960, 1962, 1969, 1971, 1977
Capitalinos de San Juan	9	5	4	1930, 1931, 1940, 1945, 1958	1943, 1944, 1950, 1974
Mets de Guaynabo	10	3	7	1980, 1982, 1989	1978, 1981, 1983, 1985, 1990, 1993, 2021
Vega Baja	4	2	2	1934, 1937	1935, 1939
Indios de Canóvanas	3	2	1	1983, 1984	1988
University of Puerto Rico	3	2	1	1944, 1951	1945
Criollos de Caguas	2	2	0	2006, 2024	—
Polluelos de Aibonito	2	1	1	1986	1987
Club Náutico San Juan	1	1	0	1936	—
Indios de Mayagüez	1	1	0	2012	—
Santeros de Aguada	2	1	1	2019	2026
Gigantes de Carolina	4	1	3	2023	1979, 1997, 2008
Titanes de Morovis	1	1	0	1987	
Brujos de Guayama	2	0	2	—	1991, 1994
Gallitos de Isabela	1	0	1	—	1984
Maratonistas de Coamo	1	0	1	—	2004
Osos de Manatí	1	0	1	—	2024

- These titles are from Farmacia Martin team that was unified with the Atléticos de San Germán

== See also ==
- Baloncesto Superior Nacional (BSN)
- BSN Most Valuable Player Award
