= Yamil Chade =

Boxing manager

- Born: c. 1921; Lebanon
- Died: April 25, 2009 (aged 87–88); Puerto Rico
- Occupation(s): Boxing promoter Sports team owner

Yamil Chade (c. 1921 – 25 April 2009) was a Puerto Rican sports team owner and athlete manager.

== Biography ==
Yamil Chade was born in Lebanon. He spent his teenage years in Cuba, but by his 20s he had moved to Puerto Rico, where some of his ancestors came from. By the late 1940s, he became interested in boxing; although he himself had no interest in getting into boxing as a participator, he gained a license to manage boxers while still a relatively young man. One of the first boxers that Chade managed was Kid Gavilán. On 17 May 1951, Gavilán became Chade's first world boxing champion when he defeated Johnny Saxton by a decision in fifteen rounds to win the world Welterweight title. By then, he had become a fixture around boxing circles on the East Coast of the U.S.

Two decades later, Chade met a young Puerto Rican prospect, Wilfredo Gómez, whom he signed when Gómez was still an amateur fighter. Gómez won the professional, WBC world Jr. featherweight title in 1977. Chade's relationship with Gómez soured after Gómez's fight with Lupe Pintor in 1982. Gómez had long suspected Chade of shenanigans such as stealing money from Gómez. Gómez went through a transitional period in 1983, becoming a Featherweight, and he only had two, non-title bouts that year. He won the world Featherweight title in 1984, beating Juan Laporte. Chade signed a contract to try to revive Wilfred Benítez's career during that same year. After Benítez lost to Davey Moore in Monaco, retirement seemed imminent. However, with training from Chade, Benitez returned with three wins, including two over world ranked boxers: Elio Díaz in two rounds at Venezuela, and Kevin Moley, who was ranked among the top ten junior middleweights at the time, in ten rounds at Madison Square Garden. Benítez lost his next two fights and was left stranded in Argentina after his passport was stolen; Chade then concentrated on Carlos De León, four times world Cruiserweight champion.

During his tenure with DeLeon, there were talks about a "super-fight" involving DeLeon and the then undisputed world Heavyweight champion Mike Tyson (the term "super-fight" is used in boxing when two well known boxers are to fight each other; for example, Tyson's fight with Michael Spinks in 1988 was named the "super-fight 1988" by most United States boxing magazines). During 1991, Chade and Félix Trinidad Sr. began a partnership in order to take Félix Trinidad Jr. to professional world championships. Once again, Chade employed the same tactics that he tried to use with Gómez on Trinidad Jr., by taking him to different countries to box so he could become well known around the world. Trinidad Jr. fought in France and Italy early in his career. Before Trinidad knocked out Pedro Torres in Mexico as part of the Julio César Chávez-Greg Haugen undercard, Chade suffered a heart attack, requiring hospitalization. He recuperated and was soon again one of the two men leading Trinidad Jr.'s career.

After Trinidad became the IBF's world Welterweight champion in 1993, Chade continued on trying to make him well known across the world; Trinidad defended his title once in Monterrey, Mexico, in 1994. The relationship between Chade and the Trinidads became so bad that, in 1995, a court dissolved the contract tying Chade and the Trinidads. Perhaps fed up with boxing, Chade turned to basketball, buying the BSN's Arecibo Captains in 2003. The Captains had not won a Puerto Rican national championship tournament since 1959, and when Chade and other team personnel promised the people of Arecibo, Puerto Rico that they would be champions again soon, they were met with skeptics, among Puerto Rican basketball fans and sports writers. After signing Larry Ayuso, Edgar Padilla, Mario Butler, Keenon Jourdan, Dickey Simpkins, and Sharif Fajardo, among others, the Captains became champions for the second time in their team's history, when they defeated the Bayamón Cowboys in four games at the 2005 BSN finals.

== Death ==
Chade died on 25 April 2009 in Puerto Rico, aged 88.

== See also ==
- List of Cubans
- List of Puerto Ricans
