= Christian Dalmau =

Puerto Rican basketball player (born 1975)

Vaqueros de Bayamón
- Title: Head coach
- League: BSN

Personal information
- Born: August 29, 1975 (age 51) Arecibo, Puerto Rico
- Listed height: 6 ft 2 in (1.88 m)
- Listed weight: 200 lb (91 kg)

Career information
- Playing career: 1992–2017
- Position: Shooting guard
- Number: 9, 11

Career history

Playing
- 1992–1994: Piratas de Quebradillas
- 1995: Maratonistas de Coamo
- 1996–1998: Avancinos de Villalba
- 1999–2000: Maratonistas de Coamo
- 2001–2005: San German Athletics
- 2004–2005: Hapoel Galil Elyon
- 2005–2007: Prokom Trefl Sopot
- 2007–2008: Beşiktaş Cola Turka
- 2008: Ural Great Perm
- 2009–2012: Vaqueros de Bayamón
- 2013, 2015: Mets de Guaynabo
- 2014: Cangrejeros de Santurce
- 2013: Halcones Xalapa
- 2015–2016: Gigantes de Carolina
- 2017: Vaqueros de Bayamón

Career highlights
- BSN champion (2009); BSN Finals MVP (2009); 3× BSN Most Valuable Player (2004, 2010, 2011); 6× BSN First Team (2001, 2004, 2009–2012); 3× BSN scoring champion (2004, 2005, 2010); 6× BSN All-Star (2000, 2001, 2004, 2010–2012); BSN All-Star Game MVP (2004); BSN three-point contest winner (2002); Polish Cup winner (2006); Polish Cup MVP (2006); Polish Cup scoring champion (2006); As coach: 2× BSN champion (2025, 2026); BSN Coach of the Year (2026)
Medals
Men's basketball
Representing Puerto Rico
FIBA AmeriCup
Silver medal – second place	2009 Puerto Rico
Centrobasket
Silver medal – second place	2004 Dominican Republic
Bronze medal – third place	2006 Panama
Central American and Caribbean Games
Gold medal – first place	2010 Puerto Rico

Christian Dalmau (born August 29, 1975) is a Puerto Rican retired professional basketball player, and current head coach of the Vaqueros de Bayamón in the Baloncesto Superior Nacional (BSN). He is the second son of the legendary Puerto Rican basketball star Raymond Dalmau. Dalmau has played in the NCAA, the National Basketball Development League, and the Baloncesto Superior Nacional in Puerto Rico. Dalmau has played internationally in Turkey, Poland, and Israel. Dalmau was a member of the Puerto Rican National Basketball Team that defeated the United States in the 2004 Olympic Games.

== Biography ==
After playing college basketball in the NCAA, Dalmau began his professional career in 1993 with the Piratas de Quebradillas in Puerto Rico's top level Baloncesto Superior Nacional (BSN). As a rookie, he showed great potential but the team decided to trade him for more experienced players. His new team was the Maratonistas de Coamo where he would become a star. Dalmau joined the BSN's new Avancinos de Villalba in 1996, playing there from 1996 to 1998. When Villalba folded after its third season, Dalmau returned to Coama for two seasons, then was traded to the Atleticos de San German in 2001.

In the 2002–2003 season, Dalmau signed with the Mobile Revelers of the National Basketball Development League. Dalmau was named Most Valuable Player in 2004. That same year he was selected to replace his brother, Richie, on the Puerto Rican National Basketball Team. He played in the Israeli Basketball League with Hapoel Galil Elyon. From 2005 to 2007, Dalmau played in Poland with Prokom Trefl Sopot.

For the 2007–08 season, Dalmau played with Beşiktaş Cola Turka of the Turkish League. In July 2008 he signed a contract with PBC Ural Great Perm in Russian Basketball Super League 1.

In 2009, Dalmau returned to the BSN to play for the Vaqueros de Bayamón. He led the team to victory at the 2009 BSN Championship, and was chosen as the 2009 BSN Finals MVP. In 2010, after being named the league's MVP during the regular season, Dalmau led Bayamón to their second straight BSN Finals appearance, losing at home in game seven to the Capitanes de Arecibo.

After the 2012 BSN season with Bayamón, now in his late 30s, Dalmau moved to a number of teams, in different leagues, over the next five seasons. In the BSN, he played with the Mets de Guaynabo, Cangrejeros de Santurce and returned to his rookie team, the Piratas de Quebradillas. He also played with Halcones Xalapa in Mexico's Liga Nacional de Baloncesto Profesional.

Dalmau returned to Bayamón in 2017, retiring from playing basketball at the end of that season.

In 2018, Dalmau became head coach of the senior boys basketball team at Central Pointe Christian Academy, a small prep high school in Kissimmee, Florida. In March 2020, the team won the Sunshine Independent Athletic Association championship.

== See also ==
- List of Puerto Ricans

== Sources ==
- Evans, Hilary; Gjerde, Arild; Heijmans, Jeroen; Mallon, Bill; et al. "Christian Dalmau". Olympics at Sports-Reference.com. Sports Reference LLC. Archived from the original on 2020-04-18.
