= BSN Draft =

Basketball event in Puerto Rico

The BSN Draft (also known as BSN Sorteo) is an annual basketball event in Puerto Rico, organized by the Baloncesto Superior Nacional, the country's major basketball league.

== Draft selections ==
PG	Point guard	SG	Shooting guard	SF	Small forward	PF	Power forward	C	Center

^{†} Denotes player who has been selected as BSN Rookie of the Year.
* Denotes player who has been selected as an BSN All-Star.
~ Denotes players who are still active in the BSN.
Denotes player who has never played in the BSN.

=== 2024 BSN Draft ===
Date: March 3, 2024

Rnd.	Pick	Player	Pos.	Nationality (Note: Nationality indicates the player's national team or representative nationality. If a player has not competed at the international level, then the nationality indicates the national team which the player is eligible to represent according to FIBA rules.)	Team	School / prev. team
1	1	Ethan Thompson *	SG	Puerto Rico	Osos de Manati	Mexico City Capitanes (NBA G League)
1	2	Davon Reed	SG	United States	Santeros de Aguada	Memphis Hustle (NBA G League)
1	3	Giovanny Santiago	PG	Puerto Rico	Cangrejeros de Santurce	Kent State (Sr.)
1	4	Kyle Rose	PG	United States	Cangrejeros de Santurce	Fordham (Sr.)
1	5	Tory San Antonio	PG	Puerto Rico	Gigantes de Carolina	Cal State (Sr.)
1	6	Jose Placer Diaz	PG	Puerto Rico	Criollos de Caguas	South Florida (Sr.)
1	7	Matthew Lee	PG	Puerto Rico	Indios de Mayagüez	Missouri State (Sr.)
1	8	Kyle McGee	SG/PG	United States	Atléticos de San Germán	Sacred Heart (Sr.)
1	9	Tyler Hawkins	PG	United States	Leones de Ponce	Barry (Sr.)
1	10	Richard Nunez	PF	Dominican Republic	Criollos de Caguas	Limestone (Sr.)
1	11	Gerardo Texeira	SF	Puerto Rico	Vaqueros de Bayamón	
1	12	Jaylen Colon	SG/PG	Puerto Rico	Leones de Ponce	Felician (Sr.)

=== 2025 BSN Draft ===
Date: January 29, 2025

Rnd.	Pick	Player	Pos.	Nationality	Team	School / club team
1	1	Enrique Freeman	PF	Puerto Rico	Vaqueros de Bayamón	Akron (Sr.)
1	2	Yaxel Lendeborg	SF/PF	Dominican Republic	Piratas de Quebradillas	Michigan (Sr.)
1	3	Nate Santos	SF	United States	Piratas de Quebradillas	Dayton (Sr.)
1	4	Alejandro Vasquez	PG	Puerto Rico	Leones de Ponce	UAB (Sr.)
1	5	Andre Curbelo† (2x*)	PG	Puerto Rico	Piratas de Quebradillas	Southern Miss (Sr.)
1	6	Giancarlo Rosado	SG/PG	United States	Santeros de Aguada	Charlotte (Sr.)
1	7	Anthony Morales	SF	United States	Criollos de Caguas	Kent State (Sr.)
1	8	Mike Bruesewitz	SF	United States	Gigantes de Carolina	
1	9	Neftali Alvarez	SG/PG	Puerto Rico	Indios de Mayagüez	Southern Miss (Sr.)
1	10	Michael O’Connell	SG/PG	United States	Criollos de Caguas	NC State (Sr.)
1	11	Ja'Kair Sanchez	SG/PG	United States	Osos de Manatí	Wagner (Sr.)
1	12	Chris Rubayo	PF	Puerto Rico	Criollos de Caguas	Lafayette (Sr.)

=== 2026 BSN Draft ===
Date: January 29, 2026

Rnd.	Pick	Player	Pos.	Nationality	Team	School / club team
1	1	Chad Baker-Mazara ~	SG/SF	Dominican Republic	Gigantes de Carolina	USC (Sr.)
1	2	Zakai Zeigler	SG/PG	United States	Santeros de Aguada	Tennessee (Sr.)
1	3	Daniel Rivera†	SF	Puerto Rico	Gigantes de Carolina	UAB (Sr.)
1	4	Jevin Muniz ~	SG/SF	Puerto Rico	Capitanes de Arecibo	Colorado State (Sr.)
1	5	Javon Bennet	PG	United States	Mets de Guaynabo	Dayton (Sr.)
1	6	Malachi Smith ~	SG/PG	United States	Capitanes de Arecibo	UConn (Sr.)
1	7	Joshua Rivera ~	SF	Puerto Rico	Gigantes de Carolina	Seton Hall (Sr.)
1	8	Gencarlo Peguero ~	SF/PF	Puerto Rico	Capitanes de Arecibo	Collin College (Sr.)
1	9	Braelee Albert	SF	United States	Atléticos de San Germán	Loyola NO (Sr.)
1	10	Jay Alvarez ~	SG/SF	Puerto Rico	Piratas de Quebradillas	Rider (Sr.)
1	11	Bryan Powell ~	PG	Puerto Rico	Leones de Ponce	Pace (Sr.)
1	12	Miguel Martinez	PG	Puerto Rico	Santeros de Aguada	Fairmont State (Sr.)
2	1	Janpier Lezcano ~	PG	Puerto Rico	Leones de Ponce	
2	2	Skipped			Santeros de Aguada	
2	3	Daniel Ortiz	PG/SG	Puerto Rico	Vaqueros de Bayamón	North Alabama (Sr.)
2	4	Marvin Mantilla ~	PF	Puerto Rico	Capitanes de Arecibo	
2	5	Isaiah Caiter	PG/SG	United States	Vaqueros de Bayamón	
2	6	Skipped			Vaqueros de Bayamón	
2	7	Joshua Denton ~	SF/PF	United States	Criollos de Caguas	Harding (Sr.)
2	8	Anthony Cambo	SG	United States	Piratas de Quebradillas	
2	9	Omar Figueroa ~	PG	Puerto Rico	Leones de Ponce	
2	10	Skipped			Piratas de Quebradillas	
2	11	Luis Moya	PG	Puerto Rico	Leones de Ponce	
2	12	Skipped			Capitanes de Arecibo	

=== 2027 BSN Draft ===
Date: January 2027

Rnd.	Pick	Player	Pos.	Nationality	Team	School / club team
1	1				Cangrejeros de Santurce via Piratas	
1	2				Cangrejeros de Santurce via Indios	
1	3				Cangrejeros de Santurce via Leones	
1	4				Piratas de Quebradillas via Osos	
1	5				Cangrejeros de Santurce via Capitanes	
1	6				Indios de Mayagüez via Gigantes	
1	7				Piratas de Quebradillas via Cangrejeros	
1	8				Santeros de Aguada via Atleticos	
1	9				Cangrejeros de Santurce	
1	10				Santeros de Aguada	
1	11				Santeros de Aguada	
1	12				Indios de Mayagüez	
2	1				Piratas de Quebradillas	
2	2				Gigantes de Carolina	
2	3				Gigantes de Carolina	
2	4				Piratas de Quebradillas	
2	5				Osos de Manati	
2	6				Indios de Mayagüez	
2	7				Capitanes de Arecibo	
2	8				Indios de Mayagüez	
2	9				Criollos de Caguas	
2	10				Santeros de Aguada	
2	11				Santeros de Aguada	
2	12				Piratas de Quebradillas	

== See also ==
- Baloncesto Superior Nacional
- BSN All-Star Game
