= Edwin "Puruco" Nolasco Coliseum =

Indoor sporting arena located in Coamo, Puerto Rico

Coordinates: 18°4′8″N 66°21′52″W

Edwin "Puruco" Nolasco Coliseum Coliseo Edwin "Puruco" Nolasco
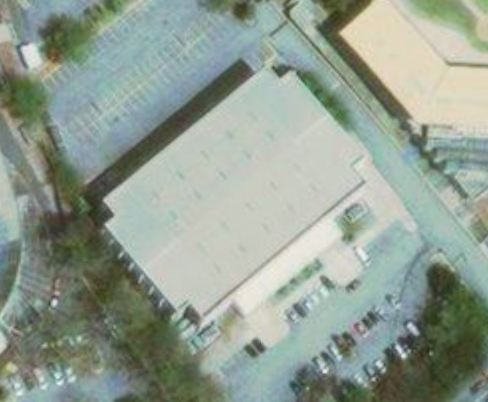
- Interactive map of Edwin "Puruco" Nolasco Coliseum; Coliseo Edwin "Puruco" Nolasco
- Location: Coamo, Puerto Rico
- Owner: Municipality of Coamo
- Operator: Municipality of Coamo
- Capacity: 5,000 (approx. maximum)

Tenants
- Maratonistas de Coamo, BSN

Edwin "Puruco" Nolasco Coliseum (Spanish: Coliseo Edwin "Puruco" Nolasco) is an indoor sporting arena located in Coamo, Puerto Rico. The coliseum opened in 1985 and was renovated in 1999.

The coliseum's seating capacity is 5,000 seats. It is used mostly for basketball as the home arena of the Maratonistas de Coamo.
