= Neira Ortiz =

Puerto Rican professional volleyball player (born 1993)

Neira Ortiz Ruiz (born 6 July, 1993 in San Juan) is a Puerto Rican professional volleyball player. She has represented Puerto Rico as a member of the Puerto Rico women's national volleyball team. With a height of 6 feet and 5 inches, Ortiz is an outside hitter from the right-side position in her sport.

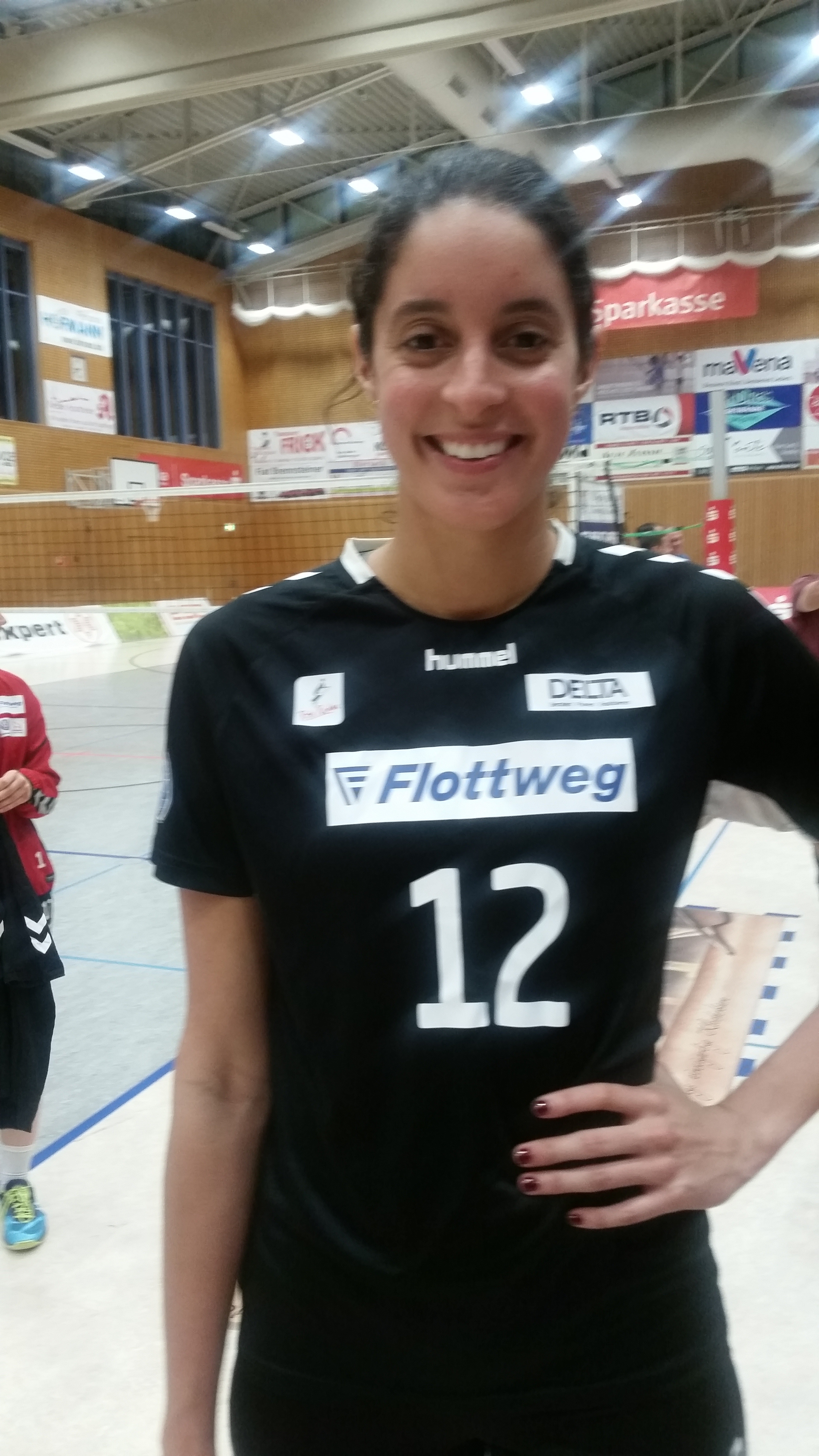
Neira Ortiz in 2019

== Early life ==
Ortiz was born in the Puerto Rican capital of San Juan, the daughter of former NBA player Jose "Piculin" Ortiz and of model, Miss Puerto Rico 1981 and Miss World contestant Andrenira "Nirita" Ruiz. Through her mom, she is the granddaughter of legendary Puerto Rican actor, Jaime Ruiz Escobar.

Ortiz, who also played basketball and softball as a youngster, went to play at the University of Colorado Boulder as an 18-year old in 2011.

== Professional volleyball career ==
Since the age of 22, Ortiz has played in the LVSF in Puerto Rico.

In 2015, she was signed by the Capitanas de San Juan volleyball team, playing there until 2017. She played in Peru during 2017, with the Alianza Lima women's volleyball team, returning to Puerto Rico to play with the Polluelas de Aibonito team during their 2018-19 season. She then played in the German women's pro league with Rote Raben Vilsbiburg and with Llaneras de Toa Baja in Puerto Rico during the 2019-20 season, in the Hungarian team Fatum Nyiregyhaza team and Puerto Rico's Sanjuaneras de la Capital teams in 2020-21, with CSM Târgoviște of the CEV Cup of Romania and the Criollas de Caguas during 2021-22, with Il Capital Legionovia Legionowo of Poland in 2022-23 and the Cangrejeras de Santurce in Puerto Rico since 2022. As of 2025, she was still with Santurce.

During 2023, she injured her ankle.

In 2024, Ortiz won a national championship with Santurce.

== Puerto Rico women's national volleyball team ==
Ortiz has played for the Puerto Rico women's national volleyball team at various international competitions.

One of the competitions where she played was the 2022 FIVB Women's Volleyball World Championship, which was hosted by Netherlands and Poland.

== Personal ==
She has had a fractured relationship with her father; the two have gotten closer after a few years.

She also enjoys singing and dancing.

== See also ==
- List of Puerto Ricans
