= Rubén Rodríguez (basketball) =

Puerto Rican basketball player (born 1953)

Personal information
- Born: August 5, 1953 (age 73) New York City, New York
- Listed height: 6 ft 7 in (2.01 m)
- Listed weight: 210 lb (95 kg)

Career information
- College: LIU Brooklyn (1972–1975)
- NBA draft: 1975: undrafted
- Playing career: 1969–1991
- Position: Power forward / center

Career history
- 1969–1991: Vaqueros de Bayamón

Career statistics
- Points: 11,549 (18.3 ppg)
- Rebounds: 6,178 (9.8 rpg)
- Assists: 1,078 (1.7 apg)
Medals
Men's basketball
Representing Puerto Rico
Pan American Games
Silver medal – second place	1979 San Juan	Team

Rubén Rodríguez Leon (born August 5, 1953) is a Puerto Rican former basketball player. Born in New York City and also a former resident of Los Angeles, California, he played 23 seasons in the Baloncesto Superior Nacional (BSN) tournament.

Many people consider either him to be, along with José Ortíz, Raymond Dalmau, Juan Vicens, Rafael Valle, Georgie Torres or Mario Morales, the greatest or one of the greatest basketball players in Puerto Rico's national tournament's history. He was one of only five players (Morales, Dalmau, Georgie Torres and Mario Butler being the other four) to reach 10,000 or more points during his BSN career, and for a long time, was the second best scorer ever behind Dalmau.

Rodríguez spent his whole career with the Vaqueros de Bayamon of Bayamón. With the Vaqueros, he won 8 national championships, in 1969, five in a row from 1971 to 1975, one in 1981 and one in 1988, the year that the team inaugurated his actual venue, that carries his name, the Rubén Rodríguez Coliseum. He also garnered the MVP award in 1979, and, once the three-point shot was established for the first time in the Puerto Rican tournament during the 1980 season, he started making shots from behind the three-point line too.

Rodríguez was a member of the Puerto Rican national basketball team, playing in many international tournaments such as the Olympic Games and Pan American Games. Rodríguez for Team Puerto Rico played against Michael Jordan for Team USA, in Bayamon, in 1983.

He retired from basketball in 1991. He tried several times to coach a basketball team in the Puerto Rico League, BSN, but without success. His most recent attempt was with the Bayamón team in 2002. He started the season 0-5 and was eventually fired. He is now a basketball analyst for several radio shows in Puerto Rico.
