= Bobby Ríos =

Puerto Rican basketball player

Personal information
- Born: August 14, 1957 (age 69) Santurce, Puerto Rico
- Listed height: 6 ft 0 in (1.83 m)
- Listed weight: 180 lb (82 kg)

Career information
- Playing career: 1978–2001
- Position: Guard

Career history
- 1978–1980: Vaqueros de Bayamón
- 1981–1985: Leones de Ponce
- 1985–1990: Atléticos de San Germán
- 1991–1998: Leones de Ponce
- 1999–2000: Brujos de Guayama
- 2001: Maratonistas de Coamo

Career highlights
- 3x BSN champion (1985, 1992, 1993); BSN Most Valuable Player (1995); Olympic Games, Seoul (1988)

Roberto "Bobby" Ríos Osorio (born August 14, 1957) is a retired Puerto Rican basketball player. Ríos played as a point guard and shooting guard for five different teams during his career, and won three championships. He is currently 5th in assists and 7th in scoring of all-time in the league.

== Career ==
Ríos was born in Santurce, Puerto Rico on August 14, 1957. He debuted with the Vaqueros de Bayamón in 1978.

In 1981, Ríos was traded to the Leones de Ponce where he became the starting point guard. He ended up averaging 17.7 points per game in his first season and remained a consistent scorer during this first stint with the team. However, in the middle of the 1985 season, Ríos was traded to the Atléticos de San Germán. He averaged 15 points per game during 23 games with San Germán, and won his first championship. During the next five seasons with the team, Ríos averaged over 20 points per game in every season.

He competed in the men's tournament at the 1988 Summer Olympics.

In 1991, Ríos returned to Ponce and remained with them for 8 seasons. During those seasons, he continued to be a prolific scorer, winning 2 more championships and the Most Valuable Player award in 1995. Ríos was the first player in the history of the BSN to reach the platform of 1,000 3 point baskets made and was arguably one of the best 3 point shooters of all-times in the league. In 1999 Ríos went to the Brujos de Guayama and played with them for two seasons. He retired in 2001 as a member of the Maratonistas de Coamo.

== Personal life ==
Roberto "Bobby" Ríos at an early age had excelled in a variety of sports before playing basketball including track and field where he was a prospect at Central High School in Santurce, Puerto Rico. He started his semi-pro basketball career in 1977 with the San Juan Moderno team that at the time was head coached by the legendary Julio Toro. That led him to be invited by the Vaqueros de Bayamón's then star Rubén Montañez to the team practices and eventually Ríos was signed by then Bayamón owner Hetin Reyes in 1978.

Ríos moved to Ponce, Puerto Rico in 1981, after he was traded to the Leonés De Ponce. He also has three daughters that are his # 1 fans. Ríos worked for the city of Ponce for 20 years and is currently retired and enjoying his life. He also lives very grateful to the sport of basketball.

== Statistics ==
Legend
GP	Games played	GS	Games started	MPG	Minutes per game
FG%	Field goal percentage	3P%	3-point field goal percentage	FT%	Free throw percentage
RPG	Rebounds per game	APG	Assists per game	SPG	Steals per game
BPG	Blocks per game	PPG	Points per game	**Bold**	Career high

†	Denotes seasons in which Ríos won a BSN championship

Year	Team	GP	FG%	3P%	FT%	RPG	APG	PPG
1978	Bayamón	32	**.527**	.000	.776	1.5	0.8	9.3
1979	Bayamón	30	.512	.000	.800	2.1	1.9	8.6
1980	Ponce	28	.446	.000	.822	3.0	2.3	8.6
1981	Ponce	33	.504	.222	.796	3.2	5.3	17.8
1982	Ponce	32	.469	.167	.694	3.2	3.3	16.8
1983	Ponce	33	.470	.381	.810	2.8	3.5	13.5
1984	Ponce	24	.454	.418	.852	**3.6**	3.3	15.5
1985	Ponce	9	.467	**.538**	.839	2.6	1.8	13.0
1985	San Germán	23	.500	.382	.825	3.0	3.6	15.1
1986	San Germán	33	.475	.448	.819	2.4	5.8	22.3
1987	San Germán	30	.509	.412	.898	2.1	5.1	**24.7**
1988	San Germán	31	.459	.364	.808	2.8	**6.4**	20.1
1989	San Germán	30	.488	.435	.894	3.2	6.2	21.7
1990	San Germán	30	.460	.374	.855	3.5	4.4	21.2
1991	Ponce	22	.523	.469	.781	2.5	3.0	16.5
1992	Ponce	33	.485	.422	.871	3.6	7.1	19.0
1993	Ponce	**34**	.457	.396	.891	2.8	5.3	17.1
1994	Ponce	30	.490	.413	.864	2.0	2.2	20.4
1995	Ponce	32	.443	.376	.864	2.9	4.3	20.8
1996	Ponce	**34**	.442	.401	.752	2.6	2.5	20.3
1997	Ponce	28	.465	.485	.883	1.2	2.2	15.3
1998	Ponce	30	.455	.414	.814	1.4	2.6	16.1
1999	Guayama	21	.467	.424	.886	1.1	1.0	11.3
2000	Guayama	19	.217	.136	**.929**	0.8	0.4	1.9
Career		681	.466	.337	.834	2.5	3.3	16.1
