= Indios de Canóvanas =

- Leagues: Liga de Baloncesto Puertorriqueña
- Founded: 2023
- Arena: Carlos Miguel Mangual Court
- Capacity: 2,200
- Location: Canóvanas, Puerto Rico
- Team colors: Purple, gold
- Head coach: H. Sammy Martinéz
- Championships: 2 (1983, 1984)
Home	Away	Third

The Indios de Canóvanas (lit. "Canóvanas Indians") are a professional basketball team based in Canóvanas, Puerto Rico. They currently play in the Liga de Baloncesto Puertorriqueña (LBP), the second division of Puerto Rico's basketball pyramid. Before going defunct briefly, the team previously competed in the Baloncesto Superior Nacional (BSN), the top flight.

== History ==
The Indios were active for several years in the league, winning the championship in 1983 and 1984. They also reached the finals in 1988, but lost to the Vaqueros de Bayamón. Despite their success in the 1980s, the team disappeared in the 1990s. There have been movements to reestablish the team, but they have been unsuccessful.

Guard Angelo Cruz and center Ramón Ramos were two of the team key players during the 1980s.
