= Rolando Frazer =

Panamanian basketball player (born 1958)

Personal information
- Born: July 3, 1958 (age 68) Panama City, Panama
- Listed height: 6 ft 7 in (2.01 m)
- Listed weight: 220 lb (100 kg)

Career information
- High school: Escuela Profesional Isabel Herrera de Obalda
- College: Briar Cliff (1977–1981)
- NBA draft: 1981: 4th round, 83rd overall pick
- Drafted by: Indiana Pacers
- Playing career: 1980–2001
- Position: Center / power forward
- Number: 10, 11, 13

Career history
- 1980–1982: Polluelos de Aibonito
- 1982–1984: Obras Sanitarias
- 1984–1985: Polluelos de Aibonito
- 1985–1987: TDK Manresa
- 1987–1988: Polluelos de Aibonito
- 1988–1989: TDK Manresa
- 1989–1995: Polluelos de Aibonito
- 1996–1997: Capitanes de Arecibo
- 1997–2001: Avancinos de Villalba / Maratonistas de Coamo

Career highlights
- FIBA Intercontinental Cup champion (1983); BSN champion (1986); 2× BSN Most Valuable Player (1981, 1987); 2× BSN scoring champion (1981, 1982); 3× NAIA All-American (1979–1981); NAIA scoring champion (1980)

Career BSN statistics
- Points: 12,096 (20.1 ppg)
- Rebounds: 6,153 (10.2 rpg)
- Assists: 943 (1.6 apg)
- Stats at Basketball Reference
Medals
Representing Panama
Men's basketball
CentroBasket
Gold medal – first place	1981 San Juan

Rolando Frazer Thorne (born July 3, 1958, in Panama City, Panama) is a Panamanian former professional basketball player. At a height of 6 ft 7 in (2.01 m) tall, he played at the power forward and center positions. He was an inaugural inductee of the Briar Cliff Athletic Hall of Fame, in 1991.

== College career ==
Frazer, originally a native of Panama City, Panama, was recruited by head coach Ray Nacke to play college basketball at Briar Cliff College, in Sioux City, Iowa. He was cited as an NAIA Honorable Mention All-American as a freshman, when he averaged 15.6 points per game, as a sixth man. He led the nation (all divisions) in scoring his junior year, when he averaged 36.4 points per game. He averaged 30.1 points per game as a senior, when the Chargers finished with a 27–3 record, and were the number one rated team in the final NAIA top twenty poll.

Overall, in 118 games played, Frazer averaged 26.2 points, 9.4 rebounds per game, and 1.7 assists per game, and shot 60.5 percent from the floor, during his college career. He owns 14 of Briar Cliff's top twenty-five individual scoring performances, including his career best 56-point outburst against Northwestern, on February 13, 1980. Frazer also continues to hold the Chargers' career rebounding record, with 1,110 total rebounds. In 1981, Frazer shared the George Clarkson Award with Drake's Lewis Lloyd. The Clarkson Award is presented annually to Iowa's best collegiate basketball player.

At Briar Cliff, he was a three-time NAIA First Team All-American, and he concluded his college career as the state of Iowa's all-time scoring leader, with 3,078 total points scored (he is currently 2nd all-time). He was the first player in the history of Iowan college basketball, to score at least 3,000 total career points, and he is the only Briar Cliff athlete to have been recognized as a three-time First Team NAIA All-American. During Frazer's illustrious college career, Briar Cliff posted an overall record of 101–17. Frazer was cited in numerous national publications throughout his career. The February 2, 1981, issue of Sports Illustrated, featured Frazer in a college basketball article entitled, "Pride of the Panama Pipeline."

== Professional career ==
Frazer was selected in the 4th round (number 83 overall), in the 1981 NBA draft, by the Indiana Pacers. However, he never played in the NBA. Frazer won the 1983 FIBA Intercontinental Cup championship, while he was a member of the Argentine Club Championship team Obras Sanitarias.

Frazer played most of his career in the Puerto Rican League, where he won the Puerto Rican League championship in 1986, and was a two-time MVP of the league (1981, 1987). He also spent three years in the Spanish League, with TDK Manresa, where he averaged 25.3 points and 8.7 rebounds per game, in 95 games played.

== National team career ==
Frazer first gained a spot on the Panama men's national basketball team as a 15-year-old, in his second season of playing organized basketball. In 1979, Frazer was named the team captain of an NAIA all-star squad that toured Argentina and Brazil. Frazer took game high scoring honors (19 points) in Panama's 93–88 loss against Bobby Knight's Team USA, at the 1979 Pan American Games. Scoring 26 points and grabbing 13 rebounds, he helped the National team win the gold medal at the 1981 CentroBasket.

Frazer led Panama to an all-time best ninth-place finish at the 1982 FIBA World Championship. He was the tournament's top scorer, with a scoring average of 24.4 points per game. He also played at the 1986 FIBA World Championship, where he averaged 19.8 points per game.

Along with Mario Butler, he led Panama to become a competitive national team in the 1980s. In 1987, Frazer returned to the United States, to represent Panama at the 1987 Pan American Games, at Indianapolis.

== Post-playing career ==
After he retired from playing professional basketball, Frazer became a basketball referee.
