= Jerome Mincy =

Puerto Rican basketball player

Personal information
- Born: November 10, 1964 (age 62) Aguadilla, Puerto Rico
- Listed height: 6 ft 6 in (1.98 m)
- Listed weight: 225 lb (102 kg)

Career information
- High school: Hamilton (Memphis, Tennessee)
- College: UAB (1982–1986)
- NBA draft: 1986: 5th round, 94th overall pick
- Drafted by: New York Knicks
- Playing career: 1986–2002
- Position: Forward

Career highlights
- 3× BSN champion (1988, 1995, 1996); No. 17 retired by Vaqueros de Bayamón; First-team All-Sun Belt (1986); No. 40 retired by UAB Blazers
- Stats at Basketball Reference
Medals
Men's basketball
Representing Puerto Rico
Pan American Games
Gold medal – first place	Havana 1991	Team competition
Bronze medal – third place	Indianapolis 1987	Team competition
Tournament of the Americas
Gold medal – first place	Mexico City 1989	Team competition
Gold medal – first place	Neuquen 1995	Team competition
Silver medal – second place	Montevideo 1988	Team competition
Silver medal – second place	Montevideo 1997	Team competition
Goodwill Games
Gold medal – first place	St Petersburg 1994	Team competition

Jerome Alfred Mincy Clark (born November 10, 1964) is a Puerto Rican former professional basketball player who was born to Shelly and Willie Mincy at Ramey Air Force Base in Aguadilla, Puerto Rico on November 10, 1964. He played in the NCAA with the UAB Blazers and the Baloncesto Superior Nacional (BSN) with Vaqueros de Bayamón. He was a member of the Puerto Rican national team from 1983 to 2002.

== Biography ==
Jerome joined the BSN's Vaqueros De Bayamón when he turned 18, in 1982, while attending College at UAB. Following his senior season he failed to make the roster of the NBA's New York Knicks. He was selected in the fifth round of the 1986 NBA draft by the Knicks, but never made the roster. He completed a solid career playing abroad in France, Spain and Argentina with the Boca Juniors. He also played during the summers in Puerto Rico where he took the Vaqueros to three championships ('88, '95 & '96) and many final appearances. In 2012–2013, he was named an assistant coach for the Mets De Guaynabo in the Puerto Rican league.

He also played for Puerto Rico's national basketball team from 1983 to 2002. He retired from the BSN after the 2002 Finals and from the Puerto Rican National team after the 2002 World Championships in Indianapolis. He participated in 3 Olympic Games competitions representing Puerto Rico. He announced he will stay on the national team, but on an executive position as General Manager he is also the current top assistant with the Vaqueros de Bayamon.

The Vaqueros team retired his jersey, number 17, in 2002. However, Mincy was traded to the Leones de Ponce before the season began.

Later after retiring, he became a basketball coach and PE teacher at Bridge Prep Academy of Osceola Florida.

== Career stats ==
Mincy's NCAA stats are 1473 points with a 10.8 PPG, 933 rebounds, .477 field goal percentage, .638 free-throw percentage.

== National team career ==
Jerome Mincy played at 5 FIBA World Cups: (1986, 1990, 1994, 1998, and 2002). He totaled 36 games played and 383 points scored during those competitions.

== See also ==
- List of Puerto Ricans
