= Georgie Torres =

Puerto Rican basketball player

Personal information
- Born: November 21, 1957 (age 68) Camuy, Puerto Rico
- Listed height: 6 ft 4 in (1.93 m)
- Listed weight: 200 lb (91 kg)

Career information
- College: Southern Nazarene (1980–1981)
- NBA draft: 1981: 4th round, 73rd overall pick
- Drafted by: Utah Jazz
- Playing career: 1975–2001
- Position: Shooting guard / small forward

Career history
- 1975–1989: Cariduros de Fajardo
- 1981–1982: Billings Volcanos
- 1981–1982: Rochester Zeniths
- 1990–1992: Mets de Guaynabo
- 1993–1997: Vaqueros de Bayamon
- 1998–1999: Gallitos de Isabela
- 1999–2000: Cangrejeros de Santurce
- 2000–2001: Gigantes de Carolina

Career highlights
- 3× BSN champion (1995, 1996, 1999); 3× BSN Most Valuable Player (1984–1986); 7× BSN Scoring Champion (1977–1979, 1984–1987); BSN All-Time Leading Scorer; NAIA tournament MVP (1981)

Career statistics
- Points: 15,863 (23.4 ppg)
- Rebounds: 3,381 (5.0 rpg)
- Assists: 2,203 (3.2 apg)
- Stats at Basketball Reference
Medals
Men's basketball
Representing Puerto Rico
Pan American Games
Silver medal – second place	1979 San Juan	Team

Georgie Torres Dougherty (born September 21, 1957) is a Puerto Rican former professional basketball player. He is a well-known former BSN basketball player. Torres broke the record for the most points scored in a career in that league, with over 15,800 points scored. He was the first player to reach that number of points. The Puerto Rican professional basketball league only holds 30 to 34 games each year; players who score over 5,000 career points there are usually considered to be among the great Puerto Rican basketball players.

Torres debuted in the BSN in 1975, with the "Cariduros de Fajardo". Torres became a household name in Puerto Rico while with that team. He led the league in points scored from 1984 to 1987. Despite helping the Cariduros to the playoffs multiple times during his era there, the Cariduros failed to win a championship.

Later on, Torres went on to play with the "Mets de Guaynabo" alongside Mario Morales. After his stay with the Mets, Torres played for the Vaqueros de Bayamon with whom he won his first two championships in 1995 and 1996 and the "Gallitos de Isabela", before landing with the "Cangrejeros de Santurce". With the Crabbers, Torres teamed up along with players such as José Ortiz, Carlos Arroyo, Rolando Hourruitiner and Sharif Fajardo to win the league's championship in 1999.

Also in 1999, he reached the milestone of 15,500 points.

Torres was a longtime member of the Puerto Rican national basketball team. Due to different reasons, however, the 1996 Summer Olympics in Atlanta, Georgia were the only Olympic Games he was able to attend.

== See also ==
- List of Puerto Ricans
