= Capitalinos de San Juan =

Puerto Rican basketball team

- Leagues: BSN
- Founded: 1930
- Dissolved: 1998
- Location: San Juan, Puerto Rico
- Championships: 5 (1930, 1931, 1940, 1945, 1958)
Home	Away	Third

The Capitalinos de San Juan was a Puerto Rican basketball team based in San Juan, Puerto Rico. They played in the Baloncesto Superior Nacional (BSN). The Capitalinos are the first Puerto Rican basketball champions, the team was very successful having won five championships from the 1930s through the 1950s.

For a long period beginning in the late 1970s until the early 1990s, the franchise did not operate. The Capitalinos returned during the 1990s, posting poor win–loss records.

In 1998, producer and entrepreneur Angelo Medina acquired the Capitalinos and the Tiburones de Aguadilla, merging them into a new version of the Cangrejeros de Santurce.
