= Angelo Cruz =

Puerto Rican professional basketball player

Personal information
- Born: September 20, 1958 New York City, New York, U.S.
- Died: 1998 (disappeared) Puerto Rico
- Listed height: 5 ft 9 in (1.75 m)
- Listed weight: 175 lb (79 kg)

Career information
- High school: All Hallows and DeWitt Clinton (The Bronx, New York)
- College: Bethany Nazarene College; Essex County College
- Position: Point guard

Career history
- 1977–1990: Indios de Canóvanas
- 1991–1993: Titanes de Morovis
Medals
Men's basketball
Representing Puerto Rico
Pan American Games
Silver medal – second place	San Juan 1979	{{{2}}}
Bronze medal – third place	Indianapolis 1987	{{{2}}}
Tournament of the Americas
Silver medal – second place	Montevideo 1988	{{{2}}}

Angelo "Monchito" Cruz (born September 20, 1958) is a Puerto Rican former professional basketball player. He was born in New York. Coming out of the Patterson Projects in Mott Haven, Bronx, "Monchito" was a New York City Playground legend by the time he finished High School at DeWitt Clinton High School; he first played 2 or 3 years at All Hallows High School, both in the Bronx. After playing at Bethany Nazarene College (Oklahoma) and Essex (New Jersey) County College, he moved on to play professionally in Puerto Rico.

== Career ==
=== Career in Puerto Rico ===
Cruz began his career in the Baloncesto Superior Nacional in 1977, when he was 18 years old. He played for the Indios de Canóvanas for 13 seasons. He led Canóvanas to back-to-back championships in 1983 and 1984 and recorded his 1,500th assist in 1988. His team battles with perennial powerhouses Bayamón, Guaynabo and San Germán are still famous in BSN lore. Cruz spent his last three seasons with the Titanes de Morovis. After 16 years in the league averaging 14.8 points and 4.8 assists per game, he retired after the 1993 season.

His best remembered basket was one he made in the 1983 Semi-Finals against the Vaqueros de Bayamon. Down by three points, Cruz launched a half-court shot as time expired which went in to tie the game. The Indios eventually won in overtime, later winning the series and then, further later on, that season's championship. (they repeated as champions in 1984).

=== International career ===
At the age of 20, Cruz was part of Puerto Rico's 1979 Pan American team that earned a silver medal in San Juan in a memorable PR-USA showdown against the Isiah Thomas/Bobby Knight led USA team. He would go on to play in two more Pan Am Games in 1983 in Caracas, Venezuela and in 1987 at Indianapolis, Indiana. In 1984 he played at the FIBA 1984 Tournament of the Americas Olympic Qualifier in São Paulo, Brazil. In 1990, he played at the 1990 Goodwill Games in Seattle, Washington.

=== Career in The Olympics ===
In 1988, Cruz helped qualify Puerto Rico to the 1988 Summer Olympics in Seoul, Korea, at the 1988 Tournament of the Americas Olympic Qualifier in Montevideo, Uruguay. At that time, Puerto Rico had been absent from the Summer Olympics since 1976. At the 1988 Summer Olympics in Korea he led the Puerto Rican National Basketball Team in assists and was second in scoring with a 12.375 scoring average. Against Yugoslavia, he scored the winning shot at the buzzer to beat the eventual silver medalist, which was led by soon-to-be NBA players Dražen Petrović and Vlade Divac 74–72.

=== FIBA World Tournaments ===
Cruz played in two FIBA World Tournaments, 1986 in Spain and 1990 in Argentina. In 1990, in Buenos Aires, he helped Puerto Rico earn a Fourth Place at the 1990 FIBA World Championship. On its way to a 7–0 record his team defeated World Powers Yugoslavia, Team USA, and Australia, only to lose its last two games in the medal round to the Soviet Union and Team USA. That was his final participation in International Competition.

== Disappearance ==
Angelo Cruz retired from basketball in 1993, after which he found a job working at Yankee Stadium, where he met and befriended fellow Puerto Rican Milwaukee Brewers player José Valentín when he was in town playing against the Yankees. However, in 1998, he mysteriously disappeared while visiting family in Puerto Rico. He has not been seen or heard from since.

In August 2011, the first basketball tournament honoring Cruz's life was held in Patterson Houses. In the days leading up to the tournament, the Cruz family released several statements informing the public they were still seeking answers to his disappearance. The family also announced a scholarship fund created in his memory. All contributions support basketball camps for Bronx youths. The tournaments are attended by Cruz's eldest child, Angel Cruz, Jr., his grandson, Kaneda Cruz, Cruz's mother Gloria and his sister Naomi Cruz-Lymon along with his basketball family and many friends.

== Personal life ==
While still living in Mott Haven, Bronx, Cruz had his first child with Denise West whom they named Angel Monchito Cruz, Jr. His son, Angel continues to reside in Mott Haven and is employed as a businessman. Angel had a grandson, Kaneda Cruz whom is from the same area as Angelo (South Bronx). Kaneda is Cruz's only grandchild. His other children include his second son, Alvin, who played with various teams of the BSN and many international ones, and daughter, Anaíss. He also had another daughter, Angeliz, from his marriage to Annie Torres. His youngest child, Justin Cruz was born from his marriage with Carmen Diaz Farrell.

At the time of his disappearance, Cruz was no longer married.

== See also ==
- List of people who disappeared mysteriously: 1910–1990
- List of Puerto Ricans
- Travis Trice - - who once made a shot similar to Cruz's 1983 buzzer-beater in the BSN playoffs
