= Maratonistas de Coamo =

Defunct Puerto Rican professional basketball team

- Leagues: BSN
- Founded: 1940
- Folded: 2015
- History: Cardenales de Río Piedras; 1940–1985; Maratonistas de Coamo; 1985–1996; Avancinos de Villalba; 1996–1999; Maratonistas de Coamo; 1999–2015
- Arena: Edwin "Puruco" Nolasco Coliseum
- Capacity: 5,000
- Team colors: Red, Yellow, Black

The Maratonistas de Coamo (English: Coamo Marathon Runners) was a Puerto Rican professional basketball team based in Coamo, that competed in the National Superior Basketball (BSN) league from 1985 until 2015 when the team was sold and was relocated to Aguada as the Santeros. It is now a member of the Liga de Baloncesto Puertorriqueña, and recently won the LBP championship. Their home court was the Edwin "Puruco" Nolasco Coliseum.

The team was established as the Cardenales de Rio Piedras (Rio Piedras Cardinals) in 1940. They relocated in 1985 to the town of Coamo in central Puerto Rico. As the Cardinals, the franchise advanced to the BSN Finals 15 times, and won six BSN Championships. In Coamo, the Maratonistas advanced to their first and only finals berth in 2004, appearing there for the sixteenth time in franchise history and first since 1977, when the club was based in Río Piedras. The team ended up losing to the Ponce Lions in seven games.

== Franchise history ==
=== 1940s-1985: Cardenales de Río Piedras ===
The Maratonistas' previous incarnation, the Cardenales de Río Piedras, were formed in the 1940s. Early in their history they appeared in several Finals, winning their first championship in 1946 against the Capitanes de Arecibo. From 1955 to 1957, the team won three championships in a row. The team kept enjoying success during the following years, reaching the Finals in three more occasions (1959, 1960, 1962).

The team won a championship in 1963 led by players like Juan Báez and others. After that, the team reached the Finals four more times. During the 1970s, the team played their home games at Rubén Zayas Montañez Court.

The Cardenales would win another historic championship in 1976 beating the favorite Piratas de Quebradillas. The team, owned by attorney and engineer Rene Aponte Caratini, was one of the best in the league's history. Their roster included center Earl Brown, and guards Butch Lee and the legendary Freddie "Meteor" Lugo. They would return to the finals in 1977 and lose to the Piratas in a thriller.

In 1985, the Cardenales de Río Piedras were relocated to Coamo under the name of the Maratonistas de Coamo.

=== 1985-1998: First decade and relocations ===
After their relocation to Coamo, the Maratonistas enjoyed some success with the arrival of players like Dean Borges, Darryl Cambrelén, William "Memo" Reveron, Gerald Lebron Arrufat, Pablito Alicea, and Joao "Pipoca" Vianna, among others.

However, in 1996, the team was relocated again to Villalba, under the name of Avancinos de Villalba. The team remained in Villalba for three years.

=== 1999-2008: Return to Coamo and resurgence ===
In 1999, the team returned to Coamo under the ownership of Fernando Ortíz. The team included young players like Carlos Escalera, Miguel Ali Berdiel, Christian Dalmau, and NCAA prospect Filiberto Rivera.

In 2004, the Maratonistas had their best season to date. Two of their players, Gabriel Mouneke and Carlos Escalera, were selected Most Valuable Player and Most Improved Player respectively. Coamo reached the BSN Finals against the Leones de Ponce, but lost on a seventh game to Ponce.

In 2008, the team was forced to recess due to financial problems.

=== 2011-2015 ===
In 2011, the team returned to the league led by 2007 Rookie of the Year Johwen Villegas.

In 2013, it was announced the team would return to league competition in 2014 after a two-year absence.

In 2015, the team was sold and relocated as the Santeros de Aguada.

== Notable players ==
- Justin Keenan
- Kevin Sheppard
- Marcus Landry
- Edwin Ubiles
- Rolando Frazer
- Carlos Escalera
- Filiberto Rivera
