= Federico López =

Puerto Rican basketball player

Personal information
- Born: March 26, 1962 Mexico City, Mexico
- Died: November 6, 2006 (aged 44) Guaynabo, Puerto Rico
- Listed height: 6 ft 1 in (1.85 m)
- Listed weight: 180 lb (82 kg)

Career information
- Playing career: 1981–1997
- Position: Point guard

Career history
- 1981–1997: Mets de Guaynabo

Career highlights
- 2× BSN champion (1982, 1989); No. 5 retired by Mets de Guaynabo

Career BSN statistics
- Points: 6,105 (13.7 ppg)
- Rebounds: 1,926 (4.3 rpg)
- Assists: 2,440 (5.5 apg)
Medals
Men's basketball
Representing Puerto Rico
Pan American Games
Gold medal – first place	Havana 1991	Team competition
Bronze medal – third place	Indianapolis 1987	Team competition

Federico López Camacho (March 26, 1962 – November 6, 2006), better known as Fico López, was a Puerto Rican professional basketball player. He was a member of the Mets de Guaynabo from 1981 to 1997. Together with his brother-in-law, Mario Morales, López won various championships in the Puerto Rican league.

Although he was born in Mexico, López represented the Puerto Rican national team. He played for Puerto Rico at the FIBA World Championship in 1986, 1990, 1994 — and at the Olympics in 1988 and 1992. During the 1990 World Championship, he was named to the WC All-Tournament Team after leading the tournament in assists and helping Puerto Rico to its best ever finish, fourth, after losing the bronze game to the United States by two points.

== Personal life ==
López was born in Mexico City, Mexico, to Cuban parents. His father, Federico López Sr. was a star of Cuban basketball during the 1940s and 1950s. López was one of the star players of the national team of Puerto Rico. He was part of the first national Puerto Rican team to win a game against a national United States team (in Mexico).

== Death ==
López died in Guaynabo, Puerto Rico, on November 6, 2006. from an apparent heart attack while playing volleyball with his friends in Caparra Country Club, the court that bears his name and where he grew up in sports since the age of 8. López was 44 years old.
