= Polluelos de Aibonito =

Former Puerto Rican professional basketball team

Polluelos de Aibonto
- Leagues: Baloncesto Superior Nacional
- Founded: 1977
- History: Polluelos de Aibonito (1977–2002)
- Location: Aibonito, Puerto Rico
- Team colors: Green, yellow, white
- Championships: 1 (1986)

Polluelos de Aibonito was a Puerto Rican professional basketball team of the Baloncesto Superior Nacional based in Aibonito, Puerto Rico. They won their only national championship in 1986, defeating the 1985 champions Atleticos de San German, 4 games to 3, helped by stars Willie Meléndez, Angel Santiago, Rolando Frazer and Enrique Aponte, among others.

They returned to the BSN finals in 1987 but lost, also in seven games, to the Titanes de Morovis. The Polluelos franchise folded in 2002 after facing financial trouble.

== Notable players ==
Note: Flags indicate national team eligibility at FIBA-sanctioned events. Players may hold other non-FIBA nationalities not displayed.

Criteria

To appear in this section a player must have either:

- Set a club record or won an individual award while at the club
- Played at least one official international match for their national team at any time
- Played at least one official NBA match at any time.

- (Puerto Rico) Ángel Santiago
- (Puerto Rico) Enrique Aponte
- (Puerto Rico) Willie Meléndez
- (Panama) Rolando Frazer
- (United States) Litterial Green
- (United States) Marcus Liberty
- (United States) Ed Horton
- (United States) Bob McCann
- (United States) (Dominican Republic) Franklin Western
- (United States) (Venezuela) Askia Jones
