= Brujos de Guayama =

Basketball team of Guayama, Puerto Rico

- League: Baloncesto Superior Nacional
- Founded: 1971; 55 years ago
- Dissolved: 2022; 4 years ago
- History: Brujos de Guayama (1971–2022); Osos de Manatí (2023–present)
- Arena: Dr. Roque Nido Stella Coliseum
- Capacity: 3,500
- Location: Guayama, Puerto Rico
- Team colors: Black, gold, red, white
Home	Away	Third

Brujos de Guayama were a Puerto Rican professional basketball team of the Baloncesto Superior Nacional (BSN), based in Guayama, Puerto Rico. Despite being in the league since 1971, the team has not won any BSN Championships, but have two finals appearances, being a runner-up both in 1991 and 1994. In October 2022, rapper and singer Ozuna bought the team and relocated it to Manatí, Puerto Rico, and re-branded the team. They now participate in BSN as the Osos de Manatí.

== History ==
The team was founded in 1971. In the 1991 season the Brujos' lost to the Atleticos de San German in the finals. In the 1994 season the Brujos' lost again to the Atleticos de San German in the finals.

== Current roster ==
(Osos de Manatí roster)

== Notable players ==
To appear in this section a player must have either:
• Set a club record or won an individual award as a professional player.
• Played at least one official international match for his senior national team at any time.

- (United States) (Puerto Rico) James "El Presidente" Carter (born 1964) - 2x BSN MVP
- (Puerto Rico) Peter John Ramos (born 1985) - 1x BSN MVP
- (Venezuela) Richard Lugo (born 1973)
- (Puerto Rico) Alejandro Carmona (born 1983)
- (Puerto Rico) Renaldo Balkman (born 1984)
- (United States) Kyle Gibson (born 1987)

=== Former NBA players ===
To appear in this section a player must have:
- Played at least one official NBA match or has been drafted at any time.

- (United States) (Lebanon) Matt Freije
- (United States) (Puerto Rico) Renaldo Balkman
- (United States) Devin Ebanks
- (United States) Ben Davis
- (United States) Melvin Ely
- (United States) Al Thornton
- (United States) Josh Harrellson
- (United States) Terrence Williams
- (United States) Jamaal Franklin
- (United States) Joe Wylie
- (United States) Marcus Fizer
- (United States) Michael Sweetney
- (United States) Ricky Sánchez
- (Puerto Rico) Gian Clavell
- (United States) Walter Sharpe
- (Puerto Rico) Peter John Ramos

== Major trophies and awards ==
=== Domestic ===
- BSN Championship:
  - Runner-up (2): 1991, 1994
