= Titanes de Morovis =

Former BSN professional basketball team

The Titanes de Morovis (Morovis Titans) were a professional basketball team from Morovis, Puerto Rico, which played in the country's top pro basketball league, the BSN. They won their only national championship in 1987, defeating the 1986 champions Polluelos de Aibonito, 4 games to 3. The team disappeared in 2006 after years of economic and low fan support, they relocated to Fajardo. In 2023 and again in 2024 rumors began of a possible relocation or expansion to create a new team, nothing has come of this.

== Players ==
Notable former Titanes players include Wesley Correa, Mario Butler, and Mario Sanchez Rivera, the three of whom led the Titanes to the 1987 national title.
