= José Ortiz (basketball) =

Puerto Rican basketball player (1963–2026)

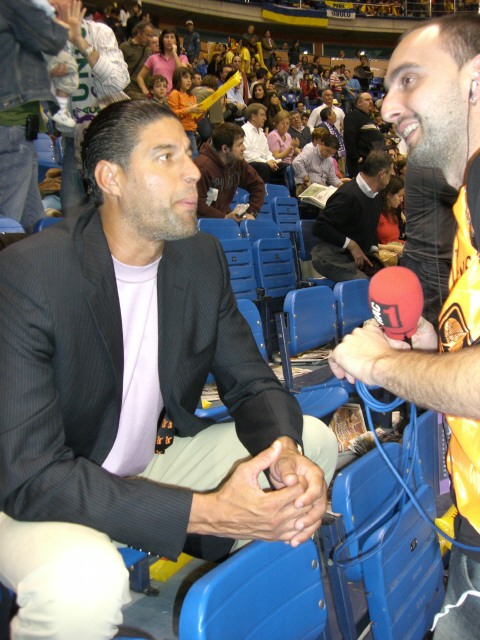
- Ortiz (left) in 2007

Personal information
- Born: October 25, 1963 Aibonito, Puerto Rico
- Died: May 5, 2026 (aged 62) San Juan, Puerto Rico
- Listed height: 6 ft 10 in (2.08 m)
- Listed weight: 260 lb (118 kg)

Career information
- High school: Benjamin Harrison (Cayey, Puerto Rico)
- College: Oregon State (1985–1987)
- NBA draft: 1987: 1st round, 15th overall pick
- Drafted by: Utah Jazz
- Playing career: 1980–2006
- Positions: Power forward, center
- Number: 4, 44

Career history
- 1980–1991: Atléticos de San Germán
- 1987–1988: CAI Zaragoza
- 1988–1990: Utah Jazz
- 1990: Real Madrid
- 1990–1992: FC Barcelona
- 1992–1993: Festina Andorra
- 1993–1994: Unicaja Polti
- 1994–1996: Atléticos de San Germán
- 1994–1995: Gymnastikos S. Larissas
- 1995–1996: Iraklio Crete
- 1996–1997: Aris
- 1997: Guaiqueríes de Margarita
- 1997–1998: Aris
- 1998–2005: Cangrejeros de Santurce
- 2006: Capitanes de Arecibo

Career highlights
- FIBA Korać Cup champion (1997); Spanish Cup winner (1991); Spanish League All-Star (1990); 2× Greek League All-Star (1996, 1997); 8× BSN champion (1985, 1991, 1994, 1998–2001, 2003); BSN Most Valuable Player (2002); LPB champion (1997); LPB Finals MVP (1997); No. 4 retired by Cangrejeros de Santurce; No. 4 retired by Puerto Rico National Team; Pac-10 Player of the Year (1987); 2× First-team All-Pac-10 (1986, 1987)

Career BSN statistics
- Points: 8,925 (17.7 ppg)
- Rebounds: 5,314 (10.5 rpg)
- Stats at NBA.com
- Stats at Basketball Reference
- FIBA Hall of Fame
Medals
Men's basketball
Representing Puerto Rico
FIBA AmeriCup
| Gold medal – first place | 1995 Argentina |
| Silver medal – second place | 1988 Uruguay |
| Silver medal – second place | 1993 Puerto Rico |
| Silver medal – second place | 1997 Uruguay |
| Bronze medal – third place | 2003 Puerto Rico |
Pan American Games
| Gold medal – first place | 1991 Cuba |
| Bronze medal – third place | 1987 USA |
Centrobasket
| Gold medal – first place | 1989 Cuba |
| Gold medal – first place | 1991 Mexico |
| Gold medal – first place | 1993 Puerto Rico |
| Gold medal – first place | 2001 Mexico |
| Gold medal – first place | 2003 Mexico |
| Silver medal – second place | 1999 Cuba |
Goodwill Games
| Gold medal – first place | 1994 Russia |

José Rafael "Piculín" Ortiz Rijos (October 25, 1963 – May 5, 2026) was a Puerto Rican professional basketball player. He played in the National Basketball Association (NBA), various European teams, and in Puerto Rico's Baloncesto Superior Nacional (BSN). Ortiz played college basketball for the Oregon State Beavers.

While he was in the NBA, he played with the Utah Jazz. He played with the Puerto Rican clubs Atléticos de San Germán, Cangrejeros de Santurce, and Capitanes de Arecibo, while he was in the Baloncesto Superior Nacional. Ortiz was also a member of the senior Puerto Rican national team, from 1983 to 2004. Most notably, he was a member of the 2004 Puerto Rican team that defeated the United States at the 2004 Summer Olympic Games in Athens, Greece. With Puerto Rico, Ortiz played in four different Summer Olympics, as he played at the 1988 Seoul Games, the 1992 Barcelona Games, the 1996 Atlanta Games, and the 2004 Athens Games.

Ortiz holds various honors and records as a basketball player. He ranks fourth and sixth among the all-time statistical leaders for rebounds per game and total rebounds, in the Baloncesto Superior Nacional league. He was also just the third player to have won eight championships in the BSN league. Ortiz was also the first Puerto Rican-born player that was drafted into the NBA. Many basketball experts consider Ortiz to be the best Puerto Rican basketball player of all-time.

Despite his success in sports, Ortiz went through financial troubles, after he retired from playing professional club basketball. In 2011, he was arrested for the possession of 218 marijuana plants. He was sentenced to six months in prison.

On August 30, 2019, Ortiz was inducted into the FIBA Basketball Hall of Fame, in honor of his career with the senior Puerto Rican national basketball team, and his club career, that spanned a period of 26 years.

== Early life and education ==
José Ortiz was born in Aibonito, Puerto Rico, on October 25, 1963, but he was raised in Cayey. His parents, German Ortiz and Elba Ríjos, were both school teachers.

Ortiz started his basketball career playing as a center, at Benjamin Harrison School in Cayey. He was nicknamed Piculín, after one of the characters in The Wizard of Oz and The Concorde, as a reference to the popular plane and his height (6'11"). Ortiz earned a Bachelor's degree in Communications from Oregon State University.

== College career ==
Ortiz attended Oregon State University, where he played college basketball with the Oregon State Beavers, from 1985 to 1987, under the team's head coach Ralph Miller. At Oregon State, he was a teammate of future Basketball Hall of Fame player Gary Payton, during the latter's freshman year. During his two seasons with the Beavers, Ortiz averaged 19.8 points and 8.7 rebounds per game. After the 1986–87 season, he was named the Pac-10 Player of the Year, finishing ahead of (among others) future Basketball Hall of Fame player Reggie Miller of UCLA, in the voting. Ortiz also earned an NCAA DI All-American Honorable Mention, in the 1986–87 season.

== Professional career ==
=== Puerto Rico ===
In 1980, at age 17, Ortiz debuted with the Atléticos de San Germán from the Baloncesto Superior Nacional league in Puerto Rico. As his career progressed, he improved his game significantly, and he led San Germán to a league championship in 1985. That season, Ortiz averaged more than 25 points and 14 rebounds per game. He would lead the team to a second league title in 1991, while he averaged 19 points and 15.8 rebounds per game. After the 1991 season, Ortiz left the Puerto Rican League to play in Europe. He would return to the league in 1994, and lead San Germán to yet another title.

In 1998, Ortiz was released by San Germán. He then went on to play with Cangrejeros de Santurce, and helped them win four titles in a row (1998–2001). In 2002, Ortiz was named the Most Valuable Player of the league, although his team did not reach the league's Finals. Ortiz and the Cangrejeros again won another league title, in 2003, making Ortiz only the third player to win eight titles in the league.

Ortiz played with Santurce for two more years, and in 2006, he played with the Capitanes de Arecibo. However, he retired after just one season with the team. He finished his career in the BSN league with 8,915 points, 5,314 rebounds (#6), and 1,134 assists, in 505 regular season games played. To this day, he is considered by many experts to be the best Puerto Rican basketball player.

=== NBA ===
After graduating from Oregon State University, Ortiz entered the 1987 NBA draft. He was selected in the first round, with the number 15 overall draft pick, by the Utah Jazz. However, before his first NBA season, he received an offer from CAI Zaragoza, of Spain's Liga ACB, and he accepted it. Ortiz rejoined the Jazz for the 1988–89 season, and he debuted with the team on November 9, 1988. During his first season, Ortiz played in 51 games, and he was a starter in 15 of those games. He averaged 2.8 points and 1.1 rebounds per game.

Ortiz returned to the NBA for the 1989–90 season, playing in 13 games with the Jazz, before being waived by the team on February 5, 1990. He finished his NBA career with an average of 2.9 points and 1.1 rebounds per game. Ortiz wore the number 44 during his NBA career.

=== Europe ===
Ortiz joined the Spanish ACB League club CAI Zaragoza in 1987. During the 1987–88 ACB season, he was the second leading scorer of the team, with a scoring average of 17.4 points per game. After that season, he returned to the U.S., to play with the Utah Jazz of the NBA.

After being waived by the Jazz in 1990, Ortiz was signed by the Spanish club Real Madrid. While a member of Real Madrid, he played with players such as Fernando Romay, Antonio Martín Espina, and José "Chechu" Biriukov. After that season, he moved to the Spanish club FC Barcelona Banca Catalana, where he won the 1991 edition of the Spanish King's Cup. With Barcelona, he also finished in second place in the 1990–91 FIBA European Champions Cup (EuroLeague) season. During the 1991–92 ACB season, he was one of the team's leading rebounders.

After that, Ortiz played with the Spanish clubs Festina Andorra (1992–93), Unicaja Polti (1993–94), and the Greek Basket League clubs Gymnastikos S. Larissas (1994–95), Iraklio Crete (1995–96), and Aris Thessaloniki (1996–97). Ortiz helped Aris to win the championship of the 1996–97 FIBA Korać Cup season. After his season with Aris, Ortiz was offered a two-year contract that was worth approximately $1 million in net income per season, by the Greek club PAOK Thessaloniki. However, the contract was declared null and void, when laboratory tests for steroids allegedly came back positive. Ortiz appealed the decision and won, but he refused to return to Europe to play.

=== Venezuela ===
In 1997, Ortiz played with Guaiqueríes de Margarita, of the Venezuelan League. With his club, he won the league's championship, and he was named the MVP of the league's finals.

== National team career ==
In 1982, Ortiz reached the minimum age to join Puerto Rico's national basketball team, and in 1983, he saw his first international competition, at the Pan American Games of Caracas, Venezuela. At the 1987 Pan American Games, Ortiz was the flag-bearer for Puerto Rico. They won the bronze medal at that tournament. Ortiz also helped the Puerto Rican National basketball team earn a gold medal at the 1991 Pan American Games, which were held in Havana, Cuba.

After the 2002 FIBA World Cup, which was held at Indianapolis, Ortiz announced his retirement from the national team, to coincide with national teammate Jerome Mincy's retirement from the team. However, Ortiz would later reconsider his decision to retire, and he rejoined the national team. In 2004, he was a part of the Puerto Rican team that defeated the 2004 Team USA at the Athens Summer Olympics.

Overall, Ortiz played with Puerto Rico's national team at four FIBA World Cups (1990, 1994, 1998, and 2002), and at four Summer Olympics (1988, 1992, 1996, and 2004).

== Other ventures ==
=== Entrepreneur ===
Ortiz opened a restaurant called Patria, in his hometown of Cayey. However, in 2003, the restaurant went bankrupt.

=== Politics ===
Ortiz became interested in politics, after meeting politician Ferdinand Pérez in 2000. Pérez sought Ortiz's advice for legislative measures related to sports. Ortiz eventually accepted to run for Senator, behind Pérez's campaign for Mayor of San Juan, for the Popular Democratic Party. Ortiz ran for senatorial candidate from the district of San Juan-Guaynabo, in Puerto Rico's 2008 general elections. However, both their bids were unsuccessful. Pérez has said that Ortiz distanced from politics after the defeat.

=== Social activism ===
On May 28, 2011, Ortiz officially opened the Piculín Ortiz Basketball Institute, in Cayey. The former center aimed to develop the basketball skills and performance of local children and teenagers.

== Trayectoria deportiva ==
=== Early life ===
Ortiz was born in the town of Aibonito, Puerto Rico, but was raised in Cayey. He began his career as a center at Benjamin Harrison High School in Cayey. He received the nickname "Piculín" from a neighbor because of his mischievous behavior. He was also known as "El Concorde," in reference to the popular aircraft and his height. This latter nickname was given by BSN commentator Don Manuel Rivera Morales.

=== Puerto Rico (BSN) ===
Ortiz began playing basketball in Puerto Rico's league in 1981, when he was approximately 17 years old. He debuted with the Atléticos de San Germán, where he remained for 15 seasons. As his career progressed, his skills improved significantly, leading San Germán to a championship in 1985. That season, he averaged more than 25 points and 14 rebounds per game. He later guided his team to a second championship in 1991, while averaging 19 points and 15.8 rebounds. After the 1991 season, he left the league to play in Europe.

=== College career ===
Ortiz attended Oregon State University from 1985 to 1987, where he was coached by Ralph Miller. He was also a teammate of future Naismith Memorial Basketball Hall of Fame member Gary Payton during Payton's freshman year. Over his two seasons with the Beavers, Ortiz averaged 19.8 points and 8.7 rebounds per game. At the end of the 1986–87 season, he was named Pac-10 Player of the Year, surpassing, among others, Reggie Miller of University of California, Los Angeles.

== Personal life ==
Ortiz married actress Nirita Ruíz, with whom he had one daughter, Volleyball player Neira, and whom he had met during the filming of a commercial for Aqua Velva, in which both acted. He also had a son from a previous relationship. However, the couple divorced in 2006. He was in a relationship with Sylvia Ríos from 2009, and married her in 2021.

=== Legal problems ===
On June 29, 2011, Ortiz was arrested for drug related charges. Federal agents seized 218 marijuana plants in a rented property, along with munitions for AR-15 rifles. Ortiz allegedly claimed possession of all the material during the arrest. At the bail hearing, Ortiz was legally represented by a public defender, since he claimed he had no money for a lawyer. At the hearing, the judge decided to send Ortiz to a rehabilitation clinic.

On November 4, 2011, Ortiz declared himself guilty of the charges against him. The next week, he failed a surprise drug test, which revealed he had used cocaine. Magistrate Judge of the United States District Court for the District of Puerto Rico Camille Vélez Rivé ordered the immediate imprisonment of Ortiz, arguing that she had given him several opportunities already. On March 29, 2012, he was sentenced to six months in prison.

=== Health and death ===
In 2023, Ortiz was diagnosed with colorectal cancer.

On January 14, 2025, he had surgery to treat his cancer and was released after two weeks in the hospital for the surgery, but was re-hospitalized days after, and the Puerto Rican Basketball Federation announced that blood donations were needed for the former basketball player.

Ortiz died in San Juan on May 5, 2026, at Ashford Presbyterian Community Hospital in San Juan, Puerto Rico at the age of 62.

== Career statistics ==
Legend
| GP | Games played | GS | Games started | MPG | Minutes per game |
| FG% | Field goal percentage | 3P% | 3-point field goal percentage | FT% | Free throw percentage |
| RPG | Rebounds per game | APG | Assists per game | SPG | Steals per game |
| BPG | Blocks per game | PPG | Points per game | **Bold** | Career high |

=== NCAA ===
| Year | Team | GP | GS | MPG | FG% | 3P% | FT% | RPG | APG | SPG | BPG | PPG |
|---|---|---|---|---|---|---|---|---|---|---|---|---|
| 1985–86 | Oregon State | 22 | - | 34.8 | .515 | - | .664 | 8.5 | 1.3 | 0.6 | **1.5** | 16.4 |
| 1986–87 | Oregon State | **30** | - | **36.7** | **.584** | **.500** | **.725** | **8.7** | **1.6** | **1.2** | 1.4 | **22.3** |
| Career | | 52 | - | 35.9 | .557 | .500 | .703 | 8.7 | 1.5 | 0.9 | 1.4 | 19.8 |

=== NBA ===
| Year | Team | GP | GS | MPG | FG% | 3P% | FT% | RPG | APG | SPG | BPG | PPG |
|---|---|---|---|---|---|---|---|---|---|---|---|---|
| 1988–89 | Utah | **51** | **15** | **6.4** | .440 | .000 | .596 | 1.1 | 0.2 | 0.2 | 0.1 | 2.8 |
| 1989–90 | Utah | 13 | 0 | 4.9 | **.452** | **.500** | **.600** | **1.2** | **0.5** | 0.2 | 0.1 | **3.2** |
| Career | | 64 | 15 | 6.1 | .443 | .333 | .596 | 1.1 | 0.3 | 0.2 | 0.1 | 2.9 |

=== BSN ===
| Year | Team | GP | FG% | 3P% | FT% | RPG | APG | PPG |
|---|---|---|---|---|---|---|---|---|
| 1980 | San Germán | 6 | .500 | .000 | .800 | 0.7 | 0.0 | 1.7 |
| 1981 | San Germán | 9 | .357 | .000 | .400 | 1.6 | 0.0 | 1.6 |
| 1982 | San Germán | 14 | .356 | .000 | .500 | 3.1 | 0.0 | 2.9 |
| 1983 | San Germán | **33** | .549 | .000 | .606 | 10.3 | 0.6 | 14.1 |
| 1984 | San Germán | 29 | .575 | .000 | .631 | 13.1 | 1.1 | 21.1 |
| 1985 | San Germán | 29 | .610 | .400 | .660 | 14.4 | 0.9 | **25.5** |
| 1986 | San Germán | 24 | .568 | .000 | .678 | 11.3 | 1.7 | 18.8 |
| 1987 | San Germán | 22 | .636 | **.500** | .769 | 13.7 | 1.8 | 23.7 |
| 1988 | San Germán | 31 | .590 | .200 | .768 | 11.5 | 2.3 | 20.2 |
| 1989 | San Germán | 23 | .569 | .000 | .752 | 11.0 | 2.1 | 19.7 |
| 1990 | San Germán | 19 | .630 | .688 | .774 | 12.7 | 2.8 | 22.5 |
| 1991 | San Germán | 11 | .614 | .333 | .768 | **15.8** | 2.3 | 19.9 |
| 1994 | San Germán | 14 | .636 | .000 | **.818** | 9.6 | 3.4 | 17.3 |
| 1995 | San Germán | 19 | .594 | .296 | .731 | 11.8 | 2.9 | 20.2 |
| 1996 | San Germán | 25 | **.647** | .400 | .711 | 13.8 | 3.3 | 20.5 |
| 1998 | Santurce | 29 | .608 | .269 | .704 | 12.6 | 3.5 | 19.3 |
| 1999 | Santurce | 18 | .609 | .250 | .667 | 10.1 | 3.3 | 20.6 |
| 2000 | Santurce | 28 | .575 | .273 | .663 | 9.0 | 3.0 | 18.0 |
| 2001 | Santurce | 23 | .576 | .238 | .656 | 10.1 | 2.8 | 19.7 |
| 2002 | Santurce | 27 | .603 | .333 | .629 | 9.6 | 3.3 | 19.4 |
| 2003 | Santurce | 16 | .457 | .318 | .464 | 8.6 | **3.6** | 14.1 |
| 2004 | Santurce | 29 | .498 | .000 | .623 | 7.4 | 3.0 | 10.4 |
| 2005 | Santurce | 23 | .496 | .286 | .404 | 6.5 | 1.9 | 10.9 |
| 2006 | Arecibo | 4 | .474 | .000 | .500 | 5.5 | 1.5 | 5.0 |
| Career | | 505 | .582 | .307 | .680 | 10.5 | 2.2 | 17.7 |

== See also ==
- List of Puerto Ricans
- Puerto Rico Men's National Basketball Team
- Puerto Rico at the 2004 Summer Olympics
- Elías Larry Ayuso
- Carlos Arroyo
