= Baloncesto Superior Nacional =

First-tier-level men's professional basketball league in Puerto Rico

- Founded: 1929; 97 years ago
- First season: 1930 (as LPB)
- Country: Puerto Rico
- Federation: Puerto Rican Basketball Federation
- Confederation: FIBA Americas
- Number of teams: 12
- Level on pyramid: 1
- International cup: Champions League Americas
- Current champions: Vaqueros de Bayamón (18 titles)
- Most championships: Vaqueros de Bayamón (18 titles)
- All-time top scorer: Georgie Torres (15,863)
- TV partners: Telemundo Puerto Rico; DirecTV Puerto Rico
- Website: www.bsnpr.com
- 2026 Baloncesto Superior Nacional season

The Baloncesto Superior Nacional, abbreviated as BSN, is the first tier-level professional men's basketball league in Puerto Rico. It was founded in 1929 and is organized by the Puerto Rican Basketball Federation.

The Baloncesto Superior Nacional, which is played under FIBA rules, currently consists of 12 teams, of which the most successful has been the Vaqueros de Bayamón with 18 titles as of 2026.

The league has produced players that have distinguished themselves in the NBA, EuroLeague, Spain's ACB, and other tournaments throughout the world. Among them, Georgie Torres was the first Puerto Rican to sign an NBA contract & Butch Lee was the first BSN player to win an NBA title. Later on players including José Ortiz, Ramón Rivas, Daniel Santiago, Carlos Arroyo and J. J. Barea, started their careers playing for BSN teams and later played in the NBA.

== Competition format ==
BSN games are played under the regular FIBA basketball rules. The twelve teams each play a total of four games amongst themselves, two at home and two away, for a total of 34 games during the regular season. Of the 12 participating teams, the top 8 move on to the postseason. The final two teams left will play in the La Final Brava, or the Brava Final, a basketball tournament sponsored by Brava Lubricants.

=== Rules ===
- Salary Cap - A soft cap of $1 million and a hard cap of $1.5 million per team.
- Reinforcements - A limit of a third reinforcement per team will remain for the 2026 season, but 6 changes to reinforcements are allowed before deadline, and an additional 2 replacements in postseason.
- Franchise Son - Allows teams to protect and recruit a local player before the rookie draft; is designed to protect local development and keep players connected to the communities where they trained. The rule was used in 2026 by Arecibo to claim RJ Meléndez.

== History ==
The league began in 1930, and is noted for having had several head coaches who went on to achieve international recognition later in their careers. Among those are Basketball Hall of Fame members Dr. Jack Ramsay, Tex Winter and Red Holzman, who coached the Leones de Ponce in the 1950s and 1960s, and Phil Jackson, who coached the Piratas de Quebradillas and Gallitos de Isabela in the late 1980s. Others notable coaches who have worked for BSN teams include Gene Bartow, Lou Rossini, Del Harris, P. J. Carlesimo, Bernie Bickerstaff, Herb Brown and Sergio Hernández.

During the 1980s, notable players followed in the footsteps of players such as Juan "Pachin" Vicens (1959 Santiago Chile FIBA World Championship's All-Tournament Team) and Butch Lee, the first Puerto Rican and BSN player to enter the NBA. Among those are: Mario 'Quijote' Morales, Raymond Dalmau, Jose 'Piculin' Ortiz, Ramón Rivas, Jerome Mincy, Georgie Torres, Angelo Cruz, Angel Santiago, the late Federico 'Fico' Lopez, Rolando Frazer, Mario Butler, and Rubén Rodríguez, who showcased their talents to all of Puerto Rico's TV viewers and game goers.

=== New Era and Renewed Interest (2019-present) ===
On September 19, 2019, the BSN team owners selected Ricardo Dalmau Santana to succeed Fernando Quiñones Bodea as president of the league.

In October 2020, there was a change in ownership of the Vaqueros de Bayamón, when retired professional baseball player Yadier Molina acquired his hometown team. In April 2021, the league approved the return of the Cangrejeros under the ownership of Noah Assad and Jonathan Miranda. Later that month, Bad Bunny joined the ownership group. In October 2022, the Osos de Manatí returned from a short hiatus, when Puerto Rican singer Ozuna purchased the Brujos de Guayama and relocated the team to Manatí.

In game 1 of the 2023 BSN finals, LeBron James made a surprise appearance as the Gigantes defeated the Vaqueros, 89-85, in overtime to take a 1-0 series lead. On July 27 2023, the Gigantes De Carolina defeated the Vaqueros 80-60 in Game 5 of the BSN Finals, leading the Gigantes to become the 2023 BSN Champions.

In October of 2024, Molina sold ownership of his team to Eric Duars, of Duars Entertainment a spanish music label.

In May of 2026, It was announced that Dion New had acquired the Indios de Mayaguez, during the BSN All-Star weekend. Dion returns to BSN team ownership after selling the Piratas to Ernesto Cambo in October of 2025.

Just before the start of the 2026 BSN playoffs, the league had announced it had reached a broadcasting agreement with NBC Sports and Peacock, to transmit the conference finals and league finals to viewers through its regional sports networks in Boston, Philadelphia, and California.

Owners' List
Team	Year Acquired	Owner(s)
Atléticos de San German	2021	José Rivera & Juan Ramón
Cangrejeros de Santurce	2021	Noah Assad, Jonathan Miranda, & Bad Bunny
Capitanes de Arecibo	2022	José Manuel Baeza
Criollos de Caguas	2023	Ric Elias
Gigantes de Carolina/Canovanas	2021	Héctor Horta
Indios de Mayagüez	2026	Dion New
Leones de Ponce	2015	Misla Family (Misla Hospitality Group)
Mets de Guaynabo	2019	Marc D. Grossman & Mark Linder
Cariduros de Fajardo	2022	Ozuna
Piratas de Quebradillas	2025	Ernesto “Ernie” Cambó
Santeros de Aguada	2016	Wilson López
Vaqueros de Bayamón	2025	Eric Duars

== Current teams ==
Locations of teams participating in 2026 season

Team	Home city	Year established	Arena	Capacity
Atléticos de San German	San Germán	1930	Arquelio Torres Ramírez Coliseum	5,000
Cangrejeros de Santurce	Santurce	1918	Roberto Clemente Coliseum	9,000
Cariduros de Fajardo	Fajardo	1973	Tomás Dones Coliseum	5,000
Capitanes de Arecibo	Arecibo	1946	Manuel Iguina Coliseum	12,000
Criollos de Caguas	Caguas	1976	Coliseo Roger Mendoza	3,000
Gigantes de Carolina/Canovanas	Canovanas	1971	Carlos Miguel Mangual Coliseum	5,000
Indios de Mayagüez	Mayagüez	1956	Palacio de Recreación y Deportes	5,500
Leones de Ponce	Ponce	1946	Juan Pachín Vicéns Auditorium	11,000
Mets de Guaynabo	Gurabo*	1935	Fernando Hernández Coliseum*	3,500
Piratas de Quebradillas	Quebradillas	1926	Raymond Dalmau Coliseum	5,500
Santeros de Aguada	Aguada	1992	Ismael Delgado Coliseum	6,000
Vaqueros de Bayamón	Bayamón	1930	Ruben Rodriguez Coliseum	12,000

* Mets de Guaynabo will play their 2026 season in Gurabo, due to the renovation of their arena.

== Defunct teams ==
- Atenienses de Manatí (2014–2017); Juan Cruz Abreu Coliseum
- Avancinos de Villalba (1996–1998); José Ibem Marrero Coliseum
- Brujos de Guayama (1971–2022); Dr. Roque Nido Stella Coliseum
- Cardenales de Rio Piedras (1940–1985); Rubén Zayas Montañez Court
- Caciques de Humacao (2010-2018); Marcelo Trujillo Coliseum.
- Cariduros de Fajardo (1973–1998; 2007-2008; 2017-2020; 2021-2023);Tomás Dones Coliseum
- Conquistadores de Aguada (1994–1998); Aguada Coliseum
- Gallitos de Isabela (1969–2005; 2010-2011; 2017); José Abreu Buga Coliseum
- Grises de Humacao (2005–2010; 2021-2023) Marcelo Trujillo Panisse Coliseum
- Indios de Canóvanas (1980–1996); Coliseo Carlos Miguel Mangual
- Maratonistas de Coamo (1985–1996, 1999-2008; 2011; 2014-2015); Edwin "Puruco" Nolasco Coliseum
- Osos de Manatí (2023-2026); Juan Cruz Abreu Coliseum
- Polluelos de Aibonito (1977–2001); Cancha Marron Aponte
- Taínos de Cabo Rojo (1989–1993); Rebekah Colberg Cabrera Coliseum
- Tiburones de Aguadilla (1992–1997); Luis T. Diaz Coliseum
- Titanes de Morovis (1977–2006); José Pepe Huyke Coliseum
- Toritos de Cayey (2002–2004); Cayey Municipal Coliseum

== Championships ==
=== Number of championships won by teams ===
Teams	Finals	Championships	Runners-up	Years won	Years runners-up
Vaqueros de Bayamón	28	18	10	1933, 1935, 1967, 1969, 1971, 1972, 1973, 1974, 1975, 1981, 1988, 1995, 1996, 2009, 2020, 2022, 2025, 2026	1930, 1934, 1970, 2001, 2002, 2005, 2010, 2016, 2018, 2023
Atléticos de San Germán	26	14	12	1932, 1938, 1939, 1941, 1942, 1942-1943, 1947, 1948, 1949, 1950, 1985, 1991, 1994, 1997	1931, 1933, 1936*, 1938*, 1940, 1954, 1955, 1956, 1957, 1965, 1986, 2022
Leones de Ponce	26	14	12	1952, 1954, 1960, 1961, 1964, 1965, 1966, 1990, 1992, 1993, 2002, 2004, 2014, 2015	1949, 1958, 1963, 1967, 1989, 1995, 1996, 1998, 2003, 2013, 2019, 2025
Cangrejeros de Santurce	14	8	6	1962, 1968, 1998, 1999, 2000, 2001, 2003, 2007	1942, 1942–1943, 1951, 1952, 1964, 2006
Capitanes de Arecibo	19	8	11	1959, 2005, 2008, 2010, 2011, 2016, 2018, 2021	1932, 1946, 1948, 1961, 1966, 1992, 2007, 2012, 2014, 2015, 2017
Cardenales de Río Piedras	15	6	9	1946, 1955, 1956, 1957,1963, 1976	1941, 1947, 1959, 1960, 1962, 1968, 1969, 1971, 1977
Piratas de Quebradillas	18	6	12	1970, 1977, 1978, 1979, 2013, 2017	1937, 1972, 1973, 1975, 1976, 1980, 1982, 1999, 2000, 2009, 2011, 2020
Capitalinos de San Juan	9	5	4	1930, 1931, 1940, 1945, 1958	1943, 1944, 1950, 1974
Mets de Guaynabo	10	3	7	1980, 1982, 1989	1978, 1981, 1983, 1985, 1990, 1993, 2021
Vega Baja	4	2	2	1934, 1937	1935, 1939
Gallitos de la UPR	3	2	1	1944, 1951	1945
Indios de Canóvanas	3	2	1	1983, 1984	1988
Club Náutico San Juan	1	1	0	1936	—
Polluelos de Aibonito	2	1	1	1986	1987
Titanes de Morovis	1	1	0	1987	—
Criollos de Caguas	2	2	0	2006, 2024	—
Indios de Mayagüez	1	1	0	2012	—
Santeros de Aguada	2	1	1	2019	2026
Gigantes de Carolina	4	1	3	2023	1979, 1997, 2008
Brujos de Guayama	2	0	2	—	1991, 1994
Gallitos de Isabela	1	0	1	—	1984
Maratonistas de Coamo	1	0	1	—	2004
Osos de Manatí	1	0	1	—	2024

- *These titles are from Farmacia Martin, a team that later merged with the Atléticos de San Germán

== BSN awards and leaders ==
=== League records ===
Rubén Rodríguez established most of the early long-standing records in the BSN. He broke both the single-season points record with 810 in 1978 and the highest career points record with 11,549. The current holder of the career mark is Georgie Torres, who broke it before retiring in 2001 with 15,863 points in 679 games, playing his first 7 years before the establishment of the three-point line. Rodríguez also holds the mark for most rebounds in a career with 6,178. He also held the single-season rebound record with 380 in 1978, which stood until Lee Benson broke it in 2008. Currently, Neftalí Rivera holds the record for most points in a game in the Baloncesto Superior Nacional when he scored 79 points on May 22, 1974. In that game he achieved the record by making 34 field goals (all of them 2-pointers as 3-pointers were not adopted back then) and 11 free throws. In 1989, Pablo Alicea of the Gigantes de Carolina established a record for most assists in one game with 25. The record stood for over two decades until May 1, 2012, when Jonathan García of the Caciques de Humacao broke it recording 33 assists against the Brujos de Guayama. García's mark is an unofficial world record pending the approval of Guinness World Records, since there is no higher number recorded in any amateur or professional international league or in FIBA competition. During this game, the Caciques also established the team points record for a single game with 130 and for most scored during a single (10-minute) quarter with 46. The Vaqueros de Bayamón hosted the game with highest attendance in the league, with 17,621 fans attending a home game against Río Piedras on September 8, 1969. This bested the previous top of 16,564 in a game between Ponce and Santurce. The Vaqueros also hold the record for most consecutive championships, winning five from 1971 to 1975.

=== BSN statistical leaders ===
^	Active player
*	Inducted into the FIBA Hall of Fame

=== BSN all-time scoring leaders ===
Rank	Player	Position(s)	Nationality	Years	Total points	Games played	Points per game average
1	Georgie Torres	SG	Puerto Rico	1975–2001	15,863	679	23.4
2	Mario Morales	SF	Puerto Rico	1975–1998	15,293	675	22.7
3	Mario Butler	C	Panama	1980–2008	12,252	779	15.7
4	Rolando Frazer	C	Panama	1980–2001	12,096	603	20.1
5	Raymond Dalmau	PG	Puerto Rico	1966–1985	11,592	537	21.6
6	Rubén Rodríguez	PF	Puerto Rico	1969–1991	11,549	631	18.3
7	Roberto Ríos	PG	Puerto Rico	1978–2000	11,312	681	16.6
8	Ángel Santiago	SF	Puerto Rico	1973–1996	11,287	617	18.3
9	José Quiñones	PF	Puerto Rico	1976–1995	11,012	579	19
10	Christian Dalmau	PG	Puerto Rico	1992–2003, 2009–2017	10,570	639	16.5

=== BSN all-time rebounding leaders ===
Rank	Player	Pos	Years	Reb	GP	RPG
1	Mario Butler	C	1980–2008	8,236	779	10.6
2	Rubén Rodríguez	F/C	1969–1991	6,178	631	9.8
3	Rolando Frazer	C	1980–2001	6,153	603	10.2
4	Raymond Dalmau	F/C	1966–1985	5,673	537	10.6
5	Mario Morales	G/F	1975–1998	5,665	675	8.4
6	José Ortíz	C	1980–2006	5,314	505	10.5
7	Carlos Bermúdez	F	1970–1984	4,884	422	11.6
8	Edgar de León	F/C	1981–2001	4,837	493	9.8
9	Teófilo Cruz*	C	1957–1982	4,672	584	8
10	Ángel Santiago	F	1973–1996	4,447	617	7.2

=== BSN all-time assists leaders ===
Rank	Player	Position(s)	Years	Total AST	GP	APG
1	James Carter	PG	1987–2006	3,025	543	5.6
2	Christian Dalmau	PG/SG	1992–2003, 2009–2017	2,931	639	4.6
3	Pablo Alicea	PG	1987–2006	2,762	503	5.5
4	Javier Antonio Colón	PG	1987–2008	2,748	555	5.0
5	Federico López	PG	1981–1997	2,440	446	5.5
6	Wilfredo Pagan	PG	1992–2018	2,367	652	3.6
7	Roberto Ríos	G/F	1978–2000	2,315	681	3.4
8	Raymond Dalmau	F/C	1966–1985	2,302	537	5.1
9	Bobby Joe Hatton	PG	1994–2012	2,235	489	4.6
10	George Torres	G/F	1975–2001	2,203	679	3.2

=== BSN all-time block leaders ===
Rank	Player	Position(s)	Nationality	Total blocks	Games played	Blocks per game average
1	Kleon Penn	C	Puerto Rico; British Virgin Islands	755	300	—
2	Jeffrion Aubry	C	Puerto Rico	642	—	—
3	Peter John Ramos	C	Puerto Rico	527	—	—
4	Carmelo Lee	SF	Puerto Rico	414	—	—
5	Jorge Brian Diaz	C	Puerto Rico	314	—	—
6	JaJa Richards	C	United States Virgin Islands	314	—	—
7	Luis 'PelaCoco' Hernández	C/F	Puerto Rico	295	—	—
8	Ricardo Sanchéz	C/PF	Puerto Rico	278	—	—
9	Nathanael Davis	C	United States	268	—	—
10	Alphonse Dyer	C	United States	255	—	—

Last Updated July 26, 2023

== See also ==
- BSN All-Star Game
- BSN Draft
- Puerto Rico national basketball team
