= 2018 Baloncesto Superior Nacional season =

Baloncesto Superior Nacional
- Season: 2018
- Duration: May 5, 2018 – September 23, 2018
- Games played: 36
- Teams: 8
- TV partners: WAPA 2 Deportes, DirecTV

Regular season
- Season MVP: (United States) Reyshawn Terry

Finals
- Champions: Capitanes de Arecibo
- Runners-up: Vaqueros de Bayamón
- Finals MVP: (United States Virgin Islands) Walter Hodge

Statistical leaders
Points	(United States) Reyshawn Terry	23.5
Rebounds	(United States) Reyshawn Terry	7.8
Assists	(Puerto Rico) Carlos Arroyo	7.3
- All statistics correct as of January 9, 2019.

The 2018 Baloncesto Superior Nacional season was the 89th season of the Baloncesto Superior Nacional (BSN).

Piratas de Quebradillas was the defending champion.

== League news ==
On September 1, the league announced it will not control the Atléticos de San Germán for the upcoming 2018 BSN season, after activating the team last season. There was a commitment to run the team under receivership for a single year until a new owner was found. The good performance of the team has raised the interest of several groups to buy the franchise with a view to the 2018 tournament. On September 14, league president Fernando Quiñones was hopeful that both the A's and Indians' franchise will see action next season under their own administrations although talks are still in preliminary stages. In the coming weeks will know the future of the Atléticos de San Germán and the Indios de Mayagüez in Baloncesto Superior Nacional (BSN).

On October 31, league president Fernando Quiñones, announced the tournament could begin in late April or early May.

The league held its first meeting since Hurricane Maria on November 16, 2017. The meeting was also attended with the representation of the franchises of Arecibo, Aguada, Bayamón, Guayama, Fajardo, Isabela, Santurce, San Germán, Ponce, Mayagüez and Quebradillas.

== Teams ==
=== Venues and locations ===
Locations of teams participating in 2018 season

Team	Location	Arena	Capacity
Atléticos de San Germán	San Germán, Puerto Rico	Arquelio Torres Ramírez Coliseum	5,000
Cariduros de Fajardo	Fajardo, Puerto Rico	Tomás Dones Coliseum	8,000
Caciques de Humacao	Humacao, Puerto Rico	Humacao Arena	8,000
Capitanes de Arecibo	Arecibo, Puerto Rico	Manuel Iguina Coliseum	12,000
Leones de Ponce	Ponce, Puerto Rico	Juan Pachín Vicéns Auditorium	12,000
Santeros de Aguada	Aguada, Puerto Rico	Ismael Delgado Coliseum	7,500
Piratas de Quebradillas	Quebradillas, Puerto Rico	Raymond Dalmau Coliseum	6,130
Vaqueros de Bayamón	Guaynabo, Puerto Rico	Mario Morales Coliseum	5,500

=== Personnel and sponsorship ===
Team	Head coach	Captain	Kit manufacturer	Jersey sponsor
Atléticos de San Germán	(Puerto Rico) Ferdie Toro			Dodge; Jeep
Cariduros de Fajardo	(Puerto Rico) Allans Colón			
Caciques de Humacao	(Puerto Rico) Manolo Cintrón			Jeep
Capitanes de Arecibo	(Puerto Rico) Rafael Cruz			
Leones de Ponce				
Santeros de Aguada	(Puerto Rico) Eddie Casiano			
Piratas de Quebradillas				Dodge; Jeep
Vaqueros de Bayamón	(Puerto Rico) Nelson Colón			

== Regular season ==
=== Stage 1 ===
Pos	Team	W	L	PCT	GB	Qualification
1	Vaqueros de Bayamón	24	12	.667	—	Advance to Stage 2
2	Capitanes de Arecibo	22	14	.611	2	Advance to Stage 2
3	Piratas de Quebradillas	21	15	.583	3	Advance to Stage 2
4	Leones de Ponce	18	18	.500	6	Advance to Stage 2
5	Santeros de Aguada	16	20	.444	8	Advance to Stage 2
6	Cariduros de Fajardo	16	20	.444	8	Advance to Stage 2
7	Atléticos de San Germán	14	21	.400	9.5	
8	Caciques de Humacao	12	23	.343	11.5	

Source: Latinbasket

=== Stage 2 ===
==== Group A ====
Pos	Team	W	L	PCT	GB	Qualification
1	Vaqueros de Bayamón	4	3	.571	—	Advance to semi-finals
2	Leones de Ponce	4	3	.571	—	Advance to semi-finals
3	Santeros de Aguada	1	6	.143	3	

Source: Latinbasket

==== Group B ====
Pos	Team	W	L	PCT	GB	Qualification
1	Capitanes de Arecibo	4	3	.571	—	Advance to semi-finals
2	Piratas de Quebradillas	4	3	.571	—	Advance to semi-finals
3	Cariduros de Fajardo	4	3	.571	—	

Source: Latinbasket

== Individual statistics ==
=== Points ===
Rank	Name	Team	Games	Points	PPG
1.	(United States) Reyshawn Terry	Piratas de Quebradillas	36	835	23.2
2.	(United States) Brandon Costner	Caciques de Humacao	34	668	19.6
3.	(Puerto Rico) Carlos Arroyo	Cariduros de Fajardo	35	564	16.1

=== Rebounds ===
Rank	Name	Team	Games	Rebounds	RPG
1.					
2.					
3.					

=== Assists ===
Rank	Name	Team	Games	Assists	APG
1.					
2.					
3.					

=== Other statistics ===
Category	Player	Team	Games	Average
Steals	(Cuba) Ismael Romero	Vaqueros de Bayamón	35	1.2
Blocks	(Puerto Rico) Jorge Díaz	Piratas de Quebradillas	50	1.42
Turnovers	(United States) Brandon Costner	Caciques de Humacao	34	2.9
2P%				
3P%	(Puerto Rico) Kyle Viñales	Caciques de Humacao	26	47.2%
FT%	(Puerto Rico) Kyle Viñales	Caciques de Humacao	26	93.4%

== Playoffs ==
Quarterfinals
1
8
4
5
2
7
3
6

Semifinals

Finals

== Awards ==
=== Most Valuable Player ===
- (United States) Reyshawn Terry (Piratas de Quebradillas)

=== Rookie of the Year ===
- (Puerto Rico) Ángel Rodríguez (Vaqueros de Bayamón)

=== Coach of the Year ===
- (Puerto Rico) Nelson Colón (Vaqueros de Bayamón)

=== Owner of the Year ===
- (Puerto Rico) Alfredo Gotay (Vaqueros de Bayamón)

=== Sixth Man of the Year ===
- (Puerto Rico) Chris Gastón (Santeros de Aguada)

=== Most Improved Player ===
- (Puerto Rico) Jonathan Rodríguez (Santeros de Aguada)

=== Comeback of the Year ===
- (Puerto Rico) Jezreel De Jesús (Atléticos de San Germán)

== Player movements ==
=== NBA ===
List of players that have played in the 2017 BSN season to have been selected to play in the NBA in the United States.

Date	Player name	Former team	New team / league	Refs
November 20, 2017	(United States) Damien Wilkins	(Puerto Rico) Brujos de Guayama	NBA - Indiana Pacers	
