= 2016 Baloncesto Superior Nacional season =

Baloncesto Superior Nacional
- Season: 87
- Duration: February 26, 2016 – June 15, 2016
- Games played: 36
- Teams: 11
- TV partners: WAPA 2 Deportes, DirecTV

Regular season
- Top seed: Vaqueros de Bayamón
- Season MVP: (Puerto Rico) Ángel Daniel Vassallo

Finals
- Champions: Capitanes de Arecibo (6th title)
- Runners-up: Vaqueros de Bayamón
- Finals MVP: (Puerto Rico) Renaldo Balkman

Statistical leaders
Points	(United States) Damion James	18.2
Rebounds	(United States) Damion James	11.0
Assists	(Puerto Rico) Alex Abreu	7.7
- All statistics correct as of June 17, 2016.

The 2016 BSN season was the 87th season of the Baloncesto Superior Nacional.

== Teams ==
=== 2016 teams ===
Locations of teams participating in 2016 BSN season

Team	Location	Arena	Capacity
Atenienses de Manatí	Manatí, Puerto Rico	Juan Cruz Abreu Coliseum	8,000
Leones de Ponce	Ponce, Puerto Rico	Juan Pachín Vicéns Auditorium	12,000
Atléticos de San Germán	San Germán, Puerto Rico	Arquelio Torres Ramírez Coliseum	5,000
Vaqueros de Bayamón	Bayamón, Puerto Rico	Ruben Rodriguez Coliseum	12,000
Santeros de Aguada	Aguada, Puerto Rico	Ismael Delgado Coliseum	7,500
Cangrejeros de Santurce	San Juan, Puerto Rico	Roberto Clemente Coliseum	9,000
Piratas de Quebradillas	Quebradillas, Puerto Rico	Raymond Dalmau Coliseum	6,130
Capitanes de Arecibo	Arecibo, Puerto Rico	Manuel Iguina Coliseum	12,000
Indios de Mayagüez	Mayagüez, Puerto Rico	Palacio de Recreación y Deportes	5,500
Brujos de Guayama	Guayama, Puerto Rico	Dr. Roque Nido Stella Coliseum	3,500
Caciques de Humacao	Humacao, Puerto Rico	Humacao Arena	8,000

== Regular season ==
=== League table ===
May 10, 2016

Team	W	L	PCT	GB	Home	Road
Vaqueros de Bayamón	21	15	0.583	0	15–3	6–12
Cangrejeros de Santurce	21	15	0.583	0	10–8	11–7
Capitanes de Arecibo	20	16	0.556	1	13–5	7–11
Santeros de Aguada	20	16	0.556	1	13–5	7–11
Caciques de Humacao	19	17	0.528	2	11–7	8–10
Leones de Ponce	18	18	0.500	3	12–6	6–12
Brujos de Guayama	18	18	0.500	3	15–3	3–15
Piratas de Quebradillas	18	18	0.500	3	11–7	7–11
Atléticos de San Germán	16	20	0.444	5	10–8	6–12
Atenienses de Manatí	15	21	0.417	6	11–7	4–14
Indios de Mayagüez	12	22	0.333	9	9–9	3–15

Green Qualified for the playoffs
Red Eliminated

== Playoffs ==
Quarterfinals
1	Vaqueros de Bayamón	4
8	Piratas de Quebradillas	1
4	Santeros de Aguada	4
5	Caciques de Humacao	2
2	Cangrejeros de Santurce	4
7	Brujos de Guayama	2
3	Capitanes de Arecibo	4
6	Leones de Ponce	0

Semifinals
1	Vaqueros de Bayamón	4
4	Santeros de Aguada	2
2	Cangrejeros de Santurce	1
3	Capitanes de Arecibo	4

Finals
1	Vaqueros de Bayamón	2
3	Capitanes de Arecibo	4

== Statistical leaders ==
=== Points ===
Rk	Name	Team	Games	Points	PPG
1	(United States) Damion James	Cangrejeros de Santurce	36	656	18.2
2	(United States) Brandon Costner	Caciques de Humacao	33	620	18.8
3	(United States) Chane Behanan	Santeros de Aguada	35	614	17.5
4	(Puerto Rico) Alex Galindo	Indios de Mayaguez	33	582	17.6
5	(Puerto Rico) Peter Ramos	Vaqueros de Bayamon	32	560	17.5

=== Rebounds ===
Rk	Name	Team	Games	Rebounds	RPG
1	(United States) Damion James	Cangrejeros de Santurce	36	396	11
2	(United States) Chane Behanan	Santeros de Aguada	35	336	9.6
3	(Nigeria) Jeleel Akindele	Vaqueros de Bayamon	36	320	8.9
4	(Egypt) Omar Samhan	Atleticos de San German	35	305	8.7
5	(Panama) Tony Bishop	Atleticos de San German	36	290	8.1

=== Assists ===
Rk	Name	Team	Games	Assists	APG
1	(Puerto Rico) Alex Abreu	Santeros de Aguada	33	254	7.7
2	(Puerto Rico) Filiberto Rivera	Indios de Mayaguez	32	243	7.6
3	(Puerto Rico) Guillermo Diaz	Capitanes de Arecibo	35	204	5.8
4	(Puerto Rico) Miguel Berdiel	Vaqueros de Bayamon	31	186	6
5	(Puerto Rico) Javier Gonzalez	Cangrejeros de Santurce	34	177	5.2

=== Blocks ===
Rk	Name	Team	Games	Blocks	BPG
1	(British Virgin Islands) Kleon Penn	Brujos de Guayama	35	67	1.9
2	(Egypt) Omar Samhan	Atleticos de San German	35	54	1.5
3	(Puerto Rico) Jorge Diaz	Piratas de Quebradillas	34	48	1.4
4	(United States) Damion James	Cangrejeros de Santurce	36	41	1.1
5	(Nigeria) Jeleel Akindele	Vaqueros de Bayamon	36	36	1

== Awards ==
=== Season Awards ===
- Most Valuable Player: (Puerto Rico) Ángel Daniel Vassallo, Leones de Ponce
- Rookie of the Year: (Cuba) Ismael Romero, Atléticos de San Germán
- Coach of the Year: (Puerto Rico) Allans Colón, Santeros de Aguada
- Sixth Man of the Year: (Puerto Rico) Mike Rosario, Cangrejeros de Santurce
