= 2011 BSN Finals =

Championship series

The 2011 BSN Finals was the championship series of the 2011 season of the Baloncesto Superior Nacional (BSN) and the conclusion of the season's playoffs. The champion Capitanes de Arecibo defeated the Piratas de Quebradillas, 4–1, to win their fifth BSN title.

The series was held from July to August 1, 2011. The Capitanes hosted Games 1, 3, and 5. Guillermo Diaz was named Most Valuable Player.

== Background ==
This was the Capitanes twelfth appearance in the BSN Finals, and the Piratas fourteenth. It was the first time each team faced each other in the Finals. The Capitanes had home-court advantage by virtue of a better regular-season record than the Piratas.

=== Road to the Finals ===
	W	L	PCT	GB	Home	Road
y-Vaqueros de Bayamón	21	9	.700	–	13–2	8–7
x-Capitanes de Arecibo	19	11	.633	2	13–2	6-9
x-Mets de Guaynabo	18	12	.600	3	14–1	4–11
x-Atléticos de San Germán	17	13	.567	4	13–2	4–11
x-Piratas de Quebradillas	16	14	.533	5	10–5	6–9
x-Cangrejeros de Santurce	15	15	.500	6	10–5	5–10
x-Maratonistas de Coamo	12	18	.400	9	10–5	2–13
x-Caciques de Humacao	12	18	.400	9	10–5	2–13
Gallitos de Isabela	10	20	.333	11	8–7	2–13
Indios de Mayagüez	10	20	.333	11	8–7	2–13

Capitanes de Arecibo		Piratas de Quebradillas
2nd best league record	Regular season	5th best league record
Defeated the (7) Maratonistas de Coamo, 4–0	Quarter Finals	Defeated the (4) Atléticos de San Germán, 4-2
Defeated the (3) Mets de Guaynabo, 4–1	Semifinals	Defeated the (1) Vaqueros de Bayamón, 4–2

== Series summary ==
Game	Date	Home team	Result	Road team
Game 1	July 24	Capitanes de Arecibo	89-81 (1–0)	Piratas de Quebradillas
Game 2	July 26	Piratas de Quebradillas	87-88 (0-2)	Capitanes de Arecibo
Game 3	July 28	Capitanes de Arecibo	73-79 (2-1)	Piratas de Quebradillas
Game 4	July 30	Piratas de Quebradillas	82–89 (1–3)	Capitanes de Arecibo
Game 5	August 1	Capitanes de Arecibo	79-74 (4–1)	Piratas de Quebradillas

=== Game 1 ===
Tele Isla

July 24
7:00 pm

Box score

Piratas de Quebradillas 81, Capitanes de Arecibo 89
Scoring by quarter: 20–22, 21–21, 21–15, 19–31
Pts: Peter John Ramos 24; Rebs: P. J. Tucker 16; Asts: P. J. Tucker 6	Pts: Larry Ayuso 33; Rebs: Ayuso, Pinnock 6 each Asts: Andrés Rodríguez 8
Arecibo leads series 1–0

Manuel Petaca Iguina Coliseum, Arecibo

=== Game 2 ===
Tele Isla

July 26
8:00 pm

Box score

Capitanes de Arecibo 88, Piratas de Quebradillas 87 (OT)
Scoring by quarter: 20–10, 12–12, 26–23, 22–35, Overtime: 8-7
Pts: Danilo Pinnock 26; Rebs: Guillermo Díaz 8 Asts: Andrés Rodríguez 11	Pts: P. J. Tucker 22; Rebs: Joel Jones 12; Asts: Darius Washington 6
Arecibo leads series 2-0

Raymond Dalmau Coliseum, Quebradillas

=== Game 3 ===
Tele Isla

July 28
8:00 pm

Box score

Piratas de Quebradillas 79, Capitanes de Arecibo 73
Scoring by quarter: 22–17, 10–24, 24–14, 23–18
Pts: Peter John Ramos 27; Rebs: Peter John Ramos 14; Asts: Darius Washington 5	Pts: Guillermo Díaz 21; Rebs: Andrés Rodríguez 11; Asts: Andrés Rodríguez 5
Arecibo leads series 2–1

Manuel Petaca Iguina Coliseum, Arecibo

The Capitanes dominated the first half of the game, 41-32, with a second quarter score of 27-10. Quebradillas, who had won the first quarter 22-17 only scored one field goal during the first 7:30 minutes of the second quarter. Arecibo had a 15-3 run and took the lead 32-25 during that time. There was also poor shooting efficacy in field goals, as both teams scored less than 42% of their shots during that half. The Piratas made a comeback in the third quarter with an 11-0 rally which closed the game to 44-43 with 5:52 to go. Six consecutive points from the Piratas allowed them to take the lead 52-46, while Arecibo suffered from foul trouble, particularly Danilo Pinnock, who already had three fouls. Quebradillas entered the last quarter with a 56-55 lead. In the last four minutes of the game, Peter John Ramos took control of the game for the Piratas, scoring five consecutive points, including a three-point play which gave his team a definitive lead of 72-71 with 1:50 to play. Ramos and P. J. Tucker scored two free throws each to seal the victory with 17 seconds. Quebradillas had a 10-2 run during the last minutes of the game, and Guillermo Díaz was the only Arecibo player to score during the last three minutes of the game, finishing with 21 points. Arecibo also relied too much on their three-point shooting, making only 9 of 31 attempts for a 29% average. Ramos finished the game with 27 points and 14 rebounds, while Darius Washington had 19 points, 9 rebounds, and 5 assists to lead Quebradillas.

=== Game 4 ===
Tele Isla

July 30
8:00 pm

Box score

Capitanes de Arecibo 89, Piratas de Quebradillas 82 (OT)
Scoring by quarter: 18-22, 20-23, 19–14, 17-15, Overtime: 15-8
Pts: Guillermo Díaz 29; Rebs: Jeffrion Aubry 10; Asts: Guillermo Díaz 5	Pts: Peter John Ramos 29; Rebs: P. J. Tucker 12; Asts: Darius Washington 10
Arecibo leads series 3-1

Raymond Dalmau Coliseum, Quebradillas
Attendance: 5,000+

The Piratas led the first half, 22-18, and closed the second quarter with a 7-0 rally after Daniel Santiago had two consecutive baskets in the paint. In the third quarter, Arecibo started to put pressure on defense and limited Quebradillas to only 14 points to close out their lead to 59-57 when entering the last quarter. During that third quarter, Quebradillas only scored four field goals, the last of them, a basket from Peter John Ramos, with 7:15 on the clock. They finished the quarter with six free throws to maintain their lead. With 1:23 to play in the fourth quarter, the Piratas widened their lead to 7 points, 73-66, after consecutive baskets from Joel Jones and Peter John Ramos. Arecibo responded with a basket from Guillermo Díaz with 0:44 seconds. Then Quebradillas' David Huertas missed a three-point shot which allowed Danilo Pinnock to score three points himself to close the gap to 74-71 with 0:21 seconds. In the next possession, Darius Washington received a foul, but missed one of his free-throws giving Arecibo a chance to tie it. After that, Pinnock received the ball alone and scored a three-pointer with 4.7 seconds on the clock, leading the game into overtime. During the overtime, Diaz and Larry Ayuso took control of the game for Arecibo, scoring the first 11 points of their team in the extra time, including three 3-pointers. Diaz and Ayuso finished the game with 29 and 26 points respectively. This was the second game of the Finals that went to overtime.

=== Game 5 ===
Tele Isla

August 1
8:00 pm

Box score

Piratas de Quebradillas 74, Capitanes de Arecibo 79
Scoring by quarter: 18-24, 16-18, 18-20, 22-17
Pts: David Huertas 26; Rebs: David Huertas 12; Asts: Peter John Ramos 5	Pts: Larry Ayuso 22; Rebs: Pinnock, Aubry 9 each Asts: Guillermo Díaz 4
Arecibo wins series 4–1

Manuel Petaca Iguina Coliseum, Arecibo

During the first quarter, Quebradillas' David Huertas scored 14 points, with 4 three-pointers. However, Arecibo played more aggressively and ended up leading the period 24-18, including a 9-0 rally. During the second quarter, Peter John Ramos joined Huertas as the scoring threats for the Piratas, finishing both with 26 points in the first half. However, it wasn't enough to take the lead and Arecibo finishes the half with a 43-42 lead, despite shooting 4-15 from the three-point line. Arecibo also leads in offensive rebounds 19-11. During the third quarter, the Piratas started with an erratic offensive, and their first basket came with 6:36 on the clock. However, they recovered and tried to take over with a 6-0 rally, but a technical foul from P. J. Tucker cut their momentum. Arecibo's Daniel Santiago also contributed with his defense, and several baskets, to help his team maintain the lead. The fourth quarter opened with four consecutive points from Arecibo. However, Quebradillas managed a rally of their own and closed the gap to 6 points, forcing the Capitanes to ask for a timeout. The Piratas won that quarter 22-17, but the Arecibo lead was already too much as they won the game by 5 points. Huertas and Ramos led the Piratas with 26 and 23 points respectively, while Larry Ayuso had 22 points for Arecibo.

== Awards ==
- 2011 BSN Champion: Capitanes de Arecibo
- Finals MVP: Guillermo Díaz

== Statistical leaders ==
Category	High			Average		
Category	Player	Team	Total	Player	Team	Avg.
Points	Larry Ayuso	Capitanes de Arecibo	33	Peter John Ramos	Piratas de Quebradillas	24.8
Rebounds	P. J. Tucker	Piratas de Quebradillas	16	P. J. Tucker	Piratas de Quebradillas	10.6
Assists	Andrés Rodríguez	Capitanes de Arecibo	11	Andrés Rodríguez	Capitanes de Arecibo	6.5
Steals	Danilo Pinnock	Capitanes de Arecibo	6	Larry Ayuso	Capitanes de Arecibo	2.0
Blocks	Jeffrion Aubry; Daniel Santiago	Capitanes de Arecibo	2	Jeffrion Aubry	Capitanes de Arecibo	1.4
