= 2017 Baloncesto Superior Nacional season =

Baloncesto Superior Nacional
- Season: 88th
- Teams: 10
- TV partners: WAPA 2 Deportes, DirecTV

Regular season
- Season MVP: (Puerto Rico) Gary Browne

Finals
- Champions: Piratas de Quebradillas
- Runners-up: Capitanes de Arecibo
- Semi-finalists: Capitanes de Arecibo
- Finals MVP: (United States) Tu Holloway

Statistical leaders
Points	(Dominican Republic) Víctor Liz	20.1
Rebounds	(United States) Eric Dawson	10.0
Assists	(Puerto Rico) Gary Browne	7.5
- All statistics correct as of June 17, 2016.

The 2017 Baloncesto Superior Nacional season was the 88th season of the Baloncesto Superior Nacional (BSN).

== League news ==
Piratas de Quebradillas claimed its 6th BSN championship on August 9. After defeating the Capitanes de Arecibo in Game 7 of the Serie Final 98–90 to the end of the 2017 season.

Leones de Ponce reported on August 24; Head coach Nelson Colón had resigned from his position as coach despite the team's absolute endorsement to continue. Throughout his 5 seasons, he led Ponce finishing among the best 4 records of the regular season in 4 of them, 3 finals, and 2 championships.

== Awards ==
=== Season Awards ===
On July 19, Gary Browne was named the league's Most Improved Player. Two weeks later, he was awarded the Most Valuable Player.

- Most Valuable Player: (United States) Gary Browne
- Rookie of the Year: (Puerto Rico)
- Coach of the Year: (Puerto Rico)
- Sixth Man of the Year: (Puerto Rico)
- Most Improved Player of the Year: (United States) Gary Browne

== Teams ==
=== 2017 teams ===
Locations of teams participating in 2017 BSN season

Team	Location	Arena	Capacity
Leones de Ponce	Ponce, Puerto Rico	Juan Pachín Vicéns Auditorium	8,000
Atléticos de San Germán	San Germán, Puerto Rico	Arquelio Torres Ramírez Coliseum	5,000
Vaqueros de Bayamón	Bayamón, Puerto Rico	Rubén Rodríguez Coliseum	12,000
Santeros de Aguada	Aguada, Puerto Rico	Ismael Delgado Coliseum	7,500
Piratas de Quebradillas	Quebradillas, Puerto Rico	Raymond Dalmau Coliseum	5,500
Capitanes de Arecibo	Arecibo, Puerto Rico	Manuel Iguina Coliseum	12,000
Indios de Mayagüez	Mayagüez, Puerto Rico	Palacio de Recreación y Deportes	5,500
Brujos de Guayama	Guayama, Puerto Rico	Dr. Roque Nido Stella Coliseum	3,500
Caciques de Humacao	Humacao, Puerto Rico	Humacao Arena	8,000
Cariduros de Fajardo	Fajardo, Puerto Rico	Tomás Dones Coliseum	8,000
