= Damion James =

American basketball player (born 1987)

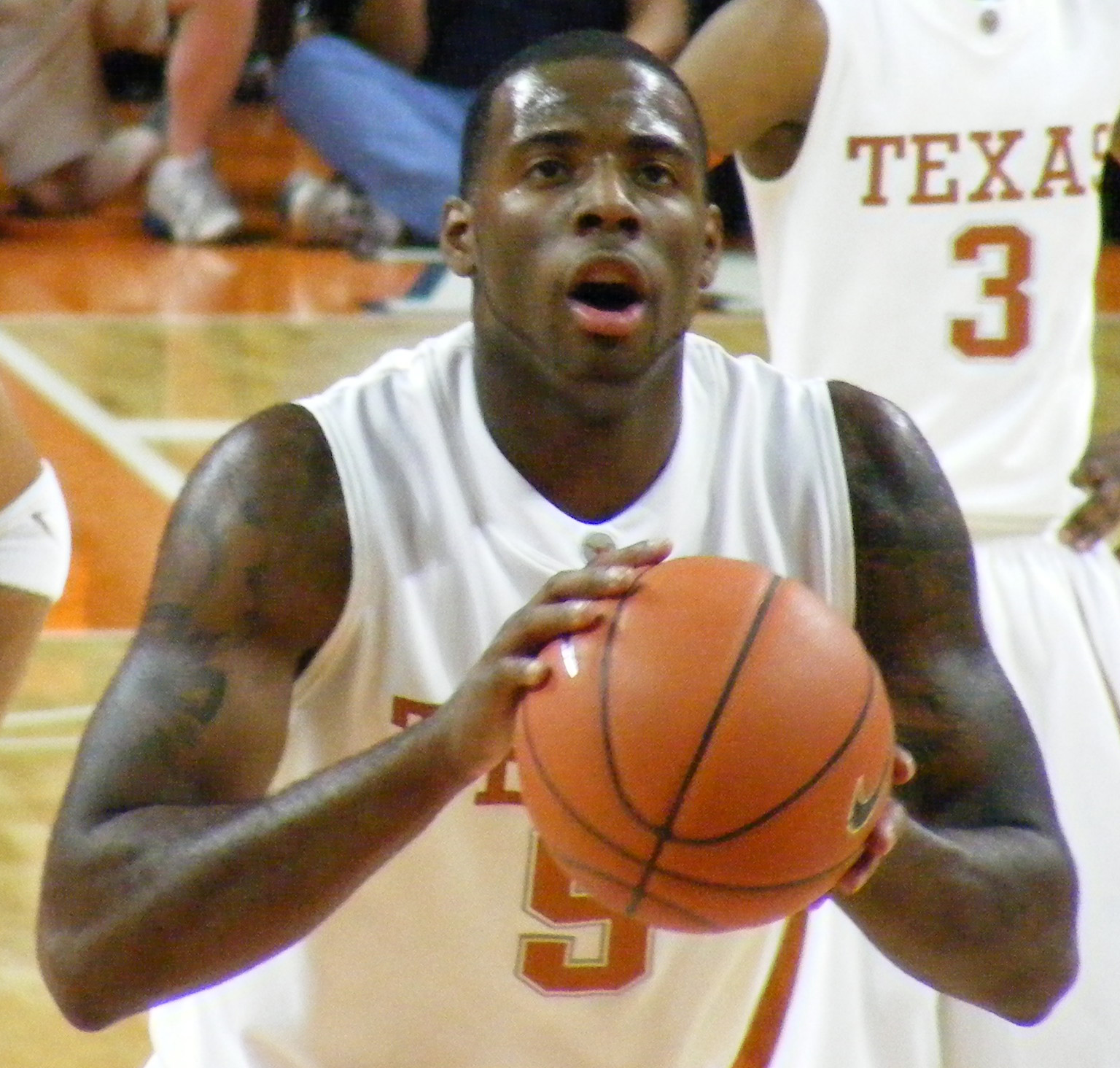
- James with the Texas Longhorns in 2008

Personal information
- Born: October 7, 1987 (age 39) Hobbs, New Mexico, U.S.
- Listed height: 6 ft 7 in (2.01 m)
- Listed weight: 225 lb (102 kg)

Career information
- High school: Nacogdoches (Nacogdoches, Texas)
- College: Texas (2006–2010)
- NBA draft: 2010: 1st round, 24th overall pick
- Drafted by: Atlanta Hawks
- Playing career: 2010–2018
- Position: Small forward
- Number: 10, 14, 7

Career history
- 2010–2012: New Jersey Nets
- 2012–2014: Bakersfield Jam
- 2013: Brooklyn Nets
- 2014–2015: Texas Legends
- 2014: San Antonio Spurs
- 2015: Alaska Aces
- 2015: Le Mans Sarthe Basket
- 2015: Sydney Kings
- 2016: Cangrejeros de Santurce
- 2016: Guaros de Lara
- 2017: Cariduros de Fajardo
- 2017: Hapoel Eilat
- 2018: Capitanes de Arecibo
- 2018: Cariduros de Fajardo
- 2018: Vaqueros de Bayamón

Career highlights
- NBA champion (2014); BSN champion (2018); BSN Foreign MVP (2016); BSN All-Star (2016); BSN All-Defensive Team (2016); FIBA Intercontinental Cup champion (2016); BSN scoring champion (2016); NBA D-League All-Star (2013); All-NBA D-League Second Team (2013); NBA D-League All-Defensive First Team (2013); Second-team All-American – TSN (2010); Third-team All-American – AP (2010); Second-team All-Big 12 (2009); Second-team Parade All-American (2006)
- Stats at NBA.com
- Stats at Basketball Reference

Damion Marquez Williams James (born October 7, 1987) is an American former professional basketball player who last played for Vaqueros de Bayamón of the Baloncesto Superior Nacional (BSN). He played college basketball for Texas.

== High school career ==
Considered a five-star recruit by Rivals.com, James was listed as the No. 7 small forward and the No. 17 player in the nation in 2006. He initially signed to play college basketball at the University of Oklahoma for head coach Kelvin Sampson. When Sampson took the head coaching position at Indiana University, the administration at Oklahoma released James from his letter of intent and he switched his decision to Texas.

== College career ==
=== Freshman season ===
James started all 35 games, along with fellow freshmen Kevin Durant and D. J. Augustin, in leading the Longhorns to a 25–10 record. James averaged 25.9 minutes per contest, with 7.6 points and 7.2 rebounds.

=== Sophomore season ===
James averaged 13.2 points and 10.3 rebounds, helping Texas win a share of the Big 12 regular season title. While talking about the Texas Longhorns on Selection Sunday, Dick Vitale said that James may be the most athletic player in all of college basketball. He also shot 43.6% from behind the arc.

=== Junior season ===
James, along with A. J. Abrams and Justin Mason, started all 35 games for the Texas Longhorns that went 23–12 and advanced to the second round of the 2009 NCAA Men's Division I Basketball Tournament. He averaged 15.4 points and 9.2 rebounds with double doubles in 16 of the games on his way to earning a spot on the All-Big 12 Conference Second Team. On April 15, 2009, James entered his name into the 2009 NBA draft, without hiring an agent, and thus retaining his NCAA eligibility. On June 13, 2009, it was reported that James pulled his name from the draft after not being guaranteed a first-round draft position.

=== Senior season ===
As a senior, James averaged 18.0 points, 10.3 rebounds, and one assist per game.

== Professional career ==
James was selected by the Atlanta Hawks with the 24th overall pick in the 2010 NBA draft. His rights were later traded to the New Jersey Nets for the rights of the 27th pick Jordan Crawford and 31st pick Tibor Pleiß. On July 15, 2010, he signed a multi-year deal with the Nets and subsequently joined them for the 2010 NBA Summer League. On December 9, 2010, James got his first career start against the Dallas Mavericks.

In January 2012, it was announced that James would miss the rest of the 2011–12 NBA season after undergoing surgery to replace the screw that had been inserted in the broken right foot he suffered the previous season.

On September 12, 2012, he signed with the Atlanta Hawks. However, he was later waived by the Hawks on October 27, 2012.

On November 1, 2012, James was acquired by the Bakersfield Jam of the NBA D-League.

On January 13, 2013, he signed a 10-day with the Brooklyn Nets. On January 23, 2013, he returned to the Jam.

On February 4, 2013, James was named to the Prospects All-Star roster for the 2013 NBA D-League All-Star Game.

In July 2013, James joined the Brooklyn Nets for the Orlando Summer League and the Miami Heat for the Las Vegas Summer League. On September 30, 2013, James signed with the Denver Nuggets. However, he was later waived by the Nuggets on October 26, 2013.

On December 5, 2013, James was reacquired by the Bakersfield Jam. On February 20, 2014, he was traded to the Texas Legends. On April 3, 2014, he signed a 10-day contract with the San Antonio Spurs. On April 13, 2014, he signed with the Spurs for the rest of the season. On June 15, 2014, he won his first NBA championship after the Spurs defeated the Miami Heat 4 games to 1 in the 2014 NBA Finals.

In July 2014, James joined the Detroit Pistons for the 2014 NBA Summer League. On September 29, 2014, he signed with the Washington Wizards. However, he was later waived by the Wizards on October 25, 2014. On November 3, 2014, he was reacquired by the Texas Legends. On February 17, 2015, he terminated his contract with the Legends. The next day, he signed with the Alaska Aces as an import for the 2015 PBA Commissioner's Cup.

On August 4, 2015, James signed a one-year deal with Le Mans Sarthe Basket of the LNB Pro A. On November 20, 2015, he parted ways with Le Mans after appearing in six league games and five Eurocup games. On December 9, 2015, he signed with the Sydney Kings as an injury replacement for Josh Childress. He was released on December 29 following the return of Childress. In five games for the Kings, James averaged 7.0 points and 7.8 rebounds per game. On January 26, 2016, he signed with the Cangrejeros de Santurce of Puerto Rico for the 2016 BSN season.

In August 2016, James signed with Guaros de Lara.

On November 4, 2017, James signed with the Israeli team Hapoel Eilat for the 2017–18 season, joining his former teammate Mike Rosario. However, on December 13, 2017, he was released by Eilat after appearing in four games. On December 31, he signed with Capitanes de Arecibo of Puerto Rico.

On May 17, 2018, James signed with Vaqueros de Bayamón of Puerto Rico after a two-game stint with Cariduros de Fajardo.

== NBA career statistics ==
Legend
GP	Games played	GS	Games started	MPG	Minutes per game
FG%	Field goal percentage	3P%	3-point field goal percentage	FT%	Free throw percentage
RPG	Rebounds per game	APG	Assists per game	SPG	Steals per game
BPG	Blocks per game	PPG	Points per game	**Bold**	Career high
†	Won an NBA championship

=== Regular season ===
Year	Team	GP	GS	MPG	FG%	3P%	FT%	RPG	APG	SPG	BPG	PPG
2010–11	New Jersey	**25**	**9**	16.1	**.447**	.000	.643	3.4	**.8**	.6	.5	4.4
2011–12	New Jersey	7	7	**24.3**	.371	.000	.667	**4.7**	.4	**1.0**	**1.0**	**4.9**
2012–13	Brooklyn	2	0	.0	—	—	—	.5	.0	.0	.0	.0
2013–14†	San Antonio	5	1	10.0	.222	.000	**1.000**	2.4	.6	.0	.2	1.2
Career		39	17	16.0	.415	.000	.667	3.4	.7	.6	.5	3.8

== See also ==
- 2006 high school boys basketball All-Americans
- 2010 NCAA Men's Basketball All-Americans
