= Guillermo Diaz (basketball) =

Puerto Rican basketball player (born 1985)

Guillermo Díaz
Personal information
- Born: March 4, 1985 (age 41) San Juan, Puerto Rico
- Listed height: 6 ft 2 in (1.88 m)
- Listed weight: 85 kg (187 lb)

Career information
- High school: Miami Christian (Miami, Florida)
- College: Miami (Florida) (2003–2006)
- NBA draft: 2006: 2nd round, 52nd overall pick
- Drafted by: Los Angeles Clippers
- Playing career: 2006–2024
- Position: Point guard

Career history
- 2006–2007: ČEZ Nymburk
- 2007: Olympiada Patras
- 2007–2008: Anaheim Arsenal
- 2008: Los Angeles Clippers
- 2008–2009: Juvecaserta
- 2009–2010: Biella
- 2010: Capitanes de Arecibo
- 2010–2011: Victoria Libertas Pesaro
- 2011: Capitanes de Arecibo
- 2011–2012: Armia Tbilisi
- 2012–2016: Capitanes de Arecibo
- 2016–2019: San Lorenzo
- 2019–2021: Atléticos de San Germán
- 2021: Real Estelí
- 2022: Cangrejeros de Santurce
- 2023: Gigantes de Carolina
- 2024: Capitanes de Arecibo

Career highlights
- 5× BSN champion (2010, 2011, 2016, 2018, 2023); BSN Finals MVP (2011); BSN All-Star (2016); 2× Second-team All-ACC (2005, 2006)
- Stats at NBA.com
- Stats at Basketball Reference
Medals
Men's basketball
Representing Puerto Rico
FIBA AmeriCup
Silver medal – second place	2009 San Juan
Centrobasket
Gold medal – first place	2016 Panama

Guillermo Díaz (born March 4, 1985) is a Puerto Rican former professional basketball player. Díaz was drafted by the Los Angeles Clippers of the National Basketball Association (NBA) in 2006, becoming the fifth Puerto Rican ever drafted by the NBA and the eighth to play in the league. He has also played professionally in Europe and spent the majority of his career in the Baloncesto Superior Nacional (BSN).

== Biography ==
=== University of Miami ===
Diaz had a stellar college career at the University of Miami, where he earned All-American status. At the University of Miami, he finished 10th on the school's all-time scoring list with 1,477 points, including 174 three-point field goals. He garnered All-Big East Team Freshman First Team honors in 2003–04 and led Miami in scoring as both a sophomore and a junior. He was named to the All-ACC Team in both his sophomore and junior years.

=== Los Angeles Clippers ===
Diaz declared his eligibility for the NBA draft following his junior year and was selected by the Los Angeles Clippers, with the 52nd overall selection in the 2006 NBA draft. During the summers of 2006 and 2007, Diaz participated with the team in the NBA Summer Pro League.

On August 16, 2007, Diaz signed a non-guaranteed contract with the Los Angeles Clippers to 3 years $2 million, according to HOOPSHYPE.com. On October 25, Diaz was released at the conclusion of preseason, signing a free agent contract with the Anaheim Arsenal of the NBDL. Through January 8, 2008, Diaz averaged 16.6 points per game in 14 games, with 7 starts.

On January 8, 2008, Diaz was signed to a 10-day contract with the Clippers, in which he debuted against the Phoenix Suns playing 5 minutes and registering 1 rebound. On January 18, the Clippers extended his contract for an additional 10 days. Through 6 games played in the NBA, Diaz scored 5 points, grabbed 2 rebounds, and dished 1 assist in 18 minutes played. The contract was terminated on January 28, when the team decided not to offer a guaranteed contract for the remainder of the season.

=== NBA Summer League 2008 ===
Guillermo Diaz was included on the Summer League roster of the Charlotte Bobcats for the NBA Summer League 2008.

=== Overseas career ===
For the 2006–07 season he played for ČEZ Basketball Nymburk in the Czech basketball league. On January 7, 2007, El Nuevo Dia reported that Diaz would not return for the second half of the season, as stated by mentor Arturo Alvarez, as Diaz wasn't able to adapt to the different lifestyle that he experienced in the Czech Republic. By the time that Diaz decided to leave the Czech league, he was the second leading scorer in the whole league, with an average of 20.1 points per game, and had led Nymburk to a 15–1 season start in the Czech League.

Diaz also played in five games with AEP Olimpiada Patron in the Greek League in 2007, tallying 13.0 points per game.

In February 2008, he signed for Pepsi Caserta, a team in the LegADue, now known as Serie A2 Basket, the second division of Italian professional basketball. He helped them win the championship in the 2008 season. For winning they were promoted to the Italian top-tier level LBA in the 2008–09 season.

=== Controversy with National Superior Basketball ===
After his departing from the Czech national league, Diaz announced that he was interested in including his name to the list of players in the Puerto Rican BSN draft. He was involved in a movement that was trying to convince the team owners of the league to avoid the implementation of a salary cap to first-year players.

However, the team owners decided to put in cap on salary of twenty five thousand dollars, which led Diaz to remove his name from the list of players. This led former owner Miguel Mercado to create a movement inciting first-year players to withdraw their names from the draft; the controversy reached a conclusion, when Mercado and the league reached an agreement. Diaz announced that he was going to skip participation in any league, and continued his participation in the Clippers Summer League team.

=== Real Estelí ===
Diaz played with Nicaraguan club Real Estelí in the 2021–22 BCL Americas.

== Career stats ==
Legend
GP	Games played	GS	Games started	MPG	Minutes per game
FG%	Field goal percentage	3P%	3-point field goal percentage	FT%	Free throw percentage
RPG	Rebounds per game	APG	Assists per game	SPG	Steals per game
BPG	Blocks per game	PPG	Points per game	**Bold**	Career high

=== Domestic leagues ===
Season	Team	League	GP	MPG	FG%	3P%	FT%	RPG	APG	SPG	BPG	PPG
2006–07	ČEZ Basketball Nymburk	Czech NBL	15	32.5	.620	.411	.897	3.1	3.3	2.5	.1	20.1
2006–07	Olympias Patras B.C.	Greek A1	5	24.2	.484	.462	.739	1.4	1.2	.6	.0	13.0
2007–08	Anaheim Angels	D-League	21	34.9	.484	.333	.844	4.0	3.1	1.0	.1	18.4
2008–09	Eldo Caserta	Legadue	25	33.3	.552	.411	.767	3.4	2.0	1.4	.0	16.7
2009–10	Angelico Biella	Lega A	3	27.3	.333	.250	.750	1.7	2.0	1.0	.0	7.7
2010	Capitanes de Arecibo	BSN	13	22.0	.543	.474	.791	2.8	2.7	.7	.2	13.5
2010–11	Victoria Libertas Pesaro	Lega A	24	28.3	.547	.364	.806	2.7	1.3	1.3	.0	12.5
2011	Capitanes de Arecibo	BSN	25	28.5	.583	.352	.709	3.7	3.8	1.0	.0	12.8
2011–12	BC Armia	Georgian Superliga	24	26.1	.534	.316	.820	3.2	2.6	1.5	.3	12.4
2012	Capitanes de Arecibo	BSN	8	26.3	.409	.280	.731	3.0	3.3	.8	.1	9.5
2013	Capitanes de Arecibo	BSN	18	29.1	.617	.245	.686	3.9	3.9	1.4	.3	11.3
2014	Capitanes de Arecibo	BSN	49	32.0	.579	.257	.762	3.9	2.7	.8	.3	10.6
2015	Capitanes de Arecibo	BSN	37	25.5	.565	.330	.794	2.5	2.5	.8	.1	8.7

=== NBA ===
==== Regular season ====
Year	Team	GP	GS	MPG	FG%	3P%	FT%	RPG	APG	SPG	BPG	PPG
2007–08	L.A. Clippers	6	0	3.0	.250	.000	.600	.3	.2	.0	.0	.8

- NCAA Division I: 93 games, 1477 points (15.9 PPG), 238 assists (2.6), 313 rebounds (3.4), 123 steals (1.3), .448 field goal percentage, .740 free-throw, and .380 3-point.

== See also ==
- List of Puerto Ricans
