= Allans Colón =

Puerto Rican basketball player

Personal information
- Born: January 17, 1974 (age 52) Ponce, Puerto Rico
- Position: Head coach
- Coaching career: 1997–present

Career history

Coaching
- 1997–2001: Criollos de Caguas (Assistant)
- 2002–2004: Leones de Ponce (Assistant)
- 2005–2006: Capitanes de Arecibo (Assistant)
- 2014–2015: Puerto Rico (Assistant coach)
- 2014–2015: Santeros de Aguada
- 2016–2017: Panteras de Aguascalientes
- 2016–2017: Cariduros de Fajardo
- 2018–2020: Brujos de Guayama
- 2019–2020: Mineros de Zacatecas
- 2021–2022: Piratas de Quebradillas
- 2022: Halcones de Xalapa
- 2023: Cangrejeros de Santurce
- 2024: Lobos Plateados de la BUAP
- 2025: Capitanes de Arecibo
- 2025: Gambusinos de Fresnillo

Allans Colón (born January 17, 1974) is a Puerto Rican basketball coach.

== Coaching career ==
He has been the head coach of different teams from the BSN, such as Santeros de Aguada, Cariduros de Fajardo, Brujos de Guayama, Piratas de Quebradillas, Cangrejeros de Santurce and Capitanes de Arecibo.

He has also coached several teams of the Mexican Professional Basketball League, such as Panteras de Aguascalientes, Mineros de Zacatecas, Halcones de Xalapa, Lobos Plateados de la BUAP and Gambusinos de Fresnillo.

As the assistant head coach of Puerto Rico from 2014 to 2015, he helped the team obtain th fifth lace at the 2015 FIBA Americas Championship.
