= Manny Camper =

American basketball player

No. 8 – Santeros de Aguada
- Position: Shooting guard / small forward
- League: Baloncesto Superior Nacional

Personal information
- Born: May 18, 1999 (age 27) Chestertown, Maryland, U.S.
- Listed height: 6 ft 7 in (2.01 m)
- Listed weight: 205 lb (93 kg)

Career information
- High school: Kent County (Chestertown, Maryland)
- College: Siena (2017–2021)
- NBA draft: 2021: undrafted
- Playing career: 2021–present

Career history
- 2021–2022: Grand Rapids Gold
- 2022: Cariduros de Fajardo
- 2022–2023: Grand Rapids Gold
- 2023: Cariduros de Fajardo
- 2023–2024: Sioux Falls Skyforce
- 2024–present: Santeros de Aguada
- 2025: Paisas

Career highlights
- MAAC Player of the Year (2021); 2× First-team All-MAAC (2020, 2021)

Manuel Camper (born May 18, 1999) is an American professional basketball player for Santeros de Aguada of the Baloncesto Superior Nacional (BSN). He played college basketball for the Siena Saints.

== High school career ==
Camper attended Kent County High School, where he played quarterback and wide receiver as well as basketball. He scored 1,951 points in his high school career. As a senior, Camper averaged 28 points and 13 rebounds per game and led the Trojans to the Maryland 1A east region title. He was twice named Bayside North Player of the Year.

== College career ==
Camper rarely played as a freshman and averaged 6.4 points and 5.4 rebounds per game as a sophomore. He spent the offseason reworking his shot. He averaged 13.7 points and 10.4 rebounds per game as a junior. Camper was named to the First Team All-MAAC. Following the season, he declared for the 2020 NBA draft but opted to return. He earned MAAC Player of the Week honors on January 11, 2021, and March 1, 2021. At the close of the 2020–21 regular season, Camper was named the MAAC Player of the Year. He averaged 14.1 points, 9.7 rebounds and 3.6 assists per game. Following the season, Camper declared for the 2021 NBA draft, forgoing the additional year of eligibility the NCAA granted players due to the COVID-19 pandemic.

== Professional career ==
=== Grand Rapids Gold (2021–2022) ===
After going undrafted in the 2021 NBA draft Camper joined the Grand Rapids Gold after a successful tryout in October 2021.

=== Cariduros de Fajardo (2022) ===
On April 12, 2022, Camper signed with the Cariduros de Fajardo of the BSN.

=== Return to Grand Rapids (2022–2023) ===
On November 4, 2022, Camper was named to the opening night roster for the Grand Rapids Gold.

=== Return to Fajardo (2023) ===
After the G League season ended, Camper returned with Cariduros de Fajardo.

=== Sioux Falls Skyforce (2023–2024) ===
On October 30, 2023, Camper joined the Sioux Falls Skyforce, but was waived on November 6. Nine days later, he re-joined the Skyforce.

=== Santeros de Aguada (2024–present) ===
On January 24, 2024, Camper signed with the Santeros de Aguada ahead of the 2024 BSN season.

== Career statistics ==
Legend
| GP | Games played | GS | Games started | MPG | Minutes per game |
| FG% | Field goal percentage | 3P% | 3-point field goal percentage | FT% | Free throw percentage |
| RPG | Rebounds per game | APG | Assists per game | SPG | Steals per game |
| BPG | Blocks per game | PPG | Points per game | **Bold** | Career high |

=== College ===
| Year | Team | GP | GS | MPG | FG% | 3P% | FT% | RPG | APG | SPG | BPG | PPG |
|---|---|---|---|---|---|---|---|---|---|---|---|---|
| 2017–18 | Siena | 16 | 2 | 6.8 | **.588** | **.500** | .611 | 1.2 | .1 | .3 | .1 | 2.0 |
| 2018–19 | Siena | 29 | 22 | 26.1 | .486 | .133 | .522 | 5.4 | 1.3 | .8 | **.3** | 6.4 |
| 2019–20 | Siena | **30** | **30** | 36.1 | .480 | .333 | **.654** | **10.4** | 2.4 | .9 | **.3** | 13.7 |
| 2020–21 | Siena | 17 | 17 | **37.9** | .395 | .304 | .582 | 9.7 | **3.6** | **1.2** | .2 | **14.1** |
| Career | | 92 | 71 | 28.2 | .457 | .276 | .604 | 7.1 | 1.9 | .8 | .3 | 9.4 |
