= Jonathan Rodríguez (basketball) =

Puerto Rican basketball player (born 1987)

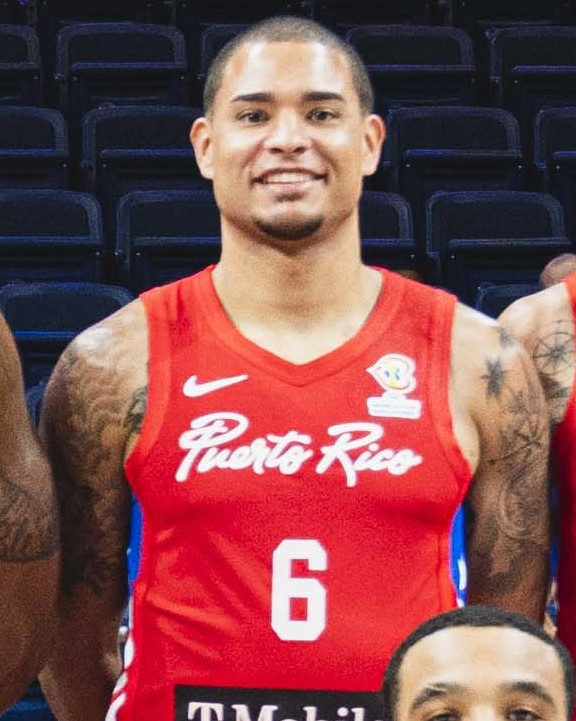
- Rodríguez with the Puerto Rican national team in 2022

No. 24 – Osos de Manatí
- Position: Shooting guard / small forward
- League: Baloncesto Superior Nacional

Personal information
- Born: November 3, 1987 (age 39) Bayamón, Puerto Rico
- Listed height: 6 ft 5 in (1.96 m)
- Listed weight: 200 lb (91 kg)

Career information
- High school: Calusa Preparatory (Miami, Florida)
- College: Campbell (2006–2010)
- NBA draft: 2010: undrafted
- Playing career: 2010–present

Career history
- 2010–2011: Leones de Ponce
- 2011: Gallitos de Isabela
- 2011–12: Cangrejeros de Santurce
- 2012–2013: Santeros de Aguada
- 2013–2014: Libertadores de Querétaro
- 2014–2015: Comunicaciones
- 2015–2016: Santeros de Aguada
- 2016–2017: Mineros de Zacatecas
- 2017–2018: Santeros de Aguada
- 2018–2019: Libertadores de Querétaro
- 2019–2020: Santeros de Aguada
- 2020–2021: Cariduros de Fajardo
- 2021: Titanes de Barranquilla
- 2021–2024: Capitanes de Arecibo
- 2025–present: Osos de Manatí

Career highlights
- BSN champion (2019, 2021); 2× BSN Three-Point Contest champion (2021); 3× First-team All-Atlantic Sun (2007, 2008, 2010); Second-team All-Atlantic Sun (2009)

Jonathan John Rodríguez (born November 3, 1987) is a Puerto Rican basketball player for Osos de Manatí of the Baloncesto Superior Nacional (BSN) in Puerto Rico. He played college basketball for Campbell University in the ASUN Conference of the National Collegiate Athletic Association.

== Biography ==
Rodríguez had a stellar high school career at Calusa Preparatory, where he led the team to Florida’s state championship in 2005. He had an average of 25.5 points per game and was selected as Florida’s Player of the Year in Class 1-A, Miami Herald 3A-1A Player of the Year.

Rodríguez would begin his college basketball career with Campbell in 2006. He debuted as a starting forward. He had a notable rookie year being ranked among the Atlantic Sun Conference’s leaders in several statistical categories; he led the conference with 8.8 rebounds per game and finished third in the conference with 17.3 points per game. Rodríguez was Campbell's first freshman to earn all-conference honors since Joe Spinks gained second team All-Big South recognition in 1991. He was the only freshman player in school Division I history to gain first-team all-league recognition. He compiled 12 double-doubles in 31 games and scored in double figures in 28 of 31 games played, in eleven occasions breaking the twenty point mark. He tied the school’s points record by for a freshman with 30 points against Stetson as well as the free throw percentage mark with a 10 out of ten performance on the same game.

Following his sophomore year Rodríguez received several honors, these included being selected first-team all-state by the North Carolina Collegiate Sports Information Association. Several specialized websites awarded him recognitions including CollegeHoops.net and CollegeInsider.com who named him an honorable mention Mid-Major All-American. MidMajority.com considered him the Atlantic Sun Conference's player of the year. He was also selected as a first-team all-conference player by the A-Sun's coaches. Rodríguez finished his second college year in twenty-second and twentieth places in the NCAA in scoring and rebounds, with 20.9 points and 10.1 rebounds per game. He became the second player in Campbell's history to score more than 600 points in a season, finishing with a total of 626 and became the fastest player to pass the 1,000 points mark. Rodríguez scored in double figures in thirty-eight consecutive games and scored twenty points and ten rebounds in twelve games. Among A-Sun players, he finished second in offensive and defensive rebounds. On May 10, 2008, he participated in a special event organized by the National Superior Basketball (BSN) league, where a team of college students competed against a team of young BSN players. In this game he played 11:35 minutes and scored five rebounds and one assist.

== See also ==
- List of NCAA Division I men's basketball players with 2000 points and 1000 rebounds
