= Jose Abreu (basketball) =

Puerto Rican basketball player (1974-1996)

José Abreu
- Born: 20 May, 1974; Isabela, Puerto Rico
- Died: 1996 (age 22)
- Occupation: Professional basketball player
- Years active: 1991–1996

Jose "Buga" Abreu Mendez (20 May 1974–1996) was a Puerto Rican professional basketball player for the BSN league.

In five seasons of play, Abreu Mendez played for the Gallitos de Isabela, Atleticos de San German and Tiburones de Aguadilla franchises.

== Career ==
Abreu Mendez enjoyed a brief but productive career at the BSN. In 1991, at the age of 17, he was hired by the Gallitos. He played 7 games, scoring 6 points, with 3 rebounds and no assists, for averages of 0.9, 0.4 and 0.0 per game, on 5 shots taken, of which he made 2, and 4 free throws taken, of which he made 2. He did not take a three-point shot.

His second season, he played in five games for the Gallitos, scoring 19 points, with 12 rebounds and 1 assist, for averages of 3.8, 2.4 and 0.2, respectively, having taken 19 shots of which he made 8, with one missed three point shot and going 3 for 8 from the free throw line. Abreu took one year off in 1993, then returned in 1994, signed by the Atleticos of the southwestern Puerto Rican city of San German, which gave him the opportunity to be teammates with Jose "Piculin" Ortiz, widely considered among the greatest basketball players in BSN history. Abreu played 8 games with the Atleticos, scoring 16 points, with 10 rebounds and 0 assists, for averages of 2.0 points, 1.3 rebounds and 0 assists per game. The Atleticos won the BSN championship that year. Before the 1995 season arrived, Abreu was traded to the Aguadilla Sharks in the northwestern Puerto Rican city of Aguadilla, where he saw action in 14 games (over-passing the 10 games played mark for the first time in his career), scoring 13 points, with 18 rebounds and 1 assist, for averages of 0.9, 1.3 and 0.1 in those statistical categories.

1996 was Abreu's final year in the BSN, as his career was cut short by tragedy. He returned to the Isabela Gallitos that year and had a surge in every statistical category, as he scored 127 points, grabbed 70 rebounds and recorded 9 assists in just 11 games, for averages of 11.5, 6.4 and 0.8.

== Career resume ==
Abreu Mendez played 45 games in 5 BSN seasons for three teams. He scored 181 points for an average of 4.0, with 113 rebounds for an average of 2.5 a game, and 11 assists, for an average of 0.2 per game. He won one BSN championship, with the Atleticos in 1994.

== Death ==
Abreu and fellow Gallitos player Hector Ortiz were returning from an away game against the Criollos de Caguas to Isabela when their car crashed, causing their deaths.

== Honors ==
The José Abreu Coliseum in Isabela is named after him. An original coliseum that was named after him was demolished in 2018 and a new one opened in 2022.

== See also ==
- List of Puerto Ricans
