= Alex Abreu =

Puerto Rican basketball player

No. 21 – Osos de Manatí
- Position: Point guard
- League: BSN

Personal information
- Born: August 14, 1991 (age 35) New York City, New York, U.S.
- Listed height: 5 ft 11 in (1.80 m)
- Listed weight: 175 lb (79 kg)

Career information
- High school: Bayamón Military Academy (Bayamón, Puerto Rico)
- College: Akron (2010–2013); West Georgia (2014–2015)
- NBA draft: 2015: undrafted
- Playing career: 2015–present

Career history
- 2015: Maratonistas de Coamo
- 2015–2016: Santeros de Aguada
- 2016–2017: Panteras de Aguascalientes
- 2017: Guaros de Lara
- 2017–2018: Orléans Loiret Basket
- 2018–2019: Champagne Châlons-Reims
- 2019–2020: Santeros de Aguada
- 2020–2021: Cangrejeros de Santurce
- 2021–2022: Cariduros de Fajardo
- 2022–2023: Aix Maurienne Savoie Basket
- 2023–2024: Cariduros de Fajardo
- 2024: Santeros de Aguada
- 2025: Vaqueros de Bayamón
- 2026–present: Osos de Manatí

Career highlights
- FIBA Americas League champion (2017); 2x BSN champion (2019, 2025); BSN Most Improved Player (2016); BSN assists leader (2016); LNB champion (2016); Second-team All-MAC (2012)
Medals
Men's basketball
Representing Puerto Rico
Centrobasket
Gold medal – first place	2016 Panama

Alexander Abreu Vázquez (born August 14, 1991) is a Puerto Rican professional basketball player for the Osos de Manatí of the Baloncesto Superior Nacional (BSN). He formerly played college basketball in Akron and West Georgia, and also in the French LNB Pro A. Standing at a height of 5 ft 11 in (1.80 m), he plays at the point guard position. Internationally, Abreu represents and plays for the Puerto Rican national team.

== College career ==
Abreu played for The University of Akron, which was on track for one of the best seasons in program history. After having drugs shipped in from Puerto Rico, he was arrested and the team was quickly eliminated from the NCAA tournament in the round of 64.

== Professional career ==
=== Orléans Loiret Basket ===
On June 16, 2017, Abreu signed a one-year deal with Orléans Loiret Basket of the LNB Pro B.

=== Santeros de Aguada ===
Abreu won a championship with the Santeros de Aguada in 2019.

=== Cariduros de Fajardo ===
Abreu currently plays with the Cariduros de Fajardo of the BSN. After los Santeros de Aguada moved their franchise to the city of Fajardo.

== National team career ==
Abreu represented Puerto Rico at the 2016 Centrobasket where he won a gold medal. Abreu also played at the 2017 FIBA AmeriCup where he averaged 4.7 points, 2.7 rebounds and 4.3 assists per game in two games.
