= Javier González (basketball) =

Puerto Rican basketball player

No. 2 – Vaqueros de Bayamón
- Position: Guard
- League: Baloncesto Superior Nacional

Personal information
- Born: April 15, 1989 (age 37) Carolina, Puerto Rico
- Listed height: 6 ft 1 in (1.85 m)
- Listed weight: 187 lb (85 kg)

Career information
- High school: Dr. Michael M. Krop (Miami, Florida)
- College: NC State (2007–2011)
- NBA draft: 2011: undrafted
- Playing career: 2011–present

Career history
- 2010–2011: Hod HaSharon
- 2011–2012: Caciques de Humacao
- 2012: Cangrejeros de Santurce
- 2012–2013: Kolín
- 2013: Melilla Baloncesto
- 2013–2016: Cangrejeros de Santurce
- 2016–2017: Vaqueros de Bayamón
- 2016–2017: Iskra Svit
- 2018: Aguacateros de Michoacán
- 2019–2021: Brujos de Guayama
- 2021–present: Vaqueros de Bayamón

Career highlights
- 2× BSN Champion (2021, 2022); BSN Rookie of the Year (2013); BSN Most Improved Player (2013)

Javier Eduardo González Vejar (born April 15, 1989) is a Puerto Rican professional basketball player for the Vaqueros de Bayamón of the Baloncesto Superior Nacional (BSN).

== High school ==
González played for coach Marcos Rodriguez at Miami's Dr. Michael M. Krop High School in Miami, Florida. He averaged 20.7 points, 7.3 rebounds and 5.0 assists as a senior. González was tabbed the Class 6-A Florida Player of the Year, First-team all-state and All-Dade County, Miami-Dade County Co-Player of the Year, Miami Herald's Player of the Year, Team reached the 6-A state quarterfinals, and finished 28-4. Earned Co-MVP honors at Florida's 2007 Senior Showcase. Led the East squad with 15 points and four assists in 18 minutes of action. Also finished second in the Three-Point Shootout. MVP of the Dade-Broward All-Star game, scoring all 12 points in the second half, 12 of the team's final 16 points for the win. Played his first two years of high school basketball at St. Patrick's in New Jersey. Named second-team all-state as a sophomore. Rated as a three-star prospect and the No. 14 player in Florida by rivals.com.

== NC State ==
Javi Gonzalez played college basketball for the NC State Wolfpack in the Atlantic Coast Conference. Gonzalez was a 4 year starter for the Pack and became a fan favorite due to his grit and fiery play on the court. Under head coach Sidney Lowe, Gonzalez averaged 6.4 points and 2.8 assists per game and shot 34.3% from three point range.

In 2009, Gonzalez hit a 3-pointer against #7 Duke with 1 second on the shot clock that clinched the win for the Wolfpack. In 2010, he scored a record-breaking 10 points in 23.3 seconds against Arizona.

== Professional career ==
On 9 September 2012, González signed with Kolín of the Czech NBL.

== National team career ==
González was selected for Puerto Rico men's national basketball team in 2014 and 2015. He participated in two FIBA tournaments representing Puerto Rico. He played at the 2015 FIBA Americas Championship, where he averaged 7.0 points and 4.3 rebounds in four games. Additionally, he played at the Marchand Continental Championship Cup, where he averaged 7.7 points over three games.

== National Guard ==
Javier González enlisted in the Puerto Rico Army National Guard on August 31, 2026.
