= John Holland (basketball) =

American Puerto Rican basketball player (born 1988)

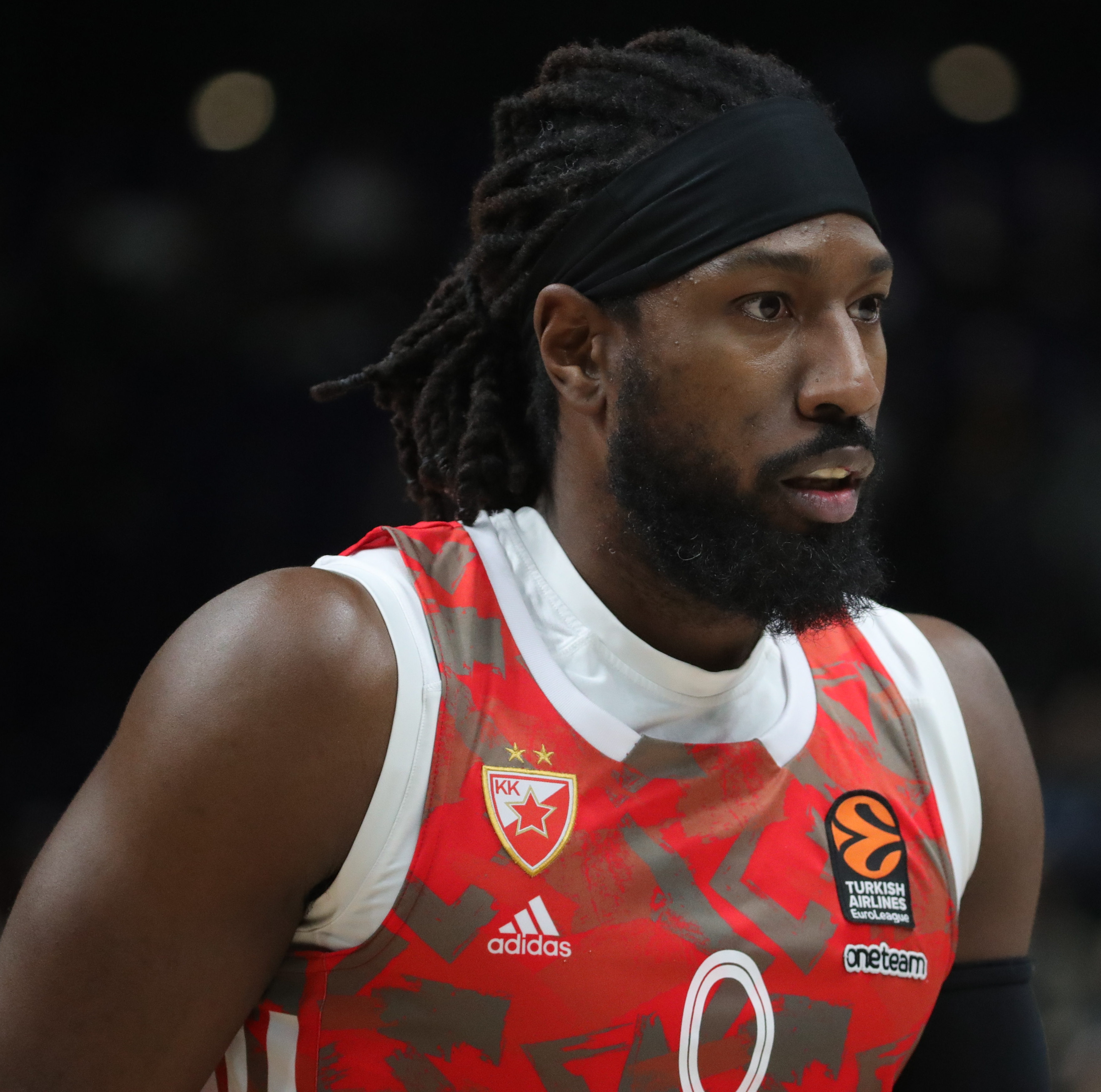
- Holland with the Crvena zvezda in 2022

No. 23 – Santeros de Aguada
- Position: Small forward
- League: Baloncesto Superior Nacional

Personal information
- Born: November 6, 1988 (age 38) The Bronx, New York, U.S.
- Listed height: 6 ft 5 in (1.96 m)
- Listed weight: 205 lb (93 kg)

Career information
- High school: Fordham Prep (The Bronx, New York); Saint Benedict's Prep (Newark, New Jersey)
- College: Boston University (2007–2011)
- NBA draft: 2011: undrafted
- Playing career: 2011–present

Career history
- 2011–2012: Chorale Roanne
- 2012–2013: Cajasol Sevilla
- 2013–2014: BCM Gravelines
- 2014–2015: Beşiktaş
- 2015–2016: Canton Charge
- 2016: Boston Celtics
- 2016–2017: Canton Charge
- 2017–2018: Cleveland Cavaliers
- 2017–2018: →Canton Charge
- 2018–2019: Austin Spurs
- 2019: Santeros de Aguada
- 2019: San Miguel Beermen
- 2019–2020: Hapoel Jerusalem
- 2020: UNICS Kazan
- 2021: Cariduros de Fajardo
- 2022: UNICS Kazan
- 2022: Frutti Extra Bursaspor
- 2022: Cariduros de Fajardo
- 2022–2023: Crvena zvezda
- 2023–2024: Hapoel Tel Aviv
- 2025–present: Santeros de Aguada

Career highlights
- Israeli State Cup winner (2020); NBA D-League Impact Player of the Year (2017); All-NBA D-League Third Team (2017); BSN champion (2019); LNB Pro A All-Star (2012); America East Player of the Year (2011); 3× First-team All-America East (2009–2011); Third-team All-America East (2008); America East Freshman of the Year (2008); America East All-Freshman Team (2008); America East All-Defensive Team (2008); America East tournament MVP (2011)
- Stats at NBA.com
- Stats at Basketball Reference
Medals
Men's basketball
Representing Puerto Rico
FIBA AmeriCup
Silver medal – second place	2013 Venezuela

John Michael Joseph Holland (born November 6, 1988) is an American-Puerto Rican professional basketball player for Santeros de Aguada of the Baloncesto Superior Nacional (BSN). A small forward, he played college basketball for the Boston Terriers and represents the Puerto Rican national team.

== High school career ==
Holland attended Fordham Prep where he averaged 16 points, eight rebounds, eight assists and three steals, earning a McDonald's All-American nomination, a CHSAA All-Division naming and All-County honors from the Journal News. He also played for Saint Benedict's Prep where he averaged 10 points, six rebounds, six assists, three steals and two blocks per game.

== College career ==
Holland played college basketball for Boston University where as a junior in 2009–10, he led the America East Conference in scoring with 19.2 points per game. He repeated as scoring champion in 2010–11 after again averaging 19.2 points. He was subsequently named America East Conference Men's Basketball Player of the Year and led the Terriers to an NCAA Tournament berth.

== Professional career ==
=== European career (2011–2015) ===
Holland went undrafted in the 2011 NBA draft. On July 5, 2011, he signed with Chorale Roanne Basket of France for the 2011–12 season. In 28 games, he averaged 14.3 points, 4.7 rebounds and 1.8 assists per game.

In July 2012, Holland joined the Oklahoma City Thunder for the Orlando Summer League and the Miami Heat for the Las Vegas Summer League. On August 5, 2012, he signed with Cajasol Sevilla of Spain for the 2012–13 season. In 33 Liga ACB games, he averaged 10.4 points, 2.8 rebounds, 1.4 assists and 0.7 steals per game and in 12 Eurocup games, he averaged 10.1 points, 1.9 rebounds, 2.5 assists and 1.0 steals.

In July 2013, Holland joined the Minnesota Timberwolves for the 2013 NBA Summer League. On October 29, 2013, he signed with BCM Gravelines of France for the 2013–14 season. He played in 23 Pro A games averaging 10.9 points, 3.2 rebounds and 1.3 assists in 26.3 minutes and also appeared in 13 Eurocup games, averaging 9.9 points, 3.7 rebounds and 1.5 assists in 29.5 minutes.

On September 26, 2014, Holland signed with the San Antonio Spurs. However, he was later waived by the Spurs on October 13. The next day, he signed with Beşiktaş of Turkey for the 2014–15 season. In 15 Eurocup games, he averaged 8.7 points, 2.8 rebounds, 1.3 assists and 0.6 steals.

=== Canton Charge (2015–2016) ===
On December 23, 2015, Holland was acquired by the Canton Charge of the NBA Development League. He made his debut for the Charge later that night against the Grand Rapids Drive, recording 11 points, 3 rebounds, 5 assists and 2 steals in a 113–111 loss. In 37 games with the Charge, he averaged 16.0 points, 3.1 rebounds, 2.0 assists and 1.2 steals in 30.2 minutes per game.

=== Boston Celtics (2016) ===
On April 11, 2016, Holland signed with the Boston Celtics. On April 19, he made his debut for the Celtics in an 89–72 playoff loss to the Atlanta Hawks, playing one minute off the bench. On August 31, 2016, he was waived by the Celtics.

On September 26, 2016, Holland signed with the Cleveland Cavaliers, but was waived on October 22 after appearing in three preseason games.

=== Return to Canton (2016–2017) ===
On December 9, 2016, Holland was reacquired by the Canton Charge. At the end of the season, he was named the D-League's Impact Player of the Year.

After the end of the 2016-17 NBA Development League season, Holland signed with the Beijing Eastern Bucks of the Chinese National Basketball League. However, he left the Beijing before appearing in a single game for them.

=== Cleveland Cavaliers (2017–2018) ===
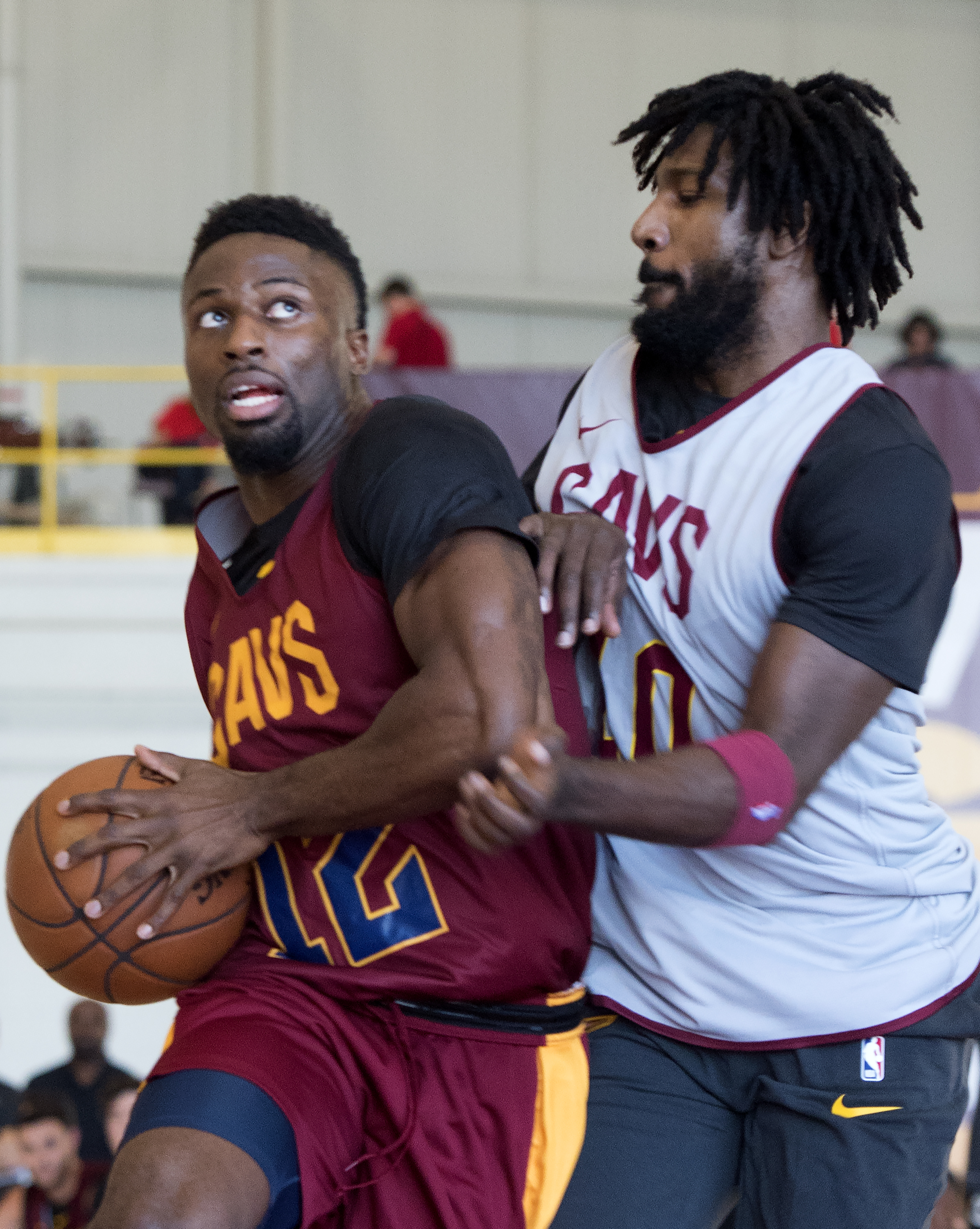
Holland (right) guards Cavaliers teammate David Nwaba during a scrimmage in 2018

On September 8, 2017, Holland was signed to a two-way contract by the Cleveland Cavaliers of the NBA. Under the terms of the deal, he will split time between the Cavs and their G-League affiliate, the Canton Charge. Holland is the first player the Cavaliers have signed on such a deal. He would also play his first NBA regular season games during this contract after previously only playing in one playoff game for Boston.

With the Cavaliers, Holland played 24 games and averaged 2.3 points per game. He went on to win the Eastern Conference championship with the Cavaliers, advancing to the NBA Finals. However, Cleveland, led by All-Star LeBron James, were swept by the Golden State Warriors.

Holland was waived by the Cavs on November 9, 2018.

=== Austin Spurs (2018–2019) ===
On November 19, 2018, the Austin Spurs announced that they had acquired the returning right to Holland and a 2019 second-round pick from the Canton Charge in exchange for Jaron Blossomgame.

=== San Miguel Beermen (2019) ===
On November 7, 2019, Holland signed with the San Miguel Beermen of the Philippine Basketball Association (PBA). He replaced Dez Wells as the team's import.

=== Hapoel Jerusalem (2019–2020) ===
On December 26, 2019, Holland signed with Hapoel Jerusalem of the Israeli Basketball Premier League as a replacement for Trent Lockett. He re-signed with the team on May 18, 2020, after averaging 13 points per game.

=== UNICS Kazan (2020–2021) ===
On July 27, 2020, Holland signed with Russian club UNICS Kazan of the VTB United League.

=== 2021–2022 ===
On August 23, 2021, Holland signed with Cariduros de Fajardo of the Baloncesto Superior Nacional. He averaged 12.8 points, 3.8 rebounds, 2.2 assists and 1.1 steals per game.

On February 5, 2022, Holland returned to UNICS Kazan of the VTB United League. He left the team in early 2022 due to the 2022 Russian invasion of Ukraine.

On March 6, 2022, Holland signed with Frutti Extra Bursaspor of the Basketbol Süper Ligi.

In July 2022, he briefly played for Cariduros de Fajardo.

=== Crvena zvezda (2022–2023) ===
On July 9, 2022, Holland signed a contract with Serbian club Crvena zvezda of the EuroLeague for the 2022–23 season. In 22 EuroLeague games, he averaged 3.6 points in under 10 minutes per contest. On June 29, 2023, he announced that he would be parting ways with the club.

=== Hapoel Tel Aviv (2023–2024) ===
On July 27, 2023, he signed with Hapoel Tel Aviv of the Israeli Basketball Premier League.

=== Santeros de Aguada (2025–present) ===
On January 2, 2025, Holland signed a contract with Santeros de Aguada until 2027.

== National team career ==
Holland is of Puerto Rican descent through his mother. He first represented the Puerto Rican national team in 2011 when he played in the 2011 Jenaro Marchand Continental Championship Cup.

== Career statistics ==
Legend
GP	Games played	GS	Games started	MPG	Minutes per game
FG%	Field goal percentage	3P%	3-point field goal percentage	FT%	Free throw percentage
RPG	Rebounds per game	APG	Assists per game	SPG	Steals per game
BPG	Blocks per game	PPG	Points per game	**Bold**	Career high

=== NBA ===
==== Regular season ====
Year	Team	GP	GS	MPG	FG%	3P%	FT%	RPG	APG	SPG	BPG	PPG
2017–18	Cleveland	**24**	0	**7.3**	**.288**	**.306**	**.692**	**1.0**	**.2**	**.3**	**.1**	**2.3**
2018–19	Cleveland	1	0	0.7	.000	.000	.000	.0	.0	.0	.0	0.0
Career		25	0	7.0	.288	.306	.692	1.0	.2	.3	.1	2.2

==== Playoffs ====
Year	Team	GP	GS	MPG	FG%	3P%	FT%	RPG	APG	SPG	BPG	PPG
2016	Boston	1	0	1.0	.000	.000	.000	.0	.0	.0	.0	.0
Career		1	0	1.0	.000	.000	.000	.0	.0	.0	.0	.0

=== College ===
Year	Team	GP	GS	MPG	FG%	3P%	FT%	RPG	APG	SPG	BPG	PPG
2007–08	Boston University	30	18	25.7	.438	.331	.649	5.0	1.0	1.5	**.3**	11.4
2008–09	Boston University	30	29	**35.5**	**.464**	**.396**	.769	5.5	1.1	**1.8**	**.3**	18.1
2009–10	Boston University	**35**	29	34.4	.459	.357	.851	**6.1**	1.1	1.6	**.3**	**19.2**
2010–11	Boston University	34	**32**	33.9	.386	.330	**.860**	5.8	**1.6**	1.4	**.3**	**19.2**
Career		129	108	32.5	.434	.355	.807	5.6	1.2	1.6	.3	17.1

== Personal life ==
The son of John Holland Sr. and Diana Mills, he enrolled in the College of Communications.
