= Joel Soriano =

American basketball player (born 2000)

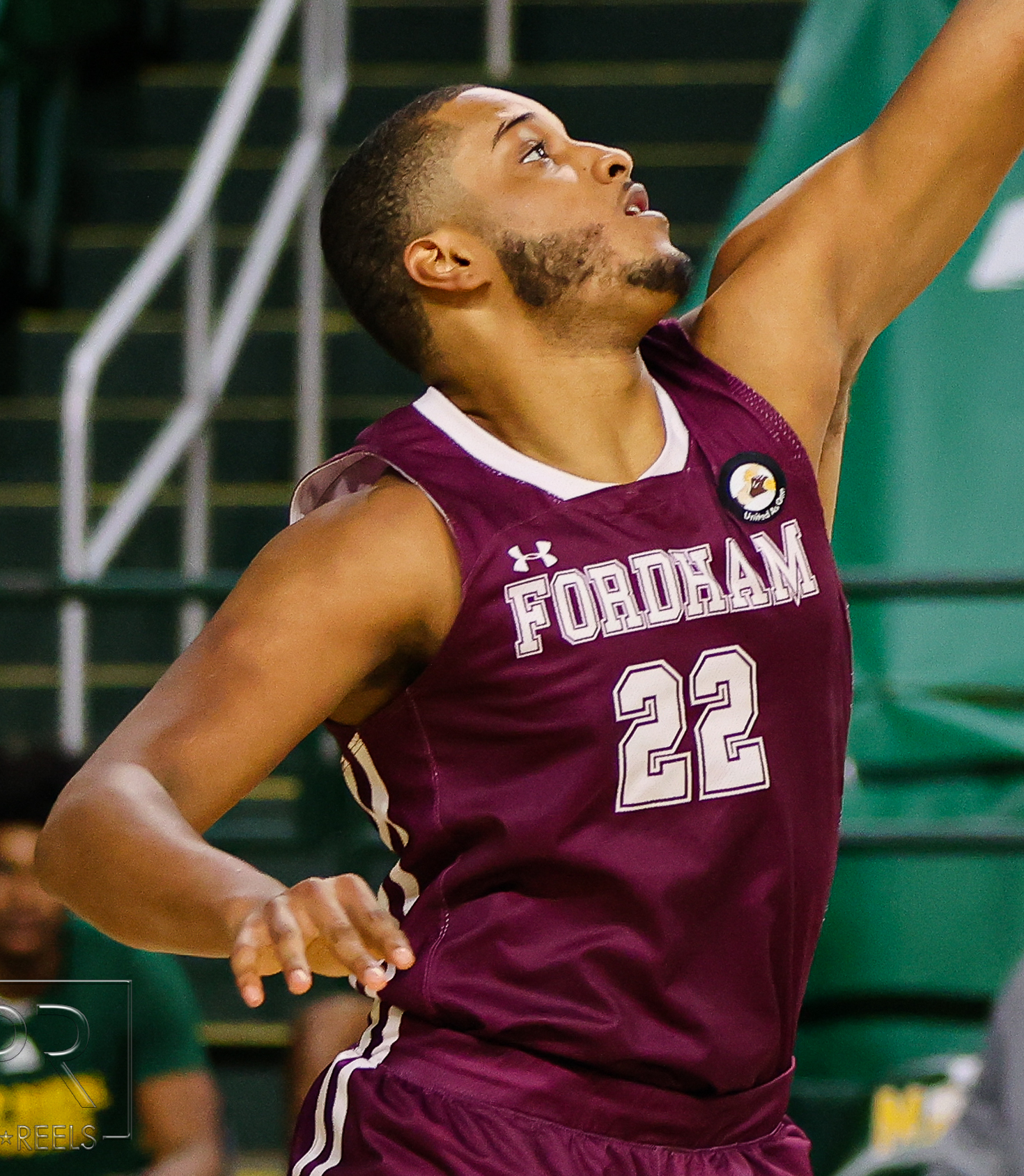
- Soriano in 2021

No. 12 – Obradoiro CAB
- Position: Center
- League: Liga ACB

Personal information
- Born: January 30, 2000 (age 26) Yonkers, New York, U.S.
- Listed height: 6 ft 10 in (2.08 m)
- Listed weight: 256 lb (116 kg)

Career information
- High school: Archbishop Stepinac (White Plains, New York); St. Thomas More School (Montville, Connecticut)
- College: Fordham (2019–2021); St. John's (2021–2024)
- NBA draft: 2024: undrafted
- Playing career: 2024–present

Career history
- 2024–2025: Greensboro Swarm
- 2025: Santeros de Aguada
- 2025–2026: Valencia
- 2025–2026: →Zaragoza
- 2026: →Ratiopharm Ulm
- 2026: Santeros de Aguada
- 2026–present: Obradoiro

Career highlights
- Second-team All-Big East (2023); Big East Most Improved Player (2023)
- Stats at NBA.com
- Stats at Basketball Reference

Joel Manuel Soriano (born January 30, 2000) is a Dominican-American professional basketball player for Obradoiro of the Liga ACB. He played college basketball for the Fordham Rams and the St. John's Red Storm.

== Early life and high school career ==
Soriano grew up in Yonkers, New York and attended Archbishop Stepinac High School He completed a post-graduate year at St. Thomas More School in Montville, Connecticut.

== College career ==
Soriano became a starter during his freshman season with the Rams and finished the year with five double doubles. As a sophomore, he averaged a near double-double, averaging 10.4 points per game and 9.2 rebounds per game. After the season, he entered the transfer portal.

On April 19, 2021, Soriano committed to St. John's. During the 2021–22 season, he started 26 of 30 games, averaging 6.4 points and 5.5 rebounds per game. Soriano broke out during the 2022–23 season, averaging 15.2 points and 11.9 rebounds per game. His performance earned him the Big East Conference Most Improved Player award and a second team All-Big East nod.

Soriano stayed with St. John's following the hiring of Rick Pitino as coach. Prior to the 2023–24 season, he was named to the Preseason All-Big East team and was placed on watchlists for the John R. Wooden Award and the Kareem Abdul-Jabbar Award.

== Professional career ==
=== Greensboro Swarm (2024–2025) ===
After going undrafted in the 2024 NBA draft, Soriano signed with the Charlotte Hornets on September 11, 2024, but was waived on September 28. On October 27, he joined the Greensboro Swarm.

=== Valencia Basket (2025–2026) ===
On May 15, 2025, Soriano was announced as a new player for Valencia Basket of the Liga ACB. After spending the first half of the 2025–26 season on loan with Basket Zaragoza, he was loaned out to Ratiopharm Ulm in January 2026.

=== Obradoiro (2026–present) ===
On July 29, 2026, he signed with Obradoiro of the Liga ACB.

== Career statistics ==
Legend
GP	Games played	GS	Games started	MPG	Minutes per game
FG%	Field goal percentage	3P%	3-point field goal percentage	FT%	Free throw percentage
RPG	Rebounds per game	APG	Assists per game	SPG	Steals per game
BPG	Blocks per game	PPG	Points per game	**Bold**	Career high

=== College ===
Year	Team	GP	GS	MPG	FG%	3P%	FT%	RPG	APG	SPG	BPG	PPG
2019–20	Fordham	30	12	19.5	.455	.000	.686	6.6	0.5	0.4	0.9	4.8
2020–21	Fordham	14	14	27.1	.545	.000	.558	9.2	0.9	0.4	0.8	10.4
2021–22	St. John's	30	26	18.9	.569	.000	.729	5.5	1.1	0.1	1.7	6.4
2022–23	St. John's	**33**	**33**	**30.4**	.563	.000	**.730**	**11.9**	1.3	0.3	1.4	15.2
2023–24	St. John's	31	30	28.2	**.582**	**.438**	.699	9.4	**1.4**	0.2	**1.8**	14.1
Career		128	115	24.7	.553	.438	.700	8.5	1.1	0.3	1.4	10.3

== Personal life ==
Soriano is Dominican American and competed for the Dominican Republic national team in the 2018 FIBA Under-18 Americas Championship.
