= Omar Samhan =

American-Egyptian professional basketball player

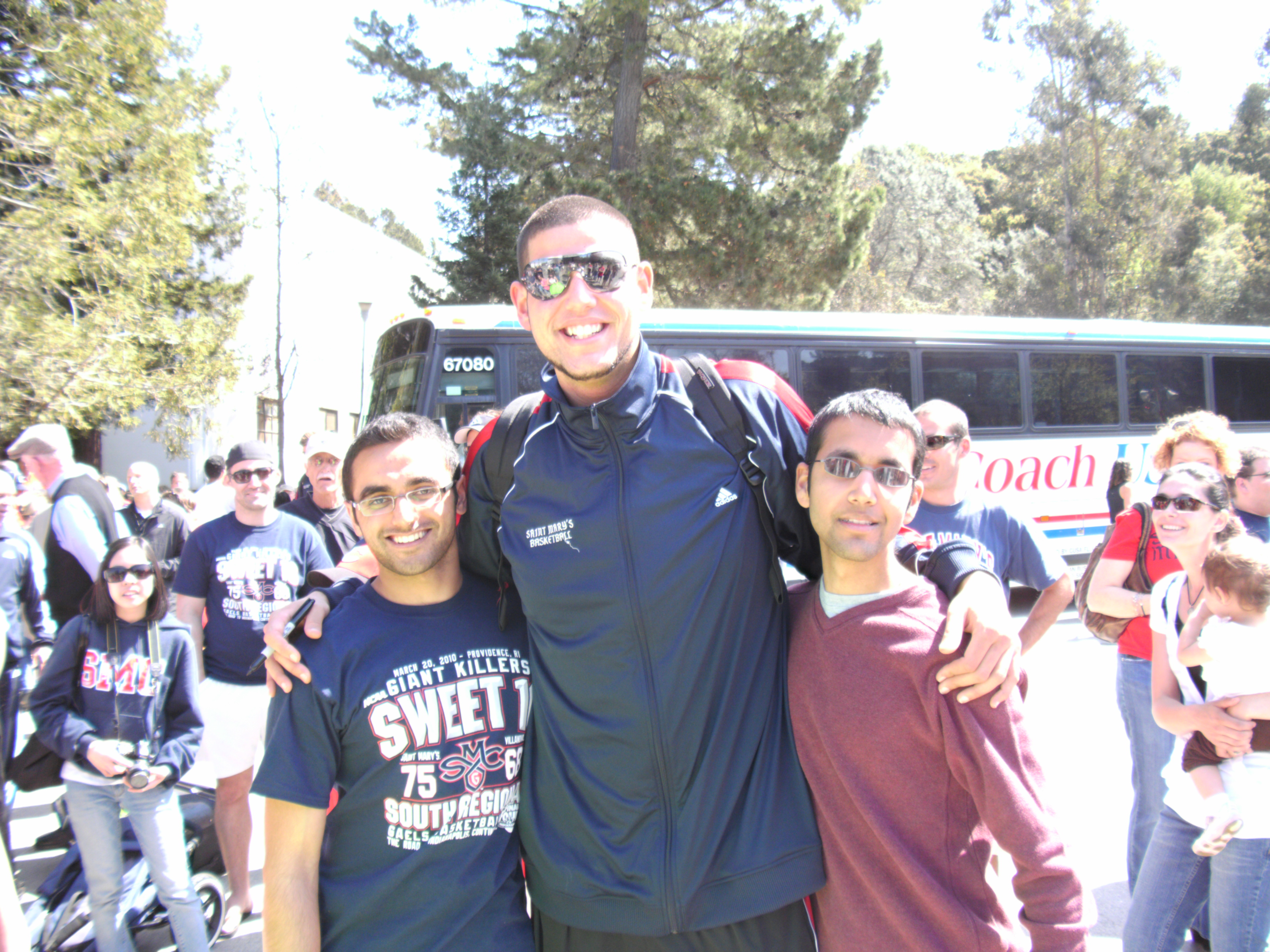
- Samhan (center) in 2010

Personal information
- Born: November 3, 1988 (age 38) Oakland, California, U.S.
- Listed height: 7 ft 1 in (2.16 m)
- Listed weight: 268 lb (122 kg)

Career information
- High school: San Ramon Valley (Danville, California)
- College: Saint Mary's (2006–2010)
- NBA draft: 2010: undrafted
- Playing career: 2010–2019
- Position: Center

Career history
- 2010–2011: Žalgiris
- 2012: Tropang Texters
- 2013: ratiopharm Ulm
- 2013–2014: Alexandria Sporting Club
- 2014–2015: Texas Legends
- 2015–2016: Townsville Crocodiles
- 2016: Atléticos de San Germán
- 2016–2017: Leuven Bears
- 2017: Santeros de Aguada
- 2017: Shiga Lakestars
- 2018: Cariduros de Fajardo
- 2019: Mineros de Zacatecas
- 2019: Plateros de Fresnillo

Career highlights
- Baltic League champion (2011); LKL champion (2011); Egyptian Basketball Premier League champion (2015); AP honorable mention All-American (2010); WCC Defensive Player of the Year (2010); 2× First-team All-WCC (2009, 2010); WCC All-Freshman Team (2007)

Omar Hassan Samhan (born November 3, 1988) is an American-Egyptian professional former basketball player. He played college basketball for Saint Mary's College of California where he was an honorable mention All-American in 2010. In 2011, Samhan joined the Egypt national basketball team.

== Career ==
=== College ===
In his freshman season with the Saint Mary's Gaels men's basketball, Samhan was named to the West Coast Conference All-Freshmen team and was a Freshman All-American selection by CollegeInsider.com. He played in all 32 games including seven starts and was the team's third highest scorer and second highest rebounder, averaged 9.2 points and 5.6 rebounds per game.

In his sophomore season, Samhan earned honorable mention All-WCC honors after starting every game and scoring in double figures 18 times. He finished third on the team in scoring (10.5 ppg) and second in rebounds (7.3 rpg).

In his junior season, Samhan earned first-team All-WCC honors after finishing 10th in the conference in scoring and third in rebounds and was second on the team in scoring (14.1 ppg) and rebounds (9.4 rpg). He also ranked 29th in the country in rebounds per game and 40th in the nation with 2.0 blocks per game.

In his senior season, Samhan scored 61 points in two NCAA tournament victories, including 32 points in a win over Villanova. He earned first-team All-WCC honors for the second straight year and was named the WCC Defensive Player of the Year. He also earned Associated Press honorable mention All-American honors after leading the WCC during the regular season in scoring (21.5 ppg), rebounds (11.1 rpg) and blocks (2.9 bpg).

=== Professional career ===
After going undrafted in the 2010 NBA draft, Samhan joined the Dallas Mavericks for the 2010 NBA Summer League. On July 16, 2010, he signed a two-year deal (with the option of a third) with Žalgiris of the Lithuanian Basketball League. He left Žalgiris after just one season.

On December 13, 2011, Samhan signed with the Houston Rockets.

In February 2012, Samhan signed with the Talk 'N Text Tropang Texters of the Philippine Basketball Association.

In February 2013, Samhan signed with ratiopharm Ulm of Germany for the rest of the 2012–13 season. I

In the summer of 2013, Samhan signed with the Alexandria Sporting Club for the 2013–14 Egyptian Basketball Premier League season.

On July 20, 2014, Samhan signed with King Wilki Morskie of Poland for the 2014–15 season. However, On November 3, 2014, Samhan was acquired by the Texas Legends of the NBA Development League. On March 13, 2015, he was waived by the Legends after appearing in 18 games. On April 4, he was acquired by the Los Angeles D-Fenders, closing out the season with the team.

On December 9, 2015, Samham signed with the Townsville Crocodiles for the rest of the 2015–16 NBL season. He made his debut for the Crocodiles the following day, recording 10 points and 6 rebounds off the bench in a 101–100 win over the Adelaide 36ers. In 12 games for the Crocodiles, he averaged 13.4 points, 8.9 rebounds, 1.7 assists and 1.1 blocks per game. Following the conclusion of the NBL season, he snubbed both the NW Tasmania Thunder and Taranaki Mountainairs to sign in Puerto Rico with Atléticos de San Germán for the 2016 BSN season.

On September 15, 2016, Samhan snubbed Trabzonspor Medical Park to sign in Belgium with Leuven Bears of Scooore League for 2016–2017 season . In March 2017, he parted ways with Leuven.

On April 2, 2017, Samhan signed with other Puerto rican side Santeros de Aguada.

On July 23, 2017, he signed with the Japanese team Shiga Lakestars.

On April 22, 2018, he returned for the third time to Puerto Rico to sign with Cariduros de Fajardo.

On February 7, 2019, he signed with the Mexican team Mineros de Zacatecas. On August 24, 2019, he signed with the new Mexican team Plateros Fresnillo .

=== The Basketball Tournament ===
Omar Samhan played for Team Gael Force in the 2018 edition of The Basketball Tournament. In three games, he averaged a team-high 17.7 points per game, 4.7 rebounds per game and 3.7 assists per game. Team Gael Force made it to the Super 16 before falling to eventual tournament runner-up, Eberlein Drive.

He also played for the same team in the 2019 edition of the Tournament. In one game, he made the double-double as he scored 12 points, 10 rebounds and 1 steal. Team Gael Force fell to Jackson TN.

== Personal life ==
Samhan, of Egyptian and Irish descent, is the son of Marianne and Hassan Samhan and is the youngest of four children. He has an older sister, Katie, and older brothers, Sadek and Jon. Samhan is Muslim.
