= José Abreu Coliseum =

Sports venue in Isabela, Puerto Rico

Coordinates: 18.489582°N 67.024644°W

Coliseo Jose "Buga" Abreu Méndez
- Interactive map of Coliseo Jose "Buga" Abreu Méndez
- Full name: Jose "Buga" Abreu Méndez
- Location: Isabela, Puerto Rico 00662
- Capacity: 5,000+

Construction
- Opened: 1996, 2022

Tenants
- Gallitos de Isabela (BSN) (1996-2005; 2010-2011; 2017-2018); Pollitas de Isabela (BSNF) (1998-2017; 2023-now); Playeras de Isabela (FSVL) (2003-2005); Gallitos de Isabela (LPVS) (2024-now)

Jose "Buga" Abreu Coliseum (Spanish: Coliseo Jose "Buga" Abreu Méndez) is a sports arena that is located in Isabela, Puerto Rico that seats 5,000 for basketball & volleyball games. The home of the Isabela Bantams (Spanish: Gallitos de Isabela) men's basketball team and the Isabela Pullets (Spanish: Pollitas de Isabela) women's basketball team. The Coliseum was the venue for the Taekwwondo events for the 2010 Central American and Caribbean Games.

The coliseum was named after a basketball player, Jose "Buga" Abreu Méndez, who died in a car accident after a Bantams away game during a BSN season in the 1990s.

The original Jose Abreu Coliseum was opened in 1996 and demolished in 2018; the new one was reconstructed and refurnished in 2022, following damage from Hurricane Maria in 2017.
