= Joel Jones =

American basketball player

Joel Jones-Camacho
Personal information
- Born: July 17, 1981 (age 45) San Diego, California
- Listed height: 6 ft 6 in (1.98 m)
- Listed weight: 200 lb (91 kg)

Career information
- College: Grossmont CC (1999–2001); Sacramento State (2001–2004)
- NBA draft: 2004: undrafted
- Playing career: 2002–2016
- Position: Shooting guard

Career history
- 2002–2005: Vaqueros de Bayamón
- 2005–2006: Shandong Lions
- 2006: Vaqueros de Bayamón
- 2007: BG Karlsruhe
- 2007–2008: Leones de Ponce
- 2009–2012: Piratas de Quebradillas
- 2012: Indios de San Francisco
- 2012–2013: Boca Juniors
- 2013: Brujos de Guayama
- 2014: Atléticos de San Germán
- 2015–2016: Capitanes de Arecibo

Career highlights
- BSN champion (2016)

Joel "JoJo" Jones-Camacho (born July 17, 1981) is a Puerto Rican-American former professional basketball player. Jones has played in the NCAA, Baloncesto Superior Nacional (BSN) with Vaqueros de Bayamón, Leones de Ponce, Piratas de Quebradillas, and internationally in the Chinese Basketball Association with the Shandong Lions. Jones was a member of the Puerto Rican national basketball team since 2007.

== Biography ==
Jones played his collegiate career at Sacramento State from 2001–2004 after transferring from Grossmont College. Jones was All-Big Sky Conference in 2001–2002 and 2003–2004 seasons with the Sacramento State Hornets.

Jones has played professionally in the National Superior Basketball League of Puerto Rico since 2002 and in the Chinese Basketball Association during the 2005–2006 season.

In 2006 Jones was allocated to the Los Angeles D-Fenders of the NBDL. He was waived at the conclusion of the NBDL Pre-Season on 22 November 2006.

Jones played in Germany for the BG Karlsruhe, and now he plays for the Quebradillas Pirates in Puerto Rico. While participating in the Olympic Qualifying Tournament, Jones signed a contract with Ironi Ramat of the Ligat Winner league, but later announced that he will not come to Israel because of family problems.

== International career ==
During summer of 2007, Jones represented Puerto Rico as a member of the Puerto Rican National Basketball Team during the 2007 Pan-American Games winning the Silver Medal. In 2008, Jones was included as a reserve player in the national team, officially joining the roster when two vacants were open.

Jones is not in the 2010 Puerto Rico national basketball team and won't be playing in the 2010 FIBA World Championship in Turkey.

== Career stats ==
Jones's NCAA stats are 12.1 PPG, 4.2 RPG, 1.4 SPG, 0.8 BPG, .425 field goal percentage, .350 3-point percentage.
