= Brandon Costner =

American basketball player

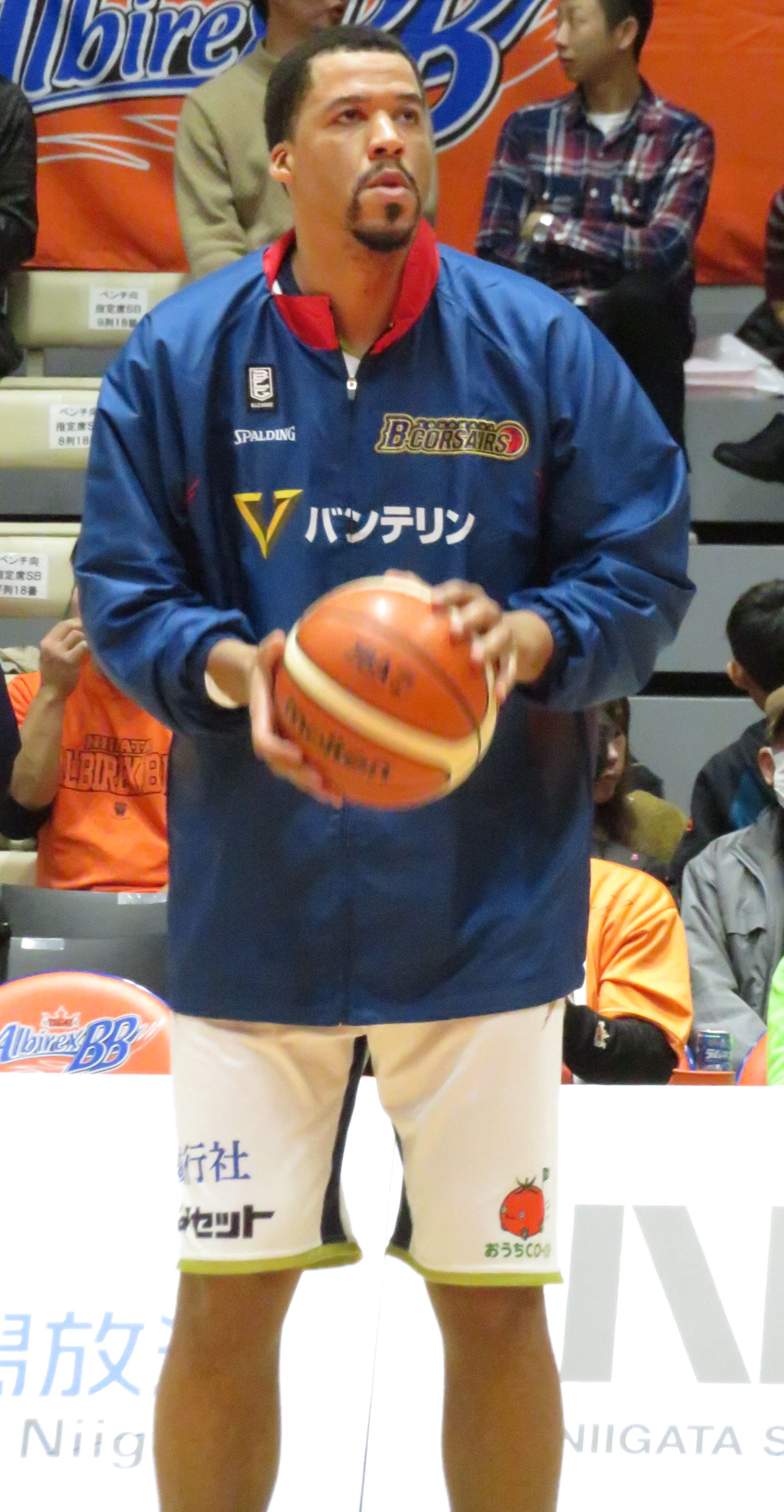
- Costner with the Yokohama B-Corsairs in 2018

Personal information
- Born: July 21, 1987 (age 39) Montclair, New Jersey, U.S.
- Listed height: 6 ft 9 in (2.06 m)
- Listed weight: 235 lb (107 kg)

Career information
- High school: Seton Hall Preparatory School (West Orange, New Jersey)
- College: NC State (2005–2009)
- NBA draft: 2009: undrafted
- Playing career: 2009–2021
- Position: Power forward

Career history
- 2009–2010: Belfius Mons-Hainaut
- 2010–2011: Utah Flash
- 2011–2012: Los Angeles D-Fenders
- 2012: Limoges CSP
- 2013–2014: Los Angeles D-Fenders
- 2014–2015: Jiangsu Monkey King
- 2016: Caciques de Humacao
- 2016: Guizhou White Tigers
- 2017: Caciques de Humacao
- 2017: Hebei Xianglan
- 2018: Champville SC
- 2018: Caciques de Humacao
- 2018–2019: Yokohama B-Corsairs
- 2019–2020: Eastern Long Lions
- 2020–2021: Santeros de Aguada
- 2021: Patriots
- 2021: Gigantes de Carolina
- 2021: Indios de Mayagüez
- 2021: Grises de Humacao

Career highlights
- BSN All-Star (2016); All-NBA D-League Third Team (2012); Third-team All-ACC (2007); ACC All-Freshman team (2007); Third-team Parade All-American (2005); McDonald's All-American (2005)

Brandon Jay Costner (born July 21, 1987) is an American former professional basketball player. He most recently played for Puerto Rican teams Grises de Humacao and Santeros de Aguada of the Baloncesto Superior Nacional. He played college basketball for the NC State Wolfpack.

== College career ==
Just five games into the 2005–06 season, Costner sustained a season-ending injury, earning a medical redshirt and making 2006–07 his freshman season. His highest scoring game was in the 2007 ACC Tournament against Duke in which he scored 30 points in the Wolfpack victory.

== Professional career ==
In March 2009, Costner announced that he would forgo his senior season at North Carolina State and enter the 2009 NBA draft. After going undrafted, he joined the Chicago Bulls for the 2009 NBA Summer League. Later that year, he signed with Belfius Mons-Hainaut of Belgium for the 2009–10 season.

In November 2010, he was acquired by the Utah Flash as they selected him with the 8th pick in the 2010 NBA D-League Draft.

In November 2011, he was acquired by the Los Angeles D-Fenders. Following the conclusion of the 2011–12 D-League season, he joined Limoges CSP Elite of France for the remainder of their season.

In November 2013, he was re-acquired by the Los Angeles D-Fenders.

In July 2016, he signed with the Guizhou White Tigers for the 2016 NBL season.

On February 8, 2017, he re-joined the Caciques de Humacao.

In May, 2017, he signed with Hebei Xianglan of China for the 2017 NBL season.

In January 2018, Costner signed with Champville SC of the Lebanese Basketball League.

In May 2021, he joined the Rwandan team Patriots BBC to play in the 2021 BAL season.

=== BAL statistics ===
Year	Team	GP	GS	MPG	FG%	3P%	FT%	RPG	APG	SPG	BPG	PPG
2021	Patriots	6	5	25.5	.400	.364	.667	4.5	2.7	.7	.0	11.0
Career		6	5	25.5	.400	.364	.667	4.5	2.7	.7	.0	11.0

== Personal life ==
Costner is the son of former St. Joseph's and professional player Tony Costner.
