= Chane Behanan =

American basketball player (born 1992)

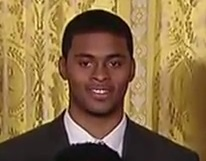
- Behanan visits the White House in 2013 for a ceremony honoring Louisville's 2013 national championship.

Free agent
- Position: Forward

Personal information
- Born: September 24, 1992 (age 34) Cincinnati, Ohio, U.S.
- Listed height: 6 ft 6 in (1.98 m)
- Listed weight: 250 lb (113 kg)

Career information
- High school: Aiken (Cincinnati, Ohio); Bowling Green (Bowling Green, Kentucky)
- College: Louisville (2011–2013)
- NBA draft: 2014: undrafted
- Playing career: 2014–present

Career history
- 2014–2015: Rio Grande Valley Vipers
- 2015–2016: Soles de Mexicali
- 2016: Santeros de Aguada
- 2016: Metros de Santiago
- 2016–2017: Reno Bighorns
- 2017: Salt Lake City Stars
- 2017: Capitanes de Arecibo
- 2017: Brujos de Guayama
- 2017: Aquila Basket Trento
- 2017–2018: Salt Lake City Stars
- 2018: Soles de Mexicali
- 2019: Atléticos de San Germán
- 2020: Santeros de Aguada

Career highlights
- NCAA champion (2013)*; Big East All-Rookie Team (2012); Second-team Parade All-American (2011); McDonald's All-American (2011); *Later vacated

Chane Xavier Behanan (/ˈʃeɪn bəˈhænən/ SHAYN bə-HAN-ən; born September 24, 1992) is an American professional basketball player. Behanan, who won an NCAA title at Louisville, was going to transfer to Colorado State to redshirt the 2014–15 season but instead declared for the 2014 NBA draft in which he subsequently went undrafted.

== Early life ==
Behanan was born and mostly raised in Cincinnati, growing up in a troubled inner city neighborhood infested by the drug culture; one of his older brothers had been arrested on drug charges. He indicated in a 2012 interview that his time in that neighborhood drove him to succeed in basketball:

I just have to stay at it. In my family, I think I'm just the last person left that can make something happen. If it ain't me, it's nobody."

During his childhood, the family home was destroyed in a fire, and he, his mother, and four siblings moved in with one of his grandmothers. Behanan's mother eventually decided that inner-city Cincinnati was not a good place for him, and used family connections to send him to Bowling Green, Kentucky before his junior year of high school. In his senior season at Bowling Green High School, he averaged 23.3 points and 14.4 rebounds.

He had previously verbally committed to play college basketball at Cincinnati, but changed his commitment to Louisville while in Bowling Green. Behanan would later say that the change could have saved his life—a few months after he arrived at Louisville, a longtime friend in Cincinnati was shot and killed during a robbery. Behanan said about the incident, "He [the friend] was just at the wrong place at the wrong time. To be honest, I really don't think I'd be here today if I'd stayed in Cincinnati."

== College career ==
In his freshman year with the Louisville Cardinals, Behanan averaged 9.5 points, 7.6 rebounds, and 26 minutes per game, helping lead the Cardinals to the Final Four, where they lost to eventual national champion Kentucky. A communications major, Behanan made the Dean's List in his first two semesters at Louisville.

Although expressing a desire to play in the NBA, Behanan returned for his sophomore season and averaged 9.8 points, 6.5 rebounds, and 26.1 minutes per game, helping lead the Cardinals to win the 2013 NCAA Men's Division I Basketball Tournament, which was Louisville's third national championship and first since 1986. That national championship has since been vacated by the NCAA.

Just before the start of the 2013–14 season, coach Rick Pitino suspended Behanan indefinitely for an unspecified violation of team rules. Behanan was reinstated in time to play against Hofstra on November 12, the second game of the season. In the twelve games that he played in 2013–14, he averaged 7.6 points, 6.3 rebounds, and 18.6 minutes per game. On December 30, Pitino announced that Behanan was dismissed from the team for violation of university policy. Behanan later admitted that he was dismissed from the team for use of marijuana.

On January 27, 2014, it was reported that Behanan had enrolled at Colorado State University. However, before making an appearance for Colorado State, Behanan declared for the 2014 NBA draft.

On April 2, 2014, Louisville police cited Behanan for marijuana possession, after Behanan did an interview with local radio station WHBE.

== Professional career ==
Behanan went undrafted in the 2014 NBA draft but on November 1, 2014, Behanan was selected by the Rio Grande Valley Vipers with the 14th overall pick in the NBA Development League Draft. On February 6, 2015, he was waived by Rio Grande Valley. In 13 games with one start, Behanan averaged 4.5 points and 3.3 rebounds. On April 2, 2015, he was acquired by the Reno Bighorns, but never played for them.

On November 27, 2015, Behanan signed with Soles de Mexicali of Mexico.

On February 24, 2016, he signed with Santeros de Aguada of the Baloncesto Superior Nacional. Behanan lead the Santeros to the semifinals of the 2016 season where the Santeros eventually lost 4–2 to the league sub-champions Vaqueros de Bayamón. He averaged 17.5 points per game and 9.6 rebounds per game in the regular season making him a candidate for the league Most Valuable Player award.

In 2016 Behanan joined the NBA Dallas Mavericks for NBA Summer League. On October 31, 2016, Behanan was re-acquired by the Reno Bighorns. In 19 games, he averaged 8.8 points and 4.4 rebounds.

On February 2, 2017, Behanan was traded to the Salt Lake City Stars.

On July 7, 2017, Behanan signed with the Kia Picanto of the Philippine Basketball Association as their reinforcement for the 2017 PBA Governors' Cup. However, he was prohibited from playing after exceeding the height limit.

On July 18, 2017, Behanan signed with Italian club Aquila Basket Trento. On December 14, 2017, he parted ways with Trento after averaging 11.9 points and 5.5 rebounds per game.

On September 8, 2019, Behanan signed with Hapoel Ramat Gan Givatayim of the Israel National League. On October 24, 2019, he parted ways with the Urduns before appearing in a game for them.

On March 1, 2020, he has signed with Santeros de Aguada of the Baloncesto Superior Nacional (BSN).

== The Basketball Tournament ==
Chane Behanan played for the Tim Thomas Playaz in the 2018 edition of The Basketball Tournament. He scored 12 points and had 8 rebounds in the team's first-round loss to Team Arkansas.
