= Liga de Baloncesto Puertorriqueña =

Second tier level men's professional basketball league in Puerto Rico

- Founded: 1984; 41 years ago (as La Liga del Pueblo)
- Country: Puerto Rico
- Federation: Puerto Rican Basketball Federation
- Confederation: FIBA Americas
- Divisions: 4
- Number of teams: 43
- Level on pyramid: 2
- International cup(s): Champions League
- Current champions: Guerrilleros de Rio Grande (1st title)
- TV partners: Telemundo; WAPA 2 Deportes; DirecTV Puerto Rico
- Website: www.lbpoficial.com

The Liga de Baloncesto Puertorriqueña (LBP) is the second tier of professional basketball in Puerto Rico. It is a FIBA-sanctioned league, founded by the Puerto Rican Basketball Federation. The current champions are the Capitalinos de San Juan.

== History ==
Founded in 1984 as “La Liga del Pueblo”, the second-tier league in Puerto Rico was intended as a place to develop local players who would represent their communities with pride. There was originally an age limit of 20–30. The success of the Baloncesto Superior Nacional in the 1980s prompted this demand. Soon the league would spread from coast-to-coast and include up to 48 teams, garnering a TV deal with Northstar Communications, and leaguewide sponsorships from Toyota and Popular, Inc.

== Current Teams ==
For the 2021–2022 season which begins 12/1/2021, there are 44 teams. These teams are grouped into four divisions, Norte (North), Este (East), Sur (South), and Oeste (West). Many reflect the first-tier clubs that share the city; i.e. Cariduros de Fajardo being the designation for both the Baloncesto Superior Nacional team and the LBP team.

2021-2022 Divisions
Norte	Este	Sur	Oeste
Barranquitas	Humacao	Patillas	Yauco
Naranjito	Las Piedras	Ponce	Quebradillas
Dorado	Carolina	Juana Díaz	San Germán
Morovis	Guaynabo	Santa Isabel	Lajas
Cataño	Río Grande	Coamo	Mayagüez
Arecibo	Fajardo	Salinas	Añasco
Vega Baja	Trujillo Alto	Aibonito	Las Marías
Corozal	San Juan	Adjuntas	Aguadilla
Toa Baja	Loíza	Villalba	Moca
Toa Alta	Juncos	Guayama	San Sebastián
Lares	Comerío	Arroyo	Hatillo
