= Aguada Coliseum =

Arena in Aguada, Puerto Rico

Coordinates: 18°22′41.19″N 67°11′54.51″W

Coliseo Multiusos Ismael "Chavalillo" Delgado
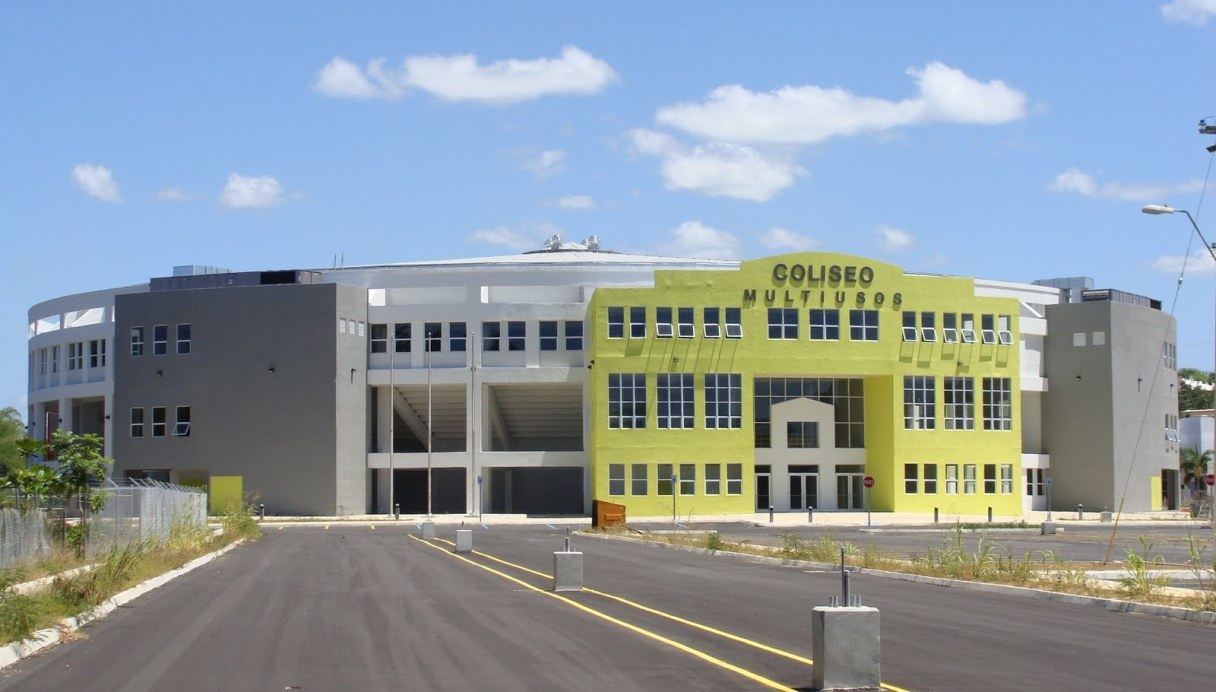
- Interactive map of Coliseo Multiusos Ismael "Chavalillo" Delgado
- Location: Aguada, Puerto Rico
- Capacity: 7,500

Construction
- Groundbreaking: 2003
- Opened: 2010

Tenants
- Santeros de Aguada (2016-2021) and (2024-present) Santeros de Aguada LBP

Coliseo Multiusos Ismael "Chavalillo" Delgado is an arena in Aguada, Puerto Rico.From the very early 2000s discussions began on construction of a new arena to replace the old Cancha All-Star, and to potentially bring via expansion or relocation a new Baloncesto Superior Nacional team. Began construction in 2003, the coliseum faced many construction problems as Aguada’s economic situation worsened, causing funds for construction to be shrunk as the stadium stayed paralyzed for several years until being finished in 2010.It hosted some of the judo and wrestling events for the 2010 Central American and Caribbean Games. It serves as the home court for the Santeros de Aguada team in both Baloncesto Superior Nacional and Liga de Baloncesto Puertorriqueña.For 2018 till 2023, the coliseum suffered from air conditioning problems causing the temporary relocation of the Santeros de Aguada.The coliseum had to be close for a 1.8 million dollar renovation that featured a new basketball floor, new air conditioning, and a new paint job for the interior and exterior of the coliseum. The Santeros returned in 2024. The coliseum is named after Ismael Delgado, a sprinter from Aguada and Olympic athlete who won a silver medal in 1954. It's situated on Avenida Nativo Alers in Aguada, Puerto Rico.
