= Gallitos de Isabela =

Basketball team based in Isabela, Puerto Rico

- Leagues: Baloncesto Superior Nacional
- Founded: 1969
- History: Gallitos de Isabela (1969–2005; 2010–2011; 2017)
- Arena: José "Buga" Abreu Coliseum
- Capacity: 5,000
- Location: Isabela, Puerto Rico
- Team colors: Green, yellow
- Ownership: N/A
Home	Away

Gallitos de Isabela are a professional basketball team based in Isabela, Puerto Rico, currently competing in the Liga de Baloncesto Puertorriqueña, the second tier of professional basketball in Puerto Rico. They play their home games at the José Abreu Coliseum, refurbished in 2023 in the aftermath of Hurricane Maria. The team was managed by legendary Hall of Fame coach Phil Jackson between 1984 and 1986.

== History ==
In 1984, the Gallitos reached the BSN Finals, during that year known as the Copa Olimpica, due to a scandal concerning the playing eligibility of a Leones de Ponce player named David Ponce. They lost to the defending champions, Indios de Canovanas, in six games. This was during the franchise's "golden era", when players like Edwin Pellot and Frankie Torruellas played for the Gallitos. That team was coached by American Phil Jackson, who coached the team from 1984 to 1986, leading them to the playoffs in 1984, 1985 and 1986.

The team was folded several times over the years due to struggling financially and the hurricanes destroying the arena. They managed to rebuild the "Buga" coliseum, but lost their spot in the top division, Baloncesto Superior Nacional. Efforts were made in 2023 to move the Cariduros de Fajardo to Isabela after the Jose Buga arena was reconstructed, but plans fell through and the Cariduros moved to Aguada instead. On September 18 of 2026 it was reported by BSN insider Mr. Krossover that the owner of the Indios De Mayagüez had solicited relocation to Isabela, later being confirmed by the league itself, a vote on approving the move will occur September 30.

== Current roster ==
Note: Flags indicate national team eligibility at FIBA-sanctioned events. Players may hold other non-FIBA nationalities not displayed.

Gallitos de Isabela roster
Players
Coaches

Pos.	No.	Nat.	Name	Ht.	Age
SG	31	(Puerto Rico)	Altreche, Jeremy	6 ft 3 in (1.91 m)	28 – 24 August 1998
G	24	(Puerto Rico)	Cordero, Yahir	6 ft 2 in (1.88 m)	22 – 2 April 2004
G/F	81	(Puerto Rico)	Crispin, Leroy	6 ft 3 in (1.91 m)	22 – 18 July 2004
G	5	(Puerto Rico)	Deliz, Janiel	6 ft 1 in (1.85 m)	20 – 9 December 2005
SG	20	(Puerto Rico)	Dimaio, Joseph	6 ft 3 in (1.91 m)	26 – 4 April 2000
PG	17	(Puerto Rico)	López, Joel	5 ft 11 in (1.80 m)	24 – 17 December 2001
PF	45	(Puerto Rico)	Mantilla, Marvin	6 ft 7 in (2.01 m)	21 – 10 June 2005
F	9	(Puerto Rico)	Pérez, Daniel	6 ft 3 in (1.91 m)	28 – 23 June 1998
G	7	(Puerto Rico)	Quiñones, Javier	6 ft 3 in (1.91 m)	27 – 5 October 1999
G/F	1	(Puerto Rico)	Rodríguez, Jan	6 ft 4 in (1.93 m)	27 – 24 August 1999
F	13	(Puerto Rico)	Rosario, Gabriel	6 ft 3 in (1.91 m)	25 – 31 May 2001
PG	33	(Puerto Rico)	Segui, Jonathan	5 ft 11 in (1.80 m)	33 – 6 September 1993
G/F	2	(Puerto Rico)	Stevenson, Khalil	6 ft 3 in (1.91 m)	29 – 15 June 1997
G	30	(Puerto Rico)	Vargas, Gilbert	6 ft 1 in (1.85 m)	20 – 12 December 2005
G/F	99	(Puerto Rico)	Vélez, Isaac	6 ft 1 in (1.85 m)	27 – 22 September 1999

Head coach

- (Puerto Rico) Omar González

Assistant coach(es)

- (Puerto Rico) TBA

Legend

- (C) Team captain
- (I) Import player
- Injured

== Notable players ==
Note: Flags indicate national team eligibility at FIBA-sanctioned events. Players may hold other non-FIBA nationalities not displayed.

Criteria

To appear in this section a player must have either:

- Set a club record or won an individual award while at the club
- Played at least one official international match for their national team at any time
- Played at least one official NBA match at any time.

- (Puerto Rico) José Abreu
- (Puerto Rico) Mickey Coll
- (Puerto Rico) Edwin Pellot
- (Puerto Rico) Jimmy Thordsen
- (Puerto Rico) Frankie Torruellas

== Head coaches ==
- (Puerto Rico) Flor Meléndez
- (United States) Phil Jackson
