= Santeros de Aguada =

Puerto Rican professional basketball team

- Nickname: "Iguanas"
- Leagues: Baloncesto Superior Nacional
- Founded: 1992 (Liga de Baloncesto Puertorriqueña); 2016 (founded in the Baloncesto Superior Nacional); 2024 (relocated back)
- History: Santeros de Aguada (1992–1998; 2016–2021; 2024–present)
- Arena: Coliseo Multiusos Ismael "Chavalillo" Delgado
- Capacity: 7,500
- Location: Aguada, Puerto Rico
- Team colors: Red, white, green
- Head coach: Rafael “Pachy” Cruz
- Ownership: Wilson López
- Championships: 1 (2019)
- Website: https://www.guerrabsn.com/equipos/santeros
Home	Away	Third

Santeros de Aguada are a Puerto Rican professional basketball team of the Baloncesto Superior Nacional (BSN). The team was originally based in Aguada, Puerto Rico, and although the team moved to Fajardo in 2021, even changing their name and re-branding to Cariduros de Fajardo with the move, the team was moved again to Aguada to start the 2024 season.

== History ==
The team was founded in 1992 and participated in the Liga del Pueblo (now defunct Liga de Baloncesto Puertorriqueña) during seven seasons before folding in 1998 due to financial problems. In late 2015 it was announced the team was refounded and joined the Baloncesto Superior Nacional for the 2016 season with the purchase of the Maratonistas de Coamo franchise and later relocation to Aguada, Puerto Rico.

The team reached the 2019 BSN Finals against the Leones de Ponce (basketball), winning the franchise's first and only national championship within the BSN league, four games to two. In Game Five a game in which they trailed by 18 points with four minutes to go, they won by four 95-91, after several consecutive made threes.

The team relocated in 2021 after problems from their arena stemming back to the 2017 hurricane, Hurricane Maria. In late 2023 the Grises de Humacao, were looking to relocate from their municipality thanks to low fan support and attempted a relocation to Isabela to reform the Gallitos de Isabela. The relocation failed as owners voted 6-6 in favor of the move and later approved a move back to Aguada in 2024 thanks in part to a 1.8 million dollar renovation of the Aguada Coliseum.

== Home arenas ==
- Cancha All-Star de Aguada (1992–1998)
- Coliseo Multiusos Ismael "Chavalillo" Delgado (2016–present)

== Current roster ==
Note: Flags indicate national team eligibility at FIBA-sanctioned events. Players may hold other non-FIBA nationalities not displayed.

Santeros de Aguada roster
Players
Coaches

Pos.	No.	Nat.	Name	Ht.	Wt.	Age
F/C	1	(United States) (Puerto Rico)	Rosado, Giancarlo	6 ft 8 in (2.03 m)	245 lb (111 kg)	23 – 4 December 2002
F	5	(Puerto Rico)	Allende, Leandro	6 ft 6 in (1.98 m)	200 lb (91 kg)	28 – 4 August 1998
PG	7	(Puerto Rico)	Lee, Matthew	6 ft 0 in (1.83 m)	175 lb (79 kg)	27 – 25 October 1999
SF	8	(United States)	Camper, Manny	6 ft 7 in (2.01 m)	205 lb (93 kg)	27 – 18 May 1999
G	9	(Puerto Rico)	Ralat, Antonio	6 ft 2 in (1.88 m)	190 lb (86 kg)	30 – 24 October 1996
PG	10	(Puerto Rico)	Gandía-Rosa, Iván	6 ft 1 in (1.85 m)	190 lb (86 kg)	29 – 14 September 1997
G/F	12	(Puerto Rico)	Martinez, Miguel	6 ft 4 in (1.93 m)	200 lb (91 kg)	23 – 9 January 2003
PG	13	(Puerto Rico)	Morales, Robiel	6 ft 2 in (1.88 m)	175 lb (79 kg)	25 – 3 August 2001
SG	15	(United States)	Febres, Jase	6 ft 5 in (1.96 m)	195 lb (88 kg)	27 – 28 July 1999
C	18	(Puerto Rico)	Pérez, Owen	6 ft 8 in (2.03 m)	245 lb (111 kg)	34 – 28 June 1992
SF	23	(United States) (Puerto Rico)	Holland, John (DC)	6 ft 5 in (1.96 m)	205 lb (93 kg)	38 – 6 November 1988
G	24	(Puerto Rico)	Pérez, Harold	6 ft 4 in (1.93 m)	175 lb (79 kg)	23 – 19 October 2003
C	25	(Dominican Republic) (United States)	Soriano, Joel (I)	6 ft 10 in (2.08 m)	255 lb (116 kg)	26 – 30 January 2000
G	26	(Dominican Republic)	Mendoza, Rigoberto (I)	6 ft 3 in (1.91 m)	190 lb (86 kg)	34 – 6 July 1992
F/C	31	(United States) (North Macedonia)	Wiley, Jacob (I)	6 ft 8 in (2.03 m)	220 lb (100 kg)	32 – 4 August 1994

Head coach

- (Puerto Rico) Rafael 'Pachy' Cruz

Assistant coach(es)

- (Puerto Rico) Leo Arill
- (Puerto Rico) Carlos González

Athletic trainer(s)

- (Puerto Rico) Luis Colón
- (Puerto Rico) Jarito González

Legend

- (C) Team captain
- (DC) Dual citizenship
- (I) Import player
- Injured

- Roster
Updated: 30 June 2026

Pos.	Starting 5	Bench 1	Bench 2
C	Joel Soriano	Jacob Wiley	Owen Pérez
PF	Manny Camper	Giancarlo Rosado	Miguel Martínez
SF	John Holland	Jase Febres	Leandro Allende
SG	Rigoberto Mendoza	Antonio Ralat	Harold Pérez
PG	Iván Gandía-Rosa	Matthew Lee	Robiel Morales

== Notable players ==
To appear in this section a player must have either:
- Set a club record or won an individual award as a professional player.
- Played at least one official international match for his senior national team at any time.

- (United States) (Puerto Rico) John Holland
- (Puerto Rico) Ricky Sánchez
- (Australia) Daniel Johnson
- (Brazil) Rafael Hettsheimeir
- (Dominican Republic) Rigoberto Mendoza
- (Egypt) Omar Samhan
- (United States) Derrick Byars
- (United States) Dexter Pittman
- (United States) Ricky Ledo
- (United States) Chane Behanan
- (United States) Lamar Patterson
- (United States) Albert Burditt
- (United States) Danya Abrams
- (United States) Sean Green
- (United States) Abdul Shamsid-Deen
- (United States) Chinanu Onuaku
- (United States) / (North Macedonia) Jacob Wiley
