= Caciques de Humacao =

Basketball team of Humacao, Puerto Rico

- Leagues: BSN
- Founded: 2010
- Dissolved: 2018
- History: Caciques de Humacao (2010–2018)
- Arena: Marcelo Trujillo Coliseum
- Capacity: 8,000
- Location: Humacao, Puerto Rico
- Team colors: Green, red, yellow, white
- Championships: 0
- Website: caciqueshumacao.com

Caciques de Humacao was a professional basketball team based in Humacao, Puerto Rico. The club competed in the National Superior Basketball (Baloncesto Superior Nacional, BSN).

== History ==
In 2010, Antonio "Tonin" Casillas, owner of the Grises de Humacao, decided to give the franchise a makeover and changed the name to Caciques de Humacao. The main reason was to reflect a more positive image on a city which has always been known as the "gray" city. The change also shifted the public opinion on to the Taino heritage of the city and honors the great chieftain Jumacao who fought a rebellion against the Spanish over 500 years ago. In 2017, the team was relocated in the middle of the season to Isabela and became Gallitos de Isabela after the owner of the Caciques, Daniel Maes, was banned from the league. In 2018 owner Rafael Rivera moved his team "Brujos de Guayama" to the town and changed the name of the team to Caciques de Humacao, thus reviving the franchise. In 2019, the franchise was transferred to Guayama, where it became the latest iteration of the Brujos.

== Arena ==
The Caciques' homecourt was the Humacao Arena. The arena finished construction in 2012. The used to play in the older Coliseo Emilio E. Huyke.
