= Cariduros de Fajardo =

Professional basketball team based in Fajardo, Puerto Rico

- League: BSN
- Founded: 1973
- History: Cariduros de Fajardo (1973–1998; 2007–2008; 2017–2020; 2021–2023; 2026-present)
- Arena: Tomás Dones Coliseum
- Location: Fajardo, Puerto Rico
- Team colors
- Team manager: Jorge Otero
- Ownership: Ozuna
- Championships: 0
- Division/conference titles: 0
Home	Away

Cariduros de Fajardo are a professional basketball team of the Baloncesto Superior Nacional (BSN), founded in 1973. Based in Fajardo, Puerto Rico, the team plays at the Tomás Dones Coliseum. On October 30, 2026, the league announced that the team would be replacing the Osos de Manatí.

== History ==
Logo used during the Arroyo relaunch.

The team was founded in 1973 and participated in the Baloncesto Superior Nacional before folding in 1998 due to financial issues. The original franchise featured notable players such as Georgie Torres, Edgar León, Wilson Oquendo, Oscar Fuentes and Daniel Vasallo, as well as coach Julio Toro. The team played at the Evaristo Aponte Sanabria court before moving to the Tomas Dones Coliseum in 1992. Their best season was that same year, when they reached the semifinals for the first time in franchise history before being swept by the eventual finals runners-up, Capitanes de Arecibo. In 1996, Fajardo added rookie Carlos Arroyo, who became a fan favorite before being traded to Santurce. The team folded in 1998.

In 2007, the Titanes de Morovis and owner Marcelino Garcia relocated to Fajardo where the team was renamed Nietos de Marcelino. Taking advantage of a new rule that allowed grandsons of Puerto Ricans to enter the draft, Fajardo drafted Javier Mojica, Jesse Pellot-Rosa and Kevin Hamilton, as well as import player Uka Agbai. With a roster of young players, the team finished in 1st place during the regular season, and then went on to lose against the eventual 2007 champions, Cangrejeros de Santurce, in the semifinals. The team again faced financial issues the following year and dissolved after three years of inactivity, but individual players would go on to see success: Javier Mojica won a championship with Bayamón, Kevin Hamilton won a championship with Mayagüez and Jesse Pellot-Rosa was named league MVP with San Germán.

On January 14, 2017, the team was re-founded for the 2017 season with the purchase of the Atenienses de Manatí franchise by former NBA player Carlos Arroyo and later relocation to his hometown in Fajardo, Puerto Rico.

In May 2021, the team was sold and converted to the Gigantes de Carolina. The following month, the Santeros de Aguada were relocated to Fajardo, where they again play as the Cariduros de Fajardo. In December 2023, it was announced that the team will be relocated back to Aguada and be known by their former name Santeros de Aguada.

On October 30, 2026, the league announced the relocation of the Osos de Manatí franchise to Fajardo, where it would be rebranded as the Cariduros de Fajardo. The move marked the return of the Cariduros to the league following a three-season absence.

== Current roster ==
Cariduros de Fajardo roster
Players
Coaches

Pos.	No.	Nat.	Name	Ht.	Wt.	Age
SG	00	(Puerto Rico)	Sosa, Isaac	6 ft 3 in (1.91 m)		36 – 16 February 1990
SG	1	(Puerto Rico)	Rolon, Tyquan	6 ft 4 in (1.93 m)		31 – 7 March 1995
F	3	(United States) (Puerto Rico)	Sanchez, Ja'Kair	6 ft 8 in (2.03 m)		26 – 15 December 1999
PF	6	(Puerto Rico)	Ortiz, Chris	6 ft 8 in (2.03 m)		33 – 2 April 1993
G/F	7	(Puerto Rico)	Crawford, E. J.	6 ft 6 in (1.98 m)		29 – 14 August 1997
SG	8	(Puerto Rico)	Lugo, Wilmer	6 ft 0 in (1.83 m)		28 – 11 June 1998
G	9	(Puerto Rico)	Santiago, Giovanni	6 ft 1 in (1.85 m)		26 – 4 January 2000
F	10	(United States)	Doolittle, Kristian (I)	6 ft 7 in (2.01 m)		29 – 19 October 1997
PG	21	(Puerto Rico)	Abreu, Alex	5 ft 11 in (1.80 m)		35 – 14 August 1991
PG	22	(United States)	Nelson Jr., Jameer (I)	6 ft 1 in (1.85 m)		25 – 7 August 2001
G/F	24	(Puerto Rico)	Rodríguez, Jonathan	6 ft 5 in (1.96 m)		38 – 3 November 1987
SG	26	(Puerto Rico)	Cintrón, Raymond	6 ft 0 in (1.83 m)		36 – 22 February 1990
F	31	(United States) (Puerto Rico)	Bruesewitz, Mike	6 ft 7 in (2.01 m)		36 – 9 August 1990
C	33	(Mali)	Diallo, Cheick (I)	6 ft 9 in (2.06 m)		30 – 13 September 1996
C	34	(United States) (Puerto Rico)	Davis, Tyler	6 ft 11 in (2.11 m)		29 – 22 May 1997

Head coach

- (Puerto Rico) Iván Ríos

Assistant coach(es)

- (Puerto Rico) Jorge Otero

Legend

- (C) Team captain
- (I) Import player
- Injured

- Roster
Updated: 30 April 2026

=== Depth chart ===
Pos.	Starting 5	Bench 1	Bench 2
C	Cheick Diallo	Tyler Davis	Ja'Kair Sanchez
PF	Chris Ortiz	Mike Bruesewitz	Raymond Cintrón
SF	Kristian Doolittle	Jonathan Rodríguez	Isaac Sosa
SG	Tyquan Rolon	E.J. Crawford	Wilmer Lugo
PG	Jameer Nelson Jr.	Giovanni Santiago	Alex Abreu

== Notable players ==
- (United States) (Puerto Rico) John Holland
- (Puerto Rico) Edgar Leon
- (Puerto Rico) Carlos Arroyo
- (Puerto Rico) Georgie Torres

== Home arenas ==
- Evaristo Aponte Sanabria Coliseum

(1973-1992)

- Tomás Dones Coliseum (1993-1998;

2007-2008; 2017-2020; 2021-2023; 2026- present)|
