= List of acquisitions by AOL =

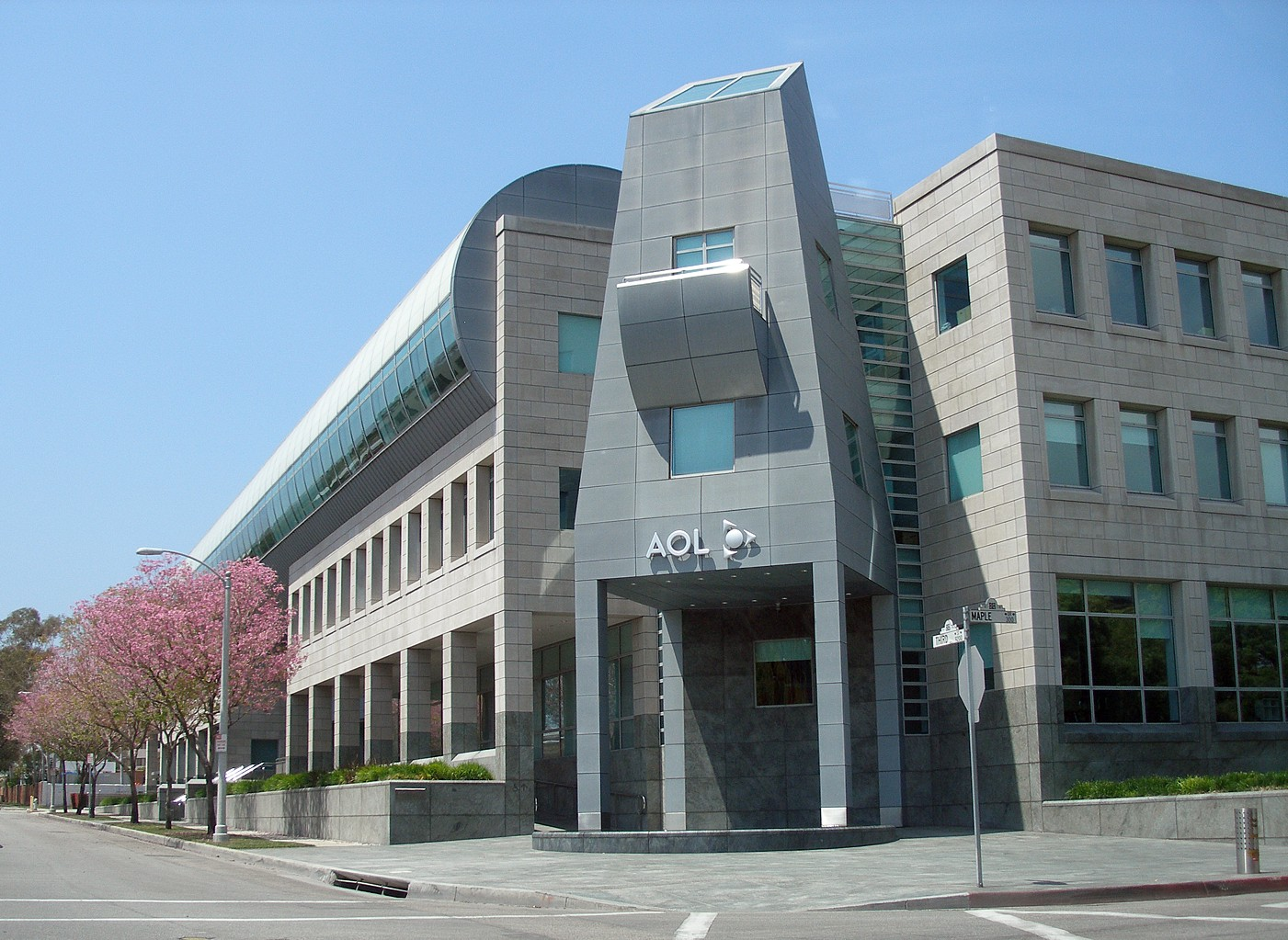
Hospital Online appointment booking OPD registration online appointment booking

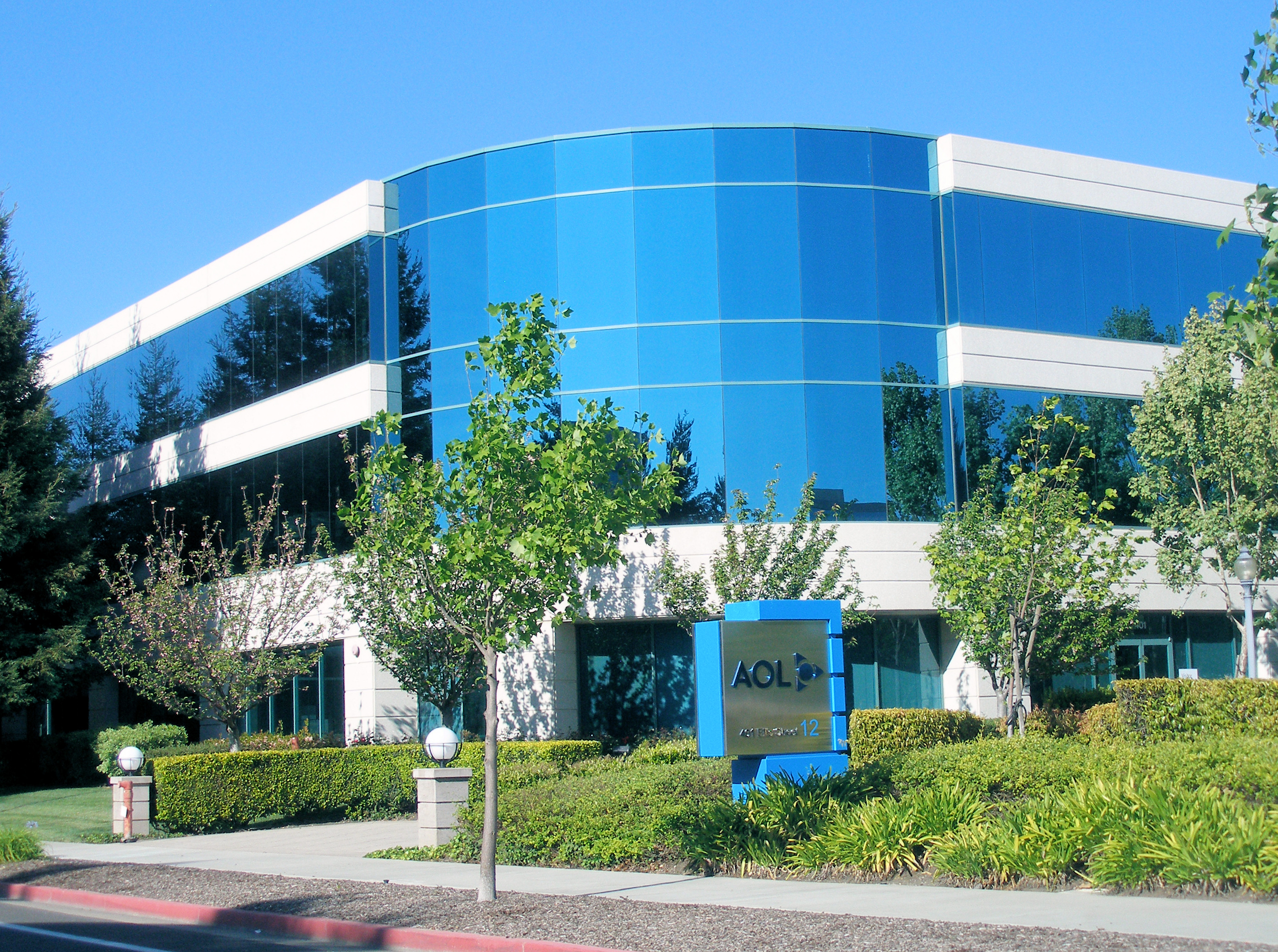
AOL's Silicon Valley branch office

AOL is an internet company founded in 1985 as Quantum Computing Services. Each acquisition is for the respective company in its entirety. The acquisition date listed is the date of the agreement between AOL and the subject of the acquisition. The value of each acquisition is listed in US dollars because AOL is headquartered in the United States. If the value of an acquisition is not listed, then it is undisclosed. As of August 2013, AOL's largest acquisition has been the purchase of Netscape, a web browser company, for US$4.2 billion.

Netscape's browser was dominant, in terms of market share, but it had lost most of its share to Internet Explorer during the first browser war. By the end of 2007, the usage share of Netscape's browsers had fallen from over 90% in the 1990s, to less than 1%. Its second-largest acquisition is the purchase of MapQuest, a web mapping company. From 1999 to 2009, MapQuest had the greatest market share among mapping websites; it has since dropped to second place, behind Google Maps. The majority of the companies acquired by AOL are based in the United States. As of April 2008, AOL has acquired 41 companies. Most of the acquired companies are related to the internet, including several internet service providers and web browsers.

In 2001, AOL merged with Time Warner to become AOL Time Warner. Due to the larger market capitalization of AOL, it gained ascendancy in the merger, with its executives largely displacing Time Warner's despite AOL's far smaller assets and revenues. AOL was spun off as its own independent company from Time Warner in 2009.

Verizon Communications acquired AOL in 2015, and operated it as a separate subsidiary. In 2017, Verizon bought the first Yahoo! Inc. and merged it with AOL, creating the second Yahoo! Inc. The company sold a 90% stake in Yahoo! to Apollo Global Management in 2021, and AOL was placed under Yahoo!’s umbrella.

== Acquisitions ==
Acquisition date	Company	Business	Country	Value (USD)	Adjusted (USD)	Ref.
May 1994	Redgate Communications	Internet service provider	USA	$35,000,000	$76,000,000	
November 1994	BookLink	Web browser	USA	$30,000,000	$65,000,000	
30 November 1994	NaviSoft	Web server	USA	—	—	
February 1995	Advanced Network and Services	Non-Profit	USA	$35,000,000	$74,000,000	
May 1995	Medior	User interface design	USA	—	—	
May 1995	WAIS Inc.	Search engine technology	USA	$15,000,000	$32,000,000	
1 June 1995	WebCrawler	Search engine	USA	—	—	
22 September 1995	Ubique	Virtual places	ISR	$16,981,000	$36,000,000	
1 February 1996	Johnson-Grace	Data compression	USA	—	—	
6 August 1996	ImagiNation Network	Online game	USA	—	—	
25 November 1996	Global Network Navigator	Web browser	USA	—	—	
10 November 1997	CompuServe	Online service	USA	$175,000,000	$351,000,000	
26 January 1998	Personal Library Software	Search engine	USA	—	—	
8 June 1998	Mirabilis	Instant messaging	ISR	$287,000,000	$567,000,000	
24 November 1998	Netscape	Web browser	USA	$4,200,000,000	$8.296×10^{9}	
5 April 1999	When.com	Web-based calendar	USA	$225,000,000	$435,000,000	
27 May 1999	Moviefone	Film database	USA	$525,000,000	$1.015×10^{9}	
1 June 1999	Nullsoft	Media player	USA	$80,000,000	$155,000,000	
1 June 1999	Spinner.com	Media player	USA	$320,000,000	$618,000,000	
October 1999	Gateway.net	Internet service provider	USA	$800,000,000	$155,000,000	
3 December 1999	Tegic	Predictive text	USA	—	—	
22 December 1999	MapQuest	Web mapping	USA	$1,100,000,000	$2.126×10^{9}	
2 September 2000	Quack.com	Voiceportal	USA	$200,000,000	$374,000,000	
5 September 2000	iAmaze	HTML editor	USA	—	—	
11 January 2001	Time Warner	Entertainment	USA	$183,000,000,000	$3.32743×10^{11}	
19 May 2001	InfoInterActive	Telecommunications	CAN	$28,200,000	$51,000,000	
27 July 2001	Obongo	E-Wallet	USA	—	—	
July 2001	eVoice	Telecommunications	USA	—	—	
19 November 2003	Singingfish	Audio/Video search engine	USA	—	—	
24 June 2004	Advertising.com	Online advertising	USA	$435,000,000	$741,000,000	
3 August 2004	MailBlocks	E-mail service provider	USA	—	—	
3 August 2005	Xdrive	Online file storage	USA	—	—	
7 August 2005	Wildseed	Mobile software	USA	—	—	
5 October 2005	Weblogs, Inc.	Weblog network	USA	—	—	
3 November 2005	MusicNow	Online music store	USA	—	—	
10 January 2006	Truveo	Video search engine	USA	—	—	
17 May 2006	Lightningcast	Internet marketing	USA	—	—	
13 August 2006	Userplane	Social network service	USA	—	—	
16 August 2006	GameDaily	Video game journalism	USA	—	—	
8 November 2006	Relegence	Financial services	ISR	—	—	
14 May 2007	Third Screen Media	Mobile advertising	USA	—	—	
15 May 2007	Adtech	Advertising technology provider	DEU	—	—	
23 July 2007	Tacoda	Advertising network	USA	$285,000,000	$443,000,000	
7 November 2007	Yedda	Social Search	ISR	—	—	
7 November 2007	Quigo	Advertising network	USA	—	—	
5 February 2008	buy.at	Affiliate network	USA	—	—	
13 March 2008	Bebo	Social network service	UK	$850,000,000	$1.271×10^{9}	
28 March 2008	Emurse.com	Resume creation & Job hunting site	USA	—	—	
14 April 2008	Sphere	Web search engine	USA	—	—	
15 August 2008	Socialthing	Social Network Aggregator	USA	—	—	
11 June 2009	Patch Media	Local search (Internet)	USA	—	—	
11 June 2009	Going	Local search (Internet)	USA	—	—	
15 July 2009	MMAFighting.com	MMA blog	USA	—	—	
25 January 2010	StudioNow	Internet video	USA	$36,500,000	$54,000,000	
31 August 2010	Rally Up	mobile applications	USA	—	—	
28 September 2010	5Min Media	video syndication	ISR	$65,000,000	$96,000,000	
28 September 2010	TechCrunch	Technology blog	USA	—	—	
28 September 2010	Thing Labs	mobile applications	USA	—	—	
1 December 2010	Unblab	email	USA	—	—	
16 December 2010	Pictela	content marketing	USA	—	—	
20 December 2010	About.me	social networking	USA	—	—	
31 January 2011	GoViral	Online video distribution	DEN	$96,700,000	$138,000,000	
7 February 2011	The Huffington Post	news	USA	$315,000,000	$451,000,000	
4 March 2011	Outside.in	Local / News	USA	—	—	
15 March 2012	Hipster	mobile applications	USA	—	—	
4 December 2012	Buysight	Product Level Retargeting	USA	—	—	
13 February 2013	gdgt	gadget reviews media outlet	USA	—	—	
7 August 2013	Adap.tv	Video advertising	USA	$405,000,000	$560,000,000	
23 January 2014	Gravity	Native advertising	USA	$90,700,000	$123,000,000	
6 May 2014	Convertro	Attribution (marketing)	USA	$101,000,000	$137,000,000	
21 May 2014	Precision Demand	Attribution (marketing)	USA	$405,000,000	$551,000,000	
1 December 2014	Vidible	Video management and exchange platform	USA	$50,000,000	$68,000,000	
March 2015	Velos	Predictive analytics	USA	—	—	
23 October 2015	Millennial Media	Mobile advertising	USA	$238,000,000	$323,000,000	
August 2015	Ashe Avenue	Web Development Group	USA	—	—	
31 August 2015	Kanvas Labs	mobile applications	USA	—	—	
25 January 2016	AlephD	Publisher Analytics	France	—	—	
20 April 2016	RYOT	Immersive Media Company and Virtual Content Studio	USA	—	—	
