= NBA Street =

2001 video game

- North American PlayStation 2 cover art featuring Stretch
- Developers: NuFX; EA Canada
- Publisher: EA Sports BIG
- Producers: Patrick Quinn; Wil Mozell
- Designer: Josh Holmes
- Programmer: Lou Haehn
- Artists: Lisa Clarizio; Daryl Anselmo
- Composer: Jason Ross
- Series: NBA Street
- Platforms: PlayStation 2, GameCube
- Release: PlayStation 2: NA: June 19, 2001; GameCube: NA: February 5, 2002
- Genre: Sports
- Modes: Single-player, multiplayer

NBA Street is a basketball video game developed by NuFX and EA Canada and published by Electronic Arts under the EA Sports BIG label. It was released for the PlayStation 2 on June 19, 2001, and on February 5, 2002, for the GameCube. The game combines the talent and big names of the NBA with the attitude and atmosphere of streetball.

NBA Street is the first installment in the NBA Street series, and was followed by NBA Street Vol. 2, NBA Street V3, and NBA Street Homecourt.

== Gameplay ==
NBA Street is based on three-on-three street basketball. Aside from the basic structure of basketball, players try to collect trick points, which are scored through the use of almost every basketball game maneuver such as doing fancy dribble moves, faking out defenders, shot blocking, diving for the ball, and dunking. If a team fills their trick meter, they get to perform a Gamebreaker, which is a special shot that not only adds to their score, but it subtracts an amount from their opponents' score.

The single player mode "City Circuit" involves making a user-created player, touring famous American locations and picking up teammates from NBA rosters along the way.

The game has "arcade" style gameplay, similar to the NBA Jam series. Games use common streetball scoring, with two-point field goals worth one point and shots made from behind the 3-point line earning two. Instead of a time limit, the first team to score 21 points is deemed the winner. However, the winner must win by 2.

== Cast and characters ==
Twenty-nine NBA teams are playable, with rosters from around 2000 and 2001. However, only 5 players are available from each team. Michael Jordan, who announced his comeback from his second retirement with the Washington Wizards a few months after the PlayStation 2 release, is available on both the GameCube and PlayStation 2 versions. He was however removed as the "Final Challenge" in the GameCube version as he now played for the Washington Wizards in the game. Instead, the City Circuit ended once a player beat the Street Legend "Stretch".

The game introduced several recurring characters called Street Legends, fictional basketball players who served as the series' bosses, each masterful in a particular aspect of basketball and representing a specific area of the United States. Their personalities and appearances were loosely inspired by real players, such as Stretch, the "cover athlete" who resembles Julius Erving in looks and abilities. However, he is not a parody, and the actual Erving appeared as the cover athlete in the sequel game, NBA Street Vol. 2.

== Development ==
With the game being based on a street ball style of basketball, EA invited Vancouver-based streetball group The Notic to do motion capture. The most notable member of the group was Joel Haywood, nicknamed "the King Handles".

== Reception ==
Reception

Aggregate score
Aggregator	Score	
Aggregator	GameCube	PS2
Metacritic	88/100	89/100

Review scores
Publication	Score	
Publication	GameCube	PS2
AllGame	N/A	4/5
Electronic Gaming Monthly	8.17/10 (Note: Two critics of Electronic Gaming Monthly gave the GameCube version each a score of 8/10, and the other gave it 8.5/10.)	8.5/10 (Note: Three critics of Electronic Gaming Monthly gave the PlayStation 2 version each a score of 9.5/10, 7.5/10, and 8.5/10.)
EP Daily	N/A	8.5/10
Famitsu	30/40	31/40
Game Informer	9.25/10	9.25/10
GameRevolution	N/A	B+
GameSpot	8.8/10	9.3/10
GameSpy	90%	91%
GameZone	8/10	N/A
IGN	8.6/10	9.3/10
Next Generation	N/A	4/5
Nintendo Power	4.5/5	N/A
Official U.S. PlayStation Magazine	N/A	5/5
X-Play	N/A	4/5
BBC Sport	N/A	90%
Maxim	N/A	8/10

The game received "favorable" reviews on both platforms according to video game review aggregator Metacritic. Kevin Toyama of NextGen said of the PlayStation 2 version, "Despite a few small problems, NBA Street delivers a basketball experience even sports game cynics can't help but love." In Japan, where the same console version was ported and published by Electronic Arts Victor on August 23, 2001, followed by the GameCube version on March 22, 2002, Famitsu gave it a score of 31 out of 40 for the former, and 30 out of 40 for the latter.

Air Hendrix of GamePro said of the PlayStation 2 version in its August 2001 issue, "When the final buzzer sounds, Street gets serious props for breathing a huge blast of fresh air into what had been Midway's stinky old locker room. Street has staked its claim on the court, easily earning the title of this summer's latest must-have PS2 game." (Note: GamePro gave the PlayStation 2 version two 5/5 scores for graphics and fun factor, 4/5 for sound, and 4.5/5 for control.) Eight issues later, he said that the GameCube version "is sure to be one of this young system's early stars. If you've already conquered the PS2 version, there's no compelling reason to pound this pavement. But if 'GameCube' is your middle name, NBA Street should be your next game." (Note: GamePro gave the GameCube version two 4/5 scores for graphics and sound, 4/5 for control, and 5/5 for fun factor.)

The PlayStation 2 version sold 1.7 million units in the U.S. and earned $57 million by August 2006. Between June 2001 and August 2006, this release was the 18th highest-selling game launched for the PlayStation 2, Xbox or GameCube consoles in the U.S. Combined sales for all NBA Street games released between June 2001 and August 2006, across the three game systems, reached 5.5 million units in the U.S. by the latter date.

The same console version was nominated for the "Best Sports, Alternative Game" award at GameSpot's Best and Worst of 2001 Awards, which went to Tony Hawk's Pro Skater 3. The same console version was also nominated at The Electric Playground's 2001 Blister Awards for "Best Extreme Sports Game" and "Best Canadian Console Game of the Year", but lost both to NHL Hitz 2002.

With the success of the NBA Street series, EA Sports BIG expanded to the format to American football with NFL Street and association football with FIFA Street.
