= Dwight Howard =

American basketball player (born 1985)

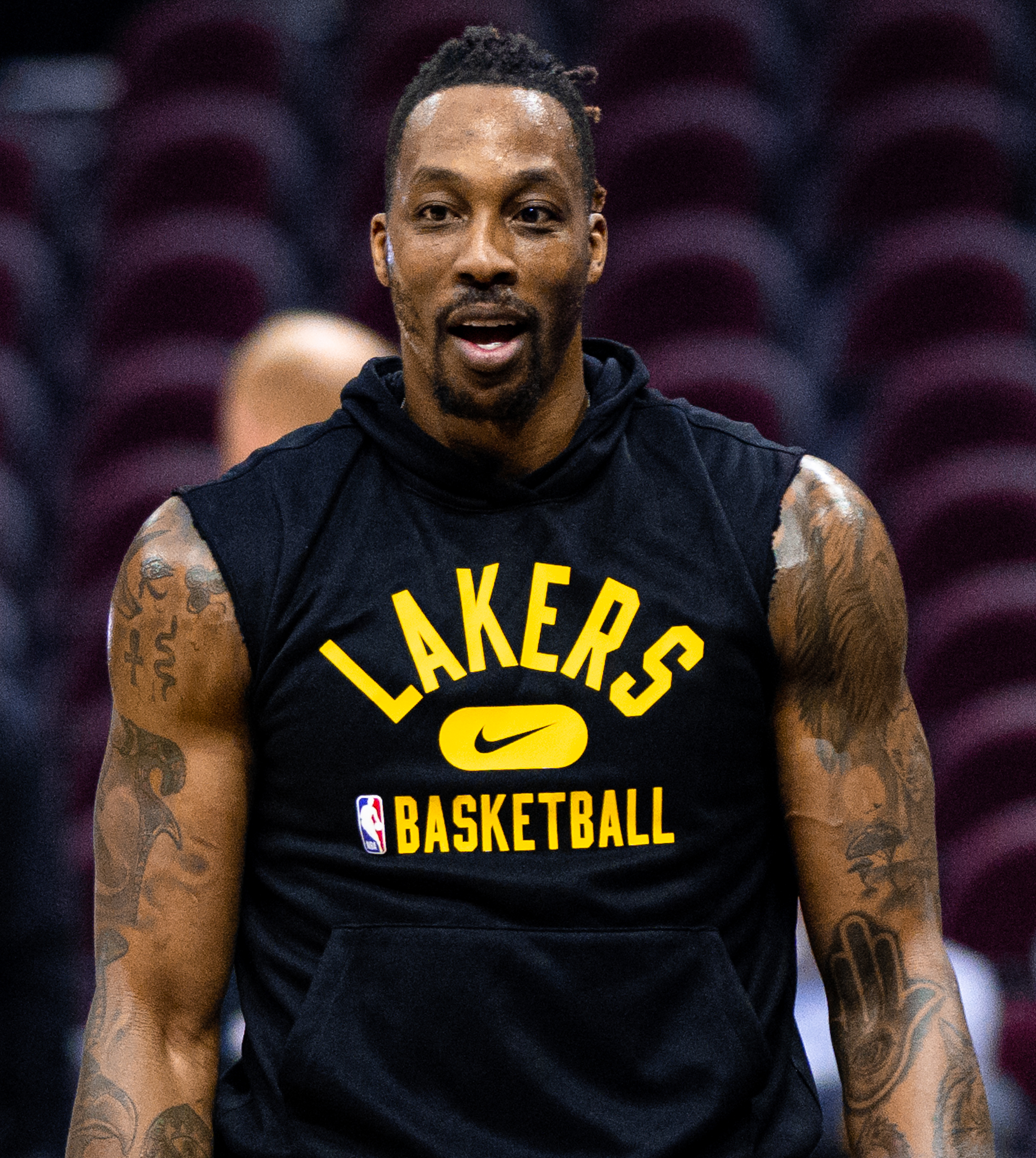
- Howard with the Los Angeles Lakers in 2022

Personal information
- Born: December 8, 1985 (age 40) Atlanta, Georgia, U.S.
- Listed height: 6 ft 10 in (2.08 m)
- Listed weight: 265 lb (120 kg)

Career information
- High school: Southwest Atlanta Christian Academy (Atlanta, Georgia)
- NBA draft: 2004: 1st round, 1st overall pick
- Drafted by: Orlando Magic
- Playing career: 2004–2026
- Position: Center
- Number: 12, 8, 21, 39

Career history
- 2004–2012: Orlando Magic
- 2012–2013: Los Angeles Lakers
- 2013–2016: Houston Rockets
- 2016–2017: Atlanta Hawks
- 2017–2018: Charlotte Hornets
- 2018–2019: Washington Wizards
- 2019–2020: Los Angeles Lakers
- 2020–2021: Philadelphia 76ers
- 2021–2022: Los Angeles Lakers
- 2022–2023: Taoyuan Leopards
- 2026: Black Fortress Tbilisi

Career highlights
- NBA champion (2020); 8× NBA All-Star (2007–2014); 5× All-NBA First Team (2008–2012); All-NBA Second Team (2014); 2× All-NBA Third Team (2007, 2013); 3× NBA Defensive Player of the Year (2009–2011); 4× NBA All-Defensive First Team (2009–2012); NBA All-Defensive Second Team (2008); NBA All-Rookie First Team (2005); 5× NBA rebounding leader (2008–2010, 2012, 2013); 2× NBA blocks leader (2009, 2010); NBA Slam Dunk Contest champion (2008); T1 League Most Valuable Import (2023); All-T1 League First Team (2023); T1 League All-Defensive First Team (2023); T1 League rebounding leader (2023); T1 League All-Star (2023); T1 League All-Star Game Most Famous Player (2023); T1 League All-Star Game MVP (2023); National high school player of the year (2004); McDonald's All-American Game Co-MVP (2004); First-team Parade All-American (2004); Mr. Georgia Basketball (2004)

Career NBA statistics
- Points: 19,485 (15.7 ppg)
- Rebounds: 14,627 (11.8 rpg)
- Blocks: 2,228 (1.8 bpg)
- Stats at NBA.com
- Stats at Basketball Reference
- Basketball Hall of Fame
Medals
Men's basketball
Representing the United States
Olympic Games
Gold medal – first place	2008 Beijing	Team competition
FIBA World Championship
Bronze medal – third place	2006 Japan	Team competition
FIBA Americas Championship
Gold medal – first place	2007 Las Vegas	Team competition

Dwight David Howard II (born December 8, 1985) is an American former professional basketball player who played 18 seasons in the National Basketball Association (NBA). Nicknamed "Superman" for his athletic prowess, he is an NBA champion, eight-time All-Star, eight-time All-NBA Team honoree, five-time All-Defensive Team member, and three-time Defensive Player of the Year. He was elected twice to the Basketball Hall of Fame, as an individual player and as a member of the Redeem Team, and is regarded as one of the greatest defensive players of all time.

Howard, who played the center position, spent his high school career at Southwest Atlanta Christian Academy. He chose to forgo college, entered the 2004 NBA draft, and was selected first overall by the Orlando Magic. Howard set numerous franchise and league records with the Magic and led the team to the 2009 NBA Finals. In 2012, after eight seasons with Orlando, Howard was traded to the Los Angeles Lakers, with whom he spent three separate one-year stints and won an NBA championship in 2020. He has also played for the Houston Rockets, the Atlanta Hawks, the Charlotte Hornets, the Washington Wizards, and the Philadelphia 76ers.

After the 2021–22 NBA season, Howard moved overseas and signed with the Taoyuan Leopards of the T1 League. In his lone season with the team, he was named a T1 All-Star.

== Early life, family and youth education ==
Howard was born in Atlanta, Georgia, to Dwight Sr. and Sheryl Howard. The family has a strong history of athletics. Dwight Sr., a Georgia State Trooper, is the athletic director at Southwest Atlanta Christian Academy, a private academy with one of the country's best high school basketball programs. Sheryl played on the inaugural women's basketball team at Morris Brown College. Howard's mother had seven miscarriages before he was born. A devout Christian since his youth, Howard became serious about basketball around the age of nine. Despite his large frame, Howard was quick and versatile enough to play the guard position. He attended Southwest Atlanta Christian Academy and played mostly as power forward, averaging 16.6 points, 13.4 rebounds and 6.3 blocks per game in 129 appearances. As a senior, Howard led his team to a 31–2 record and the 2004 state title, while averaging 25 points, 18 rebounds, 8.1 blocks and 3.5 assists per game. The same year, he was widely recognized as the best American high school basketball player, and received the Naismith Prep Player of the Year Award, the Morgan Wootten High School Player of the Year Award, Gatorade National Player of the Year and the McDonald's National High School Player of the Year honor. He was also co-MVP (with J. R. Smith) of the McDonald's All-American Game that year. On January 31, 2012, Howard was honored as one of the 35 greatest McDonald's All-Americans.

== Professional career ==
=== Orlando Magic (2004–2012) ===
==== Early years (2004–2008) ====
Following his high school successes, Howard chose to forego college and declared for the 2004 NBA draft—a decision partly inspired by his idol Kevin Garnett who had done the same in 1995—where the Orlando Magic selected him first overall over UConn junior Emeka Okafor. He took the number 12 for his jersey, in part because it was the reverse of Garnett's 21 when he played for Minnesota. Howard joined a depleted Magic squad that had finished with only 21 victories the previous season; further, the club had just lost perennial NBA All-Star Tracy McGrady. Howard, however, made an immediate impact. He finished his rookie season with an average of 12 points and 10 rebounds, setting several NBA records in the process. He became the youngest player in NBA history to average a double double in the regular season. He also became the youngest player in NBA history to average at least 10 rebounds in a season and youngest NBA player ever to record at least 20 rebounds in a game. Howard's importance to the Magic was highlighted when he became the first player in NBA history directly out of high school to start all 82 games during his rookie season. For his efforts, he was selected to play in the 2005 NBA Rookie Challenge, and was unanimously selected to the All-Rookie Team. He also finished third in the Rookie of the Year voting.

Howard reported to camp for his second NBA season having added 20 pounds of muscle during the off-season. Orlando coach Brian Hill—responsible for grooming former Magic superstar Shaquille O'Neal—decided that Howard should be converted into a full-fledged center. Hill identified two areas where Howard needed to improve: his post-up game and his defense. He exerted extra pressure on Howard, saying that the Magic would need him to emerge as a force in the middle before the team had a chance at the playoffs. On November 15, 2005, in a home game against the Charlotte Bobcats, Howard recorded 21 points and 20 rebounds, becoming the youngest player ever to score 20 or more points and gather 20 or more rebounds in the same game. He was selected to play on the Sophomore Team in the 2006 Rookie Challenge during the All-Star break. Overall, he averaged 15.8 points and 12.5 rebounds per game, ranking second in the NBA in rebounds per game, offensive rebounds, and double-doubles and sixth in field goal percentage. Despite Howard's improvement, the Magic finished the season with a 36–46 record and failed to qualify for the playoffs for the second consecutive season since Howard's arrival.

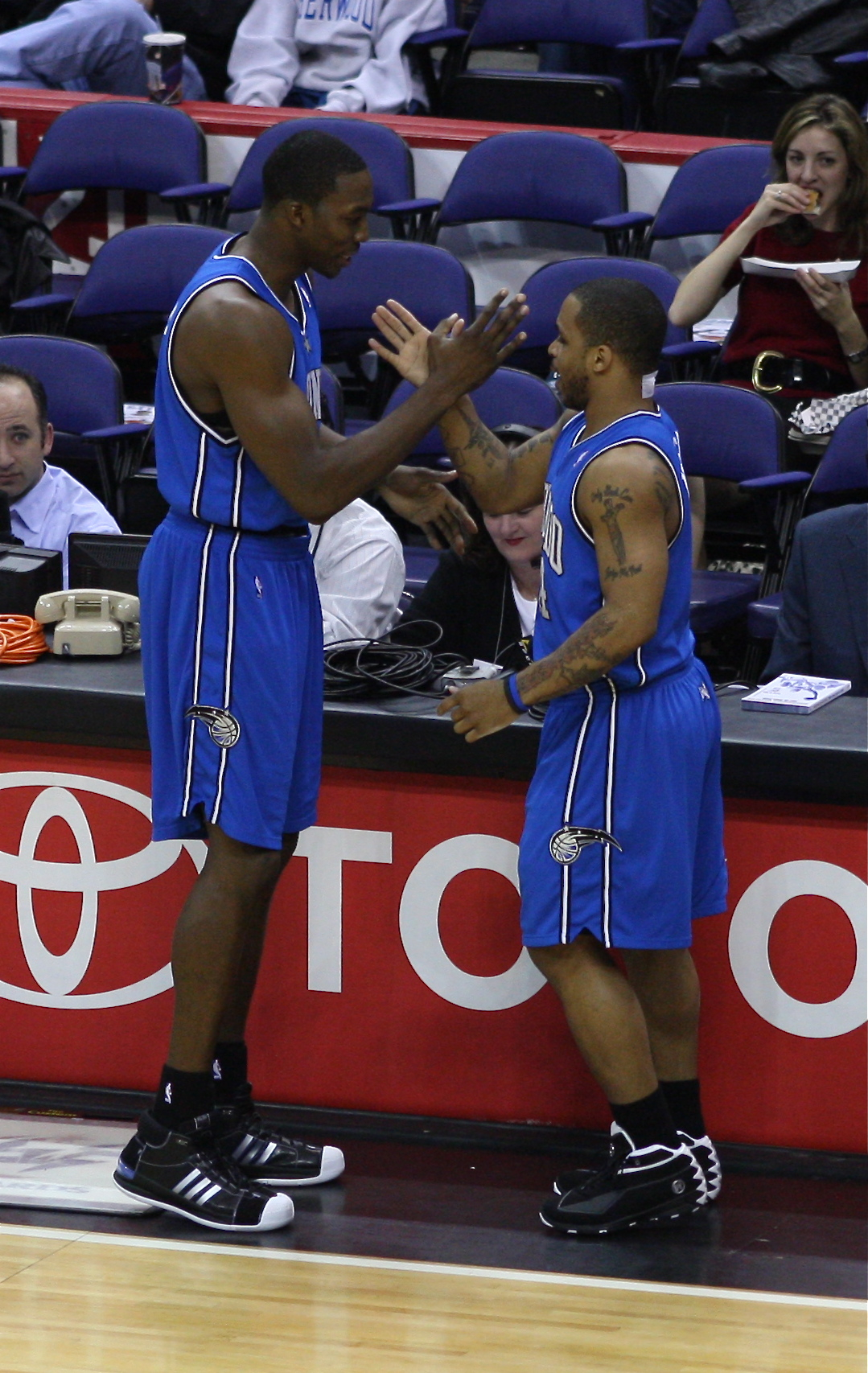
Howard and Jameer Nelson in 2008

In the 2006–07 season (and for the third consecutive season), Howard played in all 82 regular-season games. On February 1, 2007, he received his first NBA All-Star selection as a reserve on the Eastern Conference squad for the 2007 NBA All-Star Game. On February 9, he made a game-winning alley-oop off an inbound pass at the buzzer against the San Antonio Spurs. Howard set a new career high with 35 points against the Philadelphia 76ers on April 14. Under his leadership, the Magic qualified for the 2007 NBA Playoffs as the eighth seed in the Eastern Conference. There, the Magic were swept by the Detroit Pistons in the first round. For the season, Howard averaged 17.6 points and 12.3 rebounds per game, finishing first in the NBA in total rebounds, second in field goal percentage, and ninth in blocks. He was named to the All-NBA Third Team at the end of the 2006–07 campaign. Following his breakout campaign, Howard signed a five-year, $80 million extension that would keep him in Orlando through the 2012–13 season.

Howard continued posting impressive numbers in the 2007–08 season and helped the Magic have their best season to date. Howard was named as a starter for the Eastern Conference All-Star team. On February 16, 2008, he won the NBA Slam Dunk Contest by receiving 78% of the fan's votes via text messaging or online voting; in that contest, he performed a series of innovative dunks said to have rejuvenated the contest, including donning a Superman cape for one of the dunks. Howard led the Magic to their first division title in 12 years and to the third seed for the 2008 NBA Playoffs. In their first round match-up against the Toronto Raptors, Howard's dominance (three 20-point/20-rebound games) helped Orlando to prevail in five games. Howard's series total of 91 rebounds was also greater than the total rebounds collected by the entire Toronto frontcourt. In the second round against the Pistons, the Magic lost in five games. For the season, Howard was named to the All-NBA First Team for the first time, and was also named to the NBA All-Defensive Second Team.

==== Dominance and NBA Finals appearance (2008–2011) ====
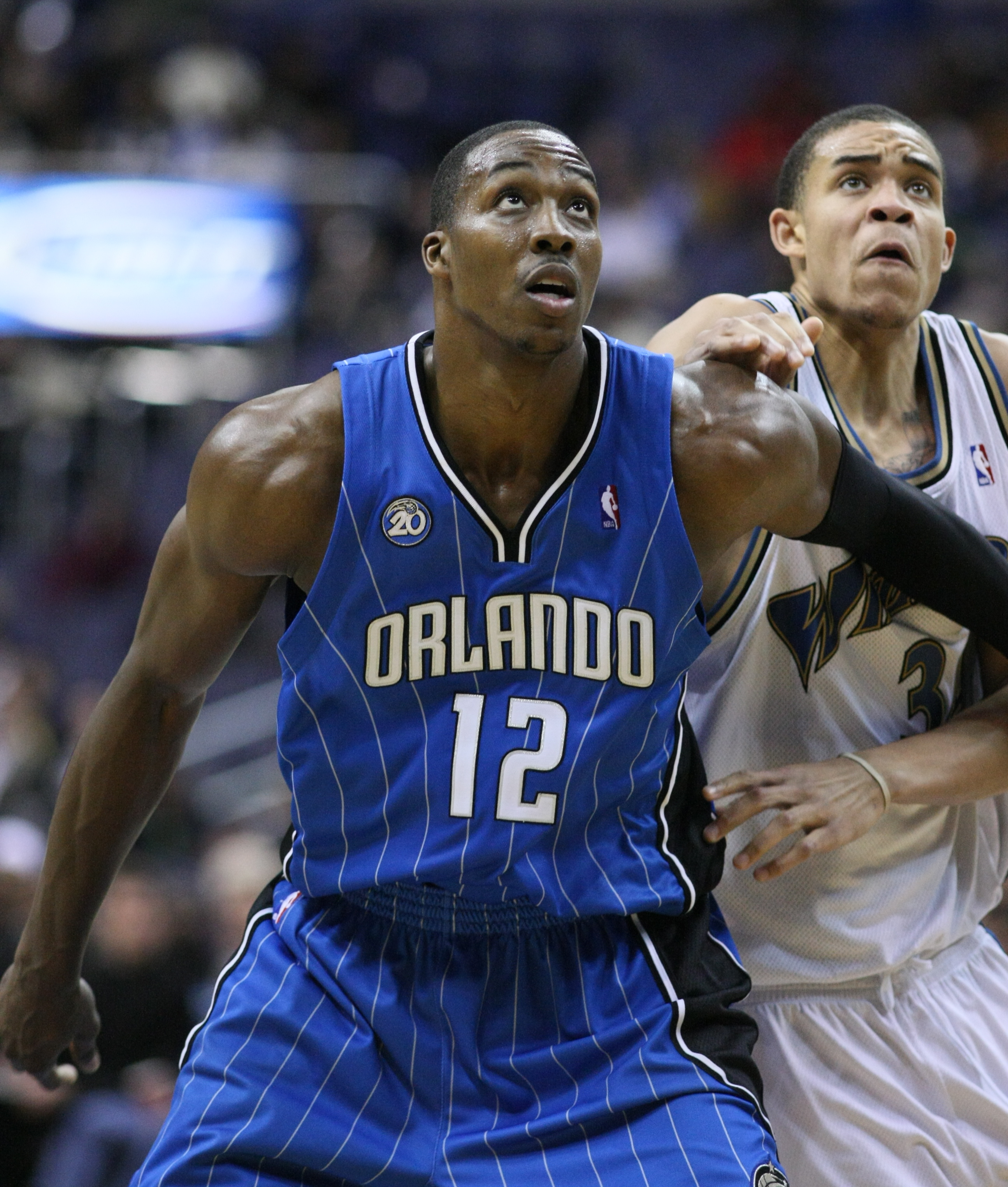
Howard in 2008, boxing out JaVale McGee of the Washington Wizards

The 2008–09 season began well for Howard. Ten games into the season, the center was leading the league in blocks per game (4.2). In December, Howard injured his left knee, which caused him to miss a game due to injury for the first time in his NBA career; previously, he had played in 351 consecutive games. He garnered a record 3.1 million votes to earn the starting berth on the Eastern Conference team for the 2009 NBA All-Star Game. Howard led Orlando to its second straight Southeast Division title and to the third seed for the 2009 NBA Playoffs; the team finished the season with a 59–23 record. In the first round of the playoffs against the 76ers, Howard recorded 24 points and 24 rebounds in Game 5 to give Orlando a 3–2 lead before the Magic closed out the series in six games. In the second round against the Boston Celtics, after the Magic blew a lead in Game 5 to fall behind 3–2 in the series, Howard publicly stated that he should have been given the ball more and questioned coach Stan Van Gundy's tactics. The Magic went on to defeat Boston to win the series and move on to the Eastern Conference Finals. There, they defeated the Cleveland Cavaliers 4–2. Howard had a playoff career-high 40 points to go with his 14 rebounds in the deciding Game 6, leading Orlando to the NBA Finals for the first time in 14 years. In the NBA Finals, the Los Angeles Lakers took the first two home games, before a home win by the Magic brought the deficit to 2–1. In Game 4, despite Howard putting up 21 rebounds and a Finals record of 9 blocks in a game, the Magic lost in overtime. The Lakers went on to clinch the series with a win in Game 5. For the season, Howard became the youngest player ever to win the NBA Defensive Player of the Year Award. He was also named to the NBA All-Defensive First Team, and to the All-NBA First Team.

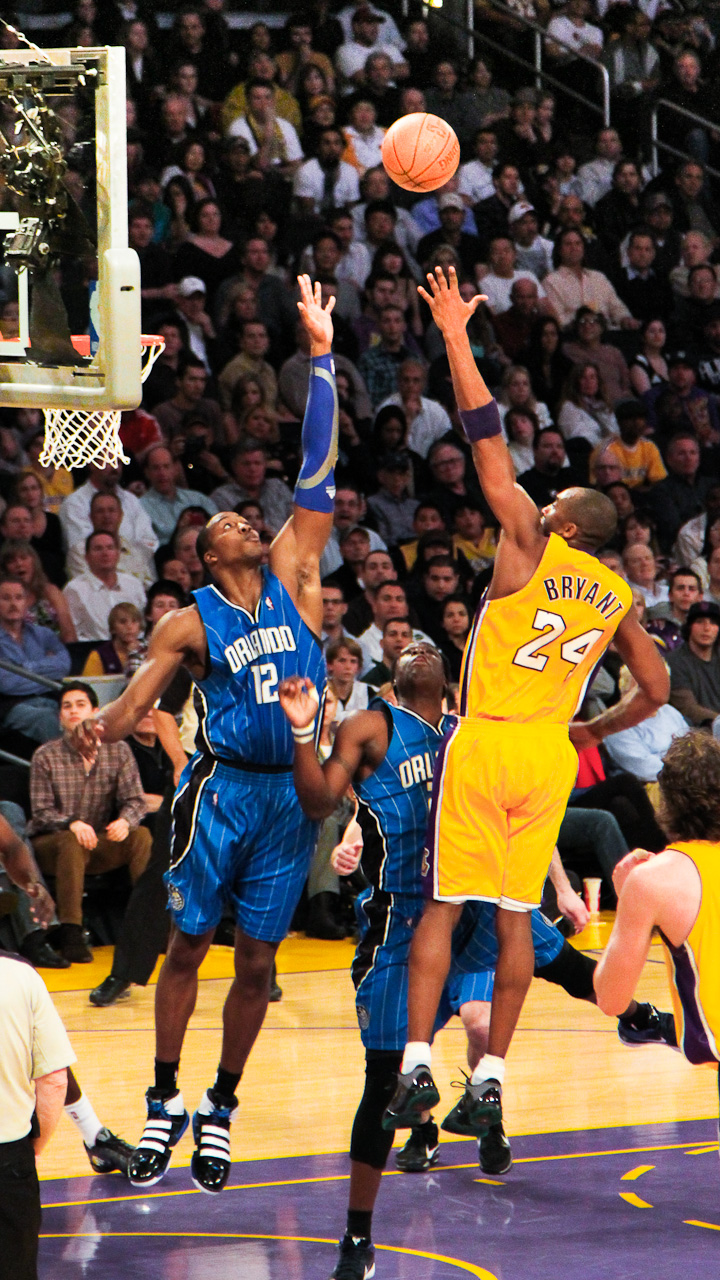
Howard in 2010, contesting a shot by future teammate Kobe Bryant of the Los Angeles Lakers

In the 2009–10 season, the Magic got off to a strong start, winning 17 of their first 21 games and setting a franchise record. On January 21, 2010, Howard was named as the starting center for the East in the 2010 NBA All-Star Game. The Magic completed the regular season with 59 wins and their third consecutive division title. The Magic's playoff run resulted in another Eastern Conference Finals appearance, where they lost in six games to the Celtics. Howard won the Defensive Player of the Year Award for the second straight year. He became the first player in NBA history to lead the league in blocks and rebounds in the same season twice—and for two years in a row.

In the 2010–11 season, Howard posted career highs in points and field goal percentage. He became the first player in league history to win Defensive Player of the Year honors for three consecutive seasons. Howard led the league in double-doubles and also averaged 14.1 rebounds, 2.3 blocks and a career-high 1.3 steals this season. He led the Magic to 52 wins, as they finished as the fourth seed in the Eastern Conference. They went on to lose to the Atlanta Hawks in the first round of 2011 NBA Playoffs. He had a playoff career-high 46 points and 19 rebounds in Orlando's 103–93 loss to Atlanta in Game 1. Howard led the NBA in technical fouls with 18 in the regular season, and received one-game suspensions after his 16th and 18th technicals. He also led the NBA in dunks for six consecutive seasons, from 2005-06 to 2010-2011, with a high of 269 dunks in the 2007-2008 season

==== Final season in Orlando (2011–2012) ====
Due to a lockout, the 2011–12 regular season was shortened to 66 games. Not long after the lockout ended, Howard, who was eligible to become a free agent at the end of the season, demanded a trade to the New Jersey Nets, Los Angeles Lakers or Dallas Mavericks. Howard stated that although his preference was to remain in Orlando, he did not feel the Magic organization was doing enough to build a championship contender. He would later meet with Magic officials and agree to back off his trade demands, but stated that he also felt the team needed to make changes to the roster if they wanted to contend for a championship.

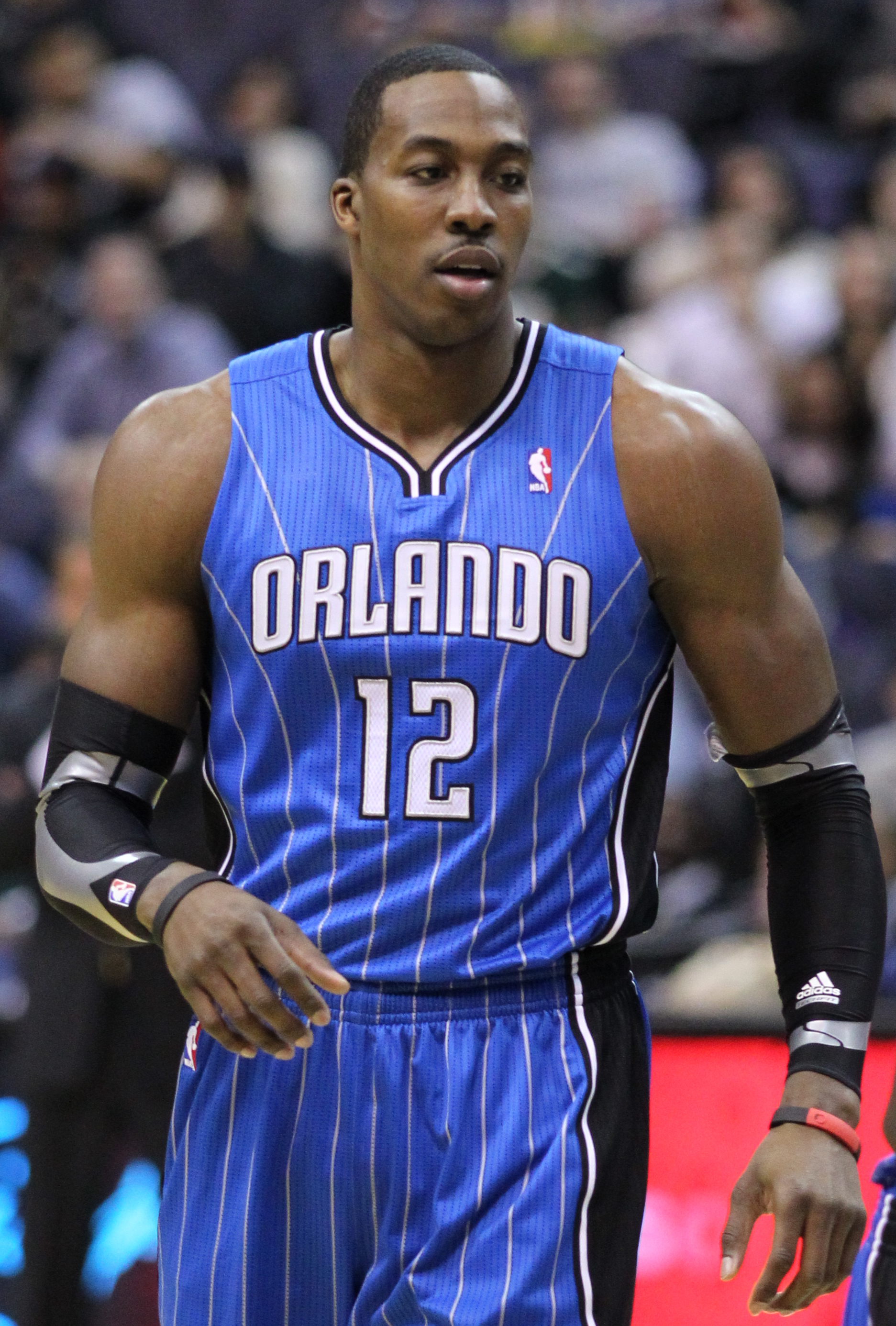
Dwight Howard with the Magic in 2011

On January 12, 2012, Howard attempted an NBA regular season record 39 free throws against the Golden State Warriors. Howard entered the game making 42 percent of his free throws for the season and just below 60 percent for his career. The Warriors hacked Howard intentionally throughout the game, and he broke Wilt Chamberlain's regular-season record of 34 set in 1962. Howard made 21 of the 39 attempts, finishing with 45 points and 23 rebounds in the Magic's 117–109 victory. On January 24, 2012, Howard became the Magic's all-time scoring leader.

On March 15, 2012, on the day of the trading deadline for the 2011–12 NBA season, Howard waived his right to opt out of his contract at the end of the season and committed to stay with the Magic through the 2012–13 season. He had previously asked to be traded to the New Jersey Nets. Had he not signed the amendment, the Magic were prepared to trade him to avoid losing him as a free agent. On April 5, Van Gundy said that he had been informed by management that Howard wanted him fired. During the interview, the center walked up and hugged his coach, unaware that Van Gundy had confirmed a report that Howard denied. Van Gundy was let go after the season.

On April 19, 2012, Howard's agent said that Howard would undergo surgery to repair a herniated disk in his back and would miss the rest of the 2011–12 season, as well as the 2012 Summer Olympics in London. During the offseason, Howard again requested a trade to the Nets, who had relocated to Brooklyn. He intended to become a free agent at the end of the 2012–13 season if he was not traded to Brooklyn.

=== Los Angeles Lakers (2012–2013) ===
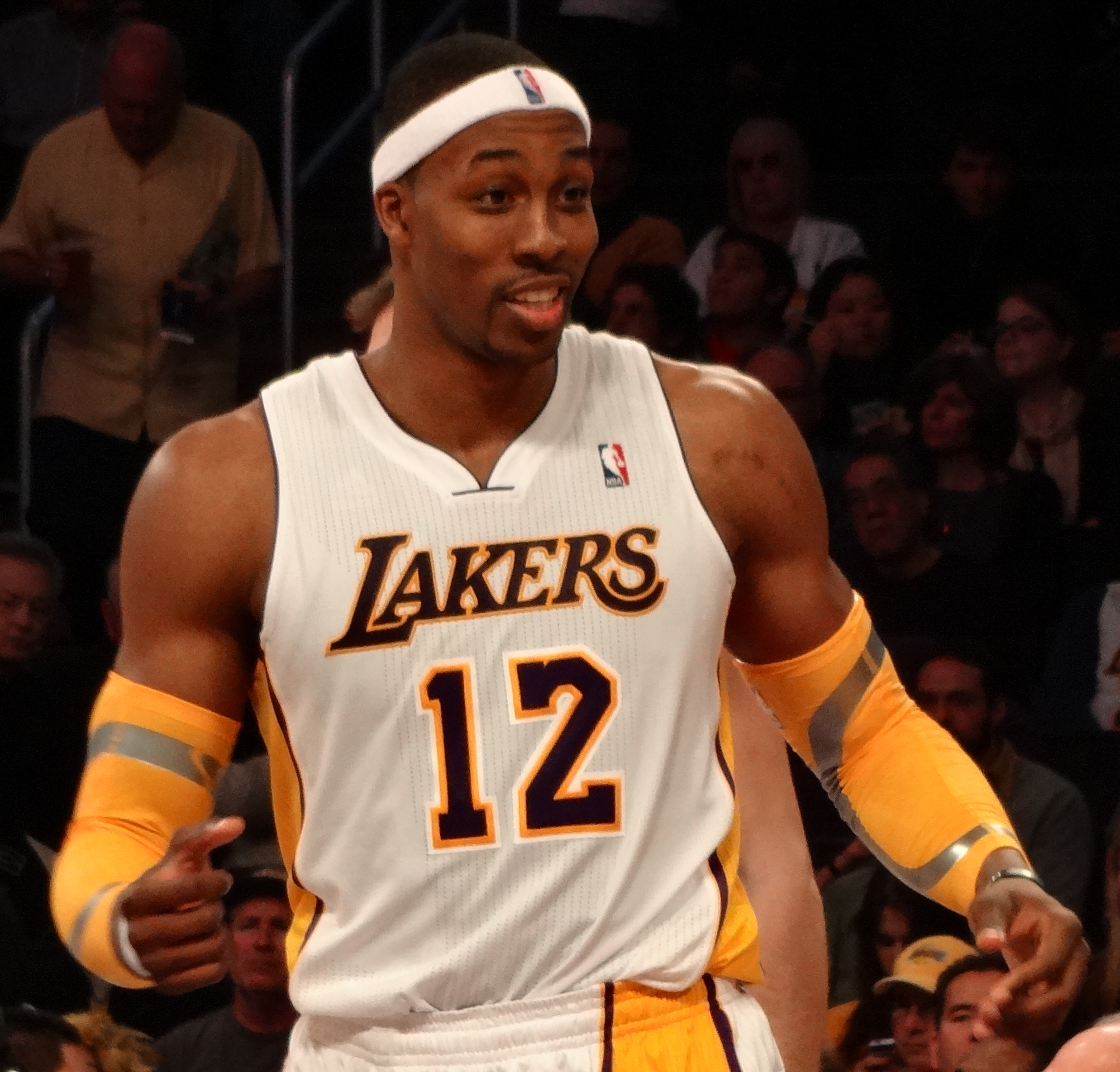
Howard with the Lakers in 2013

On August 10, 2012, Howard was traded from Orlando to the Los Angeles Lakers in a deal that also involved the Philadelphia 76ers and the Denver Nuggets, sending Arron Afflalo, Josh McRoberts, Al Harrington, Nikola Vučević, Maurice Harkless, Christian Eyenga, three first-round draft picks, and two second-round draft picks to the Magic. Howard took six months off from basketball after his April back surgery, and only had the combined four weeks of training camp and preseason to prepare for the season. Still working himself into shape, Howard paced himself throughout the season on both offense and defense. On January 4, 2013, Howard injured his right shoulder in the second half of the Lakers' 107–102 loss to the Los Angeles Clippers. At the midpoint of the season, the Lakers were a disappointing 17–24. Howard was averaging 17.1 points on 58.2% shooting, 12.3 rebounds, and 2.5 blocks, but also 3.6 fouls a game with 3.2 turnovers while making only 50.4% of his free throws.

Howard was upset that he was not getting the ball enough, and he felt that Kobe Bryant was shooting too much. Moving forward, Howard said he needed to "bring it" and dominate in more ways than just scoring. Howard missed games due to his recurring shoulder injury in January and February. In February, Bryant said that Howard "worries too much" and "doesn't want to let anyone down", urging him to play through the pain when Pau Gasol was sidelined with a torn plantar fascia. Howard returned the next game after commenting that Bryant was "not a doctor, I'm not a doctor. That's his opinion." During this first part of the 2012–13 NBA season, It

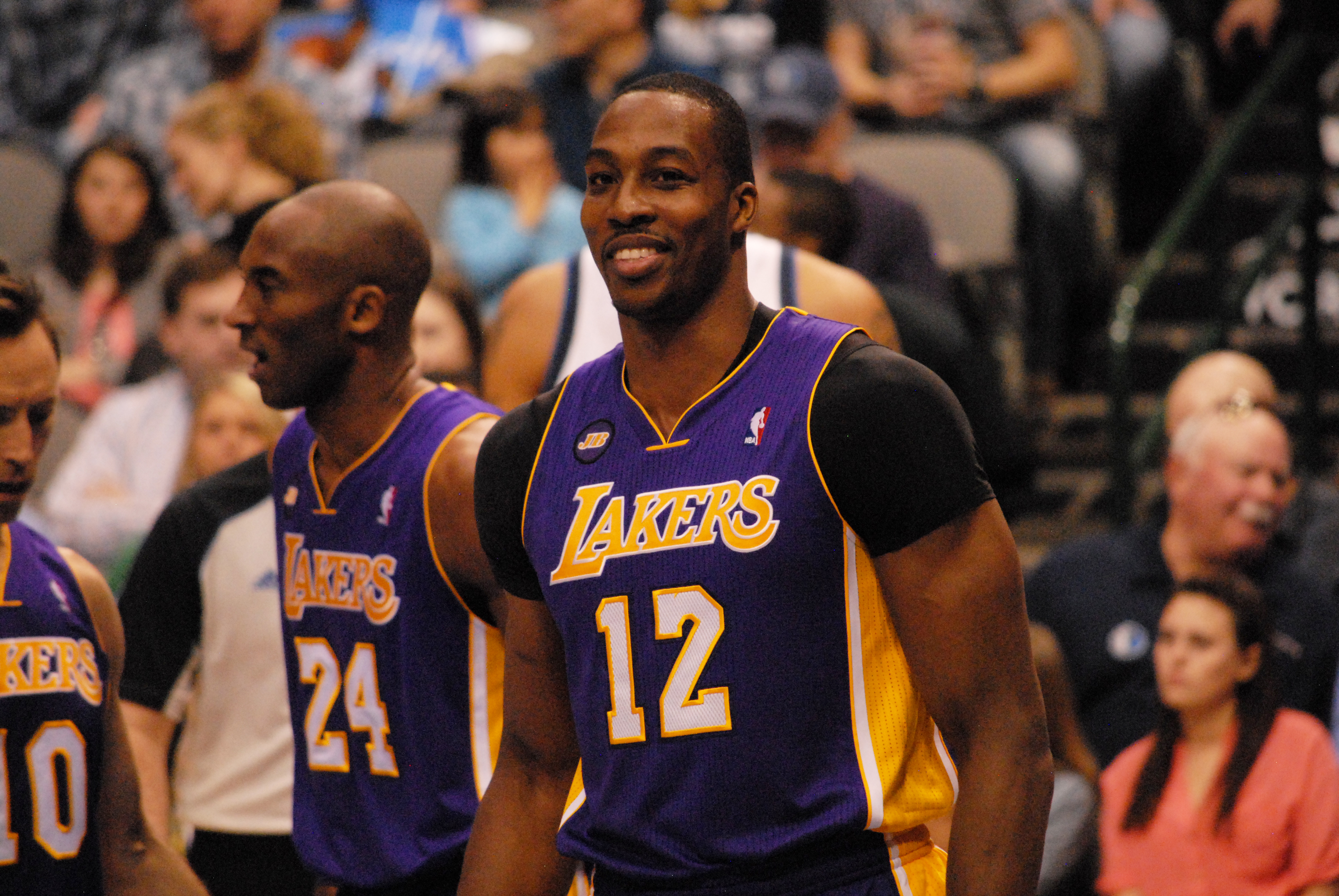
Howard with the Lakers in 2013

During the All-Star break, Howard adopted a healthier diet to get into better shape to anchor the Lakers' defense and run head coach Mike D'Antoni's preferred pick and rolls. Still, on February 23, Howard said he was "not even close" to physically being where he wanted to be. D'Antoni attributed Howard's difficulty running the pick-and-roll—a play the coach had expected would be a staple for the team—with Steve Nash to Howard's lack of conditioning. The Lakers were 8–2 after the All-Star break, passing Utah for the eighth and final playoff spot in the Western Conference, and Howard averaged 15.5 points, 14.8 rebounds, and 2.6 blocks. In his first game back in Orlando on March 12, Howard scored a season-high 39 points and had 16 rebounds in a 106–97 Lakers win. Booed throughout the game, he made 25 of 39 free throws, setting franchise records for free throws made and attempted while tying his own NBA record for attempts. (Note: The previous Lakers records were held by Bryant, who made 23 twice—most recently in 2006 against New York—while Shaquille O'Neal attempted 31 in 1999 against Chicago.) Howard made 16 of 20 free throws when he was fouled intentionally by the Magic. With Howard anchoring the Lakers defense and his improved overall play, the Lakers made the playoffs, but were swept in the opening round by San Antonio. Howard was ejected in Game 4 with over nine minutes left in the third quarter.

Howard finished the season with his lowest scoring average since his second year in the NBA, but he was the league leader in rebounding and ranked second in field goal percentage. Although he was recovering from his back surgery, he only missed six games all season—all due to his torn labrum. Howard was named to the All-NBA Third Team after having received five consecutive first-team honors. He became a free agent in the summer, and he was offered a maximum contract of five years and $118 million by the Lakers.

=== Houston Rockets (2013–2016) ===
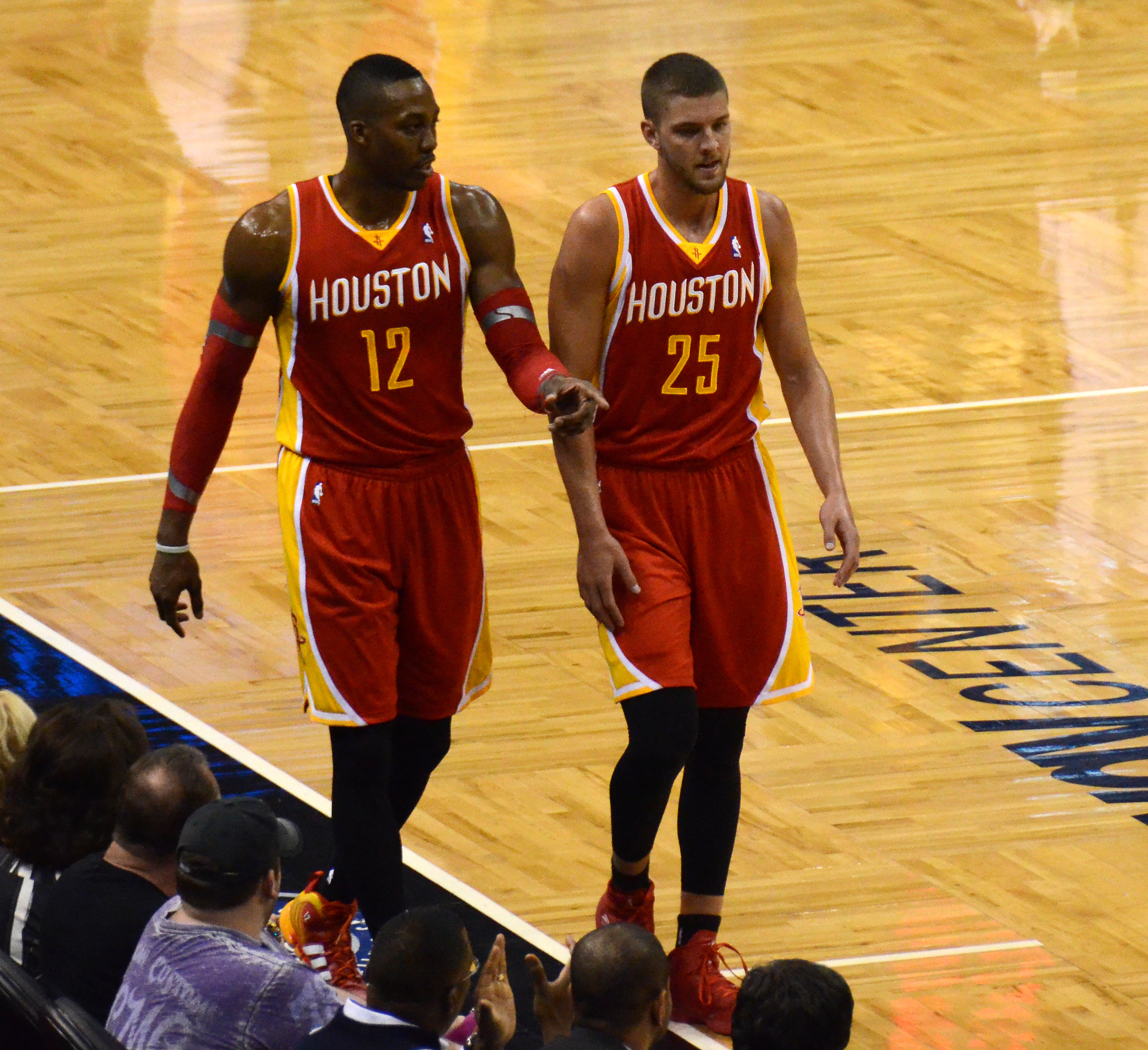
Howard with the Rockets in 2014, alongside teammate Chandler Parsons

On July 13, 2013, Howard signed with the Houston Rockets on a four-year, $88 million contract, joining James Harden to form a formidable duo. Howard finished the regular season with averages of 18.3 points and 12.2 rebounds and earned All-NBA Second Team honors. During the 2014 playoffs, Howard averaged 26 points and 13.7 rebounds per game, but the Rockets were eliminated by the Portland Trail Blazers in the first round, losing the series 4–2.

After playing in the Rockets' first 10 out of 11 games to start the 2014–15 season, Howard missed 11 straight due to a strained right knee before returning to action on December 13 against the Denver Nuggets and recording his 10,000th career rebound. However, on January 31, Howard was ruled out for a further month due to persistent trouble with his right knee. After setbacks forced him out for a further month and a total of 26 games, Howard returned to action on March 25 against the New Orleans Pelicans. He started the game but was held under 17 minutes by coach Kevin McHale and finished with just four points and seven rebounds in a 95–93 win. Howard played only 41 games in the regular season. The Rockets clinched their first division title in over 20 years and made it to the Western Conference Finals, where they lost 4–1 to the Golden State Warriors.

On November 4, 2015, Howard had 23 points and 14 rebounds against the Orlando Magic. He shot 10-of-10 to become the first Rocket to make 10 or more field goals without a miss since Yao Ming went 12-of-12 in 2009. On December 26, he eclipsed 15,000 points for his career in a loss to the New Orleans Pelicans. On January 18, 2016, in an overtime loss to the Los Angeles Clippers, Howard had 36 points and tied a career high with 26 rebounds en route to his 10th straight double-double, the league's longest active streak at the time, and his longest since a 14-game run in 2012–13. On June 22, 2016, Howard declined his $23 million player option for the 2016–17 season and became an unrestricted free agent.

=== Atlanta Hawks (2016–2017) ===
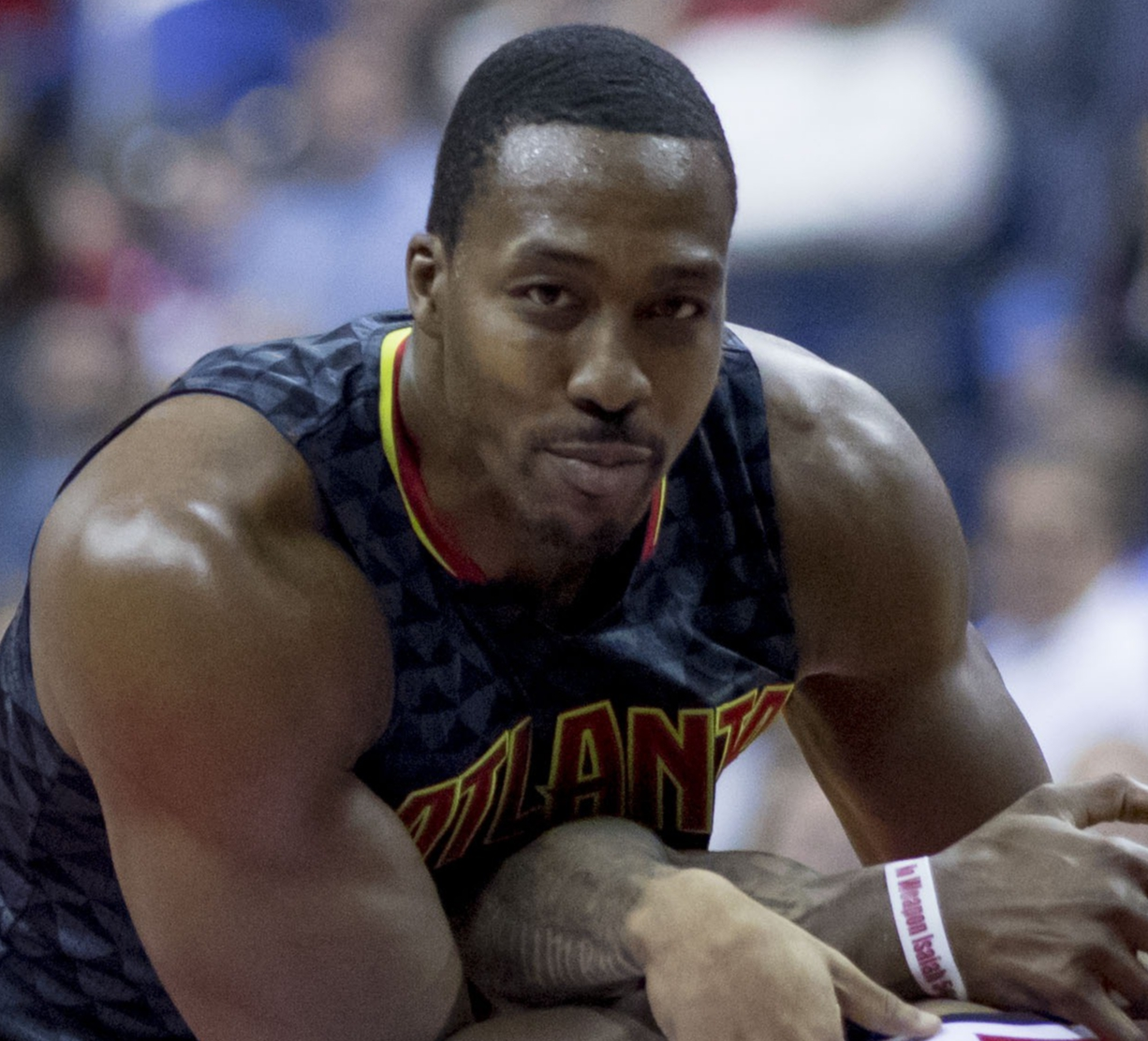
Howard with the Hawks in 2017

On July 12, 2016, Howard signed a three-year, $70 million contract with his hometown team the Atlanta Hawks. With the retirement of Tim Duncan, Howard entered the 2016–17 season as the NBA's active leader in rebounds (12,089) and blocked shots (1,916). In his debut for the Hawks in their season opener on October 27, Howard grabbed 19 rebounds in a 114–99 win over the Washington Wizards. It was the most rebounds for anyone in their Atlanta debut, breaking the mark of 18 that Shareef Abdur-Rahim set on October 30, 2001. On November 2, he scored a season-high 31 points in a 123–116 loss to the Los Angeles Lakers. On February 2, he had a season-best game with 24 points and 23 rebounds in a 113–108 win over the Rockets in Houston.

=== Charlotte Hornets (2017–2018) ===
On June 20, 2017, the Hawks traded Howard, along with the 31st overall pick in the 2017 NBA draft, to the Charlotte Hornets in exchange for Marco Belinelli, Miles Plumlee and the 41st overall pick in the 2017 NBA draft. To begin the season, Howard became the first Charlotte player since Emeka Okafor in 2007 with four consecutive 15-rebound games. In the fifth game of the season, he had another 15-rebound game. On March 15, he scored 20 of his season-high 33 points in the second half of the Hornets' 129–117 win over the Atlanta Hawks. On March 21, Howard recorded 32 points and a franchise-record 30 rebounds in a 111–105 win over the Nets, becoming just the eighth player in league history with a 30–30 game. He became the first NBA player with a 30-point, 30-rebound game since Kevin Love in November 2010, and the first player with a 30–30 game against the Nets since Kareem Abdul-Jabbar in February 1978. The next day, Howard was suspended for one game without pay due to receiving his 16th technical foul of the season. Howard finished the season with a franchise-record 53 double-doubles and joined Abdul-Jabbar and Wilt Chamberlain as the only players to hold single-season records with two teams. Howard also became one of six players to average a double-double in each of his first 13 seasons in the league.

On July 6, 2018, Howard was traded to the Brooklyn Nets in exchange for Timofey Mozgov, the draft rights to Hamidou Diallo, a 2021 second-round draft pick and cash considerations. He was waived by the Nets immediately upon being acquired.

=== Washington Wizards (2018–2019) ===
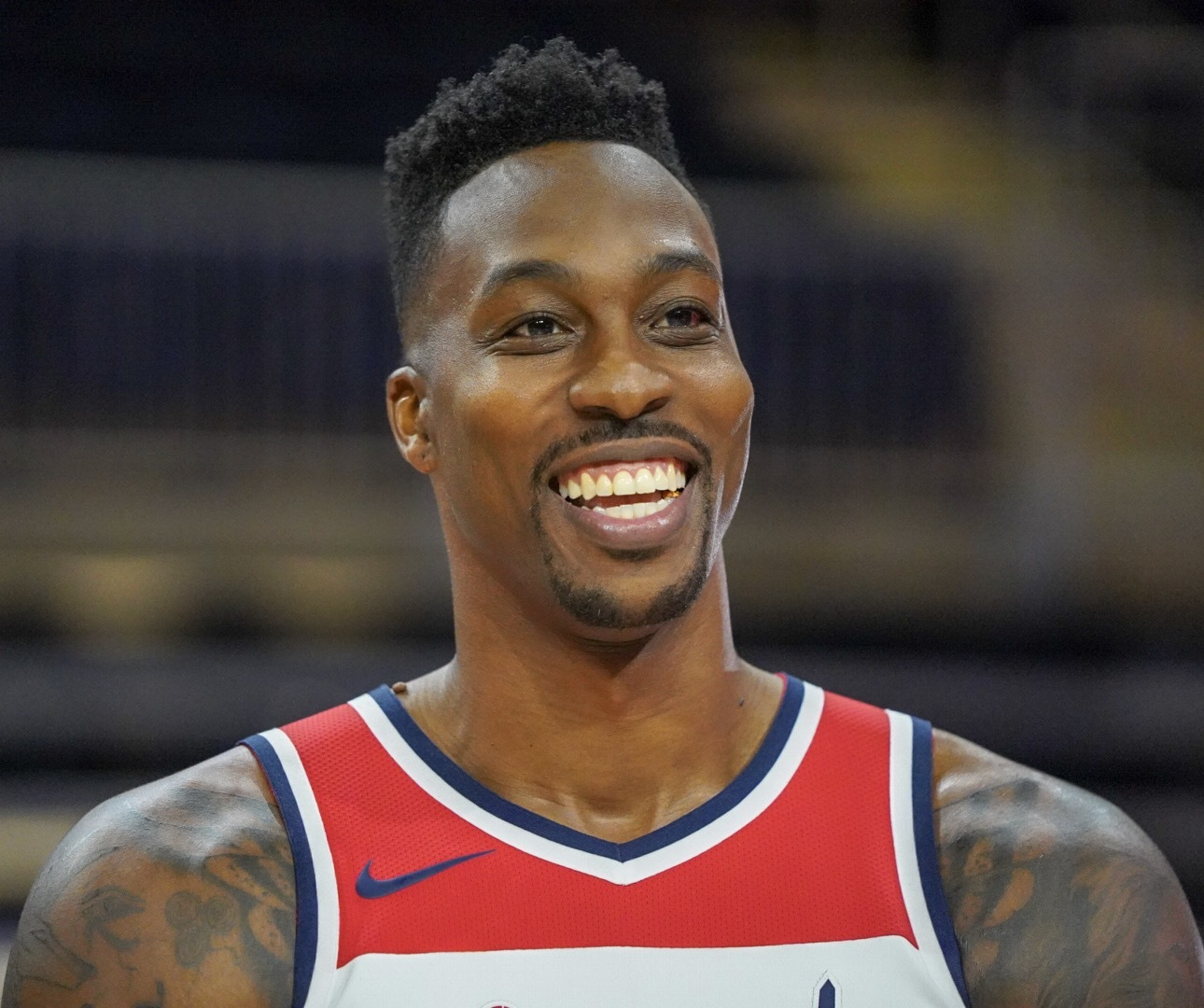
Howard with the Washington Wizards in 2018

On July 12, 2018, Howard signed with the Washington Wizards on a two-year, $10.9 million contract. He missed all of training camp, every exhibition game and the first seven regular-season games with a sore backside. He appeared in nine games in November before missing the rest of the season after undergoing spinal surgery to relieve pain in his glutes. In March 2019, it was revealed that Howard, in addition to his back injury, was also dealing with a hamstring issue. On April 18, 2019, Howard exercised his $5.6 million player option to play a second season with the Wizards.

On July 6, 2019, Howard was traded to the Memphis Grizzlies for forward C. J. Miles. On August 24, 2019, Howard was waived by the Grizzlies.

=== Second stint with the Lakers (2019–2020) ===
On August 26, 2019, Howard signed a $2.6 million veteran's minimum contract with the Los Angeles Lakers, reuniting him with his former team. He was replacing DeMarcus Cousins, a free agent signed earlier in the offseason who was lost for the year after suffering a knee injury. To assure the team that he would accept any role the team asked, Howard offered to sign a non-guaranteed contract, freeing the Lakers to cut him at any time.

During the season, the Lakers split time fairly evenly between him and starting center JaVale McGee. On January 13, 2020, Howard scored a season-high 21 points on a 9-of-11 shooting and got a season-high 15 rebounds. In Game 4 of the Western Conference finals against the Denver Nuggets, Lakers coach Frank Vogel started Howard to match up against the Nuggets' Nikola Jokić. Howard had 12 points and 11 rebounds in 23 minutes to help the Lakers win and take a 3–1 lead in the series. He had started twice during the regular season, but this was his first start by coach's decision when McGee was available. The Lakers advanced to the NBA Finals, winning the series 4–2 over the Miami Heat and giving Howard his first NBA championship.

=== Philadelphia 76ers (2020–2021) ===
On November 21, 2020, the Philadelphia 76ers signed Howard to a one-year deal worth $2,564,753. With the 76ers he averaged 7 points and 8.4 rebounds. Howard played 69 games with the Sixers with six starts in 17.3 minutes. He was suspended for one game after getting into a scuffle with Udonis Haslem where both were assessed technical fouls and Haslem was ejected. Howard was suspended because he incurred his 16th technical foul of the year. Despite winning the Atlantic division and the Eastern Conference regular season, in the Conference Semifinals against the Atlanta Hawks, the 76ers would lose in seven games which included a squandered 26-point lead in Game 5.

=== Third stint with the Lakers (2021–2022) ===
Howard signed a $2.6 million veteran's minimum contract with the Los Angeles Lakers on August 6, 2021. He averaged 6.2 points and 5.9 rebounds playing 60 games, starting 27 for the injury-ridden Anthony Davis. Despite one of the strongest rosters in the league, the Lakers, viewed by many as the premier championship contender, failed to make the playoffs, which was widely regarded by experts to be one of the greatest underachievements in NBA history.

=== Taoyuan Leopards (2022–2023) ===
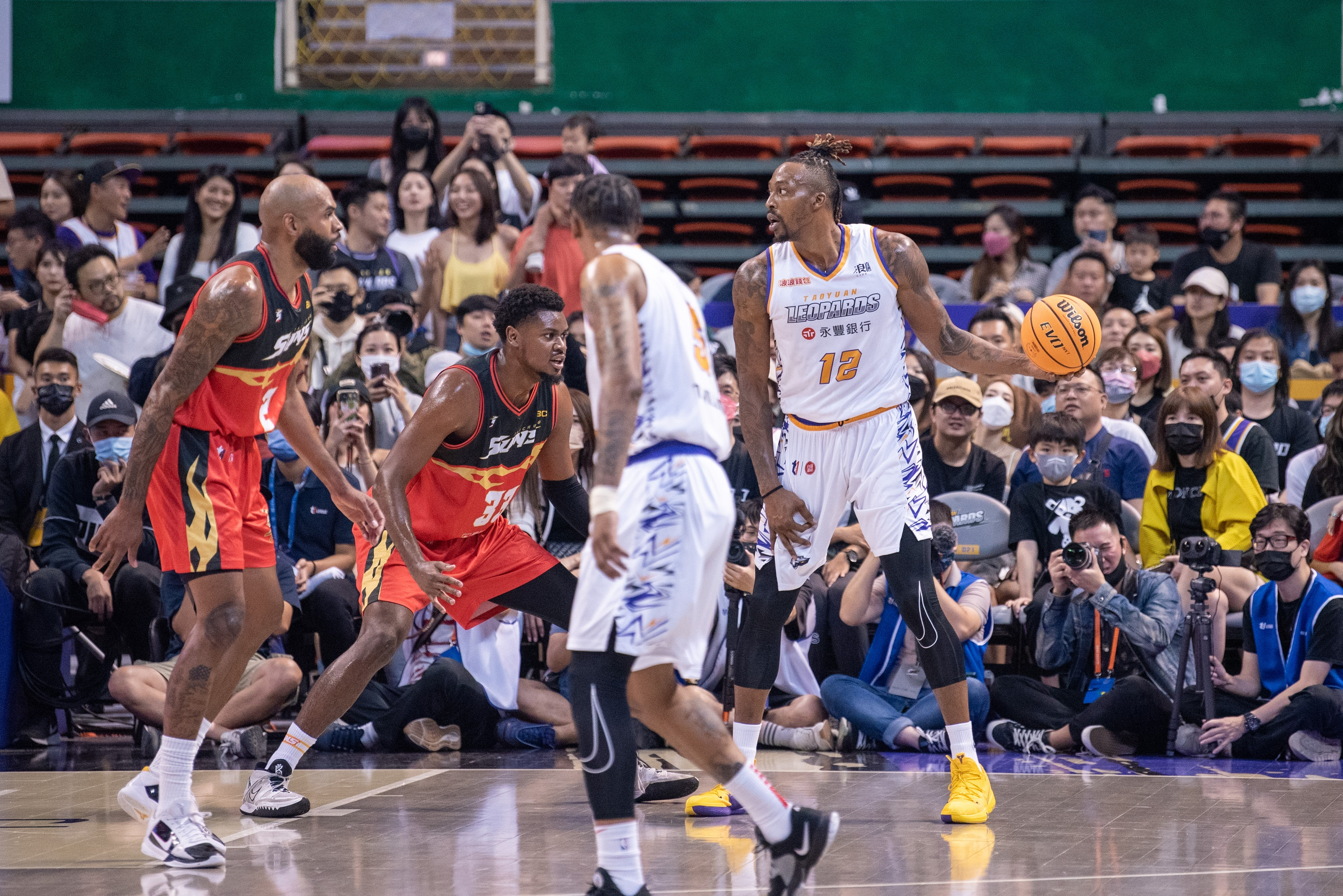
Howard with the Taoyuan Leopards in 2022

Unable to secure a roster spot in the NBA, Howard signed with the Taoyuan Leopards of the T1 League in Taiwan on November 7, 2022. While the league usually caps the salary of foreign players to US$200,000, it approved an exception for Howard, who would receive over $1 million. The league argued that Howard would raise the level of competition and boost the audience's interest. On November 19, Howard made his Leopards debut, putting up 38 points, 25 rebounds, 9 assists, and 4 blocks in a 120–115 win over New Taipei CTBC DEA. However, just one day later, after playing his first two games back-to-back and nearly averaging a triple-double, Howard was sidelined with a knee injury until mid-December. Howard attributed this to playing over 90 minutes within 26 hours, which he was no longer used to. His knee injury resurfaced after playing another string of back-to-back games from December 16 to 17, causing him to sit out another two weeks and it was decided that in the future, Howard would mostly be used in home games to not further aggravate the injury.

In February 2023, Howard was named an All-Star for the T1 League as well as the All-Star Game Most Famous Player, and was also selected to participate in the Three-Point Contest. He scored 37 points and was named All-Star game MVP. He was the league's rebounds leader for the 2022–23 season. On May 10, 2023, Howard was selected to the T1 League All-Defensive First Team in 2022–23 season. The next day, Howard was selected to the all-T1 League first team, and was awarded the Most Valuable Import of the T1 League for the 2022–23 season a day after that.

=== Later years (2023–2026) ===
After the end of the season, Howard reportedly had talks about joining the Australian National Basketball League and expressed openness to play in the Philippine Basketball Association, but joined neither. On March 1, 2024, Howard briefly signed with the Mets de Guaynabo of the Baloncesto Superior Nacional, but never played for them.

Howard briefly played on several exhibition teams. He joined Strong Group for the Dubai International Basketball Championship in January 2024, where he helped secure a silver medal finish and on May 30, 2024, he joined the Taiwan Mustangs of The Asian Tournament (TAT).

In 2025, Howard was chosen to be inducted into the Naismith Memorial Basketball Hall of Fame as an individual player and also as a member of the 2008 United States men's Olympic basketball team.

On March 12, 2026, Howard announced his first retirement from basketball.

On August 29, 2026, Howard joined the SG Apes of The League in Mongolia for one pre-season game.

On September 10, 2026 with the Black Fortress Tbilisi of the Georgian Superliga, where he played two season games one on October 10, 2026 an the second one on October 17, 2026 and had his second retirement afterwards.

== National team career ==
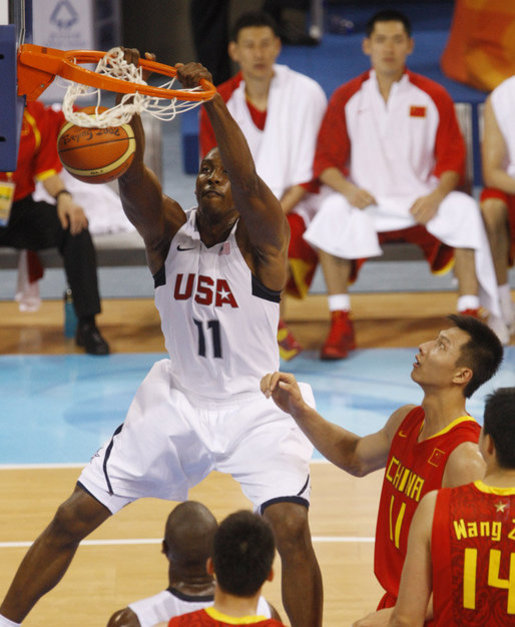
Howard at the 2008 Olympics

On March 5, 2006, Howard was named to the 2006–2008 USA Basketball Men's Senior National Team program. As the team's regular starting center, he helped lead the team to a 5–0 record during its pre-World Championship tour, and subsequently helped the team win the bronze medal at the 2006 FIBA World Championship. During the FIBA Americas Championship 2007, Howard was on the team which won its first nine games en route to qualifying for the finals and a spot for the 2008 Olympics. He started in eight of those nine games, averaging 8.9 ppg, 5.3 rpg and led the team in shooting .778 from the field. In the finals, he made all seven of his shots and scored 20 points as the USA defeated Argentina to win the gold medal.

On June 23, 2008, Howard was named as one of the 12 members of the US basketball team for the 2008 Olympic Games in Beijing. With Howard starting as center, Team USA won all of its games en route to the gold medal, restarting a streak of gold medals interrupted at the 2004 Olympics. Howard averaged 10.9 points and 5.8 rebounds per game in the tournament.

== Player profile ==
Standing 6 feet 10 inches (2.08 m) and weighing 265 pounds (120 kg), Howard played the center position. He led the NBA in rebounding from 2007 to 2010, and again from 2012 to 2013. Howard's rebounding was in part facilitated by his extraordinary athleticism; his running vertical leap was tested at 39.5 inches (100 cm) in 2011, rare for a player of his size. He demonstrated this skill in the 2007 Slam Dunk Contest, where he completed an alley oop dunk from teammate Jameer Nelson while slapping a sticker onto the backboard at 12 ft 6 in (3.81 m) high.

Howard's abilities and powerful physique drew attention from fellow NBA All-Stars. Tim Duncan remarked in 2007, "[Howard] is so developed... He has so much promise and I am glad that I will be out of the league when he is peaking." Kevin Garnett echoed those sentiments: "[Howard] is a freak of nature, man... I was nowhere near that physically talented. I wasn't that gifted, as far as body and physical presence." After a game in the 2009 NBA Playoffs, Philadelphia 76ers swingman Andre Iguodala stated, "It's like he can guard two guys at once. He can guard his guy and the guy coming off the pick-and-roll, which is almost impossible to do... If he gets any more athletic or jumps any higher, they're going to have to change the rules." In December 2007, ESPN writer David Thorpe declared Howard the most dominant center in the NBA. Early in his career, many sports pundits rated Howard one of the top young prospects in the NBA.

Howard had a reputation as a negative locker room presence. In a 2013 interview, he called his former Orlando Magic teammates a "team full of people no one wanted". In a 2013 article, "Is Dwight Howard the NBA's Worst Teammate?", Bleacher Report asserted that Howard had "extinguished all bridges with the franchise where he spent his first eight NBA seasons". Howard did not get along with Kobe Bryant when he first played for the Lakers and did not get along with James Harden when he played for the Rockets. During a 2015 game when he was a member of the Rockets, Howard was caught on video grabbing the genitals of teammate Isaiah Canaan. When he was traded from the Atlanta Hawks to the Charlotte Hornets, some of his Hawks teammates reportedly cheered. After Charlotte traded Howard to the Washington Wizards, commentator Brendan Haywood asserted that Howard was "hard to deal with, doesn't accept responsibility, cries a lot, has bad tendencies", and has "awful body language", and added that his teammates were "sick and tired of his act". In 2018, NBC News reported that "Howard’s time with the Magic, Lakers and Rockets devolved into interpersonal strife well before he left those teams". Also in 2018, The Ringer published a piece titled "Everybody (Still) Hates Dwight" in which it called Howard "almost certainly the least popular player in the NBA". When the Lakers signed Howard in 2019 to an unguaranteed contract, the team reportedly warned Howard that he would be dismissed immediately if they found that he engaged in inappropriate behavior.

== Awards and honors ==
NBA

- NBA champion: 2020
- 8× NBA All-Star: 2007–2014
- 8x All-NBA Team selections:
  - 5× First Team: 2008–2012
  - Second Team: 2014
  - 2× Third Team: 2007, 2013
- 3× NBA Defensive Player of the Year: 2009–2011
- 5x NBA All-Defensive Team selections:
  - 4× First Team: 2009–2012
  - Second Team: 2008
- NBA All-Rookie First Team: 2005
- NBA field goal percentage leader: 2010
- 5× NBA rebounding leader: 2008–2010, 2012, 2013
- 2× NBA blocks leader: 2009, 2010
- NBA Slam Dunk Contest champion: 2008

T1 League

- T1 League Most Valuable Import: 2023
- All-T1 League First Team: 2023
- T1 League All-Defensive First Team: 2023
- T1 League rebounding leader: 2023
- T1 League All-Star: 2023
- T1 League All-Star Game Most Famous Player: 2023
- T1 League All-Star Game MVP: 2023

High school

- National high school player of the year: 2004
- McDonald's All-American: 2004
- McDonald's All-American Game Co-MVP: 2004
- First-team Parade All-American: 2004
- Mr. Georgia Basketball: 2004

USA Basketball

- Olympic gold medalist: 2008
- FIBA World Championship bronze medalist: 2006
- FIBA Americas Championship gold medalist: 2007

== NBA career statistics ==
Legend
GP	Games played	GS	Games started	MPG	Minutes per game
FG%	Field goal percentage	3P%	3-point field goal percentage	FT%	Free throw percentage
RPG	Rebounds per game	APG	Assists per game	SPG	Steals per game
BPG	Blocks per game	PPG	Points per game	**Bold**	Career high
†	Won an NBA championship	*	Led the league

=== Regular season ===
Year	Team	GP	GS	MPG	FG%	3P%	FT%	RPG	APG	SPG	BPG	PPG
2004–05	Orlando	**82**	**82***	32.6	.520	.000	**.671**	10.0	.9	.9	1.7	12.0
2005–06	Orlando	**82***	81	36.8	.531	.000	.595	12.5	1.5	.8	1.4	15.8
2006–07	Orlando	**82***	**82***	36.9	.603	.500	.586	12.3	**1.9**	.9	1.9	17.6
2007–08	Orlando	**82***	**82***	37.7	.599	.000	.590	14.2*	1.3	.9	2.1	20.7
2008–09	Orlando	79	79	35.7	.572	.000	.594	13.8*	1.4	1.0	**2.9***	20.6
2009–10	Orlando	**82***	**82***	34.7	.612*	.000	.592	13.2*	1.8	.9	2.8*	18.3
2010–11	Orlando	78	78	37.5	.593	.000	.596	14.1	1.4	1.4	2.4	**22.9**
2011–12	Orlando	54	54	**38.3**	.573	.000	.491	**14.5***	**1.9**	**1.5**	2.1	20.6
2012–13	L.A. Lakers	76	76	35.8	.578	.167	.492	12.4*	1.4	1.1	2.4	17.1
2013–14	Houston	71	71	33.7	.591	.286	.547	12.2	1.8	.8	1.8	18.3
2014–15	Houston	41	41	29.8	.593	.500	.528	10.5	1.2	.7	1.3	15.8
2015–16	Houston	71	71	32.1	.620	.000	.489	11.8	1.4	1.0	1.6	13.7
2016–17	Atlanta	74	74	29.7	.633	.000	.533	12.7	1.4	.9	1.2	13.5
2017–18	Charlotte	81	81	30.4	.555	.143	.574	12.5	1.3	.6	1.6	16.6
2018–19	Washington	9	9	25.6	.623	—	.604	9.2	.4	.8	.4	12.8
2019–20†	L.A. Lakers	69	2	18.9	**.729**	**.600**	.514	7.3	.7	.4	1.1	7.5
2020–21	Philadelphia	69	6	17.3	.587	.250	.576	8.4	.9	.4	.9	7.0
2021–22	L.A. Lakers	60	27	16.2	.612	.533	.658	5.9	.6	.6	.6	6.2
Career		1,242	1,078	31.8	.587	.214	.567	11.8	1.3	.9	1.8	15.7
All-Star		8	6	23.3	.642	.154	.450	8.8	1.5	.6	1.1	12.1

=== Playoffs ===
Year	Team	GP	GS	MPG	FG%	3P%	FT%	RPG	APG	SPG	BPG	PPG
2007	Orlando	4	4	41.8	.548	—	.455	14.8	1.8	.5	1.0	15.3
2008	Orlando	10	10	42.1	.581	—	.542	**15.8**	.9	.8	3.4	18.9
2009	Orlando	**23**	**23**	39.3	.601	.000	.636	15.3	**1.9**	.9	2.6	20.3
2010	Orlando	14	14	35.5	.614	—	.519	11.1	1.4	.8	**3.5**	18.1
2011	Orlando	6	6	**43.0**	.630	.000	**.682**	15.5	0.5	.7	1.8	**27.0**
2013	L.A. Lakers	4	4	31.5	.619	—	.444	10.8	1.0	.5	2.0	17.0
2014	Houston	6	6	38.5	.547	—	.625	13.7	1.8	.7	2.8	26.0
2015	Houston	17	17	33.8	.577	—	.412	14.0	1.2	**1.4**	2.3	16.4
2016	Houston	5	5	36.0	.542	.000	.368	14.0	1.6	.8	1.4	13.2
2017	Atlanta	6	6	26.1	.500	—	.632	10.7	1.3	1.0	.8	8.0
2020†	L.A. Lakers	18	7	15.7	**.684**	**.500**	.556	4.6	.5	.4	.4	5.8
2021	Philadelphia	12	0	12.4	.533	.000	.600	6.3	.7	.2	.5	4.7
Career		125	102	31.6	.589	.143	.548	11.8	1.2	.8	2.0	15.3

== Other media ==
=== Documentaries ===
In 2014, Epix featured Howard as the focal point of a documentary about his life called In the Moment.

Howard appeared as a guest in the "Taipei" episode of Netflix docu-series Somebody Feed Phil, which aired in 2024. Dining with Philip Rosenthal, Howard discussed his charity work and the cultural shock he experienced upon moving to Taiwan. Simultaneously, he enjoyed Taiwanese and Hong Kong cuisine that he had never tried before, including foie gras and uni (sea urchin).

=== Political and social commentary ===
In August 2024, Howard revealed that he has never voted in a US election. Howard stated that he wanted to focus on his family first over focusing on politics.

In January 2025, Howard stated that ten minutes after he tweeted "Free Palestine" during the 2014 Gaza war, he was told by NBA commissioner Adam Silver to immediately remove the tweet and apologize. The next day, the NBA league office described Howard’s claim as categorically false and said that Silver did not contact Howard regarding the post.

In December 2025, Howard tweeted that all American citizens should be required to complete one year of military service.

=== Other media ===
Howard appeared as a special guest on an episode of the ABC series Extreme Makeover: Home Edition that aired April 2, 2006, in which Ty Pennington and his team built a new home and ministry offices for Sadie Holmes, who operates a social services ministry in the Orlando area.

Howard competed in season 6 of The Masked Singer as "Octopus". He was the first one to be eliminated during the two-night premiere alongside Vivica A. Fox as "Mother Nature" and Toni Braxton as "Pufferfish".

Starting with 2004's ESPN NBA 2K5, Howard appeared in every entry of the NBA 2K series of basketball simulation video games up until 2021's NBA 2K22, totaling 18 entries and covering his entire NBA career. Similarly, he appeared in every NBA Live entry from 2004's NBA Live 2005 onwards until the series was canceled in 2018 following NBA Live 19, totaling 11 games. Additionally, he was the cover athlete of NBA Live 10. Furthermore, he appeared in multiple spin-off titles for both series, such as NBA Street V3, NBA Street Homecourt, NBA Jam, NBA Elite 11, NBA Playgrounds, and NBA 2K Playgrounds 2.

In 2011, he played himself on an episode of The Suite Life on Deck alongside fellow NBA players Deron Williams and Kevin Love.

In 2023, he finished third on Special Forces: World's Toughest Test.

On September 4, 2024, Howard competed on the thirty-third season of Dancing with the Stars. Paired with Daniella Karagach, they were eliminated on November 12.

In September 2025, he participated in the first American season of the British reality TV series, Inside.

== Philanthropy ==
Before he was drafted in 2004, Howard said that he wanted to use his NBA career and Christian faith to "raise the name of God within the league and throughout the world". He has stated he believes in reaching out to his community and fans and thus contributes substantially in the field of philanthropy. Together with his parents, Howard established the Dwight D. Howard Foundation Inc. in 2004. In November 2009, the center was named one of the 10 finalists for the Jefferson Awards for Public Service, which awards athletes for their charitable work.

In 2022, on his 37th birthday, Howard raised over NT$3 million (US$97,969) with a charitable auction. Items sold included collectible jerseys and pairs of shoes worn by Howard. The two charities were CountryEDU Charity Foundation and the Good Shepherd Social Welfare foundation. He also "visited three schools on Wednesday and Thursday to interact and play basketball with the students, inspiring them to pursue their passion".

== Legal issues ==
=== Defamation judgment against Royce Reed ===
In 2010, Howard won a defamation judgment against Royce Reed, the mother of his oldest child Braylon. A Florida judge ruled that she violated a court order prohibiting her from mentioning Howard in the media. He had initially sought about half a billion dollars in damages, claiming that she had disparaged him through Twitter and her appearances on the reality television show Basketball Wives, as the couple's paternity agreement stipulated a $500 fine for each time she mentioned him in public.

=== Corporal punishment claim ===
In October 2014, police in Cobb County, Georgia, investigated claims by Reed that Howard abused their son. Howard had admitted to hitting Braylon with a belt; he had been disciplined in the same manner while growing up, and he stated that he did not realize it was wrong to do so. Howard was not charged in connection with the allegations. Howard was also involved in a civil case with Reed over custody of their son.

=== Assault and battery allegation ===
In July 2023, a man sued Howard for assault, battery, intentional infliction of emotional distress, and false imprisonment. The lawsuit stemmed from an encounter with the man at Howard's Georgia residence in July 2021. The plaintiff alleged that Howard coerced him into a threesome with another man and forced himself sexually on the plaintiff. Howard denied the allegations and asked that the lawsuit be dismissed, stating that the two had engaged in "consensual sexual activity" and that the "case had been made public for profit". The lawsuit was dismissed with prejudice in August 2024.

== Personal life ==
Howard has five children: three sons (Braylon, Dwight, David) and two daughters (Layla, Jayde). They each have a different mother. Melissa Rios, the mother of his son David, died on March 27, 2020, following an epileptic seizure. He has been involved in several public and legal issues with Royce Reed, the mother of his oldest son Braylon.

Howard keeps approximately 20 snakes as pets and has appeared twice on Animal Planet's reality TV series Tanked. He owns a farm "in north Georgia where he relaxes [with] cows, hogs, turkeys and deer," and also grows vegetables on his estate in Suwanee, Georgia.

Howard dated WNBA basketball player Te'a Cooper, and the pair became engaged in 2019. However, in 2021, Howard and Cooper parted ways.

In 2024, Howard announced his engagement to rapper and reality TV personality Amy Luciani. The couple married in a private ceremony in January 2025. In July 2025, Luciani filed for divorce, citing that the marriage was "irretrievably broken".

Despite persistent rumors regarding his sexuality and a 2023 lawsuit in which he admitted to having sex with a man, Howard has repeatedly denied that he is gay or bisexual.

== See also ==
- List of NBA franchise career scoring leaders
- List of NBA career rebounding leaders
- List of NBA career blocks leaders
- List of NBA career turnovers leaders
- List of NBA career personal fouls leaders
- List of NBA career field goal percentage leaders
- List of NBA career free throw scoring leaders
- List of NBA career games played leaders
- List of NBA career playoff rebounding leaders
- List of NBA career playoff blocks leaders
- List of NBA annual rebounding leaders
- List of NBA annual blocks leaders
- List of NBA single-season rebounding leaders
- List of NBA single-game blocks leaders
- List of NBA single-game rebounding leaders
