= Tang Xing =

Chinese CTO

Tang Xing (simplified Chinese: 汤兴; traditional Chinese: 湯興; pinyin: Tāng Xīng) is iQIYI's CTO since March 2012. His responsibilities include developing and managing the company's technology-based products and services. Previously, he served as the Technology Director for Google's Research and Development Center in Shanghai, where he was responsible for Google's video search business and the YouTube video search service.

Dr. Tang has worked across numerous platforms including the Internet, mobile phone, and television. He holds a doctorate in mathematics from the University of Science and Technology of China (USTC).
