= Timothy Tuttle =

Serial entrepreneur and CEO

Timothy Tuttle is a serial entrepreneur and CEO of MindMeld, a San Francisco company with a platform for building intelligent voice interfaces.

== Biography ==
Timothy Tuttle studied at the Artificial Intelligence Lab and the Lab for Computer Science at MIT, where he received his BS, MS, and PhD. He also served as a member of the research staff at MIT and Bell Laboratories.

In 2000, Tuttle left research to co-found Bang Networks, builder of the Internet's first large-scale content distribution network for real-time data, where he served as CTO. In 2004, Tuttle co-founded Truveo, his second company, a video search engine that was acquired by AOL in 2006. Following the acquisition, Tuttle served as Senior Vice President at AOL. In 2011, Tuttle began work on his third company MindMeld.

Tuttle is a recipient of the Harvard Business School Dubilier Prize for Entrepreneurship and was selected as one of the 100 Top Young Innovators by MIT Technology Review Magazine.
