= Michael J. Kelly =

American entrepreneur and media executive

- Born: 1957 (age 68–69); Chicago, Illinois, United States
- Education: University of Wisconsin; University of Illinois
- Occupation: Media executive
- Years active: 1980–present
- Known for: Entertainment Weekly (1996-2000); Founder & CEO, American Town Network (2000-02); President, AOL Media Networks (2004-07); President & CEO, The Weather Channel Co (2009-12) l
- Spouse: Martha Hall Kelly

Michael J. "Mike" Kelly (born 1957) is an American entrepreneur and media executive. He is the co-founder and CEO of KNV, a digital media investment and advisory firm. Prior to that, he was the president and CEO of The Weather Channel Companies, president of AOL Media Networks, and also held various executive positions at Time Warner and AOL.

Kelly is not to be confused with J. Michael Kelly, who was CFO of AOL when it was a standalone company, then CFO of AOL Time Warner after the merger, COO of the AOL division within AOL Time Warner (since renamed Time Warner), and then CEO of AOL International.

== Early life and education ==
Kelly was born and raised in Chicago, Illinois. His father, also named Michael J. Kelly, was a longtime advertising executive in Chicago and New York, and his great uncle was Edward Joseph Kelly, the mayor of Chicago from 1933 to 1947.

Kelly attended the University of Wisconsin–Madison and later graduated from the University of Illinois at Urbana–Champaign with a Bachelor of Arts in political science.

== Career ==
=== Time Inc. and American Town Network (1980-2002) ===
After beginning his career at the Chicago Tribune in 1980, Kelly moved to Time Inc. in 1983, where he remained until 2000. While there, he managed the Southeast and New York sales offices for Fortune magazine, before joining the launch team of Entertainment Weekly in 1989. He w as the magazine's publisher from 1996 until 2000, and was twice named Publisher of the Year.

In 2000, Kelly founded American Town Network, and was CEO of the locally focused, community-based digital platform until 2002. By 2009, American Town Network had become the largest "hyper-local" platform in the US.

=== Time Warner and AOL (2002-07) ===
In 2002, two years after AOL and Time Warner merged, Kelly was named president of global marketing for Time Warner. He became the founding president of AOL Media Networks in 2004, responsible for AOL's marketing and advertising. While at AOL, Kelly oversaw the company's Web advertising buying spree, including its June 2004 purchase of Advertising.com for $435 million. He also oversaw AOL's partnership with Google, and the company's acquisition of mobile ad firm Third Screen Media. While he was at AOL, advertising and commerce revenue more than tripled, to over $2.2 billion. He left AOL in 2007.

=== The Weather Channel (2009-12) ===
On July 20, 2009, shortly after The Weather Channel was sold by Landmark Communications to NBC Universal and private equity firms Bain Capital and Blackstone Group for $3.5 billion, Kelly was named president and CEO of The Weather Channel Companies (TWCC). He was responsible for the strategic direction and operations of The Weather Channel, The Weather Channel Interactive, weather.com and The Weather Channel Mobile, Weather Services International and Enterprise Electronics Corporation.

Under Kelly, TWCC saw huge growth in its digital media business, specifically involving its mobile apps and data. This growth would lead to IBM's 2015 purchase of The Weather Company's digital division for an undisclosed sum. Kelly also oversaw the addition of taped reality shows and documentaries, which were not always directly connected to weather. This change improved the channel's ratings, but was said to alienate some fans who preferred strictly weather-related programming.

Kelly left TWCC in 2012, becoming a special advisor to TWCC and Bain Capital.

=== Other work ===
Since 2004, Kelly has been a board member of The Kelly Gang, a media-centric group of executives who have raised money for philanthropic purposes through annual St. Patrick's Day celebrations.

From 2007 to 2009, he was an advisor to media-focused private equity fund Veronis Suhler Stevenson. He was on the board of numerous digital media companies, including Eyeblaster, VisibleWorld, ContextWeb and American Town Network. He is on the board of directors of the American Advertising Federation, where he twice chaired the Advertising Hall of Fame, and was on the Ad Council. Since 2011, he has sat on the board of councilors at the Carter Center in Atlanta.

In 2012, Kelly was named chairman of cloud-based media planning software company ColSpace, becoming lead investor in 2014. On May 19, 2016, Colspace was acquired by Mediaocean (owned by Vista Equity Partners). Also in 2012, Kelly joined London-based media advertising company Unruly Media as non-executive lead director, later being named chairman. On September 16, 2015, it was announced that Unruly would be purchased by News Corp for $176 million.

== Personal life ==
Kelly's wife, Martha Hall Kelly, is a writer whose debut novel, Lilac Girls, was published by Ballantine Books in 2016.
