= NBA Street Showdown =

2005 video game

- North American cover art featuring LeBron James
- Developer: Team Fusion
- Publisher: EA Sports BIG
- Director: Jez Sherlock
- Producer: Joel Manners
- Designer: Kevin Chorney
- Programmer: Craig Hall
- Artist: Todd Pollich
- Series: NBA Street
- Platform: PlayStation Portable
- Release: NA: April 25, 2005; EU: September 1, 2005
- Genre: Sports game
- Modes: Single-player, Multiplayer

NBA Street Showdown is a basketball video game developed by Canadian studio Team Fusion and published by Electronic Arts under the EA Sports BIG label. It is the fourth installment in the NBA Street series, and a handheld port of NBA Street V3. The game was released in 2005 for the PlayStation Portable.

LeBron James is featured on the cover, attempting a slam dunk.

== Gameplay ==
NBA Street Showdown incorporates gameplay elements from NBA Street Vol. 2, with the presentation of NBA Street V3. The game primarily features the minigames Shot Blocker and Arcade Shootout, as well as quick game modes. Players can play head-to-head in all of these through ad hoc mode. King of the Courts is a game mode where you can unlock different courts as a reward for defeating neighborhood street teams. Challenges include playing a team in Shot Blocker or in a game without trick points. Players can play current NBA teams and older teams made up of legendary players.

== Reception ==
Reception

Aggregate score
Aggregator	Score
Metacritic	75/100

Review scores
Publication	Score
1Up.com	B
Electronic Gaming Monthly	6.67/10
Famitsu	30/40
Game Informer	7/10
GameSpot	7.7/10
GameSpy	3.5/5
GameZone	8/10
IGN	8/10
Official U.S. PlayStation Magazine	3/5
X-Play	2/5

The game received "generally favorable reviews" according to the review aggregation website Metacritic. In Japan, where the game was ported for release on September 29, 2005, Famitsu gave it a score of two sevens and two eights for a total of 30 out of 40.
