= CastTV =

Internet video search and aggregation company

- Company type: Private
- Website type: Video search engine
- Founded: 2006
- Headquarters: San Francisco, CA, US
- Founders: Edwin Ong & Alex Vikati
- Website: www.casttv.com
- Current status: Acquired

CastTV was a former Internet video search and aggregation company based in San Francisco, California. After the company was acquired by the Tribune Company in 2010, its popular consumer website was closed down and the core technology was used to build various enterprise data products, including Online Video Data, which powers the universal video search for Google, Roku, TiVo, and other online video providers.

CastTV was founded in 2006 by Edwin Ong and Alex Vikati. Services included a video search engine and the licensing of video search technology to media companies.

CastTV's search index incorporated both popular and longtail content, including TV shows, movies, celebrity, news, sports and viral videos. The company filtered out expired videos, duplicate videos, and video spam.

== History ==
- Early 2006: CastTV is founded by husband and wife entrepreneurs, Edwin Ong and Alex Vikati.
- December 2006: CastTV secures its first customer: Gemstar - TV Guide.
- April 2007: CastTV raises a $3.1M Series A from Draper Fisher Jurvetson and additional funding from investors including Ron Conway and Marc Andreessen. Advisors include Rajeev Motwani and Timothy Chou.
- 2008: CastTV launched consumer beta.
- December 2010: Acquired by Tribune Company.
- 2011: Tribune launched Online Video Data product powered by CastTV technology.
