= Alex St. John =

American engineer

Alex St. John, along with Craig Eisler and Eric Engstrom, created the original Microsoft DirectX technology platform. Alex became the Microsoft Windows Game technology evangelist for DirectX through his early work at Microsoft (1992-1997) to advance Windows as a dominant graphics and media platform. The early DirectX team worked closely with Id Software to port Doom to Windows 95 which became the very first DirectX game ever published. DirectX became the media foundation for Windows itself and later the DirectXBox. As a Microsoft evangelist, St. John became known for his outrageous and often controversial marketing stunts to attract game developers to the new DirectX platform.

Formerly the founder and chairman of WildTangent software, an online video game developer and publisher, Alex was appointed in December, 2009 as the President and CTO of Hi5, a social networking site with an emphasis on online gaming. St. John later Co-founded Nyriad LLC an exascale storage technology company based in New Zealand. Alex is also a frequent contributor to Computer Power User magazine and Maximum PC magazine.

He described himself on Usenet as "[Microsoft's] dually [sic] appointed DirectRepresentative for this technology." He is one of the main subjects of the book Renegades of the Empire and is mentioned in Masters of Doom and Opening The Xbox.

Alex St. John is also the CEO of PlayCast Inc., a service where people can allow their PCs to host cloud gaming instances while idle.
