= Eric Engstrom =

American software engineer (1965–2020)

- Born: January 25, 1965; Oroville, Washington
- Died: December 1, 2020 (aged 55); Seattle, Washington
- Known for: DirectX

Eric Engstrom (January 25, 1965 – December 1, 2020) was an American software engineer. While working at Microsoft, Engstrom alongside Alex St. John and Craig Eisler was responsible for the development of DirectX, an application programming interface for Microsoft Windows that paved the way for Windows to be a viable gaming platform as well as leading into the development of the Xbox line of video game consoles.

== Early life ==
Engstrom was born in 1965 in Oroville, Washington. He attended but did not complete a degree at Washington State University. While working a number of odd jobs after leaving college, he taught himself computer programming.

== Career ==
Engstrom had joined Microsoft on a suggestion from a friend, starting in a consulting position for customer support. After the contract term had ended, he was given offers for a permanent job at both Microsoft and at Data I/O, opting to take the latter due to its larger salary despite the Microsoft offer having included stock options. A few years later, he quit Data I/O and returned to Microsoft by 1991 as a technical evangelist. In late 1994, he was brought in by Alex St. John along with Craig Eisler to figure out a solution to developing video game programming interfaces for Windows 95, as St. John had found developers were wary of moving from MS-DOS to the new environment. While Eisler focused on programming the new interface, Engstrom and St. John worked to evangelize this effort outside of Microsoft, as they had not received much internal support for the effort; Microsoft's management had deemed the likelihood of Windows 95 to be a viable gaming platform to be low. The three revealed the new interface around April 1995 and soon named it DirectX, in part because it directly accessed the computer hardware and bypassed some of the Windows 95's APIs. DirectX was added to Windows 95 by September 1995, and became a critical factor in helping to bring more games to Windows. Later, the capabilities of DirectX led Microsoft to also develop the Xbox video game console hardware. Engstrom's, St. John's, and Eisler's effort to build DirectX against the resistance they faced within Microsoft led them to be called the "Beastie Boys", and the subject of the book Renegades of the Empire by Michael Drummond.

Engstrom left Microsoft after establishing the basis of DirectX and founded Wildseed around 2000; Wildseed was an early mobile phone technology company and was subsequently acquired by America On-line in 2005; within AOL, the Wildseed acquisition reunited Engstrom and Eisler. Engstorm had also co-founded Catalytic, a software firm based in Kirkland, Washington but using a staff of programmers from India housed on a campus named New Oroville near Hyderabad. While they had planned a 500-acre campus in India, the Great Recession forced them to scale back plans to only a 50-acre facility there, and by 2010, the company had been wound down.

He returned to work at Microsoft in 2008 working in the areas of Windows Mobile and user-targeted advertising for Microsoft's online services. After leaving Microsoft again in 2014, he spent his time as a chief technology officer and adviser for a number of startups.

== Personal life and death ==
Engstrom met his wife Cindy during his Wildseed endeavour, and married her on February 2, 2005. They had four children. Engstrom suffered an accident in the lab when a monitor fell on his foot. He took too much Tylenol which caused liver toxicity, and died on December 1, 2020.
