= NBA Street (series) =

- Genres: Sports (basketball)
- Developer: Electronic Arts
- Publisher: EA Sports
- First release: NBA Street; June 19, 2001
- Latest release: NBA Street Homecourt; February 20, 2007

NBA Street is a series of arcade-style basketball video games produced by EA Sports BIG. It combines the talent and big names of the NBA with the attitude and atmosphere of streetball. Since the original game's debut in 2001, incarnations of the series have been released for the PlayStation 2, GameCube, Xbox, Xbox 360, and PlayStation 3. The game includes power-ups, as well as special trick moves and animations. One can choose to play half court or full court, with the number of players depending on which is selected.

Currently, there have been seven games published in the series:

- NBA Street – the first in the series.
- NBA Street Vol. 2 – the sequel to NBA Street
- NBA Street V3 – the third installment in the series.
- NBA Street Showdown – the PSP port of NBA Street V3.
- NBA Street Homecourt – the fourth installment in the series for Xbox 360 and PS3.
- NBA Street Online – 2008 South Korean online game.
- NBA Street Online 2 – 2009 South Korean online game.
- NBA The Run – the fifth installment in the series for PC, PlayStation 5 and Xbox Series X and Series S. (This game is unassociated with the NBA street series.)

== See also ==
- FIFA Street
- NFL Street
