= Adtech =

Digital marketing company

Adtech AG
- Company type: Subsidiary
- Founded: 1998
- Headquarters: Frankfurt, Hesse, Germany
- Owner: Verizon Communications
- Parent: AOL (2007–present)

Adtech AG is a German–American digital marketing company that retails products to manage, serve and evaluate online advertising campaigns (including display, video and mobile formats). The company was founded in 1998 in Frankfurt, Germany, and was acquired by web portal AOL on May 15, 2007. The company was merged into the Oath Inc. brand, as a subsidiary of Verizon Communications.

== History ==
Adtech was founded in 1998 in Frankfurt, Germany, by Michael Stusch and Michael Schultheiß. In 2000, the American Internet holding company CMGI acquired a controlling interest (80%) in Adtech. During the same year, Adtech became a private limited company.

Based on AdForce Inc.’s technology, Adtech opened its first data center in Frankfurt (Germany) in 1998. By 2001, Adtech had delivered its ten billionth banner ad. In 2002 Adtech supplied its 100,000th advertising campaign and delivered more than 100 million banners every day. In 2004, the AdForce technology was replaced by Adtech's own ad serving technology. Shortly after, the second ad serving data center was launched in Frankfurt.

On May 16, 2007, AOL announced its acquisition of Adtech AG. Adtech was acquired to provide AOL with an ad serving platform enabling website publishers to manage, traffic and report on their online advertising campaigns. After operating as an independent and wholly owned subsidiary of AOL's Advertising.com division, as the ad-serving platform for AOL Advertising (previously Platform-A), the company as of November 2018 is part of Oath Inc., owned by Verizon Communications.

== Products ==
Adtech provides an integrated ad serving platform. This product allows publishers, advertisers, agencies and ad networks the ability to manage their display, video and mobile digital advertising campaigns.

Adtech's ad server responds to banner requests, prompted by user's browsers, through XML and delivers it to the specified end system — the only provision being the terminals must be online.

The open design of the Adtech Adservers allows for the implementation of external technologies. In targeting, Adtech collaborates with vendors such as Nugg and Wunderloop.

=== Integrated ad management ===
In the fall of 2007, Adtech presented an integrated suite of display, video and mobile ad serving technologies for digital publishers at ad:tech London and ad:tech New York.

In collaboration with technology partners Lightningcast and Third Screen Media, Adtech merged the new video and mobile applications directly into the existing user interface and reporting system.

According to Adtech, digital advertisements can be distributed to mobile devices of any type, including mobile and smart phones. Their customers are also able to apply selective targeting options to address advertiser needs.

== Research ==
Since 2004, Adtech interprets the banner requests to their ad servers for periodical Web analyses in Europe. Adtech surveys document different aspects of Internet usage, ranging from browser trends to click-through rates. They also serve as a reference in professional articles about trends in the digital marketing industry.
