= Wildseed =

American mobile software company

- Type: Subsidiary of AOL
- Founded: United States
- Headquarters: United States
- Number of employees: 34 (2005)

Wildseed is a mobile software company based in the United States. It was founded in June 2000 in Kirkland, Washington, by ex-Microsoft executive Eric Engstrom. AOL acquired Wildseed on August 7, 2005.
