= NBA Street V3 =

2005 video game

- European PS2 cover art with Baron Davis
- Developer: EA Canada
- Publisher: EA Sports BIG
- Producer: Shyang Kong
- Designer: Daniel Erickson
- Artist: Kirk Gibbons
- Composer: Tim McKenzie
- Series: NBA Street
- Platforms: GameCube, PlayStation 2, Xbox
- Release: NA: February 8, 2005; EU: February 18, 2005; JP: May 26, 2005 (GC); JP: August 4, 2005 (PS2)
- Genre: Sports
- Modes: Single-player, multiplayer

NBA Street V3 is a 2005 basketball video game developed by EA Canada and published by Electronic Arts under the EA Sports BIG label for the GameCube, PlayStation 2, and Xbox. It is the third installment in the NBA Street series. The game was later ported to the PlayStation Portable under the title NBA Street Showdown. Baron Davis of the New Orleans Pelicans is featured on the cover.

The game features all 30 NBA teams along with five players from each team, as well as numerous NBA legends, such as Larry Bird and Magic Johnson. The GameCube version is notable for including cameos from the Mario series under a collaboration with Nintendo.

It was followed by NBA Street Homecourt.

== Gameplay ==
NBA Street V3 focuses on the streetball variation of basketball, with a more arcade-like style of gameplay compared to the simulation style of EA Sports' NBA Live series. Games have three players on each team with no out of bounds, fouls, or game clock; they include a shot clock, however. Games are usually played until a team scores 21 points, though a team must win by at least two points; the game continues past 21 points otherwise. Each short range shot is worth one point, while a shot from long range (beyond the usual three-point line) is worth two. They can also be played with NBA scoring rules, however, where a short range shot is worth two points and a long range shot is worth three. In exhibition games, the player may use a custom rule set that allows for the game to be played with either scoring rules and up to any number of points, with 50 being the limit.

In NBA Street V3, Gamebreakers return to their original format from NBA Street, becoming once again unpocketable. This time, while in the air just before landing a dunk, the person controlling the Gamebreaker can do tricks with the right analog stick or pass the ball to teammates. Depending on how well these tricks are executed, and how long the ball is passed (each player may only have the ball once during a Gamebreaker), a dunk could be worth two to four points, and the opposing player's score would be subtracted by one, causing a three-to-five point swing. In an NBA game, the score changes become three to five points for the offense and a loss of two for the defense, amounting to a five-to-seven point swing. The risks added by this mechanic are the possibility of overdoing the tricks and therefore missing the basket, or (due to the variance in offensive points) allowing an opponent to take advantage of a poor or failed Gamebreaker to entirely reverse the momentum of the game. The same controls for the Gamebreaker apply in the new Dunk Contest feature. The "trick stick" is also used on the ground for specific tricks, while the trick button now performs a random trick.

12 courts based on real-life locations are featured in the game; The Cage, Gun Hill, Dyckman, and Rucker Park in New York City, Garland Park (known as "The Hawk" in-game) in Pittsburgh, Pennsylvania, The Dome in Baltimore, Maryland, Tandy Recreation Center in St. Louis, Missouri, Foss Park in Chicago, Illinois, MacGregor Park in Houston, Texas, Venice Beach in Los Angeles, California, Mosswood Park in Oakland, California, and Brighton Beach in Brighton, England, the only European court in the game. Players can also create their own courts, which can be used as their home court in the Street Challenge mode. After selecting which city the court is in, players can edit all aspects of the court, including its surface, backboard, backdrop, and wall murals. The player can buy more items for their court as they progress through the game and earn Street Points. Aside from customization of National Basketball Association players, it includes detailed character creators. Along with SSX On Tour, the GameCube version contains three characters as playable characters: Mario, Luigi, and Princess Peach. This was part of a deal Nintendo had with EA Sports to have Nintendo's intellectual properties appear in EA franchises.

== Development ==
NBA Street V3 was developed by EA Canada, and was released under the EA Sports BIG franchise. Its developing team largely consisted of the same people who developed SSX 3 and NBA Street Vol. 2. The game was first unveiled in July 2004 and was intended to be, according to the game's executive producer William Mozell, "[a] celebration of the culture and inventive style of street basketball".

== Reception ==
Reception

Aggregate scores
Aggregator	Score		
Aggregator	GameCube	PS2	Xbox
GameRankings	87.76%	88.18%	87.77%
Metacritic	88/100	89/100	89/100

Review scores
Publication	Score		
Publication	GameCube	PS2	Xbox
Electronic Gaming Monthly	8.83/10	8.83/10	8.83/10
Game Informer	9/10	9/10	9/10
GamePro	N/A	4/5	4/5
GameRevolution	B+	A−	A−
GameSpot	9.1/10	9.1/10	9.1/10
GameSpy	4.5/5	5/5	5/5
GameZone	9.2/10	9.1/10	9.5/10
IGN	9.4/10	9.4/10	9.4/10
Nintendo Power	3.9/5	N/A	N/A
Official U.S. PlayStation Magazine	N/A	4.5/5	N/A
Official Xbox Magazine (US)	N/A	N/A	9.1/10
Detroit Free Press	N/A	4/4	N/A
USA Today	3.5/4	3.5/4	3.5/4

Awards
Publication	Award
IGN	Editors' Choice Award
GameSpot	Editor's Choice Award

The game was met with very positive reception upon release. GameRankings and Metacritic gave it a score of 88% and 89 out of 100 for the PlayStation 2 and Xbox versions, and 88% and 88 out of 100 for the GameCube version.

Detroit Free Press gave the PS2 version all four stars and called it "deceptively deep, graphically sharp and a beauty to behold in the hands of two skilled players." USA Today gave the game three-and-a-half stars out of four, saying, "Style, style and more style sums up the presentation of EA's hallmark street franchise. The courts look authentic and D.J. Bobbito Garcia returns with more colorful play-by-play. The music is mostly classic hip-hop and rap artists like House of Pain and the Beastie Boys that fit nicely within the action." The Sydney Morning Herald gave it four stars out of five, saying, "The game has never looked better with easily recognisable pro players and vividly detailed courts. But where this latest installment excels is in enhanced options and customisation for serious fans, while still offering pick-up-and-play access for those after a quick sporting fix."
