= NBA Street Vol. 2 =

2003 video game

- Cover art with Michael Jordan, Julius Erving, and Bonafide
- Developers: NuFX; EA Canada
- Publisher: EA Sports BIG
- Producer: Wil Mozell
- Designer: Daniel Erickson
- Artist: Kirk Gibbons
- Composer: Jeff Mair
- Series: NBA Street
- Platforms: PlayStation 2, GameCube, Xbox
- Release: NA: April 29, 2003; JP: May 1, 2003 (PS2); EU: May 2, 2003
- Genre: Sports
- Modes: Single-player, multiplayer

NBA Street Vol. 2 is a basketball video game developed by NuFX and EA Canada and published by Electronic Arts under the EA Sports BIG label. It is the sequel to NBA Street and the second installment in the NBA Street series. NBA Street Vol. 2 was released on April 29, 2003, for the PlayStation 2, GameCube, and Xbox. Only the PlayStation 2 version was released in Japan; the GameCube version was planned for release in that region, but was cancelled. It was followed by NBA Street V3.

== Gameplay ==
Like the previous game, NBA Street Vol. 2 consists of 3-on-3 street basketball. There are 29 fully playable NBA teams from the 2002–03 NBA season in all modes once unlocked. The game also features four different modes to choose from including a Pick Up Game, NBA Challenge, Be a Legend, and Street School. The game also features several new trick moves and dunks, as well as introducing a level two "gamebreaker". Players will also earn reward points after every game that they win, which can be used to purchase many rewards such as players, jerseys, and courts. If players win a certain number of games, some rewards will be automatically unlocked.

In addition to "street legends", players can also unlock "NBA legends", including Larry Bird, Julius Erving, and others.

The game, at the time of release, was the only available game on the market in which three incarnations of Michael Jordan are playable: the 1985 Chicago Bulls Jordan, the 1996 Chicago Bulls Jordan, and the Washington Wizards Jordan. It is possible to play as a team made up of the three different Jordans.

The game also features an in-game soundtrack with tracks from artists including Nate Dogg featuring Eve, Pete Rock & CL Smooth, Erick Sermon featuring Redman, Benzino, MC Lyte, Black Sheep and a previously unreleased song from Nelly, who appears in the game as a playable character, along with the other members of the St. Lunatics. It also features instrumental beats from producer Just Blaze.

A feature called Gamebreaker is included. When players fill up their gamebreaker meter, they have the option to either use a Gamebreaker One or save it for a Gamebreaker Two. Either way, once they use it, their team will earn more points and the opposing team will lose points. However, if players or the opposing team takes too long, they will lose their gamebreaker. If the opposing team saves their Gamebreaker, players they can use their Gamebreaker to cancel theirs.

=== Game modes ===
There are four modes in the game.

Pick Up Game - In this mode, players are able to play against the computer, or another user. They can also choose to turn the shot clock off.

NBA Challenge - In this mode players have to play against a series assigned teams in various regional courts. In NBA Challenge, players are able to unlock NBA Legends as well as courts, and reward points.

Be a Legend - This is the main mode in the game. In this mode, players create a baller, create a team and try to succeed by going from being a nobody to becoming the Street Legend champ. In order to do that, they have to gain a reputation by playing pick up games that are assigned on the map, which will lead to tournaments against street legends. The higher a player's reputation goes, the more competition they get. Also in this mode, players get to unlock the street legend characters, courts, jerseys, trick moves and their own created player. They will also earn a nickname based on their skills.

Street School - This mode teaches players how to play the game. The mentor is street ball legend Stretch Monroe, who will teach 26 lessons.

== Reception ==
Reception

Aggregate scores
Aggregator	Score		
Aggregator	GameCube	PS2	Xbox
GameRankings	89.36%	90.16%	88.91%
Metacritic	88/100	90/100	89/100

Review scores
Publication	Score		
Publication	GameCube	PS2	Xbox
BBC Sport	93%	93%	93%
The Village Voice	N/A	8/10	N/A

The game received positive reviews upon release. GameRankings and Metacritic gave it a score of 90% and 90 out of 100 for the PlayStation 2 version; 89% and 88 out of 100 for the GameCube version; and 89% and 89 out of 100 for the Xbox version.

BBC Sport gave the game a score of 93% and said, "The atmosphere of NBA Street is enhanced by an excellent soundtrack including hip-hop tracks from the likes of Nelly and Nate Dogg, plus various sound effects from the street - traffic, sirens, crowd abuse, etc." Maxim gave it a score of eight out of ten and said, "even if you aren't a hoops fan, there's plenty of unintentional humor to appreciate: Seeing Yao Ming dunk on Bill Walton alone is worth the price of admission." The Village Voice gave the PS2 version eight out of ten, saying, "The up-to-four-player game itself is hot to death."

During the 7th Annual Interactive Achievement Awards, the Academy of Interactive Arts & Sciences nominated NBA Street Vol. 2 for "Console Action Sports Game of the Year", which was ultimately given to SSX 3.
