= Truveo =

Video search engine

Truveo, Inc.
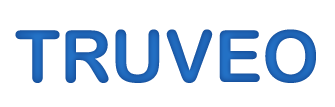
- Company type: Subsidiary of Oath Inc.
- Website type: Video search engine
- Available in: Multilingual
- Founded: 2004
- Headquarters: San Francisco, California, {{{location_country}}}
- Founders: Timothy Tuttle; Adam Beguelin
- Key people: Pete Kocks; Arnaud Mauvais; Moninder Jheeta; Kaveh Nafissi; Brett Barros; George Kola
- Website: www.truveo.com
- Registration: optional
- Launched: 2005
- Current status: Inactive

Truveo is a search engine for Web video, based in San Francisco and operated by Oath Inc. It was founded in 2004 by Timothy Tuttle and Adam Beguelin. Truveo launched its first commercial video search service in September 2005. Truveo was acquired by AOL in January 2006. The name Truveo is a combination of the modern French verb trouver (meaning "to find") and the Latin term video (meaning "I see").

In addition to operating its own search engine at truveo.com, Truveo powers video search on hundreds of websites including Microsoft websites, Sports Illustrated, Brightcove, CBS Radio websites, Qwest, CNET Search.com, CSTV, Excite, Flock, Infospace, Kosmix, Netvibes, Pageflakes, Widgetbox, and others.

Truveo claims to be one of the largest and most widely used video search engines, indexing over 600 million videos and reaching 75 million unique visitors every month across all websites it powers. As of March, 2008, the Alexa traffic ranking for the truveo.com website alone was about 600.

In 2008, Pete Kocks, Truveo's chief architect took over as general manager of Truveo. In December 2010, Truveo launched a new version of video search that included:

- TV Show search: An index of television shows linked to episodes and clips available on the web.
- Movie search: An index of movies linked to places to purchase, rent, or stream movies on multiple sites.
- Music video search: An index music artists linked to music videos featuring those artists on the web.
- Celebrity search: An index of celebrities linked to videos in which they appear.

The celebrity search feature uses a novel approach of detecting a person's vocal fingerprint to find when celebrities appear online. An overview of the technology is provided in this video.

As a Web-wide video search engine, Truveo competes with Google Video, Bing Video, and Blinkx among others. The site claims that its web crawling technology can find more videos and better metadata than conventional web crawlers for video.

As of 2018, the website redirects to Yahoo!.

== History ==
- Spring 2004: Truveo was founded by Timothy Tuttle and Adam Beguelin.
- September 2005: Truveo launches the first version of its Web-wide video search engine.
- January 2006: Truveo is acquired by AOL.
- Spring 2006: Truveo powers video search on AOL websites including AOL Video and AOL Search.
- September 2006: Truveo powers video search on Microsoft websites.
- September 2006: Truveo launches Developer Program and offers open APIs to developers worldwide.
- June 2007: Truveo reaches nearly 40 million monthly unique visitors and is adopted by hundreds of new partners.
- August 2007: Truveo relaunches the truveo.com website.
- Fall 2007: Truveo expands internationally into 16 countries.
- January 2008: Truveo grows to reach 50 million monthly unique visitors and expands index beyond 100 million videos.
- June 2008: Truveo launches its new website.
- December 2008: Truveo grows to reach over 73 million monthly unique visitors (source: comScore) and expands index beyond 300 million videos.
- June 2009: Truveo launches its new website.
- June 2010: Truveo launches new Facebook app that includes recommendations based on what your friends like.
- December 2010: After 2 years in development Truveo launches new video search engine including: video search, TV Show search, movie search, music video search, and celebrity search that uses voice recognition.

== International address ==
Country/Region	Websites	Language
Australia	https://web.archive.org/web/20080319120537/http://au.truveo.com/	English
United States	http://www.truveo.com/	English
