= NBA Street Homecourt =

2007 video game

- European cover featuring Carmelo Anthony
- Developer: EA Black Box
- Publisher: EA Sports BIG
- Producer: Dan Ayoub
- Designers: Todd Batty; Mike McCartney
- Programmer: Phil Harris
- Artist: Mike Young
- Composer: Andy Teal
- Series: NBA Street
- Platforms: PlayStation 3, Xbox 360
- Release: NA: February 20, 2007 (X360); NA: March 6, 2007 (PS3); AU: March 22, 2007; EU: March 23, 2007; JP: May 24, 2007
- Genre: Sports
- Modes: Single player, multiplayer

NBA Street Homecourt is a basketball video game developed by EA Black Box and published by Electronic Arts under the EA Sports BIG label. It is the final installment in the NBA Street series. The game was released for the Xbox 360 on February 20, 2007, and for the PlayStation 3 on March 6, 2007.

Carmelo Anthony, pictured during his tenure with the Denver Nuggets, is featured on the cover.

A demo for NBA Street Homecourt was released on February 2, 2007, on the Xbox Live Marketplace and PlayStation Store. It was also the first Xbox 360 game to be natively rendered in 1080p resolution.

== Gameplay ==
NBA Street Homecourt features real-life basketball courts that NBA superstars grew up on and used to hone their talents.

== Reception ==
NBA Street Homecourt received "favorable" reviews, according to review aggregator Metacritic. In Japan, where the game was ported for release on May 24, 2007, Famitsu gave it a score of 28 out of 40, while Famitsu X360 gave the Xbox 360 version one 8, one 9, and two 8's for a total of 33 out of 40. DaveMayCry of GamePro said that the Xbox 360 version "has solid superstar skills but it's lost a few of its sweet moves. The Street franchise is still a few tweaks away from true legend status." (Note: GamePro gave the Xbox 360 version 4/5 for graphics, 5/5 for sound, 4.5/5 for control, and 4.25/5 for fun factor.)

Sean Garmer of 411Mania gave the Xbox 360 version an 8.5 out of 10, saying, "I can for sure say this is the best NBA game EA has come out with in [the] 07 series. I don't know if that's because NBA Live and NCAA March Madness sucked so much, or it's because Homecourt is just that good? Either way, this game is tons of fun and online play will help it stay in your system a little longer. I can recommend this to just about anyone looking for a different take on Basketball or looking for a fun game to play with friends. I hope the next game is just as good as this one. The only drawback is the lack of modes, but if you got lots of friends that shouldn't be a problem."

The New York Times gave the game a favorable review and said that it "may bear only a passing resemblance to real basketball, but it is tremendous fun, even if you never have to the pass the game controller behind your back or toss it in the air." Detroit Free Press gave it three stars out of four and stated that "the high-flying super dunks, crazy-killer crossovers and behind-the-back, no-look and kick passes are exaggerated to new heights. And here lies one of the game's biggest pluses."

Reception

Aggregate score
Aggregator	Score	
Aggregator	PS3	Xbox 360
Metacritic	81/100	80/100

Review scores
Publication	Score	
Publication	PS3	Xbox 360
The A.V. Club	A	A
Electronic Gaming Monthly	9.17/10 (Note: Two critics of Electronic Gaming Monthly gave the game each a score of 9/10, and the other gave it 9.5/10.)	9.17/10
Eurogamer	N/A	7/10
Famitsu	28/40	(X360) 33/40; 28/40
Game Informer	8.75/10	8.75/10
GameDaily	N/A	8/10
GameRevolution	C+	C+
GameSpot	8/10	8/10
GameSpy	4/5	4/5
GameTrailers	N/A	9/10
GameZone	9/10	9/10
IGN	8.8/10	8.8/10
Official Xbox Magazine (US)	N/A	8.5/10
PlayStation: The Official Magazine	8/10	N/A
411Mania	N/A	8.5/10
Detroit Free Press	3/4	3/4
