= Third Screen Media =

US-based mobile advertising company

- Company type: Subsidiary of AOL
- Headquarters: United States
- Website: www.thirdscreenmedia.com

Third Screen Media is a mobile advertising company based in the United States. It was acquired by AOL on May 14, 2007.
