= Video search engine =

Web search engine for video content

A video search engine is a web-based search engine which crawls the web for video content. Some video search engines parse externally hosted content while others allow content to be uploaded and hosted on their own servers. Some engines also allow users to search by video format type and by the length of the clip. The video search results are usually accompanied by a thumbnail view of the video.

Video search engines are computer programs designed to find videos stored on digital devices, either through Internet servers or in storage units on the same computer. These searches can be made through audiovisual indexing, which can extract information from audiovisual material and record it as metadata, which will be tracked by search engines.

== Utility ==
The main use of these search engines is the increasing creation of audiovisual content and the need to manage it properly. The digitisation of audiovisual archives and the establishment of the Internet have led to large quantities of video files stored in big databases, whose recovery can be very difficult because of the huge volumes of data and the existence of a semantic gap.

== Search criterion ==
The search criterion used by each search engine depends on its nature and the purpose of the searches.

=== Metadata ===
Metadata is information about facts. It could be information about who the author of the video is, the date of creation, duration, and all the information that could be extracted and included in the same files. The Internet is often used in a language called XML to encode metadata, which works very well through the web and is readable by people. Thus, the easiest way to find data of interest to us is through the information contained in these files.

In the videos, there are two types of metadata that we can integrate into the video code itself and external metadata from the page where the video is. In both cases, we optimise them to make them ideal when indexed.

==== Internal metadata ====
All video formats incorporate their own metadata. The title, description, coding quality or transcription of the content are possible. To review these data exist programs like FLV MetaData Injector, Sorenson Squeeze or Castfire. Each one has some utilities and special specifications.

Converting from one format to another can lose much of this data, so check that the new format information is correct. It is therefore advisable to have the video in multiple formats, so all search robots will be able to find and index it.

==== External metadata ====
In most cases, the same mechanisms must be applied as in the positioning of an image or text content.

===== Title and description =====
They are the most important factors when positioning a video, because they contain most of the necessary information. The titles have to be clearly descriptive and should remove every word or phrase that is not useful.

===== Filename =====
It should be descriptive, including keywords that describe the video, with no need to see its title or description. Ideally, separate the words by dashes "-".

===== Tags =====
On the page where the video is, it should be a list of keywords linked to the microformat "rel-tag". These words will be used by search engines as a basis for organising information.

===== Transcription and subtitles =====
Although not completely standard, two formats store information in a temporal component that is specified, one for subtitles and another for transcripts, which can also be used for subtitles. The formats are SRT or SUB for subtitles and TTXT for transcripts.

=== Speech recognition ===
Speech recognition consists of a transcript of the speech of the audio track of the videos, creating a text file. In this way, with the help of a phrase extractor can easily search if the video content is of interest. Some search engines, apart from using speech recognition to search for videos, also use it to find the specific point of a multimedia file in which a specific word or phrase is located, and so go directly to this point. Gaudi (Google Audio Indexing), a project developed by Google Labs, uses voice recognition technology to locate the exact moment that one or more words have been spoken within an audio, allowing the user to go directly to the exact moment that the words were spoken. If the search query matches some videos from YouTube, the positions are indicated by yellow markers, and the user must pass the mouse over to read the transcribed text.

==== Speaker recognition ====
In addition to transcription, analysis can detect different speakers and sometimes attribute the speech to an identified name for the speaker.

=== Text recognition ===
The text recognition can be very useful to recognise characters in the videos through "chyrons". As with speech recognisers, there are search engines that allow (through character recognition) to play a video from a particular point.

TalkMiner, an example of searching for specific fragments from videos by text recognition, analyses each video once per second, looking for identifier signs of a slide, such as its shape and static nature, captures the image of the slide and uses Optical Character Recognition (OCR) to detect the words on the slides. Then, these words are indexed in the search engine of TalkMiner, which currently offers users more than 20,000 videos from institutions such as Stanford University, the University of California at Berkeley, and TED.

=== Frame analysis ===
Through the visual descriptors, we can analyse the frames of a video and extract information that can be scored as metadata. Descriptions are generated automatically and can describe different aspects of the frames, such as the colour, the texture, the shape, the motion, and the situation.

==== Chaptering ====
The video analysis can lead to automatic chaptering, using techniques such as a change of camera angle and identification of audio jingles. By knowing the typical structure of a video document, it is possible to identify starting and ending credits, content parts and beginning and ending of advertising breaks.

== Ranking criterion ==
The usefulness of a search engine depends on the relevance of the result set returned. While there may be millions of videos that include a particular word or phrase, some videos may be more relevant, popular or have more authority than others. This arrangement has a lot to do with search engine optimisation.

Most search engines use different methods to classify the results and provide the best video in the first results. However, most programs allow sorting the results by several criteria.

=== Order by relevance ===
This criterion is more ambiguous and less objective, but sometimes it is the closest to what we want; it depends entirely on the searcher and the algorithm that the owner has chosen. That is why it has always been discussed, and now that search results are so ingrained into our society, it has been discussed even more. This type of management often depends on the number of times that the searched word comes out, the number of viewings of this, the number of pages that link to this content and ratings given by users who have seen it.

=== Order by date of upload ===
This criterion is based totally on the timeline. Results can be sorted according to their seniority in the repository.

=== Order by number of views ===
This criterion sorts based on the popularity of each video.

=== Order by length ===
This criterion sorts videos by their duration.

=== Order by user rating ===
It is common practice in repositories to let the users rate the videos, so that content of quality and relevance will have a high rank on the list of results, gaining visibility. This practice is closely related to virtual communities.

== Interfaces ==
We can distinguish two basic types of interfaces: some are web pages hosted on servers which are accessed through the Internet and searched through the network, and the others are computer programs that search within a private network.

=== Internet ===
Within the Internet interfaces, we can find repositories that host video files which incorporate a search engine that searches only their own databases, and video searchers without a repository that search in external software sources.

==== Repositories with video searcher ====
Provides accommodation in video files stored on its servers and usually has an integrated search engine that searches through videos uploaded by its users. One of the first web repositories, or at least the most famous are the portals Vimeo, Dailymotion and YouTube.

Their searches are often based on reading the metadata tags, titles and descriptions that users assign to their videos. The disposal and order criterion of the results of these searches are usually selectable between the file upload date, the number of viewings or what they call the relevance. Still, sorting criteria are nowadays the main weapon of these websites, because the positioning of videos is important in terms of promotion.

==== Video searchers repositories ====
They are websites specialised in searching videos across the network or certain pre-selected repositories. They work by web spiders that inspect the network in an automated way to create copies of the visited websites, which will then be indexed by search engines, so they can provide faster searches.

=== Private network ===
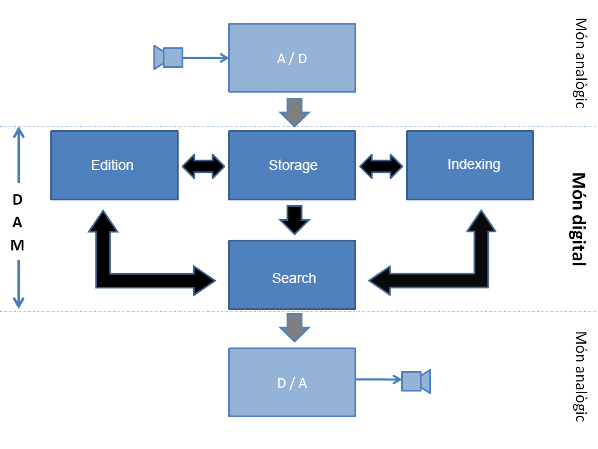
Functioning scheme

Sometimes a search engine only searches in audiovisual files stored within a computer or, as it happens in televisions, on a private server where users access through a local area network. These searchers are usually software or rich Internet applications with very specific search options for maximum speed and efficiency when presenting the results. They are typically used for large databases and are therefore highly focused on satisfying the needs of television companies. An example of this type of software would be the Digition Suite, which apart from being a benchmark in this kind of interfaces is very close to us as for the storage and retrieval files system from the Corporació Catalana de Mitjans Audiovisuals.

This suite integrates the entire process of creating, indexing, storing, searching, editing, and recovering content. Once audiovisual content is digitised, it is indexed using different techniques depending on the importance of the content and stored. When a user wants to retrieve a particular file, they fill in search fields such as program title, issue date, characters, or producer name, and the system initiates the search. Once results appear and are arranged according to preferences, the user can preview low-quality versions of the videos for faster access. When the desired content is found, it can be downloaded in higher quality for editing and playback.

== Design and algorithms ==
Video search has evolved slowly through several basic search formats which exist today, and all use keywords. The keywords for each search can be found in the title of the media, any text attached to the media and content linked web pages, also defined by authors and users of video-hosted resources.

Some video search is performed using human-powered search, while others create technological systems that work automatically to detect what is in the video and match the searcher's needs. Many efforts to improve video search, including both human-powered search as well as writing algorithms that recognise what is inside the video, have meant complete redevelopment of search efforts.

It is generally acknowledged that speech-to-text is possible, though recently Thomas Wilde, the new CEO of Everyzing, acknowledged that Everyzing works 70% of the time when there is music, ambient noise or more than one person speaking. If newscast style speaking (one person, speaking clearly, no ambient noise) is available, that can rise to 93%. (From the Web Video Summit, San Jose, CA, June 27, 2007.)

Around 40 phonemes exist in every language, with about 400 in all spoken languages. Rather than applying a text search algorithm after speech-to-text processing is completed, some engines use a phonetic search algorithm to find results within the spoken word. Others work by literally listening to the entire podcast and creating a text transcription using a sophisticated speech-to-text process. Once the text file is created, the file can be searched for any number of search words and phrases.

It is generally acknowledged that visual search in video does not work well and that no company is using it publicly. Researchers at UC San Diego and Carnegie Mellon University have been working on the visual search problem for more than 15 years, and admitted at a "Future of Search" conference at UC Berkeley in spring 2007 that it was years away from being viable even in simple search.

== Video search engines ==
=== Agnostic search ===
Search that is not affected by the hosting of video, where results are agnostic, no matter where the video is located:

- blinkx was launched in 2004 and uses speech recognition and visual analysis to process spidered video rather than rely on metadata alone. blinkx claims to have the largest archive of video on the web and puts its collection at around 26,000,000 hours of content.
- CastTV is a Web-wide video search engine that was founded in 2006 and funded by Draper Fisher Jurvetson, Ron Conway, and Marc Andreessen.
- Munax released their first version of an all-content search engine in 2005 and powers both nationwide and worldwide search engines with video search.
- Picsearch Video Search has been licensed to search portals since 2006. Picsearch is a search technology provider that powers image, video and audio search for over 100 major search engines around the world.

=== Non-agnostic search ===
Search results are modified or suspect, due to the large hosted video being given preferential treatment in search results:

- AOL Video offers a video search engine that can be used to find videos located on popular video destinations across the web. In December 2005, AOL acquired Truveo Video Search.
- Bing video search is a search engine powered by Bing and also used by Yahoo! Video Search.
- Google Videos is a video search engine from Google.
- Tencent Video offers video search from Tencent.

== See also ==
- Content-based image retrieval
- Metadata
- Optical character recognition
- Search engine optimization
- Speech recognition
- Video browsing
- Video content analysis
