= Jamar Davis =

Personal information
- Nickname: The Pharmacist
- Nationality: (United States) American
- Born: 1984; Bronx, New York, United States
- Height: 5 ft 7 in (1.70 m)
- Weight: 185 lb (84 kg)

Sport
- Sport: Basketball
- Event: Streetball
- Team: Chicago Rock Stars; AND1 Mixtape Tour (2003–06); Ball4Real (2007–08)

Jamar Davis, also known as "The Pharmacist", is an American streetball player from Mount Vernon, New York. He is best known for his appearances on the AND1 Mixtape Tour, which aired on ESPN. On the streets of Mt. Vernon, Davis honed his streetball talents, primarily at his home court, 4th Street Park. In 2001, while playing in Rucker Park in New York City for Team Ruff Riders, he received his streetball name "The Pharmacist" from Hannibal (the Rucker MC) because his dribbling skills seemed "morphine based."

In a 2003 contest, Davis, playing on the East Coast Team against the AND1 team, proved himself a very useful point guard, with his array of passing and dribbling skills. He was invited back to play AND1 again in 2004 in the New York game, where he memorably pulled Philip "Hot Sauce" Champion's jersey off his back, while keeping control of the ball. That move landed him an invitation to play in the 2004 International AND1 Mixtape Tour in November. He later earned an AND1 contract.

Davis has also played in the 2003–04 Pro League in Engelwood, New Jersey as part of Team Uptown, where he averaged over twenty points and eight assists. In 2005, Davis defended streetball's growing reputation, as some critics said that it was "hurting" the proper game of basketball. Davis said:

"It’s not teaching kids bad habits, because you’ll see that most of us that’s doing tricks like that, where kids will go to the court and do it and get called on, we don’t do that. We do what kids can do in a regular game that don’t get called on. We’re not carrying the ball; we’re not walking; we’re not double-dribbling; we just playing. Our hands is fast like that when you think we doing something that’s wrong."
