= Streetball in Puerto Rico =

Popularity of basketball in Puerto Rico

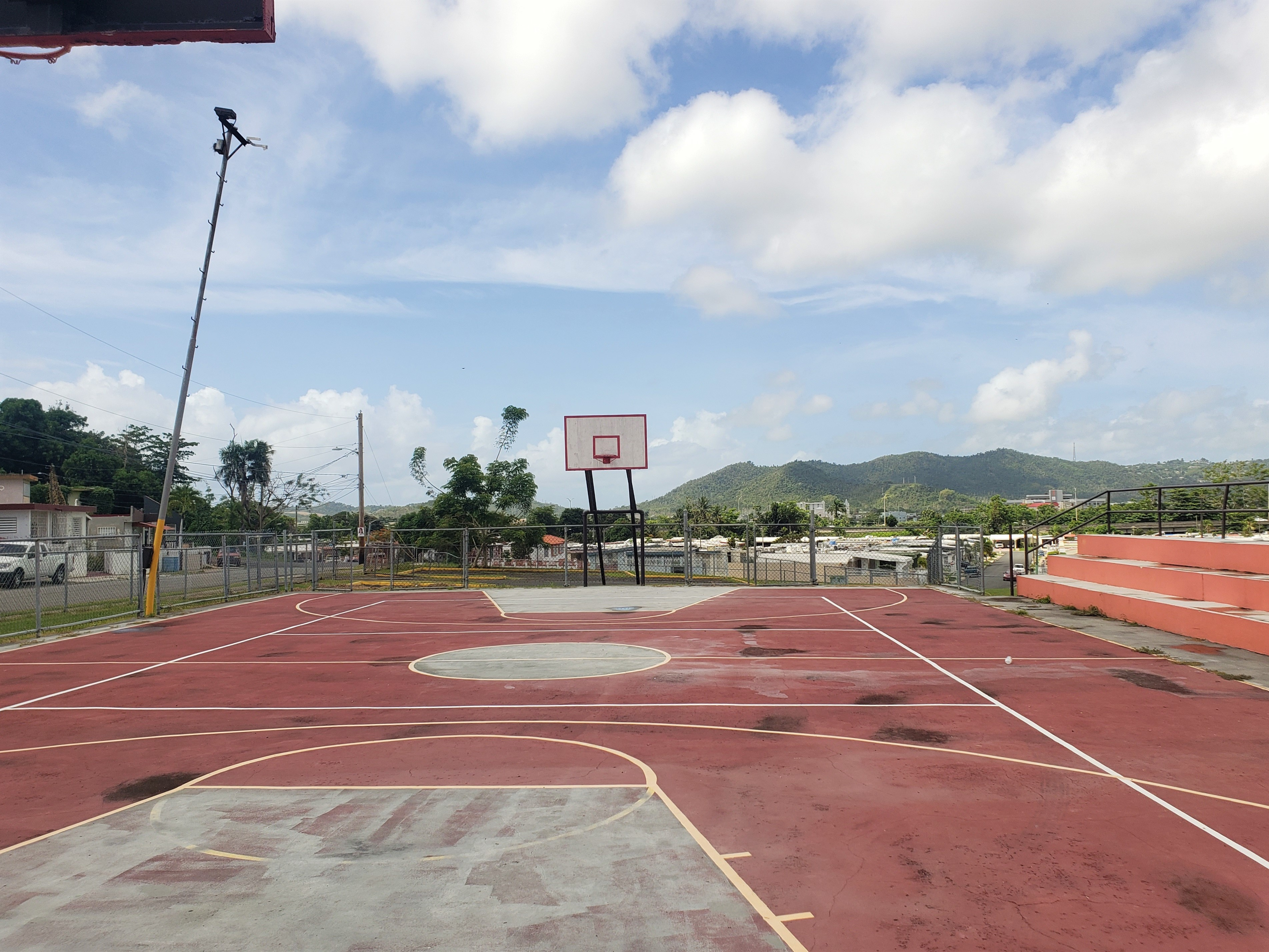
Basketball court in Urb. Los Rosales, Mabú barrio, Humacao

Linked to the popularity of basketball in Puerto Rico, the recurrence of streetball (street basketball) has become intertwined with the practice of the sport in all of its levels. Taking influence from the grassroots connection of Nuyorican streetballers to the Baloncesto Superior Nacional, the practice is widespread in Puerto Rico, with impromptu games being a highly common occurrence for decades. Organized streetball gained momentum in the early 2000s and soon became involved with the local urban culture, especially the hip hop and reggaeton industries, giving origin to teams like Puerto Rico Streetball and the Puerto Rico Streetballers. Organizations based in Puerto Rico have played against foreign competition, with the results including the first win of an international team over the prominent AND1 Live Tour Team. Teams native to the archipelago are affiliated to the Street Basketball Association and FIBA's 3x3 basketball program.

== Nuyorican streetball ==
=== Grassroots and the NY–BSN connection ===
Initially, the Puerto Ricans arriving to New York as part of the great 1940s-50s migration were spurned by pre-established ethnic groups, which was also reflected when they attempted to practice basketball along players with these backgrounds. However, this soon changed when players developed in the courts of the local neighborhoods began distinguishing themselves due to their skills. The player credited with establishing a connection between New York basketball and Puerto Rico is Héctor Blondet, who began to practice it during his teens at Fort Green. At the Rucker Basketball Tournaments he played against players including Kareem Abdul-Jabbar, Nate "Tiny" Archibald, Dean Meminger and Connie Hawkins. Fernando Torres, who had experienced this discrimination was also among the first two players to break the "natives only" rule of the main professional league in Puerto Rico, the Baloncesto Superior Nacional along Blondet. The two had been recruited by the Capitanes de Arecibo, but the league refused to allow the signing until the matter was taken to court. Following his arrival to the BSN, Blondet established a bolder style of playing the sport, earning the nickname of "El Mago" (Spanish for "The Magician") due to his passing and overall abilities. It was Blondet who ultimately opened the doors to Nuyorican players with his unorthodox streetball-inspired skills. He soon joined the Puerto Rico men's national basketball team, becoming an Olympian. This created a surge and a group of Nuyorican players that later came to be known as "Los Tres Reyes" (Spanish for "The Three Kings"): Raymond Dalmau, Rúben Rodríguez and Neftalí Rivera.

Rubén Rodríguez quickly ascended in his native Brooklyn. His ability was noticed by coach Butch Purcell, who wanted him to play along Julius Erving at the Rucker. Rodríguez was brought to the BSN by the Vaqueros de Bayamón, a team that pioneered the tendency of bringing players from the New York diaspora to play in the archipelago. After gaining prominence in the BSN, he was among the first players to join the team following the end of the "Nuyorican barrier" in the late 1960s and early 1970s, which served as the spearhead to an influx of players to the program. The second member of the triad was Neftalí Rivera, who brought his own shot from the courts of New to the BSN. "El Tornillo" (Spanish for "The Corkscrew"), was a 360° 35-feet jumpshot that gained a fame as "the unblockable shot" in the BSN and was effectively used by Rivera, who established a pre-three-point line BSN record of 79 points in a single game that still stands. Rivera also joined the national team. The last member of "Los Tres Reyes" was Raymond Dalmau, who though born in Puerto Rico, was raised in the Grant Projects, learning to play from several places, including the Patterson Projects in the Bronx. He intentionally choose to stay in the BSN instead of joining the Utah Stars of the American Basketball Association in order to remain eligible to play in the national team, where he went on to become a star player. Dalmau played all of his professional career for the Piratas de Quebradillas. The success of Blondet and "Los Tres Reyes" in the BSN and national program had a significant impact in the Latin American communities in New York, particularly in the mostly Puerto Rican Spanish Harlem, which sparked a wave of interest in basketball. White Park became the main outdoor court for the diaspora, there pickup games featuring players from all ages became extremely popular, often counting with the participation of players such as Torres. All of the attention evolved into the Hispanic Superior Basketball, where Nuyorican streetballers were the main source of talent.

From this uproar emerged César Fantauzzi, who became the most prominent player in Spanish Harlem, where he earned his nickname "Spanish Doc" after capturing a jump shot attempt in midair. Fantauzzi entered the BSN with the Atléticos de San Germán earning a reputation as a power dunker and shot blocker, eventually following the footsteps of the other prominent Nuyoricans into the national basketball team, but his participation was brief for unrelated problems. Another player to gain fame during this time was Ángel "Ángelo" Cruz, who gained notoriety playing in the concrete courts of the Patterson Houses in Mott Haven. Known for his dribbling and dunking abilities, he was also recruited to play in the BSN, where he became part of the Indios de Canóvanas and made the national basketball team. Cruz was instrumental in bringing Andrés "Corky" Ortíz, a product of streetball raised on 117th off Madison, where he played against some of Rucker Park's legends, to the Gigantes de Carolina. Cruz was eventually joined in the Canovánas Indios by Bronx-native Héctor Olivencia, who had developed by playing pick up games in Rucker Park and the Webster Projects, who had entered the BSN when he was only 16 years old with the Criollos de Caguas. Born in Puerto Rico but raised in New York, Alfred "Butch" Lee became the most prominent Nuyorican player of the 1970s. He played constantly in the Rucker Park court, where he grew up watching the older players and getting involved in pick-ups, 5–2 and 1-on-1 full court games to hone his skills until he became a well rounded player. He was the first Puerto Rican selected in the NBA Draft and the first one to win an NBA championship ring (in 1980, as a member of the Lakers.) Lee joined the BSN in 1976 for the Cardenales de Río Piedras. who won the league championship that year. He was also the starting point guard in the Puerto Rico basketball team in the 1976 Montreal Olympics. Lee was a star at Marquette, leading that team to the NCAA championship in 1977. In 1978, he turned pro after being selected in the first round of the NBA draft by Atlanta. His NBA career was cut short by injuries, and he retired in 1981. At that point, he returned to the Puerto Rico basketball league where he played for a few more years, but due to the rules at the time, he couldn't play for the Puerto Rico national team because he had lost his amateur status.

Another Nuyorican raised in the Bronx was Georgie Torres, who began playing at the Mitchell Projects, gaining a fame as a sharpshooter that extended throughout his BSN and national team career. Torres was originally brought to the league when Olivencia discovered that he was Puerto Rican, but ended playing in 26 seasons throughout the 1980s and 1990s. Serving as opposite to these players was Wes Correa, born in Queens and who began to play in a makeshift basket made with a bicycle rim attached to a telephone post, before moving on to take on some of New York's best players. He was recruited to the Mets de Guaynabo by Earl Brown and four years later gained prominence in the national team by scoring 36 points in a game against the United States, which had Michael Jordan, Patrick Ewing and Chris Mullin in their lineup. Correa returned to New York in 2001 and played his first game at Rucker Park, where he has continued to perform gaining his nickname "Wil' Wild" Wes. The late 1980s brought James Carter to the BSN. From Queen and raised in the Baisley Projects in Southside Jamaica, he was told to tryout for the BSN while playing in a game in Brooklyn. Joining the Brujos de Guayama, Carter earned the nickname "El Presidente" and established himself in the national program.

=== The Urban Culture Renaissance ===
In 1987, Bobbito García, also known as "Kool Love Bob", was playing a streetball game against Ray Díaz at Goat Park. Díaz, who had played in the BSN from 1982 to 1984 with the Piratas de Quebradillas, saw potential in the young García, recommending him to the office of the Capitanes de Arecibo. García gained experience in the BSN, becoming only the second player from his school to play professionally, and returned to play college. Upon returning to New York, García became instrumental in the streetball reinvention of the 1990s. García has also served as the announcer of CBS Sports-Red Bull's King of the Rock one-on-one tournament. In 1988 he began working for Def Jam Records, where he met DJ Stretch Armstrong beginning a DJ career that became tied to the Hip Hop scene in New York and led to international presentations as a club DJ. Gracía combined his interests in music and basketball, becoming the announcer and host of several streetball events, while also continuing to perform as a player. A published author and photographer, he became the co-founder of Bounce in 2003', a magazine which promotes streetball, urban fashion and professional basketball. He remained in the publication's staff until 2009, working on the creation of several special volumes along the regular issues. García has consistently continued to promote and practice streetball and basketball in general. Among his related work is the 2001 Nike Hip Hoop Tour, halftime shows for six universities and several NBA teams and coaching basketball programs in New York, the SEEDS Grow the Game Outreach Program and '10 Hoops for Hope. As a player, he has also been part of more than half a dozen teams, including some events that took place in Puerto Rico, such as the 2005 Playground Pros Revenge Tour. Behind the cameras, García is the co-director of the documentary Doin' It In The Park: Pick-Up Basketball, NY.

Another Hip Hop figure that became involved in streetball is Nuyorican rapper Fat Joe, who created the Terror Squad Team, which participates in the New York Summer Leagues. Danny Reyes' Red Eye NYC Street Ballers are a recurrent participant in the Hoops and Music Del País and have traveled to Puerto Rico several times. The 1990s also saw the arrival of more Nuyorican talents in Larry "El Exterminador" Ayuso and Danny Tirado. Ayuso, who became involved with basketball in the Bronx, was forced into playing streetball for money. Upon returning to New a York on vacation, Ayuso played a pickup game against "Master Rob" and Kerry "Curry Goat" Thompson. Ayuso joined the BSN in 1996 and became the national team's shooting guard during the late nineties and throughout the 2000s, peaking at the 2006 FIBA World Championships, where he scored 62% from the three-point range. Though he did not play in the BSN, Joe "Pops" Cruz contributed to the sport by establishing the HITS project, which has since served as showcase for several streetballers. Tim "Headache" Gittens, autodenominated as the "Jackie Robinson of Street Basketball" is another Nuyorican to heavily influence the practice, becoming one of the first players to innovate the discipline, giving birth to modern playground wildstyle. Growing up in New York, he established himself by winning the Holcombe Rucker Memorial and Nike Pro-City, earning his nickname by scoring 30 points in a game held at Ajax Park. He later played in the BSN for the Brujos de Guayama. Gittens was also involved in the creation of the original AND1 Team, being one of the first two players signed, along Waliyy "Main Event" Dixon.

The 2000s brought shooting guard Rick Apodaca, who also began playing streetball in New York and New Jersey, but did not adopt a nickname. He followed the route of the players that preceded him, entering the BSN and earning a spot in the national basketball team. However, unlike them, Apodaca remained attached to streetball and kept on practicing it. A career shooting guard, Apodaca also began playing streetball in New York and New Jersey, but did not adopt a nickname during his youth. In 2005, he was sponsored by urban clothing and apparel brand K1X, which gave him the nickname "Open Bar". In 2007, Apodaca played for the K1X Streetball Team in substitution of Corey "Homicide" Williams, scoring 18 points in a 58–56 victory. After opening his participation by scoring four consecutive shots, the game's announcer nicknamed him "Instant Offense". He continued to play at Kingdome throughout that summer. Apodaca rejoined the team for the 2008 HITS All-Star Game, which the K1X All-Stars won 110–106. He closed this year by accepting a challenge issued by Bobbito García to compete in a three-point contest held in New York, which also included "Homicide". Carmelo Anthony is half-Puerto Rican and raised in the Red Hook Projects, where he began practicing the sport in the asphalt streets and concrete courts, entering the I.S. Tournsment in Sunset Park among others. Anthony eventually earned the nickname "Little New York". Even though he decided to represent the United States, he still honors his father Carmelo Iriate, a former BSN player, by wearing a tattoo of the flag of Puerto Rico in his shooting hand. He has continued prompting the discipline, organizing 3-on-3 tournaments. Anthony later visited his father's homeland, paying for the restoration of the old school concrete streetball court of La Perla in San Juan, Puerto Rico among other projects.

Corey Fisher also began his career as a streetballer, competing in Rucker and Dyckman. In 2004, a former BSN player for the Maratonistas de Coamo and Tiburones de Aguadilla, as well as Long Island University's guard, Ray "X-Ray" Rivera, suffered a car accident, which gravely injured one of his legs. Despite being told that his career was over, Rivera was encouraged to continue by a close friend named Paul Rivera. The following year, he was invited to give a speech at Gaucho Gym and the crowd's response inspired him to return. Rivera soon organized his own streetball team, PR Pride, along Paul, Ira Miller, Danny Basile, Shannod "JFK" Burton, John Oliver and former Dyckman Most Valuable Player and 3-point challenge champion Eric Opio. Their first game was against the Dominican Power team. The following year, PR Pride entered the Kingdome Winter Classic, the Hoops in the Sun tournament and Dyckman, defeating a Luis Flores-reinforced Dominican Power team in their home court with Ray Rivera scoring 37 points. In 2007, PR Pride entered the Tri State Classic and focused in establishing a fanbase in Orchard Beach, which hosts the Hoops in the Sun Classic. The team was completed with Apodaca, Jason Windgate, Bobby Santiago and former NBA players Kenny Satterfield and Andre Barrett. In 2008, the team had adopted a fast-paced offensive, setting a HITS record by scoring 178 points in a standard game, including 68 points scored by Satterfield. Newcomer Shagari Alleyene set a record on his own, blocking 17 blocks.

=== The emergence of the Nietos ===
The 2010s opened with the arrival of Renaldo "Taz" Balkman, also known as "Kool", "Plasticman" and "The Incredible Balk", to the national basketball team. However, he followed a different path after his beginnings in the courts of New York, being drafted in the first round of the NBA draft without playing in the BSN. Balkman commonly participates in streetball held events at New York, even joining the Tri State Classic and the Fireball Tournament, which notably featured him and Nate Robinson in a game between the NYAC and Brooklyn United. Maurice "Moe" Harkless followed the blueprint set by Balkman, being drafted 15th in the 2012 NBA draft, only a few months after being recruited by the Federación de Baloncesto de Puerto Rico (Spanish for "Basketball Federation of Puerto Rico") and without any participation in the BSN. Jerron Love, a Bronx born point guard has participated in tryouts for the youth national basketball program. Love had not been involved in the sport until his father, Jerry Love, noticed his handling while casually bouncing a ball. It was his father who recruited a local streetballer name Ángel, who frequented a playground in the Bronx, seeking help in training him. Ángel accepted to teach him for $5, but Love mastered the streetballer's trick in a single 30-minute session. Outside of New York, the Puerto Rican diaspora has also produced prominent players, such as New Jersey's Mike Rosario, who was raised playing in the Lincoln Park court adjacent to his home at Harry Moore Housing Projects, eventually joining the senior national program while still a youth-aged athlete. Another player to gather the national program's attention in similar fashion was Massachusetts' point guard Shabbazz Napier.

== Native streetball ==
=== PR Streetball and PR Streetballers ===
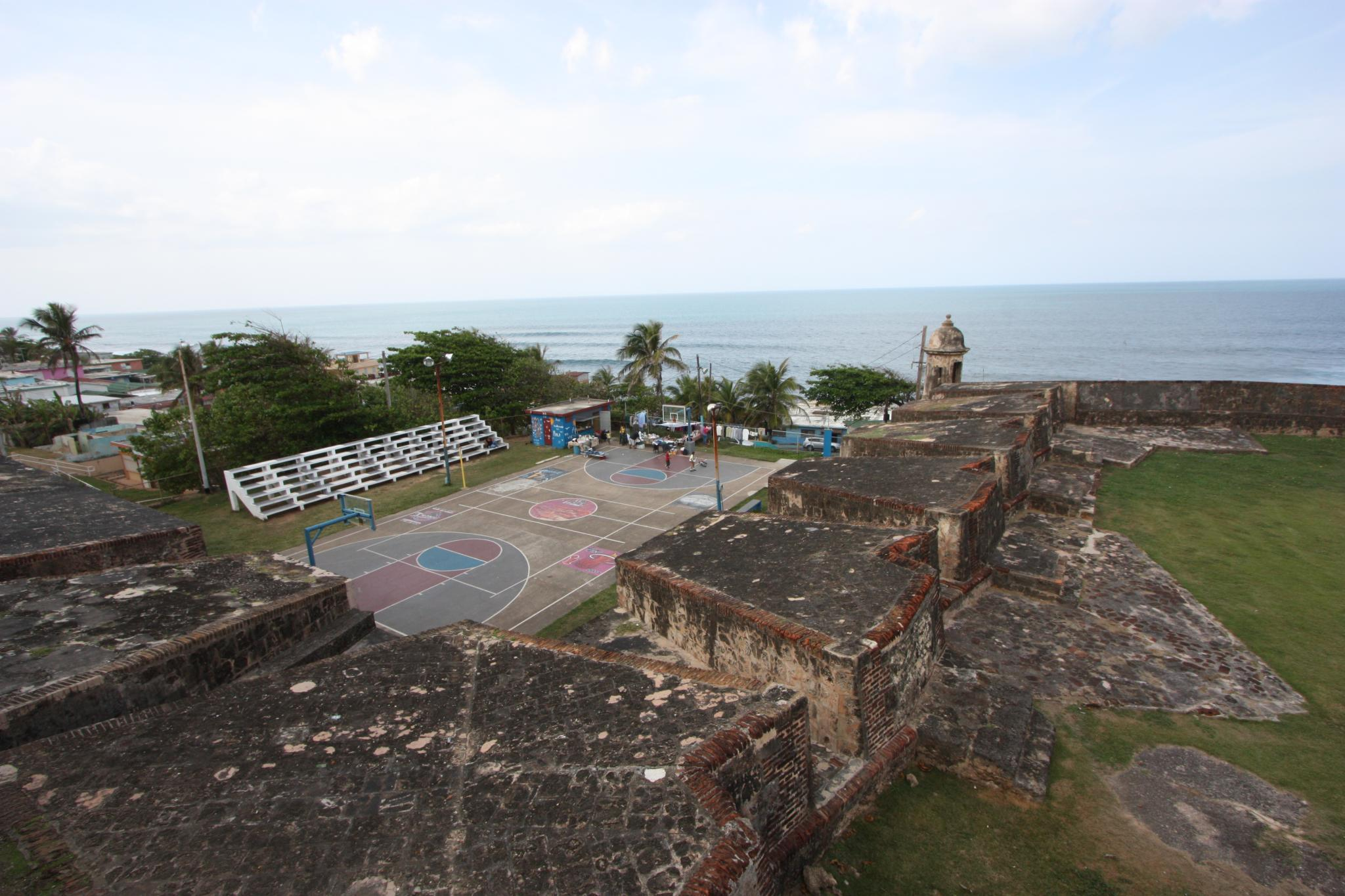
Basketball court, La Perla, San Juan, Puerto Rico

Most players in Puerto Rico begin their basketball careers by practicing informal and rule-less variations of the sport while concurrently attending a youth program, in some cases even serving as scouting ground for players. Twenty-one, pickups, 3-on-3, skills challenges and even dunking contests are commonly practiced throughout the archipelago. The local streetball courts have produced prospects that have entered the youth national programs, including players such as Jonathan Vélez, developed at Bayamón's Santa Juanita district in an outdoor court named "La Díez", and Raymond Cintrón, who also grew playing in outdoor courts, reaching the prestigious Nike Global Challenge. However, the first attempt to merchandise the practice did not came until the early 2000s. In 2002, Puerto Rico Streetball became the first large scale team to be organized, after they held nationwide open tryouts to gather players. The members of the team adopted artistic pseudonyms traditional to Streetball, by which they are known publicly. Composed by a somewhat rotating roster, the featured players included "Dement", "Air Machine", "Inhuman", "Griffin", ".45", "Whippep Cream", "Fever" and "Fire". The team began offering exhibition games mostly focusing on low income areas and public housing projects such as Llorens Torres, Monte Hatillo, Canales, Puerta de Tierra and Los Cedros, also performing in other places such as La Perla, Vieques and several public schools throughout the main island's metropolitan region. The team became affiliated to the then-flourishing reggaeton movement, working along figures such as Daddy Yankee, Héctor "El Father", Julio Voltio and Baby Rasta among others.

This led to the publication of a DVD, Puerto Rico Streetball, Vol. 1 by Flow Music studio and Top Quality Sport Events on November 23, 2004, and featuring "Benny Boing", "Fever", "Dement", Jansy González also known as"Jancy" and "Master Yancy", "xUAx", "Nighmare", "Griffin", "Lighthouse", "Zoom", "MC Shaka", "Unico", "Crack", "JosephFire," ".45" and "Inhuman". The production was distributed by Universal Music. In 2005, Puerto Rico Streetball participated in an exhibition game against eventual Baloncesto Superior Nacional champions, Capitanes de Arecibo. Puerto Rico Streetball joined Don Omar prior to the 2006 Puerto Rican Day Parade, playing against the Terror Squad team. The Coca-Cola Company also sponsored the Sprite 3 pa' 3, a series of 3-on-3 streetball tournaments. Some months after the release of the DVD production, the established Team AND1 included Puerto Rico among the countries to be visited in their Mixtape World Tour. For this event, Puerto Rico Streetball incorporated some additional players, most notably Bobbito García and a number of walk-in streetballers. The game was contested under traditional streetball-rules and featured highlights from players in both sides, before being interrupted during the final stage and evolving into a dunk exhibition. The encounter was later described as "one of the best international games [ever] witnessed" by AND1 point guard, Grayson "The Professor" Boucher.

The game was later televised as an episode of Streetball on ESPN's 2006 "Global Invasion" season, which featured several other international games. Throughout the years, Puerto Rico Streetball has continued organizing shows on request, attending their usual locations. However, Puerto Rico Streetball suffered the loss of one of its original players and narrator "MC Shaka", otherwise known as "Get Low", following his untimely death. Individually, "Jancy" participated in the 2007 StreetGodz World Freestyle Competition. In 2011, Puerto Rico Streetball participated in the 2011 Torneo Carlos Arroyo, presented and hosted by Arroyo himself. Beginning that same year, the Federación de Baloncesto de Puerto Rico began organizing open 3-on-3 tournaments. The event is divided in four categories and rotates between the metropolitan area and other regions. Team AND1 revisited the archipelago on July 26, 2012, as part of their renamed Live Tour. Their opponents were the Puerto Rico Streetballers, which were making their debut and had José Juan Barea serving as their head coach and Alberto J. Lebron as the team's general manager. The local team had a roster mostly composed by BSN players including Renaldo Balkman, Alejandro "Bimbo" Carmona, Filiberto Rivera, Samuel "Sammy" Villegas, Andres "Corky" Ortíz, Jr., Juan Pablo Piñero, Leonel Batista, Enrique Ramos, Yuniel Pérez, Ismael Rivera, William Orozco and Miguel "Ali" Berdiel. Ortíz, Jr. had a connection to streetballing through his father, who was since returned and won the MVP of the 2006 Wounded Knee Legends Classic.

On the other hand, Team AND1 had a lineup of Dennis "Spyda" Chism, Robert "50" Martin, Alonzo "Amazing" Miles, Brandom "Werm" LaCue, Guy "Easy J" Dupuy, Marvin "Highrizer" Collings, Jamar "The Pharmasist" Davis, "Roscoe" Johnson and Andre "Silk" Poole, completed by “Big Dave” and “Irv”. The game was organized by a charity entity known as Power of Positive Parents in Sports (POPPS), which is managed by president Albert Lebron and general manager Alberto J. Lebron. The score remained close throughout the game, with one on one defense being dominant and players from both teams displaying showmanship. The Puerto Rico Streetballers led the score entering the final minutes, with Team AND1 advancing to close the scores but ultimately failing to overtake the Puerto Rican team, which won 88 to 85. Filiberto Rivera was named the game's MVP. Team AND1 had just closed a tour of East Africa victorious, entering the game undefeated in six years of playing globally, with Puerto Rico Streetballer's win being its first lost to an international team and fourth overall. Sprite brand held a 1-on-1 tournament on September 29–30, 2012, the De Tr3s Pa'l All-Star, which rewarded the six best streetballers that enter it with participation in the 2013 All-Star Game. The overall winner of the tournament was Joel Román.

== Formal competition and influence ==
=== SBA and Streetball Puerto Rico ===
Puerto Rico is a member of the Street Basketball Association's International Street Basketball Federation, which promotes streetball worldwide. One of only two SBA sanctioned members between North and Central America, along the United States, they are joined by Ecuador, Sueden, Sudan and Scandinavia in the ISBF. As a member of the SBA, Puerto Rico automatically qualifies to the SBA Street Ball World Cup. This variant of the sport was formally organized into the Streetball Puerto Rico City Tour league in 2013. This entity hosts summer and winter tournaments in several age categories. The rise of 3x3 basketball in Puerto Rico has also benefited from the long-standing tradition of this form of basketball, both in style and by contributing players and teams that participate in the FIBA 3x3 World Tour, of which Team San Juan was the first champion.

=== In popular culture ===
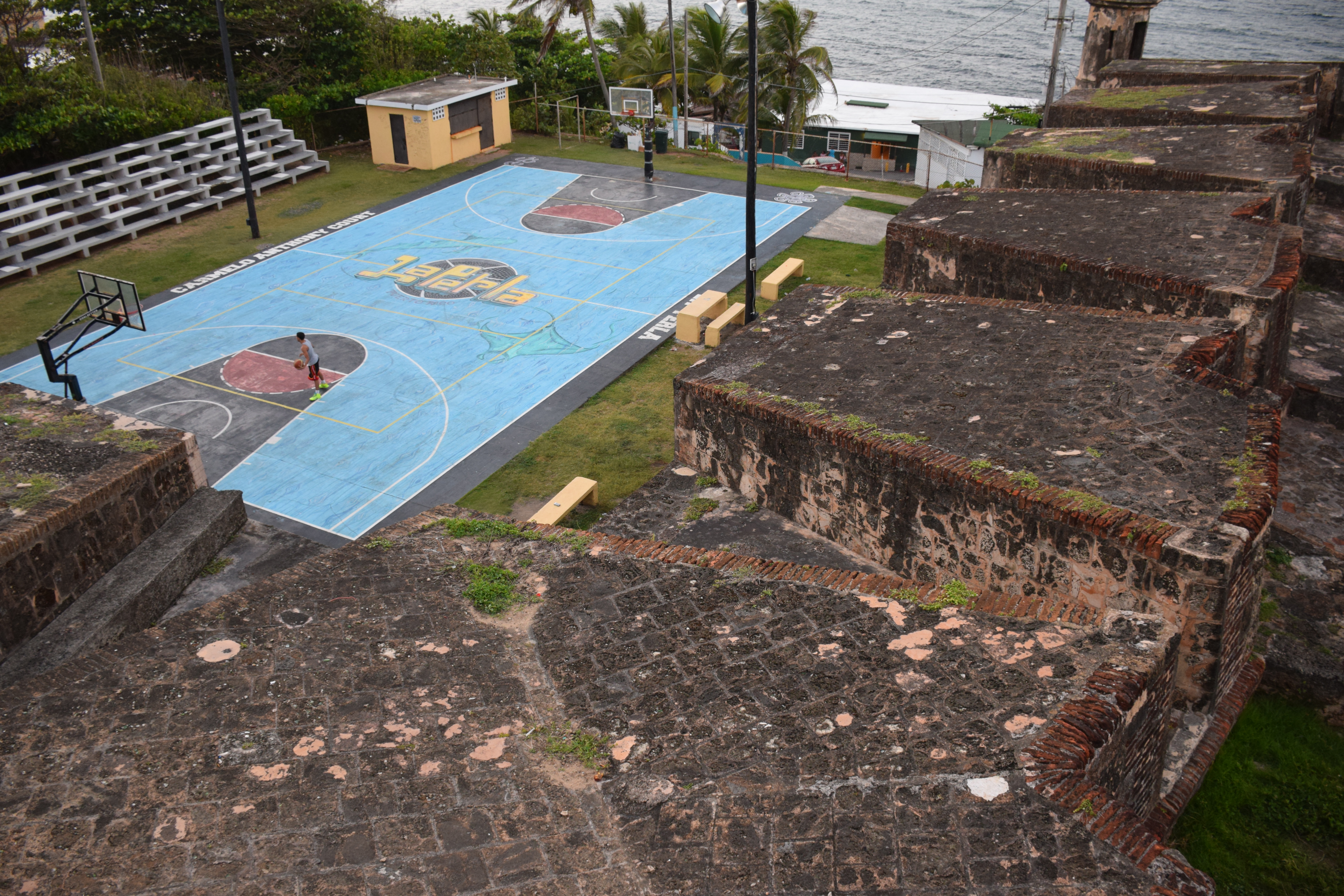
Basketball court in La Perla in Old San Juan

The eleventh city featured in AND 1 Streetball, as well as the first of the "Global Invasion" international stages, is Parque Damaso Rosa in Luquillo, Puerto Rico. Beginning in 2005, the AND1 brand began working along Puerto Rico national team captain, Carlos Arroyo, who had gained prominence in the Spanish ACB and NBA professional leagues. With the company, the FIBA All-Olympic point guard promoted clothes and shoes, also displaying his streetball skills as part of a video interview for their Global Invasion DVD. He reprised his role by performing in the brand's AND1 Mixtape X: The United Streets of America production. Arroyo himself was featured in NBA Street Vol. 2 as the point guard of the Utah Jazz. Carmelo Anthony made appearances in NBA Street V3, NBA Street Showdown and NBA Street Homecourt wearing the uniform of the Denver Nuggets. Bobbito García served as announcer and host for this series and the NBA 2K franchise's dunk contest feature.

In August 2015, it was published that a feature-length documentary was being produced about the influence that Puerto Rican players from New York City had upon basketball on the Island. The documentary entitled, Nuyorican Básquet, focuses on the Puerto Rico men's national basketball team of the 1979 Pan American Games in San Juan, in which 8 of the 12 players were from New York or neighboring areas. These were: Angelo Cruz, Raymond Dalmau, Georgie Torres, César Fantauzzi, Charlie Bermudez, Nestor Cora, Roberto Valderas, & Michel Vicens. Other members of that team were: Rubén Rodríguez, Ángel "Cachorro" Santiago, Willie Quiñones, Mario Morales and Flor Meléndez, coach, and Julio Toro, assistant coach. The documentary directors are Julio César Torres and Ricardo Olivero Lora, it was completed during 2016 and released the following year.

Streetball has also evolved into an urban fashion trend. The first shoe to prominently feature the flag of Puerto Rico were the Nike Air Force 1 Puerto Rican Flag edition, released in 1999 and invented by Mike Parker, who was inspired by the Nuyorican players that crowded Rock Steady Park and New York's Puerto Rican Day Parade. The design was a hit and sparked a fashion trend which has since bern followed by numerous brands, including AND1, PUMA and Reebok. Nike itself has since released several more models, including personalized editions, as well as Jordan Brand's Melo label, which honors Carmelo Anthony's roots on apparel released on a yearly basis prior to the Puerto Rican Day Parade. With reggaeton losing some of its popularity during the late 2000s, the practitioners of the discipline have experienced some obstruction by the mainstream media, which has adopted the term "streetball", used interchangeably along "guerilla gameplay", as a derogative manner to describe a league or FIBA game in which one or both teams disregards systemic basketball and defense, instead relying heavily on guards penetrating the baseline seeking layups, run and gun style and excessive three-point shots.

== See also ==
- Sports in Puerto Rico
- History of basketball
- Juan "Pachín" Vicéns
- Basketball at the 2004 Summer Olympics
