= Taurian Fontenette =

American basketball player (1983–2026)

Personal information
- Nicknames: Air Up There; Mr. 720
- Born: 1983 Hitchcock, Texas, U.S.
- Died: November 2, 2026 (aged 43)
- Height: 6 ft 2 in (1.88 m)
- Weight: 185 lb (84 kg)

Sport
- Sport: Basketball
- Event: Streetball
- College team: UTEP (2000–01); Richland College (2001–04); Paul Quinn College (2004–05)
- Team: AND1 Mixtape Tour (2005–06); Ball4Real (2007–08); Dallas Generals (2009)
- Turned pro: 2005

Taurian J. Fontenette (1983 – November 2, 2026), also known as "Air Up There" and "Mr. 720", was an American streetball player from Hitchcock, Texas. He was a player on the AND1 Mixtape and Ball4Real Tours. He was 6'2" tall and weighed 185 pounds. Fontenette attended Hitchcock High School (class of 2000) and attended three different colleges: UTEP in 2000–01, Richland Junior College in 2001–04, and Paul Quinn College in 2004–05. His original streetball name was "Air Up There", but due to naming rights claimed by AND1, he went by "Mr. 720", "Birdman", "The Human Pogo Stick", "Your Highness", and "Way Up There".

As his nickname implies, Fontenette was best known for his leaping and dunking ability. During the AND1 game in Houston, Texas, in 2006, Fontenette stunned fans by performing the first ever widely documented 720-degree dunk. Video clips of the feat were shown on ESPN's SportsCenter and also had been widely distributed over the internet.

== Professional career ==
=== Dallas Generals (2009) ===
Fontenette signed a contract to play for the Dallas Generals of the American Basketball Association in 2009. However, the team folded in January 2010.

== Death ==
Fontenette died on November 2, 2026, at the age of 43.
