= Street Hoops =

2002 video game

- Developer: Black Ops Entertainment
- Publisher: Activision
- Platforms: PlayStation 2, GameCube, Xbox
- Release: PlayStation 2, Xbox: NA: August 13, 2002; EU: October 4, 2002; GameCube: NA: November 26, 2002
- Genre: Sports
- Modes: Single-player, multiplayer

Street Hoops is a streetball video game released in 2002. It was developed by Black Ops Entertainment and published by Activision for PlayStation 2, GameCube, and Xbox. This is the first AND1 video game featuring real life streetballers such as 1/2 Man 1/2 Amazing and Hot Sauce. It is possible to create custom ballers, and play on real life courts. The game has 3 different modes: World Tournament, Lord of the Court, and Pick-up Game.

== Gameplay ==
=== World Tournament ===
In this mode of gameplay, the players team travels across the U.S. to take on teams at various courts. There are unlockable, new courts, secret courts, and better, more skilled ballers. This is the story mode of the game. There are some things that players have to pay to unlock, and there are even more things that players have to beat the mode several times to unlock. This is a 1-Player mode, with the ability to have other human players on a player's teams. However, the earning from this mode will only be saved to the progress of the first user. Progression through the mode is through the first player, as well. Other human players merely serve as teammates from game to game.

=== Lord of the Court ===
This mode of play is the opposite of the World Tournament mode. The controlling player plays as the home court and other teams come to challenge them. If the controlling player can keep everybody off their "turf", they can unlock streetball movies, secret characters and clothes. This is a 1-Player mode, with the ability to have other human players on the controlling player's teams. However, the earning from this mode will only be saved to the progress of the first user. Progression through the mode is through the first player, as well. Other humans players merely serve as teammates from game to game.

=== Pick-Up Game ===
This is the exhibition mode of the game. The player can choose to play either a full or half court game, on the court and with the teams of their choosing-provided that they are already unlocked through World Tournament. This is the game's multiplayer mode. In this mode, every user on the winning team will earn $100 per game.

== Reception ==
Reception

Aggregate score
Aggregator	Score		
Aggregator	GameCube	PS2	Xbox
Metacritic	56/100	62/100	58/100

Review scores
Publication	Score		
Publication	GameCube	PS2	Xbox
Electronic Gaming Monthly	N/A	6.5/10	N/A
Game Informer	N/A	5.5/10	5.5/10
GamePro	N/A	4.5/5	4.5/5
GameRevolution	N/A	D	D
GameSpot	4.2/10	4/10	4/10
GameSpy	2.5/5	1.5/5	2/5
GameZone	5/10	7/10	7.1/10
IGN	6.5/10	6.7/10	6.7/10
Nintendo Power	3/5	N/A	N/A
Official U.S. PlayStation Magazine	N/A	3.5/5	N/A
Official Xbox Magazine (US)	N/A	N/A	6.9/10
Entertainment Weekly	N/A	B	B
Maxim	N/A	8/10	8/10

The game received "mixed" reviews on all platforms according to video game review aggregator Metacritic.
