= NBA Ballers =

2004 video game

- PAL cover art featuring Stephon Marbury
- Developer: Midway
- Publisher: Midway Sports
- Series: NBA Ballers
- Engine: RenderWare
- Platforms: PlayStation 2, Xbox
- Release: PlayStation 2: NA: April 5, 2004; AU: April 14, 2004; EU: October 15, 2004; Xbox: NA: April 5, 2004
- Genre: Sports (basketball)
- Modes: Single-player, Multiplayer

NBA Ballers is a 2004 streetball simulation video game developed and published by Midway. The game features fictional NBA analyst Bob Benson (voiced and depicted by Terry Abler) and MC Supernatural as the commentators. A majority of the moves in the game were from amateur basketball players, who provided some of their moves for the game. Stephon Marbury is on the cover. A version for GameCube was also planned but was never released.

The game has been considered similar to AND 1 Streetball and the NBA Jam series, of which it is a spiritual successor. The game was followed by a version for the PlayStation Portable, NBA Ballers: Rebound and two sequels, NBA Ballers: Phenom and NBA Ballers: Chosen One.

== Game ==
The game also maintains the "player on fire" feature that is in many sports games published by Midway.

While most matches are one-on-one, it is also possible to have an extra player, where three players in total play individually against each other. The matches are two minutes long, and the winner is the best of three rounds. A round is won when a player scores 11 points, and the winner must win by at least two points. If time runs out, the player with the most points will be declared the winner of that round. As the player pulls off style moves, they earn points that fill the jackpot bar at the top left of the screen. When a player scores, they earn the accumulated jackpot.

=== Juice Meter ===
The meter fills up like a fuel gauge, and it is used at the turbo boost meter. It is the player's energy.

=== House Meter ===
The meter fills up by pulling off style moves and scoring points. The meter is filled until the word "HOUSE" is spelled. When fully charged, the player can "Bring Down the House" by holding all shoulder buttons and throwing an alley-oop to themselves, which tears down the rim and ends the match.

=== Single-player mode ===
Rags to Riches is the main story mode in which the player portrays a relatively unknown rookie with certain abilities who must take on the best players in the NBA to become arguably the greatest player in the association. Each match is done in tournament style, and the player must defeat every opponent to advance to a new tournament to move the story along, and various Attributes rise during progression.

This game mode featured a full story told over 21 different cut scenes as the player progressed throughout the game. With the inclusion of this game mode, NBA Ballers became the first video game officially licensed by a league to contain a story mode.

== Reception ==
Reception

Aggregate score
Aggregator	Score	
Aggregator	PS2	Xbox
Metacritic	83/100	82/100

Review scores
Publication	Score	
Publication	PS2	Xbox
Computer Games Magazine	A	A
Electronic Gaming Monthly	8/10	8/10
Game Informer	8/10	8/10
GamePro	4/5	4/5
GameSpot	8.3/10	8.2/10
GameSpy	3/5	3/5
GameZone	7.5/10	7.8/10
IGN	9/10	8.9/10
Official U.S. PlayStation Magazine	4/5	N/A
Official Xbox Magazine (US)	N/A	6.5/10
Playboy	75%	75%
The Village Voice	8/10	N/A

The game received "favorable" reviews on both platforms according to the review aggregation website Metacritic. GameSpot named it the best PlayStation 2 game of April 2004. It received a runner-up position in GameSpot's 2004 "Best Alternative Sports Game" award category across all platforms, losing to Mario Power Tennis.

Maxim gave it a score of eight out of ten and stated that "Eighty-four hyper-detailed players are represented, or you can create your own baller and go rags-to-riches, racking up pimp-wear and Scarface-worthy real estate." The Village Voice similarly gave the PS2 version eight out of ten and stated, "Like the sport itself, you can easily start a pickup game, or put all your time—and high hopes—into it. Playing D, of course, isn't nearly as fun." Playboy gave the game 75% (nearly two months before its U.S. release date) and said, "Victory is accompanied by flashy jewelry, fancy cars, and the truest measure of a champ, a larger pose."

During the 8th Annual Interactive Achievement Awards, the Academy of Interactive Arts & Sciences nominated NBA Ballers for "Console Action Sports Game of the Year" and "Outstanding Achievement in Original Musical Composition".

By July 2006, the PS2 version of the game had sold 670,000 copies and earned $23 million in the United States. Next Generation ranked it as the 94th highest-selling game launched for the PlayStation 2, Xbox, or GameCube between January 2000 and July 2006 in the U.S. Combined sales of the NBA Ballers series reached 1 million units in the United States by July 2006.
