= AND 1 Streetball =

2006 video game

- AND1 cover athletes AO, The Professor and Main Event.
- Developer: Black Ops Entertainment
- Publisher: Ubisoft
- Platforms: PlayStation 2, Xbox, Mobile phone
- Release: Mobile: NA: March 15, 2006; PlayStation 2, Xbox: NA: June 6, 2006; AU: August 31, 2006; EU: September 1, 2006
- Genres: Sports, Basketball
- Modes: Single-player, multiplayer

AND 1 Streetball is a streetball video game for PlayStation 2 and Xbox, developed by Black Ops Entertainment and published by Ubisoft. The game was released on June 6, 2006, in conjunction with the AND1 Mixtape Tour. A scaled-down, mobile version of the game, developed by Gameloft, called "And1 Street Basketball" was also released.

While not the first game to feature AND 1 players, AND 1 Streetball is officially licensed by the company, and includes the 2005 AND1 roster as well as Duke Tango, AND1's MC for its annual Mix Tape Tours.

The game features a story mode mirroring the "And1 Streetball" series on ESPN, where players are able to create their own basketball player and enter him in the AND1 Mix Tape Tour in order to get a contract with the AND1 team. Along the way, players are able to create their own stylized trick moves and pull them off with a two-analog stick system called "I BALL."

The PlayStation 2 version supports multiplayer via multitap and GameSpy, while the Xbox version includes Xbox Live support including voice chat.

== Reception ==
Reception

Aggregate scores
Aggregator	Score		
Aggregator	mobile	PS2	Xbox
GameRankings	N/A	53%	49%
Metacritic	N/A	51/100	46/100

Review scores
Publication	Score		
Publication	mobile	PS2	Xbox
1Up.com	N/A	C+	C+
Electronic Gaming Monthly	N/A	4.83/10	4.83/10
GamePro	N/A	2/5	2/5
GameRevolution	N/A	D	D
GameSpot	N/A	4.7/10	4.7/10
GameTrailers	N/A	5.3/10	5.3/10
GameZone	N/A	6/10	4.5/10
IGN	7.9/10	4.1/10	4.1/10
Official U.S. PlayStation Magazine	N/A	2.5/5	N/A
Official Xbox Magazine (US)	N/A	N/A	7.5/10
Detroit Free Press	N/A	1/4	1/4
The Sydney Morning Herald	N/A	2.5/5	2.5/5

The PlayStation 2 version received "mixed" reviews, while the Xbox version received "generally unfavorable reviews" according to video game review aggregator Metacritic.
