= Troy Jackson (basketball) =

American basketball player (1973–2011)

Personal information
- Nickname: Escalade
- Born: January 11, 1973 Queens, New York, U.S.
- Died: February 20, 2011 (aged 38) Los Angeles, California, U.S.
- Height: 6 ft 10 in (2.08 m)
- Weight: 375 lb (170 kg)

Sport
- Sport: Basketball
- Event: Streetball
- College team: Louisville (1996-1998)
- Team: AND1 Mixtape Tour

Troy Jackson (January 11, 1973 – February 20, 2011) was an American basketball player. The younger brother of retired NBA player Mark Jackson, he was a member of the AND1 Mixtape Tour, known by his streetball nickname "Escalade". Jackson was listed by AND1 at 6'10" and 375 pounds.

== Biography ==
Troy Jackson weighed close to 500 pounds (227 kg) as a senior at Hills East High School in Long Island, New York, but his performances at Rucker Park caught the attention of Bill Hughley, coach of Wallace Community College in Selma, Alabama. Jackson enrolled at Wallace, and even though he continued to play at 500 pounds (or more), he received all-region honors as a sophomore. "People wonder how I played at 500-plus pounds. But to me it felt natural," he later said. Jackson's accomplishments in community college led to a scholarship offer from the University of Louisville, though the school demanded that he lose weight. Jackson complied, and by his senior year at Louisville, he had slimmed down to about 363 pounds (165 kg) after adhering to a strict diet.

Jackson only played twenty games for Louisville over two years, averaging 3.0 points per game and 1.6 rebounds per game in a reserve role. However, he became well known to basketball fans through the AND1 Mixtape Tour, a traveling streetball exhibition which he joined in 2002. With the AND1 Tour, Jackson used the nickname Escalade, a reference to the Cadillac SUV. His teammate Antwan "8th Wonder" Scott told the Herald Sun, "He's a big guy, but he can entertain and he can seriously play." Jackson appeared on the cover of Sports Illustrated and was described as a "streetball legend" by the magazine Jet.

== Personal life ==
Off the basketball court, Jackson worked as an advocate for STD prevention. He died in his sleep of hypertensive heart disease on February 20, 2011.
