= Mark Jackson =

American basketball player and coach (born 1965)

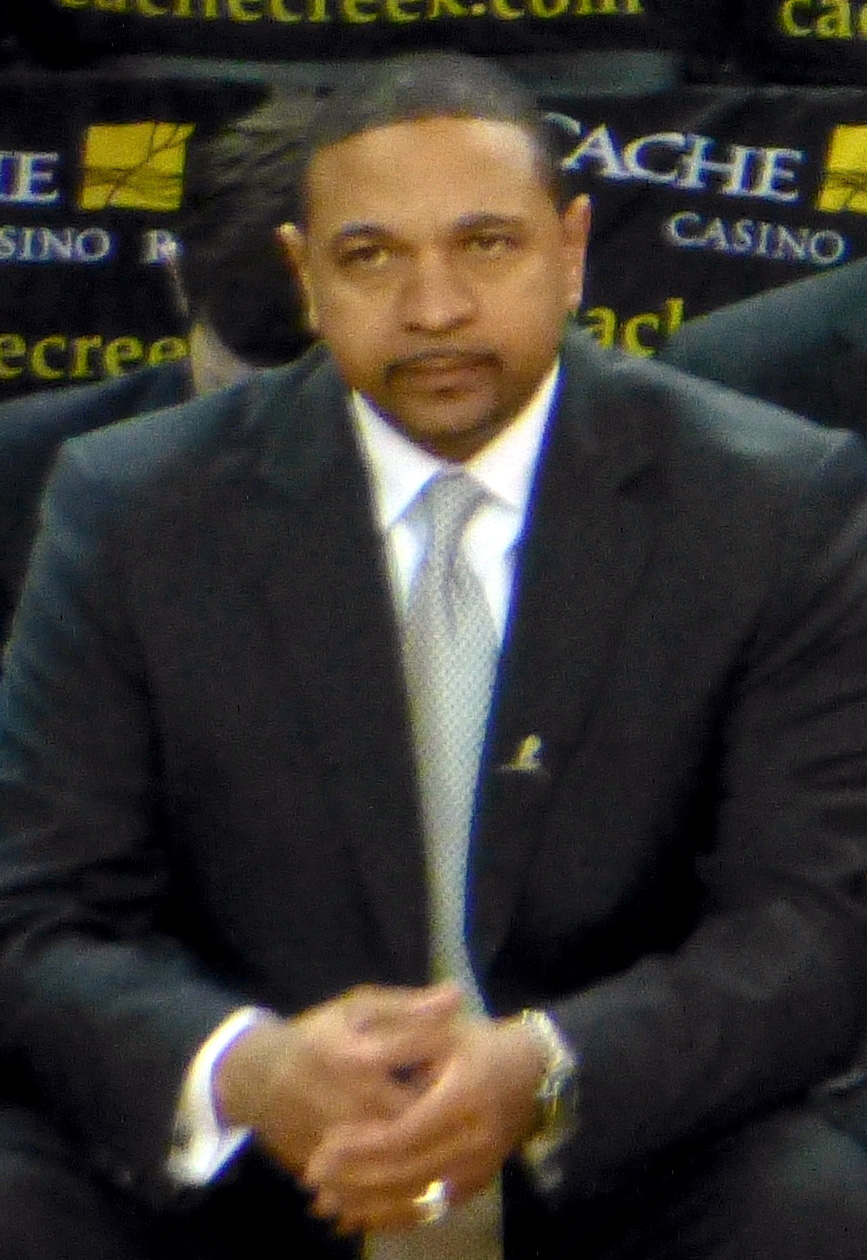
- Jackson coaching the Golden State Warriors in 2013

Personal information
- Born: April 1, 1965 (age 61) Queens, New York, U.S.
- Listed height: 6 ft 3 in (1.91 m)
- Listed weight: 195 lb (88 kg)

Career information
- High school: Bishop Loughlin (Brooklyn, New York)
- College: St. John's (1983–1987)
- NBA draft: 1987: 1st round, 18th overall pick
- Drafted by: New York Knicks
- Playing career: 1987–2004
- Position: Point guard
- Number: 13, 31
- Coaching career: 2011–2014

Career history

Playing
- 1987–1992: New York Knicks
- 1992–1994: Los Angeles Clippers
- 1994–1996: Indiana Pacers
- 1996–1997: Denver Nuggets
- 1997–2000: Indiana Pacers
- 2000–2001: Toronto Raptors
- 2001–2002: New York Knicks
- 2002–2003: Utah Jazz
- 2004: Houston Rockets

Coaching
- 2011–2014: Golden State Warriors

Career highlights
- NBA All-Star (1989); NBA Rookie of the Year (1988); NBA All-Rookie First Team (1988); NBA assists leader (1997); Consensus second-team All-American (1987); NCAA assists leader (1986); 2× First-team All-Big East (1986, 1987); Big East Defensive Player of the Year (1987); Haggerty Award (1987)

Career statistics
- Points: 12,489 (9.6 ppg)
- Rebounds: 4,963 (3.8 rpg)
- Assists: 10,334 (8.0 apg)
- Stats at NBA.com
- Stats at Basketball Reference

Mark A. Jackson (born April 1, 1965) is an American former professional basketball player who was a point guard in the National Basketball Association (NBA). He played college basketball for the St. John's Red Storm and was selected by the New York Knicks in the first round of the 1987 NBA draft with the 18th overall pick. He played in the NBA for the Knicks, Los Angeles Clippers, Indiana Pacers, Denver Nuggets, Toronto Raptors, Utah Jazz, and Houston Rockets in a career spanning from 1987 to 2004.

After retiring from playing basketball, Jackson became a broadcast commentator for ESPN and ABC alongside his former coach Jeff Van Gundy and play-by-play man Mike Breen. He also worked as an analyst for YES Network's New Jersey Nets games. In 2011, the Golden State Warriors hired Jackson as head coach. He coached the team for three seasons, but was fired in 2014 despite leading the Warriors to consecutive playoff appearances for the first time in over 20 years. Following this, he returned to ESPN and continued working as a commentator until his removal in 2023.

== Early life ==
Mark Jackson grew up in the St. Albans neighborhood of Queens, New York City, New York. He was regarded as one of the nation's elite point guards in secondary school. Raised Catholic, he attended Bishop Loughlin Memorial High School in Brooklyn, New York City. He was a star player for the school's basketball team under coach Patrick Quigley. Jackson gained a reputation as a streetballer in New York.

== College career ==
Jackson was a college hoops star at St. John's University. While at St. John's, he played alongside Olympian and NBA All-Star Chris Mullin for two seasons. He credits Mullin with teaching him the importance of rigorous practice work in the gym.

While at St. John's, Jackson developed an unusual free-throw line ritual of extending his hand and "cupping" his thumb and index finger around the rim. This helped him stay focused on the rim while shooting foul shots. He continued this well into his pro career and it helped him to a career 77.0% free-throw percentage.

== Professional career ==
=== New York Knicks (1987–1992) ===
Jackson was the 18th pick of the 1987 NBA draft by the New York Knicks. He teamed with Patrick Ewing and Charles Oakley to turn the Knicks into a prime playoff team in the late 1980s and early 1990s. However, before the Knicks peaked and became regular playoff contenders, he was traded to the Los Angeles Clippers in 1992.

Jackson had a steady career with the Knicks, most notably under coach Rick Pitino, averaging 13.6 points and 10.6 assists per game in his rookie season, earning him the 1988 Rookie of the Year award, the lowest overall draft pick to win the award since Woody Sauldsberry in 1958. He was the only non-lottery pick to have won the award since the introduction of the system in 1985 until the 2016–17 season, where Malcolm Brogdon won the award as a second-round pick.

In 1989, Jackson had another promising season for the Knicks, teaming with Ewing to lead them to the Atlantic Division title and the number-two seed in the East (behind the eventual champion Detroit Pistons, whom they swept 4–0 in the regular season), and making his lone All-Star Game appearance. After sweeping Charles Barkley's Philadelphia team in the opening round, the Knicks faced the upstart Chicago Bulls, led by Michael Jordan, in the Eastern Conference semifinals. Near the end of Game 2, Jackson en route to a fast-break layup in the fourth quarter looked back and stuck out his tongue at Jordan before finishing the layup; Jordan responded with a 40+ PPG average the remainder of the series, and led Chicago to a 4–2 series victory.

Following a contract extension prior to the 1990 season, Jackson began to lose his All-Star form; the loss of Pitino (who left to coach the University of Kentucky) and starting the season out of shape were key factors. Consequently, he faced stiff competition from backup guard Rod Strickland, and after Strickland was traded away, Maurice Cheeks, to the point where, in their decisive first-round Game 5 against Larry Bird, Kevin McHale, Robert Parish, Dennis Johnson, and the Boston Celtics at the Boston Garden, Knick coach Stu Jackson benched Jackson for the entire game New York defeated Boston to advance to the second round, where they lost to the eventual champion Detroit Pistons in five games.

=== Los Angeles Clippers (1992–1994) ===
After the 1991–92 season, he was traded to the Los Angeles Clippers, a trade that saw Charles Smith and Doc Rivers go to the Knicks. This was a three-team deal with the Clippers also obtaining Stanley Roberts from the Orlando Magic for draft picks; Roberts had become superfluous in Orlando when the Magic won the draft lottery for his college teammate, Shaquille O'Neal). With the Clippers, Jackson teamed with Danny Manning, Ron Harper, and head coach Larry Brown to lead the Clippers to the second of their two consecutive playoff appearances. The Clippers would not reach the playoffs in consecutive years again until the 2011–2012 and 2012–2013 seasons.

=== Indiana Pacers (1994–1996) ===
On June 30, 1994, the Indiana Pacers traded Pooh Richardson, Malik Sealy, and draft rights to Eric Piatkowski for Jackson and draft rights to Greg Minor. With the Pacers, he teamed with Reggie Miller, Rik Smits, Antonio Davis, and Dale Davis for five out of the next six seasons to make Indiana a contender.

=== Denver Nuggets (1996–1997) ===
Jackson was traded to the Denver Nuggets before the 1996–97 NBA season for Jalen Rose.

=== Return to the Pacers (1997–2000) ===
The Pacers traded for Jackson and LaSalle Thompson at the trade deadline, giving up Vincent Askew, Eddie Johnson, and second-round picks in 1997 and 1998. Jackson's return sparked the Pacers, but they still missed the playoffs for the only time in a decade and a half.

Jackson appeared in his only NBA Finals as the Pacers' starting point guard in 2000, when they lost to the Los Angeles Lakers in six games.

=== Toronto Raptors (2000–2001) ===
Jackson left the Pacers that offseason for the Toronto Raptors, who needed a point guard and had extra money due to the departure of Tracy McGrady earlier that off-season. Antonio Davis recommended his former Pacers teammate as a suitable replacement. Jackson would only play 54 games for the Raptors before being traded back to the Knicks at the trade deadline.

=== Return to the Knicks (2001–2002) ===
Jackson was traded to the Knicks with Muggsy Bogues (who was later traded to the Dallas Mavericks without playing a game for the Knicks), for Chris Childs on February 22, 2001. Jackson became the starter at point guard for the rest of the season, playing in 29 games. He helped lead the Knicks to the fourth seed in the Eastern Conference, where they were knocked out of the playoffs by the Raptors.

Despite a solid individual season for Jackson the following year, the Knicks ended the 2001–02 season with a 30–52 record and out of the playoffs for the first time in 15 seasons. In the offseason, he was traded back to the Nuggets in a deal that included Antonio McDyess, after which Jackson was immediately waived.

=== Utah Jazz (2002–2003) ===
On October 2, 2002, Jackson signed with the Utah Jazz to serve as John Stockton's backup. It was this season that Jackson moved to second place on the list of all-time assist leaders behind Stockton. Jackson played all 82 games that season without starting one. Jackson reportedly caused friction and disputes in the Jazz locker room by attempting to persuade his teammates that he should become the team's starting point guard instead of Stockton.

=== Houston Rockets (2004) ===
On January 15, 2004, Jackson signed with the Houston Rockets, backing up Steve Francis. Jackson played in only 42 games as a Rocket and, experiencing a large drop-off in production, finished his career at season's end.

== Player profile ==
As of 2026 Jackson ranks seventh on the all-time assist list (10,334), 24th on the NBA all-time games list (1,296), 34th on the all-time steals list (1,608), 42nd on the all-time minutes played list (39,121), 225th on the all-time three-point field goals made list (734), and 197th on the all-time three-point field goal attempts list (2,213). He never achieved great individual success; despite winning Rookie of the Year in 1988, he made only one All-Star appearance in his career (1989).

Jackson is also notable for prompting an NBA rule change. In response to his penchant for backing down opposing point guards in the post for 15 or more seconds at a time, the league instituted the five-second back-to-the-basket violation, sometimes called the "Mark Jackson Rule", prohibiting an offensive player from dribbling with his back to the basket for more than five consecutive seconds when below the free throw line.

Jackson is also known for perfecting and increasing the popularity of the "teardrop" shot, which he often used over much larger defenders.

== Coaching career ==
=== Golden State Warriors (2011–2014) ===
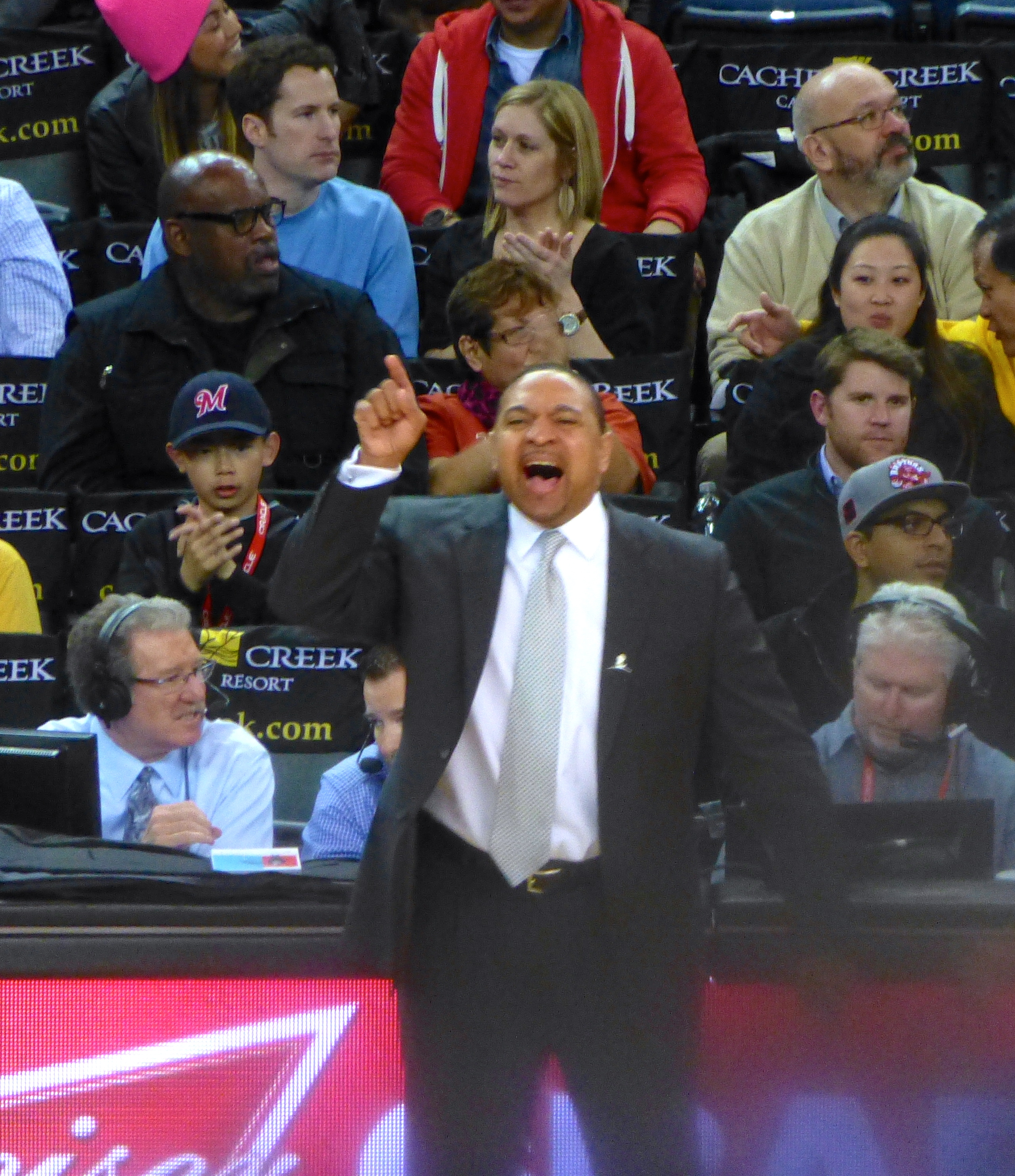
Jackson coaching the Warriors in 2013

On June 6, 2011, Jackson was hired as head coach of the Golden State Warriors. He was the first head coach hired by new owners Joe Lacob and Peter Guber. After inheriting a team that had made the playoffs just once in the previous 17 years, Jackson promised to turn the Warriors into a good defensive team and playoff contender. The Warriors struggled to a 23–43 record his first year during the lockout-shortened 2011–12 season as the team suffered several injuries to key players while adjusting to a new system.

In the 2012–13 season, with strong performance from Stephen Curry and Klay Thompson, Jackson led the Warriors to a 47–35 record and the sixth seed in the Western Conference. It was the first time the Warriors had made the playoffs since the 2006–07 season. The Warriors defeated the Denver Nuggets 4–2 in the first round, but lost to the San Antonio Spurs 4–2 in the conference semifinals.

Originally signed under a four-year, $8 million contract, Jackson earned two more years guaranteed on his contract in 2013, putting him under contract through 2014–15. The following season, the Warriors improved to 51–31, the team's first season with 50 or more wins since 1993–94. They reached the playoffs in consecutive seasons for the first time since 1992, but lost in the first round to the Los Angeles Clippers in seven games.

On May 6, 2014, Jackson was removed as head coach. The Warriors front office said the team was better than when Jackson arrived, but felt a different coach was needed to win an NBA championship. The following season, head coach Steve Kerr's Warriors won the team's first NBA title in 40 years.

Jackson's time as head coach of the Warriors was marred by allegations of intense religious rhetoric and homophobia. Jackson had reportedly ranted about two staff members who were openly gay.

== Broadcasting career ==
Jackson worked as an analyst for New Jersey Nets on YES Network, mostly with Marv Albert. He has also worked as an analyst for ABC, teaming with Mike Breen and former coach Jeff Van Gundy.

At the end of the 2008 NBA season, Jackson unexpectedly quit his position with the YES Network. This move fueled speculation that Jackson would be replacing Isiah Thomas as coach of the New York Knicks, but Jackson said the rumors were untrue and the decision was based on a desire to stop commuting from Los Angeles and his contract with ABC. Still, the rumors persisted until the Knicks hired former Phoenix Suns head coach Mike D'Antoni.

On May 17, 2014, Jackson reached a multiyear agreement to return to ESPN as a game analyst.

In May 2023, in the days following the announcement of Joel Embiid as the 2022–23 NBA MVP, but before the details of individual votes were known, there was public criticism—most notably by Charles Barkley on TNT's Inside the NBA—of the only voter (at that point still unnamed) who didn't include the Denver Nuggets center Nikola Jokić in his top five. As the NBA released the individual voting ballots, it was revealed that ESPN's analyst Jackson was that voter. Jackson immediately publicly apologized to the Nuggets and Jokić, stating his exclusion of Jokić was a mistake and that "Jokić is not only in the MVP discussion and deserved to be on my ballot but is one of the greatest players in the history of this game and a top-10 center of all-time".

Van Gundy and Jackson were let go by ESPN/ABC amid layoffs at the network on June 30 and July 31, 2023, respectively. Doc Rivers and Doris Burke replaced the pair on the lead broadcast team.

== Personal life ==
Jackson married singer and actress Desiree Coleman on July 29, 1990. They have four children. Jackson and Coleman divorced in 2017 after 27 years of marriage. His son, Mark Jackson Jr., played for the Manhattan Jaspers for the 2012–13 season after transferring from the University of Louisville.

He is the older brother of AND1 streetballer Troy Jackson, better known as "Escalade". Troy Jackson died on February 20, 2011, at age 38. Jackson is a Christian and a licensed minister.

Jackson is of partial Dominican descent, which qualified him to play for the national basketball team of the Dominican Republic. However, FIBA ultimately refused to allow him to be added to the roster.

=== Extortion scandal ===
In June 2012, Jackson revealed he had been the target of an extortion threat based on an extramarital affair and nude photos taken in 2006. Jackson said that he initially made payments of several thousands of dollars to a stripper and her accomplice to keep quiet about the affair and the photos, but when the alleged extortionists increased their demands, Jackson went to the FBI and ultimately the alleged conspirators were named in felony criminal complaints. "I recognize the extremely poor judgment that I used both in having an affair six years ago—including the embarrassing communication I exhibited during that time," said Jackson, "and in attempting to deal with the extortion scheme at first by myself."

== NBA career statistics ==
Legend
| GP | Games played | GS | Games started | MPG | Minutes per game |
| FG% | Field goal percentage | 3P% | 3-point field goal percentage | FT% | Free throw percentage |
| RPG | Rebounds per game | APG | Assists per game | SPG | Steals per game |
| BPG | Blocks per game | PPG | Points per game | **Bold** | Career high |
| * | Led the league |

=== Regular season ===
| Year | Team | GP | GS | MPG | FG% | 3P% | FT% | RPG | APG | SPG | BPG | PPG |
|---|---|---|---|---|---|---|---|---|---|---|---|---|
| 1987–88 | New York | 82 | 80 | **39.6** | .432 | .254 | .774 | 4.8 | 10.6 | **2.5** | .1 | 13.6 |
| 1988–89 | New York | 72 | 72 | 34.4 | .467 | .338 | .698 | 4.7 | 8.6 | 1.9 | .1 | **16.9** |
| 1989–90 | New York | 82* | 69 | 29.6 | .437 | .267 | .727 | 3.9 | 7.4 | 1.3 | .0 | 9.9 |
| 1990–91 | New York | 72 | 21 | 22.2 | **.492** | .255 | .731 | 2.7 | 6.3 | .8 | .1 | 8.8 |
| 1991–92 | New York | 81 | 81 | 30.4 | .491 | .256 | .770 | 3.8 | 8.6 | 1.4 | **.2** | 11.3 |
| 1992–93 | L.A. Clippers | 82 | 81 | 38.0 | .486 | .268 | .803 | 4.7 | 8.8 | 1.7 | .1 | 14.4 |
| 1993–94 | L.A. Clippers | 79 | 79 | 34.3 | .452 | .283 | .791 | 4.4 | 8.6 | 1.5 | .1 | 10.9 |
| 1994–95 | Indiana | 82* | 67 | 29.3 | .422 | .310 | .778 | 3.7 | 7.5 | 1.3 | **.2** | 7.6 |
| 1995–96 | Indiana | 81 | 81 | 32.6 | .473 | **.430** | .785 | 3.8 | 7.8 | 1.2 | .1 | 10.0 |
| 1996–97 | Denver | 52 | **52*** | 38.5 | .425 | .397 | .801 | **5.2** | **12.3*** | 1.0 | **.2** | 10.4 |
| 1996–97 | Indiana | 30 | **30*** | 35.1 | .427 | .316 | .766 | 4.1 | 9.8* | 1.5 | .1 | 9.0 |
| 1997–98 | Indiana | 82* | **82*** | 29.4 | .416 | .314 | .761 | 3.9 | 8.7 | 1.0 | .0 | 8.3 |
| 1998–99 | Indiana | 49 | 49 | 28.2 | .419 | .311 | .823 | 3.8 | 7.9 | .9 | .1 | 7.6 |
| 1999–00 | Indiana | 81 | 81 | 27.0 | .432 | .403 | .806 | 3.7 | 8.0 | .9 | .1 | 8.1 |
| 2000–01 | Toronto | **54***^{[a]} | **54*** | 33.4 | .422 | .345 | **.842** | 3.4 | 9.2 | 1.2 | .1 | 8.5 |
| 2000–01 | New York | **29***^{[a]} | **28*** | 27.1 | .411 | .310 | .529 | 4.1 | 5.6 | .7 | .0 | 5.9 |
| 2001–02 | New York | 82 | 81 | 28.9 | .439 | .405 | .791 | 3.8 | 7.4 | .9 | .0 | 8.4 |
| 2002–03 | Utah | 82 | 0 | 17.9 | .398 | .284 | .763 | 2.1 | 4.6 | .6 | .0 | 4.7 |
| 2003–04 | Houston | 42 | 3 | 13.7 | .340 | .171 | .718 | 1.7 | 2.8 | .4 | .0 | 2.5 |
| Career | | 1,296 | 1,091 | 30.2 | .447 | .332 | .770 | 3.8 | 8.0 | 1.2 | .1 | 9.6 |
| All-Star | | 1 | 0 | 16.0 | .600 | 1.000 | .500 | 2.0 | 4.0 | 1.0 | 1.0 | 9.0 |

- **^{a}** Due to a mid-season trade ended up playing a total of 83 games.

=== Playoffs ===
| Year | Team | GP | GS | MPG | FG% | 3P% | FT% | RPG | APG | SPG | BPG | PPG |
|---|---|---|---|---|---|---|---|---|---|---|---|---|
| 1988 | New York | 3 | — | **42.8** | .367 | .417 | .727 | 4.8 | 9.8 | **2.5** | .0 | 14.3 |
| 1989 | New York | 9 | — | 37.3 | **.510** | .393 | .679 | 3.4 | **10.1** | 1.1 | **.3** | 14.7 |
| 1990 | New York | 9 | — | 9.0 | .419 | .000 | .727 | .6 | 2.3 | .2 | .0 | 3.8 |
| 1991 | New York | 3 | 0 | 12.0 | .333 | — | — | .0 | 2.7 | .3 | **.3** | .7 |
| 1992 | New York | 12 | 12 | 30.7 | .402 | .190 | .815 | 2.3 | 7.2 | .8 | .0 | 8.3 |
| 1993 | L.A. Clippers | 5 | 5 | 37.6 | .438 | .500 | .864 | **5.8** | 7.6 | 1.6 | .2 | **15.2** |
| 1995 | Indiana | 17 | 17 | 32.5 | .454 | .400 | .739 | 5.2 | 7.1 | .8 | .0 | 9.9 |
| 1996 | Indiana | 5 | 5 | 37.2 | .353 | .222 | .765 | 5.0 | 6.0 | 1.2 | .0 | 10.6 |
| 1998 | Indiana | 16 | 16 | 30.9 | .417 | .378 | .794 | 4.6 | 8.3 | 1.4 | .0 | 9.2 |
| 1999 | Indiana | 13 | 13 | 34.7 | .495 | .412 | .714 | 4.5 | 8.6 | 1.1 | .1 | 11.2 |
| 2000 | Indiana | **23** | **23** | 27.6 | .392 | .313 | .903 | 3.7 | 7.7 | .8 | .1 | 8.1 |
| 2001 | New York | 5 | 5 | 31.2 | .500 | .250 | **1.000** | 5.2 | 5.2 | 1.6 | .0 | 9.0 |
| 2003 | Utah | 5 | 0 | 16.6 | .500 | **.556** | **1.000** | 1.0 | 3.2 | .6 | .0 | 7.2 |
| 2004 | Houston | 5 | 0 | 7.6 | .167 | .000 | — | .6 | 1.0 | .4 | .0 | .4 |
| Career | | 131 | — | 28.8 | .432 | .345 | .777 | 3.6 | 6.9 | 1.0 | .1 | 9.0 |

== Head coaching record ==
Legend
| Regular season | G | Games coached | W | Games won | L | Games lost | W–L % | Win–loss % |
| Playoffs | PG | Playoff games | PW | Playoff wins | PL | Playoff losses | PW–L % | Playoff win–loss % |

| Team | Year | G | W | L | W–L% | Finish | PG | PW | PL | PW–L% | Result |
|---|---|---|---|---|---|---|---|---|---|---|---|
| Golden State | 2011–12 | 66 | 23 | 43 | .348 | 4th in Pacific | — | — | — | — | Missed playoffs |
| Golden State | 2012–13 | 82 | 47 | 35 | .573 | 2nd in Pacific | 12 | 6 | 6 | .500 | Lost in Conference semifinals |
| Golden State | 2013–14 | 82 | 51 | 31 | .622 | 2nd in Pacific | 7 | 3 | 4 | .429 | Lost in First round |
| Career | | 230 | 121 | 109 | .526 | | 19 | 9 | 10 | .474 | |

== See also ==
- List of National Basketball Association career games played leaders
- List of National Basketball Association career assists leaders
- List of National Basketball Association career steals leaders
- List of National Basketball Association career turnovers leaders
- List of National Basketball Association career minutes played leaders
- List of National Basketball Association career playoff assists leaders
- List of National Basketball Association single-game assists leaders
