= Crossover (2006 film) =

- Theatrical release poster
- Directed by: Preston A. Whitmore II
- Written by: Preston A. Whitmore II
- Produced by: Frank Mancuso Jr.
- Starring: Anthony Mackie; Wesley Jonathan; Wayne Brady; Kristen Wilson; Lil' JJ; Philip Champion; Eva Pigford; Alecia Fears
- Cinematography: Christian Sebaldt
- Edited by: Anthony Adler
- Music by: Matthias Weber
- Production companies: TriStar Pictures; 360 Pictures
- Distributed by: Sony Pictures Releasing
- Release date: September 1, 2006
- Running time: 111 minutes
- Country: United States
- Language: English
- Budget: $5.8 million
- Box office: $7 million

Crossover is a 2006 American sports drama film. Crossover stars Anthony Mackie, Wesley Jonathan, Wayne Brady, Alecia Fears, Eva Pigford, Lil' JJ, Kristen Wilson, & AND1 streetball player Philip Champion in his film debut. It was written and directed by Preston A. Whitmore II and produced by Frank Mancuso Jr. Crossover was shot primarily in two cities in the United States, Detroit and Los Angeles. It was filmed between July 22, 2005, and August 28, 2005.

The film was released by Sony Pictures Releasing on September 1, 2006, and was panned by critics while grossing $7 million against a $5.8 million budget.

== Plot ==
Tech is the frontman of his streetball team (Enemy of the State) and he is determined to take down rival Jewelz (Philip "Hot Sauce" Champion) and his team Platinum. Before the game starts, Tech calls his friend Noah Cruise and convinces Cruise to participate in the game. Cruise is reluctant to play but Tech simply responds with "you owe me!", to which Cruise ends up agreeing to play. Enemy of the State loses the game and afterwards we see that although they are best friends, Tech and Cruise live in completely different environments. Cruise is a naturally talented basketball player who receives an athletic scholarship to UCLA. His mother has died and he has moved from a 7 Mile neighborhood in north Detroit to the prestigious Palmer Woods neighborhood to live with his grandmother. Although he is a skilled player, Cruise wishes to use his scholarship to become a medical doctor. Tech on the other hand, still lives in a run-down Detroit neighborhood where he has to help his mother pay for groceries and pay the bills.

During a day at work at Foot Locker, Cruise tells Tech that he has two tickets to his college's orientation in California and invites Tech. Tech then tries to give Cruise some money for playing in the game the night before but Cruise denies it, saying that he didn't play for money but instead to "return the favor" for Tech. Additionally, a girl named Eboni walks in and invites Tech to a tattoo party. While on their lunch break, sports agent and bookie Vaughn (who is the owner and overseer of the basketball games that Tech and his team play in) approaches Tech and Cruise in an attempt to persuade Cruise to join the NBA. Cruise has a reputation as one of the best basketball players in the state, so Vaughn tries to recruit Cruise at every chance he gets. Cruise mentions that he has no interest in the NBA and wants to be a Doctor after finishing college. Because of NCAA collegiate rules, a sports player cannot earn money from playing any outside sports. If they do, their scholarship is revoked. Vaughn mentions that Cruise could lose his scholarship off the fact that he played in the game the night before (as every player on the losing team still gets $1,000 each, which is what Tech tried to give Cruise earlier). Vaughn says that him not taking the money doesn't matter because Vaughn paid Tech and Tech paid the other members on the team. Cruise angrily leaves, but Tech calms him down and takes him to Eboni's party.

At the party, Eboni introduces Tech and Cruise to her friend Vanessa (Jewelz's ex-girlfriend). Vanessa and Cruise are instantly attracted to each other and start dancing. Tech tells Eboni his dreams about playing professional basketball and getting his GED. Tech never went to the 12th grade, as he went to jail for 4 months for assault. Cruise tells Vanessa about how he is going to California for college to become a doctor, and they kiss. Cruise goes behind Tech's back and gives his second ticket to the orientation trip to Vanessa instead. When he tells Tech about it, Tech is not upset because he also asked Eboni to go with him as well.

Days later, Cruise and Vanessa go out to dinner where she reveals she is pregnant, which excites Cruise. Vaughn arrives and unsuccessfully tries to convince Cruise to join the NBA, while Vanessa secretly agrees.

While in Los Angeles, Tech is performing in a commercial that he was offered from a casting director. After the shoot is done, one of the workers tells Tech that he is not going to be in the commercial and that the work he did was simply stunt-double work. Vanessa and Cruise have lunch where Cruise proposes to Vanessa and out of excitement, she asks him if he is going to play in the NBA. Cruise tells Vanessa the true reason why he would rather be a doctor. The night Cruise's mother died, a doctor at the hospital recognized him and said how he loved watching Cruise play basketball. Cruise laments the doctor's lack of concern over Cruise's mother, and says that after that night of his mother's death, basketball stopped being important to him. Vanessa reminds Cruise that Vaughn will tell the media that Cruise played in one of his illegal basketball games. But Cruise reminds her that since he didn't play for money, Vaughn wouldn't gain anything from telling.

Back at their hotel, Tech is still frustrated that he won't be in the commercial. He gets into an argument with Eboni, accusing her of not really liking him and only using him because he offered her a trip to Los Angeles. Eboni slaps Tech and tells him that she actually does like him. Cruise and Vanessa arrive and start arguing with Tech, which ends with Vanessa telling Tech that the only reason he is friends with Cruise is out of jealousy. It is revealed that Tech was sent to jail for 4 months because when he and Cruise were at a party, Cruise drunkenly assaulted a wealthy man. Tech took the blame for Cruise and went to jail instead. Tech then returns to Detroit on his own without Cruise, Vanessa and Eboni.

Back in Detroit, Tech goes to a basketball court to clear his mind, and Cruise arrives to apologize. Tech mentions that what Vanessa said in the hotel was true and that he is jealous of Cruise because he has "the gift" and Cruise doesn't want it but Tech does. Cruise then tells Tech that somebody reported to the media that Cruise played in an illegal basketball game for money, and he lost his scholarship. Tech asks him if he's going to accept Vaughn's offer and go to the NBA, but Cruise denies and says that he is going to community college and transfer to university to be a doctor. Tech tells him that he is also going to community college after finally passing his GED test. Cruise agrees to play on Tech's team in the next basketball game, then leaves and goes to Vanessa's house.

Cruise tells Vanessa that he lost his scholarship and that they won't be moving to Los Angeles. Vanessa is stunned when Cruise tells her that he is not going to the NBA either and will rather stay in Detroit and go to community college. Vanessa instantly says she's not interested in the relationship anymore, and openly admits that she has been playing Cruise the entire relationship. She reveals that she was actually pregnant by Jewelz and that the only reason she dated Cruise was because she thought he was about to move to California and become a big basketball star. Cruise drives home heartbroken and ends up getting into a motorcycle accident.

In his hospital bed, Cruise softly whispers to Tech how Vanessa lied to him. The next day, Tech deduces that it was Vanessa who told the media about Cruise playing in one of Vaughn's illegal basketball games and goes to confront her at the nail salon where she and Eboni work. Vanessa denies the accusation but Tech knows she is lying and leaves. Tech and Eboni then go to a wagering shop and Tech bets $10,000 that Enemy of the State will beat Platinum in the next game. During a meeting between Tech and his team, Vaughn arrives and tells Tech that he heard about the $10,000 bet. If the Platinum team scores over 11 points, even if Platinum loses the game, Tech loses the bet and Vaughn wins the $10,000. Tech brings up how Vaughn was the mastermind behind Cruise losing his scholarship. Tech realizes that even though Vaughn didn't directly say anything to the media, he was aware of Vanessa's gold-digging lifestyle and that's why he talked to Cruise about the NBA in front of her. Vaughn silently admits that Tech is right and he accepts the bet.

At the basketball game, Tech's friend Up (Lil JJ) takes Cruise's spot on the team and Tech wears Cruise's jersey. The final possession comes down to Enemy of the State leading the game 19–11. Up makes the final 2-pointer and wins the game for Enemy of the State 21–11. Since Platinum didn't score more than 11 points, Tech wins the $10,000 bet as well. After the game, Vaughn offers Tech a spot as one of his players under his management and how they can make so much money together because "great minds think alike". Tech corrects him and says that "great minds think for themselves", then uses the analogy of how Cruise wanted to get an education and be a doctor but everybody else wanted him to join the NBA. Tech declines Vaughn's offer and then walks out of the basketball arena.

=== Epilogue ===
Vaughn sells his nightclub, shuts down the basketball arena, and moves to Los Angeles and marries his girlfriend.

Jewelz breaks his ankle in a streetball game and opens up a strip-club. Jewelz learns he is also not the father of Vanessa's child.

Vanessa has 2 more kids and still works part-time at the nail salon.

Cruise gets out of the hospital with a clean bill of health. He graduates from community college, then moves to Atlanta to attend Morehouse School of Medicine.

Tech plays basketball for his community college team and gets the attention of some sports scouts. These scouts help Tech get a spot on the El Madrid team in the Euroleague. Tech and Eboni are still seeing each other, and she moves to New York as a professional make-up artist.

== Cast ==
- Anthony Mackie as Tech
- Wesley Jonathan as Noah Cruise
- Wayne Brady as Vaughn
- Kristen Wilson as Nikki
- Lil' JJ as Up (credited as both Lil' J.J. and Li'l JJ)
- Philip Champion as Jewelz (credited with two "l"s as Phillip)
- Eva Pigford as Vanessa
- Alecia Fears as Eboni

== Reception ==
=== Critical response ===
On the review aggregator website Rotten Tomatoes, 2% of 63 critics' reviews are positive, with an average rating of 3.2/10. The website's consensus reads: "This heartfelt but incompetent, cliche-ridden sports picture is the cinematic equivalent of an airball." It was ranked number 44 in a Rotten Tomatoes editorial on the 100 worst movies of all time. Metacritic, which uses a weighted average, assigned the film a score of 30 out of 100, based on 19 critics, indicating "generally unfavorable" reviews. Audiences polled by CinemaScore gave the film an average grade of "B" on an A+ to F scale.

The Seattle Times' Jeff Shannon saw the film's "blatantly formulaic" parts throughout the runtime with its "rudimentary filmmaking, predictable plot elements, amateur acting" and broad conclusion, but commended Whitmore for utilizing his limited resources to create a project that grows on you past the first five minutes, saying that "Crossover has a built-in audience that won't be disappointed, especially if you go in with low expectations." Gregory Kirschling from Entertainment Weekly gave the film a "C−" grade, saying "Crossover skimps on court-level pyrotechnics (we get a game in the beginning and, of course, a big game at the end, and that's about it) in favor of dry urban melodrama." Despite giving credit to the rapport between Mackie and Jonathan's characters and Brady's role as the antagonistic sports agent, Tom Meek of The Phoenix was critical of the movie being a "flimsy cut-out of Ron Shelton's White Men Can't Jump by way of Hoop Dreams" due in part to hackneyed plot devices, "low production values" and Whitmore's "stilted direction", resulting in a streetball tale being filled with "hip-hop flash and contrivance." Scott Tobias of The A.V. Club criticized Whitmore's "amateurish" production for constructing a faux Detroit locale that strands the cast with delivering awkward scenes and failing to say anything new about street basketball that White Men Can't Jump already told before, saying that "Crossover doesn't have the competence to make it exciting or the desire to explore what's really at stake for these players."

USA Today's Claudia Puig felt the lack of "gripping, adrenaline-fueled" streetball scenes was the movie's downfall, saying "Nothing feels very underground or edgy about this urban melodrama, which bogs down in a clichéd story and leaden dialogue." The Austin Chronicle's Marjorie Baumgarten found the film's characters and story elements "predictable and heavy-handed", and the basketball action lackluster to engage viewers, concluding that "Whitmore tries out all sorts of zappy camera edits, yet when it comes to filming a basketball game, he shoots mainly air balls. Crossover tries hard but never makes the leap." Nick Schager of Slant Magazine heavily lambasted Whitmore for taking the style over substance approach when ineptly directing both his basketball and dramatic scenes, and his script for telling a hypocritical moral lesson about "pro-education and anti-athletic glory", calling it "a pathetic imitation of an emotionally engaging, professionally made movie." Desson Thomson of The Washington Post said the film could've been "a truly terrible movie to savor for the ages", highlighting Whitmore's filmmaking style of "frenetically edited montages with de rigueur hip-hop" in the bookend court scenes, overly saccharine moments being accompanied by "lachrymose saxophone riffs", and the one-note cast delivering laughable dialogue but felt it maintained its position of "middle-of-the-road badness", concluding that "[I]t's simply too dull and meandering to merit impassioned disdain. It just sits there, warming the bench and only dreaming of the dubious big time. Even as a howler of a movie, it doesn't have game."

=== Box office ===
The film also did poorly at the box office, earning roughly US$3.7 million on opening weekend, grossing just over $7 million by the end of its short-lived 29 days in theaters – though its budget of only $5.8 million, plus associated marketing and theater expenses, may have minimized net losses.

== See also ==
- List of American films of 2006
- List of basketball films
