= 3x3 basketball in Puerto Rico =

Streetball variant of 3-on-3 basketball

In order to promote the popularity of the sport, FIBA decided to organize tournaments based on the streetball variant of 3-on-3 in 2010, mainly due to its predominance even in countries without basketball tradition, creating a division named FIBA 3x3. Team San Juan, based on the municipality of the same name, was the champion of the first edition of the FIBA 3x3 World Tour. The Puerto Rico men's national 3x3 team has won medals in the Pan American and Central American and Caribbean Games.

== National program ==
=== Summer Youth Olimpics ===
The first FIBA Americas workshop for the 3x3 initiative was held in San Juan, Puerto Rico, on August 13, 2012, counting with the participation of federations from Brasil, Argentina, Ecuador, Guatemala, Venezuela, Dominican Republic and the host. The first worldwide implementation of the format came at the 2010 Summer Youth Olympics, where the Federación de Baloncesto de Puerto Rico assembled a team that ran parallel to the junior national team but did not rely on its players, composed of Kristian Medina, Ónix Collazo, Ángel Torres and Abdiel Badillo.

Puerto Rico opened with a 33–15 victory over India. However, the team then lost a series of close games to European adversaries, the first against Greece by two points, the second to New Zealand by four points and the last one to eventual gold medallist, Serbia, by a single point. In the next round, Puerto Rico opened by defeating Egypt 29–16 and Turkey 30–28 to advance, before losing the final game to the Philippines. The first FIBA tournament was the 2011 FIBA 3x3 Youth World Championship, to which the team remained the same except for Kevin Ramiu replacing Badillo. The team lost in the opening to Estonia by a single point. In the following round, Puerto Rico defeated India. This was followed by a win over Slovenia. In his following appearance Puerto Rico outscored Sri Lanka. In the fifth round, the team defeated Ukraine, 14–9. In the following date, they were edged by Greece in a two-point loss. In the seventh round, the team lost to Tunisia. Puerto Rico recovered by defeating South Korea. The team closed the finals rounds with wins over Turkey and Spain and losses to Bulgaria and Latvia.

=== Junior Pan American Games ===
The team of Adrián Ocasio, Luis Rivera, Luis Cuascut and Leandro Allende won the 3x3 gold medal for Puerto Rico at the inaugural Junior Pan American Games.

== Club competition ==
=== FIBA 3x3 World Tour ===
The first participation of senior players was the 3x3 World Tour, where a team of BSN reserve players coached by Álex Rivera and formed by José "Hueso" López, Jonathan García and guard Andrés "Corky" Ortíz, Jr. and forward William Orozco, organized a team to represent the municipality of San Juan. The team's first participation was at the New York Master.

San Juan won its opening game over NY Bronx with scores of 21–7. To complete the round robin they defeated Team Dallas (21–17), Team Edmonton (16–12) and Team Orlando (21–15). San Juan won its quarterfinals draw over Team Minnesota with scores of 14–13. Their next opponent was Team Moscow, whom they defeated 17–15. In the finals, the team lost to Team Denver 17–19 on a last-second three-point basket, but classified for the 3x3 World Tour Finals. Held in Miami, the event began on September 21, 2012, and lasted three days, gathering the top-four teams from the New York, São Paulo, Vladivostok, Insatnbul and Madrid Masters. Their first draw in this stage was the wild card qualifier Team Miami, whom they defeated 16–8. In their next appearance, San Juan earned a 16–13 victory over Bucharest UPB. The second day of competition was suspended due to the weather conditions, the following morning San Juan participated in a matchup against Team Neuquén, winning with scores of 20–18. In the closer of the postponed round, the team faced Team Split, losing 13–17. To close the round robin, San Juan defeated Team Khavarovsk 21–9. Advancing to the quarterfinals, the team was placed in a rematch against Team Denver, winning by two points 20–18. In the semifinals, their opponent was Team Edmonton, who had entered the round undefeated in this branch of the event, but was defeated with scores of 19–17. The final was another rematch, this time against Team Split, which San Juan won by scores of 20–16 to become the first FIBA 3x3 World Tour champion.

Team San Juan returned intact to defend its championship in the 2013 3x3 World Tour, this time debuting in the San Juan Master. The team won the first stage by besting Team Miami (21–7), Team Toronto (14:13) and NY Queens (20:16). Two other local squads joined in this edition. The first was Team Pito Barber (Barceloneta, Puerto Rico) composed by Josean Serrano, Juan Ortega, Alexis Rosario and Ángel Acevedo. They won its first game over Team Montreal (22:20), but lost the second (19:21) to Team Philadelphia. Team Pito Barber advanced with a 15:12 win over Team Denver, despite only counting with one of its players in full health, with two being previously injured in the first game and the third in the second. Papito's Team was also based in San Juan, being distinguished by adopting the name of "Team Santurce" and featured Wilfredo Sánchez, Jorge Rodríguez, Jairas Morales and Joel Romero. This team lost NY Staten (9:21), Team San Cristobal (13:16) and Team Saskatoon (9:21), being eliminated from the tournament.
