= Aaron Owens =

American basketball player (born 1974)

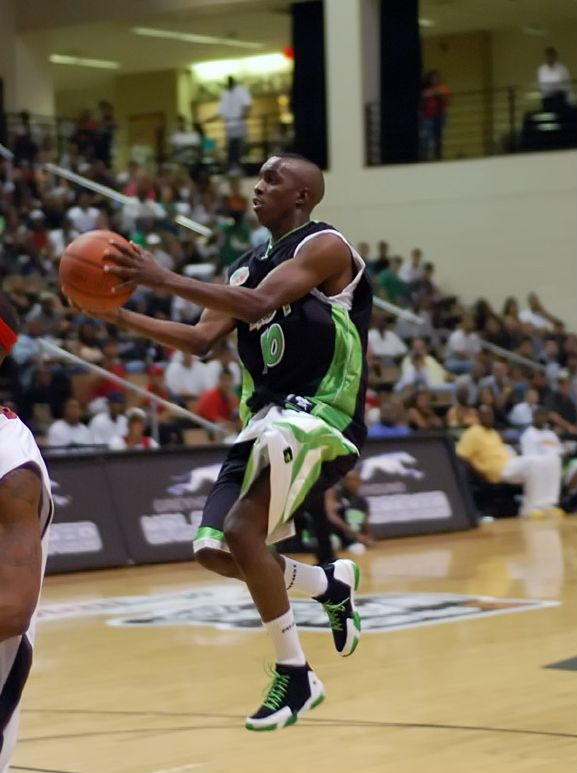
- Aaron "AO" Owens going up for a shot during the AND1 tournament in 2006

Personal information
- Nickname: AO
- Nationality: American
- Born: March 20, 1974 (age 52) Philadelphia, Pennsylvania
- Height: 6 ft 3 in (1.91 m)
- Weight: 185 lb (84 kg)

Sport
- Sport: Basketball
- Event: Streetball
- College team: Henderson State University (1998–99)
- Team: Fort Wayne Fury (1999); Dakota Wizards (1999–2000); Maccabi Karmiel (2000–2001); Mobile Revelers (2002–2003); AND1 Mixtape Tour (2001–2006); Ball4Real World Tour (2007–2008) BallUp Streetball (2009–)
- Turned pro: 1999

Aaron Owens (born March 20, 1974), better known by his nickname "AO", is an American streetball player from North Philadelphia.

In 2013, Owens participated in the Ball4Real World Tour. He was on the AND1 Mixtape Tour from its creation until 2007. Owens attended Simon Gratz High School. He attended Salem International University in West Virginia from 1992 to 1993 but did not play basketball for the school. He accepted a scholarship from Fort Hays State University in Hays, Kansas during the 1997–1998 academic year, where he was the starting point guard. At the end of the school year, Owens made the decision to transfer. He then played basketball at Henderson State University in Arkansas from 1998 to 1999, where he graduated in 1999 and was a Division II All-American.
