= Streetball =

Variation of basketball

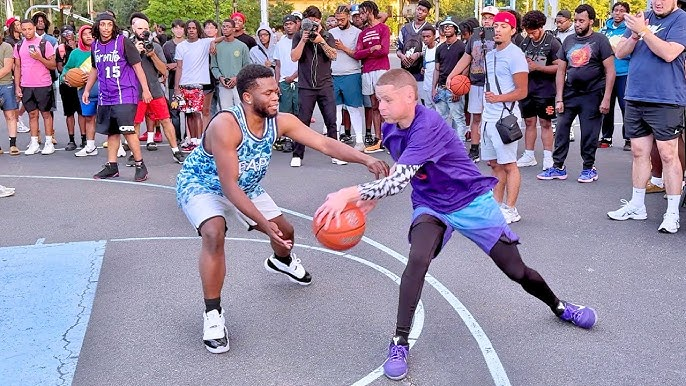
'The Professor' playing streetball in Brooklyn, NY.

Streetball (or street basketball) is a variation of pick-up basketball, typically played on outdoor courts, allowing players to publicly showcase their own individual skills. Streetball may also refer to other urban sports played on asphalt. Its form originates from the outdoor courts of New York City and Los Angeles, though its popularity has spread across the world due to the game's adaptability and accessibility. Streetball has also become connected to urban culture, where it functions as a social space, community activity, and form of expression tied to neighborhood identity. In recent decades, streetball has also appeared in popular media through films, television, digital platforms, and commercial entertainment.

Some places and cities in the United States have organized streetball programs, operated similarly to midnight basketball programs. Many cities also host their own weekend-long streetball tournaments, with Hoop-It-Up and the Houston Rockets' Blacktop Battle being two of the most popular. Holcombe Rucker had a big impact on streetball when he created a league in New York City, and it was later dedicated to him and named Rucker Park. Since the mid-2000s, streetball has seen an increase in media exposure through television shows such as ESPN's Street Basketball and City Slam, as well as traveling exhibitions such as the AND1 Mixtape Tour, YPA, and Ball4Real.

It is also popular in other countries, such as the Philippines. Many Filipino streets have their own basketball court. Tournaments are also organized, especially during the summer and holiday season. Divisions are divided into four brackets, Mosquito (ages 7 to 13), Midget (ages 14 to 17), Junior (ages 18 to 25), and Senior division (ages 26 and up). In France, Quai 54 takes place every summer. It is one of the biggest streetball tournaments in the world.

== Rules and features ==
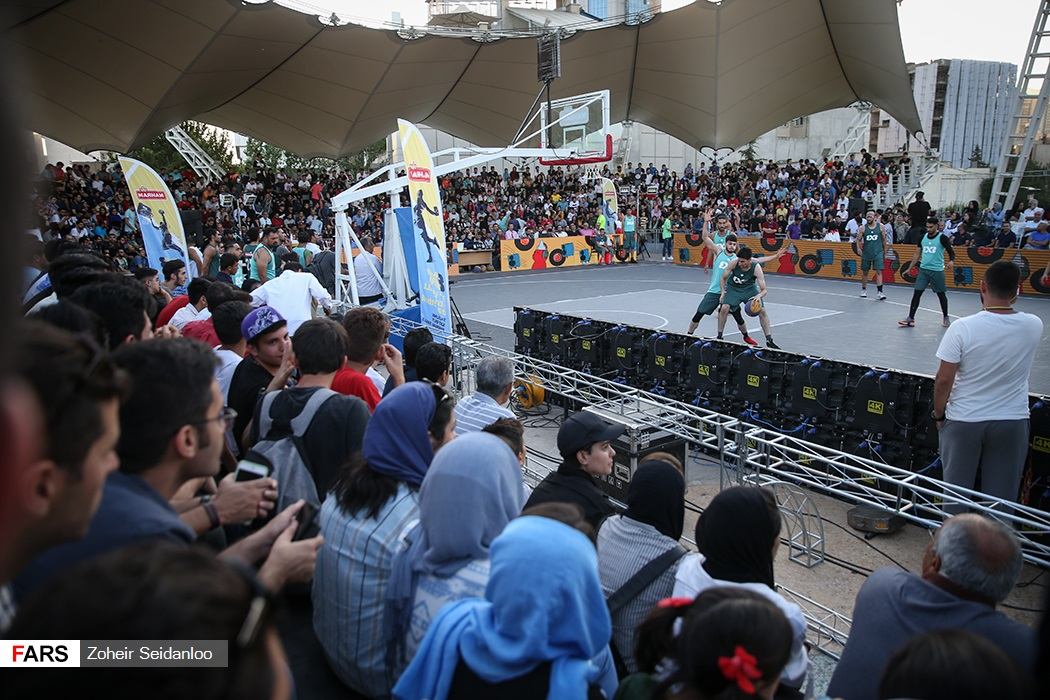
A streetball tournament in Tehran

Streetball rules vary widely from court to court. Games often do not have a referee. Instead, games typically use a "call your own foul" rule is in effect, and a player who believes he has been fouled, simply needs to call out "Foul!", and play will be stopped, with the ball awarded to the fouled player's team (free throws are not usually awarded in street ball), usually after a brief debate over the alleged foul.

Calling fouls is generally disfavored. The etiquette of what rightly constitutes a foul, as well as the permissible amount of protestation against such a call, are the products of individual groups, and of the seriousness of a particular game.

Another possible streetball feature is having an MC call the game. The MC is on the court during the game and is often very close to the players (but makes an effort to not interfere with the game) and uses a microphone to provide game commentary for the fans.

=== Half-court play ===
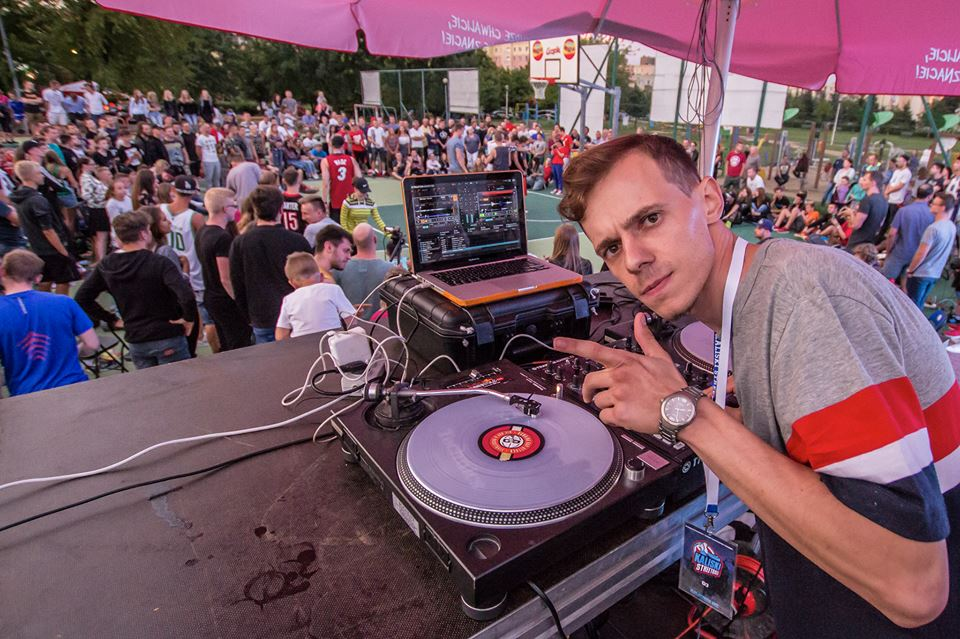
The Kaliski Streetball international 3x3 street basketball tournament in Kalisz, Poland (2018)

The majority of streetball games are played 3-on-3 on a half court. Special rules have been developed for half-court play:

- At the beginning of the game and after each made basket, play begins at the top of the key. A "checking" system is used to ensure that both teams are ready to begin play. This involves the offensive player saying "check" while throwing the ball to his defender. The defender then makes sure their team is ready and then throws the ball back to begin play.
- If the ball goes out of bounds during play, the ball can either be checked from out of bounds near where the ball went out or at the top of the key, depending on the rules established before the game.
- FIBA recently had to add the "check clock" rule into play in their streetball tournaments due to some players taking excruciatingly long amounts of time to check the ball, interrupting the flow of play. This "check clock" means that when the defending player has been checked the ball, he has to return it within 5 seconds.
- The "12-second shot clock" rule can be implemented as well to prevent longer possessions. (used in streetball tournaments)
- If the defending team gains possession of the ball, they must "clear" the ball past the three-point line before they can score a basket. This does not need to be at the top of the key and no checking is required.
- Sometimes in a half-court game, a "winner's ball" or "make it, take it" rule is used. This means that when a team scores, they get the ball back on offense. Potentially, the other team could end up never getting the ball on offense if the first team scores on every possession.

=== One-on-one play ===
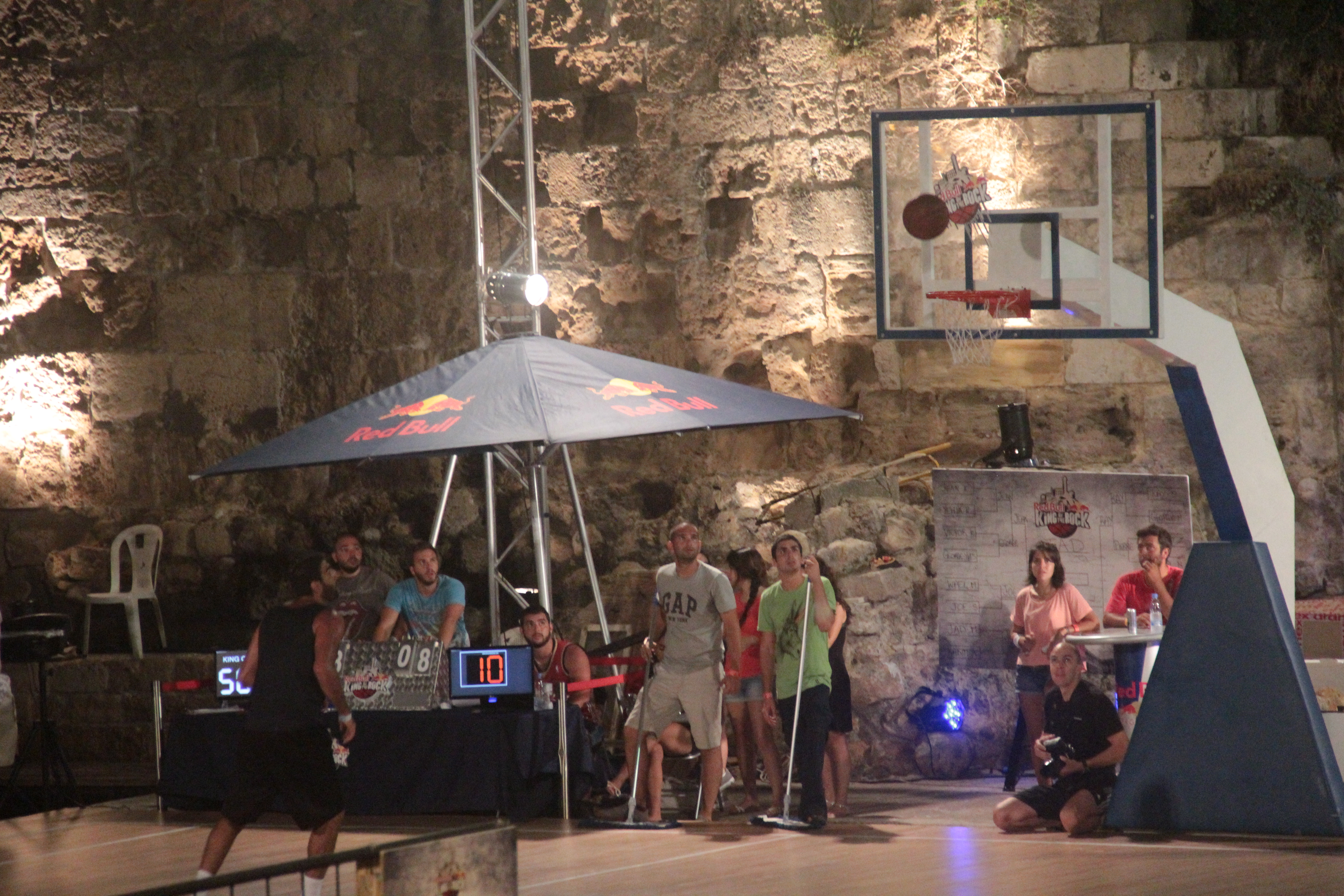
Red Bull King of the Rock Tournament on Alcatraz Island in San Francisco

Special rules can be instituted for one-on-one play:

- Often in a one-on-one game, a "winner's ball" or "make it, take it" rule is used. In this case, if a player scores, they will get play offense again and the other player may never get the chance to play offense.
- Sometimes the losing player of a one-on-one match is given a second chance for overtime. This either results with the match continuing or if the match is close enough the next person to go up by 2 points wins.
- A close game of one-on-one cannot end on a bank shot. If a bank shot happens on the last point of the game, there is a replay of possession. (refer as the no bank shot rule)
- One variation is the skunk rule, which states that if a player reaches a certain point without the other player scoring, the game is ends. The skunk rule limit can vary, but often ends a game at 7 to 0.
- A local dead end limit rule can be applied; for instance a game may be played to 7, win by 2, with a 9-point dead end, (refer to as 7 by 2's, 9 straight) which would mean scores of 7–3, 8–6, or 9–8 would all be final, while with scores of 7–6 or 8–7, play would continue.

== Streetball in popular media ==
Streetball is widely represented in U.S media, where it is oftentimes framed as a distinctive basketball subculture associated with racialized urban ghettos. The media portrayal of Streetball began with journalism and then expanded to movies, video games, advertising, and other promotions. Media portrayals oftentimes highlight iconic streetball venues, such as Rucker Park. In these portrayals, the depiction of streetball usually emphasizes creativity, competitiveness, and one-on-one battles. Scholars note that these portrayals connect to cultural narratives that link streetball to Black masculinity and the social dynamic of urban neighborhoods. The portrayals demonstrate how streetball's media image shapes public perceptions of urban communities. Scholars note that these representations of urban communities serve as cultural commentary on race masculinity and urban identity. Scholar John Bloom argues that American sports function as cultural texts that broader communal and social values, which explains how the perception of streetball carries meaning beyond the court.

=== Films and TV programs ===
- Above the Rim
- American History X
- City Slam, a television program broadcast on ESPN
- Crossover
- He Got Game
- Like Mike 2: Streetball
- Uncle Drew
- White Men Can't Jump
- Hustle

=== Animated series ===
- Harlem Beat (Rebound)
- The Basketeers (Baskup - Tony Parker)
- Barangay 143

=== Video games ===
- AND 1 Streetball, video game by Ubisoft (2006)
- FreeStyle Street Basketball, an online PC game by JC Entertainment
- NBA Ballers, video game by Midway (2004-2007)
  - sequels to NBA Ballers: NBA Ballers: Rebound, NBA Ballers: Phenom, and NBA Ballers: Chosen One
- NBA Street, video game series by EA Sports (2001-2007)
- Street Hoops, video game by Activision (2002)
- Street Slam, video game by Data East (1994)
- NBA Playgrounds, video game by Saber Interactive (2017)
- NBA 2K Playgrounds 2, video game by Saber Interactive and published by 2K (2018)

== Notable Streetballers ==
- Rafer "Skip to my Lou" Alston
- Kenny Brunner aka Bad Santa
- Sylvester "Sy" Blye
- Emmanuel "Hard Work" Bibb
- Grayson "The Professor" Boucher
- Cardell "Ballaholic" Butler
- Kevin "Bizzness" Butler
- Philip Champion aka Hot Sauce/Sizzle
- Lloyd "Swee' Pea" Daniels
- Jamar "The Pharmacist" Davis
- Waliyy "Main Event" Dixon
- Brandon "The Assassin" Durham
- Taurian "Mr. 720" Fontenette
- Bobbito García
- Joe Hammond (basketball)
- Connie "The Hawk" Hawkins
- Joey "King Handles" Haywood
- Deshun "Father Time" Jackson
- Jumpin Jackie Jackson
- Troy "Escalade" Jackson
- Shamel Jones
- Richard "Pee Wee" Kirkland
- Raymond Lewis
- Earl "The Goat" Manigault
- Demetrius "Hook" Mitchell
- Malloy Nesmith Sr.
- Aaron "AO" Owens
- Darren "Primal Fear" Phillip
- Kareem "The Best Kept Secret" Reid
- Jack "Black Jack" Ryan
- William Sanders (basketball)
- Adam Sandler, actor and comedian
- Ed "Booger" Smith
- John "The Franchise" Strickland
- Adrian Walton
- James Pookie Wilson
- Corey "Homicide" Williams
- Larry "Bone Collector" Williams
- James Speedy Williams

=== Similar variations of other sports in the US ===
- Street football (American football)
- Street soccer
