= NBA Ballers: Rebound =

2006 video game

- European box art
- Developer: Backbone Entertainment
- Publisher: Midway Games
- Series: NBA Ballers
- Platform: PlayStation Portable
- Release: NA: May 9, 2006; AU: September 28, 2006; EU: September 29, 2006
- Genre: Sports (basketball)
- Modes: Single-player, Multiplayer

NBA Ballers: Rebound is a PlayStation Portable video game from Midway Games, part of the NBA Ballers series. In this game, players play one on one matches against other ballers to gain points which they can use to buy cars, bling, clothes etc. The games are best of three rounds and each round is to eleven points.

== Single-player ==
=== Rags To Riches ===
Rags To Riches is a single player mode where players create a baller and try to play their way up through the ranks from the fellow street ballers to the NBA greats. This is the main mode of the game. The Rags To Riches tournaments consist of:

=== Inside Stuff ===
Inside Stuff is a place where players can acquire NBA stars, cars, cribs, special in game movies, and codes or phrase-ology, with points that players get from any single player mode in the game. All the items they "buy" can be accessed every time they load their profile. It is somewhat of a trophy case for extreme NBA Baller: Rebound players.

== Reception ==
Reception

Aggregate score
Aggregator	Score
Metacritic	69/100

Review scores
Publication	Score
Game Informer	8/10
GameSpot	7.5/10
GameSpy	3/5
GamesTM	7/10
GameTrailers	7.9/10
IGN	7.4/10
PlayStation Official Magazine – UK	7/10
Official U.S. PlayStation Magazine	2.5/5
PlayStation: The Official Magazine	6.5/10
PSM3	78%

The game received "average" reviews according to the review aggregation website Metacritic.
