= Waliyy Dixon =

American basketball player (born 1974)

Personal information
- Nickname: Main Event
- Nationality: American
- Born: February 27, 1974 (age 52) Linden, New Jersey, United States
- Height: 6 ft 4 in (1.93 m)
- Weight: 225 lb (102 kg)

Sport
- Sport: Basketball
- Event: Streetball
- College team: Rutgers University (1993–94); Benedict College
- Team: Long Island Surf (USBL); Atlantic City Seagulls (USBL); AND1 Mixtape Tour (2001–06); Ball4Real (2007–08)
- Turned pro: 1995
- Retired: 2006
- Now coaching: S.K.Y. Streetball Syndicate (2009–)

Waliyy Dixon (born February 27, 1974), better known by his streetball nickname "Main Event", is an American professional basketball player. He was born and raised in Linden, New Jersey.

== Early life ==
Dixon spent his youth honing his streetball skills at his favorite hometown court, 4th Ward Park. He attended Linden High School and was chosen by Street & Smith as an All-American after his senior season in 1991–92. Dixon graduated as its all-time leading scorer (1,760 points) and officially concluded his prep career by winning the Reebok National Slam Dunk Contest. He chose to stay in New Jersey to play college basketball and attended Rutgers University. Despite a lot of success at the high school level, Dixon's career as a Scarlet Knight was not noteworthy. He played for just two seasons (1992–94) and averaged 9.6 points in 26 games played.

== Professional career ==
=== AND1 ===
In 1994, a videotape of the Entertainer's Basketball Classic at Harlem's Rucker Park was found by two of AND1 Basketball's partners, Jay Coen Gilbert and Seth Berger. The tape, which wound up being the AND1 Mix Tape Volume One, gave national exposure to streetball. It featured some of the jaw-dropping moves of a then little-known player named Waliyy Dixon. Then, in the summer of 1999, before the AND1 Mixtape Tour ever existed, Dixon met with several AND1 representatives. After discussing the streetball scene he helped bring other streetballers to the AND1 family. He then worked with AND1 to host the original AND1 Mix Tape game later that summer at his home court in Linden. More than 2,000 people showed up to St. Mark's Park to watch what turned into footage for Mix Tape Vol. 2. "Main" and the other streetballers were then signed to endorsement deals that fall. Dixon would play for the AND1 Mix Tape Tour from 2001 through 2006.

Nickname origin
During high school Dixon was known locally via the Newark Star Ledger as "The Coming Attraction" based on his skills and aerial flair. At Rucker Park in the early 1990s, Dixon completed a 360 degree dunk that stunned the crowd. It earned him the name "The Main Event" as he began to attract a huge following to Rucker games.

=== Other leagues ===
Waliyy Dixon played professionally in the United States Basketball League (USBL) for the Atlantic City Seagulls and Long Island Surf. He also spent some time in training camp with the New Jersey Nets before the 2004 and 2005 NBA seasons.

== Life after AND1 ==
=== Ball4Real ===
In his post-AND1 Mix Tape Tour life, Dixon has embarked on several basketball-related projects. Ball4Real, a streetball tour similar in nature to AND1, was co-created by Main Event and a handful of other former AND1 players. It started in 2007, but after less than a year and a half it disbanded due to lack of revenue and media support.

=== S.K.Y. Streetball Syndicate ===
S.K.Y., an acronym for Serving Knowledge to Youth, is the name for a new clothing organization, Streetball Syndicate. It focuses on special basketball tours and community outreach programs. Dixon is a co-founder of the organization with other streetball players, some of whom used to also tour for AND1. He currently serves as the Vice President of Player Development and works out of his hometown of Linden, New Jersey.
