= Ball4Real =

Traveling basketball exhibition and competition

official Logo

Ball4Real was the name of a traveling basketball exhibition and competition which made its debut in June 2007. A group of well-known streetball players traveled from city to city to challenge teams composed of local talent. Games tended to be characterized by complicated dribbling, ballhandling, and passing, acrobatic slam dunks, and a looser interpretation of rules.

== Origin and players ==
Ball4Real was created by former members of the AND1 streetball team as well as Lisa Fusco, the former general manager of the AND1 Mixtape Tour and present Ball4Real CEO. The players and Fusco were all part owners of the tour. The 2007 team consisted of the players who defected from AND1 along with some new players. The group toured through 2007 in arenas, but attendance was low, and the group disbanded in February 2008, with many of its players joining the Ball4LifeTour. On July 14, 2008 Demetrius "Hook" Mitchell signed a contract with the Mountain Dew sponsoring agency.

== See also ==
- AND1 Mixtape Tour
- Streetball
