= AND1 Live Tour =

US traveling basketball competition and exhibition

The AND1 Live Tour, formerly known as the AND1 Mixtape Tour, was a traveling basketball competition and exhibition that existed from 1998 to 2008. It was presented by B-Ball and Company and the basketball apparel manufacturer AND1. A group of streetball players, along with Emcee Rell and B-Ball and Company CEO Linda Hill, travelled from town to town and challenge teams composed of local talent. Games tended to be characterized by isolation one-on-one ball handling moves and acrobatic slam dunks and alley-oops.

The tour was televised in half-hour "Streetball" segments on ESPN2, and were compiled into highlight reels, offered under the mark AND1 Mixtape, which were sold on DVD. AND1 has released 10 volumes. The first mixtape was AND1 Mixtape Volume 1 (1998) and the most recent is AND1 Mixtape X (2008). The AND1 team has toured the world, meeting success against most international teams and scoring wins over adversaries from places as diverse as Chile and Angola, remaining undefeated outside the continental United States until they lost to the debuting Puerto Rico Streetballers in 2012.

== Controversy ==
AND1's calling card and large reason for success are the flashy moves that rely on a more lenient set of rules than in regulation basketball. This has led to comparisons with the Harlem Globetrotters and has caused some journalists to criticize the tour. Supporters of the tour have responded by backing up AND1's credibility and the players' legitimate skill. The AND1 players maintain that they are serious basketball players who play against the seven best local players from each city. Many of the current and former AND1 Mixtape Tour players have played in college and in professional organizations such as the CBL, ABA, NBDL, NBA or overseas.

== AND1 Live Streetballers ==
Official MC of the Tour: Duke Tango

- Rafer Alston a.k.a. Skip to my Lou, from Queens, New York.
- Grayson Boucher a.k.a. The Professor from Keizer, Oregon
- Philip Champion a.k.a. Hot Sauce from Atlanta, Georgia
- Waliyy Dixon a.k.a. Main Event from Linden, New Jersey
- Taurian Fontenette a.k.a. Air Up There from Hitchcock, Texas
- Troy Jackson a.k.a. Escalade from Queens, New York(deceased). The Younger Brother of Former NBA Player/Broadcaster Mark Jackson
- Aaron Owens a.k.a. AO from Philadelphia, Pennsylvania
- Larry Williams a.k.a. The Bone Collector from Tyler, Texas
- John Humphrey a.k.a. Helicopter from Morehead City, North Carolina
- Dennis Chism a.k.a. Spyda from Atlanta, Georgia
- Marvin Collins a.k.a. Highrizer from Atlanta, Georgia
- Guy Dupuy a.k.a. Easy J from Nice, France
- Tyrone Evans a.k.a. Alimoe / The Black Widow from Harlem (deceased, diabetes)
- David Gabriel a.k.a. Big Dave from Port Saint Lucie, Florida
- Tim Gittens a.k.a. Headache from New York City
- Antony Heyward Jr. a.k.a. 1/2 Man 1/2 Amazing from Brooklyn, New York
- Jerome Holman a.k.a. Circus from Brooklyn, New York
- Hugh Jones a.k.a. Baby Shack from Washington, D.C.
- Robin Kennedy Jr. a.k.a. Sik Wit It from Pasadena, California
- Brandon LaCue a.k.a. Werm from Ft. Lauderdale, Florida
- Robert Martin a.k.a. 50 from Atlanta, Georgia. Cousin of NBA player Kenyon Martin
- Paul Otim a.k.a. Polo from Atlanta, Georgia
- Andre Poole a.k.a. Silk from Baltimore
- Shane Woney a.k.a. The Dribbling Machine from Bronx, New York

== AND1 Mixtape Volumes ==
- AND1 Mixtape Vol. 1 (1998) – The "Skip Mixtape", mainly focused on Rafer Alston.
- AND1 Mixtape Vol. 2 (1999) – All games on this tape were filmed in New York City and Linden, New Jersey.
- AND1 Mixtape Vol. 3 (2000) – This tape was given to people who bought a pair of AND1 shoes.
- AND1 Mixtape Vol. 4 (2001) – Volume 4 was the first tape documenting the AND1 Mixtape Tour, which visited Los Angeles, Chicago, Washington D.C., and New York City.
- AND1 Mixtape Vol. 5 (2002) – Volume 5 was the return of Alston, after he had been playing Division I basketball at Fresno State University for three years.
- AND1 Mixtape Vol. 6 (2003) – Volume 6 toured Los Angeles, Chicago, Philadelphia, and New York City.
- AND1 Mixtape Vol. 7 (2004) – Every game in this volume was played in NBA arenas, and Grayson Boucher was discovered in the Open Run in Portland, Oregon Open Run. The tape also featured a brief appearance from retired basketball player Shaquille O'Neal.
- AND1 Mixtape Vol. 8: Back on the Block (2005) – Back on the Block featured a lot of "Crash the Court" footage, in which the AND1 team plays against local teams in public streetball locations.
- AND1 Mixtape Vol. 9: Area Codes (2006) – This volume shows the hometown and home court of every member of the AND1 team, including Philadelphia with Aaron Owens and Los Angeles with Kenny Brunner.
- AND1 Mixtape X: The United Streets of America (2008) – AND1 Mixtape X marked a decade of AND1, with footage from the United Streets Of America tour, which featured former Boston Celtics Player Carlos Arroyo.

Additional AND1 Mixtape Volumes

- AND1 Ball Access: The Mixtape Tour (2002) – A documentary that highlights the 2002 And1 Mix Tape Tour. Get on the bus for a behind the scenes look at the action on and off the court as it rolls through Boston, New Orleans, Atlanta, New York, Louisville and the rest of the summer's Mix Tape Tour cities. It's an all access pass into life on the Tour as the Players show how their creativity, flair and attitude isn't limited to what they can do on the court.
- AND1 Ball Access: Global Invasion (2004) – Everything from the courts to the culture in Paris, Barcelona, London, Milan, and Frankfurt. This was the first And 1 Mix Tape tour overseas adventure.
- AND1 Mixtape Tour: Asia Pacific (2006) – The '2004 AND 1 Mixtape World Tour' that ended with a comprehensive international visit of the Far East and Australasia in November. A compilation footage of the journey from Tokyo to Sydney. Includes previously unreleased tracks from Paul Wall, Mike Jones, Sam Scarfo, Clipse, Dipset featuring JR Writer, and Kanecc.
