= AND1 =

American sportswear and footwear company

- Type: Subsidiary
- Industry: Sports; Textile
- Founded: August 13, 1993 (33 years ago)
- Founders: Seth Berger; Jay Coen Gilbert; Tom Austin
- Headquarters: United States
- Products: Athletic shoes, clothing, accessories
- Parent: Galaxy Universal (2021–present)
- Website: and1.com

AND1 is an American footwear and clothing company specializing in basketball shoes, clothing, and sporting goods. AND1 was founded on August 13, 1993. The company focuses strictly on basketball and is a subsidiary of Galaxy Universal.

The company sponsors NBA athletes, as well as numerous high school and AAU teams in the United States.

== History ==
=== Early years ===
In 1993, AND1 began as a graduate school project partnership of Jay Coen Gilbert, Seth Berger, and Tom Austin while they were graduate students at the University of Pennsylvania's Wharton School. The company name is derived from a phrase used by basketball broadcasters to denote a free throw awarded to a player against whom a foul has been committed while scoring a goal.

The brand started by selling T-shirts out of the back of a car. Early advertising strategies included other basketball slogans and trash talk, such as "Pass. Save Yourself The Embarrassment". They targeted the niche market of street basketball players and avoided branching out to other markets. Foot Locker began to sell the shirts, and within the second year of launching, the business reached 1,500 stores across America. The company's first big endorsee was Larry Johnson, who briefly wore their shirts.

In 1996, NBA star Stephon Marbury became the first spokesman for AND1. That year, the company released its first basketball sneakers. That same year, AND1 signed Raef LaFrentz and Larry Hughes. From 1997 to 1998, AND1 quadrupled its market share.

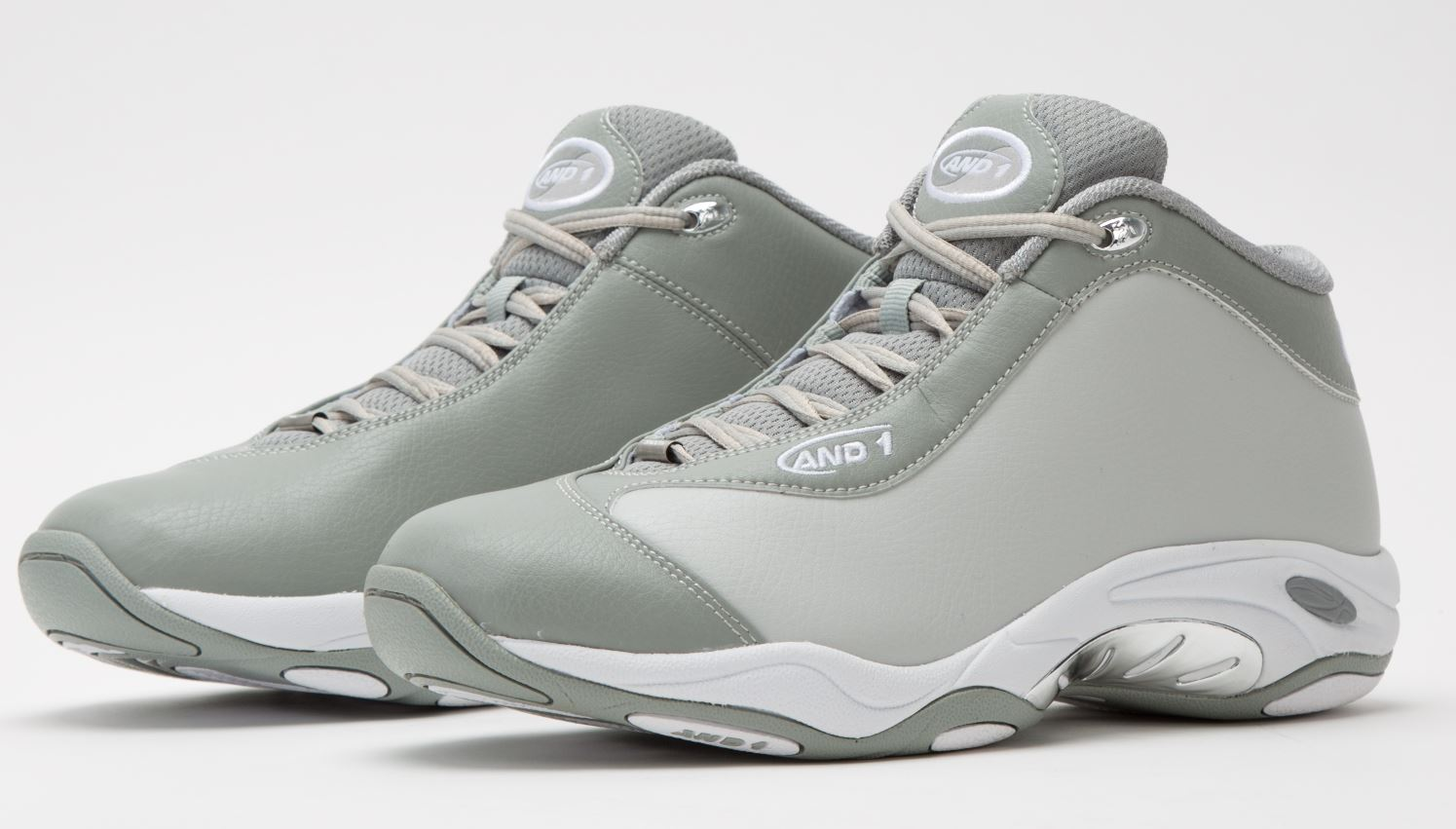
A pair of AND1 basketball shoes

=== The Skip Tape and success ===
In 1994, a videotape containing streetball stunts was delivered to AND1 by Marquise Kelly, coach of the Benjamin Cardozo High School team in Queens, New York. The tape contained low-quality video, poor resolution, and nearly indecipherable audio featuring a streetballer named Rafer Alston. This tape sat on a shelf until 1998, when it was edited and used at events. At the time, Alston was a student at Fresno State who had entered the 1998 NBA draft. The videotape would soon be known as the "Skip tape", referring to Alston's streetball nickname "Skip to my Lou". Alston later signed on with AND1.

In 1999 at Haverford College in Philadelphia, AND1 shot its first series of commercials and print ads incorporating NBA players Darrell Armstrong, Rex Chapman, Ab Osondu, Raef LaFrentz, Toby Bailey, and Miles Simon. The company signed Latrell Sprewell in 1999. His shoe, the AND1 Spree, was released in 2002. When the traditional marketing campaign proved unsuccessful, a strategy was formed to use the Skip tape. It was edited and reprinted into 50,000 copies, and over the next eight weeks, distributed across basketball camps, clinics, and record labels. The tape would become the first "Mixtape", and quickly made Alston into a celebrity.

When AND1 became a product partner with FootAction, this strategy evolved into a national program. Starting in the summer of 1999, a free AND1 Mixtape was given with any purchase. Approximately 200,000 tapes were distributed in the span of three weeks. It proved to be so successful that the company put together a team of streetball legends to serve as a traveling team and filmed new mixtapes. By the end of the year, the Philadelphia-based company had more than 70 employees.

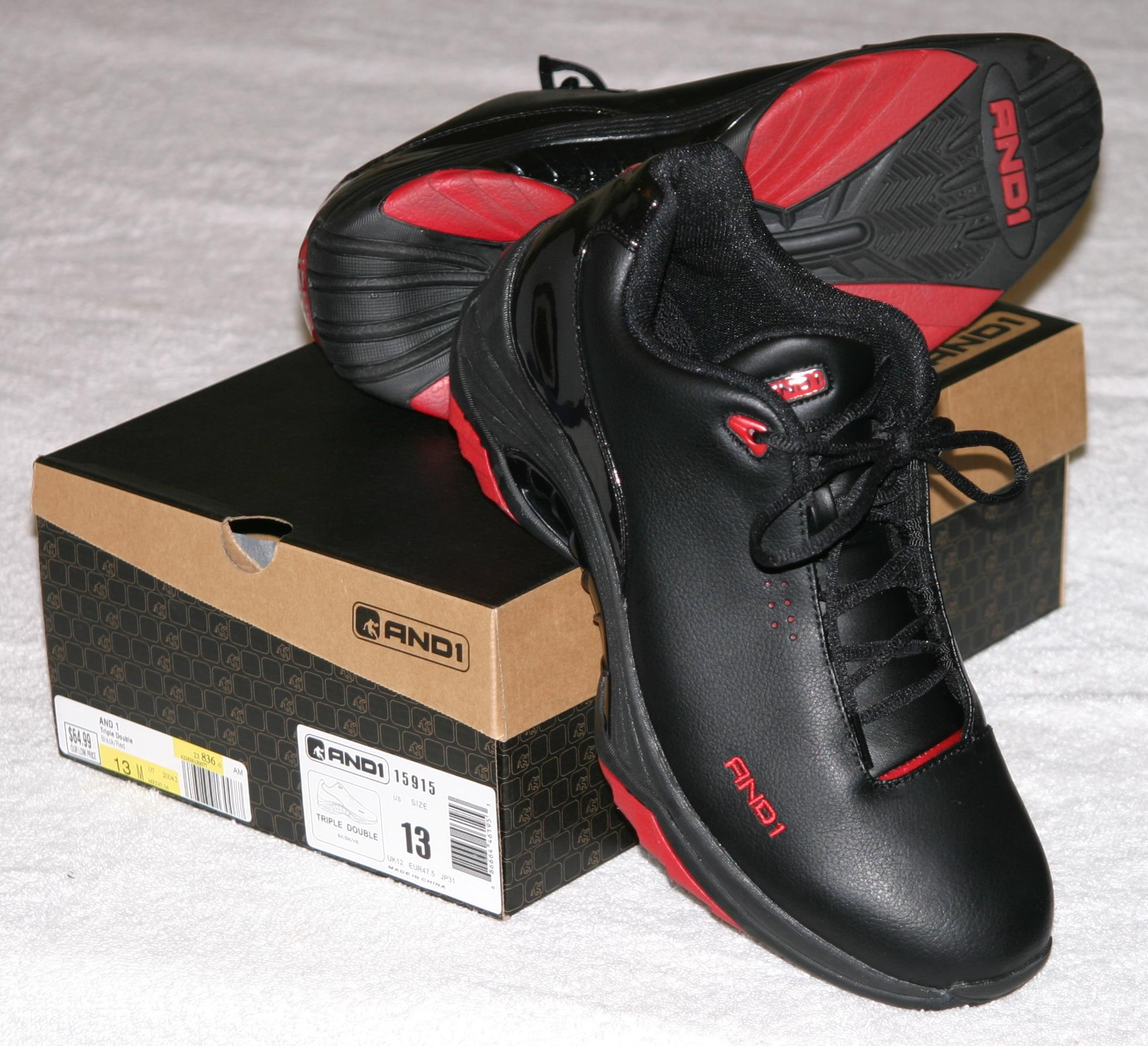
AND1 basketball shoes

AND1 gained fame when Vince Carter won the 2000 Slam Dunk Contest while wearing its Tai Chi shoes. He was then featured on the cover of the April 2000 issue of Slam wearing another pair. The company went on to sell more than a million shoes. By the 2001 season, AND1 was second only to Nike in market share and had $285 million in revenue. The company also signed Kevin Garnett and Jamal Crawford.

In 2002, the AND1 summer tours were expanded into the Mixtape Tour. "Open runs" were also introduced, where local street ballers were given a chance to go up against AND1's team. The best from that group would join the summer tour and receive endorsement deals from AND1. Grayson Boucher, aka "The Professor," was the first to win a spot on the team. Founder Tom Austin left the company in 2003. Another iconic moment for the brand came in 2004, when Chauncey Billups won the NBA Finals MVP while wearing the AND1 Rise sneaker.

=== Later years ===
By 2005, AND1 had 165 employees, $180 million in annual revenue, and sold its products in 125 countries. That May, it was announced that AND1 had been acquired by American Sporting Goods, which also owned brands like Avia, Ryka, Nevados, Yukon, Turntec, NSS, and Apex. Berger and Gilbert left soon after the sale.

In February 2011, ASG was purchased by Brown Shoe Company. By this time, Avia, Ryka, and AND1 made up 80% of the group's sales. Brown quickly divested AND1, selling the brand to the newly-formed Galaxy Brands in August 2011. In November 2012, AND1 signed then-Pacer Lance Stephenson to an endorsement deal. The company also signed 2013 rookies Isaiah Canaan and Jamaal Franklin.

In celebration of their 20-year anniversary, the brand hosted the AND1 Labor Day Summer Remix, a $100,000 winner-take-all basketball tournament in August 2013. The tournament took place in Temple University in Philadelphia, and also included a $10,000 dunk contest. Galaxy was acquired by Sequential Brands Group in June 2014.

In February 2015, AND1 signed a lease to operate a retail store at 172 Flatbush Ave in Brooklyn, directly across the street from the Barclays Center. This is the company's first street retail location.

Paying homage to Brooklyn streetball culture, AND1 partnered with SLAM magazine to host numerous events surrounding the 2015 NBA All-Star Game, played at the Barclays Center in downtown Brooklyn. Various charity events with two of New York's greatest streetball legends Lance Stephenson and Rafer "Skip to My Lou" Alston were followed by the launch of an exclusive pop-up retail lounge on Flatbush Avenue across from Barclays Center.

In July 2016, AND1 signed Brooklyn Nets guard Sean Kilpatrick. Over one hundred AND1 High School and AAU teams play across America in various tournaments and leagues, and an AND1 circuit in the making. In 2017, the brand introduced its own youth basketball circuit under the Dominate the Game name.

=== Brand revival ===
Looking to re-establish itself in the market, AND1 announced in 2018 that Kevin Garnett would serve Creative Director and Global Ambassador. It also named Jevon Carter and Thomas Beauchamp as ambassadors. In 2019, AND1 signed Toronto Raptors point guard Fred VanVleet to a major sponsorship deal and helped introduce the company's Action 2.0 shoe. Montrezl Harrell also briefly signed on before the deal fell through, though he continued to wear AND1 shoes. In 2021, the company signed VanVleet's teammate Norman Powell.

On August 31, 2021, Sequential Brands, AND1's parent, filed for Chapter 11 bankruptcy protection. In September 2021, AND1 was acquired by Galaxy Universal. In 2022, AND1 was featured in the Netflix documentary Untold: The Rise and Fall of And1 from director Kevin Wilson Jr. For its 30th anniversary in 2023, AND1 reintroduced its open run events in order to foster a new generation of streetball. In 2024, the company released a short documentary on the career of Ben Wallace. It also introduced Alexis Morris as its first female ambassador.

== AND1 Mixtape Tour ==
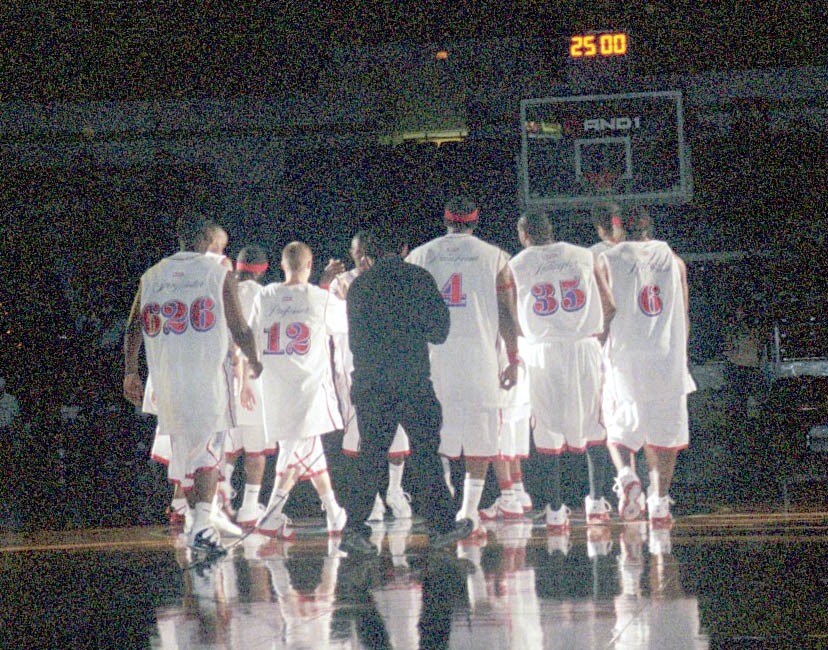
The AND1 team

AND1's summer tours began in 1999. The original group included Half Man Half Amazing, Shane the Dribble Machine, Main Event, Aircraft, Future, and Headache. In 2002, the tour was expanded into the AND1 Mixtape Tour, featuring streetball players of fame. Other standouts were Skip to My Lou, The Professor, Hot Sauce, Spyda, 50, and AO. From 2002 to 2008, the tours were televised live on ESPN under the name “Streetball” and competed with ESPN's SportsCenter for the highest ratings. The summer tours began in the United States but soon branched into more than 30 countries, with their products promoted in 130 countries and territories. Footage from ESPN was edited into highlight reels and sold as AND1 Mixtapes on DVD. In all, there were 10 volumes. The last, AND1 Mixtape X, was released in 2008.

Following the sale of AND1 in the mid-2000s, management of the Mixtape Tour changed, and many of the players ultimately left. However, the tour continued to visit 40 cities a year and 60 countries in a four-year span. After a short hiatus, the AND1 Live Streetball Tour started in 2010. In its inaugural year, the AND1 team went to Panama, Sint Maarten, Suriname, Guyana, and Trinidad and Tobago. In 2011 and, they visited Iraq, South Africa, Mozambique, Chile, Tanzania, Kenya, Uganda, Rwanda, and Botswana, and Saudi Arabia. The tour continued in 2012 and returned to Africa, adding Zimbabwe, Ethiopia, and Burundi to the tour. By 2013, Helicopter was the only remaining holdover from the Mixtape Tour days, and Werm and Guy "Frequent Flyer" Dupree were considered the new faces of AND1.

== Video games ==
In 2001, EA Sports released NBA Street for PlayStation 2 and GameCube. It featured AND1 apparel and footwear, but was licensed from the NBA. In 2002, Activision released the first AND1 video game, Street Hoops, featuring AND1 players.

The brand partnered with Ubisoft to release AND 1 Streetball in 2006 for PlayStation 2 and Xbox. A mobile version was also released by Gameloft. The game featured a story mode mirroring AND1's Streetball series on ESPN, where players were able to create their own basketball player and enter the AND 1 Mix Tape Tour in order to get a contract with the AND 1 team. Players were able to create their own stylized trick moves and pull them off with a two-analog stick system called "I BALL".

Title	Publisher	Developer	Platform	Release date
Street Hoops	Activision	Black Ops Entertainment	PlayStation 2, Xbox, GameCube	August 12, 2002
AND 1 Streetball	Ubisoft	Black Ops Entertainment	PlayStation 2, Xbox	June 6, 2006
