= Philip Champion =

American basketball player

Personal information
- Nickname: Hot Sauce
- Born: June 13, 1976 (age 50) Fort Campbell, Kentucky, U.S.

Sport
- Sport: Streetball
- Team: Imperial Valley College (1999); AND1 Mixtape Tour (2000–04, 06–08); College Park Spyders (2009–2012); Court Kingz (2012–)
- Turned pro: 2000
- Coached by: Bippy a.k.a Lava Sauce

Philip Champion (born June 13, 1976), also known as Hot Sauce, is an American former professional basketball player who has played on the Streetball AND1 Mixtape Tour from its creation in 2000. He was born in Fort Campbell, Kentucky, and raised in Jacksonville, Florida.

In 2006, he made his film debut as a role as Jewelz in the movie Crossover alongside Anthony Mackie, Wesley Jonathan, and Wayne Brady. In 2018, the Atlanta Hawks offered a promotion in which fans had the opportunity to guard Champion one-on-one for 24 seconds to win prizes.

== Professional career ==
=== College Park Spyders (2009–2012) ===
In January 2009, it was announced that Champion had signed with the College Park Spyders of the present American Basketball Association.
