= Deshun Jackson =

American streetball player

Deshun Jackson, a.k.a. "Father Time", is an American streetball player from Bakersfield, California who has appeared on two ESPN television shows. He was featured on season 2 of the AND1 Mixtape Tour television show on ESPN, and later on the show ESPN City Slam. Jackson is 6-foot 1-inch tall and plays shooting guard. He is known for his perimeter shooting skills. In 2005, Jackson finished 2nd in the City Slam 3-Point Shooting Championships, losing in a close battle to "Black Jack" Ryan. In 2009, Jackson participated in the SpikeTV show Pros vs Joes, where Jackson and 2 other "Joes" faced off against retired NBA players Ron Harper, Eddie Jones, and Shawn Kemp in a series of basketball related challenges. In the final 3-on-3 contest, Jackson's team was able to defeat the former NBA players in overtime. Jackson attended West High School in Bakersfield.
