= Big West Conference Men's Basketball Player of the Year =

Annual basketball award

- Awarded for: The most outstanding basketball player in the Big West Conference
- Country: United States

History
- First award: 1970
- Most recent: Josiah Davis, Cal State Northridge

The Big West Conference Men's Basketball Player of the Year is an annual award given to the Big West Conference's most outstanding player. The conference was formed in 1969 and known as the Pacific Coast Athletic Association until 1988. The award was first given following the 1969–70 season. No player has won the award three times, but there have been eight two-time players of the year. Larry Johnson of UNLV was also the national player of the year in 1990–91, the same season of his second consecutive Big West Player of the Year accolade.

Long Beach State has had the most all-time winners with 13. There have been three ties in the award's history, most recently in 2007–08. Among present Big West members, six schools have had no winners. Two have been members for most or all of the 21st century: Cal Poly since 1996 and UC Riverside since 2001. A third such program, Cal State Bakersfield, joined in 2020. The other three will play their first Big West seasons in 2026–27 — California Baptist, Sacramento State, and Utah Valley.

== Key ==
†	Co-Players of the Year
*	Awarded a national player of the year award that same season: Helms Foundation College Basketball Player of the Year (1904–05 to 1978–79); UPI College Basketball Player of the Year (1954–55 to 1995–96); Oscar Robertson Trophy (1958–59 to present); Naismith College Player of the Year (1968–69 to present); John R. Wooden Award (1976–77 to present)
Player (X)	Denotes the number of times the player has been awarded the Big West Player of the Year award at that point

== Winners ==
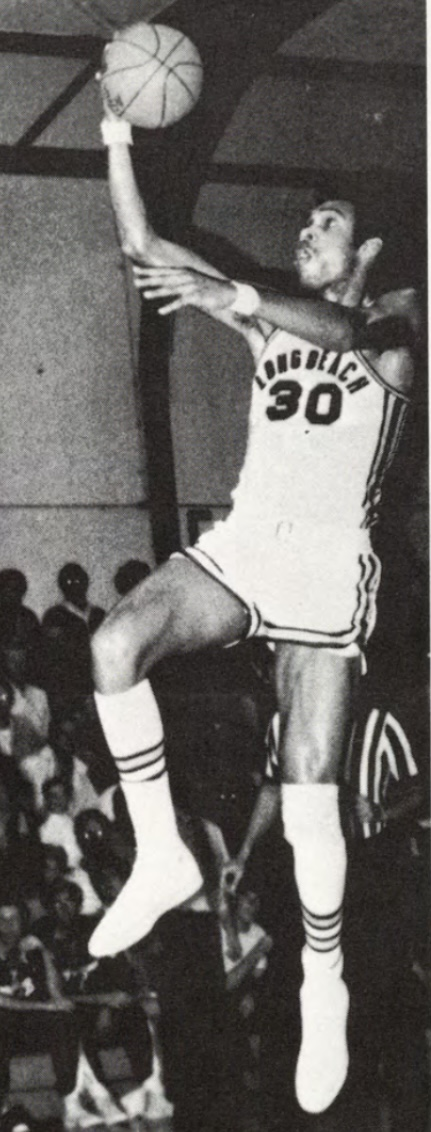
George Trapp, Long Beach State, 1970 and 1971

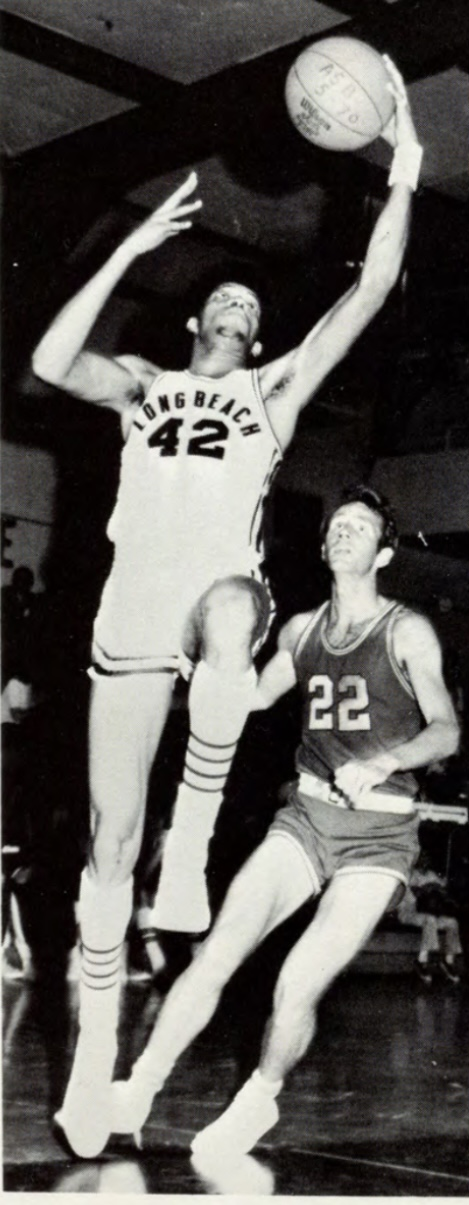
Ed Ratleff, Long Beach State, 1972 and 1973

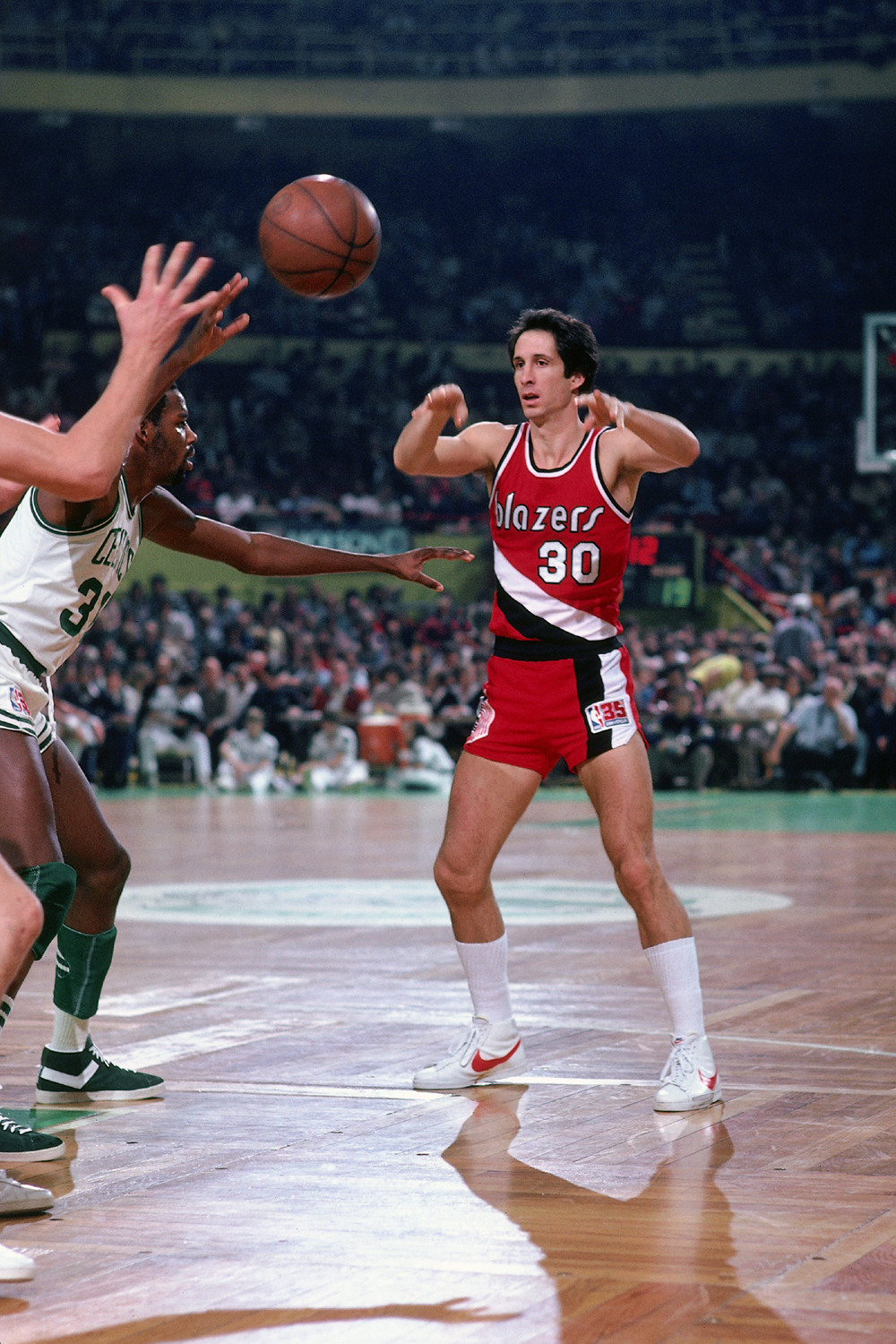
Bob Gross, Long Beach State, 1975

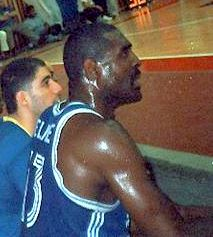
Kevin Magee, UC Irvine, 1981 and 1982

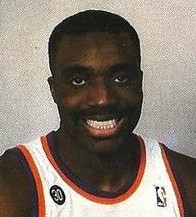
Armon Gilliam, UNLV, 1987

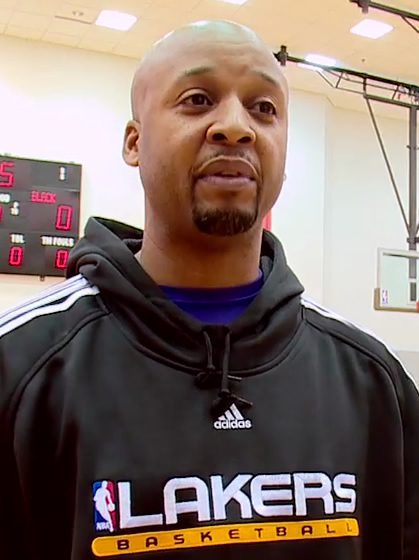
Brian Shaw, UC Santa Barbara, 1988

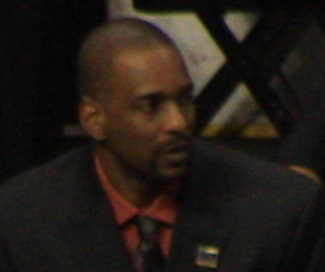
Stacey Augmon, UNLV, 1989

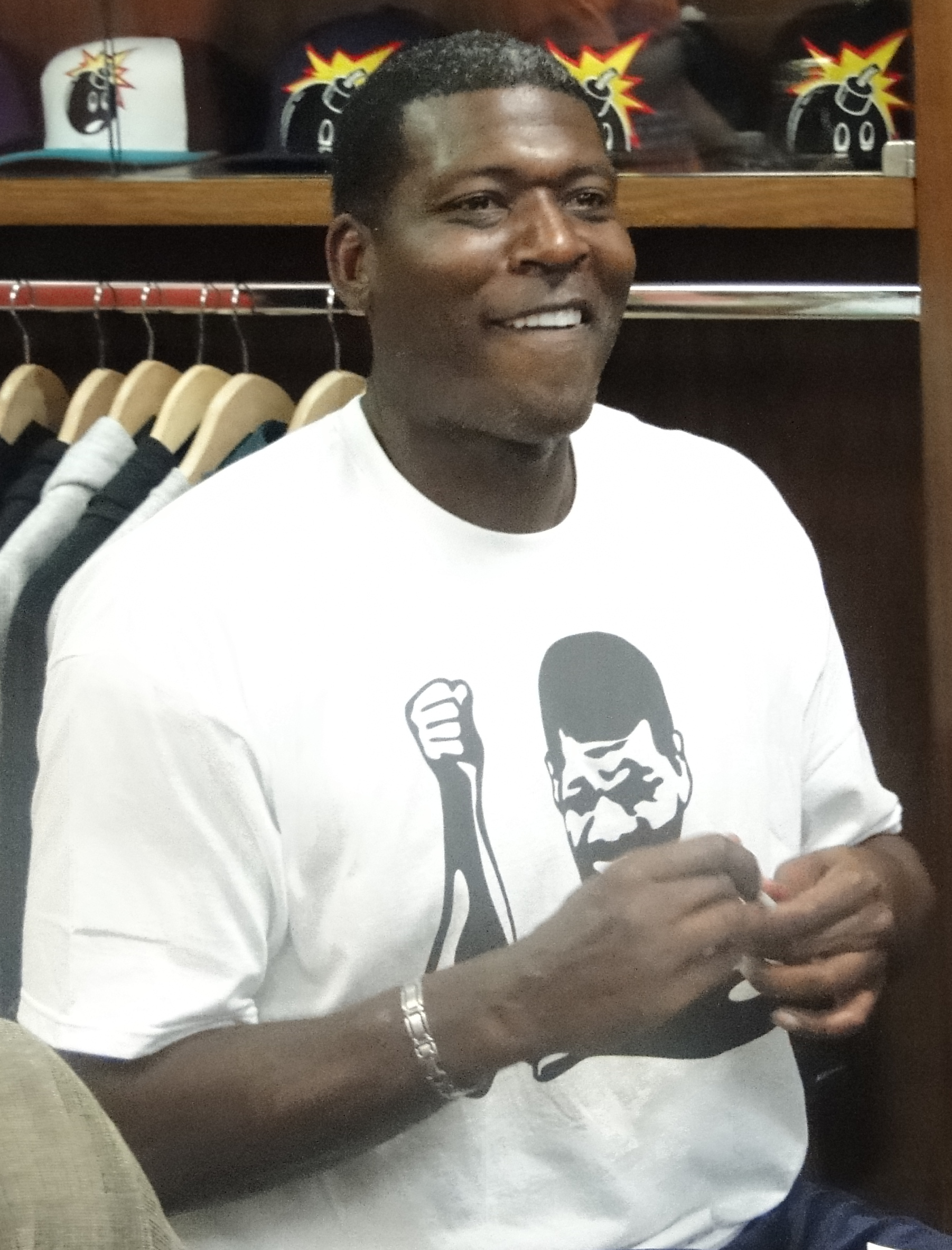
Larry Johnson, UNLV, 1990 and 1991

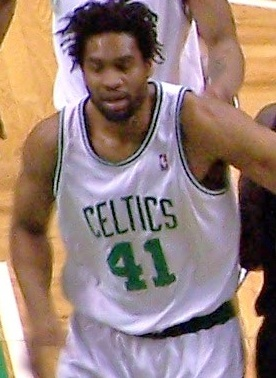
Michael Olowokandi, Pacific, 1998

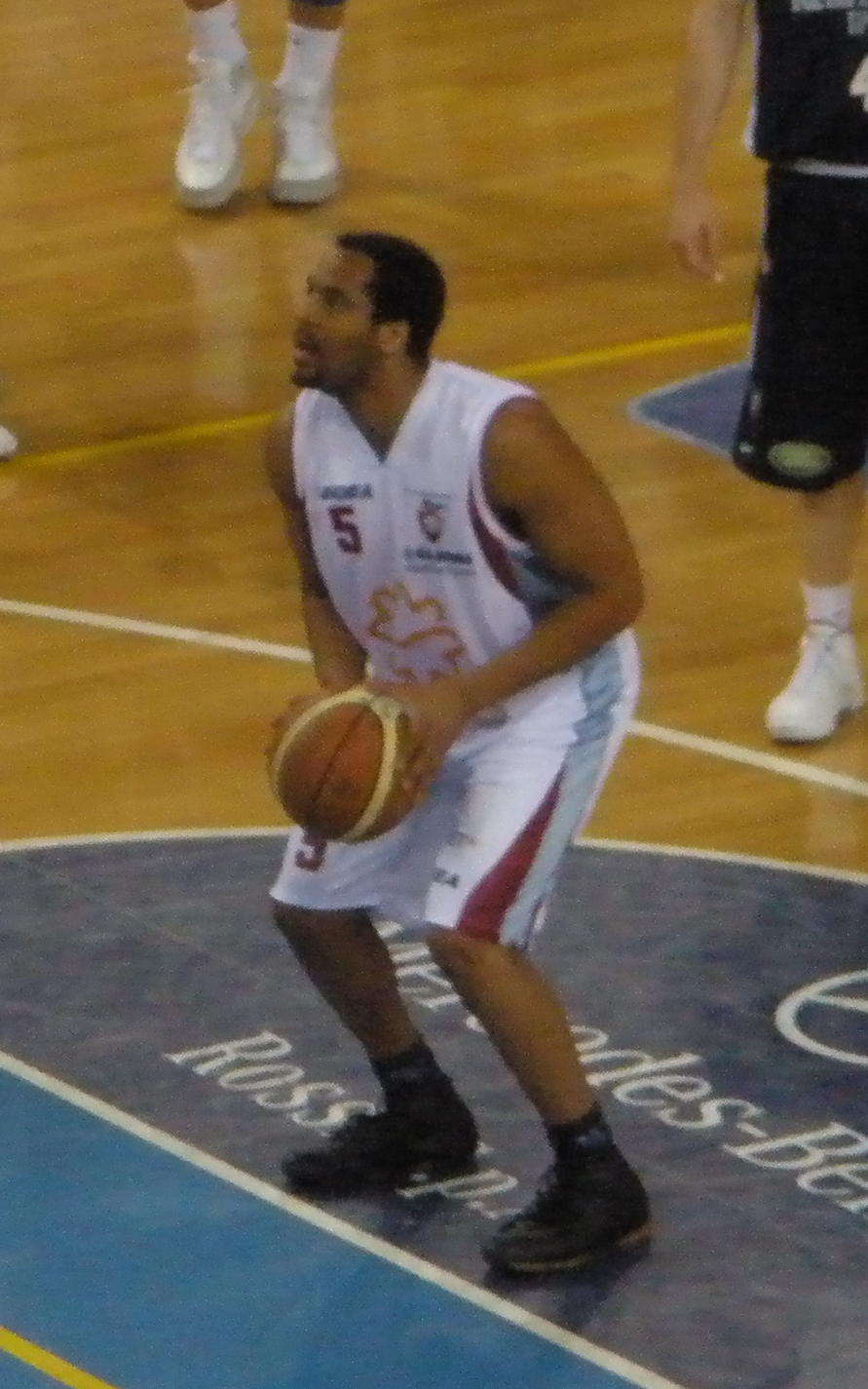
Jerry Green, UC Irvine, 2001 and 2002

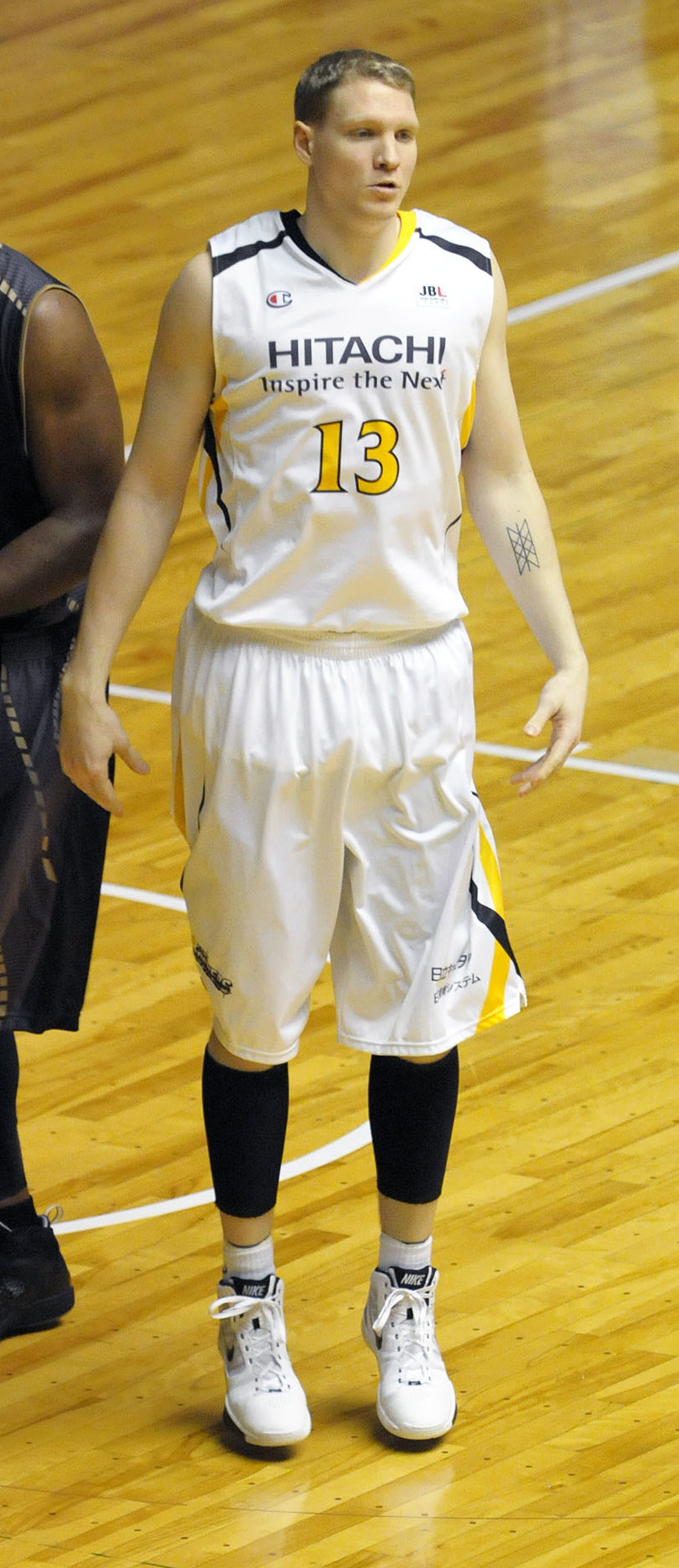
Christian Maråker, Pacific, 2006

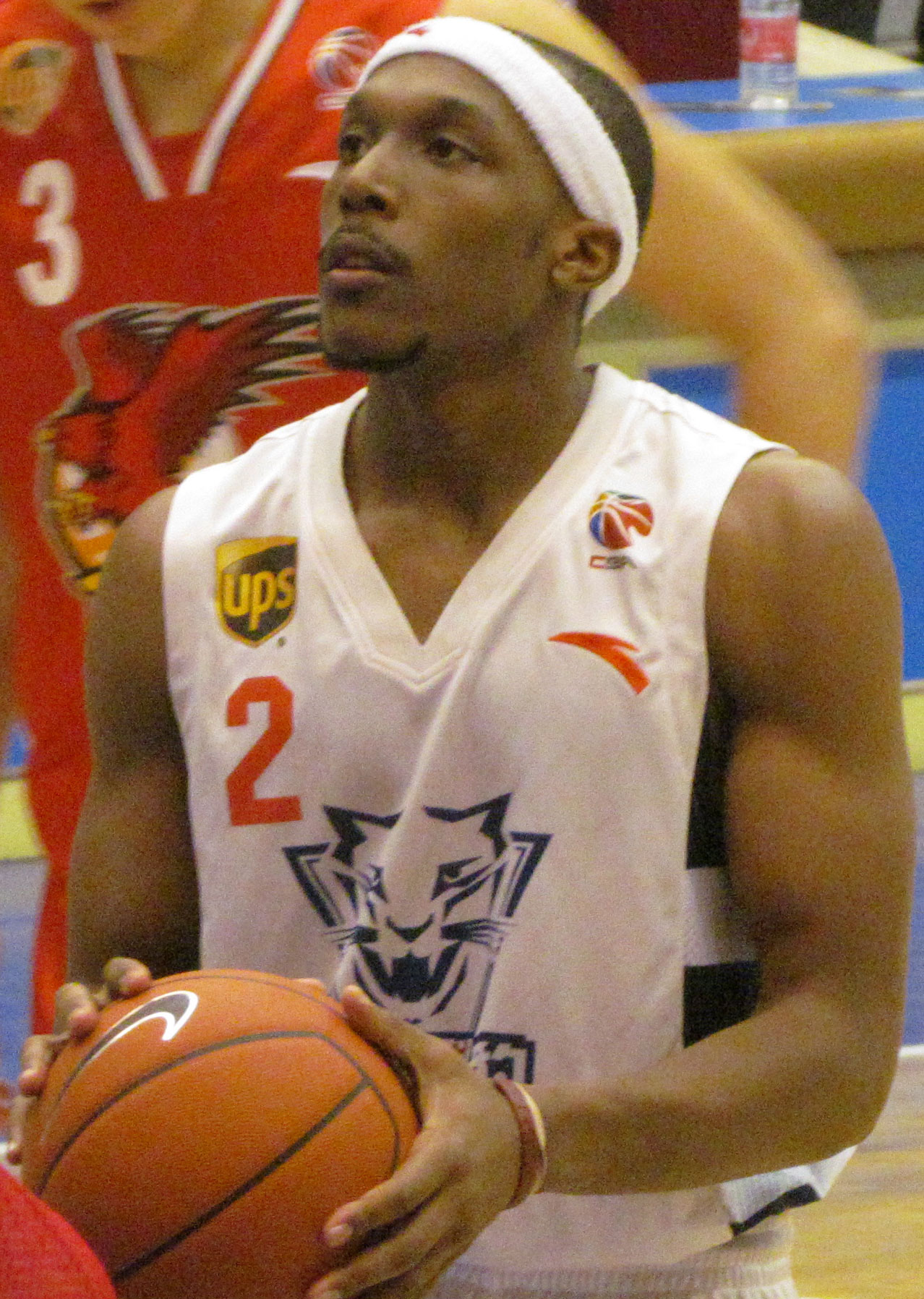
Josh Akognon, Cal State Fullerton, 2009

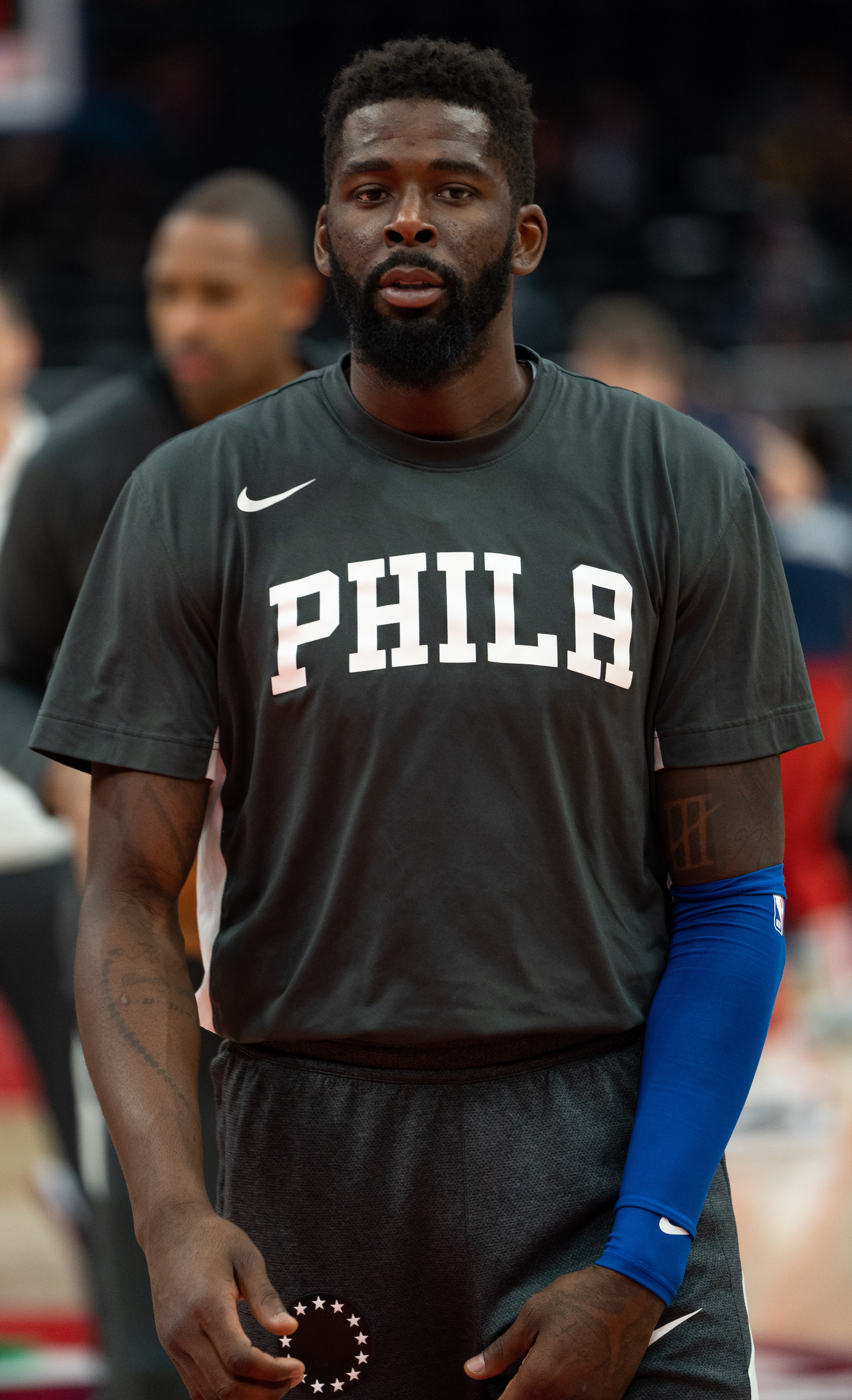
James Ennis, Long Beach State, 2013

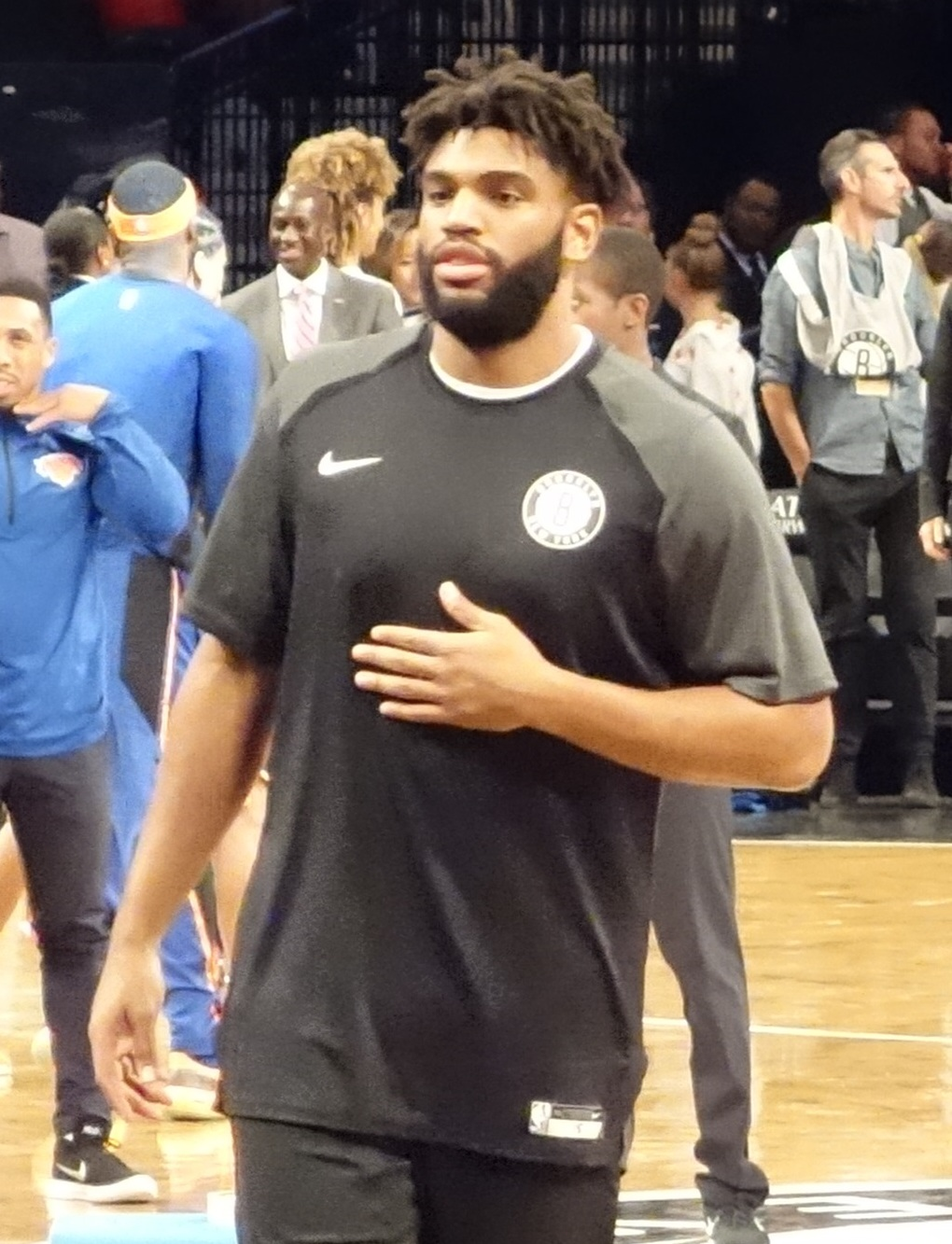
Alan Williams, UC Santa Barbara, 2014

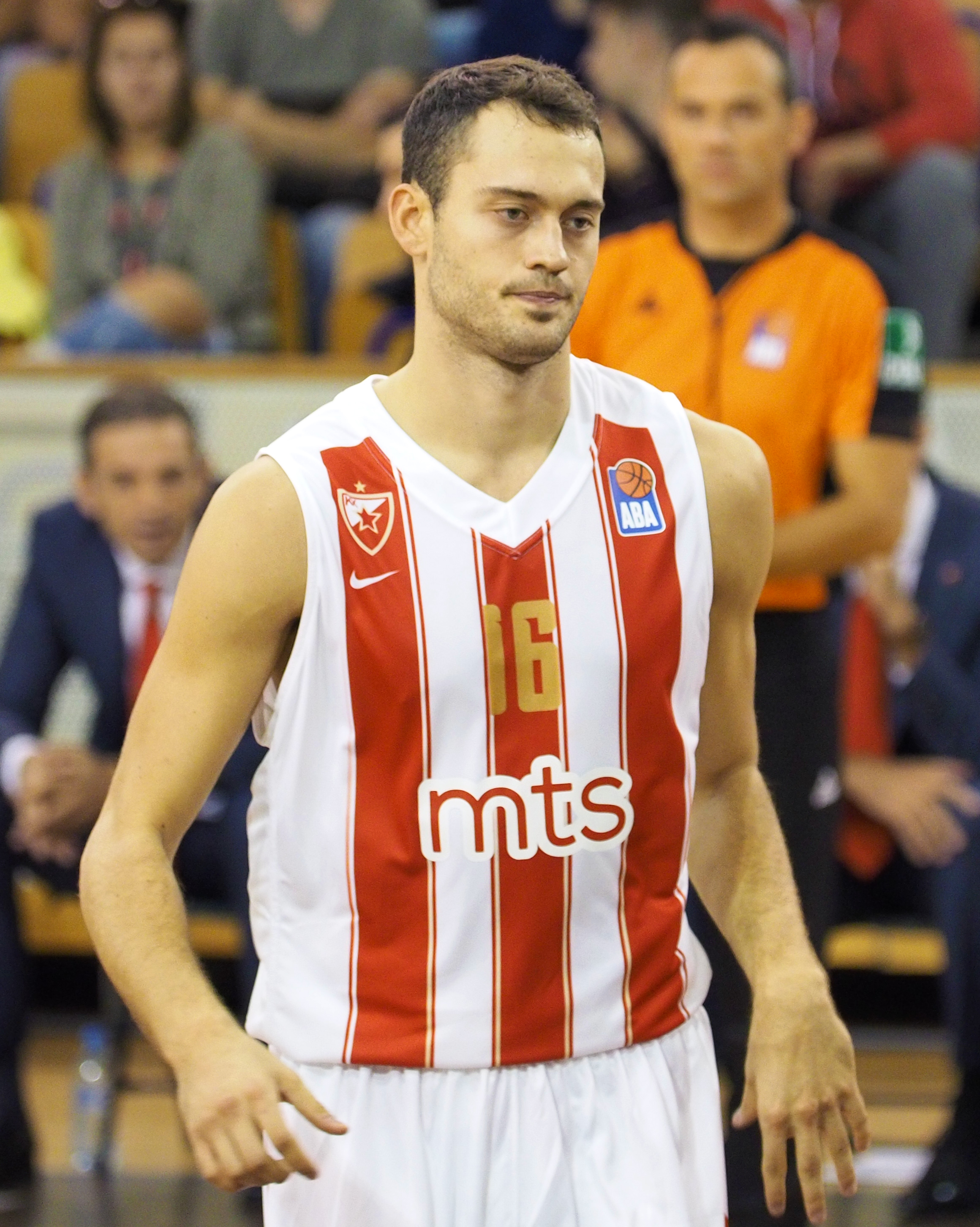
Stefan Janković, Hawaiʻi, 2016

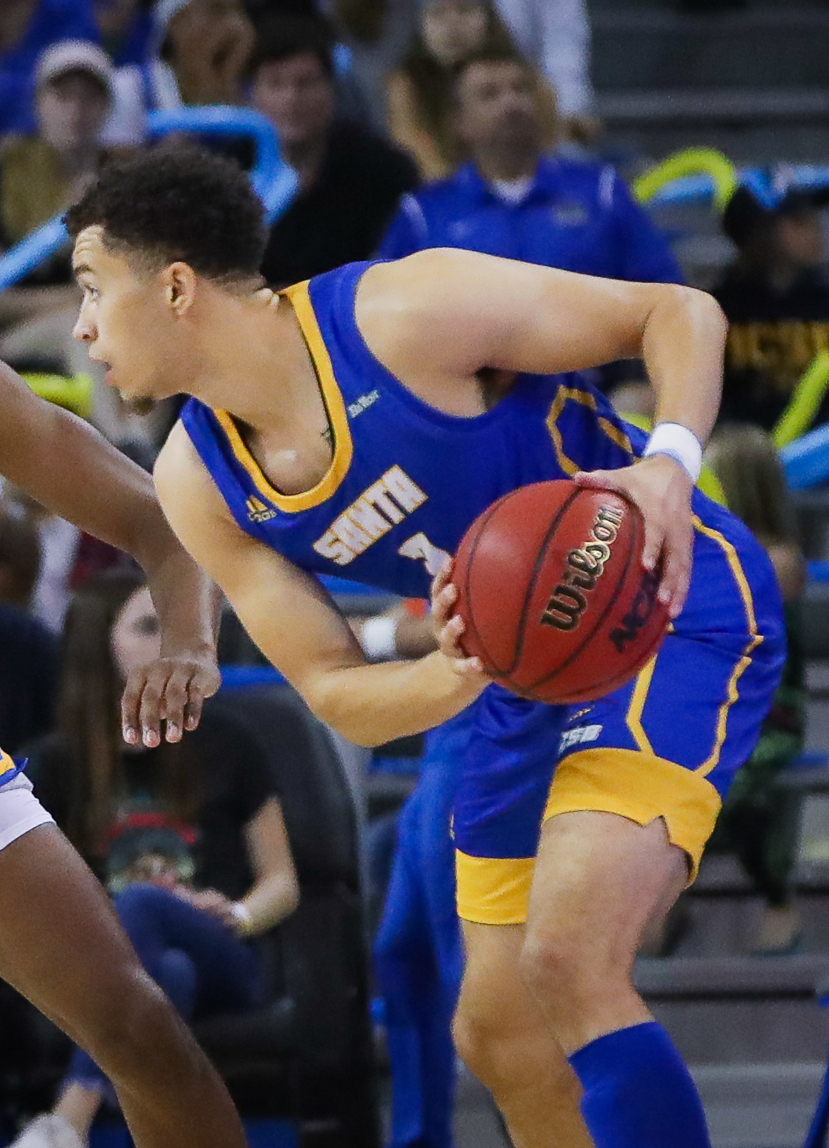
JaQuori McLaughlin, UC Santa Barbara, 2021

Season	Player	School	Position	Class	Reference
1969–70	George Trapp	Long Beach State	F / C	Junior	
1970–71	George Trapp (2)	Long Beach State	F / C	Senior	
1971–72	Ed Ratleff	Long Beach State	SG / SF	Junior	
1972–73	Ed Ratleff (2)	Long Beach State	SG / SF	Senior	
1973–74	Leonard Gray	Long Beach State	F	Senior	
1974–75	Bob Gross	Long Beach State	SF	Senior	
1975–76^{†}	Steve Copp	San Diego State	SF	Senior	
1975–76^{†}	Greg Bunch	Cal State Fullerton	F	Sophomore	
1976–77	Lloyd McMillian	Long Beach State	SF	Senior	
1977–78	Joel Kramer	San Diego State	SF	Senior	
1978–79	Ron Cornelius	Pacific	PF / C	Sophomore	
1979–80	Dean Hunger	Utah State	F	Senior	
1980–81	Kevin Magee	UC Irvine	PF	Junior	
1981–82	Kevin Magee (2)	UC Irvine	PF	Senior	
1982–83	Sidney Green	UNLV	C / PF	Senior	
1983–84	Richie Adams	UNLV	C	Junior	
1984–85	Richie Adams (2)	UNLV	C	Senior	
1985–86^{†}	Greg Grant	Utah State	F	Senior	
1985–86^{†}	Anthony Jones	UNLV	SG	Senior	
1986–87	Armon Gilliam	UNLV	PF	Senior	
1987–88	Brian Shaw	UC Santa Barbara	PG	Senior	
1988–89	Stacey Augmon	UNLV	SG / SF	Sophomore	
1989–90	Larry Johnson	UNLV	PF	Junior	
1990–91	Larry Johnson* (2)	UNLV	PF	Senior	
1991–92	Lucius Davis	UC Santa Barbara	F	Senior	
1992–93	J. R. Rider	UNLV	SG	Senior	
1993–94	Kebu Stewart	UNLV	F	Freshman	
1994–95	Eric Franson	Utah State	C	Junior	
1995–96	Raimonds Miglinieks	UC Irvine	PG	Senior	
1996–97	Faron Hand	Nevada	SF	Junior	
1997–98	Michael Olowokandi	Pacific	C	Senior	
1998–99	Roberto Bergersen	Boise State	SG	Senior	
1999–00	Mate Milisa	Long Beach State	C	Junior	
2000–01	Jerry Green	UC Irvine	PG	Junior	
2001–02	Jerry Green (2)	UC Irvine	PG	Senior	
2002–03	Branduinn Fullove	UC Santa Barbara	G	Junior	
2003–04	Miah Davis	Pacific	PG	Senior	
2004–05	David Doubley	Pacific	PG	Senior	
2005–06	Christian Maråker	Pacific	PF	Senior	
2006–07	Aaron Nixon	Long Beach State	SG	Senior	
2007–08^{†}	Scott Cutley	Cal State Fullerton	PF	Senior	
2007–08^{†}	Alex Harris	UC Santa Barbara	SG	Senior	
2008–09	Josh Akognon	Cal State Fullerton	PG	Senior	
2009–10	Orlando Johnson	UC Santa Barbara	SG	Sophomore	
2010–11	Casper Ware	Long Beach State	PG	Junior	
2011–12	Casper Ware (2)	Long Beach State	PG	Senior	
2012–13	James Ennis	Long Beach State	SF	Senior	
2013–14	Alan Williams	UC Santa Barbara	C	Junior	
2014–15	Corey Hawkins	UC Davis	G	Senior	
2015–16	Stefan Janković	Hawaiʻi	F	Junior	
2016–17	Luke Nelson	UC Irvine	SG	Senior	
2017–18	T. J. Shorts	UC Davis	PG	Junior	
2018–19	Lamine Diane	Cal State Northridge	PF	Freshman	
2019–20	Lamine Diane (2)	Cal State Northridge	PF	Sophomore	
2020–21	JaQuori McLaughlin	UC Santa Barbara	PG	Senior	
2021–22	Colin Slater	Long Beach State	SG	Senior	
2022–23	Ajay Mitchell	UC Santa Barbara	PG / SG	Sophomore	
2023–24	Elijah Pepper	UC Davis	PG	Graduate	
2024–25	Aniwaniwa Tait-Jones	UC San Diego	SF / SG	Senior	
2025–26	Josiah Davis	Cal State Northridge	PG	Senior	

== Winners by school ==
School (year joined)	Winners	Years
Long Beach State (1969)	13	1970, 1971, 1972, 1973, 1974, 1975, 1977, 2000, 2007, 2011, 2012, 2013, 2022
UNLV (1982) (Note: UNLV left in 1996 to join the Western Athletic Conference (WAC), and is now in the Mountain West Conference (MW).)	10	1983, 1984, 1985, 1986^{†}, 1987, 1989, 1990, 1991, 1993, 1994
UC Santa Barbara (1969) (Note: UC Santa Barbara joined the conference when it was founded in 1969, left to become an independent after the 1973–74 season, then rejoined in 1976. It will leave in 2027 to rejoin the West Coast Conference (WCC), in which it had been a member immediately before first joining the PCAA/Big West.)	8	1988, 1992, 2003, 2008^{†}, 2010, 2014, 2021, 2023
UC Irvine (1977)	6	1981, 1982, 1996, 2001, 2002, 2017
Pacific (1971) (Note: Pacific left for the WCC in 2013.)	5	1979, 1998, 2004, 2005, 2006
Cal State Fullerton (1974)	3	1976, 2008^{†}, 2009^{†}
Cal State Northridge (2001)	3	2019, 2020, 2026
UC Davis (2007)	3	2015, 2018, 2024
Utah State (1978) (Note: Utah State left in 2005 to join the WAC, and is now in the Pac-12 Conference.)	3	1980, 1986^{†}, 1995
San Diego State (1969) (Note: San Diego State left in 1978 to join the WAC, and is now in the Pac-12.)	2	1976^{†}, 1978
Boise State (1996) (Note: Boise State left in 2001 to join the WAC, and is now in the Pac-12.)	1	1999
Hawaiʻi (2012) (Note: Hawaiʻi left in 2026 to join the MW.)	1	2016
Nevada (1992) (Note: Nevada left in 2000 to join the WAC, and is now in the MW.)	1	1997
UC San Diego (2020) (Note: UC San Diego will leave in 2027 to join the WCC.)	1	2025
Cal Baptist (2026)	0	—
Cal Poly (1996)	0	—
Cal State Bakersfield (2020)	0	—
Sacramento State (2026)	0	—
UC Riverside (2001)	0	—
Utah Valley (2026)	0	—
