= Kevin Butler (streetball player) =

American streetball player

Personal information
- Listed height: 6 ft 3 in (1.91 m)
- Listed weight: 180 lb (82 kg)

Career information
- High school: St. Joseph Notre Dame (Alameda, California)
- College: UC Riverside (2000–2004)
- NBA draft: 2004: undrafted

Kevin Cortrell Butler is an American streetball player known for his exceptional dunking ability. He is also known for his appearances on the ESPN television show City Slam. Butler is from Oakland, California and is 6 foot 2 inches tall. Butler attended basketball powerhouse St. Joseph Notre Dame high school in Alameda, the same high school that produced Jason Kidd and several other high-profile All-American players. Following his decorated high school career, Butler went on to play at UC Riverside where he was a four-year starter and the recipient of several team and league-wide honors. Like his streetball moniker, "Bizness", Butler graduated from UCR in 2004 with a degree in business.

Butler went on to play for numerous teams and across several well-followed events – starting with streetball crew YPA. The high-flying Butler also competed in the slam dunk contest of City Slam in both the 2005 and 2006 seasons where he was one of just three contestants to reach the 60-inch barrier in the high-jump portion of the competition. In the 2005 finals, Butler placed fourth in the Chicago event, losing to eventual champ, Chris "Skywalker" Lowery. In the following 2006 season, Butler was the Oakland Regional winner. During this time, Butler continued to compete in the San Francisco Pro-Am.

Butler also played in the inaugural season for the then San Francisco Pilots (later renamed the San Francisco Rumble) of the reborn American Basketball Association. In 2007, Butler, along with other past winners and finalists from City Slam, assisted former NBA player Dee Brown during his 2007 Summer Slam Camp, which was described as the "world’s first slam dunk workout camp".
