= Alex Harris (basketball) =

American basketball player (born 1986)

Personal information
- Born: January 30, 1986 (age 40) Mission Viejo, California
- Listed height: 196 cm (6 ft 5 in)
- Listed weight: 90 kg (198 lb)

Career information
- High school: St. Joseph Notre Dame (Alameda, California)
- College: UC Santa Barbara (2004–2008)
- NBA draft: 2008: undrafted
- Playing career: 2008–2019
- Position: Shooting guard

Career history
- 2008–2009: PGE Turów Zgorzelec
- 2009–2010: Energa Czarni Slupsk
- 2010–2012: Ludwigsburg
- 2012–2013: Eisbären Bremerhaven
- 2013–2014: Walter Tigers Tübingen
- 2014–2015: Aries Trikala
- 2015–2016: Enel Brindisi
- 2016: AEK Larnaca
- 2017: Doxa Lefkadas
- 2017–2018: Regatas Corrientes
- 2018–2019: Hapoel Ramat Gan Givatayim

Career highlights
- Cypriot Super Cup winner (2016); Bundesliga All-Star (2011); Big West co-Player of the Year (2008); 2× First-team All-Big West (2007, 2008); AP honorable mention All-American (2008)

Alexander Cory Harris (born January 30, 1986) is an American former professional basketball player. He played eleven seasons in several European countries. Harris played collegiately for UC Santa Barbara where he was the 2008 Big West Conference co-Player of the Year. He currently is a P.E teacher at a school in Vallejo, California

== College career ==
Harris played high school basketball for St. Joseph Notre Dame (Alameda, California), leading them to a California Division 4 championship as a senior.

He joined the University of California at Santa Barbara, playing in the Big West Conference of the NCAA Division I, in 2004.

In his junior season in 2006–07, Harris made a leap in his production, raised his scoring average from 8.3 points per game to a Conference 21.1.

In his senior season, Harris was named to the preseason All-Big West team and continued his strong play, averaging 20.2 points per game. He led the Gauchos to the top seed in the 2008 Big West tournament and was named the Big West co-Player of the Year (with Cal State Fullerton's Scott Cutley). The team went to the 2008 National Invitation Tournament and at the close of the season Harris gained national recognition as an honorable mention All-American by the Associated Press.

== Professional career ==
Following the close of his college career, Harris went undrafted in the 2008 NBA draft. He signed with PGE Turów Zgorzelec of the Polish Basketball League, averaging 7.3 points per game in his first professional season. He then moved to Energa Czarni Slupsk for the 2009–10 season. Harris then moved to EnBW Ludwigsburg, and later Eisbären Bremerhaven in Germany's Bundesliga. He averaged 12.4 points per game with EnBW Ludwigsburg in 2011–12 and 7.7 the following season for Bremerhaven. He was selected for the 2011 Bundesliga All-Star game. For the 2013–14 season he signed with WALTER Tigers Tübingen. On December 21, 2014, he signed with Aries Trikala of Greece for the rest of the 2014–15 Greek Basket League season.

On July 22, 2015, Harris signed with Enel Brindisi of the Italian Serie A.

On December 5, 2018, Harris signed with the Israeli team Hapoel Ramat Gan Givatayim for the rest of the season. In 23 games played for Ramat Gan, he averaged 17.3 points, 5.5 rebounds and 2 assists per game, while shooting 38.7 percent from three-point range.
