= Jack Ryan (streetball) =

American streetball player

Jack Ryan is an American streetball player from Brooklyn, New York. Ryan began playing basketball at John Jay High School, where, as a senior, he averaged 26 ppg. Ryan later took his game to East 5th St. Park in Brooklyn, where he mastered the tricks and shots he became well known for. In his first season in a recreational league at West 4th, Ryan played one game against former Detroit Pistons player Phil Sellers and scored 44 points.

Ryan is most well known for his proficient 3-point shooting. According to an article written by Bobbito Garcia about Ryan in Slam Magazine Streetball Special Collector's Issue, Chris Mullin once described Jack as the best shooter he'd ever seen who hadn't played in the NBA. The article also states Peter Vecsey got Ryan a tryout with the New Jersey Nets in 1990, but was the second-to-last man cut, ending Ryan's NBA aspirations. In May 2003 Ryan was named as one of "Slam Magazines Greatest Playground Ballers of All Time." Ryan further proved his mastery of the 3-point shot when he won the 2005 City Slam 3-Point Shooting Championships, which aired on ESPN. In a close final, Ryan edged out fellow streetball sharpshooter Deshun "Father Time" Jackson to take the title.

Ryan's story was featured on the cover of The New York Times Sports section on December 3, 2003. He was also featured in an episode of the 2019 Netflix documentary series Losers.

== Film ==
A 2020 film Blackjack: The Jackie Ryan Story, explores Jack Ryan's history and attempted entry into the NBA.
