= Burning the Process =

Studio album by Pressure 4-5
- Released: October 2, 2001
- Studio: NRG (North Hollywood, California); Royaltone (North Hollywood, California)
- Genre: Alternative metal; alternative rock; nu metal
- Length: 35:09
- Label: DreamWorks
- Producer: Jay Baumgardner

Pressure 4-5 chronology
Antechnology (1999)	Burning the Process (2001)

Burning the Process is the debut studio album by American rock band Pressure 4-5, released on October 2, 2001, by DreamWorks Records. It features 11 tracks, three of which ("These Hands", "Beat the World" and "Even Worse") were featured on a prior three-song sampler release and were re-recorded for this album. This would prove to be Pressure 4-5's first and only major label album, as the group disbanded in 2003.

== Composition and lyrics ==
Musically, Burning the Process has been described as an alternative metal, alternative rock, and nu metal album. According to vocalist Adam Rich, the band's style fell under heavy rock rather than metal. Although some songs on the album, such as "Even Worse", step into rap metal territory, Rich claimed in an interview that the band wanted to distance themselves from the rap metal scene. Regarding the album's musical style, Rich said: "we wanted to make a record that reflected our love of hard rock music and it is sort of metal although we don’t really describe ourselves as metal."

Much of the album's lyrics deal with overcoming problems such as grieving and, particularly in the song "Even Worse", irrationality of religion. "Beat the World" deals with the sudden death of Rich's best friend.

== Touring and promotion ==
Pressure 4-5 acquired a spot on the Second Stage of Ozzfest 2001. Through the remainder of the year, they joined an MTV-sponsored club tour with groups like Alien Ant Farm and Hoobastank. The band also performed their own fourteen-date tour beginning on March 31, 2002, before joining Lit on April 18. Next would be the MTV2 Presents Tour with DreamWorks labelmates Apex Theory and British band Lostprophets, where they previewed new material.

Two of the album's songs were released as promotional singles ("Beat the World" and "Melt Me Down"). "Beat the World" was the first promotional single released off Burning the Process. Its music video was directed by Marc Webb. In 2002, "Melt Me Down" was released as the album's second promotional single. It has also been released as a music video.

In November 2003, the album's rights transferred to Universal Music Group, as that month UMG reached a $100 million agreement to acquire DreamWorks Records from DreamWorks Pictures.

== Critical reception ==
Professional ratings
Review scores
Source	Rating
AllMusic	4/5 stars

Burning the Process was largely well received. According to AllMusic's Bradley Torreano, the band tried to "bring back the alternative metal sounds of the mid-'90s" on the album. He noted that there's a strong Helmet influence on much of the album, but also claimed that there's "a healthy edge that brings to mind vintage Life of Agony on certain tracks." He praised Adam Rich's voice, saying that it is "the high point of the album" and describing it as "an emotional tool that often sounds like Helmet's Page Hamilton", but that also "brings to mind indie rock bands such as Jawbox." He also stated that the songs that step into rap metal territory, such as "Even Worse", are "the only low points of an otherwise impressive debut." Torreano regarded the album as demonstrating "a band with a lot of promise and ambition" and said that it will appeal to "anyone interested in well-crafted, quality heavy metal."

Jessica Jardine of Daily Nexus also praised vocalist Adam Rich in her October 2001 review, stating he had "perfected the art of the catchy hook." However, she goes on to say "moments exist when one longs for the band to let out its inner Korn and pop some eardrums. There are flashes in tracks like 'Stares' where one relishes hearing Rich tear apart his precious vocal chords as the band flies through charging guitar riffs."

DynamicRock gave Burning the Process 8.5 out of 10, labelling it "one of the year's most riveting and unforgettable releases". They compared the album's sound to Onesidezero, Cold, Helmet, and Quicksand, remarking, "far removed from the aggro-driven, grunge-metal of Antechnology, Pressure 4-5's major-label debut, Burning the Process, is an 11-track odyssey of passion, beauty, and artistic creativity. Combining thoughtfully crafted harmonics with emotionally-driven vocals, Pressure 4-5 has vastly improved as musicians."

== Track listing ==
All music by Pressure 4-5.

No.	Title	Length
1.	"These Hands"	3:07
2.	"Beat the World"	3:00
3.	"Melt Me Down"	2:46
4.	"Enough"	2:59
5.	"Dehydration"	3:20
6.	"Stares"	3:51
7.	"Pieces"	2:44
8.	"New Wave"	3:06
9.	"Even Worse"	2:45
10.	"Proven"	2:43
11.	"Into Yesterday"	4:50

== Personnel ==
Pressure 4-5

- Adam Rich – lead and backing vocals
- Joe Schmidt – rhythm guitar
- Mark Barry – lead guitar
- Lyle Mckeany – bass guitar
- Tom Schmidt – drums

Production

- Jay Baumgardner – producer, mixing
- Dan Certa – engineering
- Howard Karp – assistant engineering
- James Murray – assistant engineering
- Tom Baker – mastering

Additional musicians

- David Campbell – string arrangements, viola
- Larry Corbett – cello
- Joel Derouin – violin
- Brooks Wackerman – percussion

== Charts ==
=== Album ===
Year	Chart	Position
2001	Billboard 200	177
2001	Heatseekers Albums	5

=== Singles ===
Year	Single	Chart	Position
2001	"Beat the World"	Billboard Mainstream Rock Tracks	39
