= Emmanuel Bibb =

American basketball player (born 1973)

Personal information
- Born: February 25, 1973 (age 53)
- Listed height: 6 ft 2 in (1.88 m)

Career information
- High school: Denby (Detroit, Michigan)
- College: Detroit Mercy (1992–1994)
- Position: Shooting guard

Emmanuel Bibb (born February 25, 1973), also known as Hard Work, is an American streetball player from Detroit, Michigan. He is 6-foot 2-inches tall and plays shooting guard. In streetball, he is best known for his appearances on the AND1 Mixtape Tour, which airs on ESPN.

In conventional basketball, Bibb currently plays for the Detroit Panthers of the ABA. Bibb played college basketball at the University of Detroit Mercy. While in high school, playing for Detroit Denby, Bibb finished in 10th place for Michigan's High School Mr. Basketball award for 1991, placing behind future NBA players Chris Webber (winner), Jalen Rose (runner-up), and Voshon Lenard (7th place).

Bibb appears as a character in the video game AND 1 Streetball.
