= Branduinn Fullove =

American basketball player (born 1980)

Personal information
- Born: September 26, 1980 (age 46) Los Angeles, California, U.S.
- Listed height: 6 ft 4 in (1.93 m)
- Listed weight: 210 lb (95 kg)

Career information
- High school: Simi Valley (Simi Valley, California)
- College: UC Santa Barbara (2000–2004)
- NBA draft: 2004: undrafted
- Position: Guard

Career history
- 2006: Otago Nuggets
- 2006–2007: Central Entrerriano

Career highlights
- Big West Player of the Year (2003); 2× First-team All-Big West (2003, 2004); Big West All-Freshman team (2001)

Branduinn Fullove (born September 26, 1980) is an American former professional basketball player. He played college basketball for the UC Santa Barbara Gauchos.

== Early life ==
Fullove was born in the Mission Hills neighbourhood of Los Angeles, California. He attended Simi Valley High School where he averaged 24.9 points, 6.3 rebounds and 3.4 steals per game as a senior.

== College career ==
Fullove played for the UC Santa Barbara Gauchos from 2000 to 2004. He was selected to the Big West All-Freshman team in 2001 as he averaged 12.2 points, 5.0 rebounds and 3.2 assists per game. Fullove was named the Big West Conference Men's Basketball Player of the Year as a junior in 2003 while he averaged a team-high 14.6 points per game. He was selected to the first-team All-Big West during his senior season in 2004.

== Professional career ==
Fullove played professionally in Hungary, New Zealand, Argentina and Mexico. He played for the Otago Nuggets during the 2006 New Zealand NBL season. Fullove joined Central Entrerriano of the Liga Nacional de Básquet for the 2006–07 season.

== Later life ==
Fullove began coaching after his basketball career and established a basketball academy for local students. He served as the cross country coach at Crespi Carmelite High School in 2015. Fullove works as an assistant store manager for Amazon Fresh in Seattle, Washington.
