= Red Bull King of the Rock Tournament =

The Red Bull King of the Rock Tournament is a one-on-one street ball (basketball) tournament sponsored by Red Bull. It occurred annually at “The Yard” of Alcatraz Island in San Francisco Bay from 2010 to 2013. Initially, the tournament was open solely to the top 64 players from the West Coast of the United States. In 2013, however, qualifiers for the event were held in 20 U.S. cities, as well as in 23 other countries, to find the top 64 players worldwide.

== History ==
The first King of the Rock Tournament was held September 18, 2010. It was the first official sporting event ever held on Alcatraz and the first time basketball had been played there since the inmates left 50 years earlier. Players from the West Coast of the United States competed to fill the top 64 spots. In the end, Izeah “Clutch” Bowman was crowned the first ever “King of the Rock”. Starting in 2011, the event was opened to competitors from across the U.S. and around the globe. Washington D.C. native Hugh “Baby Shaq” Jones was crowned “King of the Rock” two times consecutively in 2011 and 2012.
In 2013, 64 finalists representing 25 countries competed and eventually 36-year-old L.A. native Tarron “The Beast” Williams was crowned the fourth and final “King of the Rock” on September 28, 2013. It has been rumored that the event will move to Taiwan in 2014, but official word has not yet been given.

The event brought 32 King of the Rock finalists from 23 countries to face off on the prison exercise yards of Samasana Island, Taiwan, and crowned the 2014 champion Kivanc Dinler from Turkey.

During the first and only global one-on-one street basketball tournament ever held in Asia, the first-ever Queen of the Rock, Stanislava Fedotova from Russia, was also crowned.

== Rules ==
The rules of the tournament are much like those of typical street ball. Both qualifying and finals rounds incorporate the normal one-on-one set-up of players going head-to-head on an outdoor court, using a single elimination tournament bracket. Shots count as 2 or 3 points and five fouls (or 1 technical foul) mark an automatic disqualification. Four half court games are played simultaneously. Each has their own referee, court manager, and scoreboard. Winners proceed immediately onto the next court to face another player. Games are five minutes each with a running clock and 15 second shot clock. The continuous nature of the competition makes the player's stamina and physical endurance a key component of success. Participants must be 16 years or older. Those under 18 required consent of a parent or guardian.

A coin toss was used to determine first possession of the ball and possession would then alternate throughout the face-off. If a player was fouled in the act of shooting a successful basket, the additional point would be granted and possession would change. It is up to the referee's discretion whether a 2-minute time out would be granted for injury. In the event of a tie, 2 minutes of overtime would be granted with first possession decided by coin toss.

== Awards ==
In the qualifying round, a cash prize of $1,000 and a free trip to the finals in San Francisco was awarded to first place. A cash prize of $250 was awarded to second place.

In the final round at Alcatraz, a custom trophy, cash prize of $20,000, and the title “King of the Rock” was awarded to the overall winner. A $1,000 cash prize was awarded to both the second-place winner, and the winner of the dunk contest.
