= Dean Hunger =

American basketball player (born 1958)

Personal information
- Born: November 30, 1958 (age 67) Provo, Utah, U.S.
- Listed height: 6 ft 8 in (2.03 m)
- Listed weight: 215 lb (98 kg)

Career information
- High school: Davis (Kaysville, Utah)
- College: Utah State (1976–1980)
- NBA draft: 1980: 4th round, 84th overall pick
- Drafted by: Houston Rockets
- Position: Power forward

Career highlights
- PCAA Player of the Year (1980); 2× First-team All-PCAA (1979, 1980); First-team Academic All-American (1980)
- Stats at Basketball Reference

William Dean Hunger (born November 30, 1958) is an American former basketball player. He is known for his college basketball career at Utah State University, where in 1980 he was the Pacific Coast Athletic Association Player of the Year and an Academic All-American.

Hunger led Davis High School in Kaysville, Utah to the Utah 3-A championship as a junior, scoring 16 points in the state championship game against American Fork High School. His college decision came down to Utah State and Brigham Young, with Hunger eventually deciding to commit to the Aggies as he felt the program had prioritized him more highly.

In Hunger's first two seasons, Utah State played as an independent, with Hunger averaging 7.3 and 12.2 points per game as a freshman and sophomore. Early in his sophomore year, he overcame a fractured cheekbone that threatened to derail the season. As a junior, the Aggies joined the Pacific Coast Athletic Association (now known as the Big West Conference). Hunger quickly established himself as one of the conference's top players, averaging 15.1 points and 7.2 rebounds per game and earning first-team All-PCAA honors. As a senior in the 1979–80 season, Hunger improved his averages to 20.8 points and 8.6 rebounds and led the team to their second straight NCAA Tournament berth. At the conclusion of the year, Hunger was named conference player of the year. He added national recognition as well, earning Academic All-American honors.

Following his graduation from Utah State, Hunger was drafted in the fourth round of the 1980 NBA draft (84th pick overall) by the Houston Rockets. However, he never played in the National Basketball Association. After failing to make the Rockets’ roster, Hunger entered a career in banking.
