= Antechnology =

EP by Pressure 4-5
- Released: 1999
- Genre: Alternative metal
- Label: Dripping
- Producer: Adam Rich

Pressure 4-5 chronology
Antechnology (1999)	Burning the Process (2001)

Antechnology is an EP released by American rock band Pressure 4-5. It was released independently on Dripping Records in 1999. After the success of this EP, the band was picked up by DreamWorks Records to go on to release their first and final full-length album.

== Music ==
The EP is noted for having a more aggressive sound compared to the band's major label debut, Burning the Process. In a 2001 interview, vocalist Adam Rich remarked, "[With] Antechnology we did not know what we wanted to do. We knew that we wanted to play heavy music but I hadn't gotten into melody and things like that. I really didn't think about song writing. We had a goal just to write as many songs as we possibly could and come up with as much new material as possible. [But] that is how you evolve as a band, to keep writing and playing - and those [Antechnology] were just the songs that came out of it."

== Track listing ==
All lyrics are written by Adam Rich; all music is composed by Pressure 4-5.

No.	Title	Length
1.	"Delaysion"	2:53
2.	"4or"	4:14
3.	"N"	3:15
4.	"Dripping"	2:49
5.	"P.M.A"	3:29
6.	"11"	2:44

== Personnel ==
Pressure 4-5

- Adam Rich – vocals
- Mark Barry – guitar
- Joe Schmidt – turntables
- Lyle Mckeany – bass
- Jake Fowler – drums

Production

- Adam Rich – producer
- Todd Rosenberg – engineering, mixing
- Mark Casselman – mastering
