= Josiah Davis =

Canadian basketball player (born 2003)

No. 4 – Cal State Northridge Matadors
- Position: Shooting guard
- League: Big West Conference

Personal information
- Born: February 4, 2003 (age 23) Kitchener, Ontario, Canada
- Listed height: 6 ft 3 in (1.91 m)
- Listed weight: 195 lb (88 kg)

Career information
- High school: Teays Valley Christian School (Teays Valley, West Virginia)
- College: West Virginia (2022–2023); Tennessee Tech (2023–2024); Niagara (2024–2025); Cal State Northridge (2025–present)
- NBA draft: 2026: undrafted

Career highlights
- Big West Player of the Year (2026); First-team All-Big West (2026)

Josiah Davis (born February 4, 2003) is a Canadian college basketball player for the Cal State Northridge Matadors of the Big West Conference. He previously played for the Niagara Purple Eagles, the Tennessee Tech Golden Eagles, and the West Virginia Mountaineers.

== High school career ==
Davis grew up in Kitchener, Ontario and attended Teays Valley Christian School in West Virginia. He averaged 20.8 points and 4.7 rebounds per game as a junior, helping Teays Valley Christian to a 19-9 record. As a senior, he averaged 19 points, 9.4 rebounds, 7.3 assists, 2.2 steals and 0.9 blocks per game. Davis led Teays Valley to a NACA National Championship, scoring 34 points in the title game against Marysville Christian School. A three star recruit, he committed to play college basketball at West Virginia.

== College career ==
Davis played sparingly in six games for West Virginia as a freshman before opting to transfer to Tennessee Tech. As a sophomore, Davis averaged 12.9 points, 4.6 rebounds and 2.3 assists per game. Following the season he entered the transfer portal and ultimately picked Niagara. Davis averaged 9.4 points, 3.5 rebounds, and 3.1 assists per game as a junior. He transferred to Cal State Northridge for his senior season. As a senior, Davis averaged 15.9 points, 4.6 rebounds, and a league-leading 7.4 assists per game. Davis was named Big West Conference Player of the Year as well as Newcomer of the Year.

== National team career ==
Davis represented Canada at the 2019 FIBA Under-16 Americas Championship in Belém, Brazil. In six games, he averaged 4.8 points, 3.3 rebounds, and 2.0 assists per game, helping Canada finish in second.
