= Jay Nagle =

American basketball player (born 2000)

No. 5 – Tigers Tübingen
- Position: Power forward
- League: BBL

Personal information
- Born: April 10, 2000 (age 26) Vacaville, California, U.S.
- Listed height: 6 ft 9 in (2.06 m)
- Listed weight: 216 lb (98 kg)

Career information
- High school: Will C. Wood (Vacaville, California)
- College: UC Santa Barbara (2018–2022); Idaho State (2022–2023)
- NBA draft: 2023: undrafted
- Playing career: 2023–present

Career history
- 2023–2024: Tkibuli Orbi
- 2024: Maroussi
- 2024–present: Tigers Tübingen

John Joseph “Jay” Nagle III (born April 10, 2000) is an American professional basketball player for the Tigers Tübingen of the Basketball Bundesliga (BBL). He plays at the power forward position. He played college basketball for the UC Santa Barbara and Idaho State.

== High school ==
Playing for Will C. Wood High School, Nagle was selected in the first-team All-Monticello Empire League. He was also a McDonalds All-America nominee.

== College ==
Nagle played from 2018 until 2022 for UC Santa Barbara, mainly coming of the bench. During his final season with the Gauchos, he averaged 1 point and one rebound per game.

In 2022, he entered the transfer portal. For his final college year, he played with Idaho State, averaging 5 points and 4.3 rebounds per game.

== Professional career ==
In 2023, Nagle joined Tkibuli Orbi in Georgia. After one season with Orbi, Nagle moved to Maroussi of the Greek Basketball League. In November 2024, Nagle joined the Tigers Tübingen of the Basketball Bundesliga (BBL).
