= Lucius Davis =

American basketball player (born 1970)

Personal information
- Born: July 20, 1970 (age 56) Fresno County, California, U.S.
- Listed height: 6 ft 7 in (2.01 m)
- Listed weight: 220 lb (100 kg)

Career information
- High school: Piedmont Hills (San Jose, California)
- College: UC Santa Barbara (1988–1992)
- NBA draft: 1992: undrafted
- Playing career: 1992–2005
- Position: Small forward

Career history
- 1992: Apollon Patras
- 1993–1995: Deportivo Roca
- 1995–1996: Papagou
- 1996–1997: Mens Sana Siena
- 1997–2002: Isuzu Motors Giga Cats
- 2002–2004: Maccabi Rishon LeZion
- 2004–2005: Keravnos

Career highlights
- Greek League All-Star (1996 I); Israel League top scorer (2004); Cypriot Cup winner (2005); JBL Super League top scorer (2001); Big West Player of the Year (1992); 2× First-team All-Big West (1991, 1992); Big West Sixth Man of the Year (1990)

Lucius Cecil Davis (born July 20, 1970) is an American former professional basketball player who played the forward position. He played for the Isuzu GigaCats in Japan, and for Maccabi Rishon LeZion in the Israeli Basketball Premier League. He was the top scorer in the 2004 Israel Basketball Premier League.

== Personal life ==
Davis is a San Jose, California, native. During his basketball playing career, he was listed at a height of 6 ft 7 in (201 cm) tall, and a weight 220 pounds (100 kg).

== Basketball career ==
=== College career ===
Davis attended and played basketball for Piedmont Hills High School. He was named the 1988 Mercury News All-County and Player of the Year.

After high school, Davis attended the University of California, Santa Barbara, where he played college basketball for the Gauchos. In 1988–89, Davis came off the bench as a freshman. As a sophomore, he was the Big West Conference's Sixth Man of the Year. In 1990–91, he was the team's leading scorer at 16.0 points per game, and was All-Big West. In his senior year, 1991–92, he led the Big West with 22.2 points per game, the second-highest total in school history, led the conference with 644 points, led the Big West with 225 field goals, and his 194 free throws which led the conference were at the time the third-most made in a season by a player in the Big West. He was Big West Player of the Year, First Team All-Big West, All-District, All-Region, and Honorable Mention All-American.

=== Professional career ===
The Los Angeles Times reported Davis to be one of the possible second-round picks of the 1992 NBA draft, but he ultimately was not selected by any NBA team in the draft. He was selected in the 3rd round (39th overall) of the Continental Basketball Association (CBA) draft by the Omaha Racers. In late 1992, he played for Apollon Patras in Greece's top-tier level Basket League. In 1993, he joined Deportivo Roca of the Liga Nacional de Básquet of Argentina. In his first season with the club, he averaged 27.3 points per game. He also stayed with the club for a second season; he scored a total of 2,608 points, in 97 appearances, in the Liga Nacional de Básquet, for an average of 26.9 points per game. He then played with the Greek club Papagou, and with them he averaged 25.4 points per game in the 1995–96 season.

In 1996, Davis was noticed by Italian basketball agent and sports writer Federico Buffa, and he was then signed by the Italian Lega Basket Serie A club Mens Sana Siena. He played in 28 games with the team, averaging 22.1 points, 4.2 rebounds, 1.4 assists and 2.5 steals per game. From 1997 to 2002, he played for the Isuzu GigaCats in Japan; in 1998, he ranked third in scoring in the Japanese league, at 21.3 points per game, and he went on to lead the 2000–01 JBL Super League season in scoring, at 25.1 points per game.

Davis played at the small forward position for Maccabi Rishon LeZion of the Israeli Basketball Premier League, where he averaged 25.0 points per game, in the 2002–03 season. He was the Israeli Premier League Top Scorer in the 2003–04 season. In the 2004–05 season, he played in Cyprus for the Cypriot League club Keravnos: he competed in the 2004–05 FIBA Europe Cup and won the 2005 edition of the Cypriot Cup.

== Honors ==
Davis is a member of the UCSB Intercollegiate Athletics Hall of Fame. In 2013, he was honored by the Gauchos, as he was named the fifth men's basketball "Legend of the 'Dome".
