= Jerry Green (basketball, born 1980) =

American basketball player

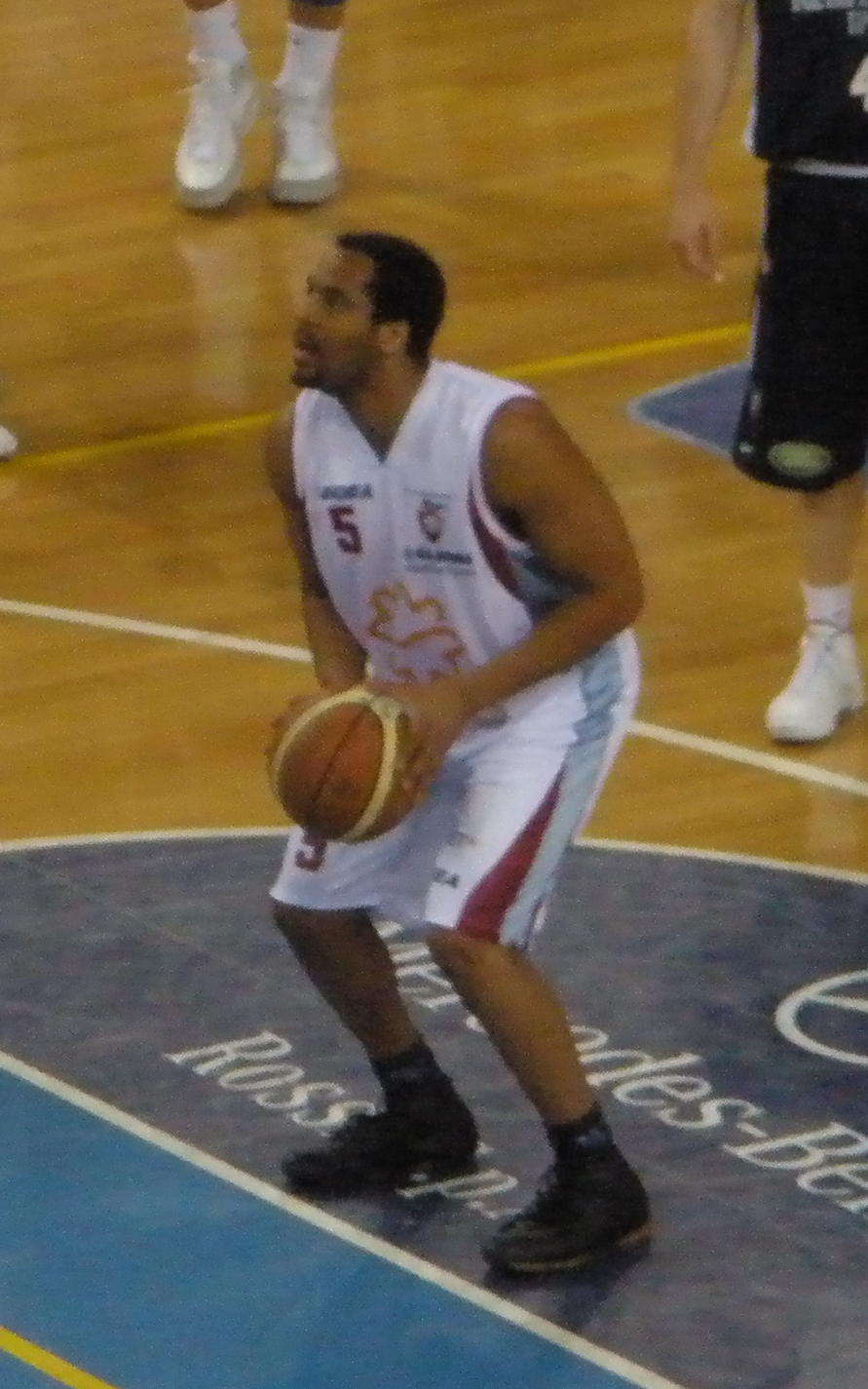

Personal information
- Born: February 12, 1980 (age 46) Pomona, California, U.S.
- Listed height: 6 ft 3 in (1.91 m)
- Listed weight: 190 lb (86 kg)

Career information
- High school: Pomona (Pomona, California)
- College: UC Irvine (1998–2002)
- NBA draft: 2002: undrafted
- Playing career: 2002–2012
- Position: Point guard

Career history
- 2002–2003: Mitteldeutscher
- 2003–2004: Czarni Słupsk
- 2004–2007: EnBW Ludwigsburg
- 2007–2008: Oostende
- 2008–2009: Solsonica Rieti
- 2009–2010: NGC Cantù
- 2010–2012: EnBW Ludwigsburg

Career highlights
- Basketball Bundesliga MVP (2007); 2× Big West Player of the Year (2001, 2002); 2× Honorable mention All-American (2001, 2002); 2× First-team All-Big West (2001, 2002); Second-team All-Big West (2000); Big West Freshman of the Year (1999)

Jerry L. Green (born February 12, 1980) is an American former basketball player. He is a 6 ft 3 in (1.91 m), 190-lb point guard. In 2006–07 Green was named the most valuable player (MVP) of Basketball Bundesliga, the top-tier men's professional basketball league in Germany, while playing for EnBW Ludwigsburg.

== Early life and college career ==
A native of Pomona, California, Green starred at Pomona High School from 1994 to 1998. He stayed in-state to play college basketball and decided to suit up for the UC Irvine Anteaters.

In 1998–99, Green's freshman season, he started all 26 games and averaged 12.8 points per contest. His scoring led the team, as did his 3.9 assists per game average and 38 total steals. Against Northern Arizona, Green had his best game of the season when he scored 24 points and grabbed 10 rebounds and six steals. The Anteaters finished with a 6–20 record. The following season, he increased his scoring average to 15.6 points per game, which led the team. At the Sooner Holiday Classic tournament, Green recorded 37 points, 12 rebounds and 10 assists in the two games, causing him to be named Big West Conference Player of the Week. Despite increased production by Green, UC Irvine only managed to improve to a 14–14 overall record.

In 2000–01, his junior year, there was a dramatic turnaround for the program as Green guided them to a school-record 25 wins (along with five losses). They won their first-ever conference championship and were invited to play in the 2001 National Invitation Tournament (NIT) where they lost in the opening round. Green averaged 19.0 points, 4.8 rebounds and 3.0 assists and was named the Big West Player of the Year. Along the way he was also named the conference player of the week four times and made two game-winning shots, one against Long Beach State and one against Boise State.

For the second year in a row, Green led the Anteaters to a conference championship in 2001–02 as well as a berth into the 2001 NIT. The Anteaters finished the season with a 21–11 record and Green repeated as the Big West Player of the Year. On November 20, 2001, he scored a career-high 41 points against Pepperdine, which is the third-highest single game output in school history. Through the 2011–12 season, Green is first in UC Irvine history with 1,993 career points, third in assists (412), second in steals (162), first in field goals made (672), first in free throws made (533), and first in consecutive games started (116).

== Professional career ==
After his junior season, Green became an early entry candidate for the 2001 NBA draft. Since he never hired an agent he did not forgo his NCAA eligibility. He eventually decided to return to school for his final season in hopes of increasing his draft stock. Ultimately this never paid off as no teams selected him in 2002.

Green has spent his entire professional career overseas. He has played in leagues in Belgium, Poland, Italy, and Germany. His most successful season was in 2006–07 after he was named the German Bundesliga's MVP. Despite never attaining his dream of playing the National Basketball Association, Green has kept a positive attitude about his situation: "I've gotten to experience different cultures and see new things...And the fans over here are crazy about basketball. They're almost as bad as soccer fans. We need a police escort to get from the bus to the arena."
