= St. Joseph Notre Dame High School =

Saint Joseph Notre Dame High School
- 1011 Chestnut St. Alameda, California 94501; United States

Information
- Type: Private, catholic, college preparatory school
- Religious affiliation: Catholic Church
- Established: 1881
- Founder: Sisters of Notre Dame de Namur
- Principal: Steve Kim
- Faculty: https://www.sjnd.org/about/faculty-staff-directory
- Grades: 9–12
- Colors: Blue and Orange
- Athletics: 21 athletic teams
- Athletics conference: California Interscholastic Federation
- Mascot: Pilot
- Nickname: the Pilots
- Accreditation: Western Association of Schools and Colleges
- Tuition: $25,495 (2025-26)
- Website: https://www.sjnd.org/

St. Joseph Notre Dame High School (SJND) is an independent Catholic high school in Alameda, California, United States.

== History ==
On March 27, 1881, at the invitation of Father William Gleeson, pastor of St. Anthony Church in Brooklyn, (East Oakland), Sister Marie de Sacre Coeur and the Sisters of Notre Dame de Namur founded an academy for girls, grades one through twelve, on a plot of land on the corner of Chestnut Street and San Jose Avenue in Alameda. Notre Dame Academy educated the young women of Alameda in grades one through twelve.

St. Joseph's was, at that time a "mission" church of St. Anthony's. In 1885, Saint Joseph's Parish was established, with Father Michael McNaboe as first pastor. In 1887 Fr. McNaboe requested the Sisters of Notre Dame de Namur to staff a boys elementary school.

In 1916 Father James Bernard Praught opened Saint Joseph Elementary School for the boys and girls of the parish. In 1922, a new co-ed grammar school was donated to the parish by Theresa Ettinger in memory of her husband, the late Victor Ettinger. When St. Joseph Elementary Grammar School was built, the original school buildings became part of the girls' high school, the Academy was renamed Notre Dame High School, a combined boarding and day school. In 1960, Monsignor Alvin P. Wagner demolished the antiquated girl's high school and built a new Saint Joseph's Notre Dame High School for girls. He erected the Gymnasium/Auditorium in 1964. The Sisters of Notre Dame de Namur stayed with the elementary and high schools until 1990.

Saint Joseph's Boys High School was founded in 1935 by Father Praught and Father Joseph Tetzlaff, provincial of the Brothers of Mary (Marianists) on the same city block as Saint Joseph's Church, Saint Joseph's Elementary School, and Notre Dame Girls High School. The Brothers of Mary (Marianists) departed in 1970.

Oakland Bishop John Stephen Cummins later invited the Congregation of the Sacred Hearts of Jesus and Mary. The new pastor, Patrick A. Goodwin, SSCC, decided to consolidate the two schools. These plans were completed in 1985 with the consolidation of the two single-sex schools into the coeducational St. Joseph Notre Dame High School. In 2007, the Congregation of the Sacred Hearts of Jesus and Mary decided to depart. Bishop Allen Vigneron returned the parish to the diocesan priests.

== Students ==
St. Joseph Notre Dame High School (SJND) has approximately 400 students enrolled in grades 9 through 12. SJND students come from over 27 public, independent, and Catholic schools. Approximately 50 percent of the students live in Alameda, 25 percent live in Oakland, and 25 percent live in neighboring East Bay communities. Student demographics reflect the Bay Area's cultural and ethnic diversity: African-American 13%, Asian 11%, Euro-American 29%, Filipino 12%, Latino 16%, Native American 1%, Multiracial/Other 17.7%.

== Curriculum ==
St. Joseph Notre Dame has a college preparatory curriculum. The school offers honors level courses in English, Math, Science, and Foreign Language and offers Advanced Placement courses in U.S. History, World History, English Literature and Composition, English Language, American Government and Politics, Calculus AB, Calculus BC, Statistics, Physics, Computer Science, Chemistry, Biology, Spanish Language, Environmental Science, and Art Studio.

The school offers project-based learning and innovative courses including Coding, Mandarin, and a Biomedical Sciences program with STEM curricula. Roughly ninety-nine percent of graduating seniors enroll in college, with many graduates earning merit-based scholarships and awards. SJND graduates are continually represented within the Ivy League, UC and Cal-State schools, as well as many other prestigious public and private universities across the country and abroad.

== Arts ==
SJND boasts a comprehensive arts program that includes visual, performing and literary arts offered in more than a dozen courses as well as a host of related student clubs. SJND student artists have been honored for their work in several areas. Each year since 2007, student photographers, illustrators, painters, and digital and mixed media artists have garnered honors in competitions including First Place and Best in Show honors in the Congressional Art Competition and other competitions and exhibitions.

The 2014 SJND musical In the Heights was among the top six high school musicals in California in the California State Musical Theater Honors competition.

For more than three decades the school's arts magazine Prisms has showcased student visual and literary works as well as original musical scores, earning first-place awards and other honors from The American Scholastic Press Association and National Council of Teachers of English.

== Athletics ==
St. Joseph Notre Dame offers interscholastic sports teams in baseball, basketball, cheerleading, crew, cross country, golf, lacrosse, soccer, softball, swimming, tennis, track and field, and volleyball. The school does not field a football team.

Despite being a small school, SJND has a reputation as a basketball state and national powerhouse, having won six California Interscholastic Federation (CIF) State Championships, a modern-era record for a Northern California school. Most notably, SJND won two Boys' Division I state titles, despite having a student body less than half the size of virtually all CIF Division I schools, defeating Fremont High School of Los Angeles in 1991 and Mater Dei High School of Santa Ana in 1992. SJND reached the Boys' CIF Division I Finals two more times in 1997 & 1998, losing to Crenshaw High School and Westchester High School, respectively. In 2004, SJND won the Boys' Division IV Championship against Verbum Dei High School of Los Angeles, 49–47. Most recently, SJND won the 2011 Boys' Division V State Championship against St. Bernard High School of Playa Del Rey, in 2014 against Renaissance Academy, and once again against St. Bernard in 2016. SJND also appeared in the 2009 Boys' Division V Finals, losing to Windward High School of Los Angeles, 69–53.

SJND boasts five former All-Americans, three of whom were named to the prestigious McDonald's All-American game. These include Cal, Bay Area, and NBA Hall-of-Fame inductee, two-time California High School Player of the Year, and the recipient of the Naismith Award and the National High School Player of the Year by USA Today, Jason Kidd ('92); Villanova alum Calvin Byrd ('89); and UCLA alum and Slam Magazine's High School Diary featured columnist, Ray Young ('98). Adrian Ealy ('92) and Stanford graduate, Justin Davis ('99) were also recipients of All-American honors. The school has a long list of players who went on to compete at the collegiate level. Among this list are the alums who went on to compete at the Division I level. This includes: Cameron Ba ('18-UCD); Kevin Butler ('00-UCR); Hondre Brewer ('98-USF); Blandon Ferguson ('99-Illinois); Jon Gordon ('96-SMC); Alex Harris ('04-UCSB); Allen Hester ('05-Ohio); Renee Jacques ('98-CSUS); Brandon Keane ('11-N.CO); Adrian McCullough ('96-UNR); Nate Murase ('98-CSUS); Jade' Smith ('17-Pepp); Miles Tarver (UoM); David Victor ('93-UNR/CSUS); Julian Vaughns ('19-CSUS); Ari Warmerdam ('02-UCD); Temidayo Yussuf ('14-LBSU). Pilots Rashawn Fulcher ('97) and Benjamin Ortner ('01) were also Division II National Champions for Metropolitan State of Denver.

The basketball program has also included two of the winningest and most revered California coaches of all-time in the late Frank LaPorte (735 wins) and Don Lippi (914 wins). Frank LaPorte is one of just two Northern California coaches to be named head coach of the McDonald's All-American game ('92), while Don Lippi has been the recipient of multiple regional and statewide honors. Lippi retired in 2023 as the all-time winningest high school coach in Northern California and currently ranks 4th in California state history.

In men's tennis, St. Joseph Notre Dame has won four individual BSAL Singles Championships, winning in 2001, 2006, 2007, and 2008. The men's volleyball team enjoyed similar success as they captured three successive BSAL titles from 2006 to 2008. The women's volleyball team has enjoyed recent success as they captured the NCS title in 2024.

SJND's cross-country team has enjoyed great success as well, earning back to back state championships in 2012 and 2013. During the 2011 season, the team won the BSAL title and in route to breaking St. Mary's (Berkeley) decade-long winning streak. The Pilots also won the NCS Division V title, with a record-setting time by Gabe Arias-Sheridan, and placed 3rd at State. Later that year, Nick Ratto also finished 3rd statewide in the 800m race. In 2015 and 2016, SJND was led by All-American runner, Cooper Teare, as the Pilots went on to win back to back Division V State Championships. Teare finished with leading times of 15:07 and 14:58 at State, respectively. Teare added to his individual accolades by winning the California All-State 3200 in 2016 and the Indoor National Titles for the 5k and 1-Mile in 2017. On April 14, 2017, Cooper ran a 4:00.16 mile race, which at that time, was the 10th fastest mile ever run by a male high-school student-athlete. Alumni who have gone on to compete at the NCAA Division 1 level include: Alexander Mason ('98 Fresno State); Ian Mason ('00 Fresno State); Neal Rodrigues ('06 Saint Louis University); Nicholas Ratto ('12 UC Davis); Kimberly Avalos ('13 Saint Mary's College); Louis Rodrigues ('13 Seattle University); Gabriel Arias-Sheridan ('14 Saint Mary's College); Michael Murphy ('15 University of Portland); Daniel Ratto ('16 Saint Mary's College); Kiera Marshal ('17 Washington); Cooper Teare ('17 Oregon).

St. Joseph Notre Dame's mascot is the Pilot, in honor of the city's former Naval Air Station.

== Notable alumni ==
- Dennis Breedlove, botanist and herbarium curator
- Mark Curry, comedian/actor, star of the popular 1990s television show Hangin' with Mr. Cooper
- Alex Harris, 3rd all-time leading scorer at UCSB and was also named an AP Honorable Mention All-American following his senior season
- Marielle Heller, film director
- Jason Kidd, former professional basketball player and head coach of the Dallas Mavericks. Won two championships: one as a player with the Mavericks in 2011 and one as an assistant for the Los Angeles Lakers in 2020
- Damian Lillard, NBA point guard
- Joe Nelson, Florida Marlins pitcher
- Don Perata, teacher and politician
- Barry Reed, novelist, author of The Verdict later a movie starring Paul Newman
- Cooper Teare, competitive distance runner
