= Will C. Wood High School =

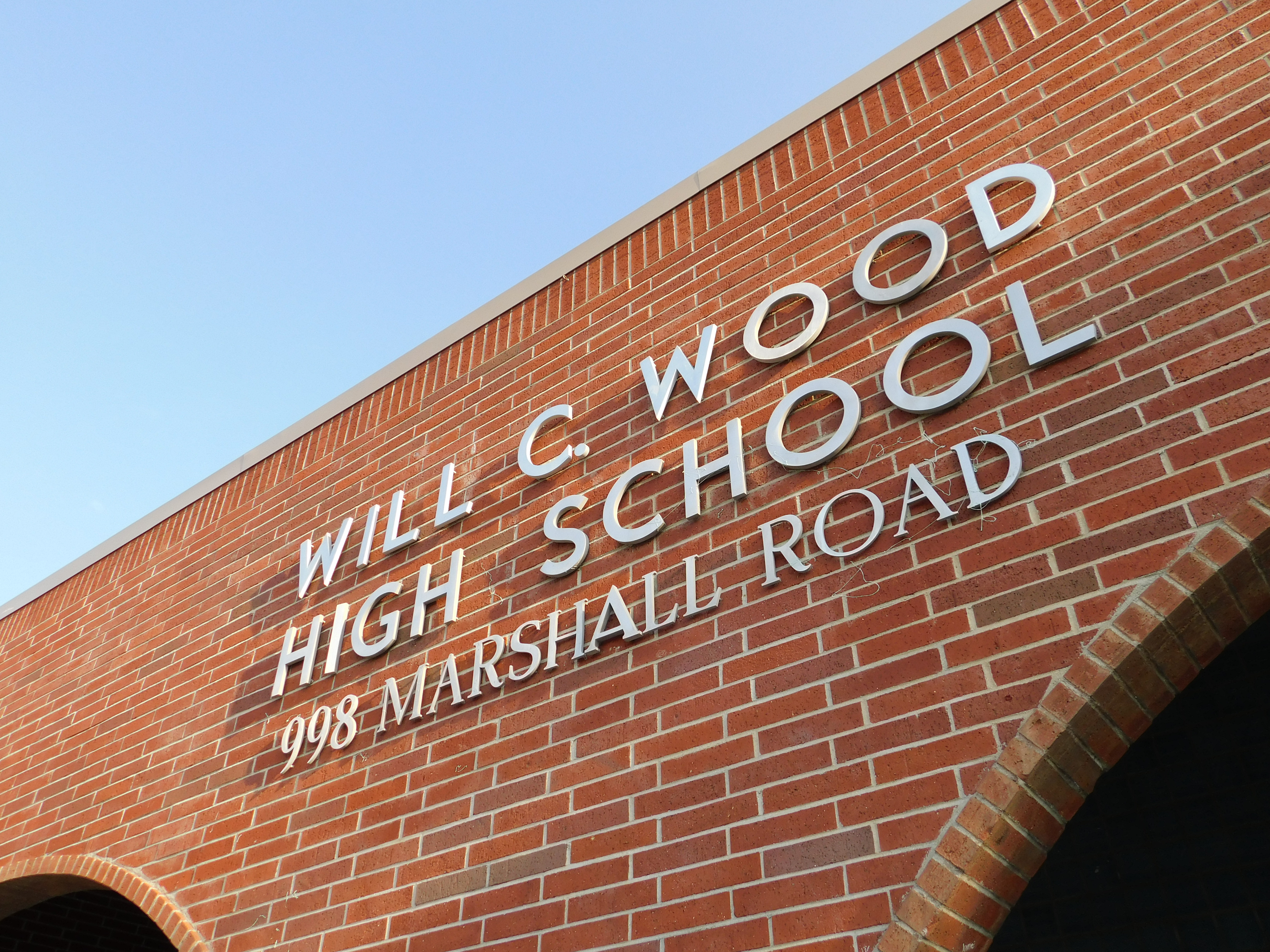
- Will C Wood's iconic "front arches" that bears the school's name and address

Location
- 998 Marshall Rd., Vacaville, California; 38.3469°N 121.9783°W

Information
- Type: High School
- Opened: 1969
- School district: Vacaville Unified School District
- Principal: Charleston Brown
- Staff: 80.20 (FTE)
- Grades: 9th-12th
- Enrollment: 1,681 (2023-2024)
- Student to teacher ratio: 20.96
- Colors: Royal blue and gold
- Nickname: "Wood"
- Team name: Wildcats
- Communities served: The Wildcat Family, Kat Kartel
- Feeder schools: Vaca Peña Middle School
- Website: wcw.vacavilleusd.org

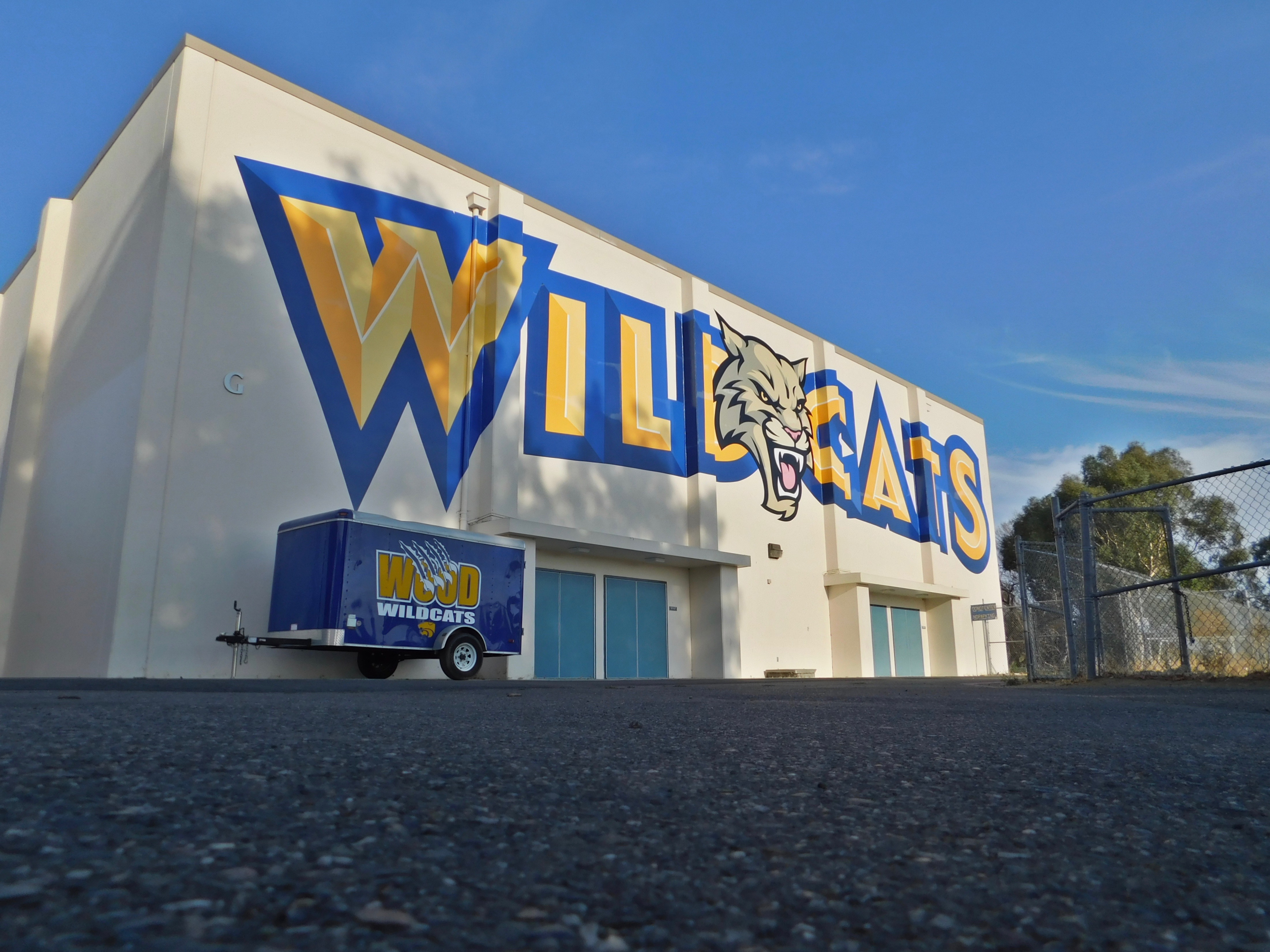
A view of the Frank Molina Gymnasium, where the "Wildcats" logo can be seen from miles away

Will C. Wood High School is a high school in the Vacaville Unified School District located in Vacaville, California, serving the south side of the city and the unincorporated community of Elmira. First opening its doors in September 1969, it was a middle school until the 1988–1989 school year. That was when the conversion to a high school began and had its first graduating class in 1992. The school has seen two major improvement projects, based on funding from Measure V passed in 2003, improving physical education facilities and adding the science wing, and Measure A passed in 2014, which finally gave Will C. Wood their own stadium.

== School history ==
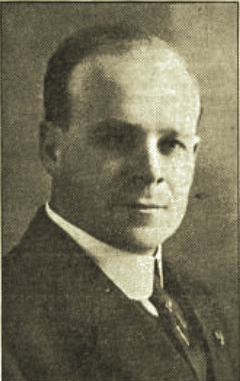
Will C. Wood (1918)

Will C. Wood first opened its doors in September 1969. At that time it was planned to be Vacaville's second comprehensive high school. Growth was not as fast as anticipated and plans were modified. From 1969 to 1973 Will C. Wood was a satellite campus for Vacaville High School. Ninth and tenth grades for science and math and all classes for ninth graders were two combinations that were used. In the fall of 1974, Wood became a junior high school (grades 7 - 9) servicing the south side of Vacaville while Willis Jepson Junior High School serviced the north side of Vacaville. Wood remained in this format until the 1988–1989 school year.

A new intermediate school, Vaca Pena Middle School, was built on the south side of Vacaville. Seventh graders went to Vaca Pena rather than to Wood. In 1988 Wood began its transition into a four-year high school. That year Wood had 8th, 9th, and 10th graders. Construction was started to complete Wood as a high school. A new gymnasium, locker room, classroom wing, office complex, cafeteria, and theater were added. Each year a new class was added. The 1991–1992 school year was the first year that Will C. Wood was a complete four year high school. However, the facility was never completed. The class of 1992 was its first graduating class. In 2012 Will C Wood celebrated its first 20 years of graduates.

== Principals ==
History of Principals at Will C Wood High School
Name:	Years served:	Notes:
Nancy Klees	1969-1977	First Serving Principal of Will C Wood High School
Frank Molina	1977-1991	Oversaw the conversion of Wood into a Middle school, Gymnasium named after him
Mike Donnoe	1991-1994	Principal of the first graduating class of Will C Wood High School
Garlon Prewitt	1994-1995	Shortest Serving Principal in School History
Enriqueta Newland	1995-2005	Promoted Vacaville's bond measure Measure V in 2003 for school improvements and expansion
Chris Strong	2006-2011	Oversaw the building and opening of many Measure V projects, including the opening of the state-of-the-art Science wing. Father of Carson Strong.
Cliff De Graw	2011-2016	Promoted the passage of Vacaville's Measure A, acquired funding of the school's much-sought-after stadium
Adam Rich	2016–2022	Principal of first graduating class on Will C Wood's campus, frontman of band Pressure 4-5
Charleston Brown	2022–present	Most recent principal in school history

== Notable alumni ==
- Jarrett Bush (Class of 2002, Super Bowl XLV Champion with the Green Bay Packers)
- Jermaine Dye (Class of 1992, 2005 World Series MVP with the Chicago White Sox)
- Xzavie Jackson (transferred to Wichita Heights High School in Kansas, Class of 2003, IFL defensive end)
- Jay Nagle (Class of 2018, professional basketball player for Tigers Tübingen)
- Dominique Pennix (Class of 2003, college basketball point guard for | California State University at Stanislaus Warriors| https://warriorathletics.com/sports/mens-basketball/roster/dominique-pennix/4565
- Carson Strong (Class of 2018 quarterback for the Nevada Wolf Pack)
