= Lloyd McMillian =

American basketball player

Personal information
- Born: Brooklyn, New York, U.S.
- Listed height: 6 ft 5 in (1.96 m)
- Listed weight: 185 lb (84 kg)

Career information
- High school: Storm King School (Cornwall-on-Hudson, New York)
- College: Loyola Marymount (1972–1975); Long Beach State (1976–1977)
- NBA draft: 1977: 3rd round, 54th overall pick
- Drafted by: New York Knicks
- Position: Small forward

Career highlights
- PCAA Player of the Year (1977); First-team All-PCAA (1977)
- Stats at Basketball Reference

Lloyd McMillian is an American former basketball player. He played college basketball for the Loyola Marymount Lions and Long Beach State 49ers. McMillian was the Pacific Coast Athletic Association (PCAA) Player of the Year with the 49ers in 1977. He was selected by the New York Knicks in the third round of the 1977 NBA draft.

== Playing career ==
McMillian was born to parents who later divorced and raised by his mother in the Bedford–Stuyvesant neighborhood of Brooklyn, New York. His older brother, Jim McMillian, became a professional basketball player.

McMillian began playing basketball in junior high school and practiced on the playgrounds of New York City. His older brother arranged for him to attend Storm King School in upstate New York and funded his education.

McMillian started his college basketball career with the Loyola Marymount Lions where he played at the guard, small forward and center positions. He transferred to the Long Beach State 49ers and had to sit out the 1975–76 season as a transfer student. McMillian became eligible to play during the 1976–77 season. Playing as a small forward for the 49ers, he averaged 15.7 points per game and was selected as the PCAA Player of the Year in 1977.

McMillian was selected by the New York Knicks in the third round of the 1977 NBA draft. He was invited to the Knicks' rookie camp in 1977, and was one of six players there to receive an invite to training camp. McMillian was unable to agree on contractual terms and instead played in France during the 1977–78 season.

McMillian played in a Long Beach State alumni game in 1985.
