= Faron Hand =

American basketball player

Personal information
- Born: September 11, 1973 (age 53) Philadelphia, Pennsylvania, U.S.
- Listed height: 6 ft 7 in (2.01 m)

Career information
- High school: Franklin Learning Center (Philadelphia, Pennsylvania)
- College: Dixie (1992–1994); Nevada (1994–1997)
- NBA draft: 1997: undrafted
- Position: Center / power forward

Career history
- 2005–2006: NH Ostrava
- 2007: Nelson Giants

Career highlights
- Big West Player of the Year (1997); First-team All-Big West (1997); Big West tournament MVP (1997)

Faron Demetrius Hand (born September 11, 1973) is an American former professional basketball player. Nicknamed "Meatball", he played college basketball for the Nevada Wolf Pack from 1994 to 1997. Hand was selected as the Big West Conference Player of the Year in 1997. He played professionally overseas for 10 years.

== Basketball career ==
Hand received his nickname, "Meatball", when his uncle saw him for the first time as a baby. His mother, Jacqueline Hand Thomas, worked as a security guard in a Philadelphia high school. Hand was raised in Philadelphia and attended Franklin Learning Center. Hand was recruited by the UNLV Runnin' Rebels but did not qualify academically. UNLV suggested that he attended nearby Dixie College (now Utah Tech University) and Hand started two seasons for the Dixie Rebels. UNLV cooled on their recruitment of Hand and he was instead recruited by the Nevada Wolf Pack where he transferred in 1994.

Hand was listed as 6 ft 7 in (2.01 m) but stood only 6 ft 5 in (1.96 m). He specialised as a post player. Hand appeared in five games to start the 1995–96 season before he received a medical redshirt to recover from knee surgery. He was selected as the Big West Conference Player of the Year in 1997. Hand's 19.4 points per game were third-highest in the conference while his 8.1 rebounds were second-highest during the 1996–97 season.

Hand played professionally overseas for 10 years. He played for the Nelson Giants of the New Zealand National Basketball League in 2007.

== Post-playing career ==
After his playing career ended, Hand worked as a youth counselor and mental health professional. He has coached high school basketball and track in Philadelphia.

Hand was inducted into the University of Nevada Athletics Hall of Fame in 2022.
