= Pressure 4-5 =

American rock band

- Pressure 4-5 in 2001

Background information
- Origin: Santa Barbara, California, U.S.
- Genres: Alternative rock; post-grunge; alternative metal; nu metal
- Years active: 1998–2003
- Label: DreamWorks
- Members: Adam Rich; Mark Barry; Joe Schmidt; Jon Miller; Andy Bogert
- Past members: Lyle McKeany; Tom Schmidt; Jake Fowler

Pressure 4-5 was an American rock band formed in Santa Barbara, California in 1998. The band released one studio album, Burning the Process, in October 2001 and toured into the following year. They soon after broke up upon many of the band members leaving for lifestyles not relating to music.

Although often categorized under the alternative and nu metal genres popular at the time, Pressure 4–5, not wanting to be pigeonholed with current trends, insisted they were not metal but rather a "heavy rock band with introspective and somewhat intelligent lyrics" and "not chanting the next rap rock tech phrases in our songs."

== Band history ==
Formed in January 1998 by vocalist Adam Rich (born 1979) and guitarist Mark Barry, Pressure 4-5 started simply enough, as two college friends forming a band together. Things quickly picked up when another friend from college, Lyle McKeany (born 1977), joined the group as bassist. Joe Schmidt (born 1981) later joined the band as DJ before switching to rhythm guitar. Jake Fowler joined after seeing an ad at a local drum shop; Schmidt later recruited his brother, Tom, to replace Fowler.

The band's moniker comes from Joe Schmidt's unwillingness to be the group's DJ. He rarely came for practices with the band, which left the remaining members wondering if they would have 4 or 5 members, hence the name "Pressure 4-5."

In 1999, the band released an independent EP, entitled Antechnology. They continued performing throughout California and, with the help of music websites and fanzines, quickly built a following. After a warm welcoming from the rock community and a large outpouring of support, Pressure 4-5 was quickly signed to DreamWorks Records in 2000, where they released their only full-length album, Burning the Process, in autumn the following year. Amidst the nu metal craze, 2001 would prove to be Pressure 4-5's most successful year; they acquired a spot on the Second Stage of Ozzfest 2001 before touring with groups like Dredg, The Used, and Lit. A live October performance in Colorado would also be taped for an MTV special in November. However, of the band's most memorable concert experiences include a sold-out show with Alien Ant Farm at WWF New York following the September 11 terrorist attacks. Burning the Process went on to sell 80,000 copies.

Unfortunately, the band's success was short-lived after the promotion of two singles, "Beat The World," with a music video directed by Marc Webb, and "Melt Me Down." The former performed quite well on modern rock mainstays such as MTV2 during 2001, and Pressure 4-5 started working on new material the following year with new blue graphics draping their website. By spring, their headlining spot on the MTV2 Presents Tour with Apex Theory and Lostprophets also allowed the band to preview their new music to audiences. Further exposure was gained through radio shows with the likes of Blink-182 and 311. After finishing up touring in December, Pressure 4-5 was scheduled to enter the studio to record some new songs in January 2003; however, Tom Schmidt and Lyle McKeany quit. Schmidt wanted to return to Santa Barbara so he could enroll for a cooking school in the Tuscany area. The band would later be dropped from their record label. A few demos made with replacement musicians were recorded but never released, and Pressure 4-5 eventually disbanded in July 2003.

The breakup was confirmed on the band's website by guitarist Mark Barry, he wrote: "I know there have been a lot of rumors flying around this message board for the last few months. Unfortunately about 90% of them are true, and Pressure 4-5 is no more. After our last show here in Santa Barbara, Adam decided to call it quits to pursue other goals, and the rest of us have decided to do the same. I personally want everyone to know how much I appreciate all the support over the last five years."

Joe Schmidt later joined Primal Tribe with former Implant frontman Ben Ofstead and bassist Rob Cantrell. Vocalist Adam Rich recently served as principal of Will C. Wood High School in Vacaville, California from 2016 to 2022.

In 2013, bassist Lyle McKeany explained on his personal website how the band's contract with DreamWorks and EMI had put the band over a million dollars in debt, and recalled the moment when band management informed them they'd have to sell over a million albums to recoup that money.

"We recorded our album at NRG studios, which cost roughly $350,000. We also shot our video at Universal Studios, which cost roughly $250,000. Let('s) do the math: $500,000 advance (we had a 5-piece band) + $350,000 recording + $250,000 video = $1,150,000. And we had not even hit the road yet!"

== Band members ==
Final line-up

- Adam Rich – lead vocals (1998–2003)
- Joe Schmidt – rhythm guitar (1998–2003), turntables (1998)
- Mark Barry – lead guitar (1998–2003)
- John Miller – bass guitar (2003)
- Andrew Bogert – drums (2003)

Previous members

- Lyle McKeany – bass guitar, backing vocals (1998–2003)
- Jake Fowler – drums (1998-1999)
- Tom Schmidt - drums (1999–2003)

== Discography ==
Studio albums

- Burning the Process (2001)

EPs

- Antechnology (1999)
