= Scott Cutley =

American basketball player

Cal State Northridge Matadors
- Title: Assistant coach
- League: Big West Conference

Personal information
- Born: June 6, 1985 (age 41)
- Listed height: 6 ft 5 in (1.96 m)
- Listed weight: 235 lb (107 kg)

Career information
- High school: Westchester (Los Angeles, California)
- College: Kent State (2003–2005); Cal State Fullerton (2006–2008)
- NBA draft: 2008: undrafted
- Position: Forward
- Coaching career: 2022–present

Career history

Playing
- 2009–2010: Entrerriano
- 2010–2011: Boca Juniors

Coaching
- 2022–2023: Cal State San Bernardino (assistant)
- 2023–present: Cal State Northridge (assistant)

Career highlights
- Big West co-Player of the Year (2008); 2× First-team All-Big West (2007, 2008)

Scott Adam Cutley (born June 6, 1985) is an American college basketball coach and former professional player who is an assistant coach for the Cal State Northridge men's basketball team. He played college basketball for the Kent State Golden Flashes and Cal State Fullerton Titans. Cutley was selected as the Big West co-Player of the Year with the Titans in 2008. He played professionally in South America.

Cutley returned to the Titans as a graduate assistant during the 2021–22 season. He joined the Cal State San Bernardino Coyotes as an assistant coach in 2022. Cutley was appointed as an assistant coach for the Cal State Northridge Matadors in 2023.

== Early life ==
Cutley played basketball at Westchester High School in Los Angeles, California, where he played alongside teammates Trevor Ariza and Bobby Brown. He committed to play college basketball for the Kent State Golden Flashes after being recruited by assistant coach Rob Murphy.

== College playing career ==
Cutley played for two seasons at Kent State. He decided to transfer to the Cal State Fullerton Titans to play alongside his childhood friend, Bobby Brown.

Cutley had to sit out the 2005–06 season as a redshirt. He became eligible for the 2006–07 season and was named as team captain. Cutley helped the Titans to a 20–10 record and he was selected to the All-Big West Conference first-team in 2007. He led the Titans to a 24–9 record during his senior season in 2007–08 and was selected as the Big West co-Player of the Year. Cutley averaged 15.1 points and 8.4 rebounds per game during his career with the Titans.

== Professional playing career ==
Cutley played professionally for 13 seasons in South America. He won championships in Argentina and Paraguay, and was selected as the league's most valuable player in Chile.

== Coaching career ==
On November 2, 2021, Cutley returned to Cal State Fullerton as a graduate assistant. He joined Andy Newman's coaching staff for the Cal State San Bernardino Coyotes during the 2022–23 season; Newman had served as an assistant coach for the Titans during Cutley's playing career. Cutley followed Newman to the Cal State Northridge Matadors as an assistant coach when Newman was appointed as head coach for the 2023–24 season.
