= UC Santa Barbara Gauchos men's basketball =

College men's basketball team representing the University of California, Santa Barbara

2026–27 UC Santa Barbara Gauchos men's basketball team
- University: University of California, Santa Barbara
- Head coach: Joe Pasternack (10th season)
- Location: Santa Barbara, California
- Arena: UC Santa Barbara Events Center (capacity: 5,600)
- Conference: Big West Conference (WCC in 2027–28)
- Nickname: Gauchos
- Colors: Blue and gold

NCAA Division I tournament Elite Eight
- 1961*
Other NCAA Division I tournament results
Sweet Sixteen	1961*
Appearances	1961*, 1963*, 1988, 1990, 2002, 2010, 2011, 2021, 2023

Conference tournament champions
- 2002, 2010, 2011, 2021, 2023

Conference regular-season champions
- 1999, 2003, 2008, 2010, 2021, 2023

Uniforms
Home	Away	Alternate
- * at Division II level

The UC Santa Barbara Gauchos men's basketball team is the basketball team that represents University of California, Santa Barbara in Santa Barbara, California, United States. The school's team competes in the Big West Conference. The current head coach is Joe Pasternack. The Gauchos have appeared seven times in the NCAA tournament, most recently in 2023.

== The Blue–Green Rivalry ==
The main rival of the UC Santa Barbara Gauchos men's basketball team is the Cal Poly Mustangs men's basketball team. The rivalry is a part of the larger Blue–Green Rivalry, which encompasses all sports from the two schools.

== Yearly records ==
Record table
Season	Coach	Overall	Conference	Standing	Postseason
Arthur Gallon (West Coast Athletic Conference) (1963–1966)
1963–64	UC Santa Barbara	18–11			
1964–65	UC Santa Barbara	12–14	7–7	5th	
1965–66	UC Santa Barbara	10–16	5–9	6th	
Arthur Gallon:		40–41 (.494)	12–18 (.400)		
Ralph Barkey (West Coast Athletic Conference) (1966–1969)
1966–67	UC Santa Barbara	10–16	6–8	5th	
1967–68	UC Santa Barbara	9–17	3–11	T–6th	
1968–69	UC Santa Barbara	17–9	8–6	4th	
Ralph Barkey (Pacific Coast Athletic Conference) (1969–1974)
1969–70	UC Santa Barbara	12–14	6–4	T–2nd	
1970–71	UC Santa Barbara	20–6	8–2	2nd	
1971–72	UC Santa Barbara	17–9	5–7	T–3rd	
1972–73	UC Santa Barbara	17–9	8–4	2nd	
1973–74	UC Santa Barbara	16–10	7–5	3rd	
Ralph Barkey (Independent) (1974–1976)
1974–75	UC Santa Barbara	18–8			
1975–76	UC Santa Barbara	17–9			
Ralph Barkey (Pacific Coast Athletic Conference) (1976–1978)
1976–77	UC Santa Barbara	8–18	3–9	6th	
1977–78	UC Santa Barbara	8–19	3–11	7th	
Ralph Barkey:		169–144 (.540)	57–67 (.460)		
Ed DeLacy (Pacific Coast Athletic Conference) (1978–1983)
1978–79	UC Santa Barbara	12–15	6–8	6th	
1979–80	UC Santa Barbara	11–16	5–9	6th	
1980–81	UC Santa Barbara	11–16	5–9	T–5th	
1981–82	UC Santa Barbara	10–16	5–6	6th	
1982–83	UC Santa Barbara	7–20	1–15	9th	
Ed DeLacy:		51–83 (.381)	22–47 (.319)		
Jerry Pimm (Pacific Coast Athletic Conference) (1983–1988)
1983–84	UC Santa Barbara	10–17	5–13	9th	
1984–85	UC Santa Barbara	12–16	8–10	6th	
1985–86	UC Santa Barbara	12–15	7–11	9th	
1986–87	UC Santa Barbara	16–12	10–8	T–2nd	
1987–88	UC Santa Barbara	22–8	13–5		NCAA first round
Jerry Pimm (Big West Conference) (1988–1998)
1988–89	UC Santa Barbara	21–9	11–7	3rd	NIT first round
1989–90	UC Santa Barbara	21–9	13–5	3rd	NCAA second round
1990–91	UC Santa Barbara	14–15	8–10	T–4th	
1991–92	UC Santa Barbara	20–9	13–5	2nd	NIT first round
1992–93	UC Santa Barbara	18–11	10–8	T–5th	NIT first round
1993–94	UC Santa Barbara	13–17	9–9	7th	
1994–95	UC Santa Barbara	13–14	8–10	6th	
1995–96	UC Santa Barbara	11–15	8–10	7th	
1996–97	UC Santa Barbara	12–15	7–9	3rd West	
1997–98	UC Santa Barbara	7–19	4–12	6th West	
Jerry Pimm:		222–201(.525)	91–85 (.517)		
Bob Williams (Big West Conference) (1998–2017)
1998–99	UC Santa Barbara	15–13	12–4	1st West	
1999–2000	UC Santa Barbara	14–14	10–6	2nd West	
2000–01	UC Santa Barbara	13–15	9–7	4th	
2001–02	UC Santa Barbara	20–11	11–7	3rd	NCAA first round
2002–03	UC Santa Barbara	18–14	14–4	1st	NIT first round
2003–04	UC Santa Barbara	16–12	10–8	3rd	
2004–05	UC Santa Barbara	11–18	7–11	6th	
2005–06	UC Santa Barbara	15–14	6–8	5th	
2006–07	UC Santa Barbara	18–11	9–5	2nd	
2007–08	UC Santa Barbara	23–9	12–4	T–1st	NIT first round
2008–09	UC Santa Barbara	16–15	8–8	T–4th	
2009–10	UC Santa Barbara	20–10	12–4	T–1st	NCAA first round
2010–11	UC Santa Barbara	18–14	8–8	T–4th	NCAA first round
2011–12	UC Santa Barbara	20–11	12–4	T–2nd	NIT first round
2012–13	UC Santa Barbara	11–20	7–11	7th	
2013–14	UC Santa Barbara	21–9	12–4	2nd	
2014–15	UC Santa Barbara	19–14	11–5	T–2nd	CBI first round
2015–16	UC Santa Barbara	19–14	11–5	4th	Vegas 16 semifinals
2016–17	UC Santa Barbara	6–22	4–12	9th	
Bob Williams:		313–260 (.546)	185–125 (.597)		
Joe Pasternack (Big West Conference) (2017–present)
2017–18	UC Santa Barbara	23–9	11–5	T–2nd	
2018–19	UC Santa Barbara	22–10	10–6	T–2nd	
2019–20	UC Santa Barbara	21–10	10–6	T–2nd	
2020–21	UC Santa Barbara	22–5	13–3	1st	NCAA First Round
2021–22	UC Santa Barbara	17–11	8–5	5th	
2022–23	UC Santa Barbara	27–8	15–5	T-1st	NCAA First Round
2023–24	UC Santa Barbara	16–15	9–11	T-7th	
2024–25	UC Santa Barbara	21–13	11–9	5th	
2025–26	UC Santa Barbara	18–14	11–9	T-5th	
Joe Pasternack:		187–95 (.663)	95–59 (.617)		
Total:		959–815 (.541)			
National champion Postseason invitational champion Conference regular season champion Conference regular season and conference tournament champion Division regular season champion Division regular season and conference tournament champion Conference tournament champion

== Postseason ==
=== NCAA Division I ===
The Gauchos have appeared in seven NCAA tournaments. Their combined record is 1–7.

Year	Seed	Round	Opponent	Result
1988	#10	First Round	#7 Maryland	L 82–92
1990	#9	First Round; Second Round	#8 Houston #1 Michigan State	W 70–66; L 58–62
2002	#14	First Round	#3 Arizona	L 81–86
2010	#15	First Round	#2 Ohio State	L 51–68
2011	#15	First Round	#2 Florida	L 51–79
2021	#12	First Round	#5 Creighton	L 62–63
2023	#14	First Round	#3 Baylor	L 56–74

=== NCAA Division II ===
The Gauchos appeared in two NCAA tournaments. Their combined record was 3–2.

Year	Round	Opponent	Result
1961	Regional Semifinals; Regional Finals; Elite Eight	Nevada; Long Beach State; South Dakota State	W 78–57; W 58–54; L 65–79
1963	Regional Semifinals; Regional Third Place	Fresno State; San Francisco State	L 60–68; W 58–56

=== NIT results ===
The Gauchos have appeared in five National Invitation Tournaments (NIT). Their combined record is 0–5.

Year	Round	Opponent	Result
1989	First Round	Wichita State	L 62–70
1992	First Round	Arizona State	L 65–71
1993	First Round	Pepperdine	L 50–53
2003	First Round	San Diego State	L 62–67
2008	First Round	Mississippi	L 68–83

=== Vegas 16 results ===
The Gauchos appeared in the first and only Vegas 16 tournament held. Their record was 1–1.

Year	Round	Opponent	Result
2016	Quarterfinals; Semifinals	Northern Illinois; Old Dominion	W 70–63; L 49–64

=== CBI results ===
The Gauchos have appeared in the College Basketball Invitational (CBI) one time. Their record is 0–1.

Year	Round	Opponent	Result
2015	First Round	Oral Roberts	L 87–91

=== CIT results ===
The Gauchos have appeared in one CollegeInsider.com Postseason Tournament (CIT). Their combined record is 0–1.

Year	Round	Opponent	Result
2012	First Round	Idaho	L 83–86

=== NAIA tournament results ===
The Gauchos have appeared in the NAIA Tournament one time. Their record is 3–2.

Year	Round	Opponent	Result
1941	First Round; Second Round; Quarterfinals; Semifinals; National 3rd Place Game	Wayne State; Bemidji State; Appalachian State; Murray State; West Texas State	W 32–26; W 31–29; W 36–29; L 33–35; L 35–46

== Retired numbers ==
The Gauchos have only retired one number in program history, that of guard Brian Shaw.

UC Santa Barbara Gauchos retired numbers
No.	Player	Pos.	Career	Ref.
22	Brian Shaw	PG / SG	1986–1988	

== Gauchos in the NBA ==
- Richard Anderson: San Diego Clippers, Denver Nuggets, Houston Rockets, Portland Trail Blazers, Charlotte Hornets, 1982–1990
- Don Ford: Los Angeles Lakers, Cleveland Cavaliers, 1975–1982
- Conner Henry: Houston Rockets, Boston Celtics, Milwaukee Bucks, Sacramento Kings, 1986–1988
- Orlando Johnson: Indiana Pacers, Sacramento Kings, Phoenix Suns, New Orleans Pelicans, 2012–2016
- JaQuori McLaughlin: Dallas Mavericks, 2021–2022
- Ajay Mitchell: Oklahoma City Thunder, 2024–present
- Miles Norris: Boston Celtics, 2025
- James Nunnally: Atlanta Hawks, Philadelphia 76ers, Houston Rockets, 2014–2019
- Brian Shaw: Boston Celtics, Miami Heat, Orlando Magic, Golden State Warriors, Philadelphia 76ers, Portland Trail Blazers, Los Angeles Lakers, 1988–2003
- John Tschogl: Atlanta Hawks, Philadelphia 76ers, 1972–1975
- Gabe Vincent: Miami Heat, Los Angeles Lakers, Atlanta Hawks, 2020–present
- Alan Williams: Phoenix Suns, Brooklyn Nets, 2015–2019

== Gauchos in international basketball ==
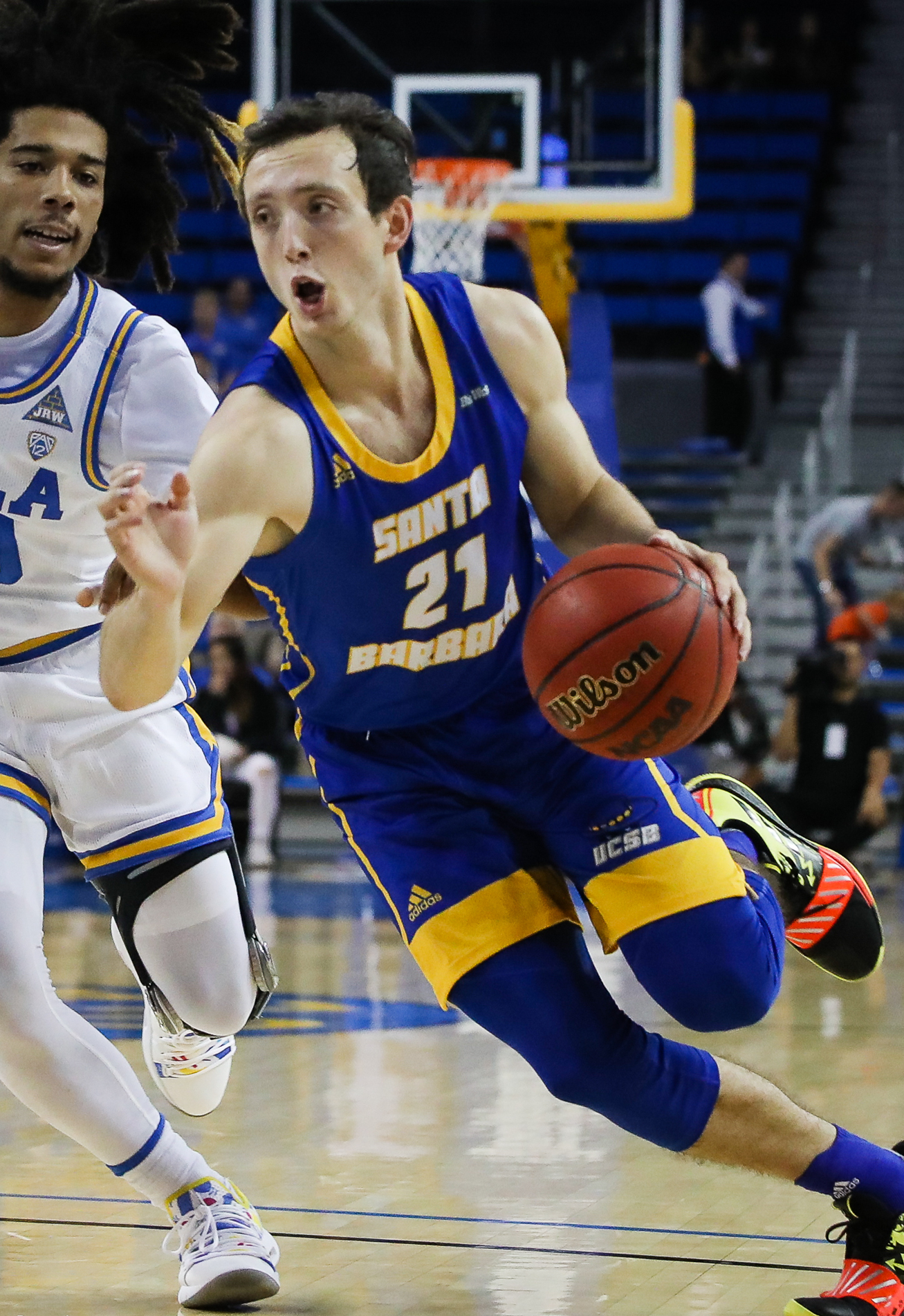
Max Heidegger

- Michael Bryson (2012–2016)
- Lucius Davis (1988–1992)
- Scott Fisher (1982–1986)
- Matt Freeman (2019–2020)
- Branduinn Fullove (2000–2004)
- Tom Garlepp (2002–2020)
- Alex Harris (2004–2008)
- Max Heidegger (2016–2020)
- Zack Moore (2018–2019)
- Jay Nagle (2018–2022)
- James Nunnally (2008–2012)
- Greg Somogyi (2008–2012)
