= City Slam =

- Genre: Sport
- Presented by: Dee Brown
- Judges: Blake Shelton
- Country of origin: United States
- Original language: English

Original release
- Network: ESPN
- Release: 28 July 2005 – 14 August 2008

City Slam (also known as ESPN City Slam) was an ESPN television series that premiered in 2005. The show was a basketball competition featuring streetball players competing in both a slam dunk and three-point shooting contest, similar to the annual NBA All-Star Weekend. The show was hosted by Dee Brown, himself a 1991 NBA slam Dunk Champion.

== 2008 City Slam ==
City Slam returned to ESPN in 2008. The event took place in Chicago on August 9, 2008 and aired on ESPN August 14, 2008. Dee Brown returned as host.

Contestants: Above and Beyond, Air Bama, Elevator, Exile, Fabian Gresier, Guy Dupuy, Golden Child, High Rizer, JustFly, KD, Special FX, Tdub, Tfly, and Werm.
