= The Explosion discography =

The discography for the American rock band The Explosion.

== Studio albums ==
- Flash Flash Flash (July 18, 2000) Jade Tree Records
- Black Tape (October 5, 2004) Virgin Records
- Bury Me Standing (February 14, 2012) Tarantulas Records

== EPs ==
- The Explosion (April 4, 2000) Jade Tree Records
- Steal This (October 31, 2000) Revelation Records
- Sick of Modern Art (October 31, 2003) Tarantulas Records
- Red Tape (October 31, 2004) Tarantulas Records
- Here I Am (October 31, 2005) Virgin Records
- No Revolution (October 31, 2005) Virgin Records

== Live albums ==
- Live in Boston (June 21, 2005) Instant Live
- Live from the Troubadour (October 31, 2005) Tarantulas Records

== Compilation ==
- Location Is Everything, Vol. 1 (April 16, 2002) Jade Tree Records

== Singles ==
Year	Single	Peak chart positions		Album
Year	Single	US Main	UK	Album
2004	"Here I Am"	37	75	Black Tape
2005	"No Revolution"	—	107	Black Tape
"—" denotes releases that did not chart
