= NFL Street (video game series) =

- Genre: Sports
- Developers: EA Tiburon, Buzz Monkey Software
- Publisher: Electronic Arts
- Platforms: PlayStation 2, Xbox, GameCube, PlayStation Portable
- First release: NFL Street; January 13, 2004
- Latest release: NFL Street 3 November 14, 2006

NFL Street is a series of American football-themed sports video games developed by EA Tiburon and published by Electronic Arts under the EA Sports BIG label. The titles combine the talent and big names of the NFL with the atmosphere of street football.

== History ==
NFL Street is the first installment of the NFL Street series, developed by EA Tiburon, and published by Electronic Arts. It was released on January 13, 2004, for the PlayStation 2, GameCube, and Xbox. Similar to the Blitz series, NFL Street is seven-on-seven American football, modeled after its informal variant, street football. The player can create a team and complete challenges for rewards, play a pickup game with teams made from a pool of select NFL players, or play a regular exhibition game.

The sequel NFL Street 2 was released on December 22, 2004, for the PlayStation 2, GameCube, Xbox, and later for the PlayStation Portable as NFL Street 2: Unleashed. The game introduced new game modes such as Own The City, NFL Gauntlet, 4 on 4, and Crush The Carrier. It also introduced new wall moves (such as the wall juke), Gamebreaker 2's, and several new playing fields.

The third and final installment of the series, NFL Street 3, was released on November 14, 2006, for the PlayStation 2 and PlayStation Portable. New game modes include Bank, Playbook Elimination, and Yards For Points. The player can also perform specific Game Breaker moves whether on offense or defense, such as a Game Breaker juke or lock-on tackle.

== Games ==
Title	Availability			Release
Title	Sony	Nintendo	Microsoft	Release
NFL Street	PS2	GameCube	Xbox	January 13, 2004
NFL Street 2	PS2, PSP	GameCube	Xbox	December 22, 2004
NFL Street 3	PS2, PSP			November 14, 2006

== Reception ==
The series has received generally favorable reviews.

Game	Review Scores		
Game	IGN	GameSpot	Metacritic
NFL Street	92%	79%	80%
NFL Street 2	89%	71%	77%
NFL Street 3	80%	69%	70%

== See also ==
- FIFA Street
- NBA Street
