= Ricky Williams =

American football player (born 1977)

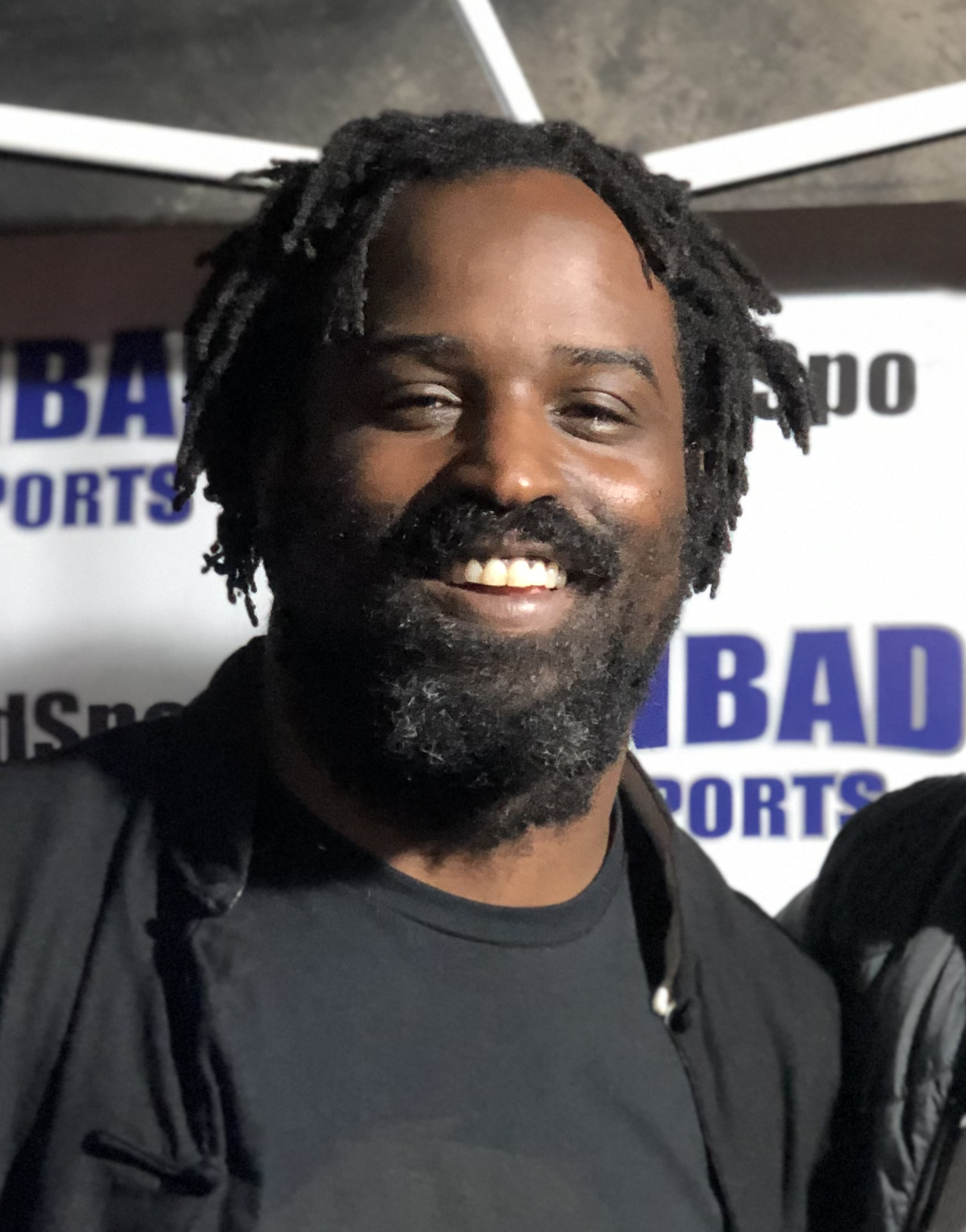
- Williams in 2020

No. 34, 27
- Position: Running back

Personal information
- Born: May 21, 1977 (age 49); San Diego, California, U.S.
- Listed height: 5 ft 10 in (1.78 m)
- Listed weight: 230 lb (104 kg)

Career information
- High school: Patrick Henry (San Diego)
- College: Texas (1995–1998)
- NFL draft: 1999: 1st round, 5th overall pick

Career history
- New Orleans Saints (1999–2001); Miami Dolphins (2002–2003, 2005); Toronto Argonauts (2006); Miami Dolphins (2007–2010); Baltimore Ravens (2011)

Awards and highlights
- First-team All-Pro (2002); Pro Bowl (2002); NFL rushing yards leader (2002); Heisman Trophy (1998); 2× Unanimous All-American (1997, 1998); Texas Longhorns No. 34 retired

Career NFL statistics
- Rushing attempts: 2,431
- Rushing yards: 10,009
- Rushing touchdowns: 66
- Receptions: 342
- Receiving yards: 2,606
- Receiving touchdowns: 8
- Stats at Pro Football Reference

Career CFL statistics
- Rushing attempts: 109
- Rushing yards: 526
- Rushing touchdowns: 2
- Receptions: 19
- Receiving yards: 127
- Stats at CFL.ca (archived)
- College Football Hall of Fame

Errick Miron (Note: In May 2022, Williams legally changed his last name to Miron, his wife's last name, after they married.) (born Errick Lynne Williams Jr.; May 21, 1977), known professionally as Ricky Williams, is an American former professional football running back who played in the National Football League (NFL) for 11 seasons. He played college football for the Texas Longhorns, winning the Heisman Trophy in 1998 after setting the NCAA Division I-A records for career rushing yards and all-purpose yards. Williams was selected in the first round of the 1999 NFL draft by the New Orleans Saints, who traded all their remaining picks to take him fifth overall. He spent three years in New Orleans before being traded to the Miami Dolphins.

During his first season with the Dolphins, Williams led the league in rushing yards, earning him Pro Bowl and first-team All-Pro honors. Williams retired in 2004 amid multiple failed drug tests, but returned to the Dolphins the following season. After being suspended from the NFL in 2006 for another failed drug test, Williams spent the year with the Toronto Argonauts of the Canadian Football League (CFL). Williams rejoined Miami a year later when his suspension ended. Following seven nonconsecutive seasons with the Dolphins, he played his last season in 2011 with the Baltimore Ravens. He was inducted to the College Football Hall of Fame in 2015.

== Early life ==
Williams was born (with his twin sister Cassie) to Sandy and Errick Williams. Growing up middle class, his parents were divorced by 1983 and Williams, at the age of three, began taking care of his younger sister Nisey by putting her to bed. His father later had three children through another marriage. Williams is the second cousin of Major League Baseball player Cecil Fielder. Williams was sent by his mother to counseling for anger problems as a youth. He took a test as a six-year-old that revealed he had the intelligence of someone twice his age, and earned honor roll recognition in high school. Williams once said, "I was always very bright, but not necessarily a hard worker. I think I was in eighth grade when I became really focused as a student and started getting good grades." He was named to the San Diego Union-Tribune All-Academic team. He had a brown belt in Taekwondo by age 12, and he started growing dreadlocks when he was 15.

At San Diego's Patrick Henry High School, Williams primarily played baseball and football, in addition to running track and wrestling. He notably lost a wrestling match to future NCAA wrestling champion and three-time Super Bowl champion Stephen Neal. During his junior year, he was named all-league in baseball as an outfielder and third baseman, and as a senior, he was named all-state.

Entering high school at 5 feet 9 inches (1.75 m) and 155 pounds (70 kg), Williams added an additional 25 pounds (11 kg) of weight before his junior season. He played outside linebacker and strong safety in addition to his primary position of running back. During his high school career, he rushed for a total of 4,129 yards and 55 touchdowns, and in his senior season he had 2,099 yards and 25 touchdowns, totals which earned him the San Diego Union-Tribune's 1994 Player of the Year award. Among his senior year performances were a 200-yard effort in a loss, a 248-yard (on 24 carries) and three-touchdown game, a 215-yard (21 carries) and two-touchdown showing, and a 143-yard (18 carries) and two-touchdown game. Against a top-ranked school, he had 129 yards on 24 carries and one touchdown, and Williams totaled 47 of the 69 yards Patrick Henry accumulated during the game-winning drive.

Williams helped Patrick Henry to its first Eastern League title in 11 years with a win against San Diego High School; Williams had 115 yards and two touchdowns in the first quarter of the game but suffered an Achilles tendon rupture early in the second quarter. Following two weeks of rest, Williams suited up for the first round of the CIF-San Diego Section Division 1 playoffs and, playing through pain from the injury, posted 94 yards on 25 carries in a 15–14 win. In the second round, Williams ran for 110 yards in a 21–17 victory, propelling Patrick Henry into the championship game. However, in the title game Patrick Henry lost 13–0 and Williams was held to a season-low 46 yards, with his team amassing just 62 yards of total offense.

The Scouting Evaluation Association rated Williams as the best high school running back in the state of California as a senior, while Super Prep labeled him as the second-best running back in California behind Sirr Parker and 14th-best in the country overall.

== College career ==
=== 1995–1997 ===
Williams attended the University of Texas at Austin, where he played for the Longhorns football team from 1995 to 1998. The Philadelphia Phillies, as part of his minor league baseball contract, paid for his scholarship to college.

Entering his freshman season, Williams was slated to begin as the starting fullback on the team. With Priest Holmes out for the 1995 season with an injury, Williams and Shon Mitchell started the season opener on the field together. Williams set a school record for rushing yards by a true freshman in the first game of the season against Hawaii with 95 yards. During the regular season, he rushed for a total of 990 yards on 166 attempts and eight touchdowns, breaking Earl Campbell's school record for rushing yards by a freshman. He had 62 yards in the 1995 Sugar Bowl against Virginia Tech. He was named Southwest Conference Freshman of the Year after the season.

Before his sophomore year in 1996, The Sporting News ranked Williams, who was sometimes known as the "Texas Tornado," as the best fullback in college football. He led Texas in rushing with 1,272 yards and had over 100 yards rushing in seven games during the season. Against Penn State in the 1997 Fiesta Bowl, he rushed for 48 yards and tied a bowl record for catches in a game with nine receptions.

Williams moved to running back for his junior year in 1997, and Bob Griese's Football Magazine considered him as the second-best candidate for the Heisman Trophy going into the season. He scored five touchdowns in a game against Rice, setting school and Big 12 Conference records. During a game against Kansas, he broke the school record for career touchdowns with 43. Williams finished the season with 1,893 rushing yards on 279 attempts and 25 rushing touchdowns, leading the nation in rushing yards and co-leading in rushing touchdowns. He set single-season school records for rushing yards, carries, and rushing touchdowns in a season, as well as all-purpose yards with 2,043. He had the highest rushing yards per game in Division I-A with 172.0, and he earned fifth place for Heisman balloting with 135 points. He won the Doak Walker Award in December 1997, and was a unanimous All-American selection.

=== 1998 ===
Williams returned to Texas for his senior season, opting to forgo the 1998 NFL draft, in which he was projected to be drafted between the fourth and seventh picks. Texas provided him with a $2.8 million insurance policy for returning, in the event that he became injured and was picked lower in the draft as a result. In the first game of the season, against New Mexico State, he broke his own school record for rushing touchdowns in a game with six. In the next game against UCLA, he broke Earl Campbell's career school rushing record with 4,530 total yards. He scored six touchdowns again in a game against Rice, in addition to gaining 318 yards. He also became Texas's all-time leading scorer during the game, with 344 career points, and set a school record for all-purpose yards in a game with 350. Against Iowa State, he rushed for 350 yards and five touchdowns, breaking the single-game school record for rushing yards. In the game, Williams broke the record for career total touchdowns with 67. He helped beat longtime rival Oklahoma by rushing for 166 yards and two scores. In a game against Baylor, in which he rushed for 259 yards, Williams broke the NCAA Division I-A record for career points scored with 428.

Williams broke the NCAA Division I-A career rushing record held by Tony Dorsett on November 27, 1998, in a game against Texas A&M, on a 60-yard touchdown run. The game was briefly paused while Williams received the game ball and was honored by a group of dignitaries, including Dorsett. He finished the game racking up 259 yards on a career-high 44 carries, and also broke the Division I-A career all-purpose yards record with 7,206 yards. The record-breaking touchdown was later named the Compaq College Football Play of the Year, and the football used during the play was sent to the College Football Hall of Fame. Williams led Division I-A in rushing for the 1998 season with 2,124 yards and 27 touchdowns. Williams won his second straight Doak Walker Award, the Walter Camp Award, the Maxwell Award, the Associated Press College Football Player of the Year, the Sporting News College Football Player of the Year, the Best College Football Player ESPY Award, and the Big 12 Conference Offensive Player of the Year awards after the 1998 season. He was a unanimous All-America selection for the second straight season. He received the 64th Heisman Trophy, becoming the second Texas Longhorn to win this honor, joining Earl Campbell. Williams received 2,355 points in the Heisman ballot. In the 1999 Cotton Bowl Classic, he set a bowl record with 248 all-purpose yards and was named MVP. After the season, he played in the Hula Bowl all-star game.

Williams broke or tied 21 NCAA Division I-A records, 24 Big 12 Conference records, and 46 Texas Longhorns school records in his career. The University of Wisconsin's Ron Dayne broke Williams' record for career rushing yards one year later in 1999. Texas retired his No. 34 jersey in May 1999. Along with Earl Campbell, Williams has a statue on the grounds of Darrell K. Royal – Texas Memorial Stadium, on the University of Texas campus in Austin, Texas, to commemorate their Heisman Trophy wins.

Williams was inducted into the College Football Hall of Fame in 2015 and the Cotton Bowl Hall of Fame in 2018.

== Minor league baseball ==
Williams was drafted in the eighth round of the 1995 Major League Baseball June amateur draft out of high school by the Philadelphia Phillies. He signed a contract with the team with a $50,000 signing bonus. During his collegiate career, he played four seasons in the Phillies' farm system, never playing beyond Single–A. An outfielder, Williams played in 170 games and finished his career with a .211 batting average, 4 home runs, and 46 stolen bases.

Williams played for the Martinsville Phillies, a rookie league team in the Appalachian League affiliated with the Philadelphia Phillies, for 36 games in 1995. He had a batting average of .239 with 11 runs batted in (RBI) with the team. In 1996 and 1997, he played with the Piedmont Boll Weevils, the Phillies' Single–A affiliate in the South Atlantic League. He hit .188 with 30 runs scored and 20 RBI in 84 games with the team in 1996, and he hit .206 with 12 runs scored and 6 RBI in 1997. During his third year, he was teammates with Phillies' eventual starting shortstop Jimmy Rollins, who declared Williams the fastest man he had ever seen. Williams played for the Batavia Muckdogs, the Phillies' Low–A affiliate of the New York–Penn League, in 1998. He played in 12 games for Batavia, hitting .288, before cutting his season short to return to Texas for his senior year of football.

Williams was selected in the 1998 Rule 5 draft by the Montreal Expos on December 14, 1998, who then traded his rights to the Texas Rangers. The Rangers were owned by Tom Hicks, who was a Texas Longhorns booster. Williams was placed on the Rangers' 40-man major league roster, but he wrote a letter in March 1999 to the team stating he would not report for spring training so he could prepare for the NFL draft. The Rangers subsequently placed him on their restricted list, and he never played for the team.

== Professional career ==
=== New Orleans Saints ===
Pre-draft measurables
Height	Weight	Arm length	Hand span	40-yard dash	10-yard split	20-yard split	Vertical jump	Broad jump	Bench press
5 ft 10 3/4 in (1.80 m)	244 lb (111 kg)	29 1/2 in (0.75 m)	7 3/4 in (0.20 m)	4.56 s	1.61 s	2.62 s	37 in (0.94 m)	10 ft 4 in (3.15 m)	22 reps
All values from NFL Combine

Williams attended the NFL Scouting Combine 20 pounds overweight and declined to participate in workouts. He held a private workout for NFL teams at the University of California, San Diego, in April 1999. He weighed in at 224 pounds at the workout, lower than the 244 pounds he weighed at the Combine. The Cleveland Browns held the first pick in the 1999 NFL draft, and after Williams's workout, their coach Chris Palmer said Williams was a finalist for the pick along with quarterbacks Tim Couch and Akili Smith. The team selected Couch, and the Philadelphia Eagles, with the second pick in the draft, despite fans wanting the team to select Williams, picked Donovan McNabb.

Williams was selected as the fifth pick overall in the 1999 NFL draft by the New Orleans Saints. Head coach Mike Ditka traded all of the Saints' remaining 1999 draft picks (the second round pick had already been traded to the Rams to get Eddie Kennison) to the Washington Redskins to get Williams, as well as first- and third-round picks the following year. This was the first time one player was the only draft pick of an NFL team.

Williams and Ditka posed for the cover of ESPN The Magazine as a bride and a groom with the heading "For Better or for Worse." Rapper Master P's organization No Limit Sports negotiated his seven-year, $11.1 million contract, which was largely incentive-laden; he received an $8.84 million signing bonus with salary incentives potentially worth up to $68.4 million should he hit all of his incentives, with most of them requiring higher than top-level production to attain. The contract was criticized by legions of people, both sports agents and writers, who realized that Williams's position entitled him to much more in guaranteed money. In the 2020 BET docuseries No Limit Chronicles, Williams emphasized that he personally pushed for the terms of the contract, stating that the signing bonus was his "reward for what [he] did in college, but everything else [he does he] should have [had] to earn." After spraining his ankle in the preseason and battling injuries throughout his rookie year, he made only one incentive and earned only $125,000, the league minimum, prompting further criticism of No Limit Sports and his agent Leland Hardy. Williams said, "I think maybe Master P underestimated how white professional sports were." Williams later fired No Limit Sports and made Leigh Steinberg his agent. Ditka was later fired for the team's poor performance.

Williams spent three seasons (1999–2001) with the Saints. He made his NFL debut with ten carries for 40 yards in a 19–10 victory over the Carolina Panthers. As a rookie, he had 884 rushing yards and two rushing touchdowns in 12 games. In 2000, he rushed for 1,000 yards and scored nine total touchdowns in 10 games. He missed the team's last six regular-season games and first playoff game due to an injury suffered in a game against the Panthers. The Saints finished the 2000 regular season with a 10–6 record and recorded the franchise's first-ever playoff game win against the St. Louis Rams. The next season was a successful one for Williams. One notable performance for Williams was in Week 4 in a 28–15 victory over the Minnesota Vikings, where he rushed for 136 rushing yards and a touchdown to earn NFC Offensive Player of the Week honors. His 411 rushing yards, two rushing touchdowns, 22 receptions, and 157 receiving yards in the month of October earned him NFC Offensive Player of the month. Overall, Williams rushed for 1,245 yards, finishing eighth in the NFL. He caught 60 passes for 511 yards in his last season with the Saints.

=== Miami Dolphins ===
==== First stint ====
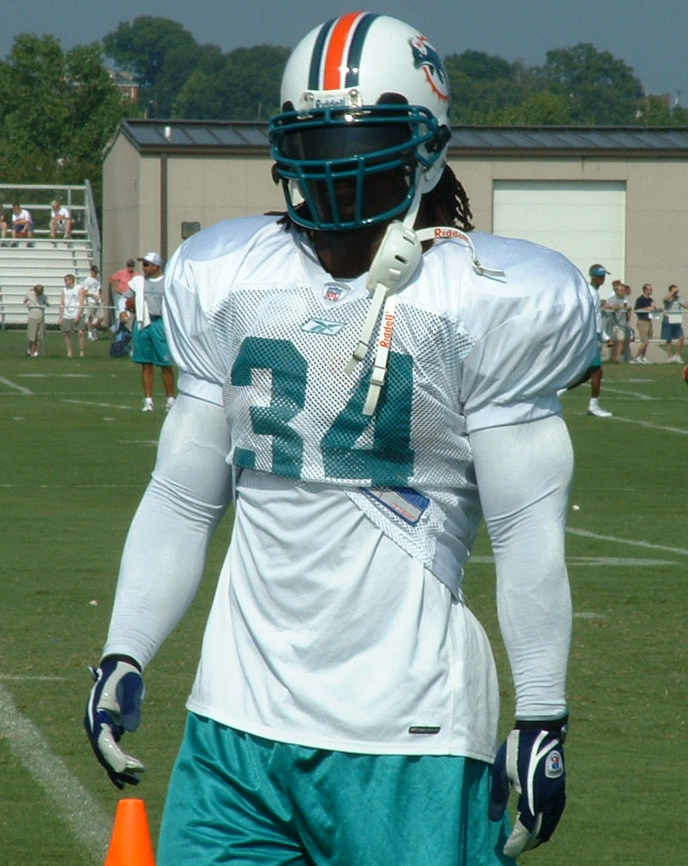
Williams during his first stint with the Dolphins.

Williams was traded to the Miami Dolphins on March 8, 2002, for four draft picks, including two first-round picks. In 2002, his first season with the Dolphins, he had a stellar season with ten games with at least 100 rushing yards. In Week 12, against the San Diego Chargers, he had 143 rushing yards and two rushing touchdowns to earn AFC Offensive Player of the Week. He followed that up with 228 rushing yards and two rushing touchdowns against the Buffalo Bills. In the following game, against the Chicago Bears, he had 216 rushing yards and two rushing touchdowns to earn another AFC Offensive Player of the Week honor. Overall, he was the NFL's leading rusher with 1,853 yards, a first-team All-Pro and a Pro Bowler.

In the 2003 season, Williams had 1,372 rushing yards, nine rushing touchdowns, 50 receptions, 351 receiving yards, and one receiving touchdown.

Williams was noted for his dreadlocks hair style, but he shaved them off during a trip to Australia. His shyness made Williams appear somewhat of an oddball. "Ricky's just a different guy", former Saints receiver Joe Horn explained. "People he wanted to deal with, he did. And people he wanted to have nothing to do with, he didn't. No one could understand that. I don't think guys in the locker room could grasp that he wanted to be to himself – you know, quiet. If you didn't understand him and didn't know what he was about, it always kept people in suspense." Besides keeping to himself, Williams was known for conducting post-game interviews with his helmet on (complete with tinted visor) and avoiding eye contact. Williams was later diagnosed with social anxiety disorder.

==== Early retirement from football ====
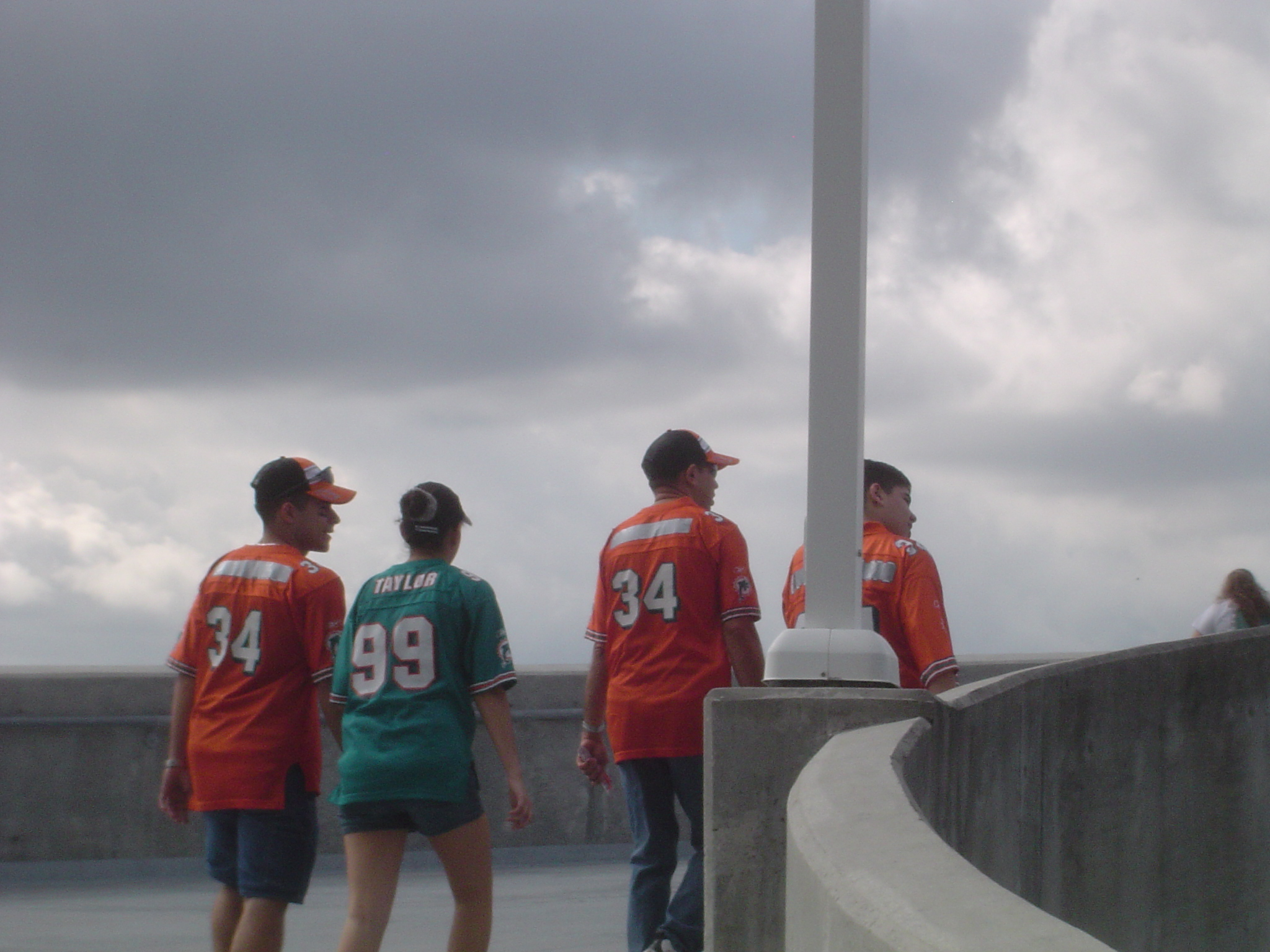
Miami Dolphins fans block out his name on their jerseys after hearing about Williams' drug-related suspension and subsequent retirement from the NFL in 2004.

It was announced on May 14, 2004, that Williams tested positive for marijuana in December 2003 and faced a $650,000 fine and a four-game suspension for violating the NFL's substance-abuse policy. He previously tested positive for marijuana shortly after he joined the Dolphins. Shortly before training camp was to begin in July 2004, Williams publicly disclosed his intent to retire from professional football.

Rumored to have failed a third drug test before announcing his retirement, Williams made his retirement official on August 2, 2004. Williams was ineligible to play for the 2004 season, and studied Ayurveda, the ancient Indian system of holistic medicine, at the California College of Ayurveda that autumn in Grass Valley, California. The Dolphins finished the 2004 season with a 4–12 record.

Williams maintains that he does not regret the retirement decision. He thinks that it was the "most positive thing" he has ever done in his life, allowing him time to find himself.

==== Return to football ====
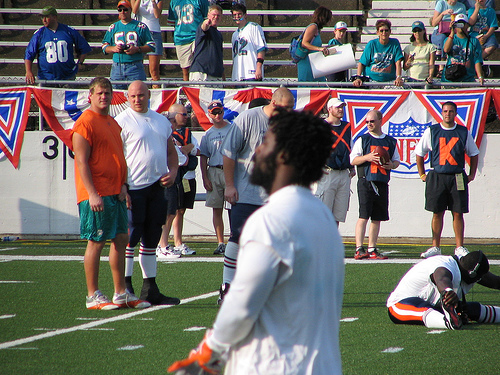
Williams at the 2005 Pro Football Hall of Fame Game.

Williams officially returned to the Dolphins on July 24, 2005, paid back a percentage of his signing bonus and completed his four-game suspension for a failed drug test. At his return press conference, Williams expressed his apologies for leaving the team two days before the start of training camp, which had contributed to the Dolphins' having their worst season in years. Williams finished with six touchdowns and a 4.4 yards per carry average on 168 carries and 743 yards during 2005. While he shared time with Ronnie Brown, he did run for 172 yards in Week 16 against the Tennessee Titans, and 108 yards in Week 17 against the New England Patriots.

On February 20, 2006, the NFL announced that Williams had violated the league's drug policy for the fourth time. His mother reportedly said she did not think it was another marijuana violation, and that he may have been in India when he was supposed to be tested. On April 25, 2006, Williams was suspended for the entire 2006 season. It has been suggested that the substance may have been an herb related to his interest in holistic medicine.

=== Toronto Argonauts ===
With Williams suspended for the entire 2006 NFL season, the Toronto Argonauts of the Canadian Football League (CFL) decided to put Williams on their negotiation list for the 2006 season. This guaranteed that the team would become the rightful CFL organization to negotiate with Williams if his NFL contract were to be terminated at any time. The Dolphins allowed Williams to play for the Argonauts on the condition that he would return to them in 2007.

On May 28, 2006, Williams became the highest-paid running back in the CFL when he signed a one-year Can$340,000 contract with the Argonauts. He chose to wear the #27 on his jersey.

The signing drew the ire of former Argonauts quarterback Joe Theismann. On May 30, 2006, Theismann was interviewed by Toronto radio station The Fan 590 whereupon he criticized the Argonauts for signing the suspended Williams. Theismann claimed he was disgraced to be associated with a team that would knowingly sign "an addict" such as Williams. The CFL had no substance abuse policy in place, nor did it prohibit its teams from signing players suspended from other leagues, despite Williams being under contract with the Dolphins for the 2006 season.

The Argonauts' ownership responded to Theismann's criticism, noting that Theismann's son, Joe, pleaded guilty in 2002 to a felony charge of possessing drug paraphernalia. He received a 10-year suspended prison term, was placed on five years of probation and fined. "It's really a delicate subject for him to attack someone if he has that in his own family", Argo co-owner David Cynamon said. "If I was his son and he's calling [Williams] a drug addict and he should quit and he's a loser, I'd be shattered. This thing is really bothersome."

Williams made his official CFL debut on June 17, 2006, in a home game against the Tiger-Cats at the Rogers Centre. In that game, he rushed for 97 yards on 18 carries, with his longest carry for 35 yards in the fourth quarter. Williams caught two passes for 24 yards as the Argonauts defeated the Tiger-Cats by a score of 27–17.

On July 22, 2006, Williams suffered a broken bone in his left arm during a game against the Saskatchewan Roughriders in Regina, Saskatchewan. He underwent surgery on July 23, 2006, to repair the broken bone. Shortly after injuring his arm, Williams suffered yet another injury after a door at the Argonauts' practice facility swung behind him and clipped the running back on his left achilles tendon requiring 16 stitches to close the gash. During his recovery, Williams received hyperbaric oxygen therapy in St. Catharines, Ontario to expedite his return from injury. In all, Williams missed two months of game action because of the injuries, returning on September 23, 2006, against the Calgary Stampeders.

In the 11 games that he played during 2006 CFL regular season, Williams rushed 109 times for 526 yards, scoring two touchdowns, with a long run of 35 yards. He caught 19 passes for 127 yards.

Williams stated his love for Toronto and mentioned the possibility of returning to the Canadian game during his professional career. "I was thinking it wouldn't be bad to come back up here and kind of follow the same steps as Pinner – play here a couple years and maybe get a chance to coach up here", Williams said. "Because I really like Toronto, I really like this organization … you can live here, you know? You feel like you have a life. I come to work, I go home, play with my kid, walk to the store. It's really nice. I get to teach. It's wonderful here." In another interview, he expressed further desire to remain in the CFL, "If I came back here, you can put me anywhere", he says. "Up here, I can play offense, defense, special teams. I can do everything. I can block, play tight end, running back, receiver — even play the line. The NFL is so structured — 'You do this.' Here I can do so much."

With the controversy over, the Argonauts signing Williams prompted outgoing CFL commissioner Tom Wright, in his final state of the league address, to introduce a new rule that would come in effect before the start of the 2007 CFL season that would prevent a player under suspension in the NFL from signing with a CFL club. This rule has been informally dubbed "The Ricky Williams Rule."

The new rule, however, was grandfathered so that players who were still playing in the league, such as Argonaut tackle Bernard Williams, who was suspended by the NFL for drug abuse and did not seek reinstatement when the ban ended, could continue playing.

=== Miami Dolphins (second stint) ===
On May 11, 2007, an anonymous source reported that Williams had failed a drug test again. The source indicated that NFL medical advisors had recommended to the commissioner that Williams not be allowed to apply for reinstatement that September.

Williams adhered to a strict regimen of multiple drug tests per week in 2007 as part of his attempt to be reinstated by the NFL. He practiced yoga, which, he claimed, helped him to stop using marijuana. In October 2007, NFL commissioner Roger Goodell granted his request for reinstatement. Williams returned for a Monday Night Football game on November 26, 2007. He rushed six times for 15 yards before Lawrence Timmons, a Pittsburgh Steelers linebacker, stepped on his right shoulder, tearing his pectoral muscle. The next day it was reported that he would miss the rest of the season, and on November 28, Williams was placed on injured reserve.

Williams bounced back in the 2008 season, rushing for 659 yards on 160 carries and scoring four touchdowns while playing in all 16 games for the Dolphins. He and Ronnie Brown ran the Wildcat formation together, resulting in an 11–5 season for the Dolphins.

In 2009, during the Dolphins ninth game, starting running back Ronnie Brown suffered a season-ending injury, and Williams, at age 32, became the starter for the remainder of the year. In Week 11, against the Carolina Panthers, he had 22 carries for 119 yards and two touchdowns to earn AFC Offensive Player of the Week. He finished the season with 1,121 yards rushing and a 4.7 yards per carry, along the way setting an NFL record of the longest time span (six years) between 1,000 yard seasons (2003–2009). Williams also became only the seventh player in NFL history to begin a season age 32 or older and reach 1,000 yards rushing during that season.

In the 2010 season, Williams carried 159 times for 673 yards and two touchdowns for the Dolphins while splitting duties, averaging 4.2 yards a carry at the age of 33.

=== Baltimore Ravens ===
Williams signed a two-year, $2.5 million contract with the Baltimore Ravens on August 8, 2011. Williams scored his first touchdown of the season against the Houston Texans on October 16. He finished the 2011 season with 444 rushing yards and two rushing touchdowns. On January 1, 2012, Williams surpassed the 10,000 career rushing yards mark and became the 26th player in the history of the NFL to do so.

On February 7, 2012, Williams informed the Ravens of his retirement from the NFL. He was nominated for the Pro Football Hall of Fame in 2023 and 2024.

== Career statistics ==
=== NFL ===
Legend
	Led the league
**Bold**	Career high

Year	Team	GP	Rushing						Receiving						Fumbles	
Year	Team	GP	Att	Yds	Avg	Lng	TD	FD	Rec	Yds	Avg	Lng	TD	FD	Fum	Lost
1999	NO	12	253	884	3.5	25	2	45	28	172	6.1	29	0	8	6	3
2000	NO	10	248	1,000	4.0	26	8	56	44	409	**9.3**	24	1	**19**	6	3
2001	NO	16	313	1,245	4.0	46	6	58	**60**	**511**	8.5	42	1	**19**	8	6
2002	MIA	16	383	**1,853**	**4.8**	63	**16**	**89**	47	363	7.7	52	1	14	7	5
2003	MIA	16	**392**	1,372	3.5	45	9	68	50	351	7.0	**59**	1	11	7	5
2005	MIA	12	168	743	4.4	35	6	37	17	93	5.5	19	0	3	1	1
2006	MIA	0	Suspended													
2007	MIA	1	6	15	2.5	6	0	2	—	—	—	—	—	—	1	1
2008	MIA	16	160	659	4.1	51	4	35	29	219	7.6	47	1	9	5	2
2009	MIA	16	241	1,121	4.7	**68**	11	55	35	264	7.5	**59**	**2**	9	5	2
2010	MIA	16	159	673	4.2	45	2	26	19	141	7.4	28	1	6	4	2
2011	BAL	16	108	444	4.1	28	2	20	13	83	6.4	18	0	5	2	2
Career		147	2,431	10,009	4.1	68	66	491	342	2,606	7.6	59	8	103	52	32

=== College ===
Legend
	Led the NCAA
**Bold**	Career high

Season	Team	GP	Rushing					Receiving		
Season	Team	GP	Att	Yds	Avg	Lng	TD	Rec	Yds	TD
1995	Texas	13	178	1,052	5.9	65	8	16	224	1
1996	Texas	13	216	1,320	6.1	75	13	**33**	**307**	**2**
1997	Texas	11	279	1,893	**6.8**	**87**	25	20	150	0
1998	Texas	12	**391**	**2,327**	6.0	68	**29**	29	**307**	1
Career		49	1,064	6,592	6.2	87	75	98	988	4

- Note that the table includes Williams' performances in bowl games, which, prior to 2002, were not included in official NCAA career statistics.

== Career highlights ==
=== Awards and honors ===
NFL

- First-team All-Pro (2002)
- Pro Bowl (2002)
- Pro Bowl MVP (2002)
- NFL rushing yards leader (2002)

College

- Heisman Trophy (1998)
- Maxwell Award (1998)
- Walter Camp Award (1998)
- AP College Football Player of the Year (1998)
- SN Player of the Year (1998)
- Chic Harley Award (1998)
- 2× Doak Walker Award (1997, 1998)
- 2× Jim Brown Trophy (1997, 1998)
- 2× Unanimous All-American (1997, 1998)
- 2× NCAA rushing yards leader (1997, 1998)
- 2× NCAA rushing touchdowns leader (1997, 1998)
- 2× Big 12 Offensive Player of the Year (1997, 1998)
- 3× First-team All-Big 12 (1996–1998)
- Second-team All-SWC (1995)
- Cotton Bowl Hall of Fame
- Texas Longhorns No. 34 retired

=== Miami Dolphins franchise records ===
- Most rushing yards (season): 1,853 (2002)

== After football ==
In 2013, Williams was hired as the running backs coach at the University of Incarnate Word in San Antonio, where he worked for two seasons. In 2015 he returned to Texas to get his degree in educational psychology, which he completed in 2017. He then served as an analyst on Longhorn Network's GameDay show for several years. He then became a wellness expert and entrepreneur, co-founder of Real Wellness Herbal, a licensed astrologer and CEO of LILA Astrology, spokesman, podcaster and involved in numerous business ventures.

== Personal life ==
Williams is a medical cannabis advocate. He once stated his "personal goal is to elevate the legitimacy of cannabis as a medicine and the respect of medical professionals for cannabis users." By 1999, Williams had several tattoos: one of a spider web on his shoulder, one of Mickey Mouse on his biceps, a barbed wire around his arm, one of a dagger on his pectoral, and a Gemini symbol on his other pectoral.

Williams has admitted being very shy and was diagnosed with social anxiety disorder, borderline personality disorder, and avoidant personality disorder with which he struggled to cope during his football career. Williams was treated with therapy and medication. Williams was briefly a spokesperson for the drug Paxil as treatment. He worked with the drug company GlaxoSmithKline to educate the public about the disorder. Williams later quit using Paxil and said that cannabis was a much better form of treatment.

Williams is a qualified yoga instructor. He has stated that one of his main reasons for joining the Canadian Football League's Toronto Argonauts was for the opportunity to teach free yoga lessons at a local Toronto yoga facility. It has been reported that Williams uses pranic healing, no-touch energy healing system, to recover from injuries. In 2009, Williams enrolled at Acupuncture and Massage College in Miami, Florida to study massage therapy and Japanese Shiatsu. In 2018, Williams co-founded an herbal wellness company with his second wife Linnea Miron named Real.

In May 2022, Williams legally changed his last name to Miron, his wife's last name, after they married.

The son of a minister, Williams was raised Southern Baptist and attended church twice a week during his childhood. He still self-identifies as a Christian, but his yoga study opened his mind to other religions, and his exact views on religion are difficult to label. He believes religions are cultural, and his beliefs are inclusive of at least some Christian, Muslim, Buddhist, and Hindu philosophies. Williams is in the first year of a master's program at Emperor's College of Traditional Oriental Medicine in Santa Monica, CA.

In 2015, Williams signed with global talent agency William Morris Endeavor (WME) for representation in media prior to being inducted into the College Football Hall of Fame.

Williams is a vegetarian. He was previously a vegan or at least had a meat-free diet. Tim Graham has reported that Greek yogurt is the only non-vegan food in Williams's diet. PETA has used video of him praising meatless alternatives to popular chicken dishes.

Williams was the single-largest victim of professional scam artist/fraudster Peggy Ann Fulford (Peggy King, Peggy Williams, Peggy Ann Barard, etc.), who stole $3.01 million from Williams, amongst the $5.79 million in total she stole from him, Travis Best, Dennis Rodman, Rashad McCants, Lex Hilliard and others. Fulford, who was indicted by the FBI in December 2016, continued her criminal activity until sentenced in February 2018 to 10 years in prison and full financial restitution (unlikely) to her victims.

== In the media ==
- Williams appeared as a football analyst on the Longhorn Network for Texas GameDay and Texas GameDay Final.
- Williams appeared in an infomercial for Natural Golf alongside Mike Ditka and appeared alongside him in a wedding dress on the cover of ESPN The Magazine.
- HBO's Inside the NFL had a skit about Williams trying to return to the Dolphins. It featured him trying to raise $8.6 million, avoiding drug tests, and even asking Dan Marino to return with him.
- Williams appeared on the cover of NCAA Football 2000.
- Williams's likeness appeared on the cover of the original NFL Street. He did not appear in the sequels NFL Street 2 or NFL Street 3 as both games were released during his suspended seasons (2004 and 2006).
- Williams played a cameo role in the feature film Stuck on You.
- Williams makes an appearance on the third season of the physical reality game show, Pros vs. Joes on SpikeTV
- Williams is the subject of an ESPN Films documentary entitled "Run Ricky Run". It is part of ESPN's 30 for 30 documentary series.
- Williams is the subject of an NFL Network film Ricky Williams: A Football Life.
- In 2017 Williams participated in The New Celebrity Apprentice, finishing in 7th place.
- In 2018, Williams appeared on seventeenth season of Hell's Kitchen as guest star, and cooking in pair with the contestant.
- On January 13, 2019, it was announced Williams would be a houseguest in the second American season of the reality show competition Celebrity Big Brother. Williams finished as the season's runner up, losing to Tamar Braxton.
- On February 11, 2022, Williams appeared on the Real Time with Bill Maher.

== See also ==
- List of NCAA Division I FBS running backs with at least 50 career rushing touchdowns
- List of NCAA major college football yearly rushing leaders
- List of NCAA major college football yearly scoring leaders
- List of New Orleans Saints first-round draft picks
- List of celebrities who own cannabis businesses
- List of Texas Longhorns football All-Americans
- List of doping cases in sport
- Cannabis and sports

== Sources ==
- Richardson, Steve (October 1999). Ricky Williams: Dreadlocks to Ditka. Sports Publishing Inc. ISBN 978-1-58261-144-0.
