= Flash Flash Flash =

Studio album by the Explosion
- Released: 2000
- Recorded: February 2000
- Genre: Punk rock
- Length: 27:22
- Label: Jade Tree

The Explosion chronology
The Explosion (2000)	Flash Flash Flash (2000)	Steal This (2000)

Flash Flash Flash is the first album by the Explosion. It was released in 2000 on Jade Tree Records.

== Critical reception ==
Professional ratings
Review scores
Source	Rating
AllMusic	4.5/5 stars
Robert Christgau	(choice cut)
Reno Gazette–Journal	3/5 stars
Rolling Stone	2/5 stars

The Washington Post wrote: "Flash Flash Flash is an artifact from the open-nerve period of adolescent development, when everything hurts and going faster is the only thing that eases the pain. In other words, this music sounds very familiar, but that doesn't matter."

== Track listing ==
1. "No Revolution" – 2:21
2. "God Bless the S.O.S." – 1:36
3. "Reactor" – 2:25
4. "Broken Down and Out" – 2:10
5. "Outbound Line" – 2:13
6. "Tarantulas Attack" – 1:27
7. "Terrorist" – 2:46
8. "The Ideal" – 1:41
9. "If You Don't Know" – 2:09
10. "Novocaine" – 1:20
11. "Leave It in the Dirt" – 1:47
12. "Conniption Fit" – 1:59
13. "Points West" – 1:34
14. "True or False" – 1:54
