= Touch football (American) =

Variant of American football

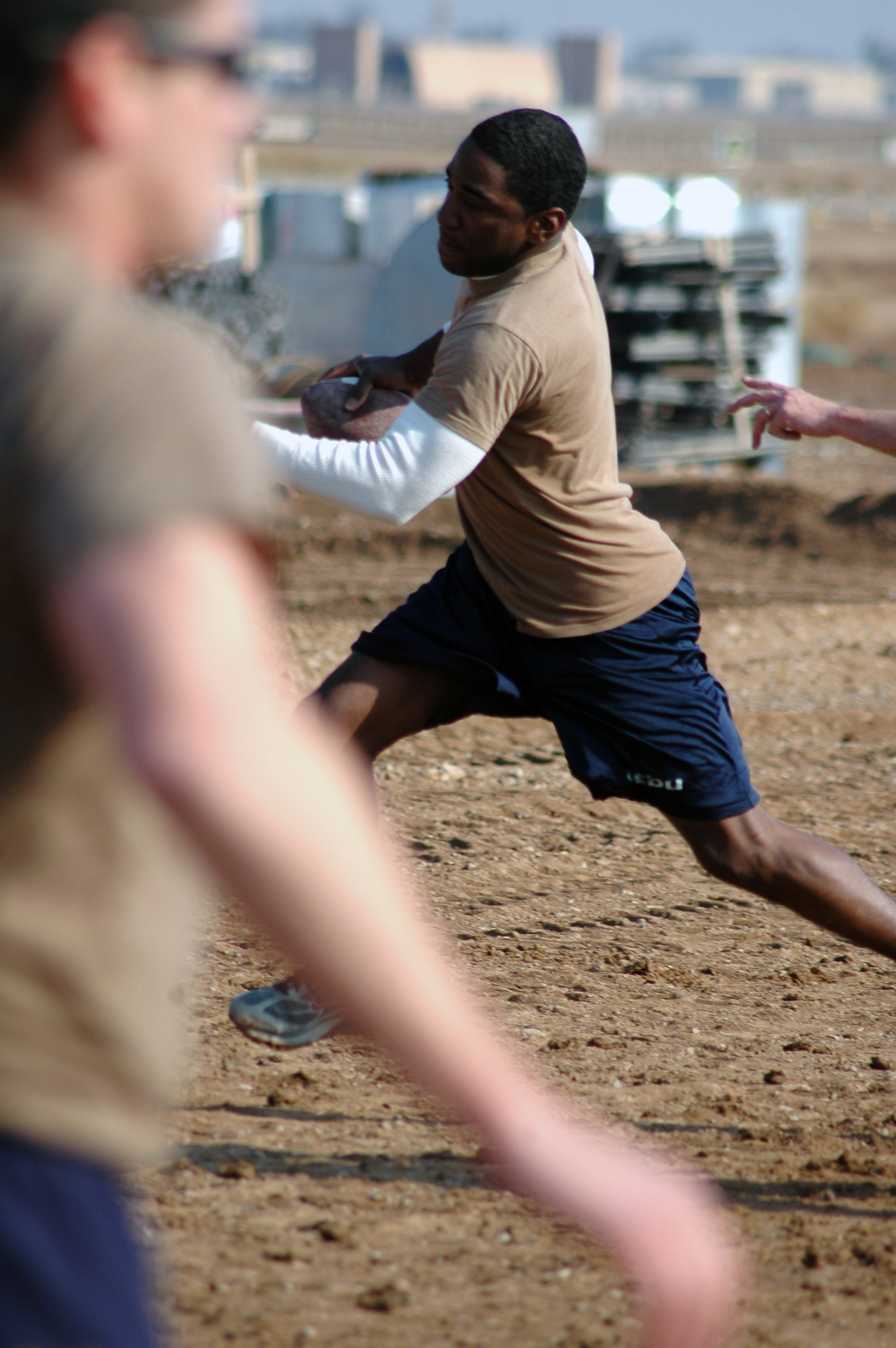
Offensive touch football player tries to get out of reach of defending player.

Touch football is an amateur variant of American football and Canadian football. The basic rules are similar to those of the mainstream game (called "tackle football" for contrast), but to end a down, the person carrying the ball need only be touched, instead of tackled, by a member of the opposite team. This rule change gave the game its name, to differentiate it from other variants. It is similar to street football, another amateur variant, but in street football full contact is allowed.

== Rules ==
The rules of the game can vary in similarity to traditional American or Canadian football depending on the skill of the players, the available playing field, and the purpose of the game. Touch football can be played by teams of as few as two or as many as twelve on each side; usually, games consist of teams of four to seven.

Positions in touch football are far less formal than its more organized counterpart. While some games roughly follow conventions, more often, all players will be considered eligible receivers (as in six-man football), and there are usually no running backs. There may or may not be a snapper; if there is not, the quarterback initiates play by hovering the ball above the line of scrimmage and pulling it backward to simulate a snap.

Some games will implement a "blitz count", or a period of time that must elapse after the snap before the defense may cross the line of scrimmage in order to attempt to tackle the quarterback. This gives the quarterback time to complete a pass in the absence of effective blocking (when teams are small, there is often no blocking at all). Other games will not use a count and thus blocking becomes important. Conversely, in the presence of a "blitz count" there is also often a "QB sneak" rule, which prevents the quarterback from crossing the line of scrimmage before the blitz count is finished to prevent taking advantage of the count.

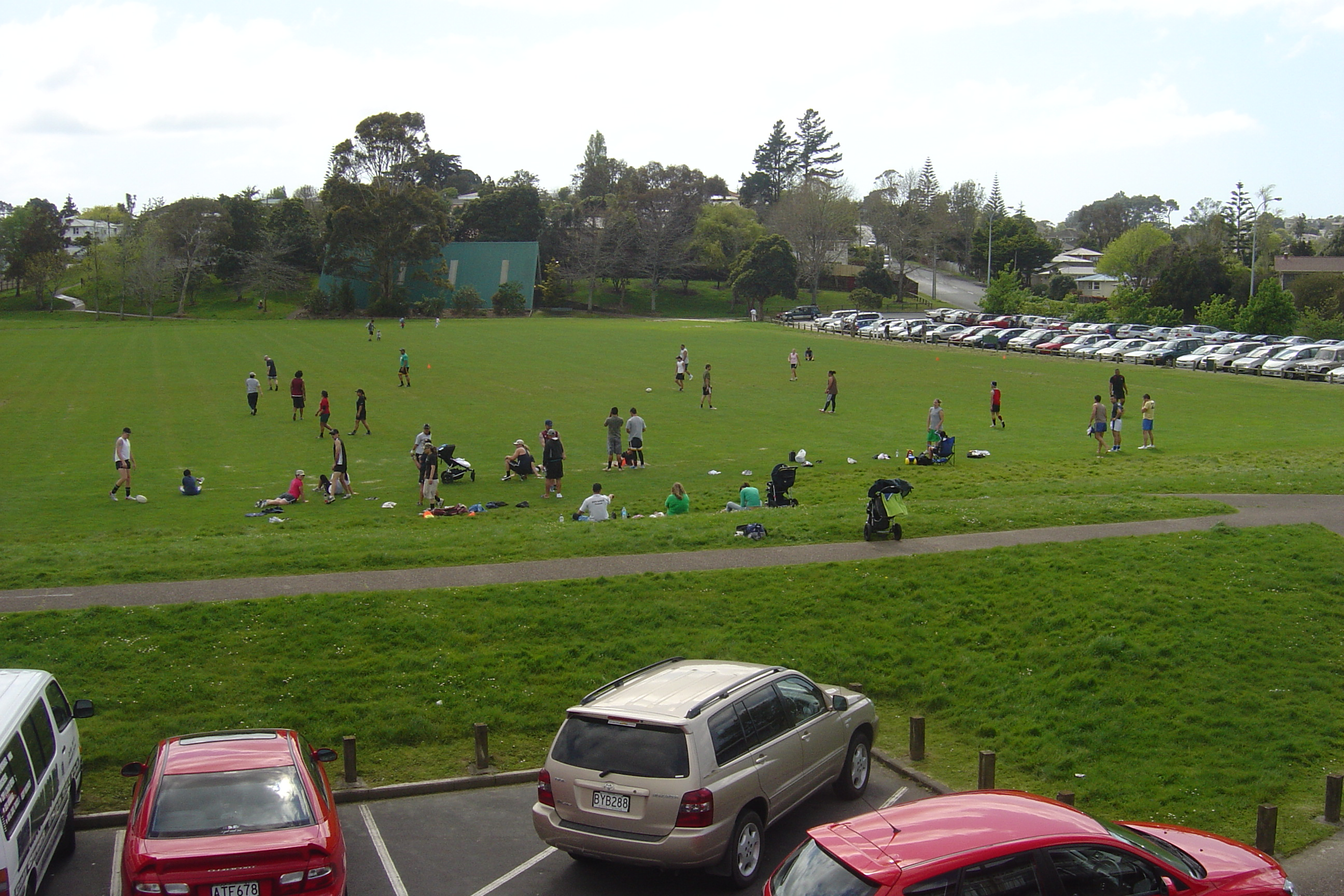
Field during a recreational touch ball game.

Because of these rules, passing plays are far more common than running plays in touch football.

Along with the size of the teams, the size of the field can vary considerably. Many games are played in the front and back yards of suburban and rural village neighborhoods, where the whole field may not be much more than ten to thirty yards long. In most of these situations, there are no yard lines, requiring some change in the definition of a first down. Instead of requiring that a team advance the ball ten yards, sometimes two pass completions result in a first down. Another option is to eliminate first downs, so that a team gets four (sometimes five) chances to score; this process is most desirable on shorter fields. Longer playing fields can be found in parks and spring-practice situations.

When an odd number of players are playing, it is common to allow one player to be an "all-time Quarterback" player; this player will always be on the offense or the kicking team, switching sides throughout the game. This is often better known as a "Steady Quarterback" or "Steady Q". When this occurs, there is usually no blitz count, and the all-time quarterback is usually never allowed to cross the line of scrimmage.

Another common variation is the elimination of the field goal and extra point kick; this is usually due to the absence of goal posts and tees on the field. Some games eliminate kicking altogether, directing the teams to start each possession after a touchdown at the twenty-yard line, as if a kickoff and touch back had just occurred; other players prefer to change the kickoff into a "throw-off" or a "punt-off".

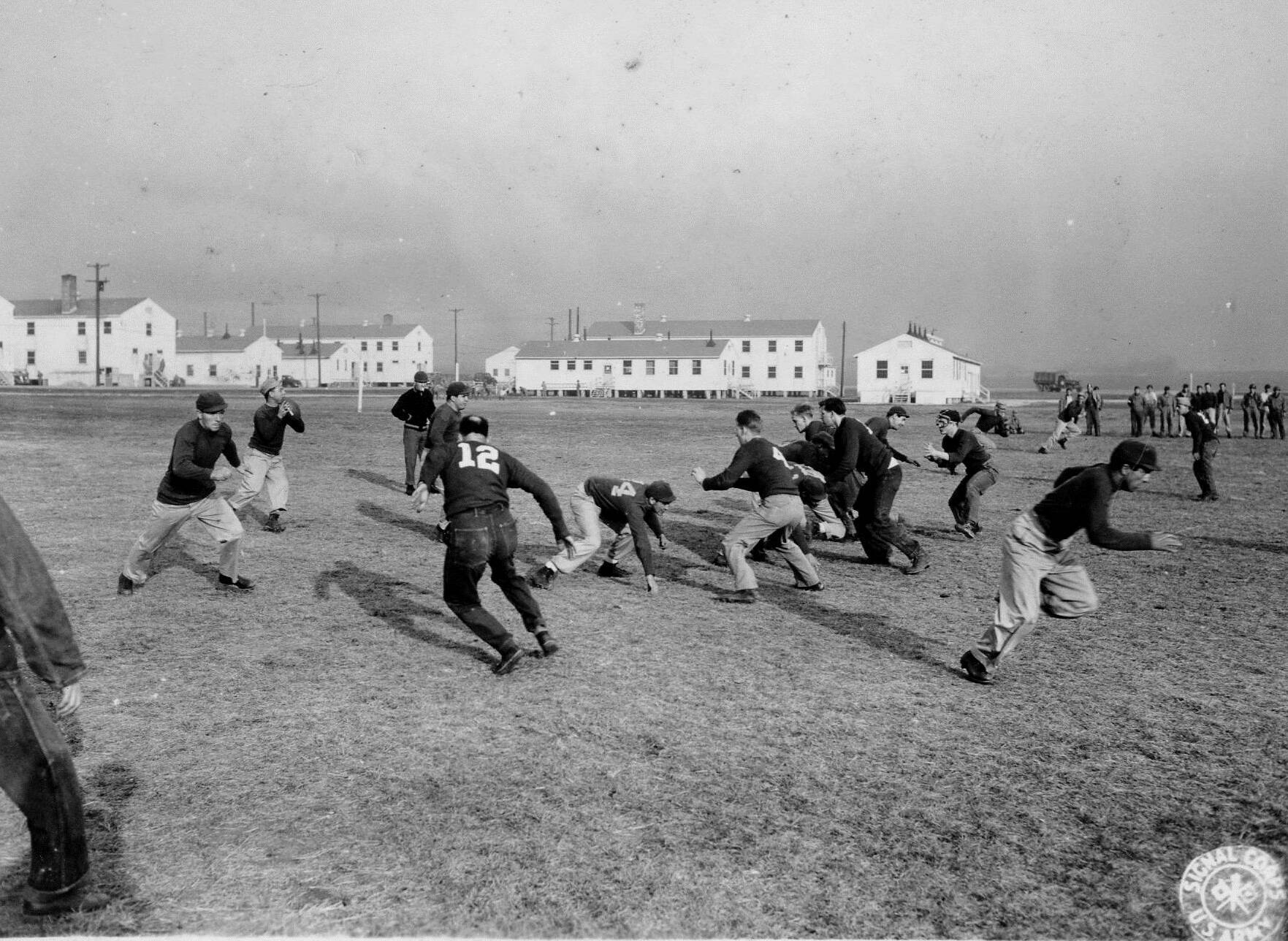
A game of touch football at Camp Atterbury, Indiana, November 19, 1943

Scoring and game timing are much different in touch football than its more organized counterpart. For simplicity, touchdowns are usually worth 1 point and no other scoring is counted (there are no extra point and field goal attempts). This scoring method does not allow for other scoring types such as safeties. In a much lesser-used variation, a touchdown is worth 6 points, and the player who scored the touchdown can earn a two-point conversion by progressing from the end zone in which they had just scored back to the opposite end zone without being touched. There is usually no game clock and the game ends when one opponent has reached 10 touchdowns (in the former convention) or 100 points (in a standard convention).

== Variable rules ==
=== Kickoff ===
Change of possession after scoring is often accompanied by rules determining where the ball is thrown from as opposed to actually kicking since throwing offers more control to players who are not playing on standard football fields. When the kickoff style is open to variance after each score, the desired rules are called out and whichever is heard first, is the accepted rule. When the rules are agreed on before the start of a game and are made to be steady throughout, they are referred to as Auto-. The most accepted Auto- rules are Half Court, In Hands--, a rule that gives advantages to both the kicking and receiving teams.

=== First touch ===
In games without a blitz count, they may use the first touch rule to control the action of the offensive team's current quarterback. When teams are even, a "shift" (hand-off) between two offensive players begins the play. It takes a touch from a defender assigned to the quarterback (the "first touch") to stop initial forward progress and determine where the ball will be thrown from. The assigned defender is stuck to the quarterback, unable to act as a pass defender or to hinder the quarterback's search of a receiver.

Depending on the group, first touch can refer to the quarterback's ability to run or walk after the shift. For example, one group may refer to first touch as the ability of the quarterback to run after the shift, get touched, and still throw the ball. Another group may use the rule to mean that the quarterback has the ability to walk or power walk forward, get touched, and throw. The first variation favors a game with many players, while the second may be best for games where there are not many players.

Another addition to this rule is the "two-man touch", which penalizes the defense for being unaware of their assignments and teammates by making all players who touch the active quarterback stick to the player, removing a defender from the field temporarily.

This rule is commonly and informally referred to "first taught", the result of players creating another past tense verb for "touch".

=== Hand touch ===
As the name suggests, this rule determines the number of hands that must land on an offensive player simultaneously to stop the play/first touch situation. One-hand touch is often used with younger players, as two-hand touch demands greater dexterity. When used against more mature players, one-hand touch puts more pressure on the offense to juke and misdirect the defense. A variant called "rough touch" is also sometimes used, in which the defensive player must place both hands on the ball carrier with sufficient force to lightly shove him in order to stop the play. This is somewhat subjective, but tends to reduce the frequency of disputed touches.

=== No/Half Court ===
In Half Court, the ball is kicked off at the halfway mark in the field. In No Half Court, the ball is expected to be thrown from the kicking team's goal line. Half Court is practical when playing on a long field, but it puts the kicking team closer and potentially limits the maneuverability of the receiving team. Half Court is preferred by kicking teams as it dramatically shortens the amount of space and time between the teams.

=== No/In Hands ===
In Hands means that the ball will be thrown to any specific person, usually at the kicker's discretion. No In Hands means that the ball will be thrown in the general area of the team, but without a target. In Hands saves the receiving team the trouble of chasing a bobbling ball, and is preferred.

=== First down ===
Rules on first downs vary depending on the playing group and field size. In shorter fields, it may be impractical or unnecessary to create landmarks which would reset the downs, as four downs should be all the time needed to go from one end to the other. Longer fields, however, may need a halfway marker which, when reached, would reset the downs. Multiple markers can be used in this way depending on the field length. As stated above, a number of completed passes may also result in a first down, if the teams desire it so. It is uncommon to see both length-based and pass-based rules in use simultaneously.

=== Extra points ===
Some games count touchdowns as 1 point each, but if traditional scoring is desired and no goal posts are available, teams have the option of using "automatic" extra points. After a touchdown (6 points), teams can choose whether to automatically earn an extra point (for 7 total), or risk the extra point and attempt a 2-point conversion (for 8 total).

=== Field goals ===
If traditional scoring is desired and no goal posts are available, teams can implement a "field goal zone" close to the endzone. Anytime a team is within this zone, they may elect to automatically score 3 points and kickoff to the other team. This gives teams a choice whether to risk going for the touchdown, or take the free points.

=== Safeties ===
If traditional scoring is used, teams score 2 points for a safety, and then receive the ball off of a free kick, but if simplified "1 point-per-touchdown" scoring is used, this creates a dilemma. Solutions are to score 1/2 point or 1 full point for the safety and receive the ball off of a free kick; or have the safety result in a "turnover" to the opposite team, with the ball placed near the goal line.

Used by organized tackle football teams during practice, touch football reduces the risk of injury and can be played safely by people of different athletic abilities and sizes.

== Touch football organizations ==
With the first edition published in 1983, the National Intramural and Recreational Sports Association maintains a rule book for flag and touch football collegiate play.

In 1988 the United States Flag & Touch Football League (USFTL) was established in Cleveland, Ohio.

== See also ==
- Flag football
- Street football (American)
- Touch (sport)
- Touch rugby
