= NFL Street =

2004 video game

- North American cover
- Developer: EA Tiburon
- Publisher: EA Sports BIG
- Platforms: PlayStation 2, GameCube, Xbox
- Release: NA: January 13, 2004; EU: January 30, 2004
- Genre: Sports
- Modes: Single-player, multiplayer

NFL Street is an American football video game developed by EA Tiburon and published by Electronic Arts under the EA Sports BIG label. It was released for the PlayStation 2, GameCube and Xbox on January 13, 2004. Barry Sanders of the Detroit Lions, Shannon Sharpe of the Denver Broncos, and Ricky Williams of the Miami Dolphins appear on the cover. The game was followed by NFL Street 2 and NFL Street 3.

== Gameplay ==
Similar to the Blitz series, NFL Street is seven-on-seven American football, modeled after street football. NFL players wear street clothing instead of helmets and uniforms, though players can wear football jerseys. Like other American football games, it utilizes basic football rules, but without fouls, penalties, or injuries, leading to more aggressive gameplay than its real-life model.

One major feature in the game is "style points", which the player can earn by successfully completing style moves, such as making a huge play or taunting the other team during the game. Gaining enough style points will earn the player a "Gamebreaker", which lasts for the entire drive. The Gamebreaker concept was adopted from NBA Street.

An offensive Gamebreaker allows the player to plow through defenders and easily score a touchdown. On defense, it allows the player to easily get through their opponents blockers, cause fumbles, and possibly create a turnover. While difficult, it is possible to cancel a Gamebreaker by stopping the opponent from scoring. Additionally a player's active Gamebreaker may be canceled if the opposing player activates their own Gamebreaker. In this situation, both Gamebreakers are canceled. It is also possible to stop a defensive Gamebreaker by running out of bounds.

=== Game modes ===
Quick Game – The player selects a team and scoring system (touchdowns or style points) and plays a quick game against either the computer or a friend.
Pickup Game – A Pickup Game is the same as a Quick Game, but instead of choosing a team, the players opponent create teams from a pool of around 40 NFL players, some of which are Legends. In game, the teams are referred as "Team One" and "Team Two". Regulation Pickup Games of NFL Street allow each team one redraft (also called a "Re") if one team believes the random assortment of players available in the draft is not up to par. However, if both teams have used their redraft, another redraft can be done if both teams dislike the draft.
NFL Challenge – This is the main mode in the game. The player creates a team, from logo to players' heights, and goes through a series of challenges against other teams, unlocking new football stadiums, teams, equipment, and development points for improving the team by completing various challenges
All NFL Pickup – This mode is unlocked by beating the NFL Challenge mode. The same features apply as in Pickup Game, but instead of a 40-player pool, the player may select from any of the players in the game, including Legends. The player may choose 1–2 players from any team except from the cheat code teams.

=== Rosters ===
The rosters are based on the 2003 NFL roster, with some earlier players as NFL Legends.

== Soundtrack ==
The original score was done by turntablist group the X-Ecutioners, along with several songs that were part of pre-album releases for other artists on the soundtrack.

== Reception ==
Reception

Aggregate score
Aggregator	Score		
Aggregator	GameCube	PS2	Xbox
Metacritic	81/100	80/100	81/100

Review scores
Publication	Score		
Publication	GameCube	PS2	Xbox
Electronic Gaming Monthly	8.5/10	8.5/10	8.5/10
Game Informer	7.75/10	7.75/10	7.75/10
GamePro	4/5	4/5	4/5
GameRevolution	B	B	B
GameSpot	7.8/10	7.9/10	7.8/10
GameSpy	4/5	4/5	4/5
GameZone	8.5/10	9.3/10	8.6/10
IGN	9.1/10	9.2/10	9.2/10
Nintendo Power	4.5/5	N/A	N/A
Official U.S. PlayStation Magazine	N/A	4.5/5	N/A
Official Xbox Magazine (US)	N/A	N/A	8.3/10
The Cincinnati Enquirer	2.5/5	2.5/5	2.5/5
Entertainment Weekly	B	B	B

By July 2006, the PlayStation 2 version of NFL Street had sold 950,000 copies and earned $37 million in the United States. Next Generation ranked it as the 58th highest-selling game launched for the PlayStation 2, Xbox or GameCube between January 2000 and July 2006 in that country. Combined console sales of NFL Street games released in the 2000s reached 2 million units in the United States by July 2006.

NFL Street received "favorable" reviews on all platforms according to video game review aggregator Metacritic. It received a runner-up position in GameSpot's 2004 "Best Alternative Sports Game" award category across all platforms, losing to Mario Power Tennis.

Maxim gave the game all five stars and said the player can "dispense with kicking and doodle-heavy playbooks, and deploy between-the-leg laterals and double reverses, plus a mess of excellent unsportsmanlike, showboating taunts." The Village Voice gave the Xbox version a score of nine out of ten and said, "In the surprisingly good single-player "NFL Challenge" mode, you earn points to build a franchise, choosing everything from the players' mutated genes (10 attributes, plus size) to their speed-enhancing sneakers. 'Cause it ain't all about the steroids." However, Entertainment Weekly gave the game a B and said, "This pigskin sim fumbles by forcing players to run their amateur team against the pros in order to unlock better fields and additional players – a clear case of unnecessary roughness." The Cincinnati Enquirer gave it two-and-a-half stars out of five and called it "a fun, simplistic diversion, especially with a group of friends. However, once you've seen all the style moves it doesn't have the staying power of much deeper football games like EA's own Madden NFL 2004."

David Leonard of PopMatters critiqued the game's depiction of African-American men, comparing the "emphasis on savagery, violence and animalistic features" to those used in the controversial first-person shooter Ethnic Cleansing.
