= Black Tape =

Studio album by The Explosion
- Released: October 15, 2004
- Genres: Punk rock, pop punk, skate punk, melodic hardcore
- Length: 36:59
- Label: Virgin

The Explosion chronology
Sick of Modern Art (2003)	Black Tape (2004)	Red Tape (2004)

Singles from Black Tape
- 1. "Here I Am" Released: June 7, 2005; 2. "No Revolution" Released: August 2, 2005

Professional ratings
Review scores
Source	Rating
AllMusic	4/5 stars
Music Box	2.5/5 stars
Punknews.org	2.5/5 stars

Black Tape is the second album from The Explosion. It was released in the United States on October 15, 2004, on Virgin Records. The band released a music video for the singles "Here I Am" and "No Revolution".

"No Revolution" was featured in the video games NFL Street 2 and Midnight Club 3: Dub Edition. "Here I Am" was included in the soundtracks for Burnout 3: Takedown and Tony Hawk's Underground 2, while an instrumental was included in Cars.

== Track listing ==
1. "Deliver Us" – 1:42
2. "Filthy Insane" – 3:08
3. "Here I Am" – 2:47
4. "I Know" – 3:34
5. "We All Fall Down" – 2:57
6. "Mothers Cry" – 3:14
7. "Atrocity" – 3:20
8. "Go Blank" – 3:21
9. "No Revolution" – 2:46
10. "Heavyweight" – 3:24
11. "Grace" – 3:40
12. "Hollywood Sign" – 3:06

=== Japanese bonus tracks ===
1. "Black Tuesday"
2. "Jeffrey Lee"
