= Acupuncture and Massage College =

College in Miami, Florida, United States

- Motto: To Heal with Kindness
- Type: Private
- Established: 1983
- Founder: Dr.Richard Brown
- President: Christina Wood
- Location: Miami, Florida, United States; 25.68°N 80.36°W
- Website: www.amcollege.edu

Acupuncture and Massage College was a nationally-accredited, private for-profit university in Miami, Florida that specialized in Oriental medicine. The college was founded in 1983 and was the first acupuncture school in Florida. The university ceased operations on September 2, 2024.

== History ==
Acupuncture and Massage (AMC) was founded in 1983 as the Acupressure-Acupuncture Institute. In 2000, the school was re-named the Southeast Institute of Oriental Medicine (SEIOM). In 2003, SEIOM was granted college status, and the name was changed again to Acupuncture and Massage College.

== Academics ==
Acupuncture and Massage College was nationally-accredited by the Accrediting Commission of Career Schools and Colleges (ACCSC). It awarded a Master's degree in Oriental medicine, which provided education and clinical training in Traditional Chinese Medicine, including acupuncture, Chinese herbs, and Bodywork therapy. The Master's degree was accredited by ACAOM and was approved by the State of Florida Board of Acupuncture. The college also awarded a professional certification in Massage Therapy, which was approved by the State of Florida Board of Massage Therapy.

== Notable alumni ==
Ricky Williams
