= Madden NFL 06 =

2005 video game

- Cover art with Donovan McNabb
- Developers: EA Tiburon (Note: Ported to Windows by Budcat Creations); Exient Entertainment (GBA, DS); Floodgate Entertainment (Mobile 3D) (Note: Sole developer of Palm and Pocket PC versions; BREW version co-developed alongside Finite Monkeys.); Sandcastle Studios (Mobile 2D)
- Publisher: EA Sports
- Series: Madden NFL
- Platforms: PlayStation 2 GameCube; Xbox; Xbox 360; Windows; PlayStation Portable; Game Boy Advance; Nintendo DS; Mobile phone (Note: 3D version released for Palm OS and Windows Mobile; 2D and 3D versions released for BREW.)
- Release: August 9, 2005: Game Boy Advance, GameCube, Nintendo DS, PS2, Xbox; NA: August 9, 2005; AU: September 12, 2005; EU: September 16, 2005 (GC, PS2, Xbox); EU: September 30, 2005 (DS) Mobile; NA: August 9, 2005 Windows; NA: August 17, 2005; AU: August 25, 2005; EU: September 23, 2005 PlayStation Portable; NA: September 20, 2005; EU: December 16, 2005; AU: December 19, 2005 Xbox 360; NA: November 15, 2005; EU: December 2, 2005; AU: March 23, 2006 Mobile (2D); NA: November 18, 2005
- Genre: Sports
- Modes: Single-player, multiplayer

Madden NFL 06 is an American football video game released in 2005. It is the 16th installment of the Madden NFL series by EA Sports, named for color commentator John Madden. It is the first Madden game for the PlayStation Portable and Xbox 360 and was a launch game for the Xbox 360. Philadelphia Eagles quarterback Donovan McNabb is featured on the cover.

== Gameplay ==
Madden 06 introduces the Superstar mode, which allows the player to create and take control of an NFL player from his rookie year all the way to retirement. An athlete can be created by evaluating pairs of judging, based on their IQs, occupations, and hobbies, whether their child would excel in the NFL or by importing a player. Superstar mode is essentially Madden's Franchise mode seen through the eyes of this athlete. Rather than manage the team's front office, the player manages the career of his athlete.

It also features the new QB Vision Control. A cone, appearing as a spotlight emitting from the quarterback, simulates his field of vision. To make an accurate pass, the quarterback must have his intended receiver in his field of vision. Passing to a receiver not in the cone reduces pass accuracy significantly. The size of the quarterback's vision cone is directly correlated to his Awareness rating.

However, this has been criticized by many fans because it may resemble some bias that EA Sports and the Madden series itself is frequently accused of. A player can shift the vision cone with the right analog stick, or focus the cone on a specific receiver by holding a shoulder button and pressing the button assigned to that receiver. This change also met with the poor reception. Although the passing system adds a whole new level of realism, it also makes the game significantly more difficult for players playing teams with less-aware quarterbacks. These players will be forced to improve their reflexes in order to be competitive, as throwing outside the QB vision cone results in a very weak and inaccurate pass.

Accompanying QB Vision is Precision Passing. Pressing the directional button or left analog stick in a certain direction as the quarterback passes the ball will make the throw over the receiver's head, behind him, in front of him, or at his knees.

The most critically acclaimed new feature is the highlight stick, which functions like an offensive version of the hit stick from the previous year. When running the football, a player can push forward the right analog stick to run over the defender, at the cost of risking a potential fumble. Several features from previous titles return such as hot routes, playmaker features, and franchise features.

Madden NFL 06 also features online multiplayer. The online servers were shut down on September 1, 2007.

The soundtrack for Madden NFL 06 featured EA Trax integration that includes Avenged Sevenfold, Tech N9ne, Memphis Bleek, Slim Thug, Disturbed, Foo Fighters, Godsmack and many more hip hop/rock artists.

== Compatibility ==
The player can import their created player from Own The City mode in NFL Street 2 into the game's Superstar mode after finishing the game mode. The player starts as an 18-year-old rookie in NFL Superstar mode and attributes are given by how development points were distributed in NFL Street 2. Also, draft classes from NCAA Football 06 could be imported to franchise mode. If the player has a save file from Madden NFL 06, they can unlock the Madden Challenge Bus in Burnout Revenge; a gameplay demo of Revenge is also available on the PlayStation 2 and Xbox versions of the game.

== Reception ==
Reception

Aggregate scores
Aggregator	Score							
Aggregator	DS	GBA	GameCube	PC	PS2	PSP	Xbox	Xbox 360
GameRankings	63.22%	69%	83.07%	76.61%	85.26%	74.14%	84.11%	74.55%
Metacritic	66/100	71/100	86/100	78/100	88/100	75/100	86/100	74/100

Review scores
Publication	Score							
Publication	DS	GBA	GameCube	PC	PS2	PSP	Xbox	Xbox 360
Electronic Gaming Monthly	N/A	N/A	9/10	N/A	9/10	7.67/10	9/10	7.83/10
Game Informer	5/10	N/A	9/10	N/A	9/10	8.5/10	9/10	7.75/10
GamePro	N/A	N/A	4.5/5	N/A	5/5	1.5/5	5/5	4/5
GameRevolution	N/A	N/A	B+	N/A	B+	B−	B+	C+
GameSpot	7.4/10	7.3/10	8.1/10	7.8/10	8.2/10	7.9/10	8.2/10	7.4/10
GameSpy	N/A	N/A	4/5	4/5	4.5/5	3.5/5	4.5/5	4/5
GameTrailers	N/A	N/A	8/10	8/10	8/10	N/A	8/10	7.2/10
GameZone	7.5/10	6.8/10	8.7/10	8.8/10	8.8/10	8.8/10	9/10	7.9/10
IGN	6/10	7.8/10	8.5/10	8.8/10	8.8/10	8.5/10	8.8/10	8/10
Nintendo Power	8/10	7/10	9/10	N/A	N/A	N/A	N/A	N/A
Official U.S. PlayStation Magazine	N/A	N/A	N/A	N/A	4.5/5	3.5/5	N/A	N/A
Official Xbox Magazine (US)	N/A	N/A	N/A	N/A	N/A	N/A	8/10	7/10
PC Gamer (US)	N/A	N/A	N/A	67%	N/A	N/A	N/A	N/A
Detroit Free Press	N/A	N/A	N/A	N/A	4/4	N/A	N/A	N/A
Maxim	N/A	N/A	10/10	N/A	10/10	N/A	10/10	N/A

The game was met with very positive to mixed reception. GameRankings and Metacritic gave it a score of 85.26% and 88 out of 100 for the PlayStation 2 version; 84.11% and 86 out of 100 for the Xbox version; 83.07% and 86 out of 100 for the GameCube version; 76.61% and 78 out of 100 for the PC version; 74.55% and 74 out of 100 for the Xbox 360 version; 74.14% and 75 out of 100 for the PSP version; 69% and 71 out of 100 for the Game Boy Advance version; 66.67% for the Mobile version; and 63.22% and 66 out of 100 for the DS version.

Fans and EA developers both view Madden NFL 06 as "the undisputed lemon of the franchise", because of the concurrent shift from the Xbox and PlayStation 2 to the Xbox 360 and PlayStation 3. The passing cone was so unpopular that it disappeared in Madden NFL 09. Reviewers criticized the game's lack of new features and lackluster soundtrack (a recurring complaint), claiming the game plays very similarly to Madden NFL 2005 if the QB Vision cone is turned off. GameSpot gave the mobile version a score of 7 out of 10 and called it "a decent game of football with a solid statistical foundation. It breaks new ground for the franchise and promises future installments for football fans. However, this edition definitely shows EA's wireless inexperience and wasn't the stunner it should have been. In particular, the game's visuals are a disappointment. If you already have a V Cast phone, Madden 06 isn't a bad way to go. It's just not the killer app that forces an upgrade." Similarly, IGN gave the same version seven out of ten, saying that the game "was developed not internally, but by a development house called Finite Monkeys. And it ultimately feels like they were rushed to get this game on the decks by "Madden Tuesday." This is unfortunate, because I think a lot of people will download the game hoping to have a "Madden experience" on their handset, and just end up with an average football game, albeit one with above-average visuals and spoken commentary."

Madden NFL 06 was 2005's only NFL-Licensed football videogame, due to the 2004 deal between the NFL/NFLPA and Electronic Arts. The deal grants EA exclusive rights to the likenesses and names of all players, stadiums, logos, and jerseys. Electronic Arts also signed a long-term deal with ESPN, complicating the game's relationship to its titular announcer. In early 2006, Madden—at the time under contract as color commentator for ABC's Monday Night Football—moved to NBC to join their Sunday night NFL coverage beginning in the 2006 season. The Xbox 360 version of Madden 06 features neither Al Michaels nor Madden in the announcing booth. Some positives with the Xbox 360 version were the right stick being used for the QB Vision feature and different songs from the original.

=== Sales ===
In the United States, the game's PlayStation Portable version sold 590,000 copies and earned $28 million by August 2006. During the period between January 2000 and August 2006, it was the 48th highest-selling game launched for the Game Boy Advance, Nintendo DS or PlayStation Portable in that country. The game sold more than 6 million copies.

=== Awards ===
E3 2005 Game Critics Awards: Best Sports Game
