= Bury Me Standing =

Studio album by The Explosion
- Released: February 14, 2012
- Recorded: 2006
- Genre: Punk rock, pop punk
- Length: 29:38
- Label: Chunksaah

The Explosion chronology
Red Tape (2005)	Bury Me Standing (2012)

Bury Me Standing is the third and final full-length album from The Explosion. The album was scheduled to be released on May 13, 2008 on Paper + Plastick records only to never be released. Although, a digital version of the album had been leaked online.

As of December 9, 2011, it was revealed that this will finally have a proper release through Chunksaah Records, in early 2012. Copies of the vinyl version were available at the 2011 Bouncing Souls "Home For The Holidays Shows" and were special variants made just for the shows.

The album was released via iTunes and vinyl on February 14, 2012.

== Track listing ==
No.	Title	Length
1.	"It Ain't Right"	2:26
2.	"Save Us"	3:10
3.	"Image of a Son"	3:29
4.	"KDZ Radio"	1:44
5.	"NYCD"	4:49
6.	"Rally Around"	2:54
7.	"All the Best"	3:24
8.	"Die by My Side"	3:28
9.	"Yesterday's Papers"	3:23
10.	"Warning"	1:58
Total length:		28:45

Vinyl edition bonus tracks
No.	Title	Length
11.	"Dav's Big Top"	0:56
