= The Explosion =

American punk rock band

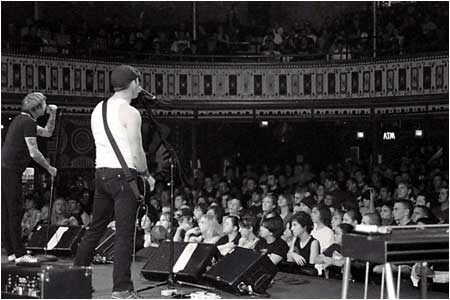
- The Explosion performing at the Tabernacle in Atlanta, Georgia, October 2004

Background information
- Origin: Boston, Massachusetts, United States
- Genres: Punk rock, skate punk, melodic hardcore
- Years active: 1998–2007, 2011, 2014, 2016, 2019–present
- Labels: Jade Tree, Revelation, Tarantulas, Virgin, Chunksaah
- Members: Matt Hock; David Walsh; Damian Genuardi; Andrew Black; Chris Gonzalez
- Past members: Dan Colby; Sam Cave

The Explosion is an American punk rock band from Boston, Massachusetts. On February 13, 2007, the band announced that they had left Virgin Records, and on April 30, 2007, that they were to split up. On September 4, 2007, the band played their final show in New York though they have subsequently played multiple reunion shows.

== History ==
Matt Hock and Damian Genuardi met David Walsh through Rama Mayo, owner of indie label Big Wheel Recreation. They started the band in the fall of 1998, with Cave and Colby eventually joining later.

They pressed 250 copies of a demo before going on tour with Kid Dynamite. A roadie gave the demo to indie rock label Jade Tree Records, who signed the band and put out a self-titled EP containing all the demo tracks in 2000.

Their debut full-length album, Flash Flash Flash on Jade Tree, was released to glowing reviews. Spin Magazine named it as one of the best 20 albums of 2000, and later named the band one of the top-10 punk acts of 2001. The Explosion also came in second for "best local punk act" in the Boston Phoenix. They began touring the U.S. and Europe with the likes of Sick of it All, AFI (A Fire Inside), the Nerve Agents, Avail, Leatherface, US Bombs, Alkaline Trio, The Queers, Social Distortion, Tiger Army, The International Noise Conspiracy, Rocket From the Crypt and Joe Strummer and the Mescaleros. They were also featured on the 2001 and 2005 Warped Tours. The album's song Points West was featured in the PC version of the game True Crime: Streets of L.A.

However, they soon faced a problem. Genuardi's former straight edge hardcore band, In My Eyes, had been signed to Revelation Records. Revelation Records threatened to sue Genuardi if he was credited on any of The Explosion's records, believing that The Explosion's success with Jade Tree should belong to them. The Explosion settled the dispute by writing an EP for Revelation, sarcastically titled Steal This.

In 2003, they released an EP called Sick of Modern Art on their own label, Tarantulas Records.

Seven major labels soon became involved in a bidding war over The Explosion. They were eventually signed to Virgin Records, who distributed Sick of Modern Art. Their album Black Tape was recorded at Cider Mountain Recorders by C. Phillips and J. Hehn. It was released on Virgin in the United States on October 5, 2004, then on March 15 in the UK. Songs off this album were featured on several video games such as Tony Hawk's Underground and its sequel, Midnight Club 3: Dub Edition, and NFL Street 2.

On October 21, 2004, they performed live on Late Night with Conan O'Brien.

The Explosion finished recording their second Virgin Records effort in 2006, but it was left unreleased. In March 2008 it was announced that the record, titled Bury Me Standing, would be released on the new label Paper + Plastick. Once again, the album was not released. In December 2011 it was announced that Chunksaah Records, the label run by the band's friends The Bouncing Souls, would release the album on February 14, 2012.

On December 2, 2011, it was announced that the band would be doing a one-off performance with The Bouncing Souls on December 28, 2011, in Asbury Park, New Jersey, as part of the Souls' fifth annual "Home For The Holidays" shows.

On April 1, 2014, an appearance at the annual This Is Hardcore Festival in Philadelphia was announced for the band.

The band performed their third reunion show at Asbury Park, New Jersey on July 29, 2016.

On May 8, 2019 Bad Religion announced The Explosion would be supporting them on their next tour.

== Members ==
=== Final line-up ===
- Matt Hock - vocals (1998–2007) (Currently playing in Space Cadet)
- David Walsh - guitar (1998–2007) (Currently playing guitar with The Loved Ones and Space Cadet)
- Damian Genuardi - bass (1998–2007) (Currently playing bass with My Best Fiend)
- Andrew Black - drums (2000–2007) (Currently playing drums with Domino Team and Team Vibes)
- Christopher Gonzalez - guitar (2005–2007) (Currently playing bass with The Loved Ones, and vocals and guitar for Team Vibes)

=== Earlier members ===
- Sam Cave - guitar (1999–2004)
- Dan Colby - drums (1998–2000)

== Discography ==
=== Studio albums ===
- Flash Flash Flash (July 18, 2000 Jade Tree)
- Black Tape (October 4, 2004 Virgin Records)
- Bury Me Standing (May 13, 2008) [Originally - Paper Plastick Records) (Released: February 14, 2012 Chunksaah Records)

=== Live albums ===
- Live in Boston - (2005 Virgin Records) Live from the Troubadour - (2005 Tarantulas) Only available in DIW Magazine No. 20. Hand numbered to 1000

=== EPs ===
- The Explosion (April 2000 Jade Tree)
- Steal This (October 31, 2000 Revelation)
- Sick of Modern Art (April 22, 2003 Tarantulas)
- Red Tape (January 1, 2005 Tarantulas)

=== Singles ===
Year	Song	Chart positions		Album
Year	Song	US Modern Rock	UK Singles Chart	Album
2004	"Here I Am"	37	75	Black Tape
2005	"No Revolution"	—	107	Black Tape

=== Music videos ===
- "Here I Am" (2004)
- "No Revolution" (2005)

=== Compilation albums ===
- Tarantulas 2003 Sampler (April 22, 2003)
- 2005 KROQ New Music (November 9, 2004 KROQ)

=== Soundtracks ===
Title	Year	Album	Game
"No Revolution"	2003	Flash Flash Flash	Tony Hawk's Underground
"Here I Am"	2004	Black Tape	Burnout 3: Takedown
"Here I Am"	2004	Black Tape	Tony Hawk's Underground 2
"No Revolution"	2004	Black Tape	NFL Street 2
"No Revolution"	2005	Black Tape	Midnight Club 3: DUB Edition
"Here I Am"	2006	Black Tape	Cars
