= Here I Am (The Explosion song) =

Single by The Explosion

from the album Black Tape
- Released: June 7, 2005
- Genre: Pop punk
- Length: 2:47
- Label: Virgin Records
- Songwriters: Matt Hock, David Walsh, Sam Cave, Damian Genuardi, Andrew Black

The Explosion singles chronology
"Here I Am" (2005)	"No Revolution" (2005)

Audio
- "Here I Am" on YouTube

"Here I Am" is a single by the band The Explosion, released as the first single from their 2004 album Black Tape on June 7, 2005. The music video features Smith Puget, brother of Jade Puget of the band AFI. The song reached the 37th position in the US chart and 71st in the UK single album list. The song has been featured in the soundtracks of the video games Burnout 3: Takedown and Tony Hawk's Underground 2, while an instrumental version is available in the Cars game.

== Track listing ==
1. "Here I Am"

=== CD and Vinyl release ===
1. "Here I Am"
2. "Black Tuesday"
3. "Jeffrey Lee"
4. "Here I Am" (video)
