= The Explosion (EP) =

EP by The Explosion
- Released: 2000
- Genre: Punk rock
- Length: 12:55
- Label: Jade Tree

The Explosion chronology
The Explosion (EP) (2000)	Flash Flash Flash (2000)

The Explosion is the self-titled debut EP from The Explosion. It was released in 2000 on Jade Tree Records. All the tracks featured were originally part of a demo sold on The Explosion's tour with Kid Dynamite.

== Track listing ==
1. "These Times"
2. "Hero"
3. "Out Tonight"
4. "Youth Explosion"
5. "Channels"
6. "Simple Lives"
