= No Revolution =

Single by The Explosion

from the album Black Tape
- Released: August 2, 2005
- Genre: Punk rock
- Length: 2:46
- Label: Virgin Records
- Songwriter(s): Matt Hock, David Walsh, Sam Cave, Damian Genuardi, Andrew Black

The Explosion singles chronology
"Here I Am" (2005)	"No Revolution" (2005)

"No Revolution" is a single by the band The Explosion, released as the second single from their 2004 album Black Tape on August 2, 2005.

The song charted in the United Kingdom, peaking at No. 71 in the Physical Singles chart and No. 5 in the Rock & Metal Singles chart. Additionally, it has been featured in the soundtracks of the Tony Hawk's Underground in its original Flash Flash Flash version, and NFL Street 2 and Midnight Club 3: DUB Edition in its Black Tape version.

== Track listing ==
1. "No Revolution"

=== CD release version ===
1. "No Revolution"
2. "Here I Am" (live)
3. "Gun"
