= Steal This =

EP by The Explosion
- Released: October 31, 2000
- Genre: Punk rock
- Length: 8:57
- Label: Revelation

The Explosion chronology
Flash Flash Flash (2000)	Steal This (2000)	Sick of Modern Art (2003)

Professional ratings
Review scores
Source	Rating
Allmusic	link

Steal This is an EP by The Explosion. It was released in 2000 on Revelation Records. Its title is a sarcastic jab at the legal troubles resulting in the EP's recording.

The Explosion's bassist, Damian Genuardi, had played in straight edge hardcore band In My Eyes before founding The Explosion in 1998. In My Eyes were signed to Revelation. When Revelation found out about The Explosion's success on Jade Tree Records, they threatened to sue Genaurdi if he was credited on any of The Explosion's records. They believed that The Explosion's success with Jade Tree should belong to them. The Explosion settled the dispute by writing this EP while on the road. As a result of its circumstances, it is not considered The Explosion's best work.

== Track listing ==
1. "Dotted Lines"
2. "Blue"
3. "Safety Belt"
4. "E.X.P.L.O.S.I.O.N."
5. "Turnaround"
