= Street football (American) =

Amateur gridiron football

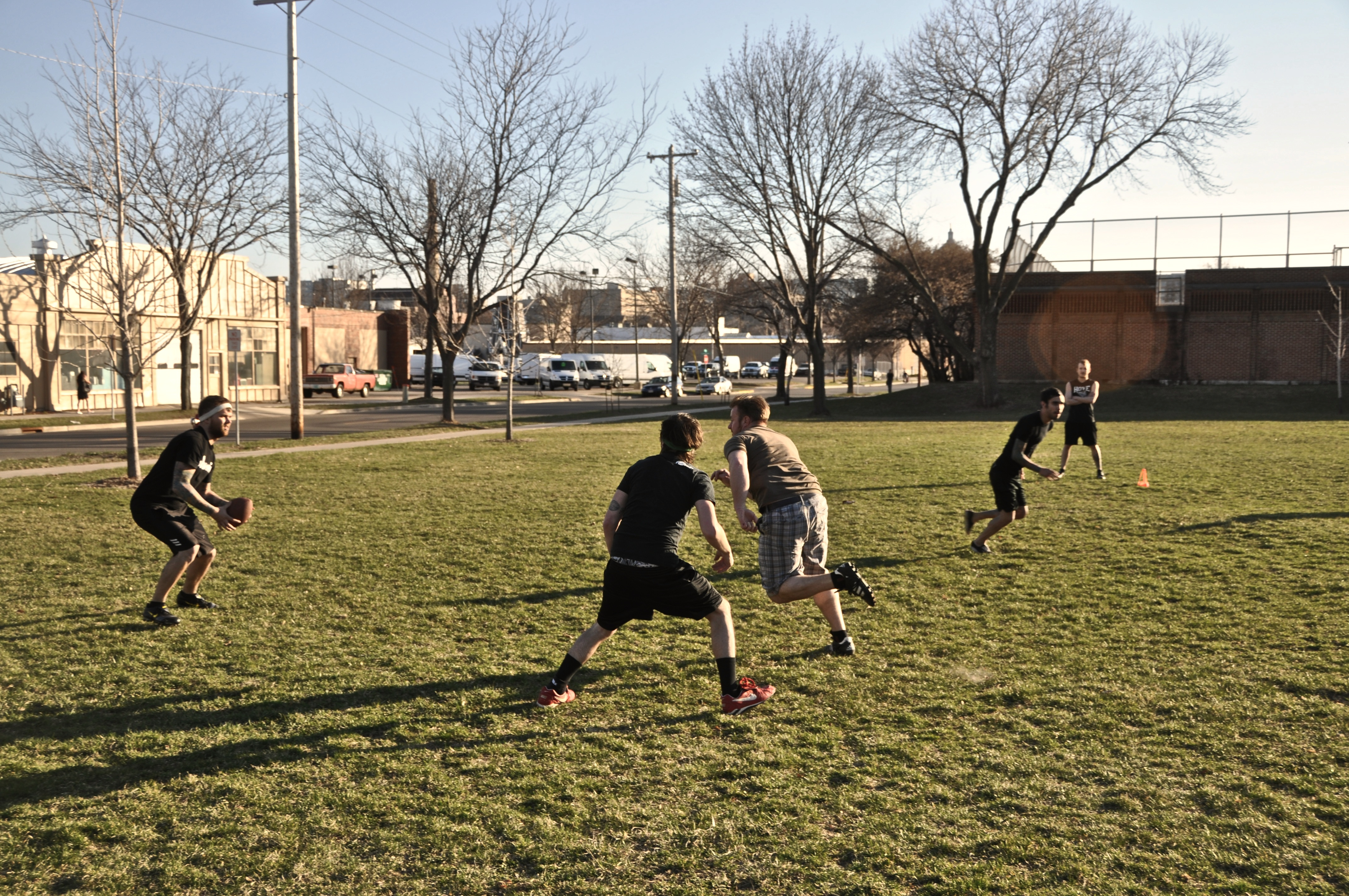
Several people playing backyard American football

Street football, also known as backyard football or sandlot football, is an amateur variant of American football primarily played informally by youth. It features far less equipment and fewer rules than its counterparts and, unlike the similar touch football, features full tackling. (Note: Some variants specify "wrap" tackling, in which the player with the ball does not need to be taken to the ground to be considered down.)

== Main rules ==
An organized version has seven players to a side, such as in the American 7's Football league (A7FL), while other versions have six players on offense and seven on defense. Such organization is rare, however, as players per side can range from as few as one to dozens. Teams are typically assembled from scratch, with participants playing both offense and defense. Most forms of backyard or street football use ad hoc house rules that vary from location to location and/or game to game. Rules vary greatly across neighborhoods and are customarily set before each game. Penalties are rare and are usually only enforced in the most egregious cases, such as serious injuries or blatant pass interference. Most games use the honor system in lieu of a referee and/or an officiating crew. The game ends when a pre-determined number of touchdowns or points has been scored, or an arbitrary time is reached (for instance, dusk or the start of school).

=== Field of play ===
Games are played on fields generally ranging from as short as 10 to as large as 50 yards, with the occasional game being played on a full-size regulation 100 yard field such as in the A7FL. Generally, the larger the field, the more players that can be incorporated into the game. The A7FL plays on a full-size regulation field in regards to length, but the width of the field is narrowed, from 53 yards to 40 yards, in order to accommodate fewer players on the field.

=== Downs and scoring ===
As in regular American football, each team usually has four downs per series. In order to achieve a series of downs, backyard football requires the team with the ball to complete two passes or reach a certain point on the field. Few games include enough people, or the proper equipment, to run a chain crew to maintain the 10 yards familiar in most organized leagues. These structures encourage passing plays over running, as does the usual lack of an offensive line and defensive line. Popular passing plays include going long, the hook, the hook and go, and the down and out. A well-practiced pump fake by the quarterback often accompanies the hook and go.

The use of a center is optional, depending on the rules set forth, and other ways to start the play (e.g. the quarterback picking up the ball directly, or holding the ball out prior to starting play, then pulling it back to begin) are often used in lieu of a snap. When a center is used, that player is an eligible receiver. Also, the "center sneak"—wherein the center snaps the ball to touch the quarterback's hands, but retains possession and then rushes—is legal. Most teams that use a line opt for three down linemen, a center and two guards. Some organizations that don't require the center to snap the ball to the quarterback use two linemen.

Play continues until there is a turnover (usually an interception), a turnover on downs (e.g. the offense fails to complete two passes in four downs), or the team on offense scores a touchdown. Touchdowns are worth one, six, or seven points depending on the rules set out before the game. In some instances, depending on factors such as the size of the field, more downs are used or teams are given a certain number of downs to score. For instance, a team might be given eight tries to score a touchdown. Also, the length of a first down may differ due to the lack of a pass rush. For instance, a team may have to advance 15 or 20 yards to get a first down.

=== Kicking ===
To start a game, the two teams organize on opposite sides of the field for the kickoff. Because of skill, field size and other issues, this is usually not a kickoff, but rather a "punt-off" or a "throw-off". Many versions skip this process and start the offense at a certain point, similar to that following a touchback in organized leagues.

Field goals and extra point kicks are nonexistent, as streets and backyards have no goal posts. In games played on regulation fields, these kicks can be attempted, but only in certain scoring systems.

Punts can happen frequently, usually during situations where the offensive team cannot earn a first down (for example, in games played using a "two completions in four downs" rule to earn a first down, reaching fourth down with zero completions).

In the event a touchdown is scored, the team on offense will normally stay in the end zone in which they had just scored and the other team will go into the main field and field the subsequent kickoff (or variant thereof). This convention is sometimes known as "losers walk". Thus, until an interception or turnover on downs occurs, both teams defend and attempt to score on the same end zone.

=== Rushing ===
There can be a rush on the quarterback (commonly called a blitz in this context) depending on the rules set out before the game. Usually, if rushes are allowed, one of two rules is commonly applied:

- Blitz count — the defense must count out loud to a certain number before they can rush. It is also called "Mississippi rush" as the blitzing player must insert the word "Mississippi" between numbers (e.g. one Mississippi, two Mississippi, etc.) to prevent the defense from counting rapidly, which would give the quarterback little to no time to attempt a pass. Alternate counting words include "apple" and "banana". In Canada, the word "steamboat" is generally used.
- Call rush — the defense must signify their intent to rush by calling out "blitz" in a loud voice before the offense snaps the ball. Doing so, however, allows the quarterback to get out of the pocket and run without having to pass or hand off the ball. In some variants, the quarterback can call out "shotgun" before the snap, which precludes the quarterback from running but requires the defense to delay (by counting to a certain number, as above) before they can rush.

The above methods may be combined or adapted, depending on local rules.

=== Conversions ===
Two-point conversions usually are not applied, but if they are, there are several conversion systems, including single-point, pass-run, yardage, and runback. The single-point is the simplest, in which any successful conversion is worth one point following a touchdown valued at six (or sometimes seven) points. Pass-run is used in some youth leagues and awards two points for a pass and one point for a run. Usually, all pass-run conversions are attempted from the one- or two-yard line. Another conversion system is the yardage system, similar to that used in the XFL playoffs, the Lingerie Football League, and the Stars Football League. In the yardage system, one-point conversions are attempted from the one- or five-yard line, and two-point conversions are attempted from the two- or ten-yard line. The runback is the most rare of the conversion rules, and is most often implemented in one-on-one games. In this version, the play does not end once the ball crosses the goal line; instead, the player with the ball must change direction and advance it all the way back to the other end zone for two points.

== Leagues ==
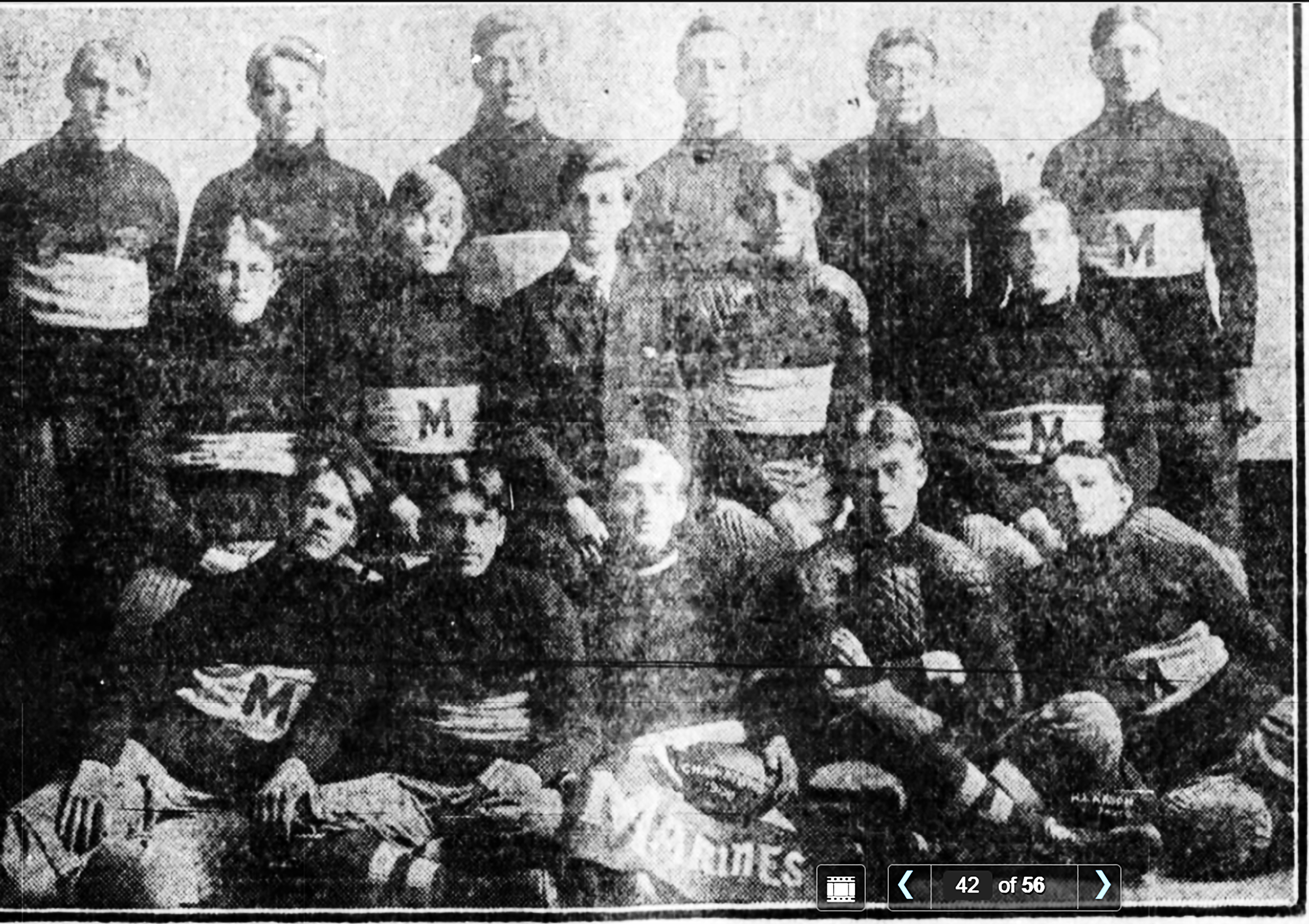
The Minneapolis Marines sandlot football team of 1908

Street football is usually played as a pick-up game and has very little organization, but an organized "sandlot" football has been around since the early 20th century. In 1908, a circuit was launched in Rochester, New York, after the city banned high school football in its schools. The circuit produced a team known as the Rochester Jeffersons, who later joined the National Football League (NFL) as a charter member in 1920, as well as several other teams that lasted into the 1930s. Minneapolis, too, had a vibrant sandlot league, and in 1905 the Minneapolis Marines first played in the city's sandlots; the Marines joined the NFL in 1921.

== In video games ==
Street football has been used as the basis for two very different video games. EA Sports's NFL Street is a rules-light version of football played by NFL stars, similar to the Blitz series created by Midway Games. Atari's Backyard Football series, on the other hand, is a more kid-friendly game with players including child versions of NFL stars.
