= NFL Street 3 =

- Cover art featuring Chad Johnson
- Developers: Buzz Monkey Software, EA Tiburon
- Publisher: EA Sports BIG
- Platforms: PlayStation 2, PlayStation Portable
- Release: NA: November 14, 2006; AU: February 1, 2007; EU: February 2, 2007
- Genre: Sports
- Modes: Single-player, multiplayer

NFL Street 3 is the third installment of the NFL Street series, released in November 2006 for the PlayStation 2 and PlayStation Portable consoles. This installment features more game modes and unlockable features than previous versions. Chad Johnson of the Cincinnati Bengals appears on the cover and was the official spokesperson of the game.

== Reception ==
Reception

Aggregate score
Aggregator	Score	
Aggregator	PS2	PSP
Metacritic	70/100	68/100

Review scores
Publication	Score	
Publication	PS2	PSP
1Up.com	B−	C
Electronic Gaming Monthly	6.67/10	N/A
Eurogamer	6/10	N/A
Game Informer	7/10	N/A
GamePro	3.5/5	N/A
GameSpot	6.9/10	6.9/10
GameSpy	2/5	3/5
GameZone	8.4/10	8/10
IGN	8/10	7.3/10
PlayStation: The Official Magazine	8/10	N/A

The game received "average" reviews, according to video game review aggregator Metacritic.

=== Awards ===
- Winner for Best Alternative Sports Game of 2006 for PlayStation 2 from IGN.
