= NFL Street 2 =

2004 video game

- North American cover
- Developer: EA Tiburon
- Publisher: EA Sports BIG
- Platforms: GameCube, PlayStation 2, Xbox, PlayStation Portable
- Release: GameCube, PS2, Xbox: NA: December 26, 2004; EU: January 28, 2005; PlayStation Portable: NA: March 24, 2005; EU: September 1, 2005
- Genre: Sports
- Modes: Single-player, multiplayer

NFL Street 2 is an American football video game developed by EA Tiburon and published by Electronic Arts under the EA Sports BIG label. It was originally released for the PlayStation 2, GameCube and Xbox on December 26, 2004. It features then-New York Giants tight end Jeremy Shockey and rapper Xzibit on the cover. The game is compatible with Madden NFL 06, as players can import their Own The City players to it. The game's compatibility also extends to other EA games like Need for Speed: Underground 2, SSX 3, Madden NFL 2005, NCAA Football 2005, NFL Street, GoldenEye: Rogue Agent, NBA Live 2005, and NBA Street Vol. 2, where if players have these games on their memory cards (or Xbox hard drive), they can earn 25,000 points in the game.

It was ported to the PlayStation Portable in 2005 under the name NFL Street 2 Unleashed.

== Gameplay ==
One of the new features in NFL Street 2 is the addition of the Gamebreaker 2. The player first has to acquire 100,000 style points to unlock a gamebreaker and then without using their gamebreaker, acquire the same number of style points again. When called at the line of scrimmage, A cutscene occurs in which on defense, the defense stylishly gets the ball back while on offense, the offense stylishly gets over the line of scrimmage. After the cutscene, the player enters a "god mode" in which he has unlimited turbo and will break all of his tackles.

The game also features Running Moves. Some of the running moves are the juke, the spin, the wall move, the wall juke, the stiff arm and the hurdle. These moves give the player style points.

Own The City mode is the newest mode of NFL Street II, the player must create a character and win all of the street games in Bay City. The player must play pick-up games to recruit talent for a team. The pick-up games are made up of randomly generated players. As the game progresses, the player will need to find better talent. If the player is successful they will face Xzibit and his team of NFL stars; upon beating his team, the player is invited to a tournament featuring NFL players. When the player completes Own The City mode, the created player can be imported to Superstar mode in Madden NFL 2006, another successful football title, or can be imported to the NFL Challenge mode. The created player may also be played as in any of the Street Events in which players are selected as individuals instead of as a team (Crush the Carrier, Jump Ball Battle, Open Field Showdown).

NFL Challenge is the official mode of the NFL Street series. The player must build up a team in 150 days to face the NFL Stars by completing challenges, such as scoring 250,000 style points on the Dallas Cowboys. Winning the challenges gives the player development points to spend on the players but also at the expense of days. When 5 days remain, a tournament opens up and the player's team must win the tournament to complete NFL Challenge (An alternative is to beat Team Xzibit in Own The City Mode). If the player advances into the final round, they face the NFL Legends, a team of NFL stars from the 1970s, 80s and 90s. If they win they unlock the team.

The teams feature 17 players on the 32 NFL teams from the 2004 NFL season, and the rosters are accurate as of November 2004.

== Soundtrack ==
The soundtrack is a mix of hip hop and alternative rock. Initially released to mixed reception, due to perceived lack of consistency in song selection, it went on to receive accolades such as being called "one of the greatest hip hop video game soundtracks of all time", and "one of the best EA Sports BIG soundtracks".

NFL Street 2 Soundtrack
Artist	Song
Acceptance	"In Too Far"
Acidtone	"Scarred"
Bishop Lamont	"I'm A Soldier"
Drowning Pool	Step Up
M.O.P.	"Put It In The Air"
M.O.P.	"Ground Zero"
Mase ft. P. Diddy	"Breathe, Stretch, Shake"
Nas	"Disciple"
No Warning	"Breeding Insanity"
Papa Roach	"Stop Looking Start Seeing"
Planet Asia	"Move"
Red Tape	"Damage Control"
Rock	"I Am Rock"
Royce da 5'9"	"No Way to Stop Me"
Sum 41	"No Reason"
The Exies	"Slow Drain"
The Explosion	"No Revolution"
Triple Seis	"Pray For Me"
Xzibit ft. Keri Hilson	"Hey Now (Mean Muggin)"
Ying Yang Twins ft. Homebwoi	Halftime
Yung Wun ft. DMX, Lil' Flip, David Banner	Tear It Up

== Reception ==
Reception

Aggregate score
Aggregator	Score			
Aggregator	GameCube	PS2	PSP	Xbox
Metacritic	77/100	77/100	73/100	78/100

Review scores
Publication	Score			
Publication	GameCube	PS2	PSP	Xbox
Electronic Gaming Monthly	8.5/10	8.5/10	8/10	8.5/10
Game Informer	7.5/10	7.5/10	7/10	7.5/10
GamePro	N/A	4/5	N/A	4/5
GameRevolution	C+	C+	C+	C+
GameSpot	6.9/10	7.1/10	7.2/10	7.1/10
GameSpy	4/5	4/5	3.5/5	4/5
GameZone	9/10	9.1/10	8/10	8.9/10
IGN	8.9/10	8.9/10	7.8/10	8.9/10
Nintendo Power	3.7/5	N/A	N/A	N/A
Official U.S. PlayStation Magazine	N/A	3.5/5	3/5	N/A
Official Xbox Magazine (US)	N/A	N/A	N/A	8/10
Detroit Free Press	N/A	2/4	N/A	N/A
The Times	3/5	3/5	N/A	3/5

The game received "favorable" reviews on all platforms except the PSP version, which received "average" reviews, according to video game review aggregator Metacritic.

The Times gave the game three stars out of five and said that though the game "does enough to entertain for an hour or two, fans of proper football, played with feet, are likely to find it quite dull." Jim Schaefer of Detroit Free Press gave the PS2 version a score of two stars out of four and called it "a fine game, just like the first version, which earned three stars from me. But the scant innovations in Street 2 make it optional for anyone who has the original." The Sydney Morning Herald similarly gave the same version two-and-a-half stars out of five and stated, "While Street 2 is appealingly approachable, it gets monotonous, particularly for owners of the original. Solo modes are dull and arduous."

During the 8th Annual Interactive Achievement Awards, NFL Street 2 received a nomination for "Console Action Sports Game of the Year" by the Academy of Interactive Arts & Sciences.
