= 2024 Baloncesto Superior Nacional season =

Baloncesto Superior Nacional
- Season: 2024
- Duration: April 3 – August 30
- Games played: 34
- Teams: 12
- TV partner: Telemundo Puerto Rico

Regular season
- Season MVP: Travis Trice

Finals
- Champions: Criollos de Caguas 2nd
- Runners-up: Osos de Manatí
- Finals MVP: Travis Trice (Criollos)

The 2024 Baloncesto Superior Nacional season was the 95th season of the Baloncesto Superior Nacional (BSN). The Gigantes de Carolina came into the season as the defending champions, winning the 2023 BSN Finals. The regular season began on April 3, and ended on July 1. The tie-breaker and play-in game was held on July 10–12, 2024. The 2024 BSN playoffs then began on July 13.

== League news ==
On August 17, 2023, the league approved the transfer of ownership of the Grises de Humacao to a group that relocated them to Caguas and rebranded the team as Criollos de Caguas, a club that participated in the BSN from 1976 to 2009.

== Teams ==
=== Venues and locations ===
Locations of teams participating in 2024 season

| Team | Location | Arena | Capacity |
|---|---|---|---|
| Atléticos de San Germán | San Germán | Arquelio Torres Ramírez Coliseum | 5,000 |
| Cangrejeros de Santurce | Santurce | Roberto Clemente Coliseum | 9,000 |
| Capitanes de Arecibo | Arecibo | Manuel Iguina Coliseum | 12,000 |
| Criollos de Caguas | Caguas | Coliseo Roger Mendoza | 3,000 |
| Gigantes de Carolina | Carolina | Guillermo Angulo Coliseum | 5,000 |
| Indios de Mayagüez | Mayagüez | Palacio de Recreación y Deportes | 5,500 |
| Leones de Ponce | Ponce | Juan Pachín Vicéns Auditorium | 11,000 |
| Mets de Guaynabo | Guaynabo | Mario Morales Coliseum | 5,500 |
| Osos de Manatí | Manatí | Juan Cruz Abreu Coliseum | 8,000 |
| Piratas de Quebradillas | Quebradillas | Raymond Dalmau Coliseum | 5,500 |
| Santeros de Aguada | Aguada | Ismael Delgado Coliseum | 6,000 |
| Vaqueros de Bayamón | Bayamón | Ruben Rodriguez Coliseum | 12,000 |

=== Personnel and sponsorship ===
| Team | Head coach | Captain | Kit manufacturer | Jersey sponsor |
|---|---|---|---|---|
| Atléticos de San Germán | (Puerto Rico) Eddie Casiano | (Puerto Rico) Tjader Fernandez | | |
| Cangrejeros de Santurce | (United States) Brad Greenberg | (Puerto Rico) Angel Matias | Adidas | |
| Capitanes de Arecibo | (Puerto Rico) Juan Cardona | (Dominican Republic) Víctor Liz | AC Sports | Brava Lubricants |
| Criollos de Caguas | (Puerto Rico) Wilhelmus Caanen | (Puerto Rico) Alexander Kappos | Optime Sports | Calesa Toyota |
| Gigantes de Carolina | (Puerto Rico) Carlos Gonzalez | (Puerto Rico) Alex Franklin | | |
| Indios de Mayagüez | (Puerto Rico) Christian Dalmau | (Puerto Rico) Jorge Pacheco | | |
| Leones de Ponce | (Argentina) Sergio Hernández | (Puerto Rico) Jezreel De Jesús | AC Sports | |
| Mets de Guaynabo | (Puerto Rico) J. J. Barea | (Puerto Rico) Jaysean Paige | Monarch | Sixt |
| Osos de Manatí | (Puerto Rico) Iván Ríos | (Puerto Rico) Isaac Sosa | Nike | |
| Piratas de Quebradillas | (Puerto Rico) Rafael Cruz | (Puerto Rico) William Cruz Rodriguez | AC Sports | Sixt |
| Santeros de Aguada | (Puerto Rico) Omar González | (Puerto Rico) Alex Abreu | | Coop Rincón, SpeedyNet |
| Vaqueros de Bayamón | (Puerto Rico) Nelson Colón | (Puerto Rico) Javier Mojica | Optime Sports | Goya Foods |

== Regular season ==
=== Standings ===
Group A

| Pos | Team | Pld | W | L | GF | GA | GD | PCT | Qualification or relegation |
|---|---|---|---|---|---|---|---|---|---|
| 1 | Capitanes de Arecibo | 34 | 23 | 11 | 1926 | 1778 | +148 | .676 | Qualification to playoffs |
| 2 | Santeros de Aguada | 34 | 16 | 18 | 1970 | 1993 | −23 | .471 | Qualification to playoffs |
| 3 | Piratas de Quebradillas | 34 | 16 | 18 | 1784 | 1789 | −5 | .471 | Qualification to playoffs |
| 4 | Leones de Ponce | 34 | 15 | 19 | 1365 | 1503 | −138 | .441 | Tie-Breaker |
| 5 | Indios de Mayagüez | 34 | 15 | 19 | 1843 | 1805 | +38 | .441 | Tie-Breaker |
| 6 | Atléticos de San Germán | 34 | 13 | 21 | 1900 | 1932 | −32 | .382 | |

Updated to match(es) played on 23 May 2024. Source: BSN

Group B

| Pos | Team | Pld | W | L | GF | GA | GD | PCT | Qualification or relegation |
|---|---|---|---|---|---|---|---|---|---|
| 1 | Mets de Guaynabo | 34 | 21 | 13 | 1675 | 1686 | −11 | .618 | Qualification to playoffs |
| 2 | Gigantes de Carolina | 34 | 20 | 14 | 1801 | 1768 | +33 | .588 | Qualification to playoffs |
| 3 | Criollos de Caguas | 34 | 19 | 15 | 1677 | 1638 | +39 | .559 | Qualification to playoffs |
| 4 | Osos de Manatí | 34 | 18 | 16 | 1879 | 1902 | −23 | .529 | Qualification to playoffs |
| 5 | Cangrejeros de Santurce | 34 | 18 | 16 | 1439 | 1430 | +9 | .529 | Qualification to play-in |
| 6 | Vaqueros de Bayamón | 34 | 10 | 24 | 1805 | 1840 | −35 | .294 | |

Updated to match(es) played on 23 May 2024. Source: BSN

=== Statistics ===
==== Individual statistic leaders ====
| Category | Player | Team | Statistic |
|---|---|---|---|
| Points per game | (United States) Emmanuel Mudiay | Piratas de Quebradillas | 21.5 |
| Rebounds per game | (United States) Jared Sullinger | Cangrejeros de Santurce | 15.1 |
| Assists per game | (United States) Travis Trice | Criollos de Caguas | 7.7 |
| Steals per game | (United States) Rondae Hollis-Jefferson | Mets de Guaynabo | 1.6 |
| Blocks per game | (United States) Jordan Bell | Leones de Ponce | 1.9 |
| FG% | (Puerto Rico) Christian M. Negron | Leones de Ponce | 69.0% |
| 3FG% | (Puerto Rico) Alonzo Ortiz Traylor | Indios de Mayagüez | 50.0% |
| FT% | (Puerto Rico) Ivan Gandia | Santeros de Aguada | 93.0% |

==== Team statistic leaders ====
| Category | Team | Statistic |
|---|---|---|
| Points per game | Capitanes de Arecibo | 96.3 |
| Rebounds per game | Cangrejeros de Santurce | 39.6 |
| Assists per game | Santeros de Aguada | 21.9 |
| Steals per game | Capitanes de Arecibo/Mets de Guaynabo | 7.4 |
| Blocks per game | Mets de Guaynabo | 4.2 |
| FG% | Capitanes de Arecibo | 51.0% |
| 3FG% | Capitanes de Arecibo | 40.0% |

=== Awards ===
==== Season Awards ====
On July 11, 2024, the league announced the end of season award winners; with Travis Trice being named the league's Most Valuable Player. This year's BSN Awards event was held in the theater of the Interamerican University of Puerto Rico School of Law.

- Most Valuable Player: (United States) Travis Trice—Criollos de Caguas (20.7 PPG, 7.2 APG, 3.5 RPG)
- Defensive Player of the Year: (United States) (Puerto Rico) George Conditt IV—Gigantes de Carolina (14.6 PPG, 9.2 RPG)
- Rookie of the Year: (Puerto Rico) (Panama) Jhivvan Jackson—Osos de Manatí (12.0 PPG, 2.9 APG, 2.7 RPG)
- Sixth Man of the Year: (Puerto Rico) Emmanuel Maldonado—Cangrejeros de Santurce (8.0 PPG, 2.1 RPG)
- Most Improved Player of the Year: (Puerto Rico) Alfonso Plummer—Capitanes de Arecibo (18.9 PPG, 3.8 APG, 3.1 RPG)
- Coach of the Year: (Puerto Rico) Juan Cardona—Capitanes de Arecibo
- GM of the Year: (Puerto Rico) José Manuel Baeza—Capitanes de Arecibo

==== Finals Awards ====
- 2024 Finals Most Valuable Player: (United States) Travis Trice—Criollos de Caguas (20.9 PPG, 6.1 APG)

== Tie-Breakers and Playoffs ==
=== Tie-Breakers Bracket ===
| Tie-Breaker | | | Play-In |
| | | | 5D | Cangrejeros de Santurce | 82 |
| 4A | Leones de Ponce | 86 | 4A | Leones de Ponce | 85 |
| 5A | Indios de Mayagüez | 81 |

=== Playoff Bracket ===
All rounds are a best-of-seven series; a series ended when one team won four games, and that team advanced to the next round.

- Updated to match(es) played on August 8, 2024.

Quarterfinals
1A | Capitanes de Arecibo | 3
4B | Osos de Manatí | 4
2B | Gigantes de Carolina | 4
3A | Piratas de Quebradillas | 3
1B | Mets de Guaynabo | 3
4A | Leones de Ponce | 4
2A | Santeros de Aguada | 3
3B | Criollos de Caguas | 4

Semifinals
4B | Osos de Manatí | 4
2B | Gigantes de Carolina | 0
4A | Leones de Ponce | 2
3B | Criollos de Caguas | 4

Finals
4B | Osos de Manatí | 3
3B | Criollos de Caguas | 4

== La Final ==
The 2024 Final (also known as the 2024 La Final Brava for sponsorship reasons) is the championship series of the Baloncesto Superior Nacional (BSN)'s 2024 season and conclusion to the season's playoffs. The final's series was a best-of-seven alternating venues after every game between the final two teams: Criollos de Caguas and Osos de Manatí.

=== Series summary ===
| Game | Date | Road team | Result | Home team |
|---|---|---|---|---|
| Game 1 | August 17 | Osos de Manatí | 105 – 99 (1–0) | Criollos de Caguas |
| Game 2 | August 19 | Criollos de Caguas | 109 – 104 OT (1–1) | Osos de Manatí |
| Game 3 | August 21 | Osos de Manatí | 89 – 85 (2–1) | Criollos de Caguas |
| Game 4 | August 23 | Criollos de Caguas | 91 – 86 (2–2) | Osos de Manatí |
| Game 5 | August 25 | Osos de Manatí | 98 – 89 (3–2) | Criollos de Caguas |
| Game 6 | August 27 | Criollos de Caguas | 122 – 121 2OT (3–3) | Osos de Manatí |
| Game 7 | August 30 | Osos de Manatí | 81 – 96 (3–4) | Criollos de Caguas |

=== Game summaries ===
Note: Times are EDT (UTC−4) as listed by the BSN.

==== Game 1 ====
YouTube

August 17
8:05 pm GMT

Recap

Osos de Manatí 104, Criollos de Caguas 99
Scoring by quarter: 31–18, 23–26, 29–27, 22–28
| Pts: Cheick Diallo 24; Rebs: Cheick Diallo 15; Asts: Norris Cole 12 | Pts: Travis Trice 21; Rebs: Akil Mitchell 15; Asts: Travis Trice 11 |
Manatí leads series, 1–0

Coliseo Roger Mendoza, Caguas, Puerto Rico
Referees:

==== Game 2 ====
YouTube

August 19
8:05 pm GMT

Recap

Criollos de Caguas 109, Osos de Manatí 104 (OT)
Scoring by quarter: 29–21, 22–24, 22–26, 26–28, Overtime: 10–5
| Pts: Travis Trice 37; Rebs: Louis King 12; Asts: Louis King 7 | Pts: Ethan Thompson 22; Rebs: Cheick Diallo 15; Asts: Norris Cole 10 |
Series tied, 1–1

Coliseo Juan Aubin Cruz Abreu, Manati, Puerto Rico
Referees:

==== Game 3 ====
YouTube

August 21
8:05 pm GMT

Recap

Osos de Manatí 89, Criollos de Caguas 85
Scoring by quarter: 23–25, 30–19, 19–22, 17–19
| Pts: Jhivvan Jackson 24; Rebs: Cheick Diallo 7 Alex Morales; Asts: Norris Cole 12; Chris Ortiz | Pts: Louis King 23; Rebs: Akil Mitchell 13; Asts: Akil Mitchell 6 |
Manatí leads series, 2-1

Coliseo Roger Mendoza, Caguas, Puerto Rico
Referees:

==== Game 4 ====
YouTube

August 23
8:05 pm GMT

Recap

Criollos de Caguas 91, Osos de Manatí 86
Scoring by quarter: 24–29, 23–16, 23–17, 21–24
| Pts: Louis King 21; Rebs: Akil Mitchell 10; Asts: Travis Trice 8 | Pts: Cheick Diallo 21; Rebs: Cheick Diallo 8 Asts: Norris Cole 9 |
Series tied, 2–2

Coliseo Juan Aubin Cruz Abreu, Manati, Puerto Rico
Referees:

==== Game 5 ====
YouTube

August 25
8:05 pm GMT

Recap

Osos de Manatí 98, Criollos de Caguas 89
Scoring by quarter: 18–16, 29–19, 27–31, 24–23
| Pts: Ethan Thompson 21; Rebs: Cheick Diallo 8 Asts: Norris Cole 6 | Pts: Devon Collier 18; Rebs: Devon Collier 11; Asts: Travis Trice 5 |
Manatí leads series, 3–2

Coliseo Roger Mendoza, Caguas, Puerto Rico
Referees:

==== Game 6 ====
YouTube

August 27
8:05 pm GMT

Recap

Criollos de Caguas 122, Osos de Manatí 121 (OT)
Scoring by quarter: 23–22, 18–19, 19–24, 31–26, Overtime: 15–15, 16–15
| Pts: Travis Trice 32; Rebs: Akil Mitchell 14; Asts: Akil Mitchell 6 Travis Trice | Pts: Norris Cole 35; Rebs: Tyler Davis 11; Asts: Norris Cole 7 |
Series tied, 3–3

Coliseo Juan Aubin Cruz Abreu, Manati, Puerto Rico
Referees:

==== Game 7 ====
YouTube

August 30
8:10 pm GMT

Recap

Osos de Manatí 81, Criollos de Caguas 96
Scoring by quarter: 20–19, 25–30, 13–26, 23–21
| Pts: Alex Morales 25; Rebs: Cheick Diallo 10; Asts: Norris Cole 7 | Pts: Alexander Kappos 22; Rebs: Akil Mitchell 15; Asts: Travis Trice 8 |
Caguas wins series, 4–3

Coliseo Roger Mendoza, Caguas, Puerto Rico
Referees:
