= 2024 BSN Finals =

2024 basketball competition

2024 BSN finals
| Team | Coach | Wins |
|---|---|---|
| Criollos de Caguas | Wilhelmus Caanen | 4 |
| Osos de Manatí | Ivan Rios | 3 |
- Dates: August 17–30
- MVP: Travis Trice (Criollos de Caguas)

The 2024 BSN finals (also known, for promotional reasons, as La Final Brava or The Brava Finals) was the championship series that decided the 2024 Baloncesto Superior Nacional champions in Puerto Rico. The best-of-seven playoffs pitted the one time (2006) champions Criollos from Caguas, versus the Osos from Manati, who were trying for their first title.

The series started on August 17 and finished on August 30, with the Criollos securing their second championship. Travis Trice of the Criollos was named the Finals' Most Valuable Player.

== Series Notes ==
- As head coaches, the series featured two former BSN players, Wilhelmus Caanen of the Criollos and Ivan Rios of the Osos, who were once teammates as members of the Criollos.
- The six first games in the series were won by the visiting team, it being the first time in BSN Finals' history this happened.

== Television and other media ==
The series was shown on canal 2 in Puerto Rico and, via a canal 2 feed, on the internet website YouTube internationally.

== Series summary ==
=== Game 1 ===
YouTube

August 17
8:05 pm GMT

Recap

Osos de Manatí 104, Criollos de Caguas 99
Scoring by quarter: 31–18, 23–26, 29–27, 22–28
| Pts: Cheick Diallo 24; Rebs: Cheick Diallo 15; Asts: Norris Cole 12 | Pts: Travis Trice 21; Rebs: Akil Mitchell 15; Asts: Travis Trice 11 |
Manatí leads series, 1–0

Coliseo Roger Mendoza, Caguas, Puerto Rico
Referees:

=== Game 2 ===
YouTube

August 19
8:05 pm GMT

Recap

Criollos de Caguas 109, Osos de Manatí 104 (OT)
Scoring by quarter: 29–21, 22–24, 22–26, 26–28, Overtime: 10–5
| Pts: Travis Trice 37; Rebs: Louis King 12; Asts: Louis King 7 | Pts: Ethan Thompson 22; Rebs: Cheick Diallo 15; Asts: Norris Cole 10 |
Series tied, 1–1

Coliseo Juan Aubin Cruz Abreu, Manati, Puerto Rico
Referees:

In Game Two, Manati was leading by three points, when Travis Trice of the Criollos threw a half-court shot with one second left and made it, to tie the game and send it to over-time. The Criollos eventually won this game, 109–104.

=== Game 3 ===
YouTube

August 21
8:05 pm GMT

Recap

Osos de Manatí 89, Criollos de Caguas 85
Scoring by quarter: 23–25, 30–19, 19–22, 17–19
| Pts: Jhivvan Jackson 24; Rebs: Cheick Diallo 7 Alex Morales; Asts: Norris Cole 12; Chris Ortiz | Pts: Louis King 23; Rebs: Akil Mitchell 13; Asts: Akil Mitchell 6 |
Manatí leads series, 2-1

Coliseo Roger Mendoza, Caguas, Puerto Rico
Referees:

=== Game 4 ===
YouTube

August 23
8:05 pm GMT

Recap

Criollos de Caguas 91, Osos de Manatí 86
Scoring by quarter: 24–29, 23–16, 23–17, 21–24
| Pts: Louis King 21; Rebs: Akil Mitchell 10; Asts: Travis Trice 8 | Pts: Cheick Diallo 21; Rebs: Cheick Diallo 8 Asts: Norris Cole 9 |
Series tied, 2–2

Coliseo Juan Aubin Cruz Abreu, Manati, Puerto Rico
Referees:

=== Game 5 ===
YouTube

August 25
8:05 pm GMT

Recap

Osos de Manatí 98, Criollos de Caguas 89
Scoring by quarter: 18–16, 29–19, 27–31, 24–23
| Pts: Ethan Thompson 21; Rebs: Cheick Diallo 8 Asts: Norris Cole 6 | Pts: Devon Collier 18; Rebs: Devon Collier 11; Asts: Travis Trice 5 |
Manatí leads series, 3–2

Coliseo Roger Mendoza, Caguas, Puerto Rico
Referees:

The series was led by Manati, three games to two, after winning Game 5, 98 to 89.

=== Game 6 ===
YouTube

August 27
8:05 pm GMT

Recap

Criollos de Caguas 122, Osos de Manatí 121 (OT)
Scoring by quarter: 23–22, 18–19, 19–24, 31–26, Overtime: 15–15, 16–15
| Pts: Travis Trice 32; Rebs: Akil Mitchell 14; Asts: Akil Mitchell 6 Travis Trice | Pts: Norris Cole 35; Rebs: Tyler Davis 11; Asts: Norris Cole 7 |
Series tied, 3–3

Coliseo Juan Aubin Cruz Abreu, Manati, Puerto Rico
Referees:

After a 122–121, double-overtime win by Caguas at Manati on 27 August 2024, the series was tied at three wins apiece.

=== Game 7 ===
YouTube

August 30
8:10 pm GMT

Recap

Osos de Manatí 81, Criollos de Caguas 96
Scoring by quarter: 20–19, 25–30, 13–26, 23–21
| Pts: Alex Morales 25; Rebs: Cheick Diallo 10; Asts: Norris Cole 7 | Pts: Alexander Kappos 22; Rebs: Akil Mitchell 15; Asts: Travis Trice 8 |
Caguas wins series, 4–3

Coliseo Roger Mendoza, Caguas, Puerto Rico
Referees:

With a 96–81 victory in Game Seven, the Criollos won their second title in the franchise's history.
