= Gilberto Clavell =

Puerto Rican basketball player

No. 41 – Criollos de Caguas
- Position: Small forward / power forward
- League: Baloncesto Superior Nacional

Personal information
- Born: August 10, 1989 (age 36) Mayagüez, Puerto Rico
- Listed height: 6 ft 6 in (1.98 m)
- Listed weight: 220 lb (100 kg)

Career information
- High school: Florida Air Academy (Melbourne, Florida)
- College: Collin College (2007–2009); Sam Houston State (2009–2011)
- NBA draft: 2011: undrafted
- Playing career: 2011–present

Career history
- 2011–2012: Maratonistas de Coamo
- 2012–2013: Kouvot
- 2013: Caciques de Humacao
- 2013–2014: Hapoel Migdal Ha'emek
- 2014–2015: Maratonistas de Coamo
- 2015: Hapoel Afula
- 2016–2020: Santeros de Aguada
- 2020–2021: Plateros de Fresnillo
- 2021–2022: Cariduros de Fajardo
- 2022–2024: Indios de Mayagüez
- 2024: Piratas de Quebradillas
- 2025: Mets de Guaynabo
- 2026–present: Criollos de Caguas

Career highlights
- BSN champion (2019); Southland Player of the Year (2011); First-team All-Southland (2011)
Medals
Men's basketball
Representing Puerto Rico
Pan American Games
| Silver medal – second place | 2019 Lima | Team |
Central American and Caribbean Games
| Gold medal – first place | 2018 Barranquilla | Team |
Men's 3x3 basketball
Pan American Games
| Silver medal – second place | 2019 Lima | Team |
Central American and Caribbean Games
| Gold medal – first place | 2018 Barranquilla | Team |

Gilberto Clavell III (born August 10, 1989) is a Puerto Rican professional basketball player for Criollos de Caguas of the Baloncesto Superior Nacional (BSN). Clavell was an All-American college player at Sam Houston State University. Clavell represents the Puerto Rico national basketball team and the Puerto Rico 3x3 men's national team at the international level.

== College career ==
Clavell, a 6'6" small forward who prepped at Florida Air Academy, played two years at Collin County Community College in Texas. He then moved to Sam Houston State, where he scored over 1,000 points in only two years (1,166). As a junior in 2009–10, Clavell averaged 17 points per game and was named Southland Conference Newcomer of the Year and a second team All-Conference pick. As a senior, Clavell averaged 19.4 points per game on 55.9 percent shooting and grabbed 7.3 rebounds per game on his way to Southland Player of the Year honors and an Associated Press honorable mention All-American designation.

== Professional career ==
Following the completion of his college career, Clavell signed with Maratonistas de Coamo of Puerto Rico's top league. In 2012, he signed with Kouvot of Finland's Korisliiga. In October 2013, Clavell signed with Hapoel Migdal Ha'emek in Israel, and in 2015 he moved to another Israeli team, Hapoel Afula.

Clavell joined Mets de Guaynabo in 2025.

== Personal life ==
Clavell's brother Gian is also a professional basketball player who previously played for the Dallas Mavericks, as well as played college basketball at Colorado State.
