= Akil Mitchell =

American-Panamanian basketball player (born 1992)

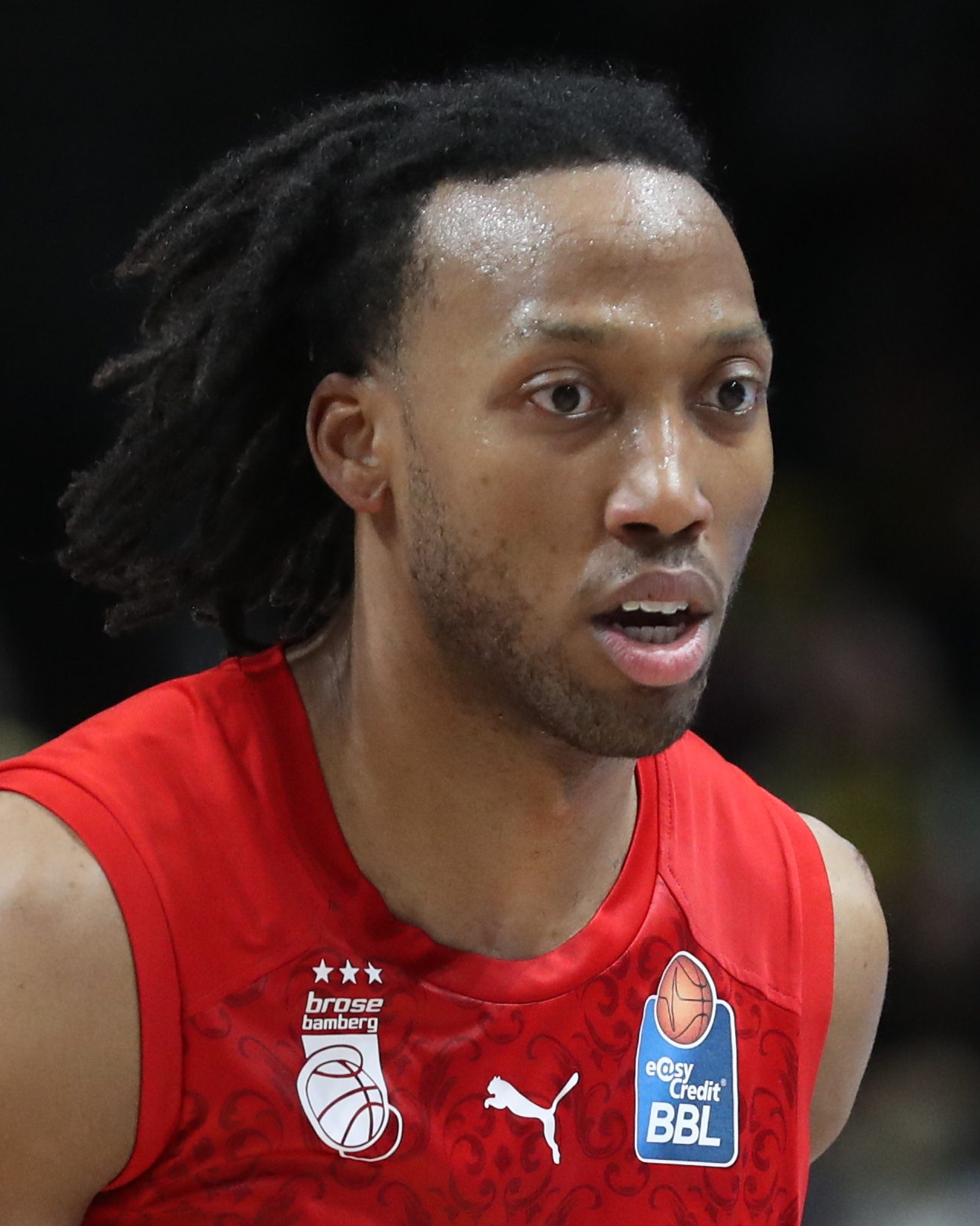
- Mitchell in 2022

No. 25 – Nagasaki Velca
- Position: Center / power forward
- League: B.League

Personal information
- Born: June 26, 1992 (age 34) Charlotte, North Carolina, U.S.
- Listed height: 6 ft 9 in (2.06 m)
- Listed weight: 234 lb (106 kg)

Career information
- High school: Charlotte Christian (Charlotte, North Carolina)
- College: Virginia (2010–2014)
- NBA draft: 2014: undrafted
- Playing career: 2014–present

Career history
- 2014–2015: Rio Grande Valley Vipers
- 2015–2016: Olympique Antibes
- 2016–2017: New Zealand Breakers
- 2017–2018: Long Island Nets
- 2018–2019: Boulazac Basket Dordogne
- 2019–2020: Pallacanestro Trieste
- 2020: Hapoel Gilboa Galil
- 2020–2021: Maccabi Rishon LeZion
- 2021: Pınar Karşıyaka
- 2021–2022: Brose Bamberg
- 2022–2023: AEK Athens
- 2023: Grises de Humacao
- 2023–2024: Ningbo Rockets
- 2024: Criollos de Caguas
- 2024: Qingdao Eagles
- 2024–2025: Meralco Bolts
- 2025: Criollos de Caguas
- 2025–present: Nagasaki Velca

Career highlights
- All-Champions League First Team (2023); All-Champions League Defensive Team (2023); Greek League All-Star (2022); BSN champion (2024); Third-team All-ACC (2013); ACC All-Defensive Team (2014)
- Stats at Basketball Reference

Akil Anthony Mitchell (born June 26, 1992) is an American-Panamanian professional basketball player for the Nagasaki Velca of the B.League. He played college basketball for the University of Virginia.

== College career ==
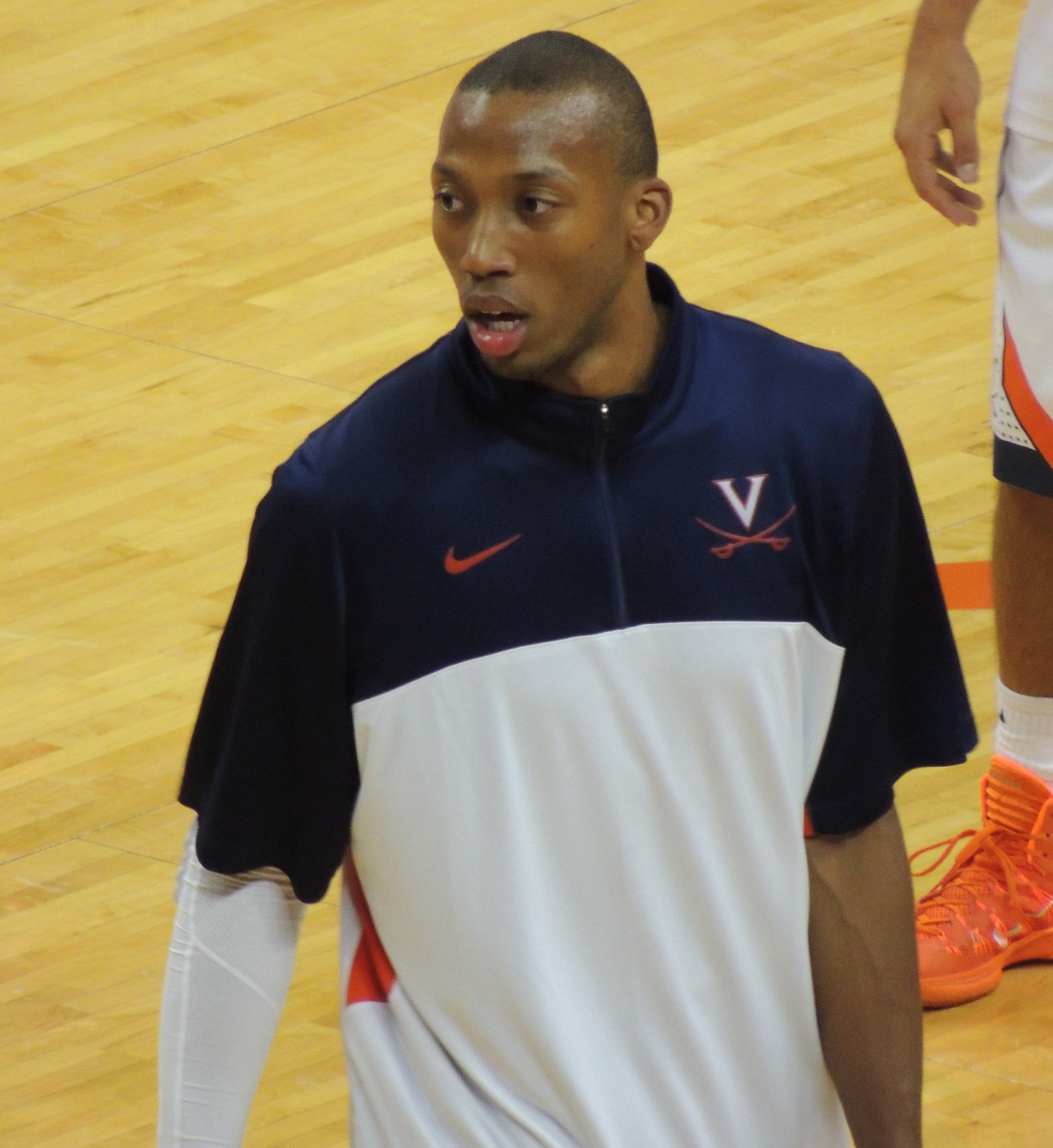
Mitchell at Virginia in 2013.

Mitchell came to the Virginia from the Charlotte Christian School in Charlotte, North Carolina as a lightly-regarded recruit, choosing the Cavaliers over offers from Navy and George Washington. He had an inconsistent freshman season in 2010–11, but played more than expected after an injury to star Mike Scott.

He joined Scott and classmate Joe Harris in the Cavaliers' starting lineup midway through the 2011–12 season as the trio led the team to a 22–10 record and the program's first NCAA tournament appearance in five years. As a junior the next year, Mitchell averaged 13.1 points and 8.9 rebounds per game, earning third-team All-Atlantic Coast Conference honors. With more support as a senior, Mitchell's personal statistics declined, but the Cavaliers enjoyed one of their best seasons in years, recording a 30–7 record, winning both the regular-season and ACC tournament championships and earning a top seed in the 2014 NCAA tournament. Mitchell was named to the ACC All-Defensive team and second-team All ACC Tournament.

=== Collegiate statistics ===
| Year | Team | GP | GS | MPG | FG% | 3P% | FT% | RPG | APG | SPG | BPG | PPG |
|---|---|---|---|---|---|---|---|---|---|---|---|---|
| 2010–11 | Virginia | 29 | 1 | 15.1 | .338 | .125 | .517 | 3.0 | .8 | .6 | .2 | 2.4 |
| 2011–12 | Virginia | 32 | 15 | 22.0 | .505 | .000 | .509 | 4.4 | .8 | .7 | .3 | 4.1 |
| 2012–13 | Virginia | 35 | 35 | 30.5 | .545 | .000 | .693 | 8.9 | 1.5 | 1.3 | .4 | 13.1 |
| 2013–14 | Virginia | 37 | 36 | 25.7 | .561 | .000 | .427 | 7.0 | 1.2 | .8 | .6 | 6.8 |
| Career | | 133 | 87 | 23.8 | .519 | .090 | .570 | 6.0 | 1.1 | .8 | .4 | 6.9 |

== Professional career ==
After going undrafted in the 2014 NBA draft, Mitchell joined the Houston Rockets for the 2014 NBA Summer League. On September 26, 2014, he signed with the Rockets, but was later waived by the team on October 23. On November 2, 2014, he was acquired by the Rio Grande Valley Vipers of the NBA Development League as an affiliate player of the Rockets. In 49 games for the Vipers in 2014–15, he averaged 9.8 points, 9.0 rebounds, 1.6 assists and 1.0 steals per game.

In July 2015, Mitchell joined the Brooklyn Nets for the 2015 NBA Summer League. On August 13, 2015, he signed with Olympique Antibes for the 2015–16 LNB Pro A season. In 34 games for Antibes, he averaged 9.2 points, 7.2 rebounds and 1.6 assists per game.

In July 2016, Mitchell joined the New York Knicks for the 2016 NBA Summer League. On August 30, 2016, he signed with the New Zealand Breakers for the 2016–17 NBL season. On January 26, 2017, Mitchell fell to the floor in agony early in the fourth quarter of the Breakers' 94–81 loss to the Cairns Taipans after what seemed to be an innocuous poke to the face while contesting a rebound with Taipans centre Nnanna Egwu resulted in his left eyeball coming out of its socket. Mitchell was taken to Auckland Hospital after the incident, where he was advised by specialists that while there was some damage to the eye, early reports were positive that the injury was not as serious as first feared. Mitchell was later discharged by specialists that night and reported having vision in the eye. On February 7, 2017, he returned to the US to seek further specialist advice on his injured eye. In 25 games for the Breakers, Mitchell averaged 9.5 points, 7.2 rebounds and 2.1 assists per game.

On February 24, 2017, Mitchell was acquired by the Long Island Nets of the NBA Development League. In four games for Long Island, he averaged 8.3 points, 6.8 rebounds and 2.8 assists per game.

On September 24, 2017, Mitchell signed with the Brooklyn Nets. He was waived by Brooklyn on October 11, 2017.

On August 4, 2018, Mitchell signed with Boulazac Basket Dordogne of the French LNB Pro A.

On July 30, 2019, he signed with Pallacanestro Trieste of the Italian Lega Basket Serie A (LBA).

The 2019–20 season in Italy was cancelled early due to the COVID-19 pandemic.

But in Israel the season was restored, and Mitchell signed with Hapoel Gilboa Galil on May 26, 2020, for the end of the season.

On August 16, 2020, he signed with Maccabi Rishon LeZion in Israel. Mitchell averaged 15.6 points, 8.8 rebounds (third in the Israeli Basketball Premier League), 2.8 assists and 1.6 steals (9th) per game, with a .599 field goal percentage (8th).

On July 14, 2021, he signed with Karşıyaka Basket of the Turkish Super League. Mitchell averaged 4.3 points, 5.3 rebounds, and 2.0 assists per game.

On November 25 of the same year, he signed with Brose Bamberg of the Basketball Bundesliga (BBL).

On August 2, 2022, Mitchell signed with Greek club AEK Athens. In 22 domestic league games, he averaged 12.6 points, 8 rebounds, and 2.6 assists, playing around 26 minutes per contest. Additionally, he averaged 14.5 points, 8.5 rebounds and 2.9 assists in the club's Basketball Champions League campaign, where they reached the quarter-finals.

On April 29, 2023, he signed a contract with Grises de Humacao of the Baloncesto Superior Nacional in Puerto Rico.

On September 7, 2023, Mitchell signed with Ningbo Rockets of the Chinese Basketball Association (CBA). On January 14, 2024, his contract was terminated.

On March 11, 2024, Mitchell signed with Criollos de Caguas of the Baloncesto Superior Nacional.

On July 5, 2024, Mitchell signed with Yokohama B-Corsairs of the B.League. On September 1, his contract was terminated at his request.

On September 19, 2024, Mitchell signed with Qingdao Eagles of the Chinese Basketball Association (CBA). On November 5, he left Qingdao Eagles, replaced by Jordan Mickey.

On November 10, 2024, Mitchell signed with the Meralco Bolts of the Philippine Basketball Association (PBA) as the team's import for the 2024–25 PBA Commissioner's Cup and the 2024–25 East Asia Super League.

== National team career ==
In May 2016, Mitchell trialled for the Panama men's national basketball team ahead of the 2016 Centrobasket in June. He made the squad, and in six games for Panama, he averaged 5.0 points, 5.5 rebounds, 1.8 assists and 1.0 steals per game.
