= Devon Collier =

Puerto-Rican-American basketball player (born 1991)

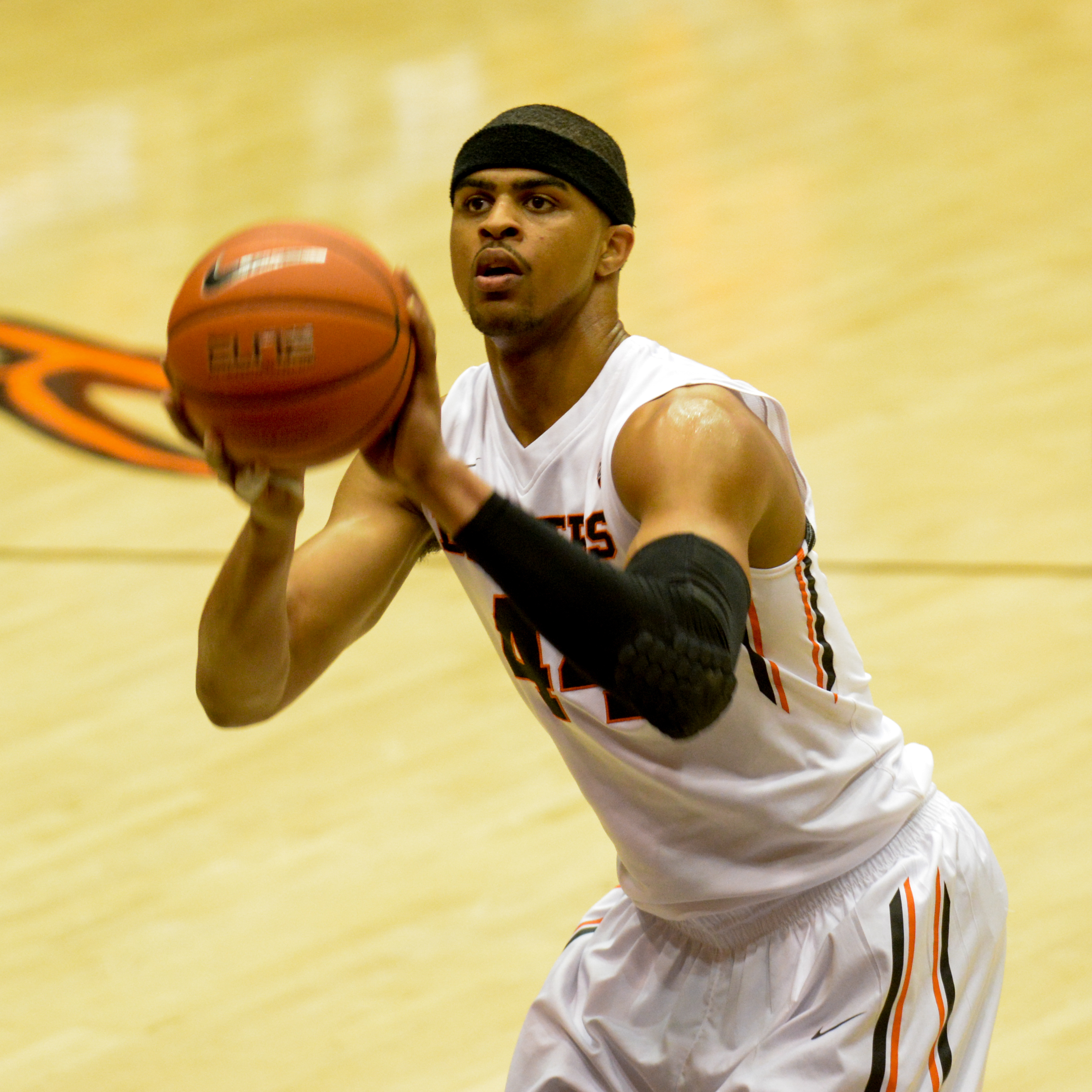
- Collier with the Oregon State Beavers in 2014

No. 44 – Cangrejeros de Santurce
- Position: Power forward
- League: BSN

Personal information
- Born: January 20, 1991 (age 35) Bronx, New York, U.S.
- Listed height: 6 ft 8 in (2.03 m)
- Listed weight: 220 lb (100 kg)

Career information
- High school: St. Anthony (Jersey City, New Jersey)
- College: Oregon State (2010–2014)
- NBA draft: 2014: undrafted
- Playing career: 2014–present

Career history
- 2014–2015: Caciques de Humacao
- 2015–2016: Hapoel Galil Elyon
- 2016–2017: Indios de Mayagüez
- 2017: Leones de Ponce
- 2017: Soles de Mexicali
- 2017–2018: Poitiers Basket
- 2018: Leones de Ponce
- 2018: Caciques de Humacao
- 2019: Indios de Mayagüez
- 2019: Capitanes de Arecibo
- 2019: Leñadores de Durango
- 2019–2020: Astros de Jalisco
- 2020–2022: Capitanes de Arecibo
- 2022: Cangrejeros de Santurce
- 2022: Gladiadores de Anzoátegui
- 2023: Capitanes de Arecibo
- 2023: Ciclista Olímpico
- 2024: Criollos de Caguas
- 2024–2025: Plateros de Fresnillo
- 2025–present: Cangrejeros de Santurce

Career highlights
- 2× BSN champion (2021, 2024)

Devon Collier (born January 20, 1991) is a Puerto Rican basketball player for the Cangrejeros de Santurce of the Baloncesto Superior Nacional (BSN). He played college basketball for Oregon State Beavers men's basketball team.

== High school career ==
Collier attended St. Anthony High School, was a four-star recruit and a consensus top 150 prospect rating 76th overall in ESPN. In his freshman year, he averaged 17.0 points and 8.0 rebounds.

== College career ==
Collier played for the Oregon State Beavers men's basketball team, In his freshman season, he averaged 7 points, 4.4 rebounds and 0.7 assists per game. In his sophomore season, he averaged 13.1 points, 5.2 rebounds and 1.8 assists. In his junior year, he averaged 12.6 points, 6 rebounds and 1.6 assists per game. In July 2013, Collier was suspended indefinitely for violating team rules, though he only missed a game. In his senior year, he averaged 13.4 points, 5.6 rebounds and 1.5 assists per game.

== Professional career ==
In 2014, he signed for the Puerto Rican side Caciques de Humacao where he averaged 8.7 points, 7.2 rebounds and 0.9 assists per game. In his second season at Caciques de Humacao, he averaged 13.7 points, 5.9 rebounds and 2.4 assists per game In the 2015–16 season, he moved to the Israeli side Hapoel Galil Elyon where he averaged 22.4 points, 8.3 rebounds and 3.4 assists per game, playing 12 games. In the 2016–17 season he moved to the Puerto Rican side Indios de Mayagüez where he averaged 12.9 points, 7.9 rebounds and 2 assists per game. In the 2017–18 season, he moved back to the Caciques de Humacao where he averaged 9.3 points, 7.3 rebounds and 2 assists per game playing three games before moving to the French team Poitiers Basket where he averaged 12.1 points, 5.4 rebounds and 2.1 assists per game. He moved to the Capitanes de Arecibo in the 2018–19 season, where he averaged 6.4 points, 4.3 rebounds and 1.1 assists per game.

== National team career ==
Collier represented the Puerto Rican national basketball team at the 2019 FIBA Basketball World Cup where he averaged 5.8 points, 4 rebounds and 0.4 assists per game.
