= Criollos de Caguas (basketball) =

Puerto Rican professional basketball team

- Nickname: Criollos, La Presión "Creoles", "The Pressure"
- Leagues: BSN; Conferencia B
- Founded: 1976–2009; 2023 (refounded)
- Arena: Roger Mendoza Coliseum
- Capacity: 3,000
- Location: Caguas, Puerto Rico
- Team colors: Pink, flamingo, black
- Head coach: Wilhelmus Caanen
- Ownership: Ric Elias; John Herrero
- Championships: 2 (2006, 2024)
- Website: https://criollosbsn.com/
| Home | Away | Third |

The Criollos de Caguas are a professional basketball team based in Caguas, Puerto Rico. They play in the Baloncesto Superior Nacional (BSN) League, the top division basketball league in Puerto Rico. They most recently became league champions by defeating the Osos de Manatí in 7 games in the final of the 2024 Baloncesto Superior Nacional season.

== History ==
The Criollos professional basketball team began to play during the 1969 season, joining their counterparts the Criollos of baseball. Unlike their baseball counterparts, however, the basketball Criollos did not enjoy a wild and steady success, instead settling for moderate success.

The Criollos, with Cayey's resident Willie Melendez and Bayamon-born Willie Quiñones on their side, reached the semi-finals in 1985. Melendez was traded to the Polluelos de Aibonito the following season, however, and The Criollos then went on a downward spiral, going 12–21 in 1986, 7–23 in 1987, 9–24 in 1988 and 10–20 in 1989. Quinones, although the Criollos only once posted a winning record with him as a player, always refused to be traded as he declared over and over again that he would only play for his hometown's team. He and Melendez (Melendez with 6,123) are members of the exclusive group of basketball players that have scored 5,000 or more points in Puerto Rican basketball history, 5,000 points being a coveted number because of the relatively small number of games played each year (from 30 to 33 games per season).

In 1987, Caguas Mayor Angel O. Berrios took over as team owner. In the 1990s, a Criollos revival began, and he hired such players as Luis Allende and Gary Joe Burgos. The Criollos reached the semi-finals again in 2002, and got to the playoffs in 2003, losing in the first round.

The Criollos decided not to play during the 2005 BSN season, partly because of economical reasons, but the team returned for the 2006 season and won the tournament for the first time in their history after beating the Cangrejeros de Santurce in the finals.

The Criollos entered the league's "Super 6" semifinals. They remained with possibilities of earning advancing until the final stages of the phase, gathering 20 points. On June 10, 2008, one of the team's games against the Capitanes de Arecibo was cancelled when the league suspected that one of the Capitanes players was playing against the league's rules.

The team reached the BSN finals during the 2024 season, where they faced the Osos de Manatí. Nearly all games were tightly contested, with the teams taking turns winning matches. In Game 2, with the Criollos down by three points, Travis Trice made a buzzer-beater, half-court shot to tie the game and send it to overtime. The Criollos eventually won the game, 109:104, with Trice making another key three-point shot during the overtime, to tie the series at one-win-apiece. As the Osos had a 3–2 series advantage following Game 5, and Game 6 went into overtime just like Game 2, the Criollos were on the brink of losing, but managed to win the game by one point. On August 30, 2024, the Criollos won Game 7 of the BSN Finals 96:81, the biggest margin victory in the series by either team, winning the series 4–3, and the championship.

== Current roster ==
Note: Flags indicate national team eligibility at FIBA-sanctioned events. Players may hold other non-FIBA nationalities not displayed.

Criollos de Caguas roster
Players
Coaches

| Pos. | No. | Nat. | Name | Ht. | Wt. | Age |
|---|---|---|---|---|---|---|
| PF | 0 | (Puerto Rico) | Medina, Oenis | 6 ft 8 in (2.03 m) | 230 lb (100 kg) | 28 – May 25, 1998 |
| G | 1 | (Puerto Rico) | Huertas, Hiram | 6 ft 2 in (1.88 m) | 185 lb (84 kg) | 29 – November 1, 1997 |
| G | 2 | (United States) (Puerto Rico) | Early Jr., Jeff (DC) | 6 ft 3 in (1.91 m) | 185 lb (84 kg) | 38 – September 2, 1988 |
| F | 4 | (Dominican Republic) (United States) | Núñez, Richard (DC) | 6 ft 9 in (2.06 m) | 220 lb (100 kg) | 26 – July 27, 2000 |
| G | 10 | (Puerto Rico) | Rivera, Luís | 5 ft 11 in (1.80 m) | 165 lb (75 kg) | 28 – September 22, 1998 |
| G | 12 | (United States) | O'Connell, Michael | 6 ft 2 in (1.88 m) | 195 lb (88 kg) | 25 – February 23, 2001 |
| PG | 13 | (United States) | Trice, Travis (I) | 6 ft 0 in (1.83 m) | 176 lb (80 kg) | 33 – January 22, 1993 |
| PF | 14 | (Puerto Rico) (Canada) | Kappos, Alexander (DC) | 6 ft 10 in (2.08 m) | 230 lb (100 kg) | 29 – July 26, 1997 |
| G/F | 15 | (United States) | Denton, Joshua | 6 ft 6 in (1.98 m) | 210 lb (95 kg) | 23 – November 8, 2002 |
| G | 24 | (Puerto Rico) | López, Christian | 6 ft 0 in (1.83 m) | 190 lb (86 kg) | 31 – June 12, 1995 |
| PF | 41 | (Puerto Rico) | Clavell, Gilberto | 6 ft 6 in (1.98 m) | 220 lb (100 kg) | 37 – August 10, 1989 |
| G/F | 44 | (Puerto Rico) | Peguero, Geancarlo | 6 ft 5 in (1.96 m) | 205 lb (93 kg) | 22 – June 2, 2004 |
| SF | | (United States) | Camper, Manny | 6 ft 7 in (2.01 m) | 205 lb (93 kg) | 27 – 18 May 1999 |
| PF | | (Puerto Rico) | Martínez, Jayden | 6 ft 7 in (2.01 m) | 210 lb (95 kg) |
| G | | (Puerto Rico) | Ralat, Alejandro |

Head coach

- (Puerto Rico) Wilhelmus Caanen

Assistant coach(es)

- (Puerto Rico) TBA

Legend

- (C) Team captain
- (DC) Dual citizenship
- (I) Import player
- Injured

- Roster
Updated: 7 November 2026

=== Depth chart ===
| Pos. | Starting 5 | Bench 1 | Bench 2 |
|---|---|---|---|
| C | | Oenis Medina | Gilberto Clavell |
| PF | Alexander Kappos | Richard Núñez | Geancarlo Peguero |
| SF | | | Joshua Denton |
| SG | Christian López | Jeff Early Jr. | Hiram Huertas |
| PG | Travis Trice | Michael O'Connell | Luís Rivera |

== Notable players ==
Note: Flags indicate national team eligibility at FIBA-sanctioned events. Players may hold other non-FIBA nationalities not displayed.

Criteria

To appear in this section a player must have either:

- Set a club record or won an individual award while at the club
- Played at least one official international match for their national team at any time
- Played at least one official NBA match at any time.

- (United States) Moses Brown - 2026 Defensive Player of the Year
- (United States) Louis King - 2x BSN All Star, 1x BSN Champion (2024)
- (United States) Travis Trice - 2x MVP (2024, 2026), 2024 Finals MVP
- Willie Quiñones - 1979 silver medalist for Puerto Rico in basketball at the Pan American Games
- (Puerto Rico) Ricardo Cruz Lebrón
- (Puerto Rico) Peter John Ramos - BSN Most Improved Player (2002)
