= Travis Trice =

American basketball player

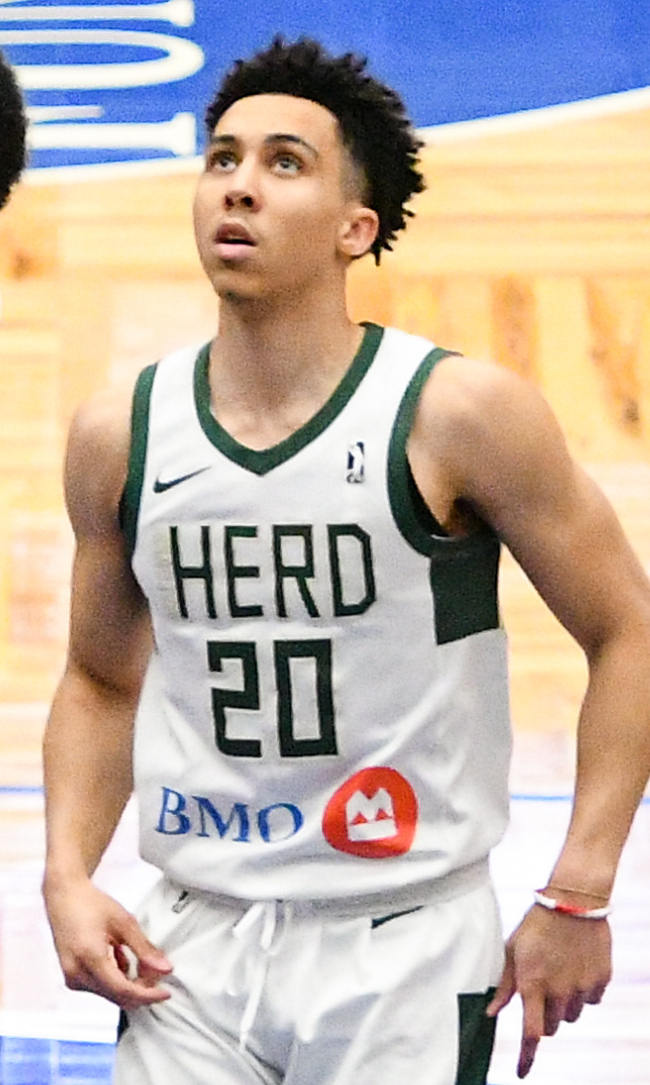
- Trice with the Wisconsin Herd in 2019

No. 13 – Criollos de Caguas
- Position: Point guard
- League: BSN

Personal information
- Born: January 22, 1993 (age 33) Springfield, Ohio, U.S.
- Listed height: 6 ft 0 in (1.83 m)
- Listed weight: 170 lb (77 kg)

Career information
- High school: Wayne (Huber Heights, Ohio)
- College: Michigan State (2011–2015)
- NBA draft: 2015: undrafted
- Playing career: 2015–present

Career history
- 2015–2016: Westchester Knicks
- 2016–2017: Cairns Taipans
- 2017: Westchester Knicks
- 2017–2018: Brisbane Bullets
- 2018: Champville SC
- 2018–2019: Wisconsin Herd
- 2019: Austin Spurs
- 2019: Tofaş
- 2019–2020: SIG Strasbourg
- 2020: Germani Brescia
- 2020–2021: Galatasaray
- 2021–2022: Śląsk Wrocław
- 2022–2023: Murcia
- 2023: Grises de Humacao
- 2023–2024: Xinjiang Flying Tigers
- 2024–present: Criollos de Caguas
- 2024–2026: Beijing Royal Fighters
- 2026–present: Fujian Sturgeons

Career highlights
- PLK champion (2022); PLK Finals MVP (2022); PLK Most Valuable Player (2022); All-PLK Team (2022); BSN champion (2024); BSN Finals MVP (2024); 2x BSN Most Valuable Player (2024, 2026); Third-team All-Big Ten (2015)
- Stats at Basketball Reference

Travis Lamar Trice II (born January 22, 1993) is an American professional basketball player for the Criollos de Caguas of the Baloncesto Superior Nacional (BSN). He played college basketball for the Michigan State Spartans, leading his team in points during the 2014–15 NCAA Division I men's basketball season. He attended Wayne High School in Huber Heights, Ohio, where he played under his father, Travis Trice Sr.

== Early life ==
Trice was born on January 22, 1993, to Travis Sr. and Julie Trice. Julie's pregnancy marked the abrupt end of her successful high school track career and a potential athletics scholarship to University of North Carolina at Wilmington. She later said, "People were telling me I should get an abortion after I got pregnant. People have been saying 'No, no, no, no, no' to him forever." She had her son at about 18 years of age, while she was a senior in high school and her husband was still attending college. In Julie's 41st week of pregnancy, her son's heartbeat flatlined and she was immediately rushed in for a C-section operation. According to Washington Post, Trice was born with "the umbilical cord tangled around his ankles," but survived.

Trice fell in love with basketball at a young age, but also actively played baseball and football in his childhood. He said, "I liked baseball, but I didn't like all the standing around." Trice officially began basketball in middle school, after watching his friends play on the team. He played quarterback in middle school football, but was strongly compared to his friend Braxton Miller. His mother recalled the situation to the Detroit Free Press, "No, you aren't big enough. No, you aren't quick enough. You're a good middle school quarterback, but not as good as your best friend." Miller would go on to play football at a high level for the Ohio State Buckeyes.

== High school career ==
Trice attended Wayne High School in Huber Heights, Ohio. He averaged 16.5 points per game as a sophomore in 2009, garnering all-district and all-conference honors. The guard saw considerable improvement in the junior year that followed. In his third season playing for Wayne, Trice averaged 22.1 points, 4.9 assists, and 4.2 steals, shooting 43% from long range. He would be named district underclassman of the year on two occasions and conference player of the year. He also was a third-team All-State honoree. Trice saw even more success as a senior in 2011. After averaging 23.5 points, 6.5 assists, 4.3 steals, and 3.3 rebounds in his final season in a Wayne uniform, he was named Gatorade Ohio Boys' Basketball Player of the Year. The point guard also earned first-team All-State and District Player of the Year accolades. He shot .481 from the field and .425 on three-pointers. Trice's contributions helped the Warriors reach a 22–2 record and a district finals appearance by the end of the season. He went on to become the school's all-time leading scorer, recording a total of 1,555 points representing the Warriors.

Upon completion of his high school years, Trice was listed as a three-star recruit by Rivals.com. Scout.com gave him two stars, while ESPN ranked him as the 55th best point guard in the Class of 2011. Rivals scout Brian Snow commented on his strong play with his Amateur Athletic Union (AAU) program, "Trice is the huge x-factor for them. In the semi-finals there is absolutely no way that SYF gets past King James if not for the play of Trice. He was making shots, getting to the rim, and setting up teammates very well."

Trice's small size came across as the biggest drawback. However, Michigan State men's basketball head coach Tom Izzo began recruiting him after noticing him on Branden Dawson's AAU team. Dawson, who would later become Trice's teammate with the Spartans, was a far more touted prospect. Izzo commented on Trice, who stood 5 ft 11 in (1.80 m) and 160 lbs (73 kg) at the time, saying he was "too skinny" and "too small." He also said, "He was too this and too that. But, unbelievable family, a dad who's a coach, just an ability to win." Trice verbally committed to Michigan State on August 4, 2010, despite receiving offers from Butler, Creighton, Dayton, Minnesota, Northern Iowa, Northwestern, Penn State, and Richmond. His family had visited the university in the days prior and heard from Izzo that Trice would likely be a significant part of the team as a freshman. The point guard said to the Lansing State Journal, "I took it as hard work pays off, and I'm a hard worker. Throughout the whole day I (thought) this is too good to be true...I got to spend time with the (players) and watched them work out. I was like 'Man, I could see myself here.'" Gary native and five-star forward Dawson committed to the same program on August 5 as well.

College recruiting
Name	Hometown	School	Height	Weight	Commit date
Travis Trice; PG	Dayton, Ohio	Wayne	5 ft 11 in (1.80 m)	160 lb (73 kg)	Aug 4, 2010
Travis Trice; PG	Recruit ratings: Rivals: 247Sports: (90)				
Overall recruit ranking: Rivals: 110 (SF)
Note: In many cases, Scout, Rivals, 247Sports, On3, and ESPN may conflict in their listings of height and weight.; In these cases, the average was taken. ESPN grades are on a 100-point scale.; Sources: "Michigan St Spartans 2011 Player Commits". ESPN.; "2011 Team Ranking". Rivals.

== College career ==
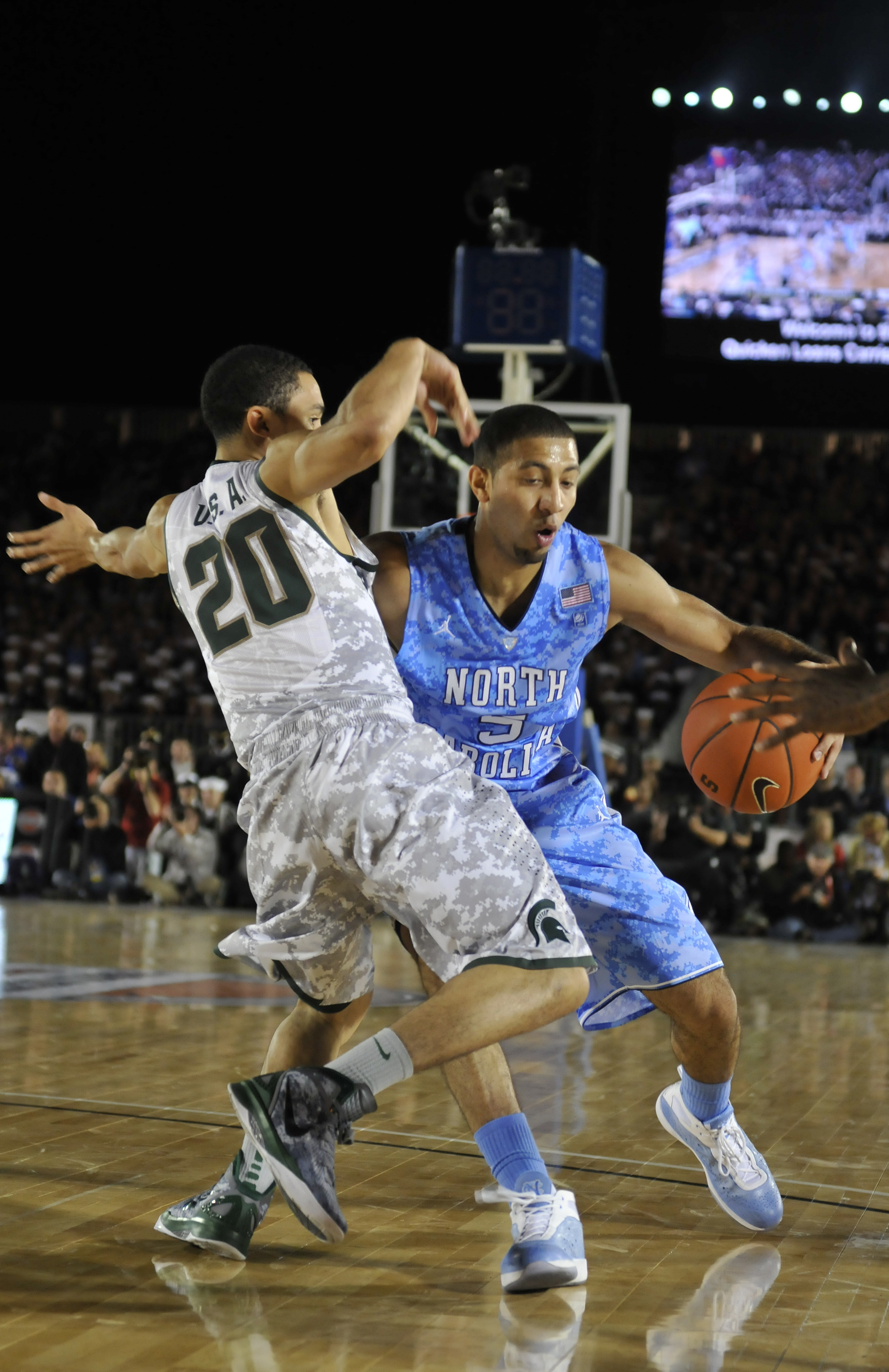
Trice defending Kendall Marshall in November 2011

On October 30, 2011, Trice made his debut for Michigan State in an exhibition game against Ferris State University, a Division II school in the field of basketball. The guard recorded 7 points and 4 rebounds in 18 minutes. After the Spartans topped the Bulldogs with a score of 85–58, coach Tom Izzo commented on his freshmen's play. About Trice, he said, "Today I jumped Travis a little bit. I watched [Draymond Green] go right over and put his arm around him and talk to him." Trice made his first official appearance with the team on November 11, 2011, in a Carrier Classic showdown vs North Carolina. He was allowed 20 minutes on the court, but 1-of-8 shooting limited him to 4 points throughout the game. He went for 11 points and 5 rebounds off the bench the following week on November 18 against Texas Southern, the most he had scored in a single college basketball game until that point in time. However, on December 7 of the same year, in a home contest vs Central Connecticut, he broke that record, adding 20 points despite not being a starter. Izzo noted, "When you really look at it, Trice looked good...give Travis credit." He would hold the number as his season-high scoring performance. He suffered from a brain infection as a freshman that drained his energy and caused him to sleep 12 hours a day.

In December 2013, trainer Quinton Sawyer removed a blister on Trice's foot. When the pain didn't subside, it was discovered that there was another blister underneath it. "As soon as I cut that one open, I felt great," Trice said. He shot 43.4 percent on 3-pointers as a junior, third best in the Big 10.

As a senior, Trice enjoyed a breakout season, averaging a team-high 15.3 points per game and dished out team-high 197 assists. He helped lead Michigan State to the Final Four that year. Trice was a third-team All-Big Ten honoree. After defeating the Louisville Cardinals in the Elite Eight, Trice was named East Region Most Outstanding Player.

== Professional career ==
=== 2015–16 season ===
After going undrafted in the 2015 NBA draft, Trice joined the Miami Heat for 2015 NBA Summer League. On September 22, 2015, he signed with the New York Knicks. However, he was later waived by the Knicks on October 23 after appearing in two preseason games. On November 2, 2015, he was acquired by the Westchester Knicks of the NBA Development League as an affiliate player of New York. In 51 games for Westchester in 2015–16, he averaged 15.3 points, 3.5 rebounds, 5.7 assists and 1.4 steals per game.

=== 2016–17 season ===
On August 5, 2016, Trice signed with the Cairns Taipans for the 2016–17 NBL season. On November 27, 2016, he scored a season-high 31 points in a 91–80 win over the New Zealand Breakers. On February 12, 2017, he was recognised for his standout season by claiming the Cairns Taipans MVP. In 26 games for the Taipans, he averaged 14.6 points, 3.0 rebounds, 3.5 assists and 1.2 steals per game. On February 28, 2017, Trice was acquired by the Westchester Knicks, returning to the franchise for a second stint. In nine games for the Knicks, he averaged 21.1 points, 3.6 rebounds and 6.4 assists per game.

=== 2017–18 season ===
On July 5, 2017, Trice signed with the Brisbane Bullets for the 2017–18 NBL season. Prior to joining the Bullets, he played for the Milwaukee Bucks' Summer League team in Las Vegas. In 27 games for the Bullets, he averaged 15.5 points, 3.6 rebounds, 5.1 assists and 1.3 steals per game.

On March 6, 2018, Trice signed with Champville SC of the Lebanese Basketball League.

=== 2018–19 season ===
On July 31, Trice signed a training camp contract with the Milwaukee Bucks. On September 17, 2018, Trice was waived by the Bucks. Trice was added to the opening night roster of the Wisconsin Herd on November 1, 2018.

On January 16, 2019, Trice was traded to Austin Spurs.

On April 2, 2019, Tofaş of the Basketball Super League announced that they had signed Trice.

=== 2019–20 season ===
On July 21, 2019, Trice signed with SIG Strasbourg of the LNB Pro A. On January 15, 2020, he signed with Germani Brescia of the Lega Basket Serie A.

=== 2020–21 season ===
On December 29, 2020, Trice signed with Galatasaray of the Turkish Basketball Super League (BSL).

=== 2021–22 season ===
On July 21, 2021, Trice signed with the Illawarra Hawks for the 2021–22 NBL season. He was later released by the Hawks on September 21, 2021.

On October 18, 2021, he has signed with Śląsk Wrocław of the Polish Basketball League. He led the club to its first domestic championship in 20 years, while being awarded MVP both for the regular season and the finals.

=== 2023–24 season ===
On March 11, 2024, Trice signed with Criollos de Caguas of the Baloncesto Superior Nacional. On July 11, 2024, the league announced the end of season award winners; with Travis Trice being named the league's Most Valuable Player.

The Criollos made the 2024 BSN Finals against the Osos de Manati. In Game 2, with the Criollos down by three points, Trice made a buzzer-beater, half-court shot to tie the game and send it to over-time. The Criollos eventually won the game, 109–104, with Trice making another key three-point shot during the overtime. The Criollos won the championship, 4 games to 3. Trice was named finals MVP.

== Career statistics ==
Legend
GP	Games played	GS	Games started	MPG	Minutes per game
FG%	Field goal percentage	3P%	3-point field goal percentage	FT%	Free throw percentage
RPG	Rebounds per game	APG	Assists per game	SPG	Steals per game
BPG	Blocks per game	PPG	Points per game	**Bold**	Career high

=== College ===
Year	Team	GP	GS	MPG	FG%	3P%	FT%	RPG	APG	SPG	BPG	PPG
2011–12	Michigan State	32	0	17.2	.381	.405	.576	1.8	1.8	.8	.1	4.5
2012–13	Michigan State	27	0	18.6	.320	.403	.720	1.6	1.9	.9	.0	4.8
2013–14	Michigan State	36	8	22.3	**.420**	**.434**	**.818**	1.6	2.3	.9	**.2**	7.3
2014–15	Michigan State	**39**	**33**	**33.6**	.397	.369	.715	**3.2**	**5.1**	**1.0**	**.2**	**15.3**
Career		134	41	23.6	.390	.395	.715	2.1	2.9	.9	.1	8.5

== Personal ==
Trice is the son of Travis Trice Sr., who played two years of basketball with Purdue and Butler. Trice's father is currently the head coach at his son's alma mater, Huber Heights' Wayne High School. On March 28, 2015, Trice Sr. led them to an Ohio High School Athletic Association (OHSAA) Division I title, with a victory over Westerville South High School. When he was in high school himself, growing up in Princeton, Indiana, he was one of the best point guards in the Class of 1990. At Butler, he would play under Barry Collier and Thad Matta, turning down offers to play with Tim Duncan at Wake Forest and for John Calipari and with Marcus Camby at Massachusetts. Trice Sr. declined a scholarship offer from Lute Olson at the University of Arizona primarily because superstar Khalid Reeves had accepted just before. His younger brother D'Mitrik Trice played basketball for the Wisconsin Badgers men's basketball team.

Trice Jr.'s grandfather, Bob Pritchett, competed at the same level for Vincennes University and Old Dominion. On April 29, 2008, Pritchett was inducted into the Old Dominion University Sports Hall of Fame. With the Monarchs, he scored 1,188 career points in 50 games, also breaking the school's single-game scoring record against the Richmond Professional Institute, with 67 points. Pritchett was brought up in Princeton, Indiana, the same city as his son-in-law, Travis Trice Sr. Trice, Jr's uncle, his mother's brother, Matt Pritchett, played left tackle at the United States Naval Academy from 2005 to 2006. His father's cousin, Jackie Young, is one of the most coveted high school recruits in the nation, competing for Princeton High School in Princeton, Indiana. She chose to play basketball for Notre Dame.

== See also ==
- Angelo Cruz - who once made a shot similar to Trice's on the BSN playoffs
