= Louis King (basketball) =

American basketball player (born 1999)

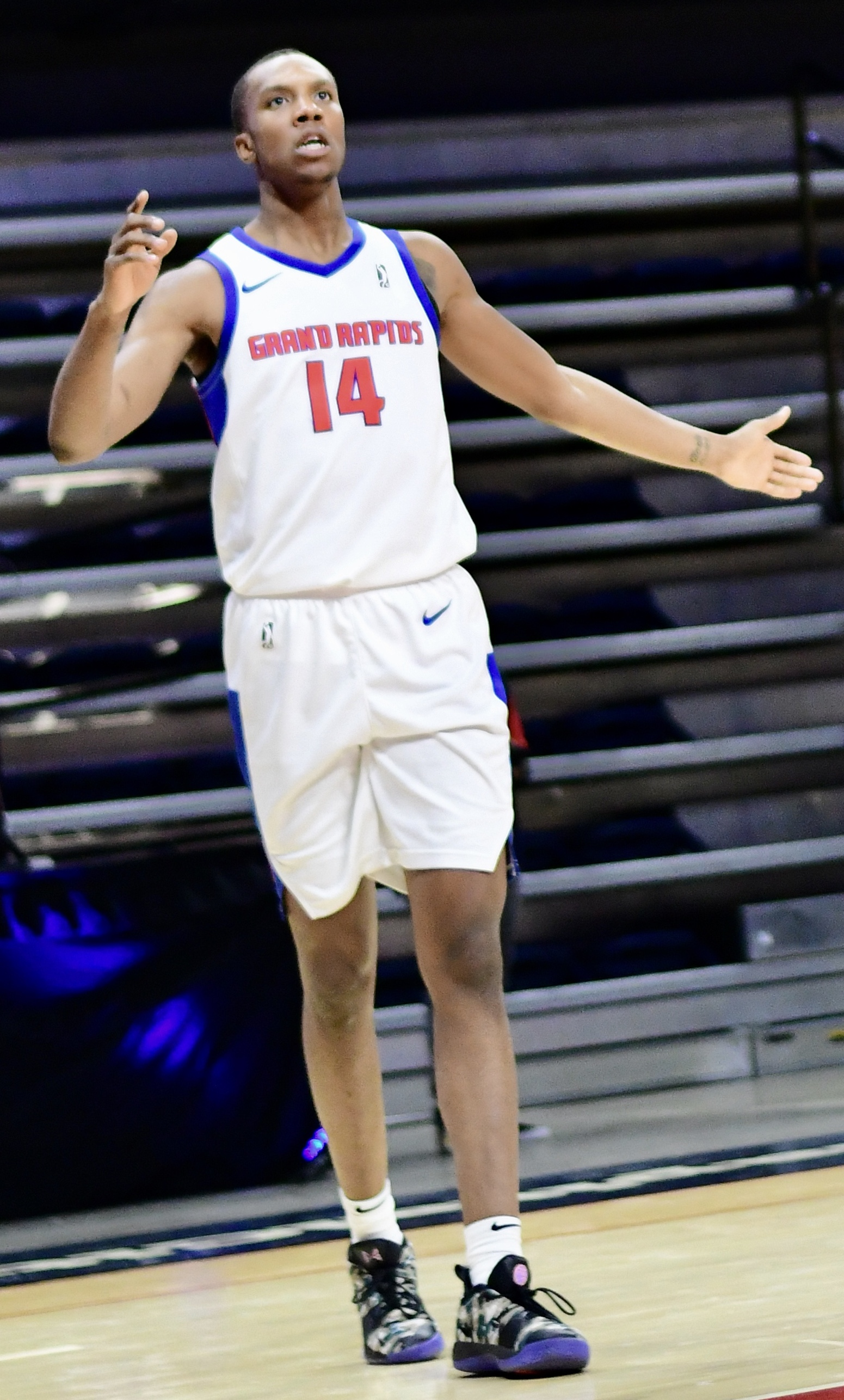
- King in 2019

No. 23 – Busan KCC Egis
- Position: Small forward
- League: KBL

Personal information
- Born: April 6, 1999 (age 27) Jersey City, New Jersey, U.S.
- Listed height: 6 ft 7 in (2.01 m)
- Listed weight: 205 lb (93 kg)

Career information
- High school: Roselle Catholic (Roselle, New Jersey); Pope John XXIII (Sparta, New Jersey); Hudson Catholic (Jersey City, New Jersey)
- College: Oregon (2018–2019)
- NBA draft: 2019: undrafted
- Playing career: 2019–present

Career history
- 2019–2020: Detroit Pistons
- 2019–2020: →Grand Rapids Drive
- 2021: Westchester Knicks
- 2021–2022: Sacramento Kings
- 2021–2022: →Stockton Kings
- 2022: Westchester Knicks
- 2022: Rio Grande Valley Vipers
- 2022–2023: Philadelphia 76ers
- 2022–2023: →Delaware Blue Coats
- 2023–2024: South Bay Lakers
- 2024: Mexico City Capitanes
- 2024–2026: Criollos de Caguas
- 2024: Mexico City Capitanes
- 2024–2025: Fujian Sturgeons
- 2026–present: Busan KCC Egis

Career highlights
- NBA G League champion (2023); BSN champion (2024); 2x BSN All Star (2025, 2026); Pac-12 All-Freshman Team (2019); McDonald's All-American (2018); Nike Hoop Summit (2018)
- Stats at NBA.com
- Stats at Basketball Reference
Medals
Men's basketball
Representing the United States
FIBA U19 World Cup
Bronze medal – third place	2017 Egypt	National team

Louis D'ajon King (born April 6, 1999) is an American professional basketball player for the Busan KCC Egis of the Korean Basketball League (KBL). He played college basketball for the Oregon Ducks.

== High school career ==
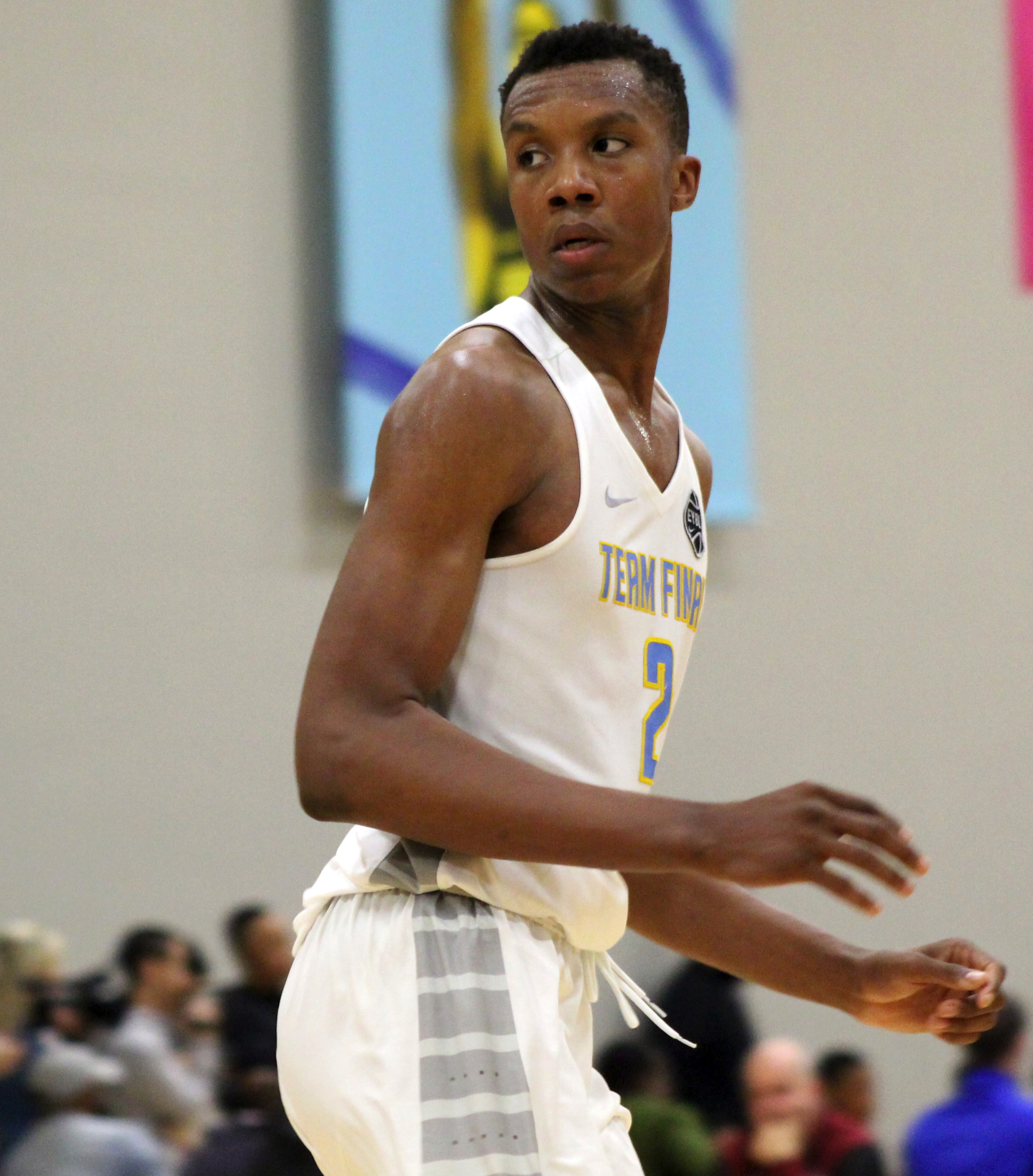
King in 2017

Born in Secaucus, New Jersey as one of eight children, King attended Roselle Catholic High School for his freshman year and Pope John XXIII Regional High School as a sophomore, before transferring to Hudson Catholic Regional High School in Jersey City, New Jersey mid-year, where he had to sit out for the remainder of the season. At Hudson Catholic, he was teammates with Jahvon Quinerly. Prior to the 2017–18 season, he was named to the Naismith Prep Player of the Year Award watch list. During his senior year, he suffered a knee injury after landing awkwardly after a dunk. Despite a shortened season, King averaged 15.2 points and 4.4 rebounds. He was named to the 2018 McDonald's All-American team and invited to the 2018 Nike Hoop Summit, but was not able to participate due to the injury.

=== Recruiting ===
King was ranked among the top 25 prospects of the 2018 recruiting class by Rivals, 247Sports, and ESPN. He was also ranked as one of the top prospects in his state and at his position by all three scouting services.

College recruiting
Name	Hometown	School	Height	Weight	Commit date
Louis King; SF	Columbus, NJ	Hudson Catholic (NJ)	6 ft 7 in (2.01 m)	198 lb (90 kg)	Sep 21, 2017
Louis King; SF	Recruit ratings: Rivals: 247Sports: ESPN: (93)				
Overall recruit ranking: Rivals: 25 247Sports: 24 ESPN: 11
Note: In many cases, Scout, Rivals, 247Sports, On3, and ESPN may conflict in their listings of height and weight.; In these cases, the average was taken. ESPN grades are on a 100-point scale.; Sources: "Oregon 2018 Basketball Commitments". Rivals.; "2018 Oregon Ducks Recruiting Class". ESPN.; "2018 Team Ranking". Rivals.

== College career ==
On September 21, 2017, King verbally committed to playing college basketball at Oregon. He picked Oregon over Kansas, Seton Hall, Purdue, and NC State. He averaged 13.5 points and 5.5 rebounds per game and was named to the Pac-12 All-Freshman team. His play was hampered however by hand and ankle injuries. Following the season he declared for the 2019 NBA draft.

== Professional career ==
=== Detroit Pistons (2019–2020) ===
After going undrafted in the 2019 NBA draft, King signed a two-way contract with the Detroit Pistons. On December 2, 2020, King signed a second two-way contract, but was waived on December 14.

=== Westchester Knicks (2021) ===
On December 17, 2020, King was signed by the New York Knicks, and was then waived.

On January 21, 2021, King signed as an affiliate player with the Westchester Knicks for the NBA G League season, making his debut on February 10. In 15 games, he averaged 13.7 points, 4.9 rebounds, 3.0 assists and 1.5 steals in 32.2 minutes while shooting .456 from three, which ranked sixth overall in the league.

=== Sacramento Kings (2021–2022) ===
On May 1, 2021, King signed a two-way contract with the Sacramento Kings. On February 17, 2022, he was waived by the Kings.

=== Return to Westchester (2022) ===
On February 25, 2022, King was reacquired by the Westchester Knicks.

King joined the Phoenix Suns for the 2022 NBA Summer League.

=== Rio Grande Valley Vipers (2022) ===
On November 3, 2022, King was named to the opening night roster for the Rio Grande Valley Vipers.

=== Philadelphia 76ers (2022–2023) ===
On December 26, 2022, King signed a two-way contract with the Philadelphia 76ers, splitting time with their NBA G League affiliate, the Delaware Blue Coats, eventually helping Delaware win a title.

=== South Bay Lakers (2023–2024) ===
On October 18, 2023, King signed with the Los Angeles Lakers, but was waived the next day. On October 28, he joined the South Bay Lakers.

=== Mexico City Capitanes (2024) ===
On March 1, 2024, King was acquired by the Mexico City Capitanes in exchange of a 2025 first-round pick.

=== Criollos de Caguas (2024) ===
On March 27, 2024, King signed with the Criollos de Caguas of the Baloncesto Superior Nacional.

=== Return to Mexico City (2024) ===
On October 28, 2024, King signed with the Mexico City Capitanes. However, he left the team on December 20 after playing in 14 games.

=== Fujian Sturgeons (2024–2025) ===
On December 20, 2024, King signed with the Fujian Sturgeons of the Chinese Basketball Association.

On November 6, 2025, King signed with the Xinjiang Flying Tigers of the Chinese Basketball Association. On December 12, he left the team.

=== Criollos de Caguas (2026) ===
King returned for the start of the 2026 BSN season. He joined Travis Trice and Moses Brown as the three imports. He was selected as a starter for the 2026 BSN All-Star Game. On May 25, 2026, King had his best game of the season, having a near triple-double performance. He scored 23 points, 12 rebounds, and 9 assists in a close win against the Mets de Guaynabo 104-101.

== National team career ==
King represented the United States at the 2017 FIBA U19 World Cup in Cairo, Egypt. He averaged 6.1 points, 4.4 rebounds, and 2.1 assists during the tournament, helping the team win the bronze medal.

== Career statistics ==
Legend
GP	Games played	GS	Games started	MPG	Minutes per game
FG%	Field goal percentage	3P%	3-point field goal percentage	FT%	Free throw percentage
RPG	Rebounds per game	APG	Assists per game	SPG	Steals per game
BPG	Blocks per game	PPG	Points per game	**Bold**	Career high

=== NBA ===
Year	Team	GP	GS	MPG	FG%	3P%	FT%	RPG	APG	SPG	BPG	PPG
2019–20	Detroit	**10**	0	6.2	.381	.364	.000	1.0	.5	.2	.0	2.0
2020–21	Sacramento	6	**1**	14.2	.500	.364	**1.000**	3.4	1.5	**1.2**	**.5**	7.3
2021–22	Sacramento	**10**	0	10.4	.319	.296	.700	1.2	.9	.2	.1	4.5
2022–23	Philadelphia	1	0	**29.0**	**.615**	**.500**	.000	**4.0**	**2.0**	1.0	.0	**20.0**
Career		27	1	10.4	.417	.351	.650	1.6	.9	.4	.1	4.8

=== College ===
Year	Team	GP	GS	MPG	FG%	3P%	FT%	RPG	APG	SPG	BPG	PPG
2018–19	Oregon	31	28	30.4	.435	.386	.785	5.5	1.3	.9	.2	13.5

== Personal life ==
Louis' parents are Louis and Ativea King. He went to Northern Burlington Middle School in Columbus, New Jersey for both years where he dominated the school basketball team.
