= Isaac Sosa =

Puerto Rican basketball player

Isaac Sosa Carrion
No. 00 – Osos de Manatí
- Position: Shooting guard
- League: BSN

Personal information
- Born: February 16, 1990 (age 36) San Juan, Puerto Rico
- Listed height: 6 ft 3 in (1.91 m)
- Listed weight: 180 lb (82 kg)

Career information
- High school: Grandview Prep, FL
- College: Canisius (2010–2013)
- NBA draft: 2013: undrafted
- Playing career: 2013–present

Career history
- 2013: Indios de Mayaguez
- 2013–2014: AOK Ikaroi Serron
- 2014–2015: Boca Juniors
- 2015–2016: Cangrejeros de Santurce
- 2016–2017: Leones de Ponce
- 2017–2019: Atleticos de San German
- 2019–2020: Legia Warsaw
- 2020–2021: Astros de Jalisco
- 2021–2023: Cangrejeros de Santurce
- 2023–2025: Osos de Manatí
- 2025–2026: Gigantes de Carolina
- 2026–present: Osos de Manatí

Isaac Sosa Carrion (born February 16, 1990) is a Puerto Rican professional basketball player for Osos de Manatí of the Baloncesto Superior Nacional (BSN). He played collegiate basketball at UCF and Canisius University, and his professional career includes stops in Greece, Argentina, Brazil, Mexico, Poland, and Puerto Rico. He represents Puerto Rico internationally.

== Early life ==
Sosa played high school basketball at Grandview Prep (FL) where he averaged 19.5 ppg, 6.5 rpg, and 6.0 apg. He earned the Florida Class 1A All-State First Team honors as a senior while leading Grandview Prep to the state final and a 28-2 record. Additionally, he was recognized as the South Florida Sun-Sentinel 3A-2A-1A Player of the Year and the Palm Beach Post Small School Player of the Year.

== College career ==
Sosa began his college career at the University of Central Florida. In 96 career games he averaged 8.8 points per game.

His freshman season (2008-2009) he played in all 31 games, with 8 starts. He also was named to the Conference USA’s academic honor roll. He averaged 8.2 ppg in 19.7 minutes per game, and shot 45% from three-point range.

In his sophomore season, Sosa played in all 32 games, making 14 starts. He averaged a team-high 10.3 points and led the conference in three-point field goal percentage at 42.7%. He was named to the Conference USA All-Academic team.

In his junior season, he again earned a spot on the Conference USA All-Academic Team. He appeared in all 33 games, making 15 starts. He ranked third on the team in scoring at 8.0 points per game while shooting 39.2 percent from deep. This would be good for a ranking of sixth in Conference USA for 3-point field-goal percentage.

Following his junior year, Sosa would elect to transfer to Canisius University to continue his athletic and academic career. He started all 34 games his senior year after sitting out per the transfer rules. He averaged 11.5 ppg in 25 minutes per game.

== Professional career ==
Sosa began his professional career with Indios de Mayagüez of the Baloncesto Superior Nacional in 2013. He averaged 6.0 ppg in 10.1 minutes.

He then played two games in Greece for Ikaroi Serron of the Greek Basket League. Following that he spent two seasons in Argentina’s La Liga Argentina for Penarol. The first year he averaged 8.4 ppg in 16.8 mpg and the following year he posted 7.4 ppg in 14.8 mpg.

After that, Sosa returned to the Baloncesto Superior Nacional and the Indios. He scored 7.0 ppg in 6.6 mpg.

He returned to Argentina to play for Boca Juniors. There he averaged 12.3 ppg in 24.8 mpg.

He played for three different BSN teams after that. In 2015 he played for Santurce and averaged 5.8 ppg in 16.2 mpg. In 2016 he played for Leones de Ponce and averaged 4.0 ppg in 13.4 mpg. In 2017 he joined Atléticos de San Germán and averaged 12.7 ppg in 25.8 mpg.

As of 2025, he still plays for Osos de Manatí.
