= Ricardo Cruz Lebrón =

Ricardo "Dickie" Cruz Lebrón (15 August 1933 – 10 May 2020) was a Puerto Rican basketball player, national team member, sports administrator, and radio broadcaster. He played as a standout guard for the Criollos de Caguas in the Baloncesto Superior Nacional (BSN) and was later recognized for his lasting contributions to Puerto Rican basketball on and off the court.

== Early life and education ==
Cruz Lebrón was born in San Juan, Puerto Rico, on 15 August 1933. He completed his primary and secondary education at the University High School (UHS) in Río Piedras and later earned a bachelor's degree in Business Administration from the University of Puerto Rico in 1965, including a commission through the university’s ROTC program.

== Playing career ==
Cruz began playing basketball in the "Futuras Estrellas" tournaments organized by the FIB, where he helped lead the Santa Rita Cardenales of Río Piedras to back-to-back national championships in 1947 and 1948. He later played for Hato Rey Cabrer, where he set a then-record by scoring 35 points in a single game, and was named Most Outstanding Rookie in a local tournament with Farmacia Río Piedras.

He made his debut in Puerto Rico’s top-tier league in 1951 with the Cardenales de Río Piedras, becoming a star player through the 1950s and retiring in 1960. He played a key role in leading the team to **three consecutive national championships** in 1955, 1956, and 1957.

Internationally, Cruz was selected to represent the Puerto Rico men's national basketball team in the 1954 Central American and Caribbean Games in Mexico. In 1955, he set a scoring record with 56 points in a game in Arecibo and was later named the league’s best defensive player. In 1957, he was named to the league’s All-Star team as one of its scoring leaders. He also played in the Caribbean Series with the team from Ponce in 1958.

He was a member of the UPR varsity basketball team during the 1954–1955 intercollegiate season.

== Sports administration and broadcasting ==
After retiring as a player, Cruz remained involved with the sport, serving as **Director of Youth Categories** in the Puerto Rican Basketball Federation from 1960 to 1963, and then as the **Federation's Executive Secretary** from 1963 to 1966.

He was named **Head of Delegation** for Puerto Rico’s basketball team at the **1964 Tokyo Olympics**, where Puerto Rico achieved a historic fourth-place finish—its highest Olympic placement to date. That same year, Cruz was appointed to the **FIBA Technical Commission**.

In 1965, he served as Puerto Rico’s **delegate** at the inaugural **Central American Basketball Tournament** in Mexico, where the team won silver. In 1966, he acted as **Technical Director** of basketball during the Central American and Caribbean Games held in Puerto Rico.

Cruz also had a long career in sports media. He created and hosted two popular basketball radio shows: El Baloncelista Estrella de la Semana and Así va Nuestro Baloncesto, which aired for more than 15 years.

== Professional life and affiliations ==
As of 1988, Cruz Lebrón was the **General Manager** of John Hancock Mutual Life Insurance Co. in Puerto Rico. He was a prominent member of the fraternity Phi Sigma Alpha, where he served as president of the alumni chapter during the late 1960s and early 1970s, and later as fraternity president. He was also a former president of the Rotary International San Juan, Puerto Rico chapter.

== Death ==
Cruz Lebrón died from Alzheimer's disease on 10 May 2020 at the age of 86.
