= Alex Morales =

American basketball player (born 1997)

No. 30 – Orlando Magic
- Position: Shooting guard
- League: NBA

Personal information
- Born: November 21, 1997 (age 28) Paterson, New Jersey, U.S.
- Listed height: 6 ft 6 in (1.98 m)
- Listed weight: 195 lb (88 kg)

Career information
- High school: Manchester Regional (Haledon, New Jersey)
- College: Prince George's CC (2016–2019); Wagner (2019–2022)
- NBA draft: 2022: undrafted
- Playing career: 2022–present

Career history
- 2022–2026: Lakeland / Osceola Magic
- 2023–2024: Osos de Manatí
- 2026–present: Orlando Magic
- 2026–present: →Osceola Magic

Career highlights
- 2× NEC Player of the Year (2021, 2022); 2× First-team All-NEC (2021, 2022); Second-team NJCAA DIII All-American (2019); MJCAC Player of the Year (2019)
- Stats at NBA.com
- Stats at Basketball Reference

Alexander Morales Jr. (born November 21, 1997) is a Puerto Rican professional basketball player for the Orlando Magic of the National Basketball Association (NBA), on a two-way contract with the Osceola Magic of the NBA G League. He played college basketball for the Prince George's CC Owls and the Wagner Seahawks.

== High school career ==
Morales played basketball for Manchester Regional High School in Haledon, New Jersey, where he was a three-time All-State selection and led his team to a state sectional title. He was suspended for his senior season after allegedly being involved in an altercation at school.

== College career ==
Morales averaged 13.8 points and 9.9 rebounds per game as a freshman at Prince George's Community College. He was a National Junior College Athletic Association (NJCAA) Division III Honorable Mention All-American and was named to the Second Team All-Maryland Junior College Athletic Conference. Morales led Prince George's to its first Maryland JUCO Tournament title since 1981, earning MVP honors. He did not play in the next season and was granted a redshirt. As a sophomore, Morales averaged 19.8 points, 11.9 rebounds and 5.5 assists per game. He was named a Second Team NJCAA Division III All-American and Maryland JUCO Player of the Year.

For his junior season, Morales moved to Wagner. As a junior, he averaged 13.6 points, 5.8 rebounds and 3.1 assists per game. Morales was named NEC Player of the Year as a senior, averaging 16.8 points, 7.2 rebounds and 4.3 assists per game. On April 16, 2021, he declared for the 2021 NBA draft while maintaining his college eligibility. Morales ultimately returned for his additional season of eligibility. He was again named NEC Player of the Year as well as Defensive Player of the Year.

== Professional career ==
=== Lakeland Magic (2022–2023) ===
After going undrafted in the 2022 NBA draft, Morales joined the Orlando Magic for training camp, however he did not make the final roster. On November 3, 2022, Morales was named to the opening night roster for the Lakeland Magic.

=== Osos de Manatí (2023) ===
On March 31, 2023, Morales signed with Osos de Manatí of the Puerto Rican league.

=== Osceola Magic (2023–2024) ===
On September 13, 2023, Morales signed with the Orlando Magic, but was waived two days later. On November 2, he joined the Osceola Magic.

=== Return to Manatí (2024) ===
After the G League season concluded, Morales re-joined the Osos de Manatí.

=== Return to Osceola / Orlando Magic (2024–present) ===
On October 16, 2024, Morales signed once again with the Orlando Magic, but was waived three days later. On October 27, he joined the Osceola Magic.

On February 17, 2026, the Orlando Magic signed Morales to a two-way contract.

== Career statistics ==
Legend
GP	Games played	GS	Games started	MPG	Minutes per game
FG%	Field goal percentage	3P%	3-point field goal percentage	FT%	Free throw percentage
RPG	Rebounds per game	APG	Assists per game	SPG	Steals per game
BPG	Blocks per game	PPG	Points per game	**Bold**	Career high

=== NBA ===
Year	Team	GP	GS	MPG	FG%	3P%	FT%	RPG	APG	SPG	BPG	PPG
2025–26	Orlando	4	0	6.0	.429	.000	1.000	.8	1.0	.0	.0	2.0
Career		4	0	6.0	.429	.000	1.000	.8	1.0	.0	.0	2.0

=== College ===
==== NCAA Division I ====
Year	Team	GP	GS	MPG	FG%	3P%	FT%	RPG	APG	SPG	BPG	PPG
2019–20	Wagner	**28**	**25**	30.6	**.440**	**.366**	.706	5.8	3.1	1.1	.3	13.6
2020–21	Wagner	20	20	**35.4**	**.440**	.317	**.713**	**7.2**	**4.3**	**1.8**	**.5**	**16.8**
Career		48	45	32.6	.440	.343	.709	6.4	3.6	1.4	.4	14.9

==== JUCO ====
Year	Team	GP	GS	MPG	FG%	3P%	FT%	RPG	APG	SPG	BPG	PPG
2016–17	Prince George's CC	26	23	25.2	.469	.158	.590	9.9	3.2	1.4	.6	13.8
2017–18	Prince George's CC	Redshirt										
2018–19	Prince George's CC	**28**	**28**	**33.6**	**.584**	**.426**	**.659**	**11.9**	**5.5**	**3.6**	**.9**	**19.8**
Career		54	51	29.6	.533	.363	.627	11.0	4.4	2.5	.8	16.9
