= Norris Cole =

American basketball player (born 1988)

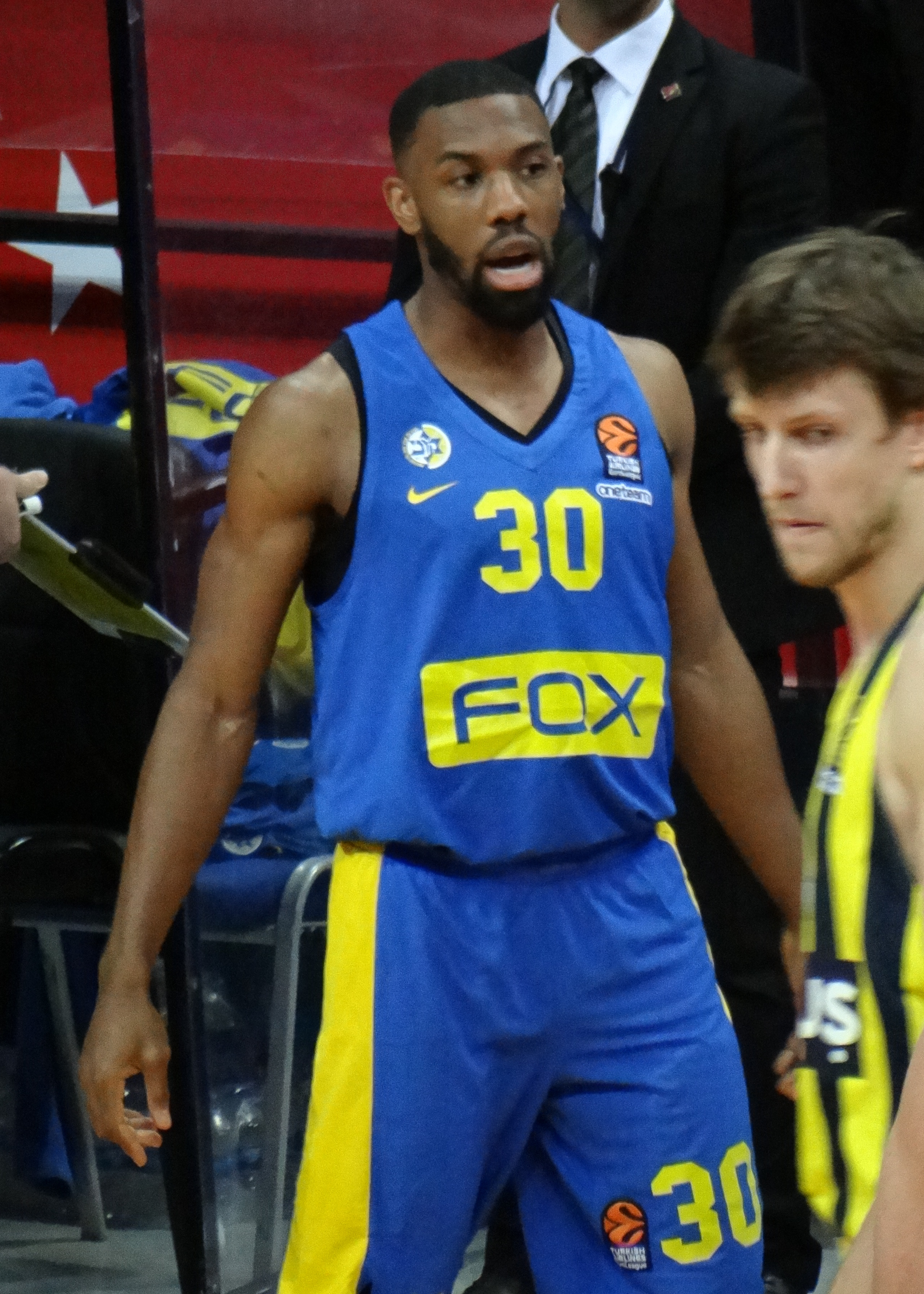
- Cole with Maccabi Tel Aviv in 2018

Sioux Falls Skyforce
- Title: Assistant coach
- League: NBA G League

Personal information
- Born: October 13, 1988 (age 38) Dayton, Ohio, U.S.
- Listed height: 6 ft 2 in (1.88 m)
- Listed weight: 180 lb (82 kg)

Career information
- High school: Dunbar (Dayton, Ohio)
- College: Cleveland State (2007–2011)
- NBA draft: 2011: 1st round, 28th overall pick
- Drafted by: Chicago Bulls
- Playing career: 2011–2026
- Position: Point guard
- Number: 3, 30
- Coaching career: 2025–present

Career history

Playing
- 2011–2015: Miami Heat
- 2015–2016: New Orleans Pelicans
- 2016: Shandong Golden Stars
- 2017: Oklahoma City Thunder
- 2017–2018: Maccabi Tel Aviv
- 2018: Sidigas Avellino
- 2018–2019: Budućnost
- 2019–2020: Monaco
- 2020–2021: ASVEL
- 2021–2022: Unicaja
- 2022: JL Bourg
- 2022: Atléticos de San Germán
- 2022–2023: Grand Rapids Gold
- 2023: Atléticos de San Germán
- 2023: Leones de Ponce
- 2023: Al Ahly
- 2023–2024: NBA G League Ignite
- 2024–2025: Osos de Manatí
- 2026: Peñarol

Coaching
- 2025–2026: Trinity HS (girls) (interim)
- 2026–present: Sioux Falls Skyforce (assistant)

Career highlights
- 2× NBA champion (2012, 2013); Pro A champion (2021); French Cup winner (2021); French League All-Star (2020); Israeli League champion (2018); Israeli League Cup winner (2017); Montenegrin Cup winner (2019); Horizon League Player of the Year (2011); Horizon League Defensive Player of the Year (2011); 2× First-team All-Horizon League (2010, 2011); No. 30 retired by Cleveland State Vikings

Career statistics
- Points: 2,506 (7.0 ppg)
- Rebounds: 702 (2.0 rpg)
- Assists: 981 (2.7 apg)
- Stats at NBA.com
- Stats at Basketball Reference
Medals
Men's basketball
Representing United States
FIBA Americup
Bronze medal – third place	2022 Brazil

Norris Gene Cole II (born October 13, 1988) is an American former professional basketball player, and current assistant coach for the Sioux Falls Skyforce of the NBA G League. A 6-foot-2 point guard, he is a two-time NBA champion, winning back-to-back titles in 2012 and 2013 with the Miami Heat in his first and second years in the NBA. In his seven NBA seasons, Cole made the playoffs all but once (2016).

== Early life ==
Cole was a star at Dunbar High School in Dayton, Ohio, leading his basketball team to consecutive state championships in his junior and senior years. He was a high school teammate of future NBA player Daequan Cook (The two later faced each other in the 2012 NBA Finals).

Cole was set to go to Walsh University on a football scholarship when Cleveland State basketball coach Gary Waters decided to recruit him.

== College career ==
On December 15, 2008, he helped lead Cleveland State to their biggest regular season victory in school history, upsetting the #11 Syracuse Orange, 72–69. It was CSU's third-ever win over a Top 25 ranked opponent, and first ever on the road. They would pick up their fourth and fifth wins over Top 25 opponents later that same season when they won at #17 Butler in the championship game of the Horizon League Tournament 57–54, and then in the first round of the 2009 NCAA tournament when, as the 13th-seeded team in the Midwest bracket, they routed 4th-seeded and #12 Wake Forest by a final score of 84–69. His numbers improved over the course of his college basketball career, which culminated in a senior year that saw him average 21.7 points, 5.8 rebounds, 5.3 assists and 2.2 steals per game, highlighted by a 41-point, 20-rebound, 9-assist performance against Youngstown State.

Cole was recognized for his accomplishments by being the first person in the Horizon League's men's basketball history to be named both Player of the Year and Defensive Player of the Year, earning an AP All-America Honorable Mention, making the USBWA District V team, as well as the National Association of Basketball Coaches District 12 First Team. He was also a finalist for the Wooden Award and a "Final Five" finalist for the Bob Cousy Award.

Cole played 140 career games for Cleveland State, averaging 14.1 points, 3.2 rebounds and 3.3 assists in 29.4 minutes per game. On February 6, 2016, Cole's No. 30 jersey was retired by Cleveland State during a pre-game ceremony.

== Professional career ==
=== Miami Heat (2011–2015) ===
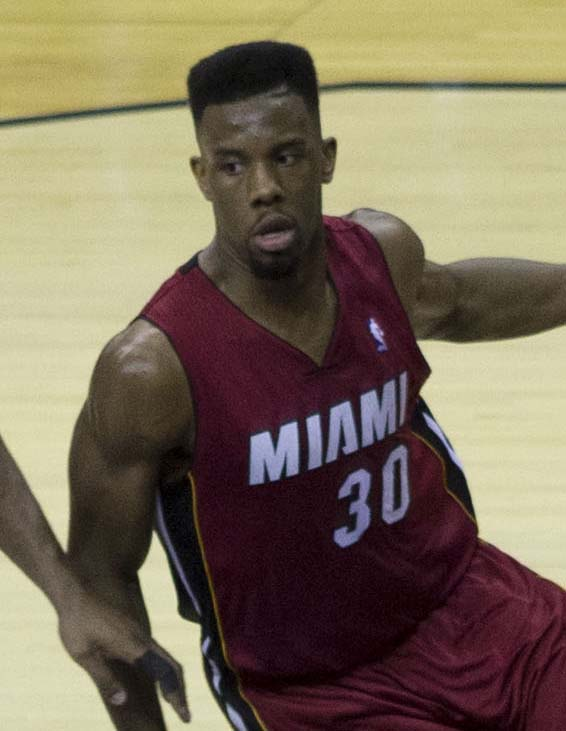
Cole with Miami Heat in 2014

Cole was drafted by the Chicago Bulls in the first round of the 2011 NBA draft as the 28th pick out of Cleveland State, but in a series of draft night deals, his rights were subsequently traded to the Minnesota Timberwolves, who then dealt him to the Miami Heat.

After a solid preseason when he averaged 21.3 points and 8 assists, he impressed a nationwide audience in the Heat's home-opener against the Boston Celtics by scoring 15 points in the fourth quarter (making many crucial shots in the closing minutes) to secure a Heat victory in the face of a Celtics comeback attempt. Cole finished that game with a total of 20 points, 4 assists, 4 rebounds and 3 steals. He became the fourth-fastest rookie in Heat franchise history to score at least 20 points in a game.

Cole was originally left out of the 2012 Rising Stars Challenge, but due to the rising stardom of Jeremy Lin, who was added late to the group, Cole was selected as the 20th rookie in order to even out the competition. He tallied 18 points, 6 assists and 4 steals in the game.

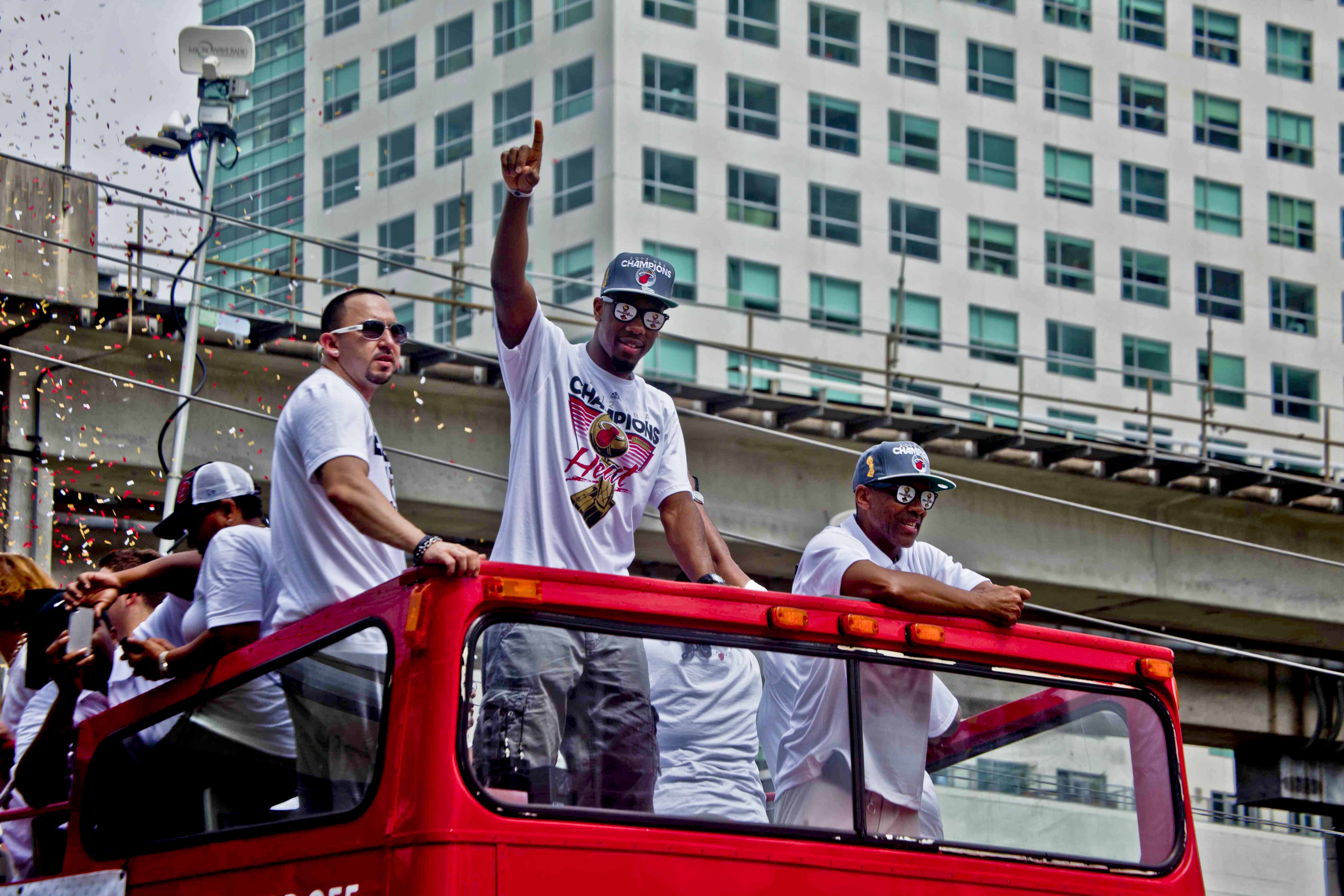
Cole (center) during the Heat's 2012 Championship Parade in Miami

Cole finished the 2011–12 season averaging 6.8 points, 1.4 rebounds and 2.0 assists on 39% shooting, serving as the team's backup point guard behind Mario Chalmers. He made two crucial three-pointers in game 4 of the 2012 NBA Finals which would spark a comeback run. Cole won his first championship in his rookie season after the Miami Heat defeated the Oklahoma City Thunder 4–1.

Cole played in 80 games in the 2012–2013 season, including 4 starts, and averaged 5.6 points and 2.1 assists. In the playoffs, Cole averaged 6 points a game, including two straight 18-point games against the Chicago Bulls in games 2 and 3 of their second-round series. He would be ejected from game 7 of the 2013 Eastern Conference Finals by referee Ken Mauer after a shoving match with Indiana Pacers forward Jeff Pendergraph, who was also ejected late in the fourth quarter during a 26-point Miami Heat lead. Miami would advance to the Finals, Cole's second trip. Miami pushed the San Antonio Spurs to 7 games and won the title for Cole's second championship.

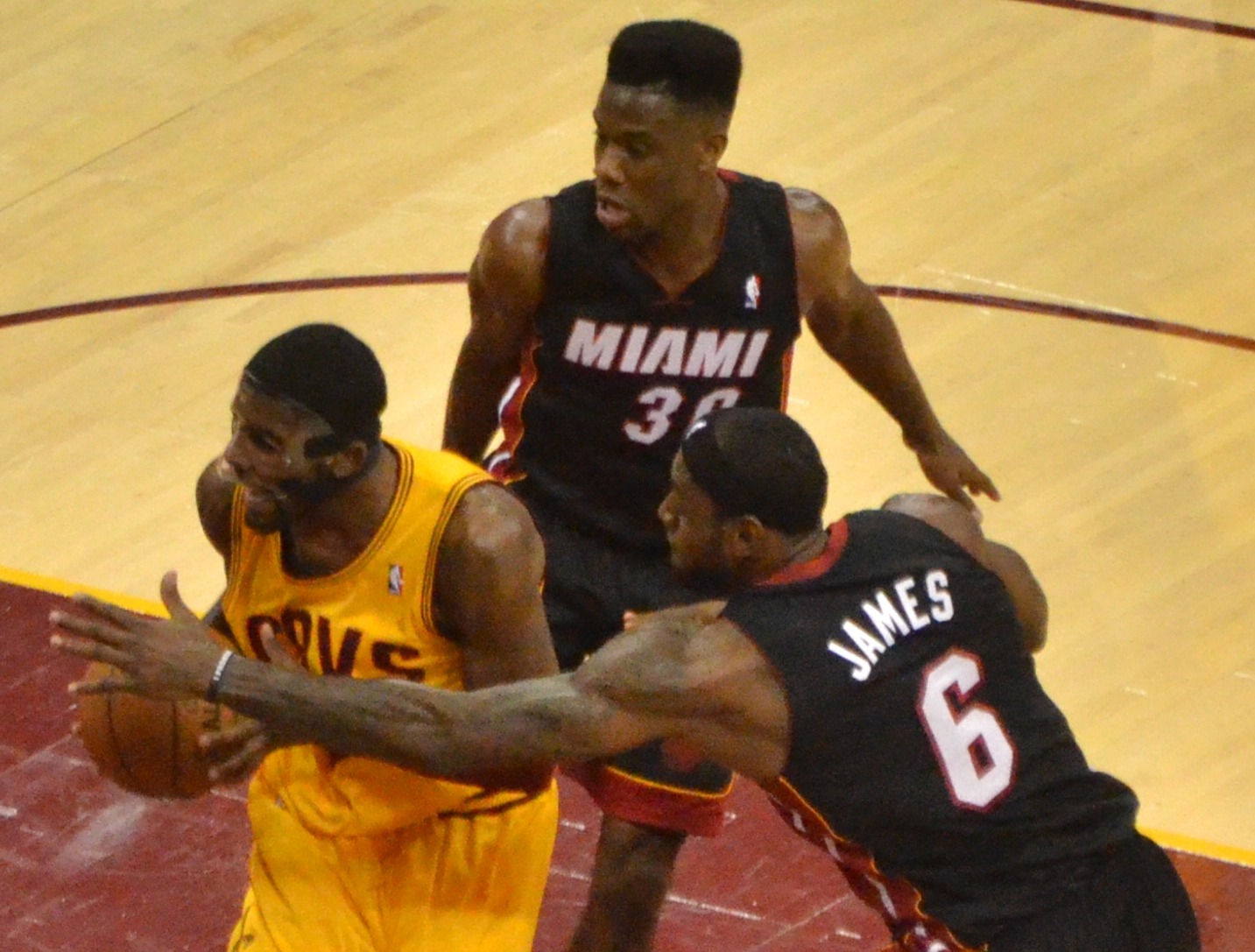
Cole in a game with teammate LeBron James and opposing point guard Kyrie Irving of the Cleveland Cavaliers

In the 2013–2014 season, Cole played in all 82 games and started in six games, averaging 6.4 points and 3 assists per game. In the playoffs, Cole scored 13 points in game 4 of the Heat's first-round sweep of the Charlotte Bobcats, and would not score in double figures again until Miami's crucial game 2 victory against the Pacers in the Eastern Conference Finals, posting 11 points with two three-point baskets. Miami defeated Indiana 4 games to 2 to advance to their fourth straight Finals and Cole's third. The Heat would once again face the San Antonio Spurs in the 2014 NBA Finals, but Miami would lose the series in five games. Cole was the only Heat player who had a contract going through the 2014–15 season.

On October 29, 2014, Cole started his first opening-night game and subsequently scored a career-high 23 points in the 107–95 win over the Washington Wizards. In 47 games played and started 23 games with Heat in 2014–15 regular season, Cole averaged 6.3 points, 3.5 assists, 2.3 rebounds, .9 steals, and playing 24.4 minutes per game before being traded.

=== New Orleans Pelicans (2015–2016) ===
On February 19, 2015, Cole was traded to the New Orleans Pelicans in a three-team trade involving the Phoenix Suns. Two days later, he made his debut for the Pelicans against his former team, the Miami Heat. In just under 30 minutes off the bench, he recorded 12 points, 6 rebounds and 3 assists in a 105–91 win. Cole became a replacement for the injured Jrue Holiday. The Pelicans made the playoffs but were swept in their first-round match-up against the eventual champions, the Golden State Warriors. In the 2014–15 playoffs Cole averaged 8.8 points, 1.8 assists, 1.8 rebounds, 26.5 minutes per game; in 28 games played during the regular season (with the Pelicans), he averaged 9.9 points, 3.2 assists, 1.8 rebounds, with 44.4% shooting and 37.8% three-point shooting on 24.4 minutes per game.

In June 2015, the Pelicans tendered a $3.037 million qualifying offer to make Cole a restricted free agent. On September 17, 2015, Cole re-signed with the Pelicans, accepting the one-year, $3.03 million qualifying offer. On December 1, Cole played his first game of the 2015–16 season after missing the Pelicans' first 17 games with a left ankle injury. In just under 23 minutes of action off the bench, he scored 11 points in a loss to the Memphis Grizzlies, as the Pelicans dropped to a 4–14 win–loss record to start the season. On January 2, 2016, he recorded his second career double-double with 16 points and a career-high 12 rebounds in a 105–98 win over the Dallas Mavericks. On February 6, he scored a career-high 26 points in a loss to the Cleveland Cavaliers. In the 45 games he played with the Pelicans during the 2015–16 season, Cole started 23 games, finishing with averages of 10.6 points, 3.4 rebounds, 3.7 assists, .8 steals, playing 26.6 minutes per game. Cole missed his first and only NBA playoff appearance with the Pelicans in the 2015–16 season.

=== Shandong Golden Stars (2016) ===
On October 5, 2016, Cole signed with Shandong Golden Stars of the Chinese Basketball Association. On November 30, 2016, he was released by Shandong. In 9 games played for Shandong, Cole averaged 19.1 points, 2.5 rebounds, 4.3 assists, 1.6 steals per game.

=== Oklahoma City Thunder (2017) ===
On March 1, 2017, Cole signed with the Oklahoma City Thunder. In 13 games played for the Thunder, Cole averaged 3.3 points and 1.1 assists in 9.6 minutes per game.

=== Maccabi Tel Aviv (2017–2018) ===
On August 15, 2017, Cole signed a one-year deal with the Israeli team Maccabi Tel Aviv of the EuroLeague. On November 30, 2017, Cole recorded a season-high 26 points, shooting 4-of-6 from three-point range, along with 5 rebounds and 4 assists in an 81–74 win over Žalgiris.

Cole helped Maccabi win the 2018 Israeli League Championship, winning his third career title. In 28 EuroLeague games played during the 2017–18 season, Cole averaged 12.6 points, 2.5 rebounds, 3.8 assists and 1.1 steals per game.

=== Sidigas Avellino (2018) ===
On August 17, 2018, Cole signed with Italian basketball team Sidigas Avellino for the 2018–19 LBA season. On October 7, 2018, Cole made his debut with Avellino in 98–81 win over Red October Cantù, recording 21 points, three rebounds and a career-high 13 assists. Two days later, Cole recorded a career-high 34 points, along with 5 rebounds and 7 assists in a 100–93 win over Nizhny Novgorod. He was subsequently named Champions League Gameday 1 MVP. On October 23, 2018, Cole recorded 33 points, shooting 7-of-13 from three-point range, along with 8 rebounds and 9 assists in a 105–102 overtime win over Anwil Włocławek. He was subsequently named Champions League Gameday 3 MVP. In 19 games played for Avellino, Cole averaged 16.3 points, 3.4 rebounds and a career-high 6.2 assists.

On December 21, 2018, Cole parted ways with Avellino due to financial difficulties.

=== Budućnost (2018–2019) ===
On December 21, 2018, Cole joined the Montenegrin team Budućnost Podgorica of the ABA League and the EuroLeague, signing for the rest of the season. On December 28, 2018, Cole made his debut in an 88–93 loss to Bayern Munich, recording 27 points and six assists off the bench. In 15 Euroleague games played and 12 games started, he averaged 16.6 points, 2.7 rebounds, and 4.6 assists in 26.6 minutes per game.

=== Monaco (2019–2020) ===
On October 6, 2019, Cole joined Maccabi Haifa for their 2019 NBA pre-season tour.

On November 11, 2019, Cole signed a one-year deal with Monaco of the French LNB Pro A. On November 20, 2019, he made his debut in a 77–75 win over Maccabi Rishon LeZion, recording 18 points and three assists off the bench.

=== ASVEL (2020–2021) ===
During the 2020–21 season, Cole played for ASVEL Basket, averaging 13.7 points and 3.6 assists per game. He parted ways with the team on July 11, 2021.

=== Unicaja Malaga (2021–2022) ===
On August 19, 2021, Cole signed with Unicaja of the Liga ACB. On March 21, 2022, the club reached a mutual parting agreement with Cole. He had not played since January 25, and averaged 13.4 points and 4.2 assists in 16 games in the Liga ACB.

=== JL Bourg (2022) ===
On March 21, 2022, he has signed with JL Bourg of the LNB Pro A. In eight games with Bourg, he averaged 13.3 points per game.

=== Grand Rapids Gold (2022–2023) ===
On November 4, 2022, Cole was named to the opening-night roster for the Grand Rapids Gold. On January 27, 2023, the Gold waived Cole.

=== Al Ahly (2023) ===
In August 2023, Cole signed with the Egyptian champions Al Ahly. He played in the 2023 FIBA Intercontinental Cup with the Reds, and made his debut on 21 September when he contributed 13 points and 9 assists in Al Ahly's win over the NBA G League Ignite. The Al Ahly win was the first ever by an African club in the competition's history.

=== NBA G League Ignite (2023–2024) ===
In September 2023, following his performance with Al Ahly, Cole joined Ohud Medina of the Saudi Basketball League, but didn't play for them. On November 30, he signed with the NBA G League Ignite.

=== Osos de Manatí (2024–2025) ===
On April 23, 2024, Cole signed with the Osos de Manatí of the Baloncesto Superior Nacional.

== Coaching career ==
On October 20, 2025, Cole was named head girls' basketball coach at Trinity High School in Shiremanstown, Pennsylvania. He was not retained at the conclusion of the 2025–26 season.

He joined the Miami Heat's NBA G League affiliate team, the Sioux Falls Skyforce's coaching staff as an assistant coach, in September 2026.

== Career statistics ==
=== NBA ===
Legend
GP	Games played	GS	Games started	MPG	Minutes per game
FG%	Field goal percentage	3P%	3-point field goal percentage	FT%	Free throw percentage
RPG	Rebounds per game	APG	Assists per game	SPG	Steals per game
BPG	Blocks per game	PPG	Points per game	**Bold**	Career high
†	Won an NBA championship

==== Regular season ====
Year	Team	GP	GS	MPG	FG%	3P%	FT%	RPG	APG	SPG	BPG	PPG
2011–12†	Miami	65	2	19.4	.393	.276	.776	1.4	2.0	.7	.0	6.8
2012–13†	Miami	80	4	19.9	.421	.357	.650	1.6	2.1	.7	.1	5.6
2013–14	Miami	**82**	6	24.6	.414	.345	.779	2.0	3.0	**.9**	.1	6.4
2014–15	Miami	47	**23**	24.4	.386	.265	.696	2.3	3.5	**.9**	.2	6.3
2014–15	New Orleans	28	2	24.4	**.444**	**.378**	.743	1.8	3.2	.5	**.3**	9.9
2015–16	New Orleans	45	**23**	**26.6**	.405	.324	**.800**	**3.4**	**3.7**	.8	.1	**10.6**
2016–17	Oklahoma City	13	0	9.6	.308	.231	**.800**	.8	1.1	.6	.0	3.3
Career		360	60	22.3	.407	.324	.743	2.0	2.7	.8	.1	7.0

==== Playoffs ====
Year	Team	GP	GS	MPG	FG%	3P%	FT%	RPG	APG	SPG	BPG	PPG
2012†	Miami	19	0	8.9	.324	.250	.778	.5	.6	.4	.0	1.8
2013†	Miami	**21**	0	19.9	**.480**	**.531**	.737	**1.9**	**2.0**	**.7**	.1	6.1
2014	Miami	20	0	20.2	.410	.375	**.867**	1.1	1.8	.5	.1	4.6
2015	New Orleans	4	0	**26.5**	.417	.214	.667	1.8	1.8	.0	**.3**	**8.8**
2017	Oklahoma City	4	0	6.1	.250	.250	.0	.3	.3	.0	.3	1.2
Career		68	0	16.5	.421	.382	.783	1.2	1.4	.4	.0	4.3

=== EuroLeague ===
Year	Team	GP	GS	MPG	FG%	3P%	FT%	RPG	APG	SPG	BPG	PPG	PIR
2017–18	Maccabi	**28**	3	24.5	.417	.319	.817	2.5	3.8	**1.1**	**.1**	12.6	11.1
2018–19	Budućnost	15	**12**	**26.6**	**.493**	**.380**	**.857**	**2.7**	**4.6**	.8	.0	**16.6**	**15.2**
Career		43	15	25.2	.447	.345	.829	2.5	4.1	1.0	.0	14.0	12.5

=== Domestic Leagues ===
Year	Team	League	GP	MPG	FG%	3P%	FT%	RPG	APG	SPG	BPG	PPG
2016–17	(China) Shandong Golden Stars	CBA	9	27.5	.412	.286	.769	2.5	4.3	1.6	.0	19.1
2017–18	(Israel) Maccabi Tel Aviv	IPL	32	22.9	.418	.231	.791	2.1	3.5	1.1	.1	11.8
2018–19	(Italy) Sidigas Avellino	LBA	10	30.1	.434	.327	.719	3.2	6.1	1.2	.0	16.3
2018–19	(Montenegro) Budućnost Podgorica	ABA	17	25.0	.460	.291	.750	3.5	4.3	1.0	.0	13.2

=== College ===
Year	Team	GP	GS	MPG	FG%	3P%	FT%	RPG	APG	SPG	BPG	PPG
2007–08	Cleveland State	34	0	14.4	.380	.238	.817	1.4	0.8	0.6	0.0	4.9
2008–09	Cleveland State	35	33	32.8	**.453**	.305	.804	2.5	2.4	1.2	**0.1**	13.3
2009–10	Cleveland State	33	33	34.2	.432	**.342**	.799	2.8	4.4	1.8	**0.1**	16.3
2010–11	Cleveland State	**36**	**36**	**35.7**	.439	**.342**	**.853**	**5.8**	**5.3**	**2.2**	**0.1**	**21.7**
Career		138	102	29.4	.435	.321	.826	3.2	3.3	1.5	0.1	14.1

== Personal life ==
Cole was a member of the National Honor Society and served as the salutatorian of his high school senior class. He earned a bachelor's degree in health sciences from Cleveland State.

He is the cousin of retired defensive end Trent Cole.
