= Tyler Davis (basketball) =

Puerto Rican basketball player (born 1997)

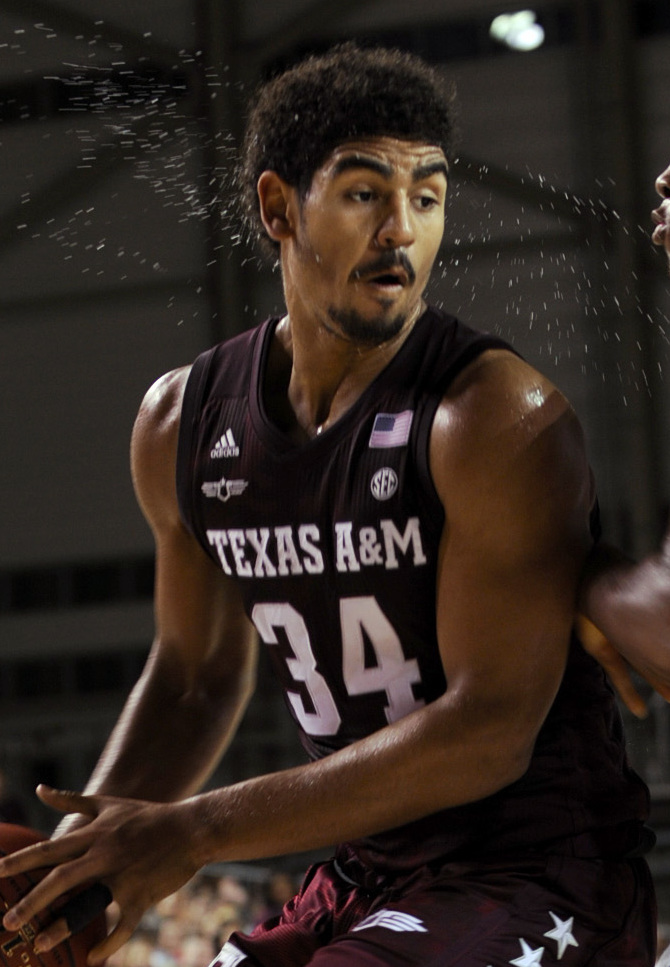
- Davis in 2017

Free agent
- Position: Center

Personal information
- Born: May 22, 1997 (age 29) San Jose, California, U.S.
- Listed height: 6 ft 11 in (2.11 m)
- Listed weight: 270 lb (122 kg)

Career information
- High school: Plano West (Plano, Texas)
- College: Texas A&M (2015–2018)
- NBA draft: 2018: undrafted
- Playing career: 2018–present

Career history
- 2018: Oklahoma City Thunder
- 2018: →Oklahoma City Blue
- 2020: Oklahoma City Blue
- 2020–2021: Jeonju KCC Egis
- 2021–2022: Mexico City Capitanes
- 2022: Texas Legends
- 2024–2026: Osos de Manatí

Career highlights
- First-team All-SEC – Coaches (2018); Second-team All-SEC (2017); SEC All-Freshman Team (2016); Texas Mr. Basketball (2015)
- Stats at NBA.com
- Stats at Basketball Reference

Tyler Lee-Deon Davis (born May 22, 1997) is an American-Puerto Rican professional basketball player who last played for the Osos de Manatí of the Baloncesto Superior Nacional (BSN). He played college basketball for the Texas A&M Aggies. He also represents the senior Puerto Rican national basketball team in international national team competitions. Standing at a height of 6 ft 11 in (2.11 m), he plays at the center position.

== College career ==
As a freshman, Davis averaged 11.3 points and 6.2 rebounds per game, joining Admon Gilder and D. J. Hogg on a team that reached the Sweet 16. As a sophomore, Davis was a second-team All-SEC player. Between his sophomore and junior season Davis slimmed down to better compete in SEC play. He led the team in scoring as a junior with 14.9 points per game while finishing second in rebounding behind Robert Williams with 8.9 rebounds per game. Following the season, he declared for the NBA draft.

== Professional career ==
=== Oklahoma City Thunder (2018) ===
After going undrafted in the 2018 NBA draft, Davis joined the Brooklyn Nets for NBA Summer League play. On August 13, 2018, the Oklahoma City Thunder signed Davis to a two-way contract. Davis made his NBA debut on November 28, 2018, against the Cleveland Cavaliers, playing one minute and grabbing a rebound. On December 28, 2018, Davis was waived by the Oklahoma City Thunder. He averaged 17.2 points and 11.5 rebounds per game for the Oklahoma City Blue.

=== Oklahoma City Blue (2019–2020) ===
Davis was re-acquired by the Blue in a trade with the Agua Caliente Clippers on November 29, 2019.

=== Jeonju KCC Egis (2020–2021) ===
On July 15, 2020, he signed with Jeonju KCC Egis of the Korean Basketball League.

=== Mexico City Capitanes (2021–2022) ===
On October 22, 2021, Davis signed with the Mexico City Capitanes of the NBA G League. Davis was then later waived by the Capitanes after appearing in 10 games and averaged 11.9 points, 8.5 rebounds, 2.0 assists, and 1.6 blocks per game.

=== Texas Legends (2022) ===
On January 11, 2022, Davis cleared waivers and was acquired by the Texas Legends. However, he was waived on February 9 after a season-ending injury.

=== Osos de Manatí (2024–2026) ===
In February 2024, Davis joined the Osos de Manatí of the Baloncesto Superior Nacional (BSN).

In July 2024, Davis signed with the Busan KCC Egis of the Korean Basketball League. On October 15, he was replaced by Leon Williams.

== National team career ==
Davis represented the Puerto Rican national team at the 2017 FIBA AmeriCup. Davis averaged 12.3 points, 6.7 rebounds and 1.7 assists per game in the tournament.

== Career statistics ==
Legend
| GP | Games played | GS | Games started | MPG | Minutes per game |
| FG% | Field goal percentage | 3P% | 3-point field goal percentage | FT% | Free throw percentage |
| RPG | Rebounds per game | APG | Assists per game | SPG | Steals per game |
| BPG | Blocks per game | PPG | Points per game | **Bold** | Career high |

=== NBA ===
==== Regular season ====
| Year | Team | GP | GS | MPG | FG% | 3P% | FT% | RPG | APG | SPG | BPG | PPG |
|---|---|---|---|---|---|---|---|---|---|---|---|---|
| 2018–19 | Oklahoma City | 1 | 0 | .9 | .000 | – | – | 1.0 | .0 | .0 | .0 | .0 |

=== NBA G League ===
| Year | Team | GP | GS | MPG | FG% | 3P% | FT% | RPG | APG | SPG | BPG | PPG |
|---|---|---|---|---|---|---|---|---|---|---|---|---|
| 2018–19 | Oklahoma City | 15 | 8 | 26.7 | .573 | – | .765 | 11.7 | 1.7 | .6 | 1.8 | 17.2 |

=== College ===
| Year | Team | GP | GS | MPG | FG% | 3P% | FT% | RPG | APG | SPG | BPG | PPG |
|---|---|---|---|---|---|---|---|---|---|---|---|---|
| 2015–16 | Texas A&M | **36** | 34 | 22.8 | **.655** | – | .625 | 6.2 | .7 | **.6** | 1.1 | 11.3 |
| 2016–17 | Texas A&M | 31 | 31 | 26.2 | .617 | .000 | **.693** | 7.0 | **1.4** | .5 | .9 | 14.1 |
| 2017–18 | Texas A&M | 35 | **35** | **29.1** | .585 | **.280** | .623 | **8.9** | 1.3 | .3 | **1.3** | **14.9** |
| Career | | 102 | 100 | 26.0 | .614 | .269 | .646 | 7.4 | 1.1 | .5 | 1.1 | 13.4 |

== Personal life ==
Davis' mother is from Puerto Rico. He visited Puerto Rico for the first time in 2017.
