= Jhivvan Jackson =

Puerto Rican basketball player (born 1998)

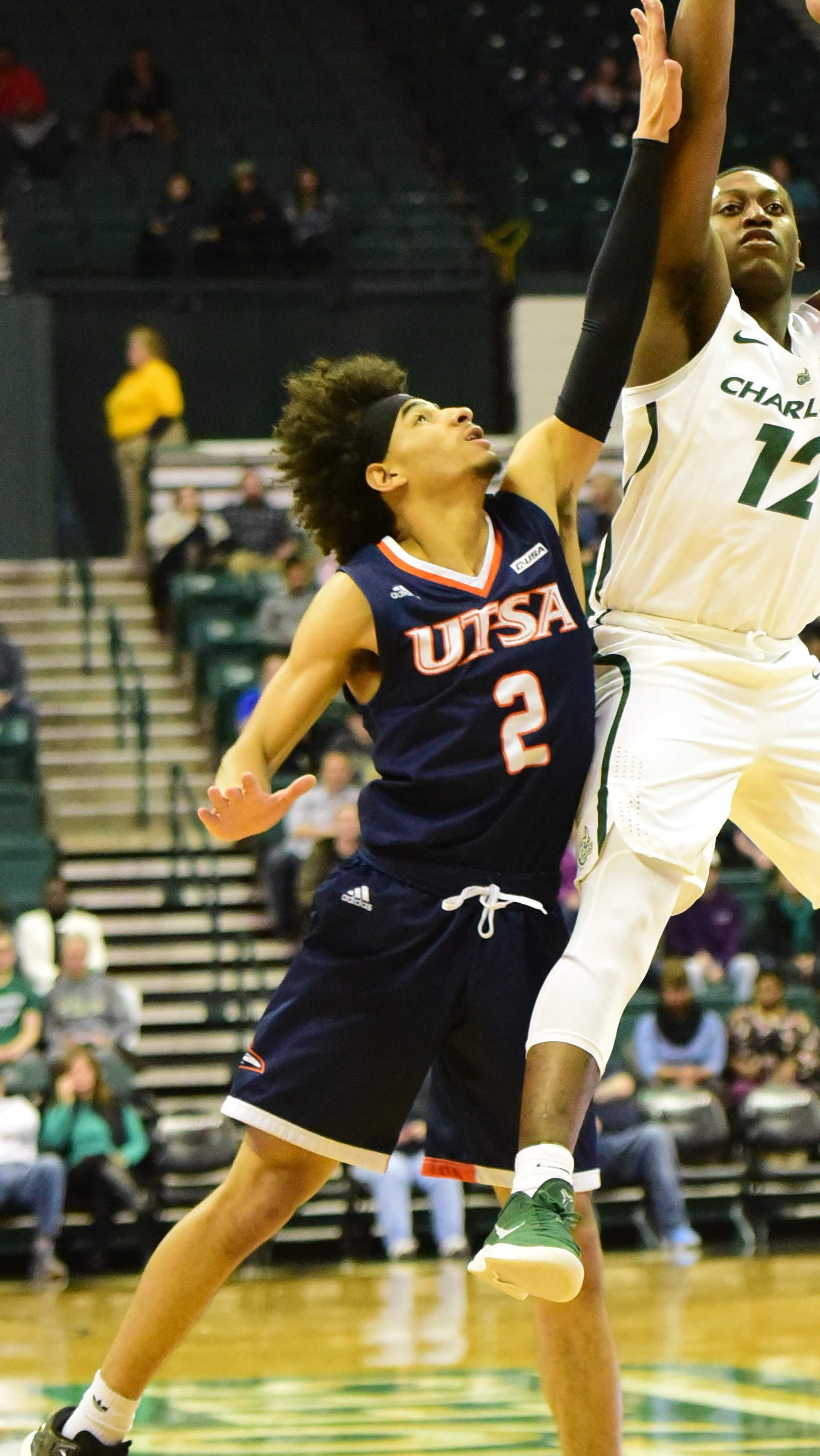

Free agent
- Position: Point guard / shooting guard

Personal information
- Born: August 27, 1998 (age 28) Bayamón, Puerto Rico
- Listed height: 6 ft 0 in (1.83 m)
- Listed weight: 170 lb (77 kg)

Career information
- High school: Trinity (Euless, Texas)
- College: UTSA (2017–2021)
- NBA draft: 2021: undrafted
- Playing career: 2022–present

Career history
- 2022: CB Menorca
- 2022–2023: Spirou Charleroi
- 2023–2024: Tigers Tübingen
- 2024: Osos de Manatí
- 2024–2025: Würzburg
- 2025–2026: San Pablo Burgos

Career highlights
- Bundesliga MVP (2025); All-Bundesliga First Team (2025); Bundesliga Best Offensive Player (2025); BSN Rookie of the Year (2024); 3× First-team All-Conference USA (2019–2021); Second-team All-Conference USA (2018); Conference USA Freshman of the Year (2018)

Jhivvan Jameel Jackson Meléndez (born August 27, 1998) is a Puerto Rican-Panamanian professional basketball player who last played for San Pablo Burgos of the Spanish Liga ACB. He played college basketball for the UTSA Roadrunners.

== Early life and high school ==
Jackson began playing basketball at the age of five. He moved from his hometown of Bayamón, Puerto Rico to Dallas, Texas in seventh grade. He played four years of varsity basketball at Trinity High School in Euless, Texas. As a freshman, Jackson was teammates with top recruit and future National Basketball Association (NBA) player Myles Turner. In his senior season, he averaged 22 points, five rebounds, five assists and 2.8 steals per game. and also his older brother Jalen Jackson He scored 52 points in a 92–91 overtime win over Denton Guyer High School in the playoffs after missing the two games previous with an injured ankle. Jackson was lightly recruited, his only NCAA Division I offers coming from New Mexico and UTSA, and was not rated by any major recruiting services. On October 16, 2016, he committed to play for UTSA, who discovered him at an all-star game in New York City.

== College career ==
As a freshman, Jackson was named Conference USA freshman of the year and Second Team All-Conference USA. He averaged 18.4 points per game to lead the team. Jackson tore his ACL at the end of his freshman season, cutting the year six games short. He missed the first three games of his sophomore season while recovering from the injury. He scored a career-high 46 points and hit a career-high eight three-pointers in a 96–88 overtime loss to Western Kentucky on January 31, 2019. As a sophomore, Jackson led Conference USA in scoring with 22.9 points per game on 38.6 percent shooting from the field, combining with Keaton Wallace to form the highest scoring backcourt in Division I. Jackson was named to the First Team All-Conference USA.

On December 21, Jackson scored 41 points in a 89–70 win over Illinois State. He was subsequently named National Player of the Week by the United States Basketball Writers Association (USBWA), becoming the first Conference USA player to win the award since its creation in 2009–10. On February 6, 2020, Jackson scored a season-high 45 points in an 85–81 overtime victory over Old Dominion. Jackson scored 14 points in a 84–59 loss to Old Dominion on March 4 and surpassed the 2,000 point mark. At the conclusion of the regular season, Jackson was named to the First Team All-Conference USA. As a junior, Jackson averaged 26.8 points, 5.6 rebounds, and 2.4 assists per game. He averaged 19.9 points, 4.2 rebounds, and 3.4 assists per game as a senior.

== Professional career ==
On March 6, 2022, Jackson signed his first professional contract with CB Menorca of the LEB Plata. On August 29, 2022, he signed with Spirou of the BNXT League.

Jackson joined Tigers Tübingen in Germany for the 2023–24 season.

On September 3, 2024, he signed with Würzburg Baskets of the Basketball Bundesliga (BBL).

On July 21, 2025, he signed with San Pablo Burgos of the Spanish Liga ACB.

== National team career ==
Jackson was named to the Puerto Rico U18 team in the 2016 FIBA Americas Under-18 Championship. He averaged 12.4 points and 3.6 rebounds per game in five games.

== Career statistics ==
Legend
GP	Games played	GS	Games started	MPG	Minutes per game
FG%	Field goal percentage	3P%	3-point field goal percentage	FT%	Free throw percentage
RPG	Rebounds per game	APG	Assists per game	SPG	Steals per game
BPG	Blocks per game	PPG	Points per game	**Bold**	Career high

=== College ===
Year	Team	GP	GS	MPG	FG%	3P%	FT%	RPG	APG	SPG	BPG	PPG
2017–18	UTSA	29	9	25.7	.431	.368	.768	3.2	1.8	1.0	.1	18.4
2018–19	UTSA	29	24	30.8	.386	.351	.846	4.1	2.4	1.2	.1	22.9
2019–20	UTSA	**32**	**31**	**34.5**	.418	.354	**.852**	**5.6**	2.4	**1.4**	.2	**26.8**
2020–21	UTSA	25	24	33.2	**.468**	**.369**	.784	4.2	**3.4**	1.0	**.3**	19.9
Career		115	88	31.1	.421	.359	.818	4.3	2.5	1.2	.2	22.2

== Personal life ==
Jackson's father, LeRoy Jackson, played college basketball in the early 1990s for Oregon State before playing for Panama and professionally in Puerto Rico and the Dominican Republic. His grandfather, Flor Meléndez, played for Puerto Rico at the 1968 Olympics and professionally in Puerto Rico. Meléndez coached the national teams of Puerto Rico, Argentina and Panama as well as professional teams in Venezuela and Spain.

Jackson's name, Jhivvan, is derived from the Hindi word, "Jeevan," meaning life.
