= Osos de Manatí =

Basketball team based in Manatí, Puerto Rico

- Nickname: "Bears"
- Leagues: BSN
- Founded: 2015
- Folded: 2026
- History: Atenienses de Manatí; 2015–2017; Osos de Manatí; 2023–2026
- Arena: Juan Cruz Abreu Coliseum
- Capacity: 8,000
- Location: Manatí, Puerto Rico
- Team colors: Blue, Yellow, Red
- Championships: 0
- Website: https://www.bsnpr.com/team/osos/
Home	Away

The Osos de Manatí were a professional basketball team based in Manatí, Puerto Rico. They played in the Baloncesto Superior Nacional (BSN), the top division basketball league in Puerto Rico. Prior to 2017, the team was named Atenienses de Manatí. In October 2022 they returned from a hiatus, when Puerto Rican singer Ozuna purchased the Brujos de Guayama, and relocated the team to Manatí. The team reached its first ever BSN finals in 2024, but lost in seven games to the Criollos de Caguas. On October 30, 2026, the league announced the team would be transferred to Fajardo, becoming the Cariduros de Fajardo.

== Home arenas ==
- Juan Cruz Abreu Coliseum (2014–2026)

== Notable players ==
- (British Virgin Islands) Kleon Penn
- (Dominican Republic) Adris De León
- (Mali) Cheick Diallo
- (Nigeria) Miye Oni
- (Panama) Gary Forbes
- (Puerto Rico) Alex Abreu
- (Puerto Rico) Omar Alvarado
- (Puerto Rico) Alejandro Carmona
- (Puerto Rico) Alexis Colón
- (Puerto Rico) Tyler Davis
- (Puerto Rico) Jonathan García
- (Puerto Rico) Jordan Howard
- (Puerto Rico) Jhivvan Jackson
- (Puerto Rico) Ricardo Meléndez
- (Puerto Rico) Alex Morales
- (Puerto Rico) Christopher Ortiz
- (Puerto Rico) Wilfredo Pagán
- (Puerto Rico) Nathan Peavy
- (Puerto Rico) Ángelo Reyes
- (Puerto Rico) Andrés Rodríguez
- (Puerto Rico) Jonathan Rodríguez
- (Puerto Rico) Ricky Sánchez
- (Puerto Rico) Isaac Sosa
- (Puerto Rico) Joseph Soto
- (Puerto Rico) Ethan Thompson
- (Puerto Rico) Edwin Ubiles
- (United States) Ryan Arcidiacono
- (United States) Brandon Bowman
- (United States) Deonte Burton
- (United States) Norris Cole
- (United States) Tyler Cook
- (United States) Vonteego Cummings
- (United States) Kendric Davis
- (United States) Dewan Hernandez
- (United States) Jerome James
- (United States) Dominique Jones
- (United States) Perry Jones III
- (United States) Sheldon Mac
- (United States) Greg Monroe
- (United States) Arnett Moultrie
- (United States) Jameer Nelson Jr.
- (United States) Elfrid Payton
- (United States) Raymond Spalding
- (United States) Maalik Wayns
- (United States) Jamil Wilson
