= Baloncesto Superior Nacional Scoring Champion =

Baloncesto Superior Nacional Scoring Champion are the season by season points leaders of the top-tier level professional basketball league in Puerto Rico, the BSN. It was inaugurated during the 1956–57 season.

== Characteristics ==
In basketball, points are accumulated through free throws or field goals.

Since the 1969–70 season, the BSN's scoring champion is awarded to the player with the highest points per game average in a given regular season. Prior to the 1969–70 season, the league's leader in points was the player that scored the most total points in the league during the season.

To qualify for a scoring champion, a player must play in at least 75 percent of the total games played during that season.

== Points Leader by season ==
=== By Total Points scored ===
Total Points Leaders (1956–57 to 1969–70)
Season	Player (League's Leader in Points)	Club	Total Points	Ref
1956–57	(Puerto Rico) Juan Báez	Cardenales de Rio Piedras	394	
1957–58	(Puerto Rico) Roberto Herrera	Gallitos de Isabela	365	
1958–59	(Puerto Rico) Evelio Droz	Vaqueros de Bayamón	407	
1959–60	(Puerto Rico) Teófilo Cruz	Cangrejeros de Santurce	469	
1960–61	(Puerto Rico) Juan Báez (2×)	Cardenales de Rio Piedras	492	
1961–62	(Puerto Rico) Teófilo Cruz (2×)	Cangrejeros de Santurce	312	
1962–63	(Puerto Rico) Martin Ansa	Vaqueros de Bayamón	405	
1963–64	(Puerto Rico) Juan Báez (3×)	Cardenales de Rio Piedras	523	
1964–65	(Puerto Rico) Richie Pietri	Leones de Ponce	419	
1965–66	(Puerto Rico) Jaime Frontera	Capitanes de Arecibo	400	
1966–67	(Puerto Rico) Adolfo Porrata	Capitalinos de San Juan	516	
1967–68	(Puerto Rico) Raymond Dalmau	Piratas de Quebradillas	499	
1968–69	(Puerto Rico) Neftalí Rivera	Piratas de Quebradillas	602	
1969–70	(Puerto Rico) Raymond Dalmau (2×)	Piratas de Quebradillas	546	

=== Multiple-time leaders ===
Ranking	Player	Team	Times leader	Years
1	(Puerto Rico) Juan Báez	Cardenales de Río Piedras	3	1956–57, 1960–61, 1963–64
2	(Puerto Rico) Teófilo Cruz	Cangrejeros de Santurce	2	1959–60, 1961–62
2	(Puerto Rico) Raymond Dalmau	Piratas de Quebradillas	2	1967–68, 1969–70

=== By Points average ===
Points Leader Average (1970–71 to Present)
Season	Player (League's Leader in Points)	Club	Points Average	Ref
1970–71	(Puerto Rico) Teófilo Cruz (3×)	Cangrejeros de Santurce	22.4	
1971–72	(Puerto Rico) Samuel Betancourt	Santos de San Juan	26.9	
1972–73	(Puerto Rico) Neftalí Rivera (2×)	Piratas de Quebradillas	25.2	
1973–74	(Puerto Rico) Héctor Blondet	Capitanes de Arecibo	25.1	
1974–75	(Puerto Rico) Samuel Betancourt (2×)	Santos de San Juan	22.9	
1975–76	(Puerto Rico) Samuel Betancourt (3×)	Santos de San Juan	21.9	
1976–77	(Puerto Rico) Gerogie Torres Dougherty	Cariduros de Fajardo	30.1	
1977–78	(Puerto Rico) Gerogie Torres Dougherty (2×)	Cariduros de Fajardo	29.1	
1978–79	(Puerto Rico) Gerogie Torres Dougherty (3×)	Cariduros de Fajardo	32.9	
1979–80	(Puerto Rico) Mario Morales	Cangrejeros de Santurce	32.9	
1980–81	(Panama) Rolando Frazer Thorne	Polluelos de Aibonito	33.4	
1981–82	(Panama) Rolando Frazer Thorne (2×)	Polluelos de Aibonito	34.2	
1982–83	(Panama) Jim Maldonado	Capitanes de Arecibo	30.6	
1983–84	(Puerto Rico) Gerogie Torres Dougherty (4×)	Cariduros de Fajardo	28.8	
1984–85	(Puerto Rico) Gerogie Torres Dougherty (5×)	Cariduros de Fajardo	33.5	
1985–86	(Puerto Rico) Gerogie Torres Dougherty (6×)	Cariduros de Fajardo	29.8	
1986–87	(Puerto Rico) Gerogie Torres Dougherty (7×)	Cariduros de Fajardo	35.5	
1987–88	(Puerto Rico) Edgar de León	Cariduros de Fajardo	29.5	
1988–89	(United States) (Puerto Rico) Wesley Correa	Titanes de Morovis	30.9	
1989–90	(Puerto Rico) Edgar de León (2×)	Cariduros de Fajardo	31.8	
1990–91	(Puerto Rico) Edwin Pellot	Gallitos de Isabela	31.5	
1991–92	(United States) (Puerto Rico) Wesley Correa (2×)	Titanes de Morovis	26.2	
1992–93	(Puerto Rico) Mario Morales (2×)	Mets de Guaynabo	25.0	
1993–94	(Puerto Rico) Jorge Medrano	Indios de Mayagüez	30.3	
1994–95	(Puerto Rico) Joél Curbelo	Gigantes de Carolina	25.5	
1995–96	(Puerto Rico) Eddie Casiano	Atléticos de San Germán	25.7	
1996–97	(Puerto Rico) Eddie Casiano (2×)	Atléticos de San Germán	26.6	
1997–98	(Puerto Rico) Orlando Vega	Piratas de Quebradillas	25.0	
1998–99	(Puerto Rico) Orlando Vega (2×)	Piratas de Quebradillas	25.8	
1999–00	(United States) (Israel) William Sims	Titanes de Morovis	22.6	
2000–01	(United States) Norman Nolan	Gigantes de Carolina	27.3	
2001–02	(Puerto Rico) Elías Larry Ayuso	Atléticos de San Germán	24.2	
2002–03	(Puerto Rico) Carlos Escalera	Maratonistas de Coamo	25.4	
2003–04	(Puerto Rico) Christian Dalmau	Atléticos de San Germán	24.0	
2004–05	(Puerto Rico) Christian Dalmau (2×)	Atléticos de San Germán	26.9	
2005–06	(United States) Robert Brannen	Atléticos de San Germán	21.3	
2006–07	(Puerto Rico) Ángel Figueroa	Grises de Humacao	24.7	
2007–08	(Puerto Rico) Ricardo Melendez	Criollos de Caguas	22.2	
2008–09	(United States) Jesse Pellot	Atléticos de San Germán	23.5	
2009–10	(Puerto Rico) Christian Dalmau (3×)	Vaqueros de Bayamón	21.6	
2010–11	(Puerto Rico) Peter John Ramos	Piratas de Quebradillas	23.3	
2011–12	(United States) Al Thornton	Brujos de Guayama	25.3	
2012–13	(United States) Mike Harris	Leones de Ponce	20.5	
2013–14	(United States) Al Thornton (2×)	Brujos de Guayama	22.6	
2014–15	(Puerto Rico) Peter John Ramos (2×)	Brujos de Guayama	23.2	
2015–16	(United States) Damion James	Cangrejeros de Santurce	18.2	
2016–17	(United States) Damien Wilkins	Brujos de Guayama	20.3	
2017–18	(United States) Reyshawn Terry	Piratas de Quebradillas	23.2	
2018–19	(Dominican Republic) (Puerto Rico) Víctor Liz	Leones de Ponce	23.2	
2019–20	(United States) Paris Bass	Atléticos de San Germán	22.2	
2020–21	(United States) Paris Bass (2×)	Atléticos de San Germán	22.7	
2021–22	(United States) Sheldon Mac	Gigantes de Carolina	24.5	
2022–23	(United States) Brandon Knight	Piratas de Quebradillas	24.4	
2023–24	(Democratic Republic of the Congo) Emmanuel Mudiay	Piratas de Quebradillas	21.5	
2024–25	(Democratic Republic of the Congo) Emmanuel Mudiay (2×)	Piratas de Quebradillas	23.6	
2025–26	(United States) Jaylen Nowell	Gigantes de Carolina	22.4	

=== Multiple-time leaders ===
Ranking	Player	Team	Times leader	Years
1	(Puerto Rico) Gerogie Torres Dougherty	Cariduros de Fajardo	7	1977, 1978, 1979, 1984, 1985, 1986, 1987
2	(Puerto Rico) Teófilo Cruz	Cangrejeros de Santurce	4	1960, 1961, 1962, 1971
3	(Puerto Rico) Christian Dalmau	Cangrejeros de Santurce; Vaqueros de Bayamón	3	2004, 2005, 2010
T-4	(Democratic Republic of the Congo) Emmanuel Mudiay	Piratas de Quebradillas	2	2024, 2025
T-4	(Puerto Rico) Peter John Ramos	Brujos de Guayama; Piratas de Quebradillas	2	2011, 2015
