= 2027 Baloncesto Superior Nacional season =

Baloncesto Superior Nacional
- Season: 2027
- Duration: March 20 – September
- Teams: 12
- TV partner: Telemundo Puerto Rico

The 2027 Baloncesto Superior Nacional season is to be the 98th season of the Baloncesto Superior Nacional (BSN). The Vaqueros de Bayamón will come into the season as the defending champions, winning both the 2025 and 2026 BSN Finals. The regular season is set to begin on March 20th, 2027.

== 2027 BSN season ==
=== Team Changes ===
- Indios de Mayagüez owner Dion New sent a relocation request on September 18th. Dion New is hoping to relocate the team to and become the Gallitos de Isabela. On September 25th, the Board of Governors voted not in favor of relocating the team to Isabella.Team will continue to play in Mayagüez for the 2027 season.
- Osos de Manatí sent a relocation request on October 22nd, hoping to move the team and become Cariduros de Fajardo. The request was approved on October 30th and the team will play in Fajardo in 2027.

==== Arena Changes ====
- Mario Morales Coliseum, the home of the Mets de Guaynabo is still currently undergoing renovations, and the team will continue to be playing their homes at Coliseo Fernando "Rube" Hernández in Gurabo for the 2027 season. On October 22nd, the Mets sent a request to the league asking permission to use José Miguel Agrelot Coliseum in San Juan, a 19,500 seat arena.

==== Player's Rights ====
- Quebradillas will continue to own the player's rights to Tai Odiase, with his Reinforcement tag being changed to Native. He became naturalized in 2024.

== Teams ==
=== Venues and locations ===
Baloncesto Superior Nacional
Location of full BSN members: Metro Div. (A) members, Isla Div. (B) members

Team	Location	Arena	Capacity	Conference
Atléticos de San Germán	San Germán	Arquelio Torres Ramírez Coliseum	5,000	B
Cangrejeros de Santurce	Santurce	Roberto Clemente Coliseum	9,000	A
Capitanes de Arecibo	Arecibo	Manuel Iguina Coliseum	12,000	B
Cariduros de Fajardo	Fajardo	Tomás Dones Coliseum	8,000	A
Criollos de Caguas	Caguas	Coliseo Roger Mendoza	3,000	A
Gigantes de Carolina	Carolina	Guillermo Angulo Coliseum	5,000	A
Indios de Mayagüez	Mayagüez	Palacio de Recreación y Deportes	5,500	B
Leones de Ponce	Ponce	Juan Pachín Vicéns Auditorium	11,000	B
Mets de Guaynabo	Guaynabo	Mario Morales Coliseum	5,500	A
Piratas de Quebradillas	Quebradillas	Raymond Dalmau Coliseum	5,500	B
Santeros de Aguada	Aguada	Ismael Delgado Coliseum	6,000	B
Vaqueros de Bayamón	Bayamón	Ruben Rodriguez Coliseum	12,000	A

=== Personnel and sponsorship ===
Team	Head coach	Kit manufacturer	Jersey sponsor(s)
Atléticos de San Germán	(Puerto Rico) Eddie Casiano; 6th season		Allied Car & Truck Rental, El Mesón Sándwiches
Cangrejeros de Santurce	(Puerto Rico) Carlos Gonzales 1st season	Adidas	None.
Capitanes de Arecibo	(Puerto Rico) Larry Ayuso 1st season	AC Sports	PenFed Credit Union
Cariduros de Fajardo	(Puerto Rico) Iván Ríos	Wilson's Stuff (PR)	
Criollos de Caguas	(Puerto Rico) Wilhelmus Caanen	Optime Sports	Calesa Toyota
Gigantes de Carolina	(Puerto Rico) Juan Cardona; 1st season		Marco's Pizza
Indios de Mayagüez	(Puerto Rico) Ivan "Pipo" Velez		Rincón Rental, Windmar Home
Leones de Ponce	(Puerto Rico) Carlos Rivera	AC Sports	Claro, EcoMaxx
Mets de Guaynabo	(Puerto Rico) Jorge Rincon	Monarch	Brava Lubricants, Me Salvé
Piratas de Quebradillas	(United States) Brad Greenberg; 1st season	AC Sports	Sixt
Santeros de Aguada	(Puerto Rico) Rafael "Pachy" Cruz		Coop Rincón, SpeedyNet
Vaqueros de Bayamón	(Puerto Rico) Christian Dalmau; 3rd season	Optime Sports	Goya Foods

== Transactions ==
=== Managerial/coaching changes ===
Club	Outgoing manager/coach	Manner of departure	Date of vacancy	Replaced by	Date of appointment	Position in table	Ref.
Off-Season changes
Capitanes de Arecibo	(Puerto Rico) Juan Cardona	Mutual agreement	28 August 2026	(Puerto Rico) Larry Ayuso	1 October 2026	off–season	
Gigantes de Carolina	(Puerto Rico) Carlos Gonzales	Resigned	14 August 2026	(Puerto Rico) Juan Cardona	28 August 2026	off–season	
Cangrejeros de Santurce	(Puerto Rico) David Rosario (interim)	End of tenure as an interim coach.	?	(Puerto Rico) Carlos Gonzales	8 September 2026	off–season	
Piratas de Quebradillas	(Puerto Rico) Ángel Daniel Vassallo	Mutual agreement	August 2026	(United States) Brad Greenberg	6 August 2026	off–season	

- Atleticos de San German re-signed "Eddie Casiano.
- Leones de Ponce re-signed HC Carlos Rivera on August 22nd, 2026.

=== Free agency ===
Free agency negotiations began on October 1st, 2026.

=== Trades ===
Note: Players with a (R) are listed as Reinforcement Foreign Players, these are player's rights being traded if player returns to league.

Club (#1)	Outgoing player	Date of trade	Club (#2)	Outgoing player	Ref.
Off-Season trades
Piratas de Quebradillas	(Democratic Republic of the Congo) (United States) Emmanuel Mudiay (R); 2029 CAR first-round pick	23 September 2026	Gigantes de Carolina	(United States) Scottie James (R)	
Piratas de Quebradillas	(United States) (Puerto Rico) Nate Santos	23 September 2026	Leones de Ponce	(Puerto Rico) (United States Virgin Islands) Jordan Murphy; 2028 PON first-round pick	
Piratas de Quebradillas	(United States) Jayden Martínez	25 September 2026	Criollos de Caguas	(United States) Anthony Morales	
Cangrejeros de Santurce	(Puerto Rico) Ángel Matías; 2028 SAN first-round pick	6 October 2026	Leones de Ponce	(United States) (Puerto Rico) Aleem Ford; 2027 PON first-round pick (3rd pick)	
Cangrejeros de Santurce	(Puerto Rico) (United States Virgin Islands) Walter Hodge	15 October 2026	Capitanes de Arecibo	2029 ARE first-round pick	
Indios de Mayagüez	2027 MAY first-round pick (7th pick); 2029 MAY second-round pick 2030 MAY second-round pick Plus cash.	31 October 2026	Piratas de Quebradillas	(Dominican Republic) Victor Liz (United States) Anthony Cambo	
Cangrejeros de Santurce	(United States) DJ Wilson (R) (United States) Corey McKeithan; 2028 FAR first-round pick	31 October 2026	Cariduros de Fajardo	(United States) Kristian Doolittle (R) (United States) Mike Brusewitz (Puerto Rico) Giovanni Santiago	
Mets de Guaynabo	(United States) Javon Bennett (R)	2 November 2026	Leones de Ponce	(Puerto Rico) Johned Walker	

=== Reinforcement Foreign Players ===
The clubs can have a maximum of 3 foreign players in their Baloncesto Superior Nacional squads per match, but there is no limit of foreigners in the clubs' squads.

- To be Updated
- Players marked in **bold** indicate they were registered during mid-season.
- Players marked in italics indicate they had left their respective clubs sometime during season.

Club	Player 1	Player 2	Player 3	Former Players
Atléticos de San Germán				
Cangrejeros de Santurce				
Capitanes de Arecibo				
Cariduros de Fajardo				
Criollos de Caguas	(United States) Travis Trice			
Gigantes de Carolina	(Democratic Republic of the Congo) Emmanuel Mudiay			
Indios de Mayagüez				
Leones de Ponce				
Mets de Guaynabo				
Piratas de Quebradillas				
Santeros de Aguada	(Dominican Republic) Rigoberto Mendoza			
Vaqueros de Bayamón				
