= Dalmau (name) =

Dalmau is a Catalan given name (from Dalmatius) and surname. It may refer to:

== Given name ==
- Dalmau Moner (died 1341), Catalan Dominican priest and saint
- Dalmau de Queralt, Count of Santa Coloma (died 1640), Catalan noble and viceroy

== Surname ==
- Albert Dalmau (born 1992), Spanish footballer
- Christian Dalmau (born 1975), Puerto Rican basketball player
- Custo Dalmau (born 1959), Catalan fashion designer
- Gastón Dalmau (born 1983), Argentine actor and singer
- Jordi Dalmau (born 1989), Spanish motorcycle racer
- José Luis Dalmau (born 1966), Puerto Rican politician
- Juan Dalmau Ramírez (born 1973), Puerto Rican lawyer and politician
- Lluís Dalmau, Catalan painter of the 15th century
- Martín Dalmau, (born c. 1974) Argentine politician
- Raymond Dalmau (born 1948), Puerto Rican basketball player
- Ricardo Dalmau (born 1977), Puerto Rican basketball player
- Richie Dalmau (born 1973), Puerto Rican basketball player
