= Haanif Cheatham =

American basketball player

Personal information
- Born: September 6, 1996 (age 30) Pembroke Pines, Florida, U.S.
- Listed height: 6 ft 6 in (1.98 m)
- Listed weight: 193 lb (88 kg)

Career information
- High school: Pembroke Pines Charter (Pembroke Pines, Florida)
- College: Marquette (2015–2018); Florida Gulf Coast (2018–2019); Nebraska (2019–2020)
- NBA draft: 2020: undrafted
- Playing career: 2020–present

Career history
- 2020: Leones de Ponce
- 2021: Leones de Ponce
- 2021-2022: Apollon Limassol B.C.
- 2022: Piratas de Quebradillas
- 2022-2023: Artland Dragons

Haanif Cheatham (born September 6, 1996) is an American professional basketball player. He played college basketball for Nebraska, Florida Gulf Coast University and Marquette University.

== College career ==
=== Marquette (2015–2018) ===
In November 2014, Cheatham signed a National Letter of Intent to play college basketball at Marquette University. He was a consensus top-100 prospect by the leading national media outlets. He was rated 69th by Rivals.com, 70th by CBSSports.com and 80th in the ESPN rankings.

In 2015-16, Cheatham was named to the Big East Conference All-Freshman Team after starting all 31 games and averaging 11.5 points, 3.5 rebound and 2.2 assists per game. The next year, he was awarded the team's Best Defensive Player Award.

In November 2017, after averaging 8.2 points and 2.8 rebounds per game, Cheatham decided to leave the program for personal reasons.

=== Florida Gulf Coast (2018–2019) ===
In May 2018, Cheatham withdrew his name from the 2018 NBA Draft and returned to school joining Florida Gulf Coast University for the 2018–2019 season after transferring in January. He would not hire an agent, which allowed him to maintain his amateurism as he went through the evaluation process.

In August 2018, Cheatham was granted immediate eligibility for the 2018–2019 season after the university's compliance office received the waiver from the NCAA. He would have one season of eligibility remaining.

Cheatham was a Preseason All-Conference selection.

In November 2018, Cheatham was named the Atlantic Sun Conference Player and Newcomer of the Week.

After playing in ten games, in December 2018, Cheatham suffered a shoulder injury in practice that would lead him to have surgery. He was averaging 13.2 points and started in all 10 games but missed the remainder of the 2018–2019 season.

=== University of Nebraska (2019–2020) ===
In April 2019, Cheatham transferred to the University of Nebraska–Lincoln for the 2019–2020 season.

In March 2020, Cheatham was recognized by the Big Ten as Nebraska's nominee for the Big Ten Sportsmanship award. As one of two seniors on the team, he started in all 31 games that season and averaged a team-high 13 points per game.

== Professional career ==
In September 2020, Cheatham signed with Leones de Ponce for his rookie season. He was awarded All-Puerto Rican BSN All-Rookie Team for 2020.

In March 2021, Cheatham was signed to a multi-year deal with Leones de Ponce.

In January 2023, Cheatham signed with Artland Dragons for the 2023 season.

== Personal life ==
Cheatham is the son of Ingrid Weiss and Terry Cheatham. He has three sisters and one brother.
