= Orlando Vega =

Puerto Rican basketball player

Orlando Vega Smith
Personal information
- Born: June 16, 1968 (age 58) Brooklyn, New York
- Listed height: 6 ft 4 in (1.93 m)
- Listed weight: 195 lb (88 kg)

Career information
- High school: Oak Hill Academy (Mouth of Wilson, Virginia)
- Position: Shooting guard / small forward

Career highlights
- 2× BSN scoring champion (1998, 1999); Fourth-team Parade All-American (1988)

Orlando Vega
Medal record

Representing Puerto Rico

Men's basketball

Central American and Caribbean Games
Gold medal – first place	1993 Ponce, Puerto Rico	Team competition

Goodwill Games
Gold medal – first place	1994 Saint Petersburg, Russia	Team competition

Tournament of the Americas
Gold medal – first place	1995 Tucuman and Neuquen, Argentina	Team competition

Pan American Games
Bronze medal – third place	1999 Winnipeg	Team competition

Orlando Vega Smith (born June 16, 1968) is a retired basketball player from Puerto Rico.

== High school basketball ==
A 6' 4" shooting guard / small forward, Vega played for Oak Hill Academy, finishing the 1987–88 season with an average of 30.6 ppg, the highest single season scoring average in school history. Vega's highlights during that season included scoring 48 points against New Hampton School. For his performance that year, Vega was named the school's MVP. Also, during the 1988 Dapper Dan Roundball Classic, one of the nation's premier showcases for high school basketball talent, Vega earned the MVP trophy, beating out teammates, and future notable NBA players Alonzo Mourning, Chris Jackson, Billy Owens and Shawn Kemp. The opposing squad featured LaPhonso Ellis and Anthony Peeler. After the 1987–88 season, Vega was recruited by The University of Arizona and later transferred to Providence but never played. Instead, he returned to Puerto Rico and became a star on the island's professional circuit.

== National Superior Basketball League of Puerto Rico ==
In 1988 he made his debut on the National Superior Basketball League of Puerto Rico (BSN), playing for the Quebradillas Pirates. Vega quickly became an impact player, completing his rookie season with a respectable average of 18.7 ppg. Two seasons later, during the 1990 tournament he led the league in scoring, averaging 29.9 ppg along with 8.3 rpg while shooting 40% from three-point range. He played a total of 18 seasons in Puerto Rico with the Quebradillas Pirates, Caguas Creoles, Ponce Lions, Isabela Fighting Cocks, and the Arecibo Captains, finishing with career averages of 19.6 ppg, 5.3 rpg and a 36% effectiveness in 3pt field goal attempts. Vega signed a free-agent contract with the L.A. Clippers during the 1994 preseason, but did not make the roster.

== International career ==
He played in the 1994 and 1998 FIBA World Basketball Championship. He was also a member of the gold winning Puerto Rican National Basketball Team at the 1994 Goodwill Games held in Saint Petersburg, Russia. Vega won the bronze medal at the 1999 Pan American Games while also playing in the 1993 and 1998 Central American and Caribbean Games, the 1995(where the team won the gold medal) and 1999 FIBA Americas Championship, and in the 1995 and 1999 Pan American Games. Vega has played professionally in the Continental Basketball Association (CBA), Turkey, Venezuela, Cyprus and in Spain's Liga ACB, where he joined Caja Cantabria during the 1998 season, averaging 18.4 ppg.
