= Sammy Betancourt =

Puerto Rican basketball player

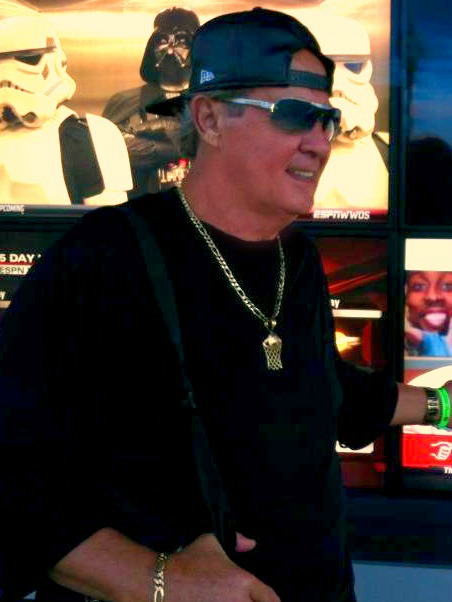
- Sammy Betancourt

Personal information
- Born: February 21, 1946 San Juan, Puerto Rico

Career information
- Playing career: 1966–1985

Career history
- 1965-83: Santos de San Juan
- 1983-84: Mets de Guaynabo
- 1984-85: Criollos de Caguas

Career highlights
- 3× BSN scoring champion (1972, 1975-1976)

Sammy Betancourt a.k.a. "The Sharpshooter" (born February 21, 1946) is a former basketball player who represented Puerto Rico in the 1975 Pan American Games.

On October 7, 2012, Betancourt was inducted into the Puerto Rico Sports Hall of Fame.

== Early years ==
Betancourt (birth name: Samuel Betancourt Fernandez) was born in Old San Juan and raised in San Juan, Puerto Rico. He was the youngest of four children: his brother Antonio, and his sisters Carmen and Michelle. At an early age he devoted himself to playing basketball in the local YMCA. At the age of 12 he began to stand out as a basketball player at under the tutelage of Mr. Millin Romero, and represented Puerto Rico in the Little Guys tournaments. Betancourt also trained as a Red Cross swimming and rescue instructor.

Betancourt represented different categories in his youth, including the First Category. He debuted in the Baloncesto Superior Nacional in 1966, with the Santos de San Juan (The San Juan Saints), together with Mr. John Elias and Mr. Tuto Marchan.

== Professional career ==
Betancourt was a devastating field-goal scorer, and a 90% free-throw shooter. For three seasons, he was the top league scorer: 1972 (726 points), 1975 (724 points) and 1976 (702 points). During the 1960s and 70's, he participated as a member of the Puerto Rico National Team in two Pan American Games and two Central American Games. In 1972, he was selected as the thirteenth player in the Puerto Rico National Team which represented Puerto Rico in Munich, Germany.

== Retirement ==
Betancourt played for 17 seasons with San Juan, the Mets de Guaynabo, and Caguas. He retired in 1985 as a member of the Criollos de Caguas.

During his career he scored 6,233 points, and a career average of 16.8 points per game. He also accumulated 343 assists, 1,370 rebounds, an average of 82% from the free throw line, and a 46% average when shooting from the field.

Betancourt was one of the first basketball players to score the mythical figure of 5,000 points.

After his retirement he coached in Isabela, Aibonito and Guaynabo. As a coach he achieved four Miguelito championships: Morovis (1987), Leones de Ponce (1990), Atléticos de San Germán (1997) and Vaqueros de Bayamón. The Capitanes de Arecibo won the sub-championship in 2007 and the championship in 2008, under the coaching directorship of Bentancourt and David Rosario. On October 7, 2012, Betancourt was inducted into the Puerto Rico Sports Hall of Fame.

Betancourt continues to be involved in basketball as a coach in the minor leagues. He teaches young people the skills and techniques required to play basketball, and is known for coaching up to 100 youngsters aged 5 to 17 in the Urbanización Santa Rita. He serves as an inspiration to the students of the schools of Sabanera, Dorado; Santa Rita, Vega Alta; and Toa Baja. His legacy also teaches the youth of Puerto Rico good moral values and the importance of making positive contributions to society.

He was married to Mrs. Gladys Quinteros, with whom he had five children: Samuel, Manny, Sammy Jr., Marcus and Miguel. His family and friends note that he loved basketball so much, that he sired an entire basketball team.

Betancourt currently resides in the town of Dorado with his wife Ivy Rodríguez, and his two stepchildren Jorge and Giliannie.

== See also ==
- List of Puerto Ricans
- Sports in Puerto Rico
- French immigration to Puerto Rico
