= Dalmatius (disambiguation) =

Dalmatius was a Roman caesar from 335 to 337.

Dalmatius may also refer to:

== Saints ==
- Dalmatius of Constantinople (d. 440), saint venerated in Constantinople
- Dalmatius of Pavia (d. 254 or 304), venerated as a saint by the Roman Catholic Church
- Dalmatius of Rodez, bishop of Rodez from 524 to 580

== Others ==
- Flavius Dalmatius, Roman censor (333), father of the caesar
- Dalmatius (bishop of Cyzicus) (fl. 427–449)
- Dalmatius (archbishop of Narbonne) (r. 1081–1097)

== See also ==
- Dalmau (name)
- San Dalmazio
