= Dalmazio =

Dalmazio may refer to:

- Dalmazio Moner (1291 - 1341), Spanish Roman Catholic priest
- Dalmazio Santini (1923 – October 4, 2001), Italian-born American composer
- Miriam Dalmazio (born 1987), Italian actress

== See also ==
- Dalmatius
- San Dalmazio (disambiguation)
