= Baloncesto Fuenlabrada =

- Nickname: Fuenla
- Leagues: Primera FEB
- Founded: 1983; 43 years ago
- History: C.B. Fuenlabrada (1983–1989); A.D. Fuenlabrada (1989–1991); Baloncesto Fuenlabrada (1991–2026); Partizan de Fuenlabrada (2026–present)
- Arena: Fernando Martín
- Capacity: 5,700
- Location: Fuenlabrada, Community of Madrid, Spain
- Team colors: Blue, White, Black
- President: José Quintana
- Head coach: Vacant
- Team captain: Christian Eyenga
- Championships: 1 LEB championship 2 Copa Príncipe de Asturias
- Website: baloncestofuenlabrada.com
Home	Away

Baloncesto Fuenlabrada, S.A.D., known as Partizan de Fuenlabrada since September 2026, or just as Fuenlabrada, is a professional basketball team based in Fuenlabrada, Spain. The team plays in the Primera FEB and plays their home games at Fernando Martín.

== History ==
Founded in 1983, Fuenlabrada started to compete at a local level. The club joined national competitions two years later and worked its way up, reaching the first regional division in the late 1980s. By 1991, it already became Baloncesto Fuenlabrada and a year later, it merged with CB Torrejón de Ardoz to compete in the Spanish second division.

In 1992, Fuenlabrada allowed KK Partizan to play in Fernando Martin Arena after Partizan was not allowed to play in Belgrade during the Yugoslav Wars where it would end in a historical season for Partizan with Aleksandar Đorđević's buzzer beater against Joventut Badalona in the 1992 FIBA European League Final Four where it would end 71-70 in favor of Partizan, giving them the title.

Fuenlabrada acquired Club Peñas Recreativas de Huesca's rights to earn the right to compete in the Spanish first division in the 1996–97 season. The club went down to the second division, but inked scoring machine Velimir Perasović and returned to the elite level a year later. With Perasović, Carlos Cazorla, Ferran Lopez and Salvador Guardia as its main pillars, the addition of Nate Huffman allowed Fuenlabrada to make it to the Spanish League playoffs in 1999 and their debut in the Korać Cup. Perasović kept filling the baskets for several seasons, leading Fuenlabrada to two more playoffs appearances in 2001 and 2002, helped by David Wood, Chuck Kornegay and a young José Manuel Calderón and coached by Óscar Quintana.

Fuenlabrada made its ULEB Cup debut in the 2002–03 season, in which Herrmann was chosen as the Spanish League MVP. The club returned to the Spanish second division in the year 2004 but came back, for good, a year later. Players like Saúl Blanco, Jorge García, Kristaps Valters and Brad Oleson kept Fuenlabrada in the first division for years without much trouble. The club returned to the Spanish League playoffs in the 2010–11 season with Salva Maldonado as head coach and a young Gustavo Ayón as its star center.

One year later, the club would be eliminated in the quarterfinals of the EuroChallenge by Triumph Lyubertsy. Despite this European achievement, Fuenlabrada would continue fighting to avoid relegation, finally being relegated to LEB Oro in 2015. However, the club continued in Liga ACB as Ford Burgos and Club Ourense Baloncesto would not fulfill the requirements for promoting.

Fuenlabrada took advantage and led by Marko Popović, Jonathan Tabu and Ivan Paunić, Fuenlabrada made it to the Spanish League playoffs, earning the right to return to the EuroCup 13 years later. In the 2016–2017 season, Fuenlabrada played well and qualified to the EuroCup Top16. However, they only finished 12th in the ACB. After a 9th-place finish in the 2017-2018 ACB season, Fuenlabrada earned the right to compete in the FIBA Basketball Champions League. Fuenlabrada won the first 3 games, before suffering a complete fiasco and finishing the tournament with 11 consecutive losses.

In September 2024, Flexicar, a Spanish company specialising in used-vehicle retail, became the club's main sponsor, giving the team its current commercial name, Flexicar Fuenlabrada.

On 10 September 2026, Fuenlabrada officially changed its name to Partizan de Fuenlabrada, celebrating a 35 year anniversary between the club and KK Partizan.

== Sponsorship naming ==
Baloncesto Fuenlabrada has had several denominations through the years due to its sponsorship:

- Maná Fuenlabrada 1986–1987
- Jabones Pardo Fuenlabrada 1999–2004
- Alta Gestión Fuenlabrada 2005–2009
- Ayuda en acción Fuenlabrada 2009–2010
- Mad-Croc Fuenlabrada 2012–2013
- Montakit Fuenlabrada 2014–2020
- Urbas Fuenlabrada 2020–2022
- Carplus Fuenlabrada 2022–2024
- Flexicar Fuenlabrada 2024–2026

== Team logos ==
Non-commercial logo

2005–2009

2009–2010

== Home arenas ==
- San Esteban Public High School Court (1983–88).
- Miguel Hernández Public High School Gymnasium (1988–91).
- Pabellón Fernando Martín (1991–present).

== Players ==
=== Retired numbers ===
Baloncesto Fuenlabrada retired numbers
No	Nat.	Player	Position	Tenure
2	(Croatia)	Marko Popović	PG	2015–2019
6	(Croatia)	Velimir Perasović	SG	1997–2002
8	(Spain)	Salva Guardia	PF	1996–2001, 2003–2008, 2010–2011
10	(Spain)	Ferrán López	PG	1997–2001, 2004–2009
13	(Spain)	Francesc Solana	SF	2002–2007

=== Other notable players ===
- (Canada) Kyle Alexander
- (Finland) Alex Murphy
- (Finland) Lassi Nikkarinen
- (United States) Anthony Brown
- (United States) Maurice Kemp
- (Dominican Republic) (United States) James Feldeine
- (Latvia) Mareks Mejeris
- (Latvia) Rolands Šmits
- (Estonia) Siim-Sander Vene
- (Lithuania) Virginijus Praškevičius
- (Lithuania) Egidijus Mockevičius

=== Current roster ===
Note: Flags indicate national team eligibility at FIBA-sanctioned events. Players may hold other non-FIBA nationalities not displayed.

Baloncesto Fuenlabrada roster
Players
Coaches

Pos.	No.	Nat.	Name	Ht.	Age
PG	0	(Spain)	López, Javi	1.90 m (6 ft 3 in)	27 – 6 May 1999
PG	7	(Argentina) (Italy)	Díaz, Mateo	1.86 m (6 ft 1 in)	24 – 6 March 2002
SG	8	(Brazil) (Italy)	Benite, Vítor	1.94 m (6 ft 4 in)	36 – 20 February 1990
C	9	(Spain)	Bilbao, Jorge	2.05 m (6 ft 9 in)	31 – 27 June 1995
C	11	(Brazil)	Cardoso, Brunão	2.02 m (6 ft 8 in)	23 – 11 November 2002
PF	18	(Spain)	Cruz-Uceda, Iván	2.08 m (6 ft 10 in)	34 – 24 October 1991
SF	22	(Puerto Rico) (United States)	Zhao, Jonathan	1.93 m (6 ft 4 in)	23 – 29 June 2003
C	23	(Serbia)	Huskić, Goran	2.10 m (6 ft 11 in)	34 – 26 February 1992
SF	35	(Republic of the Congo)	Belemene, Romaric	2.02 m (6 ft 8 in)	29 – 19 February 1997
SG	44	(United States) (Ghana)	Ali, Prince	1.93 m (6 ft 4 in)	30 – 11 August 1996

Head coach

- (Spain) Iñaki Martín

Assistant coach(es)

- (Spain) Borja González de Mendoza
- (Spain) David Gallego

Legend

- (C) Team captain
- (IN) Inactive player
- Injured

- Roster
Updated: September 21, 2026

== Head coaches ==
Managers since 1993:

- Óscar Quintana 1993–1995, 1997–2004, 2023
- Martín Fariñas 1995–1996
- Andreu Casadevall 1996–1997
- Luis Casimiro 2004–2008, 2014–2015
- Luis Guil 2008–2009
- Chus Mateo 2009, 2013–14
- Salva Maldonado 2009–2011
- Porfirio Fisac 2011–2012
- Trifón Poch 2012–2013
- Hugo López 2015
- Jesús Sala 2015
- Žan Tabak 2015
- Jota Cuspinera 2015–2017, 2019–2020
- Che García 2017–2018, 2018–2019
- Agustí Julbe 2018
- Paco García 2020
- Javier Juárez 2020–2021
- Josep Maria Raventós 2021–2022
- José Luis Pichel 2022–2023
- Toni Ten 2023–2025

== Season by season ==
Season	Tier	Division	Pos.	W–L	Copa del Rey	Other cups		European competitions		
1986–87	5	2ª Autonómica								
1987–88	4	1ª Autonómica								
1988–89	4	1ª Autonómica								
1989–90	4	1ª Autonómica								
1990–91	3	2ª División								
1991–92	3	2ª División	11th	6–16						
1992–93	2	1ª División	17th	16–18						
1993–94	2	1ª División	12th	22–10						
1994–95	2	Liga EBA	2nd	26–10						
1995–96	2	Liga EBA	3rd (Note: Bought the ACB berth to Grupo AGB Huesca.)							
1996–97	1	Liga ACB	18th	4–33						
1997–98	2	LEB	2nd	23–11		Copa Príncipe	C			
1998–99	1	Liga ACB	7th	18–19	Quarterfinalist					
1999–00	1	Liga ACB	15th	11–23				3 Korać Cup	GS	3–3
2000–01	1	Liga ACB	7th	20–17	Quarterfinalist					
2001–02	1	Liga ACB	7th	19–18				3 Korać Cup	QF	5–5
2002–03	1	Liga ACB	14th	14–20				2 ULEB Cup	RS	3–7
2003–04	1	Liga ACB	17th	13–21						
2004–05	2	LEB	1st	34–9		Copa Príncipe	C			
2005–06	1	Liga ACB	10th	15–19						
2006–07	1	Liga ACB	12th	14–20						
2007–08	1	Liga ACB	13th	13–21						
2008–09	1	Liga ACB	9th	15–17						
2009–10	1	Liga ACB	15th	12–22						
2010–11	1	Liga ACB	7th	20–16						
2011–12	1	Liga ACB	16th	12–22	Quarterfinalist			3 EuroChallenge	QF	11–4
2012–13	1	Liga ACB	14th	12–22						
2013–14	1	Liga ACB	15th	12–22						
2014–15	1	Liga ACB	18th (Note: Remained in Liga ACB due to the non-promotion of Ford Burgos and Club Ourense Baloncesto.)	8–26						
2015–16	1	Liga ACB	8th	17–19	Quarterfinalist					
2016–17	1	Liga ACB	12th	12–20				2 EuroCup	T16	6–8
2017–18	1	Liga ACB	9th	17–17	Quarterfinalist					
2018–19	1	Liga ACB	13th	13–21				3 Champions League	RS	3–11
2019–20	1	Liga ACB	17th (Note: Season curtailed due to the coronavirus pandemic.)	5–17		Supercopa	SF			
2020–21	1	Liga ACB	15th	12–24						
2021–22	1	Liga ACB	14th	12–22						
2022–23	1	Liga ACB	18th	4–30						
2023–24	2	LEB Oro	10th	16–18						
2024–25	2	Primera FEB	3rd	31–8		Spain Cup	GS			
2025–26	2	Primera FEB	7th	21–16		Spain Cup	SF			
2026–27	2	Primera FEB				Spain Cup	R32			

== Team records and awards ==
=== Records ===
- 20 seasons in ACB
- 2 seasons in LEB
- 2 seasons in EBA
- 2 seasons in Primera División B

=== Trophies ===
- LEB Oro: (1)
  - 2005
- Copa Príncipe de Asturias: (2)
  - 1998, 2005
- Torneo Comunidad de Madrid: (1)
  - 1998
- Liga de Verano ACB: (2)
  - 1996, 1999

=== Individual awards ===
ACB Most Valuable Player

- Wálter Herrmann – 2003

EuroCup Basketball Rising Star

- Rolands Šmits – 2017

ACB Rising Star

- Brad Oleson – 2009
- Gustavo Ayón – 2011

All-ACB Second Team

- Marko Popović – 2016

ACB Three Point Shootout Champion

- Sergiy Gladyr – 2012

== Baloncesto Fuenlabrada B ==
Baloncesto Fuenlabrada B, also known as Fundación Baloncesto Fuenlabrada, is the reserve team of Fuenlabrada. Originally created in 1995, it was re-opened in 2013 by achieving a vacant berth in LEB Plata.

In its first season after the re-opening, Fundación Baloncesto Fuenlabrada finished as champion of the 2013–14 LEB Plata and runner-up of the Copa LEB Plata. Despite promoting to LEB Oro, the club decided to continue playing in the same league of the previous season, but in Getafe as a result of a collaboration agreement with the town and CB Getafe, the main club in that city.

=== Naming ===
- Maná Fuenlabrada 1996–2001
- Reybol Fuenlabrada 2001–2002
- Maná Fuenlabrada 2002–2003
- Fuenlabrada-Getafe 2009–2011
- Fuenlabrada-Illescas 2011–2012
- Fundación Baloncesto Fuenlabrada 2013–2014
- Viten Getafe (see CB Getafe) 2014–2016
- Fundación Baloncesto Fuenlabrada 2016–

=== Season by season ===
Season	Tier	Division	Pos.	W–L	Cup competitions	
1996–97	3	Liga EBA	7th			
1997–98	3	Liga EBA	11th	6–16		
1998–99	3	Liga EBA	15th	9–21		
1999–00	3	Liga EBA	12th	9–17		
2000–01	4	Liga EBA	11th	12–18		
2001–02	4	Liga EBA	9th	17–17		
2002–03	4	Liga EBA	13th	11–19		
2003–04	5	1ª División				
2004–05	4	Liga EBA	16th	7–23		
2005–06	5	1ª División	3rd	18–8		
2006–07	5	1ª División	1st	24–5		
2007–08	5	Liga EBA	7th	14–16		
2008–09	5	Liga EBA	7th	15–13		
2009–10	4	Liga EBA	11th	11–19		
2010–11	4	Liga EBA	15th	7–23		
2011–12	4	Liga EBA	16th	3–27		
2012–13	Did not enter any competition					
2013–14	3	LEB Plata	1st (Note: Resigned to promote to LEB Oro.)	17–7	Copa LEB Plata	RU

=== Trophies ===
- LEB Plata: (1)
  - 2014
