= San Dalmazio =

San Dalmazio may refer to:

- San Dalmazio, Pomarance, an human settlement in Tuscany, in central Italy, frazione of Pomarance
- San Dalmazio, Volterra, Roman Catholic church in Volterra, Tuscany, central Italy

== See also ==
- Dalmazio (disambiguation)
