= Richie Dalmau =

Puerto Rican basketball player

Medal record

Men's basketball

Representing Puerto Rico

FIBA AmeriCup
Bronze medal – third place	2003 Puerto Rico	

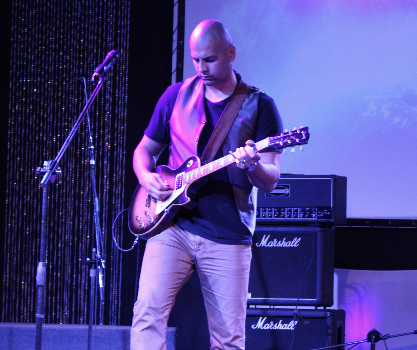
Richie Dalmau performing live

Raymond "Richie" Dalmau (born 1973 in Arecibo, Puerto Rico) is a retired basketball player from Puerto Rico, the eldest son of the legendary Raymond Dalmau. He began his professional career in 1991 with the Capitanes de Arecibo under the guidance of his father. The next year he moved to the team where his father spent his career, the Piratas de Quebradillas.

He became a basketball star while he played with Quebradillas, earning a spot in the Puerto Rican National Team in 1995. He still holds that spot as a backing Point Guard. With the National Team he has participated in many International events, among them the 1996 Olympics and the 1998 and 2002 World Tournaments.

He participated in two Puerto Rican League Finals in the years 1999 and 2000, losing both of them to the Cangrejeros de Santurce. In 2001 he was named the League's Most Outstanding Player. In 2002 he participated in the NBA's National Basketball Development League (NBDL) with the Fayetteville Patriots and the Roanoke Dazzle.

By the end of the 2003 season, the Quebradillas Pirates had many financial problems and they lost the rights to all their players. Richie and his brother Ricardo moved to the Indios de Mayaguez.

For the 2005 season, the Dalmau brothers signed with the Cangrejeros de Santurce, which their father Raymond will coach. During this time Richie and his brother Ricardo won their first championship on the league in 2007. Richie signed again with the Cangrejeros de Santurce in 2007 for three years. He has two younger brothers who also play in the BSN; Christian and Ricardo.

Richie is also the founder of a rock band named "Sueño de Hormiga" where he plays the guitar. "Sueño de Hormiga" will release it first CD album during 2008 where Richie is the executive producer.

Dalmau has also contributed to improving Puerto Rico's public education system. In 2008, he and his brother Ricardo Dalmau participated in Sapientis Week, an initiative sponsored by the non-profit Sapientis which brings distinguished public figures into classrooms in order to raise the public's awareness of the education crisis in Puerto Rico.

== Career stats ==
Dalmau's NBA Development League stats in 14 games are 0 games started, 75 points with a 5.4 PPG, 35 assists with a 2.5 APG, 25 rebounds with a 1.8 RPG, 9 steals with a 0.6 SPG, .422 field goal percentage, .250 three point percentage and .731 free-throw percentage.
