= Puerto Rico Coalition for Equity and Educational Quality =

Coalition for Equity and Educational Quality
- Abbreviation: CECE
- Formation: 2011 (15 years ago)
- Type: lobby group
- Headquarters: San Juan, Puerto Rico
- Region served: Puerto Rico
- Members: voluntary
- Parent organization: Sapientis

The Puerto Rico Coalition for Equity and Educational Quality —Spanish: Coalición por la Equidad y Calidad Educativa (CECE) — is a non-profit lobby group that advocates for changes in public policy aimed towards improving the quality of public education in Puerto Rico. The group is focused on raising awareness of the challenges faced by school directors and advocates before the Legislative Assembly of Puerto Rico, especially towards members of the Senate of Puerto Rico Commission on Education and Family Affairs and the House of Representatives of Puerto Rico Commission on Education and Nonprofit Organizations and Cooperatives. The group is led by Sapientis.
