= Neftalí Rivera =

Puerto Rican basketball player

Personal information
- Born: November 3, 1948 Manhattan, New York
- Died: December 23, 2017 (aged 69) Hato Rey, Puerto Rico
- Listed height: 5 ft 11 in (1.80 m)
- Listed weight: 174 lb (79 kg)

Career information
- Playing career: 1969–1983
- Position: Shooting guard

Career history
- 1969—1981: Piratas de Quebradillas
- 1982—1983: Leones de Ponce

Career highlights
- 4× BSN champion (1970, 1977–1979); BSN Most Valuable Player (1973); BSN scoring champion (1969, 1973); BSN Rookie of the Year (1969)

Career statistics
- Points: 7,482 (19.2 ppg)
- Rebounds: 1,052 (2.7 rpg)
- Assists: 1,291 (3.3 apg)
Medals
Men's basketball
Representing Puerto Rico
Pan American Games
Silver medal – second place	1975 Mexico City	Team
Silver medal – second place	1971 Santiago de Cali	Team

Neftalí Rivera Oliveras (November 3, 1948 – December 23, 2017) was a Puerto Rican basketball player who competed in the 1972 Summer Olympics and in the 1976 Summer Olympics. He holds the record for most points in a game in the Baloncesto Superior Nacional when he scored 79 points on May 22, 1974. In that game he achieved the record by making 34 field goals (all of them 2-pointers as the 3-pointers were not adopted back then) and 11 free throws. He died on December 23, 2017, at Auxilio Mutuo Hospital in Hato Rey, Puerto Rico, due to respiratory problems.

== Career ==
Rivera played for 15 seasons in the BSN. He made his debut in 1969 with the Piratas de Quebradillas and retired in 1983 with the Leones de Ponce. His first 13 seasons were spent with the Piratas, where he won four championships in the seasons of 1970, 1977, 1978, and 1979.

Since his debut Rivera was an impact player in the BSN league. As a rookie in the BSN he averaged 22.3 points to be the league's scoring champion and that same season he won the Rookie of the Year award. In the 1973 season he was once again the league's scoring champion with an average of 25.2 points and was the first player to surpass 800 points in a season. His achievements in 1973 included winning the BSN Most Valuable Player award.

On May 22, 1974, he established the record for most points scored in a game in the BSN league when he scored 79 in the victory of the Piratas over the Taínos de Mayagüez with a score of 153–82. In the same game he also set new league records by scoring 34 field baskets in the game, getting 52 points in the second half, and scoring 25 field baskets in that second half. His teammate Raymond Dalmau scored 30 points in that same game, thus they combined for 109 points, breaking the record for most points by team duo in the league.

Rivera became part of the national team in 1969, the same year he debuted in the BSN league. His first tournament with the team was at the Centrobasket in 1969 where he was the second best scorer of the tournament with an average of 20.5 points and was the leader of basket scored with 72. In that tournament, held in Cuba, the Puerto Rican squad won the bronze medal. During his career in the national team, he participated in three Central American Games (1970, 1974 and 1978), two Pan American Games (1971 and 1975), two Olympic Games (1972 and 1976), two FIBA World Championships (1974 and 1978), and one FIBA Championship Americas which was held in 1980 in San Juan.

== See also ==
- List of Puerto Ricans
- Teófilo Cruz
- Mario Morales
