= Ricardo Dalmau =

Puerto Rican basketball player

Medal record

Men's basketball

Representing Puerto Rico

Pan American Games
Bronze medal – third place	1999 Winnipeg	Team competition

Ricardo Dalmau Santana (born August 27, 1977, in Mayaguez, Puerto Rico) is the youngest of three children of the legendary basketball player Raymond Dalmau. He began his professional basketball career in 1995 with the Polluelos de Aibonito, under the coaching of his father. That year he earned the Puerto Rican League's Rookie of the Year Award. The next year, he joined his eldest brother Richie in the Piratas de Quebradillas, the basketball team where his father spent his entire career.

Alongside his brother Richie Dalmau, he led Quebradillas to two Puerto Rican League Finals in 1999 and 2000, losing both of them to the Cangrejeros de Santurce. He participated with the Puerto Rican National Team in 1998 and 2002.

By the end of 2003, Quebradillas had many financial problems and they lost the rights to all their players. Ricardo and his brother Richie moved to the Indios de Mayagüez for the 2004 season. However, both of them reunited with their father Raymond when they signed contracts with the Cangrejeros de Santurce for the 2005 season. Raymond was the head coach of the team. In the Cangrejeros of Santurce they contributed to the 2007 Puerto Rican national championship.

Ricardo is also a Certified Public Accountant (CPA) and has been awarded by the Puerto Rico State CPA Association for his contribution to the accounting practice.

Dalmau has also contributed to improving Puerto Rico's public education system. In 2008, he and his brother Richie Dalmau participated in Sapientis Week, an initiative sponsored by the non-profit Sapientis which brings distinguished public figures into classrooms in order to raise the public's awareness of the education crisis in Puerto Rico. Since 2009 he served as Director of Audit Office Sports and Recreation Department. In 2011 the governor of Puerto Rico, Luis G. Fortuño, announced the appointment of Ricardo Dalmau Santana to the post of Inspector General of Puerto Rico which was approved by the House and Senate.
