= Jonathan Zhao =

Puerto Rican basketball player (born 2003)

Baloncesto Fuenlabrada
- Title: Guard
- League: Primera FEB

Personal information
- Born: July 29, 2003 (age 23)
- Listed height: 6 ft 4 in (1.93 m)
- Listed weight: 180 lb (82 kg)
- Position: Shooting guard

Career history
- 2025-present: Capitanes de Arecibo
- 2025–2026: CB Zaragoza
- 2026–present: Baloncesto Fuenlabrada

Jonathan Thomas Zhao-Olmos (born July 29, 2003) is an American basketball player with Puerto Rican nationality. He plays as an guard and his current team is Baloncesto Fuenlabrada of the Primera FEB..

== Sports career ==
Zhao is a trained player at Carson-Newman University located in Jefferson City, Tennessee, where he would compete in the NCAA Division II with the Carson-Newman Eagles, from 2021 to 2025.

In 2025, he signed for the Capitanes de Arecibo of the Baloncesto Superior Nacional.

On July 19, 2025, he signed for CB Zaragoza of the Segunda FEB.

On April 13, 2026, he became the MVP of matchday 25 by achieving 31 rating points supported by another 31 points, 10 rebounds, 1 recovery and 6 fouls received against Albacete Basket.

On August 20, 2026, he signed for the Baloncesto Fuenlabrada of the Primera FEB.

On November 8, 2026, it was announced he was on the Capitanes roster, for the Baloncesto Superior Nacional 2027 season.
