= Adolfo Porrata =

Puerto Rican basketball player (1948–2026)

Personal information
- Nationality: Puerto Rican
- Born: 10 May 1948 Santurce, Puerto Rico
- Died: 26 July 2026 (aged 78)

Sport
- Sport: Basketball

Adolfo Porrata Doria (10 May 1948 – 26 July 2026) was a Puerto Rican basketball player. He competed in the men's tournament at the 1968 Summer Olympics. Porrata died on 26 July 2026, at the age of 78.
