= Raymond Dalmau =

Puerto Rican basketball player

Personal information
- Born: October 27, 1948 (age 78) San Juan, Puerto Rico
- Listed height: 6 ft 4 in (1.93 m)
- Listed weight: 220 lb (100 kg)

Career information
- Playing career: 1966–1985
- Position: Power forward
- Coaching career: 1990–2013

Career history

Playing
- 1966–1985: Piratas de Quebradillas

Career highlights
- 4× BSN champion (1970, 1977–1979); 3× BSN MVP (1968, 1969, 1972); 2× BSN scoring champion (1968, 1970); No. 14 retired by Puerto Rico National Team

Career BSN statistics
- Points: 11,592 (21.6 ppg)
- Rebounds: 5,673 (10.6 rpg)
- Assists: 2,302 (5.1 apg)
Medals
Men's basketball
Representing Puerto Rico
Pan American Games
Silver medal – second place	1979 San Juan
Silver medal – second place	1971 Santiago de Cali

Raymond Dalmau Pérez (born October 27, 1948) is a retired Puerto Rican professional basketball player and coach. Dalmau played in the Baloncesto Superior Nacional (BSN), the top tier basketball league in the country, for 20 seasons with the Piratas de Quebradillas. At the time of his retirement, at the end of the 1985 season, Dalmau was the BSN's all-time leader in points (11,592), rebounds (5,673) and assists (2,302).

== Career ==
Dalmau grew up in Harlem, New York. From there he came to Puerto Rico for the first time in 1966, recruited by Raymond Burgos to reinforce the Piratas de Quebradillas in the BSN. At that time, players of Puerto Rican descent were recognized as imported into the tournament.

Dalmau had a very immediate impact in the league despite being only 17 years old. In his rookie year he finished second in scoring with an average of 18.4 points and 8.3 rebounds.

“In New York, I learned to play in Harlem, where the best players in the nation came from. And from an early age I was used to playing at a high level. And when I got to the league, people for the first time saw a tall player (6'4 ") with dribbling skills, jumping and long distance shooting. For that time, the big men only played near the basket. And since I had other resources, it was easy for me to master tall players.”

— Dalmau, in regard to how he was able to dominate in the BSN league from his early years

In 1968, Dalmau lead the league in scoring. He repeated as scoring champion in 1970, when he won his first championship as a member of the Piratas de Quebradillas. Dalmau, along with other 'Nuyoricans' such as Neftalí Rivera and Néstor Cora in the Piratas team, dominated in the BSN league in the 1970s, reaching the BSN finals eight times and winning the championship on four occasions including back to back to back titles in 1977, 1978 and 1979. He won the BSN Most Valuable Player award three times.

He was in conversations in 1975 to sign a contract with the former Utah Stars in the ABA (American basketball association) but he declined to maintain his amateur status. Professional basketball players were not allowed at that time to play for their countries in international competition.

In 1982, Dalmau and Quebradillas returned to the BSN finals, but they lost to Mario Morales and the Guaynabo Mets in six games.

Dalmau participated in three Summer Olympics. He held the record for the most career points scored in the BSN league when he retired after scoring over 11,000 points in his career. He currently is in fifth place in the all-time scoring list and fourth in the all-time rebounding list of the BSN league.

Throughout his career, he was known not only for his abilities on the court, but also for his competitive spirit, which led him to do his best even when paired against taller and stronger rivals in international competitions.

== Retirement and coaching years ==
In 1985, Dalmau retired from basketball as a player, going on to coaching in the BSN for many years. He has also coached in Venezuela for a number of years.

He had success as coach for the Puerto Rico national basketball team. He won gold in the 1989 Tournament of the Americas and a fourth place in the 1990 FIBA World Championship.

== Personal life ==
Dalmau is married to Sandra Ortiz. They have three sons Christian, Richie, and Ricardo, and one daughter, Natalia. All three sons were basketball players in the BSN and also were part of the Puerto Rico national team.

In 1993, Dalmau was diagnosed with colon cancer, from which he recuperated. During a 2005 television show where he and Eddie Miró were being introduced as spokesmen in Puerto Rico for colon cancer, he quipped that, at his age, he can still jog everyday from Santurce to past the Luis Muñoz Marín International Airport in Isla Verde, which constitutes a considerable distance (more than five miles). On June 16, 2008, a project was approved by the Puerto Rico House of Representatives, in which Dalmau's name was going to be used for a coliseum being built in Quebradillas.

== In popular culture ==
In the 1996 film Basquiat, Benicio del Toro made a homage to Dalmau by wearing a replica of his Puerto Rico men's national basketball team uniform with his distinctive number (14) fourteen. According to the IMDB, his character Benny's last name is Dalmau.

== See also ==
- List of Puerto Ricans
- Teófilo Cruz
- Mario Morales
