= Malachi Smith =

Malachi Smith may refer to:

- Malachi Smith (basketball) (born 1999), American basketball player
- Malachi Smith (poet), Jamaican poet
- Malachi Smith (rugby league) (born 2005), Australian rugby league footballer
