= Martín Ansa =

Puerto Rican basketball player

Personal information
- Nationality: Puerto Rican
- Born: September 27, 1941 Bayamón, Puerto Rico
- Died: October 26, 2024 (aged 83) Miami, Florida

Sport
- Sport: Basketball

Martín Ansa Ortiz (born 27 September 1941) is a Puerto Rican basketball player. He competed in the men's tournament at the 1964 Summer Olympics.
