= Aleem Ford =

American-Puerto Rican basketball player

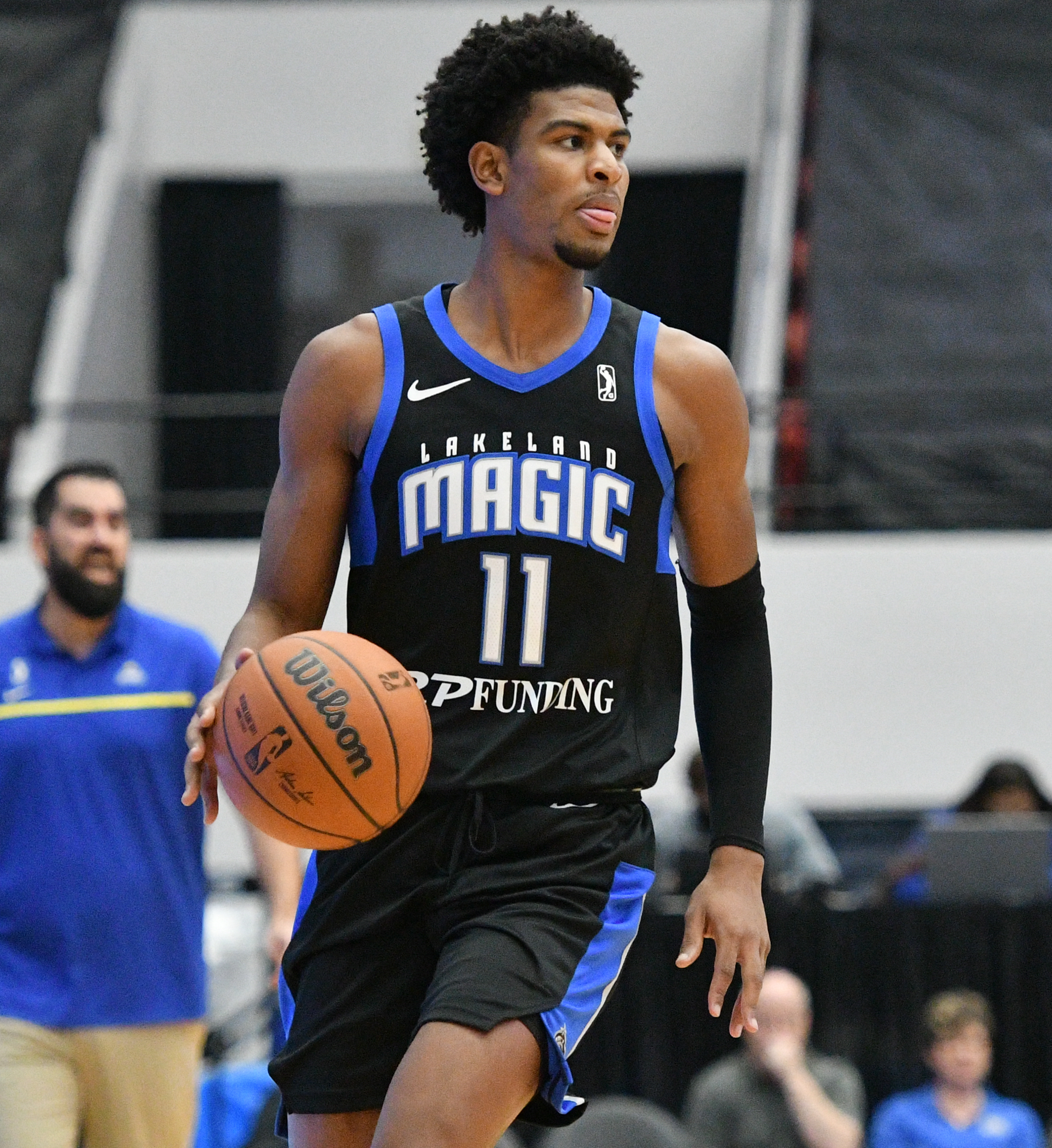

No. 12 – Leones de Ponce
- Position: Small forward
- League: BSN; FIBA Americas League

Personal information
- Born: December 22, 1997 (age 28) Lawrenceville, Georgia, U.S.
- Listed height: 6 ft 8 in (2.03 m)
- Listed weight: 220 lb (100 kg)

Career information
- High school: Archer (Lawrenceville, Georgia); IMG Academy (Bradenton, Florida)
- College: Wisconsin (2016–2021)
- NBA draft: 2021: undrafted
- Playing career: 2021–present

Career history
- 2021–present: Leones de Ponce
- 2021–2022: Lakeland Magic
- 2021: Orlando Magic
- 2022–2023: Lakeland Magic
- 2023–2024: Cleveland Charge
- 2024: Wisconsin Herd
- 2024: Rip City Remix
- Stats at NBA.com
- Stats at Basketball Reference

Aleem Ford (born December 22, 1997) is an Puerto Rican professional basketball player for the Leones de Ponce of the Baloncesto Superior Nacional (BSN) and the FIBA Americas League. He played college basketball for the Wisconsin Badgers.

== High school career ==
Ford initially attended Archer High School, where he averaged 14.2 points, 6.8 rebounds and 2.2 blocks as a senior, earning All-Region 8-AAAAAA honors. He later joined IMG Academy in Florida as a post-graduate player, averaging 13.9 points and 6.3 rebounds per game.

== College career ==
Ford redshirted his true freshman season at Wisconsin. He averaged 5.8 points and 2.8 rebounds per game as a redshirt freshman. Following the season, he underwent knee surgery. Ford averaged 3.1 points and 1.9 rebounds per game as a sophomore. He averaged 8.6 points and 4.4 rebounds per game as a junior. As a senior, Ford averaged 8.7 points, 4.2 rebounds, and 1.1 assists per game.

== Professional career ==
=== Leones de Ponce (2021) ===
Ford began his professional career in 2021 with the Leones de Ponce of the Puerto Rican Baloncesto Superior Nacional, after being selected first in their draft. In 32 games, he averaged 7.6 points, 2.7 rebounds, 0.8 assists, 0.4 steals and 0.2 blocks per game.

=== Lakeland / Orlando Magic (2021–2022) ===
After going undrafted in the 2021 NBA draft, Ford signed with the Lakeland Magic of the NBA G League on November 4, 2021. In 12 games, he averaged 9.6 points, 4.4 rebounds and 1.3 assists in 28.1 minutes per game.

On December 17, 2021, Ford was one of four players signed to 10-day contracts by the Orlando Magic of the National Basketball Association, when the team did not have enough players to play their home game that evening due to league COVID-19 protocols. He made his NBA debut that evening, scoring 2 points and recording a steal in a 115–105 loss to the Miami Heat. On December 27, he was reacquired by Lakeland.

=== Return to Leones de Ponce (2022) ===
After the conclusion of the G League season, Ford returned to Leones de Ponce.

=== Return to Lakeland (2022–2023) ===
On November 3, 2022, Ford was named to the opening night roster for the Lakeland Magic.

=== Third stint with Leones de Ponce (2023) ===
On March 30, 2023, Ford returned to Leones de Ponce of the Puerto Rican league

=== Cleveland Charge (2023–2024) ===
On October 21, 2023, Ford signed with the Cleveland Cavaliers, but was waived the same day, and one week later, he signed with the Cleveland Charge of the NBA G League.

=== Wisconsin Herd (2024) ===
On March 4, 2024, Ford was traded to the Wisconsin Herd.

=== Third stint with Leones (2024) ===
In April, 2024, Ford returned to the Leones de Ponce.

=== Rip City Remix (2024–present) ===
On October 28, 2024, Ford joined the Rip City Remix.

== International career ==
Ford is of Puerto Rican descent. He opted to play for the Puerto Rico men's national basketball team for the 2023 FIBA Basketball World Cup.

== Career statistics ==
Legend
GP	Games played	GS	Games started	MPG	Minutes per game
FG%	Field goal percentage	3P%	3-point field goal percentage	FT%	Free throw percentage
RPG	Rebounds per game	APG	Assists per game	SPG	Steals per game
BPG	Blocks per game	PPG	Points per game	**Bold**	Career high

=== NBA ===
Year	Team	GP	GS	MPG	FG%	3P%	FT%	RPG	APG	SPG	BPG	PPG
2021–22	Orlando	5	0	14.8	.300	.133	—	3.0	.4	.2	.0	2.8
Career		5	0	14.8	.300	.133	—	3.0	.4	.2	.0	2.8

=== College ===
Year	Team	GP	GS	MPG	FG%	3P%	FT%	RPG	APG	SPG	BPG	PPG
2016–17	Wisconsin	Redshirt										
2017–18	Wisconsin	**33**	20	24.4	.400	**.409**	.818	2.8	.9	.3	.2	5.8
2018–19	Wisconsin	31	0	13.8	.340	.288	**1.000**	1.9	.4	.3	.1	3.1
2019–20	Wisconsin	31	**31**	25.1	**.432**	.342	.694	**4.4**	**1.1**	.5	.4	8.6
2020–21	Wisconsin	31	**31**	**26.4**	.406	.341	.781	4.2	**1.1**	**.6**	**.5**	**8.7**
Career		126	82	22.5	.403	.348	.763	3.3	.9	.4	.3	6.5

== Personal life ==
The son of Steven and Zoraya Ford, he has an older sister, Medeenah. He majored in Communication Arts.
