= San Dalmazio, Volterra =

Church in Volterra, Italy

San Dalmazio
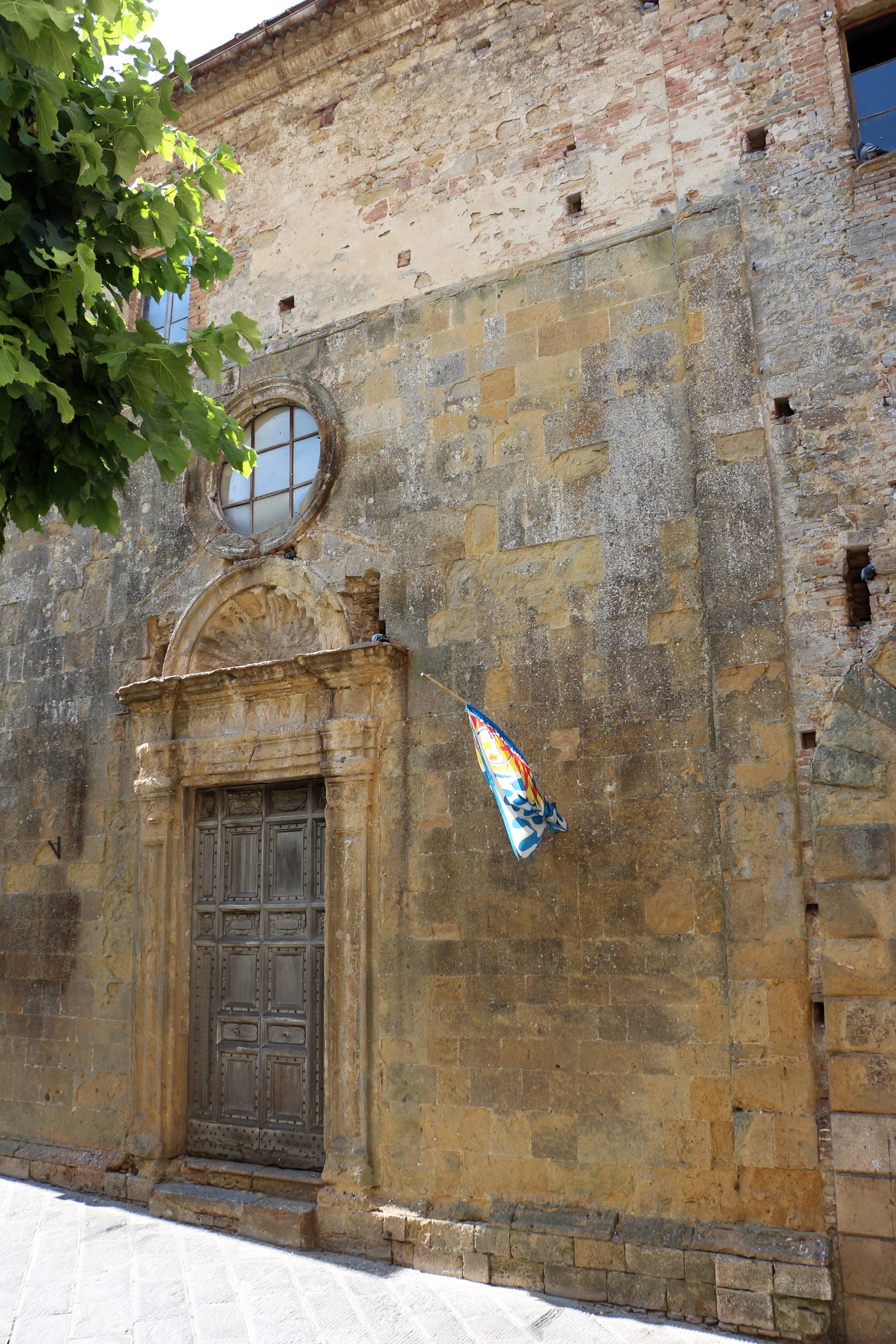

Religion
- Affiliation: Roman Catholic
- Province: Pisa

Location
- Location: Volterra, Italy
- Interactive map of San Dalmazio
- Coordinates: 43.404017°N 10.855658°E

Architecture
- Architect: Bartolomeo Ammannati (facade)
- Type: Church
- Style: Renaissance
- Groundbreaking: 1511

San Dalmazio is a Roman Catholic church located on Via San Lino, near Porta San Francesco, of Volterra, province of Pisa, region of Tuscany, Italy. The aged facade is built in local stone in a Renaissance-style, but the interior has a late Baroque decoration.

== History ==
The church was part of a Benedictine order nunnery, with the present facade attributed to Bartolomeo Ammannati, begun in 1540 and consecrated in 1547. The Benedictines located here in the early 12th century, until they ultimately were suppressed in 1786 by Leopold I, Grand-Duke of Tuscany. The adjacent convent initially was converted into a school, and later became residential.

The interior was refurbished with elegant stucco, some gilded, in the early 18th century. The main altarpiece is a Deposition from the Cross (1551) by Giovanni Paolo Rossetti. The fresco in the apse cupola depicts the Apotheosis of St Dalmatius, Bishop of Pedona (1709) by Ranieri del Pace. The first altarpiece on the right, somewhat degraded, depicts the scene of Noli me tangere by Giovanni Balducci. The altarpiece on the left of the church, depicts The Virgin with Saints Mary Magdalen, Catherine of Alexandria, passing the image of Dominic of Soriano to the Blessed Giordano da Rivalto by Jacopo Vignali. The ovals along the nave depict events in the Life of St Benedict by Giovanni Sagrestani

== Gallery ==
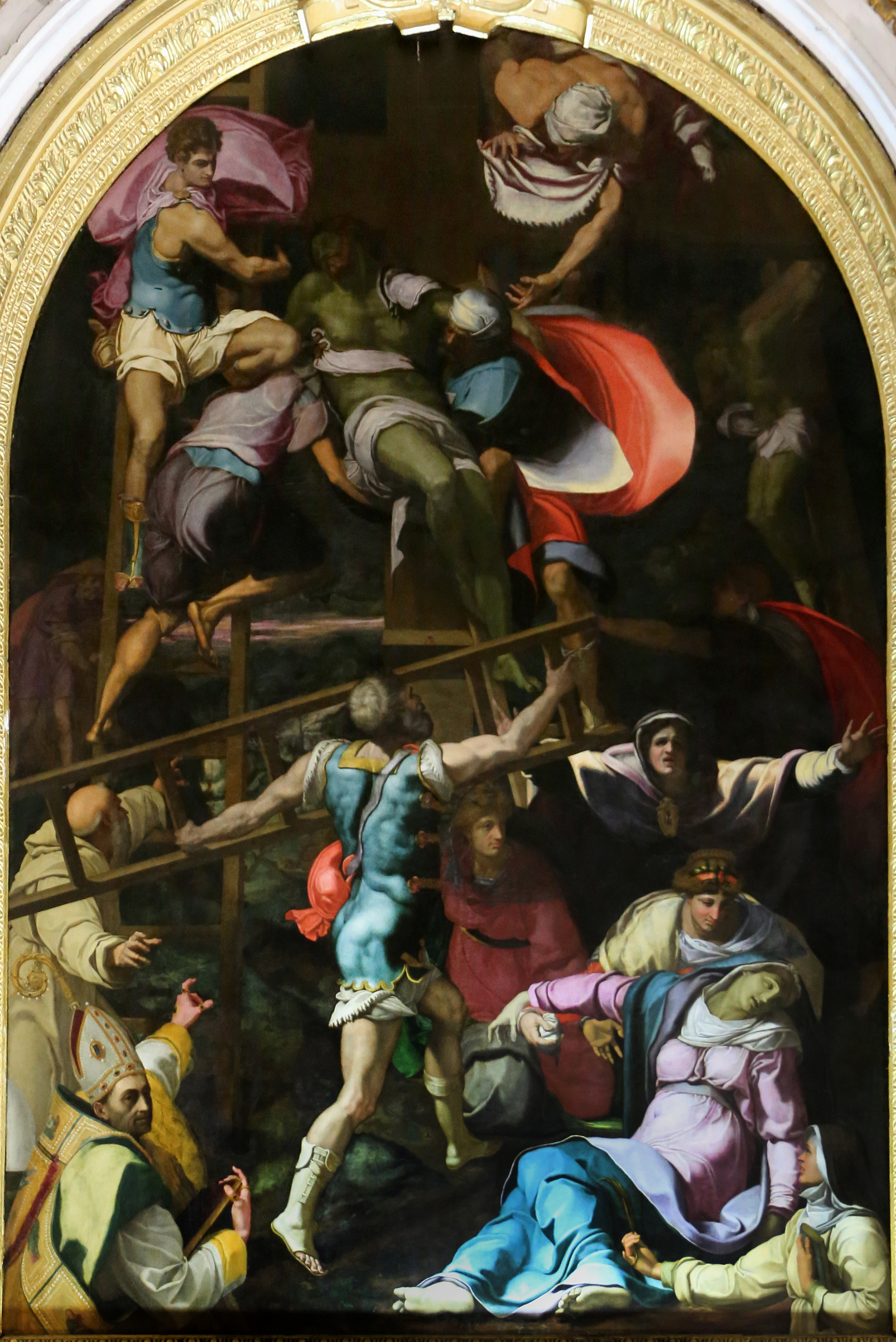
Deposition from the Cross by Rossetti

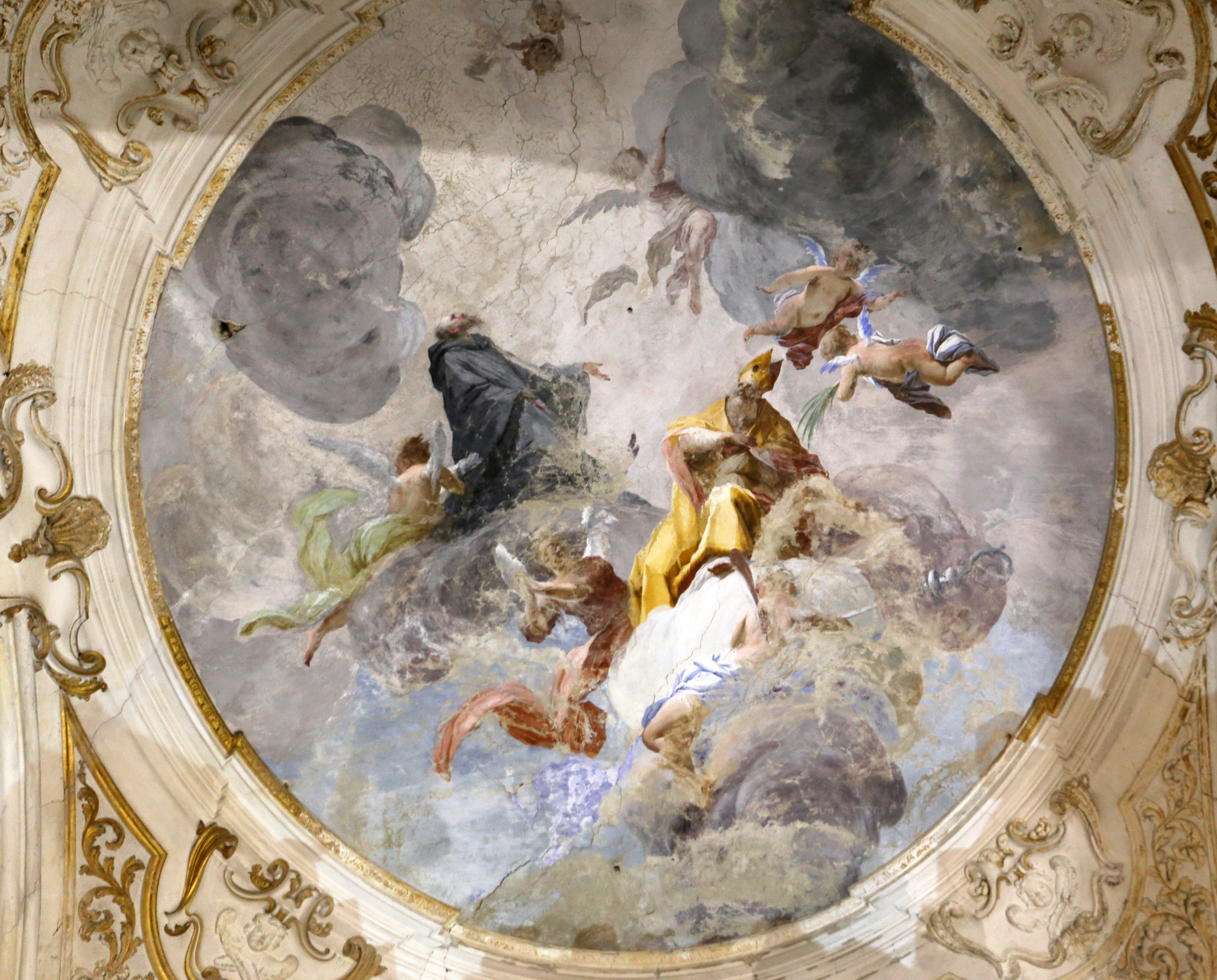
Apotheosis of St Dalmazio by Ranieri del Pace

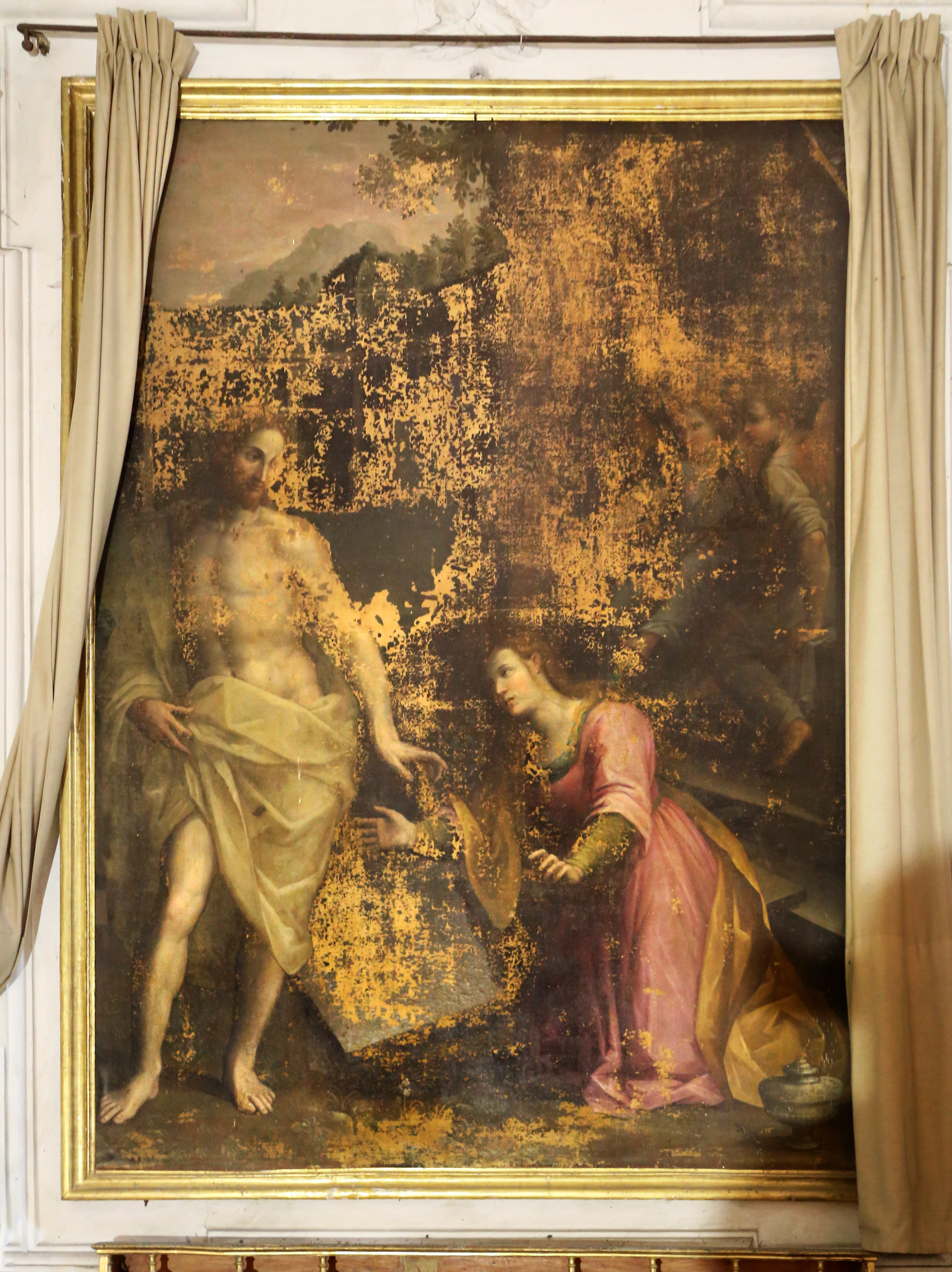
Noli me Tangere by Balducci

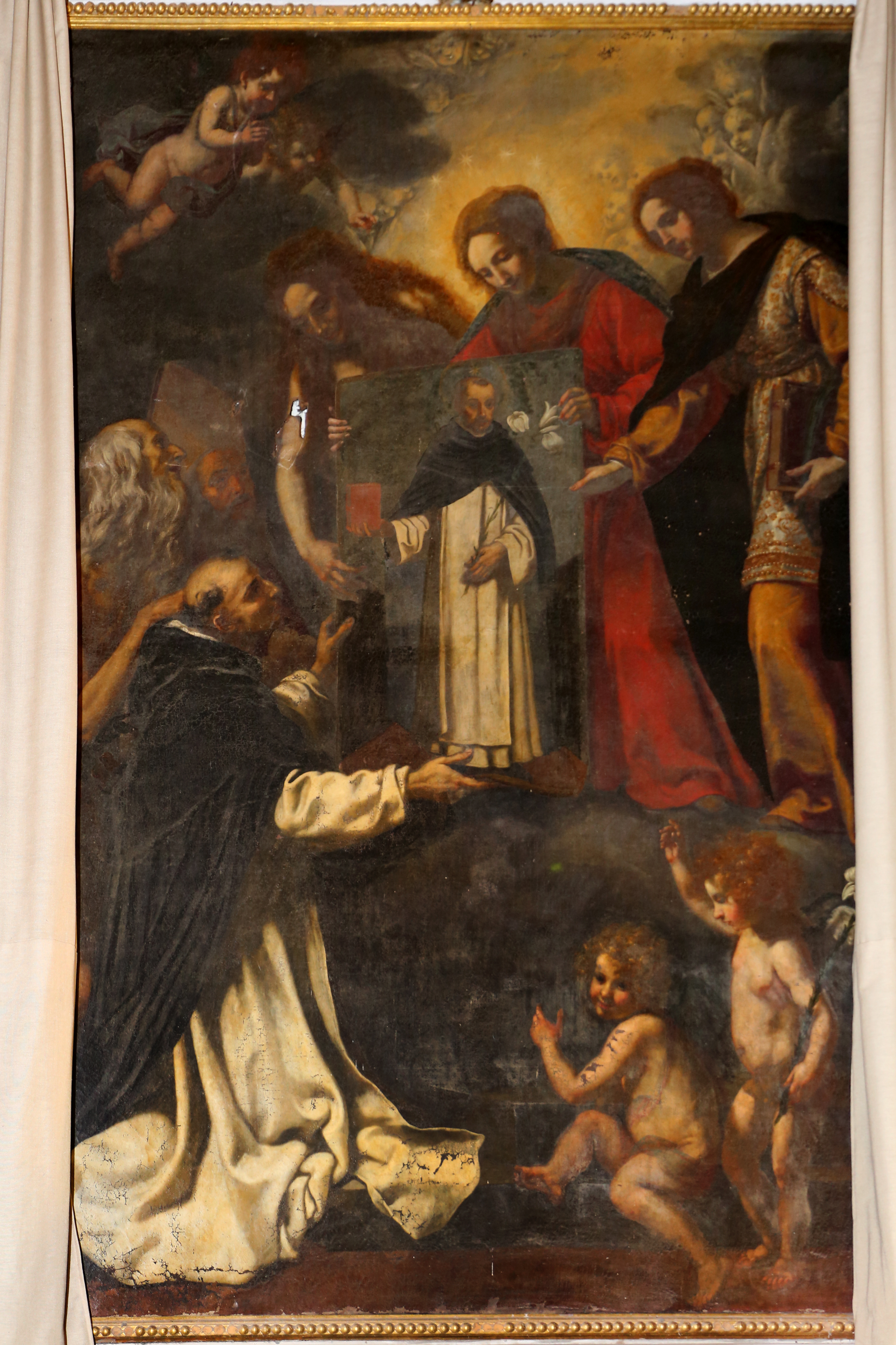
Altarpiece by Vignali
