= Piratas de Quebradillas =

Puerto Rican basketball team

- Nickname: "Pirates"
- League: BSN
- Founded: (1926-2004); (2009-2014); (2016-present)
- Arena: Raymond Dalmau Coliseum
- Capacity: 7,000
- Location: Quebradillas, Puerto Rico
- Team colors: Red, black, white, gray
- Head coach: Brad Greenberg
- Ownership: Ernesto “Ernie” Cambo
- Championships: 6 (1970, 1977, 1978, 1979, 2013, 2017)
- Website: www.piratasbsnpr.com
Home	Away	Third

The Piratas de Quebradillas are a professional basketball team based in Quebradillas, Puerto Rico, that plays in Baloncesto Superior Nacional (BSN), the top flight of Puerto Rico's basketball system. Founded in the mid 1920s, it is one of the original teams of the league. The club enjoyed its most successful era during the 1970s, when they won four championships, including a three-peat, and participated in six league finals. However, after the 2004 season, the team suffered from financial problems, which prevented them from participating in the following five seasons. The club returned to active competition in 2009 with new players and a new arena, as well as a trip to the league finals. After a 34 years hiatus, in 2013 they won the BSN championship, defeating the Leones de Ponce in a six game series.

== Early history ==
The Piratas de Quebradillas basketball club was founded in 1926 and was one of the original founding teams of the Puerto Rican Basketball League. Among its early star players where Quiro Santiago, Manuel "Lolo" González, Teíque Linares, Rafael "Nenito" Deliz and Manuel de Regla "Varilla" Lugo. The team participated in the 1937 season finals, but the next three decades where characterized by poor performances during the tournaments. This changed by the end of the 1960s when a new batch of Puerto Rican players born in New York City were signed by the team.

=== The Dalmau era (1966–1985) ===
In 1966 Quebradillas signed Raymond Dalmau, who became rookie of the year in the league. In 1969 the team signed Neftali Rivera, who also became the rookie of the year. Both would go on to become legends in Puerto Rican Basketball, known as the "Dynamic Duo". Together, these two players led the team to its first team championship during the 1970 season. This incarnation of the team was coached by Eric Geldhart.

The Quebradillas Pirates were a dominant team in the BSN throughout the 1970s, reaching the league finals eight times. After their championship in 1970, they were defeated by the Vaqueros de Bayamon in 1972, 1973, and 1975, then lost to Rio Piedras Cardinals in 1976. Quebradillas won three consecutive titles in 1977–79, for a total of 4 wins in 8 finals in 10 yearse. The Quebradillas lost the championship finals in 1980, 1982, 1999, 2000, 2009 and 2011, before winning their next championship in 2013.

Rivera was traded to the Leones de Ponce following the 1981 season. However, Raymond Dalmau went on to finish his career in Quebradillas in 1985, and subsequently became a professional basketball coach.

=== Decline ===
Following the retirement of Dalmau, Quebradillas struggled to keep their presence as a dominant team in the league. With players like Orlando Vega and Jimmy Ferrer, the team managed to make several postseason runs, but they never made it to the league finals. Raymond Dalmau himself coached the team on several occasions.

During the 1988 season, Quebradillas was coached by future NBA legendary coach Phil Jackson who, at that time, had not yet found a contract with any NBA teams. After a poor season start, Quebradillas fired coach Jackson, who later went on to win 11 NBA championships with the Chicago Bulls and the Los Angeles Lakers.

=== The second Dalmau era and financial crisis ===
It would be the two sons of Raymond Dalmau which would return the Piratas to their former glory. Richie and Ricardo Dalmau led the team to two consecutive BSN finals in 1999 and 2000. However, the team lost both finals to the Cangrejeros de Santurce which were led by NBA players José Ortíz and Carlos Arroyo.

After these finals appearances, Quebradillas continued to be a competitive team, reaching the league semi-finals in several occasions. However, the team confronted financial problems at the end of the 2003 season which led the league to declare every Quebradillas player a free agent. The financial problems where mostly attributed to the fact that the team played in a small 1,500 seat arena which hindered their capabilities to obtain significant financial endorsements.

The team played during the 2004 seasons with mostly amateur players and finished the season with a league-worst 5-25 record.

=== Return to success ===
The municipality of Quebradillas committed to the construction of a new arena (to replace their former home the Pedro Hernández Coliseum) which was finalized in 2008. This new arena was named after Raymond Dalmau and it allowed the team to return to active league competition. Owner Carlos Rodríguez bought the rights to the Criollos de Caguas players and brought them to Quebradillas. Among them was current Puerto Rican National Team center Peter John Ramos. Former Connecticut Huskies star point guard Marcus Williams joined the team as well as Australian forward Shawn Redhage. Also, former Florida Gator David Huertas declined participating in his last NCAA season to join the team.

The team went on to finish with a 22-8 record, second best on the league. They advanced to the league finals for the first time since 2000 against their legendary rivals, the Vaqueros de Bayamon. Quebradillas would lose the series in 6 games. The team continued in a successive streak, reaching the finals again during the 2011 season, but lost in five games to the Capitanes de Arecibo.

=== 2012–2013 ===
In 2012, Quebradillas was bought by new owner Felix Rivera. The new ownership made a series of changes in personnel, and for the 2013 season acquired the rights to NBL stars Shawn Redhage and Kevin Lisch. On July 29, 2013, Quebradillas won (89-72) the final game of the 2013 final series in a six-game duel against Leones de Ponce. The win gave Quebradillas' its 5th championship in the team's history.

=== 2014 ===
In 2014, Felix Rivera moved the Quebradillas franchise to Manatí with the name Atenienses. Past owner Carlos Rodríguez established another team for the city and the Piratas de Quebradillas came back with a new roster. The agreement with the league was only for one year team. The 2014 Quebradillas did not qualify for the league playoffs.

=== 2015–present ===
David E. Rivera, bought the Mets of Guaynabo basketball team and transferred it to Quebradillas with the name Piratas.

In 2016, the franchise was purchased by businessman Roberto Roca.

== Current roster ==
Piratas de Quebradillas roster
Players
Coaches

Pos.	No.	Nat.	Name	Ht.	Wt.
F	23	(Puerto Rico)	Wheeler, Phillip	6 ft 8 in (2.03 m)	190 lb (86 kg)
G/F	14	(United States) (Puerto Rico)	Vaughn, Dimencio (DC)	6 ft 5 in (1.96 m)	205 lb (93 kg)
G	1	(Puerto Rico)	Santana, Reinaldo	6 ft 1 in (1.85 m)	175 lb (79 kg)
PF	0	(Puerto Rico)	Román, José	6 ft 7 in (2.01 m)	220 lb (100 kg)
PF	15	(Puerto Rico)	Reese, Derek	6 ft 7 in (2.01 m)	210 lb (95 kg)
PF		(Puerto Rico) (United States Virgin Islands)	Murphy, Jordan (DC)	6 ft 6 in (1.98 m)	250 lb (110 kg)	29 – February 28, 1997
SF		(United States) (Puerto Rico)	Morales, Anthony (DC)	6 ft 8 in (2.03 m)	195 lb (88 kg)	25 – December 19, 2000
SG		(Puerto Rico)	Huertas, David	6 ft 5 in (1.96 m)	197 lb (89 kg)	39 – June 2, 1987
SF	30	(Puerto Rico)	Emory, Carlos	6 ft 6 in (1.98 m)	205 lb (93 kg)
PG	61	(Puerto Rico)	Cruz, William	5 ft 11 in (1.80 m)	180 lb (82 kg)
PG		(Puerto Rico)	Crawford, EJ
G	24	(Puerto Rico)	Clavell, Gian	6 ft 4 in (1.93 m)	185 lb (84 kg)
G	32	(Puerto Rico)	Álvarez, Jay	6 ft 5 in (1.96 m)	190 lb (86 kg)

Head coach

- (United States) Brad Greenberg

Assistant coach(es)

- (Puerto Rico) Alexis Colón?
- (Puerto Rico) Danny Deida?

Legend

- (C) Team captain
- (DC) Dual citizenship
- (I) Import player
- Injured

- Roster
- Transactions
Updated: 5 November 2026

- Reinforcement Players Rights: (United States) Scottie James, Tai Odiase

=== Depth chart ===
Pos.	Starting 5	Bench 1	Bench 2
C			Derek Reese
PF	Phillip Wheeler		José Román
SF	Dimencio Vaughn	Carlos Emory	Gian Clavell
SG		Jay Álvarez	Reinaldo Santana
PG		William Cruz

== Notable players ==
Note: Flags indicate national team eligibility at FIBA-sanctioned events. Players may hold other non-FIBA nationalities not displayed.

Criteria

To appear in this section a player must have either:

- Set a club record or won an individual award while at the club
- Played at least one official international match for their national team at any time
- Played at least one official NBA match at any time.

- (Gabon) Chris Silva
- (Puerto Rico) Raymond Dalmau
- (Puerto Rico) Neftali Rivera
- (Puerto Rico) Orlando Vega
- (United States) - (Australia) Kevin Lisch
- (United States) - (Australia) Shawn Redhage
- (United States) - (Australia) Jeremy Tyler
- (United States) James Ennis
- (United States) Tu Holloway
- (United States) John Lucas III
- (United States) Shavlik Randolph
- (United States) Thomas Robinson
- (United States) D. J. Strawberry
- (United States) P. J. Tucker
- (United States) Marcus Williams
