= Sapientis =

Nonprofit organization based in San Juan, Puerto Rico

Sapientis, Inc.
- Founded: 2002 (24 years ago)
- Founder: Kristin Ehrgood; Vadim Nikitine
- Type: 501(c)(3) public charity
- Purpose: Improving public education in Puerto Rico
- Location: San Juan, Puerto Rico
- Region served: Puerto Rico
- Method: adaptive leadership model
- Key people: Kristin Ehrgood, President; José Armando Martínez, Executive Director
- Subsidiaries: Coalition for Equity and Educational Quality
- Endowment: $783,660 USD

Sapientis is a nonprofit organization based in San Juan, Puerto Rico, that improves public education to reduce poverty, stimulate economic growth, and enhance the standard of living in Puerto Rico.

== Context ==
With over 500,000 children and over 1,500 schools, Puerto Rico's public education system is the third largest in the United States. It also ranks at the very bottom on all indicators of academic achievement in comparison to other states and U.S. territories.

The 2008 island-wide standardized academic performance tests show that 45% of students are not proficient in Spanish, 40% are not proficient in English and 45% are not proficient in math. It also revealed that 91% of fourth grade students in Puerto Rico scored below grade level in math in comparison to their peers according to the 2004 National Assessment of Educational Progress.

== Purpose ==
Sapientis' purpose is to mobilize an island-wide network of diverse and informed change agents who exercise leadership to improve the quality of public schools for all Puerto Rican children.

== Strategy ==
Sapientis believes that the most successfully way to improve schools, all sectors of society must connect and engage, and not rest until every child in Puerto Rico has access to a quality public education system that develops students' abilities, nurtures their talents and prepares them to compete internationally. The organization also believes that when concerned citizens come together with specific ideas about improving schools, positive change can become a reality.

== Adaptive leadership ==
The organization, created by Harvard Kennedy School alumni Kristin Ehrgood and Vadim Nikitine, designs and implements programs built on a leadership model developed by renowned leadership professor Dr. Ronald Heifetz. The model incorporates elements of disciplines as diverse as philosophy, biology, political science, administration, social psychology and music. It has been developed over 20 years and has been implemented in approximately 85 countries around the globe.

Contrary to leadership models that focus on traits or characteristics of a traditional "leader" the adaptive leadership model views leadership as an action, not a person. Any individual, with or without formal authority can exercise leadership by observing, interpreting and intervening within a group or organization. Exercising leadership is a recurring activity that forces the organization or group to face its most critical challenges and mobilize its resources in order to generate progress.

Sapientis' goal over the next three years is to use this model as an essential tool to fulfill its purpose as an organization.

The name Sapientis comes from Latin and means common sense, knowledge, and wisdom, the organization's core values.

== Programs ==
Through its programs, Sapientis intends to spur change at the local level and help recruit individuals from different sectors into the network:

Schools on the Move
Over three years, Sapientis has worked with a cluster of seven schools to ensure that members of the schools' Improvement Teams (teachers, principals, parents, community members and non-teaching staff) exercise leadership to improve student achievement and their learning environments. It builds a team in each school to help it diagnose root problems, create and implement a series of interventions, evaluate progress and continue the improvement cycle. This program is being implemented in the Luis Llorens Torres public housing complex, home to over 40,000 residents in the heart of San Juan.

Youth Leadership
Sapientis recruits and trains middle and high school students in the adaptive leadership model. It also provides follow-up support to ensure student participation in their schools' Improvement Teams. Sapientis provides financial support via small grants to support leadership efforts and assist seniors in their higher education goals.

Frontline Educators
Sapientis works with teachers and school directors through a fellowship program that provides participants with a deeper understanding of the adaptive leadership model. This model is presented as a useful tool for diagnosing challenges and generating progress in student achievement and the school environment.

Get Involved
Sapientis engages concerned individuals and socially responsible corporations as supporters of its efforts to improve the quality of Puerto Rico's public education. The program provides information about Puerto Rico's public education system, Sapientis, and the adaptive leadership model, as well as opportunities to visit public schools. To raise the public's awareness of the education system, the "Get Involved" program holds an annual event, Sapientis Week, with approximately 15 distinguished individuals volunteering their time to teach a class at a public school. Participants come from the public, private, and non-profit sectors and join Sapientis in bringing attention to challenges faced by public schools as well as to the important role that teachers play in society.

Sapientis also offers ADAPTA, a leadership seminar for private companies, non-profit organizations and other groups. ADAPTA attempts to unleash Sapientis' theory of change in other spheres and fosters a better understanding of the adaptive leadership model.

== Highlights of Sapientis' work ==
Since 2002, Sapientis has raised more than $5 million from corporations, foundations, and individuals in Puerto Rico and in the US.
In December 2006, Sapientis and the Puerto Rico Department of Education signed an agreement that allows Sapientis to develop leadership programs to improve students' achievement in the island's most under-performing public schools.
To date, Sapientis has trained nearly 500 teachers, principals and education community members.
