= Leones de Ponce (basketball) =

Team in Ponce, Puerto Rico

- Nickname: "Lions"
- League: Baloncesto Superior Nacional; FIBA Americas League
- Founded: 1946
- History: Leones de Ponce (1946–2010; 2013–present)
- Arena: Auditorio Juan Pachín Vicéns
- Capacity: 11,000
- Location: Ponce, Puerto Rico
- Team colors: Red, black, white
- Head coach: Carlos Rivera
- Ownership: Gerardo Misla; Abel Misla; Oscar Misla; Ramón Misla
- Championships: 14 (1952, 1954, 1960, 1961, 1964, 1965, 1966, 1990, 1992, 1993, 2002, 2004, 2014, 2015)
- Website: www.leonesponcebsn.com
Home	Away	Alternate
Throwback

The Leones de Ponce are a professional basketball team based in Ponce, Puerto Rico, actively participating in the Baloncesto Superior Nacional league (BSN). Founded in 1946, the team has had significant success in the league, earning a total of fourteen championships. This puts them on par with the Atléticos de San Germán and just two titles short of the record held by the Vaqueros de Bayamón. Their most recent championship was won in 2015, after a final match against the Capitanes de Arecibo.

== History ==
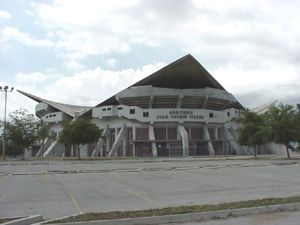
Auditorio Juan Pachín Vicéns, home venue for the team

=== The 50s and 60s ===
The Leones successes have always been periodical: their first championship came in 1952, 22 years after the beginning of BSN tournaments. They repeated as champions in 1954, but the 1953 championship did not finish when players from Ponce and San German were involved in a brawl which BSN officials could not control. The Leones did not win any more championships until 1960. The 1960s were a glorious decade for the Leones, who repeated in 1961 and then won three peat titles in 1964, 1965 and 1966. The presence of guard Juan "Pachín" Vicens greatly helped the Leones to reach the success they had. He was the key player in an already great roster. His impact can be evidenced by the fact that the Lions venue is named after him. Tex Winter, an assistant coach with the NBA Chicago Bulls championship teams of the 1990s, coached the Leones to their two 1950s titles, while Red Holzman was the main architect of the titles won from '64 to '66.

=== The 80s ===
The Leones could not win a championship for 24 years after the 1966 title. In 1984 they reached rock bottom when it was discovered that they had proceeded against the BSN's rules to sign David Ponce. Ponce was an American born Puerto Rican, and he had not spent the three years in Puerto Rico that are necessary for a BSN player to be nationalized, therefore, he was not eligible to play in the league. When this was discovered, a league wide scandal broke out, and the league determined to close the tournament that year by carrying out the Copa Olímpica championship instead of the normal championship finals. The Leones were excluded from participating in the Copa Olímpica. Also, for two years during this decade (1983 and 1984) the Leones line-up featured Puerto Rican superstar Angel Santiago (who would return to the Leones for six games in 1995).

=== The 1990s ===
The Leones started rebuilding, acquiring such players as José "Papote" Agosto, Charlie Lanauze, Cesar Bocachica, Francisco "Papiro" León, Julian Rodriguez and their star player, Toñito Colón. With these players, the Leones, contended for the 1989 title, losing in seven games to Mario "Quijote" Morales and the Guaynabo Mets. With the acquisition of veteran Bobby Ríos in 1990, however, the Leones formed one of the most feared roster line-ups in the league. The four key players (Agosto, Lanauze, Colón, and Ríos) were known as the "Four Horsemen of the Apocalypse" in local media for their sharpshooting accuracy. They returned to the finals along with Julian Rodriguez and beat Guaynabo in a rematch. In 1992, coached by Julio Toro, the Leones returned to the throne, beating the Capitanes de Arecibo for the title. A rubber match with Mario Morales and his Mets was played at the 1993 finals, and the Leones prevailed, beating the Mets four games to one. They also reached the finals in 1995, 1996, and 1998.

=== The 21st century ===
After 1993, Ponce took nine more years to win a title. With the acquisition of Eddie Casiano and Bobby Joe Hatton in 2001, the team started re-building around them, with remaining key veteran players like Toñito Colón. In 2002, they beat the Vaqueros for the title in seven games. In 2003, the Leones signed former Vaqueros player Jerome Mincy, but they could not repeat as champions despite reaching the finals again. In 2004, in a series marred by controversy (Ponce almost threatened to pull out of game six during the fourth quarter), the Leones won their twelfth championship, defeating the Coamo Marathon Runners in seven games, with a game seven score of 92-77. They dedicated the championship to the city mayor, Rafael Cordero, who died in January of that year.

=== Hiatus (2011–2012) ===
Due to financial difficulties the team did not participate in the 2011–12 season.

=== The Return ===
On November 2, 2012 an agreement was reached for the sale where Dr. Oscar Santiago acquired the franchise. Under his guidance the team did extremely well after hiring fellow ponceño Nelson Colón as coach from the San Germán Athletics and signing forward Mike Harris and guard Mike Rosario. By the end of the 2013 season, the Lions reached the finals against the Quebradillas Pirates but after a six-game series they failed to win a championship trophy.

=== A New Era ===
In 2014 the Lions made their second consecutive finals appearance. This time they defeated the Arecibo Captains in 6 games to achieve their thirteenth championship and the first title in a decade. A year later, the team returned in a rematch of the 2014 finals against the Capitanes. The Lions made their back-to-back title after six games and tied the BSN record, along with the Bayamón Cowboys and the San Germán Athletics, for most overall championships.

== International competition ==
=== 2014 FIBA Americas League ===
Leones de Ponce made its international debut in the 2014 edition of the FIBA Americas League as one of the two teams representing the BSN, accepting an invitation to participate as the runner-up of the league that year. The team was included in Group B, which was hosted by Montevideo. Hindered by the fact that the BSN was off-season (being a summer league, in contrast to the other leagues in the hemisphere) and players abroad, this version of the team relied on local players, particularly a core of inexperienced young players (SF Carlos Emory, PF Chris Gaston and SG Mike Rosario) that was complemented by several veterans that were past their prime (SF/PF Gabriel Colón, PG Guayito Santiago and SG/SF Rick Apodaca), but also included Eric Griffin (PF), Weyinmi Efejuku (G) and Walter Sharpe (PF) as reinforcements.

In their debut, Leones faced Unitri/Uberlândia of the Novo Basquete Brasil, losing 81-85. The team recovered by defeating Club Atlético Lanús, runner-up of the Liga Nacional de Básquet, with scores of 90-73 on their second game. Leones entered the final date of the opening round with possibilities to eliminate Unitri/Uberlândia and advance, but lost to Club Atlético Aguada (third place at the Liga Uruguaya de Basketball, who were also serving as the host of the group and playing in their home court) after Leandro García Morales scored a two-point buzzer-beater for the final score of 92-93.

=== 2017 FIBA Americas League ===
Leones de Ponce made its return to the FIBA Americas League in the 2017 edition as a measure to develop team chemistry prior to the BSN season, hosting the opening round of Group D at Auditorio Juan Pachín Vicéns. The team combined the regular roster signing of PG Andrés Torres with reinforcements Carlos Arroyo (PG), Filiberto Rivera (PG), Hakim Warrick (PF/C) and Eric Dawson (PF/C), but lost SF Carlos Emory prior to the tournament due to injury. Due to being the only team in the pool not active in a season, exhibition games were held against teams including the Group C Capitanes de Arecibo. Ponce debuted by defeating Academia de la Montaña of Colombia, 76-61. The team then advanced to the following round with a win over Cocodrilos de Caracas, 88-84. Prior to the final game of the group phase the team lost its regular SG Víctor Liz due to a calf injury, going on to lose against Weber Bahía Blanca in overtime, 92-96.

The home team games during the group phase averaged an assistance of 5,000 fans, which satisfied FIBA and led to a request to organize the following round. After securing the role of host for Semifinal F, the team added PF Devon Collier, who joined the now-recovered Liz and Emory. Capitanes de Arecibo served once again as an exhibition opponent on February 27, 2017. In the first game of the semifinal, Ponce defeated Weber Bahía Blanca in a rematch, 95-82. The following night, they lost to Hebraica y Macabi (67-80), causing a four-way tie in the pool. Despite resting regular SF Ángel Daniel Vassallo most of the game due to a knee injury, Ponce defeated San Lorenzo de Almagro with scores of 115-107 (following two overtimes) in the semifinal closer to advance to the final four.

While Barquisimeto in Venezuela became the host of the next stage, the players where given time to recover while the staff scouted the other teams. The team held an exhibition against the Cariduros de Fajardo, before leaving to fulfill the practice sessions scheduled upon their arrival to the South American country. Prior to the round, the team lost Vassallo for the remainder of the tournament with knee complications. Ponce finished this edition in the third place of the grand final, losing to eventual champion and home team Guaros de Lara (87-100) in the pivotal match before rebounding to win the consolation game over Mexico's Fuerza Regia (90-68). After leading the tournament in assists per game, Arroyo was selected as the point guard of the Ideal Team.

=== 2018 FIBA Americas League ===
After a sponsor supported them, the Leones choose to participate in the 2018 FIBA Americas League despite having limited facilities (due to the passing of hurricane Maria in September 2017) and several roster losses that forced them to rely on nostalgia and bring former members for the tournament. Mike Rosario, Chris Gastón and Miguel Alí Berdiel headlined this makeshift group, which lost Arroyo, Filiberto Rivera and Liz from the previous edition. The team concluded with a record of 1-2, leaving the competition after the conclusion of the first round. Playing abroad at Argentina, Ponce lost to local teams Estudiantes Concordia (66-81) and Regatas Corrientes (76-90), while defeating Hebraica Macabi of Uruguay (86-69).

=== 2019 FIBA Americas League ===
In November 2018, Leones de Ponce requested participation in the 2019 FIBA Americas League. The following month they were confirmed as members of Group D, along Capitanes de Arecibo, Guaros de Lara and Libertadores de Querétaro. On December 17, 2018, Ponce was confirmed as the host of the group's first round. On Christmas Day, Leones revealed that Arroyo had been signed, while the team made moves to have regular season roster players available (including Vassallo and Liz) and signed Adrian Uter (PF/C), Nick Minnerath (PF/C) and Dane Johnson (PF/C) as reinforcements for the tournament. Efejuku was initially only brought back for the tournament, but later joined the roster as a regular after being nativized (following four years of continued residence) and acquired by Ponce in the 2019 BSN Draft.

== Home arena ==
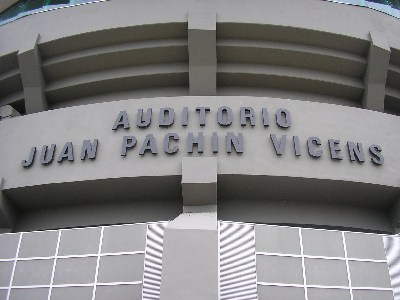
Main entrance.

The team's home court is Juan Pachín Vicéns Auditorium, named after the Ponce basketball legend who won several titles with the Leones and was even declared to be the Best Player of the World during the 1959 FIBA World Championship in Chile. The auditorium opened on May 12, 1972. Initially it had a maximum capacity of 7,786 but numerous remodelations have increased this to exceed 8,000.

== Championships ==
Following are the titles won by the Ponce Leones basketball team.

Ponce professional sports teams
Club	Sport	League	Venue	League Championships
Leones de Ponce	Basketball	Baloncesto Superior Nacional	Juan Pachín Vicéns Auditorium	BSN Championships (14): 1952 – defeated Cangrejeros de Santurce, series 4-?; 1954 – defeated Atléticos de San Germán, series 4-?; 1960 – defeated Cardenales de Río Piedras, series 4-?; 1961 – defeated Capitanes de Arecibo, series 4-3; 1964 – defeated Cangrejeros de Santurce, series 4-?; 1965 – defeated Atléticos de San Germán, series 4-?; 1966 – defeated Capitanes de Arecibo, series 4-3; 1990 – defeated Mets de Guaynabo, series 4-1; 1992 – defeated Capitanes de Arecibo, series 4-2; 1993 – defeated Mets de Guaynabo, series 4-1; 2002 – defeated Vaqueros de Bayamón, series 4-3; 2004 – defeated Maratonistas de Coamo, series 4-3; 2014 – defeated Capitanes de Arecibo, series 4-2; 2015 – defeated Capitanes de Arecibo, series 4-2

== Players ==
=== Current roster ===
Note: Flags indicate national team eligibility at FIBA-sanctioned events. Players may hold other non-FIBA nationalities not displayed.

Leones de Ponce roster
Players
Coaches

Pos.	No.	Nat.	Name	Ht.	Wt.	Age
G	0	(Puerto Rico)	De Jesús, Jezreel	6 ft 1 in (1.85 m)	180 lb (82 kg)	35 – May 5, 1991
G/F	1	(Puerto Rico)	Vasquez, Alejandro	6 ft 4 in (1.93 m)	200 lb (91 kg)	25 – October 21, 2000
G/F	2	(United States) (Puerto Rico)	Powell, Bryan (DC)	6 ft 7 in (2.01 m)	210 lb (95 kg)	26 – July 4, 2000
F	12	(United States) (Puerto Rico)	Ford, Aleem (DC)	6 ft 8 in (2.03 m)	220 lb (100 kg)	28 – December 22, 1997
G	17	(Puerto Rico)	Figueroa, Omar	6 ft 0 in (1.83 m)	170 lb (77 kg)	23 – November 9, 2002
PG	20	(United States)	Crutcher, Jalen (I)	6 ft 1 in (1.85 m)	175 lb (79 kg)	27 – July 18, 1999
G	21	(Puerto Rico)	Santos, Kenneth	6 ft 1 in (1.85 m)	190 lb (86 kg)	28 – April 23, 1998
F/C	22	(Puerto Rico)	Negrón, Christian	6 ft 8 in (2.03 m)	225 lb (102 kg)	27 – November 24, 1998
PG	25	(Puerto Rico)	Fernández, Tjader	5 ft 10 in (1.78 m)	175 lb (79 kg)	32 – 28 January 1994
PG	30	(Puerto Rico)	Walker, Johned	5 ft 11 in (1.80 m)	173 lb (78 kg)	23 – May 20, 2003
PF	34	(Puerto Rico) (United States Virgin Islands)	Murphy, Jordan (DC)	6 ft 6 in (1.98 m)	250 lb (110 kg)	29 – February 28, 1997
C	36	(United States) (Lebanon)	Robinson, Thomas (I)	6 ft 10 in (2.08 m)	240 lb (110 kg)	35 – March 17, 1991
PF	45	(United States)	Manek, Brady (I)	6 ft 9 in (2.06 m)	230 lb (100 kg)	27 – September 4, 1998
C	51	(Cuba)	Ramos, Enrique	6 ft 9 in (2.06 m)	225 lb (102 kg)	36 – September 14, 1989
G/F	77	(Puerto Rico)	Lezcano, Janpier	6 ft 2 in (1.88 m)	180 lb (82 kg)	23 – March 20, 2003

Head coach

- (Puerto Rico) Carlos Rivera

Assistant coach(es)

- (Puerto Rico) Javier Antonio “Toñito” Colón
- (Puerto Rico) Sammy Pacheco

Legend

- (C) Team captain
- (DC) Dual citizenship
- (I) Import player
- Injured

- Roster
Updated: 30 June 2026

Pos.	Starting 5	Bench 1	Bench 2
C	Thomas Robinson	Christian Negrón	Enrique Ramos
PF	Brady Manek	Jordan Murphy	Bryan Powell
SF	Aleem Ford	Alejandro Vasquez	Janpier Lezcano
SG	Jezreel De Jesús	Johned Walker	Kenneth Santos
PG	Jalen Crutcher	Tjader Fernández	Omar Figueroa

== See also ==
- Leones de Ponce (baseball)
- Leonas de Ponce
