= Capitanes de Arecibo =

Puerto Rican basketball team

- Nickname: "Captains"
- League: BSN
- Founded: 1930
- History: Lobos del Norte (1930–1934); Capitanes de Arecibo (1946–present); Capitanes de Puerto Rico (2010)
- Arena: Coliseo Manuel Petaca Iguina
- Capacity: 12,000
- Location: Arecibo, Puerto Rico
- Team colors: Yellow, black
- Team manager: Gaby Miranda
- Head coach: Juan Cardona
- Ownership: José Manuel Baeza
- Championships: 8 BSN Championships (1959, 2005, 2008, 2010, 2011, 2016, 2018, 2021)
- Website: capitanesdearecibo.net
Home	Away	Third

The Capitanes de Arecibo are a Puerto Rican professional basketball team based in Arecibo that competes in the Baloncesto Superior Nacional (BSN) league. In 2010, the team also had the distinction to play in the Premier Basketball League (PBL) under the name Capitanes de Puerto Rico. The team began play in the league in 1946. Home games are held at Manuel Iguina Coliseum, which the team shares with the Capitanes de Arecibo men's volleyball team.

The team has won eight BSN Championships (1959, 2005, 2008, 2010, 2011, 2016, 2018 and 2021) and has had a total 17 finals appearances, being a runner-up 9 times (1932, 1946, 1948, 1961, 1966, 1992, 2007, 2012, 2014, 2015, 2017). Capitanes is the only team to participate in all editions of the FIBA Americas League, having entered the final four twice (finishing 2nd in 2010 and 3rd in 2013).

== History ==
=== Early years ===
In 1946, coached by Wilfredo Franco, Tingo Díaz, Piro Méndez and for a pre-Olympic tournament, the Capitanes emerged. A group of young athletes, mostly from Arecibo, like: Manuel Gilberto (Petaca) Iguina, Quicón Iguina, Abdiel de la Rosa, Alberto Renta, Joaquín Balaguer, Armando Villamil, y Pipe Beníquez showed themselves to be a part of it and dominated the sport in Puerto Rico, finishing in second place.

On August 19, 1959, the Capitanes won their first basketball championship against the Rio Piedras Cardinals at the Rodríguez Olmo Stadium in Arecibo. They were coached by Lou Rossinni, and the heroes of that series were Jaime Frontera, Francisco Pancho Padilla, Felipito Colón, Bill MacCadney, José (Fufi) Santori Coll, Moisés Navedo, José Rodríguez Gómez, Eddie Martínez, José Vázquez, José Aponte, Angel Morales, Jaime Miranda, Joe Phillip Padilla hijo, Ramón Siraguza, Enrique Miranda, and Sitín García. This team is the only team in BSN history to have gone the entire season, including the playoffs, undefeated.

In 1992, coached by Alfred “Butch” Lee, the Capitanes returned to the BSN Finals with elite players Ferdinand Morales, Rafael Hernandez, Giovanni Colón, Fitz Roy Brow, Juan Griles, Orlando Febres, Bryan and Mark Santiago, losing a hard-fought series against the Ponce Lions.

=== Restructuring ===
The Capitanes in 2002 wrote another page in the history of their city and the BSN when the so-called "kids" broke the predictions of the media and basketball analysts by taking a semi-final series to Game 7 with young talents Giovanni Jiménez, Rick Apodaca, Buster Figueroa, Pachy Cruz and David Cortes; and veterans Félix Javier Perez, Javier Rolón and Oscar Chiaramello.

In 2005, general manager Regino Babilonia hired Carlos Mario Rivera as head coach and the Captains again won the BSN Championship (4-0) over the Bayamón Cowboys.

In 2007, with David Rosario at the command of the Captain Ship, and the fiery players Rafael “Pachy” Cruz, Ángel “Buster” Figueroa, David Cortes, Carlos Payano and Marcus Fizer as reinforcement, the Capitanes returned to the BSN Finals. In a historic, sold-out Game 7 at the Jose Miguel Agrelot Coliseum, where 75% of the attendees were from Captain Correa City, the Arecibo Captains came back from a 20-point fourth-quarter deficit to force an overtime. In a hard-fought and emotional series of plays and calls, the Captains came up just short of another championship.

During the 2008 season, the Capitanes advanced again to the finals against the Carolina Giants. The series went to seven games, with both teams winning three games at home. Arecibo won the seventh game, 99-94, for the third championship in the franchise's history. Ángel Figueroa was selected the Finals' Most Valuable Player.

=== 2005 Championship ===
It was forty-six years since the Captains succeeded in that first championship. That was on August 19, 1959. They came short in 1966 when they lost in overtime against Ponce and in a seventh game finals held at the court of Manuel Carrasquillo Herpen Country Club. In 1992 the attorney Hiram Ruiz saw the Lions come from behind in the series to thwart another major celebration in Arecibo.

In 2005, there were doubts. However, unlike the team of 1959, the 2005 edition played with many ups and downs during the regular season and also in the "round robin", for example beating the best in the league but losing to last-placed teams. The reason for not dominating as expected was the failure of the team's "Refuerzo" (reinforcement player), former rebounding leader and prolific scorer, center Nick Davis, who did not meet the team and fan's expectations, as well as his following replacements until the arrival of Richard Lugo.

In the "round robin" the Captains won five and lost as many games. The team was torn between changing Dickey Simpkins or staying with the player that looked more like a fifth man with the added reinforcement that was hurt.

With all that were chosen as a finalist in the analyzes that the Cowboys favored above all others for having excelled in the second stage of the tournament. Unlike the 1959 champion who went undefeated, these Captains had to earn their stripes.

The Captains got a breaks with the elimination of Ponce. The Lions were the best team that could match-up with the Captains and successfully handle the full-court press.

The Captains then faced a remodeled Santurce, with former Nigerian NBA player Olumide Oyedeji. The series became complicated and unpredictable.

It was then that Edgar Padilla appeared on the scene.

Bayamón could not run with Arecibo and Flor Melendez knew that he could control the tempo of the game in the first two games of this final series. Both were very close games. Despite these woes, the Vaquero fans hoped Bayamon would come back. This was dispelled as soon as Richard Lugo was able to play for the Captains in game three.

After the Cowboys rallied to win game four and force a fifth game, the Captains closed out the series in game five. Larry Ayuso scored 40 points on offense and played defense well in that closing game.

=== 2008 Championship ===
On June 28, 2008, Capitanes de Arecibo defeated Gigantes de Carolina in 7 games to win their third championship, Angel Luis Figueroa scored 33 points and Roberto Jose Hatton scored 20 points. Ángel Figueroa was selected the Finals' Most Valuable Player.

=== 2010 Championship ===
The reconquest of the National Superior Basketball League Championship is a fact. The Arecibo Capitanes are the new Champions of the BSN. The national title was achieved Saturday, July 3, 2010, at the Rubén Rodríguez Coliseum in Bayamón at night. Incidentally, the Capitanes became the first team in the history of the BSN, to win a seventh and deciding game as the visiting team. The final score of the game it was 73 - 62. The match had to be stopped and subsequently confiscated, because the team's fans of Bayamón, began throwing objects onto the court and the game could not be terminated. We the game was stopped, there was still 1:42 on the clock, but Arecibo had absolute control of the game. It is noteworthy that this is the second Championship won by the Capitanes in the past three tournaments of the BSN.

At the beginning of the meeting the atmosphere was worthy of a seventh game. Donta smith immediately began the annotations for Bayamón, but Larry Ayuso did not remain with folded arms. In the first five minutes of action, Ayuso had already made three triples. Then, when the clock struck 4:48, Danilo Pinncok managed a basket that gave them the first lead in the game 13 - 12. After this move Bayamón managed to take advantage on the board 19 - 17. All this so that in the next moves, Guillermo Díaz scoring three free throws and Danny Santiago make a dunk that brought the Capitanes to dominate the first quarter 22 - 19.

The start of the second period for Arecibo was very explosive. The Capitanes opened with a push of 7-0, thanks to a triple by Larry Ayuso and two consecutive baskets by Danilo Pinnock. At that time, Arecibo took off on the scoreboard 29 - 19. Incidentally, those were the first points of a rally that did Danilo Pinnock. He scored eight consecutive points for Arecibo. The Vaqueros tried to answer with some baskets of Christian Dalmau and Robert Traylor, but the Capitanes managed to close strong at the half. After twenty minutes of action the Capitanes had twelve-point advantage, 43 - 31. During that first half, Larry Ayuso and Danilo Pinnock combined to make between them, thirty-three points. Captains also dominated the rebounds 20 - 11. Also they were perfect from the free throw line.

The second half began with an offensive push for the Vaqueros. They managed six points, but Guillermo Díaz was able to answer with triple when subtracted 7:53 on the clock. To this, Danilo Pinncok added two free throws, but Bayamón answered with a triple by Christian Dalmau. On the next play, Danny Santiago make a triple with 4:45 detracted. Then, Bayamón answered with five straight points, but Danilo Pinncok score four straight points and David Cortés scored two points to keep Arecibo in front. When subtract only 45 seconds of the period, Larry Ayuso achieved another triple. Arecibo closed the quarter 62 - 50 for Arecibo.

The fourth quarter began with an exchange of baskets by both, but the Capitanes knew how to answer on every possession. Larry Ayuso achieved another triple with 7:32 left and the score was 68–57 at the time. Plays later, Carmelo Lee scored a field goal by Bayamón, but this was answered immediately by the Capitanes. David Cortés managed a shot and Danny Santiago make another. In this way Arecibo was leading 72 - 60, while still detracted 3:45 left in the game. Bayamón managed to score three extra points, before they culminate the event. This was so because on the last play of the game, Danny Santiago achieved an impressive steal. After the steal, Andrés Rodríguez gets the ball and he received a hard foul that led him to the free throw line. Before Andrés Rodríguez could make his attempts, the fans from Bayamón began a relentless rain of objects and this forced the League officials to confiscate the game in Arecibo's favor. At that time, there is still 1:42 to play, but the game was largely dominated by Arecibo 73 - 62. Thus, the Arecibo Capitanes won their fourth championship of the BSN (1959, 2005, 2008 and 2010).

The best scorers for the team Bayamón were: Christian Dalmau with 22 points and Carmelo Lee with 11. While for Arecibo, four players were in double figures. The best it was, Larry Ayuso with 23 points. By the way, Ayuso was declared the MVP of the Final Series. Then followed by: Danilo Pinnock who scored 21 points, Daniel Santiago with 11 points and Guillermo Diaz, who had 11 points, 10 rebounds and five assists.

=== 2011 Repeating as Champions ===
On August 1, 2011 Capitanes de Arecibo defeated Piratas de Quebradillas in 5 games (4-1) to win their fifth National Superior Basketball Championship. Guillermo Díaz was chosen as the Most Valuable Player.¡El Back to Back es un hecho!

The Back to Back is a fact! The Arecibo Captains succeeded for the first time in its history the feat of winning two consecutive championships in the National Superior Basketball League. Turn became the first team to achieve in the decade. He managed the Arecibo was reached on Monday, August 1, 2011 at the Coliseo Manuel "Flask" Iguina Arecibo, when the captains were able to defeat the Pirates of Quebradillas 79 74. For the Arecibo Championship fifth national title means (1959, 2005, 2008, 2010 and 2011) and in turn is its fifth finals in seven years. The Championship game was witnessed by over 12,000 fans.

For the second time during the Final Series, the Captains came out strong in the offensive side of the court. Consecutive triples Larry Ayuso and David Cortes took off immediately to Arecibo on the scoreboard. To make matters worse, Danilo Pinnock prescribed another triple and this allowed Arecibo took off 13 by 6. Quebradillas did not remain with arms folded and responded with two straight triples David Huertas. These triples came to the Pirates 13 by 12. Seconds later, the Captains got their second run offensive night, being at this time a 9-0. After the first ten minutes of action, Arecibo was ahead on the scoreboard 24 by 18.

In the second part, hostilities have stabilized a bit. Arecibo and Quebradillas engaged in an exchange of baskets and this allowed the Pirates will mount in the notes field. Just when Quebradillas had approached 35 by 30, Arecibo reacted with a "rally" 7-0 and went away again. Despite this, the Pirates scored four goals in line and was in this way ended the first half. The score at that time favored by 42 Captains 34. Seconds before, Puruco Latimer, had to leave the party injured left shoulder.

In the second half of the offensive game was rather slow for both quintets. Arecibo was the first to wake up with two triples and a field goal from Larry Ayuso. After that, Quebradillas answered with a push of 6-0. At that moment the game was 50 by 42 and was just as PJ Tucker received a technical foul. Both free throws were converted the technical foul for Larry Ayuso. Later, Peter John Ramos scored six points for the Pirates string and these were answered by seven consecutive Danny Santiago of Arecibo. After this exchange, both quintets baskets managed to finish the third set. The score reflected a clear advantage for the Captains of 62 by 52.

The last ten minutes of action began with five goals of the Captains, but the Pirates were able to respond with their offense. Quebradillas was a "rally" of 8-0 and approached 66 to 60 on the scoreboard. In those moments when it seemed that resurface Quebradillas, the figure of Guillermo Diaz. He was lord and master of the show and made two free throws and hit a triple that sentenced the Pirates to defeat. Quebradillas failed to rise and so the clock expired, giving the Captains its fifth national title. The game ended with a score of 79 by 74.

Top scorers for the Quebradillas team were: David Huertas with 26 and Peter John Ramos with 23. While on the Champions, as they were featured: Larry Ayuso with 22 and Danilo Pinnock had 18 points and 9 rebounds. Meanwhile, Guillermo Diaz scored 14 points and had the honor of being selected by the members of the press as the MVP of the Final Series

Capitanes de Arecibo win 2 straight Championships (2010, 2011) and their fourth championship in 7 years.

== Current players ==
=== Current roster ===
Note: Flags indicate national team eligibility at FIBA-sanctioned events. Players may hold other non-FIBA nationalities not displayed.

Capitanes de Arecibo roster
Players
Coaches

Pos.	No.	Nat.	Name	Ht.	Wt.	Age
G	1	(Puerto Rico)	González, Diego	6 ft 1 in (1.85 m)	190 lb (86 kg)	25 – 2 August 2001
PF	8	(Puerto Rico)	Rivera Jr., Felix	6 ft 9 in (2.06 m)	230 lb (100 kg)	29 – 1 February 1997
G	9	(Puerto Rico)	Plummer, Alfonso	6 ft 1 in (1.85 m)	180 lb (82 kg)	29 – 4 September 1997
C	10	(Puerto Rico)	Díaz, Jorge	6 ft 11 in (2.11 m)	250 lb (110 kg)	36 – 13 November 1989
SG	12	(Puerto Rico)	Reyes, Justin	6 ft 4 in (1.93 m)	190 lb (86 kg)	31 – 16 March 1995
SG	16	(United States) (Puerto Rico)	Zhao Olmos, Jonathan (DC)	6 ft 4 in (1.93 m)	180 lb (82 kg)	23 – 9 July 2003
F	22	(Puerto Rico)	Meléndez, RJ	6 ft 7 in (2.01 m)	200 lb (91 kg)	23 – 3 December 2002
G/F	24	(Puerto Rico)	Pinzón, Rafael	6 ft 6 in (1.98 m)	195 lb (88 kg)	24 – 8 November 2002
G	41	(Puerto Rico)	Rosado, Daniel	6 ft 4 in (1.93 m)	180 lb (82 kg)	22 – 22 May 2004
PG		(United States Virgin Islands) (Puerto Rico)	Hodge, Walter (DC)	5 ft 11 in (1.80 m)	170 lb (77 kg)	40 – September 21, 1986
SG		(Puerto Rico)	Muñiz, Jevin Nikolas	6 ft 6 in (1.98 m)	190 lb (86 kg)	23 – January 8, 2003
PG		(United States) (Puerto Rico)	Smith, Malachi (DC)

Head coach

- (Puerto Rico) Juan Cardona

Assistant coach(es)

- (Puerto Rico) Allans Colon
- (Puerto Rico) Tony Ruiz
- (Puerto Rico) Mandy Cancel

Legend

- (C) Team captain
- (DC) Dual citizenship
- (I) Import player
- Injured

- Roster
Updated: 8 November 2026

Pos.	Starting 5	Bench 1	Bench 2
C	Tim Soares	Jorge Díaz	Matt López
PF	Rashard Kelly	Emmanuel Andújar	Felix Rivera Jr.
SF	RJ Meléndez	Rafael Pinzón	Justin Reyes
SG	Alfonso Plummer	Juan Pablo Piñeiro	Jonathan Zhao Olmos
PG	Derrick Walton	Diego González	Daniel Rosado

== Premier Basketball League (2010) ==
The PBL began its third season in 2010 with nine teams. The Capitanes were one of three expansion teams. For PBL play, the Capitanes take the name of Puerto Rico rather than their home city. The Capitanes established two different talent pools. As well as the original BSN team, they had a roster for PBL play that included selections in that league's player draft. Their subsequent first signings were Andrés Rodríguez and Bonzi Wells. Other international players signed by the Capitanes during the off-season were Elías Larry Ayuso, Angelo Reyes and Walter Hodge. Antonio Látimer and José Rosario completed the signings, while Hodge left during the season to join the Cangrejeros. Their performance earned the team constant inclusion in MLN Sports' basketball rankings, debuting in the fourth spot. During the undefeated streak, David Rosario was named PBL Coach of the Month for January.

The team won its first series against the Maryland GreenHawks, with scores of 109:100 and 99:91. The Capitanes subsequently won their first contests against the Manchester Millrats (116:104) and Vermont Frost Heaves (114:103), establishing a lead in the league's standings. The Capitanes' next game was against the team that held the second place in the standing, the Lawton-Fort Sill Cavalry (3-0), winning with scores of 101:94. The team won its first contests against the Buffalo Stampede (114:89), Halifax Rainmen (108:101) and Quebec Kebs (93:86). After two weeks of inactivity, the Capitanes began a series of away games defeating the GreenHawks 111:93. On March 21, 2010 the game between the Rainmen from Halifax and the Capitanes was played after the game had been canceled due to bad weather the previous time it had been scheduled. The score was 106:94, Capitanes.

=== Expulsion from the PBL ===
In March 2010, the PBL announced that it was forced to expel the franchise due to an alleged failure to adhere to its rules & guidelines. Among the violations cited were, failing to appear at road games, failure to pay amount owed to the league, and lack of communication with league officers. At the moment, the team held the second best record in the league and had secured a spot in the playoffs.

The Capitanes responded by hiring one of Puerto Rico's top litigation attorneys, Lee Sepulvado of the law firm Sepulvado & Maldonado. The team's lawyers filed a complaint seeking a temporary restraining order and a preliminary injunction before federal court in Puerto Rico. The PBL hired O'Neill & Borges, one of Puerto Rico's top law firms and was represented by attorney Salvador Antonetti Stutts whom attended Harvard Law School and is a former Solicitor General of the Commonwealth of Puerto Rico.

After the attorneys conducted oral arguments before Federal Judge Juan Perez Gimenez the court entered a temporary restraining order against the PBL instructing the league to immediately reinstate the Capitanes and allow them to participate in the 2010 playoffs. Shortly thereafter the PBL agreed to the issuance of a preliminary injunction order formally reinstating the team.

The matter received extensive media coverage and the PBL was forced to accept its wrongdoing by setting aside the expulsion of the team. The Capitanes vehemently denied the charges and all along insisted their only goal was to win in the basketball court and not the legal court.

== International performance ==
=== 2007 FIBA Americas League ===
As runners-up of the 2007 BSN season, the Capitanes were selected to represent Puerto Rico in the first edition of the FIBA Americas League, along with the BSN-champion Santurce Crabbers. Before the competition began, the Capitanes' coach, David Rosario, stated that the team's preparation was intense so that they would be able to adapt in order to match the advantage expected to be presented by Fuerza Regia and Halcones Xalapa, since the tournament occurred in the middle of the Liga Nacional de Baloncesto Profesional season.

== Trophies and awards ==
=== Domestic ===
- BSN Championship:
  - Winner (8): 1959, 2005, 2008, 2010, 2011, 2016, 2018, 2021
  - Runner-up (11): 1932, 1946, 1948, 1961, 1966, 1992, 2007, 2012, 2014, 2015,2017
- Copa Supermercados Hatillo Kash & Karry:
  - Winner (6): 2009, 2010, 2011, 2012, 2014, 2015
- Copa Iván ‘Cano’ Jirau:
  - Winner (1): 2018

=== International ===
- FIBA Americas League:
  - Runner-up (1): 2010–2011.

=== Championship head coaches ===
- Lou Rossini: 1959
- Carlos Mario Rivera: 2005
- David Rosario: 2008, 2010, 2011
- Rafael Cruz: 2016, 2018, 2021

== Notable players ==
- (Puerto Rico) Elias "Larry" Ayuso (No. 10)
- (Puerto Rico) Guillermo Diaz (No. 1)
- (Nigeria) Chinemelu Elonu
- (Puerto Rico) Angel "Buster" Figueroa (No. 33)
- (Puerto Rico) Walter Hodge (No. 15)
- (Puerto Rico) David Huertas (No. 33)
- (Puerto Rico) Fufi Santori
- (Panama) Rolando Frazer
- (United States) Renaldo Balkman (No. 32)
- (United States) (Israel) D'or Fischer
- (United States) Marcus Fizer (No. 23)
- (United States) Tony Massenburg
- (United States) D. J. Strawberry
- (United States) Bonzi Wells

== Head coaches ==
- (United States) Lou Rossini
- (Puerto Rico) Carlos Mario Rivera
- (Puerto Rico) David Rosario
- (Puerto Rico) Rafael Cruz
