= List of 2025–26 NBA season transactions =

This is a list of transactions that have taken place during the 2025 NBA off-season and the 2025–26 NBA season.

== Retirement ==
Date	Name	Team(s) played (years)	Age	Notes	Ref.
June 26	Miloš Teodosić	Los Angeles Clippers (2017–2019)	38	Also played abroad	
June 29	Bojan Bogdanović	Brooklyn Nets (2014–2017); Washington Wizards (2017); Indiana Pacers (2017–2019); Utah Jazz (2019–2022); Detroit Pistons (2022–2024); New York Knicks (2024)	36	Also played abroad	
July 22	Álex Abrines	Oklahoma City Thunder (2016–2019)	31	Also played abroad	
August 18	Marco Belinelli	Golden State Warriors (2007–2009); Toronto Raptors (2009–2010); New Orleans Hornets (2010–2012); Chicago Bulls (2012–2013); San Antonio Spurs (2013–2015; 2018–2020); Sacramento Kings (2015–2016); Charlotte Hornets (2016–2017); Atlanta Hawks (2017–2018); Philadelphia 76ers (2018)	39	NBA champion (2014); Also played abroad	
August 19	John Wall	Washington Wizards (2010–2020); Houston Rockets (2020–2022); Los Angeles Clippers (2022–2023)	34	All-NBA Third Team (2017); NBA All-Defensive Second Team (2015); NBA All-Rookie First Team (2011); 5× NBA All-Star (2014–2018)	
August 30	Jeremy Lin	Golden State Warriors (2010–2011); New York Knicks (2011–2012); Houston Rockets (2012–2014); Los Angeles Lakers (2014–2015); Charlotte Hornets (2015–2016); Brooklyn Nets (2016–2018); Atlanta Hawks (2018–2019); Toronto Raptors (2019)	37	NBA champion (2019); Also played abroad	
October 8	Carlos Delfino	Detroit Pistons (2004–2007); Toronto Raptors (2007–2008); Milwaukee Bucks (2009–2012); Houston Rockets (2012–2013)	43	Also played abroad	
October 15	Malcolm Brogdon	Milwaukee Bucks (2016–2019); Indiana Pacers (2019–2022); Boston Celtics (2022–2023); Portland Trail Blazers (2023–2024); Washington Wizards (2024–2025)	32	NBA Sixth Man of the Year (2023); NBA Rookie of the Year (2017); NBA All-Rookie First Team (2017)	
October 20	Shabazz Napier	Miami Heat (2014–2015); Orlando Magic (2015–2016); Portland Trail Blazers (2016–2018); Brooklyn Nets (2018–2019); Minnesota Timberwolves (2019–2020); Washington Wizards (2020)	34	Also played in the NBA D-League/G League and abroad Hired as a coaching apprentice by the Washington Wizards	
October 23	Keita Bates-Diop	Minnesota Timberwolves (2018–2020); Denver Nuggets (2020); San Antonio Spurs (2020–2023); Phoenix Suns (2023–2024); Brooklyn Nets (2024)	29	Also played in the NBA G League and abroad Hired as an assistant coach by the Sioux Falls Skyforce	
December 2	Danilo Gallinari	New York Knicks (2008–2011); Denver Nuggets (2011–2017); Los Angeles Clippers (2017–2019); Oklahoma City Thunder (2019–2020); Atlanta Hawks (2020–2022); Washington Wizards (2023–2024); Detroit Pistons (2024); Milwaukee Bucks (2024)	37	Also played abroad	
February 13	Chris Paul	New Orleans Hornets (2005–2011); Los Angeles Clippers (2011–2017); Houston Rockets (2017–2019); Oklahoma City Thunder (2019–2020); Phoenix Suns (2020–2023); Golden State Warriors (2023–2024); San Antonio Spurs (2024–2025); Los Angeles Clippers (2025–2026)	40	4× All-NBA First Team (2008, 2012–2014); 5× All-NBA Second Team (2009, 2015, 2016, 2020, 2021); 2× All-NBA Third Team (2011, 2022); 7× NBA All-Defensive First Team (2009, 2012–2017); 2× NBA All-Defensive Second Team (2008, 2011); NBA Rookie of the Year (2006); NBA All-Rookie First Team (2006); 12× NBA All-Star (2008–2016, 2020–2022); NBA All-Star Game MVP (2013); 5× NBA assists leader (2008, 2009, 2014, 2015, 2022); 6× NBA steals leader (2008, 2009, 2011–2014); NBA 75th Anniversary Team	
March 12	Dwight Howard	Orlando Magic (2004–2012); Los Angeles Lakers (2012–2013); Houston Rockets (2013–2016); Atlanta Hawks (2016–2017); Charlotte Hornets (2017–2018); Washington Wizards (2018–2019); Los Angeles Lakers (2019–2020); Philadelphia 76ers (2020–2021); Los Angeles Lakers (2021–2022)	40	NBA champion (2020); 5× All-NBA First Team (2008–2012); All-NBA Second Team (2014); 2× All-NBA Third Team (2007, 2013); 3× NBA Defensive Player of the Year (2009–2011); 4× NBA All-Defensive First Team (2009–2012); NBA All-Defensive Second Team (2008); NBA All-Rookie First Team (2005); 8× NBA All-Star (2007–2014); NBA Slam Dunk Contest champion (2008); 5× NBA rebounding leader (2008–2010, 2012, 2013); 2× NBA blocks leader (2009, 2010); Also played abroad	
May 7	P. J. Tucker	Toronto Raptors (2006–2007); Phoenix Suns (2012–2017); Toronto Raptors (2017); Houston Rockets (2017–2021); Milwaukee Bucks (2021); Miami Heat (2021–2022); Philadelphia 76ers (2022–2023); Los Angeles Clippers (2023–2025); New York Knicks (2025)	41	NBA champion (2021); Also played abroad	
May 12	Damion Lee	Atlanta Hawks (2018); Golden State Warriors (2018–2022); Phoenix Suns (2022–2025)	33	NBA champion (2022); Also played in the NBA D-League/G League abroad	

== Front office movements ==
=== Head coaching changes ===
Off-season

Departure date	Team	Outgoing head coach	Reason for departure	Hire date	Incoming head coach	Last coaching position	Ref.
April 14	Phoenix Suns	Mike Budenholzer	Fired	June 4	Jordan Ott	Cleveland Cavaliers assistant coach (2024–2025)	
May 2	San Antonio Spurs	Gregg Popovich	Stepped down	May 2	Mitch Johnson	San Antonio Spurs assistant coach (2019–2024)	
June 3	New York Knicks	Tom Thibodeau	Fired	July 7	Mike Brown	Sacramento Kings head coach (2022–2024)	

=== General manager changes ===
Off-season

Departure date	Team	Outgoing general manager	Reason for departure	Hire date	Incoming general manager	Last managerial position	Ref.
April 17	Sacramento Kings	Monte McNair	Mutually agreed to part ways	April 21	Scott Perry	New York Knicks general manager (2017–2023)	
April 21	Atlanta Hawks	Landry Fields	Fired	April 21	Onsi Saleh	Atlanta Hawks assistant general manager (2024)	
May 1	Phoenix Suns	James Jones	Stepped down	May 1	Brian Gregory	Phoenix Suns vice president of player programming (2024)	

== Player movements ==
=== Trades ===
June
June 15	To Memphis Grizzlies: Cole Anthony; Kentavious Caldwell-Pope; 2025 ORL first-round pick (No. 16); 2026 first-round pick (Note: Before this trade Washington had the right to swap its pick (if No. 1–8) for Phoenix's; then Orlando had the right to swap its pick for whatever Phoenix has; then Memphis had the right to swap its pick for whatever Phoenix had. This trade would let Memphis trade either its own pick or Orlando's for whatever Phoenix has after Washington's swap right, as well as keeping the other pick for itself.); 2028 ORL first-round pick; 2029 ORL protected first-round pick swap right (Note: Memphis may swap for the pick if No. 3–30.); 2030 ORL first-round pick	To Orlando Magic: Desmond Bane	
June 17	To Indiana Pacers: 2026 IND first-round pick (Note: Indiana traded this pick away in a January 2024 transaction with Toronto, which then traded it to New Orleans in February 2025.)	To New Orleans Pelicans: 2025 IND first-round pick (No. 23); Draft rights to Mojave King (2023 No. 47)	
June 25 (draft-day)	To Atlanta Hawks: Draft rights to Asa Newell (No. 23); 2026 first-round pick (Note: The more favorable of the picks originally belonging to Milwaukee and New Orleans.)	To New Orleans Pelicans: Draft rights to Derik Queen (No. 13)	
June 25 (draft-day)	To Memphis Grizzlies: Draft rights to Cedric Coward (No. 11)	To Portland Trail Blazers: Draft rights to Yang Hansen (No. 16); 2027 ATL second-round pick; 2028 ORL first-round pick; 2028 SAC second-round pick	
June 25 (draft-day)	To Oklahoma City Thunder: 2027 SAS protected first-round pick (Note: Oklahoma City will receive the pick if No. 17–30, otherwise they receive two 2027 second-round picks.)	To Sacramento Kings: Draft rights to Nique Clifford (No. 24)	
June 25 (draft-day)	To Utah Jazz: Draft rights to Walter Clayton Jr. (No. 18)	To Washington Wizards: Draft rights to Will Riley (No. 21); 2025 UTA second-round pick (No. 43); 2031 second-round pick; 2032 UTA second-round pick	
June 26 (draft-day)	To Boston Celtics: Draft rights to Max Shulga (No. 57); Draft rights to Amari Williams (No. 46); 2026 second-round pick (Note: The most favorable of the picks originally belonging to Detroit, Milwaukee, and Orlando.); 2027 second-round pick (Note: The most favorable of the picks originally belonging to Boston and Orlando. Boston traded its pick to Orlando in a previous trade, making this effectively a swap right.)	To Orlando Magic: Draft rights to Noah Penda (No. 32)	
June 26 (draft-day)	To Los Angeles Clippers: Draft rights to Kobe Sanders (No. 50)	To New York Knicks: Draft rights to Mohamed Diawara (No. 51); Draft rights to Luka Mitrović (2015 No. 60)	
June 28	To Oklahoma City Thunder: Colby Jones	To Washington Wizards: Dillon Jones; 2029 HOU second-round pick	
June 29	To Charlotte Hornets: Collin Sexton; 2030 second-round pick (Note: The more favorable of the picks originally belonging to Los Angeles Clippers and Utah.)	To Utah Jazz: Jusuf Nurkić	
June 30	To Charlotte Hornets: Vasilije Micić; Draft rights to Liam McNeeley (No. 29); 2029 first-round pick (Note: The least favorable of the picks originally belonging to Cleveland, Minnesota (if No. 6–30), and Utah.)	To Phoenix Suns: Mark Williams; 2029 PHX second-round pick (Note: Phoenix traded this pick away in an earlier transaction.)	
July
July 1	To Chicago Bulls: Draft rights to Lachlan Olbrich (No. 55); Cash considerations	To Los Angeles Lakers: Draft rights to Rocco Zikarsky (Note: LA Lakers flipped Zikarsky's rights to Minnesota in a separate trade.) (No. 45)	
July 6	To Atlanta Hawks: Nickeil Alexander-Walker (sign-and-trade)	To Minnesota Timberwolves: 2027 CLE second-round pick; Cash considerations	
July 6	To Charlotte Hornets: Pat Connaughton; 2031 MIL second-round pick; 2032 MIL second-round pick	To Milwaukee Bucks: Vasilije Micić	
July 6	To Chicago Bulls: Isaac Okoro	To Cleveland Cavaliers: Lonzo Ball	
July 6	To Golden State Warriors: Draft rights to Will Richard (No. 56)	To Memphis Grizzlies: Draft rights to Justinian Jessup (2020 No. 51); Draft rights to Jahmai Mashack (No. 59); 2032 GSW protected second-round pick (Note: Memphis will receive the pick if No. 51–60.)	
July 6	To Indiana Pacers: Jay Huff	To Memphis Grizzlies: 2029 POR second-round pick; 2031 second-round pick swap right (Note: Memphis may swap its own pick for the less favorable of the picks originally belonging to Indiana and Miami.)	
July 6	To Indiana Pacers: Draft rights to Kam Jones (No. 38)	To San Antonio Spurs: 2030 SAC second-round pick; Cash considerations	
July 6	Three-team trade		
July 6	To Houston Rockets: 2026 CHI second-round pick (from Washington); 2029 SAC second-round pick (from Washington); Draft rights to Mojave King (2023 No. 47) (from New Orleans)	To New Orleans Pelicans: Saddiq Bey (from Washington); Jordan Poole (from Washington); Draft rights to Micah Peavy (No. 40) (from Washington)	
July 6	To Washington Wizards: CJ McCollum (from New Orleans); Kelly Olynyk (from New Orleans); Cam Whitmore (from Houston); 2027 CHI second-round pick (Note: This pick was previously split, with Washington receiving it if No. 31–50 and New Orleans receiving it if No. 51–60; Washington will now receive the pick regardless of its position.) (New Orleans)		
July 6	Seven-team trade		
July 6	To Atlanta Hawks: David Roddy (two-way contract) (from Houston); 2031 second-round pick swap right (Note: Atlanta may swap their own pick for Houston's pick.) (from Houston); Cash considerations (from Houston)	To Brooklyn Nets: 2026 second-round pick (Note: The second-most favorable of the picks originally belonging to Boston, Indiana, Los Angeles Clippers, and Miami.) (from Houston); 2030 BOS second-round pick (from Houston)	
July 6	To Golden State Warriors: Draft rights to Jahmai Mashack (Note: Golden State flipped Mashack's rights to Memphis in a separate trade.) (No. 59) (from Houston); Draft rights to Alex Toohey (No. 52) (from Phoenix)	To Houston Rockets: Clint Capela (sign-and-trade) (from Atlanta); Kevin Durant (from Phoenix)	
July 6	To Los Angeles Lakers: Draft rights to Adou Thiero (No. 36) (from Brooklyn)	To Minnesota Timberwolves: Draft rights to Rocco Zikarsky (No. 45) (from Los Angeles); 2026 second-round pick (Note: The less favorable of the picks originally belonging to Denver and Golden State.) (from Phoenix); 2032 second-round pick (Note: The less favorable of the picks originally belonging to Houston and Phoenix.) (from Houston); Cash considerations (from Los Angeles)	
July 6	To Phoenix Suns: Dillon Brooks (from Houston); Jalen Green (from Houston); Daeqwon Plowden (two-way contract) (from Atlanta); Draft rights to Koby Brea (No. 41) (from Golden State); Draft rights to Rasheer Fleming (No. 31) (from Minnesota); Draft rights to Khaman Maluach (No. 10) (from Houston); 2026 second-round pick (Note: The second-most favorable of the picks originally belonging to Dallas, Oklahoma City, and Philadelphia.) (from Houston)		
July 7	To Boston Celtics: Anfernee Simons	To Portland Trail Blazers: Jrue Holiday	
July 7	To Detroit Pistons: Duncan Robinson (sign-and-trade)	To Miami Heat: Simone Fontecchio	
July 7	To Detroit Pistons: 2026 CHA protected second-round pick (Note: Detroit will receive the pick if No. 56–60.)	To Sacramento Kings: Dennis Schröder (sign-and-trade); 2029 second-round pick (Note: The least favorable of the picks originally belonging to Detroit, Milwaukee, and New York.)	
July 7	Three-team trade		
July 7	To Atlanta Hawks: Kristaps Porziņģis (from Boston); 2026 second-round pick (Note: Memphis has the right to swap the more favorable of the picks originally belonging to Indiana and Miami for Boston's own pick; Boston also owns the most favorable of the picks originally belonging to Minnesota, New Orleans, New York, and Portland. Atlanta will receive the less favorable of the two picks Boston holds after Memphis exercises or declines its swap right.) (from Boston)	To Boston Celtics: Georges Niang (from Atlanta); 2031 CLE second-round pick (from Atlanta); Cash considerations (from Brooklyn)	
July 7	To Brooklyn Nets: Terance Mann (from Atlanta); Draft rights to Drake Powell (No. 22) (from Atlanta)		
July 7	Three-team trade		
July 7	To Los Angeles Clippers: John Collins (from Utah)	To Miami Heat: Norman Powell (from Los Angeles)	
July 7	To Utah Jazz: Kyle Anderson (from Miami); Kevin Love (from Miami); 2027 LAC second-round pick (from Los Angeles)		
July 8	To Brooklyn Nets: Michael Porter Jr.; 2032 DEN first-round pick	To Denver Nuggets: Cameron Johnson	
July 9	To San Antonio Spurs: Kelly Olynyk	To Washington Wizards: Malaki Branham; Blake Wesley; 2026 second-round pick (Note: The least favorable of the picks originally belonging to Dallas, Oklahoma City, and Philadelphia.)	
July 13	To Denver Nuggets: Jonas Valančiūnas	To Sacramento Kings: Dario Šarić	
August
August 6	To Boston Celtics: RJ Luis Jr. (two-way contract)	To Utah Jazz: Georges Niang; 2027 second-round pick (Note: The more favorable of the picks originally belonging to Boston and Orlando.); 2031 second-round pick (Note: The more favorable of the picks originally belonging to Boston and Cleveland.)	
August 15	To Brooklyn Nets: Haywood Highsmith; 2032 MIA second-round pick	To Miami Heat: 2026 BKN protected second-round pick (Note: Miami will receive the pick if No. 56–60.)	
September
September 16	To Atlanta Hawks: Cash considerations	To Brooklyn Nets: Kobe Bufkin	
January
January 9	To Atlanta Hawks: CJ McCollum; Corey Kispert	To Washington Wizards: Trae Young	
February
February 1	To Atlanta Hawks: Duop Reath; 2027 ATL second-round pick (Note: Atlanta traded this away in a previous transaction.); 2030 NYK second-round pick	To Portland Trail Blazers: Vít Krejčí	
February 1	Three-team trade		
February 1	To Chicago Bulls: Dario Šarić (from Sacramento); 2027 DEN second-round pick (from Cleveland); 2029 SAC second-round pick (Note: The least favorable of the picks originally belonging to Detroit, Milwaukee, and New York.) (from Sacramento)	To Cleveland Cavaliers: Keon Ellis (from Sacramento); Emanuel Miller (from Chicago); Dennis Schröder (from Sacramento)	
February 1	To Sacramento Kings: De'Andre Hunter (from Cleveland)		
February 3	To Memphis Grizzlies: Kyle Anderson; Walter Clayton Jr.; Taylor Hendricks; Georges Niang; 2027 LAL protected first-round pick (Note: Memphis will receive the pick if it's No. 5–30.); 2027 first-round pick (Note: The most favorable of the picks originally belonging to Cleveland, Minnesota, and Utah.); 2031 PHX first-round pick	To Utah Jazz: Jaren Jackson Jr.; John Konchar; Jock Landale; Vince Williams Jr.	
February 3	Three-team trade		
February 3	To Chicago Bulls: Mike Conley Jr. (from Minnesota); Jaden Ivey (from Detroit)	To Detroit Pistons: Kevin Huerter (from Chicago); Dario Šarić (from Chicago); 2026 MIN protected first-round swap right (Note: Detroit can swap picks if Minnesota's pick is No. 20–30.) (from Minnesota)	
February 3	To Minnesota Timberwolves: Cash considerations (Note: None of the teams' press releases state who Minnesota received the cash considerations from.)		
February 4	To Charlotte Hornets: Mike Conley Jr.; Coby White	To Chicago Bulls: Ousmane Dieng (Note: Oklahoma City traded Dieng to Charlotte, which then flipped him to Chicago. This was originally reported to be a three-team trade but was made official as two separate trades.); Collin Sexton; ~~2029 second-round pick~~ (Note: The less favorable of the picks originally belonging to Charlotte and Denver. Initially included in the trade, this pick was removed after White's physical found a calf injury requiring him to miss some time.); 2031 NYK second-round pick; 2031 DEN second-round pick	Amended; Feb. 6
February 4	To Charlotte Hornets: Ousmane Dieng; 2029 second-round pick (Note: The more favorable of the picks originally belonging to Atlanta and Miami.)	To Oklahoma City Thunder: Mason Plumlee	
February 4	To Charlotte Hornets: Tyus Jones; 2027 second-round pick (Note: The less favorable of the picks originally belonging to Boston and Orlando.); 2028 ORL second-round pick	To Orlando Magic: Cash considerations	
February 4	To Cleveland Cavaliers: James Harden	To Los Angeles Clippers: Darius Garland; 2026 CLE second-round pick	
February 4	To Oklahoma City Thunder: Jared McCain	To Philadelphia 76ers: 2026 HOU first-round pick; 2027 second-round pick (Note: The most favorable of the picks originally belonging to Houston, Indiana, Miami, and Oklahoma City.); 2028 MIL second-round pick; 2028 OKC second-round pick	
February 4	To Oklahoma City Thunder: Draft rights to Balša Koprivica (2021 No. 57)	To Utah Jazz: Cash considerations	
February 5	To Atlanta Hawks: Buddy Hield; Jonathan Kuminga	To Golden State Warriors: Kristaps Porziņģis	
February 5	To Atlanta Hawks: Gabe Vincent; 2032 LAL second-round pick	To Los Angeles Lakers: Luke Kennard	
February 5	To Atlanta Hawks: Jock Landale	To Utah Jazz: Cash considerations	
February 5	To Boston Celtics: Cash considerations	To Brooklyn Nets: Josh Minott	
February 5	To Boston Celtics: 2030 CHA second-round pick (Note: Boston will receive the pick if No. 56–60.)	To Charlotte Hornets: Xavier Tillman Sr.; Cash considerations	
February 5	To Boston Celtics: Nikola Vučević; 2027 DEN second-round pick	To Chicago Bulls: Anfernee Simons; 2026 second-round pick (Note: The most favorable of the picks originally belonging to Minnesota, New Orleans, New York, and Portland.)	
February 5	To Boston Celtics: John Tonje (two-way contract)	To Utah Jazz: Chris Boucher; 2027 DEN second-round pick; Cash considerations	
February 5	To Brooklyn Nets: Hunter Tyson; 2032 second-round pick	To Denver Nuggets: 2026 second-round pick (Note: The less favorable of the picks originally belonging to Atlanta and the Los Angeles Clippers.)	
February 5	To Chicago Bulls: Rob Dillingham; Leonard Miller; 2026 second-round pick (Note: The less favorable of the picks originally belonging to Denver and Golden State.); 2027 CLE second-round pick; 2031 second-round pick (Note: The more favorable of the picks originally belonging to Golden State and Minnesota.); 2032 second-round pick (Note: The more favorable of the picks originally belonging to Houston and Phoenix.)	To Minnesota Timberwolves: Ayo Dosunmu; Julian Phillips	
February 5	To Chicago Bulls: Guerschon Yabusele; Cash considerations	To New York Knicks: Dalen Terry	
February 5	To Cleveland Cavaliers: Cash considerations	To Utah Jazz: Lonzo Ball; 2028 CLE second-round pick; 2032 CLE second-round pick	
February 5	To Golden State Warriors: 2026 LAL second-round pick	To Toronto Raptors: Trayce Jackson-Davis	
February 5	To Indiana Pacers: Kobe Brown; Ivica Zubac	To Los Angeles Clippers: Isaiah Jackson; Bennedict Mathurin; 2026 first-round draft pick (Note: Los Angeles will receive the pick if No. 5–9. If the pick does not convey, they will receive Indiana's 2031 first-round pick.); 2028 DAL second-round pick; 2029 IND first-round pick	
February 5	To Memphis Grizzlies: Eric Gordon; 2032 second-round pick swap right	To Philadelphia 76ers: Draft rights to Justinian Jessup (2020 No. 51)	
February 5	To New Orleans Pelicans: Dalen Terry; 2026 second-round pick; 2027 second-round pick; Cash considerations	To New York Knicks: Jose Alvarado; Draft rights to Latavious Williams (2010 No. 48)	
February 5	Three-team trade		
February 5	To Brooklyn Nets: Ochai Agbaji (from Toronto); 2032 TOR second-round pick (from Toronto); Cash considerations (from Los Angeles)	To Los Angeles Clippers: Draft rights to Vanja Marinković (2019 No. 60) (from Brooklyn)	
February 5	To Toronto Raptors: Chris Paul (from Los Angeles)		
February 5	Three-team trade		
February 5	To Charlotte Hornets: Malaki Branham (from Washington)	To Dallas Mavericks: Marvin Bagley III (from Washington); AJ Johnson (from Washington); Tyus Jones (from Charlotte); Khris Middleton (from Washington); 2026 first-round pick (Note: The least favorable of the picks originally belonging to Houston, the Los Angeles Clippers, and Oklahoma City; Houston's pick is protected and only available if No. 5–30.) (from Washington); 2026 PHX second-round pick (from Washington); 2027 CHI second-round pick (from Washington); 2029 HOU second-round pick (from Washington); 2030 GSW protected first-round pick (Note: Dallas will receive the pick if it's No. 21–30.) (from Washington)	
February 5	To Washington Wizards: Anthony Davis (from Dallas); Danté Exum (from Dallas); Jaden Hardy (from Dallas); D'Angelo Russell (from Dallas)		
February 5	Three-team trade		
February 5	To Chicago Bulls: Nick Richards (from Phoenix)	To Milwaukee Bucks: Ousmane Dieng (from Chicago); Nigel Hayes-Davis (from Phoenix)	
February 5	To Phoenix Suns: Cole Anthony (from Milwaukee); Amir Coffey (from Milwaukee)		

=== Free agents ===
The NBA's free agency period began on June 30 at 6 p.m. EST.

Players were allowed to sign new offers starting on July 6 at 12 p.m. ET, after the moratorium ended.

^{R}	Denotes unsigned players whose free-agent rights were renounced
^{T}	Denotes sign-and-trade players
^{C}	Denotes player who is claimed off waivers (same contract, different team)
	Denotes signed player who failed to make opening-day roster
	Denotes player whose deal was later turned into a two-way contract
	Denotes player signed to 10-day contract
	Denotes restricted free agent whose offer sheet was matched by his old team

Player	Date signed	New team	Former team	Ref
Eric Gordon*	July 1	Philadelphia 76ers		
Garrett Temple	July 1	Toronto Raptors		
Collin Gillespie (RFA)	July 2	Phoenix Suns (Previously on a two-way contract)		
Trendon Watford	July 2	Philadelphia 76ers	Brooklyn Nets	
Sandro Mamukelashvili	July 3	Toronto Raptors	San Antonio Spurs	
Jae'Sean Tate	July 5	Houston Rockets		
Nickeil Alexander-Walker ^{T}	July 6	Atlanta Hawks	Minnesota Timberwolves	
Deandre Ayton	July 6	Los Angeles Lakers	Portland Trail Blazers (Waived on June 29)	
Nicolas Batum	July 6	Los Angeles Clippers		
Clint Capela ^{T}	July 6	Houston Rockets	Atlanta Hawks	
Justin Edwards** (RFA)	July 6	Philadelphia 76ers		
Dorian Finney-Smith	July 6	Houston Rockets	Los Angeles Lakers	
Caleb Grill	July 6	Chicago Bulls	Missouri Tigers (Undrafted in 2025)	
James Harden	July 6	Los Angeles Clippers		
Jaxson Hayes	July 6	Los Angeles Lakers		
Joe Ingles	July 6	Minnesota Timberwolves		
Kyrie Irving	July 6	Dallas Mavericks		
Tre Jones	July 6	Chicago Bulls		
Tyus Jones	July 6	Orlando Magic	Phoenix Suns	
Jake LaRavia	July 6	Los Angeles Lakers	Sacramento Kings	
Brook Lopez	July 6	Los Angeles Clippers	Milwaukee Bucks	
Sam Merrill	July 6	Cleveland Cavaliers		
Ajay Mitchell (RFA)	July 6	Oklahoma City Thunder		
Larry Nance Jr.	July 6	Cleveland Cavaliers	Atlanta Hawks	
Wooga Poplar	July 6	Chicago Bulls	Miami Hurricanes (Undrafted in 2025)	
Bobby Portis	July 6	Milwaukee Bucks		
D'Angelo Russell	July 6	Dallas Mavericks	Brooklyn Nets	
Myles Turner	July 6	Milwaukee Bucks	Indiana Pacers	
Fred VanVleet	July 6	Houston Rockets		
Guerschon Yabusele	July 6	New York Knicks	Philadelphia 76ers	
Jordan Clarkson	July 7	New York Knicks	Utah Jazz (Waived on July 1)	
Luka Garza	July 7	Boston Celtics	Minnesota Timberwolves	
Luke Kornet	July 7	San Antonio Spurs	Boston Celtics	
Caris LeVert	July 7	Detroit Pistons	Atlanta Hawks	
Kevon Looney	July 7	New Orleans Pelicans	Golden State Warriors	
Kyle Lowry	July 7	Philadelphia 76ers		
Josh Minott	July 7	Boston Celtics	Minnesota Timberwolves	
Davion Mitchell (RFA)	July 7	Miami Heat		
Kevin Porter Jr.*	July 7	Milwaukee Bucks		
Paul Reed	July 7	Detroit Pistons		
Duncan Robinson ^{T}	July 7	Detroit Pistons	Miami Heat	
Dennis Schröder ^{T}	July 7	Sacramento Kings	Detroit Pistons	
Gary Trent Jr.	July 7	Milwaukee Bucks		
Moritz Wagner	July 7	Orlando Magic		
James Wiseman	July 7	Indiana Pacers	Toronto Raptors (Waived on February 6)	
Moussa Cissé	July 8	Dallas Mavericks	Memphis Tigers (Undrafted in 2025)	
Matthew Cleveland	July 8	Dallas Mavericks	Florida State Seminoles (Undrafted in 2025)	
Drew Eubanks	July 8	Sacramento Kings	Los Angeles Clippers (Waived on July 1)	
Gary Harris	July 8	Milwaukee Bucks	Orlando Magic	
Aaron Holiday	July 8	Houston Rockets		
Luke Kennard	July 8	Atlanta Hawks	Memphis Grizzlies	
Igor Miličić Jr.	July 8	Philadelphia 76ers	Tennessee Volunteers (Undrafted in 2025)	
Taurean Prince	July 8	Milwaukee Bucks		
Ryan Rollins	July 8	Milwaukee Bucks		
Bruce Brown	July 9	Denver Nuggets	New Orleans Pelicans	
Jeff Green	July 9	Houston Rockets		
Nigel Hayes-Davis	July 9	Phoenix Suns	Fenerbahçe (Turkey)	
Jericho Sims	July 9	Milwaukee Bucks		
Marvin Bagley III	July 10	Washington Wizards	Memphis Grizzlies	
Tim Hardaway Jr.	July 10	Denver Nuggets	Detroit Pistons	
David Roddy	July 10	Toronto Raptors	Atlanta Hawks (Waived on July 6)	
Isaiah Jackson (RFA)	July 11	Indiana Pacers		
Cameron Matthews	July 12	Houston Rockets	Mississippi State Bulldogs (Undrafted in 2025)	
Jordan McLaughlin	July 12	San Antonio Spurs		
Spencer Dinwiddie	July 13	Charlotte Hornets	Dallas Mavericks	
Tre Mann	July 13	Charlotte Hornets		
Mason Plumlee	July 13	Charlotte Hornets	Phoenix Suns	
Ty Jerome	July 14	Memphis Grizzlies	Cleveland Cavaliers	
Cam Spencer (RFA)	July 14	Memphis Grizzlies (Previously on a two-way contract)		
Naz Reid	July 14	Minnesota Timberwolves		
Santi Aldama (RFA)	July 15	Memphis Grizzlies		
Jock Landale	July 15	Memphis Grizzlies	Houston Rockets (Waived on July 3)	
Julius Randle	July 15	Minnesota Timberwolves		
Cole Anthony	July 16	Milwaukee Bucks	Memphis Grizzlies (Waived on July 12)	
Chris Livingston	July 16	Milwaukee Bucks		
Bradley Beal	July 18	Los Angeles Clippers	Phoenix Suns (Waived on July 16)	
Damian Lillard	July 19	Portland Trail Blazers	Milwaukee Bucks (Waived on July 7)	
Hayden Gray	July 20	Boston Celtics	UC San Diego Tritons (Undrafted in 2025)	
Chris Paul	July 21	Los Angeles Clippers	San Antonio Spurs	
Blake Wesley	July 21	Portland Trail Blazers	Washington Wizards (Waived on July 19)	
Josh Okogie	July 22	Houston Rockets	Charlotte Hornets (Waived on July 15)	
Marcus Smart	July 22	Los Angeles Lakers	Washington Wizards (Waived on July 20)	
Jordan Goodwin ^{C}	July 23	Phoenix Suns	Los Angeles Lakers (Waived on July 20)	
Jared Butler	July 24	Phoenix Suns	Philadelphia 76ers	
Lindy Waters III	July 24	San Antonio Spurs	Detroit Pistons	
R. J. Davis	July 25	Los Angeles Lakers	North Carolina Tar Heels (Undrafted in 2025)	
Eric Dixon	July 25	Los Angeles Lakers	Villanova Wildcats (Undrafted in 2025)	
Arthur Kaluma	July 25	Los Angeles Lakers	Texas Longhorns (Undrafted in 2025)	
Augustas Marčiulionis	July 26	Los Angeles Lakers	Saint Mary's Gaels (Undrafted in 2025)	
Doug McDermott	July 29	Sacramento Kings		
Malevy Leons	July 30	Oklahoma City Thunder	Oklahoma City Blue (NBA G League)	
Jaden Springer	July 31	New Orleans Pelicans	Utah Jazz (Waived on July 24)	
Olivier Sarr	August 1	Toronto Raptors	Oklahoma City Thunder	
Micah Potter	August 6	San Antonio Spurs	Utah Jazz (Previously on a two-way contract)	
Patrick Baldwin Jr.	August 7	Los Angeles Clippers (Waived on July 28)		
Anthony Gill	August 7	Washington Wizards (Previously waived on June 29)		
TyTy Washington Jr.	August 7	Los Angeles Clippers	Phoenix Suns (Previously on a two-way contract)	
Adam Flagler	August 8	San Antonio Spurs	Oklahoma City Thunder (Previously on a two-way contract)	
Chris Boucher	August 10	Boston Celtics	Toronto Raptors	
Kessler Edwards	August 11	Denver Nuggets	Dallas Mavericks (Previously on a two-way contract)	
Jason Preston	August 11	Los Angeles Clippers	Utah Jazz (Previously waived on November 24)	
Ethan Thompson	August 13	Miami Heat	Orlando Magic (Waived on July 22)	
Javonte Green	August 14	Detroit Pistons	Cleveland Cavaliers	
Dru Smith (RFA)	August 16	Miami Heat (Previously on a two-way contract)		
N'Faly Dante (RFA)	August 18	Atlanta Hawks	Houston Rockets (Previously on a two-way contract)	
Amir Coffey	August 19	Milwaukee Bucks	Los Angeles Clippers	
Caleb Houstan	August 19	Atlanta Hawks	Orlando Magic	
Colin Castleton	August 22	Orlando Magic	Toronto Raptors (Waived on July 28)	
Kylor Kelley	August 25	Los Angeles Lakers	Pallacanestro Trieste (Italy)	
Danté Exum	August 30	Dallas Mavericks		
Thanasis Antetokounmpo	August 31	Milwaukee Bucks		
Reece Beekman	September 2	Orlando Magic	Brooklyn Nets (Previously on a two-way contract)	
Garrison Brooks	September 2	New Orleans Pelicans	BC Wolves (Lithuania)	
Jalen McDaniels	September 2	New Orleans Pelicans	Capital City Go-Go (NBA G League)	
Justin Minaya	September 2	Orlando Magic	Portland Trail Blazers (Previously on a two-way contract)	
Lester Quiñones	September 2	Orlando Magic	New Orleans Pelicans (Waived on July 24)	
Stanley Umude	September 2	San Antonio Spurs	Milwaukee Bucks	
Javan Johnson	September 3	Atlanta Hawks	Santa Cruz Warriors (NBA G League)	
Dwight Murray Jr.	September 3	Atlanta Hawks	College Park Skyhawks (NBA G League)	
Day'Ron Sharpe	September 3	Brooklyn Nets		
Alex Schumacher	September 4	Phoenix Suns	Valley Suns (NBA G League)	
Cam Thomas (RFA)	September 4	Brooklyn Nets		
Tyler Burton	September 6	Memphis Grizzlies	Memphis Hustle (NBA G League)	
Lawson Lovering	September 6	Memphis Grizzlies	Utah (Undrafted in 2025)	
Mouhamadou Gueye	September 8	Chicago Bulls	Capital City Go-Go (NBA G League)	
Jaden Shackelford	September 8	Phoenix Suns	Valley Suns (NBA G League)	
Ziaire Williams	September 8	Brooklyn Nets		
Zach Freemantle	September 9	Los Angeles Clippers	Xavier Musketeers (Undrafted in 2025)	
Quincy Guerrier	September 9	Toronto Raptors	Montreal Alliance (Canada)	
Jalen Slawson	September 9	Indiana Pacers	Osceola Magic (NBA G League)	
Charles Bassey	September 10	Atlanta Hawks	San Antonio Spurs	
Tyreke Key	September 10	Toronto Raptors	Raptors 905 (NBA G League)	
Osayi Osifo	September 10	San Antonio Spurs	Calgary Surge (Canada)	
Cormac Ryan	September 10	Milwaukee Bucks	Oklahoma City Blue (NBA G League)	
Dain Dainja	September 11	Miami Heat	Memphis (Undrafted in 2025)	
Kobe Johnson	September 11	Atlanta Hawks	UCLA Bruins (Undrafted in 2025)	
Jarkel Joiner	September 11	Toronto Raptors	College Park Skyhawks (NBA G League)	
Trevor Keels	September 11	Miami Heat	Iowa Wolves (NBA G League)	
Gabe Madsen	September 11	Miami Heat	Utah (Undrafted in 2025)	
Jahmir Young	September 11	Miami Heat	Chicago Bulls (Waived on July 19)	
Moses Brown	September 12	Denver Nuggets	Westchester Knicks (NBA G League)	
Isaiah Miller	September 13	San Antonio Spurs	Austin Spurs (NBA G League)	
Bismack Biyombo	September 15	San Antonio Spurs		
Malcolm Brogdon	September 15	New York Knicks	Washington Wizards	
Bones Hyland	September 15	Minnesota Timberwolves (Previously on a two-way contract)		
Johnny Juzang	September 15	Minnesota Timberwolves	Utah Jazz (Waived on June 30)	
Alex Len	September 15	New York Knicks	Los Angeles Lakers	
Garrison Mathews	September 15	New York Knicks	Atlanta Hawks	
Jalon Moore	September 15	New Orleans Pelicans	Oklahoma (Undrafted in 2025)	
David Muoka	September 15	Brooklyn Nets	Windy City Bulls (NBA G League)	
Dink Pate	September 15	New York Knicks	Mexico City Capitanes (NBA G League undrafted in 2025)	
Matt Ryan	September 15	New York Knicks	New York Knicks (Waived on March 2)	
Landry Shamet	September 15	New York Knicks	New York Knicks	
Bryson Warren	September 15	New York Knicks	Sioux Falls Skyforce (NBA G League)	
Johnny O'Neil	September 16	New Orleans Pelicans	Santa Clara (Undrafted in 2025)	
Keyontae Johnson	September 18	Charlotte Hornets	Greensboro Swarm (NBA G League)	
Brandon Slater	September 19	Charlotte Hornets	Lavrio Megabolt (Greece)	
Marcus Garrett	September 20	Charlotte Hornets		
Emoni Bates	September 22	Philadelphia 76ers	Cleveland Cavaliers (Previously on a two-way contract)	
Kennedy Chandler	September 22	Philadelphia 76ers	Raptors 905 (NBA G League)	
Steven Crowl	September 22	Utah Jazz	Wisconsin (Undrafted in 2025)	
Malcolm Hill	September 22	Philadelphia 76ers	New Orleans Pelicans (Waived on October 21, 2024)	
Jaylen Martin	September 22	Philadelphia 76ers	Washington Wizards (Waived on August 4)	
Matthew Murrell	September 22	Utah Jazz	Mississippi (Undrafted in 2025)	
DJ Rodman	September 22	Charlotte Hornets	Maine Celtics (NBA G League)	
Fanbo Zeng	September 22	Brooklyn Nets	Beijing Shougang (China)	
Damion Baugh	September 23	Phoenix Suns	Charlotte Hornets (Waived on July 24)	
Terence Davis	September 23	Sacramento Kings (Previously waived on September 10)		
David Duke Jr.	September 23	Phoenix Suns	San Antonio Spurs (Previously on a two-way contract)	
Braxton Key	September 23	Memphis Grizzlies	Golden State Warriors	
Tyrese Samuel	September 23	Phoenix Suns	Vancouver Bandits (Canada)	
Josh Giddey (RFA)	September 24	Chicago Bulls		
Precious Achiuwa	September 25	Miami Heat	New York Knicks	
Mo Bamba	September 25	Utah Jazz	New Orleans Pelicans (10-day contract ended March 19)	
Thomas Bryant	September 25	Cleveland Cavaliers	Indiana Pacers	
Alex Morales	September 25	Orlando Magic	Osceola Magic (NBA G League)	
Jeremiah Robinson-Earl	September 26	Dallas Mavericks	New Orleans Pelicans	
Jared Rhoden	September 27	Toronto Raptors (Previously waived on July 1)		
Anton Watson	September 27	Los Angeles Lakers	New York Knicks (Previously on a two-way contract)	
Nate Williams	September 27	Los Angeles Lakers	Houston Rockets (Waived on July 13)	
Delon Wright	September 27	Indiana Pacers	New York Knicks	
Jules Bernard	September 28	Minnesota Timberwolves	Cleveland Charge (NBA G League)	
Alize Johnson	September 28	Minnesota Timberwolves	Kawasaki Brave Thunders (Japan)	
Zyon Pullin	September 28	Minnesota Timberwolves	Memphis Grizzlies (Waived on July 20)	
Marques Bolden	September 29	Golden State Warriors	Charlotte Hornets (Waived on July 3, 2024; previously on a two-way contract)	
Jalen Bridges	September 29	Boston Celtics	Phoenix Suns (Previously on a two-way contract)	
Kendall Brown	September 29	Boston Celtics	Brooklyn Nets (Waived on March 4)	
LJ Cryer	September 29	Golden State Warriors	Houston (Undrafted in 2025)	
Ja'Vier Francis	September 29	Golden State Warriors	Houston (Undrafted in 2025)	
Ron Harper Jr.	September 29	Boston Celtics	Detroit Pistons (Waived on July 24)	
Taevion Kinsey	September 29	Golden State Warriors	Salt Lake City Stars (NBA G League)	
Chance McMillian	September 29	Golden State Warriors	Texas Tech (Undrafted in 2025)	
Jacksen Moni	September 29	Golden State Warriors	North Dakota (Undrafted in 2025)	
Wendell Moore Jr.	September 29	Boston Celtics	Charlotte Hornets (Previously on a two-way contract)	
Gary Payton II	September 29	Golden State Warriors		
MarJon Beauchamp	September 30	Portland Trail Blazers	New York Knicks (Previously on a two-way contract)	
Javonte Cooke	September 30	Portland Trail Blazers	Oklahoma City Blue (NBA G League)	
Jonathan Kuminga (RFA)	September 30	Golden State Warriors		
Liam Robbins	September 30	Portland Trail Blazers	Milwaukee Bucks (Waived on February 27)	
Seth Curry	October 1	Golden State Warriors	Charlotte Hornets	
Akoldah Gak	October 1	Washington Wizards	Mexico City Capitanes (NBA G League)	
Quentin Grimes (RFA)	October 1	Philadelphia 76ers		
Al Horford	October 1	Golden State Warriors	Boston Celtics	
De'Anthony Melton	October 1	Golden State Warriors	Brooklyn Nets	
Leaky Black	October 2	Washington Wizards	Capital City Go-Go (NBA G League)	
Andrew Carr	October 3	Portland Trail Blazers	Kentucky (Undrafted in 2025)	
Johnell Davis	October 5	Orlando Magic	Arkansas (Undrafted in 2025)	
Max Abmas	October 6	Utah Jazz	Salt Lake City Stars (NBA G League)	
Jalen Crutcher	October 6	Orlando Magic	Birmingham Squadron (NBA G League)	
Skal Labissière	October 6	Washington Wizards	Stockton Kings (NBA G League)	
Cameron McGriff	October 6	Utah Jazz	Indiana Mad Ants (NBA G League)	
Dalano Banton	October 7	Dallas Mavericks	Portland Trail Blazers	
Sean Pedulla	October 7	Portland Trail Blazers	Mississippi (Undrafted in 2025)	
Kevin Knox II	October 9	Chicago Bulls	Golden State Warriors	
Cameron Payne	October 9	Indiana Pacers	New York Knicks	
Gabe Madsen	October 10	Miami Heat (Previously waived on September 25)		
Charlie Brown Jr.	October 13	Memphis Grizzlies	Raptors 905 (NBA G League)	
Kadary Richmond	October 13	Washington Wizards	St. John's (Undrafted in 2025)	
Javonte Smart	October 13	Orlando Magic	Osceola Magic (NBA G League)	
Phillip Wheeler	October 13	Orlando Magic	Piratas de Quebradillas (Puerto Rico)	
Alondes Williams	October 13	Washington Wizards	Sioux Falls Skyforce (NBA G League)	
Pedro Bradshaw	October 14	Utah Jazz	Rostock Seawolves (Germany)	
Sean East II	October 14	Utah Jazz	Edmonton Stingers (Canada)	
Steve Settle III	October 14	Miami Heat	Temple (Undrafted in 2025)	
DaQuan Jeffries	October 15	Sacramento Kings	Charlotte Hornets (Waived on September 18)	
Grant Nelson	October 15	Brooklyn Nets	Alabama (Undrafted in 2025)	
Johnny Davis	October 16	Milwaukee Bucks	Westchester Knicks (NBA G League)	
Nate Hinton	October 16	Memphis Grizzlies	Ratiopharm Ulm (Germany)	
Bez Mbeng	October 16	Miami Heat	Yale (Undrafted in 2025)	
Jeremiah Tilmon	October 16	Milwaukee Bucks	Shenzhen Leopards (China)	
Russell Westbrook	October 16	Sacramento Kings	Denver Nuggets	
Ricky Council IV	October 17	Houston Rockets	Philadelphia 76ers (Waived on July 25)	
Mac McClung	October 17	Chicago Bulls	Orlando Magic (Previously on a two-way contract)	
Keaton Wallace	October 18	Atlanta Hawks (Previously on a two-way contract)		
DeAndre Jordan	October 24	New Orleans Pelicans	Denver Nuggets	
Charles Bassey	October 27	Memphis Grizzlies (10-day contract)	Atlanta Hawks (Waived on October 18)	
Mac McClung	October 28	Indiana Pacers	Chicago Bulls (Waived on October 17)	
Jeremiah Robinson-Earl	November 1	Indiana Pacers (10-day contract)	Dallas Mavericks (Waived on October 17)	
Precious Achiuwa	November 4	Sacramento Kings	Miami Heat (Waived on October 18)	
Cody Martin	November 5	Indiana Pacers (10-day contract)	Phoenix Suns (Waived on June 30)	
Isaac Jones ^{C}	November 6	Detroit Pistons	Sacramento Kings (Waived on November 4)	
Monté Morris	November 7	Indiana Pacers	Phoenix Suns	
Jeremiah Robinson-Earl	November 11	Indiana Pacers (Second 10-day contract)		
Garrison Mathews	November 20	Indiana Pacers (10-day contract)	New York Knicks (Waived on October 18)	
Jeremiah Robinson-Earl	November 21	Indiana Pacers (Signed for rest of season)		
Kobe Bufkin	November 25	Memphis Grizzlies (10-day contract)	South Bay Lakers (NBA G League)	
Seth Curry	December 1	Golden State Warriors (Previously waived on October 18)		
Garrison Mathews	December 1	Indiana Pacers (Second 10-day contract)		
Garrison Mathews	December 11	Indiana Pacers (Signed for rest of season)		
Gabe McGlothan	December 16	Indiana Pacers (10-day contract)	Noblesville Boom (NBA G League)	
James Wiseman	December 20	Indiana Pacers (Previously waived on October 27)		
Christian Koloko	December 22	Memphis Grizzlies (10-day contract)	Austin Spurs (NBA G League)	
Micah Potter	December 26	Indiana Pacers	Austin Spurs (NBA G League)	
Mo Bamba	December 29	Toronto Raptors	Salt Lake City Stars (NBA G League)	
Christian Koloko	January 2	Memphis Grizzlies (Second 10-day contract)		
Tony Bradley	January 8	Indiana Pacers (Previously waived on January 5)		
Kobe Bufkin	January 13	Los Angeles Lakers (10-day contract)	South Bay Lakers (NBA G League)	
Jeremiah Robinson-Earl	January 17	Dallas Mavericks (10-day contract)	Texas Legends (NBA G League)	
Tony Bradley	January 19	Indiana Pacers (Second 10-day contract)		
Patrick Baldwin Jr.	January 20	Los Angeles Clippers (10-day contract)	San Diego Clippers (NBA G League)	
Charles Bassey	January 26	Philadelphia 76ers (10-day contract)	Santa Cruz Warriors (NBA G League)	
Skal Labissière	January 27	Washington Wizards (10-day contract)	Capital City Go-Go (NBA G League)	
Patrick Baldwin Jr.	February 5	Philadelphia 76ers (10-day contract)	San Diego Clippers (NBA G League)	
Dominick Barlow	February 5	Philadelphia 76ers (Previously on a two-way contract)		
Charles Bassey	February 5	Philadelphia 76ers (Second 10-day contract)		
Jevon Carter	February 6	Orlando Magic	Chicago Bulls (Waived on February 1)	
Keshon Gilbert	February 6	Washington Wizards (10-day contract)	Capital City Go-Go (NBA G League)	
Amari Williams	February 6	Boston Celtics (Previously on a two-way contract)		
Kobe Bufkin	February 8	Los Angeles Lakers	South Bay Lakers (NBA G League)	
Cam Thomas	February 8	Milwaukee Bucks	Brooklyn Nets (Waived on February 5)	
Pat Connaughton	February 9	Charlotte Hornets (Previously waived on February 4)		
Daniss Jenkins	February 9	Detroit Pistons (Previously on a two-way contract)		
Lawson Lovering	February 9	Memphis Grizzlies (10-day contract)	Memphis Hustle (NBA G League)	
Pat Spencer	February 9	Golden State Warriors (Previously on a two-way contract)		
Kadary Richmond	February 11	Washington Wizards (10-day contract)	Capital City Go-Go (NBA G League)	
Nae'Qwan Tomlin	February 11	Cleveland Cavaliers (Previously on a two-way contract)		
Jeremy Sochan	February 13	New York Knicks	San Antonio Spurs (Waived on February 11)	
Alondes Williams	February 16	Washington Wizards (10-day contract)	Capital City Go-Go (NBA G League)	
Mike Conley Jr.	February 17	Minnesota Timberwolves	Charlotte Hornets (Waived on February 5)	
Mason Plumlee	February 17	San Antonio Spurs (10-day contract)	Oklahoma City Thunder (Waived on February 4)	
Myron Gardner	February 18	Miami Heat (Previously on a two-way contract)		
Haywood Highsmith	February 18	Phoenix Suns	Brooklyn Nets (Waived on February 5)	
Jordan Miller	February 18	Los Angeles Clippers (Previously on a two-way contract)		
Cameron Payne	February 18	Philadelphia 76ers	Partizan (Serbia)	
Caleb Houstan	February 19	Atlanta Hawks (Previously on a two-way contract)		
Spencer Jones	February 19	Philadelphia 76ers (Previously on a two-way contract)		
Jabari Walker	February 19	Philadelphia 76ers (Previously on a two-way contract)		
Dalano Banton	February 20	Boston Celtics (10-day contract)	Los Angeles Clippers (10-day contract ended February 19)	
Sidy Cissoko	February 20	Portland Trail Blazers (Previously on a two-way contract)		
Bryce McGowens	February 20	New Orleans Pelicans (Previously on a two-way contract)		
John Tonje	February 20	Boston Celtics (10-day contract, previously on a two-way contract)		
Tristan Vukčević	February 21	Washington Wizards (Previously on a two-way contract)		
Rayan Rupert	February 22	Memphis Grizzlies (10-day contract)	Portland Trail Blazers (Waived on February 20)	
Killian Hayes	February 23	Sacramento Kings (10-day contract)	Cleveland Charge (NBA G League)	
Mo Bamba	February 26	Utah Jazz (10-day contract)	Salt Lake City Stars (NBA G League)	
Taj Gibson	February 26	Memphis Grizzlies	Charlotte Hornets	
Jamir Watkins	February 26	Washington Wizards (Previously on a two-way contract)		
Grant Nelson	February 27	Brooklyn Nets (10-day contract)	Long Island Nets (NBA G League)	
Mason Plumlee	February 27	San Antonio Spurs (Signed for rest of season)		
Quenton Jackson	February 28	Indiana Pacers (Previously on a two-way contract)		
Ryan Nembhard	March 1	Dallas Mavericks (Previously on a two-way contract)		
Kyle Anderson	March 2	Minnesota Timberwolves	Memphis Grizzlies (Waived on February 26)	
Jamaree Bouyea	March 2	Phoenix Suns (Previously on a two-way contract)		
Olivier-Maxence Prosper	March 4	Memphis Grizzlies (Previously on a two-way contract)		
Killian Hayes	March 5	Sacramento Kings (Second 10-day contract)		
Tyus Jones	March 5	Denver Nuggets	Dallas Mavericks (Waived on February 28)	
Mo Bamba	March 8	Utah Jazz (Second 10-day contract)		
Andersson Garcia	March 11	Utah Jazz (10-day contract)	Mexico City Capitanes (NBA G League)	
Tyler Burton	March 12	Memphis Grizzlies (10-day contract)	Memphis Hustle (NBA G League)	
DeJon Jarreau	March 13	Memphis Grizzlies (10-day contract)	Memphis Hustle (NBA G League)	
Bez Mbeng	March 13	Utah Jazz (10-day contract)	Sioux Falls Skyforce (NBA G League)	
Killian Hayes	March 14	Sacramento Kings (Signed for rest of season)		
Malachi Smith	March 14	Brooklyn Nets (10-day contract)	Long Island Nets (NBA G League)	
Charles Bassey	March 15	Boston Celtics (10-day contract)	Santa Cruz Warriors (NBA G League)	
Max Shulga	March 15	Boston Celtics (Previously on a two-way contract)		
Ömer Yurtseven	March 15	Golden State Warriors (10-day contract)	Rio Grande Valley Vipers (NBA G League)	
Jamal Cain	March 20	Orlando Magic (Previously on a two-way contract)		
Kennedy Chandler	March 21	Utah Jazz (10-day contract)	Delaware Blue Coats (NBA G League)	
Tyler Burton	March 23	Memphis Grizzlies (Second 10-day contract)		
DeJon Jarreau	March 23	Memphis Grizzlies (Second 10-day contract)		
Bez Mbeng	March 23	Utah Jazz (Second 10-day contract)		
Pete Nance	March 23	Milwaukee Bucks (Previously on a two-way contract)		
Markelle Fultz	March 24	Toronto Raptors (10-day contract)	Raptors 905 (NBA G League)	
Charles Bassey	March 25	Boston Celtics (Second 10-day contract)		
Malachi Smith	March 25	Brooklyn Nets (Second 10-day contract)		
Ömer Yurtseven	March 25	Golden State Warriors (Second 10-day contract)		
DaQuan Jeffries	March 26	Sacramento Kings (10-day contract)	Stockton Kings (NBA G League)	
Adama Bal	March 28	Memphis Grizzlies (10-day contract)	Westchester Knicks (NBA G League)	
Lucas Williamson	March 31	Memphis Grizzlies (10-day contract)	Windy City Bulls (NBA G League)	
Kennedy Chandler	April 1	Utah Jazz (Second 10-day contract)		
Trevon Scott	April 2	Brooklyn Nets (10-day contract)	Long Island Nets (NBA G League)	
Bez Mbeng	April 3	Utah Jazz (Signed for rest of season)		
Toby Okani	April 3	Memphis Grizzlies (10-day contract)	Westchester Knicks (NBA G League)	
Dariq Whitehead	April 3	Memphis Grizzlies (10-day contract)	Oklahoma City Blue (NBA G League)	
Malachi Smith	April 4	Brooklyn Nets (Signed for rest of season)		
Charles Bassey	April 5	Golden State Warriors (10-day contract)	Boston Celtics (10-day contract)	
Ron Harper Jr.	April 5	Boston Celtics (Previously on a two-way contract)		
Tony Bradley	April 6	Atlanta Hawks	Indiana Pacers (10-day contract)	
Tyreke Key	April 6	Toronto Raptors	Raptors 905 (NBA G League)	
Adama Bal	April 7	Memphis Grizzlies (Second 10-day contract)		
JD Davison	April 7	Houston Rockets (Previously on a two-way contract)		
Tolu Smith	April 7	Detroit Pistons (Previously on a two-way contract)		
Mouhamadou Gueye	April 9	Chicago Bulls	Windy City Bulls (NBA G League)	
Dalen Terry	April 10	Philadelphia 76ers (Previously on a two-way contract)		
Lucas Williamson	April 10	Memphis Grizzlies (Second 10-day contract)		
Dalano Banton	April 11	Boston Celtics	Texas Legends (NBA G League)	
Hayden Gray	April 11	Utah Jazz	Maine Celtics (NBA G League)	
Jahmir Young	April 11	Miami Heat (Previously on a two-way contract)		
Trevon Scott	April 12	Brooklyn Nets (Second 10-day contract)		
Nick Smith Jr.	April 12	Los Angeles Lakers (Previously on a two-way contract)		
Alec Burks			Miami Heat	
Jalen Hood-Schifino			Philadelphia 76ers (Previously on a two-way contract)	
James Johnson			Indiana Pacers	
Markieff Morris			Los Angeles Lakers	
Ben Simmons			Los Angeles Clippers	
Tristan Thompson			Cleveland Cavaliers	

* Player option
** Team option
*** Early termination option

=== Two-way contracts ===
Per recent NBA rules implemented as of the 2025–26 season, teams are permitted to have three two-way players on their roster at any given time, in addition to their 15-man regular season roster. A two-way player will provide services primarily to the team's G League affiliate, but can spend up to 50 days with the parent NBA team. Only players with four or fewer years of NBA experience are able to sign two-way contracts, which can be for either one season or two. Players entering training camp for a team have a chance to convert their training camp deal into a two-way contract if they prove themselves worthy enough for it. Teams also have the option to convert a two-way contract into a regular, minimum-salary NBA contract, at which point the player becomes a regular member of the parent NBA team. Two-way players are not eligible for NBA playoff rosters, so a team must convert any two-way players it wants to use in the playoffs, while waiving another player in the process.

	Denotes players who were promoted to the main roster
	Denotes players who were cut before season's end
	Denotes players who were traded away before season's end
^{C}	Denotes players who are claimed off waivers (same contract, different team)
^{T}	Denotes players acquired in a trade

Player	Date signed	Team	School / Club team	Ref
Jesse Edwards (RFA)	June 29	Minnesota Timberwolves (Previously on a two-way contract)		
Emanuel Miller (RFA)	June 29	Chicago Bulls (Previously on a two-way contract)		
Trentyn Flowers (RFA)	July 1	Los Angeles Clippers (Previously on a two-way contract)		
Chucky Hepburn	July 1	Toronto Raptors	Louisville Cardinals (Undrafted in 2025)	
Caleb Love	July 1	Portland Trail Blazers	Arizona Wildcats (Undrafted in 2025)	
Hunter Sallis	July 1	Philadelphia 76ers	Wake Forest Demon Deacons (Undrafted in 2025)	
Luke Travers (RFA)	July 1	Cleveland Cavaliers (Previously on a two-way contract)		
Tamar Bates	July 2	Denver Nuggets	Missouri Tigers (Undrafted in 2025)	
Dylan Cardwell	July 2	Sacramento Kings	Auburn Tigers (Undrafted in 2025)	
Vladislav Goldin	July 2	Miami Heat	Michigan Wolverines (Undrafted in 2025)	
Lachlan Olbrich	July 2	Chicago Bulls	Illawarra Hawks	
Trey Alexander (RFA)	July 3	New Orleans Pelicans	Denver Nuggets (Previously on a two-way contract)	
Brooks Barnhizer	July 3	Oklahoma City Thunder	Northwestern Wildcats	
Hunter Dickinson	July 3	New Orleans Pelicans	Kansas Jayhawks (Undrafted in 2025)	
Tyson Etienne (RFA)	July 3	Brooklyn Nets (Previously on a two-way contract)		
C. J. Huntley	July 3	Phoenix Suns	Appalachian State Mountaineers (Undrafted in 2025)	
Spencer Jones (RFA)	July 3	Denver Nuggets (Previously on a two-way contract)		
Miles Kelly	July 3	Dallas Mavericks	Auburn Tigers (Undrafted in 2025)	
Eli Ndiaye	July 3	Atlanta Hawks	Real Madrid (Undrafted in 2025)	
Ryan Nembhard	July 3	Dallas Mavericks	Gonzaga Bulldogs (Undrafted in 2025)	
Mark Sears	July 3	Milwaukee Bucks	Alabama Crimson Tide (Undrafted in 2025)	
Kevon Harris	July 5	Houston Rockets	College Park Skyhawks (NBA G League)	
Jabari Walker	July 5	Philadelphia 76ers	Portland Trail Blazers	
Jamir Watkins	July 6	Washington Wizards	Florida State Seminoles	
Koby Brea	July 7	Phoenix Suns	Kentucky Wildcats	
RJ Luis Jr.	July 7	Utah Jazz	St. John's Red Storm (Undrafted in 2025)	
Isaiah Stevens	July 8	Sacramento Kings	Miami Heat (Previously on a two-way contract)	
Quenton Jackson (RFA)	July 8	Indiana Pacers (Previously on a two-way contract)		
Isaiah Livers	July 8	Phoenix Suns	Detroit Pistons	
Dominick Barlow	July 9	Philadelphia 76ers	Atlanta Hawks	
Rocco Zikarsky	July 9	Minnesota Timberwolves	Brisbane Bullets	
Alijah Martin	July 10	Toronto Raptors	Florida Gators	
Kobe Sanders	July 10	Los Angeles Clippers	Nevada Wolf Pack	
Javon Small	July 10	Memphis Grizzlies	West Virginia Mountaineers	
Jacob Toppin	July 10	Atlanta Hawks		
Tristan Vukčević	July 10	Washington Wizards		
Drew Peterson	July 16	Charlotte Hornets	Boston Celtics	
Keaton Wallace	July 18	Atlanta Hawks		
Yuki Kawamura	July 19	Chicago Bulls	Memphis Grizzlies	
PJ Hall	July 20	Memphis Grizzlies	Denver Nuggets	
Curtis Jones	July 21	Denver Nuggets	Iowa State Cyclones (Undrafted in 2025)	
Orlando Robinson	July 21	Orlando Magic	Toronto Raptors	
Christian Koloko	July 22	Los Angeles Lakers		
David Jones García	July 23	San Antonio Spurs	Mexico City Capitanes	
Myron Gardner	July 24	Miami Heat	Osceola Magic (NBA G League)	
Chris Mañon	July 24	Los Angeles Lakers	Vanderbilt Commodores (Undrafted in 2025)	
Taelon Peter	July 24	Indiana Pacers	Liberty Flames	
Jamal Cain	July 25	Orlando Magic	New Orleans Pelicans (Previously on a two-way contract)	
Antonio Reeves	July 25	Charlotte Hornets	New Orleans Pelicans (Waived on July 3)	
Isaiah Crawford	July 26	Houston Rockets	Sacramento Kings (Previously on a two-way contract)	
JD Davison	July 26	Houston Rockets	Boston Celtics (Waived on July 24)	
Colby Jones	July 28	Detroit Pistons	Oklahoma City Thunder (Waived on June 28)	
Jordan Miller	July 29	Los Angeles Clippers (Previously waived on July 8)		
Bryce McGowens	July 30	New Orleans Pelicans	Portland Trail Blazers (Previously on a two-way contract)	
Daeqwon Plowden	July 30	Sacramento Kings	Phoenix Suns (Waived on July 6)	
Max Shulga	July 30	Boston Celtics	VCU Rams	
Enrique Freeman	August 1	Minnesota Timberwolves	Indiana Pacers (Previously on a two-way contract)	
Daniss Jenkins	August 2	Detroit Pistons (Previously on a two-way contract)		
Riley Minix	August 5	San Antonio Spurs (Previously on two-way contracts)		
Harrison Ingram	August 6	San Antonio Spurs (Previously on two-way contracts)		
Amari Williams	August 15	Boston Celtics	Kentucky Wildcats	
Oscar Tshiebwe	August 18	Utah Jazz (Previously on a two-way contract)		
John Tonje	August 26	Utah Jazz	Wisconsin Badgers	
E. J. Liddell	September 3	Brooklyn Nets	Chicago Bulls (Previously on a two-way contract)	
Olivier-Maxence Prosper	September 4	Memphis Grizzlies	Dallas Mavericks (Waived on August 29)	
Tristen Newton (RFA)	September 15	Minnesota Timberwolves (Previously on a two-way contract)		
Tosan Evbuomwan	September 16	New York Knicks	Brooklyn Nets (Waived on August 29)	
Trey Jemison	September 16	New York Knicks	Los Angeles Lakers (Waived on July 21)	
Kevin McCullar Jr. (RFA)	September 16	New York Knicks (Previously on a two-way contract)		
Branden Carlson (RFA)	September 26	Oklahoma City Thunder (Previously on a two-way contract)		
Pat Spencer	September 29	Golden State Warriors		
Alex Toohey	September 29	Golden State Warriors	Sydney Kings (Australia)	
Nick Smith Jr.	September 30	Los Angeles Lakers	Charlotte Hornets (Waived on September 25)	
Alex Antetokounmpo	October 16	Milwaukee Bucks	Aris Thessaloniki (Greece)	
Ron Harper Jr.	October 16	Boston Celtics		
Trentyn Flowers	October 17	Chicago Bulls	Los Angeles Clippers (Waived on October 14)	
Colin Castleton	October 18	Orlando Magic		
Moussa Cissé	October 18	Dallas Mavericks		
Caleb Houstan	October 18	Atlanta Hawks		
Johnny Juzang	October 18	Minnesota Timberwolves		
A.J. Lawson	October 18	Toronto Raptors (Previously waived on October 16)		
Jahmyl Telfort	October 18	Los Angeles Clippers	Butler (Undrafted in 2025)	
Jahmir Young	October 18	Miami Heat		
Chris Youngblood	October 18	Oklahoma City Thunder	Alabama (Undrafted in 2025)	
Javonte Cooke	October 20	Portland Trail Blazers (Previously waived on October 17)		
Wendell Moore Jr.	November 10	Detroit Pistons	Maine Celtics (NBA G League)	
Jamaree Bouyea	November 18	Phoenix Suns	Austin Spurs (NBA G League)	
Drew Timme	November 25	Los Angeles Lakers	South Bay Lakers (NBA G League)	
Ethan Thompson	November 30	Indiana Pacers	Sioux Falls Skyforce (NBA G League)	
LJ Cryer	December 2	Golden State Warriors	Santa Cruz Warriors (NBA G League)	
Tyler Smith	December 2	Houston Rockets	Capital City Go-Go (NBA G League)	
RayJ Dennis	December 5	Los Angeles Clippers	Indiana Pacers (Waived on November 30)	
Malevy Leons	December 8	Golden State Warriors	Oklahoma City Blue (NBA G League)	
Kyle Mangas	December 13	San Antonio Spurs	Austin Spurs (NBA G League)	
Stanley Umude	December 23	San Antonio Spurs	Austin Spurs (NBA G League)	
Malik Williams	December 23	Atlanta Hawks	College Park Skyhawks (NBA G League)	
PJ Hall	December 24	Charlotte Hornets	Greensboro Swarm (NBA G League)	
MarJon Beauchamp	December 26	Philadelphia 76ers	Delaware Blue Coats (NBA G League)	
Chaney Johnson	December 26	Brooklyn Nets	Cleveland Charge (NBA G League)	
TyTy Washington Jr.	December 27	Los Angeles Clippers	San Diego Clippers (NBA G League)	
RayJ Dennis	December 31	Atlanta Hawks	Los Angeles Clippers (Waived on December 27)	
Tristen Newton	January 3	Houston Rockets	Iowa Wolves (NBA G League)	
Yuki Kawamura	January 6	Chicago Bulls (Previously waived on October 17)		
Christian Koloko	January 17	Atlanta Hawks	Austin Spurs (NBA G League)	
Dillon Jones	January 20	New York Knicks	Rip City Remix (NBA G League)	
Tristan Enaruna	January 28	Cleveland Cavaliers	Cleveland Charge (NBA G League)	
Mac McClung	February 5	Chicago Bulls	Windy City Bulls (NBA G League)	
Buddy Boeheim	February 6	Oklahoma City Thunder	Oklahoma City Blue (NBA G League)	
Tosan Evbuomwan	February 6	Charlotte Hornets	Maine Celtics (NBA G League)	
Blake Hinson	February 9	Utah Jazz	Rip City Remix (NBA G League)	
Isaac Jones	February 10	Detroit Pistons (Previously waived on February 4)		
Dalen Terry	February 10	Philadelphia 76ers	New Orleans Pelicans (Waived on February 6)	
Riley Minix	February 14	Cleveland Cavaliers	Cleveland Charge (NBA G League)	
Alex Morales	February 17	Orlando Magic	Osceola Magic (NBA G League)	
Nate Williams	February 17	Golden State Warriors	Long Island Nets (NBA G League)	
Trevor Keels	February 18	Miami Heat	Sioux Falls Skyforce (NBA G League)	
Tyrese Martin	February 19	Philadelphia 76ers	Brooklyn Nets (Waived on February 5)	
KJ Simpson	February 19	Denver Nuggets	Charlotte Hornets (Waived on February 6)	
Darius Brown	February 20	Cleveland Cavaliers	Cleveland Charge (NBA G League)	
Norchad Omier	February 20	Los Angeles Clippers	Cleveland Charge (NBA G League)	
Sean Pedulla	February 20	Los Angeles Clippers	Rip City Remix (NBA G League)	
Leaky Black	February 21	Washington Wizards	Capital City Go-Go (NBA G League)	
Patrick Baldwin Jr.	February 22	Sacramento Kings	San Diego Clippers (NBA G League)	
Emanuel Miller	February 23	San Antonio Spurs	Cleveland Cavaliers (Waived on February 20)	
Jules Bernard	February 25	Minnesota Timberwolves	Iowa Wolves (NBA G League)	
Cormac Ryan	February 26	Milwaukee Bucks	Wisconsin Herd (NBA G League)	
Julian Reese	February 28	Washington Wizards	Raptors 905 (NBA G League)	
Jalen Slawson	February 28	Indiana Pacers	Noblesville Boom (NBA G League)	
Tyler Smith	March 1	Dallas Mavericks	Rio Grande Valley Vipers (NBA G League)	
John Tonje	March 1	Boston Celtics (Previously on a 10-day contract)		
C. J. Huntley	March 2	Phoenix Suns	Valley Suns (NBA G League)	
Payton Sandfort	March 2	Oklahoma City Thunder	Oklahoma City Blue (NBA G League)	
Zyon Pullin	March 2	Minnesota Timberwolves	Iowa Wolves (NBA G League)	
Jayson Kent	March 3	Portland Trail Blazers	Rip City Remix (NBA G League)	
John Poulakidas	March 3	Dallas Mavericks	San Diego Clippers (NBA G League)	
Chris Youngblood	March 3	Portland Trail Blazers	Oklahoma City Thunder (Waived on February 6)	
Keshon Gilbert	March 4	Atlanta Hawks	College Park Skyhawks (NBA G League)	
Josh Oduro	March 4	New Orleans Pelicans	Birmingham Squadron (NBA G League)	
Rayan Rupert	March 4	Memphis Grizzlies (Previously on a 10-day contract)		
Olivier Sarr	March 4	Cleveland Cavaliers	Raptors 905 (NBA G League)	
David Roddy	March 5	Denver Nuggets	Raptors 905 (NBA G League)	

=== Going to other North American leagues ===
The new league of all players is the NBA G League, although some players have returned to their former team, as shown below. The NBA contract status of nearly all players is unrestricted free agent, and the rest is stated otherwise.

*	Denotes NBA G League players who returned to their former team
^{†}	Previously on a two-way contract
	Denotes players whose NBA contract status is unsigned draft pick
^{R}	Denotes unsigned players whose free-agent rights were renounced

Player	Date signed	New team	NBA team	Ref
Mo Bamba	October 27	Salt Lake City Stars	New Orleans Pelicans	
Keion Brooks Jr.*	November 6	Birmingham Squadron	New Orleans Pelicans	
PJ Hall	November 21	Mexico City Capitanes	Memphis Grizzlies	
Josh Christopher*	November 29	Sioux Falls Skyforce	Miami Heat	
Keon Johnson	December 2	Maine Celtics	Brooklyn Nets	
Elfrid Payton	December 15	Austin Spurs	New Orleans Pelicans	
Tosan Evbuomwan	January 15	Maine Celtics	New York Knicks	
Markelle Fultz	March 6	Raptors 905	Sacramento Kings	

=== Going abroad ===
The following players were previously on NBA rosters, but chose to sign with abroad teams after their contract expired and they became free agents. The list also includes unsigned 2025 draft picks who signed with overseas teams, but excludes unsigned 2024 draft picks who were already playing overseas before the draft.

	Denotes players whose NBA contract status is unsigned draft pick
*	Denotes international players who returned to their home country
^{†}	Denotes players who were on a two-way contract

Player	Date signed	New team	New country	Former NBA team	Ref
Oshae Brissett	July 15	Maccabi Tel Aviv	Israel	Philadelphia 76ers	
Vasilije Micić	July 16	Hapoel Tel Aviv	Israel	Phoenix Suns	
Saliou Niang *	July 16	Virtus Bologna	Italy	Cleveland Cavaliers	
Vlatko Čančar	July 22	Olimpia Milano	Italy	Denver Nuggets	
Lamar Stevens	July 22	Paris	France	Memphis Grizzlies	
Maxwell Lewis	July 24	Tofaş	Turkey	Brooklyn Nets	
Shake Milton	July 24	Partizan	Serbia	Los Angeles Lakers	
Tazé Moore ^{†}	July 24	Varese	Italy	Portland Trail Blazers	
Adama Sanogo ^{†}	July 25	Trapani Shark	Italy	Chicago Bulls	
Alex Ducas * ^{†}	July 28	Brisbane Bullets	Australia	Oklahoma City Thunder	
Chuma Okeke	July 30	Real Madrid	Spain	Cleveland Cavaliers	
Brandon Boston Jr.	August 4	Fenerbahçe	Turkey	New Orleans Pelicans	
Lonnie Walker IV	August 4	Maccabi Tel Aviv	Israel	Philadelphia 76ers	
Jeff Dowtin Jr. ^{†}	August 5	Maccabi Tel Aviv	Israel	Philadelphia 76ers	
Jack McVeigh * ^{†}	August 5	Cairns Taipans	Australia	Houston Rockets	
Richaun Holmes	August 9	Panathinaikos	Greece	Washington Wizards	
Jesse Edwards ^{†}	August 11	Melbourne United	Australia	Minnesota Timberwolves	
Cole Swider	August 11	Anadolu Efes	Turkey	Toronto Raptors	
Miles Norris ^{†}	August 22	Barcelona	Spain	Boston Celtics	
Damion Lee	August 24	Ironi Ness Ziona	Israel	Phoenix Suns	
Cui Yongxi * ^{†}	August 30	Guangdong Southern Tigers	China	Brooklyn Nets	
Talen Horton-Tucker	September 1	Fenerbahçe	Turkey	Chicago Bulls	
Trey Lyles	September 5	Real Madrid	Spain	Sacramento Kings	
Mason Jones ^{†}	September 6	Perth Wildcats	Australia	Sacramento Kings	
Kai Jones ^{†}	September 12	Anadolu Efes	Turkey	Dallas Mavericks	
Cam Reddish	September 12	Šiauliai	Lithuania	Los Angeles Lakers	
Trevelin Queen ^{†}	September 19	Guangdong Southern Tigers	China	Orlando Magic	
Taran Armstrong ^{†}	October 10	Dubai	United Arab Emirates	Golden State Warriors	
Jared Butler	October 23	Crvena zvezda	Serbia	Philadelphia 76ers	
Spencer Dinwiddie	October 23	Bayern Munich	Germany	Dallas Mavericks	
Braxton Key ^{†}	October 25	Valencia	Spain	Golden State Warriors	
Alex Len	October 30	Real Madrid	Spain	Los Angeles Lakers	
Jared Rhoden ^{†}	November 1	Paris	France	Toronto Raptors	
JT Thor ^{†}	November 11	Reggiana	Italy	Washington Wizards	
Matt Ryan ^{†}	November 13	Dubai	United Arab Emirates	New York Knicks	
Kenyon Martin Jr.	November 16	Ningbo Rockets	China	Utah Jazz	
Monté Morris	December 10	Olympiacos	Greece	Indiana Pacers	
Cameron Payne	December 23	Partizan	Serbia	New York Knicks	
Torrey Craig	January 14	Sydney Kings	Australia	Boston Celtics	
Cory Joseph	January 23	Olympiacos	Greece	Orlando Magic	
Josh Richardson	January 23	Casademont Zaragoza	Spain	Utah Jazz	
Nigel Hayes-Davis	February 12	Panathinaikos	Greece	Phoenix Suns	
Malik Beasley	February 13	Cangrejeros de Santurce	Puerto Rico	Detroit Pistons	
Bol Bol	February 19	TNT Tropang 5G	Philippines	Phoenix Suns	
Johnny Juzang ^{†}	February 28	Zenit	Russia	Minnesota Timberwolves	
Patty Mills	March 8	La Laguna Tenerife	Spain	Los Angeles Clippers	
Hunter Tyson	March 13	Gigantes de Carolina	Puerto Rico	Denver Nuggets	
Jae Crowder	March 22	Vaqueros de Bayamón	Puerto Rico	Sacramento Kings	

=== Waived ===
	Denotes player who did not clear waivers because his contract was claimed by another team
^{†}	Denotes players who were on a two-way contract
	Denotes player who was released before end of 10-day contract
	Denotes players whose contracts were voided

Player	Date waived	Former team	Ref
Maxwell Lewis	June 27	Brooklyn Nets	
Colby Jones	June 28	Oklahoma City Thunder	
Deandre Ayton	June 29	Portland Trail Blazers	
Anthony Gill	June 29	Washington Wizards	
Johnny Juzang	June 30	Utah Jazz	
Cody Martin	June 30	Phoenix Suns	
Drew Eubanks	July 1	Los Angeles Clippers	
Jordan Clarkson	July 1	Utah Jazz	
Jared Rhoden ^{†}	July 1	Toronto Raptors	
Chris Livingston	July 2	Milwaukee Bucks	
Antonio Reeves	July 3	New Orleans Pelicans	
Jock Landale	July 3	Houston Rockets	
David Roddy ^{†}	July 6	Atlanta Hawks	
Daeqwon Plowden ^{†}	July 6	Phoenix Suns	
Damian Lillard	July 7	Milwaukee Bucks	
Vasilije Micić	July 7	Milwaukee Bucks	
Jordan Miller	July 8	Los Angeles Clippers	
Seth Lundy ^{†}	July 9	Los Angeles Clippers	
Alex Reese ^{†}	July 9	Philadelphia 76ers	
Cole Anthony	July 12	Memphis Grizzlies	
Nate Williams	July 13	Houston Rockets	
Richaun Holmes	July 14	Washington Wizards	
Josh Okogie	July 15	Charlotte Hornets	
Bradley Beal	July 16	Phoenix Suns	
Blake Wesley	July 19	Washington Wizards	
Jahmir Young ^{†}	July 19	Chicago Bulls	
Jordan Goodwin	July 20	Los Angeles Lakers	
Shake Milton	July 20	Los Angeles Lakers	
Marcus Smart	July 20	Washington Wizards	
Zyon Pullin ^{†}	July 20	Memphis Grizzlies	
Trey Jemison ^{†}	July 21	Los Angeles Lakers	
Ethan Thompson ^{†}	July 22	Orlando Magic	
Damion Baugh ^{†}	July 24	Charlotte Hornets	
JD Davison	July 24	Boston Celtics	
Ron Harper Jr. ^{†}	July 24	Detroit Pistons	
Lester Quiñones ^{†}	July 24	New Orleans Pelicans	
Jaden Springer	July 24	Utah Jazz	
Ricky Council IV ^{†}	July 25	Philadelphia 76ers	
Patrick Baldwin Jr. ^{†}	July 28	Los Angeles Clippers	
Colin Castleton	July 28	Toronto Raptors	
Jaylen Martin ^{†}	August 4	Washington Wizards	
Miles Norris ^{†}	August 10	Boston Celtics	
Jesse Edwards ^{†}	August 16	Minnesota Timberwolves	
Tosan Evbuomwan ^{†}	August 29	Brooklyn Nets	
Olivier-Maxence Prosper	August 29	Dallas Mavericks	
Javan Johnson	September 4	Atlanta Hawks	
Dwight Murray Jr.	September 4	Atlanta Hawks	
Alex Schumacher	September 5	Phoenix Suns	
Quincy Guerrier	September 9	Toronto Raptors	
Jaden Shackelford	September 9	Phoenix Suns	
Terence Davis	September 10	Sacramento Kings	
Tyreke Key	September 10	Toronto Raptors	
Jarkel Joiner	September 11	Toronto Raptors	
Osayi Osifo	September 12	San Antonio Spurs	
Isaiah Miller	September 15	San Antonio Spurs	
Dink Pate	September 15	New York Knicks	
Bryson Warren	September 15	New York Knicks	
Jalon Moore	September 16	New Orleans Pelicans	
David Muoka	September 16	Brooklyn Nets	
Keon Johnson	September 17	Brooklyn Nets	
Johnny O'Neil	September 17	New Orleans Pelicans	
DaQuan Jeffries	September 18	Charlotte Hornets	
Keyontae Johnson	September 19	Charlotte Hornets	
Brandon Slater	September 20	Charlotte Hornets	
Marcus Garrett	September 22	Charlotte Hornets	
Kenyon Martin Jr.	September 23	Utah Jazz	
Nick Smith Jr.	September 25	Charlotte Hornets	
Ja'Vier Francis	September 29	Golden State Warriors	
Chance McMillian	September 29	Golden State Warriors	
Jacksen Moni	September 29	Golden State Warriors	
Mac McClung	October 17	Chicago Bulls	
Dillon Jones	October 19	Washington Wizards	
Jaden Springer	October 23	New Orleans Pelicans	
James Wiseman	October 27	Indiana Pacers	
Isaac Jones	November 4	Sacramento Kings	
Mac McClung	November 7	Indiana Pacers	
Colby Jones ^{†}	November 10	Detroit Pistons	
PJ Hall ^{†}	November 16	Memphis Grizzlies	
C. J. Huntley^{†}	November 17	Phoenix Suns	
Monté Morris	November 21	Indiana Pacers	
Christian Koloko^{†}	November 25	Los Angeles Lakers	
RayJ Dennis^{†}	November 30	Indiana Pacers	
Jackson Rowe^{†}	December 1	Golden State Warriors	
Kevon Harris^{†}	December 2	Houston Rockets	
Jahmyl Telfort^{†}	December 4	Los Angeles Clippers	
Alex Toohey^{†}	December 8	Golden State Warriors	
Jeremiah Robinson-Earl	December 11	Indiana Pacers	
Riley Minix^{†}	December 12	San Antonio Spurs	
Jacob Toppin^{†}	December 15	Atlanta Hawks	
Gabe McGlothan	December 20	Indiana Pacers	
Drew Peterson^{†}	December 23	Charlotte Hornets	
Garrison Mathews	December 26	Indiana Pacers	
James Wiseman	December 26	Indiana Pacers	
RayJ Dennis^{†}	December 27	Los Angeles Clippers	
Eli Ndiaye^{†}	December 31	Atlanta Hawks	
Tyler Smith^{†}	January 3	Houston Rockets	
Tony Bradley	January 5	Indiana Pacers	
Trentyn Flowers^{†}	January 6	Chicago Bulls	
Tosan Evbuomwan^{†}	January 7	New York Knicks	
Mark Sears^{†}	January 7	Milwaukee Bucks	
Malik Williams^{†}	January 7	Atlanta Hawks	
Chris Livingston^{†}	January 28	Cleveland Cavaliers	
Jevon Carter	February 1	Chicago Bulls	
Luke Travers^{†}	February 1	Cleveland Cavaliers	
Pat Connaughton	February 4	Charlotte Hornets	
Isaac Jones	February 4	Detroit Pistons	
Mason Plumlee	February 4	Oklahoma City Thunder	
Lonzo Ball	February 5	Utah Jazz	
Chris Boucher	February 5	Utah Jazz	
Mike Conley Jr.	February 5	Charlotte Hornets	
N'Faly Dante	February 5	Atlanta Hawks	
Nigel Hayes-Davis	February 5	Milwaukee Bucks	
Haywood Highsmith	February 5	Brooklyn Nets	
Tyrese Martin	February 5	Brooklyn Nets	
Georges Niang	February 5	Memphis Grizzlies	
Duop Reath	February 5	Atlanta Hawks	
Cam Thomas	February 5	Brooklyn Nets	
Hunter Tyson	February 5	Brooklyn Nets	
Eric Gordon	February 6	Memphis Grizzlies	
KJ Simpson^{†}	February 6	Charlotte Hornets	
Dalen Terry	February 6	New Orleans Pelicans	
Chris Youngblood^{†}	February 6	Oklahoma City Thunder	
Danté Exum	February 8	Washington Wizards	
Malaki Branham	February 9	Charlotte Hornets	
Dario Šarić	February 9	Detroit Pistons	
Jeremy Sochan	February 11	San Antonio Spurs	
Chris Paul	February 13	Toronto Raptors	
Orlando Robinson^{†}	February 17	Orlando Magic	
Nikola Đurišić	February 18	Atlanta Hawks	
Johnny Juzang^{†}	February 18	Minnesota Timberwolves	
Emanuel Miller^{†}	February 20	Cleveland Cavaliers	
Rayan Rupert	February 20	Portland Trail Blazers	
Stanley Umude	February 23	San Antonio Spurs	
Kyle Anderson	February 26	Memphis Grizzlies	
Cole Anthony	February 27	Phoenix Suns	
Jules Bernard^{†}	February 28	Minnesota Timberwolves	
Tyus Jones	February 28	Dallas Mavericks	
Buddy Boeheim^{†}	March 2	Oklahoma City Thunder	
Javonte Cooke^{†}	March 3	Portland Trail Blazers	
Miles Kelly^{†}	March 3	Dallas Mavericks	
Darius Brown^{†}	March 4	Cleveland Cavaliers	
Tamar Bates^{†}	March 5	Denver Nuggets	
Vince Williams Jr.	March 9	Utah Jazz	
Mo Bamba	March 13	Utah Jazz	
Cam Thomas	March 23	Milwaukee Bucks	
Jaden Ivey	March 30	Chicago Bulls	
Caleb Houstan	April 4	Atlanta Hawks	
Bobi Klintman	April 7	Detroit Pistons	
Kobe Bufkin	April 10	Los Angeles Lakers	
Tyreke Key	April 10	Toronto Raptors	
Cameron Payne	April 10	Philadelphia 76ers	
Terry Rozier	April 10	Miami Heat	

==== Training camp cuts ====
All players listed did not make the final roster.
^{†} On a two-way contract.
^{C} Claimed off waivers by another team.

Atlanta Hawks	Boston Celtics	Brooklyn Nets	Charlotte Hornets	Chicago Bulls
	Jalen Bridges; Kendall Brown; Wendell Moore Jr.	Drew Timme; Dariq Whitehead; Fanbo Zeng	Jonas Aidoo; Spencer Dinwiddie; DJ Rodman	Mouhamadou Gueye; Yuki Kawamura
Cleveland Cavaliers	Dallas Mavericks	Denver Nuggets	Detroit Pistons	Golden State Warriors
	Dalano Banton; Matthew Cleveland; Jeremiah Robinson-Earl; Dennis Smith Jr.	Terrence Hargrove Jr.; Coleman Hawkins		Marques Bolden; LJ Cryer; Seth Curry; Taevion Kinsey
Houston Rockets	Indiana Pacers	Los Angeles Clippers	Los Angeles Lakers	Memphis Grizzlies
	Cameron Payne; Kyle Guy; Ray Spalding; Delon Wright	Patrick Baldwin Jr.; Trentyn Flowers; Jason Preston; TyTy Washington Jr.	R.J. Davis; Augustas Marčiulionis; Anton Watson; Nate Williams	Charlie Brown Jr.; Tyler Burton; Nate Hinton; DeJon Jarreau; Braxton Key
Miami Heat	Milwaukee Bucks	Minnesota Timberwolves	New Orleans Pelicans	New York Knicks
Precious Achiuwa; Dain Dainja; Trevor Keels; Gabe Madsen; Bez Mbeng; Steve Settle III; Ethan Thompson	Jamaree Bouyea; Chris Livingston; Cormac Ryan	Jules Bernard; Alize Johnson; Tristen Newton; Zyon Pullin	Garrison Brooks; Jalen McDaniels	Adama Bal; Ibrahima Diallo; Romeo Langford; Alex Len; Garrison Mathews; Isaiah Roby; Matt Ryan; Donovan Williams
Oklahoma City Thunder	Orlando Magic	Philadelphia 76ers	Phoenix Suns	Portland Trail Blazers
	Jalen Crutcher; Johnell Davis; Justin Minaya; Alex Morales		Damion Baugh; Tyrese Samuel	MarJon Beauchamp; Andrew Carr; Javonte Cooke; Sean Pedulla; Liam Robbins
Sacramento Kings	San Antonio Spurs	Toronto Raptors	Utah Jazz	Washington Wizards
Dexter Dennis		Ulrich Chomche; A. J. Lawson; Jared Rhoden; David Roddy; Olivier Sarr	Max Abmas; Mo Bamba; Pedro Bradshaw; Steven Crowl; Sean East II; Cameron McGriff; Matthew Murrell	Leaky Black; Akoldah Gak; Keshon Gilbert; Skal Labissière; Jonathan Pierre

== Draft ==
The 2025 NBA draft was held on June 25–26, 2025, at Barclays Center in Brooklyn, New York for round one and at ESPN's Seaport District Studios in Manhattan, New York for round two the following day. In two rounds of the draft, 59 amateur United States college basketball players and other eligible players, including international players, will be selected. The following players signed a regular rookie contract unless noted otherwise.

Denotes players who signed a two-way contract
Denotes players whose NBA two-way contract was upgraded to standard NBA contract
Denotes players who are expected to play abroad
Denotes players who are expected to play in the NBA G League without signing an NBA contract

=== First round ===
Pick	Player	Date signed	Team (Note: Team denotes the team that holds the players' draft rights at the time of contract signing. Teams in parentheses denotes the teams that drafted the players before any trade occurred.)	Ref
1	Cooper Flagg	July 2	Dallas Mavericks	
2	Dylan Harper	July 3	San Antonio Spurs	
3	V. J. Edgecombe	July 1	Philadelphia 76ers	
4	Kon Knueppel	July 3	Charlotte Hornets	
5	Ace Bailey	July 2	Utah Jazz	
6	Tre Johnson	July 5	Washington Wizards	
7	Jeremiah Fears	July 5	New Orleans Pelicans	
8	Egor Dëmin	July 3	Brooklyn Nets	
9	Collin Murray-Boyles	July 1	Toronto Raptors	
10	Khaman Maluach	July 7	Phoenix Suns (rights acquired from Houston)	
11	Cedric Coward	July 7	Memphis Grizzlies (rights acquired from Portland)	
12	Noa Essengue	July 4	Chicago Bulls	
13	Derik Queen	July 5	New Orleans Pelicans (rights acquired from Atlanta)	
14	Carter Bryant	July 3	San Antonio Spurs	
15	Thomas Sorber	July 3	Oklahoma City Thunder	
16	Yang Hansen	July 1	Portland Trail Blazers (rights acquired from Memphis)	
17	Joan Beringer	July 7	Minnesota Timberwolves	
18	Walter Clayton Jr.	July 2	Utah Jazz (rights acquired from Washington)	
19	Nolan Traoré	July 4	Brooklyn Nets	
20	Kasparas Jakučionis	July 1	Miami Heat	
21	Will Riley	July 6	Washington Wizards (rights acquired from Utah)	
22	Drake Powell	July 8	Brooklyn Nets (rights acquired from Atlanta)	
23	Asa Newell	July 3	Atlanta Hawks (rights acquired from New Orleans)	
24	Nique Clifford	July 3	Sacramento Kings (rights acquired from Oklahoma City)	
25	Jase Richardson	July 3	Orlando Magic	
26	Ben Saraf	July 3	Brooklyn Nets	
27	Danny Wolf	July 3	Brooklyn Nets	
28	Hugo González	July 1	Boston Celtics	
29	Liam McNeeley	July 3	Charlotte Hornets (rights acquired from Phoenix)	
30	Yanic Konan Niederhäuser	July 7	Los Angeles Clippers	

=== Second round ===
Pick	Player	Date signed	Team	Ref
31	Rasheer Fleming	July 7	Phoenix Suns (rights acquired from Minnesota)	
32	Noah Penda	July 4	Orlando Magic (rights acquired from Boston)	
33	Sion James	July 3	Charlotte Hornets	
34	Ryan Kalkbrenner	July 3	Charlotte Hornets	
35	Johni Broome	July 1	Philadelphia 76ers	
36	Adou Thiero	July 6	Los Angeles Lakers (rights acquired from Brooklyn)	
37	Chaz Lanier	July 7	Detroit Pistons	
38	Kam Jones	July 8	Indiana Pacers (rights acquired from San Antonio)	
39	Alijah Martin	July 10	Toronto Raptors	
40	Micah Peavy	July 6	New Orleans Pelicans (rights acquired from Washington)	
41	Koby Brea	July 7	Phoenix Suns (rights acquired from Golden State)	
42	Maxime Raynaud	July 2	Sacramento Kings	
43	Jamir Watkins	July 6	Washington Wizards (rights acquired from Utah)	
44	Brooks Barnhizer	July 3	Oklahoma City Thunder	
45	Rocco Zikarsky	July 9	Minnesota Timberwolves (rights acquired from Chicago)	
46	Amari Williams	August 15	Boston Celtics (rights acquired from Orlando)	
47	Bogoljub Marković	—	Milwaukee Bucks	
48	Javon Small	July 10	Memphis Grizzlies	
49	Tyrese Proctor	July 1	Cleveland Cavaliers	
50	Kobe Sanders	July 10	Los Angeles Clippers (rights acquired from New York)	
51	Mohamed Diawara	September 15	New York Knicks (rights acquired from LA Clippers)	
52	Alex Toohey	September 29	Golden State Warriors (rights acquired from Phoenix)	
53	John Tonje	August 26	Utah Jazz	
54	Taelon Peter	July 24	Indiana Pacers	
55	Lachlan Olbrich	July 3	Chicago Bulls (rights acquired from LA Lakers)	
New York Knicks (forfeited) (Note: The New York Knicks were deemed guilty by the league of discussing free agency signing with Jalen Brunson before free agency opened in 2022, resulting in a forced forfeit of their 2025 second-round pick.)
56	Will Richard	September 29	Golden State Warriors (rights acquired from Memphis)	
57	Max Shulga	July 30	Boston Celtics (rights acquired from Orlando)	
58	Saliou Niang	—	Cleveland Cavaliers	
59	Jahmai Mashack	November 16	Memphis Grizzlies (rights acquired from Houston)	

=== Previous years' draftees ===
Draft	Pick	Player	Date signed	Team	Previous team	Ref
2024	43	Nikola Đurišić	July 11	Atlanta Hawks	College Park Skyhawks (NBA G League)	
