= Daeqwon Plowden =

American basketball player (born 1998)

No. 29 – Sacramento Kings
- Position: Shooting guard / small forward
- League: NBA

Personal information
- Born: August 29, 1998 (age 28) Philadelphia, Pennsylvania, U.S.
- Listed height: 6 ft 4 in (1.93 m)
- Listed weight: 216 lb (98 kg)

Career information
- High school: Mastery Charter North (Philadelphia, Pennsylvania)
- College: Bowling Green (2017–2022)
- NBA draft: 2022: undrafted
- Playing career: 2022–present

Career history
- 2022–2023: Birmingham Squadron
- 2023–2024: Osceola Magic
- 2024: College Park Skyhawks
- 2024–2025: Atlanta Hawks
- 2024–2025: →College Park Skyhawks
- 2025–present: Sacramento Kings
- 2025–2026: →Stockton Kings

Career highlights
- Second-team All-MAC (2020); 2× Third-team All-MAC (2021, 2022); MAC All-Defensive team (2022)
- Stats at NBA.com
- Stats at Basketball Reference

Daeqwon Rayshawn Plowden (born August 29, 1998) is an American professional basketball player for the Sacramento Kings of the National Basketball Association (NBA). He played college basketball for the Bowling Green Falcons.

== High school career ==
Plowden is a native of Germantown, Philadelphia, and attended Mastery Charter North School. He was the school's first 1,000-point scorer and was a two-time all-state team selection. Plowden played primarily as a forward and center in high school; he credits his team's coaches, Terrence Cook and Gerald Johnson, for teaching him combined big man and guard skills.

On November 9, 2016, Plowden signed his National Letter of Intent to play for the Bowling Green Falcons. ESPN ranked him as the 20th best player in Pennsylvania in his recruiting class.

== College career ==
Plowden was named to the All-Mid-American Conference (MAC) second-team in 2020 and the third-team in 2021 and 2022. He was selected to the MAC All-Defensive team in 2022.

Plowden finished his career with the Falcons with 1,618 points and 935 rebounds. He did not miss a game during his college career and is the program leader in games played with 154.

== Professional career ==
=== Birmingham Squadron (2022–2023) ===
Plowden worked out with the Washington Wizards, New Orleans Pelicans and Utah Jazz prior to the 2022 NBA draft but went undrafted. He joined the Pelicans for the 2022 NBA Summer League and averaged 12 points per game. On September 9, 2022, Plowden signed with the Pelicans, but was waived on October 15. On November 4, 2022, Plowden was named to the opening night roster for the Birmingham Squadron.

Plowden joined the Oklahoma City Thunder for the 2023 NBA Summer League.

=== Osceola Magic (2023–2024) ===
On September 7, 2023, Plowden's rights were traded to the Osceola Magic and on October 18, he signed with the Orlando Magic. However, he was waived on October 21 and on November 2, he joined Osceola.

On July 16, 2024, Plowden signed a two-way contract with the Golden State Warriors, but was waived on September 24.

=== Atlanta Hawks / College Park Skyhawks (2024–2025) ===
On September 27, 2024, Plowden signed with the Atlanta Hawks, but was waived on October 18. Eight days later, he joined the College Park Skyhawks and on December 27, he signed a two-way contract with the Hawks. On January 15, 2025, Plowden made his NBA debut where he made his first seven field goal attempts and finished the game with 19 points in a 110–94 victory over the Chicago Bulls.

On July 6, 2025, Plowden was traded to the Phoenix Suns as part of a seven-team trade; but was subsequently waived by the team.

=== Sacramento / Stockton Kings (2025–present) ===
On July 30, 2025, Plowden signed a two-way contract with the Sacramento Kings. On March 19, 2026, Plowden recorded a career-high 20 points paired with two rebounds and one assist in a 139–118 loss to the Philadelphia 76ers. He made 32 appearances (including seven starts) for Sacramento during the 2025–26 NBA season, recording averages of 10.8 points, 3.0 rebounds, and 1.3 assists.

On July 3, 2026, Plowden re-signed with the Kings on a two-year, $5.1 million contract.

== Career statistics ==
=== NBA ===
Year	Team	GP	GS	MPG	FG%	3P%	FT%	RPG	APG	SPG	BPG	PPG
2024–25	Atlanta	6	0	12.0	.640	.529	1.000	1.8	.3	.0	.0	7.2
2025–26	Sacramento	32	7	26.4	.430	.333	.857	3.0	1.3	.7	.2	10.8
Career		38	11	24.1	.447	.350	.863	2.8	1.1	.6	.2	10.2

=== College ===
Year	Team	GP	GS	MPG	FG%	3P%	FT%	RPG	APG	SPG	BPG	PPG
2017–18	Bowling Green	32	1	15.1	.422	.265	.515	2.9	.4	.4	.4	4.8
2018–19	Bowling Green	34	25	21.6	.462	.379	.545	4.8	.4	.6	.9	6.9
2019–20	Bowling Green	31	30	31.4	.476	.347	.851	8.5	.8	.9	.7	12.7
2020–21	Bowling Green	26	26	30.0	.444	.356	.727	7.8	1.2	.9	.9	13.4
2021–22	Bowling Green	31	31	30.6	.414	.356	.792	6.8	1.1	.9	1.2	15.7
Career		154	113	25.4	.443	.346	.732	6.1	.8	.7	.8	10.5
