= Jalen Crutcher =

American basketball player (born 1999)

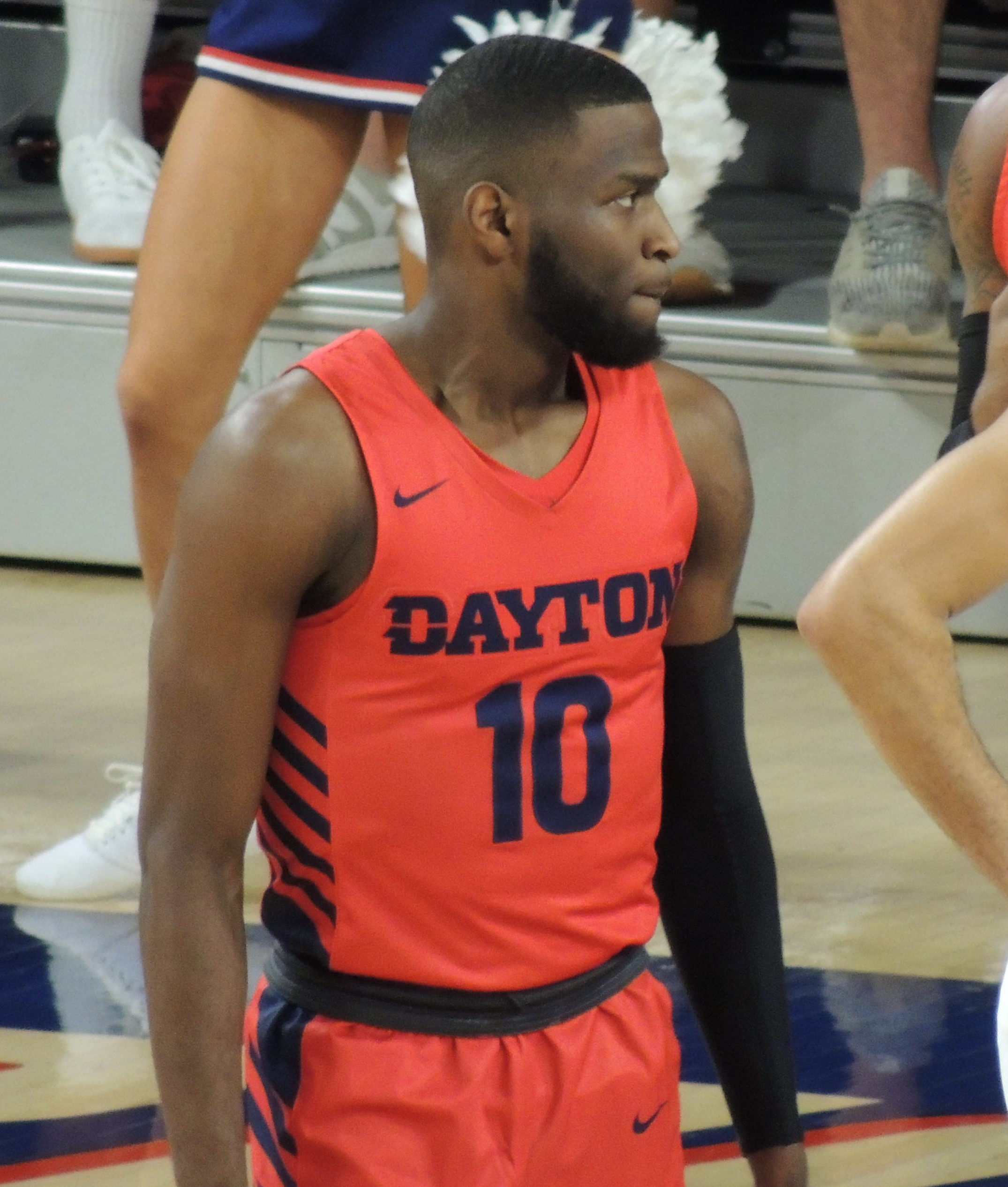
- Crutcher with Dayton in 2020

No. 4 – Iowa Wolves
- Position: Point guard
- League: NBA G League

Personal information
- Born: July 18, 1999 (age 27) Memphis, Tennessee, U.S.
- Listed height: 6 ft 1 in (1.85 m)
- Listed weight: 175 lb (79 kg)

Career information
- High school: Ridgeway (Memphis, Tennessee)
- College: Dayton (2017–2021)
- NBA draft: 2021: undrafted
- Playing career: 2021–present

Career history
- 2021–2023: Greensboro Swarm
- 2023–2024: Birmingham Squadron
- 2024: New Orleans Pelicans
- 2024: →Birmingham Squadron
- 2024–2025: Birmingham Squadron
- 2025: Osceola Magic
- 2025–present: Iowa Wolves
- 2026: Leones de Ponce

Career highlights
- 2× First-team All-Atlantic 10 (2020, 2021); Third-team All-Atlantic 10 (2019); Atlantic 10 All-Rookie Team (2018)
- Stats at NBA.com
- Stats at Basketball Reference

Jalen Crutcher (born July 18, 1999) is an American professional basketball player for the Iowa Wolves of the NBA G League. He played college basketball for the Dayton Flyers.

== Early life and high school career ==
Crutcher is the son of Greg and Sheila Crutcher and grew up in Memphis, Tennessee. He attended Ridgeway High School. Crutcher averaged 18 points, four assists, and two steals per game as a senior. He was a three-star recruit ranked the 65th best point guard in his class. Crutcher initially committed to Chattanooga but decommitted after coach Matt McCall left to coach UMass. Crutcher signed with Dayton after coach Anthony Grant needed a point guard at the last minute. Crutcher was also recruited by Murray State.

== College career ==
As a freshman, Crutcher started 22 games and averaged 9.2 points, 3.1 rebounds, and 4.4 assists per game on a team that finished 14–17. Crutcher was named to the Atlantic 10 All-Rookie Team. As a sophomore, Crutcher was third on the team in scoring with 13.2 points per game and second in the Atlantic 10 in assists with 5.7 per game, in addition to his four rebounds per game. Crutcher helped the team finish with a 21–12 record and reach the NIT semifinals and he was named team MVP. He was also named to the Third Team All-Atlantic 10.

Crutcher hit a three-pointer with seconds left against Kansas in the final of the 2019 Maui Invitational Tournament to force overtime. He scored 12 points total in the 90–84 overtime loss. Crutcher missed a game against Grambling State on December 23 with a concussion. On January 17, 2020, Crutcher scored 21 points and hit the game-winning three-pointer at the buzzer to defeat Saint Louis 78–76 in overtime. Crutcher scored a career-high 24 points and also had eight rebounds and seven assists on January 25, in a 87–79 win over Richmond. He became the first Dayton player to be named Atlantic 10 player of the week on back-to-back weeks on January 27. On January 30, he had 18 points in a 73–69 win against Duquesne and surpassed the 1,000 point threshold. At the end of the regular season Crutcher was named to the First Team All-Atlantic 10. Crutcher led Dayton in minutes per game (33.6), assists per game (4.9) three-pointers (21.4 per game), three-point percentage (.468, 147–314) and free throw percentage (.869, 86–99), and was second to roommate Obi Toppin in scoring (15.1 points per game). After the season, Crutcher declared for the 2020 NBA draft while maintaining his college eligibility. On August 2, he announced he was withdrawing from the draft and returning to Dayton for his senior season.

At the end of the regular season, Crutcher repeated on the First Team All-Atlantic 10. As a senior, Crutcher averaged 17.6 points and 4.8 assists per game. He announced that he was declaring for the 2021 NBA draft and hired an agent, forgoing the extra season of eligibility the NCAA granted basketball players. Crutcher finishing 16th in career scoring with 1,593 points, fourth in made three-pointers with 242, and second in assists with 584.

== Professional career ==
=== Greensboro Swarm (2021–2023) ===
After going undrafted in the 2021 NBA draft, Crutcher joined the Milwaukee Bucks for the 2021 NBA Summer League. On October 8, 2021, he signed with the Charlotte Hornets, but was waived six days later. On October 24, he signed with the Greensboro Swarm as an affiliate player.

=== New Orleans Pelicans / Birmingham Squadron (2023–2024) ===
On September 8, 2023, Crutcher's rights were traded to the Birmingham Squadron and on October 12, he signed with the New Orleans Pelicans. However, he was waived on October 22 and, seven days later, he signed with Birmingham.

On February 22, 2024, Crutcher signed a 10-day contract with the Pelicans, making his NBA debut on February 27 before returning to Birmingham on March 3.

On September 25, 2024, Crutcher re-signed with the Pelicans, but was waived on October 14. On October 28, he rejoined the Squadron. On February 26, 2025, the Pelicans signed Crutcher to a two-way contract. However, he didn’t appear for the team prior to being waived on March 1.

=== Iowa Wolves (2025–present) ===
On September 22, 2026, Crutcher signed a training camp contract with the Minnesota Timberwolves, but was waived the same day.

== Career statistics ==
Legend
GP	Games played	GS	Games started	MPG	Minutes per game
FG%	Field goal percentage	3P%	3-point field goal percentage	FT%	Free throw percentage
RPG	Rebounds per game	APG	Assists per game	SPG	Steals per game
BPG	Blocks per game	PPG	Points per game	**Bold**	Career high

=== NBA ===
Year	Team	GP	GS	MPG	FG%	3P%	FT%	RPG	APG	SPG	BPG	PPG
2023–24	New Orleans	1	0	2.7	.000	—	—	.0	.0	.0	.0	.0
Career		1	0	2.7	.000	—	—	.0	.0	.0	.0	.0

=== College ===
Year	Team	GP	GS	MPG	FG%	3P%	FT%	RPG	APG	SPG	BPG	PPG
2017–18	Dayton	31	22	31.2	.412	.338	.681	3.1	4.4	**1.0**	**.1**	9.2
2018–19	Dayton	**33**	**32**	36.5	.419	.363	.707	**4.0**	**5.7**	.9	**.1**	13.2
2019–20	Dayton	30	30	33.6	**.468**	**.424**	**.869**	3.2	4.9	.8	**.1**	15.1
2020–21	Dayton	24	24	**38.1**	.463	.372	.763	3.5	4.8	.8	.0	**17.6**
Career		118	108	34.7	.441	.375	.769	3.5	4.9	.9	.1	13.5
