= Malik Dia =

American basketball player (born 2004)

No. 8 – New Orleans Pelicans
- Position: Power forward
- League: NBA

Personal information
- Born: February 4, 2004 (age 22) Murfreesboro, Tennessee, U.S.
- Listed height: 6 ft 9 in (2.06 m)
- Listed weight: 256 lb (116 kg)

Career information
- High school: The Ensworth School (Nashville, Tennessee)
- College: Vanderbilt (2022–2023); Belmont (2023–2024); Ole Miss (2024–2026)
- NBA draft: 2026: undrafted
- Playing career: 2026–present

Career history
- 2026–present: New Orleans Pelicans
- 2026–present: →Laketown Squadron
- Stats at NBA.com
- Stats at Basketball Reference

Malik Dia (born February 4, 2004) is an American professional basketball player for the New Orleans Pelicans of the National Basketball Association (NBA), on a two-way contract with the Laketown Squadron of the NBA G League. He played college basketball for the Belmont Bruins, Vanderbilt Commodores, and Ole Miss Rebels.

== Early life and high school ==
Coming out of high school, Dia committed to play college basketball for the Vanderbilt Commodores over offers from schools such as Loyola-Chicago, Georgia, Marquette, Murray State and Western Kentucky.

== College career ==
In 2022–23, Dia played 20 games for the Commodores where he averaged 2.6 points and 1.6 rebounds per game. After the season, he entered his name into the NCAA transfer portal.

Dia transferred to play for the Belmont Bruins. In 2023–24, he appeared in 33 games with 24 starts, where he averaged 16.9 points and 5.8 rebounds per game for the Bruins. After the season, Dia once again entered his name into the NCAA transfer portal.

Dia transferred to play for the Ole Miss Rebels. On January 8, 2025, he recorded 21 points and eight rebounds in a victory over Arkansas. On January 11, Dia tallied 19 points, seven rebounds and an assist in a win over LSU. On January 14, he totaled 23 points and 19 rebounds in an upset win over Alabama. On February 12, Dia scored 12 straight points for the Rebels as he helped Ole Miss to a comeback win over South Carolina. On February 22, he tallied 22 points in a loss to Vanderbilt.

== Professional career ==
After going undrafted in the 2026 NBA draft, Dia signed with the New Orleans Pelicans for the 2026 NBA Summer League. On August 18, 2026, Dia signed a two-way contract with the Pelicans, splitting time with their NBA G League affiliate, the Laketown Squadron.
