= Jalon Moore =

American basketball player (born 2003)

No. 5 – Laketown Squadron
- Position: Small forward
- League: NBA G League

Personal information
- Born: April 10, 2003 (age 23) Birmingham, Alabama, U.S.
- Listed height: 6 ft 7 in (2.01 m)
- Listed weight: 215 lb (98 kg)

Career information
- High school: Gardendale (Gardendale, Alabama)
- College: Georgia Tech (2021–2023); Oklahoma (2023–2025)
- NBA draft: 2025: undrafted
- Playing career: 2025–present

Career history
- 2025–present: Birmingham/Laketown Squadron
- Stats at NBA.com
- Stats at Basketball Reference

Jalon Moore (born April 10, 2003) is an American professional basketball player for the Laketown Squadron of the NBA G League. He played college basketball for the Oklahoma Sooners of the Southeastern Conference, and the Georgia Tech Yellow Jackets.

== Early life and high school ==
Coming out of high school, Moore was rated as a three-star recruit and committed to play college basketball for the Georgia Tech Yellow Jackets.

== College career ==
=== Georgia Tech ===
As a freshman in 2021-2022, Moore scored 37 points in 13 games. On December 2, 2022, he scored 16 points and grabbed nine rebounds in a win over Northeastern. During the 2022-23 season, Moore appeared in 32 games where he made 15 starts, averaging 7.6 points, and 4.7 rebounds per game. After the season, Moore entered his name into the NCAA transfer portal.

=== Oklahoma ===
Moore transferred to play for the Oklahoma Sooners. On December 31, 2023, he dropped 21 points in a win over Monmouth. During the 2023-24 season, Moore averaged 11.2 points, 6.7 rebounds, and 1.0 block per game in 31 starts. After the season, he declared for the 2024 NBA draft, but later withdrew his name and returned to the Sooners for the 2024-25 season. On November 16, 2024, Moore tallied 21 points and five rebounds in an win over Stetson. On February 1, 2025, he put up 19 points, four rebounds, one assist, one steal and one block in a win over #24 Vanderbilt.

== Professional career ==
A prospect for the 2025 NBA draft, Moore suffered a torn Achilles tendon during a pre-draft workout with the San Antonio Spurs on June 21, 2025. Despite the injury, Moore signed a training camp contract with the New Orleans Pelicans on September 16; he was waived by the team the next day, allowing them to retain his G League rights.
