= Javonte Cooke =

American basketball player (born 1999)

No. 15 – Beijing Royal Fighters
- Position: Point guard
- League: CBA

Personal information
- Born: July 11, 1999 (age 27) Columbia, South Carolina, U.S.
- Listed height: 6 ft 6 in (1.98 m)
- Listed weight: 185 lb (84 kg)

Career information
- High school: Covenant Classical (Columbia, South Carolina)
- College: Mars Hill (2018–2021); Winston Salem State (2021–2022)
- NBA draft: 2023: undrafted
- Playing career: 2022–present

Career history
- 2022–2024: Iowa Wolves
- 2024: Brampton Honey Badgers
- 2024–2025: Oklahoma City Blue
- 2025–2026: Portland Trail Blazers
- 2025–2026: →Rip City Remix
- 2026–present: Beijing Royal Fighters

Career highlights
- First-team All-CIAA (2022)
- Stats at NBA.com
- Stats at Basketball Reference

Javonte Cooke (born July 11, 1999) is an American professional basketball player for the Beijing Royal Fighters of the Chinese Basketball Association (CBA). He played college basketball for the Mars Hill Lions and Winston-Salem State Rams.

== High school career ==
Cooke graduated from Covenant Classical School in Columbia, South Carolina. As a senior, he averaged 23 points, 9 rebounds 4.5 steals and 3.5 assists per game. He earned SCISA A Player of the Year. He was Most Outstanding Player in the Georgia vs. South Carolina All Star Game.

== College career ==
Cooke enrolled at the University of South Carolina Aiken, but only redshirted as a freshman before transferring.

=== Mars Hill University ===
Cooke played for Mars Hill from 2018 to 2021. He played in 47 games during his time at the school and made 27 starts. He averaged 14 points and 5.7 rebounds in two seasons. He reached double figures scoring in 34 games, with nine games over 20 points during the 2019–2020 season.

On November 4, 2020, Cooke was selected to the preseason All-South Atlantic Conference Second Team.

=== Winston-Salem State ===
Cooke joined Winston-Salem State in the Fall of 2021. He played in 23 games for the team and helped them claim the CIAA Southern Division title. He averaged 17.5 points, 3.9 rebounds 1.5 assists and 1.8 steals per game. He finished the season fifth in the conference in scoring, sixth in field goal percentage and first in 3-point field goal percentage and 3-point field goals per game. He was named HBCU Player of the Week and CIAA Player of the Week at least once during the season as well as BOXTOROW National Player of the Week. Cooke was named to the All-CIAA Backcourt Team and CIAA All-Tournament Team. He scored 1,220 points during his career.

In March 2022, Cooke received an invitation to participate in the HBCU All-Star basketball game.

== Professional career ==
=== Iowa Wolves (2022–2024) ===
On October 25, 2022, Cooke signed, after a tryout, with the Iowa Wolves as a prospect.

After going undrafted in the 2023 NBA draft, Cooke joined the Minnesota Timberwolves for the 2023 NBA Summer League and on October 21, 2023, he signed with the team, but was waived the same day. On October 29, he rejoined Iowa.

=== Brampton Honey Badgers (2024) ===
On May 10, 2024, Cooke signed with the Brampton Honey Badgers of the Canadian Elite Basketball League, but waived him on June 29, in the aftermath of their latest loss against Scarborough.

=== Oklahoma City Blue (2024–2025) ===
After joining the Minnesota Timberwolves for the 2024 NBA Summer League, Cooke signed with the Oklahoma City Thunder on October 11, 2024. However, he was waived the next day and on October 25, he joined the Oklahoma City Blue.

=== Portland Trail Blazers / Rip City Remix (2025–2026) ===
On October 20, 2025, Cooke signed a two-way contract with the Portland Trail Blazers. On November 20, Cooke made his NBA regular season debut, putting up four points, one assist, and one steal in a 122–121 loss to the Chicago Bulls. He made 19 appearances for Portland during his rookie campaign, recording averages of 1.2 points, 1.0 rebound, and 0.4 assists. Cooke was waived by the Trail Blazers on March 2, 2026.

=== Beijing Royal Fighters (2026–present) ===
On August 21, 2026, Cooke signed with the Beijing Royal Fighters of the Chinese Basketball Association.

== Career statistics ==
Legend
GP	Games played	GS	Games started	MPG	Minutes per game
FG%	Field goal percentage	3P%	3-point field goal percentage	FT%	Free throw percentage
RPG	Rebounds per game	APG	Assists per game	SPG	Steals per game
BPG	Blocks per game	PPG	Points per game	**Bold**	Career high

=== NBA ===
Year	Team	GP	GS	MPG	FG%	3P%	FT%	RPG	APG	SPG	BPG	PPG
2025–26	Portland	19	0	4.9	.220	.130	1.000	1.0	.4	.3	.0	1.2
Career		19	0	4.9	.220	.130	1.000	1.0	.4	.3	.0	1.2

== Personal life ==
Cooke is the son of Jermaine and Valerie Cooke. He has two older siblings, Acqwon and Keyona.
