= Gabe McGlothan =

American basketball player (born 1999)

No. 30 – Maine Celtics
- Position: Power forward
- League: NBA G League

Personal information
- Born: March 3, 1999 (age 27) Gilbert, Arizona, U.S.
- Listed height: 6 ft 6 in (1.98 m)
- Listed weight: 235 lb (107 kg)

Career information
- High school: Basha (Chandler, Arizona); Putnam Science Academy (Putnam, Connecticut)
- College: Southeast Missouri State (2018–2019); Grand Canyon (2019–2024)
- NBA draft: 2024: undrafted
- Playing career: 2024–present

Career history
- 2024–2025: Grand Rapids Gold
- 2025–2026: Noblesville Boom
- 2026–present: Maine Celtics

Career highlights
- First-team All-WAC (2024); Second-team All-WAC (2023)
- Stats at NBA.com
- Stats at Basketball Reference

Gabriel Alexander McGlothan (born March 3, 1999) is an American professional basketball player for the Maine Celtics of the NBA G League. He played college basketball for the Southeast Missouri State Redhawks and Grand Canyon Antelopes.

== High school career ==
McGlothan initially attended Basha High School at Chandler, Arizona, where he averaged 11.1 points and 8.2 rebounds in 2015–16 and improved to 14.2 points and 9.4 rebounds in 2016–17, helping his team win the state title inside GCU Arena.

Later, McGlothan transferred to Putnam Science Academy in Putnam, Connecticut, where he played 42 games and scored double figures eight times, helping his team win the 2017–18 National Prep Championship.

== College career ==
McGlothan began his college career with the Southeast Missouri State Redhawks, starting 11 of the final 12 games of his freshman season while shooting 55.1 percent from the field in his final nine games.

McGlothan then transferred to the Grand Canyon Antelopes, where he redshirted his first season and played the next four seasons under head coach Bryce Drew, helping the team compile a cumulative 94–32 record and three NCAA tournament trips. In his final season, he averaged 12.8 points, 7.3 rebounds, 1.3 steals and 0.9 blocks with 40% 3-point shooting, helping the Antelopes to a 30–5 mark and their first NCAA Division I tournament victory. When the season ended, he was one of 15 active Division I players with at least 1,500 points and 1,000 rebounds in his career.

McGlothan finished his collegiate career with averages of 10.0 points and 6.7 rebounds in 25.9 minutes while winning 2024 State Farm College Slam Dunk contest.

== Professional career ==
After going undrafted in the 2024 NBA draft, McGlothan joined the Denver Nuggets for the 2024 NBA Summer League and on July 31, 2024, he signed with them. However, he was waived on October 8 and on October 28, he joined the Grand Rapids Gold.

On August 1, 2025, McGlothan was traded to the Noblesville Boom in a three–team trade. On October 18, McGlothan was waived by the Pacers. On November 4, McGlothan played in the Boom's first scrimmage. The next day, the Boom announced McGlothan would be on the 2025-2026 roster. On December 16, 2025, McGlothan signed a 10-day contract with the Indiana Pacers of the National Basketball Association, via a hardship exception; however, was waived on December 20. On February 28, 2026, it was announced that McGlothan would miss the remainder of the season due to multiple rib fractures suffered in a game on February 22.

== Personal life ==
The son of Kevin McGlothan and Janelle Danley, he has a brother. He majored in mechanical engineering.
