= David Muoka =

Hong Kong basketball player (born 2000)

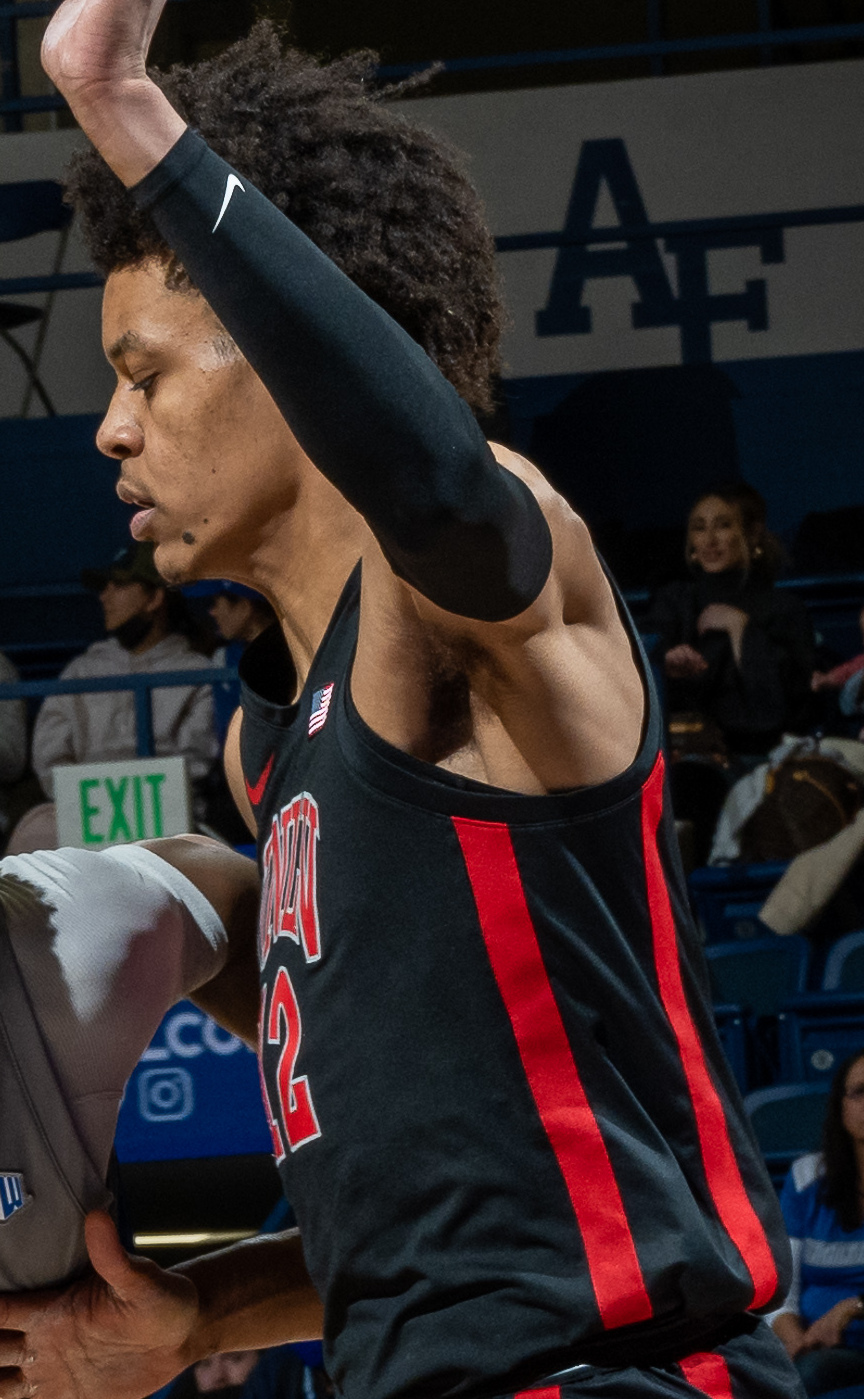
- Muoka with UNLV in 2022

No. 15 – Stockton Kings
- Position: Center
- League: NBA G League

Personal information
- Born: 14 December 2000 (age 25) Hong Kong
- Listed height: 6 ft 10 in (2.08 m)
- Listed weight: 235 lb (107 kg)

Career information
- High school: West Island (Hong Kong); Athlete Institute (Mono, Canada)
- College: Lamar (2019–2021); UNLV (2021–2023)
- NBA draft: 2024: undrafted
- Playing career: 2023–present

Career history
- 2023–2024: Long Island Nets
- 2024–2025: Windy City Bulls
- 2025–2026: Long Island Nets
- 2026–present: Stockton Kings

Career highlights
- SLC Defensive Player of the Year (2021); SLC All-Defensive team (2021)
- Stats at NBA.com
- Stats at Basketball Reference

David Kenechukwu Muoka (born 14 December 2000) is a Hong Kong professional basketball player for the Stockton Kings of the NBA G League. He played college basketball for the Lamar Cardinals and the UNLV Runnin' Rebels.

== High school career ==
Muoka initially attended West Island School in his native Hong Kong where he played in local competitions, before moving abroad and attending the Athlete Institute in Mono, Ontario, where he averaged 10.9 points, 11.8 rebounds and 3.1 blocks per game while leading the league in rebounds and blocks. By the end of the year, he was nominated for the Defensive Player of the Year award by the Ontario Scholastic Basketball Association (OSBA).

== College career ==
Muoka began his college career with the Lamar Cardinals where he played 25 games as a sophomore and averaged 5.4 points while shooting 51.3% from the field, 6.8 rebounds and 2.9 blocks, which led the SLC, in 26.7 minutes. His efforts earned him the Defensive Player of the Year award.

Afterwards, Muoka transferred to the UNLV Runnin' Rebels where he started 24 of 32 games as a senior and averaged 4.6 points, 4.7 rebounds and 1.4 blocks.

== Professional career ==
=== Long Island Nets (2023–2024) ===
After forgoing his super-senior season, Muoka was selected 3rd overall in the 2020 NBA G League draft by the Capital City Go-Go, but was waived on 9 November 2023. Four days later, he joined the Long Island Nets where he played in 38 games and averaged 4.6 points, 4.8 rebounds and 1.3 blocks in 14.7 minutes.

=== Windy City Bulls (2024–2025) ===
After going undrafted in the 2024 NBA draft, Muoka joined the Brooklyn Nets for the 2024 NBA Summer League and on 1 October 2024, he signed with the Portland Trail Blazers, becoming the first Hong Konger to ink an NBA deal, before being waived the same day. On 28 October, he joined the Rip City Remix before being traded to the Windy City Bulls on 5 November.

=== Second stint with Long Island Nets (2025–2026) ===
On 15 September 2025, Muoka signed with the Brooklyn Nets; however, he was waived the next day following the acquisition of Kobe Bufkin.

== Personal life ==
The son of Jonathan Muoka and Allison Bate, he has one brother. He is of Nigerian and British descent and majored in Economics.
