= Laketown Squadron =

American professional basketball team of the NBA G League

- League: NBA G League
- Founded: 2019
- History: Erie BayHawks; 2019–2021; Birmingham Squadron; 2021–2026; Laketown Squadron; 2026–present
- Arena: Pontchartrain Center
- Location: Kenner, Louisiana
- Team colors: Red, navy blue, gold
- Head coach: Brandon Demas
- Affiliation: New Orleans Pelicans
- Website: laketown.gleague.nba.com

The Laketown Squadron are an American professional basketball team in the NBA G League based in Kenner, Louisiana. They are affiliated with the New Orleans Pelicans, and play their home games at the Pontchartrain Center. The team began play in 2019 in Erie, Pennsylvania as the Erie BayHawks before moving to Birmingham in 2021 where they played as the Birmingham Squadron for five seasons. Following the 2025−26 season, the Squadron relocated from Birmingham to Kenner.

== History ==
=== Creation ===
On March 30, 2017, the New Orleans Pelicans announced their intentions to have an owned-and-operated NBA G League team by the 2018–19 season located in the Gulf South region. The organization then announced they were looking at 11 different cities across Alabama, Florida, Louisiana, and Mississippi. By August 2017, the list had narrowed to two: Pensacola and Shreveport. After the city council in Shreveport unanimously voted against building a new arena in September 2017, the Pelicans' general manager Dell Demps stated they had put their efforts in creating a G League team on hold, saying that "[finding] the right situation, and the right city for the team to play is essential."

On October 24, 2018, the Pelicans announced plans to place their G League team in Birmingham, Alabama, and begin play at Legacy Arena by 2022. The plan included an extensive $125 million renovation to Legacy Arena. While the renovations were ongoing, the Pelicans' affiliate began play for the 2019–20 season as the Erie BayHawks after the Atlanta Hawks relocated their G League affiliate from Erie, Pennsylvania, to College Park, Georgia. In March 2021, the Pelicans hired David Lane as the team's general manager with the intent on relocating the team in time for the 2021–22 season.

=== 2019–2021: Erie BayHawks ===
The Erie BayHawks became the New Orleans Pelicans' affiliate in the 2019–20 season. Ryan Pannone, an assistant on the Pelicans' Summer League staff, was named the head coach of the BayHawks in August 2019. He led the BayHawks to a 13–30 record in his first season, but the season was cancelled prematurely due to the COVID-19 pandemic. The BayHawks played a shortened, 18-team season at the ESPN Wide World of Sports Complex in 2021 where they made the playoffs, losing to the Lakeland Magic in the quarterfinals 139–110.

On April 8, 2021, Erie Basketball Management, LLC, the local management company that operated all three franchises as the Erie BayHawks teams, announced that the organization was unable to find another NBA partner team for 2021–22 and ceased operations. Long-time BayHawks president Matt Bresee was honored with the Team Executive of the Year Award that summer, in recognition of his work in Erie.

=== 2021–2026: Birmingham Squadron ===
Following the completion of renovations to Legacy Arena, the franchise moved to Birmingham and officially became the Birmingham Squadron in 2021. The Squadron played their first home game in Birmingham on December 5, 2021, against the Mexico City Capitanes in front of nearly 5,000 fans, where they lost 123–114. The Squadron made the playoffs, falling to the Texas Legends at home in the first round 115–100. The Squadron finished their inaugural season in Birmingham ranked second in league attendance.

Following his first season in Birmingham, Ryan Pannone was asked to join Pelicans head coach Willie Green's staff in New Orleans full-time as an assistant. Alongside the announcement of Pannone's move, the Pelicans announced that Squadron assistant T.J. Saint was being promoted to head coach. In his first season, the Squadron finished with an 11–21 record in the regular season, 12th place in the Western Conference, and failed to reach the playoffs.

=== 2026–: Laketown Squadron ===
In February 2026, the Pelicans announced they were relocating the Squadron from Birmingham to the New Orleans suburb of Kenner, Louisiana. The team announced that it will retain the Squadron nickname in March 2026, and will be known as the Laketown Squadron. The team will play at the Pontchartrain Center in Kenner.

On June 15, 2026, the team announced that Brandon Demas had been named as the new head coach. Demas had previously been an assistance coach with the New Orleans Pelicans.

== Name, logo, and uniforms ==
On July 26, 2021, the Birmingham Squadron name, logo, and colors were revealed, with the name "Squadron" being chosen as both a reference to a collective noun used for a group of pelicans and to Alabama's history in military aviation such as the Tuskegee Airmen of the 99th Pursuit Squadron. The Squadron logo is a star reminiscent of the Birmingham flag, and incorporates elements of the cultures and histories of both Birmingham and New Orleans. The team typically wears red uniforms at home and white on the road. At the start of the 2023–24 season, the Squadron announced a partnership with Pearl River Resort to display its logo on the Squadron's home jerseys.

== Season by season ==
=== Tip–Off Tournament ===
Season	Division	Finish	Wins	Losses	Pct.	Winter Showcase
Birmingham Squadron
2021	South	2nd	7	5	.583	
2022	South	6th	6	12	.333	
2023	South	T–1st	8	6	.571	
2024	South	6th	4	7	.364	
Tip–Off Tournament			25	30	.455	

=== Regular season ===
Season	Conference	Finish	Wins	Losses	Pct.	Postseason
Erie BayHawks
2019–20	Eastern	4th	13	30	.302	Season cancelled by COVID-19 pandemic
2020–21	—	3rd	11	4	.733	Lost Quarterfinal (Lakeland) 110–139
Birmingham Squadron
2021–22	Western	4th	18	14	.563	Lost Conference Quarterfinal (Texas) 100–115
2022–23	Western	12th	11	21	.344	
2023–24	Eastern	T–10th	15	19	.441	
2024–25	Eastern	15th	12	22	.353	
Regular season			80	110	.421	
Playoffs			0	2	.000	

== Head coaches ==
#	Head coach	Term	Regular season				Playoffs				Achievements
#	Head coach	Term	G	W	L	Win%	G	W	L	Win%	Achievements
1	Ryan Pannone	2019–2022	90	42	48	.467	2	0	2	.000	
2	T.J. Saint	2022–2025	66	26	40	.394	0	0	0	–	
3	Joe Barrer	2025–2026	0	0	0	–	0	0	0	–	
4	Brandon Demas	2026–present	0	0	0	–	0	0	0	–	

== Current roster ==
Laketown Squadron roster
Players

Pos.	No.	Player	Height	Weight	DOB	From
C	55	Aziz Bandaogo	7 ft 0 in (2.13 m)	235 lb (107 kg)	2001-01-18	Cincinnati
F	5	Chris Bell	6 ft 7 in (2.01 m)	195 lb (88 kg)	2003-02-16	California
G	11	Dominique Daniels Jr.	5 ft 10 in (1.78 m)	180 lb (82 kg)	2002-10-24	Cal Baptist
F	8	Malik Dia (TW)	6 ft 9 in (2.06 m)	256 lb (116 kg)		Mississippi
C	1	Hunter Dikinson	7 ft 1 in (2.16 m)	255 lb (116 kg)	2000-11-25	Kansas
F	5	Jalon Moore	6 ft 6 in (1.98 m)	211 lb (96 kg)	2003-04-03	Oklahoma
G	15	Markquis Nowell	5 ft 7 in (1.70 m)	160 lb (73 kg)	1999-12-25	Kansas State
F	2	Johnny O'Neil	6 ft 10 in (2.08 m)	220 lb (100 kg)	2002-04-02	Santa Clara
G	10	Jaron Pierre Jr. (TW)	6 ft 6 in (1.98 m)	206 lb (93 kg)	2002-07-12	SMU
F	13	Julian Reese	6 ft 11 in (2.11 m)	230 lb (104 kg)	2003-06-30	Maryland
F	24	Christian Shumate	7 ft 6 in (2.29 m)	213 lb (97 kg)	2002-07-24	McNeese State
G	18	Ethan Taylor	6 ft 5 in (1.96 m)	205 lb (93 kg)	2002-01-06	Air Force
F	27	Solomon Washington	6 ft 7 in (2.01 m)	225 lb (102 kg)	2003-07-20	Maryland

Coaches
Head coach
- Joe Barrer
Assistant(s)
- Will Bynum
- AJ Carr
- Danté Milligan

Legend
- (DP) Unsigned draft pick
- (FA) Free agent
- (S) Suspended
- (P) Prospects
- (NBA) On assignment from NBA affiliate
- (TW) Two-way affiliate player
- Injured

Roster
Updated: November 09, 2026

== See also ==
- Erie BayHawks (2008–2017)
- Erie BayHawks (2017–2019)
