= List of current NBA G League team rosters =

The following below is a list of current NBA G League rosters.

== Eastern Conference ==
There are a total of 16 teams in the Eastern Conference.

=== Capital City Go-Go ===
Capital City Go-Go roster
Players

Pos.	No.	Player	Height	Weight	DOB	From
G	26	Reece Beekman (TW)	6 ft 3 in (1.91 m)	190 lb (86 kg)	2001-10-08	Virginia
G	00	Trae Hannibal	6 ft 2 in (1.88 m)	220 lb (100 kg)	2001-02-13	LSU
G	2	Nolan Hickman	6 ft 2 in (1.88 m)	190 lb (86 kg)	2003-05-07	Gonzaga
F	7	Chris Livingston	6 ft 6 in (1.98 m)	220 lb (100 kg)	2003-10-15	Kentucky
C	–	Felix Okpara (TW)	6 ft 11 in (2.11 m)	235 lb (107 kg)	2004-04-20	Tennessee
F	5	Jamir Watkins (TW)	6 ft 6 in (1.98 m)	210 lb (95 kg)	2001-07-06	Florida State

Coaches
Head coach
- Cody Toppert
Assistant(s)
- Pete Fusilero
- Ashton Gibbs
- TC Swirsky
- Jason Thompson

Legend
- (DP) Unsigned draft pick
- (FA) Free agent
- (S) Suspended
- (P) Prospects
- (NBA) On assignment from NBA affiliate
- (TW) Two-way affiliate player
- Injured

Roster
Updated: March 4, 2026

=== Cleveland Charge ===
Cleveland Charge roster
Players

Pos.	No.	Player	Height	Weight	DOB	From
F	13	Rashaun Agee	6 ft 7 in (2.01 m)	210 lb (95 kg)	2000-11-02	Texas A&M
G	55	Zack Austin	6 ft 5 in (1.96 m)	215 lb (98 kg)	2001-08-11	Pittsburgh
C	–	Khalifa Diop (NBA)	6 ft 10 in (2.08 m)	231 lb (105 kg)	2002-01-15	Senegal
F	35	Lydell Elmore	6 ft 9 in (2.06 m)	190 lb (86 kg)	1998–01–01	High Point
F	21	Tristan Enaruna (TW)	6 ft 7 in (2.01 m)	220 lb (100 kg)	2001-06-26	Cleveland State
G	5	Curtis Jones	6 ft 3 in (1.91 m)	195 lb (88 kg)	2001-10-04	Iowa State
G	4	Ian Martinez	6 ft 3 in (1.91 m)	185 lb (84 kg)	2001-07-24	Utah State
G	22	Sean McNeil	6 ft 4 in (1.93 m)	205 lb (93 kg)	1998-08-17	Ohio State
F	22	Riley Minix (TW)	6 ft 7 in (2.01 m)	230 lb (104 kg)	2000-09-22	Morehead State
G	33	Marlon Moore Jr.	6 ft 5 in (1.96 m)	205 lb (93 kg)	1997-05-29	West Liberty
F	7	Norchad Omier	6 ft 7 in (2.01 m)	248 lb (112 kg)	2001-08-28	Baylor
G	1	Kadary Richmond	6 ft 6 in (1.98 m)	205 lb (93 kg)	2001-08-25	St. John's
G/F	2	Jaxson Robinson	6 ft 7 in (2.01 m)	192 lb (87 kg)	2002-12-03	Kentucky
F	25	Tre’Von Spillers	6 ft 7 in (2.01 m)	215 lb (98 kg)	2002-10-01	Wake Forest
G	30	Markhi Strickland	6 ft 6 in (1.98 m)	209 lb (95 kg)	2001-05-27	North Dakota State
C	88	Ernest Udeh Jr. (TW)	6 ft 9 in (2.06 m)	266 lb (121 kg)	2004-01-08	Miami (FL)
G	10	C.J. White	6 ft 5 in (1.96 m)	215 lb (98 kg)	2000-06-22	Little Rock
G	31	Noam Yaacov	6 ft 1 in (1.85 m)	190 lb (86 kg)	2004-10-20	Israel

Coaches
Head coach
- Eli Kell-Abrams
Assistant(s)
- Norman Richardson (Associate HC)
- David Pavlakovich
- Corey Wheeler

Legend
- (DP) Unsigned draft pick
- (FA) Free agent
- (S) Suspended
- (P) Prospects
- (NBA) On assignment from NBA affiliate
- (TW) Two-way affiliate player
- Injured

Roster
Updated: October 27, 2026

=== College Park Skyhawks ===
College Park Skyhawks roster
Players

Pos.	No.	Player	Height	Weight	DOB	From
G/F	1	Chandler Baker	6 ft 5 in (1.96 m)	185 lb (84 kg)	2001-11-27	Colgate
G	10	RayJ Dennis (TW)	6 ft 1 in (1.85 m)	180 lb (82 kg)	2001-03-30	Baylor
G	51	Keshon Gilbert (TW)	6 ft 4 in (1.93 m)	200 lb (91 kg)	2003-06-30	Iowa State
C	–	William Baker	6 ft 11 in (2.11 m)	240 lb (109 kg)	2000-12-31	LSU
F	–	Jalen Wilson (TW)	6 ft 6 in (1.98 m)	220 lb (100 kg)	2000-11-04	Kansas

Coaches
Head coach
- Steve Klei
Assistant(s)
- Bryan George
- O'Neil Holder
- Seth Jackson
- Kari Korver
- Enzo Li
- Dustin Ware

Legend
- (DP) Unsigned draft pick
- (FA) Free agent
- (S) Suspended
- (P) Prospects
- (NBA) On assignment from NBA affiliate
- (TW) Two-way affiliate player
- Injured

Roster
Updated: March 4, 2026

=== Delaware Blue Coats ===
Delaware Blue Coats roster
Players

Pos.	No.	Player	Height	Weight	DOB	From
F	7	Marcus Bagley	6 ft 6 in (1.98 m)	217 lb (98 kg)	2001-10-23	Arizona State
F	–	Cris Carroll	6 ft 6 in (1.98 m)	230 lb (104 kg)		Youngstown State
G	–	T. J. Clark	6 ft 3 in (1.91 m)	188 lb (85 kg)	2003-11-24	Newton HS (GA)
C	99	Tacko Fall (TW)	7 ft 6 in (2.29 m)	311 lb (141 kg)	1995-12-10	Central Florida
G	–	Taye Fields	6 ft 4 in (1.93 m)	212 lb (96 kg)	2003-07-16	North Alabama
G	–	Caleb Love (TW)	6 ft 3 in (1.91 m)	212 lb (96 kg)	2001-09-27	Arizona
F	–	Dillon Jones	6 ft 5 in (1.96 m)	235 lb (107 kg)	2001-10-29	Weber State
G	31	Duke Miles	6 ft 2 in (1.88 m)	188 lb (85 kg)	2002-02-03	Vanderbilt
G	14	Jameer Nelson Jr.	6 ft 1 in (1.85 m)	190 lb (86 kg)	2001-08-07	TCU
C	34	Abou Ousmane	6 ft 9 in (2.06 m)	255 lb (116 kg)	2001-04-07	Oklahoma State
F	–	Guy Ragland Jr.	6 ft 8 in (2.03 m)	246 lb (112 kg)	2002-07-20	Cornell
G/F	–	Rayan Rupert (TW)	6 ft 7 in (2.01 m)	205 lb (93 kg)	2004-05-21	France
F	–	Patrick Suemnick	6 ft 8 in (2.03 m)	225 lb (102 kg)	2002-01-01	Seton Hall
F	–	Jason Thirdkill Jr.	6 ft 7 in (2.01 m)	220 lb (100 kg)	2004-01-01	Jacksonville
F	8	Saint Thomas	6 ft 7 in (2.01 m)	235 lb (107 kg)	2003-05-01	USC
G	–	Kellen Tynes	6 ft 3 in (1.91 m)	175 lb (79 kg)	2001-09-05	Maine
G	–	Jaeden Zackery	6 ft 2 in (1.88 m)	220 lb (100 kg)	2001-08-29	Clemson

Coaches
Head coach
- JP Clark
Assistant(s)
- Ryan Ayers

Legend
- (DP) Unsigned draft pick
- (FA) Free agent
- (S) Suspended
- (P) Prospects
- (NBA) On assignment from NBA affiliate
- (TW) Two-way affiliate player
- Injured

Roster
Updated: October 24, 2026

=== Grand Rapids Gold ===
Grand Rapids Gold roster
Players

Pos.	No.	Player	Height	Weight	DOB	From
G/F	7	Tony Carr	6 ft 5 in (1.96 m)	200 lb (91 kg)	1997-10-11	Penn State
F	15	Ben Coupet Jr.	6 ft 7 in (2.01 m)	185 lb (84 kg)	1998-01-28	Southern Illinois
F/C	21	Steven Crowl	7 ft 0 in (2.13 m)	247 lb (112 kg)	2001-07-01	Wisconsin
G	3	Rahsool Diggins	6 ft 2 in (1.88 m)	185 lb (84 kg)	1999-10-13	UMass
F	2	Terrence Hargrove	6 ft 4 in (1.93 m)	215 lb (98 kg)	2001-05-10	Saint Louis
G/F	22	P. J. Hayes	6 ft 6 in (1.98 m)	215 lb (98 kg)	2001-07-25	Rutgers
F	–	Bryce Hopkins (TW)	6 ft 7 in (2.01 m)	225 lb (102 kg)	2002-09-07	St John's
G	–	Ryan Nembhard (TW)	5 ft 11 in (1.80 m)	180 lb (82 kg)	2003-03-10	Gonzaga
F	–	Cam Whitmore (TW)	6 ft 7 in (2.01 m)	230 lb (104 kg)	2004-07-08	Villanova

Coaches
Head coach
- Ryan Bowen
Assistant(s)
- Daisuke Yoshimoto
- Logan Quinn
- Antonio Bostic

Legend
- (DP) Unsigned draft pick
- (FA) Free agent
- (S) Suspended
- (P) Prospects
- (NBA) On assignment from NBA affiliate
- (TW) Two-way affiliate player
- Injured

Roster
Updated: March 25, 2026

=== Greensboro Swarm ===
Greensboro Swarm roster
Players

Pos.	No.	Player	Height	Weight	DOB	From
C	5	PJ Hall (TW)	6 ft 9 in (2.06 m)	245 lb (111 kg)	2002-02-21	Clemson
G	10	DJ Rodman	6 ft 6 in (1.98 m)	215 lb (98 kg)	2001-04-25	USC
SG	13	Dereon Seabron	6 ft 5 in (1.96 m)	180 lb (82 kg)	2000-05-26	NC State
G	–	Michael Ajayi (TW)	6 ft 7 in (2.01 m)	245 lb (111 kg)	2003-05-23	Butler
G	–	Kylan Boswell (TW)	6 ft 1 in (1.85 m)	200 lb (91 kg)	2005-04-28	Illinois

Coaches
Head coach
- D.J. Bakker
Assistant(s)
- David Noel
- Nathan Peavy
- Alex Ruoff

Legend
- (DP) Unsigned draft pick
- (FA) Free agent
- (S) Suspended
- (P) Prospects
- (NBA) On assignment from NBA affiliate
- (TW) Two-way affiliate player
- Injured

Roster
Updated: March 4, 2026

=== Noblesville Boom ===
Noblesville Boom roster
Players

Pos.	No.	Player	Height	Weight	DOB	From
F	0	Keion Brooks Jr.	6 ft 7 in (2.01 m)	210 lb (95 kg)	2000-08-07	Washington
F	24	Kobe Brown (TW)	6 ft 7 in (2.01 m)	250 lb (113 kg)	2000-01-01	Missouri
F	33	Omar El-Sheikh	6 ft 8 in (2.03 m)	218 lb (99 kg)	1998-05-14	Arkansas State
F	12	MJ Iraldi	6 ft 6 in (1.98 m)	190 lb (86 kg)	2001-08-31	Nova Southeastern
C	35	Samson Johnson	6 ft 10 in (2.08 m)	224 lb (102 kg)	2002-07-28	Connecticut
F	1	Cody Martin	6 ft 6 in (1.98 m)	205 lb (93 kg)	1995-09-28	Nevada
F	–	Isaih Moore	6 ft 10 in (2.08 m)	197 lb (89 kg)	2000-08-30	Fresno State
F	18	Jalen Slawson (TW)	6 ft 7 in (2.01 m)	215 lb (98 kg)	1999-10-22	Furman
G	–	Braden Smith (TW)	5 ft 11 in (1.80 m)	170 lb (77 kg)	2003-07-25	Purdue
G	5	Au'Diese Toney	6 ft 6 in (1.98 m)	205 lb (93 kg)	1999-11-12	Arkansas

Coaches
Head coach
- Bryce Taylor
Assistant(s)
- Rob Dosier
- Justin Wetzel

Legend
- (DP) Unsigned draft pick
- (FA) Free agent
- (S) Suspended
- (P) Prospects
- (NBA) On assignment from NBA affiliate
- (TW) Two-way affiliate player
- Injured

Roster
Updated: March 5, 2026

=== Laketown Squadron ===
Laketown Squadron roster
Players

Pos.	No.	Player	Height	Weight	DOB	From
G	3	D. J. Carton	6 ft 3 in (1.91 m)	200 lb (91 kg)	2000-08-05	Marquette
F	–	Malik Dia (TW)	6 ft 9 in (2.06 m)	240 lb (109 kg)		Mississippi
G	21	Caleb Mills	6 ft 5 in (1.96 m)	185 lb (84 kg)	2000-07-24	Memphis
F	5	Jalon Moore	6 ft 6 in (1.98 m)	211 lb (96 kg)	2003-04-03	Oklahoma
G	–	Jaron Pierre Jr. (TW)	6 ft 5 in (1.96 m)	210 lb (95 kg)	2002-07-12	SMU
G/F	98	Jaykwon Walton	6 ft 7 in (2.01 m)	206 lb (93 kg)	2001-07-12	Memphis

Coaches
Head coach
- Joe Barrer
Assistant(s)
- Will Bynum
- AJ Carr
- Danté Milligan

Legend
- (DP) Unsigned draft pick
- (FA) Free agent
- (S) Suspended
- (P) Prospects
- (NBA) On assignment from NBA affiliate
- (TW) Two-way affiliate player
- Injured

Roster
Updated: March 14, 2026

=== Long Island Nets ===
Long Island Nets roster
Players

Pos.	No.	Player	Height	Weight	DOB	From
F/C	34	Tyler Bilodeau (TW)	6 ft 8 in (2.03 m)	230 lb (104 kg)	2004-04-17	UCLA
G	13	Dion Brown	6 ft 3 in (1.91 m)	180 lb (82 kg)	2003-05-26	Saint Louis
G	50	Joey Calcaterra	6 ft 3 in (1.91 m)	165 lb (75 kg)	1998-10-15	Connecticut
F	42	Dain Dainja	6 ft 9 in (2.06 m)	255 lb (116 kg)	2002-07-16	Memphis
G	22	Tidjiane Dioumassi	6 ft 4 in (1.93 m)	200 lb (91 kg)		Western Carolina Catamounts
F	12	Ben Humrichous	6 ft 9 in (2.06 m)	235 lb (107 kg)	2002-07-28	Illinois
F	31	Chaney Johnson (TW)	6 ft 7 in (2.01 m)	220 lb (100 kg)	2002-06-20	Auburn
G	24	Jamal Mashburn Jr.	6 ft 2 in (1.88 m)	195 lb (88 kg)	2001-09-29	Temple
G	0	Dwight Murray Jr.	6 ft 0 in (1.83 m)	180 lb (82 kg)	2000-01-31	Rider
F	16	Grant Nelson (TW)	6 ft 10 in (2.08 m)	240 lb (109 kg)	2002-03-18	Alabama
F	6	Jonathan Pierre	6 ft 9 in (2.06 m)	210 lb (95 kg)	2003-04-20	Belmont
G/F	5	Wooga Poplar	6 ft 5 in (1.96 m)	197 lb (89 kg)	2003-01-05	Villanova
F/C	23	Nick Pringle	6 ft 10 in (2.08 m)	230 lb (104 kg)	2001-09-16	Arkansas
G	10	DJ Rodman	6 ft 6 in (1.98 m)	215 lb (98 kg)	2001-04-25	USC
G	1	Aaron Scott	6 ft 7 in (2.01 m)	190 lb (86 kg)	2003-01-11	St. John's
G	2	Isaiah Wong	6 ft 3 in (1.91 m)	185 lb (84 kg)	2001-01-28	Miami (FL)

Coaches
Head coach
- Shawn Swords
Assistant(s)
- Jorge Gutiérrez
- Bryson Johnson
- Al Paul
- Khalif Wyatt
- Vladimir Lukomski

Legend
- (DP) Unsigned draft pick
- (FA) Free agent
- (S) Suspended
- (P) Prospects
- (NBA) On assignment from NBA affiliate
- (TW) Two-way affiliate player
- Injured

Roster
Updated: October 15, 2026

=== Maine Celtics ===
Maine Celtics roster
Players

Pos.	No.	Player	Height	Weight	DOB	From
G	–	Devin Carter (TW)	6 ft 2 in (1.88 m)	199 lb (90 kg)	2002-03-18	Providence
C	21	Ebenezer Dowuona	6 ft 11 in (2.11 m)	230 lb (104 kg)	2002-06-30	James Madison
F	–	Gabe McGlothan	6 ft 6 in (1.98 m)	235 lb (107 kg)	1999-03-03	Grand Canyon
F	–	Dillon Mitchell (TW)	6 ft 6 in (1.98 m)	200 lb (91 kg)	2003-10-03	St. John's
F	10	Kameron Warrens	6 ft 5 in (1.96 m)	205 lb (93 kg)	2000-02-22	Mary
F/C	77	Amari Williams (TW)	6 ft 11 in (2.11 m)	269 lb (122 kg)	2002-01-28	Kentucky

Coaches
Head coach
- Phil Pressey
Assistant(s)
- Brendan Baker
- Taaj Ridley
- Landon Tatum
- Steve Tchiengang (Associate HC)

Legend
- (DP) Unsigned draft pick
- (FA) Free agent
- (S) Suspended
- (P) Prospects
- (NBA) On assignment from NBA affiliate
- (TW) Two-way affiliate player
- Injured

Roster
Updated: July 1, 2026

=== Motor City Cruise ===
Motor City Cruise roster
Players

Pos.	No.	Player	Height	Weight	DOB	From
F	4	Dawson Garcia	6 ft 9 in (2.06 m)	235 lb (107 kg)	2001-09-20	Marquette
G	–	Elijah Harkless (TW)	6 ft 3 in (1.91 m)	195 lb (88 kg)	2000-02-03	UNLV
F	–	Isaac Jones (TW)	6 ft 8 in (2.03 m)	245 lb (111 kg)	2000-07-11	Washington State
C	–	Ugonna Onyenso (TW)	6 ft 11 in (2.11 m)	225 lb (102 kg)	2004-09-25	Nigeria
C	–	Vianney Salatchoum	6 ft 10 in (2.08 m)	215 lb (98 kg)	2002-02-07	TCU
C	7	O'Mar Stanley	6 ft 8 in (2.03 m)	240 lb (109 kg)	2001-10-02	Boise State
F	9	John Ukomadu	6 ft 7 in (2.01 m)	195 lb (88 kg)	2001-10-30	Eastern Kentucky
G/F	3	Brice Williams	6 ft 5 in (1.96 m)	214 lb (97 kg)	2001-07-05	Nebraska

Coaches
Head coach
- Jamelle McMillan
Assistant(s)
- Marcus Stout (Associate HC)

Legend
- (DP) Unsigned draft pick
- (FA) Free agent
- (S) Suspended
- (P) Prospects
- (NBA) On assignment from NBA affiliate
- (TW) Two-way affiliate player
- Injured

Roster
Updated: July 2, 2026

=== Osceola Magic ===
Osceola Magic roster
Players

Pos.	No.	Player	Height	Weight	DOB	From
C	14	Colin Castleton (TW)	6 ft 10 in (2.08 m)	250 lb (113 kg)	2000-05-25	Florida
F	24	Kevin Knox II	6 ft 7 in (2.01 m)	215 lb (98 kg)	1999-08-11	Kentucky
G	30	Alex Morales (TW)	6 ft 6 in (1.98 m)	195 lb (88 kg)	1997-11-21	Wagner
F	25	Izaiyah Nelson (TW)	6 ft 10 in (2.08 m)	218 lb (99 kg)	2003-10-01	South Florida

Coaches
Head coach
- Ronnie Burrell
Assistant(s)
- Thomas Bridges
- Corey Hawkins
- Johnny Taylor

Legend
- (DP) Unsigned draft pick
- (FA) Free agent
- (S) Suspended
- (P) Prospects
- (NBA) On assignment from NBA affiliate
- (TW) Two-way affiliate player
- Injured

Roster
Updated: September 1, 2026

=== Raptors 905 ===
Raptors 905 roster
Players

Pos.	No.	Player	Height	Weight	DOB	From
F/C	–	Aziz Bandaogo	7 ft 0 in (2.13 m)	235 lb (107 kg)	2001-01-18	Cincinnati
C	—	Nate Bittle (TW)	7 ft 0 in (2.13 m)	215 lb (98 kg)	2003-06-03	Oregon
F	20	Tyson Degenhart	6 ft 8 in (2.03 m)	235 lb (107 kg)	2002-10-13	Boise State
F	13	Quincy Guerrier	6 ft 7 in (2.01 m)	220 lb (100 kg)	1999-05-13	Illinois
G	25	A. J. Hoggard	6 ft 3 in (1.91 m)	220 lb (100 kg)	2000-09-25	Vanderbilt
G	3	Patrick McCaw	6 ft 7 in (2.01 m)	181 lb (82 kg)	1995-10-25	UNLV
G	9	Tylor Perry	5 ft 11 in (1.80 m)	180 lb (82 kg)	2001-01-17	Kansas State
F	35	Caleb Stone-Carrawell	6 ft 7 in (2.01 m)	220 lb (100 kg)	2000-11-25	Loyola Marymount
G	–	Malachi Smith (TW)	6 ft 4 in (1.93 m)	205 lb (93 kg)	1999-12-06	Gonzaga
C	33	Jamarion Sharp	7 ft 5 in (2.26 m)	235 lb (107 kg)	2001-08-26	Mississippi
G	17	Jalen Williams	6 ft 5 in (1.96 m)	200 lb (91 kg)	2002-08-12	Clark Atlanta

Coaches
Head coach
- Drew Jones
Assistant(s)
- Matt Gray
- Joshua Henderson
- Arsalan Jamil
- Brandon Leftwich
- Justin Serresse

Legend
- (DP) Unsigned draft pick
- (FA) Free agent
- (S) Suspended
- (P) Prospects
- (NBA) On assignment from NBA affiliate
- (TW) Two-way affiliate player
- Injured

Roster
Updated: April 5, 2026

=== Westchester Knicks ===
Westchester Knicks roster
Players

Pos.	No.	Player	Height	Weight	DOB	From
G	—	Jaden Akins (TW)	6 ft 2 in (1.88 m)	195 lb (88 kg)	2003-02-25	Michigan State
F	91	Nick Jourdain	6 ft 9 in (2.06 m)	220 lb (100 kg)	2001-06-29	Memphis
F	—	Dalton Knecht (TW)	6 ft 6 in (1.98 m)	215 lb (98 kg)	2001-04-19	Tennessee
F	44	Igor Miličić Jr.	6 ft 10 in (2.08 m)	225 lb (102 kg)	2002-08-27	Tennessee
F	–	Tyler Nickel (TW)	6 ft 7 in (2.01 m)	220 lb (100 kg)	2003-09-05	Vanderbilt
G	0	Paul Zilinskas	6 ft 5 in (1.96 m)	205 lb (93 kg)	2001-08-15	IUPUI

Coaches
Head coach
- DeSagana Diop
Assistant(s)
- Allen Deep
- Lisa Willis

Legend
- (DP) Unsigned draft pick
- (FA) Free agent
- (S) Suspended
- (P) Prospects
- (NBA) On assignment from NBA affiliate
- (TW) Two-way affiliate player
- Injured

Roster
Updated: October 23, 2026

=== Windy City Bulls ===
Windy City Bulls roster
Players

Pos.	No.	Player	Height	Weight	DOB	From
F	19	Tobe Awaka (TW)	6 ft 8 in (2.03 m)	250 lb (113 kg)	2004-01-30	Arizona
F	11	Jalen Bridges	6 ft 7 in (2.01 m)	221 lb (100 kg)	2001-05-14	Baylor
G	15	Jordan Hawkins (TW)	6 ft 4 in (1.93 m)	190 lb (86 kg)	2002-04-29	Connecticut
G	95	Houston Mallette	6 ft 5 in (1.96 m)	202 lb (92 kg)	2003-04-09	Alabama
G	9	Remy Martin	6 ft 0 in (1.83 m)	175 lb (79 kg)	1998-06-16	Kansas
F	88	Grant Newell	6 ft 9 in (2.06 m)	220 lb (100 kg)	2002-12-13	Western Kentucky
F	7	D.J. Patrick	6 ft 6 in (1.98 m)	205 lb (93 kg)	2001-01-01	UNC Asheville
F	13	Drew Peterson	6 ft 8 in (2.03 m)	200 lb (91 kg)	1999-11-09	USC
C	00	Orlando Robinson	6 ft 10 in (2.08 m)	235 lb (107 kg)	2000-07-10	Fresno State
C	25	Jasman Sangha	6 ft 8 in (2.03 m)	230 lb (104 kg)	1999-04-18	Canisius
G	22	Jaylin Sellers (TW)	6 ft 4 in (1.93 m)	205 lb (93 kg)	2003-06-03	Providence
G	24	Isaiah Stevens	5 ft 11 in (1.80 m)	185 lb (84 kg)	2000-11-01	Colorado State
G	3	Peter Suder	6 ft 5 in (1.96 m)	215 lb (98 kg)	2003-07-29	Miami (OH)
F	0	Marquel Sutton	6 ft 9 in (2.06 m)	205 lb (93 kg)	2003-01-11	LSU
C	54	Russel Tchewa	7 ft 0 in (2.13 m)	275 lb (125 kg)	2000-03-07	Georgia

Coaches
Head coach
- Quincy Pondexter
Assistant(s)
- Dru Anthrop
- Marlon Garnett
- Lazeric Jones
- Jake McGee

Legend
- (DP) Unsigned draft pick
- (FA) Free agent
- (S) Suspended
- (P) Prospects
- (NBA) On assignment from NBA affiliate
- (TW) Two-way affiliate player
- Injured

Roster
Updated: October 26, 2026

=== Wisconsin Herd ===
Wisconsin Herd roster
Players

Pos.	No.	Player	Height	Weight	DOB	From
G	–	Ty Berry	6 ft 3 in (1.91 m)	185 lb (84 kg)	2001-10-12	Northwestern
F	22	Johni Broome	6 ft 10 in (2.08 m)	244 lb (111 kg)	2002-07-19	Auburn
F	–	Jermiah Burke	6 ft 7 in (2.01 m)	215 lb (98 kg)	2003-08-04	Denver
F	13	John Butler Jr.	7 ft 0 in (2.13 m)	220 lb (100 kg)	2002-12-04	Florida State
F	–	Jack Doumbia Jr.	6 ft 4 in (1.93 m)	205 lb (93 kg)	2002-01-01	Towson
G	–	Brody Fox	6 ft 6 in (1.98 m)	200 lb (91 kg)	2002-04-01	The Citadel
G	13	Marcus Garrett	6 ft 5 in (1.96 m)	205 lb (93 kg)	1998-11-09	Kansas
F	2	Terrence Hargrove Jr.	6 ft 4 in (1.93 m)	215 lb (98 kg)	2001-05-10	Saint Louis
G	7	Kam Jones (TW)	6 ft 4 in (1.93 m)	200 lb (91 kg)	2002-02-25	Marquette
F	35	Pete Nance (TW)	6 ft 9 in (2.06 m)	225 lb (102 kg)	2000-02-19	North Carolina
G	35	Manny Obaseki	6 ft 4 in (1.93 m)	200 lb (91 kg)	2002-09-05	Texas A&M
G	99	Cameron Parker	6 ft 2 in (1.88 m)	170 lb (77 kg)	1998-12-16	Portland State
G	30	Cormac Ryan (TW)	6 ft 5 in (1.96 m)	205 lb (93 kg)	1998-10-26	North Carolina
C	33	Jake Stephens	6 ft 11 in (2.11 m)	270 lb (122 kg)	1999-11-05	Chattanooga

Coaches
Head coach
- Schuyler Rimmer
Assistant(s)
- Jordan Ash
- Montay Brandon
- JD DuBois

Legend
- (DP) Unsigned draft pick
- (FA) Free agent
- (S) Suspended
- (P) Prospects
- (NBA) On assignment from NBA affiliate
- (TW) Two-way affiliate player
- Injured

Roster
Updated: October 28, 2026

== Western Conference ==
There are a total of 15 teams in the Western Conference.

=== Austin Spurs ===
Austin Spurs roster
Players

Pos.	No.	Player	Height	Weight	DOB	From
F	–	Maliq Brown (TW)	6 ft 9 in (2.06 m)	225 lb (102 kg)	2003-11-16	Duke
G	–	Ja'Kobi Gillespie (TW)	6 ft 1 in (1.85 m)	186 lb (84 kg)	2004-03-10	Tennessee
G	25	David Jones García (TW)	6 ft 4 in (1.93 m)	210 lb (95 kg)	2001-11-24	Memphis
G	7	Isaiah Miller	6 ft 0 in (1.83 m)	180 lb (82 kg)	1997-11-09	UNC Greensboro
F	–	Terry Taylor	6 ft 4 in (1.93 m)	230 lb (104 kg)	1999-09-23	Austin Peay

Coaches
Head coach
- Vacant
Assistant(s)
- Jesse Childs
- K.J. Conklin
- Willis Hall
- Pierre Parker

Legend
- (DP) Unsigned draft pick
- (FA) Free agent
- (S) Suspended
- (P) Prospects
- (NBA) On assignment from NBA affiliate
- (TW) Two-way affiliate player
- Injured

Roster
Updated: March 1, 2026

=== Capitanes de la Ciudad de México ===
Mexico City Capitanes roster
Players

Pos.	No.	Player	Height	Weight	DOB	From
G/F	4	Chad Baker-Mazara	6 ft 7 in (2.01 m)	172 lb (78 kg)	1995-09-28	USC
C	11	Tomás Chapero	6 ft 10 in (2.08 m)	192 lb (87 kg)	2001-06-10	Argentina
SG	25	Luke Martinez	6 ft 4 in (1.93 m)	194 lb (88 kg)	1990-08-24	Wyoming
G	–	Zeke Mayo	6 ft 4 in (1.93 m)	185 lb (84 kg)	2002-18-12	Kansas
SF	–	Cody Martin	6 ft 6 in (1.98 m)	205 lb (93 kg)	1995-09-28	Nevada

Coaches
Head coach
- (Brazil) Vitor Galvani
Assistant(s)
- (Venezuela) Danny Soto
- (Argentina) Tomás Lamas
- (Mexico) Joaquín Villanueva

Legend
- (DP) Unsigned draft pick
- (FA) Free agent
- (S) Suspended
- (P) Prospects
- (NBA) On assignment from NBA affiliate
- (TW) Two-way affiliate player
- Injured

Roster
Updated: October 16, 2026

=== Coachella Valley Lakers ===
Coachella Valley Lakers roster
Players

Pos.	No.	Player	Height	Weight	DOB	From
F	21	Luke Goode	6 ft 7 in (2.01 m)	210 lb (95 kg)	2002-08-24	Indiana
F	47	Arthur Kaluma (TW)	6 ft 7 in (2.01 m)	225 lb (102 kg)	2002-03-01	Texas
G	30	Chris Mañon (TW)	6 ft 4 in (1.93 m)	209 lb (95 kg)	2001-12-09	Vanderbilt
F	31	AK Okereke (TW)	6 ft 7 in (2.01 m)	244 lb (111 kg)	2003-07-02	Vanderbilt
G	55	Ethan Taylor	6 ft 5 in (1.96 m)	205 lb (93 kg)	2002-02-06	Air Force

Coaches
Head coach
- Zach Guthrie
Assistant(s)
- Alex Cerda
- Mo Charlo
- Liam Flynn
- Perry Huang

Legend
- (DP) Unsigned draft pick
- (FA) Free agent
- (S) Suspended
- (P) Prospects
- (NBA) On assignment from NBA affiliate
- (TW) Two-way affiliate player
- Injured

Roster
Updated: July 3, 2026

=== Iowa Wolves ===
Iowa Wolves roster
Players

Pos.	No.	Player	Height	Weight	DOB	From
F	25	Enrique Freeman (TW)	6 ft 8 in (2.03 m)	220 lb (100 kg)	2000-07-29	Akron
G	13	Dajuan Harris Jr.	6 ft 2 in (1.88 m)	175 lb (79 kg)	2000-12-11	Kansas
G	15	Zyon Pullin (TW)	6 ft 4 in (1.93 m)	206 lb (93 kg)	2001-03-03	Florida
G	11	Eli Pemberton	6 ft 5 in (1.96 m)	195 lb (88 kg)	1997-05-31	Hofstra
F	1	Nate Santos	6 ft 7 in (2.01 m)	215 lb (98 kg)	2001-11-09	Dayton
SG	—	Stevie Thompson	6 ft 5 in (1.96 m)	190 lb (86 kg)	2026-03-23	Oregon
C	44	Rocco Zikarsky (TW)	7 ft 3 in (2.21 m)	227 lb (103 kg)	2006-07-11	Brisbane

Coaches
Head coach
- Ernest Scott
Assistant(s)
- Nate Bubes
- Michael DiBenedetto
- Kelly McCarty

Legend
- (DP) Unsigned draft pick
- (FA) Free agent
- (S) Suspended
- (P) Prospects
- (NBA) On assignment from NBA affiliate
- (TW) Two-way affiliate player
- Injured

Roster
Updated: March 7, 2026

=== Memphis Hustle ===
Memphis Hustle roster
Players

Pos.	No.	Player	Height	Weight	DOB	From
G	23	Tommy Bruner	6 ft 1 in (1.85 m)	180 lb (82 kg)	2001-04-21	Denver
G	99	Yuri Collins	6 ft 0 in (1.83 m)	190 lb (86 kg)	2001-03-07	Saint Louis
C	–	Carson Cooper (TW)	6 ft 11 in (2.11 m)	245 lb (111 kg)	2004-04-09	Michigan State
G	–	Kira Lewis Jr.	6 ft 1 in (1.85 m)	170 lb (77 kg)	2001-04-06	Alabama
G	21	Jahmai Mashack (TW)	6 ft 4 in (1.93 m)	203 lb (92 kg)	2002-11-10	Tennessee
G	10	Javon Small (TW)	6 ft 3 in (1.91 m)	190 lb (86 kg)	2002-12-19	West Virginia
F	1	Lahat Thioune	6 ft 10 in (2.08 m)	224 lb (102 kg)	1999-11-02	South Dakota

Coaches
Head coach
- T. C. Swirsky
Assistant(s)
- Danielle Boiago
- Nick Covington
- Jack Hostetler
- Rob Sanicola

Legend
- (DP) Unsigned draft pick
- (FA) Free agent
- (S) Suspended
- (P) Prospects
- (NBA) On assignment from NBA affiliate
- (TW) Two-way affiliate player
- Injured

Roster
Updated: July 1, 2026

=== Oklahoma City Blue ===
Oklahoma City Blue roster
Players

Pos.	No.	Player	Height	Weight	DOB	From
F	12	Jabri Abdur-Rahim	6 ft 8 in (2.03 m)	220 lb (100 kg)	2002–03–22	Providence
G	―	Jailen Bedford	6 ft 4 in (1.93 m)	189 lb (86 kg)		Virginia Tech
G	23	Brooks Barnhizer (TW)	6 ft 6 in (1.98 m)	227 lb (103 kg)	2002-03-02	Northwestern
G	35	Buddy Boeheim	6 ft 5 in (1.96 m)	205 lb (93 kg)	1999-11-11	Syracuse
G	–	Josh Dix (TW)	6 ft 5 in (1.96 m)	210 lb (95 kg)	2004-06-29	Creighton
G	25	Trey Galloway	6 ft 5 in (1.96 m)	205 lb (93 kg)	2001–11–28	Indiana
F	–	Andrew Holifield	6 ft 10 in (2.08 m)	185 lb (84 kg)	2002-02-02	Lamar
G	–	Nate Johnson	6 ft 3 in (1.91 m)	215 lb (98 kg)	2003-06-16	Kansas State
G/F	–	Micah Peavy (TW)	6 ft 6 in (1.98 m)	215 lb (98 kg)	2001-07-16	Georgetown
C	98	Seth Maxwell	7 ft 0 in (2.13 m)	235 lb (107 kg)	1998-11-21	Indiana Wesleyan
G	5	Anthony Pritchard	6 ft 2 in (1.88 m)	185 lb (84 kg)	2003–05–06	Central Michigan
SG	40	Zhaire Smith	6 ft 4 in (1.93 m)	205 lb (93 kg)	1999-06-04	Texas Tech
G	11	Bryce Thompson	6 ft 5 in (1.96 m)	200 lb (91 kg)	2002–02–26	Oklahoma State

Coaches
Head coach
- Daniel Dixon
Assistant(s)
- Ryan Greer
- Ellie Mack

Legend
- (DP) Unsigned draft pick
- (FA) Free agent
- (S) Suspended
- (P) Prospects
- (NBA) On assignment from NBA affiliate
- (TW) Two-way affiliate player
- Injured

Roster
Updated: April 12, 2026

=== Rio Grande Valley Vipers ===
Rio Grande Valley Vipers roster
Players

Pos.	No.	Player	Height	Weight	DOB	From
G	–	Quadir Copeland (TW)	6 ft 6 in (1.98 m)	214 lb (97 kg)	2003-09-04	NC State
F	9	Cameron Matthews	6 ft 7 in (2.01 m)	220 lb (100 kg)	2001-12-23	Mississippi State
G	22	Caleb McConnell	6 ft 7 in (2.01 m)	195 lb (88 kg)	1999-06-08	Rutgers
G	7	Stevie Mitchell	6 ft 3 in (1.91 m)	200 lb (91 kg)	2003-01-29	Marquette
F	–	Julian Phillips (TW)	6 ft 7 in (2.01 m)	205 lb (93 kg)	2003-11-05	Tennessee
F	6	Jonathan Pierre	6 ft 9 in (2.06 m)	210 lb (95 kg)	2003-04-20	Belmont
F/C	–	Oscar Tshiebwe (TW)	6 ft 8 in (2.03 m)	270 lb (122 kg)	1999-11-27	Kentucky

Coaches
Head coach
- Joseph Blair
Assistant(s)
- Daniel Brady
- Robbie Keck
- Kimberly McCartney
- Craig Skinner
- Isaiah Torres
- Jimmy Vidas

Legend
- (DP) Unsigned draft pick
- (FA) Free agent
- (S) Suspended
- (P) Prospects
- (NBA) On assignment from NBA affiliate
- (TW) Two-way affiliate player
- Injured

Roster
Updated: March 15, 2026

=== Rip City Remix ===
Rip City Remix roster
Players

Pos.	No.	Player	Height	Weight	DOB	From
F	29	Jayson Kent (TW)	6 ft 8 in (2.03 m)	215 lb (98 kg)	2002-02-03	Texas
F	55	Jaylen Martin	6 ft 6 in (1.98 m)	216 lb (98 kg)	2004-01-28	Overtime Elite
G	19	Jamiya Neal	6 ft 5 in (1.96 m)	195 lb (88 kg)	2003-04-04	Creighton
G	–	John Tonje (TW)	6 ft 4 in (1.93 m)	218 lb (99 kg)	2001-04-23	Wisconsin
G	3	Chris Youngblood (TW)	6 ft 4 in (1.93 m)	200 lb (91 kg)	2002-02-09	Alabama

Coaches
Head coach
- Jonah Herscu
Assistant(s)
- Charles Klask
- Nshan Kenjoian

Legend
- (DP) Unsigned draft pick
- (FA) Free agent
- (S) Suspended
- (P) Prospects
- (NBA) On assignment from NBA affiliate
- (TW) Two-way affiliate player
- Injured

Roster
Updated: July 2, 2026

=== Salt Lake City Stars ===
Salt Lake City Stars roster
Players

Pos.	No.	Player	Height	Weight	DOB	From
G	–	Trey Alexander (TW)	6 ft 5 in (1.96 m)	185 lb (84 kg)	2003-05-02	Creighton
G	–	Kobe Bufkin (TW)	6 ft 4 in (1.93 m)	195 lb (88 kg)	2003-09-21	Michigan
G	4	Justin Harmon	6 ft 4 in (1.93 m)	180 lb (82 kg)	2001-08-30	Illinois
F	–	Harrison Ingram (TW)	6 ft 5 in (1.96 m)	230 lb (104 kg)	2002-11-27	North Carolina

Coaches
Head coach
- Rick Higgins
Assistant(s)
- Isaiah Fox
- James Mays
- Brenden Morris
- Jia Perkins
- Brandon Robinson
- Ryan Toolson

Legend
- (DP) Unsigned draft pick
- (FA) Free agent
- (S) Suspended
- (P) Prospects
- (NBA) On assignment from NBA affiliate
- (TW) Two-way affiliate player
- Injured

Roster
Updated: March 6, 2026

=== San Diego Clippers (NBA G League) ===
San Diego Clippers roster
Players

Pos.	No.	Player	Height	Weight	DOB	From
G	27	Matt Allocco	6 ft 4 in (1.93 m)	197 lb (89 kg)	2001-01-08	Notre Dame
F/C	–	Daniel Batcho	6 ft 11 in (2.11 m)	235 lb (107 kg)	2002-01-10	Louisiana Tech
G	21	Desmond Cambridge Jr.	6 ft 4 in (1.93 m)	180 lb (82 kg)	1998-12-30	Arizona State
G	–	Cam Christie (TW)	6 ft 5 in (1.96 m)	190 lb (86 kg)	2005-07-24	Minnesota
F	–	Zee Hamoda	6 ft 7 in (2.01 m)	170 lb (77 kg)	2002-01-20	Nicholls State
F	–	Nick Martinelli (TW)	6 ft 7 in (2.01 m)	220 lb (100 kg)	2004-04-20	Northwestern
G	–	Jalen Pickett (TW)	6 ft 2 in (1.88 m)	202 lb (92 kg)	1999-10-22	Penn State

Coaches
Head coach
- Paul Hewitt
Assistant(s)
- Tim Dather
- Taylor Hollowell
- Darnell Jackson

Legend
- (DP) Unsigned draft pick
- (FA) Free agent
- (S) Suspended
- (P) Prospects
- (NBA) On assignment from NBA affiliate
- (TW) Two-way affiliate player
- Injured

Roster
Updated: March 5, 2026

=== Santa Cruz Warriors ===
Santa Cruz Warriors roster
Players

Pos.	No.	Player	Height	Weight	DOB	From
F	00	Jack Clark	6 ft 10 in (2.08 m)	215 lb (98 kg)	2000-02-14	VCU
G	18	LJ Cryer (TW)	6 ft 0 in (1.83 m)	197 lb (89 kg)	2001-10-09	Houston
G	25	Trey Galloway	6 ft 5 in (1.96 m)	205 lb (93 kg)	2001-11-28	Indiana
F	33	Malevy Leons (TW)	6 ft 9 in (2.06 m)	206 lb (93 kg)	1999-09-23	Bradley
G	55	Chance McMillian	6 ft 3 in (1.91 m)	195 lb (88 kg)	2001-02-06	Texas Tech
G	27	Franco Miller Jr.	6 ft 3 in (1.91 m)	200 lb (91 kg)	1999-02-09	Florida Gulf Coast
G	43	Deivon Smith	6 ft 0 in (1.83 m)	175 lb (79 kg)	2002-03-08	St. John's

Coaches
Head coach
- Lainn Wilson
Assistant(s)
- Hilton Armstrong
- Nick Kerr
- Ben Stelzer

Legend
- (DP) Unsigned draft pick
- (FA) Free agent
- (S) Suspended
- (P) Prospects
- (NBA) On assignment from NBA affiliate
- (TW) Two-way affiliate player
- Injured

Roster
Updated: March 3, 2026

=== Sioux Falls Skyforce ===
Sioux Falls Skyforce roster
Players

Pos.	No.	Player	Height	Weight	DOB	From
G	4	Cam Carter	6 ft 3 in (1.91 m)	190 lb (86 kg)	2003-03-17	LSU
G	–	Tre Donaldson (TW)	6 ft 2 in (1.88 m)	210 lb (95 kg)	2003-12-11	Miami (FL)
C	50	Vladislav Goldin (TW)	7 ft 0 in (2.13 m)	250 lb (113 kg)	2001-05-12	Michigan
F	–	Keshad Johnson (TW)	6 ft 7 in (2.01 m)	225 lb (102 kg)	2001-06-23	Arizona
F/C	20	Nathan Missia-Dio	6 ft 10 in (2.08 m)	223 lb (101 kg)	2004-11-17	Belgium
G	26	Dennis Smith Jr.	6 ft 2 in (1.88 m)	205 lb (93 kg)	1997-11-25	NC State
G	0	Blaise Threatt	6 ft 3 in (1.91 m)	210 lb (95 kg)	2000-09-08	Weber State

Coaches
Head coach
- Mario Casamajor
Assistant(s)
- Keita Bates-Diop
- Herman Mandole
- Ryan McAdoo
- Therian Williams
- Nate Wilson

Legend
- (DP) Unsigned draft pick
- (FA) Free agent
- (S) Suspended
- (P) Prospects
- (NBA) On assignment from NBA affiliate
- (TW) Two-way affiliate player
- Injured

Roster
Updated: March 10, 2026

=== Stockton Kings ===
Stockton Kings roster
Players

Pos.	No.	Player	Height	Weight	DOB	From
F	–	Leaky Black (TW)	6 ft 7 in (2.01 m)	209 lb (95 kg)	1999-06-14	North Carolina
G	0	Antoine Davis	6 ft 1 in (1.85 m)	165 lb (75 kg)	1998-10-03	Detroit Mercy
G	40	Sean East II	6 ft 3 in (1.91 m)	180 lb (82 kg)	1999-11-17	Missouri
G/F	1	KJ Jones II	6 ft 6 in (1.98 m)	190 lb (86 kg)	2001-03-31	Emmanuel University
G	22	Mitchell Mascari	6 ft 5 in (1.96 m)	200 lb (91 kg)	2000-08-21	Drake
F	–	Jonathan Mogbo (TW)	6 ft 7 in (2.01 m)	225 lb (102 kg)	2001-10-29	San Francisco
C	–	David Muoka	6 ft 10 in (2.08 m)	235 lb (107 kg)	2000-12-14	UNLV

Coaches
Head coach
- Will Scott
Assistant(s)
- Dru Anthrop
- Sidney Dobner
- Dane Johnson

Legend
- (DP) Unsigned draft pick
- (FA) Free agent
- (S) Suspended
- (P) Prospects
- (NBA) On assignment from NBA affiliate
- (TW) Two-way affiliate player
- Injured

Roster
Updated: March 3, 2026

=== Texas Legends ===
Texas Legends roster
Players

Pos.	No.	Player	Height	Weight	DOB	From
G	2	Mark Armstrong	6 ft 2 in (1.88 m)	180 lb (82 kg)	2004-02-21	Villanova
G	–	Walter Clayton Jr. (TW)	6 ft 3 in (1.91 m)	195 lb (88 kg)	2003-03-06	Florida
G	13	Sheldon Edwards	6 ft 4 in (1.93 m)	190 lb (86 kg)	2000-08-13	Loyola Chicago
G	10	Jack Gohlke	6 ft 3 in (1.91 m)	215 lb (98 kg)	1999-12-03	Oakland
G	–	Jett Howard (TW)	6 ft 8 in (2.03 m)	215 lb (98 kg)	2003-09-14	Michigan
F	–	Tobi Lawal (TW)	6 ft 8 in (2.03 m)	215 lb (98 kg)	2003-05-01	Virginia Tech

Coaches
Head coach
- Jordan Sears
Assistant(s)
- Cam Black
- Tevin Brown
- Kaleb Canales (associate HC)
- Parker Hines

Legend
- (DP) Unsigned draft pick
- (FA) Free agent
- (S) Suspended
- (P) Prospects
- (NBA) On assignment from NBA affiliate
- (TW) Two-way affiliate player
- Injured

Roster
Updated: March 4, 2026

=== Valley Suns ===
Valley Suns roster
Players

Pos.	No.	Player	Height	Weight	DOB	From
F	8	Kalib Boone	6 ft 9 in (2.06 m)	215 lb (98 kg)	2000-11-30	UNLV
G	19	Marcus Burk	6 ft 3 in (1.91 m)	205 lb (93 kg)	1997-09-27	IUPUI
G	–	Kennedy Chandler	6 ft 0 in (1.83 m)	170 lb (77 kg)	2002-09-16	Tennessee
G	4	Kaleb Johnson	6 ft 6 in (1.98 m)	205 lb (93 kg)	1996-11-21	Georgetown
G	11	JaQuori McLaughlin	6 ft 4 in (1.93 m)	190 lb (86 kg)	1998-01-29	UC Santa Barbara
C	–	Duop Reath (TW)	6 ft 10 in (2.08 m)	245 lb (111 kg)	1996-06-26	LSU
G	–	Pat Spencer (TW)	6 ft 2 in (1.88 m)	205 lb (93 kg)	1996-07-04	Northwestern
F	–	Drew Timme (TW)	6 ft 9 in (2.06 m)	235 lb (107 kg)	2000-09-09	Gonzaga

Coaches
Head coach
- Paul Jesperson
Assistant(s)
- Gerard Martin
- Jimmy King
- Ralik Wise
- Cedric Blossom (player development)
- Rick Carter (player development)
- Coleman Sparling (player development)

Legend
- (DP) Unsigned draft pick
- (FA) Free agent
- (S) Suspended
- (P) Prospects
- (NBA) On assignment from NBA affiliate
- (TW) Two-way affiliate player
- Injured

Roster
Updated: July 1, 2026
