= Joaquín Villanueva =

Joaquín Villanueva may refer to:

- Joaquín Lorenzo Villanueva, Spanish priest, historian and writer
- Joaquín Villanueva (basketball), Mexican basketball player and coach
- Joaquín Villanueva (governor)
