= Mittmann =

Mittmann is a surname. Notable people with the surname include:

- Nils Mittmann (born 1979), German basketball player
- Otfrid Mittmann (1908–1998), German mathematician
