= Esteban Roacho =

Mexican basketball player (born 2002)

No. 10 – Mexico City Capitanes
- Position: Point guard
- League: NBA G League

Personal information
- Born: 28 January 2002 (age 24) Ciudad Cuauhtémoc, Chihuahua, Mexico
- Listed height: 6 ft 5 in (1.96 m)
- Listed weight: 193 lb (88 kg)

Career information
- College: Texas A&M International (2023–2025)
- NBA draft: 2025: undrafted
- Playing career: 2025–present

Career history
- 2025–present: Mexico City Capitanes

Esteban Ezekiel Roacho Amador (born 28 January 2002) is a Mexican professional basketball player for the Mexico City Capitanes of the NBA G League.

== Career ==
Roacho made his debut in the 2025–2026 season with the Mexico City Capitanes to play in the NBA G League.
