= Ramón Díaz Sánchez =

Spanish basketball coach

Löwen Braunschweig
- Position: Head coach
- League: Basketball Bundesliga

Personal information
- Born: 10 December 1982 (age 43) Granada, Spain
- Coaching career: 2010–present

Career history

Coaching
- 2010–2011: Ciudad de Guadix
- 2013–2014: Halcones de Xalapa (assistant)
- 2013–2018: Mexico (assistant)
- 2017–2025: Mexico City Capitanes
- 2025–2026: Covirán Granada
- 2026–present: Löwen Braunschweig

Ramón Díaz Sánchez (born 10 December 1982) is a Spanish basketball coach. He is the current head coach of Löwen Braunschweig of the Basketball Bundesliga (BBL).

== Coaching career ==
Díaz Sánchez started his coaching career in Spain with CB Ciudad de Guadix in the Liga EBA, the national fourth tier.

In the 2013–14 season, he was the assistant coach for Halcones de Xalapa in Mexico.

On 8 October 2017, Díaz Sánchez signed with the Mexico City Capitanes, a newly established team in Mexico City. In his first two seasons, he reached the LNBP finals with Capitanes, losing both.

He was the head coach of Covirán Granada of the Liga ACB from July 2025 until his resignation in January 2026.

On February 13, 2026, he signed with Löwen Braunschweig of the Basketball Bundesliga (BBL).
