= Richard Melzer =

American basketball player (born 1979)

Personal information
- Born: December 8, 1979 (age 46) Minneapolis, Minnesota, U.S.
- Listed height: 6 ft 8 in (2.03 m)
- Listed weight: 224.4 lb (102 kg)

Career information
- High school: River Falls (River Falls, Wisconsin)
- College: Wisconsin–River Falls (2000–2004)
- NBA draft: 2004: undrafted
- Playing career: 2004–2012
- Position: Power forward / center

Career history
- 2004–2005: Sioux Falls Skyforce
- 2005: Club San Carlos
- 2005–2006: New Zealand Breakers
- 2006: Albuquerque Thunderbirds
- 2006: ASVEL Basket
- 2006: JL Bourg-en-Bresse
- 2007: Hapoel Gilboa/Afula
- 2007: Artland Dragons
- 2009–2010: Cairns Taipans
- 2010: Rio Grande Valley Vipers
- 2010–2011: Hapoel Holon
- 2011–2012: New Yorker Phantoms Braunschweig
- 2012: Le Portel

Career highlights
- CBA champion (2005); NBA D-League champion (2010); NABC Division III Player of the Year (2004)

Richard Melzer (born December 8, 1979) is an American former professional basketball player who has played in the Australian National Basketball League, the German Bundesliga, NBA D-League, Continental Basketball Association, as well as stints in France and Israel. He primarily played power forward.

Melzer is a 1999 graduate of River Falls High School in Wisconsin. His brother Michael Grinnell was also a basketball prospect. Grinnell played for Carleton College in Minnesota since the Fall of 2008.

Melzer was named NCAA Division III Player of the Year by the National Association of Basketball Coaches (NABC) and the D-III News as a senior at Wisconsin–River Falls. He earned First Team All-America honours from the NABC his junior and senior seasons. He was named All-WIAC his last three seasons and was named league MVP his final two years and finished his career as the school's second all-time leading scorer with 2, 363 points, the third all-time leading rebounder with 821 boards, and the all-time leading shot-blocker with 186 rejections.

Melzer spent time trying out with the NBA's Washington Wizards, Chicago Bulls and the Orlando Magic. He also earned a spot on the San Antonio Spurs but was not named to the team's final roster. He led the Sioux Falls Skyforce to the Continental Basketball Association Championship in 2005. He also won a title with San Carlos in the Dominican Republic League and was voted MVP of the National Finals.

Melzer spent the 2005–06 season with the New Zealand Breakers of the NBL, earning NBL Player of the Week in Week 20.

On July 14, 2006, Melzler signed a two-year contract with the San Antonio Spurs. He appeared in four preseason games, averaging 2.8 points in 7.8 minutes. He was released by the Spurs on October 20, 2006.

Melzer signed a 3-month contract with ASVEL Villeurbanne of France while still under contract with San Antonio Spurs. He then moved to play for Hapoel Gilboa/Afula of Israel in January 2007.

Melzer also played for Artland Dragons in the German Bundesliga.

In July 2009, it was announced that Melzer would return to Australia, to play for the Cairns Taipans. He again won a Player of the Week award, but his form declined during the year and he returned to the United States to play for Rio Grande Valley Vipers in the NBA Development League.

Prior to the 2010–11 season Melzer returned to Israel, and signed with Hapoel Holon, which was coached by Dani Franco (who coached him when he played for Hapoel Gilboa/Afula) and a very successful season leading the league in playoff points per game (28.2ppg).

In June 2011, he signed a contract with the New Yorker Phantoms Braunschweig in the German Bundesliga.

Rich Melzer is the current CEO of YouthLink MN, a nonprofit organization with a 48-year history dedicated to serving young adults in Minneapolis, Minnesota, who are experiencing homelessness and facing barriers to advancement within their community. Prior to his role at YouthLink, Melzer coached varsity basketball at Holy Angels Academy in Richfield, Minnesota, alongside his childhood friend and former NBA star Troy Bell.

In addition to his leadership at YouthLink, Melzer continues to coach youth basketball, currently leading his son's team at Grassroots Sizzle Nation. This program is noteworthy for producing several NBA stars, including Jalen Suggs and Chet Holmgren. Melzer has also made guest appearances on local sports television and radio shows, further contributing to his presence in the community.
