= Basketball Löwen Braunschweig =

Professional basketball team in Braunschweig, Germany

Löwen Braunschweig
- Leagues: BBL
- Founded: 1978; 48 years ago (Note: The organisation was separated from BG Braunschweig in 2000.)
- Arena: Volkswagen Halle
- Capacity: 3,603
- Location: Braunschweig, Germany
- Team colors: Black, gold
- Main sponsor: Hey Car
- President: Sebastian Schmidt
- Head coach: Ramón Díaz Sánchez
- Ownership: Dennis Schröder
- Affiliation: SG Braunschweig
- Website: www.basketball-loewen.de

Basketball Löwen Braunschweig (English: Basketball Lions Braunschweig) is a professional basketball club based in Braunschweig, Germany. The club currently plays in the Basketball Bundesliga, the top tier of German basketball. The club's home arena is Volkswagen Halle. Founded in 2001 as Metabox Braunschweig, the club was established as the separated professional team of SG Braunschweig.

== History ==
The team was formed as a new company in 2000, taking over the Bundesliga license of SG Braunschweig. The newly formed team was named Metabox Braunschweig.

The new name sponsor (Metabox) had to abandon the project after only a couple of months, due to insufficient financial means. The club was saved by the communal sports association and from 2001 up to the end of the 2001–2002 season, it had a new name: StadtSport Braunschweig. In the season 2002–2003, the team played under the new name TXU Energie Braunschweig. In the 2003–2004, the club again was renamed BS Energy Braunschweig. At the end of the 2005 – 2006 season Braunschweig finished the season at the bottom of the table, which usually leads to a team being relegated to the second highest German Basketball League, ProA. The Basketball Bundesliga (Germany's top basketball league) had just committed to expanding the number of teams, so there were two extra wild card slots that could be purchased for an amount of 100.000 Euro. The club's financial resources, however, were rather scarce, due to the lack of success in the previous seasons. Therefore, team was only able to afford the license, because of the help of three sponsors (BS Energy, Öffentliche Braunschweig, Volkswagen Sport Förderung). BS Energy relinquished the right to name the club, but did not reduce the financial support, neither did the other two sponsors.

In the 2006–2007 season, NewYorker, a clothing company from Braunschweig, acquired the naming rights. They narrowed their ideas for a new name down to three options and let the fans vote for a new name for the club. 78% of the fans voted for the name NewYorker Phantoms Braunschweig, a potentially confusing name for the brand that could be mistaken for a team from New York. In the 2009–2010 season, the team reached the 8th seed and the playoffs for the first time in 7 years. After beating the No.1 seed in the quarter finals 3:1, they were swept 3:0 by the Brose Baskets, who went on to win both, the championship and the midseason tournament, the German Cup.

In the Season 2010–2011 the team reached the final-four tournament of the BBL-Pokal, after beating the league rival EWE Baskets Oldenburg 88:76 in the previous round. In the 2011– 2012 season, the Phantoms were able to reach the semi-finals of the league cup (BBL-Pokal) again, but lost to Telekom Baskets Bonn. They finished the regular season as a 7th seed, but were swept by ratiopharm Ulm in the first round of the Playoffs. During the season, the then coach Sebastian Machowski had already announced his resignation for the end of the season. He joined EWE Baskets Oldenburg and was replaced by the Greek coach Kostas Flevarakis.

In the 2011–2012 season, the team was not able to match the performance of the previous seasons. They found themselves at the bottom of the table for the entire season, but were able to escape relegation on the penultimate match day of the season, when they were able to beat the Walter Tigers Tübingen on the road. The biggest positive of that season was the emergence of Dennis Schröder in Braunschweig. His individual performances lead to him being named not only the "best German youth player 2013", but also the "most improved player 2013”. However, head coach Flevarakis was let go after the season. In the 2013–14 season, Raoul Korner became the new Phantoms coach. He had previously been coaching the Dutch team Eiffel Towers Den Bosch. The phantoms finished that season as an 8th seed.

Before the beginning of the 2014–2015 season, the name sponsor New Yorker announced that they were not going to extend their commitment with Braunschweig's basketball team. After that, the team was renamed Basketball Löwen Braunschweig., the new team colors being blue and yellow (previously white/red). After the end of the 2015–2016 season, head coach Raoul Korner left the Basketball Löwen and joined Medi Bayreuth, a German rival. Frank Menz, became his successor. Assembling a roster for the 2016–2017 was rather problematic, due to the lack of funds. So the team went into the season with low expectations that were proven adequate, after they finished the season with merely six wins, which should have led to them being relegated to the second highest German basketball league, ProA. But, since the league rival Phoenix Hagen had to file for bankruptcy, an additional spot in Germany's first league became available for the Basketball Löwen.

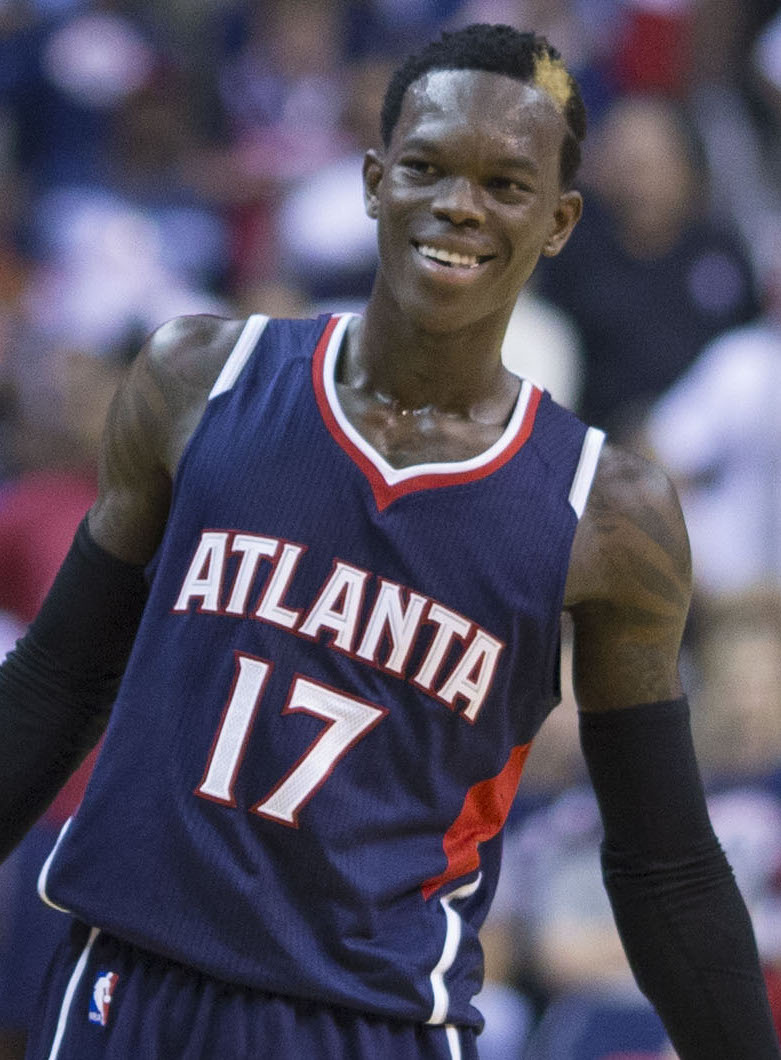
NBA player Dennis Schröder, owner of the team since 2018

In February 2018, the then established NBA player Dennis Schröder, who was born and raised in Braunschweig, indicated interest to become a shareholder of the team and vowed to lead them into the top five of Germany. In March of the same year, it was officially announced that Schröder would become a shareholder/partner of the operating company that ran the team. Since the season 2018–19, Dennis Schröder has been the majority shareholder of the Basketball Löwen Braunschweig. In that season the team was able to reach the playoffs as the 8th seed but were swept 0:3 by Bayern Munich.

Despite the first playoff berth since the 2011–2012 season, the head coach Frank Menz left the Basketball Löwen after three seasons. The Austrian-American Coach Peter Strobl was then hired to coach the team in the 2019–2020 season.

On 1 July 2020, Schröder became the sole owner of Braunschweig after purchasing the remaining 30% of shares. On 24 August 2020, the club revealed its new logo and club colours black and gold.

In the 2024-2025 season Braunschweig will attend the FIBA Europe Cup, which will be the team’s first international competition in over 20 years.

== Sponsorship names ==
Logo of the team as New Yorker Phantoms

Partly due to sponsorship reasons, the club has been known under several names:

- Basketball Löwen Braunschweig (2014–present)
- New Yorker Phantoms Braunschweig (2006–2014)
- BS Energy Braunschweig (2003–2006)
- TXU Energie Braunschweig (2002–2003)
- StadtSport Braunschweig (2001–2002)
- Metabox Braunschweig (2000–2001)

== Club identity ==
Logo used until 2020

The logo of the club features a lion.

== Arena ==
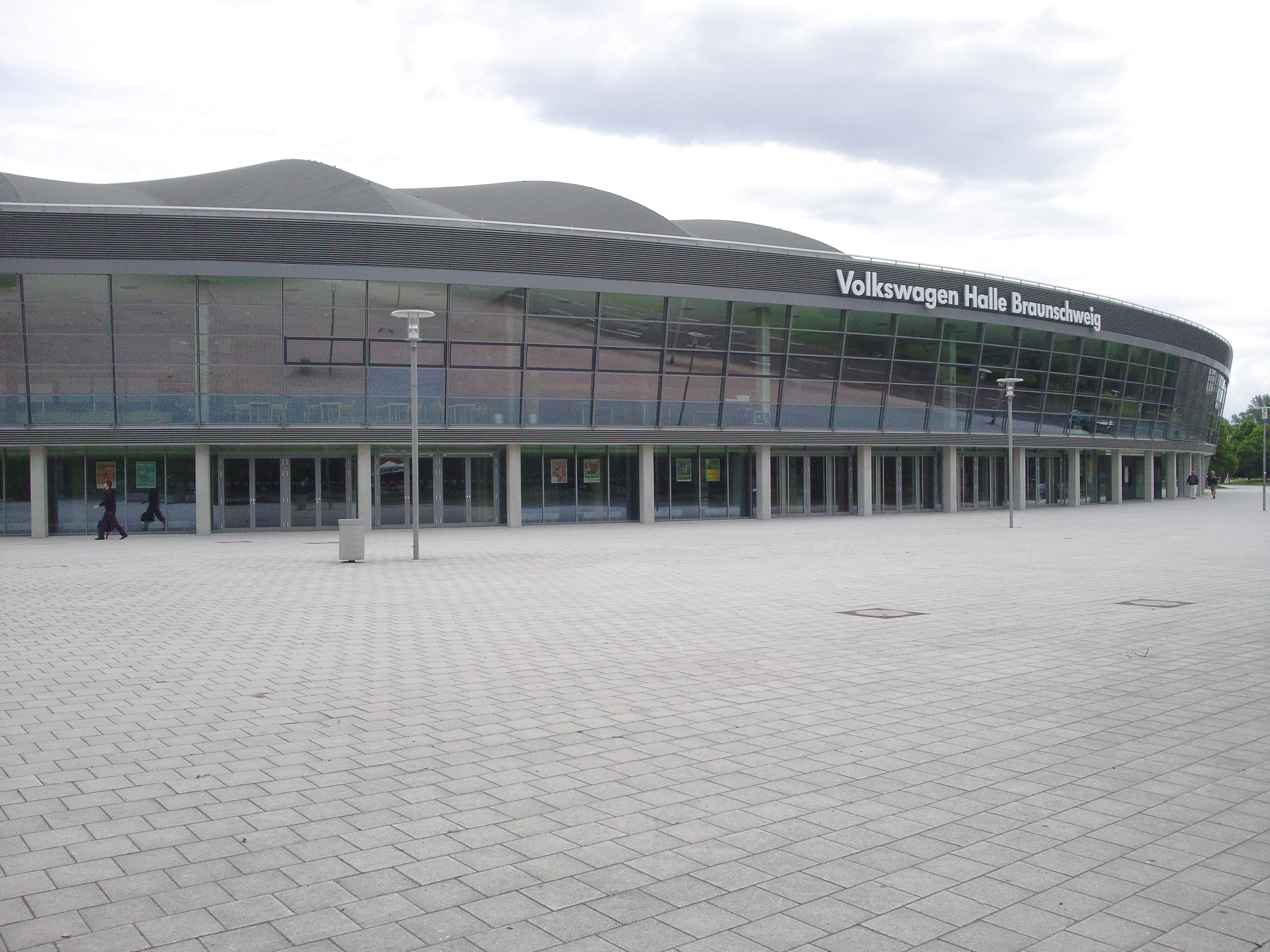
Volkswagen Halle

The Löwen's home games take place at the 3,603 seat Volkswagen Halle, which opened in 2000. The team's predecessor SG Braunschweig had previously hosted its games at the 1,500 seat Sporthalle Alte Waage.

== Farm team ==
From 2000 to 2015, SG Braunschweig, playing in the 2. Basketball Bundesliga respectively ProB, served as the club's farm team. In 2015, SG Braunschweig entered into a cooperation with MTV Herzöge Wolfenbüttel. Starting with the 2015–16 ProB season, both clubs will field a joint team which will play in Wolfenbüttel and serve as a farm team for the Basketball Löwen Braunschweig.

== Team ==
=== Current roster ===
Basketball Löwen Braunschweig roster
Players
Coaches

Pos.	No.	Nat.	Name	Ht.	Wt.	Age
F/C	0	(Sweden)	Bangala, Zaba	2.02 m (6 ft 8 in)	121 kg (267 lb)	24 – 13 November 2001
G/F	2	(Germany)	Schröder, Benny	2.01 m (6 ft 7 in)	93 kg (205 lb)	23 – 28 August 2003
G	3	(United States)	Reaves, DeJour	1.83 m (6 ft 0 in)	79 kg (174 lb)	24 – 10 September 2002
G	4	(Germany)	Aydinoglu, Gian	1.89 m (6 ft 2 in)	80 kg (176 lb)	23 – 31 May 2003
G	5	(United States)	Askew, Devin	1.92 m (6 ft 4 in)	88 kg (194 lb)	24 – 26 July 2002
G	6	(Germany)	Zylka, Ferdinand	1.91 m (6 ft 3 in)	94 kg (207 lb)	28 – 11 April 1998
F/C	7	(Germany)	Gürbüzer, Cavit	2.05 m (6 ft 9 in)	90 kg (198 lb)	19 – 2 August 2007
G/F	9	(Germany)	Ewelt, Luca Joe	1.98 m (6 ft 6 in)	86 kg (190 lb)	22 – 20 July 2004
G	10	(Germany)	Römer, Lennart	1.86 m (6 ft 1 in)	80 kg (176 lb)	19 – 4 April 2007
F	11	(Germany)	Holloway, Romario	2.03 m (6 ft 8 in)	95 kg (209 lb)	21 – 7 April 2005
G	13	(United States)	Edwards, Sheldon	1.91 m (6 ft 3 in)	83 kg (183 lb)	26 – 13 August 2000
F	20	(Germany)	Eklou, Noah	2.00 m (6 ft 7 in)	96 kg (212 lb)	17 – 29 August 2009
F	21	(Germany)	Laar, Leonhard	2.04 m (6 ft 8 in)	95 kg (209 lb)	20 – 25 September 2006
F/C	22	(Chile)	Haase, Felipe	2.06 m (6 ft 9 in)	111 kg (245 lb)	28 – 19 May 1998
F/C	27	(Germany)	Edigin, Eddy	2.03 m (6 ft 8 in)	115 kg (254 lb)	31 – 17 October 1995
F	30	(United States)	Flanigan, Chip	1.98 m (6 ft 6 in)	96 kg (212 lb)	30 – 10 April 1996
G	41	(Germany)	Edigin, Esli	1.94 m (6 ft 4 in)	90 kg (198 lb)	21 – 11 April 2005
F	52	(Germany)	Wahren, Christopher	2.05 m (6 ft 9 in)	85 kg (187 lb)	19 – 25 June 2007
F	55	(United States)	Green, Tajh	2.03 m (6 ft 8 in)	92 kg (203 lb)	28 – 18 May 1998

Head coach

- (Spain) Ramón Díaz Sánchez

Assistant coach(es)

- (Belgium) Ferried Naciri
- (United States) Keith Thomas
- (Romania) Liviu Calin

Legend

- (C) Team captain
- (DP) Development player
- Injured

- Roster
Updated: September 30, 2026

=== Notable players ===
Note: Flags indicate national team eligibility at FIBA-sanctioned events. Players may hold other non-FIBA nationalities not displayed.

Criteria

To appear in this section a player must have either:

- Set a club record or won an individual award while at the club
- Played at least one official international match for their national team at any time
- Played at least one official NBA match at any time.

- (Germany) Peter Fehse
- (Germany) Nils Mittmann
- (Germany) Heiko Schaffartzik
- (Germany) Dennis Schröder
- (Germany) Daniel Theis
- (United States) John Allen
- (Canada) Jermaine Anderson
- (Angola) Jilson Bango
- (Czech Republic) Luboš Bartoň
- (Montenegro) Milko Bjelica
- (United Kingdom) Eric Boateng
- (United States) John Celestand
- (Canada) Aaron Doornekamp
- (United States) Steve Goodrich
- (United States) Marcus Goree
- (United States) LaMarr Greer
- (United States) Chris Herren
- (Lithuania) Žygimantas Janavičius
- (Serbia) Branko Jorović
- (United States) Demond Mallet
- (United States) Terrell McIntyre
- (United States) Rich Melzer
- (Latvia) Igors Miglinieks
- (Sweden) Barra Njie
- (Nigeria) Tony Skinn
- (Poland) Szymon Szewczyk
- (Nigeria) Michael Umeh
- (Latvia) Artūrs Žagars

=== Notable coaches ===
- (Finland) Henrik Dettmann
- (Greece) Kostas Flevarakis
- (Germany) Sebastian Machowski
- (Bosnia and Herzegovina) Emir Mutapčić

== Season by season ==
Season	Tier	League	Pos.	German Cup	European competitions	
2000–01	1	Bundesliga	6th			
2001–02	1	Bundesliga	10th		3 Korać Cup	PR
2002–03	1	Bundesliga	3rd			
2003–04	1	Bundesliga	11th		2 ULEB Cup	RS
2004–05	1	Bundesliga	12th		3 FIBA Europe League	GS
2005–06	1	Bundesliga	16th^{1}			
2006–07	1	Bundesliga	14th			
2007–08	1	Bundesliga	9th			
2008–09	1	Bundesliga	13th			
2009–10	1	Bundesliga	4th			
2010–11	1	Bundesliga	5th	Runner-up		
2011–12	1	Bundesliga	7th	Fourth place		
2012–13	1	Bundesliga	13th			
2013–14	1	Bundesliga	15th			
2014–15	1	Bundesliga	9th			
2015–16	1	Bundesliga	10th			
2016–17	1	Bundesliga	16th			
2017–18	1	Bundesliga	12th			
2018–19	1	Bundesliga	8th	Quarterfinals		
2019–20	1	Bundesliga	11th	Quarterfinals		
2020–21	1	Bundesliga	9th	Group stage		
2021–22	1	Bundesliga	13th	Semifinals		
2022–23	1	Bundesliga	14th	Round of 16		
2023–24	1	Bundesliga	12th	Round of 16		
2024–25	1	Bundesliga	5th	Round of 16	FIBA Europe Cup	RS
2025–26	1	Bundesliga	17th	Round of 16	Champions League	Q
2025–26	1	Bundesliga	17th	Round of 16	FIBA Europe Cup	RS
2026–27	1	Bundesliga		Round of 16		

^1 Braunschweig was spared relegation due to the expansion of the Basketball Bundesliga from 16 to 18 teams for the 2006–07 season.
