= Vitor Galvani =

Brazilian basketball coach (born 1992)

Mexico City Capitanes
- Position: Head coach
- League: NBA G League

Personal information
- Born: 1 September 1992 (age 34) Campinas, São Paulo, Brazil
- Coaching career: 2011–present

Career history

Coaching
- 2011–2017: Reserve teams of Joinville Basquete Associados
- 2018: Reserve teams of Campinas Basquete Clube
- 2019–2021: Reserve teams of Corinthians
- 2021–2022: Brazil (Assistant)
- 2022: Brazil U-18
- 2022: Cleveland Cavaliers (Assistant)
- 2022–2023: Mexico City Capitanes (Assistant)
- 2024: Pinheiros
- 2025–: Mexico City Capitanes

Career highlights
- NBA G League Coach of the Year (2026)

Vitor Galvani (born 1 September 1992) is a Brazilian basketball coach. He is the head coach of the Mexico City Capitanes.

== Coaching career ==
Galvani started his coaching career in 2011 as part of the reserve teams of Joinville Basquete Associados. In 2022 he was appointed as head coach of Brazil U-18. In the same year he participated in the 2022 NBA Summer League being part of the staff of Cleveland Cavaliers. On 2024, he signed with Pinheiros of Novo Basquete Brasil. In 2025, he was named head coach of Mexico City Capitanes of NBA G League.
