= Nils Mittmann =

German basketball player (born 1979)

Weißenhorn Youngstars
- Position: Power forward / small forward
- League: ProB

Personal information
- Born: April 10, 1979 (age 47) Braunschweig, West Germany
- Listed height: 6 ft 7 in (2.01 m)

Career information
- Playing career: 1998–present

Career history
- 1998–2000: SG Braunschweig
- 2000–2001: Met@box Braunschweig
- 2001–2003: ratiopharm Ulm
- 2003–2005: TSK Würzburg
- 2005–2008: EnBW Ludwigsburg
- 2008–2013: New Yorker Phantoms Braunschweig
- 2013–2014: Walter Tigers Tübingen
- 2014–present: Weißenhorn Youngstars

Nils Mittmann (born 10 April 1979) is a German professional basketball player.

== Career ==
Mittmann played 14 seasons in the German Basketball Bundesliga for the clubs New Yorker Phantoms Braunschweig, TSK Würzburg, EnBW Ludwigsburg, and Walter Tigers Tübingen. He retired from full-time professional basketball in 2014, but continues to play for the Weißenhorn Youngstars in the third-tier ProB.
