= Chad Baker-Mazara =

Dominican basketball player (born 2000)

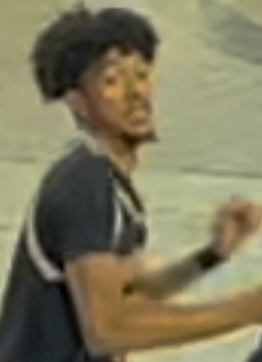
- Baker-Mazara in 2025

No. 4 – Mexico City Capitanes
- Position: Small forward / shooting guard
- League: NBA G League

Personal information
- Born: January 27, 2000 (age 26) Santo Domingo, Dominican Republic
- Listed height: 6 ft 7 in (2.01 m)
- Listed weight: 172 lb (78 kg)

Career information
- High school: Colonia (Woodbridge Township, New Jersey); SPIRE Academy (Geneva, Ohio)
- College: Duquesne (2020–2021); San Diego State (2021–2022); Northwest Florida State (2022–2023); Auburn (2023–2025); USC (2025–2026)
- NBA draft: 2026: undrafted
- Playing career: 2026–present

Career history
- 2026: Gigantes de Carolina
- 2026–present: Mexico City Capitanes

Career highlights
- Third-team All-SEC (2025); MWC Sixth Man of the Year (2022)

Chad Baker-Mazara (born January 27, 2000) is a Dominican basketball player for the Mexico City Capitanes of the NBA G League. He played college basketball for the Duquesne Dukes, San Diego State Aztecs, Northwest Florida State Raiders, Auburn Tigers, and USC Trojans.

== Early life and high school ==
Baker-Mazara was born on January 27, 2000, in Santo Domingo, Dominican Republic, to Derrek Baker and Carmen Mazara. His father played college basketball at South Carolina State in 1984–85 before playing and coaching overseas. Baker-Mazara moved to the United States to live with his grandfather, Bailey Baker, prior to his junior year of high school.

After moving to the Colonia section of Woodbridge Township, New Jersey in 2017, Baker-Mazara played two seasons of high school basketball at Colonia High School. As a senior, he averaged 18.9 points, 8.7 rebounds, 2.4 assists, 2.1 steals, and 1.7 blocks per game and was named the Home News Tribune Player of the Year. Baker-Mazara also earned an invite to the NJSCA Senior Boys All-Star Game. He went on to play a postgraduate year at SPIRE Academy in Geneva, Ohio, helping the team to a 23–4 record. Baker-Mazara originally committed to play college basketball at Mississippi Valley State before flipping to Duquesne.

== College career ==
=== Duquesne ===
As a freshman in 2020–21, Baker-Mazara appeared in 15 games and made 13 starts, where he averaged 9.5 points on 43.8 percent shooting. After the season, he entered his name into the NCAA transfer portal.

=== San Diego State ===
Baker-Mazara transferred to play for the San Diego State Aztecs. In 2021–22, he averaged 6.4 points and 2.0 rebounds in 31 games, earning Mountain West Conference sixth man of the year honors. After the season, Baker-Mazara once again entered his name into the NCAA transfer portal.

=== Northwest Florida State College ===
Baker-Mazara transferred to play at Northwest Florida State College. In 2022–23, he averaged 15.2 points, 3.6 rebounds, and 2.1 assists for the Raiders on 46.9 percent three-point shooting.

=== Auburn ===
Baker-Mazara transferred to play for the Auburn Tigers. On February 24, 2024, he put up 25 points in a win over Georgia. During the 2023–24 season, Baker-Mazara appeared in 35 games with nine starts, where he averaged 10.0 points, 3.7 rebounds, and over two assists per game. On February 4, 2025, he totaled 15 points in a win over Oklahoma. On February 11, Baker-Mazara came off the bench for the first time that season, where he played 28 minutes while putting up four assists, two rebounds and two steals in a win over Vanderbilt. On February 15, he scored 15 points in a win over rival Alabama. On February 19, Baker-Mazara dropped 15 points in a win over Arkansas. For his performance during the 2024–25 season, he was named one of the five finalists for the Julius Erving Award.

=== USC ===
Baker-Mazara transferred to play for the USC Trojans in his final collegiate year. On March 1, 2026, when Baker-Mazara was 26, USC announced he was no longer on the team. The school later claimed that the dismissal was due to Baker-Mazara violating a "morals clause". Baker-Mazara later sued USC and coach Eric Musselman, claiming that he was dismissed in order for USC to avoid paying him the remainder of his NIL contract.

== Professional career ==
Baker-Mazara was chosen first overall in the 2026 Baloncesto Superior Nacional (BSN) draft by the Gigantes de Carolina.

On September 9, 2026, Mexico City Capitanes of the NBA G League announced the addition of Chad Baker-Mazara, making him the first player announced by the team for the 2026–27 season.
