= Joaquín Villanueva (basketball) =

Mexican basketball player (born 1986)

Personal information
- Born: 10 March 1986 (age 40) Mexico City, Mexico
- Listed height: 6 ft 9 in (2.06 m)
- Listed weight: 200 lb (91 kg)
- Position: Head coach

Career history

Playing
- 2012–2015: Pioneros de Quintana Roo
- 2016: Caballeros de Culiacán
- 2016: Garzas Guerreras UATX
- 2017: Aguacateros de Michoacán
- 2018–2020: Mineros de Zacatecas
- 2021: Dorados de Chihuahua
- 2022: Mineros de Zacatecas
- 2023: Halcones Rojos Veracruz

Coaching
- 2025: Rayos de Hermosillo
- 2026: Mexico City Capitanes

Joaquín Villanueva Lozano (born 10 March 1986) is a Mexican former professional basketball player and current assistant coach of Mexico City Capitanes.

== Career ==
Villanueva made his debut in 2012 season with the Pioneros de Quintana Roo to play in the LNBP, then in 2016 he made his debut in Caballeros de Culiacán in the CIBACOPA league. He also played in the Mineros de Zacatecas and in the Halcones Rojos Veracruz of the same league.

== Coaching career ==
He started his coaching career in 2025 with Rayos de Hermosillo.
