= Mexico City Capitanes =

Mexican basketball club

- 2025–26 NBA G League season
- Conference: Western
- League: Liga Nacional de Baloncesto Profesional; 2017–2020; NBA G League; 2021–present
- Founded: 2017
- History: Capitanes de la Ciudad de México; 2017–present
- Arena: Mexico City Arena
- Capacity: 22,300
- Location: Mexico City, Mexico
- Team colors: Blue, yellow, pink
- Main sponsor: AT&T
- President: Carlos Tostado
- General manager: Orlando Méndez-Valdez
- Head coach: Vitor Galvani
- Ownership: Moisés Cosío; Gil Hernández; Rodrigo Trujillo; Patricio Garza; Ryan Gilbert
- Website: capitanes.gleague.nba.com
| Home | Away |

The Mexico City Capitanes (Spanish: Capitanes de la Ciudad de México) are a Mexican professional basketball team of the NBA G League based in Mexico City. The Capitanes competed as a member club in the Liga Nacional de Baloncesto Profesional (LNBP) for its first three seasons and then became a member of the NBA G League. The team plays its home games at Mexico City Arena.

The Capitanes were established before the 2017–18 season, after the Mexican capital had been without a basketball team for a decade.

In December 2019, the National Basketball Association's commissioner Adam Silver announced that the Capitanes would be joining the league's developmental league, the NBA G League, for at least five seasons beginning in the 2020–21 season. However, following the effects of the COVID-19 pandemic, no mention was made of the Capitanes participating in the league's 2021 bubble season, with the team announcing it would instead join in the 2021–22 season.

== History ==
=== Foundation ===
The Mexican capital had lacked a competitive basketball team for a decade. In an attempt of reanimating the passion for basketball in Mexico City, a group of investors led by Moisés Cosío, announced the foundation of this new franchise. The group of investors accepted that the situation was challenging but Jordi Funtanet, the director of marketing and communications for the new team said that it was also a very big opportunity. It was the first Liga Nacional de Baloncesto Profesional (LNBP) team not economically linked to the Mexican government and with total private investment.

The players brought into this new franchise were to be a base from the national team, and more experienced players from abroad.

=== The first seasons at the LNBP ===
The management stated that the team's goal for the season was to qualify for the playoffs with an aim for at least the semifinals. The head coach for the season was the Spaniard Ramón Díaz, who had previously been involved with the National Team, as an assistant coach. The state of the Gimnasium was improved, including dressing rooms, and the playing surface.

Their first preseason game ended in defeat against an amateur side. Their first official game was played on October 13, and ended in a 90–87 win for the Capitanes, against the Aguacateros de Michoacán. Their first season went well; they won 21 out of their first 30 matches, with an offense commanded by Pedro Meza, Fernando Bénitez, and Emmanuel Ándujar, who all received call-ups to the All Star game in early December, along with head coach Ramón Díaz. By the end of the season, the Capitanes would not only reach their goal of making it to the Playoffs and reach the semifinals after beating the Correbasket UAT 3–2, but would reach as far as the championship round after beating Fuerza Regia de Monterrey 4–1. However, they would fall short in winning the LNBP championship by losing to the Soles de Mexicali 4–1.

In their second season of existence, the Capitanes would not only finish the season with a slightly better overall record at 27–13 (which left them with the best record in the LNBP this time around), but they also would repeat their return to the LNBP championship round after not only sweeping the Abejas de León in the first round, but also avenging their championship series loss against the Soles by winning 4–2 in the semifinal round. However, they once again fell short in winning the championship after Fuerza Regia de Monterrey would avenge their playoff loss to the Capitanes last season by winning the championship 4–2.

For what turned out to be their final season at the LNBP, the Capitanes would finish with a slightly worst regular season record than their first two seasons of existence at 25–11, which was still good enough for a second-place finish. However, unlike their first two seasons, the Capitanes would end up bowing out of the league entirely by losing to the Aguacateros de Michoacán 4–1 in the quarterfinals round.

=== NBA G League ===
In December 2019, commissioner Adam Silver of the National Basketball Association (NBA) announced Capitanes were joining the NBA G League. The initial plan was starting from the 2020–21 season, the team would play in the G League for five seasons in order to test the potential market of a future Mexico-based NBA team and be the first team outside the United States and Canada. However, due the restrictions in place during the COVID-19 pandemic, the season was postponed and eventually played at a single site in Orlando, Florida, for an abbreviated 2021 season without the Capitanes. The team announced it still planned to join the G League in 2021–22, with five seasons in the G League still planned to be under way for the Capitanes. On May 7, 2021, Nick Lagios was named the team's general manager. Due to the ongoing travel restrictions during the pandemic, the Capitanes were only scheduled to play 12 games in the 2021 G League Showcase Cup with all games in the United States. The team was temporarily based in Fort Worth, Texas, for the season so players did not have to cross the border during the restrictions, though they would have different, temporary home arenas set up for that season for an equivalent of home games with the Landers Center in Southaven, Mississippi, the Bert Ogden Arena in Edinburg, Texas far south of Fort Worth, the Greensboro Coliseum Complex in Greensboro, North Carolina, and the Michelob Ultra Arena in Las Vegas, Nevada.

On November 5, 2021, the Capitanes defeated the Memphis Hustle 95–90 in their first official G League game. During their inaugural G League season, three of the Capitanes' players were called up to NBA teams: Gary Clark to the New Orleans Pelicans, Alfonzo McKinnie to the Chicago Bulls, and Matt Mooney to the New York Knicks. However, the Capitanes finished their shortened season with a 4–8 record, failing to qualify for the Showcase Cup tournament. They would also play a couple of exhibition matches against the NBA G League Ignite, a G League developmental team that joined the G League a season prior with a primary purpose of developing younger prospects to be NBA quality players someday, around the start of 2022.

In their first full, proper season in the NBA G League, the Capitanes would blowout the Rio Grande Valley Vipers 120–84 in their first official G League game played in Mexico's Arena Ciudad de México after playing their entire previous season in the U.S.A. due to the long-term effects of the COVID-19 pandemic. The Capitanes would later end up having the second-best record of the entire South division of the Showcase Cup standings, behind the College Park Skyhawks. Despite that feat, however, they would fail to reach the Showcase Cup tournament due to tiebreaker rules. Furthermore, due to tiebreakers rules, the Capitanes would miss out on reaching the G League playoffs properly for the first time in franchise history due to them losing tiebreaker results to the Santa Cruz Warriors and the Rio Grande Valley Vipers.

In their third official season in the G League, the Capitanes would select Malique Lewis from Trinidad and Tobago as the #1 pick from the international draft, as well as finish the Showcase Cup Tournament with a worse record than last season by having a 9–7 finish. However, because the Capitanes won more tiebreakers and more teams finished with poorer records by comparison this season, the Capitanes would qualify for the Showcase Cup Tournament properly as the #7 seed. Once there, they would compete against the #2 seed Westchester Knicks, losing to them 114–104, with Westchester eventually being the champions of the Showcase Cup Tournament this season. Once that concluded, the Capitanes would complete the regular season with an improved record from last season by having a 19–15 finish, which would be good enough for an overall 8th-place finish. However, that would not be enough for them to qualify for the playoffs this season once again.

For their fourth official season in the G League, the Capitanes would acquire former NBA G League Ignite player Dink Pate to further help bolster up their roster. Pate was projected to be a late first to second round selection for the 2025 NBA draft and would have been the Capitanes' first ever player taken directly from them by the NBA draft if his projections held firm at the time, but he ultimately went undrafted during the entire event.

On November 12, 2026, the Capitanes announced that fintech investor Ryan Gilbert, founder of Launchpad Capital, had joined the franchise's ownership group as a co-owner alongside majority shareholder Moisés Cosío and founding partners Gil Hernández, Rodrigo Trujillo, and Patricio Garza. The investment is aimed at driving technological development and expanding the team's commercial reach among Hispanic and Latino audiences in the United States.

== Logo and uniforms ==
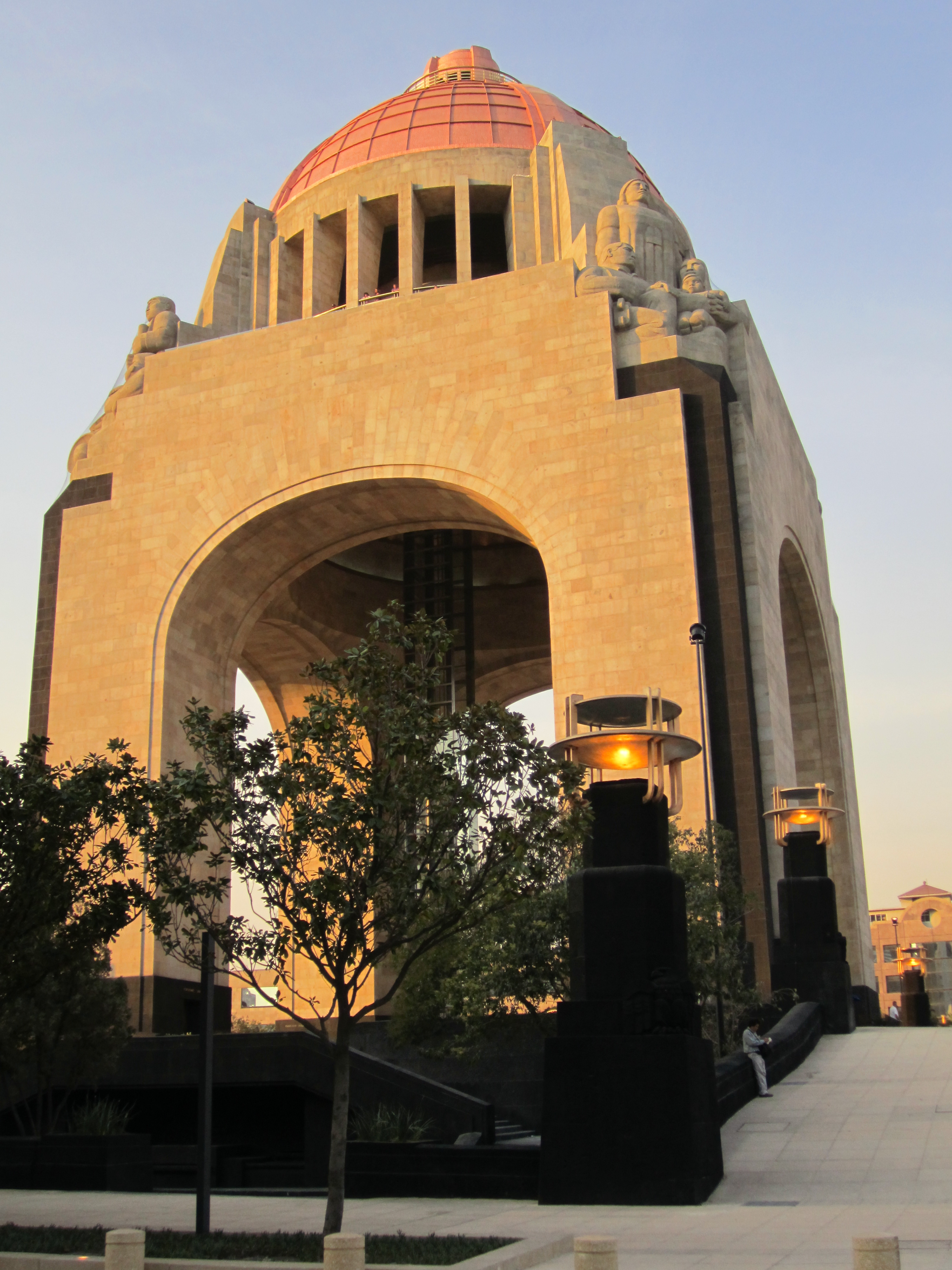
The landmark, upon which the logo was based.

The Capitanes colors consist of blue, white, and yellow. The home uniforms consist of a blue jersey with an embroidered yellow outline and yellow lines in the sides along with blue shorts with yellow lines in the bottoms. The away uniforms consist of a white jersey with an embroidered blue outline and blue lines in the sides along with white shorts with blue lines in the bottoms. The alternate color is yellow, with blue embroidered in the neck, sides and bottoms.

The team's logo consists of a yellow and blue rendering of the Monumento a la Revolución, a landmark of Mexico City, with the word Capitanes underneath it, and Ciudad de México in smaller type.

== Home arena ==
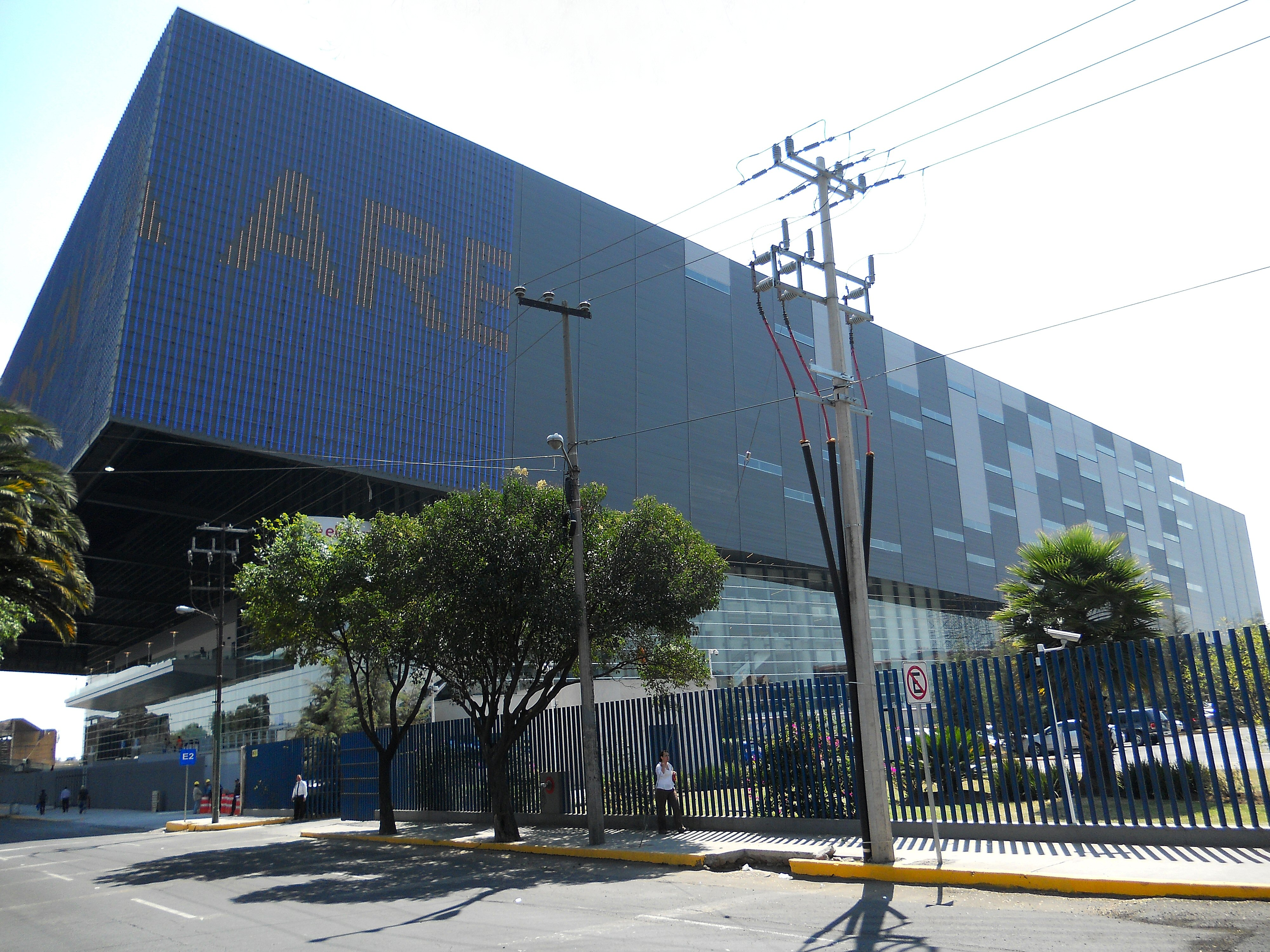
The Capitanes home arena

The Gimnasio Olímpico Juan de la Barrera in Mexico City was the home arena for the team between 2017 and 2020. The venue hosted volleyball at the 1968 Summer Olympics.

For the Capitanes' first season in the NBA G League, the 2021–22 saw them temporarily stationed at Fort Worth, Texas in order to play any games at all during the season due to the ongoing effects of the COVID-19 pandemic. However, they would not play any games at Fort Worth at all, with home games situated for them this season being held at the Landers Center (home of the Memphis Hustle), the Bert Ogden Arena (home of the Rio Grande Valley Vipers), the Greensboro Coliseum Complex (home of the Greensboro Swarm), and the Michelob Ultra Arena (which hosts the Showcase Cup Tournament, as well as held the NBA G League Ignite for their home games during the season).

Mexico City Arena hosted the team's home games starting with the NBA G League's 2022–23 season onward. The arena can hold 22,300 spectators, but usually seating a maximum of 8,000 for Capitanes games.

Mexican fans call Mexico City Arena "Territorio Capitan" (Captain Territory).

== Season by season ==
The following is an overview of all seasons of Capitanes, including performance in national playoffs and international competitions:

| Champions | Runners-up | Playoff berth |

| Season | Tier | League | Finish | Wins | Losses | Win% | Playoffs | International competitions / Showcase Cup Tournament | Head coach |
|---|---|---|---|---|---|---|---|---|---|
Mexico City Capitanes
| 2017–18 | 1 | LNBP | 2nd | 26 | 14 | .650 | Won quarterfinals (Correcaminos, 3–2); Won semifinals (Fuerza Regia, 4–1); Lost finals (Soles, 1–4) | | Ramón Díaz Sánchez |
| 2018–19 | 1 | LNBP | 1st | 27 | 13 | .675 | Won quarterfinals (Abejas, 4–0); Won semifinals (Soles, 4–2); Lost finals (Fuerza Regia, 2–4) | FIBA Americas League; Fourth Place | Ramón Díaz Sánchez |
| 2019–20 | 1 | LNBP | 2nd | 25 | 11 | .694 | Lost quarterfinals (Aguacateros, 1–4) | BCL Americas; Group Stage | Ramón Díaz Sánchez |
| 2020–21 | – | NBA G League | Sat out of the season due to the COVID-19 pandemic | | | | | | Ramón Díaz Sánchez |
| 2021–22 | – | NBA G League | 7th | 4 | 8 | .333 | Did not qualify | | Ramón Díaz Sánchez |
| 2022–23 | – | NBA G League | 8th | 18 | 14 | .563 | Did not qualify | | Ramón Díaz Sánchez |
| 2023–24 | – | NBA G League | 8th | 19 | 15 | .559 | Did not qualify | Showcase Cup Tournament; Lost quarterfinals (Westchester, 104–114) | Ramón Díaz Sánchez |
| 2024–25 | – | NBA G League | 10th | 16 | 18 | .471 | Did not qualify | | Ramón Díaz Sánchez |
| 2025-26 | – | NBA G League | 1st | 24 | 12 | .667 | Lost first round (Rip City Remix, 113-108) | | Vitor Galvani |

== Current roster ==
Mexico City Capitanes roster
Players

| Pos. | No. | Player | Height | Weight | DOB | From |
|---|---|---|---|---|---|---|
| G | 1 | David Sloan | 6 ft 0 in (1.83 m) | 180 lb (82 kg) | 1999-05-26 | East Tennessee State |
| G | 2 | James Bouknight | 6 ft 4 in (1.93 m) | 189 lb (86 kg) | 2000-09-18 | Connecticut |
| G | 3 | Tae Dozier | 6 ft 5 in (1.96 m) | 170 lb (77 kg) | 2003-15-10 | Northern Kentucky |
| G/F | 4 | Chad Baker-Mazara | 6 ft 7 in (2.01 m) | 172 lb (78 kg) | 1995-09-28 | USC |
| G | 5 | Zeke Mayo | 6 ft 4 in (1.93 m) | 185 lb (84 kg) | 2002-12-18 | Kansas |
| C | 11 | Tomás Chapero | 6 ft 10 in (2.08 m) | 192 lb (87 kg) | 2001-06-10 | Argentina |
| PF | 23 | Terri Miller Jr. | 6 ft 8 in (2.03 m) | 250 lb (113 kg) | 2003-04-03 | Portland State |
| SG | 25 | Luke Martinez | 6 ft 4 in (1.93 m) | 194 lb (88 kg) | 1990-08-24 | Wyoming |
| C | 30 | Rafael Castro | 6 ft 10 in (2.08 m) | 224 lb (102 kg) | 2003-03-30 | George Washington |
| SF | 33 | Agapy Santos | 6 ft 7 in (2.01 m) | 187 lb (85 kg) | 2003-02-09 | Brazil |
| G | 35 | Quinn Denker | 6 ft 3 in (1.91 m) | 190 lb (86 kg) | 2001-03-14 | Northern Colorado |
| G | 88 | Danier Rivera | 6 ft 7 in (2.01 m) | 215 lb (98 kg) | 2002-01-01 | Bryant |

Coaches
Head coach
- (Brazil) Vitor Galvani
Assistant(s)
- (Venezuela) Danny Soto
- (Argentina) Tomás Lamas
- (Mexico) Joaquín Villanueva

Legend
- (DP) Unsigned draft pick
- (FA) Free agent
- (S) Suspended
- (P) Prospects
- (NBA) On assignment from NBA affiliate
- (TW) Two-way affiliate player
- Injured

Roster
Updated: November 5, 2026

== Notable players ==
- (Brazil) Bruno Caboclo
- (Dominican Republic) (United States) L. J. Figueroa
- (Dominican Republic) Luis Flores
- (Dominican Republic) David Jones
- (Dominican Republic) Luis Montero
- (Haiti) Skal Labissière
- (Mexico) Moisés Andriassi
- (Mexico) Fernando Benítez
- (Mexico) Jorge Gutiérrez
- (Mexico) Juan Toscano-Anderson
- (United States) Greg Brown III
- (United States) Boo Buie
- (United States) Trey Burke
- (United States) Michael Carter-Williams
- (United States) Ahmad Caver
- (United States) Gary Clark
- (United States) Tyler Davis
- (United States) C. J. Elleby
- (United States) Kenneth Faried
- (United States) Louis King
- (United States) Skylar Mays
- (United States) Matt Mooney
- (United States) Shabazz Napier
- (United States) Jahlil Okafor
- (United States) Dink Pate
- (United States) Davon Reed
- (United States) Wade Taylor IV
- (United States) Justin Wright-Foreman

== Head coaches ==
Overview of Mexico City Capitanes coaches
| Head coach | Term | Regular season | | | | Playoffs | | | |
| Head coach | Term | G | W | L | Win% | G | W | L | Win% |
|---|---|---|---|---|---|---|---|---|---|
| Ramón Díaz Sánchez | 2017–2025 | | | | – | — | — | — | — |
| Vitor Galvani | 2025–present | | | | – | | | | – |

== In international competitions ==
Champions Runners-up Third place Fourth place

| Year | Competition | Round | W | L | W% |
|---|---|---|---|---|---|
| 2019 | FIBA Americas League | Fourth Place | 2 | 3 | .400 |
| 2019–20 | BCL Americas | Group Stage | 1 | 3 | .250 |
| Total | 0 Titles | | 3 | 6 | .333 |
