= List of Panama Metro stations =

This is a list of Panama Metro stations, excluding abandoned, projected, planned stations, and those under construction.

== List of active stations ==
Line	Name	Transfer	Opened
Line 1	Albrook		5 April 2014
Line 1	5 de Mayo		5 April 2014
Line 1	Lotería		27 August 2014
Line 1	Santo Tomás		5 April 2014
Line 1	Iglesia del Carmen		5 April 2014
Line 1	Vía Argentina		5 April 2014
Line 1	Fernández de Córdoba		5 April 2014
Line 1	El Ingenio		8 May 2015
Line 1	12 de Octubre		5 April 2014
Line 1	Pueblo Nuevo		5 April 2014
Line 1 Line 2	San Miguelito	Interchange between Line 1 and Line 2	5 April 2014; 25 April 2019
Line 1	Pan de Azúcar		5 April 2014
Line 1	Los Andes		5 April 2014
Line 1	San Isidro		15 August 2015
Line 1	Villa Zaita		25 April 2024
Line 2	Paraíso		25 April 2019
Line 2	Cincuentenario		25 April 2019
Line 2	Villa Lucre		25 April 2019
Line 2	El Crisol		25 April 2019
Line 2	Brisas del Golf		25 April 2019
Line 2	Cerro Viento		25 April 2019
Line 2	San Antonio		25 April 2019
Line 2	Pedregal		25 April 2019
Line 2	Don Bosco		25 April 2019
Line 2	Corredor Sur		25 April 2019
Line 2	Las Mañanitas		25 April 2019
Line 2	Hospital del Este		25 April 2019
Line 2	Altos de Tocumen		25 April 2019
Line 2	24 de Diciembre		25 April 2019
Line 2	Nuevo Tocumen		25 April 2019
El Ramal Line 2	ITSE		16 March 2023
El Ramal Line 2	Aeropuerto		16 March 2023
