= Cerro Viento metro station =

Panama metro station

Estación Cerro Viento
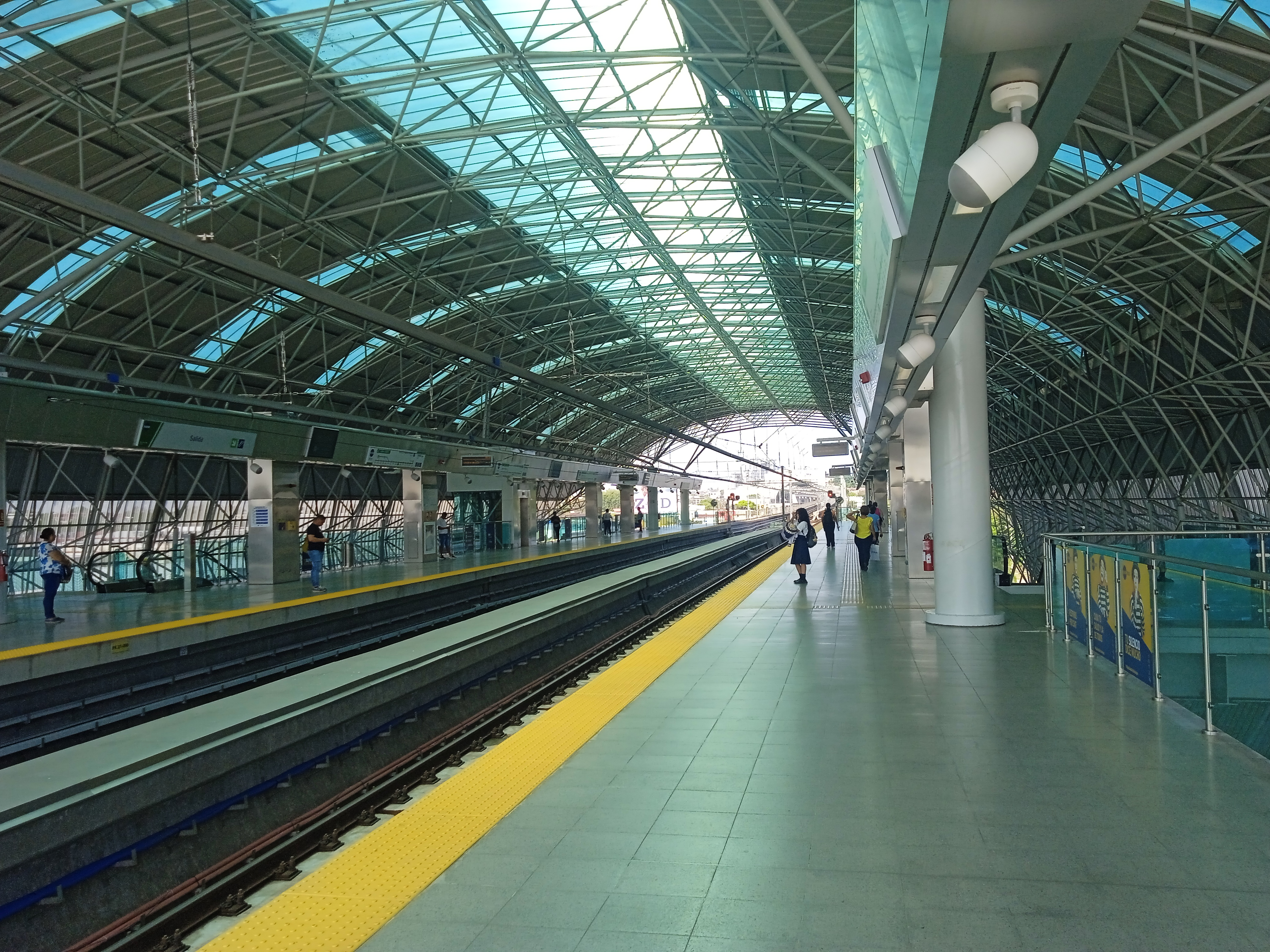

General information
- Location: Avenida Domingo Díaz; Rufina Alfaro, San Miguelito; Panama City; Panama
- Coordinates: 9°03′01.9″N 79°27′05.7″W
- System: Panama Metro station
- Line: Line 2

History
- Opened: 25 April 2019; 7 years ago

Services
Preceding station	Panama Metro	Following station
Brisas del Golf toward San Miguelito	Line 2	San Antonio toward Nuevo Tocumen
Location

Cerro Viento is a Panama Metro station on Line 2. It was opened on 25 April 2019 as part of the inaugural section of Line 2 between San Miguelito and Nuevo Tocumen. This is an elevated station built above Avenida Domingo Díaz. The station is located between Brisas del Golf and San Antonio. This station provides access to Centro Comercial Los Pueblos with an exit, and to Metromall with a footbridge.
