= Brisas del Golf metro station =

Panama metro station

Estación Brisas del Golf

General information
- Location: Avenida Domingo Díaz; Rufina Alfaro, San Miguelito; Panama City; Panama
- Coordinates: 9°02′57″N 79°27′32.4″W
- System: Panama Metro station
- Line: Line 2

History
- Opened: 25 April 2019; 7 years ago

Services
Preceding station	Panama Metro	Following station
El Crisol toward San Miguelito	Line 2	Cerro Viento toward Nuevo Tocumen
Location

Brisas del Golf is a Panama Metro station on Line 2. It was opened on 25 April 2019 as part of the inaugural section of Line 2 between San Miguelito and Nuevo Tocumen. This is an elevated station built above Avenida Domingo Díaz next to Avenida Paulo Zarate. The station is located between El Crisol and Cerro Viento.
