= San Antonio metro station (Panama) =

Panama metro station

Estación San Antonio

General information
- Location: Avenida Domingo Díaz; Rufina Alfaro, San Miguelito; Panama City; Panama
- Coordinates: 9°03′06.7″N 79°26′42.8″W
- System: Panama Metro station
- Line: Line 2

History
- Opened: 25 April 2019; 7 years ago

Services
Preceding station	Panama Metro	Following station
Cerro Viento toward San Miguelito	Line 2	Pedregal toward Nuevo Tocumen
Location

San Antonio is a Panama Metro station on Line 2. It was opened on 25 April 2019 as part of the inaugural section of Line 2 between San Miguelito and Nuevo Tocumen. This is an elevated station that is built above Avenida Domingo Díaz. The station is located between Cerro Viento and Pedregal.
