= Villa Lucre metro station =

Panama metro station

Estación Villa Lucre

General information
- Location: Avenida Domingo Díaz; José Domingo Espinar, San Miguelito; Panama City; Panama
- Coordinates: 9°02′13″N 79°28′54″W
- System: Panama Metro station
- Line: Line 2

History
- Opened: 25 April 2019; 7 years ago

Services
Preceding station	Panama Metro	Following station
Cincuentenario toward San Miguelito	Line 2	El Crisol toward Nuevo Tocumen
Location

Villa Lucre is a Panama Metro station on Line 2. It was opened on 25 April 2019 as part of the inaugural section of Line 2 between San Miguelito and Nuevo Tocumen. This is an elevated station built above Avenida Domingo Díaz next to Boulevard Villa Lucre. The station is located between Cincuentenario and El Crisol.
