= Corredor Sur metro station =

Panama metro station

Estación Corredor Sur
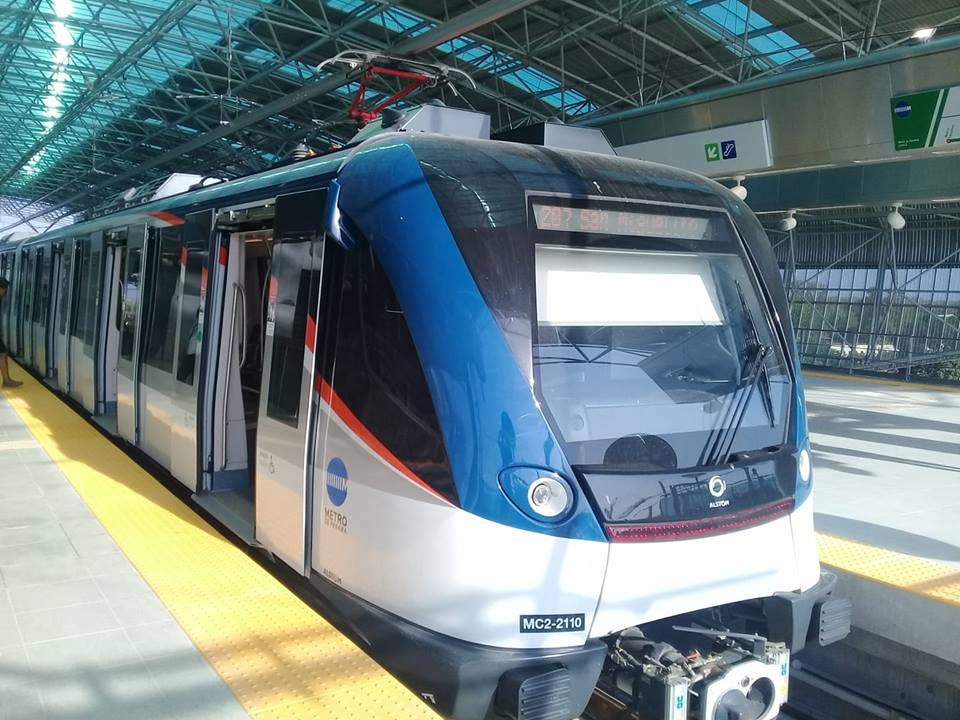
- Corredor Sur station platform in January 2019

General information
- Location: Avenida Domingo Díaz; Las Mañanitas, Panamá District; Panama City; Panama
- Coordinates: 09°04′08″N 79°24′25″W
- Platforms: 2 island platforms
- Tracks: 3
- Connections: MiBus: M481, V442, E436, E444, E445, E484, E485, E486, E489, E515, E516

Construction
- Structure type: Elevated

History
- Opened: 25 April 2019; 7 years ago

Services
Preceding station	Panama Metro	Following station
Don Bosco toward San Miguelito	Line 2	Las Mañanitas toward Nuevo Tocumen
Terminus	Line 2 Branch	ITSE toward Aeropuerto
Location

Corredor Sur is a station on Line 2 of the Panama Metro. It opened on 25 April 2019 as part of the inaugural section of the line between San Miguelito and Nuevo Tocumen. The elevated station is built above Avenida Domingo Díaz, near its junction with the Pan-American Highway, locally known as Corredor Sur. It lies between Don Bosco and Las Mañanitas.

On 16 March 2023, a branch of Line 2 known as El Ramal (lit. 'the branch') opened between Corredor Sur and Tocumen International Airport at Aeropuerto. Trains on this branch originate at Corredor Sur, with no through services from the main line. The first stop on the branch is ITSE.

At Corredor Sur, trains to the airport use the center track, while services toward San Miguelito and Nuevo Tocumen use the outer tracks. This arrangement enables cross-platform transfers between both directions of the main line and the airport branch.
