= Hospital del Este metro station =

Panama metro station

Estación Hospital del Este

General information
- Location: Corredor Sur; Las Mañanitas, Panama District; Panama City; Panama
- Coordinates: 9°05′37.4″N 79°23′39.4″W
- System: Panama Metro station
- Line: Line 2

History
- Opened: 25 April 2019; 7 years ago

Services
Preceding station	Panama Metro	Following station
Las Mañanitas toward San Miguelito	Line 2	Altos de Tocumen toward Nuevo Tocumen
Location

Hospital del Este is a Panama Metro station on Line 2. It was opened on 25 April 2019 as part of the inaugural section of Line 2 between San Miguelito and Nuevo Tocumen. This is an elevated station built above the Pan-American Highway, locally known as Corredor Sur. The station is located between Las Mañanitas and Altos de Tocumen.
