= El Crisol metro station =

Panama metro station

El Crisol
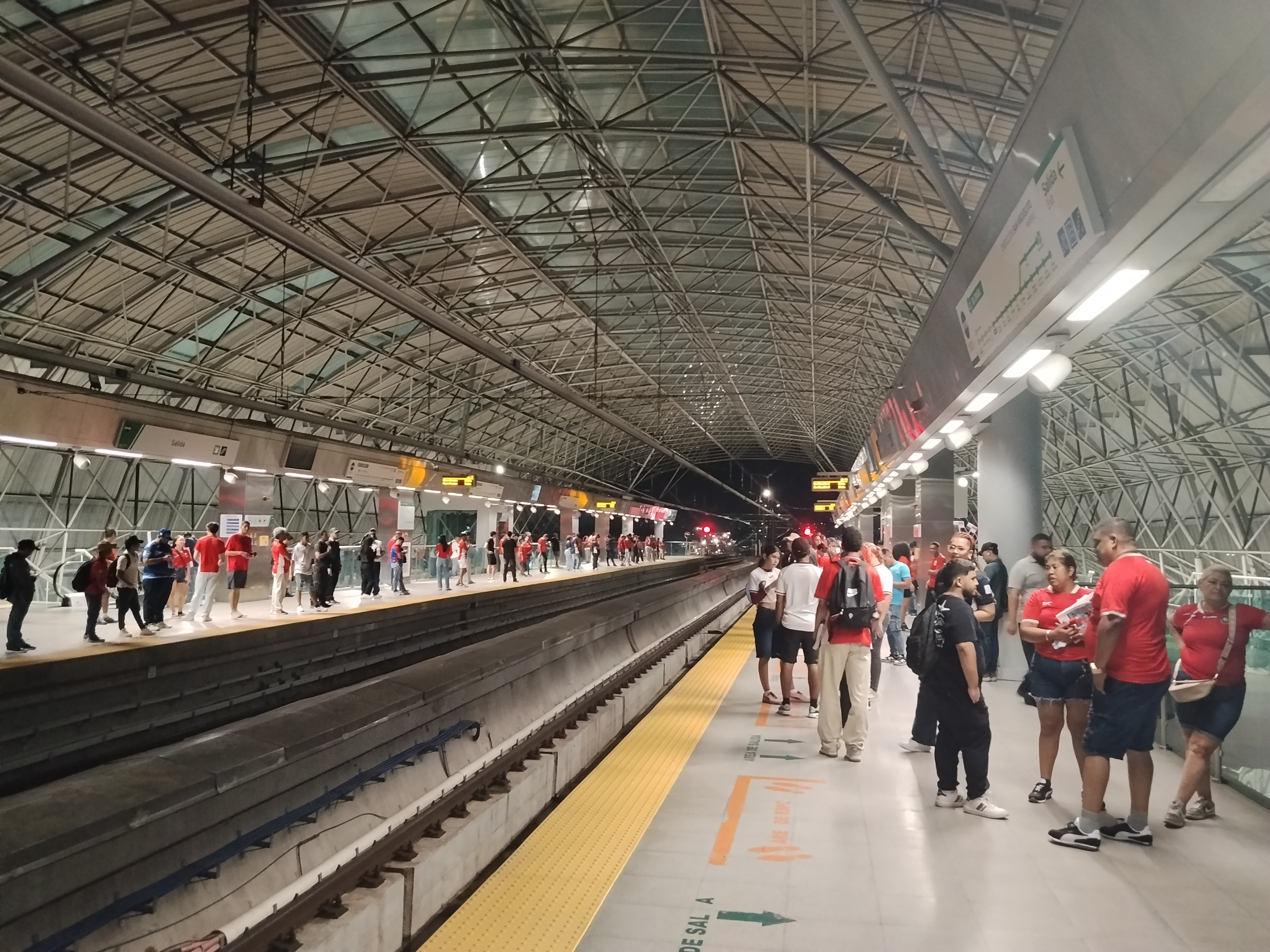

General information
- Location: Avenida Domingo Díaz; José Domingo Espinar, San Miguelito; Panama City; Panama
- Coordinates: 9°02′37″N 79°28′19.5″W
- System: Panama Metro station
- Line: Line 2

History
- Opened: 25 April 2019; 7 years ago

Services
Preceding station	Panama Metro	Following station
Villa Lucre toward San Miguelito	Line 2	Brisas del Golf toward Nuevo Tocumen
Location

El Crisol is a Panama Metro station on Line 2. It was opened on 25 April 2019 as part of the inaugural section of Line 2 between San Miguelito and Nuevo Tocumen. This is an elevated station built above Avenida Domingo Díaz in the city quarter of El Crisol. The station is located between Villa Lucre and Brisas del Golf.
