= Pedregal metro station =

Panama metro station

Estación Pedregal

General information
- Location: Avenida Domingo Díaz; Pedregal, Panama District; Panama City; Panama
- Coordinates: 9°03′35.5″N 79°25′45.9″W
- System: Panama Metro station
- Line: Line 2

History
- Opened: 25 April 2019; 7 years ago

Services
Preceding station	Panama Metro	Following station
San Antonio toward San Miguelito	Line 2	Don Bosco toward Nuevo Tocumen
Location

Pedregal is a Panama Metro station on Line 2. It was opened on 25 April 2019 as part of the inaugural section of Line 2 between San Miguelito and Nuevo Tocumen. This is an elevated station built above Avenida Domingo Díaz. The station is located between San Antonio and Don Bosco.
