= Paraíso metro station =

Panama metro station

Estación Paraíso

General information
- Location: Mateo Iturralde, San Miguelito; Panama City; Panama
- Coordinates: 9°01′48″N 79°29′57″W
- System: Panama Metro station
- Line: Line 2

History
- Opened: 25 April 2019; 7 years ago

Services
Preceding station	Panama Metro	Following station
San Miguelito Terminus	Line 2	Cincuentenario toward Nuevo Tocumen
Location

Paraíso is a Panama Metro station on Line 2. It was opened on 25 April 2019 as part of the inaugural section of Line 2 between San Miguelito and Nuevo Tocumen. This is an elevated station built above Avenida Domingo Díaz, with an exit to Calle Altamira. The station is located between San Miguelito and Cincuentenario.
