= El Ingenio metro station =

Panama metro station

Estación El Ingenio
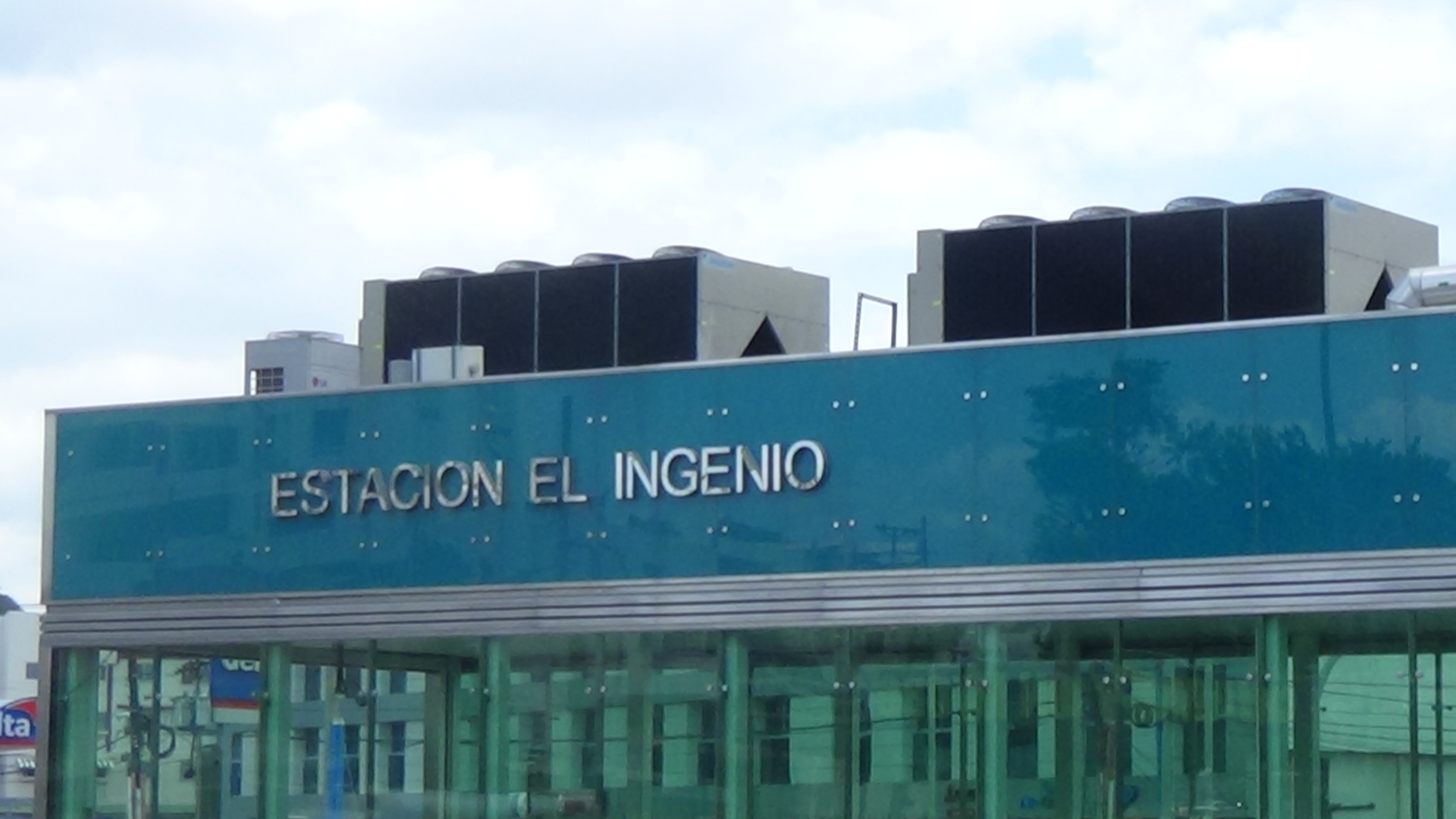
- Station exterior

General information
- Location: Vía Simón Bolívar and Avenida de la Paz; Panamá District; Panama City; Panama
- Coordinates: 9°00′28″N 79°31′08″W
- System: Panama Metro station
- Platforms: 2

History
- Opened: 8 May 2015; 11 years ago

Services
Preceding station	Panama Metro	Following station
Fernández de Córdoba toward Albrook	Line 1	12 de Octubre toward Villa Zaita
Location

El Ingenio is a Panama Metro station on Line 1. It was originally scheduled to open in August 2014, but opened on 8 May 2015. The station cost US$30 million and was officially opened by ministers Roberto Roy and Álvaro Alemán. It was the thirteenth station opened on the network and is the final underground station before the elevated 12 de Octubre station.

It serves the neighbourhood of El Ingenio, the major thoroughfare of Avenida Transístmica and also provides access to many colleges located nearby.
