= Cincuentenario metro station =

Panama metro station

Estación Cincuentenario
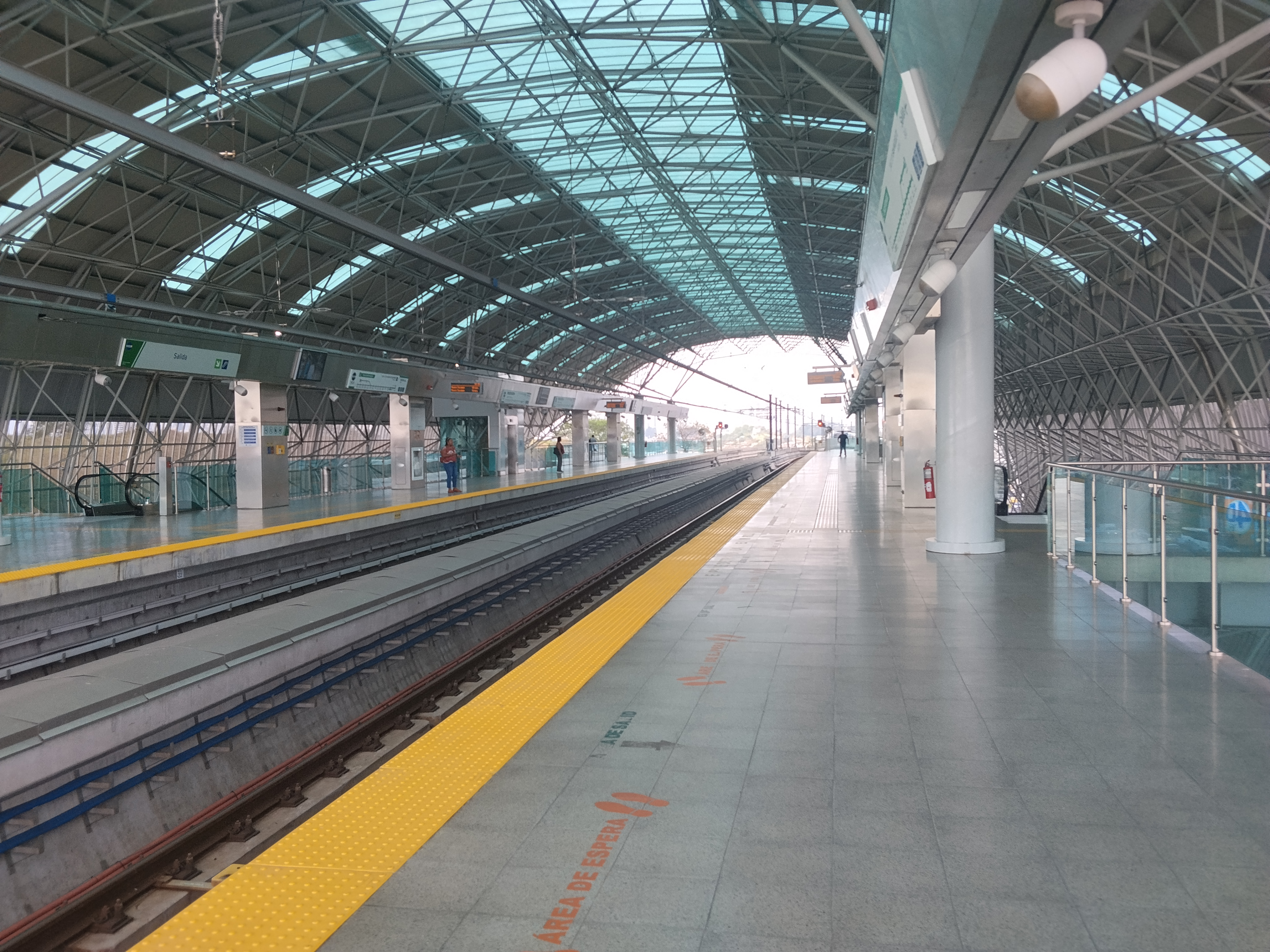

General information
- Location: Avenida Domingo Díaz; Mateo Iturralde, San Miguelito; Panama City; Panama
- Coordinates: 9°01′49″N 79°29′30″W
- System: Panama Metro station
- Line: Line 2

History
- Opened: 25 April 2019; 7 years ago

Services
| Preceding station | Panama Metro | Following station |
|---|---|---|
| Paraíso toward San Miguelito | Line 2 | Villa Lucre toward Nuevo Tocumen |
Location

Cincuentenario is a Panama Metro station on Line 2. It was opened on 25 April 2019 as part of the inaugural section of Line 2 between San Miguelito and Nuevo Tocumen. This is an elevated station built next to Avenida Domingo Díaz and Rotonda Roosevelt. The station is located between Paraíso and Villa Lucre.
