= Cincuentenario =

Cincuentenario is Spanish for the Fiftieth Anniversary. It can denote the following objects:

- Cincuentenario, a rapid transit station in Panama City
- Estadio Cincuentenario, an indoor arena in Formosa, Argentina
