= ITSE metro station =

Panama metro station

Estación ITSE

General information
- Location: Avenida Domingo Díaz; Tocumen, Panamá District; Panama City; Panama
- Coordinates: 09°04′09″N 79°23′54″W
- Platforms: 1
- Tracks: 2
- Connections: MiBus: S480, S481, S482, E484, E485, E487, E489

Construction
- Structure type: Elevated

History
- Opened: 16 March 2023

Services
Preceding station	Panama Metro	Following station
Corredor Sur Terminus	Line 2 Branch	Aeropuerto Terminus
Location

ITSE station is a Panama Metro station located next to the campus of Instituto Técnico Superior Especializado (ITSE), from where its name originates. This is an elevated station built above Avenida Domingo Díaz.

The station is located along El Ramal Line 2 (English: Line 2 Branch). It was opened on 16 March 2023 as part of a two station extension of Line 2 between Corredor Sur and Aeropuerto. The El Ramal trains terminate at Corredor Sur, there is no through traffic to Line 2.
