= Las Mañanitas (disambiguation) =

"Las Mañanitas" is a traditional Mexican birthday song.

'Las Mañanitas may also refer to:

- Las Mañanitas (celebration), an annual event held in Ponce, Puerto Rico
- Las Mañanitas, Panama, a town in Panama Province
  - Las Mañanitas metro station, a rapid transit station serving the area
- Las Mañanitas (Mexibús), a BRT station in Nezahualcóyotl, Mexico
