= Pueblo Nuevo metro station =

Panama metro station

Estación Pueblo Nuevo
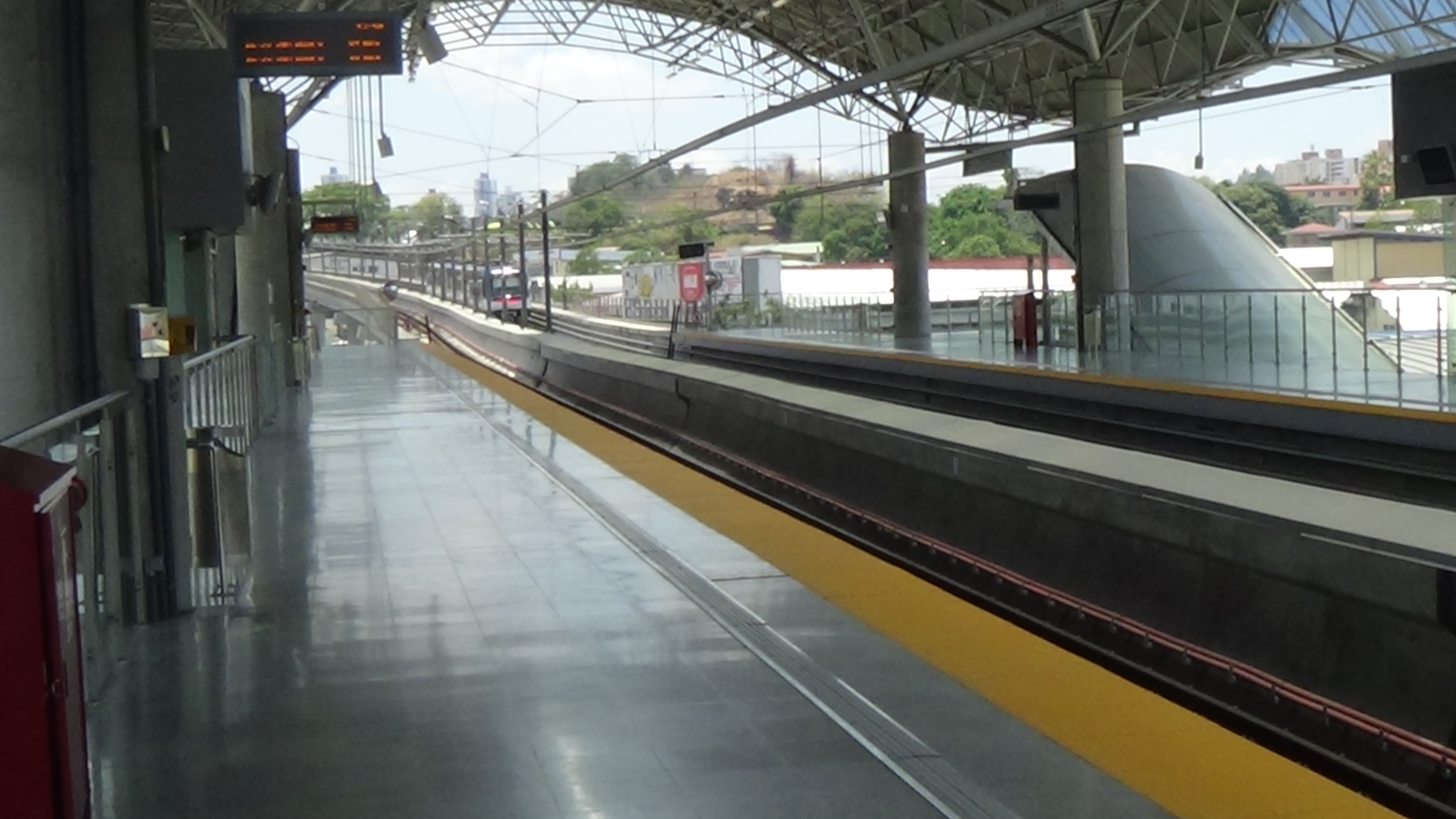
- Station platforms

General information
- Location: Vía Simón Bolívar; Pueblo Nuevo, Panamá District; Panama City; Panama
- Coordinates: 9°01′24″N 79°30′46″W
- System: Panama Metro station
- Platforms: 2

History
- Opened: 5 April 2014; 12 years ago

Services
Preceding station	Panama Metro	Following station
12 de Octubre toward Albrook	Line 1	San Miguelito toward Villa Zaita
Location

Pueblo Nuevo is a Panama Metro station on Line 1. It was one of the first 11 stations when the metro began operations on 6 April 2014. It is the second of six elevated stations when travelling towards the San Isidro terminus.

The station is located in the district of the same name, in one of the city's more important industrial zones. It is the least-used station on the network, carrying only 1% of the network's passengers at peak times. In June 2016, the station was used by 1,679 people per day on average, in contrast to the preceding and following stations, 12 de Octubre and San Miguelito, which were used by over 34,000 people daily. Architect Álvaro Uribe justified the station's creation on the basis that it would encourage future development in the area.
