= Vía Argentina metro station =

Panama metro station

Estación Vía Argentina
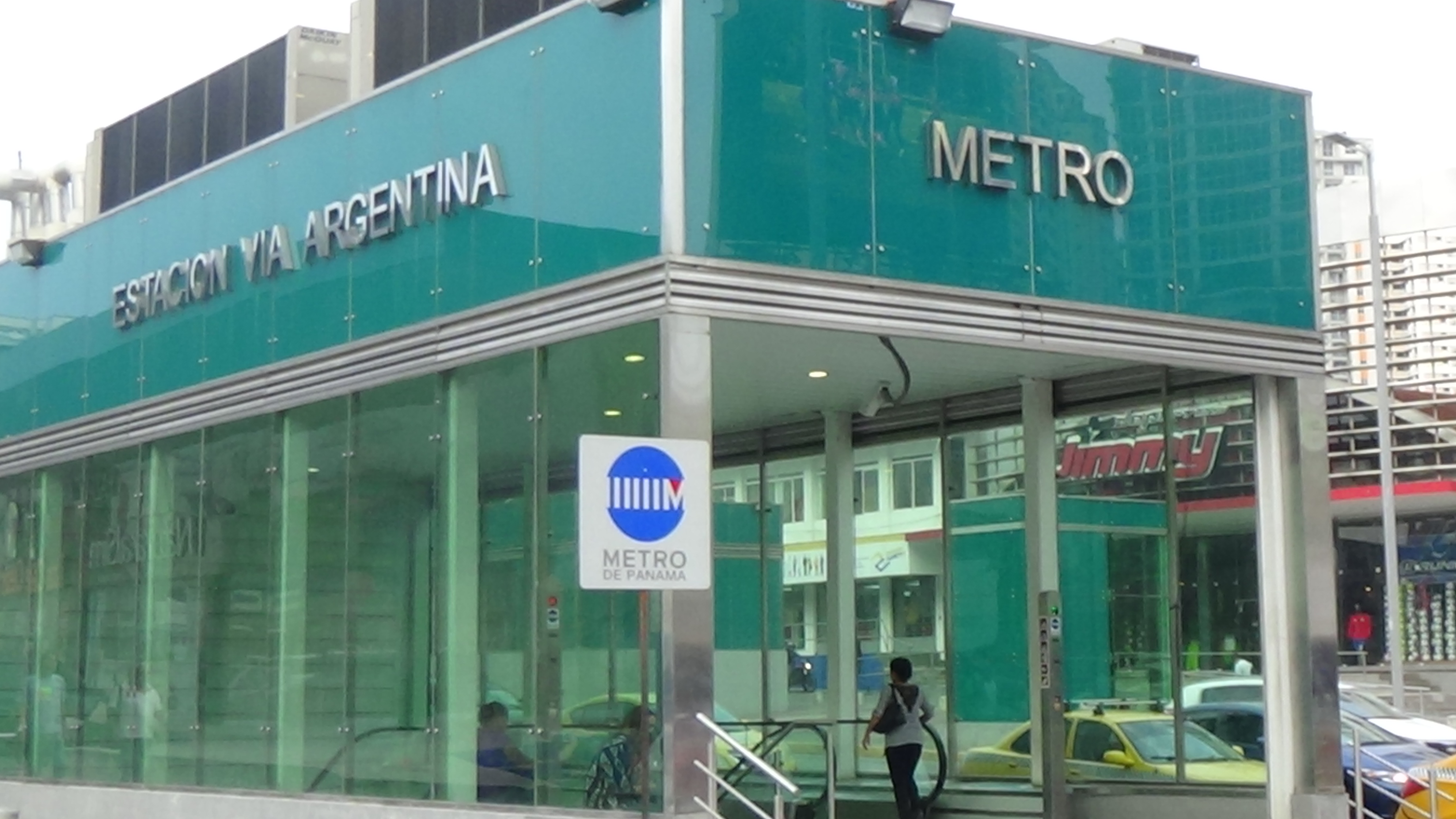
- Vía Argentina metro station

General information
- Location: Vía España and Vía Argentina; Bella Vista, Panamá District; Panama City; Panama
- Coordinates: 8°59′24″N 79°31′19″W
- System: Panama Metro station
- Line: Line 1
- Platforms: 2

History
- Opened: 5 April 2014; 12 years ago

Services
Preceding station	Panama Metro	Following station
Iglesia del Carmen toward Albrook	Line 1	Fernández de Córdoba toward Villa Zaita
Location

Vía Argentina is a Panama Metro station on Line 1. It was one of the metro network's first 11 stations, opened on 5 April 2014 and commencing operations the following day.

The station serves the neighbourhoods of Obarrio and El Cangrejo, providing access to the city's financial and banking district.

In its first year of operations, it was the sixth most used station of the twelve on the network at that time, carrying 18% of the system's users at peak times.
