= Fernández de Córdoba metro station =

Panama metro station

Estación Fernández de Córdoba
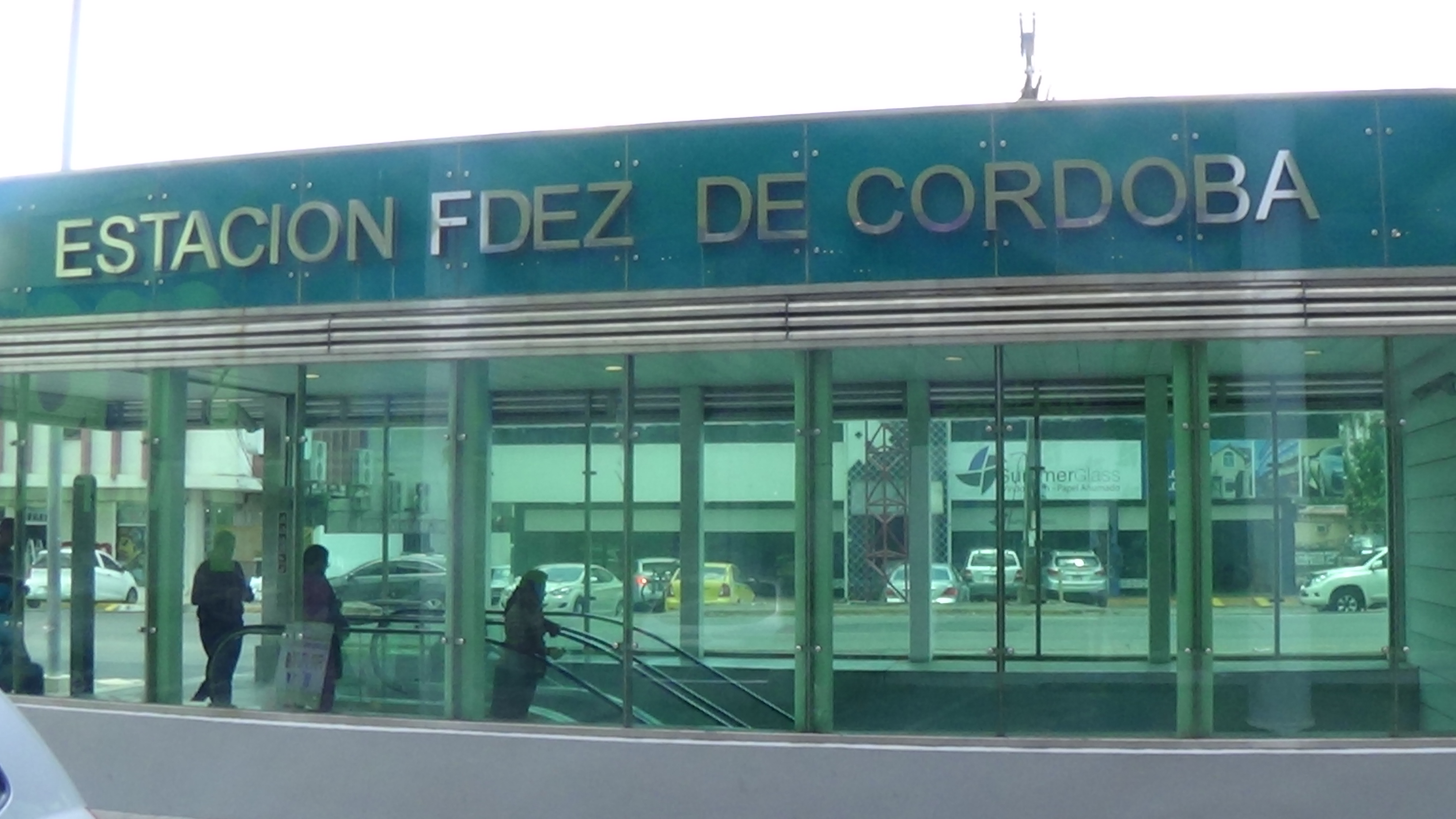
- Fernández de Córdoba station

General information
- Location: Vía Fernández de Córdona; Panamá District; Panama City; Panama
- Coordinates: 8°59′47″N 79°31′11″W
- System: Panama Metro station
- Platforms: 2

History
- Opened: 5 April 2014; 12 years ago

Services
Preceding station	Panama Metro	Following station
Vía Argentina toward Albrook	Line 1	El Ingenio toward Villa Zaita
Location

Fernández de Córdoba is a Panama Metro station on Line 1. The tunnels to the station were completed in August 2012 and it was one of the first 11 stations when the metro began operations on 6 April 2014.

The station serves the Vista Hermosa neighbourhood. In April 2016, the network's metro library was opened in the station. In its first year of operations, it was the seventh most used station of the twelve on the network at that time, carrying 12% of the system's users at peak times.
