= Iglesia del Carmen metro station =

Panama metro station

Estación Iglesia del Carmen
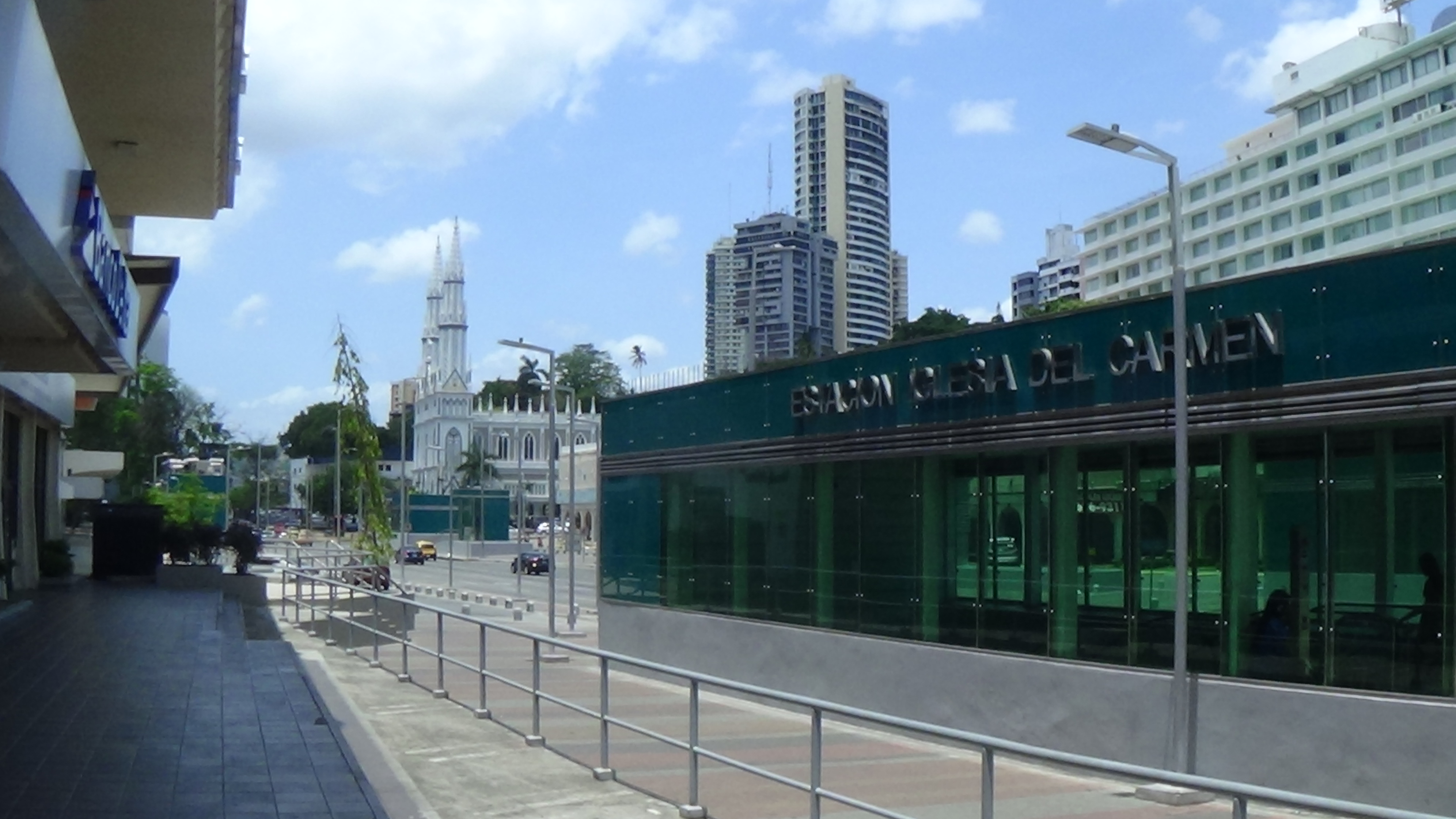
- Iglesia del Carmen metro station

General information
- Location: Vía España; Bella Vista, Panamá District; Panama City; Panama
- Coordinates: 8°58′56″N 79°31′38″W
- System: Panama Metro station
- Line: Line 1
- Platforms: 2

History
- Opened: 5 April 2014; 12 years ago

Services
| Preceding station | Panama Metro | Following station |
|---|---|---|
| Santo Tomás toward Albrook | Line 1 | Vía Argentina toward Villa Zaita |
Location

Iglesia del Carmen is a Panama Metro station on Line 1. It was one of the metro network's first 11 stations, opened on 5 April 2014 and commencing operations the following day.

The station is named after the nearby neo-gothic church. It serves the neighbourhood of Bella Vista, providing access to the city's financial and banking district and the nightlife and restaurant zone of Calle 50.

In its first year of operations, it was the fifth most used station of the twelve on the network at that time, carrying 18% of the system's users at peak times.

Iglesia del Carmen is seen as a key interchange station in the plans to expand the metro, as it will connect line 1 with the future line 2 and line 5.
