= Roberto Roy =

Roberto Roy is a Panamanian civil and mechanical engineer and politician, who served as the Minister of Canal Affairs of Panama from 2012 and as Director General of Panama Metro from January 2015.

Roy graduated in mechanical engineering at the Georgia Institute of Technology, gaining a master's degree in industrial administration at the same Institute. He also graduated in civil engineering at Universidad Católica Santa María La Antigua Roy launched his own construction company, R-M Ingeneria, in 1975.

In September 2012, Roy was named a knight of the French Legion of Honour in a ceremony presided over by French Ambassador Hugues Goisbault. In May 2016, Roy was granted the Order of Civil Merit by the government of Spain.

In his role as Minister, Roy oversaw the expansion of the Panama Canal in June 2016.
