= Santo Tomás metro station =

Panama metro station

Estación Santo Tomás
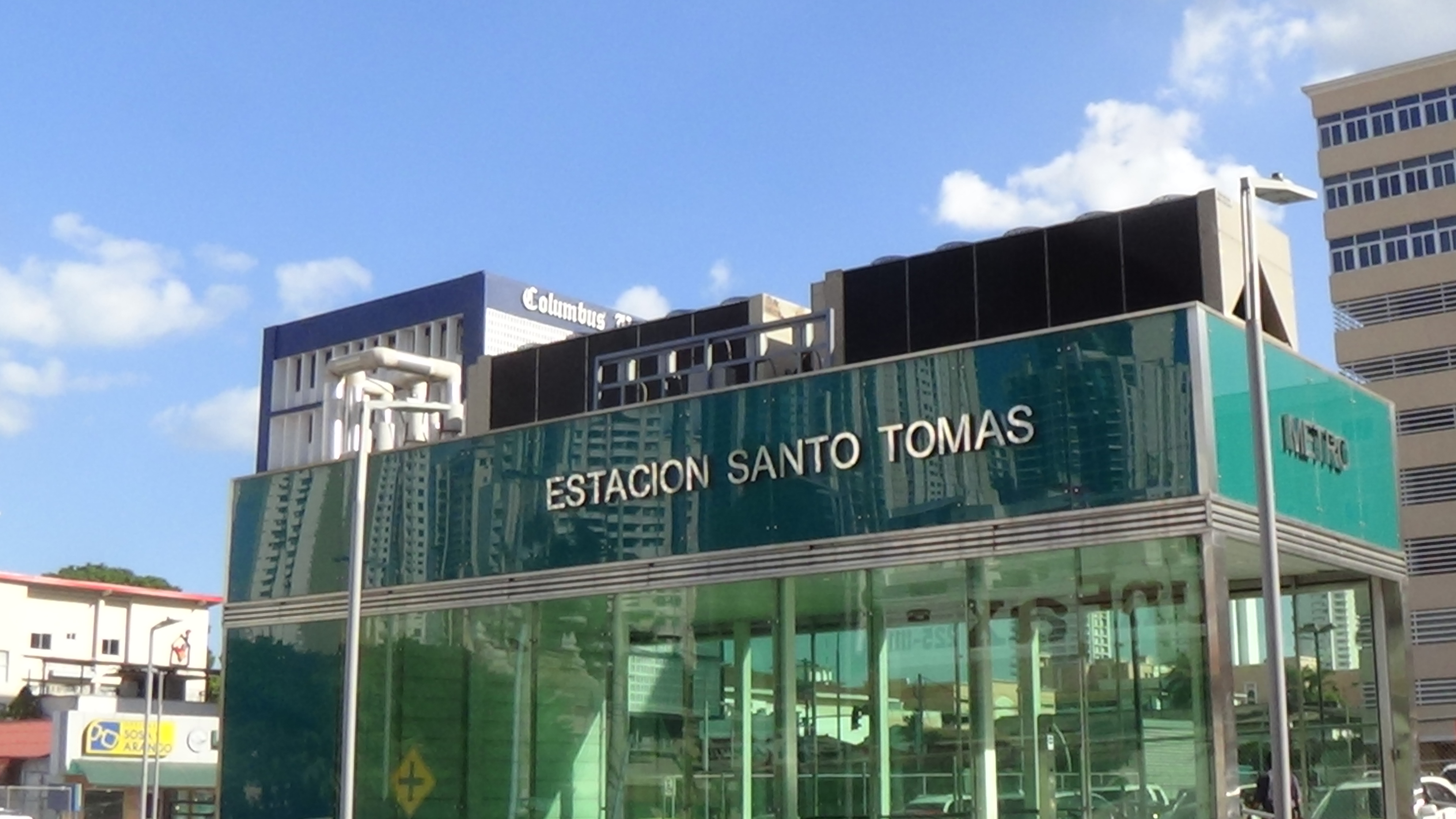
- Santo Tomas station

General information
- Location: Avenida Justo Arosemena; Calidonia, Panamá District; Panama City; Panama
- Coordinates: 8°58′23.9″N 79°31′57.7″W
- System: Panama Metro station
- Platforms: 2

History
- Opened: 5 April 2014; 12 years ago

Services
Preceding station	Panama Metro	Following station
Lotería toward Albrook	Line 1	Iglesia del Carmen toward Villa Zaita
Location

Santo Tomás is a Panama Metro station on Line 1. Construction of the station began on 16 August 2011 and it was one of the first 11 stations when the metro began operations on 6 April 2014.

The station provides access to Hospital Santo Tomas and the Cinta Costera. It has hosted displays of sculptures and photography. In its first year of operations, Santo Tomas was the tenth most used station of the twelve on the network at that time, carrying 8% of the system's users at peak times.
