= 12 de Octubre metro station =

Panama metro station

Estación 12 de Octubre
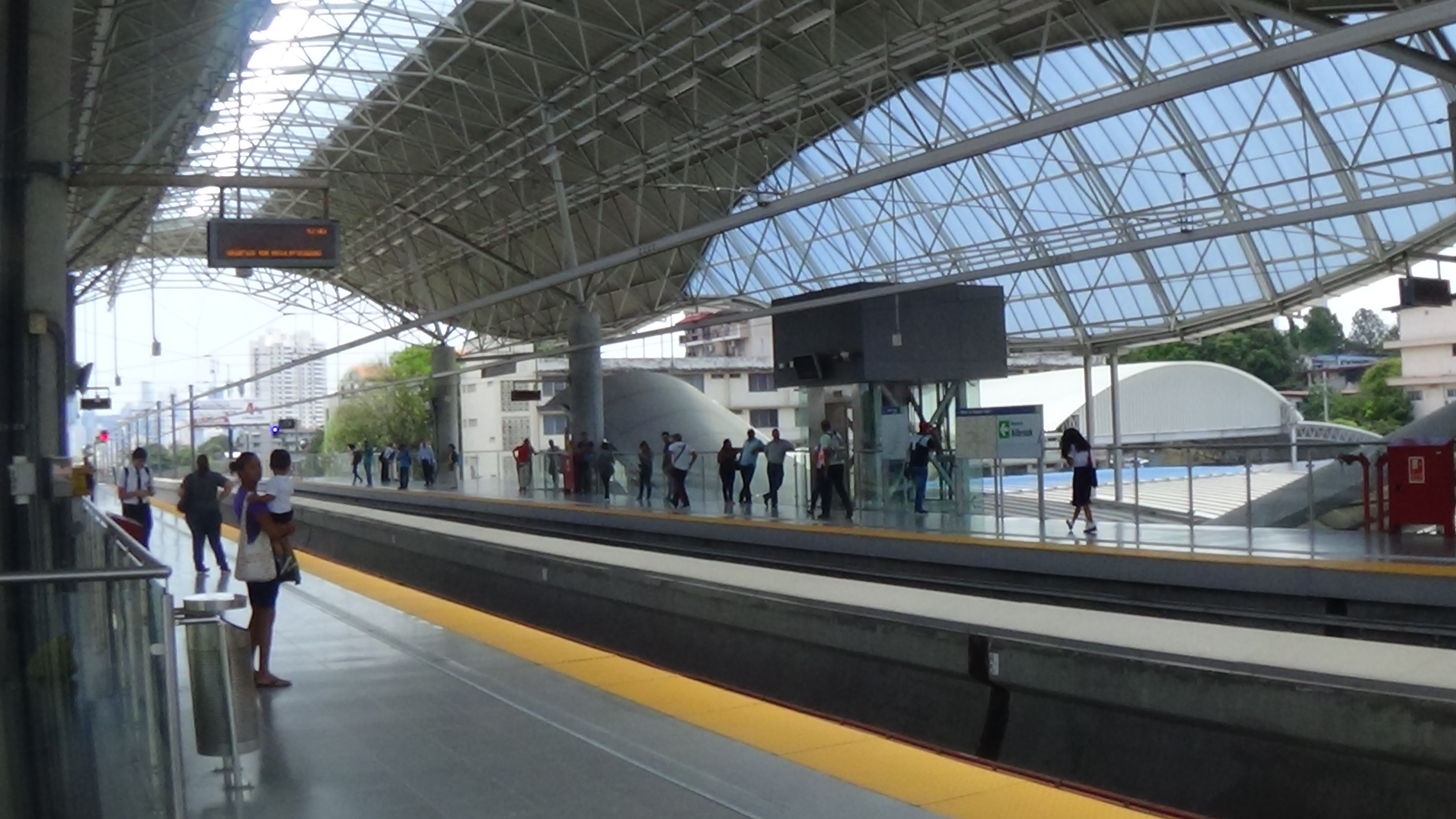
- Platforms

General information
- Location: Vía Simón Bolívar and Avenida 12 de Octubre; Panamá District; Panama City; Panama
- Coordinates: 9°01′00″N 79°31′03″W
- System: Panama Metro station
- Platforms: 2

History
- Opened: 5 April 2014; 12 years ago

Services
Preceding station	Panama Metro	Following station
El Ingenio toward Albrook	Line 1	Pueblo Nuevo toward Villa Zaita
Location

12 de Octubre is a Panama Metro station on Line 1. Construction of the station began on 17 March 2012 and it was one of the first 11 stations when the metro began operations on 6 April 2014. It is the first of six elevated stations when travelling towards the San Isidro terminus.

Located in the district of the same name, the station is the closest to Panamá Viejo, the original site of Panama city. In its first year of operations, 12 de Octubre was the eighth most used station of the twelve on the network at that time, carrying 8% of the system's users at peak times.
