= 24 de Diciembre metro station =

Panama metro station

Estación 24 de Diciembre
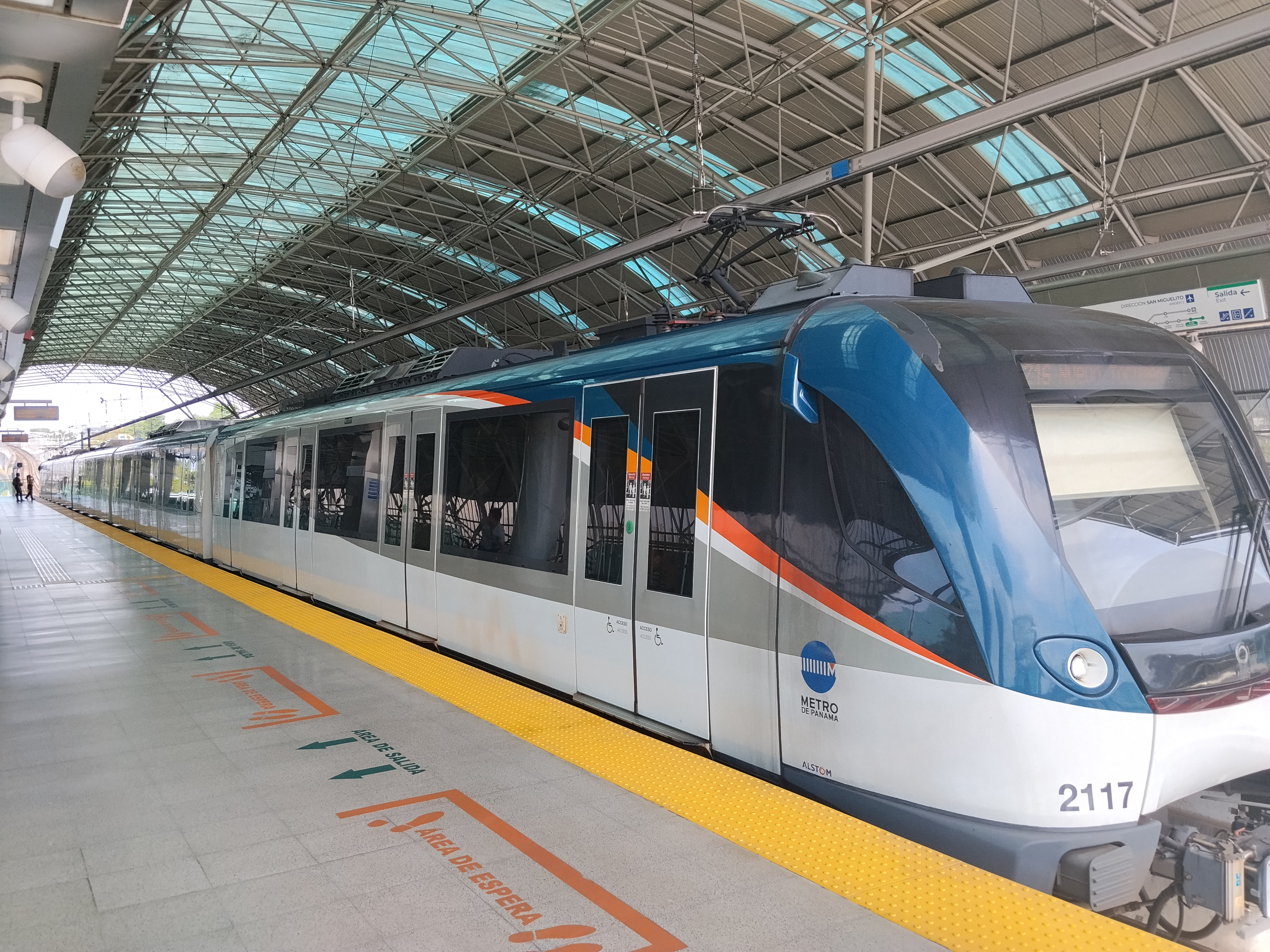

General information
- Location: Pan-American Highway; Tocumen, Panama District; Panama City; Panama
- Coordinates: 9°06′12.2″N 79°22′14.6″W
- System: Panama Metro station
- Line: Line 2

History
- Opened: 25 April 2019; 7 years ago

Services
Preceding station	Panama Metro	Following station
Altos de Tocumen toward San Miguelito	Line 2	Nuevo Tocumen Terminus
Location

24 de Diciembre is a Panama Metro station on Line 2. It was opened on 25 April 2019 as part of the inaugural section of Line 2 between San Miguelito and Nuevo Tocumen. This is an elevated station built above the Pan-American Highway. This station provides access to Centro Comercial La Doña. The station is located between Altos de Tocumen and Nuevo Tocumen.
