= Mateo Iturralde =

- Corregimiento
- Location within Panama
- Country: Panama
- Province: Panamá
- District: San Miguelito

Area
  - Land: 1 km^{2} (0.39 sq mi)

Population (2010)
  - Total: 11,496
  - Density: 11,565.4/km^{2} (29,954/sq mi)
- Population density calculated based on land area.
- Time zone: UTC−5 (EST)

Mateo Iturralde is a corregimiento in San Miguelito District, Panamá Province, Panama with a population of 11,496 as of 2010. Its population as of 1990 was 13,662; its population as of 2000 was 12,607.
