= MiBus =

Panama City Metrobus

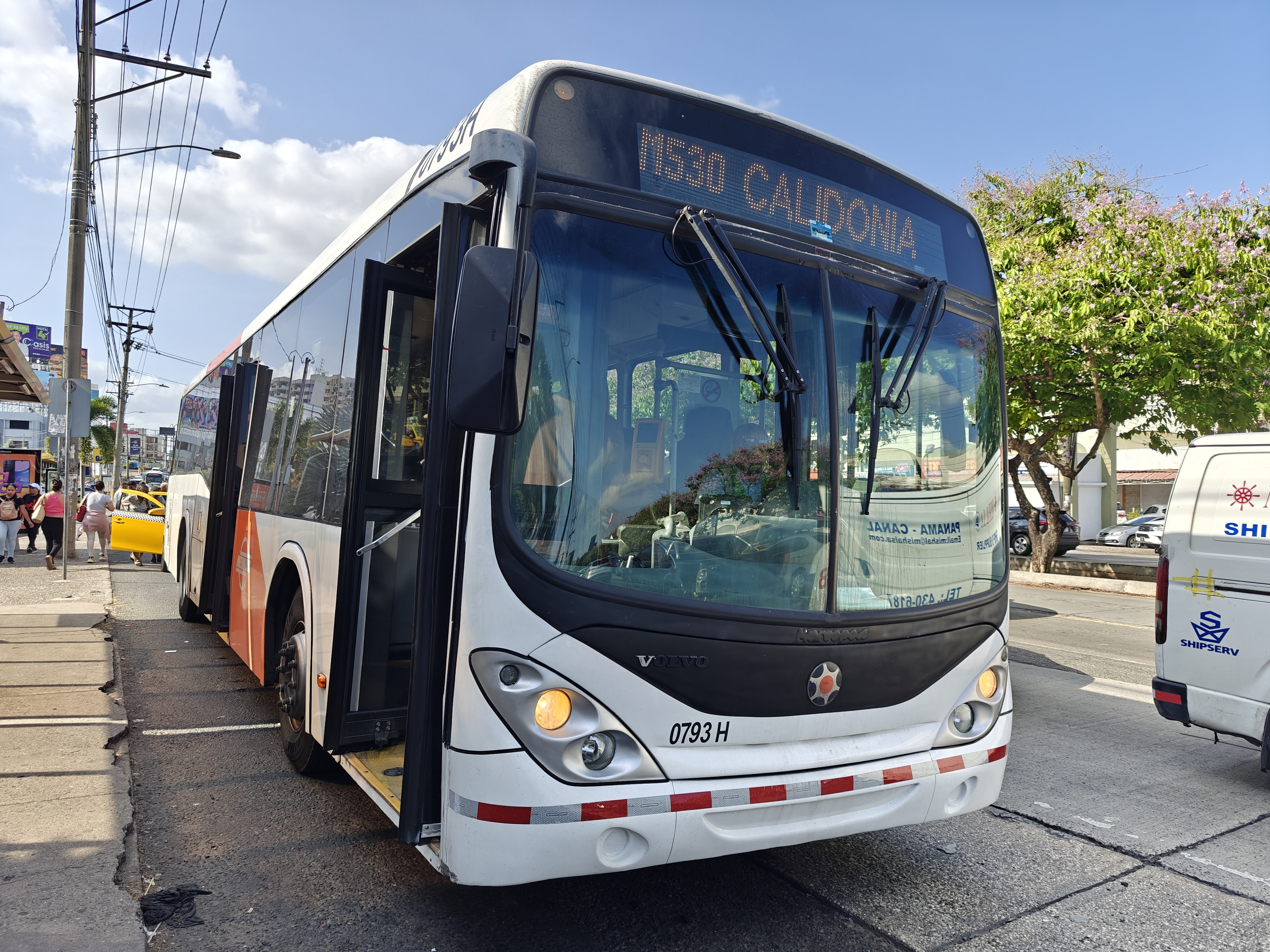
- Bus arriving at El Dorado Mall
- Founded: December 28, 2010
- Locale: Panama City, Panama
- Routes: 142
- Fleet: 1,436 buses
- Daily ridership: 325,000 (2021)
- Website: mibus.com.pa

The Metrobus is the mass bus transportation system that operates in the districts of Panama, San Miguelito and Colón. The system began operations on December 28, 2010, replacing the Diablos Rojos bus system (used school buses from the United States) that existed for several decades. It travels the main roads of Panama City (Vía España, Vía Simón Bolívar or Transístmica, Vía Ricardo J. Alfaro or Tumba Muerto, Avenida Balboa / Vía Israel and Avenida Domingo Díaz), the main toll highways (Corredor Norte and Corredor Sur ), as well as other minor transversal routes. In Colón the route is from Altos de Los Lagos-city center. The MiBus transport service is expected to be implemented in the Arraiján District and the western sector of the country.

The system is in charge of the MiBus company, initially managed by the Colombian-Panamanian consortium Transporte Masivo de Panamá until 2015, when the Panamanian government bought and assumed the operations of the company (remaining under the umbrella of the Panama Metro) and hired the American company First Transit, a subsidiary of FirstGroup, in the administrative part.

== Route network ==
The routes are organized into several networks. In each case, the individual route numbers start with a letter which denotes the network to which it belongs.

=== Rutas Corredores ===
The Rutas Corredores (transl. Corridor Routes) travel along the highways around Panama, the North Corridor and the South Corridor, which carries the Pan-American Highway around the city.

Network name		Roadways travelled
S	Corredor Sur	Corredor Sur - Av. Panamericana - Av. Balboa - Cinta Costera
T	Corredor Norte	Corredor Norte Autopista

=== Rutas Troncales ===
The Rutas Troncales (transl. Trunk Routes) travel along the major streets in Panama.

Network name		Roadways travelled
K	Av. Transístmica	Av. Transístmica - Av. Simón Bolívar - Boyd Roosevelt
M	Tumba Muerto	Vía Tocumen - Domingo Díaz - Vía Ricardo J. Alfaro
V	Vía España	José Agustín Arango - Vía España - Calle 50 - Vía Brasil - Av. Fernández de Córdoba
I	Vía Israel	Av. Cincuentenario - Vía Israel

=== Rutas Complementarias ===
The Rutas Complementarias (transl. Complementary Routes) are shorter routes that travel through the neighborhoods in Panama City, connecting passengers to the main routes.

Network name		Roadways travelled
C	Tramos Centro	Av. Omar Torrijos- Av. Transístmica - Vía España - Vía Ricardo J. Alfaro - Av. Balboa
E	Tramos Este	Av. Domingo Díaz - Av.José Agustín Arango - Av.José María Torrijos- Ctra. Panamericana
N	Tramos Norte	Av. Transístmica

== Body (Gran Viale) ==
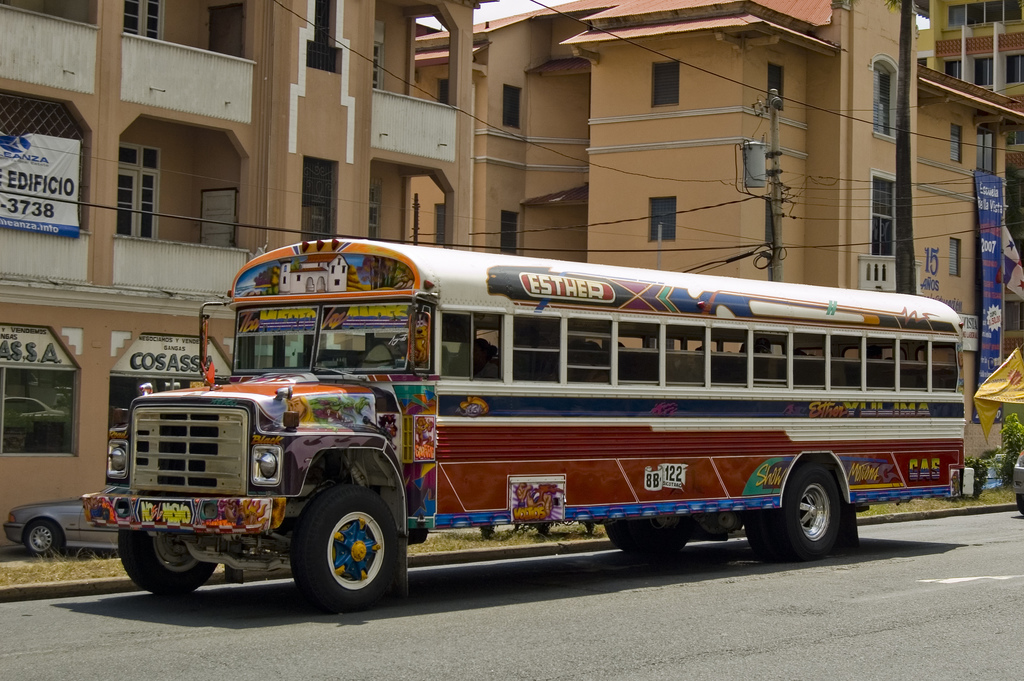
a Diablo Rojo giving route

The buses were manufactured in Colombia and Brazil by the Volvo company, where the bodywork is assembled by the Brazilian firm Marcopolo. Each unit has two doors, two fire extinguishers, eight stop buttons and six hammers in case of fire, has air conditioning and led signs of the route in the upper front part (made by the Mobitec company). Each vehicle contains 38 seats (with two preferential seats designated for pregnant women, seniors and people with limited capacity) and two spaces for the disabled (located in the central part).

below the specifications:

- Air Conditioning: EBERSPAECHER / THERMOKING
- Length: 12 meters
- Number of Chairs: 35
- User Capacity 80
- Fire Fighting System: Automatic
- Stop Bells: 8

== Card ==
The boarding of the buses must be done through a smart card, implemented as of February 15, 2012. The administration and platform of the card system is in charge of the Chilean company Sonda S.A..

There are three types of cards: a regular one, a special one for school students and a "3 in 1" called Rapi pass, which joins the departure of the Albrook Transportation Terminal, the Metro bus and Line 1 and 2 of the Panama Metro. Rates range from B /. 0.10 for students, B /. 0.25 for regular passengers (standard) and B /. 0.75 on corridor and highway routes. The cost of the card is two balboas, which can be recharged at different points in the city, especially at the Albrook Transport Terminal and Paid Zones.

== New Metrobuses (Torino) ==
The new buses are brought from Brazil by Marcopolo in 2017 and were initially used for the Corredor Norte and Corredor Sur routes.

Marcopolo improved the air conditioning system since the previous buses the air conditioning was not powerful enough to cope with the climate of the country. On the side it removes the logo (Metrobus) to place the name of the company that manages it (MiBus).

below the specifications:

- Air Conditioning: EBERSPAECHER
- Length: 13.2 meters
- Number of Chairs: 48+2 Seats
- Number of Buses: 10
- User Capacity: 80
- Fire Fighting System: Automatic
- Stop Bell: 11
