= José Domingo Espinar =

- Corregimiento
- Location within Panama
- Coordinates: 9°02′49″N 79°29′17″W
- Country: Panama
- Province: Panamá
- District: San Miguelito

Area
  - Land: 7.1 km^{2} (2.7 sq mi)

Population (2010)
  - Total: 44,471
  - Density: 6,265.2/km^{2} (16,227/sq mi)
- Population density calculated based on land area.
- Time zone: UTC−5 (EST)

José Domingo Espinar is a corregimiento in San Miguelito District, Panamá Province, Panama with a population of 44,471 as of 2010. Its population as of 1990 was 58,745; its population as of 2000 was 35,301.
