= Rufina Alfaro, Panama =

Rufina Alfaro
- Corregimiento
- Location within Panama
- Coordinates: 9.0699°N 79.4575°W
- Country: Panama
- Province: Panamá
- District: San Miguelito
- Established: June 27, 2000

Area
  - Land: 9.6 km^{2} (3.7 sq mi)

Population (2010)
  - Total: 42,742
  - Density: 4,468.6/km^{2} (11,574/sq mi)
- Population density calculated based on land area.
- Time zone: UTC−5 (EST)

see also The Gesture of Rufina Alfaro.

Rufina Alfaro is a corregimiento in San Miguelito District, Panamá Province, Panama with a population of 42,742 as of 2010. It was created by Law 21 of June 27, 2000. Its population as of 2000 was 25,239.
