= Villa Zaita metro station =

Panama metro station

Estación Villa Zaita
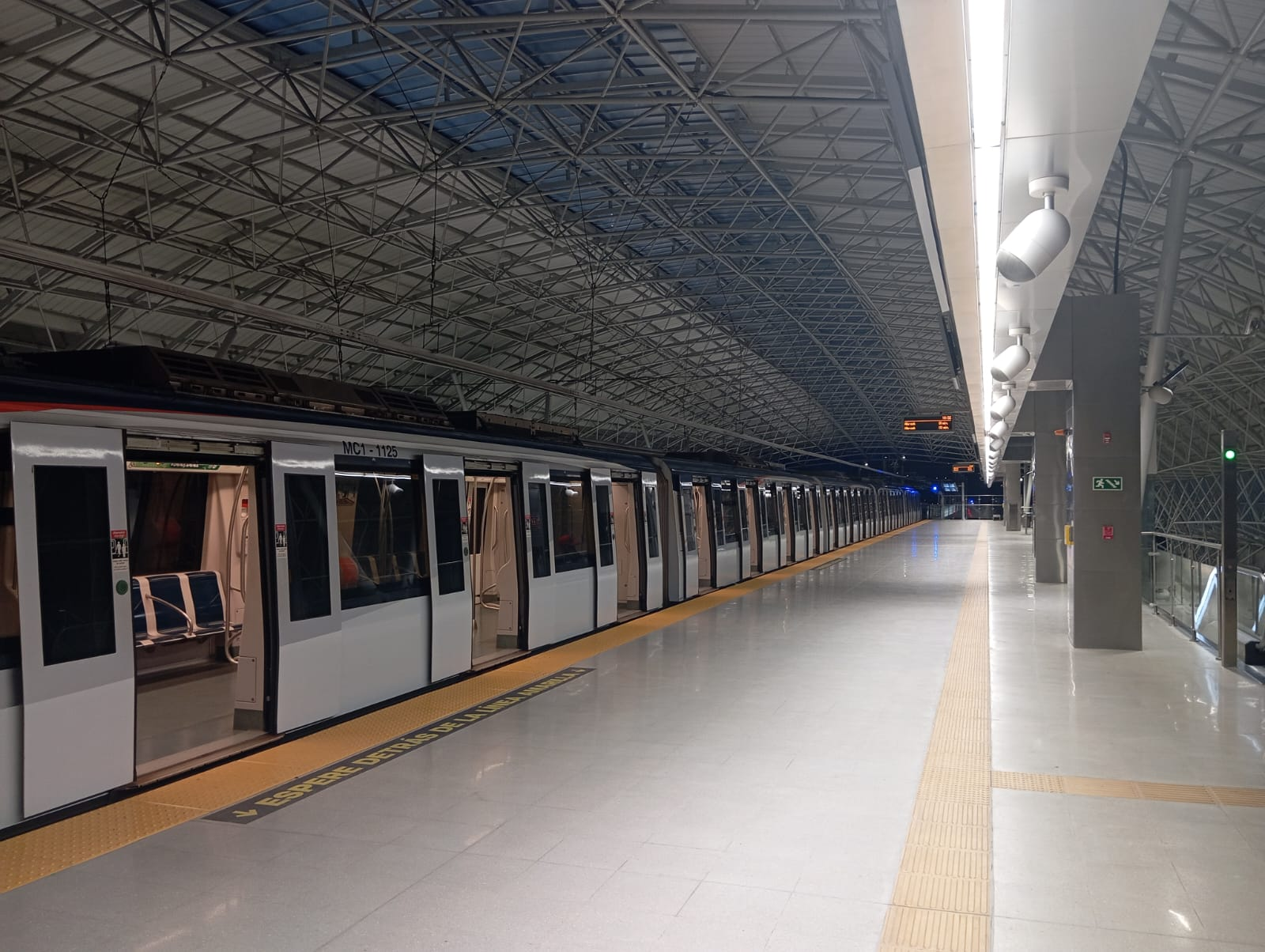

General information
- Location: Panama City; Panama
- Coordinates: 9°04′48″N 79°31′37″W
- System: Panama Metro station
- Line: Line 1

History
- Opened: 25 April 2024; 2 years ago

Services
Preceding station	Panama Metro	Following station
San Isidro toward Albrook	Line 1	Terminus
Location

Villa Zaita is a Panama Metro station on Line 1. It was opened on April 25, 2024 by Laurentino Cortizo Cohen, President of Panama, and Héctor Ortega, director general of the Panama Metro, as the northern terminus of an extension of Line 1 from San Isidro.
