= San Miguelito metro station =

Panama metro station

Estación San Miguelito
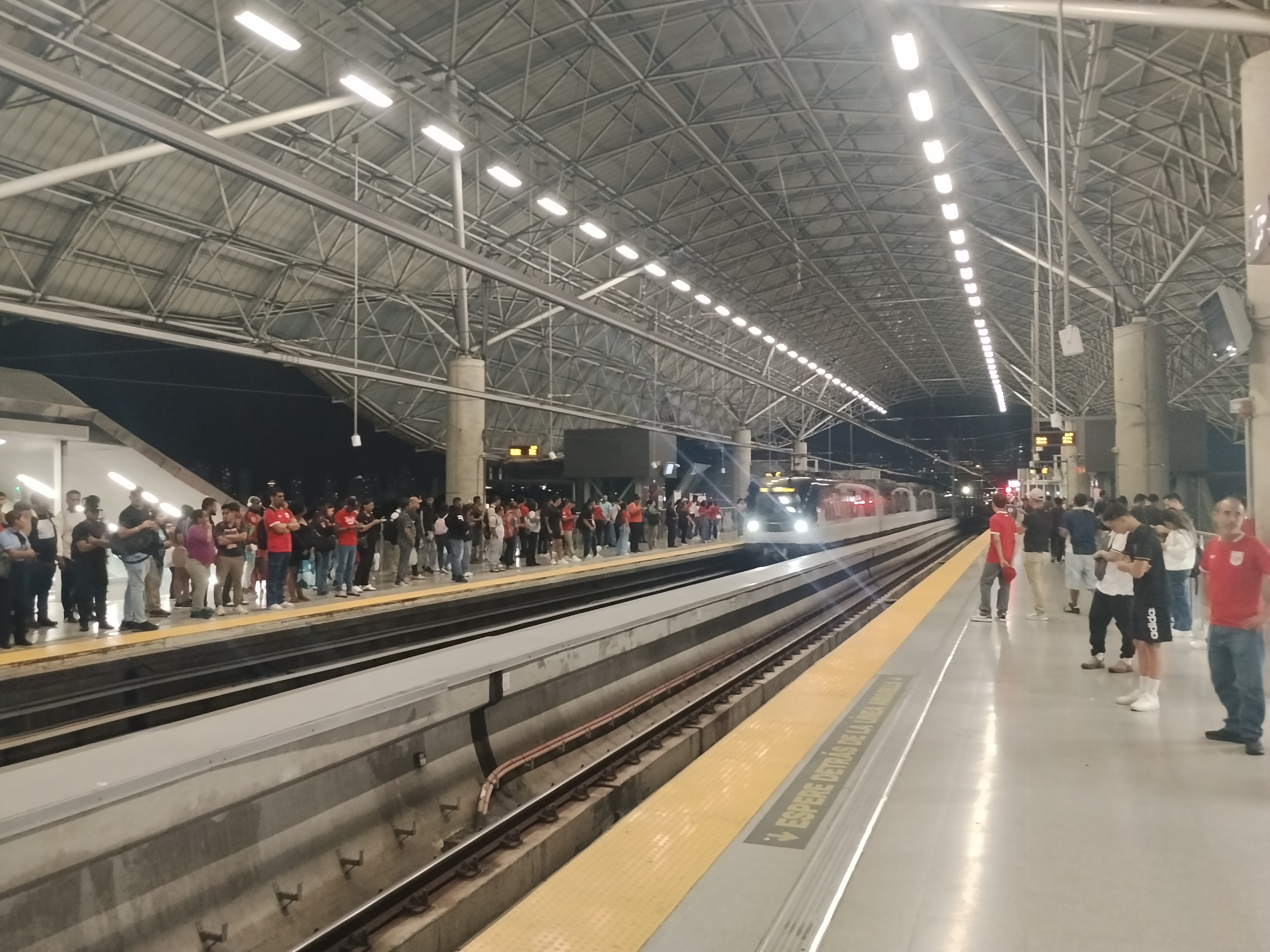
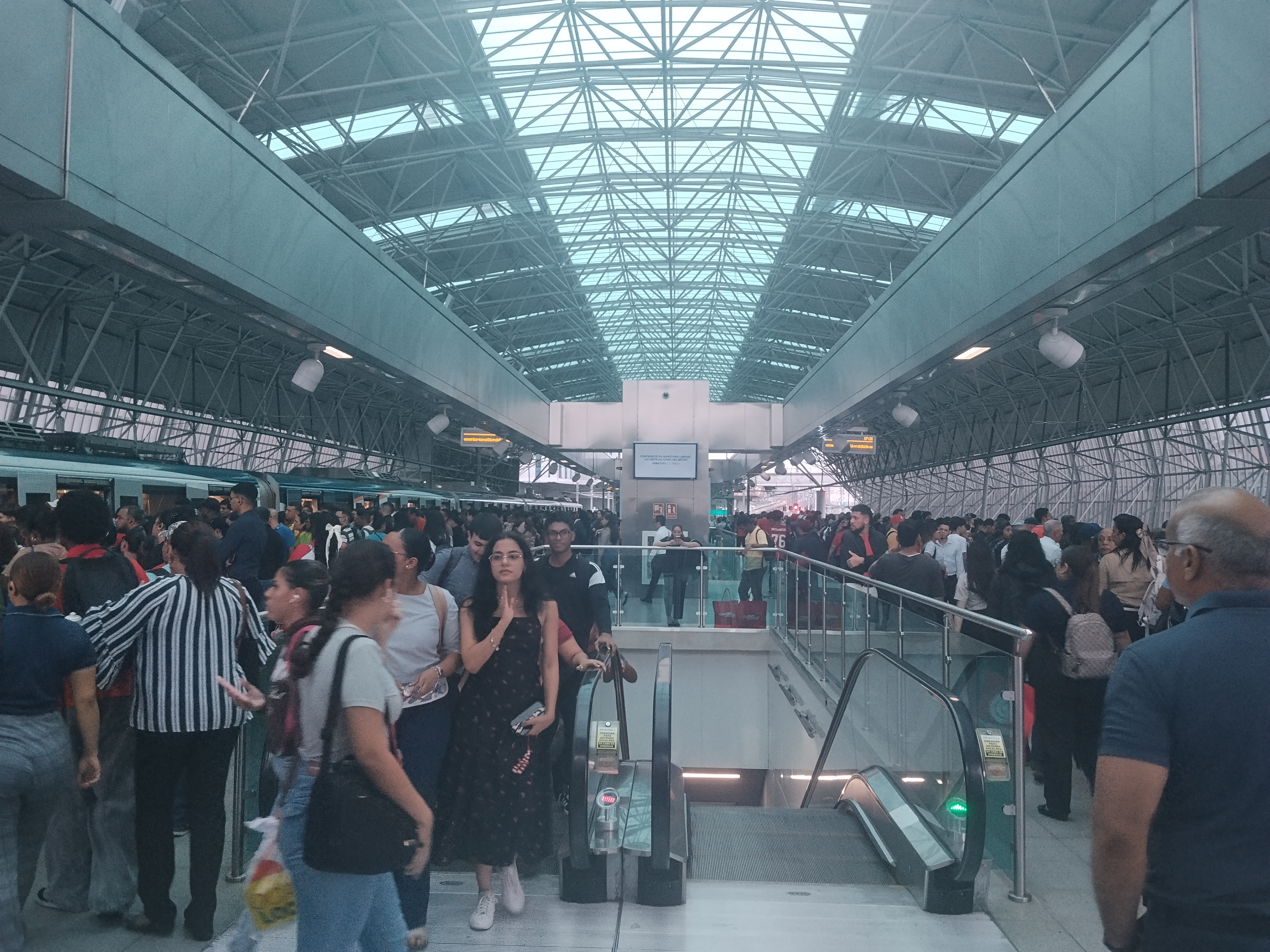
- Platforms of the San Miguelito station of Line 1 (above) and Line 2 (below).

General information
- Location: Victoriano Lorenzo, San Miguelito; Panama Province; Panama
- Coordinates: 9°01′49″N 79°30′23″W
- Platforms: 2 side platforms (Line 1); 1 island platform (Line 2)
- Tracks: 4

Construction
- Structure type: Elevated
- Accessible: Yes

History
- Opened: 5 April 2014; 12 years ago

Services
Preceding station	Panama Metro	Following station
Pueblo Nuevo toward Albrook	Line 1	Pan de Azúcar toward Villa Zaita
Terminus	Line 2	Paraíso toward Nuevo Tocumen
Location

San Miguelito station is a Panama Metro station. It is an interchange station on Line 1 and Line 2. It was one of the first 11 stations when the metro began operations on 6 April 2014. It is the third of seven elevated stations when travelling towards the terminus of Villa Zaita.

The station is located in San Miguelito District. As of 2015, it was the fourth most used station on the network at peak times, carrying 13% of the network's passengers.

The station is located near La Gran Estación, one of Panama City's main bus terminals.

In October 2016, construction of the station's line 2 platforms began. The Line 2 station was opened on 25 April 2019 as the western terminus of the initial section of Line 2 between San Miguelito and Nuevo Tocumen.
