= Nuevo Tocumen metro station =

Panama metro station

Estación Nuevo Tocumen
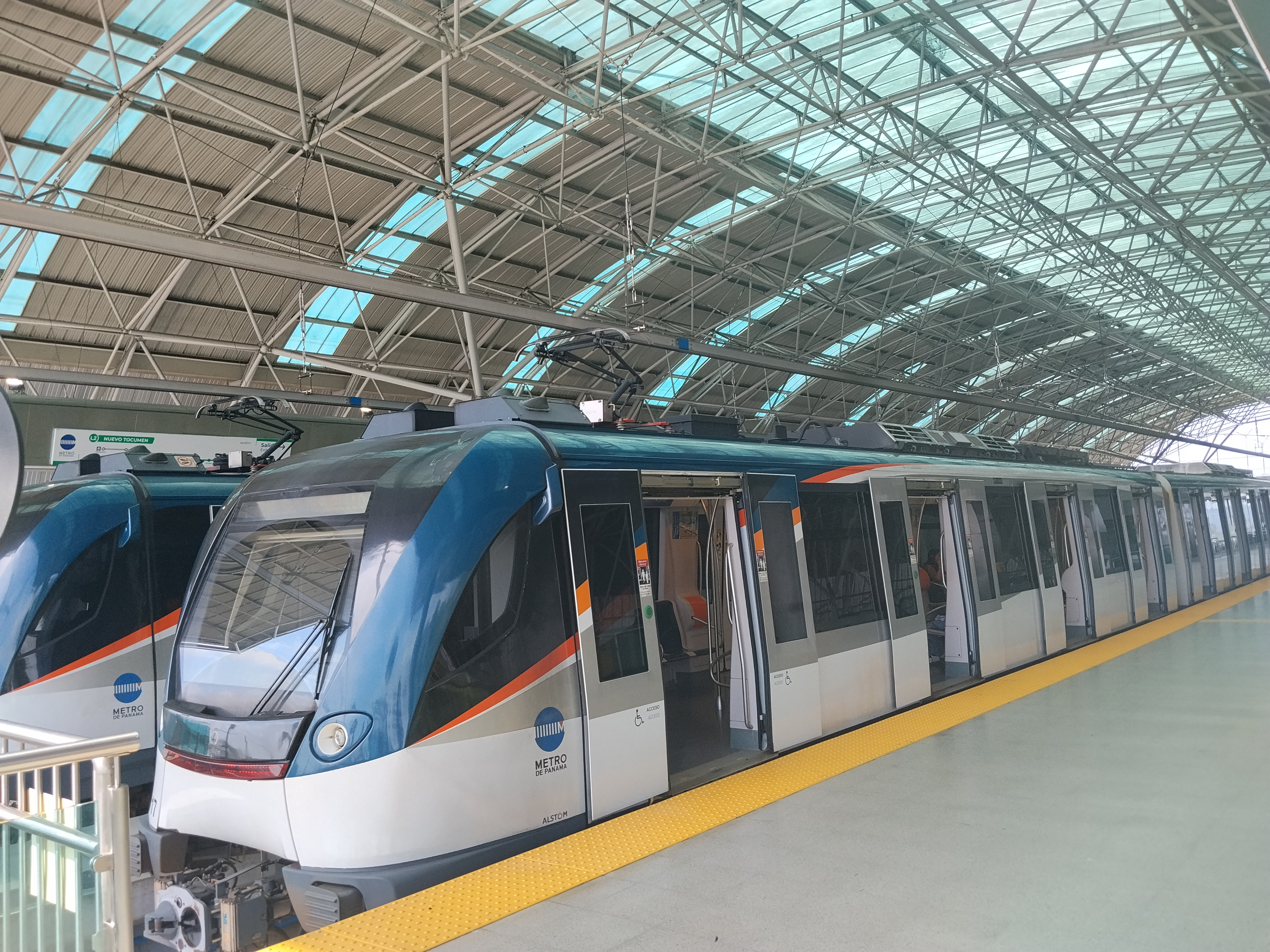

General information
- Location: Pan-American Highway; 24 de Diciembre, Panama District; Panama City; Panama
- Coordinates: 9°06′06.9″N 79°21′12.5″W
- System: Panama Metro station
- Line: Line 2

History
- Opened: 25 April 2019; 7 years ago

Services
| Preceding station | Panama Metro | Following station |
|---|---|---|
| 24 de Diciembre toward San Miguelito | Line 2 | Terminus |
Location

Nuevo Tocumen is a Panama Metro station on Line 2. It was opened on 25 April 2019 as the eastern terminus of the inaugural section of Line 2 between San Miguelito and Nuevo Tocumen. This is an elevated station built above the Pan-American Highway. This station gives access to Megamall. The adjacent station is 24 de Diciembre.
