= Panama Metro =

Rapid transit system in Panama City, Panama

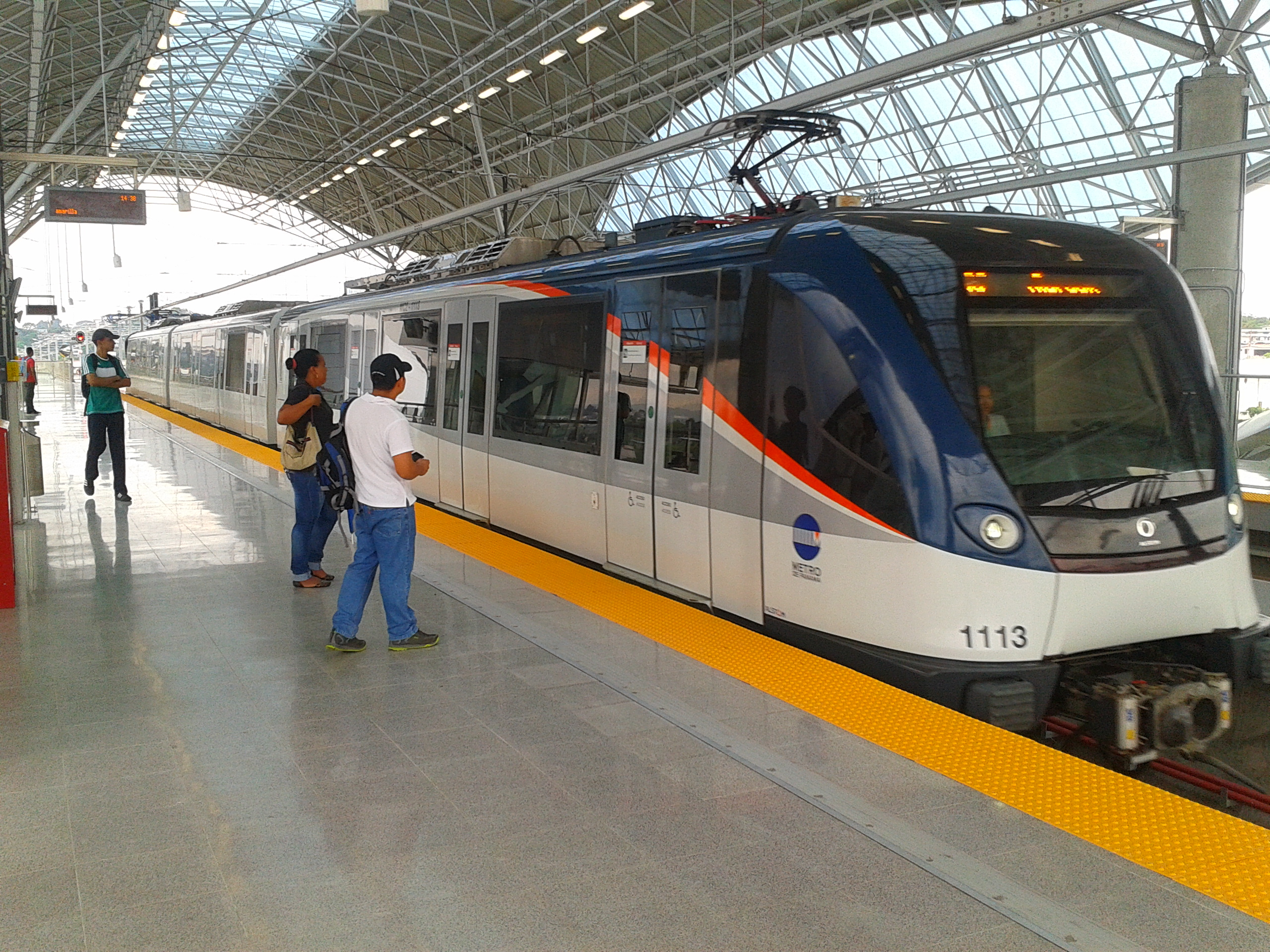
- Alstom Metropolis trainset on Line 1 (2014)

Overview
- Native name: Metro de Panamá
- Owner: Metro de Panamá, S.A. (state owned enterprise)
- Locale: Panama City, Panama
- Transit type: Rapid transit
- Number of lines: 2 (+1 under construction)
- Number of stations: 33
- Daily ridership: 420,000 (March 2026)
- Annual ridership: 116,088,070
- Website: elmetrodepanama.com

Operation
- Began operation: April 6, 2014; 12 years ago
- Character: Fully grade separated (underground and elevated)
- Number of vehicles: 47 Alstom Metropolis
- Train length: 5-car trainsets

Technical
- System length: 42.1 km (26.2 mi)
- Track gauge: 1,435 mm (4 ft 8 1/2 in) standard gauge
- Electrification: 1,500 V DC from overhead catenary (Lines 1 & 2) or third rail (Line 3)
System map

The Panama Metro (Spanish: Metro de Panamá) is a rapid transit system serving Panama City, Panama. Developed to ease traffic congestion between the city and the San Miguelito District and to provide an alternative to road transport, the metro supplements the MiBus network and operates daily throughout the year.

Line 1 opened on April 6, 2014 and spans 18.1 kilometres (11.2 mi) with 15 stations. Line 2 followed in 2019, temporarily opening for World Youth Day in late January and later entering regular service on April 25 of that year. It extends 24 kilometres (15 mi) with 18 stations, including a branch to Tocumen International Airport that opened in 2023. The San Miguelito station serves as the interchange between the two lines.

The metro is part of a broader National Master Plan to improve transportation around Panama City, which includes the construction of two additional rapid transit lines, two monorail lines, three tram lines, and an aerial lift line.

== History ==
=== Line 1 ===
==== Development ====
The government of Panama invited tenders for a contract to build the metro system. The governments of Brazil and Taiwan offered to invest on the project. After an exhaustive inspection of all proposals for the construction of the railway system, the Línea Uno consortium, which includes the Spanish Fomento de Construcciones y Contratas (FCC), won the contract.

In October 2009, the POYRY/Cal y Mayor y Asociados consortium won the contract for counseling the project development, and in January 2010, Systra was awarded a contract to create detailed infrastructure designs.

The first phase of the project consisted of planning, cost estimation, and technical feasibility. The second phase consisted of several soil studies, topography, and demand refinings. Both phases were started and executed simultaneously in late 2009.

==== Construction ====
In December 2010, the government finally awarded the tender for the construction of the subway. The third and the fourth phases of the project took place between 2011 and 2012 and consisted of the construction of all viaducts and stations and the relocation of the public utilities. The control center that supervises the whole metro operations and the Automatic Train Supervision was provided by Thales, along with the network infrastructure and communication and security solutions including CCTV, telephony, intercom, TETRA radio, visual and audio information to passengers, and fire detection.

By September 2013, construction of Line 1 was 92% complete, which allowed a test run with some of the rolling stock.

==== Cost ====
The construction of Line 1 cost $1.452 billion. The authority in charge of the planning, construction, and execution of the project had a budget of $200 million for the year 2012. In December 2011, the Secretaría del Metro de Panamá clarified that the updated cost of the project is US$1.880 billion, including public utilities relocations and engineering and project management costs. The final cost for Line 1, including its extension to Villa Zaita was approximately US$2.2 billion.

==== Early operations ====
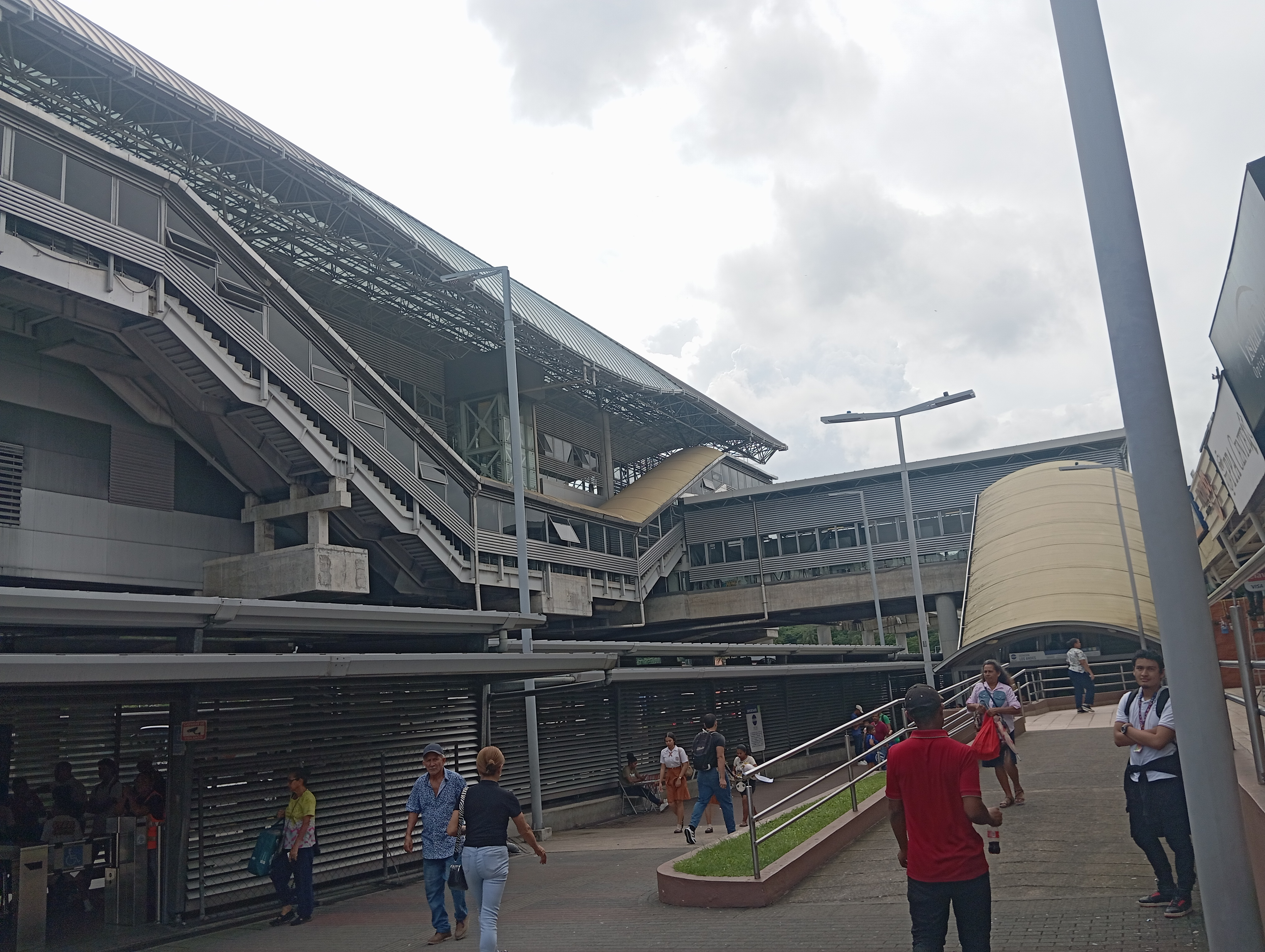
Los Andes station is the most used on Line 1.

On April 5, 2014, Line 1 was opened, and the first public passenger trips on the new system were carried out. The next day, the line entered active passenger revenue service. In its first year of operations, the system carried 200,000 people per day on average, 25% more than had been expected.

The initial segment of Panama Metro's Line 1 ran over a mostly north–south route, from Los Andes to the Albrook bus station (where the system's maintenance shop is located), and extended over 13.7 kilometres (8.5 mi) of route, including 7.2 kilometres (4.5 mi) underground and 6.5 kilometres (4.0 mi) elevated. Initially, Line 1 had 11 passenger stations: 5 elevated, 5 underground, and 1 at-grade; 3 more stations were later added. The twelfth station, Lotería, which was the sixth underground station, opened on August 27, 2014. The El Ingenio subway station, located between the underground Fernández de Córdoba station and the first elevated station, 12 de Octubre, was originally scheduled to open in August 2014, but it opened on May 8, 2015.

The original northern terminus station of the metro was Los Andes. However, it was a temporary terminus station since the government had approved an extension of Line 1 to a final elevated station in San Isidro. San Isidro was also originally scheduled to open in August 2014, but it finally opened on August 15, 2015. The extension to San Isidro added 2.1 kilometres (1.3 mi) of route to the system and extended the metro's total route length to 15.8 kilometres (9.8 mi). The line was extended an additional 2.3 kilometres (1.4 mi) to the north to a new terminus at Villa Zaita which opened on April 25, 2024, bringing the total line length to 18.1 kilometres (11.2 mi).

=== Line 2 ===
==== Development ====
On May 16, 2014, three different consortiums offered several proposals for the planning, cost estimation, and technical feasibility of Line 2 of the system. After making a detailed inquiry of all proposals, the Metro de Panama secretary announced on July 12, 2014, that the PML2 consortium, which includes the Spanish "Ayesa Ingeniería y Arquitectura", the "Barcelona Metro", and the American "Louis Berger Group," had been awarded the contract. The project was to cost $2.200 billion. It ended up costing only $1.857 billion.

The construction contract was awarded to Linea 2 Consortium, formed by Odebrecht from Brazil and FCC from Spain, the same consortium that built Line 1 of the Panama Metro. Construction officially started in September 2015. Originally, Line 2 had to be delivered in April 2019, but since Panama City was hosting the Catholic World Youth Summit in January 2019, construction was being accelerated, and a new delivery date was announced as December 31, 2018, to serve the one million tourists who were expected to attend the summit. However, in 2018, a month-long labor strike eroded over US$900 million from the annual GDP figure and caused the same amount of losses. That pushed back the delivery date to the original delivery date. However, the first test ran with 12 trains for 8 hours was conducted on December 28, with a partial opening on January 15 with five stations for the summit. The line was then closed again and re-opened on the original date. In August 2018, it was announced that Line 2 would operate partially from Corredor Sur to San Miguelito 24 hours a day during the summit. In January 2019, it was announced that Line 2 would open from January 18 to 28, with five stations operating, including 42 hours of continuous operations on the 26th and the 27th.

Line 2 was formally opened on April 25, 2019.

On March 16, 2023, a branch of Line 2, known as El Ramal, connecting Corredor Sur and Tocumen International Airport, Aeropuerto, was opened. There are no through trains to Aeropuerto, the trains start at Corredor Sur.

The final cost of Line 2, including the branch to Tocumen International Airport, is about US$2.13 billion.

=== Line 3 ===
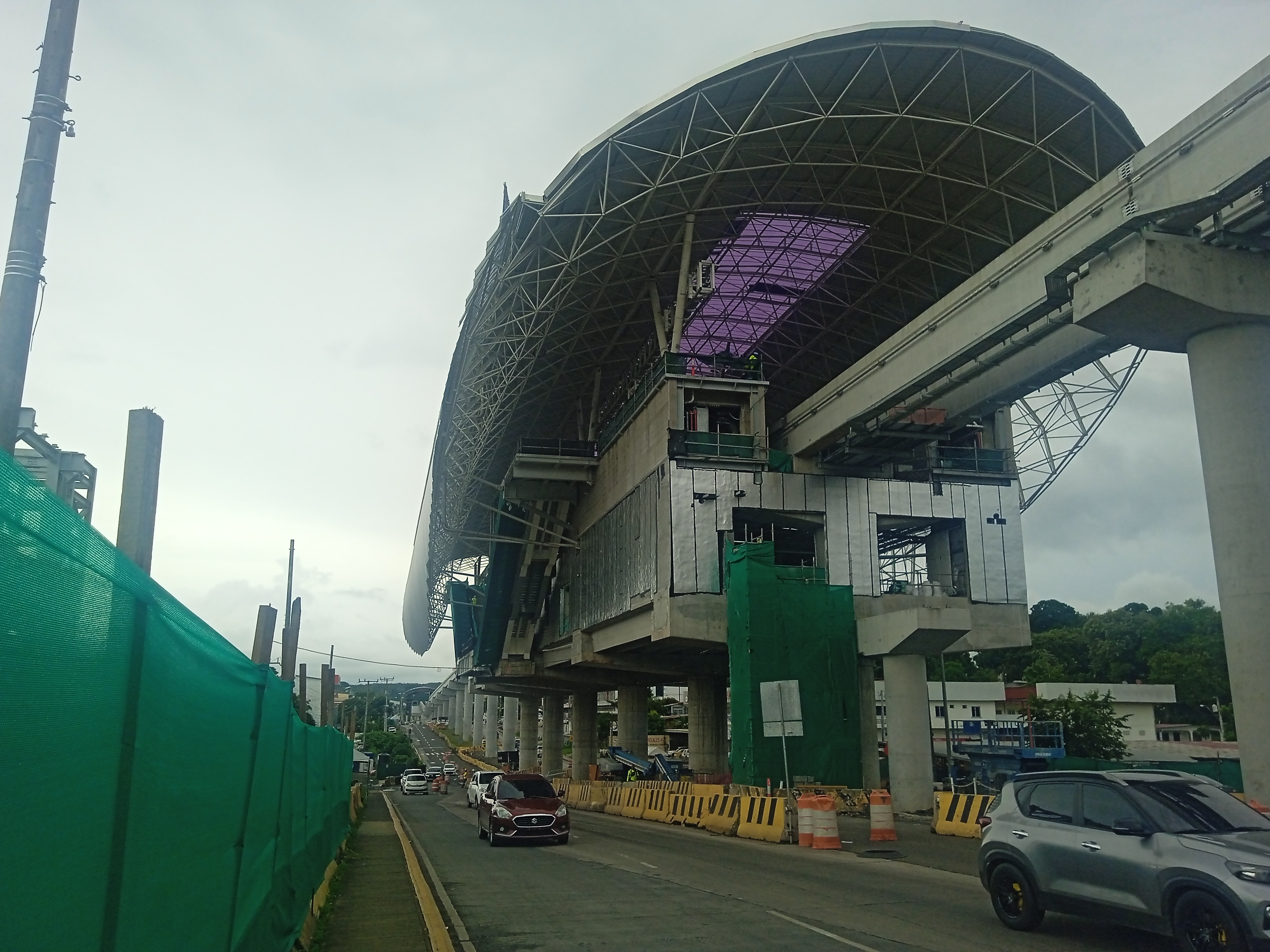
Nuevo Arraiján station under construction, August 2025

Line 3 is a 24.5-kilometre (15.2 mi) monorail with 11 stations currently under construction, linking Ciudad del Futuro in the Arraiján District with Albrook station in Panama City, where it will connect to Line 1. The line is expected to serve a daily demand of 160,000 passengers with a travel time of 37 minutes, significantly reducing journey times between West Panama and the capital. The project is financed through loans from the Japanese government via the Japan International Cooperation Agency (JICA). It will become the first Japanese-technology monorail in Latin America, with rolling stock supplied by Hitachi Rail.

Originally, the project featured a fully elevated route that would have used the Fourth Bridge over the Panama Canal. However, in early 2020, the design was changed due to the lack of financing guarantees for the bridge and to reduce costs. As a result, the line was redesigned and split into two phases: Phase 1 (Remaining Original Section - TOR), an elevated segment of 19 kilometres (12 mi) between Ciudad del Futuro and Panamá Pacífico; and Phase 2, an underground section of approximately 6 kilometres (3.7 mi) between Panamá Pacífico and Albrook. This second phase includes sections built using Cut & Cover, NATM, and TBM methods with a 13.5 metres (44 ft) diameter tunnel boring machine. The standout feature is the 4.5 kilometres (2.8 mi) tunnel beneath the canal, reaching a maximum depth of 65 meters (213 ft) below sea level.

These modifications contributed to a sharp rise in costs, from the initial US$2.6 billion estimate to more than US$4 billion. Additional cost increases were attributed to nationwide protests in 2023 involving much of the project’s union labor, delays to a nearby highway project that impacted construction, and higher materials costs due to the COVID-19 pandemic and the war in Ukraine. In an effort to contain costs, three planned stations were removed (though they may be built in the future), landscaping and architectural finishes were reduced, and the train fleet was decreased from 28 to 26 six-car trains. While the final cost of Line 3 remains undetermined, it is expected to significantly exceed the cost of the first two metro lines.

Construction began in February 2021 under the HPH Joint Venture Consortium comprising three Korean companies: Hyundai Engineering & Construction, Posco Engineering & Construction, and Hyundai Engineering. As of May 2026, overall progress stands at 75%. Phase 1 is 85% complete and is expected to be finished in April 2027. Phase 2 is 58% complete and is scheduled for completion in October 2028, when commercial operations of the line are planned to begin. The tunnel boring machine Panamá, operated by subcontractor China Railway Tunnel Group (CRTG), will resume operations after a three-month maintenance period to complete the remaining section from Balboa to Albrook, where it is expected to arrive in September, finishing its work and allowing progress with the installation of beams and evacuation structures in the section under the Canal. Dynamic testing of the line with the full fleet of 26 trains began on April 13 between Ciudad del Futuro and San Bernardino, and will progressively extend to Panamá Pacífico as civil works on the elevated section are completed.

== Operations ==
=== Line 1 ===
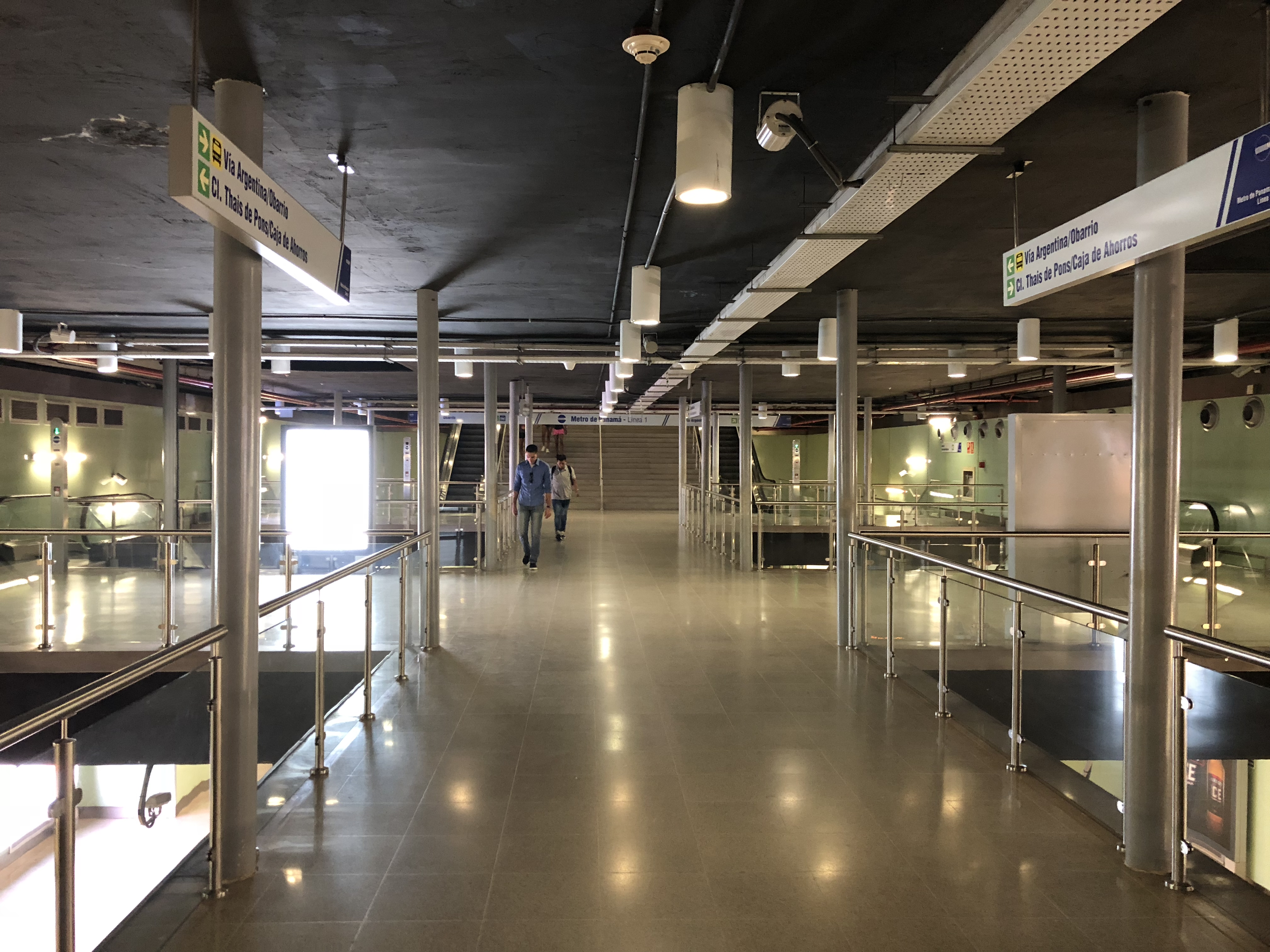
Mezzanine of the Vía Argentina station

Line 1 runs along a primarily north–south route between Villa Zaita and Albrook, which also houses a maintenance facility. The line is 18 kilometres (11 mi) long, including about 7.2 kilometres (4.5 mi) underground. It has 15 stations: 7 elevated, 7 underground, and 1 at-grade, each with platforms approximately 110 metres (360 ft) in length. A complete journey takes about 33 minutes.

The route begins at Villa Zaita, continues on viaduct through San Isidro, Los Andes, and San Miguelito, then transitions to a trench and underground section through central Panama City. The line terminates at Albrook, which connects directly to the national bus terminal and the Albrook Mall.

=== Line 2 ===
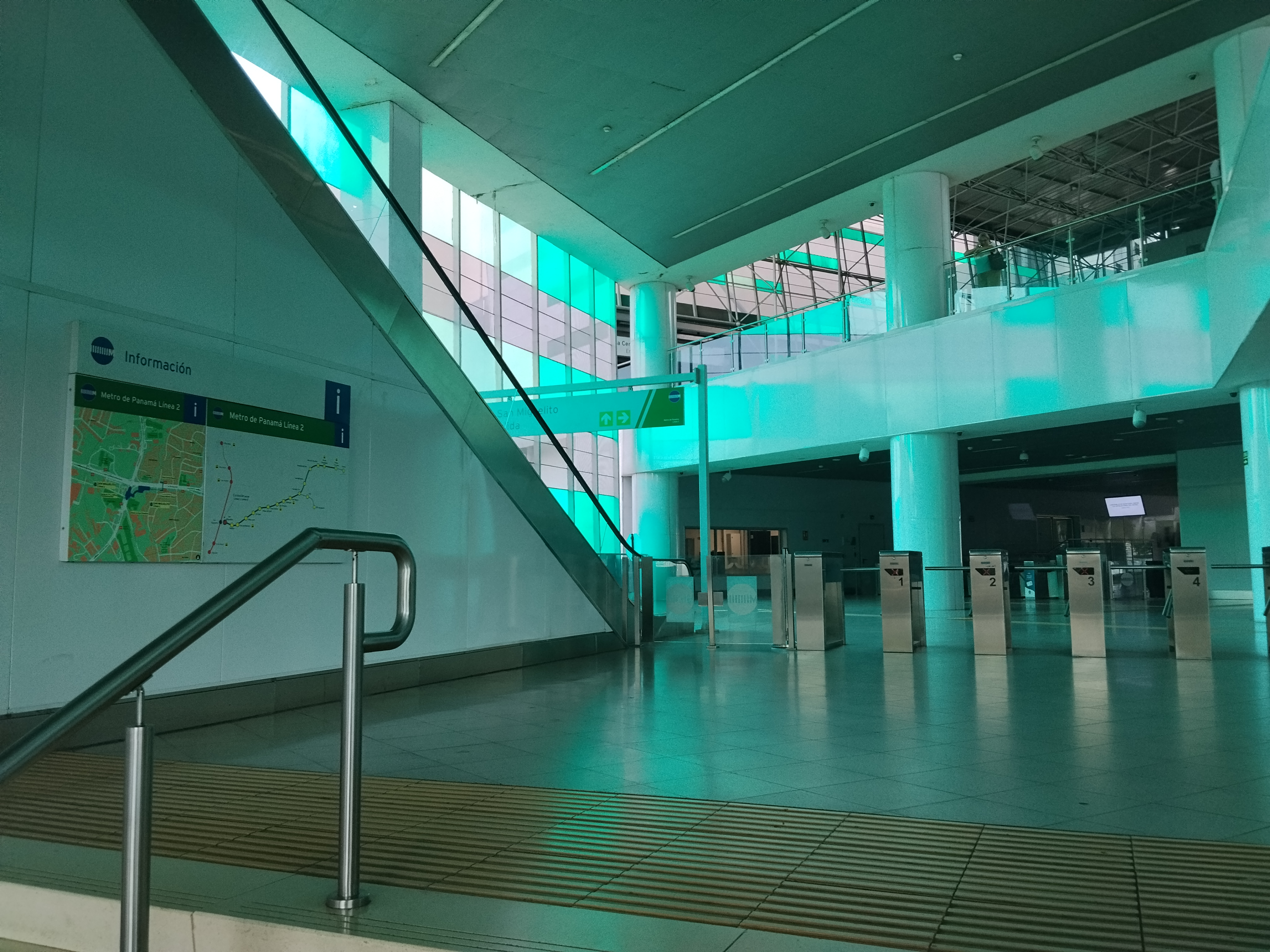
Turnstiles at the San Miguelito station on Line 2

Line 2 follows an east–west alignment from San Miguelito, where it interchanges with Line 1, to Nuevo Tocumen, which includes the line's maintenance facilities. The main line is approximately 20.4 kilometres (12.7 mi) long and has 18 stations, all elevated. An additional 2.5 kilometres (1.6 mi) of service tracks link the line to Line 1 at the west end and the yard at the north end. Platforms are the same length as those on Line 1. Line 2 opened on April 25, 2019.

In March 2023, a 2.1-kilometre (1.3 mi) three-station branch known as El Ramal opened, linking the main route at Corredor Sur station to Tocumen International Airport.

=== Operating hours ===
The metro operates daily throughout the year. Trains generally operate from 05:00 to 23:00 on weekdays, from 05:00 to 22:00 on Saturdays and from 07:00 to 22:00 on Sundays and public holidays.

=== Rolling stock ===
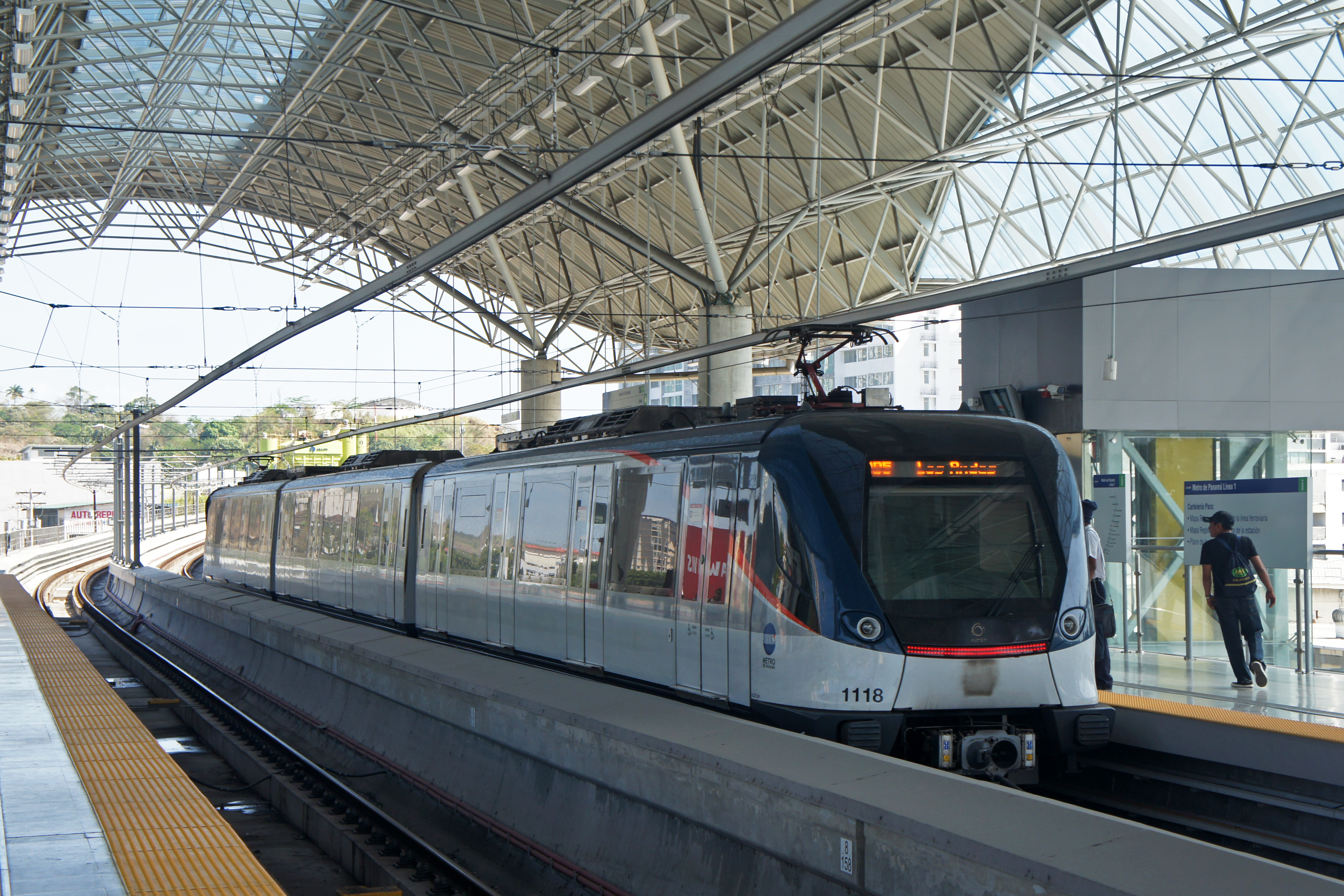
3-car train at the 12 de Octubre station (2015).

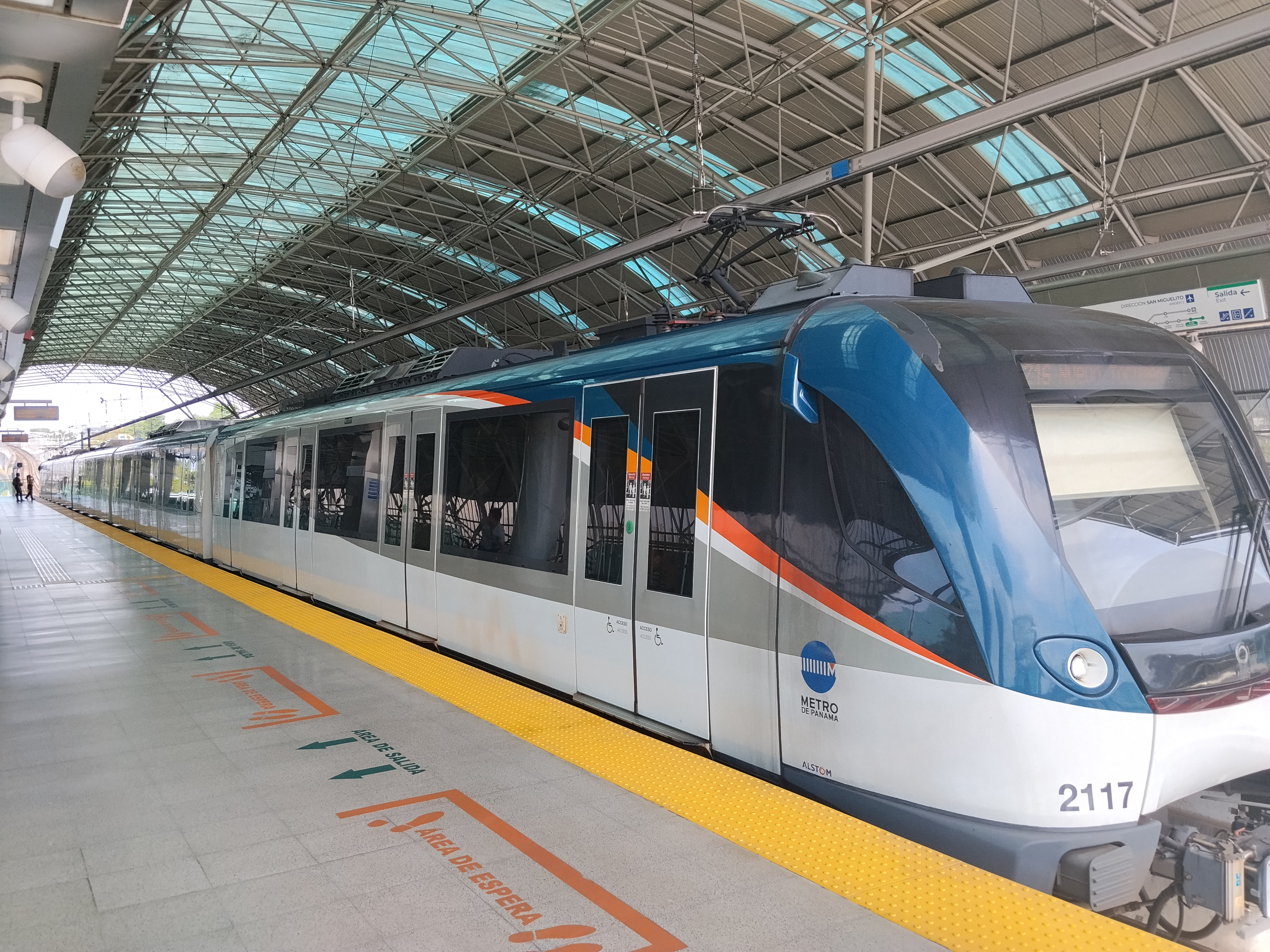
5-car train at the 24 de Diciembre station (2026).

The system currently operates 47 Alstom Metropolis 9000 trains, with Line 1 having 26 trains and Line 2 having 21. These are similar to the Barcelona Metro 9000 Series and were built at Alstom’s factory in that city, with testing carried out on the FGC network. The first three units arrived in Panama on May 25, 2013, and began operations on April 5, 2014, with a fleet of 19 three-car trains with a capacity of 600 passengers, even though Line 1 stations were designed to handle five-car formations. The first five-car train entered service in February 2018, marking the start of the conversion period of trains from three to five cars. Line 2, for its part, has always operated with five-car trains of exactly the same model, allowing train exchanges between both lines via a connecting track at San Miguelito station.

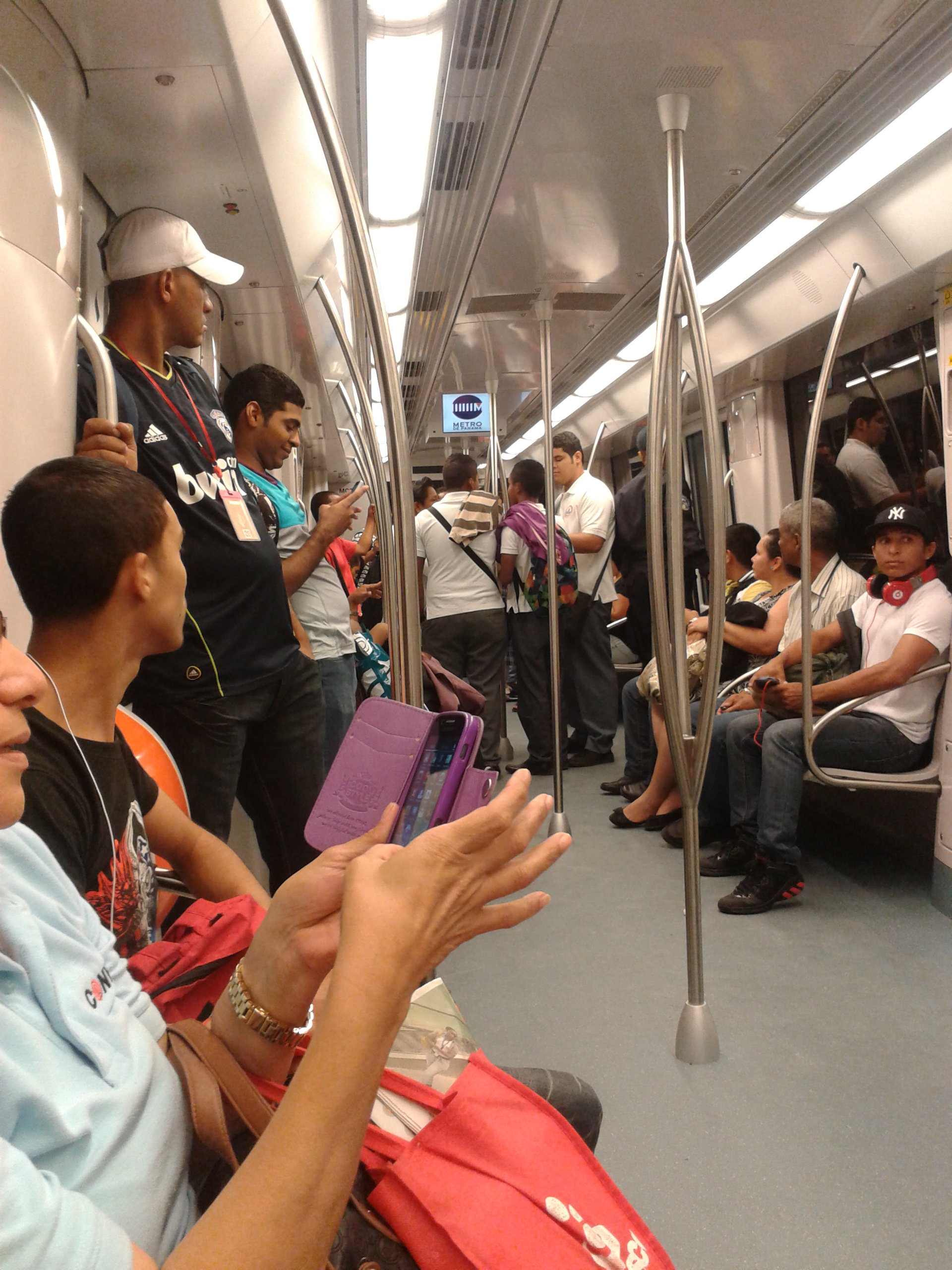
Interior of a train

In response to a sustained increase in ridership driven in part by rising fuel prices, the Panama Metro implemented temporary operational measures starting May 11, 2026. These include allowing boarding from both platforms at terminal stations: Villa Zaita and Albrook on Line 1, and San Miguelito on Line 2, during peak hours. Trains depart terminals at approximately 50% capacity to improve passenger availability at subsequent stations. If the measures prove effective in reducing wait times and managing demand, they may become permanent. The authority is also considering the purchase of eight additional trains to address the growing service demand.

The standard-gauge trainsets feature air-conditioning, on-board CCTV, passenger information systems, and a capacity of approximately 1,000 passengers. Trains draw 1,500 V DC power from a rigid overhead conductor rail via pantograph, while substations are supplied with 13.8 kV AC at 60 Hz. The exterior design is characterized by a predominance of white, combined with metallic gray and dark blue details, as well as two subtle diagonal lines in orange and white that run along the sides.

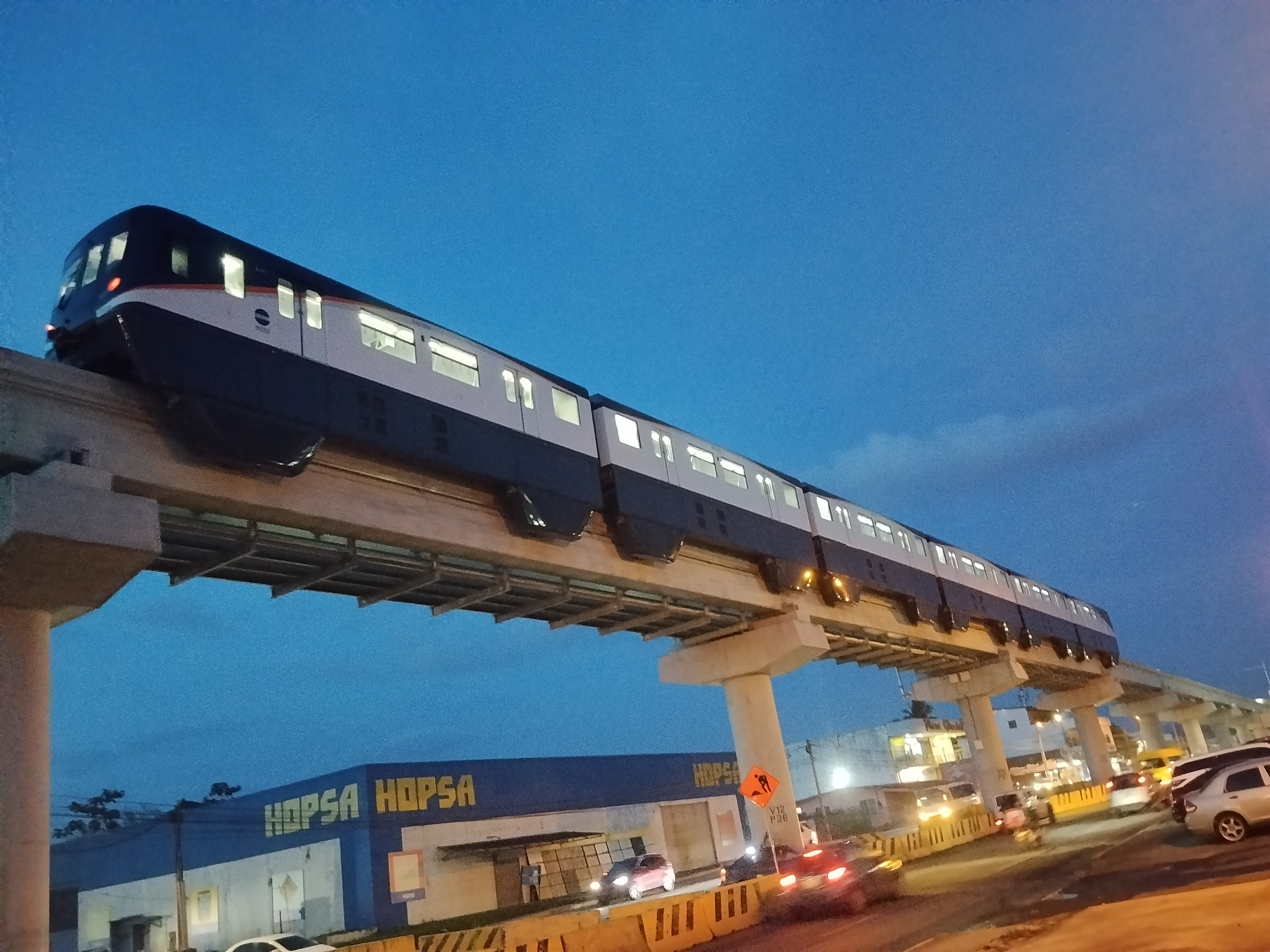
Line 3 Hitachi Monorail passing through Nuevo Arraiján.

Line 3 will be served by 26 six-car Hitachi Monorail trains supplied by Hitachi in collaboration with its subsidiary Hitachi Rail STS and Mitsubishi Corporation. These straddle-type monorail vehicles, manufactured at Hitachi’s Kasado factory in Japan, draw design inspiration from the Osaka Monorail 3000 Series. Each trainset has an approximate capacity of 1,000 passengers and incorporates features such as Hitachi’s B-CHOP energy storage system for regenerative braking. The first trainsets arrived in Panama in early 2024, and dynamic testing on the elevated viaduct had begun by 2026.

== Planned expansion ==
The Panama Metro system is eventually planned to expand to a ten-line network by 2035–2040. The plan envisions four rapid transit lines, three tram lines, two monorail lines in the Arraiján District, and an aerial lift line in the San Miguelito District. Current projects focus on the construction of Line 3, the extensions of Lines 2 and 3, and preparatory studies for additional lines.

=== Line 1 ===
Line 1 is nearly complete in its current form. An infill station at Curundú, near the southern end of the line, was part of the original plans but had not been built as of March 2025. A further extension to La Cabima was studied but ruled out by metro officials in 2025.

=== Line 2 ===
Line 2 is planned to extend westward from San Miguelito station primarily along Via Ricardo J. Alfaro (Tumba Muerto), where at some point the elevated section goes underground, terminating in Paitilla, in southern Panama City and near the Cinta Costera. This segment, known as Line 2A, would add 9.2 kilometres (5.7 mi), 11 stations, and a second interchange with Line 1 at Iglesia del Carmen station. Because of tunneling costs, the extension is projected to be as expensive as the entire existing line. A one-station extension eastward from Nuevo Tocumen to Felipillo is also planned. In addition, a branch line has been proposed from Condado del Rey along the Vía Centenario to MERCA Panamá.

=== Line 3 ===
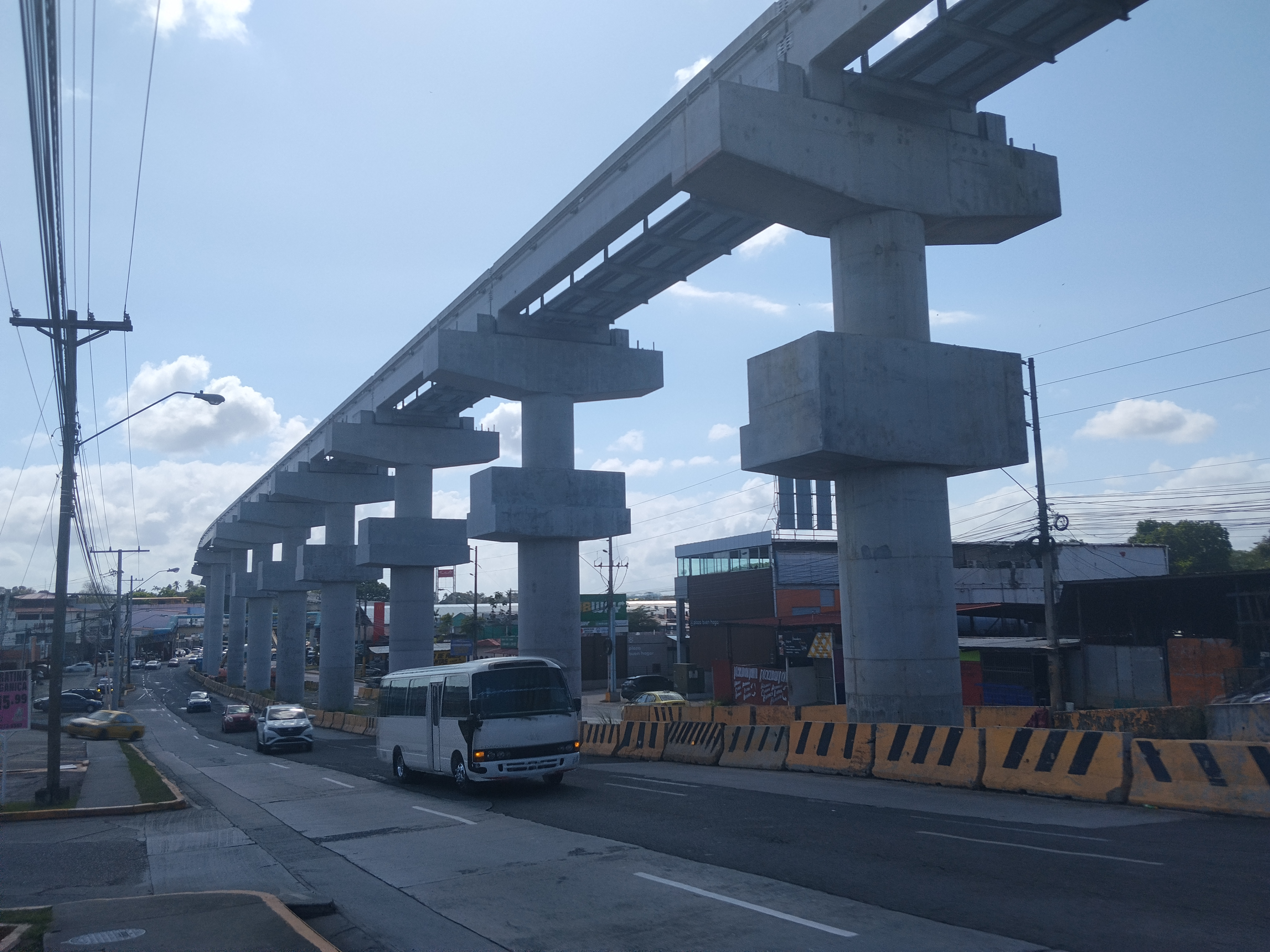
Area established for Vista Alegre 2 station.

Line 3, in its inaugural section, has three pending infill stations: Vista Alegre 2, Arraiján 2, and Balboa. The first two are elevated stations whose construction was officially suspended in 2022 due to increased project costs, in an effort to save money. As for Balboa, which had already been converted from an elevated to an underground station, was postponed until late 2024. In addition to financial considerations, the postponement was based on the argument that the station would have low initial ridership, so an evacuation shaft and a technical building were constructed instead. However, preparations are in place to allow for the future construction of these three stations, minimizing the impact on the Line's operation.

Furthermore, an extension of the line towards La Chorrera is being analyzed, divided into two stages: the first of 3.2 km to Costa Verde, and the second that would reach the center of the district, specifically to Parque Libertador. During an interview conducted in May 2026, Carlos Cedeño, Director of Engineering and Projects for the Panama Metro, stated that the current system can feasibly reach as far as Costa Verde. Beyond that point, other alternatives are being evaluated due to road conditions, aiming for a less invasive solution.

=== Lines 4 and 5 (rapid transit) ===
Lines 4 and 5 are planned rapid transit expansions that will use trains similar to those on Lines 1 and 2, with both lines scheduled to open by 2040.

Line 4 would begin at a planned infill station in Curundú on Line 1. Early plans envision a route that would follow Avenida Nacional, Avenida Transístmica and Avenida España, intersecting Line 1 again at Fernández de Córdoba station, then continuing through Pueblo Nuevo and Río Abajo along Avenida José Agustín Arango. It would connect with Line 5 near the Ciudad Deportiva area before serving southern Juan Díaz and terminating at Don Bosco Tocumen in Tocumen.

Line 5 is a proposed underground line serving Panama City's financial district, designed to relieve congestion in one of the busiest commercial corridors. Early plans envision a route that would begin at Santo Tomás station on Line 1 and run along Calle 50 through Parque Urraca, Bella Vista, San Francisco and Parque Lefevre, continuing to Costa del Este and Santa María before ending at El Crisol station on Line 2.

=== Lines 6, 7, and 8 (tram) ===
Lines 6, 7, and 8 are planned tram services designed to cover medium-demand corridors not served by the metro.

Line 6 will run between Merca Panamá and Curundú, where a new infill station on Line 1 is proposed.

Line 7 will be tourist-oriented running from Curundú to the Casco Antiguo district.

Line 8 will connect eastern Panama City between Villa Zaita (transfer to Line 1), Villa María (transfer to the Metrocable), Don Bosco (transfer to Line 2), and Don Bosco Tocumen (transfer to Line 4).

=== Line 9 (monorail) ===
Line 9 is a proposed monorail that would run between Ciudad del Futuro (transfer to Line 3) and the Centennial Bridge, serving Vacamonte, Veracruz and Panamá Pacífico International Airport.

=== Metrocable (aerial lift) ===
The Metrocable, also known as the San Miguelito Cable Car, is a planned aerial lift system that will run north-south through the San Miguelito District, from Torrijos Carter to El Balboa, with a connection to Line 2 at the Cincuentenario station. It will be 6.6 kilometres (4.1 mi) long, six stations, and have a capacity to carry up to 3,600 passengers per hour. Construction is scheduled to begin in 2026 and be completed in 2028, with an estimated completion time of 24 months after the contract is awarded. The bidding process began on March 10, 2025.

The Master Plan proposes extending the route to the Villa María station of the future Line 8 in the north, and includes two additional proposed branches connecting to San Isidro and Los Andes stations on Line 1.

== See also ==
- List of metro systems
- List of North American rapid transit systems by ridership
- List of Latin American rail transit systems by ridership
- Odebrecht Case – Corruption investigation in Latin America
