= Panama Metro Line 3 =

Metro line in Panama City

Line 3 / Línea 3
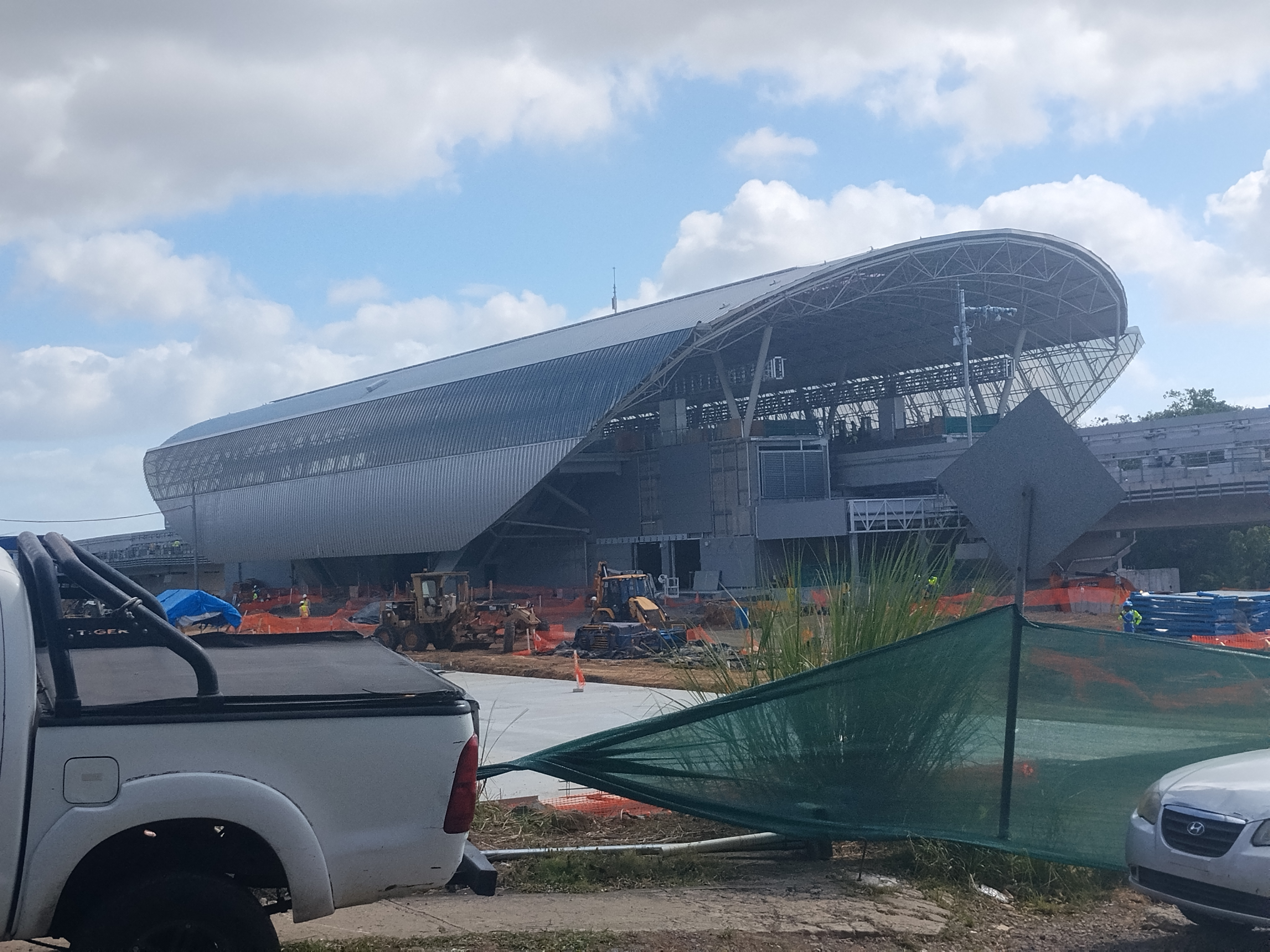
- Ciudad del Futuro terminal station

Overview
- Status: Under construction
- Locale: Panama City Metropolitan Area (Arraiján District and Panama City)
- Termini: Ciudad del Futuro; Albrook
- Connecting lines: Add→{{rail-interchange}} Albrook
- Stations: 14 in total: 11 under construction 3 planned
- Website: elmetrodepanama - In Spanish

Service
- Type: Straddle beam monorail
- System: Panama Metro
- Operator(s): Metro de Panamá, S.A.
- Depot(s): Ciudad del Futuro Yards and Workshops
- Rolling stock: Hitachi Monorail

History
- Opened: By October 2028 (planned)

Technical
- Line length: 24,497 m (15 mi)
- Electrification: 1,500 V DC from third rail

Line 3 (known as L3) will be a new line that will form part of the Panama Metro and will operate as a monorail system. It will have an approximate length of 24.5 kilometers and 11 stations, connecting the Panama Oeste Province with the Panamanian capital on an east-west route, from Ciudad del Futuro, where the yards and workshops are located, to Albrook, where it will connect with Line 1. It is estimated to serve a daily demand of 160,000 passengers and 20,000 passengers during peak hours. Its distinctive color is purple.

Construction began in February 2021, and by June 2026 overall progress stands at 77%. The elevated section between Ciudad del Futuro and Panamá Pacífico is 85% complete and is expected to be finished in April 2027. Meanwhile, the underground section between Panamá Pacífico and Albrook is 66% complete and is scheduled for completion in October 2028, when commercial operations of the line are planned to begin.

== History ==
Population Map of the Panama City Metropolitan Area in 2010.

Vehicle congestion in Panama and its surrounding areas worsened due to rapid economic growth and the increase in the number of motor vehicles. This led the government to create the "Secretaría del Metro de Panamá" (SMP) and develop a master plan for four lines. Line 3 emerged from this plan, intended to connect the capital with the western suburban areas of Arraiján and La Chorrera, which were suffering from severe traffic problems, deficient public transportation, and explosive population growth.

In this context, Japan’s Ministry of Economy, Trade and Industry (METI) carried out an initial study recommending the implementation of an elevated monorail system. The route would initially follow the Pan-American Highway before deviating onto the Autopista Arraiján-La Chorrera, taking advantage of its wide right-of-way. Subsequently, between 2013 and 2014, the Japan International Cooperation Agency (JICA), in collaboration with Japanese companies and the Metro Secretariat, conducted a feasibility study that established the definitive foundations of the project.

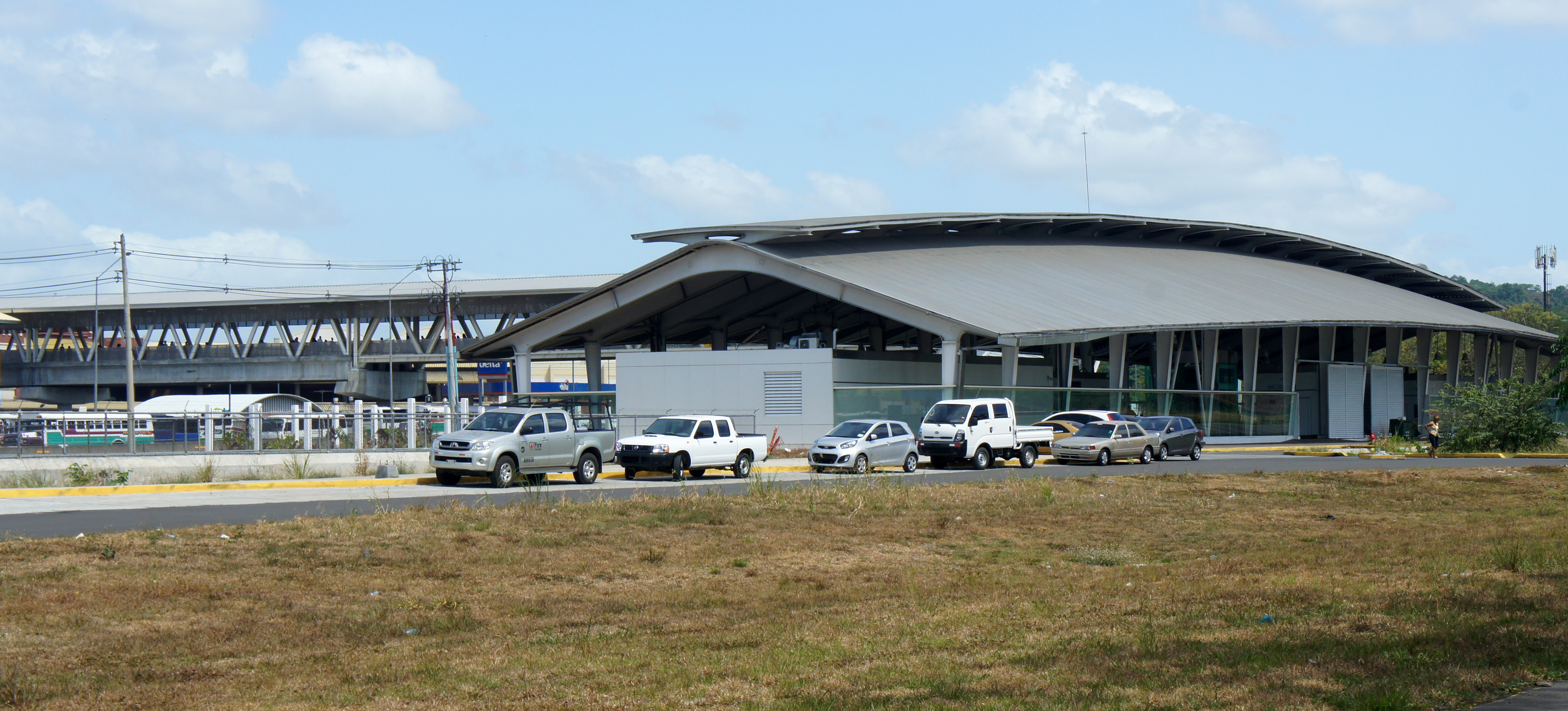
Albrook, the southern terminus of Line 1, was chosen as the eastern terminus of Line 3.

The study proposed, for the first phase, an elevated line of 26.7 km with 14 stations. It would begin at Albrook, where it would connect with Line 1, and split into two circuits: Albrook–Nuevo Chorrillo and Albrook–Ciudad del Futuro. The route would cross the Panama Canal via the Fourth Bridge and run parallel to the Pan-American Highway, as this alignment offered greater accessibility and higher demand than the "Autopista". The choice of a monorail was confirmed due to its better suitability for the steep slopes of West Panama. The trains would consist of six cars, and a large plot of land near Ciudad del Futuro was selected to house the depots and workshops. A second phase envisioned extending the line to Plaza Italia, at the entrance to La Chorrera.

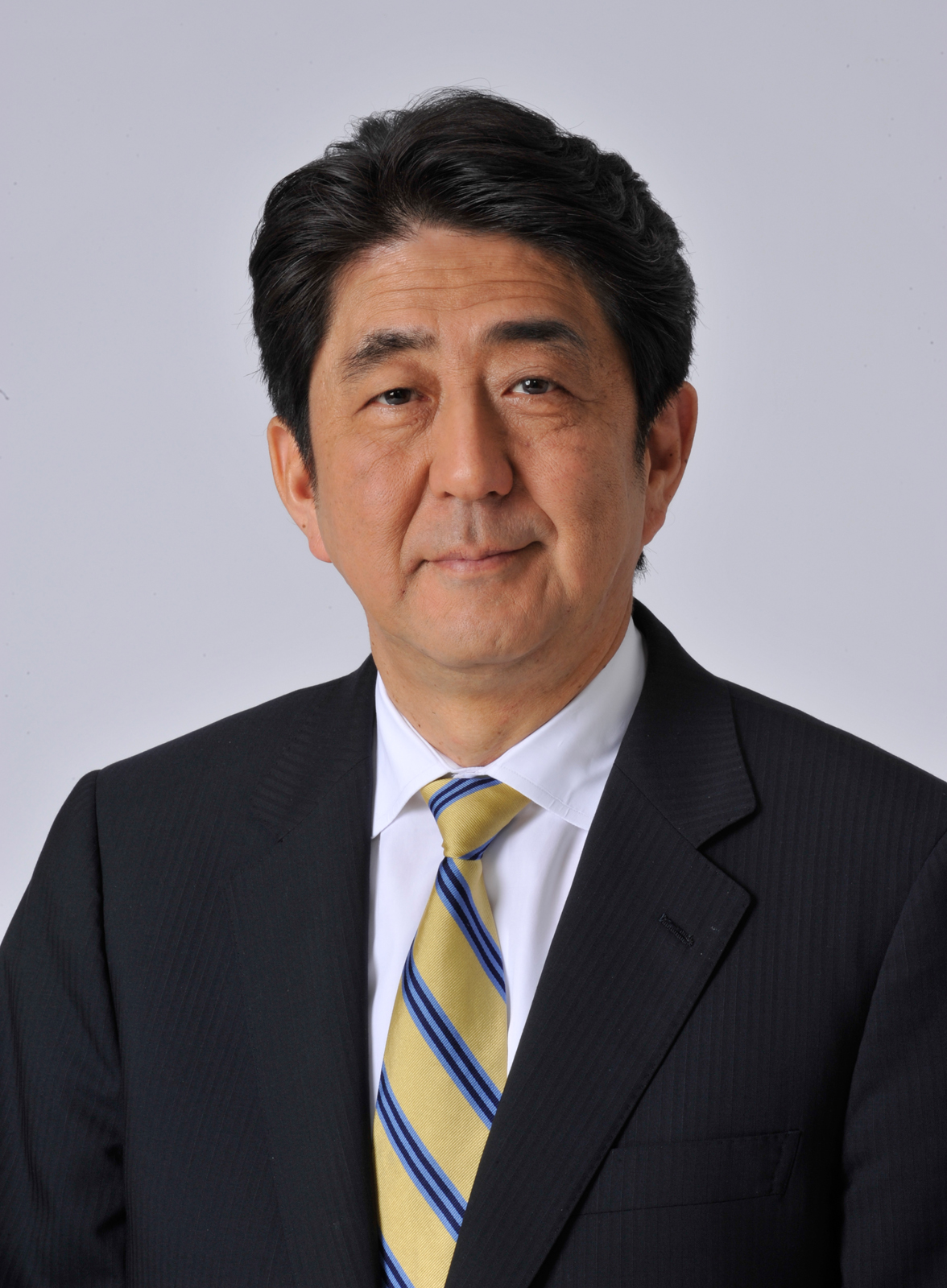
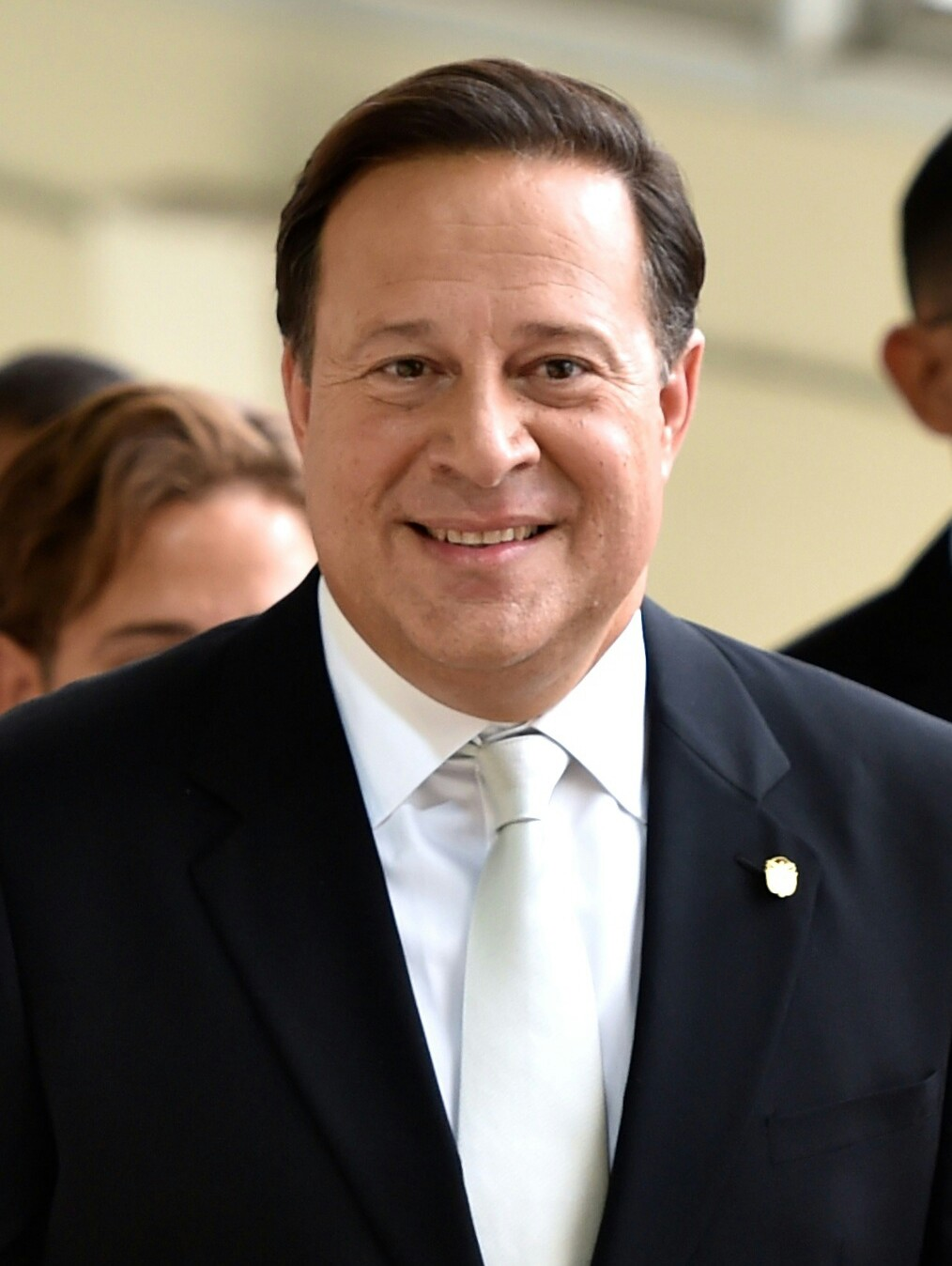
The leaders Shinzo Abe (left) and Juan Carlos Varela (right) witnessed the exchange of notes and the corresponding documentation.

On April 20, 2016, the governments of Panama and Japan signed a financing agreement for 2.6 billion dollars for the construction of Line 3, which will become the first monorail with Japanese technology and rolling stock in the Americas. The then Japanese Prime Minister, Shinzo Abe, described it as a historic milestone that would bring high-quality infrastructure to Panama and Latin America. The financing, granted by the Japan International Cooperation Agency (JICA), was structured with preferential conditions and a total term of 20 years, including 14 years of amortization, 6 years of grace, 3 years for disbursement, an interest rate of six-month Libor in yen minus 1.05%, and an initial commission of 0.20%.

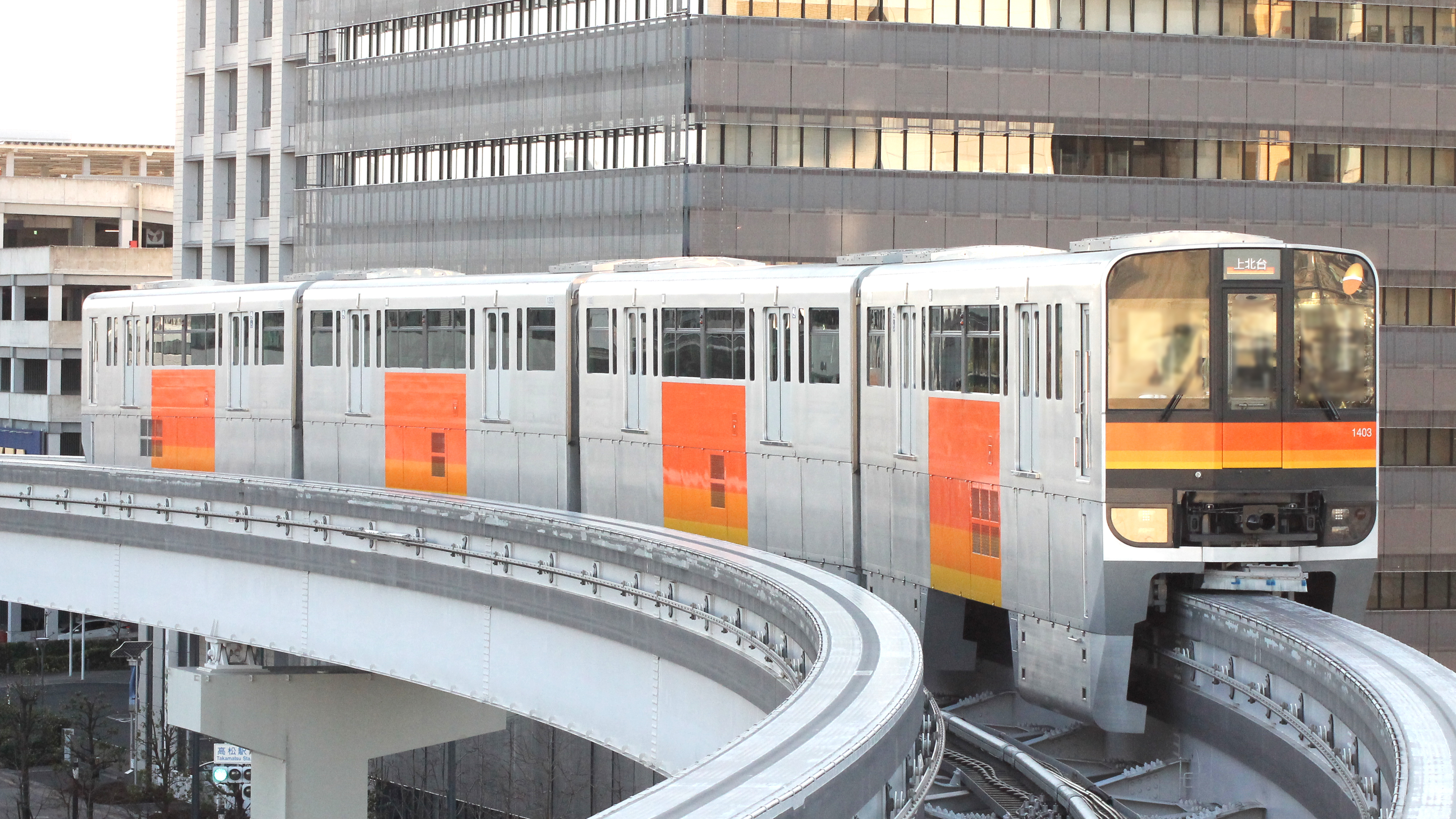
In 2016 it was mentioned that Line 3 would use trains with characteristics similar to those of the Tama Toshi Monorail Line.

In August 2018, Panama Metro signed a memorandum of understanding with Hitachi, its subsidiary Ansaldo STS (now Hitachi Rail STS), and Mitsubishi Corporation for the supply of 28 six-car monorail trains, valued at a total of $839,678,828, with these companies acting as designated subcontractors. Under this agreement, Hitachi and its subsidiary committed to supplying the yard and workshop equipment, the CBTC signaling and control system, telecommunications, control center, traction power system, turnouts, and automatic platform screen doors, while Mitsubishi was tasked with managing the commercial affairs.

The tender for the construction of Line 3 began in December 2016 and attracted 32 companies from various countries. After a process that extended until 2019, on November 18, 2019, the HPH Joint Venture Consortium was declared the winner. The consortium, formed by the South Korean companies Hyundai Engineering & Construction, Posco Engineering & Construction, and Hyundai Engineering, received the highest score and submitted an economic bid of 2,507.43 million dollars, which exceeded the base price. Construction was scheduled to take 54 months (approximately 4.5 years) and would be carried out in parallel with the Fourth Bridge over the Panama Canal, as Line 3 would use two exclusive lanes of it.

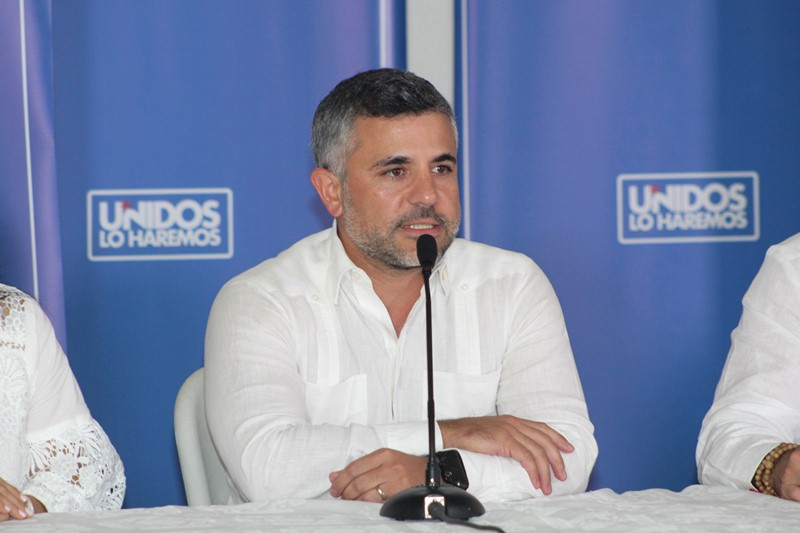
Rafael Sabonge, Minister of Public Works between 2019 and 2024.

However, in early 2020, it was decided that Line 3 would not use the Fourth Bridge. Rafael Sabonge, then Minister of Public Works (MOP), explained at the time that the bridge did not have a financing scheme similar to that of the Metro, and there was a risk of facing penalties for delays on Line 3 of up to 7 million dollars per month. For this reason, it was decided to separate both projects in order to reduce costs, avoid interferences, and optimize their respective schedules. As a consequence, it became necessary to redesign the alignment of Line 3, where approximately 6 km (3.7 mi) that were originally elevated,including the Balboa and Albrook stations, had to be converted into an underground section to pass under the Panama Canal, causing the project’s budget to increase exponentially.

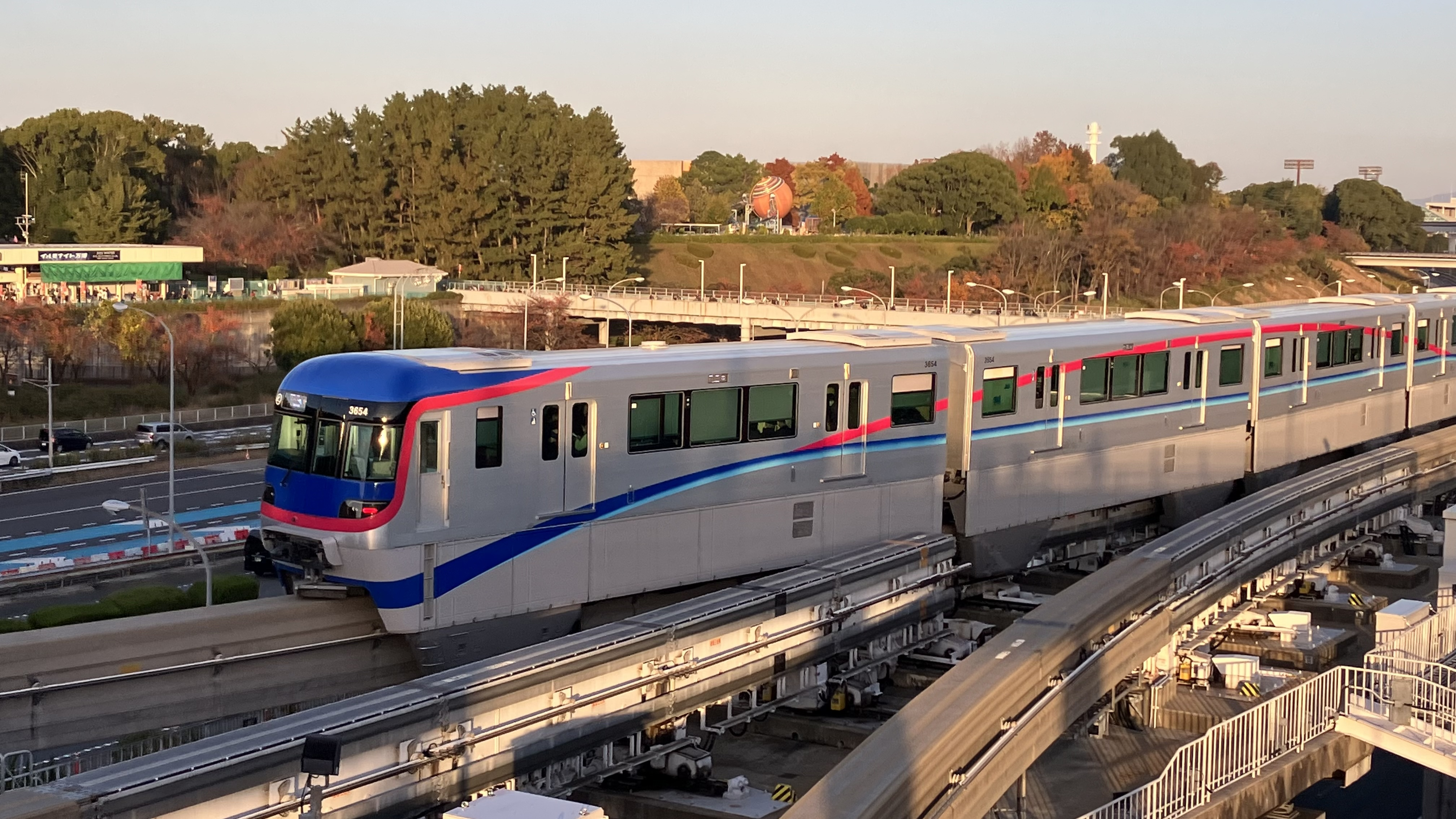
The Osaka Monorail 3000 series were used as the basis for the trains.

The main contract between the Panama Metro and the HPH Consortium was signed on Thursday, October 29, 2020. In the same ceremony, the contract was also signed with the nominated subcontractor, the Grupo de Empresas Sunrise Monorail, consisting of Hitachi, Hitachi Rail STS and Mitsubishi, responsible for supplying the rolling stock. Subsequently, on February 22, 2021, then President Laurentino Cortizo issued the notice to proceed to the HPH Consortium to begin construction. The consortium focused its efforts and the first years of construction on what is now known as Phase 1, corresponding to the Remaining Original Section of 19 kilometers (12 mi) of elevated viaduct between Ciudad del Futuro and Panamá Pacífico, while the tunnel design was being tendered. However, by April 2022, the tunnel’s design and construction were integrated into the HPH Consortium’s main contract.

== Station list ==
Station	Date opened	Level	Distance (km)		Connection	Location	
Station	Date opened	Level	Between stations	Total	Connection	Location	
Ciudad del Futuro	2027 or 2028	Elevated, ground-level access	-	0.0	La Villa; La Villa 2 (at distance)	Juan Demóstenes Arosemena	Panamá Oeste Province
San Bernardino	2027 or 2028	Elevated, overground access	1.0	1.0	Super 99 Valle Hermoso	Juan Demóstenes Arosemena	Panamá Oeste Province
Nuevo Arraiján	2027 or 2028	Elevated, overground access	0.8	1.8	Nuevo Arraiján	Juan Demóstenes Arosemena	Panamá Oeste Province
Vista Alegre 2	Unknown	Elevated, overground access	1.2	3.0	El Rey Vista Alegre (at distance); Cochez Vista Alegre (at distance)	Vista Alegre	Panamá Oeste Province
Vista Alegre	2027 or 2028	Elevated, overground access	0.8	3.8	Super Xtra Vista Alegre (at distance)	Vista Alegre	Panamá Oeste Province
Cerro Silvestre	2027 or 2028	Elevated, overground access	2.0	5.8	Bique	Cerro Silvestre	Panamá Oeste Province
Nuevo Chorrillo	2027 or 2028	Elevated, overground access	1.6	7.4	Nuevo Chorrillo	Cerro Silvestre	Panamá Oeste Province
Burunga	2027 or 2028	Elevated, overground access	1.3	8.7	Burunga	Burunga	Panamá Oeste Province
Arraiján 2	Unknown	Elevated, overground access	1.0	9.7	La Hacienda (at distance)	Arraiján	Panamá Oeste Province
Arraiján	2027 or 2028	Elevated, overground access	1.0	10.7	Super Xtra Arraiján (under reconstruction); Puente de Arraiján (at distance)	Burunga/Arraiján	Panamá Oeste Province
Loma Cová	2027 or 2028	Elevated, overground access	2.0	12.7	Loma Cová	Arraiján	Panamá Oeste Province
Panamá Pacifico	2027 or 2028	Elevated, overground access	5.4	18.1	Panamá Pacífico; Panama-David-Frontera Railway (in planning)	Veracruz	Panamá Oeste Province
Balboa	Unknown	Underground, trench	4.3	22.4	Puerto de Balboa; Teatro Balboa (at distance)	Ancón	Panamá Province
Albrook	2028	Underground, grade-level access	2.0	24.4	Line 1 Metro Albrook; Gran Terminal Nacional de Transporte; Panama-David-Frontera Railway (in planning; at distance)	Ancón	Panamá Province

== Rolling stock ==
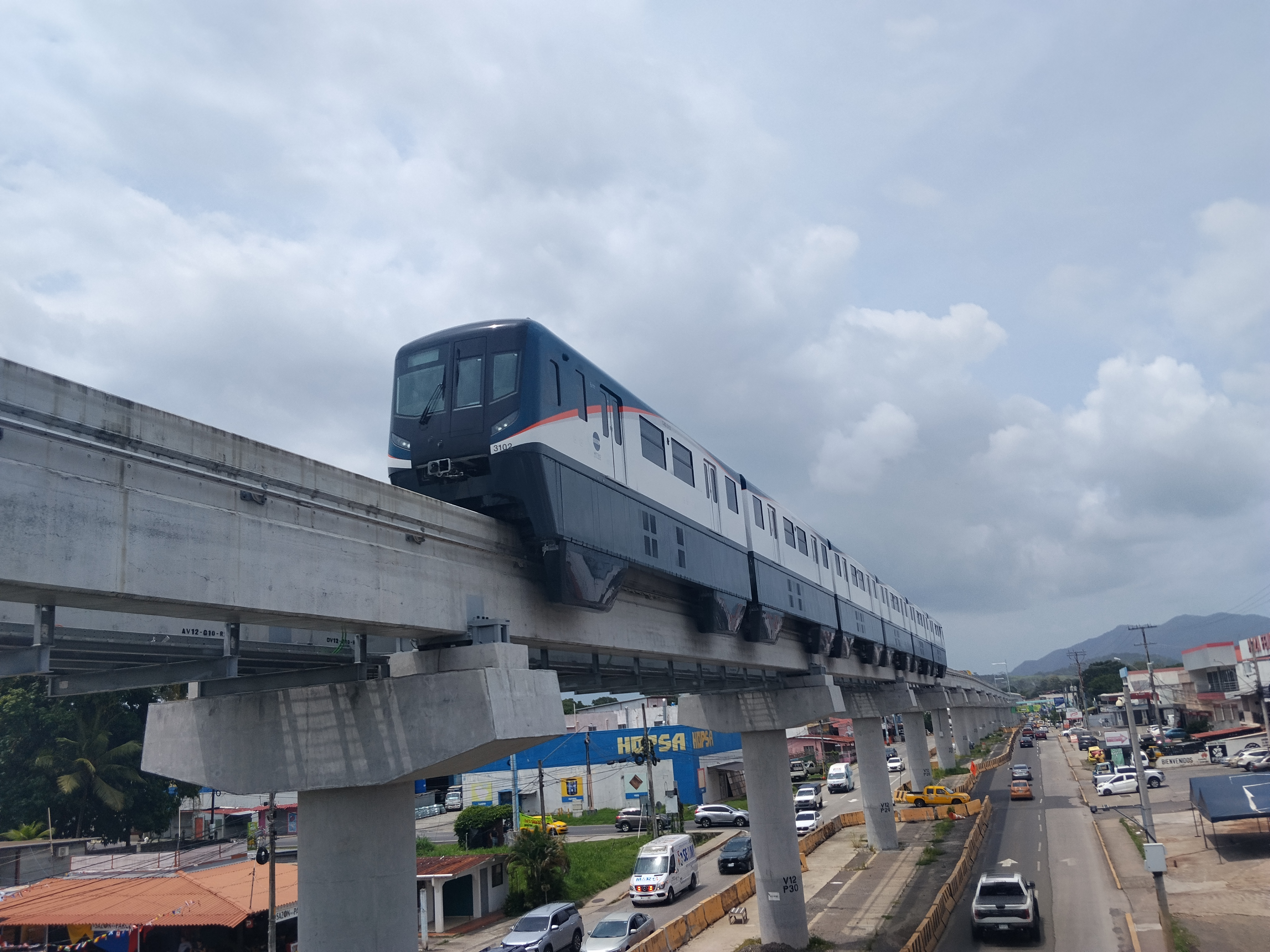
The Hitachi Monorail conducting its dynamic tests on the elevated viaduct of Nuevo Arraiján

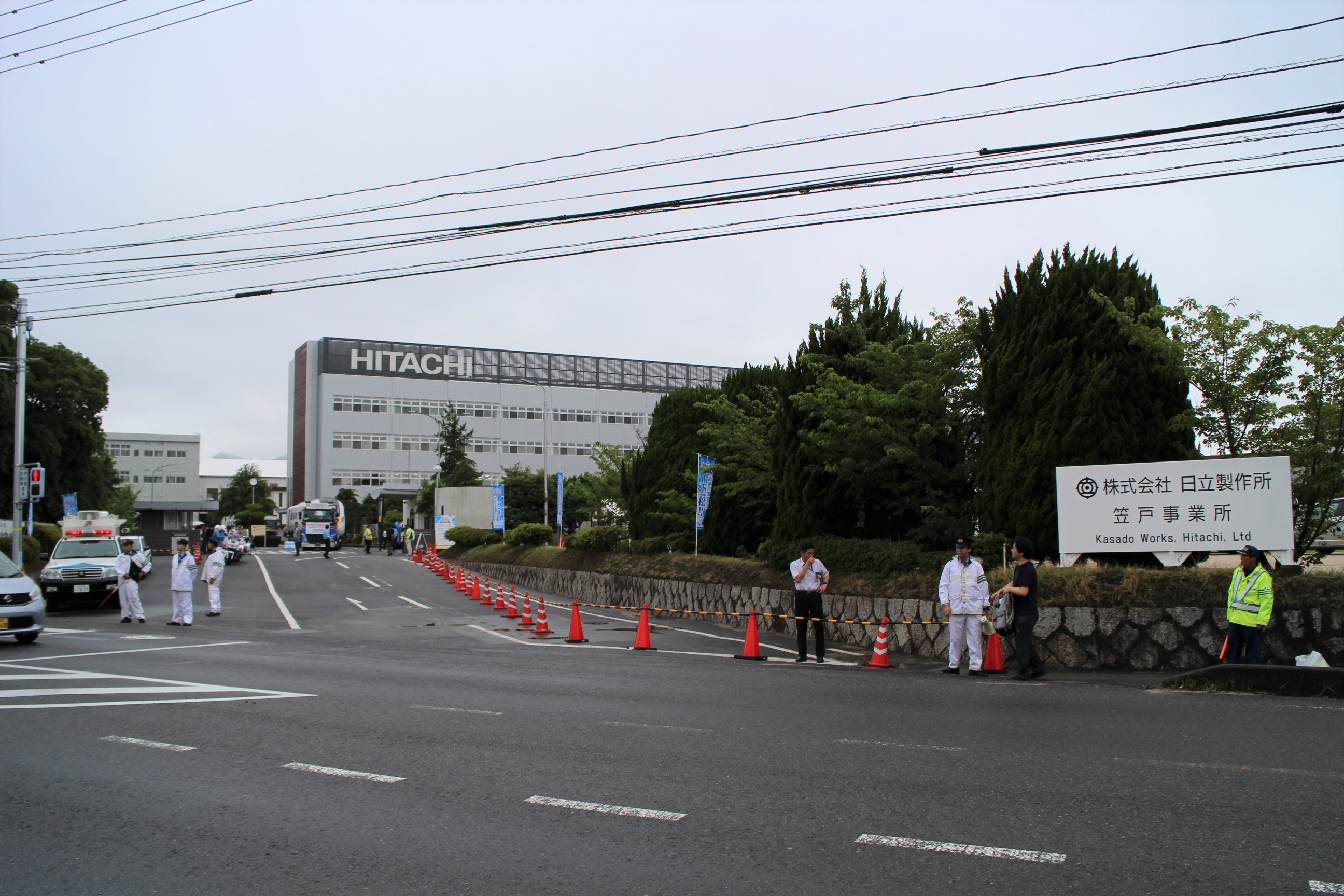
The entire fleet was manufactured at the Hitachi Kasado Works near Kudamatsu, Yamaguchi Prefecture.

Line 3 will be served by 26 six-car Hitachi Monorail trains supplied by Hitachi Rail as part of the Sunrise Monorail Group. These straddle-type monorail vehicles were manufactured at Hitachi’s Kasado factory in Japan, and are inspired by the design of the Osaka Monorail 3000 Series. Each train is approximate 89.4 meters long and have capacity of 1,000 passengers, 250 of whom can be seated, incorporating features such as Hitachi’s B-CHOP energy storage system for regenerative braking, a 4M2T motor configuration, a commercial speed of 80 km/h, and a high-capacity braking system. The medium-gauge cars are 2.9 meters wide and between 14.6 and 15.5 meters long, allowing for free movement of passengers between cars and featuring two doors on each side. Its exterior design is characterized by a predominance of white, combined with dark blue accents, two subtle diagonal lines in orange and gray along the sides, and dark gray on the lower skirt.

The first trainsets arrived in Panama in early 2024, and the fleet was completed in July 2025. After assembly and static testing in Yards and Workshops, the dynamic testing with the full fleet began on April 13, 2026 between Ciudad del Futuro and San Bernardino, and will progressively extend to Panamá Pacífico as civil works on the elevated section are completed.
