= 2025 Little League World Series results =

Youth baseball tournament results

The results of the 2025 Little League World Series were determined between August 13 and August 24, 2025 in South Williamsport, Pennsylvania. Twenty teams were divided into two groups, one with ten teams from the United States and another with ten international teams, with both groups playing a modified double-elimination tournament. In each group, the last remaining undefeated team faced the last remaining team with one loss, with the winners of those games advancing to play for the Little League World Series championship.

Double-elimination
United States
United States	Winner's bracket								
United States	(Nevada) NV 16◄ (Illinois) IL 1 Linescore	(Connecticut) CT 1◄ (Texas) TX 0 Linescore	(Massachusetts) MA 0 (F/4) (South Carolina) SC 13◄ Linescore	(South Dakota) SD 2◄ (Pennsylvania) PA 0 Linescore	(Nevada) NV 5◄ (Washington (state)) WA 3 Linescore	(Connecticut) CT 5◄ (Hawaii) HI 1 Linescore	(South Carolina) SC 0 (F/7) (Nevada) NV 1◄ Linescore	(Connecticut) CT 13◄ (South Dakota) SD 1 Linescore	(Connecticut) CT 7◄ (Nevada) NV 3 Linescore
United States	Loser's bracket								
United States	(Texas) TX 3 (Massachusetts) MA 7◄ Linescore	(Pennsylvania) PA 2 (Illinois) IL 3◄ Linescore	(Massachusetts) MA 2 (Washington (state)) WA 3◄ Linescore	(Illinois) IL 1 (Hawaii) HI 9◄ Linescore	(South Carolina) SC 3◄ (Hawaii) HI 0 Linescore	(South Dakota) SD 9◄ (Washington (state)) WA 0 Linescore	(South Dakota) SD 6 (F/7) (South Carolina) SC 7◄ Linescore	(Nevada) NV 5◄ (South Carolina) SC 3 Linescore	
International
International	Winner's bracket								
International	(Puerto Rico) PRI 0 (Venezuela) VEN 5◄ Linescore	(Panama) PAN 7◄ (Australia) AUS 2 Linescore	(Czech Republic) CZE 0 (F/4) (Japan) JPN 12◄ Linescore	(Chinese Taipei) TPE 3◄ (Mexico) MEX 0 Linescore	(Canada) CAN 0 (Venezuela) VEN 4◄ Linescore	(Aruba) ARU 8◄ (Panama) PAN 2 Linescore	(Venezuela) VEN 4◄ (Japan) JPN 0 Linescore	(Chinese Taipei) TPE 4◄ (Aruba) ARU 0 Linescore	(Chinese Taipei) TPE 7◄ (Venezuela) VEN 3 Linescore
International	Loser's bracket								
International	(Czech Republic) CZE 3 (Australia) AUS 5◄ Linescore	(Mexico) MEX 11◄ (Puerto Rico) PRI 5 Linescore	(Canada) CAN 12◄ (Australia) AUS 0 (F/5); Linescore	(Panama) PAN 1 (Mexico) MEX 2◄ Linescore	(Japan) JPN 6◄ (Mexico) MEX 0 Linescore	(Canada) CAN 1 (Aruba) ARU 6◄ Linescore	(Japan) JPN 0 (Aruba) ARU 3◄ Linescore	(Aruba) ARU 3◄ (Venezuela) VEN 1 Linescore	
Single-elimination
International championship	Chinese Taipei 1◄ Aruba 0 Linescore								
United States championship	Nevada 8◄ Connecticut 2 Linescore								
Third place game	Connecticut 4◄ Aruba 2 Linescore								
World championship game	Nevada 0 Chinese Taipei 7◄ Linescore								

== Double-elimination stage ==
=== United States ===
Upper round 1	Upper round 2	Upper round 3	Upper final	Final
August 15 – Game 10
August 13 – Game 2	(Washington (state)) Washington	3
August 18 – Game 22 (F/7)
Nevada	16	Nevada	5
Nevada	1
Illinois	1	August 14 – Game 6 (F/4)
South Carolina	0
Massachusetts	0
August 20 – Game 30
South Carolina	13
Nevada	3
August 15 – Game 12
Connecticut	7
August 13 – Game 4	Hawaii	1
August 18 – Game 24
Connecticut	1	Connecticut	5
Connecticut	13
Texas	0	August 14 – Game 8
South Dakota	1
South Dakota	2	August 23 – U.S. Championship
Pennsylvania	0	Connecticut	2
Nevada	8
Lower round 1	Lower round 2	Lower round 3	Lower round 4	Lower final
August 19 – Game 28
August 17 – Game 17	South Dakota	9	August 21 – Game 34
August 16 – Game 14	Washington	3	Washington	0	August 20 – Game 32 (F/7)	Nevada	5
Texas	3	Massachusetts	2	South Dakota	6	South Carolina	3
Massachusetts	7	August 19 – Game 26	South Carolina	7
August 17 – Game 19	South Carolina	3
August 16 – Game 16	Hawaii	9	Hawaii	0
Pennsylvania	2	Illinois	1
Illinois	3

==== Winner's bracket ====
===== Game 2: Nevada 16, Illinois 1 =====
August 13 3:00 pm EDT Howard J. Lamade Stadium
Team	1	2	3	4	5	6	R	H	E
Nevada ◄	1	4	0	0	0	11	16	18	1
Illinois	0	0	0	0	0	1	1	5	1
WP: Garrett Gallegos (1–0) LP: Luke Schaller (0–1); Boxscore

===== Game 4: Connecticut 1, Texas 0 =====
August 13 7:00 pm EDT Howard J. Lamade Stadium
Team	1	2	3	4	5	6	R	H	E
Connecticut ◄	0	0	0	0	1	0	1	3	0
Texas	0	0	0	0	0	0	0	1	1
WP: Luca Pellegrini (1–0) LP: Shane Grawe (0–1); Boxscore

===== Game 6: South Carolina 13, Massachusetts 0 =====
August 14 3:00 pm EDT Howard J. Lamade Stadium
Team	1	2	3	4	5	6	R	H	E
Massachusetts	0	0	0	0	–	–	0	1	1
South Carolina ◄	2	6	5	X	–	–	13	8	0
WP: Joe Giulietti (1–0) LP: Colman Gouthro (0–1); Home runs: MA: None; SC: Joe Giulietti (1); Notes: Completed early due to the run rule. Boxscore

===== Game 8: South Dakota 2, Pennsylvania 0 =====
August 14 7:00 pm EDT Howard J. Lamade Stadium
Team	1	2	3	4	5	6	R	H	E
South Dakota ◄	2	0	0	0	0	0	2	9	0
Pennsylvania	0	0	0	0	0	0	0	1	0
WP: Maxen Snoozy (1–0) LP: Aiden Mercer (0–1); Boxscore

===== Game 10: Nevada 5, Washington 3 =====
August 15 3:00 pm EDT Howard J. Lamade Stadium
Team	1	2	3	4	5	6	R	H	E
Nevada ◄	2	0	0	0	0	3	5	9	0
Washington	0	0	0	0	1	2	3	7	4
WP: Ethan Robertson (1–0) complete game 89 pitches LP: Gavin Heacox (0–1); Home runs: NV: Cache Malan (1); WA: None; Boxscore

===== Game 12: Connecticut 5, Hawaii 1 =====
August 15 7:00 pm EDT Howard J. Lamade Stadium
Team	1	2	3	4	5	6	R	H	E
Connecticut ◄	0	0	0	0	5	0	5	4	0
Hawaii	0	0	1	0	0	0	1	5	1
WP: Tommy D'Amura (1–0) LP: Mason Mitani (0–1); Boxscore

===== Game 22: Nevada 1, South Carolina 0 =====
August 18 3:00 pm EDT Howard J. Lamade Stadium
Team	1	2	3	4	5	6	7	R	H	E
South Carolina	0	0	0	0	0	0	0	0	5	1
Nevada ◄	0	0	0	0	0	0	1	1	2	1
WP: Luke D'Ambrosio (1–0) LP: Brady Westbrooks (0–1); Boxscore

===== Game 24: Connecticut 13, South Dakota 1 =====
August 18 7:00 pm EDT Howard J. Lamade Stadium
Team	1	2	3	4	5	6	R	H	E
Connecticut ◄	0	0	0	2	1	10	13	13	1
South Dakota	1	0	0	0	0	0	1	2	0
WP: Luca Pellegrini (2–0) LP: Murphy Seefeldt (0–1); Boxscore

===== Game 30: Connecticut 7, Nevada 3 =====
August 20 3:00 pm EDT Howard J. Lamade Stadium
Team	1	2	3	4	5	6	R	H	E
Connecticut ◄	0	0	3	0	1	3	7	12	0
Nevada	3	0	0	0	0	0	3	7	2
WP: SJ Taxiltaridis (1–0) LP: Grayson Miranda (0–1); Home runs: CT: Tommy D'Amura (1); NV: Cache Malan (2); Boxscore

==== Loser's bracket ====
===== Game 14: Massachusetts 7, Texas 3 =====
August 16 3:00 pm EDT Howard J. Lamade Stadium
Team	1	2	3	4	5	6	R	H	E
Texas	2	0	0	0	1	0	3	9	4
Massachusetts ◄	3	2	2	0	0	X	7	7	1
WP: Frankie Fasoli III (1–0) LP: Brayden Carlisle (0–1); Notes: Texas is eliminated. Boxscore

===== Game 16: Illinois 3, Pennsylvania 2 =====
August 16 7:00 pm EDT Howard J. Lamade Stadium
Team	1	2	3	4	5	6	R	H	E
Pennsylvania	0	0	0	2	0	0	2	6	0
Illinois ◄	0	0	3	0	0	X	3	6	0
WP: Brody Herold (1–0) LP: Frankie Kolter (0–1); Notes: Pennsylvania is eliminated. Boxscore

===== Game 17: Washington 3, Massachusetts 2 =====
August 17 9:00 am EDT Howard J. Lamade Stadium
Team	1	2	3	4	5	6	R	H	E
Massachusetts	0	2	0	0	0	0	2	3	2
Washington ◄	1	2	0	0	0	X	3	6	3
WP: Sawyer Breed (1–0) LP: Henry Kuka (0–1); Notes: Massachusetts is eliminated. Boxscore

===== Game 19: Hawaii 9, Illinois 1 =====
August 17 1:00 pm EDT Howard J. Lamade Stadium
Team	1	2	3	4	5	6	R	H	E
Illinois	0	0	0	1	0	0	1	5	1
Hawaii ◄	5	3	1	0	0	X	9	15	0
WP: Evan Crawford (1–0) LP: Jack Kaczmarski (0–1); Home runs: IL: None; HI: Bronson Fermahin (1); Notes: Illinois is eliminated. Boxscore

===== Game 26: South Carolina 3, Hawaii 0 =====
August 19 3:00 pm EDT Howard J. Lamade Stadium
Team	1	2	3	4	5	6	R	H	E
South Carolina ◄	0	1	0	0	0	2	3	6	1
Hawaii	0	0	0	0	0	0	0	4	0
WP: Brady Westbrooks (1–1) LP: Bronson Fermahin (0–1); Notes: Hawaii is eliminated. Boxscore

===== Game 28: South Dakota 9, Washington 0 =====
August 19 7:00 pm EDT Howard J. Lamade Stadium
Team	1	2	3	4	5	6	R	H	E
South Dakota ◄	0	1	0	0	0	8	9	7	0
Washington	0	0	0	0	0	0	0	4	2
WP: Maxen Snoozy (2–0) LP: Andrew Madsen (0–1); Notes: Washington is eliminated. Boxscore

===== Game 32: South Carolina 7, South Dakota 6 =====
August 20 7:00 pm EDT Howard J. Lamade Stadium
Team	1	2	3	4	5	6	7	R	H	E
South Dakota	0	1	0	0	0	0	5	6	7	0
South Carolina ◄	0	0	0	0	0	1	6	7	7	2
WP: Palmer Steele (1–0) LP: Devin Aukes (0–1); Notes: South Dakota is eliminated. Boxscore

===== Game 34: Nevada 5, South Carolina 3 =====
August 21 7:00 pm EDT Howard J. Lamade Stadium
Team	1	2	3	4	5	6	R	H	E
Nevada ◄	1	0	1	0	0	3	5	7	0
South Carolina	0	1	0	1	1	0	3	6	0
WP: Luke D'Ambrosio (2–0) LP: Palmer Steele (1–1); Home runs: NV: Garrett Gallegos (1); SC: Brody Miller (1), Joe Giulietti (2); Notes: South Carolina is eliminated. Boxscore

=== International ===
Upper round 1	Upper round 2	Upper round 3	Upper final	Final
August 15 – Game 9
August 13 – Game 1	Canada	0
August 18 – Game 21
Puerto Rico	0	Venezuela	4
Venezuela	4
Venezuela	5	August 14 – Game 5 (F/4)
Japan	0
Czech Republic	0
August 20 – Game 29
Japan	12
Venezuela	3
August 15 – Game 11
Chinese Taipei	7
August 13 – Game 3	Aruba	8
August 18 – Game 23
Panama	7	Panama	2
Aruba	0
Australia	2	August 14 – Game 7
Chinese Taipei	4
Chinese Taipei	3	August 23 – Int'l Championship
Mexico	0	Chinese Taipei	1
Aruba	0
Lower round 1	Lower round 2	Lower round 3	Lower round 4	Lower final
August 19 – Game 27
August 17 – Game 18 (F/5)	Aruba	6	August 21 – Game 33
August 16 – Game 13	Canada	12	Canada	1	August 20 – Game 31	Venezuela	1
Australia	5	Australia	0	Aruba	3	Aruba	3
Czech Republic	3	August 19 – Game 25	Japan	0
August 17 – Game 20	Japan	6
August 16 – Game 15	Panama	1	Mexico	0
Mexico	11	Mexico	2
Puerto Rico	5

==== Winner's bracket ====
===== Game 1: Venezuela 5, Puerto Rico 0 =====
August 13 1:00 pm EDT Volunteer Stadium
Team	1	2	3	4	5	6	R	H	E
Puerto Rico	0	0	0	0	0	0	0	3	1
Venezuela ◄	0	3	0	0	2	X	5	5	1
WP: Juan Reyes (1–0) LP: Sebastian Colon Rivera (0–1); Boxscore

===== Game 3: Panama 7, Australia 2 =====
August 13 5:00 pm EDT Volunteer Stadium
Team	1	2	3	4	5	6	R	H	E
Panama ◄	2	0	0	5	0	0	7	5	2
Australia	1	0	0	0	1	0	2	4	6
WP: Alvis Arauz (1–0) LP: Braxton Black (0–1); Home runs: PAN: Anthoni Castillo (1); AUS: None; Boxscore

===== Game 5: Japan 12, Czech Republic 0 =====
August 14 1:00 pm EDT Volunteer Stadium
Team	1	2	3	4	5	6	R	H	E
Czech Republic	0	0	0	0	–	–	0	0	0
Japan ◄	2	9	1	X	–	–	12	11	0
WP: Kensei Takeuchi (1–0) LP: Serafym Ustinov (0–1); Notes: Completed early due to the run rule. Boxscore

===== Game 7: Chinese Taipei 3, Mexico 0 =====
August 14 5:00 pm EDT Volunteer Stadium
Team	1	2	3	4	5	6	R	H	E
Chinese Taipei ◄	1	1	1	0	0	0	3	8	1
Mexico	0	0	0	0	0	0	0	3	1
WP: Lin Chin-Tse (1–0) LP: Gregorio Madrid (0–1); Home runs: TPE: Lin Chin-Tse (1); MEX: None; Boxscore

===== Game 9: Venezuela 4, Canada 0 =====
August 15 1:00 pm EDT Volunteer Stadium
Team	1	2	3	4	5	6	R	H	E
Canada	0	0	0	0	0	0	0	1	0
Venezuela ◄	1	3	0	0	0	X	4	6	1
WP: Andres Reyes Querales (1–0) LP: Felix Hoyano (0–1); Boxscore

===== Game 11: Aruba 8, Panama 2 =====
August 15 5:00 pm EDT Volunteer Stadium
Team	1	2	3	4	5	6	R	H	E
Aruba ◄	0	1	0	3	0	4	8	8	0
Panama	0	0	0	0	1	1	2	4	3
WP: Arnold Gismar Martha (1–0) LP: Angel Bonilla (0–1); Boxscore

===== Game 21: Venezuela 4, Japan 0 =====
August 18 1:00 pm EDT Volunteer Stadium
Team	1	2	3	4	5	6	R	H	E
Venezuela ◄	2	0	2	0	0	0	4	7	0
Japan	0	0	0	0	0	0	0	3	1
WP: Juan Reyes (2–0) LP: Tensei Yazawa (0–1); Boxscore

===== Game 23: Chinese Taipei 4, Aruba 0 =====
August 18 5:00 pm EDT Volunteer Stadium
Team	1	2	3	4	5	6	R	H	E
Chinese Taipei ◄	1	1	0	2	0	0	4	4	0
Aruba	0	0	0	0	0	0	0	3	0
WP: Liu Wei-Heng (1–0) LP: Jayderick Wederfoor (0–1); Boxscore

===== Game 29: Chinese Taipei 7, Venezuela 3 =====
August 20 1:00 pm EDT Volunteer Stadium
Team	1	2	3	4	5	6	R	H	E
Chinese Taipei ◄	2	0	0	1	4	0	7	8	1
Venezuela	0	0	0	0	3	0	3	5	0
WP: Lin Chin-Tse (2–0) LP: Andres Reyes Querales (1–1); Boxscore

==== Loser's bracket ====
===== Game 13: Australia 5, Czech Republic 3 =====
August 16 1:00 pm EDT Volunteer Stadium
Team	1	2	3	4	5	6	R	H	E
Czech Republic	0	1	0	0	1	1	3	1	1
Australia ◄	3	2	0	0	0	X	5	2	0
WP: Issei Hamano (1–0) LP: Mikulas Barta (0–1); Notes: Czech Republic is eliminated. Boxscore

===== Game 15: Mexico 11, Puerto Rico 5 =====
August 16 5:00 pm EDT Volunteer Stadium
Team	1	2	3	4	5	6	R	H	E
Mexico ◄	0	0	0	0	6	5	11	12	1
Puerto Rico	0	0	4	0	0	1	5	7	0
WP: Iker Castaneda (1–0) LP: Jeydrian J. Morales Sanchez (0–1); Home runs: MEX: Gregorio Madrid 2 (2), Iker Castaneda (1); PRI: Azariel Alvarado Medina (1), Sebastian Casanova Diaz (1); Notes: Puerto Rico is eliminated. Boxscore

===== Game 18: Canada 12, Australia 0 =====
August 17 11:00 am EDT Volunteer Stadium
Team	1	2	3	4	5	6	R	H	E
Canada ◄	0	1	2	1	8	−	12	13	0
Australia	0	0	0	0	0	−	0	1	1
WP: Tyson Grimsrud-Ronse (1−0) LP: Xander Reid (0−1); Notes: Completed early due to the run rule. Australia is eliminated. Boxscore

===== Game 20: Mexico 2, Panama 1 =====
August 17 2:00 pm EDT Volunteer Stadium
Team	1	2	3	4	5	6	R	H	E
Panama	0	0	0	0	0	1	1	3	4
Mexico ◄	1	0	0	0	0	1	2	5	3
WP: Gregorio Madrid (1–1) LP: Alvis Arauz (1–1); Notes: Panama is eliminated. Boxscore

===== Game 25: Japan 6, Mexico 0 =====
August 19 1:00 pm EDT Volunteer Stadium
Team	1	2	3	4	5	6	R	H	E
Japan ◄	4	0	0	0	2	0	6	10	0
Mexico	0	0	0	0	0	0	0	4	2
WP: Yushi Yamamoto (1–0) LP: Iker Castaneda (1–1); Home runs: JPN: Yushi Yamamoto (1), Tensei Yazawa (1); MEX: None; Notes: Mexico is eliminated. Boxscore

===== Game 27: Aruba 6, Canada 1 =====
August 19 5:00 pm EDT Volunteer Stadium
Team	1	2	3	4	5	6	R	H	E
Canada	1	0	0	0	0	0	1	4	2
Aruba ◄	2	0	2	1	1	X	6	7	0
WP: Anthony Santos (1–0) LP: Felix Hoyano (0–2); Home runs: CAN: None; ARU: Anthony Santos (1); Notes: Canada is eliminated. Boxscore

===== Game 31: Aruba 3, Japan 0 =====
August 20 5:00 pm EDT Volunteer Stadium
Team	1	2	3	4	5	6	R	H	E
Japan	0	0	0	0	0	0	0	3	1
Aruba ◄	0	0	0	0	3	X	3	4	3
WP: Jeter Filiciana (1–0) LP: Kensei Takeuchi (1–1); Home runs: JPN: None; ARU: Diliano Raven (1), Emerson Mercado (1); Notes: Japan is eliminated. Boxscore

===== Game 33: Aruba 3, Venezuela 1 =====
August 21 3:00 pm EDT Howard J. Lamade Stadium
Team	1	2	3	4	5	6	R	H	E
Aruba ◄	1	0	1	0	0	1	3	7	2
Venezuela	0	0	0	0	0	1	1	5	2
WP: Jay-Sell Girón (1–0) LP: Francisco Rivero (0–1) Sv: Emerson Mercado (1); Notes: Venezuela is eliminated. Boxscore

== Single-elimination stage ==
=== International championship: Chinese Taipei 1, Aruba 0 ===
August 23 12:30 pm EDT Howard J. Lamade Stadium
Team	1	2	3	4	5	6	R	H	E
Chinese Taipei ◄	0	0	1	0	0	0	1	3	0
Aruba	0	0	0	0	0	0	0	4	1
WP: Liu Wei-Heng (2–0) LP: Jayderick Wederfoor (0–2) Sv: Chen Qi-Sheng (1); Notes: Aruba is eliminated. Boxscore

=== United States championship: Nevada 8, Connecticut 2 ===
August 23 3:30 pm EDT Howard J. Lamade Stadium
Team	1	2	3	4	5	6	R	H	E
Nevada ◄	3	0	0	1	0	4	8	9	1
Connecticut	1	0	0	1	0	0	2	5	0
WP: Garrett Gallegos (2–0) LP: Luca Pellegrini (2–1); Home runs: NV: Garrett Gallegos (2); CT: None; Notes: Connecticut is eliminated. Boxscore

=== Third place game: Connecticut 4, Aruba 2 ===
August 24 10:00 am EDT Howard J. Lamade Stadium
Team	1	2	3	4	5	6	R	H	E
Connecticut ◄	0	0	3	0	0	1	4	6	0
Aruba	0	0	2	0	0	0	2	5	1
WP: Brian Palazzolo (1–0) LP: Anthony Santos (1–1) Sv: Tommy D'Amura (1); Boxscore

=== World championship game: Chinese Taipei 7, Nevada 0 ===
August 24 3:00 pm EDT Howard J. Lamade Stadium
Team	1	2	3	4	5	6	R	H	E
Nevada	0	0	0	0	0	0	0	3	2
Chinese Taipei ◄	0	1	1	0	5	X	7	6	0
WP: Lin Chin-Tse (3–0) LP: Luke D'Ambrosio (2–1); Notes: Chinese Taipei wins the Little League World Series. Boxscore
