= Lotería metro station =

Panama metro station

Estación Lotería
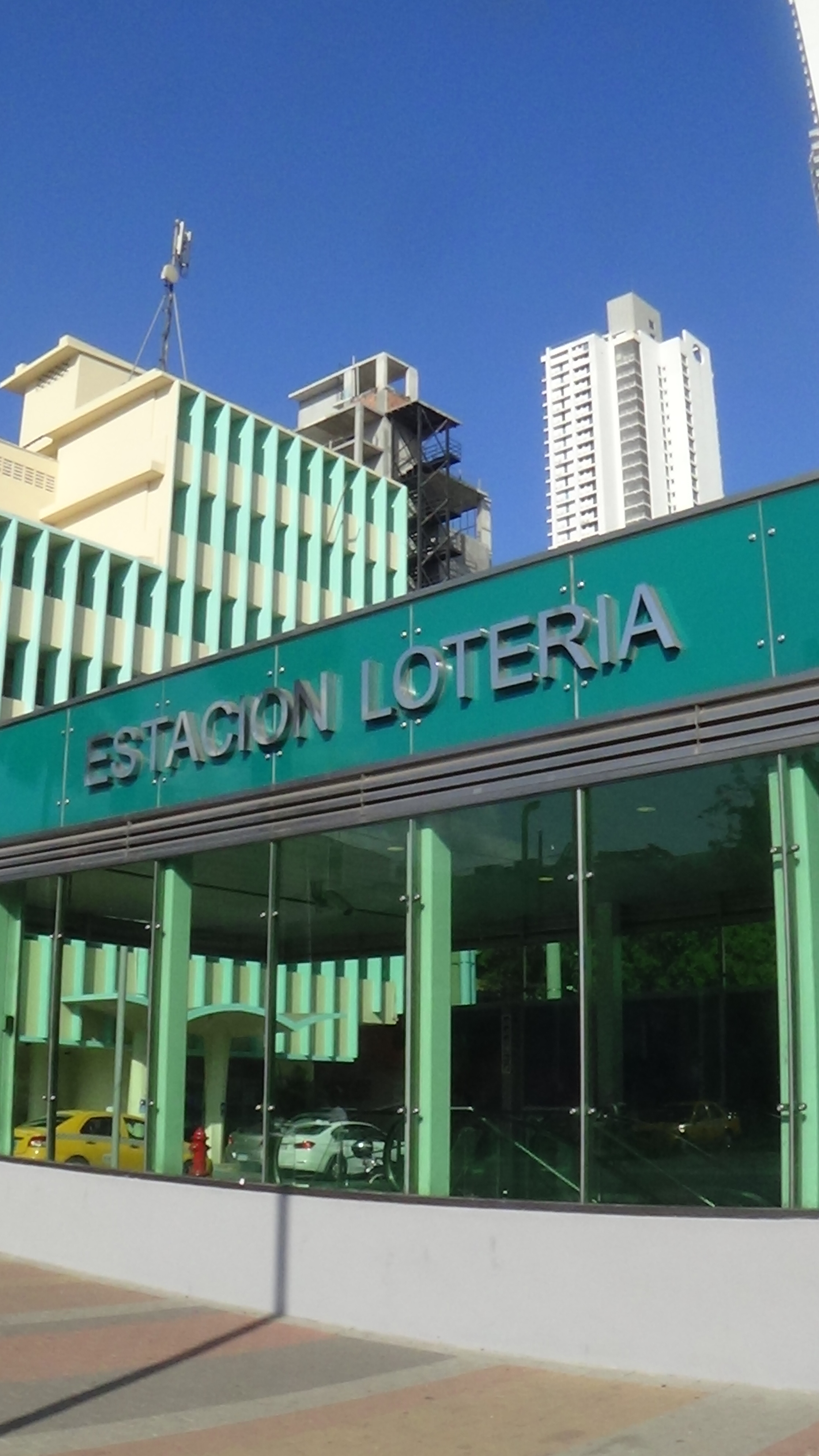
- Lotería metro station

General information
- Location: Avenida Justo Arosemena; Calidonia, Panamá District; Panama City; Panama
- Coordinates: 8°58′02.9″N 79°32′09.1″W
- System: Panama Metro station
- Platforms: 2

History
- Opened: 27 August 2014; 11 years ago

Services
Preceding station	Panama Metro	Following station
5 de Mayo toward Albrook	Line 1	Santo Tomás toward Villa Zaita
Location

Lotería is a Panama Metro station on Line 1. The station was not in the original metro plans and was the twelfth station to be opened. The official opening was carried out by President of Panama Juan Carlos Varela on 27 August 2014, four months after the network had opened. The station was originally to be called Marañón after a nearby district, but, in February 2012, was renamed to reflect its proximity to the offices of Panama's national lottery.

In its first year of operations, Lotería was the ninth most used station of the twelve on the network at that time, used by 8% of the network's passengers.
