= Nuevo Arraiján =

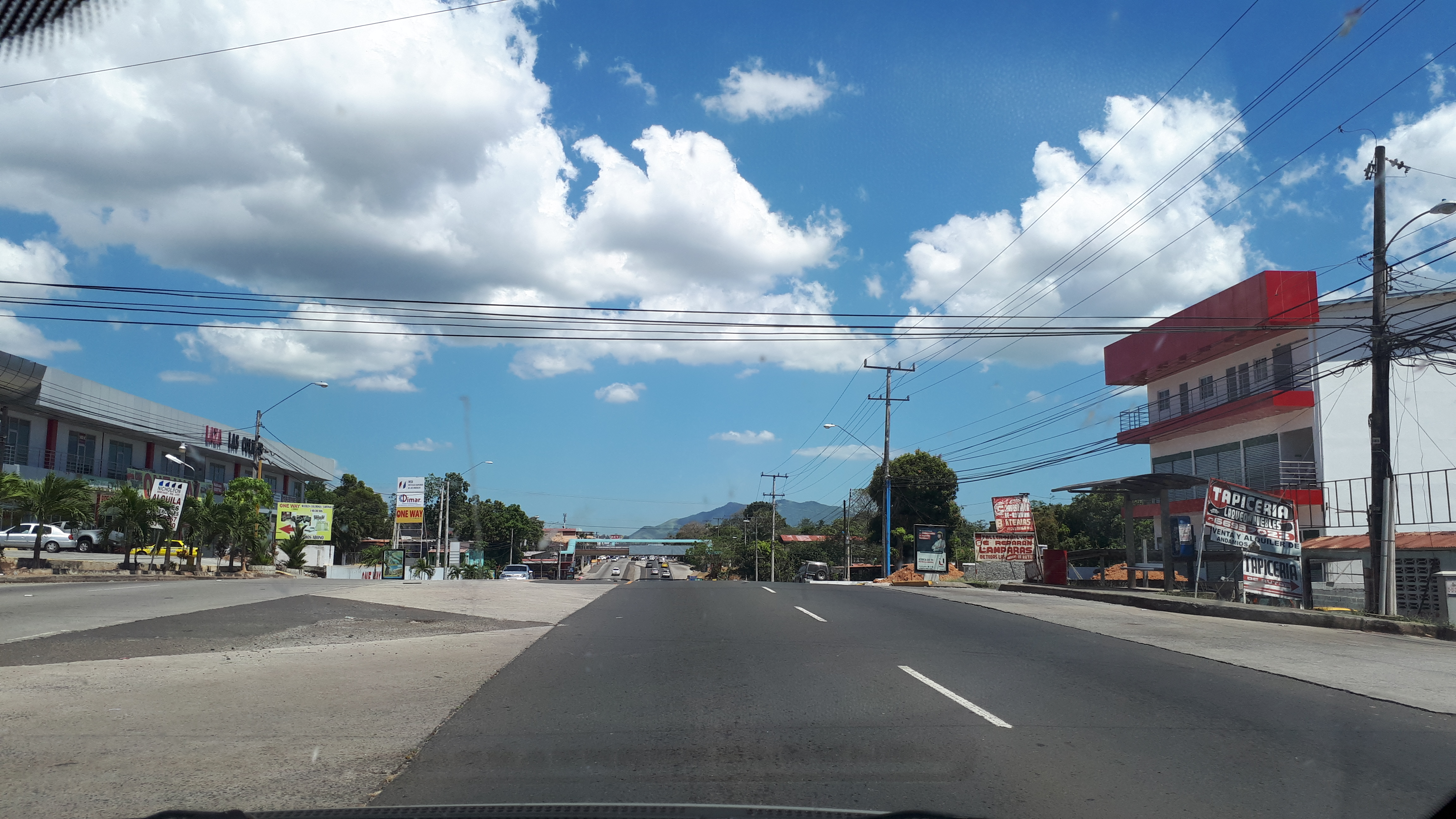

- Location within Panama
- Coordinates: 8°55′12″N 79°43′12″W
- Country: Arraijan
- Province: Panamá Oeste

Population (2008)
  - Total: 26 298

Nuevo Arraiján is a town in Arraiján District in the Panamá Oeste Province of Panama.
