= Osaka Monorail 3000 series =

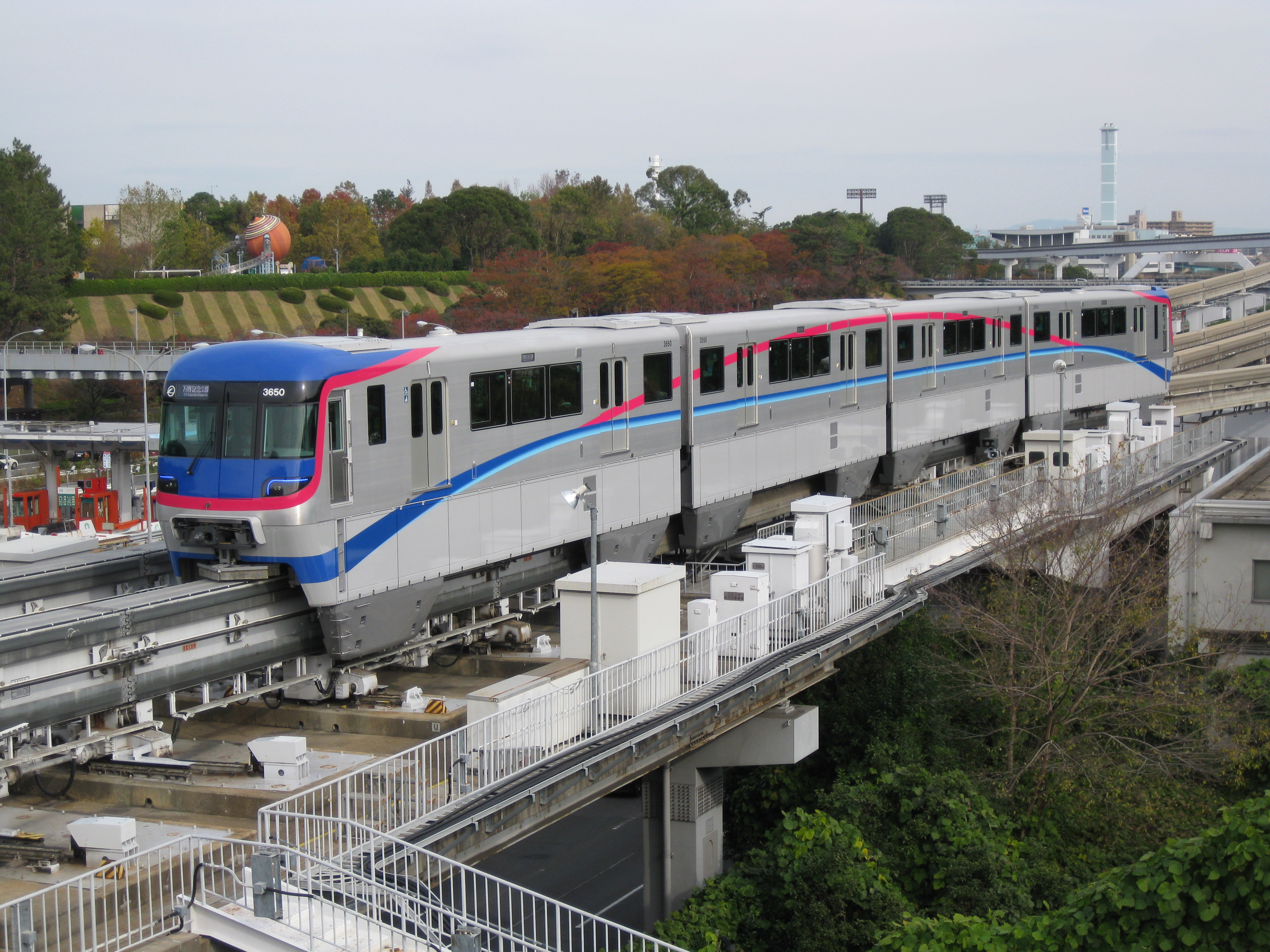
- Series 3000 trainset
- In service: 2018-present
- Manufacturer: Hitachi Rail
- Built at: Kasado Works, Kudamatsu, Yamaguchi
- Family name: Hitachi Monorail
- Replaced: 1000 series
- Entered service: 21 October 2018
- Number under construction: 32 vehicles (8 sets) on order
- Number built: 4 vehicles (1 set)
- Number in service: 4 vehicles
- Formation: 4-car sets (Mc1-M2-M1-Tc2)
- Capacity: 400
- Operators: Osaka Monorail

Specifications
- Car body construction: Aluminum alloy
- Train length: 60.2 m (197 ft 6 in)
- Car length: 15.5 m (50 ft 10 in) (end cars); 14.6 m (47 ft 11 in) (intermediate cars)
- Width: 2.98 m (9 ft 9 in)
- Height: 5.19 m (17 ft 0 in)
- Floor height: 1.13 m (3 ft 8 in)
- Doors: 2 pairs per side
- Wheel diameter: 1,006 mm (39.6 in)
- Wheelbase: 1,500 mm (4 ft 11 in)
- Maximum speed: 75 km/h (47 mph)
- Weight: 28.1 t (27.7 long tons; 31.0 short tons) (Mc1); 27 t (27 long tons; 30 short tons) (M); 26.7 t (26.3 long tons; 29.4 short tons) (Tc2)
- Traction system: Hitachi VFI-HR2415L 2-level IGBT–VVVF
- Traction motors: 12 × Hitachi EFO-K60 105 kW (141 hp) asynchronous 3-phase AC
- Power output: 1,260 kW (1,690 hp)
- Transmission: 6.55 : 1 gear ratio (2-stage reduction)
- Acceleration: 3 km/(h⋅s) (1.9 mph/s)
- Deceleration: 4 km/(h⋅s) (2.5 mph/s) (service); 4.5 km/(h⋅s) (2.8 mph/s) (emergency)
- Electric system(s): 1,500 V DC
- UIC classification: Bo′Bo′+Bo′Bo′+Bo′Bo′+2′2′
- Braking system(s): Regenerative and electro-pneumatic
- Safety system(s): ATC
- Coupling system: Shibata rotary

Notes/references
- Sourced from except where noted.

The 3000 series (3000系) is a type of monorail train manufactured by Hitachi Rail operated on the Osaka Monorail since 2018.

== Interior ==
The interior was designed with comfort and openness in mind, such as larger windows. At the rear of the lead car is a "Kids Zone" for children to play.
