= Nuevo Emperador =

- Town and corregimiento
- Location within Panama
- Coordinates: 9°0′0″N 79°43′48″W
- Country: Panama
- Province: Panamá Oeste
- District: Arraiján

Area
  - Land: 107.6 km^{2} (41.5 sq mi)

Population (2023)
  - Total: 10,414
  - Density: 96.78/km^{2} (250.7/sq mi)
- Population density calculated based on land area.
- Time zone: UTC−5 (EST)

Nuevo Emperador is a town and corregimiento in Arraiján District, Panamá Oeste Province, Panama. Its population is 10,414 (2023).
