= 5 de Mayo metro station =

Panama metro station

Estación Cinco de Mayo
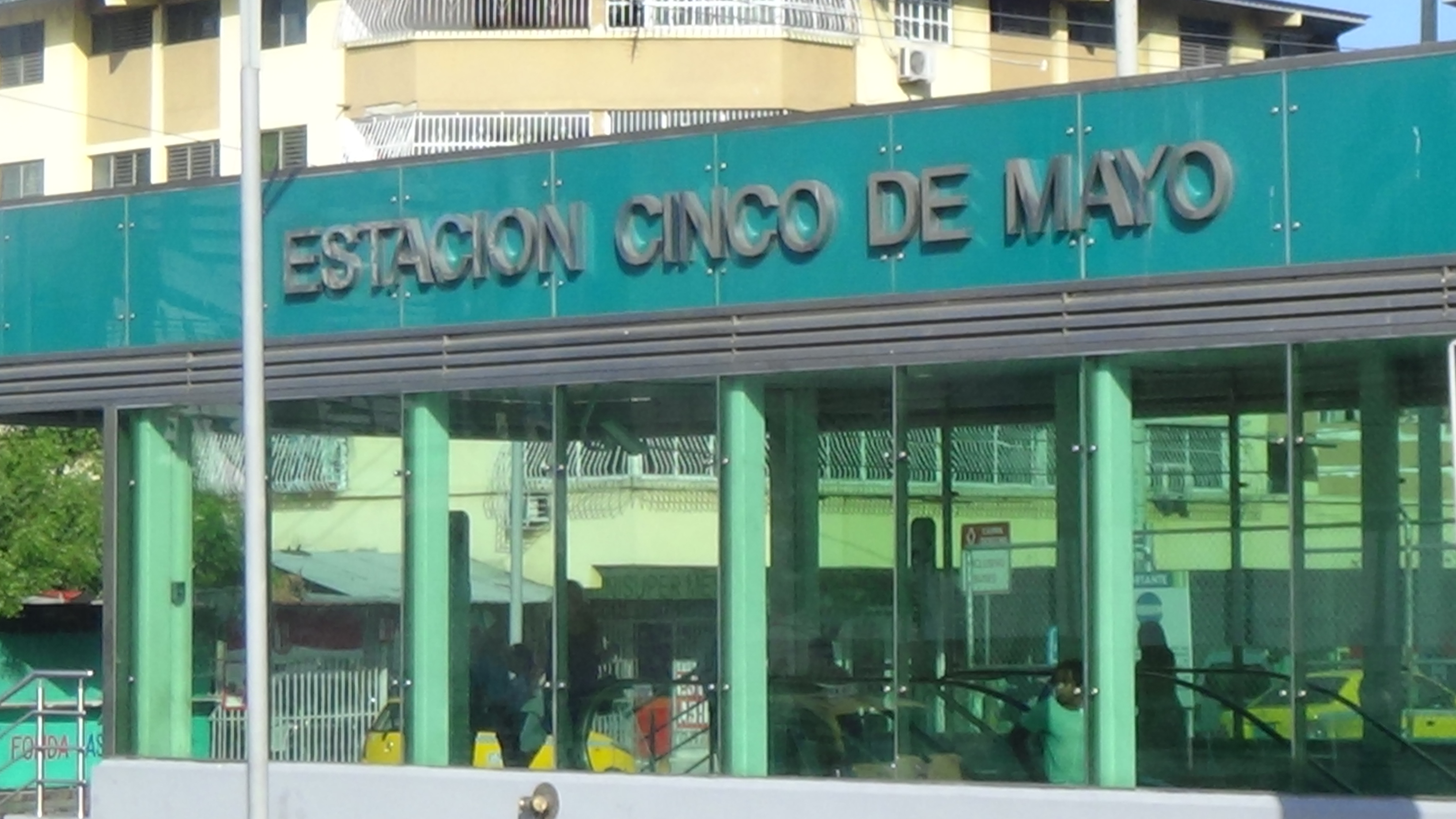
- 5 de Mayo station

General information
- Location: Avenida Justo Arosemena; Calidonia, Panamá District; Panama City; Panama
- Coordinates: 8°57′43.4″N 79°32′24.3″W
- System: Panama Metro station
- Platforms: 2

History
- Opened: 5 April 2014; 12 years ago

Services
Preceding station	Panama Metro	Following station
Albrook Terminus	Line 1	Lotería toward Villa Zaita
Location

5 de Mayo is a Panama Metro station on Line 1. It was one of the metro network's first 11 stations, opened on 5 April 2014 and commencing operations the following day.

The station is the closest to Panama City's Old Town. It is also located closest to the Metropolitan cathedral, Cinta Costera and Oceanographic museum. In its first year of operations, 5 de Mayo was the second most used station on the network, carrying 16% of the system's users at peak times.
