= Santa Clara, Panamá Oeste =

Santa Clara
- Town and corregimiento
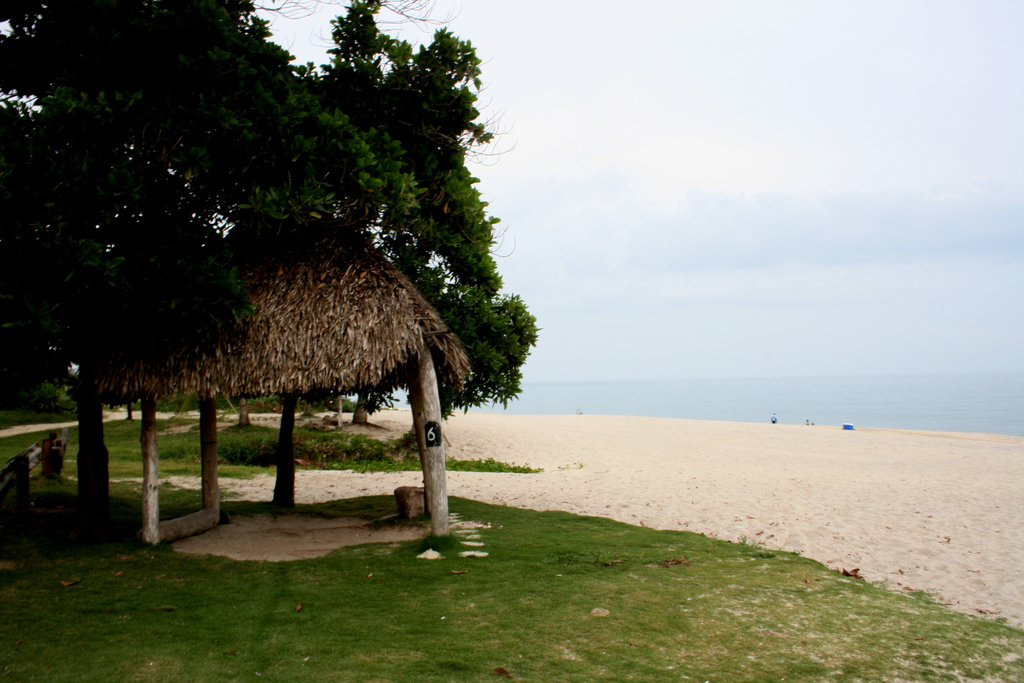

- Location within Panama
- Coordinates: 9.040°N 79.752°W
- Country: Panama
- Province: Panamá Oeste
- District: Arraiján

Area
  - Land: 52.8 km^{2} (20.4 sq mi)

Population (2010)
  - Total: 2,139
  - Density: 40.5/km^{2} (105/sq mi)
- Population density calculated based on land area.
- Time zone: UTC−5 (EST)

Santa Clara is a town and corregimiento in Arraiján District, Panamá Oeste Province, Panama, with a population of 2,139 as of 2010. Its population as of 1990 was 1,422; its population as of 2000 was 1,744.
