= Cerro Silvestre =

Coordinates: 8.9517°N 79.7008°W

- Corregimiento
- Location within Panama
- Country: Panama
- Province: Panamá Oeste
- District: Arraiján
- Established: April 30, 2003

Area
  - Land: 19.3 km^{2} (7.5 sq mi)

Population (2010)
  - Total: 23,592
  - Density: 1,225.1/km^{2} (3,173/sq mi)
- Population density calculated based on land area.
- Time zone: UTC−5 (EST)

Cerro Silvestre is a corregimiento in Arraiján District, Panamá Oeste Province, Panama with a population of 23,592 as of 2010. It was created by Law 42 of April 30, 2003.
