= Albrook metro station =

Panama metro station

Estación Albrook
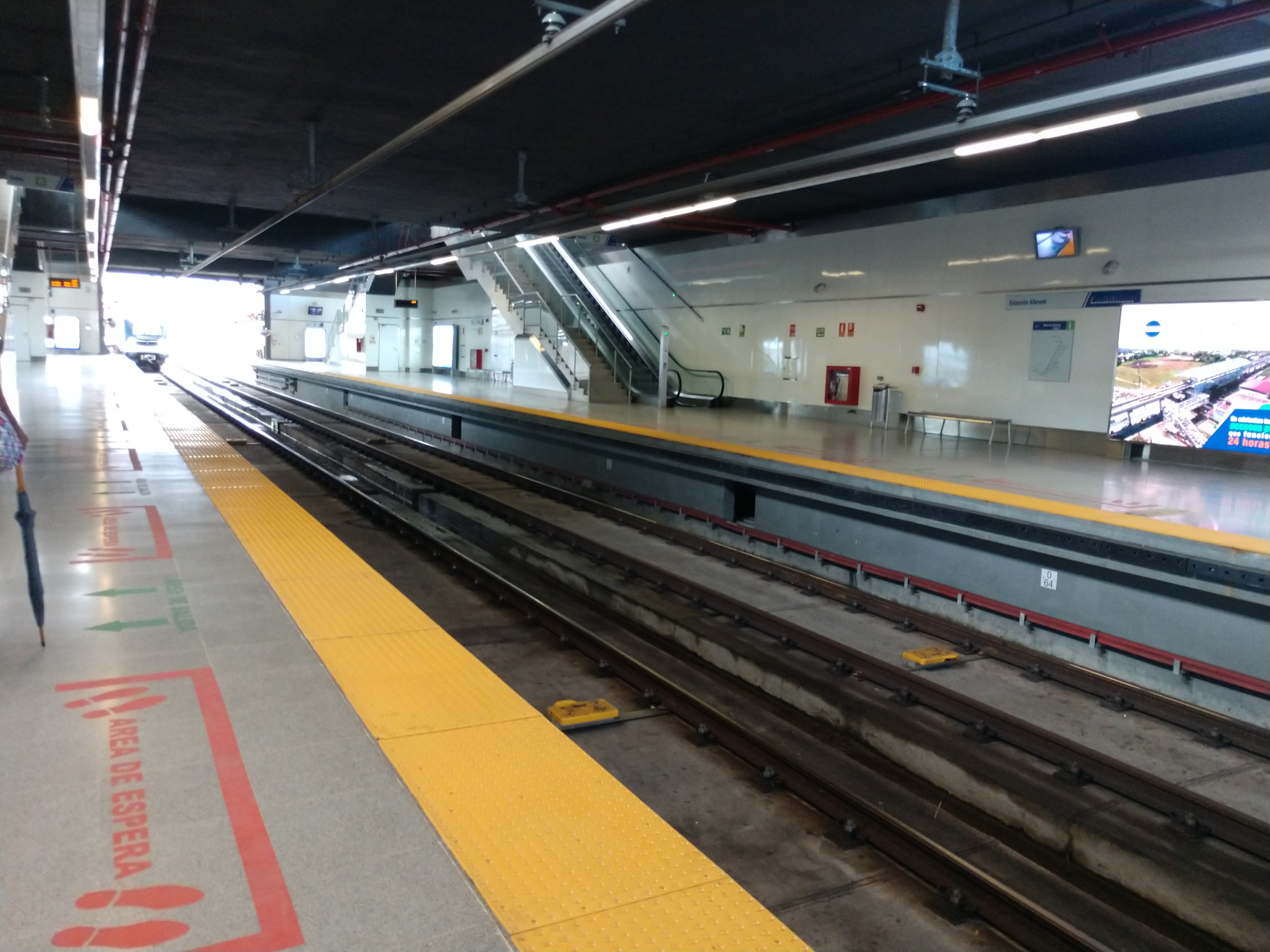
- Albrook station platforms

General information
- Location: Albrook, Panamá District; Panama City; Panama
- Coordinates: 8°58′24″N 79°32′59″W
- Platforms: Current: 2 side platforms Future: 1 side platform (L1); 1 cross-platform interchange (L1 and L3); 1 side platform (L3)
- Tracks: 2

Construction
- Structure type: Below-grade

History
- Opened: 5 April 2014; 12 years ago

Services
Preceding station	Panama Metro	Following station
Terminus	Line 1	5 de Mayo toward Villa Zaita

Future services
Preceding station	Panama Metro	Following station
Panamá Pacífico toward Ciudad del Futuro	Line 3	Terminus
Location

Albrook station is a below-grade rapid transit station on Line 1 of the Panama Metro system. As of 2024, it serves as the western terminus of Line 1. In the future, it will also function as the eastern terminus of Line 3, a monorail line, making it a key transfer point for the system. Albrook was one of the original 11 stations of the metro network, inaugurated on 5 April 2014. A pedestrian footbridge connects the station to both the city's main intercity bus terminal and Albrook Mall. During its first year of operation, Albrook ranked as the third most-used station in the network.

== Gallery ==
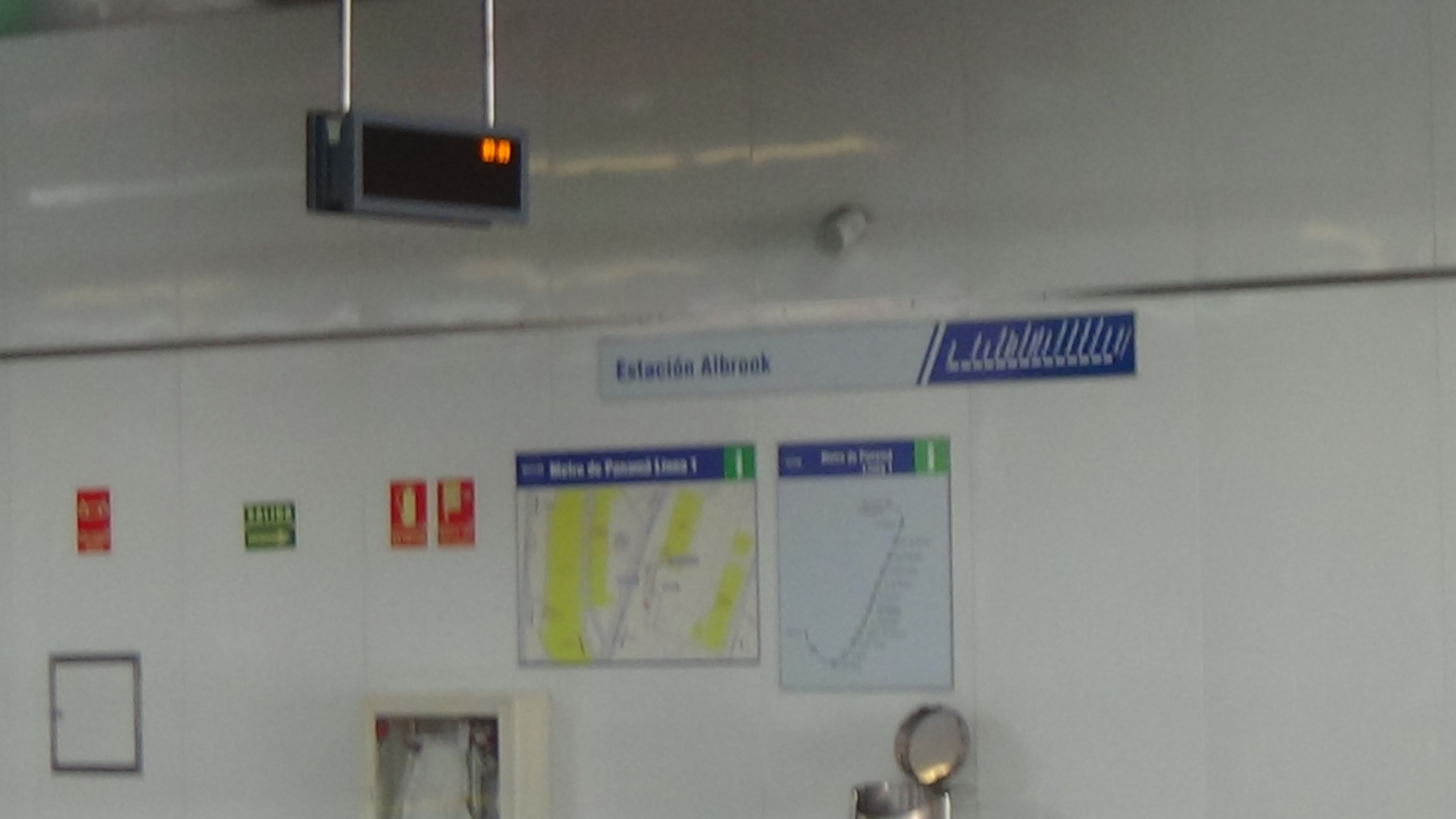
Station sign

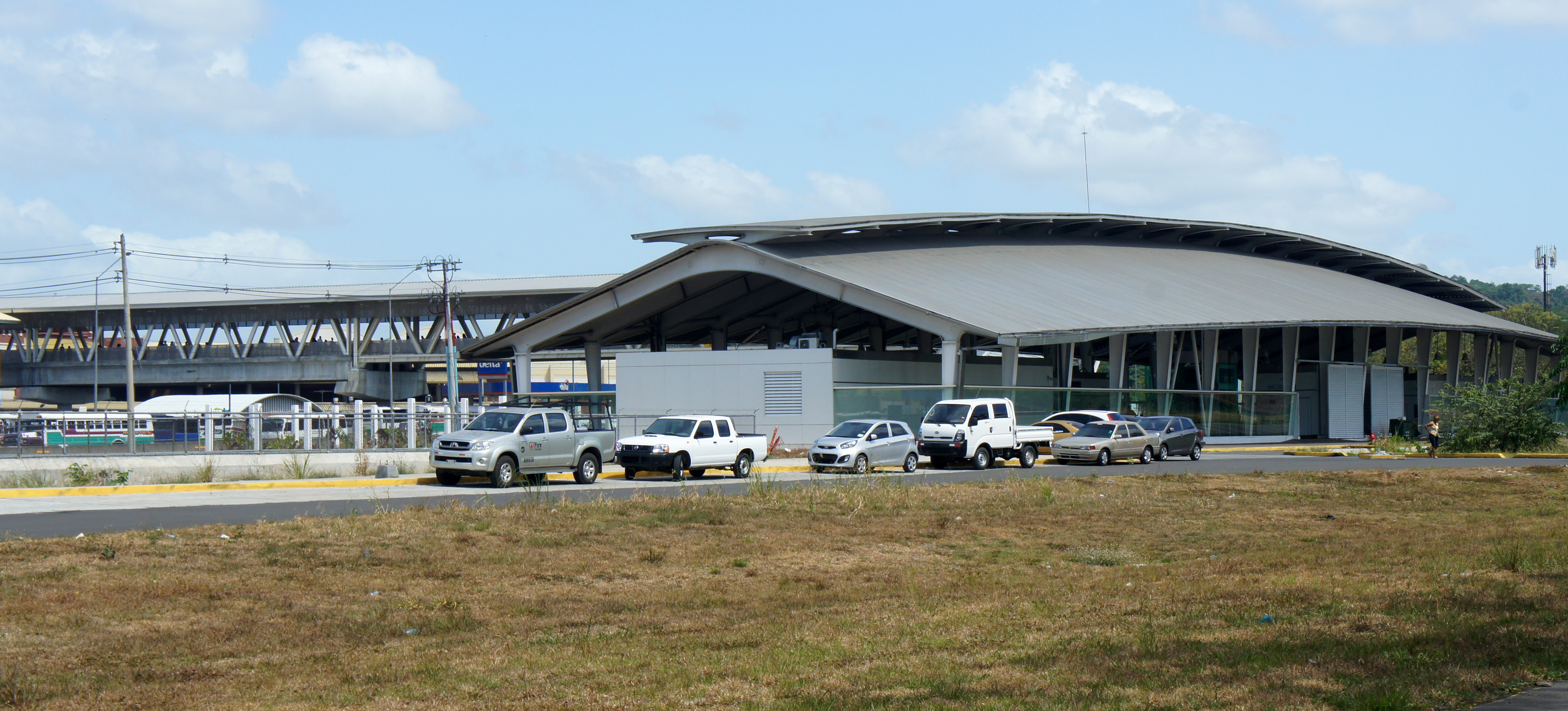
Station building

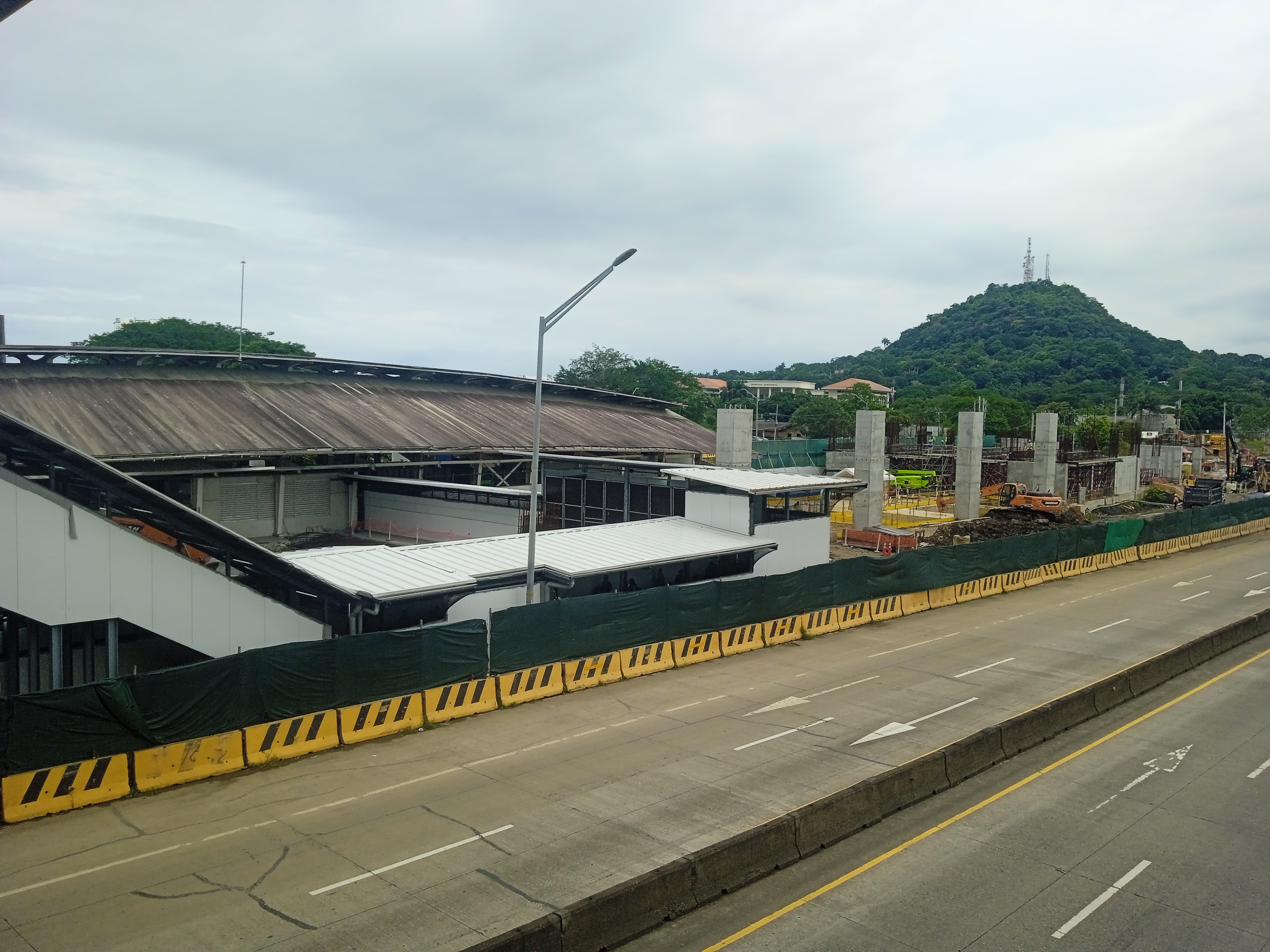
Line 3 under construction
