= Burunga, Panama =

Burunga
- Corregimiento
- Location within Panama
- Coordinates: 8.9703°N 79.6725°W
- Country: Panama
- Province: Panamá Oeste
- District: Arraiján
- Established: April 30, 2003

Area
  - Land: 52.4 km^{2} (20.2 sq mi)

Population (2010)
  - Total: 39,102
  - Density: 745.7/km^{2} (1,931/sq mi)
- Population density calculated based on land area.
- Time zone: UTC−5 (EST)

Burunga is a corregimiento in Arraiján District, Panamá Oeste Province, Panama with a population of 39,102 as of 2010. It was created by Law 42 of April 30, 2003.
