= Hitachi Monorail =

Family of monorails by Hitachi Rail

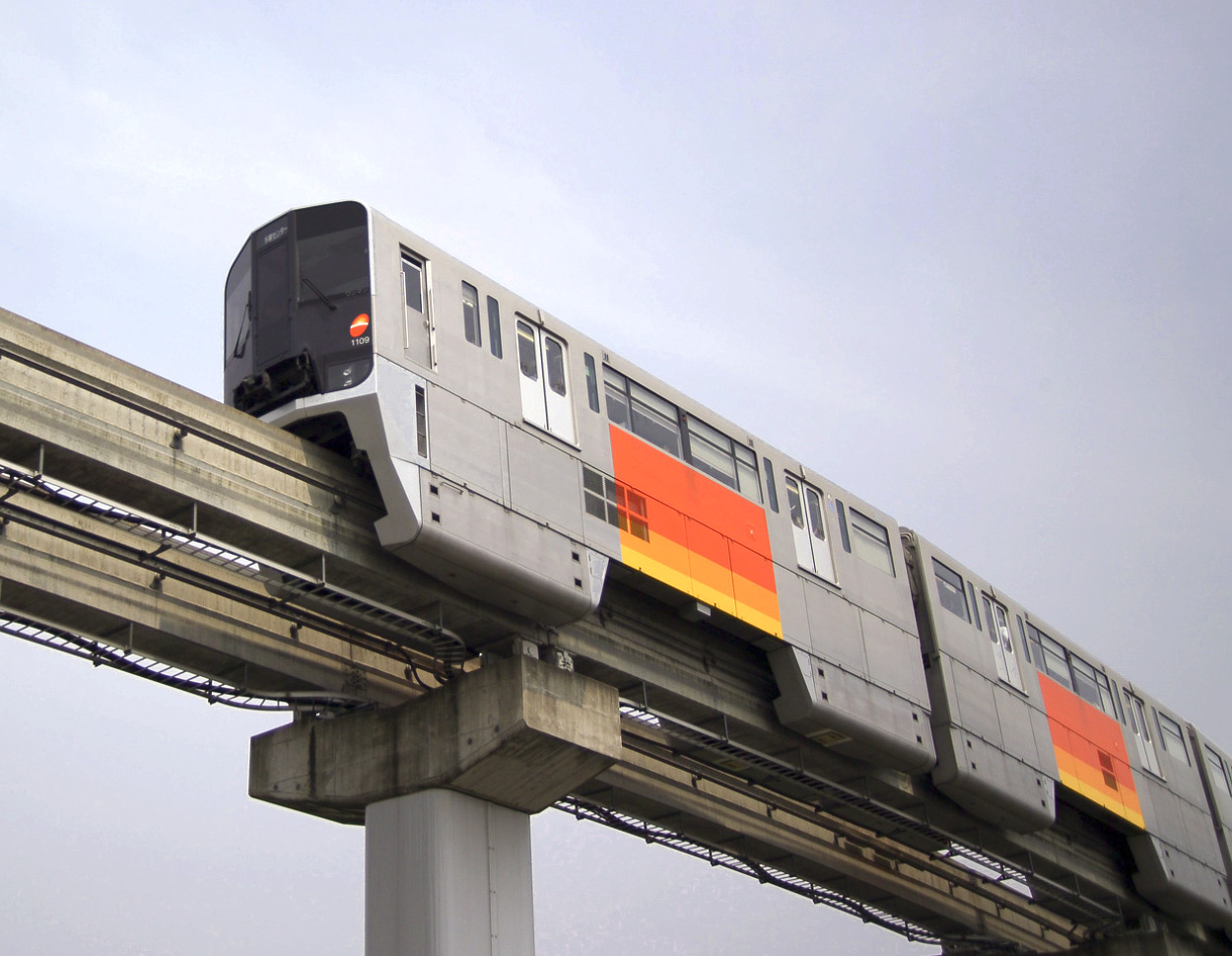
Tama Toshi Monorail, a "Large" Hitachi monorail system

The Hitachi Monorail System refers to the family of monorails offered by Hitachi Rail.

== List of notable Hitachi monorails ==
Hitachi's designs are Alweg-based, and are available in three configurations:

Type	Capacity (Note: Represents regular load (three passengers per square metre) for a four-car trainset.)	Axle load	Track beam	Turning radius
Large	415	11 t (24,000 lb)	0.85 × 1.5 m (2.8 × 4.9 ft)	70 m (230 ft)
Standard	348	10 t (22,000 lb)	0.8 × 1.4 m (2.6 × 4.6 ft)	70 m (230 ft)
Small	194	8 t (18,000 lb)	0.7 × 1.3 m (2.3 × 4.3 ft)	40 m (130 ft)

All Hitachi trains except those on Japan's oldest operational monorail have floors entirely above all the wheels.

Location	Country	Name	Opened	Stations	Length in km (mi)	Type	Notes
Chongqing	China	Lines 2 & 3, Chongqing Rail Transit	2005	70	96.5 (60.0)	Large	Two sets, remaining built by CRRC
Tokyo	Japan	Tokyo Monorail	1964	11	17.8 (11.1)	Standard	
Naha	Japan	Okinawa Urban Monorail	2003	19	17 (11)	Standard	
Western Tokyo	Japan	Tama Toshi Monorail Line	1998	19	16 (9.9)	Large	
Kitakyushu	Japan	Kitakyushu Monorail	1985	13	8.8 (5.5)	Large	
Osaka Prefecture	Japan	Main & Saito lines, Osaka Monorail	1990	18	28 (17)	Large	
Urayasu	Japan	Disney Resort Line	2001	4	5 (3.1)	Standard	
Kuala Lumpur	Malaysia	Kuala Lumpur Monorail	2003	11	8.6 (5.3)	Standard	Built under license by Scomi Rail
West Panama & Panama City	Panama	Panama Metro Line 3	2028	11	24.5 (15.2)	Large	
Singapore	Singapore	Sentosa Express	2007	4	2.1 (1.3)	Small	
Daegu	South Korea	Daegu Metro Line 3	2015	30	23.9 (14.9)	Large	Prototype set, remaining built by Woojin
Dubai	United Arab Emirates	Palm Monorail	2009	4	5.45 (3.39)	Standard	

== Picture gallery ==
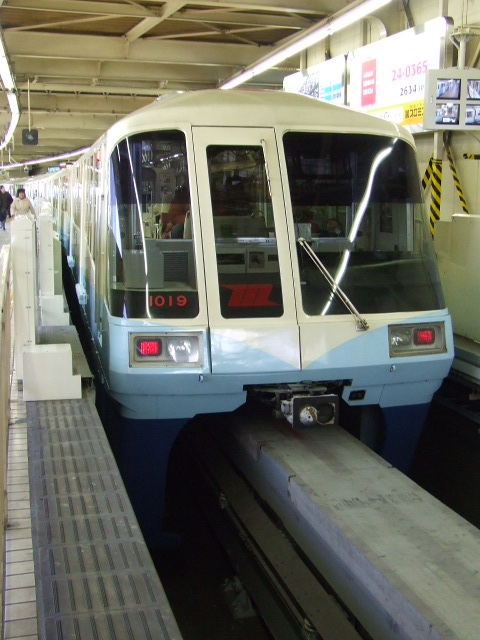
Tokyo Monorail

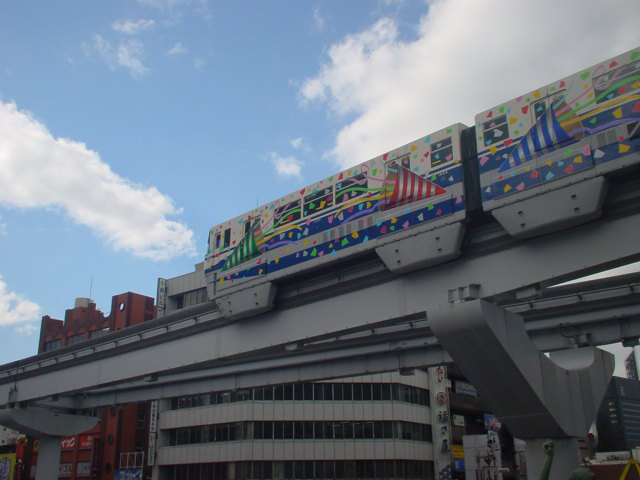
Kitakyushu Monorail

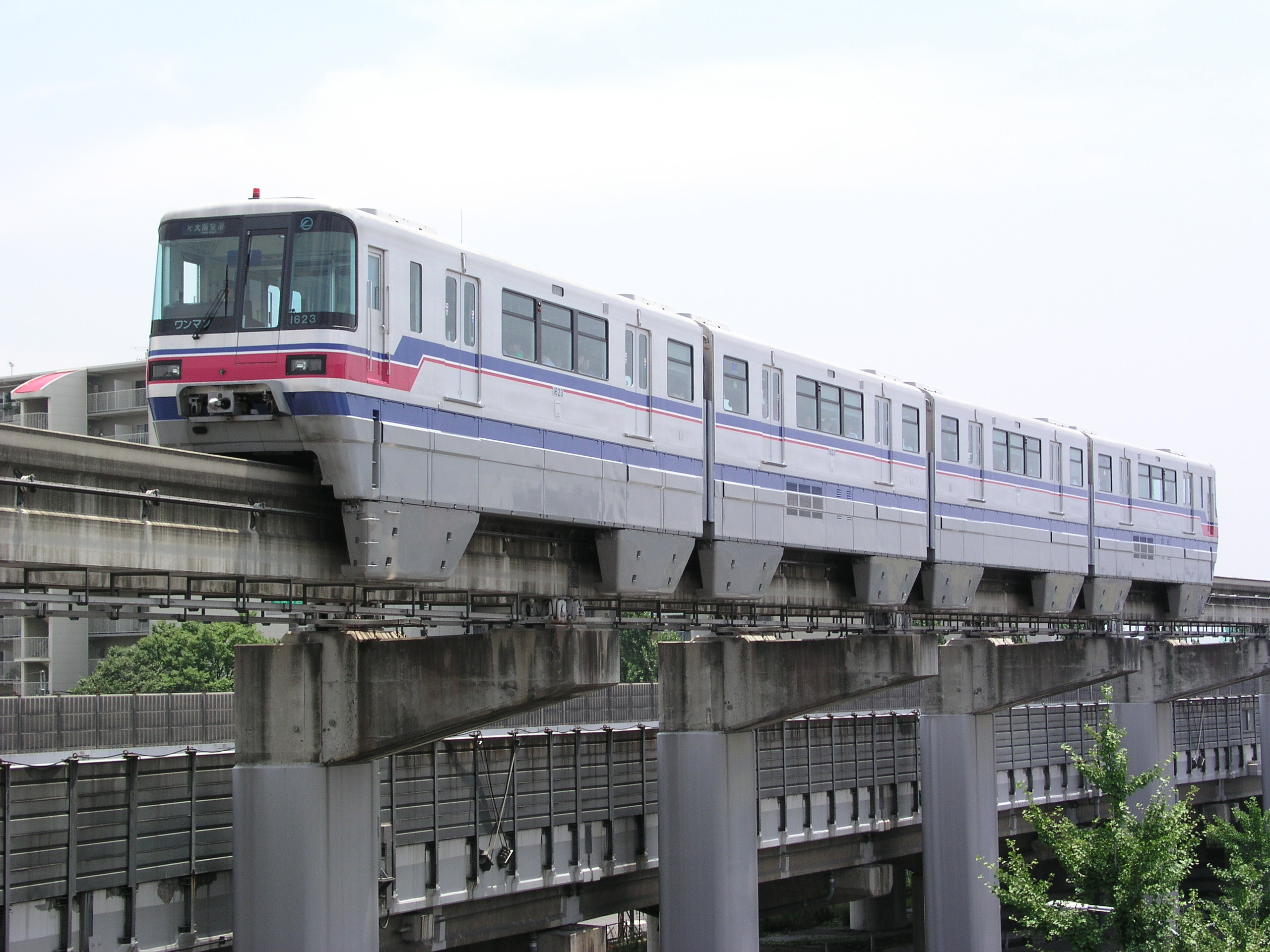
Osaka Monorail

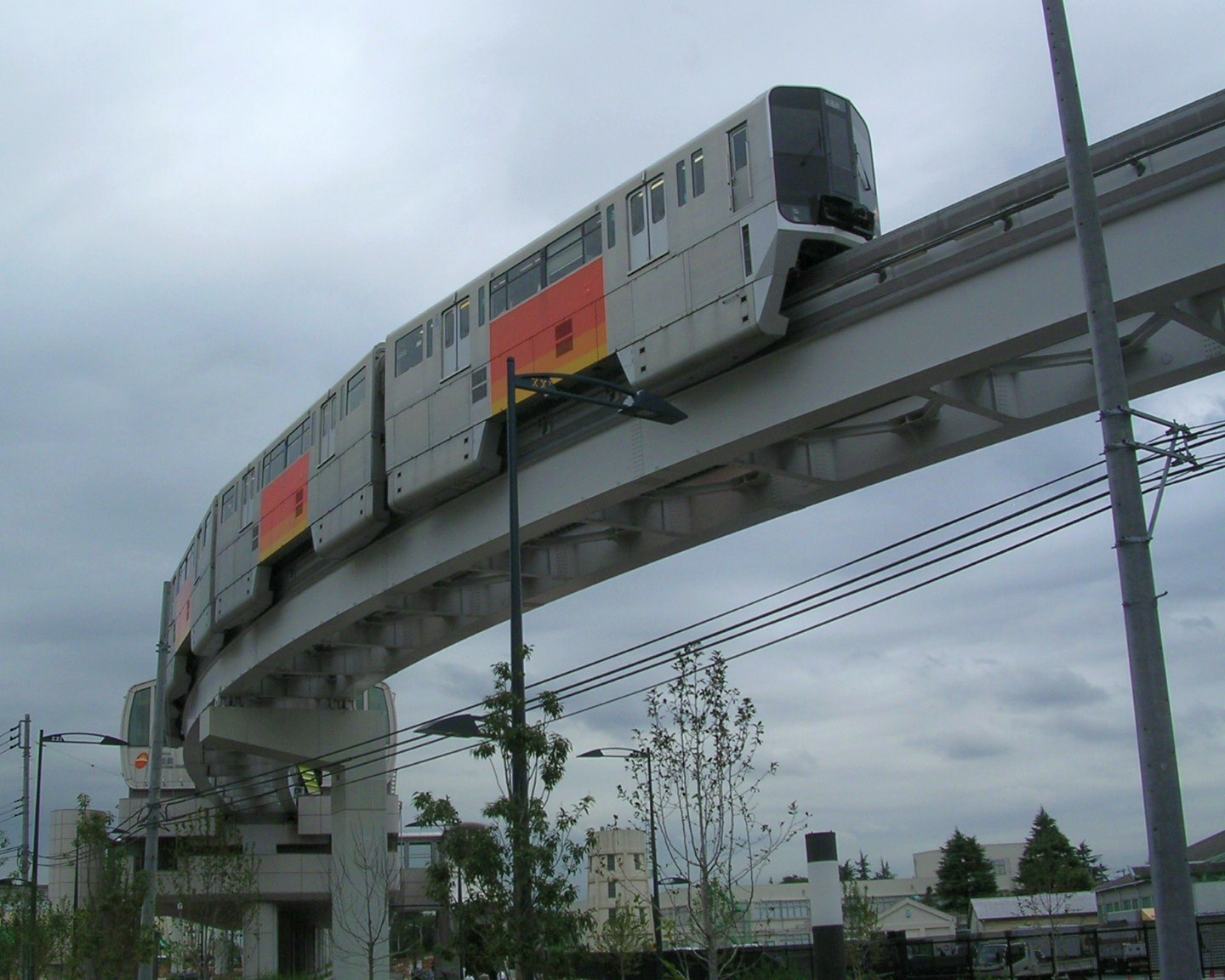
Tama Toshi Monorail Line

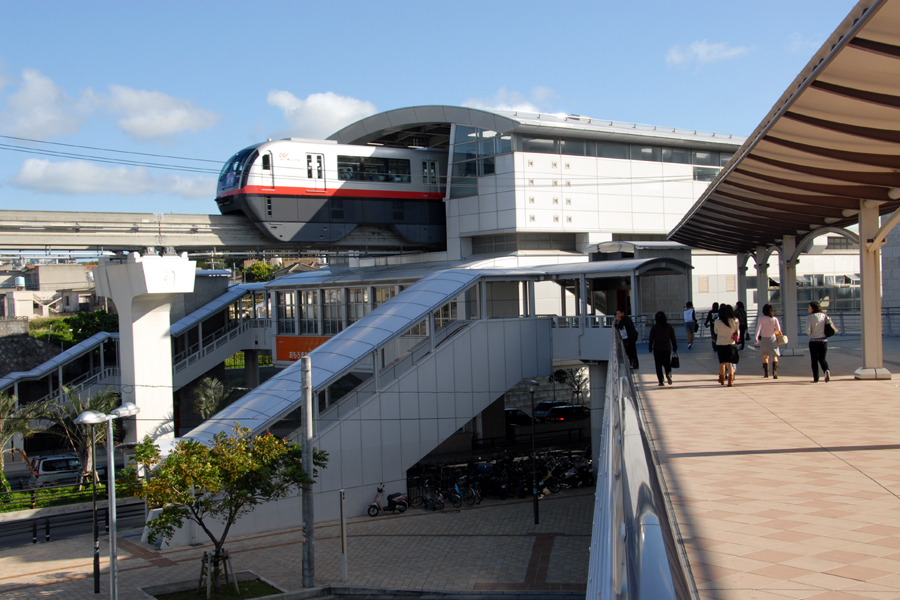
Okinawa Urban Monorail

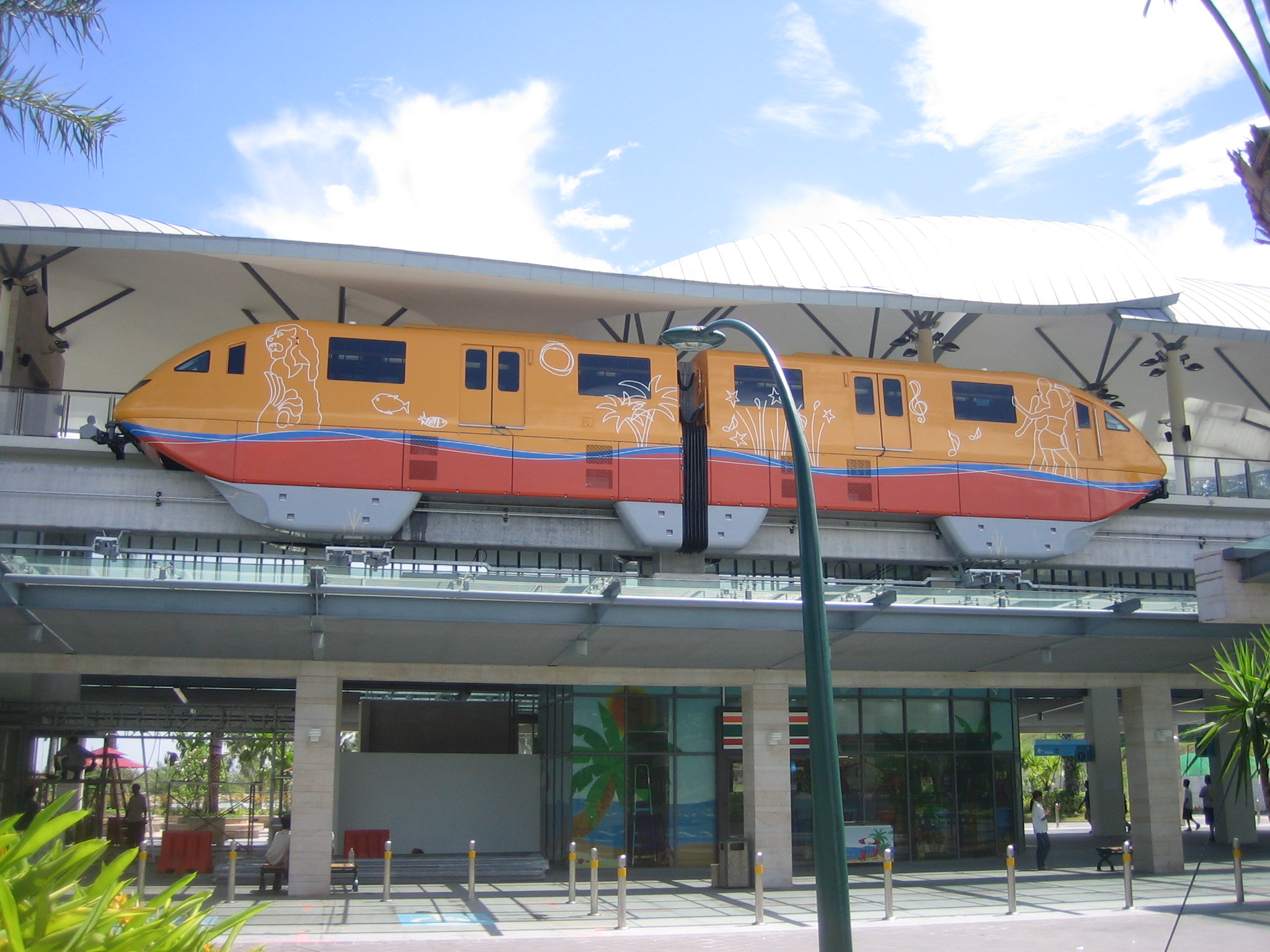
Sentosa Express

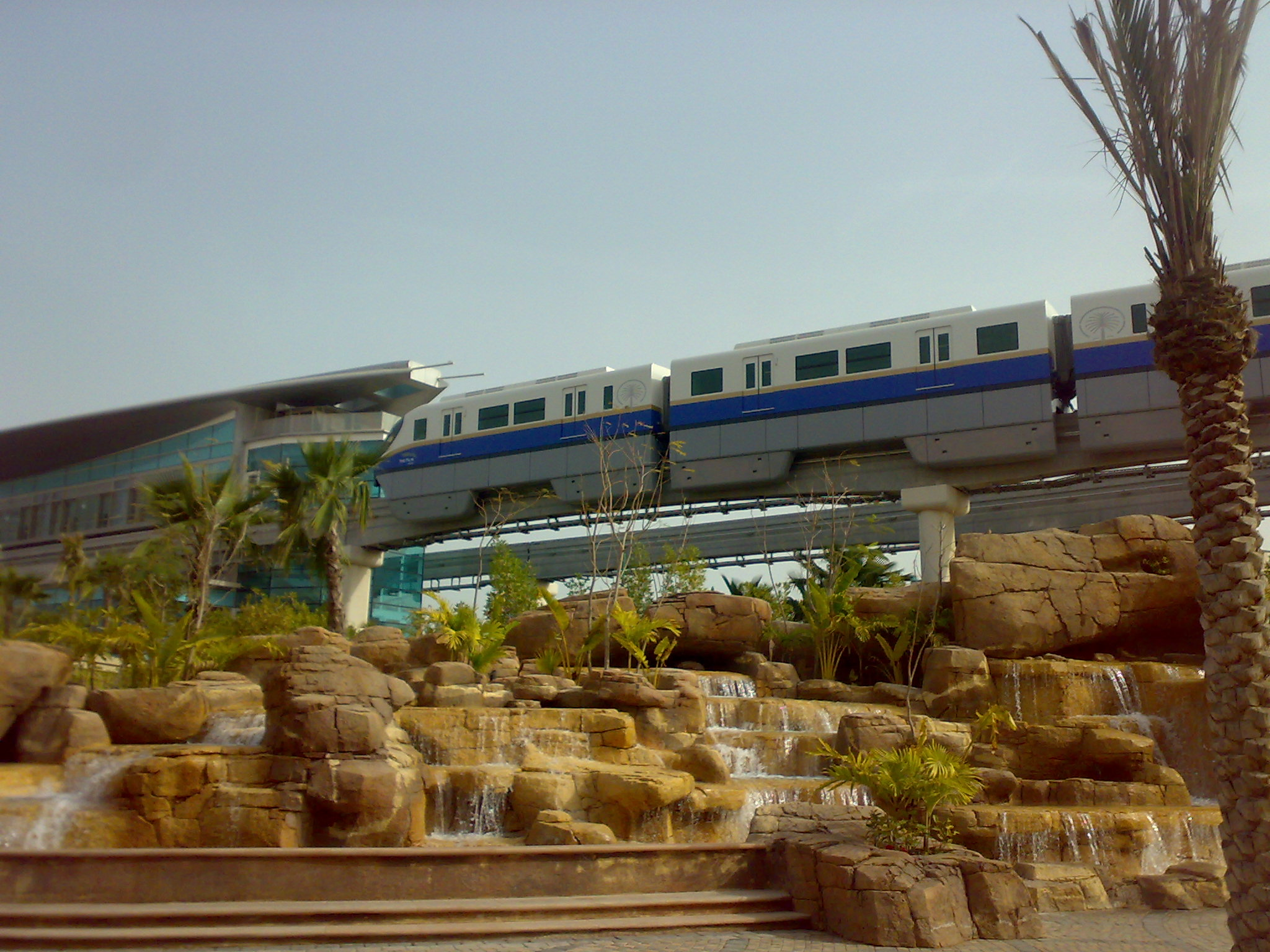
Palm Jumeirah Monorail

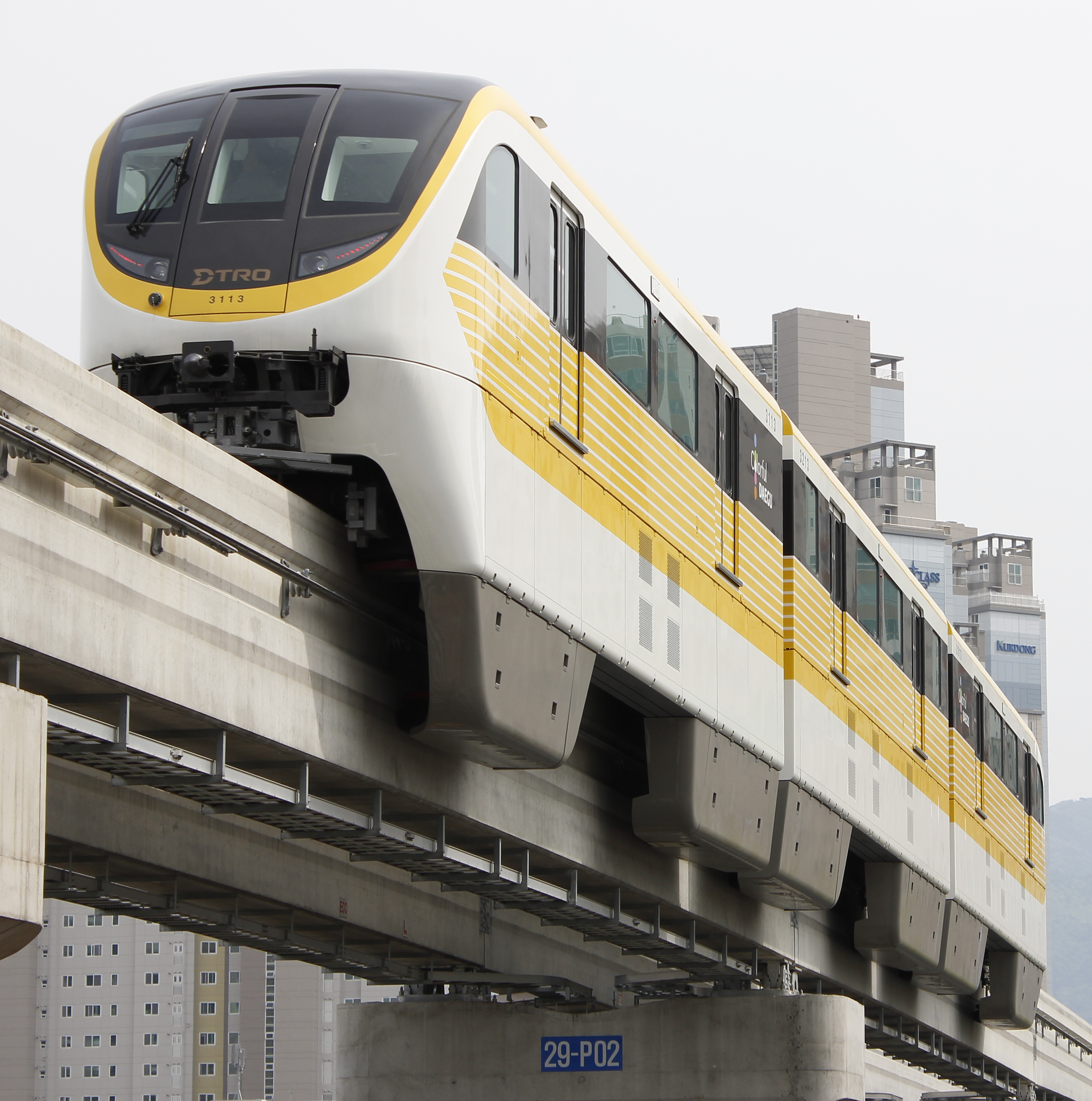
Daegu Metro Line 3

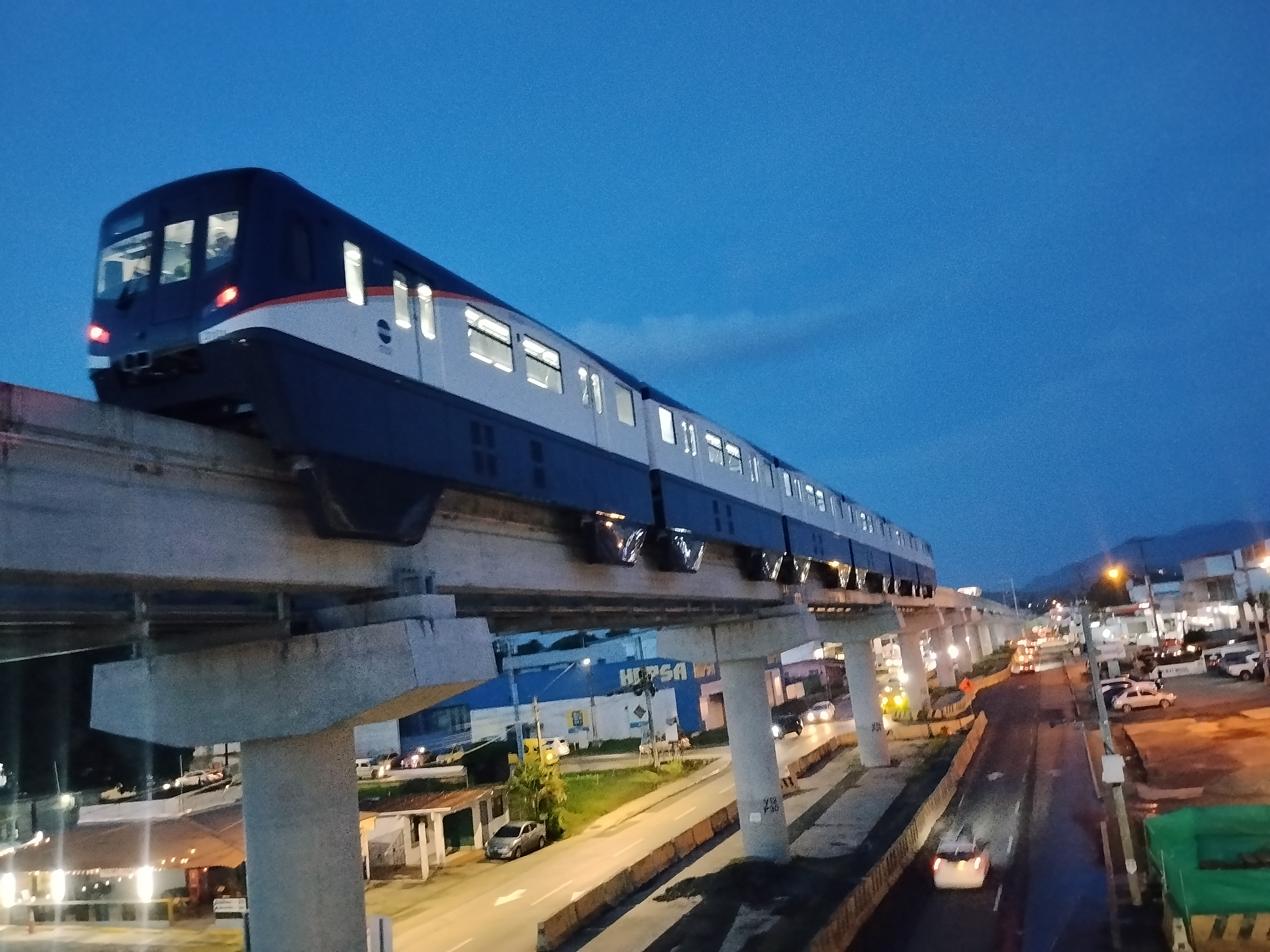
Panama Metro Line 3
