= Juan Demóstenes Arosemena, Panama =

Coordinates: 8.9197°N 79.7200°W

Juan Demóstenes Arosemena
- Corregimiento
- Location within Panama
- Country: Panama
- Province: Panamá Oeste
- District: Arraiján

Area
  - Land: 40.7 km^{2} (15.7 sq mi)

Population (2010)
  - Total: 37,044
  - Density: 909.8/km^{2} (2,356/sq mi)
- Population density calculated based on land area.
- Time zone: UTC−5 (EST)

Juan Demóstenes Arosemena is a corregimiento in Arraiján District, Panamá Oeste Province, Panama with a population of 37,044 as of 2010. Its population as of 1990 was 13,418; its population as of 2000 was 24,792.
