= Vista Alegre, Panama =

Vista Alegre
- Corregimiento
- Location within Panama
- Coordinates: 8.9301°N 79.6991°W
- Country: Panama
- Province: Panamá Oeste
- District: Arraiján

Area
  - Land: 30.4 km^{2} (11.7 sq mi)

Population (2010)
  - Total: 55,369
  - Density: 1,818.8/km^{2} (4,711/sq mi)
- Population density calculated based on land area.
- Time zone: UTC−5 (EST)

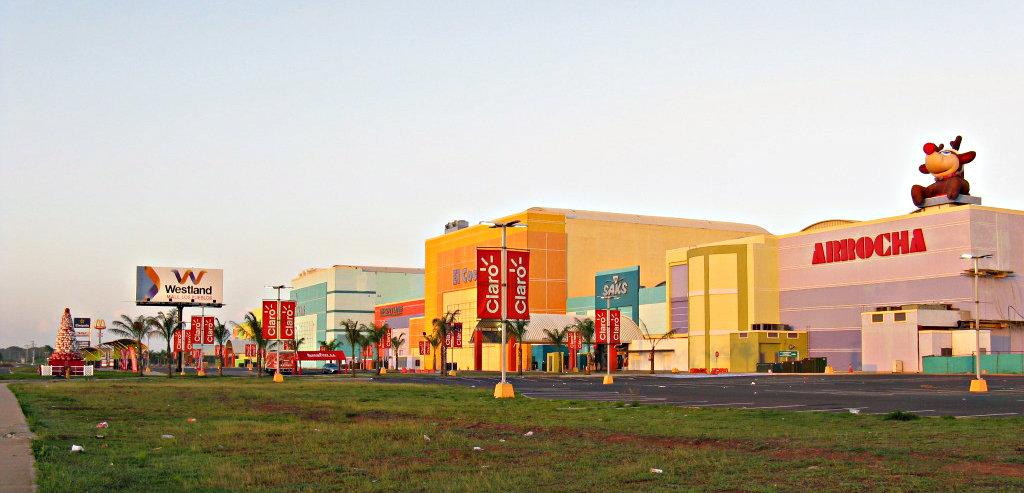
Westland Mall in Vista Alegre

Vista Alegre is a corregimiento in Arraiján District, Panamá Oeste Province, Panama with a population of 55,369 as of 2010. Its population as of 1990 was 11,801; its population as of 2000 was 39,097.
