= Osaka Monorail 1000 series =

Japanese monorail train type

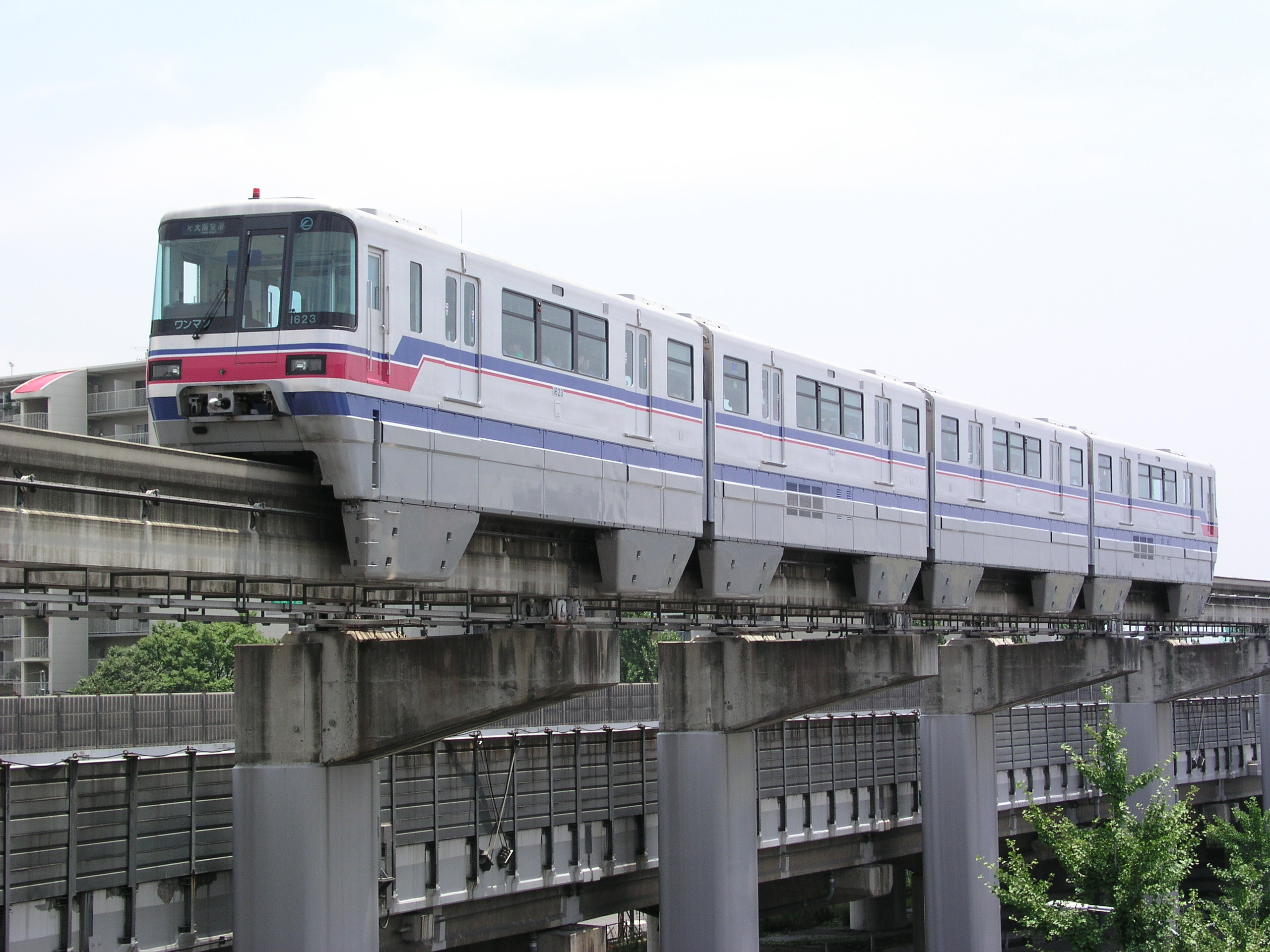
- 1000 series third build train
- In service: 1990 - Present
- Manufacturers: Hitachi (sets 01, 02, 05, 06, 31, 21-23); Kawasaki Heavy Industries (sets 03, 04, 32, 24, 25)
- Built at: Kudamatsu (sets 01, 02, 05, 06, 31, 21-23); Kobe (sets 03, 04, 32, 24, 25)
- Constructed: 1989–1998
- Refurbished: 2007–2009
- Number built: 52 vehicles (13 sets)
- Number in service: 24 vehicles (6 sets)
- Number scrapped: 32 vehicles (8 sets, including set 32 in 2018 due to earthquake damage)
- Formation: 4 cars per trainset
- Operator: Osaka Monorail

Specifications
- Car body construction: Aluminium alloy
- Doors: 2 pairs per side
- Maximum speed: 75 km/h (46.6 mph)
- Traction system: Excitation field chopper control
- Traction motors: 16 × 80 kW (107 hp) EFZO-SPKK60 self-ventilated DC shunt-wound motor
- Power output: 1.28 MW (1,717 hp)
- Acceleration: 0.83 m/s^{2} (1.9 mph/s)
- Deceleration: 1.1 m/s^{2} (2.5 mph/s) (service); 1.3 m/s^{2} (2.9 mph/s) (emergency)
- Electric systems: 1,500 V DC
- Braking systems: Regenerative brake, electronically controlled pneumatic brakes
- Safety system: ATC

The 1000 series (1000系) is a type of monorail train operated on the Osaka Monorail since 1989. The trains were built by Hitachi, Ltd. and Kawasaki Heavy Industries, have aluminium bodies, and operate as four-car formations.

== Build details ==
Set No.	Manufacturer	Date delivered	Withdrawn	Scrapped
01	Hitachi	1989		
02	Hitachi	1989		June 8, 2021
03	Kawasaki Heavy Industries	1989		
04	Kawasaki Heavy Industries	1989		
05	Hitachi	1989		
06	Hitachi	1989		August 5, 2021
31	Hitachi	1992		
32	Kawasaki Heavy Industries	1995	2018*	2020
21	Hitachi	1997		
22	Hitachi	1997		
23	Hitachi	1997		
24	Kawasaki Heavy Industries	1997		
25	Kawasaki Heavy Industries	1998		

- Withdrawn due to damage sustained from the 2018 Osaka earthquake.
