= Arraiján District =

Arraiján
- District

- Location of the district capital in Panama
- Coordinates: 8°57′N 79°39′W
- Country: Panama
- Province: Panamá Oeste
- Capital: Arraiján

Area
  - Total: 418 km^{2} (161 sq mi)

Population (2019)
  - Total: 296,188
- official estimate
- Time zone: UTC-5 (ETZ)

Arraiján is the district (distrito) of West Panamá Province in Panama. The territory lies west of the Panama Canal bordering Panama City. The population according to the 2000 census was 149,918; the latest official estimate (for 2019) is 296,188, with many suburban communities for commuting workers of Panama City. The district covers a total area of 418 km^{2} (161 sq mi). The district seat is Arraiján city.

== Administrative divisions ==
Arraiján District is divided administratively into the following corregimientos:

- Arraiján (capital)
- Juan Demóstenes Arosemena
- Nuevo Emperador
- Santa Clara
- Veracruz
- Vista Alegre
- Burunga
- Cerro Silvestre

== Education ==
The Lycée français Paul Gauguin de Panama, a French international school, is in Panama Pacifico in Veracruz.
