= Arraiján =

- City and corregimiento
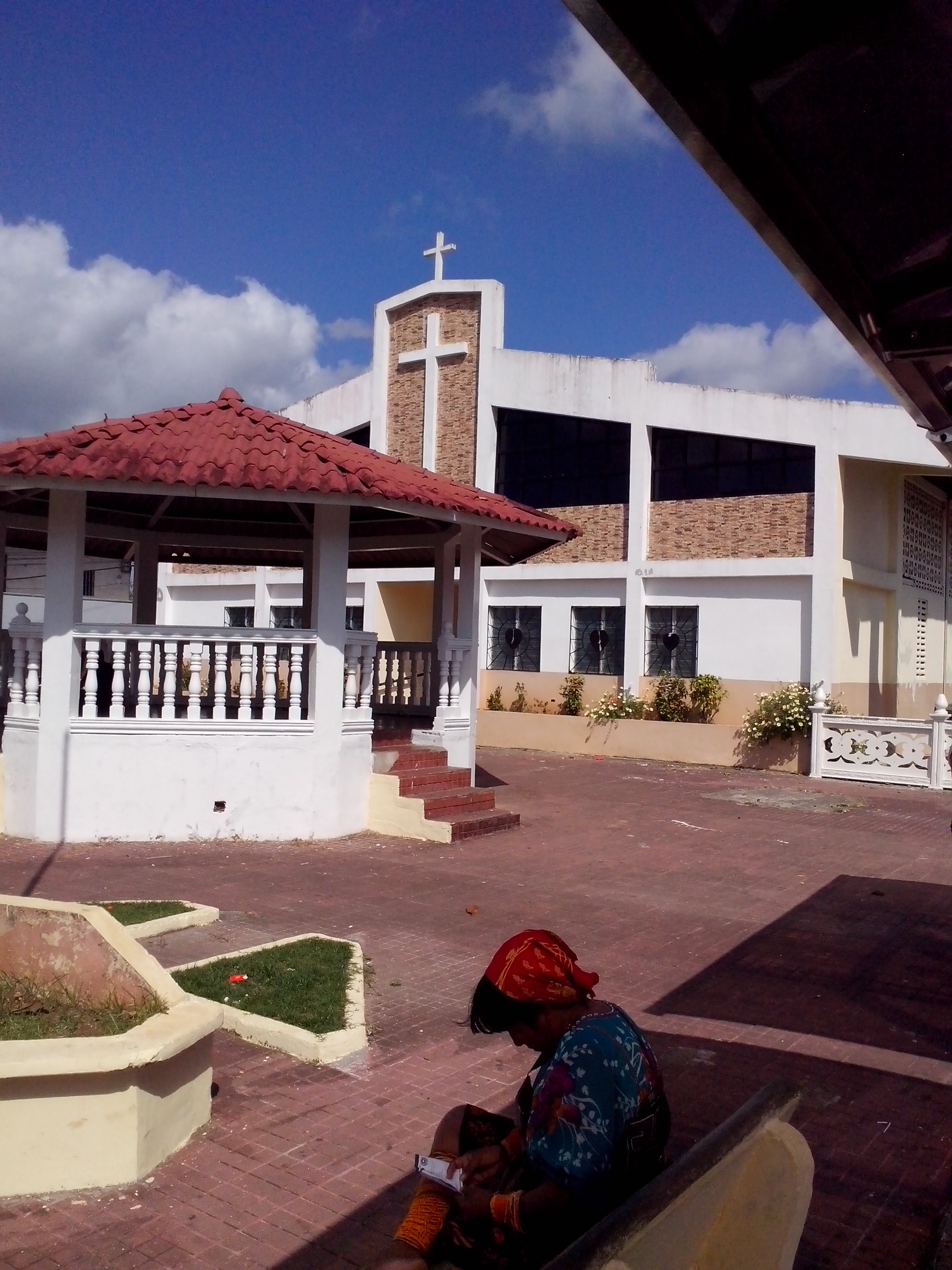
- Main plaza

- Location within Panama
- Coordinates: 8°57′0″N 79°39′0″W
- Country: Panama
- Province: Panamá Oeste
- District: Arraiján

Area
  - Land: 65.5 km^{2} (25.3 sq mi)

Population (2010)
  - Total: 41,041
  - Density: 626.8/km^{2} (1,623/sq mi)
- Population density calculated based on land area.
- Time zone: UTC−5 (EST)

Arraiján is a city and corregimiento in Arraiján District, Panamá Oeste Province, Panama with a population of 41,041 as of 2010. It is the seat of Arraiján District. Its population as of 1990 was 24,665; its population as of 2000 was 64,772.
