= Gilinski =

Gilinski is a surname. Notable people with the surname include:

- Isaac Gilinski (fl. 2000), Colombian-born business executive and theorist
- Isaac Gilinski Sragowicz (born 1934), Colombian banker and financier
- Jaime Gilinski Bacal (born 1957), Panama-based Colombian banker, investor, and real estate developer

== See also ==
- Gilinski Group
