= Fortune Systems =

Defunct American computer company

Fortune Systems Corporation
- Trade name: Tigera Group, Inc. (1987–1996); Connectivity Technologies, Inc. (1996–2011)
- Company type: Public
- Industry: Computer
- Founded: September 1980; 45 years ago in Foster City, California
- Founders: Gary B. Friedman; David van den Berg; Homer Dunn
- Defunct: 2011; 15 years ago
- Products: Fortune 32:16
- Number of employees: Over 534 (1984, peak)

Fortune Systems Corporation, later Tigera Group, Inc. and Connectivity Technologies, Inc., was an American computer hardware and software company active from 1980 to 2011. The company existed as a manufacturer of Unix workstations between 1980 and 1987 and are most well known for their Fortune 32:16 line of Motorola 68000-based workstations. Following years of financial turmoil and executive churn, the company left the computer industry after selling the majority of their hardware assets off in 1987, followed by their software assets in 1988.

== History ==
=== 1980–1983: Beginnings and early success ===
Fortune Systems Corporation was formed in September 1980 in Foster City, California. Its principal founder was Gary B. Friedman, who had previously co-founded Itel Corporation, another San Francisco company in the business of leasing industrial equipment such as mainframe computers, with Peter Redfield in 1967. Before founding Itel, Friedman had worked for International Business Machines Corporation (IBM) from 1955 to 1967, as a manager within that company's marketing department. Friedman left Itel in August 1979 after it had collapsed amid a catastrophic debt default and entered Chapter 11 bankruptcy protection, described by The New York Times as "the largest and most complex bankruptcies in [American] history" up to that point. Friedman was joined in founding the company with David van den Berg and Homer Dunn, also previously of Itel. Fortune began development of their to-be-flagship product, the Fortune 32:16—a relatively inexpensive, multiuser workstation running Unix and based on the Motorola 68000 microprocessor—in early 1980, before the company was formally incorporated.

In September 1981, by which point the company employed over 50 people, Fortune raised $8.5 million in venture capital from the French Thomson SARL company. This was the largest raising of capital for a start-up personal computer company at the time. In exchange for their investment, Thomson received the rights to distribute and remarket the Fortune 32:16 as the Micromega 32 in France. Other early investors included the First Chicago Bank, BNP Paribas, Walter E. Heller and Company, and the Greyhound Computer Corporation of Phoenix, Arizona; at 33 percent, Thomson's stake in Fortune was the largest of the bunch. As a result of the capital infusion, Fortune moved their headquarters to a 26,000-square-foot plant in San Carlos, California, starting in October 1981. The move was complete by April 1982. That month, the company received an additional $10.5 million in venture capital from multiple investors, followed by another $1.5 million from Thomson in June 1982.

In November 1981, Fortune publicly unveiled the 32:16 at the COMDEX/Fall 1981 show at the MGM Grand in Las Vegas, Nevada. According to InfoWorld, Fortune at COMDEX was "clearly the technological talk" of that year's COMDEX, with the company's booth drawing massive crowds during the entire duration of the show. The company promised a $5000 floppy drive-based computer, which it intended to sell through retail stores, both because of the larger margins and because large OEMs chose rival Convergent Technologies. Fortune signed a distribution agreement with the Computerland retail chain in March 1982, and began taking orders for the 32:16 worldwide (barring France, where Thomson resold it as the Micromega 32) in June 1982, delivering the first of the units to customers in August 1982. In the popular computing press, the Fortune 32:16 was warmly received, with Byte's Steven H. Barry summarizing that it offered an "outstanding business-operating environment with a reasonably good technical development environment", while Practical Computing's Una Sheehan concluded it was poised to replace larger minicomputers "for most office purposes". However, adoption rates were slow—the company selling only 5,600 units of the 32:16 within six months of market introduction—and reports of technical issues and poor software selection began to mar its reputation. Most criticized was its lackluster performance in multiuser configurations, where too many terminals slowed down the system so much as to be unusable. Despite these concerns, the company was able to raise $112 million with its initial public offering in March 1983—one of the largest ever IPOs in American history at that point. Fortune's sales also peaked for the first quarter of 1983, at $20.8 million, from which they were able to make a $3.3 million profit.

=== 1983–1987: IPO and volatility ===
By fall 1983, however, the valuation of Fortune's stock had declined precipitously, from over $22 a share in March to around $7.50 in October of the same year. The company was never able to fulfill its promise of a usable $5000 floppy disk-based product. Sales dropped in tandem, from $12 million in the second quarter of 1983 to $9.1 million in the third quarter, the company losing $3 million in the second quarter and $9.1 million in the third quarter. The company's board of directors, meanwhile, became increasingly dissatisfied with Friedman's management style. On the heels of the release of their second generation of workstations in October 1983, Friedman announced his resignation from the company, citing differences with Fortune's board of directors. David I. Caplan was immediately named Fortune's interim CEO. In December 1983, James S. Campbell, formerly of Shugart Associates, was named Fortune's new permanent CEO, with Caplan demoted to executive vice president.

By dint of Fortune's tremendous IPO, the company retained $54 million in cash reserves around the end of 1983, helping the company stage a turnaround. Fortune's new owners were able increase sales dramatically, shipping over 2,000 workstations (including their new Professional System and Expanded Performance products) in December 1983 alone, bringing the total number of Fortune installations up to more than 20,000 by March 1984. Revenues in the last quarter of 1983 increased to $12.6 million, while losses decreased to $6.6 million. While 1984 started out promising for the company, the company turned a profit only in the second quarter of 1984 (their first profitable quarter in over a year). In the following quarter of 1984, the company reported another net loss, of $3.7 million. Campbell attributed the loss to a decrease in the company's international sales, as well as mounting competition from IBM and AT&T, established stalwarts of the computer industry, in the Unix workstations arena. The up-and-coming Altos Computer Systems—described by one journalist as Fortune's fiercest competitor—were also making fast in-roads in Fortune's market segment.

During 1984, the company experienced two runs of layoffs that saw 22 executives leave and many more workers dismissed, leaving the company with 512 workers by the end of the year. In August 1984, Fortune announced that they were in talks to acquire North Star Computers, a microcomputer manufactured based in nearby Berkeley, California, for $14 million. Fortune had given North Star Computers around $3.7 million in debt financing. Shortly before another product refresh at Fortune, Dunn and van den Berg, the company's last remaining co-founders, resigned from their posts in July 1984, supposedly in anticipation of the executive churn that would occur as the result of the merger. North Star and Fortune called off their merger in October 1984, however, with the two companies agreeing to collaborate on forthcoming hardware projects nonetheless.

Also in August 1984, ComputerLand filed a lawsuit against Fortune Systems, claiming $1 million in punitive damages due to what they alleged were fraud, misrepresentation and breach of contract on the part of Fortune. ComputerLand, Fortune's largest retail partner, alleged that the 32:16 was technically fraught and not as multiuser-capable as Fortune had promised, leading to a high rate of return and unsalable inventory. In January 1985, the two settled out of court on amicable terms, Fortune agreeing to pay a fraction of ComputerLand's stated damages and agreeing to repair around 100 defective units from within Computerland's warehouse at no added cost. Fortune's retail-oriented strategy failed, UnixWorld wrote in 1985, because its product was too expensive and uninteresting to customers visiting stores.

Fortune reported losses of between $10 million and $12 million in the final quarter of 1984 and estimated that they had lost upwards of $19 million in total throughout the year. In April 1985, Fortune laid off 100 of their 512 employees, or 20 percent of its entire workforce. By then the company had officially ended retail sales; UnixWorld estimated in late 1985 that 15% of sales were through VARs and distributors, 45% to large corporate direct sales, and 40% to large international customers and OEMs. Fortune estimated an installed base of 40-45,000 units, and a ratio of one server to three terminals. Throughout 1985, the company lost $23.5 million, and in beginning of 1986, Fortune laid off an additional 41 workers in the beginning of 1986 amid a planned restructuring of the company. Following the layoffs, Fortune announced their first profitable quarter in nearly two years, and the rest of 1986 would remain profitable for the company, barring one quarter. While still in the red, Fortune suffered less of a loss in 1986 compared to 1985.

In July 1985, Fortune partnered with Kirloskar Group, a large conglomerate of India, to provide the latter with thousands of workstations for their daily operations. The deal was one of the first alliances between an American computer company and an Indian corporation.

=== 1987–2011: Decline, pivots, and acquisition ===
Around the turn of 1986 into 1987, Fortune announced the establishment of Tigera, a subsidiary dedicated chiefly to Fortune's software—namely their office automation products. In February 1987, several of Fortune's executives vied to purchase Fortune's hardware manufacturing business in a friendly buyout offer. The management group leading the prospective buyout was led by Robert A. Davis and Brooke P. Taylor, who were Fortune's executive VP of marketing and president of Fortune's international subsidiary, respectively. Fortune ultimately rejected this offer a month later, in favor of selling their entire research and development operations, manufacturing lines, and sales, marketing, and support staff—the vast majority of Fortune's assets—to SCI Systems of Huntsville, Alabama, for between $15 million and $17 million. Tigera earned $24.2 million in cash from the deal, while most of Fortune's remaining 265 employees were rehired by SCI. Reflecting their newfound pivot, Fortune reincorporated as Tigera Group in July 1987. Campbell exited Tigera a month later, with Isaac Gilinski named as his successor. Campbell sued Tigera for re-entry to the company's board of directors in 1988.

Several of Fortune's former distributors filed a lawsuit in the Sacramento County Superior Court against Tigera Group in September 1987, seeking $39 million in punitive damages. This was days after Tigera (née Fortune) had paid out $12 million to investors who had filed a class-action lawsuit against Fortune, claiming that the company made false or misleading statements on the prospectus of their IPO in order to inflate their stock price.

In October 1988, Tigera sold their software business to Wang Laboratories of Lowell, Massachusetts. With no remaining intellectual property or manufacturing presence, Tigera became a holding company. For many years after, the company lay largely dormant and traded as a penny stock. In September 1996, by which point the company had relocated to New York City, Tigera changed its name again to Connectivity Technologies, Inc., after having acquired Connectivity Products of Leominster, Massachusetts, and changing its industry to selling wire and cable for the IT industry. Connectivity Technologies continued in this capacity until 2010, when it was merged into Methode Electronics's Data Solutions division; Methode of Chicago had purchased Connectivity Technologies some years prior to this.
