= Central Museum =

Central Museum may refer to:

- Nanjing Museum, formerly National Central Museum, China
- Centraal Museum, Utrecht, Netherlands
- Central State Museum of Kazakhstan
- Indore Museum or Central Museum, India
- Nagpur Central Museum, India
- Southend Central Museum, England
- Central Museum, Peru
