= Seminario de Lima =

Seminary in Peru

Coordinates: 12.0835°S 77.0679°W

Seminary of Saint Turibius
- Seminario de Santo Toribio
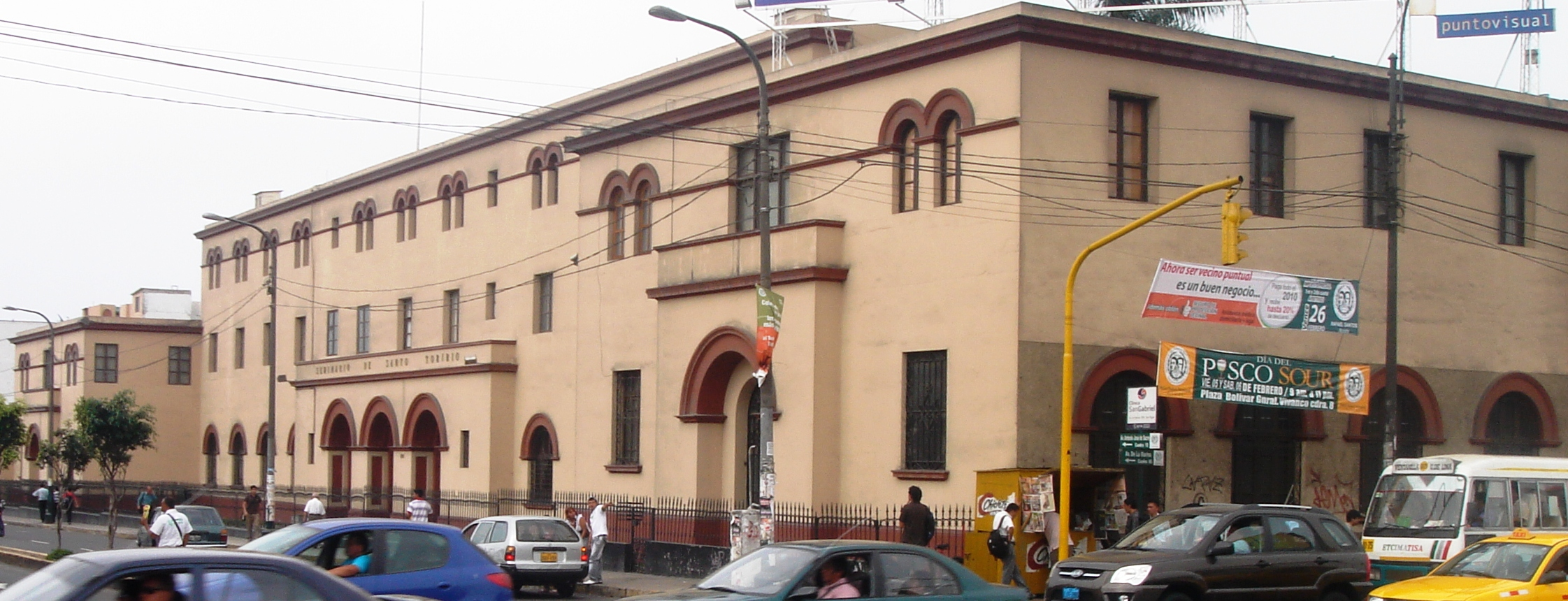
- Building in Pueblo Libre
- Type: Seminary
- Established: December 7, 1591
- Founder: Turibius of Mogrovejo
- Religious affiliation: Catholicism
- Rector: Presbyter Luis Sarmiento
- Location: Avenida Sucre 1200, Pueblo Libre
- Website: www.seminariodelima.pe

The Seminary of Saint Turibius (Spanish: Seminario de Santo Toribio), also known as the Seminary of Lima or (Spanish: Seminario de Lima), is a priestly seminary in charge of training seminarians to be future priests of the Roman Catholic Archdiocese of Lima. It is based in Lima, Peru, and is the second oldest seminary in the Americas after that of Bogotá, having been founded on December 7, 1591, by then Archbishop Turibius of Mongrovejo.

It includes several structures, including several chapels (those of the Seminar, San José, Saint John Maria Vianney, and the central chapel), as well as several libraries including one for history, philosophy and theology. It is under the jurisdiction of the Archbishop of Lima. Its rector is Presbyter Luis Sarmiento.

== History ==
The seminary was founded on December 7, 1591, by Archbishop Toribio de Mogrovejo seeking to instruct future priests of Lima. In accordance with the canons of the time, it was given the name of the Saint whose name the founder of the school was named: Turibius of Astorga. The street where the first 509.02 m^{2} building was located (2nd block of Jirón Lampa) was named after the seminary, one block behind the Archbishop's Palace and the Cathedral of Lima, and three blocks from where the Royal and Pontifical University of San Marcos was located, with which it always maintained close ties. It additionally owned the Edificio Santo Toribio, located at the intersection of Huancavelica and Rufino Torrico streets. The first rector of the Seminary College was Hernando de Guzmán, who in 1608-1609 and in 1624-1625 was rector of San Marcos. In 1592 the college obtained the royal patronage.

The Lima earthquake of November 13, 1655 destroyed a large part of the school. It was thus temporarily moved to the street next to the San Bartolomé Hospital (approximately at the height of San Joaquín Street, 2nd block of Jirón Cangallo).

On June 28, 1679 (73 years after the death of the founding archbishop of the Seminary) Pope Innocent XI, through the Laudeamus Bulla, proclaimed the beatification of Toribio de Mogrovejo. As a consequence, the Seminary College took his name. Later the Seminary returned to occupy its original space, on Santo Toribio Street. Toribio de Mogrovejo was canonized on December 10, 1726, by Pope Benedict XIII, through the Quoniam Spiritus Bull. As a consequence, the Seminary took its original name again, but this time in dedication to its founder, now a saint, and no longer Toribio de Astorga.

In 1813, Archbishop Bartolomé María de las Heras, wishing to give the Seminary the extension it lacked to comfortably contain a greater number of students and establish the same curriculum adopted at the Convictorio de San Carlos, bought the house next to it with his own income and expanded the building, commissioning the work to the priest Matías Maestro.

Towards the middle of the 19th century, Archbishop Francisco Xavier de Luna Pizarro carried out a profound reform of the curriculum and the financial system and moved the Seminary to the cloisters of San Francisco Solano and San Buenaventura within the convent of San Francisco. In the middle of the 20th century, for the widening of the Abancay street, these cloisters were cut and the Seminary moved to its new location in the district of Magdalena Vieja. The insignia of the school were: a brown mantle and a blue scholarship with the royal arms.

== See also ==
- Metropolitan Cathedral of Lima
