= Panama Pacifico =

Panama Pacifico Howard Air Force Base Panamá Pacífico International Airport
- Location in Panama
- Coordinates: 08°54′54″N 079°35′58″W
- Country: Panama
- Province: West Panamá Province
- District: Arraiján District
- Construction started: November 13, 2008

Area
  - Total: 141 km^{2} (54 sq mi)

Panama Pacifico is a mixed-use real estate development in Veracruz, Arraiján District, Panama, located on the site of the former Howard Air Force Base (now Panamá Pacífico International Airport). Panama Pacifico is located 30 minutes from downtown Panama City, 45 minutes from Tocumen International Airport, and adjacent to the Pan-American Highway that connects the Americas.

London & Regional Properties and Colombian banker Jaime Gilinski formed a consortium to develop the Panama Pacifico business and residential community. The contract is a 40-year license for the area with an obligation to invest US$405 million over the first eight years from 2007. The development covers 3,450 acres (1,400 hectares) of land.

== Development goals ==
The government of Panama created the Panama Pacifico Special Economic Area under Law 41 of July 20, 2004, and with that as a base, the Agency of Special Economic Area Panama Pacifico (APP) was created, acting as an independent entity for the administration, promotion, development, regulation, and proper use of the areas assigned to the Panama Pacifico region. The development goals set by the Panama Pacifico Agency (APP), at the start of the project, were:

- 1,400 hectares in total
- 850 hectares for development
- 1.0 million m^{2} of commercial space
- 20,000 homes and apartments
- 40,000 jobs created
- Extensive parks, open spaces, and entertainment areas
- Malls
- Business and luxury hotels

== Housing ==
The Panama Pacifico master-planned community will feature 20,000 homes in several neighborhoods: the Town Center (which includes current projects in Soleo, Mosaic, Nativa, Cëntriqo and River Valley), Woodlands, Kobbe Hills, and Puente Verde, among others. A downtown district, Town Center, will serve as a central point for retail, restaurant, and entertainment activities surrounded by the natural environment of mangroves, wetlands, and tropical forests.

== Economic potential ==
Companies that are set up within the area enjoy special tax, labor, and legal incentives. Many international companies are located in the heart of the Business Center while others have their own offices and buildings in the SEZ. More than 345 companies operate in the Special Economic Zone of Panama Pacifico. Several multinational corporations have already been located in Panama Pacifico, including 3M, DELL, VF, BASF, Samtec, and Caterpillar.

By the end of 2024, the development is set to finish the construction of the town center, Cëntriqo. This new development offers all type of amenities for students and families. The city plaza hosts businesses like Starbucks, Felipe Motta, Pink Buddha, and others. The developer has invested $700 million by 2021, international firms as well—particularly those involved in the maritime, light manufacturing, and technology sectors—continue to find Panama Pacifico an attractive option for their Latin American operations. More than 345 companies are now in operation in the Special Economic Area, including eight on the Fortune 500.

== Education ==
Panama Pacifico hosts several educational institutions, including:

- Lycée français Paul Gauguin de Panama, a private international school offering Pre-K through 12th grade. Classes are primarily in French, with both English and Spanish as second languages.
- The Renaissance Academy of International Learning (TRAIL), a private school for children from pre-K through 12th grade. Classes are in English.
- Howard Kids Academy is a private school with preschool through 8th grade, including classes in English as a Second Language (ESL).
- Magen David Academy, a private school for children of the Jewish faith, offers pre-K through 12th grade. Classes are in English.
- Universidad del Caribe, a four-year college. Classes are in Spanish.
- Universidad Tecnológica de Panamá, a four-year college. Classes are in Spanish.

== BLB Airport ==
There is also an airport.

== See also ==
- List of former United States military installations in Panama
