= Jirón Lampa =

Street in Lima, Peru

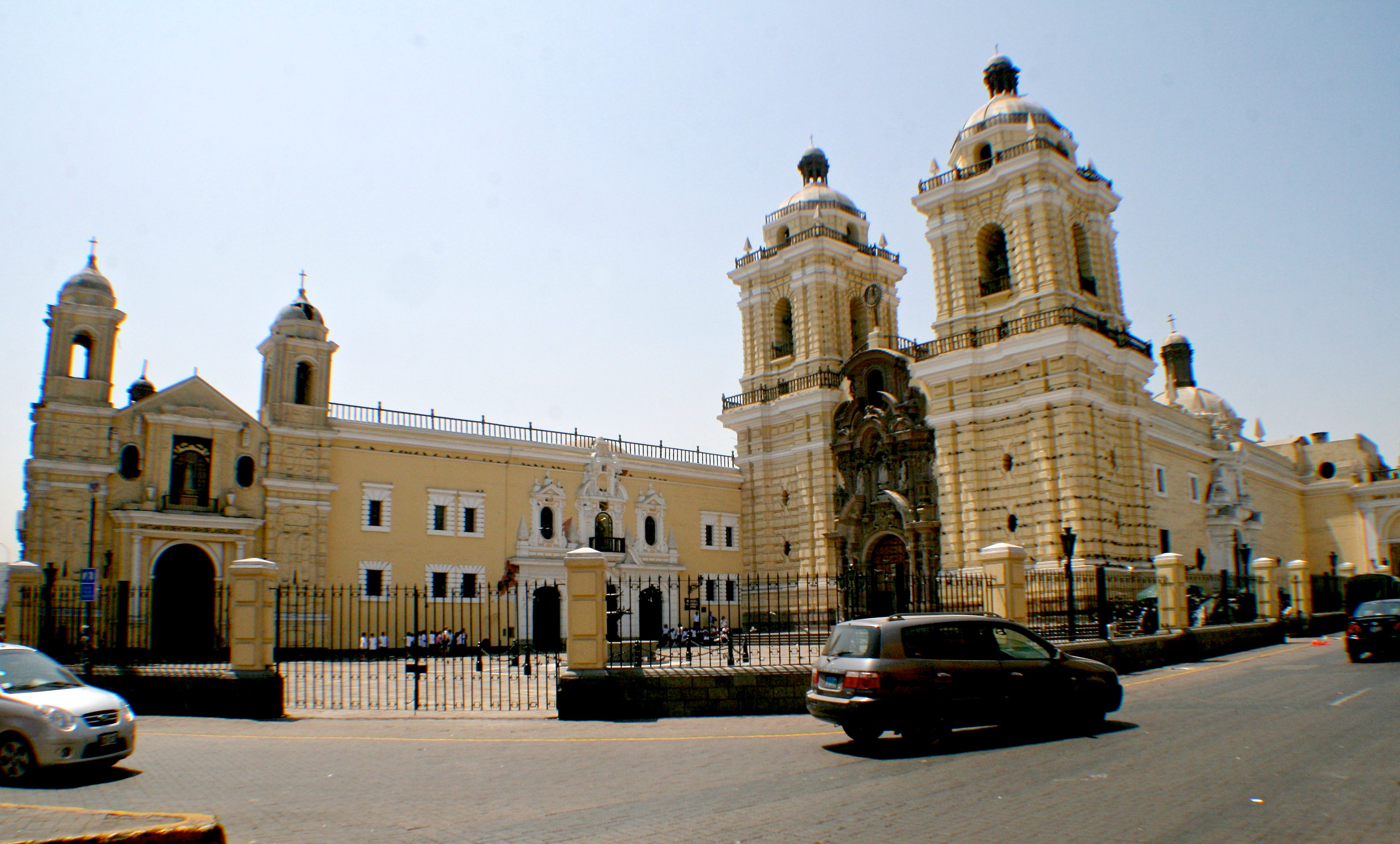
- Basilica and Convent of San Francisco and Jirón Áncash, seen from Jr. Lampa
- Part of: Damero de Pizarro
- Namesake: Lampa Province
- From: Jirón Amazonas
- Major junctions: See list: Jirón Áncash; Jirón Junín; Jirón Huallaga; Jirón Ucayali; Jirón Santa Rosa; Jirón Cuzco; Jirón Puno; Jirón Apurímac; Colmena Avenue; Jirón Lino Cornejo; Jirón Pachitea; Roosevelt Avenue
- To: Paseo de la República

Construction
- Completed: 1535

Lampa Street (Spanish: Jirón Lampa) is a major street in the Damero de Pizarro, an area of the historic centre of Lima, Peru. The street starts at its intersection with Amazonas Street and continues until it reaches the Paseo de la República Avenue.

== Name ==
The street's name comes from the project that was ultimately adopted in 1862, which replaced the city's traditional names with names that reflected the country's political geography. The term jirón is a type of street, whose axis is formed from a variety of different, single-block streets. It is named after Lampa Province, located in Puno.

== History ==
The then-unnamed multi-street axis was laid by Francisco Pizarro when he founded the city of Lima on January 18, 1535. In 1862, the city adopted the naming project of Mariano Bolognesi, an idea first proposed by Manuel Atanasio Fuentes in 1857. This new street was named after Lampa Province.

The traditional Calle de la Soledad (its current first block) was known after the chapel of the same name, built during the latter half of the 16th century. It was rebuilt in 1672.

The traditional Calle de Santo Toribio (its current second block) was known after the seminary of the same name. At other points in time, it was known as "de Manzanilla" and "de Villarreal" after the surnames of local residents. It also took the name of "Pozuelo de San Francisco" prior to its definitive name.

The traditional Calle de Santa Apolonia (its current third block) was known after the chapel of the same name. This chapel of the Cathedral was acquired by captain Hernando de Santa Cruz y Padilla for his family (and himself), and put under the advocation of Saint Apollonia. His descent continued into that of the counts of San Juan de Lurigancho.

The traditional Calle de Carrera (its current fourth block) was known after a bakery owned by Pedro Carrera. In 1613, it was named after Álvaro Ruiz de Navamuel, a captain and government official who lived there, in what is today the Museum of the Central Reserve Bank of Peru. Prior to this name, it was named after Conquistador Pedro Ramírez de Uroz Navarro, who joined Hernando de Soto in Nicaragua for the Conquest of Peru. It was also named after Juan Velásquez de Ovando, the archdeacon of the Cathedral, and also after Álvaro de Ibarra, oidor of the Real Audiencia of Lima.

The traditional Calle de Picantería, later Banco del Herrador (its current fifth block) was known possibly after a food establishment of the same type. Juan de Arona wrote that a picante is a stew prepared locally, with a base composed almost entirely of pepper. The first name remained until the mid-19th century after the farriers who settled there. Two other streets also received the latter name.

The traditional Calle de San Antonio (its current sixth block) was erroneously known after the alleged residence of counts of San Antonio de Vistaalegre (in reality, this family lived between Melchormalo and Santa Apolonia streets). It was previously known after the Marquesses of Dragón de San Miguel de Híjar until the late 18th century. This family lived there, and their residence was inherited by the Counts of Villanueva del Soto.

The traditional Calle de Pileta de la Trinidad (its current seventh block) was known after the fountain of the same name that was used by the residents of the same street. In 1613, it was named after captain Jusepe de Ribera y Dávalos, the youngest son of Nicolás de Ribera.

The traditional Calle de Fano (its current eighth block) was known after a neighbour not conclusively identified, as several noteworthy candidates with the same name have been proposed by historians. Other residents of this street during the second half of the 19th century include oidor of Chuquisaca Manuel García de la Plata, and Domingo Larrión, archdeacon of the Cathedral. During the Republican era, writer Manuel Atanasio Fuentes also resided in this street, with his house serving as the place where the members of the wartime government of Francisco García Calderón met.

The traditional Calle de Pobres (its current ninth block) was known after its early inhabitants: people of low income. In 1613, it was simply called as the street behind the Monastery of the Incarnation, later demolished to make way for an avenue.

The traditional Calle de Cádices (its current tenth block) was known after the family of Miguel de Cádiz, who lived there. In 1613, it was named after a Pulpería.

The traditional Calle del Sauce (its current eleventh block) was known possibly after a willow located there. José Gálvez Barrenechea also wrote it was once known as "Trono" at one point. This name's origin was not sourced or explained by him, however.

=== Recent history ===
On July 28, 2000, amid the protests known as the Four Quarters March, a fire began inside the building of the Bank of the Nation, located in the intersection with La Colmena Avenue. Despite claims by Minister of the Interior Walter Chacón of the opposite, the fire was caused by an explosion on the building's third floor which caused the structural integrity of the building's lower floors to be compromised, causing them to collapse and worsen the gravity of the situation. As a result, 6 security guards were killed in fire.

== Route ==
The street begins next to the Basilica and Convent of San Francisco, near the Parque de la Muralla. Its southwestern side is the site of the Casa de las Trece Puertas, a building whose name comes from the number of doors it has, a total of thirteen. It originally had nine doors when it was built during the 17th century, eventually growing due to the number of businesses housed in the building. Destroyed during the 1746 earthquake, the current building was built in the Rococo style between 1864 and 1872, acquired by the Provincial Council of Lima in 1975 and ultimately restored from 2007 to 2009.

The street's second block's northeast corner is the site of the Finca Piaggio, formerly the site of the seminary that gave the street its name. During the 18th century, it was sold by Fernando Muchotrigo, its chaplain, to José de Cárdenas. A pulpería functioned on the site until the early 19th century, as did a diplomatic mission of Colombia. The building of the Ministry of Economy and Finance is located to the south, on the opposite corner.

The street's third block houses a mixed-use building on its northwest corner, first owned by Juana Navios Boloña y Espinola during the mid-18th century. To the south of this building is the Metropolitan Cathedral of Lima's posterior entrance.

The street's fourth block has three buildings on its eastern side built for the Banco de Crédito del Perú, formerly the Banco Italiano. The purchase of one of this buildings was authorised by the Congress of Peru to house its new offices. Its southwestern corner is the site of the Museum of the Central Reserve Bank of Peru since 1982, having previously served as the main office of the bank of the same name.

The street's fifth block is occupied by the building of the Ministry of Foreign Affairs in most of its eastern side, with its southern corner housing a building of the Public Ministry of Peru. Opposite the latter is the Casa Grace, named after the company that signed the contract of the same name with the Peruvian government in 1886.

The street's sixth block prominently features the buildings of El Comercio Group. Its southwestern corner is the side entrance of the former headquarters of the Banco Wiese. Blocks seven to eleven house a large number of commercial establishments, as well as the route of the Metropolitano bus system.

The street's final block (Note: The street's current twelfth and final block has no traditional name.) houses the Edificio República on its western side. Built during the 1940s, it was the first building of its kind to be built in Lima. When it first opened, its first floor was occupied by shops, the second to fifth floor by offices, and the final three floors by apartments. Its air conditioning system was manufactured by Carrier Corporation and installed by Pedro Martinto, S.A. Until 1974, it housed the embassy of the United Kingdom on its fifth floor. Qantua Centro Capital, a mixed housing and commercial development that began in January 2025, is located on the block's eastern side.

== Transportation ==
The avenue allows for regular vehicular transit in its entirety. From its seventh block onwards, two lanes are reserved for the city's bus service.

=== Bus service ===
The street is serviced by the Metropolitano bus system, which operates its Route E since January 2023. This route passes through the street's seventh block onwards, continuing until it reaches the Central Station under the Promenade of the Naval Heroes.

== See also ==
- Historic Centre of Lima
- Lima District
