= Jirón Amazonas =

Street in Lima, Peru

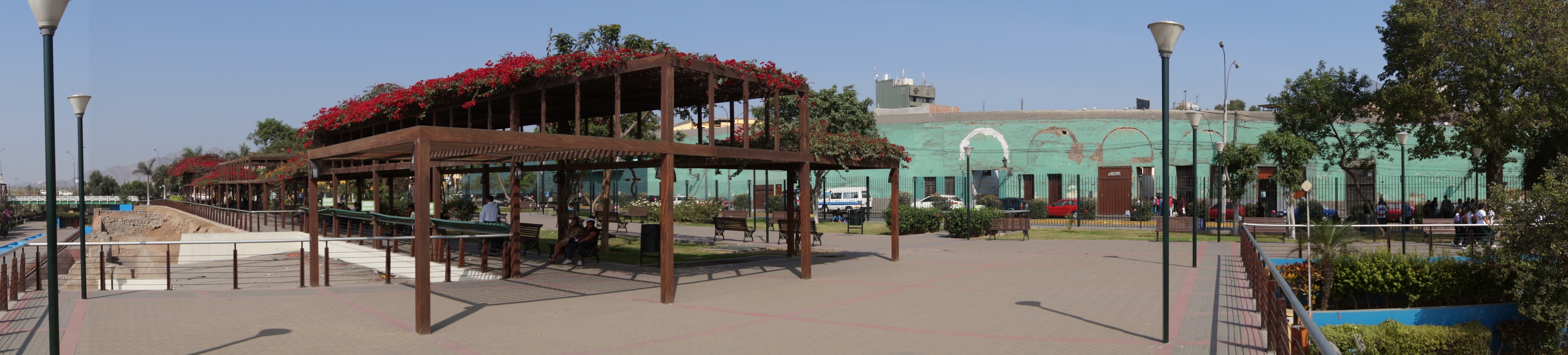
- The street and convent as seen from the Parque de la Muralla
- Part of: Damero de Pizarro
- Namesake: Department of Amazonas
- From: Jirón Lampa
- To: Avenida Sebastián Lorente

Construction
- Completion: 1535

Jirón Amazonas is a major street in the Damero de Pizarro, located in the historic centre of Lima, Peru. The street starts at its intersection with the Jirón Lampa and continues until it reaches Sebastián Lorente Avenue.

== History ==
The road that today constitutes the jirón was laid by Francisco Pizarro when he founded the city of Lima on January 18, 1535. This street was located parallel to the bed of the Rímac River and was the first of the others, so in some passages, its northern side was delimited by the small gorges or ravines that led to that riverbed (currently space has been gained for the bed). In the 18th century, the first tobacco shop was established on the second block of this road. Likewise, in the parts that were not adjacent to the ravine, sections of the Walls of Lima were built.

In 1862, when the new urban nomenclature was adopted, the road was named Jirón Amazonas, after the northern department of Amazonas. Prior to this renaming, the each block (cuadra) had a unique name:

- Block 1: Callejón de San Francisco, for its location behind the Convent of San Francisco.
- Block 2: Barranqueta, because it was located where a small ravine that overlooked the bed of the Rímac River once began.
- Block 3: Viterbo, after a women's retreat establishment called Santa Rosa de Viterbo (after the Italian city) founded in 1680 under the protection of the Franciscan Order.
- Block 4: Barranca, for the same reason as block 2.
- Block 5: Manzanilla, after some unidentified neighbor. However, during the viceregal era, this street was known as Estanque viejo or Siete pecados, because one of the first ponds that served the eastern part of the city was built there and because of the existence of various clubs, respectively.
- Block 6: Martinete, because of the existence on that street of a gunpowder mill of that type. Later, Viceroy Abascal ordered that the mill be moved and established a grain mill which was called Molino del Medio. However, the name stuck.

In the intersection with the Balta bridge, the now disappeared Plazuela de Viterbo stood out. This geographical space was of importance for the capital, until the beginning of the 1970s when it disappeared and began to be absorbed by the modernity of the city. It had stood out not only for being the entrance to the Cercado de Lima, arriving from the Plaza de Acho, but because in its surroundings were located: the Cinelandia cinema, a tram stop and, a few meters away, what was also the Train Station from Lima to Lurín (existing between 1913 and 1964). At the beginning of the 1970s, the municipality of Lima embarked on an (unfinished) plan to modernize this part of the city. Cinelandia was demolished in 1973 and around that time what was the Lima Lurín Station was also demolished. Currently, in almost all of that part of the jirón (Barrios Altos) there are used book dealers, who form an entire fair.

== See also ==
- Historic Centre of Lima
