= Jack Schofield (journalist) =

British technology journalist (1947–2020)

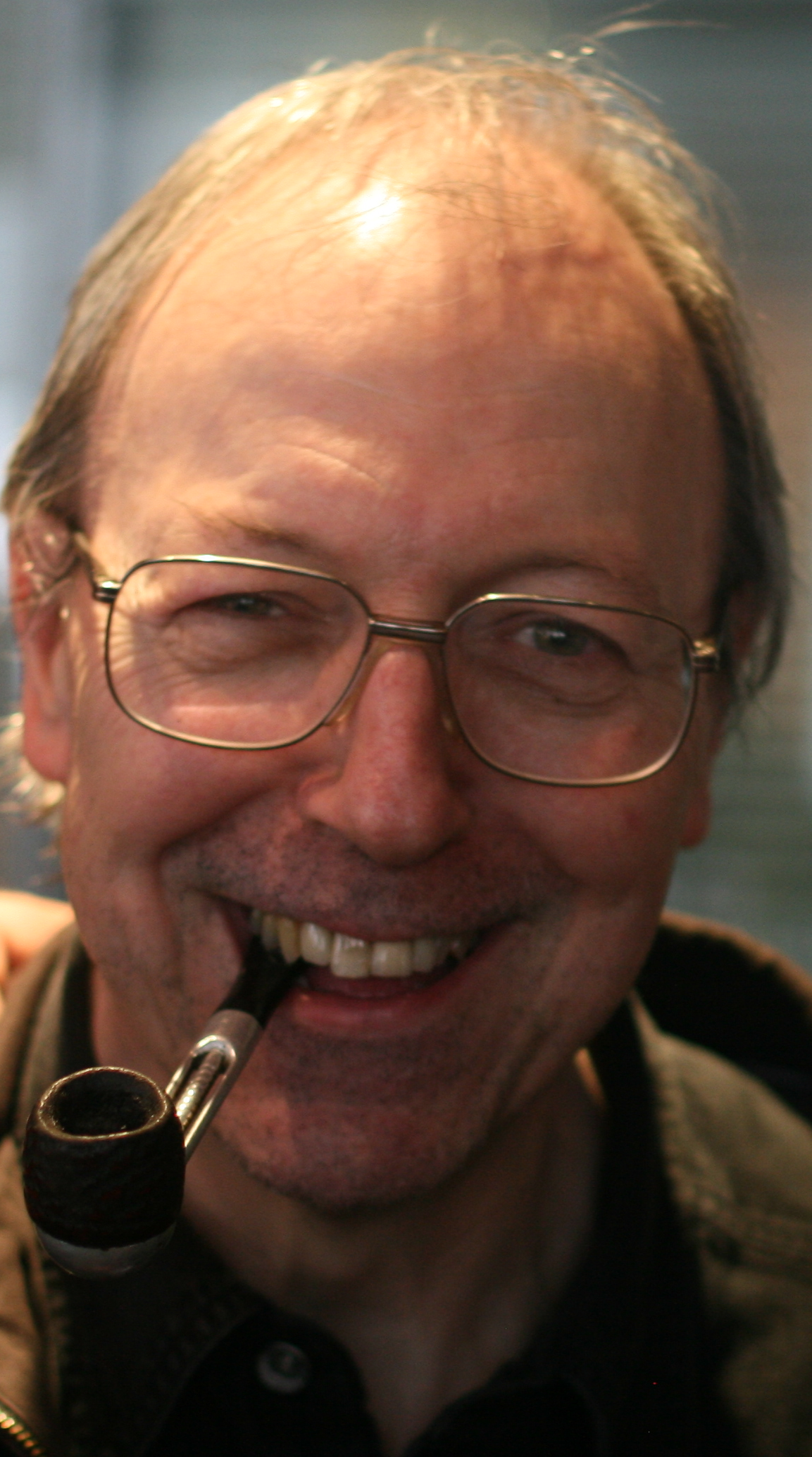
- Schofield in 2009
- Born: 30 October 1947
- Died: 31 March 2020 (aged 72)
- Occupation: Journalist
- Schofield's voice recorded in November 2012

Jack Schofield (30 October 1947 – 31 March 2020) was a British technology journalist. He wrote the Ask Jack column for The Guardian and preceding that covered technology for the newspaper from 1983 to 2010. He edited photography and computing periodicals and produced a number of books on photography and on computing, including The Darkroom Book (1981).

He died on 31 March 2020 at the age of 72, following a heart attack on 27 March.

== Career ==
Schofield edited various photography magazines during the 1970s: Photo Technique, Film Making, You & Your Camera (a partwork), and Zoom as well as the journal of the Royal Photographic Society, The Photographic Journal.

In 1983, he started writing a weekly computer column in Futures Micro Guardian, from its first issue, in The Guardian. He also became editor of the monthly Practical Computing in 1984. In September 1985 he joined The Guardian's staff to launch Computer Guardian, the newspaper's weekly computer supplement. He continued to cover technology for The Guardian until 2010 when he switched to solely writing the newspaper's Ask Jack column.

Schofield also wrote on computing for Reuters and blogged for ZDNet. He produced a number of books on photography and on computing.

Whilst working for The Guardian, Schofield published what he referred to as his Laws of Computing which sought to help people understand the consequences of decisions about their data:

1. Never put data into a program unless you can see exactly how to get it out
2. Data doesn't really exist unless you have two copies of it
3. The easier it is for you to access your data, the easier it is for someone else to access your data

== Publications ==
- The Darkroom Book: the comprehensive step-by-step guide to processing your colour or black-and-white photographs. Schofield was consulting editor.
  - London: Spring, 1981, 1982. Feltham, UK: Newnes, 1983. ISBN 9780600353997.
  - New York: Ziff Davis, 1981. ISBN 9780871651068.
  - New York: Amphoto, 1981, 1985, 1987, 1988. ISBN 9780817437572.
- Photographing People. Littlehampton Book Services, 1982. ISBN 978-0600384731.
- Nude and Glamour Photography. You & Your Camera Photography Series. Glasgow: Collins, 1981, 1982. Schofield was consultant editor. ISBN 978-0004116396.
- How Famous Photographers Work. New York: Amphoto, 1983. Edited by Schofield. ISBN 9780817440022.
- Improve Your Camera Techniques. Feltham, UK: Newnes, 1985. Edited by Schofield. ISBN 9780600332657.
- The Guardian Guide to Microcomputing. Oxford, UK; New York: Blackwell, 1985. Hardback, ISBN 978-0631143031. Paperback, ISBN 9780631143048. "A selection of the author's columns from the MicroFutures page of the Guardian, rewritten and revised".
- The Hutchinson Dictionary of Computing, Multimedia, and the Internet. By Schofield, Wendy M. Grossman and David Goul. Oxford, UK: Helicon, 1996, 1997. ISBN 978-1859861592.
