= Francis Solanus =

Spanish Franciscan friar and saint

Saint Francis Solanus OFM
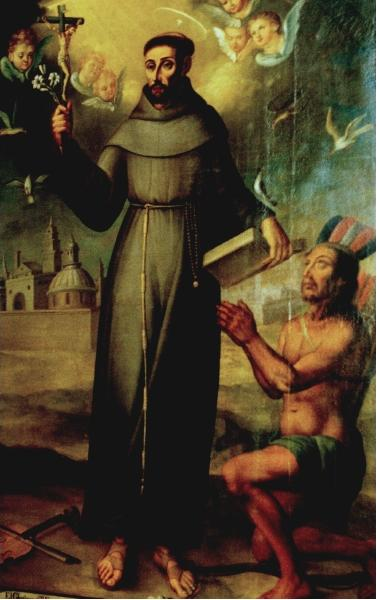
- St. Francisco Solano with a native of Tucuman (Anonymous, c. 1588)

Missionary
- Born: 10 March 1549; Montilla, Córdoba, Spanish Empire
- Died: 14 July 1610; Lima, Viceroyalty of Peru, Spanish Empire
- Venerated in: Roman Catholic Church
- Beatified: 20 June 1675, Rome, Papal States by Pope Clement X
- Canonized: 27 December 1726, Rome, Papal States by Pope Benedict XIII
- Major shrine: Monastery of San Francisco, Lima, Peru
- Feast: 14 July
- Attributes: Franciscan habit, violin
- Patronage: Argentina; Bolivia; Chile; Paraguay; Peru; also against earthquakes

Francis Solanus, OFM (born Francisco Solano y Jiménez, 10 March 1549 – 14 July 1610) was a Spanish Franciscan friar and missionary in South America. He was canonized in 1726.

== Early life ==
Solanus was born 10 March 1549 in Montilla, Spain, the third child of Mateo Sánchez Solano and Ana Jiménez. He was educated by the Jesuits, but felt drawn to the poverty and penitential life of the Franciscan friars. At the age of twenty, he joined the Order of Friars Minor at Montilla, entering the novitiate at St. Lawrence Friary. The community there belonged to the reformed observance within the order, following a strict routine of prayer, silence and fasting. Francis followed the rule rigorously, always going barefoot, abstaining from meat, and wearing a hairshirt throughout that entire year. As a result, however, his health was permanently affected, leaving him sick and fatigued.

Solano made his solemn vows in 1569. He was then sent to the friary of Our Lady of Loreto in Seville for his seminary studies. There he learned not only philosophy and theology but developed his musical talents. He was ordained in 1576, a ceremony his mother was unable to attend due to her poor health. He was then named master of ceremonies for the community. Still a lover of simplicity, Francis made a small cell for himself by the chapel of the friary, made of clay and reeds.

After completing his final theological studies, Solano was assigned as an itinerant preacher to the surrounding villages of the region. He was eventually given a license as a confessor. During this time and with the hope of achieving martyrdom for preaching the Catholic faith, he requested that he might be allowed to go to North Africa. He was denied this request. At that point, Solano shifted his vision to the American missions.

After the death of his father, Solano returned to his hometown of Montilla to care for his mother. During that time, he gained the reputation of a wonderworker, as a number of people were cured of their afflictions through his intercession. In 1583, a pestilence having broken out at Granada, he tended the sick and dying.

== New World ==
Spanish king Philip II requested the Franciscans to send missionaries to preach the gospel in the Americas. In 1589, Solanus sailed from Spain to the New World, and having landed at Panama, crossed the isthmus and embarked on a vessel that was to convey him to Peru. During the journey, a storm at sea crashed his ship against the rocks not far from Peru. The crew and the passengers abandoned the ship, but Francis stayed with the slaves that were on board. After three days, they were rescued.

For twenty years Solano worked at evangelizing the vast regions of Tucuman (present-day northwestern Argentina) and Paraguay. He had a skill for languages and succeeded at learning many of the regions' native tongues in a fairly short period. The Catholic Encyclopedia states he could also address tribes of different tongues in one language yet be understood by them all. Being a musician as well, Solano also played the violin frequently for the natives. He is often depicted playing this instrument.

After that came Solano's appointment as guardian of the Franciscan friary in Lima, Peru. Further, he filled the same office for the Franciscan friaries in Tucuman and Paraguay.

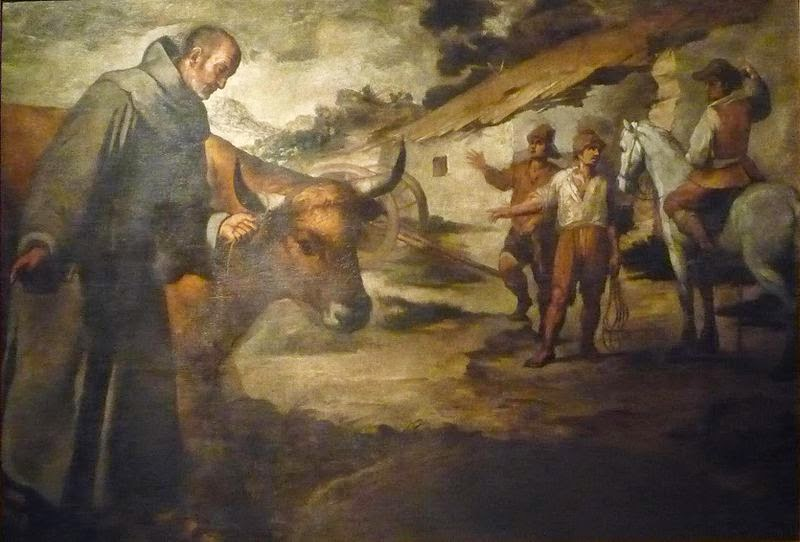
Saint Francisco Solano and the bull, by Murillo

Around 1601 he was called to Lima, Peru, where he tried to recall the Spanish colonists to their baptismal integrity. In 1610, while preaching at Trujillo he foretold the calamities that were to befall that city, which was destroyed by an earthquake eight years later. He died at Lima in 1610.

== Veneration ==
Solanus was beatified by Pope Clement X in 1675, and canonized by Pope Benedict XIII in 1726. His feast is on 14 July.

Francis Solanus is the patron saint of Montilla. The Parish Church of San Francisco Solano is built on the site of the former house where he was born. He is also patron of Argentina, Bolivia, Chile, Paraguay and Peru.

== Legacy ==
Mission San Francisco Solano, the northernmost mission along California's El Camino Real, was named in 1823 for Francisco Solano.

In Humahuaca, every day at noon, on the city hall belltower, heavy copper doors slowly open and a life-sized animated wooden statue of San Francisco Solano appears for about two minutes and seems to bless the silent crowd amassed on the village plaza.
