= Jaime Gilinski Bacal =

Colombian banker and real estate developer

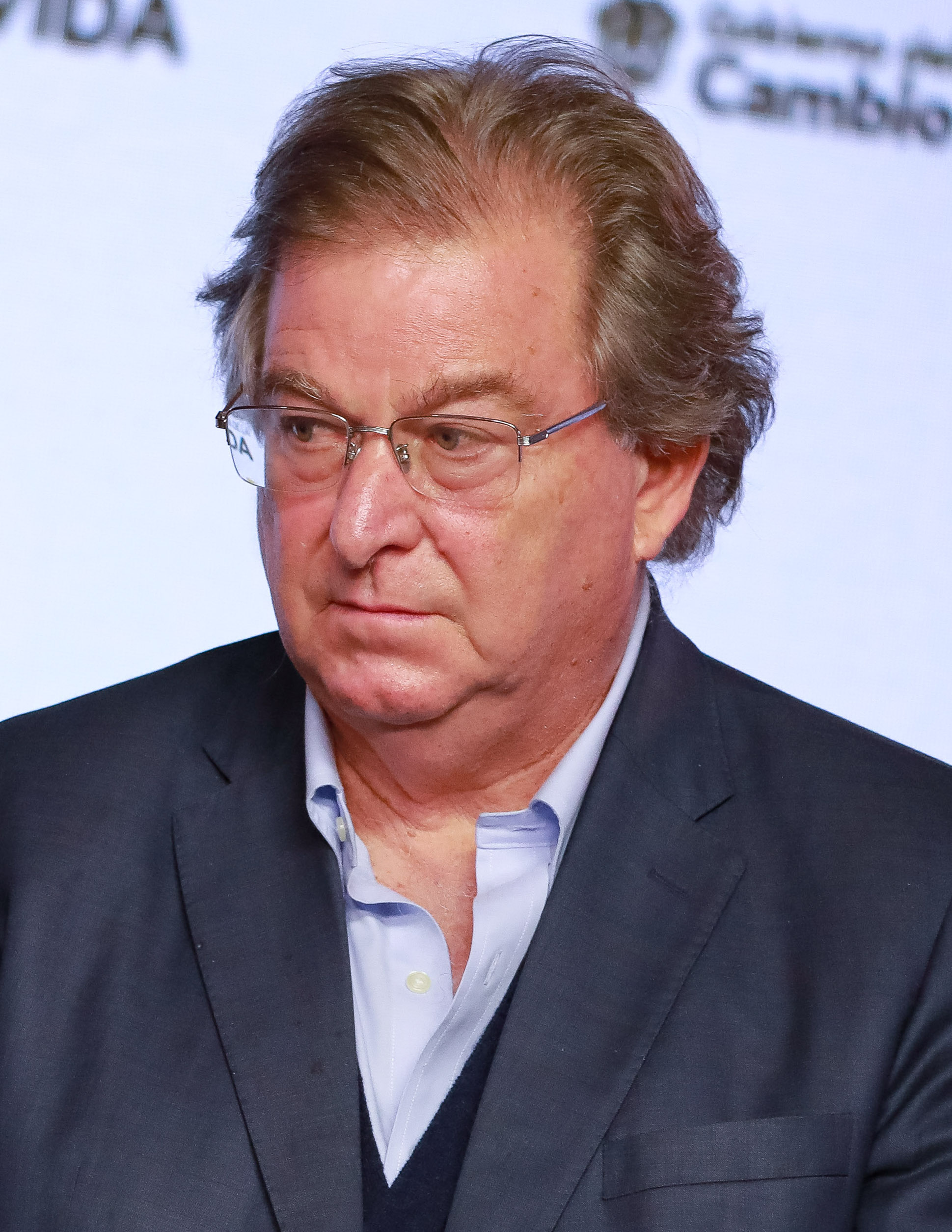
- Gilinski in 2024
- Born: 14 December 1957 (age 68); Cali, Colombia
- Education: Georgia Tech; Harvard Business School
- Occupation: Banker
- Spouse: Raquel Gilinski
- Children: 4
- Parent(s): Isaac Gilinski Sragowicz; Perla Gilinski

Jaime Gilinski Bacal (born 14 December 1957, in Cali, Colombia) is a Panama-based Colombian banker, investor, and real estate developer. According to Forbes, he is the richest person in Colombia, with a net worth of US$15.1 billion as of 2026.

== Early life ==
He is the son of Isaac Gilinski Sragowicz, a banker and himself the son of Lithuanian Jewish immigrants.

Gilinski earned his BS in Industrial Engineering from Georgia Tech in 1978, and an MBA from Harvard Business School in 1980.

== Banking and investments ==
In the 1990s, Gilinski acquired the Colombian assets of BCCI (Bank of Credit and Commerce International) for a nominal sum after its global collapse. Renamed Banco Andino, it became one of the most efficient banks in the Colombian banking system within four years. The Gilinski Group sold the reconstituted bank for a reported $70 million.

The family then moved to purchase Banco de Colombia for $365 million, in what was then the largest privatization in Colombia's history. A group of premier private equity investors led by Morgan Stanley Asset Management investing $65 million, billionaire George Soros investing $50 million and Tiger Management with $35 million together with more than 100 other European and North American institutional investors co-invested with Gilinski. Later, the family sold control of the bank to Banco Industrial Colombiano, and its controlling stakeholder Sindicato Antioqueño, in a deal valued at $800 million, among Colombia's largest deals. Gilinski received $418 million for its stake and retained a minority position in the new bank as part of the deal. As of 2018, Bancolombia was the largest in Colombia with a market capitalization of $11 billion on the NYSE.

In 2003, Gilinski acquired and subsequently merged Banco Sudameris and Banco Tequendama. This merger created GNB Sudameris, a bank with assets of over US$16 billion that ranks among the largest private Colombian banks as of 2018. The purchase of Servibanca, an ATM network with over 2,600 machines, and Suma Valores, a stock exchange commission agent company, has further expanded the network.

In May 2012, HSBC announced the sale of its Latin American operations (Colombia, Peru, Paraguay) to Banco GNB Sudameris for $400 million in cash.

In September 2013, Banco Sabadell announced that Gilinski became its largest shareholder as the anchor investor in a US$1.8 billion capital raise. Through the ABB and share rights issue, Gilinski's investment totals approximately $500 million. Banco Sabadell is the 5th largest bank in Spain, with over US$220 billion in assets and a 13% market share.

The Gilinski group also owns Yupi, a snack food company in Latin America, and exports to nine countries. Gilinski Group also owns Rimax Plastics, which was founded by his father Isaac Gilinski.

In December 2019, Gilinski became the largest shareholder of Metro Bank, after upping his interest in the business to 6.1%. In May 2020, he increased his stake to 9%. Gilinski holds his stake through British Virgin Islands-based Spaldy Investments.

In November 2021, Gilinski in partnership with Abu Dhabi launched a takeover bid for control of Grupo Nutresa, one the largest food processing companies in Latin America. Shortly after, Gilinski launched a public tender offer to acquire up to 31.5% of Grupo Sura, one of the largest financial conglomerates in Latin America. After 9 tender offers and 18 months, Gilinski and GEA management reached and agreement that Gilinski and his partners would take at least 87% of Grupo Nutresa in exchange for his shares in Grupo Sura. In a tender offer finalized in April 2024, Gilinski and his partners reached 99.38% ownership in Nutresa. As of 2024, the market capitalization of Grupo Nutresa is US$14 billion. GEA is a group of management controlled companies with an interlocking share structure. The structure was created in 1978 to prevent hostile takeovers and are collectively known as GEA. The three main companies are Grupo Sura, Grupo Nutresa, and Grupo Argos and together comprise 8% of Colombia's GDP.

In October 2023, he became the controlling shareholder of Metro Bank with around a 53% stake.

== Real estate ==
In partnership with London & Regional Properties, Gilinski has developed the Panama Pacifico business and residential development in Veracruz, adjoining Panama City. Jaime Gilinski and his partners Ian and Richard Livingstone beat 16 other international firms in a competition to develop the project. The project, based on the former Howard Air Force Base in Panama, includes 2,750 acres (11.1 km^{2}) of land, which makes it one of the largest development projects in the world.

== Philanthropy ==
In the 1990s, the Gilinskis contributed US$8 million to the Fundacion Santa Fe. This was during Jaime Gilinski's time as chairman of Banco de Colombia. La Fundación Santa Fe de Bogotá supports Santa Fe Hospital in Bogotá. Founded in 1972, this hospital is recognized as Colombia's most technologically advanced.

Gilinski is the chair of Capital Projects for The Chabad House at Harvard University. The Chabad House at Harvard is a Jewish student organization that provides educational, social, and recreational programming for students and faculty. Through the Jaime and Raquel Gilinski Endowment, Gilinski supports the David Rockefeller Center for Latin American Studies at Harvard University.

Jaime and Raquel Gilinski have also established the Jaime and Raquel Gilinski Fellowship at Harvard Business School, awarded to MBA students from Colombia and Panama, with a secondary preference for students from other Latin American countries.

In 2022, the Mount Sinai Health System received a multimillion-dollar commitment from Raquel and Jaime Gilinski for the Department of Obstetrics, Gynecology, and Reproductive Science at The Mount Sinai Hospital. This gift will establish the Raquel and Jaime Gilinski Department of Obstetrics, Gynecology and Reproductive Science at Mount Sinai. The new gift will support capital projects and renovations to elevate care and services in women's health at The Mount Sinai Hospital.

In June 2026, he donated $18,000 to help rebuild the Jewish Community of Venezuela after the devastating earthquakes.

== Personal life ==
He is married to Raquel Gilinski. They have four children and live in Panama, He has further houses in Miami and Colombia.
