= Banco Wiese =

Peruvian bank

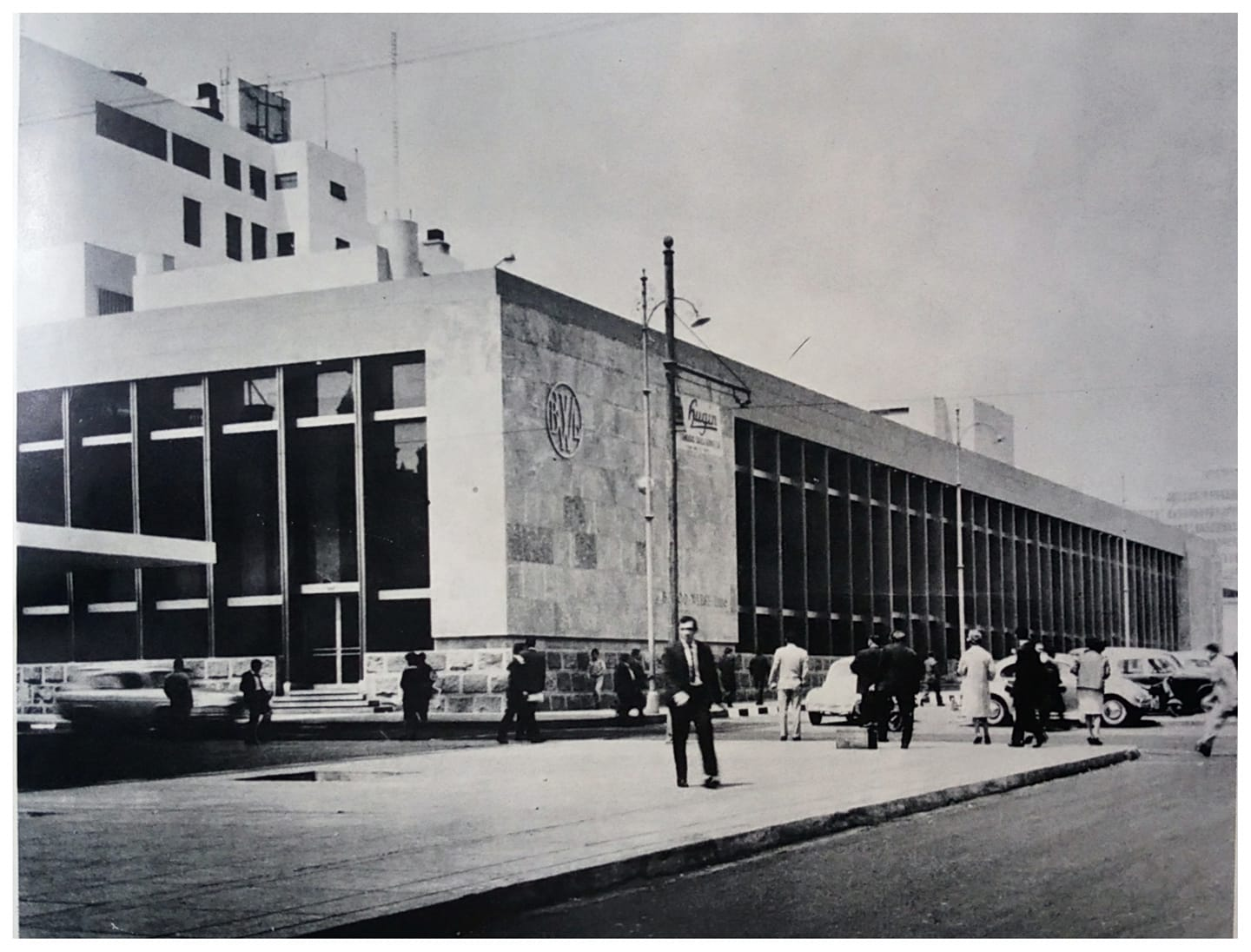
- Company type: Public
- Industry: Financial services
- Founded: March 1, 1943; 83 years ago in Lima, Peru
- Founder: Augusto Wiese Eslava
- Defunct: 2006
- Fate: Merged into Scotiabank
- Successor: Scotiabank Perú
- Headquarters: Lima, Peru

Banco Wiese, Ltdo., known as the Banco Wiese Sudameris (BWS) after 1997, was a Peruvian bank that existed between 1943 and 2006, when it was merged into Scotiabank's local branch, Scotiabank Perú.

== History ==
The bank was founded by a group of Peruvian businessmen, led by Augusto N. Wiese, on March 1, 1943. Its first headquarters was located in the Jirón Miró Quesada in downtown Lima and was part of the Wiese Group. It operated exclusively in the city of Lima until the 1990s when it began its decentralisation with the opening of branches in different cities of Peru, becoming considered the second bank in the Peruvian financial system. On December 6, 1963, it inaugurated its main headquarters on Emancipación Avenue between Lampa and Carabaya streets with the presence of the then President of Peru, Fernando Belaúnde Terry.

In 1994 it was the first Peruvian bank to list its shares on New York and London's stock exchanges. In 1998, the bank would merge with the Banco de Lima, itself related to Sudameris, whose formation was the ephemeral Banco Wiese Sudameris that disappeared in 2006. Prior to its disappearance, the bank developed the "Creceahorro" strategy in 2003, which generated controversy the following year due to the inclusion of clauses considered abusive.

Despite attempts to deny its bankruptcy, in 2005 Banco Wiese Sudameris was acquired by the Canadian Scotiabank and in 2006, both Banco Wiese and Banco Sudamericano (which had also been acquired by Scotiabank) were integrated under the corporate name Scotiabank Perú.

== See also ==
- Economy of Peru
