= Lycée français Paul Gauguin de Panama =

Lycée français International de Panama
- Liceo Francés Internacional de Panamá

Location
- Edificio 810, Ave. Ingeniero, Panamá Pacífico; Panama Pacifico; Panama
- Coordinates: 8.910670000000001°N 79.5888448°W

Information
- Type: International School
- Established: 1970
- Grades: K-12
- Enrollment: 750
- Website: https://lfpanama.edu.pa/?lang=fr

Lycée Français International de Panama (Spanish: Liceo Francés Internacional de Panamá) is a French international school in the Panama Pacifico development in Veracruz, Arraiján District, Panama. It serves infant school through the final year of senior high school.

== History ==
The school was founded in 1970.
