= Practical Computing =

Monthly UK computer magazine

- Practical Computing, November 1979
- Publisher: IPC Electrical Electronic Press Ltd
- First issue: August 1978
- Final issue: 1989
- Country: United Kingdom
- Based in: Sutton, Surrey

Practical Computing was a UK computer magazine published monthly. The magazine was published by IPC Electrical Electronic Press Ltd. The headquarters was in Sutton, Surrey. The first edition was released in August 1978 as a special computer show edition, and the second issue was October 1978. The magazine carried on to 1987 when it merged with Business Computing. In September 1989, it was renamed Management Computing.

It provided in-depth reviews and previews of the latest hardware and software for the information technology enthusiasts and professionals, initially providing a mix of articles aimed at hobbyists and at small business people, later focusing its attention increasingly exclusively on the business and professional market.

== Development and evolution ==
The magazine followed the trends of the microcomputer industry at the time. Initially it covered a broad range of systems including Commodore PETs and the Tandy TRS-80 as well as single-board computers such as the UK101 and Nascom 2. Later in its life it focussed more on business computers such as the ACT Sirius 1 and the IBM PC. Towards the end of its life, reflecting their dominance in the small computing marketplace, it covered the IBM PC and compatibles almost exclusively, with the occasional Apple Mac or small UNIX workstation piece.

The editors were:

- 1978 — Dennis Jarrett (main magazine), Nick Hampshire (Computabits)
- 1979-1983—Peter Laurie
- 1984 — Jack Schofield

The initial publisher in 1978 was Wim Hoeksma, who died in 1981. Chris Hipwell was its publisher in the early 1980s. Tom Maloney was advertising manager.

The cover price in 1978 was 50p; in June 1980 it rose to 60p, June 1981 80p, 1984 85p and 1985 £1.

Your Computer was a spin-off from Practical Computing.

== Concept and design ==
- The cover art was initially hand-drawn, later it went for occasional (but humorous) photographs, then finally a mix of photos and geometric graphic design.
- From October 1978 to October 1979 the magazine serialised the book Illustrating BASIC by Donald Alcock. This book was unusually written by hand rather than typeset, and featured little insects to show common programming errors or bugs.
- When it was more of a hobbyist magazine, Practical Computing published fiction—usually stories with a computing or science fiction slant. A noted series was Richard Forsyth's Son of Hexadecimal Kid, which ran from September 1980 to December 1981.
- The magazine underwent two redesigns in its history, in 1982 and 1985. In 1985 the title font changed, losing its trademark 'mu' symbol, and the subtitle 'for business and professional micro users' appeared.
