= Isaac Gilinski =

Colombian company founder

- Born: Colombia
- Education: Georgetown University
- Occupation: Businessperson
- Known for: Elliot wave

Isaac Gilinski is a Colombian-born business executive and theorist. He is the founder and chief executive officer of Brickell Analytics.

Gilinski is known for forecasting macro market trends using Fibonacci sequences and the Elliott wave principle, a method based on sentiment, wave counting, and contrarian technical analysis. His firm, Brickell Analytics, owns the registered trademark Rising Yield Deflation.

== Early life and education ==
Gilinski was born in Colombia. He graduated from Georgetown University. He is a relative of Jaime Gilinski Bacal.

== Career ==
Gilinski began his career in 2000 at Lehman Brothers. In 2001, he helped develop the Latin American subsidiary of Global Capital Management.

In 2002, Gilinski founded the Brickell Family Office. In 2011, he founded Brickell Analytics, a firm that provides macroeconomic research on global markets. In 2013, he forecasted a decline in the Australian dollar one month before George Soros shorted $1 billion of the currency. In May 2018, he forecasted a rise in the U.S. stock market ahead of a major recession. In January 2021, he forecasted a major decline in the U.S. financial markets coupled with a recession during the Biden presidency.
