= Basilica and Convent of San Francisco, Lima =

Cultural heritage site in Peru

Coordinates: 12°02′43.79″S 77°01′38.62″W

Basilica and Convent of Saint Francis
- Basílica y Convento de San Francisco (Spanish)
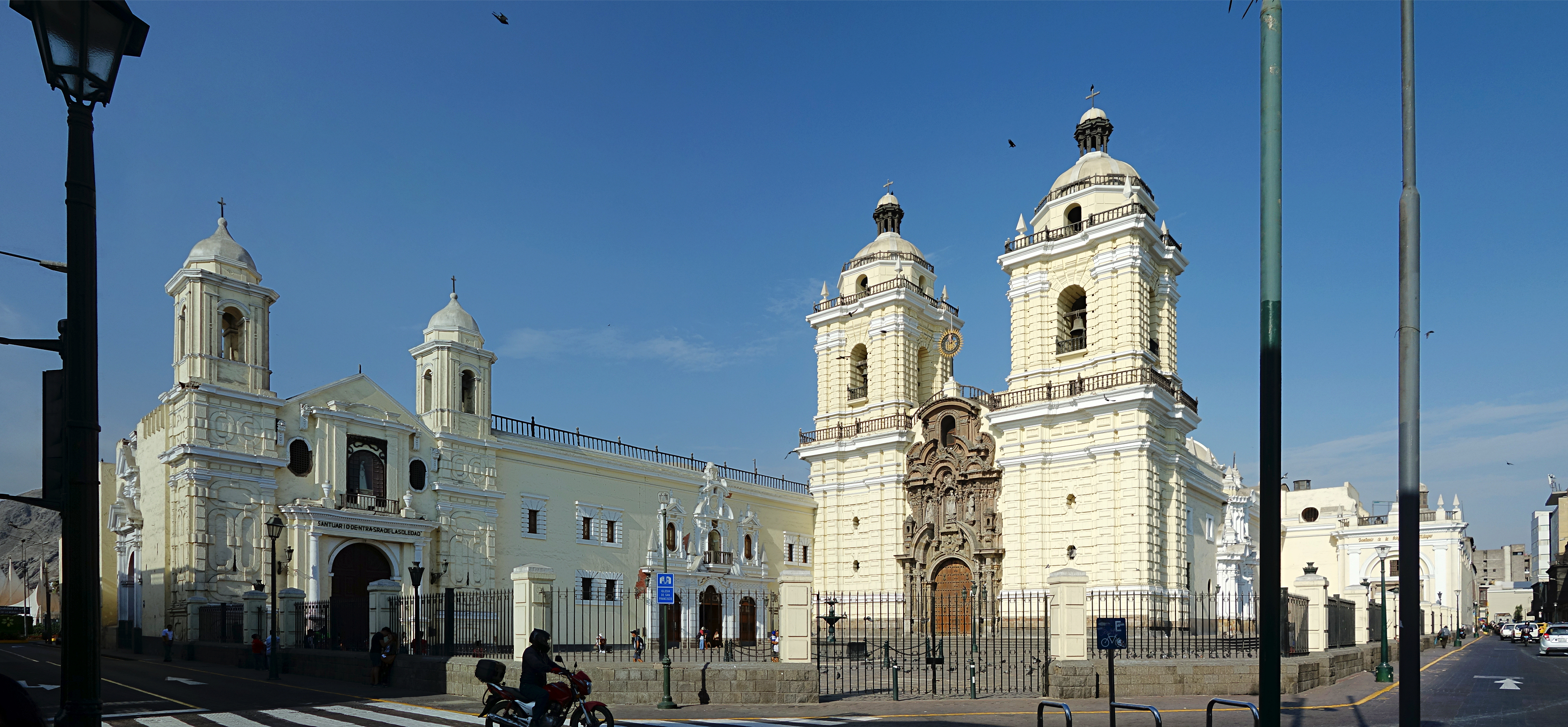
- View in 2018
- Basilica and Convent of Saint Francis
- Location: Corner of Áncash & Lampa, Historic Centre of Lima
- Country: Peru
- Denomination: Roman Catholic
- Website: Museum website

History
- Dedication: Francis of Assisi
- Consecrated: March 11, 1540

Architecture
- Architect: Constantino de Vasconcellos
- Style: Baroque
- Groundbreaking: 1535
- Completed: October 3, 1672

Administration
- Archdiocese: Archdiocese of Lima

The Basilica and Convent of San Francisco (Spanish: Basílica y Convento de San Francisco) (Note: Also known as San Francisco el Grande or as San Francisco de Jesús.) is a Catholic church building located in the Historic Centre of Lima, Peru. The church, together with the Sanctuary of Our Lady of Solitude (Spanish: Santuario de Nuestra Señora de la Soledad) and the Church of the Virgin of the Miracle (Spanish: Iglesia de la Virgen del Milagro), forms a religious monumental complex surrounded by Amazonas, Áncash and Lampa streets, as well as Abancay Avenue.

Spanish philologist and scholar Ramón Menéndez Pidal described it as "the largest and noblest monument that the conquest erected in these prodigious lands". The church and convent form part of the Historic Centre of Lima, which was added to the UNESCO World Heritage List in 1991.

== History ==
This set of religious buildings is one of the most important and best architectural centers of the city. It is also one of the most extensive and beautiful legacies of the viceroyalty era, consequently becoming one of the cultural centers of Peru that generates increased interest in visitors. The buildings of the Sanctuary of Nuestra Señora de la Soledad, with a Neoclassical façade; the Convent of San Francisco itself, with a Baroque façade, and the Chapel del Milagro, with a Neoclassical façade, make up the monumental complex.

Once Lima was founded on January 18, 1535, by Francisco Pizarro, as is generally known, the plan of the city was drawn up and the lots were distributed. To the Franciscan Order of the Twelve Apostles, one of them next to Santo Domingo was ceded, on which Friar Francisco de la Cruz built a small ramada that he used as a chapel. After a while, Father De la Cruz had to leave, and since there was no other Franciscan in the valley, the lot was abandoned. Pizarro added it then to the one that had been given to the Dominicans and allocated another one for the Franciscans in the place that the Chapel del Milagro occupies today. In 1546, Francisco de Santa Ana arrived in Lima, who after recovering the land managed to build a modest and small church, which was later improved and expanded together with the convent by the Viceroy of Peru Andrés Hurtado de Mendoza, Protector of the Order. During the following century, the convent underwent a series of repairs and decorations that ended up turning it into a marvel of art in the colonial era. Its construction was not very solid at that time, so in 1614, the architect and major worker of the convent, Friar Miguel de Huerta, noticed that the pillars of the building had poor foundations and were placed on gravel.

On February 4, 1655, an earthquake occurred in Lima that brought down the Franciscan Convent, destroying its artistic riches and collapsing the entire effort of a century.

Francisco de Borja, general commissioner of the Order, was the one who contracted the services of the Portuguese architect Constantino de Vasconcellos, who drew up the plans, and the Liman master builder, Manuel Escobar, to commission them to build a new convent on the same site. And so it happened that the first stone was laid by the then-viceroy, Luis Enríquez de Guzmán, Count of Alba de Liste, on May 8, 1657, and then in 1669, the new general commissioner of the order, Friar Luis de Cervela, who managed to complete it.

The new convent was inaugurated with great pomp on October 3, 1672, with repairs inside the convent continuing until 1729. Inside today, the convent has attractions that will be described, together with its courtyards and gardens, which are surrounded by arcades with Sevillian azulejos plinths by the Hernando de Valladares workshop. According to the traditions written by Ricardo Palma, these azulejos were placed by Alonso Godínez, a native of Guadalajara, Spain, who had been sentenced to hang for having killed his wife, the same as being confessed by the guardian of the Basilica of San Francisco the same day of his execution, he communicated this ability to him. Without wasting time, the confessor immediately went to the Government Palace to request Godínez's pardon, which he obtained on the condition that he would wear the habit of a lay brother and never again set foot outside the convent door. These Sevillian azulejos, brought directly from Seville, were donated by people like the famous Catalina Huanca, who was Francisco Pizarro's goddaughter, who went from Huancayo to Lima with 50 packhorses loaded with gold and silver. On the other hand, the large amount of cedarwood, with which the different works of art presented by the convent were made, was sold by Pedro Jiménez Menacho, who was a wood importer, who received as payment according to Palma a small cup of chocolate. When savoring it, he left the canceled receipts on the table without waiting for his retribution. The wood was used in the coffered ceilings of the main cloister.

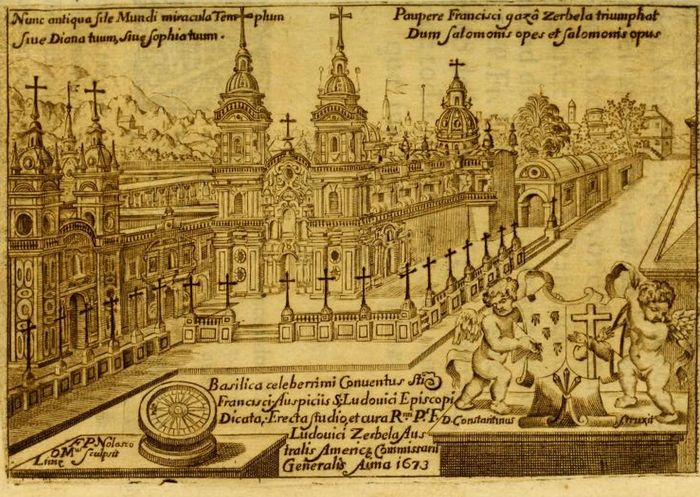
Church and Convent of San Francisco "El Grande", painting of 1673 by Pedro Nolasco

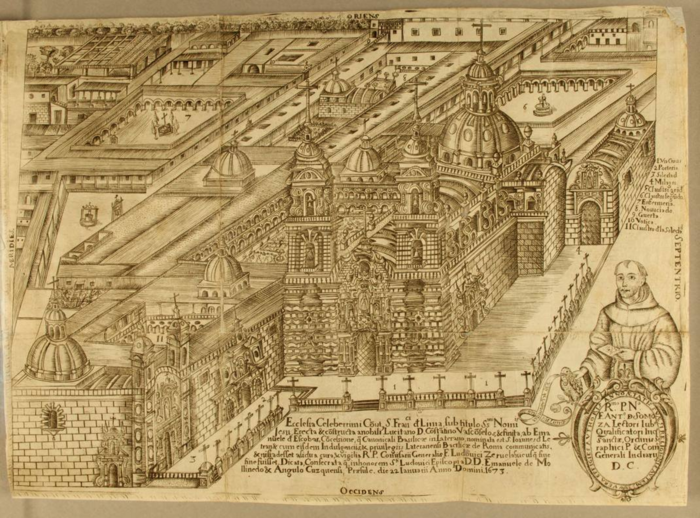
Basilica of San Francisco de Lima in 1675 by Juan de Benavides

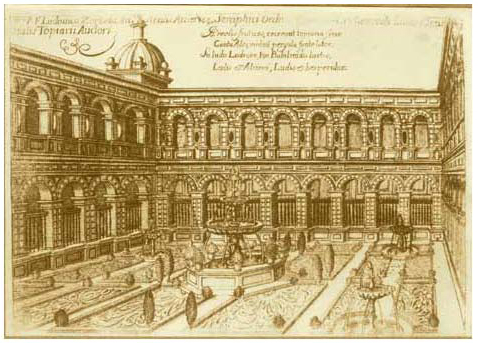
Main cloister of the Basilica of San Francisco, painting of 1673 by Pedro Nolasco

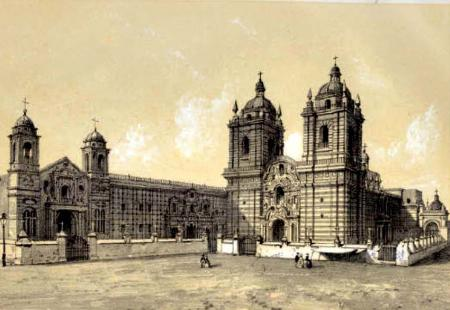
Basilica of San Francisco in the 19th century

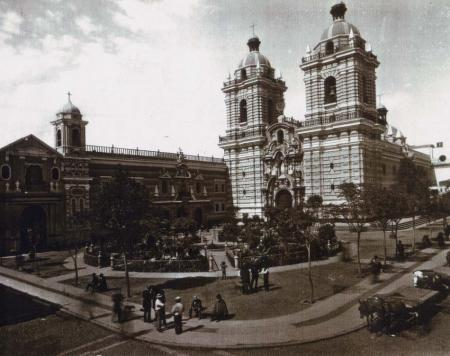
Basilica of San Francisco in the early-20th century

Due to ongoing restoration efforts by the Metropolitan Municipality of Lima that target the Historic Centre of Lima, the main square has been closed to the public since August 2022 due to a dispute between the local government and the Franciscan order, who administer the site, stemming from the demolition of a wall that enclosed the area considered by both UNESCO and local authorities as a public space. During these efforts, the crypt of the former Church of Our Lady of Solitude—demolished in 1669—was discovered.

In June 2025, the Constitutional Court of Peru ruled in favour of the Municipality, stating that the barrier—built in 1989—had no patrimonial value and that its removal on February 5, 2022, was part of a legitimate restoration plan by the city, authorising the continuation of restoration works soon after.

== Exterior ==
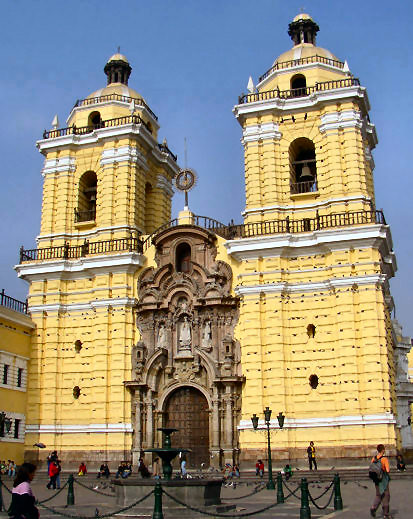
Main facade of Baroque style of the Church of San Francisco.

The facade is in a Liman Baroque style, with grace and monumentality. A rhythmic bossage runs through its walls that in its upper part is adorned by a wooden balustrade.

== Interior ==
The main altar is in a Neoclassical style. The interior also features the catacombs and the museum, the portal, the chapter house and the cloister. Crossing the threshold of its main doorway and to the left side is a memorial plaque of marble, with the emblem of the Holy See, with the following words engraved:

Pope John XXIII deigned to raise this church of San Francisco de Jesús de Lima to the category of minor basilica for its brief of January 11, 1963 that begin with these golden words: "Among so many and so beautiful temples that embellish the city of Lima, luminary on the shores of the great Pacific Ocean, the church of San Francisco de Jesús stands out deservedly, that adjoins the great monastery of los Frailes Menores produces great admiration both for the antiquity of its origin and the eminent of its architecture" etc. Lima, December 29, 1963.

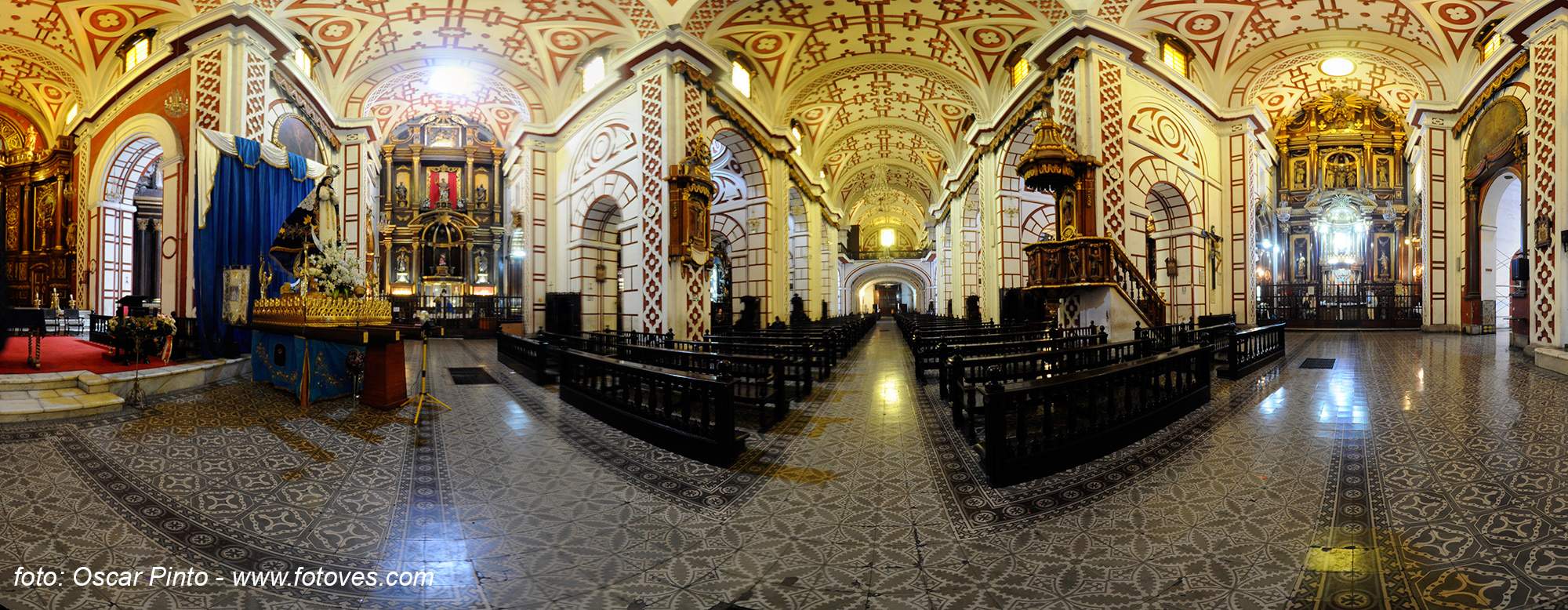
A view of the interior

=== Sacristy ===
The sacristy of the main temple is one of the current jewels of the Franciscan temple. The works of the sacristy were completed in 1729, highlighting its portal, made in 1729 by the ensign Lucas de Meléndez. Its vault was deteriorated as a result of the 1966 earthquake. It was restored in the 1990s with the help of the Spanish government. It has a chest of drawers made in 1650 with reliefs of saints in its interior, intended to store clothing and liturgical vestments, and houses an important series of paintings of the apostolado attributed to the Francisco de Zurbarán Workshop.

=== Anteportal ===
Crossing the door of the convent, there is a spacious room, with baseboards adorned with azulejos, whose main attraction is a triptych of the Crucified Lord, whose side paintings are works by the Italian Angelino Medoro. There are also paintings from the Lima School, of great value.

=== Portal ===
The portal includes a wooden sculpture of Crucified Jesus; paintings of saints from the Catholic Church, from the 17th-century Lima School; as well as paintings from the Cusco School, and two paintings in the form of a medallion, which represent passages in the life of Francisco Solano, made to celebrate his canonization.

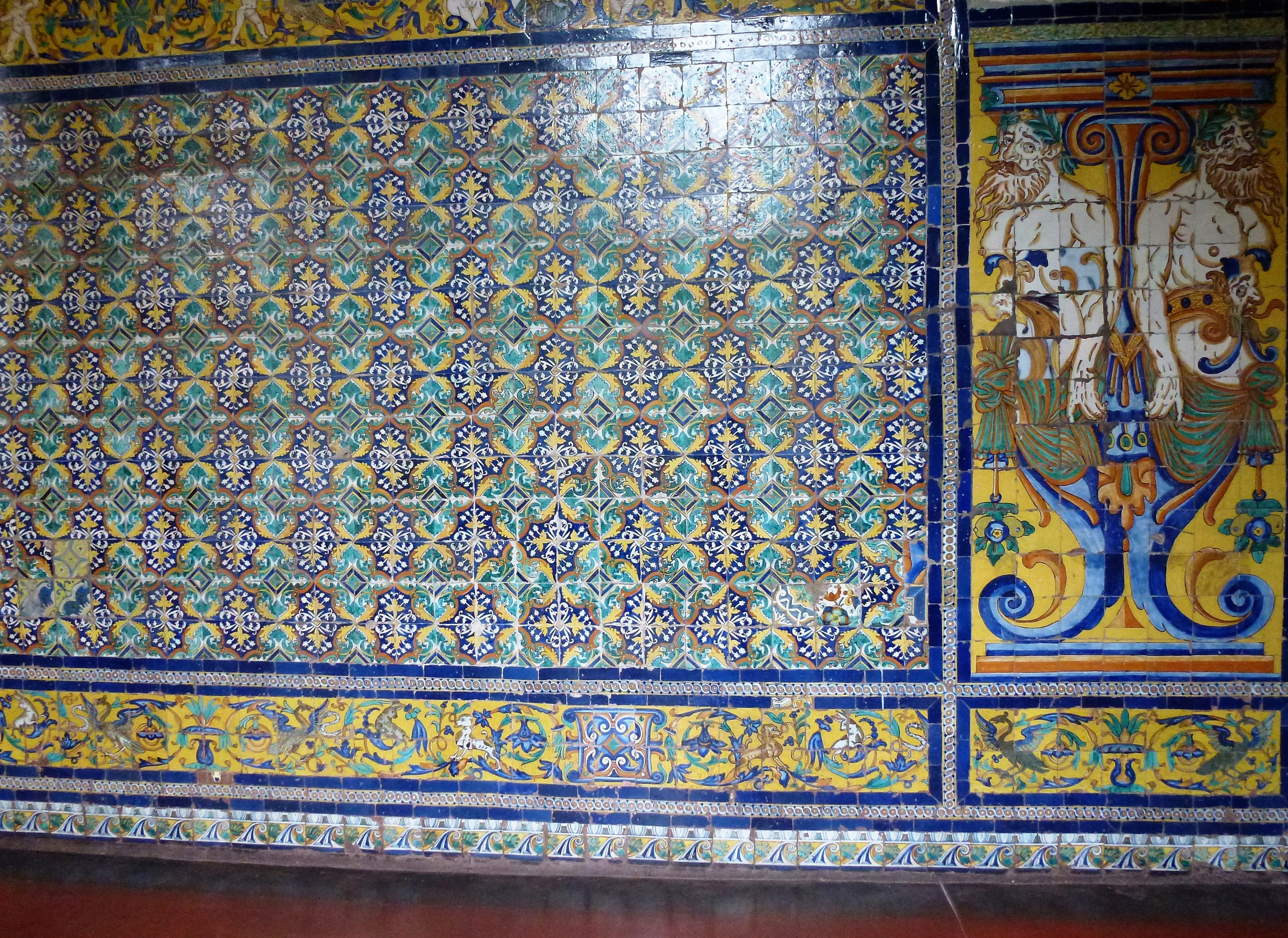
Part of the Sevillian azulejos (dating to 1642) of the main cloister, photo of 2011.

=== Vestibule ===
It is a spacious room with a carved wooden ceiling with baseboards featuring Sevillian azulejos. There are four paintings by famous artists, depicting Catholic saints; in the central part, the main attraction is an 18th-century Rococo-style pavilion, worked in wood and decorated in gold leaf. The pavilion was formerly used for the Corpus Christi festival; in it, a custody of the Cusco School was placed; today there is an image of Christ the Savior in Baroque style from the 18th century, which belongs to the sacristy of the temple.

=== Main cloister ===
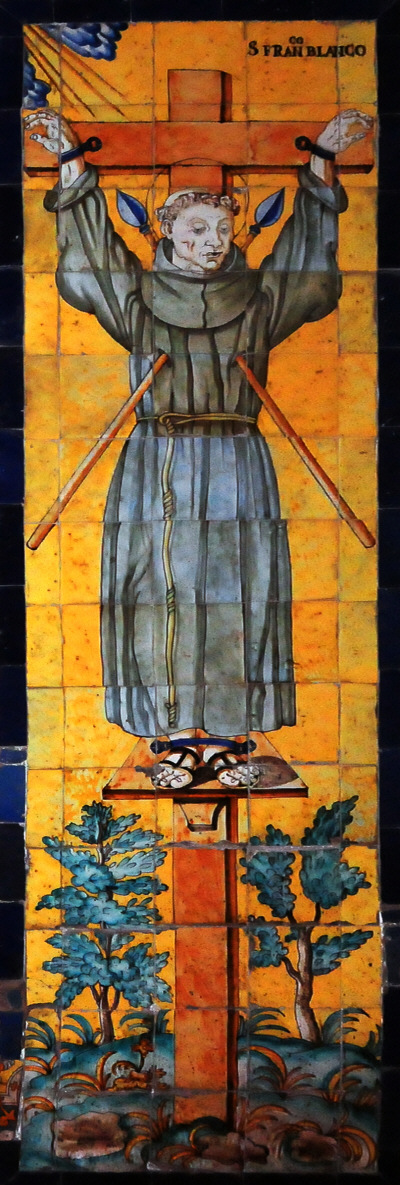
An azulejo dating from 1642 at the main cloister.

It is a quadrilateral courtyard, surrounded by galleries in the form of semicircular arches, eleven per side, all of them supported by pilasters. The walls are decorated with Sevillian azulejos on the plinth, dating from 1642, the theme of the decorations being Franciscan saints.

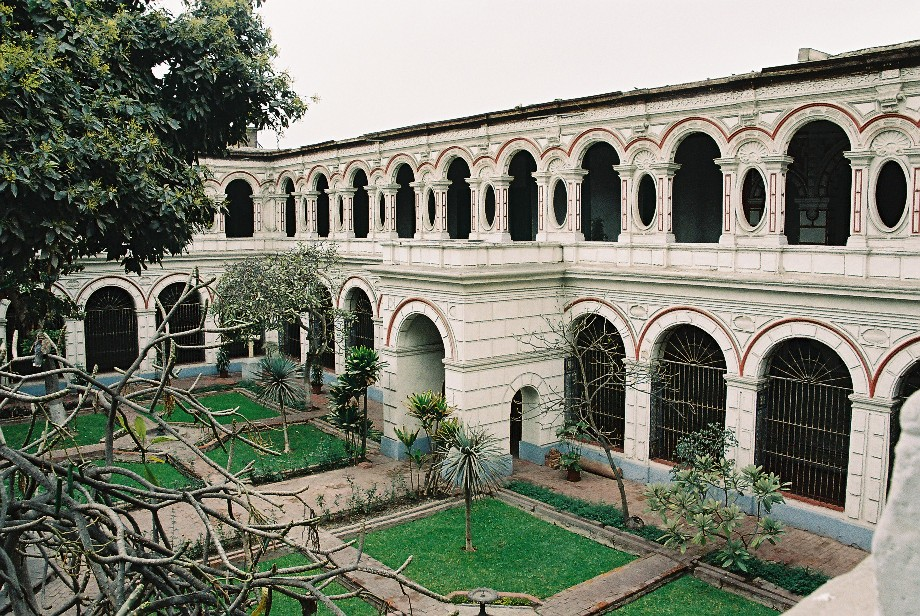
Main cloister of the Convent of San Francisco.

This main cloister has a collection of 39 paintings made in 1671: They represent scenes from the life of Saint Francis of Assisi, the same ones that were painted by Liman artists. When the canvases were taken down in 1974, in order to restore them, mural paintings with mixed technique, tempera and oil, corresponding to the Italian Mannerist School, dating from the first third of the 17th century, were discovered by chance. They were made on the wall of walls; they are currently under investigation by professional restorers. In the corners of the cloister there are four altarpieces carved in wood, representing four moments in the life of Saint Francis of Assisi, altarpieces that were made between 1638 and 1640. The ceilings are in Mudéjar style, made entirely of cedar wood brought from Nicaragua.

=== Chapter house ===
It is where the Franciscans met to celebrate their conventual chapters and elect a new superior or discuss matters of major importance. There are two rows of seats with raised backs that surround the room and have in the center as a union of the two rows, the chair, main or tribune, which is crowned by the shield of the Order; In the center there is a high-relief wood carving with the image of Friar John Duns Scotus, as well as the image of the Immaculate Conception Patron Saint of the Franciscans, before whom they prayed before holding their meetings, in which they often took place. various problems between them, so the presence of the Viceroy's guard was necessary.

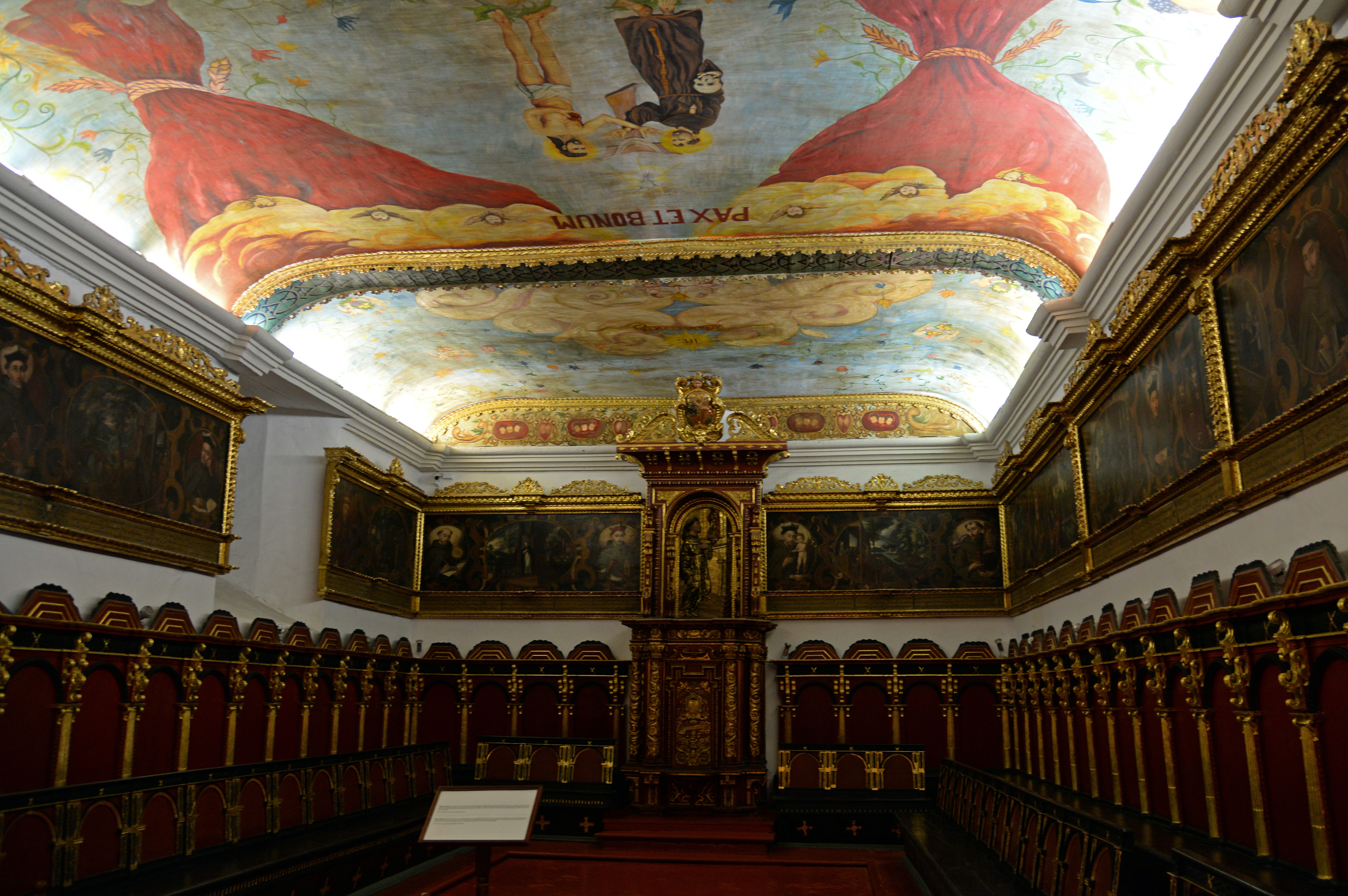
Chapter house

The chapter house of this convent is a historical room, because in it the regular clergy signed the Act of Independence, while in the cathedral it was signed by members of the secular clergy. Another of the artistic values that we must highlight in this room is the presence of a canvas that represents Our Lady of la Antigua, a virgin with a dark complexion.

=== Room of Biers ===
Different biers are preserved in the room that serve for the processions of the saints of the Catholic Church. The following can be differentiated: one of embossed silver, which is used on the first Sunday of November of every year for the procession of the image of Jude the Apostle; another, carved in wood, and covered in gold leaf with fine openwork, made in 1732 on the occasion of the celebrations for the canonization of San Francisco Solano; and a third, destined for Saint Francis of Assisi, also worked in wood and covered in gold leaf, was made in 1672. It has been used for many years in the traditional "Procesión del Paso", between the basilica of San Francisco and that of Santo Domingo.

=== Museum or Room of Profundis ===
Environment intended for the exhibition of a collection of eleven paintings of approximately three meters; each one represents the "Passion of Christ" and belong to the workshop of the great Flemish master Peter Paul Rubens, all of them of great execution, harmony of color and great expression in their characters. Like any teacher, Rubens dedicated himself only to making the sketch and his students continued working on it, often limiting themselves to giving the final touches. Also, the way in which a balcony with Mudéjar-style latticework is preserved here, called the "balcony of Pizarro", because it was in the Government Palace. There are other important attractions such as the fact that, at the back of the room, there is an ivory crucifix, which was brought from the city of Manila, Philippines. There is a crypt in the center of the room where the protectors of the Order were buried.

=== Refectory ===
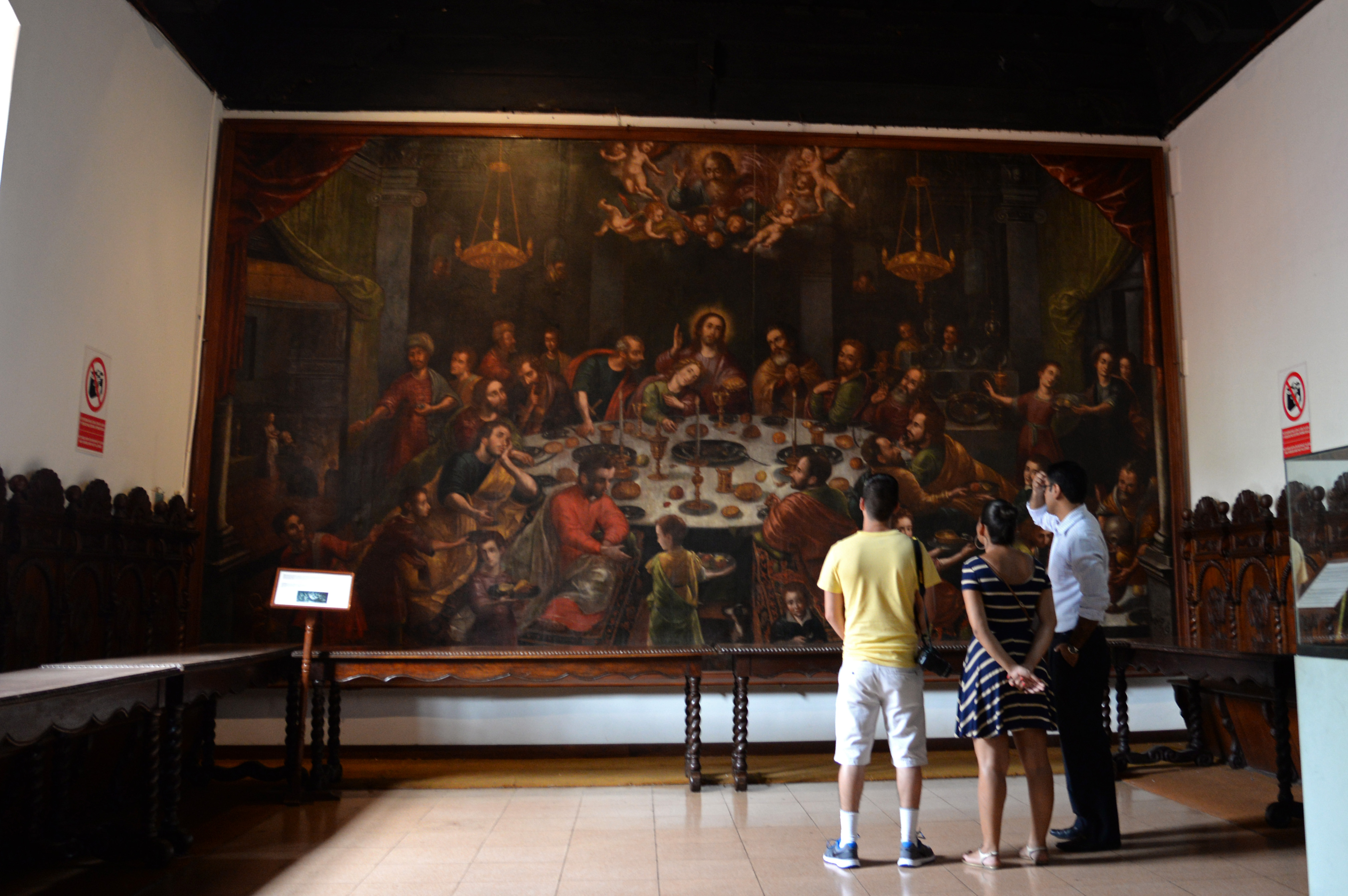
Last Supper by the Belgian Jesuit Diego de la Puente, painting made in 1658. at the refectory.

It is the location that was formerly used for the dining room. In this place is the famous collection of fifteen paintings that represent the Twelve Apostles, Christ the Redeemer, the Virgin Mary and Saint Paul, imposing paintings that belong to the artistic work of the Spanish master Francisco de Zurbarán. Zurbarán was a painter who made his works in the Baroque style, mostly on religious themes, in which the composition and color are totally fantastic, giving the impression of observing a natural image. The works of this artist are in the best museums in the world. Accompanying this Zurbarán collection is the outstanding collection of ten canvases representing the Apostles, which are a 19th-century copy of Rubens' Apostolate that is in the Prado Museum. At the back of this room there is a huge canvas of the Last Supper, made in 1658 by a Belgian Jesuit that only his name was registered as Diego de la Puente. He lived in this church.

=== Antesacristy ===
Here there is an immense canvas of five by six meters, which represents the family tree of the Franciscan Order, a work that dates from 1734; it is a Liman painting by an unknown author.

=== Upper cloister ===
Upon reaching it is the top of the convent, from where the garden with the five bronze fountains can be seen. In the corners there are four of the 27 alabaster crosses that were initially located on the perimeter of the atrium or square of the building complex. In this part of the Convent are also the rooms of the Franciscans. Its primitive columns were made of black stone brought from Panama. Subsequently, they were withdrawn due to deterioration due to strong seismic movements and replaced by the current ones of greater consistency. There are also paintings on the walls here with images of Catholic saints.

=== Choir ===
The choir was made in 1658 by the Quitoan-Franciscan-builder Antonio Rodríguez. In earlier times, the Franciscans used to gather here for their services or religious ceremonies. It is a rectangular piece, measuring 22 metres (72 ft) long by 12 metres (39 ft) wide, where an impressive Baroque choir stalls, carved in cedar, which extends on both sides, are preserved. It also consists of 130 seats, having in the central part, as a union of the two rows, the main seat of the Guardian of the Order, the same one that has on its back a carving of the embrace of Saint Francis of Assisi and Saint Dominic.

The stalls are preciously carved and engraved. In the second row, the figures of 71 images of the Christian religion can be seen in high relief, which are separated by small corbels in the form of caryatids. In the center is the lectern, a revolving piece of furniture where the songbooks were placed. All the wood that was used for the work of this chairs is totally cedar, brought from Costa Rica during the 17th century and made in total Baroque style.

=== Library ===
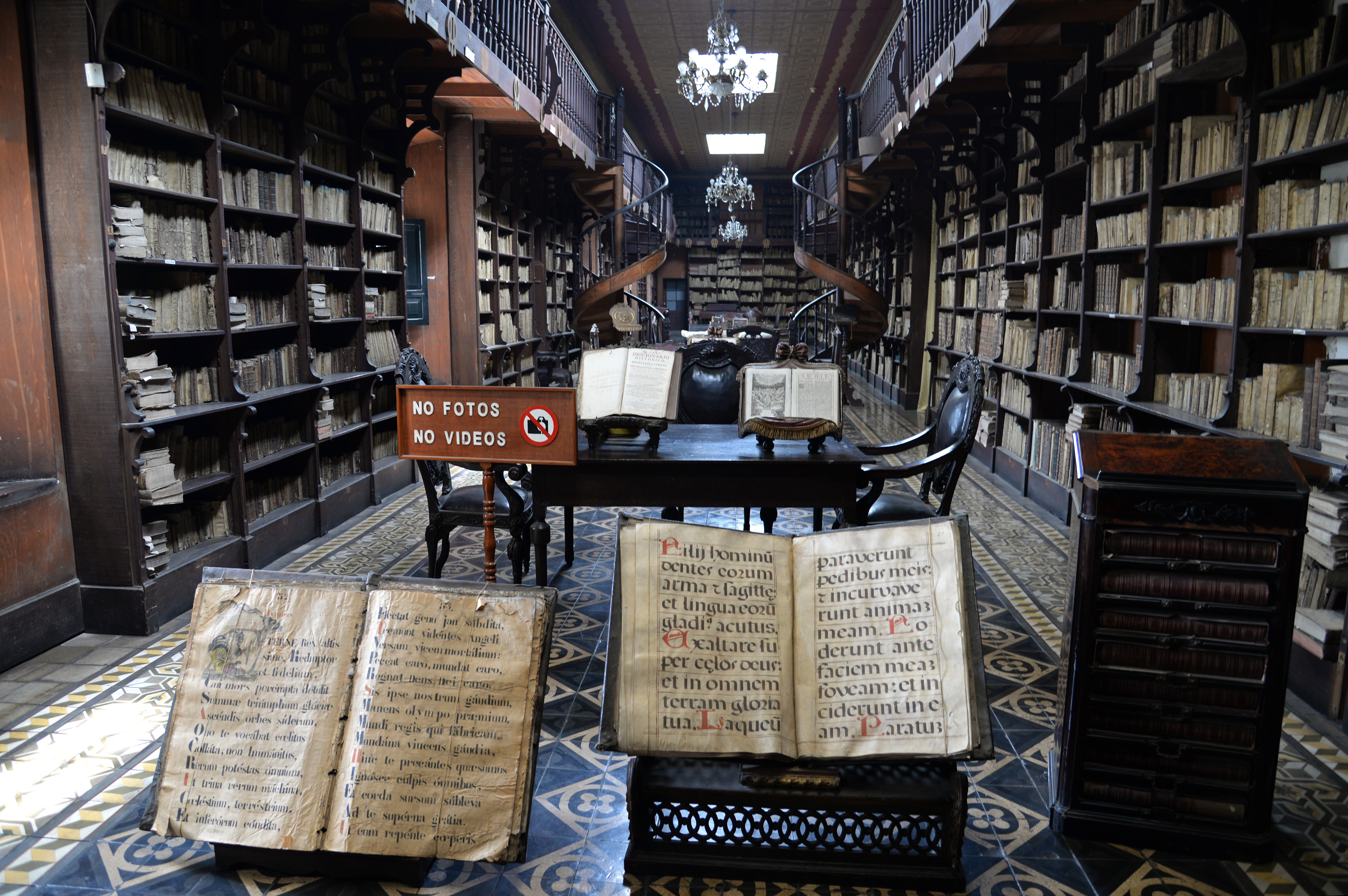
The library

In the library, there are approximately 25,000 volumes, some dating to the 16th century. There are very rare editions, incunabulas and Franciscan chronicles from the 15th to the 18th century, as well as some volumes published in the early days of printing in Peru, as well as more than six thousand parchments, numerous works by Jesuits, Augustinians, Benedictines, etc. There are also books on theology, philosophy, history, literature, music, canon law, ecclesiastical law; Bibles written in Latin, Spanish, French, Portuguese, Italian and some written in very rare languages.

=== Conventual archive ===
The San Francisco Archive is the place where the historical documents of the Franciscan province of the 12 apostles of Peru are preserved. Here are the handwritten proofs of the negotiations carried out with Spain and Rome by the Franciscan Order since its arrival in the Americas, especially in Peru. There is also graphic material such as maps, photographic plans, musical material and a small auxiliary library. They are currently organizing it in a systematic way to be more useful to its users, starting these works in 1983, and counting since 1987 with the help of UNESCO.

=== Dome ===
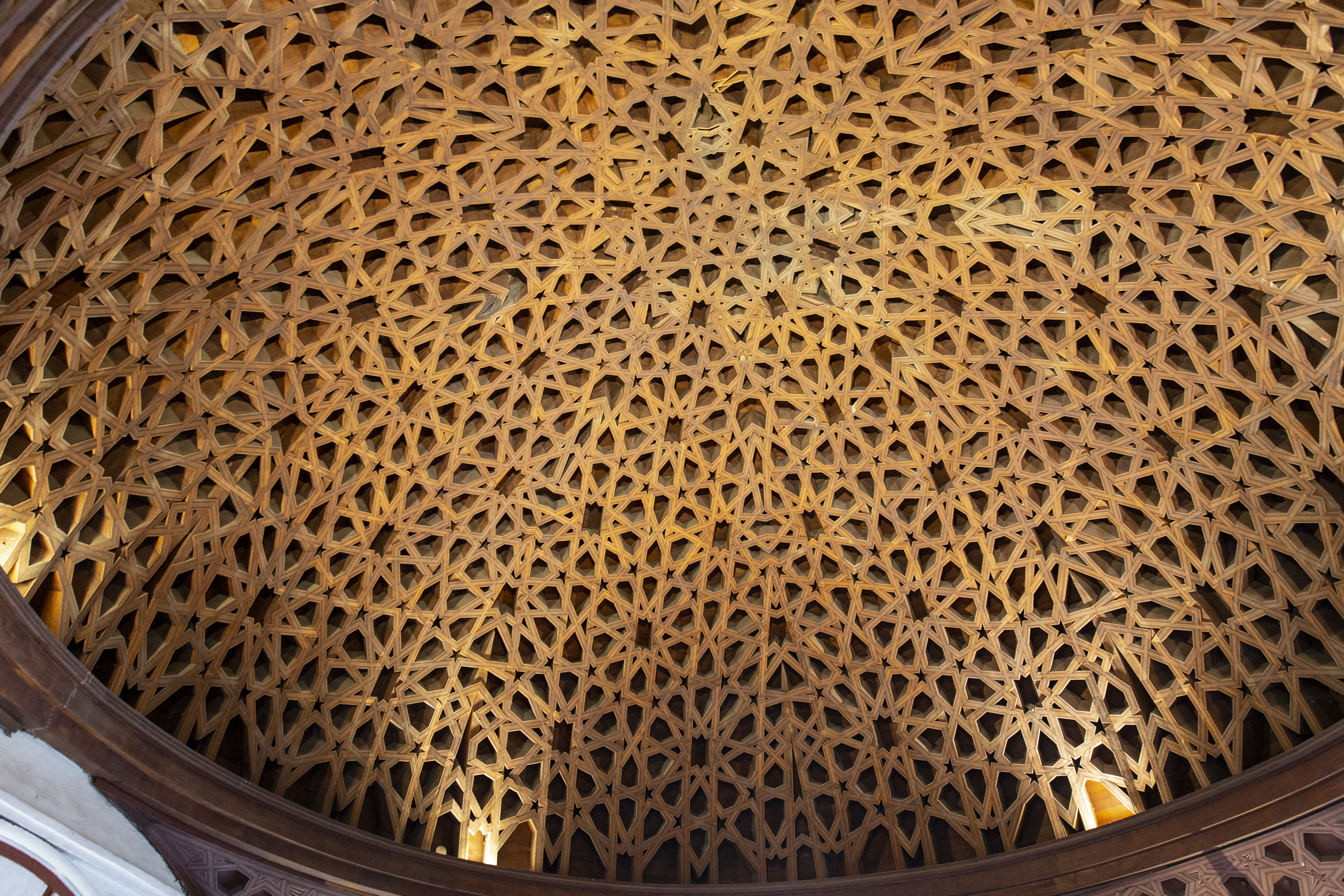
The Mudéjar dome from 1655.

Halfway up to the second floor on the woven brick staircase that is on the left hand side is the Mudéjar dome, which, by its finish and dimensions has no comparison on the entire American continent. It was initially built in 1546 and after an earthquake was finally re-built in 1655 with wood brought from Costa Rica by Friar Miguel de Huerta. In addition, on the wall there are two canvases with scenes from the life of Saint Didacus of Alcalá, patron saint of the nurses of the Franciscan Order.

=== Cloister of the Holy Land ===
It is so named because the coat of arms of the Holy Land can still be seen there. It was the preferred lodging of the Father General Commissioner, who is inside.

== Catacombs ==
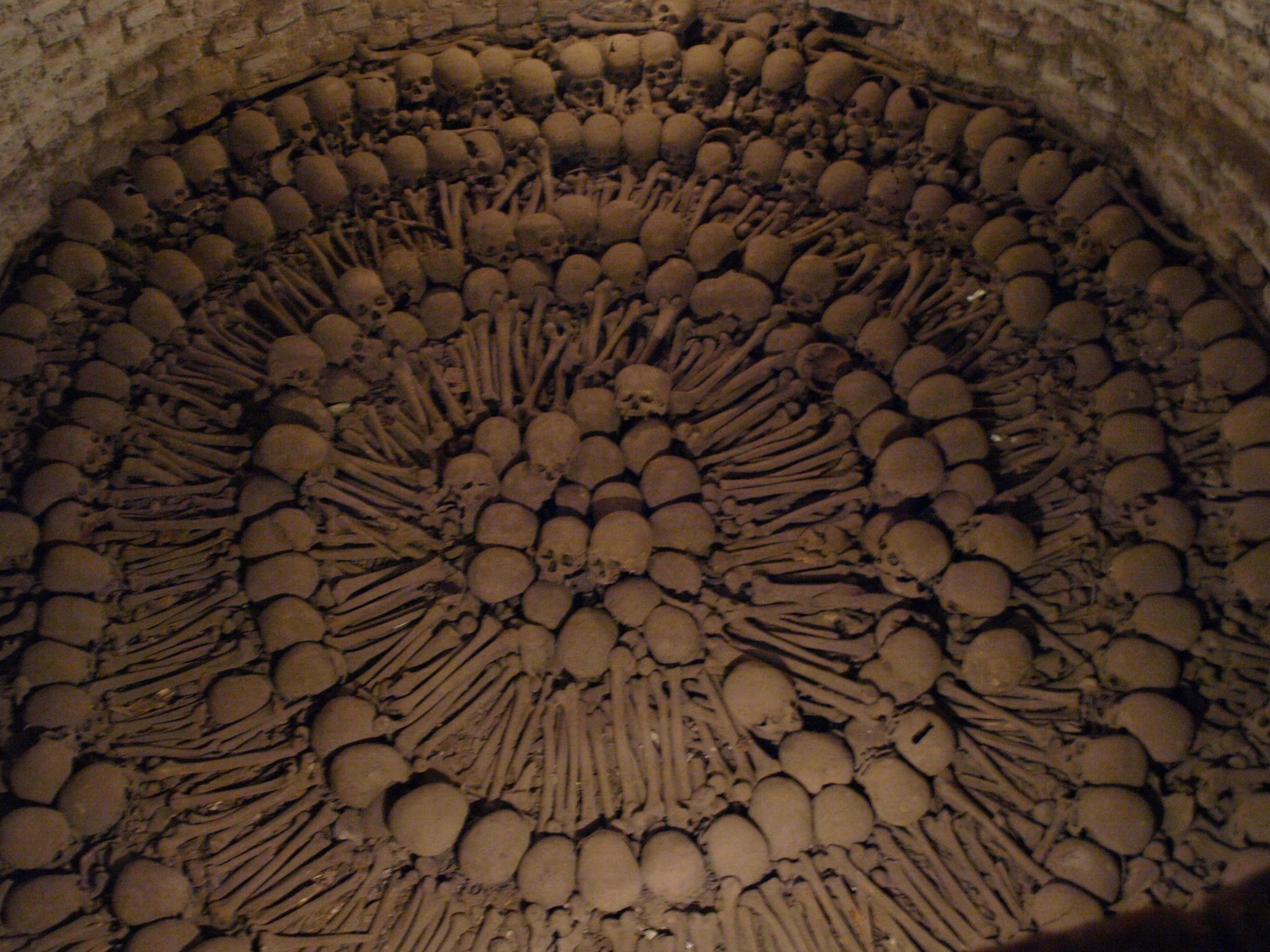
The Catacombs of the Basilica of San Francisco were the Old cemetery of the city in colonial times.

The building includes catacombs, which were the old cemetery in colonial times. It operated as such until 1810 and it is estimated that at that time it must have housed up to 70,000 people. Today the different rooms contain a good number of bones classified by type and arranged on some occasions in a rather artistic fashion, such as those in the mass grave. Some doors of this crypt, according to some hypotheses, lead to corridors that communicate with other churches and even with the Government Palace. The catacombs were discovered in 1951.

== See also ==
- Historic Centre of Lima
- 17th-century Western domes

== Bibliography ==
- The Sun and Happy Year of Peru Saint Francisco Solano, apostle and Universal Patron of said Kyngdom. Glorified, Adored and Feasted in his Temple and Maximum Convent of Jesus of the City of the Kings of Lima, by Pedro Rodríguez Guillén de Ágreda, 1735.
- Colection “Documental del Perú”, Department of Lima, Volume XV, Third Edition, April 1973, San Francisco. El monumento más grande y más noble de Lima, páginas 36-37.
- Velarde, Héctor. Itinerarios de Lima. Patronage of Lima, Second Edición, 1990, pages 19-21.
- Guide to Peru, Handbook for travelers, 6th. Edition, by Gonzalo de Reparaz Ruiz, Ediciones de Arte Rep, Lima - Peru, Book published in English by the Tourism Promotion Fund of Peru - FOPTUR, pages 97-99.
