= Sudameris =

Former bank

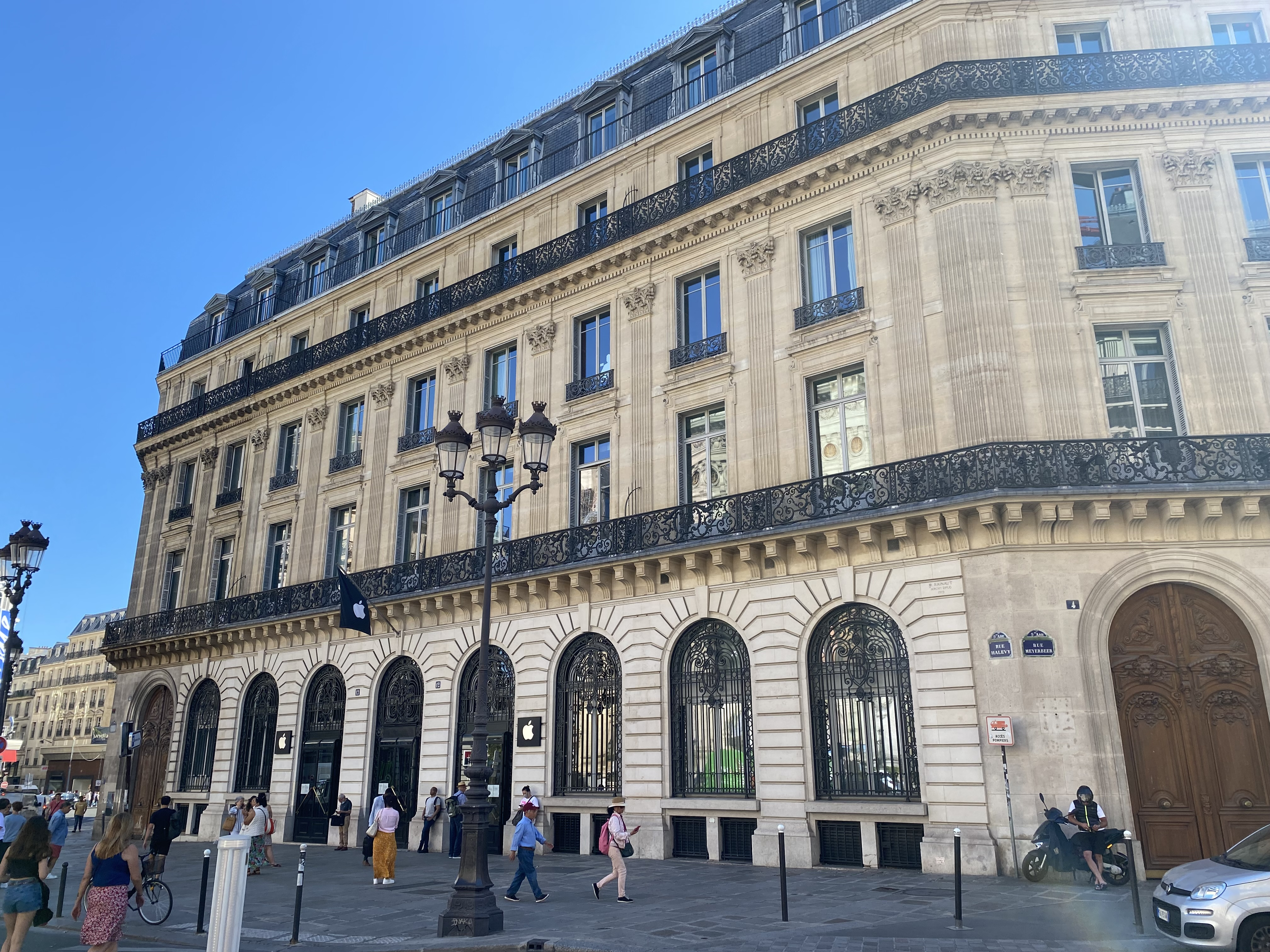
- Former head office of Banque Sudameris at 12, rue Halévy in Paris
- Formerly: Banque Française et Italienne pour l'Amérique du Sud
- Company type: Private company
- Industry: Financial services
- Predecessor: Banco Commerciale Italo-Brasiliano
- Founded: May 19, 1910
- Founders: French partners and Banca Commerciale Italiana (BCI)
- Defunct: c. 2003
- Fate: Merged with parent and local operations split and sold-off
- Successor: Banco GNB Sudameris and Sudameris Bank S.A.E.C.A.
- Headquarters: Paris, France
- Area served: South America
- Products: Banking services
- Owner: Banca Commerciale Italiana (BCI)

The Banque Française et Italienne pour l'Amérique du Sud (lit. 'French and Italian Bank for South America', BFIAS), abbreviated from the late 1970s as Sudameris, was a bank headquartered in Paris that served markets in South America. Founded in 1910 and eventually disbanded in the early 2000s, it was controlled during most of that near-century by Banca Commerciale Italiana (BCI).

As of early 2025, the Sudameris brand survived with the group's respective former local operations in Colombia and Paraguay, respectively Banco GNB Sudameris and Sudameris Bank S.A.E.C.A. The latter became Paraguay's largest bank in 2023.

== History ==
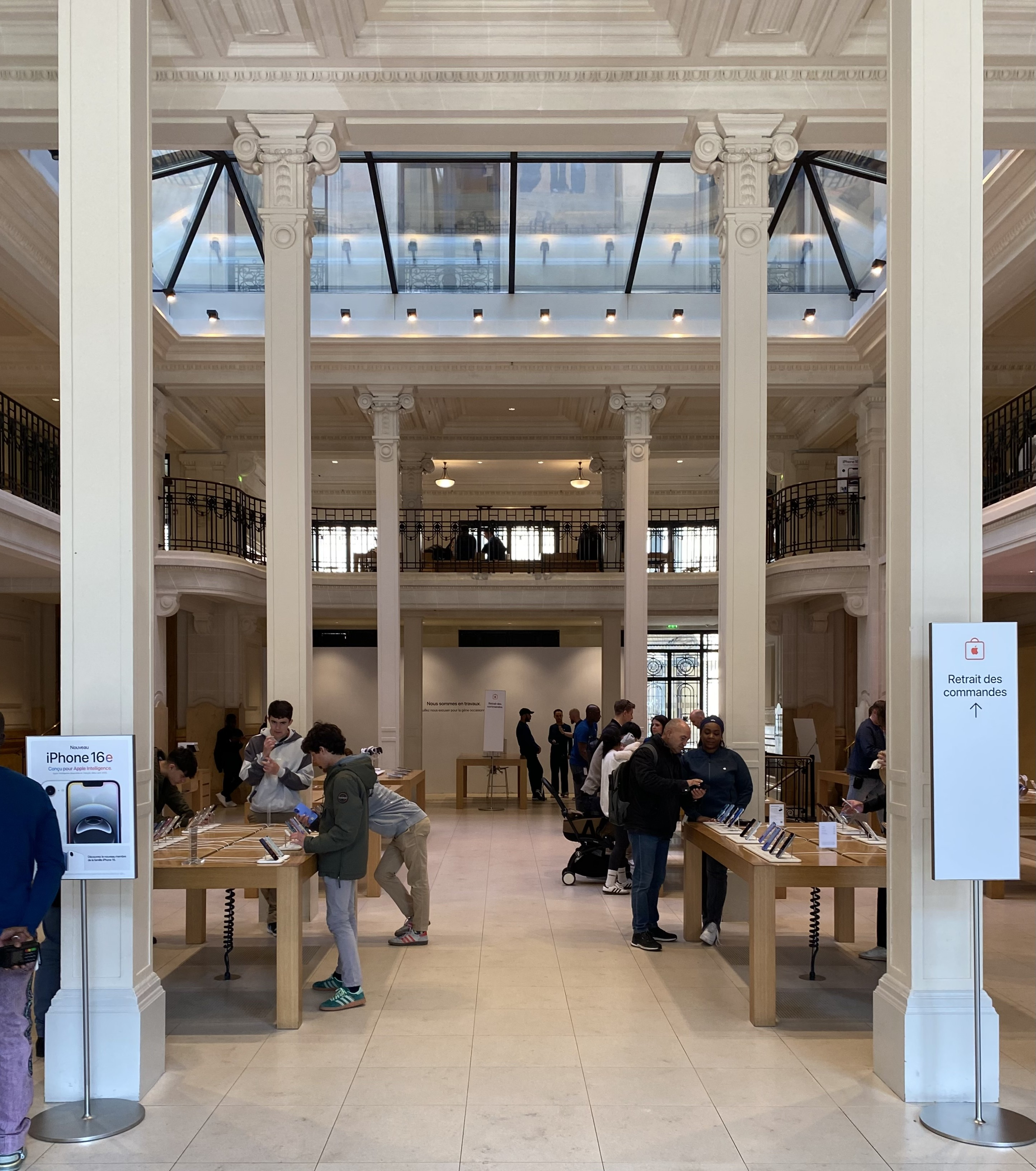
Former banking hall of Banque Sudaméris in Paris, lately an Apple Store

BCI sponsored the bank's creation with French partners on 19 May 1910, when the new venture took over the activities of the prior Banco Commerciale Italo-Brasiliano, established in 1900 in São Paulo and controlled by BCI since 1906. The context was France's ambition to develop its influence in South America, and BCI's desire to expand its access to the French financial market and leverage the rapid growth of Italian immigrant communities in South American countries. The initial ownership structure included BCI (43.3 percent), the Banque de Paris et des Pays-Bas (BPPB, 17.6 percent), Société Générale (13.2 percent), and others.

The bank was established from the outset at 12, rue Halévy, a prestigious building across street from the Palais Garnier, originally erected in 1863. It would remain there for close to a century, sometimes referred to by the address of another entrance to the same building at 4, rue Meyerbeer. In 2010 the former Sudameris banking hall there was repurposed to host an Apple Store.

After World War I, BCI became the bank's majority shareholder with 65 percent equity ownership. The bank's governance remained a matter of French-Italian compromise, however, with a French chairman and Italian chief executive based in Paris. By 1939, the bank had branches in Brazil (São Paulo, Rio de Janeiro, Santos, Bahia, Curitiba, Porto Alegre, Recife, plus 19 agencies in smaller areas), Argentina (Buenos Aires and Rosario), Chile (Santiago and Valparaíso), Colombia (Bogotá, Barranquilla and Medellín), and Uruguay (Montevideo).

During World War II, BCI and the BPPB moved some of the bank's general management from Paris to Buenos Aires, in order to allow their joint venture to claim neutrality in the conflict. These managers established a Directorate-General for South American Countries (Italian: direzione generale per i paesi sudamericani, known as DIGESUD). After France was invaded in June 1940, DIGESUD acted as head office of the South American operations.

Following the liberation of France, Charles de Gaulle froze Italian assets in the country. In 1947, however, the French government waived its right to reparations for war damages, provided that BCI would reduce its stake in the bank to less than half by selling the rest to French buyers. The Banque de l'Indochine subsequently became a shareholder, but BCI was again majority shareholder by 1948. That year, the bank restarted its activity in Brazil, which it had stopped in 1941.

In 1978-1979 the bank adopted the shortened name Sudameris and used it in its subsidiaries, e.g. Banco Sudameris Brasil, Banco Sudameris Paraguay, Banco Sudameris International de Panamá. Banco Sudameris reopened in Santiago (Chile) in 1979, and Banco Sudameris Colombia was created in 1982. The group, however, experienced financial stress during the 1980s.

By 1990, the ownership structure of Banque Sudameris was 48 percent held by BCI, 12 percent held by each of Paribas, Indosuez, Union Bank of Switzerland, and Dresdner Bank, and 4 percent held by other shareholders. By then it had branches in Argentina, Chile, Panama, Uruguay, the United States, as well as Monaco and Grand Cayman, and subsidiaries in Brazil, Colombia and Paraguay.

In 1991, BCI purchased the French banking subsidiary of Sudameris and renamed it COMIT France; in 1994, BCI became sole owner of the entire Sudameris group by buying out its other shareholders, unusually exchanging the acquired shares against Latin American government debt securities. In 1995 it formed Banco Sudameris Argentina SA from what had been until then separate local branches. In 1998, Sudameris Brazil acquired Banco América do Sul, founded by Japanese immigrants in 1944. In 1999, Sudameris Peru acquired both Banco de Lima and Banco Wiese. In 2000, Sudameris Argentina absorbed Banco Caja de Ahorro.

Following the merger of BCI with Banca Intesa in 2000, the new group Intesa BCI decided to leave the South American market and refocus its activity on Europe. In 2003, Sudameris Argentina was sold to Banco Patagonia; Sudameris Brazil was sold to Banco Real, later part of Santander Brasil; and Sudameris Colombia was sold to the Gilinski Group before merging in 2005 with Banco Tequendama to form GNB Sudameris. CFM Indosuez Wealth Management bought the Sudameris Monaco branch in 2004. In 2006, Scotiabank acquired Banco Wiese Sudameris, the product of merger between Banco de Lima Sudameris and Banco Wiese, and rebranded it as Scotiabank Peru.

The remaining French banking operations of Sudameris were acquired in 2003 by ABN AMRO from Banca Intesa. The parent entity thus became a mere asset management company, which was eventually sold to Crédit Agricole in 2006.

== Banco GNB Sudameris (Colombia) ==
By 2014, Sudameris was described as a niche bank specializing in commercial loans to small and medium-sized enterprises, consumer loans, and treasury products, with the country's second-largest network of automatic teller machines. In 2024, while still owned by the Gilinski Group, it was referred to as of "moderate systemic importance".

== Sudameris Bank (Paraguay) ==
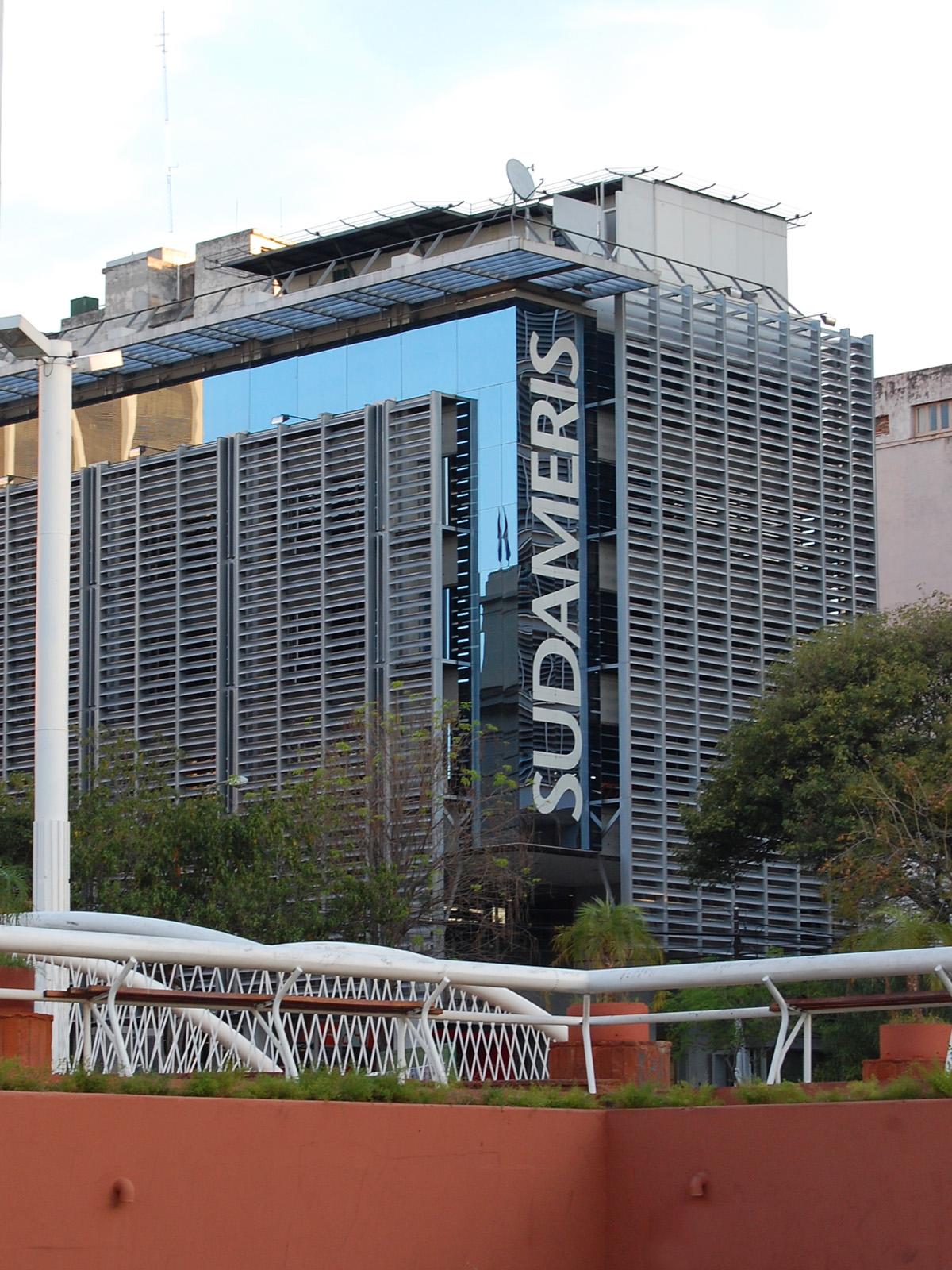
Sudameris Bank building in Asunción, Paraguay, in 2009

By the 2010s, Sudameris Bank S.A.E.C.A. was a mid-sized commercial bank, with market shares between 6 and 13 percent as of 2014 in the agriculture, cattle, industrial and large commercial segments. As of 2022, Abbeyfield Financial Holdings, based in Ireland, was the bank's majority owner (71.4 percent of shares, 78.2 percent of voting rights), with Dutch development bank FMO as minority investor (13.7 percent of shares, 15 percent of voting rights).

In 2023, Sudameris Bank acquired Banco Regional, another domestic bank, thus becoming the largest bank in Paraguay by total assets.

== See also ==
- Banco Transatlántico
- List of banks in France
