= Gilinski Group =

Colombian conglomerate

- Type: Private
- Industry: Financial services
- Founded: 1990; 36 years ago in city, country
- Founder: Isaac Gilinski Sragowicz
- Headquarters: Medellín, Colombia
- Key people: Jaime Gilinski Bacal (CEO)
- Subsidiaries: Semana; Banco GNB Sudameris; Lulo Bank

The Gilinski Group is a corporate and banking conglomerate based in Colombia with subsidiaries and presence in the Cayman Islands, Panama, Paraguay and Peru. It was founded by the Colombian businessman and banker Isaac Gilinski Sragowicz.

The group owns Colombian enterprises such as Semana, Banco GNB Sudameris, and Lulo Bank, as well as 87% of Grupo Nutresa.

The CEO is the son of the conglomerate founder, Jaime Gilinski Bacal, the third richest man in Colombia, according to Forbes.

In March 2026, the Gilinski Group acquired approximately 20% of Geopark Limited, a leading independent energy company.
