= Veracruz, Panama =

Veracruz
- Corregimiento
- Location within Panama
- Coordinates: 8.8911°N 79.6236°W
- Country: Panama
- Province: Panamá Oeste
- District: Arraiján

Area
  - Land: 49.7 km^{2} (19.2 sq mi)

Population (2010)
  - Total: 18,589
  - Density: 374/km^{2} (970/sq mi)
- Population density calculated based on land area.
- Time zone: UTC−5 (EST)

Veracruz is a corregimiento in Arraiján District, Panamá Oeste Province, Panama with a population of 18,589 as of 2010. Its population as of 1990 was 8,224; its population as of 2000 was 16,748.

== Education ==
Lycée Français Paul Gauguin de Panama, the country's French international school, is in Panama Pacifico, Veracruz.
