= Indore Museum =

Museum in Indore, Madhya Pradesh, India

Central Museum, Indore
- Established: 1 October 1929
- Location: MD4511 A. B. Road, Indore, Madhya Pradesh
- Coordinates: 22°42′19.2456″N 75°52′37.6032″E
- Owners: Directorate of Archaeology, Archives and Museums,Govt. of M. P.

Central Museum is a museum situated in Indore in Madhya Pradesh state in India. It is located near the General Post Office in Indore.There are two galleries in the Museum.The artefacts exhibited in the museum range from the prehistoric to the modern era.

== History ==
The Museum was established on 1 October 1929, used to collect and reserve the antiquities founded in the region of the former Holkar State. It is also known as Central Museum.
