= Museum of the Central Reserve Bank of Peru =

Museum in Peru

Coordinates: 12°02′53″S 77°01′48″W

- Museo del Banco Central de Reserva del Perú
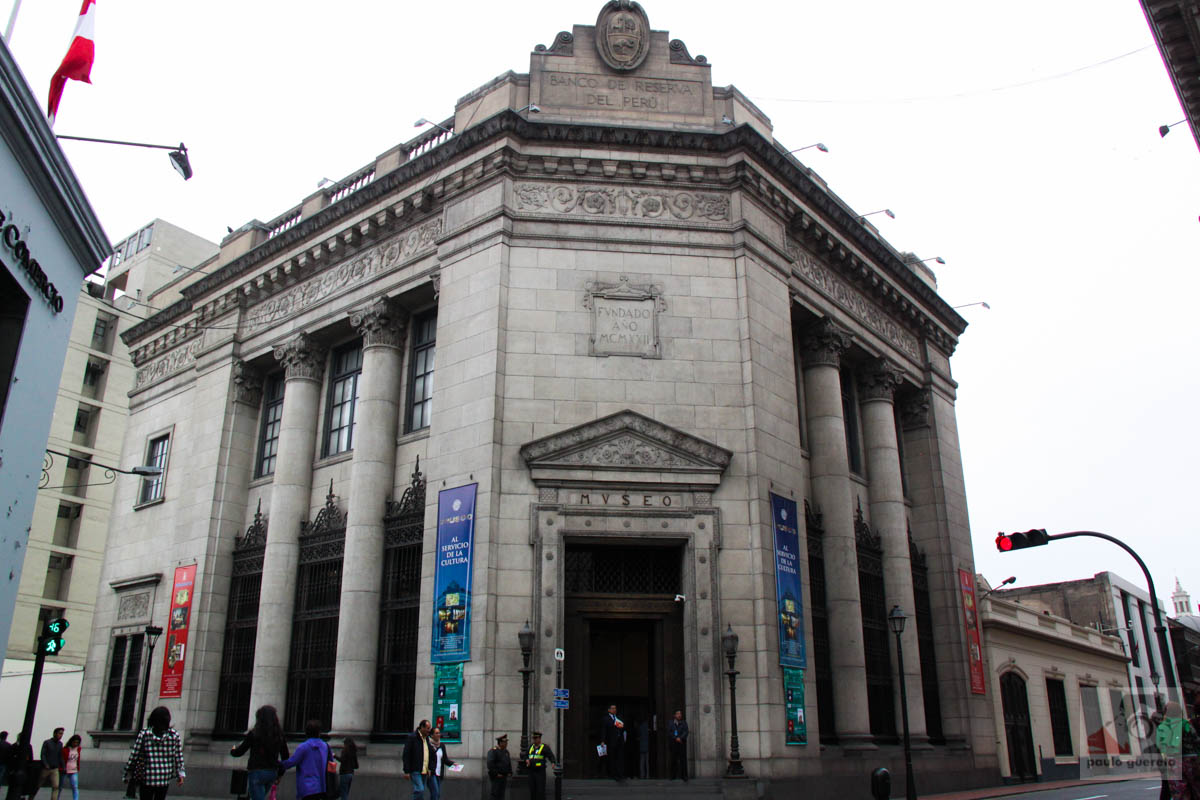
- Established: 2 February 1982
- Location: Lampa and Ucayali streets, Lima
- Owner: Central Reserve Bank of Peru
- Website: mucen.bcrp.gob.pe/mucen/

The Museum of the Central Reserve Bank of Peru (Spanish: Museo del Banco Central de Reserva del Perú, MUCEN), known also as the BCRP Museum or simply Central Museum (Spanish: Museo Central), is an archaeological, numismatic and artistic museum of the Central Reserve Bank of Peru, located at the corners of Lampa and Ucayali streets, in the historic centre of Lima, Peru.

== History ==
The museum is located on land acquired by the Central Reserve Bank of Peru (BCRP) in 1922 to occupy the bank's first premises. The bank building was inaugurated on January 2, 1929, inspired by the Italian architecture of the Renaissance period. It was unique at the time, as the materials used in its construction allowed for the building to have a considerable height.

The museum was inaugurated in 1982 by Carlos Rodríguez Saavedra and reopened in 2017, under the direction of Ulla Holmquist.

Since 2008, it organises the National Painting Contest (Spanish: Concurso Nacional de Pintura), which grants a cash prize to the winner. On June 25, 2019, the Diálogos desde lo contemporáneo art exhibition was inaugurated with the winning works of the contest.

== See also ==
- Central Reserve Bank of Peru
- Museum of Contemporary Art of Lima
