= Isaac Gilinski Sragowicz =

Colombian banker and financier (born 1934)

- יצחק גילינסקי

Colombia Ambassador to Israel
- In office 11 January 2010 – 13 August 2013
- President: Álvaro Uribe Vélez
- Preceded by: Juan Hurtado Cano

Personal details
- Born: 19 February 1934 (age 92) Barranquilla, Atlántico, Colombia
- Spouse: Perla Bacal Zweiban (m. 1957)
- Children: Jaime; Rutie; Tania

Isaac Gilinski Sragowicz (Hebrew: יצחק גילינסקי; born 19 February 1934) is a Colombian banker and financier. He served as Ambassador of Colombia to Israel from 2010 to 2013.

== Ambassadorship ==
Gilinski was appointed Ambassador of Colombia to Israel by President Álvaro Uribe Vélez on 28 October 2009 in a ceremony of protocol that took place at the Palace of Nariño; he later presented his Letters of Credence in a ceremony of protocol at Beit HaNassi to the President of Israel, Shimon Peres, on 11 January 2010. Gilinski's brother, Lazar, had also served as Ambassador of Colombia to Israel in the 80's.

== Personal life ==
Born Isaac Gilinski Sragowicz on 19 February 1934 in Barranquilla, he is the son of Lithuanian Jewish immigrants who settled in that city from Mandatory Palestine in the 1920s. He is married to Perla Bacal Zweiban since 1957, with whom he had three children: Jaime, Rutie, Tania. His eldest son Jaime is a prominent international banker and one of Colombia's wealthiest men.

== See also ==
- David de La Rosa Pérez
- Antanas Mockus Šivickas
- Gilinski Group
