= Hitachi Rail =

Japanese train manufacturing company

- Type: Division
- Industry: Rail transport
- Founded: 1924
- Headquarters: London, United Kingdom
- Key people: Giuseppe Marino (Group CEO); Mitsuo Iwasaki (Head of Japan Business); Katsumi Ihara (Chairman of the board)
- Products: Rolling stock and Railway signals
- Number of employees: 24,000
- Parent: Hitachi
- Website: www.hitachirail.com

Hitachi, Ltd. Railway Systems Business Unit, trading as Hitachi Rail, is the rolling stock and railway signalling manufacturing division of Hitachi outside Japan.

== History ==
=== Creation of the rail division and domestic activities ===
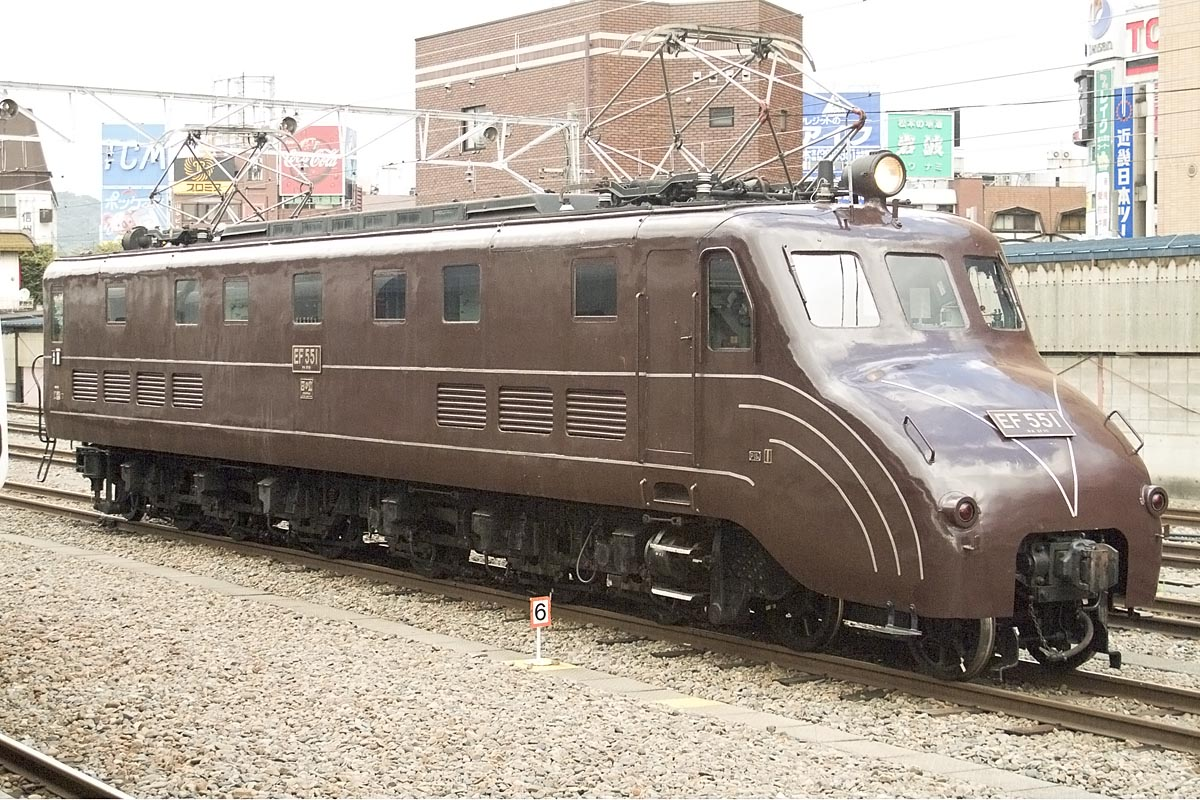
EF55 1, built by Hitachi in 1936

After the demand for ships decreased following the end of the First World War, Hitachi, under its founder Namihei Odaira, acquired the Kasado Factory in Kudamatsu, Yamaguchi from a nearly bankrupt shipbuilder. This factory was converted into a locomotive manufacturing facility. In the 1920s, Hitachi's railway products included the JNR Class ED15 locomotives, the first electric mainline locomotives built in Japan, and steam locomotives such as the Class 8620 and Class D50. As mainline electrification progressed, Hitachi developed and produced much larger and more powerful electric locomotives, such as the Class EF55 streamliners (1936), the Class EF56 (1937), and the Class EF57 (1940). During this time, Hitachi also supplied locomotives to various Japanese colonies, including Taiwan, Korea, and the South Manchuria Railway.

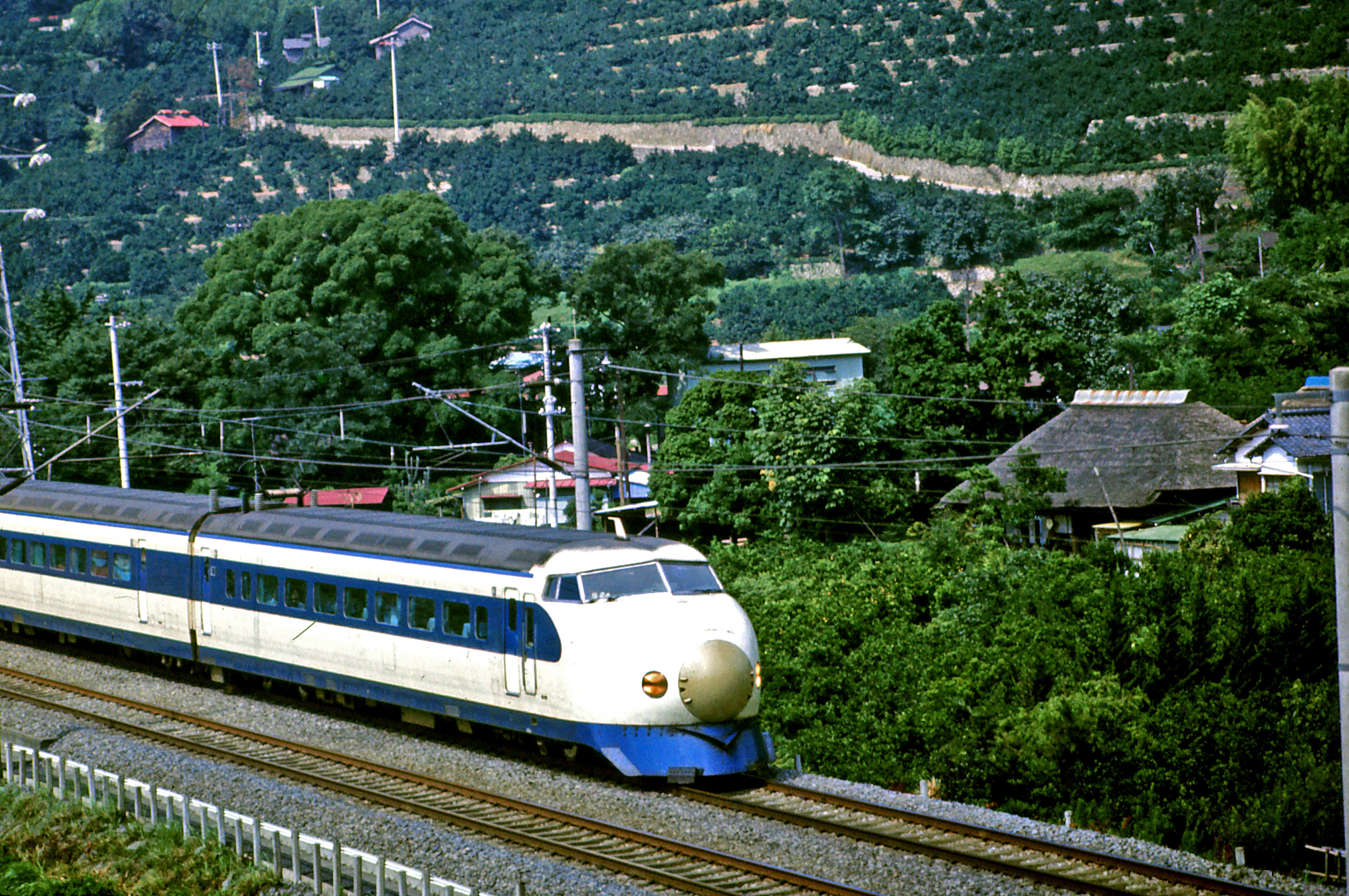
Hitachi was involved in the development and manufacturing of the 0 Series Shinkansen, the world’s first high-speed rail rolling stock.

After the Second World War, Hitachi primarily manufactured locomotives and other railway equipment for two decades. During this period, the company built the Class C62 locomotives, the largest and fastest steam locomotives in Japanese rail history. One of these, C62 17, still holds the world steam speed record for narrow-gauge tracks at 129 km/h. Another notable Hitachi-built locomotive was the EF58, which operated on the Tokaido Main Line express trains alongside the C62. In the 1950s, diesel locomotives were introduced on non-electrified lines in remote parts of Japan. Japanese National Railways adopted two types of mainline diesel locomotives: the diesel-electric DF50 and the diesel-hydraulic DD51. Hitachi was involved in the development and manufacturing of both.

In the 1950s, Hitachi began building electric multiple units (EMUs). Early examples include the Class 1000 Shinkansen prototypes (1962), the 0 Series Shinkansen (1964), and the Series 485 dual-voltage express train (1964). Hitachi has been involved in the development of nearly all types of Shinkansen rolling stock, as well as their operating systems, including automatic train control. Hitachi also licensed the straddle-beam type of monorail from the German company Alweg, which it used for the Tokyo Monorail in 1964, the world's first commercial monorail service and one of the world's busiest monorail lines. This product line still exists today as Hitachi Monorail, which is used in ten monorail systems as of 2026.

=== Global expansion ===
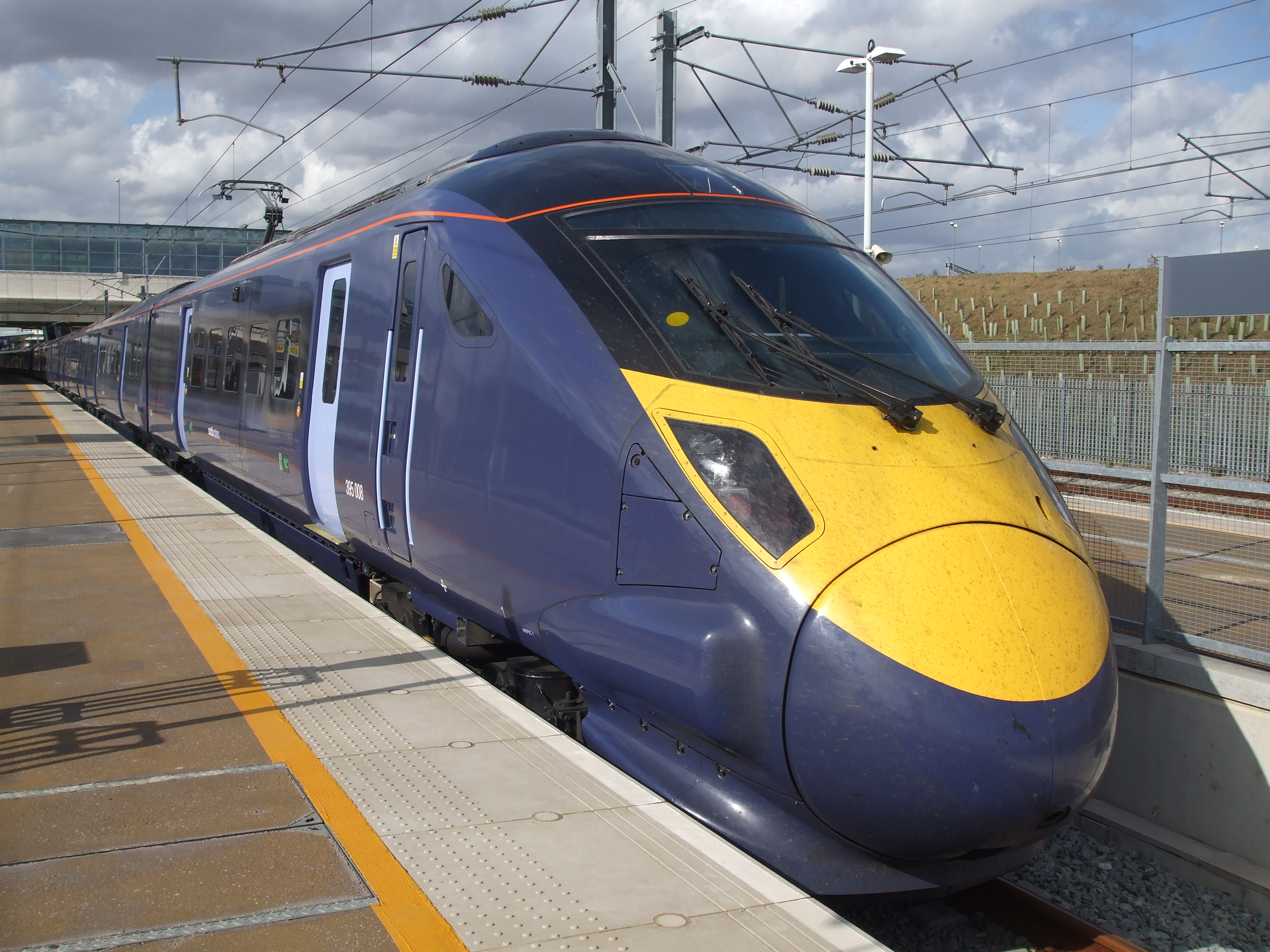
A British Rail Class 395 train produced by Hitachi

Between 1984 and 1988, Hitachi's rail division delivered 120 CQ311 series railcars to MARTA.

Hitachi Rail Europe (legally Hitachi Rail Limited) was established in London as the European headquarters of the company in 1999. Other subsidiaries have been established globally.

Hitachi markets a general-purpose train known as the "A-train", which uses double-skin, friction-stir-welded aluminium body construction. Hitachi's products have included the designing and manufacturing of many Shinkansen models, including the N700 Series Shinkansen.

On 24 February 2015, Hitachi agreed to purchase the Italian rolling stock manufacturer Ansaldo Breda and acquire Finmeccanica's stake in Ansaldo STS, the railway signaling division of Finmeccanica The purchase was completed later that year, at which point the company was renamed as Hitachi Rail Italy. Since then, Hitachi has obtained a majority stake in Ansaldo STS.

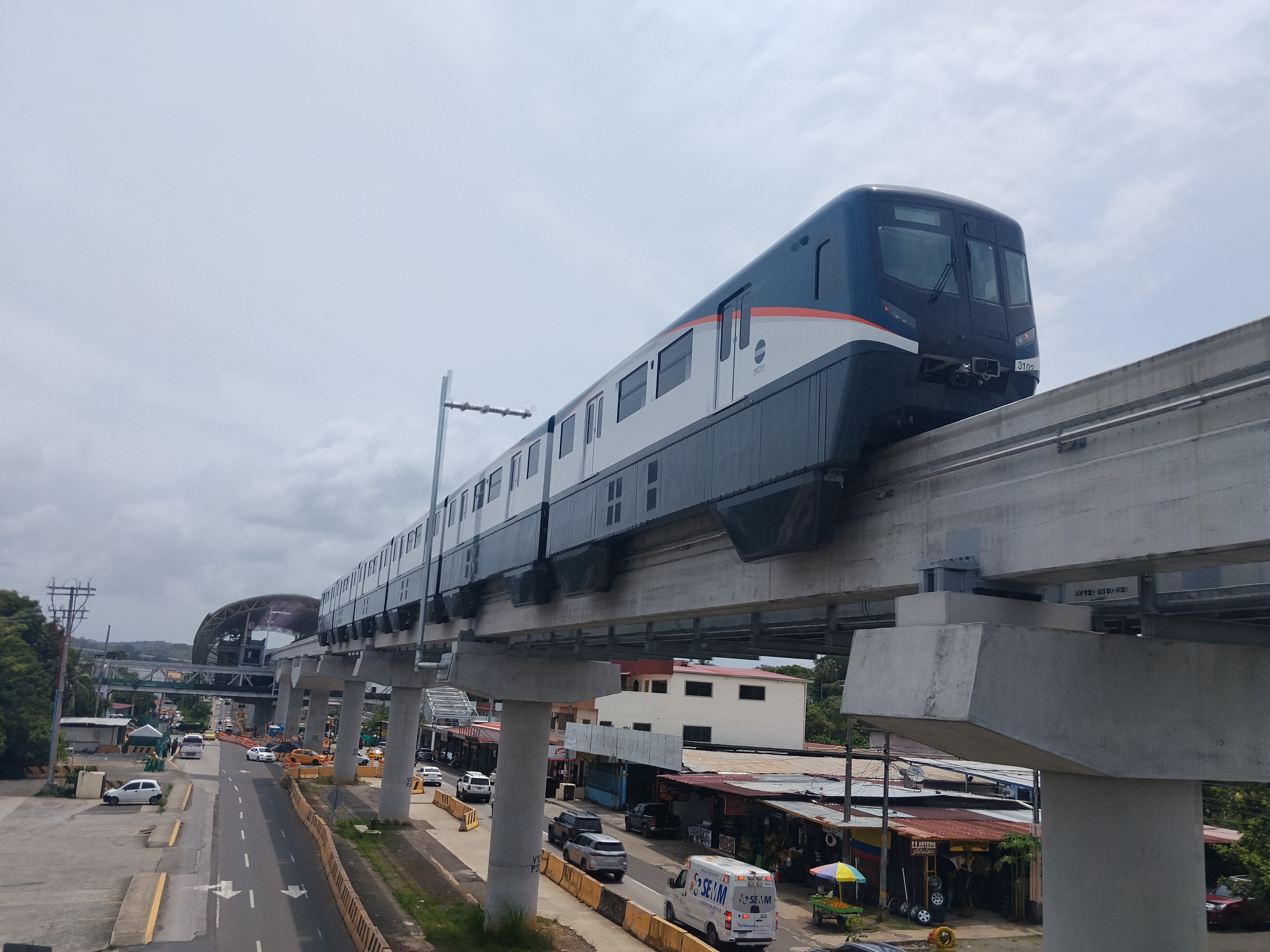
Hitachi Monorail undergoing dynamic testing on Nuevo Arraiján, Panama.

In August 2018, Panama announced an agreement with Hitachi, its subsidiary Ansaldo STS (now Hitachi Rail STS), and Mitsubishi Corporation for the supply of 28 six-car monorail trains specifically designed for the Panama Metro Line 3. The contract was formalized in October 2020 for US$883 million with the prime contractor, HPH Consortium. Due to cost overruns on the Line 3 project, the order was later reduced to 26 trains to achieve savings. The trains, manufactured at the Hitachi Kasado Works and based on the design of Osaka Monorail vehicles, were shipped to Panama between 2023 and 2025, with final delivery completed in July 2025. Commercial service is scheduled to begin in 2028.

In July 2020, Hitachi signed an exclusive agreement with Hyperdrive, a UK-based lithium-ion battery company, to bring battery-powered trains to the country. In October 2020, Hitachi Rail won the contract to supply the 8000 series of railcars for the Washington Metro. It opened a plant in Hagerstown, Maryland in 2025 for the US market, replacing its previous plant in Medley, Florida.

Late in 2021, Alstom announced the transfer of business relating to Bombardier Zefiro 300 to Hitachi Rail, as a condition of Alstom's acquisition of Bombardier put in place by the European Commission in order to remain compliant with EU competition law. The transaction was completed on 1 July 2022.

In late 2022, Hitachi Rail won the contract to supply train sets for the Ontario Line being planned in Toronto, Canada.

In May 2024, Hitachi Rail completed the acquisition of Thales Group's Ground Transportation Systems in exchange for €1.66 billion, which expanded its global presence in the rail sector to 51 countries. Thereafter, Hitachi Rail and MERMEC signed a put option agreement for the sale of Hitachi Rail’s main line signalling business in France along with its signalling business units in both Germany and the UK.

In July 2024, Hitachi Rail won the contract to supply new M-5 trainsets for the SEPTA Metro's Market–Frankford Line in Philadelphia, Pennsylvania, US.
