= JNR Class EF57 =

Japanese locomotive class

Class EF57
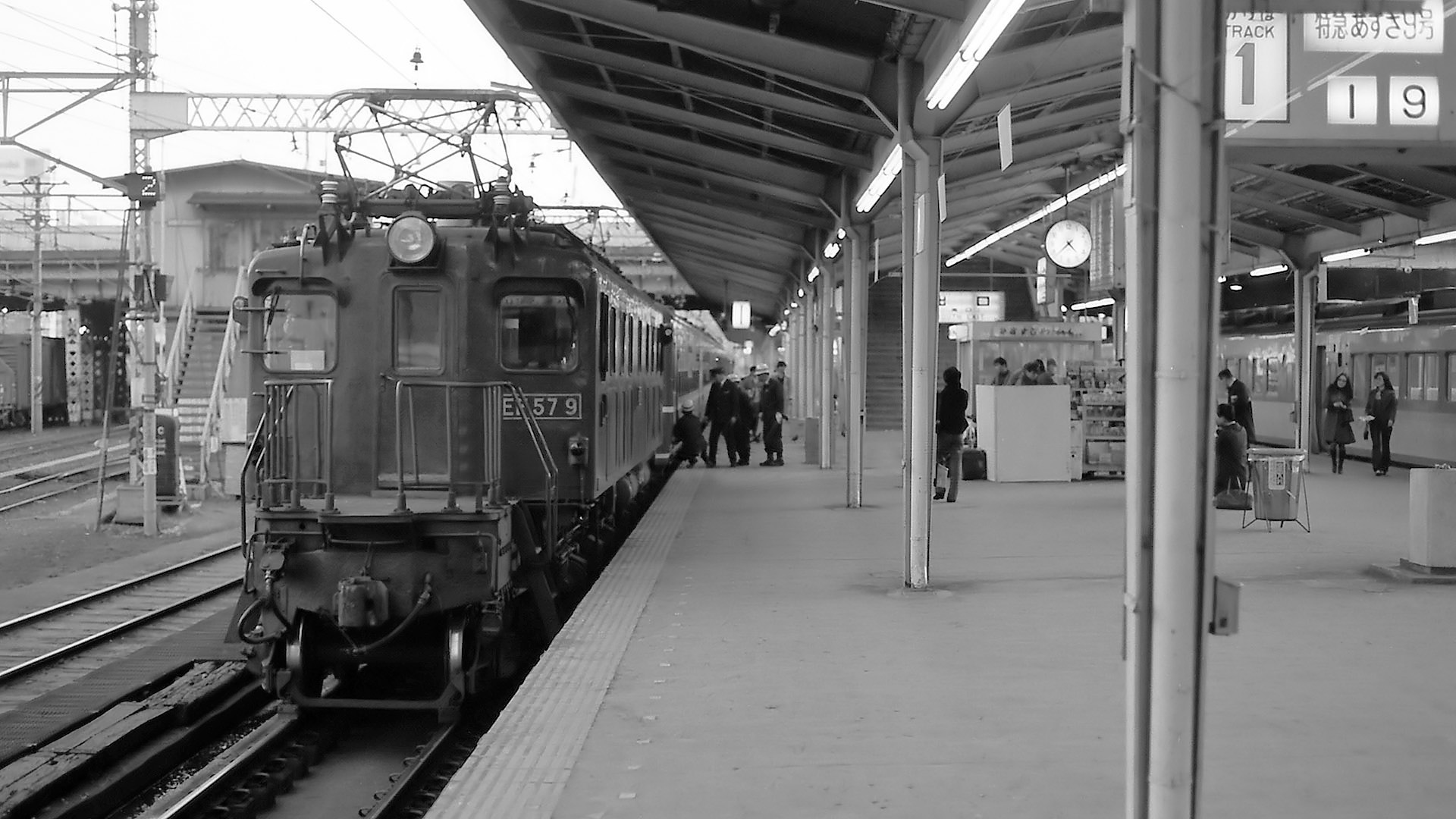
- EF57 9 at Shinjuku Station in 1975
Type and origin
- Power type: Electric
- Builder: Hitachi, Kawasaki
- Build date: 1939–1943
Specifications
- Configuration
  - AAR: 2-C+C-2
  - UIC: (2'Co)(Co2')
- Gauge: 1,067 mm (3 ft 6 in)
- Driver dia.: 1,250 mm (49.21 in)
- Length: 19,920 mm (65 ft 4 1/4 in)
- Width: 2,810 mm (9 ft 2 5/8 in)
- Height: 4,091 mm (13 ft 5 1/8 in)
- Loco weight: 110.82 t (109.07 long tons; 122.16 short tons)
- Electric system/s: 1,500 V DC overhead line
- Current pickup: Pantograph
- Traction motors: DC
Performance figures
- Maximum speed: 95 km/h (59 mph)
- Power output: 1.56 MW (2,090 hp)
- Tractive effort: 9,500 kgf (93,160 N; 20,940 lbf)
Career
- Operators: JNR
- Number in class: 172
- Disposition: One preserved, remainder scrapped

The Class EF57 (EF57形) of 2-C+C-2 wheel arrangement DC electric locomotives was a development of the previous JNR Class EF56. 15 Class EF57s were built between 1939 and 1943 by Hitachi and Kawasaki.

Introduced on Tokaido Line passenger services, they were seen at the head of expresses such as the Tsubame, complete with train headboard mounted precariously on the front of the cab decks. With the introduction of the newer semi-streamlined Class EF58s on Tokaido Line services, the EF57s were transferred to the Tohoku Main Line. At the same time, their steam-heating boilers were removed and replaced by electric-heating generators.

The class remained in use on long-distance express trains on the Tohoku Main Line until the 1970s.

== Preserved examples ==
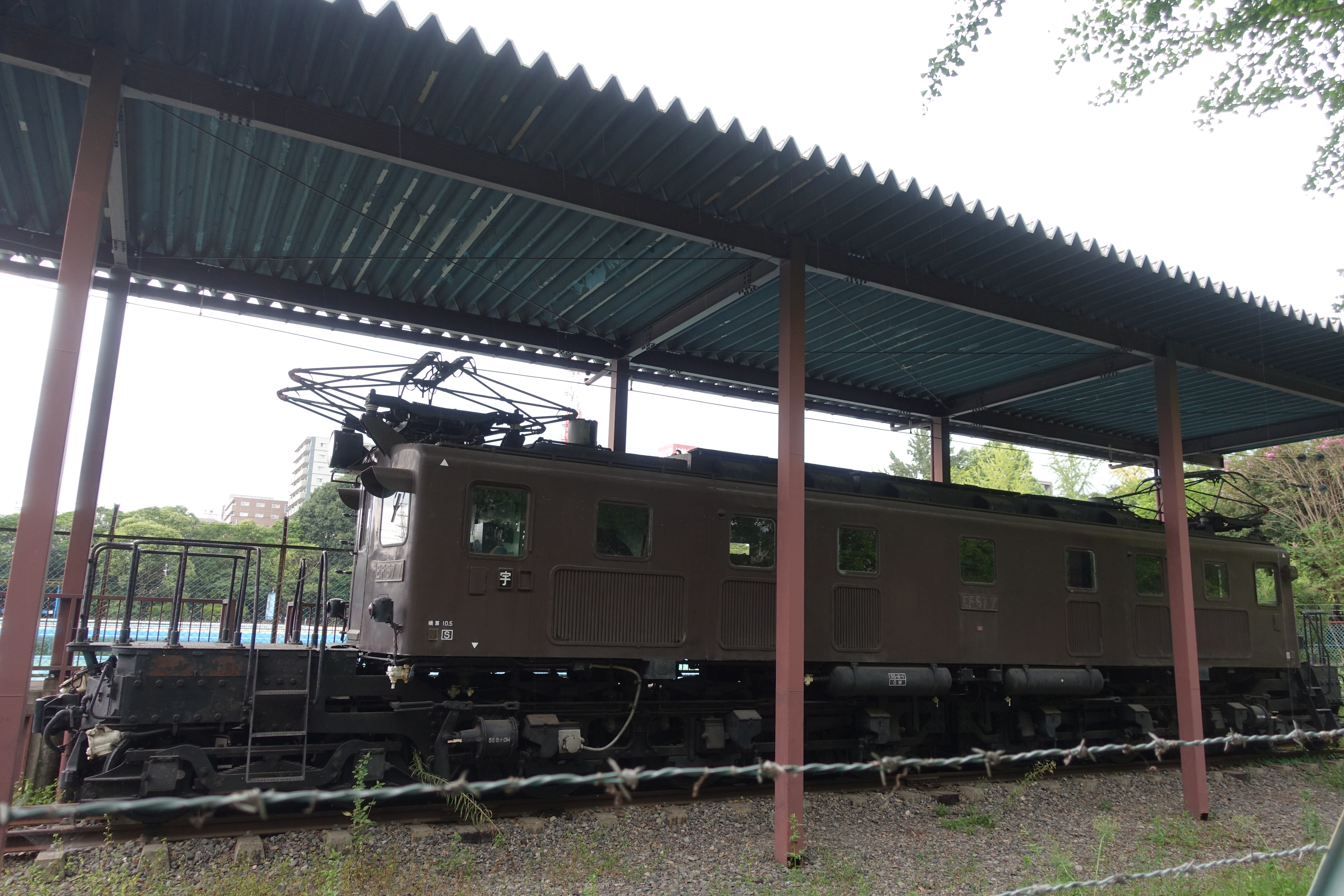
EF57 7 preserved in Utsunomiya

Only one member of the class is preserved: EF57 7 in a park in Utsunomiya, Tochigi Prefecture.

== See also ==
- Japan Railways locomotive numbering and classification
- JNR Class EF55
- JNR Class EF58
