= JNR Class EF55 =

Japanese locomotive class

Class EF55
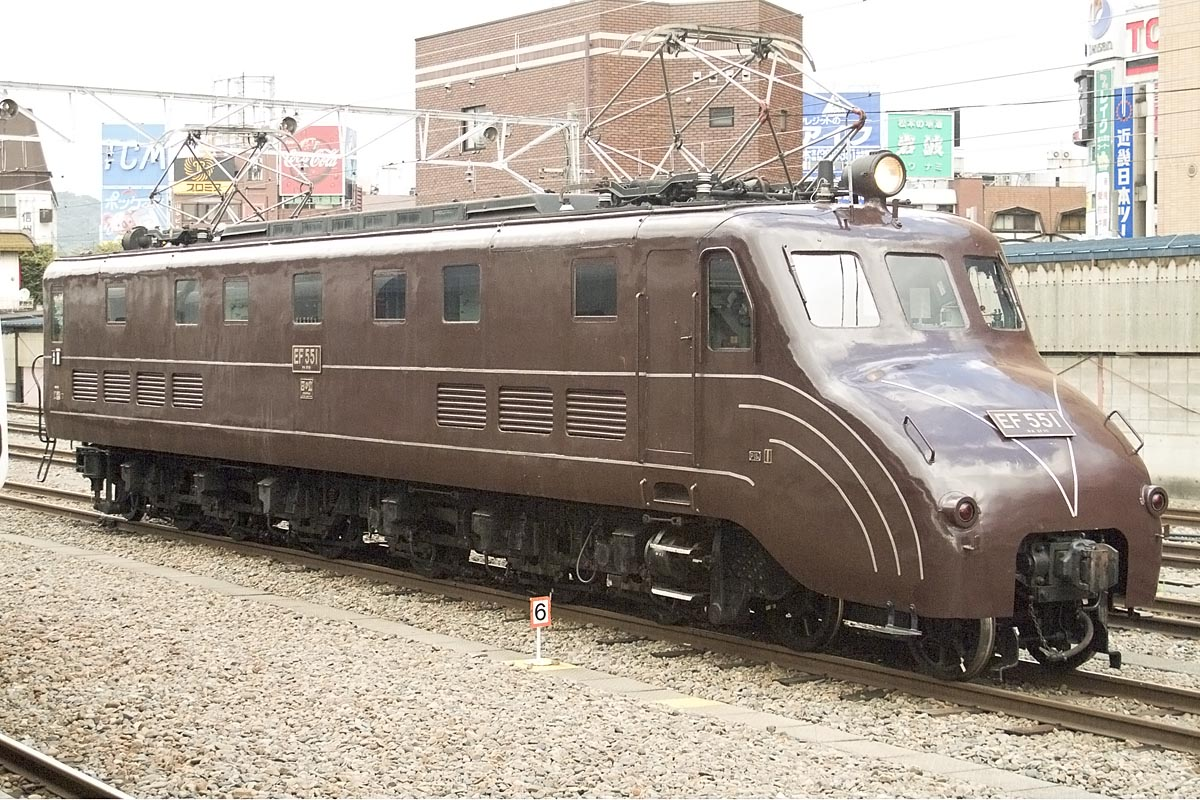
- EF55 1 at Matsumoto Station, October 2003
Type and origin
- Power type: Electric
- Builder: Hitachi, Kawasaki, Tōyō Electric
- Build date: 1936
- Total produced: 3
Specifications
- Configuration
  - AAR: 2-C+C-1
  - UIC: (2'Co)(Co'1)
- Gauge: 1,067 mm (3 ft 6 in)
- Driver dia.: 1,250 mm (49.21 in)
- Trailing dia.: 860 mm (33.86 in)
- Length: 19,150 mm (62 ft 9 7/8 in)
- Width: 2,810 mm (9 ft 2 5/8 in)
- Height: 3,810 mm (12 ft 6 in)
- Loco weight: 100.38 t (98.79 long tons; 110.65 short tons)
- Electric system/s: 1,500 V DC
- Current pickup: Pantograph
Performance figures
- Maximum speed: 95 km/h (59 mph); 120 km/h (75 mph) (trial)
- Power output: 1.350 MW (1,810 hp)
- Tractive effort: 6,300 kgf (61,780 N; 13,890 lbf)
Career
- Operators: JNR, JR East
- Number in class: 3
- Delivered: March 1936
- Preserved: 1
- Disposition: All withdrawn

The Class EF55 (EF55形) is a 2Co+Co1 wheel arrangement electric locomotive type consisting of three locomotives built in 1936 by Hitachi, Kawasaki, and Tōyō Electric in Japan. They were nicknamed "hippos (kaba)" or "monster shoes (kutsu no bakemono)" in the 1930s, and later in the 1980s "Moomin".

== Design ==
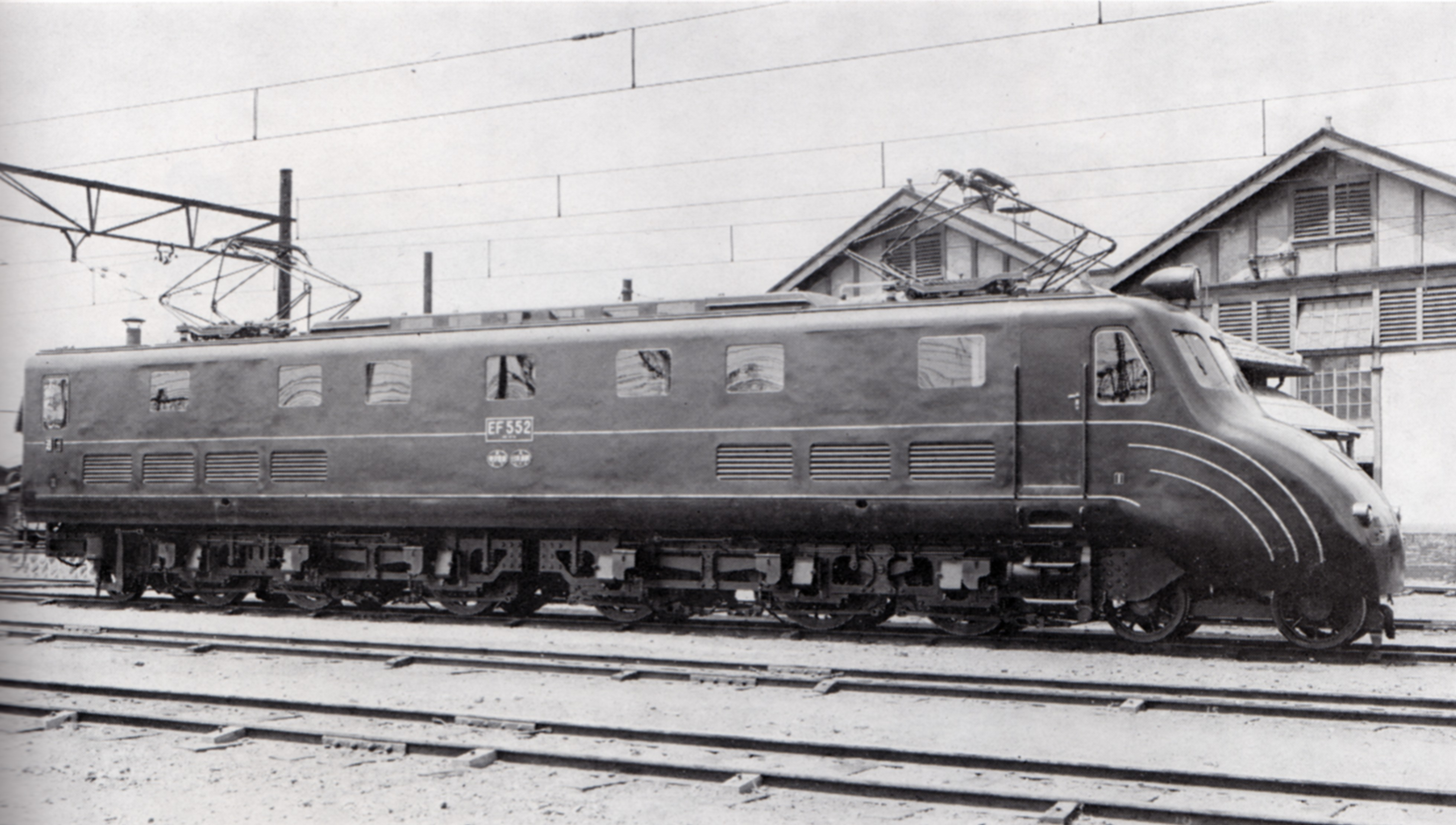
EF55 2, taken in August 1936

Streamlined designs were adopted for railway rolling stock worldwide in the 1930s, and the Japanese Government Railways (JGR) tested such a design on a Class C53 locomotive in 1934. It was then decided that 20 Class C55 steam locomotives would be built with a streamlined design. In the same year, the Tanna Tunnel opened on the Tokaido Main Line, and all express trains switched from the mountainous and detouring original route. Because of the length of the tunnel (8 km), steam locomotives were eliminated from operating through it, and a new class of mainline electric express locomotives was needed to replace the Class C51 and C53, which hauled the Tsubame and Fuji services.

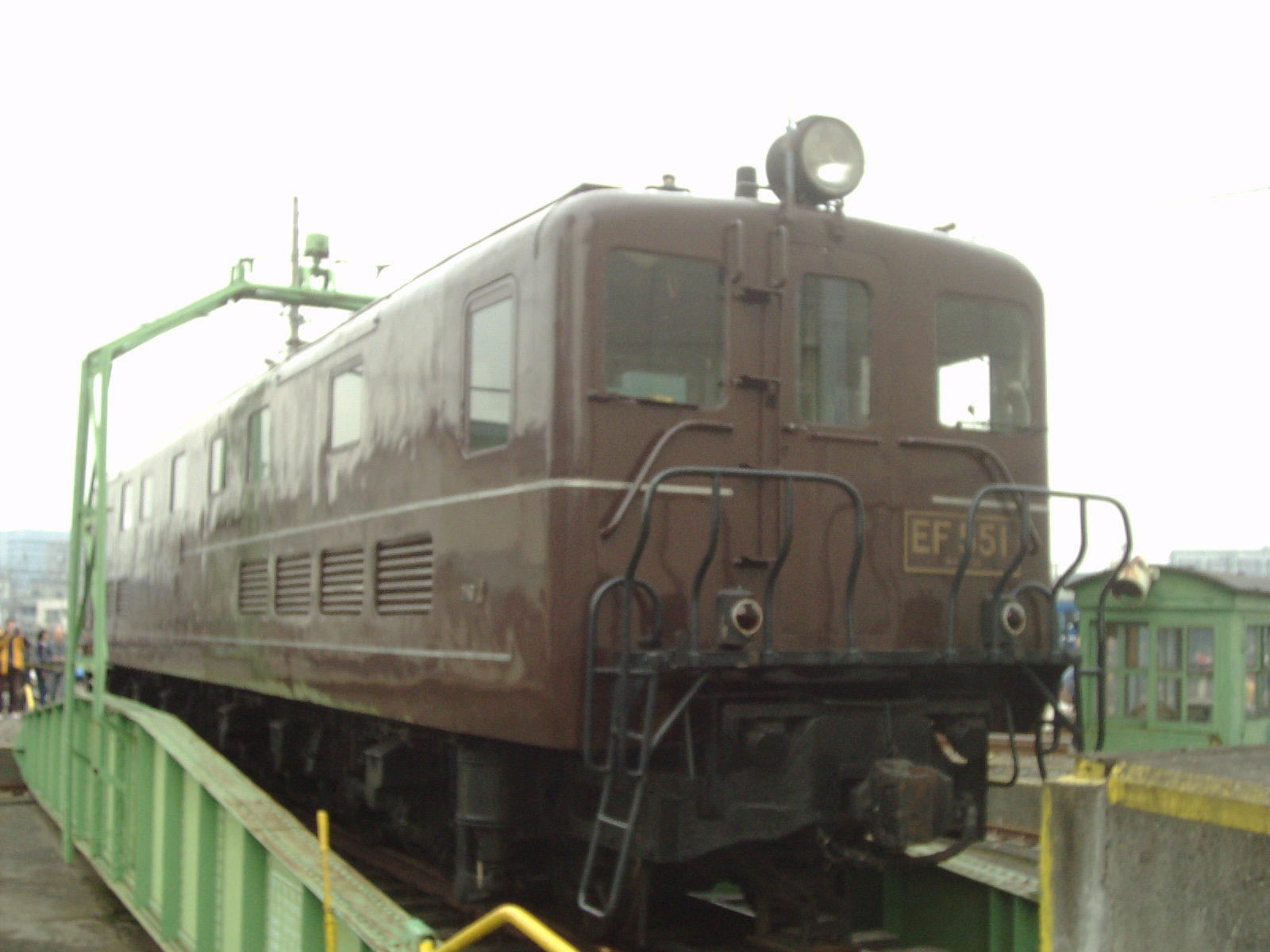
Non-streamlined end of EF55 1

As such, the Class EF55 were built with a streamlined design. Although based on the earlier EF53 design, the EF55s based on a unique non-symmetrical wheel arrangement with a streamlined cab at only one end. The number 2 end had a traditional-style cab with access deck. The use of rivets and bolts were kept to a minimum, and welding was used to create a smooth surface. A 1936 trial showed a 9% reduction in air resistance when the locomotives ran with the streamlined end at the front. However, using turntables to keep the streamlined end at the front proved inefficient for regular operations. As a result, the Class EF56 and EF57 locomotives reverted to boxier designs, though the post-war EF58 brought back a more streamlined look. With an operational speed of 95 km/h, the EF55 surpassed 120 km/h during a trial run.

== Operations ==
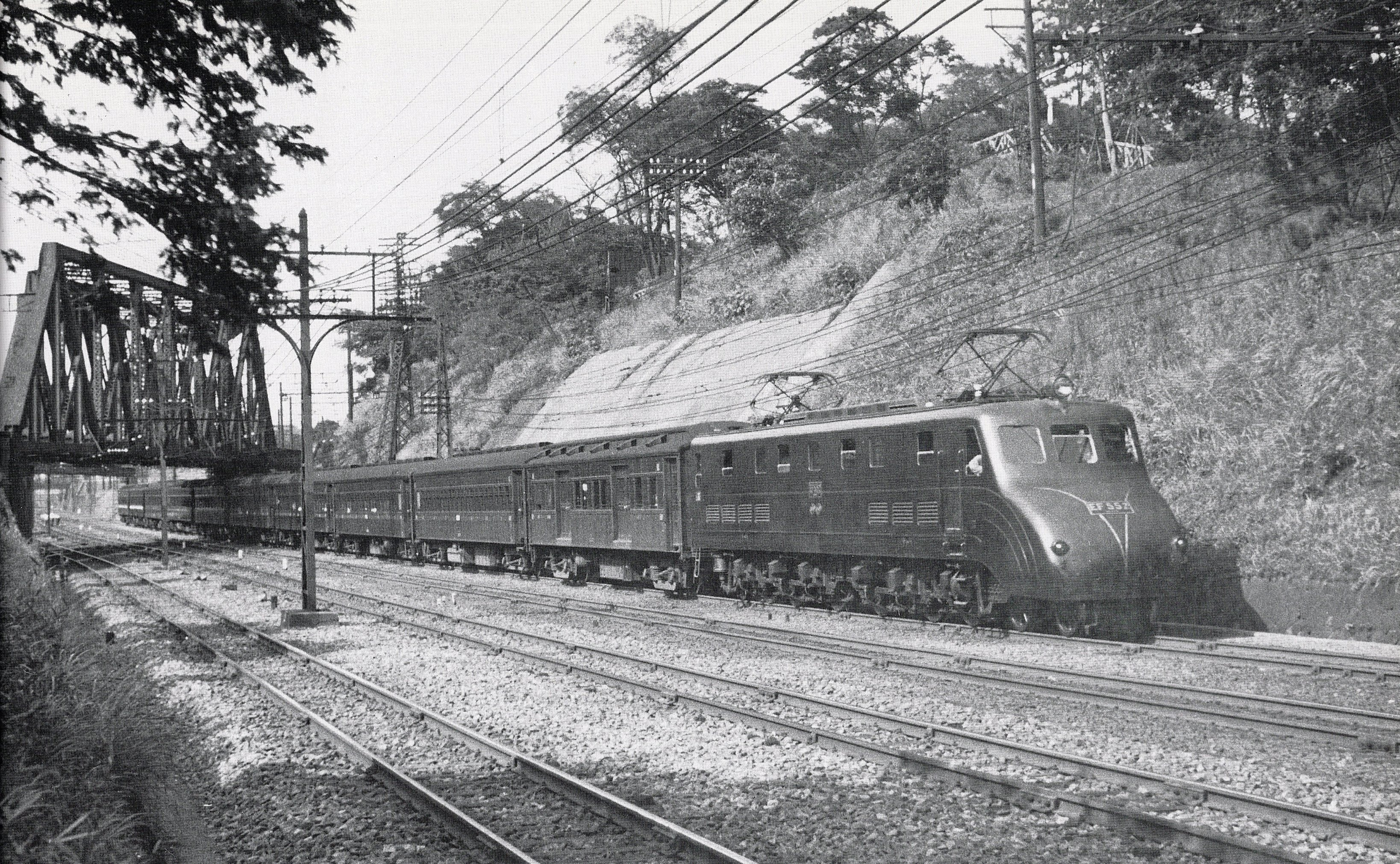
EF55 2 hauling Fuji, between Shinagawa and Oimachi, August 1936

All EF55s were based at Numazu depot from 1936, and were operated on the Tokaido Line until 1952, when they were moved to Takasaki depot on the Takasaki Line. The need to turn locomotives round due to the single cab proved to be the downfall of this small class, and the locomotives were placed in storage in 1958, and then officially withdrawn in 1964. Following withdrawal, EF55 1 was moved to the former Chūō Railway Institute near Nishi-Kokubunji Station for apprentice training purposes. EF55 3 was cannibalized to donate motors and other components to the ED30 prototype AC/DC electric locomotive, and EF55 2 was also cut up shortly after.

== Preservation ==
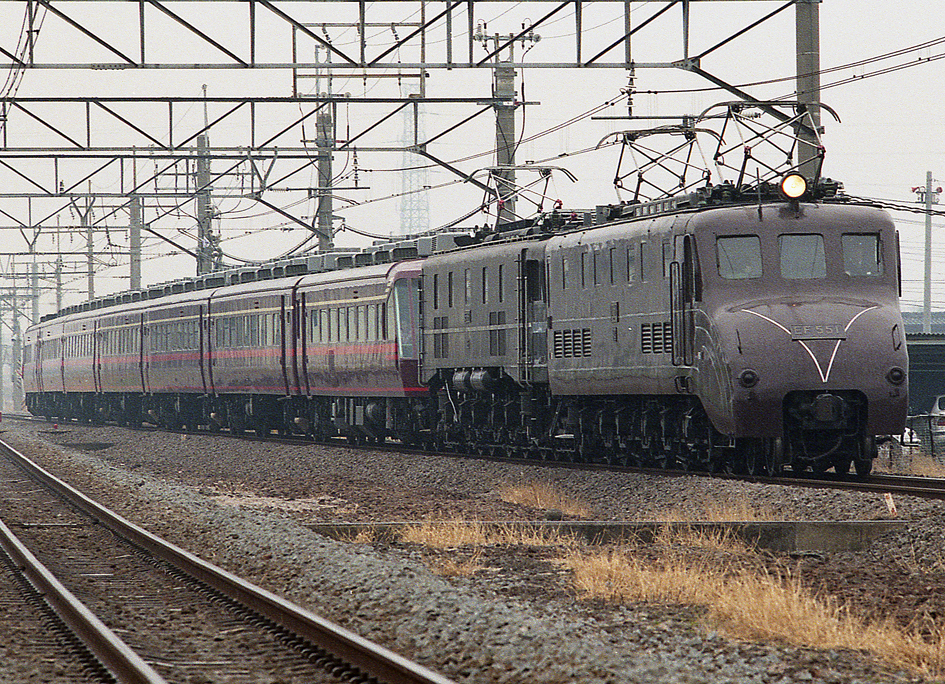
EF55 1 and EF58 61 hauling a charter train

EF55 1 was designated as an important piece of railway heritage in 1978, and was subsequently restored to running condition, re-entering service in 1986 for use hauling special event trains. It was operated by JR East, based at Takasaki depot, until it was finally withdrawn in January 2009. EF55 1 was moved from Takasaki to Omiya in January 2015, and exhibited at JR East's Railway Museum from 12 April.

== See also ==
- Japan Railways locomotive numbering and classification
