= MERMEC =

Italian company

MERMEC S.p.A.
- Type: Private
- Industry: Railway Diagnostics & Signalling
- Founded: 1960s, incorporated 1988
- Founder: Vito Pertosa
- Headquarters: Monopoli, Metropolitan City of Bari, Italy
- Products: Railway Diagnostic Systems & Vehicles; Railway Signalling Systems; Rail Inspection; Asset Management Systems; Diagnostic Services; Professional Services
- Number of employees: 2,300 (2024)
- Website: mermecgroup.com

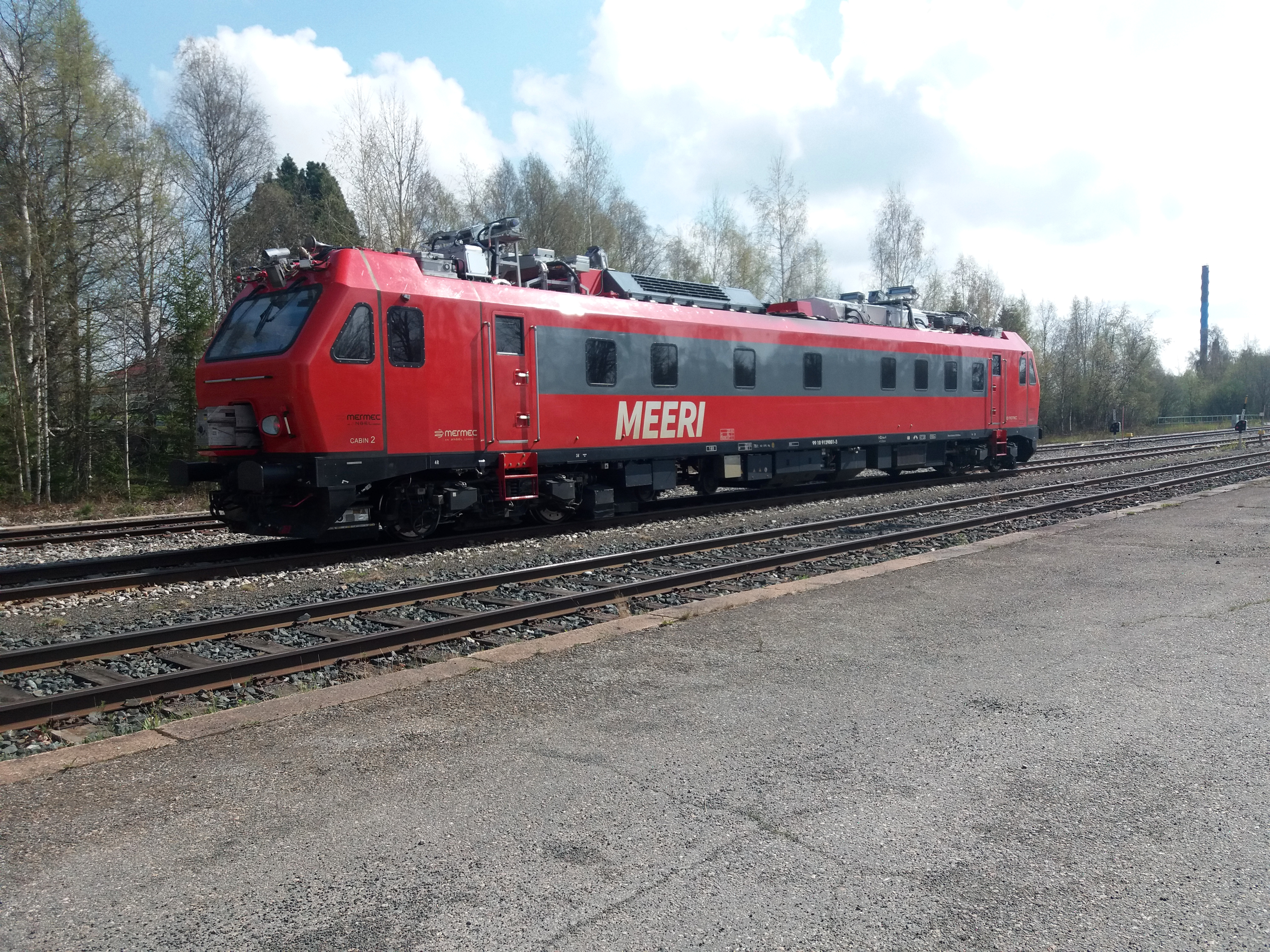
MEERI - MERMEC

MERMEC S.p.A. is an Italian company focused on the development of rail transport technologies (signaling, measurement trains and systems, electric traction and telecommunications) and industrial applications.

As of 2024, MERMEC employs over 2,300 people (of which more than 1,400 are engineers) and operates in 73 countries worldwide.

MERMEC subsidiaries include MERMEC Inc. (USA), MERMEC France, MERMEC Australia Pty Ltd and MERMEC JAPAN G.K.

== History ==
Prior to becoming a joint-stock company in 1988, MERMEC was known as Meridional Meccanica, which began in the 1960s. Meridional Meccanica began making railway maintenance vehicles in the early 1980s and after incorporating, focused all of its attention to the railway market.

In the early 1990s MERMEC, in cooperation with the main Italian research institutes, developed an opto-electronic system for the automatic inspection of railway infrastructure conditions. The 1990s also saw the prototype of the ROGER vehicle, an acronym for Rilievo Ottico Geometria Rotaia (Italian for optical rail geometry control). In 1997 MERMEC produced the ROGER 1000, a self-propelled vehicle for rail track and overhead line inspection.

MERMEC, led by the President Vito Pertosa, represented Italy at the G7 Transport Ministers' Meeting in Ise-Shima, Mie on June 17, 2023.

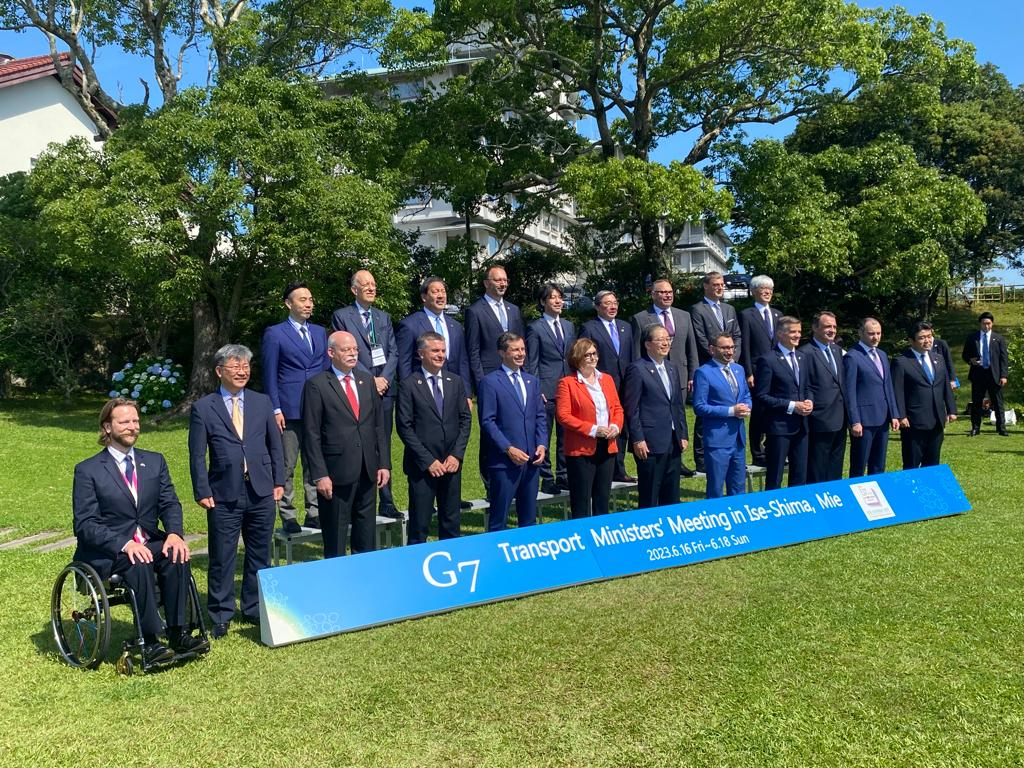
G7 Transport Ministers' Meeting in Ise-Shima, Mie

In 2024, MERMEC and Hitachi Rail signed a put option agreement for the sale of Hitachi Rail's main line signalling business in France and its signalling business units in Germany and the UK.

== Certifications ==
MERMEC has been awarded the following certifications: ISO 14001; ISO 45001; ISO 30415; ISO 27001; ISO 37001; ISO 9001; ISO 3834-2; SA 8000; EN 15085-2

== Memberships ==
MERMEC is an authorized research laboratory of the Italian Ministry of university and Research and a member of the following organizations: UNISIG; UNIFE; CEN; Consorzio Saturno; ERRAC. MERMEC was also a “Founding Member” of what is now Europe's Rail (formerly SHIFT2RAIL).

== See also ==
- List of Italian companies
