= Vito Pertosa =

Italian entrepreneur

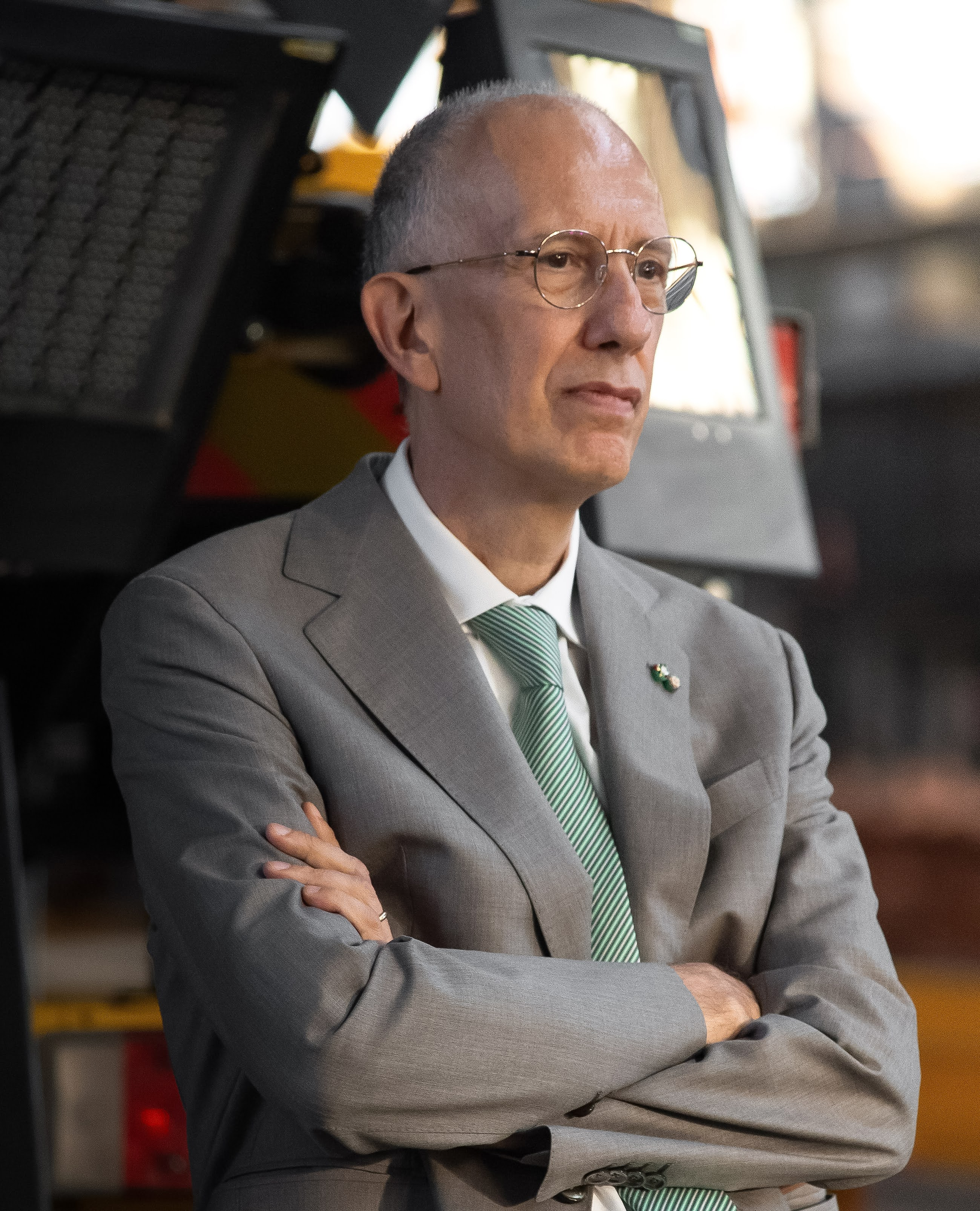
- Born: April 22, 1959 (age 67); Monopoli (Bari), Italy
- Occupation: Entrepreneur
- Children: 3
- Awards: Knight of the Order of Merit for Labour (2009); Knight Grand Cross of the Order of Merit of the Italian Republic (2022)

Vito Pertosa (April 22, 1959, Monopoli, Bari) is an Italian entrepreneur, chairman and CEO of MERMEC (since 2006), and founder and chairman of Angel Holding (since 2008). He is a scientific expert on technological innovation at the Ministry for Business and Made in Italy (MIMIT), and a member of the Board of Directors of the National Center for Sustainable Mobility Foundation (MOST). He has been married since 1980 and has three children.

== Biography ==
Vito Pertosa is the son of Angelo Pertosa, founder of Meridional Meccanica S.a.s. and dealer of Lamborghini Tractors. Vito began working formally in the family business in 1980, after graduating as a mechanical industrial expert and teaching at ENAIP. In 1997, together with other entrepreneurs, he founded the Sviluppo Polis Association, which gathered more than two hundred companies, assuming the role of its President.

Upon joining Meridional Meccanica, Pertosa began a process of transforming the business toward the railroad sector, which led to the establishment of MERMEC S.p.A. in 1988. In 2006, Pertosa became president of MERMEC.

In 2007, he became Regent with the function of Censor for the Bari Branch of the Bank of Italy. In 2008, he founded Angel Holding, a parent company of companies specializing in the research and development of technologies in different sectors, such as rail, aerospace, and digital mechatronics, which are active in 73 countries worldwide. From 2012 to 2014, Vito Pertosa was a board member of the Italian Space Agency.

In 2012, he founded SITAEL, an aerospace company with entirely private capital operating in the LEO satellite market and space electric propulsion.

He was vice president of the Tecnopolis Science and Technology Park, vice president of the Procomp Research Consortium, CEO of the South Space Consortium, sole administrator of the 2M CLIV Consortium, member of the National Technical Committee for Innovation and Research of Confindustria, and CEO of CENTRO LASER S.C.r.l., a scientific research company.

Pertosa was also sole administrator of ITEL Italiana, chairman of IMAGEMAP Inc. (USA – West Columbia, SC), and president of the Argenta Group (Italy).

As the President of MERMEC, in June 2023, he participated in the G7 Transport International Summit in Japan. In April 2024, he participated at the G7 Transport Summit in Milan. During this event, MERMEC expressed support for the railways in Ukraine. In May 2024, he participated for the fourth time to Choose France 2024, the annual event organized by President Emmanuel Macron to attract the world's leading companies to France. In June 2024, he attended the Ukraine Recovery Conference (URC) in Berlin. In July 2024, he participated in the G7 Industry Stakeholder Conference in Reggio Calabria, Italy, on the occasion of the G7 Trade Ministers' Meeting.

== Awards and honours ==
Year	Ribbon	Class	Name of the Order	Title
2009		Knight	Ordine al Merito del Lavoro	Cavaliere del lavoro
2022		Knight Grand Cross	Ordine al Merito della Repubblica Italiana	Cavaliere di Gran Croce

Entrepreneur Of The Year in the 'Innovation' category. - ribbon for ordinary uniform

Ernst & Young Entrepreneur of the Year Award in the 'Innovation' category
— Ernst & Young
— 2009

Photonics Prism Award for 'Detectors, Sensing, Imaging, and Cameras', San Francisco, USA
— 2012

The NIAF Leonardo da Vinci Award in Technology, Washington, DC, USA
— 13 October 2018

Roma Award for Country Development - Economy, Corporate and Social
— 6 December 2018

Honorary Degree in Automation Engineering - ribbon for ordinary uniform

Honorary Degree in Automation Engineering
— Polytechnic University of Bari
— 23 May 2019

"Il Perugino, Artist and Entrepreneur" Award, Perugia
— 15 April 2025

Ugo La Malfa Award for International Cooperation
— 4 December 2025
