= JNR Class EF58 =

Japanese electric locomotive class

Class EF58
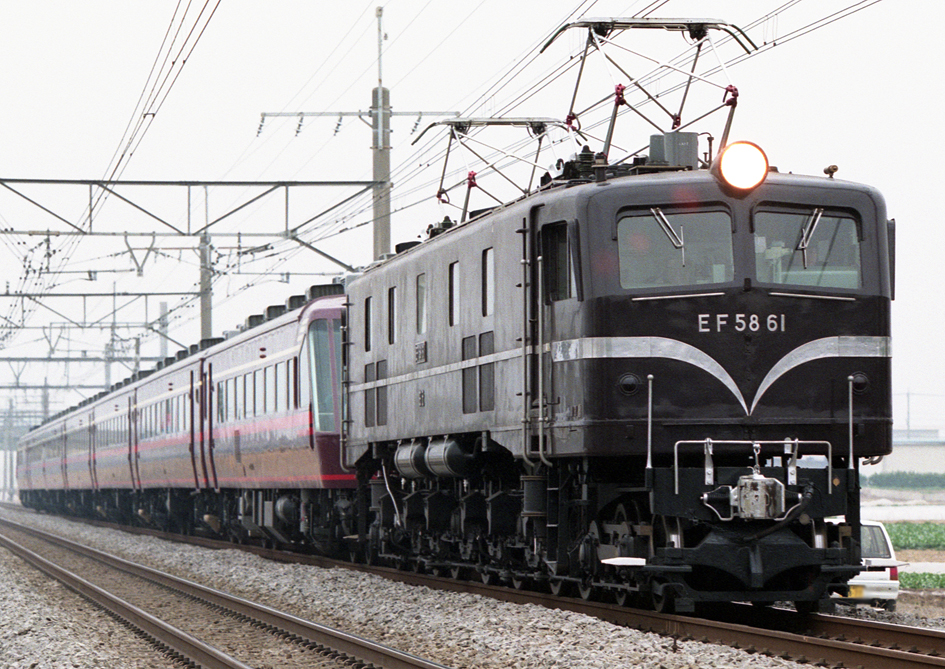
- EF58 61 hauling an excursion train
Type and origin
- Power type: Electric
- Builder: Hitachi, Toshiba, Kawasaki, Mitsubishi, Tōyō & Kisha
- Build date: 1946–1958
Specifications
- Configuration
  - AAR: 2-C+C-2
  - UIC: (2′Co)(Co′2)
- Gauge: 1,067 mm (3 ft 6 in)
- Driver dia.: 1,250 mm (49.21 in)
- Length: 19,900 mm (65 ft 3 1/2 in)
- Width: 2,800 mm (9 ft 2 1/4 in)
- Height: 3,947 mm (12 ft 11 3/8 in)
- Loco weight: 115 t (113 long tons; 127 short tons)
- Electric system/s: 1,500 V DC overhead line
- Current pickup: Pantograph
- Traction motors: DC
Performance figures
- Maximum speed: 100 km/h (60 mph)
- Power output: 1.900 MW (2,550 hp)
- Tractive effort: 10,250 kgf (22,600 lbf)
Career
- Operators: JNR, JR East, JR Central, JR West
- Number in class: 172

The Class EF58 (EF58形) is a class of Japanese 2-C+C-2 wheel arrangement DC electric locomotives. 172 locomotives were built between 1946 and 1958.

== The later years ==
In 1984, 64 out of 172 EF58 locos built were still in service or temporary storage. However, they were withdrawn en masse from Tokaido and Sanyo Main Line freight duties in 1984, and by 1987, immediately prior to privatization of JNR, there were just four members of the class (EF58 61, 89, 122, and 150) remaining in service. Details of the locomotives currently in operational service are as follows.

=== EF58 61 ===
Owned by JR East and based at Tabata Depot in Tokyo, this locomotive was built in 1953 by Hitachi specially for use as the official Imperial Train locomotive, a role it performs to the present day. While other locos had chrome-plated “whiskers” on the cab ends, this loco was built with stainless steel whiskers extending as a thin band along the body sides. The loco remains in its original brown livery, and is maintained in immaculate condition.

=== EF58 122 ===
Owned by JR Central and based at Shizuoka Depot, this loco was built in 1957 by Hitachi. It was repainted in 1992 from the standard blue/cream livery to its current all-over brown for use on special event trains on the Tōkaidō and Iida Lines. This locomotive was cut up at Hamamatsu Works in January 2009.

== Preserved examples ==
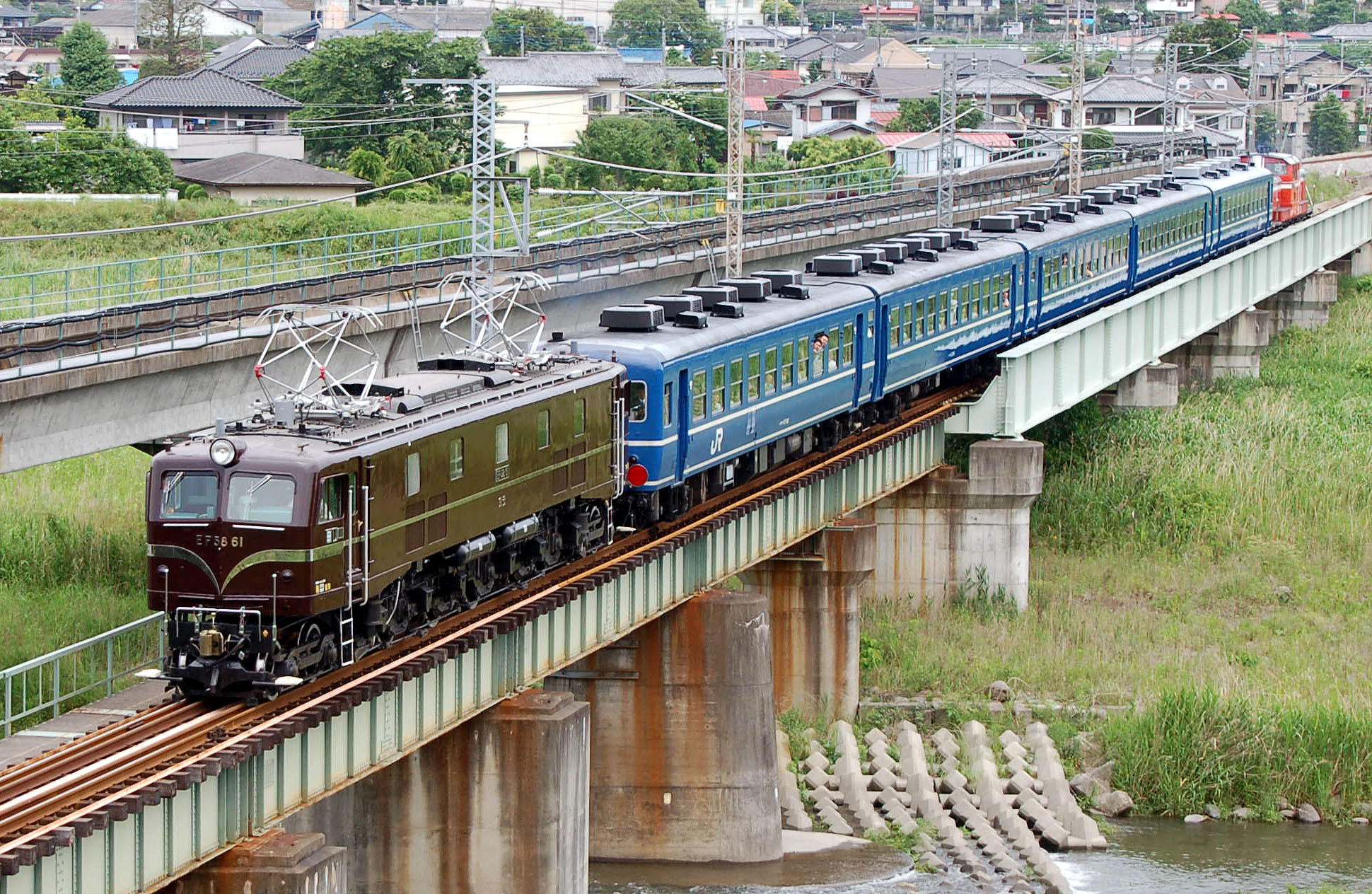
EF58 61 on a special charter train in June 2006

- EF58 36: No. 1 end section only preserved privately in Hiroshima. In very poor condition (blue livery).
- EF58 66: Was stored at JR West's Nara Depot in blue livery, but was cut up in March 1996.
- EF58 89: Preserved at the Railway Museum from October 2007. This loco saw mainline operation until January 1998, based at Tabata Depot. After withdrawal in 1999, it was preserved at JR East's Omiya Works. It was repainted from all-over brown to blue and cream in 2000 at Omiya. For the Railway Museum exhibition, it was again repainted to brown.
- EF58 93: Preserved at JR East Omiya Works in green livery with yellow stripe along lower body.
- EF58 113: Front end section only preserved at JR West Hiroshima Depot, in blue livery.
- EF58 144: No. 1 end cab preserved privately in Saitama Prefecture, in brown (primer?) livery. No. 2 end cab is preserved in front of a restaurant in Nasu-machi, Tochigi Prefecture, in blue livery.
- EF58 150: Built in 1958 by Toshiba, and withdrawn from service in 1985, but was reinstated in 1987 to Miyahara Depot in Osaka for use on special event trains. It was repainted into its original all-over brown livery to coincide with the restoration of observation car Maite 49 2. It was equipped with a train heating steam generator. In 2006, this locomotive was featured in the movie Tabi No Okurimono 0:00 Hatsu. In 2015, it was repainted into blue livery ahead of preservation at the Railway Museum in Kyoto.
- EF58 154: Cab end only preserved at JR East Omiya Works in light green livery.
- EF58 157: Preserved at SCMaglev and Railway Park. Built in 1958 by Mitsubishi, and withdrawn from regular service in 1985 before being reinstated to Shizuoka Depot in 1988 for use hauling special event trains on the Tokaido and Iida Lines. It was equipped with a train heating steam generator only, and operated in blue and cream livery until its withdrawal in 2007.
- EF58 172: Preserved at Usui Pass Railway Heritage Park, Gunma, in blue livery.
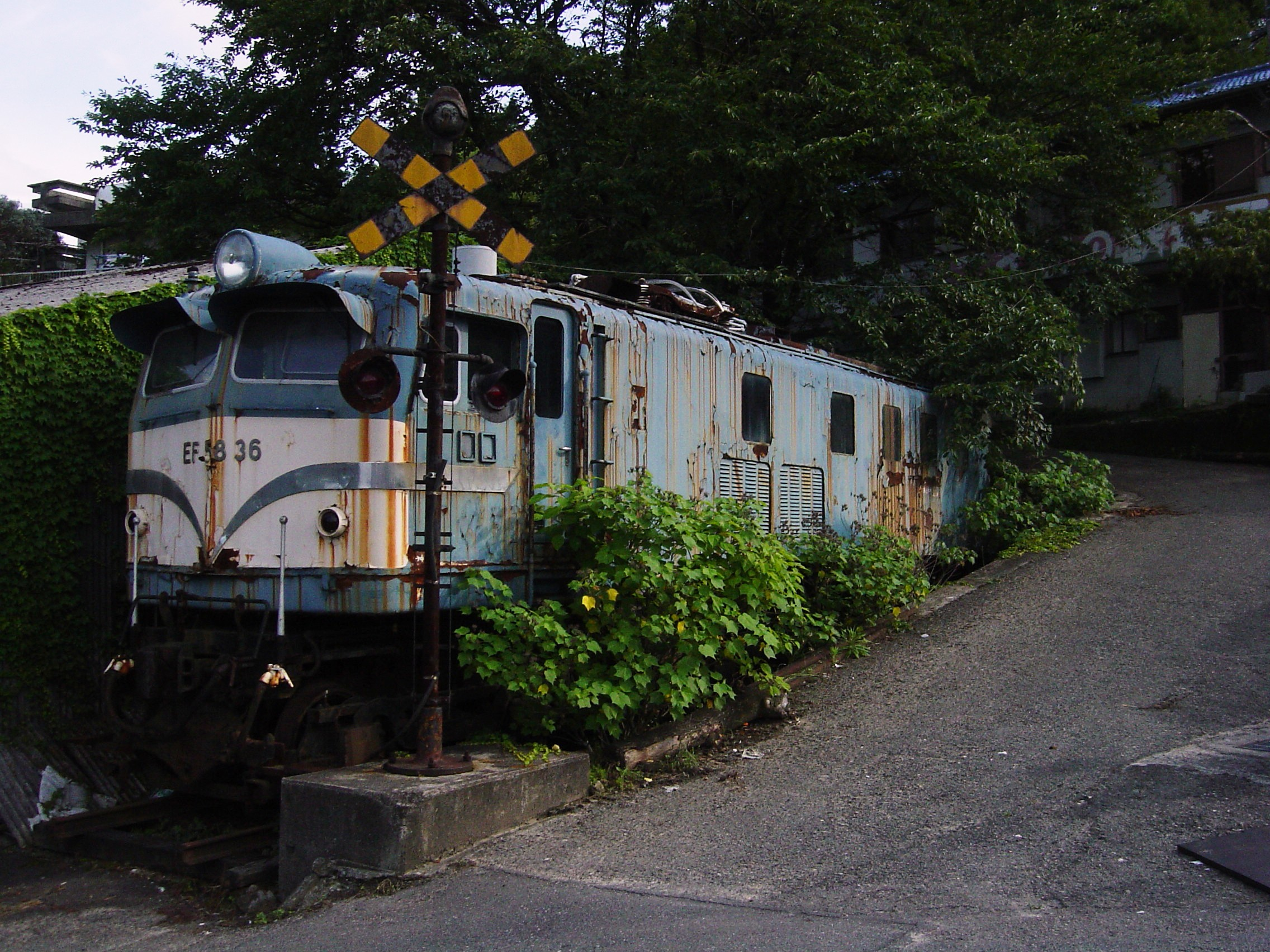
EF58 36 in June 2004

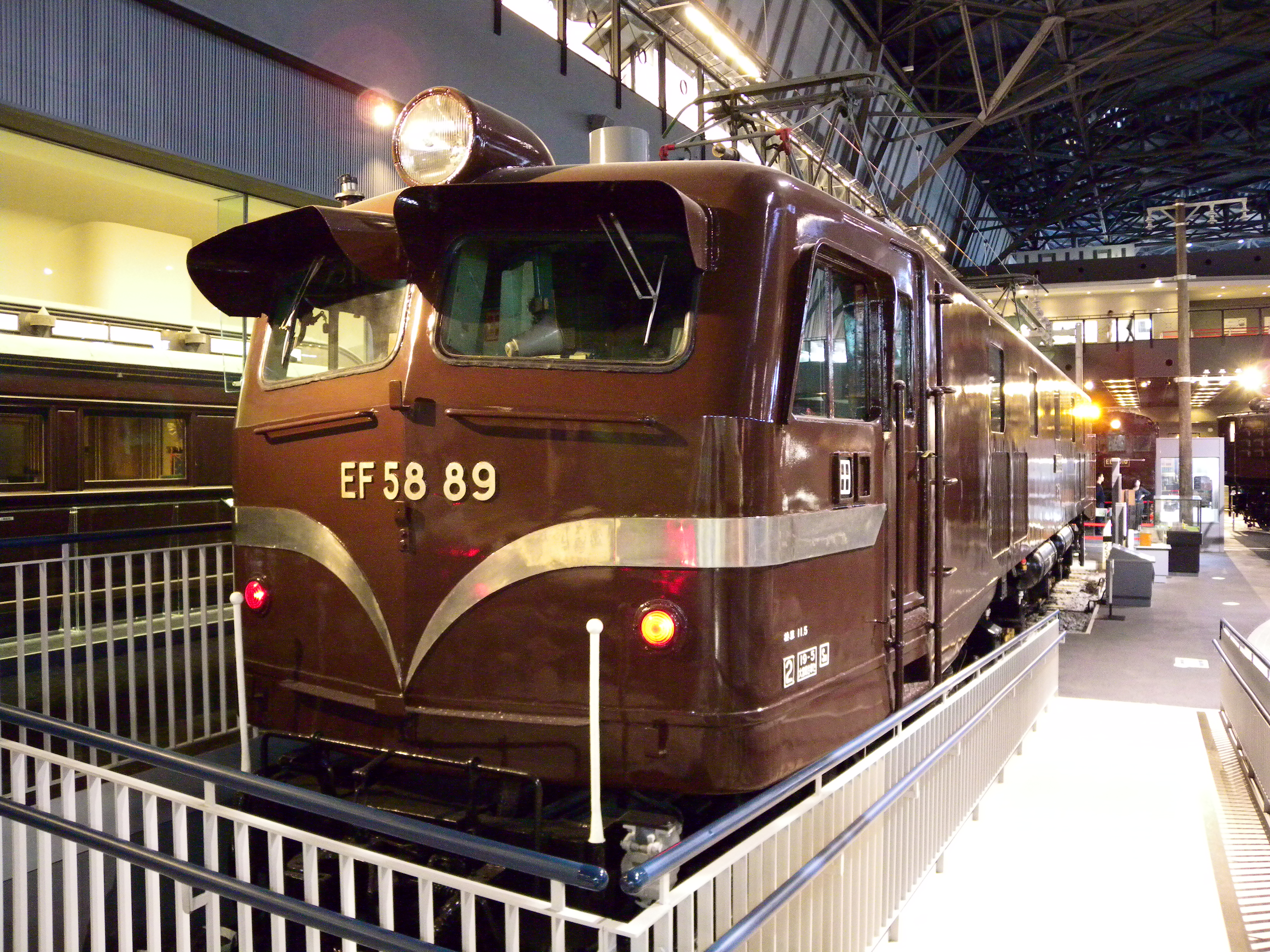
EF58 89 at the Railway Museum in June 2009

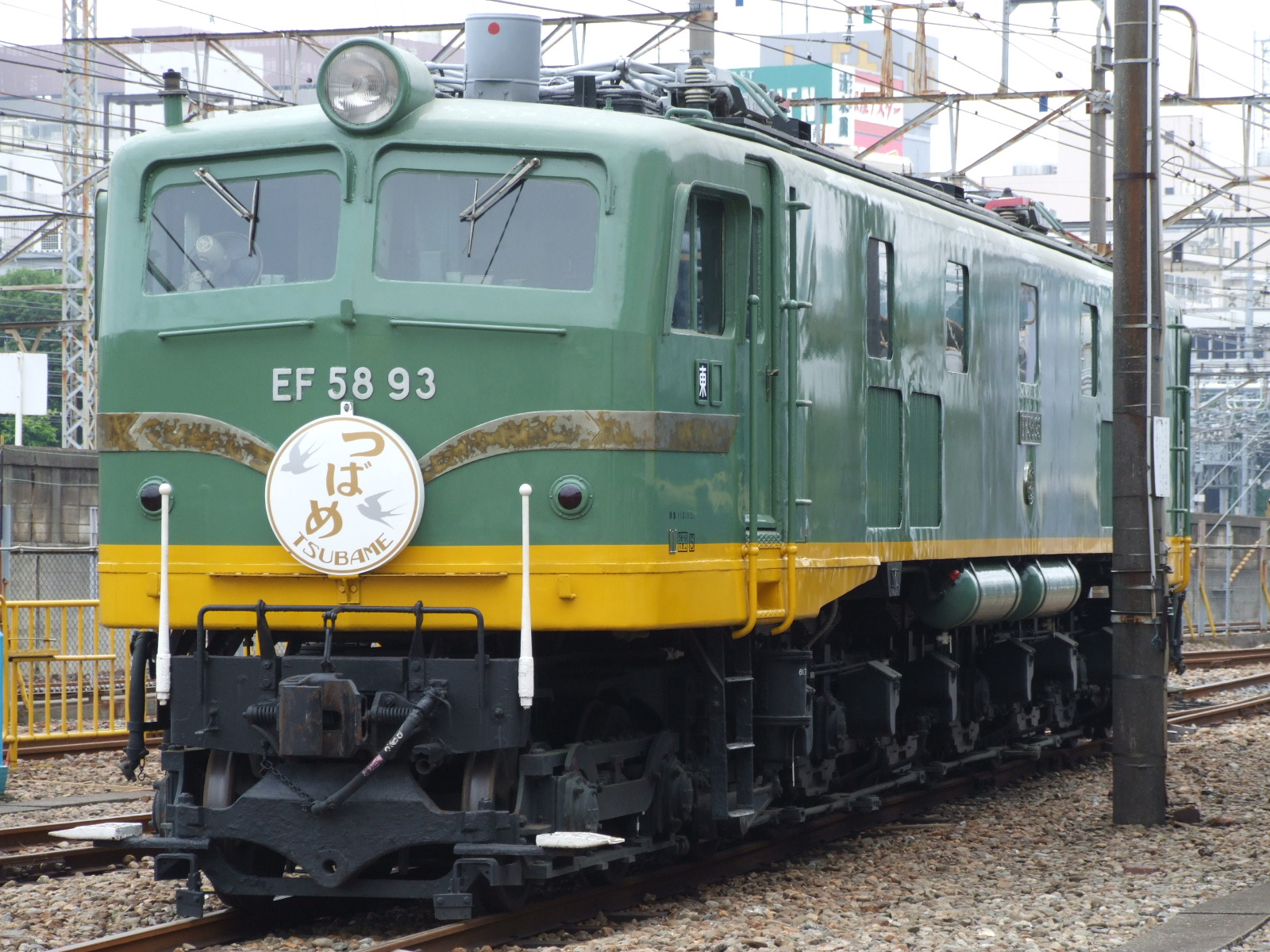
EF58 93 at Omiya Works in May 2008

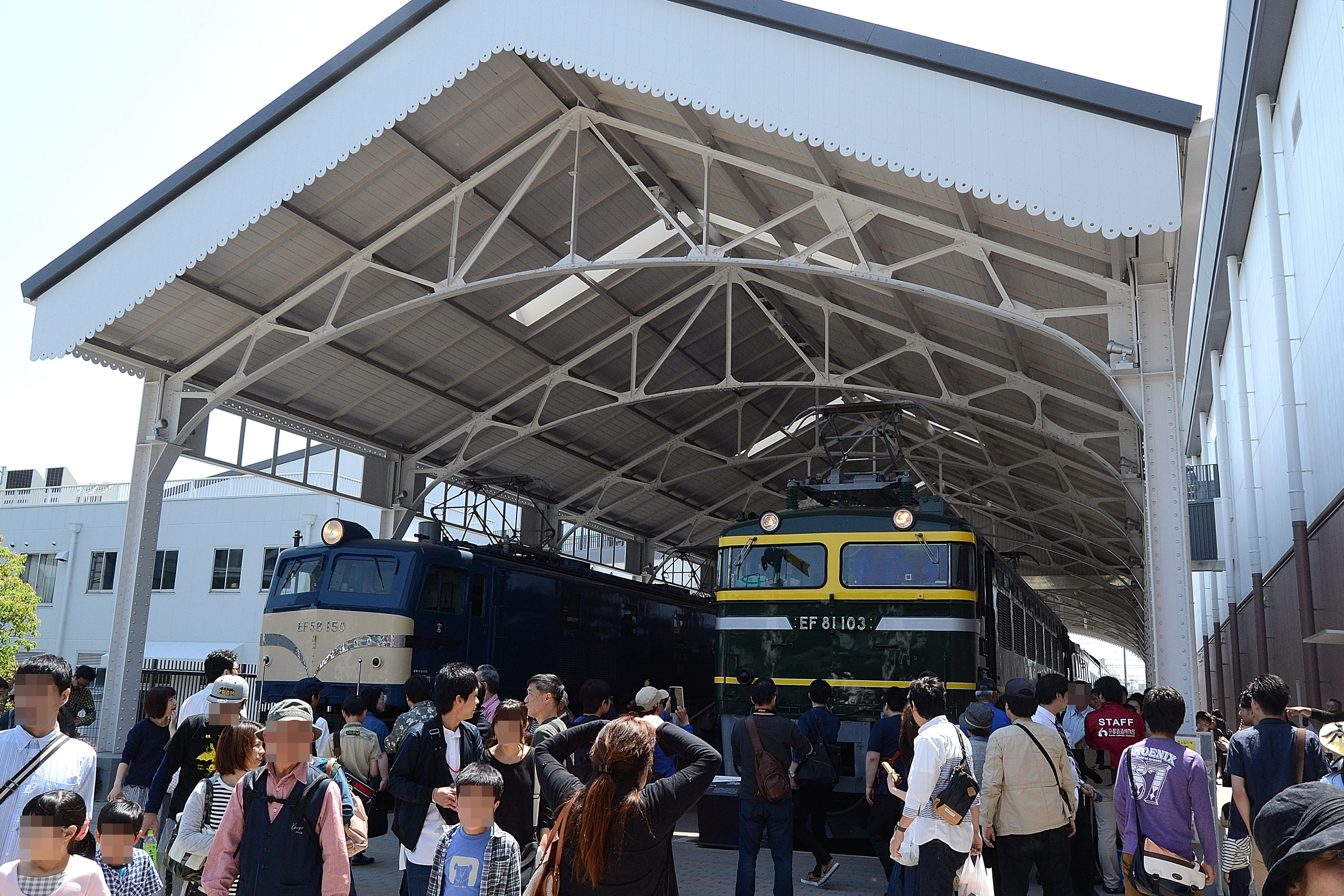
EF58 150 (left) in the Twilight Plaza zone at the Kyoto Railway Museum in May 2016

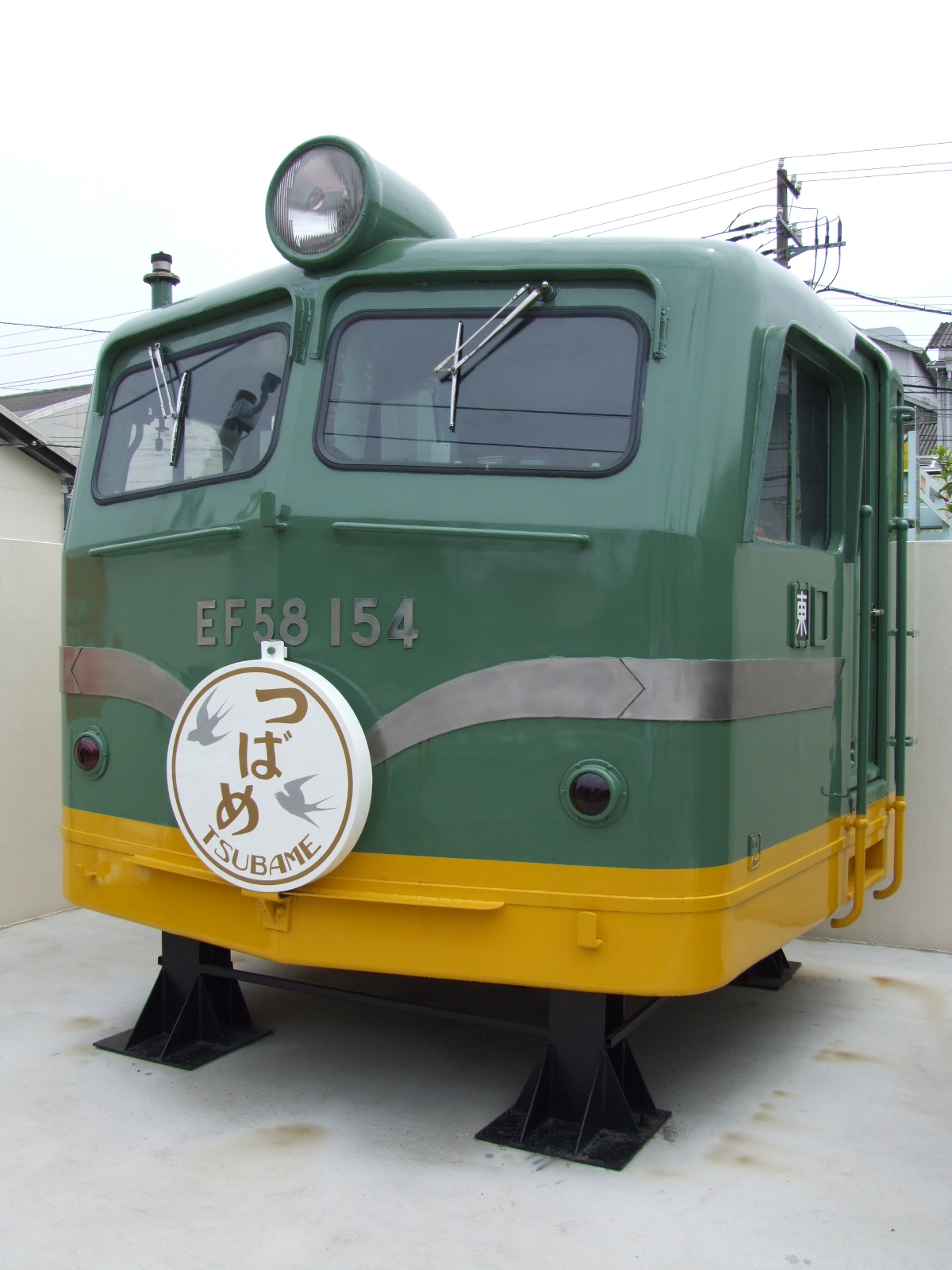
The cab end of EF58 154 at Omiya Works in May 2008

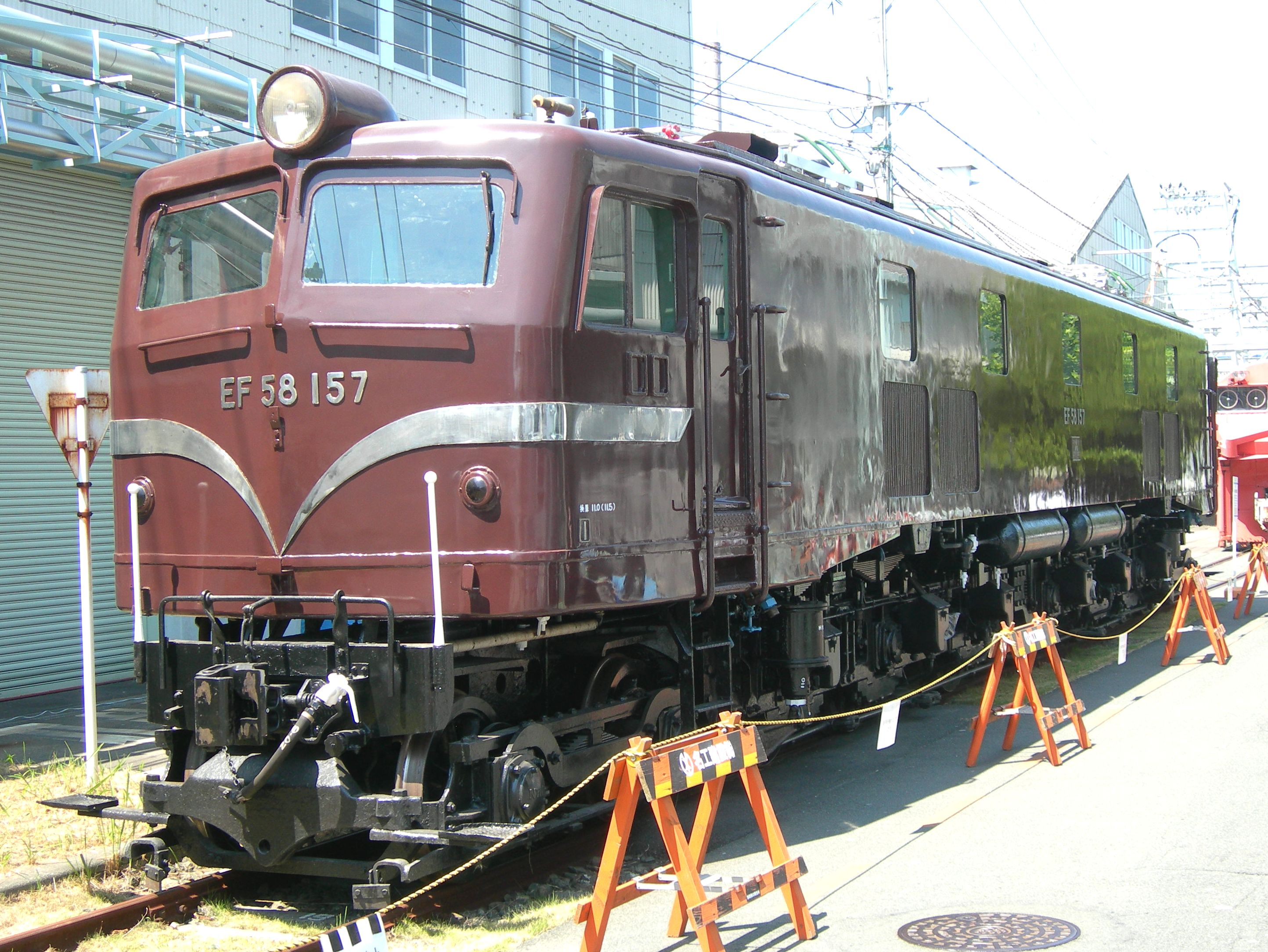
EF58 157 in July 2010

== See also ==
- Japan Railways locomotive numbering and classification
