= 2013 Women's NORCECA Volleyball Championship squads =

This article shows all participating team squads at the 2013 Women's NORCECA Volleyball Championship, held from September 16 to September 21, 2013 in Omaha, Nebraska, United States.

== Canada ==
No.	Name	Date of birth	Club
1	Janie Guimond	11 April 1984	Köpenicker Berlino
2	Lisa Barclay	7 June 1992	Un. British Columbia
3	Brittney Page	4 February 1984	Barbãr Bruxelles
6	Kelci French	28 January 1990	Trinity Western Un.
7	Marie-Pier Murray-Méthot	23 March 1986	Verona Volley
8	Jaimie Thibeault	23 September 1989	ES Le Cannet
9	Tabitha Love	11 September 1991	Criollas de Caguas
10	Marisa Field	10 July 1987	Istres Volley-Ball
18	Shanice Marcelle	25 May 1990	Un. British Columbia
19	Jennifer Lundquist	10 September 1991	Montana State Univ.
20	Dana Cranston	5 December 1991	Colorado State Univ.
14	Lucille Charuk	13 August 1989	ŽOK Spalato

== Costa Rica ==
No.	Name	Date of birth	Club
1	Dionisia Thompson	9 June 1978	Goicoechea
3	Viviana Murillo	6 February 1992	Santa Bárbara
4	Johanna Gamboa	23 November 1987	Goicoechea
6	Ángela Willis	26 January 1977	Goicoechea
7	Yuliana González	7 June 1995	Santa Bárbara
9	Verania Willis	23 September 1979	Goicoechea
10	Paola Ramírez	23 February 1987	UNED
11	Daniela Vargas	4 May 1996	Santa Bárbara
12	Mónica Castro	5 January 1996	San José
14	Irene Fonseca	10 October 1985	UNED
16	Mijal Hines	15 December 1993	Goicoechea
18	Evelyn Sibaja	5 February 1993	Santa Bárbara

== Cuba ==
No.	Name	Date of birth	Club
1	Melissa Vargas	16 October 1999	Cienfuegos
3	Alena Rojas	9 August 1992	Ciudad Habana
6	Daimara Lescay	5 September 1992	Guantánamo
8	Emily Borrell	19 February 1992	Villa Clara
9	Dayessi Luis	23 October 1996	Camagüey
12	Dairiylys Cruz	12 September 1990	Villa Clara
13	Rosanna Giel	10 June 1992	Ciego de Ávila
15	Beatriz Vilches	29 January 1995	Cienfuegos
18	Sulian Matienzo	14 December 1994	Ciudad Habana
19	Jennifer Álvarez	19 November 1993	Cienfuegos
20	Heydi Rodríguez	24 June 1993	Cienfuegos

== Mexico ==
No.	Name	Date of birth	Club
2	Lizeth López	14 May 1990	Baja California
3	Claudia López	21 May 1994	Jalisco
4	Gema Leon	11 March 1991	Nuevo León
5	Andrea Rangel	19 May 1993	Nuevo León
6	Andrea Aguilera	24 September 1993	Nuevo León
7	Alejandra Paerales	11 August 1992	Nuevo León
8	Alejandra Isiordia	17 April 1994	Baja California
10	Lizbeth Sainz	14 December 1995	Baja California
11	Dulce Carranza	29 June 1990	Nuevo León
14	Claudia Rios	22 September 1992	Tamaulipas
17	Zaira Orellana	3 May 1989	Jalisco

== Puerto Rico ==
No.	Name	Date of birth	Club
1	Debora Seilhamer	4 October 1985	Lancheras Cataño
6	Yarimar Rosa	20 June 1988	Indias de Mayagüez
7	Stephanie Enright	15 December 1990	Toray Arrows
8	Ania Ruiz	7 November 1982	Vaqueras Bayamón
9	Áurea Cruz	10 January 1982	Rabitə Baku
11	Karina Ocasio	1 August 1985	Criollas de Caguas
14	Natalia Valentín	12 September 1989	Leonas de Ponce
15	Genesis Miranda	5 June 1996	Porto Rico
17	Sheila Ocasio	7 November 1982	Valencianas Juncos
18	Lynda Morales	20 May 1988	Mets de Guaynabo
22	Laurie González	8 May 1989	Valencianas Juncos
23	Wilmarie Rivera	14 February 1997	Porto Rico

== Dominican Republic ==
No.	Name	Date of birth	Club
1	Annerys Vargas	7 August 1981	Rep. Dominicana
4	Marianne Fersola	16 January 1992	CVU César Vallejo
5	Brenda Castillo	5 June 1992	Rabitə Baku
7	Niverka Marte	11 October 1995	İqtisadçı Baku
8	Cándida Arias	11 March 1992	CDU San Martín
12	Karla Echenique	16 May 1986	Lancheras Cataño
14	Prisilla Rivera	29 December 1984	Pinkin de Corozal
16	Yonkaira Peña	10 May 1993	CDU San Martín
17	Gina Mambrú	21 January 1986	Los Cachorros
18	Bethania de la Cruz	13 May 1987	GS Caltex Seoul
19	Ana Binet	9 February 1992	Samaná
20	Brayelin Martínez	11 September 1996	Mirador SCC

== Saint Lucia ==
No.	Name	Date of birth	Club
1	Natalie Edward	28 January 1984	Le Club Volleyball
2	Sancha Isidore	24 October 1989	Le Club Volleyball
4	Latoya Edward	24 May 1984	Le Club Volleyball
5	Indira Laurencin	22 May 1985	Le Club Volleyball
6	Lisa Casimie	24 July 1996	Jetsetters Volleyball
7	Dania Hamilton	30 October 1986	DSP Volleyball
9	Dala Noel	20 January 1996	Jetsetters Volleyball
10	Gifta Dujon	26 August 1975	Le Club Volleyball
11	Samantha Mann	15 November 1980	Le Club Volleyball
12	Cindy Wilson	12 May 1987	Jetsetters Volleyball

== United States ==
No.	Name	Date of birth	Club
1	Alisha Glass	5 April 1988	Indias de Mayagüez
7	Cassidy Lichtman	25 January 1989	VB Franches-Mont.
8	Lauren Gibbemeyer	8 September 1988	Robursport Pesaro
9	Kristin Richards	30 June 1985	Yeşilyurt SK
10	Jordan Larson	16 October 1986	Dinamo-Kazan
12	Kayla Banwarth	21 January 1989	Dresdner SC
13	Christa Harmotto	12 October 1986	Universal Modena
14	Nicole Fawcett	16 December 1986	Korea Expressway
15	Kelly Murphy	20 October 1989	Vaqueras Bayamón
17	Lauren Paolini	22 August 1987	İqtisadçı Baku
20	Jenna Hagglund	28 May 1989	UGS Élite Nantes
24	Kimberly Hill	30 November 1989	Pepperdine Univ.

== Trinidad and Tobago ==
No.	Name	Date of birth	Club
1	Andrea Kinsale	24 December 1989	Technocrats
2	Zahra Collins	31 August 1996	Glamorgan
3	Channon Thompson	29 March 1994	AZS Białystok
4	Kelly-Anne Billingy	15 May 1986	UGS Élite Nantes
6	Senead Jack	8 November 1993	AZS Białystok
8	Darlene Ramdin	5 August 1989	Glamorgan
10	Courtnee Clifford	6 July 1990	UTT
11	York Makila	7 January 1995	Glamorgan
12	Renele Forde	6 August 1990	Technocrats
16	Krystle Esdelle	1 August 1984	AZS Białystok
17	Abigail Gloud	15 July 1987	UTT
18	Rechez Lindsay	19 January 1994	Holy Name
