= 2013 Women's Pan-American Volleyball Cup squads =

This article shows all participating team squads at the 2013 Women's Pan-American Volleyball Cup, played by twelve countries over June, 2013 in Lima, Callao, Iquitos, Huacho, in Peru.

== Argentina ==
No.	Name	Date of birth	2013 club
1	Lucía Gaido	19 January 1988	(Romania) CS Știința Bacău
2	Josefina Fernández	17 August 1991	(Romania) CSV Alba-Blaj
3	Yamila Nizetich	27 January 1989	(France) Stella ES Calais
5	Lucía Fresco	14 May 1991	(Germany) SC Potsdam
7	Natalia Aispurúa	20 December 1991	(Argentina) Boca Juniors
8	Tanya Acosta	11 March 1991	(Argentina) Gimnasia La Plata
10	Emilce Sosa	11 September 1987	(Romania) CS Știința Bacău
12	Tatiana Rizzo	30 December 1986	(Argentina) Boca Juniors
13	Leticia Boscacci	30 July 1991	(Italy) Volley Soverato
16	Florencia Busquets	27 June 1989	(Peru) Sporting Cristal
17	Antonella Curatola	23 October 1991	(Germany) Raben Vilsbiburg
18	Yael Castiglione	27 September 1985	(Austria) Schwechat Post

== Brazil ==
No.	Name	Date of birth	2013 club
1	Naiane Rios	29 November 1994	(Brazil) EC Pinheiros
3	Maira Claro	7 March 1995	(Brazil) EC Pinheiros
5	Saraelen Lima	16 April 1994	(Brazil) EC Pinheiros
8	Gabriela Guimarães	19 May 1994	(Brazil) Rio de Janeiro VC
9	Rosamaria Montibeller	9 April 1994	(Brazil) Campinas VC
10	Giovana Gasparini	5 July 1994	(Brazil) Minas Tênis Clube
11	Valquíria Dullius	19 August 1994	(Brazil) ADCB Osasco
12	Paula Mohr	23 April 1994	(Brazil) Minas Tênis Clube
13	Milka Silva	18 July 1994	(Brazil) São Caetano EC
16	Domingas de Araújo	9 September 1994	(Brazil) São Caetano EC
17	Sara da Silva	29 April 1994	(Brazil) Minas Tênis Clube
18	Daniela Guimarães	29 July 1994	(Brazil) Osasco VC

== Canada ==
No.	Name	Date of birth	2013 club
1	Janie Guimont	11 April 1984	(Germany) Köpenicker Berlino
3	Brittney Page	4 February 1984	(Belgium) Barbãr Bruxelles
6	Jennifer Lundquist	10 September 1991	(United States) Montana State Univ.
7	Marie-Pier Murray-Methot	23 March 1986	(Italy) Verona Volley
8	Jaimie Thibeault	23 September 1989	(France) ES Le Cannet
9	Tabitha Love	11 September 1991	(Puerto Rico) Criollas de Caguas
10	Marisa Field	10 July 1987	(France) Istres Volley-Ball
14	Kyla Richey	20 June 1989	(Germany) SC Potsdam
18	Shanice Marcelle	28 May 1990	(Canada) Un. British Columbia
19	Danielle Smith	29 April 1990	(Canada) Vancouver Island Un.
20	Lisa Barclay	7 June 1992	(Canada) Un. British Columbia
25	Lucille Charuk	13 August 1989	(Croatia) ŽOK Spalato

== Colombia ==
No.	Name	Date of birth	2013 club
2	Paola Ampudia	5 August 1988	(Poland) Budowlani Łódź
4	Maria Martinez	19 May 1995	(Colombia) Valle del Cauca
5	Lorena Zuleta	16 January 1981	(Poland) Jakarta Popsivo
7	Eileen Acuña	4 September 1994	(Colombia) Risaralda
9	Andrea Estrada	22 June 1995	(Colombia) Bogotá
10	Diana Arrechea	14 September 1994	(Colombia) Valle del Cauca
11	Danna Escobar	25 January 1994	(Colombia) Valle del Cauca
12	Daniela Montaño	12 November 1995	(Colombia) Valle del Cauca
13	Camila Gomez	6 July 1995	(Colombia) Valle del Cauca
15	Maria Marin	4 November 1995	(Colombia) Bolívar
16	Melissa Rangel	16 October 1994	(Colombia) Bolívar
18	Catalina Charry	31 December 1989	(Colombia) Valle del Cauca

== Costa Rica ==
No.	Name	Date of birth	2013 club
2	Eugenia Ramírez	16 April 1990	(Costa Rica) San José
3	Viviana Murillo	6 February 1992	(Costa Rica) Santa Bárbara
5	Karen Cope	6 November 1985	(Costa Rica) San José
6	Ángela Willis	26 January 1977	(Costa Rica) Goicoechea
8	Susana Chavez	24 November 1986	(Costa Rica) San José
9	Verania Willis	23 September 1979	(Costa Rica) Goicoechea
10	Paola Ramírez	23 February 1987	(Costa Rica) UNED
11	Daniela Vargas	4 May 1996	(Costa Rica) Santa Bárbara
14	Irene Fonseca	10 October 1985	(Costa Rica) UNED
15	Marcela Araya	24 September 1992	(Costa Rica) San José
16	Mijal Hines	15 December 1993	(Costa Rica) Goicoechea
18	Evelyn Sibaja	5 February 1993	(Costa Rica) Santa Bárbara

== Cuba ==
No.	Name	Date of birth	2013 club
1	Melissa Vargas	16 October 1999	(Cuba) Cienfuegos
2	Lilianne Marcillan	5 October 1991	(Cuba) Cienfuegos
3	Alena Rojas	9 August 1992	(Cuba) Ciudad Habana
4	Yoana Palacio	6 October 1990	(Cuba) Ciudad Habana
6	Daimara Lescay	5 September 1992	(Cuba) Guantánamo
8	Emily Borrel	19 February 1992	(Cuba) Villa Clara
10	Ana Cleger	27 November 1989	Santiago de Cuba
12	Dailiris Cruz	12 September 1992	(Cuba) Villa Clara
13	Rosanna Giel	10 June 1992	(Cuba) Ciego de Ávila
18	Sulian Matienzo	14 December 1994	(Cuba) Ciudad Habana
19	Jennifer Álvarez	19 November 1993	(Cuba) Cienfuegos
20	Heydi Rodríguez	24 June 1993	(Cuba) Villa Clara

== Dominican Republic ==
No.	Name	Date of birth	2013 club
1	Annerys Vargas	7 August 1981	(Dominican Republic) Rep. Dominicana
4	Marianne Fersola	16 January 1992	(Peru) CVU César Vallejo
7	Niverka Marte	11 October 1995	(Azerbaijan) İqtisadçı Baku
8	Cándida Arias	11 March 1992	(Peru) CDU San Martín
9	Sidarka Núñez	25 June 1984	(Peru) CVU César Vallejo
11	Jeoselyna Rodríguez	9 December 1991	(Romania) Tomis Costanza
12	Karla Echenique	16 May 1986	(Puerto Rico) Lancheras Cataño
14	Prisilla Rivera	29 December 1984	(Puerto Rico) Pinkin de Corozal
17	Yonkaira Peña	10 May 1993	(Peru) CDU San Martín
18	Bethania de la Cruz	13 May 1987	(South Korea) GS Caltex Seoul
17	Ana Binet	9 February 1992	(Dominican Republic) Samaná
18	Brayelin Martínez	11 September 1996	(Dominican Republic) Mirador SCC

== Mexico ==
No.	Name	Date of birth	2013 club
2	Lizbeth Sainz	14 December 1995	(Mexico) Baja California
4	Ivonne Martinez	2 March 1997	(Mexico) Baja California
6	Samantha Bricio	22 November 1994	(United States) Southern California
7	Kaomi Solis	6 August 1994	(Mexico) Colima
8	Alejandra Isiordia	17 April 1994	(Mexico) Baja California
9	Joselyn Urias	16 February 1996	(Mexico) Baja California
10	Gabriela Zazueta	5 September 1994	(Mexico) Baja California
11	Fernanda Guitron	7 March 1996	(Mexico) Jalisco
12	Maria Caledon	9 August 1994	(Mexico) Baja California
15	Patricia Valle	31 May 1996	(Mexico) Sinaloa
16	Valeria Gonzalez	27 March 1994	(Mexico) Nuevo León
17	Sashiko Sanay	13 May 1995	(Mexico) Baja California

== Peru ==
No.	Name	Date of birth	2013 club
1	Angélica Aquino	10 August 1990	(Peru) CDU San Martín
2	Mirtha Uribe	12 March 1985	(Peru) Alianza Lima
3	Grecia Herrada	13 March 1993	(Peru) Deportivo Géminis
4	Patricia Soto	10 February 1980	(Peru) CDU San Martín
5	Janice Torres	9 November 1991	(Peru) CDU San Martín
6	Alexandra Muñoz	16 August 1992	(Peru) CVU César Vallejo
7	Yulissa Zamudio	24 March 1976	(Peru) CDU San Martín
9	Raffaella Camet	14 September 1992	(Peru) Sporting Cristal
10	Zoila La Rosa	31 May 1990	(Peru) CDU San Martín
11	Clarivett Yllescas	11 August 1993	(Peru) CVU César Vallejo
15	Karla Ortiz	20 October 1991	(Chile) Boston College
16	Maria Acosta	25 May 1992	(Peru) Deportivo Géminis

== Puerto Rico ==
No.	Name	Date of birth	2013 club
1	Daly Santana	19 February 1995	(United States) Univ. of Minnesota
2	Shara Venegas	18 September 1992	(Puerto Rico) Criollas de Caguas
4	Pilar Victoriá	11 October 1995	(Puerto Rico) Porto Rico
6	Yarimar Rosa	20 June 1988	(Puerto Rico) Indias de Mayagüez
10	Génesis Collazo	4 October 1992	(Puerto Rico) Criollas de Caguas
11	Karina Ocasio	1 August 1985	(Puerto Rico) Criollas de Caguas
12	Michelle Nogueras	5 December 1988	(Puerto Rico) Criollas de Caguas
14	Natalia Valentín	12 September 1989	(Puerto Rico) Leonas de Ponce
17	Sheila Ocasio	17 November 1982	(Puerto Rico) Valencianas Juncos
18	Lynda Morales	20 May 1988	(Puerto Rico) Mets de Guaynabo
17	Diana Reyes	3 February 1993	(Puerto Rico) Criollas de Caguas
18	Ania Ruiz	7 November 1982	(Puerto Rico) Vaqueras Bayamón

== United States ==
No.	Name	Date of birth	2013 club
1	Alisha Glass	5 April 1988	(Puerto Rico) Indias de Mayagüez
7	Cassidy Lichtman	25 January 1989	(Switzerland) VB Franches-Mont.
8	Lauren Gibbemeyer	8 September 1988	(Italy) Robursport Pesaro
11	Megan Hodge	15 October 1988	(Azerbaijan) Azərreyl Baku
12	Kayla Banwarth	21 January 1989	(Germany) Dresdner SC
14	Nicole Fawcett	16 December 1986	(South Korea) Korea Expressway
16	Kimberly Hill	30 November 1989	(United States) Pepperdine Univ.
17	Lauren Paolini	22 August 1987	(Azerbaijan) İqtisadçı Baku
20	Jenna Hagglund	28 May 1989	(France) UGS Élite Nantes
22	Rachael Adams	3 June 1990	(Poland) Pałac Bydgoszcz
24	Kristin Richards	30 June 1985	(Turkey) Yeşilyurt SK
25	Kelly Murphy	20 October 1989	(Puerto Rico) Vaqueras Bayamón

== Trinidad and Tobago ==
No.	Name	Date of birth	2013 club
1	Andrea Kinsale	24 December 1989	(Trinidad and Tobago) Technocrats
3	Channon Thompson	29 March 1984	(Poland) AZS Białystok
4	Kelly-Anne Billingy	15 May 1986	(France) UGS Élite Nantes
5	Samantha Prescott	26 January 1994	(Trinidad and Tobago) Technocrats
6	Sinead Jack	8 November 1993	(Trinidad and Tobago) AZS Białystok
8	Darlene Radmin	5 August 1989	(Trinidad and Tobago) Glamorgan
10	Courtnee Clifford	6 July 1990	(Trinidad and Tobago) UTT
12	Renele Forde	6 August 1990	(Trinidad and Tobago) Technocrats
15	Abby Blackman	15 June 1984	(Trinidad and Tobago) UTT
16	Krystle Esdelle	1 August 1984	(Poland) AZS Białystok
17	Abigail Gloud	15 July 1987	(Trinidad and Tobago) UTT
18	Rechez Lindsay	19 January 1994	(Trinidad and Tobago) Holy Name
