= 2015 Women's NORCECA Volleyball Championship squads =

This article shows all participating team squads at the 2015 Women's NORCECA Volleyball Championship, held from 27 September 27 to 2 October, 2015 in Michoacan, Mexico.

== Canada ==
No.	Name	Date of birth	Club
1	Janie Guimond	11 April 1984	Canada
3	Brittney Page	4 February 1984	Sichuan Volleyball
4	Kyla Richey	20 June 1989	Raben Vilsbiburg
5	Danielle Smith	29 April 1990	Raben Vilsbiburg
8	Jaimie Thibeault	23 September 1989	Legion. Legionowo
9	Tabitha Love	11 September 1991	Azəryol Baku
10	Marisa Field	10 July 1987	Neuchâtel UCV
12	Jennifer Cross	4 July 1992	Engelholm VS
13	Lucille Charuk	13 August 1989	TVF Amburgo
15	Rebecca Pavan	17 April 1990	Béziers Volley
17	Kristen Moncks	31 July 1992	Trinity Western Un.
18	Shanice Marcelle	25 May 1990	Dresdner SC
20	Dana Cranston	5 December 1991	TVF Amburgo
22	Megan Cyr	1 June 1990	Neuchâtel UCV

== Costa Rica ==
No.	Name	Date of birth	Club
2	Mónica Picado	10 January 1994	Santa Bárbara
3	Viviana Murillo	6 February 1992	Santa Bárbara
5	Melissa Rodríguez	2 September 1997	San José
12	Tatiana Sayles	1 August 1997	San José
14	Irene Fonseca	10 October 1985	UNED
15	Tania Carazo	11 August 1996	Abangares
16	Mijal Hines	15 December 1993	Goicoechea
17	María Fernanda Alfaro	24 July 1996	Universidad Nacional
18	Evelyn Sibaja	5 February 1993	Santa Bárbara
20	Valeria Campos	20 January 1995	Santa Bárbara
21	Mónica Castro	5 January 1996	San José
23	Daniela Vargas	25 September 1997	Goicoechea

== Cuba ==
The following is the Cuban roster in the 2015 NORCECA Championship.

Head coach: Roberto García

No.	Name	Date of birth	Height	Weight	Spike	Block	2015 club
2	Regla Gracia	28 May 1993	1.77 m (5 ft 10 in)	67 kg (148 lb)	301 cm (119 in)	282 cm (111 in)	(Cuba) Camagüey
3	Alena Rojas	9 August 1992	1.86 m (6 ft 1 in)	76 kg (168 lb)	320 cm (130 in)	305 cm (120 in)	(Cuba) La Habana
5	Yamila Hernández	8 November 1992	1.82 m (6 ft 0 in)	69 kg (152 lb)	301 cm (119 in)	285 cm (112 in)	(Cuba) La Habana
6	Daymara Lescay	5 September 1992	1.84 m (6 ft 0 in)	72 kg (159 lb)	308 cm (121 in)	290 cm (110 in)	(Cuba) Guantanamo
10	Emily Borrell	19 February 1992	1.67 m (5 ft 6 in)	55 kg (121 lb)	270 cm (110 in)	260 cm (100 in)	(Cuba) Villa Clara
11	Gretell Moreno	30 January 1998	1.83 m (6 ft 0 in)	68 kg (150 lb)	287 cm (113 in)	280 cm (110 in)	(Cuba) Granma
14	Dayami Sánchez	14 March 1994	1.78 m (5 ft 10 in)	64 kg (141 lb)	314 cm (124 in)	302 cm (119 in)	(Cuba) Ciudad Habana
16	Yelennis Díaz	14 October 1995	1.89 m (6 ft 2 in)	71 kg (157 lb)	300 cm (120 in)	298 cm (117 in)	(Cuba) Villa Clara
17	Heidy Casanova	6 November 1998	1.84 m (6 ft 0 in)	78 kg (172 lb)	244 cm (96 in)	240 cm (94 in)	(Cuba) La Habana
18	Sulian Matienzo (C)	14 December 1994	1.78 m (5 ft 10 in)	75 kg (165 lb)	232 cm (91 in)	230 cm (91 in)	(Cuba) La Habana
19	Jennifer Álvarez	19 November 1993	1.84 m (6 ft 0 in)	72 kg (159 lb)	310 cm (120 in)	294 cm (116 in)	(Cuba) Cienfuegos
20	Heidy Rodríguez	24 June 1993	1.87 m (6 ft 2 in)	66 kg (146 lb)	312 cm (123 in)	308 cm (121 in)	(Cuba) Villa Clara

== Mexico ==
No.	Name	Date of birth	Club
1	Gema Leon	11 March 1991	Nuevo León
2	Lizeth López	14 May 1990	Baja California
3	Claudia López	21 May 1994	Jalisco
4	Kathya García	6 March 1998	Chihuahua
5	Andrea Rangel	19 May 1993	Nuevo León
6	Freda López	17 June 1988	Oaxaca
7	Karina Flores	16 August 1998	Nuevo León
8	Dulce Carranza	29 June 1990	Nuevo León
9	Alejandra Maldonado	9 November 1993	Nuevo León
10	Lizbeth Sainz	14 December 1995	Baja California
13	Mónica Moreno	27 April 1995	Nuevo León
18	Jazmin Hernández	18 September 1989	Nuevo León
19	María Fernanda Rodríguez	23 June 1997	Nuevo León
20	Alondra Amaro	9 June 1998	Durango

== Puerto Rico ==
No.	Name	Date of birth	Club
1	Debora Seilhamer	4 October 1985	Lancheras de Cataño
3	Vilmarie Mojica	13 August 1985	Valencianas de Juncos
6	Yarimar Rosa	20 June 1988	Valencianas de Juncos
7	Stephanie Enright	15 December 1990	Criollas de Caguas
9	Áurea Cruz	10 January 1982	Rabita Baku
11	Karina Ocasio	1 August 1985	Criollas de Caguas
13	Shirley Ferrer	23 June 1991	Lancheras de Cataño
14	Natalia Valentín	12 September 1989	Leonas de Ponce
16	Alexandra Oquendo	3 February 1984	Criollas de Caguas
18	Lynda Morales	20 May 1998	Criollas de Caguas
21	Diana Reyes	3 February 1993	Criollas de Caguas
23	Keila Rodríguez	26 October 1992	Indias de Mayagüez

== Dominican Republic ==
No.	Name	Date of birth	Club
1	Annerys Vargas	7 August 1981	River Piacenza
2	Winifer Fernández	6 January 1995	Telekom Baku
3	Lisvel Eve	10 September 1991	Mirador
4	Marianne Fersola	19 January 1992	Mirador
5	Brenda Castillo	5 January 1992	Rabita Baku
6	Camil Domínguez	7 December 1991	Mirador
7	Niverka Marte	19 October 1990	Mirador
13	Erasma Moreno	25 November 1991	Mirador
14	Gaila González	25 June 1997	Mirador
16	Yonkaira Peña	10 May 1993	Bursa BBSK
17	Gina Mambrú	21 January 1986	Beşiktaş JK
19	Ana Binet	9 February 1992	Mirador
20	Brayelin Martínez	11 September 1996	Mirador
21	Jineiry Martínez	3 December 1997	Mirador

== United States ==
No.	Name	Date of birth	Club
1	Alisha Glass	5 April 1988	Imoco Conegliano
2	Kayla Banwarth	21 January 1989	Stati Uniti
8	Lauren Gibbemeyer	8 September 1988	VB Casalmaggiore
10	Jordan Larson	16 October 1986	Eczacıbaşı Istanbul
11	Megan Hodge	15 October 1988	
14	Nicole Fawcett	16 December 1986	Korea Expressway
16	Foluke Akinradewo	5 October 1987	Rabita Baku
17	Natalie Hagglund	1 July 1992	Voléro Zürich
18	Molly Kreklow	17 February 1992	Dresdner SC
21	TeTori Dixon	4 August 1992	Rabita Baku
22	Rachael Adams	3 June 1990	Imoco Conegliano
23	Kelsey Robinson	25 June 1992	Leonas de Ponce
24	Krista Vansant	31 March 1993	Univ. of Washington
25	Karsta Lowe	2 February 1993	Changas Naranjito

== Trinidad and Tobago ==
No.	Name	Date of birth	Club
1	Hannah Floyd	26 April 1997	UTT
3	Channon Thompson	29 March 1994	Uralochka-NTMK
5	Shontelle Yearwood	19 December 1992	UTT
6	Sinead Jack	8 November 1993	Uralochka-NTMK
7	Asia Joseph	27 July 1993	UTT
8	Darlene Ramdin	5 August 1989	Glamorgan
9	Kerdisha Sutherland	8 July 1995	UTT
11	Afesha Olton	22 May 1992	UTT
12	Renele Forde	6 August 1990	Technocrats
14	Rejeanne Wallace	14 May 1996	UTT
16	Krystle Esdelle	1 August 1984	CSM Bucarest
17	Shernice De Four	16 July 1994	UTT
