= 2011 Liga de Voleibol Superior Femenino =

The 2011 Liga de Voleibol Superior Femenino is the 43rd official season of Liga de Voleibol Superior Femenino (English: Female Superior Volleyball League). The 2011 season was dedicated to Ángel Rivero. In early May, the President of the Puerto Rican Volleyball Federation announced that the Champion from the 2011 LVSF tournament will be the NORCECA representative at the 2011 FIVB Women's Club World Championship.

== Competing Teams ==
Team	City	Venue	Head coach
Criollas de Caguas	Caguas	Coliseo Héctor Solá Bezares	(Argentina) Carlos Cardona
Gigantes de Carolina	Carolina	Guillermo Angulo Coliseum	(Puerto Rico) Arcángel Ruiz
Indias de Mayagüez	Mayagüez	Palacio de Recreación y Deportes	(Argentina) Hugo Gotuzzo
Lancheras de Cataño	Cataño	Cancha Cosme Beitía Sálamo	(Puerto Rico) Milton Crespo
Leonas de Ponce	Ponce	Salvador Dijols Coliseum	(Puerto Rico) Rafael Olazagasti
Llaneras de Toa Baja	Toa Baja	Coliseo Antonio R. Barceló	(Puerto Rico) Juan Carlos Núñez
Mets de Guaynabo	Guaynabo	Coliseo Mario Morales	(Puerto Rico) Javier Gaspar
Pinkin de Corozal	Corozal	Coliseo Emilio E. Huyke	(Puerto Rico) Luis E. Ruiz
Vaqueras de Bayamón	Bayamón	Coliseo Rubén Rodríguez	(Puerto Rico) Yarelis Rodríguez
Valencianas de Juncos	Juncos	Coliseo Rafael G. Amalbert	(Puerto Rico) Xiomara Molero

== Regular season ==
As of the end of the regular season, April 10, 2011.

Pos	Team	G	W	L	Ratio	SW	SL	Ratio	PW	PL	Ratio
1	Criollas de Caguas	22	20	2	0.909	63	17	3.706	1933	1645	1.175
2	Indias de Mayagüez	22	14	8	0.636	54	33	1.636	1973	1835	1.075
3	Mets de Guaynabo	22	14	8	0.636	51	39	1.308	2021	1852	1.091
4	Lancheras de Cataño	22	13	9	0.591	45	40	1.125	1861	1869	0.996
5	Llaneras de Toa Baja	22	11	11	0.500	47	45	1.044	1965	1972	0.996
6	Pinkin de Corozal	22	11	11	0.500	42	43	0.977	1904	1877	1.014
7	Vaqueras de Bayamón	22	8	14	0.364	35	46	0.761	1767	1875	0.942
8	Leonas de Ponce	22	7	15	0.318	28	55	0.519	1663	1821	0.913
9	Valencianas de Juncos	22	6	16	0.273	30	51	0.588	1712	1872	0.915
10	Gigantes de Carolina	22	6	16	0.273	30	57	0.526	1842	2023	0.911

=== Statistics ===
==== Scorers ====
Pos.	Player	Team	Attacks	Blocks	Aces	Total
1	(Dominican Republic) Bethania de la Cruz	Caguas	311	24	57	392
2	(United States) Callie Rivers	Ponce	318	35	17	370
3	(United States) Erin Moore	Bayamón	320	30	14	364
4	(United States) Katie Dull	Toa Baja	290	60	13	363
5	(Canada) Stacey Gordon	Caguas	327	23	6	356
6	(United States) Tiffany Owens	Juncos	326	17	12	355
7	(Puerto Rico) Vanessa Velez	Corozal	322	22	11	355
8	(Puerto Rico) Tatiana Encarnación	Carolina	310	22	10	342
9	(Brazil) Juliana Paz	Guaynabo	275	39	24	338
10	(United States) Sherisa Livingston	Carolina	312	20	5	337
11	(Dominican Republic) Dahiana Burgos	Mayagüez	282	20	23	325
12	(United States) Stephanie Niemer	Mayagüez	259	25	37	321
13	(United States) Shonda Cole	Corozal	276	34	9	319
14	(Venezuela) Oneida González	Cataño	265	37	6	308
15	(Dominican Republic) Sidarka Núñez	Mayagüez	261	21	24	306

==== Spikers ====
Pos.	Player	Team	Attacks
1	(Canada) Stacey Gordon	Caguas	327
2	(United States) Tiffany Owens	Juncos	326
3	(Puerto Rico) Vanessa Velez	Corozal	322
4	(United States) Erin Moore	Bayamón	320
5	(United States) Callie Rivers	Ponce	318

==== Blockers ====
Pos.	Player	Team	Blocks
1	(United States) Brittnee Cooper	Toa Baja	83
2	(Cuba) Yasary Castrodad	Toa Baja	82
3	(United States) Jennifer Doris	Carolina	74
4	(Cuba) Dulce Téllez	Guaynabo	72
5	(United States) Lindsay Fletemier	Ponce	66

==== Servers ====
Pos.	Player	Team	Aces
1	(Dominican Republic) Bethania de la Cruz	Caguas	57
3	(Puerto Rico) Stephanie Enright	Caguas	38
3	(United States) Stephanie Niemer	Mayagüez	37
4	(Puerto Rico) Ania Ruiz	Cataño	32
5	(Puerto Rico) Daly Santana	Toa Baja	28

==== Receivers ====
Pos.	Player	Team	Receptions
1	(Puerto Rico) Shara Venegas	Toa Baja	394
2	(Puerto Rico) Deborah Seilhamer	Mayagüez	352
3	(Puerto Rico) Bianca Rivera	Mayagüez	295
4	(Puerto Rico) Tatiana Encarnación	Carolina	291
5	(Canada) Stacey Gordon	Caguas	285

==== Setters ====
Pos.	Player	Team	Running Sets
1	(Puerto Rico) Mariana Thon	Bayamon	375
2	(United States) Jessica Nyrop	Mayagüez	307
3	(Puerto Rico) Glorimar Ortega	Caguas	287
4	(United States) Rachel Hartmann	Cataño	258
5	(United States) Lindsey Hunter	Caguas	245

==== Diggers ====
Pos.	Player	Team	Digs
1	(Dominican Republic) Brenda Castillo	Caguas	486
2	(Puerto Rico) Deborah Seilhamer	Mayagüez	481
3	(Puerto Rico) Pamela Cartagena	Corozal	451
4	(Puerto Rico) Xaimara Colón	Carolina	441
5	(Puerto Rico) Bianca Rivera	Bayamón	436

==== Liberos ====
Pos.	Player	Team	Avg
1	(Dominican Republic) Brenda Castillo	Caguas	10.46
2	(Puerto Rico) Deborah Seilhamer	Mayagüez	9.57
3	(Puerto Rico) Bianca Rivera	Bayamón	9.02
4	(Puerto Rico) Wilmarys Flores	Ponce	8.70
5	(Puerto Rico) Cindy Bernacet	Cataño	8.69

=== Awards ===
==== Voting Awards ====
- Most valuable player
  - Bethania de la Cruz (DOM) Criollas de Caguas
- Best setter
  - Mariana Thon (PUR) Vaqueras de Bayamón
- More Progress Player
  - Stephanie Enright (PUR) Criollas de Caguas
- Rookie of the Year
  - Mariana Thon (PUR) Vaqueras de Bayamón
- Coach Of the Year
  - (Puerto Rico) Javier Gaspar Mets de Guaynabo
- Chairman Of the Year
  - (Puerto Rico) Francisco Ramos Criollas de Caguas

==== Statistics Awards ====
According to league statistics at the end of the regular season.

- Best scorer
  - Bethania de la Cruz (DOM) Criollas de Caguas
- Best spiker
  - Stacey Gordon (CAN) Criollas de Caguas
- Best blocker
  - Brittnee Cooper (USA) Llaneras de Toa Baja
- Best server
  - Bethania de la Cruz (DOM) Criollas de Caguas
- Best setter
  - Mariana Thon (PUR) Vaqueras de Bayamón
- Best digger
  - Brenda Castillo (DOM) Criollas de Caguas
- Best receiver
  - Shara Venegas (PUR) Llaneras de Toa Baja
- Best libero
  - Brenda Castillo (DOM) Criollas de Caguas

== Quarterfinals ==
As of the end of quarterfinals, April 26, 2011.

=== Group A ===
Pos	Team	G	W	L	Ratio	SW	SL	Ratio	PW	PL	Ratio
1	Criollas de Caguas	6	6	0	1.000	18	1	18.000	464	345	1.345
2	Llaneras de Toa Baja	6	4	2	0.667	12	10	1.200	497	490	1.014
3	Lancheras de Cataño	6	1	5	0.167	8	16	0.500	502	550	0.913
4	Leonas de Ponce	6	1	5	0.167	6	17	0.353	482	560	0.861

=== Group B ===
Pos	Team	G	W	L	Ratio	SW	SL	Ratio	PW	PL	Ratio
1	Mets de Guaynabo	6	5	1	0.833	17	6	2.833	531	450	1.180
2	Indias de Mayagüez	6	4	2	0.667	12	11	1.091	525	503	1.044
3	Pinkin de Corozal	6	3	3	0.500	13	12	1.083	544	544	1.000
4	Vaqueras de Bayamón	6	0	6	0.000	5	18	0.278	454	557	0.815

== Semifinals ==
=== Group A ===
Pos	Team	G	W	L	Ratio	SW	SL	Ratio	PW	PL	Ratio
1	Criollas de Caguas	4	4	0	MAX	12	3	4.000	357	311	1.148
2	Indias de Mayagüez	4	0	4	0.000	3	12	0.250	311	357	0.871

==== Results ====
Game 1. April 29, 2011

	Score		Set 1	Set 2	Set 3	Set 4	Set 5
Indias de Mayagüez	PUR	0–3	Criollas de Caguas	PUR	21-25	22-25	20-25

Game 2. April 30, 2011

	Score		Set 1	Set 2	Set 3	Set 4	Set 5
Criollas de Caguas	PUR	3–0	Indias de Mayagüez	PUR	25-16	27-25	27-25

Game 3. May 2, 2011

	Score		Set 1	Set 2	Set 3	Set 4	Set 5
Indias de Mayagüez	PUR	1–3	Criollas de Caguas	PUR	19-25	17-25	27-25

Game 4. May 4, 2011

	Score		Set 1	Set 2	Set 3	Set 4	Set 5
Criollas de Caguas	PUR	3–2	Indias de Mayagüez	PUR	25-19	17-25	19-25

=== Group B ===
Pos	Team	G	W	L	Ratio	SW	SL	Ratio	PW	PL	Ratio
1	Mets de Guaynabo	4	4	0	MAX	12	5	2.400	397	342	1.161
2	Llaneras de Toa Baja	4	0	4	0.000	5	12	0.417	342	397	0.861

==== Results ====
Game 1. April 28, 2011

	Score		Set 1	Set 2	Set 3	Set 4	Set 5
Llaneras de Toa Baja	PUR	1–3	Mets de Guaynabo	PUR	25-22	20-25	16-25

Game 2. April 30, 2011

	Score		Set 1	Set 2	Set 3	Set 4	Set 5
Mets de Guaynabo	PUR	3–2	Llaneras de Toa Baja	PUR	22-25	23-25	25-19

Game 3. May 2, 2011

	Score		Set 1	Set 2	Set 3	Set 4	Set 5
Llaneras de Toa Baja	PUR	0–3	Mets de Guaynabo	PUR	17-25	22-25	24-26

Game 4. May 3, 2011

	Score		Set 1	Set 2	Set 3	Set 4	Set 5
Mets de Guaynabo	PUR	3–2	Llaneras de Toa Baja	PUR	25-15	24-26	25-23

== Final ==
=== Standing ===
Pos	Team	G	W	L	Ratio	SW	SL	Ratio	PW	PL	Ratio
1	Criollas de Caguas	4	4	0	MAX	12	2	6.000	334	278	1.201
2	Mets de Guaynabo	4	0	4	0.000	2	12	0.167	278	334	0.832

==== Results ====
Game 1. May 8, 2011

	Score		Set 1	Set 2	Set 3	Set 4	Set 5
Mets de Guaynabo	PUR	0–3	Criollas de Caguas	PUR	19-25	14-25	18-25

Game 2. May 10, 2011

	Score		Set 1	Set 2	Set 3	Set 4	Set 5
Criollas de Caguas	PUR	3–2	Mets de Guaynabo	PUR	21-25	25-16	25-18

Game 3. May 12, 2011

	Score		Set 1	Set 2	Set 3	Set 4	Set 5
Criollas de Caguas	PUR	3–0	Mets de Guaynabo	PUR	25-17	28-26	25-20

Game 4. May 14, 2011

	Score		Set 1	Set 2	Set 3	Set 4	Set 5
Mets de Guaynabo	PUR	0–3	Criollas de Caguas	PUR	22-25	22-25	23-25

==== Awards ====
- Final Series Most Valuable Player

Stephanie Enright (PUR) Criollas de Caguas

2011 Liga de Voleibol Superior Femenino
Criollas de Caguas
8th Title
