= Kim Willoughby =

American volleyball player

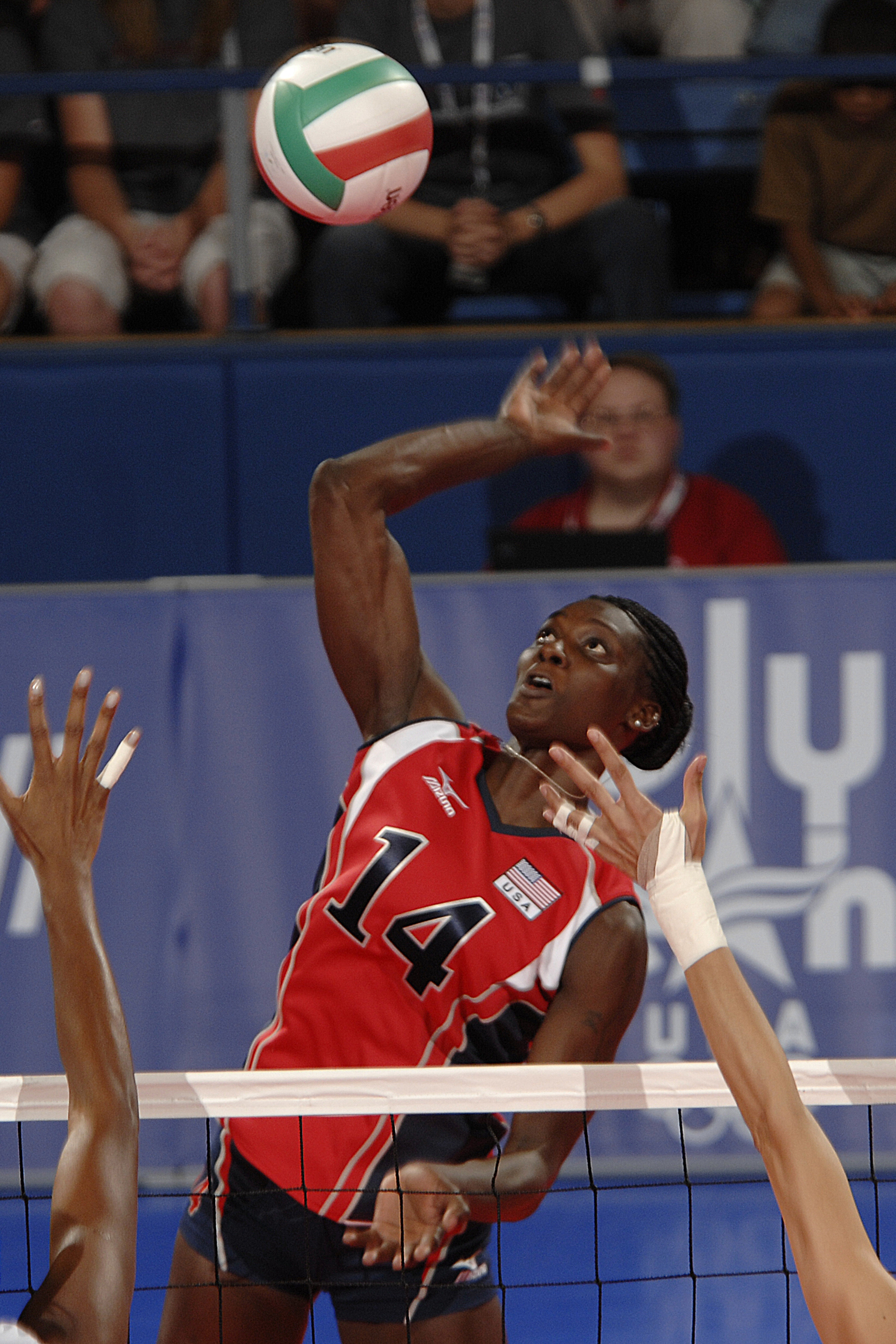

Personal information
- Full name: Kim Marie Willoughby
- Born: November 7, 1980 (age 45); Houma, Louisiana, U.S.
- Height: 5 ft 11 in (1.80 m)
- Spike: 124 in (315 cm)
- Block: 120 in (300 cm)
- Education: University of Hawaii

Volleyball information
- Position: Outside hitter
- Number: 14, 12 (2008)

Career
Years	Teams
1999–2003; 2003–05; 2005–06; 2006–07; 2007–08; 2008–09; 2009; 2011–12; 2012–13; 2013– 2016	University of Hawaii; Criollas de Caguas; CAV Murcia 2005; Santeramo Sport; Chieri Volleyball; Sirio Perugia; Valencianas de Juncos; Valencianas de Juncos; Pinkin de Corozal; Igtisadchi Baku; Mayagüez Indias

National team
2006–2008	United States
Medal record
Women's volleyball
Representing the United States
Olympic Games
Silver medal – second place	2008 Beijing	Team

Kim Marie Willoughby (born November 7, 1980) is an American former indoor volleyball player. She is 5 ft 11 in (1.80 m) and was an outside hitter. In 2007, she played professionally for the Italian Serie A League Familia Chieri. In April 2008, she joined the U.S. national team. Willoughby made her Olympic debut at the 2008 Beijing Olympics, helping the United States to a silver medal.

Playing with Colussi Sirio Perugia, she won the bronze medal at the 2008–09 CEV Indesit Champions League, and she was awarded "Best Receiver".

== Early life and family ==
Willoughby was born in Houma, Louisiana, and grew up in Napoleonville, Louisiana, where she attended Assumption High School. She not only played volleyball, but also lettered in track & field and basketball. She led her high school volleyball team to three consecutive state championships and was named the Louisiana Player of the Year her junior and senior seasons and was a First Team All-American.

Her parents are Vincent Gaines and Lula Willoughby. During Willoughby 's junior year, her mother was in a car accident that led to two strokes and paralysis from the waist down. More tragedy struck after Willoughby 's boyfriend was shot after an argument and died, and she admits that she was angry and fought often when she was young.

== College ==
During college, Willoughby played for the University of Hawaiʻi Rainbow Wahine volleyball team. She was a three-time AVCA First Team All-America honoree and was named the NCAA National Player of the Year in 2003.

As a senior in 2003, she ranked second nationally in kills per game with 6.60 while adding averages of 3.04 digs, 0.62 aces, 0.57 blocks and 0.41 assists per game. She hit .373 in her final collegiate season to help the Rainbow Wahine to the NCAA Division I Women's Volleyball Tournament national semifinals for the second consecutive year. As a junior in 2002, Willoughby charted a 6.31 kill average to finish in the top three nationally. She recorded a .342 hitting percentage and averaged 3.35 digs, 0.70 aces, 0.61 blocks and 0.30 assists per game. She led the nation in kills as a sophomore in 2001, posting a 7.20 kill average. Additionally, she led her team with a 3.66 dig average, breaking the school's single season dig average record at the time.

For her career, she averaged 5.91 kills per game, which ranked third-best in NCAA history at the time. She is the all-time leader in kills at Hawaii with 2,598. The All-Time kill leader in the Western Athletic Conference. Also had career totals of 1,440 digs, 194 aces and 291 blocks over 459 career games. Willoughby was a four-year starter in college, playing the opposite/right-side hitter position as a freshman and emerging as the team's go-to player as an outside hitter in her last three seasons. She was also a four-time All-Western Athletic Conference honoree, garnering second team team honors as a freshman in 2000 and earning first team honors in 2001, 2002 and 2003. She was also awarded the Western Athletic Conference Player of the Year title in 2001, 2002, 2003.

== Legal troubles ==
On June 8, 2001, Willoughby was charged with abuse of a family or household member and third-degree assault. The victim in the case was granted a three-year protective order against Willoughby. A court accepted a deferred guilty plea from Willoughby, which allowed the charges to be cleared from her criminal record if she met certain conditions.

On May 18, 2009, Kim Willoughby pleaded no contest to first-degree assault and was sentenced to five years probation for attacking a woman outside Pipeline Cafe in Kakaako, Hawaii leaving the victim with serious facial injuries. The incident occurred in December 2006, and prosecutors challenged Willoughby's claim of self-defense, noting she had allegedly followed the victim out of the club before the assault. Willoughby had been charged in September 2008 and released on $50,000 bail.

=== Positive drug test ===
Willoughby tested positive for nandrolone after a match for her Italian team Perugia in April 2009. On September 11, 2009, it was announced that Willoughby was given a two-year suspension from the Italian Olympic Committee, to end on July 10, 2011.

=== Acquittal in Puerto Rico trial ===
In December 2021, Willoughby was found not guilty for the death of her three-year-old adoptive daughter, related to an incident that occurred in Mayagüez, Puerto Rico, in 2016. Willoughby had been charged with first-degree murder and child abuse after forensic reports suggested the child died from severe trauma. Her defense argued that the injuries were caused by improperly administered CPR. After a lengthy trial, the court ruled in her favor, citing insufficient evidence to prove guilt beyond a reasonable doubt.

== Awards ==
=== Individual ===
- 2008–09 CEV Indesit Champions League Final Four "Best Receiver"

=== College ===
- 3-Time NCAA 1st Team All-American 2001, 2002, 2003
- 2003 NCAA National Player of the Year
- 3-Time NCAA 1st Team All-Region 2001, 2002, 2003
- 3-Time WAC 1st Team All-Conference 2001, 2002, 2003
- 3-Time WAC Player of the Year 2001, 2002, 2003
- 2000 WAC Co-Freshman of the Year
