= Criollas de Caguas squads =

This article shows past squads from the Puerto Rican women's professional volleyball team Criollas de Caguas from the Liga de Voleibol Superior Femenino.

== 2009 ==
- Position:

As of February 2009

- Head coach: (Brazil) Claudio López Pinheiro
- Assistant coach: (Puerto Rico) Rubén Cruz

Number	Player	Position
1	(Dominican Republic) Annerys Vargas	Middle Blocker
2	(Puerto Rico) Neisaliz Marrero	Wing Spiker
3	(Puerto Rico) Karla Rivera	Libero
4	(Dominican Republic) Lisvel Elisa Eve	Middle Blocker
5	(Puerto Rico) Vanessa Vélez	Setter
6	(Puerto Rico) Stephanie Enright	Wing Spiker
7	(Puerto Rico) Shirley Ferrer	Wing Spiker
9	(Puerto Rico) Yarleen Santiago	Wing Spiker
11	(Puerto Rico) Glorivee Vázquez	Wing Spiker
12	(Puerto Rico) Odemaris Díaz	Wing Spiker
14	(Puerto Rico) Darangelis Yantín	Opposite
15	(United States) Shonda Cole	Opposite

=== Release or Transfer ===
Number	Player	Position
2	(Puerto Rico) Neisaliz Marrero	
7	(United States) Maggie Griffin	Setter
8	(Puerto Rico) Jamie Lugo	Middle Blocker
10	(Puerto Rico) Talia González	Setter
15	(Dominican Republic) Cosiri Rodríguez	Opposite

- Head coach: (Puerto Rico) Luis García
