= Liga de Voleibol Superior Femenino =

Women's professional volleyball league in Puerto Rico

Liga de Voleibol Superior Femenino (LVSF)
- Current season, competition or edition: 2026 Liga de Voleibol Superior Femenino
- Sport: Volleyball
- Founded: 1968
- CEO: José Servera
- No. of teams: 6
- Country: Puerto Rico
- Continent: North America
- Most recent champion: Cangrejeras de Santurce
- Most titles: Pinkin de Corozal (19 titles)
- Level on pyramid: 1
- Website: fedpurvoli.com

The Liga de Voleibol Superior Femenino (LVSF) is a women's professional volleyball league in Puerto Rico. The competitions are organized by the Puerto Rican Volleyball Federation (Federación Puertorriqueña de Voleibol, FPV).

== Teams ==
=== Current teams ===
Current location of the teams competing in the 2026 season

Team		Home city	Notes
CAG	Criollas de Caguas	Caguas	
COR	Pinkin de Corozal	Corozal	
JUN	Valencianas de Juncos	Juncos	
MAN	Atenienses de Manatí	Manatí	
PON	Leonas de Ponce	Ponce	Current runner-up
SCE	Cangrejeras de Santurce	San Juan	Current champion

=== Inactive teams ===
Team	Home city	Notes
Mets de Guaynabo	Guaynabo	Formerly known as Conquistadoras de Guaynabo

=== Former teams ===
Team	Home city	Notes
Amazonas de Trujillo Alto	Trujillo Alto	
Capitanas de Arecibo	Arecibo	Formerly known as Radiólogas de Arecibo
Caribes de San Sebastián	San Sebastián	
Changas de Naranjito	Naranjito	
Aguadilla Divas	Aguadilla	
Dolls de Río Piedras	San Juan	
Ganaderas de Hatillo	Hatillo	
Gigantes de Carolina	Carolina	
Grises de Humacao	Humacao	Formerly known as Orientales de Humacao
Indias de Mayagüez	Mayagüez	
Ingenieras de Hato Rey	San Juan	
Lancheras de Cataño	Cataño	
Llaneras de Toa Baja	Toa Baja	
Playeras de Isabela	Isabela	
Polluelas de Aibonito	Aibonito	
Rebeldes de Moca	Moca	
Sanjuaneras de la Capital	San Juan	Formerly known as Capitalinas de San Juan and Chicas de San Juan
Vaqueras de Bayamón	Bayamón	
Volleygirls de Guayanilla	Guayanilla	

== League champions ==
Year	Champion	Runner-up	MVP
1968	Pinkin de Corozal	–	
1969	Pinkin de Corozal	Dolls de Río Piedras	
1970	Pinkin de Corozal	Atenienses de Manatí	
1971	Pinkin de Corozal	Dolls de Río Piedras	
1972	Pinkin de Corozal	Dolls de Río Piedras	
1973	Pinkin de Corozal	Volleygirls de Guayanilla	
1974	Pinkin de Corozal	Volleygirls de Guayanilla	
1975	Pinkin de Corozal	Volleygirls de Guayanilla	
1976	Volleygirls de Guayanilla	Pinkin de Corozal	
1977	Pinkin de Corozal	Volleygirls de Guayanilla	
1978	Mets de Guaynabo	Pinkin de Corozal	
1979	Pinkin de Corozal	Mets de Guaynabo	
1980	Pinkin de Corozal	Chicas de San Juan	
1981	Pinkin de Corozal	Chicas de San Juan	
1982	Pinkin de Corozal	Ingenieras de Hato Rey	
1983	Pinkin de Corozal	Chicas de San Juan	
1984	Pinkin de Corozal	Chicas de San Juan	
1985	Radiólogas Arecibo	Chicas de San Juan	
1986	Radiólogas Arecibo	Criollas de Caguas	
1987	Radiólogas Arecibo	Criollas de Caguas	
1988	Radiólogas Arecibo	Criollas de Caguas	
1989	Leonas de Ponce	Criollas de Caguas	
1990	Leonas de Ponce	Mets de Guaynabo	(Puerto Rico) Damar Muñoz
1991	Leonas de Ponce	Criollas de Caguas	
1992	Chicas de San Juan	Criollas de Caguas	
1993–94	Mets de Guaynabo	Criollas de Caguas	(Puerto Rico) Eva Cruz
1995	Mets de Guaynabo	Criollas de Caguas	(Puerto Rico) Eva Cruz
1996	Criollas de Caguas	Pinkin de Corozal	(Puerto Rico) Vanessa Papaleo
1997	Criollas de Caguas	Llaneras de Toa Baja	(Mexico) Laura Salinas
1998	Criollas de Caguas	Pinkin de Corozal	(Puerto Rico) Vanessa Papaleo
1999	Llaneras de Toa Baja	Criollas de Caguas	(Puerto Rico) Áurea Cruz
2000	Criollas de Caguas	Llaneras de Toa Baja	(Puerto Rico) Yanira Santiago
2001	Criollas de Caguas	Conquistadoras de Guaynabo	(Puerto Rico) Jetzabel Del Valle
2002	Criollas de Caguas	Indias de Mayagüez	(Puerto Rico) Xiomara Molero
2003	Gigantes de Carolina	Conquistadoras de Guaynabo	(United States) Elizabeth Fitzgerald
2004	Gigantes de Carolina	Criollas de Caguas	(United States) Kristee Porter
2005	Criollas de Caguas	Indias de Mayagüez	(United States) Kim Willoughby
2006	Gigantes de Carolina	Pinkin de Corozal	(Puerto Rico) Glorimar Ortega
2007	Valencianas de Juncos	Criollas de Caguas	(Puerto Rico) Karina Ocasio
2008	Pinkin de Corozal	Criollas de Caguas	(Dominican Republic) Milagros Cabral
2009	Llaneras de Toa Baja	Pinkin de Corozal	(Venezuela) Graciela Márquez
2010	Pinkin de Corozal	Llaneras de Toa Baja	(United States) Destinee Hooker
2011	Criollas de Caguas	Mets de Guaynabo	(Puerto Rico) Stephanie Enright
2012	Lancheras de Cataño	Criollas de Caguas	(United States) Courtney Thompson
2013	Indias de Mayagüez	Pinkin de Corozal	(United States) Shonda Cole
2014	Criollas de Caguas	Leonas de Ponce	(Puerto Rico) Shara Venegas
2015	Criollas de Caguas	Indias de Mayagüez	(Puerto Rico) Karina Ocasio
2016	Criollas de Caguas	Capitalinas de San Juan	(Puerto Rico) Stephanie Enright
2017	Criollas de Caguas	Valencianas de Juncos	(Puerto Rico) Ana Sofía Jusino
2018	Season suspended because of Hurricane Maria		
2019	Criollas de Caguas	Changas de Naranjito	(Puerto Rico) Shara Venegas
2020	Season suspended because of COVID-19 pandemic		
2021	Criollas de Caguas	Sanjuaneras de la Capital	
2022	Pinkin de Corozal	Criollas de Caguas	(Puerto Rico) Raymariely Santos
2023	Pinkin de Corozal	Cangrejeras de Santurce	(United States) Tori Dilfer
2024	Cangrejeras de Santurce	Atenienses de Manatí	(Puerto Rico) Debora Seilhamer
2025	Criollas de Caguas	Cangrejeras de Santurce	(United States) Kristin Lux
2026	Cangrejeras de Santurce	Leonas de Ponce	(Mexico) Andrea Rangel

== Performances ==
=== Performance by club ===
Club	Winners	Runners-up	Winning years	Runner-up years
Pinkin de Corozal	19	7	1968, 1969, 1970, 1971, 1972, 1973, 1974, 1975, 1977, 1979, 1980, 1981, 1982, 1983, 1984, 2008, 2010, 2022, 2023	1976, 1978, 1996, 1998, 2006, 2009, 2013
Criollas de Caguas	15	14	1996, 1997, 1998, 2000, 2001, 2002, 2005, 2011, 2014, 2015, 2016, 2017, 2019, 2021, 2025	1986, 1987, 1988, 1989, 1991, 1992, 1993–94, 1995, 1999, 2004, 2007, 2008, 2012, 2022
Capitanas de Arecibo	4	–	1985, 1986, 1987, 1988	–
Mets de Guaynabo	3	5	1978, 1993–94, 1995	1979, 1990, 2001, 2003, 2011
Leonas de Ponce	3	2	1989, 1990, 1991	2014, 2026
Gigantes de Carolina	3	–	2003, 2004, 2006	–
Llaneras de Toa Baja	2	3	1999, 2009	1997, 2000, 2010
Cangrejeras de Santurce	2	2	2024, 2026	2023, 2025
Sanjuaneras de la Capital	1	7	1992	1980, 1981, 1983, 1984, 1985, 2016, 2021
Volleygirls de Guayanilla	1	4	1976	1973, 1974, 1975, 1977
Indias de Mayagüez	1	3	2013	2002, 2005, 2015
Valencianas de Juncos	1	1	2007	2017
Lancheras de Cataño	1	–	2012	–
Dolls de Río Piedras	–	3	–	1969, 1971, 1972
Atenienses de Manatí	–	2	–	1970, 2024
Ingenieras de Hato Rey	–	1	–	1982
Changas de Naranjito	–	1	–	2019

=== Performance by municipality ===
Municipality	Winners	Runners-up
Corozal	19	7
Caguas	15	14
Arecibo	4	–
San Juan	3	13
Guaynabo	3	5
Ponce	3	2
Carolina	3	–
Toa Baja	2	3
Guayanilla	1	4
Mayagüez	1	3
Juncos	1	1
Cataño	1	–
Manatí	–	2
Naranjito	–	1

== MLV ==
In 2026, the first meeting between LVSF and MLV(major league volleyball). The defneding LVSF, Santurce Cangrejeras, will be facing MLV champion, Dallas Pulse, from December 11 and December 13 2026. This will provide both teams preparation for their upcoming seasons.
