= Nomaris Vélez =

Puerto Rican volleyball player (born 1993)

Personal information
- Born: June 11, 1993 (age 33); Bayamón, Puerto Rico

Volleyball information
- Position: Libero
- Current club: San Diego Mojo

National team
2019	Puerto Rico women's national volleyball team

Nomaris Vélez Agosto (Note: In this Spanish name, the first or paternal surname is Vélez and the second or maternal family name is Agosto.) (born June 11, 1993) is a Puerto Rican volleyball player who plays as a libero for the San Diego Mojo of the Pro Volleyball Federation.

== Career ==
In 2019 she made her international debut for the Puerto Rico women's national volleyball team during the Volleyball Challenger Cup qualifiers, where she was awarded the prize for best libero. She competed at the 2019 Women's Pan-American Volleyball Cup. In 2022, she won the bronze medal at the 2022 FIVB Volleyball Women's Challenger Cup, and at the 2022 Norceca Pan American Cup Final Six. She competed at the 2022 FIVB Volleyball Women's World Championship. In 2024, she played in the inaugural Pro Volleyball Federation season as a member of the San Diego Mojo.

She played for Pinkin de Corozal, Indias de Mayagüez, and Changas de Naranjito.
