= Jennifer Quesada =

Puerto Rican volleyball player

Personal information
- Nationality: Puerto Rican
- Born: 22 February 1992 (age 34)
- Height: 188 cm (6 ft 2 in)
- Weight: 71 kg (157 lb)
- Spike: 299 cm (118 in)
- Block: 295 cm (116 in)

Volleyball information
- Position: Middle blocker
- Number: 16

National team
Puerto Rico
Honours
Women's volleyball
Representing Puerto Rico

Jennifer Quesada (born 22 February 1992 in Loíza, Puerto Rico) is a Puerto Rican volleyball player. She plays as a center for the Orientales de Humacao. She played for the Puerto Rico women's national volleyball team. She participated in the 2012 FIVB World Grand Prix, 2013 FIVB World Grand Prix, 2017 FIVB World Grand Prix. She won the bronze medal at the 2017 Women's Pan-American Volleyball Cup.

== Career ==
Jennifer Quesada's career began in the 2010 season, when she played for the Mets de Guaynabo in the Liga de Voleibol Superior Femenino. In the following three championships, she played for Vaqueras de Bayamón. She played in the 2014 championship for Criollas de Caguas.

In the 2015 championship she played for the Changas de Naranjito. In 2016 she was traded to the Orientales de Humacao.
