= Prisilla Rivera =

Dominican Republic volleyball player

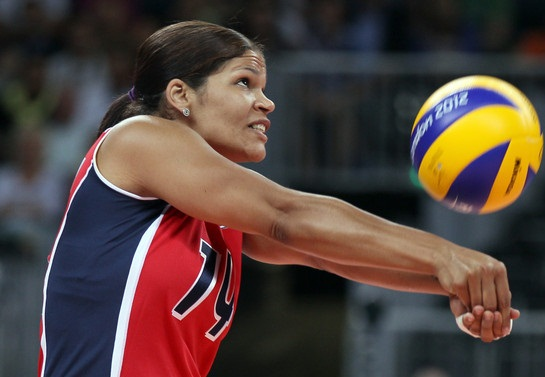

Personal information
- Full name: Prisilla Altagracia Rivera Brens
- Nickname: Priscilla, MvPris
- Nationality: Dominican Republic
- Born: December 29, 1984 (age 41); Santo Domingo
- Hometown: Santo Domingo
- Height: 1.86 m (6 ft 1 in)
- Weight: 70 kg (154 lb)
- Spike: 309 cm (122 in)
- Block: 305 cm (120 in)

Volleyball information
- Position: Wing Spiker; Middle Blocker; Opposite spiker
- Current club: Akari Power Chargers
- Number: 14

National team
2001 - 2021	Dominican Republic
Honours
Women's volleyball
Representing the Dominican Republic
Pan American Games
Gold medal – first place	2019 Lima	Team
Gold medal – first place	2003 Santo Domingo	Team
Bronze medal – third place	2015 Toronto	Team
World Grand Champions Cup
Bronze medal – third place	2009 Tokyo/Fukuoka	Team
NORCECA Championship
Gold medal – first place	2021 Guadalajara	Team
Gold medal – first place	2019 San Juan	Team
Gold medal – first place	2009 Bayamón	Team
Silver medal – second place	2013 Omaha	Team
Silver medal – second place	2011 Caguas	Team
Bronze medal – third place	2005 Port of Spain	Team
Bronze medal – third place	2003 Santo Domingo	Team
Bronze medal – third place	2001 Santo Domingo	Team
Pan-American Cup
Gold medal – first place	2021 Santo Domingo	Team
Gold medal – first place	2010 Rosarito/Tijuana	Team
Gold medal – first place	2008 Mexicali/Tijuana	Team
Silver medal – second place	2018 Santo Domingo	Team
Silver medal – second place	2015 Lima/Callao	Team
Silver medal – second place	2013 Lima	Team
Silver medal – second place	2011 Ciudad Juárez	Team
Silver medal – second place	2009 Miami	Team
Silver medal – second place	2005 Santo Domingo	Team
Bronze medal – third place	2006 San Juan	Team
Central American and Caribbean Games
Gold medal – first place	2006 Cartagena	Team
Gold medal – first place	2010 Mayagüez	Team
Gold medal – first place	2014 Veracruz	Team
Gold medal – first place	2018 Barranquilla	Team
Final Four Cup
Silver medal – second place	2008 Fortaleza	Team
Bronze medal – third place	2009 Lima	Team
- Last updated: January 2022

Prisilla Altagracia Rivera Brens (born December 29, 1984, in Santo Domingo) is a volleyball player from the Dominican Republic.

== Career ==
=== 2000-2001 ===
Rivera debuted in 2000 at the Nacional District Superior Tournament with Los Prados, being elected Rookie of the Year. She played with the Girls National Team at the 2001 FIVB U18 World Championship in Pula, Croatia, helping her team to reach the 8th place. That year, she also played with the senior team at the 2001 NORCECA Championship winning with her team the bronze medal.

=== 2003-2004 ===
With her National Team, she won the gold medal at the 2003 Pan American Games.

She competed for her native country at the 2004 Summer Olympics in Athens, Greece, wearing the number #14 jersey. There she ended up in eleventh place with the Dominican Republic women's national team. Rivera played as a middle-blocker.

=== 2005-2006 ===
Playing in home soil Professional Tournament, Prisilla won the "Metropolitan League Championship" with her team Los Prados and awarded "Final Series Most Valuable Player". This year she was selected "Best attacker" at the Salonpas Cup.

At the 2006 FIVB Grand Prix, Prisilla Altagracia helped her team to finish in the 8th place, not qualifying for the final round.

=== 2007-2009 ===
Won with her team Grupo Murcia 2002, the 2007 Supercup, her team also win the Superliga, and Queens Cup.

For the 2008/2009 season with Grupo 2002 Murcia won the "Most valuable player" award at the Spanish Supercopa won by her team and the same award, MVP at the 2008/2009 Superliga Championship and the 2008/2009 Queen's Cup.

=== 2010 ===
As the captain of her club, CAV Murcia 2005 she won her 11th title with this Spanish club, the 2010 Spanish Queen's Cup Spanish: Copa de la Reina, defeating Universidad de Burgos in Monforte de Lemos, Lugo.

She won the Most Valuable Player and the gold medal with her National Team at the 2010 Pan-American Cup held in Rosarito and Tijuana, Mexico. She also won in Puerto Rico the Central American and Caribbean Games gold medal.

=== 2011 ===
Rivera won with CAV Murcia 2005 the 2011 Spanish Queen's Cup Championship, contributing with 25 points, winning her fifth consecutive Spanish Cup.

After being competing in Murcia since 2006, Rivera left CAV Murcia to join the Puerto Rican team Mets de Guaynabo, in late March 2011. Prisilla and her team finished the season as League Runner-Up, after being swept away in 4 matches by Criollas de Caguas.

With her national team, Rivera won the "Best spiker" award and the silver medal at the 2011 Pan-American Cup. Rivera signed with the Brazilian club Vôlei Bauru.

=== 2012- ===
Rivera joined fellow Dominican Brenda Castillo and national team head coach Marcos Kwiek in the Brazilian Super League club Concilig Vôlei Bauru for the 2016/17 season.

=== 2018 ===
Taking the 2017/18 season of the Turkish Second Division club Sarıyer Belediyesi, when this club changed their roster in early 2018 adding Rivera and Puerto Rican Áurea Cruz to recover from the club's sixth place at that time. Rivera was awarded Most Valuable Player and became league champion at the 2018 Dominican Republic Superior Volleyball League from the National District, playing with the team Caribeñas VC. At the 2018 Central American and Caribbean Games, Rivera won with her team the gold medal and the Most Valuable Player award. During the inaugural Nations League her national had a 3–12 mark ranking in the fourteenth place. Her team lost 2–3 in the final match of the Pan-American Cup, winning the silver medal. She was awarded the Best Libero, Best Digger and Best Receiver. Rivera played the World Championship in Japan, her team was 3–2 in the first round and had a 5–4 mark after the second round and finishing in the ninth place when they could not qualify for the third round.

=== 2019 ===
She was transferred to Guerreras VC for the 2019 Dominican Republic Superior Volleyball League season. In Peru, at the Pan-American Cup, her team finished in the tournament's second place, losing 0–3 to the United States. She took her second continental games golden medal when she won the Pan American Games gold medal. Later she played in Puerto Rico the NORCECA Championship, winning the gold medal by defeating 3-2 the United States.

=== 2020 ===
After the Olympic Qualification Tournament held in Santo Domingo, where her national team achieved the Olympic spot undefeated, Rivera traveled to Budapest, to join the Hungarian League club Újpest UTE. She was able to win with her team and claimed she loved the city, but that was a little cold for her. Just days later she was shocked with the news that her only daughter, Megan Prisilla Logroño Rivera had died and she had to travel back to Santo Domingo, ending her participation. It was then revealed by Cristóbal Marte, president of the National Project for Women's Volleyball Teams, that Rivera joined the Hungarian league late, losing wages from October to December in order to help her national team in the Olympic qualifier.

Together with other twelve women, Rivera was awarded with the Medal of Merit of the Dominican Woman in the context of the International Women's Day by the 98-20 president Danilo Medina decree. She later expressed that she would postpone her retirement because the COVID-19 restrictions forced the postponement of the 2020 Summer Olympics, that she has planned to stay connected to her sport when she leaves the court and how deeply her life have just changed overnight.

=== 2021 ===
Rivera played her last Nations League where her team performed greatly posting a 9–6 mark, valid for a sixth place rank. Rivera was set to retire after her participation in the Olympic tournament and she mas name flag bearer along with boxer Rodrigo Marte, and they both entered the Parade of Nations as part of the 64 Dominican representatives, dancing Merengue. Rivera's team lost 0–3 to Serbia, 2–3 to Brazil, 2–3 to South Korea, before finally winning 3–0 to Kenya and 3–1 to Japan, qualifying to the quarterfinals. But in the quarterfinals, they lost 0–3 to the United States to end their Olympic hopes and ranking eight with her team. She remarked that this result left everyone unsatisfied and it was the whole team responsibility.

In the NORCECA Championship she helped her national team to continental championship gold and qualification for the 2022 World Championship. She also secured the Best Outside Spiker award. The Dominican had an undefeated record during the Pan-American Cup winning their fifth tournmament gold medal to Mexico. As team captain, Rivera played the final match as her last one for her national team, having previously announced your retirement, she was called for substitution at the end of the third set, she came back and kissed the court as farewell and received a standing ovation being congratulated by both team players. After being awarded as Most Valuable Player and the Best Outside Hitter in the last of her 20 years service representing her country.

Cristo Rey was the third club from the Dominican Republic Superior Volleyball League from the National District that saw Rivera playing, when she was transferred for the 2021 season. She became league champion and awarded Most Valuable Player and Best Scorer. She then received recognitions from Gala Mazine, where she expressed that she was unsure if she have chosen volleyball or the game chose her; the city of Santo Domingo, that named her Meritorious Daughter; and the Senate of the Dominican Republic, where she was considered a reference for the younger generations and example of bravery and determination, recalling when she used sacrifice herself walking from her neighbourhood, Villa Consuelo to olympic complex, in order to achieve her dreams. The Dominican Republic Hall of Fame invited her to carry Hall's flag during the 2021 class ceremony.

She signed for the club Jakarta Pertamina Energi from the Indonesian Proliga for the 2022 season.

== Clubs ==
- (Dominican Republic) San Pedro (1998–2001)
- (Dominican Republic) Los Prados (2000)
- (Dominican Republic) Mirador (2002–2004)
- (Dominican Republic) Los Prados (2005)
- (Spain) Grupo 2002 Murcia (2006–2008)
- (Spain) CAV Murcia 2005 (2008–2011)
- (Puerto Rico) Mets de Guaynabo (2011)
- (Azerbaijan) Igtisadchi Baku (2011–2012)
- (Puerto Rico) Pinkin de Corozal (2013)
- (Azerbaijan) Lokomotiv Baku (2013–2014)
- (Turkey) Bursa (2014–2015)
- (Italy) Südtirol Neruda Bolzano (2015–2016)
- (Brazil) Concilig Vôlei Bauru (2016–2017)
- (Turkey) Sarıyer Belediyesi (2017–2018)
- (Dominican Republic) Caribeñas VC (2018)
- (Dominican Republic) Guerreras VC (2019)
- (Hungary) Újpest UTE (2020)
- (Dominican Republic) Cristo Rey (2021)
- (Indonesia) Jakarta Pertamina Energi (2022)
- (Philippines) Akari Power Chargers (2022)

== Awards ==
=== Individuals ===
- 2000 Nacional District Superior Tournament "Rookie of the Year"
- 2005 Dominican Metropolitan League Final Series "Most valuable player"
- 2005 Salonpas Cup "Best attacker"
- 2006/2007 Spanish Second Division "Most valuable player"
- 2007/2008 Spanish Superliga Final Series "Most valuable player"
- 2008/2009 Spanish Queens Cup "Most valuable player"
- 2008/2009 Spanish Superliga Final Series "Most valuable player"
- 2009 NORCECA Championship "Most valuable player"
- 2009 Spanish Super Cup "Most valuable player"
- 2009/2010 Spanish Queens Cup "Most valuable player"
- 2010 Pan-American Cup "Most valuable player"
- 2011 Pan-American Cup "Best spiker"
- 2018 Dominican Republic Superior Volleyball League "Most valuable player"
- 2018 Central American and Caribbean Games "Most valuable player"
- 2021 NORCECA Championship "Best outside hitter"
- 2021 Pan-American Cup "Best outside hitter"
- 2021 Pan-American Cup "Most valuable player"
- 2021 Dominican Republic Superior Volleyball League "Most valuable player"
- 2021 Dominican Republic Superior Volleyball League "Best scorer"

=== Clubs ===
- 2005 Dominican Metropolitan League – Champion, with Los Prados
- 2006 Spanish Supercup – Champion, with Grupo 2002 Murcia
- 2007 Spanish Supercup – Champion, with Grupo 2002 Murcia
- 2007 CEV Top Teams Cup – Champion, with Grupo 2002 Murcia
- 2007 Spanish Superliga – Champion, with Grupo 2002 Murcia
- 2007 Spanish Queen's Cup – Champion, with Grupo 2002 Murcia
- 2008 Spanish Superliga – Champion, with Grupo 2002 Murcia
- 2008 Spanish Queen's Cup – Champion, with Murcia 2005
- 2009 Spanish Superliga – Champion, with Murcia 2005
- 2009 Spanish Queen's Cup – Champion, with Murcia 2005
- 2009 Spanish Supercup – Champion, with Murcia 2005
- 2010 Spanish Queen's Cup – Champion, with Murcia 2005
- 2010 Spanish Supercup – Champion, with Murcia 2005
- 2011 Spanish Queen's Cup – Champion, with Murcia 2005
- 2011 Puerto Rican League – Runner-Up, with Mets de Guaynabo
- 2013 Puerto Rican League – Runner-Up, with Pinkin de Corozal
- 2014–15 CEV Challenge Cup – Champions, with Bursa BBSK
- 2018 Dominican Republic Superior Volleyball League – Champion, with Caribeñas VC
- 2021 Dominican Republic Superior Volleyball League – Champion, with Cristo Rey

Olympic Games
Preceded by Luguelín Santos	Flagbearer for Dominican Republic (with Rodrigo Marte); Tokyo 2020	Succeeded by Audrys Nin Reyes; Marileidy Paulino
