= Mario Morales Coliseum =

Indoor sports arena located in Guaynabo, Puerto Rico

Mario Morales Coliseum Coliseo Mario Morales
- El Quijote
- Interactive map of Mario Morales Coliseum; Coliseo Mario Morales
- Former names: Mets Pavilion
- Location: Guaynabo, Puerto Rico
- Owner: Municipality of Guaynabo
- Operator: Municipality of Guaynabo
- Capacity: 5,500 (approx. maximum)

Construction
- Opened: 1983

Tenants
- Guaynabo Mets, BSN; Mets de Guaynabo, LVSF

Mario "Quijote" Morales Coliseum (Spanish: Coliseo Mario Morales) is an indoor sporting arena that is located in Guaynabo, Puerto Rico. The coliseum's seating capacity is 5,500 seats. It is the home arena of the Mets de Guaynabo basketball team, the Mets de Guaynabo men's volleyball in the LVSM and the Mets de Guaynabo women's volleyball in the LVSF.The coliseum is also used for boxing, roller derby and musical acts.

The coliseum opened in 1983, originally named Mets Pavilion, was renamed in 1998 after Puerto Rican basketball player Mario Morales. In 2013 a statue of Mario Morales was unveiled and now perpetuates his legacy as a player. In addition to the unveiling of Quijote's statue, four stars were also presented, placed on the sidewalk in front of the court, bearing the names of other illustrious players.

Original Mario "Quijote" Morales Coliseum

In August 2020, it also became the venue where COVID-19 testing was done during the COVID-19 pandemic.

As of 2025, the Municipality of Guaynabo has been remodeling the arena. The project has been valued at $17 million and is currently scheduled to be finished by March of 2028. The remodeling will reduce capacity to 5,000 but will improve seats and add 2 VIP sections. The current men's volleyball team has decided to not participate in the league until 2027-2028. Meanwhile, the men's basketball team has been playing in arenas in Gurabo.
