= Lynda Morales =

Puerto Rican volleyball player

Personal information
- Nationality: Puerto Rican
- Born: May 20, 1988 (age 38); Glendale, California, U.S.
- Hometown: Fallbrook, California, U.S.
- Height: 1.88 m (6 ft 2 in)
- Weight: 77 kg (170 lb)
- Spike: 303 cm (119 in)
- Block: 298 cm (117 in)
- Education: California State

Volleyball information
- Position: Middle blocker
- Current club: Alba Blaj
- Number: 17

Career
Years	Teams
2014	Mets de Guaynabo
2015	RC Cola Raiders
2016	Cignal HD Spikers
2016	PSL-F2 Logistics Manila
2017	Criollas de Caguas
2018	Alba Blaj

National team
2011–2016	Puerto Rico
Medal record
Women's volleyball
Representing Puerto Rico
NORCECA Championship
Bronze medal – third place	2013 Omaha	Team
Bronze medal – third place	2015 Michoacan	Team
Pan-American Cup
Silver medal – second place	2016 Santo Domingo	Team
Bronze medal – third place	2014 Mexico City	Team
Central American and Caribbean Games
Silver medal – second place	2014 Veracruz	Team

Lynda Morales (born May 20, 1988) is a Puerto Rican former indoor volleyball player. She was a member of the Puerto Rican national team from 2011 to 2016. She participated in the 2016 Summer Olympics and the 2014 FIVB World Championship.

Morales twice won the bronze medal in the NORCECA Championship, in 2013 and 2015 when she was awarded Best Middle Blocker. She won the Pan-American Cup silver medal in 2016 after the bronze taken in 2014. She also won the silver medal at the 2014 Central American and Caribbean Games.

== Personal life ==
Morales was born on May 20, 1988, in Glendale, California. She is 1.88 m (6 ft 2 in) tall and 74 kg (163 lb). She went to Fallbrook High School in Fallbrook, California, but finished at Centennial High School in Bakersfield, California, and later enrolled in the California State University, Northridge majoring in Family and Consumer Sciences - Consumer Affairs. Even though she was born in the United States and has double citizenship, she opted for Puerto Rican sports citizenship.

== Career ==
Playing as a center, Morales was awarded all-league Second Team in basketball and as volleyball player 2005 All-Southwest Yosemite League. She also practiced high jump while in high school. With the Cal State Northridge Matadors, Morales was included in the 2008 Sacramento State All-Tournament Team.

Morales was drafted for the Puerto Rican League by the club Llaneras de Toa Baja. On 8 November 8, 2011, Morales was transferred to Gigantes de Carolina for two players, Tatiana Encarnación and Grace Saladobut and later was transferred again to Mets de Guaynabo on 30 November 2011 for the first pick of the 2013 draft and cash. She played with Mets de Guaynabo from 2012 to 2013, being selected for the All-Star game in 2013.

At the 2013 NORCECA Championship, Morales helped Puerto Rico to win the bronze medal, the second meal ever in the continental championship, when her team defeated 3–0 to Canada. She then signed with the Brazilian Superleague club Minas Tênis Clube for the 2013–14 season.

=== 2014 ===
After the Brazilian league, she returned to the Puerto Rican league, playing for Mets de Guaynabo in 2014. She was named among the World Championship qualifier team, winning the berth for the World Championship after winning all three matches against Costa Rica, Saint Lucia and Barbados. She won with her national team the bronze medal in the 2014 Pan-American Cup, the first medal ever in this continental competitions. She was named to represent Puerto Rico during the 2014 Central American and Caribbean Games, and her national team reached the volleyball tournament final match, winning the silver medal when her team lost to the Dominican Republic 0–3. She played the 2014 FIVB World Championship in Italy, but her team could not make it to the second round ending up in with a 1–4 mark and a tied 17th rank. After the World Championship, Morales traveled to Turkey and signed with the club Beşiktaş from Istanbul to play the Turkish league season 2014-2015.

=== 2015 ===
Citing administration problems, Morales club in the Puerto Rican league withdraw its league participation for the 2015 season and all the player were drafted and she was picked in first round by Criollas de Caguas. When the season was over for her Turkish team she returned to the Puerto Rican league with Criollas de Caguas, recalling her experience in Turkey for the lack of physical preparation as disappointing and a no postseason result. Morales joined her national team in the 2015 Pan-American Cup, but her team lost their quarterfinal match 2–3 to Cuba and the 5/6 placement match 1–3 to Canada to settle in the sixth place of the tournament. Her national team then headed to Toronto, Canada to play the 2015 Pan American Games, were her team lost the bronze medal match to the Dominican Republic.

With her national team she won the 2015 NORCECA Championship bronze medal after defeating 3–1 the Canadian national team, and after finishing with 19 blocks, she was awarded tournament's Best Middle Blocker. She then played with the Filipino club RC Cola Air Force Raiders in the 2015 Philippine Super Liga Grand Prix Conference. She later confessed that she was attracted to the Philippines because she was told by former league player how passionate the fans were. She was also pointed out for the RC Cola Air Force Raiders coach Rhovyl Verayo as a key player in both, team offense and defense. For her performance through all the 2015 year, Morales was awarded by the Puerto Rico Olympic Committee and the Puerto Rican Volleyball Federation in the Olympic Awards as the Volleyball Player of the Year.

=== 2016 ===
Morales returned to play with Criollas de Caguas for the 2016 season, but she suffered an injury in the right ankle and was replaced temporally by Laudevis Marrero. But she returned to help her club to win league championship. Soon after that, Morales participated with her national team in the 2016 Summer Olympics second qualifier, winning for the first time the berth to the 2016 Summer Olympics.

She won the silver medal in the 2016 Pan-American Cup held in Santo Domingo, when her national team lost 2–3 from the Dominican Republic. Morales was selected to represent Puerto Rico during the 2016 Summer Olympics. Her national team ended up in tied 11th place finishing with a 0–5 in their first ever Olympic participation. Even though she was hoping to sign for a European club after the Olympics, she signed with the Cignal HD Spikers to play the 2016 Philippine Super Liga Grand Prix Conference. She later recalled how disappointed she was when she could not get an important contract after having such a good summer season.

She was later announced to join the Philippines representatives for the 2016 FIVB Club World Championship, PSL-F2 Logistics Manila. Morales retired herself from her national team after the 2016 Summer Olympics.

=== 2017 ===
She joined the Puerto Rican season in the later stages, nonetheless, she won the championship with Criollas de Caguas. After the Puerto Rican season, she dedicated herself to play beach volleyball and teaching. She then played with the Association of Volleyball Professionals 2017 sand tour, partnering Desirae Elizondo, Lillian Raney and Andrea Nucete. She also joined the Temecula Valley Volleyball varsity team and the Viper club as coach.

=== 2018 ===
For the second half of the 2017/18 Romanian League season, she signed with the club Alba Blaj, replacing the Brazilian Renata de Andrade Maggioni.

== Clubs ==
- (Puerto Rico) Llaneras de Toa Baja (2011)
- (Puerto Rico) Mets de Guaynabo (2012-2013)
- (Brazil) Minas Tênis Clube (2013-2014)
- (Puerto Rico) Mets de Guaynabo (2014)
- (Turkey) Beşiktaş (2014-2015)
- (Puerto Rico) Criollas de Caguas (2015)
- (Philippines) RC Cola Air Force Raiders (2015)
- (Puerto Rico) Criollas de Caguas (2016)
- (Philippines) Cignal HD Spikers (2016)
- (Philippines) PSL-F2 Logistics Manila (2016)
- (Puerto Rico) Criollas de Caguas (2017)
- (Romania) Alba Blaj (2018)

== Awards ==
=== Individuals ===
- 2013 Puerto Rican League "All-Star"
- 2015 NORCECA Championship "Best Middle Blocker"
- 2015 Puerto Rican "Volleyball Player of the Year"

=== Clubs ===
- 2014 Puerto Rican League - Champion, with Criollas de Caguas
- 2015 Puerto Rican League - Champion, with Criollas de Caguas
- 2016 Puerto Rican League - Champion, with Criollas de Caguas
- 2017 Puerto Rican League - Champion, with Criollas de Caguas
- 2017–18 CEV Champions League - Runner-Up, with CSM Volei Alba Blaj
