= Karina Ocasio =

Puerto Rican volleyball player (born 1985)

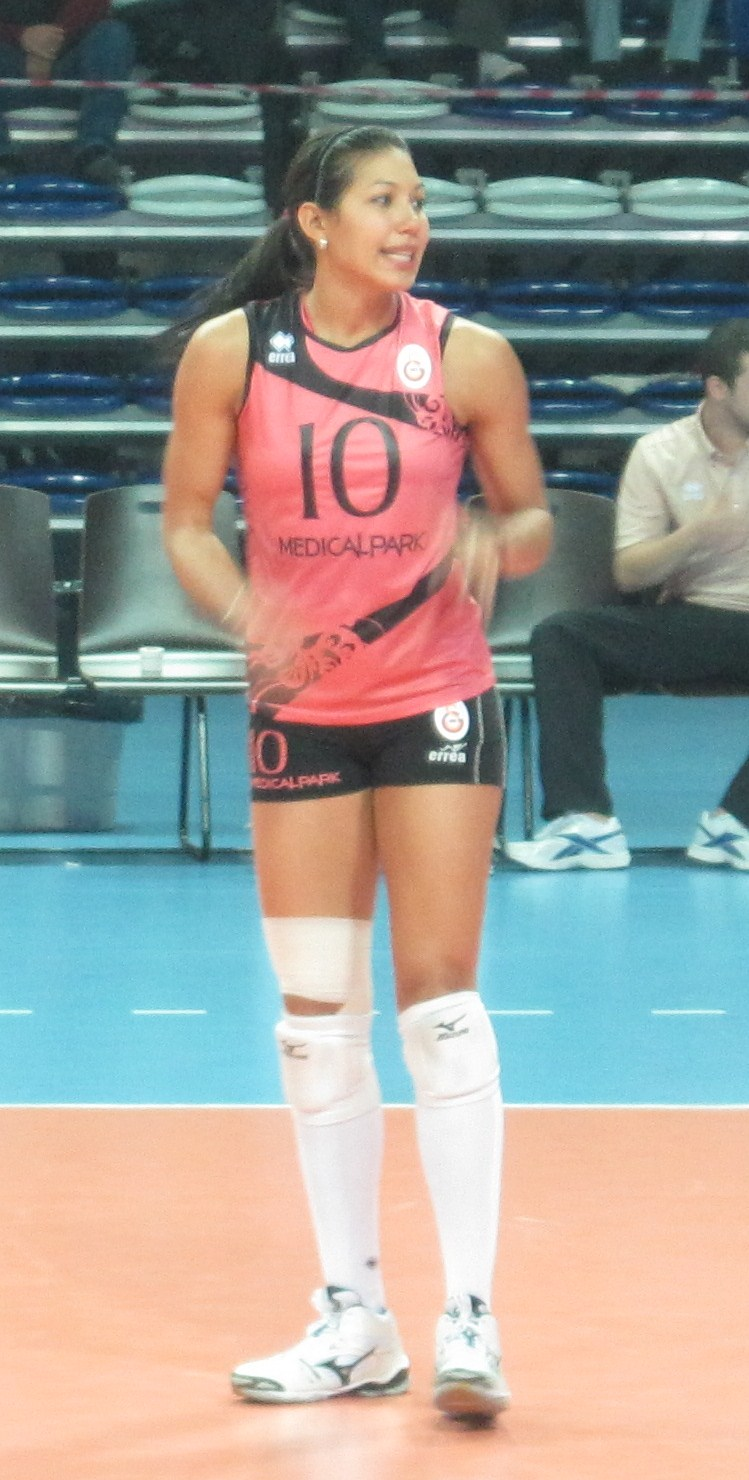
- Ocasio playing for Galatasaray in 2010

Personal information
- Full name: Karina Ocasio Clemente
- Nationality: Puerto Rican
- Born: August 1, 1985 (age 41) Bayamón, Puerto Rico
- Height: 1.92 m (6 ft 4 in)
- Weight: 72 kg (159 lb)
- Spike: 298 cm (117 in)
- Block: 288 cm (113 in)

Volleyball information
- Position: Opposite hitter
- Current club: Mets de Guaynabo
- Number: 11

Career
- Years: Team
- 2000–2003: Conquistadoras de Guaynabo
- 2003–2004: Despar Sirio Perugia
- 2004–2005: Caoduro Cavazzale
- 2005–2008: Valencianas de Juncos
- 2008–2010: Heungkuk Life Pink Spiders
- 2010–2011: Galatasaray Medical Park
- 2013–2014: Hwaseong IBK Altos
- 2014: Criollas de Caguas
- 2014–2015: Fujian Xi Meng Bao
- 2015: Criollas de Caguas
- 2015–2016: Fujian Yango
- 2017: Criollas de Caguas
- 2018: Jakarta BNI 46
- 2019–2021: Criollas de Caguas
- 2022–2023: Al-Ahly
- 2023–: Mets de Guaynabo

National team
- Years: Team
- 2002–: Puerto Rico
Medal record
Women's volleyball
Representing Puerto Rico
Central American and Caribbean Games
Silver medal – second place	2010 Mayagüez	Team
Bronze medal – third place	2006 Cartagena	Team
Pan-American Cup
Silver medal – second place	2016 Santo Domingo	Team
Bronze medal – third place	2009 Miami	Team
- Updated on September 12, 2016

Karina Ocasio Clemente (born August 1, 1985) is a volleyball player who plays for the Puerto Rico women's national team.

== Club career ==
- (Puerto Rico) Conquistadoras de Guaynabo (2000–2003)
- (Italy) Despar Sirio Perugia (2003–2004)
- (Italy) Caoduro Cavazzale (2004–2005)
- (Puerto Rico) Valencianas de Juncos (2005–2008)
- (South Korea) Heungkuk Life Pink Spiders (2008–2010)
- (Turkey) Galatasaray Medical Park (2010–2011)
- (Puerto Rico) Criollas de Caguas (2013)
- (South Korea) Hwaseong IBK Altos (2013–2014)
- (Puerto Rico) Criollas de Caguas (2014)
- (China) Fujian Xi Meng Bao (2014–2015)
- (Puerto Rico) Criollas de Caguas (2015)
- (China) Fujian Yango (2015–2016)
- (Puerto Rico) Criollas de Caguas (2017)
- (India) Jakarta BNI 46 (2018)
- (Puerto Rico) Criollas de Caguas (2019–2021)
- (Egypt) Al-Ahly (2022–2023)
- (Puerto Rico) Mets de Guaynabo (2023–present)

== International career ==
Ocasio was part of the Puerto Rico women's national volleyball team at the 2002 FIVB Volleyball Women's World Championship in Germany., 2015 FIVB World Grand Prix, and 2022 FIVB Volleyball Women's World Championship.

She competed at the 2008 Olympic Qualification Tournament in Japan, where her team ended up in eighth and last place, having received a wild card for the event after Peru and Kenya withdrew. However, she became Best Scorer at the event, alongside Kazakhstan's Yelena Pavlova. She also won the Best Scorer award at the 2015 Pan American Games, losing the bronze medal to the Dominican Republic 1–3.

== Awards ==
Club

Valencianas de Juncos

- Liga de Voleibol Superior Femenino: 2007

Criollas de Caguas

- Liga de Voleibol Superior Femenino: 2014, 2015, 2016, 2017, 2019, 2021

Heungkuk Life Pink Spiders

- V-League: 2009

Al Ahly

- Egyptian League: 2022–23

Individual

- 2008 Olympic Qualifier "Best scorer"
- 2015 NORCECA Champions Cup "Best opposite spiker"
- 2015 Pan American Games "Best scorer"
