= Xiomara Molero =

Puerto Rican volleyball player and coach

Personal information
- Full name: Xiomara Molero Jiménez
- Nationality: Puerto Rican
- Born: April 23, 1971 (age 55) Río Piedras, Puerto Rico
- Height: 1.73 m (5 ft 8 in)
- Weight: 70 kg (154 lb)
- Spike: 295 cm (116 in)
- Block: 262 cm (103 in)

Volleyball information

National team
- Years: Team
- 1987-2005: Puerto Rico

Xiomara Molero Jiménez (born April 23, 1971, in Río Piedras, Puerto Rico) is a retired Puerto Rican female volleyball player and coach that played with the Puerto Rican national team at the 2002 FIVB Volleyball Women's World Championship.

== Career ==
She was part of the Puerto Rico women's national volleyball team at the 2002 FIVB Volleyball Women's World Championship in Germany, She played for Criollas de Caguas in 2002. In 2015, she coached the U20 Puerto Rican team.

== Personal info ==
Molero's parents, Ramón Molero and Andrea Jiménez, are Dominicans who migrated to Puerto Rico.

== Clubs ==
- (Puerto Rico) Mets de Guaynabo (1987-2000)
- (Puerto Rico) Criollas de Caguas (2001-2006)
