= Dulce Téllez =

Cuban volleyball player (born 1983)

Personal information
- Full name: Dulce María Téllez Palacio
- Born: 12 September 1983 (age 43); Santiago de Cuba, Cuba
- Height: 1.79 m (5 ft 10 in)

Volleyball information
- Position: Middle blocker
- Number: 16 (national team)

National team
2003–2006	Cuba
Honours
Women's volleyball
Representing Cuba
Olympic Games
Bronze medal – third place	2004 Athens	Team

Dulce María Téllez Palacio (born 12 September 1983), also known as Dulce Téllez, is a Cuban volleyball player who competed with the Cuban women's national volleyball team in the 2004 Summer Olympics and won the bronze medal.

== 2006 Defection ==
On 2 July 2006, during international competition in Puerto Rico, Téllez requested political asylum. She left the hotel where her team was staying at 3:00 in the morning. She had played the day before and defeated Venezuela.

== Clubs ==
- (Puerto Rico) Mets de Guaynabo (2010-2011)
