= Fernanda Guitron =

Mexican volleyball player (born 1996)

Personal information
- Nationality: Mexican
- Born: 7 March 1996 (age 30)
- Height: 183 cm (6 ft 0 in)
- Weight: 78 kg (172 lb)
- Spike: 295 cm (116 in)
- Block: 288 cm (113 in)

Career
Years	Teams
2014	Jalisco

National team
2014	Mexico

Fernanda Guitron (born 7 March 1996) is a Mexican female volleyball player. She is part of the Mexico women's national volleyball team.

She participated in the 2014 FIVB Volleyball World Grand Prix. On club level she played for JALISCO in 2014.
