= Kaomi Solís =

Mexican volleyball player (born 1994)

Personal information
- Nationality: Mexico
- Born: 6 August 1994 (age 32)
- Height: 1.60 m (5 ft 3 in)
- Weight: 56 kg (123 lb)
- Spike: 250 cm (98 in)
- Block: 240 cm (94 in)

Volleyball information
- Number: 21

Career
Years	Teams
2014	(Mexico) Colima

Kaomi Solís (born 6 August 1994) is a Mexican female volleyball player. She is a member of the Mexico women's national volleyball team and played for Colima in 2014.

She was part of the Mexico national team at the 2014 FIVB Volleyball Women's World Championship in Italy.

== Clubs ==
- (Mexico) Colima (2014)
