= Jennifer Lundquist =

Canadian volleyball player

Personal information
- Nationality: Canada
- Born: 10 September 1991 (age 35); Edmonton, Alberta
- Hometown: Surrey, British Columbia
- Height: 1.8 m (5 ft 11 in)
- Spike: 300 cm (120 in)
- Block: 284 cm (112 in)

Volleyball information
- Number: 19

Jennifer Lundquist (born 10 September 1991) is a Canadian female volleyball player. She is a member of the Canada women's national volleyball team. She was part of the Canadian national team at the 2014 FIVB Volleyball Women's World Championship in Italy.
