= Dulce Carranza =

Mexican volleyball player

Personal information
- Nationality: Mexico
- Born: 29 June 1990 (age 36)
- Height: 1.78 m (5 ft 10 in)
- Weight: 83 kg (183 lb)
- Spike: 275 cm (108 in)
- Block: 252 cm (99 in)

Volleyball information
- Number: 8

Career
| Years | Teams |
|---|---|
| 2014 | (Mexico) Nuevo León |

Dulce Carranza (born 29 June 1990) is a Mexican female volleyball player. She is a member of the Mexico women's national volleyball team and played for Nuevo León in 2014.

She was part of the Mexico national team at the 2014 FIVB Volleyball Women's World Championship in Italy, and the 2015 FIVB World Grand Prix.

== Clubs ==
- (Mexico) Nuevo León (2014)
