= Lizeth López =

Mexican volleyball player

Personal information
- Nationality: Mexico
- Born: 14 May 1990 (age 36)
- Height: 1.64 m (5 ft 5 in)
- Weight: 62 kg (137 lb)
- Spike: 277 cm (109 in)
- Block: 252 cm (99 in)

Volleyball information
- Number: 2

Career
Years	Teams
2014	(Mexico) Baja California

Lizeth López (born 14 May 1990) is a Mexican female volleyball player. She is a member of the Mexico women's national volleyball team and played for Baja California in 2014.

She was part of the Mexico national team at the 2014 FIVB Volleyball Women's World Championship in Italy. and 2018 FIVB Volleyball Women's World Championship.

== Clubs ==
- (Mexico) Baja California (2014)
