= Jenna Hagglund =

American volleyball player

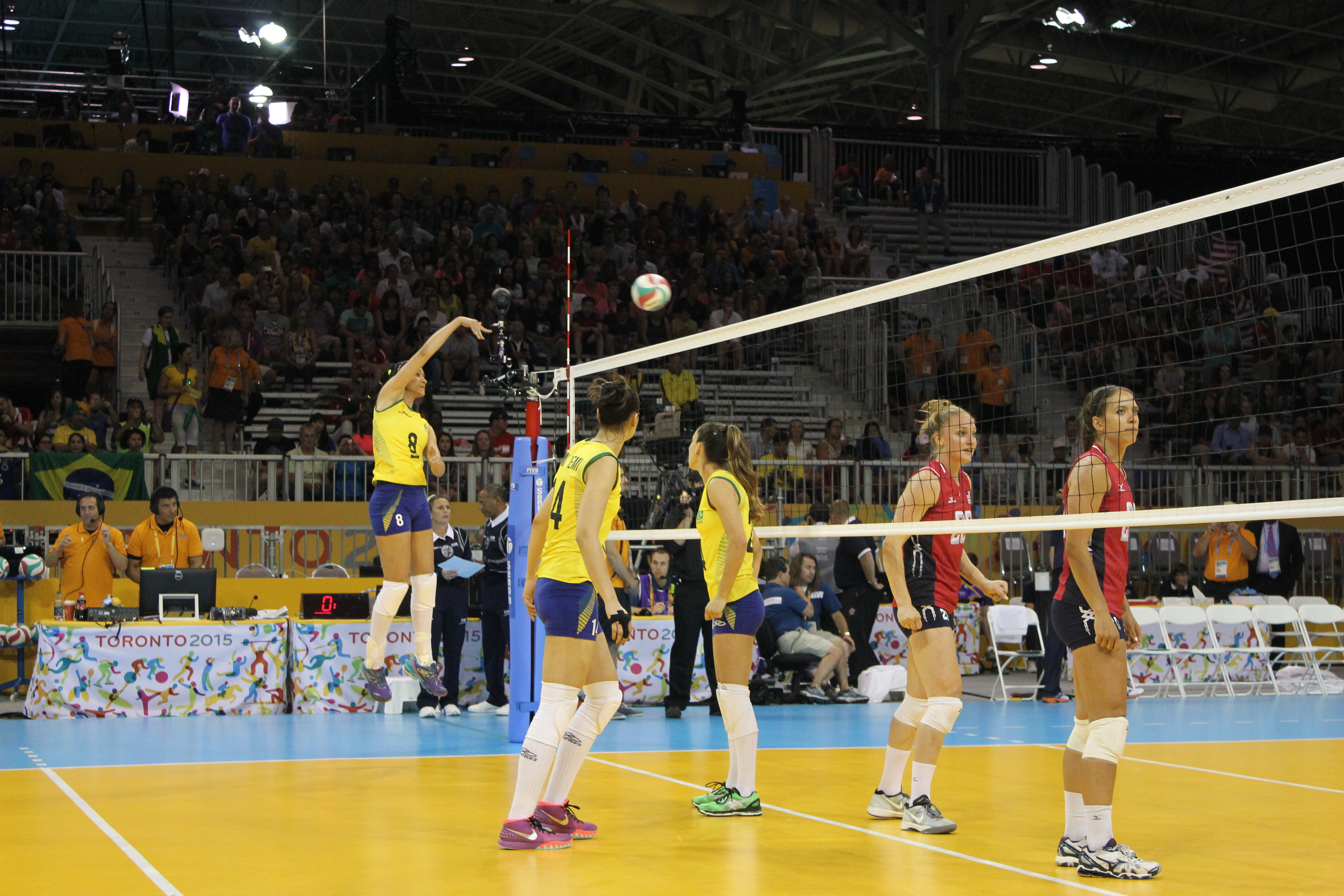
- Jenna Hagglund in 2015 (far right)

Personal information
- Nationality: American
- Born: May 28, 1989 (age 37)
- Height: 5 ft 10 in (1.78 m)
- Weight: 150 lb (68 kg)
- Spike: 115 in (292 cm)
- Block: 110 in (290 cm)
- Education: University of Washington

National team
United States

Jenna Hagglund (born 28 May 1989) is an American female volleyball player.

== Career ==
She was member of the United States national team that won the 2015 Pan American Games gold medal, and the 2013 FIVB Women's World Grand Champions Cup.

On the college level, she played for University of Washington.

On the club level she played for Futura Volley in 2013.
