= Andrea Kinsale =

Trinidad and Tobago volleyball player (born 1989)

Personal information
- Nationality: Trinidad and Tobago
- Born: 24 December 1989 (age 36)
- Height: 188 cm (74 in)
- Weight: 65 kg (143 lb)
- Spike: 315 cm (124 in)
- Block: 297 cm (117 in)

Volleyball information
- Number: 1 (national team)

National team
2010-2011	Trinidad and Tobago

Andrea Kinsale (born 24 December 1989) is a retired Trinidad and Tobago female volleyball player. She was part of the Trinidad and Tobago women's national volleyball team.

She participated at the 2011 Women's Pan-American Volleyball Cup.
