= Heidy Rodríguez (volleyball) =

Cuban volleyball player (born 1993)

Heidy Margarita Rodriguez López

Personal information
- Full name: Heidy Margarita Rodríguez López
- Nationality: Cuban
- Born: 24 June 1993 (age 33)
- Height: 1.87 m (6 ft 2 in)
- Weight: 66 kg (146 lb)
- Spike: 312 cm (123 in)
- Block: 308 cm (121 in)

Career
| Years | Teams |
|---|---|
| 2014 | Villa Clara |

National team
| 2014 | Cuba |

Heidy Margarita Rodríguez López (born 24 June 1993) is a Cuban female volleyball player. She is part of the Cuba women's national volleyball team. On club level she played for Villa Clara in 2014.

== Clubs ==
- (Czech Republic) Agel Prostějov (2016-2017)

== Awards ==
=== Individuals ===
- 2015 NORCECA Championship "Best Opposite"
