= Jennifer Álvarez =

Cuban volleyball player

Personal information
- Full name: Jennifer Yanet Álvarez Hernández
- Born: 19 November 1993 (age 32); Cienfuegos, Cuba
- Height: 184 cm (6 ft 0 in)
- Weight: 72 kg (159 lb)
- Spike: 310 cm (122 in)
- Block: 294 cm (116 in)

Volleyball information
- Current club: CS Volei Alba-Blaj
- Number: 19

Career
Years	Teams
2014	Cienfuegos

National team
Cuba

Jennifer Álvarez (born 19 November 1993, in Cienfuegos) is a Cuban volleyball player. She is a member of the Cuba women's national volleyball team and played for Cienfuegos in 2014.

She was part of the Cuban national team at the 2010 FIVB Volleyball Women's World Championship in Japan and the 2014 FIVB Volleyball Women's World Championship in Italy.

== Career ==
Álvarez signed with the Romanian club CS Volei Alba-Blaj for the 2017/18 season.

== Clubs ==
- (Cuba) Cienfuegos (2014)
- (Romania) CS Volei Alba-Blaj (2017–2018)
