= Lizbeth Sainz =

Mexican volleyball player

Personal information
- Nationality: Mexico
- Born: 14 December 1995 (age 30)
- Height: 1.74 m (5 ft 9 in)
- Weight: 55 kg (121 lb)
- Spike: 295 cm (116 in)
- Block: 285 cm (112 in)

Volleyball information
- Number: 10

Career
- Years: Team
- 2014: (Mexico) Baja California

Lizbeth Sainz (born 14 December 1995) is a Mexican female volleyball player. She is a member of the Mexico women's national volleyball team and played for Baja California in 2014.

She was part of the Mexico national team at the 2014 FIVB Volleyball Women's World Championship in Italy.

== Achievements ==
Throughout her career, Seomara has achieved significant recognition:

- She was named Best Scorer and Best Outside Hitter during the Women's Campeonato Universitario in the 2019/20 season.
- She earned the Best Receiver award at the 2019 NORCECA Challenger Cup Qualification.
- Earlier in her career, she was honored as Best Receiver at the 2013 Women's U21 World Championships and MVP of the Mexican League during the 2013/14 season.

These accolades reflect her exceptional performance across 38 tournaments and 30 matches.

== Clubs ==
- (Mexico) Baja California (2014)
