= Andrea Rangel =

Mexican volleyball player

Personal information
- Nationality: Mexican
- Born: 19 May 1993 (age 33)
- Height: 1.80 m (5 ft 11 in)
- Weight: 57 kg (126 lb)
- Spike: 297 cm (117 in)
- Block: 289 cm (114 in)

Volleyball information
- Number: 5

Career
- Years: Team
- 2014 2016: Nuevo León

National team
- Years: Team
- –: Mexico

Andrea Rangel (born 19 May 1993) is a Mexican female volleyball player. She is a member of the Mexico women's national volleyball team and played for Nuevo León in 2014.

She was the captain of the Mexico national team at the 2014 FIVB Volleyball Women's World Championship in Italy.

== Clubs ==
- (Mexico) Nuevo León (2014)
- Puerto Rico (2019)
- (Russia) Dinamo Metar (2021)
- Puerto Rico (2023–2026)

== Awards ==
=== Individuals ===
- 2015 NORCECA Championship "Best outside hitter"
- 2015 NORCECA Championship "Best scorer"
