= Debora Seilhamer =

Puerto Rican volleyball player (born 1985)

Personal information
- Nationality: Puerto Rican
- Born: October 4, 1985 (age 41); Ponce, Puerto Rico

Volleyball information
- Position: Libero
Medal record
Women's volleyball
Representing Puerto Rico
Central American and Caribbean Games
Silver medal – second place	2010 Mayagüez	Team
Pan-American Cup
Bronze medal – third place	2009 Miami	Team

Debora Seilhamer (born October 4, 1985) is a volleyball player from Ponce, Puerto Rico. Seilhamer made her debut with the Puerto Rico women's national volleyball team at the 2007 Pan American Games in Rio de Janeiro, Brazil. She was named Best Digger at the 2007 NORCECA Championship, where her team ended up in fifth place. Seilhamer played as a libero for the Women's National Team at the 2008 Olympic Qualification Tournament in Japan. There the team ended up in eighth and last place, having received a wild card for the event after Peru and Kenya withdrew. At the 2010 Central American and Caribbean Games, Seilhamer was named Best Digger, Best Libero and MVP of the Tournament. Puerto Rico lost to the Dominican Republic in the gold medal game.

Seilhamer was a two-time second-team AVCA All-American at the University of Southern California (USC). In 2003, she helped the Women of Troy go undefeated and win the NCAA Division I national title.

She obtained her Juris Doctor at the Pontifical Catholic University of Puerto Rico, School of Law and practices law. She is the daughter of a Puerto Rican politician Larry Seilhamer Rodríguez.

== Clubs ==
- (Puerto Rico) Indias de Mayagüez (2010–2011)
- (Puerto Rico) Lancheras de Cataño (2012–present)

== Awards ==
=== Individuals ===
- 2007 NORCECA Championship "Best Digger"
- 2007 Pan-American Games "Best Defender"
- 2010 Central American and Caribbean Games "Most Valuable Player"
- 2010 Central American and Caribbean Games "Best Digger"
- 2010 Central American and Caribbean Games "Best Receiver"
- 2010 Central American and Caribbean Games "Best Libero"
