= Jaimie Thibeault =

Canadian volleyball player (born 1989)

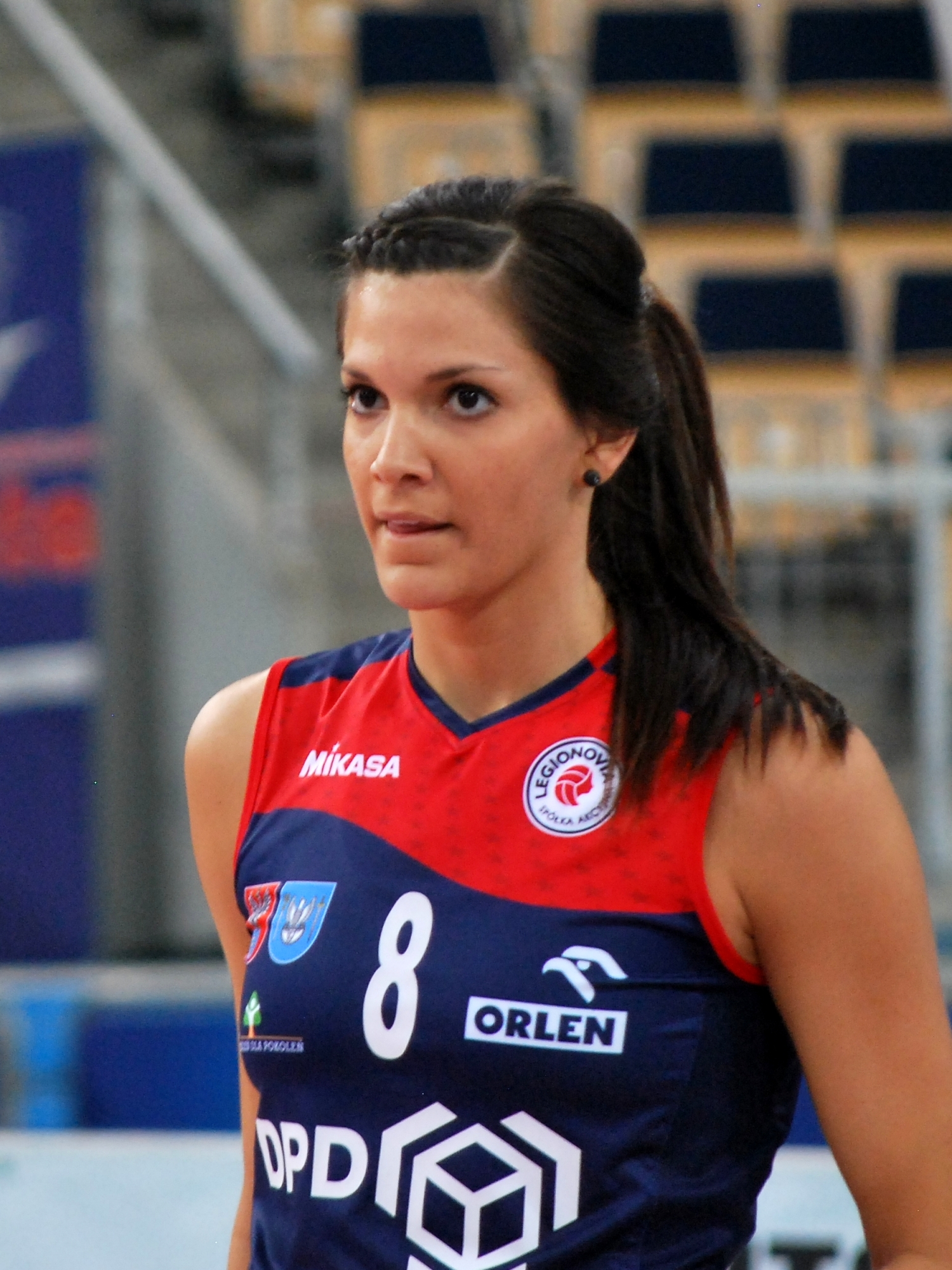

Personal information
- Nationality: Canada
- Born: 23 September 1989 (age 37)
- Hometown: Red Deer, Alberta
- Height: 1.88 m (6 ft 2 in)
- Spike: 302 cm (119 in)
- Block: 286 cm (113 in)

Jaimie Thibeault (born 23 September 1989) is a Canadian volleyball player. She is a member of the Canada women's national volleyball team.

She was part of the Canadian national team at the 2014 FIVB Volleyball Women's World Championship in Italy, and the 2015 FIVB Volleyball World Grand Prix.

She played for University of Montana, and in 2017 Jakarta BNI.

== Clubs ==
Club	From	To
United States University of Montana	2007-2008	2011-2012
France ES Le Cannet	2012-2013	2012-2013
Italy Robur Tiboni Volley Urbino	2013-2014	2013-2014
Poland LTS Legionovia Legionowo	2014-2015	2014-2015
Italy Futura Volley Busto Arsizio	2015-2016	2015-2016
Indonesia Jakarta BNI 46	January 2017	present
