= Valencianas de Juncos =

Volleyball team of Juncos, Puerto Rico

- Full name: Valencianas de Juncos
- Founded: 2004
- Ground: Coliseo Rafael G. Amalbert; Juncos, Puerto Rico
- Chairman: (Puerto Rico) Ernesto Camacho
- Head Coach: (Puerto Rico) Xiomara Molero
- League: LVSF
- 2007: 1st. place

The Valencianas de Juncos is the professional female volleyball team of Juncos, Puerto Rico.

== History ==
The team was found in 2004.

== Current volleyball squad ==
As of February 2011

- Head Coach: (Puerto Rico) Xiomara Molero
- Assistant coach: (Puerto Rico) Victor Vásquez

Number	Player	Position
1	(Puerto Rico) Carol Rodríguez	Opposite
2	(Puerto Rico) Stephanie Perez	Wing Spiker
3	(Puerto Rico) Vilmarie Mojica	Setter
4	(United States) Paige Tapp	Middle Blocker
5	(Puerto Rico) Janice Ortiz	Wing Spiker
6	(Puerto Rico) Yarimar Rosa	Wing Spiker
7	(Puerto Rico) Millianette Mojica	Wing Spiker
8	(Puerto Rico) [[]]	Setter
10	(United States) Mekana Barnes	Middle Blocker
11	(Puerto Rico) Sheila Ocasio	Middle Blocker
12	(Puerto Rico) Jenselyn Morales	Opposite Hitter
13	(Puerto Rico) Yahaira Ortiz	Middle Blocker
14	(Puerto Rico) Rayma Robles	Middle Blocker
15	(Puerto Rico) Melanie Perez	Libero
16	(United States) Julie Rubenstein	Wing Spiker
19	(Puerto Rico) Paulina Prieto Cerame	Opposite Hitter

== Release or Transfer ==
Number	Player	Position
10	(United States) Sarah Kirkwood	Wing Spiker
13	(United States) Jane Collymore	Wing Spiker
14	(Puerto Rico) Griselle López	Libero
15	(United States) Victoria Brown	Middle Blocker
16	(United States) Ellen Herman	Wing Spiker

== Palmares ==
=== League Championship ===
2007
