= Alena Rojas =

Cuban volleyball player (born 1992)

Personal information
- Full name: Alena Rojas Orta
- Nationality: Cuban
- Born: 9 August 1992 (age 34)
- Height: 1.86 m (6 ft 1 in)
- Weight: 76 kg (168 lb)
- Spike: 320 cm (126 in)
- Block: 305 cm (120 in)

Volleyball information

Career
- Years: Team
- 2010-2014: Santiago De Cuba
- 2014-2015: (Cuba) La Habana
- 2018-: (Russia) Tulitsa

National team
- Years: Team
- 2010-2016: Cuba
Honours
Women's volleyball
Representing Cuba
Pan American Games
Silver medal – second place	2011 Guadalajara	Team

Alena Rojas Orta (born 9 August 1992) is a Cuban volleyball player. She is a member of the Cuba women's national volleyball team.

She was part of the Cuban national team at the 2014 FIVB Volleyball Women's World Championship in Italy. She played for La Habana in 2014.

== Clubs ==
- Santiago De Cuba (2010–2014)
- (Cuba) La Habana (2014–2015)
- (Russia) Tulitsa (since 2018)
