= Lucille Charuk =

Canadian volleyball player

Personal information
- Nationality: Canadian
- Born: 13 August 1989 (age 37)
- Hometown: Tsawwassen, British Columbia
- Height: 1.88 m (6 ft 2 in)
- Spike: 320 cm (130 in)
- Block: 245 cm (96 in)
- Education: University of Houston

Volleyball information
- Position: Middle blocker

Career
Years	Teams
2007–2011; 2011–2013; 2013–2014; 2014–2015; 2015–2016; 2016–2017; 2018–2023	Houston Cougars; ŽOK Split; Calcit Volley; VT Hamburg; Rote Raben Vilsbiburg; CSM București; Calcit Volley

National team
2011–	Canada

Lucille "Lucy" Charuk (born 13 August 1989) is a Canadian volleyball player. She was part of the Canadian national team at the 2014 FIVB Volleyball Women's World Championship in Italy.

Charuk attended the University of Houston.
