= Stephanie Enright =

Puerto Rican volleyball player (born 1990)

Personal information
- Nickname: Fefa
- Nationality: Puerto Rican
- Born: December 15, 1990 (age 35); Ventura, California
- Height: 1.79 m (5 ft 10 in)
- Weight: 56 kg (123 lb)
- Spike: 300 cm (118 in)
- Block: 292 cm (115 in)

Volleyball information
- Position: Wing spiker
- Current club: AGIL Novara
- Number: 7

Career
Years	Teams
2009–2012	Criollas de Caguas
2012–2013	Toray Arrows
2014–2015	Criollas de Caguas
2015–2016	Azerrail Baku
2016	Criollas de Caguas
2016–2017	Il Bisonte Firenze
2017–2018	AGIL Novara

National team
2009–	Puerto Rico

Stephanie Enright (born December 15, 1990), nicknamed Fefa, is a Puerto Rican volleyball player who currently plays for Italian club AGIL Novara of the Serie A1. She is the cousin of Michael Nieves. She is a member of the Puerto Rico women's national volleyball team since 2009. Enright made her debut with the national team at the 2009 Women's NORCECA Volleyball Championship that was held in Bayamón, Puerto Rico. She was part of the Puerto Rican national team at the 2014 FIVB Volleyball Women's World Championship in Italy and at the 2016 Olympic Games in Rio de Janeiro.

== Clubs ==
- (Japan) Toray Arrows (2012–2013)
- (Puerto Rico) Criollas de Caguas (2014–2016)
- (Azerbaijan) Azerrail Baku (2015–2016)
- (Italy) Il Bisonte Firenze (2016–2017)
- (Italy) Novara (2018 - 2020)
- (Turkey) Türk Hava Yolları (2019-2020)
- Puerto Rico (2021)

== Awards ==
=== Club ===
- 2015–2016 Azerbaijan Super League – Champion, with Azerrail Baku
