= Indias de Mayagüez =

Female volleyball team of Mayagüez, Puerto Rico

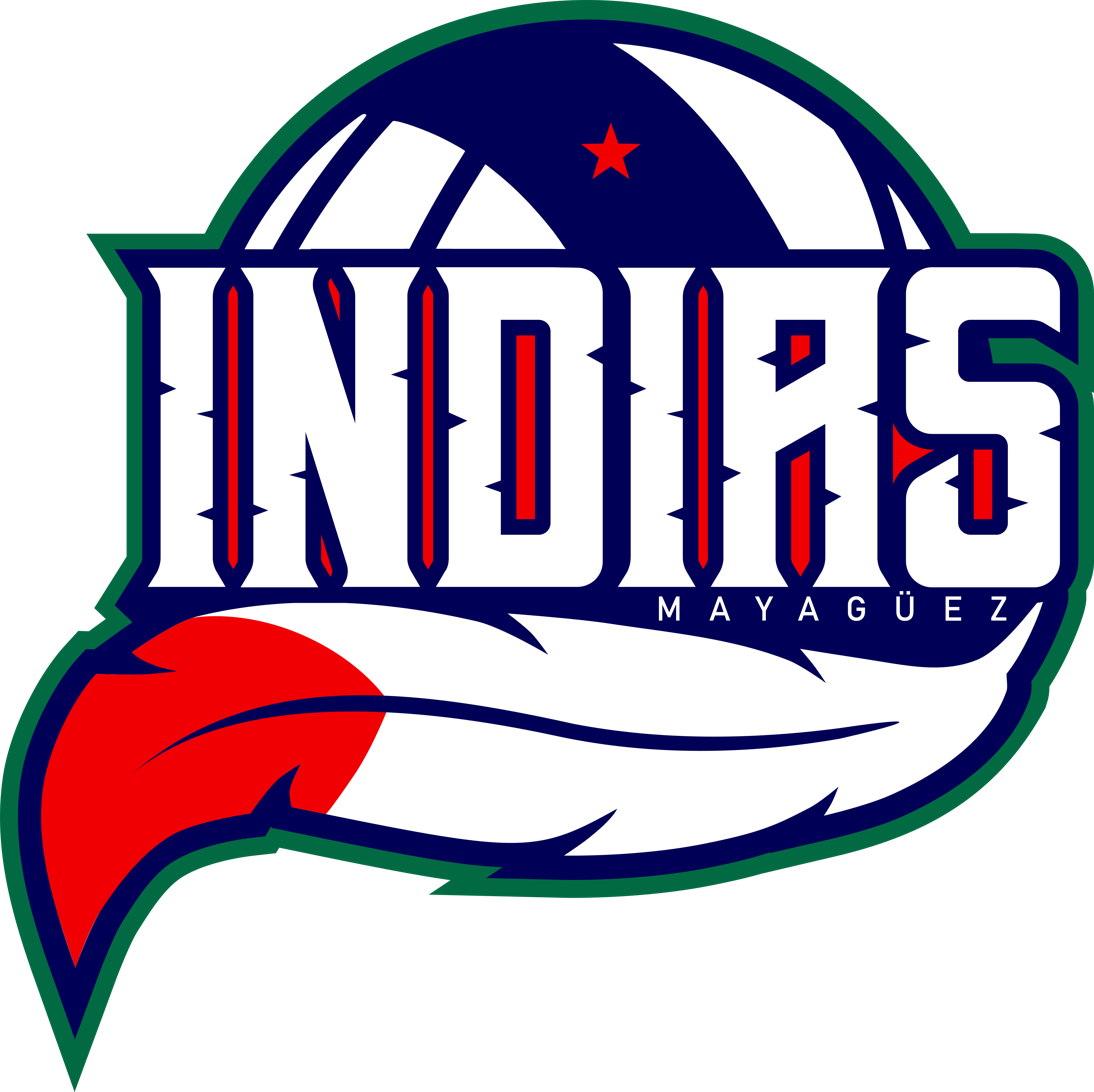
- Logo oficial de las Indias de Mayagüez
- Full name: Indias de Mayagüez
- Short name: Indias
- Nickname: La Tribu
- Founded: 1998
- Ground: Palacio de Recreación y Deportes; Mayagüez, Puerto Rico (Capacity: 5500)
- Chairman: Marvin Alameda
- Manager: Eduardo Rodés
- League: LVSF
- 2018: 3rd
- Championships: 2013

Uniforms
Home	Away

Indias de Mayagüez is the Professional Female volleyball (LVSF) team of Mayagüez, Puerto Rico. The team's home court is the Palacio de Recreación y Deportes.

== History ==
The Team was organized in 1998, and the Puerto Rican Volleyball Federation approved the LVSF Franchise in 1999. The team's first season was in 2000. The team has consistently reached the playoffs and the semi-finals of the LVSF. The team's colors are green and white for the home uniform and white and green for the visiting uniform. The home court is at the Palacio de Recreación y Deportes in Mayagüez, Puerto Rico. The Indias de Mayagüez won the LVSF Championship in 2013.

== Squads ==
=== Current ===
As of April 2016

- Head Coach: José Mieles
- Assistant coach: Gerardo Batista

Number	Player	Position
2	Kathia Sánchez	Setter
2	Raymariely Santos	Setter
4	Nomaris Vélez	Libero
5	Sarai Álvarez	Opposite
3	Gabriela Colón	Wing Spiker
12	Amanda Vázquez	Middle Blocker
11	Jennifer Quesada	Middle Blocker
18	Shannon Torregrosa	Wing Spiker
