= Pinkin de Corozal =

Volleyball team of Corozal, Puerto Rico

- Full name: Pinkin de Corozal
- Short name: Pinkin
- Nickname: Scissors
- Founded: 1968
- Ground: Carmen Z. Figueroa Coliseum; Corozal, Puerto Rico (Capacity: 3,000)
- Chairman: (Puerto Rico) Lilibeth Rojas
- Manager: (Puerto Rico) Angel Perez
- Captain: (Puerto Rico) Génesis Castillo
- League: LVSF
- 2023: Champion

Pinkin de Corozal is the professional female volleyball team of Corozal, Puerto Rico. The name "Pinkin" refers to pinking shears, a type of scissors that are used to cut fabric in a zig-zag pattern.

== History ==
=== Early years ===
The name was coined by professor Nidia Rivera de Burgos and makes reference to the pinking shears used in sewing. The original lineup of the Pinkin first came together to play in the 13-14 youth leagues, with a lineup of players that were born in Corozal and were coached by Juan García Cosme. Afterwards, the team ascended to First Category. The Pinkin won a mixed tournament that included schools within the Puerto Rico Public Education System. In 1962, the Pinkin were promoted to the First Class (second in the Puerto Rico Volleyball Federation's league pyramid) where they won seven consecutive championships. Their captain was Carmen Zoraida Figueroa, who was selected the “Best Volleyball Player” by the COPUR in 1967 and 1969. In 1968, the COPUR awarded the “Best Volleyball Player” recognition to Gabriela Suárez. García was recognized as the “Sportsman of the Year” by the COPUR. During this timeframe, the Pinkin frequently played against the Aruba volleyball national team, whom they defeated in consecutive matches.

In June 1968, the Puerto Rico Volleyball Federation announced that several teams, including the Pinkin, had registered for the First Category tournament and that division assignment was pending. Corozal opened the tournament with an four-game undefeated streak by picking victories over teams including the Lorsonettes and the Dolls, leading the North Section. Figueroa led the league in scoring early on. Entering the last week of July, the Pinkin continued undefeated after winning a double header over division rivals. With the team, Graciela Suárez was able to briefly displace Figueroa as leading scorer.

In August, the Pinkin began their participation in the final round-robin series by facing the Lorsonettes. After Yauco was retired from the series due to their players suffering injuries in an automobile accident, Ponce was selected as a replacement and games against Corozal were scheduled in its place. On August 11, 1968, the Lorsonettes defeated the Pinkin in two sets, 15-9 and 15–5, to end their undefeated streak. The team res covered by winning three consecutive games in a weekend, defeating Ponce and Isabela in two sets and winning a rematch against the Lorsonettes in three. After losing im two sets to Isabela, the Pinkin clinched the title with a two set win over Ponce, finishing the series with a record of 7-2 and their fifth consecutive championship. Receiving the trophies on a subsequent date, the team returned to action in November 1968 by traveling to Willemstad, Curaçao to face a local team in a three-game friendly series.

Figueroa received a trophy for Player of the Year, while Juan García Cosme was recognized as Coach of the Year and Owner of the Year. The Corozal chapter of the Lions Club gave medals to each player and the coach as well. Graciela Suárez represented the Pinkin at the COPUR's Olympic dinner. In February 1969, the Dolls defeated Corozal in three sets, ending the Pinkin's undefeated streak. With Figueroa and Cortés among the league's offensive leaders, the Pinkin were dominating at home, while Caguas at the tournament's lead. Figueroa set a single-game record with 33 points by Figueroa in a win over Manatí-Bayamón. Corozal was able to hold off to the lead over the Caguas-Lorsonettes and Dolls, both tied one game behind. On March 1, 1969, Corozal faced the last-place Guayama. By defeating the Lorsonettes in five sets, the team clinched the first place. Corozal closed the season by facing the Yauco Girls in a game to avoid a draw in the top position with the Dolls. The points leadership was to be decided between Figueroa and Iris Rodríguez. By securing another win, the Pinkin finished the season with a single loss (to the Dolls).

In the semifinals, Corozal was paired with the Manatí-Bayamón Atenienses in a Series A that was postponed by rain. Led by Figueroa's offensive, the team opened with two consecutive wins. With another win, Corozal advanced to the final, where they faced the Dolls. Corozal won the first game in four sets, 14–16, 15–6, 16-14 and 15–11 with 18 points by Figueroa. The Pinkin also won the second in five sets.

=== Promotion to Superior Category ===
For the 1969 season, the team was promoted from Primera Categoría to Categoría Superior and their home court was overhauled by the Administración de Parques and the municipality. In the finals, the Pinkin were paired with the Bayamón Dolls, defeating them to open the series. In the second game, team won a four-set game. Zoraida Figueroa (24) and Graciela Suarez (15) led the team in the last game, held at the Cancha Pepín Cestero. On April 11, 1969, the Pinkin travelled abroad to compete in an international series held at Aruba. They faced the Aruban champion club Rapid, 2nd place La Fama and the Jolly Girls. Zoraida Figueroa was elected MVP. The team received a congratulations from the Puerto Rico House of Representatives for their title. The Pinkin defeated the Rapid with sets of 16–14, 7–15, 15–13, 9-15 and 15-8 and La Fama (15–4, 15–5, 13-15 and 15–10), before besting the Jolly Girls in four sets (9–15, 15–8, 15-6 and 15–8) to win the series undefeated, the first time for a team from the Puerto Rican league. For their accomplishments during this year, the Club Recreativo Howard T. Jason organized an activity where the fans honored the team. In May 1969, Pinkin hosted the Los Angeles Windjammers at Corozal. On May 25, 1969, the team played an exhibition game against the Puerto Rico national team pre-selection. In July, the municipal of Corozal sanctioned an event named Día de los Deportes, in which the Pinkin once again played against La Fama. Prior to this, the team played against Isabela and a team composed of players from the North region. Led by Figueroa, Corozal swept La Fama in three games, during which they didn't lose a single set. During the offseason, owners Ángel Pérez joined Club Howard T. Jason in promoting a youth tournament named “Futuras Pinkin” to scout for talent.

On September 26, 1969, Corozal opened the season by defeating the Dolls. Afterwards, Corozal visited Manatí and visited Guayama. A game against the Lorsonettes had to be postponed due to rain and Corozal received Manatí continuing its winning streak. After defating Caguas in five sets as part of a rescheduled game, the Pinkin received the visit of the Cafeteras de Yauco. The Pinkin then faced the Dolls in back to back games, including a game that was played as part of the municipality's Fiestas Patronales. Resuming their regular participation, the Pinkin visited the Atenienses, losing their first game of the season in three sets (11–15, 10-15 and 3–15) in a game where Figueroa only scored four points. The defeat also meant the end of a 28-game winning streak for the team and allowed Manatí to take over the top spot of the standings. The Pinkin faced the Atenienses in a rescheduled game for the leadership. After returning to the top, the Pinkin picked another win over the Cafeteras (15–4, 15-3 and 15–9). Corozal defeated Manatí in the final game of the regular season to finish on top with a record of 8–1, while Figueroa finished as the top scorer with 120 points. The team was paired with the fourth-place Cafeteras in Semifinal A, winning it to advance. in the final series Corozal won the first game, but Manatí tied the series in a home match. The Pinkin won in five sets to take a lead at their home court, but the Atenienses won the fourth in four sets to tie the series. Led by 22 points by Figueroa and 19 by Graciela Suárez in a decisive game, Corozal defeated Manatí in four sets as visitor to claim the title. On January 23, 1970, Ángel Pérez wrote to federative president José Nicolás Palmer that he was surrendering the franchise in protest of the method used to select the MVP and other concerns. The franchise was acquired by Juan Rosado within months, with Juan García Cosme as coach.

=== Forced restructuration ===
However, Corozal lost Zoraida Figueroa in an aviation accident, leaving Graciela Suárez as its main player. The Pinkin opened the next season against Manatí on February 19, 1971. Corozal quickly gathered another winning streak, climbing the top of the standings with a record of 7–0. On March 26, 1971, the Pinkin faced the other undefeated team left in the league, the Dolls, who managed to defeat them in five sets to climb to the top of the rankings. The Pinkin went on another winning streak, climbing to the top of the standings despite not defeating the Dolls due to having more victories. Both teams faced each other, with Corozal retaining the leadership. Despite briefly losing their coach, the Pinkin defeated Río Piedras to solidify their position under Abraham Ramírez. In the final game of the regular season, the team faced the Dolls, who won in four sets, leaving the standings tied with both at 12–2. A tiebreaker game was then held as a visitor at Manatí, which Corozal won in four sets. The team was paired with fourth place Yauco in Semifinal A. The Pinkin won the first game in four sets, but the Girls tied the series in five sets. Corozal won a tie breaker and the decisive game to advance to win Semifinal A and advance. In the finals, the Pinkin faced the Dolls, winning the first two games, both in five sets. The Dolls won their first game of the series in five sets as part of a game held at Casa de España, following this with wins in five and four sets to take the lead. Corozal managed a comeback, tying the series by winning in three sets and then winning the decisive game in four sets, with both matches being held at their home court. The team was once again honored by the citizens of the town at the Club Howard T. Jason. On July 31, 1971, the Pinkin played an exhibition game against the Puerto Rico national team, losing in five sets.

Led by young figures such as Enid Marrero and Pilar Vázquez during the 1972 season, the Pinkin opened the season on a three-game undefeated streak. They finished among the four first teams in the standings and advanced to the semifinal series. Paired with the Dolls and Yauco Girls, Corozal gained a quick lead in the series by winning the first two games. With a win over Guayanilla in five sets, the team advanced to the final. The Dolls defeated the Pinkin to open the series in five sets, despite winning the initial two. The team responded by winning the second in four sets, tying the series. Afterwards, Corozal took the lead with consecutive wins. The Dolls kept the best of seven series going with back to back wins in their home court of Summit Hills. The Pinkin won the decisive game in five sets to win their fourth straight consecutive title.

=== Perennial champions ===
Pilar Vázquez was the postseason's best scorer, with an average of 17.8 points per game, and she was chosen the league's Most Valuable Player, Best Scorer and Rookie of the Year. Afterwards, the club received its annual homage from Club Howard T. Jason and the local populace. During the summer, the Pinkin travelled to Aruba to participate in another club series. On March 23, 1973, Corozal participated in the first league carnival along Yauco, Guyanilla, Ponce, Round Hills and the Dolls. The Pinkin advanced among the league's top teams and won its semifinals. Despite losing the first game of the series to Guayanilla in five sets, Corozal made a comeback and won three consecutive games. The Pinkin managed to win the series, for its fifth consecutive title with Vázquez, Rosita Rivera and Yvette Figueroa making the national team after the tournament was over. Sonia Padilla was recognized by the volleyball federation as the Most Disciplined Player.

On July 13, 1974, the Pinkin began the 1974 season by defeating the Round Hill Dolphins in three sets (17–5, 15-7 and 15–8). Corozal climbed to the top of the standings with a win over the Metropolitanas. The team widened this lead with a winning streak in which they defeated Ensenada, the Dolphins and Metropolitanas. Advancing to the tournament finals by clinching the North Section, the Pinkin opened the series with a three-set win over Guayanilla (15–10, 15-11 and 15–11). The team won the second, but lost the third. Corozal won the best of seven series in five games, winning the decisive gane in five sets (11–15, 15–13, 8–15, 15-13 and 15–9) with 31 points by Vázquez.

The franchise was acquired by Rafael Marrero. Corozal opened the 1975 season with consecutive wins over Ensenada (15–9, 15-2 and 15–2) and Round Hill (16–14, 15-8 and 15–9). The team retained the top position and gathered a record of 10-4 during the following month, followed closely by the Guayanilla Voli-Girlswith 8–5. After finishing the regular season in the first place, the team received a semifinal bye. The Pinkin faced the Voli-Girls in the final, which was delayed due to the weather conditions, winning the first game in three sets (15–9, 15-4 and 15–3). Corozal won the second in four sets and the third in five sets. In the decisive match, the Pinkin defeated the Voli-Girls in five sets (15–8, 6–15, 15-11 and 15–6) led by 28 points by Vázquez. At the Fiestas Patronales of Corozal, the team participated in a single elimination tournament along the Dolphins and Metropolitanas.

In 1976, the Pinkin once again finished first during the regular season and waited for the second and third teams to determine the other finalist. Led by Vázquez and Ivette Figueroa, the Pinkin won the 1977 league championship by defeating the Voli-Girls in the final. Ivette Figueroa was selected the Most Valuable Player. Rosita Rivera served as team captain. The Pinkin and Guayanilla opened the 1978 season at Corozal. They were considered the tournament's favorite, however, during this season the Metropolitanas gathered a winning streak that placed them on top, including victories over both the champion and runner-up. In the semifinal, Corozal was paired against Guayanilla, winning in four sets (10–5, 15–6, 15-2 and 15–11) and three sets (19–15, 15-7 and 26–15). In the final, the Metropolitanas won the opener in three sets (3–15, 13-25 and 3–14). The decisive game was held at Corozal, with Guaynabo winning in three sets (8–15, 3-15 and 12–15) to win its first franchise title.

Coached by Abraham Ramírez and led by Martiza Rodríguez, Pilar Vázquez and Ivonne Solla, Corozal opened the 1980 season on an eleven-game winning streak. In July, the Pinkin participated in an exhibition match against the visiting University of San Diego team. The team completed the season by imposing a new record for consecutive wins with 15–0. The team opened its semifinals with a three-set win over the Criollas de Caguas (18–4, 15-11 and 15–7) and advanced. In the final, San Juan earned a 3–2 series led by defeating Corozal in four sets (5–15, 15–9, 15-5 and 15–11). The Pinkin forced a decisive game at home by winning their next match, winning the league championship. Vázquez was selected the Most Valuable Player, Ivonne Solla Best Setter, Wanda Cortés Most Improved and Ramírez was the Coach of the Year. In October 1980, the Pinkin travelled to the Dominican Republic to play against Club Tamboril de Santiago. Pilar Vázquez was both the Most Valuable Player and the Top Scorer.

Despite losing Ivette Figueroa, Rosita Fivera and Eneida Cruz prior to the 1981, the team was considered the favorite to repeat. They opened the season with a four set win over the debuting Colegio de Ingenieros (11–15, 15–12, 15-5 and 15–6) to start another winning streak. They played their first home game by receiving the visit of San Juan. In the semifinals, the Pinkin swept the Criollas de Caguas in three games. Corozal met San Juan in the final, with Vázquez scoring 18 points to open the series with a four-set victory (15–4, 13–15, 15-2 and 15–8).

=== End of dominance ===
In the 1982 season, the Pinkin defeated Colegio de Ingenieros in a five-set game (15–8, 16–14, 13–15, 10-15 and 15–4) to win the four-game final series. Corozal began the 1985 season on a losing streak, during which they lost to the Chicas twice. Their first win came in three sets (15–6, 15-4 and 15–5) over the also winless Ponce and their first winning streak began with a win over the Criollas in three-sets (15–2, 16-14 and 15–10). After Corozal defeated Guaynabo (15–10, 15-5 and 15–5), Arecibo stopped the streak in four sets (12–15, 17–25, 15-5 and 15–4). The top-ranked Chicas won another encounter between both teams in four sets (15–6, 14–16, 16-14 and 15–5). With a record of 5-7 and facing possible elimination, the Pinkin played a reassigned game against the eliminated Ponce, winning and advancing to the semifinals. Corozal was paired with the Capitanas, with the series being competitive and advancing to a decisive game won by Arecibo in five sets (8–15, 10–15, 15–10, 15-10 and 15–10). This marked the first time in 18 years that the Pinkin did not advance to a final.

Coached by Jimmy Morales and still led by Pilar Vázquez, who now joined by rookie Joana Aquino, the Pinkin began the 1987 on a winning streak. The team gathered a 3–1 record to open in the second place of the standings. By defeating the Criollas de Caguas in four sets (15–10, 16-14 and 15–11), Corozal took over the top spot. Lilibeth Rojas was selected the season's Most Valuable Player and Best Setter. The Pinkin advanced to the semifinals, however, unlike previous years the Criollas were favored to advance over them. Corozal lost the first two games both in five sets by scores of 15–6, 10–15, 15–13, 11-15 and 15-1 and 15–13, 3–15, 15–10, 10-15 and 15–9. The Pinkin were eliminated in three sets (15–10, 15-6 and 15–11) in the decisive game. Coached by the 1987 season began, the Pinkin were considered more vulnerable within the league, despite still featuring Vázquez and Rojas, the return of María Ivette Figueroa and Sandra Pérez being a promising prospect. The team opened the season with a winning streak than included three-set (15–8, 15-10 and 15–11) wins over the Pitirres de Guaynabo and Chicas de San Juan (15–4, 15-8 and 15–6). The gathered a record of 4–4 to remain in the third place of the rankings, which defended by defeating the Chicas in five sets (8–15, 15–13, 15–6, 15-11 and 15–8) when they tied. A nagging knee injury kept Vázquez sidelined, while the Capitanas defeated the team. The Pinkin defeated the Pitirres in three sets (15–5, 15-13 and 16–14) to clinch the third place. The team concluded their participation in the season in the same place.

=== Struggles and changes ===
Vázquez retired prior to the 1988 season and the team promoted youth players Wilbia Bonilla and Grisel Rivera. The team opened the season with five consecutive losses. The first win for the Pinkins was in four sets (8–15, 15–9, 15-21 and 15–8) over the Metropolitanas. With another win in five sets (5–15, 15–13, 15–8, 10-15 and 17–15) over the Chicas, the team ascended to the fifth place of the standings. However, San Juan was able to fend off their bid for the fourth place. Halfway through the season, Juan Avilés left the role of coach due to differences with some players. The Pinkin were able to pick a victory over the previous year's runner up, the Criollas, in five sets (15–13, 12–15, 15–12, 9-15 and 15–1). Another win over the Capitanas in five sets (16–14, 9–15, 15–2, 12-5 and 15–7) kept them in contention. However, a three-set (15–10, 15-8 and 15–7) loss to the Leonas followed. With a final record of 6–9, this was the first time that the Pinkin were left out of the playoffs.

For the 1989 season, the Pinkin acquired Luz González and Regina Retes via free agency. Avilés returned to the role of coach. The team experienced a difficult season and allowed the Leonas to tie their single season win record with a four set (16–14, 8–15, 15-7 and 15–2) loss to them. With a record 7–11, the team still held the possibility of qualifying entering the final week. However, a five set (6–15, 15–10, 15–5, 8-15 and 15–9) loss to the Capitanas eliminated them. Prior to the 1990 season the Pinkin changed their coach and won a preparatory tournament held during the offseason.

== Squads ==
=== Current ===
Coach names current as of May 2023

- Head Coach: (Puerto Rico) Ángel Pérez
- Assistant Coach: (Puerto Rico) Freddie Vázquez
- Assistant Coach: (Puerto Rico)
- Physical Trainer: (Puerto Rico) Gabriel Gordillo

Number	Player	Position
12	(United States) Tori Dilfer	Setter
14	(Puerto Rico) Andrea Serra	Wing Spiker
9	(Puerto Rico) Karelys Otero	Libero
13	(Puerto Rico) Nori Ceballo	Opposite
4	(Puerto Rico) Jennymar Santiago	Setter
10	(United States) Ronika Stone	Middle Blocker
17	(Puerto Rico) Génesis Castillo (C)	Middle Blocker
3	(Puerto Rico) Alexandra Rivera	Libero
15	(Puerto Rico) Ivania Ortiz	Wing Spiker
18	(United States) Adanna Rollins	Wing Spiker
11	(Puerto Rico) Brittany Abercrombie	Opposite
5	(Puerto Rico) Adriana Rodríguez	Middle Blocker
6	(Puerto Rico) Alexis González	Setter
16	(Puerto Rico) Paola Santiago	Wing Spiker/Opposite
Reserve	(Puerto Rico) Daly Santana	Wing Spiker

== Palmares ==
=== League Championship ===
A total of 19 championships, the most in LVSF history. These are:

1968, 1969, 1970, 1971, 1972, 1973, 1974, 1975, 1977, 1979, 1980, 1981, 1982, 1983, 1984, 2008, 2010, 2022, 2023
