= Mets de Guaynabo (women's volleyball) =

Volleyball team of Guaynabo, Puerto Rico

- Full name: Mets de Guaynabo
- Short name: Mets
- Founded: 1970
- Ground: Mario Morales Coliseum; Guaynabo, Puerto Rico (Capacity: 5500)
- Chairman: (Puerto Rico) Jorge De Jesús
- Manager: (Puerto Rico) Javier Gaspar
- Captain: (Puerto Rico) Eva Cruz
- League: LVSF
- 2001: 1st. Runner-Up

Uniforms
Home	Away

Mets de Guaynabo is the professional female volleyball team of Guaynabo, Puerto Rico.

== History ==
Mets de Guaynabo was established in 1970. They won three Liga de Voleibol Superior Femenino titles in 1978, 1993–94 and 1995, before they were known as Conquistadoras de Guaynabo between 1996 and 2004. In 2006, the club regained its original name Mets de Guaynabo. They competed until 2014, before they returned to the championship in 2023–24.

== Honors ==
- Liga de Voleibol Superior Femenino: 1978, 1993–94, 1995

== Squads ==
=== Current ===
As of April 2011

- Head coach: (Puerto Rico) Javier Gaspar
- Assistant coach: (Puerto Rico) Renato González

Number	Player	Position
1	(Puerto Rico) Nayka Benitez	Libero
2	(Puerto Rico) Jordalys Mercado	Setter
3	(Puerto Rico) Winna Pellot	Libero
4	(United States) Jessica Swarbrick	Middle Blocker
6	(Puerto Rico) Miriam Quijano	Middle Blocker
7	(Puerto Rico) Sheila López	Opposite
8	(Puerto Rico) Eva Cruz	Wing Spiker/Opposite
9	(Cuba) Dulce Téllez	Middle Blocker
11	(Puerto Rico) Enimarie Fernández	Middle Blocker/Opposite
12	(Puerto Rico) Mariemil Del Valle	Libero
14	(Dominican Republic) Prisilla Rivera	Wing Spiker
15	(United States) Jessica Nyrop	Setter
17	(Puerto Rico) Claudia Rodríguez Bertrán	Libero
18	(Brazil) Juliana Paz	Wing Spiker

=== Release or Transfer ===
Number	Player	Position
5	(United States) Patrice Arrington	Wing Spiker
10	(Puerto Rico) Aida Bauza	Wing Spiker
