= Criollas de Caguas =

Puerto Rican women's professional volleyball team based in Caguas, Puerto Rico

- Full name: Criollas de Caguas
- Short name: Criollas
- Founded: 1980; 46 years ago
- Ground: Coliseo Héctor Solá Bezares; Caguas, Puerto Rico (Capacity: 10,000)
- Owner: Francisco Ramos
- Manager: Juan Carlos Nuñez
- Captain: Karina Ocasio
- League: Liga de Voleibol Superior Femenino
- 2021: Champion
- Website: Club home page

Criollas de Caguas is a Puerto Rican women's professional volleyball team founded in 1980. The team is based in Caguas, Puerto Rico.

== History ==
The team was founded in 1980.

== Team ==
=== 2022 ===
Head coach:	(Puerto Rico)

Number	Player	Position	Height	Birth date
1	(United States) Annie Drews	Outside hitter	6 ft 4 in (1.93 m)	December 25, 1993 (age 32)
2	(Puerto Rico) Shara Venegas	Libero	5 ft 8 in (1.73 m)	September 18, 1992 (age 34)
3	(Puerto Rico) Fabiola Toro			
4	(United States) Stephanie Niemer	Outside hitter	6 ft 1 in (1.85 m)	September 3, 1989 (age 37)
6	(Puerto Rico) Stephanie Enright		5 ft 10 in (1.78 m)	December 15, 1990 (age 35)
7	(Puerto Rico) Génesis Collazo	Middle blocker	6 ft 1 in (1.85 m)	October 4, 1992 (age 34)
9	(Puerto Rico) Jennifer Nogueras		6 ft 1 in (1.85 m)	August 1, 1991 (age 35)
11	(Puerto Rico) Karina Ocasio (c)	Opposite hitter	6 ft 4 in (1.93 m)	August 1, 1985 (age 41)
12	(Puerto Rico) Andrea de León	Setter		
13	(Venezuela) Shirley Florián	Opposite hitter	6 ft 3 in (1.91 m)	July 27, 1991 (age 35)
14	(Puerto Rico) Yeaneska Matos			
15	(Puerto Rico) Leira Ortiz			
16	(Puerto Rico) Ana Sofía Jusino		6 ft 2 in (1.88 m)	January 5, 1994 (age 32)
18	(Puerto Rico) Lynda Morales		6 ft 2 in (1.88 m)	May 20, 1988 (age 38)

== Honours ==
Liga de Voleibol Superior Femenino

- Champions (14) : 1996–1998, 2000–2002, 2005, 2011, 2014, 2015, 2016,

2017, 2019, 2021

== Notable players ==
- (United States) Micaya White
- (Dominican Republic) Annerys Vargas
- (Dominican Republic) Cosiri Rodríguez
- (United States) Jessica Jones
- (United States) Regan Hood
- (United States) Diane Copenhagen
