= 2011 Women's Pan-American Volleyball Cup squads =

This article shows all participating team squads at the 2011 Women's Pan-American Volleyball Cup, held from July 1 to 9, 2010 in Ciudad Juárez, Mexico.

== Argentina ==
- Head Coach: Horacio Bastit

#	Name	Date of birth	Height	Weight	Spike	Block
1	Lucía Gaido	19.01.1988	162	52	278	265
3	Yamila Nizetich	27.01.1989	183	76	305	295
5	Lucía Fresco	14.05.1991	193	98	308	297
6	Daniela Gildenberger	12.06.1984	175	70	290	280
9	Camila Jersonsky	30.05.1991	181	68	305	289
10	Emilce Sosa	11.09.1987	177	65	307	282
11	Georgina Pinedo (c)	30.05.1981	175	65	305	295
12	Antonela Bortolozzi	22.01.1986	182	72	298	278
13	Leticia Boscacci	08.11.1985	184	70	304	294
14	Florencia Carlotto	14.10.1988	171	72	302	291
17	Antonela Curatola	23.10.1991	173	72	280	275
18	Yael Castiglione	27.09.1985	183	75	300	289

== Brazil ==
- Head Coach: José Roberto Guimarães

#	Name	Date of birth	Height	Weight	Spike	Block
1	Fabiana Claudino (c)	24.01.1985	193	76	314	293
2	Juciely Silva	18.12.1980	184	71	289	285
3	Danielle Lins	05.01.1985	181	68	290	276
4	Paula Pequeno	22.01.1982	184	74	302	285
6	Thaisa Menezes	15.05.1987	196	79	316	301
8	Suelle Oliveira	29.04.1987	187	72	291	278
9	Juliana Nogueira	04.08.1988	190	71	307	301
12	Natalia Pereira	24.04.1989	183	76	300	288
13	Sheilla Castro	01.07.1983	185	64	302	284
14	Fabiana de Oliveira	07.03.1980	169	59	276	266
16	Fernanda Rodrigues	10.05.1986	179	74	308	288
17	Fabiola de Souza	03.02.1983	184	70	300	285

== Canada ==
- Head Coach: Arnd Ludwig

#	Name	Date of birth	Height	Weight	Spike	Block
4	Tammy Mahon (c)	04.11.1980	180	76	298	282
6	Claire Hanna	27.04.1986	182	67	291	279
8	Carla Bradstock	11.08.1985	178	68	282	271
9	Sarah Pavan	16.08.1986	196	73	314	302
11	Nadine Alphonse	22.07.1983	186	74	312	302
12	Sherline Tasha Holness	11.02.1980	188	80	312	295
13	Marie-Pier Murray-Methot	23.03.1986	184	86	304	286
14	Elizabeth Cordonier	03.03.1987	183	75	304	285
16	Lucille Charuk	13.08.1989	188	84	315	296
17	Brittney Page	04.02.1984	184	67	305	287
18	Kyla Richey	20.06.1989	188	79	302	287
19	Lauren O'Reilly	04.04.1989	178	69	293	273

== Chile ==
- Head Coach: Hugo Jáuregui

#	Name	Date of birth	Height	Weight	Spike	Block
2	Isidora Santa María	11.03.1993	162	55	240	230
3	Magdalena Delano	05.07.1993	176	67	280	277
4	Carla Ruz	26.09.1991	162	58	275	268
5	Beatriz García	29.11.1993	176	59	255	272
7	Pilar Mardones	16.11.1989	174	58	280	272
8	Francisca Espejo (c)	06.10.1989	178	70	290	281
10	Chris Vorpahl	04.10.1990	180	63	295	283
11	Ignacia Cabrera	29.07.1987	180	68	296	283
12	Florencia Garrido	07.10.1988	177	68	294	284
13	Josefa Schuler	24.04.1995	180	65	290	280
15	Isidora Steinmettz	01.06.1994	180	68	280	275
16	Catalina Melo	03.01.1997	180	69	301	280

== Costa Rica ==
- Head Coach: Braulio Godínez

#	Name	Date of birth	Height	Weight	Spike	Block
1	Dionisia Thompson	09.06.1978	161	78	287	278
3	Viviana Murillo Chávez	06.02.1992	164	63	258	249
4	Johanna Gamboa	23.11.1987	180	70	280	275
5	Karen Cope	06.11.1985	173	55	313	287
6	Angela Willis	26.01.1977	188	67	305	292
7	Mariela Quesada	08.07.1987	177	70	290	280
9	Verania Willis (c)	23.09.1979	182	73	303	285
10	Paola Ramírez	23.02.1987	186	85	294	285
14	Irene Fonseca	10.10.1985	182	70	285	272
15	Marcela Araya	24.09.1992	167	52	268	254
16	Mijal Hines Cuza	15.12.1993	186	80	290	280
17	Amelia Arias	17.12.1991	164	58	276	258

== Cuba ==
- Head Coach: Juan Carlos Gala

#	Name	Date of birth	Height	Weight	Spike	Block
1	Wilma Salas	09.03.1991	188	60	313	298
2	Yanelis Santos	30.03.1986	183	71	315	312
3	Alena Rojas	09.08.1992	186	78	320	305
4	Yoana Palacios	06.10.1990	184	72	321	300
6	Daymara Lescay	05.09.1992	184	72	308	290
8	Emily Borrell	19.02.1992	167	55	270	260
10	Ana Cleger	27.11.1989	185	73	315	297
11	Leanny Castañeda	18.10.1986	188	70	325	320
13	Rosanna Giel	10.06.1992	187	62	320	315
14	Kenia Carcaces	22.01.1986	188	69	308	306
15	Yusidey Silié (c)	11.11.1984	183	80	316	300
18	Jennifer Álvarez	19.11.1993	184	72	310	294

== Dominican Republic ==
- Head Coach: Marcos Kwiek

#	Name	Date of birth	Height	Weight	Spike	Block
1	Annerys Vargas	07.08.1981	196	70	327	320
2	Dahiana Burgos	07.04.1985	180	70	305	312
3	Lisvel Elisa Eve	10.09.1991	194	70	325	315
5	Brenda Castillo	05.06.1992	167	55	220	270
7	Niverka Marte	19.10.1990	178	71	295	283
9	Sidarka Núñez	25.06.1984	185	62	330	320
10	Milagros Cabral (c)	17.10.1978	182	63	325	320
12	Karla Echenique	16.05.1986	180	62	300	290
13	Cindy Rondón	12.11.1988	183	61	312	305
14	Prisilla Rivera	29.12.1984	183	70	309	305
17	Gina Mambrú	21.01.1986	182	55	330	315
18	Bethania de la Cruz	13.05.1989	188	58	330	320

== Mexico ==
- Head Coach: Mario Herrera

#	Name	Date of birth	Height	Weight	Spike	Block
2	Alejandra Perales	11.08.1992	173	57	289	279
4	Gema León	11.03.1991	181	63	290	278
5	Grecia Rivera	08.06.1992	178	61	287	275
6	Karla Sainz	22.07.1993	184	75	298	285
8	Xitlali Herrera	02.01.1992	181	68	295	288
9	Andra Maldonado	08.09.1991	180	77	294	285
10	Martha Revuelta (c)	06.09.1986	178	76	292	281
14	Claudia Ríos	22.09.1992	180	68	282	264
15	Pamela Cheu	01.01.1988	170	80	282	263
16	Dulce Carranza	29.06.1990	178	84	287	274
18	Andrea Aguilera	24.09.1993	184	74	299	284
19	Itzel Gaytan	21.10.1992	170	65	270	260

== Peru ==
- Head Coach: Luca Cristofani

#	Name	Date of birth	Height	Weight	Spike	Block
1	Angélica Aquino	10.08.1990	170	65	279	268
2	Mirtha Uribe	12.03.1985	182	67	297	286
3	Paola García	25.08.1987	186	78	300	328
4	Patricia Soto (c)	10.02.1980	179	67	300	295
5	Vanessa Palacios	03.07.1984	167	66	275	268
7	Yulissa Zamudio	24.03.1976	184	61	315	300
12	Carla Rueda	19.04.1990	180	65	284	280
13	Zoila La Rosa	31.05.1990	171	57	285	280
14	Elena Keldibekova	23.06.1974	177	72	289	280
15	Karla Ortíz	20.10.1991	178	60	300	290
16	Luren Baylon	14.08.1977	180	76	295	291

== Puerto Rico ==
- Head Coach: David Alemán

#	Name	Date of birth	Height	Weight	Spike	Block
1	Daly Santana	19.02.1995	183	65	300	274
3	Vilmarie Mojica (c)	13.08.1985	177	63	295	274
5	Sarai Álvarez	03.04.1986	189	61	295	286
6	Yarimar Rosa	20.06.1988	188	58	295	285
7	Stephanie Enright	15.12.1990	183	74	309	295
9	Áurea Cruz	10.01.1982	182	63	310	290
10	Diana Reyes	29.04.1993	191	80	303	299
13	Shirley Ferrer	23.06.1991	183	63	290	293
14	Glorimar Ortega	21.11.1983	179	70	297	285
15	Shara Venegas	18.09.1992	172	58	280	270
17	Linda Morales	20.05.1988	193	94	302	296
19	Amanda Vázquez	30.03.1984	194	94	302	297

== Trinidad and Tobago ==
- Head Coach: Francisco Cruz Jiménez

#	Name	Date of birth	Height	Weight	Spike	Block
1	Andrea Kinsale	24.12.1989	188	65	315	297
3	Channon Thompson	29.03.1984	180	72	315	303
4	Kelly-Anne Billingy	15.05.1986	187	87	316	303
5	Shurvette Beckles	10.06.1990	184	65	303	294
6	Sinead Jack	08.11.1993	188	65	314	294
9	Rheeza Grant	10.08.1986	181	70	294	279
10	Courtnee-Mae Clifford	06.07.1990	165	60	280	273
11	Phylecia Armstrong	26.07.1984	185	72	289	282
13	Cabbrini Foncette	19.07.1989	186		304	290
15	Abby Blackman	27.06.1993	183	65	304	293
16	Krystle Esdelle (c)	01.08.1984	187	67	291	282
17	Abigail Gloud	15.07.1987	182	65	285	282

== United States ==
- Head Coach: Hugh McCutcheon

#	Name	Date of birth	Height	Weight	Spike	Block
2	Alisha Glass	05.04.1988	184	72	305	300
4	Angela Forsett	06.06.1986	173	74	289	266
6	Nicole Davis	24.04.1982	167	73	284	266
9	Jennifer Tamas	23.11.1982	191	82	315	301
10	Kimberly Glass	18.08.1984	190	75	314	299
11	Jordan Larson	16.10.1986	188	75	302	295
12	Nancy Metcalf	12.11.1978	186	73	314	292
13	Christa Harmotto	12.10.1986	188	79	322	300
14	Nicole Fawcett	16.12.1986	191	82	310	291
16	Foluke Akinradewo	05.10.1987	191	79	331	300
17	Mary Spicer	03.07.1987	175	65	292	280
18	Megan Hodge	15.10.1988	191	74	330	317
