= 2010 Women's Pan-American Volleyball Cup squads =

This article shows all participating team squads at the 2010 Women's Pan-American Volleyball Cup, held from June 18 to 27, 2010 in Rosarito, and Tijuana, Mexico.

== Argentina ==
- Head coach: Horacio Bastit

#	Name	Date of birth	Height	Weight	Spike	Block
2	Antonela Bortolozzi	22.01.1986	182	72	298	278
3	Yamila Nizetich	27.01.1989	183	76	305	295
4	Leticia Boscacci	08.11.1985	184	70	304	294
5	Lucía Fresco	14.05.1991	193	98	308	297
6	Aylin Pereyra	02.07.1988	180	68	300	292
8	Emilce Sosa	11.09.1987	177	65	307	282
10	Lucía Bertaina	22.02.1982	175	65	285	268
11	Georgina Pinedo (c)	30.05.1981	175	65	305	295
12	Marianela Robinet	24.11.1983	172	54	286	275
13	Florencia Carlotto	14.10.1988	171	72	302	291
16	Florencia Busquets	27.06.1989	189	65	309	294
17	Antonela Curatola	23.10.1991	173	72	280	275

== Brazil ==
- Head coach: Luizomar De Moura

#	Name	Date of birth	Height	Weight	Spike	Block
2	Francyne Jacintho	16.07.1992	190	65	305	297
3	Ana Beatriz Correa	07.02.1992	187	74	290	285
4	Rosane Maggioni (c)	04.01.1992	183	73	288	285
5	Priscila Heldes	27.03.1992	178	65	286	279
6	Sthefanie Paulino	04.03.1993	191	75	307	300
7	Carolina Azedo	17.01.1992	183	79	285	282
9	Isabela Paquardi	03.04.1992	181	75	288	283
10	Eduarda Kraisch	07.05.1993	190	58	303	297
11	Gabriella Souza	14.12.1993	176	54	295	274
13	Fernanda Kuchenbecker	24.01.1992	184	60	290	285
14	Marjorie Correa	12.09.1992	185	59	295	289
20	Killara Mattos dos Santos	01.01.1992	160	60	230	200

== Canada ==
- Head coach: Arnd Ludwig

#	Name	Date of birth	Height	Weight	Spike	Block
2	Julie Young	07.03.1986	188	72	287	273
3	Janie Guimond	11.04.1984	165	64	284	263
4	Tammy Mahon (c)	04.11.1980	180	76	298	282
7	Tonya Mokelki	10.05.1985	182	67	309	288
8	Carla Bradstock	11.08.1985	178	68	282	271
9	Sarah Pavan	16.08.1986	196	73	314	302
10	Marisa Field	10.07.1987	189	71	309	291
12	Sherline Tasha Holness	11.02.1980	188	80	312	295
14	Ashley Voth	24.09.1988	188	70	302	283
16	Jennifer Hinze	20.05.1988	186	75	306	284
18	Kyla Richey	20.06.1989	188	79	302	287
19	Lauren O'Reilly	04.04.1989	178	69	293	273

== Costa Rica ==
- Head coach: Braulio Godínez

#	Name	Date of birth	Height	Weight	Spike	Block
1	Dionisia Thompson	09.06.1978	161	78	287	278
3	Viviana Murillo Chávez	06.02.1992	164	63	258	249
7	Mariela Quesada	08.07.1987	177	70	290	280
9	Verania Willis (c)	23.09.1979	182	73	303	285
10	Paola Ramírez	23.02.1987	186	85	294	285
11	Kyara Jiménez	23.03.1992	174	65	280	269
13	Tamara Piva Matarrita	22.05.1990	182	75	285	280
14	Irene Fonseca	10.10.1985	182	70	285	272
15	Marcela Araya	24.09.1992	167	52	268	254
16	Mijal Hines Cuza	15.12.1993	186	80	290	280
18	María Fernanda Conejo	24.08.1992	182	75	282	270
19	Angélica Jiménez Fallas	21.02.1990	185	85	280	275

== Cuba ==
- Head coach: Juan Carlos Gala

#	Name	Date of birth	Height	Weight	Spike	Block
1	Wilma Salas	09.03.1991	188	60	313	298
2	Yanelis Santos	30.03.1986	183	71	315	312
4	Yoana Palacios	06.10.1990	184	72	321	300
6	Daymara Lescay	05.09.1992	184	72	308	290
7	Lisbet Arredondo	22.11.1987	181	62	315	312
9	Rachel Sánchez	09.01.1989	188	75	325	320
10	Ana Cleger	27.11.1989	185	73	315	297
11	Leanny Castañeda	18.10.1986	188	70	325	320
13	Rosanna Giel	10.06.1992	187	62	320	315
14	Kenia Carcaces	22.01.1986	188	69	308	306
15	Yusidey Silié (c)	11.11.1984	183	80	316	300
17	Gyselle Silva	29.10.1991	184	70	302	295

== Dominican Republic ==
- Head coach: Marcos Kwiek

#	Name	Date of birth	Height	Weight	Spike	Block
1	Annerys Vargas	07.08.1981	196	70	327	320
3	Lisvel Elisa Eve	10.09.1991	194	70	325	315
5	Brenda Castillo	05.06.1992	167	55	245	230
7	Niverka Marte	19.10.1990	178	71	295	283
8	Cándida Arias	11.03.1992	194	68	320	315
10	Milagros Cabral (c)	17.10.1978	182	63	325	320
11	Jeoselyna Rodríguez	09.12.1991	187	63	325	315
12	Karla Echenique	16.05.1986	180	62	300	290
13	Cindy Rondón	12.11.1988	186	61	320	315
14	Prisilla Rivera	29.12.1984	183	70	309	305
17	Gina Mambrú	21.01.1986	182	65	330	315
19	Ana Yorkira Binet	09.02.1992	174	62	280	260

== Mexico ==
- Head coach: José A. Bernal

#	Name	Date of birth	Height	Weight	Spike	Block
1	Karla Sainz	22.07.1993	184	70	298	285
2	Lizbeth Sainz	14.12.1995	178	55	295	285
3	Ana Nieto	18.01.1994	182	61	298	291
5	Andrea Rangel	19.05.1993	178	57	292	283
6	Samantha Bricio	22.11.1994	185	58	296	283
7	Alejandra Perales	11.08.1992	173	57	289	279
9	Alicia Castro	27.12.1994	175	58	290	278
10	Gabriela Zazueta	05.09.1994	173	67	272	264
12	Claudia Rodríguez (c)	10.08.1981	188	80	300	292
13	Andrea Aguilera	24.09.1993	188	74	299	284
15	Zaira Orellana	03.05.1989	183	65	295	287
16	Grecia Rivera	08.06.1992	178	61	291	283

== Peru ==
- Head coach: Cheol Yong Kim

#	Name	Date of birth	Height	Weight	Spike	Block
1	Angélica Aquino	10.08.1990	171	68	277	260
2	Mirtha Uribe	12.03.1985	182	67	297	286
3	Paola García	25.08.1987	186	78	294	280
4	Patricia Soto	10.02.1980	179	67	300	295
5	Vanessa Palacios	03.07.1984	167	66	255	250
6	Jessenia Uceda	14.08.1981	178	69	304	300
7	Yulissa Zamudio	24.03.1976	184	61	320	300
10	Leyla Chihuán (c)	04.09.1975	180	67	297	306
12	Carla Rueda	19.04.1990	181	65	284	280
13	Zoila La Rosa	31.05.1990	174	60	276	266
14	Elena Keldibekova	23.06.1974	177	72	289	280
15	Karla Ortíz	20.10.1991	178	60	296	290

== Puerto Rico ==
- Head coach: Carlos Cardona

#	Name	Date of birth	Height	Weight	Spike	Block
1	Deborah Seilhamer	10.04.1985	182	68	280	272
2	Xaimara Colón	11.09.1988	176	62	255	246
3	Vilmarie Mojica (c)	13.08.1985	177	63	295	274
4	Tatiana Encarnación	28.07.1985	182	66	301	288
5	Sarai Álvarez	03.04.1986	189	61	295	286
7	Stephanie Enright	15.12.1990	183	74	309	295
8	Shirley Ferrer	23.06.1991	182	66	298	294
10	Shanon Torregrosa	11.02.1981	182	68	307	287
14	Glorimar Ortega	21.11.1983	181	64	288	284
16	Alexandra Oquendo	03.02.1984	189	64	298	297
17	Sheila Ocasio	17.11.1982	192	74	310	292
18	Jetzabel Del Valle	19.12.1979	185	73	305	292

== Trinidad and Tobago ==
- Head coach: Francisco Cruz Jiménez

#	Name	Date of birth	Height	Weight	Spike	Block
1	Andrea Kinsale	24.12.1989	188	65	315	297
2	Jalicia Ross	26.07.1984	185	72	289	282
3	Channon Thompson	29.03.1984	182	72	289	277
4	Kelly-Anne Billingy	15.05.1986	187	87	316	303
5	Shurvette Beckle	08.11.1993	189	65	289	290
6	Sinead Jack	08.11.1993	188	65	314	294
7	Abby Blackman	27.06.1993	183	65	304	293
9	Rheeza Grant	10.08.1986	181	70	294	279
10	Courtneemae Clifford	06.07.1990	165	60	275	270
14	Delana Mitchell	23.09.1987	180	65	290	285
16	Krystle Esdelle (c)	01.08.1984	187	67	291	282
17	Abigail Gloud	15.07.1987	182	65	285	282

== United States ==
- Head coach: Hugh McCutcheon

#	Name	Date of birth	Height	Weight	Spike	Block
1	Ogonna Nnamani	29.07.1983	185	80	315	305
2	Alisha Glass	05.04.1988	183	84	300	285
3	Christa Harmotto	12.10.1986	188	79	322	300
5	Stacy Sykora	24.06.1977	176	61	305	295
6	Tamari Miyashiro	08.07.1987	171	72	275	268
7	Heather Bown	29.11.1978	188	90	301	290
8	Cynthia Barboza	07.02.1987	183	73	310	285
11	Jordan Larson	16.10.1986	188	75	302	295
12	Nancy Metcalf	12.11.1978	186	73	314	292
15	Courtney Thompson	04.11.1984	170	66	276	263
16	Foluke Akinradewo	05.10.1987	191	75	327	303
18	Megan Hodge	15.10.1988	191	74	330	317
