= Espejo =

Espejo may refer to:

== Media ==
- El Espejo, 1943 Argentine drama film
- Espejo de paciencia, 1608 epic poem by Spanish writer Silvestre de Balboa
- Espejo de sombras, 1960 Mexican telenovela
- La mujer en el espejo, 2004–2005 Colombian soap opera
- Espejo (album), 2018 album by Javiera Mena

== People with the surname ==
- Antonio Espejo (disambiguation), multiple people
- Carlos Espejo (1923–2014), Argentine swimmer
- Dani Espejo (born 1993), Spanish footballer
- Diego Espejo (born 2002), Spanish footballer
- Elvira Espejo Ayca (born 1981), indigenous Bolivian artist and curator
- Eugenio Espejo (1747–1795), Spanish physician and writer
- Eva Espejo (born 1986), Mexican football manager
- Francisca Espejo (born 1989), Chilean volleyball player
- Francisco Espejo (1758–1812), Venezuelan lawyer, revolutionary, politician and President of Venezuela
- Francisco de Cárdenas Espejo (1817–1898), Spanish lawyer, journalist and politician
- Gianfranco Espejo (1988–2011), Peruvian footballer
- Jerónimo Espejo (1801–1889), Argentine military general
- Jorge Espejo (born 1976), Peruvian footballer and manager
- José Luis Espejo Pérez (born 1965), Spanish writer
- José María Espejo-Saavedra Conesa (born 1976), Spanish politician
- Juana Alicia Espejo, Argentine politician
- Manuela de la Santa Cruz y Espejo (1753–1829), Spanish-Colombian journalist, nurse, feminist and revolutionary
- Marck Espejo (born 1997), Filipino volleyball player
- Sergio Espejo (born 1967), Chilean politician and lawyer
- Tomás Dolz de Espejo (1879–1974), Spanish noble, politician and businessman

== Places ==
- Espejo, Álava, a village and concejo in Spain
- Espejo, Córdoba, a city and commune in Spain
- Espejo Canton, a canton of Ecuador
- Espejo Lake, a lake in Argentina
- Lo Espejo, a commune of Chile
- Manantial Espejo mine, a silver mine in Argentina
- Pico Espejo, a mountain in the Venezuela
