= Isidora =

- Gender: female

Origin
- Origin: Greek
- Meaning: "gift of Isis"

Other names
- Nicknames: Isi, Izzy
- Related names: Isadora

Isidora or Isadora is a female given name of Greek origin, derived from Ἰσίδωρος, Isídōros (a compound of Ἶσις, Ísis, and δῶρον, dōron: "gift of [the goddess] Isis").

The male equivalent is Isidore. The name survived the suppression of the worship of the Egyptian goddess Isis in the newly Christianized Roman Empire, and is, among others, the name of several Christian saints. Similar "gift" names include the Greek "Theodore" and Slavic "Bogdan" (both meaning "gift of God"), the Persian "Mithradates" ("gift of Mithras") and Datis ("gift"), and the Hebrew "Matanya" ("gift of Jah"). The Indo-European "gift" names are ultimately derived from the *PIE root *deh₃-, "to give".

It was the ninth most popular name for baby girls in Chile in 2006.

== People ==
- Saint Isidora, Christian 4th century saint and nun
- Isidora Aguirre (1919–2011), Chilean writer
- Isadora Beduschi (born 2008), Brazilian rhythmic gymnast
- Isadora Bennett (1900–1980), American publicity agent for modern dance theatre
- Isidora Bjelica (1967–2020), Serbian writer
- Isadora Cerullo (born 1991), Brazilian-American rugby sevens player
- Isadora Duncan (1877 or 1878–1927), American dancer
- Isadora Sofia Figueroa, (born 2000), Puerto Rican actress and singer
- Isadora Freitas (born 1990), Brazilian association football player
- Isidora Goreshter (born 1981), American actress
- Isidora Goyenechea (1836–1897), Chilean industrialist
- Isidora Hernández (born 1996), Chilean footballer
- Isidora Jiménez (born 1993), Chilean sprinter
- Isadora Lopes de Souza (born 1997), Brazilian rugby sevens player
- Isadora Newman (1878–1955), American artist, poet, writer, playwright and storyteller
- Isidora Niemeyer (born 2001), Chilean rower
- Isidora Olave (born 2002), Chilean footballer
- Isadora Oliveira (born 2007), Brazilian rhythmic gymnast
- Isadora Pompeo (born 1999), Brazilian Christian musician
- Isadora Ribeiro (born 1965), Brazilian actress
- Isadora Rodrigues Pacheco (born 2005), Brazilian skateboarder
- Isidora Santa María (born 1993), Chilean volleyball player
- Isidora Sekulić (1877–1958), Serbian writer and adventurer
- Isadora Silva (born 1997), Brazilian rhythmic gymnast
- Isidora Simijonović, Serbian actress
- Isidora Steinmetz (born 1994), Chilean volleyball player
- Isadora Verwey, South African actress
- Isadora Williams (born 1996), Brazilian-American figure skater
- Isidora Zegers (1803–1869), Spanish artist and composer
- Isidora Žebeljan (1967-2020), Serbian composer
- Isadora Zubillaga (born 1968), Venezuelan diplomat and activist.

== Fictional characters ==
- Isadora Quagmire, in the A Series of Unfortunate Events novel series
- Isadora Smackle, in the American television series Girl Meets World
- Isadore Daniels, in the American film Jump In!
- Isidora is the main antagonist in the DLC ‘’Curse of the Pharaohs’’ for the 2017 game ‘’Assassin's Creed: Origins’’
- Isadora Moon, the half-vampire, half-fairy heroine of a series of children’s books of the same name
- Isadora Artiñán, in the Spanish Netflix series Élite
