= 2010 Central American and Caribbean Games women's volleyball squads =

This article shows all participating women's volleyball squads at the 2010 Central American and Caribbean Games, held from July 18 to July 29, 2010 in Mayagüez, Puerto Rico.

== Barbados ==
- Head Coach: Andrew Brathwaite

#	Name	Date of birth	Height	Weight	Spike	Block
2	Anicia Wood	25.07.1985	185	60	292	285
3	Janelle Chase-Mayer (c)	20.02.1981	183	60	273	269
4	Danielle Burnham	15.08.1984	183	68	270	267
7	Melissa Brandford	01.06.1979	175	75	265	265
8	Shari Matthews	08.10.1985	172	68	305	289
9	Sharon Bovell	09.12.1975	170	70	289	275
10	Julia Lewis	24.06.1978	180	72	290	280
11	Raquel Raizman-Mendes	17.10.1985	158	70	255	255
15	Tamar Maynard	01.06.1984	170	72	265	258
16	Tronya Joseph	18.09.1986	175	75	285	276
17	Avara Brown	24.02.1982	180	80	290	280
18	Marissa Dowell	10.09.1990	155	72	254	250

== Costa Rica ==
- Head Coach: Braulio Godínez

#	Name	Date of birth	Height	Weight	Spike	Block
1	Dionisia Thompson	09.06.1978	169	78	285	278
2	Catalina Fernández Campos	12.12.1986	180	70	285	280
4	Adriana Chinchilla	29.03.1980	170	65	285	270
5	Karen Cope	06.11.1985	173	55	313	287
6	Angela Willis	26.01.1977	188	67	305	292
7	Mariela Quesada	08.07.1987	177	70	290	280
8	Susana Chávez	24.11.1986	160	55	268	255
9	Verania Willis (c)	23.09.1979	182	73	303	285
10	Paola Ramírez	23.02.1987	186	85	294	285
14	Irene Fonseca	10.10.1985	182	75	285	280
16	Mijal Hines Cuza	15.12.1993	186	80	290	280
17	Marianela Alfaro	28.03.1985	166	59	270	268

== Dominican Republic ==
- Head Coach: Marcos Kwiek

#	Name	Date of birth	Height	Weight	Spike	Block
1	Annerys Vargas	07.08.1981	194	70	325	315
2	Dahiana Burgos	07.04.1985	188	58	312	302
3	Lisvel Elisa Eve	10.09.1991	189	70	250	287
5	Brenda Castillo	05.06.1992	167	55	220	270
7	Niverka Marte	19.10.1990	178	71	233	283
10	Milagros Cabral (c)	17.10.1978	181	63	308	305
11	Jeoselyna Rodríguez	09.12.1991	184	63	242	288
12	Karla Echenique	16.05.1986	181	62	279	273
13	Cindy Rondón	12.11.1988	189	61	312	305
14	Prisilla Rivera	29.12.1984	186	70	312	308
17	Altagracia Mambrú	21.01.1986	180	55	312	302
19	Ana Yorkira Binet	09.02.1992	174	62	267	288

== Guatemala ==
- Head Coach: Leivys García

#	Name	Date of birth	Height	Weight	Spike	Block
1	Íngrid López Guerra	19.06.1987	161	52	263	240
2	Lourdes Parellada	22.03.1989	181	90	283	275
3	Blanca Recinos	08.03.1991	173	60	281	260
4	Rut Beatriz Gomes	24.04.1991	183	70	290	280
5	Julianne Burmester	09.03.1984	183	70	290	235
6	Jemilyn Flores	14.12.1992	176	63	282	270
7	Diana Arias Azurdia	09.05.1984	168	63	281	272
8	Walda Maldonado	03.03.1986	158	54	250	240
9	Andrea Díaz Celada	15.10.1989	168	70	283	276
10	María Estrada Santizo	11.08.1992	170	64	285	276
11	Tiffany Villafranco	28.10.1993	170	58	286	278
12	Aneliesse Burmester (c)	15.03.1983	170	75	283	276

== Mexico ==
- Head Coach: José A. Bernal

#	Name	Date of birth	Height	Weight	Spike	Block
1	Karla Sainz	22.07.1993	184	70	298	285
3	Ana Nieto	18.01.1994	182	61	298	291
5	Andrea Rangel	19.05.1993	178	57	292	283
6	Samantha Bricio	22.11.1994	185	58	296	283
7	Alejandra Perales	11.08.1992	173	57	289	279
8	Xitali Herrera	02.01.1992	181	68	282	276
9	Alicia Castro	27.12.1994	175	58	290	278
10	Gabriela Zazueta	05.09.1994	173	67	272	264
11	Claudia Ríos	22.09.1992	180	68	282	264
12	Claudia Rodríguez (c)	10.08.1981	188	80	300	292
15	Zaira Orellana	03.05.1989	183	65	295	287
16	Grecia Rivera	08.06.1992	178	61	291	283

== Nicaragua ==
- Head Coach: René Quintana

#	Name	Date of birth	Height	Weight	Spike	Block
1	Jaqueline Toruño	22.04.1989	176	67	289	260
3	Maryuri Torres	09.12.1993	170	48	265	256
4	Hellen Traña	03.05.1983	180	76	285	273
5	Josafat Díaz	12.11.1993	174	64	265	258
6	Lolette Rodríguez	04.08.1989	171	66	282	271
7	Amalia Hernández García	22.11.1988	172	57	283	272
8	Johana Padilla	20.08.1979	180	80	281	277
9	Claudia Noguera (c)	30.06.1979	171	66	278	267
12	Bertha Fierro	24.10.1984	176	62	285	274
13	Hada Solórzano	23.08.1993	158	48	238	235
14	Claudia Machado	28.10.1991	164	50	258	249
15	María Izquierdo Arce	23.09.1988	163	67	259	250

== Puerto Rico ==
- Head Coach: Carlos Cardona

#	Name	Date of birth	Height	Weight	Spike	Block
1	Deborah Seilhamer	10.04.1985	182	68	280	272
2	Xaimara Colón	11.09.1988	176	62	255	246
3	Vilmarie Mojica (c)	13.08.1985	177	63	295	274
4	Tatiana Encarnación	28.07.1985	182	66	301	288
5	Sarai Álvarez	03.04.1986	189	61	295	286
7	Stephanie Enright	15.12.1990	183	74	309	295
9	Áurea Cruz	10.01.1982	182	63	310	290
11	Karina Ocasio	08.01.1985	192	76	298	288
14	Glorimar Ortega	21.11.1983	181	64	288	284
16	Alexandra Oquendo	03.02.1984	189	64	298	297
17	Sheila Ocasio	17.11.1982	192	74	310	292
18	Jetzabel Del Valle	19.12.1979	185	73	305	292

== Trinidad and Tobago ==
- Head Coach: Francisco Cruz Jiménez

#	Name	Date of birth	Height	Weight	Spike	Block
1	Andrea Kinsale	24.12.1989	188	65	315	297
2	Jalicia Ross	26.07.1984	185	72	289	282
3	Channon Thompson	29.03.1984	182	72	289	277
4	Kelly-Anne Billingy	15.05.1986	187	87	316	303
5	Shurvette Beckle	08.11.1993	189	65	289	290
6	Sinead Jack	08.11.1993	188	65	314	294
9	Rheeza Grant	10.08.1986	181	70	294	279
10	Courtnee-Mae Clifford	06.07.1990	165	60	275	270
14	Delana Mitchell	23.09.1987	180	65	290	285
15	Abby Blackman	27.06.1993	183	65	304	293
16	Krystle Esdelle (c)	01.08.1984	187	67	291	282
17	Abigail Gloud	15.07.1987	182	65	285	282
