= Christa Harmotto =

American volleyball player (born 1986)

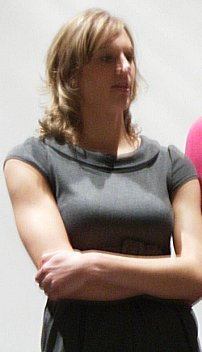

Personal information
- Full name: Christa Deanne Harmotto
- Born: October 12, 1986 (age 40); Sewickley, Pennsylvania, U.S.
- Height: 6 ft 2 in (1.88 m)
- Weight: 174 lb (79 kg)
- Spike: 124 in (315 cm)
- Block: 121 in (307 cm)
- Education: Penn State University

Volleyball information
- Position: Middle blocker
- Current club: Fenerbahce Grundig
- Number: 13

Career
Years	Teams
2009–2010; 2010–2013; 2013–2014; 2015–2016	Guangdong Evergrande; LIU•JO Volley Modena; Eczacıbaşı VitrA; Fenerbahce Grundig

National team
2009–2016	United States
Medal record
Women's volleyball
Representing the United States
Olympic Games
Silver medal – second place	2012 London	Team
Bronze medal – third place	2016 Rio de Janeiro	Team
World Championship
Gold medal – first place	2014 Italy	Team
World Cup
Bronze medal – third place	2015 Japan	Team
World Grand Prix
Gold medal – first place	2012 Ningbo	Team
Gold medal – first place	2015 Omaha	Team
Silver medal – second place	2016 Bangkok	Team
Pan American Cup
Bronze medal – third place	2010 Rosarito & Tijuana	Team
Bronze medal – third place	2011 Ciudad Juárez	Team

Christa Deanne Harmotto Dietzen (born October 12, 1986) is an American former professional volleyball player who played as a middle blocker for the United States women's national volleyball team. She played college volleyball for the Penn State women's volleyball team, and won back to back national championships in 2007 and 2008. Harmotto won gold with the national team at the 2014 World Championship, silver at the 2012 London Summer Olympics, and bronze at the 2015 World Cup and 2016 Rio Olympic Games.

== High school and early life ==
Christa Harmotto was born in Sewickley, Pennsylvania and attended Hopewell High School in Aliquippa, where she was a three-year letterwinner in volleyball and two-year letterwinner in basketball.

As a high school senior in 2004, she was named the Pennsylvania State Gatorade Player of the Year and was also an All-American. She was a member of the 2004 USA Women's Junior National Team that won the NORCECA Championship in Winnipeg, Manitoba, Canada and was also selected to the 2005 USA Junior National Team that competed in Ankara, Turkey, at the FIVB Under-20 World Championships.

She set a school record 183 blocks in her junior year at Hopewell and in 2004–05 as a senior she set a school record for hitting percentage at .595. She led Hopewell to a No. 1 Pennsylvania ranking and also helped her squad to a 59–0 record against WPIAL opponents. She played club volleyball for Pittsburgh Renaissance that qualified for the Junior Olympics. Harmotto was considered a top 15 recruit for the class of 2005.

== Penn State ==
Harmotto is a middle hitter and her kills are fast and hard to defend, which is why she had a .492 hitting percentage in 2007 and led the nation in hitting percentage for most of the season in 2008 with a .486 percentage. She is also known as one of the nations top blockers, as she had 200 blocks in 2007 and 166 in 2008.

Harmotto is an education major and was named ESPN The Magazine Academic All-American of the Year in 2008. She has also been named Academic All-Big Ten in 2006, 2007 and 2008. She says her goals after her Penn State career is over is to play internationally and go to the Olympics.

=== 2005 (Freshman) ===
She set the Penn State record for blocks in a four-game match with 13 versus Southern California, and also led the team in blocking with 1.50 blocks per game. She recorded at least six kills in 28 of 29 matches she played in. Harmotto was on her way to becoming a first or second team All-American before she tore her ACL in the last home match of the Big Ten, thereby missing every NCAA match. Despite the season-ending injury, she was named an AVCA Honorable Mention All-American for her efforts and contributions in the regular season.

=== 2006 (Sophomore) ===
Harmotto recovered from her injury, and posted an impressive sophomore campaign. She played in 111 of 114 games that the Nittany Lions played and ranked first on the team in blocks per game (1.58), second on the squad in hitting percentage (.405) and third on the team in kills per game (2.85). Her average of 1.58 blocks per game ranks tied for 10th on Penn State's all-time single-season record list, equaling Terri Zemaitis' 1997 mark. She had a career high 17 kills on .483 hitting in the win versus Minnesota en route to being named the conference player of the week. She helped Penn State to the NCAA Regional Final.

=== 2007 (Junior) ===
As a junior, Harmotto had one of the most nationally recognized performances of the year. She was named the Big Ten Player of the Year, was an AVCA First team All-American, was a Honda Award nominee for volleyball as the top player in the country, and was considered a frontrunner for the National Player of the Year.

She played in 121 of Penn State's 122 games of the year and started all 36 matches. She finished the year with 375 kills on .492 hitting percentage, a percentage which ranks among the top five in NCAA history and also ranked first in the conference and second nationally. She had 200 blocks on the year and averaged 1.65 blocks per game, which tied for fifth in the nation and was second on the team. She equaled her career high of 17 kills with no errors to hit .444 against Wisconsin. She helped her squad to a 20–0 Big Ten record and a 34–2 record overall.

In NCAA play and helping her team win the 2007 NCAA national championship against top seeded Stanford, she was named to the NCAA Final Four All-Tournament Team after having 14 kills and hitting .435 in the championship match.

=== 2008 (Senior) ===
Harmotto had an impressive senior year, leading the nation in hitting percentage from Sep 21 until the end of the season in December. She ended the year with a .486 percentage with 275 total kills. She also had 166 blocks for the season and finished the year third in the nation in blocks per set (1.47). Harmotto repeated as an AVCA First Team All-American and earned her second consecutive Honda Award nomination.

She helped Penn State to their second consecutive 20–0 Big Ten season, without dropping a single set to any teams. In the 2008 NCAA Tournament, she was named to the NCAA University Park Regional All-Tournament Team after helping her team advance to the NCAA Final Four after sweeping Western Michigan and California.

In the National Semifinals against Nebraska, Harmotto had 7 kills and 4 blocks. In the NCAA national championship against Stanford, Harmotto had 8 kills and 6 blocks to help Penn State to a 38–0 record and claimed their second consecutive NCAA Championship.

Harmotto ended her career with a .433 career hitting percentage – second best in NCAA history.

== National team ==
Harmotto was selected to the U.S. National Team roster that traveled to Cairo, Egypt in April 2009. The U.S. team played two matches against the Egypt National Team. In the first match against Egypt, which USA won 3–1, Harmotto had a team high 18 points, including 16 kills with a 64 kill percent and .560 attack efficiency.

In May 2009, Harmotto began to train with the U.S. National Team. She participated in the 2009 Women's Pan-American Volleyball Cup in July, the 2009 FIVB World Grand Prix in August and the 2009 Final Four Intercontinental Cup in Lima, Peru in September. At the Final Four Cup, Harmotto was starter in all five matches. She averaged 0.95 blocks per set, totaled 19 blocks in five matches and was named the tournament's "Best Blocker". She helped Team USA to the gold medal match, where they lost to World No. 1 Brazil in four sets.

Harmotto was part of the USA national team that won the 2014 World Championship gold medal when the team defeated China 3-1 in the final match.

== Awards ==
=== National team ===
- 2009 Final Four Cup
- 2010 Pan-American Volleyball Cup
- 2010 FIVB World Grand Prix
- 2011 Pan-American Volleyball Cup
- 2011 Women's NORCECA Volleyball Continental Championship
- 2011 FIVB World Grand Prix
- 2012 FIVB World Grand Prix
- 2012 Summer Olympics
- 2013 FIVB World Grand Champions Cup
- 2013 Women's NORCECA Volleyball Continental Championship
- 2014 FIVB World Championship
- 2015 FIVB World Grand Prix
- 2015 FIVB Women's World Cup
- 2015 Women's NORCECA Volleyball Continental Championship
- 2016 Women's NORCECA Olympic Qualification Tournament
- 2016 FIVB World Grand Prix
- 2016 Summer Olympics

=== College ===
- Four time AVCA All-American (2005–08)
- Four time AVCA First Team All-Mideast Region (2005–08)
- Four time First Team All-Big Ten (2005–08)
- 2008 Dapper Dan Sportswoman of the Year nominee
- 2008 Volleyball Magazine First Team All-American
- 2008 CVU National Blocker of the Year
- 2008 Honda Award nominee
- 2008 NCAA University Park Regional All-Tournament Team
- 2008 ESPN The Magazine Academic All-American of the Year
- 2008 ESPN The Magazine First Team Academic All-District
- 2008 Academic All-Big Ten
- 2008 Penn State Golden Volleyball for reaching 1,000 career kills
- 2008 Hampton Inn Penn State Classic All-Tournament Team
- 2008 Hawaiian Airlines Classic All-Tournament Team
- 2008 Nittany Lion Invitational All-Tournament Team
- 2008 Preseason All-Big Ten
- 2007 CVU National Player of the Year
- 2007 CVU National Blocker of the Year
- 2007 Big Ten Player of the Year
- 2007 Honda Award nominee
- 2007 Dapper Dan Sportswoman of the Year nominee
- 2007 NCAA Final Four All-Tournament Team
- 2007 Volleyball Magazine First Team All-American
- 2007 Volleyball Magazine Most Improved Player
- 2007 ESPN The Magazine Third Team Academic All-American
- 2007 ESPN The Magazine First Team Academic All-District
- 2007 Academic All-Big Ten
- 2007 University Park NCAA Regional All-Tournament Team
- 2007 Penn State Female Athlete of the Week (10/23, 11/26)
- 2007 Yale Classic All-Tournament Team
- 2007 Holiday Inn Downtown Husker All-Tournament Team
- 2007 Big Ten Player of the Week (8/27, 9/24, 10/15)
- 2007 Preseason All-Big Ten
- 2006 Big Ten Player of the Week (10/2)
- 2006 Volleyball Magazine second Team All-American
- 2006 Penn State Invitational All-Tournament Team
- 2006 LSU Classic All-Tournament Team
- 2006 Unanimous preseason All-Big Ten
- 2006 Academic All-Big Ten
- 2006 Penn State Classic All-Tournament Team
- 2005 Penn State Classic Most Valuable Player
- 2005 AVCA Showcase All-Tournament Team
- 2005 Big Ten All-Freshman Team

=== High school ===
- Two time Prepvolleyball.com All-American (2004–05)
- Two time Pittsburgh Post-Gazette Athlete of the Week
- Two time Pittsburgh Tribune-Review Athlete of the Week
- Two time first team all-state, all-WPIAL and all-section
- 2005 Mizuno First Team All-American
- 2005 Pennsylvania State Gatorade Player of the Year
- 2005 Prepvolleyball.com National Senior Player of the Year finalist
- 2005 Dapper Dan High School Female Athlete of the Year
- 2005 Pittsburgh Post-Gazette Female High School Athlete of the Year
- 2005 Beaver County Times Female Athlete of the Year
- 2005 Pittsburgh Tribune-Review Female Athlete of the Year
- 2005 Volleyball Magazine "Fab 50"

== See also ==
- Penn State Nittany Lions women's volleyball
- List of Pennsylvania State University Olympians

Awards
Preceded by (Brazil) Fabiana Claudino (Russia) Irina Fetisova	Best Blocker of FIVB World Grand Prix; 2015 ex aequo (Brazil) Juciely Barreto	Succeeded by (United States) Rachael Adams (Brazil) Thaísa Menezes
