= Emilce Sosa =

Argentine volleyball player

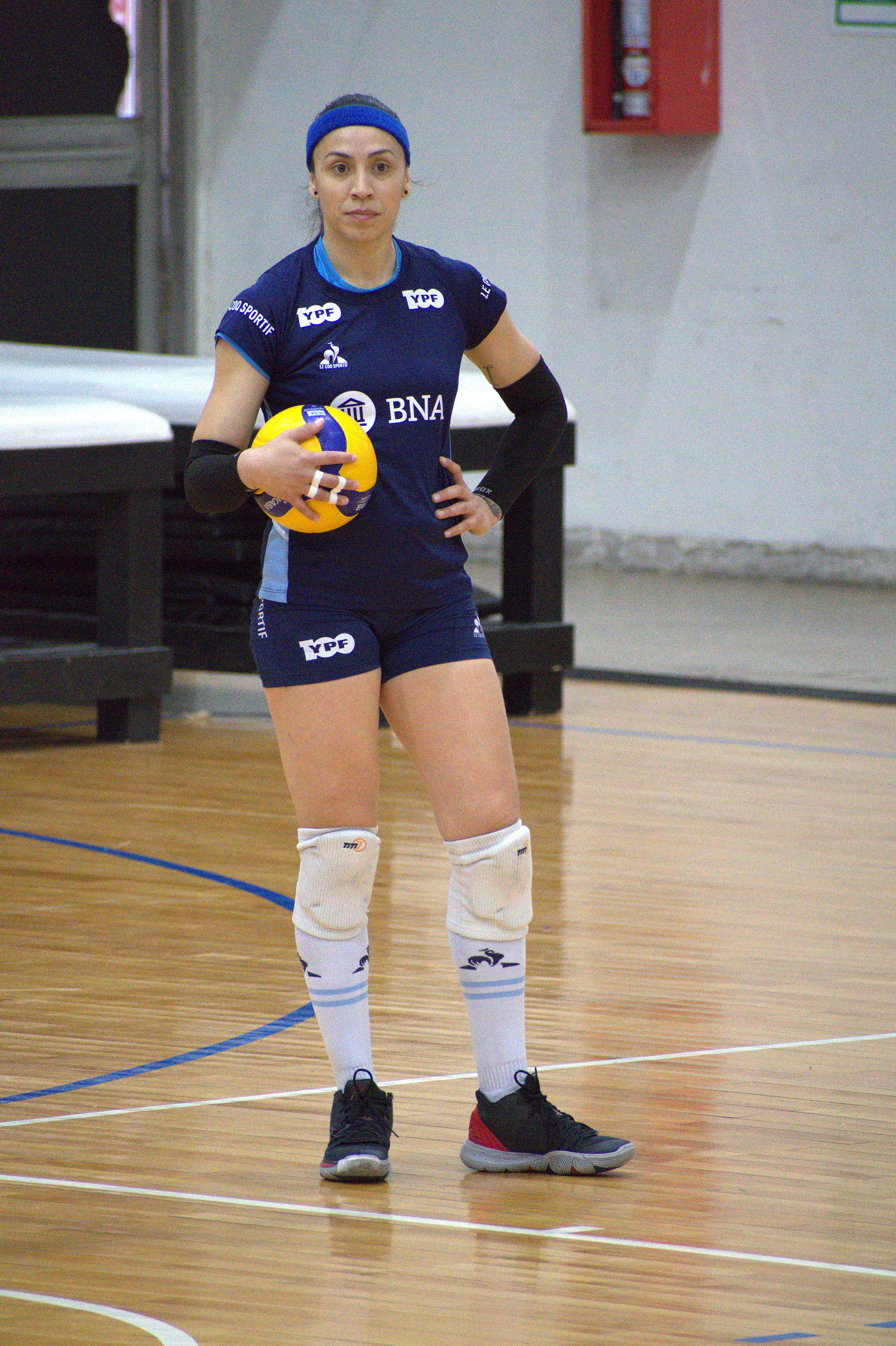

Personal information
- Full name: Emilce Fabiana Sosa
- Nickname: Mimí
- Nationality: Argentina
- Born: 11 September 1987 (age 39); Ibarreta, Argentina
- Height: 1.77 m (5 ft 10 in)
- Weight: 75 kg (165 lb)
- Spike: 305 cm (120 in)
- Block: 295 cm (116 in)

Volleyball information
- Position: Middle blocker
- Current club: Club Atlético San Lorenzo de Almagro
- Number: 9 & 10 (club and national team)

National team
2009–	Argentina
- Last updated: 10 november 2020

Emilce "Mimi" Sosa (born 11 September 1987) is an Argentine volleyball player who represents Argentina in international competition.

She participated with the Argentina national team at the Pan-American Volleyball Cup (in 2010, 2011, 2012, 2013, 2014, 2015, 2016), the FIVB Volleyball World Grand Prix (in 2011, 2012, 2013, 2014, 2015, 2016), the FIVB Volleyball Women's World Cup (in 2011, 2015), the 2014 FIVB Volleyball Women's World Championship in Italy, 2018 FIVB Volleyball Women's World Championship, the 2015 Pan American Games in Canada, and the 2016 Summer Olympics in Brazil.

At club level, she played for Olimpico Freyre, Instituto de Córdoba, Boca Juniors, CSM București, Ştiinţa Bacău and Rio do Sul before moving to Esporte Clube Pinheiros in 2016.

== Personal life ==
A Quechua descendant, Sosa was born in Ibarreta, a settlement in the Formosa Province (North east Argentina), during her first years, she lived in the nearby city of Las Lomitas. At the time her mother was working in a Wichí community in the west of the province (around 300 km from Las Lomitas) and when Sosa was 8 years, she moved to the community with her father and siblings.

Her first sport was football, it was due to her mother influence that she took on volleyball when she was 14 years and started playing at Club Escuela de Comercio de Las Lomitas. She moved to Córdoba at the age of 16, after being selected to play football for Belgrano de Córdoba and was also playing volleyball at Club Universitario de Córdoba. Only when asked to decide which sport to follow, she chose volleyball. From Universitario de Córdoba she moved to Asociación Deportiva Atenas before starting her professional career at Olímpico de Freyre.

Emilce is openly lesbian and was married to Brazilian volleyball player Milka Silva.

== Clubs ==
- (Argentina) Club Universitario de Córdoba
- (Argentina) Atenas
- (Argentina) Olimpico Freyre (2005–2006)
- (Argentina) Instituto de Córdoba (2006–2007)
- (Argentina) Boca Juniors (2007–2011)
- (Romania) CSM București (2011–2012)
- (Romania) CS Ştiinţa Bacău (2012–2014)
- (Brazil) Rio do Sul (2015–2016)
- (Brazil) Esporte Clube Pinheiros (2016–2017)
- (Brazil) São Caetano Esporte Clube (2017–2018)
- (Brazil) Brasília Vôlei (2018)
- (Argentina) Club Atlético San Lorenzo de Almagro (2020-)
