= Megan Hodge =

American volleyball player

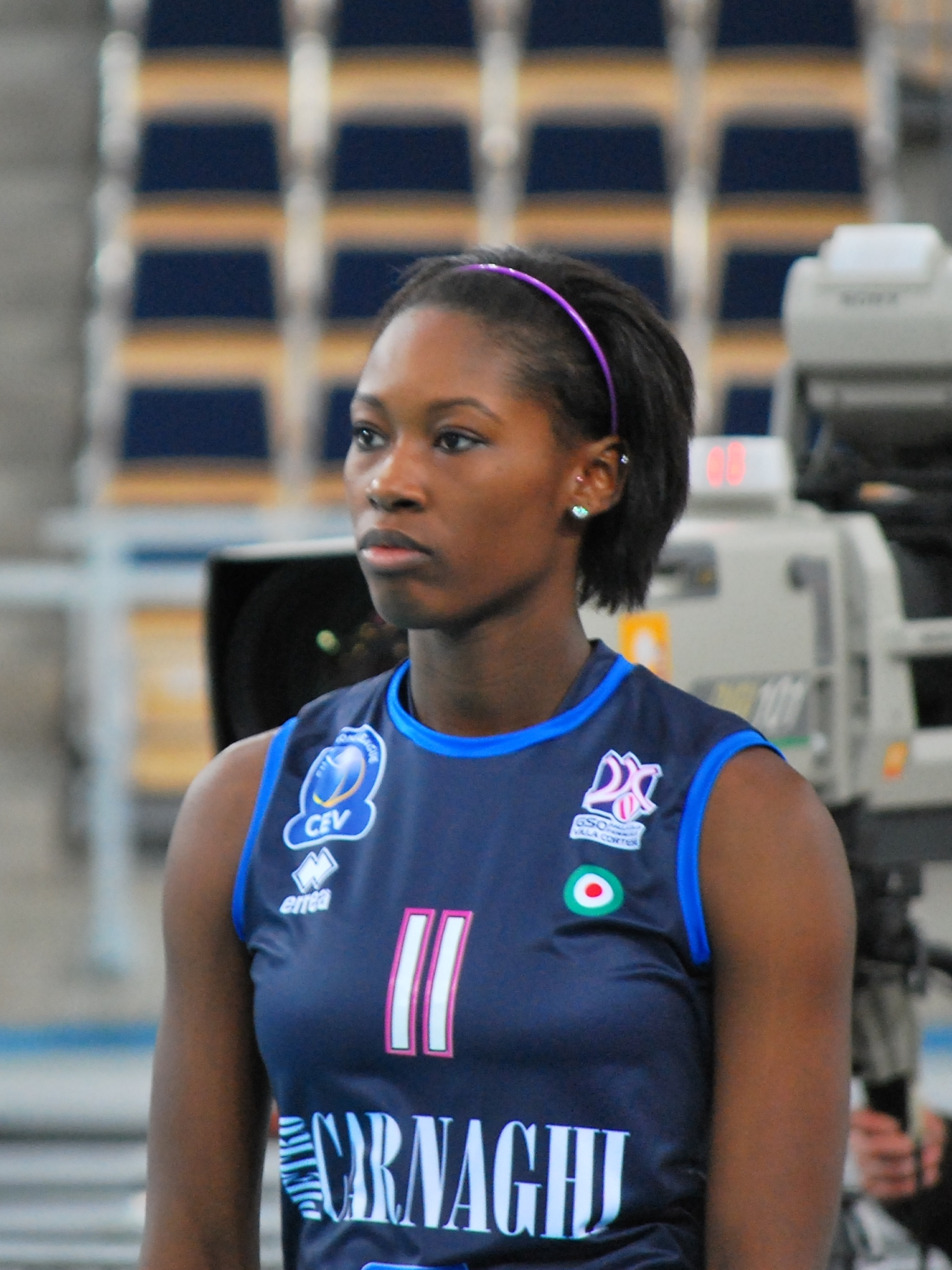

Personal information
- Born: October 15, 1988 (age 38); Saint Thomas, U.S. Virgin Islands, U.S.
- Height: 6 ft 3 in (191 cm)
- Spike: 126 in (320 cm)
- Block: 117 in (297 cm)
- Education: Pennsylvania State University

Volleyball information
- Position: Outside hitter
- Current club: (Brazil) Minas Tênis Clube
- Number: 11 (national team)

Career
Years	Teams
2006–2009; 2010; 2010–11; 2011–12; 2012–13; 2013–2014; 2015–2016; 2016–2017; 2020–	(United States) Penn State University (Puerto Rico) Criollas de Caguas (Italy) MC-Carnaghi Villa Cortese (Poland) Atom Trefl Sopot (Azerbaijan) Azerrail Baku (China) Guangdong Evergrande (Italy) Imoco Volley Conegliano (China) Henan (Brazil) Minas Tênis Clube

National team
2009–2015	United States
Medal record
Women's volleyball
Representing the United States
Olympic Games
Silver medal – second place	2012 London	Team
FIVB World Cup
Silver medal – second place	2011 Japan	Team
Bronze medal – third place	2015 Japan	Team
FIVB World Grand Prix
Gold medal – first place	2010 Ningbo	Team
Gold medal – first place	2011 Macau	Team
Gold medal – first place	2012 Ningbo	Team
Gold medal – first place	2015 Omaha	Team
Pan American Cup
Gold medal – first place	2013 Lima	Team
Bronze medal – third place	2010 Rosarito & Tijuana	Team
Bronze medal – third place	2011 Ciudad Juárez	Team

Megan Hodge Easy (born October 15, 1988) is an American indoor volleyball player who won a silver medal at the 2012 Summer Olympics with the US team and played for Pennsylvania State University's volleyball team. Following college, also played professionally in Puerto Rico, Italy, Poland, Azerbaijan, China, and Brazil. In 2023, Hodge returned to Penn State Volleyball as assistant coach. In 2024, she helped lead the team to the NCAA women's volleyball championship, where it won its eighth national title in program history.

== Early life ==
Hodge was born in St. Thomas, U.S. Virgin Islands. In 1992 when Megan was 3 years old, her family moved to Chapel Hill, North Carolina for educational reasons at UNC. They later then moved to Durham, North Carolina in 1999. Her parents, Michael and Carmen, are both former members of the U.S. Virgin Islands national volleyball team. Her mother, Carmen, played volleyball at George Washington University, and her father played at the University of the Virgin Islands.

Hodge began playing volleyball at age 12, and when she started, she could not stop. She attended Riverside High School, where she was one of the most dominant young players in the nation. She posted a four-year total of 1,596 kills, 319 blocks, 647 digs, 286 aces and 130 assists. Hodge was the best girls' volleyball player in North Carolina history.

She was a four-time Pac-6 all-conference selection and was the Pac-6 Player of the Year two times, including a unanimous selection in 2006. She participated on the USA Youth and Junior National Teams, where she was voted the Most Valuable Player and "Best Attacker" at the 2004 NORCECA Championships in Cataño, Puerto Rico.

Hodge played club volleyball for North Carolina's "Triangle Volleyball Club. She was selected as the Most Valuable Player of the North Carolina Regional Championships in 2004 in the 18's Gold age division, in 2005 for the 17's Platinum division and in 2006 for the 18's Platinum division. She became the first ever player from the Carolina region to be named to the all-Tournament team at the USA Junior Olympic Girls' Volleyball Championships.

After being named the North Carolina Volleyball Gatorade Player of the Year as a junior and senior, she was named the 2006 Gatorade National Player of the Year for volleyball. Hodge was considered the top high school recruit for the class of 2006 and got over 150 scholarship offers from various universities, such as volleyball powerhouses Stanford, USC, Washington, and Long Beach State. She, along with two other top 10 high school recruits, led Penn State to the consensus number 1 recruiting class ranking for the Class of 2006.

== Penn State ==
Hodge is a 6-foot-3-inch (1.91 m) outside hitter, and she can jump and touch 10 feet 8 inches (3.25 m).

Penn State career highlights include scoring the championship winning kill in the 2007 NCAA championship over Stanford, and the championship kill in the 2009 championship against Texas and being named the Big Ten Player of the Year as a freshman, the first freshman to accomplish the feat.

Hodge is a four-time First Team All-American, and was named the NCAA national championship Most Outstanding Player in 2007 and 2008.

=== 2006 (Freshman) ===
In her first season, she led the Big Ten and the team in points per game (5.57) and kills per game (4.83), and was also second on the team in service aces (39) and digs (303). Her 551 kills ranks sixth on the Penn State single-season record chart and is the highest for the rally-scoring era, and she also became only the seventh Nittany Lion player to tally over 500 kills in a single season. She posted a career high 27 kills in the comeback win over Texas on September 8. She tied the school record for kills in a three-game match with 25 in the sweep of Northwestern. She had a career high 20 digs against Michigan, and also had 11 double-double matches on the year.

She made Big Ten history by becoming the first freshman to be named Player of the Year in the then-23 year history of the award. She also became the first ever Big Ten volleyball player to win the Gatorade National Player of the Year and AVCA National Freshman of the Year in consecutive seasons. She became just the third true freshman in seven years to be named a First Team All-American.

=== 2007 (Sophomore) ===
Hodge recorded 4.60 kills per game and had 561 kills on the year. She was the only player to play in all 122 games of the season. Hodge was also tied for second on the team for service aces (35), and also had 310 digs, good for second on the team. Hodge also had a 96% service reception clip, as she recorded only 33 service reception errors in 833 attempts. She finished the season leading the team in total points, as she was responsible for 644.5 total points and 5.28 points per game. She helped Penn State to a 20–0 Big Ten record and their record fifth consecutive conference title.

In the 2007 NCAA Tournament, she led Penn State to their first NCAA final four appearance since their last NCAA title in 1999. She saved one of her best performances for their 3–2 win over top-seeded Stanford in the national championship, as she recorded a season-high 26 kills and had a key serving string in the decisive fifth game win, serving 6 straight points. Her performance in this match led her to be named the NCAA championship Most Outstanding Player, joining former Penn State players Terri Zemaitis (1997) and Lauren Cacciamani (1998 & 1999) to be named the Championship MOP. In addition, Hodge was also named a First Team All-American for the second consecutive year and was a Honda Sports Award nominee for the top volleyball player in the country.

=== 2008 (Junior) ===
As a junior, Hodge led a team consisting of six All-Americans with 470 total kills on the year on a .349 hitting percentage. She led the team in kills 21 times and ended 2008 fifth all-time on Penn State's career kill list with 1,582. Hodge was also named an ESPN The Magazine First Team All-American.

In Big Ten play, Hodge had 246 total kills and averaged 4.10 kills per set, en route to being named a unanimous First Team All-Big Ten selection for the third consecutive year. Penn State went 20–0 in the Big Ten and didn't lose a single set.

In the 2008 NCAA Tournament, Hodge was named the NCAA University Park Regional Most Outstanding Player after having a combined 28 kills with just 4 errors against regional opponents Western Michigan and California. In the NCAA National Semifinals in Omaha, Hodge had a season high 23 kills against Nebraska in the five set win. The following night, Hodge was named an AVCA First Team All-American for the third consecutive year.

In the National Title match against Stanford, Hodge had a match high 16 kills with just 2 errors and added 14 digs and 2 blocks to lead the Lions to their second consecutive NCAA championship, capping off an undefeated year. She was named the NCAA Championship Most Outstanding Player for the second consecutive year, becoming only the third player in NCAA Tournament history to earn the award two times.

=== 2009 (Senior) ===
Her senior year, Hodge's 560 kills helped to once again lead the Penn State Nittany Lions to an NCAA championship. She was named a First Team All-American for the fourth time in a row.

Hodge was also named Big Ten Player of the Year for the second time.

In the National Title match against Texas, the Nittany Lions went down two sets to none but under Hodge's leadership Penn State was able to come back and win it. Hodge tallied 21 kills in the five-set match, one of which came on the final point of the match.

In 2010, she also won the Honda Sports Award as the nation's top female collegiate volleyball player, and went on to be one of the co-winners of the Honda-Broderick Cup, awarded to the nation's top female collegiate athlete.

=== Career outside US ===
In November 2010 she joined Carnaghi Villa Cortese a volleyball team that plays in Italian Serie A1.

Hodge played at the 2013 Club World Championship with Guangdong Evergrande winning the bronze medal after defeating 3–1 to Voléro Zürich.

=== 2012- 2013 ===
Hodge competed for Team USA in the 2012 Grand Prix winning the gold medal and the Most Valuable Player and Best Scorer awards. She later won the silver medal at the 2012 Summer Olympics.

In the Pan-American Cup, Hodge won the Best Spiker award and the gold medal.

=== College career statistics ===
Season	GP/MP	Kills	K/Game	Errors	Total Attempts	Percentage	Assists	Service Aces	Digs	Solo Blocks	Block Assists	Total Blocks	Points
2006	114/35	551	4.83	213	1253	.270	32	39	303	13	64	77	635
2007	122/36	561	4.60	182	1278	.297	40	35	310	9	79	88	644.5
2008	115/38	470	4.09	126	985	.349	33	20	242	8	41	49	518.5
2009	120/38	560	4.67	116	1197	.371	40	13	295	5	78	83	617
Total	471/147	2142	4.55	637	4713	.322	145	107	1150	35	262	297	2415

== Awards ==
=== College ===
- Four-time First Team AVCA All-American (2006–09)
- Four-time unanimous First Team All-Big Ten (2006–09)
- Four-time First Team AVCA All-Mideast Region (2006–09)
- 2010 Honda-Broderick Cup
- 2010 Honda Sports Award winner in Volleyball
- 2009 Honda Sports Award nominee
- 2009 NCAA Final Four All-Tournament Team
- 2009 Big Ten Player of the Year
- 2009 Academic All-American of the Year
- 2009 Gainesville Regional Most Outstanding Player
- 2008 NCAA Championship Most Outstanding Player
- 2008 NCAA Final Four All-Tournament Team
- 2008 NCAA University Park Regional Most Outstanding Player
- 2008 Volleyball Magazine First Team All-American
- 2008 Big Ten Player of the Week (12/1)
- 2008 CoSIDA Second Team Academic All-American
- 2008 Academic All-Big Ten
- 2008 Chicago Classic All-Tournament Team
- 2008 Hawaiian Airlines Classic All-Tournament Team
- 2008 Unanimous Preseason All-Big Ten
- 2007 Volleyball Magazine First Team All-American
- 2007 NCAA Championship Most Outstanding Player
- 2007 NCAA Final Four All-Tournament Team
- 2007 Honda Sports Award nominee
- 2007 Penn State Golden Volleyball for reaching 1,000 kills
- 2007 Penn State Female Student Athlete of the Week (9/10, 12/19)
- 2007 Academic All-Big Ten
- 2007 AVCA National Player of the Week (9/10)
- 2007 Big Ten Player of the Week (9/10)
- 2007 Penn State Classic Most Valuable Player
- 2007 Yale Classic All-Tournament Team
- 2007 Unanimous Preseason All-Big Ten
- 2006 AVCA National Freshman of the Year
- 2006 AVCA Mideast Region Freshman of the Year
- 2006 Volleyball Magazine First Team All-American
- 2006 Volleyball Magazine National Freshman of the Year
- 2006 Big Ten Player of the Year
- 2006 Big Ten Freshman of the Year
- 2006 Big Ten All-Freshman Team
- 2006 NCAA Seattle Regional All-Tournament Team
- 2006 LSU Classic All-Tournament Team
- 2006 Penn State Invitational All-Tournament Team
- 2006 Texas Invitational All-Tournament Team
- 2006 Big Ten Player of the Week (9/25, 10/23, 11/27)

=== High school ===
- Four-time Pac-6 All-Conference (2003–06)
- Three-time USA Volleyball Carolina Region Most Valuable Player (2004–06)
- Two-time North Carolina Gatorade Volleyball Player of the Year (2005–06)
- Two-time Pac-6 Player of the Year (2005–06)
- Two-time Prepvolleyball.com All-American
- 2006 Prepvolleyball.com #1 "Senior Ace" (top recruit)
- 2006 Gatorade National Player of the Year
- 2006 Volleyball Magazine National High School Player of the Year
- 2006 National High School Coaches Association National High School Senior Athlete of the Year
- 2006 News and Observer North Carolina High School Female Athlete of the Year
- 2006 Mizuno Volleyball All-American
- 2006 Volleyball Magazine "Fab 50"
- 2006 AAU All-American
- 2006 North Carolina Regional Championship Most Valuable Player
- 2006 USA Junior Girls' Olympic Volleyball Championships All-Tournament Team
- 2006 Paul Williamson Award
- 2006 Pac-6 Athlete of the Year
- 2004 NORCECA Championships Most Valuable Player
- 2004 NORCECA Championships "Best Attacker"
- 2004 Prepvolleyball.com National Junior of the Year finalist
- 2003 Prepvolleyball.com National Sophomore of the Year finalist

=== National team ===
- 2012 FIVB World Grand Prix MVP, Best scorer
- 2013 Pan-American Cup "Best Spiker"

== See also ==
- Penn State Nittany Lions women's volleyball
- List of Pennsylvania State University Olympians

Awards
Preceded by (United States) Destinee Hooker	Most Valuable Player of FIVB World Grand Prix; 2012	Succeeded by (Brazil) Thaísa Menezes
