= Carla Ruz =

Chilean volleyball player (born 1991)

Personal information
- Nationality: Chilean
- Born: 26 September 1991 (age 35)
- Height: 162 cm (64 in)
- Weight: 58 kg (128 lb)
- Spike: 275 cm (108 in)
- Block: 268 cm (106 in)

Volleyball information
- Position: libero
- Number: 4 (national team)

Career
Years	Teams
2011	(Chile) Universidad Católica

National team
2011	Chile

Carla Ruz (born 26 September 1991) is a retired Chilean female volleyball player, playing as a l. She was part of the Chile women's national volleyball team.

She participated in the 2011 Women's Pan-American Volleyball Cup, and the 2013 Summer Universiade. On club level she played for Universidad Católica in 2011.
