= Kuchenbecker =

Kuchenbecker is a German language surname. Notable people with the surname include:

- Fernanda Kuchenbecker (born 1992), Brazilian volleyball player
- Katherine Kuchenbecker, American volleyball player and haptics researcher
- Otto Kuchenbecker (1907–1990), German basketball player
