= Ignacia Cabrera =

Chilean volleyball player (born 1987)

Personal information
- Nationality: Chilean
- Born: 29 July 1987 (age 39)
- Height: 180 cm (71 in)
- Weight: 68 kg (150 lb)
- Spike: 296 cm (117 in)
- Block: 283 cm (111 in)

Volleyball information
- Number: 11 (national team)

Career
Years	Teams
2011	(Chile) Universidad Católica

National team
2011	Chile

Ignacia Cabrera (born 29 July 1987) is a retired Chilean female volleyball player. She was part of the Chile women's national volleyball team.

She participated at the 2011 Women's Pan-American Volleyball Cup. On club level she played for Universidad Católica in 2011.
