= Camila Jersonsky =

Argentine volleyball player (born 1991)

Personal information
- Nationality: Argentina
- Born: 30 May 1991 (age 35); Buenos Aires, Argentina
- Height: 181 cm (5 ft 11 in)
- Weight: 68 kg (150 lb)
- Spike: 305 cm (120 in)
- Block: 289 cm (114 in)

Volleyball information
- Position: Middle blocker
- Number: 9 (national team)

National team
2009–2012	Argentina
- Last updated: 14 January 2017

Camila Jersonsky (born 30 May 1991) is an Argentine female volleyball player. She was part of the Argentina women's national volleyball team at the Pan-American Volleyball Cup (in 2009 and 2011) and the FIVB Volleyball World Grand Prix (in 2011 and 2012).

At club level she played for Institución cultural y deportiva Pedro Echagüe, Club Atlético y Biblioteca Bell and Auburn University.

== Clubs ==
- (Argentina) Pedro Echagüe
- (Argentina) Bell Vóley (2009–2010)
- (United States) Auburn Tigers (2010–2013)
