= Magdalena Delano =

Chilean volleyball player (born 1993)

Personal information
- Nationality: Chilean
- Born: 5 July 1993 (age 33)
- Height: 176 cm (69 in)
- Weight: 67 kg (148 lb)
- Spike: 280 cm (110 in)
- Block: 277 cm (109 in)

Volleyball information
- Number: 3 (national team)

Career
Years	Teams
2011	(Chile) Universidad Católica

National team
2011	Chile

Magdalena Delano (born 5 July 1993) is a retired Chilean female volleyball player. She was part of the Chile women's national volleyball team.

She participated at the 2011 Women's Pan-American Volleyball Cup. On club level she played for Universidad Católica in 2011.
