= Juliana Nogueira =

Brazilian volleyball player (born 1988)

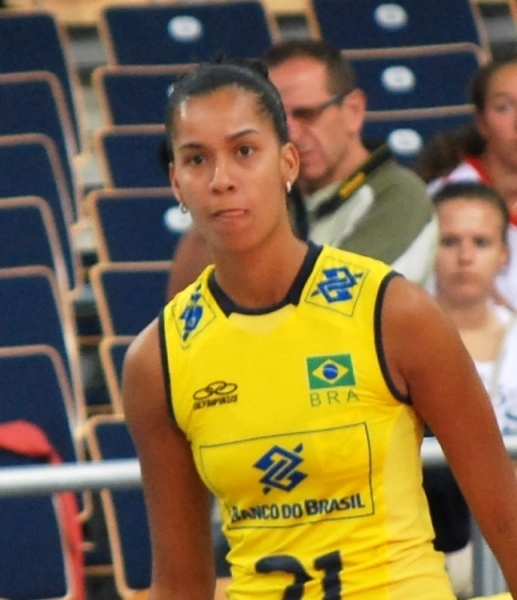

Personal information
- Full name: Juliana de Souza Nogueira
- Nationality: Brazilian
- Born: 4 August 1988 (age 38); Americana, São Paulo
- Height: 1.84 m (6 ft 0 in)
- Weight: 71 kg (157 lb)
- Spike: 312 cm (123 in)
- Block: 289 cm (114 in)

Volleyball information
- Position: Outside spiker

National team
2012	Brazil
Honours
Women's volleyball
Representing Brazil
World Grand Prix
Silver medal – second place	2012 Ningbo
Pan-American Cup
Gold medal – first place	2011 Mexico	Team
Silver medal – second place	2012 Mexico	Team

Juliana de Souza Nogueira (born 4 August 1988) is a Brazilian female volleyball player. She is part of the Brazil women's national volleyball team. She competed at the 2011 FIVB World Grand Prix.

She played for Missouri State University, and University of South Florida.

== Clubs ==
- (Brazil) Finasa/Osasco (2006–2007)
- (Switzerland) Zeiler Köniz (2007–2008)
- (Brazil) Uniara Araraquara (2008–2009)
- (Brazil) Mackenzie Esporte Clube (2009–2010)
- (Brazil) Rio de Janeiro (2010–2012)
- (Brazil) Vôlei Amil-Campinas (2012–2014)
- (Brazil) Minas Tênis Clube (2014–2015)
- (Brazil) Rio do Sul (2015–2016)
- (Brazil) Esporte Clube Pinheiros (2016–2017)
- (Brazil) Vôlei Valinhos (2017–2018)
- (Brazil) Balneário Camboriú (2018–2019)
- (Peru) Jaamsa (2021–2022)
