= Josefa Schuler =

Chilean volleyball player (born 1995)

Personal information
- Nationality: Chilean
- Born: 24 April 1995 (age 31)
- Height: 180 cm (71 in)
- Weight: 65 kg (143 lb)
- Spike: 290 cm (114 in)
- Block: 280 cm (110 in)

Volleyball information
- Number: 13 (national team)

Career
Years	Teams
2011	(Chile) Universidad Católica

National team
2011	Chile

Josefa Schuler (born 24 April 1995) is a retired Chilean female volleyball player. She was part of the Chile women's national volleyball team.

She participated at the 2011 Women's Pan-American Volleyball Cup. On club level she played for Universidad Católica in 2011.
