= Killara Mattos =

Brazilian volleyball player (born 1992)

Personal information
- Full name: Killara Mattos dos Santos
- Nationality: Brazilian
- Born: 1 January 1992 (age 34)
- Height: 160 cm (63 in)
- Weight: 60 kg (132 lb)
- Spike: 230 cm (91 in)
- Block: 200 cm (79 in)

Volleyball information
- Position: libero
- Number: 20 (national team)

National team
| 2010 | Brazil |

Killara Mattos dos Santos (born 1 January 1992) is a retired Brazilian female volleyball player, playing as a libero. She was part of the Brazil women's national volleyball team.

She participated at the 2010 Women's Pan-American Volleyball Cup.

Since retirement, Mattos has started a digital marketing agency with basketball player Jônatas Campos.
