= Florencia Garrido =

Chilean volleyball player (born 1988)

Personal information
- Nationality: Chilean
- Born: 7 October 1988 (age 38)
- Height: 177 cm (70 in)
- Weight: 68 kg (150 lb)
- Spike: 294 cm (116 in)
- Block: 284 cm (112 in)

Volleyball information
- Number: 12 (national team)

Career
Years	Teams
2011	Universidad de Chile

National team
2011	Chile

Florencia Garrido (born 7 October 1988) is a retired Chilean female volleyball player. She was part of the Chile women's national volleyball team.

She participated at the 2011 Women's Pan-American Volleyball Cup. On club level she played for Universidad de Chile in 2011.
