= Francisca Espejo =

Chilean volleyball player (born 1989)

Personal information
- Nationality: Chilean
- Born: 6 October 1989 (age 37)
- Height: 178 cm (70 in)
- Weight: 70 kg (154 lb)
- Spike: 290 cm (114 in)
- Block: 281 cm (111 in)

Volleyball information
- Number: 8 (national team)

Career
Years	Teams
2011	(Chile) Universidad Católica

National team
2011	Chile

Francisca Espejo (born 6 October 1989) is a retired Chilean female volleyball player. She was part of the Chile women's national volleyball team.

She participated at the 2011 Women's Pan-American Volleyball Cup. On club level she played for Universidad Católica in 2011.
