= Sebastián Silva (basketball) =

Chilean basketball player (born 1996)

Club Deportivo Universidad Católica
- Position: Power forward
- League: Liga Nacional de Básquetbol de Chile

Personal information
- Born: 12 March 1996 (age 30)
- Listed height: 2.00 m (6 ft 7 in)

Career information
- Playing career: 2016–present

Career history
- 2019–present: Club Deportivo Universidad Católica

Career highlights
- 1× LNB Centro - MVP

Sebastián "Titan" Silva Cerda (born 12 March 1996) is a Chilean professional basketball player for Club Deportivo Universidad Católica of the Liga Nacional de Básquetbol de Chile. Sebastián Silva is originally from Linares, Chile.

== National team ==
Silva played for Chile's national basketball team, both at junior and senior level. At the 2018 South American Games, where Chile competed with its under-25 team, Silva was part of the starting lineup in all games. He helped secure the bronze medal.
