= Carolina Azedo =

Brazilian volleyball player (born 1992)

Personal information
- Full name: Carolina Azedo Won-Held de Freitas
- Nationality: Brazilian
- Born: 17 January 1992 (age 34)
- Height: 183 cm (72 in)
- Weight: 79 kg (174 lb)
- Spike: 285 cm (112 in)
- Block: 282 cm (111 in)

Volleyball information
- Position: Outside hitter

National team
2010	Brazil

Carolina Azedo Won-Held de Freitas (born 17 January 1992) is a Brazilian retired volleyball player who played as an outside hitter. She was part of the Brazil women's national volleyball team.

She participated in the 2010 Women's Pan-American Volleyball Cup.
