= Cabbrini Foncette =

Trinidad and Tobago volleyball player (born 1989)

Personal information
- Nationality: Trinidad and Tobago
- Born: 19 July 1989 (age 37)
- Height: 186 cm (73 in)
- Spike: 304 cm (120 in)
- Block: 290 cm (114 in)

Volleyball information
- Number: 13 (national team)

National team
2011	Trinidad and Tobago

Cabbrini Foncette (born 19 July 1989) is a retired Trinidad and Tobago female volleyball player. She was part of the Trinidad and Tobago women's national volleyball team.

She participated in the 2010 Women's Pan-American Volleyball Cup.
