= Nicole Davis =

American volleyball player

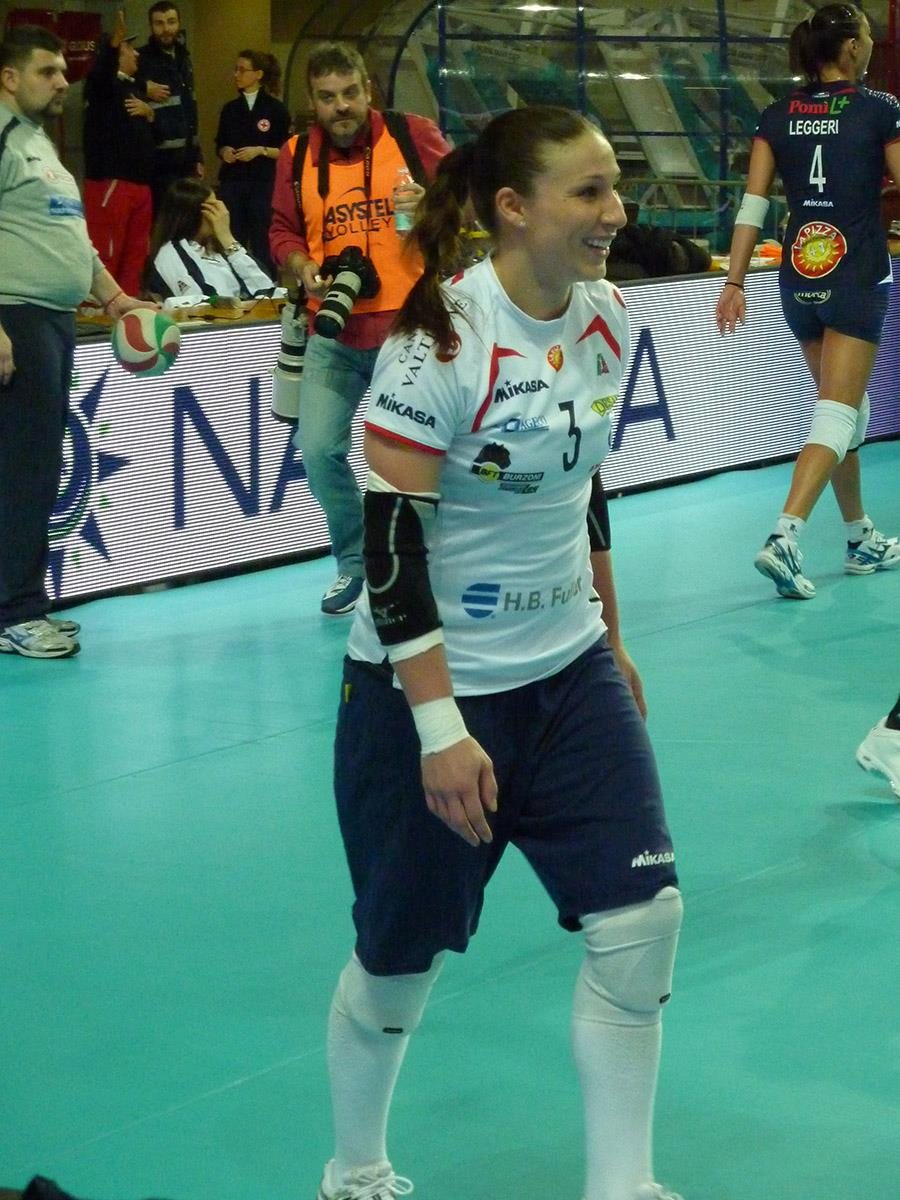

Personal information
- Full name: Nicole Marie Davis
- Born: April 24, 1982 (age 44); Stockton, California, U.S.
- Height: 5 ft 6 in (1.68 m)

Volleyball information
- Position: Libero
- Number: 6

National team
2005–2015	United States
Medal record
Women's volleyball
Representing the United States
Olympic Games
Silver medal – second place	2008 Beijing	Team
Silver medal – second place	2012 London	Team
World Championship
Gold medal – first place	2014 Italy	Team
World Cup
Silver medal – second place	2011 Japan	Team
Bronze medal – third place	2007 Japan	Team
FIVB World Grand Prix
Gold medal – first place	2010 Ningbo	Team
Gold medal – first place	2011 Macau	Team
Gold medal – first place	2012 Ningbo	Team
NORCECA Championship
Gold medal – first place	2005 Port of Spain
Gold medal – first place	2011 Caguas
Silver medal – second place	2007 Winnipeg
Pan-American Cup
Bronze medal – third place	2011 Ciudad Juárez
Final Four Cup
Silver medal – second place	2009 Lima

Nicole Marie Davis (born April 24, 1982) is a retired American indoor volleyball player and mindset coach at Finding Mastery, founded by Seattle Seahawks head coach Pete Carroll and high performance psychologist, Michael Gervais. Nicole last played professionally for Le Cannet Rocheville in France and retired in 2015. She is 5-foot-4-inch (163 cm) and played the libero position. She played for Fenerbahçe Women's Volleyball team for the 2007 season and wore the number 1 jersey. She was the first foreign-born libero to play in the Turkish league and led her team to a second-place finish. Davis represented the United States at the 2008 Olympics and 2012 Olympics, helping Team USA to a silver medal both times. She was also part of the US team that won the 2014 World Championships.

== High school and personal life ==
Davis was born in Stockton, California, to Randy and Barbara Davis. Her favorite sports team is the New York Yankees, her favorite movie is Dirty Dancing, her favorite TV show is Grey's Anatomy.

She graduated from Lincoln High School in Stockton in 2000. In her four years there, she was a three-year letter winner and played as an outside hitter and libero. As a senior, she earned All-San Joaquin League and All-Area honors. In her senior season, she had season totals of 357 kills, 569 digs, 35 aces and 40 blocks. Her high school total is 705 kills, 1,254 digs, 103 aces and 82 blocks. She helped her team to the NorCal championships in 1999 and 2000.

She played club volleyball for Nike Pacific and Delta Valley Volleyball Club, where she was named to the junior Olympic team in 1999 and 2000.

== USC ==
Davis was a political science major at the University of Southern California.

In her senior season in 2003, she dominated the libero position as she led USC to their second consecutive NCAA national championship. She started all 35 matches and averaged 4.25 digs per game - the second-best single season performance in program history. She finished her USC career with 1,093 total digs and a 3.09 digs per game average to rank sixth in both USC career record categories. She surpassed her own career high and set a new USC record for digs in a three-game match with 31 against Stanford. On December 13 against UCLA in the NCAA Regional Final, Davis tied her career mark and USC record by posting another 31-dig performance against the Bruins. She trained with the USA A2 Women's National Team in Lake Placid, New York, during the summer of 2003.

A successful moment in sports for her career was winning back-to-back NCAA Division I volleyball championships with USC in 2002 and 2003.

== International ==
Davis was also named "Best Libero" at the Montreux Volley Masters in 2011. She also took part as the starting libero for the U.S. National team at the 2008 and 2012 Olympic Games. Where the team won the silver medal in both games. In addition to winning the silver medal in 2012, she was also ranked 2nd best libero in terms of statistics.
