= Isabela da Silveira =

Brazilian volleyball player (born 1992)

Personal information
- Full name: Isabela da Silveira Paquiardi
- Nationality: Brazilian
- Born: 3 April 1992 (age 34)
- Height: 181 cm (71 in)
- Weight: 75 kg (165 lb)
- Spike: 288 cm (113 in)
- Block: 283 cm (111 in)

Volleyball information
- Position: outside hitter

National team
2010	Brazil

Isabela da Silveira Paquiardi (born 3 April 1992) is a retired Brazilian female volleyball player, playing as an outside hitter. She was part of the Brazil women's national volleyball team.

She participated in the 2010 Women's Pan-American Volleyball Cup.
