= Isidora Steinmetz =

Chilean volleyball player (born 1994)

Personal information
- Nationality: Chilean
- Born: 1 June 1994 (age 32)
- Height: 180 cm (71 in)
- Weight: 68 kg (150 lb)
- Spike: 280 cm (110 in)
- Block: 275 cm (108 in)

Volleyball information
- Number: 15 (national team)

National team
2011	Chile

Isidora Steinmetz (born 1 June 1994) is a Chilean female volleyball player. She is part of the Chile women's national volleyball team. She graduated as bachelor of psychology from Universidad de Los Andes.

She participated at the 2011 Women's Pan-American Volleyball Cup.
