= Jerónimo Espejo =

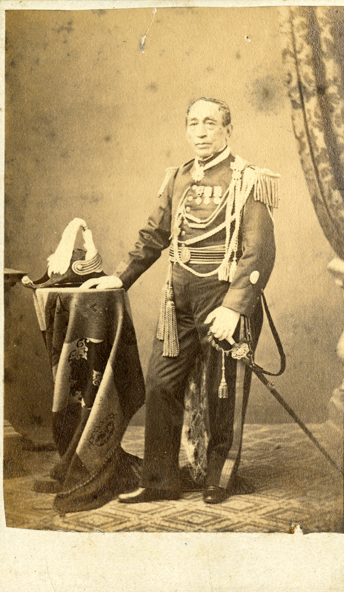
Jerónimo Espejo

Jerónimo Espejo (September 30, 1801 - February 18, 1889) was an Argentine general, enlisted in the Army of the Andes. He fought in the battles of Chacabuco, Cancha Rayada and Maipú. He also fought in the Battle of Ituzaingó, of the War with Brazil. He wrote historic essays about the campaign of the Army of the Andes, José de San Martín and Simón Bolívar. Those essays were consulted by Bartolomé Mitre to write the book Historia de San Martín y de la emancipación sudamericana.
