= Fernanda Kuchenbecker =

Brazilian volleyball player (born 1992)

Personal information
- Nationality: Brazilian
- Born: 24 January 1992 (age 34)
- Height: 184 cm (72 in)
- Weight: 60 kg (132 lb)
- Spike: 290 cm (114 in)
- Block: 285 cm (112 in)

Volleyball information
- Position: outside hitter

National team
- Years: Team
- 2010: Brazil

Fernanda Kuchenbecker (born 24 January 1992) is a Brazilian retired volleyball player who played as an outside hitter. She was part of the Brazil women's national volleyball team.

She participated at the 2010 Women's Pan-American Volleyball Cup.
