= Dani Espejo =

Spanish footballer

Personal information
- Full name: Daniel Espejo Guillén
- Date of birth: 23 July 1993 (age 33)
- Place of birth: Córdoba, Spain
- Height: 1.76 m (5 ft 9 in)
- Positions: Left back; winger

Team information
- Current team: Algeciras
- Number: 3

Youth career
- 2009–2012: Córdoba

Senior career*
Years	Team	Apps	(Gls)
2012–2014	Córdoba B	57	(6)
2013–2014	Córdoba	3	(0)
2014–2016	Atlético Madrid B	51	(2)
2016–2017	Sant Rafel	29	(2)
2017–2018	Ciudad Lucena	36	(2)
2018–2020	Linares	62	(8)
2020–	Algeciras	15	(0)
- * Club domestic league appearances and goals as of 21 March 2021

Daniel 'Dani' Espejo Guillén (born 23 July 1993) is a Spanish footballer who plays for Algeciras CF. Mainly a left back, he can also play as a left winger.

== Club career ==
Born in Córdoba, Andalusia, Espejo finished his formation with local Córdoba CF, making his senior debuts with the reserves in 2011. On 29 September 2013 he played his first official game with the first team, starting in a 2–0 home win over Girona FC in the Segunda División championship.

On 21 July 2014, Espejo joined another reserve team, Atlético Madrid B. He left the side in 2016, and subsequently represented Tercera División sides CF Sant Rafel, CD Ciudad de Lucena and Linares Deportivo.
