= Antonio Espejo =

Antonio Espejo may refer to:

- Antonio de Espejo (1540–1585), Spanish explorer
- Antonio Espejo (cyclist) (born 1968), Spanish racing cyclist
