= Isidora Santa María =

Chilean volleyball player (born 1993)

Personal information
- Nationality: Chilean
- Born: 11 March 1993 (age 33)
- Height: 162 cm (64 in)
- Weight: 55 kg (121 lb)
- Spike: 240 cm (94 in)
- Block: 230 cm (91 in)

Volleyball information
- Number: 2 (national team)

Career
Years	Teams
2011	(Chile) Club Vitavoley

National team
2011	Chile

Isidora Santa María (born 11 March 1993) is a retired Chilean female volleyball player. She was part of the Chile women's national volleyball team.

She participated at the 2011 Women's Pan-American Volleyball Cup. On club level she played for Club Vitavoley in 2011.
