= Ibarreta =

Coordinates: 25°13′S 59°51′W

- Interactive map of Ibarreta
- Country: Argentina
- Province: Formosa
- Time zone: UTC−3 (ART)
- Climate: Cfa

Ibarreta is a settlement in northern Argentina. It is located in Formosa Province.
