= Beatriz García =

Beatriz García may refer to:

- Beatriz García de Achá, Bolivian academic and politician
- Beatriz García (footballer) (Beatriz García Bernardo, born 1970), Spanish football player
- Beatriz García Vasallo, Spanish academic
- Beatriz García Vidagany (born 1988), Spanish tennis player
