= Ana Nieto =

Mexican volleyball player (born 1994)

Personal information
- Nationality: Mexican
- Born: 18 January 1994 (age 32)
- Height: 1.82 m (6 ft 0 in)
- Weight: 61 kg (134 lb)
- Spike: 298 cm (117 in)
- Block: 291 cm (115 in)
- Education: Jacksonville University

Volleyball information
- Position: Middle blocker
- Number: 4

Career
| Years | Teams |
|---|---|
| 2011-2018 | Jalisco |

Ana Nieto (born 18 January 1994) is a Mexican female volleyball player. She is a member of the Mexico women's national volleyball team and played for Jalisco in 2011.

She was part of the Mexico national team at the 2011 FIVB Volleyball Girls' U18 World Championship, and 2018 FIVB Volleyball Women's World Championship.

== Clubs ==
- Jalisco (2011)
