= Florencia Carlotto =

Argentine volleyball player (born 1988)

Florecia Carlotto

Personal information
- Nationality: Argentine
- Born: 14 October 1988 (age 38)
- Height: 171 cm (67 in)
- Weight: 72 kg (159 lb)
- Spike: 302 cm (119 in)
- Block: 291 cm (115 in)

Volleyball information
- Position: middle blocker
- Number: 14 (national team)

Career
Years	Teams
2011	(Argentina) CA Banco Nación

National team
2011	Argentina

Florencia Carlotto (born 14 October 1988) is a retired Argentine female volleyball player, playing as a c. She was part of the Argentina women's national volleyball team.

She participated in the 2011 Women's Pan American Volleyball championship. On club level she played for CA Banco Nación in 2011. She participated in the 2013 FIVB Volleyball World Grand Prix.
