= Gabriela Zazueta =

Mexican volleyball player (born 1994)

Personal information
- Nationality: Mexican
- Born: 5 September 1994 (age 32)
- Height: 173 cm (68 in)
- Weight: 67 kg (148 lb)
- Spike: 272 cm (107 in)
- Block: 264 cm (104 in)

Volleyball information
- Position: libero
- Number: 10 (national team)

National team
2010	Mexico

Gabriela Zazueta (born 5 September 1994) is a retired Mexican female volleyball player, playing as a libero. She was part of the Mexico women's national volleyball team.

She participated at the 2011 FIVB Volleyball Girls' U18 World Championship, and 2015 Universiade.
