= Antonela Curatola =

Argentine volleyball player (born 1991)

Personal information
- Full name: Antonela Ayelen Curatola
- Nationality: Argentine
- Born: 23 October 1991 (age 35)
- Height: 1.75 m (5 ft 9 in)
- Weight: 71 kg (157 lb)
- Spike: 290 cm (110 in)
- Block: 280 cm (110 in)

Volleyball information
- Number: 17

Career
Years	Teams
2014	Vélez Sarsfield

National team
Argentina

Antonela Ayelen Curatola (born 23 October 1991) is an Argentine volleyball player. She is a member of the Argentina women's national volleyball team.

She was part of the Argentine national team at the 2014 FIVB Volleyball Women's World Championship in Italy, and played for Vélez Sarsfield in 2014.

== Clubs ==
- (Argentina) Vélez Sarsfield (2014)
