= 2012 FIVB Volleyball World Grand Prix =

International women's volleyball tournament

2012 FIVB World Grand Prix
Tournament details
- Host country: China (Final)
- Dates: 8 June – 1 July
- Teams: 16
- Venue: 1 (in 1 host city)

Final positions
- Champions: United States (5th title)
- Runners-up: Brazil
- Third place: Turkey
- Fourth place: Thailand

Tournament awards
- MVP: Megan Hodge (USA)

The 2012 FIVB World Grand Prix was a women's volleyball tournament played by 16 countries starting 8 June 2012. The finals were held at the Beilun Sports and Arts Centre in Ningbo, China.

== Competing nations ==
=== Qualification process ===
Competition	Date	Venue	Vacancies	Qualified
Final Round Host	—	—	1	China
2011 Pan-American Cup	July 1–9, 2011	Ciudad Juarez, Mexico	2 (South America)^{[1]}	Brazil; Argentina
2011 Pan-American Cup	July 1–9, 2011	Ciudad Juarez, Mexico	4 (NORCECA)^{[1]}	Dominican Republic; United States; Cuba; Puerto Rico
2011 Asian Championship	September 15–23, 2011	Taipei, Chinese Taipei	3^{[2]}	Japan; South Korea; Thailand
2011 European Championship	Sep. 24 – Oct. 2, 2011	Serbia; Italy	5	Serbia; Germany; Turkey; Italy; Poland
Play-Off	October 5, 2011	Oran, Algeria	1^{[3]}	Chinese Taipei
Total			16	

- ^{[1]} The best two South American teams and the best 4 NORCECA teams at the 2011 Pan-American Cup qualified.
- ^{[2]} As China already qualified as host of the final round, the next best three teams at the 2011 Asian Championship qualified.
- ^{[3]} The best African team and the next best Asian team at the 2011 Asian Championship had a play-off to determine the final spot.

=== Play-off ===
- Venue: Palais des Sports, Oran, Algeria

Team 1	Agg.	Team 2	1st leg	2nd leg
Algeria	1–1	Chinese Taipei	0–3	3–0

Date	Time		Score		Set 1	Set 2	Set 3	Set 4	Set 5	Total	Report
27 Apr	14:06	Algeria	0–3	Chinese Taipei	19–25	24–26	20–25			63–76	P2 P3
28 Apr	14:00	Algeria	3–0	Chinese Taipei	25–23	25–23	25–19			75–65	P2 P3

Chinese Taipei won by total points of the two legs: 141–138.

== Pool standing procedure ==
1. Match points
2. Numbers of matches won
3. Sets ratio
4. Points ratio

Match won 3–0 or 3–1: 3 match points for the winner, 0 match points for the loser
Match won 3–2: 2 match points for the winner, 1 match point for the loser

== Calendar ==
Though FIVB did not officially release or confirm the pool schedule until April 2012, almost all continental divisions posted the pool schedule in December 2011. The original list was released December 19, 2011; three days later on December 22 a new list was released to the public, with 4 minor changes involving Brazil's, Dominican Republic's and Germany's pools. In April 2012, FIVB officially confirmed the pool schedule that had been released on December 22, 2011.

Week 1 8–10 June 2012
Group A: Macau, China	Group B: Santo Domingo, Dominican Republic	Group C: Busan, South Korea	Group D: Łódź, Poland
Puerto Rico; China; Thailand; Argentina	United States; Germany; Dominican Republic; Chinese Taipei	Japan; Cuba; South Korea; Turkey	Poland; Serbia; Italy; Brazil
Week 2 15–17 June 2012
Group E: São Bernardo do Campo, Brazil	Group F: Komaki, Japan	Group G: Foshan, China	Group H: Belgrade, Serbia
Brazil; Germany; Italy; United States	Japan; Dominican Republic; Thailand; Puerto Rico	Poland; China; Chinese Taipei; South Korea	Cuba; Serbia; Turkey; Argentina
Week 3 22–24 June 2012
Group I: Osaka, Japan	Group J: Bangkok, Thailand	Group K: Luohe, China	Group L: Taipei, Taiwan
Japan; Germany; South Korea; Turkey	United States; Serbia; Thailand; Argentina	Brazil; China; Cuba; Puerto Rico	Italy; Poland; Dominican Republic; Chinese Taipei
Week 4 Final round 27 June – 1st July 2012
Ningbo
China United States; Turkey; Thailand; Brazil; Cuba

== Preliminary round ==
=== Ranking ===
China (finals host) and the top five teams in the preliminary round would advance to the final round.

Pos	Team	Pld	W	L	Pts	SPW	SPL	SPR	SW	SL	SR	Qualification
1	United States	9	9	0	27	720	525	1.371	27	2	13.500	Final round
2	China	9	8	1	23	766	622	1.232	24	8	3.000	Hosts for the Final round
3	Turkey	9	7	2	21	808	738	1.095	23	12	1.917	Final round
4	Thailand	9	7	2	20	709	633	1.120	22	10	2.200	Final round
5	Brazil	9	8	1	19	873	774	1.128	25	14	1.786	Final round
6	Cuba	9	6	3	19	809	747	1.083	23	13	1.769	Final round
7	Germany	9	6	3	18	709	621	1.142	20	11	1.818	
8	Poland	9	5	4	16	789	740	1.066	20	15	1.333	
9	Japan	9	4	5	13	721	720	1.001	17	16	1.063	
10	Italy	9	4	5	13	773	772	1.001	16	19	0.842	
11	Serbia	9	3	6	11	720	750	0.960	15	19	0.789	
12	Dominican Republic	9	2	7	7	617	725	0.851	9	22	0.409	
13	Puerto Rico	9	2	7	5	608	751	0.810	8	24	0.333	
14	South Korea	9	1	8	4	673	798	0.843	8	25	0.320	
15	Argentina	9	0	9	0	584	759	0.769	4	27	0.148	
16	Chinese Taipei	9	0	9	0	542	746	0.727	3	27	0.111	

All times are local for the host city.

=== First round ===
==== Pool A ====
- Venue: Macau Forum, Macau, China

Date	Time		Score		Set 1	Set 2	Set 3	Set 4	Set 5	Total	Report
8 Jun	17:20	Argentina	0–3	Thailand	18–25	9–25	22–25			49–75	P2 P3
8 Jun	20:50	China	3–0	Puerto Rico	25–15	25–19	25–16			75–50	P2 P3
9 Jun	14:50	Puerto Rico	0–3	Thailand	21–25	20–25	22–25			63–75	P2 P3
9 Jun	17:20	Argentina	1–3	China	25–23	18–25	22–25	18–25		83–98	P2 P3
10 Jun	12:50	Argentina	1–3	Puerto Rico	20–25	16–25	25–16	17–25		78–91	P2 P3
10 Jun	15:20	China	3–1	Thailand	18–25	25–20	25–18	25–19		93–82	P2 P3

==== Pool B ====
- Venue: Palacio del Voleibol, Santo Domingo, Dominican Republic

Date	Time		Score		Set 1	Set 2	Set 3	Set 4	Set 5	Total	Report
8 Jun	17:00	Germany	1–3	United States	17–25	15–25	25–23	11–25		68–98	P2 P3
8 Jun	19:30	Dominican Republic	3–0	Chinese Taipei	25–23	25–19	25–18			75–60	P2 P3
9 Jun	17:00	United States	3–0	Chinese Taipei	25–10	25–22	25–12			75–44	P2 P3
9 Jun	19:30	Germany	3–0	Dominican Republic	25–16	25–18	25–19			75–53	P2 P3
10 Jun	14:30	Chinese Taipei	0–3	Germany	11–25	15–25	15–25			41–75	P2 P3
10 Jun	17:00	Dominican Republic	0–3	United States	18–25	19–25	15–25			52–75	P2 P3

==== Pool C ====
- Venue: Sajik Indoor Gymnasium, Busan, South Korea

Date	Time		Score		Set 1	Set 2	Set 3	Set 4	Set 5	Total	Report
8 Jun	14:00	Japan	0–3	Turkey	19–25	21–25	21–25			61–75	P2 P3
8 Jun	16:30	South Korea	2–3	Cuba	25–23	25–27	18–25	25–23	11–15	104–113	P2 P3
9 Jun	14:00	South Korea	1–3	Turkey	18–25	25–22	21–25	14–25		78–97	P2 P3
9 Jun	16:30	Japan	1–3	Cuba	20–25	25–20	18–25	20–25		83–95	P2 P3
10 Jun	14:00	South Korea	1–3	Japan	19–25	25–23	19–25	22–25		85–98	P2 P3
10 Jun	16:30	Cuba	3–1	Turkey	25–20	21–25	25–17	25–20		96–82	P2 P3

==== Pool D ====
- Venue: Atlas Arena, Łódź, Poland

Date	Time		Score		Set 1	Set 2	Set 3	Set 4	Set 5	Total	Report
8 Jun	17:30	Italy	2–3	Brazil	25–18	22–25	21–25	25–20	6–15	99–103	P2 P3
8 Jun	20:00	Poland	3–2	Serbia	24–26	25–22	20–25	25–16	15–10	109–99	P2 P3
9 Jun	12:30	Serbia	2–3	Brazil	25–21	18–25	23–25	25–23	5–15	96–109	P2 P3
9 Jun	15:00	Poland	1–3	Italy	22–25	25–23	20–25	29–31		96–104	P2 P3
10 Jun	17:30	Italy	0–3	Serbia	18–25	14–25	23–25			55–75	P2 P3
10 Jun	20:00	Poland	2–3	Brazil	15–25	13–25	25–23	25–22	10–15	88–110	P2 P3

=== Second round ===
==== Pool E ====
- Venue: Adib Moises Dib Gymnasium, São Bernardo do Campo, Brazil

Date	Time		Score		Set 1	Set 2	Set 3	Set 4	Set 5	Total	Report
15 Jun	18:20	Italy	0–3	United States	25–27	20–25	17–25			62–77	P2 P3
15 Jun	20:20	Brazil	3–1	Germany	18–25	25–14	25–18	26–24		94–81	P2 P3
16 Jun	18:20	United States	3–0	Germany	25–23	25–23	25–17			75–63	P2 P3
16 Jun	20:20	Brazil	3–2	Italy	26–24	14–25	25–15	24–26	16–14	105–104	P2 P3
17 Jun	13:20	Brazil	1–3	United States	25–20	18–25	18–25	23–25		84–95	P2 P3
17 Jun	15:20	Germany	3–0	Italy	30–28	25–13	26–24			81–65	P2 P3

==== Pool F ====
- Venue: Park Arena Komaki, Komaki, Japan

Date	Time		Score		Set 1	Set 2	Set 3	Set 4	Set 5	Total	Report
15 Jun	15:20	Thailand	3–1	Puerto Rico	25–18	19–25	25–11	25–19		94–73	P2 P3
15 Jun	18:20	Japan	3–0	Dominican Republic	25–17	25–13	25–18			75–48	P2 P3
16 Jun	15:20	Dominican Republic	0–3	Thailand	14–25	22–25	19–25			55–75	P2 P3
16 Jun	18:20	Japan	3–0	Puerto Rico	25–20	25–18	25–16			75–54	P2 P3
17 Jun	15:00	Dominican Republic	2–3	Puerto Rico	19–25	25–21	23–25	25–21	12–15	104–107	P2 P3
17 Jun	18:00	Japan	2–3	Thailand	15–25	25–16	25–22	19–25	16–18	100–106	P2 P3

==== Pool G ====
- Venue: Lingnan Pearl Gymnasium, Foshan, China

Date	Time		Score		Set 1	Set 2	Set 3	Set 4	Set 5	Total	Report
15 Jun	16:00	South Korea	0–3	Poland	17–25	16–25	22–25			55–75	P2 P3
15 Jun	19:30	China	3–0	Chinese Taipei	25–13	25–17	25–19			75–49	P2 P3
16 Jun	16:00	Chinese Taipei	0–3	Poland	10–25	24–26	19–25			53–76	P2 P3
16 Jun	19:30	China	3–0	South Korea	25–22	25–16	25–18			75–56	P2 P3
17 Jun	16:00	Chinese Taipei	1–3	South Korea	21–25	29–27	20–25	20–25		90–102	P2 P3
17 Jun	15:20	China	3–0	Poland	25–19	25–17	29–27			79–63	P2 P3

==== Pool H ====
- Venue: Hala Pionir, Belgrade, Serbia

Date	Time		Score		Set 1	Set 2	Set 3	Set 4	Set 5	Total	Report
15 Jun	17:20	Serbia	3–1	Argentina	25–23	23–25	25–22	25–17		98–87	P2 P3
15 Jun	20:05	Cuba	1–3	Turkey	16–25	25–20	20–25	20–25		81–95	P2 P3
16 Jun	17:20	Cuba	3–0	Serbia	25–14	25–15	25–17			75–46	P2 P3
16 Jun	20:05	Turkey	3–1	Argentina	25–15	25–20	21–25	25–15		96–75	P2 P3
17 Jun	17:20	Serbia	1–3	Turkey	21–25	25–16	22–25	21–25		89–91	P2 P3
17 Jun	20:05	Argentina	0–3	Cuba	16–25	19–25	19–25			54–75	P2 P3

=== Third round ===
==== Pool I ====
- Venue: Osaka Municipal Central Gymnasium, Osaka, Japan

Date	Time		Score		Set 1	Set 2	Set 3	Set 4	Set 5	Total	Report
22 Jun	15:20	South Korea	1–3	Turkey	18–25	26–28	25–20	13–25		82–98	P2 P3
22 Jun	18:20	Japan	1–3	Germany	22–25	12–25	25–17	16–25		75–92	P2 P3
23 Jun	15:20	Germany	3–0	South Korea	25–10	25–14	25–20			75–44	P2 P3
23 Jun	18:20	Japan	1–3	Turkey	25–23	14–25	21–25	17–25		77–98	P2 P3
24 Jun	15:00	Germany	3–1	Turkey	24–26	25–17	25–18	25–15		99–76	P2 P3
24 Jun	18:00	Japan	3–0	South Korea	25–22	25–20	27–25			77–67	P2 P3

==== Pool J ====
- Venue: Keelawes 1 Gymnasium, Thai-Japanese Stadium, Thai-Japanese Bangkok Youth Center, Dindaeng, Bangkok, Thailand

Date	Time		Score		Set 1	Set 2	Set 3	Set 4	Set 5	Total	Report
22 Jun	13:50	Serbia	0–3	United States	19–25	23–25	18–25			60–75	P2 P3
22 Jun	16:20	Thailand	3–0	Argentina	25–15	25–16	25–13			75–44	P2 P3
23 Jun	13:50	United States	3–0	Argentina	25–23	25–17	25–12			75–52	P2 P3
23 Jun	16:20	Serbia	1–3	Thailand	25–12	16–25	19–25	21–25		81–87	P2 P3
24 Jun	13:50	Argentina	0–3	Serbia	16–25	22–25	24–26			62–76	P2 P3
24 Jun	16:20	United States	3–0	Thailand	25–16	25–17	25–7			75–40	P2 P3

==== Pool K ====
- Venue: Luohe Sports Center, Luohe, China

Date	Time		Score		Set 1	Set 2	Set 3	Set 4	Set 5	Total	Report
22 Jun	16:00	China	3–1	Puerto Rico	25–16	25–27	25–11	25–13		100–67	P2 P3
22 Jun	19:30	Cuba	2–3	Brazil	31–29	18–25	19–25	26–24	8–15	102–118	P2 P3
23 Jun	16:00	China	3–2	Cuba	22–25	25–16	25–22	23–25	15–9	110–97	P2 P3
23 Jun	19:30	Puerto Rico	0–3	Brazil	17–25	12–25	19–25			48–75	P2 P3
24 Jun	16:00	Cuba	3–0	Puerto Rico	25–17	25–17	25–21			75–55	P2 P3
24 Jun	19:30	China	0–3	Brazil	20–25	22–25	19–25			61–75	P2 P3

==== Pool L ====
- Venue: Fengshan Stadium, Kaohsiung City, Chinese Taipei

Date	Time		Score		Set 1	Set 2	Set 3	Set 4	Set 5	Total	Report
22 Jun	16:00	Italy	3–1	Dominican Republic	25–20	25–17	25–27	25–21		100–85	P2 P3
22 Jun	19:30	Chinese Taipei	1–3	Poland	16–25	25–22	20–25	21–25		82–97	P2 P3
23 Jun	16:00	Chinese Taipei	0–3	Italy	10–25	13–25	17–25			40–75	P2 P3
23 Jun	19:30	Poland	3–0	Dominican Republic	25–16	25–19	25–14			75–49	P2 P3
24 Jun	16:00	Chinese Taipei	1–3	Dominican Republic	18–25	25–21	18–25	22–25		83–96	P2 P3
24 Jun	19:30	Italy	3–2	Poland	23–25	20–25	26–24	25–22	15–13	109–109	P2 P3

== Final round ==
=== Final ranking ===
Pos	Team	Pld	W	L	Pts	SPW	SPL	SPR	SW	SL	SR
1	United States	5	5	0	10	443	396	1.119	15	4	3.750
2	Brazil	5	4	1	9	446	362	1.232	14	5	2.800
3	Turkey	5	3	2	8	437	430	1.016	11	8	1.375
4	Thailand	5	2	3	7	431	456	0.945	8	11	0.727
5	China	5	1	4	6	437	450	0.971	7	12	0.583
6	Cuba	5	0	5	5	281	381	0.738	0	15	0.000

=== Pool final ===
- Venue: Beilun Gymnasium, Ningbo, China

Date	Time		Score		Set 1	Set 2	Set 3	Set 4	Set 5	Total	Report
27 Jun	13:00	Brazil	2–3	United States	19–25	20–25	25–20	25–13	13–15	102–98	P2 P3
27 Jun	15:30	Thailand	1–3	Turkey	22–25	21–25	25–20	24–26		92–96	P2 P3
27 Jun	19:30	China	3–0	Cuba	25–22	25–22	25–17			75–61	P2 P3
28 Jun	13:00	United States	3–1	Thailand	25–18	27–25	18–25	25–18		95–86	P2 P3
28 Jun	15:30	Cuba	0–3	Turkey	23–25	9–25	20–25			52–75	P2 P3
28 Jun	19:30	China	1–3	Brazil	21–25	25–21	19–25	18–25		83–96	P2 P3
29 Jun	13:00	Brazil	3–0	Cuba	25–17	25–12	25–14			75–43	P2 P3
29 Jun	15:30	Turkey	1–3	United States	18–25	23–25	25–21	20–25		86–96	P2 P3
29 Jun	19:30	China	2–3	Thailand	25–21	22–25	32–34	25–21	13–15	117–116	P2 P3
30 Jun	13:00	Brazil	3–0	Thailand	25–20	25–23	25–14			75–57	P2 P3
30 Jun	15:30	Cuba	0–3	United States	14–25	24–26	14–25			52–76	P2 P3
30 Jun	19:30	China	1–3	Turkey	26–24	22–25	23–25	21–25		92–99	P2 P3
1 Jul	13:00	Turkey	1–3	Brazil	21–25	25–23	20–25	15–25		81–98	P2 P3
1 Jul	15:30	Thailand	3–0	Cuba	25–22	30–28	25–23			80–73	P2 P3
1 Jul	19:30	China	0–3	United States	24–26	21–25	25–27			70–78	P2 P3

- All times are local for the host city.

== Final standing ==
Rank	Team
1st place, gold medalist(s)	United States
2nd place, silver medalist(s)	Brazil
3rd place, bronze medalist(s)	Turkey
4	Thailand
5	China
6	Cuba
7	Germany
8	Poland
9	Japan
10	Italy
11	Serbia
12	Dominican Republic
13	Puerto Rico
14	South Korea
15	Argentina
16	Chinese Taipei

2012 FIVB World Grand Prix winners

United States
Fifth title

Team roster:
Alisha Glass, Danielle Scott-Arruda, Tayyiba Haneef-Park, Nicole Davis, Heather Bown, Cynthia Barboza, Nancy Metcalf, Christa Harmotto, Megan Hodge, Tamari Miyashiro, Courtney Thompson, Kristin Richards.
Head coach: Hugh McCutcheon

== Individual awards ==
- Most valuable player:
  - Megan Hodge (USA)
- Best scorer:
  - Megan Hodge (USA)
- Best spiker:
  - Yoana Palacios (CUB)
- Best blocker:
  - Thaísa Menezes (BRA)
- Best server:
  - Neslihan Darnel (TUR)
- Best receiver:
  - Gülden Kayalar (TUR)
- Best setter:
  - Nootsara Tomkom (THA)
- Best digger:
  - Zhang Xian (CHN)
- Best libero:
  - Zhang Xian (CHN)
