= Club Deportivo Universidad Católica (sports club) =

Club Deportivo Universidad Católica
Founded	21 April 1937
Infrastructure	Claro Arena; Edificio de Deportes UC
President	Francisco Urrejola
Branches	Basketball; Horsemanship; Football; Field Hockey; Swimming; Rugby; Ski; Tennis; Triathlon; Volleyball

The Club Deportivo Universidad Católica is a multi-sports organization from Chile representing the Pontificia Universidad Católica de Chile that puts together 14 sport branches, being the most famous football branch. The club has the best infrastructure in the country and has the most sports branches than any other club. Until the soccer branch became independent a few years ago, it was this branch that shared its earnings with the other branches, allowing them to survive and succeed. However, these actions prevented the soccer club from reinvesting and competing aggressively at the domestic and international level, where there are other clubs with bigger budgets and funds to invest in players.

Since its foundation, the colors that identify the team are the white and the blue. While in their club's logo you can see these same colors with red, besides representing it with a cross, showing the club's Catholic character.

== History ==
The club's foundation was in 1908. Even though the sports activities in the university began years before, the idea from Raúl Agüero in 1925 to gather sports activities from the university under the same name was the beginning of the formation of what became the Club Deportivo Universidad Católica. This way, it began to act as an organized identity and totally dependent on the university on 30 August 1927, when the then director, Monseñor Carlos Casanueva obtained the permits to use Campos de Sports de Ñuñoa for the sporting activities of the university.

It began its participation in the University Confederation of sports in 1928, participating together with the Universidad de Concepción, the Universidad Católica de Valparaíso and the Universidad de Chile.

On 19 April 1937 the university joins the Chilean Football Association. Because of this, a group of students from the university, got together in a house of studies in Santiago de Chile on 21 April 1937 to discuss the organization of the club. This would become the official date of the foundation.

The football branch made its official debut on 13 June 1937 in the then Segunda División of Chilean professional football, in a game against Universidad de Chile, the longtime rival of the club, in the military stadium.

In the beginning part of the 1980s, it began the migration of some sporting branches to the Sporting complex named San Carlos de Apoquindo.

== Presidents of the Club ==
CDUC

- 1937–1938: Augusto Gómez Soto
- 1939–1946: Jimmy Rasmusen Bowden
- 1947–1949: Óscar Álvarez Lon
- 1950–1951: Enrique Casorzo Federici
- 1952–1953: Alejandro Duque Lagos
- 1953–1954: Carlos Dittborn Pinto
- 1954–1955: Sergio Urrejola Rozas
- 1955–1956: Enrique Casorzo Federici
- 1957–1965: Eduardo Cuevas Valdés
- 1966–1967: Enrique Casorzo Federici
- 1968–1974: Manuel Vélez Samaniego
- 1975–1976: Raúl Devés Jullian
- 1976–1977: José Martínez Guichou
- 1978–1982: Germán Mayo Correa
- 1982–1993: Alfonso Swett Saavedra
- 1994–1996: Jorge Claro Mimica
- 1996–1998: Manuel Vélez Samaniego
- 1999–2009: Jorge O´Ryan Schütz

Cruzados SADP

- 2009-2014: Jaime Estévez Valencia
- 2014-2016: Luis Larraín Arroyo
- 2016-Present: Juan Tagle Quiroz

== Branches ==
=== Football ===
The football section of Sports Club Universidad Católica is one of the institution’s prominent branches and one of Chile’s popular teams. The team is considered one of the three "great ones" from Chile, together with Colo-Colo and Universidad de Chile.

=== Basketball ===
Club Deportivo Universidad Católica Básquetbol
- Leagues: Liga Nacional
- Founded: 1937
- Arena: Edificio de Deportes UC (1,300 spectators)
- Location: Santiago, Chile
- Team colors: Blue, White
- President: José Manuél Vélez
- Head coach: Miguel Ureta
- Championships: 5 Dimayor; 2 Libcentro; 1 Apertura Dimayor
- Website: Official website
Home	Away

The basketball branch of the club currently competes in the Liga Nacional de Básquetbol de Chile, being the most successful team of Chilean basketball history, having won the old professional top-level Dimayor League five times.

The home arena of the team is the Estadio Palestino, located in Las Condes, Santiago. The team former home arena was the Santa Rosa de Las Condes arena, until the club sold it in 2009.

The youth team of the club also plays the international tournament Campioni del Domani which they have won six times.

The historic performance in the middle of the 1980s where they won a record four titles in a row, made the team "catolico" as the team with most wins in the league history. They also won the title in 2005, with the leadership of Miguel Ureta.

==== Current roster ====
Note: Flags indicate national team eligibility at FIBA-sanctioned events. Players may hold other non-FIBA nationalities not displayed.

Club Deportivo Universidad Católica roster
Players
Coaches

Pos.	No.	Nat.	Name
G	0	(Chile)	Manuel Barrientos
G	2	(Chile)	Ramon Gatica
G/F	3	(Argentina)	Juan Emiliano Fernandez
G	5	(Chile)	Juan Dlugossewski
G	7	(Chile)	Sebastian Contreras
PF	8	(United States)	Scott Cutley
G	10	(Chile)	Vicente Damianovic
PF	17	(Chile)	Sebastián Silva
F	21	(United States)	Steffphon Pettigrew
G	22	(United States)	Ray Bowles
G	24	(United States)	D.J. Ursery
C	26	(Venezuela)	Jose Juan Bravo
C	35	(Chile)	Aitor Pickett

Head coach

- Vacant

Legend

- (C) Team captain
- Injured

- Roster
Updated: 6 April 2020

==== Trophies ====
- Dimayor: 5
  - 1983, 1984, 1985, 1986, 2005
- Dimayor Apertura: 1
  - 1989
- Libcentro: 2
  - 2003, 2004

==== Notable players ====
To appear in this section a player must have either:
- Set a club record or won an individual award as a professional player.
- Played at least one official international match for his senior national team.

- (Chile) Pablo Coro
- (Chile) Sebastian Silva
- (United States) Faron Hand
- (United States) Maurice Spillers
- (United States) John Woods

=== Rugby ===
It is one of the most important teams of Rugby in Chile, having won the national tournament 18 times. For the rugby sports branch, their pants are black in both the official uniform and the alternative.

==== National tournaments ====
- Campeonato Central de Rugby: (20): 1949, 1964, 1965, 1975, 1987, 1988, 1989, 1990, 1992, 1995, 1996, 1997, 1998, 1999, 2002, 2003, 2004, 2006, 2009, 2019
- Torneo de Apertura: (10): 1989, 1991, 1994, 1997, 2004, 2005, 2007, 2009, 2013, 2015

=== Volleyball ===
This Branch was born in 1942 together with the Chilean Volleyball Association. The participation of José Grisante, sportsman of the club and vice president of the Association that was chaired by Benedicto Kocian of the YMCA, is key in this process.

In 1943, the association was renamed the Santiago Volleyball Association, and in 1955, the Chilean Volleyball Federation was founded. Jose Grisanti was appointed president and Francisco Vilarrubias vice president, both of whom were CDUC volleyball players. Both the men's and women's teams have won national championships.

==== National tournaments ====
- Liga Nacional de Voleibol (men): (1): 2004
- Liga Nacional de Voleibol (women): (3): 2004, 2005, 2006
- SuperVolei (Federación de Vóleibol de Chile) (women): (1): 2008
- Copa Providencia (women): (1): 2008

=== Field Hockey ===
- Liga Nacional de Hockey (men): (1): Apertura 2006

=== Ski ===
The branch of ski of the sports club Universidad Católica was founded in 1942 because of the initiative of a group of students from the Pontificia Universidad Católica de Chile.

== Anthem ==
Its lyrics were written by Pedro Fornazzari, Charles Bown and Alberto Buccicardi, the two last were ex players from the club and directors of the magazine revista Estadio.

Emulating the melody used by the supporters of the British club Manchester United, they gave birth to the Anthem of the institution, immortalizing the phrase "Por la Patria, Dios y la Universidad", which translates to "For the country, God and the University".

== Sports accommodation ==
Universidad Católica has owned four stadiums: Estadio Universidad Católica, located in the Maestranza and Marcoleta sector; Campos de Sports de Ñuñoa, which already had an extensive history in Chilean sports; Estadio Independencia, located in the homonymous commune of Santiago and inaugurated on October 12, 1945; and San Carlos de Apoquindo.
