= 2010 Women's Pan-American Volleyball Cup =

Tournament details
- Host country: Mexico
- Dates: 18–26 June 2010
- Teams: 11
- Venues: 2 (in 2 host cities)

Final positions
- Champions: Dominican Republic (2nd title)

Tournament awards
- MVP: Prisilla Rivera (DOM)

The 2010 Women's Pan-American Volleyball Cup was the ninth edition of the annual women's volleyball tournament, played by eleven countries from 18 to 26 June 2010 in Rosarito and Tijuana, Mexico. The intercontinental event served as a qualifier for the 2011 FIVB World Grand Prix and 2010 Final Four.

== Competing nations ==
Group A	Group B
Argentina; Brazil; Canada; Cuba; Dominican Republic; Venezuela (withdrew)	Costa Rica; Mexico; Peru; Puerto Rico; Trinidad and Tobago; United States

== Preliminary round ==
=== Group A ===
Pos	Team	Pld	W	L	Pts	SW	SL	SR	SPW	SPL	SPR	Qualification
1	Cuba	4	4	0	8	12	5	2.400	411	367	1.120	Semifinals
2	Dominican Republic	4	3	1	7	11	6	1.833	402	367	1.095	Quarterfinals
3	Argentina	4	2	2	6	8	8	1.000	353	354	0.997	Quarterfinals
4	Brazil	4	1	3	5	5	9	0.556	297	334	0.889	Classification matches
5	Canada	4	0	4	4	4	12	0.333	337	378	0.892	Classification matches

Date		Score		Set 1	Set 2	Set 3	Set 4	Set 5	Total	Report
18 Jun	Canada	2–3	Argentina	25–22	20–25	22–25	25–19	11–15	103–106	Report
18 Jun	Cuba	3–1	Brazil	27–25	23–25	25–17	25–21		100–88	Report
19 Jun	Brazil	1–3	Dominican Republic	14–25	25–16	19–25	23–25		81–91	Report
19 Jun	Cuba	3–1	Canada	21–25	25–19	25–21	25–19		96–84	Report
20 Jun	Brazil	0–3	Argentina	13–25	15–25	22–25			50–75	Report
20 Jun	Dominican Republic	2–3	Cuba	29–31	25–23	19–25	25–23	12–15	110–117	Report
20 Jun	Canada	0–3	Brazil	21–25	26–28	21–25			68–78	Report
20 Jun	Argentina	1–3	Dominican Republic	14–25	25–27	28–26	20–25		87–103	Report
21 Jun	Dominican Republic	3–1	Canada	23–25	25–20	25–23	25–14		98–82	Report
21 Jun	Cuba	3–1	Argentina	23–25	25–23	25–15	25–22		98–85	Report

=== Group B ===
Pos	Team	Pld	W	L	Pts	SW	SL	SR	SPW	SPL	SPR	Qualification
1	United States	5	5	0	10	15	0	MAX	377	213	1.770	Semifinals
2	Peru	5	4	1	9	12	3	4.000	364	258	1.411	Quarterfinals
3	Puerto Rico	5	3	2	8	9	6	1.500	326	303	1.076	Quarterfinals
4	Trinidad and Tobago	5	2	3	7	6	9	0.667	298	342	0.871	Classification matches
5	Mexico	5	1	4	6	3	13	0.231	290	370	0.784	Classification matches
6	Costa Rica	5	0	5	5	1	15	0.067	221	390	0.567	

Date		Score		Set 1	Set 2	Set 3	Set 4	Set 5	Total	Report
18 Jun	Peru	0–3	United States	25–27	22–25	17–25			64–77	Report
18 Jun	Puerto Rico	3–0	Costa Rica	25–13	25–15	25–19			75–47	Report
18 Jun	Mexico	0–3	Trinidad and Tobago	21–25	15–25	23–25			59–75	Report
19 Jun	United States	3–0	Puerto Rico	25–13	25–17	25–14			75–47	Report
19 Jun	Costa Rica	0–3	Trinidad and Tobago	15–25	22–25	21–25			58–75	Report
19 Jun	Peru	3–0	Mexico	25–17	25–7	25–21			75–45	Report
20 Jun	Puerto Rico	0–3	Peru	21–25	22–25	14–25			57–75	Report
20 Jun	United States	3–0	Trinidad and Tobago	25–17	25–9	25–11			75–37	Report
20 Jun	Costa Rica	1–3	Mexico	17–25	25–15	14–25	14–25		70–90	Report
21 Jun	Trinidad and Tobago	0–3	Peru	18–25	23–25	15–25			56–75	Report
21 Jun	United States	3–0	Costa Rica	25–11	25–10	25–2			75–23	Report
21 Jun	Mexico	0–3	Puerto Rico	22–25	14–25	15–25			51–75	Report
22 Jun	Costa Rica	0–3	Peru	7–25	7–25	9–25			23–75	Report
22 Jun	Puerto Rico	3–0	Trinidad and Tobago	25–18	25–19	25–18			75–55	Report
22 Jun	United States	3–0	Mexico	25–14	25–16	25–15			75–45	Report

== Final round ==
=== Championship bracket ===
Quarterfinals
B2	Peru	3
A3	Argentina	1
A2	Dominican Republic	3
B3	Puerto Rico	0

Semifinals
A1	Cuba	0
B2	Peru	3
B1	United States	1
A2	Dominican Republic	3

Finals
B2	Peru	0
A2	Dominican Republic	3
Third place
A1	Cuba	0
B1	United States	3

=== 5th–10th places bracket ===
Classification 5–10
B4	Trinidad and Tobago	0
A5	Canada	3
A4	Brazil	3
B5	Mexico	0

Classification 5–8
A3	Argentina	3
A5	Canada	2
B3	Puerto Rico	3
A4	Brazil	2
Classification 9–10
B5	Mexico	3
B4	Trinidad and Tobago	1

Classification 5–6
A3	Argentina	3
B3	Puerto Rico	0
Classification 7–8
A5	Canada	3
A4	Brazil	1

=== Classification 5–10 ===
Date		Score		Set 1	Set 2	Set 3	Set 4	Set 5	Total	Report
24 Jun	Trinidad and Tobago	0–3	Canada	19–25	18–25	15–25			52–75	Report
24 Jun	Mexico	0–3	Brazil	11–25	10–25	23–25			44–75	Report

=== Quarterfinals ===
Date		Score		Set 1	Set 2	Set 3	Set 4	Set 5	Total	Report
24 Jun	Dominican Republic	3–0	Puerto Rico	25–21	25–23	25–23			75–67	Report
24 Jun	Peru	3–1	Argentina	16–25	25–17	25–18	25–21		91–81	Report

=== Classification 9 ===
Date		Score		Set 1	Set 2	Set 3	Set 4	Set 5	Total	Report
25 Jun	Mexico	3–1	Trinidad and Tobago	25–21	18–25	25–21	26–24		94–91	Report

=== Classification 5–8 ===
Date		Score		Set 1	Set 2	Set 3	Set 4	Set 5	Total	Report
25 Jun	Puerto Rico	3–2	Brazil	25–21	19–25	25–22	17–25	15–12	101–105	Report
25 Jun	Canada	2–3	Argentina	20–25	22–25	25–21	25–23	8–15	100–109	Report

=== Semifinals ===
Date		Score		Set 1	Set 2	Set 3	Set 4	Set 5	Total	Report
25 Jun	Cuba	0–3	Peru	18–25	23–25	23–25			64–75	Report
25 Jun	United States	1–3	Dominican Republic	25–22	23–25	22–25	16–25		86–97	Report

=== Classification 7–8, 5–6 ===
Date		Score		Set 1	Set 2	Set 3	Set 4	Set 5	Total	Report
26 Jun	Brazil	1–3	Canada	18–25	25–11	14–25	22–25		65–86	Report
26 Jun	Argentina	3–0	Puerto Rico	25–23	25–21	25–16			75–60	Report

=== Finals ===
Date		Score		Set 1	Set 2	Set 3	Set 4	Set 5	Total	Report
26 Jun	United States	3–0	Cuba	25–15	25–20	25–17			75–52	Report
26 Jun	Dominican Republic	3–0	Peru	25–17	30–28	25–22			80–67	Report

== Final ranking ==
Rank	Team
1st place, gold medalist(s)	Dominican Republic
2nd place, silver medalist(s)	Peru
3rd place, bronze medalist(s)	United States
4	Cuba
5	Argentina
6	Puerto Rico
7	Canada
8	Brazil
9	Mexico
10	Trinidad and Tobago
11	Costa Rica

2010 Women's Pan-American Cup winners

Dominican Republic
2nd title

- Dominican Republic, Peru, the United States, Cuba, Argentina and Brazil qualified for the 2011 FIVB World Grand Prix.
- Dominican Republic, Peru and Argentina qualified along with Mexico for the 2010 Final Four.

== Individual awards ==
- Most valuable player
  - Prisilla Rivera (DOM)
- Best scorer
  - Kenia Carcaces (CUB)
- Best spiker
  - Sarai Álvarez (PUR)
- Best blocker
  - Lisvel Elisa Eve (DOM)
- Best server
  - Kelly-Anne Billingy (TRI)
- Best digger
  - Brenda Castillo (DOM)
- Best setter
  - Elena Keldibekova (PER)
- Best receiver
  - Brenda Castillo (DOM)
- Best libero
  - Brenda Castillo (DOM)
