= 2011 Women's Pan-American Volleyball Cup =

Tournament details
- Host country: Mexico
- Dates: July 1–9, 2011
- Teams: 12
- Venues: 2 (in Ciudad Juárez host cities)

Final positions
- Champions: Brazil (3rd title)

Tournament awards
- MVP: Sheilla Castro (BRA)

The 2011 Pan-American Volleyball Cup was the tenth edition of the annual women's volleyball tournament, played by twelve countries over July 1–9, 2011 in Ciudad Juárez, Chihuahua, Mexico. The top four NORCECA teams and the top two from CSV confederation, qualified for the 2012 FIVB World Grand Prix.

== Competing nations ==
Group A	Group B
Argentina; Canada; Chile; Cuba; Dominican Republic; Mexico	Brazil; Costa Rica; Peru; Puerto Rico; Trinidad and Tobago; United States

== Preliminary round ==
=== Group A ===
Pos	Team	Pld	W	L	Pts	SPW	SPL	SPR	SW	SL	SR	Qualification
1	Dominican Republic	5	5	0	15	403	308	1.308	15	1	15.000	Semifinals
2	Cuba	5	4	1	12	426	325	1.311	13	4	3.250	Quarterfinals
3	Argentina	5	3	2	9	390	370	1.054	10	7	1.429	Quarterfinals
4	Canada	5	2	3	6	341	339	1.006	7	9	0.778	
5	Mexico	5	1	4	3	289	356	0.812	3	12	0.250	
6	Chile	5	0	5	0	224	375	0.597	0	15	0.000	

Date	Time		Score		Set 1	Set 2	Set 3	Set 4	Set 5	Total	Report
1 July	15:00	Cuba	3–1	Argentina	27–29	25–19	25–13	25–20		102–81	P2
1 July	17:00	Dominican Republic	3–0	Canada	25–23	25–15	25–13			75–51	P2
1 July	20:00	Chile	0–3	Mexico	22–25	19–25	15–25			56–75	P2
2 July	16:00	Dominican Republic	3–0	Chile	25–13	25–9	25–20			75–42	P2
2 July	18:00	Canada	1–3	Argentina	15–25	23–25	25–21	24–26		87–97	P2
2 July	20:00	Cuba	3–0	Mexico	25–20	25–15	25–19			75–54	P2
3 July	16:00	Cuba	3–0	Chile	25–10	25–10	25–14			75–34	P2
3 July	18:00	Dominican Republic	3–0	Argentina	25–23	25–20	25–19			75–62	P2
3 July	20:00	Canada	3–0	Mexico	25–18	25–15	25–18			75–51	P2
4 July	16:00	Argentina	3–0	Chile	25–21	25–15	25–15			75–51	P2
4 July	18:00	Cuba	3–0	Canada	25–13	25–18	25–22			75–53	P2
4 July	20:00	Dominican Republic	3–0	Mexico	25–20	25–19	25–15			75–54	P2
5 July	16:00	Canada	3–0	Chile	25–19	25–12	25–10			75–41	P2
5 July	18:00	Cuba	1–3	Dominican Republic	25–18	33–35	20–25	21–25		99–103	P2
5 July	20:00	Argentina	3–0	Mexico	25–18	25–23	25–14			75–55	P2

=== Group B ===
Pos	Team	Pld	W	L	Pts	SPW	SPL	SPR	SW	SL	SR	Qualification
1	Brazil	5	5	0	14	410	289	1.419	15	2	7.500	Semifinals
2	United States	5	4	1	13	403	293	1.375	14	3	4.667	Quarterfinals
3	Puerto Rico	5	3	2	9	359	330	1.088	9	7	1.286	Quarterfinals
4	Peru	5	2	3	6	337	370	0.911	7	9	0.778	
5	Trinidad and Tobago	5	1	4	3	279	362	0.771	3	12	0.250	
6	Costa Rica	5	0	5	0	232	376	0.617	0	15	0.000	

Date	Time		Score		Set 1	Set 2	Set 3	Set 4	Set 5	Total	Report
1 July	12:00	Puerto Rico	3–0	Costa Rica	25–10	25–13	25–21			75–44	P2
1 July	14:00	Brazil	3–0	Trinidad and Tobago	25–15	25–12	25–18			75–45	P2
1 July	16:00	United States	3–0	Peru	25–20	25–14	25–14			75–48	P2
2 July	16:00	Peru	3–0	Trinidad and Tobago	25–15	25–17	29–27			79–59	P2
2 July	18:00	Brazil	3–0	Costa Rica	25–15	25–12	25–10			75–37	P2
2 July	20:00	United States	3–0	Puerto Rico	25–17	25–17	25–17			75–51	P2
3 July	16:00	Peru	3–0	Costa Rica	25–19	25–12	26–24			76–55	P2
3 July	18:00	United States	3–0	Trinidad and Tobago	25–11	25–17	25–18			75–46	P2
3 July	20:00	Brazil	3–0	Puerto Rico	25–21	25–21	25–10			75–52	P2
4 July	16:00	Puerto Rico	3–0	Trinidad and Tobago	25–16	25–20	25–18			75–54	P2
4 July	18:00	Brazil	3–0	Peru	25–11	25–18	25–23			75–52	P2
4 July	20:00	United States	3–0	Costa Rica	25–20	25–10	25–8			75–38	P2
5 July	16:00	Costa Rica	0–3	Trinidad and Tobago	21–25	15–25	22–25			58–75	P2
5 July	18:00	Peru	1–3	Puerto Rico	15–25	21–25	33–31	13–25		82–106	P2
5 July	20:00	Brazil	3–2	United States	28–30	25–18	25–19	17–25	15–11	110–103	P2

== Final round ==
=== Championship bracket ===
Quarterfinals
B2	United States	3
A3	Argentina	0
A2	Cuba	3
B3	Puerto Rico	0

Semifinals
A1	Dominican Republic	3
B2	United States	1
B1	Brazil	3
A2	Cuba	1

Finals
A1	Dominican Republic	0
B1	Brazil	3
Third place
B2	United States	3
A2	Cuba	0

=== 5th–10th places bracket ===
Classification 5–10
B4	Peru	3
A5	Mexico	0
A4	Canada	3
B5	Trinidad and Tobago	0

Classification 5–8
A3	Argentina	3
B4	Peru	2
B3	Puerto Rico	3
A4	Canada	1
Classification 9–10
A5	Mexico	3
B5	Trinidad and Tobago	1

Classification 5–6
A3	Argentina	2
B3	Puerto Rico	3
Classification 7–8
B4	Peru	0
A4	Canada	3

=== Eleventh place match ===
Date	Time		Score		Set 1	Set 2	Set 3	Set 4	Set 5	Total	Report
7 July	16:00	Chile	0–3	Costa Rica	16–25	20–25	17–25			53–75	P2

=== Classification 7–10 ===
Date	Time		Score		Set 1	Set 2	Set 3	Set 4	Set 5	Total	Report
7 July	18:00	Canada	3–0	Trinidad and Tobago	25–15	25–19	25–17			75–51	P2
7 July	20:00	Peru	3–0	Mexico	25–23	25–23	25–22			75–68	P2

=== Quarterfinals ===
Date	Time		Score		Set 1	Set 2	Set 3	Set 4	Set 5	Total	Report
7 July	18:00	Cuba	3–0	Puerto Rico	26–24	25–19	25–14			76–57	P2
7 July	20:00	United States	3–0	Argentina	25–13	25–14	25–19			75–46	P2

=== Ninth place match ===
Date	Time		Score		Set 1	Set 2	Set 3	Set 4	Set 5	Total	Report
8 July	16:00	Mexico	3–1	Trinidad and Tobago	25–18	25–16	14–25	25–19		89–78	P2

=== Classification 5–8 ===
Date	Time		Score		Set 1	Set 2	Set 3	Set 4	Set 5	Total	Report
8 July	18:00	Argentina	3–2	Peru	25–19	15–25	26–24	22–25	15–12	103–105	P2
8 July	20:00	Puerto Rico	3–1	Canada	25–19	25–14	24–26	25–16		99–75	P2

=== Semifinals ===
Date	Time		Score		Set 1	Set 2	Set 3	Set 4	Set 5	Total	Report
8 July	18:00	Brazil	3–1	Cuba	25–19	25–14	26–28	25–15		101–76	P2
8 July	20:00	Dominican Republic	3–1	United States	21–25	25–19	25–21	25–21		96–86	P2

=== Seventh place match ===
Date	Time		Score		Set 1	Set 2	Set 3	Set 4	Set 5	Total	Report
9 July	14:00	Peru	0–3	Canada	21–25	22–25	19–25			62–75	P2

=== Fifth place match ===
Date	Time		Score		Set 1	Set 2	Set 3	Set 4	Set 5	Total	Report
9 July	16:00	Argentina	2–3	Puerto Rico	25–23	25–21	23–25	21–25	13–15	107–109	P2

=== Third place match ===
Date	Time		Score		Set 1	Set 2	Set 3	Set 4	Set 5	Total	Report
9 July	18:00	United States	3–0	Cuba	25–21	25–16	25–13			75–50	P2

=== Final ===
Date	Time		Score		Set 1	Set 2	Set 3	Set 4	Set 5	Total	Report
9 July	20:00	Dominican Republic	0–3	Brazil	20–25	22–25	19–25			61–75	P2

== Final standing ==
Rank	Team
1st place, gold medalist(s)	Brazil
2nd place, silver medalist(s)	Dominican Republic
3rd place, bronze medalist(s)	United States
4	Cuba
5	Puerto Rico
6	Argentina
7	Canada
8	Peru
9	Mexico
10	Trinidad and Tobago
11	Costa Rica
12	Chile

2011 Women's Pan-American Cup champions

Brazil
3rd title

- Brazil, Dominican Republic, the United States, Cuba, Puerto Rico and Argentina qualified for the 2012 FIVB World Grand Prix.

== Individual awards ==
- Most valuable player
  - Sheilla Castro (BRA)
- Best scorer
  - Sarah Pavan (CAN)
- Best spiker
  - Prisilla Rivera (DOM)
- Best blocker
  - Thaisa Menezes (BRA)
- Best server
  - Lisvel Elisa Eve (DOM)
- Best digger
  - Brenda Castillo (DOM)
- Best setter
  - Elena Keldibekova (PER)
- Best receiver
  - Fabiana de Oliveira (BRA)
- Best libero
  - Brenda Castillo (DOM)
