= San Isidro =

(San) Isidro or (San) Ysidro may refer to:

== People ==
=== Saints ===
- Saint Isidore the Laborer (c. 1070 – died 1130), the patron saint of farmers of Madrid (Spain) and La Ceiba (Honduras)
- Saint Isidore of Seville (c. 560 – died 636), scholar and Archbishop of Seville

=== Given name ===
- Isidro Ancheta (1882–1946), Filipino landscape painter
- Isidro Ayora (1879–1978), Ecuadorian politician
- Isidro Barradas, Spanish general sent to Mexico in 1829
- Isidro de Alaix Fábregas, Count of Vergara and Viscount of Villarrobledo (1790-1853), Spanish general of the First Carlist War
- Isidro del Prado (born 1959), Filipino sprinter
- Isidro Díaz González (born 1954), Spanish retired professional footballer
- Isidro Díaz (footballer, born 1972), Spanish footballer
- Isidro Fabela (1882–1964), Mexican judge, politician, professor, writer, publisher and governor of the State of Mexico
- Isidro Fabré (1895–?), Cuban baseball pitcher
- Isidro García (boxer) (born 1976), Mexican boxer
- Isidro Goma y Tomas (1869–1940), Spanish Bishop, Cardinal and Archbishop
- Isidro González (1907–?), Spanish fencer
- Isidro Gutiérrez (born 1989), Salvadoran footballer
- Isidro A. Negrón Irizarry (born 1956), Puerto Rican politician
- Isidro Lángara (1912—1992), Spanish footballer
- Isidro Márquez (born 1965), Mexican Major League Baseball pitcher
- Isidro Montoya (born 1990), Colombian sprinter
- Isidro Mosquea (born 1976), boxer from the Dominican Republic
- Isidro Nozal (born 1977), former Spanish professional road racing cyclist
- Isidro Pedraza Chávez (born 1959), Mexican politician
- Isidro Rico (born 1961), Mexican marathon runner
- Isidro Salusky, American nephrologist
- Isidro Ungab (born 1961), Filipino politician

=== Surname ===
- Agot Isidro (born 1966), Filipina actress
- Orlanda Velez Isidro (born 1972), Portuguese soprano
- Pedro Isidro (born 1985), Portuguese race walker

== Places ==
=== Argentina ===
- San Isidro, Buenos Aires, a municipality in the Greater Buenos Aires area
- San Isidro Partido, a partido of the province of Buenos Aires
- San Isidro, Catamarca, a town in the Catamarca Province
- San Isidro, San Juan, head town of the San Martín department in the San Juan Province
- San Isidro de Iruya, a village in Salta Province

=== Belize ===
- San Isidro, Belize, a village in Toledo District

=== Costa Rica ===
- San Isidro de Heredia, a canton in the Heredia province
  - San Isidro District, San Isidro. A district in the San Isidro canton, where the head city of the canton is located
- San Isidro de El General, a district in the canton of Pérez Zeledón, San José province
- San Isidro District, Alajuela, in the canton of Alajuela, Alajuela province
- San Isidro District, Atenas, in the canton of Atenas, Alajuela province
- San Isidro District, El Guarco, in the canton of El Guarco, Cartago province
- San Isidro District, Grecia, in the canton of Grecia, Alajuela province
- San Isidro District, León Cortés, in the canton of León Cortés, San José province
- San Isidro District, Montes de Oro, in the canton of Montes de Oro, Puntarenas province
- San Isidro District, San Ramón, in the canton of San Ramón, Alajuela province
- San Isidro District, Vásquez de Coronado, in the canton of Vásquez de Coronado, San José province

=== Dominican Republic ===
- San Isidro Air Base, an air base 25 km east of Santo Domingo

=== El Salvador ===
- San Isidro, Morazán, a municipality in the Morazán Department
- San Isidro Labrador, El Salvador, a municipality in the Chalatenango Department
- San Isidro, Cabañas, a district in the Cabañas Department
  - San Isidro (river), a river in the district
- San Isidro (archaeological site), near Canton el Sunza in the Sonsonate Department

=== Guatemala ===
- San Isidro, Guatemala, a locality in Guatemala City

=== Honduras ===
- San Isidro, Choluteca, a municipality in the Choluteca department

=== Mexico ===
- San Isidro, Baja California Sur, a city in the state of Baja California Sur
- San Isidro, Chiapas, a locality in the municipality of Pijijiapan
- San Isidro, Chihuahua, a locality in the municipality of Juárez
- San Isidro, Jalisco, a city in the state of Jalisco
- San Isidro, Michoacán, a city in the state of Michoacán
- San Isidro (Mexicable), an aerial lift station in Ecatepec

=== Nicaragua ===
- San Isidro, Matagalpa, a municipality in the Matagalpa department

=== Peru ===
- San Isidro District, Lima, a district in the Lima province
- San Isidro District, Huaytará, a district in the Huaytará province
- San Isidro de Maino District, a district in the Chachapoyas province

=== Philippines ===
- San Isidro, a barangay of the municipality of Angono in the Rizal province
- San Isidro, Abra, a municipality in the province of Abra
- San Isidro, Bohol, a municipality in the province of Bohol
- San Isidro, Davao del Norte, a municipality in the province of Davao del Norte
- San Isidro, Davao Oriental, a municipality in the province of Davao Oriental
- San Isidro, Isabela, a municipality in the province of Isabela
- San Isidro, Leyte, a municipality in the province of Leyte
- San Isidro, Northern Samar, a municipality in the province of Northern Samar
- San Isidro, Nueva Ecija, a municipality in the province of Nueva Ecija
- San Isidro, Lupao, Nueva Ecija, a barangay in the municipality of Lupao, Nueva Ecija
- San Isidro, a barangay of the municipality of Rodriguez in the Rizal province
- San Isidro, Parañaque
- San Isidro, Surigao del Norte, a municipality on Siargao Island in the province of Surigao del Norte
- San Isidro, San Pablo, a barangay of San Pablo City in the Laguna province
- San Isidro, Makati (Barangay), an area in the Makati Poblacion in the Manila metropolitan area
- San Isidro, Tagbilaran City, a barangay of Tagbilaran in the Bohol province
- San Isidro, Bohol (barangay), a barangay of Ubay, in the province of Bohol
- San Isidro, Cabuyao, a barangay of Cabuyao in the province of Laguna
- San Isidro, a barangay of the municipality of Macabebe in the province of Pampanga

=== Portugal ===
- Santo Isidro de Pegões, a parish in the Montijo municipality in the Setúbal district

=== Puerto Rico ===
- San Isidro, Culebra, Puerto Rico, a barrio in the island-municipality of Culebras

=== Spain ===
- San Isidro, Alicante, a village in the province of Alicante
- San Isidro, a town in the municipality of Granadilla de Abona, Tenerife, Canary Islands
- San Isidro (Madrid), a ward (barrio) of Madrid, named after the patron saint of Madrid

=== United States ===
- Old Gilroy, California, formerly San Isidro, an unincorporated community in Santa Clara County, California
- San Ysidro, San Diego, a district in the city of San Diego, California
- San Ysidro District AVA, a Californian wine region in Santa Clara County
- San Ysidro Ranch, a ranch in Santa Barbara County, California
- San Ysidro, Doña Ana County, New Mexico, a place in Doña Ana County, New Mexico
- San Ysidro, Sandoval County, New Mexico, a village in Sandoval County, New Mexico
- San Isidro, Texas, a place in Starr County, Texas

== Sports ==
- A.D. Isidro Metapán, a Salvadoran football club based in Metapán, El Salvador
- C.D. Águila San Isidro, a Salvadoran football club based near Chinameca, San Miguel
- CD Betis San Isidro, a Spanish football club based in Madrid
- CD San Isidro, a Spanish football team based in San Isidro, Canary Islands
- Club Atlético San Isidro (CASI), an Argentinian multi-sports club based in San Isidro, Buenos Aires
- Club Náutico San Isidro, a sailing club based in San Isidro, Buenos Aires
- San Isidro Club (SIC), an Argentinian multi-sports club based in Boulogne Sur Mer, Buenos Aires

== Other uses ==
- Iglesia San Isidro Labrador y Santa María de la Cabeza, an 1844 Spanish Colonial building in Sabana Grande, Puerto Rico
- Instituto San Isidro, an historic school in Madrid, Spain
- Nuestra Señora de los Dolores y San Isidro Labrador, Libertad, a Roman Catholic parish church in Libertad, San José Department, Uruguay
- San Isidro Church, Madrid, a baroque church in central Madrid, Spain, which holds the relics of Isidore the Laborer
- San Isidro Movement, a Cuban dissident group
- San Isidro (Panama Metro), a rapid transit station in Panama City
- San Ysidro Ranch, a hotel and resort near Santa Barbara, California

== See also ==
- Isidro
- St. Isidore (disambiguation)
