= Isidro =

Isidro is a given name. Notable people with the name include:

== Saints ==
- Saint Isidore the Laborer (c. 1070 – died 1130), the patron saint of farmers of Madrid (Spain) and La Ceiba (Honduras)
- Saint Isidore of Seville (c. 560 – died 636), scholar and Archbishop of Seville

== Given name ==
- Isidro Ancheta (1882–1946), Filipino landscape painter
- Isidro Ayora (1879–1978), Ecuadorian politician
- Isidro Barradas, Spanish general sent to Mexico in 1829
- Isidro Casanova (1870–1955), the namesake of the town of Isidro Casanova, Argentina
- Isidro de Alaix Fábregas, Count of Vergara and Viscount of Villarrobledo (1790-1853), Spanish general of the First Carlist War
- Isidro del Prado (born 1959), Filipino sprinter
- Isidro Díaz González (born 1954), Spanish retired professional footballer
- Isidro Díaz (footballer, born 1972), Spanish footballer
- Isidro Fabela (1882–1964), Mexican judge, politician, professor, writer, publisher and governor of the State of Mexico
- Isidro Fabré (1895–?), Cuban baseball pitcher
- Isidro Galban, Filipino politician
- Isidro García (boxer) (born 1976), Mexican boxer
- Isidro Goma y Tomas (1869–1940), Spanish Bishop, Cardinal and Archbishop
- Isidro González (1907–?), Spanish fencer
- Isidro Gutiérrez (born 1989), Salvadoran footballer
- Isidro A. Negrón Irizarry (born 1956), Puerto Rican politician
- Isidro Lángara (1912—1992), Spanish footballer
- Isidro Lapeña, Filipino retired police officer and former government official
- Isidro Márquez (born 1965), Mexican Major League Baseball pitcher
- Isidro Más de Ayala (1899-1960), Uruguayan psychiatrist and author
- Isidro Montoya (born 1990), Colombian sprinter
- Isidro Mosquea (born 1976), boxer from the Dominican Republic
- Isidro Nozal (born 1977), former Spanish professional road racing cyclist
- Isidro Pedraza Chávez (1959–2020), Mexican politician
- Isidro Rico (born 1961), Mexican marathon runner
- Isidro Salusky, American nephrologist
- Isidro Ungab (born 1961), Filipino politician

== See also ==
- San Isidro
- St. Isidore (disambiguation)
