= Isidore (disambiguation) =

Isidore is a male given name.

Isidore or Isador may refer to:

== In arts and entertainment ==
- Isidore, a band composed of Steve Kilbey of The Church and Jeffrey Cain, formerly of Remy Zero
- "Isadore", a song on the album If Not Now, When? by Incubus
- Jack Isidore, protagonist of Philip K. Dick's novel Confessions of a Crap Artist
- John R. Isidore, a fictional character in Philip K. Dick's novel Do Androids Dream of Electric Sheep?

== Other uses ==
- Hurricane Isidore (disambiguation)
- Isidore (platform), is a web-based platform dedicated to the sharing of scientific knowledge in human and social sciences.
- Isadore Nabi, pseudonym used by a group of scientists
- Isadore, Michigan, a small unincorporated community in Centerville Township, Michigan

== See also ==
- Isadora (disambiguation)
- St. Isidore (disambiguation)
- Isidoro, a given name and surname
- Isidoro, nom de guerre of Felipe González (born 1942), socialist leader in Franco-era Spain
