= Isidoro =

Isidoro is a masculine given name and a surname related to Isidore. The name is borne by:

== People ==
=== Given name ===
- Isidoro Acevedo (communist) (1867–1952), Spanish politician, trade unionist, activist and writer
- Isidoro Álvarez (1935–2014), Spanish businessman
- Isidoro Amalfitano (1864), Senior Project Engineer McCarthy
- Isidoro Arredondo (1655–1702), Spanish painter
- Isidoro Bianchi (1581–1662), Italian painter
- Isidoro Blaisten (1933–2004), Argentine writer
- Isidoro Carini (1843–1895), Italian religious, teacher, historian and palaeographer
- Isidoro Chiari (1495–1555), Italian Roman Catholic Bishop of Foligno, a founding father of the Council of Trent and editor
- Isidoro Díaz (born 1938), Mexican former footballer
- Isidoro Diéguez Dueñas (1909–1942), Spanish communist
- Isidoro Falchi (1838–1914), Italian doctor and self-taught archaeologist
- Isidoro Grünhut (1862–1896), Italian painter
- Isidoro Hinestroza (born 1997), Panamanian footballer
- Isidoro Ibarra (born 1992), Argentine field hockey player
- Isidoro Dias Lopes (1865–1949), Brazilian brigadier general, one of the leaders of the 1924 revolt
- Isidoro de María (1815–1906), Uruguayan writer, historian, journalist, politician and diplomat
- Isidoro Mendes (born 1951), Brazilian footballer
- Isidoro Pentorio (1568–1622), Roman Catholic prelate and Bishop of Asti
- Isidoro Rudimch (1942–1999), Palauan politician
- Isidoro Ruiz (born 1955), Mexican politician
- Isidoro Sain (1869–1932), Croatian Roman Catholic Bishop of Rijeka
- Isidoro San José (born 1955), Spanish retired footballer
- Isidoro Verga (1832–1899), Italian Roman Catholic canon lawyer and cardinal

=== Surname ===
- Demetrio Román Isidoro (born 1959), Mexican politician and architect
- Fabrício Isidoro (born 1992), Brazilian footballer
- José Isidoro (born 1986), Spanish football assistant manager and former player
- Micael Isidoro (born 1982), Portuguese road cyclist
- Paulo Isidoro (born 1953), Brazilian former footballer
- Paulo Isidoro (footballer, born 1973), Brazilian former footballer
- Raimundo Isidoro da Silva (born 1953), Brazilian former footballer

=== Pseudonym ===
- Felipe González (born 1942), Spanish politician using Isidoro as his nom de guerre during Francoism.

== Fictional characters ==
- Isidoro Cañones, in Argentine comic books

== See also ==
- Isidro
