= Demographics of Erie, Pennsylvania =

Historical population
Census	Pop.	Note	%±
1800	81		—
1810	394		386.4%
1820	635		61.2%
1830	1,465		130.7%
1840	3,412		132.9%
1850	5,858		71.7%
1860	9,419		60.8%
1870	19,646		108.6%
1880	27,737		41.2%
1890	40,634		46.5%
1900	52,733		29.8%
1910	66,525		26.2%
1920	93,372		40.4%
1930	115,967		24.2%
1940	116,955		0.9%
1950	130,803		11.8%
1960	138,440		5.8%
1970	129,231		−6.7%
1980	119,123		−7.8%
1990	108,718		−8.7%
2000	103,717		−4.6%
2010	101,786		−1.9%
2020	94,831		−6.8%
2025 (est.)	91,838		−3.2%
U.S. Decennial Census; 1880–19701980–1990; 2020 Census

=== 2020 census ===
As of the 2020 census, there were 94,831 people, 39,057 households, and 20,992 families residing in the city. The population density was 4,953.56 inhabitants per square mile (1,912.58/km^{2}). There were 43,625 housing units at an average density of 2,278.78 per square mile (879.84/km^{2}). The racial makeup of the city was 66.21% White, 17.99% African American, 0.24% Native American, 3.75% Asian, 0.04% Pacific Islander, 3.53% from some other races and 8.24% from two or more races. Hispanic or Latino people of any race were 8.55% of the population.

=== 2010 census ===
As of the 2010 census, there were 101,786 people, 40,913 households, and 22,915 families residing in the city. The population density was 5,334.42 inhabitants per square mile (2,059.63/km^{2}). There were 44,790 housing units at an average density of 2,347.36 per square mile (906.32/km^{2}). The racial makeup of the city was 74.99% White, 16.84% African American, 0.29% Native American, 1.49% Asian, 0.05% Pacific Islander, 2.45% from some other races and 3.89% from two or more races. Hispanic or Latino people of any race were 6.88% of the population.

=== 2000 census ===
As of the 2000 census, there were 103,717 people, 40,938 households, and 24,480 families residing in the city. The population density was 4,722.93 inhabitants per square mile (1,823.53/km^{2}). There were 44,971 housing units at an average density of 2,047.83 per square mile (790.67/km^{2}). The racial makeup of the city was 80.56% White, 14.20% African American, 0.22% Native American, 0.75% Asian, 0.04% Pacific Islander, 1.92% from some other races and 2.32% from two or more races. Hispanic or Latino people of any race were 4.41% of the population.

There were 40,938 households, out of which 29.2% had children under the age of 18 living with them, 38.2% were married couples living together, 16.8% had a female householder with no husband present, and 40.2% were non-families. Individuals made up 33.4% of all households, and 13.3% had someone living alone who was 65 years of age or older. The average household size was 2.39 and the average family size was 3.08.

In the city, the population was distributed by age, with 25.4% under the age of 18, 11.6% from 18 to 24, 28.5% from 25 to 44, 19.2% from 45 to 64, and 15.4% who were 65 years of age or older. The median age was 34 years. For every 100 females there were 90.8 males. For every 100 females age 18 and over, there were 86.2 males.

The median income for a household in the city was $28,387, and the median income for a family was $36,446. Males had a median income of $30,714 versus $21,828 for females. The per capita income for the city was $14,972. About 13.8% of families and 18.8% of the population were below the poverty line, including 27.0% of those under age 18 and 10.3% of those age 65 or over.

The poorest zip code in Pennsylvania is 16501 earning an average an income of 10,328 annually.

Erie has long been declining in population due to the departure of many businesses and factories.

The city has lost over 40,000 people since the early 1970s, allowing Allentown to claim the third largest spot.

The major ethnic groups of the City of Erie are roughly broken down into 24% German, 14% Irish, 14% Polish, 13% Italian, 6% English, 2% Swedish, 2% French, 2% Russian, and the remaining 23% make up the ‘other’ category.

Since the mid-1990s, the International Institute of Erie (IIE), founded in 1919, has helped with the resettlement of refugees from Bosnia, Eritrea, Ghana, Iraq, Kosovo, Liberia, Nepal, Bhutan, Burma, Somalia, Sudan, the former Soviet Union, and Vietnam.

== Church ==
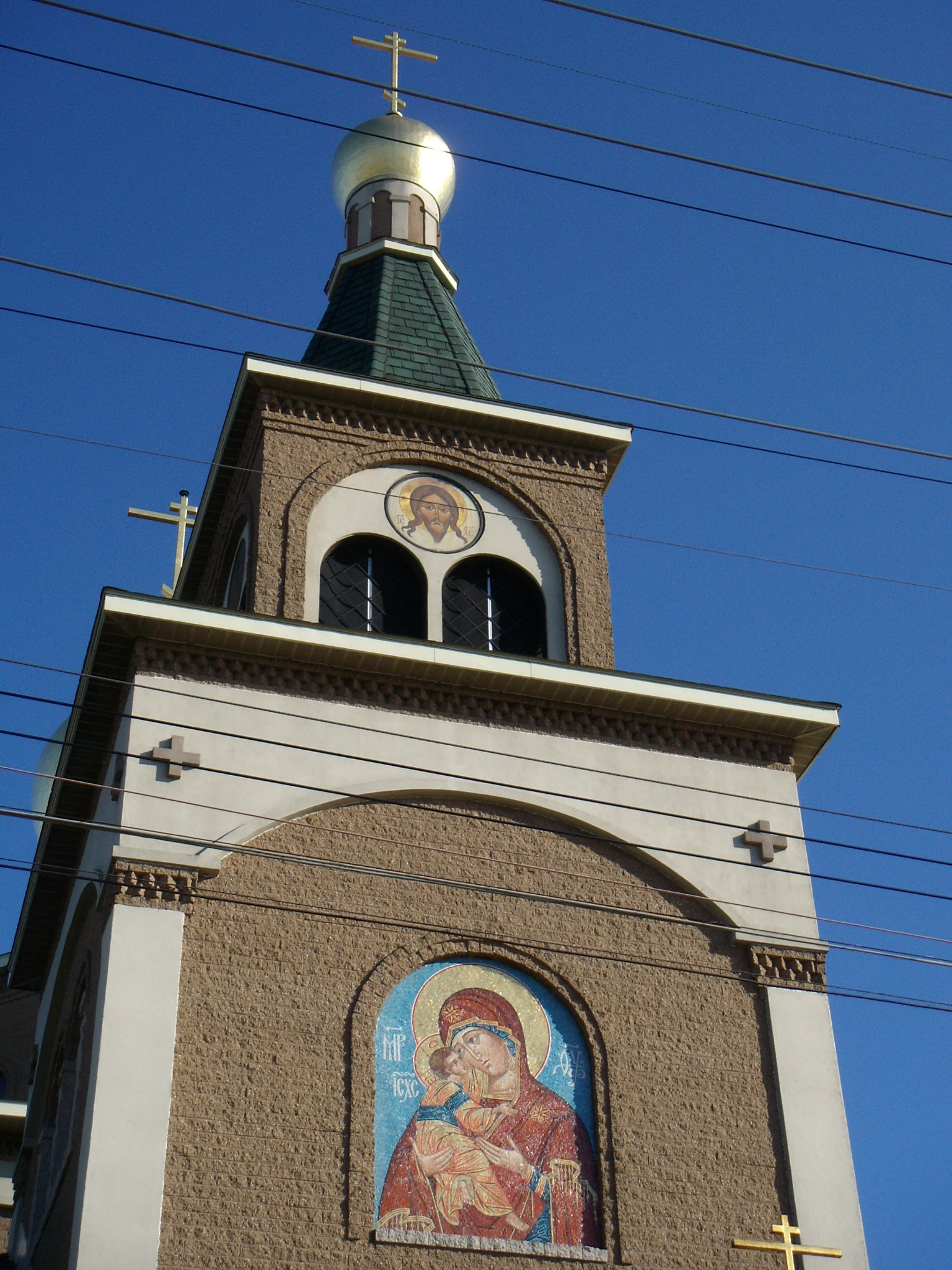
Russian Orthodox Church in Erie

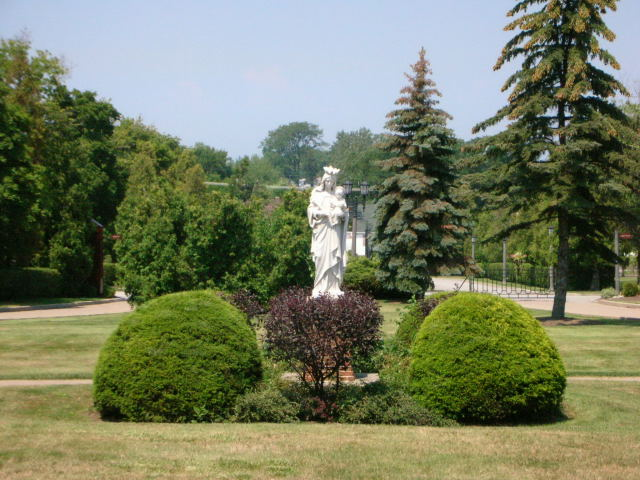
Catholic influence is felt beyond the parish in Erie; here, at entrance to Mercyhurst College.

In the early 20th century, Erie had a significant Russian immigrant community, many of whom worked in the shipbuilding plants along the bayfront. Unusual for a Great Lakes city, a substantial number of these Russian immigrants were Old Believers. Even today, the gold-domed Church of the Nativity, on the bayfront near the former heart of the Russian community, is an Old Believer church, home to famed Icon painter Fr. Theodore Jurewicz. Bishop Daniel of Erie, of the Russian Orthodox Church Outside Russia, is based in Erie and is the Vicar President of the Synod of Bishops for the Old Believers.

Erie has a Jewish community that is over one hundred fifty years old. Temple Anshe Hesed, a member of the Union for Reform Judaism, is served by its spiritual leader, Rabbi John L. Bush. Erie is home to the Roman Catholic Diocese of Erie, covering 13 counties (9,936 mi^{2}- the largest in the state). Its diocesan seat is the Saint Peter Cathedral in Erie, which has a 265 ft central tower flanked by two 150 ft towers. It is among the tallest churches in the U.S and was constructed in 1873.

According to the Association of Religion Date Archives, The ARDA Database has no precise figures on the membership of African American churches, so it provides an estimate of 25,000 members. The two Russian orthodox churches list no membership numbers. The Salvation Army lists over 4,000 members. Jews were under a thousand, while Quakers showed no membership. Erie County had a total 2000 population of 280,843 persons, of which 103,333 claimed affiliation with the Catholic Church, 40,301 with mainline Protestant houses of worship, and 12,980 with evangelical Protestant churches.

== Refugees ==
Erie had been welcoming refugees since 1919. In 2009, International Institute of Erie formally joined USCRI as a Field Office. Since 2008, Erie has welcomed more than 13,500 refugees. Approximately one-third of those refugees (4,384) journeyed here from Burma, while another 2,056 traveled from Somalia and 1,426 arrived from Iraq; these three countries alone account for over half of the total refugee population finding safety and a new start in Erie County since 2008. In November 2020, the mayor announced that the City of Erie has been named a Certified Welcoming Place by Welcoming America.
