= Max C. Currick =

American rabbi

Max Cohen Currick
- Born: September 1, 1877; Boston, Massachusetts
- Died: May 23, 1947 (aged 69); Albany, New York, U.S.
- Education: Hebrew Union College, University of Cincinnati
- Occupations: Rabbi, editor, community leader
- Known for: President of the Central Conference of American Rabbis; leadership in civic and Jewish organizations in Erie, Pennsylvania
- Spouse: Florence Baker (m. 1910)

Max Cohen Currick (September 1, 1877 – May 23, 1947) was an American rabbi.

== Life ==
Currick was born on September 1, 1877, in Boston, Massachusetts, the son of Fishel Currick and Hannah Ganut.

Currick was educated in New York City public schools, the College of the City of New York, the Hebrew Orphan Asylum of New York. He graduated from Hebrew Union College with a Bachelor of Hebrew in 1894. In 1898 he was ordained a rabbi by Hebrew Union College and graduated from the University of Cincinnati with an A.B. He served as rabbi of the United Hebrew Congregation in Fort Smith, Arkansas, from 1898 to 1901.

In 1901, Currick became rabbi of Temple Anshe Hesed in Erie, Pennsylvania. He was editor of the Erie Dispatch from 1910 to 1912, and in 1919 he became its contributing editor. He was also chairman of the board of editors of Liberal Judaism, the house organ of the Union of American Hebrew Congregations. During World War I, he was chairman of the Council of National Defense and Four Minute Men. He served as chairman of the Central Conference of American Rabbis (CCAR) Committee on International Peace from 1927 to 1935. He was also the CCAR's vice-president from 1935 to 1937 and its president from 1937 to 1939. President during Hitler's rise to power, he called for greater cooperation among American Jews to meet the rising anti-Semitism, believing Synagogue Council of America should be given a broader mandate to speak on behalf of American Jewry and opposing the creation of a new umbrella organization as some Jewish leaders supported. At one point, he cosponsored a resolution at the CCAR to strongly condemn "immorality" in Hollywood films, although it wasn't adopted. He was also on the Board of Governors of Hebrew Union College. During World War II, he was chairman of the regional panel of the War Labor Board.

Currick was a columnist for the Erie Daily Times, the Erie Dispatch-Herald, and the Erie Observer. In 1918, he became vice-president of the Community Chest of Erie County. He served as vice-president of the Erie Public Library from 1923 to 1937 and became its president in 1937. He joined the Board of Governors of the B'nai B'rith Home for Children in Fairview in 1912, and in 1939 he became its president. He was chairman of the Erie Playhouse from 1916 to 1927 and was a board member until 1936. He was also an honorary member of the Erie County Chapter of the American Red Cross, an honorary president of the District Grand Lodge No. 3 of B'nai B'rith, and a board member of the Erie Boys' Club, the Anti-Tuberculosis Society, and the Child-Parent Bureau. In 1945, the Isadore Sobel Lodge of B'nai B'rith presented him with an Award of Merit. He married Florence Baker in 1910.

Currick was found dead from a heart ailment on a berth in a New York Central train when it pulled into Union Station in Albany, New York, on May 23, 1947.
