= Carmen Romero López =

Spanish politician (born 1946)

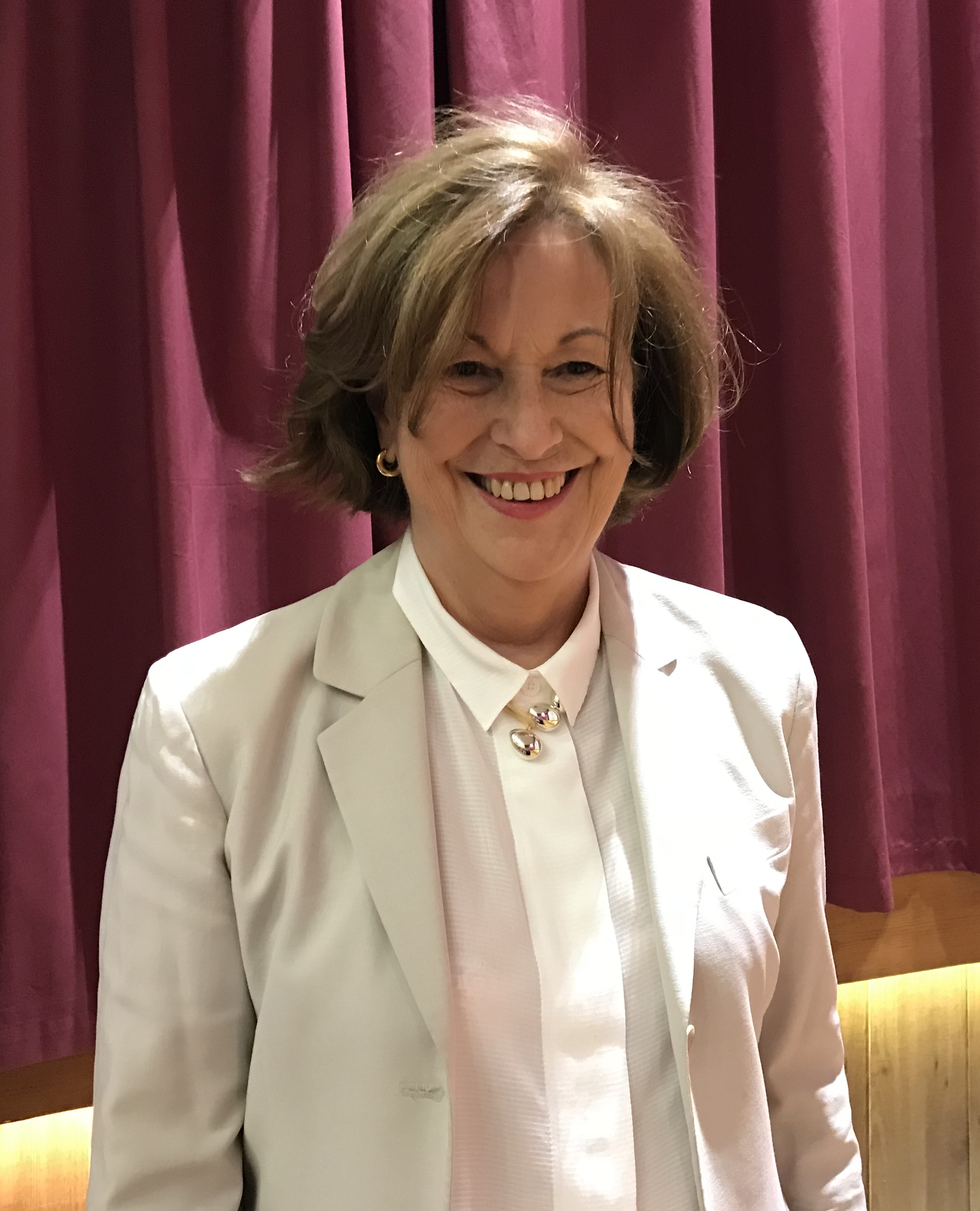
- Romero López in 2017

Member of the European Parliament
- In office 14 July 2009 – 30 June 2014
- Constituency: Spain

Personal details
- Born: 15 November 1946 (age 79) Seville, Andalusia, Spain
- Party: Spanish Socialist Workers Party
- Spouse: Felipe González (m. 1969; div. 2008)
- Children: 3
- Occupation: Politician

Carmen Romero López (born 15 November 1946), is a Spanish politician. From 2009 to 2014, she served as a member of the European Parliament, representing Spain for the Spanish Socialist Workers Party.
