= Pan de Azúcar metro station =

Panama metro station

Estación Pan de Azúcar
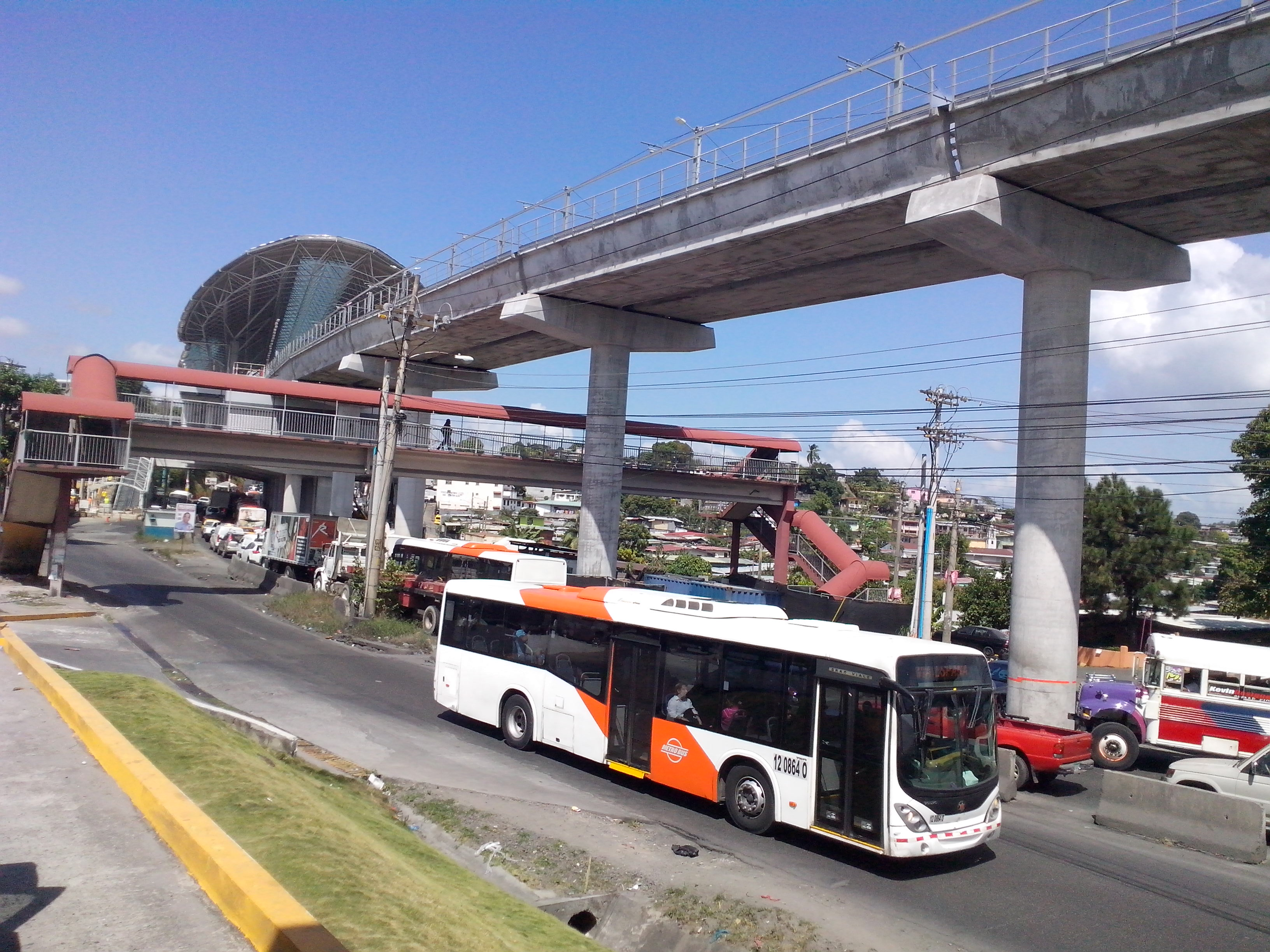
- Line 1 elevated viaduct with Pan de Azúcar station in the background

General information
- Location: Victoriano Lorenzo, San Miguelito; Panama City; Panama
- Coordinates: 9°02′28″N 79°30′30″W
- System: Panama Metro station
- Line: Line 1
- Platforms: 2

History
- Opened: 5 April 2014; 12 years ago

Services
Preceding station	Panama Metro	Following station
San Miguelito toward Albrook	Line 1	Los Andes toward Villa Zaita
Location

Pan de Azúcar is a Panama Metro station on Line 1. It was one of the first 11 stations when the metro was opened on 5 April 2014 and began operations on the following day. It is an elevated station. The station is located between San Miguelito and Los Andes.

Pan de Azúcar station is located in San Miguelito District, next to Highway 3.
