= Isidore =

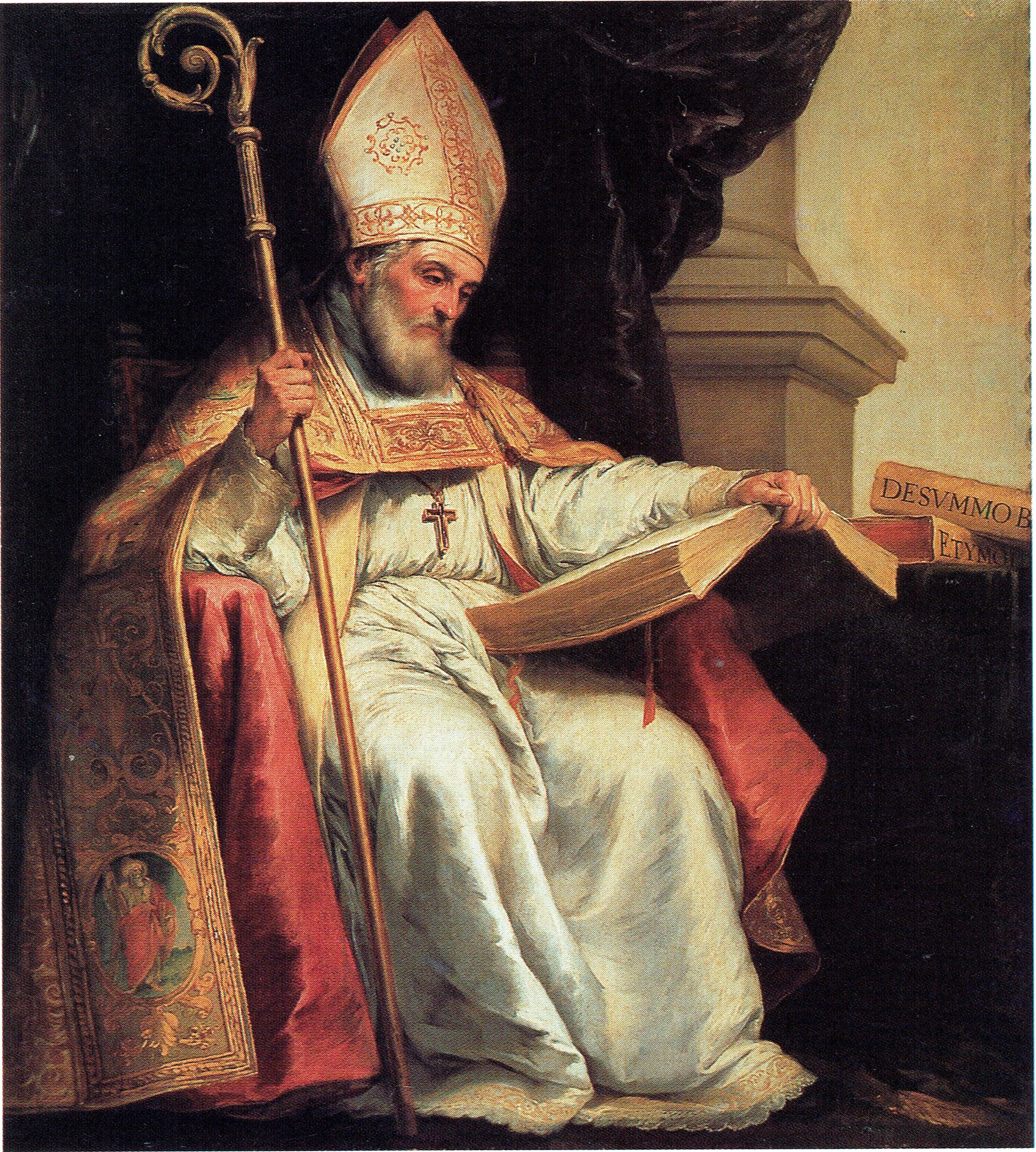
- Isidore of Seville
- Pronunciation: English: /ˈɪzɪdɔːr/ French: [izidɔʁ]
- Gender: Male

Origin
- Origin: English and French, from Greek
- Meaning: "gift of Isis"

Other names
- Nicknames: Dore, Dori, Dory, Issy, Itchik, Izzy, Sid, Siddy
- Related names: Isadore, Isador, Isidoro, Esidoro, Isidro, Ysidro, Isidor, Isidora

Isidore (/ˈɪzɪdɔːr/ IZ-id-or; also spelled Isador, Isadore and Isidor) is a masculine given name. The name is derived from the Greek name Isídōros (Ἰσίδωρος, latinized Isidorus) and can literally be translated to 'gift of Isis'. The name has survived in various forms throughout the centuries. Although it has never been a common name, it has historically been popular due to its association with Catholic figures and among the Jewish diaspora. Isidora is the feminine form of the name.

== Pre-modern era ==
Ordered chronologically

=== Religious figures ===
- Isidorus (2nd century AD), pagan Egyptian priest
- Isidore, son of Basilides, the Egyptian Christian Gnostic (2nd century AD)
- Isidore of Chios (died 251), Roman Christian martyr
- Isidore of Scetes (died c. 390), 4th-century Egyptian Christian priest and desert ascetic
- Isidore of Alexandria (died 403), Egyptian Christian priest, saint
- Isidore of Pelusium (died c. 449), Egyptian monk, saint and prolific letter writer
- Isidore of Seville (c. 560–636), Catholic saint and scholar, last of the Fathers of the Church and Archbishop of Seville
- Isidore the Farmer (c. 1070–1130), Spanish saint venerated in the Catholic Church, Anglican Communion and Aglipayan Church
- Isidore I of Constantinople (died 1350), Greek Ecumenical Patriarch (1347–1350)
- Isidore II of Constantinople (died 1462), Greek Ecumenical Patriarch (1456–1462)
- Isidore of Kiev (1385–1463), Greek religious leader and theologian

=== Others ===
- Isidore of Charax (fl. 1st century), Greek geographer
- Isidore of Alexandria (died c. 520), Greco-Egyptian philosopher
- Isidore of Miletus, Greek architect who co-designed the Hagia Sophia in Constantinople from 532 to 537
- Isidore (inventor), according to legend the Russian Orthodox monk erroneously credited with producing the first genuine recipe of Russian vodka, c. 1430

== Modern world ==
Ordered alphabetically by last name

- Isidore Gordon Ascher (1835–1933), British-Canadian novelist and poet
- Isidor Bajić (1878–1915), Serbian composer, pedagogue and publisher
- Isidore Bakanja (c. 1885–1909), beatified martyr in the Belgium Congo
- Isidor George Beaver (1859–1934), British-born Australian architect
- Isadore "Kid Cann" Blumenfeld (1900–1981), Romanian-born American gangster
- Isadore Coop (1926–2003), Canadian architect
- Isador Coriat (1875–1943), American psychiatrist and neurologist
- Ivor Cutler (born Isadore; 1923–2006), Scottish poet, songwriter and humorist
- Isidore Ducasse (1846–1870), French poet best known under the nom de plume of Comte de Lautréamont
- Isadore Ellis (1910–1994), American animator
- Isidor Izzy Einstein (1880–1938), American federal police officer during the Prohibition era
- Isidor Fisch (1905–1934), German associate of Bruno Hauptmann
- Isadore Freleng (1906–1995), better known as Friz Freleng, American animator
- Isidore Goldblum (1863–1925), Polish Hebrew writer and bibliographer
- Isador Goodman (1909–1982), South African-Australian musician and composer
- Isidor Gunsberg (1854–1930), Hungarian chess player
- Isidore Itzkowitz (1892–1964), better known as Eddie Cantor, American performer and comedian
- Isadore Gilbert Jeffery (1840–1919), American poet, lyricist
- Isidor Kaufmann (1853–1921), Austro-Hungarian painter of Jewish themes
- I. B. Kornblum (1895–1996; né Isadore Benjamin Kornblum), American composer, lawyer, and pianist
- Izidor Kürschner (1885–1941), Hungarian football player and coach
- Isadore Gilbert Mudge (1875–1957), American librarian
- Isidore Newman (fl. 1903), founder of the Isidore Newman School
- Isidore Okpewho (1941–2016), Nigerian writer and critic
- Isidor Philipp (1863–1958), Hungarian-French pianist, composer and pedagogue
- Isidor Isaac Rabi (1898–1988), Galician-born American physicist and Nobel laureate
- Maximilien François Marie Isidore de Robespierre (1758–1794), French lawyer and revolutionary
- Isidor Rosenthal (1836–1915), German physiologist
- Isadore Singer (1924–2021), American mathematician
- Isador Sobel (1858–1939), American lawyer
- Isidore Spielmann (1854–1925), British art critic and exhibition organizer
- I. F. Stone (1907–1989), American investigative journalist
- Isidor Straus (1845–1912), co-owner of Macy's, drowned in the sinking of RMS Titanic
- Isador Samuel Turover (1892–1978), Belgian-American chess master
- Chief Isadore (fl. 1860s), leader of the Ktunaxa/Kootenay people in the Tobacco Plains War
