= Isadora (disambiguation) =

Isadora or Isidora is a feminine given name. It may also refer to:

== Arts and entertainment ==
- Isadora (film), a 1968 biopic of Isadora Duncan, starring Vanessa Redgrave
- Isadora (ballet), a 1981 ballet about Isadora Duncan
- Isadora Records, a record label
- "Isadora", a song on the album Witchby the band Witch

== Surname ==
- Rachel Isadora (born 1953), American illustrator, children's book author and painter
- Danny Isidora (born 1994), American football player

== Other uses ==
- Isadora (software), computer software
- "Isadora", codename of Linux Mint version 9 - see Linux Mint version history
- IsaDora cosmetics, a Swedish cosmetics brand
- Isadora, Missouri, United States, an unincorporated community

== See also ==
- Isidore (disambiguation)
