= Los Andes metro station =

Panama metro station

Estación Los Andes
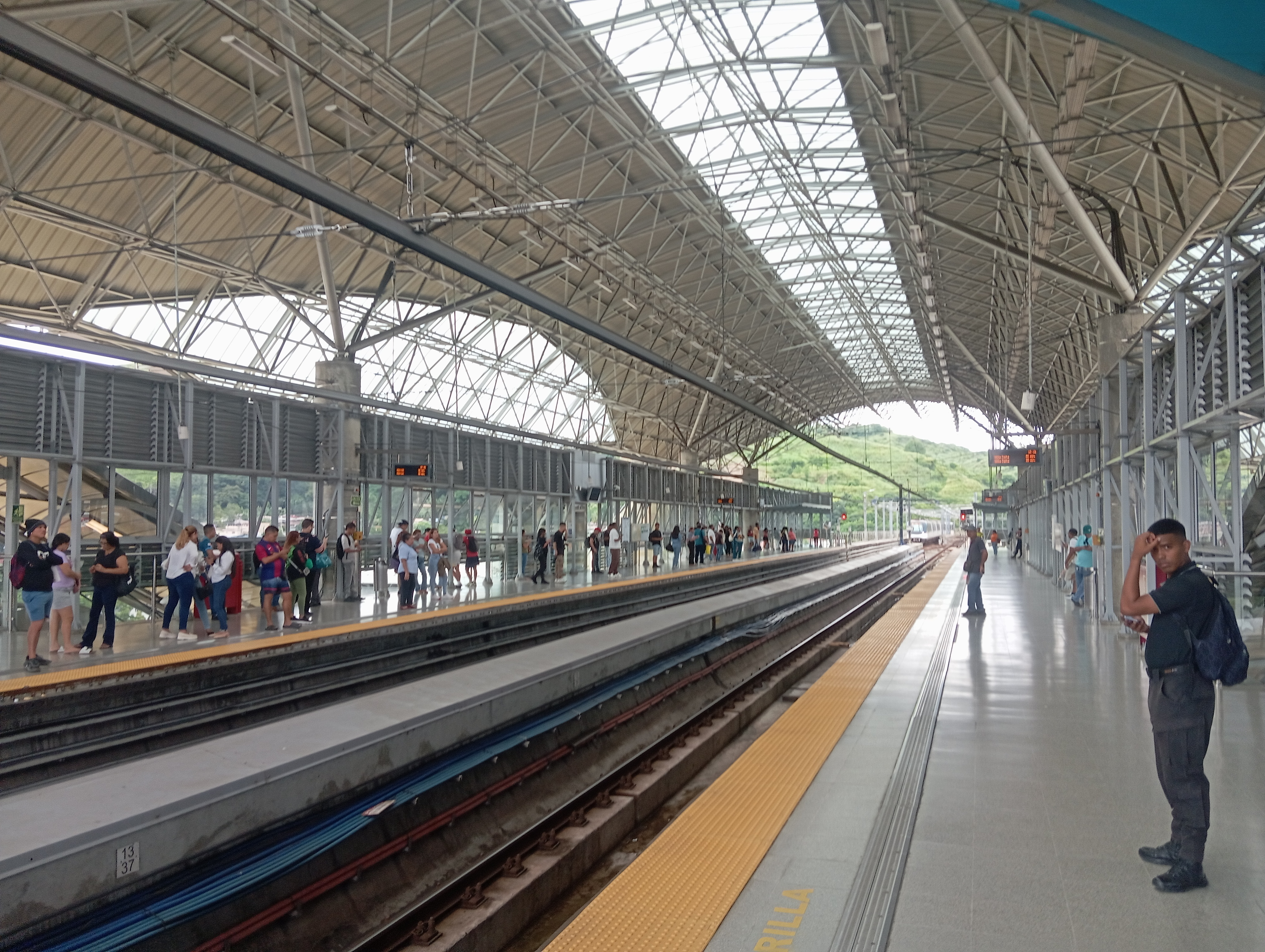

General information
- Location: Avenida Transístmica; San Miguelito; Panama City; Panama
- Coordinates: 9°02′58″N 79°30′31″W
- System: Panama Metro station
- Line: Line 1
- Platforms: 2

History
- Opened: 5 April 2014; 12 years ago

Services
Preceding station	Panama Metro	Following station
Pan de Azúcar toward Albrook	Line 1	San Isidro toward Villa Zaita
Location

Los Andes is a Panama Metro station on Line 1. It was one of the first 11 stations when the metro was opened on 5 April 2014 and began operations on the following day. It is an elevated station. The station is located between Pan de Azúcar and San Isidro. It remained the northern terminus of Line 1 until 15 August 2015, when the line was extended north to San Isidro. This station provides access to Los Andes Mall

Los Andes station is located in San Miguelito District, at the intersection of Highway 3 and Avenida de Los Andes.
