= Isidoro Ruiz =

Mexican politician

- Born: 19 June 1955 (age 70); Mexico City, Mexico
- Occupation: Politician
- Political party: PRD

Isidoro Ruiz Argaiz (born 19 June 1955) is a Mexican politician affiliated with the Party of the Democratic Revolution. As of 2014 he served as Deputy of the LIX Legislature of the Mexican Congress as a plurinominal representative.
