= San Isidro metro station =

Panama metro station

Estación San Isidro
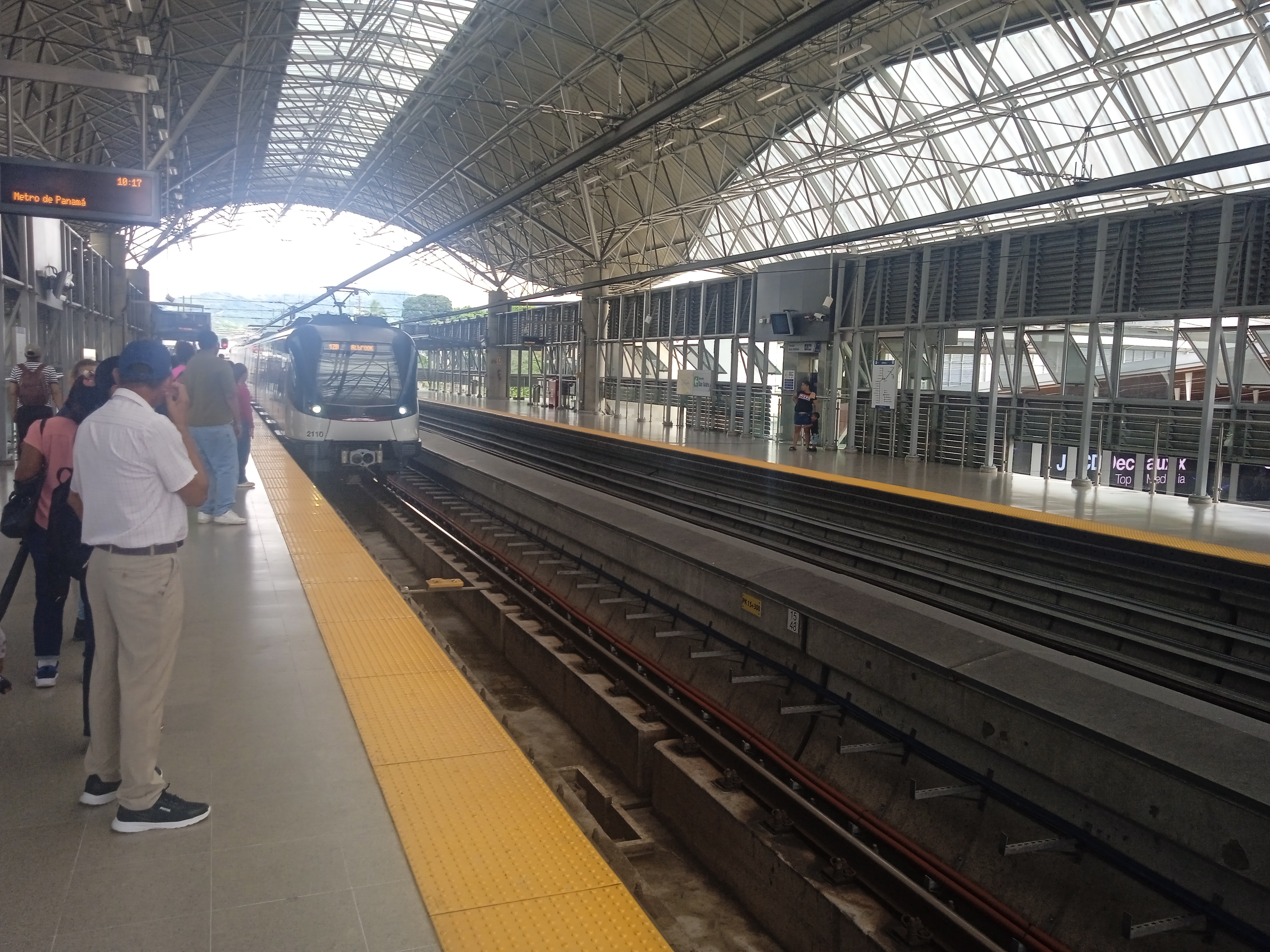

General information
- Location: San Isidro, San Miguelito; Panama City; Panama
- Coordinates: 9°03′54″N 79°30′51″W
- System: Panama Metro station
- Line: Line 1
- Platforms: 2

History
- Opened: 15 August 2015; 11 years ago

Services
Preceding station	Panama Metro	Following station
Los Andes toward Albrook	Line 1	Villa Zaita Terminus
Location

San Isidro is a Panama Metro station on Line 1. It was open on 15 August 2015 as the northern terminus of an extension of Line 1 from Los Andes. On 25 April 2024, the line was extended to Villa Zaita, and San Isidro ceased to be the terminus. It is an elevated station.

San Isidro station is located in San Miguelito District, above Highway 3, in San Isidro neighborhood.
