= Isador Sobel =

American lawyer

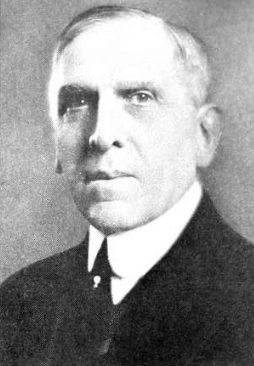
- Born: August 28, 1858; New York, New York, US
- Died: October 25, 1939 (aged 81); Erie, Pennsylvania, US
- Occupation: Lawyer
- Political party: Republican
- Spouse: Emma Auerhaim (m. 1891)
- Children: 3

Isador Sobel (August 28, 1858 – October 25, 1939) was a Jewish-American lawyer from Pennsylvania.

== Life ==
Sobel was born on August 28, 1858, in New York City, New York, the son of merchant Semel Sobel and Cecelia King. His parents were both German immigrants.

Sobel moved with his family to Erie, Pennsylvania, in 1874. He attended public school in New York City and Erie, and was in the College of the City of New York from 1873 to 1876. He was associated with his father in the mercantile business from 1876 to 1886. During that time, he also worked as a clerk in a department store Niagara Falls, New York, and twice entered the mercantile business himself (once in Erie and once in Clarendon, Pennsylvania). In 1886, he began studying law under Samuel M. Brainerd in Erie. He was admitted to the Pennsylvania bar in 1888 and formed the law firm Brainerd & Sobel with Brainerd. The firm ended in 1892 and he practiced alone for the next six years. He formed a partnership with Justin P. Slocum in 1898, although the partnership was dissolved shortly afterwards. He then practiced law alone until 1919, when his son Jeffrey Mortimer joined his practice. The association ended in 1933, after which he practiced alone for the rest of his life. He had a general law practice, although he focused on commercial and bankruptcy law and to a lesser extent corporation law. He conducted a real estate and insurance business from 1914 to 1916. He organized the Sidney Oil Co. in 1918 and the Norman Oil Co. in 1920, and after the companies prospected for and struck oil and Kentucky they were sold to subsidiaries of Standard Oil Co. He purchased land in Vero Beach, Florida, in 1925 and maintained a real estate office there with his son Amos Sobel from 1925 to 1926.

Sobel was secretary of the Republican county committee from 1889 to 1891 and its chairman from 1893 to 1896. He was vice-president of the League of Republican Clubs of Pennsylvania from 1894 to 1895 and its president from 1896 to 1897. In 1891, he was elected to the Erie common council, representing the First Ward. He was re-elected in 1893, and in 1894 he became president of the common council. In 1896, he served as chairman of the executive committee which was in charge of the campaign in Erie County, was the Republican candidate for mayor, and was the 1896 presidential elector for William McKinley. In 1898, President McKinley appointed him postmaster of Erie. He was reappointed to the office by President Theodore Roosevelt in 1902 and 1906 and by President William Howard Taft in 1910. In 1908, he served as president of the Postmasters' Association of Pennsylvania. He was elected president of the National Association of Postmasters of First-Class Offices of the United States in 1912, and a year later became its first honorary president.

Early in Sobel's life, he wrote the weekly Jewish news of Erie for The American Israelite. He was an active organizer and director of the Progress Social Club. In 1906, he organized the Erie Lodge of the Independent Order of B'nai B'rith (which was later named after him) and served as its first president (an office he held for the rest of his life). In the 1910, he was elected to the Order's General Committee. From 1910 to 1912, he was president of the District Grand Lodge. While serving in the latter position, the B'nai B'rith Home for Children was established, and he served as its president until his death. He was also a member of the Order's Constitutional Grand Lodge. When the American Jewish Committee was founded, he was one of the fifty original members, an incorporator, an Executive Committee member for twelve years, and chairman of the organizing committee that set up subordinate units (known as Advisory Councils) throughout the country. He was a member of the National Council of the Joint Distribution Committee. He was made an honorary member of Zeta Beta Tau.

Sobel was general chairman of the Erie Community Chest Campaign from 1921 to 1922, honorary chairman of the Erie Jewish Association, a director and corporator of the Hamot Hospital, and president of the Erie County Bar Association. He was a member of the Pennsylvania Bar Association, the Freemasons, the Shriners, the Odd Fellows, the American Jewish Historical Society, the Jewish Publication Society, and the Knights of Pythias. He was president of Temple Anshe Hesed. In 1891, he married Emma Auerhaim of Bradford. Their children were Jeffrey Mortimer, Norman Tyler, and Sidney Amos.

Sobel died in Erie on October 25, 1939.
