= Isidoro (footballer, born 1953) =

Brazilian footballer

Personal information
- Full name: Raimundo Isidoro da Silva
- Date of birth: 2 January 1953 (age 73)
- Place of birth: Viçosa, Brazil
- Position: Defender

Youth career
- ESAB

Senior career*
Years	Team	Apps	(Gls)
1975–1977	Cruzeiro	44	(1)
1977–1978	Coritiba		
1979	Fluminense	31	(1)
1979–1980	Inter de Limeira		
1981–1983	Santa Cruz		
1982	→ Paysandu (loan)		
1983	Remo		
1984–1985	Tupi		
1986–1988	Volta Redonda		
- * Club domestic league appearances and goals as of 22 January 2024

Raimundo Isidoro da Silva (born 2 January 1953), better known as Isidoro, is a Brazilian former professional footballer who played as a defender.

== Career ==
Isidoro played for Cruzeiro as his first professional club, and was part of the state champion squads in 1975 and 1977, the Brazilian runner-up in 1975, and the 1976 Copa Libertadores. He also won the state championship in Pará, in 1982 with Paysandu.

Interestingly, Isidoro celebrates his anniversary on the same day as the founding of Cruzeiro Esporte Clube.

== Honours ==
Cruzeiro

- Copa Libertadores: 1976
- Campeonato Mineiro: 1975, 1977

Paysandu

- Campeonato Paraense: 1982
