= Felipe González =

Prime Minister of Spain from 1982 to 1996

The Most Excellent Felipe González
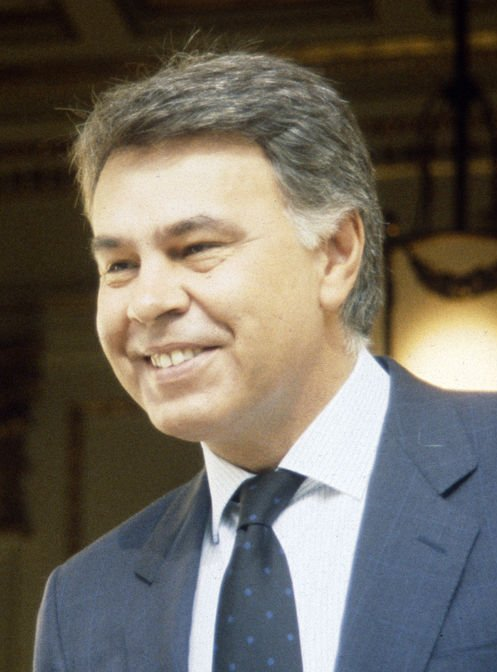
- González in 1991

Prime Minister of Spain
- In office 2 December 1982 – 5 May 1996
- Monarch: Juan Carlos I
- Deputy: Alfonso Guerra; Narcís Serra
- Preceded by: Leopoldo Calvo-Sotelo
- Succeeded by: José María Aznar

Secretary-General of the Spanish Socialist Workers' Party
- In office 28 September 1979 – 21 June 1997
- President: Ramón Rubial
- Deputy: Alfonso Guerra
- Preceded by: Caretaker committee
- Succeeded by: Joaquín Almunia
- In office 13 October 1974 – 20 May 1979
- President: Ramón Rubial (1976–1979)
- Preceded by: Rodolfo Llopis
- Succeeded by: Caretaker committee

Leader of the Opposition
- In office 5 May 1996 – 21 June 1997
- Prime Minister: José María Aznar
- Preceded by: José María Aznar
- Succeeded by: Joaquín Almunia

Member of the Congress of Deputies
- In office 29 March 2000 – 2 April 2004
- Constituency: Seville
- In office 2 July 1977 – 5 April 2000
- Constituency: Madrid

Personal details
- Born: Felipe González Márquez; 5 March 1942 (age 84) Seville, Spain
- Party: Spanish Socialist Workers' Party
- Spouses: Carmen Romero López (m. 1969; div. 2008) Mar García Vaquero (m. 2012)
- Children: 3
- Education: University of Seville
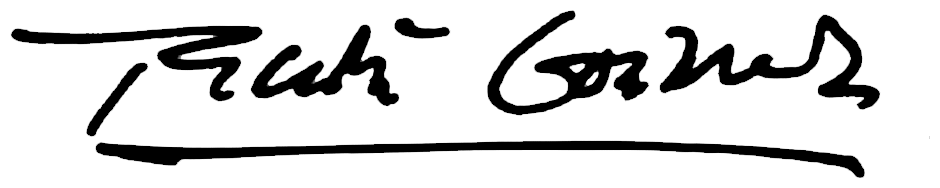
- Signature

Felipe González Márquez (Spanish: [feˈlipe ɣonˈθaleθ ˈmaɾkeθ]; born 5 March 1942) is a retired Spanish politician who was Prime Minister of Spain from 1982 to 1996 and leader of the Spanish Socialist Workers' Party from 1974 to 1997. He is the longest-serving democratically elected prime minister of Spain.

González joined the PSOE in 1964 when it was banned under the Francoist regime. He obtained a law degree from the University of Seville in 1965. In 1974, the PSOE elected González as its secretary-general after a split in its 26th Congress. He led the party through the Spanish transition to democracy, carrying it to a strong second-place finish in the 1977 general election, making the PSOE the main opposition to the ruling Union of the Democratic Centre, a position it maintained in 1979.

After the PSOE victory in the 1982 general election, González formed his first majority government, backed by 202 out of the 350 deputies at the Congress of Deputies, and led the government of Spain for thirteen and a half years after three additional victories in the 1986, 1989 and 1993 general elections. In 1996, González lost the election to José María Aznar and the People's Party and was elected to the Congress of Deputies for the last time in the 2000 general election, from Seville.

== Early life ==
González was born in Bellavista, Seville, the son of a small dairy farmer. He has a sister called Lola González Márquez, married to Francisco Germán Palomino Romera, by whom she has two sons, Felipe and Germán Palomino González. He studied law at the University of Seville and started his career as an attorney specialising in labour law. While at the university he met members of the clandestine socialist trade union Unión General de Trabajadores (UGT). He also contacted members of the PSOE and started taking part in the party's clandestine activity, necessary under the dictatorship of Franco. During that time he adopted the alias Isidoro and moved to Madrid. He was elected secretary general of the Party at the Suresnes Congress, in France.

By the time of Franco's death, González had become the most prominent figure among the left wing of the democratic opposition to the regime, and played a critical role, along with then serving prime minister Adolfo Suárez, in the Spanish transition to democracy. During the Suárez government, General and Deputy Prime Minister Manuel Gutiérrez Mellado asked González not to raise the debate of the Civil War and Francoist repression until the death of those of his generation.

In the first democratic general election after Franco's death, held in 1977, the PSOE became the second most-voted for party, and this served González to appear as a young, active and promising leader. However, he did not win the 1979 election and had to wait for 1982 and the dissolution of the Union of the Democratic Centre party to come into office.

== Premiership (1982–1996) ==
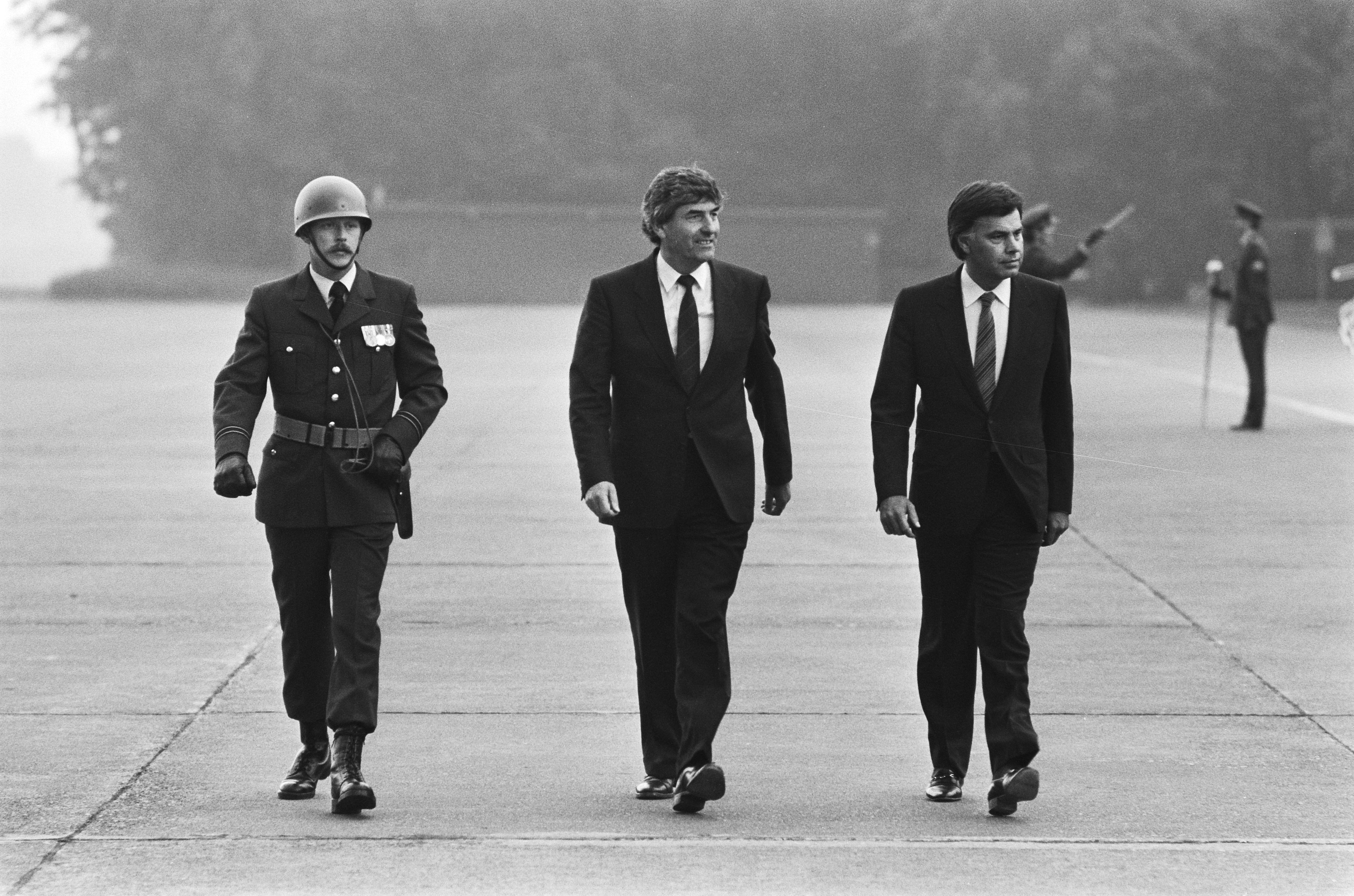
Felipe González (right) arriving at Ypenburg Airport with Ruud Lubbers, Prime Minister of the Netherlands, 1985

In the 1982 general election held on 28 October 1982, the PSOE gained 48.1% of the vote and 202 deputies (out of 350). On 2 December, González became President of the Government of Spain, with Alfonso Guerra as his deputy. He was the first socialist to hold the post since the Spanish Civil War, and his government was the first since then in which none of its members had served under Francoism.

With a large majority in the Congress of Deputies, popularly known as "the roller" (Spanish: el rodillo), González's election was met with tremendous expectation of change amongst Spaniards. Under his government, a wide range of social reforms were introduced. Various labor measures were passed, university education was reformed and expanded, the social security system was extended and a partial legalisation of abortion became law for the first time, despite opposition from the Catholic Church. González pushed for reforms and a restructuring of the economy.

Also, from 1982 to 1994, Spanish social expenditure as a percentage of the European level rose from 63.7% to 87.6%.

On 23 February 1983, the Government passed a law nationalising the company Rumasa, a private business that included merchant banking interests, on the grounds that it was at the point of bankruptcy and the government needed to protect the savings of depositors and the jobs of its 60,000 employees, a decision that aroused considerable criticism and a judicial conflict over the law that was only resolved, in favour of the government, in December 1986.

In the 1986 general election held on 22 June 1986, the PSOE gained 44.1% of the vote and 184 deputies in Parliament. González was elected prime minister for the second time. During this second term, Spain joined the European Economic Community (EEC) in 1986. González supported Spain remaining in NATO that same year in a referendum reversing his and the party's earlier anti-NATO position.

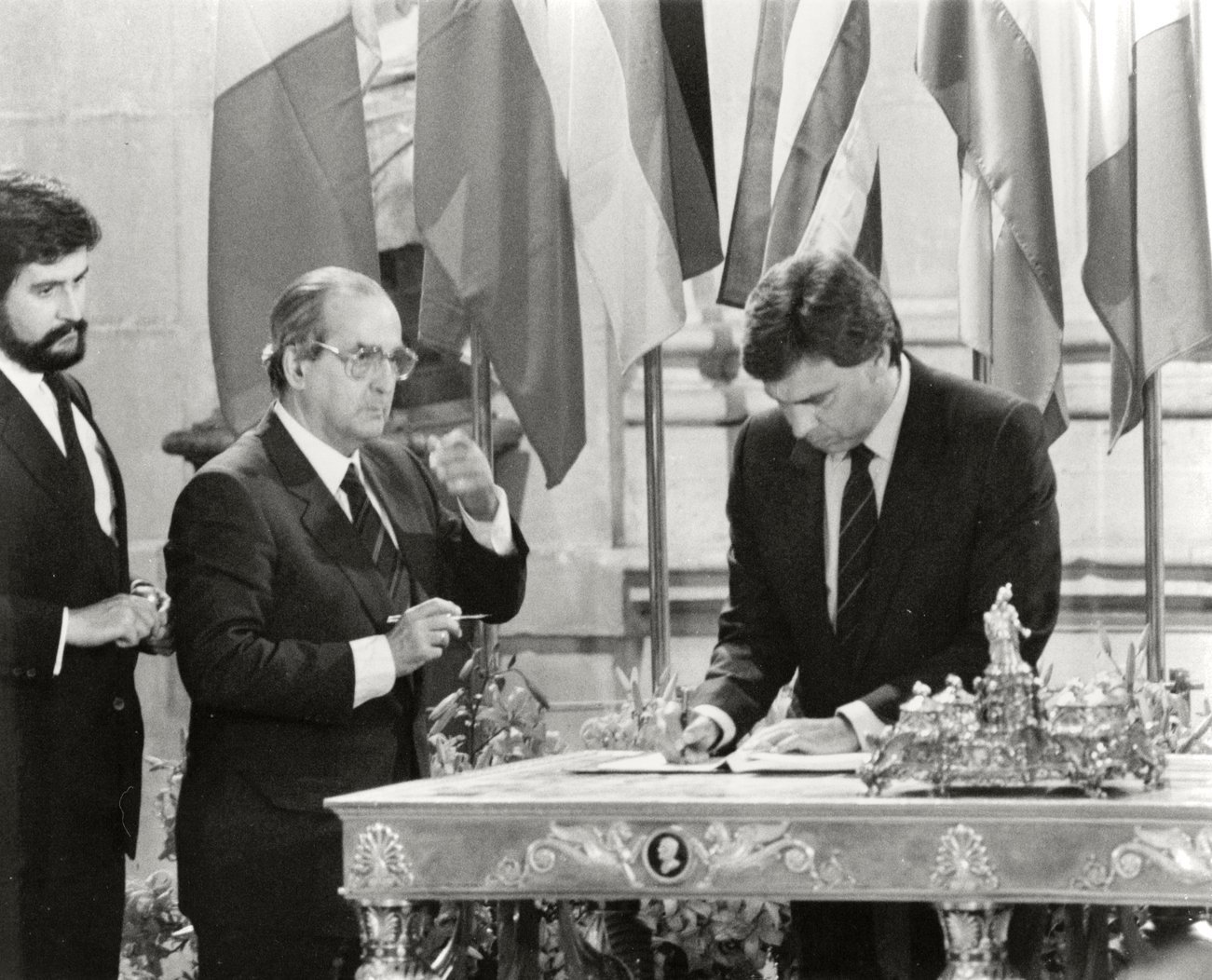
Felipe González during the signing of the Treaty of Accession to the European Economic Community

On 29 October 1989, he won the 1989 general election with 39.6% of the vote and 175 seats, his third successive mandate. However, he lost the outright majority he had held since 1982.

On 6 June 1993, González won the 1993 general election with 38.8% of the vote and 159 deputies. His fourth victory was marred by the fact he was forced to form a pact with nationalist political parties from Catalonia and Basque country in order to form a new government.

Towards the end of 1995, there was a debate about whether González should lead the PSOE in the forthcoming general elections. The People's Party intensified its campaign to associate his period in office with a poor economic situation (although unemployment had begun to decline and the economic reforms of the previous decade initiated a lasting period of economic growth) and with accusations of corruption and state terrorism scandals, including allegations of waging a dirty war against the terrorist group ETA by means of the GAL. There was speculation in the press about Javier Solana as a possible replacement, but Solana was appointed Secretary General of NATO in December 1995.

In June 2020, the CIA declassified information confirming that González had authorised the creation of the GAL.

Left with no other suitable candidate, the party was again led by González and in the 1996 general election held on 3 March 1996, they gained 37.4% of the vote and 141 deputies. They lost the election to the People's Party whose leader José María Aznar replaced González as prime minister (presidente in Spanish, not to be confused with the English use of the term) on 4 or 5 May 1996.

The Gonzalez government left behind a deep impact on the Spanish real economy, such as the expansion of the networks of highways and airports and the creation of new infrastructures, including high-speed rail in Spain. Gonzalez-led cabinets were the first to implement a national, comprehensive infrastructure program that included not only public works but also theatres, museums, and secondary schools. In addition, a comprehensive welfare state was established, while improvements were made to social programmes such as pensions and unemployment benefits. A 40-hour workweek was introduced, while entitlement to paid holidays was extended to up to 30 days per year. Pension funds were also established, together with provisions for social tourism. In addition, the school-leaving age was raised from 14 to 16, while the number of educational grants was multiplied by eight.

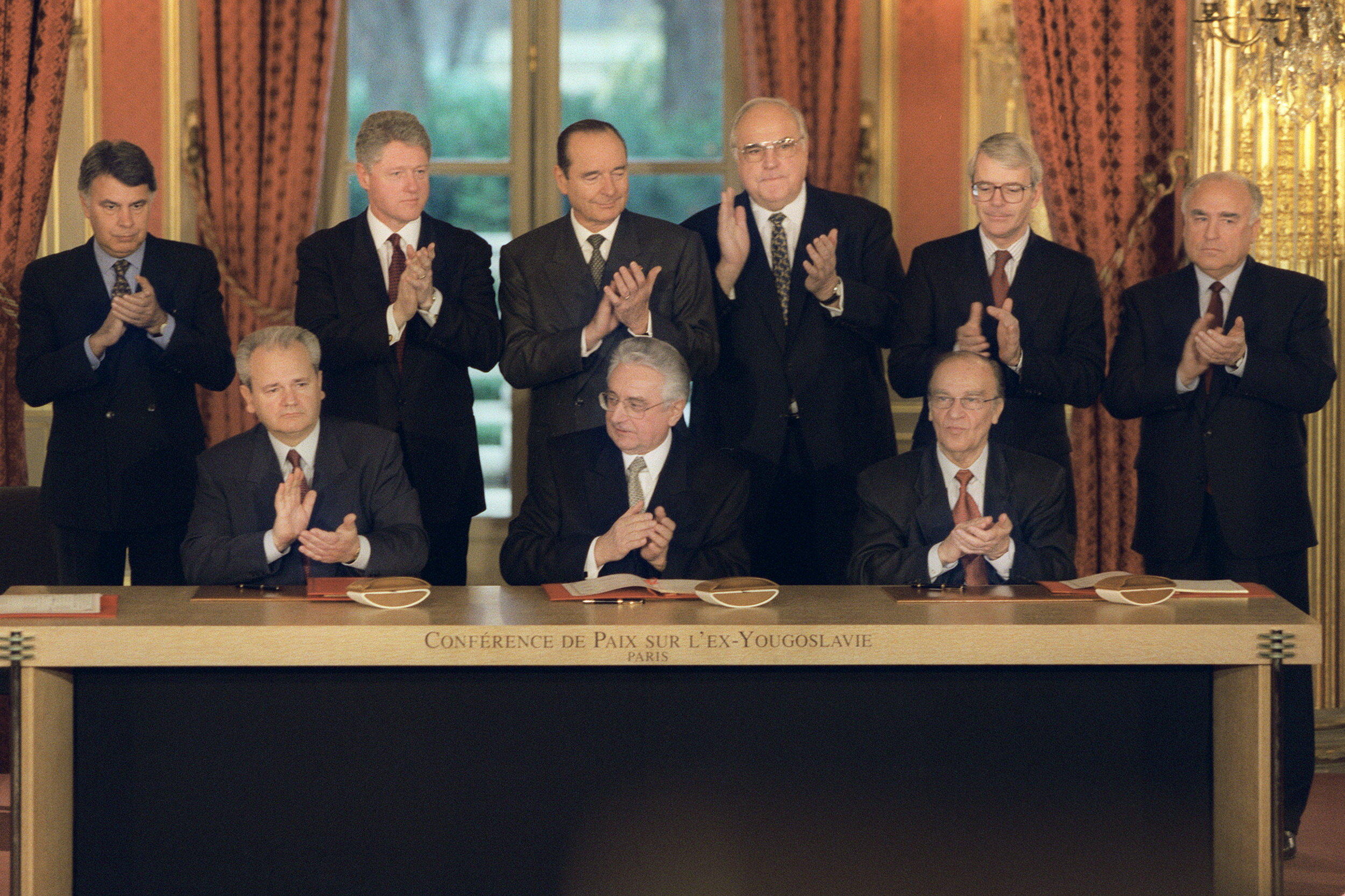
Felipe González as signatory of the Dayton Agreement, in Paris on 14 December 1995, as President of the European Council

Unemployment protection was expanded and a national education system for children under the age of six was established. Cash benefits in social housing, universal healthcare and education were introduced, along with earnings-based benefits for widowhood, sickness, disability and retirement. A Ministry of Social Affairs was also set up, allowing for social services to be decentralised in the early Nineties and to be available to all citizens, rather than only to those with social security.

The pension system was extended to needy people, universal public schooling was expanded for all children under the age of 16, and new universities were established. Healthcare was reformed, with Gonzalez creating the National Health Service and accelerating the development of primary care medicine based on health centres, where integral primary care for adults, pregnant women and paediatric patients was provided. Gonzalez presided over an increase in youth and women's participation in government. State-run Televisión Española reached a high level of quality under the direction of Pilar Miró. Private television channels were also permitted in 1990, ending the state monopoly.

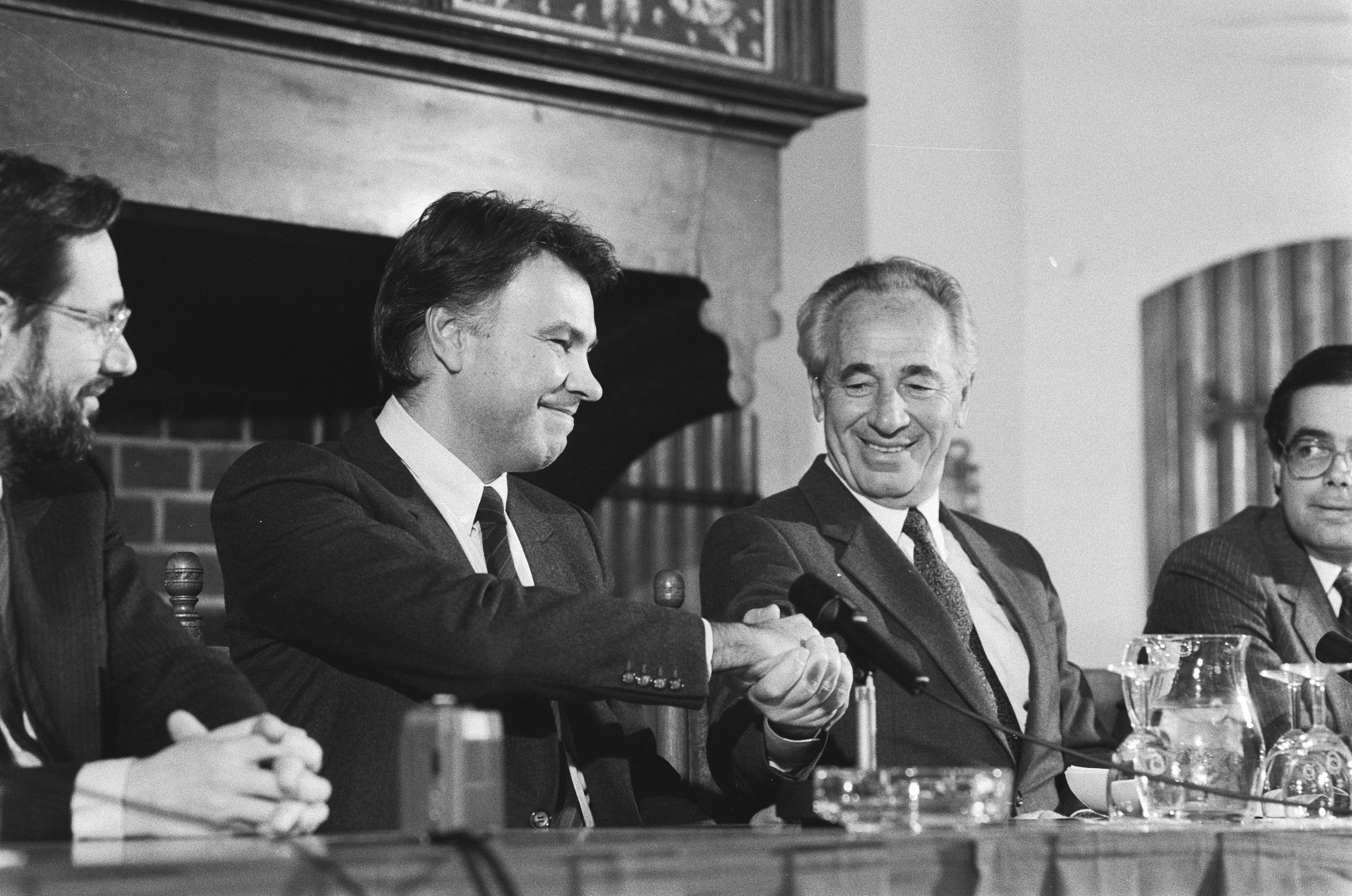
González meets Shimon Peres in 1986, establishing diplomatic relations between Spain and Israel, a historic step that would lead to the Madrid Conference of 1991 peace talks between Israel and Palestine

González also secured Spain's entry into the EEC, which the country joined in 1986, and consolidated democratic government. Together with François Mitterrand and Helmut Kohl, he revitalized efforts to push for European integration and extension of state power. He was a supporter of Kohl's drive for a united Germany, counteracting British and French hostility.

González also started diplomatic relations with Israel, which had never been established by Franco because of antisemitism. Franco's successor Adolfo Suárez also refused to recognize Israel, while González' predecessor Leopoldo Calvo-Sotelo would also fail to establish relations with Israel. Gonzalez's time as Prime Minister of Spain also marked a significant reversal in Spain's relations with Israel, with González even becoming the first Spanish head of state to visit Israel in December 1991. He had also previously visited Israel in the 1970s under an assumed name. Spain and Israel would establish diplomatic relations on 17 January 1986. Due to his prestige, Spain also hosted the Madrid Conference of 1991 peace talks between Palestinians and Israelis; these were chaired by President George H. W. Bush of the United States and Soviet president Mikhail Gorbachev. The bilateral Israeli–Palestinian negotiations eventually led to the exchange of letters and the subsequent signing of the Oslo I Accord, on the lawn of the White House on 13 September 1993. The negotiations that emanated from the Madrid conference, led to the Israel–Jordan peace treaty in 1994. The Israeli–Syrian negotiations included a series of follow-on meetings, which according to some reports, came quite close, but failed to result in a peace treaty.

In the fight against terrorism, an intense police campaign secured several victories that left the terrorist organisation ETA severely debilitated. In his earlier years ETA killings totalled dozens per year (the 1987 Hipercor bombing attack in Barcelona alone killed more than 10 people), while in his latter years ETA killed far fewer. During his time as prime minister a group called GAL was active as a gangster-style force targeting etarras (ETA members). Several innocent people were killed and the subsequent investigations ended with some police officers and the Minister of Internal Affairs, José Barrionuevo, condemned to jail. The Constitutional Court later ratified the sentence. Among successful operations were the capture of the ETA central arsenal and archives in Sokoa (France) and the capture of the organisation's ruling body in 1992.

However, in the final years of his mandate several cases of corruption, the most notable of which were the scandals involving Civil Guard Director Luis Roldán, further eroded popular support for the PSOE. Nonetheless, González and most of his ministers generally managed to leave office with their reputations intact, although they had performed poor oversight of some lower-ranking public servants, according to María Antonia Iglesias (La memoria recuperada. Lo que nunca han contado Felipe González y los dirigentes socialistas, 2003); Iglesias is very close, though, to the PSOE official line, as she served as head of the public TV broadcaster Televisión Española after appointment to the post by one of Gonzalez's cabinets.

== Post-premiership (1996–present) ==
González ended his fourth term on 5 May 1996. Since September 1996, he has headed the Madrid-based Global Progress Foundation (FPG). At the beginning of the 34th PSOE National Congress on 20 June 1997 he surprisingly resigned as leader of the party. He also resigned from the federal executive committee, though retaining his seat in the Congress. With no clear successor, he continued to exert enormous influence over the party. He was only replaced at the 35th party Congress in July 2000 when José Luis Rodríguez Zapatero became the leader.

In 1996, González was the head of the OSCE delegation which was sent to Federal Republic of Yugoslavia as a mediator in the dialogue between Serbian government and the opposition, following the mass protests which had started over the alleged electoral fraud at the 1996 Serbian local elections.

In 1997, he was considered a leading candidate to take over the position of President of the European Commission after Jacques Santer. The position ultimately went to Italy's Romano Prodi.

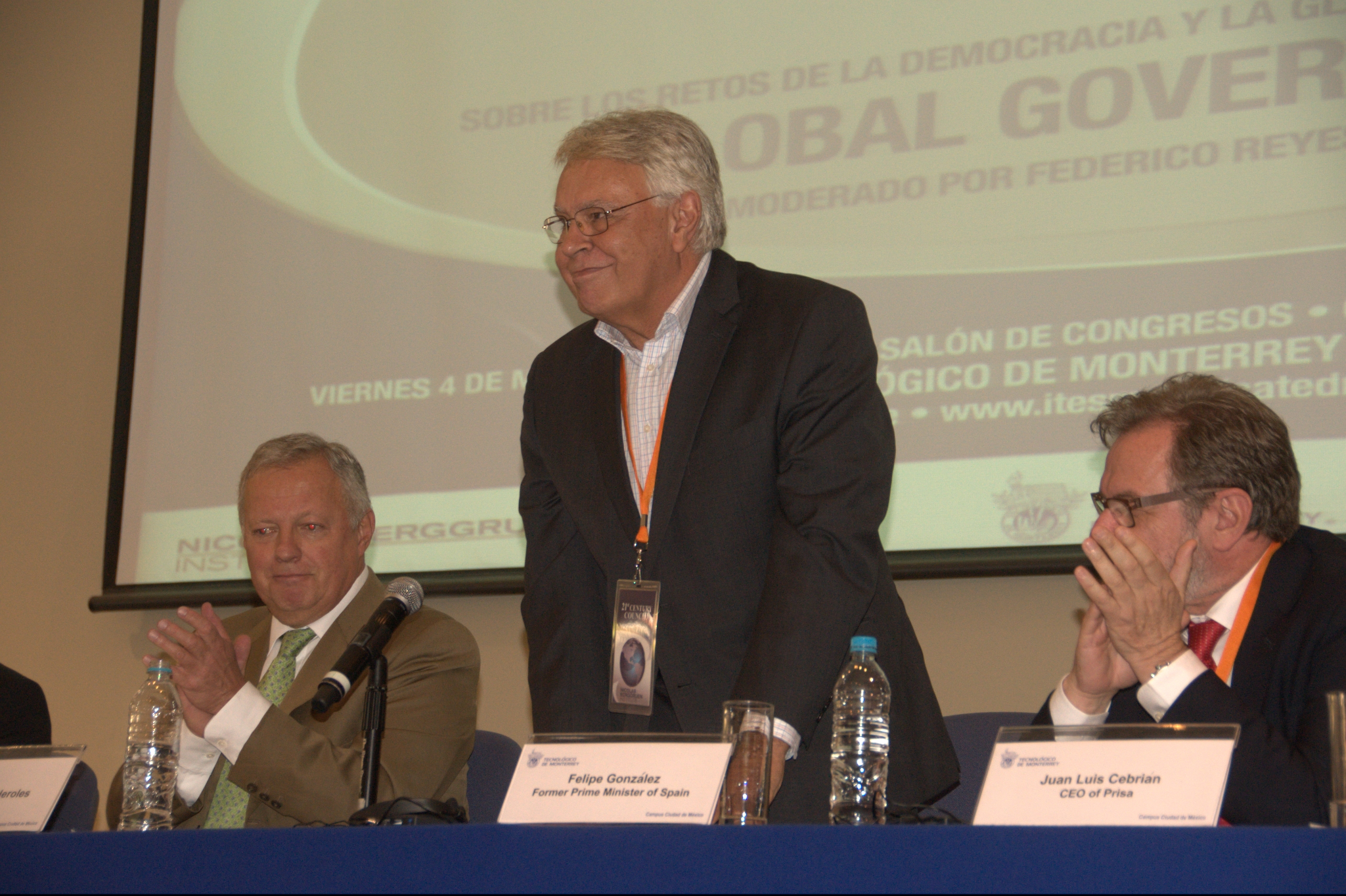
Gonzalez at the Global Governance event at Monterrey Institute of Technology and Higher Education, Mexico City 2012

In 1999, González was put in charge of the party's Global Progress Commission in response to globalisation. The commission's report formed the basis of the closing declaration of the 21st Socialist International Congress on 8–9 November 1999. In the 2004 general elections, González stood down as a deputy in the Spanish Parliament.

On 27 July 2007, the Spanish government appointed him a plenipotentiary and extraordinary ambassador for the bicentenary celebrations in commemoration of the independence of Latin America. The celebrations began in September 2010 in Mexico.

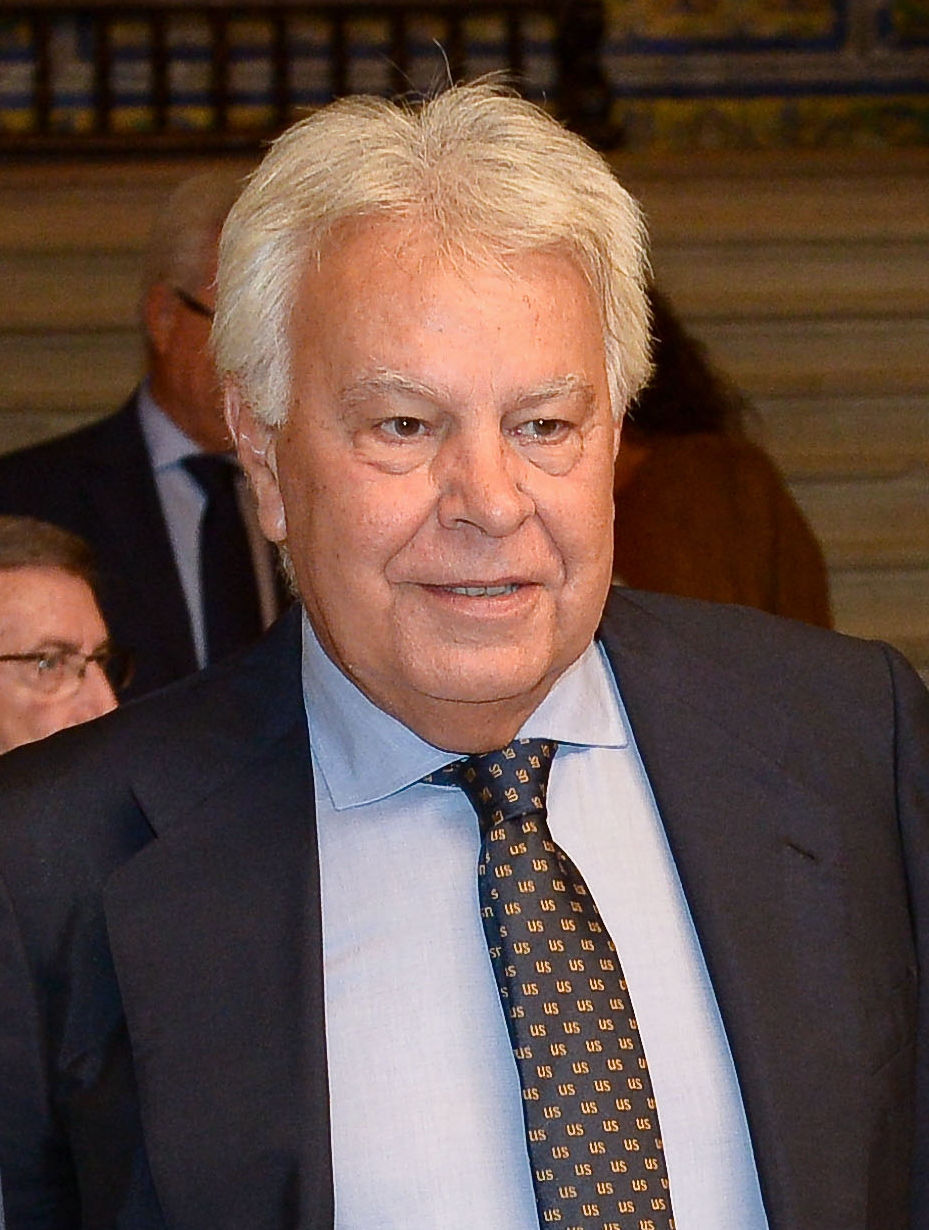
Felipe González (2014)

At a summit held in Brussels on 14 December 2007, heads of state and government of European Union member states appointed González chairman of a think tank on the future of Europe. The group, consisting of up to nine prestigious personalities commissioned to draw up a report, by June 2010, on the challenges facing the European Union from 2020 to 2030, will also look at how to achieve a closer understanding between citizens and the Union.

In December 2014, Colombian president Juan Manuel Santos granted González Colombian nationality.

From 2010 to 2015, González was appointed independent director in Gas Natural-Fenosa, one of the leading energy companies in Spain, being one of the best-known high-profile cases of revolving doors in Spanish politics.

Since 2015, he has taken an active role in criticising the emerging party Podemos, which he considers a populist threat, and has actively lobbied the PSOE against approaching Podemos for any possible government coalition. González supported PSOE candidate Pedro Sánchez in the 2015 and 2016 general elections, but in the aftermath Sánchez announced talks with Podemos and Catalan separatist parties. González then supported Susana Diaz faction in a bitter internal struggle which ended with PSOE facilitating the investiture of the conservative government and the dismissal of Pedro Sánchez.

In 2015, González travelled to Venezuela to support Leopoldo López and other imprisoned opposition leaders. His involvement came at the same time mainstream media and political parties were accusing emerging Podemos of having links with the Venezuelan government.

González is a member of the Club of Madrid, an independent non-profit organisation composed of 81 democratic former presidents and prime ministers from 57 different countries.

In 2015, González was awarded the Distinguished Leadership Award for Public Service in the Americas Award by the Inter-American Dialogue for his tireless, effective, and ongoing public service and commitment to democracy in Latin America.

In October 2025, King Felipe VI named him Knight of the Order of the Golden Fleece.

== Personal life ==
González married María del Carmen Julia Romero y López in Seville on 16 July 1969 and has three children: Pablo González Romero, David González Romero and María González Romero (lawyer). He divorced Carmen Romero in 2008. In 2012, he married Mar García Vaquero.

One of his hobbies is tending bonsai trees. During his tenure at Moncloa, he received and cultivated several of them, mostly Mediterranean species, that he later donated to the Royal Botanic Garden of Madrid.

His wife Mar García Vaquero is named in the Panama Papers scandal in 2016.

== Published works ==
- "Un discurso ético" (co-authorship with Víctor Márquez Reviriego, 1982).
- "El Socialismo" (1997).
- "El futuro no es lo que era" (co-authorship with Juan Luis Cebrián, 2002).
- "Memorias del futuro" (2003).
- "Mi idea de Europa" (2011).

== See also ==
- Governments of Felipe González
- History of Spain
- List of prime ministers of Spain
- Politics of Spain

Party political offices
Preceded by Rodolfo Llopis	Secretary-General of the Spanish Socialist Workers' Party; 1974–1979	Succeeded by Caretaker committee led by José Federico de Carvajal
Preceded by Caretaker committee led by José Federico de Carvajal	Secretary-General of the Spanish Socialist Workers' Party; 1979–1997	Succeeded by Joaquín Almunia
Political offices
Preceded by Leopoldo Calvo-Sotelo	Prime Minister of Spain; 1982–1996	Succeeded by José María Aznar
Preceded by José María Aznar	Leader of the Opposition; 1996–1997	Succeeded by Joaquín Almunia
Awards
Preceded by Jacques Delors	Laureate of the Charlemagne Prize; 1993	Succeeded by Gro Harlem Brundtland
