= List of storms named Isidore =

The name Isidore was used for four tropical cyclones in the Atlantic Ocean.

- Tropical Storm Isidore (1984) – made landfall at Andros Island in the Bahamas and then crossed central Florida, causing US$750,000 in damage.
- Hurricane Isidore (1990) – Category 2 hurricane that remained over the open ocean.
- Hurricane Isidore (1996) – Category 3 that never made landfall.
- Hurricane Isidore (2002) – Category 3 hurricane that struck western Cuba and the Yucatán causing $330 million in damage and seven deaths.

Isidore was retired after the 2002 hurricane season and replaced with Ike for the 2008 season.
