= Isidro González =

Spanish fencer

Personal information
- Full name: Isidro González de Mendoza Crespo
- Born: 15 October 1907

Sport
- Country: Spain
- Sport: Fencing

Isidro González (born 15 October 1907, date of death unknown) was a Spanish fencer. He competed in the individual sabre event at the 1928 Summer Olympics. He went 1–3 in the Sabre, Individual Men's event with his only win against Henri Brasseur of Belgium.
