= Isidro Rico =

Mexican marathon runner

José Isidro Rico Rangel (born May 15, 1961) is a former marathon runner from Mexico, whose personal best in the classic distance was 2:09:14 (1994). He represented his native country at the 1992 Summer Olympics, finishing in 29th place in the Men's Marathon.

== Achievements ==
| Year | Competition | Venue | Position | Event | Notes |
Representing Mexico
| 1990 | Boston Marathon | Boston, United States | 6th | Marathon | 2:13:02 |
| 1991 | Houston Marathon | Houston, United States | 4th | Marathon | 2:13:47 |
| 1991 | London Marathon | London, United Kingdom | 17th | Marathon | 2:12:38 |
| 1991 | New York City Marathon | New York City, United States | 5th | Marathon | 2:11:58 |
| 1992 | Rotterdam Marathon | Rotterdam, the Netherlands | 2nd | Marathon | 2:09:28 |
| 1992 | Olympic Games | Barcelona, Spain | 29th | Marathon | 2:18:52 |
| 1992 | Fukuoka Marathon | Fukuoka, Japan | 12th | Marathon | 2:13:59 |
| 1993 | London Marathon | London, United Kingdom | 2nd | Marathon | 2:10:53 |
| 1993 | Fukuoka Marathon | Fukuoka, Japan | 7th | Marathon | 2:10:45 |
| 1994 | Seoul International Marathon | Seoul, South Korea | 3rd | Marathon | 2:09:14 |
| 1994 | New York City Marathon | New York City, United States | 8th | Marathon | 2:13:22 |
| 1995 | Boston Marathon | Boston, United States | 11th | Marathon | 2:13:10 |
| 1995 | World Championships | Gothenburg, Sweden | 15th | Marathon | 2:18:29 |
| 1996 | Paris Marathon | Paris, France | 2nd | Marathon | 2:12:21 |
| 1996 | Cancún Marathon | Cancún, Mexico | 3rd | Marathon | 2:14:11 |
| 1997 | Lake Biwa Marathon | Ōtsu, Japan | 7th | Marathon | 2:11:39 |
| 1997 | World Championships | Athens, Greece | — | Marathon | DNF |
| 1998 | Los Angeles Marathon | Los Angeles, United States | 7th | Marathon | 2:13:58 |
| 1998 | New York City Marathon | New York City, United States | 17th | Marathon | 2:15:52 |
| 1999 | Torreón La Laguna Marathon | Torreón, Mexico | 3rd | Marathon | 2:16:49 |
