= Isidro Ancheta =

Filipino artist

- Born: October 15, 1882; San Miguel, Bulacan, Captaincy General of the Philippines
- Died: 1946 (aged 63–64)
- Known for: Painting

Isidro Ancheta (October 15, 1882 – 1946) was a Filipino landscape painter. He finished his Elementary, Secondary and Bachelor of Arts Degree (1904) at the Ateneo de Manila. He also studied at the Liceo de Manila, Escuela de Pintura, Escultura y Grabado and the Academia de Dibujo y Pintura run by Teodoro Buenaventura in the early 1900s. He was represented with 8 paintings in the Philippine Section at the St. Louis Exposition of 1904, where his painting titled A Victim of War received an Honorable Mention. He taught at the Philippine Normal School from 1918 to 1926. Before World War II, his landscapes were found in classrooms all over the Philippines. In 1941 his Tienda del Barrio won Second Honorable Mention in the Filipiniana Category at the National Art Competition sponsored by the University of Santo Tomas.
