= St. Isidore =

St. Isidore or Saint-Isidore may refer to:

== People ==
- Isidore of Chios (d. 251), martyr from Roman Egypt
- Isidore of Scété (died c. 390), Egyptian priest and desert ascetic
- Isidore of Pelusium (d. c. 450), monk from Roman Egypt
- Isidore of Seville (c. 560–636), scholar and Archbishop of Seville, Spain
- Isidore the Laborer (c. 1070–1130), peasant and patron saint of Madrid, Spain

== Places ==
=== Canada ===
- St. Isidore, Alberta
- St. Isidore, Ontario
- St. Isidore-de-Bellevue, Saskatchewan
- Saint-Isidore, New Brunswick
- Saint-Isidore Parish, New Brunswick
- Saint-Isidore, Montérégie, Quebec
- Saint-Isidore-de-Clifton, Quebec
- Saint-Isidore, Chaudière-Appalaches, Quebec

=== Elsewhere ===
- Church of St. Isidore, Renavas, Lithuania
- St. Isidore Island, Antarctica
- St Isidore's, Queensland, Australia, a homestead
- St. Isidore Cathedral, Holguín, Cuba
- St. Isidore Catholic Church, Los Alamitos, United States
- Saint Isidore Cemetery, Madrid, Spain

== See also ==
- San Isidro (disambiguation)
