= Temple Anshe Hesed =

Reform Jewish synagogue in Pennsylvania, US

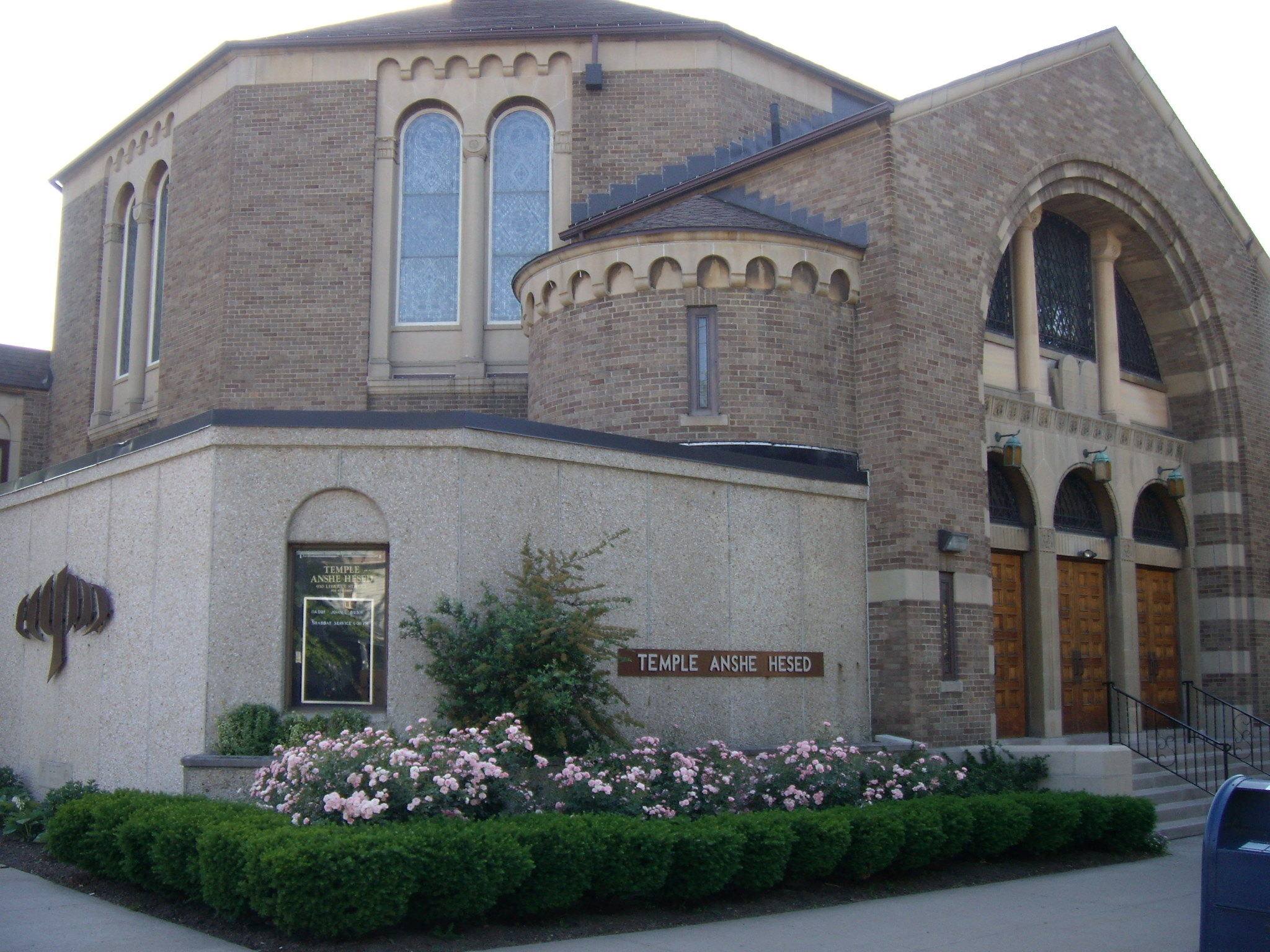
- Temple Anshe Hesed's former location on Tenth Street, as seen in 2007

- Location in Pennsylvania

Religion
- Affiliation: Reform Judaism
- Ecclesiastical or organisational status: Synagogue
- Status: Active

Location
- Location: 5401 Old Zuck Road in Erie, Pennsylvania
- Country: United States
- Coordinates: 42°07′10″N 80°06′00″W

Architecture
- Style: Synagogue
- Established: 1862 (as a congregation)
- Completed: 1882 (West Eighth Street); 1930 (Tenth Street); 2018 (Old Zuck Road)

Website
- taherie.or

Temple Anshe Hesed is a Reform Jewish synagogue located at 5401 Old Zuck Road in Erie, Pennsylvania, in the United States. The congregation is affiliated with the Union for Reform Judaism.

== History ==
Anshe Hesed, once spelled as Anschai Chesed, "was incorporated on 23 May 1862 and organized as a classical Reform congregation on October 24, 1875, making it one of the oldest Reform communities in Pennsylvania." The synagogue's name literally means "people of benevolence" (or kindness) in Hebrew.

In his history of the region, Samuel Bates reports that eight to ten members of this congregation began meeting in 1858. Members first met in an upstairs room at the corner of Fifth Street and French Street (the Lyons property) and subsequently met in temporary facilities on French Street, Holland Street, State Street; and then at another location on French Street.

Built in 1882, the congregation's first synagogue was "a brick structure trimmed in stone and an ornament to the city". The land was purchased and the synagogue was built for a total cost of $13,000. It was located on the north side of West Eighth Street, between Myrtle Street and Sassafras Street. (Note: According to an Erie street map dated circa 2003, this entire block is part of Gannon University, but a personal visit to the site revealed privately owned apartment buildings. A building at 230-232 West 8th Street is the only likely candidate for the old synagogue among extant buildings on the block.) At the time Samuel Bates published his history, the membership of Anshe Hesed was 35.

The Tenth Street location was dedicated on 27 June 1930.

The Temple moved to its current location at 5401 Old Zuck Road in 2018.

== Rabbis and prominent members of the congregation ==
Fourteen rabbis have served Anshe Hesed. Rabbi Weil served the congregation for about a year. Rabbi M. Wertzel, also known as M Wurzel, then served the congregation twice for a total of approximately fourteen years. He was followed by Rabbis Fuld, Dr. Flengel, Levi, and Stemple.

Rabbi Max C. Currick served the longest at 47 years (1901 to 1948). The most recent to serve have been Rabbis Randall M. Falk, Leonard Zion, Bernard Perlmuter, Lewis Littman, Bradley N. Bleefeld, Samuel Weinstein, Michael L. Feshbach, John L. Bush, and, from 2015 to 2018, Emily Ilana Losben-Ostrov. Emily Ilana Losben-Ostrov was Anshe Hesed's first female rabbi and the first female rabbi in the Erie area. The current rabbi is Robert Morais.

Mr. B. Baker was the first president of the congregation. As one of the congregation's oldest members, Mr. Baker laid the cornerstone of the first synagogue in 1882.

== Cemetery ==
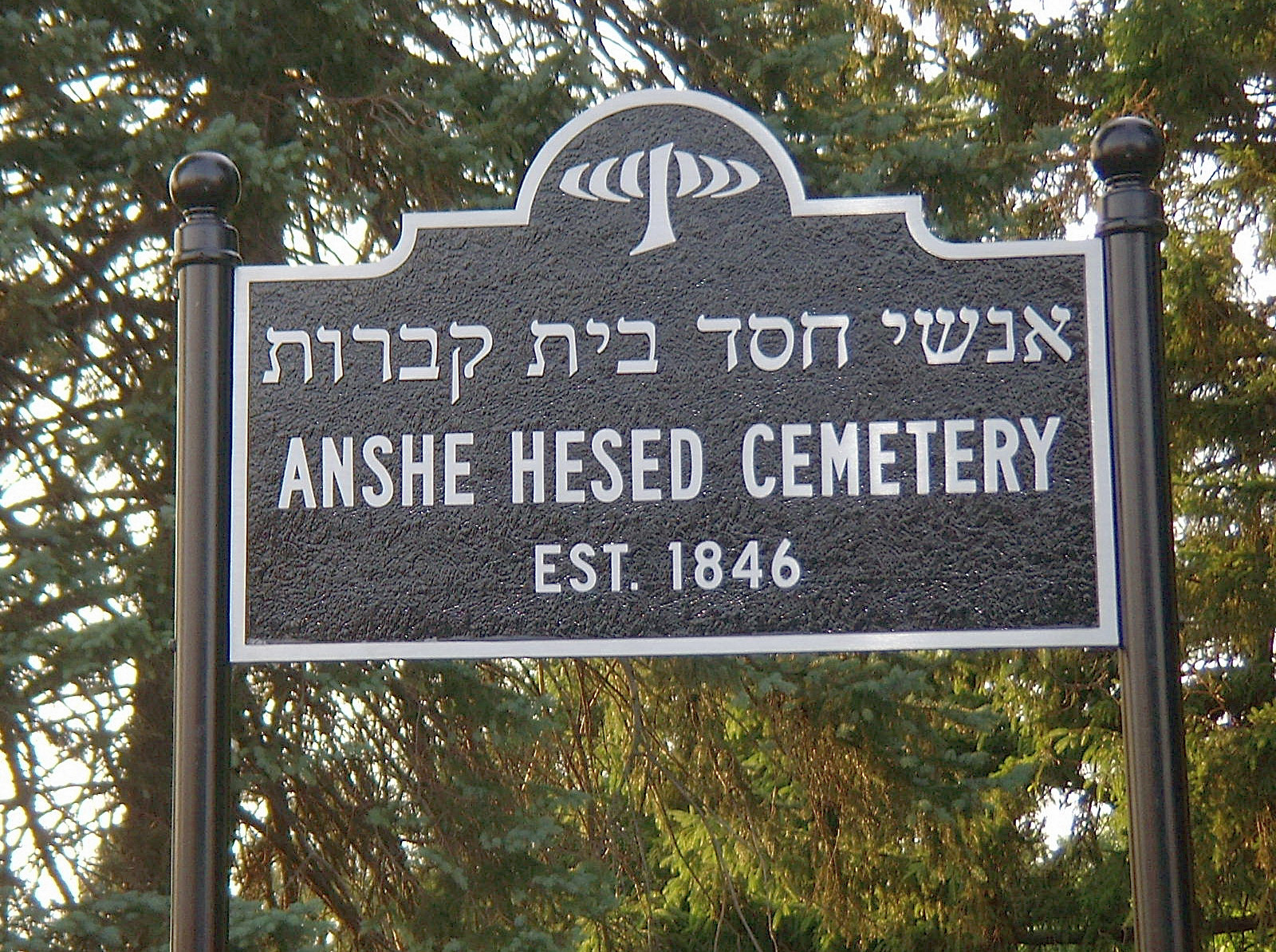
Temple Anshe Hesed's cemetery on West 26th Street

Erie's earliest Jewish cemetery, which is now called the Anshe Hesed Cemetery, was founded in 1846. It is located a block west of Erie Cemetery on West 26th Street between Cherry Street and Poplar Street.
