= Isidro Salusky =

American nephrologist

Isidro B. Salusky is an Argentine-American nephrologist.

== Biography ==
Salusky obtained his M.D. degree from the National University of Buenos Aires in Argentina and completed a residency in Buenos Aires. He completed a fellowship in pediatric nephrology in Paris, as well as research and clinical fellowships in Los Angeles. Salusky became a Distinguished Professor of Pediatrics and Chief, Pediatric Nephrology at the Ronald Reagan UCLA Medical Center.

According to the American Academy of Pediatrics, Salusky's research over his career "established the foundation for our understanding of bone and mineral metabolism in children with chronic kidney disease."

As of 2017, he was an editor of the American Journal of Kidney Diseases and several other medical journals.
