= Isidro Fabré =

Cuban baseball player (born 1895)

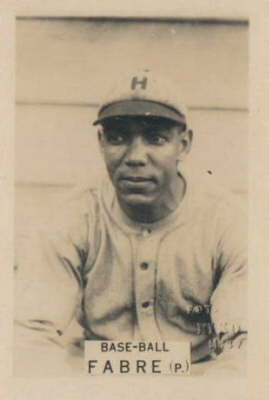
- Outfielder / Pitcher
- Born: May 15, 1895; Havana, Cuba
- Died: Unknown
- Batted: Right Threw: Right

Negro leagues debut
- 1918, for the Cuban Stars (East)

Last Negro leagues appearance
- 1939, for the New York Cubans

Negro leagues (Note: On December 16, 2020, Major League Baseball declared the Negro leagues, from the span of 1920–1948, to be a "Major League". Fabré's statistics reflect his time in the Negro leagues from 1923–1929 and 1939, the final year of his career.) statistics
- Batting average: .252
- Home runs: 10
- Runs batted in: 102
- Win–loss record: 14–27
- Earned run average: 4.72
- Strikeouts: 125
- Stats at Baseball Reference

Teams
- Cuban Stars (East) (1918, 1920–1929); Stars of Cuba (1931); Cuban Stars (East) (1932–1935, 1937); New York Cubans (1939)

Member of the Cuban

Baseball Hall of Fame
- Induction: 1956

Isidro Fabré Fontrodona (May 15, 1895 - death date unknown) was a Cuban professional baseball outfielder and pitcher in the Negro leagues. He played from 1918 to 1939, mostly with the Cuban Stars (East). Fabré was elected to the Cuban Baseball Hall of Fame in 1956.
