= Isidro Pedraza Chávez =

Mexican politician (1959–2020)

- Born: 15 May 1959; Jacala de Ledezma, Hidalgo, Mexico
- Died: 10 November 2020 (aged 61)
- Occupation: Senator
- Political party: PRD

Isidro Pedraza Chávez (15 May 1959 – 10 November 2020) was a Mexican politician affiliated with the PRD.

== Biography ==
He served as Senator of the LXII Legislature of the Mexican Congress representing Hidalgo. He also served as Deputy during the LX Legislature.

Pedraza Chávez died of COVID-19 in Pachuca, Hidalgo, on 10 November 2020, at the age of 61.
