= 2010 Liga de Voleibol Superior Femenino =

The 2010 Liga de Voleibol Superior Femenino was the 42nd official season of Liga de Voleibol Superior Femenino (English: Female Superior Volleyball League). The 2010 season was dedicated to Miguel Ángel Nazario Gotay.

== Competing Teams ==
Team	City	Venue	Head Coach
Criollas de Caguas	Caguas	Coliseo Héctor Solá Bezares	(Puerto Rico) Rubén Nieves
Gigantes de Carolina	Carolina	Guillermo Angulo Coliseum	(Puerto Rico) Arcángel Ruiz
Indias de Mayagüez	Cabo Rojo	Coliseo Rebekah Colberg Cabrera	(Puerto Rico) Humberto Rodríguez
Lancheras de Cataño	Cataño	Cancha Cosme Beitía Sálamo	(Puerto Rico) Milton Crespo
Leonas de Ponce	Ponce	Coliseo Juan Pachín Vicéns	(Puerto Rico) Rafael Olazagasti
Llaneras de Toa Baja	Toa Baja	Coliseo Antonio R. Barceló	(Puerto Rico) Juan Carlos Núñez
Mets de Guaynabo	Guaynabo	Coliseo Mario Morales	(Puerto Rico) Carlos Rodríguez
Pinkin de Corozal	Corozal	Coliseo Carmen Zoraida Figueroa	(Puerto Rico) Luis E. Ruiz
Vaqueras de Bayamón	Bayamón	Coliseo Rubén Rodríguez	(Puerto Rico) Yarelis Rodríguez
Valencianas de Juncos	Juncos	Coliseo Rafael G. Amalbert	(Puerto Rico) David Alemán

== Regular season ==
Pos	Team	G	W	L	Ratio	SW	SL	Ratio	PW	PL	Ratio
1	Llaneras de Toa Baja	22	21	1	0.9545	64	21	3.048	1992	1730	1.151
2	Lancheras de Cataño	22	16	6	0.7273	60	29	2.069	2061	1666	1.237
3	Indias de Mayagüez	22	14	8	0.6364	51	44	1.159	2066	2034	1.016
4	Criollas de Caguas	22	10	12	0.4545	46	45	1.022	2011	2027	0.992
5	Pinkin de Corozal	22	10	12	0.4545	40	43	0.930	1847	1836	1.006
6	Gigantes de Carolina	22	9	13	0.4091	39	48	0.813	1915	1930	0.992
7	Vaqueras de Bayamón	22	9	13	0.4091	35	45	0.778	1598	1815	0.880
8	Valencianas de Juncos	22	9	13	0.4091	34	50	0.680	1792	1905	0.941
9	Leonas de Ponce	22	8	14	0.4091	37	49	0.755	1833	1870	0.980
10	Mets de Guaynabo	22	4	18	0.1818	27	59	0.458	1677	1979	0.847

== Regular season awards ==
Athletes awarded at "Values of the Year Gala", April 24, 2010 in Isla Verde, Puerto Rico.

=== Individual awards ===
==== Voting Awards ====
- Most valuable player
  - Oneida González Lancheras de Cataño
- Best setter
  - Courtney Thompson Lancheras de Cataño
- More Progress Player
  - Stephanie Enright Criollas de Caguas
- Comeback Player of the Year
  - Shannon Torregrosa Lancheras de Cataño
- Rookie of the Year
  - Bianca Rivera Vaqueras de Bayamón
- Coach Of the Year
  - Milton Crespo Lancheras de Cataño
- Chairman Of the Year
  - William López Lancheras de Cataño
- Referee of the Year
  - Juan Carlos Juarbe

==== Statistics Awards ====
- Best receiver
  - Xaimara Colón Gigantes de Carolina
- Best digger
  - Xaimara Colón Gigantes de Carolina
- Best libero
  - Xaimara Colón Gigantes de Carolina
- Best scorer
  - Oneida González Lancheras de Cataño
- Best spiker
  - Oneida González Lancheras de Cataño
- Best blocker
  - Jessica Jones Gigantes de Carolina
- Best server
  - Nellie Spicer Leonas de Ponce
- Best setter
  - Karla Echenique Gigantes de Carolina

=== 2010 All-Stars Team ===
Player	Position	Club
(Puerto Rico) Courtney Thompson	Setter	Lancheras de Cataño
(Canada) Stacey Gordon	Wing spiker	Llaneras de Toa Baja
(United States) Sonja Newcombe	Wing spiker	Leonas de Ponce
(United States) Jessica Jones	Middle blocker	Gigantes de Carolina
(Puerto Rico) Jessica Candelario	Middle blocker	Pinkin de Corozal
(Venezuela) Oneida González	Opposite	Lancheras de Cataño
(Puerto Rico) Xaimara Colón	Libero	Gigantes de Carolina

=== 2010 Offensive Team ===
Player	Club
(Puerto Rico) Sarai Álvarez	Indias de Mayagüez
(Venezuela) Oneida González	Lancheras de Cataño
(Canada) Stacey Gordon	Llaneras de Toa Baja
(United States) Sonja Newcombe	Leonas de Ponce
(United States) Kelly Wing	Valencianas de Juncos
(Venezuela) Graciela Márquez	Llaneras de Toa Baja

== All Star Game ==
=== Results ===
- Sunday March 21, 2010. Coliseum Héctor Solá Bezares, Caguas, Puerto Rico

Importadas (Foreigners)	3–1	Nativas (Natives)	25–23, 22–25, 25–21, 25–15

=== Teams ===
==== Nativas (Natives) ====
Head coach: (Puerto Rico) Juan Carlos Núñez

Player	Club
(Puerto Rico) Vilmarie Mojica	Pinkin de Corozal
(Puerto Rico) Yeimily Mojica	Llaneras de Toa Baja
(Puerto Rico) Stephanie Enright	Criollas de Caguas
(Puerto Rico) Tatiana Encarnación	Gigantes de Carolina
(Venezuela) Graciela Márquez	Llaneras de Toa Baja
(Puerto Rico) Ania Ruíz	Lancheras de Cataño
(Puerto Rico) Saraí Álvarez	Indias de Mayagüez
(Venezuela) Oneida González	Lancheras de Cataño
(Puerto Rico) Alexandra Oquendo	Criollas de Caguas
(Puerto Rico) Shannon Torregrosa	Lancheras de Cataño
(Puerto Rico) Amanda Vásquez	Indias de Mayagüez
(Puerto Rico) Bianca Rivera	Vaqueras de Bayamón
(Puerto Rico) Xaimara Colón	Gigantes de Carolina

==== Importadas (Foreigners) ====
Head coach: (Puerto Rico) Humberto Rodríguez

Player	Club
(United States) Erin Moore	Vaqueras de Bayamón
(United States) Shonda Cole	Criollas de Caguas
(United States) Kristee Porter	Pinkin de Corozal
(United States) Jessica Jones	Gigantes de Carolina
(Dominican Republic) Karla Echenique	Gigantes de Carolina
(United States) Courtney Thompson	Lancheras de Cataño
(United States) Airial Salvo	Lancheras de Cataño
(Cuba) Dulce Téllez	Mets de Guaynabo
(United States) Katie Wilkins	Mets de Guaynabo
(United States) Kelly Wing	Valencianas de Juncos
(Canada) Tiffany Dodds	Indias de Mayagüez
(United States) Nellie Spicer	Leonas de Ponce
(United States) Sonja Newcombe	Leonas de Ponce
(Canada) Stacey Gordon	Llaneras de Toa Baja
(United States) Jennifer Joines	Llaneras de Toa Baja

=== All-Star Game Most Valuable Player ===
  - (United States) Courtney Thompson Lancheras de Cataño

== Quarter finals ==
=== Group A ===
Pos	Team	G	W	L	Ratio	SW	SL	Ratio	PW	PL	Ratio
1	Pinkin de Corozal	6	5	1	0.833	15	7	2.143	500	444	1.126
2	Llaneras de Toa Baja	6	4	2	0.667	13	9	1.444	491	439	1.118
3	Criollas de Caguas	6	2	4	0.333	10	12	0.833	469	490	0.957
4	Valencianas de Juncos	6	1	5	0.167	5	15	0.333	393	480	0.819

=== Group B ===
Pos	Team	G	W	L	Ratio	SW	SL	Ratio	PW	PL	Ratio
1	Lancheras de Cataño	6	5	1	0.833	15	5	3.000	468	390	1.200
2	Vaqueras de Bayamón	6	3	3	0.500	13	11	1.182	566	510	1.110
3	Indias de Mayagüez	6	2	4	0.333	10	12	0.833	453	506	0.895
4	Gigantes de Carolina	6	2	4	0.333	6	16	0.375	455	536	0.849

== Semifinals ==
=== Group A ===
Pos	Team	G	W	L	Ratio	SW	SL	Ratio	PW	PL	Ratio
1	Llaneras de Toa Baja	5	4	1	4.000	12	5	2.400	395	366	1.079
2	Lancheras de Cataño	5	1	4	0.250	5	12	0.417	366	395	0.927

=== Group B ===
Pos	Team	G	W	L	Ratio	SW	SL	Ratio	PW	PL	Ratio
1	Pinkin de Corozal	4	4	0	MAX	12	5	2.400	385	330	1.167
2	Vaqueras de Bayamón	4	0	4	0.000	5	12	0.417	330	385	0.857

== Final ==
=== Best of 7 Series ===
The 2010 Final series were played at the Roberto Clemente Coliseum, San Juan, Puerto Rico.

Pos	Team	G	W	L	Ratio	SW	SL	Ratio	PW	PL	Ratio
1	Pinkin de Corozal	4	4	0	MAX	12	4	3.000	379	342	1.108
2	Llaneras de Toa Baja	4	0	4	0.000	4	12	0.333	342	379	0.902

==== Game 1 ====
May 6, 2010

	Score		Set 1	Set 2	Set 3	Set 4	Set 5
Pinkin de Corozal	PUR	3–2	Llaneras de Toa Baja	PUR	19–25	22–25	25–21

==== Game 2 ====
May 8, 2010

	Score		Set 1	Set 2	Set 3	Set 4	Set 5
Llaneras de Toa Baja	PUR	1–3	Pinkin de Corozal	PUR	25–18	17–25	17–25

==== Game 3 ====
May 10, 2010

	Score		Set 1	Set 2	Set 3	Set 4	Set 5
Pinkin de Corozal	PUR	3–0	Llaneras de Toa Baja	PUR	27–25	25–20	25–20

==== Game 4 ====
May 12, 2010

	Score		Set 1	Set 2	Set 3	Set 4	Set 5
Llaneras de Toa Baja	PUR	1–3	Pinkin de Corozal	PUR	21–25	27–29	25–23

=== Awards ===
- Final Series Most Valuable Player
  - Destinee Hooker Pinkin de Corozal

2010 Liga de Voleibol Superior Femenino
Pinkin de Corozal
17th Title
