= 2009 Liga de Voleibol Superior Femenino =

The 2009 Liga de Voleibol Superior Femenino was the 41st official season of Liga de Voleibol Superior Femenino (English: Female Superior Volleyball League). The 2009 season was dedicated to Rosario Vega de Raíces.

== Competing Teams ==
Team	City	Venue	Head Coach
Caribes de San Sebastián	San Sebastián	Coliseo Luis Aymat Cardona	(Puerto Rico) Milton Crespo
Criollas de Caguas	Caguas	Coliseo Héctor Solá Bezares	(Puerto Rico) Luis García
Gigantes de Carolina	Carolina	Guillermo Angulo Coliseum	(Puerto Rico) Javier Gaspar
Indias de Mayagüez	Cabo Rojo	Coliseo Rebekah Colberg Cabrera	(Puerto Rico) Humberto Rodríguez
Leonas de Ponce	Ponce	Coliseo Juan Pachín Vicéns	(Puerto Rico) Héctor Rentas
Llaneras de Toa Baja	Toa Baja	Coliseo Antonio R. Barceló	(Puerto Rico) Juan Carlos Núñez
Mets de Guaynabo	Guaynabo	Coliseo Mario Morales	(Cuba) / (Dominican Republic) Jorge Pérez Vento
Pinkin de Corozal	Corozal	Coliseo Carmen Zoraida Figueroa	(Puerto Rico) Luis E. Ruiz
Vaqueras de Bayamón	Bayamón	Coliseo Rubén Rodríguez	(Puerto Rico) Xiomara Molero
Valencianas de Juncos	Juncos	Coliseo Rafael G. Amalbert	(Puerto Rico) David Alemán

== Regular season ==
Pos	Team	G	W	L	Ratio	SW	SL	Ratio	PW	PL	Ratio
1	Llaneras de Toa Baja	22	19	3	0.864	60	25	2.400	1930	1738	1.110
2	Pinkin de Corozal	22	19	3	0.864	58	23	2.522	1940	1619	1.198
3	Gigantes de Carolina	22	14	8	0.636	54	38	1.421	2004	1902	1.054
4	Valencianas de Juncos	22	12	10	0.545	42	43	0.977	1855	1853	1.001
5	Criollas de Caguas	22	11	11	0.500	42	49	0.857	1946	1941	1.003
6	Indias de Mayagüez	22	10	12	0.455	43	45	0.956	1851	1914	0.967
7	Vaqueras de Bayamón	22	10	12	0.455	42	40	1.050	1842	1800	1.023
8	Mets de Guaynabo	22	7	15	0.318	34	50	0.680	1799	1916	0.939
9	Caribes de San Sebastián	22	7	15	0.318	42	52	0.808	1965	2036	0.965
10	Leonas de Ponce	22	1	21	0.045	12	64	0.188	1441	1818	0.793

== Regular season awards ==
=== Individual awards ===
- Most valuable player
  - Jordan Larson Vaqueras de Bayamón
- Best scorer
  - Jordan Larson Vaqueras de Bayamón
- Best Scorer (Average)
  - Jordan Larson Vaqueras de Bayamón
- Best spiker
  - Jordan Larson Vaqueras de Bayamón
- Best Spiker (Average)
  - Jordan Larson Vaqueras de Bayamón
- Best blocker
  - Jessica Jones Caribes de San Sebastián
- Best Blocker (Average)
  - Jessica Jones Caribes de San Sebastián
- Best server
  - Yasary Castrodad Gigantes de Carolina
- Best server
  - Shonda Cole Caribes de San Sebastián
- Best Server (Average)
  - Yasary Castrodad Gigantes de Carolina
- Best digger
  - Deborah Seilhamer Indias de Mayagüez
- Best Digger (Average)
  - Deborah Seilhamer Indias de Mayagüez
- Best setter
  - Vilmarie Mojica Pinkin de Corozal
- Best Setter (Average)
  - Vilmarie Mojica Pinkin de Corozal
- Best receiver
  - Xaimara Colón Gigantes de Carolina
- Best Receiver (Average)
  - Shara Venegas Llaneras de Toa Baja
- Best libero
  - Deborah Seilhamer Indias de Mayagüez
- Comeback Player of the Year
  - Doris Torresola Valencianas de Juncos
- More Progress Player
  - Yeimily Mojica Llaneras de Toa Baja
- Rookie of the Year
  - Lorraine Avilés Leonas de Ponce
- Coach Of the Year
  - Juan Carlos Núñez Llaneras de Toa Baja
- Chairman Of the Year
  - Peter Rivera Vaqueras de Bayamón
- Chairman Of the Year
  - Martín Rosado Llaneras de Toa Baja
- Referee of the Year
  - Héctor Ortiz

=== 2009 All-Stars Team ===
Votes	Player	Position	Club
31	(Puerto Rico) Vilmarie Mojica	Setter	Pinkin de Corozal
29	(United States) Jordan Larson	Wing spiker	Vaqueras de Bayamón
17	(United States) Kristee Porter	Wing spiker	Pinkin de Corozal
33	(United States) Jessica Jones	Middle blocker	Caribes de San Sebastián
19	(Puerto Rico) Yasary Castrodad	Middle blocker	Gigantes de Carolina
15	(United States) Shonda Cole	Opposite	Caribes de San Sebastián
27	(Puerto Rico) Deborah Seilhamer	Libero	Indias de Mayagüez

=== 2009 Offensive Team ===
Votes	Player	Club
31	(United States) Jordan Larson	Vaqueras de Bayamón
29	(Dominican Republic) Lisvel Elisa Eve	Criollas de Caguas
29	(United States) Shonda Cole	Caribes de San Sebastián
26	(United States) Kristee Porter	Pinkin de Corozal
24	(Puerto Rico) Sarai Álvarez	Indias de Mayagüez
14	(United States) Casandra Bussie	Llaneras de Toa Baja

== All Star Game ==
=== Results ===
- Sunday March 15, 2009

Importadas (Foreigners)	3-1	Nativas (Natives)	25-22, 16-25, 25-22, 25-18

=== Teams ===
==== Nativas (Natives) ====
Head coach: (Puerto Rico) Juan Carlos Núñez

Player	Club
(Puerto Rico) Vilmarie Mojica	Pinkin de Corozal
(Puerto Rico) Yeimily Mojica	Llaneras de Toa Baja
(Venezuela) Graciela Márquez	Llaneras de Toa Baja
(Puerto Rico) Dariam Acevedo	Mets de Guaynabo
(Puerto Rico) Yarleen Santiago	Gigantes de Carolina
(Puerto Rico) Leichelie Guzmán	Leonas de Ponce
(Puerto Rico) Sheila Ocasio	Valencianas de Juncos
(Puerto Rico) Yasary Castrodad	Gigantes de Carolina
(Puerto Rico) Amanda Vázquez	Indias de Mayagüez
(Puerto Rico) Saraí Álvarez	Indias de Mayagüez
(Puerto Rico) Eva Cruz	Valencianas de Juncos
(Puerto Rico) Deborah Seilhamer	Indias de Mayagüez
(Puerto Rico) Joyce Rivera	Criollas de Caguas
(Puerto Rico) Jessica Candelario	Pinkin de Corozal
(Puerto Rico) Lorraine Avilés	Leonas de Ponce

==== Importadas (Foreigners) ====
Head coach: (Puerto Rico) Luis Enrique “Kike” Ruiz

Player	Club
(United States) Rachel Hartmann	Gigantes de Carolina
(Puerto Rico) Greichaly Cepero	Indias de Mayagüez
(United States) Jordan Larson	Vaqueras de Bayamón
(Dominican Republic) Lisvel Elisa Eve	Criollas de Caguas
(United States) Kyle Atherstone	Gigantes de Carolina
(United States) Kristee Porter	Pinkin de Corozal
(United States) Erin Moore	Pinkin de Corozal
(United States) Patrice Arrington	Mets de Guaynabo
(United States) Victoria Brown	Valencianas de Juncos
(United States) Jessica Vander Kooi	Indias de Mayagüez
(United States) Belita Salters	Leonas de Ponce
(United States) Shonda Cole	Caribes de San Sebastián
(United States) Jessica Jones	Caribes de San Sebastián
(United States) Cassandra Busse	Llaneras de Toa Baja
(United States) Alexis Crimes	Llaneras de Toa Baja

=== All-Star Game Most Valuable Player ===
  - (United States) Jordan Larson Vaqueras de Bayamón

== Quarter finals ==
=== Group A ===
Pos	Team	G	W	L	Ratio	SW	SL	Ratio	PW	PL	Ratio
1	Llaneras de Toa Baja	6	5	1	0.833	15	6	2.500	488	409	1.193
2	Valencianas de Juncos	6	3	3	0.500	12	13	0.923	526	541	0.972
3	Criollas de Caguas	6	2	4	0.333	11	14	0.786	516	531	0.972
4	Mets de Guaynabo	6	2	4	0.333	8	13	0.615	427	476	0.897

=== Group B ===
Pos	Team	G	W	L	Ratio	SW	SL	Ratio	PW	PL	Ratio
1	Pinkin de Corozal	6	5	1	0.833	15	7	2.143	502	459	1.094
2	Gigantes de Carolina	6	3	3	0.500	11	12	0.917	488	498	0.980
3	Indias de Mayagüez	6	2	4	0.333	11	14	0.786	508	546	0.930
4	Vaqueras de Bayamón	6	2	4	0.333	10	14	0.714	508	503	1.010

== Semifinals ==
=== Group A ===
Pos	Team	G	W	L	Ratio	SW	SL	Ratio	PW	PL	Ratio
1	Llaneras de Toa Baja	5	4	1	4.000	14	5	2.800	437	371	1.178
2	Gigantes de Carolina	5	1	4	0.250	5	14	0.357	371	437	0.849

=== Group B ===
Pos	Team	G	W	L	Ratio	SW	SL	Ratio	PW	PL	Ratio
1	Pinkin de Corozal	7	4	3	0.571	15	13	1.154	612	597	1.025
2	Valencianas de Juncos	7	3	4	0.429	13	15	0.867	597	612	0.975

== Final ==
=== Best of 7 Series ===
Pos	Team	G	W	L	Ratio	SW	SL	Ratio	PW	PL	Ratio
1	Llaneras de Toa Baja	5	4	1	4.000	14	7	2.000	454	399	1.138
2	Pinkin de Corozal	5	1	4	0.250	7	14	0.500	399	454	0.879

=== Awards ===
- Final Series Most Valuable Player
  - Graciela Márquez Llaneras de Toa Baja

2009 Liga de Voleibol Superior Femenino
Llaneras de Toa Baja
Second Title
