= Llaneras de Toa Baja squads =

This article shows past squads from the Puerto Rican professional volleyball team Llaneras de Toa Baja from the Liga de Voleibol Superior Femenino.

== 2010 ==
Final Standing: First Runner-Up As of March 2010

- Head Coach: (Puerto Rico) Juan Carlos Núñez
- Assistant coach: (Puerto Rico) Gabriel Rodríguez

| Number | Player | Position |
|---|---|---|
| 1 | (Puerto Rico) Paola Sanchez | Opposite |
| 2 | (Puerto Rico) Shara Venegas | Libero |
| 3 | (Puerto Rico) Yeimily Mojica | Setter |
| 4 | (Puerto Rico) Elena Martínez | Libero |
| 5 | (Puerto Rico) Elimarie Escalante | Setter |
| 6 | (Puerto Rico) Cynthia Díaz | Opposite |
| 7 | (Puerto Rico) Laudevis Marrero | Middle Blocker |
| 9 | (Canada) Stacey Gordon | Wing Spiker |
| 10 | (Venezuela) Graciela Márquez | Wing Spiker |
| 11 | (United States) Cassandra Busse | Opposite |
| 12 | (Puerto Rico) Aracelis Silva | Wing Spiker |
| 13 | (United States) Jennifer Joines | Middle Blocker |
| 16 | (Venezuela) Tibisay Rodríguez | Setter |
| 18 | (Puerto Rico) Loany Torres | Middle Blocker |

== 2009 ==
- Awards: League Championship.
- Head Coach: (Puerto Rico) Juan Carlos Núñez
- Assistant coach: (Puerto Rico) Julio Ruvira

| Number | Player | Position |
|---|---|---|
| 1 | (United States) Alexis Crimes | Wing Spiker |
| 2 | (Puerto Rico) Shara Venegas | Libero |
| 3 | (Puerto Rico) Yeimily Mojica | Setter |
| 4 | (Puerto Rico) Lourdes Isern | Libero |
| 5 | (Puerto Rico) Madeline González | Setter |
| 6 | (Puerto Rico) Cynthia Díaz | Middle Blocker |
| 7 | (Puerto Rico) Laudevis Marrero | Middle Blocker |
| 8 | (Puerto Rico) Áurea Cruz | Wing Spiker |
| 9 | (Guyana) Petra Lorenzi | Setter |
| 10 | (Venezuela) Graciela Márquez | Wing Spiker |
| 11 | (United States) Cassandra Busse | Opposite |
| 12 | (Puerto Rico) Lyani Hidalgo | Middle Blocker |
| 17 | (Puerto Rico) Sharon Bauldrick | Opposite |
| 18 | (United States) Sarah Muñoz | Wing Spiker |

=== Release or Transfer ===
| Number | Player | Position |
|---|---|---|
| 1 | (United States) Angela Pressey | Wing Spiker |

== 2008 ==
- Head Coach: (Puerto Rico) Luis E. Ruiz
- Assistant coach: (Puerto Rico) Yarelis Rodríguez

| Number | Player | Position |
|---|---|---|
| 1 | (Puerto Rico) Lisandra Cruz | Wing Spiker |
| 3 | (Puerto Rico) Yeimily Mojica | Wing Spiker |
| 5 | (Venezuela) María José Pérez | Wing Spiker |
| 6 | (Puerto Rico) Cynthia Díaz | Opposite |
| 7 | (Puerto Rico) Claudia Rodríguez | Middle Blocker |
| 9 | (Puerto Rico) Ednali Serralta | Wing Spiker |
| 10 | (Venezuela) Graciela Márquez | Wing Spiker |
| 12 | (United States) Kelly Wing | Opposite |
| 14 | (United States) Brandy McGee | Middle Blocker |
| 15 | (Puerto Rico) Natalia Rivera | Wing Spiker |
| 16 | (Puerto Rico) Jessenia Resto | Wing Spiker |
| 17 | (Puerto Rico) Laudevis Marrero | Middle Blocker |

=== Release or Transfer ===
| Number | Player | Position |
|---|---|---|
| 2 | (United States) Cristal Hudson | Wing Spiker |
| 2 | (United States) Cassy Salyer | Wing Spiker |
| 11 | (Puerto Rico) Melody Coste | Opposite |

== 2007 ==
- Head Coach: (Puerto Rico) David Alemán
- Assistant coach: (Puerto Rico) Luis Benítez
- Assistant coach: (Puerto Rico) Juan Zayas

| Number | Player | Position |
|---|---|---|
| 1 | (Puerto Rico) Lisandra Cruz | Libero |
| 2 | (Puerto Rico) Shirley Pérez | Libero |
| 3 | (Puerto Rico) Yeimily Mojica | Wing Spiker |
| 4 | (Puerto Rico) Lymaris González | Wing Spiker |
| 5 | (Puerto Rico) Sacha Valdez | Wing Spiker |
| 6 | (Puerto Rico) Cynthia Díaz | Opposite |
| 7 | (Puerto Rico) Laudevis Marrero | Middle Blocker |
| 9 | (Venezuela) Oneida González | Wing Spiker |
| 10 | (Venezuela) Graciela Márquez | Wing Spiker |
| 11 | (Puerto Rico) Melody Coste | Opposite |
| 12 | (Puerto Rico) Mariví Morales | Middle Blocker |
| 13 | (Mexico) Laura Daniela Lloreda | Wing Spiker |
| 14 | (Puerto Rico) Macarena Rotger | Middle Blocker |
| 16 | (Puerto Rico) Jessenia Resto | Wing Spiker |
