= Pinkin de Corozal squads =

This article shows past squads from the Puerto Rican professional volleyball team Pinkin de Corozal from the Liga de Voleibol Superior Femenino.

== 2011 ==
As of February 2011

- Position: Lost in quarterfinals
- Head Coach: (Puerto Rico) Luis E. Ruiz
- Assistant coach: (Cuba) Jorge Pérez Vento

Number	Player	Position
1	(Puerto Rico) Marisel Rabel	Setter
2	(Puerto Rico) Vanessa Vélez	Wing Spiker
3	(Puerto Rico) Pamela Cartagena	Libero
5	(Puerto Rico) Ivonessa García	Middle Blocker
6	(Puerto Rico) Wendy Colón	Setter
9	(Puerto Rico) Jessica Candelario	Middle Blocker
10	(Puerto Rico) Darangelys Yantín	Wing Spiker
11	(Puerto Rico) Nomaris Vélez	Libero
12	(Puerto Rico) Gelimar Rodríguez	Wing Spiker
13	(Puerto Rico) Yamileska Yantín	Opposite
14	(United States) Shonda Cole	Opposite
15	(United States) Crystal Matich	Setter
16	(Puerto Rico) Génesis Collazo	Opposite
17	(Puerto Rico) Monica Ruiz	Libero
18	(Dominican Republic) Milagros Cabral	Wing Spiker

== 2010 ==
- Awards: League Championship
- Head Coach: (Puerto Rico) Luis E. Ruiz
- Assistant coach: (Cuba) Jorge Pérez Vento

Number	Player	Position
1	(United States) Kristee Porter	Wing Spiker
2	(Puerto Rico) Karla Laviera	Libero
3	(Puerto Rico) Pamela Cartagena	Libero
4	(Puerto Rico) Vilmarie Mojica	Setter
5	(Puerto Rico) Ivonessa García	Middle Blocker
6	(Puerto Rico) Wendy Colón	Setter
9	(Puerto Rico) Jessica Candelario	Middle Blocker
10	(Puerto Rico) Darangelys Yantín	Wing Spiker
11	(Puerto Rico) Vanessa Vélez	Wing Spiker
12	(Puerto Rico) Gelimar Rodríguez	Wing Spiker
13	(Puerto Rico) Winna Pellot	Libero
14	(Puerto Rico) Yamileska Yantín	Opposite
15	(United States) Shonda Cole	Opposite
16	(Puerto Rico) Génesis Collazo	Wing Spiker
18	(United States) Destinee Hooker	Wing Spiker

=== Release or Transfer ===
Number	Player	Position
1	(United States) Christal Morrison	Wing Spiker
11	(United States) Kaitlin Sather	Wing Spiker
15	(United States) Heather Hughes	Wing Spiker
15	(Puerto Rico) Daniela Bertrán	Wing Spiker

== 2009 ==
- Awards: League Runner-Up.
- Head Coach: (Puerto Rico) Luis E. Ruiz
- Assistant coach: (Puerto Rico) Yarelis Rodríguez

Number	Player	Position
1	(United States) Kristee Porter	Wing Spiker
2	(Puerto Rico) Guadalupe Bou	Wing Spiker
3	(Puerto Rico) Suheil Medina	Setter
4	(Puerto Rico) Vilmarie Mojica	Setter
5	(Puerto Rico) Ivonessa García	Middle Blocker
6	(Puerto Rico) Wendy Colón	Setter
9	(Puerto Rico) Jessica Candelario	Middle Blocker
10	(Dominican Republic) Milagros Cabral	Wing Spiker
12	(Puerto Rico) Stephanie Rivera	Opposite
13	(Puerto Rico) Yamileska Yantín	Opposite
14	(Puerto Rico) Rayma Robles	Middle Blocker
17	(Puerto Rico) Grekchy Meléndez	Libero

=== Release or Transfer ===
Number	Player	Position
15	(United States) Erin Moore	Wing Spiker

== 2008 ==
- Awards: League Championship.
- Head Coach: (Puerto Rico) Luis E. Ruiz
- Assistant coach: (Puerto Rico) Yarelis Rodríguez

Number	Player	Position
1	(United States) Kristee Porter	Wing Spiker
2	(Puerto Rico) Guadalupe Bou	Wing Spiker
3	(Puerto Rico) Suheil Medina	Setter
4	(Puerto Rico) Vilmarie Mojica	Setter
5	(Puerto Rico) Yehimily Cabrera	Middle Blocker
9	(Puerto Rico) Jessica Candelario	Middle Blocker
10	(Dominican Republic) Milagros Cabral	Wing Spiker
11	(Puerto Rico) Yoliana Cabrera	Opposite
13	(Puerto Rico) Yamileska Yantín	Opposite
14	(Puerto Rico) Rayma Robles	Middle Blocker
15	(Puerto Rico) Janice Ortiz	Wing Spiker
17	(Puerto Rico) Grekchy Meléndez	Libero

== 2007 ==
- Position: Lost in Semifinals
- Head Coach: (Puerto Rico) Luis E. Ruiz
- Assistant coach: (Puerto Rico) Steven Fenosic

Number	Player	Position
1	(Puerto Rico) Yaribel Rivera	Libero
2	(Puerto Rico) Guadalupe Bou	Wing Spiker
3	(Puerto Rico) Aidamar Guzmán	Setter
4	(Puerto Rico) Vilmarie Mojica	Setter
5	(Puerto Rico) Yarelis Rodríguez	Wing Spiker
6	(Puerto Rico) Tibisay Rodríguez	Middle Blocker
9	(Puerto Rico) Jessica Candelario	Middle Blocker
10	(United States) Meghan Cumpston	Wing Spiker
11	(Puerto Rico) Edna Serralta	Opposite
13	(Puerto Rico) Yamileska Yantín	Opposite
14	(Puerto Rico) Rayma Robles	Middle Blocker
15	(Puerto Rico) Janice Ortiz	Wing Spiker
16	(Puerto Rico) Alexandra Gómez	Wing Spiker
18	(United States) Kim Glass	Wing Spiker
