= Graciela Márquez =

Venezuelan volleyball player

Personal information
- Full name: Graciela Alexandra Márquez
- Nickname: Chela
- Born: 23 March 1978 (age 48); Maracay, Venezuela
- Height: 182 cm (6 ft 0 in)
- Weight: 56 kg (123 lb)
- Education: Interamerican University of Puerto Rico

Volleyball information
- Position: Libero / outside hitter
- Current club: Capitalinas de San Juan
- Number: 10

National team
1992-2009	Venezuela
Honours
Women's volleyball
Representing Venezuela
Central American and Caribbean Games
Bronze medal – third place	1993 Ponce	Team
Bronze medal – third place	1998 Maracaibo	Team

Graciela Alexandra Márquez (born 23 March 1978) is a Venezuelan female volleyball player.

== Personal life ==
Márquez was born Graciela Alexandra Márquez on 23 March 1978 in Maracay, Venezuela. She is known with the nickname Chela. She is married to the former professional volleyball player and coach José Alvarado and they have a son named Joseph Alfredo. She graduated from Interamerican University of Puerto Rico with a master's degree in human resources.

== Career ==
She started playing in the senior national team since 1992, and she won the bronze medal with the Venezuela national team in the 1993 and 1998 Central American and Caribbean Games. She won with the Venezuelan club Indias Guerreras de Miranda the bronze medal in the 1995 South American Club Championship played in Medellin, Colombia.

With the experience of playing professionally in Peru and Brazil and recovered from an arm injury, she led her national team to the qualifier tournament for the 1997 South American Championship.

The Venezuela national team warmed up in the 1997 Link Cup in Colombia winning the gold medal before playing the zonal qualifier with the Colombian team and later finished in fourth place in the 1997 South American Championship held in Peru. She traveled to Buenos Aires, Argentina and played the 1997/98 season with Gimnasia y Esgrima de Buenos Aires, winning the league championship alongside countrymate Daniela Patiño to Boca Juniors. Márquez recalled that it was difficult at the beginning to adapt and she was defined by the head coach as the right GEBA signing choice. Márquez played in the Italian League Serie A2 clubs Cervi Day Medical Castellanza for the 1998/99 and for the 1999/00, with Cooky Store Castellanza.

=== 2001 ===
She played 4x4 beach volleyball with the Italian Teco Minetti Vicenza winning the 2001 Italian Cup partnering Maurizia Borri, Melissa Donà, Mirela Sesti and Elisa Zamponi. She traveled in 2001 to Puerto Rico with a sports scholarship at Interamerican University of Puerto Rico, and she was tried out by the professional clubs Volleygirls de Guayanilla and later attracted the interest of Leonas de Ponce, who were interested in hiring her for the 2002 Puerto Rican season. She won the 2002 Puerto Rico Athletic Games and Sports Festival volleyball championship and Most Valuable Player award. She was signed for the Puerto Rican club Llaneras de Toa Baja for the 2003 season where she, as a college student, found some money for living was voted for the all-star game and after being the tournament second best scorer with 557 points and best defensive player. On 24 January 2003 she scored 33 points and set a league record when she served 10 aces to the Rebeldes de Moca. She was voted with the 2003 season's Most Valuable Player award. She later was awarded 2002-2003 Puerto Rico Inter-university Athletics League volleyball athlete of the year and finished in the fifth place in the 2003 Pan American Games. After that season, she generated a lot of expectation for the 2004 season, but she underwent fluid extraction from her knees and could not play until the postseason playoffs. She had a knee surgery two months before the 2005 season with the team from Toa Baja and she struggled along the season, but her club decided to reserve her for the next season. She won the silver medal at the 2005 Bolivarian Games and the 2005 Puerto Rico Athletic Games and Sports Festival championship with Interamerican University.

=== 2006 ===
During the 2006 season from the Puerto Rican league she was still recovering from her knee, but managed to top the scorer with 515 points, being also chosen among the Offensive Team, Best Spiker and All Star, helping her club to reach the postseason playoffs after winning the sudden death match against Valencianas de Juncos. She joined the national team for the first time since 2003 and played as the team libero during the 2006 Pan-American Cup and the 2006 Central American and Caribbean Games, where her team finished in the fifth place and announced her national team retirement, because she wanted to open the space to let the young players to develop. At the end of the year, she led Interamerican University to win the 2006 Puerto Rico Athletic Games and Sports Festival championship in her last year of eligibility.

=== 2007 ===
She was the first import player to reach the 2,000 points in the Puerto Rican league, achieving this compliment in January 2007, and was praised by the Llaneras de Toa Baja owner Rosario Vega de Raíces as a great person, athlete and partner, additionally defining her as the best reinforcement that has played in the league. Márquez recalled that achievement as result of time and dedication.

Starting the 2008 season she was allowed to play as a local player in the Puerto Rican league. She missed some warm up matches before the beginning of the 2009 season because she underwent fluid extraction from her knees again, was appointed team captain but she led her club to win the Puerto Rican championship and was awarded Finals Most Valuable Player award, and she expressed that winning the title was something she was missing and that she would change her two MVP award for a title. She was among the Offensive team and All-Star in the 2010 season. Márquez reached the 3,000 points scored in the Puerto Rican League on 31 January 2011, but in March, she agreed with Llaneras, her Puerto Rican club, to be substituted by another player because she was experiencing pain in her right knee produced by chronic arthritis. She then served as assistant coach for the rest of the season and the 2012 season that she could not play because of her pregnancy.

During the 2013 season of the Puerto Rican League, she played with Gigantes de Carolina and later was transferred to Lancheras de Cataño. In the first season of the Venezuelan League, Márquez won the 2013 Championship and the Most Valuable player award.

Márquez played as libero for Orientales de Humacao in the 2014 season, helping them to reach the post season playoffs and was selected to play the All-Star game in the Puerto Rican league. She also won the Venezuelan league championship with Aragua and the Most Valuable Player for the 2014 season. As the reigning Venezuelan Champion, she played the 2015 South American Club Championship with Aragua where they finished in the sixth place after losing 2-3 the final match to the Chilean Boston College. She came back to Puerto Rico and acted as head coach of the junior team Colegio Capitán Correa de Arecibo in the Puerto Rican national schools tournaments. For the 2016 Puerto Rican season, she played for Capitalinas de San Juan and won the Comeback of the Year award. She finished in the fourth place among the liberos in the 2017 Puerto Rican league and with 3,637 points, ranked fifth in the League's lifetime records.

== Clubs ==
- (Venezuela) Indias Guerreras de Miranda (1995)
- (Argentina) Gimnasia y Esgrima de Buenos Aires (1997-1998)
- (Italy) Cervi Day Medical Castellanza (1998–1999)
- (Italy) Cooky Store Castellanza (1999–2000)
- (Puerto Rico) Llaneras de Toa Baja (2003–2011)
- (Puerto Rico) Gigantes de Carolina (2013)
- (Puerto Rico) Lancheras de Cataño (2013)
- (Venezuela) Aragua Voleibol Club (2013)
- (Puerto Rico) Orientales de Humacao (2014)
- (Venezuela) Aragua Voleibol Club (2014-2015)
- (Puerto Rico) Capitalinas de San Juan (2016-2017)

== Awards ==
=== Individuals ===
- 2003 Puerto Rican League "Most Valuable Player"
- 2003 Puerto Rican League "All-Star"
- 2006 Puerto Rican League "Most Valuable Player"
- 2006 Puerto Rican League "Best Scorer"
- 2006 Puerto Rican League "Best Spiker"
- 2006 Puerto Rican League "All-Star"
- 2009 Puerto Rican League "Finals Most Valuable Player"
- 2009 Puerto Rican League "All-Star"
- 2010 Puerto Rican League "All-Star"
- 2013 Venezuelan League "Most Valuable Player"
- 2014 Puerto Rican League "All-Star"
- 2014 Venezuelan League "Most Valuable Player"
- 2016 Puerto Rican League "Comeback Player of the Year"

=== Clubs ===
- 1995 South American Club Championship – Bronze medal, with Indias Guerreras de Miranda
- 1997-98 Argentinian League– Champion, with Gimnasia y Esgrima de Buenos Aires
- 2004 Puerto Rican League – Bronze medal, with Llaneras de Toa Baja
- 2009 Puerto Rican League – Champion, with Llaneras de Toa Baja
- 2010 Puerto Rican League – Runner-Up, with Llaneras de Toa Baja
- 2013 Venezuelan League – Champion, with Aragua Voleibol Club
- 2014 Venezuelan League – Champion, with Aragua Voleibol Club
- 2016 Puerto Rican League – Runner-Up, with Capitalinas de San Juan
