= Nicole Fawcett =

American volleyball player

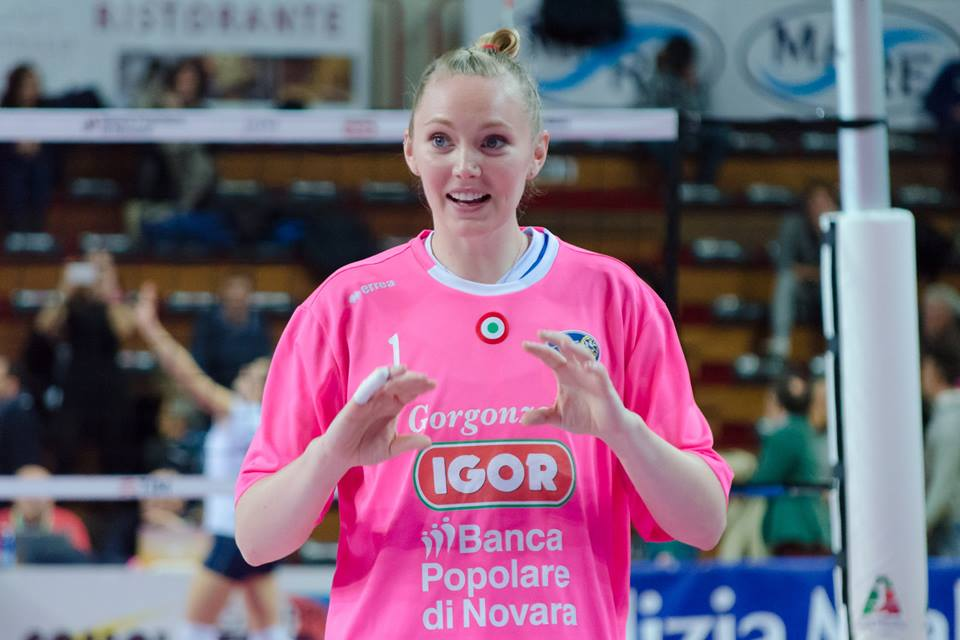
- Fawcett in 2016

Personal information
- Full name: Nicole Marie Fawcett
- Born: December 16, 1986 (age 39); San Antonio, Texas, U.S.
- Height: 1.91 m (6 ft 3 in)
- Spike: 310 cm (120 in)
- Block: 291 cm (115 in)
- Education: Pennsylvania State University

Volleyball information
- Position: Opposite
- Current club: Retired
- Number: 11

Career
| Years | Teams |
|---|---|
| 2009; 2010; 2010–11; 2011; 2011–12; 2012–15; 2015–16; 2015–16; 2016-17; 2016-17; 2017–20 | (Puerto Rico) Gigantes de Carolina (Russia) Dynamo Yantar (Brazil) Usiminas/Minas (Puerto Rico) Llaneras de Toa Baja (China) Guangdong Evergrande (South Korea) Seongnam KEC Hi-pass (China) Fujian Xi Meng Bao (Italy) Igor Gorgonzola Novara (Turkey) Sarıyer Belediyesi (Italy) Imoco Volley (Brazil) Dentil Praia Clube |

National team
| 2009–2016 | United States |
Medal record
Women's volleyball
Representing the United States
World Championship
| Gold medal – first place | 2014 Italy | Team |
World Cup
| Bronze medal – third place | 2015 Japan | Team |
Pan American Games
| Gold medal – first place | 2015 Toronto | Team |
Pan-American Cup
| Bronze medal – third place | 2011 Ciudad Juárez | Team |

Nicole Marie Fawcett (born December 16, 1986) is an American indoor volleyball player who won the 2014 World Championship and 2015 Pan American Games gold medal with the United States national team.

Fawcett played for Penn State University from 2005 to 2008, winning two NCAA national championships in 2007 and 2008.

During her collegiate career, Fawcett was a four-time All-American and racked up many honors, including the AVCA National Player of the Year in 2008, National Freshman of the Year in 2005, and the Honda Sports Award winner for volleyball in 2008. She played professionally for Gigantes de Carolina (The Carolina Giants) in Liga de Voleibol Superior Femenino, Puerto Rico's pro league in 2009.

Fawcett set the most points in a single match world record, scoring 55 points while playing for the Seongnam KEC Hi-pass club in South Korea's V-League on February 14, 2013.

== High school and early life ==
Nicole Fawcett was born in San Antonio, Texas. in 1986. Her mother played volleyball at Wright State and her maternal grandfather was a pitcher for the Baltimore Orioles in 1945.

She grew up in Zanesfield, Ohio, and was a four-year volleyball letterwinner and three year track letterwinner at Benjamin Logan High School near Bellefontaine, Ohio, where she set a school record for kills in a single season for four consecutive years and was the 2004–05 Ohio Gatorade Player of the Year.

She was a two-year member of the USA Junior National Team, including the 2004 squad that won the NORCECA gold medal in Winnipeg, Manitoba, Canada and was a member of the 2003 USA Youth National Team. She played club volleyball for Team Atlantis Volleyball Club and holds the Ohio state record for kills. She also a regional high jump finalist in track in 2004 and 2005.

Fawcett was considered a top three recruit in the class of 2005. She said one of the reasons she chose Penn State was because Rec Hall was her favorite place to be in and that she compared it to every school she visited.

== Penn State ==
Nicole is a 6'3'' (1.91 m) left side hitter and is known for her extremely powerful, hard kills and serves, which makes it very hard for the opposing team to defend.

=== 2005 (Freshman) ===
Fawcett made Penn State history, as she was named the program's first ever AVCA National Freshman of the Year. In addition, she was named the Big Ten Freshman of the Year, a second team All-American, First Team All-Big Ten. She also became Penn State's first ever freshman to earn Big Ten Player of the Week honors.

During the season, she led the Lions and ranked third in the Big Ten with an average of 4.51 kills per seton .309 hitting and also ranked second in the league in conference-only matches with 4.53 kills per set. She led the team in kills on 28 occasions and recorded 31 double-digit kill matches, including a then-career-high 26 kills at Hawaiʻi.

She set an NCAA tournament record for hitting percentage in a single match, which was held since 1983, when she attacked at a career high .889 clip with 16 kills, 0 errors, on 18 attempts against Long Island.

=== 2006 (Sophomore) ===
Fawcett was named a First Team All-American and was also a unanimous first Team All-Big Ten pick as she played in all 35 matches and 113 of 114 sets for the year. She averaged 4.27 kills per set, good for second on the team and eighth in the Big Ten. She finished the season ranked fourth on the team and sixth in the conference in hitting percentage (.331), the only pure left-side hitter in the league within the top six.

Other awards include the Texas Invitational Most Valuable Player after leading Penn State to their dramatic comeback win over the Longhorns. She was also the LSU Classic MVP and the Penn State Invitational MVP.

=== 2007 (Junior) ===
Fawcett reached exactly 1,000 kills in the first match of the season in the 3–1 win over the Texas Longhorns at Rec Hall, earning her Penn State's Golden Volleyball for 1,000 career kills. On August 31 against Cal Poly, she set a new career high for kills in a single match with 31, which was exactly five years to the day that a Penn State player recorded 30 or more kills in a match. Fawcett was one of the best outside hitters in the country, having 533 kills on the year for an average of 4.44 kills per set. The 533 kills ranked ninth on Penn State's single season record list. She led the team in aces and was one of the toughest servers in the country, having 47 aces on the year, more than her first two seasons combined. She was named an AVCA First Team All-American and a unanimous First Team All-Big Ten pick.

She helped her team win their second NCAA Women's Volleyball Championship against top-seeded Stanford on December 15, 2007, at the ARCO Arena. She served championship point just a couple of hours before her 21st birthday. She was named to the Final Four All-Tournament Team as she had 19 kills and two aces in the NCAA championship match. In the National Semifinal win over California, she served the final three points, including two consecutive aces, to win the match in the 3–0 win over the Bears. She was also named the University Park Regional All-Tournament Team in her helping her team to 3–0 wins over Michigan and BYU. Throughout the NCAA tournament, she had at least two service aces in five of the six matches she played in, helping Penn State tie the NCAA record for services aces in an NCAA tournament, set by Long Beach State in 1998.

=== 2008 (Senior) ===
In her final year playing for Penn State, Fawcett was named the American Volleyball Coaches Association National Player of the Year, was the Big Ten Player of the Year, and was voted as the Honda Sports Award winner as the nation's top collegiate volleyball player.

In conference play, Fawcett had 236 kills on a .400 hitting % average. By years end, Fawcett totaled 431 kills. In the 2008 NCAA Tournament, Fawcett had a season high 24 kills against Nebraska in the National Semifinals in Omaha to help Penn State to a 3–2 win, ending Nebraska's 96 match winning streak in the state. In the fifth set vs. Nebraska, Penn State was down 10–8 before Fawcett served six straight points, which included a service ace, to swing the match in favor of Penn State. The next night, Fawcett was named a First Team All-American for the third year in a row and was announced as the Division I National Player of the Year. In the National Championship against Stanford, Fawcett had the championship winning kill and had a total of 10 kills to help the Lions win their second straight national title, and was named to the NCAA Final Four All-Tournament Team for the second year in a row.

Fawcett ended her career with 1,943 total kills, which ranks second in Penn State history.

== Professional ==
In March 2009, Fawcett made her professional debut with Gigantes de Carolina (The Carolina Giants) in Liga de Voleibol Superior Femenino, Puerto Rico's pro league which began its season in January 2009. In her debut she had 16 kills and 2 blocks in a 3–2 loss to undefeated Llaneras de Toa Baja. She got 26 kills and a block in a 3–1 win over Vaqueras de Bayamon.

=== South Korea V-League (2012−2015) ===
In the 2012−13 season, Fawcett moved to South Korea to play for the Seongnam KEC Hi-pass club in South Korea's V-League. Fawcett set the world record for highest individual points scored in a single match on February 14, 2013, when she scored 55 points in leading her club to a five-set victory over Hwaseong IBK Altos. In the match, she recorded 53 kills on 85 attacks with only seven errors as part of her record-breaking performance. Although Seongnam KEC Hi-pass finished a disappointing fourth in the 2012−13 season, Fawcett won the scoring title with 875 points and the All-Star MVP Award.

In the 2013−14 seasons, Fawcett's team failed to reach the Playoffs finishing fourth two years in a row, but she signed a one-year contract extension with the team for the 2014−15 season. Fawcett had another breakout time in the 2014−15 season when she was ranked third in most points with 896 and won the Season MVP Award, leading her team to the regular season championship. In the Finals of the 2014−15 Playoffs, Fawcett led the team in scoring in all three games, racking up 22 points in Game 1, 34 in Game 2 and 21 in Game 3. However, her team failed to win the V-League championship, swept in three games by Hwaseong IBK Altos.

== International competition ==
In June 2009, Fawcett joined the U.S. National Team. As her team won the 2013 Pan-American Cup, she was named the Most Valuable Player and Best Server. Fawcett was part of the USA national team that won the 2014 World Championship, defeating China 3-1 in the final match. As the United States won the 2015 Pan American volleyball championship, defeating Brazil 3-0, she won the competition's Best Opposite individual award. National team coach Karch Kiraly chose to remove her from the team in late June 2016.

== Coaching ==
On February 11, 2020, it was announced that Fawcett was named as Ohio State's women's volleyball team volunteer assistant coach. She helped lead Ohio State to a 16–4 record in her first season as well as a 2020 NCAA Tournament sweet sixteen appearance.

== Awards ==
=== College ===
- Four-time AVCA All-American (2005, 2nd team; 2006, 2007 & 2008, 1st team)
- Four-time First Team All-Big Ten (2005–08)
- Four-time AVCA Mideast Region First Team (2005–08)
- 2009 Finalist for Honda-Broderick Cup
- 2008–09 Penn State Female Athlete of the Year
- 2008 Honda Award winner for volleyball
- 2008 AVCA National Player of the Year
- 2008 Volleyball Magazine National co-Player of the Year
- 2008 Volleyball Magazine First Team All-American
- 2008 NCAA Final Four All-Tournament Team
- 2008 NCAA University Park Regional All-Tournament Team
- 2008 Big Ten Player of the Year
- 2008 Big Ten Player of the Week (9/1, 9/22, 10/6)
- 2008 Hampton Inn Penn State Classic Most Outstanding Player
- 2008 Chicago Classic Championship All-Tournament Team
- 2008 Hawaiian Airlines Classic Most Valuable Player
- 2008 Unanimous Preseason All-Big Ten
- 2007 NCAA Final Four All-Tournament Team
- 2007 NCAA University Park Regional All-Tournament Team
- 2007 Volleyball Magazine First Team All-American
- 2007 Unanimous Preseason All-Big Ten
- 2007 Penn State Classic All-Tournament Team
- 2007 Yale Classic All-Tournament Team
- 2007 Big Ten Player of the Week (10/8)
- 2007 Penn State Golden Volleyball for 1,000 kills
- 2006 Volleyball Magazine First Team All-American
- 2006 NCAA Seattle Regional All-Tournament Team
- 2006 Big Ten Player of the Week (9/4)
- 2006 Texas Invitational Most Valuable Player
- 2006 LSU Classic Most Valuable Player
- 2006 Academic All-Big Ten
- 2006 Unanimous Preseason All-Big Ten
- 2005 AVCA National Freshman of the Year
- 2005 AVCA Mideast Region Freshman of the Year
- 2005 Volleyball Magazine National Freshman of the Year
- 2005 Big Ten Freshman of the Year
- 2005 Big Ten All-Freshman Team
- 2005 Hawaiian Airlines Classic All-Tournament Team
- 2005 Nebraska Players Challenge All-Tournament Team
- 2005 Penn State Classic All-Tournament Team
- 2005 NCAA tournament record for hitting percentage in a single match (.889)
- 2005 Big Ten Player of the Week (9/26, 11/14, 11/28)

=== High school ===
- Four-time First Team CBC (2002–05)
- Four-time First Team District IX (2002–05)
- Three-time District IX Player of the Year (2003–05)
- Three-time First Team All-Ohio (2003–05)
- 2004–05 Ohio Gatorade Player of the Year
- 2005 Volleyball Magazine Fab 50
- 2005 Prepvolleyball.com "Senior Ace" #3
- 2005 Ohio High Magazine Player of the Year
- 2005 Prepvolleyball.com National Senior Player of the Year finalist
- Ohio State kill record holder (1,513)

=== Individuals ===
- 2012−13 South Korea V-League All-Star MVP
- 2012−13 South Korea V-League Scoring Champion
- 2012−13 South Korea V-League Serve Champion
- 2013 Pan-American Cup "Most Valuable Player"
- 2013 Pan-American Cup "Best Server"
- 2014−15 South Korea V-League Most Valuable Player
- 2014−15 South Korea V-League Best Seven
- 2015 Pan American Games "Best Opposite"
- 2015 NORCECA Championship "Most Valuable Player"
- 2018–19 Brazilian Superliga "Best Opposite"

== See also ==
- List of Pennsylvania State University Olympians
