= Darangelys Yantín =

Puerto Rican volleyball player (born 1985)

Personal information
- Full name: Darangelys Yantín Luberza
- Nickname: Gorda
- Nationality: Puerto Rico
- Born: 8 July 1985 (age 41)
- Height: 1.88 m (6 ft 2 in)
- Weight: 60 kg (132 lb)
- Spike: 305 cm (120 in)
- Block: 299 cm (118 in)

National team
2010	Puerto Rico

Darangelys Yantín (born 8 July 1985) is a Puerto Rican volleyball player. She was part of the Puerto Rico national team at the 2010 FIVB World Championship in Japan. She won the 2010 Puerto Rican League season championship with Pinkin de Corozal.

== Career ==
Yantín played for Conquistadoras de Guaynabo and was transferred to Vaqueras de Bayamon for the 2005 Puerto Rican league season, and partnered with Saity Cruz in the beach volleyball national circuit. She played for Pinkin de Corozal starting the 2010 season, helping them to reach the league championship.

Yantín was called to join the Puerto Rico national team, winning the 2010 Unique Cup bronze medal in Peru as a warm up for the 2010 FIVB World Championship in November in Japan, where her national team ranked tied in the 17th place, after winning only one match 3-0 to Kenya, ending with a 1-4 mark.

She repeated with Corozal for the 2011, and the 2012 season, and later played beach volleyball with Bea Rivera. Yantin played beach volleyball with her sister Yamileska, winning the bronze medal in the second leg of the 2013 national circuit. She moved to Orientales de Humacao for the 2013 season She had monetary differences with Orientales and they released her, being signed by Valencianas de Juncos for the 2014 season, and for Gigantes de Carolina for the 2015 season.

== Personal life ==
She is the sister of Jordan, a former volleyball player and coach, volleyball and beach volleyball player Yamileska and his father is a former basketball player, Pedron Yantín. She suffered a car accident where her boyfriend Andrés Ortiz Colón died. The 2016 Puerto Rican league season and the All-Star game were dedicated to her, in order to help her cover the expenses of the three years of therapy she needed and the surgery to repair her Brachial plexus injury.

== Clubs ==
- (Puerto Rico) Conquistadoras de Guaynabo (2004)
- (Puerto Rico) Vaqueras de Bayamón (2005-2009)
- (Puerto Rico) Pinkin de Corozal (2010-2012)
- (Puerto Rico) Orientales de Humacao (2013)
- (Puerto Rico) Valencianas de Juncos (2014)
- (Puerto Rico) Gigantes de Carolina (2015)

== Awards ==
=== Clubs ===
- 2010 Puerto Rican League – Champion, with Pinkin de Corozal
