= Jenny Kropp =

American beach volleyball player

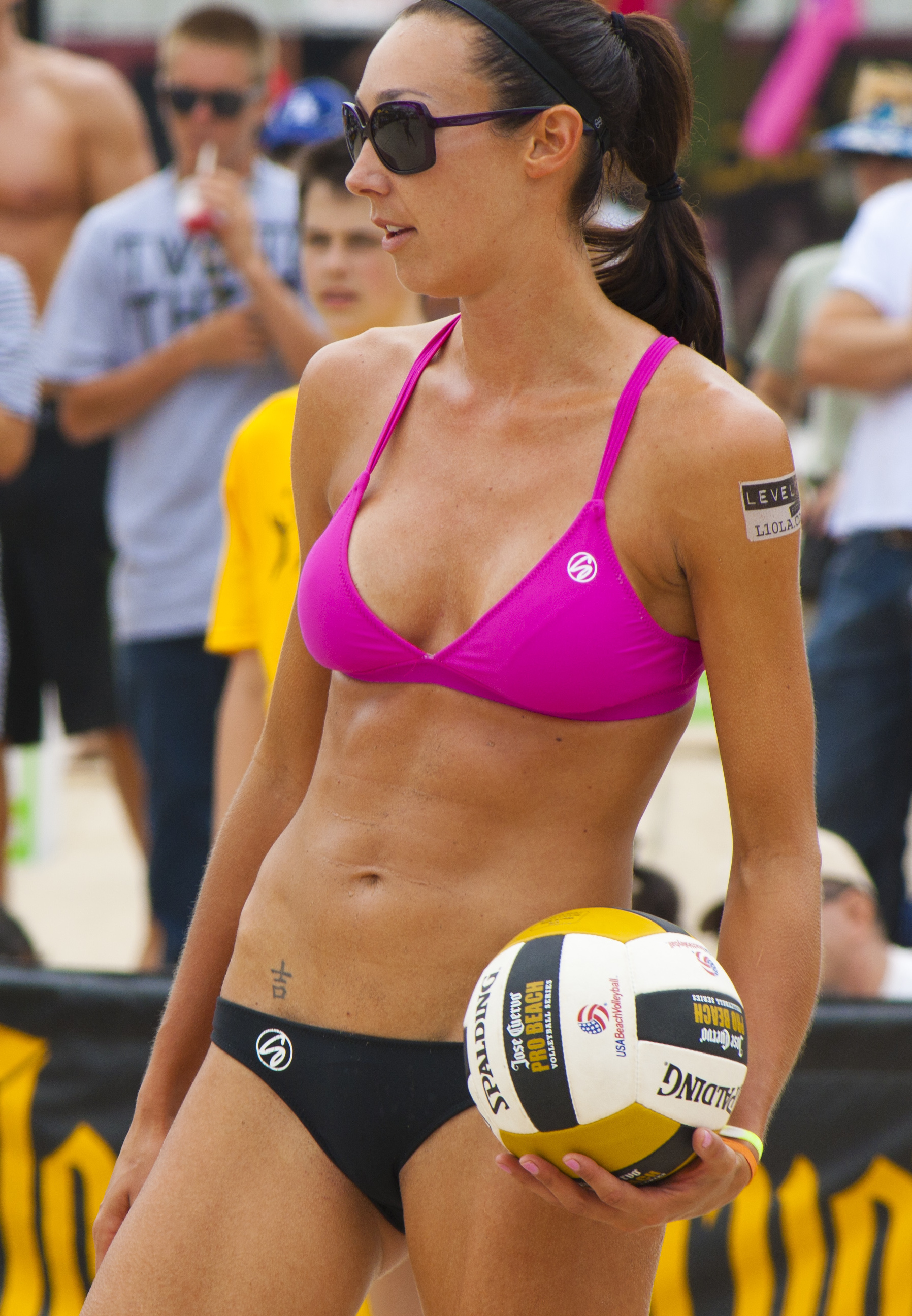
- Kropp in 2012

Personal information
- Full name: Jenny Ann Kropp
- Nickname: Jenny
- Nationality: United States
- Born: June 17, 1979 (age 47); Grand Island, Nebraska, U.S.
- Hometown: Grand Island, Nebraska, U.S.
- Height: 189 cm (6 ft 2 in)

Beach volleyball information
Years	Teammate
2007-2015	Whitney Pavlik

Jenny Ann Kropp (born June 17, 1979) is an American beach volleyball player.

Born in Grand Island, Nebraska, Kropp graduated from Grand Island Central Catholic High School in 1998. She studied at University of Nebraska–Lincoln where she played at middle blocker for the Nebraska Cornhuskers. Kropp was a first-team All-Big 12 honoree in 2000 and 2001 and All America Second Team in 2001.

After graduating from college, she played professionally in Puerto Rico, with Vaqueras de Bayamón from Liga de Voleibol Superior Femenino two years.

She was named Sexiest Swimsuit Bikini Model Athlete on the 2009 AVP Tour, by the SoCal Beaches Magazine.

== Clubs ==
- (Puerto Rico) Vaqueras de Bayamón 2003

== Awards ==
=== Individual ===
- 2001 AVCA All-America Second Team
- 2000 and 2001 AVCA All-Region
- 2007 AVP Crocs Tour Rookie of the Year

=== NCAA ===
- 2000 NCAA National Championship – with Nebraska

=== AVP Pro Tour ===
- AVP Pro Tour Atlanta 2008
- AVP Pro Tour Chicago 2007
- AVP Pro Tour 2015 Gold Medal
- Jose Cuervo Tour 2010 & 2011 Manhattan Beach Open Gold Medal
