= Laura Daniela Lloreda =

Puerto Rican-Mexican volleyball player

Laura Lloreda

Personal information
- Full name: Laura Daniela Lloreda
- Nationality: Puerto Rican / Mexican
- Born: April 30, 1981 (age 45); Hato Rey, Puerto Rico
- Hometown: Veracruz, Mexico
- Height: 1.73 m (5 ft 8 in)
- Weight: 80 kg (180 lb)

Volleyball information
- Position: Wing Spiker/Setter

National team
2001 - 2004, 2011	Mexico
- Last updated: September 2011

Laura Daniela Lloreda (born April 30, 1981, in Hato Rey, San Juan, Puerto Rico) holds dual U.S.-Mexican citizenship as a Puerto Rican-born naturalized Mexican citizen and volleyball player in Mexico. She has lived for many years in the state of Veracruz, Mexico, and was in the Mexico national team at various international competitions.

== Biography ==
The daughter of Waldo and Adela Lloreda, Laura Daniela Lloreda spent her childhood in Puerto Rico, but she chose to move to Mexico at age 15, having been offered an opportunity to study at the Universidad de las Americas. Lloreda later played for the Veracruz team in the Mexico national women's volleyball league, and she earned a spot, after a few months in Mexico, to play for that national team.

In 1996, she led the Mexico national team to a bronze medal at the NORCECA competition, held in the Dominican Republic. In 1997, on home soil, she led the team to a silver medal. In 1998, when the tournament returned to the Dominican Republic, her team also took a silver medal. In 1999, the team finished in sixth place; she was named the tournament's MVP.

In 2001, she went on to Baylor University in the United States, where she excelled right away, leading her team in various categories. She was chosen 2001 Big 12 Conference Newcomer of the Year. On October 22 of that year, she tied a school record, and broke a Big 12 Conference record, by recording nine ace services. In 2005, she played with her national team at the 2005 Pan-American Cup, finishing with her team in 7th place; that year also participated at the 2005 Summer Universiade.

She played for Llaneras de Toa Baja from the Puerto Rican professional volleyball league for the 2007 season.

== Clubs ==
- (Mexico) Veracruz
- (Puerto Rico) Llaneras de Toa Baja (2007)

== See also ==
- List of Puerto Ricans
- History of women in Puerto Rico
