= Nellie Spicer =

American volleyball player (born 1987)

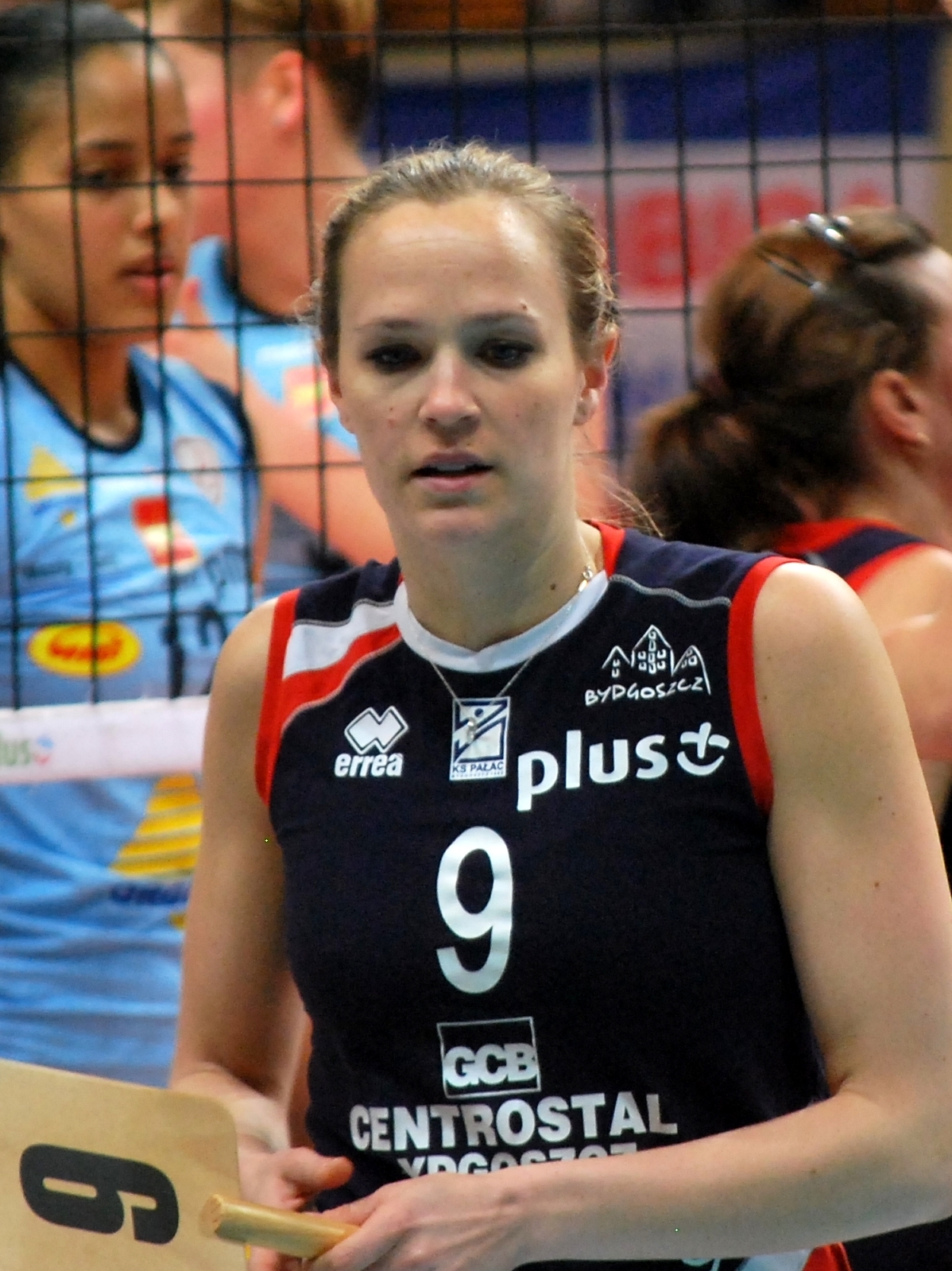

Personal information
- Full name: Mary Nelson Spicer
- Nationality: American
- Born: July 3, 1987 (age 39); Barrington, Illinois, U.S.
- Height: 5 ft 9 in (1.75 m)
- Weight: 143 lb (65 kg)
- Spike: 115 in (292 cm)
- Block: 110 in (280 cm)

Volleyball information
- Position: Setter/spiker
- Number: 17

Career
| Years | Teams |
|---|---|
| 2005–2008; 2010; 2010–2011; 2011–2012; 2012–2013; 2013–2014 | (United States) UCLA (Puerto Rico) Leonas de Ponce (Poland) Bydgoszcz (Azerbaijan) Rabita Baku (Azerbaijan) Lokomotiv Baku (China) Shanghai Volleyball |

National team
| 2008–2013 | United States |
Medal record
Women's volleyball
Representing the United States
FIVB World Grand Prix
| Gold medal – first place | 2010 Ningbo | Team |

Mary Nelson "Nellie" Spicer (born July 3, 1987) is an American indoor volleyball player. She is a 5 ft 9 in (1.75 m) setter. Spicer is a member of the United States women's national volleyball team. She played college women's volleyball at UCLA.
