= Sonja Newcombe =

American volleyball player

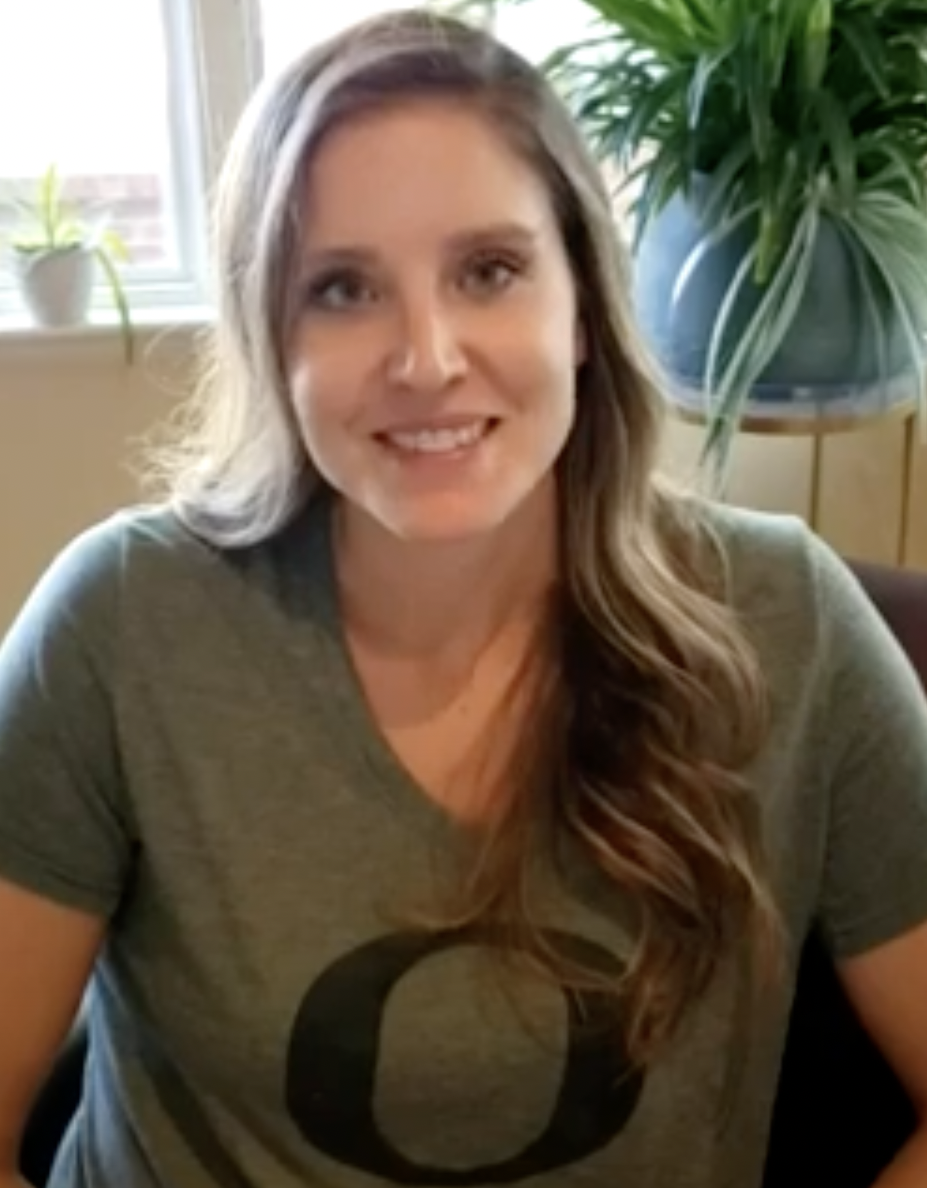

Personal information
- Nationality: American
- Born: March 7, 1988 (age 38)
- Home town: Lake Arrowhead, California
- Education: University of Oregon
- Height: 6 ft 0 in (1.84 m)
- Weight: 154 lb (70 kg)
- Spike: 120 in (305 cm)
- Block: 120 in (300 cm)

Volleyball information
- Position: Wing-spiker
- Current club: Liaoning women's volleyball team

National team
- Years: Team
- –: United States

Sonja Newcombe (born March 7, 1988) is an American indoor volleyball player, a member of the United States women's national volleyball team. She currently plays for Liaoning women's volleyball team in China.

She participated in the 2013 FIVB World Grand Prix, 2014 Montreux Volley Masters, and 2017 Women's Pan-American Volleyball Cup.

== Clubs ==
Years	Club
2006–2009	University of Oregon
2010	Leonas de Ponce
2010–2011	UGSÉ Nantes
2011–2012	Pursaklar
2012	Criollas de Caguas
2012–2013	Vilsbiburg
2013–2014	Tjumen
2014–2015	İdman Ocağı
2015–2016	Guangdong Hengda
2016	Lokomotiv Baku
2016–2017	Sichuan
2017	SAB
2017–2018	Minas
2018	CSM Volei Alba Blaj
2019	Liaoning women's volleyball team
2020	Eczacibasi VitrA
