= Bianca Rivera =

Puerto Rican volleyball player (born 1987)

Personal information
- Nationality: Puerto Rico
- Born: 4 October 1987 (age 39)
- Height: 1.78 m (5 ft 10 in)
- Weight: 89 kg (196 lb)
- Spike: 280 cm (110 in)
- Block: 276 cm (109 in)

Career
| Years | Teams |
|---|---|
| 2013 | Bayamon |

National team
| 2013 | Puerto Rico |

Bianca Rivera (born 4 October 1987) in San Juan, Puerto Rico is a Puerto Rican female volleyball player. She was part of the Puerto Rico women's national volleyball team.

She participated in the 2013 FIVB Volleyball World Grand Prix. On club level she played for Bayamon in 2013.
