= Alexis Crimes =

American volleyball player (born 1986)

Personal information
- Nationality: American
- Born: June 12, 1986 (age 40)
- Height: 6 ft 3 in (191 cm)
- Weight: 150 lb (68 kg)
- Spike: 128 in (325 cm)
- Block: 118 in (300 cm)

Volleyball information
- Number: 9 (national team)

Career
Years	Teams
2009-2009	Sarıyer Bld.

National team
2009-2016	United States

Alexis Crimes (born June 12, 1986) is an American female volleyball player. She was part of the United States women's national volleyball team.

She participated in the 2009 FIVB Volleyball World Grand Prix. On the club level she played for BKS Stal Bielsko-Biala in 2009.

== Clubs ==
- (Turkey) Sarıyer Bld. (2016-)
