= Lancheras de Cataño =

Volleyball team of Cataño, Puerto Rico

Lancheras de Cataño Voleibol Club
- Full name: Lancheras de Cataño Voleibol Club
- Short name: Lancheras de Cataño
- Founded: 2010 (in Cataño); 2008 (in San Sebastián)
- Ground: Cancha Cosme Beitía Sálamo; Cataño, Puerto Rico (Capacity: 2500)
- Chairman: (Puerto Rico) William López
- Manager: (Puerto Rico) Rafael Olazagasti
- Captain: (Puerto Rico) Shannon Torregrosa-Wingate
- League: LVSF
- 2012: League Championship

Lancheras de Cataño Voleibol Club is the professional female volleyball team of Cataño, Puerto Rico.

== History ==
The team was founded in 2008 and played as Caribes de San Sebastián in the 2009 season, then moved to Cataño and was renamed Lancheras de Cataño.

In the 2012 season, the team won the League Championship with the American setter Courtney Thompson being awarded as the final series' most valuable player. The team qualified for the 2012 FIVB Club World Championship held in Doha, Qatar, and finished fourth out of six teams.

== Squads ==
=== Current ===
As of October 2012

- Head Coach: (Puerto Rico) Rafael Olazagasti
- Assistant coach: (Puerto Rico) Esai Velez

Number	Player	Position
1	(Puerto Rico) Tatiana Jusino	Wing Spiker/ Libero
2	(Puerto Rico) Deborah Seilhamer	Libero
3	(Puerto Rico) Yarimar Rosa	Wing Spiker
4	(Puerto Rico) Tatiana Encarnación	Wing Spiker
5	(Puerto Rico) Myrlena López	Middle Blocker
6	(Puerto Rico) Paulette García	Wing Spiker
7	(Puerto Rico) Mariel Medina	Setter
8	(Puerto Rico) Jetzabel Del Valle	Middle Blocker
9	(Venezuela) Oneida González	Opposite
10	(Puerto Rico) Natalía Valentin	Setter
11	(United States) Jessica Jones	Middle Blocker
18	(Puerto Rico) Shannon Torregrosa-Wingate	Middle Blocker/ Opposite
