= Coliseo Rubén Rodríguez =

Multi-purpose arena in Bayamón, Puerto Rico

- El Rancho (The Ranch)
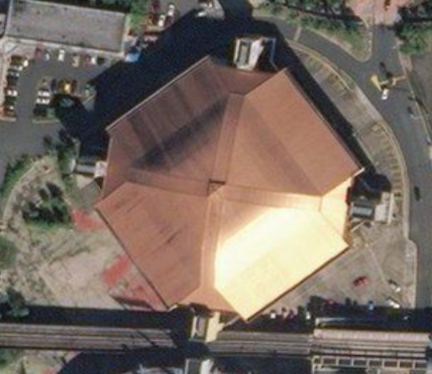
- Satellite image of Coliseo Rubén Rodríguez
- Interactive map of Coliseo Rubén Rodríguez
- Full name: Coliseo Rubén Rodríguez
- Location: Pájaros, Bayamón, Puerto Rico
- Coordinates: 18°23′41.85″N 66°9′3″W
- Capacity: 3,000 (minimum); 12,000 (maximum)
- Field size: 310 feet by 310 feet

Construction
- Built: 1988

Tenants
- Vaqueros de Bayamón (BSN) (1988–present); Vaqueras de Bayamón (LVSF) (1988–present); Puerto Rico Tip-Off (NCAA)

Coliseo Rubén Rodriguez is a prominent indoor sporting arena located in Bayamón, Puerto Rico. Named in honor of Rubén Rodríguez, a legendary former player for the Vaqueros de Bayamón, the coliseum was inaugurated in 1988 and remains one of the largest venues in the San Juan metropolitan area. It has a seating capacity of approximately 12,000 spectators and is accessible via the Tren Urbano commuter system, with the Deportivo station serving as the nearest stop. The arena is best known as the home court of the Vaqueros de Bayamón, one of the most successful franchises in Puerto Rican basketball history. Since its opening, the arena has hosted a wide variety of events, including UFC 8, an internationally televised mixed martial arts event, as well as basketball, volleyball, boxing, concerts, and other large-scale entertainment shows. It continues to serve as a central hub for sports and cultural events in Puerto Rico.

== Notable Events and Usage ==
Since its inauguration, Coliseo Rubén Rodríguez has served as a versatile venue for a wide array of sporting and entertainment events. It has hosted professional basketball games as the home court of the Vaqueros de Bayamón, as well as competitions in boxing, volleyball, kickboxing, and professional wrestling. The arena has also been a regular site for family and children's programming, including performances such as Sesame Street Live (2003–2007, 2011), Disney on Ice (2007), Atención Atención (2009), Dora the Explorer Live (2013), Doki Live (2014), and El Pequeño Gran Club (2016). More recently, it hosted Arcadia Battle Royale 2024, a large-scale entertainment event.

In addition to sports and family entertainment, the coliseum was one of the venues for the Miss Universe 2001 pageant, further highlighting its role as a major cultural site in Puerto Rico.

In 2021, the facility received a $1.1 million public investment earmarked for infrastructure improvements and renovations.

Events and tenants
Preceded by Mammoth Gardens	Ultimate Fighting Championship venue UFC 8	Succeeded by Cobo Arena
Preceded by Eleftheria Indoor Hall (Cyprus) Nicosia	Miss Universe venue 2001	Succeeded by Roberto Clemente Coliseum (Puerto Rico) San Juan
