= Kristee Porter =

American volleyball player and coach

Personal information
- Born: May 7, 1980 (age 46)
- Hometown: Colorado Springs, Colorado, U.S.
- Height: 6 ft 0 in (183 cm)
- Spike: 119 in (303 cm)
- Block: 118 in (299 cm)

Volleyball information
- Position: Varsity Volleyball Head Coach, Saginaw High School

National team
United States

Kristee Porter (born May 7, 1980) is an American volleyball player and coach.

She participated at the 2002 FIVB World Grand Prix.

Porter is the head coach of the North Texas Mean Green volleyball team, which is a member of the American Athletic Conference. She was hired to lead the program on December 26, 2021.

Porter played for University of California, Los Angeles. She coached for University of Colorado, Navarro College, and Robert E. Lee High School.

On November 1, 2019, Porter was inducted into the UCLA Athletics Hall of Fame as a three-sport participant. She was on the women's volleyball, basketball, track & field teams.
