= Llaneras de Toa Baja =

Volleyball team of Toa Baja, Puerto Rico

- Full name: Llaneras de Toa Baja
- Founded: 1994
- Ground: Coliseo Antonio R. Barceló; Toa Baja, Puerto Rico
- Chairman: (Puerto Rico) Martín Rosado
- Head Coach: (Puerto Rico) Juan Carlos Núñez
- League: LVSF
- 2009: 1st

Llaneras de Toa Baja is the professional female volleyball team of Toa Baja, Puerto Rico.

== Squads ==
=== Current ===
As of April 2011

- Head Coach: (Puerto Rico) Juan Carlos Núñez
- Assistant coach: (Puerto Rico) Gabriel Rodríguez

Number	Player	Position
1	(Puerto Rico) Daly Santana	Wing Spiker
2	(Puerto Rico) Shara Venegas	Libero
3	(Puerto Rico) Yeimily Mojica	Setter
4	(Puerto Rico) Yari Erazo	Wing Spiker
5	(Puerto Rico) Elimarie Escalante	Setter
6	(Puerto Rico) Normarie Esclusa	Setter
7	(Cuba) Yasary Castrodad	Middle Blocker
10	(United States) Nicole Fawcett	Wing Spiker
11	(United States) Morgan Beck	Opposite
12	(Puerto Rico) Charlene Dominguez	Libero
15	(United States) Brittnee Cooper	Middle Blocker
16	(United States) Katie Dull	Wing Spiker
17	(Puerto Rico) Lynda Morales	Middle Blocker
18	(Puerto Rico) Liza Venegas	Libero

==== Release or Transfer ====
Number	Player	Position
9	(United States) Lexi Zimmerman	Setter
10	(Venezuela) Graciela Márquez	Wing Spiker
11	(United States) Whitney Dosty	Opposite
14	(Puerto Rico) Zulma Correa	Wing Spiker

== Palmares ==
=== League Championship ===
1999, 2009
