= Leonas de Ponce =

Female volleyball team in Ponce, Puerto Rico

Ponce Leonas
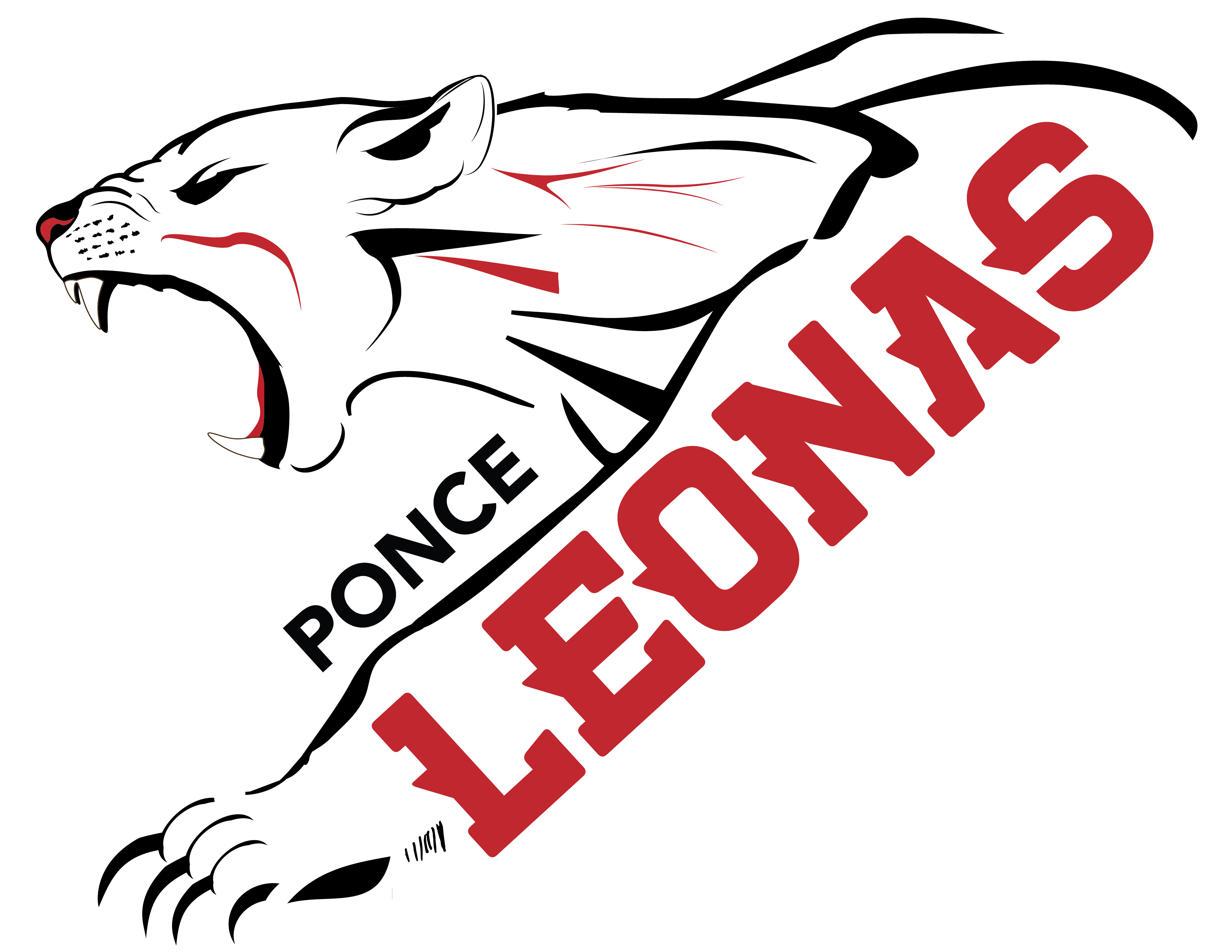
- Full name: Ponce Leonas Voleibol Superior Femenino
- Founded: 1985
- Ground: Coliseo Salvador Dijols; Ponce, Puerto Rico (Capacity: 2,000)
- Chairman: (Puerto Rico) Ing. Marcos M. Martínez
- Head Coach: (Puerto Rico) Ramón "Monchito" Hernández
- League: LVSF

Previously named Leonas de Ponce, Ponce Leonas is the professional female volleyball team of Ponce, Puerto Rico. Their home stadium is Cancha Salvador Dijols in Playa de Ponce, Ponce, Puerto Rico.

== History ==
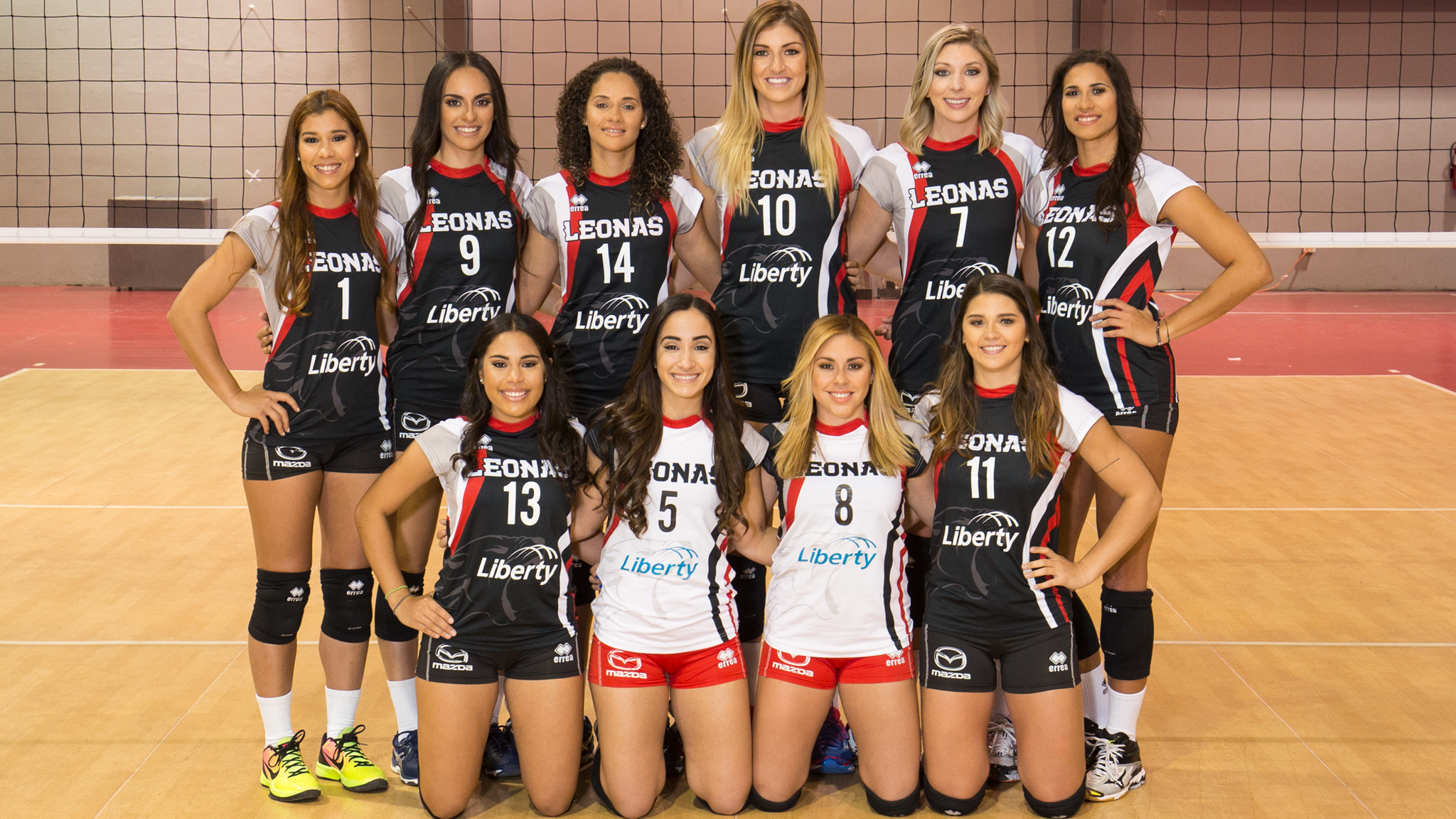
The volleyball team in 2017

The team was founded in 1985.

== Squads ==
=== Current ===
As of February 2017

- Head coach: (Puerto Rico) Ramon Hernandez

Number	Player	Position
1	(Puerto Rico) Natalia Valentín	Setter
2	(Puerto Rico) Gabriela Colón	Outside hitter
3	(Cuba) Dulce María Téllez	Central
5	(Puerto Rico) Valeria León	Libero
7	(United States) Gina Mancuso	Outside hitter
8	(Puerto Rico) Nayka Benítez	Liberto
9	(Puerto Rico) Nelmarie Cruz	Outside hitter
10	(United States) Taylor Simpson	Opposite
11	(United States) Deme Morales	Outside hitter
12	(Puerto Rico) Janeliss Torres	Central
13	(Puerto Rico) Yeleishka Vázquez	Setter
14	(Puerto Rico) Yozually Ortiz	Opposite
18	(Puerto Rico) Hecters Rivera	Central

== Palmares ==
=== League Championship ===
1989,1990,1991
