= Vaqueras de Bayamón =

Volleyball team of Bayamón, Puerto Rico

- Full name: Vaqueras de Bayamón
- Short name: Vaqueras
- Founded: 2001
- Ground: Coliseo Rubén Rodríguez; Bayamón, Puerto Rico (Capacity: 13,000)
- Chairman: (Puerto Rico) Herminio Nieves
- Manager: (Puerto Rico) Yarelis Rodríguez
- Captain: (United States) Erin Moore
- League: LVSF
- 2006: 4th

Uniforms
Home	Away

Vaqueras de Bayamón is the professional female volleyball team of Bayamón, Puerto Rico.

== Squads ==
=== Current ===
As of April 2011

- Head Coach: (Puerto Rico) Luis Aponte
- Assistant coach: (Puerto Rico) Gerardo Batista

Number	Player	Position
1	(Puerto Rico) Yeimily Mojica	Setter
2	(Puerto Rico) Jennylee Martinez	Middle Blocker
5	(Puerto Rico) Zuleika Negron	Wing Spiker
6	(Puerto Rico) Maria Fernanda Escoto	Libero
7	(Puerto Rico)	Setter
8	(Puerto Rico) Yozually Ortiz	Opposite
9	(United States) Kelly Murphy	Opposite
13	(United States) Hannah Werth	Wing Spiker
14	(Puerto Rico) Jennifer Quesada	Middle Blocker
17	(United States) Ania Ruiz	Wing Spiker
18	(Puerto Rico) Enimarie Fernandez	Middle Blocker

=== Release or Transfer ===
Number	Player	Position
4	(United States) Amy DeGroot	Wing Spiker
18	(Puerto Rico) Jennifer Quesada	Middle Blocker
