= Gigantes de Carolina (women's volleyball) =

Volleyball team in Carolina, Puerto Rico

- Full name: Gigantes de Carolina
- Short name: Gigantes
- Founded: 2002
- Ground: Guillermo Angulo Coliseum; Carolina, Puerto Rico (Capacity: 10000)
- Chairman: (Puerto Rico) Aimee Negrón
- Manager: (Puerto Rico) Arcangel Ruíz
- Captain: (Puerto Rico) Tatiana Encarnación
- League: LVSF
- 2016: 6th

Uniforms
Home	Away

Gigantes de Carolina is the professional female volleyball team of Carolina, Puerto Rico.

== History ==
The team was found in 2002.

== Squads ==
=== Current ===
As of April 2011

- Head Coach: (Puerto Rico) Javier Gaspar
- Assistant coach: (Puerto Rico) Angel Peña

Number	Player	Position
1	(Puerto Rico) Daniela Bertrán	Wing Spiker
2	(Puerto Rico) Paulette García	Wing Spiker
4	(Puerto Rico) Tatiana Encarnación	Wing Spiker
5	(Puerto Rico) Xaimara Colón	Libero
6	(Puerto Rico) Laudevis Marrero	Middle Blocker
7	(Puerto Rico) Madeline Gonzalez	Setter
8	(Puerto Rico) Carolina García	Wing Spiker/Opposite
9	(United States) Jennifer Doris	Middle Blocker
10	(Puerto Rico) Cristina Correa	Middle Blocker
11	(Puerto Rico) Stephanie Perez	Setter
12	(United States) Whitney Dosty	Wing Spiker
13	(Puerto Rico) Grace Salado	Middle Blocker/Opposite
18	(United States) Sherisa Livingston	Opposite

=== Release or Transfer ===
Number	Player	Position
	(United States) Jane Collymore	Wing Spiker
11	(Puerto Rico) Siamar Santiago	Setter

== Palmares ==
=== League Championship ===
- 2003, 2004 and 2006
